= R. S. Manohar filmography =

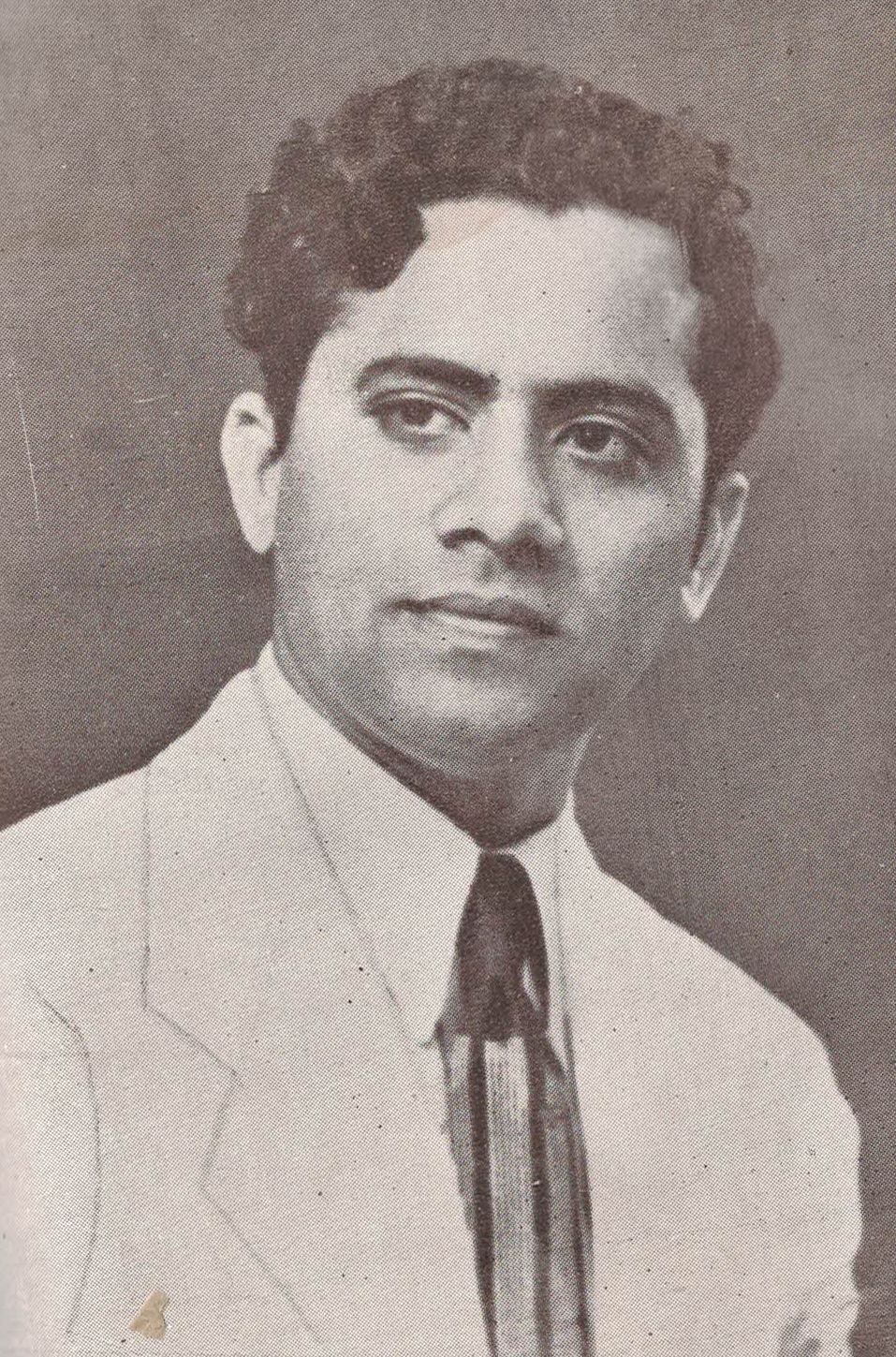
R. S. Manohar in TP Talks

This is the filmography of Indian actor R. S. Manohar, who performed roles ranging from hero to villain to comedic character. He acted in over 300 Tamil films. He was popular for negative roles. He also played supporting roles in films with actors M. G. Ramachandran, Sivaji Ganesan, Gemini Ganesan, S. S. Rajendran, Jaishankar, Ravichandran, Sivakumar, Rajinikanth and Kamal Haasan. He is known for his versatility and dominating personality.

According to film historian Randor Guy, he got a breakthrough in film with Rajambal (1951), well known crime novel of J. R. Rangaraju and produced by Modern Theatres, it was his debut film, Madhuri Devi was heroine and he was paid 25,000 remuneration. The film fared well at the box office. His early memorable roles were in films such as Viduthalai (1954), where he played victimised brother of a vicious lawyer - judge. A top class K. Ramnoth movie. The film based on play The First and the Last. Vannakili (1959), where he played drunkard thug named as Poochie, he forcefully marries village girl Saraswarthi and gives her a hard time. Vannakili proved a great success. In Kaithi Kannayiram (1960), he played an innocent banker who loses his son and is jailed on false charges. He finds a new direction in life and decides to save the life of the Jailor's son who is kidnapped by other inmates of the jail. The film was a commercial hit at the box office. Konjum Salangai(1962), where he played a dictatorial commander who wants to usurp the throne. In Vallavanukku Vallavan (1965), he played an honest police inspector who goes undercover as thug named Pichuva Pakkiri. The film ran for over 100 days in theatres. Vallavan Oruvan(1966), where he played Dr. Sargunam, a Tamil hypnotist and psychologist with the help of his finance. A doctor who promotes drug abuse, murder and anti-social activities. He is a cape wearing supervillain and mad scientist in Iru Vallavargal (1966).

Manohar was T. R. Sundaram favorite, starring in 18 film of his films. The highest by any actor working for Modern Theatres such as Rajambal, Petra Maganai Vitra Annai, Vannakili, Thalai Koduthaan Thambi, Kaithi Kannayiram, Konjum Kumari, Kattu Roja, Chitrangi, Vallavanukku Vallavan, Vallavan Oruvan, Iru Vallavargal, Ethirigal Jakkirathai, Kadhalithal Podhuma, Naangu Killadigal, CID Shankar, Justice Viswanathan, Karundhel Kannayiram, Thedi Vandha Lakshmi.

== Filmography ==
=== 1950s ===
| Year | Title | Role | Note(s) | Ref. |
|---|---|---|---|---|
| 1951 | Rajambal | Gopalan | | |
| 1952 | Thai Ullam | Manohar | | |
| 1953 | Mamiyar | | | |
| 1953 | Gumastha | Gopu | | |
| 1953 | Lakshmi | | | |
| 1954 | Ponvayal | Bangaru | | |
| 1954 | Viduthalai | | | |
| 1954 | Vaira Malai | | | |
| 1954 | Nanban | | | |
| 1955 | Nalla Thangal | | | |
| 1955 | Nallavan | | | |
| 1955 | Nam Kuzhandai | | | |
| 1956 | Moondru Pengal | | | |
| 1956 | Nalla Veedu | | | |
| 1956 | Ondre Kulam | | | |
| 1958 | Petra Maganai Vitra Annai | Minister Gunasekaran | | |
| 1959 | Vannakili | Poochi | | |
| 1959 | Athisaya Penn | Raju | | |
| 1959 | Madhavi | | | |
| 1959 | Panchaali | | | |
| 1959 | Pudhmai Penn | | | |
| 1959 | Thayapola Pillai Noolapola Selai | | | |
| 1959 | Thalai Koduthaan Thambi | Vijayan | | |
| 1959 | Sollu Thambi Sollu | | | |

=== 1960s ===
| Year | Title | Role | Note(s) | Ref. |
|---|---|---|---|---|
| 1960 | Thozhan | | | |
| 1960 | Kaithi Kannayiram | Kannayiram | | |
| 1961 | Thayilla Pillai | Doctor Bharathi | | |
| 1962 | Dakshayagnam | | | |
| 1962 | Konjum Salangai | General Naga Devan | | |
| 1962 | Neeya Naana | | | |
| 1963 | Konjum Kumari | Rajangam | | |
| 1963 | Vanambadi | Gopal | | |
| 1963 | Kattu Roja | Somu | | |
| 1963 | Kulamagal Radhai | Natarajan | | |
| 1963 | Yarukku Sontham | | | |
| 1964 | Amma Enge | | | |
| 1964 | Arunagirinathar | Tamil Pandit | | |
| 1964 | Chitrangi | Commander | | |
| 1964 | Panakkara Kudumbam | Kannaiya | | |
| 1965 | Vallavanukku Vallavan | Bijuva Pakkiri/Inspector Sekhar | | |
| 1965 | Aayirathil Oruvan | Dictator of Nedhal Naadu | | |
| 1965 | Kaattu Rani | | | |
| 1965 | Kalyana Mandapam | | | |
| 1965 | Panam Padaithavan | Joker | | |
| 1965 | Nee (film) | Smuggling Head | | |
| 1965 | Vaazhkai Padagu | Kannabiran Henchman | | |
| 1966 | Iru Vallavargal | | | |
| 1966 | Kumari Penn | | | |
| 1966 | Naan Aanaiyittal | Kumar | | |
| 1966 | Mahakavi Kalidas | | | |
| 1966 | Parakkum Paavai | Kabali | | |
| 1966 | Thattungal Thirakkappadum | Shankar | | |
| 1966 | Vallavan Oruvan | Doctor Sanrgunam | | |
| 1967 | Arasa Kattalai | The Minister | | |
| 1967 | Ethirigal Jakkirathai | Inspector Raju/No.31 | | |
| 1967 | Kaavalkaaran | Kombhay | | |
| 1967 | Kadhalithal Podhuma | Thangaraj | | |
| 1967 | Naan | | | |
| 1967 | Pattanathil Bhootham | | | |
| 1967 | Thaikku Thalaimagan | Ranga | | |
| 1967 | Uyir Mel Aasai | | | |
| 1968 | Kadhal Vaaganam | Kala's Husband | | |
| 1968 | Kanavan | Manohar | | |
| 1968 | Kuzhanthaikkaga | Joseph | | |
| 1968 | Oli Vilakku | Maari | | |
| 1968 | Moondrezhuthu | | | |
| 1969 | Adimaippenn | Royal body guard Magudapathy | | |
| 1969 | Kanni Penn | Sarangan | | |
| 1969 | Mannippu | Public Prosecutor | | |
| 1969 | Manasatchi | | | |
| 1969 | Naangu Killadigal | Ganesan Iyer | | |
| 1969 | Nam Naadu | Vijay | | |
| 1969 | Kuzhandai Ullam | | | |

=== 1970s ===
| Year | Title | Role | Note(s) | Ref. |
|---|---|---|---|---|
| 1970 | CID Shankar | Boopathy | | |
| 1970 | Engal Thangam | Marathandan | | |
| 1970 | Koi Kulam Nahin | | | |
| 1971 | Justice Viswanathan | Kabhali | | |
| 1971 | Meendum Vazhven | Jagadeesh | | |
| 1971 | Kumari Kottam | Rathinam | | |
| 1971 | Oru Thaai Makkal | | | |
| 1971 | Neerum Neruppum | Maruthu | | |
| 1971 | Nootrukku Nooru | | | |
| 1971 | Rickshawkaran | 'Kathikuthu' Karmegham | | |
| 1971 | Sorgam | Dharmalingam/Arun (Twin Brothers) | | |
| 1971 | Therottam | | | |
| 1972 | Agathiyar | Ilangeswaran/Ravanan | | |
| 1972 | Annamitta Kai | Kannaga Rathinam | | |
| 1972 | Deivam | Thief | | |
| 1972 | Karunthel Kannayiram | | | |
| 1972 | Needhi | Nagalingam | | |
| 1972 | Pillaiyo Pillai | Gangatharan | | |
| 1972 | Raja | Viswam | | |
| 1972 | Thiruneelakandar | Lord Shiva | | |
| 1972 | Varaverpu | | | |
| 1973 | Rajaraja Cholan | Sathiyasiriyan | | |
| 1973 | Thedi Vandha Lakshmi | Jamboo | | |
| 1973 | Ulagam Sutrum Valiban | Lilly's Brother | | |
| 1973 | Vaayaadi | | | |
| 1974 | En Magan | Baskar | | |
| 1974 | Prayaschitham | | | |
| 1974 | Sirithu Vazha Vendum | Othai Kannu | | |
| 1974 | Sisubalan | Sisubalan | | |
| 1974 | Sivakamiyin Selvan | | | |
| 1974 | Vairam | Senthil Nathan | | |
| 1974 | Thanga Pathakkam | Maynor | | |
| 1975 | Idhayakkani | Albert | | |
| 1975 | Paattum Bharathamum | Shanmugasundaram | | |
| 1975 | Pallandu Vazhga | Sangili | | |
| 1975 | Yarukkum Vetkam Illai | | | |
| 1976 | Chitra Pournami | Zamindar | | |
| 1976 | Rojavin Raja | Singapore Rasappa | | |
| 1976 | Ungalil Oruthi | | | |
| 1977 | Sri Krishna Leela | King Kamsan | | |
| 1978 | Ennai Pol Oruvan | Sabapathy | | |
| 1978 | Mela Thalangal | Jambu | | |
| 1979 | Allauddinum Albhutha Vilakkum | Magician | | |
| 1979 | Gnana Kuzhandhai | Mahendrapuri King | | |
| 1979 | Pattakkathi Bhairavan | Dharmalingam | | |
| 1979 | Nejukku Needhi | | | |

=== 1980s ===
| Year | Title | Role | Note(s) | Ref. |
|---|---|---|---|---|
| 1980 | Billa | Ranjith | | |
| 1981 | Thee | Madanagopal | | |
| 1981 | Sankarlal | | | |
| 1982 | Sangili | | | |
| 1983 | Thai Veedu | | | |
| 1983 | Thanga Magan | Kaali | | |
| 1985 | Navagraha Nayagi | Raghu | | |
| 1985 | Raja Rishi | Dhuruvasar | | |
| 1987 | Manaivi Ready | | | |
| 1989 | Enga Ooru Mappillai | | | |
| 1989 | Meenakshi Thiruvilayadal | | | |

=== 1990s ===
| Year | Title | Role | Note(s) | Ref. |
|---|---|---|---|---|
| 1992 | Naane Varuven | Saint | | |
| 1992 | Pagadai Panirendu | | | |
