= List of Tamil films of 1964 =

Post-amendment to the Tamil Nadu Entertainments Tax Act 1939 on 1 April 1958, Gross jumped to 140 per cent of Nett Commercial Taxes Department disclosed ₹4.41 crore in entertainment tax revenue for the year.

The following is a list of films produced in the Tamil film industry in India in 1964, in alphabetical order.

== 1964 ==
Title	Director	Production	Music	Cast	Release date (D-M-Y)
Aandavan Kattalai	K. Shankar	P. S. V Pictures	Viswanathan–Ramamoorthy	Sivaji Ganesan, Devika, J. P. Chandrababu	12-06-1964
Alli	S. S. Rajendran	Rajendran Pictures	K. V. Mahadevan	S. S. Rajendran, C. R. Vijayakumari, Sowcar Janaki	
Amma Engey	G. Vishwanathan	Modern Theaters	Vedha	R. Muthuraman, Chandrakantha, Rajasree, R. S. Manohar, A. Veerappan	27-11-1964
Arunagirinathar	T. R. Ramanna	Baba Art Productions	G. Ramanathan & T. R. Pappa	T. M. Soundararajan, M. R. Radha, B. S. Saroja, C. Lakshmi Rajyam, Sharada	07-02-1964
Aayiram Roobai	K. S. Gopalakrishnan	Chitra Productions	K. V. Mahadevan	Gemini Ganesan, Savitri, Nagesh	
Bommai	Veenai S. Balachander	S. B. Creations	S. Balachander	S. Balachander, L. Vijayalakshmi, V. Gopalakrishnan, V. S. Raghavan	22-04-1964
Chitrangi	R. S. Mani	Modern Theaters	Vedha	Pushpalatha, R. S. Manohar, A. V. M. Rajan	
Deiva Thai	P. Madhavan	Satya Movies	Viswanathan–Ramamoorthy	M. G. Ramachandran, B. Sarojadevi, Nagesh	18-07-1964
Deiva Thirumagal	Sandow M. M. A. Chinnappa Thevar	Dhandayuthapani Films	P. S. Diwakar	S. A. Ashokan, R. Muthuraman, Chandrakantha, Nalini, Nagesh, Manorama	22-05-1964
En Kadamai	M. Natesan	Natesa Pictures	Viswanathan–Ramamoorthy	M. G. Ramachandran, B. Sarojadevi, M. R. Radha, K. Balaji	13-03-1964
Kai Kodutha Deivam	K. S. Gopalakrishnan	Shri Ponni Pictures	Viswanathan–Ramamoorthy	Sivaji Ganesan, Savitri, S. V. Ranga Rao	18-07-1964
Kalai Kovil	C. V. Sridhar	Bagyalakshmi Production	Viswanathan–Ramamoorthy	Muthuraman, Chandrakantha, Rajasri	25-09-1964
Karnan	B. R. Panthulu	Padmini Pictures	Viswanathan–Ramamoorthy	N. T. Rama Rao, Sivaji Ganesan, Savitri	14-01-1964
Karuppu Panam	G. R. Nathan	Vijayalakshmi Pictures	Viswanathan–Ramamoorthy	Kannadasan, K. Sarangapani, T. S. Balaiah, K. Balaji, K. R. Vijaya	01-02-1964
Kadhalikka Neramillai	C. V. Sridhar	Chitralaya Films	Viswanathan–Ramamoorthy	Ravichandran, R. Muthuraman, Rajasree, Kanchana, Nagesh	
Maayamani; Dubbed from Hindi	Babubhai Mistri	Kantibhai Parikh	Laxmikant Pyarelal	Mahipal; Geetanjali	
Magaley Un Samathu	D. S. Rajagopal	Thirumagal Films	G. K. Venkatesh	C. L. Anandan, M. R. Radha, 'Gemini' chandra, Manorama, Rajasree	
Muradan Muthu	B. R. Panthulu	Padmini Pictures	T. G. Lingappa	Sivaji Ganesan, Devika, B. R. Panthulu	03-11-1964
Nalvaravu	Charlie / Manian	S. V. Movies	T. Chalapathi Rao	R. Muthuraman, Pushpalatha, E. V. Saroja, Nagesh	05-03-1964
Nanum Manidhandhaan	A. Sheshagiri Rao	Anandan Movies	G. K. Venkatesh	C. L. Anandan, R. Muthuraman, Chandrakantha, Sheela, Nagesh	13-04-1964
Navarathri	A. P. Nagarajan	Sri Vijayalakshmi Pictures	K. V. Mahadevan	Sivaji Ganesan, Savitri, Nagesh	03-11-1964
Pachhai Vilakku	A. Bhim Singh	A. V. M. Productions	Viswanathan–Ramamoorthy	Sivaji Ganesan, S. S. Rajendran, C. R. Vijayakumari	04-03-1964
Padagotti	T. Prakash Rao	Saravana Pictures	Viswanathan–Ramamoorthy	M. G. Ramachandran, B. Saroja Devi, Nagesh	03-11-1964
Panakkara Kudumbam	T. R. Ramanna	R. R. Pictures	Viswanathan–Ramamoorthy	M. G. Ramachandran, B. Saroja Devi, R. S. Manohar	24-04-1964
Pasamum Nesamum	D. Yoganand	Alankar Pictures	Vedha	Gemini Ganesan, B. Saroja Devi, M. V. Rajamma	26-01-1964
Poompuhar	P. Neelakantan	Mekala Pictures	R. Sudarsanam	S. S. Rajendran, K. B. Sundarambal, C. R. Vijayakumari, Rajasree	
Puthiya Paravai	Dadha Mirasi	Sivaji Films	Viswanathan–Ramamoorthy	Sivaji Ganesan, B. Saroja Devi, Sowcar Janaki	
Rishyasringar	Mukkamala	Geetha Pictures (Ravanam Brothers)	T. V. Raju	K. Balaji, Gummadi, Pattu Iyer, L. Narayana Rao, Nagayya, Rajasulochana, Girija	
Server Sundaram	Krishnan–Panju	A. V. M. Productions	Viswanathan–Ramamoorthy	Nagesh, R. Muthuraman, K. R. Vijaya	11-12-1964
Thaayin Madiyil	A. Subbarao	Annai Films	S. M. Subbaiah Naidu	M. G. Ramachandran, B. Saroja Devi, M. N. Nambiar	18-12-1964
Thozhilali	M. A. Thirumugam	Devar Films	K. V. Mahadevan	M. G. Ramachandran, K. R. Vijaya, Rathna	25-10-1964
Ullasa Payanam	Sathyam	Salem Movies	K. V. Mahadevan	S. S. Rajendran, Vijayakumari, K. A. Thangavelu, M. R. Radha	
Vazhi Piranthadu	A. K. Velan	Arunachalam Pictures	K. V. Mahadevan	S. S. Rajendran, C. R. Vijayakumari, M. R. Radha	
Vazhkai Vazhvatharke	Krishnan–Panju	Kamaal Brothers	Viswanathan–Ramamoorthy	Gemini Ganesan, B. Saroja Devi, S. A. Ashokan	
Veeraadhi Veeran; Dubbed from Telugu	B. Vittalacharya; Dialogues and lyrics:Puratchidasan	Sri Vittal Combines	Rajan–Nagendra	N. T. Rama Rao, Krishna Kumari, Rajasree, Rajanala, V. Nagayya, Satyanarayana, Mukkamala, Balakrishna, Maduukuri Satyam, Jayanthi, Brundavana Chowdary	
Veeranganai	A. S. A. Sami	Oriental Pictures	Vedha	Gemini Ganesan, Padmini, Ragini	
Vengai Nattu Veeran	T. R. Raghunath	Rajalakshmi Productions	S. V. Venkatraman		
Vettaikkaran	M. A. Thirumugam	Devar Films	K. V. Mahadevan	M. G. Ramachandran, Savitri, Nagesh M. R. Radha, Asogan, Nambiar, Manorama	14-01-1964
