= Vallavan Oruvan =

- Theatrical release poster
- Directed by: R. Sundaram
- Written by: A. L. Narayanan
- Produced by: T. R. Sundaram
- Starring: Jaishankar; L. Vijayalakshmi
- Cinematography: C. A. S. Mani
- Edited by: L. Balu
- Music by: Vedha
- Production company: Modern Theatres
- Release date: 11 November 1966
- Running time: 147 minutes
- Country: India
- Language: Tamil

Vallavan Oruvan (transl. A capable man) is a 1966 Indian Tamil-language spy thriller film, directed by R. Sundaram and written by A. L. Narayanan. Produced by Modern Theatres, with music composed by Vedha, the film stars Jaishankar and L. Vijayalakshmi. Based on the early James Bond Films like Dr.No and From Russia with Love and 1964 French film Shadow of Evil, it was released on 11 November 1966.

== Plot ==
A dangerous gang manufactures firearms and explosives, uses them for looting, derailing trains and disrupting law and order. They make bombs using sulphur from a match factory in Madras. A C.I.D. officer who is deputed to investigate these cases at Madras, finds several clues, reaches the factory and gets killed there. To investigate the case and to find who killed him, another CID officer Shankar is deputed by the D.I.G. of Bombay. Shankar reaches Madras and from the time of landing, is followed by his enemies. Kumar at the Madras office assists him in the investigations.

Shankar faces several challenges and dangers and several attempts are made to kill him. He falls in love with Tara, sister of Sargunam, a doctor. Shankar's Madras office head unearths crucial information on the sulphur allotted for a match factory getting diverted to another place for making the explosives and firearms. But before he is able to report the complete information, he is murdered. Shankar's personal assistants Susi and Rajini are part of the gang and are instrumental in passing information about the investigations to the gang. They separately try to seduce Shankar, but fail.

Sargunam advises Tara to send Shankar out of Madras so that his life is not in danger. She drugs him to take him out of the city, then realises brother's intention is not to save Shankar, but to make him confess details of his investigations. However, Shankar, who was pretending to be drugged, wakes up and beats the people who try to get his confession; instead he makes them confess about their illegal activities. He learns that the gang leader Black Cat employs anti-socials and ex-convicts to make explosives and firearms, which he sells at phenomenal profit to anti-national and terrorist organisations.

With the help of Tara, Kumar and Kumar's girlfriend Ammukutty, Shankar reaches the match factory and follows the lorry which takes the sulphur to the factory where the bombs are made. He also finds Black Cat, revealed to be Sargunam. In the ensuing fight, Sargunam is killed and his factory torched, but Shankar, Tara, Kumar and Ammukutty escape unharmed.

== Cast ==
Male cast

- Jaishankar as C.I.D. Shankar
- Thengai Srinivasan as Kumar
- K. K. Soundar as I.G.
- Manohar as Dr. Sargunam

Female cast

- L. Vijayalakshmi as Tara
- R. Sheela as Susi
- Pushpamala as Ammukutty
- Vijaya Lalitha as Rajini

== Production ==
Judo Rathnam began his career as a stunt master with this film.

== Soundtrack ==
Music was composed by Vedha and lyrics were written by Kannadasan. The song "Palinginal Oru Maligai" is based on Artie Shaw's version of "Frenesi". Another song " Ammamma kannaththil" was based on "Amore" by British singer Tony Brent.

Track listing
No.	Title	Singer(s)	Length
1.	"Ammamma Kannathil"	L. R. Eswari	2:52
2.	"Palinginal Oru Maligai"	L. R. Eswari	3:28
3.	"Thottu Thottu Padava"	T. M. Soundararajan, P. Susheela	3:45
4.	"Innum Parthukondirunthal"	T. M. Soundararajan, P. Susheela	3:58
5.	"Muthu Ponnu Vamma"	T. M. Soundararajan, P. Susheela	4:05
Total length:			18:08

== Release and reception ==
Vallavan Oruvan was released on 11 November 1966. Ananda Vikatan said, "The film gives a feeling of watching a Hollywood film... One should watch this film for a good time pass". Kalki praised the performances of Jaishankar and Manohar, but criticised that of Vijayalakshmi. The critic also appreciated the comedy of Srinivasan and Pushpamala, the audiography, cinematography and outdoor photography.

== Legacy ==
After the film's success, "CID Shankar" became a common name used for Jaishankar's characters in other unrelated films, including Neelagiri Express (1968) and CID Shankar (1970).

== Bibliography ==
- Dhananjayan, G. (2011). The Best of Tamil Cinema, 1931 to 2010: 1931–1976. Galatta Media. OCLC 733724281.
- Ramnarine, Tina K., ed. (2017). Global Perspectives on Orchestras: Collective Creativity and Social Agency. Oxford University Press. ISBN 978-0-19-935224-1.
