= Unakkaga Naan =

- Theatrical release poster
- Directed by: C. V. Rajendran
- Written by: A. L. Narayanan (dialogues)
- Story by: Gulzar
- Produced by: K. Balaji
- Starring: Sivaji Ganesan; Gemini Ganesan; Lakshmi; Vennira Aadai Nirmala
- Cinematography: Masthan
- Edited by: B. Kanthasamy
- Music by: M. S. Viswanathan
- Production company: Sujatha Cine Arts
- Release date: 12 February 1976
- Country: India
- Language: Tamil

Unakkaga Naan (transl. I'm There for You) is a 1976 Indian Tamil-language drama film produced by K. Balaji and directed by C. V. Rajendran. Starring Sivaji Ganesan, Gemini Ganesan, Lakshmi, and Vennira Aadai Nirmala, it is a remake of the 1973 Hindi film Namak Haraam which also starred Gemini Ganesan's daughter Rekha. The film was released on 12 February 1976.

== Plot ==
Raja and Ramu are two good friends who are as close as brothers going on to wear the same clothes with both willing to die or kill for each other. Raja, the rich one of the two faces many challenges after attempting to tackle a union leader at Raja's mill. He is also insulted by the same union leader. Ramu swears revenge, changes his name to Shankar, joins Raja's factory, impresses the workers, climbs up the ranks and eventually becomes the union leader only for him to realize that the union leader Dharmalingam was right and the labour was living in abject poverty taking up the fight against his friend. Things get awry when their friendship becomes known to the workers who later understand that he is now on their side. In the end, Ramu dies fighting for the workers due to the nexus between Raja's father and the corrupt manager causing Raja to give up all his properties and take up Ramu's work.

== Cast ==
- Sivaji Ganesan as Raja
- Gemini Ganesan as Ramu/Sankar
- Lakshmi as Radha
- Vennira Aadai Nirmala as Meena
- K. Balaji as Netti
- Major Sundarrajan as Chakravarthi
- S. V. Subbaiah as Dharmalingam
- R. S. Manohar as Arjunan
- S. V. Ramadas as Bar fighter
- V. K. Ramasamy as Alvar
- Manorama as Arasangam
- Nagesh as Dhanarajan alias Lenindasan
- Manimala as Vido Sister
- Y. G. Mahendran as Panjam
- Typist Gopu as Senior Lawyer
- V. K. Padmini as Parvathi
- T. V. Kumuthini as Ramu and Parvathi Mother
- Baby Indira as Arasangam Assistant
- Gemini Balu as Arujunan Lorry Cleaner

== Soundtrack ==
The soundtrack was composed by M. S. Viswanathan, with lyrics by Kannadasan.

Track listing
No.	Title	Singer(s)	Length
1.	"Kadhal Kathai"	S. P. Balasubrahmanyam, Vani Jairam
2.	"Imai Thotta"	T. M. Soundararajan, K. J. Yesudas
3.	"Iraivan Ulagathai"	K. J. Yesudas
4.	"Kaadu Kanda"	S. C. Krishnan, L. R. Anjali
5.	"Nee Ennai"	L. R. Eswari

== Critical reception ==
Kanthan of Kalki praised the performances of star cast, cinematography as highlight and Narayanan's dialogues as short and sweet. Naagai Dharuman of Navamani praised the acting, music, dialogues, cinematography and direction.
