= Raja Veettu Kannukkutty =

- Theatrical release poster
- Directed by: C. V. Rajendran
- Written by: Chitralaya Gopu
- Produced by: P. Ramdass; B. Ramanan
- Starring: Prabhu; Viji; S. V. Shekar; V. K. Ramasamy
- Cinematography: P. Bhaskar Rao; P. Suryaprakash
- Edited by: Chandran-Muthu
- Music by: M. S. Viswanathan
- Production company: Preeti Creations
- Release date: 16 March 1984
- Running time: 129 minutes
- Country: India
- Language: Tamil

Raja Veettu Kannukkutty (transl. Youngest lad in king's home) is a 1984 Indian Tamil-language film, directed by C. V. Rajendran and produced by P. Ramdass and B. Ramanan. The film stars Prabhu, Viji, S. V. Shekar and V. K. Ramasamy. It was released on 16 March 1984.

== Plot ==
Raju is a wealthy factory owner known for his suspicious nature and constant fault-finding, leading him to reject nineteen marriage proposals. However, he is instantly drawn to Pavithra, a bold and outspoken young woman, and their families soon arrange their marriage after a formal engagement. Even before the wedding, Raju becomes excessively possessive and dictates how she should dress, eat, and behave. Wanting to be an obedient wife, Pavithra initially agrees, but his controlling attitude—especially his insistence that she avoid speaking to other men in public—gradually begins to suffocate her.

Siva, a wealthy plantation owner from Malaysia, arrives in India to spend a month with his sister Janaki and her husband Ravi. Ravi is irresponsible and addicted to gambling, drinking, and clubbing, accumulating heavy debts. When moneylenders come demanding repayment, Siva drives them away, asking them to confront Ravi instead of troubling the family. Desperate and unwilling to face consequences, Ravi secretly conspires with the moneylenders to kidnap his son, Babu, hoping they will extort money from Janaki.

Siva suspects Ravi but cannot believe he would stoop so low. He agrees to deliver the ransom of ₹50,000 (equivalent to ₹780,000 or US$9,200 in 2023) to rescue Babu. Meanwhile, Pavithra leaves Madras to stay with her grandparents before her wedding. On the way, her car breaks down near the very location where the kidnappers are waiting for Janaki. Mistaking Pavithra for Babu's mother, they threaten her, but Siva intervenes and saves her, sustaining injuries in the process. The kidnappers accidentally take Pavithra's suitcase, believing it to be Siva's. She helps the injured Siva reach Dr. Ramamurthy, who is Siva's friend. She stays the night to assist, then continues to her grandparents' Neelamalai estate bungalow in Ooty. The kidnappers later return Pavithra's suitcase and again demand the ransom, still assuming she is Janaki.

Determined to save Babu, Pavithra contacts Siva and asks him to come to Ooty. She arranges for Siva to stay in the bungalow. The receptionist, Renu, develops a playful crush on Siva, but he does not reciprocate. To avoid putting Babu at risk, Pavithra volunteers to deliver the ransom alone. Siva secretly follows and intervenes again, defeating the goons. The kidnappers now suspect Ravi of manipulating events, as Siva repeatedly foils their plans. Meanwhile, Pavithra and Siva continue searching for Babu, and Siva begins developing romantic feelings for Pavithra. Ravi, fearing for his son's safety, pleads with Pavithra to hand over the ransom and promises he has reformed. He asks her not to inform Siva, fearing Siva's anger might complicate matters further.

Back in Madras, Raju grows furious when Pavithra does not answer his calls promptly. Also, Babu escapes from the kidnappers, who then substitute another boy to impersonate him. The ransom suitcase goes missing, forcing Pavithra—under Siva's guidance—to deliver a decoy box filled with stones. Siva quickly realizes the boy is not his nephew, and both he and Pavithra begin searching for the real Babu and the missing money. Babu hides inside a dilapidated estate bungalow belonging to Pavithra's family, now managed by her uncle Ramesh, who is comically afraid of ghosts while secretly courting a visitor's daughter, Rani. Siva confesses his love to Pavithra, but she rejects him, reminding him that she is engaged to Raju. Her grandmother also warns Siva to maintain distance.

Raju learns from an employee that Pavithra is traveling with another man and rushes to Ooty in anger. To avoid misunderstandings, Pavithra asks Siva to leave temporarily. When kidnappers call again demanding money, she cleverly convinces Raju it is merely research for a writer friend's story. Raju behaves arrogantly toward her grandparents, who feel Siva would be a better match for Pavithra. Though confused by her growing respect for Siva, Pavithra reminds herself—after her grandmother's advice—that an engaged woman must honor her commitment like a married one.

Eventually, the kidnappers demand money near the same abandoned bungalow where Babu is hiding. Pavithra arranges funds to protect Ravi. Babu discovers Siva's missing suitcase there and tries to escape with it but is caught. The kidnappers beat both Ravi and Babu until Siva arrives with Pavithra and rescues them. The next day, newspapers publish a story praising "lovers" Siva and Pavithra for saving the child. Raju, outraged, confronts Pavithra's father and questions her character. Siva accompanies Pavithra back to Madras as her wedding approaches, intending only to thank her family. Instead, her parents scold him for associating with an engaged woman. Raju angrily rebukes Pavithra as well—but this time she stands up to him, accusing him of mistrust and lack of empathy.

Declaring she cannot marry someone who doubts her integrity, Pavithra calls off the wedding. She rushes to the airport to confess her feelings to Siva, but he stops her. Raju follows, now desperate to reconcile. Siva, recognizing Pavithra's emotional confusion, counsels Raju to change his ways. He advises Pavithra to reconsider, believing reconciliation will bring peace to both families. A transformed Raju acknowledges his mistakes and promises to respect Pavithra's individuality. After ensuring their reunion, Siva returns to Malaysia.

== Cast ==
- Prabhu as Siva
- Viji as Pavithra
- S. V. Shekar as Raju
- V. K. Ramasamy as Pavithra's maternal grandfather
- Manorama as Sundari, Pavithra's grandmother
- Nizhalgal Ravi as Ravi
- Vadivukkarasi as Janaki
- K. R. Indira Devi as Raju's mother
- Y. G. Mahendran as Ramesh
- Anuradha as Renu, receptionist
- M. R. Krishnamurthy as Sundaresan
- Oru Viral Krishna Rao as a tourist bungalow guest
- Kathadi Ramamurthy as Dr.Ramamurthy
- Lavanya
- Renuka
- Manager Cheena as Raju's factory employee

== Production ==
A scene where Prabhu captures scenery was shot at Ooty.

== Soundtrack ==
Soundtrack was composed by M. S. Viswanathan and lyrics were written by Vaali.

Track listing
No.	Title	Singer(s)	Length
1.	"Karpanai Vaanil"	S. P. Balasubrahmanyam
2.	"Angami Surangami"	Vani Jairam
3.	"Summayirunthavanai Soodu Kilappi"	Malaysia Vasudevan
4.	"Kannmani Un Thirumanam"	Vani Jairam
