= Naangu Killadigal =

- Theatrical release poster
- Directed by: L. Balu
- Written by: A. L. Narayanan
- Starring: Jaishankar; Anandan; Thengai Srinivasan; Suruli Rajan; Bharathi; Pushpamala; Kumari Padmini
- Cinematography: C. A. S. Mani
- Edited by: L. Balu
- Music by: Vedha
- Production company: Modern Theatres
- Release date: 25 September 1969
- Running time: 138 minutes
- Country: India
- Language: Tamil

Naangu Killadigal (transl. Four clever men) is a 1969 Indian Tamil-language crime comedy film edited and directed by L. Balu. The film has an ensemble cast including Jaishankar, Anandan, Thengai Srinivasan, Suruli Rajan, Bharathi, Pushpamala and Kumari Padmini. It revolves around four men producing a film, raising funds by committing crimes.

Naangu Killadigal was produced by Modern Theatres and written by A. L. Narayanan. It was released on 25 September 1969.

== Plot ==
Four ex-convicts come together to produce a film, repeating their crimes of theft to raise funds.

== Cast ==
Male cast

- Jaishankar as Anandan (a) Kumar
- Anandan as Narendran
- Thengai Srinivasan as Velu (a) Natanam
- Suruli Rajan as Baba (a) Bhai
- Moorthy as Thandavam
- A. L. Narayanan as Tape Singaram
- Sivasooriyan as Bioscope
- Karikol Raju as Santhosh Kumari's father
- Krishna Rao as Narendran's secretary
- Chandran as Alwar
- Ramanathan as Rowdy Varadhan
- Manohar as Ganesan Iyer

Female cast

- Bharathi as Santhosh Kumari
- Pushpamala as Pushpa (a) Pappa
- Kumari Padmini as Prema
- Ramani as Santhosh Kumari's mother

== Production ==
Naangu Killadigal was the 107th venture of Modern Theatres.

== Soundtrack ==
Music was by Vedha. Lyrics were written by Kannadasan and A. L. Narayanan.

Song	Singers	Length
"Sevvaanathil Oru Natchathiram"	T. M. Soundararajan, P. Susheela	03:22
"Nenjikku Nimmathi"	P. Susheela	03:19
"Ethu Ethile"	P. Susheela, L. R. Eswari	03:17
"Pookkadi Pakkam"	S. V. Ponnusamy, L. R. Eswari	03:56

== Release and reception ==
Naangu Killadigal was released on 25 September 1969. The Indian Express wrote, "The main defect of the movie is that you do not know where the parody ends and where they are serious. It is very much like the story of a person who cut his nose to spite his face. The movie is like an unrehearsed amateur drama".
