= K. R. Indira Devi =

Indian Tamil actress

- Old Portrait of K.R Indira devi
- Born: Kancheepuram Ramasamy Indira Devi; 1 January 1949; Kancheepuram, British India
- Died: 16 March 2017 (aged 68); Chennai, Tamil Nadu, India
- Other names: Indira, Indira Devi
- Occupations: Actress, Dubbing Artiste
- Years active: 1959–2017
- Spouse: Sankara Narayanan
- Children: Jayageetha (daughter)
- Parent: K. S. Ramasamy (father)
- Relatives: Anuradha (Sister)
- Awards: Kalaimamani Awards

K. R. Indira Devi (1949–2017) was an Indian actress who was active in Tamil Cinema during the latter half of the 20th century. She was well known for her supporting roles, but was also a successful dubbing artist. In a career spanning close to five decades, she acted in more than 250 Tamil, Telugu, Kannada and Malayalam films. Indira debuted as heroine in Konjum Kumari (1963). She was awarded the Kalaimamani by the Government of Tamil Nadu.

== Early life ==
Indira Devi was born in the Kanchipuram district. At the age of 14, she moved to Chennai and joined drama troupe and began performance in stage plays. Then she entered film industry and started her career in Supporting role. In 1959, she acted with Kann Thirandhathu starring Mynavathi under the direction of K. V. Srinivasan produced by Narayanan Companies and she was the onscreen pair for A. Karunanidhi. She made her acting debut as heroine with Konjum Kumari starring R. S. Manohar and Manorama under the direction of G. Viswanathan and produced by Modern Theatres in 1963. Indira was the onscreen pair for M. N. Nambiar in MGR's Petralthan Pillaiya (1966), Gemini Ganesan in Sumaithaangi (1962) and M. R. Radha in Hello Mister Zamindar (1965). She starred with Sivaji Ganesan, and Sivakumar. She acted in more than 250 films in the Tamil and other Indian languages, the notable ones being Kandhan Karunai, Sindhu Bhairavi, and with superstar Rajinikanth in films such as Mannan, and Panakkaran. Her last film was Girivalam (2005) where she played Granny to Richard Rishi. Indira acted in many television serials, and worked as a dubbing artist in more than 500 films.

== Other works ==
Indira also worked as a heroine in the film Konjum Kumari. The film also marked versatile actress Manorama raised to the status of heroine. The film was made by editor-turned-director G. Viswanathan. The film was Modern Theatres' 100th film. T. R. Sundaram's last film. Indira worked along with Sivaji Ganesan and S. S. Rajendran in R. K. S. drama troupe, and with Sivaji Ganesan's stage play named as Thenkkoodu.

== Personal life ==
Indira's father K. S. Ramasamy was a popular Carnatic singer as well as a stage artiste. Indira is also the elder sister of popular dubbing artist Anuradha and mother of dubbing artist Jayageetha. Indira was married to Shankara Narayanan and they have one daughter, named Jayageetha.

== Death ==
On 16 March 2017, Indira Devi was admitted to hospital in Chennai for respiratory problems and died following a Cardiac arrest. She was 68 years old. A number of Tamil film celebrities including Secretary Vishal, Vice-president Ponvannan, and General council members Udhaya and Hemachander from Nadigar Sangam visited her place and paid their obeisance.

== Award ==
- Kalaimamani award by Government of Tamil Nadu.

== Partial filmography ==
Indira Devi acted in more than 250 films.

=== Tamil ===
Year	Movie	Role	Notes
1959	Kan Thiranthathu	Chinnayi	
1962	Paadha Kaanikkai		
1962	Sumaithaangi		
1963	Konjum Kumari	Manickam	Debut Film as Heroine
1963	Kunkhumam	Rani	
1964	Vazhkai Vazhvatharke		
1965	Hello Mister Zamindar		
1966	Petralthan Pillaiya		
1967	Kandhan Karunai		
1968	Sathiyam Thavaradhey		
1970	Enga Mama		
1970	Yaen?		
1970	Paadhukaappu		
1971	Moondru Dheivangal	Koteeswaran's duplicate lover	
1971	Sabatham	Yasodha	
1973	Pookkari		
1974	Athaiya Mamiya		
1976	Dasavatharam	Thalambu	
1979	Gnana Kuzhandhai		
1979	Azhiyatha Kolangal		
1980	Ilamai Kolam		
1981	Velichathukku Vaaga		
1982	Anandha Ragam		
1983	Yuga Dharmam		
1984	Raja Veettu Kannukkutty		
1985	Sindhu Bhairavi		
1985	Sri Raghavendrar		
1990	Panakkaran		
1991	Jenma Natchathram	Mrs. Elizabeth	Remake of The Omen (1976)
1991	Paattondru Ketten		
1991	Puriyaadha Pudhir		
1992	Mannan		
1994	Magalir Mattum		
2005	Girivalam	Giriprasad's grandmother	Remake of Hindi film Humraaz

=== Kannada ===
Year	Movie	Role	Notes
1963	Mana Mecchida Madadi		
1968	Mannina Maga		
1970	Vaagdaana		
1970	Devara Makkalu		
1975	Thrimurthy		
1977	Bayasade Banda Bhagya		
1977	Chinna Ninna Muddaduve		
1978	Suli		
1981	Keralida Simha		
1984	Onde Raktha		
