= Manimala (actress) =

Indian actress

- Born: Manimala
- Occupation: Actress
- Years active: 1963-1992
- Spouse(s): Vennira Aadai Moorthy (m.1966)
- Children: 1

Manimala is an Indian actress, who appeared predominantly in Tamil movie industry, in lead and supporting roles. She has acted in movies such as Anbu Karangal, Vallavanukku Vallavan, Motor Sundaram Pillai and Periya Idathu Penn.

== Filmography ==
This list is incomplete; you can help by expanding it.

=== Tamil ===
1. Periya Idathu Penn (1963)...Thillaiammal
2. Panakkara Kudumbam (1964)...Sivagami
3. Anbu Karangal (1965)...Anandhi
4. Kaakum Karangal (1965)
5. Anandhi (1965)...Sivakami
6. Thazhampoo (1965)...Pakiyum
7. Vallavanukku Vallavan (1965)...Geeta
8. Poojaikku Vandha Malar (1965)...Mãlã
9. Motor Sundaram Pillai (1966)
10. Ethirigal Jakkirathai (1967)...Lakshmi
11. Paal Manam (1967)
12. Karpooram (1967)
13. Nilave Nee Satchi (1970)
14. Kalyana Oorvalam (1970)
15. Patham Pasali (1970)
16. Justice Viswanathan (1971)...Kanchana
17. Maalai Sooda Vaa (1976)
18. Annakili (1976)
19. Unakkaga Naan (1976)
20. Kavari Maan (1979)
21. Mattravai Neril (1980)
22. Theeratha Vilayattu Pillai (1982)
23. Samayapurathu Satchi (1983)
24. Anbulla Rajinikanth (1984)
25. Sindhu Bhairavi (1985)...Sindhu's mother
26. Janani (1985)
27. Nallavan (1988)...Guru and Raja's mother
28. Rickshaw Mama (1992)...Sridevi's Maid

=== Telugu ===
1. Eedu Jodu (1963)
2. Leta Manasulu (1966)
3. Pidugu Ramudu (1966)...Hema
4. Suguna Sundari Katha (1970)...Panchala Princess, Padma
5. Marina Manishi (1970)...Janaki
6. Atthalu Kodallu (1971)...Radha Kumari
7. Manasu Mangalyam (1971)...Amrutha
8. Basti Bulbul (1971)
9. Chelleli Kapuram (1971)
10. Andala Ramudu (1973)...Raani
11. Rowdy Police (1987)
12. Rocky (1988)
13. Seetharatnam Gari Abbayi (1992)

=== Kannada ===
1. Mr. Rajkumar (1970)

=== Malayalam ===
1. Kanyakumari (1974)
2. Rasaleela (1975)
3. Ithaanente Vazhi (1978)...Seetha
4. Vivahithare Ithile (1986)
5. Rithubhedam (1987)
6. Midhya (1990)
7. Pookkalam Varavayi (1991)
