= Pattakkathi Bhairavan =

- Theatrical release poster
- Directed by: V. B. Rajendra Prasad
- Written by: Aaroor Dass (dialogues)
- Story by: Dasari Narayana Rao
- Produced by: V. B. Rajendra Prasad
- Starring: Sivaji Ganesan; Jayasudha; Sridevi
- Cinematography: V. S. R. Swamy
- Edited by: K. R. Sanjeevi
- Music by: Ilaiyaraaja
- Production company: Jagapathi Art Pictures
- Release date: 19 October 1979
- Country: India
- Language: Tamil

Pattakkathi Bhairavan (transl. Gauntlet-sword Bhairavan) is a 1979 Indian Tamil-language action film directed by V. B. Rajendra Prasad, starring Sivaji Ganesan, Jai Ganesh, Sridevi and Jayasudha. It is a remake of the 1978 Telugu film Katakataala Rudrayya. The film was released on 19 October 1979.

== Plot ==
Arun and Malathi are the son and daughter of two rich businessmen and are lovers about to be married, when Arun tragically dies in a bike accident. Malathi later gives birth to a male child, fathered by Arun before his death. Malathi's father who fears for his family's reputation as the child was born out of wedlock, deceives Malathi that the child was stillborn and dumps the baby in a garbage bin. The child is discovered in the bin by a car driver Seenu and raised by him and his wife who are childless and they name the child Thangaraja. Seenu and his wife later have a daughter of their own.

Thangaraja grows up with an angry temperament and gets infuriated when berated by other children who call him 'kuppai thotti' (garbage bin) referring to where he was found as a baby. Once he badly beats up the son of his father's boss Dharmalingam after such an insult and fearing punishment, runs away from home, never to be found by his parents.

Time passes and Thangaraja turns up in his adulthood as Pattakkathi Bhairavan, a notorious criminal sought by the police for several murders which he commits using his customary pattakkathi (gauntlet-sword). He takes orders for his crimes from a mysterious man called the 'boss'. During one such criminal assignment, he is tasked by his boss to kill a child but can't go through with it and when he tries to return the child back to its mother, he gets arrested. When in jail, he encounters his adopted father Seenu and learns how Seenu's boss Dharmalingam had ruined his adopted family. After escaping from prison, he learns that Dharmalingam is the same man known as the 'boss' whom he works for and murders him. While fleeing after the murder he has a chance encounter with Malathi, who is stunned by his resemblance to Arun.

As the Police launch a manhunt for him, Bhairavan camouflages himself as Karnan, a rich businessman to deceive the Police and also is reunited with his step-sister Deepa. Deepa's close friend Roopa is Bhairavan's romantic interest, but in a twist, Deepa herself is in love with police officer Arjunan, who is the son of Malathi and her police officer husband whom she had married after Arun's demise. Arjunan is actually on a mission to find and eliminate the elusive Pattakkathi Bhairavan. Bhairavan approaches and interacts with Arjunan quite convincingly masquerading as businessman Karnan, but Malathi recognises Bhairavan/Karnan as none other than her own first son whom she had borne out of wedlock, but struggles to tell him the truth, since he professes a profound hatred for his unknown mother, who he believes had dumped him in a garbage bin as a baby. Meanwhile, tipped off by a jail superintendent familiar with Bhairavan, Arjunan and his father begin to suspect Karnan's identity. How the events unfold form the rest of the story.

== Cast ==
- Sivaji Ganesan as Bhairavan/Karnan and Arun
- Jayasudha as Roopa
- Sridevi as Deepa
- Sowcar Janaki as Malathi
- Jai Ganesh as Arjunan
- R. S. Manohar as Dharmalingam
- Thengai Srinivasan as Seenu
- Major Sundarrajan
- A. R. Srinivasan
- Pushpalatha
- Poornam Viswanathan
- Usilai Mani
- Tarunraj as young Bhairavan

== Production ==
The filming began at Annapurna Studios. Jagannatha Reddy, the then Revenue Department Minister of Andhra Pradesh, clapped the first shot.

== Soundtrack ==
The music was composed by Ilaiyaraaja, with lyrics by Kannadasan.

Song	Singers	Length
"Boot Polish"	P. Susheela, S. Janaki	4:01
"Nenjukkulle Singakkutti"	P. Susheela, S. Janaki	4:13
"Varuvai Kannaa Neeraada"	S. P. Balasubrahmanyam, P. Susheela	4:15
"Devadhai Oru Devathai"	S. P. Balasubrahmanyam, S. Janaki	4:03
"Yengengo Sellum"	S. P. Balasubrahmanyam, S. Janaki	4:30
"Yaaro Neeyum Naanum"	S. P. Balasubrahmanyam	3:57

== Critical reception ==
Kausikan of Kalki felt the pattakkathi (gauntlet-sword) failed to shine.
