= Oru Viral =

- Theatrical release poster
- Directed by: C. M. V. Raman
- Written by: Thangam; C. M. V. Raman
- Produced by: Salvador Fernandes
- Starring: Krishna Rao; Thengai Srinivasan
- Cinematography: T. G. Sekar
- Music by: Vedha
- Production company: Associate Artists
- Release date: 17 December 1965
- Country: India
- Language: Tamil

Oru Viral (transl. A Finger) is a 1965 Indian Tamil-language mystery film written and directed by C. M. V. Raman. The film stars Krishna Rao and Thengai Srinivasan in their acting debut, along with K. Kannan, Prem Anand, Pandarinath, Malaysia Radhika, V. R. Thilakam and Meenakumari. It was released on 17 December 1965 and emerged a success.

== Plot ==
A rich man, who has two sons, is murdered, and a hunt for the murderer ensues. Stories of a haunting skeleton circulate in the estate owned by the murdered man. An employee of the estate (Kannan), who is actually an absconding convict, is being chased by a CID officer (Srinivasan) who obtains work in the estate to monitor him.

== Cast ==
- Krishna Rao
- Thengai Srinivasan as a CID officer
- K. Kannan
- Prem Anand
- Pandarinath
- Malaysia Radhika
- V. R. Thilakam
- Meenakumari

== Production ==
Oru Viral was written and directed by C. M. V. Raman. The dialogues were written by Thangam. At a period when murder mysteries and detective stories were not exploited as genres in Tamil cinema, it was a "surprise package", being made on a shoestring budget with artistes who were then newcomers or less popular. Krishna Rao and Thengai Srinivasan made their acting debut with this film, and the film's title became prefixed to Krishna Rao's name. Other supporting actors included K. Kannan, Prem Anand, Pandarinath, Malaysia Radhika, V. R. Thilakam and Meenakumari. Salvador Fernandez, also a newcomer, produced the film under the production company Associate Pictures. T. G. Sekar handled the cinematography.

== Soundtrack ==
The music was composed by Vedha and the lyrics were written by Alangudi Somu. Two songs from the film — "Malligai Mottu Sangetuthu" and "Ungal Thevai Ennavendru" — attained popularity.

Track listing
No.	Title	Singer(s)	Length
1.	"Malligai Mottu Sangetuthu"	P. Susheela
2.	"Ungal Thevai Ennavendru"	T. M. Soundararajan, P. Susheela
3.	"Badhil Ondru Tharavendum"	P. Susheela

== Release and reception ==
Oru Viral was released on 17 December 1965. Kalki criticised the film for its story. Despite its low budget and lack of stars, the film was successful.
