= Thedi Vandha Lakshmi =

1973 film by G. R. Nathan

Thedi Vanda Lakshmi
- Theatrical release poster
- Directed by: G. R. Nathan
- Written by: S. V. Jagadeesan
- Produced by: Modern Theatres
- Starring: Jaishankar; Lakshmi
- Cinematography: G. R. Nathan
- Edited by: L. Balu
- Music by: M. S. Sanjay
- Production company: Modern Theatres
- Release date: 24 May 1973
- Running time: 116 minutes
- Country: India
- Language: Tamil

Thedi Vandha Lakshmi (transl. The Lakshmi who was searched for) is a 1973 Indian Tamil-language crime thriller film, directed by G. R. Nathan and produced by Modern Theatres. The film stars Jaishankar and Lakshmi. It was released on 24 May 1973, and performed poorly at the box office.

== Plot ==
Lakshmi's brother Rathnam is murdered and cops interrogate her about ₹2 million (equivalent to ₹77 million or US$800,000 in 2023) which the murdered man had looted. A shocked and dismayed Lakshmi is pounded on one side by the accomplices of Ratnam and on another by the cops pressuring her to return the stolen booty to them. While Lakshmi doesn't know anything about the money, she seeks solace in the arms of Ramesh. The lovers join forces to find the missing stash of cash and prove her innocence.

== Cast ==
- Jaishankar as Inspector Mohan Kumar / Ramesh / Kannan
- Lakshmi as Lakshmi
- R. S. Manohar as Jamboo
- Major Sundarrajan as C.I.D. Chandrasekhar / Raja Pandiyan
- S. V. Ramadoss as Johnny
- Thengai Srinivasan as Kuberan
- Manorama as Geetha
- Vennira Aadai Moorthy as Inspector
- Kannan as Kaali
- A. Sakunthala
- Jayakumari as Pattuma
- 'Baby' Rajee

== Soundtrack ==
The music was composed by M. S. Sanjay, with lyrics by Kannadasan.

| Song | Singers | Length |
|---|---|---|
| "Jilpana Jilpana" | L. R. Eswari | 03:44 |
| "Acham Naanam" | T. M. Soundararajan, P. Susheela | 03:35 |

== Reception ==
Navamani praised the acting, humour and Nathan's direction for maintaining suspense till the end and called it a must watch.
