= Kadhalithal Podhuma =

- Theatrical release poster
- Directed by: K. V. Srinivas
- Written by: M. K. Devarajan; A. L. Narayanan (comedy)
- Produced by: R. Sundaram
- Starring: Jaishankar; Vanisri; R. S. Manohar; Vennira Aadai Nirmala
- Cinematography: C. A. S. Mani
- Edited by: L. Balu
- Music by: Vedha
- Production company: Modern Theatres
- Release date: 1 November 1967
- Running time: 143 minutes
- Country: India
- Language: Tamil

Kadhalithal Podhuma (transl. Is it enough if one only loves?) is a 1967 Indian Tamil-language romance film directed by K. V. Srinivas and produced by under Modern Theatres. The film's script was written by M. K. Devarajan and A. L. Narayanan wrote part of comedy script. The music was by Vedha. It stars Jaishankar, Vanisri, R. S. Manohar and Vennira Aadai Nirmala, with Thengai Srinivasan, V. S. Raghavan Rukmani and B. V. Radha in supporting roles. The film was released on 1 November 1967.

== Plot ==
Ravi is separated from his father Somasundaram, when he is barely three years old. He is reared by a kind widow and grows into a fine young man. He falls in love with Geetha, who reciprocates his love. They get engaged and are to be married soon. However, Mohana, a friend of Ravi's, is in love with him too. She tries to win him over, but Ravi does not harbour any feelings other than friendship for her. Realizing that her attempts are failed, Mohana is about to give up, but she sees a rays of hope, when she meets Thangaraj. Thangaraj is in love with Geetha and therefore he teams up with Mohana and hatches a plan to break the bond between Ravi and Geetha. The plot thickens when Mohana appears on the day of Ravi's wedding and announces that she is already married to him. Ravi denies that, but no one including his mother, believes him. Shattered by this development, Ravi moves in with his friend Mani meanwhile, Mohana makes herself comfortable at Ravi's home. Ravi's mother develops a soft corner for her and reveals to her a secret about Ravi's past. She also says to her that this will help Ravi unite with his parents. Thangaraj learns of this and tries to use this secret to his advantage. Ravi, on the other hand, is trying to prove to Geetha that Mohana's story is false. Do Thangaraj and Mohana succeed in their wicked plans and separate Ravi and Geetha? Does Geetha realise Mohana's true colours and unite with Ravi again?

== Cast ==
- Jaishankar as Ravi
- Vanisri as Mohana
- R. S. Manohar as Thangaraj
- Vennira Aadai Nirmala as Geetha
- Thengai Srinivasan as Mani
- V. S. Raghavan as Somasundaram
- Kumari Rukmani as Ravi's adoptive mother
- R. Pakkirisamy as Ravikumar
- Pushpamala as Manju
- B. V. Radha as Manju's sister

== Production ==
After several action and thriller films, Modern Theatres wanted a film in a different genre, so the romantic Kadhalithal Podhuma was made.

== Soundtrack ==
Music was by Vedha and lyrics were written by Kannadasan. The song "Konjam Nilladi" is based on "Quando quando quando" by Tony Renis. "Kadhal Penne Kanniyar" is based on "O Haseeno Zulfon Wali" from the Hindi film Teesri Manzil.

Song	Singer	Length
"Enthan Nenjam Yaarai"	T. M. Soundararajan, L R Eswari	03:42
"Konjam Nilladi"	T. M. Soundararajan, P. Susheela	03:17
"Kadhal Penne Kanniyar"	T. M. Soundararajan, L. R. Eswari	03:08
"Amma Muzhikkira"	T. M. Soundararajan	04:10
"Kadhal Penne Kanniyar" – 2	T. M. Soundararajan, P. Susheela	04:24

== Release and reception ==
Kadhalithal Podhuma was released on 1 November 1967, and succeeded commercially.
