= Vannakili =

- Theatrical release poster
- Directed by: T. R. Raghunath
- Written by: R. Venkatachalam
- Produced by: T. R. Sundaram
- Starring: Manohar; Prem Nazir; B. S. Saroja; T. R. Ramachandran
- Cinematography: R. Sampath
- Edited by: S. A. Murugesh
- Music by: K. V. Mahadevan
- Production company: Modern Theatres
- Release date: 3 April 1959
- Country: India
- Language: Tamil

Vannakili (transl. Coloured Parrot) is a 1959 Indian Tamil-language film, directed by T. R. Raghunath and produced by T. R. Sundaram of Modern Theatres. The film stars Manohar, Prem Nazir, B. S. Saroja and T. R. Ramachandran. It was released on 3 April 1959, and became a success.

== Plot ==
The village landlord, a widower with a college-educated daughter Saraswathi in love with her father's farmhand Mayan, has an eye on the farmhand's sister, Vannakili. Mayan, however, declines the proposal of the landlord who suggests they could work out an exchange of alliances. Meanwhile, the village macho Poochie falls for Vannakili, kidnaps her and marries her against her wishes. A woman of strong character and old world values, she becomes the obedient wife to her husband who whips her to sing for him. She has a stepdaughter who refuses to acknowledge the new mother. With her good nature, the kind-hearted Vannakili transforms her husband and child, and solves all the problems, leading to her brother marrying the landlord's daughter.

== Cast ==
- Manohar as Poochie
- Prem Nazir as Mayan
- B. S. Saroja as Vannakili
- T. R. Ramachandran as Natarajan
- D. Balasubramaniam as landlord
- R. M. Sethupathi as Karappan
- Mynavathi as Saraswathi
- T. P. Muthulakshmi as Eesal
- S. Rama Rao as Astrologer Subbaiya
- M. Saroja as Village Girl
- C. T. Rajakantham as Guest
- Kallapart T. R. Nadarajan
- C. K. Saraswathi as Natarajan's Mother
- K. K. Soundar as Police Inspector
- M. M. Jayasakthivel
- C. K. Soundirarajan
- Baby Uma as Kungumam

== Soundtrack ==
The music was composed by K. V. Mahadevan. Lyrics were written by A. Maruthakasi.

Song	Singers	Length
"Maattukara Vela"	Seerkazhi Govindarajan	03.21
"Chinna Chinna Pappa"	P. Susheela	04.21
"Aathiley Thanni Vara"	Seerkazhi Govindarajan	04.03
"Saathukkudi Chaaru"	S. C. Krishnan & A. G. Rathnamala	03.12
"Aasai Irukkuthu"	P. Susheela	03.36
"Adikkira Kaithan"	Thiruchi Loganathan & P. Susheela	04.09
"Chithadi Kattikittu"	S. C. Krishnan & P. Susheela	06.07
"Aanandhamaai Ingu"	P. Susheela & Chorus	04.03
"Vandi Urundoda"	Seerkazhi Govindarajan & P. Susheela	04.03
"Kuzhandaiyum Deivamum"	P. Susheela	03.20

== Release ==
Vannakili was released on 3 April 1959, and emerged a success.
