= Vallavanukku Vallavan =

1965 film by R. Sundaram

- Poster
- Directed by: R. Sundaram
- Screenplay by: A. L. Narayanan
- Starring: Gemini Ganesan; Thangavelu; Manohar; Ashokan; Ramadas; Manimala; Manorama
- Cinematography: S. S. Lal
- Edited by: L. Balu
- Music by: Vedha
- Production company: Modern Theatres
- Release date: 28 May 1965
- Running time: 157 minutes
- Country: India
- Language: Tamil

Vallavanukku Vallavan (transl. Expert of all experts) is a 1965 Indian Tamil-language action thriller film, directed by R. Sundaram, son of T. R. Sundaram, and written by A. L. Narayanan. Vedha composed the music. It has an ensemble cast including Gemini Ganesan, Thangavelu, Manohar, Ashokan, Ramadas, Manimala and Manorama. The film was Modern Theatres' 100th film, and is a remake of the 1963 Hindi film Ustadon Ke Ustad.

== Plot ==
Ramesh is an engineer who is hunting for a job and, with the help of his friend Babu, goes to see a wealthy businessman named Laxman for a new project of his. After a song and a comic encounter with Laxman's daughter Geeta, he falls in love with her. He also achieves very good success in convincing Geeta's father into starting the project. During a site visit for the project, his suitcase gets swapped with a similar suitcase of a co-passenger named Mala, which is full of money. For this reason, Ramesh is detained in a police lock-up. Mala is revealed to be part of a criminal gang. When the gang leader, Jumboo, is not able to kill Mala (because he needs a particular diary from her), he instead arranges a dangerous rowdy named Pichua Pakiri to kill Ramesh within the lock-up.

However, instead of killing Ramesh, Pichua decides to hold Ramesh captive. Together they escape the lock-up that very night to prove Ramesh's innocence. Pichua also angers the criminal gang of Mala, when he asks for a greater sum in return for killing Ramesh. When a mysterious man makes phone calls and tries to save Ramesh from captivity, Ramesh escapes by himself out into the city. The mysterious man also attacks Pichua before running away. The criminal gang try to kill Pichua, but he escapes after a fight. Geeta meets him and helps him by giving him a hanky and some milk from her flask.

Ramesh, being chased by the police, Pichua Pakiri and the criminal gang, attempts to fake his death. Geeta, believing his death to be real, comes to the waterfall, where he has supposedly committed suicide and learns that he is not really dead. They both go to one of the villas owned by Geeta's father, and make a secret stay there. Pichua confronts them and threatens to kill Ramesh, but is tamed by the very pleading words of Geeta. He instead promises to help Ramesh out of the situation. Both Pichua and Ramesh don disguises to roam in search of Mala and with her prove his innocence. But, they are chased by police and are led to a comic encounter where they sing a song for a dance by Savitri. Later, Mala and Babu drive a car together and develop romantic feelings for one another. When Ramesh and Pichua get to know this, they try to use their relationship to get the truth out of Mala. But their plan backfires.

After this, the mysterious man (Gemini Ganesan) appears secretly inside Ramesh's car, promising to help him. He admits that he is a police officer when asked, and says he knows that Ramesh is innocent. But leaves when Pichua and Babu enter the car. Men from the criminal gang disguised as policemen "arrest" Ramesh, whom they intend to murder at a safe spot. However, with the help of his friends, Ramesh escapes. Later, the same mysterious man appears once again, and meets Ramesh to tell him that he knows Mala well and also Pichua is planning to give off Ramesh to the criminal gang for money. Ramesh believes him and starts to avoid Pichua, telling him that he now knows his true intentions.

When Mala is forced by Jumboo, the gang leader, to fly abroad, she is confronted by the still mysterious man who forces her to give him the diary, failing which she would end up in jail. But she is shot by a shadowy figure, which is then chased by the mysterious man. But, Pichua gets hold of the diary after coming there. Ramesh learns of the death of Mala and becomes sad. Jumboo arrives there, and Pichua confronts him, now asking for twice the earlier amount for the diary and the life of Ramesh.

Pichua takes Ramesh with him to prove his innocence, after pleading with Ramesh and Geeta for a long time. They arrive at a cave on a hill. There Pichua tries to sell Ramesh and the diary for the agreed sum, apparently betraying Ramesh. The mysterious man arrives at the scene to whom Ramesh explains the situation.

When the mysterious man tries to enact his police disguise there, Pichua reveals he is Mr. Prakash, the true leader of the crime gang, and he himself is Inspector Sekar of Vigilance Branch. With this information, both Prakash and Ramesh are startled. After some talk, an elaborate fight and chase, Mr. Prakash drives a boat that crashes into a rock, killing him. Ramesh is proven innocent through the information in the diary.

Pichua (now Inspector Sekar) attends the wedding of Ramesh and Geeta in full inspector uniform. The film ends with Babu receiving a prize sum from the Police Department for his help in the case.

== Cast ==
- Gemini Ganesan as Prakash
- Thangavelu as Babu
- Manohar as Pichua Pakiri / Inspector Seker
- S. A. Ashokan as Ramesh
- Ramadas as Jambu
- Manimala as Geeta
- Manorama as Mala
- Savitri Ganesan as herself (cameo)
- T. P. Muthulakshmi as announcer

== Production ==
Vallavanukku Vallavan is a remake of the Hindi film Ustadon Ke Ustad, and the 100th production of Modern Theatres. Cinematography was handled by S. D. Lal, who shot the film using an Arriflex 2C. Gemini Ganesan portrayed a negative role, in contrast to the positive roles he was previously known for, while Ashokan was also cast against type by playing a positive character.

== Soundtrack ==
Music was composed by Vedha and lyrics were written by Kannadasan and Panchu Arunachalam. The song "Manam Ennum" is based on "Sau Saal Pehle" from the 1961 Hindi film Jab Pyar Kisi Se Hota Hai, and "Or Aayiram Paarvaiyile" is based on "Sou Bar Janam Lenge" from Ustadon Ke Ustad.

Song	Singer	Lyrics	Length
"Aadaiyai Paaru"	T. M. Soundararajan	Kannadasan	3:40
"Or Aayiram Parvaiyile"	T. M. Soundararajan	Kannadasan	5:48
"Paaradi Kanne"	T. M. Soundararajan, Sirkazhi Govindarajan & P. Suseela	Kannadasan	6:55
"Manam Ennum Medai Mele"	T. M. Soundararajan & P. Suseela	Kannadasan	3:30
"Pozhuthum Vidyum"	P. Suseela	Kannadasan	3:39
"Kaliyile Kaathadichaa"	Sirkazhi Govindarajan	Kannadasan	
"Paal Manakuthu Poo"	Sirkazhi Govindarajan & L. R. Eswari	Kannadasan	3:17
"Kandalum Kanndene"	Sirkazhi Govindarajan & L. R. Eswari	Panchu Arunachalam	4:58

== Reception ==
Kalki negatively reviewed the film. It ran for over 100 days in theatres.
