= Veeranganai =

- Theatrical release poster
- Directed by: A. S. A. Sami
- Starring: Gemini Ganesan; Padmini
- Music by: Vedha
- Production company: Oriental Movies
- Release date: 22 August 1964
- Country: India
- Language: Tamil

Veeranganai (/viːrɑːŋɡəˈnaɪ/ transl. Warrior woman) is a 1964 Indian Tamil-language historical action film directed by A. S. A. Sami. The film stars Gemini Ganesan and Padmini. It was released on 22 August 1964.

== Plot ==
Lakshmi Devi is a princess whose kingdom is threatened by a tyrant from another kingdom.

== Cast ==
- Gemini Ganesan
- Padmini
- Ragini
- Sukumari
- R. S. Manohar
- S. A. Ashokan
- Balaji
- Sathyapal

== Production ==
The female lead character Lakshmi Devi is a fictionalised version of Rani Lakshmi Bai, while the Chinese-looking antagonist is an allusion to the Sino-Indian War.

== Soundtrack ==
The music was composed by Vedha.

Track listing
No.	Title	Lyrics	Singer(s)	Length
1.	"Angamellam Sornthu"	T. K. Sundara Kannan	P. Leela, M. L. Vasanthakumari, K. J. Yesudas
2.	"Arasi Endral Enna"	A. Maruthakasi	Sirkazhi Govindarajan
3.	"Idi Idikkuthu"	Maa. Raa.	K. J. Yesudas
4.	"Malare Malare Mangai"	Kavi Rajagopal	P. Leela
5.	"Naadu Enum Paingiliyai"	Kavi Rajagopal	P. Leela
6.	"Neela Vanna Kangal"	Pakkirisami	P. Susheela, K. J. Yesudas
7.	"Thaaye Thayanidhiye"	T. K. Sundara Vathiyar	P. Leela

== Release and reception ==
Veeranganai was released on 22 August 1964. The Indian Express wrote that the film "really does not lack valour. In fact it has much of it, rather too much, thanks to stock shots and well-taken fencing sequences. Minus these, it is somewhat damp and at time, childish. Nevertheless, in its class, the film is better than many others". Kalki also reviewed the film.
