= Meendum Vazhven =

- Theatrical release poster
- Directed by: T. N. Balu
- Written by: T. N. Balu
- Produced by: V. C. Jain; G. C. Lal Vani
- Starring: Ravichandran; Bharathi; Nagesh; R. S. Manohar; Vijaya Lalitha
- Cinematography: K. S. Prasad
- Edited by: R. Devarajan
- Music by: M. S. Viswanathan
- Production company: Rani Productions
- Release date: 23 April 1971
- Running time: 161 minutes
- Country: India
- Language: Tamil

Meendum Vazhven (transl. I will live once more) is a 1971 Indian Tamil-language thriller film, written and directed by T. N. Balu. The film stars Ravichandran, Bharathi, Nagesh, R. S. Manohar and Vijaya Lalitha playing lead roles, with Major Sundararajan, S. Varalakshmi, Thengai Srinivasan and Master Sekhar playing supporting roles. It was released on 23 April 1971.

== Plot ==
Jagatheesh wants to grab the properties of his businessman paternal uncle, Rajamanickam Pillai, by killing him and his young son Babu, who is studying in a distant boarding school. Knowing his evil intention, the paternal uncle keeps his son's whereabouts a secret which is known only to his loyal personal secretary Shanthi. One night after a bitter argument over the properties, Jagatheesh kills his uncle and abducts his secretary Shanthi to find out about his young son Babu.

Meanwhile, Raju, son of a rich man Chinna Durai is thrown out of his house by his stepmother Shantha Lakshmi and lands in the city as a taxi driver. The secretary Shanthi gets abducted in his taxi, the news is in the newspapers and the police start looking for the taxi. Raju then goes after Jagathesh and finds Shanthi locked up in a cell on a remote island. Jagatheesh finds out the whereabouts of the boy but is unable to identify him, so he abducts a busload of boys from that school and forces Shanthi to identify the boy so that he could kill him. Raju, with help of a small-time magician Chithambaram, rescues Shanthi and the boys after a series of fights with the gangsters. Raju and Shanthi get married.

== Cast ==
- Ravichandran as Raju
- Bharathi as Shanthi
- Nagesh as Chithambaram, Raju's friend/Magician
- R. S. Manohar as Jagadesh, Babu's Paternal Father
- Vijaya Lalitha as Lalitha, Jagatheesh's lover
- Major Sundararajan as Chella Durai, Raju and Rathnam's father
- S. Varalakshmi as Shantha Lakshmi, Rathnam's mother
- Thengai Srinivasan as Black Cat, Jagatheesh's Hitman
- V. Gopalakrishnan as Rathnam, Raju's half brother
- Master Sekhar as Babu
- Samikkannu as Constable Irudhaya Raj
- MCT. Muthaiah
- Singapore Sundaram
- K. S. Angamuthu
- Jayakumari as dumb woman dancer
- Yasotha
- Malathi
- Surekha
- Syamala
- Jai Vijaya

== Soundtrack ==
Music was composed by M. S. Viswanathan, with lyrics by Kannadasan. The song "Velli Muthukal" attained popularity.

Songs	Singer	Length
"Velli Muthukal"	L. R. Eswari S. P. Balasubrahmanyam	04:17
"Valiban Sonna"	L. R. Eswari	04:06
"Thottum Thodathathu"	L. R. Eswari	04:15
"Unna Nenacha Konjam"	L. R. Eswari, A. L. Raghavan	03:59
"Ellarokkum Nalla"	B. Vasantha, L. R. Anjali	03:41
"Vaangayaa Vaanga"	L. R. Eswari, Jikki	04:22
Club Song	Instrumental	
