= Krishnan Vandhaan =

- Theatrical release poster
- Directed by: K. Vijayan
- Written by: L. Dhanraj
- Produced by: Thengai Srinivasan
- Starring: Sivaji Ganesan; K. R. Vijaya; Mohan; Rekha
- Cinematography: G. Or. Nathan
- Edited by: Chezhian
- Music by: Ilaiyaraaja
- Production company: SLS Productions
- Release date: 28 August 1987
- Country: India
- Language: Tamil

Krishnan Vandhaan (transl. Krishnan came) is a 1987 Indian Tamil language comedy drama film, directed by K. Vijayan and produced by Thengai Srinivasan. The film stars Sivaji Ganesan, K. R. Vijaya, Mohan and Rekha. It was released on 28 August 1987, and failed at the box-office.

== Cast ==
- Sivaji Ganesan as Sivaraman
- K. R. Vijaya as Sivagami
- Mohan as Raja
- Rekha as Sumathi
- M. N. Nambiar as Rangarajan
- K. A. Thangavelu as Paramasivam
- Thengai Srinivasan as Krishnan
- Major Sundarrajan in guest appearance
- K.Kannan as Manickam
- C. R. Parthiban as Doctor
- V. K. Ramasamy as Inspector (guest appearance)
- Senthil as Satta Nathan Acting Lawyer Guest Appearance
- S. N. Vasanth as Babu

== Production ==
Krishnan Vandhaan was the first film produced by Thengai Srinivasan.

== Soundtrack ==
The music was composed by Ilaiyaraaja.

Song	Singers	Lyrics	Length
"Thaniyaaga Paduthu"	Ilaiyaraaja, P. Susheela	Mu. Metha	04:33
"Singina Singi"	Malaysia Vasudevan	Gangai Amaran	05:01
"Oru Uravu"	Mano, P. Susheela	Ilaiyaraaja	04:36
"Maadu Izhutha"	Ilaiyaraaja	Ilaiyaraaja	04:47
"Naan Paasamalar"	Malaysia Vasudevan	Gangai Amaran	04:49
"Anne Anne"	Ilaiyaraaja, Mano, P. Susheela	Ilaiyaraaja	04:29

== Reception ==
N. Krishnaswamy of The Indian Express wrote the film "bides to keep audience beguiled" while praising the acting of Ganesan and other actors and also praised Ilaiyaraaja's music and the lyrics, saying they "mesh with the narrative". The film was also reviewed by Jayamanmadhan of Kalki.
