= Anbu Karangal =

1965 film by K. Shankar

- Theatrical release poster
- Directed by: K. Shankar
- Written by: Balamurugan
- Produced by: N. Periannana
- Starring: Sivaji Ganesan; Devika; K. Balaji; Manimala
- Cinematography: Thambu
- Edited by: K. Narayanan
- Music by: R. Sudarsanam
- Production company: Shanthi Films
- Release date: 19 February 1965
- Running time: 140 minutes
- Country: India
- Language: Tamil

Anbu Karangal (transl. Hands of love) is a 1965 Indian Tamil-language drama film, directed by K. Shankar and written by Balamurugan. The film stars Sivaji Ganesan, Devika, Manimala and K. Balaji. It was released on 19 February 1965.

== Cast ==
- Sivaji Ganesan as Sivaraman
- Devika as Annam
- K. Balaji as Kannan
- Manimala as Anandhi
- V. K. Ramasamy as Soodamani
- Nagesh as Thirupathy
- Manorama as Ponnamma
- O. A. K. Thevar
- P. D. Sambandam as Saint
- Seethalakshmi as Gunavathi
- G. Sakunthala as Uma
- Lakshmi Prabha as Lakshmi
- S. D. Subbulakshmi as Nallama
- Baby Shakeela as Kanmani

== Soundtrack ==
The music was composed by R. Sudarsanam, with lyrics by Vaali.

Song	Singers	Length
"Azhakenna Arivenna"	P. Susheela	2:46
"Iravu Mudinthuvidum"	P. Susheela, P. B. Sreenivas	03:54
"Raamanukke Seethai"	P. Susheela	03:15
"Kakithathil Kappal"	T. M. Soundararajan	04:27
"Onna Irukka Kathukkanum"	T. M. Soundararajan	02:57

== Release and reception ==
Anbu Karangal was released on 19 February 1965. A rather unflattering review from The Indian Express noted, "While writer Balamurugan goes on stressing the obvious, director Sankar fills the film with silly symbolisms, meaningless montages and maddening melodrama. The cumulative effect is so pernicious that even the inimitable Sivaji is unable to save the movie." Kalki said the film could be watched for Ganesan's performance and Nagesh's comedy.
