= Kavari Maan =

1979 film by S. P. Muthuraman

- Theatrical release poster
- Directed by: S. P. Muthuraman
- Written by: Panchu Arunachalam
- Produced by: B. H. Rajanna
- Starring: Sivaji Ganesan
- Cinematography: Babu
- Edited by: R. Vittal; T. K. Rajan
- Music by: Ilaiyaraaja
- Production company: Rajanna Enterprises
- Release date: 6 April 1979
- Country: India
- Language: Tamil

Kavari Maan (transl. Musk deer) (Note: The term figuratively means a human who would die if he lost his honour.) is a 1979 Indian Tamil-language crime drama film, directed by S. P. Muthuraman and written by Panchu Arunachalam. The film stars Sivaji Ganesan, with Vijayakumar, Ravichandran, Sekhar and Sridevi in supporting roles. It follows a man who murders his wife for having an extramarital affair, and the effects it has on his relationship with his daughter. The film was released on 6 April 1979.

== Plot ==
Thyagarajan is an IAS officer. After seeing his wife Kalpana in bed with her extramarital lover Anand, he murders her in front of his daughter Uma's eyes. This strains his relationship with his daughter, who remains contemptuous towards him even after he completes his prison term. He however keeps coming behind her as she is the only solace he has in life. His family too has disowned him except for Sivaramakrishnan, his father, who was a judge and has read the character of Thyagarajan, Kalpana and understood what would have happened.

Uma falls in love with Rajesh, a womaniser. In spite of numerous attempts by Thyagarajan, Uma refuses to believe that Rajesh is immoral. On his birthday party, Rajesh attempts to rape her and she kills him. Thyagarajan goes to prison taking the blame and the family which already hated him now refuses to acknowledge him with Uma and Sivaramakrishnan alone, still being with him.

== Cast ==
Male cast

- Sivaji Ganesan as Thyagarajan
- Vijayakumar as Sundarrajan
- Ravichandran as Anand
- Sekhar as Rajesh
- Major Sundarrajan as Rangarajan
- Thengai Srinivasan as Vasu
- Calcutta Viswanathan as Sivaramakrishnan

Female cast

- Sridevi as Uma
- Prameela as Kalpana
- S. Varalakshmi as Rajalakshmi
- Manimala as Leela
- Baby Babitha as young Uma

== Soundtrack ==
The music was composed by Ilaiyaraaja. The Tyagaraja composition "Brova Bharama" features in the film. It is set in the Carnatic raga Bahudari, and the song "Poopole Un" is set in Mayamalavagowla.

Track listing
No.	Title	Lyrics	Singer(s)	Length
1.	"Poopole Un Punnagaiyil"	Panchu Arunachalam	S. P. Balasubrahmanyam	3:32
2.	"Brova Bharama"	Tyagaraja	K. J. Yesudas	4:14
3.	"Sollavayale"	Bharathiyar	S. Varalakshmi	3:44
4.	"Aaduthu Ullam"	Panchu Arunachalam	S. Janaki	4:08
5.	"English Song"		S. P. Balasubrahmanyam	1:32
Total length:				17:10

== Release and reception ==
Kavari Maan was released on 6 April 1979. Though fans were unwilling to accept Ganesan portraying a wife killer, the film emerged a commercial success. Kaushikan of Kalki criticised the story but praised Muthuraman's direction, adding that the deer in the film's title was not leaping, but roaring. Naagai Dharuman of Anna reviewed the film positively, praising the cast performances, Arunachalam's writing and Ilaiyaraaja's music.

== Bibliography ==
- Sundararaman (2007) [2005]. Raga Chintamani: A Guide to Carnatic Ragas Through Tamil Film Music (2nd ed.). Pichhamal Chintamani. OCLC 295034757.
