= Justice Viswanathan =

- Theatrical release poster
- Directed by: G. R. Nathan
- Written by: A. L. Narayanan (dialogues)
- Starring: Ravichandran; Major Sundarrajan; A. Sakunthala; Manimala
- Cinematography: G. R. Nathan
- Edited by: L. Balu
- Music by: Vedha
- Production company: Modern Theatres
- Release date: 12 March 1971
- Running time: 145 minutes
- Country: India
- Language: Tamil

Justice Viswanathan is a 1971 Indian Tamil-language film, directed by G. R. Nathan, starring Ravichandran and Major Sundarrajan. It is a remake of the 1969 Hindi film Do Bhai. The film was released on 12 March 1971.

== Plot ==
Justice Viswanathan is a popular justice who goes on a revenge hunt for the death of Manimaala. The turn of events that follows forms the rest of the story.

== Cast ==
- Ravichandran as Gopinathan
- Major Sundarrajan as Justice Viswanathan
- A. Sakunthala as Sandhya
- Manimala as Kanchana
- Thengai Srinivasan as Kittu
- R. S. Manohar as Kabali
- Manorama as Kanniamma
- S. V. Ramadass
- Vennira Aadai Moorthy
- Siva Sooriyan
- Pakkirisamy
- K. K. Soundar
- Ramanathan
- Baby Sumathi
- 'Baby' Kumudha
- S. N. Parvathy

== Soundtrack ==
The music was composed by Vedha, with lyrics by Kannadasan. The song "Ithu Neerodu" is based on "Is Duniya Mein O Duniyawalo" from Do Bhai (1969).

Track listing
No.	Title	Singer(s)	Length
1.	"Ithu Neerodu"	Sirkazhi Govindarajan
2.	"Atthani Mandapathil"	P. Susheela
3.	"Silai Seiya"	T. M. Soundararajan, P. Susheela
4.	"Kann Vazhiye"	T. M. Soundararajan, P. Susheela
5.	"Thanga Surangam"	T. M. Soundararajan, P. Susheela
6.	"Ada Epdithan"	T. M. Soundararajan, Manorama
