= Kan Thiranthathu =

- Poster
- Directed by: K. V. Srinivasan
- Screenplay by: K. V. Srinivasan
- Produced by: Pattanna
- Starring: S. V. Sahasranamam; Mynavathi; Ramanathan; T. R. Natarajan
- Cinematography: G. Balakrishnan
- Edited by: S. R. Chandrasekaran
- Music by: T. R. Rajagopalan
- Production company: Narayanan Company
- Release date: 31 October 1959
- Running time: 158 minutes
- Country: India
- Language: Tamil

Kan Thiranthathu (transl. The eye opened) is a 1959 Indian Tamil-language film directed by K. V. Srinivasan. The film stars Ramanathan and Mynavathi. It was released on 31 October 1959.

== Plot ==
Pankajam and her son Boopathy come to reside with a Zamindar and eventually take control of the zamin. They chase out the Zamindar's wife Nagammal and son Chandran away. The Zamindar makes a will in the name of his son and gives it to a loyal servant Manickam. The Zamindar soon dies. A motherless boy, Muthu has seen Manickam receiving the will. Muthu tells this to his father Karuppaiah. Boopathy learns about the will and asks Manickam to hand over the will. Manickam gives him a forged copy of the will.

Manickam becomes ill. His daughter Valli gives money to Muthu and asks him to buy medicine from the town. On his way, Muthu spends the money in entertainment. Manickam dies. Muthu realises his folly. His eyes open. He asks for pardon from Valli. Boopathy tries to molest Valli. She and Muthu run away to Chennai. Boopathy sends people to catch them.

On arrival at Chennai, the boy Muthu gets tired. Valli asks him to wait by the roadside and goes to buy something to eat. Rangan is a thief. He has picked someone's purse and, after taking the money, throws away the purse. It lands where Muthu is waiting. The pursuers beat Muthu thinking he is the thief. A fruits vendor, Maruthayi saves Muthu. Valli falls in love with Rangan. Rangan robs an old woman. But realising her plight he regrets. His eyes are opened. Valli is happy with Rangan's realisation.

Boopathy and his men arrive in Chennai. The fruit vendor Maruthayi bundles fruits in the will without knowing it is the genuine copy of the Zamindar's will, and sells the fruits to Boopathy's men. Rangan discovers this and goes to Boopathy's house to retrieve the will. Boopathy learns that Rangan is really the Zamindar's son Chandran. Boopathy tries to catch him, but Rangan escapes. Boopathy gets hold of Muthu and ill-treats him when Muthu refuses to divulge the whereabouts of Rangan. Muthu's father Karuppaiah could not bear his son's suffering and wants to take revenge on Boopathy.

Rangan learns through Boopathy's laundress Sinnayi that Boopathy is ill-treating Muthu. He takes a knife and goes to Boopathy's place to rescue Muthu.

Karuppaiah tries to feed his son. Boopathy sees this and pushes Karuppaiah down to the floor. Karuppaiah sees Rangan's knife and kills Boopathy with it. Muthu escapes from captivity, but he becomes unconscious when he sees his father killing Boopathy. Karuppaiah lifts Muthu and runs away. Rangan arrives and finds Boopathy had been killed with his knife.

Rangan is charged with murder. When the court proceedings were going on, Muthu tries to save Rangan and wants to tell the court it was his father who killed Boopathy. Karuppaiah's eyes are opened. He surrenders to court accepting the guilt.

Rangan and Valli gets married. Rangan, who is now the Zamindar, gives away his wealth to poor people and chooses to live as one of them.

== Cast ==
Male cast

- S. V. Sahasranamam as Karuppaiah
- Master Vyas as Muthu
- Ramanathan as Chandran, Rangan
- T. R. Natarajan as Bhoopathi
- P. S. Venkatachalam as Manikkam
- A. Karunanidhi as Sataiyan
- Friend Ramasami as Sankaran Kutty

Male support cast

- Narayana Pillai, Sayeeram, Balakrishna,
  P. D. Sambandam, T. K. Kalyanam, C. P. Kittan.

Female cast

- Mynavathi as Valli
- N. S. K. Mathuram as Maruthayi
- Suryakala as Ramamani
- C. T. Rajakantham as Pankajam
- S. R. Janaki as Old Woman
- Indira Devi as Chinnayi

Dance

- Sayee–Subbulakshmi

== Production ==
The film was produced by Pattanna under the banner Narayanan Company and was directed by K. V. Srinivasan who also wrote the story and dialogues. G. Balakrishnan was in charge of Cinematography while the editing was done by S. R. Chandrasekaran. Art direction was by A. K. Sekar. Dance sequences were performed by Sayee-Subbulakshmi sisters, choreographed by Muthusamy Pillai and Jayaraman. The film was shot at Narasu studios and processed at Gemini Studios.

== Soundtrack ==
Music was composed by T. R. Rajagopalan.

| Song | Singer/s | Lyricist | Length |
|---|---|---|---|
| "Manushanai Paathittu" | K. Jamuna Rani | Pattukkottai Kalyanasundaram | 04:36 |
| "Oru Kuraiyum Seiyaadhe" | Sirkazhi Govindarajan, S. C. Krishnan, K. Jamuna Rani and group | Pattukkottai Kalyanasundaram | 05:41 |
| "Man Meedhu Paayum Maanadhi Yaavum" | P. Susheela | Hanumantha Rao | 04:42 |
| "En Manam Arivaanodi" | P. Susheela | V. Seetharaman | 03:24 |
| "Panam Kaasu Padaichaale" | P. Susheela & S. Janaki | V. Seetharaman | 03:54 |
| "Pennkalai Kandaale" | Sirkazhi Govindarajan & P. Susheela | V. Seetharaman | 04:30 |
| "Kann Thirandhathu, Oli Pirandhathu" | Sirkazhi Govindarajan, S. C. Krishnan, K. Jamuna Rani, P. Susheela & group | V. Seetharaman | 04:57 |
| "Parandhathe Unmai Parandhathe" | Sirkazhi Govindarajan | V. Seetharaman | 04:40 |
