= Konjum Kumari =

- Theatrical release poster
- Directed by: G. Viswanathan
- Written by: Mana; K. Devarajan (comedy)
- Produced by: T. R. Sundaram
- Starring: K. R. Indira Devi; R. S. Manohar; Manorama
- Cinematography: Melli Irani
- Edited by: L. Balu
- Music by: Vedha
- Production company: Modern Theatres
- Release date: 4 October 1963
- Country: India
- Language: Tamil

Konjum Kumari (transl. Enticing Girl) is 1963 Indian Tamil-language action comedy film, directed by G. Viswanathan and produced by T. R. Sundaram for Modern Theatres. The script was written by Mana and K. Devarajan, with music by Vedha. The film stars K. R. Indira Devi, Manorama and R. S. Manohar, with S. V. Ramadas, A. Karunanidhi and K. K. Soundar in supporting roles.

== Plot ==
Alli (Manorama) is a veritable jungle queen who rescues Rajangam (R. S. Manohar) when a gang of robbers attack him in the forest. She loses her heart to him, but he turns her down. So, the rifle-toting heroine forces him to marry her at gunpoint. When the villain abducts Rajangam's brother for ransom, it's Alli who comes to the rescue again. How this and other events unite the couple forms the rest of the movie.

== Cast ==
Cast according to the opening credits

Male

- Manohar as Rajangam
- Ramadas as Jambulingam
- Mohan as Manickam
- Karunanidhi as Mannaru
- B. Sethupathi
- Pandian
- Azhwar Kuppusami as Sahayam
- K. K. Soundar as Soundar
- Mani
- K. K. Rathnam
- V. P. S. Mani

Female

- Manorama as Alli
- Kumari Rukmani as Kannamma
- K. R. Indira Devi
- Pushpamala as Thangam
- S. Mohana as Prema
- Baby Chandrakala as Meena

Dance

- Sasi-Kala-Mala (Madras Sisters)

== Production ==
Konjum Kumari was the film for Manorama in a leading role. The film was directed by G. Viswanathan and produced by T. R. Sundaram of Modern Theatres. Cinematography was handled by Melli Irani, and editing by L. Balu. While the main story was written by Mana, K. Devarajan wrote the comedy track.

== Soundtrack ==
Music was composed by Vedha.

| Songs | Singers | Lyricist | Length |
|---|---|---|---|
| "Thoppula Oru Naal" | Tiruchi Loganathan, A. G. Rathnamala | Vaali | 03:14 |
| "Aasai Vanthapinne" | K. J. Yesudas, B. Vasantha | Vaali | 03:34 |
| "Jaliyana Jodikala" | P. Susheela | Vaali | 04:57 |
| "Kaathirundhene Naane" | P. Susheela | Vaali | 03:37 |
| "Mappillaiyae Mappillaiye Kovama" | P. Susheela | Karunaidhasan | 03:14 |
| "Nadanthu Kaadu Enakku" | P. Susheela | Nallathambi | 02:45 |
| "Vanakkam Vanakkam" | A. G. Ratnamala and group | Nallathambi | 04:35 |

== Reception ==
First two minutes of the movie offers tribute to T.R. Sundaram, the founder of Modern Theatres, who had died during the production of this movie. A clip of M.G. Ramachandran (MGR) walking in the funeral procession is also included. The film was a modest success, largely due to viewers' reluctance to accept Manorama in a leading role.
