= Thengai Srinivasan =

Indian actor and comedian

- Born: Srinivasan Rajavel Mudaliar; 21 October 1937; Tamil Nadu, Srivaikuntam in Tuticorin District, India
- Died: 9 November 1987 (aged 50); Karnataka, India
- Occupations: Actor, Comedian
- Years active: 1965–1987
- Spouse: Lakshmi (till his death)
- Children: 3
- Relatives: Yogi (grandson); Shrutika (granddaughter); Adithya (grandson)

Srinivasan Rajavel Mudaliar better known as Thengai Srinivasan (21 October 1937 – 9 November 1987) was an Indian actor who appeared in Tamil-language films and plays from the 1960s to the 1980s. He was given the prefix Thengai (coconut) after his role as a coconut-seller in the play Kal Manam. Although originally a comedian, he also performed in other genres and enacted several lead and antagonistic roles.

== Early life ==
Srinivasan was born to Rajavel Mudaliar (Chennai) and Subammal (Srivaikuntam in Tuticorin district) on 21 October 1937. He had two sisters. When he was seven years old, his family moved to Chennai. Srinivasan's father was an artist who staged several plays and it was his influence which stimulated Srinivasan's interest in an acting career.

After school, Srinivasan joined the Integral Coach Factory in Chennai and later started his theatrical career in the Railway Dramatic Club. Srinivasan's first stage appearance was in his father's drama Galatta Kalyanam. Srinivasan was also part of the troupe of K. Kannan and portrayed a coconut vendor in one of his plays Kal Manam. Comedian K. A. Thangavelu upon watching the play, announced he should be called Thengai (coconut) Srinivasan thereafter.

== Career ==
Srinivasan's first feature film was the mystery thriller Oru Viral in 1965. The film, which saw him playing a detective, was a financial success. Srinivasan was, however, supposed to make his feature film debut in Iravum Pagalum (1965) that marked the acting debut of Jaishankar, but was dropped after distributors raised concerns about two newcomers being featured in the lead roles. He and Jaishankar nonetheless would become close friends later and Srinivasan was featured in almost 80 per cent of Jaishankar's early films.

For the most part, Srinivasan enacted the role of a comedian or a sidekick. Notable roles in his subsequent career include that of a fake Swami and that of an idealistic industrialist in the cult comedy films Kasethan Kadavulada and Thillu Mullu, respectively. In 2013, Forbes India included his performance in Thillu Mullu, along with that of Rajinikanth in the same film, in its list of the "25 Greatest Acting Performances of Indian Cinema". Srinivasan also played antagonistic roles; one of which was that of a blackmailing photographer in S. P. Muthuraman's Mayangukiral Oru Maadhu.

He played the lead in Vaali's play Sri Krishna Vijayam, which was later made into a feature film named Kaliyuga Kannan. The makers originally intended to cast Sivaji Ganesan in the role, but Ganesan, being impressed by Srinivasan's performance in the play, suggested that Srinivasan should be retained for the film version. Kaliyuga Kannan went on to become a high commercial success and is considered one of Srinivasan's most notable films. Other films featuring Srinivasan in the lead role were Nandri Karangal, Sri Ramajayam, Porter Ponnusami and Adukku Malli, which was a box office success. In 1987, Srinivasan produced the film Krishnan Vandhaan with Sivaji Ganesan in the lead. The film did not fare well and got him into deep financial trouble.

== Death ==
Srinivasan suffered a brain haemorrhage in Bangalore, Karnataka, where he had gone to attend the final rituals of his aunt. Despite intensive treatment, he died on 9 November 1987. His body was brought to his house at Ramasamy Street in Gopalapuram, Chennai. His death was marked by tributes from film fans and industry insiders alike.

== Personal life ==
Srinivasan was married to Lakshmi. The couple have two daughters – Geethalakshmi and Rajeshwari – and a son, Shivshankar. Geethalakshmi's son Yogi has acted in films such as Azhagiya Asura (2006) and Sivi (2007), and Shivshankar's daughter Shrutika also appeared in a few Tamil films during the 2000s. Shivshankar's son Adithya Shivpink is also an actor, having starred in films featuring Rajinikanth since 2018.

== Filmography ==
This is a partial filmography.

=== 1960s ===
Year	Film	Role	Notes
1965	Oru Viral	CID officer	
1966	Vallavan Oruvan		
1967	Kadhalithal Podhuma		
1967	Raja Veetu Pillai	Singaram	
1967	Sabash Thambi		
1967	Ethirigal Jakkirathai		
1968	Ethir Neechal		
1968	Muthu Chippi		
1968	Oli Vilakku		
1968	Moondrezhuthu		
1968	Kannan En Kadhalan		
1969	Naangu Killadigal		
1969	Nirai Kudam		
1969	Akka Thangai		
1969	Kanne Pappa		
1969	Kuzhandai Ullam		
1969	Sivandha Mann		
1969	Aindhu Laksham		
1969	Nam Naadu	Kuppuswamy	

=== 1970s ===
Year	Film	Role	Notes
1970	Maanavan	Mayandi	
1970	En Annan		
1970	Paadhukaappu		
1970	Engal Thangam	Pidhambar	
1970	Namma Veetu Deivam		
1970	Penn Deivam		
1970	Engirundho Vandhaal		
1970	Enga Mama	Fatafat Sankar	
1970	Anadhai Anandhan		
1970	CID Shankar		
1971	Meendum Vazhven		
1971	Rickshawkaran		
1971	Annai Velankanni		
1971	Uttharavindri Ulle Vaa	Dr. Swaminathan	
1971	Sumathi En Sundari		
1971	Justice Viswanathan		
1971	Then Kinnam		
1971	Neerum Neruppum		
1971	Arunodhayam		
1972	Kasethan Kadavulada	Appaswamy	
1972	Naan Yen Pirandhen		
1972	Velli Vizha		
1972	Mappillai Azhaippu		
1972	Jakkamma		
1972	Karunthel Kannayiram		
1972	Pillaiyo Pillai		
1972	Kadhalikka Vanga		
1972	Nalla Neram		
1972	Pillaiyo Pillai		
1972	Dheivam		
1973	Deivamsam		
1973	Baghdad Perazhagi		
1973	Vakkuruthi		
1973	Pattikaattu Ponnaiya		
1973	Alaigal		
1973	Komatha En Kulamatha		
1973	Kasi Yathirai		
1973	Thedi Vandha Lakshmi		
1973	Ulagam Sutrum Valiban		
1973	Maru Piravi		
1973	Deivakulanthaigal		
1973	School Master		
1973	Pookkari		
1973	Kattila Thottila		
1973	Ponvandu		
1973	Amman Arul		
1973	Manipayal		
1974	Kaliyuga Kannan	Sambu Iyer	
1974	Kai Niraya Kaasu		
1974	Prayaschitham		
1974	Athaiya Mamiya		
1974	Thaai Piranthal		
1974	Roshakari		
1974	Doctoramma		
1974	Naan Avanillai		
1974	Engamma Sapatham		
1974	Panathukkaga		
1974	Vairam		
1974	Sirithu Vazha Vendum		
1974	Netru Indru Naalai	Dayalan	
1974	Ungal Viruppam		
1974	Avalum Penn Thaane		
1974	Ippadiyum Oru Penn		
1975	Pallandu Vazhga		
1975	Idhayakkani		
1975	Pattikkaattu Raja	'Meyvakku' Meganathan	
1975	Ninaithadhai Mudippavan		
1975	Thangathile Vairam		
1975	Thiruvarul		
1975	Enga Pattan Sothu		
1975	Andharangam		
1975	Uravukku Kai Koduppom		
1975	Karotti Kannan		
1975	Mayangukiral Oru Maadhu		
1975	Aayirathil Oruthi	Kabalishwaran	
1976	Ore Thanthai		
1976	Annakili		
1976	Mayor Meenakshi		
1976	Akka		
1976	Uzhaikkum Karangal		
1976	Dasavatharam		
1976	Athirshtam Azhaikkirathu		
1976	Kumara Vijayam		
1976	Nee Oru Maharani		
1976	Kaalangalil Aval Vasantham		
1976	Muthana Muthallavo		
1976	Mayor Meenakshi		
1976	Bhadrakali		
1976	Needhikku Thalaivanangu		
1976	Lalitha		
1977	Aattukara Alamelu		
1977	Aasai Manaivi		
1977	Uyarndhavargal		
1977	Indru Pol Endrum Vaazhga		
1977	Olimayamana Ethirkalam		
1977	Meenava Nanban		
1977	Penn Jenmam		
1977	Chakravarthy		
1977	Murugan Adimai		
1977	Avar Enakke Sontham		
1977	Navarathinam		
1977	Aadu Puli Attam		
1977	Palabishegham		
1978	Madhuraiyai Meetta Sundharapandiyan		
1978	Vaazha Ninaiththaal Vaazhalaam		
1978	Shri Kanchi Kamakshi	Devotee	
1978	Thyagam		
1978	General Chakravarthi		
1978	Varuvan Vadivelan		
1978	Oru Nadigai Natakam Parkiral		
1978	Vaazhkai Alaigal		
1978	Andaman Kadhali		
1978	Sadhurangam		
1978	Ullathil Kuzhanthaiyadi		
1978	Rudhra Thaandavam		
1978	Thanga Rangan		
1978	Vattathukkul Chaduram		
1978	Pilot Premnath		
1978	Sakka Podu Podu Raja		
1978	Vanakkatukuriya Kathaliye		
1978	Justice Gopinath	Bhadrachalam	
1978	Sonnadhu Nee Thanaa		
1978	Priya		Simultaneously shot in Kannada
1978	Kaatrinile Varum Geetham		
1979	Annai Oru Aalayam	Gopalsamy	
1979	Dharma Yuddham	Robert	
1979	Anbae Sangeetha		
1979	Thaayillamal Naan Illai		
1979	Kavari Maan	Vasu	
1979	Kalyanaraman	Kittu	
1979	Porter Ponnusami		
1979	Thirisoolam		
1979	Nallathoru Kudumbam		
1979	Naan Vazhavaippen		
1979	Pattakkathi Bhairavan		
1979	Imayam		
1979	Vetrikku Oruvan		
1979	Gnana Kuzhandhai		
1979	Sri Ramajayam		
1979	Aarilirindhu Aruvathu Varai		
1979	Neela Malargal	Kathavarayan Pillai	

=== 1980s ===
Year	Film	Role	Notes
1980	Billa	J.J	
1980	Anbukku Naan Adimai		
1980	Soolam		
1980	Rishi Moolam		
1980	Ratha Paasam		
1980	Vishwaroopam		
1980	Dharma Raja		
1980	Jamboo		
1980	Yamanukku Yaman	Chitragupta	
1980	Devi Dharisanam		
1980	Avan Aval Adhu		
1980	Maria My Darling		
1980	Varumayin Niram Sivappu	Rangan	
1981	Thee		
1981	Meendum Kokila	Nattuvanar	
1981	Ram Lakshman		
1981	Ellam Inba Mayyam		
1981	Bala Nagamma		
1981	Savaal		
1981	Dhairya Lakshmi		Kannada film
1981	Kadal Meengal		
1981	Garjanai		
1981	Kalthoon		
1981	Kazhugu		
1981	Thillu Mullu	Sri Ramachandramurthy	
1981	Tik Tik Tik	Lakshmi Narayanan	
1981	Ellam Inba Mayyam		
1982	Auto Raja		
1982	Azhagiya Kanne		
1982	Ranga		
1982	Kanne Radha		
1982	Oorukku Oru Pillai		
1982	Pudukavithai		
1982	Nandri, Meendum Varuga		
1982	Adhisayappiravigal		
1982	Oorum Uravum		
1982	Vasandhathil Or Naal		
1982	Mul Illatha Roja		
1982	Paritchaikku Neramaachu		
1982	Thaai Mookaambikai		
1982	Sakalakala Vallavan	Sundaram	
1982	Rani Theni	Thulasilingum	
1982	Nenjangal		
1982	Moondru Mugam	Ramanathan	
1983	Saranalayam		
1983	Thai Veedu	Nagalingam	
1983	Miruthanga Chakravarthi		
1983	Indru Nee Nalai Naan		
1983	Sivappu Sooriyan		
1983	Apoorva Sahodarigal		
1983	Thanga Magan		
1983	Villiyanur Matha	Inspector Dheenadayalan	
1984	Nooravathu Naal		
1984	Nalla Naal		
1984	Thiruppam		
1984	Komberi Mookan		
1984	Chiranjeevi		
1984	Alaya Deepam		
1984	Vaazhkai		
1984	Kai Kodukkum Kai		
1984	Osai		
1984	Neengal Kettavai		
1984	Ezhuthatha Sattangal		
1984	Ninaivugal		
1984	Kuva Kuva Vaathugal		
1984	Sarithira Nayagan		
1985	Chain Jayapal		
1985	Kaakki Sattai		
1985	Arthamulla Aasaigal		
1985	Udaya Geetham		
1985	Deivapiravi		
1985	Aduthathu Albert		
1985	Thendrale Ennai Thodu		
1985	Andha Oru Nimidam		
1985	Unnai Thedi Varuven		
1985	Anthasthu		
1985	Sri Raghavendrar		
1985	Padikkadavan		
1985	Pillai Nila		
1985	Chain Jayapal		
1986	Yaaro Ezhuthiya Kavithai		
1986	Naan Adimai Illai		
1986	Viduthalai		
1986	Mandhira Punnagai		
1986	Oomai Vizhigal		
1986	Mel Maruvathoor Arpudhangal		
1986	Kulirkaala Megangal		
1986	Kodai Mazhai		
1986	Anandha Kanneer		
1986	Dharma Devathai		
1986	Maaveeran	Drama head	Guest Appearance
1987	Paruva Ragam		
1987	Rettai Vaal Kuruvi		
1987	Muthukkal Moondru		
1987	Krishnan Vandhaan		

== Bibliography ==
- Ramachandran, Naman (2014) [2012]. Rajinikanth: The Definitive Biography. New Delhi: Penguin Books. ISBN 978-81-8475-796-5.
