= Chain Jayapal =

- VCD cover
- Directed by: Rama Narayanan
- Written by: Rama Narayanan; K. Dinakar (dialogues)
- Produced by: K. G. Balakrishnan
- Starring: Rajesh
- Cinematography: N. K. Viswanathan
- Edited by: K. Gauthaman
- Music by: Shankar–Ganesh
- Production company: Bhaskar Art Movies
- Release date: 22 February 1985
- Country: India
- Language: Tamil

Chain Jayapal is a 1985 Indian Tamil-language action film directed by Rama Narayanan. The film stars Rajesh, Radha Ravi, Rajeev and Rajkumar Sethupathi. It was released on 22 February 1985, and did not perform well at the box office.

== Cast ==
- Rajesh
- Radha Ravi
- Rajeev
- Rajkumar Sethupathi
- Sathyaraj
- Thengai Srinivasan
- S. S. Chandran
- V. Gopalakrishnan
- Ilavarasi
- Vanitha Krishnachandran
- Anuradha
- Sadhana
- Bhagyalakshmi

== Production ==
The film's title was derived from a character played by T. Rajendar in Uyirullavarai Usha.

== Soundtrack ==
The music was composed by Shankar–Ganesh.

Track listing
No.	Title	Lyrics	Singer(s)	Length
1.	"Kaveri Meen Vazhi"	Na. Kamarasan	P. Jayachandran, Vani Jairam
2.	"Raavu Neram"	Poonguyilan	Vani Jairam
3.	"Thazham Poovinile"	Idhayachandran	Malaysia Vasudevan, S. P. Sailaja
4.	"Thazham Poove"	Poonguyilan	P. Jayachandran
