= Iru Vallavargal =

- Poster
- Directed by: K. V. Srinivasan
- Screenplay by: K. Devarajan
- Produced by: R. Sundaram
- Starring: Jaishankar; R. S. Manohar
- Cinematography: S. S. Laal
- Edited by: L. Balu
- Music by: Vedha
- Production company: Modern Theatres
- Release date: 25 February 1966
- Running time: 156 minutes
- Country: India
- Language: Tamil

Iru Vallavargal (transl. Two Mighty Men) is a 1966 Indian Tamil-language action thriller film, directed by K. V. Srinivasan, produced by Modern Theatres and written by K. Devarajan. The film stars Jaishankar and R. S. Manohar, with L. Vijayalakshmi, S. A. Ashokan, C. Vasantha, Thangavelu and Manorama in supporting roles. It is a remake of the 1959 Hindi film Do Ustad. The film was released on 25 February 1966.

== Cast ==
- Jaishankar as Rajan
- R. S. Manohar as Mohan
- L. Vijayalakshmi as Rani
- K. A. Thangavelu as Rao Bagadur
- S. A. Ashokan as Sundaramoorthy
- C. Vasantha as Parvathy
- Manorama as Rupa
- A. Karunanidhi as Vairamani
- Baby Shakeela as Kumaran

== Soundtrack ==
Music was composed by Vedha and lyrics were written by Kannadasan.

Songs	Singer	Length
"Naan Malarodu"	T. M. Soundararajan, P. Susheela	3:30
"Aasaiya Kobama" (Un Pazhakathin)	T. M. Soundararajan, P. Susheela	3:34
"Kaveri Karaiyin"	P. Susheela & chorus	3:24
"Angey Yen Indha"	L. R. Eswari	3:15
"Kadhal Undagum"	L. R. Eswari, Sirkazhi Govindarajan	3:32
"Anubavi Jora Anubavi"	T. M. Soundararajan, L. R. Eswari	3:15
"Kuva Kuva Pappa"	M. S. Rajeswari	3:40
"Uravirundhal Pirivirukkum"	Sirkazhi Govindarajan	1:05

== Reception ==
T. M. Ramachandran of Sport and Pastime called the film "mediocre". Kalki also gave a negative review.
