= Enga Mama =

1970 film by A. C. Tirulokchandar

- Theatrical release poster
- Directed by: A. C. Tirulokchandar
- Screenplay by: V. C. Guhanathan
- Based on: Brahmachari by Sachin Bhowmick
- Produced by: P.K.V.Sankaran; Aarumugam
- Starring: Sivaji Ganesan; Jayalalithaa; Vennira Aadai Nirmala
- Cinematography: S. Maruthi Rao
- Edited by: R. G. Gopi
- Music by: M. S. Viswanathan
- Production company: Jayaar Movies
- Release date: 14 January 1970
- Country: India
- Language: Tamil

Enga Mama (transl. Our Uncle) is a 1970 Indian Tamil-language film, directed by A. C. Tirulokchandar and written by V. C. Guhanathan. The film stars Sivaji Ganesan, Jayalalithaa and Vennira Aadai Nirmala. It is a remake of the 1968 Hindi film Brahmachari. The film was released on 14 January 1970 and became a commercial success.

== Premise ==
Abandoned as a child, Koteeswaran lives in a mortgaged house with 12 young orphans. Things take a turn when he saves a young woman from dying.

== Cast ==
- Sivaji Ganesan as Koteeswaran
- Jayalalithaa as Seetha
- Vennira Aadai Nirmala as Neela
- K. Balaji as Muralikrishnan
- V. K. Ramasamy as Chettiyar
- Cho as Gnanam
- Thengai Srinivasan as Fatafat Sankar
- Rama Prabha as Vadivu
- Typist Gopu as Koteeswaran's hostel warden
- A. Karunanidhi as Sudden Break Shanmugam
- S. N. Lakshmi as Muralikrishnan's mother
- C. K. Saraswathi as Seetha's aunt
- O. A. K. Thevar as Seetha uncle
- Senthamarai as Babu
- Oru Viral Krishna Rao as Police Constable
- Isari Velan as Shopkeeper
- Harikrishnan as Gopal
- S. N. Parvathi as Gopal's wife
- K. R. Indira Devi as Koteeswaran's duplicate lover
- Master Prabhakar as Aasath
- Master Sekhar as Gandhi
- Roja Ramani as Sarojini
- Baby Sumathi as Anni Pesant
- Comedy Shanmugam as Kathiresan

== Soundtrack ==
The music was composed by M. S. Viswanathan, with Kannadasan writing lyrics for all but one song, which was written by Vaali.

Song	Singers	Lyrics	Length
"Naan Thannanthani"	T. M. Soundararajan	Vaali	04:16
"Sorgam Pakkathil"	T. M. Soundararajan, L. R. Eswari	Kannadasan	04:25
"Chellakkiligalam Palliley"	T. M. Soundararajan	Kannadasan	04:00
"Chellakkiligalam Palliley" (Sad)	T. M. Soundararajan	Kannadasan	01:00
"Paavai Paavai Aasai"	P. Susheela	Kannadasan	03:48
"Ennanga Sollunga"	T. M. Soundararajan, P. Susheela	Kannadasan	04:08
"Ellorum Nalam Vaazha"	T. M. Soundararajan	Kannadasan	04:38

== Release ==
Enga Mama was released on 14 January 1970. The film was a commercial success, running for over 100 days in theatres.
