= Chitrangi =

1964 film

- Film poster
- Directed by: R. S. Mani
- Produced by: T. R. Sundaram
- Starring: A. V. M. Rajan; Pushpalatha; Sheela
- Cinematography: C. A. S. Mani
- Edited by: L. Balu
- Music by: Vedha
- Production company: Modern Theatres
- Release date: 1964
- Running time: 147 minutes
- Country: India
- Language: Tamil

Chitrangi is a 1964 Indian Tamil-language film, directed by R. S. Mani and produced by T. R. Sundaram of Modern Theatres. The film stars A. V. M. Rajan, Pushpalatha and Sheela. The soundtrack was composed by Vedha, while the lyrics were written by K. M. Balasubramaniam and Vaali.

== Plot ==
A young woman saves a man from danger, unaware he is a king's brother, and they decide to get married. But she gets the shock of her life when he leaves her on their wedding night.

== Cast ==
- A. V. M. Rajan
- Pushpalatha
- Sheela
- R. S. Manohar
- A. Karunanidhi
- Kumari Rukmini
- S. V. Ramadas
- Kumari Padmini
- Pushpamala

== Soundtrack ==
The music was composed by Vedha. Lyrics were written by and . One song "Pozhudhu Pularnddhadhu Poo Pole", sung by P. Susheela was composed by K. V. Mahadevan. The song "Velodu Vilaiyaadum Murugaiyaa" is set to the Carnatic raga Abheri.

Song	Singers	Lyrics	Length (m:ss)
"Nenjinile Ninaivu Mugam"	T. M. Soundararajan, P. Susheela & K. Jamuna Rani	Ku. Ma. Balasubramaniam	04:26
"Indru Vandha Sondhama"	T. M. Soundararajan & P. Susheela	Ku. Ma. Balasubramaniam	03:36
"Velodu Vilaiyaadum Murugaiyaa"	P. Susheela	Ku. Ma. Balasubramaniam	02:42
"Anna Nadai Chinna Idai Eppadi"	K. Jamuna Rani	Vaali	03:24
"Oyyaari Baamaa Unakkaaga Vaammaa"	S. V. Ponnusamy & A. G. Rathnamala	Vaali	03:54
"Roja Poo Kannaththile Then Paayum"	K. Jamuna Rani	Vaali	03:17
"Unakku Onnu Enakku Onnu Irukkudhu Manasu"	Thiruchi Loganathan & A. G. Rathnamala	Vaali	03:32
"Pozhudhu Pularnddhadhu Poo Pole"	P. Susheela	Kannadasan	03:30

== Reception ==
Film historian Randor Guy noted that, despite the "fast-paced storytelling" and the fact that the film was "sharply edited", it was not a box office success.
