= Vedha (composer) =

Indian composer

Vedha (S. S. Vedhachalam) was an Indian composer who started working in Sinhala films during the early 1950s when they were being produced in Madras. He later worked mainly in Tamil films. He was active in the field for about 25 years from 1952 onwards.

He composed music for many films produced by Modern Theatres. He was popularly known to adapt Hindi tunes to Tamil songs.

== Career ==
He started his career by assisting music directors in films. He was a co-music director in the 1955 film Menaka along with T. G. Lingappa and C. N. Pandurangan.

The first film he was in-charge of as music director is Marma Veeran released in 1956. The song Thudikkum Vaalibame sung by R. Balasaraswathi Devi in this film was a big hit. Usually R. Balasaraswathi was known for singing lullaby songs but this song is full of romantic love known as Sringaram.

Nadakkaadhu Jambam Palikkadhu a song sung by T. M. Soundararajan and Jamunarani in the 1958 film Manamalai was a popular number in Radio Ceylon for a long time.

He composed music for another film in the same year. Anbu Enge was a successful film, music being one of the factors. Particularly, the number Dingiri Dingale sung by T. M. Soundararajan and P. Susheela separately as two versions, was a mega hit. The tune is of Baila genre.

The song "Oraayiram Paarvaiyile" from the 1965 film Vallavanukku Vallavan was also a very popular number. Though the tune was lifted from Hindi, the lyrics by Kannadasan and the mesmerising voice of T. M. Soundararajan gave it a Tamil flavour.

A song from the 1966 film Vallavan Oruvan, "Palinginaal Oru Maaligai" was an apt number for L. R. Eswari's singing talent. Her voice combined with Vedha's music took audience to great heights.

== Singers ==
The singers who sang for his composition are: T. M. Soundararajan, A. M. Rajah, Thiruchi Loganathan, K. J. Yesudas, T. A. Mothi, S. C. Krishnan, J. P. Chandrababu, Sirkazhi Govindarajan, V. N. Sundaram, A. L. Raghavan, S. V. Ponnusamy, Ghantasala, Mohideen Baig, Eddie Jayamanne, P. Susheela, L. R. Eswari, R. Balasaraswathi Devi, K. Jamuna Rani, (Radha) Jayalakshmi, P. Leela, Jikki, K. Rani, A. G. Rathnamala, B. Vasantha, M. S. Rajeswari, Mabel Blythe, Rukmani Devi and Manorama.

== Lyricists ==
Lyricists who wrote lyrics for Vedha's compositions include Kannadasan, Sundar Kannan, A. L. Narayanan, Thanjai N. Ramaiah Dass, Villiputhan, A. Maruthakasi, Vaali, Karunaidasan, Nallathambi, Alangudi Somu and Panju Arunachalam.

== Filmography ==
| Year | Film | Language | Director | Production company |
|---|---|---|---|---|
| 1952 | Umathu Vishvasaya | Sinhala | B. A. W. Jayamanne | Ceylon Theatres |
| 1953 | Kele Handa | Sinhala | B. A. W. Jayamanne | Ceylon Theatres |
| 1954 | Irangini | Sinhala | B. A. W. Jayamanne | Ceylon Theatres |
| 1955 | Menaka | Tamil | V. C. Subburaman | Kasturi Films |
| 1956 | Dingiri Menika | Sinhala | A. S. A. Sami | Heladiva Film Arts |
| 1956 | Marma Veeran | Tamil | T. R. Raghunath | Jubilee Arts |
| 1957 | Jeevitha Satana | Sinhala | Shanthi Kumar | Ceylon Theatres |
| 1958 | Anbu Enge | Tamil | D. Yoganand | Jubilee Arts |
| 1958 | Manamalai | Tamil | Ch. Narayanamurthi | Janatha Pictures |
| 1959 | Minnal Veeran | Tamil | Jampanna | TNR Productions |
| 1960 | Parthiban Kanavu | Tamil | D. Yoganand | Jubilee Films |
| 1962 | Kannadi Maaligai | Tamil | N. N. C. Sami | Rani Pictures |
| 1963 | Alapiranthavan | Tamil | Nanabhai Bhatt | |
| 1963 | Konjum Kumari | Tamil | G. Viswanathan | Modern Theatres |
| 1963 | Pen Manam | Tamil | K. Somu | Mokeshvar Chitra |
| 1964 | Amma Engey | Tamil | G. Viswanathan | Modern Theatres |
| 1964 | Chitrangi | Tamil | R. S. Mani | Modern Theatres |
| 1964 | Pasamum Nesamum | Tamil | D. Yoganand | Alankar Pictures |
| 1964 | Veeranganai | Tamil | A. S. A. Sami | Oriental Pictures |
| 1965 | Sarasa B. A. | Tamil | D. Yoganand | Ganesh Films |
| 1965 | Oru Viral | Tamil | C. M. V. Raman | Salvandar Fernandez |
| 1965 | Vallavanukku Vallavan | Tamil | T. R. Sundaram | Modern Theatres |
| 1966 | Aame Evaru? | Telugu | B. S. Narayana | P. S. V. Pictures |
| 1966 | Iru Vallavargal | Tamil | K. V. Srinivasan | Modern Theatres |
| 1966 | Monagallaku Monagadu | Telugu | S. D. Lal | Modern Theatres |
| 1966 | Vallavan Oruvan | Tamil | T. R. Sundaram | Modern Theatres |
| 1966 | Yaar Nee? | Tamil | Satyam | P. S. V. Pictures |
| 1967 | Adhey Kangal | Tamil | A. C. Tirulokchandar | AVM Productions |
| 1967 | Ave Kallu | Telugu | A. C. Tirulokchandar | AVM Productions |
| 1967 | Ethirigal Jakkirathai | Tamil | T. R. Sundaram | Modern Theatres |
| 1967 | Kadhalithal Podhuma | Tamil | K. V. Srinivasan | Modern Theatres |
| 1968 | Evaru Monagadu | Telugu | T. R. Sundaram | Modern Theatres |
| 1969 | Naangu Killadigal | Tamil | L. Balu | Modern Theatres |
| 1969 | Manasatchi | Tamil | T. N. Balu | Vijaya Balaji Movies |
| 1969 | Ulagam Ivvalavudhan | Tamil | Vedantam Raghavayya | Pandi Amman Movies |
| 1969 | Ponnu Mappillai | Tamil | S. Ramanathan | P. S. V. Pictures |
| 1969 | Rajya Kanksha | Telugu | G. Viswanathan | Bharadwaja Films |
| 1970 | CID Shankar | Tamil | T. R. Sundaram | Modern Theatres |
| 1971 | Justice Viswanathan | Tamil | G. R. Nathan | Modern Theatres |
| 1971 | Nenu Manishine | Telugu | G. V. R. Seshagiri Rao | Modern Theatres |
