= Pasamum Nesamum =

- Theatrical release poster
- Directed by: D. Yoganand
- Screenplay by: Makkalanban
- Based on: Anari by Inder Raj Anand
- Produced by: V. M. Sundar
- Starring: Gemini Ganesan; B. Saroja Devi
- Music by: Vedha
- Production company: Alankar Pictures
- Release date: 26 January 1964
- Country: India
- Language: Tamil

Pasamum Nesamum (/pɑːsəmum neɪsəmum/ transl. Love and Affection) is a 1964 Indian Tamil-language film directed by D. Yoganand. It stars Gemini Ganesan and B. Saroja Devi. It is a remake of the Hindi film Anari (1959). It was released on 26 January 1964.

== Cast ==
This list was adapted from the book Thiraikalanjiyam.

Male cast

- Gemini Ganesan
- M. R. Radha
- K. D. Santhanam
- Nagesh Guest
- Vijayan
- Eswar
- Mahalingam
- Balakrishnan

Female cast

- B. Saroja Devi
- M. V. Rajamma
- Chandrakantha
- Sasikala
- Jyothi
- Nalini
- Revathi
- Vimala

== Production ==
The film was produced by V. M. Sundar under the banner Alankar Pictures and was directed by D. Yoganand. The screenplay was written by Makkalanban.

== Soundtrack ==
Music was composed by Vedha and the lyrics were penned by Kannadasan.

| Song | Singer/s | Duration |
|---|---|---|
| "Kanniyargal Koottam, Kattazhagu Thottam" | P. Susheela & group | 03:38 |
| "Theriyuma, Theriyuma Punnagai Seydhathen" | A. M. Rajah | 04:38 |
| "Velalavu Kangal, Kaalalavu Koondhal" | P. Susheela | 04:57 |
| "Po, Po, Po Enge Thaan Povaai" | P. Susheela | 04:04 |
| "Varuvaano Illaiyo" | P. B. Sreenivas & K. Jamuna Rani & group | 04:39 |
| "Paarthaai, Paarthen" | A. M. Rajah & P. Susheela | 05:00 |
| "Ellaam Naadaga Medai" | P. B. Sreenivas | 04:56 |
| "Unnai Paarththadhu Ange" | P. B. Sreenivas | |

== Reception ==
Kanthan of Kalki gave the film a negative review, comparing it unfavourably to Anari.
