= Panakkara Kudumbam =

1964 film

- Theatrical release poster
- Directed by: T. R. Ramanna
- Written by: Sakthi T. K. Krishnasamy
- Produced by: T. R. Ramanna
- Starring: M. G. Ramachandran; B. Saroja Devi
- Cinematography: M. A. Rahman
- Edited by: M. S. Mani; P. L. Mani
- Music by: Viswanathan–Ramamoorthy
- Production company: RR Pictures
- Release date: 24 April 1964
- Country: India
- Language: Tamil

Panakkara Kudumbam (transl. Rich Family) is a 1964 Indian Tamil-language film starring M. G. Ramachandran. The film was released on 24 April 1964, and ran for more than 150 days in theatres. The film was remade in Hindi in 1970 as Humjoli, in Kannada in 1978 as Bhale Huduga, and in Telugu in 1984 as Intiguttu. All versions except Intiguttu were directed by the same director, T. R. Ramanna.

== Plot ==
Muthaiya and Velaayi are lovers. However, Muthaiya marries the daughter of a rich, ailing man. Since the rich man's daughter rejected him on the wedding day, Muthaiya eyes a second wife, transferring the wealth, to Chennai, for treating his father-in law. The rich man dies, after one year. Muthiah's wife gave birth to a girl, named Rani. Muthiah harasses his wife consistently, due to the wealth inherited, by his wife. Velaayi, manages to know Muthaiya's address in Chennai, from his uncle. Providing a letter to Muthaiya, which invited his wife. Muthaiya plans a plot with intentions to murder, his wife; excusing himself to a visit in the temple, instead delivering a letter to Velaayi.

While travelling towards the temple via a boat, the boat is capsized with the help of Velaayi, as a part of Muthiah's plan. Muthiah manages to save himself and his daughter. He secretly sends money to look after his daughter, marrying Velaayi. As years pass by, Muthaiya visits Rani, his daughter, without Velaayi's knowledge. Rani and Sivagami, study in the same college. One day, Thambi a.k.a. Nalla Thambi visits his sister, Sivagami, in her hostel. Both the siblings including Rani, get acquainted. Rani and Sivagami, finish their studies, returning to their respective villages.

Thambi and Sivagami were driven out of their house, since, both of them oppose their father to get married the second time. Rani joins as a secretary, in Muthaiya's office, without revealing to anyone that she is Muthaiya's daughter, of her first wife. While Thambi gets acquainted, to Raman, while looking for a job in the city. Thambi and Sivagami, move to Raman's house; asking for a portion of the rental, since, Thambi can not find a place for living. Raman's father, Balaraman, and Raman's grandfather, Parasuraman, likes Thambi's attitude, agreeing on his rental. Thambi manages to get a job, from Muthaiya's company, due to recommendations from Rani. Sivagami and Thambi, throw out a party to Rani. However, Kannaiyah, Velaayi's brother, and Muthaiya's brother-in-law, arrives there, leading to a dispute with Thambi. Muthaiya learns of this, giving a friendly warning to Thambi and Rani. Meanwhile, Raman falls in love with Sivagami, get married, while getting clerked as an operator, at Muthaiya's office. Rani, too, falls in love, with Thambi. Kannaiyah, alerted by this, pressured Muthaiya to dismiss Thambi. However, Rani's intervention helped Muthiah to accept Thambi. Kannaiyah grudges against Thambi, vengefully waiting for his turn.

Kannaiyah eventually follows Rani, finding out Muthaiya is Rani's real father, thus, revealing to Velaayi. Muthaiya persuades Rani, to marry Kannaiyah, ending up rejected. Muthaiya, then meets Thambi, showing Rani as his own daughter; persuading Thambi, to reject Rani. Thambi reluctantly nods in an agreement to cast certain aspersions, as a drama, to cheat Rani. Rani mistakenly believes this, reaching to Velayi. Muthaiya's health considerably deteriorates, allowing Kannaiyah to lead the office. Thambi and Kannaiyah, hold up a petty dispute, resulting in Thambi's resignation from the office. Velaayi prepares for engagement, between Rani and Kannaiyah. Thambi attends the engagement, visiting Muthaiya; his honesty exposes the plot to Rani. Cancelling the engagement. Velaayi and Kannaiyah, try to blackmail with the letter, which Muthaiya wrote, before the capsize of the boat. However, Muthaiya showed no concerns, preparing to face the consequences. This results in a report, to the enforcement officials about Muthiah's letter. However, after a series of events, it was acknowledged that his first wife, is still alive. Rani's caretaker, read the news that Muthaiya is arrested. Kannaiyah telephones this matter to Velaayi, planning to kill Muthaiya's first wife. Raman (as an operator of the office) spies this, informing Thambi and Rani.

Thambi rushes to save Rani's mother. During the fight, both Velaayi and Kannaiyah are killed. Rani and Thambi, get united once again.

== Cast ==
- M. G. Ramachandran as Nalla Thambi
- B. Saroja Devi as Rani
- Nagesh as Raman, Parasuraman, Balaraman
- Manimala as Sivagami
- S. A. Ashokan as Muthaiya, Rani 's father
- R. S. Manohar as Kannaiya, Velayee brother. Rani 's uncle
- A. K. Veerasamy as Muthaiya's father in law
- Karikol Raju
- G. Sakunthala as Velayee
- Madhavi as Lily
- Sedhupathy as the father of Thambi and Sivagami

== Soundtrack ==
The soundtrack was composed by Viswanathan–Ramamoorthy, with lyrics by Kannadasan.

Track listing
No.	Title	Singer(s)	Length
1.	"Athai Magal"	P. Susheela	3:39
2.	"Ithuvarai Neengal"	T. M. Soundararajan, P. Susheela	5:06
3.	"Ondru Engal"	T. M. Soundararajan, L. R. Eswari	4:26
4.	"Pallakku Vanga"	T. M. Soundararajan	4:31
5.	"Parakkum Panthu"	T. M. Soundararajan, P. Susheela	4:20
6.	"Vaadiamma Vaadi"	L. R. Eswari, P. Susheela, L. R. Anjali	5:05
7.	"Athai Magal Rathinathai"	T. M. Soundararajan
8.	"Unnai Nambinal"	P. Susheela

== Reception ==
T. M. Ramachandran in Sport and Pastime wrote, "While the somewhat breezy sequences of the film find favour with a large section of the public, it is not wanting in subtly-directed scenes. Ramanna, [...] has produced and directed this film with cleverness". Kanthan of Kalki praised Ramanna's direction and handling of the story, except for the courtroom scenes.
