= CID Shankar =

- Theatrical release poster
- Directed by: R. Sundaram
- Written by: A. L. Narayanan
- Starring: Jaishankar; A. Sakunthala; Thengai Srinivasan
- Cinematography: C. A. S. Mani
- Edited by: L. Balu
- Music by: Vedha
- Production company: Modern Theatres
- Release date: 1 May 1970
- Running time: 137 minutes
- Country: India
- Language: Tamil

CID Shankar is a 1970 Indian Tamil-language spy thriller film, directed by R. Sundaram, produced by Modern Theatres and written by A. L. Narayanan. The music was by Vedha. It stars Jaishankar, A. Sakunthala, and Thengai Srinivasan. V. S. Raghavan, R. S. Manohar, C. L. Anandan, Jayakumari, B. V. Radha and M. Bhanumathi play supporting roles. The film was a remake of the 1965 French/Italian co-production Eurospy film OSS 117 Mission for a Killer. It was released on 1 May 1970, and became an average success. Sakunthala became known as "CID Sakunthala" after the film's release.

== Plot ==
The film begins with a politician being killed by a suicide bomber, who detonates her explosive belt. C. I. D. Shankar and his assistant Raju are deputed to the Nilgiris to investigate a case of mysterious murder. C. I. D. Ashokan also stays at the town, who poses as an herbal researcher, his close relation is lover's club dancer Reeta. Ashokan finds out the truth, and he goes to Nagamalai estate, where he gives a lift to a young girl who explodes her belt. Ashokan gives a diary and a locker key to Vidya, who saves his life and admits him into the hospital. But unfortunately, Ashokan is killed by a mysterious gang in hospital. Vidya gives the things to Shankar, and both fall in love. Raju falls in love with actress Rama, who also stays in the same hotel. Shankar meets Reeta and asks her to help him. She gives information to his assistant Raju and later on, she is killed by the same mysterious gang. Vidya asks help from her brother Sundaram for the herbal details.

Sundaram meets his friend Boopathy. Shankar was introduced to Boopathy by himself as an herbal researcher who gives the helpful information of the drug's details. Some particular herb grows at Nagamalai Estate inside the forest named the black forest, that herbal name was Arome and was produced into a drug. The drug was injected into the human body, which goes into hypnosis, and that person is used for the gang's illegal works. Boopathy receives Shankar, Vidya and her brother Sundaram and they go into the forest. They realise Boopathy is also one of the mysterious gangs, and they meet the gang leader in their hidden secret place. Shankar discovers that the murders are being committed by a terrorist gang, who are embarking on a secret movement. Vidya and Sundaram question Boopathy about their organisation, whether it kills their friends, relatives and families. By hearing this, Boopathi changes his mind and rescues Vidya, Sundaram, Raju, Shankar and others. Will CID Shankar, he able to accomplish his mission? Finally, Shankar is against gun fighting with the gang, and in this shooting, Boopathy dies and saves Vidya's life.

== Cast ==
Male cast

- Jaishankar as CID Shankar
- O. A. K. Thevar as Gang Leader
- Thengai Srinivasan as Raju
- V. S. Raghavan as DIG of Police
- C. L. Anandan
- Pakkirisamy as Ashokan
- Moorthy as Sundaram
- Manohar as Bhoopathi

Female cast

- A. Sakunthala as Vidya
- B. V. Radha as Rama
- Jayakumari as Rita
- Vijayamala as Fake Sujatha Rani
- M. Bhanumathi as Sujatha Rani

== Soundtrack ==
Music was composed by Vedha and lyrics were written by Kannadasan. The song "Andha Arayinale" was composed by lifting two popular Hindi songs: "Yeh Dil Na Hota Bechara" and "Dil Se Dil Milakar Dekho". "Nanathalie Kannam" wasinspired by the Jewel Thief song "Dil Pukare Aa Re".

Track listing
No.	Title	Singer(s)	Length
1.	"Antha Arayinile"	L. R. Eswari	3:10
2.	"Naanathale Kannam"	T. M. Soundararajan, P. Susheela	3:34
3.	"Brinthavanthil Poo"	T. M. Soundarajan, P. Susheela	4:20
4.	"Thaipoosa Thirunalile"	P. Susheela	3:21
5.	"Pattu Thikkuthadi"	S. V. Ponnusamy, L. R. Eswari	3:33
Total length:			17:58

== Accolades ==
Thengai Srinivasan won the Best Comedian award at the Chennai Film Fans Association Awards.
