= Amma Enge =

1964 film

- Directed by: G. Viswanathan
- Screenplay by: A. L. Narayanan; Seehampatti Rajagopal
- Produced by: T. R. Sundaram
- Starring: R. S. Manohar; Muthuraman; Chandrakantha; Rajasri
- Cinematography: H. S. Venu
- Music by: Vedha
- Production company: Modern Theatres
- Release date: 27 November 1964
- Country: India
- Language: Tamil

Amma Enge (transl. Where is mother?) is a 1964 Indian Tamil-language film directed by G. Viswanathan. The film stars Muthuraman, R. S. Manohar, Chandrakantha and Rajasri. It was released on 27 November 1964.

== Plot ==
Ranjitham is accused of stealing a diamond ring and she runs out of town with her father. Her father dies heartbroken. Ranjitham joins a family as a nanny for a young girl, Amutha. The girl's mother has left her family and her whereabouts unknown. The girl's father falls in love with Ranjitham and desires to marry her. He clears her name as the thief. The ring is found and is given as a gift to Ranjitham.

The young girl Amutha runs away and is later found safe in a forest by her father and Ranjitham.

Ranjitham agrees to marry Amutha's father who then goes to Madras to prepare for the wedding. Ranjitham goes to a temple with the girl's aunt and is secretly followed by Amutha. Amutha's aunt locks Ranjitham in the temple and asks her goons to kill Amutha. It is revealed the aunt had killed Amutha's mother so her daughter could marry the girl's father. Amutha's father goes back home at the right time and rescues Amutha and later Ranjitham from the temple. The aunt runs away and commits suicide. Ranjitham gets married and sees off Amutha to school.

== Cast ==
The list is adapted from the book Thiraikalanjiyam

Male

- R. S. Manohar
- Muthuraman
- Veerappan
- Vairam Krishnamoorthy
- Pazhaniyappan
- Ali

Female

- Chandrakantha
- Rajasree
- Baby Shakeela
- Madhavi
- B. V. Radha
- Saraswathi

== Production ==
The film was produced by T. R. Sundaram under the banner Modern Theatres and was directed by G. Viswanathan. Screenplay and dialogues were written by A. L. Narayanan and Seehampatti Rajagopal. H. M. Venu was the director of Cinematography.

== Soundtrack ==
The music was composed by Vedha and the lyrics were penned by Kannadasan, Panchu Arunachalam, Vaali and Nallathambi.

Song	Singer/s	Lyricist
"Pappa Pappa Kathai Kelu"	A. L. Raghavan	Vaali
"Nilavu Pirantha Nerathile"	P. Susheela with group	Vaali
"Thottup Paar Thodumpothu Inbam"	P. Susheela with group	Vaali
"Come Come Rosie"	A. L. Raghavan, L. R. Eswari	Vaali
"Akka Magalukku Sadai Neelam"	S. V. Ponnusamy, L. R. Eswari	Vaali
"Aakaasa Pandalile Ayiram Poo"	P. Susheela	Vaali
"Nenjukku Theriyum"	P. Susheela	Kannadasan
"(Mayakkam Mayakkam) Iravinil Oru Athisayam"	P. Susheela	Nallathambi
"Naan Vanangum Deivame"	P. Susheela, P. B. Srinivas	Nallathambi
"Amma Amma Enge Pone"	M. S. Rajeswari	Panju Arunasalam

== Reception ==
Writing for Kalki, S. Neelakantan said viewers needed three things before watching the film: patience, a liniment for headaches, and a pillow.
