= Oru Viral Krishna Rao =

Indian actor and comedian

- Born: 1929
- Died: 16 August 2002 (aged 73); Chennai, India
- Occupation: Actor
- Years active: 1965–2002

Oru Viral Krishna Rao was an Indian actor and comedian who appeared in predominantly Tamil-language films. A recipient of the state government's Kalaimamani award, Rao got the nickname Oru Viral (one finger) for his first Tamil film in 1965. He acted in nearly 600 Tamil and Telugu films in a career spanning four decades. Rao is famous because of his dance skills. He has choreographed for more than 120 films. Rao is also a member of Kaavi Sattai Sangam (KSS) run by Saravana Thevar.

== Partial filmography ==
=== Tamil films ===
Year	Film	Role	Notes
1965	Oru Viral	Police constable	
1967	Rajathi	Crazy man	
1970	Enga Mama	Police constable	
1973	Sollathaan Ninaikkiren	Shop owner	
1974	Naan Avanillai	Rao	
1974	Anbu Thangai		
1975	Thennangkeetru	Coconut seller	
1977	Navarathinam		
1978	Nizhal Nijamagiradhu	Kalimuthu	
1978	Tripurasundari	College lecturer	
1980	Varumayin Niram Sivappu		
1980	Jamboo		
1981	Uchakattam		
1981	Thillu Mullu		
1982	Thaai Mookaambikai		
1983	Poikkal Kudhirai		
1984	January 1		
1984	Nalam Nalamariya Aaval		
1984	Naan Mahaan Alla	Henchman	
1986	Thazhuvatha Kaigal		
1987	Kavalan Avan Kovalan	Kaatangulathur Kathadi	
1987	Anbulla Appa		
1987	Raja Mariyadhai		
1987	Shankar Guru		
1987	Chellakutti		
1988	Puthiya Vaanam		
1988	Veedu	Villager	
1988	Paadatha Theneekkal	Stage artist	Uncredited
1989	En Arumai Manaivi		
1989	Sattathin Marupakkam		
1990	Salem Vishnu		
1990	Ethir Kaatru		
1990	Ulagam Pirandhadhu Enakkaga		
1990	En Kadhal Kanmani	Vinod's uncle	
1991	Kizhakku Karai		
1991	Gokulam		
1991	Chinna Thambi	Muniyandi	
1991	Thalattu Ketkuthamma		
1991	Thayamma	Anand's Uncle	
1991	Nadigan		
1991	Nallathai Naadu Kekum	Panchayat Man	
1992	Brahmachari		
1992	Idhu Namma Bhoomi		
1992	Sevagan		
1992	Singaravelan	Marriage broker	
1992	Suyamariyadhai		
1993	Pettredutha Pillai		
1993	Rajadhi Raja Raja Kulothunga Raja Marthanda Raja Gambeera Kathavaraya Krishna Kamarajan		
1993	Gokulam		
1993	Marupadiyum		
1993	Ulle Veliye		
1993	Rojavai Killathe		
1993	Udan Pirappu		
1993	Sabash Babu		
1993	Kizhakke Varum Paattu		
1994	Oru Vasantha Geetham	Witness	
1994	Priyanka		
1994	Varavu Ettana Selavu Pathana		
1995	Nadodi Mannan		
1995	Aanazhagan		
1996	Irattai Roja	doctor	
1996	Kaalam Maari Pochu	Muthupandi's father	
1996	Senathipathi		
1997	Pistha		
1997	Pongalo Pongal		
1998	Cheran Chozhan Pandian	Vanagamudi	
1998	Santhosham	Tea master	
1999	Thodarum		
1999	Thirupathi Ezhumalai Venkatesa		
2001	Ullam Kollai Poguthae	Jobless man	

=== Other language films ===
Year	Film	Role	Language
1975	Nireekshe	Coconut seller	Kannada
1986	Ukku Manishi		Telugu
1991	Kshana Kshanam	Apartment resident	Telugu
1993	Money	Renu's father	Telugu
1993	Vintha Kodallu		Telugu
1994	Srivari Priyuralu		Telugu
1996	Family		Telugu
1997	W/o V. Vara Prasad		Telugu

== Television ==
- Vannakolangal (Episode: S S Mama) (1986)

== Death ==
Krishna Rao died in a private hospital on Friday, 16 August 2002, a month after suffering a blood clot in his brain.
