= R. S. Manohar =

Indian actor

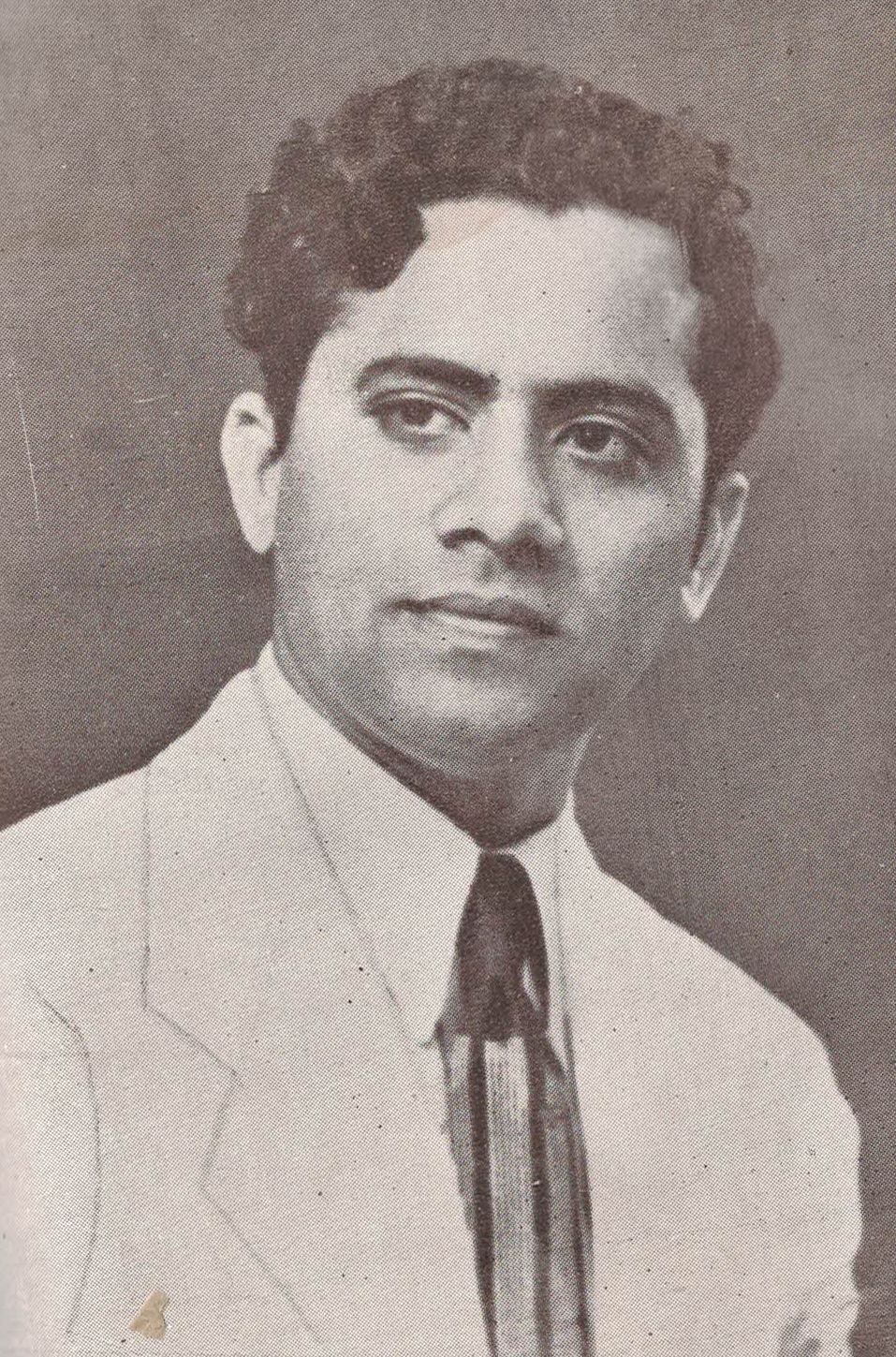
- R. S. Manohar (1951)
- Born: Lakshminarasimman; 29 June 1925; Rasipuram, Salem District, Madras Presidency, British India (now in Namakkal District, Tamil Nadu, India)
- Died: 10 January 2006 (aged 80); Chennai, Tamil Nadu, India
- Occupation: Actor
- Years active: 1951–1992
- Works: Filmography
- Spouse: Seethalakshmi
- Children: 2
- Relatives: Delhi Kumar (cousin)

Rasipuram Subramaniyan Iyer Manohar (29 June 1925 – 10 January 2006) was an Indian actor who performed roles ranging from hero to villain to comedic characters. He was born at Namakkal in 1925. He acted in over 200 films. He is known for his versatility and dominating personality. He is also known as Nadaga Kavalar for his love of stage plays and his passion for continuing to stage mythological plays almost his entire life.

== Biography ==
Rasipuram Subramaniyan Iyer Manohar was born as R. S. Lakshminarasimman on 29 June 1925 in Rasipuram, present-day Namakkal district, Tamil Nadu. Subramaniyan Iyer and Rajalakshmi Ammal. He got the name Manohar after playing the lead role in the school play Manohara. He graduated from Pachaiyappa's College, Chennai.

According to film historian Randor Guy, Manohar got a break in films with Rajambal (1951) when, as a graduate, he was employed in the Postal Department. Producer R. M. Krishnaswamy booked him for the lead role in the film. As his name was not considered "filmi", it was changed to R. S. Manohar.

While in college, Manohar frequently performed in stage plays. After graduation, he joined films. His first effort was Rajamabal, produced by Aruna Films. His early memorable roles were in films such as Vannakkili, Kaidhi Kannayiram, Vallavanukku Vallavan, Vallavan Oruvan and Iru Vallavargal.

But Manohar is best remembered for the negative roles he played, especially while facing off with M. G. Ramachandran in films such as Ayirathil Oruvan, Ulagam Suttrum Valliban, Pallandu Vazhga, Adimai Penn, Kaavalkaaran and Idayakkani.

Manohar is also remembered for his immense contributions to Tamil theatre. After Nawab Rajamanikkam, it was Manohar who took theatre to a higher plane. Most of the 31 plays in which he acted - altogether totaling 7,950 performances - were adaptations or interpretations of historical incidents or mythological stories.

Famous among Manohar's plays are Ilangeswaran, Chanakkiya Sabadam, Soorapadman, Sisupalan, Indrajith, Sukrachariyar, Naragasooran and Thirunavukkarasar.

He was a pioneer in introducing 'dramascope' with stereophonic sound system, split second transformation of sets and pyrotechniques to represent battle scenes.

He received many awards for his contributions to drama and cinema, including a 'Nadaka Kavalar' award from MGR in 1970.

== Dramatist ==
Manohar acted in a number of plays. Some of the famous ones are Ilangeswaran, Chanakkiya Sabadam, Soorapadman, Sisupalan, Indrajith, Sukrachariyar, Naragasooran and Thirunavukkarasar. He was also involved in the production of an English play, Last Tango in Heaven. It was later released as a movie God Only Knows!.
