= Thiruvilaiyadal =

1965 film A. P. Nagarajan

- Theatrical release poster
- Directed by: A. P. Nagarajan
- Screenplay by: A. P. Nagarajan
- Based on: Thiruvilaiyadal Puranam by Paranjothi Munivar
- Produced by: A. P. Nagarajan; A. M. Shahul Hameed
- Starring: Sivaji Ganesan; Savitri; K. B. Sundarambal
- Narrated by: A. P. Nagarajan
- Cinematography: K. S. Prasanth
- Edited by: M. N. Rajan; T. R. Natarajan
- Music by: K. V. Mahadevan
- Production company: Sri Vijayalakshmi Pictures
- Distributed by: Sivaji Films
- Release date: 31 July 1965
- Running time: 155 minutes
- Country: India
- Language: Tamil

Thiruvilaiyadal (transl. The Divine Game) is a 1965 Indian Tamil-language Hindu mythological film written, directed and co-produced by A. P. Nagarajan. The film stars Sivaji Ganesan, Savitri, and K. B. Sundarambal, with T. S. Balaiah, R. Muthuraman, Nagesh, T. R. Mahalingam, K. Sarangapani, Devika, Manorama, and Nagarajan in supporting roles. K. V. Mahadevan composed the film's soundtrack and score, and Kannadasan and Sankaradas Swamigal wrote the song lyrics.

Thiruvilaiyadal was inspired by the Thiruvilaiyadal Puranam: a collection of sixty-four Shaivite devotional, epic stories, written in the 16th century by Paranjothi Munivar, which record Shiva's actions on Earth in a number of disguises to test his devotees. Thiruvilaiyadal depicts four of the stories. The first is about the poets Dharumi and Nakkeerar; the second concerns Dhakshayani. The third recounts how Shiva's future wife, Parvati, is born as a fisherwoman; Shiva marries her in the guise of a fisherman. The fourth story is about the singers Banabhathirar and Hemanatha Bhagavathar.

Thiruvilaiyadal was released on 31 July 1965 to critical praise for its screenplay, dialogue, direction, music and the performances of Ganesan, Nagesh and Balaiah. The film was a commercial success, running for over 25 weeks in many theatres and becoming a silver jubilee film. It was also responsible for a resurgence of devotional and mythological cinema, since it was released when Tamil cinema was primarily producing social films. (Note: In Indian cinema terminology, social films (or simply socials) are films with a contemporary setting, as opposed to those which have mythological or period settings.) Thiruvilaiyadal received the Certificate of Merit for the Second-Best Feature Film in Tamil at the 13th National Film Awards and the Filmfare Award for Best Film – Tamil. A digitally-restored version was released in September 2012, which was also a commercial success.

== Plot ==
The Hindu god Shiva gives a sacred mango fruit, brought by the sage Narada, to his elder son Vinayaka as a prize for outsmarting his younger brother Muruga in a competition. Angry with his father, Muruga (dressed as a hermit) goes to Palani. He meets Avvaiyar, one of his devotees, along the way. Despite her attempts to convince Muruga to return to Mount Kailash, he remains adamant about his decision to leave his family. His mother, the goddess Parvati, arrives there and tells the stories of four of Shiva's divine games to calm Muruga.

The first story is set in Madurai, the capital city of the Pandya Kingdom. Shenbagapandian, the king, wants to find the answer to a question posed by his wife (whether the fragrance of a woman's hair is natural or artificial), and announces a reward of 1,000 gold coins to anyone who can come up with the answer. Dharumi, a poor poet, desperately wants the reward, and starts to break down in the Meenakshi Amman Temple. Shiva, hearing him weeping, takes the form of a poet and gives Dharumi a poem containing the answer. Overjoyed, Dharumi takes the poem to Shenbagapandian's court and recites it; however, the court's head poet Nakkeerar claims that the poem's meaning is incorrect. On hearing this, Shiva argues with Nakkeerar about the poem's accuracy and burns him to ashes when he refuses to relent. Later, Shiva revives Nakkeerar and says that he only wanted to test his knowledge. Realising it was Shiva's will that Dharumi should get the reward, Nakkeerar requests Shenbagapandian to give it to Dharumi.

The second story focuses on Shiva marrying Sati against the will of her father, Daksha. Daksha performs a Mahayajna without inviting his son-in-law. Sati asks Shiva's permission to go to the ceremony, but Shiva refuses to let her go because he feels that no good will come from it. Sati disobeys him and goes, only to be insulted by Daksha. She curses her father and returns to Shiva, who is angry with her. Sati says that they are one; without her, there is no Shiva. He disagrees, and burns her to ashes. He then performs his Tandava, which is noticed by the Devas, who pacify him. Shiva restores Sati to life (who is reborn as Parvati) and accepts their oneness.

In the third story, Parvati is banished by Shiva when she is momentarily distracted while listening to his explanation of the Vedas. Parvati, now born as Kayarkanni, is the daughter of a fisherman. When she is playing with her friends, Shiva approaches in the guise of a fisherman and tries to flirt with her. The fishermen are troubled by a giant shark who disrupts their way of life, and Shiva says that he alone can defeat the shark. After a long battle, Shiva subdues the shark (who is the bull deity Nandi in disguise) and marries Parvati.

The last story is about Banabathirar, a devotional singer. Hemanatha Bhagavathar, a talented singer, tries to conquer the Pandya Kingdom when he challenges its musicians. The king's minister advises the king to seek Banabathirar's help against Bhagavathar. When the other musicians spurn the competition, the king orders Banabathirar to compete against Bhagavathar. Knowing that he cannot win, the troubled Banabathirar prays to Shiva—who appears outside Bhagavathar's house in the form of a firewood vendor the night before the competition, and shatters his arrogance by singing "Paattum Naane". Shiva introduces himself to Bhagavathar as Banabathirar's student. Sheepish at hearing this, Bhagavathar leaves the kingdom immediately and leaves a letter for Shiva to give to Banabathirar. Shiva gives the letter to Banabathirar, and reveals his true identity; Banabathirar thanks him for his help.

After listening to the stories, Muruga realises that this too was one of Shiva's divine games to test his patience; he then reconciles with his family. The film ends with Avvaiyar singing "Vaasi Vaasi" and "Ondraanavan Uruvil", in praise of Shiva and Parvati.

== Cast ==
- Sivaji Ganesan as Shiva
- Savitri as Parvati, Sati, Kayarkanni
- K. B. Sundarambal as Avvaiyar
- T. S. Balaiah as Hemanatha Bhagavathar
- R. Muthuraman as Shenbagapandiyan
- Nagesh as Dharumi
- O. A. K. Thevar as Daksha
- A. Karunanidhi as Sovai
- T. R. Mahalingam as Banabathirar
- A. P. Nagarajan as Nakkeerar
- K. Sarangapani as Kayarkanni's father
- E. R. Sahadevan as Pandiya King Varagunapandiyan
- Devika as Shenbagapandiyan's wife
- Manorama as Ponni
- G. Sakunthala as Banabathirar's wife
- Baby Susarita as Murugan

== Production ==
=== Development ===
In 1965, after the critical and commercial success of Navarathri (1964), its director A. P. Nagarajan and producer A. M. Shahul Hameed came together to make a film entitled Siva-Leela, later retitled Thiruvilaiyadal. It was inspired by the Thiruvilaiyadal Puranam, a collection of sixty-four 16th-century Shaivite devotional epic stories by Paranjothi Munivar, which describe the actions (and antics) of Shiva on Earth in a number of disguises to test his devotees.

Four of the Thiruvilaiyadal Puranam's stories are depicted in the film, including the story where the Tamil poet Nakkeerar confronts Shiva over an error in his poem, exaggerating his sensitivity to the right and the wrong. Nagarajan had previously used this story as a play within a film in K. Somu's Naan Petra Selvam (1956). In addition to directing, Nagarajan co-produced Thiruvilaiyadal under the banner of Sri Vijayalakshmi Pictures, and wrote the screenplay. M. N. Rajan and T. R. Natarajan edited Thiruvilaiyadal; K. S. Prasad and Ganga were the film's cinematographer and art director, respectively.

Sivaji Ganesan was cast as Shiva, and Savitri as the goddess Parvati. R. Rangasamy did the make-up for Ganesan, and Savitri was given green make-up to portray her character. K. B. Sundarambal was chosen to play Avvaiyar, reprising her role in the 1953 film of the same name. Nagesh was cast as Dharumi, and had a call sheet of one-and-a-half days to finish his portion. Besides directing, producing and writing, Nagarajan appeared as Nakkeerar. M. Balamuralikrishna initially wanted to portray Hemanatha Bhagavathar but Nagarajan refused, believing T. S. Balaiah would be able to emote the character better. Balamuralikrishna agreed, and remained on the film as a singer.

=== Filming ===
We had to talk as we walked. We could not break up the dialogues for our convenience as that would slow down the tempo of the shot. We had such a degree of understanding that we enacted the scene with immaculate timing and with the required expressions in one continuous shot.

— Sivaji Ganesan on his experience filming with Nagesh, Autobiography of an Actor: Sivaji Ganesan, October 1928 – July 2001.

Thiruvilaiyadal was shot on a custom-built set at Vasu Studios in Madras (now Chennai). It was filmed in Eastmancolor, thereby making it Nagarajan's first picture to be shot in colour. Before he began filming, Nagesh learned that Ganesan's arrival was delayed because his make-up had not been completed; he asked Nagarajan whether they could film any solo sequences, which included a scene where Dharumi laments his misfortune in the Meenakshi Amman Temple. While filming, Nagesh spontaneously came up with the line "Varamaattan. Varamaattan. Avan nichchaiyam varamaattan. Enakku nalla theriyum. Varamaattan" (He won't come. He won't come. He will definitely not come. I know he won't come). According to the actor, two incidents inspired him. One involved two assistant directors discussing whether Ganesan would be ready before or after lunch; one said he would be ready, the other said not. The other was when Nagesh overheard a passerby talking to himself about how the world had fallen on bad times. He also took inspiration from Mylapore Krishnasamy Iyer.

Dubbing of the scenes with Nagesh and Ganesan was completed soon after the footage was shot. After watching the scenes twice, Ganesan asked Nagarajan not to remove even a single frame of Nagesh's portions from the final cut, because he believed that those scenes along with the ones involving Balaiah would be the highlights of the film. The conversations between Shiva and Dharumi were improvised by Ganesan and Nagesh, not scripted by Nagarajan. Thiruvilaiyadal was the first Tamil film since Jagathalapratapan (1944) in which the lead actor plays five roles in one scene. Ganesan does so during the song "Paattum Naane", where he sings and plays four instruments: the veena, mridangam, flute and jathi. Asked by his biographer, T. S. Narayanawami, about the Tandava he performed in the film, Ganesan replied that he simply learned the movements necessary for the dance and followed the choreographer's instructions. Thiruvilaiyadal was the last film produced by Hameed, who died on 20 May 1965, a few days after the filming ended. Neither he nor Nagarajan was credited in the film as producers.

== Themes ==
The film's title is explained in an introductory voiceover. Greeting the audience, it quotes Shiva's literary epic of the same name. According to the narrator (Nagarajan), Shiva does what he does to test the patience of his disciples; the god plays games, which evoke more devotion in the hearts of his worshippers. Therefore, the film's title refers to the games played by Shiva. According to Hari Narayan of The Hindu, Thiruvilaiyadal celebrates the deeds of a god (in this case, Shiva) by depicting miracles performed by him. R. Bharathwaj wrote for The Times of India that the story of the competition between Hemanatha Bhagavathar and Banabathirar is comparable to a contest between Carnatic music composer Shyama Shastri and Kesavvaya, a singer from Bobbili. Sastri had sought divine intervention from the goddess Kamakshi to defeat Kesavayya, mirroring Banabathirar's plea for Shiva's help. Mana Baskaran of Hindu Tamil Thisai notes that the film, despite being a mythological, also depicts contemporary social issues.

== Music ==
K. V. Mahadevan composed the film's soundtrack and score, Kannadasan wrote the song lyrics except for the first portions of "Pazham Neeyappa", which were written by Sankaradas Swamigal. Nagarajan initially wanted Sirkazhi Govindarajan to sing "Oru Naal Podhuma", but he refused and M. Balamuralikrishna sang the song. Each line in the song is from a different raga, including Darbar, Todi, Maand, and Mohanam. "Pazham Neeyappa" is based on three ragas: Darbari Kanada, Shanmukhapriya and Kambhoji. "Isai Thamizh", "Paattum Naane" and "Illadhathondrillai" are based on the Abheri, Gourimanohari and Simhendramadhyamam ragas, respectively. Vikku Vinayakram and Cheena Kutty were the ghatam and mridangam players, respectively, for "Paattum Naane". Subbiah Asari made the Macha Veena seen in "Paattum Naane", and the crew of Thiruvilaiyadal purchased it from him for ₹10,000 (equivalent to ₹730,000 or US$7,800 in 2026).

Songs from the album, including "Pazham Neeyappa", "Oru Naal Podhuma", "Isai Thamizh", "Paarthal Pasumaram" and "Paattum Naane", became popular with the Tamil diaspora. Film historian Randor Guy, in his 1997 book Starlight, Starbright: The Early Tamil Cinema, said "Pazham Neeyappa" (performed by Sundarambal) was the "favourite of millions". Singer Charulatha Mani wrote for The Hindu that Sundarambal produced a "pure and pristine depiction" of the Neelambari raga in "Vaasi Vaasi", and praised Balamuralikrishna's rendition of "Oru Naal Podhuma".

Track listing
| No. | Title | Singer(s) | Length |
|---|---|---|---|
| 1. | "Pazham Neeyappaa" | K. B. Sundarambal | 06:29 |
| 2. | "Oru Naal Podhumaa" | M. Balamuralikrishna | 05:28 |
| 3. | "Isai Thamizh" | T. R. Mahalingam | 03:50 |
| 4. | "Paarthaal Pasumaram" | T. M. Soundararajan | 03:44 |
| 5. | "Paattum Naane" | T. M. Soundararajan | 05:54 |
| 6. | "Podhigai Malai Uchchiyiley" | P. B. Sreenivas, S. Janaki | 02:52 |
| 7. | "Ondraanavan Uruvil" | K. B. Sundarambal | 03:04 |
| 8. | "Illaadhathondrillai" | T. R. Mahalingam | 03:08 |
| 9. | "Vaasi Vaasi" | K. B. Sundarambal | 05:57 |
| 10. | "Om Namasivaaya" | Sirkazhi Govindarajan, P. Susheela | 03:32 |
| 11. | "Neela Chelai Katti Konda" | P. Susheela | 04:40 |
| Total length: | | | 45:30 |

== Release ==
Thiruvilaiyadal was released on 31 July 1965, and distributed by Sivaji Films. During a screening at a Madras cinema, several women went into a religious frenzy during a scene with Avvaiyar and Murugan. The film was temporarily suspended so the women could be attended to. According to artist Jeeva, the management of the Raja Theatre built a replica of Mount Kailash to promote Thiruvilaiyadal. A commercial success, the film ran for twenty-five weeks at the Ganesan-owned Shanti Theatre. It also ran for twenty-five weeks at the Crown and Bhuvaneshwari Theatres in Madras and other theatres across South India, becoming a silver jubilee film. (Note: A silver jubilee film is one that runs for at least twenty-five weeks in a single theatre.) It added to Ganesan's string of successful films. At the 13th National Film Awards, Thiruvilaiyadal received the Certificate of Merit for the Second-Best Feature Film in Tamil. It also received the Filmfare Award for Best Film – Tamil.

== Reception ==
Thiruvilayadal was praised by critics. The Tamil magazine Kalki, in a review dated 22 August 1965, considered the film a victory for Tamil cinema. Shanmugam Pillai and Meenakshi Ammal of Ananda Vikatan jointly reviewed the film on the same day. Shanmugam Pillai praised the tandava and said Nagarajan deserved to be appreciated for taking such a long epic and making it into a film. Although Meenakshi Ammal felt it was unnecessary to have a Tamil poet (Dharumi) do comedy, Shanmugam Pillai applauded Nagesh for showing his comic skills even in a mythological. Meenakshi Ammal noted that at a time when social films were dominating Tamil cinema, a mythological like Thiruvilaiyadal was a welcome change and deserved another viewing.

On 7 August 1965, The Indian Express appreciated Nagarajan for treating the four episodes adapted from the Thiruvilayadal Puranam with "due reverence and respect" and chaste Tamil dialogue (a "delight to the ears"). However, the reviewer derided Nagarajan's "unimaginative" handling of the fisherman episode and Ganesan's "awkward" gestures, which turned what would have been a "sublime, divine love story" into a typical "boy-meets-girl affair". They also criticised technical aspects such as "jumpy" shots, the colour scheme, Shiva's fight with the shark and the facial make-up. The reviewer criticised Ganesan for overacting while opining that Savitri had nothing to do, but commended the performances of Sundarambal, Mahalingam, Balaiah, Nagesh, Sarangapani, Muthuraman and Nagarajan.

On 4 September 1965, T. M. Ramachandran wrote for Sport and Pastime, "Both for the devout Hindu and the average movie fan, the picture provides such elements that sustain their interest from beginning to end." He noted that although there were anachronisms such as telephone and telegraph wires visible, "these defects pale into insignificance before the gloss and satisfying impact of the film as a whole on the minds of cinegoers." Ramachandran lauded Ganesan's performance, his tandava, the performances of Savitri, Nagarajan and the other supporting actors, Sundarambal's singing, K. S. Prasad's cinematography and Ganga's art direction.

== Re-release ==
In mid-2012, legal issues arose when attempts were made to digitally re-release the film. G. Vijaya of Vijaya Pictures filed a lawsuit against Gemini Colour Laboratory and Sri Vijayalakshmi Pictures for attempting to re-release the film without her company's permission. In December 1975, Sri Vijayalakshmi Pictures transferred the film rights to Movie Film Circuit; MFC transferred them to Vijaya Pictures on 18 May 1976. Vijaya Pictures approached Gemini to digitise the film for re-release, but Sri Vijayalakshmi Pictures asked laboratory officials not to release the film without their consent. Sri Vijayalakshmi Pictures disputed Vijaya's claim by running an advertisement in a Tamil newspaper on 18 May 2012 saying that it owned the film's rights, and anyone who wanted to exhibit it in a digital format should only do so with their permission. The judge who presided over the case ordered that the status quo be maintained by both parties.

Encouraged by the success of the re-release of Karnan (1964), C. N. Paramasivam (Nagarajan's son and the head of Sri Vijayalakshmi Pictures) found film negatives of Thiruvilayadal in a Gemini Films storage facility. Paramasivam restored the film and re-released it in CinemaScope in September 2012. The digitised version premiered at the Woodlands Theater in Royapettah, Chennai. It received public acclaim and became a commercial success. Producer Ramkumar (Ganesan's son) said about the digitised version, "It was like watching a new film".

== Legacy and influence ==
Only two actors can pull the scene away from under my feet when we face the camera together – one is M. R. Radha, the other, Nagesh.

— Ganesan, while listening to an audio version of Thiruvilaiyadal

Thiruvilaiyadal has attained cult status in Tamil cinema. Along with Karnan, it was responsible for a resurgence in devotional and mythological cinema, since it was released at a time when Tamil cinema primarily made social films. Film critic Baradwaj Rangan called Thiruvilaiyadal "the best" Tamil film epic released during the 1960s. Nagarajan and Ganesan collaborated on many more films in the genre, including Saraswathi Sabatham (1966), Thiruvarutchelvar (1967), Kandhan Karunai (1967) and Thirumal Perumai (1968). The film was a milestone of Nagesh's career, and the character of Dharumi is cited as one of his finest roles.

In July 2007, when S. R. Ashok Kumar of The Hindu asked eight notable directors to list ten films they liked the most, C. V. Sridhar and Ameer chose Thiruvilaiyadal. Ameer found the film "imaginative", depicting mythology in "an interesting way", and called it "one of the best films in the annals of Tamil cinema." After Nagesh's death in 2009, Thiruvilaiyadal ranked fifth on the Sify list of "10 Best Films of late Nagesh"; according to its entry, the actor "was at his comic best in this film". Thiruvilaiyadal is included with other Sivaji Ganesan films in 8th Ulaga Adhisayam Sivaji, a compilation DVD with Ganesan's "iconic performances in the form of scenes, songs and stunts", which was released in May 2012.

The film has been parodied and referenced in cinema, television and theatre. Notable films alluding to Thiruvilaiyadal include Poove Unakkaga (1996), Mahaprabhu (1996), Kaathala Kaathala (1998), Vanna Thamizh Pattu (2000), Middle Class Madhavan (2001), Kamarasu (2002), Kanthaswamy (2009) and Oru Kal Oru Kannadi (2012). In his review of Oru Kanniyum Moonu Kalavaanikalum (2014), Baradwaj Rangan noted that the use of touchscreen human facial icons on mobile apps was a "Thiruvilaiyadal-like framing device". The Star Vijay comedy series Lollu Sabha parodied the film twice: in an episode of the same name, and in a contemporary version titled Naveena Thiruvilayaadal.

After T. M. Soundararajan's death in May 2013, M. Ramesh of Business Line wrote: "The unforgettable sequences from ... [Thiruvilaiyadal] ... have forever divided the world of Tamil music lovers in two: those who believe that the [Oru Naal Podhuma] of the swollen-headed Hemanatha Bhagavathar could not be bested, and those who believe that Lord Shiva's Paattum Naane Bhavamum Naane won the debate hands down". The character of Dharumi was parodied in Iruttula Thedatheenga, a play staged in November 2013. In a January 2015 interview with The Times of India, playwright Y. G. Mahendran said: "Most character artists today lack variety [...] Show me one actor in India currently who can do a [Veerapandiya] Kattabomman, a VOC, a Vietnam Veedu, a Galatta Kalyanam and a Thiruvilayadal [sic]." After Manorama's death in October 2015, Thiruvilaiyadal was ranked eighth on The New Indian Express' list of top movies featuring the actress.

== Bibliography ==
- David, C. R. W. (1983). Cinema as Medium of Communication in Tamil Nadu. Christian Literature Society.
- Ganesan, Sivaji; Narayana Swamy, T. S. (2007) [2002]. Autobiography of an Actor: Sivaji Ganesan, October 1928 – July 2001. Sivaji Prabhu Charities Trust. OCLC 297212002.
- Guy, Randor (1997). Starlight, Starbright: The Early Tamil Cinema. Amra Publishers. OCLC 1129588233.
- Nagarajan, A. P. (1965). Thiruvilayadal (motion picture). India: Sri Vijayalakshmi Pictures.
- Panikkar, K. N. (2002). Culture, Ideology, Hegemony: Intellectuals and Social Consciousness in Colonial India. Anthem Press. ISBN 978-1-84331-039-6.
- Rajadhyaksha, Ashish; Willemen, Paul (1998) [1994]. Encyclopaedia of Indian Cinema. British Film Institute and Oxford University Press. ISBN 0-19-563579-5.
- Rajya V. R., Rashmi (2014). "Narrative Strategies and Communication of Values in Tamil Epic Tradition Films of A. P. Nagarajan" (PDF). University of Madras.
- Sundararaman (2007) [2005]. Raga Chintamani: A Guide to Carnatic Ragas Through Tamil Film Music (2nd ed.). Chennai: Pichhamal Chintamani. OCLC 295034757.
- Thiagarajan, K. (1965). Meenakshi Temple, Madurai. Meenakshi Sundareswarar Temple Renovation Committee.
