= P. D. Sambandam =

Comic actor

P.D. Sambandam
- Occupations: Film and stage actor
- Years active: 1949–1969

P. D. Sambandam was an Indian comic actor who has performed many supporting and minor roles in Tamil films.

== Filmography ==
Year	Film	Role	Director
1949	Vaazhkai		A.V. Meiyappan
1950	Jeevitham	Seenu	A.V. Meiyappan
1954	Penn		M. V. Raman
1954	Andha Naal	Chinnaiah Pillai	S. Balachander
1955	Gomathiyin Kaadhalan	Sinnaveli Kanakkupulla	P. Neelakantan
1955	Kathanayaki		K. Ramnoth
1955	Town Bus		K. Somu
1955	Chella Pillai	Murugan	M. V. Raman
1956	Naan Petra Selvam	Anthony	K. Somu
1957	Makkalai Petra Magarasi	Kaaduvetti Kanakkupillai	K. Somu
1957	Baagyavathi	Saminathan	L. V. Prasad
1957	Anbe Deivam		R. Nagendra Rao
1958	Sampoorna Ramayanam		K. Somu
1958	Neelavukku Neranja Manasu	Servant	K. Somu
1958	Nalla Idathu Sammandham	Rummy	K. Somu
1959	Manjal Mahimai	Kailasam's father	A. Subba Rao
1959	Uthami Petra Rathinam		M. A. Thirumugam
1959	Kan Thiranthathu		
1960	Paattaaliyin Vetri		A. Subba Rao
1960	Adutha Veettu Penn		Vedantam Raghavayya
1960	Kairasi		K. Shankar
1960	Ondrupattal Undu Vazhvu		T. R. Ramanna
1961	Kumudham		Adurthi Subba Rao
1962	Avana Ivan	School Teacher	S. Balachander
1962	Aadi Perukku	Koithan Pillai	K. Shankar
1963	Yarukku Sontham		K. V. Srinivasan
1963	Kattu Roja	Shanmuga Mudaliar	A. Subbha Rao
1963	Kulamagal Radhai		A. P. Nagarajan
1963	Naan Vanangum Deivam		
1964	Vazhi Piranthadu		A. K. Velan
1964	Bommai		S. Balachander
1964	Navarathri		A. P. Nagarajan
1965	Anbu Karangal	Saint	K. Shankar
1965	Thiruvilaiyadal	musician in Hemanatha's troupe	A. P. Nagarajan
1965	Vaazhkai Padagu		C. Srinivasan
1966	Anbe Vaa	Cameo, as the head servant in JB's mansion	A. C. Tirulokchandar
1967	Bama Vijayam	Cameo, as Radha's father	K. Balachander
1967	Athey Kangal		A. C. Tirulokchandar
1967	Thiruvarutchelvar	Washerman	A. P. Nagarajan
1968	Thirumal Perumai		A. P. Nagarajan
1968	Thillana Mohanambal	Thaalam player in Sundaram's troupe	A. P. Nagarajan
1969	En Thambi		A. C. Tirulokchandar
1969	Lakshmi Kalyanam		G. Or. Nathan
1969	Gurudhatchanai	James	A. P. Nagarajan
