= Pennarasi =

- Theatrical release poster
- Directed by: K. Somu
- Written by: A. P. Nagarajan
- Produced by: M. A. Venu
- Starring: P. Kannamba; A. P. Nagarajan; M. N. Nambiar; P. S. Veerappa; Rajasulochana; Suryakala
- Cinematography: J. G. Vijayam
- Edited by: T. Vijayarangam
- Music by: K. V. Mahadevan
- Production company: M. A. V. Pictures
- Distributed by: Raja Films
- Release date: 14 April 1955
- Running time: 15,430 ft.
- Country: India
- Language: Tamil

Pennarasi (transl. Queen) is a 1955 Indian Tamil-language film starring A. P. Nagarajan and P. Kannamba. It was released on 14 April 1955.

== Plot ==
The film is about a queen whose kingdom was protected by the commander. While the commander is loyal to the queen, her minister is a wily person. The chieftain of a neighbouring land is trying to grab the queen's kingdom with the connivance of a wily minister. The chieftain sends his court dancer who is also his mistress to seduce the minister. In the end, the villains are exposed.

== Cast ==
The list was adapted from an article of the film's review.

Male cast

- Nalvar Nagarajan as the Commander Vikraman
- M. N. Nambiar as the Minister Vijayasimman
- P. S. Veerappa as the Chieftain Marthandan (Sornapuri)
- E. R. Sahadevan as Mathisegaran
- V. M. Ezhumalai as
- A. Karunanidhi as Veeran
- O. A. K. Thevar as Magudapathi
- P. S. Vengadachalam as Chief Minister Chithrasenan
- M. A. Ganapathi
- R. Pakkirisami as Alahalan
- S. M. Thirupathisami

Female cast

- P. Kannamba as the Queen
- P. R. Sulochana as the court dancer Jeeva
- Suryakala as Manjula (Commander's lover)
- E. V. Saroja as Mallika
- C. T. Rajakantham as Commander Vikraman's mother
- P. Kanaka as Ranjitha
- M. K. Vijaya as

== Production ==
The film was produced by M. A. Venu who also made Sampoorna Ramayanam, Mangalyam, Town Bus, Panam Panthiyile and Mudhalali. This film, Pennarasi, was produced at Central Studios, Coimbatore.

== Soundtrack ==
The music was composed by K. V. Mahadevan.

Song	Singer	Lyricist	Duration
"Nethiyile Neela Nira Pottu"	S. C. Krishnan, P. Kanaka	A. Maruthakasi	03:22
"Konjam Kooda Kuri Thavaraadhu .. Thenamudham"	Jikki	A. Maruthakasi	
"Ulagam Chezhippathu Pennaaley"	P. Leela	A. Maruthakasi	02:46
"Inbam Enguminge"	Thiruchi Loganathan, M. S. Rajeswari	A. Maruthakasi	03:05
"Seer Valara"	T. M. Soundararajan	A. Maruthakasi	02:39
"Chandiran Madhiyam .. Paathaiyin Mele Viliyai Vaithu"	S. C. Krishnan, P. Kanaka, Thiruchi Loganathan, M. S. Rajeswari	Ka. Mu. Sheriff	03:48
"Venradhu Soozhchi"	T. M. Soundararajan	Ka. Mu. Sheriff	01:28
"Pennai Petha Appan"	S. C. Krishnan, U. R. Chandra	Ka. Mu. Sheriff	
"Thodaathe Thodaathe"	S. C. Krishnan, P. Kanaka	Ka. Mu. Sheriff	
