= Gurudhakshaneiy =

Gurudhakshanai
- Theatrical release poster
- Directed by: A. P. Nagarajan
- Screenplay by: A. P. Nagarajan
- Story by: Veera. Palaniyappan
- Produced by: C. Paramasivam
- Starring: Sivaji Ganesan; Jayalalithaa; Padmini; K. Balaji
- Cinematography: K. S. Prasanth
- Edited by: T. R. Natarajan
- Music by: Pukazhenthi; K. V. Mahadevan (Supervisor)
- Production company: Sri Gajalakshmi Films
- Distributed by: Sivaji Productions
- Release date: 14 June 1969
- Country: India
- Language: Tamil

Gurudhakshanai (transl. Gift for the teacher) is a 1969 Indian Tamil-language drama film written and directed by A. P. Nagarajan. The film stars Sivaji Ganesan, Jayalalithaa, Padmini and K. Balaji. It was released on 14 June 1969.

== Plot ==
Kannan is an uneducated, hardworking, village farmer who is known to be quick in anger. Kanni is his lover. A teacher named Devaki comes to the village. Jealous elements start to spread rumors about Kannan and Devaki, much to the chagrin of her father. However, Devaki is already engaged to Vasudevan, whose opinion alone matters to Devaki. Kanni also trusts Kannan. In the climax, it is revealed that Kannan has been secretly getting educated with Devaki's help, unable to bear the shame of doing so in public. Vasudevan absolutely trusts Devaki even without questioning as does Kanni and everyone's doubts are cleared.

== Cast ==
- Sivaji Ganesan as Kannan
- Jayalalithaa as Kanni
- Padmini as Devaki
- K. Balaji as Vasudevan
- Major Sundarrajan as Devaki's father
- S. V. Sahasranamam as Vasudevan's father
- M. N. Nambiar as Singapur Singaram
- T. S. Balaiah as Nambothiri
- G. Sakunthala as Savithiri
- K. A. Thangavelu as Raouthar
- Manorama as Ponnathal
- T. Rama Rao as Nayar
- P. D. Sambandam as James
- T. R. Ramachandran as Mama
- Rama Prabha as Valli
- Senthamarai as Sevathan
- Pakoda Kadhar as Student
- Master Prabhakar as Vadivel

== Soundtrack ==
The music was composed by Pukazhenthi, supervised by K. V. Mahadevan, with lyrics by Kannadasan.

Songs	Singer
"Oram Kiragamadi"	T. M. Soundararajan, P. Susheela
"Athooram Maramirukku"	P. Susheela
"Ondre Ondru Ulagil"	P. Susheela
"Paru Paru Nallaparu"	Sirkazhi Govindarajan
"Kettimelam Kottavechu"	T. M. Soundararajan

== Release and reception ==
Gurudhakshaneiy was released on 14 June 1969. The Indian Express called it "a sad attempt at portraying an unlettered villager becoming not only literate but a hero capable of great sacrifice."
