= Vadivukku Valai Kappu =

- Poster
- Directed by: A. P. Nagarajan
- Written by: A. P. Nagarajan
- Produced by: A. P. Nagarajan; V. K. Ramasamy
- Starring: Sivaji Ganesan; Savitri
- Cinematography: A. Gopinath; N. A. Thara
- Edited by: T. R. Nataraj
- Music by: K. V. Mahadevan
- Production company: Sri Lakshmi Pictures
- Release date: 7 July 1962
- Country: India
- Language: Tamil

Vadivukku Valai Kappu (transl. Vadivu's baby shower) is a 1962 Indian Tamil-language film written and directed by A. P. Nagarajan in his directorial debut. The film stars Sivaji Ganesan, Savitri, and Sowcar Janaki. It was released on 7 July 1962.

== Cast ==
- Sivaji Ganesan as Kumara Vijaya Boopathy
- Savitri as Vadivu
- M. N. Rajam as Rajeswari
- V. K. Ramasamy as Mahendra Boopathy
- S. V. Subbaiah as Subban
- S. Varalakshmi as Nachiyar
- Kuladeivam Rajagopal as Nallan
- T. P. Muthulakshmi as Manthahini
- T. K. Ramachandran as Thalapathy
- Manorama

== Production ==
Vadivukku Valai Kappu marked the directorial debut of A. P. Nagarajan, who worked mostly as a screenwriter at that time. He and V. K. Ramasamy (who acted in the film) produced the film, under the banner Sri Lakshmi Pictures. K. Somu was the original director, but removed his name from the credits in favour of Nagarajan. A. Gopinath and N. A. Thara handled the cinematography, while T. R. Nataraj did the editing. Sampath-Chinni, Rajkumar, Thangaraj and Krishnaraj were in charge of choreography. A. M. Shahul Hameed provided Nagarajan financial support to complete the film, but was not credited as producer.

The film was originally started with Sivaji Ganesan and Savitri in lead roles; however it was shelved for sometime due to Savitri's pregnancy and Ganesan advised Ramasamy to revive the film with B. Saroja Devi as lead actress. When Ramasamy discussed this with Nagarajan, he was not interested with the choice as he felt they both should decide the casting. In the midst they both made Nalla Idathu Sammandham. After her pregnancy period, Savitri returned to the film, and it was restarted. The final length was 15642 feet.

== Soundtrack ==
The music of the film was composed by K. V. Mahadevan.

Song	Singer/s	Lyricist	Length
"Thilagame Ulagin Thilagame"	T. M. Soundararajan	A. Maruthakasi	05:47
"Un Manam Irangida Venum"	L. R. Eswari & group	A. Maruthakasi	
"Thaamatham Seyyaadhe Thozhi"	S. Varalakshmi	A. Maruthakasi	03:30
"Seerulaavum Inbanatham Jeeva Sangeetham"	T. M. Soundararajan & P. Susheela	A. Maruthakasi	03:18
"Saalaiyile Puliyamaram Jameenthaaru"	P. Susheela, L. R. Eswari & group	A. S. Narayanan	03:20
"Soodu Vaicha Vellai Kaalai"	Athmasha	A. S. Narayanan	
"Nilladiyo Nilladiyo Ninaichu Paarthu solladiyo"	P. Susheela	Kannadasan	03:20
"Pillai Manam Kalanguthendral"	T. M. Soundararajan	Kannadasan	
"Chillena Poothu Sirikindra Pennukku"	P. Susheela	Kannadasan	03:30

== Release and reception ==
Vadivukku Valai Kappu was released on 7 July 1962, after being delayed for over four years. The Illustrated Weekly of India stated, "The story is poor and the way in which it is told is even poorer." Kanthan of Kalki also printed a negative review, saying there was no redeemable feature except for the outdoor photography.
