= Neelavukku Neranja Manasu =

- Theatrical release poster
- Directed by: K. Somu
- Written by: A. P. Nagarajan
- Produced by: Dinshaw K. Tehrani; N. Naga Subramaniam; V. S. Venkatachalam
- Starring: T. R. Ramachandran; Sriram; Pandari Bai; M. N. Rajam
- Cinematography: Gopanna; G. Vittal Rao; W. R. Subba Rao (Gevacolor)
- Edited by: T. Vijayarangam; K. Durairaj
- Music by: K. V. Mahadevan
- Production company: Royal Films
- Release date: 26 September 1958
- Running time: 170 minutes
- Country: India
- Language: Tamil

Neelavukku Neranja Manasu (transl. Heart full Neela) is a 1958 Indian Tamil-language film directed by K. Somu. It was released on 26 September 1958.

== Cast ==
List adapted from the database of Film News Anandan and from film credits.

Male cast

- T. R. Ramachandran
- Sriram
- K. A. Thangavelu
- V. K. Ramasamy
- P. D. Sambandam
- V. M. Ezhumalai
- M. R. Santhanam
- M. E. Madhavan

Female cast

- Pandari Bai
- Ragini
- M. N. Rajam
- T. P. Muthulakshmi
- Venubai
- Baby Uma

== Production ==
The film was produced by Dinshaw K. Tehrani, N. Naga Subramaniam and V. S. Venkatachalam under the banner Royal Films. K. Somu directed the film, while A. P. Nagarajan wrote the screenplay and dialogues. Cinematography was directed by Gopanna, while the camera was handled by G. Vittal Rao and by V. R. Subba Rao (for the colour dance sequence). Dinshaw K. Tehrani was in charge of audiography, while the recordings were done by M. Loganathan. K. Vijayarangam and K. Durairaj handled the editing. Art direction was by N. Kuppusamy. Choreography was done by P. S. Gopalakrishnan, P. C. Thangaraj and Deshmand. The film was shot at Newtone studios and processed at Central Cine Laboratory.

== Soundtrack ==
Music was composed by K. V. Mahadevan.

Song	Singer/s	Lyricist
"Kannai Kavarum Kalai"	Soolamangalam Rajalakshmi	A. Maruthakasi
"Singaara Sangeethame"	Soolamangalam Rajalakshmi, Jikki & A. G. Rathnamala	A. Maruthakasi
"Cycle Varudhu Cycle Varudhu"	Thiruchi Loganathan & L. R. Eswari	A. Maruthakasi
"Otrumaiye Namakku Uyir Naadi"	Soolamangalam Rajalakshmi & Jikki	A. Maruthakasi
"Kanakku Pannuraaru Summaa"	K. Jamuna Rani	A. Maruthakasi
"Originality Uyarndha Quality"	Thiruchi Loganathan	A. S. Narayanan
"Kalviye Pradhanam"	Jikki	A.Marudhakasi
