= Anna Thangi (1958 film) =

1958 film

- VCD cover
- Directed by: K. R. Seetharama Sastry
- Screenplay by: K. R. Seetharama Sastry
- Story by: A. P. Nagarajan
- Based on: Makkalai Petra Magarasi
- Produced by: T. S. Karibasaiah
- Starring: Rajkumar; B. Saroja Devi; B. Jayamma
- Cinematography: K. Prabhakar
- Edited by: Bal G. Yadav; Thathayya
- Music by: G. K. Venkatesh
- Production company: The Girija Productions (Pvt) Ltd
- Release date: 15 April 1958
- Running time: 140 minutes
- Country: India
- Language: Kannada

Anna Thangi is a 1958 Indian Kannada-language film, directed by K. R. Seetharama Sastry and produced by T. S. Karibasaiah. The film stars Rajkumar, B. Saroja Devi, B. Jayamma, Vidyavathi and Lakshmidevi. G. K. Venkatesh composed the music. It a remake of the 1957 Tamil film Makkalai Petra Magarasi.

== Cast ==
- Rajkumar as Malla
- B. Saroja Devi as Belli
- B. Jayamma as Malla's mother
- Vidyavathi as Girija, Malla's sister
- K. S. Ashwath as Somanna Gowda
- Balakrishna as Ramachandraiah
- Narasimharaju as Kempa
- M. N. Lakshmi Devi
- M. Jayashree
- Papamma
- Shyamala
- Eshwarappa
- Ganapathi Bhat
- R. N. Magadi
- Comedian Guggu
- Vasudeva Girimaji

== Soundtrack ==
The music was composed by G. K. Venkatesh.

No.	Song	Singers	Lyrics	Length (m:ss)
1	"Bhoomigyaake Bandi Antha"	P. Nageshwara Rao	K. R. Seetharama Sastry	03:18
