= Thayapola Pillai Noolapola Selai =

1959 film directed by K. Somu

- Directed by: K. Somu
- Written by: A. P. Nagarajan
- Produced by: A. P. Nagarajan; V. K. Ramasamy
- Starring: Manohar
- Cinematography: V. K. Gopanna
- Edited by: T. Vijayarangam; K. Durairaj
- Music by: K. V. Mahadevan
- Production company: Sri Lakshmi Pictures
- Release date: 14 April 1959
- Country: India
- Language: Tamil

Thayapola Pillai Noolapola Selai (transl. A child like its mother, a sari like its thread) is a 1959 Indian Tamil-language film written and co-produced by A. P. Nagarajan and directed by K. Somu. The film stars Manohar, and was released on 14 April 1959.

== Cast ==
Cast adapted from the song book:

Male cast

- Manohar
- V. K. Ramasamy
- Sarangapani
- T. K. Ramachandran
- T. N. Sivathanu
- Sayeeram
- M. E. Madhavan
- Ramanathan
- Yadhartham Ponnusami Pillai
- S. V. Rajagopal
- Madhavan Krishnamurthi
- Sivaji Ganesan (Guest)

Female cast

- M. N. Rajam
- Pandari Bai
- P. Kannamba
- C. K. Saraswathi
- Padmini Priyadarshini
- C. T. Rajakantham
- M. S. S. Bhagyam
- Chandra
- Sivakami (Debut)

== Production ==
Thayapola Pillai Noolapola Selai was produced by V. K. Ramasamy and A. P. Nagarajan under Sri Lakshmi Pictures. Nagarajan also wrote the script, and K. Somu was the director. Cinematography was handled by V. K. Gopanna, and the editing by T. Vijayarangam and K. Durairaj.

== Soundtrack ==
The soundtrack was composed by K. V. Mahadevan and the lyrics were written by A. Maruthakasi.

Song	Singer/s	Length
"Chinna Meenai Pottaa Thaan"	K. Jamuna Rani	03:25
"Paatti Sollum Kadhai"	Seerkazhi Govindarajan, Thiruchi Loganathan, Soolamangalam Rajalakshmi & L. R. Eswari	09:24
"Naattil Kalaithondu Aatridum Penngal"	P. Susheela	03:12
"Nalla Kudumbam Miga Nalla Kudumbam"	R. Balasaraswathi Devi	03:22
"Vilai Mathippillaadha Arumporul Kalaiye"	Soolamangalam Rajalakshmi & P. Susheela	03:03
"Kaariyatthil Kannaa Irukkanum"	K. Jamuna Rani	02:51
"Sandhegam Theeraadha Viyaadhi"	Soolamangalam Rajalakshmi	03:11

== Release and reception ==
Thayapola Pillai Noolapola Selai was released on 14 April 1959. The Indian Express positively reviewed the film for its script, and the play featuring Ganesan. Kanthan of Kalki appreciated Nagarajan's writing and Somu's direction.
