= Nalla Idathu Sammandham =

- Theatrical release poster
- Directed by: K. Somu
- Screenplay by: A. P. Nagarajan
- Story by: V. K. Ramasamy
- Produced by: V. K. Ramasamy; A. P. Nagarajan
- Starring: M. R. Radha; Sowcar Janaki; Prem Nazir; M. N. Rajam
- Cinematography: V. K. Goppanna
- Edited by: T. Vijayarangam
- Music by: K. V. Mahadevan
- Production company: Sri Lakshmi Pictures
- Distributed by: Sri Lakshmi Pictures Circuit
- Release date: 16 February 1958
- Running time: 153 minutes
- Country: India
- Language: Tamil

Nalla Idathu Sammandham (transl. The good alliance) is 1958 Indian Tamil-language drama film directed by K. Somu. It was the debut production of writer A. P. Nagarajan, who co-produced the film with V. K. Ramasamy. The story was provided by Ramasamy himself, while the screenplay was written by Nagarajan. It stars M. R. Radha, Prem Nazir, Sowcar Janaki and M. N. Rajam. The film was released on 16 February 1958, became a box office success and a turning point in Radha's career.

== Plot ==
A wealthy man with a wayward son and a daughter, who is a nurse, thinks his son would change his ways if he gets married. He arranges a marriage for his son with another wealthy man's daughter, and sends the communication to his son and daughter. The wedding comes as a surprise to the son who does not intend on getting married. However, he informs his sister he will be present at the wedding ceremony. He turns up just in time to tie the mangalasutra. The young bride joins her husband with hopes of a happy marriage, but her life turns out to be sheer torture. Meanwhile, the nurse falls in love with a police officer, and soon the story takes a few turns and twists. Finally, the wayward son reforms, and all live happily.

== Cast ==
- M. R. Radha as Muthu
- Sowcar Janaki as Rathnam
- Prem Nazir as Manickam
- M. N. Rajam as Maragatham
- V. K. Ramasamy as Muthu's father
- C. K. Saraswathi
- K. Sarangapani
- Madi Lakshmi as Mohana
- V. M. Ezhumalai
- P. D. Sambandam as Rummy
- Kallapart Natarajan as Jacky

== Production ==
The film marked the production debut of A. P. Nagarajan. He co-founded a production company named "Lakshmi Pictures" with actor V. K. Ramasamy. Ramasamy provided the story, while Nagarajan wrote the screenplay and dialogues for the film. The film was shot in Madras and Salem.

Nagarajan and Ramasamy were producing Vadivukku Valai Kappu which they shelved due to Savitri's pregnancy. Nagarajan insisted Ramasamy to write a story which prompted the latter to write one which became Nalla Idathu Sambandham.

== Soundtrack ==
The film's music was composed by K. V. Mahadevan. The film established L. R. Eswari's career as a playback singer.

Song	Singer	Lyrics	Length
"Puthu Pennae"	L. R. Eswari, T. R. Kajalakshmi, G. Kasthuri and Udutha	A. S. Narayanan	03:12
"Ponnu Mappillai"	L. R. Eswari & G. Kasthuri	A. S. Narayanan	02:33
"Thukkaththil Sirikkanum"	L. R. Eswari	A. Maruthakasi	02:42
"Ivarey Thaan Avaru"	L. R. Eswari	A. Maruthakasi	02:48
"Sonnalum Ketppathillai"	Soolamangalam Rajalakshmi	A. Maruthakasi	02:36
"Jaalam Seivathum Niyaayamaa"	Soolamangalam Rajalakshmi	A. Maruthakasi	04:00

== Release and reception ==
The film was released on 16 February 1958 by Sri Lakshmi Pictures Circuit. It was reviewed by Kanthan of Kalki, and Minnal of Janasakthi.
