= Seetha (1967 film) =

1967 film by A. P. Nagarajan

- Poster
- Directed by: A. P. Nagarajan
- Screenplay by: A. P. Nagarajan
- Story by: Dharmaraj
- Starring: Gemini Ganesh; Savitri Ganesh
- Cinematography: T. S. Rangasamy
- Edited by: M. N. Rajan; T. R. Natarajan
- Music by: K. V. Mahadevan
- Production company: Rajalakshmi Pictures
- Distributed by: Crescent Movies
- Release date: 23 June 1967
- Running time: 180 minutes
- Country: India
- Language: Tamil

Seetha is a 1967 Indian Tamil-language drama film written and directed by A. P. Nagarajan. The film stars Gemini and Savitri Ganesh, the former's 100th film as an actor. It was released on 23 June 1967.

== Cast ==
- Gemini Ganesh
- Savitri Ganesh as Seetha
- Muthuraman
- Nagesh
- K. R. Vijaya as Vedha
- K. Sarangapani
- Manorama

== Production ==
Seetha was directed by A. P. Nagarajan under the banner Rajalakshmi Pictures. He also wrote its screenplay. Ganga was the art director, M. N. Rajan and T. R. Natarajan were the editors. The film was Gemini Ganesan's (credited as Gemini Ganesh) 100th as an actor. The final length of the film was 3,990 metres (13,090 ft).

== Soundtrack ==
The music was composed by K. V. Mahadevan and lyrics were written by Kannadasan.

Song	Singers	Length
"Naadi Thudikkudhu"	Seerkazhi Govindarajan & P. Susheela	04:31
"Pennukku Ragasiyam Enna"	P. Susheela	02:48
"Nalam Kaakkum Kula Dheivame"	P. Susheela & Soolamangalam Rajalakshmi	03:50
"Kaviyathin Thalaivan"	P. Susheela	03:29

== Release and reception ==
Seetha was released on 23 June 1967, and distributed by Crescent Movies. Kalki appreciated the story for lacking confusion, and the cast performances.

== Bibliography ==
- Cowie, Peter; Elley, Derek, eds. (1977). World Filmography: 1967. Fairleigh Dickinson University Press. ISBN 0-498-01565-3.
