= Akilan =

Indian writer

Akilandam
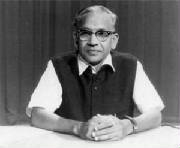
- Born: June 27, 1922; Perungalur, Pudukkottai State, British India
- Died: 1988 (aged 65–66)
- Occupations: Author, social activist, media person
- Writing career
- Pen name: Akilan
- Notable works: Chithirappavai, Vengayin Maindhan, Pavai Vilakku
- Notable awards: Sahitya Akademi Award (1963), Jnanpith Award (1975).

Akilandam (1922–1988), better known by his pen name Akilan, was an Indian writer and novelist who wrote in Tamil. He was attracted by Gandhian philosophy during his school days and he discontinued his college education at Pudukkottai to join the freedom struggle. Later, after Indian independence, he joined the Railway Mail Service, after which he joined the All India Radio and became a full-fledged writer. His stories began to appear mostly in small magazines.

He was awarded the Sahitya Academy Award and the Jnanpith Award by the Government of India for his novels Vengayin Mainthan and Chitra Pavai in 1963 and 1975 respectively.

== Early life ==
He was born on 27 June at Perungalur, Pudukkottai District. He spent his childhood in a village called Perungalur near Pudukkottai. His father Vaithiya Lingam Pillai was an accounts officer and adored his only son Akilan very much. Unfortunately, the boy lost his loving father at an early age. But his mother Amirthammal was a loving person, and being a creative person herself, she moulded her son into a writer.

== Awards won ==
In 1975 the novel Chitra Pavai won the prestigious Jnanpith Award. This work of his has been translated in all Indian languages. In 1963 his historical novel Vengayin Mainthan was awarded by Sahitya academy of Govt of India.

Enge Pogirome எங்கே போகிறோம் is a unique socio-political novel of his, won the Raja Sir Annamalai award in 1975. His children's book Kanana kannan won the special prize given by Tamil Nadu educational department. The author has written about 45 titles, most of which have been translated in all Indian state languages. Apart from this his works has been translated in other foreign languages such as English, German, Czech, Russian, Polish, Chinese, and Malay.

== Works ==
=== Historical novels ===
- Vengayin maindan This is one of the famous works of Akilan, read by thousands and thousands of Tamilians all over the globe. This historical fiction captures the history of Chola dynasty. This book was dramatised by Late.Mr.Shivaji Ganesan on stage and was a huge hit.

In this novel, Akilan gives insight about the life and achievement of the great Rajendra Chola who was a Vengaiyin Maindhan to the rest of the world. RajendraCholan is the son of Rajaraja Cholan and his period can be referred as the height of Tamil empire in art, literature and administration. He captured many countries including Indonesia, Sri Lanka, Malaysia (Kadaaram), southern and eastern coastal parts of India. He lived around 1010 AD and his dynasty had many business relationships with foreign countries. This novel depicts his victory over Kadaaram and the building of new city Gangaikonda Cholapuram upon his victory over northern part of India. The newly built temple and the city internally had so many architectural designs for war-time and peace activities. Along conquering the nations, Ilango Vel conquered the hearts of beautiful girls Arulmozhi and Rohini. Their love and affection was depicted in simple yet powerful words by Akilan. Vandhiya Thevan appears in this novel as an elderly counselor, who guides Rajendra Cholan in war and administration. This novel can also be considered as a sequel to kalki's Ponniyin Selvan. Because of the narration and depiction of historic facts during Chola period using proper language there is no wonder this novel received the Sakithya Academy Award from Government of India. (Sakithya Academy award-winning novel) Chola's historical novel

- Kayalvizhi. Tamil Nadu government award – Pandiya's historical novel-Akilan's Kayalvizhi is a gripping saga set in the Pandiya kingdom background.-Filmed by M.G.R as Madurai meeta sundarapandian.
- Vetrithirunagar- ( historical novel based on Vijayanagara Empire

=== Social novels ===
- Chitrai Pavai. A contemporary social novel written by Akilan, who vividly brings Annamalai's character to our eyes. The hero Annamalai's calm and dreamy nature surely takes our mind. The ending of this novel was highly appreciated on those days and its simply the best.- Mr. Prabhuh's Review ( Jnanpith Award-winning Tamil novel)
- Nenchin Alaigal. (Award from Tamil language development)
- Enge Pokirom? (எங்கே போகிறோம்?)
- Pen (பெண்)
- Pavai Vilaku. Filmed in Tamil by Shivaji Ganesan.
- Palmara Katinile
- Thunaivi
- Pudu Vellam
- Valvu Enge?- Filmed in Tamil as Kulamagal Radhai
- Pon Malar
- Snehithi (சிநேகிதி)
- Vanama Boomiya
- Inbaninaivu
- Avaluku

=== Short stories ===
- Akilan sirukathaigal. 2 volumes
- Kombuthen kolai karan. Short story collection.
- Thaipasu: Ajay the cow

=== Essays ===
- Nadu nam thalaivargal. Collection of powerful essays and speeches of Akilan

=== Self-improvement ===
- Vetriyin Ragasiyangal.

=== Art and literature ===
- Kathai Kalai.
- Pudiya Vilipu.

=== Autobiography ===
- Eluthum Valkayum.

=== Translation ===
- Dhagam Oscar Wilde.
- Eluthathakadai.

=== Children books ===
- Thanga Nagaram.
- Kanana Kannan.
- Nalla Payan.

=== Travelogue ===
- Malaysia singaporil akilan.

=== Short story collections ===
- Sathya Avesam
- Oorvalam.
- Erimalai.
- Pasiyum Rusiyum.
- Velyum Payirum.
- Kulanthaisirithathu.
- Sakthivel.
- Nilavinile.
- Annpenn.
- Minuvathelam.
- Valipiranthathu.
- Sagotharar Andro.
- Oruvelaisoru.
- Viduthalai.
- Neloorarisi.
- Sengarumbu.
- Yaar Thiyagi.

=== Films adapted from novels ===
- Paavai Vilakku (1960) (based on novel of same name)
- Kulamagal Radhai (1963) (based on novel Vazhvu Engey)
- Madhuraiyai Meetta Sundharapandiyan (1978) (based on novel Kayalvizhi)

=== Serials adapted from novels ===
- Chithirai Paavai (DD Podhigai) (based on novel Chithirai Paavai)

== See also ==
- List of Sahitya Akademi Award winners for Tamil
- List of Indian writers
- List of Tamil-language writers
