= Navarathri (1964 film) =

1964 film by A. P. Nagarajan

- Theatrical release poster
- Directed by: A. P. Nagarajan
- Written by: A. P. Nagarajan
- Produced by: A. P. Nagarajan
- Starring: Sivaji Ganesan; Savitri
- Cinematography: W. R. Subba Rao
- Edited by: Rajan; T. R. Natarajan
- Music by: K. V. Mahadevan
- Production company: Sri Vijayalakshmi Pictures
- Release date: 3 November 1964
- Running time: 164 minutes
- Country: India
- Language: Tamil

Navarathri (transl. Nine nights) is a 1964 Indian Tamil-language drama film written, produced and directed by A. P. Nagarajan. The film stars Sivaji Ganesan and Savithri. It was the hundredth film of Ganesan and is well known for his nine distinct roles. The film, released on 3 November 1964, became a box-office hit, with a theatrical run of 100 days. It was remade in Telugu as Navaratri (1966) and in Hindi as Naya Din Nai Raat (1974).

== Plot ==
The film opens with the narrator explaining that there are nine types of human behaviours (Navarasam) known as Wonder (Arputham), Fear (Bayam), Compassion (Karuna), Anger (Kobam), Equanimity (Saantham), Disgust (Aruvaruppu), Elegance (Singaram), Bravery (Veeram) and Bliss (Anandham) and that Sivaji Ganesan's nine roles represent one character per role. The story traces Nalina's experience of these nine emotions on nine consecutive nights.

Nalina is the only daughter of a rich man. When she happily celebrates Navaratri festival at her home with her friends, her father informs her that an arranged groom and the groom's parents will be visiting to check Nalina out for marriage. Nalina is reluctant to the proposal as she wants to marry her college mate Anand. After arguments with her father, she leaves home without her father's knowledge at the first Navaratri night.

First Night (Wonder): She searches for her lover in the college hostel, but finds that he has gone to marry someone else. Nalina feels cheated by Anand and attempts suicide, where she is stopped by a widower, Arputharaj. He takes her to his house and introduces her to his daughter. He urges her to tell her address so that he can drop her off back home safely. Unwilling to return home, she leaves the place the next early morning.

Second Night (Fear): The next day she damages the vegetables of a vendor by mistake. When the vendor fights with her, she is rescued by a homely looking woman. The woman takes Nalina to her home. Nalina meets several women in her house. But the house is a brothel house. She is closeted with a drunkard, who justifies his actions that he cannot have relations with his own wife as she is a TB patient, and that, though he does not want to betray his wife, he is not able to resist his feelings. Nalina advises and warns him, but he does not want to hear it. After much struggle, the drunkard falls onto the floor and faints. Nalina escapes from the place.

Third Night (Compassion): After escaping from the brothel house, Nalina is caught by a patrol policeman for wandering into the road at unusual time. At the police station, she pretends to be a mentally ill woman. The police admit her at a mental hospital. The old aged lonely doctor Karunaagaran understands that Nalina is fine and is merely pretending in order to escape from cops, and so he helps her. She stays in the hospital the whole night. The next morning, the Doctor finds a newspaper with a 'missing' notice and a photograph of hers. Nalina escapes while the doctor is still looking at the newspaper.

Fourth Night (Anger): Nalina misunderstands that the police jeep is coming for her. She dashes towards a man with a gun and faints. The man takes her to his place. Nalina understands that the police are not looking for her, but looking for the man as he is a killer who killed a rich businessman as a revenge for his brother's death. The gunman insists that Nalina leave. But she doesn't as she feels he is a good person and convinces him to surrender to police. In an attack, the gunman is killed by the businessman's henchmen. Nalina escapes from the place.

Fifth Night (Equanimity): Fed up with life, Nalina runs onto a track to attempt suicide. An innocent villager, looks at her and rushes to the track to save her. He takes her to his house and introduces her to his elder sister. A local priest visits their home and tells them that Nalina is possessed by a spirit in order to cheat them of money by performing some fake rituals. Nalina gets irritated by their acts and escapes that night.

Sixth Night (Disgust): Nalina meets an old aged leper, who once upon a time was a rich man. The man lost all his money in the treatment and charity (hoping that will help him from disease). He is disgusted by everyone, including his own son, who abandoned him when his money ran out. Nalina helps him by taking him to a hospital. The doctor is surprised as he is one who benefited by a medicine degree by the charity of the rich man. The doctor decides to stay with him until he is cured. Nalina leaves the hospital.

Seventh Night (Elegance): Nalina feels very tired and asks for water from a house. People offer water to her. One of the men, Sathyavaan Singaram, is a director and actor of stage plays and road side plays. Their troop had committed to stage nine plays in the village on the account of the Navaratri celebration. But the heroine had fallen sick and his whole troop are in critical position, in search of a replacement for the seventh day play, failing which will make them lose money and reputation in the village. He asks Nalina to help by acting with him for the day's play. Nalina agrees on a condition that she should be let go after the play is over. The play is successful that night. After the play, the troop's agent tries to misbehave with Nalina and the actor pulls him off and warns him. But he finds Nalina has left.

Eight Night (Bravery): Nalina disguises as a man and visits a house of a hunter Veerapan. The hunter is ostensibly hunting a man-eater. Nalina introduces herself as Nathan, a secret agent in search of a criminal. The hunter seems to believe her and gives her an earnest welcome, feast and hospitality. Nalina finds that the hunter is actually the commissioner of police in search of a criminal. She tries to escape from the place, but she is caught by the hunter.

The hunter introduces himself as the paternal uncle of the groom whom her father proposed for her and the groom is none other than her lover – Anand. Nalina has left her home before her father knew that she is in love with a person and the lover is the same man he has arranged for his daughter. Also Nalina misunderstands that Anand is going to marry another girl, but she is the girl. Nalina leaves for the Anand's place the ninth day.

Ninth Day (Bliss): Anand looks pale and dull after Nalina left her home. He is neither interested in living normally, nor in continuing with his studies. His parents are worried and scold him for wasting his life for a girl after all. Angered by this, he shuts himself into a room. Nalina reaches his home that time. Anand's parents and Nalina fear that he is attempting suicide. But suddenly the room opens and Nalina runs inside.

Anand wanted to surprise Nalina about their marriage and that is why he did not inform her about the engagement. Due to miscommunication, Nalina had left home on the first Navatri night and has come back on the ninth Navaratri night.

Anand and Nalina happily marry. Her wedding is attended by all the people she met during those days, except by the dead gunman of the fourth night.

== Cast ==
=== Main cast ===
- Sivaji Ganesan in 9 roles as:

- Arputharaj
- The Drunkard
- Dr. Karunakaran
- The Gunman
- The Villager
- The Leper
- Sathyavan Singaram
- Veerappan
- Anand

- Savithri as Nalina
- Nagesh as the village priest
- Manorama as Nalina's mentally ill friend
- Kutty Padmini as Lalitha

=== Supporting cast ===
Male cast

- K. Sarangapani as Manickam Pillai
- V. K. Ramasamy as Sundaram Pillai
- E. R. Sahadevan
- P. D. Sambandam as Drama stage Music Player
- V. Gopalakrishnan as Doctor
- Karikol Raju
- Karuppu Subbiah
- S. V. Rajagopal
- Gundu Karupaiah
- Gemini Balu
- M. Karupaiah

Male cast (Contd.)

- Krishnamoorthy
- Balu
- Chandranbabu
- S. R. Gopal
- Balasundaram
- Pasupathy
- Ramanathan
- Ganesan
- Shanmugam
- Gundumani
- Rathnam Brothers

Female cast

- T. P. Muthulakshmi as Mental Hospital Patient
- C. K. Saraswathi as Mental Hospital Patient
- C. T. Rajakantham as Mental Hospital Patient
- Kumari Rukmani as Visalakshi
- Thilakam Rajakumari
- M. S. S. Bhagyam
- Radhabai as Villager
- Devaki
- Spider Sundari
- S R Sivakami as Nalina's friend
- Seethalakshmi
- Kamakshi

== Production ==
Navarathri is Sivaji Ganesan's 100th film as an actor. At the time of release, it held the record for the most number of characters played by a single actor in an Indian film. Cinematography was handled by W. R. Subba Rao, art direction by Ch. E. Prasad Rao and editing by Rajan.

== Soundtrack ==
The music was composed by K. V. Mahadevan. The song "Iravinil Aattam" was remixed by G. V. Prakash Kumar in Kadavul Irukaan Kumaru (2016).

Song	Singer/s	Lyricist	Duration
"Navaraathiri Subha Raathiri"	P. Susheela	Kannadasan	03:34
"Sollavaa, Kadhai Sollavaa"	P. Susheela	Kannadasan	03:55
"Iravinil Aattam, Pagalinil Thookkam"	T. M. Soundararajan	Kannadasan	03:42
"Pottadhu Molaichuthadi Kannammaa"	T. M. Soundararajan	Kannadasan	03:22
"Vandha Naal Mudhal"	L. R. Eswari, K. Jamuna Rani, Soolamangalam Rajalakshmi & Anjali	Kannadasan	08:49
"Raja Raja Maha Raja Veeraprathaaban"	T. M. Soundararajan, P. Susheela & S. C. Krishnan	Sankaradas Swamigal	09:13

== Release and reception ==
Navarathri was released on 3 November 1964.Despite facing competition from Padagotti, Muradan Muthu. The Indian Express wrote on 14 November, "Director APN, with deft, imaginative touches that alternate with crudity and mere melodrama makes what might have been an outstanding picture just a good entertainer". Writing for Kalki, P. Kannan said the film could be watched multiple times of the performances of Ganesan and Savitri. Ananda Vikatan also printed a favourable review, saying it could be watched more than once.

== Legacy ==
Following Ganesan's death in 2001, BBC News named Navarathri as one of his best films. Malathi Rangarajan of The Hindu wrote in 2007, " At a time when playing even three roles in a film was a wonder, you saw an actor handling nine with élan! And each was so different from the other that you almost forgot it was the same man playing all the parts".
