= Kulamagal Radhai =

1963 film by A. P. Nagarajan

- Theatrical release poster
- Directed by: A. P. Nagarajan
- Screenplay by: A. P. Nagarajan
- Based on: Vaazhvu Engey by Akilan
- Starring: Sivaji Ganesan; B. Saroja Devi; Devika
- Cinematography: W. R. Subba Rao
- Edited by: K. Durairaj
- Music by: K. V. Mahadevan
- Production company: Spider Films
- Release date: 7 June 1963
- Country: India
- Language: Tamil

Kulamagal Radhai (transl. Radhai, the homely one) is a 1963 Indian Tamil-language romance film directed and written by A. P. Nagarajan. It is based on the novel Vaazhvu Engey (transl. Where is life?) by Akilan. The film stars Sivaji Ganesan, B. Saroja Devi and Devika. It was released on 7 June 1963.

== Plot ==
Radhai is in love with Chandran and they decide to elope and get married. Radhai is persuaded by her sister-in-law, Vanaja, not to run away from home, which makes Chandran feel betrayed.

== Cast ==
- Sivaji Ganesan as Chandran
- B. Saroja Devi as Radhai
- Devika as Leela

Supporting actors

- R. S. Manohar as Natarajan
- K. Sarangapani as Sambhamoorthy
- V. K. Ramasamy as Leela's father
- T. K. Bhagavathi as Sundaresan
- T. N. Sivadhaanu as Aarumugam
- P. D. Sambandam as a circus man

Supporting actresses

- P. Kannamba as Kamalam
- R. Sandhya as Vanaja
- Manorama as Muthamma

== Production ==
- Kulamagal Radhai directed by A. P. Nagarajan, who also wrote the screenplay, and produced by Spider Films.
- It is based on the novel Vaazhvu Engey, by Akilan. Cinematography was handled by W. R. Subba Rao, and the editing by K. Durairaj.
- In the final scene of this movie will take place Sivaji Ganesan was supposed to kick Sarojadevi on the shoulder in a fit of anger; however, he slipped, and his foot struck her in the stomach instead, causing her to fall heavily to the ground.
- Realizing what had happened and concerned about the impact of the kick, Sivaji Ganesan immediately asked director A. P. Nagarajan to summon a doctor. But Saroja devi laughed as she got up and told Sivaji, "I don't need a doctor, Ganesh; your foot has just done the job the doctor was supposed to do for me." When Sivaji and Nagarajan looked at her in confusion, wondering what she meant, she explained that she had been suffering from severe gas pain in her stomach for a couple of days—pain that hadn't subsided despite taking various medicines.
- She added that the kick Ganesh had delivered to her stomach had effectively cured her gas trouble. Hearing this, everyone on the set—Sivaji Ganesan, A. P. Nagarajan, and Devika—burst into laughter.
- After Sarojadevi declined the need for a doctor, the scene was filmed again, this time correctly, with Sivaji Ganesan kicking her on the shoulder and causing her to fall.
- Later, Sivaji Ganesan asked Saroja Devi about the sensation of the accidental kick. She jokingly remarked, "You know the saying about an elephant trampling Bharati's stomach? It felt exactly like that." Director A. P. Nagarajan, who was nearby, playfully elaborated on the literary analogy: "Yes, in this context, 'Bharati' represents " Abhinaya Saraswathi " (Sarojadevi), and the 'Elephant'—or " Aanaimugan "—represents Sivaji Ganesan."

== Soundtrack ==
The music was composed by K. V. Mahadevan.

Song	Singers	Lyrics	Length
"Aruyire Manavare"	P. Susheela	Kannadasan	03.23
"Iravukku Aayiram"	P. Susheela	Kannadasan	03.11
"Kalla Malar"	P. Susheela	A. Maruthakasi	03.14
"Pagaliley Chandiranai"	P. Susheela	Kannadasan	03.20
"Chandranai Kanamal"	T. M. Soundararajan, P. Susheela	Kannadasan	3:28
"Radhe Unakku"	T. M. Soundararajan	A. Maruthakasi	02.52
"Ulagam Ethiley Adagud"	T. M. Soundararajan	Kannadasan	03.30
"Unnai Solli Kutramillai"	T. M. Soundararajan	Kannadasan	03.32

== Release and reception ==
Kulamagal Radhai was released on 7 June 1963. In Sport and Pastime, T. M. Ramachandran called the film "above average", praising Nagarajan's direction, the cast performances and the music but criticising Nagarajan for having made compromises to make the film commercially viable. Kanthan of Kalki wrote.
