= Thillana Mohanambal =

1968 film by A. P. Nagarajan

- Theatrical release poster
- Directed by: A. P. Nagarajan
- Screenplay by: A. P. Nagarajan
- Based on: Thillana Mohanambal by Kothamangalam Subbu
- Produced by: A. P. Nagarajan
- Starring: Sivaji Ganesan; Padmini; T. S. Balaiah
- Cinematography: K. S. Prasanth
- Edited by: M. N. Rajan; T. R. Natarajan
- Music by: K. V. Mahadevan
- Production company: Sri Vijayalakshmi Pictures
- Release date: 27 July 1968
- Running time: 175 minutes
- Country: India
- Language: Tamil

Thillana Mohanambal (transl. The Dancing Queen Mohanambal) is a 1968 Indian Tamil-language romantic musical dance film written, directed and produced by A. P. Nagarajan. The film stars Sivaji Ganesan, Padmini and T. S. Balaiah, with A. V. M. Rajan, Nagesh and Manorama in supporting roles. It tells the story of Shanmugasundaram, a nadaswaram (Note: The Nadaswaram is a wind instrument similar to the North Indian Shehnai but much longer, with a hardwood body and a large flaring bell made of wood or metal.) player who falls in love with Mohanambal, a Bharatanatyam dancer. She reciprocates his feelings, but unfortunate circumstances and their egoistic nature prevents them from confessing their love for one another. How they overcome their self-created obstacles and those created by the people around them forms the rest of the story.

The film was adapted from Kothamangalam Subbu's novel of the same name, which was serialised in the Tamil magazine Ananda Vikatan in 1957–58. The film was mostly shot in Thanjavur, Thiruvarur and Madurai. Its original soundtrack was composed by K. V. Mahadevan, and songs like "Nalandhana", "Maraindhirundhu" and "Pandian Naanirukka" became immensely popular among the Tamil diaspora.

Thillana Mohanambal was released on 27 July 1968. Critically acclaimed for subtly portraying the socio-cultural environment and the Thanjavur culture of dance and music prevailing at that time, it was also a commercial success, with a theatrical run of over 175 days. The film won two National Film Awards — Best Feature Film in Tamil (President's silver medal) and Best Cinematography — and five Tamil Nadu State Film Awards. Thillana Mohanambal has since acquired cult status in Tamil cinema, and inspired several later films with similar themes of music and dance.

== Plot ==
"Sikkal" Shanmugasundaram is a devoted nadaswaram player, but is short-tempered and sensitive. He meets Mohanambal, a Bharatanatyam dancer, and they fall in love with each other. Sundaram's ego prevents him from developing his relationship with Mohana, who asks him to play a Thillana on his nadaswaram while she dances. Mohana's mother Vadivambaal, an influential but greedy woman, wants her daughter to marry a wealthy man so that she can settle down in life properly. Blinded by love, she disobeys Vadivambaal, creating a rift between them.

Unaware of Mohana's feelings, Sundaram decides to leave the country along with Karuppayi, a folk dancer whom he considers to be his sister. Mohana calls him a coward and challenges him to stay, which he readily accepts. In a temple, Sundaram plays the Thillana and Mohana dances. Sundaram, impressed with Mohana's performance, bestows upon her the title of "Thillana Mohanambal". Suddenly Nagalingam, a landlord who wanted to marry Mohana, stabs Sundaram with a poisoned knife out of jealousy.

Sundaram is admitted to a hospital but recovers from the incident with the help of Mary, a nurse who works there. Later, he and Mohana meet in a concert programme where they perform, against Vadivambal's wishes. For his personal gains, "Savadal" Vaithi, a cunning man, befriends the Maharaja of Madhanpur, who is the programme's chief guest. Vaithi promises to make Mohana the Maharaja's mistress. Vaithi traps Mohana by telling her that the Maharaja has invited nadaswaram and Bharatanatyam performers to perform in his palace, and that Sundaram has also decided to attend. Mohana immediately accepts the offer and the two visit Madhanpur. Vaithi treats Sundaram's group badly and Sundaram decides to leave. He sees Mohana visiting the Maharaja's room.

The Maharaja asks Mohana to be his mistress. but she rejects his advances and is rescued by the Maharaja's wife, the Maharani. Sundaram decides that Mohana does not love him, despite her repeated denial of the Maharaja's offer. Depressed, Mohana runs away. The Maharaja reveals the truth to Sundaram that Mohana had refused his offer and she only loves Sundaram. Realising his mistake, Sundaram rushes to apologise to Mohana, but sees her trying to hang herself from the ceiling of a room in which she had locked herself. He screams to her to stop and promises he will never doubt her love again. Sundaram breaks the door and saves Mohana. They then get married with Vadivambaal's approval. Vaithi is arrested for his crimes.

== Cast ==
Male cast

- Sivaji Ganesan as Nadaswara Chakravarthi "Sikkal" Shanmugasundaram (Sundaram)
- T. S. Balaiah as Muthurakku
- A. V. M. Rajan as Thangarathnam
- K. Balaji as "Singapuram Minor" Chelladurai
- M. N. Nambiar as the Maharaja of Madhanpur
- Nagesh as "Savadal" Vaithi / Vaithiyanathan Iyer
- K. A. Thangavelu as Nattuvanar Muthukumara Swamy
- T. R. Ramachandran as Varathan
- V. Nagayya as Sundaram's Nadaswaram teacher
- S. V. Sahasranamam as a Saint living in Thiruvarur
- K. Sarangapani as Sakthivel
- E. R. Sahadevan as 'Minor' Nagalingam
- A. Karunanidhi as Sudalai
- P. D. Sambandam as a Thaalam player in Sundaram's troupe
- Senthamarai as Kadambavanam

Female cast

- Padmini as Mohanambal (Mohana)
- Manorama as Karuppayi / "Jil Jil" Ramamani / Roja Rani
- Ambika as Ashalata Devi, Queen of Madhanpur
- C. K. Saraswathi as Vadivambal, Mohana's mother
- M. Saroja as Abaranji Vethalai Petti
- Udaya Chandrika as Maragatham, Singapuram Minor’s Wife
- M. Bhanumathi as Mary
- Shanmugasundari as a Veena player in Mohana's troupe

Male support cast

- S. Rama Rao, M. K. Moorthy, Kallapart Natarajan, Balasundaram,
  T. N. Sivathanu, Chandranbabu, S. R. Dhasarathan,
  S. V. Rajagopal, Siva Sooriyan, and A. M. Maruthappa.

== Production ==
=== Development ===
Thillana Mohanambal was a novel written by Kothamangalam Subbu under the pseudonym "Kalaimani". It was serialised in the Tamil magazine Ananda Vikatan in 1957–58. The story portrayed the relationship between Mohanambal, a celebrated dancer, and Shanmugasundaram, a nadaswaram musician. The illustrations for the novel were done by sketch artist and cartoonist, Gopulu.

S. S. Vasan, who held the rights to the book, twice refused to allow director A. P. Nagarajan to make a film adaptation of it because Vasan wanted to produce a film adaptation himself under his banner Gemini Studios. When Nagarajan approached him for the third time, Vasan gave him the rights without any consideration. Nagarajan paid Vasan ₹25,000 (about US$3,300 in 1968), (Note: The exchange rate in 1968 was 7.57 Indian rupees (₹) per 1 US dollar (US$).) but also went to visit Subbu with an additional ₹10,000 (about US$1,300 in 1968). Subbu declined the money, saying that Vasan had forwarded him the money Nagarajan had paid earlier. Nagarajan's version of the film had a few creative differences from the novel; one of the significant ones was where the film ended with Mohana and Shanmugasundaram's marriage while the novel, in contrast, had a tragic ending.

Nagarajan produced the film under his production company, Sri Vijayalakshmi Pictures. K. S. Prasad was in charge of the film's cinematography, M. N. Rajan and T. R. Natarajan jointly handled the editing, and Ganga was the film's art director. R. Rangasamy was lead actor Sivaji Ganesan's make-up artist.

=== Casting ===
Padmini was cast as Mohanambal, the title character. A younger artist was suggested instead of Padmini for the role, but Nagarajan refused to replace her. Ganesan attended Carnatic music concerts, and consulted Carnatic musicians in preparation for his role. T. S. Balaiah portrayed Muthurakku, the Thavil player. Tiruvidaimarudur Venkatesan played the instrument thavil off-screen for Balaiah. Balaiah had additional training for playing the instrument. Madurai T. Srinivasan played the Mridangam off-screen for the song "Maraindhirundhe Paarkum".

A. V. M. Rajan portrayed Thangarathnam, the second nadaswaram player in Sundaram's troupe. According to playwright Crazy Mohan, Gopulu's caricature of the character Vaithi in Subbu's novel was similar to Nagesh, who portrayed Vaithi in the film. Nagesh, in an article published in Kalki in 2004, revealed that Subbu initially created the character of Vaidhi with himself in mind. Manorama, who played the folk dancer Karuppayi alias Jil Jil Ramamani, stated that she was initially nervous acting in front of Ganesan and Balaiah, but Nagarajan assured her that whenever her character appeared she would be the centre of attention, which gave her the confidence to play her role.

Serial and theatre artist M. L. Bhanumathi played the nurse who treats Shanmugasundaram. Other supporting actors included K. Sarangapani, S. Ramarao, M. K. Murthy, Balusundaram, T. N. Sivadhanu, S. R. Dasarathan, Sivasooriyan, Senthamarai, Kallapart Natarajan, Gundu Karuppaiah, Chandranbabu, S. V. Rajagopal, A. M. Maruthappa, Udayachandrika, Ambika and Kalpalatha.

=== Filming ===
We were happy but felt very nervous as we had very little film experience [...] Sivaji Ganesan listened to us lying on Kannadasan's lap. After a three-hour performance they showered ‘sabashs' and then director APN confirmed our selection for the film.

— M. P. N. Ponnusamy on his inclusion in the film along with his brother, M. P. N. Sethuraman.

Thillana Mohanambal, shot in Eastmancolor, was filmed in Thanjavur, Thiruvarur and Madurai, in the Cauvery delta. Many of the film's aesthetics were borrowed from Indian theatre, of which Nagarajan was an artist. The competition sequence between Ganesan and Padmini took about nine takes to be filmed. The film presented a mise-en-scène feel, mostly using frontal shots. The actors were lined up to face the camera and deliver their dialogue. Nagarajan, a former employee of the T. K. S. drama company, paid tribute to Shankardas Swamigal—from whom the company had its ancestral roots—by naming a drama company in the film after the company's name. Snippets of the film's behind-the-scenes production were filmed by French film director Louis Malle as a part of his 378-minute, seven-part documentary series, L'Inde fantôme: Reflexions sur un voyage (1969), when he visited Madras (now Chennai).

As Sundaram, Ganesan did not actually play the Nadaswaram; he moved his fingers on the surface of the instrument, held his breath intermittently, and created an illusion on the screen with his facial expressions. The Nadaswaram played by Sundaram and Thangarathnam was played off-screen by the brothers, M. P. N. Sethuraman and M. P. N. Ponnusamy. Nagarajan had seen the duo performing at a wedding reception in Karaikudi and asked them to come to Chennai. Their rehearsals took place over 15 days in Mahadevan's recording studio in Chennai. Nagarajan then listened to a radio recital by the duo, and was impressed with their rendition of Tyagaraja's Keerthana, "Nagumomu Ganaleni". The Keerthana was later selected as one of the soundtrack instrumentals in the film.

The film shows the traditions exhibited by courtesans, zamindars in coaches drawn by horses, and palaces that resembled 19th century architecture. The contemporary areas of Madurai and Thanjavur, especially their railway junctions, gave the film a sense of ambiguity that was then very common in Tamil cinema. The film recreated the manner in which the Devadasis were portrayed in the early 20th century, and also depicts the social conditions and the upper class milieu in Thanjavur. Real locations were mixed with the fictional town of Madhanpur. The film also had undertones of the Chithirai festival. Its final length was 4,825 m (15,830 ft).

== Music ==
The film's soundtrack and score were composed by K. V. Mahadevan, while the lyrics were written by Kannadasan. The instrumental pieces "English Notes" and "Nadaswaram Bit" were originally composed by Muthiah Bhagavatar. After performing them at Ganesan's 42nd birthday celebrations, Ponnusamy and Sethuraman were asked to play them in the film. "Maraindhirundhu" was based on Shanmukhapriya raga. It is said that the director insisted on this raga, as the heroine is someone who falls in love with the hero whose name is Shanmugasundaram, and hence the raga whose name translates to "Adorer of Shanmukha". "Nalandhana" was based on Nilamani raga, which closely resembles Shivaranjani raga. The first line of "Nalandhana" was later used in the film Silambattam (2008). Under Mahadevan's supervision, Pugazhendi set the Sangatis (Note: Sangatis are pre-composed variations in a composition and rendered in a disciplined manner (as opposed to variations born from free improvisation).) for the film's soundtrack and score.

Singer Charulatha Mani wrote for The Hindu on "Nalandhana" that, " ... one can feel the proximity in musicality. The Thavil beats, Nadaswara refrains and the honeyed voice all blend into an inviting melody composed by K.V. Mahadevan." For "Maraindhirundhu" she said, "The nadaswaram and thavil back-ups for this song and the jathi-s give it its typical classical flavour. 'Thooyane mayavaa mayane velava ennai aalum Shanmuga vaa' – these lines represent the ideal confluence of raga, bhava and lyric, a perfect foil to each other." According to film critic Randor Guy, "Nalandhana" became "one of the memorable song sequences with Sivaji Ganesan and AVM Rajan, playing the [Nadaswaram] on screen". He added, "In one song, the famous Tyagaraja kriti in Abheri, ‘Nagumomu Kanaleni’, Balaiah played the thavil in excellent sync with the background song that was recorded earlier in the studio, revealing how adept he really was with the instrument".

Track listing
No.	Title	Singer(s)	Length
1.	"Band Music"	Instrumental	04:48
2.	"Maraindhirundhu"	P. Susheela	05:11
3.	"Pandian Naanirukka"	L. R. Eswari, S. C. Krishnan	03:18
4.	"Thillana" (Nadaswaram)	Instrumental	03:45
5.	"Nagumomu Ganaleni" (Nadaswaram)	Instrumental	05:21
6.	"Nalandhana"	P. Susheela	05:11
7.	"Nadaswaram Bit"	M. P. N. Ponnusamy, M. P. N. Sethuraman	01:25
8.	"English Notes" (Vaithi Dance Sequence)	Instrumental	00:59
Total length:			29:58

== Release ==
Thillana Mohanambal was released on 27 July 1968. It was released with English subtitles in overseas countries. The film was shown for six weeks at theatres in Pondicherry, and ran for 100 days in Ganesan's family-owned Shanti Theatre in Chennai. It also completed 100-day runs in theatres in Kovai, Madurai and Trichy, and was eventually shown for over 175 days.

Thillana Mohanambal was screened in Chennai on 21 April 2010 at the South Indian Film Chamber Theatre for the Dignity Film Festival. In November 2011, it was shown at the International Tamil Film Festival held in Uglich, Russia, alongside Chandramukhi (2005), Sivaji: The Boss (2007), Angadi Theru (2010), Boss Engira Bhaskaran (2010), Thenmerku Paruvakaatru (2010) and Ko (2011).

== Reception ==
The film received critical acclaim in India and abroad for its song and dance sequences, humour and portrayal of the prevailing socio-cultural milieu at that time. The Tamil magazine Ananda Vikatan carried an 11-page review of Thillana Mohanambal with a discussion among several prominent people, which included IAS officers, professors and actors who unanimously appreciated the film and the people associated with it. The review's conclusion was that the director should be given a prize for making such a film. In its original review, The Hindu said the film "encompasses all the traditional wealth of the culture of [Tamil Nadu]." The magazine Screen called the film "a brilliantly made entertainer". Dina Thanthi wrote "Not one would not have been mesmerized by the "Thillana" dance sequence".

In 2011, film historian S. Theodore Baskaran criticised Thillana Mohanambal for depicting a Tamil king as wearing a Marathi costume: "The film-makers completely neglect the aspects of dress, jewels and weapons that are depicted in our sculptures. They do not even do basic research."

== Accolades ==
Award	Ceremony	Category	Recipient(s)	Outcome	Ref.
National Film Awards	16th National Film Awards	Best Feature Film in Tamil – President's Silver Medal	A. P. Nagarajan	Won	
National Film Awards	16th National Film Awards	Best Cinematography	K. S. Prasad	Won	
Tamil Nadu State Film Awards	Tamil Nadu State Film Awards – 1968	Best Film (second prize)	A. P. Nagarajan	Won	
Tamil Nadu State Film Awards	Tamil Nadu State Film Awards – 1968	Best Story Writer	Kothamangalam Subbu	Won	
Tamil Nadu State Film Awards	Tamil Nadu State Film Awards – 1968	Best Actress	Padmini	Won	
Tamil Nadu State Film Awards	Tamil Nadu State Film Awards – 1968	Best Character Artiste (Male)	T. S. Balaiah	Won	
Tamil Nadu State Film Awards	Tamil Nadu State Film Awards – 1968	Best Character Artiste (Female)	Manorama	Won	

== Legacy ==
Thillana Mohanambal became a cult film for bringing the traditional arts of South India into prominence and achieving more popularity than the novel. It became a landmark film for Sivaji Ganesan. Padmini's titular role become so iconic that the film was identified as her pièce de résistance. She considered Thillana Mohanambal to be the best film of her career. The film is notable for catapulting Manorama to stardom. A dialogue, "Enakku anga oru beeda kadai kaarana theriyum" (I know a paan shop owner there), which was spoken by Balaiah, became popular. According to the 2010 book Anna: The Life and Times of C.N. Annadurai by R. Kannan, C. N. Annadurai's sister's granddaughter, Kanmani, would enquire about his well-being during his last days by singing "Nalamdhana".

The film became a trendsetter and inspired several later films with similar themes of music and dance – including Karakattakkaran (1989), Sangamam (1999), and Kaaviya Thalaivan (2014). In July 2007, S. R. Ashok Kumar of The Hindu asked eight Tamil film directors to list their all-time favourite Tamil films; four of them – C. V. Sridhar, K. Balachander, Mahendran and K. Bhagyaraj – named Thillana Mohanambal. Actress Kavitha Nair, who made her debut with Mudhal Idam (2011), changed her screen name to Mohana because she liked the character. Crazy Mohan stated that the film made his top ten list, and that there was "excellence in all aspects – screenplay, dialogue, comedy, casting, music and direction. A winning combination, indeed. This gives Thillana Mohanambal its timeless appeal". Screenwriter-director Viji of Velli Thirai (2008) fame noted how the film showcased the culture of Thanjavur and that the acting performances and film formed a "complete package". Politician and writer M. Karunanidhi called it his favourite film and that he "had watched it innumerable times."

The prints of the film in 16 mm format were acquired by the American Cultural Association for their archives to represent quintessential old-world Thanjavur culture, and by universities in the United States for the study of Bharatanatyam and Nadaswaram arts in particular. Thillana Mohanambal is included with other Sivaji Ganesan-starrers in 8th Ulaga Adhisayam Sivaji, a compilation DVD featuring Ganesan's "iconic performances in the form of scenes, songs and stunts" which was released in May 2012. Although film distributor Shanthi Chokkalingam stated in February 2012 that Thillana Mohanambal's remaining prints were "totally damaged", Pradeep Sebastian of Deccan Herald stated in April 2015 that he "recently" saw the film through a restored print. Jil Jil Ramamani became immensely popular; in its obituary for Manorama, The Hindu noted Jil Jil Ramamani "probably bore the closest resemblance to Manorama" in terms of being able to perform Karakattam and Poikkal Kuthirai.

== In popular culture ==
Thillana Mohanambal has been parodied and referenced in many films. In a comedy scene from Karakattakkaran, Senthil would be playing the nadheswaram, while Kovai Sarala would be dancing and an onlooker compares them to Ganesan and Padmini's characters from the film, resulting in Goundamani becoming irked by the comment. The Times of India compared Karakattakkaran to Thillana Mohanambal because in both films, the male and female lead characters are in love with each other, despite being professional rivals. In the film Villu Pattukaran (1992), Goundamani asks Senthil to play "Nalandhana" on his thavil, resulting in a comical argument between the two. In Muthu (1995), the title character (Rajinikanth), in a conversation with Malayasimman (Sarath Babu), says that Ambalarathar's (Radha Ravi) daughter, Padmini (Subhashri) looks like actress Padmini's character, Mohana, in the film.

When Kuzhandaivelu (Vadivelu) is injured in Middle Class Madhavan (2001), his mother-in-law (Revathi Sankaran) sings "Nalandhana" while enquiring about his health. In Perazhagan (2004), when hunchback Chinna (Suriya) talks about improving his looks, Kuzhandaisamy (Vivek) jokes that if Chinna was given a party horn to play with, he would look like 'Sikkal' Shanmugasundaram. Scenes from Thillana Mohanambal were parodied in Tamizh Padam (2010). The film's poster depicts lead actor Shiva as Ganesan's character, Shanmugasundaram and M. S. Bhaskar as Balaiah's character, Muthurakku.

== Bibliography ==
- Baskaran, S. Theodore (2013) [1996]. The eye of the serpent: an introduction to Tamil cinema. Westland Books. ISBN 978-9383260744.
- Chaitanya Deva, Bigamudre (1995). Indian Music. Taylor & Francis. ISBN 978-8122407303.
- Dhananjayan, G. (2011). The Best of Tamil Cinema, 1931 to 2010: 1931 to 1976. Galatta Media.
- Ganesan, Sivaji; Narayanaswami, T. S. (2007). Autobiography of an Actor: Sivaji Ganesan, October 1928 – July 2001. Sivaji Prabhu Charities Trust.
- Kannan, R. (2010). Anna: The Life and Times of C.N. Annadurai. India: Penguin Books. ISBN 978-0-670-08328-2.
- Ashokamitran (2002). My Years with Boss at Gemini Studios. Orient Blackswan. ISBN 978-8125020875.
- Rajadhyaksha, Ashish; Willemen, Paul (1998) [1994]. Encyclopaedia of Indian Cinema. Oxford University Press. ISBN 0-19-563579-5.
- Southern, Nathan (2006). The Films of Louis Malle: A Critical Analysis. McFarland & Company. ISBN 978-0-7864-6440-1.
- Subramanian, Lakshmi (2008). New Mansions for Music: Performance, Pedagogy and Criticism. Berghahn Books. ISBN 978-8187358343.
