= A. Karunanidhi =

Indian actor and comedian

- Karunanidhi in Veerapandiya Kattabomman (1959)
- Born: 1923; Thiruvarur, British India
- Died: 1981 (aged 57–58); Chennai
- Occupation: Actor
- Spouse: A. Swarajayam
- Children: 3 daughters and one son
- Parent: father - Mr. Harikrishna

A. Karunanidhi (Tamil : கருணாநிதி) was an Indian actor and comedian who featured mainly in Tamil-language films.

== Career ==
He was active in the field from 1948 till 1978. Though he was a comedian, the roles he played in some of the films were imperative to the story, one example being his role in the award-winning film Veerapandiya Kattabomman. He featured as "Sundaralingam", a servant in Kattabomman's court. The role was developed into a spy and he played it brilliantly. In some of the films, he will not talk much, but his body language itself will make the audience laugh, as in Missiamma. He has also appeared in women's attire in some films. The turning and twisting of his body was well appreciated even by women. In Adhey Kangal (1967 film), he did the role of a Malayalee cook and spoke Malayalee Tamil, making the audience laugh to their hilt. Apart from acting, at times he gave ideas for comedy scenes in films.

T. P. Muthulakshmi was his co-star in many films.

While he was acting in films, he ran a non-vegetarian hotel called Maamiya Hotel at Thiyagaraya Nagar in Chennai.

He died in 1981, affected by diabetes.

== Partial filmography ==
Year	Film	Role
1948	Adhithan Kanavu	
1950	Digambara Samiyar	Manickam
1950	Ponmudi	
1950	Manthiri Kumari	Bhoopalam
1951	Devaki	Govindhan
1951	Sarvadhikari	Vairagyam
1952	Kalyani	
1952	Valaiyapathi	
1954	En Magal	
1954	Mangalyam	
1954	Padmini	
1955	Asai Anna Arumai Thambi	Karuppu
1955	Gulebagavali	
1955	Guna Sundari	Eldest son-in-law
1955	Kalyanam Seydhukko	
1955	Kathanayaki	
1955	Maheswari	
1955	Missiamma	Pandiya
1955	Mullaivanam	
1955	Nalla Thangai	
1955	Pennarasi	
1955	Town Bus	Mannaru (Velu's Friend)
1956	Kannin Manigal	
1956	Naan Petra Selvam	Arivumathi
1956	Paasavalai	
1957	Miss Mary (Hindi)	Karunanidhi
1957	Ambikapathi	Vengayam
1957	Aaravalli	Naaman
1957	Manamagan Thevai	
1957	Mahadhevi	Muthupulavan
1958	Boologa Rambai	Mahodharan
1958	Kadan Vaangi Kalyaanam	Drama artiste
1958	Petra Maganai Vitra Annai	Duttan (Villalan's friend)
1958	Sarangadhara	
1958	Thedi Vandha Selvam	
1959	Alli Petra Pillai	
1959	Engal Kuladevi	Chanakiyan
1959	Kan Thiranthathu	Chadaiyan
1959	Pennkulathin Ponvilakku	
1959	Veerapandiya Kattabomman	Sundaralingam
1960	Aadavantha Deivam	Kambodhi
1960	Adutha Veettu Penn	
1960	Deivapiravi	Nair
1960	Ellorum Innaattu Mannar	
1960	Pudhiya Padhai	
1961	Kappalottiya Thamizhan	Unnarsamy
1961	Palum Pazhamum	
1961	Panam Panthiyile	
1961	Thirudathe	Makku Maamaa
1962	Indira En Selvam	Compounder Kailasam
1962	Padithal Mattum Podhuma	servant of Rao Bahadur
1962	Thendral Veesum	
1963	Kalyaniyin Kanavan	Police Constable
1963	Konjum Kumari	Mannaru (Alli's uncle)
1963	Paar Magaley Paar	Manickam
1963	Thulasi Maadam	
1964	Chitrangi	
1964	Muradan Muthu	
1965	Thiruvilaiyadal	
1966	Madras to Pondicherry	Naidu (Bus Driver)
1966	Mahakavi Kalidas	
1966	Mani Magudam	Ulagappan, Vanchi's brother
1966	Sadhu Mirandal	Passenger (Cinema Makeup artiste; Special Appearance)
1967	Aalayam	
1967	Athey Kangal	
1967	Penn Endral Penn	
1968	Lakshmi Kalyanam	
1968	Thillana Mohanambal	Ottu player
1968	Thirumal Perumai	Nattamai
1969	Ponnu Mappillai	Thazhamuthu
1970	Paadhukaappu	
1970	Enga Mama	Sudden Break Shanmugam
1971	Aathi Parasakthi	
1971	Babu	Siluvai
1971	Deivam Pesuma	
1976	Ore Thanthai	
1978	Thyagam	
1980	Anbukku Naan Adimai	Head Constable
