= Makkalai Petra Magarasi =

- Theatrical release poster
- Directed by: K. Somu
- Written by: A. P. Nagarajan
- Produced by: V. K. Ramasamy; A. P. Nagarajan
- Starring: Sivaji Ganesan; P. Bhanumathi
- Cinematography: V. K. Gopal
- Edited by: T. Vijayarangam; K. Durai
- Music by: K. V. Mahadevan
- Production company: Sri Lakshmi Pictures
- Distributed by: Sivaji Films
- Release date: 27 February 1957
- Running time: 136 minutes
- Country: India
- Language: Tamil

Makkalai Petra Magarasi (transl. The Mother of Children) is a 1957 Indian Tamil-language film directed by K. Somu and written by A. P. Nagarajan, who produced it with V. K. Ramasamy. The film stars Sivaji Ganesan and P. Bhanumathi. It was released on 27 February 1957. The film was remade in Kannada as Anna Thangi (1958).

== Plot ==
In a village in Coimbatore district, Sengodan is a naïve good-hearted farmer, who knows no God other than his mother Angamma. Staying back in the hamlet and tilling his land, he sends his beloved sister Thangam to a college in town. Angamma's brother is an avaricious landowner in the same village. The two families have not been on speaking terms ever since Angamma's husband ran away when he failed to meet the unreasonable demands of his brother-in-law after having borrowed some money from him. Kannan, the villain's son, however does not inherit his father's wily characteristics. Studying in the same college, Kannan and Thangam fall in love with each other. The storm which breaks out when the warring families become aware of their love and how the lovers unite finally fill the rest of the reels. In the midst of these chaotic proceedings there is also another love story between the brave and mischievous belle Rangamma and the shy Sengodan.

== Cast ==
- Sivaji Ganesan as Sengodan
- P. Bhanumathi as Rangamma
- P. Kannamba as Angamma
- M. N. Nambiar as Kannan
- M. N. Rajam as Thangam
- V. K. Ramasamy as Pannaiyar / Kannan's father
- K. Sarangapani as Rangamma's father
- E. R. Sahadevan as Mayandi
- P. D. Sambandam as Kaaduvetti Kanakkupillai
- V. M. Ezhumalai as Pavala malai
- T. P. Muthulakshmi as Pavayee
- C. T. Rajakantham as Akhilandam
- M. R. Santhanam

== Production ==
Makkalai Petra Magarasi was the first film to be produced by actor V. K. Ramasamy and director A. P. Nagarajan (who worked mostly as a screenwriter at that time) under their then newly formed production company Sri Lakshmi Pictures.

== Soundtrack ==
The music composed by K. V. Mahadevan. The song "Manapaarai Maadu Katti" is set to the Sindhu Bhairavi raga.

Song	Singers	Lyrics	Length
"Manapaarai Maadu Katti"	T. M. Soundararajan	A. Maruthakasi	03:25
"Sonna Pechcha Kekkanum"	P. Bhanumathi	A. Maruthakasi	03:29
"Vandhadhu Yaarunu"	P. Bhanumathi	A. Maruthakasi	02:50
"Makkalai Petra Maharasi"	Jikki	A. Maruthakasi	02:00
"Seemaikku Poi Padichchavaru"	S. C. Krishnan & A. P. Komala	A. Maruthakasi	04:08
"Senthazham Poovai Poi"	K. Jamuna Rani & A. G. Rathnamala	A. Maruthakasi	03:01
"Adi Tharapuram Thambaram"	S. C. Krishnan & A. G. Rathnamala	Thanjai N. Ramaiah Dass	02:41
"Poravale Poravale Ponnurangam"	T. M. Soundararajan & P. Bhanumathi	Thanjai N. Ramaiah Dass	03:15
"O Malliyakka O Rojakka"	Jikki, K. Jamuna Rani & A. G. Rathnamala	Pattukkottai Kalyanasundaram	05:55
"Ondru Serndha Anbu"	P. B. Sreenivas & Udutha Sarojini	A. Maruthakasi	03:22

== Reception ==
Kanthan of Kalki gave the film a positive review.
