= Naan Petra Selvam =

- Theatrical release poster
- Directed by: K. Somu
- Written by: A. P. Nagarajan
- Produced by: A. M. Ismail
- Starring: Sivaji Ganesan; G. Varalakshmi
- Cinematography: J. G. Vijayam
- Edited by: T. Vijayarangam
- Music by: G. Ramanathan
- Production company: Paragon Pictures
- Release date: 14 January 1956
- Country: India
- Language: Tamil

Naan Petra Selvam is a 1956 Indian Tamil-language drama film directed by K. Somu and written by A. P. Nagarajan, starring Sivaji Ganesan and G. Varalakshmi. The film was released on 14 January 1956.

== Plot ==
Shekar, the son of Mirasdar Gunaseelan, discovers that his cousins Gowri and Sundar are leading a difficult life. Gunaseelan has a daughter who was lost when she was a small girl. Shekar tries to help them against his father's wish and angered by his father's attitude, he leaves home with his cousins. Gunaseelan's accountant Vajram and wife Vadamalligai wants to take advantage of this rift and to usurp his employer's wealth. Gunaseelan's loyal servant Poyyamozhi tries his best to reveal Vajram's intentions, but falls to deaf ears. Greedy Vajram opposes his son Arivumathi from marrying Ezhilarasi since she is not from a wealthy family.

Shekar marries Gowri, but Sundar leaves home since he feels that he is a burden on them. Sundar meets with an accident and loses his mental balance. He is rescued by Dr. Sumathi who happens to be Shekar's lost sister. Meanwhile, Gowri is admitted to Dr. Sumathi's maternity nursing home and Shekar tries stealing in order to pay the bills. Unbeknownst to Shekar, he enters Dr. Sumathi's house and was caught red handed by her. However Dr. Sumathi does not call the police but and advises Shekar and lets him go. Gowri learns about this and leaves the nursing home, humiliated by Shekar's deed.

Gowri delivers their first child Selvam, but dies immediately. Shekar found Gowri dead and takes Selvam along with him. Shekar takes refuge with Anthony, a school teacher who provides him with a job and a house. Sundar lives in Dr. Sumathi's house, but he remains mentally unstable. Meanwhile, Arivumathi steals from his home, marries Ezhilarasi and leaves home.

Gunaseelan yearns to meet his son and goes looking for him. Vajram introduces Gunaseelan to a dancer Nalina. Gunaseelan falls for Nalina and shifts to her place along with Vajram, Vadamalligai and Poyyamozhi. Selvam meets with an accident, Poyyamaozhi sees this and bring him back home. Gunaseelan sends for Dr. Sumathi and lets her know to return Selvam to him in the event of not finding Selvam's parents. Sundar meets Selvam and he was able to recall his past. Upon learning the truth, Sundar and Dr. Sumathi sets off to Gunaseelan's place.

Meanwhile, Vajram and Vadamalligai persuades Nalina to imprison Gunaseelan but the plan was spoilt when a robbery takes place and she was attacked by the robber. The robber was Arivumathi who was not aware of the presence of his parents in that place. Nalina confides the truth to the police and dies where Vajram and Vadamalligai are arrested. Shekar was suspected as the robber and gets arrested instead. Poyyamozhi tracks the robber and catches Arivumathi. Ezhilarasi informs the police all Arivumathi's wrongdoings and he confides all his errors and submits.

Anthony reveals that Dr. Sumathi is none other than Gunaseelan's long lost daughter. Gunaseelan and Sekar are delighted with this. Sekar requests Gunaseelan to marry off Sundar to Dr. Sumathi and it was done.

== Cast ==
- Sivaji Ganesan as Sekar
- G. Varalakshmi as Gowri
- M. N. Nambiar as Sundar
- M. N. Rajam as Dr. Sumathi
- K. Sarangapani as Mirazdar Gunaseelan
- V. K. Ramasamy as Vajram
- A. Karunanidhi as Arivumathi
- T. P. Muthulakshmi as Ezhilarasi
- V. M. Ezhumalai as Poyyamozhi
- C. T. Rajakantham as Vadamalligai
- P. D. Sambandam as Antony
- Lakshmikantham as Nalina

== Production ==
Naan Petra Selvam is the first of many collaborations between Ganesan and Nagarajan. The film was produced by A. M. Ismail of Paragon Pictures.

== Soundtrack ==
The music was composed by G. Ramanathan. All lyrics were by Ka. Mu. Sheriff. The title song is set in Jaunpuri raga.

Song	Singers	Length
"Naan Petra Selvam Nalamaana Selvam" (pathos)	T. M. Soundararajan	01:28
"Maadhaa Pidhaa Guru Dheivam"	A. P. Komala	02:57
"Poovaa Manamum Pootthadhu"	T. M. Soundararajan & Jikki	03:15
"Aiyaave Vaarungga Ingge Vaarungga"	M. S. Rajeswari	02:31
"Vaazhndhaalum Esum Thaazhndaalum Esum"	T. M. Soundararajan	02:49
"Thirudaadhe Poi Sollaadhe Pichchai Edukkaade"	A. P. Komala	04:30
"Inbam Vandhu Serumaa Endhan Vaazhvu Maarumaa"	T. M. Soundararajan & Jikki	03:47
"Kaattukkulle Kanda Poovu Kannai Parikkudhu"	T. M. Soundararajan	03:23
"Naan Petra Selvam Nalamaana Selvam"	T. M. Soundararajan	02:56
"Mandhamaarudham.... Manmadhanai Kandathillai"	Thiruchi Loganathan & A. G. Rathnamala	03:17
