= K. S. Prasad =

Indian cinematographer

- Born: Andhra Pradesh, India
- Occupations: Cinematographer; film director; editor; film producer

K. S. Prasad was an Indian cinematographer, editor, production designer, producer, and director known for his works in Telugu, Tamil, Kannada, and Hindi language films. He received the National Film Award for Best Cinematography (color) for the 1968 Tamil film Thillana Mohanambal at the 16th National Film Awards.

== Early life ==
K. S. Prasad was born in 1923 into a Telugu speaking family in Eluru, Andhra Pradesh. He earned degree in Photography from St. Xavier's Technical Institute, Mumbai. He made his foray into cinema with the 1956 Black and White Telugu film Ilavelpu, and the 1964 Tamil color film Puthiya Paravai.

== Selected filmography ==
As cinematographer

- Justice Raja (1983)
- Devajani (1981)
- Seeta Labkush (1980)
- Mathura Bijaya (1979)
- Sri Raam Vanavas (1977)
- Sita Swayamvar (1976)
- Seeta Kalyanam (1976)
- Satyam (1976)
- Ramaiah Thandri (1975)
- Sri Ramanjaneya Yuddham (1975)
- Kode Nagu (1974)
- Sampoorna Ramayan (1973)
- Sampoorna Ramayanam (1971)
- Haathi Mere Saathi (1971)
- Bhale Mastaru (1969)
- Thillana Mohanambal (1968)
- Gauri (1968)
- Thiruvarutchelvar (1967)
- Kandan Karunai (1967)
- Saraswathi Sabatham (1966)
- Thiruvilaiyadal (1965)
- Pudhiya Paravai (1964)
- Iruvar Ullam (1963)
- Ilavelpu (1956)

As producer

- Vamsha Jyothi (1978)
- Baalu Belagithu (1970) (also production designer)

As director

- Rajyamlo Rabandulu (1975)

As editor

- Sri Raam Vanavas (1977)
