= Saraswathi Sabatham =

1966 film by A. P. Nagarajan

- Theatrical release poster
- Directed by: A. P. Nagarajan
- Screenplay by: A. P. Nagarajan
- Based on: Vakkum Vakkum by Pudhumaipithan
- Produced by: A. P. Nagarajan
- Starring: Sivaji Ganesan; Gemini Ganesan; Savitri; Padmini; Devika; K. R. Vijaya
- Cinematography: K. S. Prasanth
- Edited by: M. N. Rajan; T. R. Natarajan
- Music by: K. V. Mahadevan
- Production company: Sri Vijayalakshmi Pictures
- Distributed by: Sivaji Films
- Release date: 3 September 1966
- Running time: 148 minutes
- Country: India
- Language: Tamil

Saraswathi Sabatham (transl. Saraswati's oath) is a 1966 Indian Tamil-language Hindu mythological film written and directed by A. P. Nagarajan. Based on Pudhumaipithan's novel Vakkum Vakkum, it stars Sivaji Ganesan, Gemini Ganesan, Savitri, Padmini, Devika and K. R. Vijaya. The film was released on 3 September 1966 and became a commercial success.

== Plot ==
There is a dispute among three Hindu goddesses about who among them is the most powerful. Narada, a sage and celestial mischief-maker, begins the argument by visiting Saraswati, the goddess of knowledge, and annoys her on purpose by saying that wealth is more important and abundant. Angered, Saraswati states she will prove that knowledge is more important. Narada then goes to Vaikuntha to see Lakshmi, the goddess of wealth and says that knowledge is more abundant. Lakshmi retorts she will prove that wealth is more important. Narada finally goes to Mount Kailash, seeking Parvati, the goddess of strength, and annoys her by saying that wealth and knowledge are more important. Parvati stresses the importance of strength.

Each of the three goddesses, having been turned against one another by Narada, decides to choose someone on earth and bless them with their respective powers so that each of them can prove their power is the most important and make the other two goddesses lose. Saraswati blesses a mute person, Vidyapati, by imparting to him all the knowledge in the world and bestows upon him the gift of speech. The king of Vidyapati's kingdom, Selvapuram, is dying and does not have any children. He orders his minister to send the royal Elephant into the streets with a garland and the person whose neck the Elephant puts the garland on will be his successor. Lakshmi makes the royal Elephant put the garland on a beggar girl, Selvambigai, thus making her wealthy. Parvati blesses Veeravallan, a man who has been a coward his whole life, with the gift of strength.

Vidyapati and Selvambigai happen to meet one another at a temple and get into a heated argument about their respective qualities bestowed on them. Vidyapati finds her too arrogant because of her wealth while Selvambigai finds him egotistical due to his knowledge and both leave the temple in a huff. Selvambigai thinks about her argument with Vidyapati and loses control over her horses. Veeravallan spots her and saves her from a near-fatal accident. Impressed with his bravery, she makes him the commander-in-chief of the kingdom's army. Selvambigai is impressed by Vidyapati's knowledge as well and decides to make him the kingdom's head poet as she feels his knowledge could be useful for the reputation of Selvapuram.

Selvambigai spends too much of her time engaging in a battle of wits with Vidyapati, which makes Veeravallan believe that she is neglecting her royal duties. He instigates his soldiers into rebellion and puts Vidyapati in prison. Selvambigai secretly goes to the prison and asks him to sing in her praise so as to guarantee his freedom; Vidyapati rejects the offer and instead sings in a manner that insults her. Veeravallan learns of the meeting and puts Selvambigai in prison, orders the execution of both her and Vidyapati, and declares himself Selvapuram's ruler. The Gods of the Holy Trinity, Shiva (Haranath), Vishnu (Sivakumar) and Brahma (Sarangkapani) settle the dispute by explaining the importance of knowledge, wealth, and strength combined, and how dangerous it is if each of them is bestowed on human beings separately. Finally, the three Goddesses reconcile and Vidyapati, Selvambigai and Veeravallan realise the importance of wealth, knowledge and strength.

== Cast ==
- Sivaji Ganesan as Vidyapathy and Narada (dual lead roles)
- Gemini Ganesan as Veeravallan
- Savitri as Saraswati
- Padmini as Parvati
- Devika as Lakshmi
- K. R. Vijaya as Selvambigai
- V. Nagayya as Vidyapati's father
- E. R. Sahadevan as a soldier
- Nagesh as the prison warden
- Sivakumar as Vishnu
- Raja as Shiva
- M. Prabhakar Reddy as Brahma
- Manorama as Malli

== Production ==
Saraswathi Sabatham is based on Vakkum Vakkum, a script by Pudhumaipithan that was not produced but instead published as a novel. Though director A. P. Nagarajan had not bought the film rights to the story, Pudhumaipithan's family decided not to file a lawsuit against him. Journalists also noted the film's similarities to the Tamil film Kalavathi (1951).

== Soundtrack ==
The music was composed by K. V. Mahadevan, while the lyrics were written by Kannadasan. The song "Komatha Engal Kulamatha" is set in Abheri, a Carnatic raga.

Song	Singers	Length
"Agaramuthala"	T. M. Soundararajan	03:10
"Deivam Iruppathu Engey"	T. M. Soundararajan	03:32
"Kalviya Selvama Veerama"	T. M. Soundararajan	03:37
"Komatha Engal Kulamatha"	P. Susheela	07:42
"Rani Maharani"	T. M. Soundararajan	03:12
"Thai Thantha"	P. Susheela	03:29
"Uruvathaikattidum Kanaadi"	P. Susheela	03:40

== Release and reception ==
Saraswathi Sabatham was released on 3 September 1966, and distributed by Sivaji Films. On 17 September, The Indian Express wrote, "Fortified with massive sets, trick photography and sincere attempt at retaining the spirit of the theme Saraswathi Sabatham has before it an assured long run." Kalki praised the acting of Sivaji Ganesan and other actors while also praising the music, cinematography and dialogues. The film became a commercial success, running for over 100 days in theatres.

== Legacy ==
Director K. Chandru's Naveena Saraswathi Sabatham (2013) was initially titled Saraswathi Sabatham, but this was changed after negative reactions from Ganesan's fans. The song "Kalviya Selvama Veerama" was also featured in the 2022 film Vikram.

== Bibliography ==
- Ganesan, Sivaji; Narayana Swamy, T. S. (2007) [2002]. Autobiography of an Actor: Sivaji Ganesan, October 1928 – July 2001. Sivaji Prabhu Charities Trust. OCLC 297212002.
