= C. K. Saraswathi =

Indian actress

C. K. Saraswathi (died 1998) was an Indian actress who featured mainly in Tamil films. She was active in the field from 1945 till 1998. During the early days she featured in comedy and character roles. Later she became famous for her acting in negative character roles. Due to her physical appearance, she was mostly given the role of a mother in rich families. One of her more noteworthy character was in Thillana Mohanambal as Vadivambal (Vadivu), portraying the mother of Mohanambal (featured by Padmini).

== Filmography ==
1. En Magan (1945)
2. Vidyapathi (1946)
3. Kanjan (1947) as Anjuham
4. Digambara Samiyar (1950) as Anjalai
5. Marudhanaattu Ilavarasi (1950) as Queen Chitra
6. Rajambal (1951)
7. Singari (1951)
8. Sudharshan (1951)
9. Azhagi (1953)
10. Gumastha (1953) as Ravi's mother
11. Lakshmi (1953)
12. Rohini (film) (1953)
13. Ulagam (1953)
14. Illara Jothi (1954)
15. Kudumbam (1954) as Kamatchi
16. Thookku Thookki (1954)
17. Maheswari (1955)
18. Maaman Magal (1955) as Thandavam's Sister
19. Menaka (1955)
20. Nallavan (1955)
21. Rambaiyin Kaadhal (1956) as Panchavarnam
22. Sadhaaram (1956)
23. Iru Sagodharigal (1957) as Mangamma
24. Samaya Sanjeevi (1957)
25. Soubhagyavathi (1957) as Maragatham
26. Boologa Rambai (1958) as Witch Rangamma
27. Maalaiyitta Mangai (1958)
28. Pathi Bakthi (1958) as Meenakshi
29. Bhaaga Pirivinai (1959) as Akilandam
30. Kaveriyin Kanavan (1959)
31. Koodi Vazhnthal Kodi Nanmai (1959)
32. Naan Sollum Ragasiyam (1959) as Akilandam
33. Nalla Idathu Sammandham (1959)
34. Pennkulathin Ponvilakku (1959)
35. Vannakili (1959)
36. Engal Selvi (1960)
37. Kuravanji (1960)
38. Ponni Thirunaal (1960)
39. Bhagyalakshmi (1961)
40. Ellam Unakkaga (1961)
41. Mamiyarum Oru Veetu Marumagale (1961)
42. Sri Valli (1961) as Nambirajan's wife
43. Yar Manamagan? (1961)
44. Avana Ivan (1962) as Paruvatham (Jamuna and Meena's mother)
45. Paadha Kaanikkai (1962)
46. Paasam (1962) Guest appearance
47. Padithal Mattum Podhuma (1962) as Andal
48. Paarthal Pasi Theerum (1962) as Akilandam
49. Pattinathar (1962) as Visalam
50. Vikramaadhithan (1962)
51. Naanum Oru Penn (1963)
52. Karuppu Panam (1964) as Shankari
53. Muradan Muthu (1964)
54. Navarathri (1964) as One of the inmates of a mental hospital (Guest artiste)
55. Aasai Mugam (1965) as Bhavani Amma
56. Madras to Pondicherry (1966)
57. Mahakavi Kalidas (1966)
58. Kumari Penn (1966)
59. Yaar Nee? (1966) as (drama artist) as ghost mother
60. Kadhal Vaaganam (1968) as Mangalam
61. Lakshmi Kalyanam (1968)
62. Muthu Chippi (1968)
63. Thillana Mohanambal (1968) as Vadivambal
64. Iru Kodugal (1969) as Gopinath's mother
65. Kanne Pappa (1969) Andalammal (Lakshmi's Aunt)
66. Thirudan (1969) as Paravatham
67. Mannippu (1969) as Radha's Mother
68. Namma Kuzhanthaigal (1970)
69. Paadhukaappu (1970)
70. Enga Mama (1970) as Seetha's aunt
71. Kulama Gunama (1971)
72. Aseervatham (1972)
73. Pillaiyo Pillai (1972)
74. Ponnukku Thanga Manasu (1973)
75. Rajapart Rangadurai (1973)
76. School Master (1973)
77. Vandhaale Magaraasi (1973) as Mangamma's Mother
78. Vani Rani (1974)
79. Manidhanum Dheivamagalam (1975)
80. Yarukku Maappillai Yaro (1975)
81. Dasavatharam (1976)
82. Uzhaikkum Karangal (1976) as Akkilandham
83. Navarathinam (1977) as Sagunan
84. Vattathukkul Chaduram (1978)
85. Punniya Boomi (1978)
86. Enga Ooru Rasathi (1980)
87. Thaai Mookaambikai (1982)
88. Pei Veedu (1984)
89. Engal Kural (1985)
90. Nambinar Keduvathillai (1986)
91. Madurai Veeran Enga Saami (1990)
92. Chinna Thambi (1991)
93. Mugguru Attala Muddula Alludu (1991) (Telugu)
94. Bramma (1991)
95. Roja (1992)
96. Suyamariyadhai (1992)
97. Chanti (1992) (Telugu)
98. Porantha Veeda Puguntha Veeda (1993)
99. Sakkarai Devan (1993)
100. Sindhu Nathi Poo (1994)
101. Oru Vasantha Geetham (1994)
102. Naan Petha Magane (1995)as advocate Vishwanathan s mother
103. Iruvar (1997)
104. Kaadhala Kaadhala (1998) as Bhangaru
105. Ponmaanai Thedi (1998) as Sundaram's grandmother
