= Sampoorna Ramayanam (1958 film) =

1958 film by K. Somu

- Theatrical release poster
- Directed by: K. Somu
- Screenplay by: A. P. Nagarajan
- Based on: Ramayana by Valmiki
- Produced by: M. A. Venu
- Starring: N. T. Rama Rao; Padmini
- Cinematography: V. K. Gopanna
- Edited by: T. Vijayarangam
- Music by: K. V. Mahadevan
- Production company: M. A. V. Pictures
- Release date: 14 April 1958
- Running time: 204 minutes
- Country: India
- Language: Tamil

Sampoorna Ramayanam (transl. The Complete Ramayana) is a 1958 Indian Tamil -language Hindu mythological film directed by K. Somu. It is based on Valmiki's Ramayana. The film stars N. T. Rama Rao in the lead role of Rama and Sivaji Ganesan as Bharatha. It was released on 14 April 1958 and ran for over 264 days in theatres, thereby becoming a silver jubilee hit. The film was dubbed into Hindi as Ramayan in 1960.

== Plot ==
The film is the complete Ramayana. It begins at Ayodhya where the Solar dynasty ruler Dasharatha is perturbed over being childless. He conducts Putrakameshti on ordinance of Sage Vashishta, with his 3 wives Kausalya, Sumitra & Kaikeyi. Here, Vishnu with Shesha Shanku & Chakra incarnated as his 4 sons: Rama, Lakshmana, Bharata, & Shatrughna. Parallelly, while tilling the ground, Janaka, the king of Mithila, finds the box enclosing the baby whom he rears as Sita. Time passes, Saint Vishvamitra arrives and seeks to send Ramalakshmana for the protection of his Yaga. Soon, he endorsed them with powerful armaments, which they used to destroy Tataka & Maricha Subahu and accomplish the Yaga.

Meanwhile, Janaka announces Svayamvara to Sita when Vishvamitra moves in with the sibling. Amid, Rama transforms a stone form of Ahalya into normal. Here, the challenge is to affix the world-renowned bow of Siva. However, Ravana lands therein without an invitation but fails and gets humiliated. All at once, Rama breaks it when enraged Parashurama confronts him but realizes he is his continuation and backs up. After the wedding of Sita & Rama, Dasharatha announces Rama's crowning ceremony, which immerses Ayodhya. Begrudged Mandhara sly maid of Kaikeyi poisons her to seek her husband, the two boons at the time of the Devasura war. Dasaratha offers to do so, and Kaikeya forces Bharata's crowning and Rama's exile for 14 years. The heartbroken Dasaratha accedes to Kaikeyi's demands. Rama also deliberately accepts his father's reluctant decree and proceeds with Sita & Lakshmana. Guha crosses them, the Ganges. After that, Dasaratha dies when Bharata backs and flares up on his mother, which makes her regret. Bharata rushes to retrieve Rama but denies obeying his father's words. So, Bharata obtains his sandals as a gesture and starts ruling Ayodhya.

After 13 years, Rama moved to Panchavati, where Ravana's sister, Shurpanakha, entices him, and Lakshmana cuts off her nose & ears. Being aware of it infuriated Ravana ploys to seize Sita with the aid of the Maricha, who turns into a golden deer. Entranced by its beauty, Sita pleads with Rama to capture it when he chases it, leaving Lakshmana as a guard. Rama shoots it and mimics Rama before dying. Frightened, Sita forces Lakshmana to go, which he obeys but stipulates not to cross the chalk outline he drew. Ravana, in the guise of an ascetic, abducts Sita. Jatayu tries to arrest Ravana but loses his wings. Ramalakshmana learns about the fatality via him.

Ongoing, they meet an ascetic Shabari, who directs them toward Kishkindha. So, they step in and befriend Anjineeya & Sugriva. Rama kills his malice brother Vaali and crowns him. Then, Vanara are under the hunt of Seeta. Anjineeya crosses the sea and reaches Lanka, locking Seeta in Ashoka Grove. Here, he bestows the ring and states Rama will take revenge for her insult. Plus, he takes her golden hairband, who returns by setting fire to Lanka and warning Ravana. With the aid of Vanara, Rama constructed a stone bridge over the sea and reached Lanka. Vibhishana, a good Samaritan Ravana's brother, requests him to pardon Rama. As a result, he is ostracized and propitiates with Rama, who promises to bestow Lanka.

The war begins, which destroys most of the demon warriors. So, Ravana awakes his second sibling Kumbhakarna, who is too slaughtered by Rama. Here, Indrajit creates an illusion of Sita's assassination when Rama faints. Now Lakshmana takes charge and collapses by Indrajit's "Nagastram." Anjineeya secures him by "Sanjeevani" and he kills Indrajit. Ultimately, Ravana walks to battle when Rama disarms & asks him to arrive tomorrow. The following day, Ravana confronts him with his ten heads. Rama kills Ravana by getting knowledge of his death secret from Vibhishana. Next, Rama asks Sita to undergo an "Agni Pariksha" test of fire to prove her innocence, as he wants to eliminate the rumors surrounding her. Sita plunges into the sacrificial fire, and Agni raises Seeta, unharmed, to the throne, attesting to her fidelity. At last, Rama backs Ayodhya with Sita, Lakshmana, Anjineeya, and other Vanaras. Finally, the movie ends happily with the Rama's coronation.

== Cast ==
- N. T. Rama Rao as Rama
- Padmini as Sita
  - Sukumari as Young Sita
- Sivaji Ganesan as Bharatha
- P. V. Narasimha Bharathi as Lakshmana
- Santo Krishnan as Hanuman
- T. K. Bhagavathi as Ravana
- V. Nagayya as Dasharatha
- Pushpavalli as Kausalya
- G. Varalakshmi as Kaikeyi
- V. K. Ramasamy as Guhan
- M. N. Rajam as Shurpanakha
- Sandhya as Mandodari

== Production ==
After Town Bus (1955), its producer M. A. Venu decided that his next venture would be Sampoorna Ramayanam, based on the Ramayana, an Indian epic written by Valmiki. It was directed by K. Somu and produced by Venu under M. A. V. Pictures, while A. P. Nagarajan wrote the screenplay. Cinematography was handled by V. K. Gopanna, and the editing by T. Vijayarangam.

K. V. Srinivasan dubbed the voice of N. T. Rama Rao, who played Rama. S. S. Rajendran was initially offered to play Bharata but declined due to his aversion to act in films based on mythology; Sivaji Ganesan was later cast in that role. This marked Ganesan's first mythological film.

== Soundtrack ==
The music composed by K. V. Mahadevan. All lyrics were penned by A. Maruthakasi. Unlike most Tamil films of that era, the songs were composed to form a part of the narrative, as opposed to being standalone segments. Madurai S. Somasundaram was originally hired to sing a few songs, including "Veenai Kodiyudaiya" which was picturised on Ravana. As Bhagavati's lip synching could not match Somasundaram's fast singing, the singer was replaced with C. S. Jayaraman. Offended, Somasundaram left the film and at his request the songs he sang were dropped.

| Song | Singers | Length |
|---|---|---|
| "Annaiyum Pithavumaagi...Yen Pirintheer" | T. M. Soundararajan, Thangappan | 02:31 |
| "Indru Poi Naalai Vaaraai" | C. S. Jayaraman | 02:52 |
| "Neethi Thavarathu" | Sirkazhi Govindarajan | 01:03 |
| "Pathugaiye Thunaiyaagum" | T. M. Soundararajan & Sirkazhi Govindarajan | 02:49 |
| "Sabarikku Raamanum" | Sirkazhi Govindarajan | 06:08 |
| "Sangeetha Sowbagyame" | C. S. Jayaraman | 04:24 |
| "Sree Raamachandhran Magudaabishega" | Sirkazhi Govindarajan & S. C. Krishnan | 00:45 |
| "Ellorum Kondaadum Raamaraajyame" | A. P. Komala, A. G. Rathnamala, K. Rani, Sarojini & Udutha | 00:49 |
| "Thennaadudaiya Sivane...Kannpaarum Enaiyaalum" | C. S. Jayaraman | 02:31 |
| "Paakraan Sumaa Paakraan" | M. S. Rajeswari | 01:02 |
| "Thavamuni Viswamithiran.... Panjanai Meedhu" | C. S. Jayaraman | 06:00 |
| "Veenai Kodiyudaiya" | Thiruchi Loganathan, C. S. Jayaraman | 01:45 |
| "Mannellaam Ponnaagum Raaman Varavaaley" | A. P. Komala, A. G. Rathnamala, S. C. Krishnan, K. Rani, Sarojini & Pathma | 01:45 |
| "Vaazhiya Ulagam... Makkal Pirandhadhai Enni Enniye" | T. M. Soundararajan | 04:28 |
| "Araneri Marandha Thamayanai" | Sirkazhi Govindarajan | 01:40 |
| "Pogadhe Atthaan Pogadhe" | M. S. Rajeswari | 01:02 |
| "Azhagiya Ilangaa Nagarai" | Sirkazhi Govindarajan | 01:02 |
| "Utthaman Pogindraane... Utthaman Raaman Pogindraan" | Ghantasala | 02:30 |
| "Atthiri Munivar Raaman Latchmananai" | Sirkazhi Govindarajan | 02:37 |

== Release and reception ==
Sampoorna Ramayanam was released on 14 April 1958, during Puthandu. Politician C. Rajagopalachari, who wrote the Ramayana as a serialised story in Kalki which was later published as a book, watched this film and appreciated it, particularly Ganesan's performance as Bharata. Usually he was a critic of cinema in general and did not think much about films. In a review dated 27 April 1958, the magazine Ananda Vikatan lauded Ganesan's performance, felt T. K. Bhagavathi was perfect for the role of Ravana, and called the film a must-watch. The film was a major commercial success and ran for over 264 days in theatres, thereby becoming a silver jubilee film, and also being responsible for a renewed interest in mythological films in Tamil cinema.

== Bibliography ==
- Baskaran, S. Theodore (1996). The eye of the serpent: an introduction to Tamil cinema. Chennai: East West Books. OCLC 645890539.
- Ganesan, Sivaji; Narayana Swamy, T. S. (2007) [2002]. Autobiography of an Actor: Sivaji Ganesan, October 1928 – July 2001. Sivaji Prabhu Charities Trust. OCLC 297212002.
- Pauwels, Heidi R.M., ed. (2007). Indian Literature and Popular Cinema: Recasting Classics. Routledge. ISBN 978-1-134-06255-3.
