= Thirumal Perumai =

- Poster
- Directed by: A. P. Nagarajan
- Screenplay by: A. P. Nagarajan
- Based on: Naalayira Divya Prabandham by Alvars
- Starring: Sivaji Ganesan; Padmini
- Cinematography: W. R. Subba Rao
- Edited by: M. N. Rajan; T. R. Natarajan
- Music by: K. V. Mahadevan
- Production company: Thiruvenkateswara Movies
- Release date: 16 February 1968
- Running time: 159 minutes
- Country: India
- Language: Tamil

Thirumal Perumai (transl. Greatness of Vishnu) is a 1968 Indian Tamil-language Hindu mythological film directed by A. P. Nagarajan. The film stars Sivaji Ganesan and Padmini. It was released on 16 February 1968.

== Plot ==
Thirumal Perumai tells three stories about how Vishnu's grace can help solve a person's problems.

Andal

Lakshmi, Hindu goddess of wealth and beauty, is reincarnated as the daughter of Periyalvar in Srivilliputhur. She was named Andal or Kodhai. As she grew up, she learned about Krishna and loved him. She sang the Tiruppavai to wake the deity every morning. Once, she dressed up as a bride and wore the deity's garland before it was offered to him. Just as she was admiring herself – her father caught her and slapped her. After much crying, she promised never to wear the deity's garland again. Periyalvar did puja to Vishnu and put a new garland on him. To his surprise, it fell off. Periyalvar learned that Vishnu only liked garlands that had been worn by Andal. Andal comes in with the previous garland and then they garland Vishnu. Periyalvar later arranges for Andal's marriage after she told him that she dreamed about Krishna marrying her. The two travel to Srirangam and enter the sanctum of the temple. Andal, dressed as a bride merges with the idol and Vishnu appears, telling Periyalvar that Andal was none other than Lakshmi herself. Andal was later considered as the only female Alvar saint and a shrine was built for her in both Srirangam and Srivilliputhur temples.

The Thief

There is a king, who makes one of his men a king of a city. He then gives his daughter in marriage to the new king. The new king is engrossed in war. His wife makes him change his views and he begins building a temple. Gradually he is reduced to the state of robbing to get money for Vishnu's temple. Once he comes across a wedding couple. He takes all their jewels and then looks at the groom's toe ring. He cannot remove it. The groom is actually Vishnu and the bride is the goddess Lakshmi. He falls at their feet and then accompanies the lord to his abode.

The Dancer

There is a dancer who goes to see a sage. Then she vows to make him her slave. Finally, the sage falls in love with her and then the dancer goes to visit her mother. While she is at the temple the sage arrives. The mother is disgusted seeing that he is not rich. Finally, Vishnu takes his jewels in a pot to the mother and she welcomes the sage. The sage is accused of stealing, and just before he is going to be killed, Vishnu comes and saves the day.

== Cast ==
=== Main cast ===
- Sivaji Ganesan as Periyalvar, Thirumangai Alvar, and Thondaradippodi Alvar (Vipranarayanar) (triple role)
- Sivakumar... Vishnu
- Sowcar Janaki... Kumuthavalli
- Padmini... Devadevi
- K. R. Vijaya... Andal
- Kutty Padmini... Younger Kodhai or Andal
- Rajasulochana... Devi, Dancer's sister
- S. N. Lakshmi... Dancer's Mother
- M. Bhanumathi as Goddess Lakshmi

=== Cameo appearance ===
- Nagesh... Raman
- M. N. Nambiar... Chola King
- E. R. Sahadevan.... Chola King
- T. R. Ramachandran... Ranga Thondaradi Podi Alwar Student
- Manorama
- G. Sakunthala...Yasodha
- P. D. Sambandam
- S. Ramarao
- A. Karunanidhi as Nattamai
- T. P. Muthulakshmi as Nattamai's wife
- K. R. Devaki
- Master Prabhakar as little Krishna

== Soundtrack ==
The music was composed by K. V. Mahadevan. The song "Thirumal Perumaikku" is a ragamalika that begins with Madhyamavati raga, followed by Dhanyasi, Mohanam, Kaanada, Saranga, Khamas, Paras, Saramathi, Surutti and Begada, ending with Madhyamavathi again. "Kakkai Chiraginiley" is based on Subramania Bharati's song of the same name.

Song	Singers	Lyrics	Length
"Gopiyar Konjum Ramanaa"	T. M. Soundararajan	Kannadasan	02:12
"Hari Hari Gokula Ramanaa"	T. M. Soundararajan, Master Maharajan, P. Susheela	Kannadasan	03:23
"Kakkai Chiraginiley Nandhalaalaa"	Soolamangalam Rajalakshmi	Subramania Bharati	02:51
"Kannanukkum Kalvanukkum pedhamillai"	P. Susheela	Kannadasan	02:44
"Kannaa Kannaa Kaaviya Vannaa"	P. Susheela	Kannadasan	02:44
"Malargaliley Pala Niram Kanden"	T. M. Soundararajan	Kannadasan	02:46
"Maargazhi Thingal Mathi Niraintha"	P. Susheela	Andal	02:09
"Pachchai Maa Malai pol Meni"	T. M. Soundararajan	Thondaradippodi Alvar	02:08
"Thirumal Perumaikku Nigareathu"	T. M. Soundararajan	Kannadasan	04:43
"Vaaranamaayiram Soozha"	P. Susheela	Andal, Kannadasan	02:34
"Karaiyeri Meen Vilaiyaadum"	P. Susheela, Soolamangalam Rajalakshmi	Kannadasan	02:49

== Reception ==
Kalki praised the acting of Sivaji Ganesan and other actors and Nagarajan's dialogues but called lack of outdoor scenes and the film's play like feel as drawbacks while also panning Kodhai's costume design and Nagesh's acting.
