= Town Bus =

- Film poster
- Directed by: K. Somu
- Written by: A. P. Nagarajan
- Produced by: M. A. Venu
- Starring: N. N. Kannappa; Anjali Devi
- Cinematography: V. K. Gopal
- Edited by: T. Vijayarangam
- Music by: K. V. Mahadevan
- Production company: M. A. V. Pictures
- Release date: 13 November 1955
- Running time: 130 minutes
- Country: India
- Language: Tamil

Town Bus is a 1955 Indian Tamil-language romantic comedy film directed by K. Somu and produced by M. A. Venu. The film was written by A. P. Nagarajan, and the soundtrack was composed by K. V. Mahadevan. The film stars N. N. Kannappa and Anjali Devi, with V. K. Ramasamy, A. Karunanidhi, T. K. Ramachandran, M. N. Rajam and T. P. Muthulakshmi in supporting roles. The plot of the film was built around a bus transport company based in Coimbatore. The film, released on 13 November 1955, performed well at the box office.

== Plot ==
Velu, an unemployed youth, meets a bus conductor Amutha by circumstance, joins the transporter company as driver and gradually gets close to her. The owner's daughter falls in love with him, but her father wants her to marry Ramu, a relative who is the manager of the company. He is only after money and also a womaniser.

Velu's friend Mannaru falls in love with another conductor named Poongavam. The manager dismisses the two drivers, after which Velu becomes an auto rickshaw driver. Soon he sets up his own company and experiences success in a short span of time. He marries Amutha and has a child through her. As he becomes more successful, his lifestyle changes and he falls in love with another woman, a dancer named Pankajam.

Amutha learns about her husband's affair with Pankajam and more complications follow. She eventually learns that Pankajam is her long-lost sister. Ramu locks up Velu in a room with the intention of killing him. The two women and the bus owner's daughter, who remains single, team up to save Velu. In the process, Ramu shoots Pankajam and is arrested. Velu, Amutha and their child unite and live happily.

== Cast ==
Male cast

- N. N. Kannappa as Velu
- V. K. Ramasamy as Ayya Kannu
- A. Karunanidhi as Mannaru
- T. K. Ramachandran as Ramu
- P. D. Sambandam as Vaiyapuri
- P. S. Venkatachalam as Thayanidhipillai
- Kallapart Natarajan as Satagopan
- R. Pakkirisamy as Murugan

Female cast

- Anjali Devi as Amutha
- M. N. Rajam as Pankajam
- T. P. Muthulakshmi as Poongavanam
- K. S. Angamuthu as Meenakshi
- Tambaram Lalitha as Vimala
- Baby Kanchana as Mani

== Production ==
Town Bus was directed by K. Somu and produced by M. A. Venu for M. A. V. Pictures. The film was written by A. P. Nagarajan. V. K. Gopal was the cinematographer. Shooting took place mainly in Coimbatore.

== Soundtrack ==
The music was composed by K. V. Mahadevan, with lyrics by Ka. Mu. Sheriff. Songs such as "Chittukkuruvi Chittukuruvi" (picturised on Anjali Devi) and the dance number "Leda Lady Aruginil Vaada Aadi Paadalam" became popular.

Song	Singers	Length
"Chittukuruvi Chittukuruvi" (Happy)	M. S. Rajeswari	02:21
"Chittukkuruvi Chiitukuruvi" (Sad)	M. S. Rajeswari	03:11
"Chittukkuruvi Chiitukuruvi" (Bit)	M. S. Rajeswari	00:46
"Leda Lady Aruginil"	S. C. Krishnan, Seerkazhi Govindarajan & U. R. Chandra	03:09
"Vadakathi Kallanada.... Thilaalanga Thilaalanga"	T. M. Soundararajan	01:10
"Ponnaana Vaazhvu Mannaagi Poma"	Thiruchi Loganathan, M. S. Rajeswari & Radha Jayalakshmi	05:46
"Panam Padaitha Selvar"		
"Utthamaraai....Thottratthai Kandum"	T. M. Soundararajan	02:53
"Nenjam Urugudhe"	Radha Jayalakshmi	03:11
"Poongavaname Nee Purinji"	S. C. Krishnan & U. R. Chandra	

== Release and reception ==
Town Bus was released on 13 November 1955. The Indian Express wrote, "Anjali Devi appears to game for any kind of role and she makes a truly striking figure as a bus conductress". According to historian Randor Guy, the film was commercially successful mainly because of the music.
