= T. P. Muthulakshmi =

Indian actress

- தூத்துக்குடி பொன்னையா பாண்டியன். முத்துலட்சுமி
- T. P. Muthulakshmi
- Born: T. P. Muthulakshmi; 24 June 1931; Thoothukudi, Madras Presidency, British India (now in Tamil Nadu, India)
- Died: 29 May 2008 (aged 77); Chennai, Tamil Nadu
- Occupation: Actress
- Years active: 1950–1969
- Spouse: P. K. Muthuramalingam (m.1958)
- Children: P. K. J. Vairamuthu
- Parent(s): Father: Ponnaiyapandiyan; Mother: Shanmugathammal
- Relatives: M. Perumal (Uncle)
- Awards: Kalaimamani(2008); Kalaivanar

T. P. Muthulakshmi (Native name: தமிழ்: டி. பி. முத்துலட்சுமி) was an Indian actress who was active from the 1950 to 1969. She was a prominent lead comedy actress during the early 1950s in Tamil films. She has acted in around 350 movies in Tamil language. Her debut film was Ponmudi in 1950, directed by Ellis R. Dungan.

== Early life ==
Muthulakshmi was born in 1931 to Ponnaiyapandiyan and Shanmugathammal at Thoothukudi, Madras Presidency (now in Tamil Nadu). She studied up to eighth grade and while studying she desired to learn Carnatic music and Classical dance and enter the film industry. She confirmed that she would be a cinema actress. In Chennai, her uncle M. Perumal worked as a dancer at the director of the film K. Subramaniyam. With his help she decided to enter the film industry. With the help of Perumal, Muthulakshmi got the chance to be in the mural dance of Chandralekha (1948). Muthulakshmi played the dance scene with a large number of women participants and danced with T. R. Rajakumari in some scenes. She worked for a few months at a salary of 65 rupees at Gemini Studio.

== Career ==
After Mahabahli Chakravarthi, she starred in minor roles in films such as Minmini, Deethwa Manohari and Parijatham. In 1950, she appeared in a comedy role in Ponmudi produced by Modern Theatres, which made a big turn in Muthulakshmi's career. In Or Iravu (1951), with screenplay written by C. N. Annadurai and produced by AVM Productions, she played K. R. Ramasamy's wife Bhavani. In Thirumbi Paar (1953), she played a dumb woman. Muthulakshmi was paired with K. A. Thangavelu, Kaka Radhakrishnan, A. Karunanidhi, J. P. Chandra Babu, T. R. Ramachandran, Major Sundarrajan, S. Rama Rao, and M. R. Radha.

== Personal life ==
Muthulakshmi married P. K. Muthuramalingam in 1958, he was supervisor of the state agency. Chairman of the Tamil Nadu Peninsula Institute. She was Sister in law of famous director T. P. Gajendran. She died on 29 May 2008, having suffered ill health and being hospitalised in Vijaya hospital, then she was shifted to home. She spent one month at home with proper medical care. Her body was cremated in Nungamabakkam, Chennai.

== Awards ==
- Kalaimamani Award - 1999

== Filmography ==
She has acted in around 350 movies in Tamil films.

=== 1940s ===
Year	Movie	Character	Ref(s)
1948	Chandralekha	Group dancer	

=== 1950s ===
Year	Movie	Role	Ref(s)
1950	Ponmudi		
1950	Manthiri Kumari	Karpagam	
1951	Or Iravu		
1951	Sarvadhikari		
1951	Rajambal	Kanakavalli	
1952	Thai Ullam		
1952	Zamindar		
1952	Parasakthi	Kantha	
1952	Valayapathi		
1952	Kalyani		
1953	Thirumbi Paar		
1953	Rohini		
1953	Naalvar		
1954	Koondukili		
1954	Manohara	Malini	
1954	Pon Vayal		
1954	Sugam Enge	Maragatham	
1954	Thuli Visham		
1954	Rajee En Kanmani		
1954	Rajee Na Pranam		
1954	Padmini		
1955	Maheswari		
1955	Kanavaney Kankanda Deivam	Nagi	
1955	Town Bus	Poongavanam	
1955	Gnana Sundari		
1955	Gomathiyin Kaadhalan	Ponnayee/ Parijatham	
1956	Naan Petra Selvam	Ezhilarasi	
1956	Naane Raja		
1956	Paasavalai		
1956	Rambaiyin Kaadhal	Oyyari	
1956	Silambu Guhai		
1957	Chakravarthi Thirumagal		
1957	Aaravalli	Singaravalli	
1957	Mahadhevi	Vasantha	
1957	Iru Sagodharigal	Ponnammal	
1957	Mayabazar		
1957	Soubhagyavathi	Maragatham	
1957	Makkalai Petra Magarasi		
1957	Rani Lalithangi		
1958	Vanjikottai Valiban		
1958	Veerapandiya Kattabomman		
1958	Kadan Vangi Kalyanam		
1958	Nadodi Mannan		
1958	Petra Maganai Vitra Annai	Mohana	
1958	Manamulla Marutharam		
1958	Avan Amaran		
1958	Annaiyin Aanai		
1958	Maya Manithan		
1958	Neelavukku Neranja Manasu		
1959	Vannakili	Eesal	
1959	Thanga Padhumai		
1959	Maragadham		
1959	Thalai Koduthaan Thambi		
1959	Vaazha Vaitha Deivam		
1959	Veerapandiya Kattabomman	Kamakshi	

=== 1960s ===
Year	Movie	Role	Ref(s)
1960	Adutha Veettu Penn		
1960	Padikkadha Medhai		
1961	Thayilla Pillai	Gangamma	
1961	Kappalottiya Thamizhan		
1962	Vadivukku Valaikkappu		
1962	Konjum Salangai	Alangaram	
1962	Sengamala Theevu		
1963	Chittoor Rani Padmini		
1963	Kalyaniyin Kanavan	Ramayee	
1963	Iruvar Ullam		
1964	Navaratri	Cameo Appearance	
1965	Vallavanukku Vallavan	Muthulakshmi	
1966	Anbe Vaa	Pappamma	
1966	Avan Pithana?	Avaiyamma	
1966	Thenmazhai		
1967	Naan		
1967	Anubavi Raja Anubavi	Chithambaram wife	
1967	Thiruvarutchelvar		
1967	Paaladai		
1968	Harichandra		
1968	Thirumal Perumai		
1969	Aayiram Poi	Maragatham	
1969	Poova Thalaiya		
