= Thiruvarutchelvar =

- Theatrical release poster
- Directed by: A. P. Nagarajan
- Screenplay by: A. P. Nagarajan
- Based on: Periya Puranam by Sekkizhar
- Produced by: A. P. Nagarajan
- Starring: Sivaji Ganesan; Gemini Ganesan; Savitri; R. Muthuraman; Padmini
- Cinematography: K. S. Prasanth
- Edited by: M. N. Rajan; T. R. Natarajan
- Music by: K. V. Mahadevan
- Production company: Sri Vijayalakshmi Pictures
- Distributed by: Sivaji Films
- Release date: 28 July 1967
- Country: India
- Language: Tamil

Thiruvarutchelvar is a 1967 Indian Tamil-language film, directed and produced by A. P. Nagarajan. The film stars Sivaji Ganesan, Gemini Ganesan, Savitri and Padmini. It was released on 28 July 1967, and ran for 100 days successfully in theatres.

== Plot ==
This movie chronicles the various "adventures" of Lord Shiva where he played with his devotees, especially, the key Nayanmars of Appar, Sundarar, Thirugnanasambandhar, Tiru Kurippu Thondar and Sekkizhar woven into a intricate narration. Taken largely from Periya Puranam, the movie is episodic and includes tales of how Sekkizhar works to compose it as he narrates the tale of how the Lord tested Tiru Kurippu Thondar, stopped the marriage of Sundarar while showing the world the power of verses of Appar and Sambandar by making them open the gates of temples, that had been locked for centuries, through their songs while also guide Appar to revive a dead child through his songs.

== Cast ==
- Sivaji Ganesan as king, Sekkizhar, Tiru Kurippu Thonda Nayanar, Sundaramoorthy Nayanar, and Thirunavukarasar (Appar) (five role)
- Gemini Ganesan as Shiva
- Savitri as Arulmozhi
- R. Muthuraman as Apputhi Adigal
- Padmini as the dancer who corrects and diverts the King into Spiritual world
- K. R. Vijaya as Suguna Paravai Nachiyar
- Srividya as Sivashakthi Nadanam (credited as Vidhya Moorthy)
- Nagesh as Ponnan
- Manorama as Ponnan's wife
- V. Nagayya
- E. R. Sahadevan as Chola king
- G. Sakunthala as
- Kutty Padmini
- K. Sarangapani
- P. D. Sambandam
- V. Gopalakrishnan as Kulothunga Chola II (Sekkizhar Head of King)
- Senthamarai

== Production ==
Srividya, who went on to become a popular actress made her debut in this film. Her name was shown as Vidhya Moorthy in the introductory credits. Sivaji Ganesan's performance as Appar was inspired by Kanchi Paramacharya of Kanchi Kamakoti Peetham.

== Soundtrack ==
The soundtracks were composed by K. V. Mahadevan and lyrics were by Kannadasan. The song "Nadarmudi" is set in Punnagavarali raga, and "Mannavan Vanthanadi" is set in Kalyani. P. Susheela who sang the song recalled that she was initially nervous to sing this song because of Ganesan's presence at the studio. Noticing it, Ganesan walked out of the studio and Susheela recorded the song.

Track listing
No.	Title	Singer(s)	Length
1.	"Mannavan Vanthaanadi"	P. Susheela
2.	"Aadhi Sivan"	P. Susheela, T. M. Soundararajan
3.	"Irukkum Idatthai Vittu"	Sirkazhi Govindarajan
4.	"Sadhuram Marainthaal"	Master Maharajan
5.	"Sitthamellaam Enakku Sivamayame (Pittha Piraisoodi)"	T. M. Soundararajan
6.	"Om Namasivaya"	T. M. Soundararajan, Chorus
7.	"Ulagellam"	T. M. Soundararajan
8.	"Panniner Mozhiyaal"	T. M. Soundararajan, Master Maharajan
9.	"Aathu Vellam"	A. L. Raghavan, L. R. Eswari
10.	"Kadhalaagi"	T. M. Soundararajan, Master Maharajan
11.	"Naadhar Mudi Melirukkum"	T. M. Soundararajan

== Bibliography ==
- Cowie, Peter; Elley, Derek (1977). World Filmography: 1967. Fairleigh Dickinson University Press. ISBN 978-0-498-01565-6.
- Ganesan, Sivaji; Narayana Swamy, T. S. (2007) [2002]. Autobiography of an Actor: Sivaji Ganesan, October 1928 – July 2001. Sivaji Prabhu Charities Trust. OCLC 297212002.
