= A. P. Nagarajan =

Indian film director, producer, actor and writer

- Nagarajan during interview
- Born: Akkamapettai Paramasivam Kuppusamy stage name Nagarajan; 24 February 1928; Akkamappettai, Sankagiri, Salem district, Madras Presidency, British India
- Died: 5 April 1977 (aged 49); Madras, Tamil Nadu, India
- Other names: Arutselvar, Deiviga Iyakkunar
- Occupations: director, producer, actor and writer
- Years active: 1953–1977
- Spouse: Rani
- Children: 3
- Relatives: Vadivukkarasi (niece)

Akkamapettai Paramasivam Nagarajan (24 February 1928 – 5 April 1977) was an Indian film director, producer, actor and writer who set a trend in film making in Tamil cinema from 1965 to 1977.

== Film career ==
Nagarajan started his own drama company, the Pazhani Kadiravan Nadaga Sabha, and, in 1949, married Rani Ammal. He wrote and acted in several plays and one of his plays "Nalvar" was made into a movie. Nagarajan wrote the screenplay for his own story and play the hero in this film. His film career thus began in 1953. He also acted in many movies for producer M. A. Venu, formerly of Modern Theatres, such as Mangalyam, Nalla Thangal and Pennarasi. He wrote the screenplay for Town Bus and by 1956 decided to focus on writing. He wrote Naan Petra Selvam and Makkalai Petra Maharasi — in the latter, he introduced the ‘Kongu' Tamil accent for the hero. The first of his many mythological films — Sampoorna Ramayanam (1958) — was a big success, and Rajaji, who had little regard for cinema, watched this film and praised Sivaji Ganesan's performance as Bharatha in it. He then started to produce in partnership with actor V. K. Ramasamy. Some of the works of this period include Nalla Idaththu Sammandham (1958), Thayai Pol Pillai, Noolai Pol Selai (1959) and Paavai Vilakku. He made his directorial debut with Vadivukku Valaigaappu (1962). He launched his own production company with Navarathri and then went on to make a mark in the field of mythological cinema as well.

== Filmography ==
Year	Film	Credited as				Language	Notes
Year	Film	Director	Producer	Writer	Actor	Language	Notes
1977	Navarathinam	✓		✓		Tamil	
1977	Sri Krishna Leela	✓				Tamil	
1976	Jai Balaji	✓				Tamil	
1975	Melnaattu Marumagal	✓		✓		Tamil	
1974	Gumasthavin Magal	✓		✓		Tamil	
1973	Karaikkal Ammaiyar	✓		✓		Tamil	
1973	Rajaraja Cholan	✓				Tamil	
1973	Thirumalai Deivam	✓				Tamil	
1972	Agathiyar	✓	✓	✓		Tamil	
1971	Arutperunjothi				✓	Tamil	
1971	Kankaatchi	✓				Tamil	
1970	Thirumalai Thenkumari	✓	✓	✓		Tamil	
1970	Vilayattu Pillai	✓				Tamil	
1969	Gurudhakshanai	✓				Tamil	
1969	Vaa Raja Vaa	✓	✓	✓		Tamil	
1968	Thillana Mohanambal	✓	✓	✓		Tamil	National Film Award for Best Feature Film in Tamil
1968	Thirumal Perumai	✓		✓		Tamil	
1967	Thiruvarutchelvar	✓	✓	✓		Tamil	
1967	Seetha	✓				Tamil	
1967	Kanthan Karunai	✓		✓		Tamil	
1966	Saraswathi Sabatham	✓	✓	✓		Tamil	
1965	Thiruvilaiyadal	✓	✓	✓	✓	Tamil	National Film Award for Best Feature Film in Tamil
1964	Navarathri	✓		✓		Tamil	
1963	Kulamagal Radhai	✓		✓		Tamil	
1962	Vadivukku Valai Kappu	✓		✓		Tamil	
1960	Paavai Vilakku			✓		Tamil	
1959	Alli Petra Pillai			✓		Tamil	
1959	Thayapol Pillai Noolapol Selai		✓	✓		Tamil	
1958	Neelavukku Neranja Manasu			✓		Tamil	
1958	Petra Maganai Vitra Annai			✓		Tamil	
1958	Sampoorna Ramayanam			✓		Tamil	
1958	Nalla Idathu Sammandham		✓	✓		Tamil	
1957	Makkalai Petra Magarasi		✓	✓		Tamil	
1956	Naan Petra Selvam			✓		Tamil	
1955	Nalla Thangal				✓	Tamil	
1955	Town Bus			✓		Tamil	
1955	Asai Anna Arumai Thambi				✓	Tamil	
1955	Nam Kuzhandai				✓	Tamil	
1955	Pennarasi				✓	Tamil	
1955	Nalla Thangai			✓		Tamil	
1954	Mangalyam				✓	Tamil	
1953	Naalvar			✓	✓	Tamil	

== Death ==
He died of cardiac arrest on 5 April 1977 in Chennai, Tamil Nadu, India, aged 49.

== Awards ==
- He won Filmfare Award for Best Film - Tamil - Thiruvilaiyadal (1965)
