= List of Telugu films of 1959 =

This is a list of films produced by the Telugu film industry based in Chennai in 1959.

Title	Director	Cast	Music director
Aalu Magalu	S. V. Krishna Rao	Jaggayya, Girija, Sowcar Janaki	K. V. Mahadevan
Appu Chesi Pappu Koodu	L. V. Prasad	N. T. Rama Rao, Savitri, Jagayya, Jamuna	S. Rajeswara Rao
Bala Nagamma	Vedantam Raghavayya	N. T. Rama Rao, Anjali Devi, S. V. Ranga Rao	T. V. Raju
Banda Ramudu	P. Pullaiah	N. T. Rama Rao, Savitri	V. Dakshinamoorthy
Bhagya Devathai	Tapi Chanakya	Jagayya, Gemini Ganesan, Savitri, Rajasulochana	Master Venu
Bhaktha Ambareesha	Bolla Subba Rao	Kanta Rao, Sriranjani	L. Malleswara Rao
Daiva Balam	Vasanth Kumar Reddy	N. T. Rama Rao, Jayashree, Sobhan Babu	Ashwathama
Illarikam	T. Prakash Rao	A. Nageswara Rao, Jamuna, Gummadi	T. Chalapathi Rao
Jayabheri	P. Pullaiah	A. Nageswara Rao, Anjali Devi	Pendyala Nageswara Rao
Jaya Vijaya	B. Vittalacharya	Kanta Rao, Krishna Kumari	
Karmika Vijayam	M. A. Thirumugam	Gemini Ganesan, B. Sarojadevi, P. Kannamba	
Koothuru Kaapuram	Sobhanadri Rao	Jagayya, Jamuna, Ramana Reddy	Ghantasala
Krishna Leelalu	Chandrasekhara Rao Jampana	Lakshmirajyam, S. V. Ranga Rao, Sriranjani, Sandhya	S. Dakshinamurthi
Maa Inti Mahalakshmi	G. Raminedu	Gummadi, Jamuna, Harnath	Ashwathamma
Mangalya Balam	Adurthi Subba Rao	A. Nageswara Rao, Savitri, S. V. Ranga Rao	Master Venu
Manorama	K. Bhaskar Rao	Balaiah, Krishna Kumari, Girija	Ramesh Naidu
Pelli Meeda Pelli	B. Vittalacharya	J. V. Ramana Murthi, Krishna Kumari	Rajan–Nagendra
Pellinaati Pramanalu	K. V. Reddy	A. Nageswara Rao, Jamuna, Rajasulochana	Ghantasala
Pelli Sandadi	D. Yoganand	A. Nageswara Rao, Anjali Devi	Ghantasala
Raja Malaya Simha	B. S. Ranga	Ranjan, Rajasulochana, Sowcar Janaki	Viswanathan–Ramamoorthy
Rechukka Pagatichukka	Kamalakara Kameswara Rao	N. T. Rama Rao, Sowcar Janaki	T. V. Raju
Sabhash Ramudu	C. S. Rao	N. T. Rama Rao, Devika, Gummadi	Ghantasala
Sati Sukanya	Chandra Mohan	Amarnath, Krishna Kumari	Ghantasala
Sati Tulasi	V. Madhusudhana Rao	Gummadi, S. Varalakshmi	Pamarthi Venkateswara Rao
Sipayi Koothuru	P. Chengaiah	Jamuna, Gummadi, Suryakantam, V. Nagayya, Kaikala Satyanarayana	
Vachina Kodalu Nachindi	D. Yoganand	N. T. Rama Rao, Jamuna	V. Dakshinamoorthy
Veera Bhaskarudu	K. B. Nagabhushanam	Udaykumar, S. Varalakshmi, Balakrishna	S. Hanumantha Rao
Veera Pandya Katta Brahmana	B. R. Panthulu	Sivaji Ganesan, Gemini Ganesan, Savitri, S. Varalakshmi	G. Ramanathan
