= Annapurna (film) =

1960 film

- Directed by: V. Madhusudan Rao
- Written by: Aarudhra; Sadasivabrahmam
- Produced by: V. B. Rajendra Prasad
- Starring: Jamuna; Jaggayya; Relangi; C. S. R. Gummadi
- Cinematography: Kamal Ghosh
- Music by: Susarla Dakshinamurthi
- Production company: Jagapathi Art Pictures
- Release date: 1960
- Running time: 166 minutes
- Country: India
- Language: Telugu

Annapurna is a 1960 Indian Telugu-language drama film directed by V. Madhusudan Rao.

== Cast ==
- Jamuna as Annapurna
- Jaggayya as Anand
- Gummadi as Ramayya
- C. S. R. as Ranganadham
- Mukkamala as Narayya/Narahari
- Relangi as Raja Rao
- Ramana Reddy as Kotayya
- Sarathi as Chandu
- Dr. Sivaramakrishnaiah
- Girija as Rani
- Chhaya Devi
- Master Babu as Babu

== Soundtrack ==
Annapurna

Film score by Susarla Dakshinamurthi
- Released: 1960
- Genre: Soundtrack
- Producer: Susarla Dakshinamurthi

Music composed by Susarla Dakshinamurthi.

S. No.	Song title	Lyrics	Singers	length
1	"Manasemito Telisindile"	Aarudhra	P. B. Srinivas, P. Susheela	
2	"Nee Pooja Chesenu"	Aarudhra	P. Susheela	
3	"Neevevvaro Chirunavvulato"	Aarudhra	P. B. Srinivas, Savitri	
4	"Rathammo Rathammo"	Aarudhra	Pithapuram Nageswara Rao, Swarnalatha	
5	"Tala Tala Mila Mila"	Aarudhra	P. Susheela	
6	"Vagalaadi Vayyaram"	Aarudhra	Ghantasala, Jikki	
7	"Yentho Chakkani"	Aarudhra	Pithapuram, K. Jamuna Rani	
8	"Kulasa Radoi"	Aarudhra	Jikki	
9	"Okaru Chesina"	Aarudhra	Ghantasala	
10	"Galivana Kuripinche"	Aarudhra	P.Susheela	
