= Santhanam (film) =

- Theatrical release poster
- Directed by: C. V. Ranganatha Das; L. V. Prasad (supervision)
- Written by: Anisetty & Pinisetty (dialogues)
- Produced by: C. V. Ranganatha Das
- Starring: Akkineni Nageswara Rao; Savitri
- Cinematography: Rahman; Prasad; Raja Mani
- Edited by: P. V. Manikyam
- Music by: Susarla Dakshina Murthy
- Production company: Sadhana Films
- Release date: 5 August 1955
- Country: India
- Language: Telugu

Santhanam (transl. Children) is a 1955 Indian Telugu-language drama film, produced & directed by C. V. Ranganatha Das under the Sadhana Films banner while L. V. Prasad supervised direction. It stars Akkineni Nageswara Rao, Savitri and music composed by Susarla Dakshina Murthy. The film is the debut of legendary singer Lata Mangeshkar in the Telugu film industry. The song Nidura Pora Thammuda was a trend setter in being a theme song that unites lost siblings. The film was remade in Tamil as Marakka Mudiyuma?.

== Cast ==
- Akkineni Nageswara Rao as Ramu/Krishna
- Savitri as Sharada
- S. V. Ranga Rao as Rangaiah
- Chalam as Babu
- Amarnath as Madhu
- Relangi as Subba Raju
- Ramana Reddy as Manager
- Mikkilineni as Narahari Rao
- Chadalavada as Subbaiah
- Allu Ramalingaiah as Lingaiah
- Padmanabham as Shankaram
- Sriranjani Jr. as Lakshmi
- Kusuma Kumari as Sarala
- Hemalatha as Ravamma

== Soundtrack ==
Santhanam

Film score by Susarla Dakshina Murthy
- Released: 1955
- Genre: Soundtrack
- Length: 17:08
- Producer: Susarla Dakshina Murthy

Music composed by Susarla Dakshina Murthy. Lyrics were written by Anisetty & Pinisetty. Music released on Audio Company.

=== Telugu songs ===
S. No.	Song title	Singers	length
1	"Nidhurapora Thammudaa"	Lata Mangeshkar & Ghantasala	3:41
2	"Challani Vennela"	Ghantasala	3:54
3	"Kanumoosinaka.... Santhoshamela Sangeethamela"	S. P. Kodandapani & K. Jamuna Rani	3:38
4	"Devi Sridevi"	Ghantasala	2:26
5	"Nidhurapora Thammuda" (Pathos)	Lata Mangeshkar	3:29
6	"Murali Ganamidena"	Jikki	3:31
7	"Idhi Vintha Jeevithame"	S. Dakshinamurthi & T. Sathyavathi	
8	"Amma Maayamma"	Jikki	
9	"Ee Chitta Anaamatthu"	Ghantasala	
10	"Ee Lokana Veliyai Vilapinchutena"	Jikki	
11	"Kanumusina Kanipinche NIjamedhira"	Ghantasala	
12	"Kalalu Pande Kalamantha (Bit)"	Lata Mangeshkar	
13	"Chacchiri Sodarul (Padyam)"	Ghantasala	
14	"Pokun Maandhu Dhehamevidhamunan"	Ghantasala	
15	"Bava Eppudu Vacchitheevu (Padyam)"	Ghantasala	
16	"Lavokkinthayu Ledhu Dhairyamu (Padyam)"	Ghantasala	

=== Tamil songs ===
S. No.	Song title	Singers	length
1	"Manamakizhvudan .. Santhoshamethaan"	A. M. Rajah, K. Jamuna Rani	3:07
2	"Murali Ganamidhe"	Jikki	3:12
3	"Amma Paaramma"	Jikki	3:16
4	"Niththirai Po" (Pathos)	P. Leela	3:22
5	"Puvi Meedhile"	T. M. Soundararajan	2:39
6	"Thannoli Vennilavo"	Ghantasala	3:00

== Tamil version ==
The film was dubbed into Tamil with the same title and released in 1956. Dialogues were written by Thanjai T. K. Govindan and the lyrics were penned by Kuyilan.
