= Alibabavum 40 Thirudargalum (1956 film) =

1956 film by T. R. Sundaram

- Theatrical release poster
- Directed by: T. R. Sundaram
- Written by: Modern Theatres Story Department
- Based on: Ali Baba and the Forty Thieves
- Produced by: T. R. Sundaram
- Starring: M. G. Ramachandran; P. Bhanumathi
- Cinematography: W. R. Subba Rao
- Edited by: L. Balu
- Music by: Susarla Dakshinamurthi
- Production company: Modern Theatres
- Release date: 14 January 1956
- Running time: 149–160 minutes (Note: The 2017 book Contes et légendes d'Orient by Hervé Dumont gives the runtime as 149 minutes, while Encyclopedia of Indian Cinema gives its runtime as 160 minutes.)
- Country: India
- Language: Tamil

Alibabavum 40 Thirudargalum (transl. Alibaba and the Forty Thieves) is a 1956 Indian Tamil-language fantasy swashbuckler film directed and produced by T. R. Sundaram of Modern Theatres. The film stars M. G. Ramachandran and P. Bhanumathi, with K. Sarangapani, P. S. Veerappa, K. A. Thangavelu, M. N. Rajam, Sushila, Vidhyavathi, and M. G. Chakrapani in supporting roles. It revolves around Alibaba, a woodcutter who becomes wealthy after finding a secret treasure cave, but must keep his source of wealth a secret to lead a peaceful life.

Alibabavum 40 Thirudargalum was shot in Gevacolor and is notable for being the first Tamil and South Indian full-length colour film. It is a remake of the 1954 Hindi film Alibaba Aur 40 Chor, itself based on the story Ali Baba and the Forty Thieves from One Thousand and One Nights. It is also the second Tamil film adaptation of that story, after the 1941 film of the same name. Filming took place mainly at Mysore and Yercaud. The soundtrack was composed by Susarla Dakshinamurthi, and re-used many songs from Alibaba Aur 40 Chor.

Alibabavum 40 Thirudargalum was released on 14 January 1956, during the festive occasion of Pongal. It was a milestone in Ramachandran's career and became a success at the box office which was largely attributed to it being the first full-length colour film in South India. The songs also attained popularity. The film won the Film Fans' Association Award for Best Tamil Film.

== Plot ==
Marziana, a Baghdad-based dancer, is abducted by the tyrant Sher Khan, commander of the notorious king Amir Kasim Khan, to his palace. She is rescued by Alibaba, a woodcutter who fights with Sher Khan and vanquishes him. Marziana and her sidekick Dowlath find refuge in Alibaba's house who lives with his sister Ayisha and servant Bulbul. Marziana learns that they are the siblings of Kasim, who had driven them out at the instigation of his cruel wife Salima. Marziana and Alibaba later fall in love. When Alibaba goes to cut wood, he chances upon the cavernous hideout of Abu Hussain, the leader of forty dacoits, and overhears the secret code to enter and exit the cave. After the dacoits leave, Alibaba uses the code word, enters the hideout, and takes some of the cave's wealth which he uses to help poor people nearby. Both Alibaba and Marziana become wealthy overnight.

Kasim becomes jealous when he hears about his brother's fortune and wishes to uncover the secret behind it. Under Salima's guidance, he invites Alibaba and his household to a feast. After cunningly discovering the secret of the dacoits' cave, Kasim sentences Alibaba to death, falsely accusing him of attempted murder. Marziana pretends to heed Kasim's order, declaring that Alibaba has been unfaithful to her and deserves this retribution. Taking a knife, Marziana acts as though she intends to kill Alibaba, but instead cuts the ropes binding his hands. A fight ensues between Alibaba and Kasim's thugs, during which Salima is accidentally killed. However, Alibaba manages to subdue them and escapes with his allies.

Kasim enters the cave and greedily begins collecting treasures. He soon forgets the code word and finds himself trapped. The dacoits return and kill him for trespassing into their secret cave. Alibaba later visits the location and is shocked to find his brother dead; he takes the corpse away. After Kasim's death is publicly announced, Alibaba is proclaimed the new king of Baghdad, and everyone rejoices. Meanwhile, the dacoits return to their cave and discover that Kasim's corpse is missing. Realising that someone else has entered their cave, they begin searching for this mysterious intruder. From the cobbler Ghulam's assertion that the woodcutter Alibaba has become wealthy overnight, Abu Hussain deduces that it was Alibaba who uncovered the secret of the cave, but then kills Ghulam. He subsequently plots to kill Alibaba.

Having his men hide inside barrels, Abu Hussain approaches Alibaba's house disguised as an oil merchant seeking shelter for the night. However, Marziana overhears him whispering to his men, recognising his true identity. While she dances at a banquet hosted by Alibaba in honour of the guest, Dowlath and Bulbul roll the barrels one by one towards the waterfall as per their plan. After Marziana attempts unsuccessfully to stab the "oil merchant," she exposes him as Abu Hussain, shocking Alibaba. This revelation leads to a confrontation between the two men, culminating in Abu Hussain kidnapping Marziana and fleeing to the cave. Alibaba pursues him and reaches the cave, where he kills Abu Hussain after an intense battle. After rescuing Marziana, they marry and continue their social work.

== Cast ==
Male cast

- M. G. Ramachandran as Alibaba
- K. Sarangapani as Dowlath
- P. S. Veerappa as Abu Hussain
- K. A. Thangavelu as Ghulam
- M. G. Chakrapani as Amir Kasim Khan
- Boopathi Nandaram as Sher Khan
- O. A. K. Thevar as Hameed
- K. K. Soundar as Abdullah
- Gundu Mani, Gopal, Muthu, Janakiram as sepoys

Female cast

- P. Bhanumathi as Marziana
- Vidyavathi as Salima
- M. N. Rajam as Bulbul
- P. Sushila as Ayisha

Dance

- Sayee & Subbulakshmi
- Waheeda Rehman

== Production ==
=== Development ===
After the success of the Hindi film Alibaba Aur 40 Chor (1954), based on the story Ali Baba and the Forty Thieves from One Thousand and One Nights, Modern Theatres bought the rights to remake the film in Tamil as Alibabavum 40 Thirudargalum. The film's story is credited to the Modern Theatres' Story Department. Alibabavum 40 Thirudargalum became the second major Tamil film adaptation of the story of Ali Baba; the first was the 1941 film of the same name. While that version was a comedy, this one was more action-oriented.

In addition to producing, Modern Theatres founder T. R. Sundaram also directed the film. A. J. Dominic was signed as the film's art director, while W. R. Subba Rao, L. Balu, and Murasoli Maran were in charge of the cinematography, editing, and dialogues respectively. A. K. Chopra and K. N. Dhandayudhapani Pillai were in charge of the choreography.

=== Casting ===
M. G. Ramachandran was cast as Alibaba, this being the final of his three-film contract with Modern Theatres, following Manthiri Kumari (1950) and Sarvadhikari (1951). He was paid ₹12,500 (equivalent to ₹1.4 million or US$15,000 in 2023) (Note: The exchange rate in 1956 was 4.79 Indian rupees (₹) per 1 US dollar (US$).) for acting in the film. The screenplay was written in a way that would suit his then "swashbucking" image, as opposed to the original story where the character was a "gullible simpleton".

Padmini was initially cast as Marziana, but she was eventually replaced by P. Bhanumathi. Bhanumathi liked the film, one of her earliest in Tamil, because she found her character a "go-getter". In her autobiography, Bhanumathi noted that after she heard the story, she considered her role to be much better than that in Missamma (1955), from which she was fired after filming only four reels, adding that after she accepted to work on this film, she got more acting offers from Tamil film producers.

Ramachandran's elder brother M. G. Chakrapani was cast in the role of Alibaba's elder brother Amir Kasim Khan. Jayalalithaa's aunt Ambujavalli appeared as Kassim's wife Salima, using the screen name Vidhyavathi. Waheeda Rehman, who later became a leading actress in Hindi cinema, appeared as a dancer in the number "Salaam Babu", while the dancer duo Sayee–Subbulakshmi appeared in the song "Naama Aaduvadhum".

=== Filming ===
Alibabavum 40 Thirudargalum was shot entirely on indoor sets, with the exception of a few horse riding sequences. For changes of scenes, irises and wipes were used which, according to Encyclopaedia of Indian Cinema by Ashish Rajadhyaksha and Paul Willemen, added a "sense of anachronism" to the film. It was also the first full-length Tamil colour film, shot in Gevacolor. Rajadhyaksha and Willemen claim it to be the first South Indian film in Gevacolor, despite the fact that the 1955 Tamil film Kanavane Kankanda Deivam had a few sequences in Gevacolor. The scenes involving horses, which belonged to the Mysore Reserve Police, were shot at Mysore over ten days. The thieves' cave, designed by Dominic, was created at two locations – the exterior cave scenes with the horses were shot at Mysore, while the interior scenes were shot at Yercaud near Salem. Sundaram brought twenty horses from Mysore for the shoot at Yercaud. The jewels and gold coins featured in the film were actually clay painted in gold. One of the horses rode by Ramachandran was Sundaram's own.

In one particular scene, Ramachandran objected to the dialogue where he had to swear in the name of Allah, as he was then associated with the rationalist Dravida Munnetra Kazhagam. He suggested that the dialogue be changed to swearing in the name of his mother, but was finally asked by the director to use the original dialogue. For the scene where Bulbul (M. N. Rajam) and Dowlath (K. Sarangapani) roll the barrels containing the hiding dacoits one by one into the waterfall, Sundaram finalised Hogenakkal Falls as the shooting spot. Shooting also took place on an identical set designed by Dominique. The scenes taken on set were combined with the outdoor scenes seamlessly. When only a song and a fight sequence were left to be finished, Ramachandran could not appear for the shoot, since he had to shoot for Madurai Veeran (1956). As Sundaram was unwilling to wait for Ramachandran's return, those portions were eventually shot with Karadimuthu, who acted as a body double for Ramachandran. Alibabavum 40 Thirudargalum was processed at the Film Centre, Bombay (now Mumbai). The final length of the film was 16,789 feet (5,117 m).

== Themes and influences ==
Alibabavum 40 Thirudargalum is based on the story of Ali Baba from One Thousand and One Nights. Although the tale and costumes are middle eastern, Marziana, a Muslim, often refers to Yama, the Hindu god of death. Historian Sachi Sri Kantha noted that various Ramachandran films reflect the 1950s trend of films being "costume dramas" that focus on princes and folk heroes, citing Alibabavum 40 Thirudargalum as an example.

Ramachandran was an avid fan of action heroes like Errol Flynn, John Barrymore, and Douglas Fairbanks. Throughout the 1950s, he acted in films that justified his status as an action hero. Alibabavum 40 Thirudargalum portrayed him as a swashbuckling action hero who also has a Robin Hood-like agenda of serving the poor and the downtrodden with the treasure he finds in the cave. Udhav Naig of The Hindu noted that through Alibabavum 40 Thirudargalum and several other films, Ramachandran "posited a cleverly-crafted image of being one among the working classes and poorer sections, raising a fist against injustice."

Rajadhyaksha and Willemen, in Encyclopedia of Indian Cinema, compare it to Ramachandran's other films like Malaikkallan (1954) and Madurai Veeran (1956) as they are also Robin Hood-inspired, and because Bhanumathi plays a damsel in distress in them. The French website Jol-Press compared it to Manthiri Kumari because both films feature Ramachandran as a Flynn-inspired hero.

== Music ==
The film's original soundtrack and score were composed by Susarla Dakshinamurthi, while the lyrics were written by A. Maruthakasi. T. R. Sundaram decided to use the same tunes set from Alibaba Aur 40 Chor. Udumalai Narayana Kavi was offered to write the lyrics. He declined, saying that he would only write lyrics for fresh tunes and recommended Maruthakasi. The song "Azhagaana Ponnu Naan" is based on "Dekho Ji Shanti Nikla", "Masila Unmai Kathale" is based on "Ae Saba Unse Kah Jara", "Chinnanjiru Chitte" is based on "Chalo Chalo Chale Hum Babul Ke Tale", and "En Aattamellaam" is based on "Sharmake Lajake"; all from Alibaba Aur 40 Chor. The dilruba in the songs were played by Shanmugham. "Azhagaana Ponnu Naan" is set in the Mayamalavagowla raga. The opening line of "Azhagaana Ponnu Naan" was later used in a song titled "Azhagana Ponnu Thaan" from Nenjirukkum Varai (2006). "Ullasa Ulagam" was later remixed by Pravin Mani and Vidyasagar in Jayamkondaan (2008). "Chinnanchiru Chitte" was remixed in Muruga (2007). Elements from the song were also used in "Andangkaka" from Anniyan (2005). The songs received positive reviews with "Azhagaana Ponnu Naan", "Masila Unmai Kathale", and "Ullaasa Ulagam" becoming popular among the masses.

Track listing
No.	Title	Singer(s)	Length
1.	"Masila Unmai Kathale"	A. M. Rajah, P. Bhanumathi	3:04
2.	"Chinnanjiru Chitte"	S. C. Krishnan, Jikki	2:53
3.	"Azhagaana Ponnu Naan"	P. Bhanumathi	3:04
4.	"Naama Aaduvathum"	Swarna Latha, K. Jamuna Rani	3:34
5.	"Unnaivida Maattaen"	P. Bhanumathi	2:40
6.	"Ullaasa Ulagam"	Ghantasala	2:47
7.	"Salaam Baabu"	Jikki	4:19
8.	"Anbinaale Aalavandha"	P. Bhanumathi	3:25
9.	"En Aattamellaam"	P. Bhanumathi	3:56

== Release and reception ==
Alibabavum 40 Thirudargalum was released on 14 January 1956, during the festive occasion of Pongal, delayed from a 12 January release. Historian V. Sriram believes it was the first Tamil film to take advantage of block colour advertising. The film was a commercial success and ran for over 100 days in theatres. Tamil film historian S. Theodore Baskaran wrote in his 1996 book The Eye of the Serpent, "The film's cast of M.G. Ramachandran as the swash-buckling Alibaba, Bhanumathi as the singing-heroine ... and Thangavelu as the comedian was the main factor contributing to its huge success." He said another factor attributed to the film's success that it was the first full-length South Indian colour film. Sachi Sri Kantha felt that the Gevacolor looked somewhat "washed out" and "inferior" to other colouring processes like Eastmancolor and versions of Fujicolor. He said the film succeeded with the Tamil masses because "it was a first time experience they could enjoy the [colour] in totality. This is because illiterate Tamil masses would have watched Hollywood movies produced in [colour] for entertainment. But, being illiterate, [the] majority wouldn't have comprehended the dialogues and songs in English." It won the Film Fans' Association Award for Best Tamil Film. The film was later dubbed in Telugu as Ali Baba 40 Dongalu. Alibabavum 40 Thirudargalum had a limited re-release on 14 April 2011, during the festive occasion of Puthandu (Tamil New Year) in Chennai. The film was released on home video by Moser Baer in June 2010, and by Raj Video Vision in April 2012.

== Legacy ==
Alibabavum 40 Thirudargalum became a "landmark" in Ramachandran's acting career, and set a "precedent for many buccaneer-style characters" he would portray in his later films. In Encyclopedia of Indian Cinema, Rajadhyaksha and Willemen said the film was one of Ramachandran's "most characteristic 50s genre films".

== In popular culture ==
Alibabavum 40 Thirudargalum has been referenced in many films. Janagaraj's character Sethupathi in Rajadhi Raja (1989) sings a portion of "Ullasa Ulagam", before meeting with a fate similar to that of Ghulam in Alibabavum 40 Thirudargalum. Goundamani and Sathyaraj's characters imitate the song "Maasila Unmai Kadhale" in Rickshaw Mama (1992). Vellaisamy (Vadivelu) and Pazhanisamy (Vivek) sing the beginning portion of "Ullasa Ulagam" in Pongalo Pongal (1997). In Baba (2002), the title character (Rajinikanth) and his friends see the clip where Alibaba closes the cave using the phrase "close sesame" after entering it using the words "open sesame". Actor Narayan Lucky has stated that his 2015 film Thiranthidu Seese was named after the dialogue of the same name spoken by Ramachandran in Alibabavum 40 Thirudargalum. In Thoppi (2015), the Minister for Hindu Religious and Charitable Endowments orders police inspector Kuzhanthaisamy to find a stolen film reel box; the film is Alibabavum 40 Thirudargalum.

== Bibliography ==
- Baskaran, S. Theodore (1996). The eye of the serpent: an introduction to Tamil cinema. East West Books. OCLC 243920437.
- Bhanumathi (2000) [1993]. Musings. P.B.R. Publications. OCLC 605305925.
- Dumont, Hervé (2017). Contes et légendes d'Orient: au cinéma et à la télévision [Tales and legends of the East: in cinema and on television] (in French). Books on Demand. ISBN 978-2-3221-0135-1.
- Gokulsing, K. Moti; Dissanayake, Wimal (2013). Routledge Handbook of Indian Cinemas. Routledge. ISBN 978-0-415-67774-5.
- Guy, Randor (1997). Starlight, Starbright: The Early Tamil Cinema. Amra Publishers. OCLC 1129588233.
- Kannan, R. (2017). MGR: A Life. India: Penguin Random House. ISBN 978-0-14-342934-0.
- Pillai, Swarnavel Eswaran (2015). Madras Studios: Narrative, Genre, and Ideology in Tamil Cinema. SAGE Publications. ISBN 978-93-5150-212-8.
- Rajadhyaksha, Ashish; Willemen, Paul (1998) [1994]. Encyclopaedia of Indian Cinema. British Film Institute and Oxford University Press. ISBN 0-19-563579-5.
- Swaminathan, Roopa (2002). M.G. Ramachandran: Jewel of the Masses. Rupa Publications. ISBN 81-7167-897-1.
- Sundararaman (2007) [2005]. Raga Chintamani: A Guide to Carnatic Ragas Through Tamil Film Music (2nd ed.). Chennai: Pichhamal Chintamani. OCLC 295034757.
