= Ilavelpu =

- Theatrical release poster
- Directed by: D. Yoganand
- Written by: Pinisetty Srirama Murthy (dialogues)
- Screenplay by: D. Yoganand
- Story by: Vempati Sadasivabrahmam
- Based on: Edhir Paradhathu (1954)
- Produced by: L. V. Prasad
- Starring: Akkineni Nageswara Rao; Anjali Devi; Jamuna
- Cinematography: K. S. Prasad
- Edited by: A. Sanjeevi
- Music by: Susarla Dakshina Murthy
- Production company: Lakshmi Productions
- Release date: 21 June 1956
- Country: India
- Language: Telugu

Ilavelpu (transl. Deity) is a 1956 Telugu-language drama film, produced by L. V. Prasad under the Lakshmi Productions banner and directed by D. Yoganand. It stars Akkineni Nageswara Rao, Anjali Devi and Jamuna, with music composed by Susarla Dakshina Murthy. The film is a remake of the Tamil film Edhir Paradhathu (1954). The film was a box office hit.

== Cast ==
- Akkineni Nageswara Rao as Sekhar
- Anjali Devi as Sharada
- Jamuna as Sarala
- Gummadi as Kantha Rao
- Relangi as Ganapati
- Ramana Reddy as Govinda Rao
- Chalam as Mohan
- R. Nageswara Rao as Nannagaru
- Dr. Sivaramakrishnaiah as Mukunda Rao
- Padmanabham as Chitti
- Allu Ramalingaiah as Manager
- AS Narayana as Chandraiah
- Suryakantham as Seshamma
- Krishna Kumari as Padma
- Surabhi Kamalabai as Seshamma (in play)
- Indiracharya as Rajamma
- Parvati as Sundari
- Subhadra as Lakshmi
- Kusalakumari as Singari
- Master Varma as Ramu

== Soundtrack ==
Ilavelpu

Film score by Susarla Dakshinamurthi
- Released: 1956
- Genre: Soundtrack
- Producer: Susarla Dakshinamurthi

Music composed by Susarla Dakshinamurthi.

S. No.	Song Title	Lyrics	Singers	length
1	"Neeve Bharata Sthreelapaliti"	Sri Sri	P. Susheela	3:18
2	"Nekhila Bhuvanapaalam"	Sri Sri	P. Leela	
3	"Neemamu Veedi Agnanamuche"	Kosaraju	P. Leela	3:34
4	"Yenadu Kanaledu"	Anisetty	Raghunath Panigrahi, P. Susheela	
5	"Challani Raja O Chandamama"	Vaddadi	Raghunath Panigrahi, P. Susheela, P. Leela	6:11
6	"Swargamanna Vere Kalada"	Anisetty	P. Leela	3:52
7	"O Chinglari"	Kosaraju	P. Leela	
8	"Anna Anna Vinnava"	Anisetty	Jikki	3:37
9	"Challani Punnami Vennelalone"	Vaddadi	Susarla Dakshinamurthi, P.Susheela	
10	"Palikina Bangaru Mayavate"	Vaddadi	P. Susheela	
11	"Gampa Gaiyalli"	Kosaraju	Madhavapeddi Satyam, P. Leela	
