= Mangaiyar Thilakam =

1955 film by L. V. Prasad

- Theatrical release poster
- Directed by: L. V. Prasad
- Screenplay by: L. V. Prasad
- Story by: Shantaram Athavale (Original); V. Sadasivabrahmam (Adapted)
- Based on: Vahinchya Bangdya by Shantaram Athavale
- Produced by: Sripadha Shankar
- Starring: Sivaji Ganesan; Padmini
- Cinematography: P. L. Rai
- Edited by: N. M. Shankar
- Music by: S. Dakshinamurthi
- Production company: Vaidya Films
- Release date: 26 August 1955
- Running time: 182 minutes
- Country: India
- Language: Tamil

Mangaiyar Thilakam (transl. A Jewel Among Women) is a 1955 Indian Tamil-language drama film directed by L. V. Prasad. The film, released on 26 August 1955, was a remake of the 1953 Marathi film Vahinicha Bangadya. The film was produced by Sripadha Shankar under the banner of Vaidya Films. It stars Sivaji Ganesan and Padmini, while M. N. Rajam, S. V. Subbaiah, K. A. Thangavelu and K. Sarangapani play pivotal roles. The film's soundtrack and background score were composed by S. Dakshinamurthi, while the lyrics for the songs were written by Kannadasan, Puratchidasan, and Maruthakasi. P. L. Rai and N. M. Shankar handled cinematography and editing respectively. The story was adapted by Sadasiva Brahmam and dialogues were written by Valampuri Somanathan, G. Ramakrishnan and D. Nagalingam.

== Plot ==
The story starts with the special birthday celebration of a girl. An unusual ceremony is performed, where the child goes to perform puja at the samadhi built over a cremation site, and which is usually built at the place where a pativratha or great lady has performed sati. A friend asks about the story of the sati, and Vasudevan narrates the story after telling that this not an ordinary Sati, but an Aajeeva Sati whose whole life was a sacrifice pleasing to God, and who died not actually as a Sati but as a Muttaida/Suhagan in the lifetime of her husband after dedicating her life to family. Vasudevan begins to narrate the story.

Karunakaran and Vasudevan are brothers whose parents had died. They are very much loving and close to each other but Vasudevan longs for mother's love. Yielding to the relatives persuasion, Karunakaran accepts to marry Sulochana. Vasudevan gets upset as he is afraid of what will happen with new person and he only has got one brother, no mother no father. He sets off to the bride's house to see her and he likes her at the first glimpse because she is very nice to him.

The wedding takes place and Sulochana becomes a loving wife and the perfect home-maker because she is very traditional and she builds the family including all the mother's love for Vasudevan. The house was like "house for ghosts" because there was no wife and mother until now, but now Sulochana starts everything perfectly, regular puja, Tulsi, rangoli, toranam above door, keeping two cows, cooking proper food at proper time, lunchbox for Vasudevan, waiting for each other to come home, celebrating all the small and big festivals, keeping all the Nomu (Vrath) with fasting and feasting, and everything like that. For Vasudevan, she is the only mother he ever knew and he considers her his real mother. Sulochana gets pregnant and delivers a dead baby boy. The doctor tells Karunakaran that Sulochana will not have any more children because the delivery was complicated and he had to cut some organ to save her life. When Sulochana hears of this, she is very sad, but says, "God gave me one sweet son. Why should I ask for more?" and she pats Vasudevan lovingly on the head.

Vasudevan grows up to be a college professor. Vasudevan presents Sulochana gold bangles from his first pay. Vasudevan was arranged to marry Rao Bahadur Ponnambalam's and Akilam's daughter Prabha.

Comic relief was presented in a moral story of Ponnambalam's family. Ponnambalam listens too much to and often quarrels with Akilam. This drives Ponnambalam's son Kalamani (K. A. Thangavelu) and his wife Neela (Ragini) to hatch a drama in order for Ponnambalam and Akilam to be united and respect each other. Kalamani and Neela succeed in this.

Prabha's character was the opposite of Sulochana's, but the latter hardly bothers about this and carries on her daily good deeds. Prabha gets pregnant and delivers a baby boy, Ravi (Master Ravi), but she does not care much for him. Sulochana picks up the tasks and takes care of Ravi as a mother should. As Ravi grows, Prabha does not like this and forbids Sulochana from raising Ravi.

Ravi falls ill due to the separation and Sulochana takes care of him day and night, not bothering about her meals and health. Ravi becomes very serious for a month, till the doctor who treats him loses hope. Sulochana takes Ravi to a temple and pleads to Lord Shiva to take her life instead and spare Ravi's life. Prabha apologises to Sulochana, but the latter says that it was by the God's grace before collapsing due to being too weak. Even on her death bed, Sulochana enquires about Ravi's health. After thanking Karunakaran and Vasudevan for a good life as a daughter-in-law in the house and says that she would be reborn in this house, Sulochana dies.

Sulochana's body was cremated, but Karunakaran and Vasudevan were surprised to see the gold bangles were not damaged during the process. A baby girl was born on the exact day after a year and she was accepted by the whole family as Sulochana reborn. The gold bangles would be worn to her on every birthday, thus the special occasion.

== Cast ==
Male cast

- Sivaji Ganesan as Vasudevan
- S. V. Subbaiah as Karunakaran
- K. A. Thangavelu as Kalamani
- K. Sarangapani as Rao Bahadur Ponnambalam
- Master Baji as young Vasudevan
- Master Ravi as Ravi

Female cast

- Padmini as Sulochana
- Ragini as Neela
- M. N. Rajam as Prabha
- K. N. Kamalam as Akilandam

== Production ==
Actor Sripadha Shankar ventured into film production with Mangayar Thilakam being one of his ventures. Since he was not financially strong, he sought the help of an enterprising bank clerk, A. C. Pillai, who helped complete the film providing funds. This film was based on the Marathi film Vahininjiya Pangkadiya. Valampuri Somanathan, G. Ramakrishnan and D. Nagarajan wrote the screenplay.

== Soundtrack ==
Soundtrack was composed by S. Dakshinamurthi. The song "Neela Vanna Kannaa Vaadaa" was initially to be written by Kannadasan. As Prasad did not like what he wrote, he was replaced by A. Maruthakasi. According to historian Randor Guy, the song "Ketta Penmani" took a dig at modern women.

Song	Singers	Lyrics	Length
"Unmai Anbu Endrum Anaindhidaadha Theebam"	K. Jamuna Rani	A. Maruthakasi	03:12
"Baakkiyavathi Naan Baakkiyavathi"	P. Leela	A. Maruthakasi	03:11
"Neela Vanna Kannaa Vaadaa"	R. Balasaraswathi Devi	A. Maruthakasi	04:16
"Nee Varavillaiyenil Aadharavedhu"	M. Sathyam	A. Maruthakasi	03:25
"Purindhu Kollavillai Innum"	S. C. Krishnan & A. G. Rathnamala	A. Maruthakasi	03:16
"Kandu Konden Naan Kandu Konden"	T. Kamala	Puratchidasan	02:45
"Engal Kula Dhevi Neeye"	P. Leela	Kannadasan	02:35
"Dheva Sadhaa Soga Thirunaalaam"	P. Leela	Kannadasan	02:56
"Oru Muraidhaan Varum"	Jikki	Kannadasan	02:47
"Ketta Penmani Butthi Ketta Penmani"	T. V. Rathnam	Udumalai Narayana Kavi	02:43
"Adanga Pidaari Naadagam"	S. C. Krishnan, T. V. Rathnam; Vadivambal, K. R. Sellamuthu; S. V. Ponnusamy, and S. J. Kantha	Udumalai Narayana Kavi	09:36

== Release and reception ==
Mangaiyar Thilakam was released on 26 August 1955. Kalki said it was a good film that could not be underestimated with regards to visual combinations, cinematography, sound recording and artistic technique.
