= Manorama =

Manorama may refer to:

== People ==
- Manorama (Hindi actress) (1926–2008), Indian actress in Hindi films
- Manorama (Tamil actress) (1937–2015), Indian actress in Tamil films
- Manorama Madhwaraj (born 1940), Indian politician
- Manorama Thampuratti, 18th-century Sanskrit scholar
- Ruth Manorama (born 1952), Indian activist and politician
- Thangjam Manorama (1970–2004), Indian woman killed by a paramilitary group
- Manorama, the wife of Gopal Mukund Huddar (1902–1981), an Indian anti-colonial activist and soldier
- Manorama, fictional character in the 2007 Indian thriller film Manorama Six Feet Under

== Media ==
- Malayala Manorama, daily Malayalam-language newspaper based in Kottayam, Kerala, India
- Manorama Weekly, a Malayalam-language magazine based in Kottayam, Kerala
- Manorama Music, a music company of India
- Manorama News, a Malayalam news channel
- Radio Mango, an FM radio station in Kerala
- Onmanorama, an Indian streaming service
- ManoramaMAX, an Indian streaming service
- Manorama (1924 film), an Indian film directed by Homi Master
- Manorama (1959 film), a 1959 Telugu film
- Manorama (film), a 2009 Telugu film
