= Veturi (surname) =

Veturi (Telugu: వేటూరి) is a Telugu surname. The surname is common among Brahmins from Coastal Andhra Pradesh. Notable people with the surname include:

- Veturi Prabhakara Sastri (1888–1950), Sanskrit and Telugu pandit
- Veturi (1936–2010), Telugu cinema writer
- Vikram Veturi Director
