= Susarla =

Susarla is a Telugu surname.

It is most commonly found in India and refers to a larger trading family that traded in the historic Persian port of Bandar Abbas. Most of the name "Susarla" now live in the diaspora, although a small number remain within the vicinity of the Indian state of Andhra Pradesh.

- Susarla Dakshinamurthi, an Indian musician.
