= Veera Kankanam =

- Theatrical release poster
- Directed by: G. R. Rao
- Written by: Aarudhra (story / dialogues)
- Screenplay by: G. R. Rao
- Produced by: T. R. Sundaram
- Starring: N. T. Rama Rao; Krishna Kumari; Jamuna
- Cinematography: G. R. Nandan
- Edited by: L. Balu
- Music by: Susarla Dakshinamurthi
- Production company: Modern Theatres
- Release date: 16 May 1957
- Running time: 176 mins
- Country: India
- Language: Telugu

Veera Kankanam is a 1957 Telugu-language swashbuckler film, produced by T. R. Sundaram under the Modern Theatres banner and directed by G. R. Rao. It stars N. T. Rama Rao, Krishna Kumari, Jamuna and music composed by Susarla Dakshinamurthi. The film is a remake of the 1950 Tamil Historical fiction film Manthiri Kumari.

== Cast ==
- N. T. Rama Rao as Veera Mohan
- Krishna Kumari as Rajani
- Jamuna as Parvathi
- Jaggayya as Chandra Senudu
- Relangi as Kailasam
- Ramana Reddy as Vengallaraya Deva
- Gummadi as Rajaguru
- Peketi Sivaram as Patalam
- K. V. S. Sarma as Maha Mantri
- Girija as Champakam
- E. V. Saroja as Dancer
- Rama Devi as Kailasam's mother

== Soundtrack ==
Veera Kankanam

Film score by Susarla Dakshinamurthi
- Released: 1957
- Genre: Soundtrack
- Length: 37:27
- Producer: Susarla Dakshinamurthi

Music composed by Susarla Dakshinamurthi. Lyrics were written by Aarudhra. Music released on Audio Company.

S. No.	Song title	Singers	length
1	"Sogasari Kuluku"	Jikki	3:06
2	"Andala Rani Enduko Gaani"	A. M. Rajah, R. Balasaraswathi Devi	3:10
3	"Kattandi Veera Kankanam"	A. M. Rajah, Jikki	3:46
4	"Ika Vaayinchakoyee Murali"	P. Leela	2:54
5	"Theli Theli Naa Manasu"	Ghantasala, Jikki	3:34
6	"Hamsa Bhale Raam"	Pithapuram	3:06
7	"Siggulu Chigurinchene"	R. Balasaraswathi Devi	2:49
8	"Intikipothanu"	Pithapuram, Swarnalatha	3:04
9	"Vinave Barre Pilla"	P. Susheela	3:28
10	"Raave Raave"	Ghantasala, Jikki	2:42
11	"Annam Thinna Intike"	Pithapuram	3:02
12	"Aathmabali"	P. Leela	2:46
13	"Kalakaadhu Chelee Kaadhu"	R. Balasaraswathi Devi, Jikki	
