= Athisaya Thirudan =

1958 film

- Theatrical release poster
- Directed by: P. Pullayya
- Written by: Thanjai N. Ramaiah Dass
- Produced by: S. Bhavanarayanan; D. B. Narayanan
- Starring: Gemini Ganesan; Savitri
- Cinematography: Annaiah
- Edited by: N. S. Prakasam; R. V. Rajan
- Music by: S. Dakshinamurthi; K. Prasad Rao
- Production company: Sahini Art Productions
- Release date: 12 December 1958
- Running time: 150 minutes
- Country: India
- Language: Tamil

Athisaya Thirudan (transl. Crafty Thief) is 1958 Indian Tamil-language film directed by P. Pullayya and written by Thanjai N. Ramaiah Dass. The soundtrack was composed by S. Dakshinamurthi and K. Prasad Rao. The film stars Gemini Ganesan portraying the titular character, with Savitri, T. S. Balaiah, K. A. Thangavelu, T. P. Muthulakshmi and V. Nagayya in supporting roles.

== Cast ==
- Gemini Ganesan as Athisaya Thirudan
- Savitri as Gowri
- T. S. Balaiah as Neelakalkantam
- K. A. Thangavelu as the King
- T. P. Muthulakshmi as the Queen
- V. Nagayya as the Saint
- Baby Rajakumari as Pachai
- K. Nadarajan as Kannaiah
- K. N. Kamalam as Gowri's mother

== Soundtrack ==
Music was composed by S. Dakshinamurthi and K. Prasad Rao, with lyrics by Thanjai N. Ramaiah Dass. The song about Muruga, "Muruga Endrathum Urugaadhaa Manam", became popular.

Songs	Singers	Length
"Vaarunga Ammaa Maarey"	Jikki	02:51
"Muruga Endrathum Urugaadhaa Manam"	T. M. Soundararajan	03:40
"Ye Ammaadi Ye Ayyaadi"	T. M. Soundararajan	03:42
"Yaarenna Inimel Ketkadhey"	K. Jamuna Rani	02:39
"Kola Kolaiyaa Mundhirikkaa"	S. C. Krishnan	03:24
"Ella Vilakkum Vilakkalla"	Seerkazhi Govindarajan	0:46
"Velli Nilaave Oh Velli Nilaave"	P. Susheela	03:23
"Kokku Varnam Selaiyile"	K. Jamuna Rani & S. Janaki	03:55
"Are Machan Aavo Machan"	S. V. Ponnusamy	
"Vidinthathe Magaraja"	P. Susheela	2:56

== Reception ==
Kanthan of Kalki said Savitri performed well from the beginning to the end.
