= Edhir Paradhathu =

1954 film by Chitrapu Narayana Rao

- Theatrical release poster
- Directed by: Ch. Narayanamoorthy
- Written by: C. V. Sridhar
- Starring: Sivaji Ganesan; Padmini
- Cinematography: P. Ramaswamy
- Edited by: Ch. Narayana Moorthy; M. A. Thirumugam
- Music by: C. N. Pandurangan
- Production company: Saravanabhava Unity Pictures
- Distributed by: Bell Pictures
- Release date: 9 December 1954
- Country: India
- Language: Tamil

Edhir Paradhathu (transl. The Unexpected) is a 1954 Indian Tamil-language romantic drama film directed by Ch. Narayana Moorthy and written by C. V. Sridhar. The film stars Sivaji Ganesan and Padmini, with V. Nagayya, S. V. Sahasranamam, S. Varalakshmi and Friends Ramasamy in supporting roles. It was released on 9 December 1954, and won the National Film Award for Best Tamil Feature Film – Certificate of Merit. The film was remade in Malayalam as Nithyakanyaka (1963), in Telugu as Ilavelpu (1956) and in Hindi as Sharada (1957).

== Plot ==
Dhayaparar is a widower whose only son Sundar studies at a college in Tiruchy. Sundar is a tenant in a house in which Sumathi lives with her father. They both start liking each other and Sumathi's father agrees to their marriage. Sumathi's elder brother Doctor Gopu lives in Bangalore and is addicted to racing. Using this situation, his friend Moorthy tries to befriend Gopu's wife Nalina but she rejects his advances. Kandaswamy, working with Doctor Gopu, notices the happenings in the family and feels bad. Gopu, in order to settle a loan, borrows money from Moorthy after signing a mortgage letter. Kandaswamy takes some money from that to clear all family dues and Gopu dismisses him for that. Moorthy comes home when Nalina is alone and tries to molest her, but Kandaswamy saves her. Gopu arrives there, realises his mistake and unites with Nalini and rehires Kandaswamy. After the exams, Sundar leaves for Chennai to get his father's concurrence to marry Sumathi. After a few weeks, he writes to Sumathi's that he will be coming in a week to finalise the marriage.

Meanwhile, Sundar gets a letter from the Government providing him a two-year scholarship for higher studies in America as a reward for securing the highest marks in the state. Since it's a rare opportunity, his father consents. Sundar meets Sumathi and her father and takes their consent too and travels to America. Meanwhile, Gopu is harassed by the lenders. Unable to pay back, Gopu leaves home after writing a note to Nalina. Moorthy takes possessions of Gopu's house in lieu of his dues. Nalina comes to stay within their limited money to settle Gopu's loans. Meanwhile, the flight in which Sundar travelled crashes and newspaper reports that everyone on board died. Sumathi and her father are shocked. Dayaparar sells off his property and moves from Chennai to Tiruchy as he is unable to stay there anymore. However, Sundar survives the crash and only loses his eyesight. He is given the medical attention by a tribal family in a forest area.

Dayaparar's friend advises him to remarry to get over his sorrows as he is alone after the death of his son, to take care of his health. He meets Sumathi's father and seeks her hand for Dayaparar and mentions that all his property will be left for Sumathi after he dies as he is alone. Sumathi agrees to the marriage to support her family and settle Gopu's loans, though both her father and Nalina do not accept her plan. On the wedding day, Sumathi's father passes away, unable to see his daughter marrying an old man. That night, Dayaparar realises that his son Sundar and Sumathi were lovers earlier. Brokenhearted, he leaves home writing a letter to Sumathi in which he leaves all his wealth to her and gives her the freedom to choose a life of her own (to remarry). Dayaparar wanders around visiting temples and holy places and in one of the temples he sees Sundar begging – being blind he did not want to be burden to his father and hence was living alone. Father and Son rejoin. Gopu returns to Sumathi's house as a reformed man and starts his medical practice again. He dreams of his Sister remarrying, but Sumathi still thinks of Dayaparar as her husband.

Sundar requests his father to take him to Sumathi's house in Tiruchy. Dayaparar takes him to Tiruchy and sends him to her house alone and stays back to avoid confusion. Sundar meets and proposes to Sumathi and she informs that she is already married and agrees to be just his friend. They meet often and Sundar suggests remarrying as her husband has moved away. But Sumathi rejects saying she is still the wife of a man living somewhere. Sundar informs this to his father. Dayaparar feels guilty and in order to unite them sends a false letter to her starting that Dayaparar had died in an accident. Now, Sumathi starts living like a widow. On a rainy night, Sundar meets Sumathi at her home, holds her hand and tries to get her consent to marry him, now that her husband has died.

Sumathi gets angry and slaps him for trying to take advantage of her situation and makes it clear that in her life there is place only for Dayaparar. Sundar is shocked at her rejection. Gopu learns about Sundar's situation and operates on Sundar's eyes and he gets back in eyesight. Gopu takes Sundar to his house to unite him with Sumathi. Reaching there, Sundar is shocked to see the portrait of his father with a garland and realises that Sumathi has actually married his father and is now his stepmother. He feels guilty and rushes to apologise to his father, but it was too late as Dayaparar has died. Sumathi and her family are shocked to learn that Sundar's father was Dayaparar. Dayaparar had left a letter to Sumathi in which he apologises for marrying her and asks Sumathi to live on her own terms. Sumathi reconciles herself to live as a mother to Sundar than remarrying and he also appreciates that and calls her as his mother. Sundar goes abroad to continue his studies with his stepmother's blessings.

== Cast ==
Male cast

- Sivaji Ganesan as Sundar
- V. Nagayya as Dhayabharar
- S. V. Sahasranamam as Gopu
- Friend Ramasamy as Compounder Kandasamy
- K. Duraisami as Sumathi’s father
- Ashokan as Mothi
- Narayanasami as Kittu
- M. R. Santhanam as Broker
- N. S. Ponnusami as Doctor Ponnusami
- T. K. Ramasamy as Sundar’s friend

Male support cast

- Shanmugam Pillai, N. Shankaramoorthi, Stunt Krishnan, K. N. Venkataraman, Peer Kannu, Balaraman, T. S. Venkat, Harihara Bhagavathar, Shankar, Srinivasan, Krishnamoorthi,

Female cast

- Padmini as Sumathi
- S. Varalakshmi as Nalini
- Baby Saraswathi as Asha
- Angamuthu as Patient’s wife

Female support cast

- Kamala, Rajeswari, Kanakambujam, Chandrakala.

== Production ==
The film was shot at Jupiter Studios, which was then under lease to Jupiter Pictures, and Saravanabhava and Unity Pictures produced the film. Art direction was by A. K. Sekhar. M. A. Thirumugam was then an assistant editor attached to the studio. In the scene where Padmini had to slap Sivaji, she became involved in her character, went hysterical and slapped him continuously; finally Sivaji made her lie down and made her back to normal.

== Soundtrack ==
The music was composed by C. N. Pandurangan.

| Song | Singers | Lyrics | Length |
|---|---|---|---|
| "Sirpi Sedhukkaadha Porchilaiye" | Jikki | K. P. Kamadshisundaram | 02:53 |
| "Madhuraapuri Aalum Magaraaniye" | P. Leela | KanagaSurabhi | 02:37 |
| "Kaadhal Vaazhvil Naane" | A. M. Rajah & Jikki | K. S. Gopalakrishnan | 02:46 |
| "Jegam Ezhum Neeye Amma" | (Radha) Jayalakshmi | KanagaSurabhi | 02:28 |
| "Thirumuruga Endru Oru Tharam Sonnaal" | V. Nagayya | KanagaSurabhi | 02:47 |
| "Kannaana Kaadhalar Kaaleju Manavar" | Jikki | KanagaSurabhi | 03:19 |
| "Sirpi Sedhukkaadha Porchilaiye" | A. M. Rajah | K. P. Kamadshisundaram | 02:53 |
| "Thinnu Paartthu Theerppu Sollunga" | K. R. Chellamuthu | K. S. Gopalakrishnan | 02:29 |
| "Vandhadhu Vasandham Vandhadhu" | A. M. Rajah & Jikki | KanagaSurabhi | 03:54 |
| "Thiruchendhoor Aandavane Muruga" | V. Nagayya | Papanasam Sivan | 03:50 |

== Reception ==
The film was a commercial success, running for over 100 days in theatres. It won the National Film Award for Best Tamil Feature Film – Certificate of Merit in 1954 at the 2nd National Film Awards.

== Remakes ==
The film was remade in Malayalam as Nithyakanyaka (1963), in Telugu as Ilavelpu (1956), and in Hindi as Sharada (1957).

== Bibliography ==
- Ganesan, Sivaji; Narayana Swamy, T. S. (2007) [2002]. Autobiography of an Actor: Sivaji Ganesan, October 1928 – July 2001. Sivaji Prabhu Charities Trust. OCLC 297212002.
