= Thayilla Pillai =

1961 film by L. V. Prasad

- Theatrical release poster
- Directed by: L. V. Prasad
- Screenplay by: M. Karunanidhi
- Story by: S. R. Pinisetty
- Produced by: A. Anand; L. V. Prasad
- Starring: T. S. Balaiah; M. V. Rajamma
- Cinematography: K. S. Prasad
- Edited by: A. Sanjeevi
- Music by: K. V. Mahadevan
- Production company: Prasad Movies
- Distributed by: Gemini Studios
- Release date: 18 August 1961
- Running time: 173 minutes
- Country: India
- Language: Tamil

Thayilla Pillai (transl. The Motherless Child) is a 1961 Indian Tamil-language drama film directed and co-produced by L. V. Prasad and written by M. Karunanidhi from a story by S. R. Pinisetty. The film stars T. S. Balaiah and M. V. Rajamma, with G. Muthukrishnan, Kalyan Kumar, S. Rama Rao, Manohar, L. Vijayalakshmi, Madhuri Roy, Sandhya and T. P. Muthulakshmi in supporting roles. It revolves around a mother torn between her love for her orthodox Brahmin husband and her son.

Thayilla Pillai speaks against the caste system in India. It was co-produced by A. Anand, photographed by K. S. Prasad, and edited by A. Sanjeevi. The film was released on 18 August 1961 and became a commercial success, running for over 100 days in theatres. It was remade in Malayalam as Pravaham (1975).

== Plot ==
The conservative Brahmin Pathanjali Sasthri severs relations with his modern brother-in-law Bharathi, a doctor. When Sasthri's wife Parvathi, who had two miscarriages, finds herself pregnant, she goes to her brother to get medical aid and incurs the displeasure of her husband. The wife gives birth to a son but simultaneously adopts the son of a lower-caste woman who died in childbirth, creating some confusion for Sasthri as to which baby is his son. Eventually the couple raise the adopted child while their biological son becomes a rickshaw-puller. The two boys grow up and become friends. In the end, the family reunites.

== Cast ==
Male cast

- T. S. Balaiah as Pathanjali Sasthri
- G. Muthukrishnan as Shankar
- Kalyan Kumar as Somu
- S. Rama Rao as Rangu
- Manohar as Doctor Bharathi
- Nagesh as Mohan
- Dhakshinamoorthi
- Rajamohan
- C. V. V. Panthulu as Gurumoorthi Pillai
- Senthamarai as Ponnan

Female cast

- M. V. Rajamma as Parvathi
- L. Vijayalakshmi as Suguna
- Madhuri Roy as Chandra
- Sandhya as Sushila
- T. P. Muthulakshmi as Gangamma

== Production ==
Thayilla Pillai was directed by L. V. Prasad and produced by A. Anand under Prasad Movies. Although Prasad was the co-producer, he was not listed as such in the opening credits. The screenplay was written by M. Karunanidhi, based on a story by S. R. Pinisetty. Cinematography was handled by K. S. Prasad, art direction by Thotta, and the editing by A. Sanjeevi. The final length of the film was 15,567 feet (4,745 m).

== Themes ==
Like many films Karunanidhi wrote, Thayilla Pillai reflects his political ideology. It speaks against the caste system in India, and the problem of "orphan children". Karunanidhi said that, through the character of Pathanjali Sasthri, he portrayed "how casteist feelings, age-old customs and rituals and superstitious beliefs had been deeply entrenched in the human psyche for generations."

== Soundtrack ==
The soundtrack was composed by K. V. Mahadevan. The songs "Chinna Chinna Ooraniyam", "Kaalam Maruthu Karuthu Maruthu" and "Kadavulum Naanum Oru Jaathi" attained popularity.

Songs	Singers	Lyrics	Length
"Cheeradum Painkiliyae"	R. Balasaraswathi Devi	Kothamangalam Subbu	04:16
"Chinna Chinna Ooraniyam"	Soolamangalam Rajalakshmi	Kannadasan	03:47
"Vaamma Vaamma Chinnamma"	Sirkazhi Govindarajan, P. Susheela	Kannadasan	04:30
"Kaalam Maruthu Karuthu Maruthu"	A. L. Raghavan, L. R. Eswari	Kannadasan	04:16
"Kadavulum Naanum Oru Jaathi"	A. L. Raghavan	Kannadasan	04:10
"Padikka Vendum Pudhiya Paadam"	P. B. Sreenivas, K. Jamuna Rani	A. Maruthakasi	04:25
"Oorar Aadithuvittar"	T. M. Soundararajan	Kannadasan	03:57
"Thotta Kaigal"	P. Susheela	Kannadasan	03:32
"Chinna Chinna Ooraniyam" – 2	R. Balasaraswathi Devi	Kannadasan	02:02

== Release and reception ==
Thayilla Pillai was released on 18 August 1961, and distributed by Gemini Studios. The Indian Express applauded the film, particularly Balaiah's performance, saying he "outshines all others in the cast". The reviewer also praised Rama Rao and Muthulakshmi for providing "good comic relief", and director Prasad for being able to "blend comedy and emotion so well". The film was commercially successful, running for over 100 days in theatres, and became a milestone for "touch[ing] on caste" in that period. It was later remade in Malayalam as Pravaham (1975).

== Bibliography ==
- Narwekar, Sanjit (1994). Directory of Indian Film-makers and Films. Flicks Books. ISBN 978-0-948911-40-8. OCLC 924860434.
- Rajadhyaksha, Ashish; Willemen, Paul (1998) [1994]. Encyclopaedia of Indian Cinema. British Film Institute and Oxford University Press. ISBN 0-19-563579-5.
- Rathinagiri, R. (2007). Time capsule of Kalaignar. Dravida Munnetra Kazhagam. OCLC 233030854.
- Thoraval, Yves (2000). The cinemas of India. India: Macmillan Publishers. ISBN 978-0-333-93410-4. OCLC 315628673.
