= Pangaaligal =

- Directed by: G. Ramakrishnan
- Written by: M. S. Solaimalai
- Produced by: T. Kanmani; C. K. Kannan; P. Rangasamy Reddiar
- Starring: M. R. Radha; Gemini Ganesan; Anjali Devi; Devika
- Music by: S. Dakshinamurthi
- Production company: Iris Movies
- Release date: 16 December 1961
- Country: India
- Language: Tamil

Pangaaligal (transl. Partners) is a 1961 Indian Tamil-language film directed by G. Ramakrishna. The film stars Gemini Ganesan, M. R. Radha, Anjali Devi and Devika. It was released on 16 December 1961.

== Plot ==
Three poor men (Ranga Rao, Sarangapani and Muthaiah) get together, form a partnership and establish a metal vessel factory. Rao gets hold of the authority and make the other two as wage earners. Rao's son (Radha) goes abroad for studies and comes back as a fully westernised man. He marries the daughter (Anjali Devi) of one of the wage earners as agreed upon earlier. But he is not interested in her and ill-treats her. The son of that wage earner (Gemini Ganesan) goes to Malaysia to learn a trade. When he returns he finds that his sister is married to Radha and undergoes ill-treatment. The other wage earner had two daughters. One of them, (Devika) went missing during a festival and was brought up by a railway porter (Durairaj and family). They make her a dancer so as to exploit rich men. They get hold of Radha. The other daughter (Saroja) and Ganesan become lovers. The porter's family swindles all the wealth from Radha and he is reduced to living in a hut. He realises his folly. Ganesan helps to sort things out and all ends well.

== Cast ==
The list is compiled from The Hindu review article and from the book Thiraikalanjiyam.

Male cast

- Gemini Ganesan as Ponnaiya
- M. R. Radha as Selvaraj
- S. V. Ranga Rao as Thiruvasagam
- K. Sarangapani as Kannayiram
- T. S. Muthaiah as Marudhamuthu

Male cast (contd.)

- T. S. Durairaj as Nadesa Pillai
- Karikol Raju as Nagalingam
- K. Sayeeram
- Gemini Balu
- Sandow Krishnan

Female cast

- Anjali Devi as Meenatchi
- Devika as Rani/Kamalam
- E. V. Saroja as Valli
- K. Malathi as Ponnamma
- P. S. Gnanam

== Production ==
The film was produced by T. Kanmani, C. K. Kannan and P. Rangasami Reddiar under the banner Iris Movies. M. S. Solaimalai wrote the screenplay and dialogues while the film was directed by G. Ramakrishna who is a nephew of K. Ramnoth.

== Soundtrack ==
Music was composed by S. Dakshinamurthi.

| Song | Singer/s | Lyricist | Duration |
|---|---|---|---|
| "Chinna Arumbu Malarum" | P. Susheela | A. Maruthakasi | 04:50 |
| "Chinna Arumbu Malarum" | Thiruchi Loganathan | A. Maruthakasi | 03:00 |
| "Nee Engu Irundha Podhum" | P. Susheela | A. Maruthakasi | 01:32 |
| "Kadhavu Thirandhathenru Varugiraan" | T. M. Soundararajan | Kannadasan | 05:11 |
| "Ethanai Naal Kaathirundhen" | P. Susheela & P. B. Seenivas | Kannadasan | 03:22 |
| "Nee Endhan Pillai" | P. Susheela | Kannadasan | 02:59 |
| "Chinna Vayathil Anbu Kondu" | P. Susheela & K. Jamuna Rani | Ku. Ma. Krishnan | 03:04 |

== Release and reception ==
Pangaaligal was released on 16 December 1961. On 22 December, The Indian Express said, "A host of characters swarm around the story with little apparent purpose. But some of the roles, such as that of Anjali, S. V. Ranga Rao, Gemini Ganesh and a few others are acted well enough for their irrelevance to be overlooked".
