= Dhanurvidya Vilasamu =

Sanskrit treatise

Dhanurvidya Vilasamu or Dhanurvidyāvilāsamu (Telugu: ధనుర్విద్యా విలాసము) is a treatise about the ancient science of Dhanurvidya or Dhanurveda (Archery). It is originally written by Krishnamacharya in Sanskrit.

It is, translated, edited and introduced into Telugu by Veturi Prabhakara Sastry and published in 1950 by Government Oriental Manuscripts Library, Madras.

== Content ==
1. Gurusankīrtana
2. Siśyaraņa
3. Vidyāprabhāsuchena
4. Sakhandākhanda Kōdanḍadwaya-namōddēśa.
5. Dhanurnirmāṇa-pramāṇapramukuha- viśāśavinibhaga
6. Mārgaṇaparigaņaņa-préņana
7. Thadvīdhānamāna-praśamsa
8. Punyōpasankhyāna
9. Paksaparimanapraśamsa
10. Nishangaracaņapravacana
11. Mourvidhānakadhana
12. Anguļithrāņaprakīrtana
13. Jyārōpaņaprõkaraņa
14. Dhanururdvādhara-béāgavinibhāga
15. Musṭiprakaraṇa
16. Sthānōpasankhyna
17. Saragrahaṇahastapratipādana
18. Sandhānakramavivaraṇa
19. Ākarśaṇahasta Prastavana
20. Bānahaśtaksetra
21. Dṛsțilaksaņānvīkśana
22. Dhanurākarśaņa kowśala
23. Saravyāpārayōgya tidhivāratārāka karaṇa
24. Khuralikāranga
25. Rangapravēša
26. Dhanussarapūjāyôyena
27. Gurupraņāma
28. Saraśarīsanagrahana paryātocona
29. Pousyaparya
30. Lakśyasuddhi
31. Lakśyavēdika
32. Nārācamõcena
33. Citralakşyabhēdhanōpāya
34. Śabdalakşyasarād byāsa
35. Muştyanguļaniya manalaksananveksana
36. Duranikatosthala laksanalaskya
37. Radharohaṇa
38. Gazaróhapņasaratira yöga
39. Hayarohana
40. Śarābyasa
41. Dūrāpāti
42. Śaraprayogasamayā samaya
43. Śaragamanagunadōşa
44. Divryāstramantra tantraprayōga
45. Vistaraprastāvana
