= Bagyavathi =

- Theatrical release poster
- Directed by: L. V. Prasad
- Written by: Ra. Ve
- Produced by: A. C. Pillai
- Starring: Sivaji Ganesan; Padmini
- Cinematography: P. L. Roy
- Edited by: A. Sanjeevi
- Music by: S. Dakshinamurthi
- Production company: Ravi Productions
- Distributed by: Subbu & Co.
- Release date: 27 December 1957
- Country: India
- Language: Tamil

Bagyavathi is a 1957 Indian Tamil-language crime drama film directed by L. V. Prasad and written by Ra. Ve, starring Sivaji Ganesan, Padmini and M. N. Rajam. It was released on 27 December 1957.

== Plot ==
Somu, who is a criminal, marries Meena. Unable to expose Somu because of her love and devotion to him, she tries to transform him. In a separate storyline, Ravi, a six-year-old boy, learns that his father Suppanna is a criminal, and leaves his home. Suppanna also has a daughter, Bhama, who fails in her attempts to reform her father's ways. As a result, she kills herself.

== Cast ==
Male cast

- Sivaji Ganesan as Somu
- K. A. Thangavelu as Shankaran
- K. Sarangapani as Ramasami
- Boopathi Nandaram as Subbanna
- P. D. Sambandam as Saminathan
- Master Gopal as Ravi

Female

- Padmini as Meena
- Ragini as Suguna
- M. N. Rajam as Bama
- Lakshmi Prabha as Velammal
- K. N. Kamalam as Sooravalli
- K. Aranganayaki as Somu's mother

Supporting cast

- C. P. Kittan, V. P. S. Mani, Basupathi, V. T. Kalyanam, Santhanam, Ponnusami, Kunjitham Pillai, Jayasakthivel, G. V. Sharma, Shankaramoorthi, Therur Murugan, Kannan, Late Balaraman, Nanjilseth, Subbaraman, Rathnam, Sami & Party, P. R. Chandra, Seethalakshmi, and Kaurava Nathakar Sivasooryan.

== Production ==
A.C. Pillai, who was a small-time bank clerk-turned-film producer, made this film. It was written by Ra. Venkatachalam under the abbreviated "Ra. Ve". P. L. Rai was the cinematographer and the audiography was handled by A. Krishnan. The film was produced at Vijaya Vauhini Studios.

== Soundtrack ==
The music was composed by S. Dakshinamurthi. The song "Kannale Vettadhe" was well received.

Song	Singers	Lyrics	Length
"Vennilavin Oli Thanile"	A. M. Rajah, T. V. Rathnam & S. C. Krishnan	Subbu Arumugam	05:15
"Pombalainga Therinju Kollanum"	S. C. Krishnan	A. Maruthakasi	03:08
"Ellorum Unnai Nallavan Endre"	R. Balasaraswathi Devi	A. Maruthakasi	03:27
"Dhinasari En Vaazhvil Thirunaale"	R. Balasaraswathi Devi	A. Maruthakasi	01:30
"Vaazhvedhu Nal Vaazhvedhu"	C. S. Jayaraman	A. Maruthakasi	03:31
"Kannale Vettadhe Summaa Kannale Vettadhe"	S. C. Krishnan & T. V. Rathnam	A. Maruthakasi	03:19
"Arumbu Malarndhu Asaindhu Aadum"	Soolamangalam Rajalakshmi	A. Maruthakasi	02:59
"Asai Kiliye Azhagu Chilaiye"	P. Leela	A. Maruthakasi	03:16

== Release and reception ==
Bagyavathi was released on 27 December 1957. The film was distributed by Subbu & Co in Madras. Film historian Randor Guy noted, "In spite of the stellar cast, interesting storyline and fine direction, the film did not do well".
