= Sharada (1957 film) =

- Poster
- Directed by: L. V. Prasad
- Written by: Vishwamitter Adil
- Screenplay by: Inder Raj Anand
- Story by: V. Sadasivabrahmam; Pinisetty
- Produced by: L. V. Prasad
- Starring: Raj Kapoor; Meena Kumari
- Cinematography: M. W. Mukadam
- Edited by: Shivaji Awdhut
- Music by: C. Ramchandra
- Production company: Prasad Productions
- Distributed by: Prasad Productions
- Release date: 1 March 1957
- Country: India
- Language: Hindi

Sharada is a 1957 Indian Hindi-language film directed by L. V. Prasad. The film stars Raj Kapoor and Meena Kumari. The music was composed by C. Ramchandra.

The film did "above average" business and was the ninth-highest-grossing film at the Indian Box Office in 1957. It is a remake of 1954 Tamil film Edhir Paradhathu. Although that year Nargis was awarded Filmfare Best Actress Award for Mother India, Kumari was awarded the Best Actress award by the Bengal Film Journalists' Association Awards. Raj Kapoor and Meena Kumari later worked together in Char Dil Char Rahen (1959).

== Plot ==
Shekhar, also called Chiranjeev, is a wealthy young man who lives with his father, Kashiram and three siblings: two sisters, one of whom is dumb, and a younger brother. While on a trip, one of his friends, Mohan, falls ill due to alcohol and is treated at an Ashram. This is where Shekhar meets an employee, Sharada, who is poor and lives with her father, Ram Sharan. Shekhar and Sharada fall in love with each other and he promises to get his father's permission and return to marry her. On his way home he has an accident and though he does survive after being treated by tribal people, he returns to the Ashram several days later and is informed that Sharada is now married to a wealthy and much older man. Heart-broken and devastated, Shekhar returns home only to get another shock: the man Sharada has married is none other than his very own father. Depressed and deeply frustrated, he takes to alcohol in a big way. Sharada talks him out of this, he repents and on her insistence, marries Chanchal, who comes from a reputed family. Things then get complicated when Chanchal finds that her husband and his stepmother had been in love before and may not have gotten over their feelings for each other.

== Cast ==
- Raj Kapoor as Shekhar alias Chiranjeev
- Meena Kumari as Sharada
- Shyama as Chanchal
- Anita Guha as Padma
- Agha as Ganesh
- Gope as Hukamdas
- Raj Mehra as Kashiram
- Randhir as Munim
- Manorama as Laajo
- Vinod Mehra as Shekhar's Brother
- Rajan Haksar as Gurudev
- W. M. Khan
- Mirajkar
- Uma Khosla as Padma
- Baby Sultana as young Sharada
- Om Prakash as Mohan

Dance

Sai-Subbalaxmi as Tribal Dancers / Singers

== Awards ==
- Filmfare Best Supporting Actor Award - Raj Mehra
- Filmfare Best Supporting Actress Award - Shyama
- Filmfare Best Editing Award - Shivaji Awdhut

== Music ==
The music is composed by C. Ramchandra, with lyrics authored by Rajinder Krishan.

| Song | Singer |
|---|---|
| "Jap Jap Jap Jap Jap Re" | Mukesh |
| "Chahe Zindagi Se" | Manna Dey |
| "Duniya Ne Mujhko" | Manna Dey |
| "Raghupati Raghav"-1 | Lata Mangeshkar |
| "Raghupati Raghav"-2 | Lata Mangeshkar |
| "O Chand" | Lata Mangeshkar, Asha Bhosle |
| "Joru Ka Ghulam" | Asha Bhosle, Shamshad Begum |
| "Achha Hai Mauka" | Asha Bhosle, C. Ramchandra |
| "Aajure Baju Naju" | Asha Bhosle |
| "Lehraye Jiya" | Asha Bhosle |
