= Sarvadhikari (film) =

1951 film by T. R. Sundaram

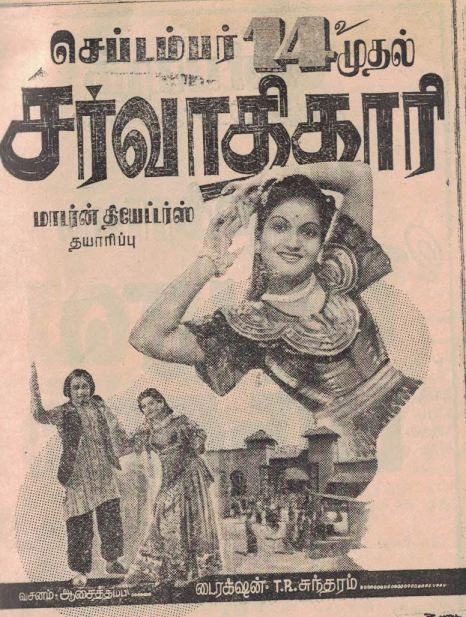
- Theatrical release poster
- Directed by: T. R. Sundaram
- Written by: A. V. P. Asai Thambi (dialogues)
- Screenplay by: Ko. Dha. Shanmugasundaram
- Story by: Ko. Dha. Shanmugasundaram
- Produced by: T. R. Sundaram
- Starring: M. G. Ramachandran; Anjali Devi
- Cinematography: M. Masthan; G. R. Nathan
- Edited by: L. Balu
- Music by: S. Dakshinamurthi
- Production company: Modern Theatres
- Release date: 14 September 1951
- Running time: 176 minutes
- Country: India
- Language: Tamil

Sarvadhikari (English: Dictator) is a 1951 Indian Tamil-language historical adventure film starring M. G. Ramachandran and Anjali Devi, with M. N. Nambiar as the antagonist. It established Nambiar as a major star. The film is based on the 1948 American film The Gallant Blade. It was dubbed in Telugu under the same title.

== Plot ==
Mahavarman, an ambitious minister with designs to topple the puppet ruler of the kingdom of Manipuri, finds the popularity of the commander-in-chief and his bodyguard Prathapan a stumbling block. He sends a young woman named Meena Devi to seduce Prathapan, but she falls in love with him. After several twists and turns, Mahavarman is exposed and felled in an duel with Prathapan. Ugrasenar is chosen as the first president while Prathapan is appointed as the new commander in chief. The kingdom of Manipuri then becomes a republic.

== Cast ==
Cast according to the opening credits of the film

Male cast

- M. G. Ramachandran as Prathapan
- V. Nagayya as Ugrasenar
- M. N. Nambiar as Mahavarman
- Pulimoottai Ramasami as King
- A. Karunanidhi as Vairagyam
- S. M. Thirupathisami
- V. K. Ramasamy as Baladev
- S. S. Sivasooriyan
- K. K. Soundar as Mohan
- M. A. Chinnappa

Female cast

- Anjali Devi as Meena Devi
- M. Saroja as Karpagam
- Jayalakshmi
- S. R. Janaki
- Angamuthu
- Muthulakshmi as Pooncholai

Dance

- Kumari Kamala

== Soundtrack ==
The music composed by S. Dakshinamurthi.

All the tunes for all the songs for both languages are the same.

=== Tamil Songs ===
Song	Singers	Lyrics	Length
"Kannaalan Varuvaar Kann Munne"	P. Leela	A. Maruthakasi	03:23
"Aanazhagaa Enadhu Kaigal Seidha"	Thiruchi Loganathan & P. Leela		03:06
"Aandiyai.... Puvi Mele Padhavigalaiye"	P. Leela		02:59
"O Raiyaarammaa Sogusaaga"	P. A. Periyanayaki		07:06
"Alliyin Mun Vennila Vandhadhai"	P. Leela		02:22
"Jaakradhaiyaa Jaakradhai"	S. Dakshinamurthi & U. R. Chandra		02:27
"Sandai Theerndhu Pochu"	S. Dakshinamurthi		02:20
"Thadavi Paartthu Nallaa Irundhaa"	S. Dakshinamurthi & P. A. Periyanayaki		04:11
"Panjamum... Namma Patthu Varusham"	T. M. Soundararajan		02:28
"Karumbin Inimai Kaadhal Pechu"			01:08
"Theedhu Seiyum Koottam Endre"	P. Leela		02:45

=== Sarvadhikari Telugu Songs ===
Song	Singers	Length
"Andhala Naa Raju Nannele Ratiraaju"	P. Leela	03:23
"Sundarudaa Naa Chetula Punyamademo"	S. Dakshinamurthi & P. Leela	03:06
"Aasalanni Koolipoye Premalatalu	P. Leela	02:59
"O Rayya Rara O Rayya Rara"	P. Leela	07:06
"Vetike Puvvu Teevele Yeduraayenoyi"	P. Leela	02:22
"Jagrattoyi Jagratha Jagrattoyi Nee"	S. Dakshinamurthi & P. Leela	02:27
"Poru Teeripoye Janmabhoomilo"	T. M. Soundararajan & Thiruchi Loganathan	02:20
"Saruku Choosi Baguntene Dabbuliyyandee"	S. Dakshinamurthi & P. Leela	04:11
"Pedhalu Rogulu Leni Desam"	T. M. Soundararajan	02:28
"Naaṇyamaina Attar Baabu"	S. Dakshinamurthi & P. Leela	01:08
"Pedhane Rajugaa Chestaan"	P. Leela	02:45
