= Marakka Mudiyuma? =

- Theatrical release poster
- Directed by: Murasoli Maran
- Screenplay by: M. Karunanidhi
- Produced by: Murasoli Maran
- Starring: S. S. Rajendran; Devika; R. Muthuraman; Kanchana
- Cinematography: Amirtham
- Edited by: R. Devarajan
- Music by: T. K. Ramamoorthy
- Production company: Mekala Pictures
- Release date: 12 August 1966
- Country: India
- Language: Tamil

Marakka Mudiyuma? (transl. Can I Forget?) is a 1966 Indian Tamil-language drama film produced and directed by Murasoli Maran, and written by his uncle M. Karunanidhi. A remake of the Telugu film Santhanam (1955), it stars S. S. Rajendran, Devika, R. Muthuraman and Kanchana, with Cho, S. V. Sahasranamam Major Sundarrajan and S. A. Natarajan in supporting roles. The film was released on 12 August 1966.

== Plot ==
Three siblings are separated from their blind father and each other after a tragic family accident. Believing they are orphans, they grow up independently, enduring harsh circumstances—working as a theater group manager, a wrestler, and a maid—before their paths eventually cross in adulthood, leading to an emotional quest to find their father and reunite their broken family.

== Cast ==
- S. S. Rajendran
- Devika
- R. Muthuraman
- Kanchana
- Cho
- S. V. Sahasranamam
- Major Sundarrajan
- K. Sarangapani
- S. A. Natarajan
- A. Karunanidhi
- S. N. Lakshmi
- Master Prabhakar
- T. K. S. Natarajan
- Master Sridhar
- Baby Kanchana
- Thirupathisamy
- Vijayarani
- Suryakala

== Production ==
Marakka Mudiyuma? is a remake of the Telugu film Santhanam (1955). It was the only film featuring a script by M. Karunanidhi in which Devika acted. The film was produced and directed by Karunanidhi's nephew Murasoli Maran.

== Soundtrack ==
Music was by T. K. Ramamoorthy.

Song	Singer	Lyrics	Length
"Kaagitha Odam Kadalalai Meley"	P. Susheela	Mu. Karunanidhi	03:24
"Kaagitha Odam Kadalalai Meley"	T. M. Soundararajan, P. Susheela	Mu. Karunanidhi	03:30
"Onnu Kodutha"	T. M. Soundararajan, P. Susheela	Tiruchy Thyagarajan	03:23
"Vasantha Kaalam Varumo"	K. J. Yesudas, P. Susheela	Suratha	04:31
"Vaanum Nilavum Veedu"	A. L. Raghavan	Mayavanathan	03:44

== Reception ==
Kalki appreciated the film for its cinematography, and Karunanidhi's story/dialogues.
