= Banda Ramudu =

1959 film

- Theatrical release poster
- Directed by: P. Pullayya
- Written by: Acharya Aatreya
- Screenplay by: P. Pullayya
- Produced by: D. B. Narayana; S. Bhavanarayana
- Starring: N. T. Rama Rao; Savitri
- Cinematography: Annayya
- Edited by: M. S. Prakasham; R. V. Rajan
- Music by: Susarla Dakshinamurthi; K Prasada Rao
- Production company: Sahini Art Productions
- Release date: 6 November 1959
- Running time: 126 minutes
- Country: India
- Language: Telugu

Banda Ramudu is a 1959 Indian Telugu-language film directed by P. Pullayya. The film stars N. T. Rama Rao, Savitri and music composed by Susarla Dakshinamurthi & NDV Prasada Rao. It was produced by DB Narayana and S. Bhavanarayana under the Sahini Art Productions banner. It was released on 6 November 1959.

== Cast ==
- N. T. Rama Rao as Banda Ramudu
- Savitri as Gouri
- Nagayya
- Rajanala
- Relangi
- Ramana Reddy
- Peketi Sivaram
- Chadalavada
- Balakrishna
- Suryakantham
- Hemalatha
- Rajasree as Kanakam
- Tilakam

== Music ==
Music was composed by Susarla Dakshinamurthi and K Prasada Rao. Music was released by His Master's Voice.

| S. No. | Song title | Lyrics | Singers | length |
|---|---|---|---|---|
| 1 | "Rara Ika" | arudhra | P. Susheela | 3:09 |
| 2 | "Meluko Maharaja" | arudhra | P. Susheela | 2:56 |
| 3 | "Poolamma Poolu" | aarudhra | Jikki | 2:58 |
| 4 | "Rakarakala Poolu" | | Pithapuram | 1:50 |
| 5 | "Radha Mohana" | Jampana | Ghantasala | 3:10 |
| 6 | "Yevarani" | arudhra | K. Jamuna Rani | 2:27 |
| 7 | "Merabuchi Donga" | | Madhavapeddi Satyam | 1:36 |
| 8 | "Okasari Aaguma" | aatreya | P. Susheela | 3:42 |
| 9 | "Mallipoola Rangayya" | | S. Janaki & K. Jamuna Rani | 3:53 |
| 10 | "Daagudu Moothi" | aatreya | | 3:38 |
