= Samsaram (1950 film) =

1950 Indian Telugu-language drama film

- Theatrical release poster
- Directed by: L. V. Prasad
- Screenplay by: L. V. Prasad
- Story by: Vempati Sadasivabrahmam
- Produced by: K. V. Krishna; C. V. Ranganatha Das
- Starring: N. T. Rama Rao; Akkineni Nageswara Rao; Lakshmirajyam
- Cinematography: B. Subba Rao; M. A. Rehman
- Music by: Susarla Dakshinamurthi
- Production company: Sadhana Productions
- Release date: 29 December 1950
- Running time: 219 minutes
- Country: India
- Language: Telugu

Samsaram (transl. Family) is a 1950 Indian Telugu-language drama film directed by L. V. Prasad. It stars N. T. Rama Rao, Akkineni Nageswara Rao and Lakshmirajyam, with music composed by Susarla Dakshinamurthi. It was produced by K. V. Krishna and C. V. Ranganatha Dasu under the Sadhana Productions banner. The film was recorded as a Blockbuster at the box office. The film was later remade in Tamil with the same name, in Hindi as Sansar and in Malayalam as Ayodhya (1975).

== Cast ==
- Nandamuri Taraka Rama Rao as Raghu
- Akkineni Nageshwara Rao as Venu
- Lakshmirajyam as Manjula
- Relangi as Tataram
- Doraiswamy as Doctor
- Dr. Damodaram as Sundara Rao
- Nalla Ram Murthy as Manager Ramesh
- Suryakantham as Seshamma
- Pushpalata as Kamala
- Surabhi Balasaraswati as Kamakshi
- Bezawada Kanthamma as Venkamma
- Master Anand as Gopi
- Baby Aruna

== Music ==
Samsaram

Film score by Susarla Dakshinamurthi
- Released: 1950
- Genre: Soundtrack
- Label: SAREGAMA Audio
- Producer: Susarla Dakshinamurthi

Music was composed by Susarla Dakshinamurthi. The song Samsaram Samsaram is a memorable melody song. Music released on SAREGAMA Audio Company. The title song "Samsaram Samsaram" is inspired from the song "Yeh Zindagi Ke Mele" from the 1948 film Mela, sung by Mohammed Rafi.

| S. No. | Song title | Lyrics | Singers | length |
|---|---|---|---|---|
| 1 | "Samsaram Samsaram" | Vempati Sadasivabrahmam | Ghantasala | 2:40 |
| 2 | "Amma Akale Babu Akale" | Kondamudi Gopala Raya Sarma | Sarojini | |
| 3 | "Amma Sri Thulasi" | Vempati Sadasivabrahmam | P. Leela | 3:35 |
| 4 | "Andala Chandamama" | Vempati Sadasivabrahmam | Ghantasala | 2:50 |
| 5 | "Asha Ika Lene Ledemo" | Kondamudi Gopala Raya Sarma | P. Leela | |
| 6 | "Chitramainadi Vidhi" | Vempati Sadasivabrahmam | Suvarna Dakshina Murthy | 2:14 |
| 7 | "Jo Jo Yedavaku" | Vempati Sadasivabrahmam | P. Leela | 3:13 |
| 8 | "Itupai Naa Gatemileda" | Kondamudi Gopala Raya Sarma | P. Leela | 3:18 |
| 9 | "Kala Nijamayega" | Vempati Sadasivabrahmam | Jikki | 3:01 |
| 10 | "Naa Maata Vinave" | Vempati Sadasivabrahmam | Susarla Dakshinamurthi, Satyavathi | |
| 11 | "Nagubatukada" | Kondamudi Gopala Raya Sarma | Susarla Dakshinamurthi | 3:01 |
| 12 | "Taku Taku Tamakula Bandi" | Vempati Sadasivabrahmam | Ghantasala, Jikki | 2:56 |
| 13 | "Darunamee" | Vempati Sadasivabrahmam | Ghantasala | 1:20 |

== Box office ==
The film ran for more than 100 days in 11 centers, celebrated a Silver Jubilee and ran for 224 days in Madras.
