= Pravaham =

- Directed by: J. Sasikumar
- Written by: Somanathan
- Screenplay by: Somanathan
- Produced by: R. Somanathan
- Starring: Prem Nazir; Vidhubala; Adoor Bhasi; Prema
- Cinematography: J. G. Vijayam
- Edited by: K. Sankunni
- Music by: M. K. Arjunan
- Production company: Soorya Pictures
- Distributed by: Soorya Pictures
- Release date: 7 February 1975
- Country: India
- Language: Malayalam

Pravaham is a 1975 Indian Malayalam-language film, directed by J. Sasikumar and produced by R. Somanathan. The film stars Prem Nazir, Vidhubala, Adoor Bhasi and Prema. The film's score was composed by M. K. Arjunan. The film was a remake of Tamil film Thayilla Pillai.

== Cast ==
- Prem Nazir
- Vidhubala
- Adoor Bhasi
- Prema
- Sankaradi
- Sreelatha Namboothiri
- T. S. Muthaiah
- Reena
- Vincent

== Soundtrack ==
The music was composed by M. K. Arjunan.

No.	Song	Singers	Lyrics	Length (m:ss)
1	"Chandanam Valarum"	K. J. Yesudas	Sreekumaran Thampi	
2	"Eppozhumenikkorumayakkam"	L. R. Eeswari	Sreekumaran Thampi	
3	"Life Is Wonderful"	Jayachandran	Sreekumaran Thampi	
4	"Maavinte Kombilirunnoru"	K. J. Yesudas, Vani Jayaram	Sreekumaran Thampi	
5	"Snehagaayike"	K. J. Yesudas	Sreekumaran Thampi	
6	"Snehathin Ponvilakke"	K. J. Yesudas	Sreekumaran Thampi	
