= Vachina Kodalu Nachindi =

- Theatrical release poster
- Directed by: D. Yoganand
- Screenplay by: D. Yoganand
- Story by: Acharya Aatreya
- Produced by: Ponnaluri Vasanth Kumar Reddy
- Starring: N. T. Rama Rao; Jamuna
- Cinematography: K. S. Prasad
- Edited by: G. D. Joshi; Hari
- Music by: Susarla Dakshinamurthi
- Production company: Sudhakar Films
- Release date: 21 October 1959
- Running time: 140 minutes
- Country: India
- Language: Telugu

Vachina Kodalu Nachindi (transl. I liked the daughter-in-law who came) is a 1959 Indian Telugu-language drama film, produced by Ponnaluri Vasanth Kumar Reddy under the Sudhakar Films banner and directed by D. Yoganand. It stars N. T. Rama Rao, and Jamuna and features music composed by Susarla Dakshinamurthi.

== Cast ==
- N. T. Rama Rao as Ravi
- Jamuna as Chandra
- Rajanala as Raju
- Relangi as Venkata Sawmy
- C.S.R. as Jogulu
- Kannamba as Jayamma
- Suryakantham as Ratnam

== Soundtrack ==
Vachina Kodalu Nachindi

Film score by Susarla Dakshinamurthi
- Released: 1959
- Genre: Soundtrack
- Length: 30:29
- Producer: Susarla Dakshinamurthi

Music composed by Susarla Dakshinamurthi. Music released on Audio Company.

S. No.	Song title	Lyrics	Singers	length
1	"Em Kavali Manishiki"	Aatreya	Jikki	01:29
2	"Pahimam.... Jaya Jaya Janani"	Aatreya	M. L. Vasanthakumari	03:44
3	"Andham Chindhe Aatagatthenera"	Atreya	Jikki	03:45
4	"Ayyalu Ammalu.... Suno Chinnababu"	Gurram Jashuva	J. V. Raghavulu, S. Janaki & P. S. Vaidehi	03:42
5	"Prema Tamasha Vintene Kulasa"	Atreya	Ghantasala & Jikki	03:46
6	"Telisindanna Telisindhi"	Atreya	P. S. Vaidehi	02:40
7	"Valapulu Chilike Kaluvaladoraki"	Atreya	Jikki	02:52
8	"Emo Emanukoneno Na Matha"	Atreya	R. Balasaraswathi Devi	03:19
9	"Saranantimamma Karuninchavamma"	Atreya	M. L. Vasanthakumari, Ghantasala & Jikki	04:09
10	"Pahimam Mamuganna.... Manasaina Tallivani"	Atreya	M. L. Vasanthakumari	01:22
