= Veturi Prabhakara Sastri =

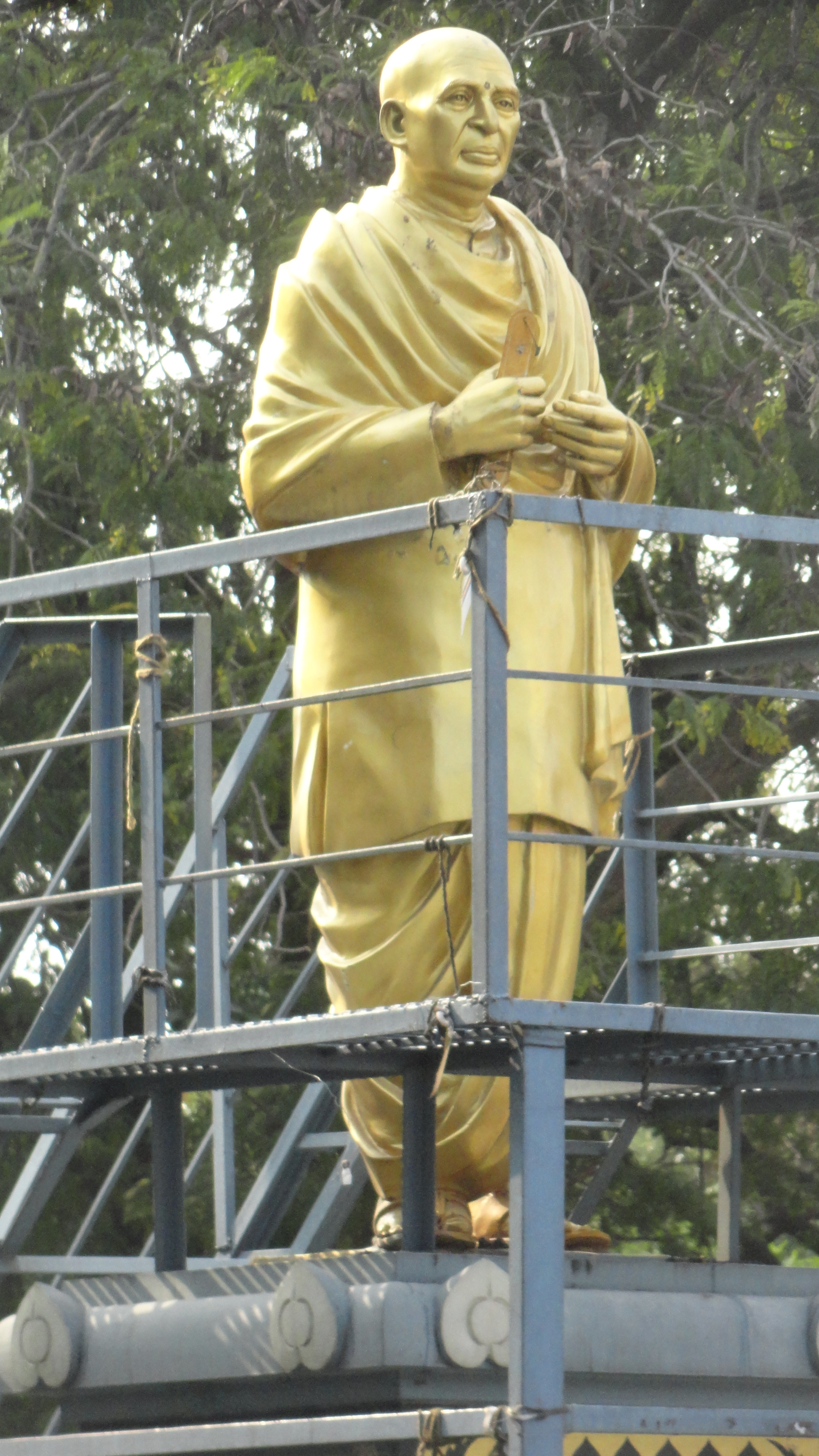
- Born: 7 February 1888; Pedakallepalli, Krishna District, Andhra Pradesh, India
- Died: 29 August 1950 (aged 62)
- Occupations: Telugu scholar and editor
- Relatives: Veturi (nephew)

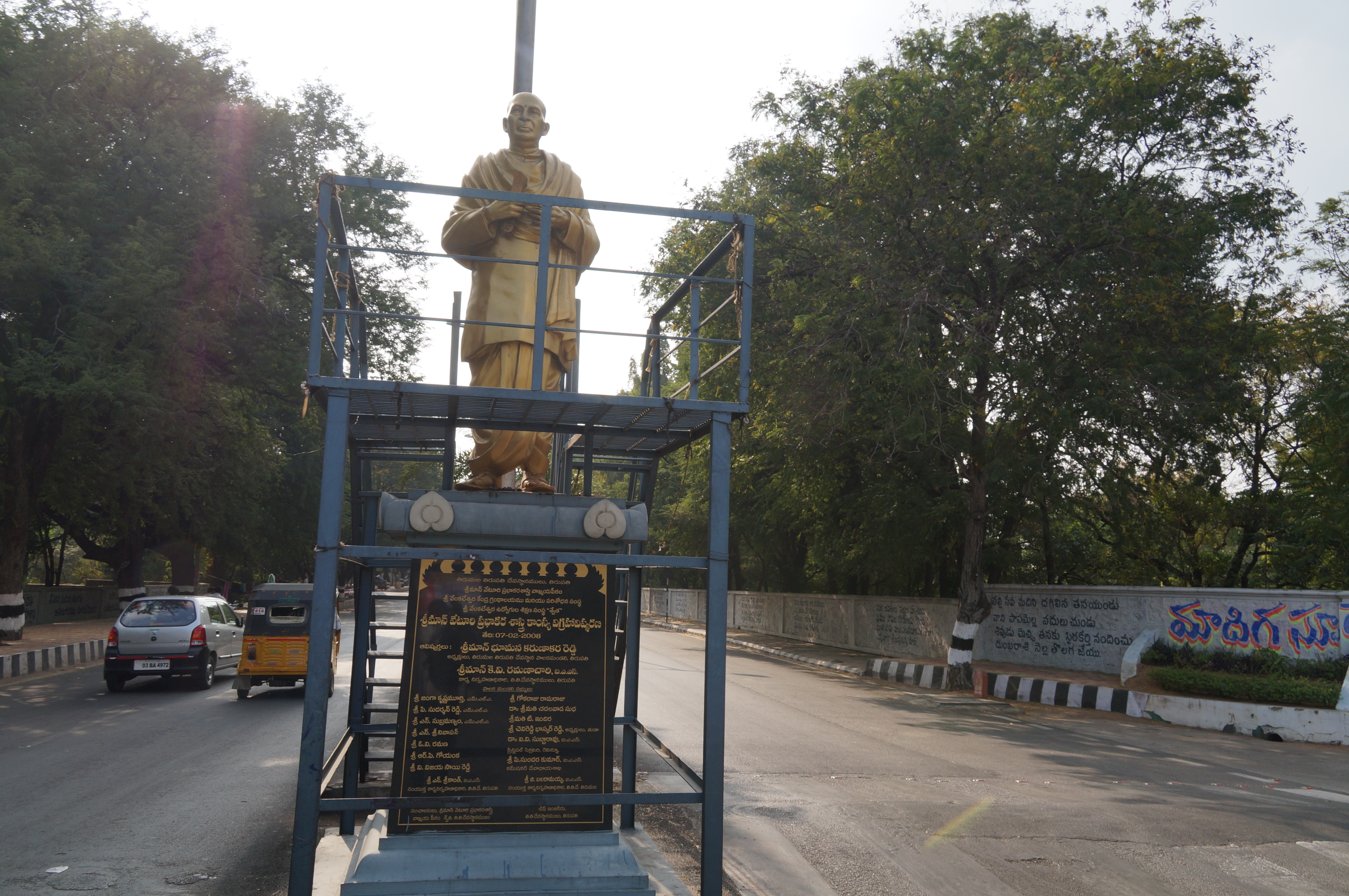
Veturi Prabhakara Sastri statue in Tirupati.

Veturi Prabhakara Sastri (7 February 1888 – 29 August 1950) was a Sanskrit and Telugu scholar, editor, translator and historian. He was born in the town of Pedakallepalli in the Krishna District of Andhra Pradesh. He was known for deciphering a few thousand of Annamayya's composition during his tenure at the Devasthanam Oriental Institute. He is also recognized for his scholarship on Telugu poet Srinatha's work. Veturi was involved in researching lost texts and forgotten literature, and he is regarded for his enlightened and liberal scholarship that was free of literary or religious prejudices.

== Work ==
As a publisher and writer, he introduced to the Telugu people several antiquated texts, in association with Manavalli Ramakrishna Kavi from prachya likhita pustaka bhandagaram (library of ancient scripts). He discovered the copper scripts of Annamayya's poetry and introduced them to Telugu people. Similarly, he unearthed palm scripts of Ranganatha's Ragadalu. He published Tanjavuri Andhra Rajula Charitra, Srinatha Vaibhavamu, Sringara Srinatham, Manu Charitra, Basava Puranam etc. with elaborate introductions. He translated Bhasa's Pratima Natakam, Karnaabharam and Madhyama Vyayogam.

Veturi Prabhakara Sastry was also an editor of Ayurvedic texts. He edited and wrote an introduction for an Ayurvedic text called the Carucarya for a patron, the then-Raja of Muktyala. He also edited the 'Ballad of the Battle of Yerragaddapadu' written by Gangula Pinayellaya. Veturi also edited many Hindu religious satakams and stavams in praise of Venkateshwara, such as Venkatachala Vihara Satakam. Veturi Prabhakara Sastry was also a translator. He rendered the classical Sanskrit farcical play 'Bhagavadajjukam' of Bodhyanakavi into Telugu, and he translated a Sanskrit farcical play 'Mattavilasaprahasanam' into a Telugu work entitled 'Mattavilasamu.'

== Vangmaya Peetham ==
Tirumala Tirupati Devasthanams (TTD) established "Sriman Veturi Prabhakara Sastri Vangmaya Peetham" in 2007 to publish his books and research works. A life-size bronze statue of Sri Veturi was installed before the SVETA Complex in Tirupati.
