= Susarla Dakshinamurthi =

Indian musician

Background information
- Born: Susarla Dakshinamurthi Sastry Jr. 11 November 1921; Pedakallepalli, Krishna District, Andhra Pradesh, India
- Died: 9 February 2012 (aged 90) Chennai, Tamil Nadu, India
- Occupations: Music director; playback singer; record producer; arranger; conductor
- Years active: 1946–1984
- Musical career
- Genres: Film scores; classical
- Instruments: Vocals; Violin; Harmonium
- Labels: His Master's Voice; Columbia Records
- Formerly of: Modern Theaters; All India Radio

Susarla Dakshinamurthi Jr. (Telugu: సుసర్ల దక్షిణామూర్తి; 11 November 1921 – 9 February 2012) was an Indian music composer, playback singer, record producer, Carnatic musician, multi-instrumentalist, and an eminent violinist known for his works in the South Indian film industry, Hindi cinema, Sri Lankan cinema, and Hollywood.

Dakshinamurthi was the grandson of Susarla Dakshinamurthi Sr. who belonged to the student clan of saint Tyagaraja. He is known for his compositions in works such as Narada Naradi (1946) (music director), Laila Majnu (1949) (playback singer), Paramanandayya Sishyula Katha (1950) (playback singer and music director), Samsaram (1950) (music director), Sri Lakshmamma Katha (1950) (playback singer and music director), Sarvadhikari (1951) (playback singer and music director), Yaar Paiyyan (1957) (music director), Santhanam (1955) (playback singer and music director), Jungle Moon Men (1955), (re-recordist and conductor), Ilavelpu (1956) (playback singer and music director), Veera Kankanam (1957) (music director), Annapurna (1959) (music director), Krishna Leelalu (1959) (music director), Narthanasala (1963), which won the National Film Award for Second Best Feature Film, Sri Madvirata Parvam (1979), Srimadvirat Veerabrahmendra Swami Charitra (1984).

== Biography ==
=== Early life ===
He was born on 11 November 1921 in Pedakallepalli, Krishna District of present-day Andhra Pradesh, India to Krishnabrahma Sastry, who was a musician and teacher and Smt. Annapurnamma. He graduated with an arts degree in classical music, and became a proportional violinist at the age of nine. He subsequently worked as a harmonium player for the label His Master's Voice in 1938. He then worked for All India Radio as A-grade artist in the late 1930s, and became the Director for South Indian region.

=== Film career ===
He then moved to cinema and conducted music alongside C. R. Subburaman. He made Lata Mangeshkar sing the ever popular song Nidurapora Thammuda, in his movie Santhanam (1955). Samsaram (1950) movie was a musical hit film with ever popular song Samsaram Samsaram by Ghantasala and A. M. Rajah in Telugu and Tamil languages respectively. He then ventured into Hollywood, and became a re-recordist, and conductor for works such as Jungle Moon Men (1955), and several others by Columbia Pictures.

Dakshinamurthy produced hits tracks such as Challani Raja O Chandamama written by Raghunath Panigrahi. He sang Challani Punnami Vennelalone casting Relangi in the film. His music for Nartanasala (1963) particularly the songs Evari Kosam Ee Mandhahasam, Naravara Kuruvara (S. Janaki), Janani Siva Kaamini (P. Susheela), Salalitha Raga Sudharasa Saaram (M. Balamuralikrishna) and Sakhiya Vivarinchave are forever memorable. Later he worked on musical hits such as Sri Madvirata Parvam (1979) and Srimadvirat Veerabrahmendra Swami Charitra (1984). He then ventured into film production and produced Mohini Rukmangada (1960) and Rama Sundari (1962) under Anuradha Movies.

=== Later life and death ===
Murthi developed Diabetic retinopathy and lost vision in one eye in 1972 and in the other in 1987. Murthi died at his residence in Chennai on 9 Feb 2012. He expressed difficulty in breathing when an ambulance was called in. That was only 5 minutes before his death when he said that he did not want to be taken to the hospital. Just as he had wanted he died at 9.30 PM when the ambulance reached at 9.35 PM.

== Selected filmography ==
=== Music director ===
| Year | Film | Language | Director | Banner | Co-Music Directors |
|---|---|---|---|---|---|
| 1946 | Narada Naradi | Telugu | C. Pullayya | Jagan Mani | |
| 1947 | Setu Bandhanam | Telugu | Madhukar | Jyoti Pictures | |
| 1950 | Paramanandayya Sishyulu | Telugu | Kasturi Siva Rao | Allied Productions | Ogirala Ramachandra Rao |
| 1950 | Samsaram | Telugu | L. V. Prasad | Sadhana Productions | |
| 1950 | Sri Lakshmamma Katha | Telugu | Ghantasala Balaramaiah | Pratibha Productions | C. R. Subburaman |
| 1950 | Lakshmamma | Tamil | Ghantasala Balaramaiah | Pratibha Productions | C. R. Subburaman |
| 1951 | Aada Janma | Telugu | G. R. Rao | Modern Theaters | G. Ramanathan |
| 1951 | Sarvadhikari | Tamil | T. R. Sundaram | Modern Theatres | |
| 1951 | Sarvadhikari | Telugu | T. R. Sundaram | Modern Theatres | |
| 1952 | Daasi | Telugu | C. V. Ranganatha Das | Rajyam Pictures | C. R. Subburaman |
| 1952 | Valaiyapathi | Tamil | T. R. Sundaram & Acharya M. Mastan | Modern Theatres | |
| 1952 | Savathi Poru | Telugu | T. R. Sundaram & Acharya M. Mastan | Modern Theatres | |
| 1952 | Kalyani | Tamil | Acharya M. Mastan | Modern Theatres | G. Ramanathan |
| 1952 | Atthainti Kaapuram | Telugu | Acharya M. Mastan | Modern Theatres | G. Ramanathan |
| 1953 | Sujatha | Sinhala | T. R. Sundaram | Modern Theatres | |
| 1953 | Velaikari Magal | Tamil | C. V. Ranganatha Das | Rajyam Pictures | C. R. Subburaman |
| 1954 | Varada Kageda? | Sinhala | T. R. Sundaram | Modern Theatres | |
| 1954 | Radala Piliruwa | Sinhala | T. R. Sundaram | Modern Theatres | |
| 1955 | Santanam | Kannada | C. V. Ranganatha Das | Sadhana Films | |
| 1955 | Santanam | Tamil | C. V. Ranganatha Das | Sadhana Films | |
| 1955 | Santanam | Telugu | C. V. Ranganatha Das | Sadhana Films | |
| 1955 | Seda Sulang | Sinhala | T. Somesekeran | Ceylon Films Ltd. | Ananda Samarakoon |
| 1955 | Mangaiyar Thilakam | Tamil | L. V. Prasad | Vaidhya Films | |
| 1956 | Duppathage Duka | Sinhala | T. R. Sundaram | Modern Theatres | |
| 1956 | Ilavelpu | Telugu | D. Yoganand | Lakshmi Productions | |
| 1956 | Alibabavum 40 Thirudargalum | Tamil | T. R. Sundaram | Modern Theatres | |
| 1956 | Alibaba 40 Dongalu | Tamil | T. R. Sundaram | Modern Theatres | |
| 1956 | Harishchandra | Telugu | Jampana | Rajyam Pictures | |
| 1957 | Baagyavathi | Tamil | L. V. Prasad | Ravi Productions | |
| 1957 | Bhale Baava | Telugu | Rajanikanth | Sridhanasai Films | |
| 1957 | Rani Rangamma | Telugu | T. R. Raghunath | Modern Theatres | G. Ramanathan |
| 1957 | Sankalpam | Telugu | C. V. Ranganatha Das | Saradha | |
| 1957 | Saradam | Sinhala | T. Somasekaran | | |
| 1957 | Veera Kankanam | Telugu | G. R. Rao | Modern Theatres | |
| 1957 | Yaar Paiyan | Tamil | T. R. Raghunath | Vijaya Films | |
| 1957 | Suraya | Sinhala | T. R. Sundaram | Modern Theatres | |
| 1958 | Athisaya Thirudan | Tamil | P. Pullaiah | Sahini Art Productions | K. Prasad Rao |
| 1958 | Vana Mohini | Sinhala | T. R. Sundaram | Modern Theatres | |
| 1959 | Banda Ramudu | Telugu | P. Pullaiah | Sahini Art Productions | K. Prasad Rao |
| 1959 | Krishna Leelalu | Telugu | Jampana | Rajyam Pictures | |
| 1959 | Ulagam Sirikkirathu | Tamil | K. Ramamurthy | Prabhu Films | |
| 1959 | Vachina Kodalu Nachindi | Telugu | D. Yoganand | Sudhakar Films | |
| 1960 | Aasha Sundari | Kannada | Hunsur Krishnamurthy | Gowri Productions | |
| 1960 | Annapurna | Telugu | V. Madhusudan Rao | Jagapathi Art Pictures | |
| 1960 | Irumanam Kalanthal Thirumanam | Tamil | Jampanna & G. Viswanath | V. S. P. Pictures | |
| 1960 | Ramasundari | Telugu | Hunsur Krishnamurthy | Maheshwari Productions | |
| 1961 | Pangaaligal | Tamil | G. Ramakrishnan | Iris Movies | |
| 1963 | Narthanasala | Telugu | Kamalakara Kameswara Rao | Rajyam Pictures | |
| 1972 | Bava Diddina Kapuram | Telugu | G. Ramakrishnan | Iris Movies | Pendyala Srinivas |
| 1975 | Amma | Telugu | M. S. N. Murthy | | Pamarthi |
| 1977 | Brathuku Baatalu | Telugu | Matrusree Publications Trust | Sri Lakshmi Chitralaya Combines | |
| 1979 | Sri Madvirata Parvam | Telugu | N. T. Rama Rao | Ramakrishna Cine Studio | |
| 1984 | Satya Harischandra | Telugu | C. S. Rao | | |
| 1984 | Srimadvirat Veerabrahmendra Swami Charitra | Telugu | N. T. Rama Rao | Ramakrishna Cine Studios | |
| 1989 | Bala Nagamma | Telugu | C. S. Rao | | |

=== Playback singer ===
| Year | Film | Language | Song | Co-singer | Music |
|---|---|---|---|---|---|
| 1947 | Palnati Yuddham | Telugu | Oho Bharata Yuvati | | Galipenchala Narasimha Rao |
| 1949 | Laila Majnu | Tamil | Maghimaiyodu Sadhaa Ezhai | Ghantasala & Madhavapeddi Satyam | C. R. Subburaman |
| 1949 | Laila Majnu | Telugu | Manasu Gadaa Khudaa | Ghantasala & Madhavapeddi Satyam | C. R. Subburaman |
| 1950 | Paramanandayya Sishyulu | Telugu | Edira Lakshmana | Relangi & K. Rani | Ogirala Ramachandra Rao & S. Dakshinamurthi |
| 1950 | Paramanandayya Sishyulu | Telugu | E Leela Cheliyanu | | Ogirala Ramachandra Rao & S. Dakshinamurthi |
| 1950 | Paramanandayya Sishyulu | Telugu | Polika Raada | K. Rani | Ogirala Ramachandra Rao & S. Dakshinamurthi |
| 1950 | Sri Lakshmamma Katha | Telugu | Hayiga Veenula Vinduga | P. Leela | C. R. Subburaman |
| 1950 | Sri Lakshmamma Katha | Telugu | Ayyayyo Annemu Punnemerugani Abala | | C. R. Subburaman |
| 1950 | Sri Lakshmamma Katha | Telugu | Puvvula Vaanaa Le Navvulasonaa | | C. R. Subburaman |
| 1950 | Samsaram | Telugu | Chitramainadi Vidhi | | S. Dakshinamurthi |
| 1950 | Samsaram | Telugu | Naa Maata Vinave | T. Satyavathi | S. Dakshinamurthi |
| 1950 | Samsaram | Telugu | Nagubatukada | | S. Dakshinamurthi |
| 1951 | Aada Janma | Telugu | | | G. Ramanathan & S. Dakshinamurthi |
| 1951 | Sarvadhikari | Tamil | Jaakradhaiyaa Jaakradhaiyaa | U. R. Chandra | S. Dakshinamurthi |
| 1951 | Sarvadhikari | Tamil | Sandai Theerndhu Pochu | | S. Dakshinamurthi |
| 1951 | Sarvadhikari | Tamil | Thadavi Paartthu Nallaa Irunthaa | P. A. Periyanayaki | S. Dakshinamurthi |
| 1951 | Sarvadhikari | Telugu | Jagrattoyi Jagratha Jagrattoyi Nee | P. Leela | S. Dakshinamurthi |
| 1951 | Sarvadhikari | Telugu | Naanyamaina Attar Baabu | P. Leela | S. Dakshinamurthi |
| 1951 | Sarvadhikari | Telugu | Sundarudaa Naa Chetula Punyamademo | P. Leela | S. Dakshinamurthi |
| 1951 | Sarvadhikari | Telugu | Saruku Choosi Baguntene Dabbuliyyandee | P. Leela | S. Dakshinamurthi |
| 1951 | Stree Sahasam | Telugu | Andaala Raja | Jikki | C. R. Subburaman |
| 1951 | Stree Sahasam | Telugu | Vidhiye Pagaye | Jikki | C. R. Subburaman |
| 1952 | Athinti Kapuram | Telugu | Kalamura Kalikalamura | | G. Ramanathan & S. Dakshinamurthi |
| 1952 | Athinti Kapuram | Telugu | Dhaname Kadaa Dhaname Kadaa | | G. Ramanathan & S. Dakshinamurthi |
| 1952 | Athinti Kapuram | Telugu | Mana Hrudaya Veena | K. Rani | G. Ramanathan & S. Dakshinamurthi |
| 1952 | Kalyani | Tamil | Kaadhal Aiyaiyo Kaadhal | | G. Ramanathan & S. Dakshinamurthi |
| 1952 | Daasi | Telugu | | | C. R. Subburaman & S. Dakshinamurthi |
| 1953 | Velaikari Magal | Telugu | Ambalatharase Arumarunthe | | C. R. Subburaman & S. Dakshinamurthi |
| 1955 | Santhanam | Telugu | Idhi Vintha Jeevithame | T. Sathyavathi | S. Dakshinamurthi |
| 1956 | Harischandra | Telugu | Ayodhya Rajyamura Manadi | Madhavapeddi Satyam, Pithapuram Nageswara Rao & Jikki | S. Dakshinamurthi |
| 1956 | Harischandra | Telugu | Ayyo Idhe Nyaayamo | | S. Dakshinamurthi |
| 1956 | Ilavelpu | Telugu | Challani Punnami Vennelalone | P. Susheela | S. Dakshinamurthi |
| 1957 | Bhale Baava | Telugu | Kadupaa Chooste Jaanedu Sarigaa | | S. Dakshinamurthi |
| 1957 | Sankalpam | Telugu | Kanugeeti Piliche | P. Leela | S. Dakshinamurthi |
| 1957 | Sankalpam | Telugu | Vennala Chalikanthulalo | | S. Dakshinamurthi |
| 1957 | Sankalpam | Telugu | Thappudu Panulu | Pithapuram Nageswara Rao | S. Dakshinamurthi |
