= Pedakallepalli =

- Village
- Interactive map of Pedakallepalli
- Location in Andhra Pradesh, India Pedakallepalli (India)
- Coordinates: 16°4′57″N 80°59′23″E
- Country: India
- State: Andhra Pradesh
- District: Krishna

Area
  - Total: 22.57 km^{2} (8.71 sq mi)

Population (2011)
  - Total: 6,547
  - Density: 290.1/km^{2} (751.3/sq mi)

Languages
  - Official: Telugu
- Time zone: UTC+5:30 (IST)
- PIN: 521130
- Vehicle registration: AP
- Nearest city: Vijayawada
- Lok Sabha constituency: Machilipatnam
- Vidhan Sabha constituency: Avanigadda

Pedakallēpalli is a village in Krishna district of the Indian state of Andhra Pradesh. It is located in Mopidevi mandal of Machilipatnam revenue division. It is one of the villages in the mandal to be a part of Andhra Pradesh Capital Region. Susarla Dakshinamurthy, a notable music stalwart is from this place, also, well-known poet/lyricist/songwriter Veturi is from this place.

This place is also known as Dakshina Kasi.

== See also ==
- Villages in Mopidevi mandal
