= A. Maruthakasi =

Indian poet

- Born: Ayyamperumal Maruthakasi Udayar; 13 February 1920; Melakudikadu, Madras Presidency, British India
- Died: 29 November 1989 (aged 69)
- Occupations: Poet, lyricist
- Spouse: Dhanakoti Ammal
- Children: 9

A. Maruthakasi (13 February 1920 – 29 November 1989) was an Indian poet and film lyricist who wrote mainly in the Tamil language. He penned more than 4000 lyrics in more than 250 Tamil films.

== Early life ==
Born in Melakudikadu in Tiruchirappalli district on 13 February 1920 to Ayyamperumal Udayar and Milagayi Ammal, he had his primary education in the local village school. He received his higher education at Government College, Kumbakonam.

After college, he wrote lyrics for the dramas staged by Devi Nadaga Sabha and for Mandirikumari, a drama written by M. Karunanidhi. He also wrote lyrics for the drama company owned by Ka. Mu. Sheriff. The songs for the dramas were composed by Thiruchi Loganathan. Later, he joined as an assistant Rajagopala Iyer, brother of Papanasam Sivan.

== Career ==
In 1949, Modern Theatres was producing a Tamil film. G. Ramanathan was the composer. During the song recording rehearsals, Thiruchi Loganathan sang a song penned by Maruthakasi. Producer T. R. Sundaram appreciated the meaning of the lyrics and gave a chance to Maruthakasi in the film. Pen Enum Maayap Peyaam... Poi Maadharai Yen Manam Naadumo is the first film lyric penned by Maruthakasi and the film Mayavathi released in 1949.

Since then he has written more than 4000 lyrics for more than 250 Tamil films. He had the ability to write lyrics to an already set tune. As such, he has penned lyrics for many films dubbed from other language films.

When Modern Theatres decided to produce Alibabavum 40 Thirudargalum in 1956, T. R. Sundaram decided to use the same tunes set for the Hindi film of the same name. Udumalai Narayana Kavi was called to write the lyrics. But he declined saying that he will write lyrics for fresh tunes and recommended Maruthakasi. Maruthakasi wrote 9 songs for the set tunes.

One of his greatest hits, Neelavanna Kanna Vaadaa from the film (Mangaiyar Thilakam was first assigned to Kannadasan. But film-maker L. V. Prasad was not impressed by that song. He asked Maruthakasi to write the song and it became a big hit.

During the earlier decades of Tamil films, songs were written as per old Tamil literature. Maruthakasi is a foremost lyricist who started writing lyrics that could be understood by the common man.

Many of his lyrics have taken root in the hearts of audience.

- Neelavanna Kanna Vaadaa (Mangaiyar Thilakam – 1955)
- Sathiyame Latchiyamaayi Kollada (Neelamalai Thirudan – 1957)
- Mullai Malar Mele (Uthama Puthiran – 1958)
- Yer Munaikku Ner Inge Edhuvumeyille (Pillai Kani Amudhu – 1958)
- Sirippu Idhan Sirappai (Raja Rani – 1956)

are some of his songs that still remain evergreen among Tamil film music lovers.

== Personal life ==
He married Dhanakodi Ammal in 1940. The couple had 6 sons and 3 daughters.

He encouraged young persons who were looking for a career in Tamil films.

- When Vaali was looking for opportunities in the early sixties, he was given a chance to write a song for the film Nallavan Vazhvan. The recording of the song Sirikindral inru sirikindral was being postponed several times for various reasons. The producers thought the 'omen' was not good and asked Maruthakasi to write a song. Maruthakasi read Vaali's lyrics and told the producer that it is an excellent song and told the producer to record Vaali's song. The song was a hit.
- When Modern Theatres in Salem produced Paasavalai in 1956, they invited Maruthakasi to write the lyrics. But Maruthakasi was busy in Chennai. He recommended Pattukkottai Kalyanasundaram for writing the lyrics.
- In 1954 he recommended T. M. Soundararajan as a playback singer for the film Thookku Thookki to music director G. Ramanathan. T. M. Soundararajan went on to become a legend in Tamil film music.

After 1960s most of the producers sought Kannadasan as lyricist for their films. Maruthakasi did not get much opportunities. He tried to produce films but sustained losses so he returned to his village. M. G. Ramachandran called him back to Chennai and made him to write lyrics for all films produced by Devar Films. Maruthakasi wrote lyrics for films produced by K. S. Gopalakrishnan.

== Works ==
His works have been made public by the State government of Tamil Nadu.

As a Lyricist

The following list is incomplete.

| Year | Film | Songs | Music |
|---|---|---|---|
| 1955 | Mangaiyar Thilakam | Baakkiyavathi Naan Baakkiyavathi Nee Varavillaiyenil Aadharavedhu Neela Vanna Kanna Vaada Purindhu Kollavillai Innum Unmai Anbu Endrum Anaindhidaadha Theebam | Susarla Dakshinamurthi |
| 1956 | Alibabavum 40 Thirudargalum | All songs | Susarla Dakshinamurthi |
| 1956 | Raja Rani | Sirippu Idhan Sirappai Sollaale Veenaanadhe Thirai Pottu Naame | T. R. Pappa |
| 1957 | Makkalai Petra Magarasi | Manapaarai Maadu Katti Sonna Pechcha Kekkanum Vandhadhu Yaarunu Makkalai Petra Maharasi Seemaikku Poi Padichchavaru Senthazham Poovai Poi Ondru Serndha Anbu | K. V. Mahadevan |
| 1957 | Neelamalai Thirudan | Konjum Mozhi Penngalukku Sathiyame Latchiyamai Ullam Kollai Kannalam" (Onnukku Rendatchi) | K. V. Mahadevan |
| 1957 | Bagyavathi | "Pombalainga Therinju Kollanum" "Ellorum Unnai Nallavan Endre" "Dhinasari En Vaazhvil Thirunaale" "Vaazhvedhu Nal Vaazhvedhu" "Kannale Vettadhe Summaa Kannale Vettadhe" "Paruvam Malarndhu Asaindhu Aadum" "Asai Kiliye Azhagu Chilaiye" | S. Dakshinamurthi |
| 1958 | Thai Pirandhal Vazhi Pirakkum | Thai Pirantha Vazhi Pirakkum Sollattuma Sollattuma Nerangketta Nerathile...Nenachathu Onnu Pollaathor Soozhchi | K. V. Mahadevan |
| 1958 | Uthama Puthiran | Muthe Pavalame Mullai Malar Mele Anbe Amudhey | G. Ramanathan |
| 1958 | Petra Maganai Vitra Annai | Thendral Urangiya Podhum Kannaalan Vandhiduvaar Petra Maganai Vitra Annai Mamma Mamma Pannaadai | Viswanathan–Ramamoorthy |
| 1958 | Pillai Kaniyamudhu | All songs (except "Seevi Mudichukiddu Singaaram" and "Kaakkaaikkum Kaakkaaikum") | K. V. Mahadevan |
| 1958 | Sarangadhara | All songs (except Yaedhukkithanai Modi Than) | G. Ramanathan |
| 1959 | Vannakili | All songs | K. V. Mahadevan |
| 1959 | Vaazha Vaitha Deivam | | K. V. Mahadevan |
| 1960 | Padikkadha Medhai | Aadi Pizhaithaalum Paadi Pizhaithaalum Inba Malargal Poothu Seevi Mudichu Singarichu Pakkathile Kanni Penn Vindhaiyinum Periya Vindhaiyadi | K. V. Mahadevan |
| 1960 | Mannathi Mannan | Aadadha Manamum Undo Aadum Mayile Azhagu Mayile Engalin Rani | Viswanathan–Ramamoorthy |
| 1960 | Paavai Vilakku | All songs | K. V. Mahadevan |
| 1961 | Sabaash Mapillai | All songs | K. V. Mahadevan |
| 1963 | Lava Kusa | All songs | K. V. Mahadevan |
| 1967 | Vivasaayee | Ennama Singara Kadavul Ennum Vivasayee | K. V. Mahadevan |
| 1975 | Ninaithadhai Mudippavan | Kannai Nambathey Poomazhai Thoovi Vasantham (Short version) | M. S. Viswanathan |
| 1977 | Palabishegham | All songs | Shankar–Ganesh |

== Death ==
He died on 29 November 1989.
