= Vempati Sadasivabrahmam =

Indian writer

- Born: 1905; Tuni, Kakinada district, Madras Presidency, British India
- Died: 1 January 1968 (aged 62–63); Madras, Madras state, India
- Occupation: Screenwriter

Vempati Sadasivabrahmam (1905 – 1 January 1968) was an Indian screenwriter and lyricist known for his contributions to Telugu cinema. He was a prolific writer of scripts, dialogues, and lyrics in the early years of the industry. Born in Tuni, Kakinada district, Andhra Pradesh, Sadasivabrahmam was well-versed in both Sanskrit and Telugu, having studied the Pancha Kavyas. He made his debut in cinema with the 1941 film Choodamani, for which he wrote the story, dialogues, and lyrics. He died in Madras in 1968.

== Filmography ==
1. Choodamani (1941) (dialogue) (story)
2. Tenali Ramakrishna (1941) (story)
3. Gharana Donga (1942) (writer)
4. Palnati Yudham (1947) (dialogue)
5. Radhika (1947) (director)
6. Gollabhama (1947) (dialogues) (Lyrics)
7. Keelugurram (1949)
8. Samsaram (1950) (dialogue) (story)
9. Pakka Inti Ammayi (1953)
10. Pardesi (1953) (dialogue)
11. Kanavane Kan Kanda Daivam (1955) (story)
12. Kanyasulkam (1955) (screen adaptation)
13. Tenali Ramakrishna (1956/I) (dialogue) (story)
14. Bhale Ramudu (1956) (dialogue)
15. Charana Daasi (1956) (screen adaptation and dialogue)
16. Ondre Kulam (1956) (Story)
17. Dampatyam (1957)
18. Suvarna Sundari (1957/I) (story)
19. Sharada (1957) (story)
20. Iru Sagodharigal (1957) story
21. Appu Chesi Pappu Koodu (1958) (adaptation) (dialogue)
22. Chenchu Lakshmi (1958/I) (adaptation) (dialogue)
23. Illarikam (1959) (dialogue) (story)
24. Krishna Leelalu (1959) (adaptation) (dialogue)
25. Nagarjuna (1961)
26. Pellikani Pillalu (1961)
27. Sasural (1961) (story)
28. Lava Kusha (1963) (lyrics)
29. Prachanda Bhairavi (1965)
30. Paramanandayya Shishyula Katha (1966)
31. Bhama Vijayam (1967)
32. Bhuvana Sundari Katha (1967)
33. Nene Monaganni (1968)
34. Ranabheri (1968)
