= L. V. Prasad =

Indian director and producer

Akkineni Laxmi Vara Prasada Rao
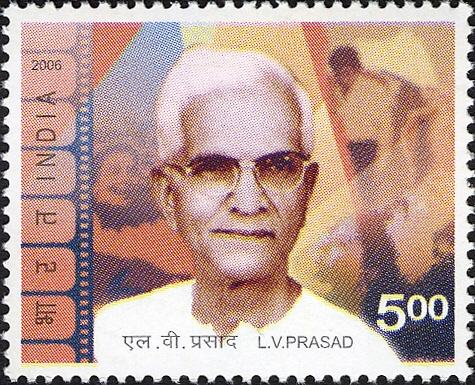
- Prasad on a 2006 stamp of India
- Born: 17 January 1907; Somavarappadu, Madras Presidency, British India (now Andhra Pradesh, India)
- Died: 22 June 1994 (aged 87); Hyderabad, Andhra Pradesh (now Telangana), India
- Occupations: Actor; director; producer; businessman
- Years active: 1930–1990
- Children: 2, Late A. Anand Rao and Ramesh Prasad
- Relatives: A. Sreekar Prasad (nephew)
- Awards: Raghupathi Venkaiah Award (1980); Dadasaheb Phalke Award (1982)

Akkineni Laxmi Vara Prasada Rao (17 January 1907 – 22 June 1994), known professionally as L. V. Prasad, was an Indian film director, producer, actor, and businessman. He was one of the pioneers of Telugu Cinema and is the recipient of the Dadasaheb Phalke Award, the highest Award for films in India. In 1980, he was awarded the Raghupathi Venkaiah Award, for his contribution to Telugu cinema.

He founded Prasads Group in 1956, which include the Prasad Art Pictures, Prasad Studios, Prasad's IMAX and L. V. Prasad Eye Institute. He was elected as the President of The South Indian Film Chamber of Commerce for the year 1982–83. The Government of India released a Commemorative postage stamp in his memory in 2006.

Prasad also had the unique distinction of acting in the first talkies of three different languages of Indian cinema; Alam Ara (Hindi), Bhakta Prahlada (Telugu) and Kalidas (a Tamil and Telugu bilingual film).

== Early life ==
Akkineni Lakshmi Vara Prasada Rao was born on 17 January 1907 in a Telugu family in the remote village of Somavarappadu, in Eluru Taluk in West Godavari district, Andhra Pradesh. The second son to Akkineni Sriramulu and Akkineni Basavamma, the family was into agriculture and Prasad was a pampered child, very intelligent, but never interested in studies.

At the age of 17 in 1924, he married his maternal uncle's daughter, Soundarya Manoharamma and had a daughter. Prasad's father had mounting debts and declared insolvency, at which point Prasad looked to a cinema career.

== Career ==
L. V. Prasad worked as an errand boy for Venus Film Company. He then joined India Pictures as an errand boy, where Akthar Nawaz cast him in a bit-part in the silent film Star of the East. In 1931, he acted in India's first "talkie", Alam Ara, recruited through Venus Film Company. Other minor roles followed. These films were made by Imperial Films, through which he met H. M. Reddy. Reddy gave Prasad a small role in Kalidas, the first Tamil and Telugu bilingual "talkie", and subsequently in Bhakta Prahlada, the first Telugu "talkie". It was around this time that Prasad made contact with his family and then returned home to visit them. He then returned to Bombay with his wife and daughter, where his sons, Anand and Ramesh, were born.

Prasad by chance got a role as an assistant director in Kamar-Al–Zaman, directed by Ali Shah. This was also the time that his name was shortened from Akkineni Lakshmi Vara Prasad Rao to L. V. Prasad, this being a consequence of a clerk finding the name too long to use. The shortened name stuck with him thereafter. Tantra Subrahmanyam assigned him a job of a production supervisor and assistant director for the film Kashta Jeevi, which took him to Bombay again. The film was abandoned after shooting three reels. Prasad was in no mood to leave now and he got a job as assistant director in a few other films. During this time, using his connections with Prithviraj Kapoor, he joined Prithvi Theatres and satisfied his acting passion. It was during this time that he met Raj Kapoor, the hero of his first Hindi production Sharada.

In 1943, he got the opportunity to take on the responsibility of assistant director for Gruha Pravesam. Due to circumstances, he became the director of the film and then he was also chosen as the lead actor of the film. Gruha Pravesam, released in 1946 was one of the finest films of the forties and went on to become a classic of the period. After this, K. S. Prakasa Rao offered Prasad an important role in Drohi. During this time, Ramabrahmam was facing difficulty in finishing his film Palnati Yudham due to ill health and he chose Prasad to do justice to this film. After this in 1949, Prasad directed Mana Desam and introduced N. T. Rama Rao, later to become a legend in Telugu cinema, in a minor role.

In 1950, Vijaya Pictures released their first film Shavukaru, establishing L. V. Prasad as a director. Samsaram, released in the same year, brought together the two people who would become notable actors in the Telugu film industry as brothers – N. T. Rama Rao and Akkineni Nageswara Rao in a social drama which created records wherever it was released. The film provided a model for later filmmakers, a model and theme relevant and popular amongst film makers even today. After this, success chased him. He directed some memorable films in the fifties all of them known for their drama and fine humour. Rani a Hindi film took him to Bombay again and after that Jupiter Films engaged L. V. Prasad to direct their magnum opus Manohara (1954), starring the legendary Sivaji Ganesan in Tamil and dub it in Telugu and Hindi.

But L. V. Prasad had more goals to achieve. In 1955, he assigned D. Yoganand to direct his first production Ilavelpu in Telugu under the banner Lakshmi Productions. L. V. Prasad established Prasad Productions, soon after this in 1956. His second son Ramesh returned from the United States after obtaining his B.E.M.S degree and established Prasad Film Labs in Chennai in 1974. Prasad Productions made many memorable box office hits including Beti Bete (1964), Milan (1967), Khilona (1970), Sasural and Ek Duuje Ke Liye. L. V. Prasad contributed generously towards the establishment of L. V. Prasad Eye Institute in Hyderabad.

== Prasad Group ==
- Prasad Productions Pvt. Ltd.
- Prasad Film Labs.
- Prasad EFX.
- Prasad Video Digital.
- L.V.Prasad Film and Television Academy.
- Prasads Multiplex/Mall.
- Prasads IMAX.
- Prasad Panavision.
- DCE Dubai.
- DCE Singapore.
- Prasad Corp USA.

== Filmography ==
Assistant Director

- 1931 : Kamar-Al-Zaman (Silent)
- 1941 : Darpan (Hindi)
- 1941 : Tenali Ramakrishna (Telugu)
- 1942 : Gharana Donga (Telugu)
- 1943 : Dawal (Hindi)
- 1944 : Lady Doctor (Hindi)

Assistant Cinematographer

- 1938 : Stree (Hindi)

Actor

- 1931 : Alam Ara (Hindi)
- 1931 : Bhakta Prahlada (Telugu)
- 1931 : Kalidas (Telugu and Tamil Bilingual)
- 1933 : Sati Savitri (Telugu)
- 1933 : Sita Swayamvar (Hindi)
- 1940 : Bondam Pelli (Telugu)
- 1940 : Barrister Parvateesam
- 1940 : Chaduvukunna Bharya (Telugu)
- 1941 : Tenali Ramakrishna (Telugu)
- 1942 : Gharana Donga (Telugu)
- 1946 : Gruha Pravesam (Telugu)
- 1947 : Palnati Yuddham (Telugu)
- 1948 : Drohi (Telugu)
- 1953 : Pempudu Koduku (Telugu)
- 1981 : Raja Paarvai (Tamil)
- 1981 : Amavasya Chandrudu (Telugu)

Director

- 1946 : Gruha Pravesam (Telugu)
- 1947 : Palnati Yuddham (Telugu)
- 1948 : Drohi (Telugu)
- 1949 : Mana Desam (Telugu)
- 1950 : Shavukar (Telugu)
- 1950 : Samsaram (Telugu)
- 1952 : Pelli Chesi Choodu (Telugu)
- 1952 : Kalyanam Panni Paar (Tamil)
- 1952 : Rani (Tamil & Hindi)
- 1953 : Pempudu Koduku (Telugu)
- 1953 : Paradesi (Telugu)
- 1953 : Poongothai (Tamil)
- 1954 : Manohara (Tamil & Telugu)
- 1955 : Missamma (Telugu) / Missiamma (Tamil)
- 1955 : Mangaiyar Thilakam (Tamil)
- 1957 : Baagyavathi (Tamil)
- 1957 : Miss Mary (Hindi)
- 1957 : Sharada (Hindi)
- 1958 : Kadan Vaangi Kalyaanam (Tamil)
- 1958 : Appu Chesi Pappu Koodu (Telugu)
- 1959 : Chhoti Bahen (Hindi)
- 1961 : Thayilla Pillai (Tamil)
- 1963 : Iruvar Ullam (Tamil)
- 1964 : Beti Bete (Hindi)
- 1966 : Daadi Maa (Hindi)
- 1969 : Jeene Ki Raah (Hindi)
- 1972 : Shaadi Ke Baad (Hindi)
- 1974 : Bidaai (Hindi)
- 1977 : Jay Vejay (Hindi)

Producer

- 1956 : Ilavelpu (Telugu)
- 1957 : Sharada (Hindi)
- 1959 : Chhoti Bahen (Hindi)
- 1961 : Sasural (Hindi)
- 1963 : Hamrahi (Hindi)
- 1964 : Beti Bete (Hindi)
- 1965 : Illalu (Telugu)
- 1965 : Idaya Kamalam (Tamil)
- 1965 : Kalithozhan (Malayalam)
- 1966 : Daadi Maa (Hindi)
- 1967 : Milan (Hindi)
- 1968 : Raja Aur Runk (Hindi)
- 1969 : Jeene Ki Raah (Hindi)
- 1970 : Khilona (Hindi)
- 1972 : Shaadi Ke Baad (Hindi)
- 1974 : Bidaai (Hindi)
- 1975 : Piriya Vidai (Tamil)
- 1976 : Thande Makkalu (Kannada)
- 1976 : Udhar Ka Sindur (Hindi)
- 1977 : Jay Vejay (Hindi)
- 1978 : Mane Belagida Sose (Kannada)
- 1980 : Yeh Kaisa Insaf (Hindi)
- 1981 : Ek Duuje Ke Liye (Hindi)
- 1985 : Meraa Ghar Mere Bachche (Hindi)
- 1986 : Swati (Hindi)
- 1990 : Bidaai (Bengali)
- 1993 : Ardhana (Malayalam)
- 1994 : Nagpachami (Bengali)
- 1994 : Sandhyadhara (Bengali)
- 1996 : Mayer Katha (Bengali)
- 1996 : Sunapua (Oriya)

== Accolades ==
L. V. Prasad was the chairman of the 27th National Film Awards Selection Committee held at New Delhi in 1980. He was the chairman of the All India Selection Panel of Indian Panorama section for the 8th International Film Festival of India from 3 to 17 January 1981. Prasad was also the chairman of the International Jury for Children's Film Festival held in November 1981 at Madras. He was elected as the President of The South Indian Film Chamber of Commerce for the year 1982–83. He was a Member of the Board of Film Censors from October 1980 to February 1987. L. V. Prasad was Chairman of the Studio Owners, Council, a wing of Film Federation of India. The Government of India released a Commemorative postage stamp in his memory in 2006.

National Film Awards:

- Certificate of Merit for Best Feature Film in Tamil – Mangayar Thilakam (1956).
- National Film Award for Best Feature Film in Telugu – Bharya Bhartalu (1962).
- 1982 – Dadasaheb Phalke Award

Nandi Awards:

- Raghupathi Venkaiah Award (1980)

Filmfare Awards:

- Nominated – Best Film – Chhoti Bahen (1959)
- Nominated – Best Director – Chhoti Bahen (1959)
- Nominated – Best Film – Jeene Ki Raah (1969)
- Nominated – Best Director – Jeene Ki Raah (1969)
- Won – Best Film – Khilona (1970)
- Lifetime Achievement Award – South (1992)

Other Awards

- Raja Sandow Memorial Award for the year 1978–79 by the then Honorable Chief Minister of Tamil Nadu, Dr. M. G. Ramachandran at Madras
- Udyog Patra Award by the Honorable Vice-President of India, Mr. M.Hidayatullah at New Delhi on 20 December 1980
- Ramnath Award − 82 by the Cine Technicians' Association of South India on 5 June 1982
- Kalatapasvi Award by Telugu cinema weekly magazine Sitaara on 13 March 1983 at Hyderabad
- Kala Prapoorna award was conferred on him by Chancellor, Andhra University at Waltair (Old Visakhapatnam) on 21 December 1985
- Andhra Ratna award was conferred on L.V.Prasad by Andhra Pradesh Kalavedhika on 27 March 1987 at Hyderabad

== See also ==
- Raghupathi Venkaiah Award
