= Jikki =

Indian singer (1935 - 2004)

Kalaimamani P. G. Krishnaveni
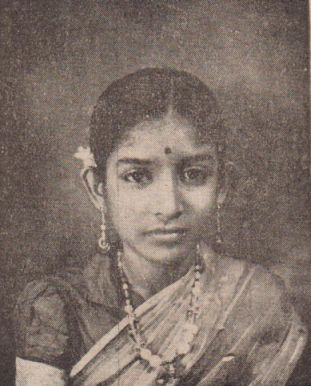
- Jikki in late 1940s

Background information
- Also known as: Jikki
- Born: P. G. Krishnaveni; 3 November 1935; Chennai
- Origin: Chandragiri, Madras Presidency, British India (now in Tirupati district, Andhra Pradesh, India)
- Died: 16 August 2004 (aged 68) Chennai, Tamil Nadu, India
- Genres: Film music (playback singing); Indian classical music
- Occupation: Singer
- Instrument: Vocalist
- Years active: 1948–2004
- Spouse: A. M. Rajah
- Award: Kalaimamani Award (1994)

Pillavalu Gajapathy Krishnaveni (3 November 1935 – 16 August 2004), more famously known as Jikki, was an Indian playback singer. She sang around 10,000 songs in Telugu, Tamil, Kannada, Malayalam, Sinhalese, and Hindi languages.

== Early life ==
Jikki was born into a Telugu family in Chennai on 3 November 1935. Her parents, Gajapathi Naidu and Rajakanthamma, had moved from Chandragiri, near Tirupati in Andhra Pradesh to Chennai for their livelihood.

Her uncle, Devaraju Naidu, worked as a music composer with the celebrated Kannada theatre and movie pioneer Gubbi Veeranna and this introduced the young Jikki to the music and film world.

== Career ==
Krishnaveni began her career as a child artist in 1943 and played a minor role in a Telugu movie named Panthulamma, directed by Gudavalli Ramabrahmam. In 1946, she appeared in the movie Mangalasutram, a remake of a Hollywood movie Excuse Me. She was already being noted for her musical prowess and her lilting mellifluous voice although she did not undergo any orthodox classical training in music at that stage.

A chance came her way to sing for the successful Tamil film Gnanasoundari in 1948 for which music was composed by the then doyen of film music, S. V. Venkatraman. The song was the super hit "Arul Thaarum Deva Maathaavey Aadhiyey Inba Jothi" for Kumari Rajamani who acted as the young girl growing into the young woman, M. V. Rajamma the heroine taking over the song with P. A. Periyanayaki singing as the scene advanced in time. This was the turning point in her life and changed the child actress Krishnaveni into a regular playback singer, Jikki, with offers of work for not only Tamil and Telugu films, but also for Kannada and Malayalam films.

She met her husband-to-be, A. M. Rajah, in 1950, when he was introduced in the Tamil film Samsaram as a new playback singer by Gemini's S. S. Vasan. He then introduced her to the Hindi film world by getting her to sing for his production Mr.Sampath in 1952. P. B. Srinivas also sang his first song in this film in a chorus. She also sang Sinhalese songs as well at that stage since the Sinhalese films were produced in Madras during those years.

Together with P. Leela, she reigned supreme in the South Indian film world in the early part of the 1950s, till P. Susheela took over the center stage from the late 1950s. Though they were in competition, they were fond of each other and behaved like two sisters and sang many songs together.

== Personal life ==
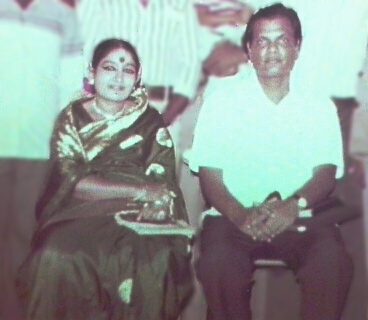
Jikki with her husband, A. M. Rajah

She was married to the playback singer and music director A. M. Rajah. Their duets have been hits. Jikki sang many songs under her husband's direction that are still played by radio stations. A. M. Raja and Jikki sang for live programmes in other countries such as U. S. A., Malaysia and Singapore.

A mother of six children, Jikki lost her husband when he slipped and fell between the tracks while boarding a train. The accident happened at Valliyur railway station in Tirunelveli district on 8 April 1989, when both of them were on their way to perform a concert in a temple in Kanyakumari district. After his death she stopped singing for some time. She came out of retirement and sang for Ilaiyaraja. She also started a music troupe with her two sons and performed in many countries including the United States, Malaysia and Singapore.

Once when she sang five songs for a Tamil film, she asked the producer Valampuri Somanathan to reduce her remuneration because he had given her the opportunity to sing so many songs in a single movie.

== Death ==
She had been suffering from breast cancer and had surgery, but the cancer spread to her kidneys and eventually liver. Several attempts were made to save her life by her close friend and singer K. Jamuna Rani which were supported by donations through musical nights and medical and financial support from the governments of Tamil Nadu and Andhra Pradesh.

The then Tamil Nadu chief minister J.Jayalalithaa and the Andhra Pradesh chief minister N. Chandrababu Naidu had granted Jikki 100,000 rupees from the Dr. MGR trust and 200,000 rupees respectively after hearing of her illness and her difficulty in meeting the treatment expenses.

She died on 16 August 2004 in Chennai.

== Awards and honours ==
- "Ugadi Puraskaram" by Madras Telugu Academy
- 1994: Received title of Kalaimamani Award by the Government of Tamil Nadu, which is the highest state honour in the field of Arts.

== Filmography ==
Jikki sang in 98 Telugu and 71 Tamil films.

=== Telugu ===
- Sri Lakshmamma Katha (1950)
- Palletoori Pilla (1950)
- Shavukaru (1950)
- Samsaram (1950)
- Patala Bhairavi (1951)
- Navvite Navaratnalu (1951)
- Dharmadevata (1952/I)
- Palletooru (1952)
- Prema Lekhalu (Aah) (1953)
- Bratuku Theruvu (1953)
- Devadasu (1953)
- Pardesi (1953)
- Pratigna (1953/I)
- Rechukka (1954)
- Todu Dongalu (1954)
- Donga Ramudu (1955)
- Rojulu Marayi (1955)
- Anarkali (1955)
- Ardhangi (1955)
- Chiranjeevulu (1956)
- Bhale Ramudu (1956)
- Edi Nijam (1956)
- Jayam Manade (1956)
- Kanakatara (1956)
- Penki Pellam (1956)
- Suvarna Sundari (1957/I)
- Maya Bazaar (Tamil, 1957)
- Bhale Bava (1957)
- Panduranga Mahatyam (1957)
- Sarangadhara (1957)
- Thodi Kodallu (1957)
- Chenchu Lakshmi (1958/I)
- Mangalya Balam (1958)
- Krishna Leelalu (1959)
- Raja Makutam (1959/I)
- Pelli Kaanuka (1960)
- Krishna Prema (1960)
- Sahasra Siracheda Apoorva Chinthamani (1960)
- Shantinivasam (1960)
- Sri Venkateswara Mahatyam (1960)
- Sri Seetha Rama Kalyanam (1961)
- Batasari (1961)
- Sabash Raja (1961)
- Thirudathe (1961)
- Bhishma (1962)
- Gulebakavali Katha (1962)
- Siri Sampadalu (1962)
- Tirupathamma Katha (1963)
- Lava Kusha (1963/I)
- Sampoorna Ramayanam (1971)
- Shrimanthudu (1971)
- Vattathukkul Chathuram (1978)
- Aditya 369 (1991)
- Seetharamaiah Gari Manavaralu (1991)
- Murari (2001)

=== Tamil ===
- Gnanasoundari (1948)
- Muthal Thethi (1955)
- Anarkali (1955)
- Aravalli (1957)
- Manthiri Kumari (1950)
- Naan Petra Selvam (1950)
- Pathala Bhairavi (1951)
- Singari (1951)
- Avan (1953)
- Asai Magan (1953)
- Edhir Paaradhadu (1954)
- Kalyanam Panniyum Brahmachari (1954)
- Illara Jothi (1954)
- Ethiparathathu (1954)
- Vaira Malai (1954)
- Nalla Thangai (1955)
- Gulebagavali (1955)
- Pennarasi (1955)
- Gomathiyin Kaadalan (1955)
- Mangaiyar Thilagam (1955)
- Kalyanam Seydhukko (1955)
- Paasa Valai (1956)
- Alibabavum 40 Thirudarkalum (1956)
- Amara Deepam (1956)
- Kokilavani (1956)
- Madurai Veeran (1956)
- Pennin Perumai (1956) - 4 songs
- Raja Rani (1956)
- Thaikku Pin Tharam (1956)
- Vazhvile Oru Naal (1956)
- Iru Sagodharigal (1957)
- Thangamalai Ragasiyam (1957)
- Karpuku Arasi (1957)
- Maya Bazar (1957)
- Nilai Malai Thieruden (1957)
- Samaya Sanjeevi (1957)
- Malliga (1957)
- Chakravarthy Thirumagal (1957)
- Mudhalai (1957)
- Puthumai Pitthan (1957)
- Senkottai Singam (1958)
- Thirumanam (1958)
- Vanggi Kotai Valiban (1958)
- Neelavukku Neranja Manasu (1958)
- Uthama Puthiran (1958)
- Pathi Bakthi (1958)
- Annaiyin Aanai (1958)
- Naadodi Mannan (1958)
- Kathavarayan (1958)
- Illarame Nallaram (1958)
- Manjal Magimai (1959)
- Sivagangai Cheemai (1959)
- Enga Veetu Mahalakshmi (1959)
- Kalyana Parisu (1959)
- Aaval Yaar (1959)
- Baaga Pirivinai (1959)
- Thaai Magalukku Kattiya Thaali (1959) - 3 songs
- Nalla Theerpu (1959)
- Ondru Pattal Undu Vazhvu (1960)
- Anbukor Anni (1960)
- Meenda Sorgam (1960)
- Kuzhandhaigal Kanda Kudiyarasu (1960)
- Mannathi Mannan (1960)
- Raja Desingu (1960)
- Thozhan (1960)
- Vidi Velli (1960)
- Punar Janmam (1961)
- Naan Vanagum Deivam (1963)
- Arunagiri Nadhar (1964)
- Bommai (1964)
- [[Sorgam (1970)
- Thaenum Paalum]] (1971)
- Pugunda Veedu (1972)
- Naan Yen Pirandhaen (1972)
- Puthumadha Bandham (1974)
- Enakoru Mahan Pirappaan (1975)
- Vatathukkul Sathuram (1978)
- Kannil Theriyum Kathaigal (1980)
- Avan (1985)
- Dharmam Vellum (1989)
- Paattukku Oru Thalaivan (1989)
- Pangali (1992)
- Senthamizh Pattu (1992)
- Aboorva Shakthi 369 (1992)
- Aasai (1995)
- Murati (2002)
- Anbu (2003)
