= Manorama filmography =

List of films featuring Manorama

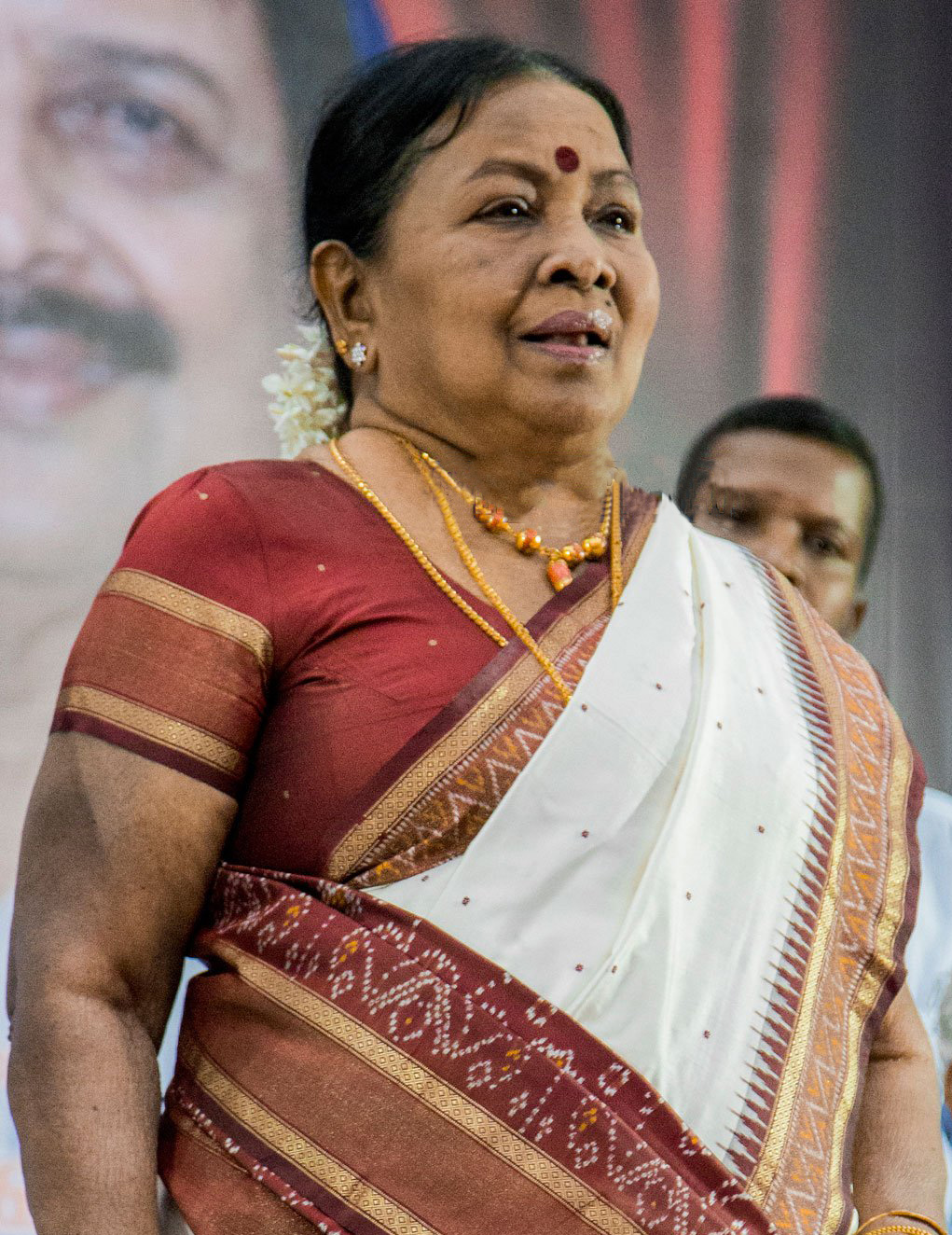
Manorama at Cinema Journalist Association Event

Gopishantha (26 May 1937 – 10 October 2015), better known by her stage name Manorama, was an Indian actress, comedian and playback singer who had appeared in more than 1500 films, 5,000 stage performances and several television series until 2015. She entered the Guinness World Records for acting in more than 1000 films in 1985. By 2015, she had acted in over 1500 films." She was a recipient of the Kalaimamani award. In 2002, Government of India awarded manorama with Padma Shri for her contribution to the arts. National Film Award for Best Supporting Actress for her performance in film Pudhiya Padhai (1989) and Filmfare Lifetime Achievement Award – South (1995).

== Television ==
1. Kattu Pattti Charitram
2. Anbulla Amma
3. Tyagiyin Magal
4. Vanavil
5. Aachi International
6. Anbulla Snehithi
7. Alli Rajyam
8. Malargal
9. Aval
10. Robo Raja
11. Manushi
12. Vaa Vadhyare
13. Tina Mina
14. Akkarapacha (Malayalam)
15. IMSAI Arasigal
16. Musirama
17. Kalyanamam Kalyanam

== Films ==
=== 1950s ===
Year	Title	Role	Notes
1958	Anbu Engey		
1958	Maalaiyitta Mangai		
1958	Periya Kovil		
1958	Manamulla Maruthaaram		
1959	Abalai Anjugam		
1959	Naan Sollum Ragasiyam	Kamakshi	
1959	Annaiyum Pidhavum		

=== 1960s ===
Year	Title	Role	Notes
1960	Kalathur Kannamma	Amali	
1960	Meenda Sorgam	Sachu	
1960	Aadavantha Deivam	Navarasam	
1960	Ponni Thirunaal		
1960	Rathinapuri Ilavarasi		
1960	Thanthaikku Pin Thamaiyan		
1960	Thilakam		
1960	Yanai Paagan	Valli	
1960	Uthami Petra Rathinam		
1961	Palum Pazhamum		
1962	Deivathin Deivam		
1962	Nenjil Or Aalayam	Manorama	
1962	Ethaiyum Thangum Ithaiyam		
1962	Muthu Mandapam		
1962	Padithal Mattum Podhuma		
1962	Policekaran Magal	Maari's Fiancée	
1962	Naagamalai Azhagi		
1962	Vadivukku Valai Kappu		
1962	Veera Thirumugan		
1963	Lava Kusha	Washerman's wife	
1963	Konjum Kumari	Alli	
1963	Paar Magale Paar	Aaraveli	
1963	Kunkhumam	Kanniyamma	
1963	Kuberatheevu		
1963	Kulamagal Radhai	Muthamma	
1963	Ratha Thilagam		
1963	Nenjam Marappathillai	Kanniyamma	
1963	Neengadha Ninaivu		
1963	Yarukku Sontham		
1963	Naanum Oru Penn		
1963	Ninaipadharku Neramillai		
1963	Anandha Jodhi	Mano	
1963	Karpagam		
1963	Kaanchi Thalaivan	Singaari	
1963	Ezhai Pangalan		
1963	Idhu Sathiyam		
1964	Magale Un Samathu		
1964	Thaali Bhagyam	Andjalai	
1964	Puthiya Paravai	Alli Sanjeev	
1964	Padagotti	Manickam's sister	
1964	Navarathri	Insane lady	
1964	Vettaikaaran	Jokkar's wife	
1964	Thozhilali	Chandira	
1964	Deiva Thirumagal	Chandira	
1964	Server Sundaram		Guest appearance
1964	Poompuhar		
1964	Thaayin Madiyil		
1964	En Kadamai	Panchavarnam	
1965	Anandhi	Manoranjitham	
1965	Thiruvilayadal	Ponni	
1965	Kanni Thaai	Rukkumani (Rukku)	
1965	Thazhampoo		
1965	Kalangarai Vilakkam	Moghini	
1965	Kalyana Mandapam		Guest appearance
1965	Paditha Manaivi		
1965	Enga Veetu Penn		
1965	Poojaikku Vandha Malar	Manju	
1965	Panchavarna Kili	Meena	
1965	Anbu Karangal	Ponnamma	
1965	Vallavanaukku Vallavan	Mala	
1965	Poomalai	Myna	
1965	Santhi	Sundari	
1965	Thaayum Magalum		
1966	Anbe Vaa	Kannamma	
1966	Sadhu Mirandal	Karpagam	
1966	Saraswathi Sabatham	Malli	
1966	Yaar Nee?	Thamarai(Maid) & C.I.D Sulokchana	
1966	Madras to Pondicherry	Brahmin woman	
1966	Mugaraasi	Alangaram (Thandhaiyar Paithai)	
1966	Chandhrodhayam	Ahalya	
1966	Thenmazhai	Indra	
1966	Mani Magudam	Vanchi	
1966	Gowri Kalyanam		
1966	Thaali Bhagyam	Andjalai	
1966	Iru Vallavargal		
1966	Parakkum Paavai	Dilruba	
1966	Thanipiravi	Gowry	
1966	Thaaye Unakkaga	Padma	
1966	Annavin Aasai		
1967	Vivasayee	Shoki	
1967	Thiruvarutchelvar	Ponna's wife	
1967	Thaikku Thalaimagan	Munimma	
1967	Ninaivil Nindraval	Sarala	
1967	Paaladai		
1967	Kandhan Karunai	Valli's friend	
1967	Iru Malargal	Poongothai	
1967	Anubavam Pudhumai		
1967	Aalayam		
1967	Anubavi Raja Anubavi	Muthamma	
1967	Naan	Poongothai	
1967	Thanga Thambi		
1967	Vivasaaye	Chokki	
1967	Seetha		
1967	Deiva Thirumagal		
1967	Bhavani		
1968	Ethir Neechal	Renu	
1968	Thirumal Perumai	Cameo appearance	
1968	Galatta Kalyanam	Rathna	
1968	Bommalattam	Chinna Ponnu	
1968	Thillana Mohanambal	Karuppayi / "Jil Jil" Ramamani / Roja Rani	Tamil Nadu State Film Award for Best Character Artiste (Female)
1968	Enga Oor Raja		
1968	Thaer Thiruvizha	Vel's wife	
1968	Uyarndha Manithan	Rani	
1968	Delhi Mapillai	Saroja	
1968	Andru Kanda Mugam	Devi	
1968	Kanavan	Thenmozhi	
1968	Kadhal Vaaganam	Kokila	
1968	Kuzhanthaikkaga	Constable's wife	
1968	Panakkara Pillai		
1968	Ner Vazhi		
1968	Chakkaram		
1968	Deiviga Uravu		
1969	Aayiram Poi	Lilly	
1969	Gurudhatchanai	Jaggamma	
1969	Anjal Petti 520	Loosie	
1969	Nirai Kudam	Actress Girija	
1969	Aindhu Laksham	Manju	
1969	Annaiyum Pithavum		
1969	Kanne Pappa	Roopa	
1969	Ponnu Mappillai	Saraswathi	Guest Appearance
1969	Poova Thalaiya	Indra	
1969	Thanga Malar		
1969	Vaa Raja Vaa		
1969	Ulagum Ivvalavudhan		
1969	Mahizampoo		

=== 1970s ===
Year	Title	Role	Notes
1970	Thalaivan	Palamma	
1970	Yaanai Valartha Vaanampadi Magan		
1970	Engal Thangam	Miss Pantchali	
1970	Thirumalai Thenkumari	Munniyamma	
1970	Vilaiyaattu Pillai		
1970	Dharisanam		
1971	Kankatchi		Suruli Rajan and Manorama teamed up in this movie to perform nine different roles together
1971	Arunodhayam	Radha	
1971	Thanga Gopuram		
1971	Muhammad bin Tughkug	Gandhimadhi	
1971	Annai Velankanni	Doll seller	
1971	Justice Viswanathan	Kanniamma	
1971	Neerum Neruppum	Ammuni	
1972	Pattikada Pattanama	Vellaiamma	
1972	Kasethan Kadavulada	Lakshmi	
1972	Needhi	Ponnamma	
1972	Kanna Nalama	K. Manorama	
1972	Raman Thediya Seethai	Samoundhi	
1972	Thaikku Oru Pillai		
1972	Velli Vizha	Komalam	
1972	Mr.Sampath		
1972	Agathiyar	Komalam	
1972	Annamitta Kai	Nurse Thangame	
1972	Gnana Oli	Valliayammal	
1972	Shakthi Leelai	Kaveri	
1972	Karunthel Kannayiram		
1972	Thavapudhalavan		
1972	Kadhalikka Vanga	Ganga	
1972	Aval		
1972	Annai Abhirami		
1972	Appa Tata		
1972	Jakkamma		
1972	Puguntha Veedu		
1972	Rani Yaar Kuzhanthai		
1972	Unakkum Enakkum		
1973	Bharatha Vilas	Meera bai	
1973	Rajaraja Cholan	Poonkodi	
1973	Suryakanthi	Annam	
1973	Kasi Yathirai	Andal (Stage-actress)/Lalitha(Chokkalingam's lover)	
1973	Alaigal	Nalina	
1973	Manipayal	Andal	
1973	Ganga Gowri		
1973	Thirumalai Deivam	Ramayee	
1973	Ponnunjal	Veeramma	
1973	Manidharil Manikkam	Rukmani	
1973	Rajapart Rangadurai	Chinthamani	
1973	Ponnukku Thanga Manasu		
1973	Pillai Selvam		
1973	Anbu Sagodharargal		
1973	Deiva Kuzhandhaigal		
1973	Engal Thaai		
1973	Karaikkal Ammaiyar	Pallavi	
1973	Kattila Thottila	Manoramai	
1973	Manjal Kungumam		
1973	Maru Piravi		
1973	Nalla Mudivu		
1973	Petha Manam Pithu		
1973	Ponvandu	Rathna Devi	
1973	Prarthanai		
1973	Shanmugapriya		
1973	Thedi Vandha Lakshmi	Geetha	
1973	Vayadi		
1973	Vakkuruthi		
1973	Veettukku Vandha Marumagal		
1974	Thaai	Palakadu Pappamma	
1974	Thanga Pathakkam	Muthammal	
1974	En Magan	Namakalu	
1974	Anbai Thedi		
1974	Gumasthavin Magal		Guest appearance
1974	Avalum Penn Thaane		
1974	Athaiya Mamiya		
1974	Devi Sri Karumari Amman		
1974	Ore Satchi		
1974	Onne Onnu Kanne Kannu		
1974	Kanmani Raja		
1974	Engal Kula Dheivam		
1974	Engamma Sapatham		
1974	Thirudi		
1974	Prayachittham		
1974	Pathu Madha Bandham		
1974	Ungal Viruppam		
1974	Samayalkaran		
1974	Unnaithan Thambi		
1974	Thanga Valayal		
1974	Idhayam Parkiradhu		
1975	Puthu Vellam		
1975	Maalai Sooda Vaa		
1975	Thottadhellam Ponnaagum		
1975	Melnaattu Marumagal		Guest appearance
1975	Cinema Paithiyam		Cameo appearance
1975	Aayirathil Oruthi		Cameo appearance
1975	Andharangam	Chellamma	
1975	Anbe Aaruyire	Alamelu	
1975	Yarukku Maappillai Yaro		
1975	Dr. Siva		
1975	Thangathile Vairam		
1975	Pattampoochi	Kumari	
1975	Enakkoru Magan Pirappen		
1975	Pattikkaattu Raja	Alamelu	
1975	Vaazhnthu Kaattugiren	Dollak Sundari	
1975	Paattum Bharathamum	Mohana	
1975	Yarukkum Vetkam Illai		
1975	Then Sindhudhe Vaanam		
1975	Karotti Kannan		
1976	Akka		
1976	Unakkaga Naan		
1976	Unmaye Un Vilai Enna		
1976	Rojavin Raja		
1976	Nee Oru Maharani		
1976	Mogam Muppadhu Varusham	Raji	
1976	Gruhapravesam	Arulmozhi	
1976	Varaprasadham		
1976	Bhadrakali		
1976	Vazhvu En Pakkam	Seetha	
1976	Ungalil Oruthi		
1976	Perum Pugazhum		
1976	Paaloothi Valartha Kili		
1976	Oru Kodiyil Iru Malargal		
1976	Nalla Penmani		
1976	Muthaana Muthullavaa		
1976	Mayor Meenakshi		
1976	Kula Gowravam		
1976	Janaki Sabatham		
1976	Madhana Maaligai		
1976	Seervarisai		
1976	Nee Oru Maharani		
1976	Rojavin Raja		
1976	Kaalangalil Aval Vasantham	Kalyani	
1977	Aalukkoru Aasai		
1977	Avan Oru Sarithiram		
1977	Aaru Pushpangal	Meera	
1977	Aasai Manaivi		
1977	Olimayana Ethirakalam		
1977	Durga Devi		
1977	Dheepam		
1977	Thunai Iruppal Meenakshi		
1977	Nee Vazhva Vendum		
1977	Ilaya Thalaimurai	Ambujam Maami	
1977	Penn Jenmam		
1977	Annan Oru Koyil	Jayamuniyamma	
1977	Sri Krishna Leela	Abinayasundari	
1977	Unnai Suttrum Ulagam	Actress	
1977	Balaparichai		
1977	Etharkum Thuninthavan		
1977	Chakravarthy		
1977	Deviyin Thirumanam		
1977	Kalamadi Kalam		
1977	Odi Vilayadu Thatha		
1977	Uyarndhavargal	Guest role	
1977	Perumaikuriyaval		
1978	Andaman Kadhali	Abinayasundari	
1978	Annalakshmi		
1978	Maariyamman Thiruvizha		
1978	Kamakshiyin Karunai		
1978	Thyagam		
1978	Chittukuruvi		
1978	En Kelvikkenna Bathil		
1978	Pilot Premnath	Balu's wife	
1978	Punniya Boomi		
1978	Vandikkaaran Magal		
1978	Varuvaan Vadivelan	Alli	
1978	Vaazha Ninaithal Vazhaalam		
1978	Rudra Thaandavam		
1978	Aayiram Jenmangal	Annaporani	
1978	Bhairavi	Meenatchi	
1978	General Chakravarthi	Ponnamma	
1978	Aval Thandha Uravu		
1978	Annapoorani		
1978	Radhai Ketra Kannan		
1978	Kannan Oru Kai Kuzhandhai		
1978	Manidharil Ithanai Nirangala!		
1978	Sakka Podu Podu Raja		
1978	Unakkum Vazhvu Varum		
1978	Shankar Salim Simon	Mariyamma	
1978	Vanakkatukuriya Kathaliye	Sevanthi	
1978	Taxi Driver		
1978	Ganga Yamuna Kaveri		
1979	Kuppathu Raja	Pavunu	
1979	Alankari		
1979	Veettukku Veedu Vasappadi	Panchali	
1979	Imayam		
1979	Nallathoru Kudumbam	Santhanalaxmi	
1979	Kalyanaraman	Rangamani	
1979	Enippadigal	Jayanthi	
1979	Uthiripookkal		
1979	Velum Mayilum Thunai	Manohari	
1979	Gnana Kuzhandhai	Alangari	
1979	Aadu Pambe		
1979	Pancha Bhootham		
1979	Kamasasthiram		
1979	Sigappukkal Mookkuthi		

=== 1980s ===
Year	Title	Role	Notes
1980	Billa		
1980	Ennadi Meenakshi		
1980	Nadagame Ulagam		
1980	Neechalkulam		
1980	Panchabhootham		
1980	Poonthalir		
1980	Sri Ramajayam		
1980	Soolam		
1980	Rusi Kanda Poonai		
1980	Rishi Moolam		
1980	Natchathiram		
1980	Jamboo		
1980	Avan Aval Adhu		
1980	Dharma Raja		
1980	Kaalam Badhil Sollum		
1980	Edhir Veettu Jannal		
1980	Geetha Oru Shenbagapoo		
1980	Muyalakku Moonu Kaal		
1980	Naan Potta Savaal		
1980	Ratha Paadam		
1980	Saranam Ayyappa		
1980	Vishwaroopam		
1980	Bombay Mail 109		
1980	Oru Marathu Paravaigal		
1980	Kaali		
1980	Paruvathin Vasaliley		
1980	Savithiri		
1981	Kodeeswaran Magal		
1981	Keezh Vaanam Sivakkum		
1981	Thee		
1981	Savaal		
1981	Erattai Manithan		
1981	Lorry Driver Rajakannu		
1981	Anicha Malar		
1981	Karaiyellam Shenbagapoo		
1981	Bala Nagamma		
1981	Ellam Inba Mayyam		
1981	Nenjile Thunivirunthal		
1981	Pattam Padhavi		
1981	Rajangam		
1981	Nenjil Oru Mul		
1982	Vazhvey Maayam		
1982	Simla Special		
1982	Thaai Mookaambikai		
1982	Sangili		
1982	Theerpu		
1982	Manal Kayiru		
1982	Marumagale Vaazhga		
1982	Kannodu Kan		
1982	Jodippura		
1982	Vasandhathil Or Naal		
1982	Pokkiri Raja		
1982	Pakkathu Veetu Roja		
1982	Vasandhathil Or Naal		
1982	Sattam Sirikkiradhu		
1982	Archanai Pookal		
1982	Erattai Manithan		
1982	Kathoduthan Naan Pesuven		
1982	Neethi Devan Mayakkam		
1982	Paritchaikku Neramaachu		
1982	Manamadurai Malli		
1982	Boom Boom Madu		
1982	Nenjangal		
1983	Sattam		
1983	Dowry Kalyanam		
1983	Sivappu Sooriyan		
1983	Miruthanga Chakravarthi		
1983	Neethibathi		
1983	Nirabarathi		
1983	Thanga Magan		
1983	Adutha Varisu		
1983	Paayum Puli		
1983	Yamirukku Bayamen		
1983	Sandhippu		
1983	Muthu Engal Sothu		
1983	Antha Sila Naatkal		
1983	Imaigal		
1983	Indru Nee Nalai Naan		
1983	Kalvadiyum Pookal		
1983	Muthu Engal Sothu		
1983	Oru Kai Pappom		
1983	Thalaimagan		
1983	Uruvangal Maralam		
1983	Vellai Roja		
1983	Villiyanur Matha		
1983	Saranalayam		
1983	Kai Varisai		
1984	Enakkul Oruvan		
1984	Kairaasikkaaran		
1984	Mansoru		
1984	Maman Machan		
1984	Oh Maane Maane		
1984	Kuva Kuva Vaathugal		
1984	Anbe Odi Vaa		
1984	Kudumbam		
1984	Raja Veetu Kannukutty		
1984	Ninaivugal		
1984	Naalai Unathu Naal		
1984	Alaya Deepam		
1984	Amma Irukka		
1984	Chiranjeevi		
1984	Iru Medhaigal		
1984	Simma Soppanam		
1984	Unga Veetu Pillai		
1984	Vellai Pura Ondru		
1984	Urimai Thedum Uravu		
1984	Vaazhkai		
1984	Vaai Sollil Veeranadi		
1984	Nyayam		
1984	Madras Vathiyar		
1985	Antha Sila Naatkal		
1985	Aagaya Thamaraigal		
1985	Iru Methaigal		
1985	Madras Vaathiyaar		
1985	Sri Raghavendrar		
1985	Vidhi		
1985	Ilamai		
1985	Simma Soppanam		
1985	Nyaayam		
1985	Ninaivugal		
1985	Rajathi Rojakili		
1985	Deivapiravi		
1985	Chidambara Ragasiyam		
1985	Jhansi		
1985	Anni		
1985	Aasha		
1985	Kadivalam		
1985	Bandham		
1985	Nalla Thambi		
1985	Oru Malarin Payanam		
1985	Mangamma Sabatham		
1985	Chinna Veedu		
1985	Irandu Manam		
1985	Karaiyai Thodadha Alaigal		
1985	Nermai		
1985	Perumai		
1985	Karpoora Deepam		
1985	Ketti Melam		
1985	Poruttham		
1985	Unnai Thedi Varuven		
1985	Thanga Mama 3D		
1985	Thendral Thodatha Malar		
1986	Vikram		
1986	Samsaram Adhu Minsaram	Kannamma	
1986	Kaaval		
1986	Nermai		
1986	Perumai		
1986	Marumagal		
1986	Maragatha Veenai		
1986	Chandamama		
1986	Odangal		
1986	Pookkalai Parikkatheergal		
1986	Kaithiyin Theerppu		
1986	Veeran		
1986	Kulirkaala Megangal		
1986	Kanna Thorakkanum Saami		
1986	Sarvam Sakthimayam		
1986	Nambinar Keduvathillai		
1986	Nilave Malare		
1986	Annai En Dheivam		
1986	Engal Thaikulame Varuge		
1986	Kodai Mazhai		
1986	Naan Adimai Illai		
1986	Paaru Paaru Pattanam Paaru		
1987	Per Sollum Pillai		
1987	Naan Adimai Illai		
1987	Makkal Enn Pakkam		
1987	Paruva Ragam		
1987	Premaloka		
1987	Valayal Satham		
1987	Sankar Guru		
1987	Chinna Kuyil Paaduthu		
1987	Kathai Kathayam Karanamam		
1987	Manaivi Ready		
1987	Ullam Kavarntha Kalvan		
1987	Oorkavalan		
1987	Poo Poova Poothirukku		
1987	Anbulla Appa		
1987	Sonthamadi Nee Enakku		
1987	Muthukkal Moondru		
1987	My Dear Lisa		
1987	Ore Raththam		
1987	Vairagyam		
1987	Kavalan Avan Kovalan	Herself	Guest appearance
1988	Guru Sishyan		
1988	Paatti Sollai Thattathe		
1988	En Jeevan Paduthu		
1988	Kathanayagan		
1988	Unnal Mudiyum Thambi		
1988	Idhu Namma Aalu		
1988	Thambi Thanga Kambi		
1988	Penmani Aval Kanmani		
1988	Annanagar Mudhal Theru	Shenbagam	
1988	Vasanthi		
1988	Dhayam Onnu		
1988	Manamagale Vaa		
1988	Rayilukku Neramachu		
1988	Paadatha Thenikkal		
1988	Mappillai Sir		
1989	Kutravaali		
1989	Ulagam Piranthathu Enakkaga		
1989	Aararo Aariraro		
1989	Apoorva Sagodharargal		
1989	Puthiya Padhai		National Film Award for Best Supporting Actress
1989	Meenakshi Thiruvilayadal		
1989	Raaja Raajathan		
1989	Pongi Varum Kaveri		
1989	Dharma Devan		
1989	Sakalakala Sammandhi		
1989	Sontham 16		
1989	Thangamana Purushan		
1989	Vizhiyora Kavidhaigal		
1989	Thaaya Thaarama		
1989	Vetri Mel Vetri		

=== 1990s ===
Year	Title	Role
1990	En Veedu En Kanavar	
1990	Michael Madana Kama Rajan	Ganga Bai
1990	Engal Swamy Ayyappan	
1990	Ethir Kaatru	
1990	Nadigan	Baby Amma
1990	Engitta Mothathay	Pandiyan's mother
1990	Kizhakku Vasal	
1990	Sathya Vaakku	
1990	Vedikkai En Vadikkai	
1990	Aarathi Edungadi	
1990	Murugane Thunai	Ranganayaki
1990	Aavathellam Pennale	
1990	Pattanathil Petti	
1990	Avanga Namma Ooru Ponnunga	Manohariyamma
1990	Namathu Deivam	
1990	Kavalukku Kettikaran	Ponnuthayi
1990	Kalyana Rasi	
1990	Seetha	Boopathy's mother
1990	Madurai Veeran Enga Saami	
1991	Aadi Viratham	
1991	Pondatti Sonna Kettukanum	
1991	Chinna Thambi	Kannamma
1991	Marikozhundhu	Seenu's mother
1991	Nanbargal	
1991	Pudhu Manithan	Pangajam
1991	Idhayam	Raja's mother
1991	Gnana Paravai	
1991	Nattukku Oru Nallavan	Subhash's mother
1991	Pondatti Pondattithan	Rajagopal's grandmother
1991	Iyumbathilum Aasai Varum	
1991	Kurumbukkaran	
1991	Iravu Sooriyan	
1991	Nee Pathi Naan Pathi	Vedavalli
1991	MGR Nagaril	Shobhana's grandmother
1991	Mookuthi Poo Meley	Doctor
1992	Mannan	Azhagi
1992	Singaravelan	Thaiyamma
1992	Pangali	Durai's mother
1992	Annaamalai	Annamalai's mother
1992	Magudam	Muthuvelu's grandmother
1992	Suriyan	Chettiyaaramma
1992	Rasukutty	Eswari
1992	Onna Irukka Kathukanum	
1992	Pattathu Raani	Muniamma
1992	Harihara Puthiran	
1992	Neenga Nalla Irukkanum	
1992	Thoorathu Sontham	
1992	Kasthuri Manjal	Chellathai
1992	Tamil Ponnu	
1992	Periya Gounder Ponnu	Thangamuthu's mother
1992	Idhu Namma Bhoomi	Valliammai
1992	Unnai Vaazhthi Paadugiren	Ravi's mother
1992	Pandithurai	Pandithurai's mother
1992	Brahmachari	Malathi's grandmother
1992	Chinna Gounder	Chinna Gounder's mother
1992	Endrum Anbudan	
1992	Kaviya Thalaivan	Vellaiamma
1993	Yejaman	Grandmother of Vaanavarayan
1993	Gentleman	Ponnammal, Kicha's mother
1993	Ponnumani	
1993	Uthama Raasa	
1993	Maathangal Ezhu	
1993	Dharmaseelan	Mother Mary
1993	Senthoorapandi	Senthoorapandi's mother
1993	Pangali	
1993	Nallathe Nadakkum	Valliammal
1993	Rakkayi Koyil	Jakkamma
1993	Ezhai Jaathi	Nagamma
1993	I Love India	Priya's mother
1994	May Madham	Aandal
1994	Deva	Raasathi
1994	Jaihind	Bharath's mother
1994	Sarigamapadani	Kulasekaran's mother
1994	Seeman	
1994	Kaadhalan	Shruthi's grandma
1994	Vietnam Colony	Gayathri's mother
1994	Rasigan	Vijay's grandmother
1994	Ravanan	Ravanan's mother
1994	Nattamai	Nattamai's paternal aunt
1994	Thaai Manasu	Muthamma
1994	Sindhu Nathi Poo	Appayi
1994	Honest Raj	Maragatham
1994	Jallikattu Kaalai	Subbulakshmi
1994	Atha Maga Rathiname	Pappamma
1995	Murai Maman	Sirusu's mother
1995	Dear Son Maruthu	Kannamma
1995	Marumagan	Thaiyamma
1995	Coolie	
1995	Periya Kudumbam	Rathnavelu's Mother
1995	Thirumoorthy	Ram Aatha
1995	Nandhavana Theru	
1995	Naan Petha Magane	Andal
1995	Veluchami	Chinnamma's grandmother
1995	Mr. Madras	Aruna Arunachalam
1995	Muthu Kaalai	Raakayi
1995	Maaman Magal	Shanmugam's mother
1995	Raja Enga Raja	
1995	Chellakannu	Kaliyamurthy
1995	Deva	Raasathi
1995	Neela Kuyil	Kaattayi
1995	Anbu Magan	
1996	Parambarai	Paramasivan's grandmother
1996	Mahaprabhu	Vellamma
1996	Indian	Kuppamma
1996	Nattupura Pattu	Pattamma
1996	Love Birds	
1997	Sakthi	Velammal
1997	Arunachalam	Vedhavalli's grandmother
1997	Vallal	Kamakshi
1998	Pooveli	Grandmother of Mahalakshmi
1998	Natpukkaga	Muthaiya's mother
1998	Veera Thalattu	
1998	Marumalarchi	Jayanthi's mother in law
1998	Natpukkaga	Muthaiya's mother
1998	Poonthottam	Sundari's grandmother
1998	Dharma	Sharmila's grandmother
1998	Moovendhar	Guest appearance
1998	En Aasai Rasave	
1998	Simmarasi	Manickavasagam's mother
1998	Veeram Vilanja Mannu	Virumayi
1999	Rojavanam	
1999	Unnai Thedi	
1999	Periyanna	
1999	Kummi Paattu	
1999	Poovellam Kettuppar	Herself
1999	Unnaruge Naan Irundhal	Caring maid
1999	Edhirum Pudhirum	Kannan's mother
1999	Sundari Neeyum Sundaran Naanum	Subramani's mother

=== 2000s ===
Year	Title	Role	Notes
2000	Kannal Paesava		
2000	Vetri Kodi Kattu	Deivane	
2000	Thirunelveli	Thulasi's mother	
2000	Kannan Varuvaan	Rangganayagi (Aatha)	
2000	Snegithiye	Vani's mother	
2000	Unnaruge Naan Irundhal	Caring maid	
2000	Maayi		
2000	Doubles		
2000	Karisakattu Poove		
2000	Simmasanam	Sathyamurthy's mother	
2001	Krishna Krishna	'Bullet' Pushpa	
2001	Pandavar Bhoomi	Dhanasekar's mother	
2001	Seerivarum Kaalai		
2001	Piriyadha Varam Vendum	Azhagi	
2001	Sigamani Ramamani	Vidhya	
2001	Vaanchinathan		
2001	Thaalikaatha Kaaliamman	Kamachi	
2001	Vinnukum Mannukum		
2001	Chithiram		Partially reshot version
2002	Thamizh	Thamizh's mother	
2002	Jaya		
2002	Gemini	Annamma	
2002	Namma Veetu Kalyanam		
2002	Karmegam	Karmegham's mother	
2002	Manorama The Legend	Herself	
2002	Kadhal Virus	Aavudai Aachi	
2002	Andipatti Arasampatti	Andipatti's mother	
2003	Saamy	Bhuvana's Grandmother	
2003	Diwaan	Duraisingam's sister	
2003	Whistle		
2003	Anbe Anbe	Vishali	
2003	Ottran	Karthik's Mother	
2003	Yes Madam		
2004	Perazhagan	Pattamma	
2004	7G Rainbow Colony	Shweta's aunt	
2004	Kuthu	Anjali's grandmother	
2004	Neranja Manasu	Ayyanar's grandmother	
2004	Azhagesan	Nandini's grandmother	
2004	Super Da		
2004	Jana	Manimekhalai's grandmother	
2005	Karka Kasadara		
2005	Aadum Koothu	Dalit woman	
2006	Pasa Kiligal		
2006	Unarchigal		
2006	Imsai Arasan 23 m Pulikesi	Rajamatha Bhavani Ammaiyar	
2007	Aalwar	Priya's grandma	
2007	Thaamirabharani	Thangapazham	
2007	Periyar		
2008	Uliyin Osai	Azhagi	
2009	Laadam		
2009	A Aa E Ee		
2009	Naal Natchathiram	Nagamma	
2009	Pudhiya Payanam	Maami	

=== 2010s ===
Year	Title	Role	Notes
2010	Singam	Kavya's grandmother	
2010	Irumbukkottai Murattu Singam	Keluthi Amma	
2010	Kaadhal Alla Adhaiyum Thaandi		
2012	Valiban Sutrum Ulagam		
2013	Singam II	Kavya's grandmother	
2013	Thaaye Nee Kannurangu	Amma	short film
2013	Kaadhaley Ennai Kaadhaleeee	Santhosh's Grandmother	
2017	Singam III	Kavya's grandmother	Recreated version

=== Telugu films ===
Year	Title	Role
1970	Sambarala Rambabu	
1971	Adavi Veerulu	
1974	Premalu Pellillu	Puppy
1975	Moguda Pellama	
1976	Pellikani Tandri	
1980	Subhodhayam	
1980	Kaali	
1981	Prema Kanuka	
1981	Bala Nagamma	
1982	Edi Dharmam Edi Nyayam	
1983	Ikanaina Marandi	
1984	Gadusu Pindam	
1986	Prema Gharshana	
1987	Chinnari Devatha	Seetha's mother
1988	Mr. Hero	
1990	Guru Sishyulu	Manjula
1990	Kaliyuga Rudrulu	
1992	Akka Mogudu	
1993	Kunti Puthrudu	
1993	Allari Priyudu	Raja's grandmother
1993	Mogudu Garu	
1994	Police Brothers	
1994	Mayadari Mosagadu	
1994	Bhairava Dweepam	
1995	Rikshavodu	Bamma
1997	Pancharam	
1998	Paradesi	
1999	Speed Dancer	Durgamma
1999	Mechanic Mavayya	
1999	Sambayya	Sambayya's mother
2000	Manasunna Maaraju	
2001	Bava Nachadu	Mrs. S. Bhanupathi
2002	Nee Premakai	Srinivas' mother
2002	Ninu Choodaka Nenundalenu	
2002	Police Sisters	
2004	7G Brindavan Colony	Swetha's aunt
2004	Vijayendra Varma	Fathima
2005	Narasimhudu	
2006	Seethakoka Chiluka	
2008	Krishnarjuna	Arjun's grandmother
2009	Arundhati	Chandramma

=== Malayalam films ===
Year	Title	Role	Notes
1971	Aana Valarthiya Vanampadiyude Makan		
1972	Vidhyarthikale Ithile Ithile		
1978	Prathyaksha Deivam		
1983	Snehabandham		
1985	Madhuvidhu Theerum Mumbe		
1987	Aankiliyude Tharattu		
1987	Veendum Lisa		
1991	Aakasha Kottayile Sultan	Kumudam	
2000	Millenium Stars		
2002	Aradyam Parayum		
2007	Mauryan		
2009	Seetha Kalyanam	Sreeni's mother	
2015	Oru Second Class Yathra		Archive only

=== Kannada films ===
Year	Title	Role
1975	Devara Gudi	
1975	Ninagagi Naanu	
1975	Hennu Samsarada Kannu	
1977	Devara Duddu	Kempamma
1977	Geddvalu Naane	
1981	Premanubandha	
1991	Preethiye Nanna Daiva	Thayamma

=== Films in other languages ===
Year	Title	Role	Language	Notes
1957	Sukumali		Sinhalese	
1974	Kunwara Baap	Sheela	Hindi	

== See also ==
- List of Indian film actresses
