= List of Tamil films of 1963 =

Post-amendment to the Tamil Nadu Entertainments Tax Act 1939 on 1 April 1958, Gross jumped to 140 per cent of Nett Commercial Taxes Department disclosed ₹3.89 crore in entertainment tax revenue for the year.

The following is a list of films produced in the Tamil film industry in India in 1963, in alphabetical order.

== 1963 ==
Title	Director	Production	Music	Cast
Aasai Alaigal	A. S. A. Sami	Anbu Films	K. V. Mahadevan	S. S. Rajendran, C. R. Vijayakumari, M. R. Radha
Alapiranthavan	Nanabhai Bhatt		Vedha	
Anandha Jodhi	A. S. A. Sami & V. N. Reddy	Hariharan Films	Viswanathan–Ramamoorthy	M. G. Ramachandran, Devika, M. R. Radha, Kamal Haasan
Annai Illam	P. Madhavan	Kamala Pictures	K. V. Mahadevan	Sivaji Ganesan, Devika, R. Muthuraman, S. V. Ranga Rao
Arivaali	A. T. Krishnasami	A. T. K. Productions	S. V. Venkatraman	Sivaji Ganesan, P. Bhanumathi, T. R. Ramachandran, K. A. Thangavelu, T. P. Muthulakshmi
Aayiram Kalathu Payir	T. S. Durairaj	Master Pictures	S. M. Subbaiah Naidu	Kaka Radhakrishnan, ''Vairam'' Krishnamurthi, Radhabhai, K. G. Shanthi
Chitor Rani Padmini	Chithrapu Narayana Murthy	Uma Pictures	G. Ramanathan	Sivaji Ganesan, Vyjayanthimala, K. A. Thangavelu
Dharmam Thalai Kaakkum	M. A. Thirumugam	Devar Films	K. V. Mahadevan	M. G. Ramachandran, B. Saroja Devi, M. R. Radha
Ezhai Pangalan	K. Shankar	Rajalakshmi Pictures	K. V. Mahadevan	Gemini Ganesan, Ragini, Pushpalatha, Nagesh
Idhu Sathiyam	K. Shankar	Saravana Pictures	Viswanathan–Ramamoorthy	S. A. Ashokan, 'Gemini' Chandrakantha, V. Nagayya, P. Kannamba
Idhayathil Nee	V. Srinivasan	Muktha Films	Viswanathan–Ramamoorthy	Gemini Ganesan, M. R. Radha, Devika, K. A. Thangavelu, Nagesh
Iruvar Ullam	L. V. Prasad	Prasad Movies	K. V. Mahadevan	Sivaji Ganesan, B. Saroja Devi, M. R. Radha
Kadavulai Kanden	A. S. A. Sami	Balan Pictures	K. V. Mahadevan	Kalyan Kumar, Devika, M. R. Radha, J. P. Chandrababu, Sukumari
Kaithiyin Kathali	A. K. Velan	Arunachala Pictures	K. V. Mahadevan	S. S. Rajendran, C. R. Vijayakumari, S. A. Ashokan
Kalai Arasi	A. Kasilingam	Sarodi Brothers	K. V. Mahadevan	M. G. Ramachandran, P. Bhanumathi, Rajasree
Kalyaniyin Kanavan	S. M. Sriramulu Naidu	Pakshiraja Studios	S. M. Subbaiah Naidu	Sivaji Ganesan, B. Saroja Devi, M. R. Radha
Kaanchi Thalaivan	A. Kasilingam	Mekala Pictures	K. V. Mahadevan	M. G. Ramachandran, P. Bhanumathi, S. S. Rajendran, C. R. Vijayakumari
Karpagam	K. S. Gopalakrishnan	Amarjothi Movies	Viswanathan–Ramamoorthy	Gemini Ganesan, Savitri, K. R. Vijaya, R. Muthuraman
Kattu Roja	A. Subba Rao	Modern Theatres	K. V. Mahadevan	S. S. Rajendran, Padmini, M. R. Radha
Koduthu Vaithaval	P. Neelakantan	E. V. R. Pictures	K. V. Mahadevan	M. G. Ramachandran, M. R. Radha, E. V. Saroja, L. Vijayalakshmi
Konjum Kumari	G. Vishwanathan	Modern Theatres	Vedha	R. S. Manohar, Manorama
Kubera Theevu	G. Vishwanathan	Nithya Kalyani Films	C. N. Pandurangan	C. L. Anandan, Devika, Pandari Bai, Nagesh
Kulamagal Radhai	A. P. Nagarajan	Spider Films	K. V. Mahadevan	Sivaji Ganesan, B. Saroja Devi, Devika
Kunkhumam	Krishnan–Panju	Rajamani Pictures	K. V. Mahadevan	Sivaji Ganesan, S. S. Rajendran, C. R. Vijayakumari, R. Muthuraman, Sharada
Lava Kusa	C. Pullaiah, C. S. Rao	Lalitha Sivajothi Films	Songs: K. V. Mahadevan, background music: Ghantasala	N. T. Rama Rao, Gemini Ganesan, Anjali Devi, M. R. Radha
Mani Osai	P. Madhavan	A. L. S.Productions	Viswanathan–Ramamoorthy	Kalyan Kumar, Kumari Rukmini, M. R. Radha, R. Muthuraman, C. R. Vijayakumari, Pushpalatha
Manthiri Kumaran	B. Vittalacharya	Vittal Productions	Rajan–Nagendra	Kanta Rao, Rajasree, Anuradha
Naan Vanangum Dheivam	K. Somu	Sathya Narayana Films	K. V. Mahadevan	Sivaji Ganesan, Padmini, Ragini
Naanum Oru Penn	A. C. Tirulokchandar	AVM Productions	R. Sudarsanam	S. S. Rajendran, C. R. Vijayakumari, M. R. Radha, A. V. M. Rajan
Neethikkupin Paasam	M. A. Thirumugam	Devar Films	K. V. Mahadevan	M. G. Ramachandran, B. Saroja Devi, M. R. Radha
Neengadha Ninaivu	T. R. Raghunath	Padma Films	K. V. Mahadevan	S. S. Rajendran, C. R. Vijayakumari, Kalyan Kumar, Pushpalatha
Nenjam Marappathillai	C. V. Sridhar	Manohar Pictures	Viswanathan–Ramamoorthy	Kalyan Kumar, Devika, M. N. Nambiar, Nagesh
Ninaipadharku Neramillai	K. C. K.	Saraswathi Productions	K. V. Mahadevan	R. Muthuraman, Sowcar Janaki, Chandrakantha, T. K. Balachandran
Paar Magaley Paar	A. Bhimsingh	Kasthuri Films	Viswanathan–Ramamoorthy	Sivaji Ganesan, Sowcar Janaki, M. R. Radha, C. R. Vijayakumari, R. Muthuraman, Pushpalatha, Cho (debut)
Panathottam	K. Shankar	Saravana Films	Viswanathan–Ramamoorthy	M. G. Ramachandran, B. Saroja Devi, Nagesh
Parisu	D. Yoganand	Gowri Pictures	K. V. Mahadevan	M. G. Ramachandran, Savitri, M. R. Radha
Pen Manam	K. Somu	Mokeshvar Chitra	Veda	A. Nageswara Rao, Anjali Devi, S. Balachander
Periya Idathu Penn	T. R. Ramanna	R. R.Pictures	Viswanathan–Ramamoorthy	M. G. Ramachandran, B. Saroja Devi, M. R. Radha
Punithavathi	M. R. Vittal	C. T. Chettiar	Hussein Reddy	R. S. Manohar, K. Sarangapani, Kaka Radhakrishnan, Pandari Bai, Kamakshi, Chellam
Puratshi Veeran Pulithevan	A. Raja Raman	Sivaji Pictures	K. V. Mahadevan	M. R. Radha, K. A. Thangavelu
Ratha Thilagam	Dada Mirasi	National Movies	K. V. Mahadevan	Sivaji Ganesan, Savitri
Sri Krishnaarjuna Yuddham; Dubbed from Telugu	K. V. Reddy	Jayanthi Pictures	Pendyala Nageswara Rao	N. T. Rama Rao, A. Nageswara Rao, B. Saroja Devi, Kanta Rao, Sriranjani, Chhaya Devi, Dhulipala
Thulasi Maadam	K. B. Srinivasan	M. A. V.Pictures	K. V. Mahadevan	A. V. M. Rajan, 'Gemini' Chandrakantha, Sharada
Vanambadi	G. R. Nathan	Kannadasan Productions	K. V. Mahadevan	S. S. Rajendran, Devika, R. Muthuraman, Pushpalatha, Kamal Haasan
Yarukku Sontham	K. V. Srinivasan	Modern Theatres	K. V. Mahadevan	Kalyan Kumar, Devika, Pushpalatha, Malathi, Rajasree, J. P. Chandrababu, S. V. Subbaiah
