= 16th National Film Awards =

Indian ceremony celebrating cinema of 1968

- 16th National Film Awards
- Awarded for: Best of Indian cinema in 1968
- Presented by: V. V. Giri (President of India)
- Presented on: 13 February 1970
- Site: Vigyan Bhavan, New Delhi
- Official website: dff.nic.in

Highlights
- Best Feature Film: Goopy Gyne Bagha Byne
- Most awards: • Aashirwad • Goopy Gyne Bagha Byne • Kuzhanthaikkaga • Saraswatichandra • Thillaanaa Mohanambal • Thulabharam (2)

The 16th National Film Awards, presented by Ministry of Information and Broadcasting, India to felicitate the best of Indian Cinema released in 1968. Ceremony took place at Vigyan Bhavan, New Delhi on 13 February 1970.

With 16th National Film Awards, three new awards were introduced, mainly for Best Film on Family Welfare, Best Child Artist and Best Film Lyric Writer. Moreover, for male and female singers, awards were differentiated with Best Male Playback Singer and Best Female Playback Singer respectively.

== Juries ==
Six different committees were formed based on the film making sectors in India, mainly based in Bombay, Calcutta and Madras along with the award categories. Another committee for all India level was also formed which included some of the members from regional committee. For 16th National Film Awards, central committee was headed by Justice G. D. Khosla.

- Jury Members: Central
  - G. D. Khosla (Chairperson) • Sitaram Kesri • Sheila Bhatia • A. C. Jalan • Ezra Mir • B. K. Karanjia • Teji Bachchan • I. S. Johar • Haridas Bhattacharjee • U. Visweswar Rao • Sunder Lal Nahata • M. N. Kapur
- Jury Members: Documentary
  - D. K. Borooah (Chairperson) • Shambu Mitra • Mrinalini Sarabhai • G. G. Swell • Shanta Gandhi
- Jury Members: Short Films
  - Piloo Mody (Chairperson) • Balwant Gargi • Amita Malik • R. G. Anand • Inder Lal Das
- Jury Regional: Bombay
  - Nissim Ezekiel (Chairperson) • Urmila Kapur • Navin Khandwalla • R. S. Pande • Firoze Rangoonwalla • Bikram Singh • Bal Chhabda • Shatrujit Paul • Buny Talwar • G. P. Shirke
- Jury Regional: Calcutta
  - Amala Shankar (Chairperson) • Roma Choudhry • Chintamoni Kar • K. C. Panigrahi • A. K. Pramanick • Utpal Dutta • Kanan Devi • Kartic Chatterjee • Durgadas Mitra
- Jury Regional: Madras
  - C. R. Pattabhiraman (Chairperson) • P. Achutha Menon • R. K. Narayan • Mallikarjuna Rao • Sarojini Varadappan • K. Manoharan • Rajammal Anantharaman • V. C. Subburaman • D. V. S. Raju • B. Ananthaswami

== Awards ==
Awards were divided into feature films and non-feature films.

President's Gold Medal for the All India Best Feature Film is now better known as National Film Award for Best Feature Film, whereas President's Gold Medal for the Best Documentary Film is analogous to today's National Film Award for Best Non-Feature Film. For children's films, Prime Minister's Gold Medal is now given as National Film Award for Best Children's Film. At the regional level, President's Silver Medal for Best Feature Film is now given as National Film Award for Best Feature Film in a particular language. Certificate of Merit in all the categories is discontinued over the years.

=== Feature films ===
Feature films were awarded at All India as well as regional level. For 16th National Film Awards, a Bengali film Goopy Gyne Bagha Byne won the President's Gold Medal for the All India Best Feature Film, with also winning the maximum number of awards (two); along with two Hindi films, Aashirwad and Saraswatichandra with a Malayalam film, Thulabharam and a Tamil film, Thillaanaa Mohanambal. Following were the awards given in each category:

==== All India Award ====
Following were the awards given:

Award	Film	Language	Awardee(s)	Cash prize
Best Feature Film	Goopy Gyne Bagha Byne	Bengali	Producer: Nepal Dutta	Gold Medal and ₹20,000
Best Feature Film	Goopy Gyne Bagha Byne	Bengali	Producer: Asim Dutta	Gold Medal and ₹20,000
Best Feature Film	Goopy Gyne Bagha Byne	Bengali	Director: Satyajit Ray	₹5,000 and a plaque
Second Best Feature Film	Thulabharam	Malayalam	Producer: M/s. Supriya Pictures	₹5,000 and a medal
Second Best Feature Film	Thulabharam	Malayalam	Director: A. Vincent	₹2,000 and a plaque
Best Film on Family Welfare	Anchal Ke Phool	Hindi	Producer: M. R. Seth	₹5,000 and a medal
Best Film on Family Welfare	Anchal Ke Phool	Hindi	Director: Karunesh Thakur	₹2,000 and a plaque
Best Feature Film on National Integration	Janmabhoomi	Malayalam	Producer: M/s. Roopa Rekha	₹5,000 and a medal
Best Feature Film on National Integration	Janmabhoomi	Malayalam	Director: John Sankaramangalam	₹2,000 and a plaque
Best Children's Film	Heerer Prajapati	Bengali	Producer: Children's Film Society	₹7,500 and a medal
Best Children's Film	Heerer Prajapati	Bengali	Director: Shanti P. Chowdhury	₹2,500 and a plaque
Best Actor (Bharat Award)	Aashirwad	Hindi	Ashok Kumar	A figurine
Best Actress (Urvashi Award)	Thulabharam	Malayalam	Sharada	A figurine
Best Child Artist	Kuzhanthaikkaga	Tamil	Baby Rani	A plaque
Best Direction	Goopy Gyne Bagha Byne	Bengali	Satyajit Ray	₹ 5,000 and a plaque
Best Music Direction	Saraswatichandra	Hindi	Kalyanji Anandji	₹ 5,000 and a plaque
Best Male Playback Singer	Mere Huzoor (For the song "Jhanak Jhanak Tori Baaje")	Hindi	Manna Dey	A plaque
Best Female Playback Singer	Uyarndha Manithan	Tamil	P. Susheela	A plaque
Lyric Writer of the Best Film Song on National Integration	Kuzhanthaikkaga (For the song "Devan Vanthaan")	Tamil	Kannadasan	A plaque
Best Screenplay	Anokhi Raat	Hindi	Pandit Anand Kumar	₹5,000
Best Cinematography (Black and White)	Saraswatichandra	Hindi	Nariman A. Irani	₹5,000 and a plaque
Best Cinematography (Color)	Thillaanaa Mohanambal	Tamil	K. S. Prasad	₹5,000 and a plaque

==== Regional Award ====
The awards were given to the best films made in the regional languages of India. For feature films in Assamese, English, Gujarati, Kashmiri and Punjabi language, President's Silver Medal for Best Feature Film was not given. The producer and director of the film were awarded with ₹5,000 and a Silver medal, respectively.

Award	Film	Awardee(s)	
Award	Film	Producer	Director
Best Feature Film in Bengali	Apanjan	R. N. Malhotra	Tapan Sinha
Best Feature Film in Bengali	Apanjan	R. K. Kapur	Tapan Sinha
Best Feature Film in Bengali	Apanjan	T. M. Shah	Tapan Sinha
Best Feature Film in Hindi	Aashirwad	N. C. Sippy	Hrishikesh Mukherjee
Best Feature Film in Hindi	Aashirwad	Hrishikesh Mukherjee	Hrishikesh Mukherjee
Best Feature Film in Kannada	Mannina Maga	M. V. Venkatachallam	Geethapriya
Best Feature Film in Kannada	Mannina Maga	P. Alexander	Geethapriya
Best Feature Film in Malayalam	Adhyapika	M/s. Neela Productions	P. Subramaniam
Best Feature Film in Marathi	Ektee	G. Chaugle	Raja Thakur
Best Feature Film in Oriya	Stree	Parbati Ghose	Sidhartha
Best Feature Film in Tamil	Thillaanaa Mohanambal	Vijayalakshmi	A. P. Nagarajan
Best Feature Film in Telugu	Varakatnam	N. Trivikrama Rao	N. T. Rama Rao

=== Non-Feature films ===
Following were the awards given:

==== Short films ====
Award	Film	Language	Awardee(s)	Cash prize
Best Information Film (Documentary)	Everest	English	Producer: Arun Chowdhury for Films Division	₹5,000 and a medal
Best Information Film (Documentary)	Everest	English	Director: N. S. Thapa	₹2,000 and a plaque
Best Educational / Instructional Film	Forest and The Man	English	Producer: K. L. Khandpur for Films Division	₹5,000 and a medal
Best Educational / Instructional Film	Forest and The Man	English	Director: Neil Gokhale	₹2,000 and a plaque
Best Educational / Instructional Film	Forest and The Man	English	Director: P. B. Pendharkar	₹2,000 and a plaque
Best Film on Social Documentation	Water	English	Producer: M/s. Fali Billmoria Productions	₹5,000 and a medal
Best Film on Social Documentation	Water	English	Director: Fali Billmoria	₹2,000 and a plaque
Best Experimental Film	And I Make Short Films	English	Producer: K. L. Khandpur for Films Division	₹5,000 and a medal
Best Experimental Film	And I Make Short Films	English	Director: S. N. S. Sastry	₹2,000 and a plaque
Best Animation Film	Nag Aur Kauwa	Hindi	Producer: Children's Film Society	₹5,000 and a medal
Best Animation Film	Nag Aur Kauwa	Hindi	Director: S. B. Nayampally	₹2,000 and a plaque

=== Awards not given ===
Following were the awards not given as no film was found to be suitable for the award:

- Best Story Writer
- Best Promotional Film
- President's Silver Medal for Best Feature Film in Assamese
- President's Silver Medal for Best Feature Film in English
- President's Silver Medal for Best Feature Film in Punjabi
