= Nenjam Marappathillai =

Nenjam Marappathillai (lit. 'heart never forgets') may refer to:

- Nenjam Marappathillai (1963 film), a 1963 Indian Tamil-language film by C. V. Sridhar
- Nenjam Marappathillai (2021 film), a 2021 Indian Tamil-language film by Selvaraghavan
- Nenjam Marappathillai (TV series), a 2017 Indian television series
