= Baby Rani =

Child actor (b. 1966)

- Born: Rani Rudramma Devi
- Occupation: Actress
- Years active: 1966 - 1982
- Spouse: Samabasiva Rao Rayala
- Children: 3(Two Sons and one Daughter)
- Parent: Shri Sambasiva Rao Stunt Master(telugu) Smt.Sitaravamma

Baby Rani was an Indian child artist, who was active in Tamil Cinema during the latter 20th century. She acted in more than 90 films in Tamil, Telugu, Malayalam, Kannada and Hindi.

== Filmography ==
Year	Film	Role	Language	Notes
1964	Bangaru Thimmaraju		Telugu	
1965	Valkai Padagu		Tamil	
1965	Thodu Needa		Telugu	
1965	Sathee Sakkubai		Telugu	
1966	Chitthi		Tamil	
1966	Ponnu Mappillai		Tamil	
1966	Sangeetha Lakshmi		Telugu	
1966	Letha Manasulu		Telugu	
1967	Aurat		Hindi	
1967	Pesum Dheivam		Tamil	
1967	Pinni		Telugu	
1967	Peddakkaiah		Telugu	
1967	Chikkadu Dorakadu		Telugu	
1967	Bellimoda		Kannada	
1968	Kuzhanthaikkaga	Geetha (First National Award for child is given in India)	Tamil	
1968	Teacharamma		Tamil	
1968	Pappa Kosam		Telugu	
1969	Nanha Farishta	Geetha	Hindi	
1969	Kanne Pappa	Lakshmi	Tamil	
1969	Adimai Penn	Azhagu	Tamil	
1969	Ponnu Mappillai		Tamil	
1969	Thirudan	Lakshmi	Tamil	
1969	Jatakaratna Midathambotlu		Telugu	
1969	Mathru Devatha		Telugu	
1969	Bangaru Panjaram		Telugu	
1969	Adrushtavanthulu		Telugu	
1970	Preethi Magal		Malayalam	
1970	Raman Ethanai Ramanadi	Young Sumathi	Tamil	
1970	Amma Kosam		Telugu	
1970	Pachani Samsaram		Telugu	
1970	Maa Manchi Akkaiah		Telugu	
1970	Pethandarlu		Telugu	
1971	Kasturi Nivasa	Rani	Kannada	
1971	Muthassi		Malayalam	
1971	Aathi Parasakthi	Madurai Meenatchi Amman	Tamil	
1971	Kankatchi		Tamil	
1971	Thirumagal	Neela	Tamil	
1971	Dasara Bullodu		Telugu	
1971	Bhale Papa	Lakshmi	Telugu	
1972	Bhale Rani		Kannada	
1972	Rani Yaar Kuzhanthai	Rani	Tamil	
1972	Appa Tata		Tamil	
1972	Antha Manamanchike		Telugu	
1972	Chitti Thalli		Telugu	
1973	Samsaram Sagaram		Telugu	
1973	Bhakta Tukaram		Telugu	
1974	Premalu Pellillu		Telugu	
1975	Balipeetam		Telugu	
1976	Dasavatharam	Prakalathan	Tamil	
1976	Moondru Mudichu	Prasath Sister	Tamil	
1977	Sri Krishna Leela	Little Krishnan	Tamil	
1978	Kannavari Illu		Telugu	
1982	Bhkta Dhruva Markandeya		Telugu	

== Accolades ==
Year	Film	Category	Outcome	Ref
1968	Kuzhanthaikkaga	National Film Award for Best Child Artist	Won	
1969	Kanne Pappa	Tamil Nadu State Film Award for Best Child Artist	Won	
