= Karpooram =

- Poster
- Directed by: C. N. Shanmugham
- Screenplay by: C. N. Shanmugham
- Produced by: V. T. Arasu
- Starring: A. V. M. Rajan; Pushpalatha
- Cinematography: Vinodhan
- Edited by: Govindaswami
- Music by: D. B. Ramachandra
- Production company: Shashti Films
- Release date: 9 December 1967
- Running time: 170 minutes
- Country: India
- Language: Tamil

Karpooram (transl. Camphor) is a 1967 Indian Tamil-language film directed by C. N. Shanmugham. The film stars A. V. M. Rajan and Pushpalatha. It was released on 9 December 1967, and won the Filmfare Award for Best Tamil Film, while Rajan won the Tamil Nadu State Film Award for Best Actor. The film was an adaptation of stage play of same name.

== Cast ==
- A. V. M. Rajan as Manikkam
- Pushpalatha
- Srikanth as Muthu
- Manimala as Rajathi
- T. P. Muthulakshmi
- T. S. Balaiah
- Cho

== Production ==
Karpooram was directed by C. N. Shanmugham, who also wrote the screenplay. It was produced by V. T. Arasu under Shashti Films. Cinematography was by Vinodhan, and the editing by Govindaswami. The film was an adaptation of stage play of same name. Singaravelan who wrote the original play penned the screenplay and dialogues for the film adaptation. A. V. M. Rajan and Pushpalatha reprise their roles from the play. The film was launched on 7 June 1967 at Vijaya Vauhini Studios with A. L. Srinivasan switching on the camera.

== Soundtrack ==
The soundtrack of the film was composed by D. B. Ramachandra and were lyrics written by Vidwan Ve. Lakshmanan, Mayavanathan & Poovai Senguttuvan.

Song	Singers	Lyrics	Length
"Vanangidum Kaigalin Vadivatthai"	P. Susheela & Soolamangalam Rajalakshmi	Poovai Senguttavan	03:45
"Azhagu Radham Porakkum"	Dharapuram Sundararajan & P. Susheela	Mayavanathan	04:17
"Ammaa Vaenumaa"	L. R. Eswari	Vidwan Ve. Lakshmanan	03:11
"Nilave Unakku Kuraiyedhu"	P. B. Sreenivas & P. Susheela	Vidwan Ve. Lakshmanan	03:09

== Release and reception ==
Karpooram was released on 9 December 1967. Kalki appreciated the film for its dialogues and cast performances. It won the Filmfare Award for Best Tamil Film.
