= Deiveega Uravu =

- VCD cover
- Directed by: Sathyam
- Starring: Jaishankar; Devika
- Music by: K. V. Mahadevan
- Production company: Thirumurugan Pictures
- Release date: 10 May 1968
- Running time: 140 minutes
- Country: India
- Language: Tamil

Deiveega Uravu (transl. Divine Relation) is a 1968 Indian Tamil-language film starring Jaishankar and Devika, with Nagesh, V. K. Ramasamy, Master Sridhar and R. S. Manohar appearing in supporting roles. It was released on 10 May 1968.

== Cast ==
- Jaishankar
- Devika
- Nagesh
- V. K. Ramasamy
- Sachu
- Master Sridhar
- Pakoda Kadhar
- R. S. Manohar
- S. V. Sahasranamam
- Radhika
- Baby Raji
- Thengai Srinivasan (guest role)
- T. P. Muthulakshmi
- S. Rama Rao
- S. V. Subbaiah (guest role)

== Soundtrack ==
The music was composed by K. V. Mahadevan.

Track listing
| No. | Title | Length |
|---|---|---|
| 1. | "Arimugama Naan Puthu Mugama" | 3:29 |
| 2. | "Maram Pazhuthal" | 3:49 |
| 3. | "Chinthama Chirippa" | 3:40 |
| 4. | "Azhagiya Thennam Solai" | 3:55 |
| 5. | "Muthu Nagai Pettagamo" | 3:13 |
| Total length: | | 18:06 |

== Reception ==
Kalki wrote If it's a good story, you can watch it without bothering, but Deiveega Uravu is a hodgepodge panning Devika's character design. It called Nagesh and Ramasamy's humour as the only respite for the audience.
