= Aada Brathuku =

- Theatrical release poster
- Directed by: Vedantam Raghavayya
- Written by: Acharya Aatreya (dialogues)
- Based on: Zindagi (1964)
- Produced by: S. S. Vasan
- Starring: N. T. Rama Rao; Devika
- Cinematography: P. Yellappa
- Edited by: M. Umanatha Rao
- Music by: Viswanathan–Ramamoorthy
- Production company: Gemini Studios
- Release date: 12 November 1965
- Running time: 157 minutes
- Country: India
- Language: Telugu

Aada Brathuku (transl. Women's Life) is a 1965 Indian Telugu-language drama film, produced by S. S. Vasan of Gemini Studios and directed by Vedantam Raghavayya. It stars N. T. Rama Rao, Kantha Rao and Devika (her first appearance in a Telugu Gemini production), with the music composed by the duo Viswanathan–Ramamoorthy (M. S. Viswanathan and T. K. Ramamoorthy). The duo parted ways later, making this their last joint appearance in a Telugu film. The film is a remake of the studio's own Hindi film Zindagi (1964).

== Cast ==
- N. T. Rama Rao as Raja
- Devika as Seeta
- S. V. Ranga Rao as Rao Bahadur Ranganatham
- Kantha Rao as Gopal Rao
- Rajanala as Gangaraju
- Padmanabham as Pasupathi
- Satyanarayana as Jogulu
- Allu Ramalingaiah as Panthulu
- Mukkamala as Sher Khan
- Mahankali Venkaiah as Veerabhadram
- K. V. S. Sarma as Lawyer
- Mikkilineni as Judge
- Geetanjali as Parvathi
- Rushyendramani as Aaya
- Pushpavalli as Ayesha
- M. V. Rajamma as Shanta

== Soundtrack ==
Music composed by the duo Viswanathan–Ramamoorthy.

Song title	Lyrics	Singers	length
"Aaha Andam Chinde"	C. Narayana Reddy	P. B. Srinivas, P. Susheela	4:55
"Kali Muvvalu Ghallumane"	C. Narayana Reddy	Pithapuram, L. R. Eswari	2:30
"Kanulu Palakarinchenu"	C. Narayana Reddy	P. B. Srinivas	4:02
"Piliche Naamadilo"	C. Narayana Reddy	P. Susheela	3:21
"Vishaminchina"	C. Narayana Reddy	P. Susheela	2:14
"Bujji Bujji Papayi"	Acharya Aatreya	P. B. Srinivas	3:31
"Niya Sumangali Nee Vamma"	C. Narayana Reddy	P. Susheela	3:07
"Vasthade Vasthade Vanne"	C. Narayana Reddy	P. Susheela	1:57
"Thanuvukenni Gayalaina"	Acharya Aatreya	P. B. Srinivas	3:17
