= Vaazhkai Padagu =

- Theatrical release poster
- Directed by: C. Srinivasan
- Screenplay by: Veppathur Kittu
- Based on: Zindagi
- Produced by: S. S. Vasan
- Starring: Gemini Ganesan; Devika; R. Muthuraman
- Cinematography: P. Ellappa
- Edited by: J. Balakrishnan
- Music by: Viswanathan–Ramamoorthy
- Production company: Gemini Studios
- Release date: 26 March 1965
- Running time: 166 minutes
- Country: India
- Language: Tamil

Vaazhkai Padagu (transl. The Boat of Life) is a 1965 Indian Tamil-language drama film, directed by C. Srinivasan and produced by S. S. Vasan under Gemini Studios. The film stars Gemini Ganesan, Devika and R. Muthuraman, with S. V. Ranga Rao, K. Balaji R. S. Manohar and M. V. Rajamma in supporting roles. A remake of the studio's own Hindi film Zindagi (1964), it was released on 26 March 1965.

== Plot ==
A young, unemployed woman Seetha takes up stage acting as a career. A wealthy man Kannabiran is after her, and uses his henchman to kidnap her. During the attempt, Rajan and his dog rescue her and the two fall in love. Rajan is the son of a zamindar, who has a poor opinion of Seetha. However, after many hurdles, the two marry. The director of Seetha's stage troupe Gopal too is in love with her. But, she never responds. When Kannabiran is murdered. Gopal is arrested. He has an alibi – on the night of the murder, a young woman stayed with him in his house, but then he does not disclose her identity. The woman turns out to be Seetha and she gives them the evidence. One of the members of the jury is her father-in-law and complications follow with the husband leaving her and wishing to marry again. However, the truth comes out and the family is united in the end.

== Cast ==
Male

- Gemini Ganesan as Rajan
- Muthuraman as Gopal
- S. V. Ranga Rao as Rajan's father
- Nagesh
- T. S. Balaiah
- Manohar as Kannabiran's henchman
- Balaji as Kannabiran
- S. Rama Rao
- P. D. Sambandam
- Baby Farida
- Master Saheeth
- Honey

Female

- Devika as Seetha
- M. V. Rajamma
- Pushpavalli
- S. N. Lakshmi
- Geetanjali

== Production ==
Vaazhkai Padagu is the Tamil remake of Gemini Studios's own Hindi film Zindagi (1964). It was Devika's first film with the studio.

== Soundtrack ==
Music was by Viswanathan–Ramamoorthy and were lyrics written by Kannadasan.

Songs	Singer	Length
"Aayiram Penmai Malaratume"	P. Susheela	05:24
"Netru Varai Nee Yaaro"	P. B. Srinivas	03:56
"Unnai Thaane Naan Ariven"	P. Susheela	03:43
"Chinna Chinna Kannanukku"	P. B. Srinivas	03:34
"Pazhani Santhana Vaadai"	Sirkazhi Govindarajan L. R. Eswari	03:08
"Thanga Magal"	P. Susheela	03:17
"Kangale Kangale"	P. B. Srinivas	03:22

== Release and reception ==
Vaazhkai Padagu was released on 26 March 1965, and emerged a box office success. It was the first film to be released at the theatre Nataraj, which opened on the same day. The magazines Kumudam and Ananda Vikatan wrote positive reviews, primarily praising Devika's performance. Kalki magazine also praised the performances of actors.
