= Neela Vaanam =

1965 film by P. Madhavan

- Theatrical release poster
- Directed by: P. Madhavan
- Screenplay by: K. Balachander
- Produced by: Varathan
- Starring: Sivaji Ganesan; Devika; Rajasri
- Cinematography: M. Karnan
- Edited by: R. Devarajan
- Music by: M. S. Viswanathan
- Production company: Pattu Films
- Distributed by: Sivaji Films
- Release date: 10 December 1965
- Country: India
- Language: Tamil

Neela Vaanam (transl. Blue Sky) is a 1965 Indian Tamil-language film, directed by P. Madhavan and produced by Varathan. The film stars Sivaji Ganesan, Devika and Rajasri. It was released on 10 December 1965.

== Plot ==
Babu, a Bachelor of Arts graduate working as a ticket taker at Shanthi Theatre, often hitchhikes to work. During one such ride, he meets Vimala, and the two gradually fall in love. Babu tells her he will marry only after securing a better job. Vimala’s uncle Varatharajan later comes to approve of their relationship.

Meanwhile, Somanathan, a wealthy paper mill owner, seeks a groom for his daughter Gowri. By chance, Gowri meets Babu and offers him a job at her father’s mill. After Babu is publicly humiliated at Gowri’s birthday party over a missing necklace, Somanathan intervenes, apologizes, and formally employs him.

Vimala introduces Babu to her family, but events take a tragic turn when Gowri is diagnosed with incurable uterine cancer, a fact her parents conceal from her. After a proposed marriage alliance for Gowri collapses, she grows closer to Babu and proposes to him. Aware of his daughter’s limited time, Somanathan pleads with Babu to marry her, and Babu reluctantly agrees.

After the marriage, Vimala believes Babu abandoned her for wealth. She later joins the paper mill as Gowri’s assistant, creating tension. To protect Gowri from despair, Babu and Somanathan pretend she is pregnant, allowing her to live happily in her final months. Babu secretly searches for a cure for Gowri's cancer but fails.

Eventually, Gowri learns of both her illness and Babu’s past relationship with Vimala. Accepting her fate, she urges Babu to marry Vimala and dies in his arms. Devastated, Babu leaves the house carrying a doll Gowri cherished as their child. Vimala later finds him and pleads for his understanding, but Babu silently walks away.

== Cast ==
- Sivaji Ganesan as Babu
- Devika as Gowri
- Rajasri as Vimala
- S. V. Sahasranamam as Somanathan: Gowri's father
- V. K. Ramasamy as Varatharajan: Vimala's father
- Nagesh as Prakash: Varatharajan's brother-in-law
- Seethalakshmi as Kamala
- Kumari Padmini as Thilagam: Gowri's friend
- I. S. R as Balraj: Thilagam's husband
- Harikrishnan as Sharma
- Comedy Shanmugam as Babu's friend
- Loose Aarumugam as Guest appearance
- Pakoda Kadhar as Play Boy
- Karuppu Subbiah as Babu House Owner

== Soundtrack ==
The music was composed by M. S. Viswanathan and the lyrics were penned by Kannadasan. The song "Sollada Vaai Thirandhu" is set in Senjurutti raga.

Song	Singer/s	Duration
"O Lakshmi, O Sheela, O Maalaa"	L. R. Eswari	02:78
"O Little Flower, See Your Lover"	T. M. Soundararajan	03:20
"Oho Ho Odum Ennangale"	P. Susheela	03:41
"Mangala Mangaiyum Maappillaiyum"	P. Susheela, L. R. Eswari	04:10
"Solladaa Vaay Thirandhu Ammaavenru"	P. Susheela	03:14

== Release and reception ==
Neela Vaanam was released on 10 December 1965, and distributed by Sivaji Films. T. M. Ramachandran of Sport and Pastime called it a "poor film" and criticised Madhavan's direction as "naive". He also noted "There is nothing much to write home about K. Balachander's screenplay and dialogue" but called Viswanathan's music "pleasing". Kalki appreciated Balachander's screenplay and dialogue but criticised the songs.
