= Zindagi (1964 film) =

- Directed by: Ramanand Sagar
- Produced by: Gemini Pictures
- Starring: Prithviraj Kapoor; Rajendra Kumar; Vyjayanthimala; Raaj Kumar
- Music by: Shankar Jaikishan
- Distributed by: Gemini Pictures
- Release date: 1964
- Country: India
- Language: Hindi

Zindagi (transl. Life) is a 1964 Indian Hindi-language film produced by S. S. Vasan, Gemini Pictures and directed by Ramanand Sagar. The film stars Rajendra Kumar, Vyjayanthimala, Raaj Kumar, Prithviraj Kapoor, Mehmood, Jayant, Jeevan, Leela Chitnis and Helen. The film's music is by Shankar Jaikishan. The film was remade in Tamil as Vaazhkai Padagu (1965) and in Telugu as Aada Brathuku (1965).

== Plot ==
Beena works as a stage actress and lives a poor lifestyle with her widowed mother. One day while returning home, she is molested by Banke and two other men, but Rajan comes to her rescue. He escorts her home and soon both of them fall in love with each other. Rajan's father, Rai Bahadur Gangasaran, is wealthy and does not approve of Beena at all. But when Rajan threatens to leave him, he changes his mind and permits them to get married. After the marriage, they settle down to a harmonious life and soon Beena becomes pregnant. One night while driving, Rajan gets a flat tire, he leaves Beena in the car in order to get help. When he returns Beena has disappeared. She returns home the next day, and everyone is relieved to have her back. A few days later, they get the news that Gopal, the Manager of the Theatre that Beena used to work with, has been arrested and charged with killing a man named Ratanlal. Gangasaran is on the jury and would like Gopal to get a fair trial. The police find out that a woman was present with Gopal at the night of the murder, but Gopal refuses to divulge her name. As a result of this refusal, he is found guilty. When the sentence is about to be passed, Beena suddenly appears in Court and testifies that she was with Gopal the night of the murder. Gopal is set free, but Beena is shunned by Rajan and Gangasaran and not only driven out of the house, but also from the town. The question does remain - what compelled Beena to spend the night with Gopal, and why was Gopal accused of killing Ratanlal?

== Cast ==
- Rajendra Kumar as Rajendra "Rajan"
- Vyjayanthimala as Beena
- Raaj Kumar as Gopal
- Prithviraj Kapoor as Rai Bahadur Gangasaran
- Mehmood as Jaggu
- Helen as Chameli
- Jayant as Sher Khan
- Jeevan as Banke
- Kanhaiyalal as Pandit
- Dhumal as Chameli's Father
- Leela Chitnis as Beena's Mother
- Mumtaz Begum as Jaggu's Mother
- Pushpavalli
- Baby Farida

== Soundtrack ==
| Song | Singer |
|---|---|
| "Pehle Mile The Sapnon Mein" | Mohammed Rafi |
| "Humne Jafa Na Seekhi" | Mohammed Rafi |
| "Ghungharwa Mora Chham Chham Baje" | Mohammed Rafi, Asha Bhosle |
| "Aaj Bhagwan Ke Charanon Mein Jhukakar Sar Ko" | Mohammed Rafi, Asha Bhosle |
| "Chhune Na Dungi Main Hath Re" | Lata Mangeshkar, Asha Bhosle |
| "Hum Pyar Ka Sauda" (Happy) | Lata Mangeshkar |
| "Hum Pyar Ka Sauda" (Sad) | Lata Mangeshkar |
| "Hum Dil Ka Kanwal Denge" | Lata Mangeshkar |
| "Ek Naye Mehman Ke" | Lata Mangeshkar |
| "Pyar Ki Dulhan Sada Suhagan" | Lata Mangeshkar |
| "Muskura Laadle Muskura" | Manna Dey |
