= Ponnu Mappillai =

- Poster
- Directed by: S. Ramanathan
- Written by: 'Usilai' T. Somanathan
- Produced by: P. S. Veerappa; P. S. V. Hariharan
- Starring: Jaishankar; Kanchana
- Cinematography: P. Bhaskar Rao; A. Venkat
- Edited by: A. Paul Durai Singam
- Music by: Vedha
- Production company: P. S. V. Pictures
- Distributed by: Veerakumar Movies
- Release date: 26 September 1969
- Country: India
- Language: Tamil

Ponnu Mappillai (transl. Bride and Bridegroom) is a 1969 Indian Tamil-language crime thriller film directed by S. Ramanathan and written by 'Usilai' T. Somanathan. The film stars Jaishankar and Kanchana. It was released on 26 September 1969.

== Plot ==
The film opens with a smuggler getting down from a plane at Madras airport. He comes out of the airport and places a guitar inside a car. The passenger in the car is a masked man who opens a secret compartment in the guitar to find a pouch with many diamonds. The masked man notices that he is being pursued by a police car. He stops the car in front of a shop and places the guitar inside another car parked in front of the shop and hides in a nearby place. The car belongs to a couple Ramesh and Bhuvana who have entered the shop. Meanwhile a bystander notices the guitar and takes it out of the car. The couple comes out of the shop and drive away. The masked man notes down the car number so that he can track down the diamonds. The rest of the film is about how the guitar changes many hands and Ramesh tackles the smugglers.

== Cast ==
- Jaishankar as Ramesh
- Kanchana as Bhuvana Ramesh
- P. S. Veerappa as Dharmaprakash
- Nagesh as Sedhu
- A. Veerappan as Madhu
- V. K. Ramasamy as Egambaram
- Manorama as Saraswathi (Egambaram Second Wife)
- C. L. Anandan as Dharmaprakash's henchman
- A. Karunanidhi as Thazhamuthu
- Pakoda Kadhar as Krishna Egambaram
- B. V. Radha as Mad girl
- Renuka as Owner's daughter
- Typist Gopu as Thazhamuthu's sidekick
- Usilai Mani as Train passenger
- Baby Rani
- Tambaram Lalitha as Kannamma
- Kambar Jayaraman as Neighbor
- S. Rama Rao as Thangamuthu
- K. Vijayan as Inspector
- Angamuthu as Amsavalli

== Production ==
The filming began in 1967.

== Soundtrack ==
Music composed by Vedha. Lyrics were written by Kannadasan & Thanjai Vanan.

Song title	Singers	Length
"Ellorum Kai Thattungal"	L. R. Eswari	04:10
"Manamagan Azhagane"	A. L. Raghavan	3:10
"Naalaa Naalaa Palanaalaa"	T. M. Soundararajan & P. Susheela	04:20
"Sirittha Mugam Sivandhadhenna"	T. M. Soundararajan & P. Susheela	04:28

== Reception ==
The Indian Express wrote, "The script is very intelligent and that is the first thing. The credit goes to Usili Somanathan. [..] the credit goes to the director S. Ramanathan who handles the script sensitively and intelligently".
