= Veettukku Veedu Vasappadi =

- Poster
- Directed by: P. Madhavan
- Written by: Mouli (dialogues)
- Story by: Navatha Arts
- Starring: Vijayakumar; Suman; Shoba; Rati
- Cinematography: A. Somasundaram
- Edited by: R. Devarajan
- Music by: Rajan–Nagendra
- Production company: Arun Prasad Movies
- Release date: 16 November 1979
- Country: India
- Language: Tamil

Veettukku Veedu Vasappadi (transl. Every house has a doorstep) is a 1979 Indian Tamil-language drama film directed by P. Madhavan. The film stars Vijayakumar, Suman, Shoba and Rati Agnihotri in lead roles. The soundtrack was composed by Rajan–Nagendra. The film was released on 16 November 1979. It is a remake of the 1979 Telugu film Intinti Ramayanam.

== Cast ==
- Vijayakumar as Jagan
- Suman as Mohan
- Shoba as Latha
- Rati as Jaya
- Suruli Rajan
- Manorama as Panchali
- Nagesh as Latha's father
- Major Sundarrajan
- Pushpalatha as Latha's mother
- Peeli Sivam
- Kathadi Ramamurthy

== Soundtrack ==
The soundtrack was composed by Rajan–Nagendra and lyrics were written by Kannadasan.

Track listing
No.	Title	Singer(s)	Length
1.	"Veettukku Veedu"	S. P. Balasubrahmanyam, P. Susheela
2.	"Aadal Paadal"	S. Janaki
3.	"Patta Kashtam"	S. Janaki
4.	"Thogai Kannil"	S. P. Balasubrahmanyam, S. Janaki

== Release and reception ==
Veettukku Veedu Vasappadi was released on 16 November 1979. Naagai Dharuman of Anna praised the acting of the cast, Mouli's dialogues, Somasundaram's dialogues, Rajan–Nagendra's music and Madhavan's direction. Kausikan of Kalki praised the acting of Vijayakumar, Suman, Shoba but panned the acting of Rati Agnihotri. He praised Soman's cinematography and Madhavan's direction.
