= Kuzhanthaikkaga =

- Theatrical poster
- Directed by: P. Madhavan
- Screenplay by: Thuraiyur Moorthy
- Produced by: D. Ramanaidu
- Starring: Padmini; R. S. Manohar; Major Sundarrajan; S. V. Ramadas; Baby Rani
- Cinematography: P. N. Sundaram
- Edited by: K. A. Marthaand
- Music by: M. S. Viswanathan
- Production company: Vijaya–Suresh Combines
- Distributed by: Chinni Films
- Release date: 12 June 1968
- Running time: 148 minutes
- Country: India
- Language: Tamil

Kuzhanthaikkaga (transl. For the Child's Sake) is a 1968 Indian Tamil-language crime drama film directed by P. Madhavan, produced by D. Ramanaidu and written by Thuraiyur K. Moorthi, with music by M. S. Viswanathan. The film stars Padmini, R. S. Manohar, Major Sundarrajan, S. V. Ramadas and Baby Rani. It is a remake of the Telugu film Papa Kosam (1968). The film was released on 12 June 1968.

== Plot ==
A great train robbery takes place near Chennai and three robbers Jambu (a Hindu), Joseph (a Christian) and Naseer (a Muslim) steal the jewels of the passengers at gunpoint. They continue stealing from various shops and hotels; their atrocities become the talk of the city. The three enter a rich man Prabhakar's house, kill everybody and steal the money. They see a young child Geetha there and Jambu starts to like her. The other two do not show any affection, but Jambu decides to take her along as they escape before the police arrive. The police learn that all the robberies and the killings were carried out by the same set of robbers and announce a reward of ₹10,000 (equivalent to ₹520,000 or US$5,400 in 2023) for anyone who can help nab them.

At their hideout, Jambu gets attached to the child, whilst the other two believe the child has come to kill them. But the child, through her loving attitude and respect for their religions, makes the other two also like her. Now, all three believe that the child is God like and give her all the affection they can. Their problem begins when the child does not eat and demands her aaya (maid) feed her. They try, but the child cries for Aaya Gowri. Left with no choice, Jambu travels to bring her. A police inspector investigating the case asks Gowri why she, who usually spent every night with the child, left her alone that specific night. They suspect her of helping the robbers and take her into custody. Jambu learns Gowri's address from the two fellow passengers. He meets Gowri's mother as her brother Manickam, convinces everyone that he is their close relative including the police officers and then takes Gowri with him forcefully, jumps off the train and escapes from the police.

Gowri is happy to see the child, but is shaken about being with the robbers who killed her master. She takes care of the child and also cooks for and attends to the three robbers. She tries to kill them by mixing poison with milk, but they find that out and beat her. She then plans to split them and escape with the child. She tries entice them and Joseph and Naseer fall for it. But Jambu understands her game and puts sense into the other two. Her plan fails again. The three decide that Gowri should be out of the life of the child. So they demand her to behave in a manner that the child shall hate her. She does not agree because she has brought up the child. Jambu gets more attached to the child and it is mutual. He starts believing that the child will live without Gowri and decides to kill her. Gowri overhears this and escapes with the child. However, they soon find out and chase her. The child starts shouting and to make her silent, Gowri shuts her mouth which leads to her wheezing and a heart problem. They catch them and she asks for their help to bring Dr. Ramanathan, who knows the child's health condition. Joseph goes in the disguise of sardar and visits Ramanathan who is at a wedding and convinces him to come with him. The police, who were at the marriage venue find it fishy and follow their car. The police try to shoot and stop them, but Joseph somehow escapes with the doctor.

Joseph and the doctor reach their hideout and Ramanathan understands the dire situation. He attends to the child and stops treating her saying that the child will die anyway. The three beat him, but he refuses to treat the child and says that they will become the reason for the death of the child. The three get emotionally disturbed and beg for his help. He puts up a demand that he will attend to the child only if they agree to surrender to the police for their crimes. The three express their fear of losing the love of the child if they surrender. For this, Ramanathan assures that he will fight for them in the court and also ensure that the child comes and meets them every day. The three agree to surrender and Ramanathan attends to the child. Naseer goes to the city to get medicine. The shopkeeper informs the police and they arrive to catch him, but he escapes. Ramanathan treats the child and the three pray for her recovery. Finally, the child recovers and asks for the three uncles instead of Gowri. The three get attached to the child and decide to leave all their wealth behind and move away with her. They get surrounded by a large number of police. The three attack the police courageously. Ramanathan and Gowri manage to escape with the child. Joseph is injured and when they realise that the child has been taken away, they decide to escape somewhere in order to get her back. They manage to escape and hide and police are unable to trace them. Ramanathan convinces the police about the love the three have for the child. The police assure that the child can meet them in jail and also not to shoot them when they surrender. Ramanathan now asks the child to speak in the mike and the child calls for the three uncles. They hear her and surrender to the police. Ramanathan assures to take care of the child and bring her to meet them regularly. The three are arrested by the police and the child follows calling them out.

== Cast ==
- Padmini as Gowri
- R. S. Manohar as Joseph
- Major Sundarrajan as Jambu
- S. V. Ramadas as Naseer
- Baby Rani as Pappa (Geetha)
- T. K. Bhagavathi as Dr. Ramanathan
- K. A. Thangavelu as Nachimuthu
- Thengai Srinivasan as Constable
- A. Karunanidhi as Singamuthu
- Jambu as Sub-inspector
- S. A. Ashokan as Inspector
- S. V. Sahasranamam as Commissioner
- Krishna as Prabhakar
- Cho as Astrologer
- Pandari Bai as Gowri's mother
- Manorama as Constable's wife
- Vennira Aadai Nirmala as Prabhakar's partner

== Soundtrack ==
Music was by M. S. Viswanathan and lyrics were by Kannadasan. The song "Thai Maadha Megam" is set in Yamunakalyani raga.

Song	Singer	Length
"Raman Enbathu" (Devan Vanthan)	T. M. Soundararajan, Sirkazhi Govindarajan & P. B. Srinivas	04:25
"Thai Maatha Megam"	P. Susheela	05:03
"Thottu Paarungal"	P. Susheela	04:12
"Thai Maatha Megam" – 2	Tharapuram Soundararajan, A. Veeramani & P. Susheela	

== Release and reception ==
The film was critically well received and ran for over 100 days in theatres. At the 16th National Film Awards, Kannadasan won the first ever award for Best Lyrics, and Baby Rani won for Best Child Artist. At the Tamil Nadu State Film Awards, P. N. Sundaram won for Best Cinematographer.

== Bibliography ==
- Dhananjayan, G. (2014). Pride of Tamil Cinema: 1931–2013. Blue Ocean Publishers. OCLC 898765509.
