= Pushpalatha =

Indian actress (1937 or 1938 – 2025)

- Born: 1937 or 1938; Mettupalayam, Madras Province, British India
- Died: 4 February 2025 (aged 87); Chennai, Tamil Nadu, India
- Occupation: Actress
- Years active: 1955–1990
- Notable work: Sarada (1962); Paar Magaley Paar (1963); Naanum Oru Penn (1963); Karpooram (1967)
- Spouse: A. V. M. Rajan (m. 1964)
- Children: 2, including Mahalakshmi

Pushpalatha (1937 or 1938 – 4 February 2025) was an Indian actress, who worked predominantly in Tamil-, Telugu-, Kannada- and Malayalam-language films. She acted in lead and character roles in more than 100 films. Her debut film was Sengottai Singam, released in 1958. When Pushpalatha co-starred with A. V. M. Rajan in Naanum Oru Penn, the two fell in love and got married. In 1964, she was a model for Lux soap.

== Early career ==
Pushpalatha's native home was Mettupalayam, Coimbatore. Her father sold brass and silver. She was the fifth child among the 8 children of a strict Chettinadu Catholic family. She completed Bharatnatyam at the age of 9. In 1955, she had a cameo role in the movie Nalla Thangai, produced and directed by actor S. A. Natarajan.

== Film career ==
She made her debut in the movie Konga Nattu Thangam (1962). Following that, she has acted as lead actress and supporting actress in more than one hundred films, such as Sarada, Paar Magaley Paar, Naanum Oru Penn, Yarukku Sontham, Thaaye Unakkaga, Karpooram, Jeevanaamsam, Dharisanam, Kalyanaraman, Sakalakalla Vallavan, Simla Special, Puthu Vellam and Ammavum Neeye Appavum Neeye. She has acted in several Telugu and Malayalam films. Pushpalatha produced two films. Both of them failed at the box office.

== Personal life and death ==
AVM Rajan and Pushpalatha were one of the popular star couples in Tamil cinema. Pushpalatha was a Christian, while AVM Rajan was at the time a fervent Hindu devoted to Lord Muruga. Pushpalatha produced two films, both of which failed commercially. Pushpalatha financially suffered for that reason. The couple had two daughters, one of whom is Mahalakshmi, also an actress. Their family has converted to Christianity, doing fulltime ministry today.

Pushpalatha died on 4 February 2025, at the age of 87.

== Partial filmography ==
=== 1950s ===
List of Pushpalatha's 1950s film credits
| Year | Title | Role | Notes |
|---|---|---|---|
| 1955 | Cherapakura Chedevu | Savitri | Debut in Telugu |
| 1955 | Aada Bidda | | Telugu |
| 1958 | Sengottai Singam | | |

=== 1960s ===
List of Pushpalatha's 1960s film credits
| Year | Title | Role | Notes |
|---|---|---|---|
| 1961 | Kongunattu Thangam | Thangam | Debut Film |
| 1961 | Panam Panthiyile | | |
| 1962 | Sarada | Uma | |
| 1962 | Sengamala Theevu | | |
| 1962 | Policekaran Magal | Mallika | |
| 1962 | Aalayamani | Parvathi | |
| 1962 | Kavitha | | |
| 1963 | Paar Magaley Paar | Kaantha | |
| 1963 | Mani Osai | | |
| 1963 | Naanum Oru Penn | | |
| 1963 | Yarukku Sontham | | |
| 1963 | Vanampadi | Kalyani (Nithyanandham's wife) | |
| 1963 | Kattu Roja | Pushpa | |
| 1963 | Ezhai Pangalan | | |
| 1963 | Neengadha Ninaivu | | |
| 1963 | Ratha Thilagam | | |
| 1963 | Main Bhi Ladki Hoon | | Hindi |
| 1964 | Pachai Vilakku | Latha | |
| 1964 | Aandavan Kattalai | Gomathi | |
| 1964 | Chitrangi | | |
| 1964 | Nalvaravu | | |
| 1964 | Maganey Kel | | |
| 1964 | Kai Koduttha Dheivam | Sakunthala | |
| 1964 | Alli | | |
| 1966 | Ramu | Seetha | |
| 1965 | Pazhani | Emily | |
| 1966 | Thaaye Unakkaga | Radha | |
| 1967 | Karpooram | | |
| 1967 | Raja Veetu Pillai | Geetha | |
| 1968 | Jeevanaamsam | | |
| 1968 | Panama Pasama | | |
| 1969 | Chellapen | | |
| 1969 | Magizhampoo | | |
| 1969 | Paal Kudam | | |
| 1969 | Nurse | | Malayalam |
| 1969 | Subadhinam | | |

=== 1970s ===
List of Pushpalatha's 1970s film credits
| Year | Title | Role | Notes |
|---|---|---|---|
| 1970 | Dharisanam | | |
| 1971 | Prema Nagar | | Telugu film |
| 1970 | Engal Thangam | Sumathi | |
| 1972 | Vasantha Maligai | Anand's guardian | |
| 1973 | Rajaraja Cholan | Sathyasiriyan wife | |
| 1973 | Rajapart Rangadurai | | |
| 1974 | Dheerga Sumangali | Pankajam | |
| 1974 | Thirumalai Deivam | | |
| 1974 | Eradu Kanasu | | Kannada film |
| 1974 | Urimaikural | Muthamma | |
| 1974 | Avalukku Nigar Avale | Kalyani | |
| 1974 | Prem Nagar | | Hindi film (remake of Prema Nagar) |
| 1974 | Vandhaale Magaraasi | Uma (Sivalingam Daughter) | |
| 1975 | Puthu Vellam | | |
| 1975 | Annadammula Anubandham | | |
| 1976 | Needhikku Thalaivanangu | Seetha | |
| 1976 | Muthana Muthallavo | | |
| 1977 | Navarathinam | | |
| 1978 | Chittukkuruvi | | |
| 1978 | Sattam En Kaiyil | Lakshmi | |
| 1978 | Aayiram Jenmangal | Radha's mother | |
| 1978 | Athaivida Ragasiyam | | |
| 1979 | Nadagame Ulagam | | |
| 1979 | Pagalil Oru Iravu | | |
| 1979 | Kandar Alangaram | | |
| 1979 | Pattakkathi Bhairavan | | |
| 1979 | Vetrikku Oruvan | | |
| 1979 | Dharma Yuddham | Chitra's mother | |
| 1979 | Kalyanaraman | Rajalakshmi | |
| 1979 | Maa Voollo Mahasivudu | Bhagyam | Telugu |
| 1979 | Vetagadu | Gãyathri | Telugu |
| 1979 | Nadagame Ulagam | | |
| 1979 | Veettukku Veedu Vasappadi | Latha's mother | |

=== 1980s ===
List of Pushpalatha's 1980s film credits
| Year | Title | Role | Notes | |
|---|---|---|---|---|
| 1980 | Anna Paravai | | | |
| 1980 | Aatagadu | | Telugu | |
| 1980 | Naan Kudithukonde Iruppen | | | |
| 1980 | Gharana Donga | Parvathi, Krishna's mother | Telugu | |
| 1980 | Rakta Bandham | | Telugu | |
| 1980 | Soolam | | | |
| 1980 | Yamanukku Yaman | Savithiri Mother | | |
| 1980 | Dharma Raja | | | |
| 1980 | Natchathiram | | | |
| 1980 | Ratha Paasam | | | |
| 1981 | Hennina Sedu | | Kannada | |
| 1981 | Premabhishekam | Lakshmi | Telugu | Original of Vazhvey Mayam |
| 1981 | Pennin Vazhkai | Prabhu's Mother | | |
| 1981 | Kondaveeti Simham | | Telugu | |
| 1982 | Simla Special | Gopu's Mother | | |
| 1982 | Krishnarjunulu | | Telugu | |
| 1982 | Devatha | | Telugu | |
| 1982 | Iddaru Kodukulu | Lakshmi | Telugu | |
| 1982 | Pratigna | Parvathy | Telugu | |
| 1982 | Sakalakala Vallavan | Parvathi | | |
| 1982 | Pralaya Rudrudu | Inspector Vijay and Murali's mother | Telugu | |
| 1983 | Puli Bebbuli | | Telugu | |
| 1983 | Moogavani Paga | Seetha | Telugu | |
| 1983 | Prema Pichollu | | Telugu | |
| 1983 | Dowry Kalyanam | Rushyendramani | | |
| 1983 | Ilaiya Piravigal | Parvathyi | | |
| 1984 | Uravai Kaatha Kili | | | |
| 1984 | Olave Baduku | | Kannada | |
| 1984 | Oorukku Upadesam | Kausalya | | |
| 1984 | Nilavu Suduvathillai | | | |
| 1984 | Ninaivugal | | | |
| 1985 | Deivapiravi | | | |
| 1985 | Ammavum Neeye Appavum Neeye | | | |
| 1986 | Naan Adimai Illai | Nanny | | |
| 1986 | Vikram | | Telugu | |
| 1986 | Mamiyargal Jakkirathai | | | |
| 1986 | Ukku Manishi | | Telugu | |
| 1987 | Jeevana Jyothi | Lady running guest house | Kannada | |
| 1987 | Daada | | Telugu | |
| 1988 | Veedu Manaivi Makkal | Jagadamba | | |
| 1999 | Poo Vaasam | | | Delayed released |
