= Annai Illam =

- Theatrical release poster
- Directed by: P. Madhavan
- Screenplay by: G. Balasubramaniam
- Story by: Dada Mirasi
- Produced by: M. R. Santhanam
- Starring: Sivaji Ganesan; Devika
- Cinematography: P. N. Sundaram
- Edited by: N. M. Shankar
- Music by: K. V. Mahadevan
- Production company: Kamala Pictures
- Distributed by: Sivaji Productions
- Release date: 15 November 1963
- Running time: 147 minutes
- Country: India
- Language: Tamil

Annai Illam (transl. Mother's home) is a 1963 Indian Tamil-language drama film, directed by P. Madhavan and produced by M. R. Santhanam. The film stars Sivaji Ganesan and Devika. It was released on 15 November 1963, and ran for 100 days in theatres.

== Plot ==
Paramasivam, his pregnant wife Gowri, and their first son Kumaresan live a lavish and charitable life. They fall into abject poverty due to their charitable nature. At one instance, desperately in need of money to help his wife's childbirth, Paramasivam goes to borrow money but ends up assaulting the shopkeeper in anger after he insults him. Believing him to be dead and himself to be a murderer, he abandons his family and runs away with his son to be rescued by Rathnam, a friend.

Rathnam takes him to the city and lies to him that his wife and child died in childbirth and the police were looking for him causing him to change his name to Paramanandam. He uses Paramandandam's innate goodness and charitable as well as trustworthy nature to front him to the society for his smuggling business in which he prospers with his assistant Manickam. Adult Kumar falls in love with Public Prosecutor Ramanathan's daughter where Shanmugam, his brother works. They all meet each other without realizing they are related.

As fate would have it, Kumar finds that his father is a smuggler which causes Paramanandam to come clean. Fearing exposure, Rathnam, with Manickam's help, frames Paramanandam for all the crimes including a murder of a constable he committed and sends him to gallows. Kumar struggles to rescue his father but Shanmugan, now the public prosecutor takes up the case in front of judge Ramanathan close the noose on the face of evidence. Rathnam also betrays Manickam so as to leave no loose ends. In the end, Kumar manages to goad Rathnam into a confession, which is secretly witnessed by Ramanthan and cops along with Manickam turning approver and sets his father free.

== Cast ==
- Sivaji Ganesan as Kumar/Kumaresan
- Devika as Geetha
- S. V. Ranga Rao as Paramanandam/Paramasivam
- M. V. Rajamma as Gowri
- M. N. Nambiar as Rathnam
- R. Muthuraman as Shanmugam
- V. K. Ramasamy as Ramanathan
- M. S. Sundari Bai as Gomathi
- Nagesh as Godhandam
- Jayanthi as Raji
- Sachu as Seetha
- K. K. Soundar as Police inspector
- O. A. K. Thevar as Manickam
- S. A. Kannan as Kannan

== Production ==
Ganesan recommended Madhavan as the director to Santhanam. The dialogues were written by Aaroor Dass. The song "Sigappu Vilakku" was filmed at the Life Insurance Corporation building in Madras.

== Soundtrack ==
The music was composed by K. V. Mahadevan, with lyrics by Kannadasan. The song "Madi Meethu" is set in Bageshri raga.

Track listing
No.	Title	Singer(s)	Length
1.	"Ennirandu 16 Vayathu"	T. M. Soundararajan, Humming L. R. Eswari	3:37
2.	"Madi Meethu"	T. M. Soundararajan, P. Susheela	4:17
3.	"Nadaiya Idhu Nadaiya"	T. M. Soundararajan	3:09
4.	"Enna Illai"	A. L. Raghavan	2:57
5.	"Sigappu Vilakku"	T. M. Soundararajan, P. Susheela	3:13
Total length:			17:13

== Release and reception ==
Annai Illam was released on 15 November 1963, and distributed by Sivaji Productions. It was previously scheduled for July 1963. Writing for Sport and Pastime, T. M. Ramachandran said, "The conventional and even illogical manner in which the story has been presented creates nothing but feelings of disdain for the makers of the film". A critic from Kalki said the cast performances were the film's only redeeming feature. The film become a hit at the box-office, running for over 100 days in theatres.

== Legacy ==
Sivaji Ganesan's residence is named after the film's title.
