= Devika =

Indian actress (1943–2002)

- Devika in one of her movies
- Born: Prameela Devi; 25 April 1943; Madras, Madras Presidency, British India (present day Chennai, Tamil Nadu, India)
- Died: 2 May 2002 (aged 59); Chennai, Tamil Nadu, India
- Occupation: Actress
- Years active: 1957–1986
- Spouse: Devadas (m. 1968; div. 1990)
- Children: Kanaka (b.1973)
- Relatives: Raghupathi Venkaiah Naidu (grandfather)

Devika Devadoss (born Prameela Devi; 25 April 1943 – 2 May 2002) was an Indian actress who worked in Tamil and Telugu along with a few Malayalam, Kannada, and Hindi films. She was one of the popular lead actresses in the 1960s.

Devika is the daughter of Gajapati Naidu and granddaughter of Telugu cinema doyen and pioneer Raghupathi Venkaiah Naidu. One of her uncles, C. Basudev, served as the mayor of Chennai. Actress Kanaka is her only daughter.

== Film career ==
In Tamil, she acted with all major heroes of the day. In Mudhalali, an AVM film, in which she made her debut, she was paired with S. S. Rajendran. The film received a certificate as the (Best regional language film) for the year and the National Film Award for Best Feature Film in Tamil.

She paired with M. G. Ramachandran in Anandha Jodhi. She won accolades and her portrayal was a critical and commercial success.

With Sivaji Ganesan she acted in the films Karnan, Kulamagal Radhai, Andavan Kattalai, Anbu Karangal, Annai Illam, Paava Mannippu, Muradan Muthu, Neela Vaanam and Bale Pandiya.

She portrayed Radha in the film Sumaithaangi alongside Gemini Ganesan as his tragic lover. The film was directed by Sridhar. Her performance received critical acclaim.

She acted in some other Sridhar films like Nenjam Marappathillai and Nenjil Or Aalayam. The song Sonnadhu Nee thaanaa in Nenjil or Aalayam became a hit because of her acting, apart from the lyrics and music.

== Death ==
Devika was admitted to Madras Hospital when she complained of chest pain and after a few days she died following a heart attack.

== Filmography ==
=== Tamil ===
- Naanum Oru Thozhilali (1986)
- Kanthar Alangaram (1978)
- Sathyam (1976)
- Ippadiyum Oru Penn (1975)
- Pillai Selvam (1974)
- Paruva Kaalam (1974)
- Bharatha Vilas (1973)
- Anbu Sagodharargal (1973)
- Veguli Penn (1971)
- Annai Velankanni (1971)
- Engirundho Vandhaal (1970)
- Devi (1968)
- Deiveega Uravu (1968)
- Thaaye Unakkaga (1966)
- Saraswathi Sabatham (1966)
- Marakka Mudiyuma? (1966)
- Thiruvilaiyadal (1965)
- Anbu Karangal (1965)
- Shanthi (1965) as Malliga
- Neela Vaanam (1965)
- Pazhani (1965)
- Vaazhkai Padagu (1965)
- Muradan Muthu (1964)
- Karnan (1964)
- Aandavan Kattalai (1964)
- Nenjam Marappathillai (1963)
- Idhayathil Nee (1963)
- Anandha Jodhi (1963)
- Kulamagal Radhai (1963)
- Vanambadi (1963)
- Kubera Theevu (1963)
- Yarukku Sontham (1963)
- Kadavulai Kanden (1963)
- Pannaiyar Magan (1963)
- Annai Illam (1963)
- Nenjil Or Aalayam (1962)
- Pirandha Naal (1962)
- Neeya Naana? (1962)
- Bandha Pasam (1962)
- Sumaithaangi (1962)
- Dakshayagnam (1962) as Sathi Devi
- Bale Pandiya (1962)
- Aadi Perukku (1962)
- Nenjil Or Aalayam (1962)
- Pangaaligal (1961)
- Mamiyarum Oru Veetu Marumagale (1961)
- Malliyam Mangalam (1961)
- Kaanal Neer (1961)
- Paava Mannippu (1961)
- Naaga Nandhini (1961)
- Kalathur Kannamma (1960)
- Ivan Avanethan (1960)
- Panchaali (1959)
- Sahodhari (1959)
- Naalu Veli Nilam (1959)
- Anbu Engey (1958)
- Manamagan Thevai (1957)
- Mudhalali (1957)

=== Telugu ===
- Rechukka (1955) as Lalitha Devi
- Atta okinti kodale (1958)
- Sabhash Ramudu (1959)
- Anna Chellalu (1960)
- Mangalyam (1960)
- Sahasra Siracheda Apoorva Chinthamani (1960) as Apoorva Chinthamani
- Santhi Nivasam (1960)
- Taxi Ramudu (1961)
- Batasari (1961)
- Pendli Pilupu (1961)
- Papa Pariharam (1961)
- Sabhash Raja (1961)
- Chitti Tammudu (1962)
- Dakshayagnam (1962) as Sathi Devi
- Gaali Medalu (1962)
- Mahamantri Timmarusu (1962)
- Nuvva? Nena? (1962)
- Rakta Sambandham (1962)
- Somavara Vrata Mahatyam (1963) as Srimanthini
- Pempudu Koothuru (1963)
- Desa Drohulu (1964)
- Aada Brathuku (1965)
- Mangalasutram (1966)
- Sri Krishnavataram (1967)
- Bhama Vijayam (1967)
- Kanchu Kota (1967)
- Nindu Manasulu (1967)
- Pinni (1967)
- Niluvu Dopidi (1968)
- Papa Kosam (1968)
- Tara Sasankam (1969) as Tara
- Gandikota Rahasyam (1969) as Lalitha
- Vijayam Manade (1970)
- Suguna Sundari Katha (1970) as Suguna Devi
- Rajakota Rahasyam (1971) as Kanchana
- Chinnanati Snehitulu (1971)
- Papam Pasivadu (1972) as Janaki
- Pandanti Kapuram (1972)
- Sri Krishnanjaneya Yuddham (1972)
- Korada Rani (1972) as Rani's (Jyothi Lakshmi) elder sister
- Palleturi Chinnodu (1974)...Janakamma
- Nippulanti Manishi (1974)
- Gadusu Pillodu (1977) as Vimala
- Adavalle Aligithe (1983)
- Srimadvirat Veerabrahmendra Swami Charitra (1984)
- Andarikante Ghanudu (1987)

=== Malayalam ===
- Pullimaan (1972)
- C.I.D. In Jungle (1971)
- Nizhalattam (1970)
- Karuna (1966)
- Kattupookkal (1965) as Annie

=== Hindi ===
- Naya Din Nai Raat (1974)
- Grahasti (1963)
- Man-Mauji (1962)
- Gharana (1961)
- Ghar Sansar (1958)

=== Kannada ===
- Maadi Madidavaru (1974)
- Bhale Rani (1972)
