= Tamil Nadu State Film Award for Best Child Artist =

Indian film award

The Tamil Nadu State Film Award for Best Child Star is given by the Tamil Nadu state government as part of its annual Tamil Nadu State Film Awards for Tamil-language (Kollywood) films.

== The recipients ==
Here is a list of the award recipients and the films for which they won.

Year	Actor	Film
2022	Baby Davia	Akka Kuruvi
2021	Arnav Vijay	Oh My Dog
2020	-	-
2019	-	-
2018	-	-
2017	-	-
2016	-	-
2015	Master Nishesh, Baby Vaishnavi	Pasanga 2
2014	Vignesh, Ramesh	Kaaka Muttai
2013	Sadhana	Thanga Meengal
2012	-	-
2011	Baby Sara	Deiva Thirumagal
2010	Aswath Ram	Nandalala
2009	Kishore DS, Sree Raam	Pasanga
2008	Srilakshmi	Vannathupoochi
2007	-	-
2006	-	-
2005	-	-
2004	-	-
2003	N.Madhankumar	-
2002	P. S. Keerthana	Kannathil Muthamittal
2001	Kuralarasan	Sonnal Thaan Kathala
2000	Yuvakanth	Maayi
1999	Vikki	Oruvan
1998	Mahendran	Kumbakonam Gopalu
1997	Jennifer	Nerukku Ner
1996	'Baby' Annie	Avvai Shanmugi
1995	Mahendran	Thaikulame Thaikulame
1994	Baby Monica	En Aasai Machan
1993	Not awarded	
1992	Not awarded	
1991	Not awarded	
1990	Baby Shamili	Anjali
1989	Not awarded	
1988	Not awarded	
1987	Not awarded	
1986	Not awarded	
1985	Not awarded	
1984	Not awarded	
1983	Not awarded	
1982	Not awarded	
1981	Not awarded	
1980	Not awarded	
1979	Not awarded	
1978	Baby Sudha	Varuvan Vadivelan
1977	Baby Indira	Anbin Alaigal
1976	Not awarded	
1975	Not awarded	
1974	Not awarded	
1973	Not awarded	
1972	Not awarded	
1971	Not awarded	
1970	Master Krishnakumar	Namma Kuzhandaigal
1969	Baby Rani	Kanne Pappa

== See also ==
- Tamil cinema
- Cinema of India
