= Premalu Pellillu =

- Theatrical release poster
- Directed by: V. Madhusudhana Rao
- Written by: Acharya Aatreya (dialogues)
- Screenplay by: V. Madhusudhana Rao
- Story by: madireddy sulochana
- Produced by: D. Bhaskara Rao
- Starring: Akkineni Nageswara Rao; Jayalalithaa; Sharada
- Cinematography: P. S. Selvaraj
- Edited by: K. A. Marthand; Narasimha Rao
- Music by: M. S. Viswanathan
- Production company: Sri Ananta Lakshmi Art Pictures
- Release date: 12 January 1974
- Running time: 159 minutes
- Country: India
- Language: Telugu

Premalu Pellillu (transl. Love stories and marriages) is a 1974 Indian Telugu-language drama film, produced by D. Bhaskara Rao under the Sri Ananta Lakshmi Art Pictures banner and directed by V. Madhusudhana Rao. It stars Akkineni Nageswara Rao, Jayalalithaa, and Sharada with music composed by M. S. Viswanathan.

== Plot ==
Dr. Madhu is a highly respected idealist who marries Indira, a vain and spendthrift woman. Madhu’s orthodox mother only half-heartedly accepts the marriage, and a constant rift grows between the two women due to their completely opposite lifestyles.

Meanwhile, in a nearby village, an upright man named Raghavaiah lives with his wife Janaki, his son Mohan, and his niece Radha. Raghavaiah wants Mohan and Radha to marry, but his greedy wife, Janaki, fiercely opposes the match because Radha is poor.

Radha fractures her leg and is treated by Dr. Madhu, establishing a connection between them.

Malathi, the daughter of a wealthy tycoon, is crippled in a separate accident. Plunged into a deep depression, she is comforted by Mohan. Mohan begins visiting Malathi frequently. When Malathi falls in love with him, the materialistic Mohan eagerly accepts her proposal for her money. This enrages his honorable father, Raghavaiah, but gains the enthusiastic support of his greedy mother, Janaki. Mohan abandons Radha and marries Malathi. Heartbroken by the betrayal, Radha leaves the village for the city to find a job, where she happens to befriend Madhu’s cousin, Saroja.

Years pass, and Madhu and Indira have two children. However, Indira’s reckless spending plunges the family into colossal debt. Indira treats her own children with cold detachment and constantly disdains her mother-in-law. Madhu finally snaps, divorces Indra and spirals into a severe drug addiction.

Seeing the family disintegrate, Saroja brings Radha into their home. Radha restores order to the household and showers the neglected infants with motherly affection. Desperate to save her son, Madhu’s mother begs him to remarry. Madhu agrees to a second marriage with Radha, but under one harsh stipulation: she will be a mother to his children, but never his true wife. Radha selflessly accepts the terms, and they marry. From that moment on, Radha unconditionally adores Madhu and patiently strives to reform him and pull him back from the brink.

== Cast ==
- Akkineni Nageswara Rao as Dr. Madhu
- Jayalalithaa as Indira / Indu
- Sharada as Anuradha
- S. V. Ranga Rao as Raghavaiah
- Ramakrishna as Dr. Raghu
- Sreedhar as Mohan
- Raja Babu as Paul
- Allu Ramalingaiah as Sundar
- Sakshi Ranga Rao as Priest
- Bhanu Prakash as Malathi's father
- G. Varalakshmi as Madhu's mother
- Geetanjali as Saroja
- Manorama as Puppy
- Sandhya Rani as Malathi
- Jhansi as Mallamma
- Baby Rani
- Nirmalamma as Janaki

== Soundtrack ==
Premalu Pellillu

Film score by M. S. Viswanathan
- Released: 1974
- Genre: Soundtrack
- Length: 21:44
- Producer: M. S. Viswanathan

Music composed by M. S. Viswanathan. Music released on Audio Company.

S. No	Song title	Lyrics	Singers	length
1	"Chiliki Chiliki"	C. Narayana Reddy	V. Ramakrishna, P. Susheela	4:34
2	"Manasulu Murise"	Dasaradhi	V. Ramakrishna, P. Susheela	3:59
3	"Evaru Neevu Nee Roopamedi"	Acharya Aatreya	Ghantasala, P. Susheela	4:45
4	"Evarunnaru Papa"	Dasaradhi	P. Susheela	4:02
5	"Manasu Leni Devudu"	Acharya Aatreya	V. Ramakrishna	4:24

== Reception ==
On 25 January 1974, Griddaluru Gopalrao of Zamin Ryot gave a mixed review for the film. He termed it watchable, but criticized the poorly made romantic scenes and humour. Andhra Jyothi critic Bharadwaja in his review dated 14 January 1974 appreciated the performances and the soundtrack.
