= Kanne Pappa =

- Theatrical poster
- Directed by: P. Madhavan
- Written by: Balamurugan
- Starring: K. R. Vijaya; R. Muthuraman; Baby Rani; J. P. Chandrababu
- Cinematography: P. N. Sundaram
- Edited by: R. Devarajan
- Music by: M. S. Viswanathan
- Production company: Muthuvel Movies
- Release date: 6 June 1969
- Country: India
- Language: Tamil

Kanne Pappa is a 1969 Indian Tamil-language film, directed by P. Madhavan. The film stars K. R. Vijaya, R. Muthuraman, Baby Rani and J. P. Chandrababu. It was released on 6 June 1969. The film was remade in Hindi by Madhavan as Aansoo Aur Muskan and also in Telugu as Bhale Papa. The Hindi and Telugu films were released in January and July 1971, respectively.

== Cast ==
- K. R. Vijaya as Kalyani and Kalpana
- R. Muthuraman as Bhaskar
- Baby Rani as Lakshmi
- J. P. Chandrababu as Kannaiah
- C. R. Vijayakumari as Margaret
- Thengai Srinivasan as Pattakathi Mannaru
- M. N. Nambiar as Inspector James
- Manorama as Roopa
- V. K. Ramasamy as Nanda Gopala Samy
- Major Sundarrajan
- Rama Prabha as Subbhamma
- C. K. Saraswathi as Andalammal
- Kannan as Shankar
- V. S. Raghavan as Station Master
- Suruli Rajan as Dharman
- Pakoda Kadhar as Mandu

== Soundtrack ==
The music was composed by M. S. Viswanathan, with lyrics by Kannadasan.

Song	Singers	Length
"Kanne Pappa"	Susheela	03.17
"Thendralil Aadai"	Susheela	3:54
"Chippikull Pani Vizhunthu"	Susheela	2:00
"Sathiya Muthirai" (Adhu Vanagam Padiya)	Susheela	4:10
"Kanne Pappa" (sad)	Susheela	2:55
"Kalathil Idhu Nalla"	L. R. Eswari	3:57
"Baktharai Kakkum Pandu Ranga"		1:06

== Reception ==
The Indian Express wrote, "Kanne Pappa is a miserable attempt at producing a rather intelligent and interesting story. What really marred the picture is the most unimaginative screenplay and the equally incompetent direction." Baby Rani won the Tamil Nadu State Film Award for Best Child Artist.
