= P. Achutha Menon =

Indian civil servant and diplomat (1905–1975)

Parakat Achutha Menon

Envoy Extraordinary and Minister Plenipotentiary to Portugal
- In office 19 November 1949 – 1 August 1951
- Preceded by: Embassy established

Ambassador of India to Belgium and Luxembourg
- In office 11 October 1951 – 1953
- Preceded by: Nedyam Raghavan
- Succeeded by: K. K. Chettur

Personal details
- Born: 2 January 1905
- Died: 10 August 1975 (aged 70) Madras (now Chennai), Tamil Nadu, India

Parakat Achutha Menon (2 January 1905 – 10 August 1975) was an Indian civil servant and diplomat who served as India's first minister to Portugal, and subsequently served as an ambassador to Belgium, Luxembourg and West Germany.

== Career ==
Educated at the University of Madras and New College, Oxford, Menon subsequently sat the Indian Civil Service exams and passed into the batch of 1929 with effect from 9 October. Among his fellow batchmates were Bhagwan Sahay, later Governor of Jammu and Kashmir, and Humphrey Trevelyan, who also became a diplomat. Arriving in India in November 1929, Menon initially served in the Madras Presidency, and was appointed a sub-collector in May 1931 and an under-secretary in the provincial Public Works Department in January 1934. In April 1937, he was appointed under-secretary in the Home Department of the central government. In July 1943, he was posted to the United States as a deputy secretary and later secretary with the Indian Supply Mission.

On 19 November 1949, Menon was appointed India's first minister to Portugal. On 1 August 1951, he was appointed chargé d'affaires at the embassy in Italy. On 11 October 1951, he was appointed ambassador to Belgium, and Luxembourg. He later served as ambassador to West Germany before his retirement in 1964.
