= Ezhai Pangalan =

1963 film directed by K. Shankar

- Poster
- Directed by: K. Shankar
- Written by: M. Lakshmanan
- Produced by: K. V. Mahadevan
- Starring: Gemini Ganesan; Ragini; Pushpalatha; M. N. Nambiar
- Cinematography: Thambu
- Edited by: K. Narayanan
- Music by: K. V. Mahadevan
- Production company: Rajalaxmi Pictures
- Distributed by: Mahalakshmi Pictures
- Release date: 20 December 1963
- Running time: 134 minutes
- Country: India
- Language: Tamil

Ezhai Pangalan (transl. Poor partner) is a 1963 Indian Tamil-language film directed by K. Shankar, written by M. Lakshmanan and produced by K. V. Mahadevan, who also composed the music. The film stars Gemini Ganesan, Ragini, Pushpalatha and M. N. Nambiar. It was released on 20 December 1963.

== Cast ==
Male cast

- Gemini Ganesan as Raja
- M. N. Nambiar
- S. A. Ashokan
- T. S. Muthiah
- K. Balaji
- V. Mahalingam
- S. V. Ramadas
- K. D. Santhanam
- Nagesh

Female cast

- Ragini
- Pushpalatha
- Manorama
- Malathi
- M. S. S. Bhyagyam
- Lakshmi Prabha
- S. M. Dharma
- Radhabhai
- Aalwar Kuppusamy

== Production ==
Ezhai Pangalan is the inaugural production of Rajalaxmi Pictures. It was produced by K. V. Mahadevan, and directed by K. Shankar. The film was written by M. Lakshmanan. Thambu was the cinematographer, K. S. Baskar the operative cameraman, K. Narayanan the editor, and A. Balu the art director. The final length of the film was 4,159 metres (13,645 ft).

== Themes ==
Ezhai Pangalan deals with the problems of slum dwellers.

== Soundtrack ==
The soundtrack was composed by K. V. Mahadevan.

Song	Singer/s	Lyricist	Duration
"Thaayaaga Maaravaa"	T. M. Soundararajan	Panchu Arunachalam	02:51
"Manadhil Enna Mayakkam"	T. M. Soundararajan, P. Susheela	Panchu Arunachalam	04:54
"Muttaiyai Vittu"	T. M. Soundararajan	Kannadasan	03:22
"Veettukku Vantha Machan"	P. Susheela	Vaali	04:46
"Vilakku Erigindradhu"	T. M. Soundararajan	Kannadasan	04:53
"Oorazhudha Verlaiyile"	T. M. Soundararajan	Vaali	

== Release ==
Ezhai Pangalan was released on 20 December 1963, and distributed by Mahalakshmi Pictures. T. M. Ramachadran, writing for Sport and Pastime, lauded it as a "realistic, purposeful film".
