= Ratha Thilagam =

- Theatrical release poster
- Directed by: Dada Mirasi
- Screenplay by: Dada Mirasi
- Produced by: Panchu Arunachalam; P. V. Krishnan
- Starring: Sivaji Ganesan; Savitri Ganesan
- Cinematography: Jagirdhar
- Edited by: R. Devarajan
- Music by: K. V. Mahadevan
- Production company: National Movies
- Release date: 14 September 1963
- Running time: 142 minutes
- Country: India
- Language: Tamil

Ratha Thilagam (transl. Tilaka of Blood) is a 1963 Indian Tamil-language war romance film directed by Dada Mirasi. The film stars Sivaji and Savitri Ganesan (no relation). Based on the Sino-Indian border dispute of 1962, it was released on 14 September 1963. The film was not commercially successful.

== Plot ==
Kumar is a graduate who decides to enlist in the Indian Army, following news of the Chinese invasion during the Sino-Indian War. He soon learns that his love interest Kamala has been working against the Indian Army.

== Cast ==
- Sivaji Ganesan as Major Kumar
- Savitri Ganesan as Kamala
- Nagesh as Madurai
- Kannappa as a Chinese doctor
- Kannaiah as Military Rajarathnam
- Gundu Karuppaya as Kumar's hostel servant
- Veerasami
- Shanmugasundaram as Chinese military officer
- Parthiban
- Pushpalatha
- Manorama as Poonkuyil
- Janaki
- Comedy Shanmugam as Madurai Assistant

== Production ==
Ratha Thilagam is based on the Sino-Indian border dispute of 1962. It was directed by Dada Mirasi who also wrote the screenplay. It was produced under National Movies by Panchu Arunachalam and P. V. Krishnan while Kannadasan, along with, P.C. Ganesan and Thyagan wrote the dialogue; Kannadasan also presented the film. Cinematography was handled by Jagirdhar and editing by R. Devarajan.

== Themes ==
Critic Baradwaj Rangan noted Ratha Thilagam's similarities to the Bengali film Saptapadi (1961) in that both films had "the backdrop of war, the star-crossed lovers, and, of course, the staging of Othello, which, in both films, appears to have been dubbed by the same voices (Jennifer Kapoor, Utpal Dutt)." Writing for The Times of India, Ganesh Krishnamoorthy felt that, as the film was set in the backdrop of the Sino-Indian War, "this scene, used as a play enacted by the characters, provides a structural unity to the main plot."

== Soundtrack ==
The music was composed by K. V. Mahadevan, with lyrics by Kannadasan. The songs "Oru Koppaiyila" and "Pasumai Niraintha" were well received.

Song	Singers	Length
"Buddhan Vanthan"	T. M. Soundararajan	02:55
"Happy Birthday"	Suzi Miller	03:22
"Oru Koppaiyile"	T. M. Soundararajan	02:33
"Pani Padarntha"	T. M. Soundararajan	06:06
"Pasumai Niraintha"	T. M. Soundararajan, P. Susheela	03:49
"Pogathe Pogathe"	Manorama	01:56
"Thazhampoove"	T. M. Soundararajan, L. R. Eswari	05:53
"Vaadai Kaatramma"	L. R. Eswari	03:27

== Release and reception ==
Ratha Thilagam was released on 14 September 1963. Kanthan of Kalki praised the film for the comedy subplot and the Othello play. T. M. Ramachandran, writing for Sport and Pastime, commended Ganesan and Savitri's performances, calling their roles in the Othello play the film's pièce de résistance. The film was not commercially successful.
