= Yarukku Sontham =

- Theatrical release poster
- Directed by: K. V. Srinivasan
- Written by: Elangovan (dialogues); K. Devarajan (comedy)
- Screenplay by: K. V. Srinivasan
- Starring: Kalyan Kumar; Devika; Rajasree
- Cinematography: C. A. S. Mani
- Edited by: L. Balu
- Music by: K. V. Mahadevan
- Production company: Modern Theatres
- Release date: 26 July 1963
- Country: India
- Language: Tamil

Yarukku Sondham (transl. Belongs to whom?) is a 1963 Indian Tamil-language film directed by K. V. Srinivasan. The film stars Kalyan Kumar, Devika and Rajasree. It was released on 26 July 1963.

== Cast ==
The list was compiled from Thiraikalanjiyam and from the film credits

Male cast

- Kalyan Kumar
- S. V. Subbaiah
- J. P. Chandrababu
- R. S. Manohar (Guest)
- P. D. Sambandam
- T. S. Muthiah
- Socrates Thangaraj
- S. K. Karikol Raj

Female cast

- Devika
- Rajasree
- B. S. Saroja
- Pushpalatha
- Malathi
- Manorama
- Aruna Devi

== Production ==
The film was produced by Modern Theatres and was directed by K. V. Srinivasan who also wrote the screenplay. Elangovan wrote the dialogues while the comedy part dialogues were penned by K. Devarajan. C. A. S. Mani was in charge of cinematography while L. Balu did the editing. Processing was done by T. P. Krishnamoorthi. P. S. Narasimhan did the audiography, and Jayaram the choreography. B. Nagarajan was the art director and Y. Sivayya the stunt master.

== Soundtrack ==
Music was composed by K. V. Mahadevan.

Song	Singer/s	Lyricist	Length
"Poovukkul Thenai Vaiththavan Oorenna?"	P. Susheela	Panchu Arunachalam	03:16
"Deal Deal Deal, Yenge Pora Nee"	K. Jamuna Rani	Panchu Arunachalam	03:32
"Ennai Theriyalaiyaa, Innum Puriyalaiyaa"	J. P. Chandrababu	A. Maruthakasi	03:42
"Vandukku Thaen Vendum"	P. B. Srinivas & P. Susheela	A. Maruthakasi	03:54
"Ethanai Ethanai Inbamada"	P. B. Srinivas	A. Maruthakasi	02:28
"Oho Mary Bul Bul Vaariyaa"	J. P. Chandrababu & K. Jamuna Rani	Villiputhan	03:56
