= Neengadha Ninaivu =

- Poster
- Directed by: W. R. Subba Rao
- Written by: Maa. Raa (dialogues)
- Story by: Azm Bazidpuri
- Starring: S. S. Rajendran; Kalyan Kumar; C. R. Vijayakumari; Pushpalatha
- Music by: K. V. Mahadevan
- Production company: Padma Films
- Release date: 15 March 1963
- Running time: 2:40:47
- Country: India
- Language: Tamil

Neengadha Ninaivu (transl. An Unforgetable Memory) is a 1963 Indian Tamil-language film, directed by W. R. Subba Rao. It is a remake of the 1951 Hindi-language film Deedar. The film stars S. S. Rajendran, Kalyan Kumar, C. R. Vijayakumari and Pushpalatha. It was released on 15 March 1963.

== Plot ==
The story starts with a friendship between two young children. The girl is from an affluent family and she is friends with a poor boy. Both of them used to ride on a horse for fun. The girl's father does not like their friendship. One day he accuses the boy of pushing the girl off the horse and forbids their meeting thereafter. The children grow up. The boy, now a young man, Kumar, lives in a farmer's house. Another farmer's daughter loves him. Kumar loses his eyesight in an accident and he and the lover girl make their living by singing in the streets. Kumar becomes acquainted with an eye surgeon and surgeon restores his eyesight. The surgeon becomes friendly with Kumar and he tells the surgeon about his childhood sweetheart. But when Kumar tells the name of his childhood friend, Mala, the surgeon is shocked because he is in love with Mala. Kumar learns that Mala is the surgeon's lover. He blinds himself again and returns to singing on the streets.

== Cast ==
The list is adapted from the review article published in The Hindu.

Male cast

- S. S. Rajendran
- Kalyan Kumar
- V. K. Ramasamy
- C. K. Nagesh
- S. Ramarao
- 'Master' Mohan

Female cast

- C. R. Vijayakumari
- Pushpalatha
- T. V. Kumudhini
- C. R. Manorama
- 'Baby' Savithri

== Soundtrack ==
Music was composed by K. V. Mahadevan. The song Netru vandhu Indrirundhu Naalai Pogum is the first Vaali's song sung by T. M. Soundararajan. The song Chinnagnchiru Malarai Maranduvidaathe set to the tune of the Hindi version song "Bachpan Ke Din Bhoolana Dena" composed by Naushad, was a hit.

Song	Singer/s	Lyricist	Duration (m:ss)
"Oh.. Oh.. Chinnagnchiru Malarai Maranduvidaathe"	P. Susheela & L. R. Eswari	Vaali	03:04
"Netru vandhu Indrirundhu Naalai Pogum"	T. M. Soundararajan	Vaali	03:24
"Oh.. Oh.. Chinnagnchiru Malarai Maranduvidaathe" – another version	T. M. Soundararajan	Vaali	01:17
"Paarthathundaa Kettathundaa"	L. R. Eswari & group	A. Maruthakasi	02:28
"Kan Paarvai Kavi Paadum"	P. Susheela	A. Maruthakasi	03:26
"Engiruntha Pothum Unnai Marakka Mudiyumaa"	P. Susheela	A. Maruthakasi	03:08
"Un Kathaiyum En Kathaiyum"	T. M. Soundararajan	A. Maruthakasi	03:19
"Anbu Vaazhga Aasai Vaazhga"	T. M. Soundararajan & P. Susheela	Kannadasan	03:22
"Kadhaiyai Kettadhum Maranthuvidu"	P. B. Srinivas	Kothamangalam Subbu	04:09

== Reception ==
Film historian Randor Guy said the film is "Remembered for the performances of S. S. Rajendran and Kalyankumar.
