= Paar Magaley Paar =

1963 film directed by A. Bhimsingh

- Theatrical release poster
- Directed by: A. Bhimsingh
- Screenplay by: Valampuri Somanathan
- Based on: Petral Thaan Pillaiya by Pattu
- Produced by: V. C. Subburaman
- Starring: Sivaji Ganesan; Sowcar Janaki; R. Muthuraman; C. R. Vijayakumari
- Cinematography: G. Vittal Rao
- Edited by: A. Bhimsingh; A. Paul Duraisingham; R. Thirumalai
- Music by: Viswanathan–Ramamoorthy
- Production company: Kasturi Films
- Distributed by: Sivaji Films
- Release date: 12 July 1963
- Running time: 152 minutes
- Country: India
- Language: Tamil

Paar Magaley Paar (pronounced [paːɾ maɡaɭeː paːɾ] transl. Look daughter, look) is a 1963 Indian Tamil-language drama film directed by A. Bhimsingh and written by Valampuri Somanathan. Based on the play Petral Thaan Pillaiya by Pattu, which in turn was based on the Hindi film Parvarish (1958), it stars Sivaji Ganesan, M. R. Radha, Sowcar Janaki and C. R. Vijayakumari. The film was released on 12 July 1963.

== Plot ==
Zamindar Sivalingam is married to Lakshmiammal and takes his family's prestige and heritage very seriously. Dancer Sulochana and Lakshmiammal have baby girls at the same time in the same hospital.

Sivalingam is not in town at the time of the delivery and his close friend Ramaswamy takes care of Lakshmiammal. When the babies are taken for cleaning by the nurses, there is a short circuit and both nurses die. There is no way of identifying the babies. Sulochana who was abandoned by her husband, leaves the hospital. The doctor brings both babies to Lakshmiammal and she too cannot identify which is her baby.

Sivalingam arrives and seeing both babies in the room assumes he has twins. Knowing how important the family line is to him, Lakshmiammal, Ramaswamy and the doctor don't tell him the truth. Both girls, Chandra and Kantha, grow up as the zamindar's daughters. Sulochana's brother, Nadaraj, who learns that his niece is growing up in Sivalingam's household and faced with the same confusion, takes up Lakshmiammal's offer and stays on there as a caretaker. Meanwhile, Lakshmiammal and Ramaswamy's wife, Parvathi, who are childhood friends promise to get their children married to each other.

Chandra has a birthmark which is said to be very lucky, but is by nature more like her Lakshmiammal. Kantha is more like Sivalingam. Chandra falls in love with her classmate Shekar. Since he is the son of his wealthy friend, the late Mohanasundaram, Sivalingam agrees to the wedding.

Ramaswamy, who lives lavishly and is careless in his business matters, faces severe business losses and approaches Sivalingam to support his business. Sivalingam promises to give him money, but refuses to let him use his name or claim his acquaintance. He also gives a job to Sundaram in one of his factories, but refuses to have any further contacts with their family.

When Ramaswamy and Parvathi hear that Chandra's engagement is fixed, they attend the function uninvited. Sivalingam insults them and Ramaswamy is driven to reveal that one of his daughters is not his own. The doctor who was also present there needs to confide too. The engagement is stopped and the family is thrown into confusion. Due to this, Shekar's mother (Rukmani) forces him to leave the place.

Sivalingam refuses to talk to his family or the children and becomes extremely disturbed. Chandra tries to solve the problem by leaving the house. She gives a lady called Maragatham her ring to act as the dancer Sulochana. Maragatham goes to Sivalingam's house and says that her daughter can be identified by means of a birthmark.

The police arrive with some jewels and a suicide note from Chandra and they realise that she is now dead. Sivalingam is very happy when he finally becomes convinced that Kantha is his real daughter and fixes her marriage with Shekar. Lakshmiammal is very disturbed because she believes that all the confusion in the house was caused because they did not keep their word to Ramaswamy and Parvathi and get one of the daughters married to Sundaram.

Kantha wants to humiliate Sivalingam, whose conceit caused Chandra's death and she made Lakshiammal practically bedridden. She refuses to marry Shekar and says that she will marry Sundaram. Meanwhile, Nadaraj, who was thrown out of the house by Sivalingam, traces Maragatham through the ring that she tried to pawn and the family is again thrown into confusion.

Meanwhile, Chandra, who attempts suicide by jumping into a river is saved by the students of an ashram. They persuade her to stay on as a teacher to the orphan students and she agrees. Shekar who is now an Education Inspector comes to the school and sees her. The principal, however, convinces him that she is an orphan girl who always lived in the ashram.

Shekar then narrates the story of Chandra and also tells the principal that her sacrifice was wasted because Maragatham confessed the truth. He also tells her that both Sivalingam and Lakshmi are bedridden and that Kantha is struggling to care for both parents. Chandra wants to go back home, but makes up her mind to move away instead. She requests a transfer. Nadaraj overhears the principal and Chandra talking and is realises that Chandra is alive. He tells Sivalingam and Lakshmiammal and they set out in search of her.

Chandra's taxi hits Sivalingam and he is admitted in the hospital. Both daughters give him blood and he understands that character is more important than family's prestige and heritage. Sivalingam who had turned over a new leaf accepts both Chandra and Kantha as his daughters. Finally, Chandra marries Shekar and Kantha marries Sundaram as both Sivalingam and Ramaswamy reunited.

== Cast ==
- Sivaji Ganesan as Zamindar Sivalingam
- Sowcar Janaki as Lakshmi
- R. Muthuraman as Shekar
- C. R. Vijayakumari as Chandra / Saradha
- A. V. M. Rajan as Sundaram
- Pushpalatha as Kaantha
- Kumari Rukmani as Shekar's mother
- V. K. Ramasamy as Ramasamy
- M. R. Radha as Nataraj
- A. Karunanidhi as Manickam
- Cho as Madasamy
- Manorama as Aaravalli
- N. Seethalakshmi
- Radhabhai as Parvathi
- S. R. Janaki as the principal
- Tambaram Lalitha as the doctor
- M. S. S. Bhagyam as Maragatham
- Seethalakshmi as Aravalli's mother

== Production ==
Paar Magaley Paar was a film adaptation of the stage play Petral Thaan Pillaiya, itself based on the Hindi film Parvarish (1958). The play had the concept of two sons, but it was changed to daughters for the film. As a result, Y. G. Mahendran, who portrayed one of the two sons in the play and was signed on to reprise the role in the film, was unable to do so. Cho Ramaswamy, who played a character named "Mechanical Madasamy" in the play, reprised his role in the film, which also marked his cinematic acting debut. Ganesan's home, Annai Illam, also features in the film.

== Soundtrack ==
The soundtrack was composed by Viswanathan–Ramamoorthy.

Song	Singers	Lyrics	Length
"Aval Paranthu Ponale"	T. M. Soundararajan, P. B. Sreenivas	Kannadasan	05:19
"Ennai Thottu"	P. B. Sreenivas, P. Susheela	Kannadasan	03:21
"Enthan Kannai"	A. L. Raghavan, L. R. Eswari	Kannadasan	03:27
"Madhura Nagaril"	P. B. Sreenivas, P. Susheela	Kannadasan	05:44
"Neerodum Vaikaiyile"	T. M. Soundararajan, P. Susheela	Kannadasan	04:30
"Paar Magaley Paar"	T. M. Soundararajan	Kannadasan	05:02
"Paar Magaley Paar" 2	M. S. Viswanathan	Kannadasan	02:31
"Poochudum Nerathile"	P. Susheela	Kannadasan	03:46
"Thuyil Kondal"	P. Susheela	Kannadasan	03:06
"Vetkamai Irukkuthu"	P. Leela, Soolamangalam Rajalakshmi	Shuddhananda Bharathiyar	06:59

== Release and reception ==
Paar Magaley Paar was released on 12 July 1963, distributed by Ganesan's Sivaji Films, and sold for ₹21 lakh (equivalent to ₹17 crore or US$1.8 million in 2023). Writing for Sport and Pastime, T. M. Ramachandran derided the film, comparing it unfavourably to the original play but praised the performance of the cast, particularly Ganesan. Kanthan of Kalki, however, reviewed the film more positively for the cast performances and emotional incidents.
