= Nenjam Marappathillai (1963 film) =

1963 film by C. V. Sridhar

- Theatrical release poster
- Directed by: Sridhar
- Screenplay by: Sridhar
- Story by: M. S. Kasi
- Produced by: M. S. Kasi
- Starring: Kalyan Kumar; Devika
- Cinematography: A. Vincent
- Edited by: N. M. Shankar
- Music by: Viswanathan–Ramamoorthy
- Production company: Manohar Pictures
- Release date: 2 August 1963
- Running time: 144 minutes
- Country: India
- Language: Tamil

Nenjam Marappathillai (transl. The Heart Never Forgets) is a 1963 Indian Tamil-language paranormal romance film written and directed by Sridhar. The film stars Kalyan Kumar and Devika, with M. N. Nambiar, S. V. Sahasranamam, Nagesh, Padmini Priyadarshini and Manorama in supporting roles. It focuses on a college boy who, while exploring a dilapidated villa, learns all the details about his past life.

The film was conceived by Sridhar based on numerous news reports he read about people claiming to remember their past lives. It was produced by M. S. Kasi under his banner Manohar Pictures, had music composed by Viswanathan–Ramamoorthy, cinematography by A. Vincent and editing by N. M. Shankar. The story was credited to Kasi, and Sridhar's brother C. V. Rajendran worked as the associate director.

Nenjam Marappathillai was released on 2 August 1963. The film received a number of positive reviews but did not succeed commercially, though it later attained cult status in Tamil cinema.

== Plot ==
While on a visit to his friend's village, Anand, a college boy, explores a dilapidated villa, falls unconscious and learns all the details about his past life of love and sorrow.

When he was staying in the village, Anand hears the screams of a girl from one of the room that was kept locked in his friend's house. When he inquires with his friend he skips away from answering. But when Anand insists, his friend narrates the incident how his own sister became insane after seeing the dilapidated palace in that village. Out of curiosity, Anand goes to the Villa without his friend's knowledge and realises that he was once son of a prominent Zamindar. This Zamindar's son was in love with a low caste girl and was firm to marry her in spite his Father's protest. When the lovers try to elope, the girl was shot dead by Zamindar and his son was kept in House arrest. The Zamindar swears that he would not allow his son to marry her even if he takes seven births. Eventually the boy dies after few days.

When he was in the palace he meets an elderly person aged 109 years, who is nobody but the same old Zamindar. Without knowing that he is the Zamindar, father of his previous birth, he reveals that the girl who was shot dead by the Zamindar also born in the same village. Now being reminded by his challenge, the zamindar tries to kill that Girl but the boy comes in between. Since Anand is his own son, the Zamindar avoids him and targets the girl. When Anand approached near the Zamindar, the later falls in Quicksand. Lest with the best efforts, Zamindar sinks in the Quicksand and dies. Anand then marries the girl.

== Cast ==
Male cast

- Kalyan Kumar as Chinna Zamindar Raja / Anand
- M. N. Nambiar as the Zamindar
- S. V. Sahasranamam as Velappan
- Nagesh as Veeraiyaa
- Mali as Sundar
- Karikol Raju as Sundar's father
- Gemini Balakrishnan as Madasamy

Female cast

- Devika as Kannamma / Vijaya
- Padmini Priyadarshini as the zamindar's second wife
- Manorama as Kanniyamma
- Seethalakshmi as Bakiyam

== Production ==
On 26 November 1935, The Hindu carried a news article about a nine-year-old Delhi-based girl named Shantha Devi who claimed that she remembered all the details about her past life in which she lived in the town of Mathura. There were similar news reports published by newspapers in Kerala and Rajasthan in 1939. Director Sridhar was attracted by these news reports and the American film Gaslight (1944), and developed a screenplay titled Nenjam Marappathillai based on the theme of reincarnation. Chithralaya Gopu was hired as associate dialogue writer, and Sridhar's brother C. V. Rajendran as associate director. The film was produced by M. S. Kasi under Manohar Pictures, and Kasi claimed credit for the story. It was the maiden venture of Manohar Pictures owned by Kasi, son of Somu of Jupiter Pictures. Cinematography was handled by A. Vincent, and editing by N. M. Shankar. Shooting took place prominently in Kerala. The makeup for Nambiar's character of the zamindar took three hours to apply. During the filming of a scene where the zamindar chases the hero and heroine via horse carriage, one of its wheels suddenly came off. Even though the driver panicked, Nambiar asked him to continue driving the carriage and as it overturned, jumped out, took aim and shot. The final length of the film was 4,472 metres (14,672 ft).

== Soundtrack ==
The music was composed by the duo Viswanathan–Ramamoorthy, while the lyrics were written by Kannadasan assisted by his nephew Panchu Arunachalam. The title song exists in four different versions: a male version, a female version, and two duet versions – one happy and one sad. It took six months to compose the song. That, and the song "Azhagukkum Malarukkum" attained popularity. "Azhagukkum Malarukkum" is set in Eeshamanohari raga while the title song is set in Maand raga. It took 45 days to compose all the songs for the film.

Song	Singers	Length
"Azhagukkum Malarukkum"	P. B. Sreenivas, S. Janaki	03:53
"Kadu Malai Medu Kanda"	T. M. Soundararajan	03:20
"Mundhanai Panthada"	L. R. Eswari, P. Susheela	04:05
"Nenjam Marappathillai" (Duet)	P. B. Sreenivas, P. Susheela	04:04
"Nenjam Marappathillai" (Lady)	P. Susheela	04:21
"Nenjam Marappathillai" (Man)	P. B. Sreenivas	04:06
"Nenjam Marappathillai" (Sad)	P. B. Sreenivas, P. Susheela	03:36
"Thenadi Meenadi"	T. M. Soundararajan, P. Susheela	03:59

== Release ==
Nenjam Marappathillai was released on 2 August 1963. The film did not succeed commercially; according to historian Randor Guy, this was because "many were sceptical about people having recollections of their previous birth."

== Reception ==
Reviewing the film for Sport and Pastime, T. M. Ramachandran said, "Nenjam Marappathillai is one of those rare films which have the makings of a box-office hit without compromising realism or sacrificing good taste." A reviewer for Conservative said, "Sridhar has shaped the [film] on the lines of popular Hindi versions and has used his skill to render the [film] covering two generations extremely interesting and spectacular", and was appreciative of the cinematography and performances of Kalyan Kumar, Devika and Nambiar. Kanthan of Kalki appreciated the film for Sridhar's direction and writing, and Nambiar's costumes and makeup. However, the critic from The Illustrated Weekly of India said, "Ah, what a comedown from the mighty Nenjil Oor Alayam!".

== Legacy ==
Nenjam Marappathillai attained cult status in Tamil cinema. Director Ameer named it one of his most favourite films and said, "Nenjam Marappadhillai not only breaks free from the formulaic screenplay, but director Sridhar does something revolutionary by introducing new faces in it." Cinematographer P. C. Sreeram stated, "I still remember how terrified I was while returning home after watching Nenjam Marapathillai and Athey Kangal. Spooky themes were great entertainers". M. N. Nambiar said that it was one of his favourite films he acted in. A 2019 TV series was named after the film.

== Bibliography ==
- Dipak Nambiar, M. N. (7 March 2019). Nambiarswami: The Good, the Bad and the Holy. HarperCollins. ISBN 978-93-5302-843-5.
- Narayanan, Aranthai (1981). தமிழ் சினிமாவின் கதை [The story of Tamil cinema] (in Tamil). New Century Book House. OCLC 425990359.
