= Vijayakumar filmography =

Indian actor

Vijayakumar is an Indian actor. Along with predominant work in Tamil cinema since 1973, he has acted in Telugu films. He also works in television serials.

He began as a child actor in the film Sri Valli in 1961. Vijaykumar was the little Lord Murugan. Though not many offers were forthcoming for the little actor, he was supposed to play Lord Murugan in Kandhan Karunai, but instead Sivakumar played that role. Vijayakumar acted in a small role as one of the Lords that was arrested by Surapadman. In 1973, Vijayakumar got his first break in Ponnukku Thanga Manasu, directed by Devaraj-Mohan. The other hero in the film was Sivakumar. The success of Ponnuku Thanga Manasu got him a permanent place in Tamil cinema. Vijayakumar was a popular actor the seventies, who acted alongside leading actors such as M. G. Ramachandran, in Indru Pol Endrum Vaazhga, with Sivaji Ganesan in Dheepam and Kamal Haasan in Neeya. While Vijayakumar was a popular supporting actor, he did play the lead role during the 1970s, in films such as Aval Oru Thodarkathai, Madhurageetham and Azhage Unnai Aarathikkiren.

Vijayakumar continued to act in supporting roles in the early 1980s. After a brief slump, Vijayakumar's second innings came in 1988 with Mani Ratnam's Agni Natchathiram, where he played the role of Prabhu Ganesan and Karthik Muthuraman's father. The movie told the story of two half brothers who fight for their father's love and property. During the 1990s, Vijayakumar was frequently seen in father roles such as Nattamai and Baasha. During the same time, Vijayakumar also played lead roles in award-winning films such as Kizhakku Cheemayile and Anthimanthaarai, with Bharathiraaja. The latter took him close to winning the National Film Award for Best Actor, eventually missing it by one vote. Vijayakumar continued to play senior roles during the 2000s; eventually the actor was seen in more grandfather roles. In the last few years, the actor has reduced his film commitments and focused on television serials. Vijayakumar has acted in over 400 films, primarily in Tamil, but also had brief stints in Telugu cinema.

Following is the list of films acted by Vijayakumar. Besides Tamil, he has also acted in Telugu films apart from a few Malayalam and Kannada films.

== Filmography ==
=== 1960s ===
Year	Film	Role	Notes
1961	Sri Valli	Lord Muruga	Child actor
1962	Mahaveera Bheeman		
1965	Thaaye Unakkaga	George	

=== 1970s ===
Year	Film	Role	Notes
1973	Ponnukku Thanga Manasu	Shankar	
1974	Samarpanam	doctor, drunkard	
1974	Maanikka Thottil		
1974	Aval Oru Thodar Kathai	Tilak	
1974	Murugan Kaattiya Vazhi		
1974	Devi Sri Karumari Amman		
1975	Sondhangal Vazhga		
1975	Mayangukiral Oru Maadhu	Balu	
1975	Thennangkeetru		
1975	Aan Pillai Singam		
1975	Manjal Mugame Varuga		
1975	Thai Veetu Seedhanam		Guest Appearance
1975	Paattum Bharathamum	Kumar	
1976	Nee Indri Naan Illai		
1976	Athirshtam Azhaikirathu		Guest Appearance
1976	Payanam	Captain Murali	
1976	Mayor Meenakshi		
1976	Thunive Thunai	CID Vijaykumar	
1976	Varaprasadham		
1976	Janaki Sabadham		
1976	Oru Oodhappu Kan Simittugiradhu	Sasi	Guest Appearance
1976	Asai 60 Naal		
1976	Mutthana Mutthullavo		Guest Appearance
1976	Idhaya Malar	Sreedhar	
1976	Paalooti Valartha Kili		
1976	Akka		
1976	Unmaiye Un Vilai Enna?		
1976	Thayilla Kuzhandhai		
1976	Mogam Muppadhu Varusham	Ravi Shankar	
1977	Punniyam Seithaval		
1977	Dheepam	Kannan	
1977	Murugan Adimai		
1977	Avar Enakke Sontham		Guest Appearance
1977	Unnai Suttrum Ulagam	Sekar	
1977	Indru Pol Endrum Vaazhga	Kumar	
1977	Ilaya Thalaimurai	Pandu	
1977	Madhurageetham		
1977	Sorgam Naragam	Balu	
1977	Thunai Iruppal Meenakshi		
1977	Raghupathi Raghavan Rajaram	Inspector Raghupathi	
1977	Enna Thavam Seithen		
1977	Nandha En Nila		
1977	Aarupushpangal	Raja	
1977	Olimayamana Ethirkaalam		
1978	Meenakshi Kungumam		
1978	Thanga Rangan		
1978	Shankar Salim Simon	Shankar	
1978	Aayiram Jenmangal	Ravi	
1978	Thirukkalyanam		
1978	Varuvan Vadivelan	Vijay	
1978	Mangudi Minor	Lakshman	
1978	Aval Oru Pachai Kuzhandhai		
1978	Ival Oru Seethai		
1978	Vanakkatukuriya Kathaliye	Umashankar	
1978	Rudhra Thaandavam	Ravi	
1978	Alli Darbar		
1978	Iraivan Kodutha Varam	Balu	
1978	Pilot Premnath	Premnath's son	
1978	Sonnadhu Nee Thanaa		
1978	En Kelvikku Enna Bathil		
1978	Karunai Ullam		
1979	Kuppathu Raja	Raja	
1979	Sigappukkal Mookkuthi		
1979	Neeya?	Vijay	
1979	Velum Mayilum Thunai	Sundaresan	
1979	Kavari Maan		
1979	Veettukku Veedu Vasappadi	Jagan	
1979	Velli Ratham		
1979	Mugathil Mugam Paarkalaam		
1979	Needhikku Mun Neeya Naana		
1979	Adukku Malli		
1979	Pagalil Oru Iravu	Vinod	
1979	Azhage Unnai Aarathikkiren	Vasu	
1979	Chellakili		

=== 1980s ===
Year	Film	Role	Notes
1980	Ponnukku Yaar Kaaval		
1980	Kaali	G.K	
1980	Oru Iravu Oru Paravai		
1981	Sathya Sundharam	Madhu	
1981	Savaal	Ranjith	
1981	Kalam Oru Naal Maarum		
1982	Thanikattu Raja	Vasu	
1982	Theerpu		
1982	Nayakkirin Magal		
1982	Thyagi		
1982	Naan Kudithukonde Iruppen		
1982	Oorum Uravum		
1982	Nenjangal	Sekhar	
1982	Mamiyara Marumagala		
1983	Ennai Paar En Azhagai Paar		
1983	Neethibathi	Ramesh	Guest Appearance
1983	Thudikkum Karangal	Balu	
1983	Thai Veedu	Vijay	
1983	Yamirukka Bayamen		
1983	Sattam	Micheal Johny	
1983	Sandhippu	Prem	
1983	Apoorva Sahodarigal		
1985	Chiranjeevi		
1985	Sumangali Kolam		
1985	Unga Veetu Pillai	John	
1985	Raja Rishi	Dharmadevan	
1985	Nermai	Doctor	Guest Appearance
1985	Yemaatrathe Yemaaraathe		
1985	Mounam Kalaikirathu		
1986	Naan Adimai Illai		
1986	Uyire Unakkaga	King Vijayaragunath Boobapathy of Jayanagar Raja	
1986	Viduthalai	Vikram	
1986	Vidinja Kalyanam	Divya's father	
1986	Maaveeran	Joe	
1986	Mounam Kalaikirathu		
1986	Oru Iniya Udhayam	Sekar	
1987	Velundu Vinaiyillai		
1987	Michael Raj		
1988	Agni Natchathiram	Vishwanath	
1988	Puthiya Vaanam	Kocha / Govindan	
1988	En Thamizh En Makkal		
1988	Maduraikara Thambi		
1989	Rajadhi Raja	Raja's father	
1989	Paattukku Oru Thalaivan	M.L.A Marudhanayagam	
1989	Ninaivu Chinnam		
1989	Siva		Guest Appearance
1989	Dravidan		

=== 1990s ===
Year	Film	Role	Notes
1990	Panakkaran	Viswanath	
1990	Chilambu		
1990	Seetha Geetha		
1990	Periya Veetu Pannakkaran		
1990	Kizhakku Vasal		
1990	Velai Kidaichuduchu		
1990	Sirayil Sila Raagangal		
1990	Sathriyan	Selvam's godfather	
1990	Vellaiya Thevan		
1991	Vetri Karangal	Thyagarajan	
1991	Karpoora Mullai	Vinod Shankar	
1991	Adhikari	Inspector Vijayakumar	Guest appearance
1991	Cheran Pandiyan	Periya Gounder	
1991	Vigneshwar	DIG Rajendran	
1991	Archana IAS	Anandamurthy	
1991	Nenjamundu Nermaiyundu		
1991	Iravu Sooriyan		
1991	Idhayam	Geetha's father	
1991	Kizhakku Karai	Ranganathan	
1991	Bramma		
1992	Amaran	Govindan	
1992	Rickshaw Mama	Sivaramakrishnan	
1992	Sugamana Sumaigal	Police Officer	
1992	Sivantha Malar	Prabha's father	
1992	Thanga Manasukkaran	Chellakili's father	
1992	Singaravelan	Velan's father	Cameo appearance
1992	Kasthuri Manjal		
1992	Oor Mariyadhai	Chinna Raja (Guest appearance)	
1992	Pattathu Raani	Sundaram	
1992	Mudhal Kural	Veluthambi	
1992	Suriyan		
1992	Deiva Vaakku	Vallatharai	
1992	Pangali		
1992	Senthamizh Paattu	Rangasamy	
1992	Devar Veettu Ponnu		
1993	Walter Vetrivel	Vetrivel's father	
1993	Rakkayi Koyil	Bommu Nayakar	
1993	Yejaman	Father of Vaitheeswari	
1993	Ezhai Jaathi	Odeyar	
1993	Madurai Meenakshi	Kumarasamy	
1993	Manikuyil	Ratnasabapathy	
1993	Thangakkili		
1993	Uzhaippali	Tamilarasan's brother-in-law	
1993	Parvathi Ennai Paradi	Rajadurai	
1993	Maravan	Manickam	
1993	Gandharvam	IG Ravindran Nair	
1993	Thalattu		
1993	Kizhakku Cheemayile	Maayaandi Thevan	Tamil Nadu State Film Award Special Prize
1993	Kilipetchu Ketkava	Grandfather	
1993	Kattabomman	Ponnurangam	
1993	Senthoorapandi	Senthoorapandi's father	
1994	Rajakumaran	Rajakumaran's father	
1994	Siragadikka Aasai	Balu	
1994	Athiradi Padai	Roja's father	
1994	Aranmanai Kaavalan	Sandanapandian	
1994	Honest Raj	Gopalakrishnan	
1994	Sakthivel	Sakthivel	
1994	Adharmam		
1994	Rasigan	Raghavan	
1994	Sadhu	Master	
1994	Senthamizh Selvan	Vijay Bhoopathy	
1994	Sarigamapadani	Archana's father	
1994	Thai Maaman	Velusamy	
1994	Nattamai	"Periya Nattamai" Dharmalingam	Special appearance
1994	Nila	Vijay	
1994	Thaai Manasu	Thangapandi	
1994	Chinna Pulla	Valliammai's father	
1995	Engirundho Vandhan	Police Commissioner	
1995	Oru Oorla Oru Rajakumari		
1995	Baasha	Rangasamy	
1995	Muthu Kaalai	Sangaiah	
1995	Padikira Vayasula		
1995	Lucky Man		Guest appearance
1995	Thamizhachi	Periyasamy Gounder	
1995	Asuran	DGP Raghupathi	
1995	Raasaiyya	Shyamsunder	
1995	Periya Kudumbam	Thangavelu	
1995	Ilavarasi		
1995	Ilaya Ragam	Vanitha's father	
1996	Parambarai	Paramasivan's father	
1996	Love Birds	Rathnakumar	
1996	Maanbumigu Maanavan	ACP Chandrabose	
1996	Anthimanthaarai	Kandaswamy Iyer	Tamil Nadu State Film Award Special Prize
1996	Poovarasan	Ukrapandi	
1996	Senathipathi	Lingappan Naicker	
1996	Mr. Romeo	DGP Vijayakumar	
1996	Panchalankurichi	Mayandi	
1997	Periya Thambi	Sankarapandian	
1997	Bharathi Kannamma	Vellaisamy Thevar Zamindar	
1997	Periya Idathu Mappillai	Periya Thambi	
1997	Abhimanyu	SI Thangaraj	
1997	Aahaa..!	Parasuraman	
1997	Pudhalvan	Sathyamoorthy	
1998	Kondattam	Purushothaman	
1998	Natpukkaga	Karunakaran	
1998	Thayin Manikodi		
1998	En Aasai Rasave		
1998	Desiya Geetham		
1999	Suryodayam	J. R.	
1999	Suriya Paarvai	Narayanan	
1999	Ponnu Veetukkaran	Indu's father-in-law	
1999	Adutha Kattam		
1999	Chinna Durai		
1999	Anandha Poongatre	Meenakshi's father	
1999	Suyamvaram	Kuselan	
1999	Sangamam	Sivasankaramoorthy	
1999	Poovellam Kettuppar	K. R. Bharathi	
1999	Malabar Police	Inspector General	
1999	Nee Varuvai Ena	Subramani's father	
1999	Jodi	Vengudu	
1999	Mudhalvan	Thenmozhi's father	
1999	Aasaiyil Oru Kaditham	Lakshmi's father	

=== 2000s ===
Year	Film	Role	Notes
2000	Sandhitha Velai	Gurumoorthy	
2000	Kushi	Jennifer's father	
2000	Koodi Vazhnthal Kodi Nanmai	Valluvardasan	
2000	Maayi	Maayi's father	
2001	Aanandham	Viji's father	
2001	Star	Ramanathan	
2001	Veettoda Mappillai	Kandaswamy	
2001	Pandavar Bhoomi	Tamizh's father	
2002	Raajjiyam		
2002	Kadhal Virus	Himself	Cameo appearance
2002	Thulluvadho Ilamai	School Principal	
2002	Ezhumalai	Raghupati Naidu	
2002	Shree	Sankara Iyer	
2002	Youth	Shiva's uncle	
2002	Baba	Chamundeeswari's father	
2002	En Mana Vaanil	Rajarathnam	
2002	Album	Somu	
2002	Villain	ACP	
2003	Aasai Aasaiyai	Ramakrishnan	
2003	Anbu	Karuppaiah	
2003	Saamy	Saamy's father	
2003	Winner	Sakthi's father	
2003	Konji Pesalaam	Amalan	
2004	Kuthu	Guru's father	
2004	Vaanam Vasappadum	Poongkothai's father	
2004	Maanasthan	Pattamaniyar	
2004	Aai	Police Commissioner of Chennai	
2005	Ji	Vasu's father	
2005	Sukran	Home Minister	
2005	London	Rajasekar	
2005	Chandramukhi	Durga's grandfather	
2005	Chinna	Gayathri`s uncle	
2005	Ramakrishna	Village chief	
2005	Gurudeva	Sundar	
2005	Majaa	Chidambaram	
2006	Aathi	Aathi's grandfather	
2006	Kusthi	Abi and Divya's grandfather	
2006	Jambhavan	Velan's foster father	
2006	Dharmapuri	Meiyappan	
2006	Thalaimagan	L. Sathya Moorthy	
2007	Thaamirabharani	Subbaiah	
2007	Deepawali	Mudaliar	
2007	Thirumagan	Malaiswamy	
2007	Kuttrapathirikai	Karthikeyan	
2007	Nam Naadu	Boominathan	
2008	Vaitheeswaran	Mani Shankar	
2008	Kannum Kannum		
2008	Santosh Subramaniam	Rajeswari's father	
2008	Aayutham Seivom	Udhayamoorthy	
2008	Kuselan	Himself	Special appearance
2008	Surya	Surya's father	
2009	1977	DGP Padmanathan	
2009	Malai Malai	Assistant Commissioner of Police	
2009	Solla Solla Inikkum	Sathya's father	
2009	Pokkisham		Special appearance

=== 2010s ===
Year	Film	Role	Notes
2010	Jaggubhai	Jagannathan's father	
2010	Goa	Nattamai	
2010	Maanja Velu	Velu's father	
2010	Singam	Home Minister	
2011	Ponnar Sankar	Periyamalai Gounder	
2011	Kandaen	Vasanth's grandfather	
2011	Konjam Sirippu Konjam Kobam		
2011	Osthe	Minister	
2011	Mambattiyan	Mambattiyan's father	
2013	Chennaiyil Oru Naal	Dr. Arumainayagam	
2013	Singam II	Home Minister	
2014	Chandra	Guruji Parameshwara	
2014	Lingaa	Karunakara's father	
2015	Aambala	Solavandhan	
2015	Sandamarutham		
2015	Paranjothi		
2015	Puli	The Vedhalam King	
2016	Ilamai Oonjal	Home Minister	
2016	Kodi	Chief Minister	
2017	Singam III	Home Minister	
2017	Kuttram 23	Commissioner of Police Kumaraswamy	
2017	Anbanavan Asaradhavan Adangadhavan		Guest appearance
2017	143		
2018	Pei Irukka Illaya		

=== 2020s ===
Year	Film	Role	Notes
2021	Raajavamsam	Kulasekaran	
2022	Oh My Dog	Shanmugam	
2022	Amaichar		325th Film
2022	The Legend	Saravanan's father	
2023	Maamannan	Opposition Chief	
2024	Rathnam	Malliga's grandfather	

=== Telugu films ===
Year	Film	Role	Notes
1989	Geethanjali	Geethanjali's father	
1990	Ghatana		
1990	Lorry Driver	SP Pradeep Kumar	
1991	Sathruvu	Lawyer	
1992	Killer	Bhupathi Raja	
1992	Peddarikam	Balaramudu	
1993	Mogudu Garu		
1994	Bhairava Dweepam	Jayachandra Maharaju	
1996	Sampradayam		
1997	Rukmini	Dorababu	
1998	Auto Driver	Sravani's father	
1999	Sneham Kosam	Peddayya	
1999	Arundhati		
2000	Ravanna		
2001	Kushi	Madhumati's father	
2001	Simharasi		
2001	Adhipathi	Justice Panduranga Rao	
2002	Vasu	Commissioner Rao	
2002	Vooru Manadiraa		
2003	Indiramma	Ananda Rayudu	
2004	Samba	Dharmayya Naidu	
2005	Bhageeratha	Bullabbai	
2006	Seethakoka Chiluka	Lakshmi's father	
2006	Rajababu	Dasaradharamaiah	
2007	Hello Premistara	Arjun's grandfather	
2007	Tulasi	Dasaradha Ramayya	
2008	Kathanayakudu	Himself	Special appearance
2009	Naa Style Veru	Parvathy's father	
2010	Bindaas	Purushottam Naidu	
2011	100% Love	Balu Mahendra	
2012	Srimannarayana	Kalki Narayana Murthy	
2015	Rudhramadevi	Anumakonda Ramudu	
2016	Nenu Sailaja	Sailaja's grandfather	
2016	Sarainodu	Pedhaya	
2016	Janatha Garage	Chief Minister	
2018	Touch Chesi Chudu	Chief Minister	
2019	Prati Roju Pandage	Surya Narayan	
2019	Entha Manchivaadavuraa	Lakshminarayana	
2023	Ravanasura	Ramachandra	
2024	Manamey	Tony	

=== Other language films ===
Year	Film	Role	Language	Notes
1993	Aayirappara	Chettiyar	Malayalam	
1993	Gandharvam	Ravindran Nair	Malayalam	
1997	Lady Commissioner	Hari's father	Kannada	
2010	Appu and Pappu	Appu's grandfather and Deepa's father	Kannada	
2013	Chandra	Guruji Parameshwara	Kannada	Bilingual film
2014	Mr. Fraud	Shekara Varma	Malayalam	

=== As producer ===
- Nenjangal (1982)
- Kai Kodukkum Kai (1984)
- Sinam (2022)

== Television ==
Year	Serial	Role	Channel	Language
1997–2001	Kokila Enge Pogiraal		Sun TV	Tamil
2009–2013	Thangam	Rajaramchandra Raghunath	Sun TV	Tamil
2013–2014	Vamsam	Vetrivel Annachi	Sun TV	Tamil
2016–2017	Talambralu		Gemini TV	Telugu
2017–2018	Nandini	Rajashekar	Sun TV; Udaya TV	Tamil; Kannada
2019	Rasaathi	Shanmugasundaram (Extended Special Appearance)	Sun TV	Tamil
2022	Oru Oorla Rendu Rajakumari	Nattamai (Special Appearance)	Zee Tamil	Tamil
2023; 2024–present	Karthigai Deepam	Raja Sethupathi	Zee Tamil	Tamil
2026–present	Bhairavi		Sun TV	Tamil
