= List of Tamil films of 1978 =

Post-amendment to the Tamil Nadu Entertainments Tax Act 1939 on 1 April 1958, Gross jumped to 140 per cent of Nett Commercial Taxes Department disclosed ₹18.17 crore in entertainment tax revenue for the year.

The following is a list of films produced in the Tamil film industry in India in 1978, in alphabetical order.

== 1978 ==
Title	Director	Production	Music	Cast
Achchani	Devaraj–Mohan	Mahalakshmi Combines	Ilaiyaraaja	R. Muthuraman, Lakshmi, Shoba
Adhirstakaran	Venunath	Soundhara Combines	M. S. Viswanathan	Nagesh, Fatafat Jayalaxmi, V. K. Ramasamy, A. Sakunthala, Sukumari
Agni Pravesam	K. Narayanan	United Combines	M. S. Viswanathan	Srikanth, Padmapriya
Alli Darbar	K. M. Balakrishnan	Aiyaa Creations	Shankar–Ganesh	Vijayakumar, Manjula, Kavitha
Anantha Bairavi	Mohan Gandhiram	Sreevidhya Productions	R. Ramanujam	Ravichandran, K. R. Vijaya, Jayadevi
Andaman Kadhali	V. Srinivasan	Muktha Films	M. S. Viswanathan	Sivaji Ganesan, Sujatha, Chandra Mohan, Kavitha
Annapoorani	Krishnan–Panju	Vijayambika Films	V. Kumar	R. Muthuraman, K. R. Vijaya, Cho
Athaivida Ragasiyam	Kiruba Shankar	Arumugam Enterprises	Shankar–Ganesh	Sivakumar, Fatafat Jayalakshmi, Jai Ganesh, Suma, S. V. Subbaiah
Aval Appadithan	C. Rudraiah	Kumar Arts	Ilaiyaraaja	Kamal Haasan, Sripriya, Rajinikanth
Aval Oru Adhisayam	B. V. Srinivasan	Suchitra Films	Vijaya Bhaskar	Jaishankar, Y. Vijaya
Aval Oru Pachai Kuzhandhai	S. C. Sekhar	Annai Vallankanni Creations	Ilaiyaraaja	Vijayakumar, Bhavani
Aval Thandha Uravu	Durai	M. N. S. Enterprises	M. S. Viswanathan	R. Muthuraman, Sharada, Kavitha
Aayiram Jenmangal	Durai	Pallavi Enterprises	M. S. Viswanathan	Padmapriya, Latha, Vijayakumar, Rajinikanth
Bairavi	M. Bhaskar	Vallivelan Movies	Ilaiyaraaja	Rajinikanth, Sripriya, Geetha
Chittu Kuruvi	Devaraj–Mohan	Sri Vishnupriya Creations	Ilaiyaraaja	Sivakumar, Sumithra, Meera
En Kelvikku Enna Bathil	P. Madhavan	Abhirami Creations	M. S. Viswanathan	Rajinikanth, Vijayakumar, Sripriya, Vijaya Chandrika
Ennai Pol Oruvan	T. R. Ramanna	Sri Vinayaga Pictures	M. S. Viswanathan	Sivaji Ganesan, Sharada, Ushanandini
Ganga Yamuna Kaveri	K. Sornam	Sri Geetha Chitra Productions	M. S. Viswanathan	Jaishankar, Sridevi, Nanditha Bose, Kavitha
General Chakravarthi	D. Yoganand	Vijayavel Films	M. S. Viswanathan	Sivaji Ganesan, K. R. Vijaya, Kavitha
Ilamai Oonjal Aadukirathu	C. V. Sridhar	Sri Chithra Productions	Ilaiyaraaja	Kamal Haasan, Rajinikanth, Jayachitra, Sripriya
Ilaya Rani Rajalakshmi	Madurai Thirumaran	Meenambika Films	M. S. Viswanathan	Jaishankar, Srividya, Sridevi
Iraivan Kodutha Varam	A. Bhimsingh	Raja Cine Arts	M. S. Viswanathan	Rajinikanth, Vijayakumar, Sumithra, Fatafat Jayalaxmi
Iravu 12 Mani	S. Rajendran	B. S. Raj Productions	Shankar–Ganesh	Ravichandran, Rajasree
Ithu Eppadi Irukku	R. Pattabiraman	Vijaya Meena Films	Ilaiyaraaja	Jaishankar, Sridevi, Thengai Srinivasan
Ival Oru Seethai	A. Jagannathan	Welcome Movies	V. Kumar	Vijayakumar, Sumithra, Srikanth, Y. Vijaya, Sathyapriya
Justice Gopinath	D. Yoganand	Vallimanalan Pictures	M. S. Viswanathan	Sivaji Ganesan, K. R. Vijaya, Rajinikanth, Thengai Srinivasan, A. Sakunthala
Kaatrinile Varum Geetham	S. P. Muthuraman	Vijayabhaskar Films	Ilaiyaraaja	R. Muthuraman, Kavitha, Srikanth, Thengai Srinivasan
Kaipidithaval	A. Bhimsingh	Ganeshanjali Productions	Shankar–Ganesh	Sivakumar, Sujatha, Thengai Srinivasan
Kamakshiyin Karunai	K. Narayanan	Anand Productions	Shankar–Ganesh	Srikanth, Manorama
Kannamoochi	R. Pattabiraman	Sri Balambika Productions	V. Kumar	Sivakumar, Latha, Sumithra
Kannan Oru Kai Kuzhandhai	N. Venkatesh	Vivekananda Pictures	Ilaiyaraaja	Sivakumar, Sumithra, Sowcar Janaki, Jai Ganesh, Sathyapriya, Jayamalini
Karate Kamala	K. S. Giri	Alankar Arts	Shankar–Ganesh	Jayamalini, Srikanth
Karunai Ullam	A. Bhimsingh	M. S. V. Movies	Shankar–Ganesh	Srikanth, K. R. Vijaya, Vijayakumar
Kaviraja Kalamegam	G. R. Nathan	T. N. R. Productions	S. M. Subbaiah Naidu	T. M. Soundararajan, Vennira Aadai Nirmala, V. K. Ramasamy, A. Sakunthala, C. R. Vijayakumari
Kizhakke Pogum Rail	Bharathiraja	Sri Amman Creations	Ilaiyaraaja	Sudhakar, Radhika, Goundamani
Kollimalai Kumarigal	K. S. Reddy	Rm Subbaiah	Sathyam - Gopal	Kavitha, Vijayalalitha, Noothan Prasad, Jayamalini, Ramanamoorthy
Kungumam Kathai Solgirathu	K. Shankar	Devakumari Films	M. S. Viswanathan	M. G. C. Sukumar, Fatafat Jayalaxmi, Hema Chaudhary, Padmapriya, Thengai Srinivasan
Maariyamman Thiruvizha	N. Venkatesh	Rajarajeshwari Pictures	Ilaiyaraaja	Sivakumar, Sujatha
Machanai Paatheengala	V. C. Guhanathan	Thirumurugan Enterprises	Chandrabose	Sivakumar, Sumithra, Sridevi
Madhuraiyai Meetta Sundharapandiyan	M. G. Ramachandran	Soleswar Combines	M. S. Viswanathan	M. G. Ramachandran, Latha, Padmapriya
Makkal Kural	U. Rajendran	Thiruthani Pictures	V. Kumar	Jaishankar, Prameela, A. Sakunthala, Thengai Srinivasan
Mangudi Minor	V. C. Guhanathan	S. P. V. Films	Chandrabose	Vijayakumar, Sripriya, Rajinikanth, A. Sakunthala
Manitharil Ithanai Nirangalah!	R. C. Sakthi	V. D. S. Productions	Shyam	Kamal Haasan, Sridevi, Murali Mohan, Sathyapriya
Meenakshi Kungumam	K. Narayanan	Sri Devipriya Films	Shankar–Ganesh	Vijayakumar, Sripriya, Jai Ganesh
Mela Thaalangal	K. Sornam	Ashtalakshmi Pictures	Ramesh Naidu	Jaishankar, Sripriya, Manorama
Mudi Sooda Mannan	R. Vittal	R. V. Films	Satyam	Jaishankar, Sridevi, Y. Vijaya, Deepa, Sarath Babu
Mullum Malarum	Mahendran	Ananthi Films	Ilaiyaraaja	Rajinikanth, Sarath Babu, Fatafat Jayalaxmi, Shoba
Nizhal Nijamagiradhu	K. Balachander	Kalakendra Movies	M. S. Viswanathan	Kamal Haasan, Sumithra, Shoba, Sarath Babu
Oru Nadigai Natakam Parkiral	A. Bhimsingh	Girnar Films	M. S. Viswanathan	Srikanth, Lakshmi, Nagesh
Oru Veedu Oru Ulagam	Durai	Sunitha Cine Arts	M. S. Viswanathan	Srikanth, Shubha, Shoba, Vijaya Babu
Panchamirdham	J. Sasikumar	Yesodha Films	G. Devarajan	Jaishankar, Sangeeta, M. R. Radha
Paruva Mazhai	N. Sankaran Nair	Raghava International	Salil Chowdhury	Kamal Haasan, Zarina Wahab, Meena
Paavathin Sambalam	Durai	G. V. R. Combines	Shankar–Ganesh	R. Muthuraman, Sumithra, Prameela
Per Solla Oru Pillai	Krishnan–Panju	Vani Chithra Productions	Vijaya Bhaskar	R. Muthuraman, Srikanth, C. R. Vijayakumari, Sripriya
Pilot Premnath	A. C. Tirulokchandar	Cine India Productions; D. M. Films	M. S. Viswanathan	Sivaji Ganesan, Malini Fonseka, Vijayakumar, Jai Ganesh, Jayachitra, Sridevi, Thengai Srinivasan
Priya	S. P. Muthuraman	S. P. T. Films	Ilaiyaraaja	Rajinikanth, Sridevi, Ashna, Ambareesh, Thengai Srinivasan
Punniya Boomi	K. Vijayan	N. V. R. Pictures	M. S. Viswanathan	Sivaji Ganesan, Vanisri, Sangeetha, Y. Vijaya, Bhavani
Radhai Ketra Kannan	R. Krishnamurthy	Sri Mookambikai Arts	K. V. Mahadevan	Sivakumar, Srividya, Srilatha
Rajavuketha Rani	L. Balu	Velan Movies	Vijaya Bhaskar	Jaishankar, Sridevi, Srikanth, Sathyapriya
Rudhra Thaandavam	K. Vijayan	Alarmelu Manga Productions	M. S. Viswanathan	Vijayakumar, Sumithra, V. K. Ramasamy, Nagesh, Thengai Srinivasan, Manorama
Sadhurangam	Durai	Chithra Arts	V. Kumar	Rajinikanth, Srikanth, Jayachitra, Prameela, Thengai Srinivasan
Sakka Podu Podu Raja	S. P. Muthuraman	Rathna Movies	Shankar–Ganesh	Jaishankar, Jayachitra, Cho, Manorama
Sattam En Kaiyil	T. N. Balu	Balu Cine Arts	Ilaiyaraaja	Kamal Haasan, Sripriya, Thengai Srinivasan
Seervarisai	K. Sornam	Kay Cee Films	M. S. Viswanathan	R. Muthuraman, Lakshmi, Thengai Srinivasan, Manorama
Shankar Salim Simon	P. Madhavan	Abhirami Movies	M. S. Viswanathan	Vijayakumar, Rajinikanth, Manjula, Latha, Jai Ganesh
Sigappu Rojakkal	Bharathiraja	K. R. G. Productions	Ilaiyaraaja	Kamal Haasan, Sridevi
Sonnadhu Nee Thanaa	C. N. Muthu	Vijaya Raja Pictures	Ilaiyaraaja	Vijayakumar, Sumithra, Thengai Srinivasan, Jai Ganesh
Sri Kanchi Kamakshi	K. S. Gopalakrishnan	Chithra Productions	K. S. Raghunathan	Gemini Ganesan, Sujatha, Srividya, Sripriya, R. Muthuraman, Prameela, Srikanth, Y. Vijaya, Thengai Srinivasan, P. R. Varalakshmi
Taxi Driver	N. S. Maniam	Charu Chitra Films	M. S. Viswanathan	Jaishankar, Sridevi, M. R. Radha, Srikanth
Thai Meethu Sathiyam	R. Thyagarajan	Dhandayudhapani Films	Shankar–Ganesh	Rajinikanth, Sripriya, Major Sundarrajan
Thanga Rangan	S. R. Dakshinamurthy	Jeppiar Pictures	M. S. Viswanathan	Vijayakumar, Shubha, Thengai Srinivasan, Srividya
Thappu Thalangal	K. Balachander	Premalaya Productions	Vijaya Bhaskar	Rajinikanth, Saritha
Thirukkalyanam	K. Chandrabose	Vasanthalaya Pictures	Ilaiyaraaja	Vijayakumar, Srividya, Shubha
Tripura Sundari	K. Chandrabose	Garuda Films	Ilaiyaraaja	Srikanth, Jayaprabha, Manju Bhargavi
Thyagam	K. Vijayan	Sujatha Cine Arts	Ilaiyaraaja	Sivaji Ganesan, Lakshmi, K. Balaji, Thengai Srinivasan, Fatafat Jayalaxmi, Manorama
Ullathil Kuzhanthaiyadi	K. S. Gopalakrishnan	A. C. V. Combines	Shankar–Ganesh	Jaishankar, Sripriya, Thengai Srinivasan
Unakkum Vaazhvu Varum	G. Srinivasan	Ashapriya Productions	V. Kumar	R. Muthuraman, Sripriya
Uravugal Endrum Vaazhga	H. S. Venu	Rajam Enterprises	Shankar–Ganesh	R. Muthuraman, Srividya, Fatafat Jayalaxmi, Major Sundarrajan
Vanakkatukuriya Kathaliye	A. C. Tirulokchandar	Cine Bharath Productions	M. S. Viswanathan	Rajinikanth, Vijayakumar, Sridevi, Jayachitra
Vandikkaran Magan	Amirtham	Poompuhar Productions	M. S. Viswanathan	Jaishankar, M. R. Radha, Jayachitra, Roja Ramani, Manorama, S. A. Ashokan, S. V. Subbaiah
Varuvan Vadivelan	K. Shankar	Subbu Productions	M. S. Viswanathan	R. Muthuraman, Latha, Vijayakumar, Jayachitra, Fatafat Jayalaxmi, Chandrakala, Padmapriya, Jai Ganesh, Nagesh
Vattathukkul Chaduram	S. P. Muthuraman	M. A. M. Films	Ilaiyaraaja	Latha, Sumithra, Srikanth, Sarath Babu
Vayasu Ponnu	K. Shankar	R. G. M. Productions	M. S. Viswanathan	R. Muthuraman, Latha, Roja Ramani, Jai Ganesh, M. N. Nambiar, Thengai Srinivasan
Vaazha Ninaithaal Vaazhalaam	Devaraj–Mohan	Sri Kamakoti Movies	Ilaiyaraaja	Jaishankar, Sripriya, Jayadevi, Thengai Srinivasan
Vazhthungal	C. V. Rajendran	Senthamarai Combines	L. Vaidyanathan	R. Muthuraman, Chandrakala, Pandari Bai
Vetri Thirumagal	H. V. Babu	Vivek Agencies	C. N. Pandurangan	T. R. Mahalingam, Madhuri Devi
