= List of Tamil films of 1976 =

Post-amendment to the Tamil Nadu Entertainments Tax Act 1939 on 1 April 1958, Gross jumped to 140 per cent of Nett Commercial Taxes Department disclosed ₹21.33 crore in entertainment tax revenue for the year.

The following is a list of films produced in the Tamil film industry in India in 1976, in alphabetical order.

== 1976 ==
Title	Director	Production	Music	Cast
Akka	Madurai Thirumaran	Mathura Films	M. S. Viswanathan	K. R. Vijaya, Vijayakumar, Vijayabala, Jai Ganesh, M. N.Rajam, V.K.Ramasamy
Annakili	Devaraj–Mohan	S. P. T. Films	Ilaiyaraaja	Sivakumar, Sujatha, Srikanth, Fatafat Jayalaxmi, Thengai Srinivasan
Asai 60 Naal	Durai	Sri Uma Chitra Productions	V. Kumar	Vijayakumar, Shumitra, Fathafat Jayalakshmi, M.N.Rajam
Athirshtam Azhaikkirathu	A. Jagannathan	J. M. Productions	V. Kumar	Srividya, Thengai Srinivasan, Sowcar Janaki, Major Sundarrajan, Pandari Bai
Bhadrakali	A. C. Tirulokchandar	Cine Bharath Productions	Ilaiyaraaja	Sivakumar, Rani Chandra, Major Sundarrajan, Bhavani, Thengai Srinivasan, Manorama
Chitra Pournami	P. Madhavan	Sri Bhuvaneswari Movies	M. S. Viswanathan	Sivaji Ganesan, Jayalalitha, R. Muthuraman, C. R. Vijayakumari, Jayakumari, Nagesh
Dasavatharam	K. S. Gopalakrishnan	Brilliant Picture Corporation	S. Rajeswara Rao	Ravikumar, Gemini Ganesan, K. R. Vijaya, M. R. Radha, Sowcar Janaki, Jayachitra, Sripriya, Sridevi, Seerkazhi Govindarajan, Major Sundarrajan, Jaya Guhanathan, C. R. Vijayakumari
Etharkkum Thuninthavan	M. Karnan	M. K. R. Pictures	Shankar–Ganesh	Sivakumar, K. S. Jayalakshmi, Thengai Srinivasan, Asogan, Manorama, Sundarrajan
Gruhapravesam	D. Yoganand	Prosperity Pictures	M. S. Viswanathan	Sivaji Ganesan, K. R. Vijaya, Sivakumar, Jaya Guhanathan, A. Sakunthala
Idhaya Malar	Gemini Ganesan	Udhayam Productions	M. S. Viswanathan	Gemini Ganesan, Sowcar Janaki, Kamal Haasan, Sujatha, Vijayakumar
Inspector Manaivi	S. Rajendra Babu	Chamundi Chitra Films	Shankar–Ganesh	R. Muthuraman, Jayachitra, Srikanth, Kumari Padmini
Ithu Ivargalin Kathai	T. P. Arunachalam	Vinu Chitra Arts	V.Kumar	Sivachandran, Amudha
Janaki Sabadham	Avinashi Mani	K. R. G. Pictures	V. Kumar	Ravichandran K. R. Vijaya, Vijayakumar, Vennira Aadai Nirmala Master Sekar, Roja Ramani
Kaalangalil Aval Vasantham	S. P. Muthuraman	Vijaya Bhaskar Films	Vijaya Bhaskar	R. Muthuraman, Srividya, Chandrakala, Thengai Srinivasan
Kanavan Manaivi	A. Bhimsingh	Sri Uma Chithra Combines	V. Kumar	R. Muthuraman, Jayalalitha, Srikanth
Kula Gouravam	Peketi Sivaram	Balan Movies	S. M. Subbaiah Naidu	R. Muthuraman, Jayanthi, Jayasudha, Thengai Srinivasan, Manorama
Kumara Vijayam	A. Jagannathan	Sri Murugalaya Movies	G. Devarajan	Kamal Haasan, Jayachitra, V. K. Ramasamy, Thengai Srinivasan, Sukumari
Lalitha	Valampuri Somanathan	Girnar Films	M. S. Viswanathan	Gemini Ganesan, Kamal Haasan, Sujatha, Pandari Bai, Sukumari
Madhana Maaligai	K. Vijayan	N. V. R. Pictures	M. B. Sreenivasan	Sivakumar, Alka, Srikanth, Prameela, Manorama, Thengai Seenivasan, Suruli Rajan
Maharasi Vazhga	Balamurugan	Vijayambika Films	M. S. Viswanathan	K. R. Vijaya, Jai Ganesh, Jayasudha, Srikanth, Nagesh, Sukumari, Pakoda Kadhar
Manamaara Vazhthungal	G. Subramaniam	Sri Naveenatha International	Shankar–Ganesh	Jai Ganesh, Latha, Major Sundarrajan
Manmadha Leelai	K. Balachander	Kalakendra Movies	M. S. Viswanathan	Kamal Haasan, Aalam, Jaya Prada, Hema Chaudhary, Y. Vijaya
Mayor Meenakshi	Madurai Thirumaran	Abhirami Movies	M. S. Viswanathan	Jaishankar, Vijayakumar, K. R. Vijaya, Cho, Thengai Srinivasan, Manorama
Mittai Mummy	Avinashi Mani	Rasi Productions	V. Kumar	Jaishankar, K. R. Vijaya, A. Sakunthala
Mogam Muppadhu Varusham	S. P. Muthuraman	Swarnambika Productions	Vijaya Bhaskar	Kamal Haasan, Vijayakumar, Sumithra, Sripriya, Fatafat Jayalaxmi
Moondru Mudichu	K. Balachander	R. M. S. Productions	M. S. Viswanathan	Kamal Haasan, Sridevi, Rajinikanth
Mutthana Mutthullavo	R. Vittal	Vijayalakshmi Cine Arts	M. S. Viswanathan	R. Muthuraman, Sujatha, Jai Ganesh, Thengai Srinivasan, Pushpalatha
Nalla Pennmani	A. Jagannathan	S. V. J. Pictures	V. Kumar	R. Muthuraman, Sowcar Janaki, Srividya, Sundararajan, Jaya
Nee Indri Naan Illai	A. C. Tirulokchandar	Thrilok Films	M.S.Viswanathan	Sivakumar, Jayachitra, Sripriya
Nee Oru Maharani	K. Sornam	Suryalaya Combines	Shankar–Ganesh	Jaishankar, Sujatha, Sripriya, Thengai Srinivasan,(Asogan)Manorama
Needhikku Thalaivanangu	P. Neelakantan	Sri Umayambigai Productions	M. S. Viswanathan	M. G. Ramachandran, Latha, Pushpalatha, Roja Ramani, Thengai Srinivasan
Ninaipadhu Niraiverum	S. T. Dhandapani	Thrimoorthy Arts	M. L. Srikanth	Vijayakumar, Rajkokila
Oh Manju	C. V. Sridhar	Chitrodhaya Films	M. S. Viswanathan	Master Sekhar, Kavitha, Thengai Seenivasan, M.N.Rajam, V.S.Ragavan
Oorukku Uzhaippavan	M. Krishnan	Venus Pictures	M. S. Viswanathan	M. G. Ramachandran, Vanisri, Vennira Aadai Nirmala
Ore Thanthai	M. Karnan	Murugu Films	Shankar–Ganesh	Jaishankar, Rajakokila, Major Sundarrajan
Oru Kodiyil Iru Malargal	S. P. Muthuraman	Jai Geetha Productions	M. S. Viswanathan	Jaishankar, Sujatha, Jayamala, Srikanth
Oru Oodhappu Kan Simittugiradhu	S. P. Muthuraman	Ramya Cine Arts	V.Dakshinamurthy	Kamal Haasan, Sujatha, Vijayakumar, Vijayalakshmi, Vijaya Geetha
Paalootti Valartha Kili	Devaraj–Mohan	Arun Prasad Movies	Ilaiyaraaja	Vijayakumar, Sripriya, Major Sundarrajan, Thangavelu, V.S.Ragavan, Manorama
Panakkara Penn	U. Rajendran	Thiruthani Pictures	V. Kumar	Jaishankar, Jayachitra, Thengai Srinivasan, Asogan. Thangavelu
Payanam	Vietnam Veedu Sundaram	Chitralekha Productions	M. S. Viswanathan	Major Sundarrajan, Nagesh, Vijayakumar, Jayachitra, Srikanth, Fatafat Jayalaxmi, Vijaya Chandrika
Perum Pugazhum	V. Srinivasan	Vidhya Movies	M. S. Viswanathan	R. Muthuraman, Sujatha, Sekhar, Sathyapriya
Rojavin Raja	K. Vijayan	N. V. R. Productions	M. S. Viswanathan	Sivaji Ganesan, A.V.M.RajanVanisri, Srikanth Sundarajan Cho
Santhathi	Kaushikan	Ace Arts	M. S. Viswanathan	Sivakumar, Sripriya
Satyam	S. A. Kannan	Sri Shanmugamani Films	K. V. Mahadevan	Sivaji Ganesan, Kamal Haasan, Manjula, Jayachitra, Devika, Nagesh
Thayilla Kuzhandhai	R. Thyagarajan	Dhandayudhapani Films	Shankar–Ganesh	Vijayakumar, A. V. M. Rajan, Jayachitra, Jai Ganesh, Jaya Guhanathan, Thengai Srinivasan, Sukumari, A. Sakunthala
Thunive Thunai	S. P. Muthuraman	P. V. T. Productions	M. S. Viswanathan	Jaishankar, Jayaprabha, Rajasulochana
Unakkaga Naan	C. V. Rajendran	Sujatha Cine Arts	M. S. Viswanathan	Sivaji Ganesan, Gemini Ganesan, Lakshmi, Vennira Aadai Nirmala
Unarchigal	R. C. Sakthi	B. S. Productions	Shyam	Kamal Haasan, Srividya, Kanchana, Chandrakantha
Ungalil Oruthi	Devaraj–Mohan	Alayamman Enterprises	Shankar–Ganesh	Sivakumar, Sujatha, Jai Ganesh(Manohar) (Thangavelu) (Surulirajan)
Unmaiye Un Vilai Enna?	Cho	Mohind Movies	M. S. Viswanathan	R. Muthuraman, Vijayakumar, Srikanth, Padmapriya, A. Sakunthala, Cho, Manorama
Uravadum Nenjam	Devaraj–Mohan	Sri Vishnupriya Creation	Ilaiyaraaja	Sivakumar, Chandrakala
Uththaman	V. B. Rajendra Prasad	Jagapathi Art Pictures	K. V. Mahadevan	Sivaji Ganesan, Manjula, Nagesh
Uzhaikkum Karangal	K. Shankar	Kay Cee Films	M. S. Viswanathan	M. G. Ramachandran, Latha, Bhavani, Nagesh, Thengai Srinivasan
Vanga Sambandhi Vanga	P. Bhanumathi	Sri Meenakshi Films	P. Bhanumathi	Chandra Mohan, P. Bhanumathi
Varaprasadham	K. Narayanan	Cine Chitra Combines	R. Govardhan	Ravichandran, Jayachitra, Vijayakumar
Vayilla Poochi	K. S. Gopalakrishnan	Kalavalli Combines	T. R. Pappa	Jaishankar, Sripriya, Nagesh, Thengai Seenivasan, Sundarrajan, Rajagopal
Vazhvu En Pakkam	Krishnan–Panju	S. S. K. Films	M. S. Viswanathan	R. Muthuraman, Lakshmi, Srikanth
Veeduvarai Uravu	S. K. A. John	Chitra Lalitha	M. S. Viswanathan	Jai Ganesh, Sujatha, Rajasree Thengai Seenivasan, M.R.R.Vasu, Manorama
