= Kamal Haasan filmography =

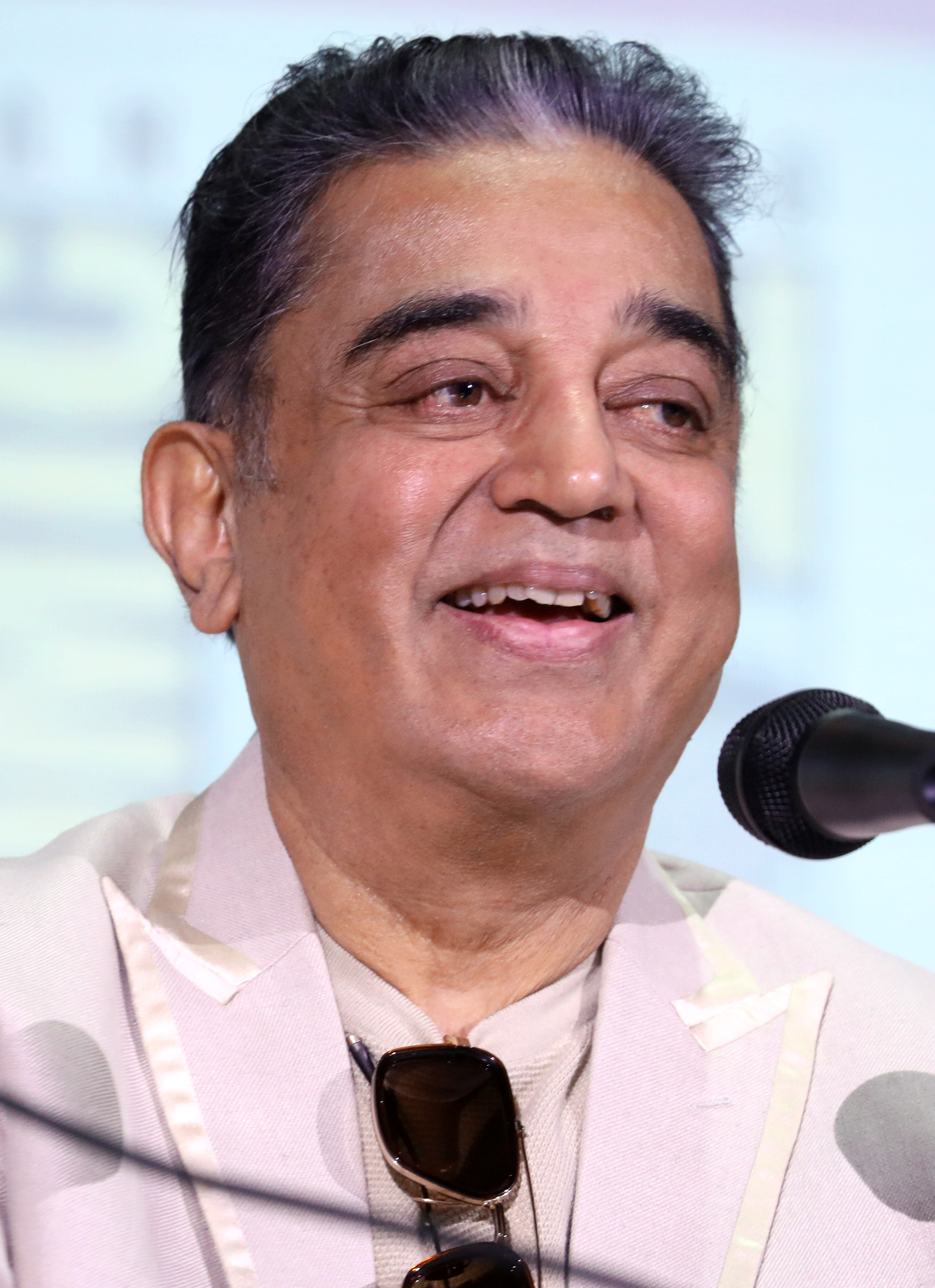
Haasan at San Diego Comic-Con in 2023

Kamal Haasan (Note: In an interview, Haasan revealed that Parthasarathy was one of the names given to him. He was initially named after the Parthasarathy deity at Pallava-era temple in Chennai. Later his father changed his name to Kamal Haasan. His name as per the records of Rajya Sabha is Shri Kamal Haasan.) (born 7 November 1954) is an Indian actor, filmmaker and politician who works primarily in Tamil cinema, and currently serving as a Member of Parliament, Rajya Sabha for Tamil Nadu. He has also worked as an assistant director, choreographer, editor, make-up artist, narrator, television host, and a distributor of films. Haasan has made over 230 films in Tamil, Telugu, Malayalam, Hindi, Kannada and Bengali languages. He has starred in both art-house and blockbuster films.

== As actor ==
List of Kamal Haasan film credits as an actor
Year	Film	Role	Language	Notes	Ref.
1959	Kalathur Kannamma	Selvam	Tamil	Child artist	
1962	Parthal Pasi Theerum	Babu and Kumar	Tamil	Child artist	
1962	Paadha Kaanikkai	Ravi	Tamil	Child artist	
1962	Kannum Karalum	Babu	Malayalam	Child artist	
1963	Vanambadi	Ravi	Tamil	Child artist	
1963	Anandha Jodhi	Balu	Tamil	Child artist	
1970	Maanavan	Student	Tamil	Special appearance in the song "Visiladichan Kunjugala"	
1971	Annai Velankanni	Jesus	Tamil	Cameo	
1972	Prathikaram	Punjabi singer	Malayalam	Special appearance in the song "Madhuram Madhuram"	
1972	Kurathi Magan	Ashok	Tamil		
1973	Arangetram	Thiagu	Tamil		
1973	Sollathaan Ninaikkiren	Kamal	Tamil		
1974	Paruva Kaalam	Chandran	Tamil		
1974	Gumasthavin Magal	Mani	Tamil		
1974	Naan Avanillai	Appu	Tamil	Cameo	
1974	Kanyakumari	Sankaran	Malayalam		
1974	Anbu Thangai	Buddha	Tamil	Special appearance in the song "Mannargal Vanagum"	
1974	Vishnu Vijayam	Vishnu	Malayalam		
1974	Aval Oru Thodar Kathai	Gopal	Tamil		
1974	Panathukkaga	Kumar	Tamil		
1974	Aaina	Prem Kapoor	Hindi	Cameo	
1975	Cinema Paithiyam	Natarajan	Tamil		
1975	Pattampoochi	Siva	Tamil		
1975	Aayirathil Oruthi	Kamal	Tamil		
1975	Then Sindhudhe Vaanam	Ravi	Tamil		
1975	Melnaattu Marumagal	Raja	Tamil		
1975	Thangathile Vairam	Kumar	Tamil		
1975	Pattikkaattu Raja	Mahesh	Tamil		
1975	Njan Ninne Premikkunnu	Suresh	Malayalam		
1975	Maalai Sooda Vaa	Murali	Tamil		
1975	Apoorva Raagangal	Prasanna	Tamil		
1975	Thiruvonam	Prem Kumar	Malayalam		
1975	Mattoru Seetha	Gopi	Malayalam		
1975	Raasaleela	Devan	Malayalam		
1975	Andharangam	Kaanthan	Tamil		
1976	Agni Pushpam	Somu	Malayalam		
1976	Appooppan	Babumon	Malayalam		
1976	Samasya		Malayalam		
1976	Manmadha Leelai	Madhu	Tamil		
1976	Anthuleni Katha	Arun	Telugu	Cameo	
1976	Swimming Pool		Malayalam		
1976	Aruthu		Malayalam		
1976	Satyam	Kumaran	Tamil		
1976	Oru Oodhappu Kan Simittugiradhu	Ravi	Tamil		
1976	Unarchigal	Selvam	Tamil		
1976	Kuttavum Shikshayum		Malayalam		
1976	Kumara Vijayam	Kumar	Tamil		
1976	Idhaya Malar	Mohan	Tamil		
1976	Ponni	Maran	Malayalam		
1976	Nee Ente Lahari		Malayalam		
1976	Moondru Mudichu	Balaji	Tamil		
1976	Mogam Muppadhu Varusham	Ramesh	Tamil		
1976	Lalitha	Balu	Tamil		
1977	Uyarnthavargal	Aarumugam	Tamil		
1977	Siva Thandavum		Malayalam		
1977	Aasheervaadam		Malayalam		
1977	Avargal	Janardhan (Johnny)	Tamil		
1977	Madhura Swapanam		Malayalam		
1977	Sreedevi	Venugopal	Malayalam		
1977	Unnai Suttrum Ulagam	Raja	Tamil		
1977	Kabita	Gopal	Bengali		
1977	Ashtamangalyam		Malayalam		
1977	Nirakudam	Devan	Malayalam		
1977	Ormakal Marikkumo	Chandrasekharan	Malayalam		
1977	16 Vayathinile	Gopalakrishnan (Chappani)	Tamil		
1977	Aadu Puli Attam	Madan	Tamil		
1977	Aanandham Paramaanandham	Babu	Malayalam		
1977	Naam Pirandha Mann	Ranjith	Tamil		
1977	Kokila	Vijaykumar	Kannada	Guest appearance	
1977	Satyavan Savithri	Sathyavan	Malayalam		
1977	Aadhya Paadam		Malayalam		
1978	Madanolsavam	Raju	Malayalam		
1978	Kaathirunna Nimisham	Raju	Malayalam		
1978	Anumodhanam	Rajappan	Malayalam		
1978	Avalude Ravukal	Unknown	Malayalam	Guest appearance	
1978	Nizhal Nijamagiradhu	Sanjeevi	Tamil		
1978	Aval Viswasthayayirunnu	Anto	Malayalam	Guest appearance	
1978	Maro Charitra	Balaji S. a.k.a. Baloo	Telugu		
1978	Ilamai Oonjal Aadukirathu	Prabhu	Tamil		
1978	Amara Prema	Raju	Telugu	Partially reshot, remake of Madanolsavam	
1978	Sattam En Kaiyil	Babu, Rathinam	Tamil		
1978	Padakuthira		Malayalam	Guest appearance	
1978	Vayasu Pilichindi	Raja	Telugu		
1978	Vayanadan Thamban	Vayanadan Thamban	Malayalam		
1978	Sakka Podu Podu Raja	Unknown	Tamil	Guest appearance	
1978	Sigappu Rojakkal	Muthu / Dileep	Tamil		
1978	Manidharil Ithanai Nirangala	Velu	Tamil		
1978	Aval Appadithan	Arun	Tamil		
1978	Thappida Thala	Amrit Lal	Kannada	Guest appearance	
1978	Thappu Thalangal	Amrit Lal	Tamil	Guest appearance	
1978	Yaetta	Ramu	Malayalam		
1979	Sommokadidi Sokokadidi	Rangadu, Shekar	Telugu		
1979	Sigappukkal Mookkuthi		Tamil		
1979	Neeya?	Kamal	Tamil		
1979	Allauddinum Albhutha Vilakkum	Alauddin	Malayalam		
1979	Allaudinaum Arputha Vilakkum	Alauddin	Tamil		
1979	Thaayillamal Naan Illai	Raja	Tamil		
1979	Ninaithale Inikkum	Chandru	Tamil		
1979	Andamaina Anubhavam	Chandru	Telugu		
1979	Idhi Katha Kadhu	Janardhan	Telugu		
1979	Kalyanaraman	Raman, Kalyanam	Tamil		
1979	Nool Veli	Himself	Tamil	Guest appearance	
1979	Guppedu Manasu	Himself	Telugu	Guest appearance	
1979	Mangala Vaathiyam	Santhana Gopalakrishnan Udayar	Tamil		
1979	Neela Malargal	Chandran	Tamil		
1979	Azhiyatha Kolangal	Gowrishankar	Tamil	Cameo	
1979	Pasi	Himself	Tamil	Guest appearance	
1980	Ullasa Paravaigal	Ravi	Tamil		
1980	Natchathiram	Himself	Tamil	Guest appearance	
1980	Guru	Guru	Tamil		
1980	Guru	Guru	Telugu		
1980	Varumayin Niram Sivappu	Rangan	Tamil	Simultaneously filmed in Telugu as Aakali Rajyam	
1980	Maria My Darling	Raghu	Tamil; Kannada	Bilingual film	
1980	Maria My Darling	Raghu	Tamil	Bilingual film	
1980	Saranam Ayyappa		Tamil	Guest appearance	
1981	Aakali Rajyam	J. Ranga Rao	Telugu	Simultaneously filmed in Tamil as Varumayin Niram Sivappu	
1981	Meendum Kokila	Subramaniam	Tamil		
1981	Ram Lakshman	Ram	Tamil		
1981	Raja Paarvai	Raghu	Tamil	100th Film (Note: Raja Paarvai was Haasan's 100th film as an actor, without counting uncredited roles and guest appearances.); Simultaneously filmed in Telugu as Amavasya Chandrudu	
1981	Thillu Mullu	Charu Haasan	Tamil	Guest appearance	
1981	Kadal Meengal	Selvanayagam, Rajan	Tamil		
1981	Ek Duuje Ke Liye	Vasudevan (Vasu)	Hindi		
1981	Savaal	P. P. Raja	Tamil		
1981	Sankarlal	Dharmalingam, Mohan	Tamil	Simultaneously filmed in Telugu as Andagaadu	
1981	Amavasya Chandrudu	Chandram	Telugu	Simultaneously filmed in Tamil as Raja Paarvai	
1981	Tik Tik Tik	Dileep	Tamil		
1981	Ellam Inba Mayyam	Velusamy	Tamil		
1982	Vazhvey Maayam	Rajashekar	Tamil		
1982	Andagaadu	Dharmalingam, Mohan	Telugu	Simultaneously filmed in Tamil as Sankarlal	
1982	Anthiveyilile Ponnu		Malayalam		
1982	Neethi Devan Mayakkam	Military officer	Tamil	Simultaneously shot in Telugu as Edi Dharmam Edi Nyayam? (Guest appearance)	
1982	Moondram Pirai	Srinivasan (Seenu)	Tamil	National Film Award for Best Actor	
1982	Maattuvin Chattangale	Drummer	Malayalam	Special appearance in the song "Maattuvin Chattangale"	
1982	Simla Special	Gopu	Tamil		
1982	Sanam Teri Kasam	Sunil Sharma	Hindi		
1982	Sakalakala Vallavan	Velusamy	Tamil		
1982	Ezham Rathri		Malayalam	Guest appearance	
1982	Rani Theni	Miller	Tamil	Guest appearance	
1982	Yeh To Kamaal Ho Gaya	Ratan Chander, Ajay Saxena	Hindi		
1982	Pagadai Panirendu	Anand	Tamil		
1982	Agni Sakshi	Himself	Tamil	Guest appearance	
1983	Zara Si Zindagi	Rakesh Kumar Shastri	Hindi		
1983	Uruvangal Maralam	Himself	Tamil	Guest appearance	
1983	Sattam	Inspector Raja	Tamil		
1983	Sagara Sangamam	Balakrishna	Telugu		
1983	Sadma	Somu	Hindi		
1983	Poikkal Kudhirai	Himself	Tamil	Guest appearance	
1983	Benkiyalli Aralida Hoovu	Bus conductor	Kannada	Guest appearance	
1983	Thoongathey Thambi Thoongathey	Gopi, Vinoth	Tamil		
1984	Yeh Desh	Inspector Mathur	Hindi		
1984	Ek Nai Paheli	Sandeep	Hindi		
1984	Yaadgar	Rajnath	Hindi		
1984	Raaj Tilak	Suraj	Hindi		
1984	Enakkul Oruvan	Madhan, Upendhra	Tamil		
1984	Karishmaa	Sunny	Hindi		
1985	Oru Kaidhiyin Diary	David, James / Shankar	Tamil		
1985	Kaakki Sattai	Murali	Tamil		
1985	Andha Oru Nimidam	Kumar	Tamil		
1985	Uyarndha Ullam	Anandh	Tamil		
1985	Saagar	Raja	Hindi		
1985	Geraftaar	Kishan Kumar Khanna	Hindi		
1985	Mangamma Sabatham	Ashok, Raja	Tamil		
1985	Japanil Kalyanaraman	Kalyanam, Raman	Tamil		
1985	Dekha Pyar Tumhara	Vishal	Hindi		
1986	Swathi Muthyam	Sivayya	Telugu		
1986	Naanum Oru Thozhilali	Bharath	Tamil	Simultaneously shot in Telugu as Andarikante Ghanudu	
1986	Vikram	Commander Arun Kumar Vikram	Tamil		
1986	Manakanakku	Film director	Tamil	Guest appearance	
1986	Oka Radha Iddaru Krishnulu	Krishna	Telugu		
1986	Punnagai Mannan	Sethu, "Chaplin" Chellappa	Tamil		
1987	Kadhal Parisu	Mohan	Tamil		
1987	Vrutham	Balu	Malayalam		
1987	Kadamai Kanniyam Kattupaadu	Himself	Tamil	Guest appearance	
1987	Per Sollum Pillai	Ramu	Tamil		
1987	Nayakan	Sakthivel Naiker	Tamil	National Film Award for Best Actor	
1987	Pushpaka Vimana	Unemployed graduate	Sound		
1988	Sathyaa	Sathyamurthy (Sathyaa)	Tamil		
1988	Daisy	James	Malayalam		
1988	Soora Samhaaram	ACP Athiveera Pandiyan	Tamil		
1988	Unnal Mudiyum Thambi	Udhayamoorthy	Tamil		
1989	Apoorva Sagodharargal	Sethupathi, Appadurai, Rajadurai	Tamil		
1989	Chanakyan	Johnson	Malayalam		
1989	Vetri Vizha	Vetrivel IPS	Tamil		
1989	Indrudu Chandrudu	G. K. Rayudu, Chandru	Telugu		
1990	My Dear Marthandan	Unnamed Passenger at the railway station	Tamil	Cameo	
1990	Michael Madana Kama Rajan	Michael James, Madhanagopal, Kameshwaran, Subramaniya Rajan	Tamil		
1991	Gunaa	Gunasekharan	Tamil		
1992	Singaravelan	Singaravelan	Tamil		
1992	Thevar Magan	Sakthivel Thevar	Tamil		
1993	Maharasan	Vadivelu	Tamil		
1993	Kalaignan	Indrajith	Tamil		
1994	Mahanadhi	Krishnaswamy	Tamil		
1994	Magalir Mattum	Madhan Kumar	Tamil	Cameo	
1994	Nammavar	V. P. Selvam	Tamil		
1995	Sathi Leelavathi	Dr. Sakthivel Gounder	Tamil		
1995	Subha Sankalpam	Dasu	Telugu		
1995	Kuruthipunal	Adhi Narayanan IPS	Tamil		
1995	Drohi	Adhi Narayan Rao IPS	Telugu		
1996	Indian	Senapathy "Indian" / Chandrabose Senapathy "Chandru"	Tamil	National Film Award for Best Actor	
1996	Avvai Shanmugi	Pandian / Avvai Shanmughi	Tamil		
1997	Chachi 420	Jaiprakash Paswan / Lakshmi Godbhole	Hindi		
1998	Kaathala Kaathala	Ramalingam	Tamil		
2000	Hey Ram	Saket Ram	Tamil		
2000	Hey Ram	Saket Ram	Hindi		
2000	Thenali	Thenali Soman	Tamil		
2001	Aalavandhan	Major Vijay Kumar, Nandha Kumar	Tamil		
2001	Abhay	Major Vijay Kumar, Abhay Kumar	Hindi		
2001	Paarthale Paravasam	Himself	Tamil	Guest appearance	
2002	Pammal K. Sambandam	Pammal Kalyana Sambandham (PKS)	Tamil		
2002	Panchatanthiram	Ramachandramurthy	Tamil		
2003	Anbe Sivam	Nallasivam	Tamil		
2003	Nala Damayanthi	Himself	Tamil	Guest appearance	
2004	Virumaandi	Virumaandi Thevar	Tamil		
2004	Vasool Raja MBBS	Rajaraman (Vasool Raja)	Tamil		
2005	Mumbai Xpress	Avinasi	Tamil		
2005	Mumbai Xpress	Avinash	Hindi		
2005	Rama Shama Bhama	Dr. Shyam Sajjan	Kannada		
2006	Vettaiyaadu Vilaiyaadu	DCP Raghavan IPS	Tamil		
2008	Dasavathaaram	Govindarajan Ramaswamy; Rangarajan Nambi; Balram Naidu; Avatar Singh; Shinghen Narahashi; Christian Fletcher; George W. Bush; Krishnaveni; Vincent Poovaragan; Khalifulla Khan	Tamil		
2009	Unnaipol Oruvan	The anonymous caller	Tamil		
2009	Eenadu	The anonymous caller	Telugu		
2010	Four Friends	Himself	Malayalam	Guest appearance	
2010	Manmadan Ambu	Major Raja Mannar	Tamil		
2013	Vishwaroopam	Wisam Ahmed Kashmiri / Vishwanath	Tamil		
2013	Vishwaroop	Wisam Ahmed Kashmiri / Vishwanath	Hindi		
2015	Uttama Villain	Manoranjan	Tamil		
2015	Papanasam	Suyambulingam	Tamil		
2015	Thoongaa Vanam	C. K. Diwakar	Tamil		
2015	Cheekati Rajyam	C. K. Diwakar	Telugu		
2016	Meen Kuzhambum Mann Paanaiyum	Swami	Tamil	Cameo	
2018	Vishwaroopam II	Wisam Ahmed Kashmiri	Tamil		
2018	Vishwaroop II	Wisam Ahmed Kashmiri	Hindi		
2022	Vikram	Agent Arun Kumar Vikram	Tamil		
2024	Kalki 2898 AD	Supreme Yaskin	Telugu		
2024	Indian 2	Veerasekharan Senapathy "Indian"/ Chandrabose Senapathy "Chandru" / Veerasekharan Balaraman "Bala"	Tamil		
2025	Thug Life	Rangaraya Sakthivel "Sakthi" Nayakar	Tamil		
2027	Indian 3 †	Veerasekharan Senapathy "Indian" / Veerasekharan Balaraman "Bala"	Tamil	Post-production	
2027	Sandiyar †	TBA		Filming	

== As director, producer, and writer ==
List of Kamal Haasan film credits as director, producer, and writer
Year	Title	Language	Credited as			Notes
Year	Title	Language	Director	Producer	Writer	Notes
1980	Guru	Tamil			✓	Credited along with his brothers as "Hasan Brothers"
1981	Meendum Kokila	Tamil			✓	Credited along with his brothers as "Hasan Brothers"
1981	Raja Paarvai	Tamil		✓	✓	Credited along with his brothers as "Hasan Brothers"
1981	Amavasya Chandrudu	Telugu		✓	✓	Credited along with his brothers as "Hasan Brothers"
1986	Vikram	Tamil		✓	✓	
1987	Kadamai Kanniyam Kattupaadu	Tamil		✓		
1988	Sathyaa	Tamil		✓		
1989	Apoorva Sagodharargal	Tamil		✓	✓	
1989	Indrudu Chandrudu	Telugu			Screenplay	
1990	Michael Madana Kama Rajan	Tamil			✓	
1991	Gunaa	Tamil			Dialogue	For the song "Kanmani Anbodu Kadhalan"
1992	Thevar Magan	Tamil		✓	✓	
1994	Mahanadhi	Tamil			✓	
1994	Magalir Mattum	Tamil		✓	✓	
1995	Kuruthipunal	Tamil		✓	✓	
1995	Drohi	Telugu		✓	✓	
1997	Chachi 420	Hindi	✓		✓	
1998	Kaathala Kaathala	Tamil			✓	
2000	Hey Ram	Tamil	✓	✓	✓	
2000	Hey Ram	Hindi	✓	✓	✓	
2001	Aalavandhan	Tamil			✓	
2001	Abhay	Hindi			✓	
2002	Panchatanthiram	Tamil			✓	
2003	Anbe Sivam	Tamil			✓	
2003	Nala Damayanthi	Tamil		✓	✓	
2004	Virumaandi	Tamil	✓	✓	✓	
2005	Mumbai Xpress	Tamil		✓	✓	
2005	Mumbai Xpress	Hindi		✓	✓	
2008	Dasavathaaram	Tamil			✓	
2009	Unnaipol Oruvan	Tamil		✓	✓	
2009	Eenadu	Telugu		✓	✓	
2010	Manmadan Ambu	Tamil			✓	Also lyricist for all songs
2013	Vishwaroopam	Tamil	✓	✓	✓	Also lyricist for two songs
2013	Vishwaroop	Hindi	✓	✓	✓	
2015	Uttama Villain	Tamil		✓	✓	Also lyricist for 5 songs
2015	Thoongaa Vanam	Tamil		✓	✓	
2015	Cheekati Rajyam	Telugu		✓	✓	
2018	Vishwaroopam II	Tamil	✓	✓	✓	
2018	Vishwaroop II	Hindi	✓	✓	✓	
2019	Kadaram Kondan	Tamil		✓		
2022	Vikram	Tamil		✓		
2024	Amaran	Tamil		✓		
2025	Thug Life	Tamil		✓	✓	co-produced and co-written with Mani Ratnam
2027	Seyon †	Tamil		✓		Filming
2027	Dharman †	Tamil		✓		Filming
2027	Sandiyar †	Tamil		✓		Filming

=== As distributor ===
List of Kamal Haasan film credits as distributor
Year	Title	Language	Notes
1986	Hare Radha Hare Krishna	Tamil	Released Tamil dubbed version
1991	Gunaa	Tamil	
1995	Paasavalai	Tamil	Released Tamil dubbed version
1996	Avvai Shanmughi	Tamil	
1998	Kaathala Kaathala	Tamil	
2002	Pammal K. Sambandam	Tamil	
2002	Panchathantiram	Tamil	
2005	Rama Shama Bhama	Kannada	Remake of Sathi Leelavathi
2021	83	Tamil	Released Tamil dubbed version

== Other crew positions ==
List of Kamal Haasan film credits in other crew positions
Year	Title	Language	Position	Ref.
1971	Nootrukku Nooru	Tamil	Assistant director, Assistant choreographer	
1971	Sudarum Sooravaliyum	Tamil	Voice artist; dubbed for Chandramohan	
1971	Savaale Samali	Tamil	Assistant choreographer	
1971	Srimanthudu	Telugu	Assistant choreographer	
1971	Annai Velankanni	Tamil	Assistant director, Assistant choreographer	
1972	Sange Muzhangu	Tamil	Assistant choreographer	
1972	Naan Yen Pirandhen	Tamil	Assistant choreographer (along with Puliyur saroja)	
1972	Nrithasala	Malayalam	Assistant choreographer	
1973	Kasi Yathirai	Tamil	Assistant choreographer	
1973	Suryagandhi	Tamil	Assistant choreographer	
1973	Sollathaan Ninaikkiren	Tamil	Assistant director	
1974	Manyasree Viswamithran	Malayalam	Choreographer	
1974	Vellikizhamai Viratham	Tamil	Assistant choreographer	
1974	Naan Avanillai	Tamil	Assistant choreographer	
1974	Panathukkaga	Tamil	Assistant choreographer	
1974	Aaina	Hindi	Assistant choreographer	
1975	Then Sindhudhe Vaanam	Tamil	Choreographer (The song "Yezhuthatha Paadal")	
1976	Unarchigal	Tamil	Assistant director	
1977	Avargal	Tamil	Choreographer	
1982	Simla Special	Tamil	Choreographer	
1982	Sanam Teri Kasam	Hindi	Choreographer	
1983	Uruvangal Maralam	Tamil	Choreographer	
1988	Rambo III	English	Assistant Make-up artist (worked under Michael Westmore)	
1996	Star Trek: First Contact	English	Assistant Make-up artist (worked under Michael Westmore)	
2000	Hey Ram	Tamil	Choreographer	
2004	Virumaandi	Tamil	Choreographer; Co-Editor	
2006	Aran	Tamil	Narrator for Tamil dubbed version	
2011	Pazhassi Raja	Tamil	Narrator for Tamil dubbed version	
2015	Uttama Villain	Tamil	Choreographer	
2015	Thoongaa Vanam	Tamil	Make-up artist	
2019	Sye Raa Narasimha Reddy	Tamil	Narrator for Tamil dubbed version	
2022	Ponniyin Selvan: I	Tamil	Narrator	
2023	Ponniyin Selvan: II	Tamil	Narrator	
2023	Leo	Tamil	Voice-over cameo	
2024	Manorathangal	Malayalam	Narrator	
2026	Sing Geetham	Tamil	Narrator for the Trailer of the Tamil dubbed version	

== Television ==
=== As a host and guest ===
List of Kamal Haasan television credits as host and guest
Title	Year	Channel	Language	Notes	Ref.
Pattimandram	2014	Jaya TV	Tamil	Debate Title; Ulaganayakanin Uyarvukku Karanam: Kalainayam Mikka Patankala?; Commercial Patankala?	
Jananayakanoppam Ulakanayakanum	2017	Asianet News	Malayalam	Host	
Bigg Boss Tamil	2017–2023	Star Vijay	Tamil	Reality show Host; Seasons 1, 2 3, 4, 5, 6 and 7	
Bigg Boss Malayalam (Season 1)	2018	Asianet	Malayalam	Guest	
Bigg Boss Telugu (Season 2)	2018	Star Maa	Telugu	Guest	
Bigg Boss (Hindi season 13)	2019	Colors TV	Hindi	Guest	
Rockstar	2021	Zee Tamil	Tamil	Guest	
Bigg Boss Ultimate	2022	Star Vijay	Tamil	Reality show Host	
Bigg Boss (Malayalam season 4)	2022	Asianet	Malayalam	Guest	

== Music video appearances ==
List of Kamal Haasan music video appearances
Year	Title	Composer	Role	Performer(s)	Released	Ref.
1988	"Mile Sur Mera Tumhara"		Himself	Various		
1999	"The Blast"	Yuvan Shankar Raja	Playback Singer	Various		
2020	"Arivum Anbum"	Ghibran	Lyricist	Ghibran, Yuvan Shankar Raja, Anirudh Ravichander and eight others	23 April 2020 (video)	

== Documentaries ==
List of Kamal Haasan documentary credits
Year	Title	Language	Role	Director(s)	Notes	Ref.
2018	Amoli	Tamil	Narrator	Jasmine Kaur Roy, Avinash Roy	2019 National Award Winner – Best Investigative Film	

== See also ==
- Kamal Haasan's unrealized projects
- List of awards and nominations received by Kamal Haasan
- Kamal Haasan discography

== Bibliography ==
- K. Hariharan (10 July 2024). Kamal Haasan: A Cinematic Journey (1st ed.). HarperCollins Publishers India. 280 pages. ISBN 9789354899621. "One of the greatest actors India has ever produced, Kamal Haasan is unique in many ways. He has usually gone beyond just enacting a role to completely immersing himself in it."
- Pillai, Swarnavel Eswaran (2015). Madras Studios: Narrative, Genre, and Ideology in Tamil Cinema. SAGE Publications. ISBN 978-93-515-0121-3. Archived from the original on 12 February 2020.
- Rajadhyaksha, Ashish; Willemen, Paul (1998) [1994]. Encyclopaedia of Indian Cinema. Oxford University Press. ISBN 0-19-563579-5.
- Ramachandran, Naman (2012). Rajinikanth: The Definitive Biography. Penguin Books Limited. ISBN 978-81-8475-796-5. Archived from the original on 8 January 2017.
