= Sakka Podu Podu Raja =

Sakka Podu Podu Raja may refer to:

- Sakka Podu Podu Raja (1978 film), an Indian Tamil-language film
- Sakka Podu Podu Raja (2017 film), an Indian Tamil-language action comedy film
