= Adhaivida Ragasiyam =

- Poster
- Directed by: Kiruba Shankar
- Screenplay by: Kadalur Purushothaman
- Story by: Kannadasan
- Produced by: Pollachi Haneefa
- Starring: Sivakumar; Jai Ganesh; Fatafat Jayalaxmi; Suma
- Cinematography: N. A. Thara
- Edited by: Kiruba Shankar
- Music by: Shankar Ganesh
- Production company: Arumugam Enterprises
- Release date: 18 August 1978
- Country: India
- Language: Tamil

Adhaivida Ragasiyam (transl. A bigger secret than that) is a 1978 Indian Tamil-language film directed and edited by Kiruba Shankar. The film stars Sivakumar, Jai Ganesh, Fatafat Jayalaxmi and Suma. It was released on 18 August 1978.

== Cast ==
- Sivakumar
- Jai Ganesh
- Fatafat Jayalaxmi
- Suma
- S. V. Subbaiah
- V. S. Raghavan
- Suruli Rajan
- Jagannath
- Pushpalatha
- Tambaram Lalitha
- C. R. Rajakumari
- Usilai Mani
- Kallapetti Singaram

== Production ==
The film was produced by the son of Sivakumar's uncle Aarumuga Gounder. Sivakumar, who is a skilled painter, also portrayed one in the film.

== Soundtrack ==
The music was composed by Shankar Ganesh, with lyrics by Kannadasan.

Track listing
No.	Title	Singer(s)	Length
1.	"Sengarumbu"	Malaysia Vasudevan, S. Janaki
2.	"Hare Gopala"	P. Susheela
3.	"Mudhalil Vandhaval"	P. Susheela, Vani Jairam
4.	"Enthakkadai Selai"	P. Susheela, Chorus

== Reception ==
P. S. S. of Kalki wrote story, problems, struggle and acting are the elements makes us to watch the film while praising the acting of lead pair, direction and cinematography but panned Surulirajan's comedy.
