= Darsanam =

- Directed by: P. N. Menon
- Written by: P. N. Menon
- Screenplay by: P. N. Menon
- Produced by: P. C. George
- Starring: Adoor Bhasi; Supriya; Sankaradi; Raghavan
- Cinematography: Ashok Kumar
- Edited by: Ravi
- Music by: G. Devarajan
- Production company: Mother India Productions
- Distributed by: Thirumeni Pictures
- Release date: 6 July 1973
- Country: India
- Language: Malayalam

Darsanam is a 1973 Indian Malayalam film, directed by P. N. Menon and produced by P. C. George. The film stars Adoor Bhasi, Supriya, Sankaradi and Raghavan in the lead roles. The film had musical score by G. Devarajan.

== Cast ==
- Adoor Bhasi
- Supriya (Fatafat Jayalaxmi)
- Sankaradi
- Raghavan
- Sasidharan Pillai
- Balan K. Nair
- C. A. Vasantha
- E. P. Balakrishnan
- Junior Geetha
- Junior Raji
- Kottarakkara Sreedharan Nair
- Kuthiravattam Pappu
- Muthu
- Oduvil Unnikrishnan
- P. K. Udayakumar
- Pattambi Subhadra
- Pattambi Thankam
- Pecheri Xavier
- Radhadevi
- Ravi Shankar
- Rexona
- S. K. Palissery
- Santha Devi
- Saraswathi
- Sathyapal
- Roja Ramani
- Sree Narayana Pillai
- Surasu
- Susheela

== Soundtrack ==
The music was composed by G. Devarajan and the lyrics were written by Poonthanam and Vayalar Ramavarma.

No.	Song	Singers	Lyrics	Length (m:ss)
1	"Innaleyolavum"	P. Madhuri, Ambili	Poonthanam	
2	"Peraattin Karayilekkoru"	K. J. Yesudas, Chorus	Vayalar Ramavarma	
3	"Thiruvanchiyooro"	K. J. Yesudas	Vayalar Ramavarma	
4	"Veluppo Kadum Chuvappo"	P. Madhuri	Vayalar Ramavarma	
