= Yarukku Mappillai Yaro =

1975 film by S. P. Muthuraman

- Poster
- Directed by: S. P. Muthuraman
- Written by: Thooyavan
- Produced by: A. Nanjappan
- Starring: Jaishankar; Jayachitra; Srikanth; Fatafat Jayalaxmi
- Cinematography: Babu
- Edited by: R. Vittal
- Music by: Vijaya Bhaskar
- Production company: Uma Chitra Films
- Release date: 7 March 1975
- Running time: 142 minutes
- Country: India
- Language: Tamil

Yarukku Mappillai Yaro (pronounced [jaːrukkːu maːppːiɭɭːaɪ jaːɾoː] transl. Whose groom is who?) is a 1975 Indian Tamil-language comedy film directed by S. P. Muthuraman and written by Thooyavan. The film stars Jaishankar, Jayachitra, Srikanth and Fatafat Jayalaxmi. It was released on 7 March 1975, and became a success. The film served as an inspiration for the 2002 Tamil film Charlie Chaplin.

== Plot ==
Seetharaman and Ramesh are good friends. Seetharaman is married to a possessive woman Meena. Things take a turn when Meena spots Seetharaman with another woman Malathi and Seetharaman lies to Meena that Malathi is Ramesh's lover.

== Cast ==
- Jaishankar as Seetharaman
- Jayachitra as Meena
- Srikanth as Ramesh
- Fatafat Jayalaxmi as Malathi
- V. K. Ramasamy as Major Ramanathan
- S. A. Ashokan
- Suruli Rajan
- Manorama
- A. Sakunthala as Sharmili
- C. K. Saraswathi as Sarasu
- Typist Gopu as Dr. Ramachari
- Lee Kuan Yew as Singapore Prime Minister

== Soundtrack ==
The music was composed by Vijaya Bhaskar.

Track listing
No.	Title	Singer(s)	Length
1.	"Meena Meena"	Vani Jairam, L. R. Anjali
2.	"Muthukkal Sindhi"	S. P. Balasubrahmanyam, P. Susheela
3.	"Naan Oru Thodarkathai"	Vani Jairam
4.	"Naanam Ennadiyo"	T. M. Soundararajan

== Release and reception ==
Yarukku Mappillai Yaro was released on 7 March 1975. Kanthan of Kalki appreciated the cast performances, particularly Jayalaxmi's, Babu's cinematography and Muthuraman's direction. Kumudam also reviewed the film.
