= Theerthayathra =

Theerthayaathra
- Directed by: A. Vincent
- Written by: V. T. Nandakumar
- Screenplay by: V. T. Nandakumar
- Produced by: R. S. Prabhu
- Starring: Madhu; Sharada; Sukumari; Kaviyoor Ponnamma
- Cinematography: A. Venkat
- Edited by: G. Venkittaraman
- Music by: A. T. Ummer
- Production company: Rajesh Films
- Distributed by: Rajesh Films
- Release date: 22 December 1972
- Country: India
- Language: Malayalam

Theerthayaathra is a 1972 Indian Malayalam film, directed by A. Vincent and produced by R. S. Prabhu. The film stars Madhu, Sharada, Sukumari and Kaviyoor Ponnamma in the lead roles. The film had musical score by A. T. Ummer. The movie was also the debut film for Telugu actress Supriya (Jayalakshmi Reddy) as Parvathikkutty.

== Cast ==
- Madhu as Rajagopalan
- Sharada as Savithri/Thaathrikkutty
- Kaviyoor Ponnamma as Kochikkaavu
- Supriya (Fatafat Jayalaxmi) as Parvathikkutty
- Adoor Bhasi as Pavithran Namboothiri
- Philomina as Ammukuttyamma
- Sukumari as Sreekumarikkutty
- Master Sathyajith as Vasu
- Prema as Kunjaathol
- Sankaradi as Krishnan Ashan
- Sudheer as Thankappan, Tile Company Owner
- Abbas as Abdulla
- Metilda
- P. O. Thomas as Bus Driver Kuttappan
- Pala Thankam as Pathumma
- Premji as Thirumeni
- R. K. Nair
- Shantha
- Sreeni
- Sumithra as Nangyarukutty
- Thodupuzha Radhakrishnan as Rajagopalan's friend
- Vijayakala
- Subhadra

== Soundtrack ==
The music was composed by A. T. Ummer and the lyrics were written by P. Bhaskaran.

No.	Song	Singers	Lyrics	Length (m:ss)
1	"Ambike Jagadambike"	P. Madhuri, Kaviyoor Ponnamma, B. Vasantha	P. Bhaskaran	
2	"Anuvadikkoo"	K. J. Yesudas	P. Bhaskaran	
3	"Chandrakkalaadharanu"	P. Susheela	P. Bhaskaran	
4	"Kolloorilum"	P. Susheela	P. Bhaskaran	
5	"Maarivillu Panthalitta"	K. J. Yesudas	P. Bhaskaran	
6	"Theerthayaathra Theerthayaathra"	P. Leela	P. Bhaskaran	
7	"Theerthayaathra Theerthayaathra" (Bit)	P. Jayachandran, Chorus	P. Bhaskaran	
