= Kaali (1980 film) =

1980 film by I. V. Sasi in Tamil

- Poster of Tamil version
- Directed by: I. V. Sasi
- Written by: Mahendran
- Produced by: Hem Nag
- Starring: Rajinikanth; Vijayakumar/Chiranjeevi; Seema; Fatafat Jayalaxmi; Shubha
- Cinematography: Ashok Kumar
- Edited by: K. Narayanan
- Music by: Ilaiyaraaja
- Production company: Hem Nag Productions
- Release dates: 3 July 1980 (Tamil); 19 September 1980 (Telugu)
- Running time: 144 minutes
- Country: India
- Languages: Tamil; Telugu

Kaali is a 1980 Indian action film written by Mahendran and directed by I. V. Sasi. Produced by Hem-Nag, the film stars Rajinikanth, Seema, Fatafat Jayalaxmi and Shubha. The film was simultaneously made in Tamil and Telugu languages, with Chiranjeevi replacing Vijayakumar in Telugu. The cinematography was handled by Ashok Kumar and soundtrack was composed by Ilaiyaraaja. Kaali ran for less than 50 days in Chennai and was considered a box office failure in both Tamil and Telugu. The film is infamous for a fire accident which caused the deaths of some stuntmen and horses.

== Cast ==
Cast (Tamil)	Cast (Telugu)	Role (Tamil)	Role (Telugu)
Rajinikanth		Kaali	Kaali
Vijayakumar	Chiranjeevi	G. K.	G. K.
Seema		Anitha & Geetha	Anitha & Geetha
Fatafat Jayalaxmi		Alangaram	Alangaram
Major Sundarrajan	Kantha Rao	Sampath	Sampath
Manorama		Thayamma	Thayamma
Suruli Rajan		Sokku	Sokku
Shubha		Sampath's wife	Sampath's wife
Vennira Aadai Nirmala		Kaali's sister	Kaali's sister
V. Gopalakrishnan	Giri Babu	Somu	Somu
Kaikala Satyanarayana		Rajaram	Rajarao
Prasad Babu		Rajaram's sons	Rajarao's sons
Sundar Raj		Rajaram's sons	Rajarao's sons
Pushpalatha		Rajaram's wife	Rajarao's wife
Anuradha Sriram		child artist	child artist
Master Haja Sheriff		child artist	child artist

== Production ==
It was reported that Mithun Chakraborty would be featured in the film but proved untrue. During production a fire broke out, killing some stuntmen and horses.

== Soundtrack ==
The music was composed by Ilaiyaraaja. The film had Vairamuthu's first written song, "Kali Bhadrakali".

Tamil tracklist

Song	Singers	Lyrics	Length
"Adi Aadu"	Malaysia Vasudevan	Kannadasan	4:39
"Azhagazhaga"	P. Susheela	Kannadasan	4:46
"Kali Bhadrakali"	S. P. Balasubrahmanyam, S. Janaki	Vairamuthu	4:00
"Thithikkum"	S. P. Balasubrahmanyam, Kalyan, S. P. Sailaja	Kannadasan	4:33
"Vaazhumattum"	S. P. Balasubrahmanyam	Kannadasan	4:46

== Release and reception ==
Kaali was released on 3 July 1980 in Tamil, and 19 September the same year in Telugu clashing with another Chiranjeevi-starrer Thathayya Premaleelalu (1980). Saavi wrote that I. V. Sasi has started taking roots in Tamil. The critic added that the makers have mixed the colour in the cinemascope and added by looking at the title if you guess this film as revenge plot then you have better intelligence than Sasi. Ananda Vikatan rated the film 43 out of 100, criticising its excessive reliance on violence and expressed concern it would inspire real life violence which was already rampant in India. Naagai Dharuman of Anna praised Mahendran's dialogues, Ashok Kumar's cinematography, stunt choreography, Ilayaraja's music, acting of star cast and direction.

== Bibliography ==
- Mahendran (2013) [2004]. சினிமாவும் நானும் [Cinema and I] (in Tamil). Karpagam Publications. OCLC 54777094.
- Ramachandran, Naman (2014) [2012]. Rajinikanth: The Definitive Biography. Penguin Books. ISBN 978-0-14-342111-5.
