= Kungumam Kathai Solgirathu =

- Film poster
- Directed by: K. Shankar
- Written by: R. K. Shanmugam (dialogues)
- Produced by: K. A. Rajabather
- Starring: M. G. C. Sukumar; Fatafat Jayalaxmi; Padmapriya; Jai Ganesh; Hema Chaudhary
- Cinematography: D. V. Rajaram
- Edited by: R. Krishnan; K. Shankar
- Music by: M. S. Viswanathan
- Production company: Devakumari Films
- Release date: 23 December 1978
- Country: India
- Language: Tamil

Kungumam Kathai Solgirathu (transl. Bindi narrates the story) is a 1978 Indian Tamil-language film directed by K. Shankar. The film stars M. G. C. Sukumar, Fatafat Jayalaxmi, Padmapriya, Jai Ganesh and Hema Chaudhary. It is Sukumar's first film as lead actor. The film was released on 23 December 1978 and failed at the box office.

== Cast ==
- M. G. C. Sukumar
- Fatafat Jayalaxmi
- Padmapriya
- Jai Ganesh
- Hema Chaudhary
- M. N. Nambiar
- Pandari Bai

== Production ==
Kungumam Kathai Solgirathu is the first film for Sukumar as lead actor. The film was launched at Vauhini Studios with Nagireddy switching on the camera. On the launch day, the scenes with Sukumar, Nambiar and Pandari Bai were shot there while a song sung by P. Susheela, Vani Jairam and L. R. Eswari was recorded on the same day. The song "Oru Pudhiya Paadagan" was shot at VGP Golden Beach.

== Soundtrack ==
The music was composed by M. S. Viswanathan. "Oru Pudhiya Paadagan", recorded at Vauhini Studios, marked the singing debut of M. G. Chakrapani's son M. C. Balu.

== Release and reception ==
Kungumam Kathai Solgirathu was released on 23 December 1978. Kousigan of Kalki gave the film a negative review, primarily for its story. Naagai Dharuman of Anna praised the acting, music, dialogues and also praised Shankar's direction and for delivering a film with a social message but felt he could have concentrated more on screenplay. The film failed at the box office.
