= Pattikkaattu Raja =

1975 film by K. Shanmugam

- Theatrical release poster
- Directed by: K. Shanmugam
- Written by: K. Shanmugam
- Produced by: N. S. Rajendran
- Starring: Sivakumar; Jayasudha; Kamal Haasan; Fatafat Jayalaxmi; Sripriya
- Cinematography: P. N. Sundaram
- Edited by: M. S. Mani
- Music by: Shankar–Ganesh
- Production company: Ravi Combines
- Release date: 12 July 1975
- Running time: 144 minutes
- Country: India
- Language: Tamil

Pattikkaattu Raja (transl. Village king) is a 1975 Indian Tamil-language film, starring Sivakumar and Jayasudha. Kamal Haasan, Fatafat Jayalaxmi, Sripriya and Thengai Srinivasan play supporting roles with Pandari Bai making a guest appearance. The film was released on 12 July 1975.

== Plot ==
Annasamy is an uneducated villager who wants to marry his cousin Sarasu. She is a college student in the city and his uncle insists on Sarasu's approval before going ahead with the wedding. Annasamy heads to the city to find her and befriends Usha in the process. Together they find Sarasu who secretly married club singer Mahesh and has been abandoned by him. Annasamy is determined to get them reunited but learns that Mahesh is now in love with Meenu. They also learn that Sarasu has a heart ailment that will require expensive surgery and her illness is the reason Mahesh left her. In a bid to earn this money, Annasamy agrees to work for the police by posing as the wanted criminal Raja as the two look exactly alike. Tiger is the head of a large criminal organisation and is looking for an expensive and rare jewel encrusted crown. Raja and Meenu both work for him though both have questionable allegiances. There are several different factions operating to gain the crown and many spies within each. In the midst of this, Raja realises he's being impersonated and convinces everyone he is the real Annasamy. As the characters try to get their hands on the crown, more confusions rise.

== Cast ==
- Sivakumar as Annasamy / Raja
- Jayasudha as Usha
- Kamal Haasan as Mahesh
- Fatafat Jayalaxmi as Sarasu
- Sripriya as Meenu
- Thengai Srinivasan as Meganathan
- Manorama as Alamelu
- S. N. Lakshmi as Thangam
- S. A. Ashokan as Tiger
- Pandari Bai as Maria (Guest Appearance)
- T. K. Bagavathy

== Soundtrack ==
The music was composed by Shankar–Ganesh, with lyrics by Vaali.

Song	Singers
"Kettukadi Chinnakutti"	T. M. Soundararajan, L. R. Eswari
"Ennodu Vanthan"	S. P. Balasubrahmanyam, Vani Jairam
"Unnai Naan Paarthathu"	S. P. Balasubrahmanyam
"Club Dance"	Instrumental
"Kannan Yaaradi"	P. Susheela
"Konjum Kili Vanthathu"	P. Susheela

== Reception ==
.
