= Avar Enakke Sontham =

- Poster
- Directed by: Pattu
- Written by: Panchu Arunachalam
- Starring: Jaishankar; Srividya
- Cinematography: T. S. Vinayagam
- Edited by: B. Kandhasamy
- Music by: Ilaiyaraaja
- Production company: P. A. Productions
- Release date: 10 March 1977
- Running time: 146 minutes
- Country: India
- Language: Tamil

Avar Enakke Sontham (transl. He belongs to me only) is a 1977 Indian Tamil-language drama film directed by Pattu and written by Panchu Arunachalam. The film stars Jaishankar and Srividya.

== Cast ==
- Jaishankar
- Srividya
- Fatafat Jayalaxmi
- Y. Vijaya
- Thengai Srinivasan
- V. K. Ramasamy
- Vijayakumar
- Kuladeivam Rajagopal
- V. Gopalakrishnan
- Typist Gopu

== Soundtrack ==
The soundtrack was composed by Ilaiyaraaja and lyrics were written by Panchu Arunachalam. The song "Devan Thiruchabai" was well received. The song "Surangani" was adapted from the Sri Lankan song of the same name.

Track listing
| No. | Title | Singer(s) | Length |
|---|---|---|---|
| 1. | "Devan Thiruchabai" | Poorani, Indira |
| 2. | "Kuthirayile Naan" | T. M. Soundararajan |
| 3. | "Surangani" | Malaysia Vasudevan, Renuka |
| 4. | "Oru Veedu" | S. P. Balasubrahmanyam |
| 5. | "Kabhi Kabhi" | T. M. Soundararajan |
| 6. | "Thenil Aadum Roja" | P. Susheela |

== Reception ==
Kanthan of Kalki wrote in Panchu Arunachalam's story line, the character's different personalities make us wonder what will happen next. He also praised the performances of cast and added experience speaks for Pattu's direction but felt music was unappealing.
