= Azhage Unnai Aarathikkiren =

1979 film by C. V. Sridhar

- Poster
- Directed by: C. V. Sridhar
- Written by: C. V. Sridhar
- Produced by: B. Bharani Reddy
- Starring: Vijayakumar (Tamil); Srinath (Kannada); Murali Mohan (Telugu); Latha
- Cinematography: Ravindra Kumar Tewary
- Edited by: Balu; Shyam
- Music by: Ilaiyaraaja
- Production company: Sreebarani Chithra Enterprises
- Release date: 16 March 1979
- Running time: 135 minutes
- Country: India
- Languages: Tamil; Kannada; Telugu

Azhage Unnai Aarathikkiren! (transl. Beauty, I adore you!) is a 1979 Indian Tamil-language romance film directed by C. V. Sridhar and produced by B. Bharani Reddy. The Tamil version stars Vijayakumar, Latha and Jai Ganesh. The film was simultaneously shot in Kannada and Telugu as Urvashi Neenu Nanna Preyasi (transl. Urvashi, you are my love) and Urvasi Neeve Naa Preyasi (transl. Urvasi, you are my love) respectively. Latha stars in all three versions. The Kannada version stars Srinath and Ramakrishna while the Telugu version stars Murali Mohan and Sarath Babu. The film was Subhashini's debut in Tamil cinema. It was released on 16 March 1979, and did not perform well at the box office.

== Plot ==
Vani, a middle-class woman, lives with her brother, his wife and their chirpy teenage daughter Vasanthi. Victor, a mechanic, is their family friend. Victor introduces Vasu to Vaani's family when they are looking for a tenant and Vasu moves into the top portion of their house. Vasu is deeply in love with Vani but is disappointed to find that Vani is already romantically involved with Venu. However, Venu turns out to be lecherous and deceitful and he vanishes from Vani's life after being physically intimate with her one night after a party.

In a double blow to Vani, both her brother and his wife are killed in an accident. Vani turns despondent and takes to sleeping pills but recovers with Vasu's assistance and starts taking care of Vasanthi as well. Vasanthi soon falls in love with Vimal (Prakash), son of a rich businessman. To help Vani recover fully, Vasu asks her and Vasanthi to accompany him to Goa where he has been deputed to on duty for a couple of months. While in Goa, Vasu reveals his true feelings for Vani and desires to marry her even after she reveals her past affair with Venu.

Vani asks Vasu for some time to decide, but is thrown into a turmoil when she suddenly encounters Venu in Goa. Venu convinces her that his disappearance was circumstantial and he never intended to deceive her and Vani agrees to get back with him. Vasu, though his hopes have been dashed, wishes her well. However, the conniving two-faced Venu is just lusting over Vasanthi and plans to use Vani to satisfy his quest. What happens next forms the rest of the story.

== Cast ==
Cast (Tamil)	Cast (Telugu)	Cast (Kannada)	Role
Vijayakumar	Murali Mohan	Srinath	Vasu
Latha			Vani
Jai Ganesh	Sarath Babu	Ramakrishna	Venu
Nagesh		Dwarakish	Victor
Prakash			Vimal
Subhashini			Vasanthi
V. S. Raghavan	Gokina Rama Rao	Shivaram	
V. Gopalakrishnan	Raavi Kondala Rao	Seetharam	

== Soundtrack ==
The music was composed by Ilaiyaraaja. The song "En Kalyana Vaibhogam" is set to Madhyamavati raga, and "Kurinji Malarin" is set to Mohanam.

Tamil track list

Song	Singers	Lyrics	Length
"Azhage Unnai"	Jayachandran	Vaali	02:07
"Abhisheka"	S. P. Balasubrahmanyam	Vaali	04:23
"Naane Naana"	Vani Jairam	Vaali	04:26
"En Kalyana"	Vani Jairam	Vaali	03:57
"Kurinji Malaril"	S. P. Balasubrahmanyam, Vani Jairam	Vaali	04:25
"Masthaana"	S. P. Balasubrahmanyam, Vani Jairam, Jayachandran, Jency	Vaali	05:02
"Thanimayil"	Vani Jairam	Vaali	04:21

Kannada track list

Song	Singers
"Innendendu"	Vani Jairam
"Iniya Saniye"	S. P. Balasubrahmanyam, Vani Jairam
"Masthana"	Anand, S. P. Balasubrahmanyam, S. P. Sailaja, Vani Jairam
"Bayasuve"	Vani Jairam
"Yaako Yeno"	Vani Jairam
"Singari Bangari"	S. P. Balasubrahmanyam
"Urvashi Roopasi Neene Nanna Preyasi"	S. P. Balasubrahmanyam

Telugu track list

Song	Singers	Lyrics
"Hey Mastana"	S. P. Balasubrahmanyam, S. P. Sailaja, Vani Jairam, G. Anand	Veturi
"Abhisheka Samayana"		Veturi
"Nenedhaina Kalagannana"	Vani Jairam	Veturi
"Chilipi Vayasu"	S.P. Balasubrahmanyam, Vani Jairam	Veturi
"Ee Srivare Maa Varu Outharata"	Vani Jairam	Veturi
"Cheliya Urvasi Neeve Na Preyasi"		Veturi

== Critical reception ==
Kausikan of Kalki praised the performances of cast, the music and cinematography and concluded he wished that Sridhar would often make viewers relate to youth and beauty like this. Naagai Dharuman of Anna praised Tiwari's cinematography, Ilaiyaraaja's music, acting of cast, Nagesh's humour and Sridhar's direction but felt Sridhar dealt with the same old love triangle concept and looking similar in every film of his while also criticising the abundance of songs.

== Bibliography ==
- Sundararaman (2007) [2005]. Raga Chintamani: A Guide to Carnatic Ragas Through Tamil Film Music (2nd ed.). Pichhamal Chintamani. OCLC 295034757.
