= Anthuleni Katha =

1976 Indian film by K. Balachander

- Poster
- Directed by: K. Balachander
- Written by: K. Balachander; M. S. Perumallu; Acharya Aatreya
- Based on: Aval Oru Thodar Kathai (Tamil)
- Produced by: Rama Arannangal
- Starring: Jaya Prada; Phataphat Jayalaxmi; Rajinikanth; Sripriya
- Cinematography: B. S. Lokanath
- Music by: M. S. Viswanathan
- Production company: Andal Productions
- Release date: 27 February 1976
- Country: India
- Language: Telugu

Anthuleni Katha (transl. Never Ending Story) is a 1976 Indian Telugu-language film directed by K. Balachander, starring Jaya Prada, with Fatafat Jayalaxmi, Rajinikanth and Sripriya in supporting roles. Kamal Haasan played a cameo.

The film is a remake of Balachander's own 1974 Tamil film Aval Oru Thodar Kathai. This is Jaya Prada's first starring role, reprising the role played by Sujatha in the original and is considered to be one of her best films. This was also Rajinikanth's first major role.

== Plot ==
Saritha (Jaya Prada) is a working woman in a poor family. She works hard to support her widowed sister, unmarried sister, blind younger brother, her mother, and her drunkard brother Murthy (Rajinikanth) along with his family. Her father abandons the family and goes on a pilgrimage. Not only does her brother not take responsibilities, but he also creates additional problems for her.

She has a longtime boyfriend, who wants to marry her, but she doesn't because of her commitment to her family. His eyes now wander to Saritha's widowed younger sister (Sripriya), who reciprocates his feelings. Saritha, after reading her boyfriend's love letter to her sister, arranges for them to get married, thus giving up her chance of having a life with him. She eventually accepts a marriage proposal of her boss (Kamal Haasan), when she realises that her brother has become responsible enough to take care of her family. She also helps her distressed friend, played by Phataphat Jayalaksmi to settle in life. She decides to resign from hard work, but could not as the result of the turning point in the climax.

== Cast ==
- Jaya Prada as Saritha
- Rajinikanth as Murthy
- Sripriya as Bharathi
- Phataphat Jayalaxmi as Chandra
- G. V. Narayana Rao as Vikatakavi Gopal
- Prasad Babu as Thilak
- Pradeep Shakthi as Conductor
- M. Jayashree as Saritha’s mother
- Sudha as Sumathi
- Kamal Haasan as Arun Ghosh (Cameo)

== Production ==
Anthuleni Katha was a remake of Tamil film Aval Oru Thodarkathai. Both versions were produced by Rama Arangannal and directed by Balachander. Kamal Haasan and Rajinikanth both made their Telugu cinema acting debut with this film. The former did a cameo of Saritha's boss while Hassan's role from original was reprised by Narayana Rao. Phatapat Jayalakshmi and Sripriya reprised their roles from the original. The indoor scenes were shot at Neptune Studios while the outdoor scenes were shot at Visakhapatnam.

== Soundtrack ==
All songs are penned by Acharya Aatreya and the music was composed by M. S. Viswanathan.

- "Are Emiti Lokam" (picturised on Phaphat Jayalakshmi) - L. R. Eswari
- "Tali Kattu Subhavela" (picturised on Narayana Rao) - S. P. Balasubrahmanyam
- "Kallalo Unnadedo Kannulake Telusu" (picturised on Jayaprada) - S. Janaki
- "Ugutundu Nee Inta Uyyala" (picturised on Jayaprada) - P. Susheela
- "Devude Icchadu Vidhi Okkati" (picturised on Rajinikanth) - Yesudas

== Reception ==
In 2001, Jaya Prada herself acknowledged the impact the film had in her personal life, as she very much related to the lead character.

== Awards ==
Nandi Awards

- Third Best Feature Film - Bronze won by Ram Aranganal (1976)

Filmfare Awards South

- Special Award – Jaya Prada
