= Sreedevi (film) =

- Promotional Poster
- Directed by: N. Sankaran Nair
- Screenplay by: Jagathy N. K. Achary
- Produced by: P. S. Nair
- Starring: Kamal Haasan; Sharada; Jayabharathi
- Cinematography: J. Williams
- Edited by: K. Sankunni
- Music by: G. Devarajan
- Production company: Sri Sarkareswari films
- Distributed by: Ambika Films
- Release date: 25 March 1977
- Country: India
- Language: Malayalam

Sreedevi is a 1977 Indian Malayalam-language film directed by N. Sankaran Nair, starring Kamal Haasan, Sharada, M. G. Soman and Jayabharathi in lead roles.The film has musical score by G. Devarajan. It was remade in Hindi as Rishta Kagaz Ka.

== Cast ==
- Kamal Haasan as Venugopal
- Sharada as Sreedevi (Senior)
- M. G. Soman as Chandrasekharan
- Jayabharathi as Prabha
- Sukumari as Karthyayani
- Jagathy Sreekumar as Phalgunan
- Thikkurissy Sukumaran Nair as Shivasankara Pilla
- Sankaradi as P. K. Menon
- Baby Babitha as Sreedevi (Junior)
- Bahadoor as Sudareshan
- J. A. R. Anand as Broker
- Mallika Sukumaran as Valsala
- Master Raghu as Young Venu
- P. R. Menon as Sreedevi's father
- Pala Thankam as School teacher
- Rajam K. Nair as Pankajakshi
- Master Sunil as Ravi

== Soundtrack ==
Sreedevi

Film score by G. Devarajan
- Released: 1977
- Recorded: 1977
- Genre: Feature film soundtrack
- Language: Malayalam
- Label: EMI
- Producer: G. Devarajan

The music was composed by G. Devarajan and the lyrics were written by Yusufali Kechery and Perumpuzha Gopalakrishnan.

Songs
No.	Title	Lyrics	Singer(s)	Length
1.	"Anjanakanna Vaa Vaa"	Yusufali Kechery	P. Madhuri
2.	"Bhakthajanapriye"	Perumpuzha Gopalakrishnan	P. Susheela
3.	"Nrithyathi Nrithyathi"		P. Leela
4.	"Parameshwari"	Yusufali Kechery	P. Madhuri
5.	"Punchirichal Poonilavudikkum"	Yusufali Kechery	K. J. Yesudas
6.	"Snehadeepam Koluthi"	Yusufali Kechery	P. Madhuri, Chorus
7.	"Vivaaham Swargathil"	Yusufali Kechery	K. J. Yesudas

== Release ==
Sreedevi was released on 25 March 1977, and the final length of the film was 4,128.00 metres (13,543.31 ft).
