= Varuvan Vadivelan =

- Poster
- Directed by: K. Shankar
- Starring: Jai Ganesh; R. Muthuraman; Vijayakumar; Jayachitra; Fatafat Jayalaxmi; Latha; Chandrakala; Padmapriya
- Music by: M. S. Viswanathan
- Production company: Subhu Productions
- Release date: 15 May 1978
- Country: India
- Language: Tamil

Varuvan Vadivelan (transl. Vadivelan will come) is a 1978 Indian Tamil-language devotional film directed by K. Shankar. The film stars Jai Ganesh, R. Muthuraman, Vijayakumar, Jayachitra, Fatafat Jayalaxmi, Latha, Chandrakala and Padmapriya. It was released on 15 May 1978, and won three Tamil Nadu State Film Awards.

== Cast ==
- Jai Ganesh as Baskar
- R. Muthuraman as Doctor, Baskar's Brother
- Vijayakumar as Vijay
- Jayachitra as Sengamalam
- Fatafat Jayalaxmi as Vijay's Wife
- Latha as Uma
- Chandrakala
- Padmapriya
- Bhavani
- Thengai Srinivasan as Alli's Husband
- Manorama as Alli
- V. S. Raghavan as Uma's Father
- M. N. Nambiar as Velagiri, Sengamalam's father
- Nagesh as Vijay's brother
- Baby Sudha as Vadivelan

== Production ==
Latha, by committing herself to this film, was removed from her post as one of secretaries of AIADMK as the film violated atheism, the "cardinal Dravidian principle". Vijayakumar, though also an AIADMK member and self-proclaimed rationalist, also acted in the film but was not removed. The filming was held at Sri Lanka, Singapore and Malaysia.

== Soundtrack ==
The music was composed by M. S. Viswanathan, with lyrics by Kannadasan.

Song	Singers	Length
"Paava Kadaitheruvil"	T. M. Soundararajan, Vani Jairam	05:20
"Neeyndri Yaarumullai"	Vani Jairam, Sirkazhi Govindarajan	04:10
"Varuvan"	Vani Jairam	04:47
"Kadavul Engey"	L. R. Anjali	06:04
"Pattu Maalai"	Sirkazhi Govindarajan, P. Susheela, M. S. Viswanathan, L. R. Eswari, T. M. Soundararajan & Bangalore A. R. Ramani Ammal	09:27
"Ah! Paaru Paaru Paaru"	L. R. Anjali, L. R. Eswari	03:18
"Joyful Singapore"	S. P. Balasubrahmanyam, P. Susheela	03:18

== Reception ==
A writer for London Murasu appreciated the photography in Malaysia and Singapore, along with the depiction of the shrines of Murugan, and the chemistry of Vijayakumar and Jayalaxmi. Varuvan Vadivelan won three Tamil Nadu State Film Awards: Best Child Artist (Baby Sudha), Best Music Director (Viswanathan) and Special Prize for Best Film.
