= Payanam (1976 film) =

- Title card
- Directed by: Vietnam Veedu Sundaram
- Written by: Vietnam Veedu Sundaram
- Produced by: Bombay K. S. Ramakrishnan
- Starring: Vijayakumar; Jayachitra; Srikanth; Fatafat Jayalaxmi
- Cinematography: G. OR. Nathan
- Edited by: R. Devarajan
- Music by: M. S. Viswanathan
- Production company: Majestic Studios
- Distributed by: Chitralekha
- Release date: 15 January 1976
- Running time: 125 minutes
- Country: India
- Language: Tamil

Payanam (transl. Journey) is a 1976 Indian Tamil-language road film, written and directed by Vietnam Veedu Sundaram. The film stars Vijayakumar, Jayachitra, Srikanth and Fatafat Jayalaxmi, with Major Sundarrajan, Thengai Srinivasan, Suruli Rajan and Master Sekhar in supporting roles. It was released on 15 January 1976.

== Cast ==
- Vijayakumar as Captain Murali
- Jayachitra as Chithra
- Srikanth as Babu
- Fatafat Jayalaxmi as Jaya
- Major Sundarrajan as Train Master Sivasamy
- Nagesh as Ambi
- Suruli Rajan as Balu
- Thengai Srinivasan as Train Passenger
- Master Sekhar as Sekhar
- V. R. Thilagam as Jaya & Murali's mother
- Sukumari as Nun
- Vijayachandrika as Bhavani
- Neelu as Bhavani's Husband
- Senthamarai as Prisoner
- Kuladeviam Rajagopal as Train Passenger
- "Thilagam" Narayanasami as Train Passenger
- Manavaalan as Train Passenger
- "Sakthi" Sukumar as Train Passenger
- Master Radhakrishnan as Train Passenger

== Soundtrack ==
Music was composed by M. S. Viswanathan and lyrics were written by Kannadasan.

| Song | Singer | Length |
|---|---|---|
| "Payanam Payanam" – Title | M. S. Viswanathan | 04:02 |
| "Thendralukku Endru" | S. P. Balasubrahmanyam | 03:06 |
| "Aramba Kalam" | K. J. Yesudas, Vani Jairam | 04:34 |
| "Nattukku Kaval" | S. P. Balasubrahmanyam, Saibaba | |
| "Vellai Vanthathada" | T. M. Soundararajan, Sirkazhi Govindarajan | |
| "Payanam" – Sad | M. S. Viswanathan | |

== Reception ==
Kanthan of Kalki praised the film for good story and for completely shooting in train while also appreciating the performances of actors and direction but felt the inclusion of stunt scenes were unnecessary.
