= Fatafat Jayalaxmi =

Indian actress (1958-1980)

'Fatafat' Jayalaxmi
- Jayalaxmi in a film
- Born: Neerajakshi Reddy; 1 November 1958; Andhra Pradesh, India
- Died: 21 November 1980 (aged 22); Madras (now Chennai), Tamil Nadu, India
- Spouse: Sukumaran
- Relatives: Papanasam Sivan (aunt-in-law's uncle); V. N. Janaki (aunt-in-law); M. G. Chakrapani (uncle-in-law); M. G. Ramachandran (uncle-in-law)

Neerajakshi Reddy, better known as Fatafat Jayalakshmi (1 November 1958 – 21 November 1980), was an Indian actress active mainly in Tamil and Telugu films. In Malayalam movies she was known as Supriya. She acted in about 66 movies in Tamil, Telugu, Malayalam and Kannada within a decade of her career.

== Career ==
She made her debut in 1972 in Telugu movie Iddaru Ammayilu which has Akkineni Nageswara Rao in lead role. Same year she appeared in A. Vincent's Malayalam movie Theerthayathra with screen name Supriya, followed by Ithu Manushyano? in 1973. In 1974 she made her Tamil debut in K Balachander's film Aval Oru Thodar Kathai credited as Jayalakshmi. She became a household name with her popular dialogue ‘Fatafat’ (meaning quickly) which became her prefix. Her notable films include Aval Oru Thodar Kathai, Anthuleni Katha, Aarilirunthu Arubathu Varai and Mullum Malarum. She had co-starred with top actors like Rajinikanth, Kamal Haasan, Krishna, NTR and Chiranjeevi.

== Personal life ==
Jayalakshmi was born in 1958 to writer and assistant director Dasaratha Rami Reddy.

She was married to Sukumaran, a nephew of M. G. Ramachandran. She committed suicide by hanging in 1980.

== Partial filmography ==
=== Tamil ===
1. Aval Oru Thodar Kathai (1974) - Debut film in Tamil as Chandra
2. Ezhaikkum Kaalam Varum (1975)
3. Mayangukiral Oru Maadhu (1975)
4. Yarukku Maappillai Yaro (1975)
5. Pattikkaattu Raja (1975)
6. Mogam Muppadhu Varusham (1976)
7. Payanam (1976) as Jaya
8. Annakili (1976) as Sumathi
9. Naam Pirandha Mann (1977)
10. Nandha En Nila (1977)
11. Pennai Solli Kutramillai (1977)
12. Perumaikkuriyaval (1977) as Bhama
13. Punniyam Seithaval (1977) as Kalpana
14. Sorgam Naragam (1977) as Jayalakshmi
15. Avar Enakke Sontham (1977)
16. Kavikuyil (1977)
17. Athaivida Ragasiyam (1978)
18. Iraivan Kodutha Varam (1978)
19. Sakka Podu Podu Raja (1978)
20. Kamatchiyin Karunai (1978)
21. Varuvan Vadivelan (1978) as Vijay's wife
22. Mullum Malarum (1978) as Manga
23. Kungumam Kathai Solgirathu (1978)
24. Thyagam (1978)
25. Uravugal Endrum Vaazhga (1979)
26. Aarilirunthu Arubathu Varai (1979)
27. Kizhakkum Merkum Sandhikkindrana (1979)
28. Kaali (1980)
29. Nadhiyai Thedi Vandha Kadal (1980)
30. Thiruppangal (1981)
31. Yamirukka Bayamen (1983) - Released posthumously

=== Telugu ===
1. Iddaru Ammayilu (1972) - Debut film in Telugu
2. Abhimaanavanthulu (1973)
3. Jeevitha Rangam (1974)
4. Swargam Narakam (1975)
5. Jyothi (1976) - Sashirekha
6. Anthuleni Katha (1976)
7. Bhale Alludu (1977)
8. Eenati Bandham Yenatido (1977)
9. Rama Chiluka (1978)
10. Chilipi Krishnudu (1978) - Aasa
11. Yuga Purushudu (1978) - Rosy
12. Korikale Gurralaite (1979)
13. Muttaiduva (1979)
14. Jathara (1980)
15. Ram Robert Rahim (1980)
16. Kaali (1980)
17. Potharillu (1980)
18. Nyayam Kavali (1981) - Jayalaxmi (Suresh's wife)
19. Tirugu Leni Manishi (1981) - Padma
20. Maa Intayana Katha (1982) - Posthumously dedicated

=== Malayalam : Credited as Supriya ===
1. Theerthayathra (1972) as Parvathy - Debut film in Malayalam
2. Ithu Manushyano? (1973)
3. Darsanam (1973)
4. Sreedevi (1977)
5. Prathyaksha Daivam (1978)

=== Kannada ===
1. Ondu Hennu Aaru Kannu (1980)
