= Akka (film) =

1976 film

- Title card
- Directed by: Madurai Thirumaran
- Produced by: R. S. Somanathan; Madurai Narayanan
- Starring: K. R. Vijaya; Vijayakumar; Jai Ganesh
- Cinematography: N. S. Varma
- Edited by: S. P. S. Veerappa
- Music by: M. S. Viswanathan
- Production company: Mathura Films
- Release date: 22 October 1976
- Country: India
- Language: Tamil

Akka (transl. Elder sister) is a 1976 Indian Tamil-language thriller film, directed by Madurai Thirumaran. The film stars K. R. Vijaya, Vijayakumar, Vijayabala and Jai Ganesh. It was released on 22 October 1976.

== Cast ==
- K. R. Vijaya
- Vijayakumar
- Jai Ganesh
- Vijayabala
- R. S. Manohar
- Thengai Srinivasan
- V. K. Ramasamy
- M. N. Rajam
- Manorama
- Suruli Rajan
- V. S. Raghavan

== Production ==
A sequence depicting Vijaya as a musician was shot at AVM Studios, Madras.

== Soundtrack ==
The soundtrack was composed by M. S. Viswanathan, with lyrics by Kannadasan.

Song	Singers
"Eppadi Vaazhndhanaro"	Vani Jairam
"Kannan Koil Paravai Idhu"	Vani Jairam
"Vennilave"	Vani Jairam
"Malai Malar Pandhalitta Megam"	S. P. Balasubrahmanyam, Vani Jairam

== Critical reception ==
Kanthan of Kalki praised the performances of the cast but felt the film did not have the best cinematography while appreciating the director for maintaining the thrills and suspense throughout the film.
