= Aval Oru Thodar Kathai =

1974 film by K. Balachander

- Theatrical release poster
- Directed by: K. Balachander
- Screenplay by: K. Balachander
- Story by: M. S. Perumal
- Produced by: Rama Arangannal
- Starring: Sujatha
- Cinematography: B. S. Lokanath
- Edited by: N. R. Kittu
- Music by: M. S. Viswanathan
- Production company: Aandal Movies
- Release date: 13 November 1974
- Running time: 162 minutes
- Country: India
- Language: Tamil

Aval Oru Thodar Kathai (transl. She is a never-ending story) is a 1974 Indian Tamil-language drama film written and directed by K. Balachander. The lead role was played by Sujatha in her first Tamil film, which was also her first starring role. Kamal Haasan, Vijayakumar, Jai Ganesh, M. G. Soman and Sripriya play key roles. The story revolves around a working middle-class woman, who sacrifices her desires to support her large family.

The film is considered to be one of Balachander's as well as Sujatha's best films. It had a theatrical run of 25 weeks, and was remade in three other Indian languages.

== Plot ==
Kavitha is the sole breadwinner of her family comprising her mother, widowed sister Bharati, an unmarried younger sister, a blind younger brother, a drunkard elder brother Murthy, his wife and children. Her father had abandoned the family and become a sadhu. Conscious of her family responsibilities, Kavitha keeps postponing her marriage to her long-time boyfriend Tilak indefinitely. Kavitha's friend Chandra takes life easy and keeps changing boyfriends. Tilak, who patiently waits for Kavitha, meets Bharati, pities her and slowly becomes passionate about her. On learning this, Kavitha sacrifices her love and gets them married. Murthy changes his wayward behaviour, becomes responsible and works as a bearer at a restaurant. An impressed Kavitha accepts him as the head of the family. Kavitha's boss Arun Ghosh offers to marry her, but Kavitha does not give a positive reply.

Chandra dates Chandrasekhar, a womaniser and colleague of Kavitha, despite her warnings. Earlier, when Chandrasekhar had written a love letter to Kavitha, she had complained about it to her boss, who then reprimanded Chandrasekhar. Hence, Kavitha does not approve of Chandra's relationship with him. A lustful Chandrasekhar also dates Chandra's widowed mother; on learning this, Chandra attempts suicide. Kavitha and her co-tenant Gopal save Chandra and advise her to marry Gopal. In turn, Chandra advises Kavitha to marry Ghosh. Kavitha accepts the marriage proposal as she now feels confident about Murthy taking care of the family.

On the day of the wedding, Murthy's wife asks him to get back the silver lamp pledged by him earlier, to be gifted to Kavitha for her wedding. While returning to the wedding hall, he seeks a lift from Chandrasekhar, not knowing him. Murthy realises that Chandrasekhar is actually coming to stop the marriage of Kavitha and Chandra when Chandrasekhar states that he had affairs with both of them. Murthy pleads with him not to come to the marriage hall and create any confusion, but Chandrasekhar refuses. A scuffle ensues in which Murthy is killed by Chandrasekhar using the lamp before the police arrest Chandrasekhar. When the marriage is about to take place, Kavitha learns from the police of her brother's death. She then convinces Ghosh to accept her younger sister as the bride as she needs to support her family again. At the same time, Chandra marries Gopal. Kavitha returns to taking care of her family like before.

== Cast ==
- Sujatha as Kavitha
- Jayalaxmi as Chandra
- Jai Ganesh as Murthy
- Soman as R. Chandrasekar
- Kamal Haasan as Gopal
- Vijayakumar as Tilak
- Leelavathi as Parvathi (Kavitha's mother)
- Sripriya as Bharati
- Gokulnath as Arun Ghosh
- Reena as Sumathi
- Thideer Kannaiah as the bus conductor
- Rajesh as a petitioner (uncredited)

== Production ==
When Rama Arangannal read a story written by M. S. Perumal in the magazine Kalaimagal, he requested K. Balachander to explore the possibilities of making it into a film. Balachander decided to make a film on it after being impressed by the characterisation of Kavitha; the film was Aval Oru Thodar Kathai. It is the second in Balachander's trilogy of films where the lead "has to make sacrifices and take care of her family", succeeding Arangetram (1973) and preceding Manathil Urudhi Vendum (1987).

Balachander saw the Malayalam film Ernakulam Junction (1971), where Sujatha played the lead and decided that she would play the lead role. Despite not being fluent in Tamil at the time, she accepted the offer. The film marked Sujatha's Tamil debut. Balachander introduced Jayalaxmi in Aval Oru Thodar Kathai and the sobriquet "Fatafat" she got after she frequently used the word in this film. Vijayakumar was chosen to pair with Sujatha after another actor who was previously chosen struggled to act. Actors Jai Ganesh, Thideer Kannaiah, and Rajesh also made their debuts with this film. Sripriya was in the ninth grade when approached for her role. Kamal Haasan learnt mimicry for his role. The film began production in April 1974 at Newtone Studios. The song "Kadavul Amaithu Vaitha Medai" was shot at a community hall situated at Nandanam, Chennai. The full floor set resembling a middle-class home was built at Newton Studios.

== Soundtrack ==
The soundtrack was composed by M. S. Viswanathan, with lyrics by Kannadasan. For the song "Kadavul Amaithu Vaitha Medai", Viswanathan wanted only human voices to mimic the sounds of objects and animals. R. Srinivasan, a mimicry artist produced the sound of anklets after Viswanathan rejected a proposal to use actual anklets. For the Malayalam-dubbed version Aval Oru Thudarkadha (1975), all lyrics were written by Vayalar Ramavarma.

Tamil
No.	Title	Singers	Length
1.	"Adi Ennadi Ulagam"	L. R. Eswari
2.	"Kadavul Amaithu Vaitha Medai"	S. P. Balasubrahmanyam, Pattom Sadan, Saibaba, R. Srinivasan
3.	"Kannilae Enna Undu"	S. Janaki
4.	"Dheivam Thantha Veedu"	K. J. Yesudas
5.	"Aadumadi Thottil"	P. Susheela

All lyrics are written by Vayalar Ramavarma.

Malayalam
No.	Title	Singers	Length
1.	"Edi Enthedi"	L. R. Eswari
2.	"Kalabhachuvaru Vecha Meda"	P. Jayachandran, Pattom Sadan
3.	"Kannile"	S. Janaki
4.	"Daivam Thanna Veedu"	K. J. Yesudas
5.	"Aadumadi"	P. Susheela

== Reception ==
The film was both a critical and commercial success. Balachander won the Filmfare Award for Best Director – Tamil. Kutty Krishnan of Kalki praised Balachander for showing bold harsh realities without being preachy while also praising him for making newcomers enact like experienced actors and concluded it's not a film that can be easily dismissed by just saying "Fatafat" (marvellous).

== Remakes ==
Aval Oru Thodhar Kathai was remade in Telugu as Anthuleni Katha (1976), also directed by Balachander. The same tunes were used in the remake. Sripriya and Jayalaxmi reprised their roles, while Haasan portrayed a different role. The film was then remade in Hindi as Jeevan Dhaara in 1982. In 1983, Balachander directed the Kannada remake Benkiyalli Aralida Hoovu, where Haasan played the guest role of a bus conductor.

== Legacy ==
The film is considered a classic and cult film. The Times of India named it one "of the landmark movies in the history of Tamil cinema". 30 years after the film's release, directors Mani Ratnam, K. Bhagyaraj and K. S. Ravikumar named Aval Oru Thodar Kathai as one of their favourite films. Mani Ratnam said, "K.Balachandar has done some of the best films before and after Aval Oru Thodar Kathai. But I choose it mainly for its storyline. It is not the plot or the story, but the character that carries the film through". Ravikumar stated, "Through his script and direction, Balachandar brings out the tender core of his middle-class heroine, assailed by problems, in Aval Oru Thodarkathai." In 2011, after Balachander had been given the Dadasaheb Phalke Award, Rediff named it one of Balachander's best and wrote, "Aval Oru Thodarkadhai was one of his path-breaking works. Sujatha took on the mantle of Kavitha, the hard-working woman who struggles to support her largely ungrateful family. The tough exterior conceals a heart of gold, which, tragically, is never seen or recognised by her family. The film made waves not just for its principal characters who challenged Tamil cinema's set notions; it was also the dialogues that drew gasps from the audience. In creating Kavitha, K Balachander gave life to one of Tamil's most enduring, powerful female characters". The Hindu wrote, "Aval Oru Thodarkadhai is a film that will stay with you forever – the invincible heroine was a big draw. And with AOT, Sujatha arrived! As the eldest daughter, who bears the onus of supporting a large family, she came up with a memorable performance. Her matter-of-fact approach to life was very fresh for Tamil audiences, who sang paeans to KB's creative stroke".

== In popular culture ==
The song "Deivam Thantha" was parodied by Vivek in Parthiban Kanavu (2003). Although the song sequence in the film featured Jai Ganesh as the character singing, it is often associated with Rajinikanth, who played Murthy in the Telugu remake Anthuleni Katha, and acted in the sequence of the same song in Telugu. Thus, Vivek is seen mimicking Rajinikanth's iconic cigarette-flicking mannerism during his parody.

Clips from Aval Oru Thodarkathai were screened along with clips from other films such as Server Sundaram (1964), Iru Kodugal (1969), Arangetram, Avargal (1977) and Azhagan (1991) at a function held in Balachander's honour at Tiruchirappalli in January 2015, a month after his death.

== See also ==
- Kokhono Megh Kokhono Brishti, a 2003 Bangladeshi remake

== Bibliography ==
- Dhananjayan, G. (2011). The Best of Tamil Cinema, 1931 to 2010: 1931–1976. Galatta Media. OCLC 733724281.
