= Iraivan Kodutha Varam =

1978 film by A. Bhimsingh

- Theatrical release poster
- Directed by: A. Bhimsingh
- Written by: R. Balakrishnan
- Starring: Vijayakumar; Rajinikanth; Srikanth; Cho Ramaswamy; Sumithra; Fatafat Jayalaxmi
- Cinematography: G. Vittalrao
- Edited by: A. Paul Duraisingam
- Music by: M. S. Viswanathan
- Production company: Raja Cine Arts
- Release date: 22 September 1978
- Running time: 118 minutes
- Country: India
- Language: Tamil

Iraivan Kodutha Varam (transl. The boon given by god) is a 1978 Indian Tamil language film directed by A. Bhimsingh. The film stars Vijayakumar, Rajinikanth, Srikanth, Cho Ramaswamy, Sumithra and Fatafat Jayalaxmi. It was released on 22 September 1978.

== Cast ==
- Vijayakumar as Balu
- Rajinikanth as Rajnikanth
- Srikanth as Ramu
- Cho Ramaswamy as Raja
- Sumithra as Parimala
- Fatafat Jayalaxmi as Geetha
- M. Bhanumathi
- S. N. Lakshmi as Ramu's mother
- Sundari Bai
- Peeli Sivam as Gopal
- Veeraraghavan as Geetha's father
- Oru Viral Krishna Rao as Rao

== Soundtrack ==
All songs were written by Kannadasan & vaali and composed by M. S. Viswanathan.

Title	Singer(s)	Length
"Vellai Kalai Uduthu"	M. S. Viswanathan	3:58
"Aanantham Tharum Raganga"	Vani Jairam	4:25
"Ada Raja Payale"	T. M. Soundararajan	3:28
"Mangal Endral"	Jolly Abraham	4:00

== Reception ==
P. S. M. of Kalki appreciated the performances of star cast. Anna newspaper praised the acting of star cast and stated the story that should have had a nice ending have been unnecessarily dragged out.
