= Vanakkatukuriya Kathaliye =

- Theatrical release poster
- Directed by: A. C. Tirulokchandar
- Written by: Aaroor Dass (dialogues)
- Based on: Vanakkatukuriya Kathaliye by Rajendrakumar
- Produced by: A. C. Tirulokchandar
- Starring: Rajinikanth; Vijayakumar; Jai Ganesh; Sridevi; Jayachitra
- Cinematography: T. S. Vinayagam
- Edited by: B. Kanthasamy
- Music by: M. S. Viswanathan
- Production company: Cine Bharath
- Release date: 14 July 1978
- Running time: 127 minutes
- Country: India
- Language: Tamil

Vanakkatukuriya Kathaliye (transl. Oh Lover Who is Deserving of Greetings) is a 1978 Indian Tamil-language film directed by A. C. Tirulokchandar. The film stars Rajinikanth, Vijayakumar, Jai Ganesh, Sridevi and Jayachitra. Based on the novel of the same name by Rajendrakumar, it revolves around a woman who has the ability to predict the future events. The film was released on 14 July 1978.

== Cast ==
- Rajinikanth as Joe
- Vijayakumar as Umashankar
- Jai Ganesh as Senthil
- Sridevi as Shanti and Jenny
- Jayachitra as Deepa
- S. V. Subbaiah as Sangaralingam
- S. A. Ashokan as Thomas Alva
- Thengai Srinivasan as Sevanthi's husband
- A. R. S as Doctor
- M. R. R. Vasu
- Oru Viral Krishna Rao
- Veeraraghavan as Doctor
- K. Natraj as Doctor
- K. K. Soundar as Ramu
- Manorama as Sevanthi
- S. N. Parvathy as Umashankar's mother

== Soundtrack ==
All songs were written by Vaali and composed by M. S. Viswanathan.

Title	Singer(s)	Length
"Swing Swing Unadhu"	P. Jayachandran, Vani Jairam	4:34
"Adiyenai Paramma"	Jolly Abraham, B. S. Sasirekha	4:04
"Kottu Kottu"	L. R. Eswari, S. P. Balasubrahmanyam	3:48
"Vinnagi Mannagi"	Sirkazhi Govindarajan	4:40

== Release and reception ==
Vanakkatukuriya Kathaliye was released on 14 July 1978. P. S. M. of Kalki felt writer Rajendra Kumar in the name of knitting suspenseful twists has totally confused it but praised the music and cinematography. Naagai Dharuman of Anna praised the acting of the cast, and noted the film was satisfying in first half but then ? and cited Tirulokchander's direction and Aarur Das's dialogues makes it watchable.

== Legacy ==
The film had an introductory song to mark Rajinikanth's entry, a trend that would soon catch on in with his later films.
