= Varaprasadham =

- Theatrical release poster
- Directed by: K. Narayanan
- Screenplay by: K. Narayanan
- Story by: K. S. Mathangan
- Produced by: Raghu; Kasthuri; Narasimman
- Starring: Ravichandran; Jayachitra; Vijayakumar; M. N. Rajam
- Cinematography: Dasaradha Ramaiah; Laxman Corey
- Edited by: K. Narayanan
- Music by: R. Govardhanam (songs); Ilaiyaraaja (score)
- Production company: Cine Chithra Combines
- Release date: 13 April 1976
- Running time: 147 minutes
- Country: India
- Language: Tamil

Varaprasadham (transl. Boon) is 1976 Indian Tamil-language drama film, directed by K. Narayanan. The screenplay was written by him, and the story by K. S. Mathangan. The film stars Ravichandran, Jayachitra, Vijayakumar and M. N. Rajam, with Major Sundarrajan, S. A. Ashokan Manorama and Suruli Rajan in supporting roles. It was released on 13 April 1976.

== Cast ==
- Ravichandran
- Jayachitra
- M. N. Rajam
- Vijayakumar
- Major Sundarrajan
- S. A. Ashokan
- Manorama
- Suruli Rajan
- A. Sakunthala
- K. Kannan
- S. Rama Rao
- Jayachandran

== Production ==
The film began production in August 1975 at Bharani Studios.

== Soundtrack ==
The songs were composed by R. Govardhanam. Ilaiyaraaja did the background score for this film, marking it his first background score in films.

Songs	Singers	Lyric	Length
"Gangai Nathiyoram"	K. J. Yesudas, Vani Jairam		04:25
"Oh Darling"	Vani Jairam	Valampuri John	05:00
"Engirunthu Paarthalum"	T. M. Soundararajan	Pulamai Pithan	04:14
"Puthu Rojavin"	T. M. Soundararajan, P. Susheela	Pulamai Pithan	04:45

== Reception ==
Navamani praised the acting, dialogues and direction. A critic from Free India called it "yet another mediocre film" and praised Asokan for standing out in the role of the judge.
