= Sonnadhu Nee Thanaa =

- Directed by: C. N. Muthu
- Written by: C. N. Muthu
- Produced by: M. S. Chellappan
- Starring: Vijayakumar; Sumithra; Jai Ganesh; Thengai Srinivasan
- Cinematography: D. D. Prasad
- Edited by: M. Vellaichamy
- Music by: Ilaiyaraaja
- Production company: Vijaya Raja Pictures
- Release date: 30 November 1978
- Country: India
- Language: Tamil

Sonnadhu Nee Thanaa (transl. Did you say so?) is a 1978 Indian Tamil-language film written and directed by C. N. Muthu, starring Vijayakumar, Sumithra and Jai Ganesh. It was released on 30 November 1978.

== Cast ==
- Vijayakumar
- Sumithra
- Jai Ganesh
- Thengai Srinivasan

== Production ==
The filming was done at Eramanaickenpatti, a village at Dindigul.

== Soundtrack ==
Ilaiyaraaja scored the music.

Song title	Singers	Lyricist
"Alangara Ponnoonjal"	Malaysia Vasudevan	C. N. Muthu
"Yaengum Deivam"	Vani Jayaram	Pulamaipithan
"Velli Nila"	P. Jayachandran	Pulamaipithan

== Critical reception ==
Kausigan of Kalki explaining the plots and characters and their designs concluded if anyone understood what was there in the film can ask the film's producer and director.
