= Thanga Rangan =

- Theatrical release poster
- Directed by: S. R. Dakshinamurthy
- Written by: S. R. Dakshinamurthy
- Starring: Thengai Srinivasan; Vijayakumar; Srividya
- Edited by: R. Devarajan
- Music by: M. S. Viswanathan
- Production company: Jeppiyar Pictures
- Release date: 30 October 1978
- Running time: 134 minutes
- Country: India
- Language: Tamil

Thanga Rangan is a 1978 Indian Tamil-language film written and directed by S. R. Dakshinamurthy. The film stars Thengai Srinivasan, Vijayakumar and Srividya. It was released on 30 October 1978.

== Plot ==
Rangan is a rickshaw puller and his brother-in-law Kesavulu molests his lover.

== Cast ==
- Thengai Srinivasan as Rangan
- Vijayakumar
- Srividya as Ponnamma
- Kannan as Kesavulu
- Shubha
- Prameela
- K. Samarasam

== Production ==
The scene where Kesavulu challenges Rangan to meet him was shot at Paramount Garden. A scene between Srinivasan and Srividya was shot at Vauhini Studios.

== Soundtrack ==
The soundtrack was composed by M. S. Viswanathan.

Track listing
| No. | Title | Lyrics | Singer(s) | Length |
|---|---|---|---|---|
| 1. | "Irattai Ilai" | Na. Kamarasan | T. M. Soundararajan, P. Susheela |
| 2. | "Thupariya Porom" | Muthulingam | Kovai Soundararajan, T. K. Kala, N. Surendar |
| 3. | "Udhadugalil" | Na. Kamarasan | P. Susheela, P. Jayachandran |
| 4. | "Engarangan Thangarangan" | Kannadasan | T. M. Soundararajan, T. K. Kala, Chorus |

== Release and reception ==
Thanga Rangan was released on 30 October 1978, Diwali day. P. S. M. of Kalki said the film could be watched for the performances of Srinivasan and Srividya. Ananda Vikatan rated the film 39 out of 100, criticising its predictability. Naagai Dharuman of Anna praised the acting, cinematography, art and music.
