= Sakka Podu Podu Raja (1978 film) =

- Poster
- Directed by: S. P. Muthuraman
- Written by: Panchu Arunachalam
- Produced by: P. S. Pandian
- Starring: Jaishankar; Jayachitra
- Cinematography: Babu
- Edited by: R. Vittal; N. Damodaran
- Music by: Shankar–Ganesh
- Production company: KB Films
- Release date: 15 September 1978
- Running time: 132 minutes
- Country: India
- Language: Tamil

Sakka Podu Podu Raja is a 1978 Indian Tamil-language film directed by S. P. Muthuraman, starring Jaishankar and Jayachitra. Kamal Haasan and Fatafat Jayalaxmi played guest roles. The film, released on 15 September 1978, was a hit at the box office.

== Plot ==
The story revolves around Raja (Jaishankar), a playful and carefree young man who lives a simple life with his mother (Manorama). Raja is known for his quick wit and ability to solve problems with his unique brand of humor. He frequently clashes with the strict and arrogant Zamindar (Cho Ramaswamy) of the village, leading to hilarious situations.

Raja falls in love with Rani (Jayachitra), the beautiful and intelligent daughter of a wealthy businessman (S.A. Ashokan). However, Rani's father is opposed to the relationship due to Raja's social status. Undeterred, Raja sets out to win Rani's affections while also challenging the Zamindar's authority.

The film features several comedic scenes and slapstick humor, showcasing Raja's ability to outsmart the Zamindar and his henchmen. The dynamic between Raja and his mother is another highlight, filled with playful banter and heartwarming moments.

As the story progresses, Raja uncovers a conspiracy by the Zamindar to exploit the villagers. He exposes the truth and rallies the villagers to fight for their rights.

Through his wit, courage, and unwavering love for Rani, Raja ultimately overcomes all obstacles and triumphs over the Zamindar. He wins the hearts of the villagers and lives happily ever after with Rani.

== Cast ==
- Jaishankar as Raja
- Jayachitra as Rani
- Kamal Haasan – Special appearance
- Fatafat Jayalaxmi – Special appearance
- Manorama
- Cho Ramaswamy
- Major Sundarrajan
- S. A. Ashokan
- Srikanth
- Thengai Srinivasan
- K. A. Thangavelu
- Vennira Aadai Moorthy
- Suruli Rajan
- Shanmugasundari

== Soundtrack ==
The music was composed by Shankar–Ganesh. The lyrics were written by Kannadasan and Panju Arunachalam .

Track listing
No.	Title	Singer(s)	Length
1.	"Kulirkalam Nadhiyoram"	P. Susheela
2.	"Manikka Ther Ondru"	T. M. Soundararajan, P. Susheela
3.	"Paayum Pulli Maanin"	Vani Jairam
