= Jai Ganesh =

Indian actor

- Born: Aarumugam; 1946
- Died: 12 February 2001 (aged 54); Chennai, Tamil Nadu, India
- Years active: 1974–2000
- Spouse: Paapathi Ammal
- Children: 3

Jai Ganesh (1946 – 12 February 2001) was an Indian actor who appeared in Tamil plays and films. He had supporting roles in the films Aval Oru Thodar Kathai and Aattukara Alamelu, among others. His most popular roles have been as a supporting actor or as a villain in films such as Thaayillamal Naan Illai (1979) and Athisaya Piravi (1990). He acted as a child artiste in films like Sampoorna Ramayanam and Missiamma.

Jai Ganesh was born as Aarumugam, sixth son to Kuppusamy and Chellamma.

He was reintroduced into the film industry by director K. Balachander in Aval Oru Thodar Kathai. From then on, he acted in many films as hero and also as character actor. Some of his famous films in 1970s are Neeya, Pilot Premnath, Vattathukkul Sathuram and Vanakathukuriya Kathaliyae& Azhage unnai Aradhikkiren.

== Death ==
Jai Ganesh died of cancer on 12 February 2001, at the age of 54.

== Notable filmography ==
- Aval Oru Thodar Kathai (1974)
- Thennangkeetru (1975)
- Veeduvarai Uravu (1976)
- Akka (1976)
- Maharasi Vazhga (1976)
- Manamaara Vazhthungal (1976)
- Mutthana Mutthullavo (1976)
- Ungalil Oruthi (1976)
- Annan Oru Koyil (1977)
- Aattukara Alamelu (1977)
- Pattina Pravesam (1977)
- Bala Paritchai (1977)
- Athaivida Ragasiyam (1978)
- Shankar Salim Simon (1978)
- Meenakshi Kungumam (1978)
- Pilot Premnath (1978)
- Sonnadhu Nee Thanaa (1978)
- Vayasu Ponnu (1978)
- Kungumam Kathai Solgirathu (1978)
- Varuvan Vadivelan (1978)
- Kannan Oru Kai Kuzhandhai (1978)
- Vanakkatukuriya Kathaliye (1978)
- Neeya? (1979)
- Anbe Sangeetha (1979)
- Lakshmi (1979)
- Mambazhathu Vandu (1979)
- Pappathi (1979)
- Suprabadham (1979)
- Devathai (1979)
- Thirisoolam (1979)
- Velum Mayilum Thunai (1979)
- Thevaigal (1979)
- Naan Vazhavaippen (1979)
- Thaayillamal Naan Illai (1979)
- Gnana Kuzhandhai (1979)
- Imayam (1979)
- Azhage Unnai Aarathikkiren (1979)
- Geetha Oru Shenbagapoo (1980)
- Ratha Paasam (1980)
- Muzhu Nilavu (1980)
- Ore Mutham (1980)
- Oru Marathu Paravaigal (1980)
- Mangala Nayagi (1980)
- Sorgathin Thirappu Vizha (1981)
- Sathya Sundharam (1981)
- Lorry Driver Rajakannu (1981)
- Thiruppangal (1981)
- Erattai Manithan (1982)
- Nayakkirin Magal (1982)
- Thambathyam Oru Sangeetham (1982)
- Thaai Mookaambikai (1982)
- Vaa Kanna Vaa (1982)
- Aval Oru Kaviyam (1983)
- Yamirukka Bayamen (1983)
- Villiyanur Matha (1983)
- Chiranjeevi (1984)
- Nalla Naal (1984)
- Chinna Veedu (1985)
- Samaya Purathale Satchi (1985)
- Aagaya Thamaraigal (1985)
- Nambinar Keduvathillai (1986)
- Dharma Devathai (1986)
- Thazhuvatha Kaigal (1986)
- Melmaruvathur Arpudhangal (1986)
- Velundu Vinaiyillai (1987)
- Veeran Veluthambi (1987)
- Enga Ooru Pattukaran (1987)
- Enga Chinna Rasa (1987)
- Per Sollum Pillai (1987)
- Manithan (1987)
- Anbulla Appa (1987)
- Kavithai Paada Neramillai (1987)
- Thaye Neeye Thunai (1987)
- Thaimel Aanai (1988)
- Kai Koduppal Karpagambal (1988)
- Puthiya Vaanam (1988)
- Kunguma Kodu (1988)
- Thambi Thanga Kambi (1988)
- Thenpandi Seemayile (1989)
- Uzhaithu Vaazha Vendum (1988)
- Sigappu Thali (1988)
- Annanagar Mudhal Theru (1988) as Inspector Rajagopal
- Raja Chinna Roja (1989)
- Pen Puthi Mun Puthi (1989)
- Thendral Sudum (1989)
- Kai Veesamma Kai Veesu (1989)
- Dravidan (1989)
- Naalaiya Manithan (1989)
- Vaai Kozhuppu (1989)
- Meenakshi Thiruvilayadal (1989)
- Thalaippu Seithigal (1989)
- Aararo Aariraro (1989)
- Ponnu Pakka Poren (1989)
- Athisaya Piravi (1990)
- Mounam Sammadham (1990)
- Kalyana Rasi (1990)
- Arangetra Velai (1990)
- Thalattu Padava (1990)
- Ulagam Pirandhadhu Enakkaga (1990)
- En Veedu En Kanavar (1990)
- Namma Ooru Poovatha (1990)
- Urudhi Mozhi (1990)
- Vaazhkai Chakkaram (1990)
- Sathya Vaakku (1990)
- Thangamana Thangachi (1991)
- Vetri Padigal (1991)
- Mahamayee (1991)
- Ayul Kaithi (1991)
- Apoorva Naagam (1991)
- Nattukku Oru Nallavan (1991)
- Nallathai Naadu Kekum (1991)
- Naalaiya Theerpu (1992)
- Brahmachari (1992)
- Solaiyamma (1992)
- Naalaya Seidhi (1992)
- Innisai Mazhai (1992)
- Periya Gounder Ponnu (1992)
- Mudhal Kural (1992)
- Maharasan (1993)
- Muthupandi (1993)
- Rajadhi Raja Raja Kulothunga Raja Marthanda Raja Gambeera Kathavaraya Krishna Kamarajan (1993)
- Rasa Magan (1994)
- Sakthivel (1994)
- Seeman (1994)
- Watchman Vadivel (1994)
- Nila (1994)
- Veluchami (1995)
- Thai Thangai Paasam (1995)
- Murai Maman (1995)
- Poove Unakkaga (1996)
- Meendum Savithri (1996)
- Neti Savithri (1996; Telugu)
- Maanbumigu Maanavan (1996)
- Vetri Vinayagar (1996)
- Thuraimugam (1996)
- Andha Naal (1996)
- Ullathai Allitha (1996)
- Suryavamsam (1997)
- Adimai Changili (1997)
- Udhavikku Varalaamaa (1998)
- Kodukulu (1998; Telugu)
- Swarnamukhi (1998)
- Thulli Thirintha Kaalam (1998)
- Iniyavale (1998)
- Priyamudan (1998)
- Nilaave Vaa (1998)
- Pudhumai Pithan (1998)
- Unnai Thedi (1999)
- Ullathai Killathe (1999)
- Viralukketha Veekkam (1999)
- Rojavanam (1999)
- Malabar Police (1999)
- Nee Varuvai Ena (1999)
- Anbulla Kadhalukku (1999)
- Unakkaga Ellam Unakkaga (1999)
- Unnaruge Naan Irundhal (1999)
- Manam Virumbuthe Unnai (1999)
- Mugavaree (2000)
- Unnai Kann Theduthey (2000)
- Maayi (2000)
- Alli Arjuna (2002) (delayed release)
- Ennai Thalatta Varuvala (2003) (delayed release)

== Notable Television Works ==
- 1999 Kasalavu Nesam as Rathi's Father
- 2000 Jannal-Marabu Kavithaigal (Cameo Appearance)
