= Mogam Muppadhu Varusham =

1976 film by S. P. Muthuraman

- Poster
- Directed by: S. P. Muthuraman
- Screenplay by: Mahendran
- Based on: Mogam Muppadhu Varusham by Maniyan
- Produced by: M. Shanthi Narayanan
- Starring: Kamal Haasan
- Cinematography: Babu
- Edited by: R. Vittal; N. Damodaran
- Music by: Vijaya Bhaskar
- Production company: Sornambika Productions
- Release date: 27 November 1976
- Running time: 118 minutes
- Country: India
- Language: Tamil

Mogam Muppadhu Varusham (transl. Thirty years of admiration) is a 1976 Indian Tamil-language film directed by S. P. Muthuraman and written by Mahendran. The film stars Kamal Haasan, Vijayakumar, Sumithra, Fatafat Jayalaxmi and Sripriya. It is based on the novel of the same name, written by Maniyan and serialised in the magazine Ananda Vikatan. The film was released on 27 November 1976, and became a commercial success.

== Plot ==
Ramesh, a city bred man is married to Kasthuri, a village girl. On the other hand, Ravishankar, a village lad and Menaka, a modern woman are married. Menaka hates living with Ravishankar as he does not show interest in sex life. Meanwhile, Bhama, a young girl wants at least to have a child with Ramesh, and is attracted by him even if he does not marry her. The film ends with these people overcoming all their issues and living happily, except Bhama, who commits suicide.

== Cast ==
- Kamal Haasan as Ramesh
- Vijayakumar as Ravishankar
- Major Sundarrajan
- Sumithra as Kasthuri
- Sukumari as Kamala
- Fatafat Jayalaxmi as Menaka
- Sripriya as Bama
- Manorama as Raji
- Kathadi Ramamurthy as Shankaran
- Peeli Sivam as Vimala's Husband
- S. N. Lakshmi as Kasthuri's Mami
- S. R. Veeraraghavan as Krishnamurthy

== Production ==
Mogam Muppadhu Varusham is based on the novel of the same name, written by Maniyan and serialised in the magazine Ananda Vikatan. The screenplay for the film adaptation was written by Mahendran. The film was produced under the production banner Swarnambika Productions and shot in black-and-white. It was given an "A" (adults only) certificate by the Central Board of Film Certification with no cuts. The final length of the film was 3,975.20 metres (13,042.0 ft).

== Soundtrack ==
The music was composed by Vijaya Bhaskar.

Title	Singer(s)	Lyrics
"Enathu Vazhkai Paathaiyil"	K. J. Yesudas	Kannadasan
"Sangeetham Ragangal"	S. P. Balasubrahmanyam	Pulamaipithan
"Irubadhu Vayadhennum"	Vani Jairam	
"Mogam Muppadhu Varusham"	P. Susheela	

== Release and reception ==
Mogam Muppadhu Varusham was released on 27 November 1976, and became a commercial success. Kanthan of Kalki appreciated the director for properly adapting the source material to the screen, and the dialogues.

== Bibliography ==
- Mahendran (2013) [2004]. சினிமாவும் நானும் [Cinema and I] (in Tamil). Karpagam Publications. OCLC 54777094.
- Ramachandran, Naman (2014) [2012]. Rajinikanth: The Definitive Biography. New Delhi: Penguin Books. ISBN 978-0-14-342111-5.
