= Panathukkaga =

- Poster
- Directed by: M. S. Senthil
- Screenplay by: Aaroor Dass
- Story by: N. Govindan Kutty
- Produced by: M. S. Senthil
- Starring: Sivakumar; Jayachitra; Sasikumar; Kamal Haasan; Sripriya
- Cinematography: M. R. Ravindran
- Edited by: T. R. Nadarajan
- Music by: M. S. Viswanathan
- Production company: Vetrivel Productions
- Release date: 6 December 1974
- Country: India
- Language: Tamil

Panathukkaga (transl. For money) is a 1974 Indian Tamil-language film produced and directed by M. S. Senthil. It stars Sivakumar. Jayachitra, Sripriya, Sasikumar, Kamal Haasan and Thengai Srinivasan play supporting roles. It was a remake of the director's own Malayalam film Police Ariyaruthe (1973). Kamal Haasan worked under Thangappan as his dance assistant in this film. The film was released on 6 December 1974.

== Cast ==
- Sivakumar as Ramesh
- Jayachitra as Chitra
- Sasikumar as Inspector Sundar
- Thengai Srinivasan as Kannan
- Sripriya as Geetha
- Master Sridhar as Ravi
- C. I. D. Sakunthala as Kokila
- Kamal Haasan as Kumar (guest appearance)
- S. V. Ramadas as Masilamani
- Ennathe Kannaiah

== Soundtrack ==
The music was composed by M. S. Viswanathan, with lyrics written by Kannadasan.

Song	Singers	Length
"Sangeetham Eppothum Sugamanathu"	S. P. Balasubrahmanyam, L. R. Eswari	4:13
"Yaarumillai Ingey"	S. P. Balasubrahmanyam, P. Susheela	4:15
"Mounam Ingey"	P. Susheela	4:20
