= Tirugubatu =

1985 Indian Telugu film by Dasari Narayana Rao

- Theatrical release poster
- Directed by: Dasari Narayana Rao
- Written by: Dasari Narayana Rao
- Produced by: Vadde Sobhanadri; Vadde Ramesh
- Starring: Krishnam Raju; Jayasudha; Mohan Babu; Vijayashanti
- Music by: J. V. Raghavulu
- Production company: Vijaya Madhavi Arts
- Release date: 9 May 1985
- Country: India
- Language: Telugu

Tirugubatu (transl. Revolt) is a 1985 Indian Telugu language drama film directed by Dasari Narayana Rao. The film was produced by Vadde Sobhanadri and Vadde Ramesh under Vijaya Madhavi Arts banner. The film stars Krishnam Raju, Jayasudha, Mohan Babu and Vijayashanti in the lead roles. The music was composed by J. V. Raghavulu.

== Cast ==
- Krishnam Raju
- Jayasudha
- Mohan Babu
- Vijayashanti
- Sumalatha
- Prabhakar Reddy
- Jaggayya
- Allu Ramalingaiah
- Nutan Prasad
