= ...Aval! =

1972 film by A. C. Tirulokchandar

- Theatrical release poster
- Directed by: A. C. Thirulokachandar
- Screenplay by: A. C. Thirulokachandar; A. L. Narayanan (dialogues)
- Based on: Do Raha
- Produced by: Sunderlal Nahatha
- Starring: V. Nirmala; A. V. M. Rajan; Srikanth; Sasikumar
- Cinematography: M. Viswanath Rai
- Edited by: B. Kanthasamy
- Music by: Shankar–Ganesh
- Production company: Vijayalakshmi Pictures
- Release date: 15 September 1972
- Running time: 146 minutes
- Country: India
- Language: Tamil

...Aval! (transl. She!) is a 1972 Indian Tamil-language erotic drama film written and directed by A. C. Thirulokachandar, produced by Vijayalakshmi Pictures and presented by Nahatha Pictures. A remake of the 1971 Hindi film Do Raha, it stars V. Nirmala, A. V. M. Rajan, Srikanth and Sasikumar. The film was released on 15 September 1972 and became a commercial success.

== Plot ==
Geetha, the daughter of a millionaire, falls in love with Chandranath, a writer. Both have sex before marriage and they get married against the wishes of Geetha's father. Sadanandh, a rich publisher who lusts for Geetha, makes Chandranath rich. Chandranath takes to drinking, induces Geetha to drink and a drunk Sadanandh has sex with her; she is traumatised the next morning on learning of what happened. Later when Sadanandh tries to rape Geetha, he is shot dead by an unseen man. Geetha is tried and falsely accepts responsibility, but Chandranath claims responsibility to save her. Soon after, Chandranath's friend Prakash arrives and reveals himself as the real killer. Despite being exonerated, Geetha later commits suicide to purge herself of all she has been through.

== Cast ==
- V. Nirmala as Geetha
- A. V. M. Rajan as Prakash
- Srikanth as Sadanandh
- Sasikumar as Chandranath
- T. K. Bhagavathi as Geetha's father
- Pandari Bai
- J. P. Chandrababu

== Themes ==
Writing for Bangalore Mirror, R. S. Prakash considered ...Aval! to be one of the earliest Tamil films based entirely on sex.

== Soundtrack ==
The soundtrack was composed by Shankar–Ganesh, while the lyrics were written by Vaali.

Track listing
No.	Title	Singer(s)	Length
1.	"Geetha Oru Nal Pazhagum"	S. P. Balasubrahmanyam, P. Susheela
2.	"Adimai Naan Aadukiren"	P. Susheela
3.	"Boys And Girls Varungalam"	T. M. Soundararajan

== Release and reception ==
...Aval! was released on 15 September 1972, and was presented by Nahatha Pictures. The film was given an A certificate without any cuts. Like the original Hindi film, this too attained commercial success, and became one of the most popular films starring Nirmala, as well as a milestone in her career. The film was positively reviewed by Theekkathir who viewed it as an example of a new wave in Tamil cinema.
