= Thottathellam Ponnagum =

- Theatrical release poster
- Directed by: R. Vittal
- Written by: Panchu Arunachalam
- Produced by: K. Balakrishnan; S. Kamakshi; R. M. Manikkam
- Starring: Jaishankar; Jayachitra
- Cinematography: Dutt
- Edited by: N. Damodaran; R. Vittal
- Music by: Vijaya Bhaskar
- Production company: Geetha Chitra
- Release date: 10 January 1975
- Country: India
- Language: Tamil

Thottathellam Ponnagum (transl. All that is touched will turn to gold) is a 1975 Indian Tamil-language film directed by R. Vittal, and written by Panchu Arunachalam. The film stars Jaishankar and Jayachitra. It was released on 10 January 1975.

== Cast ==
- Jaishankar
- Jayachitra
- Manorama
- Sripriya
- K. A. Thangavelu
- V. K. Ramasamy
- Thengai Srinivasan
- Ashokan
- Vennira Aadai Moorthy

== Production ==
Thottathellam Ponnagum is Sripriya's fourth film as an actress, and was filmed in Salem. The film was written by Panchu Arunachalam, soon after the success of his previous film Kalyanamam Kalyanam (1974).

== Soundtrack ==
The music was composed by Vijaya Bhaskar, with lyrics by Kannadasan.

Track listing
No.	Title	Singer(s)	Length
1.	"Aadum Varaikum"	K. J. Yesudas
2.	"Avani Malare"	S. P. Balasubrahmanyam, P. Susheela
3.	"Ninaithathai Mudipathu"	S. P. Balasubrahmanyam
4.	"Panimalai Megankal"	S. P. Balasubrahmanyam, P. Susheela
5.	"Kanna! Enna Kadhai"	P. Susheela
6.	"AttukkuVaal"	T.M.Soundararajan, L.R.Eswari, L R.Anjali, Ponnusamy

== Release and reception ==
Thottathellam Ponnagum was released on 10 January 1975. Kanthan of Kalki appreciated Vittal's direction and Dutt's cinematography but said there was nothing to say about the story, and lauded the comedy dialogues.
