= Andaman Kadhali =

1978 film

- Theatrical release poster
- Directed by: Muktha Srinivasan
- Written by: A. S. Prakasam
- Produced by: Muktha Ramaswamy
- Starring: Sivaji Ganesan; Sujatha
- Cinematography: R. Sampath
- Edited by: V. P. Krishnan
- Music by: M. S. Viswanathan
- Production company: Muktha Films
- Release date: 26 January 1978
- Country: India
- Language: Tamil

Andaman Kadhali (transl. Lover from Andaman) is a 1978 Indian Tamil-language film, directed by Muktha Srinivasan, produced by Muktha Ramaswamy and written by A. S. Prakasam. The film stars Sivaji Ganesan, Sujatha, Chandra Mohan and Thengai Srinivasan. It was released on 26 January 1978. The film was remade in Telugu as Andaman Ammayi.

== Plot ==
Prabhu (Sivaji Ganesan) is a millionaire who worships money, and thinks it can solve all problems. He is the guardian of his boss' daughter who wants him to come to Andaman to help her buy a statue by a sculptor she is crazy about.

Prabhu used to be an inhabitant of Andaman and was the lover of Maragatham (Sujatha). While she was pregnant after they had married in secrecy due to fear of their tribe, he went to get a doctor who insulted them. In rage, he killed the doctor and in fear, ran away from Andaman. The millionaire under whom Prabhu worked, later hired him as a servant, saw his good heart and after a many years, left all the money to him with the clause that he had to keep his daughter happy.

To keep his promise, Prabhu goes to Andaman. To his shock, he finds out that the uncle of Maragatham has vowed to tattoo "womanizer" on Prabhu's forehead for ruining Maragatham's life and the sculptor, the one his ward wants to marry, is his own son who wants to make a statue of him in an insulting manner to stand as a symbol of evil. The sculptor, seeing Prabhu's arrogance while being unaware of their relationship, asks him to get his father in return for the statue and for him to marry his ward. The only way though is that Maragatham has to accept the person as her husband. The doctor too isn't dead and had merely fainted to add to the mix.

It becomes a cat and mouse game as Maragatham will not accept Prabhu as her husband under any circumstance to save him from the humiliation while Prabhu will stop at nothing to keep his word.

== Cast ==
- Sivaji Ganesan as Prabhu
- Sujatha as Maragatham
- Chandra Mohan as Madhan
- Kavitha as Kavitha
- Thengai Srinivasan as Dr. Banerji
- Manorama as Nandini / Nattiya Abinayasundari
- Sukumari as Maragatham's friend
- Y. G. Mahendran as Madhan's friend
- Kathadi Ramamurthy as Prabhu's secretary
- C. I. D. Sakunthala as secretary's wife
- Senthamarai as Maragatham's uncle
- Seema as Madhan's girlfriend

== Production ==
Andaman Kadhali was the first Tamil film to be shot in Andaman Islands.

== Soundtrack ==
The music was composed by M. S. Viswanathan, with lyrics by Kannadasan.

Song	Singers	Length
"Panamennada"	T. M. Soundararajan	03:52
"Ninaivaale"	Vani Jairam, K. J. Yesudas	04:40
"Adi Leela"	T. M. Soundararajan	03:22
"Antha Maanai"	Vani Jairam, K. J. Yesudas	04:20

== Release and reception ==
Andaman Kadhali was initially scheduled to release on 10 November 1977 (Diwali day), but delayed to 26 January 1978 (Republic Day) to avoid competition with another Ganesan film, Annan Oru Koyil, and emerged a success. Ananda Vikatan rated the film 55 out of 100. 'A critic of Free India praised the acting, cinematography, dialogues and direction but felt that the film did not clearly bring out the traditions and culture of tribals.
