= Andaman Ammayi =

1979 film

- Theatrical release poster
- Directed by: V. Madhusudhana Rao
- Written by: Acharya Aatreya (dialogues)
- Screenplay by: V. Madhusudhana Rao
- Story by: A. S. Prakasam
- Based on: Andaman Kadhali (1978)
- Produced by: T. Govindarajan
- Starring: Akkineni Nageswara Rao; Vanisri
- Cinematography: N. Balakrishna
- Edited by: S. M. Shankar
- Music by: K. V. Mahadevan
- Production company: Venus Combines
- Distributed by: Navayuga Films
- Release date: 15 June 1979
- Running time: 138 minutes
- Country: India
- Language: Telugu

Andaman Ammayi (transl. Girl from Andaman) is a 1979 Telugu-language drama film, produced by T. Govindarajan under the Venus Combines banner and directed by V. Madhusudhana Rao. It stars Akkineni Nageswara Rao, Vanisri and music composed by K. V. Mahadevan. The film is a remake of the Tamil film Andaman Kadhali (1978). It was released on 15 June 1979.

== Plot ==
The film begins at Andaman. Here, a turtle dove, Shekar & Chandra, whose love blossoms on the island, and they knit secretly. Once Chandra is ailing, Shekar rushes for her medication and is mocked by Dr. Vedantha Rao when Shekar knocks him in the rage. Declaring him dead, terrified, Shekar skips from the island. Midway, he secures a millionaire on the deck who shelters him and entrusts his property & daughter, Kavitha, to Shekar before leaving his breath. After 20 years, Shekar turns into a tycoon and dotes on Kavitha. Once, Kavitha desires to visit an art exhibition at Andaman, so Shekar hesitantly sets foot back. Whereat, he is startled to view Vedantha Rao alive, who puts past in his mind.

Currently, remorseful Vedantha Rao pleads pardon and aids in Chandra's quest. Parallelly, Kavitha gets acquainted with a sculptor, Madan, and falls for him, which he denies. Then Shekar hits him to splice Kavitha, for which he is ready to pay any cost. Here, Madan demands to detect his cowardly father, who has hoodwinked his mother. Since he aimed to crave his statue and titling as a cheater, Shekar accepted it when Madan stipulated that his mother must approve the person. Shekar walks to Madan's mother when he is startled to spot Chandra therein, and the twosome is under beatitude. Now, Shekar affirms the status quo and asks her to divulge the actuality to Madan, which he denies as she knows the consequences. Here, Shekar challenges to uncover the fact and makes numerous attempts to expose his identity via Chandra, but in vain. At last, Shekar decides to commit suicide to make Chandra come forth. At that point, Madan makes out the marriage photograph of their parents when he comprehends his father's virtue. He rushes, rescues Shekar, and states he will sculpt his statue now to adore it. Finally, the movie ends happily with the marriage of Madan & Kavitha.

== Cast ==
- Akkineni Nageswara Rao as Shekar
- Vanisri as Chandra
- Chandra Mohan as Madan
- Prabhakar Reddy
- Allu Ramalingaiah as Dr. Vedantha Rao
- Rallapalli as Hanuman Prasad
- Potti Prasad
- Rama Prabha as Bhanumathi
- Annapurna as Rajamma
- Madhavi as Puppy
- Lakshmi Sri as Kavitha
- Baby Varalakshmi as Rani

== Soundtrack ==
Music composed by K. V. Mahadevan. Lyrics were written by Acharya Aatreya.

S. No.	Song title	Singers	length
1	"Hey Lalli Pappi Lilli Malli"	S. P. Balasubrahmanyam	3:51
2	"Chitra Chitrala Bomma"	S. P. Balasubrahmanyam, P. Susheela	4:07
3	"Ee Kovela Neekai"	S. P. Balasubrahmanyam, P. Susheela	4:00
4	"Vestaanu Podupukatha"	S. P. Balasubrahmanyam, P. Susheela	4:37
5	"Endu Daaginaavura"	P. Susheela	3:13
