= Viswanatha Nayakudu =

1987 film by Dasari Narayana Rao

- Directed by: Dasari Narayana Rao
- Written by: Dasari Narayana Rao (Dialogues)
- Screenplay by: Dasari Narayana Rao
- Produced by: Vadde Ramesh
- Starring: Krishna; Krishnam Raju; Sivaji Ganesan; Jayaprada
- Cinematography: V. S. R. Swamy
- Edited by: G. G. Krishna Rao
- Music by: J. V. Raghavulu
- Production company: Vijaya Madhavi Pictures
- Release date: 14 August 1987
- Country: India
- Language: Telugu

Viswanatha Nayakudu is a 1987 Indian Telugu-language historical drama film written and directed by Dasari Narayana Rao. The film stars Krishna as Viswanatha Nayak, with Krishnam Raju, Sivaji Ganesan, Jayaprada, Sumalatha, Prabha, Prabhakar Reddy, and K. R. Vijaya in prominent roles. Set in the 16th century, it depicts the historical conflict within the Vijayanagara Empire, focusing on the loyalty and valour of Viswanatha Nayak, who confronts his father, Nagama Nayak, to uphold the authority of Emperor Sri Krishnadevaraya. The film's music was composed by J. V. Raghavulu, with cinematography by V. S. R. Swamy.

Viswanatha Nayakudu was critically acclaimed and won four Nandi Awards, including Best Cinematographer, Best Art Director, Best Costume Designer, and Best Female Playback Singer.

== Plot ==
The story is set during the 16th century and revolves around a historical conflict in the Vijayanagara Empire. It depicts the triumph of Viswanatha Nayaka over his father, Nagama Nayaka, to demonstrate his unwavering loyalty to Emperor Sri Krishnadevaraya.

Viswanatha Nayaka is the son of Nagama Nayaka, a prominent general serving under Sri Krishnadevaraya. When King Veerasekhara Chola invades the Madurai Kingdom and dethrones its ruler, King Chandrasekhara Pandyan, who is under Sri Krishnadevaraya's protection, the emperor dispatches Nagama Nayaka to restore order. Nagama Nayaka successfully defeats Veerasekhara Chola and captures Madurai. However, instead of reinstating Chandrasekhara Pandyan, Nagama Nayaka usurps the throne for himself, defying Sri Krishnadevaraya's command.

To uphold the emperor’s authority, Viswanatha Nayaka takes it upon himself to confront his father in battle. He defeats Nagama Nayaka, proving his loyalty to Krishnadevaraya. Impressed by the valour and integrity of both father and son, Krishnadevaraya crowns Viswanatha Nayaka as the King of Madurai and surrounding regions.

== Cast ==
- Krishna as Viswanatha Nayak
- Krishnam Raju as Sri Krishnadevaraya
- Sivaji Ganesan as Nagama Nayak, Viswanatha Nayak's father
- Kantha Rao
- M. Prabhakar Reddy as Timmarusu, Krishnadevaraya's minister
- K. R. Vijaya as Lalithamba, Viswanatha Nayak's mother
- Jayaprada as Kalavathi, court dancer
- Ramakrishna as Lakshminarayana Pandit, Natyacharya
- Nirmalamma as Soudamini, Kalavathi's grandmother
- Dhulipala
- Padmanabham
- Prabha
- Rajasulochana as Damayanthi, Kalavathi's mother
- Ranganath as Veerasekhara Chola
- Sarath Babu as Thimmappa
- Giri Babu as Shanmukha Raju, Son of Ummathur Sivaganga Raju
- J. V. Somayajulu
- Sumalatha

== Music ==
All lyrics are written by Arudra, Dr. C. Narayana Reddy; all music is composed by J. V. Raghavulu.

Songs
No.	Title	Playback	Length
1.	"Lalitha Kalaa"	V. Ramakrishna, Madhavapeddi Ramesh, Prakash Rao
2.	"Burra Katha"	Prakash Rao
3.	"Idhi Naatya Neeraajanam"	P. Susheela
4.	"Maravanantondhi Manasu"	P. Susheela, Madhavapeddi Ramesh
5.	"Evani"	Madhavapeddi Ramesh, V. Ramakrishna
6.	"Oka Narthaki"	P. Susheela, Raj Seetharam
7.	"Itu Naari"	P. Susheela, Vani Jairam
8.	"Vana Mayuri"	Madhavapeddi Ramesh, P. Susheela
9.	"Katthiki Katthi"	Madhavapeddi Satyam, Madhavapeddi Ramesh
10.	"Vidya Nagara"	Madhavapeddi Ramesh

== Awards ==
Nandi Awards

Year	Nominee / work	Award	Result
1987	P. Susheela (for "Kavi Jana Samaaja Bhoja")	Nandi Award for Best Female Playback Singer	Won
1987	V. S. R. Swamy	Nandi Award for Best Cinematographer	Won
1987	Bhaskar Raju	Nandi Award for Best Art Director	Won
1987	P. Venkata Rao	Nandi Award for Best Costume Designer	Won
