= Idhaya Veenai =

- Theatrical release poster
- Directed by: Krishnan–Panju
- Written by: K. Sornam
- Produced by: S. Maniyan; Vidwan V. Lakshmanan
- Starring: M. G. Ramachandran; Lakshmi; Manjula
- Cinematography: A. Shanmugham
- Edited by: M. Umanath
- Music by: Shankar–Ganesh
- Production company: Udhayam Productions
- Release date: 20 October 1972
- Running time: 146 minutes
- Country: India
- Language: Tamil

Idhaya Veenai (transl. The Heart's Veena) is a 1972 Indian Tamil-language film, directed by Krishnan–Panju. The film stars M. G. Ramachandran, Lakshmi and Manjula, with Sivakumar, M. N. Nambiar and M. G. Chakrapani in supporting roles. It was released on 20 October 1972.

== Plot ==
Somewhere in Madras, several years previously, a young Sundaram was driven away from home by Sivaraman, his father, a severe lawyer. Sivaraman denies his son. Sundaram makes a promise to his father, that one day, he will beg him to recognise him. He currently lives in the Kashmir as a tourist guide. When he finds Nalini, his younger sister, in the middle of a group of students, Sundaram decides to go back home, to gain knowledge of her and help the situation. But at the beginning, he incurs only troubles, in particular, with Kirymani, the lover of Nalini and Annamalai, a man with a double life.

== Cast ==
- M. G. Ramachandran as Sundaram
- Lakshmi as Nalini
- Manjula as Vimala
- Sivakumar as Giri
- M. N. Nambiar as Annamalai
- M. G. Chakrapani as Sivaraman
- R. S. Manohar as Karmegam
- Thengai Srinivasan as K. Muthu alias Kalimuthu
- Poornam Viswanathan as Kumarswamy, Vimala's father
- A. Sakunthala as Vasantha, Annamalai's young sister
- G. Sakunthala as Mangalam, Sivaraman's wife
- Sachu as Karmegam's daughter
- Master Sekhar as Young Sundaram
- Master Prabhakar as Young K. Muthu
- Ennatha Kannaiya as Snake Charmer
- Selvaraj as Patient's brother
- Isari Velan as Masala Vadai Seller

== Production ==
The film was produced by Udhaya Productions. Parts of Idhaya Veenai were shot in Kashmir.

== Soundtrack ==
The music was composed by Shankar–Ganesh. The song "Kashmir Beautiful" attained popularity. Ramachandran suggested Shankar–Ganesh to use veena as background score for the climax fight. 30 veenas were used for this scene and it was completed within half an hour. Veena player Raghavan was initially approached to play the veena but declined due to scheduling conflicts; his son R. Parthasarathy signed on instead.

Song	Singers	Lyrics	Length
"Aanandham Indru"	T. M. Soundararajan, S. Janaki	Vaali	03:28
"Kashmir Beautiful"	T. M. Soundararajan	Vaali	07:28
"Neeraadum"	P. Susheela	Vaali	03:29
"Oru Vaalum"	T. M. Soundararajan	Vaali	03:38
"Pon Andhi"	T. M. Soundararajan, P. Susheela	Pulamaipithan	05:49
"Thirunirai Selvi"	T. M. Soundararajan	Vaali	04:14

== Release and reception ==
Idhaya Veenai was released on 20 October 1972, Ramachandran's first release since his expulsion from the political party Dravida Munnetra Kazhagam. Kanthan of Kalki appreciated the performances of Ramachandran, Lakshmi and Sivakumar while also appreciating Krishnan–Panju's direction, Sornam's dialogues and Shanmugam's cinematography.

== Bibliography ==
- Kannan, R. (28 June 2017). MGR: A Life. New Delhi: Penguin Books. ISBN 978-93-86495-88-4.
