= Saadhanai =

- Theatrical release poster
- Directed by: A. S. Prakasam
- Written by: A. S. Prakasam
- Produced by: M. K. M. Zawahir; Imayam Pragasam
- Starring: Sivaji Ganesan; Prabhu; K. R. Vijaya; Nalini
- Cinematography: G. Or. Nathan
- Edited by: V. Rajagopal
- Music by: Ilaiyaraaja
- Production company: Pragaas Productions
- Release date: 10 January 1986
- Country: India
- Language: Tamil

Saadhanai (transl. Achievement) is a 1986 Indian Tamil-language drama film directed by A. S. Prakasam. The film stars Sivaji Ganesan, his son Prabhu, K. R. Vijaya and Nalini. It was released on 10 January 1986.

== Plot ==
Sivaji is a film director whose dream project is to make the love saga of Salim and Anarkali. After a long search for an apt girl to fit into the role of Anarkali, he finds it in a beggar. He starts the film with Nalini as Anarkali. K. R. Vijaya, wife of Sivaji starts suspecting Sivaji and Nalini's relationship and this results in turmoil inside their family. Nalini learns of this and feels that because of her, her mentor's life should not be in a mess, she leaves them without notice. Sivaji stops the project. Years later, Sivaji has a son and Prabhu, who is into spirituality and wishes to lead life as a bachelor. Sivaji on one occasion, watches a dance by Bhuvani and jumps in glory that he has again found his Anarkali in that danseuse. He discovers that the girl who danced was Nalini's daughter. Nalini's daughter is now chosen as Anarkali and Prabhu is selected as Salim. Prabhu and Bhuvani fall in love in real life too. As the drama unfolds, finally Prabhu and Bhuvani die by taking poison in a touching climax.

== Cast ==
- Sivaji Ganesan as Director Ramkumar
- Prabhu as Babu
- K. R. Vijaya as Lakshmi
- Nalini as Oorvashi Ganga / Kamatchi
- Bhuvani
- Senthil
- Ilaiyaraaja as himself
- Calcutta Viswanathan

== Production ==
The film was launched at Vijaya Studios with C. V. Sridhar switching on the camera. Scenes related to Salim and Anarkali were shot at Vijaya Vauhini Studios.

== Soundtrack ==
The soundtrack was composed by Ilaiyaraaja.

Soundtrack
Song	Singers	Lyricist
"Anbae Anbae"	S. Janaki	Vairamuthu
"Athi Mara Poovidhu"	S. Janaki	Vaali
"Ingae Naan Kandaen"	Malaysia Vasudevan, Vani Jayaram	Vaali
"Oh Vaanambaadi"	S. Janaki, S. P. Balasubrahmanyam	Pulamaipithan
"Vaadi En Rukkumani"	Malaysia Vasudevan	Vaali
"Vaazhvae Vaa"	S. Janaki, S. P. Balasubrahmanyam	Vaali

== Critical reception ==
Jayamanmadhan of Kalki wrote the film had exciting events till the interval but felt the climax was pure mess. Balumani of Anna praised acting and music but felt the film's potential to create brilliance has been put to the test as the focus given to it in the early part is slightly less in the latter part.
