= Tholireyi Gadichindi =

- Poster
- Directed by: K.S. Rami Reddy
- Starring: Murali Mohan; Rajnikanth; Jayachitra
- Cinematography: Ramachandra Babu
- Music by: Satyam
- Release date: 17 November 1977
- Country: India
- Language: Telugu

Tholireyi Gadichindi (transl. The First Day has Passed) is a 1977 Telugu-language film which stars Murali Mohan, Rajinikanth and Jayachitra. It was directed by K. S. Rami Reddy.

== Cast ==
- Murali Mohan
- Rajinikanth
- Jayachitra
- Kaikala Satyanarayana
- Mohan Babu
- Allu Rama Lingaiah
- Ramaprabha
- Jayamalini
- Sarathi
