= Deivamsam =

- Theatrical release poster
- Directed by: K. Vijayan
- Dialogues by: Vietnam Veedu Sundaram
- Story by: K. Subramanyam
- Produced by: K. Subramanyam
- Starring: A. V. M. Rajan; Chandrakala
- Cinematography: J. G. Vijayam
- Edited by: R. Devarajan
- Music by: M. S. Viswanathan
- Production company: Jeyam Combines
- Distributed by: Vijayasri Pictures
- Release date: 14 January 1973
- Country: India
- Language: Tamil

Deivamsam (transl. Part of the divine) is a 1973 Indian Tamil-language film directed by K. Vijayan and produced by K. Subramanyam. The film stars A. V. M. Rajan and Chandrakala, with Major Sundarrajan, Sasikumar and Thengai Srinivasan in supporting roles. It was released on 14 January 1973.

== Cast ==
- A. V. M. Rajan as Raju
- Chandrakala as Radha
- Major Sundarrajan as Muthaiya
- Sasikumar as Kumar
- Thengai Srinivasan
- P. R. Varalakshmi
- Kuladeivam Rajagopal
- A. Veerappan
- A. K. Veerasamy
- T. V. Kumuthini
- Sachu
- Usilai Mani
- Peeli Sivam
- C. I. D. Sakunthala (guest appearance)
- V. S. Raghavan (guest appearance)
- Shanmugasundari (uncredited)

== Soundtrack ==
The music was composed by M. S. Viswanathan, with lyrics by Kannadasan.

Track listing
No.	Title	Singer(s)	Length
1.	"Andhapurathin"	S. Janaki, L. R. Eswari
2.	"Seemaikku Ponga"	S. Janaki, L. R. Eswari
3.	"Seer Ulagam"	S. Janaki, L. R. Eswari

== Release and reception ==
Deivamsam was released on 14 January 1973 by Vijayasri Pictures. Navamani praised the story, dialogues, acting, cinematography and direction. Kanthan of Kalki praised the acting of the star cast, the dialogues, direction and climax but panned Sasikumar's acting and dialogue delivery and the inclusion of songs.
