= Pattampoochi (1975 film) =

- Poster
- Directed by: A. S. Prakasam
- Written by: A. S. Prakasam
- Produced by: P. Sreenivasan
- Starring: Kamal Haasan; Jayachitra; Nagesh; V. K. Ramasamy
- Cinematography: J. G. Vijayam
- Edited by: K. Narayanan
- Music by: P.Sreenivasan
- Production company: Sri Prakash Productions
- Release date: 21 February 1975
- Running time: 148 minutes
- Country: India
- Language: Tamil

Pattampoochi (/pəttɑːmpuːtʃi/ transl. Butterfly) is a 1975 Indian Tamil-language film directed by A. S. Prakasam, starring Kamal Haasan and Jayachitra. The film marked the Tamil debut of Haasan as a leading actor, and the directorial debut of Prakasam. It was released on 21 February 1975.

== Cast ==
- Kamal Haasan as 'Sandiyar' Siva
- Jayachitra as Meena
- Nagesh as Vadivelu
- V. K. Ramasamy as Vedhasalam
- Manorama as Kumari (guest appearance)
- Senthamarai as Bashyam
- Pakoda Kadhar
- P. R. Varalakshmi
- Shanmugasundaram
- Rathnakumar
- S. S. Sounder

== Soundtrack ==
The music was composed by P.Sreenivasan.https://macsendisk.com/product/pattaam-poochi-tamil-film-ep-vinyl-record/?srsltid=AYCX9vKjdQB9WVq4D74d8JYa2k3402Yk_inWLFSro2TsIDCWrnZIW8tv

Song	Singers	Lyrics
"Ethanai Malargal"	T. M. Soundararajan, S. Janaki	Kannadasan
"Kaniyum Kiliyum"	T. M. Soundararajan, P. Susheela	Pulamaipithan
"Madhana Kamaraja"	P. Susheela	Pulamaipithan
"Pasi Edukkum Neram"	S. P. Balasubrahmanyam, S. Janaki	Pulamaipithan
"Sakkarai Pandhalil"	T. M. Soundararajan, P. Susheela	Kannadasan

== Release and reception ==
Pattampoochi was released on 21 February 1975, and became a success. Kanthan of Kalki praised both the title and screenplay to be different, performances of Haasan and Jayachithra while also praising the film for breaking stereotypes of Tamil cinema by portraying the film's lead actor as traitor but felt the film's initial pace died down after the interval. Kumudam wrote a big drawback is that even if the youth plays in the style of Bobby for a while, it eventually gets boring.
