= Simhapuri Simham =

- Theatrical release poster
- Directed by: Kodi Ramakrishna
- Starring: Chiranjeevi; Madhavi; Radhika; Gollapudi Maruthi Rao
- Cinematography: Prasad Babu
- Edited by: K. Balu
- Music by: J. V. Raghavulu
- Release date: 20 October 1983
- Country: India
- Language: Telugu

Simhapuri Simham (transl. The lion of Simhapuri) is a 1983 Telugu film directed by Kodi Ramakrishna. The film stars Chiranjeevi, Madhavi, Radhika and Gollapudi Maruthi Rao in important roles.

== Cast ==
- Chiranjeevi as Rajashekaram & Vijay (dual role)
- Radhika as Rajashekaram's wife
- Madhavi as Vijay's girlfriend
- Gollapudi Maruthirao as brother of Rajashekaram
- Bhanuchander
- Ramana Murthy
- P. L. Narayana
- Rallapalli
- Sattibabu
- Bhaskar
- Jayamalini

== Soundtrack ==
The soundtrack was composed by J. V. Raghavulu while the lyrics were written by C. Narayana Reddy and Rajasri.

Track list
| No. | Title | Lyrics | Singer(s) | Length |
|---|---|---|---|---|
| 1. | "Chilipithanam Theegalle" | Rajasri | S. P. Balasubrahmanyam, P. Susheela | 4:12 |
| 2. | "Jigi Jigi Jimmadi" | C. Narayana Reddy | S. P. Balasubrahmanyam, P. Susheela | 4:31 |
| 3. | "Kadhalandi Kadilinchandi" | C. Narayana Reddy | S. P. Balasubrahmanyam | 3:47 |
| 4. | "College Ammayilu" | C. Narayana Reddy | S. P. Balasubrahmanyam, P. Susheela | 4:22 |
| 5. | "Ekkadundhira Nyayam" | C. Narayana Reddy | S. P. Balasubrahmanyam | 3:18 |
| 6. | "Burrakadha" | C. Narayana Reddy | S. P. Balasubrahmanyam | 4:51 |
| Total length: | | | | 25:04 |
