= Amresh Ganesh =

Indian actor

- Born: 15 October 1988 (age 37); Chennai, Tamil Nadu, India
- Occupations: Actor, film composer, music director
- Instrument: keyboard/piano
- Spouse: Keerthi Hanusha

Amresh Ganesh is an Indian musician and former actor who has worked in Tamil language films. The son of actress Jayachitra, Amresh appeared as an actor in his mother's productions Pudhiya Raagam (1991) and then in Naane Ennul Illai (2010), before working as a music composer from the 2010s onwards.

== Career ==
Amresh Ganesh was born to industrialist Ganesh and film actress Jayachitra, with the actress launching him as a child artiste in Pudhiya Raagam (1991) before relaunching him as an actor several years later. Amresh first gained attention by composing for a four-language music album titled Jeevitham, which was released in 2008 and featured singers including S. P. Balasubrahmanyam, Karthik and Sujatha. Despite Jayachitra directing his debut through Naane Ennul Illai (2010), the film's failure made it difficult for Amresh to succeed as an actor. In 2011, it was announced that he would work on projects titled Kaliyuga Kadhalan and Machan Ava En Aalu Da, with the former being set in three different eras, but neither film was completed. Later in the year, Jayachitra announced that she was working on three more films with Amresh in the lead role, Mundru Mugangal, Nedunchalai and Scene Podathey, but again neither film materialised. He also shot for a comedy film titled Kadan Vaangi Kalyanam alongside Mansoor Ali Khan during late 2011, but the film also did not release. In 2013, he briefly worked on the making of another incomplete film Thaaru Maaru, which had a grand launch event.

In 2015, he was signed on by producer R. B. Choudary and director Sai Ramani to work on the music for the film, Motta Shiva Ketta Shiva (2017) starring Raghava Lawrence. Prior to the release of the film, actor Tinku released a video alleging that Amresh had stolen a song titled "Hara Hara Mahadevaki" from a film that he and Robert were making titled Thaathaa Car-ai Thodadhae. Tinku alleged that Amresh had worked together with them to create the song during early 2015, but production troubles had shelved the film and subsequently Amresh had taken the song to a different project. In a press meet in February 2017, Amresh Ganesh refuted the claims and provided evidence of Tinku and Robert continuously trying to scam him by gathering funds for the shelved project. Amresh stated that he had developed the song free of cost and had paid for the duo to take part in a failed shoot of the song in Bangkok, before the film was stalled. Moreover, Amresh revealed that Robert had owned up to playing the song to music composer Srikanth Deva, and had attempted to include it in another shelved film titled Minor Kunju Kaanom which Tinku, Robert and Srikanth Deva were involved in.

His next release was Pottu.

== Personal life ==
He married Keerthi Hanusha on 19 October 2016. Their daughter was born in 2019.

== Filmography ==
Year	Film	Role	Notes
1991	Pudhiya Raagam	Anu Mohan	Child artiste
2010	Naane Ennul Illai	Amresh	
2024	Dhil Raja	Himself	Special appearance in "Saamy Kuthu"

== Discography ==
=== Released soundtracks ===
- The year next to the title of the affected films indicates the release year of the either dubbed or remade version in the named language later than the original version.
- • indicates original language release. Indicates simultaneous makes, if featuring in more languages
- ♦ indicates a remade version, the remaining ones being dubbed versions

Year	Tamil	Other languages	Notes
2010	Naane Ennul Illai •		
2017	Motta Shiva Ketta Shiva •		
2018	Bhaskar Oru Rascal •		
2019	Charlie Chaplin 2 •		
2019	Pottu •		
2019	Sathru •		
2019		Okate Life • (Telugu)	
2019	En Kaadhali Scene Podura •		
2021	Paramapadham Vilayattu •		
2023		Rules Ranjann (Telugu) •	
2024	Pambattam •	Naagmati (Hindi)	
2024	Dhil Raja •		
2026	Sandakkari •		

=== Singer ===
Year	Film	Song(s)	Notes
2010	Naane Ennul Illai	"Pirappuna Irakkavendum"	also lyrics
2017	Motta Shiva Ketta Shiva	"Hara Hara Mahadevaki", "Ivan Kaakhi Sattai"	
2018	Bhaskar Oru Rascal	"Bhaskar Oru Rascolu"	
2018	Charlie Chaplin 2	"Ivala Ivala", "Mamu Mamu", "Jinga Bunga"	also lyrics for Jinga Bunga
2021	Paramapadham Vilayattu	"Dhogana Kodakka"	
