= Engal Thanga Raja =

1973 Indian Tamil film

- Theatrical release poster
- Directed by: V. B. Rajendra Prasanth
- Screenplay by: Balamurugan
- Story by: P. Chinnappa Reddy
- Produced by: V. B. Rajendra Prasanth
- Starring: Sivaji Ganesan; Manjula
- Cinematography: S. Venkatarathnam
- Edited by: A. Sanjeevi; P. S. Prakash Rao
- Music by: K. V. Mahadevan
- Production company: Jagapathy Art Pictures
- Distributed by: Sivaji Films
- Release date: 14 July 1973
- Country: India
- Language: Tamil

Engal Thanga Raja (transl. Our Precious King) is a 1973 Indian Tamil-language film, directed and produced by V. B. Rajendra Prasanth. The film stars Sivaji Ganesan, Manjula, and Sowcar Janaki. It is a remake of the 1972 Telugu film Manavudu Danavudu, and loosely adapts the 1886 novel Strange Case of Dr Jekyll and Mr Hyde by Robert Louis Stevenson.

== Cast ==
- Sivaji Ganesan as Dr. Thangaraja (alias) Raja/Pattakathi Bhairavan
- Manjula as Vasanthi
- Sowcar Janaki as Seetha
- Major Sundarrajan as Kadhar Bai/Thatha
- R. S. Manohar as Vedhachalam
- S. V. Ramadas as Dharmalingam
- Nagesh as Gopi
- Rama Prabha as Radha
- Gandhimathi as Kanaga
- C. I. D. Sakunthala as Rani (Dancer)
- Veeraraghavan as College Principal
- Boopathiraja as Young Raja
- Master Giri as Young Ramu
- Gemini Mali as Ramlal Sett
- Comedy Shanmugam as Anthonysamy
- T. K. S. Natarajan as Raja College Mate
- S. R. Janaki as Appakadai Aaya

== Production ==
The film was launched at Vijaya Studios and a song was recorded on the same day. The songs were filmed at Ooty. Boopathiraja, son of film's screenwriter Balamurugan portrayed the younger version of Ganesan's character.

== Soundtrack ==
The music was composed by K. V. Mahadevan, with lyrics by Kannadasan. The song "Iravukkum Pagalukkum" became hugely popular.

Song	Singers	Length
"Samy Ilum Samy Ithu"	P. Susheela	04:04
"Kalayana Aasaivantha"	T. M. Soundararajan, P. Susheela	04:05
"Muthangal Nooru"	T. M. Soundararajan, L. R. Eswari	03:13
"Karpa Maanama"	T. M. Soundararajan	03:57
"Iravukkum Pagalukkum"	T. M. Soundararajan, P. Susheela	03:50
"Iraiva Iraiva Kodiyil Oruvan"	P. Susheela	04:01

== Reception ==
Kanthan of Kalki said the story was being driven by Janaki. The film ran for over 100 days in theatres.
