= Vellikizhamai Viratham =

1974 film by Ramamurthy Thyagarajan

- Theatrical release poster
- Directed by: R. Thyagarajan
- Screenplay by: Aaroor Dass
- Story by: Sandow M. M. A. Chinnappa Thevar
- Produced by: Sandow M. M. A. Chinnappa Thevar
- Starring: Sivakumar; Jayachitra; Jayasudha
- Cinematography: V. Ramamoorthy
- Edited by: M. G. Balu Rao; P. Babu
- Music by: Shankar–Ganesh
- Production company: Dhandayudhapani Films
- Release date: 12 April 1974
- Running time: 146 minutes
- Country: India
- Language: Tamil

Vellikizhamai Viratham (pronounced [ʋeɭɭikiɻamaɪ ʋiɾaðam] transl. Fast on Friday) is a 1974 Indian Tamil-language devotional film, directed by R. Thyagarajan in his debut and produced by Sandow M. M. A. Chinnappa Thevar under Dhandayudhapani Films. The film stars Sivakumar, Jayachitra and Jayasudha, along with Nagesh, Sundarrajan, Srikanth and Sasikumar in supporting roles. It was released on 12 April 1974. The film was remade in both Telugu (as Nomu) and Hindi (as Shubh Din) in 1974.

== Cast ==
- Sivakumar as Nagarajan / Rajan
- Nagesh as Ramu
- Sundarrajan as Kanthasamy
- Srikanth as Ashok
- Sasikumar as Suresh
- Sandow M. M. A. Chinnappa Thevar as Nattamai
- Jayachitra as Parvathi
- Jayasudha as Jaya

== Production ==
Vellikizhamai Viratham is the directorial debut of R. Thyagarajan. Kamal Haasan worked under K. Thangappan as his dance assistant. The film's story was written by Sandow Chinnappa Thevar inspired from the films The Shadow of the Cat and Cult of the Cobra who initially created a plot revolving around a child and snake since Thyagarajan wanted romance, a new plot was formed. Thyagarajan revealed sound overlapping system technology was used in the film. Thyagarajan initially wanted to film in black-and-white; however Chinnappa Thevar insisted him to film in colour. 15 cobras were bought specially for this film.

== Soundtrack ==
Music was composed by Shankar–Ganesh and lyrics were written by A. Maruthakasi.

Song	Singer	Length
"Yethaiyo Ninaithathu"	P. Susheela	3:44
"Aasai Anbu"	T. M. Soundararajan P. Susheela	3:37
"Deviyin Thirumugam"	T. M. Soundararajan P. Susheela	3:46
"Gellu Gellu" (Charming Beautiful)	T. M. Soundararajan P. Susheela	4:12

== Release and reception ==
Vellikizhamai Viratham was released on 12 April 1974. Navamani praised the dialogues, acting, music and snake related adventures. The film was a major success, and propelled Jayachitra to stardom.
