= Sasikumar (actor, born 1944) =

Indian actor and army officer

- Born: Vijaykumar; 8 December 1944; Kumbakonam, Tamil Nadu
- Died: 24 August 1974 (aged 29); Chennai, Tamil Nadu
- Other names: Radha Vijaykumar; Radha Vetriselvan
- Education: B. Sc Chemistry
- Occupations: Actor, army officer
- Years active: 1969–1974
- Spouse: Sasikala (died 1974)
- Children: 2, including Vijayasarathy)
- Father: Radhakrishnan

Vijaykumar (8 December 1944 – 24 August 1974) better known by his stage name Sasikumar, was an Indian actor and army officer who worked mainly in Tamil cinema.

== Early life ==
Sasikumar was born Vijaykumar on 8 December 1944 to Radhakrishnan and Savithri in Kumbakonam, Tamil Nadu. Radhakrishnan, a follower of E. V. Ramasamy, worked at the National College, Tiruchirappalli as a Hindi professor. Vijaykumar studied chemistry at the same college, eventually graduating with a B.Sc degree.

== Career ==
While in his third year at college, Vijaykumar joined the army and became the second lieutenant; he registered under the name "Vetriselvan", previously conferred upon him by E. V. Ramasamy. After completing his college education, he was promoted to lieutenant and went to Patiala. During the Sino-Indian War of 1962, he took over the leadership of the Button Bearing Division and won the President's Medal of Valour for driving out soldiers without using the bearings in the war. He later went to Madras (now Chennai) after being relieved of his military service, married Sasikala and founded a theatre troupe, acting in many of his plays. When filmmaker A. P. Nagarajan saw one of those plays and was impressed with Vijaykumar's performance, he cast him in Thirumalai Thenkumari (1970), making it Vijaykumar's film debut; Vijaykumar adopted the stage name Sasikumar, partly inspired by his wife. He went on to act in numerous successful films, including ...Aval!, Kasethan Kadavulada (both 1972), Arangetram, Bharatha Vilas, Rajapart Rangadurai, Suryagandhi (all in 1973), and Vellikizhamai Viratham (1974).

== Death ==
Sasikumar was leaving for a Congress public meeting when Sasikala was caught in a fire when she lit cooking gas in the kitchen. When Sasikumar tried to save his wife from the fire, it engulfed them both. They were taken to Royapettah Hospital, where both died on 24 August 1974. They had two children, a six-year old daughter and a four-year old son, who were subsequently raised by their grandmother. His son Vijayasarathy was a Sun TV anchor who hosted many successful programs in the 1990s and 2000s.

== Filmography ==
Year	Title	Role	Notes	Ref.
1969	Thirudan	Dancer		
1970	Thirumalai Thenkumari	Mohan		
1971	Veettukku Oru Pillai	Kalaimani		
1972	...Aval!	Chandranath		
1972	Kasethan Kadavulada	Mani		
1973	Deivamsam	Kumar		
1973	Arangetram	Pasupathy		
1973	Bharatha Vilas	Ameer		
1973	Rajapart Rangadurai	Ramu		
1973	Suryagandhi	Sundaram		
1974	Panathukkaga	Sundar		
1974	Paruva Kaalam	Jambhu		
1974	Vellikizhamai Viratham	Suresh		
1975	Manidhanum Dheivamagalam	Kannan		
1978	Ennai Pol Oruvan	Usha's brother		
