= Jyoti Bane Jwala =

- Theatrical release poster
- Directed by: Dasari Narayana Rao
- Written by: Raj Baldev Raj (Dialogue)
- Screenplay by: Dasari Narayana Rao
- Story by: Dasari Narayana Rao
- Based on: Katakatala Rudrayya (1978)
- Produced by: Prasan Kapoor; Jeetendra (Presents)
- Starring: Jeetendra; Vinod Mehra; Moushumi Chatterjee; Sarika; Waheeda Rehman
- Cinematography: M. Kannappa
- Edited by: G.G. Krishna Rao
- Music by: Laxmikant–Pyarelal
- Production company: Tirupati Pictures Enterprises
- Release date: 6 June 1980
- Running time: 166 minutes
- Country: India
- Language: Hindi

Jyoti Bane Jwala (transl. A flame becomes a conflagration) is a 1980 Indian Hindi-language action film written and directed by Dasari Narayana Rao, and produced by Prasan Kapoor. It stars Jeetendra, Vinod Mehra, Waheeda Rehman, Moushumi Chatterjee, Sarika in the pivotal roles and music composed by Laxmikant–Pyarelal. The film is a remake of the Telugu film Katakatala Rudrayya. It was a commercial success and became one of the highest-grossing films of the year.

== Cast ==
- Jeetendra as Suraj/Jyoti/ Kishore/Jwala Singh
- Moushumi Chatterjee as Anu
- Vinod Mehra as Police Inspector Arjun Bakshi
- Waheeda Rehman as Malti
- Sarika as Asha
- Sanjeev Kumar (Special Appearance)
- Rekha (Special Appearance)
- Ashok Kumar as Dr. Bose
- Kader Khan as Dharamdas
- Satyendra Kapoor as Parvati's husband
- Seema Deo as Parvati
- Shreeram Lagoo as S.P. Bakshi
- Iftekhar as Mr. Berde (Jailor)

== Soundtrack ==
Lyrics: Anand Bakshi

Song	Singer
Main Jogan Hoon, Tu Jogi	Kishore Kumar, Asha Bhosle
Dil Dhadak Raha Hai, Iska Kya Sabab Hai, Pyar Ho Gaya Hai	Kishore Kumar, Lata Mangeshkar, Mohammed Rafi
Kisi Din Uth Gaya Jo Mera Haath, Balam Aisa Maarungi	Lata Mangeshkar, Jeetendra
Tel Malish, Boot Polish	Asha Bhosle, Usha Mangeshkar
