= Thavapudhalavan =

1967 film by Muktha Srinivasan

Thavapudhalvan
- Poster
- Directed by: Muktha Srinivasan
- Written by: Thooyavan
- Produced by: Muktha Ramaswamy
- Starring: Sivaji Ganesan; K. R. Vijaya
- Cinematography: N. S. Verma
- Edited by: E. V. Shanmugam
- Music by: M. S. Viswanathan
- Production company: Muktha Films
- Release date: 26 August 1972
- Running time: 169 minutes
- Country: India
- Language: Tamil

Thavapudhalavan (transl. Precious Son, a son born after a penance by the parents) is a 1972 Indian Tamil-language drama film directed by Muktha Srinivasan and produced by Muktha Ramaswamy. The film stars Sivaji Ganesan and K. R. Vijaya. It was released on 26 August 1972 and ran for 100 days to become a hit.

== Plot ==
Nirmal (Sivaji Ganesan) is the son of a wealthy family, but he prefers to lead an independent life rather than relying on his family’s wealth. He is a talented musician who plays in an orchestra at a luxury hotel. His passion for music drives him, and despite his affluent background, he finds fulfillment in his work as a musician. One day, Nirmal notices that his vision has started to deteriorate at night. He soon realizes that he is suffering from night blindness (nyctalopia), a condition that severely impairs his ability to see in low light or darkness. Fearing that this condition could jeopardize his career and independence, Nirmal decides to keep his ailment a secret from everyone, including his family and colleagues. Vimala (Jayachitra), a dancer at the hotel where Nirmal works, becomes aware of his condition. Recognizing an opportunity, she decides to exploit Nirmal’s vulnerability for her gain. Vimala starts manipulating Nirmal, leading to a complicated and emotionally charged relationship between them. She uses Nirmal’s night blindness to blackmail him, threatening to reveal his secret and ruin his life if he does not comply with her demands. Amidst this turmoil, Nirmal's life is further complicated by his relationship with Radha (K. R. Vijaya), a kind and understanding woman who genuinely loves him. Radha is unaware of Nirmal’s condition and the struggles he is facing. She supports Nirmal and stands by him, even as she senses that something is amiss in his life. Radha’s love and loyalty become a source of strength for Nirmal, but his reluctance to confide in her about his night blindness creates a barrier between them. As Nirmal's condition worsens, he faces increasing challenges in his personal and professional life. His inability to see at night leads to several dangerous situations, and he struggles to maintain his facade. The tension between Nirmal, Vimala, and Radha escalates, with Vimala’s manipulations threatening to destroy Nirmal’s relationship with Radha.The plot thickens when Nirmal’s night blindness leads to a series of dramatic events, including misunderstandings, betrayals, and a tragic accident. As the story reaches its climax, Nirmal is forced to confront the consequences of his secrecy. The truth about his condition eventually comes to light, leading to a confrontation between Nirmal, Vimala, and Radha. In the end, Nirmal’s integrity and resilience help him overcome the challenges posed by his night blindness. He realizes the importance of honesty and trust in his relationships, especially with Radha, who remains steadfast in her support. The film concludes on a poignant note, with Nirmal learning valuable life lessons about love, trust, and the strength to face one’s fears.

== Cast ==
- Sivaji Ganesan as Nirmal
- K. R. Vijaya as Vasanthi
- Pandari Bai as Rajalakshmi
- V. Gopalakrishnan as Eswaran
- Gandhimathi as Eswari
- M. R. R. Vasu as Jambu
- Cho as James
- Manorama as Pankajam
- Senthamarai as Doctor
- K. K. Soundar as Blindman
- A. Sakunthala as Vimala
- K. Kannan as Henchman
- Thikkurissy Sukumaran Nair (guest appearance)
- Vijayachandrika as Nurse

== Production ==
The inspiration for the lead character's evening blindness disease came from a friend of Srinivasan.

== Soundtrack ==
The music was composed by M. S. Viswanathan, with lyrics by Kannadasan & Vaali Kinkini written by vaali.https://macsendisk.com/thavapputhalvan-tamil-film-ep-vinyl-record-by-m-s-viswanahthan/ Randor Guy wrote the English portions of "Love is Fine". The song "Isai Kettal" is set in Kalyani raga.

Song	Singers	Lyrics	Length
"Love Is Fine Darling"	Ajith Sing L. R. Easwari	Randor Guy & Vaali	04:40
"Ulagin Mudalisai"	T. M. Soundararajan, P. B. Srinivas	Kannadasan	03:19
"Isai Kettal Puvi"	T. M. Soundararajan	Kannadasan	04:41
"Kinkini Kinkini"	T. M. Soundararajan	Vaali	04:38
