= 20va Sathabdam =

- Directed by: Kodi Ramakrishna
- Written by: Sri Sai Ram Films Unit; Ganesh Patro (dialogues)
- Screenplay by: Kodi Ramakrishna
- Produced by: R. V. Vijaya Kumar; D. Rama Chary; D. Venkata Chary
- Starring: Suman; Devaraj; Lizy
- Cinematography: Kodi Lakshman
- Edited by: K. V. Krishna Reddy
- Music by: J. V. Raghavulu
- Production company: Sri Sai Ram Films
- Release date: 1990
- Country: India
- Language: Telugu

20va Sathabdam (subtitled with the translated title 20th Century) is a 1990 Telugu action crime thriller film directed by Kodi Ramakrishna. The film stars Suman, Devaraj and Lizy, with Suman Ranganathan in a cameo role. It is produced by R. V. Vijay Kumar under the Sri Sai Ram Creations banner. The music was composed by J. V. Raghavulu.

The movie shows how crime was in the 20th century. Chart-topping songs include "Ammani Minchi Daivamunnada" and "Naa Prema Nava Parijatam". The former is one of the best Telugu songs about the mother.The movie is a remake of the 1987 Malayalam movie Irupatham Noottandu starring Mohanlal, which was also remade in Kannada as Jackey (1989), starring Ambareesh. Devaraj reprised his role from the Kannada version. Suman later appeared in a villain role in Sagar Alias Jacky Reloaded, the sequel of the original Malayalam film.

== Cast ==
- Suman as Chandram / King
- Devaraj as Suryam
- Lizy as Rani
- Suman Ranganathan
- Gopi
- Babu Mohan as Suryam's uncle
- R. V. Vijay Kumar
- Ashok Kumar
- Dubbing Janaki as Chandram's mother
- Telangana Shakuntala
- Bhavani Prasad
- Koka Raghava Rao

== Soundtrack ==
- "Ammani Minchi Daivamunnada" -
- "20va Sathabdam" -
- "Ammani Minchi Daivamunnada" (Sad) -
- "Kaalina Manasuto" -
- "Naa Prema Nava Parijatam" -
