= Mathru Bhoomi =

- Poster
- Directed by: H. M. Reddy
- Screenplay by: K. Subbarao
- Story by: Dwijendralal Ray
- Starring: T. S. Santhanam; P. U. Chellappa; A. K. Rajalakshmi
- Music by: Papanasam Sivan
- Production company: ALRM Company
- Release date: 29 October 1939
- Country: India
- Language: Tamil

Mathru Bhoomi is a 1939 Indian Tamil-language film directed by H. M. Reddy. It was an adaptation of the Bengali stage play Chandragupta by Dwijendralal Ray.

== Plot ==
The film was based on Alexander's invasion of India, an allegory to the British conquest and occupation of India.

== Cast ==
- P. U. Chinnappa
- T. S. Santhanam
- T. V. Kumudhini
- A. K. Rajalakshmi
- Kali N. Rathnam
- T. R. B. Rao
- P. Saradambal

== Production ==
Mathru Bhoomi is an adaptation of the Bengali stage play Chandragupta. The film was mounted on a record budget of ₹2 lakh (worth ₹34 crore in 2021 prices) and took 1 year to complete. P. S. Ramakrishna Rao, who went on to become a popular director in Telugu cinema, joined the film as an assistant director.

In 1937, the Indian nationalist party the Indian National Congress defeated the pro-British Justice Party for the first time in the elections to the Madras Legislative Assembly and Chakravarthi Rajagopalachari was sworn in as the Chief Minister. As an immediate consequence of this change of guard, censorship was relaxed on Tamil films. Encouraged by the new government's policies, a few films were made glorifying the Indian independence movement and Indian national leaders of which Mathrubhoomi was one.
