= Vadde Ramesh =

Indian film producer (1947–2013)

- Born: 7 July 1947; Yelamarru, Krishna District, Andhra Pradesh, India
- Died: 21 November 2013 (aged 66); KIMS; Hyderabad
- Occupation: Producer
- Children: Vadde Naveen (son)

Vadde Ramesh (11 October 1947 – 21 November 2013) was an Indian film producer who produced movies in the Hindi and Telugu languages.

== Background ==
Ramesh was born on 11 October 1947 in Elamarru Village of Krishna District. He made his debut in Telugu Film Industry in 1976 with the film Padavoi Bharateeyuda which was directed by Dasari Narayana Rao.

== Death ==
Ramesh died on 21 November 2013 at KIMS hospital, Hyderabad, following cancer.

== Filmography ==
- Katakatala Rudrayya (1978)
- Rangoon Rowdy (1979)
- Bobbili Puli (1982)
- Sur Sangam (1985) (Hindi)
- Viswanatha Nayakudu (1987)
- Lankeswarudu (1989)
- Sri Edu Kondala Swami (1991)
- Karnaa (1995) (Tamil)
