= Pudhiya Raagam =

- Poster
- Directed by: Jayachitra
- Written by: Jayachitra
- Produced by: Jayachitra
- Starring: Jayachitra; Rahman; Raghuvaran
- Cinematography: K. S. Mani; V. Ranga; B. S. Lokanath
- Edited by: P. Mohanraj
- Music by: Ilaiyaraaja
- Production company: Amresh Pictures
- Release date: 21 June 1991
- Running time: 140 minutes
- Country: India
- Language: Tamil

Pudhiya Raagam (transl. New raga) is a 1991 Indian Tamil-language drama film written, directed and produced by Jayachitra, making her directorial debut with the film featuring herself in the lead role with her son Amresh Ganesh (portraying child artist), Rahman and Raghuvaran, with Rupini, S. S. Chandran, Chinni Jayanth, Varun Raj and Kovai Sarala playing supporting roles. The film was released on 21 June 1991.

== Plot ==
The film starts with the famous singer Anuradha marrying Raghuraman. Four years later, Anuradha and Raghuraman are not happy with each other, and they don't have kids. Anuradha becomes a busy singer, while Raghuraman doesn't believe in hard work and wants to earn easy money. To finance his sister's wedding, Raghuraman starts to steal money from his wife and to sell her jewels without her knowledge. Even after Anuradha finally realises his trickery and lies, she can do nothing. Thereafter, Anuradha meets her former lover Raja who is now married and has a kid named Anu Mohan.

In the past, Anuradha helped Raja to become a good singer, Raja slowly fell in love with Anuradha. Whereas Raja's relative Sheela was in love with Raja and Sheela compelled him to marry her but Raja refused to marry her. After her suicide attempt, Raja was obliged to marry Sheela.

The situation gets tense when Raghuraman expels Anuradha's brother Gopi from the house and he openly confesses his affair to Anuradha with another woman. He is later arrested for fraud but Anuradha then brings out of the prison. Anuradha still likes her husband and she is determined to endure the suffering. Anuradha finds solace by playing with Raja's baby Anu Mohan, afterwards, Raja reveals that he is a widower. What transpires next forms the rest of the story.

== Cast ==
- Jayachitra as Anuradha
- Rahman as Raja
- Raghuvaran as Raghuraman
- Rupini as Sheela
- Amresh Ganesh as Anu Mohan
- S. S. Chandran as Jil
- Chinni Jayanth as Vivek
- Varun Raj as Gopi
- Kovai Sarala as Bulbul
- C. R. Saraswathi as Raghuraman's mother
- Prathapachandran as Raghuraman's father
- Omakuchi Narasimhan as Tavil
- Gundu Kalyanam as Dholak
- Singamuthu as Clarinet
- Oru Viral Krishna Rao
- Pandari Bai as Thaiyamma
- S. N. Lakshmi as Raja's grandmother
- T. S. Raghavendra as Raja's father
- Typist Gopu
- G. Srinivasan
- Karikalan
- A. Sakunthala
- Crazy Venkatesh as Venkatesh
- Gangai Amaran (cameo)

== Soundtrack ==
The music was composed by Ilaiyaraaja, with lyrics written by Vaali and Kanmani Subbu. For the dubbed Telugu version Anubandhalu, all lyrics were written by Rajasri.

Tamil

Song	Singer(s)	Lyrics	Length
"Maalai Soodum"	K. S. Chithra	Kanmani Subbu	4:38
"Vaadumo Oviyam"	Mano, S. Janaki	Vaali	4:56
"Oh Janani"	Mano	Kanmani Subbu	4:55
"Malligai Maalai Katti"	Ilaiyaraaja	Vaali	5:01
"Deivangal"	Mano, S. Janaki	Vaali	5:01

Telugu

Song	Singer(s)	Length
"Paade Choodu"	S. Janaki	4:41
"Oh Janani Naa Vani"	Mano	4:39
"Padana Na Swaramu"	Mano, S. Janaki	4:55
"Pachchani Pandarilona"	P. Susheela	4:59
"Daivale Deevinchina"	Mano, S. Janaki	5:00

== Reception ==
C. R. K. of Kalki praised the acting of actors and Ilaiyaraaja's music but criticised the climax as unnecessary masala.
