= Cinema Paithiyam =

1975 film

- Theatrical release poster
- Directed by: Muktha Srinivasan
- Screenplay by: A. S. Prakasam
- Story by: Gulzar
- Produced by: A. L. Srinivasan
- Starring: Jaishankar; Jayachitra
- Cinematography: V. Selvaraj
- Edited by: V. P. Krishnan
- Music by: Shankar–Ganesh
- Production company: A. L. S. Productions
- Release date: 31 January 1975
- Running time: 152 minutes
- Country: India
- Language: Tamil

Cinema Paithiyam (transl. Cinephile) is a 1975 Indian Tamil-language drama film, directed by Muktha Srinivasan. The film stars Jaishankar and Jayachitra. It is a remake of the Hindi film Guddi (1971). The film was released on 31 January 1975 and became a commercial success.

== Plot ==
Jaya is a cinephile. So obsessed is she with cinema, that she worships the popular actor Jaishankar, believing all that he portrays on screen, to be his real self. He becomes the ideal man of her dreams, and she even tattoos his name in her arm. Hell breaks loose when she refuses to marry Natarajan, the boy arranged by her brother and her sister-in-law. At this juncture, her uncle steps in, taking it upon himself to show her the true world, by taking her on a trip around the real life of a star.

== Cast ==
- Sivaji Ganesan as himself (dressed up as Vanchinathan) (Note: This actor makes a guest appearance.)
- Jaishankar as himself
- Major Sundarrajan as Sivalingam
- V. K. Ramasamy as Chidambaram
- Cho as Ramani
- Kamal Haasan as Natarajan
- Senthamarai as himself
- Neelu as Kadha kaalatchebam singer
- Sowcar Janaki as Lakshmi
- Jayachitra as Jaya
- S. Varalakshmi as Teacher
- P. R. Varalakshmi as Kamala
- Sachu as Pappa
- S. N. Parvathy as Teacher
- Jayalalithaa as herself
- K. Balaji as himself
- Manorama as Ponnamma / Junior artist agent
- A. Sakunthala as herself
- A. Bhimsingh as himself
- P. Madhavan as himself
- C. V. Rajendran as himself
- T. K. S. Natarajan as Boopathy (uncredited)

== Soundtrack ==
The music was composed by Shankar–Ganesh, with lyrics by Kannadasan.

Song	Singers
"En Ullam Azhagana"	Vani Jairam
"Naan Ariyatha"	T. M. Soundararajan
"I Will Sell My Beauty"	L. R. Eswari

== Release and reception ==
Cinema Paithiyam was released on 31 January 1975. Kanthan of Kalki positively reviewed the film, comparing it favourably to the Hindi original. Kumudam praised the performances of Kamal Haasan, Jayachithra and Sowcar Janaki and added that Guddi was pleasant and sweet; however Cinema Paithiyam lacked it. Naagai Dharuman of Navamani praised the acting of the star cast, Prakasam's dialogues, Srinivasan's direction and the film's message. Jayachitra later claimed in an interview that this film ran for 100 days at Devi-Sridevi Complex in Madras, and that "this was the first Tamil black-and-white film that ran for so long in that theater complex".
