= Naane Ennul Illai =

- Production poster
- Directed by: Jayachitra
- Written by: Jayachitra
- Produced by: Jayachitra
- Starring: Amresh Ganesh; Arya Menon; Raaghav; Nassar; Saranya Ponvannan
- Music by: Amresh Ganesh
- Production company: Senthur Murugan Combines
- Release date: 15 October 2010
- Country: India
- Language: Tamil

Naane Ennul Illai (transl. Even I Am Not In Me) is a 2010 Tamil-language film written and directed by former actress Jayachitra, starring her son Amresh Ganesh, in his acting debut, and Arya Menon, with Raaghav, Nassar, and Saranya Ponvannan, among others, playing supporting roles. Amresh Ganesh also worked as the film's music composer, besides writing and singing one song. The film, produced by Sendhur Murugan Combines, released to poor reviews.

== Plot ==
Amaresh, a college student, falls in love with Ishwarya. Together, they nurture a dream of becoming actors. Problems arise when Ranjith, a rowdy who has eyes on Ishwarya, starts troubling Amaresh.

== Cast ==
- Amresh Ganesh as Amresh
- Arya Menon as Aishwarya
- Raaghav as Ranjith
- Nassar as Vasu
- Saranya Ponvannan as Janaki
- Mohan V. Ram as Natraj
- Lavanya as Vaani
- Radharavi
- Y. Gee. Mahendra
- Visu
- Gurleen Chopra
- Flora Saini
- Jayachitra
- Sathyapriya
- Kuyili
- K. S. Jayalakshmi
- Bosskey
- Kottachi
- K. S. Ravikumar as himself (Guest appearance)
- P. Vasu as himself (Guest appearance)
- K. Bhagyaraj as himself (Guest appearance)
- Gangai Amaran as himself

== Soundtrack ==
The soundtrack was composed by Amresh Ganesh in his debut as both lead actor and composer.

Naane Ennul Illai

Soundtrack album by Amresh Ganesh
- Released: 6 August 2010
- Recorded: 2010
- Genre: Feature film soundtrack
- Length: 27:55
- Producer: Amresh Ganesh

Amresh Ganesh chronology
Naane Ennul Illai (2010)	Motta Shiva Ketta Shiva (2017)

Naane Ennul Illai
No.	Title	Singer	Lyricist	Time
1	"Neeyaruda Naanyaruda"	Tippu	Kavignar Karunanidhi	5:58
2	"Naan Ennul Illai"	Hariharan, Sadhana Sargam	Snehan	6:24
3	"Medhuvaga Medhuvaga"	Karthik, Chinmayi	Snehan	5:05
4	"Naane Ennul Illai Remix"	Amresh Ganesh	Amresh Ganesh	2:42
5	"Pirapuna Irakavendum"	Amresh Ganesh	Amresh Ganesh	4:42
6	"Naane Ennul Illai Classic Theme"	Hariharan, Sadhana Sargam	Snehan	3:04

== Reception ==
New Indian Express wrote "Naane Ennul Illai is a case of good intention gone haywire". The Hindu wrote "The maker's intention may be worthy, but the execution is frivolous".
