= Aatmiyudu =

- Theatrical release poster
- Directed by: T. Rama Rao
- Written by: Satyanand (dialogues)
- Screenplay by: T. Rama Rao
- Story by: T. Rama Rao
- Produced by: Vadde Sobhanadri
- Starring: Akkineni Nageswara Rao; Jayachitra
- Cinematography: P. S. Selvaraj
- Edited by: G. G. Krishna Rao
- Music by: J. V. Raghavulu
- Production company: Vijaya Madhavi Pictures
- Release date: 1977
- Running time: 142 mins
- Country: India
- Language: Telugu

Aatmiyudu (transl. Soulmate) is a 1977 Telugu-language drama film, produced by Vadde Sobhanadri under the Vijaya Madhavi Pictures banner and directed by T. Rama Rao. It stars Akkineni Nageswara Rao, Jayachitra and music composed by J. V. Raghavulu.

== Plot ==
Ranga, an orphan, is raised by a millionaire Dharma Rao whom he endears more than his own, and they share a bond beyond. Ranga loves and knits a girl Mahalakshmi. Narasimham & Giri are the vicious Dharma Rao's relatives who ruse to usurp his wealth when Ranga shields him at every level. Meanwhile, Dharma Rao's son Vijay backs from abroad with his family when Dharma Rao entrusts the totality to him but cannot take the dominance and prioritization of Ranga. Moreover, the knaves snare him by knaves, and he affronts Ranga, which Dharma Rao is unable to tolerate. Hence, between two fires, he expels Ranga but turns melancholy to his detachment. Exploiting it, Narasimham & Giri slaughtering Vijay & his wife Sarada incriminates Ranga, and their child, who witnessed the crime, flees. Now the court sentences life Ranga. Plus, the barbaric addict slowly poisons Dharma Rao and acquires authority. Being aware of it, Ranga absconds and, in disguise, safeguards Dharma Rao & his grandson, proving non-guilty and ceasing the baddies. Finally, the movie ends happily with a family reunion.

== Cast ==
- Akkineni Nageswara Rao as Ranga
- Jayachitra as Mahalakshmi
- Rao Gopal Rao as Narasimham
- Satyanarayana as Dharma Rao
- Allu Ramalingaiah as Lingaiah
- Raja Babu as Chinna Rao
- Mohan Babu as Giri
- Murali Mohan as Vijay
- Sakshi Ranga Rao as Bhadraiah
- P. J. Sarma as Dr. Jaganatham
- Kakaraala as Rajaiah
- Jagga Rao
- Madhavi as Latha
- Chhaya Devi as Durga
- Halam as Chitti
- Jayamalini as item number
- Y. Vijaya as Sarada

== Crew ==
- Art: G. V. Subba Rao
- Choreography: Heeralal
- Dialogues: Satyanand
- Lyrics: Acharya Aatreya, Veturi, Gopi
- Playback: S. P. Balasubrahmanyam, P. Susheela
- Music: J. V. Raghavulu
- Editing: G. G. Krishna Rao
- Cinematography: P. S. Selvaraj
- Producer: Vadde Sobhanadri
- Story - Screenplay - Director: T. Rama Rao
- Banner: Vijaya Madhavi Pictures
- Release Date: 1977

== Soundtrack ==
Aatmiyudu

Film score by J. V. Raghavulu
- Released: 1977
- Genre: Soundtrack
- Length: 23:54
- Producer: J. V. Raghavulu

J. V. Raghavulu chronology
Mana Sakshi (1977)	Aatmiyudu (1977)	Bhale Alludu (1977)

Music composed by J. V. Raghavulu.

S. No.	Song title	Lyrics	Singers	length
1	"Allo Mallo"	Acharya Aatreya	S. P. Balasubrahmanyam, P. Susheela	4:12
2	"Binde Meeda"	Veturi	S. P. Balasubrahmanyam, P. Susheela	4:09
3	"Yem Soku"	Veturi	S. P. Balasubrahmanyam, P. Susheela	4:00
4	"Seenanundi Vachavu"	Acharya Aatreya	P. Susheela	4:27
5	"Eyraa"	Gopi	S. P. Balasubrahmanyam, P. Susheela	3:40
6	"Prathi Manishi"	Veturi	S. P. Balasubrahmanyam, P. Susheela	3:26
