= T. V. Kumuthini =

South Indian Tamil actress (1916 – 2000)

T. V. Kumudini
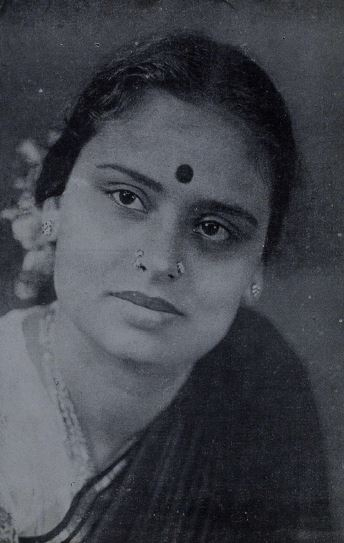
- T. V. Kumudini in the 1940s
- Born: Kalyani Gandhimathi; 13 October 1916; Aathankal, Travancore, India
- Died: 2000 (aged 83–84); Royapettah, Chennai, Tamil Nadu
- Known for: Actress, Singer

T. V. Kumudini (13 October 1916 – 2000) was an Indian actress. She made her debut in the Tamil historical film Mathru Bhoomi in 1939, playing the lead role. She acted in over 100 films in various roles.

== Early life ==
Kumudini's birth name was Kalyani Gandhimathi. She became well-known after playing the character "Kumudini" in the film Mathru Bhoomi, and adopted that name as her stage name, changing it to T. V. Kumudini. She was born on 13 October 1916 in Aathankal, near Thiruvananthapuram. Her father, Veeramani Iyer, died when she was four. She had one younger brother, Harikar Iyer. Kumudini began learning Carnatic music at a young age from Anantha Bhagavathar and Ayyachi Bhagavathar in Thiruvananthapuram. Her debut performance was at the Padmanabhaswamy Temple, where the King of Travancore honored her with a gold medal. Later, her family moved to Madurai, where she married S. V. Venkateshwar Iyer at the age of 13 as his second wife.

In her later years, she resided in "Kumudini Illam," a house in Royapettah, Chennai.

== Film career ==
While in Madurai, she recorded Carnatic beginner lessons with Nagaswami Bhagavathar for His Master's Voice. Following this, some of her solo songs were also released. One of her admirers, singer-actor T. R. Mahalingam, played a key role in introducing her to the film industry. Director H. M. Reddy and ALRM Productions cast her as the lead actress in their film Mathru Bhoomi after obtaining her husband's consent. Narayanan Nair trained her in sword fighting and horse riding for the role. The film was a major success, earning her recognition as T. V. Kumudini. She also sang two songs in the film: "Namadu Janma Bhoomi" and "Annaiyin Kaalil Vilankukalo."

Her second film was Ashok Kumar, released in 1941, where she starred alongside Thyagaraja Bhagavathar. The film further solidified her popularity. She performed duets with Bhagavathar, including "Ullankavarum En Paavai" and "Kidaitha Vaalvidhile."

Later, she was cast opposite M. G. Ramachandran in Saaya in 1941, but MGR was replaced by P. U. Chinnappa, and the film was completed but never released.

Kumudini acted in many other films, including Bhakta Kalathi (1945), Bhakta Jana, and later in supporting roles such as in Auvaiyar (film) and Vietnam Veedu.

Kumudini further honed her Carnatic skills with Subbu of Alandur and performed several concerts on All India Radio, earning accolades.

She also acted in numerous stage dramas with prominent actors like T. S. Baliah, V. S. Raghavan, and Sachu. One notable play was Neerottam. She was also active in radio dramas during the 1940s.

== Awards ==
The Tamil Nadu government honored her with the Kalaimamani Award. She also received titles such as Kalaiselvam, Sangeetha Jyothi, and Veera Vanithai. Kumudini was a committee member of the South Indian Actors' Association.

== Death ==
T. V. Kumudini died in 2000 at the age of 84.

== Filmography ==
- Mathru Bhoomi (1939)
- Ashok Kumar (1941)
- Bhakta Kalathi (1945)
- Sri Murugan (1946)
- Sulochana (1947)
- Sivandha Mann (1969)
- Deivamsam (1973)
