= Bobbili Puli =

- Theatrical release poster
- Directed by: Dasari Narayana Rao
- Written by: Dasari Narayana Rao
- Produced by: Vadde Ramesh
- Starring: N. T. Rama Rao; Sridevi
- Cinematography: K. S. Mani
- Edited by: G. G. Krishna Rao
- Music by: J. V. Raghavulu
- Production company: Vijaya Madhavi Combines
- Release date: 9 July 1982
- Running time: 176 mins
- Country: India
- Language: Telugu
- Budget: ₹3.5 crore

Bobbili Puli (transl. Tiger of Bobbili) is a 1982 Indian Telugu-language action film written and directed by Dasari Narayana Rao. The film stars N. T. Rama Rao and Sridevi, with music composed by J. V. Raghavulu. The film was a big hit, collecting 3.5 Crore in its theatrical run. It was remade in Hindi as Zakhmi Sher (1984).

== Cast ==
- N. T. Rama Rao as Major Chakradhar
- Sridevi as Vijaya
- Rao Gopal Rao as Bhanoji Rao
- Satyanarayana as Acharya Shankaraiah / Satyam
- Allu Ramalingaiah as Bobbili Pilli
- Murali Mohan as Murali
- Prabhakar Reddy as Dr. Rao
- Jaggayya as Inspector Gopinath
- Prasad Babu as Prasad Babu
- Raja as Raja
- Bob Christo as Goon
- Mikkilineni as I.G.
- Mukkamala as Advocate Krishna Murthy
- Rajanala as Rajanala
- Dhulipala as Judge
- Raavi Kondala Rao as Kondala Rao
- Tyagaraju as S.P.
- Vankayala Satyanarayana as Army Officer
- Telephone Satyanarayana as Army Officer
- Chalapathi Rao as Inspector
- Ch. Krishna Murthy as Inspector Krishna Murthy
- Bheema Raju as Bheema Raju
- Jagga Rao as Goon
- Jayachitra as Jyothi
- Ambika as Jayanthi
- Subhashini as item number
- Vijaya Lalitha as item number
- Jyothi Lakshmi as item number
- Jayamalini as item number
- Pushpalatha as Annapurnamma
- Jaya Vijaya as Nurse
- Jayaseela
- Shyamala

== Soundtrack ==
Bobbili Puli

Film score by J. V. Raghavulu
- Released: 1982
- Genre: Soundtrack
- Length: 32:36
- Label: SEA Records
- Producer: J. V. Raghavulu

J. V. Raghavulu chronology
| Intlo Ramayya Veedhilo Krishnayya (1982) | Bobbili Puli (1982) | Eenadu (1982) |

Music composed by J. V. Raghavulu. All songs are evergreen blockbusters. Music released by SEA Records Audio Company.

| S.No | Song title | Lyrics | Singers | length |
|---|---|---|---|---|
| 1 | "Adi Okkato Number Bus" | Veturi | S. P. Balasubrahmanyam, P. Susheela | 5:13 |
| 2 | "Thella Cheeralo" | Dasari Narayana Rao | S. P. Balasubrahmanyam, P. Susheela | 4:36 |
| 3 | Yeddemante | "Veturi" | S. P. Balasubrahmanyam, P. Susheela | 4:41 |
| 4 | "Janani Janmabhoomicha" | Dasari Narayana Rao | S. P. Balasubrahmanyam | 4:43 |
| 5 | "Sambhavam" | Dasari Narayana Rao | S. P. Balasubrahmanyam | 5:02 |
| 6 | "O Subba Rao" | Dasari Narayana Rao | P. Susheela, Vani Jayaram | 8:21 |

== Reception ==
The film had 2 direct 175-day runs, 15 direct 100-day centers and 39 100-days centers including shift, movie collected around 72 Lakhs gross collections in its first week and in full run around 3.5 crores gross. The film also reportedly served as a political tool for NTR, who had started his campaign to become chief minister, and has been attributed as a factor for his victory.

In a 2020 review, Roktim Rajpal of the Deccan Herald praised the film's music, acting and screenplay.
