= Guddi (1971 film) =

- Movie Poster
- Directed by: Hrishikesh Mukherjee
- Screenplay by: Hrishikesh Mukherjee; Gulzar; D. N. Mukherjee
- Story by: Gulzar
- Produced by: Hrishikesh Mukherjee
- Starring: Dharmendra; Jaya Bhaduri; Utpal Dutt; Samit Bhanja; A. K. Hangal; Asrani; Keshto Mukherjee
- Cinematography: Jaywant Pathare
- Music by: Songs: Vasant Desai; Salil Chowdhury; Background Score: Vasant Desai
- Release date: 24 September 1971
- Running time: 120 minutes
- Country: India
- Language: Hindi

Guddi (transl. Doll) is a 1971 Indian Hindi drama film directed by Hrishikesh Mukherjee and written by Gulzar. It starred Dharmendra, Jaya Bhaduri and Utpal Dutt. It is Bachchan's debut and career-making film in which she plays a schoolgirl who has a crush on and is obsessed with the actor Dharmendra, who plays himself. She earned a Filmfare nomination as Best Actress, the only nomination for the film. Dutt also has a starring role. Many Bollywood actors like Dilip Kumar, Amitabh Bachchan, Vinod Khanna, Rajesh Khanna, Naveen Nischol, Asrani, Om Prakash, Pran and Vimi gave guest appearances as themselves. According to Boxofficeindia.com, the film became a "big city hit" and Hit" business everywhere else. It was later remade in Tamil as Cinema Paithiyam (1975) starring Jayachitra and Jayasankar.

== Plot ==
Kusum (aka Guddi) is a spunky and carefree schoolgirl who lives with her father, brother and sister-in-law. Guddi has a crush on film star Dharmendra, whom she regards as a superman who can do no wrong, unable to distinguish between his on-screen image and the real person behind the star.

Nobody knows the extent of her crush until she visits Bombay, where her sister-in-law's brother Navin proposes to her, only to be taken aback when Guddi discloses that she is in love with Dharmendra. Navin discusses the matter with his uncle, who decides that the only solution is to make Guddi realize the difference between illusion and reality.

The uncle contacts Dharmendra through a mutual friend. With his help, they show Guddi the difference between the real world and the make-believe world of cinema. Exposed for the first time to the grime and the cruel and heartless world behind the glamour of cinema, Guddi realizes that nothing is true in the real world. While her respect for Dharmendra grows, Guddi comes to realize that he is just as human as anyone around and lives with his fears and insecurities as anyone else.

The film ends with Guddi agreeing to marry Navin.

== Cast ==
- Dharmendra as Himself
- Jaya Bachchan as Guddi/Kusum
- Sumita Sanyal as Bhabhi
- Utpal Dutt as Professor S. Gupta
- Samit Bhanja as Navin
- A.K. Hangal as Guddi's father
- Asrani as Kundan
- Keshto Mukherjee as Kader Bhai
- Vijay Sharma as Kishan
- Lalita Kumari as Teacher
- Aarti as Tara

The film featured cameos from actors and industry figures including (in order of appearance):

- Dilip Kumar
- Amitabh Bachchan
- Vinod Khanna
- Rajesh Khanna
- Shatrughan Sinha
- Pran
- Om Prakash
- Ashok Kumar
- Naveen Nischol
- Mala Sinha
- Biswajeet
- Hrishikesh Mukherjee (As a director)
- Vimi
- Shashikala
- Deven Verma

== Soundtrack ==
All lyrics are written by Gulzar; all music is composed by Vasant Desai, except noted.

Songs
No.	Title	Singer(s)	Length
1.	"Bole Re Papihara (Raag Miya Ki Malhar)"	Vani Jairam	3:35
2.	"Hari Bin Kaise Jeeun"	Vani Jairam	3:40
3.	"Humko Man Ki Shakti Dena (Raag Kedar)"	Vani Jairam & chorus	4:30
4.	Untitled (not included in soundtrack)
5.	"Pyaar Pyaar Pyaar" (not included in soundtrack)	Mohammad Rafi
6.	"Aaja Re Pardesi (Composed by: Salil Chowdhury)"	Lata Mangeshkar

== Awards and nominations ==
Year	Nominee / work	Award	Result
1972	Jaya Bhaduri	Filmfare Award for Best Actress	Nominated
