= Aalappirandhavan =

1987 film

- Theatrical release poster
- Directed by: A. S. Prakasam
- Written by: A. S. Prakasam
- Produced by: M. K. M Jawahar; Imayam Pragasam
- Starring: Sathyaraj; Ambika; Silk Smitha
- Cinematography: B. S. Lokanath
- Edited by: Natchathiram
- Music by: Ilaiyaraaja
- Production company: Pragaas Productions
- Release date: 10 April 1987
- Country: India
- Language: Tamil

Aalappirandhavan (transl. The man born to rule) is a 1987 Indian Tamil-language action film, written and directed by A. S. Prakasam. The film stars Sathyaraj and Ambika. It was released on 10 April 1987.

== Plot ==
Aalappirandhavan has the extraordinary power of appearing instantaneously at the spot where crimes occur and saving the good people by punishing the bad elements. The actress Ambika falls for his heroism.

== Cast ==
- Sathyaraj as Duraiarasan a.k.a Aalappirandhavan
- Ambika
- Silk Smitha
- Tinku
- Vinu Chakravarthy
- Vennira Aadai Moorthy
- Typist Gopu

== Soundtrack ==
The soundtrack was written and composed by Ilaiyaraaja.

Song	Singers
"Unnayum Ennayum"	K. J. Yesudas, S. Janaki
"Machanukku"	S. Janaki
"Kodikatti"	Malaysia Vasudevan
"Yethivecha"	S. P. Balasubrahmanyam, K. S. Chithra
"Ennal Mudiyathu"	Malaysia Vasudevan

== Release and reception ==
Aalappirandhavan was released on 10 April 1987. The Indian Express said, "With an offbeat storyline that anyhow paves the way only for bloody violence — so common this line of approach has become that even a child would refuse to be impressed — college professor turned filmmaker A. S. Pragasam deserves a pat for attempting to develop on a fresh idea, but his jerky and inane narrative falls between the two stolls of reality and fantasy and sinks in the morass of sheer incapacity."
