= Suryagandhi =

1973 film by Muktha Srinivasan

- DVD cover
- Directed by: Muktha Srinivasan
- Written by: A. S. Prakasam
- Screenplay by: A. S. Prakasam
- Story by: Basumani
- Produced by: M. Venu Gopal
- Starring: R. Muthuraman; Jayalalithaa
- Cinematography: V. Selvaraj
- Edited by: L. Balu
- Music by: M. S. Viswanathan
- Production company: Vidhya Movies
- Release date: 27 July 1973
- Running time: 152 minutes
- Country: India
- Language: Tamil

Suryagandhi (transl. Sunflower) is a 1973 Indian Tamil-language film, directed by Muktha Srinivasan. It stars Jayalalithaa and Muthuraman, with Savithri, Cho Ramaswamy, Moulee, CID Shakuntala and Manorama in supporting roles. The film was released on 27 July 1973. Jayalalitha won the 1973 Tamil Nadu State Film Award for Best Actress and Filmfare Award for Best Actress – Tamil. Muthuraman potrayal as husband who has superiority complex received immersed critical praised.

== Plot ==
Mohan is the eldest son in a middle-class family, having a superiority complex that he should be the first in everything. He and Radha fall in love and they get married. Mohan works in a low wage job despite being a graduate, which is insufficient for the family. So, Radha decides to join as a sales officer and starts working in a company. Her hard work earns her a good name and a promotion. So, her respect in the family rises as it improves the economic status of the family and she is able to fulfill the needs and wants of the family. Mohan is intolerant of Radha's respect growing, and he starts hating her.

Mohan's ego wants him to earn more than Radha and in the process he quits his job with the hope of finding a better one. Meantime, he also does modelling for liquor ads much against his family's wishes. Radha, with the help of her boss, recommends a high paying job for Mohan. But she does not inform this to Mohan as he might not take up the job if he knows that Radha was responsible for it. Mohan quits modelling after he gets the new job and mocks Radha, as he is paid more than her now. Mohan wants Radha to quit her job, but Radha does not agree to that.

Mohan's sister Suseela falls in love with a guy and becomes pregnant. Radha finds this out and arranges for the wedding to be as soon as possible, so that her pre-marital pregnancy is not known to others. Mohan misunderstands that Radha is overpowering him in family decisions and sends Radha out from his home and plans for a divorce. On the day of Suseela's marriage, the groom's father (M. R. R. Vasu) informs the truth to Mohan, which makes him realise his mistakes. Mohan understands that Radha preferred going to the job so that she can pay the dowry demanded by Suseela's in-laws. Mohan also finds out that his job was recommended with the help of Radha. Mohan transforms into a good man and decides to lead a happy life with Radha.

== Cast ==
- Muthuraman as Mohan
- Jayalalitha as Radha
- Cho Ramaswamy as Mahabali
- Manorama as Annam
- T. S. B. K. Moulee as Sama
- Major Sundararajan as Egambaram, Mohan's father
- Savitri as Sivakami, Mohan's mother
- M. R. R. Vasu as Sadhasivam Mudaliyar (Colony owner)
- Gandhimathi as Kamakshi Sadhasivam Mudaliyar's wife
- S. N. Parvathi as Parvathi, Radha's mother
- Sasikumar as Sundaram, Sadhasivam's son
- Senthamarai as Sriram
- Kathadi Ramamoorthy as Ulagesan
- C. I. D. Sakunthala as Usha, Mahabali's wife
- Kannadasan as singer in song "Paramasivan Kazhuthil"
- Rangammal (special appearance in the song "Paramasivan Kazhuthil")

== Production ==
A scene was shot at Newtone Studios. The film marked the acting debuts of Moulee and Srilekha. Kamal Haasan worked under Thangappan as his dance assistant in this film, choreographing the song "O Meri Dilruba".

== Soundtrack ==
The music was composed by M. S. Viswanathan.

Song	Singers	Lyrics	Length
"Paramasivan Kazhuthil"	T. M. Soundararajan	Kannadasan	04:23
"Naan Endral Adhu Avalum"	S. P. Balasubrahmanyam, Jayalalithaa	Vaali	04:34
"O Meri Dilruba"	T. M. Soundararajan, Jayalalithaa	Vaali	04:39
"Theriyaatho Nokku"	Manorama	Vaali	04:22

== Reception ==
Kanthan of Kalki praised the story for being innovative, avoiding the path often taken by Tamil films. Navamani praised the acting, dialogues, music and direction.

== Awards ==
- Won, 1973 Tamil Nadu State Film Award for Best Actress - Jayalalithaa
- Won, Filmfare Award for Best Actress – Tamil - Jayalalithaa
- Won, Madras Filmfans Association Award for Best Actress - Jayalalithaa

== Re-release ==
A digitally restored version of the film was released on 16 September 2016. Baradwaj Rangan of The Hindu compared it to "a YouTube video stretched over the big screen".
