= Bharatha Vilas =

1973 Indian Tamil-language film

- Theatrical release poster
- Directed by: A. C. Thirulokachandar
- Screenplay by: Madurai Thirumaran
- Story by: A. C. Thirulokachandar
- Produced by: A. C. Thirulokachandar
- Starring: Sivaji Ganesan; K. R. Vijaya
- Cinematography: M. Viswanatha Rai
- Edited by: B. Kanthasamy
- Music by: M. S. Viswanathan
- Production company: Cine Bharath Productions
- Release date: 24 March 1973
- Running time: 143 minutes
- Country: India
- Language: Tamil

Bharatha Vilas (/bɑːrəðəvɪlɑːs/ transl. House of Bharat) is a 1973 Indian Tamil-language film co-written and directed by A. C. Thirulokachandar. It stars Sivaji Ganesan and K. R. Vijaya. Many prominent actors from other Indian film industries make guest appearances in a song. It was released on 24 March 1973, and won the Filmfare Award for Best Film – Tamil, while Thirulokachandar won for Best Director – Tamil in the same ceremony.

== Plot ==
Gopal and Gowri are salespeople in competing organisations. They are professional rivals and end up sharing rooms in the same house belonging to an Englishman. Naidu and his Kannada wife are caretakers of the house where they both stay. In due course, Gopal and Gowri get married and quit their jobs on the same day. Naidu and his wife lend them some money to start a business. Gopal's business becomes successful. Gowri and Gopal, are now parents of a son, with another baby on the way.

A Punjabi family led by Baldev Singh move into one of the portions. A Malayalee Muslim led by the Ibrahim family take up residence in another part of the same house. After some initial hiccups, the four families settle down and become close friends. Gopal's secretary Kalaivani tries to entice him and her cunning brother takes a photo of the two of them together. He begins to blackmail Gopal, whose neighbours help him fight the blackmailer off, thus sealing the bond between the families even more strongly. When the house owner decides to sell the house and return to England, the families buy the house together with Gopal paying Naidu's share. They call the house Bharatha Vilas, since it houses people from all parts of the country.

The movie fast-forwards to a few years later, which sees Gopal successful and slightly arrogant about his wealth. His grown-up daughter is very close to Ibrahim's family and she considers Ibrahim's son Hamid as her brother. After receiving an anonymous letter implying wrongly that they are in a relationship, an irate Gopal cuts off all contact with Ibrahim and fixes his daughter's wedding with one of his relatives.

Ibrahim kicks Hamid out of the house, and Hamid joins the army, which is to go to war. He is killed in the war and a letter he wrote before he left for battle makes it clear to Gopal that his daughter and he were just like siblings. Gopal and Ibrahim reconcile. Meanwhile, Gopal's son and Baldev Singh's daughter – who are both medical students – are in love without their parent's knowledge. Gopal suddenly suffers a huge loss in business and is unable to pay the dowry for his daughter. When the groom's family pressures him, his neighbours offer to contribute towards the dowry. Gopal is humbled by their generosity, and he requests Naidu to have his son marry his daughter. Naidu agrees on the condition that Gopal gets his son married to Baldev Singh's daughter. The neighbours finally become one large happy family.

== Cast ==
- Sivaji Ganesan as Gopal
- K. R. Vijaya as Gowri
- Major Sundarrajan as Baldev Singh
- Devika as Gulabhi
- V. K. Ramasamy as Ibrahim Bhai
- Rajasulochana as Sameer
- M. R. R. Vasu as Narasimma Naidu
- Manorama as Meera Bai
- Sivakumar as Shankar
- Jayasudha as Mohini
- Jayachitra as Sundari
- Sasikumar as Ameer
- Jayachandran as Narasimma Naidu's son
- S. V. Ramadas as Gilbert
- J. P. Chandrababu as Doctor
- 'Baby' Sridevi as young Sundari
- Senthamarai as Ramamoorthy
- A. Sakunthala as Kalaivani
- Rajapandiyan as Blackmailer
- Comedy Shanmugan as Punnakku Kadai Punniyakodi
- Karuppu Subbiah as Savuri Kadai Chellamuthu
- Akkineni Nageswara Rao as himself (Guest appearance)
- Sanjeev Kumar as himself (Guest appearance)
- Madhu as himself (Guest appearance)

== Themes ==
Bharatha Vilas revolves around the themes of brotherhood, religious unity and secularism. The song "Indhiya Naadu" featured cameo appearances of actors from various Indian film industries such as Sanjeev Kapoor (Hindi), Akkineni Nageswara Rao (Telugu), Madhu (Malayalam) and Rajkumar (Kannada).

== Soundtrack ==
The music was composed by M. S. Viswanathan, with lyrics by Vaali. The song "Indhiya Naadu" emphasising the "importance of sharing river waters and the significance of national integration".

Song	Singers	Length
"Sakka Podu Podu Raja"	T. M. Soundararajan	03:53
"Min Mini Poochigal"	L. R. Eswari	04:28
"Naapathu Vayasil"	Sivaji Ganesan, P. Susheela	03:54
"Indhiya Naadu"	T. M. Soundararajan, M. S. Viswanathan, K. Veeramani, P. Susheela, L. R. Eswari, Malaysia Vasudevan	05:39

== Reception ==
Kanthan of Kalki appreciated Thirulokachandar's direction and Thirumaran's dialogues. Navamani praised the acting, humour, dialogues and direction. Bharatha Vilas won the Filmfare Award for Best Film – Tamil, and Thirulokachandar won for Best Director – Tamil.
