= Kalyanamam Kalyanam (film) =

- Theatrical release poster
- Directed by: K. Krishnamurthy
- Screenplay by: K. Krishnamurthy
- Story by: Panchu Arunachalam
- Produced by: K. Balakrishnan; S. Kamakshi; R. M. Manikkam
- Starring: Jaishankar; Jayachitra
- Cinematography: Dutt
- Edited by: B. S. Mani
- Music by: Vijaya Bhaskar
- Production company: Geetha Chithra Productions
- Release date: 12 January 1974
- Country: India
- Language: Tamil

Kalyanamam Kalyanam (transl. Marriage is Marriage) is a 1974 Indian Tamil-language comedy film written and directed by K. Krishnamurthy from a story by Panchu Arunachalam. The film stars Jaishankar and Jayachitra. It was released on 12 January 1974.

== Cast ==
- Jaishankar
- Jayachitra
- Cho
- Sukumari
- Srikanth
- Thengai Srinivasan
- Jayakumari
- Pushpamala
- K. A. Thangavelu
- V. S. Raghavan

== Production ==
Latha was initially chosen to portray Jayachitra's sister; however a day before the film's launch, she informed she could not act in the film. During the launch, the producers announced that Jayachitra will play dual roles as siblings. The film's launch saw T. R. Sundaram of Modern Theatres clapping the film while Jayaseelan from the same company switched on the camera. The song "Kalaigal Naan" was picturised on that day.

== Soundtrack ==
The soundtrack was composed by Vijaya Bhaskar.

Track listing
No.	Title	Singers(s)	Length
1.	"Aththaimagan"	L. R. Eswari	3:11
2.	"Ilamai Naattiya"	T. M. Soundararajan, S. Janaki	5:06
3.	"Kaalam Ponnaanathu"	S. P. Balasubrahmanyam	3:26
4.	"Kavithai Naan"	T. M. Soundararajan, L. R. Eswari	3:46
Total length:			15:29

== Release and reception ==
Kalyanamam Kalyanam was released on 12 January 1974, and emerged a commercial success. Kanthan of Kalki said those who did not watch Pattikada Pattanama (1972) would enjoy this. Navamani praised the acting, dialogues, music, humour and direction. The film's success established Arunachalam as a successful screenwriter in Tamil cinema.
