= Chandragupta (play) =

1911 play by Dwijendralal Ray

Chandragupta (Bengali: চন্দ্রগুপ্ত) is the last history play by Dwijendralal Ray, written in 1911. The play, set in ancient kingdom of Magadha, recounts how Chandragupta Maurya, with the help of his faithful minister Chanakya, ascended the throne of Magadha by defeating and subsequently killing his half-brother Nanda. It is one of the most popular plays by Ray. The story of the play is loosely borrowed from the Puranas and the Greek history.

== Sources ==
The play, as Dwijendralal Ray himself cited, was drawn from the Hindu Puranas (possibly the Vishnu Purana) and Greek history. The accounts of Chandraketu and Mura is loosely borrowed from Sanskrit play Mudrarakshasa. The love affair between Chandragupta and Chhaya as well as the sub-plot regarding the story of Antigonus is Ray’s original thoughts.

== Characters ==
- Nanda – King of Magadha.
- Chandragupta – Nanda's half-brother, later Emperor of India.
- Bachal – Nanda's brother-in-law.
- Chanakya – A Brahmin, later Prime Minister of Chandragupta.
- Katyayan – Nanda's minister.
- Chandraketu – King of Malaya.
- Sekendar Shah – Greek Emperor.
- Seleucus – Greek Commander, later Greek King.
- Antigonus – a Greek Commander.
- Helena – Seleucus's daughter, later Empress of India.
- Chhaya – Chandraketu's sister.
- Mura – Chandragupta's mother.

The characters Helena and Chhaya were created by Roy. Other characters appear in historical records or earlier legends, such as Mudrarakshasa.

== Synopsis ==
Chandragupta, the Prince of Magadha, after being overthrown and exiled by his half-brother Nanda, joined Sekendar Shah’s army where Seleucus taught him the art of warfare. Later, with the help of Chandraketu, the young king of Malay, Chanakya, the former Royal Priest and Katyayan, the former Prime Minister of Magadha, Chandragupta defeated and overthrown Nanda who was later put to death by Chankya. Chandraketu’s sister Chhaya fell in love with Chandragupta.

After Sekandar Shah’s death, Seleucus became the emperor of Asia. He appointed Antigonus, an exiled Greek legionary, as the commander of his army. Antigonus fell in love with Seleucus’s daughter Helena, who was already in love with Chandragupta, and was refused by both her and Seleucus, mentioning Antigonus was an illegitimate child. Antigonus went back to Greece and upon questioning his mother, learnt that he was a legal son of none but Seleucus himself.

Later, Seleucus attacked Magadha but was defeated. As a part of the peace treaty signed between Chanakya, new Prime Minister of Magadha and Seleucus, Chandragupta married Helena. Upon learning Chhaya also loved Chandragupta, Helena helped her to marry him, too. Antigonus comes back to India and declared that he is a legal son of Seleucus, and hence Helena’s half-brother and the Chandragupta’s brother-in-law.

== Songs ==
Chandragupta has eight songs, written and composed by Dwijendralal Ray himself. These are:

1. "Tumi He Praner Bnodhu" ("তুমি হে প্রাণের বঁধু") (Act I, Scene iii)
2. "Aay Re Basanta, Tor Kiran-Makha Pakha Tuli" ("আয় রে বসন্ত, তোর কিরণমাখা পাখা তুলি") (Act I, Scene iv)
3. "Jakhan Saghano Gagano Garaje Barashe Kadka Dhara" ("যখন সঘন গগন গরজে বরষে কড়কা ধারা") (Act III, Scene i)
4. "Aar Keno Michhe Asha, Michhe Bhalobasa, Michhe Keno Tnar Bhabana" ("আর কেন মিছে আশা, মিছে ভালবাসা, মিছে কেন তাঁঁর ভাবনা") (Act III, Scene v)
5. "Ghano Tamasabrito Ambaro Dharni" ("ঘন তমসাবৃত অম্বর ধরণী") (Act IV, Scene i)
6. "Aji Gao Mahageet" ("আজি গাও মহাগীত") (Act IV, Scene vi)
7. "Oi Mahasindhur Opar Theke Ki Sangeet Bhese Ase" ("ওই মহাসিন্ধুর ওপার থেকে কি সংগীত ভেসে আসে") (Act V, Scene ii)
8. "Sakal Byathar Byathi Ami Hoi, Tumi Hao Sab Sukher Bhagi" ("সকল ব্যথার ব্যথী আমি হই, তুমি হও সব সুখের ভাগী") (Act V, Scene iii)

According to Sukumar Bandyopadhyay, the songs of this play were highly successful as each of the song has some special significance regarding the story of the play.

== Adaptations ==
The play was adapted into a Tamil film called Mathru Bhoomi (1939) directed by H. M. Reddy.
