= Akkarai Pachai =

- Theatrical release poster
- Directed by: N. Venkatesh
- Written by: A. S. Prakasam
- Produced by: G. K. Dharmarajan
- Starring: Jaishankar; Ravichandran; Nagesh; Lakshmi; Jayachitra
- Cinematography: A. Vincent
- Edited by: G. Venkatraman; T. R. Sekar
- Music by: M. S. Viswanathan
- Production company: Yoga Chitra
- Release date: 19 September 1974
- Running time: 154 minutes
- Country: India
- Language: Tamil

Akkarai Pachai (transl. The grass is greener on the other side) is a 1974 Indian Tamil-language film directed by N. Venkatesh and written by A. S. Prakasam. The film stars Jaishankar, Ravichandran, Nagesh, Lakshmi and Jayachitra. It was released on 19 September 1974.

== Plot ==
Two highly educated women continuously find fault with their respective husbands. Their behavior puts immense strain on their relationships, driving the central conflict of the story exploring the themes of domestic harmony, ego, and the challenges of realistic expectations in marriage.

== Cast ==
- Jaishankar
- Ravichandran
- Nagesh
- Lakshmi
- Jayachitra
- Savitri
- Rajasree

== Production ==
The song "Oorkolam Pogindra" was shot in Salem for which 100 parrots bought from Chennai were used in the song. Some scenes were shot at Yercaud.

== Soundtrack ==
The music was composed by M. S. Viswanathan, with lyrics by Kannadasan. The song "Ikkaraikku Akkarai Pachai" attained popularity.

Track listing
No.	Title	Singer(s)	Length
1.	"Oorgolam Pokindra"	S. P. Balasubrahmanyam, L. R. Eswari	4:29
2.	"Arasanai Paartha Kannukku"	T. M. Soundararajan, L. R. Anjali	4:11
3.	"Pothigai Malai Santhaname"	P. Susheela	4:36
4.	"Elladha Porul Meedhu"	M. S. Viswanathan	3:06
5.	"Ikkaraikku Akkarai Pachai"	M. S. Viswanathan	4:29
Total length:			20:51

== Release and reception ==
Akkarai Pachai was released on 19 September 1974. Kalki felt that, by not focusing on character development, the screenplay ruined itself, but praised the performances of the lead cast, and Prakasam's dialogues.
