= Thirumalai Thenkumari =

1970 film by A. P. Nagarajan

- Poster
- Directed by: A. P. Nagarajan
- Written by: A. P. Nagarajan
- Produced by: C. Paramasivan
- Starring: Sivakumar; Kumari Padmini; Sirkazhi Govindarajan; Manorama; Suruli Rajan; Gandhimathi; Rama Prabha; Shylashri
- Cinematography: W. R. Subba Rao
- Edited by: T. Vijayarangam
- Music by: Kunnakudi Vaidyanathan
- Production company: Sri Vijayalakshmi Pictures
- Release date: 15 August 1970
- Country: India
- Language: Tamil

Thirumalai Thenkumari (transl. Tirupati and Kanyakumari) is a 1970 Indian Tamil-language comedy road film written and directed by A. P. Nagarajan. Inspired by the 1969 film If It's Tuesday, This Must Be Belgium, it features an ensemble cast consisting of Sivakumar, Kumari Padmini, Rama Prabha, Shylashri, Manorama, Sirkazhi Govindarajan and Suruli Rajan. The film focuses on a group of passengers who embark on a pilgrimage across South India. It was released on 15 August 1970, emerged a commercial success, and won three Tamil Nadu State Film Awards.

== Plot ==
Around a dozen families from different walks of life, different age groups and different linguistic background unite for a pilgrimage, beginning with Tirupati and going as far as Kanyakumari. At each place, they stop at a pilgrimage site to fulfill their prayers. At each spot, a family is faced with a challenge that falls upon them due to their forgetfulness or irresponsibility and a reminder of such is provided.

== Cast ==
Actors

- Sivakumar as Sekar
- Sirkazhi Govindarajan as Siva Chidambara Bhagvathar
- Suruli Rajan as Mannaru
- K. D. Santhanam as Chokkalingam
- Typist Gopu as Velu
- Gopalakrishnan as Prohit
- Master Prabhakar as Ramani
- A. K. Veerasamy
- A. Sasikumar as Mohan
- Chandran Babu as Kumar
- Haranath
- Ramamurthy

Actresses

- Kumari Padmini as Geetha
- Rama Prabha as Saroja Mohan
- A. Sakunthala as Lalitha
- Manorama as Muniyamma
- Gandhimathi as Ramani's grandmother
- Shylashri
- Vasantha
- Nalina
- Usharani
- P. Seethalakshmi as Rajeswari
- S. N. Parvathy
- Nirmalamma

== Production ==
Thirumalai Thenkumari was among the earliest road films in Tamil cinema, and took inspiration from the 1969 film If It's Tuesday, This Must Be Belgium. Unlike the original, it was given a "religious twist", with its premise focusing on a group of passengers who embark on a pilgrimage across South India, visiting places like Tirupati and Madurai. The film was actually shot in the places depicted onscreen, as opposed to using sets. Since it was previously believed in the Tamil film industry that screenwriter-director A. P. Nagarajan's films were successful only because of their star casts and "mammoth" scales, rather than his directorial skills, he made this film, which featured mostly newcomers, to silence his critics. Cinematography was handled by W. R. Subba Rao, the art direction by Ganga, and the editing by T. Vijayarangam. The film, which was produced by C. Paramasivan under the banner Sree Vijayalakshmi Pictures, was completed within a month.

== Soundtrack ==
The soundtrack was composed by Kunnakudi Vaidyanathan. He based the song "Thirupathi Malaivaazhum" on the Suprabhatam. The song "Madhurai Arasaalum" is a ragamalika, i.e. set in multiple Carnatic ragas. "Thirupathi Malaivaazhum" and "Madhurai Arasaalum" were written by Ulundurpettai Shanmugam.

Track listing
No.	Title	Singer(s)	Length
1.	"Azhage Thamizhe Nee"	Sirkazhi Govindarajan, Sarala, M. R. Vijaya, L. R. Eshwari, Manorama, Dharapuram Sundararajan, L. R. Anjali, A. L. Raghavan	6:15
2.	"Guruvayoorappa"	Sirkazhi Govindarajan	3:34
3.	"Kaliyaatha Kalviyum"	Sirkazhi Govindarajan	2:55
4.	"Madhurai Arasaalum"	Sirkazhi Govindarajan, L. R. Eswari, M. R. Vijaya	5:49
5.	"Sinthanaiyil Medaikatti"	Sirkazhi Govindarajan, Sarala	3:16
6.	"Thiralmani Kathirgaland Neelakkada"	Sirkazhi Govindarajan, L. R. Eswari	4:09
7.	"Thirupathi Malaivaazhum"	Sirkazhi Govindarajan	3:20
Total length:			29:18

== Release and reception ==
Thirumalai Thenkumari was released on 15 August 1970. The film was a commercial success, and won in three categories at the Tamil Nadu State Film Awards: Best Music Director (Kunnakudi Vaidyanathan), Best Male Playback Singer (Sirkazhi Govindarajan), and a Special Prize.
