= Dorababu =

- Theatrical release poster
- Directed by: T. Rama Rao
- Written by: Gopi (dialogues)
- Screenplay by: T. Rama Rao
- Story by: Gollapudi Maruti Rao
- Produced by: J. Subba Rao; G. Rajendra Prasad
- Starring: Akkineni Nageswara Rao; Manjula
- Cinematography: P. S. Selvaraj
- Edited by: K. A. Martahnd
- Music by: J. V. Raghavulu
- Production company: Phani Madhavi Combines
- Release date: 31 October 1974
- Running time: 163 mins
- Country: India
- Language: Telugu

Dorababu is a 1974 Telugu-language action film, produced by J. Subba Rao, G. Rajendra Prasad under the Phani Madhavi Combines banner and directed by T. Rama Rao. It stars Akkineni Nageswara Rao, Manjula and music composed by J. V. Raghavulu.

== Cast ==
- Akkineni Nageswara Rao as Dorababu / Chandram
- Manjula as Anuradha
- Chandrakala as Lakshmi
- Satyanarayana as Bhujangam
- Jaggayya as Jailor
- Gummadi as Ramanadham
- Raja Babu as Simhadri / Madhu
- Giri Babu as Shankar
- Rao Gopal Rao as S.P.
- D. Ramanaidu as Prasad
- Sakshi Ranga Rao
- Mada as Prisoner

== Crew ==
- Art: G. V. Subba Rao
- Choreography: Heeralal
- Fights: Raghavulu
- Dialogues: Gopi
- Lyrics: C. Narayana Reddy, Acharya Aatreya, Dasaradhi, Cherupu Anjineeya Sastry, Gopi
- Playback: Ghantasala, V. Ramakrishna, P. Susheela
- Music: J. V. Raghavulu
- Story: Gollapudi Maruti Rao
- Editing: K. A. Martahnd
- Cinematography: P. S. Selvaraj
- Producer: J. Subba Rao, G. Rajendra Prasad
- Screenplay - Director: T. Rama Rao
- Banner: Phani Madhavi Combines
- Release Date: 1974

== Soundtrack ==
Dorababu

Film score by J. V. Raghavulu
- Released: 1974
- Genre: Soundtrack
- Length: 20:30
- Producer: J. V. Raghavulu

Music composed by J. V. Raghavulu. Music released on Audio Company.

S. No.	Song title	Lyrics	Singers	length
1	"Ammammo Ee Guntadu"	Acharya Aatreya	V. Ramakrishna, P. Susheela	4:14
2	"Neeku Naaku Pellante"	Gopi	V. Ramakrishna, P. Susheela	4:37
3	"Raaraa Maa Intiki"	C. Narayana Reddy	Ghantasala, P. Susheela	4:17
4	"Devudela Untaadani"	Dasaradhi	Ghantasala, P. Susheela	3:35
5	"Ontariga Unnanu"	Cherupu Anjineeya Sastry	V. Ramakrishna, P. Susheela	3:47

== Other ==
- VCDs and DVDs on - SHALIMAR Video Company, Hyderabad
