= Brahmachari Mogudu =

Bramhachari Mogudu
- DVD Cover
- Directed by: Relangi Narasimha Rao
- Written by: Shankarmanchi Pardhasaradhi (dialogues)
- Screenplay by: Relangi Narasimha Rao; Shankarmanchi Pardhasaradhi
- Story by: Relangi Narasimha Rao; Shankarmanchi Pardhasaradhi
- Produced by: Battina Venkata Krishna Reddy
- Starring: Rajendra Prasad; Yamuna
- Cinematography: M. Nagendra Kumar
- Edited by: B. Krishnam Raju
- Music by: J. V. Raghavulu
- Production company: Sri Sai Madhavi Arts
- Release date: 1994
- Running time: 138 mins
- Country: India
- Language: Telugu

Brahmachari Mogudu (transl. Bachelor Husband) is a 1994 Telugu-language comedy film, produced by Battina Venkata Krishna Reddy under the Sri Sai Madhavi Arts banner and directed by Relangi Narasimha Rao. It stars Rajendra Prasad, Yamuna and music composed by J. V. Raghavulu. The film was recorded as a flop at the box office.

== Cast ==
- Rajendra Prasad as Rambabu
- Yamuna as Jayalakshmi
- Satyanarayana as Madhavaiah
- Giri Babu as Kutumba Rao
- Brahmanandam as Gundubogula Gurunadham
- Nagesh as Retired Army Colonel
- Dharmavarapu Subramanyam as Taxi Ramudu
- Suthi Velu as Panthulu
- Annapurna as Savitri
- Srilakshmi as Kamakshi / Kamudu
- Disco Shanthi as Rani
- Annuja as Bhagyalakshmi
- Dubbing Janaki as Shantamma
- Kalpana Rai as Kutumba Rao's Neighbour
- Y. Vijaya as Satya
- Tirupathi Prakash
- Juttu Narasimhan

== Soundtrack ==
Bramhachari Mogudu

Film score by J. V. Raghavulu
- Released: 1993
- Genre: Soundtrack
- Length: 24:07
- Label: AKASH Audio
- Producer: J. V. Raghavulu

J. V. Raghavulu chronology
Pellaniki Premalekha Priyuraliki Subhalekha (1992)	Bramhachari Mogudu (1993)	Ooha (1996)

Music composed by J. V. Raghavulu. Lyrics were written by Bhuvana Chandra. Music released on AKASH Audio Company.

No.	Title	Singer(s)	Length
1.	"Chigurakulalona"	S. P. Balasubrahmanyam, Chitra	4:32
2.	"Kamunipatnam"	S. P. Balasubrahmanyam, Chitra	5:21
3.	"Aha Mutyala"	Chitra	4:44
4.	"Pattanu Guru"	Chitra	4:22
5.	"Kashmora"	S. P. Balasubrahmanyam, Ramana	5:08
Total length:			24:07

== Other ==
- VCDs and DVDs on - SHALIMAR Video Company, Hyderabad
