= Justice Gopinath =

- Theatrical release poster
- Directed by: D. Yoganand
- Screenplay by: Vietnam Veedu Sundaram
- Story by: Nannu Chandra
- Produced by: Kay Cee; K. Sivasankaran
- Starring: Sivaji Ganesan; K. R. Vijaya; Rajinikanth; Sumithra
- Cinematography: Viswanatha Rai
- Edited by: R. Vittal; T. K. Rajan
- Music by: M. S. Viswanathan
- Production company: Vallimanalan Pictures
- Release date: 16 December 1978
- Running time: 115 minutes
- Country: India
- Language: Tamil

Justice Gopinath is a 1978 Indian Tamil-language film directed by D. Yoganand. The film stars Sivaji Ganesan, K. R. Vijaya, Rajinikanth and Sumithra. It was released on 16 December 1978 and became a box office failure.

== Plot ==
Justice Gopinath is a man known for his rigid upholding of the law and honesty. His wife Radha is pregnant, but she gets an accident, resulting in the child being stillborn. One case that comes up before Gopinath is that of Murugan, who has been charged with assault and battery. Misled by false evidence, Gopinath sentences Murugan to imprisonment. Murugan's wife commits suicide, fearing the advances of the local landlord, and her infant son Ravi is orphaned. Gopinath conceals Ravi's true identity from him and raises him as his own son.

Ravi grows up to become a lawyer. He falls in love with a woman named Uma, and they decide to marry. Meanwhile, Murugan is released from prison and searches for his son. Though beseeched by Radha not to do so, Gopinath is unable to lie and reveals to Ravi the truth about his parentage. Uma's father is later revealed to be the man responsible for falsifying the evidence that led to Murugan's imprisonment. Ravi takes care of everything and brings things to a satisfactory conclusion.

== Cast ==
- Sivaji Ganesan as Justice Gopinath
- K. R. Vijaya as Radha
- Rajinikanth as Ravi
- Sumithra as Uma
- Major Sundarrajan as Murugan
- A. Sakunthala as Valli
- Thengai Srinivasan as Bhadrachalam

== Production ==
Justice Gopinath was the first film where Rajinikanth acted alongside his idol, Sivaji Ganesan.

== Soundtrack ==
All songs were written by Vaali and composed by M. S. Viswanathan.

Title	Singer(s)	Length
"Ada Ennanga Ithu"	Vani Jairam, T. M. Soundararajan	4:31
"Naana Sonnen Theerppu"	T. M. Soundararajan	3:54
"Namadhu Kaadhal"	S. P. Balasubrahmanyam, Vani Jairam	4:28
"Adiye Nee"	Malaysia Vasudevan, L. R. Eswari	3:52

== Reception ==
Kausikan of Kalki felt the character of Justice Gopinath was not on par with other roles done by Ganesan; however he praised the acting of Vijaya and Rajinikanth.

== Bibliography ==
- Ramachandran, Naman (2014) [2012]. Rajinikanth: The Definitive Biography. New Delhi: Penguin Books. ISBN 978-0-14-342111-5.
