= J. V. Raghavulu =

- Also known as: Raghavulu
- Born: Jetti Veera Raghavulu; 1931; Ramachandrapuram, East Godavari district, India
- Died: 7 June 2013 (aged 81–82)
- Occupations: Singer, Music composer
- Instrument: Vocalist
- Years active: 1960–1990

Jetti Veera Raghavulu (1931 – 7 June 2013), better known as J. V. Raghavulu, was an eminent Indian music director and playback singer. He started as playback singer and became a music director after the sudden death of Ghantasala. He made his screen debut in Drohi (1970), a film by Suresh Productions. He scored music to about 172 films.

== Career ==
He belonged to an agricultural family in Ramachandrapuram, East Godavari district. His parents were Veeraswami Naidu and Adilaxmi. He was one of the six siblings. He learned acting and singing from Bhadracharyulu who used to organize Harischandra play. He gave him chance to act as Lohitasudu in the play. He used to study in the school and act in the plays touring different places. Famous poets Indraganti Hanumachastri and Vedula Satyanarayana Sastry were his school teachers. Their poems used to be broadcast in All India Radio, Vijayawada. They encouraged him to sing these poems. He tuned and voiced many songs written by them and other writers in "Geetavali" programme. In one of the recording sessions, popular singer Ghantasala heard him singing a light song. Impressed by his voice, he invited Raghavulu to the films. He completed S.S.L.C.

Leaving studies and without informing the parents, he left home, reached Madras and worked under Ghantasala for long time. He was there with him from early morning to late night learning the nuances of playback singing and composing music. Ghantasala used to look after him as his son. He sang "Baito Baito Pellikodaka" in Pelli Sandadi (1959) film for Chalam. He used to look after the composition of the songs for many films. He also worked with K. V. Mahadevan and M. S. Viswanathan for sometime.

Vadde Brothers (Sobhanadri, Ramesh (Father of Hero Vadde Naveen), Kishore) under "Vijaya Madhavi Pictures/Combines" banner as Production house made J. V. Raghavulu their "Aasthana Sangeeta Darshakudu" (Music Director of House) beginning with Aatmiyudu film in 1977 and continued through Katakataala Rudraiah, Rangoon Rowdy, Bebbuli till 1982 Bobbili Puli and further.

He composed thousands of songs. His memorable songs include Janani Janmabhoomischa (Bobbili Puli), Veena Naadi Teega Needi Teegachatu Raagamundi, Tarangini O Tarangini, Ee Jeevana Tarangalalo (Jeevana Tarangalu) and many others.

He was married to Ramanamma. They had four sons (Venkateswar Rao, Bhaskar, Shyam Kumar and Ravi Kumar) and a daughter (Lakshmi). Ravi Raghav has also worked as a music composer, working for the low budget Tamil films, Villalan, Muthal Thagaval Arikkai and En Oviya.

== Filmography ==
=== As a playback singer ===
Year	Film	Language	Song	Music director	Co-singer
1956	Sonta Ooru	Telugu	Vennela Viruyunura	Ghantasala	Jikki
1957	Sati Anasuya	Telugu	Ide Nyayama Ide Dharmama	Ghantasala	Ghantasala & Madhavapeddi Satyam
1958	Sobha	Telugu	Le Le Le	A. M. Rajah	S. Janaki
1958	Sobha	Telugu	Velugeleni Eelokana	A. M. Rajah	Jikki
1959	Pelli Sandadi	Telugu	Baito Baito Pellikodakaa	Ghantasala	Jikki
1959	Vachina Kodalu Nachindi			S. Dakshinamurthi	
1960	Abhimanam	Telugu	Mandhini Ninnu	Ghantasala	Madhavapeddi Satyam
1960	Bhakta Raghunath	Telugu	Rama Hare Krishna Hare	Ghantasala	
1960	Bhakta Raghunath	Telugu	Konda Meeda	Ghantasala	Jikki
1960	Deepavali	Telugu	Poonivoi Tata	Ghantasala	A. P. Komala
1960	Kadeddulu Ekaram Nela		Yaduntive Pilla	C. M. Raju	P. S. Vaidehi
1961	Jagadeka Veeruni Katha			Pendyala Nageswara Rao	
1962	Gaali Gopura	Kannada	Dhooliyayithu Gaali Gopura	T. G. Lingappa	
1962	Gaali Medalu	Telugu	Gaali Maeda Koolipoyera	T. G. Lingappa	
1962	Tiger Ramudu	Telugu	Danpathulu	Ghantasala	
1963	Lava Kusa	Kannada	Jaya Jaya Raam.... Sree Raamaa Parandhaamaa	Ghantasala	P. Leela, P. Susheela, K. Rani & P. S. Vaidehi
1963	Lava Kusa	Kannada	Vallenolli Maavaa Neena Magalani	Ghantasala	Pithapuram Nageswara Rao, Jikki & K. Rani
1963	Lava Kusa	Kannada	Ashvamedha Yagaaikkeega Jayamu	Ghantasala	Ghantasala, Madhavapeddi Satyam & P. S. Vaidhegi
1963	Lava Kusa	Tamil	Jeya Jeya Raam.... Sree Raamaa Parandhaamaa	Ghantasala & K. V. Mahadevan	P. Leela, P. Susheela, K. Rani & K. Jamuna Rani
1963	Lava Kusa	Tamil	Vetri Murasu Olikka Seiyyum	Ghantasala & K. V. Mahadevan	Ghantasala, Thiruchi Loganathan, K. Rani, K. Jamuna Rani & Seerkazhi Govindarajan
1963	Lava Kusa	Telugu	Jaya Jaya Raam.... Sree Raamaa Parandhaamaa	Ghantasala	P. Leela, P. Susheela, K. Rani & P. S. Vaidehi
1963	Lava Kusa	Telugu	Vollanori Maamaa Nee Pillani	Ghantasala	Ghantasala, Jikki & K. Rani
1963	Lava Kusa	Telugu	Ashvamedha Yagaaniki Jayamu	Ghantasala	Ghantasala, Madhavapeddi Satyam & P. S. Vaidehi
1963	Valmiki	Telugu	Pothanantade	Ghantasala	A. P. Komala & Madhavapeddi Satyam
1963	Valmiki	Telugu	Tallalene Tallalene	Ghantasala	A. P. Komala
1964	Kai Kodutha Deivam	Tamil	Sindhu Nadhiyin Misai	Viswanathan–Ramamoorthy	T. M. Soundararajan & L. R. Eswari
1964	Sri Satyanarayana Mahathyam	Telugu	Oho Oho Chandamama	Ghantasala	Swarnalatha
1966	Aggi Barata	Telugu	Cham Cham Gurram	Vijaya Krishna Murthy	L. R. Eswari & Basaweswar
1966	Paramanandayya Sishyula Katha	Telugu	Parama Gurudu Cheppinavadu	Ghantasala	Pithapuram Nageswara Rao, K. Chakravarthy, Bhadram & Krishna Murthy
1966	Shakuntala	Telugu	Paathaa Kaalam Naati	Ghantasala	Madhavapeddi Satyam & Pithapuram Nageswara Rao
1967	Prana Mithrulu	Telugu		K. V. Mahadevan	
1967	Rahasyam	Telugu		Ghantasala	
1967	Sri Krishnavataram	Telugu		T. V. Raju	
1967	Stree Janma			Ghantasala	
1968	Govula Gopanna	Telugu	Ee Virithotala	Ghantasala	Ghantasala, P. Susheela & Bangalore Latha
1969	Bandipotu Dongalu		O Kannayya Puttina Roju	Pendyala Nageswara Rao	Ghantasala & P. Susheela
1970	Sambarala Rambabu	Telugu	Vinnaaraa Vinnaaraa	V. Kumar	P. Leela, Madhavapeddi Satyam, K. Jamuna Rani, K. Swarna & Pithapuram Nageswara Rao
1971	Neerum Neruppum	Tamil	Virundho Nalla Virundhu	M. S. Viswanathan	K. Veeramani, Pattom Sadan, L. R. Eswari, T. A. Mothi & Pithapuram Nageswara Rao
1971	Sampoorna Ramayanam	Telugu		K. V. Mahadevan	
1972	Beedala Patlu	Telugu	Dabbu Lone Unnadira	K. V. Mahadevan	Ghantasala & P. B. Sreenivas
1973	Andala Ramudu	Telugu	Maa Thalli Godavari	K. V. Mahadevan	V. Ramakrishna
1973	Andala Ramudu	Telugu	Chakirevu Baana Emandi	K. V. Mahadevan	V. Ramakrishna
1977	Manassakshi	Telugu	Vidhi Chesede Nirnayam	J. V. Raghavulu	

=== As an assistant music director ===
- 1971 Prema Nagar

=== As a music director ===
Telugu
. 1968 manassakshi

- 1969 Bommalu Cheppina Katha (along with Master Venu)
- 1970 Drohi
- 1973 Jeevana Tarangalu
- 1974 Dorababu
- 1976 Aadavaallu Apanindalu
- 1977 Aatmeeyudu
- 1977 Bhale Alludu
- 1978 Katakataala Rudraiah
- 1979 Evvadabba Sommu
- 1979 Allari vayasu
- 1979 Cheyyethi Jai Kottu
- 1979 Naa Illu Naa Vaallu
- 1979 Rangoon Rowdy
- 1979 Kothala Raayudu
- 1980 Shivamettina Satyam
- 1980 Bebbuli
- 1980 Samsara Bandham
- 1980 Love in Singapore
- 1980 Mogudu Kaavali
- 1981 guvvala janta
- 1981 Shri Anjaneya Charitra
- 1981 Babulugaadi Debba
- 1982 Bobbili Puli
- 1982 Kalahala Kapuram
- 1982 Eenadu
- 1982 Intlo Ramayya Veedhilo Krishnayya
- 1982 Tarangini
- 1983 Mukku Pudaka
- 1983 Police Venkataswamy
- 1983 Maa Inti Premayanam
- 1983 Simhapuri Simham
- 1983 Praja Rajyam
- 1984 Raraju
- 1984 Bharatamlo Shankharavam
- 1984 Devanthakudu
- 1985 Intiko Rudramma
- 1985 Tirugubatu
- 1985 Kalyana Tilakam
- 1985 moodilla muchchata
- 1986 Ravana Brahma
- 1987 Brahma Nayudu
- 1987 Viswanatha Nayakudu
- 1987 Chaitanya Ratham
- 1989 Balipeethampai Bharata Naari
- 1989 Chalaki Mogudu Chadastapu Pellam
- 1989 Viyyalavari Vindhu
- 1990 20va Sathabdam
- 1991 Iddaru Pellala Muddula Police
- 1991 Amma Kadupu Challanga
- 1991 Edurinti Mogudu Pakkinti Pellam
- 1993 Sarasaala Soggaadu
- 1994 Brahmachari Mogudu
- 1996 Ooha
- 1986 Dharmapeetham Daddarillindi

Tamil

- 1972 Kadhalikka Vanga
