= A. S. Prakasam =

Indian film director and playwright

Kalaimamani A. S. Prakasam
- Other name: Perasiriyar
- Occupations: Film director Screenwriter; Playwright
- Awards: Kalaimamani Award (1992)

A. S. Prakasam (/prəkɑːsəm/) is an Indian film director, screenwriter and playwright who works in Tamil cinema.

== Personal Life ==
Prakasam was originally a professor at Pachaiyappa's College, and Kandasamy College, Chennai. He made his feature film debut with writing the story of Kannan En Kadhalan (1968), and his directorial debut with Pattampoochi (1975). A film he wrote, Ezhu Jenmangal directed by A. C. Tirulokchandar, never released. As of 1987, Prakasam was part of the Tamil Film Producers Council. Though frequently publicised with the prefix "Perasiriyar" (Professor), he has repeatedly expressed his disapproval of being referred to as such.

== Career ==
Prakasam consciously sought to avoid borrowing stories from American films; instead, he has hoped his original stories would reach Hollywood. Prakasam professed to borrowing his stories from street level, hoping that people such as neighbours can relate to them.

== Awards ==
- 1992: Received title of Kalaimamani Award by the Government of Tamil Nadu, which is the highest state honour in the field of Arts

== Filmography ==
=== Writer ===
Year	Film	Notes
1968	Kannan En Kadhalan	
1972	Puguntha Veedu	
1973	Suryagandhi	
1974	Paruva Kaalam	
1974	Akkarai Pachai	
1975	Cinema Paithiyam	
1975	Piriya Vidai	
1978	Andaman Kadhali	
1979	Imayam	
1985	Raja Rishi	

=== Director ===
Year	Film	Notes
1975	Pattampoochi	
1980	Othayadi Paathayilae	
1982	Echchil Iravugal	
1983	Aayiram Nilave Vaa	
1986	Saadhanai	
1987	Aalappirandhavan	

== Bibliography ==
- Suratha (1977). சொன்னார்கள் [Sayings] (PDF) (in Tamil). Suratha Pathippagam. p. 111.
