= Sabitha Engira Sabapathi =

- Genre: Soap opera
- Based on: Comedy fiction
- Directed by: Gopi.R
- Starring: Pandu; Nithya Ravinder; CID Sakunthala; Shanmuga Sundaram
- Theme music composer: Saravanan
- Composers: Anuradha Sriram; C.K. Ganeshan; Madhumathi
- Original language: Tamil
- No. of seasons: 1
- No. of episodes: 76

Production
- Producer: Sri Barati
- Cinematography: Kumar; Sankhar; Ravi Sundaram
- Editor: Mohan
- Camera setup: Multi-camera
- Running time: approx. 20-22 minutes per episode
- Production company: Sri Barati Associate Digital Studios

Original release
- Network: Raj TV
- Release: 4 January 2015 – 2 April 2016

Sabitha Engira Sabapathi (transl. Sabitha Alias Sabapathi) is a 2015 Indian Tamil-language soap opera starring Pandu, Nithya, CID Sakunthala, Shanmuga Sundaram and Priyanka. It aired Monday to Friday at 6:30PM IST on Raj TV from 4 January 2015 to 2 April 2016 for 75 episodes.

== Cast ==
Main cast

- Pandu
- Nithya Ravindran
- A. Sakunthala
- Shanmugasundaram

Additional Cast

- Sai Sakthi
- Vettri Velan
- Rajan
- Nagalaskhmi
- Sangeetha Balan
- Manikandha Raju
- Ranganathan
- Ekavalli
- Priyanka
- Mohana
- Kalavani Devi
- Priya
- Devika Shree
- Palraj
- C.S. Rajan

== International broadcast ==
- Raj TV US
- TET
