= Katakatala Rudrayya =

Katakataala Rudrayya
- Promotional poster
- Directed by: Dasari Narayana Rao
- Written by: Dasari Narayana Rao
- Produced by: Vadde Shobhanadri
- Starring: Krishnam Raju; Jayasudha; Ramakrishna; Jayachitra
- Music by: J. V. Raghavulu
- Production company: Vijaya Madhavi Pictures
- Release date: 11 October 1978
- Country: India
- Language: Telugu

Katakatala Rudrayya is a 1978 Indian Telugu-language film written and directed by Dasari Narayana Rao. It stars Krishnam Raju, Jayasudha, Ramakrishna and Jayachitra. The film features music composed by J. V. Raghavulu. It was remade in Tamil as Pattakkathi Bhairavan (1979) with Sivaji Ganesan and in Hindi as Jyoti Bane Jwala (1980) with Jeetendra.

== Cast ==
- Krishnam Raju
- Jayasudha
- Ramakrishna
- Jayachitra
- Jamuna
- Kaikala Satyanarayana
- Rao Gopal Rao
- Prabhakar Reddy
- J. V. Ramana Murthi

== Reception ==
=== Critical reception ===
Griddaluru Gopalrao writing for Zamin Ryot on 27 October 1978 opined that the film was cut off from reality, and would remain as "an old coin which is no longer a legal tender." He added that the screenplay by Dasari and soundtrack composed by Raghavulu are forgettable.

=== Box office ===
Katakataala Rudrayya and Mana Voori Pandavulu were released within a gap of 10 days. The film was a blockbuster at the box office.
