= Theekkathir =

Tamil newspaper

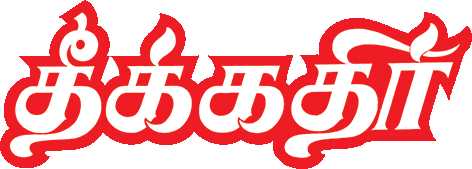
- Type: Daily newspaper
- Owner: Toiling Masses Welfare Trust Tamil Nadu
- Publisher: M.N.S.Venkataraman
- Editor-in-chief: Ramalingam C
- Founded: 29 June 1963
- Language: Tamil
- Headquarters: Chennai, Tamil Nadu
- Website: theekkathir.in epaper.theekkathir.org

Theekkathir is a Tamil newspaper ran by Toiling Masses Welfare Trust Tamil Nadu. Theekkathir is being published from Madurai, Chennai, Coimbatore and Tiruchirappalli.

== History ==
In 1963, Theekkathir was started as a weekly from Chennai with the fund collected by Coimbatore mill workers. Its first editor was Arputhasamy, fondly called as Appu.

Theekkathir was launched in 1966 at (Nadesan Road) Chennai. Its regular edition was launched in 1969 at Madurai and became a daily newspaper in 1971.

The paper's second edition started from Chennai in 1993. Its third edition started from Coimbatore in 2007. The fourth edition from Tiruchirappalli was launched as a conclusion of the August campaign.
