= C. I. D. Sakunthala =

Indian actress (1939–2024)

A. Sakunthala
- Born: Arunachalam Sakunthala; 1939 or 1940; Salem, Madras Province, British India (now Tamil Nadu, India)
- Died: 17 September 2024 (aged 84-85); Bengaluru, Karnataka, India
- Other name: C.I.D Sakunthala
- Citizenship: Indian
- Occupations: Actress, dancer
- Notable work: CID Shankar; Thavaputhalvan; Karunthel Kannayiram; Vasantha Maligai; Idhaya Veenai
- Television: Sabitha Engira Sabapathi; Kasthuri; Tamil Selvi
- Awards: Kalaimamani Award (2006)

Arunachalam Sakunthala (1 November 1939 – 17 September 2024), also known as C. I. D. Sakunthala, was an Indian actress. She appeared as a heroine, item number dancer, and villainess in over 600 Tamil, Telugu, Kannada and Malayalam films. The first film in which she performed as an actress was CID Shankar, following which she was referred to as "C. I. D. Sakunthala". After that, Sakunthala became more popular. It was a Tamil thriller which was released on 1 May 1970, directed by R Sundaram. In the movie 'Thavaputhalvan', she played a ruthless villain seeking revenge against Sivaji Ganesan.

== Early life ==
Sakunthala's native is Arisipalayam, Salem. Her parents named her after an old Tamil movie Sakuntalai. Her father Arunachalam was employed at Thiruverumbur. She learned to dance and danced at a show hosted by Lalitha - Padmini - Ragini in Chennai. Thereafter, she gradually entered the cinema industry. She acted in a play “Suriyan Merkkeyium Uthikkum”. She had danced in item numbers in films, acted as a vamp, played the villain's side-kick and donned the role of the heroine's friend in a few films. After playing small roles, she made a name for herself in the industry. She acted as the heroine in a few films too.

== Film career ==
Her role in Sivaji Ganesan's Padikkadha Methai, Kai Koduttha Dheivam, Thirudan, Thavapudhalavan, Vasantha Maligai, Neethi, Bharatha Vilas, Rajaraja Cholan, Ponnunjal, Engal Thanga Raja, Thaai, Anbai Thedi, Vaira Nenjam, Gruhapravesam, Rojavin Raja, Avan Oru Sarithiram, Andaman Kadhali, Justice Gopinath, Naan Vazhavaippen and Keezh Vaanam Sivakkum was widely talked about her character.

Her notable films such as Dharisanam, En Annan, Kalyana Oorvalam, Idhaya Veenai, Kattila Thottila, Thedi Vantha Lakshmi, Thirumalai Thenkumari, Karunthel Kannayiram, Athirshtakaran, Roshakkari including films were successful. She has acted in films of great actors like and MGR.

After stopping acting in films, Sakuntala was working in the television series.

== Personal life and death ==
Sakunthala had a large family, including four brothers and two sisters.

Sakunthala died in Bengaluru, Karnataka on 17 September 2024, at the age of 84.

== Awards ==
- Kalaimamani Award - 2006

== Filmography ==
This is a partial filmography. You can expand it.

=== 1960s ===
Year	Film	Role	Notes
1960	Kaithi Kannayiram	Dancer	
1960	Padikkadha Methai	Tharani	
1961	Vijayanagarada Veeraputhra		Kannada
1963	Naan Vanangum Deivam		
1964	Kai Koduttha Dheivam	Dancer	
1965	Kuppivala		Malayalam
1965	Karthigai Deepam		
1967	Aggi Dora		Telugu
1967	Cochin Express		Malayalam
1967	Ninaivil Nindraval		
1967	Chikkadu Dorakadu		Telugu
1968	Oli Vilakku		
1969	Buddhimanthudu	Dancer	Telugu
1969	Gandikota Rahasyam	Dancer	Telugu
1969	Thirudan	Dancer	

=== 1970s ===
Year	Film	Role	Notes
1970	En Annan		
1970	CID Shankar	Vidhya	
1970	Lakshmi Kataksham		Telugu
1970	Thirumalai Thenkumari	Lalitha	
1970	Dharisanam		
1970	Kalyana Oorvalam		
1971	Justice Viswanathan		
1971	Kankaatchi		
1971	Veetukku Oru Pillai	Seetha/Reetta	
1971	Nenu Manishine		Telugu
1971	Pudhiya Vazhkai	Kalpana	
1971	Punnagai		
1972	Vasantha Maligai	Dancer	
1972	Agathiyar	Urvasi	
1972	Idhaya Veenai	Vasantha	
1972	Ashirvadham		
1972	Karunthel Kannayiram		
1972	Ganga		
1972	Neethi	Record Rani Dancer	
1972	Thavapudhalavan	Vimala	
1972	Puguntha Veedu		
1973	Deivamsam		
1973	Ponnunjal	Sundari	
1973	Suryagandhi	Usha	
1973	Rajaraja Cholan	Dancer	
1973	Amman Arul		
1973	Manjal Kungumam		
1973	Deiva Kuzhanthaigal		
1973	Petha Manam Pithu		
1973	Thedi Vantha Lakshmi		
1973	Kattila Thottila		
1973	Engal Thanga Raja	Rani	
1973	Baghdad Perazhagi		
1973	Bharatha Vilas	Kalaivani Gopal	
1973	Vaayadi		
1974	Kai Niraya Kaasu		
1974	Thaai	Gulopjon	
1974	Thai Piranthal	Lalitha	
1974	Roshakkari		
1974	Panathukkaga		
1974	Ungal Viruppam		
1974	Anbai Thedi		
1974	Thirudi		
1974	Anbu Thangai		
1974	Unnaithan Thambi		
1975	Enga Pattan Sothu		
1975	Thennangkeetru		
1975	Cinema Paithiyam		
1975	Aayirathil Oruthi		
1975	Yarukku Maappillai Yaro		
1975	Vaira Nenjam	Shoba	
1975	Sondhangal Vazhga		
1975	Neela Ponman	Urmila	Malayalam
1975	Malsaram		Malayalam
1976	Gruhapravesam		
1976	Mittai Mummy		
1976	Kalangalil Aval Vasantham	Radha	
1976	Varaprasadham		
1976	Unmaiye Un Vilai Enna?		
1976	Rojavin Raja	Nirmala	
1976	Thayilla Kuzhandhai		
1977	Sri Krishna Leela		
1977	Avan Oru Sarithiram	Dancer	
1977	Murugan Adimai		
1978	Athirshtakaran		
1978	Andaman Kadhali		
1978	Mangudi Minor	Julie	
1978	Makkal Kural		
1978	Siritanakke Savaal		Kannada
1978	Justice Gopinath	Valli	
1978	Thacholi Ambu		Malayalam
1978	Kadathanaattu Maakkam		Malayalam
1978	Kaviraja Kalamegam		
1978	Vayasu Ponnu		
1979	Nallathoru Kudumbam		
1979	Nadagame Ulagam		
1979	Naan Vazhavaippen		
1979	Mayandi		
1979	Imayam		
1979	Enippadigal		
1979	Kuppathu Raja		
1979	Aavesham		Malayalam

=== 1980s ===
Year	Film	Role	Notes
1980	Vandichakkaram	Thief	
1980	Kaksha		Telugu
1981	Keezh Vaanam Sivakkum		
1982	Patnam Vachina Pativrathalu		Telugu
1984	Nalam Nalamariya Aaval		
1985	Deivapiravi		
1986	Punnagai Mannan		
1987	Uzhavan Magan	Guna's sister	
1987	Velaikkaran		
1989	Kadhal Enum Nadhiyinile		
1989	Samsara Sangeetham		
1989	Poruthathu Pothum		

=== 1990s ===
Year	Film	Role	Notes
1991	Pudhiya Raagam		
1991	Sri Saila Bramarambika Kataksham		Telugu
1996	Vasantha Vaasal	Velu's mother-in-law	
1996	Andha Naal		
1996	Nethaji		
1998	Ponmaanai Thedi		

== Television ==
Year	Title	Channel
1999–2001	Kudumbam	Sun TV
1999–2000	Sontham	Sun TV
2000–2001	Vazhkai	Sun TV
2001–2004	Agni Saatchi	Star Vijay
2004–2005	Roja	Jaya TV
2006–2010	Kasthuri	Sun TV
2010	Poovilangu(TV Series)	Star Vijay
2014–2015	Kalyana Parisu	Sun TV
2015–2016	Sabitha Engira Sabapathi	Raj TV
2019	Tamil Selvi	Sun TV
