= Jayachitra =

Indian actress

- Born: Lakshmi Rohini Devi; 5 September 1957 (age 69); Chennai, Tamil Nadu, India
- Occupation: Actress
- Years active: 1972-present
- Spouse: Ganesh (m.1983-2020)
- Children: Amresh Ganesh (b.1988)

Jayachitra (born 5 September 1957) is an Indian actress who works mostly in Tamil, Telugu and Kannada films.

== Early life ==
Her father Mahea was a veterinary doctor, who had earlier worked as a lawyer. Her mother Ammaji (a.k.a. Jayasree) was an actress who had acted in films such as the Tamil film Mahaveeran (1955) and Telugu films Rojulu Marai and Daiva Balam (1959). They moved to Chennai for work, which was where Jayachitra was born and raised as Rohini. Her grandmother looked after her when her parents were busy with work. With her mother's encouragement, she became a child star at the age of six in the Telugu film Bhakta Potana.

== Lead actress ==
When Jayachitra was in her early teens, she screen-tested for a Telugu film titled Beedala Paatlu, but the director felt she was too young and rejected her for the role. However, he did recommend her to K.S. Gopalakrishnan, who was looking for a young, spirited heroine, for the Tamil film Korathi Magan, (1972). He immediately cast her, because he loved the way she delivered her lines. He signed her for three films under his banner and gave her the name Jayachitra. She continued in heroine roles in Ponnukku Thanga Manasu (1973) and played Sivaji's daughter in Bharata Vilas and was one of the 9 heroines in MGR's Navaratnam. She worked for big-name directors, such as K. Balachander in Sollathaan Ninaikiren and Arangetram. She was Kamal Haasan's heroine in the Tamil film Ilamai Oonjal Aadukirathu (1978) and its Telugu remake Vayasu Pilichindi (1978). As an actress, she was known for her courage and spontaneity as she continued to star in Tamil and Telugu films. She faced a snake up close in Vellikizhamai Viratham (1974), and then a tiger in the Telugu film Cheppindi Chesta (1978). She made other unforgettable films: Ponnukku Thanga Manasu, Sathyam, Kalyanamam Kalyanam, Vandikaran Magan, Cinema Paithiyam (remake of the Hindi hit film Guddi (1971)). Most of her Tamil films are with Kamal Haasan. She memorably played the title role in the Telugu film Kalpana (1977), a remake of the Hindi hit film Anamika (1973)...

== Later roles ==
Later, she became a character actress in K. Balachander's film Pudhu Pudhu Arthangal (1989). After completing 200 films, she turned to television with the serial Sumangali, which she produced, directed and acted in. It became a hit, and she was soon acting and producing other serials, Alaigal and Sivaranjini (2005). She was unanimously elected chairperson of the action committee of the TV Serial Producers' Guild of South India, which in turn led to her involvement in politics. She joined the Congress party and has remained fairly active. She has won numerous awards, including Tamil Nadu's Kalaimamani Award.

== As director ==
She cast herself as the heroine in the Tamil film Pudhiya Raagam (1991), which marked her debut as a director and producer. Unfortunately, the film flopped. In 2010, she cast her son Amresh Ganesh as the hero in the Tamil film Naane Ennul Illai (2010), which she wrote, produced, and directed.

== Personal life ==
After more than a decade as a heroine, Jayachitra decided to concentrate on her personal life by marrying an industrialist named Ganesh in 1983. She has a son with him named Amresh, whom she is trying to promote in show business, just as her mother had done with her. Despite giving him a debut through Naane Ennul Illai (2010), the film's failure made it difficult for Amresh to succeed as an actor. In 2011, it was announced that he would work on projects titled Kaliyuga Kadhalan and Machan Ava En Aalu Da, with the former being set in three different eras, but neither film was completed. Later in the year, Jayachitra announced that she was working on three more films with Amresh in the lead role, Mundru Mugangal, Nedunchalai and Scene Podathey, but again neither film materialised. In 2013, he briefly worked on the making of another incomplete film Thaaru Maaru, which had a grand launch event. In 2015, he was signed on by Raghava Lawrence to work on the music for his forthcoming film Motta Siva Ketta Shiva. Her husband Ganesh died on 3 December 2020.

== Partial filmography ==
=== Tamil films ===
Year	Movie	Role	Notes
1972	Kurathi Magan		
1972	Vazhaiyadi Vazhai		
1973	Arangetram	Mangalam	
1973	School Master		
1973	Bharatha Vilas		
1973	Ponnukku Thanga Manasu		
1973	Pennai Nambungal		
1973	Ponvandu		
1973	Sollathaan Ninaikkiren		
1973	Pookkari	Dhanam	
1974	Engamma Sapatham		
1974	Panathukkaga		
1974	Akkarai Pachai		
1974	Ungal Viruppam		
1974	Idhayam Parkirathu		
1974	Onne Onnu Kanne Kannu		
1974	Patha Poojai		
1974	Unnaithan Thambi		
1974	Kadavul Mama		
1974	Thaai Paasam		
1974	Vellikizhamai Viratham		
1974	Kalyanamam Kalyanam		
1974	Dheerga Sumangali		Special appearance
1974	Engal Kula Deivam		
1974	Kaliyuga Kannan		
1975	Pattikkaattu Raja		
1975	Pattampoochi		
1975	Cinema Paithiyam		
1975	Yarukku Maappillai Yaro		
1975	Sonthangal Vazhga		
1975	Pinju Manam		
1975	Then Sindhudhe Vaanam		
1976	Inspector Manaivi		
1976	Panakkara Penn		
1976	Dasavatharam		
1976	Thottathellam Pon Aagum		
1976	Asai 60 Naal		
1976	Payanam		
1976	Thayilla Kuzhandai		
1976	Satyam		
1976	Kumara Vijayam		
1976	Varaprasadham		
1976	Nee Indri Naan Illai		
1977	Aalukkoru Aasai		
1977	Navarathinam		
1978	Ilamai Oonjal Aadukirathu		
1978	Sadhurangam		
1978	Vanakkatukuriya Kathaliye		
1978	Sakka Podu Podu Raja		
1978	Vandikkaran Magan		
1978	Pilot Premnath		
1978	Varuvan Vadivelan		
1979	Mayandi		
1979	Gnana Kuzhandhai		
1980	Pennukku Yaaru Kaaval		Remake of Chillarakottu Chittemma
1980	Ratha Paasam		
1981	Sorgathin Thirappu Vizha		
1981	Srinivasa Kalyanam		
1982	Nandri, Meendum Varuga		Cameo appearance
1982	Mamiyara Marumagala		
1982	Nayakarin Magal		100th film
1983	Kaman Pandigai		
1985	Thandanai		
1985	Engal Kural		
1985	Yaar?		
1986	Lakshmi Vanthachu		
1987	Paruva Ragam		
1987	Ivargal Varungala Thoongal		
1988	Agni Nakshatram		
1989	Pudhu Pudhu Arthangal		
1991	Pudhiya Raagam		Also director, producer and writer
1995	Maaman Magal		
1996	Selva		
1997	Raasi		
1997	Kaadhali		
1997	Vasuki		
2008	Nadigai	Herself	uncredited
2010	Rettaisuzhi		
2010	Naane Ennul Illai		
2019	100% Kadhal		
2022	Ponniyin Selvan: I	Sembiyan Madevi	
2023	Ponniyin Selvan: II	Sembiyan Madevi	

=== Telugu films ===
- Soggadu (1975)
- Bharatamlo Oka Ammayi (1975)
- Yavvanam Katesindi (1976)
- Maa Daivam (1976)
- Chillarakottu Chittemma (1977)
- Savasagaallu (1977)
- Tholireyi Gadichindi (1977)
- Aatmiyudu (1977)
- Kalpana (1977)
- Manchi Babayi (1978)
- Nindu Manishi (1978)
- Cheppindi Chestha (1978)
- Love Marriage (1978) as Sujatha
- Katakataala Rudraiah (1978)
- Mugguru Muggure (1978) as Geetha
- Vayasu Pilichindi (1978)
- Annadammula Savaal (1978)
- Rickshaw Raji (1978)
- Muttaiduva (1979)
- Allari Vayasu (1979)
- Tirupati Shri Venkateswara Kalyanam (1979)
- Allari Pillalu (1979)
- Ravanude Ramudayithe? (1979)
- Kaksha (1980)
- Naa Mogudu Brhmachari (1981)
- Bobbili Puli (1982)
- Ee Prasnaku Baduledi (1986)
- Kashmora (1986) as Sidhaswari Devi
- Muvva Gopaludu (1987)
- Mama Alludu (1990)
- Abbaigaru (1993)
- Rajeswari Kalyanam (1993)
- Hello Alludu (1994) as Sumithra Devi
- Gharana Bullodu (1995)
- Attaa ... Nee Koduku Jaagratta (1997)
- Love Story 1999 (1998)
- Samarasimha Reddy (1999)
- Kondaveeti Simhasanam (2002)
- Adrustam (2002)
- Narasimhudu (2005)
- Prema Lokam (2005)
- Kashmora (2005)
- Bhagavanth Kesari (2023)

=== Malayalam films ===
- Nee Ente Lahari (1976)
- Pappu (1980)

=== Kannada films ===
- Mannina Maga (1968)
- Huliya Haalina Mevu (1979) as Thanga
- Kulla Kulli (1980) as Kulli / Chitra
- Mane Mane Kathe (1981) as Geetha
- Aparanji (1984)
- Sathva Pareekshe (1987)
- Premaloka (1987)
- Ranadheera (1988)
- Lockup Death (1994)
- Vijayadashami (2003) as Mahalakshmi
- Attahasa (2013) as Jayalalithaa

== Television ==
- Alaigal (Sun TV) as Savithri
- Sivaranjani
- Ranga Vilas (Jaya TV)
- Mr & Mrs Gundanna (Udaya TV)

== Awards ==
- She won Nandi Award for Best Supporting Actress – Rajeswari Kalyanam (1992)
