= Paritchaikku Neramaachu =

- Theatrical release poster
- Directed by: Muktha Srinivasan
- Screenplay by: Vietnam Veedu Sundaram
- Based on: Paritchaikku Neramaachu by Y. G. Mahendran
- Produced by: Muktha Ramaswamy
- Starring: Sivaji Ganesan; Sujatha; Thengai Srinivasan; Y. G. Mahendran
- Cinematography: M. Karnan
- Edited by: V. P. Krishnan; C. R. Shanmugam
- Music by: M. S. Viswanathan
- Production company: Vidhya Movies
- Release date: 14 November 1982
- Country: India
- Language: Tamil

Paritchaikku Neramaachu (transl. Time for the exam) is a 1982 Indian Tamil-language drama film, directed by Muktha Srinivasan and produced by Muktha Ramaswamy. The film stars Sivaji Ganesan, Sujatha, Thengai Srinivasan and Y. G. Mahendran. It is based on Mahendran's play of the same name. The film was released on 14 November 1982.

== Plot ==
Narashimaachari is an honest government servant who is highly respected for his virtues and discipline. He has a dimwit son, Varadhukutty who is considered an idiot on account of his inability to get a job after passing his SSLC. Narashimaachari constantly requests his manager to somehow get his son a government job. The manager says that if Varadukkutty can clear the Public Service Commission exams, he will get a job in the same office as his father. After questioning Varadhukutty, the manager says that Varadukkutty can't clear the exam and sarcastically says that maybe he can pass only if the question paper is leaked.

Narashimaachari has rented out a part of his house to Ragothama Rao's family, where Varathikutty falls in love with Rao's daughter, Jayanthi. She too reciprocates due to the innocence and good-heartedness of Varadhukutty. Narashimaachari goes to the extent of buying the leaked question papers from his corrupt office colleague, Anantharaman ahead of time, leaving his principles and self-respect in an attempt to get his son through but Narashimaachari gets caught redhanded before the manager and his office colleagues. He takes a six-month leave from work, vowing to make his son a top student through his efforts and prepare him for the exam somehow honestly. He and Jayanthi work together to make Varadhu study for the exam and succeed in the endeavour. While leaving for the examination hall, he dies in a sudden, high-speed run car accident. The car driver could not be identified as there was no number plate on the car, but the bystanders around identify the one sitting next to the car driver was wearing a white scarf with a blue cross on it. Narashimaachari was looking and waiting to kill the person who killed his son by car. His wife, Vedha becomes mentally ill due to it.

One year later, Anand, a look-alike of Varadhukutty and a thief cum rowdy is chased by a group of people who coincidentally hide in the house of Narashimaachari. His wife Vedha, immediately recognises Anand as her son, and hence, Narashimaachari requests him to play as his son to cure his wife. Anand reluctantly agrees as he is temporarily on the run from the police. The love from Narashimaachari eventually makes Anand turn into a good guy and also quit drinking and smoking.

A few days later, Anand's friend Samuel visits him to inform him about the new theft. But, Anand rejects and tells Samuel that he is now a new person and not involved in any such activities. In a conversation with Ragothama Rao and Samuel, Anand realises that it was he who ran the car over Varadhukutty, which is overheard by Vedha. Vedha reveals that she already knew that Anand was not her son. Anand now feeling guilty, says that he would tell the truth to Narashimaachari and accept whatever punishment given by him. Narashimaachari is not able to harm Anand, as his face reminds him of Varadhukutty. Both, Narashimaachari and Vedha adopt as well as accept Anand as their son. Anand wants to fulfill his father's dream of clearing the exam and getting a job. While leaving for the examination hall, in a twist of fate, Anand dies in an overcrowded bus accident, leaving Narashimaachari and Vedha devastated.

== Cast ==
- Sivaji Ganesan as Narashimaachari
- Sujatha as Vedha, Narashimaachari's wife
- Y. G. Mahendran as Varadhukutty and Anand
- Vennira Aadai Moorthy as Ragothama Rao
- Thengai Srinivasan as Anantharaman
- V. Gopalakrishnan as Manager Mahadevan
- Radha Ravi as Samuel, Anand's friend
- Delhi Ganesh as Psychiatrist
- Neelu as Bhagavathar
- Kathadi Ramamurthy as Anandharaman's brother-in-law
- Usilai Mani as Hotel Owner from Trichy
- Oru Viral Krishna Rao as Hotel Owner's Assistant
- Typist Gopu as Anantharaman's father-in-law
- Loose Mohan as a person in the temple
- Manorama as Subathra, Ragothama Rao's wife
- Poornima Jayaram as Jayanthi, Ragothama Rao's daughter
- Silk Smitha as Suseela, Dancer
- S. N. Parvathy
- Y. G. Parthasarathy
- G. Srinivasan
- Vietnam Veedu Sundaram as a person in Beach (Cameo appearance)

== Production ==
Y. G. Mahendran wrote and staged the play Paritchaikku Neramaachu in 1978. After watching the play, Muktha Srinivasan expressed interest in a film adaptation which he eventually directed. In order to portray the Iyengar character Narasimhachari accurately, Sivaji Ganesan observed the demeanours of real Iyengar people at the Parthasarathy Temple in Triplicane. At other times, he would help Mahendran with his acting.

== Soundtrack ==
The music was composed by M. S. Viswanathan, with lyrics by Vaali.

Track listing
No.	Title	Singer(s)	Length
1.	"Malikai Poocharam Manjalin Mohanam"	P. Susheela, Vani Jairam
2.	"Oru Oosaiyindri Mounammaga"	P. Jayachandran
3.	"Ragam Talam Pallavi Endru Geetham"	T. M. Soundararajan
4.	"Naa Aatthu Paakam Kulikka Pona"	L. R. Eswari

== Release and reception ==
Paritchaikku Neramaachu was released on 14 November 1982 Diwali day alongside other releases such as Darling, Darling, Darling, Valibamey Vaa Vaa, Agni Sakshi, Kanmani Poonga and Adhisayappiravigal. Thiraignani of Kalki appreciated the acting of actors and Sundaram's dialogues and concluded saying people like Muktha Srinivasan who secure lot of marks can arrive few hours late but audience should leave in time. Balumani of Anna praised the acting of cast, Viswanathan's music, Srinivasan's direction for moving the film without any lag and found both the dialogues and the film to be just okay.

== Dropped remake ==
In 2012, Mahendran confirmed that a remake of Paritchaikku Neramaachu starring Santhanam was in development. The project was later dropped.
