= Iru Medhaigal =

- Poster
- Directed by: Muktha Srinivasan
- Screenplay by: Muktha Srinivasan
- Story by: Thooyavan
- Produced by: Muktha Ramaswamy
- Starring: Sivaji Ganesan; Saritha; Prabhu; Radha
- Cinematography: M. Karnan
- Edited by: V. P. Krishnan; C. R. Shanmugam
- Music by: M. S. Viswanathan
- Production company: Muktha Movies
- Release date: 14 September 1984
- Country: India
- Language: Tamil

Iru Medhaigal (transl. Two Geniuses) is a 1984 Indian Tamil-language comedy thriller film directed by Muktha Srinivasan and produced by his elder brother Muktha Ramaswamy. The film stars Sivaji Ganesan, Saritha, Prabhu and Radha. It was released on 14 September 1984, and failed at the box office.

== Plot ==
Balaram kidnaps the children of rich but dishonorable people and ransoms them. Ranga is a car thief. The two men meet when Balaram mistakenly kidnaps Ranga assuming he is Rajalingam's nephew, Mahesh. The confusion is cleared up and they realise that they both are searching for the same person, Devaki. She is Ranga's long-lost older sister and she's also Balaram's ex-girlfriend. The two decide to continue working together while they search and kidnap Radha. She is the heiress to a great fortune left to her by her older brother Chandrasekar. Rajalingam is the manager of Radha's companies and refuses to hand over the ransom. Radha is convinced her guardian would give any ransom to see her safe. She works with the two men to get to the bottom of the mystery. Balaram and Ranga enter Radha's house under false pretenses and discover that Radha's guardian is Devaki. They also learn that Rajalingam seems to have an odd hold over her. The two must work to understand the circumstances that led Devaki to this situation and deal with Rajalingam.

== Cast ==
- Sivaji Ganesan as Balaram
- Saritha as Devaki
- Prabhu as Ranga
- Radha as Radha
- Silk Smitha as Kavitha
- Manorama
- M. N. Nambiar as Rajalingam
- Jaishankar as Chandrasekar (guest appearance)
- Major Sundarrajan (guest appearance)
- Janagaraj as Mahesh
- Radha Ravi as Ravi
- Vennira Aadai Moorthy as Gurumoorthy
- V. Gopalakrishnan
- Kathadi Ramamurthy
- Typist Gopu
- LIC Narasimhan

== Production ==
Some filming, including a romantic duet picturised on Prabhu and Radha, took place in Ooty. The song "Ammuti Kitaru" was shot at Vauhini Studios.

== Soundtrack ==
Soundtrack was composed by M. S. Viswanathan Lyrics by Vaali.

Track listing
No.	Title	Singer(s)	Length
1.	"Nee Oru Kaditham"	S. P. Balasubrahmanyam, P. Susheela
2.	"Adiye"	Malaysia Vasudevan
3.	"Ennudaya"	Vani Jairam
4.	"Ammuti Kitaru"	B. S. Sasirekha
