= Oru Malarin Payanam =

- Title card
- Directed by: Muktha Srinivasan
- Written by: Vietnam Veedu Sundaram (dialogues)
- Screenplay by: Muktha Srinivasan
- Story by: Anuradha Ramanan
- Produced by: Muktha Ramaswamy
- Starring: Lakshmi; Murali; Urvashi; Sulakshana
- Cinematography: Gajendramani
- Edited by: V. P. Krishnan; C. R. Shanmugam
- Music by: Chandrabose
- Production company: Muktha Films
- Release date: 7 June 1985
- Running time: 139 minutes
- Country: India
- Language: Tamil

Oru Malarin Payanam (transl. The journey of a flower) is a 1985 Indian Tamil-language film, directed by Muktha Srinivasan. The film stars Lakshmi, Murali, Urvashi and Sulakshana. It is based on the novel of the same name by Anuradha Ramanan. The film was released on 7 June 1985.

== Plot ==
The plot centers on a family drama involving class division, familial attachment, and the pressure of marriage.

The story follows the deep bond between two sisters, Nandhini and Sudha, which is tested when a status-conscious man named Murthy rejects an arranged marriage proposal with Sudha due to the class divide between their families.

== Cast ==
- Lakshmi
- Murali
- Urvashi
- Sulakshana
- Moulee
- Manorama
- Arundathi
- A. Sakuntala
- Vijaya Chandrika
- Janagaraj
- Idichapuli Selvaraj
- Usilaimani
- Veeraraghavan
- Kathadi Ramamurthy
- Oru Viral Krishna Rao
- Ramji
- G.K
- Nagaraja Cholan
- Vairam Krishnamoorthy
- A. Soorya Kala
- R. Jaya Chandira
- M. R. Sulochana
- Devi Chandira

== Soundtrack ==
The soundtrack was composed by Chandrabose.

Track listing
No.	Title	Singer(s)	Length
1.	"Thedum En"	T. L. Thiagarajan, Vani Jairam	4:32
2.	"Pillai Manam"	Raj Sitharaman, Vani Jairam	4:36
3.	"Thandana"	Vani Jairam	4:21
4.	"Neeya Ennai"	Vani Jairam	4:20
Total length:			17:49

== Reception ==
Jayamanmadhan of Kalki praised the performances of Lakshmi, Sulakshana and Chandrabose's music but felt Sundaram's dialogues could have been tighter.
