= Polladhavan =

Polladhavan may refer to:

- Polladhavan (1980 film), Tamil film directed by V. Srinivasan
- Polladhavan (2007 film), Tamil film directed by Vetrimaran
