= Kathanayagan (1988 film) =

- Poster
- Directed by: Muktha Srinivasan
- Screenplay by: Srinivasan; Crazy Mohan (unc.)
- Story by: Siddique–Lal
- Produced by: Muktha Ramaswamy
- Starring: Pandiarajan; S. V. Sekhar; Rekha
- Cinematography: Muktha S. Sundar
- Edited by: V. P. Krishnan
- Music by: Chandra Bose
- Production company: Mukthaa Films
- Release date: 20 May 1988
- Country: India
- Language: Tamil

Kathanayagan (transl. Hero of the story) is a 1988 Indian Tamil-language comedy film directed by Muktha Srinivasan and produced by the director's elder brother Muktha Ramaswamy, Ramaswamy Govind and Muktha S. Ravi. The film stars Pandiarajan, S. V. Sekhar, Rekha and Manorama. It is a remake of the 1987 Malayalam film Nadodikkattu. The film was released on 20 May 1988 and was a success.

== Plot ==
Friends Mani and Ramani are B.Com and SSLC graduates respectively. They have difficulties finding jobs suited to their qualification. Even if they find jobs, they are unable to sustain in the jobs for long due to their attitude. Due to their innocence, Mani and Ramani are often fooled by people. One man sells them a cow saying it will give them many litres of milk per day, but the cow ends up hardly giving them any milk. After such failed endeavours, they meet an agent, who promises them to take them to Dubai and give them a job there. They give all their money to the agent, and he tells them to get on a boat. But they are fooled because the boat goes to Kerala instead. In Kerala, a drug smuggling gang mistakes them for CID officers due to some hilarious misconceptions and funny incidents. How Mani and Ramani survive in Kerala, and at the same time, how they unintentionally cause the smuggling gang to get caught by the police, forms the rest of the story.

== Cast ==
- Pandiarajan as Mani
- S. V. Sekhar as Ramani
- Rekha as Radha
- Ramya Krishnan in a Guest Appearance
- Manorama as Radha's mother
- Kamala Kamesh as Mani's mother
- S. S. Chandran as Kannayiram
- Malaysia Vasudevan as Mamandur Maasilamani
- Delhi Ganesh as Inspector of police
- K. Natraj
- Kumarimuthu as Annan Krishnan
- Kallapetti Singaram as Konar
- Kathadi Ramamurthy as Bank officer
- Typist Gopu
- Neelu as Head clark
- Oru Viral Krishna Rao as cow buyer
- Pradeep Shakthi as Mayil Ravanan
- Bayilvan Ranganathan as Mamandur Maasilamani's henchman
- Nagarajachozhan
- Kovai Anuradha
- Pasi Narayanan as Gaja

== Soundtrack ==
The soundtrack consist of four songs composed by Chandrabose, with lyrics written by Vairamuthu. The song "Vaisakha Sandhye" from Nadodikattu was retained in Tamil as "Poo Poothathu".

Song	Singers	Length
"Ada Avatharam Eduthu Vanthal"	Malaysia Vasudevan	04:19
"Naanthanda Hanuman Payran"	Malaysia Vasudevan, Kovai Murali and chorus	03:53
"Poo Poothathai Yar Pathathu"	K. J. Yesudas	04:25
"Poo Poothathai Yar Pathathu"	Kovai Murali	04:24

== Reception ==
The Indian Express wrote, "The comedy line sometimes falters as it does when [Pandiarajan] keeps harping to the point of nausea on his educational attainment and his friend's lack of it".
