= Andharangam =

1975 film

- Poster
- Directed by: Muktha Srinivasan
- Story by: A. S. Pragasam
- Produced by: M. Venugopal
- Starring: Kamal Haasan; Deepa; Major Sundarrajan; Savitri
- Cinematography: R. Sampath
- Edited by: L. Balu
- Music by: G. Devarajan
- Production company: Maya Arts
- Release date: 12 December 1975
- Running time: 149 minutes
- Country: India
- Language: Tamil

Andharangam (transl. Privacy) is a 1975 Indian Tamil-language romantic drama film directed by Muktha Srinivasan. The film stars Kamal Haasan, Deepa, Major Sundarrajan and Savitri. It was taken primarily in black and white, but some scenes were taken in Eastmancolor. The film was not a success. It was dubbed into Telugu-language as Andhala Raja and released on 29 October 1977.

== Cast ==
- Kamal Haasan as Kaanthan
- Major Sundarrajan as Thangadurai
- Savitri as Malliga
- Deepa as Deepa
- Thengai Srinivasan as "Coimbatore" Godhandam
- Cho Ramaswamy as "Thanjavur" Dhandapani
- Manorama as Chellamma
- V. Gopalakrishnan
- Kathadi Ramamurthy
- LIC Narasimhan as Liquor seller
- K. K. Sounder as Police constable
- Sukumari as "Madurai" Maragatham
- Kumari Padmini as Kanaka
- Tambaram Lalitha

== Production ==
Andharangam was directed by Muktha Srinivasan, written by A. S. Pragasam. It was Deepa a.k.a. Unni Mary's acting debut in Tamil cinema. The film was taken primarily in black and white, but approximately 312.42 metres (1,025.0 ft) was taken in Eastmancolor. The final length of the film's prints were 3,909.06 metres (12,825.0 ft) long. Some scenes were shot at Modern Theatres, Salem.

== Soundtrack ==
The music was composed by G. Devarajan. The song "Gnaayiru Oli Mazhaiyil" marked Kamal Haasan's debut as a singer.

Track listing
No.	Title	Lyrics	Singer(s)	Length
1.	"Kuthirai Kutti"	Kannadasan	K. J. Yesudas
2.	"Gnaayiru Oli Mazhaiyil"	Nethaji	Kamal Haasan
3.	"Puthu Mugame"	Kannadasan	K. J. Yesudas, P. Susheela
4.	"Paadaganai Thedikondu"	Vaali	P. Madhuri

== Reception ==
Andharangam was released on 12 December 1975. Kanthan of Kalki said there was no redeemable aspect of the film.
