= Ninaivil Nindraval =

Ninaivil Nindraval may refer to:

- Ninaivil Nindraval (1967 film), the 1967 film
- Ninaivil Nindraval (2014 film), the 2014 film
