= Avan Aval Adhu =

1980 film by Muktha Srinivasan

- Theatrical release poster
- Directed by: Muktha Srinivasan
- Screenplay by: Visu
- Based on: Oru Singam Muyalaagirathu by Sivasankari
- Produced by: S. Sundar
- Starring: Sivakumar; Lakshmi; Sripriya
- Cinematography: R. Sampath
- Edited by: V. P. Krishnan; R. Shanmugam
- Music by: M. S. Viswanathan
- Production company: Maya Arts
- Release date: 11 April 1980
- Running time: 139 minutes
- Country: India
- Language: Tamil

Avan Aval Adhu (transl. He, she and that) is a 1980 Indian Tamil-language film directed by Muktha Srinivasan and written by Visu. The film stars Sivakumar, Lakshmi, Sripriya and Thengai Srinivasan. Dealing with the then-groundbreaking issue of surrogate pregnancy in India, it is based on the story Oru Singam Muyalaagirathu (transl. A lion becomes a rabbit) by Sivasankari. The film was released on 11 April 1980.

== Plot ==
Ramu and Lavanya are a childless couple. Lavanya is forced to have her ovaries removed because of a complication and is unable to conceive. She hires Menaka as a surrogate mother who is impregnated by Ramu through artificial insemination, without knowing who the father is.

Lavanya houses Menaka in a secluded home in an attempt to keep her pregnancy a secret and preventing Ramu and Menaka knowing each other. But Menaka and Ramu meet coincidentally, and fall in love with each other. Ramu starts to cheat on Lavanya. Lavanya learns about the affair and leaves the house. Menaka realizes her mistake and ends the affair after delivering the baby. Lavanya forgives Ramu and rejoins him and the newborn.

== Cast ==
- Sivakumar as Ramu
- Lakshmi as Lavanya
- Sripriya as Menaka
- Thengai Srinivasan
- Manorama as Muniyamma
- Y. G. Mahendran
- Kathadi Ramamurthy
- Typist Gopu
- Gundu Kalyanam

== Soundtrack ==
The music was composed by M. S. Viswanathan. Lyrics written by Kannadasan.

Song	Singers
"Andha Naal Mudharkkondu"	L. R. Eswari, Manorama
"Illam Sangeetham Athil"	S. P. Balasubrahmanyam, Vani Jairam
"Kasturi Thilakam La Laala Palake"	Vani Jairam
"Margazhi Pookkale Ilam Thendrale"	T. L. Maharajan, Vani Jairam

== Reception ==
Despite being significantly different from the source material, the film was well received critically and commercially. Kanthan of Kalki praised the film for the morals it was propagating.
