= Muktha Srinivasan =

Indian film director, producer (1929–2018)

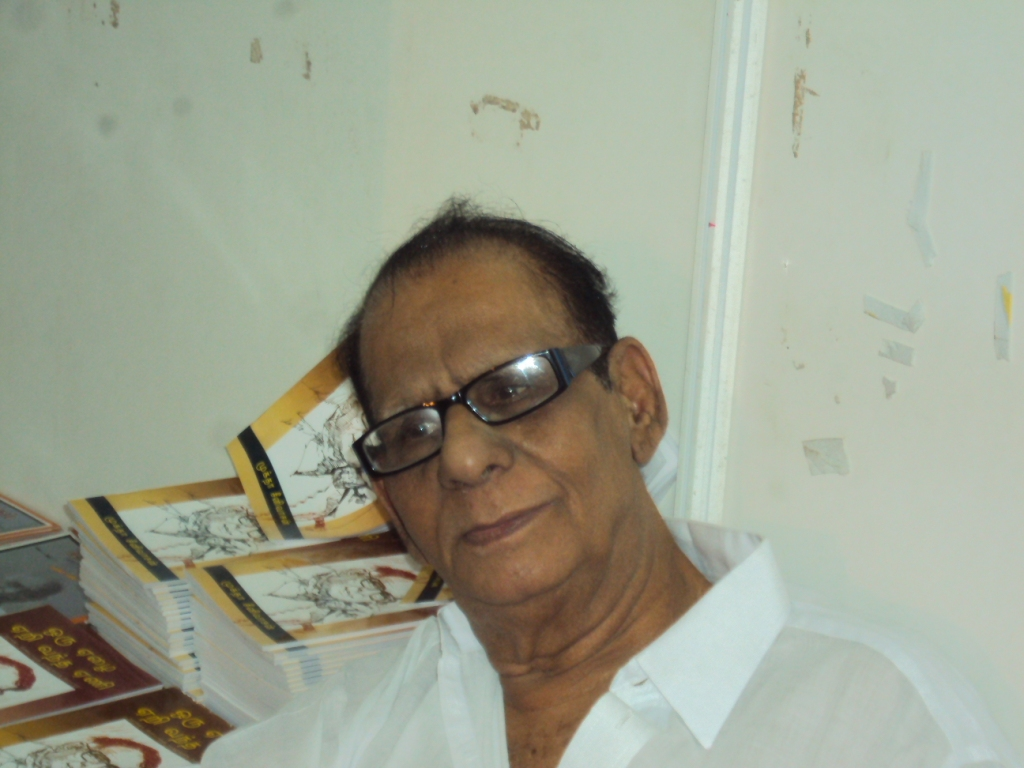
- Born: Venkatachary Srinivasan; 31 October 1929; Malapuram, Tamil Nadu, British Raj
- Died: 29 May 2018 (aged 88)
- Occupations: Film director; producer
- Children: Muktha S. Sundar

Muktha Srinivasan (1929 – 2018) was an Indian film director and producer.

== Personal life ==
V. Srinivasan was born in Malapuram on 31 October 1929 in a Tamil Brahmin family. His parents were Venkatachariar and Chellamma. His elder brother is Muktha Ramaswamy and his sister is Revathi. He married Prema in 1951. He has three children Muktha S. Sundar, also a director, Mukhta Ravi and Maya. Muktha Srinivasan is the founder of Muktha Films. His elder grandson Suseendran who acted in movies like Kashmora and Echarikkai is now the managing director of Muktha Films.

== Death ==
He died on 29 May 2018 at the age of 88 in his residence in T.Nagar, Chennai due to old age after suffering from various health issues.

== Career ==
V. Srinivasan alias Muktha Srinivasan entered the film industry in 1947, as Senior Assistant to T. R. Sundaram, by coaching artists in dialogue delivery. As a technical helper he has worked with the then future chief ministers of Tamil Nadu M. Karunanidhi and M. G. Ramachandran in Manthiri Kumari and with major artists of the time including T. R. Mahalingam, Anjali Devi, Madhuri Devi, S. Balachander and L. V. Prasad. He worked with Director K. Ramnoth as assistant along with K. S. Sethumadhavan. He also worked as assistant director to D. Yoganand in the film Madurai Veeran of M. G. Ramachandran.

Muktha Srinivasan directed his first film, Mudhalali, in 1957 which was produced by Ratna Studios. Production was four months and three days in a period when films usually took more than a year to be completed. The film was a success, despite its having had a relatively unknown cast. It won a National Award presented by Dr. Rajendra Prasad, then President of India, in the presence of Pandit Jawaharlal Nehru. Srinivasan started producing films with his elder brother Muktha V. Ramaswamy under the name Muktha Films in 1961. He always preferred to have music by either the duo Vishwanatha-Ramamoorthy or by M.S.Viswanathan.

His first choice for hero in the sixties, was always Gemini Ganesan and directed Gemini in Panithirai, Idhayathil Nee, Poojaikku Vandha Malar and Thenmazhai. The 4 comedy films directed by him – Thenmazhai, Ninaivil Nindraval, Bommalattam and Ayiram Poi are recognised as landmark films in Tamil Cinema. He directed the pair Gemini and Savithri along with Sandhya in Poojaikki Vandha Malar which was box office success. He directed actress Sandhya's daughter J. Jayalalithaa in three landmark films – Bomalattam, Suryagandhi, Anbai Thedi and made her do guest appearance in Cinema Paithiyam. The film Suryagandhi is considered by him as the best of all the films he directed. Suryagandhi was digitalized and re-released in September 2016. He successfully brought in together Nagesh and Cho for 3 films Thenmazhai, Bomalattam and Ninaivil Nindraval.

He introduced Vaali as lyricist, actresses Devika, Deepa and others to the silver screen. He brought to light Actor-Director T. S. B. K. Mouli's acting prowess in his film Suryagandhi. Visu the dramatist became Visu the filmmaker after working in his Keezh Vaanam Sivakkum. He has received numerous awards and as of 2018 he was the most senior director alive and active producer in the Tamil film industry.

He directed Sivaji Ganesan in Nirai Kudam, Arunodhayam, Thavapudhalavan, Anbai Thedi, Andaman Kadhali, Imayam, Keezh Vaanam Sivakkum and Iru Medhaigal. He directed Sivaji Ganesan in 9 films. He directed Kamal Haasan in Andharangam and Simla Special and directed Rajnikanth in Polladhavan. He directed actors across generations – Ravichandran, Jaishankar, Muthuraman, Sivakumar, S. V. Sekhar, Pandiaraj. Out of his 45 directorial ventures, 23 were box office hits. In his films, Cho Ramaswamy, Neelu and Manorama were cast regularly throughout his career. He produced Nayakan in 1987. He produced 27 films and 19 of them were commercial success. His last and the 28th production was Vedantha Desigar made in 2018, which was not released till the time of his death and was released in Sankara TV in 2022.

The film Andha Naal, in which he assisted S. Balachander, was the first film without songs that was made in Madras and it was his first film where he started his career as an assistant director. This became a hit.

Mukta has produced several films most popular one being Nayagan where the former had a fallout with Kamal Hassan, the writer and the lead actor.

Srinivasan was one of the founders of, and served as President for, the Tamil Film Producer Council. He served as President of the South Indian film chamber of commerce. He was Chairman of Film City, owned by the state government of Tamil Nadu. He was also Member of Award Films Committees and a Board Member of the Film Censor Board.

== Filmography ==
Year	Film	Credited as			Notes
Year	Film	Director	Producer	Screenplay	Notes
1957	Allavudheenum Arputha Vilakkum			✓	
1957	Mudhalali	✓			
1959	Thamarai Kulam	✓			
1959	Naalu Veli Nilam	✓			
1959	Odi Vilaiyaadu Paapa	✓			
1959	Panchaali	✓			
1961	Panithirai	✓	✓		
1963	Idhayathil Nee	✓	✓		
1965	Poojaikku Vandha Malar	✓			
1965	Magane Kel	✓			
1966	Thenmazhai	✓			
1967	Ninaivil Nindraval	✓			
1968	Bommalattam	✓			
1969	Aayiram Poi	✓			
1969	Nirai Kudam	✓	✓		
1971	Arunodhayam	✓	✓		
1972	Thava Pudhalvan	✓	✓		
1973	SuryaGandhi	✓			
1974	Anbai Thedi	✓	✓		
1975	Cinema Paithiyam	✓			
1975	Andharangam	✓			
1976	Perum Pugazhum	✓			
1977	Balaparitchai	✓			
1978	Andaman Kadhali	✓	✓		
1979	Imayam	✓	✓		
1979	Sri Ramajayam	✓			
1980	Avan Aval Adhu	✓	✓		25th Film
1980	Polladhavan	✓	✓		
1981	Keezh Vaanam Sivakkum	✓	✓		
1982	Simla Special	✓	✓		
1982	Paritchaikku Neramaachu	✓	✓		
1983	Sivappu Sooriyan	✓	✓		
1983	Thambathigal	✓			
1984	Iru Medhaigal	✓	✓	✓	
1985	Oru Malarin Payanam	✓	✓	✓	
1986	Kodai Mazhai		✓		
1987	Nayakan		✓		
1988	Kathanayagan	✓	✓		
1989	Vaai Kozhuppu	✓	✓	✓	
1989	Chinna Chinna Aasaigal		✓		
1990	Ethir Kaatru		✓	✓	
1992	Brahmachari	✓	✓	✓	
1994	Rajapandi		✓		
1998	Kangalin Vaarthaigal		✓		
2013	Pathayeram Kodi		✓		
2015	Sivappu		✓		50th Film (Producer)
2018	Vedanta Desika	✓			Sanskrit film

== Awards ==
- Recipient of National Award for the film Mudalali
- Best film 1977–78 Balaparitchai by Tamil Nadu state government
- Best Science Fiction film Avan-Aval-Adhu State Award
- Best film 1981–82 keezh vanam sivakkum State Award
- 1982-83 Paritchaikku Neramaachu – Tamil Nadu State Film Award for Best Director

== Politics ==
Srinivasan was attracted to politics from the age of seven when he carried the flag of the Symbol of Congress and went to various places around his village. This was the first instance of him canvassing for Congress and his relatives asked him to concentrate on studies and stopped him from canvassing due to the age factor.

After completing school he met Somu Rao who influenced him to follow the Communist ideology. He became close friends with Manali Kandasamy, Amirthalingam, Bala Dandayutham, and P. Ramamoorthy, which finally led him to meet Comrade Jeevanandham. They became close friends and together organised meetings in Tamil Nadu. It was at this time that the communist party was banned. Srinivasan, who at that time had been working in a government office at Selam in 1946, lost his job and was arrested. His brother Muktha Ramasamy, who was working with modern theatre, approached his boss and sought his help to release Srinivasan from jail. His films such as Mudalali, Naalu Veli Nilam & Thamarai kulam were influenced by the Communist ideology. When disputes started arising in the Communist Party he lost his interest. At this stage Srinivasan was an avid reader becoming inspired by Gandhian principles and he joined Congress in 1961. While working with Sivaji Ganesan he started organizing meetings. He canvassed for the 1962 elections and gave speeches supporting Congress under the leadership of K. Kamaraj.

He used to follow "Mouna-Viradham". He would not speak and would have only water on holy days. In his early days he used to spin his own clothes with a Raatai chakkaram (Hand machine).

When G.K. Moopanar started the Tamil Maanila Congress in 1996 he appointed Srinivasan as General Secretary.

Srinivasan has held the positions of District Congress president, Vice-President Tamil Nadu Congress Committee (TNCC) and Gen-secretary Tamil Maanila Congress (Gk moopanar).

== Bibliography ==
- Irupadam Noorrandin Kathaigal Part I -V
- Thejasvi
- Thalaimurai Kathaigal
- Uthami
- Thandanikku Thappiya Kutrangal
- Manu
- Mukthavin Sirukathaigal
- Athma Vendradhu
- Sollatha Rakasiyam
- Thirumanam Punidhamanathu
- Mana Santhippu
- Manushya Dharmam
- Koothukaran Thopu
- Mukthavin Katturaigal
- Manitha Neya Kathaigal
- Edhir Veettu Hema
- Kaala Vellam
- Parampariyam
- Ulagathin Sirantha Kadaigal Part – I & II
- Ilakkiyathil Inaiyum India
- Tamil Thiraippada Varalaru
- Tamil Thiraippada Thayarippalargalin Varalaru
- Kalainjargalodu Nan
- Kathasiriyargalodu Nan
- Arinjarkalodu Nan
- Ninaivu Edugal
- Kopamum Sirippum
- Samooga Nidhi Porattangal
- Manudam Kanda Maga Gyanigal
- Inaiyatra Sadanaiyalargal Part I – V
- Noolgal Tharum Nunnarivu Part I & II
- Ramayanathil Thunai Kadha pathirangal
- Manavarkalukana India Suthanthira Porattam – Tamil
- Manavarkalukana India Suthanthira Porattam – English
- Barathiyin Gyana Semmal
- Tamil Thayaripalargal Varalaru Part I & II
- Film Chamber Varalaru – in Tamil and in English
- Kalidasanin Megadhoodam
- Vada Mozhi Ilakkiyam
- Nan Santhitha Kalaijargal
- Raghu Vamasa Maha Kaviyam
- Innum Sila Kadaigal
