= Perazhagi ISO =

2019 Indian drama film by C. Vijayan

- Directed by: C. Vijayan
- Starring: Shilpa Manjunath; Vivek Raj; Sachu
- Cinematography: E. J. Nauzad; Sabarish Jayakumar
- Edited by: Ilavarasan
- Music by: Charles Dhana
- Production company: Creamines Movie Makers
- Release date: 24 May 2019
- Country: India
- Language: Tamil

Perazhagi ISO (transl. Beautiful girl ISO) is a 2019 Indian Tamil-language science fiction film directed by C. Vijayan. It stars Shilpa Manjunath and Sachu in the lead roles, alongside a cast featuring predominantly newcomers. The film narrates the tale of a 60-year-old woman who turns into a 20-year-old after she accidentally falls into the hands of a business organisation researching on the process of age reversing. Featuring music composed by Charles Dhana, the film was released on 26 May 2019.

== Cast ==
- Shilpa Manjunath as Keerthana / Meghna
- Sachu as Mohanambal
- Vivek Raj
- Saravana Subbiah
- Livingston as Veerasamy
- Delhi Ganesh
- R. Sundarrajan

== Production ==
The film was made by director C. Vijayan, who cast actresses Sachu and Shilpa Manjunath in the leading roles. Vivek Raj, who had earlier appeared in Nee Enna Maayam Seidhai (2017), was selected in a leading role, while actors Livingston and Saravana Subbiah were also included in the film. The film's shoot progressed throughout 2018, and post-production was completed in early 2019.

== Soundtrack ==
The film's soundtrack was composed by Charles Dhana.

- "Beauty Iva Sweety" – Gana Harish, Rap King Madhan
- "60 Ippo 20 Aanadhe" – Charles Dhana, Rap King Madhan
- "Kanna Enna Mayakkiputa" – Gana Padhma
- "Sound of Lion" – Charles Dhana
- "Bluewhale Beauty" – Charles Dhana

== Release ==
The film had a low profile opening across Tamil Nadu on 24 May 2019. A critic from Deccan Chronicle noted "the director has to be commended for taking a new storyline and executing it without much confusion", and "though it was touted to be science fiction, the way it has been treated in a light hearted manner without many jargons and a crisp run time of 110 minutes makes it a delightful watch." In its review, The Times of India gave a negative impression and wrote that "the plot, which has scope for an intriguing thriller, goes haywire from the word go."
