= Simla Special =

- Theatrical release poster
- Directed by: Muktha Srinivasan
- Written by: Visu
- Produced by: Muktha V. Ramaswamy
- Starring: Kamal Haasan; Sripriya; S. Ve. Shekher; Y. G. Mahendran
- Cinematography: M. Karnan
- Edited by: V. P. Krishnan; C. R. Shanmugam
- Music by: M. S. Viswanathan
- Production company: Muktha Films
- Release date: 14 April 1982
- Country: India
- Language: Tamil

Simla Special is a 1982 Indian Tamil-language comedy film directed by Muktha Srinivasan, starring Kamal Haasan in the lead role. S. V. Shekher, Sripriya, Thengai Srinivasan, Y. G. Mahendran and Manorama appear in supporting roles. It was released on 14 April 1982.

== Plot ==
Gopu is a budding theatre artist. He and his close friend Babu own a popular troupe that performs low-budget comedy plays. To help Babu pay for his sister's wedding, they accept a commission to perform a set of plays for Tamils in Simla. One of the plays is titled Simla Special.

While Kamal is in Simla, Babu receives a telegram intended for Gopu informing him of Gopu's mother being seriously ill. Fearing the loss of the money if they renege on the Simla commission, Babu keeps the information from Gopu. Gopu subsequently finds out about his mother's illness when a friend calls to tell him that her condition has worsened. However, for the sake of his friend's sister, he decides to continue acting. He also keeps the information to himself, thinking that if Babu knew, he'd insist that Gopu go back to be by his mother's side.

On the last day of their engagement, Gopu finds the telegram in Babu's coat pocket and realises his friend's deception. He breaks off his friendship with Babu — but is forced to stay for one last encore before he leaves. While he is performing, Babu receives a call that Gopu's mother has recovered. All is forgiven and the friends reunite.

== Cast ==
- Kamal Haasan as Gopu
- S. Ve. Shekher as Babu
- Sripriya as Mahalakshmi
- Thengai Srinivasan as Mahalakshmi's Father
- Vennira Aadai Moorthy as Sabha Secretary
- Manorama as Roja Devi
- Shanthi Krishna as Uma, Babu's sister
- Y. G. Mahendran as Vasu
- Vanitha as Sri Sri
- Delhi Ganesh as Sundaram
- Kamala Kamesh as Babu's Mother
- Pushpalatha as Gopu's Mother
- Sivachandran as Thief
- V. Gopalakrishnan as Rtd Judge R. Bhaskar's Father
- Kathadi Ramamurthy as Gurbani
- Hanumanthu as Simla Tamil Sangam Wise President
- Typist Gopu as Arthanaari
- Aisary Velan as Rikshaw Driver
- Gundu Kalyanam
- Usilai Mani as prospective bridegroom's father
- Loose Mohan as prospective bridegroom for Uma
- Oru Viral Krishna Rao
- Gandhimathi
- Vairam Krishnamoorthy
- R. Bhaskar as V. Gopalakrishnan's Son

== Production ==
Kamal Haasan, besides acting as the male lead, also choreographed one song in the film: "Unakenna Mele Ninraai". The film was mainly shot in Shimla, Himachal Pradesh.

== Soundtrack ==
The soundtrack was composed by M. S. Viswanathan, with lyrics by Vaali. The song "Unakenna Mele Ninraai" is set in Sindhu Bhairavi raga.

Track listing
No.	Title	Singers	Length
1.	"Unakenna Mele Ninraai"	S. P. Balasubrahmanyam	4:48
2.	"Thanjavur Melam"	S. P. Balasubrahmanyam, Malaysia Vasudevan	4:55
3.	"Look Love Me Dear"	S. P. Balasubrahmanyam, S. Janaki	4:35
4.	"Kuthura Kuthulla"	Malaysia Vasudevan, Manorama	4:20
Total length:			18:38

== Reception ==
Kalki gave the film a mixed review, criticising the story, cinematography for not perfectly capturing Shimla but praised Shekher's acting. Saavi praised the film's humour and cinematography.
