= Poojaikku Vandha Malar =

1965 film directed by Muktha Srinivasan

- Theatrical release poster
- Directed by: Muktha Srinivasan
- Written by: K. Balachander
- Produced by: Muktha Srinivasan
- Starring: Gemini Ganesan; Nagesh; R. Muthuraman; Savithri
- Cinematography: Nemai Ghosh
- Edited by: L. Balu
- Music by: Viswanathan–Ramamoorthy
- Production company: Muktha Films
- Release date: 12 March 1965
- Running time: 161 minutes
- Country: India
- Language: Tamil

Poojaikku Vandha Malar (transl. The flower that came for the puja) is a 1965 Indian Tamil-language film produced and directed by Muktha Srinivasan, and written by K. Balachander. The film stars Gemini Ganesan, Nagesh, R. Muthuraman and Savithri. It was released on 12 March 1965 and became a commercial success.

== Plot ==
Suresh and Ravi are close friends who, after a misunderstanding, become enemies. Suresh falls in love with Ravi's sister Chitra, unaware that she is the sister of his friend-turned enemy. Once aware, he breaks up with her and vows never to marry her. Undaunted and determined to marry Suresh, Chitra comes to his house to live with him. The misunderstanding is ultimately cleared, Suresh and Ravi reconcile, and Suresh marries Chitra.

== Cast ==
Male cast

- Gemini Ganesan as Suresh
- Nagesh as Panju
- R. Muthuraman as Ravi
- S. V. Sahasranamam as Ravi's father
- S. Rama Rao as Gothandam
- O. A. K. Thevar

Female cast

- Savitri as Chitra
- Pandari Bai as Suresh's mother
- Manimala as Maala
- Manorama as Manju
- Samikkannu as Textile shop owner
- Sandhya as Ravi and Chitra's mother
- Chitra Devi

== Production ==
Poojaikku Vandha Malar was directed by Muktha Srinivasan who also produced it under his own company Muktha Films, and written by K. Balachander.

== Soundtrack ==
The soundtrack and score were composed by Viswanathan–Ramamoorthy, a duo consisting of M. S. Viswanathan and T. K. Ramamoorthy. The song "Maiyendhum Vizhiyodu", set in Pahadi attained popularity.

Track listing
No.	Title	Lyrics	Singer(s)	Length
1.	"Maiyendhum Vizhiyodu"	Vaali	P. Susheela, P. B. Sreenivas	4:19
2.	"Unnai Oorkondu"	Vaali	P. Susheela	3:56
3.	"Ven Palingu Medai"	Alangudi Somu	Sirkazhi Govindarajan, L. R. Eswari	3:57
4.	"Kaalgal Nindrathu"	Vaali	L. R. Eswari, A. L. Raghavan	3:27
Total length:				15:39

== Release and reception ==
Poojaikku Vantha Malar was released on 12 March 1965, and emerged a commercial success. The Indian Express stated, "Poojaikku Vantha Malar is not all roses. Nor is it mere paper. It is a mixed bunch, mildly fragrant, moderately attractive that can decorate the table if not adorn the head." The reviewer praised the performances of the cast, especially the comedy subplot featuring Nagesh as an absent-minded insurance agent, and the photography by Nemai Ghosh, but criticised the background score, climax and editing, concluding, "But director [Muktha] Srinivasan and writer K. Balachander are watchful enough to prevent Malar from withering away." Kalki called it a flower that bloomed amidst many forest plants.
