= Panithirai =

1961 film by Muktha Srinivasan

- Theatrical release poster
- Directed by: V. Srinivasan
- Screenplay by: G. Balasubramaniam
- Based on: Ardhangini
- Produced by: V. Ramaswamy
- Starring: Gemini Ganesan; B. Saroja Devi
- Cinematography: Nemai Ghosh
- Edited by: T. Vijaya Rangam; K. Durairaj
- Music by: K. V. Mahadevan
- Production company: Muktha Films
- Release date: 29 December 1961
- Running time: 180 minutes
- Country: India
- Language: Tamil

Panithirai (transl. A screen of dew) is a 1961 Indian Tamil-language film, directed by V. Srinivasan and produced by his brother Ramaswamy. The film stars Gemini Ganesan, B. Saroja Devi, K. A. Thangavelu and T. S. Balaiah. A remake of the Hindi film Ardhangini (1959), it revolves around a village girl who is shunned by everyone in her village as they believe she brings bad luck. She falls in love with, and marries a non-superstitious airline pilot, but problems arise when his aeroplane goes missing. The film was released on 29 December 1961.

== Plot ==
Shakuntala is born to a villager whose wife dies during childbirth, leading the community to brand the newborn as abasagunam (bad luck). She grows up facing constant mistreatment, with only her father supporting her. When she reaches marriageable age, a match is arranged.

But the money her father saved in a chit fund is lost when the fund collapses. In frustration, he blames her supposed ill‑luck, though he later regrets it. Just as things are settling down, the groom’s family rejects Shakuntala after hearing rumors about her being abasagunam. Heartbroken, her father dies, leaving Shakuntala burdened with the belief that she caused both her parents’ deaths.

Meanwhile, Mohan, a pilot who mocks superstition, scolds a gardener for delaying his departure over a black‑cat crossing his path. Shakuntala, now orphaned, is taken in by Mohan’s friend Santhanam, who promises her a job at Mohan’s father’s office. She meets Mohan while he is gardening and mistakes him for a gardener before learning who he really is.

Mohan and Shakuntala fall in love, but when he introduces her to his family, his parents realize she is the girl they once rejected. His stepmother insists Shakuntala brings misfortune and opposes the marriage. Despite this, the couple marries. The next day Mohan is told he has lost his pilot job—only to learn it was an April Fool’s prank.

More misunderstandings follow, mostly fueled by the stepmother. Mohan is eventually assigned to fly with confidential documents. The stepmother stops Shakuntala from seeing him off, fearing bad luck. The plane crashes, and although everyone believes Mohan is dead, Shakuntala refuses to accept it. She is tormented further and finally thrown out of the house.

Rumors then spread that Mohan survived and betrayed the country by selling secrets to foreign powers. Is Mohan truly alive, and what becomes of Shakuntala?

== Cast ==
- Gemini Ganesan as Mohan
- B. Saroja Devi as Shakuntala
- K. A. Thangavelu as Santhanam
- T. S. Balaiah as Mohan's father
- S. V. Subbaiah as Shakunthala's father
- M. Saroja
- M. Lakshmi Prabha
- M. S. Sundari Bai

== Production ==
Panithirai, a remake of the Hindi film Ardhangini (1959), was the first film produced by V. Srinivasan and his brother V. Ramaswamy's banner Muktha Films. While Srinivasan directed, both he and Ramaswamy served as producers, although Ramaswamy remained the sole credited producer. The screenplay was written by G. Balasubramaniam, the editing was handled by T. Vijaya Rangam and K. Durairaj, and cinematography by Nemai Ghosh. The final length of the film was 16,754 feet (5,107 m).

== Themes ==
The film is about superstition and how it affects normalcy in life.

== Soundtrack ==
The music was composed by K. V. Mahadevan with lyrics by Kannadasan and Kothamangalam Subbu.

Song	Singers	Lyrics	Length
"April Fool"	P. Susheela, L. R. Eswari, A. L. Raghavan	Kothamangalam Subbu	3:33
"Irukkumidam"	P. Susheela	Kannadasan	3:36
"Kungummathai"	P. Susheela	Kannadasan	3:46
"Mamiyarukku"	Sirkazhi Govindarajan, T. V. Rathnam	Kothamangalam Subbu	3:33
"Orey Kelvi"	P. B. Srinivas, P. Susheela	Kannadasan	3:33
"Varuga Varuga"	P. Susheela	Kannadasan	3:29
"Yedho Manidhan"	P. B. Srinivas	Kannadasan	3:21

== Release and reception ==
Panithirai was released on 29 December 1961. Link disliked the original Hindi film and added, "In this aspect [Panithirai] sports yet another moral: Never remake a bore". The Indian Express wrote on 6 January 1962, "Pani Thirai is a deeply moving human drama providing clean wholesome entertainment acceptable to general film going tastes". Kanthan of Kalki reviewed the film more negatively, criticising the title for its lack of relevance to the story.
