= Anbai Thedi =

1974 film

- Theatrical release poster
- Directed by: Muktha Srinivasan
- Story by: Kalaignanam
- Produced by: Muktha Ramaswamy
- Starring: Sivaji Ganesan; Jayalalithaa
- Cinematography: N. Balakrishnan
- Edited by: L. Balu
- Music by: M. S. Viswanathan
- Production company: Muktha Films
- Distributed by: Elite Movies
- Release date: 13 November 1974
- Country: India
- Language: Tamil

Anbai Thedi (transl. In Search of Love) is a 1974 Indian Tamil-language film, directed by Muktha Srinivasan. The film stars Sivaji Ganesan and Jayalalithaa. It was released on 13 November 1974.

== Cast ==
- Sivaji Ganesan as Ramu
- Jayalalithaa as Rani
- C. R. Vijayakumari as Janaki
- Major Sundarrajan as Rajasekar
- Srikanth as Suresh
- Shubha as Radha
- R. S. Manohar as Mannaru
- Cho as Virunthali Mama
- Manorama as Annam
- Senthamarai as Veerasamy
- K. Kannan as Nagappan
- C. I. D. Sakunthala (guest role)
- S. N. Parvathy
- Baby Indra as Rajasekar's daughter

== Production ==
Muktha Srinivasan commended Jayalalithaa's commitment to the film and her punctuality at the shootings, saying she "used to be ready with make up and costumes on the set" even before filming began. The scene where Shubha tries to steal from Ganesan's home was shot at Karpagam Studios. A set resembling Manuneedhi Cholan costing ₹1 lakh (equivalent to ₹30 lakh or US$31,000 in 2023) was built at Karpagam Studios. The final length of the film was 4,507.00 metres (14,786.75 ft).

== Soundtrack ==
The music was composed by M. S. Viswanathan, with lyrics by Kannadasan.

Song	Singers	Length
"Budhi Ketta Ponnu Onnu"	T. M. Soundararajan, P. Susheela	03:41
"Chithira Mandapathil"	T. M. Soundararajan, Jayalalithaa	04:32
"Ammavum Appavum"	T. M. Soundararajan, Pushpalatha	04:06
"Sippiyile Muthu"	Vani Jairam	04:30
"Kalyanam Illamal"	T. M. Soundararajan, P. Susheela	04:30

== Reception ==
Kanthan of Kalki appreciated Thooyavan's dialogues, Srinivasan's direction, the film's colour and cast performances.
