= Imayam =

- Poster
- Directed by: Muktha Srinivasan
- Written by: A. S. Prakasam
- Produced by: Muktha Ramaswamy
- Starring: Sivaji Ganesan; Srividya; Jai Ganesh; Thengai Srinivasan
- Cinematography: N. Balakrishnan
- Edited by: V. P. Krishnan; R. Shanmugam
- Music by: M. S. Viswanathan
- Production company: Muktha Films
- Release date: 21 July 1979
- Country: India
- Language: Tamil

Imayam (transl. Himalayan) is a 1979 Indian Tamil-language film, directed by Muktha Srinivasan and produced by Muktha Ramaswamy. The film stars Sivaji Ganesan, Srividya, Jai Ganesh and Thengai Srinivasan. It was released on 21 July 1979.

== Plot ==
Gangadharan (Sivaji Ganesan) and his wife (Srividya) are a childless couple who bring up Gangadharan's wife's sister, Sindhu. When Gangadharan finds out that Sindhu is in love with Krishna (Jai Ganesh), his partner's son, he encourages her. What he does not know is that Krishna is a womanizer who pretends to be an overly virtuous person. He has a lover Narmada, who is Gangadharan's secretary and even had a son with her called Jamuna (Malashri, credited as Baby Durga). Krishna plays a double game of courting Sindhu, while professing his love and faithfulness to Narmada. Narmada believes his lies completely until one day she finds out through the grapevine that Krishna has gotten engaged to Sindhu. When she confronts him, he finally confesses his duplicity and says he is dumping her for Sindhu and offers Narmada the role of a mistress. Narmada pleads with him and commits suicide when he refused to budge. Narmada had written a letter to Gangadharan outlining everything and asked Jamuna to deliver it before her death. On the way to deliver it, Jamuna shows the letter to Oogly, Narmada's brother who is a fugitive from the law. He realizes his sister is now dead due to Krishna's cruel behavior and vows revenge.

Meanwhile Jamuna gives Narmada's letter to Gangadharan, who attempts to expose Krishna through his son-- but the wily Krishna is always a step ahead, anticipates Gangadharan's moves and discredits his every effort to expose him.

Firstly, Krishna convinces Jamuna that a particular tree provides chocolates when struck. When Gangadharan brings Sindhu, Jamuna and Krishna's family to the first place where Narmada and Krishna met and when Jamuna states so and identifies Krishna as his father, Krishna asks him to tell the chocolate tree theory, which Jamuna does. Everyone laughs, which discredits Jamuna as a fabulous storyteller and completely demolishes Jamuna's earlier testimony about Narmada and Krishna. Next, when Gangadharan brings Krishna's family to a place where he expects Sindhu and Krishna to be intimate, thereby exposing Krishna as a womanizer, Krishna anticipating it, pretends to rebuff Sindhu's advances and shows himself as a righteous man and Gangadharan as a fool. Finally, when Gangadharan brings Oogly to Krishna's birthday party to expose him--Krishna, knowing Oogly to be a fugitive on the run, brings a policeman to the party, which causes Oogly to panic and run away, thereby frustrating Gangadharan for the third time.

Krishna pushes for his marriage with Sindhu and it appears that Gangadharan has failed to expose him, until an employee at Gangadharan's office who was cleaning out the dead Narmada's desk, finds Jamuna's birth certificate which has his father's name listed--but smudged due to Narmada's tears. Ecstatic, Gangadharan goes to the hospital and gets the original certificate and affidavit with Krishna's signature, acknowledging him as Narmada's partner and Jamuna's father.

Gangadharan confronts Krishna with this undisputable evidence when he arrogantly mocked Gangadharan's failure to expose him. Krishna begs for mercy, but Gangadharan is unmoved and vows to expose and shame Krishna for his despicable lies and jilting Narmada, thereby driving her to suicide and denying Jamuna as his son. Krishna then repents and wholeheartedly reforms--and even saves Jamuna's life. Seeing this, Gangadharan has a heart and forgives Krishna and even lies to everyone that he is mistaken and Krishna is a righteous man, thereby invoking mockery and ridicule upon himself for his stubborn, failed efforts to expose Krishna.

Krishna is moved by Gangadharan's actions, but weeps that it is all in vain, as Oogly will kill him on his wedding day. Gangadharan then rushes to Oogly's hideout and fails to stop him from his mission to kill Krishna. Gangadharan then rushes to the wedding and takes the bullet meant for Krishna. Krishna then exposes his duplicity towards Narmada and acknowledges Jamuna as his son voluntarily--and begs everyone for forgiveness. Oogly too repents and is now at peace. Sindhu marries Krishna with Gangadharan's blessings and the movie ends on a happy note.

== Cast ==
- Sivaji Ganesan as Gangadharan
- Srividya as Gangadharan's wife
- Thengai Srinivasan
- Jai Ganesh as Krishna
- Yamana
- K. Kannan
- Y. G. Mahendran
- S. Yogalingam
- Manorama
- Meera
- C. I. D. Sakunthala
- Reena
- S. N. Parvathy
- Vijaya Chandrika
- Malashri (credited as Baby Durga) as Jamuna

== Production ==
The filming was held at Kathmandu, Nepal.

== Soundtrack ==
The music is composed by M. S. Viswanathan, with lyrics by Kannadasan. The song "Gangai Yamunai" is set in Madhyamavati raga.

Song title	Singers
"Gangai Yamunai"	K. J. Yesudas, Vani Jairam
"Imayam Kanden"	S. P. Balasubrahmanyam, B. S. Sasirekha
"Kannile Kudiyirunthu"	T. M. Soundararajan, L. R. Anjali
"Sakthi Ennada"	T. M. Soundararajan, S. P. Balasubrahmanyam

== Critical reception ==
Kutty Krishnan of Kalki praised the film's visuals but criticised the story.
