= Muktha Ramaswamy =

Indian film producer

- Born: Venkatachary Ramaswamy; 1927
- Died: 1988
- Occupations: Film Producer, Muktha Films
- Children: Muktha R. Govind

Muktha Ramaswamy was an Indian film producer who worked in the Tamil film industry. He was the elder brother of famous director Muktha Srinivasan.

== Partial filmography ==
Year	Film	Language	Notes
1961	Panithirai	Tamil	
1967	Thavapudhalavan	Tamil	
1968	Bommalattam	Tamil	
1969	Nirai Kudam	Tamil	Producer
1971	Arunodhayam	Tamil	
1973	Anbai Thedi	Tamil	
1978	Andaman Kadhali	Tamil	
1979	Imayam	Tamil	
1982	Simla Special	Tamil	
1982	Paritchaikku Neramaachu	Tamil	
1983	Sivappu Sooriyan	Tamil	
1984	Iru Medhaigal	Tamil	
1985	Oru Malarin Payanam	Tamil	
1988	Katha Nayagan	Tamil	
