= Thenmazhai =

- Poster
- Directed by: Muktha Srinivasan
- Screenplay by: Cho
- Produced by: V. Ramaswamy
- Starring: Gemini Ganesan; K. R. Vijaya
- Cinematography: M. Karnan
- Edited by: E. Arunachalam
- Music by: T. K. Ramamoorthy
- Production company: Muktha Films
- Release date: 23 September 1966
- Running time: 142 minutes
- Country: India
- Language: Tamil

Thenmazhai (transl. Honey Rain) is a 1966 Indian Tamil-language romantic comedy film, directed by Muktha Srinivasan and produced by V. Ramasamy. The film stars Gemini Ganesan and K. R. Vijaya, with Major Sundarrajan, Nagesh, Cho, Sachu and Manorama in supporting roles. It was released on 23 September 1966.

== Plot ==
Basker is a sleepwalker. Nagalingam accuses Basker of killing Chithambaram while asleep and uses it to blackmail him into performing various acts. Nirmala is in love with Basker and married him in secrecy. Finally, Nagalingam wants Basker to marry a rich girl, Girija, and give all the dowry money to him in return for destroying the evidence Nagalingam allegedly has of Basker's guilt. Nirmala's brother, Venu and Chithambaram's son, Vasu, combine their resources to expose Nagalingam as the killer of Chithambaram.

Indra acts as the romantic angle between Vasu and Venu as they vie for her attention with the former acting as a doctor to get her respect and the latter acting as an paralytic patient to get her sympathy in an attempt to impress her providing the comedic angle as well as prove their mettle and ingenuity which comes in handy to handle the cunning Nagalingam.

== Cast ==
- Gemini Ganesan as Baskar
- K. R. Vijaya as Nirmala
- Major Sundarrajan as Nagalingam
- Nagesh as Venu
- Cho as Chithambaram/Vasu
- Manorama as Indra
- Sachu as Girija
- T. P. Muthulakshmi as Appadurai's wife
- Vennira Aadai Moorthy as Muthu
- S. Rama Rao as Appadurai

== Production ==
The film features animated introductory credits.

== Soundtrack ==
Music was by T. K. Ramamoorthy Lyrics by Vaali.

| Song | Singer | Length |
|---|---|---|
| "Aarambame Ippadithaan Therinchiko" | P. Susheela, Sarala | 03:24 |
| "Nenje Nee" | P. Susheela | 03:29 |
| "Kalyaana Sandhaiyile Kaadhal Vilai Poguma" | P Susheela | 03:05 |
| "Vizhiyaal Kaadhal Kadidham" | P. Susheela, T. M. Soundararajan | 03:19 |
| "Ennadi Sellakanne Ennam Enge Pogudhe" | Sarala | 03:11 |

== Reception ==
Kalki gave a mixed review, praising the performances of some of the actors, but criticising the music, and concluded that the film was overall unsatisfactory.
