= Mudhalali =

1957 film by Muktha Srinivasan

- Theatrical release poster
- Directed by: Muktha Srinivasan
- Written by: A. K. Venkat Ramanujam
- Based on: Mudhalali by A. K. Venkat Ramanujam
- Produced by: M. A. Venu
- Starring: S. S. Rajendran; Devika
- Cinematography: K. Ramachandran
- Edited by: T. Vijayarangam
- Music by: K. V. Mahadevan
- Production company: M. A. V. Pictures
- Distributed by: Radhakrishna Films
- Release date: 22 October 1957
- Running time: 160 minutes
- Country: India
- Language: Tamil

Mudhalali (transl. Proprietor) is a 1957 Indian Tamil-language drama film, the directorial debut of Muktha Srinivasan and written by Venkat Ramanujam. The film was produced by M. A. Venu under M. A. V. Pictures. It stars S. S. Rajendran and debutante Devika, while M. N. Rajam, A. Kannaiyan and T. P. Muthulakshmi play supporting roles. The film's soundtrack and background score were composed by K. V. Mahadevan, while the lyrics for the songs were written by Ka. Mu. Sheriff.

K. Ramachandran and T. Vijayarangam handled cinematography and editing respectively. The film is based on Ramanujam's stage play of the same name. Film development started during the making of Sampoorna Ramayanam, whose own production was temporarily shelved. The film was released on 22 October 1957 and became a box office hit, establishing the career of actors Rajendran, Devika and Srinivasan. It was remade in Telugu as Mundadugu (1958) and in Malayalam as Muthalali (1965).

== Plot ==
Vasanthan goes to the United States to further his education. During his absence, his widowed mother Karpagam manages their glass factory in Salem with the help of manager Balu, who has a relationship with Vasanthan's cousin Kokilam. Since Vasanthan's mother does not understand how to run the factory, Balu brings everything under his control and swindles the company by various means. Vasanthan returns to India several years later. He lands at Bombay en route to Madras in order to reach Salem. While there, he meets a hotel boy, Poongavanam, who causes Vasanthan to realise the need to understand the life of a worker before becoming a factory owner. He informs his mother that he has to go on another tour and will arrive in Salem in two months, but lands in Salem as a worker under the pseudonym Varadhan. He joins the factory with the help of Valli, who works in the factory with her father.

Slowly, Vasanthan comes to understand the misdeeds of Balu in managing the factory, and learns of his cousin Kokilam's relationship with Balu. Meanwhile, Vasanthan and Valli fall in love. Vasanthan's mother becomes desperate to find her son and starts spending money to trace him. Vasanthan decides to reveal his true identity and goes out of town. Balu has an eye on Valli, and when she does not accept his lecherous advances, he throws her and her father out of the factory quarters. They leave in search of Varadhan, who has left Salem. When Vasanthan returns, his mother becomes happy. He meets the workers and promises changes since he now understands the misdeeds of the manager. Gradually, he starts addressing all the workers' issues. Manager Balu is kept in his place and brought under control. Unable to accept his reduced status, and being under excessive control, Balu starts spreading rumours that Vasanthan is not the real owner, but an imposter. Varadhan has come as Vasanthan. Even Vasanthan's mother starts doubting this, since Vasanthan (who was found of Kokilam before going abroad) is not behaving as before with her. Vasanthan proves that he is the real owner and exposes all of Balu's misdeeds. With the help of a cycle-rickshaw puller, he traces Valli in Madras (who had gone there in search of him) brings her back, and marries her.

== Cast ==
- S. S. Rajendran as Vasanthan/Varathan
- Devika as Valli
- M. N. Rajam as Kokilam (Vasanthan's Cousin)
- T. K. Ramachandran as Balu (Kokilam's fiancé)
- S. S. Sivasooryan as Murugesan
- C. T. Rajakantham as Karpagam (Vasanthan's Mother)
- T. P. Muthulakshmi as Senthamarai, (Vasanthan's house maid)
- Lakshmi Rajyam as Cameo Appearance
- R. Pakkirisamy as Poongavanam (Valli's Brother)
- Ennatha Kannaiya as Gopal

== Production and release ==
M. A. Venu who produced Sampoorna Ramayanam at the same time, had only 10 days in a month to shoot that film, since many artists involved were busy with other commitments. To make use of the remaining 20 days, Venu bought the rights for the stage play Mudhalali and chose Srinivasan to make his directorial debut. Unlike most films, this film's production was completed in four months and two days within the budget of ₹2 lakh (worth ₹11 crore in 2021 prices). Pramila, who was given the screen name Devika, made her acting debut. Rajendran was paid ₹7,000 while both Devika and Srinivasan were paid ₹5,000. The film returned 900 per cent on investment in opening week.

== Soundtrack ==
The film's soundtrack and background score were composed by K. V. Mahadevan, while the lyrics for the songs were written by Ka. Mu. Sheriff. The song "Yeri Karaiyin Mele" is set in Arabhi raga.

Songs	Singers	Length
"Yeri Karaiyin Mele"	T. M. Soundararajan	03:28
"Yawwana Ranithaan"	Jikki	02:48
"Yengirundho Vandhaar"	M. S. Rajeswari	02:48
"Kunguma Pottukkaaraa"	T. M. Soundararajan & M. S. Rajeswari	03:22
"Chikkanama Vazhum"	A. G. Rathnamala & G. Kasthoori	04:51
"Enga Mudhalaali Thanga"	V. N. Sundharam, S. V. Ponnusamy, A. G. Rathnamala & G. Kasthoori	05:24
"Aasai Kalyaanam"	M. S. Rajeswari	03:20
"Kaalamadi Kaalam"	Seerkazhi Govindarajan	03:19

== Accolades ==
The film received a certificate from the National Film Award for Best Feature Film in Tamil (Best regional language film) for the year.

== Bibliography ==
- Dhananjayan, G. (2014). Pride of Tamil Cinema: 1931–2013. Blue Ocean Publishers. OCLC 898765509.
