= Arunodhayam =

- Theatrical release poster
- Directed by: Muktha Srinivasan
- Written by: 'Madurai' Thirumaran
- Produced by: Muktha V. Ramaswamy
- Starring: Sivaji Ganesan; B. Saroja Devi; R. Muthuraman; Lakshmi
- Cinematography: N. S. Varma
- Edited by: E. V. Shanmugam
- Music by: K. V. Mahadevan
- Production company: Muktha Films
- Release date: 5 March 1971
- Country: India
- Language: Tamil

Arunodhayam (transl. Sunrise) is a 1971 Indian Tamil-language film, directed by Muktha Srinivasan and produced by V. Ramasamy. The film stars Sivaji Ganesan, B. Saroja Devi, R. Muthuraman and Lakshmi. It was released on 5 March 1971.

== Plot ==
Prabhu and Nirmala are siblings. Nirmala falls in love with Arun and tells her brother about her feelings. Prabhu is surprised and decides to meet Arun, but learns that Arun is a drunkard. The story continues with how Prabhu faces this problem and marries off Nirmala to Arun.

== Cast ==
- Sivaji Ganesan as Prabhu
- B. Saroja Devi as Shanthi
- R. Muthuraman as Arun
- Lakshmi as Nirmala
- Anjali Devi as Prabhu and Nirmala's mother
- V. S. Raghavan as Viswanathan
- V. Gopalakrishnan as Antony Morasis
- Cho as Dr. Siranjeevi
- Manorama as Radha
- Thengai Srinivasan as Nithyanandan
- Vennira Aadai Moorthy as Information Bureau (I.B) officer
- Jayakumari as Dancer
- Kanakadurga as Club Dancer
- Neelu as Rowdy Ranga
- Kuladeivam Rajagopal as Mani
- S. Rama Rao as Rama
- Senthamarai as Jambu
- K. Kannan as Prakash as Car Racer
- Comedy Shanmugam as Shanmugam

== Soundtrack ==
The music was composed by K. V. Mahadevan, with lyrics by Kannadasan.

Song	Singers	Length
"Enga Veettu Thanga Theril"	S. P. Balasubrahmanyam, P. Susheela	03:24
"Muthu Pavalam Mukkani"	T. M. Soundararajan, P. Susheela	03:48
"Etharkkum Thayar"	L. R. Eswari	03:16
"Ulagam Aayiram Sollattum"	T. M. Soundararajan	03:38
"Yemmadi Neenga"	Manorama	03:21
