= M. Karnan =

Indian cinematographer and director

M. Karnan (c. 1933 – 13 December 2012) was an Indian cinematographer and director who mainly worked in Tamil cinema. Starting his career as an assistant to V. Ramamurthi, Karnan gradually rose to a full-fledged cinematographer, and made a few films based on curry western featuring Jaishankar in the lead. In an interview to Behindwoods, cinematographer Ravi K. Chandran mentioned Karnan as an inspiration and noted the way he made films. He had a very good heart and he was a pure soul . He had helped many in his times. After prolonged illness, he died on 13 December 2012.

== Filmography ==
Director

- Kalam Vellum (1970)
- Ganga (1972)
- Jakkamma (1972)
- Enga Pattan Sothu (1975)
- Ore Thanthai (1976)
- Edharkum Thunindhavan (1976)
- Jamboo (1980)
- Pudhiya Thoranangal (1980)
- Avanukku Nigar Avane (1982)
- Sattathukku Oru Saval (1983)
- Idhu Engal Bhoomi (1984)
- Aandavan Sothu (1985)
- Jansi Rani (1985)
- Karuppu Sattaikaran (1985)
- Vettai Puli (1986)
- Rettai Kuzhal Thuppakki (1989)
- Nallathai Naadu Kekum (1991)

Cinematographer only

- Sabaash Meena (1958)
- President Panchatcharam (1959)
- Kadavulin Kuzhandhai (1960)
- Sangilithevan (1960)
- Thangarathinam (1960)
- Deivathin Deivam (1962)
- Sarada (1962)
- Karpagam (1963)
- Kai Kodutha Deivam (1964)
- Anandhi (1965)
- Neela Vaanam (1965)
- Kalyana Mandapam (1965)
- Thenmazhai (1966)
- Naam Moovar (1966)
- Uyir Mel Aasai (1967)
- Andru Kanda Mugam (1968)
- Nirai Kudam (1969)
- Thirumagal (1971)
- Veettuku Veedu (1970)
- Madhuraiyai Meetta Sundharapandiyan (1978)
- Polladhavan (1980)
- Keezh Vaanam Sivakkum (1981)
- Simla Special (1982)
- Paritchaikku Neramaachu (1982)
- Sivappu Sooriyan (1983)
- Iru Medhaigal (1984)
