= Sachu =

Tamil comedian and actress

- Born: Saraswathi Sundaresan Iyer; 7 January 1946 (age 80)
- Other name: Kumari Sachu
- Occupation: Actress
- Years active: 1952 – Present
- Parent(s): Sundaresan Iyer (Father) & Jayalakshmi (Mother)
- Relatives: Maadi Lakshmi (actress)
- Awards: Kalaimamani Award (1992)

Saraswathi Sundaresan Iyer, professionally known as Sachu, is an Indian actress who has acted in more than 500 films in five different languages and a few television serials. She is a character actress/comedienne who blends into the roles she has portrayed over five decades. She made her film début in 1952 in the film Rani at the age of 4, and has since been a prominent face on the silver screen. She started acting in television serials in 1995.

== Early life ==
Sachu was born into a large orthodox family of musicians, lawyers and teachers, it was not smooth sailing for the young actress, but her talent acted as the decisive factor. Permission was granted by her lawyer-father. As she teamed up with her sister, Maadi Lakshmi, for Bharatanatyam recitals, her film career forged ahead.

In 1953, Sachu, then less than four years old, was noticed by director A. S. A. Sami (of Velaikkari fame), who was in the process of casting her sister for a dance number. Sami cast her in the Bhanumathi-starrer Rani. Then followed the Arignar Anna-scripted Sorga Vaasal. As the younger Paro in Devadasu, her performance was endearing. The chubby-faced Sachu went on to fill the vacuum left by Baby Saroja.

Sachu performed alongside Bhanumathi, Padmini, Anjali Devi, or Savithri. The evergreen Maya Bazaar was her first 100-day film, and in the film, she played the cherubic Kutti Vatsala (Junior Savithri). She then took a small break during which she spent the interim perfecting her dance, giving recitals and playing sister roles. Her first film as heroine in Veera Thirumagan with C. R. Anandan, released in 1961.

She was offered the role of a comedian to act as Nagesh's pair in the film Kadhalikka Neramillai, This film starred Muthuraman, Nagesh, Kanchana, Rajasree and T. S. Balaiah. After the success of this film, she was put in comedian's role opposite actors like Suruli Rajan, "Thengai" Srinivasan, Cho Ramaswamy, Thangavelu, M. R. Vasu and M. R. Radha in many films from 1964 to 1989. She, Manorama and Jayalalithaa came together to act in 2 classic comedy films - Galata Kalyanam and Bommalattam. Her other notable films include Kalai Arasi, Delhi Mapillai, Thenmazhai, Sorgam, Ooty Varai Oravu, Thunaivan and Meenava Nanban.

The 1970s saw her taking to the stage, and her first play was PVR's Neerottam, where she played the famous Charu. She played a dual role in ARS' Deviyar Iruvar.

Since then, Sachu has been lending her talents out and has successfully starred in over 500 films playing varied roles, and has starred alongside veteran actors such as Sivaji Ganesan, M. G. Ramachandran, Muthuraman, S. A. Ashokan, Nagesh, Suruli Rajan, Thengai Srinivasan, Thangavelu and M. R. Radha.

The late 1970s and 1980s saw her playing supporting roles in films alongside Rajinikanth, Kamal Haasan, Chiranjeevi, and many others, while she has also played mother and grandmother roles to younger actors such as Vijay, Surya, Karthik, Sakthi Vasu and many others.

== Television career ==
She moved on to the small screen since 1995 and has starred in many serials such as Manbumigu Maamiyar, Costly Mappilay, Mel Maadi Gaali, Ananda Bhavan, Chellamma Vidiyal Pudithu, Oorarinda Rahasiyam, Mr. Brain, Pitchai Apartments (Kalakendra Humour and Drama), Podunalam Ponnuswamy (Kalakendra Humour and Drama), "Washingtonil Thirumanam" (Kalakendra Humour and Drama), Dinesh Ganesh and Veetukku Veedu Looty, where she quotes that she had been able to act in roles which she could not in cinema.

She also acted as Vijayakumar's elder sister in the serial Nandini, which aired on Sun TV.

== Awards ==
- 1992: Received title of Kalaimamani Award by the Government of Tamil Nadu, which is the highest state honour in the field of Arts.
- 1992: Awarded Thyaga Brahma Gana Sabha award, which was presented by M. S. Subbulakshmi.
- 2012: Honoured with the Nadaga Soodamani award by Sri Krishna Gana Sabha, Chennai.

== Partial filmography ==
=== Tamil films ===
Year	Title	Role	Notes
1952	Rani		
1952	Shyamala		
1953	Devadas		
1953	Avvaiyar		
1953	Marumagal		
1954	Sorgavasal		
1955	Kaveri		Sandhosham Kollame song dance-as child
1955	Kodeeswaran		Child Artist
1957	Mayabazar		
1960	Raja Desingu		
1962	Veera Thirumagan		
1962	Annai	Sarasu	
1963	Kalai Arasi		
1964	Kadhalikka Neramillai		
1966	Motor Sundaram Pillai		
1966	Thenmazhai		
1967	Bama Vijayam		
1967	Ninaivil Nindraval		
1967	Ooty Varai Uravu		
1968	Delhi Mapillai	Meghala	
1968	Galatta Kalyanam	Kaantha	
1968	Bommalattam	Geetha	
1968	Kallum Kaniyagum		
1968	Jeevanamsam		
1969	Poova Thalaiya		
1969	Kulavilakku		
1969	Nirai Kudam	Hema	
1969	Anbalippu	Chandra	
1970	Engirundho Vandhal		
1970	Sorgam		
1970	Maanavan	Ramu's wife	
1970	Mattukkara Velan	Kaveri	
1970	Penn Deivam		
1971	Uttharavindri Ulle Vaa	Nurse Sarasa	
1971	Thenum Paalum		
1971	Then Kinnam		
1971	Sumathi En Sundari		
1971	Kumari Kottam	Singhari	
1972	Annai Velankanni	Candle Seller Woman	
1972	Pillaiyo Pillai		
1972	Dhikku Theriyatha Kaattil		
1973	Deivamsam		
1974	Paruva Kaalam		
1974	Kai Niraya Kasu	Meena	
1974	Anbu Thangai		
1974	Thai Piranthal		
1974	Vairam		
1974	Athaiya Maamiya		
1974	Urumaikural		
1975	Avandhan Manidhan		
1975	Cinema Paithiyam		
1977	Dheepam		
1977	Unnai Suttrum Ulagam		
1978	Tripurasundari		
1978	Ival Oru Seethai		
1978	Anbalippu		
1979	Dharma Yuddham		
1979	Oru Vidukadhai Oru Thodarkadhai	Munusamy's second wife	
1979	Kandhar Alangaram		
1980	Ellam Un Kairasi		
1980	Sujatha		
1980	Geetha Oru Shenbagapoo		
1982	Oorukku Oru Pillai		
1986	Oomai Vizhigal		
1988	Solla Thudikuthu Manasu		
1988	Manasukkul Mathappu	Nurse Mary	
1992	Naangal		
1994	Priyanka		
1995	Avatharam		
1996	Tata Birla		
1999	Unakkaga Ellam Unakkaga		
1999	Endrendrum Kadhal		
2005	Priyasakhi		
2006	Jery		
2006	Unakkum Enakkum		
2008	Sadhu Miranda		
2009	Ainthaam Padai		
2010	Aatanayagan		
2010	Gowravargal		
2013	Thillu Mullu		
2013	Naiyaandi		
2014	Irumbu Kuthirai		
2016	Gethu	Vathsala Sadagoppan	
2016	Avan Aval		
2016	Kodi		
2016	Kadavul Irukaan Kumaru		
2016	Chennai 600028 II: Second Innings		
2018	Utharavu Maharaja		
2019	Perazhagi ISO		
2019	Ayogya		
2019	Jackpot		
2020	Dharala Prabhu	Kundhavai	
2021	Boom Boom Kaalai		
2022	Veetla Vishesham		
2022	The Legend		
2022	Naai Sekar Returns		
2023	Annapoorani: The Goddess of Food	Subbulakshmi Patti	
2024	Pon Ondru Kanden		
2025	Konjam Kadhal Konjam Modhal		

=== Malayalam films ===
Year	Title	Role	Notes
1965	Inapravugal	Ammini	
1965	Subhaidha	Salma	
1966	Kalyanayathrayil	Dancer	
1968	Dial 2244		
1969	Vilakkapetta Bandhangal		
1978	Balapareekshanam		
1978	Pathinalam Ravu		
1981	Dwanthayudham	Sarasamma	

=== Telugu films ===
Year	Title	Role	Notes
1952	Tingu Ranga		
1953	Ammalakkalu		
1953	Devadasu		
1957	Maya Bazaar		
2007	Shankar Dada Zindabad		

=== Hindi films ===
Year	Title	Role	Notes
1952	Rani		
1954	Bahut Din Huye		
