= Appathava Aattaya Pottutanga =

2021 Indian film

- Promotional release poster
- Directed by: Stephen Rangaraj
- Produced by: Jasmine
- Starring: Chandra Haasan; Sheela; Shanmugasundaram; Delhi Ganesh; Kathadi Ramamurthy
- Music by: S. Selvakumaar
- Production company: GB Studio Films
- Distributed by: SonyLIV
- Release date: 8 October 2021
- Running time: 100 mins
- Country: India
- Language: Tamil

Appathava Aattaya Pottutanga (transl. Grandma Has Been Wooed) is a 2021 Tamil language drama film directed by Stephen Rangaraj and produced by GB Studio Films. The film stars Chandrahasan, Sheela, Shanmugasundaram, Delhi Ganesh, and Kathadi Ramamurthy. The music was composed by S. Selvakumaar, and the film released on 8 October 2021.

== Plot ==
The story about four old men - Ramasamy (Chandrahasan), Sokkalingam (Shanmugasundaram), Suthanthiram (Delhi Ganesh), and Seenu (Kathadi Ramamurthy) - and one old lady Meenakshi (Sheela). Ramasamy and Meenakshi are left in an old age home by their respective children. Both of them decide to marry so that can relive from their loneliness during their old age. Sokkalingam, Suthanthiram, and Seenu help them elope from the old age home and get married, although their children oppose. The cat and dog search between the old couple and their children are continued until they seek help from police to get married. What happens next forms the rest of the story

== Cast ==
- Chandrahasan as Ramasamy
- Sheela as Meenakshi
- Shanmugasundaram as Sokkalingam
- Delhi Ganesh as Suthanthiram
- Kathadi Ramamurthy as Seenu
- Jaya Rao
- Ilavarasu
- Vinoth Munna as Shanmugham
- Tamil Selvi as Shanmugham's wife
- Rehana as Shanmugham's daughter
- Raj Sethupathy as Inspector Kalaikannan
- Dinesh (special appearance in "Enna Elavu Kathal")

== Production ==
Appathava Aattaya Pottutanga began production in 2016, with Kamal Haasan's elder brother Chandrahasan appearing in his first lead role. The story narrated the tale of how the relatives of senior citizens go against a love story taking place in an elderly home. Sheela, the mother of actor Vikranth, played the female lead role, while several other senior actors including Kathadi Ramamurthy and Shanmugasundaram were cast in supporting roles. Post-production began in January 2017, and Chandrahasan died in March 2017.

== Release and reception ==
The film was released, after a four year delay, on the SonyLIV streaming platform on 8 October 2021. Avinash Ramachandran of Cinema Express gave the film a mixed review stating it was "a no-frills tale about the twilight years". A critic from Dinamalar gave the film two out of five stars. OTTplay noted "had the makers focused on a better screenplay, the decent plot would have worked, given the number of experienced artists in the film".
