= Delhi Ganesh =

Indian actor (1944–2024)

Kalaimamani Delhi Ganesh

Personal details
- Born: Ganesan Mahadevan; 1 August 1944 Keezhapavur, Tinnevely District, Madras Province, British India (now in Tenkasi district, Tamil Nadu, India)
- Died: 9 November 2024 (aged 80) Chennai, Tamil Nadu, India
- Spouse: Thangam Ganesh
- Children: 3
- Profession: IAF Corporal (Retired), Actor (1976-2024)

Military service
- Allegiance: India
- Branch/service: Indian Air Force
- Years of service: 1964–1974
- Rank: Corporal
- Battles/wars: 1965 Indo-Pakistani war (auxiliary); 1971 Indo-Pakistani war (auxiliary)

Ganesan Mahadevan (1 August 1944 – 9 November 2024), known by his stage name Delhi Ganesh, was an Indian actor who mostly acted in supporting roles in Tamil cinema and TV serials. He was well known for the versatility of roles he played. He acted in more than 400 films. He was given the stage name Delhi Ganesh by K. Balachander, who had introduced him to Tamil film industry through Pattina Pravesam (1976).

== Early life ==
He was born as Ganesan on 1 August 1944 in Keezhapavur, a town in present-day Tenkasi district of Tamil Nadu. The town was the native place of his mother Pichu. However, Ganesan's early education was in Vallanadu (in present-day Thoothukudi district), the native place of his father Mahadevan, a school teacher. He had an elder sister and a younger brother.

== Career ==
After completing SSLC, Ganesan went to Madurai and worked in TVS Motor Company. Then, he was recruited by the Indian Air Force (IAF) and served from 1964 to 1974. During this time, he went on to become a corporal, and was deputed as an auxiliary personnel in Jammu and Kashmir during the 1965 and 1971 Indo-Pakistani wars. During this period, he acted in plays staged by the Delhi-based theatre troupe, Dakshina Bharata Nataka Sabha.

After quitting the IAF, he joined Kathadi Ramamurthi's troupe. During his stint there, he received breakthrough for portraying the role of Kuselar in the play Dowry Kalyana Vaibhogame. Ganesh's performance as Kuselar eventually caught the attention of director K. Balachander, who eventually cast Ganesh in his directorial venture Pattina Pravesam and Ganesh flourished in the role under the watchful eye of Balachander. He also had a short stint working as a stenographer in the Food Corporation of India in Chennai.

Ganesh played the lead role in the 1981 film Engamma Maharani. He was best known for his recurring collaborations with Kamal Haasan including Nayakan (1987), Apoorva Sagodharagal (1989), Michael Madana Kama Rajan (1990), Avvai Shanmugi (1996) and Thenali (2001). He played as an ideal foil to Kamal Haasan in most of his films by emotionally connecting with the audience through his mannerism, screen presence, body language, and effective use of words in dialogue delivery. The on-screen chemistry between Ganesh and Kamal Haasan during their collaborations had been widely appreciated by critics due to their ability to elevate the crunch moments in films with their natural acting abilities by incorporating the situation aptly.

In Mani Ratnam's directorial, Nayakan (1987), he brought the range of acting skills to a different dimension where he featured as a Brahmin Iyer and played the right hand of Velu Nayakkar by serving as Velu Nayakkar's ardent follower and as a loyal sidekick, following Velu Nayakkar's footsteps with an attitude of gratitude, showing strong admiration towards Velu Nayakkar's conduct, even at the lowest ebb of Velu Nayakkar's life when his daughter left him due to his stance on honesty, a policy that even took the life of his elder son. His screen presence was given paramount importance in Nayakan as his role was designed in a way to support Velu Nayakkar's transition from a slum dweller to an underworld don. He reprised his role of helping a smuggler's transition to an underworld gangster from Nayakan in Gautham Vasudev Menon's directorial venture Vendhu Thanindhathu Kaadu (2022), making a cameo appearance. His most popular roles were as a supporting actor or a comedian, but he also played villainous roles in films such as Apoorva Sagodharargal (1989). His menacing villainous role in Apoorva Sagodharargal as Francis Anbarasu became talk of the town indicating the versatility in Delhi Ganesh's range of acting skills. Appu eventually used a Rube Goldberg Machine to kill Francis Anbarasu in Apoorva Sagodharargal and the sequence became widely popular upon the release of Apoorva Sagodharargal, which was later parodied in C. S. Amudhan's directorial venture Tamizh Padam (2010), with Delhi Ganesh himself went onto reprise his role.

In Singeetam Srinivasa Rao's directorial, Michael Madana Kama Rajan (1990), he played the character of a Palakkad-based cook and his humorous role received acclaim while his dialogue delivery with a Malayalam accent mixing with Tamil was also applauded. Dehi Ganesh gave credit to Crazy Mohan for writing the screenplay, which fetched the former's role an equal importance similar to the roles allocated to other cast members in Michael Madana Kama Rajan. In K. S. Ravikumar's directorial, Avvai Shanmugi (1996), he played the role of Sethurama Iyer, where he was also seen as Gemini Ganesan's secretary. He also had separate combination scenes with notable screen time and screen presence featuring alongside ensemble cast of including Kamal Haasan, Meena, Gemini Ganesan, Nassar, Nagesh and Manivannan in Avvai Shanmugi.

He won the Tamil Nadu State Film Award Special Prize for his performance in Pasi (1979). He also received various state awards like Kalaimamani (1994) given by the then Chief Minister J. Jayalalithaa. His other notable films included Sindhu Bhairavi (1985), Sri Raghavendrar (1985), Chatriyan (1990), Iruvar (1997), Aahaa..! (1997), Priyamaanavale (2000), Saamy (2003) and Kaavalan (2011). In K. Balachander's directorial, Sindhu Bhairavi (1985), he played the role as Gurumoorthy, a mridangam player. His performance as a mridangam player gained spotlight and his acting skills showing his emotional depth to elevate the circumstances of having been left out by mridangam band for his addiction to alcoholic consumption was also acclaimed by critics.

Ganesh was roped in as a cast member on the recommendation of Vijay for the film Thamizhan (2002) as the filmmakers and production crew were awaiting for a replacement to shoot a comedy track sequence. The on-screen pairing of Vijay and Delhi Ganesh gave the film Thamizhan a huge boost and their chemistry worked out in the comedy sequences. Ganesh's phrases "Cigaretta Niruthu, Enakku Discipline Thaan Mukkiyam" during his verbal arguments with Vijay in the comedy track sequences of Thamizhan became viral among fans.

It was revealed that he stopped acting in negative villainous roles after receiving harsh criticism from family audience for his negative role in television soap opera Chellamay which had Radhika Sarathkumar playing the main female lead. He also took notes from Cho Ramaswamy's article which published about why Delhi Ganesh was interested in taking up shady negative roles. He changed his mind and accepted negative role in Payasam which was a part of the anthology series Navarasa where he played the role of an envious old man being dejected with life experiences.

He also made an appearance in the short film What if Batman was from Chennai as a version of Alfred Pennyworth. In 2016, he had a brief role as the man who lodges complaint about his missing son, only later to find out that his son is dead in Dhuruvangal Pathinaaru under Karthick Naren's direction alongside Rahman. In 2015, he launched his first production venture, Ennul Aayiram (2016) which starred his son Maha in the leading role.

In 2021, Delhi Ganesh in an exclusive interview with The New Indian Express, insisted that he received acclaim and fame due to his frequent collaborations with Kamal Haasan. Ganesh was convinced by Kamal Haasan to play a fully fledged comic role, and as a result, Ganesh, based on Kamal's advice, performed as a comedian in Avvai Shanmugi.

In December 2023, he was conferred with the Gowri Manohari Award for his contributions to theatre and was honored at the 36th Winter Music Festival hosted by Sruthilaya Kendra, a trust founded by mridangam artist Karaikudi Mani. Delhi Ganesh also appeared in television soap operas and short films. His final appearance was in Indian 2 (2024).

== Death ==
Ganesh died in Chennai on 9 November 2024, at the age of 80.

== Filmography ==
=== Tamil films ===
List of Tamil-language film credits
Year	Title	Role	Notes	Ref.
1976	Pattina Pravesam			
1978	Kudisai	Parthasarathy		
1978	Oru Veedu Oru Ulagam			
1979	Velli Ratham			
1979	Aadu Pambe			
1979	Adisaya Raagam			
1979	Urangatha Kangal			
1979	Pasi	Muniyandi		
1980	Polladhavan	Moorthy		
1981	Engamma Maharani			
1981	Rajangam			
1981	Anbulla Athan			
1981	Andru Muthal Indru Varai			
1981	Pattam Padhavi			
1981	Raja Paarvai	Nancy's brother		
1982	Simla Special	Sundaram		
1982	Pudukavithai	Ganesh		
1982	Iniyavale Vaa			
1982	Nijangal			
1982	Enkeyo Ketta Kural	Vishwanathan		
1982	Moondru Mugam	Seeni		
1982	Mul Illatha Roja			
1982	Paritchaikku Neramaachu	Psychiatrist		
1982	Nadodi Raja			
1983	Sivappu Sooriyan	Vishwanathan		
1983	Dowry Kalyanam	Kuselan		
1983	Sandhippu	Muthayya		
1983	Anal Kaatru			
1983	Surappuli			
1983	Naalu Perukku Nandri			
1984	Oorukku Upadesam	Pulavar Ponnambalam		
1984	Achamillai Achamillai	Brahmanayagam		
1984	Komberi Mookan			
1984	Thenkoodu			
1984	Hemavin Kathalargal			
1985	Paadum Vaanampadi	Raja		
1985	Navagraha Nayagi			
1985	Kalyana Agathigal	Ammulu's father		
1985	Kadivalam			
1985	Ilam Kandru			
1985	Samayapurathale Satchi			
1985	Anni			
1985	Sri Raghavendrar	Appanacharya		
1985	Yaar?	Manickam		
1985	Ketti Melam	Periya Sethupathi		
1985	Sindhu Bhairavi	Gurumoorthy		
1985	Chidambara Rahasiyam	Masilamani / Black cat		
1985	Porutham	Janaki's husband		
1986	Adutha Veedu	Ganesh		
1986	Mr. Bharath	Ramkumar		
1986	Samsaram Adhu Minsaram	Vasantha's father		
1986	Manithanin Marupakkam			
1986	Puthir			
1986	Sonnathu Neethaanaa			
1986	Dharma Devathai	Paramasivan		
1986	Punnagai Mannan	Sethu's father		
1987	Kadhal Parisu	Inspector		
1987	Kizhakku Africavil Sheela	Accountant		
1987	Poovizhi Vasalile	Dr.Venkatram		
1987	Solvathellam Unmai	Raghavan		
1987	Velundu Vinaiyillai			
1987	Kavalan Avan Kovalan	Himself		
1987	Kani Nilam			
1987	Paruva Ragam	Shashi's father		
1987	Velaikkaran			
1987	Kadamai Kanniyam Kattupaadu			
1987	Jallikattu			
1987	Manithan	Marimuthu		
1987	Nayakan	Iyer		
1987	Mupperum Deviyar			
1987	Ore Oru Gramathiley			
1988	Veedu Manaivi Makkal			
1988	Sathyaa	Ramanathan		
1988	Makkal Aanaiyittal	Perumal Samy		
1988	Penmani Aval Kanmani	Kamala's husband		
1988	Ithuthan Arambam			
1988	Paasa Paravaigal	Public Prosecutor		
1988	Katha Nayagan	Inspector of police		
1988	Thai Paasam			
1988	Neruppu Nila			
1988	Mappillai Sir			
1988	Unnal Mudiyum Thambi	Arasiyalvathi		
1988	Raththa Dhanam			
1988	Kalicharan	DIG		
1988	Uzhaithu Vaazha Vendum	Subbaiah		
1989	Apoorva Sagodharargal	Francis Anbarasu		
1989	Siva			
1989	Rasathi Kalyanam			
1989	Chinnappadass			
1989	Dharma Devan			
1989	Padicha Pulla			
1989	Thaaya Thaarama			
1989	Sakalakala Sammanthi	Dharmakartha		
1989	Dharmam Vellum	Robert		
1989	Meenakshi Thiruvilayadal			
1989	Thalaippu Seithigal			
1990	Nalla Kaalam Porandaachu	Uma's father		
1990	Arangetra Velai	Police Officer		
1990	En Veedu En Kanavar			
1990	Seetha	Nakkeeran		
1990	Puriyaadha Pudhir	ASP		
1990	Chatriyan	Jaya's father		
1990	Michael Madhana Kamarajan	Palakkad Mani Iyer		
1990	Pudhu Pudhu Ragangal			
1990	Uchi Veyil	Sabhapathy		
1990	Thangaikku Oru Thalattu	Arun		
1990	Ethir Kaatru	Sundaramoorthy		
1991	Sigaram	Sachidhanandam		
1991	Theechatti Govindan			
1991	Mookuthi Poomelay			
1991	Idhaya Oonjal			
1991	Idhaya Vaasal			
1991	Vigneshwar	Vidhyasagar		
1991	Archana IAS	Dinesh's father		
1991	Vaidehi Kalyanam	Chinnasamy		
1991	Nee Pathi Naan Pathi	Ramasamy's wife		
1991	Nattukku Oru Nallavan	Doctor		
1991	En Pottukku Sonthakkaran			
1991	Rudhra	DCP Sundararajan		
1991	Jaitra Yatra			
1991	Annan Kattiya Vazhi			
1992	Periya Gounder Ponnu	Periya Saamy		
1992	Sivantha Malar			
1992	Oor Mariyadhai	Veerapandi's uncle		
1992	Mappillai Vandhachu			
1992	Chinna Marumagal			
1992	Amma Vanthachu	Nandini's father		
1992	Yermunai			
1992	Kalikaalam			
1992	Pattathu Raani	Ganesan		
1992	Pangali			
1992	Pandian	Public Prosecutor		
1992	Thirumathi Palanisamy	Palanisamy's father		
1992	Meera			
1993	Jathi Malli	Vaidyanathan		
1993	Aadhityan	Vedachellam		
1993	En Idhaya Rani			
1993	Muthu Pandi			
1994	Sethupathi IPS	Kesavan		
1994	Aranmanai Kaavalan	Police inspector		
1994	Vandicholai Chinnarasu	Rathnasamy		
1994	Vaa Magale Vaa	Mahadeva Iyer		
1994	Priyanka	Krishnan		
1994	Watchman Vadivel			
1994	Ungal Anbu Thangachi			
1994	Muthal Payanam			
1994	Pattukottai Periyappa	Pitchumani's father		
1994	Nammavar	Muthukumaraswamy Pillai		
1994	Gamanam	Keshavan Nair		
1994	Pudhiya Mannargal	Vidhya's father		
1995	Veluchamy	Maruthu		
1995	Mudhal Udhayam			
1995	Aanazhagan			
1995	Kizhakku Malai			
1995	Chinna Vathiyar	Aravind's father		
1995	Avatharam	Paandi		
1995	Witness	Doctor		
1995	Gandhi Pirantha Mann	Iyer		
1995	Aval Potta Kolam			
1995	Kolangal	Raghunatha Sethupathi		
1995	Dear Son Maruthu	Veeraiah		
1996	Kizhakku Mugam			
1996	Vaazhga Jananayagam			
1996	Sengottai	Neelakanda		
1996	Vetri Vinayagar	Prohit		
1996	Avvai Shanmughi	Sethurama Iyer		
1996	Mr. Romeo	Madras		
1997	Iruvar	Nambi		
1997	Dharma Chakkaram	Vijayalakshmi's father		
1997	Kaalamellam Kaathiruppen	Manimegalai's father		
1997	Aravindhan			
1997	My India			
1997	Pagaivan	Prabhu's father		
1997	Porkkaalam	Subbaiya		
1997	Aahaa..!	AGS.Ganesan		
1998	Moovendhar	Vaidehi's father		
1998	Ponmanam	Poornima's father		
1998	Kondattam	Raja's servant		
1998	Thulli Thirintha Kaalam	Dhamu's father		
1998	Kadhala Kadhala	Landlord		
1998	Harichandra	Harichandra's father		
1998	En Aasai Rasave			
1998	Pudhumai Pithan	Viswanath		
1999	Thodarum	S. Vinayagam		
1999	Nilave Mugam Kaattu	Kasthuri's father		
1999	Sangamam	Abhirami's uncle		
1999	Kanave Kalaiyadhe	Saradha's father		
1999	Poovellam Kettuppar	Ramanathan		
1999	Anbulla Kadhalukku	Shanti		
1999	Iraniyan	Ponni's father		
1999	Manam Virumbuthe Unnai			
2000	Hey Ram	Chari		
2000	Sabhash	Shanti's father		
2000	Unnai Kann Theduthey			
2000	Thenali	Panchabhootham		
2000	Priyamaanavale	Marudhu		
2001	Rishi	Indu's father		
2001	Sri Raja Rajeshwari	Rajeswari's father		
2001	Krishna Krishna			
2001	Lovely	Mahadevan's father		
2001	Aanandham	Gangadharan		
2001	Mitta Miraasu			
2001	Thavasi	Kanakku Pillai		
2001	Azhagana Naatkal	Somasundaram		
2002	Unnai Ninaithu	Surya's Lodge owner		
2002	Kamarasu	Advocate		
2002	Thamizhan	Advocate Lakshmi Narayanan		
2002	Thamizh	Meenakshi's father		
2002	Junior Senior			
2002	Pesadha Kannum Pesume			
2002	Baba	Perusu		
2002	Naina	Sambu		
2002	Sundhara Travels	Krishnan Pillai		
2002	Maaran	Ganesan		
2003	Ramachandra	Ramachandran's father		
2003	Julie Ganapathy	Inspector Ganesh		
2003	Kadhal Sadugudu			
2003	Dum	Chokkalingam		
2003	Arasu	Venu Shastri		
2003	Saamy	Srinivasan Iyengar		
2003	Vani Mahal			
2003	Nala Damayanthi	Ramji's uncle		
2003	Aalukkoru Aasai	Eshwari's father		
2003	Jay Jay	Jagan's father		
2004	Udhaya	Lawyer		
2004	Aethiree	Nataraja Iyer		
2004	Jana	Saminathan		
2004	Azhagesan	Govinda		
2004	Arasatchi	Sivaraman		
2004	Vishwa Thulasi	Pattabhi		
2005	London	Ganeshan		
2005	Amudhey	Dinakar's father		
2005	Neeye Nijam	Priya's grandfather		
2005	Kalaiyatha Ninaivugal			
2005	Aanai			
2005	Manthiran	House owner		
2005	Aaru	Poongavanam		
2006	Chithiram Pesuthadi	Prakash		
2006	Kovai Brothers	Kesavan		
2006	Mercury Pookkal			
2006	Suyetchai MLA			
2006	Thalai Nagaram	Corrupt Minister		
2006	Thalaimagan			
2007	Pori	Pooja's father		
2007	Muni	Priya's father		
2007	Sabari	Sabarivasan's father		
2007	Maamadurai			
2007	Cheena Thaana 001	Head Constable Ezhumalai		
2008	Arai En 305-il Kadavul	Krishnamoorthy		
2008	Poi Solla Porom	Principal		
2008	Thenavattu	Gayatri's father		
2009	Ayan	Narcotics Officer		
2009	Naal Natchathiram	Advocate		
2009	Maasilamani	Thalisdar Ramanathan		
2009	Unnai Kann Theduthe	Shiva Sankaran		
2009	Vaamanan	Minister Viduthalai		
2009	Pudhiya Payanam	Doctor Ramana		
2009	Vettaikaran	Ravi's father		
2010	Tamizh Padam	"Heroin" Kumar		
2010	Kutti Pisasu	Priya's grandpa		
2010	Irumbukkottai Murattu Singam	Paandu Paramu		
2010	Kola Kolaya Mundhirika	Ganesan		
2010	Pournami Nagam	Priest		
2010	Drogam: Nadanthathu Enna?			
2010	Ambasamudram Ambani	Dhandapani's first house owner		
2011	Kaavalan	Bhoomi's maternal uncle		
2011	Ilaignan	Karky's uncle		
2011	Ponnar Sankar			
2011	Bhavani	Bhavani's father		
2011	Sabash Sariyana Potti	Subbu		
2011	Unakkaga En Kadhal	Seenu		
2011	Kasethan Kadavulada			
2011	Aayiram Vilakku			
2011	Gurusamy	Gurusamy a.k.a. Ayyappan		
2012	Saguni	Lawyer		
2012	Kadhalar Kadhai			
2012	Sri Ramakrishna Darshanam			
2012	Thaandavam	Meenakshi's father		
2012	Pudhumugangal Thevai			
2013	Puthagam	Bank officer		
2013	Naanum En Jamunavum			
2013	Thirumathi Thamizh			
2013	Theeya Velai Seiyyanum Kumaru	Bombay Ganesan		
2013	Kedi Billa Killadi Ranga	Chidambaram		
2013	Naan Rajavaga Pogiren	Kamaraj's assistant		
2013	Sibi			
2013	Thuttu			
2013	Kadhai Kelu			
2013	Kamban Kazhagam			
2013	Ragalaipuram	Constable Pandian		
2013	Kalyana Samayal Saadham	Chandrasekaran		
2014	Oru Kanniyum Moonu Kalavaanikalum			
2014	Jigarthanda	Subramani		
2014	Ramanujan			
2014	Hogenakkal			
2014	Poriyaalan	College Principal		
2014	13 Am Pakkam Parkka			
2015	Killadi	Dharani's father		
2015	Sandamarutham	Surya's father		
2015	36 Vayadhinile	Vasanthi's father-in-law		
2015	Papanasam	Vijayakumar		
2015	Viraivil Isai	tea stall owner		
2015	Apoorva Mahaan			
2015	Kopperundevi			
2015	Pasanga 2			
2016	Angali Pangali			
2016	Chandi Kuthirai			
2016	Mudinja Ivana Pudi	Orphanage Owner		
2016	Nambiar	Saroja Devi's father		
2016	Merku Mogappair Kanaka Durga			
2016	Thirumaal Perumai			
2016	Virumandikkum Sivanandikkum			
2016	Manal Kayiru 2	Doctor		
2016	Ner Mugam			
2016	Dhuruvangal Pathinaaru	Sriram		
2016	Oru Tharam Udhayamagirathu			
2017	Azhagana En Charupriya			
2017	Oru Mugathirai			
2017	Kaatru Veliyidai	Col. Mithran		
2017	Vilayada Vaa			
2017	Mangalapuram			
2017	Inayathalam	Panjabikesan		
2017	Yevanavan			
2017	Yaar Ivan			
2017	Mecheri Vana Bhadrakali			
2017	12-12-1950			
2018	Irumbu Thirai	Rangarajan		
2018	Enna Thavam Seitheno			
2018	Brahmaputra			
2018	Junga	Sukumar		
2018	Ghajinikanth	Rajini's grandfather		
2018	Oh Kaadhalaney			
2018	Saamy 2	Srinivasan		
2019	Goko Mako	Delhi Ganesh		
2019	Agni Devi	Constable		
2019	Kanchana 3	Raghava's grandfather		
2019	Perazhagi ISO			
2019	Vedhamanavan			
2019	Nerkonda Paarvai	Krishnan		
2020	En Sangathu Aala Adichavan Evanada			
2020	Indha Nilai Maarum	Justice Narayanan		
2020	Konala Irunthalum Ennodadhu			
2021	Calls	Karunakaran		
2021	Appathava Aattaya Pottutanga	Suthanthiram		
2022	Enna Solla Pogirai	Preethi's grandfather		
2022	Narai Ezhuthum Suyasaritham	Vaidyanathan		
2022	Vendhu Thanindhathu Kaadu	Iyer		
2023	Jambu Maharishi			
2023	Unnaal Ennaal			
2023	Echo			
2023	Vaan Moondru	Sivan		
2023	Karumegangal Kalaigindrana	Badri		
2023	Shot Boot Three			
2024	Rathnam	Neelakandan		
2024	Aranmanai 4	Zamindar		
2024	Indian 2	Krishna Mohan		
2025	Aghathiyaa	Astrologer	Posthumous releases	
2025	Konjam Kadhal Konjam Modhal	Maha's husband	Posthumous releases	
2025	Yaman Kattalai		Posthumous releases	
2025	Guts		Posthumous releases	
2025	Maayakoothu	Editor	Posthumous releases	
2025	Yellow		Posthumous releases	
2025	Galatta Family	Judge	Posthumous releases	

=== Malayalam films ===
List of Malayalam-language film credits
Year	Title	Role	Ref.
1993	Dhruvam	Ramayyan	
1993	Devaasuram	Panicker	
1994	The City	Commissioner Muthulingam IPS	
1996	Kaalapani	Pandiyan	
2005	Kochi Rajavu	Madhavan	
2006	Keerthi Chakra	Jai's father	
2010	Pokkiri Raja	Velu	
2014	Peruchazhi	Tamil Nadu delegate	
2015	Lavender	Isha's grandfather	
2019	Manoharam	Ali Bhai	

=== Telugu films ===
List of Telugu-language film credits
Year	Title	Role	Notes	Ref.
1991	Jaitra Yatra			
1997	Ratra Yatra	Veerabhadraya		
2006	Naayudamma			
2009	Punnami Naagu	Priest		
2017	Veedevadu	Panthulu		
2025	Legally Veer	Veer's father	Posthumous appearance	

=== Hindi films ===
List of Hindi-language film credits
Year	Title	Role	Notes	Ref.
1999	Dubashi	Family doctor		
2005	Dus	Suryakant Raidu		
2009	Ajab Prem Ki Ghazab Kahani	Temple priest		
2013	Chennai Express	Villager		

=== Short films / videos ===
List of short film / video credits
Year	Title	Role	Language	Ref.
2011	Help	Airport security officer	English	
2015	What If Batman Was From Chennai?	Alfred / Anantha Padmanabhan	English; Tamil	
2017	App(a) Lock	Nikita's father	Tamil	
2018	The Boy		Tamil	
2020	Mamanukku Mariyathai		Tamil	
2024	Kaalam Pona Kaalathula		Tamil	
2025	Baby	Balachander	Tamil	

=== Dubbing artist ===
List of film dubbing credits
Title	Actor	Language
Mazhalai Pattalam	Vishnuvardhan	Tamil
47 Natkal	Chiranjeevi	Tamil
Kudumbam Oru Kadambam	Prathap Pothen	Tamil
Thanga Magan	Raveendran	Tamil
Kaadhal Devathai	Chiranjeevi	Tamil (dubbed version)
Devaraagam	Nedumudi Venu	Tamil (dubbed version)
Veeran	Lokesh	Tamil (dubbed version)

== Television ==
=== Serials ===
List of television serials credits
Year	Serial	Channel	Notes	Citations
	Ippadikku Thendral			
	Manithargal			
	Velai			
	Dinesh Ganesh			
1990	Kottaipurathu Veedu	Doordarshan		
1996–1997	Ragasiyam	Sun TV		
1998	Chellamma	Sun TV	Also director	
1999–2000	Sorna Reghai	Sun TV		
2000	Costly Mapillai	Sun TV		
2000	Micro Thodargal-Plastic Vizhuthugal	Raj TV		
2002–2003	Nambikkai	Sun TV		
2002–2003	Janani	Sun TV		
2002–2003	Veettuku Veedu Lootty	Jaya TV		
2002–2004	Mugangal	Sun TV		
2002–2003	Sigaram	Sun TV		
2003–2005	Sorgam	Sun TV		
2003	Kumkumam	Sun TV		
2004–2006	Manaivi	Sun TV		
2004–2006	Kalki	Jaya TV		
2006	Penn	Sun TV		
2006–2007	Vaadagai Veedu	Kalaignar TV		
2006–2012	Kasthuri	Sun TV		
2007–2008	Pallankuzhi	Doordarshan		
2007–2008	Porantha Veeda Pugantha Veeda	Sun TV		
2007–2009	Vasantham	Sun TV		
2008	Thirupaavai	Sun TV		
2008–2009	Deepangal	Kalaignar TV		
2009–2012	Chellamay	Sun TV		
2009–2010	Enge Brahmanan	Jaya TV		
2010–2011	En Peyar Meenakshi	Vijay TV		
2012	Aaha	Vijay TV		
2013–2014	Then Nilavu	Sun TV		
2013–2015	Devathai	Sun TV		
2013–2015	Sondha Bandham	Sun TV		
2014	Bhairavi Aavigalukku Priyamanaval			
2018–2019	Lakshmi Stores	Sun TV	Bilingual Series	
2019	Lakshmi Stores	Gemini TV		
2021	Thalattu	Sun TV		
2022–2023	Maari	Zee Tamil		
2022–2023	Ilakkiya	Sun TV		
2025	Aadukalam	Sun TV		

=== Web series ===
List of television web series credits
Year	Program	Network
2018	America Mappillai	ZEE5
2021	Navarasa	Netflix
2025	Nadu Center	Jio Hotstar

=== Dubbing artist ===
List of television dubbing credits
Year	Title	Actor	Network
1987	Malgudi Days	Girish Karnad	Doordarshan

== Accolades ==
- 1980 Tamil Nadu State Film Award Special Prize Best Actor - Pasi
- 1994 kalaimamani
