= Ninaivil Nindraval (1967 film) =

1967 film by Muktha Srinivasan

- Poster
- Directed by: Muktha Srinivasan
- Screenplay by: Cho
- Story by: Rajasri
- Produced by: V. Ramasamy
- Starring: Ravichandran; K. R. Vijaya
- Cinematography: T. N. Sundarababu
- Edited by: L. Balu
- Music by: V. Kumar
- Production company: Muktha Films
- Distributed by: Balaji
- Release date: 1 September 1967
- Running time: 175 minutes
- Country: India
- Language: Tamil

Ninaivil Nindraval (transl. She Remembered) is a 1967 Indian Tamil-language romantic comedy film directed by Muktha Srinivasan. The film stars Ravichandran and K. R. Vijaya, with Nagesh, Cho, V. S. Raghavan, Anandan, Kumari Sachu, Manorama and Devaki in supporting roles. It revolves around a woman who, following her marriage, suffers amnesia, forgetting the events of her marriage.

The screenplay of Ninaivil Nindraval was written by Cho from a story by Rajasri. The film was produced by V. Ramasamy, photographed by T. N. Sundarababu and edited by L. Balu, with the music composed by V. Kumar. It was released on 1 September 1967, and emerged a success.

== Plot ==
Prema stays at her paternal uncle Doctor Sammandham's house in Bangalore for her higher studies. Prema has a bike accident and suffers from amnesia. Then she wanders and reach Chennai by train, where she meets an unemployed young man Prakash, and his friend Balu, protects her. Prema and Prakash fall in love and get married. She is then in another accident and loses the memories of her marriage. Prema's father Umapathi engages his General Manager Mohan. Balu moves to Trichy for his job, where he meets Prema and sends a message for his friend Prakash. Prakash reaches Trichy and tries to prove Prema is his wife, but fails. Finally, Prema falls down the steps and recollects all her memories, her identity and her husband. Balu and his lover Meera get married.

== Cast ==
Male cast

- Ravichandran as Prakash
- Nagesh as Balu
- Cho as Doctor Sammandham
- V. S. Raghavan as Umapathi
- Anandan as Mohan

Female cast

- K. R. Vijaya as Prema/Radha
- Kumari Sachu as Meera
- Manorama as Sarala
- Devaki as Typist Kala

== Soundtrack ==
Music was by V. Kumar.

Song	Singer	Lyrics	Length
"Enna Theriyum Entha Chinna"	P. Susheela	Vaali	03:27
"Thambi Vaadaa Adichathu Yogam"	T. M. Soundararajan, P. Susheela, Tharapuram Sundararajan	Vaali	03:51
"Thottatha Thodathathaa"	T. M. Soundararajan, P. Susheela	Vaali	03:42
"Paravaigal Siraginaal Anaikka"	L. R. Eswari	Vaali	03:35
"Nandhan Vandhan Kovililae"	S. Sarala	C. N. Muthu	03:30

== Release and reception ==
Ninaivil Nindraval was released on 1 September 1967, and distributed by Balaji. Kalki said all the film's flaws were compensated by its comedy. Though the film did not run for over 100 days in theatres, it was still a success.

== Bibliography ==
- Cowie, Peter; Elley, Derek, eds. (1977). World Filmography: 1967. Tantivy Press. ISBN 0-498-01565-3.
