= Polladhavan (1980 film) =

1980 film by Muktha Srinivasan

- Theatrical release poster
- Directed by: Muktha Srinivasan
- Screenplay by: Muktha Srinivasan
- Dialogue by: Thooyavan
- Story by: Salim–Javed
- Produced by: S. Ravi
- Starring: Rajinikanth; Lakshmi; Sripriya
- Cinematography: M. Karnan
- Edited by: V. P. Krishnan
- Music by: M. S. Viswanathan
- Production company: Vidhya Movies
- Release date: 6 November 1980
- Running time: 135 minutes
- Country: India
- Language: Tamil

Polladhavan (/poʊllɑːðəvən/ transl. The Ruthless Man) is a 1980 Indian Tamil-language action thriller film produced by S. Ravi, directed and co-written by his father Muktha Srinivasan. A remake of the 1976 Kannada film Premada Kanike, it stars Rajinikanth, Lakshmi and Sripriya. The film revolves around a wealthy estate merchant who keeps his daughter's nanny captive in his house as she witnessed a murder committed by him.

Rajinikanth initially wanted to star in a Tamil remake of the Hindi film Vishwanath (1978), but as Ravi did not like the film, they decided to collaborate on a different project, eventually choosing to remake Premada Kanike. The film was shot mainly in Bangalore, with additional shooting taking place in Madras, Shimla and Kashmir. It was photographed by M. Karnan and edited V. P. Krishnan, with music by M. S. Viswanathan.

Polladhavan was released on 6 November 1980, Diwali. The film became a commercial success, and was one of many films which helped Rajinikanth to carve out a niche for himself in vendetta roles.

== Plot ==
Seetha, a young woman, is travelling via train with her nephew Raju to an estate to attend her job interview as a nanny to the estate merchant Manohar's daughter. Her co-passenger tries to rape her, but suddenly he is shot dead. Seetha sees the murderer's face, and later reports the murder to Moorthy, a police inspector. Once she is appointed for the nanny position, she and Manohar's daughter Shoba grow fond of each other.

Manohar, who is extremely fond of his daughter, returns from his journey. Seetha meets him, only to realise that he is the murderer she saw on the train. Manohar threatens Seetha not to tell anyone and makes sure to prevent her from leaving his estate as she is keen on reporting him to the police.

Seetha tries many times to escape but is always caught. She does not even tell the police when she meets them, as Manohar threatens to kill Raju if she did. Later, Seetha somehow sees beneath the rough, mean Manohar and grows fond of him but is confused why such a nice man is acting so arrogantly.

In flashbacks, Manohar and a woman named Kumudha fell in love and married; shortly thereafter, their daughter, Shoba, was born. However, Kumudha's uncle Chandru, who was eager to marry Kumudha but who was sent to jail by Manohar as he tried to kill him, was released from jail after completing his term. When Manohar was out of the house, Chandru raped Kumudha; due to this, she commits suicide, and Manohar wants to die with her, but she makes him vow that he will get revenge on Chandru for separating them and to take care of Shoba.

Manohar reveals that the man he killed on the train was Chandru. Seetha now understands his acts and vows not to tell anyone. Moorthy's colleague is curious about Seetha; she said that she remembered the face and was eager to find the murderer, but now she had told him she has forgotten the face, hence he suspects Seetha to be the murderer, and Moorthy agrees with his belief. On Shoba's birthday, Manohar is to announce that he is to hand over all his wealth to Seetha and surrender to the police, but before this, the police arrive and try to arrest Seetha. Manohar saves her by confessing to the murder, leading to his arrest. A few years later, Manohar is released and reunites with Seetha and Shoba.

== Cast ==
- Rajinikanth as Manohar
- Lakshmi as Seetha
- Sripriya as Kumudha
- Suruli Rajan as Manohar's manager
- Sivachandran as Chandru
- Delhi Ganesh as Moorthy
- V. Gopalakrishnan as a police officer
- Senthamarai as Ramaiya
- K. Natraj as Kumudha's brother
- Baby Anju as Manohar's daughter

== Production ==
Rajinikanth initially wanted to star in a Tamil remake of the Hindi film Vishwanath (1978), with S. Ravi producing. Ravi watched the film, but did not like it; Rajinikanth and Ravi then decided to remake a different film. K. Balaji gave Ravi a video cassette of the Kannada film Premada Kanike (1976), and told him to tell Rajinikanth to watch it. Rajinikanth told Ravi he had already watched the film multiple times and liked it, so it was decided to remake the film in Tamil. The remake was initially titled Erimalai (transl. Volcano) but retitled Polladhavan, at Rajinikanth's suggestion. It was directed by Ravi's father Muktha Srinivasan (who also wrote the screenplay) and produced by Ravi under Vidhya Movies. The film was made in CinemaScope. Cinematography was handled by M. Karnan, and editing by V. P. Krishna. The dialogues were written by Thooyavan. Srinivasan cast Delhi Ganesh after seeing his performance in the play Thuppariyum Saambu. Shooting for the film took place primarily at Bangalore, Mysore Palace and Lalitha Mahal with additional shooting taking place in Chennai, Shimla and Kashmir. The eyes shown in the beginning of the film were of Ceylon Vijayendran, doubling for Rajinikanth.

== Soundtrack ==
The soundtrack was composed by M. S. Viswanathan, with lyrics by Kannadasan. The song "Chinnakkannane" is set in the Hindustani raga known as Brindavani Sarang. The song "Adho Vaarandi" is set in Shivaranjani raga. The song "Naan Polladhavan" also briefly features in the 2023 Tamil film Leo.

Track listing
No.	Title	Singer(s)	Length
1.	"Naan Polladhavan"	S. P. Balasubrahmanyam	4:27
2.	"Chinnakkannane"	P. Susheela	4:32
3.	"Atho Vaarandi"	S. P. Balasubrahmanyam, Vani Jairam	4:36
4.	"Naanae Endrum Raja"	S. P. Balasubrahmanyam	4:41
Total length:			18:16

== Release and reception ==
Polladhavan was released on 6 November 1980, Diwali. Nalini Sastry of Kalki wrote that the director, by taking an ordinary story and transforming it, was himself a ruthless man. Naagai Dharuman of Anna praised the acting, cinematography, music, dialogues and direction. Despite facing competition from other Diwali releases such as Varumayin Niram Sivappu and Nizhalgal, the film was a commercial success, and cemented Rajinikanth's "hold over the box office". Rajinikanth also managed to carve out a niche for himself in vendetta roles such as that in Polladhavan. The film was, however, less successful in Malaysia. Rajinikanth's bearded appearance with sunglasses later served as an inspiration for his looks in Baashha (1995).

== Bibliography ==
- Mathrubootheswaran, S. S. (2007). Thannambikkai Tharugiradhu Rajinikanth Vaazhkkai Varalaru [The Life History of Rajinikanth- A Self Confidence Booster for All] (in Tamil). Bharathi Puthakalayam. OCLC 849818131.
- Ramachandran, Naman (2014) [2012]. Rajinikanth: The Definitive Biography. New Delhi: Penguin Books. ISBN 978-81-8475-796-5.
