= Bommalattam (1968 film) =

1968 film by Muktha Srinivasan

- Poster
- Directed by: Muktha Srinivasan
- Screenplay by: Cho Ramaswamy
- Story by: Madurai Thirumaran
- Produced by: V. Ramaswamy
- Starring: Jaishankar; Jayalalithaa
- Cinematography: T. M. Sundarababu B. A.
- Edited by: L. Balu
- Music by: V. Kumar
- Production company: Muktha Films
- Release date: 31 May 1968
- Running time: 165 minutes
- Country: India
- Language: Tamil

Bommalattam (transl. Puppet Show) is a 1968 Indian Tamil-language comedy film, directed by Muktha Srinivasan and produced by V. Ramaswamy. The screenplay was written by Cho Ramaswamy from a story by Madurai Thirumaran. It stars Jaishankar, Jayalalithaa, Nagesh, Major Sundarrajan, Cho Ramaswamy and Manorama. V. S. Raghavan, Sachu and O. A. K. Thevar play key roles. The film was released on 31 May 1968.

== Cast ==
- Jaishankar as Sukumar
- Jayalalithaa as Malathi
- Nagesh as Durai
- Manorama as Chinna Ponnu
- Cho Ramaswamy as Jaambazaar Jaggu
- Sachu as Geetha
- Vennira Aadai Moorthy as Sukumar's father
- Major Sundarrajan as Rathnam/Bal Raj
- V. S. Raghavan as Dr. Dhamodharan
- O. A. K. Thevar as Chithambaram
- K. K. Soundar as Rathnam's henchman

== Soundtrack ==
The film's music was composed by V. Kumar, with lyrics by Vaali, Alangudi Somu, Na. Pandurangan and Avinasi Mani. For the song "Vaa Vathiyare", Srinivasan wanted the usage of Madras Bashai, but Vaali felt it was hard for him, so M. L. Govind was hired to "provide the apt words to go with it", leading to the birth of lines like "Jambajar Jakku, Na Saidapetta Kokku" in the song. That also became Tamil cinema's first gaana song. "Vaa Vathiyare", written by Vaali and sung by Manorama, became popular, and in 1991 His Master's Voice released a compilation album under the same title, featuring songs by Manorama.

Song	Singer(s)	lyrics	Length
"Mayakkathai"	P. Susheela	Alangudi Somu	3:55
"Nee Aada Aada Azhagu"	T. M. Soundararajan	Vaali	3:20
"Nalla Naal Parkkavo"	T. M. Soundararajan, P. Susheela	Vaali	4:11
"Va Vathyare" (Jambajar Jakku)	Manorama	Vaali	3:51
"Poonai Kannai Kattinal"	Tharapuram Sundararajan & S. Sarala	Na.Pandurangan	3:10

== Reception ==
Kalki appreciated the animated opening titles, but criticised the film's title for lacking relevance to the story.
