= Kathadi Ramamurthy =

Indian comedian and actor

Kathadi S. Ramamurthy
- Born: 30 April 1938 (age 88); Kumbakonam, Tanjore District (now Thanjavur district), British India
- Occupations: Director, actor

Sundaresan Ramamurthy (born April 30, 1938), better known as Kathadi Ramamurthy, is an Indian actor, director, writer and dubbing artiste. He is primarily known for his roles as a comedian in Tamil cinema, theatre and television.

== Early life ==
Born in Kumbakonam, Ramamurthy studied at Madras and graduated from the Vivekananda College in 1958. Right from his college days, Ramamurthy had a love for drama. His plays were popular and he won many awards. Through his troupe, he gave first opportunities to many future legends including Cho Ramaswamy, Visu, Delhi Ganesh and Crazy Mohan among others. After playing a cartoonist named Kathadi in the Cho Ramaswamy play If I Get It, he became permanently known as Kathadi Ramamurthy.

== Filmography ==
=== Television ===
Year	Title	Role	Channel
1988	Panju Pattu Peethambaram		DD Podhigai
1990	Thuppariyum Sambu	Thuppariyum Sambu	Doordarshan
2003–2005	Adugiran Kannan		Sun TV
2006–2009	Bandham		Sun TV
2008–2010	Thirupavvai		Sun TV
2010	Ilavarasi		Sun TV
2010–2012	Anupallavi		Sun TV
2012–2015	Bommalattam	Badri	Sun TV
2012	Aaha		Star Vijay
2013–2014	Pillai Nila		Sun TV
2013–2015	Madipakkam Madhavan	Kulothungan	Kalaignar TV
2014–2015	Vaazhve Dhaayam		Doordarshan
2016	Chinna Papa Periya Papa		Sun TV
2018	Hello Shyamala		Raj TV
2019	Sathya		Zee Tamil
2020–2023	Pandavar Illam	Mandiramoorthy	Sun TV
2020	Vallamai Tharayo	Rangarajan	Vikatan Televistas
2021	Karma 2	Lakshmanan	Bombay Chanakya's FastFlix
2022–2023	Priyamaana Thozhi	Sundaram	Sun TV
2022	Karma 3	Lakshmanan	Bombay Chanakya's FastFlix youtube
2024	Mahakavi Bharathi	Swaminatha Deekshitar	DD Tamizh
2025–2026	Aadukalam	Maniyarasan	Sun TV

=== Films ===
This is a partial filmography. You can expand it.

Year	Film	Role	Note
1967	Penne Nee Vaazhga		
1968	Bommalattam		
1968	Ethir Neechal		
1969	Kanne Pappa		
1970	Raman Ethanai Ramanadi	Asst. director	
1970	Kalam Vellum		
1970	Maanavan	Ravi's friend	
1972	Pattikada Pattanama	Rickshaw man	
1972	Gnana Oli	Train passenger	
1973	Suryagandhi	Ulagesan	
1974	Naan Avanillai	Court Observer	
1975	Manidhanum Dheivamagalam	Gopal	
1975	Andharangam		
1976	Mogam Muppadhu Varusham	Shankaran	
1976	Paalooti Valartha Kili		
1977	Ilaya Thalaimurai	Hostel Watchman	
1977	Pattina Prevesam		
1977	Thani Kudithanam		
1978	Andaman Kadhali	Prabhu's secretary	
1979	Veettukku Veedu Vasappadi		
1981	Keezh Vaanam Sivakkum		
1982	Hitler Umanath		Guest appearance
1982	Simla Special	Gurbani	
1983	Iniyavale Vaa		
1983	Oru Odai Nadhiyagirathu		
1984	Raja Veettu Kannukkutty		
1988	Katha Nayagan	Bank Officer	
2013	Kalyana Samayal Saadham	Raghu's grandfather	
2019	50/50	Dhanalakshmi's grandfather	
2020	Putham Pudhu Kaalai	Mahendran	Segment Coffee, Anyone?
2021	Mathil		A ZEE5 original film
2021	Appathava Aattaya Pottutanga	Seenu	
2023	Let's Get Married	Meera's grandfather	
2024	Rocket Driver	Sasthri	
2025	Sweetheart!	Manu's neighbour	
2025	Aaromaley	Anjali's grandfather	
2026	Ram and Leela	Leela's grandfather	

=== Dubbing artist ===
Series	Actor	Notes
Didi's Comedy Show	Dieter Hallervorden	Dubbed for Tamil version for Jetix channel in 2007
