= Manorama (Tamil actress) =

Indian actress (1937–2015)

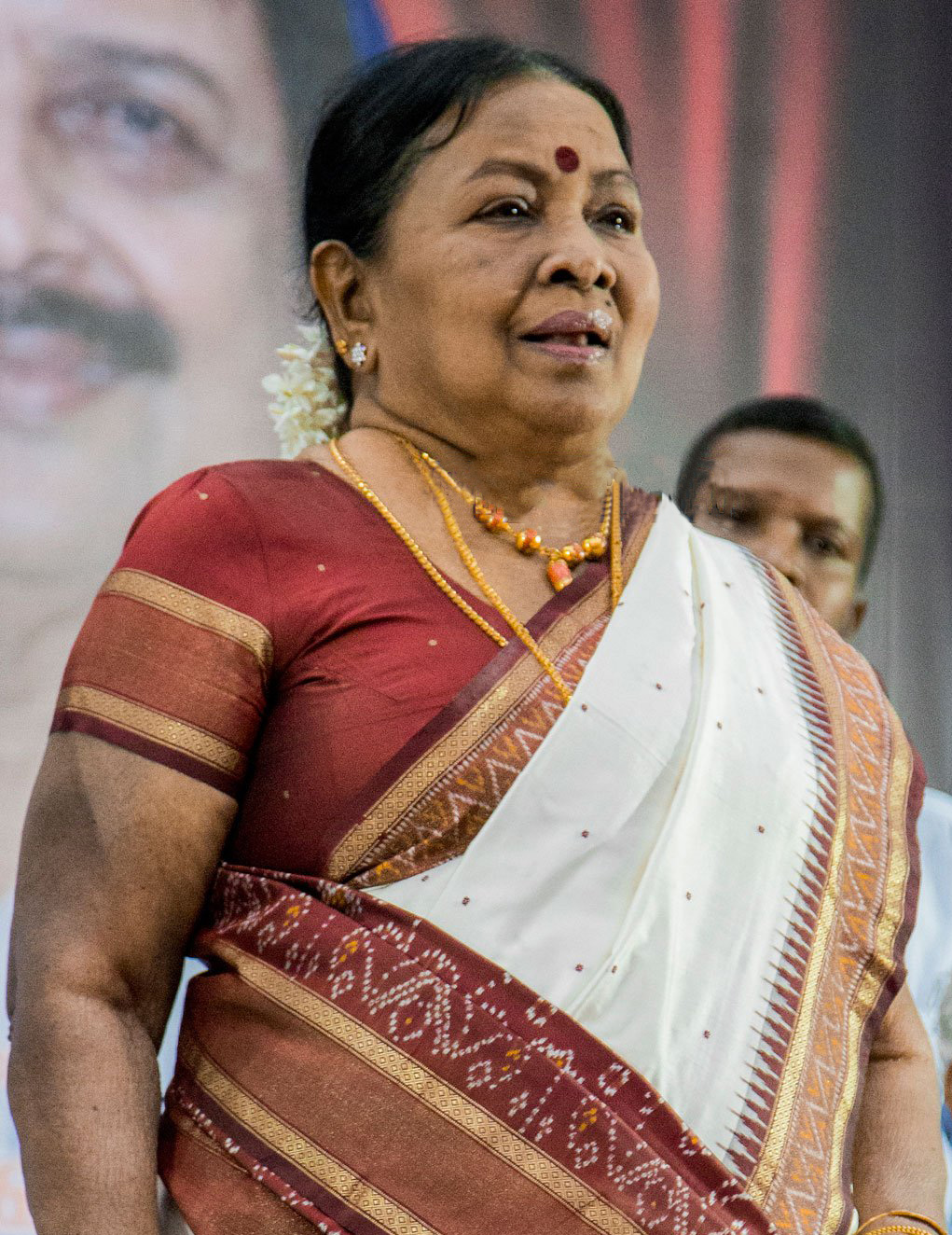
- Manorama at Cinema Journalist Association Event
- Born: Gopishantha; 26 May 1937; Mannargudi, Madras Presidency, British India (present-day Tamil Nadu, India) Now Thirukannamagai, Thiruvarur District, Tamil Nadu, India
- Died: 10 October 2015 (aged 78); Chennai, Tamil Nadu, India
- Other name: Aachi
- Years active: 1958–2015
- Works: Filmography
- Spouse: S. M. Ramanathan (m. 1954; div. 1956)
- Children: 1

Gopishantha (26 May 1937 – 10 October 2015), better known by her stage name Manorama, also called Aachi, was an Indian actress, comedian and playback singer who appeared in more than 1,500 films and 5,000 stage performances predominantly in Tamil cinema and also in Telugu, Kannada, Malayalam, and Sinhala films. She was honoured with Kalaimamani award in 1995. In 2002, Government of India awarded Manorama the Padma Shri for her contribution in the field of arts. She is a recipient of one National Film Award, one Filmfare Award South and seven Tamil Nadu State Film Awards.

== Early life ==
Manorama was born to Kasiyappan Kilakudaiyar and Ramamirtham in Mannargudi Thirukannamangai, a town in the former Thiruvarur district of Tamil Nadu in a Kallar (Thevar) family. Her mother brought her up working as a maid. She mentioned being indebted to her mother for her success: saying that many of the motherly roles that she has played in films resemble her own mother. Her family moved to Pallathur near Karaikudi due to poverty. While in Pallathur, her mother had started vomiting blood. To cover her mother's medical expenses, Manorama decided to start working as a maid and dropped out of school at the age of 11.

Once a drama troupe had come to Pallathur and one of the actresses who was to play a small part suddenly dropped out due to her inability to sing, so the troupe was looking for an artist who could act and sing as well. The troupe decided to cast Manorama as a replacement in the drama titled Andhaman Kadhali, thus starting her acting career at the age of twelve. During this time, she was rechristened Manorama by one of her drama directors Thiruvengadam and harmonist Thiayagarajan. Manorama went and met S.S. Rajendran (SSR) when he camped at her native district with his drama troupe. She was selected for a role in his ManiMagudam drama written by Kalaignar M Karunanidhi. She continued to act in plays and performed as a playback singer as well. After having success in the world of plays she was offered to work on a film, named Inbavazhvu, by Janakiraman, which remained mostly incomplete. Later on Kannadasan would offer her a lead role in another movie, Unmayinkottai, which was shelved after shooting less than half of it. She lost hope of becoming a film actor when both these films remained incomplete.

Manorama fell in love with her manager, S. M. Ramanathan and married him in 1954; the couple has a son named Bhoopathy born in 1955. However, they divorced in 1956 and started to live separately in Chennai. She would later state in an interview in 2015:

"My mom wanted me to study medicine. But it was not easy to become a doctor in those days, and I became an actress. So, if I hadn't taken up acting, I would have tried to become a doctor as my mom wished for it. But now, fortunately, my grandson is a doctor, and I am proud of it."

== Career ==
She acted in small roles in a few Vairam Nataka Sabha dramas. One time she went to see a drama of S. S. Rajendran, who was residing at Pudukkotai, in Tamil Nadu, and P.A. Kumar introduced her to Rajendran. She showed her skill in dialogue delivery and was offered a job in the S.S.R. Nataka Mandram company and played in hundreds of stage productions all over the district: The dramas included Manimagudam, Thenpandiveeran and Pudhuvellam. She credits her work in Manimagudam as where she was first recognized as an actress. She then took part in an unfinished film starring S. S. Rajendran and Devika.

She migrated from dramas to the silver screen with the role of a heroine in the 1958 Tamil film Malayitta Mangai: Kannadasan was the one to give her the lead role there. The first film in which she played as an heroine was Konjum Kumari. From there moving onto comedy in the 60s. In this period she would be given equally challenging roles alongside the well-known comedian Nagesh in 50 films.

When asked in an interview as to how she got into films, she quoted: "It's all because of Kannadasan. It was he who changed my life by casting me in the film Maalayitta Mangai in 1957. It was a comical role, and he trusted me so much and said that I will be able to pull it off. I was very doubtful about it, but he told me, "If you are going to act in films only as a heroine, people here will throw you out of the industry after three or four years, but doing such roles will take you places. And you have the talent, too, to reach higher peaks." That is when I got confidence and continued doing comedy roles."

The first time Manorama stood before the camera was for a Sinhalese film named Sukumali in 1957, in which she played a friend of the main hero. Her dance master Suryakala recommended her to the director Masthaan to play the role. She has acted predominantly in Tamil films since 1958, but also acted in Telugu, Hindi, Malayalam and Kannada movies as well. Her on-screen pair with Tangavelu was appreciated in the film Vallvanakku Vallavan. Her on-screen pair with Nagesh was very popular in the 60s, then with Cho in the 1970s and 80s and later with Thengai Srinivasan, Vennira Aadai Moorthy, and Surali Rajan in the 70s and 80s.

She had done playback singing for 300 songs, mostly centered on herself, in Tamil films. The first song that she sang was in a film called Magale Un Samathu, composed by G. K. Venkatesh and she got this opportunity due to the producer P.A. Kumar. She has sung a classical-based song with TM Sounderajan in the film Dharshinam (1970), where she was paired with Cho. Manorama would also perform with L.R. Eswari in a song named Thaatha thaatha pidi kudu. Her career's biggest hit songf was Vaa Vaathiyaare Uttaande composed by music director V. Kumar for the film ''Bommalattam", which was centered around her and Cho. She also sang for M. S. Viswanathan and A. R. Rahman.

Some of her best Tamil films include Anbe Vaa, Thenmazhi, Ethir Neechal, Galatta Kalyanam, Chittukuruvi, Durga Devi, Annalakshmi and Imayam. In Telugu, she starred in films such as Rikshavodu, Krishnarjuna and Subhodayam. When asked in an interview which were her most memorable roles, she replied:

"It is Nadigan, which had Sathyaraj and Khushbu in the lead. I cannot forget that role of Baby Amma in my life. Also my role in Chinna Gounder, for which I had to sport weird, artificial teeth, is something which I always think about.

Manorama was paired with Nagesh regularly in films with M.G. Ramachandran in the lead like: En Kadamai, Kanni Thai, Thayin Madiyil, Kadhal Vaganam, Chandrodhyam, Anbee Vaa, Padagotti, Kadhal Vagahnam, Vivasaaye, Thaikku Thalaimagan, Vettikaran and Ther Thiruvizha. Other directors cast the Nagesh-Manorama pair in films like Anubhavi Raja Anubhavi, Kungumam, Saraswathi Sabadham, Panjavarnakilli, Navarathiri, Puthiya Paravai, Patthu Matha Bandham, Anbu Karangal, Micheal Madan Kamarajan, Annamitta Kai, Gowri Kalyanam, Anbe Aaruyire, Server Sundaram, Ner Vazhai, Ninaivin Nindraval, Poojaikku Vandamalar, Deiva Thirumagal, Rakta Thilagam, Aannavin Asai, Thiruvarutchelvar, Seetha and Karunthel Kannayiram. Manorama, actress Sachu and Jayalalithaa have acted together in 2 films as a combination: Galata Kalyanam and Bommalattam. Manorama and Jayalalithaa have acted in 25 films together.

Her work was noticed even among stalwarts like Sivaji Ganesan and Natiya Peroli Padmini. Manorama shared in an interview that initially she was nervous acting in front of veterans like T. S. Balaiah, but the director A. P. Nagarajan made her understand that in the scenes in which Jil Jil Ramamani appeared she would be the center of attention. In 1974 she shared the screen with the legendary comedian Mehmood in the Hindi movie Kunwara Baap. Cho and Manorama were paired together in 20 films which included Malligai Poo, Annaiyum Pidhavum, Dharisanam, Anbai Thedi, Nanaivin Nindraval, Nirai Kudam, Aayiram Poi, Muhammad bin Tughluq, Bommalattam, Delhi Mappilai, Vilayattu Pillai, Kanavan, Rojavin Raja and Suryagandhi.

The character she was given by K. Balachander in the 1989 film Unnal Mudiyum Thambi is considered a cornerstone by her as it was completelly new to her. She stated in an interview on Toronto TV that one of the most challenging characters she played was the role of the 50-year-old unmarried woman in the 1990 film Nadigan with Sathyaraj. She has acted with many lead comedians across five different generations, which includes M. R. Radha, K. A. Thangavelu, J. P. Chandrababu, A. Karunanithi, Ennatha Kannaiya, V. K. Ramasamy, Nagesh, Cho Ramaswamy, Thengai Seenivasan, M. R. R. Vasu, Suruli Rajan, Vennira Aadai Moorthy, Janagaraj, Pandiarajan, Goundamani, Senthil, Vivek and Vadivelu.

She has been in films with seven chief ministers. She played the female lead in the plays written, directed and acted by C. N. Annadurai, former chief minister of Tamil Nadu. She has also appeared in plays with another chief minister of Tamil Nadu, M. Karunanidhi. She has acted in films with MGR, J. Jayalalithaa and Vijay, who later became chief ministers of Tamil Nadu. She has also acted in Telugu films with Dr. N. T. Rama Rao, who became the chief minister of Andhra Pradesh. She also acted with Vijay (actor) in Rasigan and Senthoorapandi. When asked which character of hers she found most hilarious to play, she specified the role of a talkative female, who is forced to act dumb in a film called Unakkum Vazhvu Varum. She had played this role along with Thengai Srinivasan. She was bitten by a Bungarus fasciatus snake during the shooting of Manjal Kungumam and was admitted to hospital. Coincidentally, after recovery, the next scene she had to act in was ''Aadi Viradham,'' where she had to bathe a snake statue and sing a lullaby for it, and after being asked by the director whether she would like to perform she agreed enthusiasthically.

Manorama, being a close friend of Jayalalithaa and of the firm belief that Jayalalithaa would never be corrupt, campaigned against actor Rajinikanth in support of her friend in the 1996 elections.

In one of her last interviews, in 2015, she was asked if she had any regrets about her life. She answered: "I've no regrets at all. I'm blessed in this life. Even in my next birth, I want to be born as Manorama again. I want this same life, and the same people around me. Most of all, I want my mom with me again." In an interview with BBC in 2015 she said: "If I had chosen to act only as a heroine then I would have disappeared from the scene long ago. So, I decided to take up comedic roles, thats why I survived in the industry for nearly six decades".

When asked as to how she was able to do more than 1500 films, she said in her interview in September 2015, "I believe I am a blessed person. Without God's will, I couldn't have acted in so many films. It all just happened in my life, and you won't believe it, but I still have the urge to act. The one person who is the reason for all my success is my mom. She did everything for me in life, and I miss her the most now. Whatever I achieve or have achieved in life is only because of her."

She supported young talents and budding directors in her old age. In 2013 she acted in a Tamil short film named Thaaye Nee Kannurangu, directed by LGR Saravanan, in which acted as a cancer patient and the mother of Mr. Srikanth.

== Death ==
Between 2013 and 2015, Manorama had suffered ill-health resulting in hospital stays. She died in Chennai at 11.20 pm on 10 October 2015 due to multiple organ failure at the age of 78.

=== Reactions ===
Tamil Nadu reacted to Manorama's death with an outpouring of grief; numerous tributes were paid to the deceased actor across the state and on social media. Chief Minister Jayalalithaa laid a wreath on the body at the actor's home in T. Nagar. Ms. Jayalalithaa said, "There had been no accomplished achiever like Manorama in the Tamil film world and there would be none in the future as well." Jayalalitha was quoted as saying, "I was shocked to hear about her death. She was an elder sister to me. I used to call her Manorama while she called me Ammu. We used to visit each other's houses whenever we didn't have shootings." The chief minister also said, "If Sivaji Ganesan was Nadigar Thilagam, Manorama was Nadigai Thilagam." Others who paid homage to the actress include Rajinikanth, Kamal Haasan, Vijay, Vikram, Sivakumar, Dhanush, Ajith Kumar, M. Karunanidhi, K. Veeramani, G. K. Vasan, Delhi Ganesh, R. Sarathkumar, Ilayaraja, Vairamuthu, Karthik, S. Ve. Shekhar, Vijayakumar, Goundamani, K. Bhagyaraj, R. Parthiban, Radhika, Vimal, Silambarasan, Suriya, Karthi, Vikraman, S. Thanu, T. Rajender and Pandiarajan.

== Awards and honors ==
- Guinness World Records – 1985 – for acting in over 1000 films.
- Padma Shri – 2002

Event	Year	Category	Movie	Outcome
National Film Awards	1989	Best Supporting Actress	Pudhiya Padhai	Won
Filmfare Awards South	1995	Lifetime Achievement Award – South		Won
Filmfare Awards South	2009	Best Supporting Actress – Telugu	Arundhati	Nominated
Filmfare Awards South	2010	Best Supporting Actress – Tamil	Singam	Nominated
Tamil Nadu State Film Awards	1968	Best Character Artiste (Female)	Thillaanaa Mohanambal	Won
Tamil Nadu State Film Awards	1979	Special Prize	Avan Aval Adhu	Won
Tamil Nadu State Film Awards	1981	Best Comedian	Ethir Veetu Jannal	Won
Tamil Nadu State Film Awards	1982	Best Comedian	Oru Vaarisu Uruvagiradhu	Won
Tamil Nadu State Film Awards	1983	Best Comedian – Female	Paayum Puli	Won
Tamil Nadu State Film Awards	1990	Honorary Award – MGR Award		Won
Tamil Nadu State Film Awards	1992	Honorary Award – Jayalalitha Award		Won
Tamil Nadu Cinema Kalaimandram Awards	2013	Favourite Film Star		Won

== Discography ==
Manorama also holds a record of singing for many notable music directors. She has rendered her voice for M. S. Viswanathan, Ilayaraja, A. R. Rahman and many other composers.

Year	Movie	Song	Composer	Co-singers
1963	Ratha Thilagam	Pogathey Pogathey En Kanava (parody)	Viswanathan–Ramamoorthy	
1964	Magale Un Samathu	Thaatha Thaatha	G. K. Venkatesh	L. R. Eswari
1965	Kanni Thai	Vazhai Vidhu Ilai	K. V. Mahadevan	Tharapuram Sundararajan
1967	Anubavam Pudhumai	Enna Ninaithu	M. S. Viswanathan	
1967	Magaraasi	Aalai Parthal	Shankar–Ganesh	T. M. Soundararajan, Tharapuram Sundararajan & P. Susheela
1968	Bommalattam	Vaa Vathiyare Oottanda (Jambajaar Jakku)	V. Kumar	
1969	Aayiram Poi	Kaveri Thanniyil Kulichavadi	V. Kumar	L. R. Eswari
1969	Aayiram Poi	Thamizh Vidu Thoodhu	V. Kumar	Tharapuram Sundararajan
1969	Dharisanam	Pogadhe Aiyyaa Pogadhe	Soolamangalam Rajalakshmi	S. Rangarajan
1969	Poova Thalaiya	Poda Chonnaal Pottukkiren	M. S. Viswanathan	T. M. Soundararajan & A. L. Raghavan
1969	Singapore Seeman	Mollamaari Kepmaari	Shankar–Ganesh	
1970	Thirumalai Thenkumari	Azhage Thamizhe Nee	Kunnakudi Vaidyanathan	Seerkazhi Govindarajan, Sarala, M. R. Vijaya, A. L. Raghavan, Tharapuram Sundararajan & L. R. Anjali
1971	Arunodhayam	Yeamandi Neenga	K.V. Mahadevan	
1971	Justice Viswanathan	Ada Epdithaan	Vedha	T. M. Soundararajan
1971	Kankatchi	Kaadai Pidippom	Kunnakkudi Vaidyanathan	S. V. Ponnusamy
1971	Thanga Gopuram	Dhimkita Dhimkita	S. M. Subbaiah Naidu	S. V. Ponnusamy
1971	Vidyarthikale Ithile Ithile	Chinchilam Chiluchilam	M. B. Sreenivasan	Adoor Bhasi
1972	Kadhalikka Vanga	Kadhal Endral Athu Then	J. V. Raghavulu	P. Susheela
1972	Karundhel Kannayiram	Poontha Malliyile	Shyam-Philips	S. P. Balasubrahmanyam & Pattom Sadan
1972	Mr. Sampath	Alangaaram Podhumadi	M. S. Viswanathan	T. M. Soundararajan
1972	Needhi	Engaladhu Boomi	M. S. Viswanathan	T. M. Soundararajan, P. Susheela & J. P. Chandrababu
1973	Ganga Gowri	Thimikitta Thimikkitta	M. S. Viswanathan	
1973	Kasi Yathirai	Amaravathi Nenjame	Shankar–Ganesh	S. V. Ponnusamy
1973	Manjal Kungumam	Raa Raa Naa Bhavaa	Shankar–Ganesh	S. P. Balasubrahmanyam
1973	Petha Manam Pithu	Ammaadi Uzhaikkum Kaigal	V. Kumar	T. M. Soundararajan, P. Susheela & S. V. Ponnusamy
1973	Suryagandhi	Theriyatho Nokku Theriyatho	M. S. Viswanathan	
1974	Ippadiyum Oru Penn	Agapatta Varayil	P. Bhanumathi	P. Bhanumathi
1974	Pandhattam	Un Raadhaiyai	Shankar–Ganesh	
1975	Hennu Samsarada Kannu	Hosadenu Kaane Idaralli	Vijaya Bhaskar	
1975	Vaazhnthu Kaattugiren	Yemmi Mynaa Summa Summa	M. S. Viswanathan	
1976	Unakkaga Naan	Kaadu Vetta	M. S. Viswanathan	L. R. Eswari & S. C. Krishnan
1977	Chakravarthy	Thatthalangudhu Thalathalakkudhu	V. Kumar	
1977	Chakravarthy	Aarathi Yedungadi	V. Kumar	P. Susheela
1977	Sonnathai Seiven	Adiye Kaali	V. Kumar	
1978	Achchani	Athu Maathiram	Ilaiyaraja	Malaysia Vasudevan
1978	Paavathin Sambalam	Raave Raave	Shankar–Ganesh	S. P. Balasubrahmanyam
1978	Unakkum Vaazhvu Varum	Manjakayiru Thali Manja Kayiru	V. Kumar	
1978	Vaazha Ninaiththaal Vaazhalaam	Kaanaan Kuruvikku Kalyanamam (Two versions)	Ilayaraja	
1979	Kuppathu Raja	Kodikatti Parakkuthada	M. S. Viswanathan	T. M. Soundararajan, Malaysia Vasudevan & L. R. Eswari
1979	Pancha Boodham	Azudha Pulla Sirikkanum	Shankar–Ganesh	
1980	Avan Aval Adhu	Andha Naal Mudharkkondu	M. S. Viswanathan	L. R. Eswari
1980	Oru Marathu Paravaigal	Mottu Malli	Shankar–Ganesh	T. K. Kala
1981	Savaal	Kai Nalla Kaiyappa	M. S. Viswanathan	Malaysia Vasudevan & Kovai Soundarajan
1982	Amma	Bodhaiyil Pongum	Shankar–Ganesh	Malaysia Vasudevan & L. R. Anjali
1982	Boom Boom Maadu	Ungal Oottu Engaluke	Ilaiyaraja	
1982	Manal Kayiru	Mappillai Sir	M. S. Viswanathan	Malaysia Vasudevan & Visu
1982	Thalaimagan	Ada Naan Pettha Mavane	Shankar–Ganesh	Malaysia Vasudevan & S. P. Sailaja
1982	Simla Special	Kuthura Kuthulla	M. S. Viswanathan	Malaysia Vasudevan
1983	Kai Varisai	Vaadi Pulle	Shankar–Ganesh	Malaysia Vasudevan
1984	Madras Vathiyar	Madras Vathiyar	Shankar–Ganesh	Sundararajan & Udhayamaran
1984	Rajathi Rojakili	Athukkulle Yelelo	Chandrabose	Chandrabose
1985	Kutravaaligal	Nalla Thambi Kottaiyelea	Shankar–Ganesh	
1985	Sri Raghavendrar	Paarthale Theriyaatho	Ilayaraja	Vani Jairam
1986	Maragatha Veenai	Chee Chee Ponga	Ilaiyaraja	Malaysia Vasudevan
1988	Paatti Sollai Thattathe	Delhikku Raja Analum	Chandrabose	
1988	Paadatha Thenikkal	Aathi Antham	Ilaiyaraaja	Ilaiyaraaja, Krishnamoorthy, S. S. Chandran & P. Susheela
1989	Thaaya Thaarama	Aai Aatthi Pudhu	Shankar–Ganesh	Vani Jairam
1989	Thangamana Purushan	Thaaikulame Thaaikulame	Shankar–Ganesh	
1991	Aadi Viratham	Vadakkile Irukkuddu Thiruppathi	Shankar–Ganesh	Ranjini
1991	Pondatti Pondattithan	Pondatti Pondattithan	Gangai Amaran	
1992	Kaviya Thalaivan	Sandhana Malargalai	Aravind Siddhartha	K. J. Yesudas & Swarnalatha
1992	Magudam	Karpulla Kaalaiye	Ilaiyaraja	S. P. Balasubrahmanyam
1994	May Madham	Madrasa Sutthi	A. R. Rahman	Shahul Hameed, Swarnalatha & G. V. Prakash Kumar
1995	Deva	Kothagiri Kuppamma	Deva	Vijay & Swarnalatha
1995	Marumagan	Maamaa Maamaa Enakku Masakkai	Deva	Mano & Malgudi Subha
1995	Murai Maman	Anandham Anandham	Vidyasagar	P. Unni Krishnan & Sujatha
1995	Muthu Kaalai	Vaazha Ilai.... Eredutthu Eredutthu	Ilaiyaraaja	S. P. Balasubrahmanyam
1996	Nattupura Pattu	Nattupura Pattu	Ilayaraja	K. S. Chithra
1996	Parambarai	Thanjaavooru Kaalaiyile	Deva	K. S. Chithra, Krishnaraj & Sundararajan
1997	Arunachalam	Mathadu Mathadu	Deva	S. P. Balasubrahmanyam, Sujatha & Meera Krishnan
1997	Vallal	Puliyampatti Kosavampatti	Deva	
1998	Pooveli	Kathai Solla Poren	Bharadwaj	Karthik & Sujatha
2000	Chinna Ramasamy Periya Ramasamy	Vacha Payiru... Unnai Naan	Ilaiyaraja	S. P. Balasubrahmanyam & K. S. Chithra
2000	Thirunelveli	Ini Naalum Thirunaal	Ilaiyaraaja	Arunmozhi, Swarnalatha, Ilaiyaraaja & S. N. Surendar
2003	Anbe Anbe	Rettai Jadai Rakkamma	Bharadwaj	T. L. Maharajan, Manikka Vinayagam, Swarnalatha & Srinivas
2006	Pasa Kiligal	Thangeiyenum	Vidhyasagar	Tippu, Karthik & Sujatha
2015	Perandi			
