= List of Tamil films of 1979 =

The following is a list of films produced in the Tamil film industry in India in 1979, in alphabetical order.

Post-amendment to the Tamil Nadu Entertainments Tax Act 1939 on 1 April 1958, gross jumped to 140 per cent of net. Commercial Taxes Department disclosed ₹19.82 crore in entertainment tax revenue for the year.

== 1979 ==
| Title | Director | Production | Music | Cast |
|---|---|---|---|---|
| Aadu Pambe | Amirtham | Poompuhar Productions | M. S. Viswanathan | Jaishankar, Sangeeta, Sumithra |
| Aarilirunthu Arubathu Varai | S. P. Muthuraman | P. A. Art Productions | Ilaiyaraaja | Rajinikanth, Fatafat Jayalaxmi, Jaya Guhanathan, Cho, Sangeetha |
| Aasaikku Vayasillai | Gopu | Shanmugam Cine Enterprises | M. S. Viswanathan | R. Muthuraman, K. R. Vijaya |
| Adhisaya Raagam | Mohanraj-Suresh | Film Talents Acedamy | | Delhi Ganesh, Jamila |
| Adukku Malli | K. S. Gopalakrishnan | Meena Art Pictures | Shankar–Ganesh | Vijayakumar, Sujatha, Vanitha, Thengai Srinivasan |
| Agal Vilakku | R. Selvaraj | Sunil Pictures | Ilaiyaraaja | Vijayakanth, Shoba |
| Allaudinaum Arputha Vilakkum | I. V. Sasi | Supriya Creations | G. Devarajan | Kamal Haasan, Gemini Ganesan, Rajinikanth, Jayabharathi, Sripriya, Savitri |
| Alankari | Gopu | Durga Bagavathy Films | Vijaya Bhaskar | Suruli Rajan, Manorama |
| Anbe Sangeetha | K. Narayanan | Alagu Movies | Ilaiyaraaja | Jai Ganesh, Sumithra, Radhika, Thengai Srinivasan |
| Anbin Alaigal | M. Mastan | Silver Screen Entertainment | A. T. Ummer | Master Sekhar, 'Baby' Indira |
| Annai Oru Aalayam | R. Thyagarajan | Devar Films | Ilaiyaraaja | Rajinikanth, Sripriya, Anjali Devi |
| Appothe Sonnene Kettiya | V. T. Arasu | Shasti Films | Jaya Vijaya | Sathyapriya |
| Azhage Unnai Aarathikkiren | C. V. Sridhar | Sri Bharani Chithra Enterprises | Ilaiyaraaja | Vijayakumar, Latha, Jai Ganesh, Nagesh |
| Azhiyatha Kolangal | Balu Mahendra | Devi Films | Salil Chowdhury | Shoba, Pratap K. Pothen |
| Chakkalathi | Devaraj Mohan | Subburaja Combines | Ilaiyaraaja | Sudhakar, Shoba, Ambika |
| Chellakili | K. M. Balakrishnan | Vallivelan Movies | M. S. Viswanathan | Vijayakumar, Sumithra, Sripriya |
| Chithirai Sevvanam | N. C. Chakraborthy | Dhanasekhari Enterprises | M. S. Viswanathan | |
| Devathai | P. N. Menon | P. P. Creations | Shyam | Sivakumar, Jai Ganesh, Jayanthi, Lavanya |
| Dhairya Lakshmi | Gopu | Vijayavani Combines | G. K. Venkatesh | Jaishankar, Lakshmi, Srikanth |
| Dharma Yuddham | R. C. Sakthi | Charu Chithra Films | Ilaiyaraaja | Rajinikanth, Sridevi, Thengai Srinivasan |
| Enippadigal | P. Madhavan | Ramya Chithra Productions | K. V. Mahadevan | Sivakumar, Shoba |
| Ennadi Meenakshi | K. Narayanan | Sri Dhanalakshmi Creation | Shankar–Ganesh | Sivakumar, Sripriya |
| Gnana Kuzhandhai | K. Kameshwara Rao | Abirami Enterprises | K. V. Mahadevan | Gemini Ganesan, Latha, Jai Ganesh, Jayachitra, Sujatha, Vennira Aadai Nirmala, Nagesh, Thengai Srinivasan, Manorama, Tambaram Lalitha |
| Idhaya Roja | S. R. Dasrathan | Chandrika Cine Arts | M. S. Viswanathan | Srikanth, Jaiganesh |
| Imayam | V. Srinivasan | Muktha Films | M. S. Viswanathan | Sivaji Ganesan, Srividya, A. Sakunthala, Thengai Srinivasan |
| Inikkum Ilamai | M. A. Kaja | Kadayanallur Cine Arts | Shankar–Ganesh | Sudhakar, Radhika, Vijayakanth, Meera |
| Jaya Nee Jayuchutte | A. Jagannathan | Gomathi International | Ilaiyaraaja | Srikanth, Major Sundarrajan, Prameela, Kanchana |
| Kadamai Nenjam | Durai | Uma Shankar Combines | Shankar–Ganesh | Jaishankar, Srividya, Pandari Bai, Sachu, R.S.Manohar, Ramadas. |
| Kadavul Amaitha Medai | S. P. Muthuraman | Thirisool Films | Ilaiyaraaja | Sivakumar, Sumithra, Major Sundarrajan |
| Kalyanaraman | G. N. Rangarajan | P. A. Art Productions | Ilaiyaraaja | Kamal Haasan, Sridevi, Thengai Srinivasan |
| Kamasasthiram | Balamurugan | Sri Navamani Productions | M. S. Viswanathan | Jaishankar, Seema |
| Kandhar Alangaram | K. Sundaram | Aaya Creations | Kunnakudi Vaidyanathan | Thangavelu, V.K. Ramasamy |
| Kanni Paruvathile | B. V. Balaguru | Sri Amman Creations | Shankar–Ganesh | Rajesh, K. Bhagyaraj, Vadivukkarasi |
| Karai Kadantha Kurathi | Mandurai Babuji | S. M. M. Productions | Gangai Amaran | Sudhakar, Vanithasri |
| Kavari Maan | S. P. Muthuraman | Rajanna Enterprises | Ilaiyaraaja | Sivaji Ganesan, Vijayakumar, Sridevi, Prameela |
| Kizhakkum Merkum Sandhikkindrana | R. Pattabhiraman | Mangadu Amman Films | M. S. Viswanathan | Jaishankar, Simple Kapadia, Fatafat Jayalaxmi |
| Kudisai | Jayabharathi | Jwala | G. Kamesh | Dandayupani |
| Kuppathu Raja | T. R. Ramanna | Suriyalakshmi Pictures | M. S. Viswanathan | Vijayakumar, Rajinikanth, Manjula, Padmapriya |
| Kuzhandhaiyai Thedi | R. Pattabhiraman | Sri Balambika Productions | Gangai Amaran | Jaishankar, Anuradha |
| Lakshmi | T. K. Mohan | Nageswari Films | Ilaiyaraaja | Sridevi, Jai Ganesh, Master Sridhar, Jamila |
| Mahalakshmi | R. Pattabhiraman | Arumugam Arts | M. S. Viswanathan | Jaishankar, Sangeetha |
| Malligai Mohini | Durai | Pallavi Enterprises | G. K. Venkatesh | Latha, Malini Fonseka |
| Mambazhathu Vandu | R. C. Sakthi | Vijayaraja Combines | Shankar–Ganesh | Jai Ganesh, Sathyapriya, Sarath Babu |
| Mangala Vaathiyam | K. Shankar | Saregama Films | M. S. Viswanathan | Kamal Haasan, Sripriya |
| Manthoppu Killiye | M. A. Kaja | Kadayanallur Cine Arts | Shankar–Ganesh | Sudhakar, Deepa, Major Sundarrajan, Gandhimathi, Suruli Rajan |
| Mayandi | R. Pattabhiraman | Jai Geetha Combines | M. S. Viswanathan | Jaishankar, Jayachitra, A. Sakunthala |
| Mugathil Mugam Paarkalaam | A. Jagannathan | S. G. Movies | Ilaiyaraaja | Vijayakumar, Sumithra, Radhika |
| Muthal Iravu | A. Jagannathan | Kay Cee Films | Ilaiyaraaja | Sivakumar, Sumithra, Sathyapriya, Sathyaraj |
| Naan Nandri Solven | Panasai Maniyan | N. P. M. Films | Shyam | Jamuna |
| Naan Oru Kai Paarkiren | K. Sornam | Suryalaya Films | Shankar–Ganesh | Jaishankar, Sridevi |
| Naan Vazhavaippen | D. Yoganand | Vallinayagi Films | Ilaiyaraaja | Sivaji Ganesan, K. R. Vijaya, Rajinikanth, Thengai Srinivasan |
| Nadagame Ullagam | Krishnan–Panju | Vijayambika Pictures | V. Kumar | K. R. Vijaya, Sarath Babu, Mohan Babu, Cho |
| Nallathoru Kudumbam | K. Vijayan | Sujatha Cine Arts | Ilaiyaraaja | Sivaji Ganesan, Vanisri, Deepa |
| Nangooram | Timothy Weeraratne | Lankal Films | V. Kumar & Premasiri Khemadasa | Lakshmi, R. Muthuraman, Fareena Lye, Vijaya Kumaranatunga, V. S. Raghavan, Suruli Rajan, Ceylon Manohar |
| Nee Sirithal Naan Sirippen | V. Rajagopal | Sound & Sight | Shyam | Srikanth, Sivachandran, Sumithra, Jaya Prabha |
| Neechal Kulam | T. R. Ramanna | Mani Amman Creation | Dharapuram Sundarrajan | Suman, Lavanya |
| Needhikku Mun Neeya Naana | Durai | Sri Gomathi Sankar Films | M. S. Viswanathan | Vijayakumar, Latha |
| Neelakadalin Orathile | K. Shankar | Fernando Productions | M. S. Viswanathan | Gamini Fonseka, Sripriya, Radha Saluja |
| Neela Malargal | Krishnan–Panju | Sabari Cini Creations | M. S. Viswanathan | Kamal Haasan, Sridevi, K. R. Vijaya |
| Neeya? | Durai | Sri Chamundeswari Films | Shankar–Ganesh | Kamal Haasan, Vijayakumar, Sripriya, Ravichandran, Latha, Manjula, Deepa, Jai Ganesh, Srikanth, |
| Nenjukku Needhi | Amirtham | Sivaleela Cine Arts | Shankar–Ganesh | Jaishankar, Sangeeta |
| Ninaithale Inikkum | K. Balachander | Premalaya Productions | M. S. Viswanathan | Kamalahasan, Jaya Prada, Rajinikanth, Geetha |
| Niram Maratha Pookkal | Bharathiraja | Lena Productions | Ilaiyaraaja | Sudhakar, Radhika, Vijayan, Rathi |
| Nool Veli | K. Balachander | Kalakendra Movies | M. S. Viswanathan | Sarath Babu, Saritha, Sujatha |
| Oorukku Oru Raja | S. T. Dhandapani | Sivakumar Cine Arts | | |
| Ore Vaanam Ore Bhoomi | I. V. Sasi | Geo Movies Productions | M. S. Viswanathan | Jaishankar, K. R. Vijaya, Seema |
| Oru Koyil Iru Dheebangal | S. P. Muthuraman | Lalith Priya Productions | V. Dakshinamoorthy | Vijay Babu |
| Oru Vidukadhai Oru Thodarkadhai | M. A. Kaja | Sri Devipriya Films | Gangai Amaran | Vijayan, Shoba, Vijay Babu, Abarna |
| Padhai Marinaal | Durai | Lalitha Arts | Shankar–Ganesh | Vikram, Seema, Sarath Babu, Vanitha |
| Pagalil Oru Iravu | I. V. Sasi | Murali Movies | Ilaiyaraaja | Vijayakumar, Sridevi, Seema |
| Pancha Boodham | Sathyam | Yasodha Films | Shankar–Ganesh | M. R. Radha, Srikanth, Sangeetha |
| Pancha Kalyani | N. Sambandam | U. M. Productions | Shyam | Sivachandran, Vasanthi |
| Pappathi | R. K. Shanmugham | Chinnavar Creation | Shankar–Ganesh | Jai Ganesh, Rathi |
| Pasi | Durai | Sunitha Cine Arts | Shankar–Ganesh | Shoba, Delhi Ganesh, Vijayan |
| Pattakkathi Bhairavan | V. B. Rajendra Prasad | Jagapathi Art Pictures | Ilaiyaraaja | Sivaji Ganesan, Jayasudha, Sridevi |
| Ponnu Oorukku Pudhusu | R. Selvaraj | United International | Ilaiyaraaja | Sudhakar, Vijayan, Saritha |
| Poonthalir | Devaraj–Mohan | S. M. Creations | Ilaiyaraaja | Sivakumar, Sujatha, Suruli Rajan |
| Portar Ponnusamy | Adiyar | Jeppiar Pictures | M. S. Viswanathan | Thengai Srinivasan, Vadivukkarasi |
| Puthiya Vaarpugal | Bharathiraja | Manoj Creations | Ilaiyaraaja | K. Bhagyaraj, Rathi, Goundamani |
| Raja Rajeswari | N. Sambandam | Cinemalaya Productions | Shankar–Ganesh | R. Muthuraman, Sujatha, Srikanth, Abarna |
| Rosappu Ravikkaikari | Devaraj–Mohan | Vivekanandha Productions | Ilaiyaraaja | Sivakumar, Deepa, Sivachandran |
| Sigappukkal Mookkuthi | Valampuri Somanathan | Swarnambika Films | M. S. Viswanathan | Kamal Haasan, Sridevi, Vijayakumar, Roja Ramani |
| Siri Siri Mama | Karunanidi | Manju Films | Shankar–Ganesh | Vijayakumar, Padmapriya, Srikamu |
| Sri Rama Jayam | V. Srinivasan | Karthigai Films | M. S. Viswanathan | Thengai Srinivasan, Sujatha, Abarna |
| Suprabadham | K. Shankar | P. V. T. Productions | M. S. Viswanathan | R. Muthuraman, K. R. Vijaya, Jai Ganesh, Sripriya |
| Suvarilladha Chiththirangal | K. Bhagyaraj | Bagavathy Creations | Gangai Amaran | Sudhakar, Sumathi, K. Bhagyaraj |
| Thaayillamal Naan Illai | R. Thyagarajan | Devar Films | Shankar–Ganesh | Kamal Haasan, Sridevi, Jai Ganesh |
| Thevaigal | N. S. Ravishankar | Amirtha Jothi Combines | Shyam | Jai Ganesh, Sumithra |
| Thirisoolam | K. Vijayan | Sivaji Productions | M. S. Viswanathan | Sivaji Ganesan, K. R. Vijaya, Sripriya |
| Thisai Maariya Paravaigal | S. Jagadeesan | P. S. V. Pictures | M. S. Viswanathan | Sarath Babu, Sumalatha, Major Sundarrajan |
| Uthiripookkal | Mahendran | Dimple Creations | Ilaiyaraaja | Vijayan, Ashwini |
| Urangadha Kanavugal | A. K. Velan | Nyani Brothers | Shankar–Ganesh | Delhi Ganesh, Rajani |
| Vallavan Varugiran | R. Sundaram | Modern Theatres | Rajesh | Reena, Ramakrishna, Ceylon Manohar, Jayakala, Aarathi, Vennira Aadai Moorthy |
| Veettukku Veedu Vasappadi | P. Madhavan | Arun Prasad Movies | Rajan–Nagendra | Vijayakumar, Suman, Shoba, Rathi |
| Velli Ratham | Krishnan–Panju | Astalakshmi Pictures | M. S. Viswanathan | Vijayakumar, Manjula, Jamila, Kovai Sarala |
| Velum Mayilum Thunai | Ra. Sankaran | Sri Devi Priya Films | Shankar–Ganesh | M. R. Radha, Vijayakumar, Major Sundarrajan, Sripriya, Radhika, Cho, Manorama |
| Vetrikku Oruvan | S. P. Muthuraman | Vijayabhaskar Films | Ilaiyaraaja | Sivaji Ganesan, Sripriya, Mohan Babu |
| Yarukku Yar Kaaval | Malliyam Rajagopal | Neo Manijeh Cine Productions | K. J. Joy | Sivakumar, Sripriya, Srikanth, Jayasri |
