= Annapurna (disambiguation) =

Annapurna is a massif in the Himalayas, in north-central Nepal.

Annapurna or Annapoorna may also refer to:

== Places ==
- Annapurna II, part of the Annapurna mountain range
- Annapurna III, a mountain in the Annapurna mountain range
- Annapurna IV, a mountain of the Annapurna range in the Himalayas
- Annapurna, Nepal, a village in Bhojpur District in the east of the country
- Annapurna Rural Municipality (disambiguation), Nepal
- Annapurna Sanctuary, a high glacial basin lying below the mountain range

== Companies ==
- Annapurna Interactive, the video gaming arm of Annapurna Pictures
- Annapurna Labs, an Israel-based microelectronics company
- Annapurna Pictures, a U.S.-based film production company
- Annapurna Studios, an India-based film production company
- Annapurna Theatre, the pioneer of Oriya Theatre Company

== Entertainment ==
- Annapurna (book), a 1951 story of the first recorded expedition to reach the summit
- Annapurna (film), a 1960 Indian Telugu-language film
- Annapoorna (film), a 1964 Indian Kannada-language film
- Neem Annapurna, a 1979 Indian Bengali-language film
- Annapoorani (1978 film), a 1978 Indian Tamil-language film
- Annapoorani: The Goddess of Food, a 2023 Indian Tamil-language food film
- "Annapoorani", a song from the 2022 Indian film DSP

== People ==
- Annapurna (actress) (born 1948), Telugu film actress
- Annapurna Devi (Roshanara Khan, born 1927), Indian classical instrumentalist

== Other ==
- Annapurna (goddess), the Hindu goddess of food and nourishment
- Annapurna FM, a Nepali radio station
- Annapurna Upanishad, a Sanskrit text and one of the minor Upanishads of Hinduism
- Annapoorna Gowrishankar, a South Indian restaurant chain

== See also ==
- Anapurna (horse) (born 2016), winner of the 2019 Epsom Oaks
