= Petha Manam Pithu =

- Poster
- Directed by: S. P. Muthuraman
- Screenplay by: C. Guhanathan
- Based on: Manini by Mahadevshastri Joshi
- Produced by: R. Ratnamala; S. Baskar
- Starring: Savitri; R. Muthuraman
- Cinematography: Babu
- Edited by: R. Vittal
- Music by: V. Kumar
- Production company: Victor Movies
- Release date: 14 January 1973
- Country: India
- Language: Tamil

Petha Manam Pithu (transl. The mother's heart is mad) is a 1973 Indian Tamil-language drama film directed by S. P. Muthuraman and written by C. Guhanathan. A remake of the Marathi film Manini (1961), it stars Savitri and R. Muthuraman. The film was released on 14 January 1973 and became a success.

== Cast ==
- Savitri as Meenakshi
- R. Muthuraman as Ramu
- Major Sundarrajan
- B. Jaya as Seetha
- Jayasudha as Radha
- Srikanth as Ramesh
- Cho
- V. Gopalakrishnan
- A. Sakunthala
- Suruli Rajan
- Manorama
- Gandhimathi
- Seema

== Production ==
Petha Manam Pithu, a remake of the Marathi film Manini (1961), is S. P. Muthuraman's second film as director. It is Telugu actress Jayasudha's first Tamil film and was also the acting debut of Jayachandran. C. Guhanathan, who wrote Muthuraman's directorial debut Kanimuthu Paappa (1972), was retained as screenwriter for this project too.

== Soundtrack ==
The music was composed by V. Kumar.

Track listing
No.	Title	Singer(s)	Length
1.	"Ammadi Uzhaikkum Kai Onga Vendum"	T. M. Soundararajan, P. Susheela, Manorama, S. V. Ponnusami
2.	"Ilamaiyin Ragasiyam Sollamal"	L. R. Eswari
3.	"Kalam Namakku Thozhan"	T. M. Soundararajan, P. Susheela

== Release and reception ==
Petha Manam Pithu was released on 14 January 1973. Kanthan of Kalki lauded the performances of Muthuraman and Jaya, but criticised the story for not offering anything new. Navamani praised the acting, dialogues, music and direction. The film was a success, and Muthuraman's first to run for over 100 days in theatres.
