= Then Sindhudhe Vaanam =

- Theatrical release poster
- Directed by: Ra. Sankaran
- Screenplay by: Ra. Sankaran
- Story by: Doctor Balakrishnan
- Produced by: V. C. Ganesan
- Starring: Sivakumar; Kamal Haasan; Jayachitra; Rani Chandra
- Cinematography: K. S. Baskar Rao
- Edited by: M. S. Umanath; M. Mani
- Music by: V. Kumar
- Production company: Sudarsan Enterprises
- Release date: 11 April 1975
- Country: India
- Language: Tamil

Then Sindhudhe Vaanam (transl. The sky is spilling honey) is a 1975 Indian Tamil-language film directed by Ra. Sankaran, starring Sivakumar and Kamal Haasan. It is a remake of the 1973 Malayalam film Ladies Hostel. The film was released on 11 April 1975, in the week of Puthandu.

== Cast ==
- Sivakumar as Raja
- Kamal Haasan as Ravi
- Jayachitra as Lalli
- Rani Chandra as Rama
- Srikanth as Gopi
- Cho Ramaswamy as Pavadai
- Manorama as Muthamma
- K. A. Thangavelu as Singaram Pillai
- Neelu as 'Lawyer' Kundu Kunchumani Iyer
- Major Sundarrajan as Ramalinga Pillai (Guest appearance)
- Sukumari as Bangajam
- S. N. Lakshmi as Annamma
- Vijaya Chandrika
- C. R. Parthiban

== Production ==
The film began production in October 1974. It is the second film produced by Sudarsan Enterprises after Onne Onnu Kanne Kannu (1974), made by the same director, Ra. Sankaran. Kamal Haasan worked as dance choreographer in the song "Yezhuthatha Paadal".

== Soundtrack ==
The music was composed by V. Kumar and lyrics were written by Vaali. Ilaiyaraaja worked as a session guitarist in the song "Unnidam Mayangugiren".

Song	Singers	Length
"Unnidam Mayangugiren"	K. J. Yesudas	04:43
"Vaa Vaa Kuttappa"	Manorama	03:42
"Yezhuthatha Paadal"	T. M. Soundararajan, K. Swarna	04:08
"Iyarkai Ezhil Konjugindra	P. Susheela	
