= Aayirathil Oruthi =

1975 film

- Directed by: Avinashi Mani
- Written by: S. Jagadeesan
- Produced by: Santha Rajagopal
- Starring: K. R. Vijaya; Sujatha; K. Balaji; Srikanth; Kamal Haasan; Jayasudha
- Cinematography: V. Selvaraj
- Edited by: Vijayanand
- Music by: V. Kumar
- Production company: K. R. G. Pictures
- Release date: 14 March 1975
- Running time: 118 minutes
- Country: India
- Language: Tamil

Aayirathil Oruthi (transl. One girl in a thousand) is a 1975 Indian Tamil-language drama film, directed by Avinashi Mani. The film stars K. R. Vijaya and K. Balaji. Jayasudha plays the love interest of Kamal Haasan and Srikanth plays the role of Sujatha's lover.

== Cast ==
- K. R. Vijaya as Janaki
- K. Balaji as Gopi
- Srikanth as Sathish
- Sujatha as Lakshmi
- Kamal Haasan as Kamal
- Jayasudha as Sudha
- Thengai Srinivasan as Kabalishwaran
- Manorama as Singari
- Suruli Rajan as Sivakolunthu
- A. Sakunthala
- S. V. Ramadoss as Paranthaman (Guest Appearance)
- Sukumari as Jailer of police (Guest appearance)
- S. A. Ashokan (Guest Appearance)

== Production ==
K. R. G. Pictures produced the film. Kamal Haasan received a salary of ₹17,000. Bharathiraja worked as an assistant director. The final length of the film's prints were 3,920.69 metres (12,863.2 ft) long.

== Soundtrack ==
The music was composed by V. Kumar.

Song	Singers	Lyrics
"Kovil Nalla Kovil"	P. Susheela	Kannadasan
"Ninaithathai Mudipathu"	S. P. Balasubrahmanyam, L. R. Eswari	Vaali

== Reception ==
Kanthan of Kalki praised Vijaya's performance, saying that like the film's title, she too was one in a thousand.
