= Kumari Kottam =

1971 film by P. Neelakantan

- Theatrical release poster
- Directed by: P. Neelakantan
- Screenplay by: Sornam
- Story by: V. C. Guhanathan
- Produced by: Kovai Chezhiyan
- Starring: M. G. Ramachandran; Jayalalithaa
- Cinematography: Amirtham
- Edited by: G. Kalyanasundaram
- Music by: M. S. Viswanathan
- Production company: Kay Cee Films
- Release date: 26 January 1971
- Country: India
- Language: Tamil

Kumari Kottam (/kuməri/) is a 1971 Indian Tamil-language film directed by P. Neelakantan. The film stars M. G. Ramachandran and Jayalalithaa, with Lakshmi, Sachu, S. A. Ashokan, V. K. Ramasamy, R. S. Manohar and Cho Ramaswamy in supporting roles. It was released on 26 January 1971.

== Plot ==
Somu agrees to marry his daughter to his close friend Muthaiya's son. Muthaiya has helped him in all instances. One day, he gets a letter from his late wife's cousin stating that Somu and his daughter must come to own Somu's father in law's wealth. He refuses the offer as he doesn't have money to go, Muthaiya sells his wife's jewellery to facilitate his travel. Many years later, Somu and his daughter are leading a luxurious life. Muthaiya's son Gopal enters the house as a gardener. Soon Muthaiya comes to Somu to remind him of his promise to get his daughter married to his son. But he refuses stating he is a mere gardener forgetting all the old sacrifices. Muthaiya is offended in public and attempts suicide, but is saved at the last moment by Gopal. Gopal then promises to teach a lesson to Somu and his daughter.

== Cast ==
- M. G. Ramachandran as Gopal
- Jayalalithaa as Kumari and Mayadevi
- Lakshmi as Uma
- Sachu as Singhari
- S. A. Ashokan as Sethupathi
- V. K. Ramasamy as Somu
- R. S. Manohar as Rathnam
- Muthaiyya as Muthaiya
- Cho Ramaswamy as Babu
- Karikol Raju
- Usilai Mani

== Soundtrack ==
The music was composed by M. S. Viswanathan.

Song	Singers	Lyrics	Length
"Ennamma Rani"	T. M. Soundararajan	Alangudi Somu	03:55
"Adi Maddhalam Kotti"	L. R. Eswari	Alangudi Somu	04:19
"Aaduvathu Udalukku"	L. R. Eswari	Pulamaipithan	03:12
"Vanthaan Aaiyah"	T. M. Soundararajan	Kannadasan	04:06
"Engey Aval"	T. M. Soundararajan	Pulamaipithan	03:23
"Naam Oruvarai"	T. M. Soundararajan, L. R. Eswari	Vaali	04:13

== Release and reception ==
Kumari Kottam was released on 26 January 1971. Screen criticised the photography, choreography, art direction and music, saying that "With these credits more sophisticated, the very same film would have been ten times more appealing".
