= Deiva Kuzhandhaigal =

- Poster
- Directed by: S. P. Muthuraman
- Written by: V. C. Guhanathan
- Starring: Jaishankar; R. Muthuraman; Jaya
- Cinematography: Babu
- Edited by: R. Vittal
- Music by: V. Kumar
- Production company: Victory Movies
- Release date: 14 September 1973
- Country: India
- Language: Tamil

Deiva Kuzhandhaigal (pronounced [ðeiʋakkːuɻan̪ðaɪɡaɭ] transl. Children of God) is a 1973 Indian Tamil-language drama film directed by S. P. Muthuraman and written by V. C. Guhanathan. The film stars Jaishankar, R. Muthuraman and Jaya, with Sridevi, Master Ramu and Jayaseelan in supporting roles. It was released on 14 September 1973, and failed at the box office.

== Cast ==
- Jaishankar
- R. Muthuraman
- Jaya
- Kumari Padmini
- A. Sakunthala
- Baby Sridevi
- P. R. Varalakshmi
- Master Ramu
- Jayaseelan

== Production ==
The film was launched at Bharani Studios.

== Soundtrack ==
The music was composed by V. Kumar, with lyrics by Kannadasan and Panchu Arunachalam.

Track listing
No.	Title	Singer(s)	Length
1.	"Manamulla Menmalar"	Shoba Chandrasekhar, K. Swarna, L. R. Anjali
2.	"Naan Ennathil"	P. Susheela, L. R. Eswari
3.	"Ponnulagam Vanthaalum"	P. Susheela
4.	"Yenintha Kobam"	T. M. Soundararajan

== Release and reception ==
Deiva Kuzhandhaigal was released on 14 September 1973. Kanthan of Kalki lauded the performances of Jaishankar, Jaya, Sridevi and Ramu, along with S. P. Muthuraman's direction, but criticised the performance of R. Muthuraman, and the screenplay. Navamani praised the acting, cinematography and direction. In Sridevi: The Eternal Screen Goddess (2019), Satyarth Nayak applauded Sridevi's performance in the scene where her character eulogises Indian history during a school play, and her "climactic death scene".
