= Unmaiye Un Vilai Enna? =

1976 film by Cho Ramaswamy

- Theatrical release poster
- Directed by: Cho Ramaswamy
- Written by: Cho Ramasamy
- Based on: Unmaiye Un Vilai Enna by Cho Ramaswamy
- Produced by: D.A.B.; Rana
- Starring: R. Muthuraman; Padmapriya; S. A. Ashokan; Cho Ramaswamy
- Cinematography: Sampath
- Edited by: E. V. Shanmugham
- Music by: M. S. Viswanathan
- Production company: Mohind Movies
- Release date: 30 April 1976
- Country: India
- Language: Tamil

Unmaiye Un Vilai Enna? (transl. Truth, what is your price?) is a 1976 Indian Tamil-language satirical film written and directed by Cho Ramaswamy. It is based on his stage play of the same name. Cho also stars, alongside R. Muthuraman, Padmapriya and S. A. Ashokan. The film revolves around a priest's efforts to save a young man from conviction for murder. It was released on 30 April 1976.

== Plot ==
A priest takes all possible steps to save a young man from conviction for a murder he committed to save a married woman from a womaniser. The priest stands up to his call as a minister of God and keeps to himself what the accused told him in private confession. He even hides that man from the police until he collects the necessary evidence to disclose the circumstances that led to the murder. He succeeds in his endeavour, risking his reputation, his job and eventually his life.

== Cast ==
Male cast

- R. Muthuraman as Arumainayagam
- S. A. Ashokan as Arokiasamy
- Srikanth
- Vijayakumar
- Cho Ramaswamy as Sathyanarayana

Guest appearances

- V. K. Ramasamy
- Thengai Srinivasan

Female cast

- Padmapriya as Rama
- Sakunthala
- Manorama as a journalist
- Sukumari
- Shobana
- Baby Indira
- Santhi
- Halam as a dancer

Supporting cast

- Neelu
- Heron Ramasamy
- Jayachandran

== Production ==
Unmaiye Un Vilai Enna? was a popular play staged by Cho Ramaswamy through his Viveka Fine Arts Club. The play, which also starred Neelu, was critically acclaimed, and Cho adapted it into a film under the same name, serving as director, writer and even as actor. The film adaptation was produced by D.A.B. and Rana under Mohind Movies. Cinematography was handled by Sampath, and the editing by E. V. Shanmugham. The film was launched at Vauhini Studios in September 1975, and filming took place primarily at Bangalore. Its final length was 3,948.22 metres (12,953.5 ft).

== Themes ==
According to the 1983 book Cinema as Medium of Communication in Tamil Nadu by C. R. W. David, the point of Unmaiye Un Vilai Enna? is to illustrate that "Movies have sharpened God-consciousness by emphasizing the neighbour-consciousness."

== Soundtrack ==
The soundtrack was composed by M. S. Viswanathan, with lyrics by Kannadasan.

Track listing
No.	Title	Singer(s)	Length
1.	"Ethanai Maandharukku"	M. S. Viswanathan
2.	"Kaaranathai Vilakkava"	L. R. Eswari
3.	"Paavam Seiyungal"	B. S. Sasirekha, Vani Jairam

== Release and reception ==
Unmaiye Un Vilai Enna? was released on 30 April 1976. Kanthan of Kalki lauded the film, particularly for Muthuraman's performance and Cho's writing. Naagai Dharuman of Navamani praised the acting, dialogues and direction.

== Bibliography ==
- David, C. R. W. (1983). Cinema as Medium of Communication in Tamil Nadu. Christian Literature Society. OCLC 10443988.
