= Puthiya Bhoomi =

1968 film by Tapi Chanakya

- Theatrical release poster
- Directed by: Chanakya
- Screenplay by: V. C. Guhanathan
- Produced by: P. K. V. Shankaran; Aarumugam
- Dialogue by: S. S. Thennarasu
- Starring: M. G. Ramachandran; Jayalalithaa
- Cinematography: P. N. Sundaram
- Edited by: R.Devarajan
- Music by: M. S. Viswanathan
- Production company: J. R. Movies
- Distributed by: Jayanthi Films
- Release date: 27 June 1968
- Running time: 144 minutes
- Country: India
- Language: Tamil

Puthiya Bhoomi (transl. New Earth) is a 1968 Indian Tamil-language film directed by Chanakya, starring M. G. Ramachandran and Jayalalithaa. It is a remake of the Hindi film Himalay Ki God Mein (1965). The film was released on 27 June 1968.

== Plot ==
Katheeravan is a cardiologist and heart surgeon. HIs father is an honest police officer tasked with capturing Kangeyan, a criminal whose life Katheeravan saves. When Kangeyan learns that his saviour is the son of the police officer who is out to get him, he unsuccessfully tries to kill Katheeravan. Meanwhile, Kangeyan's deputy pulls the brake lines from Katheeravan's car. Katheeravan has an accident and ends up in a village where he meets Kannamma. As Katheeravan establishes a rural clinic and a romance blossoms between him and Kannamma, the threat of Kangeyan looms over the village and Katheeravan.

== Cast ==
- M. G. Ramachandran as Katheeravan
- Jayalalithaa as Kannamma
- M. N. Nambiar as Kangeyan
- S. A. Ashokan as Mayandhi
- Nagesh as Sivamani
- T. S. Muthaiah as Veeraiya
- S. Ramarao as Vidapudi Veera Baghu
- Trichy Soundararajan as The Inspector General of Police Officer Ranga Durai
- Pandari Bai as Kathiravan's mother
- Sheela as Nalina
- Rama Prabha as Maari Kannamma's friend

== Soundtrack ==
The music was composed by M. S. Viswanathan.

Song	Singers	Lyrics	Length
"Naanthandi Kaathi"	P. Susheela, L. R. Eswari & chorus	Poovai Senguttavan	4:58 / 4:38 (film version)
"Nalina's dance" (Instrumental Piece)	M. S. Viswanathan	No Lyrics	1:16 (film version)
"Nethiyile Pottu"	P. Susheela	Kannadasan	5:28 / 4:54 (film version)
"Chinnavalai Mugam"	T. M. Soundararajan & P. Susheela	Kannadasan	4:12 / 4:16 (film version)
"Naan Ungal Veetu"	T. M. Soundararajan	Poovai Senguttavan	3:27 / 3:53 (film version)
"Vizhiye Vizhiye"	T. M. Soundararajan & P. Susheela	Kannadasan	3:38 / 5:23 (film version)

== Reception ==
Kalki negatively reviewed the film for lack of originality and newness.

== Bibliography ==
- Rajadhyaksha, Ashish; Willemen, Paul (1998) [1994]. Encyclopaedia of Indian Cinema. British Film Institute and Oxford University Press. ISBN 0-19-563579-5.
