= Sudarum Sooravaliyum =

1971 film by Puttanna Kanagal

- Poster
- Directed by: Puttanna Kanagal
- Written by: V. C. Guhanathan
- Starring: Gemini Ganesan; R. Muthuraman; Jaya Guhanathan; Vennira Aadai Nirmala
- Music by: M. S. Viswanathan
- Production company: AVM-Chitramala Combines
- Distributed by: AVM Productions
- Release date: 12 August 1971
- Country: India
- Language: Tamil

Sudarum Sooravaliyum (transl. Flame and Hurricane) is a 1971 Indian Tamil-language crime drama film directed by Puttanna Kanagal and written by V. C. Guhanathan. Jointly produced by AVM Productions and Chitramala Combines, The film stars Gemini Ganesan, R. Muthuraman, Jaya Guhanathan and Vennira Aadai Nirmala. It was released on 12 August 1971.

== Plot ==
The story revolves around a man (Gemini Ganesan) with 2 children, a son (R. Muthuraman) and a daughter (Jaya Guhanathan). Due to circumstances, the man known for his talent of imitating other people's signature, enters wrong company and forges an important signature in a bank cheque. While escaping from the police, he loses his children. Although the boy is small, he takes care of his younger sister dearly and they grow up and marry those they fall in love with. After many years, the father meets his daughter's husband and accidentally kills him, unaware that his children are still alive. Later, the father meets his children and realizes that he has killed his son-in-law. The rest of the story evolves around how the father tries to express his grief and whether or not, the children have forgiven him.

== Cast ==
- Gemini Ganesan
- R. Muthuraman
- Jaya Guhanathan
- Vennira Aadai Nirmala
- M. R. R. Vasu
- Chandra Mohan
- Thengai Srinivasan

== Production ==
Sudarum Sooravaliyum was directed by Puttanna Kanagal. It was jointly produced by AVM Productions and Chitramala Combines, while the story, screenplay and dialogues were written by V. C. Guhanathan. S. P. Muthuraman worked as associate director. Chandra Mohan's voice was dubbed by Kamal Haasan.

== Soundtrack ==
The lyrics composed by Kannadasan and the music was composed by M. S. Viswanathan.

Track listing
No.	Title	Singer(s)	Length
1.	"Anbu Vanthathu"	S. P. Balasubrahmanyam	3:29
2.	"Anubhavam Thaanae Varavendum"	T. M. Soundararajan, L. R. Eswari	3:17
3.	"Muthumani Kannanukku"	S. Janaki	3:23
4.	"Kannil Rendu Kadavul"	T. M. Soundarajan, S.Janaki.	3:38
5.	"Anbu Vanthathu"	T. M. Soundararajan, S. Janaki, L. R. Anjali	3:03
Total length:			16:50
