= Neelagiri Express =

- Theatrical release poster
- Directed by: Thirumalai–Mahalingam
- Screenplay by: Cho Ramaswamy
- Produced by: V. Arunachalam
- Starring: Jaishankar
- Cinematography: G. Vittal Rao
- Edited by: A. Paulduraisingam
- Music by: T. K. Ramamoorthy
- Production company: A. L. S. Productions
- Release date: 23 March 1968
- Running time: 120 minutes
- Country: India
- Language: Tamil

Neelagiri Express (transl. Blue Mountain Express) is a 1968 Indian Tamil-language thriller film directed by Thirumalai–Mahalingam and written by Cho Ramaswamy. The music was composed by T. K. Ramamoorthy. The film stars Jaishankar, Cho, Vijaya Nirmala and Vijaya Lalitha. It is a remake of a 1967 Malayalam film Cochin Express (1967). The film was released on 23 March 1968 and was a commercial success.

== Plot ==
A murder takes place aboard Neelagiri Express, bound for Coimbatore from Madras. Ravanan is the only passenger who is travelling with the deceased. One of Ravanan's co-passengers is a mysterious woman named Kalavathy. She takes him off the train to have food at Arakkonam Station and deliberately makes him miss the train, and then she disappears. In the meantime, a wealthy man named Sabapathy is murdered, and Ravanan becomes the prime suspect in that murder. CID Inspector Shankar is assigned the task of nabbing the murderer. He realises that Ravanan is innocent and sets out to solve the case with the help of Ravanan and eventually tracks down the murderer.

== Cast ==
- Jaishankar as CID Inspector Shankar
- S. A. Ashokan as the villain with eye-patch
- Cho Ramaswamy as Ravanan
- Vijaya Nirmala as Geetha
- Vijaya Lalitha as Kalavathy
- V. S. Raghavan as Sabapathy
- S. V. Ramadas as Boopathy
- K. Vijayan as Kumar
- S. Parvathi as Mahalakshmi
- Tambaram Lalitha as Geetha's mother
- Kallapart Natarajan
- Srividya (special appearance in the song "Thiruthani Muruga Thennava Thalaiva")
- M. Bhanumathi (special appearance in the song "Thiruthani Muruga Thennava Thalaiva")

== Soundtrack ==
The music was composed by T. K. Ramamoorthy and the lyrics were written by Kannadasan.

Song	Singers	Length
"Vallibam Oru Velli Thattu"	T. M. Soundararajan, L. R. Eswari	5:11
"Naan Kalaingan Alla"	T. M. Soundararajan, L. R. Eswari	3:56
"Thiruthani Muruga Thennava Thalaiva"	P. Susheela, Soolamangalam Rajalakshmi	4:20
"Kalyana Pennai Konjam"	P. Susheela, L. R. Eswari	4:18
"Kadavul Madhuvai Kangalil Aada"	L. R. Eswari	4:20

== Release and reception ==
Neelagiri Express was released on 23 March 1968. Kalki said the story looked like it lacked salt and pepper. Despite this, it was a commercial success.
