= Mande Gundelu =

1979 Telugu film by K. Bapayya

- Directed by: K. Bapayya
- Screenplay by: V. C. Guhanathan
- Story by: V. C. Guhanathan
- Produced by: D. Ramanaidu
- Dialogues by: Jandhyala
- Starring: Krishna; Sobhan Babu; Jayasudha; Jayaprada
- Cinematography: A. Venkat
- Edited by: Ravi
- Music by: K. V. Mahadevan
- Production company: Suresh Productions
- Release date: 5 October 1979
- Country: India
- Language: Telugu

Mande Gundelu (transl. Burning hearts) is a 1979 Indian Telugu-language drama film directed by K. Bapayya and produced by D. Ramanaidu under the banner of Suresh Movies. The film stars Krishna, Sobhan Babu, Jayasudha, and Jayaprada in lead roles. K. V. Mahadevan composed the music. The story was penned by V. C. Guhanathan, and dialogues were written by Jandhyala.

As the first multistarrer produced by Ramanaidu, the film caters to Krishna's mass image and Sobhan Babu's class appeal. Upon its release on October 5, 1979, Mande Gundelu received positive reviews and emerged as a commercial success, running for 100 days in major centres.

== Plot ==
Naga Raju is a greedy man who values wealth over morals. His family consists of his devoted wife, Meenakshi, who is pregnant, and their two young sons. Despite his familial obligations, Naga Raju engages in unethical practices to achieve his financial goals.

In contrast, Contractor Devi Prasad is a principled man. He has two young sons: Kalyan, aged five, and Mohan, aged two. During Mohan's birth, Devi Prasad’s wife, Sarada, suffers a mental breakdown and is hospitalized. Tragedy strikes when Kalyan dies in a car accident. However, Sarada regains her mental faculties around the same time. Distraught over the loss of his son and unwilling to tell his recovering wife, Devi Prasad follows the advice of Satyam, and buys a child of the same age as Kalyan to present as her own.

Simultaneously, Naga Raju, driven by greed, forcibly obtains Meenakshi's thumbprint on divorce papers and expels her from their home. He retains custody of their elder son, whom he sells to Satyam for financial gain. Meenakshi, now destitute, gives birth to a daughter, Rani, and raises her alongside her younger son, Ramu. Despite facing numerous hardships, she ensures both children receive an education. However, Meenakshi falls seriously ill and requires medical treatment, which Ramu cannot afford. In desperation, he resorts to unethical means to earn money.

Meanwhile, Kalyan, raised by Devi Prasad, excels in academics and sports, enhancing his adoptive father’s reputation. Mohan, who attends the same college as Rani, falls in love with her, further intertwining the fates of the two families.

Devi Prasad wins the contract for the tender of the Nagavali Dam, which infuriates Naga Raju. In retaliation, he partners with another unscrupulous man, Ramesh, and they plan to pollute the raw materials supplied for the dam to deceive Devi Prasad.

Ramu meets a college girl named Latha, while Kalyan meets a girl named Varalakshmi, and both couples fall deeply in love.

However, the construction of the Nagavali Dam faces a setback when it collapses in the final stages. The incident, coupled with government pressure, severely affects Devi Prasad's health, leaving him bedridden. He suspects foul play and says so to Kalyan. As he nears death, he entrusts his younger son Mohan and his assets to Kalyan, but even on his deathbed, he does not reveal the truth about Kalyan's origins.

One day, Kalyan discovers an agreement in which Satyam had bought a boy for Devi Prasad. Suspicious, Kalyan confronts Satyam, who, unable to avoid the truth, reveals that Kalyan is not Devi Prasad's biological son. Enraged by the revelation that his parents sold him for money, Kalyan grapples with his emotions. The rest of the story unfolds as Kalyan's journey to uncover the truth and reconcile with his past continues.

== Cast ==
- Krishna as Ramu
- Sobhan Babu as Kalyan
- Jayasudha as Varalakshmi
- Jayaprada as Latha
- Chandramohan as Mohan
- Madhavi as Rani
- Gummadi
- Anjali Devi
- Kaikala Satyanarayana
- Allu Ramalingaiah
- Nutan Prasad
- Kantha Rao
- Raavi Kondala Rao
- K. V. Chalam
- Sarathi
- P. L. Narayana
- P. J. Sarma
- Suryakantham

== Production ==
Mande Gundelu marked the first multistarrer produced by D. Ramanaidu under the Suresh Movies banner. Directed by K. Bapayya, the film featured an ensemble cast led by Krishna, Sobhan Babu, and Chandramohan, with Jayaprada, Jayasudha, and Madhavi as the female leads. This film marks the fourth collaboration of hero Krishna with Suresh Movies and the sixth film of Sobhan Babu under the same banner. It is also the seventh film in which both actors appeared together. It was Jayaprada’s first film under the Suresh Movies banner, while it was Jayasudha's third collaboration with the production house.

The story was written by Tamil writer V. C. Guhanathan, designed to cater to Krishna’s mass image and Sobhan Babu’s class image. Jandhyala’s dialogues added humour and wit to the script. The project also marked a rare instance where Acharya Atreya wrote lyrics for all the songs in the film.

== Music ==
The film's soundtrack was composed by K. V. Mahadevan, with lyrics by Acharya Atreya. The music played a role in the film's success.

Track list
No.	Title	Lyrics	Singer(s)	Length
1.	"Challa Challani Satyabhama"	Acharya Atreya	S. P. Balasubrahmanyam, P. Suseela
2.	"Jilu Jilu Mantunnayi Neellu"	Acharya Atreya	S. P. Balasubrahmanyam, P. Suseela
3.	"Veede Dheera Veera Soora Bheemasenudu"	Acharya Atreya	S. P. Balasubrahmanyam, P. Suseela
4.	"Idi Prema Samrajyam Idi Manmadha"	Acharya Atreya	S. P. Balasubrahmanyam, P. Suseela
5.	"Ore Kaara Veerayya Era Saara Sambayya"	Acharya Atreya	S. P. Balasubrahmanyam, P. Suseela, Madhavapeddi Ramesh
6.	"Bangaraniki Singaraniki"	Acharya Atreya	S. P. Balasubrahmanyam, P. Suseela

== Release and reception ==
Mande Gundelu was released on 5 October 1979 to positive reviews. Critics praised the performances, music, and emotional depth of the film. It was a commercial success, running for 100 days in major centres like Vijayawada, Rajahmundry, and Visakhapatnam.
