= Kanavan =

- Theatrical release poster
- Directed by: P. Neelakantan
- Screenplay by: Sornam
- Story by: M. G. Ramachandran
- Produced by: Sadayappan
- Starring: M. G. Ramachandran; Jayalalithaa
- Cinematography: V. Ramamoorthy
- Edited by: G. D. Joshi
- Music by: M. S. Viswanathan
- Production company: Valli Films
- Release date: 15 August 1968
- Running time: 152 minutes
- Country: India
- Language: Tamil

Kanavan ( transl. The Husband) is a 1968 Indian Tamil-language film, directed by P. Neelakantan, starring M. G. Ramachandran and Jayalalithaa, with C. R. Vijayakumari, S. A. Ashokan, Cho among others. It was released on 15 August 1968.

== Plot ==
Vellaiya is falsely accused of murdering a cashier named Ganapathy. Meanwhile, Rani a wealthy daughter of Chidambara Pillai, who hates marriages and wants to be freed from the humiliated Manogar, comes to see Rani after Chidambara Pillai's invitation. Manogar gets angry and insults Chidambara Pillai about Rani's behaviour. Chidambara Pillai has a heart-attack and writes a will based on Manager Mani's advise and dies. To get inheritance, Rani has to urgently marry someone. She chooses a person who is sentenced to death - the good Vellaiya. Vellaiya, though reluctant initially, marries Rani. However, due to a twist of incident, Vellaiya is acquitted at the last minute, and Vellaiya comes to settle down with his beautiful Rani. He has decide well to give her a lesson in the hardness of life.

== Cast ==
- M. G. Ramachandran as Vellaiya
- Jayalalithaa as Rani
- S. A. Ashokan as Manager Mani
- R. S. Manohar as Manogar
- Cho Ramaswamy as Advocate Vardhan
- C. R. Vijayakumari as Ponni, Velaiya's sister
- Manorama as Thenmozhi, Vardhan's wife
- Sundari Bai as Paruvadham, S. Paramasivam's wife.
- Usilai Mani as Servant
- Ennatha Kannaiya as the doctor
- T. K. S. Natarajan as Prisoner
- Shanmughasundari as Kaliyani
- S. N. Parvathy as Neighbor
- C. Vasantha as Azhagasan's wife
- Justin as Nadjappa
- S. Ramarao as Advocate S. Paramasivan B.A.B.L. Paruvadham's husband and Thenmozhi's father.
- Trichy Soundarrajan as Chidhambaram Pillai, Rani's father.
- "Sattaampillai" K. N. Venkatraman as the accountant of Chidhambaram Pilai
- K. Kannan as Azhagesan
- Thirupadhiswamy as Ponni's father-in-law
- Vijayan as a lawyer
- T. K. S. Chandran as Ponni's husband

== Production ==
The film was inspired by two narratives – the Russian novel Woodcutter and the English play The Taming of the Shrew by William Shakespeare. A scene where Vijayakumari's character's suicide attempt is stopped by a child was shot at Sathya Studios.

== Soundtrack ==
The music was composed by M. S. Viswanathan.

Song	Singers	Lyrics	Length
"Ennaporuthamadi Mama"	L. R. Eswari & chorus	Vaali	04:13
"Unmayein Siripai Rasikiraen"	T. M. Soundararajan with dialogues	Alangudi Somu	03:01
"Nan Uyir Pizhaithen"	T. M. Soundararajan	Vaali	03:43
"Adi Aathi Nee Yaruku Pethi"	T. M. Soundararajan	Alangudi Sômu	04:02
"Neenga Nenacha Nadakatha"	P. Susheela	Vaali	04:06
"Mayangum Vayathu"	T. M. Soundararajan & P. Susheela	Vaali	03:12

== Release ==
Kanavan was released on 15 August 1968. When the film was released at Madurai's Thangam Theatre, gatecrashes and stampedes occurred, leading to three casualties. The film was dubbed into Hindi as Aakhri Nishan.

== Bibliography ==
- Rajadhyaksha, Ashish; Willemen, Paul (1998) [1994]. Encyclopaedia of Indian Cinema. British Film Institute and Oxford University Press. ISBN 0-19-563579-5.
