= Thuglak =

Tamil language weekly news magazine

Thuglak (Tamil: துக்ளக்)
- Editor: Swaminathan Gurumurthy
- Former editors: Cho Ramaswamy
- Categories: News magazine
- Frequency: Weekly
- Circulation: 70000 weekly (2020)
- First issue: 14 January 1970
- Company: Bharathan Publications
- Country: India
- Based in: Chennai, Tamil Nadu
- Language: Tamil (தமிழ்)
- Website: www.thuglak.com

Thuglak (Tamil: துக்ளக்) is a Tamil language weekly news magazine. It has now expanded Digitally with an active Youtube Channel called Thuglak Digital and a X(previously known as Twitter) account also under the same page name Thuglak Digital.

== History ==
Cho Ramaswamy founded the magazine and commenced its first publication on the first day of the Tamil harvesting month "Thai" (Tamil: தை) based on the Tamil calendar system (14 January 1970). He was the editor of the magazine until his death and has penned several columns.

The name of the magazine and its mascot draws from Muhammad bin Thuglak, Sultan of Delhi, on whom in 1968, the founder staged a play and later the 1971 movie Muhammad bin Tughluq. The plot is a socio-political satire, which narrates the scheme and success of a small band of idealists who take over the Government of India as the resurrected Muhammad bin Thuglak. The founder directed and plays the lead — in the movie and the play. It was conducted under the banner of Viveka Fine Arts Club.

After Cho Ramaswamy's death, Swaminathan Gurumurthy became the editor.

Under the guidance of Swaminathan Gurumurthy, with Shri Venkateshwaran as its Chief, Thuglak has now expanded Digitally with an active Youtube Channel called Thuglak Digital and a X(previously known as Twitter) account also under the same page name Thuglak Digital.

== Highlights ==
The magazine features on its front cover a satirical cartoon, pertinent to an issue of current social and public interest.

The editor stopped publishing for two weeks, when a state of emergency was declared in India. When the publication resumed after the first two weeks of emergency, the issue was published with a black front cover. Thuglak was the only magazine in India, whose advertisements were censored during this time.

There was only other instance, later in its history, when the magazine was published with a black front was after the Babri Masjid was brought down in 1992.

== Pricing and subscription ==
The magazine is available through electronic access to readers outside of India via its website for a price of INR 900 or approximately US$20.
