= V. C. Guhanathan =

Indian director

- Born: V. Chellaiah Guhanathan; 1942 (age 83–84); Pungudutivu, Jaffna, Sri Lanka
- Occupations: Director, writer
- Years active: 1968–2006
- Spouse: Jaya

Vishwalingam Chellaiya Guhanathan is a Sri Lanka Tamil film screenwriter, director and producer who has worked on Indian Tamil films. He made his directorial debut in the 1970s, before proceeding to make successful films like Thanikattu Raja (1982) and Michael Raj (1987).

== Career ==
Guhanathan was born in Changanai, Sri Lanka to parents Chelliah and Rajeswari in a family of seven kids. He lived in Jaffna until he was eleven years old, before shifting to India. His initials VC stands for Vishwalingam Chellaiya, Vishwalingam is his grandfather's name while Chellaiya is his father's name. Guhanathan attended Pachaiyappa’s College and his writing abilities were first spotted by actor MGR, who suggested he worked on film scripts and appointed him as director Chankaya's assistant. He first worked on the script for Pudhiya Boomi (1968), aged just 17. Guhanathan later worked for AVM Studios on a contract, and proceeded to write for films starring Sivaji Ganesan, NTR and Akkineni Nageswara Rao. He also wrote Kumari Kottam. Under the advice of A. V. Meiyappan, Guhanathan debuted as a producer aged 20 under his banner of AVM Chithramala Combines and made successful films including Kanimuthu Paappa (1972), Rajapart Rangadurai (1973) and Petha Manam Pithu (1973). Telugu producer D. Ramanaidu then requested Guhanathan to direct his Tamil production, Madura Geetham (1977), and since he has gone on to make further films including ventures with Rajinikanth and Ajith Kumar. As of 2010, Guhanathan had written 249 scripts in nine Indian languages, directed 49 films in Tamil and Telugu and produced 51 films in Tamil. He is married to actress Jaya, who he had introduced through the film Kanimuthu Paappa.

In the early 2000s, Guhanathan's films began to perform less well commercially and as a result several of his films were launched and then left incomplete. This included shelved projects such as Mahajithan with Hamsavardhan, the Vivek-starrer Server Subbu, and Ethir Savaal which would have featured Vignesh and Ranjith.

In May 2009, Guhanathan was elected to the Film Employees Federation of South India and pledged to improve conditions and work closely with producers. During his reign, he oversaw issues including the 9th All India Film Employees Federation Conference in Chennai, the release of Enthiran (2010) and controversial statements made by actor Arya against the Tamil film industry. He quit in 2011 shortly after the 2011 State elections results were released and departed from his post simultaneously with Rama Narayanan who left the TFPC.

== Filmography ==
Director

Year	Film	Notes
1975	Manjal Mugame Varuga	
1977	Madhura Geetham	
1978	Machanai Paatheengala	
1978	Mangudi Minor	
1979	Muyalukku Moonu Kaal	
1980	Vanjam	
1980	Kaksha	Telugu
1982	Thanikattu Raja	
1984	Nee Thodum Pothu	
1985	Yemaatrathe Yemaaraathe	
1987	Michael Raj	
1988	Kai Naattu	
1990	Muthalali Amma	
1991	Paattondru Ketten	
1992	Mudhal Kural	
1993	Paruvu Pratistha	Telugu
1996	Minor Mappillai	
1997	Adrasakkai Adrasakkai	
1999	Manaivikku Mariyadhai	
2001	Vadagupatti Maapillai	
2005	Pethi Sollai Thattathe	
2006	Aadhikkam	

Writer

- Pudhiya Bhoomi (1968) - screenplay credits
- Naalum Therindhavan (1968)
- Annaiyum Pithavum (1969)
- Enga Mama (1970)
- Chitti Chellelu (1970; Telugu)
- Anadhai Anandhan (1970)
- Kumari Kottam (1971) - story credits
- Thangaikkaaga (1971)
- Suputhrudu (1971; Telugu)
- Sudarum Sooravaliyum (1971)
- Bikhre Moti (1971; Hindi)
- Rani Yaar Kuzhanthai (1972)
- Thaaikku Oru Pillai (1972)
- Kanimuthu Paappa (1972)
- Petha Manam Pithu (1973)
- Pasi Hrudayalu (1973; Telugu)
- Olimayamana Ethirkalam (1977)
- Ramakrishnulu (1978; Telugu)
- Chilipi Krishnudu (1978; Telugu)
- Mande Gundelu (1978; Telugu)
- Kalyana Chakravarthy (1980; Telugu)
- Aggi Ravva (1981; Telugu)
- Prema Kanuka (1981; Telugu)
- Guru Sishyulu (1981; Telugu)
- Amma (1982)
- Neethi Devan Mayakkam (1982)
- Needhiyin Nizhal (1985)
- Deivapiravi (1985)
- Dharma Devathai (1986)
- Shankar Guru (1987)
- Per Sollum Pillai (1987)
- Manithan (1987)
- Ramu (1987)
- Maduraikkara Thambi (1988)
- Ramudu Bheemudu (1988; Telugu)
- Sonthakkaran (1989)
- Penn Buddhi Mun Buddhi (1989)
- Mundhanai Sabatham (1989)
- Akka Chellelu (1993; Telugu)
- Super Police (1994; Telugu)
- Kondapalli Ratayya (1995; Telugu)
- Naidugari Kutumbam (1996; Telugu)
- Minsara Kanavu (1997)
- Divya Teacher (2001)
- Kaaviyum Aaviyum Naduvula Devi (delayed)

Producer

- Sudarum Sooravaliyum (1971)
- Petha Manam Pithu (1973)
- Deiva Kuzhandhaigal (1973)
- Rajapart Rangadurai (1973)
