= Suputhrudu =

- Theatrical release poster
- Directed by: T. Rama Rao
- Written by: Bollimuntha Sivarama Krishna (dialogues)
- Screenplay by: Mullapudi Venkata Ramana
- Story by: V. C. Guhanathan
- Produced by: Jagarlamudi Subba Rao; Gorantla Rajendra Prasad
- Starring: Akkineni Nageswara Rao; Lakshmi
- Cinematography: P. S. Selvaraj
- Edited by: K. A. Marthand
- Music by: K. V. Mahadevan
- Production company: Madhavi Combines
- Release date: 29 April 1971
- Running time: 156 minutes
- Country: India
- Language: Telugu

Suputhrudu (transl. Son) is a 1971 Indian Telugu-language drama film, produced by Jagarlamudi Subba Rao, Gorantla Rajendra Prasad on Madhavi Combines banner and directed by T. Rama Rao. It stars Akkineni Nageswara Rao, Lakshmi and music composed by K. V. Mahadevan.

== Cast ==
- Akkineni Nageswara Rao as Gopi
- Lakshmi as Madhavi
- Jaggayya as Dharmaraju
- Gummadi as Dr.Dayanidhi
- Anjali Devi as Lakshmi
- Rajanala as Nagabhushanam
- Mikkilineni as Venkata Swamy
- Dhulipala as Raghunatha Rao
- Padmanabham as Papa Rao
- Vijayachander as Ramesh
- Surabhi Balasaraswathi as Nagabhushanam's wife
- Raavi Kondala Rao
- Sakshi Ranga Rao as Gurunatham
- Perumallu as Parandhamaiah
- Kakarala as Subbaiah
- Sarathi
- Master Yerramilli Srinivas as Young Gopi

== Crew ==
- Art: G. V. Subba Rao
- Choreography: Tangappan, Chinni-Sampath
- Fights: Raghavulu
- Dialogues: Bollimuntha Sivarama Krishna
- Lyrics: Acharya Aatreya, C. Narayana Reddy, Kosaraju
- Playback: Ghantasala, P. Susheela
- Music: K. V. Mahadevan
- Story: V. C. Guhanathan
- Screenplay: Mullapudi Venkata Ramana
- Editing: K. A. Marthand
- Cinematography: P. S. Selvaraj
- Producer: Jagarlamudi Subba Rao, Gorantla Rajendra Prasad
- Director: T. Rama Rao
- Banner: Madhavi Combines
- Release Date: 29 April 1971

== Soundtrack ==
Suputhrudu

Film score by K. V. Mahadevan
- Released: 1971
- Genre: Soundtrack
- Length: 19:51
- Producer: K. V. Mahadevan

K. V. Mahadevan chronology
Dasara Bullodu (1971)	Suputhrudu (1971)	Koothuru Kodalu (1971)

Music composed by K. V. Mahadevan.

S. No.	Song title	Lyrics	Singers	length
1	"Ayyindayyo"	Kosaraju	Ghantasala, P. Susheela	4:16
2	"Bhale Manchi Chowka Beramu"	Kosaraju	Ghantasala	4:07
3	"Chilakamma Pilichindhi"	Acharya Aatreya	Ghantasala, P. Susheela	4:12
4	"Emivvanoo"	C. Narayana Reddy	Ghantasala, P. Susheela	3:17
5	"Ohoho Vayaari"	Acharya Aatreya	Ghantasala	3:59
