= Jaya Guhanathan =

Indian actress

Kalaimamani Jaya Guhanathan
- Born: Sheela; Cheranmadevi, Tirunelveli, Tamil Nadu, India
- Occupation: Actress
- Years active: 1967–1980
- Spouse: V. C. Guhanathan
- Awards: Kalaimamani Award (2022)

Jaya Guhanathan is an Indian actress of Tamil and Malayalam films. She acted for a decade. She has acted almost 100 films in variety of roles.

== Personal life ==
Jaya and V. C. Guhanathan fell in love with each other during the filming of their film, eventually got married at Arulmigu Devi Karumari Amman Temple, Tiruverkadu, Tiruvallur district. Jaya speaks Tamil fluently.

== Film career ==
Jaya started her career as child actress with Malayalam film Anweshichu Kandethiyilla and went on to do child roles in 10 Malayalam films. While furthering her studies in PUC at S.I.E.T college, Chennai, she was persuaded by V. C. Guhanathan to join films. In 1971, she was introduced in Tamil film Sudarum Sooravaliyum opposite Gemini Ganesan, R. Muthuraman and Chandra Mohan. She decided to quit acting on 1980, her last movie was Aarilirunthu Arubathu Varai.

== Awards ==
- 2022: Received title of Kalaimamani Award by the Government of Tamil Nadu, which is the highest state honour in the field of Arts

== Partial filmography ==
=== Tamil ===
Year	Film	Co-star	Role
1967	Bama Vijayam		Child artist as Baby Sheela
1971	Sudarum Sooravaliyum	Gemini Ganesan, R. Muthuraman, Chandra Mohan, Vennira Aadai Nirmala	
1972	Rani Yaar Kuzhanthai	Jaishankar, R. Muthuraman, Lakshmi	
1972	Annai Abirami	Sivakumar, K. R. Vijaya	
1972	Dheivam	Gemini Ganesan, A. V. M. Rajan, R. Muthuraman, Sivakumar, K. R. Vijaya, Sowcar Janaki	Devanai
1972	Kanimuthu Paappa	Jaishankar, R. Muthuraman, Lakshmi, Rajalakshmi	
1972	Mr. Sampath	R. Muthuraman, Cho Ramaswamy	
1973	Kasi Yathirai	V. K. Ramasamy, Srikanth	Seetha
1973	Deiva Kuzhandhaigal	Jaishankar, R. Muthuraman, Vanisri, Padmini	
1973	Iraivan Irukkindran	Jaishankar	
1973	Shanmugapriya	R. Muthuraman, Sivakumar, Jayanthi	
1973	Petha Manam Pithu	R. Muthuraman, Savitri, Jayasudha	
1973	Rajapart Rangadurai	Sivaji Ganesan, Srikanth, Ushanandini	
1974	Anbu Thangai	R. Muthuraman, Srikanth, Jayalalithaa	
1974	Magalukkaga	A. V. M. Rajan	
1974	Paadha Poojai	Sivakumar, Jayachitra	
1975	Thiruvarul	A. V. M. Rajan	
1975	Manjal Mugame Varuga	Vijayakumar, Sathyapriya	
1976	Dasavatharam	Ravikumar, Gemini Ganesan	Princess Draupadi/Panchaali
1976	Gruhapravesam	Sivaji Ganesan, Sivakumar, K. R. Vijaya	
1976	Thayilla Kuzhandhai	Vijayakumar, A. V. M. Rajan, Jayachitra, Jai Ganesh	
1976	Nalla Penmani	R. Muthuraman, Srividya, Sowcar Janaki	
1977	Navarathinam	M. G. Ramachandran	Gomaidi
1977	Bhuvana Oru Kelvi Kuri	Sivakumar, Rajinikanth, Sumithra	Raji
1977	Murugan Adimai	R. Muthuraman, Vijayakumar, A. V. M. Rajan, K. R. Vijaya	
1978	Karunai Ullam	Srikanth, Vijayakumar, K. R. Vijaya	
1978	Thai Meethu Sathiyam	Rajinikanth, Sripriya	
1979	Aarilirunthu Arubathu Varai	Rajinikanth, Fatafat Jayalaxmi, Sangeetha	

=== Malayalam: Credited as Junior Sheela ===
Year	Film	Role
1967	Ashwamedham	
1967	Anweshichu Kandethiyilla	
1968	Asuravithu	
1970	Detective 909 Keralathil	
1970	Abhayam	
1970	Anadha	
1971	Oru Penninte Katha	Sreedevi
1971	Aabhijathyam	
1971	Thettu	Mini
1972	Miss Mary	
1973	Panitheeratha Veedu	Jose's sister
1975	Bhaaryaye Aavashyamundu	
1975	Makkal	
1976	Rajayogam	
1977	Tholkan Enikku Manassilla	
1977	Guruvayur Kesavan	
1978	Eeta	

=== Telugu ===
Year	Film	Role
1972	Prajanayakudu	
1973	Pedda Koduku	
