= Michael Raj =

1987 film by V. C. Guhanathan

- Poster
- Directed by: V. C. Guhanathan
- Written by: V. C. Guhanathan
- Produced by: D. Ramanaidu
- Starring: Raghuvaran; Madhuri; Sarath Babu; Baby Shalini
- Cinematography: Dharma
- Edited by: R. T. Annadurai
- Music by: Chandrabose
- Production company: Suresh Productions
- Release date: 5 December 1987
- Running time: 130 minutes
- Country: India
- Language: Tamil

Michael Raj is a 1987 Indian Tamil-language action drama film directed by V. C. Guhanathan and produced by D. Ramanaidu. The film stars Raghuvaran and Madhuri, supported by Sarath Babu and Baby Shalini. It was released on 5 December 1987. The film was remade in Telugu as Brahma Puthrudu and in Hindi as Rakhwala with Shalini reprising her role.

== Plot ==
Michael Raj is the story of an honest man who had to take the route of action to erase the corruption and crime happening around him.

== Cast ==
- Raghuvaran as Michael Raj
- Madhuri
- Sarath Babu
- Charle
- Baby Shalini
- Senthil
- K. Rajan
- Sumithra
- Jai Ganesh
- Sathyajith
- Viji
- M. N. Rajam
- Vijayakumar
- Bayilvan Ranganathan
- Chinni Jayanth
- Rajyalakshmi

== Soundtrack ==
Soundtrack was composed by Chandrabose. All songs written by Mu. Metha.

Track listing
No.	Title	Singer(s)	Length
1.	"Thenna Mara Thoppukulle"	Malaysia Vasudevan, Vani Jairam
2.	"Kaalam Porandiruchu"	K. J. Yesudas
3.	"Jothilingam"	S. P. Sailaja
4.	"Maniyadikuthu"	Malaysia Vasudevan
5.	"Hey Dorai"	S. P. Balasubrahmanyam

== Reception ==
The Indian Express wrote, "There is crude rabblerousing with anti-rich bombast, all in keeping with the meaningless socialistic pattern(n) of filmy rhetoric".
