= V. Kumar =

- Born: 28 July 1934
- Origin: Chennai, Tamil Nadu, India
- Died: 7 January 1996 (aged 61)
- Occupations: Film score composer, music director
- Instruments: Vocals (playback singing), keyboard, harmonium, piano
- Label: Melody King

V. Kumar (Tamil: வரதராஜுலு குமார்,) (28 July 1934 – 7 January 1996) was a Tamil cinema music director. He was born in Chennai, Tamilnadu on 28 July 1934 to Varadharajulu and Dhanabhakiyam. In July 1969, he married Tamil cinema playback singer Swarna and had a son Suresh. V. Kumar is known as Mellisai MaamaNi, and was introduced to Tamil film music by K. Balachander.

He used P. Susheela and S. P. Balasubrahmanyam for many of his songs. He has been the aasthana MD for K. Balachandar films. Before that, he scored music for his Stage Dramas.

== Discography ==
Their works include music for the following movies:

Year	Film	Language	Director	Banner	Notes
1965	Neerkumizhi	Tamil	K. Balachander	Thirumalai Films	Debut Film
1965	Naanal	Tamil	K. Balachander	Saravana Pictures	
1966	Major Chandrakanth	Tamil	K. Balachander	AVM Productions	
1967	Ninaivil Nindraval	Tamil	Muktha Srinivasan	Muktha Films	
1968	Bommalattam	Tamil	Muktha Srinivasan	Muktha Films	
1968	Ethir Neechal	Tamil	K. Balachander	Kalakendra Movies	
1968	Puthisaligal	Tamil	Arun	N. A. L. Productions	
1969	Aayiram Poi	Tamil	Muktha Srinivasan	Vidhya Movies	
1969	Iru Kodugal	Tamil	K. Balachander	Kalakendra Movies	
1969	Nirai Kudam	Tamil	Muktha Srinivasan	Muktha Films	
1969	Singapore Seeman	Tamil	M. A. V. Rajendran	Swarnalakshmi Pictures	
1970	Bommalatta	Telugu	Muktha Srinivasan	Muktha Films	with Indar John Babu
1970	Navagraham	Tamil	K. Balachander	Kalakendra Movies	
1970	Patham Pasali	Tamil	K. Balachander	Alangudi Movies	
1970	Penn Deivam	Tamil	M. A. Thirumugam	Dhandayuthapani Films	
1970	Sambarala Rambabu	Telugu	K. Balachander	Sri Ramana Chitra	
1971	Nootrukku Nooru	Tamil	K. Balachander	Kalakendra Movies	
1971	Pattondru Ketten	Tamil			
1971	Rangarattinam	Tamil	Krishnan–Panju	SJ Films	
1971	Veguli Penn	Tamil	S. S. Devadoss	Jennat Combines	
1972	Appa Tata	Tamil	Malliyam Rajagopal	Sri Venkateswara Production	
1972	Collector Janaki	Telugu	S. S. Balan	Sri Padmanabha Pictures	
1972	Deiva Sankalpam	Tamil	P. R. Somu	Sri Padmanabha Pictures	
1972	Delhi To Madras	Tamil	I. N. Murthy	Sri Raji Movies	
1972	Mappillai Azhaippu	Tamil	T. R. Raghunath	Om Murugan Movies	
1972	Unakkum Enakkum	Tamil	N. S. Maniam	Geetha Chitra Productions	
1972	Velli Vizha	Tamil	K. Balachander	Kalakendra Movies	
1973	Arangetram	Tamil	K. Balachander	Kalakendra Movies	
1973	Deiva Kuzhandhaigal	Tamil	S. P. Muthuraman	Victor Movies	
1973	Kattila Thottila	Tamil	Malliyam Rajagopal	Arul Films	
1973	Malligai Poo	Tamil	N. S. Maniam	Geethalayaa Productions	
1973	Pennai Nambungal	Tamil	B. V. Srinivasan	Suchithra Films	
1973	Petha Manam Pithu	Tamil	S. P. Muthuraman	Victor Movies	
1973	Ponvandu	Tamil	N. S. Maniam	Maniam Pictures	
1973	Yesu Prabhuvu	Telugu	P. A. Thomas	Universal Pictures	
1974	Avalukku Nigar Avale	Tamil	Madurai Thirumanam	Sri Ravipriya Films	
1974	Avalum Penn Thaane	Tamil	Durai	Sri Panduranga Productions	
1974	Kaliyuga Kannan	Tamil	Krishnan–Panju	Ajantha Enterprises	
1974	Kannavari Kalalu	Telugu	S. S. Balan		
1974	Onne Onnu Kanne Kannu	Tamil	Ra. Sankaran	Sudharshan Enterprises	
1974	Raja Nagam	Tamil	N. S. Manian	Jagajothi Pictures	
1974	Swathi Nakshathram	Tamil	K. S. Gopalakrishnan	Ashok Pictures	
1974	Sthree Gowravam	Telugu	S. S. Devadas	Radha Madhav Movies	
1974	Thaai Pasam	Tamil	B. V. Srinivasan	Suchithra Films	
1975	Aayirathil Oruthi	Tamil	Avinashi Mani	K. R. G. Pictures	
1975	Andharu Manchivare	Telugu	S. S. Balan	Gemini Studios	
1975	Ellorum Nallavare	Tamil	S. S. Balan	Gemini Studios	
1975	Ezhaikkum Kaalam Varum	Tamil	S. Rajendra Babu	Saradha Combines	
1975	Karotti Kannan	Tamil	R. Pattu	Ajantha Enterprises	
1975	Kasthuri Vijayam	Tamil	P. Madhavan	Devanayaki Films	
1975	Then Sindhudhe Vaanam	Tamil	Ra. Sankaran	Sudarsan Enterprises	
1975	Thyaga Ullam	Tamil	R. Pattabiraman		
1975	Unga Veettu Kalyanam	Tamil	K. Krishnamurthy	Sri Chitra Mahal Productions	
1976	Asai 60 Naal	Tamil	Durai	Sri Uma Chitra Productions	
1976	Athirshtam Azhaikirathu	Tamil	A. Jagannathan	J. M. Productions	
1976	Ithu Ivargalin Kathai	Tamil	T. P. Arunachalam	Vinu Chitra Arts	
1976	Janaki Sabadham	Tamil	Avinashi Mani	K. R. G. Pictures	
1976	Kanavan Manaivi	Tamil	A. Bhimsingh	Sree Umachithra Combines	
1976	Mittai Mummy	Tamil	Avinashi Mani	Rasi Productions	
1976	Nalla Pennmani	Tamil	A. Jagannathan	S. V. J. Pictures	
1976	Panakkara Penn	Tamil	U. Rajendran	Thiruthani Pictures	
1977	Andru Sinthiya Ratham	Tamil	R. Sundaram	Geetha Chitra	
1977	Chakravarthy	Tamil	Krishnan–Panju	P. V. T. Productions	
1977	Oruvanukku Oruthi	Tamil	Ra. Sankaran	Babu Movies	
1977	Sonnathai Seiven	Tamil	Krishnan–Panju	Geetha Arts	
1977	Sonthamadi Nee Enakku	Tamil	S. P. Muthuraman	Jai Geetha Productions	
1977	Thoondil Meen	Tamil	Ra. Sankaran	Sudarsan Enterprises	
1978	Annapoorani	Tamil	Krishnan–Panju	Vijayambika Films	
1978	Ival Oru Seethai	Tamil	A. Jagannathan	Welcome Movies	
1978	Kannammoochi	Tamil	R. Pattabiraman	Sri Balambika Productions	
1978	Makkal Kural	Tamil	U. Rajendran	Thiruthani Pictures	
1978	Sadhurangam	Tamil	Durai	Chandra Arts	
1978	Unakkum Vaazhvu Varum	Tamil	G. Srinivasan	Ashapriya Productions	
1979	Alangari	Tamil	Chithralaya Gopu	Durga Bagavathy Films	
1979	Nadagame Ullagam	Tamil	Krishnan–Panju	Vijayambika Films	
1979	Nangooram	Tamil	Timothy Weeraratne	Lankal Films	
1980	Inaindha Dhuruvangal	Tamil	K. S. Gopalakrishnan	Vohra Films	
1980	Mangala Nayagi	Tamil	Krishnan–Panju	J. C. Chowdry Arts	
1981	Kalam Oru Naal Maarum	Tamil	N. A. Panneer Selvam	Saroj Films	
1981	Kannadi	Tamil	M. A. Kaja	Senthil Creations	
1983	Aval Oru Kaviyam	Tamil	Durai	Sri Sivalayaa Films	
1984	Shankari	Tamil	T. R. Ramanna	Revathi Combines	
1985	Mahanagaramlo Mayajalam	Telugu			
1986	Malarum Ninaivugal	Tamil	Krishnan–Panju	Meenakshi Films	
1987	Meendum Mahaan	Tamil	Uthaman	Rathnam Cine Arts	
1990	Enakkoru Neethi	Tamil	K. S. Gopalakrishnan	Anil Creations	
1991	Naan Oru Malaysian	Tamil	Suhan Panchacharam	Berjaya Film Productions	Malaysian Film
