= Annapoorani (1978 film) =

- Theatrical release poster
- Directed by: Krishnan–Panju
- Screenplay by: Vietnam Veedu Sundaram (dialogues)
- Story by: Selvabharathi
- Starring: K. R. Vijaya; R. Muthuraman
- Cinematography: C. S. Ravibabu
- Edited by: Panjabi; Ramalingam
- Music by: V. Kumar
- Production company: Vijayambika Films
- Release date: 4 August 1978
- Country: India
- Language: Tamil

Annapoorani is a 1978 Indian Tamil-language film directed by Krishnan–Panju. Vietnam Veedu Sundaram wrote the screenplay, based on a story by Selvabharathi. The film stars K. R. Vijaya and R. Muthuraman, with Srikanth, Major Sundarrajan and Cho in supporting roles. It was released on 4 August 1978.

== Cast ==
- K. R. Vijaya
- R. Muthuraman
- Srikanth
- Major Sundarrajan
- Cho
- Jayachandran
- Ramkumar
- R. K. Raman
- S. R. Gopalakrishnan
- Neelu
- Desikan
- Dhanapal
- Pasupathi
- Sukumari
- Manorama
- Sathyapriya
- Shoba
- Swathi
- Baby Jayashanti
- Baby Kalaivani
- Baby Vandhana

== Soundtrack ==
The music was composed by V. Kumar, with lyrics by Vaali. The song "Unnai Paarkavendum" attained popularity.

Track listing
No.	Title	Singer(s)	Length
1.	"Kannanukku Kobamenna"	P. Susheela, K. J. Yesudas
2.	"Iyirandu Thingalile"	P. Susheela
3.	"Unnai Paarkavendum"	K. J. Yesudas
4.	"Naanum Oru Seettukattu"	S. Janaki

== Critical reception ==
Kausigan of Kalki appreciated the performance of Vijaya and Cho's humour but felt Sundaram's dialogues lacked his signature touch and in regards to Krishnan–Panju's direction he felt how can the feast be good if the ingredients and utensils bought for feast are not perfect and no use of pointing out the cook. Anna praised the acting of cast, music, dialogues and direction but felt despite having huge scope both Vijaya and Muthuraman did not have major scenes to prove their acting prowess and also felt unnecessary political dialogues could have been trimmed.
