= Tholkan Enikku Manassilla =

- Directed by: Hariharan
- Written by: S. L. Puram Sadanandan
- Produced by: G. P. Balan
- Starring: Prem Nazir; Jayabharathi; Soman, Jayan; Bahadoor; Junior Sheela
- Music by: Shankar–Ganesh
- Production company: GP Films
- Distributed by: GP Films
- Release date: 9 December 1977
- Country: India
- Language: Malayalam

Tholkan Enikku Manassilla is a 1977 Indian Malayalam film, directed by Hariharan and produced by G. P. Balan. The film stars Prem Nazir, Jayabharathi, Bahadoor and Junior Sheela in the lead roles. The film has musical score by Shankar–Ganesh.

== Cast ==
- Prem Nazir
- Jayabharathi
- Bahadoor
- Junior Sheela
- K. P. Ummer
- M. G. Soman
- Jayan
- Master Raghu

== Soundtrack ==
The music was composed by Shankar–Ganesh.

No.	Song	Singers	Lyrics	Length (m:ss)
1	"Ponvilayum Kaadu"	P. Jayachandran, Ambili	Mankombu Gopalakrishnan	
2	"Subhamangalodayam"	K. J. Yesudas	Mankombu Gopalakrishnan	
3	"Tholkkaan Orikkalum"	K. J. Yesudas	Mankombu Gopalakrishnan	
4	"Vasundhara"	P. Susheela	Mankombu Gopalakrishnan	
5	"Vayanaadin Maanam"	Vani Jayaram	Mankombu Gopalakrishnan	
