= Nirai Kudam =

8 August 1969 Indian film

- Poster
- Directed by: Muktha Srinivasan
- Screenplay by: Cho
- Story by: Mahendran
- Produced by: Muktha Ramaswamy
- Starring: Sivaji Ganesan; Vanisri
- Cinematography: M. Karnan
- Edited by: L. Balu
- Music by: V. Kumar
- Production company: Muktha Films
- Release date: 8 August 1969
- Country: India
- Language: Tamil

Nirai Kudam (transl. Full Pitcher) is a 1969 Indian Tamil-language film, directed by Muktha Srinivasan and produced by his elder brother V. Ramasamy. The film stars Sivaji Ganesan and Vanisri. It was released on 8 August 1969.

== Plot ==
Prabakar and Chitra are medical students who fall in love. However, their lives turn upside down when Chitra loses her eyesight and her brother due to a prank played by Prabakar.

== Cast ==
- Sivaji Ganesan as Prabhakar/Dr. Babu
- Vanisri as Chithra
- R. Muthuraman as Sampath
- Major Sundarrajan as Madhanagopal
- V. K. Ramasamy as Appadurai
- Cho as Giri
- Manorama as Girija
- Thengai Srinivasan as Professor
- Sachu as Hema
- M. Bhanumathi as Chithra College Friend
- Kathadi Ramamurthy as cooking master
- Veerasamy as Madhanagopal Ungel
- G. Sakunthala as Girija's unty

== Production ==
Nirai Kudam is the first film for Sivaji Ganesan with Muktha Films. He also helped Vanisri in portraying her blind character.

== Soundtrack ==
The soundtrack was composed by V. Kumar, with lyrics by Kannadasan.

Song	Singers	Length
"Deva Deva"	T. M. Soundararajan, P. Susheela, Soolamangalam Rajalakshmi & K. Jamuna Rani	05:50
"Kannoru Pakkam"	T. M. Soundararajan, P. Susheela	03:38
"Vilakke Nee Konda"	T. M. Soundararajan	03:57
