= Kani Nilam =

- Directed by: Arunmozhi
- Written by: Cho (dialogues)
- Screenplay by: Arunmozhi
- Story by: Cho
- Produced by: Palayamkottai Shanmugam
- Starring: Cho
- Cinematography: Arunmozhi
- Edited by: R. T. Annadurai
- Music by: Arunmozhi
- Production company: Latha Creations
- Release date: 14 August 1987
- Country: India
- Language: Tamil

Kani Nilam (pronounced [kaːɳi n̪ilam] transl. A Piece of Land) is a 1987 Indian Tamil-language political satire film directed by Arunmozhi, starring Cho. It was released on 14 August 1987.

== Cast ==
- Cho as Arivarasan
- Kutty Padmini as the reporter
- Vathiyar Raman as Nagalingam
- Nassar

== Production ==
The title of the film was originally Kani Nilam Vendum (transl. Wanted, a Piece of Land). The censor board initially refused to certify the film because of its negative portrayal of politicians (which the board believed would lead to anti-government beliefs), and many derogatory references to politicians based in Tamil Nadu. After the film faced three months of limbo, it was cleared by the board with a U certificate after 18 cuts. According to Cho, however, the film was not meant to defame or vilify anyone: "It only shows corruption at the political level seeping down to the grassroots".

== Release and reception ==
Kani Nilam was released on 14 August 1987. Nandalala of The Indian Express wrote the film "proves to be somewhat of a letdown [...] the end product is a slipshod patchwork which will not cut ice either with the groundlings or with the more discerning". Jayamanmadhan of Kalki also gave the film a negative review, saying innovative angles, neat editing and gripping direction were missing. The film was later selected for screening at the Pan African Film Festival.
