= Aayiram Poi =

1969 film by Muktha Srinivasan

- Poster
- Directed by: Muktha Srinivasan
- Written by: Cho
- Based on: Yaaro Ivar Yaaro by Cho
- Produced by: M. Venu Goopal; V. Ramasamy (supervisor)
- Starring: Jaishankar; Vanisri
- Cinematography: Amirtham
- Edited by: L. Balu
- Music by: V. Kumar
- Production company: Vidhya Movies
- Release date: 11 July 1969
- Running time: 161 minutes
- Country: India
- Language: Tamil

Aayiram Poi (transl. A Thousand Lies) is a 1969 Indian Tamil-language comedy film, directed by Muktha Srinivasan and written by Cho. It is based on Cho's novel Yaaro Ivar Yaaro. The film stars Jaishankar, Vanisri, Cho and Manorama. It was released on 11 July 1969.

== Plot ==
Chinna Durai dislikes his brother-in-law Kanagasabi, and stands in the way of a marriage arrangement for his daughter Malathy and Kanagasabi's son Ravi. Both the boy and the girl are keen on marrying each other. The film deals with how Ravi's resourcefulness helps him get Malathi's hand in marriage.

== Cast ==
- Jaishankar as Ravi
- Vanisri as Malathi
- Cho as Muthu
- Manorama as Lilly
- Shylashri as Latha
- V. S. Raghavan as Kanagasabai
- Tambaram Lalitha as Kalyani
- V. K. Ramasamy as Chinna Durai
- P. K. Saraswathy as Parvathi
- T. P. Muthulakshmi as Maragatham
- Thengai Srinivasan as Thanikachalam
- M. R. R. Vasu as Ethiraj
- V. Gopalakrishnan as Singaram
- Senthamarai as Raja
- Neelu as Neelakanda Sasthri (cameo appearance)
- Pakoda Kadhar as Ward boy

== Production ==
Aayiram Poi is the feature film debut of Neelu, previously a theatre actor. The film's title references the Tamil proverb, "Aayiram Poiyai Solliyaavadhu Oru Kalyanathai Pannu" (At least tell a thousand lies to make a marriage work). It is based on Yaaro Ivar Yaaro, a novel written by Cho and serialised in the magazine Kalki.

== Soundtrack ==
Music was by V. Kumar and lyrics were written by Kannadasan.

Song	Singer	Length
"Kaveri Thanniyil Kulichavadi"	Manorama, L. R. Eswari	04:23
"Pulavar Sonnathum Poiye"	T. M. Soundararajan, P. Susheela	03:45
"Thillaiyile Sabapathi Chithambarathil"	P. Susheela	03:32
"Thamizh Vidu Thoothu"	Tharapuram Soundararajan, Manorama	04:06

== Release and reception ==
Aayiram Poi was released on 11 July 1969. The Indian Express wrote, "The picture suffers from uneven stress. And it is too long to sustain the humour or the suspense" but praised the absence of vulgarity.
