= Thani Kudithanam =

- Theatrical release poster
- Directed by: S. A. Kannan
- Screenplay by: Vietnam Veedu Sundaram
- Based on: Thani Kudithanam by Marina
- Starring: K. R. Vijaya; Cho
- Music by: M. S. Viswanathan
- Production company: Srishanmugamani Films
- Release date: 4 March 1977
- Country: India
- Language: Tamil

Thani Kudithanam (transl. Separate family setup) is a 1977 Indian Tamil-language comedy drama film directed by S. A. Kannan. The film stars K. R. Vijaya and Cho, with Y. G. Mahendran, Pandari Bai and Major Sundarrajan in supporting roles. It is based on the play of the same name by Marina. The film was released on 4 March 1977.

== Cast ==
- K. R. Vijaya
- Cho
- Major Sundarrajan
- Pandari Bai
- Y. G. Mahendran
- Sangeetha

== Production ==
Thani Kudithanam was based on the play of the same name by Marina. The film adaptation was directed by S. A. Kannan. The screenplay was written by Vietnam Veedu Sundaram.

== Soundtrack ==
The soundtrack was composed by M. S. Viswanathan.

Track listing
No.	Title	Lyrics	Singer(s)	Length
1.	"Oru Asadattam"	Vaali	P. Susheela
2.	"Pushparagam"	Vaali	S. P. Balasubrahmanyam, L. R. Eswari
3.	"Nokkum Nekkum"	Kannadasan	P. Susheela, Saibaba, K. Veeramani

== Release and reception ==
Thani Kudithanam was released on 4 March 1977. Kanthan of Kalki felt the film adaptation completely distorted the source play.
