= Yarukkum Vetkam Illai =

- Theatrical release poster
- Directed by: Cho Ramaswamy
- Written by: Cho Ramaswamy
- Based on: Yarukkum Vetkam Illai by Cho Ramaswamy
- Produced by: A. Sundaram
- Starring: Jayalalithaa; Srikanth; Cho Ramaswamy
- Music by: G. K. Venkatesh
- Production company: Narmada Arts
- Release date: 13 June 1975
- Country: India
- Language: Tamil

Yarukkum Vetkam Illai (transl. No one is Ashamed) is a 1975 Indian Tamil-language film, written and directed by Cho Ramaswamy. The film stars Jayalalithaa in the lead role, opposite Srikanth, supported by Cho, Manorama and Sivakumar. It is based on the play by the same name written by Cho. The film was released on 13 June 1975.

== Cast ==
- Jayalalithaa
- Srikanth
- Cho Ramaswamy
- Manorama
- Sivakumar
- Sukumari

== Themes ==
The film revolves around the "hypocrisy of society on prostitution".

== Soundtrack ==
The music was composed by G. K. Venkatesh. The title song by Yesudas questions "the double standards laid in society for men and women" and "Anaiyaatha Deepam" raises questions about "morality, religion and humanitarianism".

Track listing
No.	Title	Singer(s)	Length
1.	"Anaiyaatha Deepam"	P. Susheela
2.	"En Kann Irandum Seitha"	S. Janaki
3.	"Oorukkum Vetkamillai"	K. J. Yesudas

== Accolades ==
Jayalalithaa won the Tamil Nadu State Film Award for Best Actress.

== Production ==
Initially, Jayalalitha denied to act in this film. Following the unsuccessful attempts to cast Lakshmi in lead role, Cho convinced Jayalalitha to act in this movie .
