= Annapurna Rural Municipality =

Annapurna Rural Municipality may refer to:

- Annapurna Rural Municipality, Kaski, a rural municipality in Kaski District of Nepal
- Annapurna Rural Municipality, Myagdi, a rural municipality in Myagdi District of Nepal
