= Swaminathan Gurumurthy =

Indian activist (born 1949)

S. Gurumurthy
- Occupations: Chartered accountant Editor of a weekly magazine (Thuglak); One of the Reserve Bank of India board of directors

Swaminathan Gurumurthy (born 1949) is the current editor of the Tamil political weekly magazine Thuglak. Additionally, Gurumurthy serves as a part-time director on the central board of the Reserve Bank of India (RBI).

Gurumurthy is considered one of the most widely recognised ideologues of the Rashtriya Swayamsevak Sangh (RSS) organisation. Furthermore, he is a chartered accountant by profession and serves as the co-convenor of the RSS affiliate Swadeshi Jagran Manch.

== Personal life ==
Gurumurthy was born to a Tamil family at Panampattu, Villupuram, South Arcot District (Madras Presidency).

== Activism ==
He is considered one of the most influential and highly respected Hindu nationalist ideologues; however, he has stated on multiple occasions that he is not interested in electoral politics, based on the inputs from Swami Chandrasekharendra Saraswati.

Among others, Gurumurthy has been credited with exposing the aggressive corporate expansion of Indian billionaire businessman Dhirubhai Ambani, while believing Ambani's business practices were generally negatively affecting the country's population. Ramnath Goenka entrusted Gurumurthy with fighting, investigating, and exposing Reliance Industries' unfair business practices, corruption, tax evasion, and other illegal activities. Gurumurthy's articles in The Indian Express created a stir in the corporate world as they revealed and publicly denounced a culture of widespread corruption within the troubled conglomerate. India Today magazine ranked him as the 30th most powerful person in India on its 2017 list of the country's 50 most influential individuals.

He has written several articles in The New Indian Express, highlighting the disadvantages of globalisation. His articles espoused the mission of the Swadeshi Jagran Manch and the RSS as well as an uncompromising commitment to India's unity.

He was the subject of media coverage when he publicly accused two then-senior Indian bureaucrats of being American moles. He indirectly named them in the New Indian Express article titled, "US plots Gujral-Sharif show" dated 20 September 1997. Later, in his article "Not one mole, Mr Prime Minister and Mr Jaswant, but Two!" dated 27 July 2006, he explicitly named Dr. V S Arunachalam and Naresh Chandra Saxena as the two moles.

Gurumurthy has been a regular columnist at The New Indian Express.

== Politics ==
Gurumurthy has never contested any election. In the 2014 Indian General Election, another person, a namesake of Gurumurthy who spelled his name differently ("S Gurumoorthy"), was chosen by the Bharatiya Janata Party as its candidate in the Nilgiris parliamentary constituency in Tamil Nadu. Gurumurthy denied that he was the candidate in the Nilgiris district through tweets and interviews. The 4 September 2014 issue of The Hindu carried a news item titled, "Baffled by the unexpected spotlight," in which it was written, "First his friends called to congratulate him for contesting from Nilgiris Lok Sabha Constituency. Even as he explained that he was not in the fray, another round of calls came on Monday from many who wondered why his nomination papers were rejected. Gurumurthy, Chartered Accountant and columnist, was baffled when his photo was flashed on some television channels, which claimed that he was the BJP's candidate in the Nilgiris constituency." On 8 April 2014, The New Indian Express published a clarification, "1 Name, 2 Persons, Too Many Queries", describing various news channels' faux pás mentioning chartered accountant S. Gurumurthy as the candidate who was disqualified from Nilgiris.

=== Influence on the AIADMK ===
In a tweet published in December 2017, Gurumurthy referred to Chief Minister Edappadi K. Palaniswami and Deputy Chief Minister O. Panneerselvam as "impotent leaders" for their action against the supporters of T. T. V. Dhinakaran, when All India Anna Dravida Munnetra Kazhagam lost the Radhakrishnan Nagar Assembly constituency Polls. Later, he said he had used the term "impotent" in a political context. Tamil Nadu Fisheries Minister D. Jayakumar said he would take legal action against Gurumurthy, if necessary, for his grossly offensive views.

Gurumurthy fuelled a controversy in November 2019 when he claimed in a speech that he was the one who ignited revolt in the AIADMK party, which prompted Tamil Nadu Deputy Chief Minister O. Panneerselvam to carry out 'dharmayudham' (a war for justice) after Jayalalitha's passing in 2017. Gurumurthy also revealed that he told O. Panneerselvam that he was not "man enough" to take on V. K. Sasikala's faction after J. Jayalalithaa's death. He continued to criticise the ruling government of AIADMK, calling it "a gang of robbers. This received him criticism from the AIADMK. Later, he clarified that he only said that why the AIADMK workers were so spineless for prostrating at Sasikala's feet. This created yet another round of criticisms.

=== Rajinikanth's politics ===
Gurumurthy was also known as Rajinikanth's 'advisor', has been known to be as someone who pushed for Rajinikanth to join politics. A political analyst said, "It was Gurumurthy who wanted Rajinikanth in politics more than Rajinikanth himself. The long-term plan was to make way for a non-Dravidian party option and create a vote bank for the BJP." After Rajinikanth announced that he would not be joining politics due to health complications, Gurumurthy stated that Rajinikanth would still make a 'political impact' in the 2021 Tamil Nadu Assembly elections.

== Legal issues ==
=== March 2018 Court contempt case ===
In March 2018, a division bench of the Delhi High Court headed by Justice S. Muralidhar granted interim protection from arrest to Karti Chidambaram, son of senior Congress leader P. Chidambaram, in the INX Media case. Following the order, S. Gurumurthy posted tweets falsely claiming that Justice S. Muralidhar had previously worked as a junior to Senior Advocate P. Chidambaram. Justice Muralidhar clarified in open court the following day that he had never been P. Chidambaram’s junior. Gurumurthy subsequently deleted the tweet. The Delhi High Court termed Gurumurthy's tweets "mischievous".

The Delhi High Court Bar Association (DHCBA) filed a criminal contempt petition against Gurumurthy in 2018, and the court issued a formal contempt notice in October 2018. On July 13, 2023, S. Gurumurthy appeared in person before a division bench and tendered an unconditional apology and expressed "deep remorse" for the 2018 post. The division bench accepted the apology and formally discharged him from the criminal contempt proceedings.

=== October 2018 Court contempt case ===
The Delhi High Court initiated criminal contempt proceedings against S. Gurumurthy after he retweeted a blog post that claimed bias and questioned the integrity of Justice S. Muralidhar on October 2018. The judge had quashed the transit remand and house arrest order of activist Gautam Navlakha in the Bhima Koregaon case. In October 2019, the Delhi High Court accepted Gurumurthy's apology and removed his name from the list of respondents.

=== 2021 Remarks on judiciary ===
On January 14, 2021, While responding to a reader's question, Gurumurthy stated that all judges in the High Courts and the Supreme Court were appointed by politicians. He alleged that many fell at the feet of powerful figures through intermediaries to secure judicial appointments. He added that if judicial appointments had been strictly based on merit, this issue would not have arisen. Following criticism from the legal community, Gurumurthy issued a public clarification on Twitter expressing regret, stating that he had misspoken during an extempore reply and intended to refer to "candidates for judges" rather than sitting judges.

Advocates subsequently filed applications seeking consent under the Contempt of Courts Act, 1971, to initiate criminal contempt proceedings against Gurumoorthy for scandalizing the judiciary. In March 2021, Advocate General Vijay Narayan rejected the consent plea under Section 15(1)(b) of the Contempt of Courts Act, 1971, noting Gurumurthy's apology and explanation. In September 2021, the subsequent Advocate General, R. Shunmugasundaram, recalled the earlier rejection order and granted consent to initiate contempt proceedings. Gurumurthy challenged the recall order in the Madras High Court, which set aside the Advocate General's consent order on October 2023.

== In the media ==
Gurumurthy created a controversy when he said that only 30% of women are feminine in India during a speech at a hospital in Chennai in August 2019. He also said that femininity has diminished in the present-day women, and the number of feminine women in India has decreased; women who are not feminine have become more feminine. He also stated women in femininity are like deities, and he cannot accept women who are not feminine as deities. The speech received a wide range of criticism. The All India Democratic Women's Association protested in Puliyakulam against him for his comments on women.

Gurumurthy used the Tamil phrase "Kazhisadai" (transl. scum/filth) to refer to government bank staff in a derogatory manner at Thuglak magazine's anniversary event in Chennai in May 2022. His remarks drew criticism from a number of leaders of opposition, bank officials, and bank unions, including the RBI employees union. The All India Bank Employees Association (AIBEA) called for his dismissal from the RBI's board.
