= Annapurna FM =

Radio station in Nepal

Radio Annapurna is an FM radio station that broadcasts out of Pokhara, Nepal on 93.4 MHz. It is popular among people in Pokhara city and around the western region. It broadcasts for 19 hours a day (5 am to 12 midnight).
