= Onne Onnu Kanne Kannu =

- Title card
- Directed by: Ra. Sankaran
- Screenplay by: Ra. Sankaran
- Story by: D. V. Narasa Raju
- Produced by: V. C. Ganesan
- Starring: Sivakumar; Jayachitra
- Cinematography: K. S. Bhaskar Rao
- Edited by: M. Umanath; M. Mani
- Music by: V. Kumar
- Production company: Sudarsan Enterprises
- Release date: 24 May 1974
- Country: India
- Language: Tamil

Onne Onnu Kanne Kannu is a 1974 Indian Tamil-language comedy drama film directed by Ra. Sankaran in his debut. The film stars Sivakumar and Jayachitra, with Cho, Manorama, Srikanth, Suruli Rajan and V. S. Raghavan in supporting roles. It was released on 24 May 1974.

== Cast ==
- Sivakumar as Ramu
- Jayachitra as Seetha
- Cho
- Manorama
- Srikanth
- Suruli Rajan
- V. S. Raghavan
- Rajapandian
- Delhi Kumar as Paramasivam
- Pandari Bai
- S. N. Lakshmi
- Achacho Chitra
- Vijaya Chandrika
- Samikannu
- Oru Viral Krishna Rao
- Master Ramu

== Production ==
Onne Onnu Kanne Kannu is the directorial debut of Sankaran, previously an associate director under Puttanna Kanagal. Sivakumar revealed he accepted to do this film during the time of Ponnukku Thanga Manasu (1973) whose success encouraged him to decide to take up only lead roles.

== Soundtrack ==
The music was composed by V. Kumar, with lyrics by Vaali.

Track listing
No.	Title	Singer(s)	Length
1.	"Kannellam"	Swarna, S. P. Balasubrahmanyam
2.	"Paal Manam poo Manam"	P.Susheela,S.P.Balasubrahmanyam
3.	"Sambonnu"	Rajesh, Manorama

== Critical reception ==
Navamani praised the acting of the cast, the humour and the dialogues. Kanthan of Kalki praised the performances of cast, humour and cinematography and noted since director Sankaran tried to do a full-length comedy film, the plot can be forgiven and though the film is not that worthy to appreciate, it becomes one amongst the list of films.
