= Nangooram =

- Poster
- Directed by: Timothy Weeraratne
- Written by: Pinnai Panneerselvam (dialogue)
- Story by: Jayakumar
- Produced by: Lankal Murugesu
- Starring: Muthuraman; Lakshmi; Vijaya Kumaratunga
- Cinematography: Timothy Weeraratne
- Edited by: B. Kandasamy
- Music by: V. Kumar; Premasiri Khemadasa
- Production company: Lankal Films
- Release date: 30 November 1979
- Running time: 136 minutes
- Countries: India; Sri Lanka
- Language: Tamil

Nangooram (transl. Anchor) is a 1979 Tamil-language film directed by Timothy Weeraratne. The film stars R. Muthuraman, Lakshmi and Vijaya Kumaratunga. It was released on 30 November 1979. This film was a joint collaboration between India and Sri Lanka.

== Cast ==
Male cast

- Muthuraman as Vinoth
- Vijaya Kumaratunga as Ananth
- V. S. Raghavan
- Suruli Rajan
- Ceylon Manohar
- Master Sekar as Gopi
- Thillai Rajan
- Madhukumar
- Kalaichelvan
- M. M. Latiff
- Bala

Female cast

- Lakshmi as Radha
- Fareena Lye as Shanti
- Vasantha as Alamu
- Janita as Meena
- Sabita as Latha

== Production ==
The film was produced by Lankal Murugesu and was directed by Timothy Weeraratne. Jayakumar wrote the story while the dialogues were penned by Pinnai Panneerselvam. Cinematography was in charge of Timothy Weeraratne while the operative cameramen were V. Suresh and Lalith. Editing was done by B. Kandasamy, A. Ramasamy was in charge of art direction. Still photography was done by Priyalal and Praveenkumar. The film was shot at Sathya and AVM Studios and was processed at Prasad Colour Lab. The songs were picturised at Nuveria at Sri Lanka and Marina Beach and AVM Garden at Chennai.

== Soundtrack ==
The music was composed by V. Kumar and Premasiri Khemadasa. The lyrics were penned by Kannadasan.

Track listing
No.	Title	Singer(s)	Length
1.	"Aalayam Naayagan"	S. P. Balasubrahmanyam, S. Janaki	3:38
2.	"Illai Illai Illaiye"	S. P. Balasubrahmanyam, Swarna	3:27
3.	"Kadhirvel Nayagane"	Vani Jairam	4:21
4.	"Oru Paarvai Paarkumpodhu"	S. P. Balasubrahmanyam, Swarna	4:22
Total length:			15:48

== Critical reception ==
Kausikan of Kalki felt the film did not have much of a story but praised the songs and cinematography.
