= Kanimuthu Paappa =

1972 film by S. P. Muthuraman

- Poster
- Directed by: S. P. Muthuraman
- Screenplay by: G. Balasubramaniam
- Story by: V. C. Guhanathan
- Produced by: S. Subramaniya Reddiyar
- Starring: Jaishankar; R. Muthuraman; Lakshmi; Jaya
- Cinematography: Babu
- Edited by: R. Vittal
- Music by: T. V. Raju
- Production company: Sri Navaneedha Films
- Release date: 26 May 1972
- Running time: 128 minutes
- Country: India
- Language: Tamil

Kanimuthu Paappa is a 1972 Indian Tamil-language drama film directed by S. P. Muthuraman in his directorial debut, and produced by S. Subramaniya Reddiyar. The film stars Jaishankar, R. Muthuraman, Lakshmi and Jaya. It was released on 26 May 1972.

== Cast ==
- Jaishankar as Raja
- R. Muthuraman as Dr. Ravi
- Lakshmi as
- Jaya as Radha
- Rajyalakshmi (debut) as Meena
- Baby Sridevi
- S. N. Lakshmi
- Vijayasri
- Kovai Kamatchi
- S. V. Ramadoss
- Suruli Rajan
- I. S. R
- M. Krishnamurthy

== Production ==
Kanimuthu Paappa marked the directorial debut of S. P. Muthuraman. The film's story and screenplay were written by V. C. Guhanathan. Muthuraman, who wanted to direct films outside AVM Productions, expressed his interest to A. V. Meiyappan through a letter to which he agreed and wished him well. Lakshmanan who worked as production controller for V. C. Guhanathan was initially supposed to produce the film; however he left the film with Guhanathan taking care of production and Subramaniya Reddiar providing finance.

== Soundtrack ==
The music was composed by T. V. Raju and lyrics were written by Poovai Senguttuvan. The song "Radhaiyin Nenjame" is based on the Hindi song "Khilte Hain Gul Yahan" from Sharmeelee (1971), and "Chithii Chollu Chollu" is based on "Hai Na Bolo Bolo" from Andaz (1971).

Track listing
No.	Title	Singers	Length
1.	"Radhayin Nenjame"	P. Susheela	3:08
2.	"Kalangale Kalangale Kadhal Isai"	S. P. Balasubrahmanyam	4:46
3.	"Chithii Chollu Chollu"	P. Susheela, Jothi Kanna	3:20
4.	"Ezhumalai Vasa"	P. Susheela	2:48
5.	"Ezhumalai Vasa 2"	P. Susheela	3:23
Total length:			17:25

== Bibliography ==
- Muthuraman, S. P. (2017) [2005]. AVM Thandha SPM (in Tamil) (3rd ed.). Vikatan. OCLC 607342391.
