= Ra. Sankaran =

Indian actor and director (1931–2023)

- Born: Ramarathnam Sankaran; 12 June 1931
- Died: 14 December 2023 (aged 92)
- Occupations: Actor, director
- Years active: 1974–1999

Ramarathnam Sankaran (12 June 1931 – 14 December 2023) was an Indian actor and director. He acted in supporting roles in many Tamil films and a few Telugu films.

== Life and career ==
Ramarathnam Sankaran was born on 12 June 1931. He was a cousin of actor Javar Seetharaman. He assisted several directors. Sankaran died on 14 December 2023, at the age of 92.

== Filmography ==
=== Director ===
Year	Film	Language	Notes
1974	Onne Onnu Kanne Kannu	Tamil	
1975	Then Sindhudhe Vaanam	Tamil	
1977	Durga Devi	Tamil	
1977	Oruvanukku Oruthi	Tamil	
1977	Perumaikkuriyaval	Tamil	
1977	Thoondil Meen	Tamil	
1979	Velum Mayilum Thunai	Tamil	
1980	Kumari Pennin Ullathile	Tamil	

=== Actor ===
Year	Film	Role	Language	Notes
1977	Perumaikkuriyaval		Tamil	
1984	Pudhumai Penn		Tamil	
1985	Oru Kaidhiyin Diary	Bishop	Tamil	
1985	Pagal Nilavu		Tamil	
1985	Pournami Alaigal	Church Father	Tamil	
1986	Mouna Ragam	Chandramouli, Divya's father	Tamil	
1986	Unakkaagave Vaazhgiren		Tamil	
1987	Kadamai Kanniyam Kattupaadu		Tamil	
1987	Makkal En Pakkam		Tamil	
1989	Nyaya Tharasu		Tamil	
1990	Ethir Kaatru		Tamil	
1990	Aadi Velli		Tamil	
1990	Pondatti Thevai	Sankar, Shanthi's father	Tamil	
1990	Pathimoonam Number Veedu	Swamy	Tamil	
1991	Thayamma		Tamil	
1992	Amaran		Tamil	
1992	Sevagan	Shanmugam, Anjali's father	Tamil	
1992	Purushan Enakku Arasan		Tamil	
1992	Abhirami		Tamil	
1992	Chinna Gounder	Advocate	Tamil	
1993	Amaravathi	Church Father	Tamil	
1993	Thalattu	Temple Priest	Tamil	
1993	Rojavai Killathe	Anu's father	Tamil	
1994	Chinna Madam	Judge	Tamil	
1994	Aranmanai Kaavalan		Tamil	
1994	Vaanga Partner Vaanga	Gurukkal	Tamil	
1995	Jameen Kottai		Tamil	
1995	Sathi Leelavathi		Tamil	
1996	Anthimanthaarai		Tamil	
1996	Kadhal Kottai	Church Father	Tamil	
1998	Bhagavath Singh		Tamil	
1999	Azhagarsamy		Tamil	
