= Cho Ramaswamy =

Indian actor

Member of Parliament, Rajya Sabha
- In office 16 November 1999 – 15 November 2005
- President: K. R. Narayanan (1997 – 2002); A. P. J. Abdul Kalam (2002 – 2007)
- Prime Minister: Atal Bihari Vajpayee
- Constituency: Nominated

Founder & Author of Thuglak
- In office 14 January 1970 – 7 December 2016
- Preceded by: Position established
- Succeeded by: Swaminathan Gurumurthy

Personal details
- Born: Srinivasa Iyer Ramaswamy; 5 October 1934 Mylapore, Madras Presidency, British India (present day Chennai, Tamil Nadu, India)
- Died: 7 December 2016 (aged 82) Chennai, Tamil Nadu, India
- Spouse: Soundaramba Ramaswamy (m. 1966)
- Children: 2
- Relatives: Ramya Krishnan (niece)
- Occupation: Actor; political satirist; journalist; lawyer; editor; director; screen writer
- Awards: Padma Bhushan (2017)
- Writing career
- Notable work: Thuglak

Srinivasa Iyer Ramaswamy, better known as Cho Ramaswamy (5 October 1934 – 7 December 2016), was an Indian actor, comedian, editor, political commentator, satirist, playwright, film director and lawyer from Tamil Nadu. He was a popular comedian in the 1960s and 1970s, and had acted with all the top stars in that period.

== Early life ==
Srinivasa Ramaswamy was fondly addressed and remembered as Cho. He was born in a family of lawyers.

== Family ==
The elder son of R. Srinivasa Iyer and Rajammal, Cho had a younger brother, who was also an actor. Cho died on 7 December 2016. He has two children Sriram Ramaswamy and Sindhuja. He did his schooling from P. S. High School. His niece is actress Ramya Krishnan. The name 'Cho' was the name of the character he played in a Tamil play written by Bhageerathan titled Thenmozhiyaal.

== Film career ==
=== Films ===
Cho made his debut in 1963 with Paar Magale Paar as a comedian. From 1963 to 2005 he acted in 180 Tamil films and directed 5 films. He also wrote and directed 20 plays.

He also wrote and acted in 27 Television serials. He wrote 10 books. Apart from being an actor, he was both the screenplay and story writer of films such as Thenmazhai, Ninaivil Nindraval, Bommalattam, Aayiram Poi and Panam Paththum Seyyum, all of which proved to be box office hits.

Cho played the role of a bike mechanic in the play Petralthan Pillaiya, written by Pattu of the United Amateur Artistes (UAA), which became a huge success. When the play was later adapted into a film by director A. Bhimsingh, Sivaji Ganesan persuaded Cho to play the same role in the film too, leading to Cho's entry into the film world. Cho and Jayalalithaa have worked together in 19 films and also had been part of the same drama troupe.

==== Frequent collaborations ====
Cho as an actor has been pitted against other actors across generations. His comic timing against T. S. Balaiah in Manam Oru Kurangu, or with M. R. Radha, or many times with actors like V. K. Ramaswamy, Nagesh, Manorama and Sachu in many films brought out the best in him.

Cho and Manorama were paired together in 20 films, which included Malligaip poo, Annaiyum pithavum, Dharisanam, Anbait thedi, Ninaivil Nindraval, Nirai Kudam, Therottam, Aayiram Poi, Mohammed Bin Tughlaq, Bommalattam, Pugundha Veedu, Vilayaattu Pillai, Kanavan, Rojavin Raja and Velum Mayilum Thunai and were pitted in a non-couple role in Suryagandhi, Delhi Mappilai and Naadagame Ulagam.

Cho acted alongside Nagesh in Thenmazhai, Ninaivil Nindraval, Ulagam Ivvalavudhaan and Bommalattam among others. He was paired opposite Sachu in films like Deva Sankalpam, Galaataa Kalyanam and Delhi Mappilai.

Cho has acted with the MGR–Jayalalitha combo in films like Oli Villaku, Kanavan, Kumari Kottam, Mattukara Velan, Aadimai Penn, Engal Thangam, Thedi Vantha Mapillai, En Annan and Neerum Nerupum. Cho has acted with MGR in many films like Petralthaan Pillaiya, Sangey Muzhangu, Rickshawkaaran and Thalaivan. Cho has acted with Jayalalitha in other films like Bommalaattam, Galaattaak kalyanam, Suryagandhi, Vandhaale Maharaasi and Anbai Thedi.

Cho has acted with Sivakumar in films like Shanmugapriya, Onne Onnu Kanne Kannu, Thaip Paasam, Uravu Solla Oruvan, Aan Pillai Singam, Yaarukkum Vetkamillai, Chinna Kuyil Padudhu, Sattai Illatha Pambaram and Kanna Thorakiran Samy. Among these, Yaarukkum Vetkamillai was directed by Cho in 1976.

== Journalism ==
He was the founder and editor of the Tamil magazine Thuglak. Politicians such as J. B. Kripalani, Indira Gandhi, Karunanidhi, Chandra Shekhar, G. K. Moopanar, M. G. Ramachandran, Jayalalithaa, Ramakrishna Hegde, N. T. Rama Rao, Atal Bihari Vajpayee, and L. K. Advani, Sonia Gandhi, Manmohan Singh and P. Chidambaram were targets of his editorial attacks. In his last years, he predicted that Narendra Modi would "win laurels for India" in the future, and also praised Jayalalithaa for her administration of Tamil Nadu.

During the internal Emergency (1975–1977), Cho protested government press censorship through his publications. In response to "pre-censorship" regulations, Thuglak briefly halted publication and subsequently issued an edition featuring an entirely black front cover. Cho bypassed censors by using metaphorical commentary, such as reviewing the 1951 Tamil film Sarvadhikari (the dictator) to critique authoritarianism.

Front cover of Thuglak published in solid black to protest Emergency pre-censorship regulations in 1975.

Cho enjoyed challenging MG Ramachandran (MGR) and his politics, while Karunanidhi stayed his target. The All India Anna Dravida Munnetra Kazhagam (AIADMK), in his opinion, was populist and lacked ideology.

On 25 January 2017, the Government of India announced a posthumous Padma Bhushan award for his contribution towards Literature & Education – Journalism.

== Politics ==
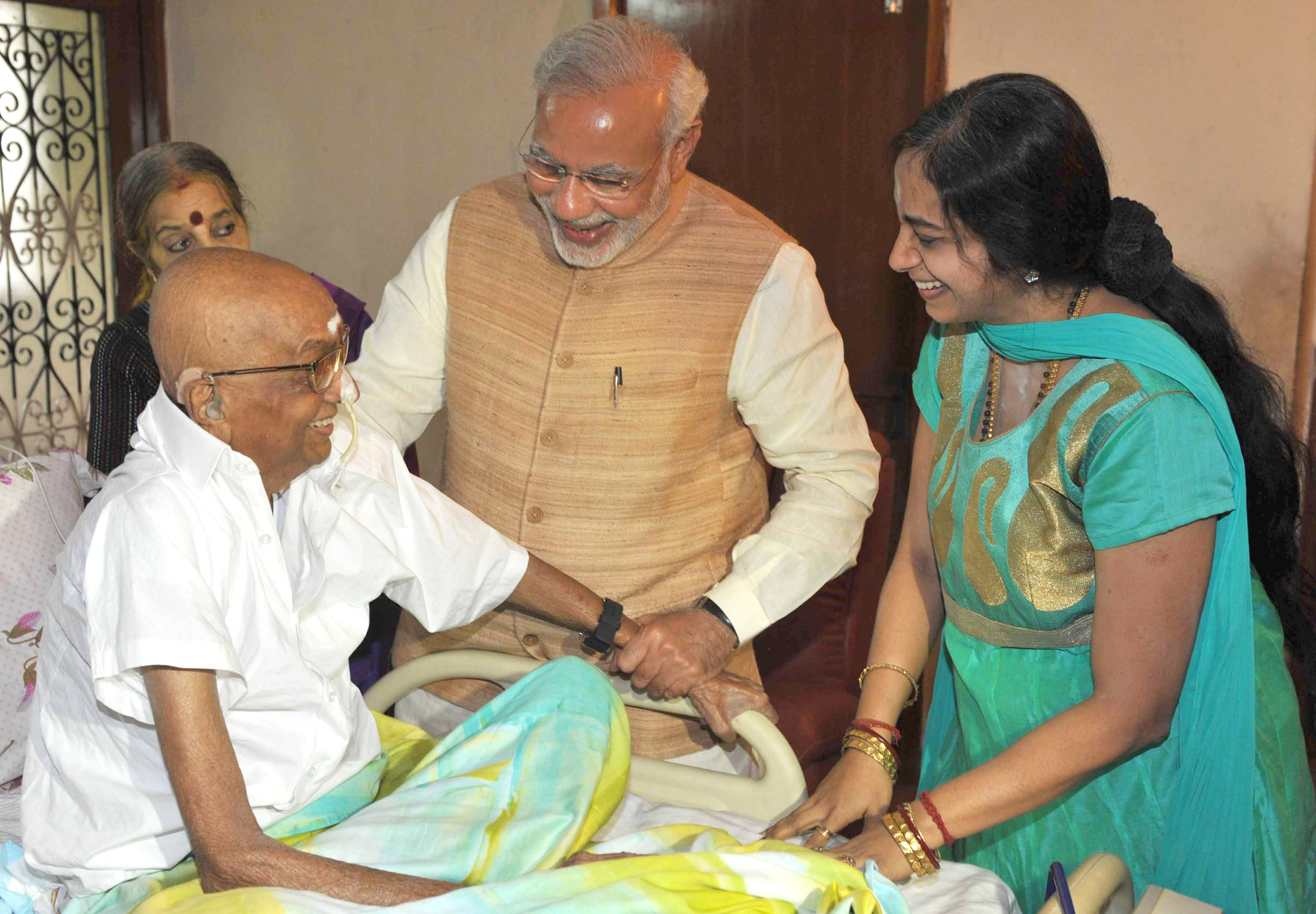
Prime Minister Narendra Modi calls on Ailing Cho Ramaswamy in August 2015

Cho has been described as a right-wing public intellectual in tributes.

Cho was publicly opposed to Sri Lankan Tamil militants, particularly the Liberation Tigers of Tamil Eelam (LTTE), at a time when Sri lanka's ethnic crisis was at its peak and almost all political parties in Tamil Nadu highlighted the issue of the Sri Lankan Tamils.

In national politics, Cho supported the Bharatiya Janata Party (BJP) and acted as an interlocutor between regional parties and national leaders. In 1999, he was instrumental in bringing the Dravida Munnetra Kazhagam (DMK) together in an alliance with BJP. He was successful in bringing G. K. Moopanar, of the Tamil Maanila Congress and Karunanidhi together in the 1996 elections, and getting Rajnikanth to publicly support the alliance to defeat Jayalalithaa. In 2001, He facilitated alliance between Jayalalithaa and Moopanar for Tamil Nadu Assembly elections.

After 2004, Cho took a supportive stance toward Jayalalitha while remaining critical of the DMK-led alliance. In 2011, he helped broker an electoral pact between Vijayakanth's DMDK and the AIADMK. Cho was an ardent supporter of Narendra Modi. Cho had campaigned extensively for Prime Minister Narendra Modi during the 2014 Indian general election; Modi described Ramaswamy as "Rajguru", and called himself his "fan".

He was nominated to the Rajya Sabha by the President of India, K. R. Narayanan. In the Rajya Sabha 12 MPs are nominated by the President of India from amongst persons who have special knowledge or practical experience in the fields of literature, science, art or social service. He served as a Rajya Sabha MP from November 1999 to November 2005.

Commentators offered differing perspectives on Cho's legacy. Writing for the Scroll.in, V,Geetha described him as aligned with right-wing politics, calling him "the Sangh Parivar's political man in Chennai". Conversely, obituaries in publications such as The Indian Express and The Hindu characterized him primarily as an iconic satirist and political contrarian who sustained personal friendships with political opponents across party lines.

== Partial filmography ==
=== As actor ===
Year	Film	Role	Notes
1963	Paar Magaley Paar		
1966	Marakka Mudiyumaa?		
1966	Thenmazhai		
1967	Ninaivil Nindraval		
1967	Manam Oru Kurangu		
1967	Penn Endraal Penn		
1967	Naan Yaar Theriyuma		
1967	Karpooram		
1967	Aalayam		Guest appearance
1968	Galatta Kalyanam	Vittal	
1968	Bommalattam		
1968	Neelagiri Express		
1968	Kuzhanthaikkaga		
1968	Delhi Mapillai	Chinna Thambi	
1968	Lakshmi Kalyanam		
1968	Kannan En Kadhalan		
1968	Oli Vilakku		
1968	Kanavan		
1968	Siritha Mugam		
1969	Nirai Kudam		
1969	Aayiram Poi	Muthu	
1969	Ulagam Ivvalavuthaan		
1969	Adimai Penn		
1969	Aindhu Laksham		
1969	Kanni Penn		
1969	Magizham Poo		
1969	Annaiyum Pithavum		
1970	En Annan		
1970	Maattukara Velan		
1970	Engal Thangam		
1970	Enga Mama	Gnanam	
1970	Thedi Vandha Mappillai	Karpagam	
1970	Dharisanam		
1970	Nadu Iravil		
1970	Vilayattu Pillai		
1970	Snegithi		
1971	Muhammad bin Tughluq		
1971	Therottam		
1971	Neerum Neruppum		
1971	Rickshawkaran		
1971	Oru Thaai Makkal		
1971	Kumari Kottam	Babu	
1971	Arunodhayam		
1971	Soodhattam		
1971	Yanai Valartha Vanambadi Magan		
1972	Thavapudhalavan		
1972	Unakkum Enakkum		
1972	Mr.Sampath		
1972	Puguntha Veedu		
1972	Thaaikku Oru Pillai		
1972	Sange Muzhangu		
1972	Deiva Sankalpam		
1973	Vandhale Magarasi		
1973	Suryakanthi		
1973	Gauravam		
1973	Pon Vanndu		
1973	Vakkuruthi		
1973	Ganga Gowri		
1973	Manitharil Maanikkam		
1973	Kasi Yathirai		
1973	Ponnunjal		
1973	Shanmugapriya		
1973	Vayadi		
1973	Veettukku Vandha Marumagal		
1973	Malligai Poo		
1973	School Master		
1973	Nalla Mudivu		
1973	Anbu Sagodharargal		
1974	Thanga Pathakkam		
1974	Orey Saatchi		
1974	Anbai Thedi		
1974	Idhayam Parkkirathu		Guest appearance
1974	Roshakkaari		
1974	Devi Sri Karmariamman		
1974	Kalyanamam Kalyanam		
1974	Onne Onnu Kanne Kannu		
1974	Pillai Selvam		
1974	Thai Pasam		
1974	Magalukkaga		
1975	Aan Pillai Singam		
1975	Sonthankal Vaazhga		
1975	Andharangam		
1975	Cinema Paithiyam		Guest appearance
1975	Unga Veettu Kalyaanam		
1975	Avandhan Manidhan		
1975	Thai Veettu Seethanam		
1975	Uravu Solla Oruvan		
1975	Yarukkum Vetkamillai		
1975	Pinchu Manam		
1975	Melnaattu Marumagal		Guest appearance
1976	Unmaye Un Vilai Enna		
1976	Mayor Meenakshi		
1976	Rojavin Raja		
1976	Avan Oru Sarithiram		Guest appearance
1976	Perum Pugazhum		
1977	Thanikudithanam		
1977	Balappareetchai		
1977	Unnai Sutrum Ulagam		Guest appearance
1978	Sakka Podu Podu Raja		
1978	Annapoorani		
1979	Aarilirunthu Arubathu Varai		
1979	Nadagame Ulagam		
1979	Velum Mayilum Thunai		
1981	Kadavulin Theerppu		
1983	Adutha Varisu		
1984	Naan Mahaan Alla	A. R. Chandran/Reddy	
1984	Saattai Illatha Pambaram		
1985	Navgraha Nayagi		
1985	Puthiya Theerpu		
1986	Kanna Thorakkanum Saami		
1987	Chinna Kuyil Paaduthu		
1987	Kani Nilam		
1987	Manithan		
1987	Anand		
1987	Paruva Ragam		
1988	Guru Sishyan		
1990	Adhisaya Piravi		
1990	Ulagam Pirandhadhu Enakkaga		
1998	Kadhala Kadhala		

=== Direction ===
1. Muhammad bin Tughluq (1971)
2. Mr. Sampath (1972)
3. Yarukkum Vetkam Illai (1975)
4. Unmaiye Un Vilai Enna (1976)
5. Sambo Siva Samboo (1977)

=== Screenplay ===
1. Thenmazhai (1966)
2. Ninaivil Nindraval (1967)
3. Manam Oru Kurangu (1967)
4. Neelagiri Express (1968)
5. Bommalattam (1968)
6. Aayiram Poi (1969)
7. Nirai Kudam (1969)

=== Story and dialogues ===
1. Kani Nilam (1987)

== Other works ==
=== Plays ===
Year	Play	Role	Notes
	Kalyani		debut drama
	Wait and See		directed by KB
	Why Not		directed by KB
	What For		directed by KB
	Muhammad bin Tughluq		
	Yaarukkum Vetkamillai		
	Saathiram Sonnadhillai		
	Nermai Urangum Neram		
	Iraivan Irandhuvittana?		
	Enru Thaniyum Inda Sudandira Thaagam?		
	Judgement Reserved		
	Quo Vadis		
	Unmayae Unn Villai Ennae?		
	Saraswathiyin Selvan		
	Unmai Urangum Neram		
	Madras by Night		

=== Bibliography ===
1. Hindu Maha Samudram Vol – I, II, III, IV, V, and VI (Latest)
2. Mahabaratham Pesugirathu
3. Valmiki Ramayanam
4. Verukathagada Bramaniyam
5. Nane Raja

=== Television ===
1. Engey Brahmanan?
2. Verukatthakkatha Brahmaneeyam?
3. Sambavami Yuge Yuge
4. Vande Mataram
5. Ivargalai Therindhu Kollungal
6. Washington Il Nallathambi
7. Sarakar Pugunda Veedu
8. Koovam Nadikaraiyinile
9. Adhigaprasangam
10. Yaro Ivar Yaro?
11. Saadhal Ellaiyel Kaadhal
12. Mydear BrahmaDeva
13. India Enge Pogiradhu?
14. Kamarajarai Sandhitthen
15. Puratchi Geethai
16. Sattam Thalai Guniyattum
17. Enge Pogirai?
18. Embak Kana Onru Kandaen
19. Saraswathiyin Selvan
20. Manam Oru Kurangu
21. En Koodathu?
22. Eravil Chennai
23. Uravugal Ellaiyadi Pappa
24. Edarkaga?
25. Thiraiyulagathai Thirumbi Parkiraen
26. Unmayae Unn Villai Ennae?
27. Janatha Nagar Colony

== Satire ==
Following Sanjay Gandhi's death in an air crash, Cho released stamps in memory of Capt. Subhash Saxena, the pilot of the aircraft, who also died in the air crash. The postal departments failed to realise that these stamps were not official and mistakenly delivered mail that had them affixed.

== Illness and death ==
Cho was hospitalized in January 2015 and was in and out of hospital due to illness. He died of a cardiac arrest at 3:58 AM on 7 December 2016, aged 82, at Apollo Hospital in Chennai, where he was receiving treatment for respiratory problems. He was survived by his wife, Soundaramba Ramaswamy, son Rajivakshan alias Sriram, and daughter Sindhu.

His death happened a day after Jayalalithaa had died. Rajinikanth disclosed later that Jayalalithaa had always wished that Cho should live as long as she lived. He quoted: "As it turns out, he was alive till then and even few hours after that."

K. Veeramani, leader of the Dravidar Kazhagam and a self-confessed atheist, in his tributes to Cho, said he was a unique journalist with independent views.
