= L. R. Eswari =

Indian singer

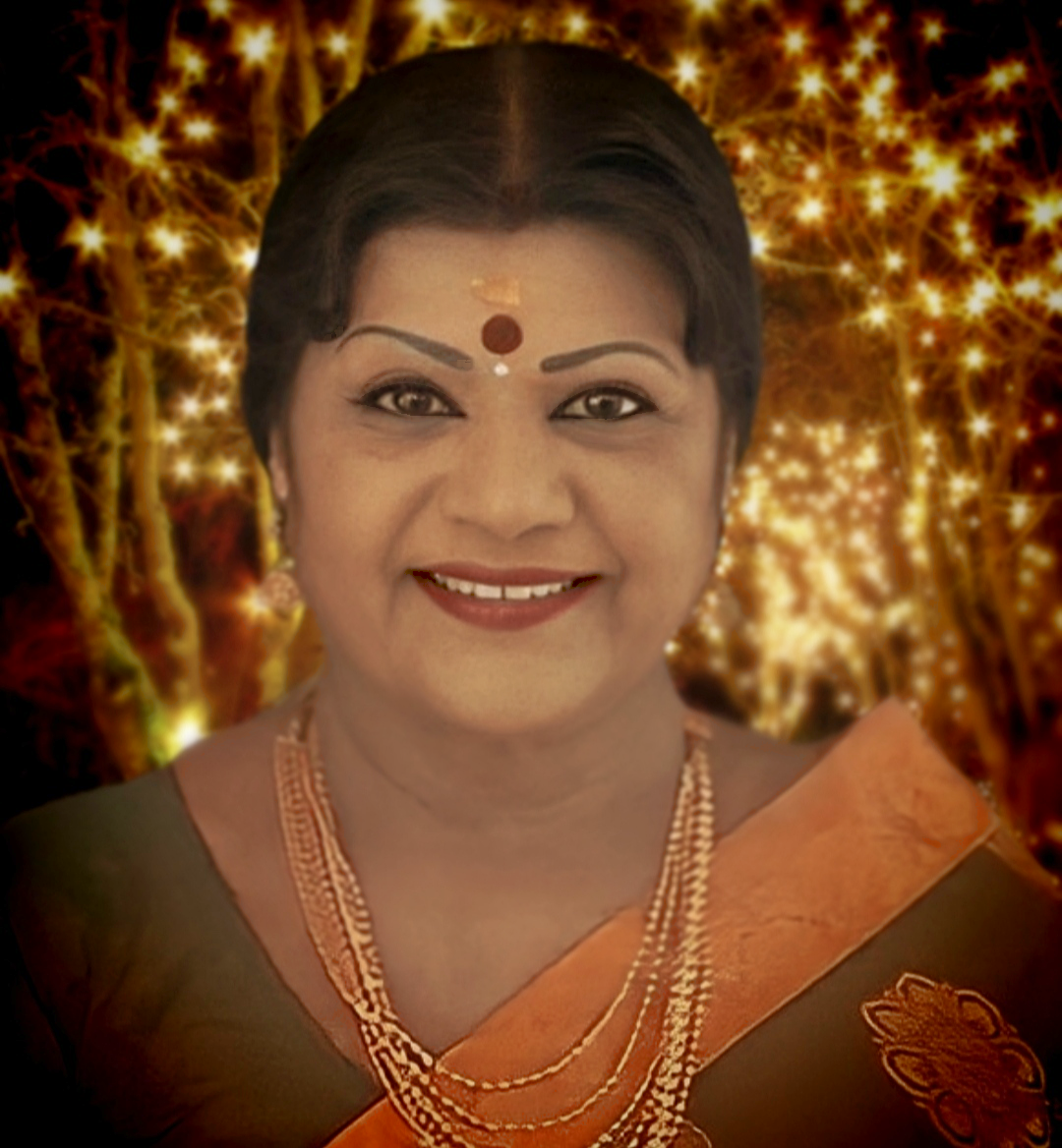

Background information
- Born: Lourde-Mary Rajeswari; 7 December 1939 (age 86); Madras, Madras Province, British India (now Chennai, Tamil Nadu, India)
- Genres: Playback singing, Carnatic music
- Occupation: Singer
- Instrument: Vocalist
- Years active: 1954–present
- Award: Kalaimamani

Lourde-Mary Rajeswari, better known as L. R. Eswari, is an Indian playback singer who has sung various songs in Tamil, Telugu, Malayalam, Kannada, Tulu, Konkani, English and Hindi.

== Early life ==
Eswari was born Lourde-Mary Rajeshwari in present-day Chennai to Regina Mary Nirmala and Anthony Devraj. She did not have any formal training in singing. Her mother was a chorus singer in films. Eshwari used to accompany her mother to the studios and soon began singing in the chorus herself, but quickly got a break to lend her voice as lead-singer. Her first break came from K. V. Mahadevan in 1958 in the movie Nalla Idathu Sammandham, her first solo song recorded in this movie was "Ivarey Thaan Avare". Major recognition for her came from the song "Vaarai En Thozhi Vaaraayo" from the movie Pasamalar (1961) sung under the baton of Viswanathan–Ramamoorthy.

== Career ==
Eswari gave her first song "Inbanaalidhe Idhayam Kaanudhe" for the movie Manohara(1954) along with Jikki. She sang under the direction of famous composers like M. S. Viswanathan, T.K. Ramamoorthy, K. V. Mahadevan, Veda, V. Kumar, Shankar-Ganesh, G. K. Venkatesh and Kunnakudi Vaidyanathan. Her voice was considered to be suited for peppy numbers in films.

She has also recorded many devotional albums in praise of the Goddess Amman. She sang Christmas songs like "Varuvai Varuvai" and "Deivam Thantha Divya Kumaaran".

P. Susheela and she sang with Unadhu Malar, Chiththira Poovizhi, Ninaithaal Sirippu, and Thoodhu Sella. She sang a duet "Gudilona Naa Swamy Koluvai Unnadu" with S. Janaki in the Telugu movie Idalokam, with music by Chakravarthy. She rendered several duets with S. Janaki in Kannada movies as well.

She sang various duets with Ghantasala, in the Telugu doyen in his own music direction in the Telugu movie Pandava Vana Vaasam, and in K. V. Mahadevan's music direction in Prema Nagar, T. M. Soundararajan, A. L. Raghavan, P. B. Sreenivas, S.P. Balasubramaniam, K. J. Yesudas, J. P. Chandrababu, C. S. Jayaraman, S. C. Krishnan, Thiruchi Loganathan, A. M. Rajah, Seerkazhi Govindarajan, Malaysia Vasudevan, and Jayachandran. She also sang duets with female singers, most notably with P. Suseela, S. Janaki, Vani Jayaram, K. Jamuna Rani, M. S. Rajeswari and Soolamangalam Rajalakshmi.

She sang "Kanda kanmaniye ammana araginiye o raja", a Kannada song for the movie Bala Nagamma in the early 1960s.

== Re-entry ==
After a long break, she made her re-entry through a Tamil song, "Kalasala Kalasala", in the 2011 movie Osthe, starring Silambarasan. She sang the song "Naa Poondamallida" in the film Thadaiyara Thaakka in the following year. She has also recently sang a Kannada song for the movie Victory, named "Yakka Nin Magalu Nanage", with Kailash Kher. In 2013, she sang a duet song called "Thagadu Thagadu" along with T. Rajendar in the movie Arya Surya. In 2014, she sang the song "Jaipuril Jaipuril" in the movie Athithi, with music by Bharadwaj. In 2020, she sung a song for the film Mookuthi Amman named "Aadi Kuthu". She received the title Mother of Chennai. Notable songs

== Awards ==
- She is a recipient of the Kalaimamani, an award for arts and culture in Tamil Nadu in 1984, for her contributions to the film industry.

=== Tamil songs ===
Song	Film
"Muthukulikka Vareegala"	Anubavi Raja Anubavi
"Thagadu Thagadu"	Arya Surya
"Kaveri Thanniyil Kulichavadi"	Aayiram Poi
"Saaya Veeti"	Paava Mannippu
"Mappillai Ragasiyam"	Arangketram
"Adi Ennadi Ulagam "	Aval Oru Thodar Kathai
"Enna Solla Enna Solla"	Babu
"Kangalum Kavadi"	Enga Vittu Pillai
"Puthi Sigamani"	Iruvar Ullam
"Chithirai Poovizhi"	Ithayathil Nee
"Yenna Poruthamadi"	Kanavan
"Aadavaralaam Aada Varalaam"	Karuppu Panam
"Malarendra Mugam Indru"	Kaadhalikka Neramillai
"Enthan Nenjam Yaarai"	Kathalithal Pothuma
"Kathal Penney"	Kathalithal Pothuma
"Maapillai Vanthan"	Kaveriyin Kanavan
"Poottale Unnaiyum"	Lakshmi Kalyanam
"Avala Ivala"	Mannathi Mannan
"Aval Oru Kathanayagi"	Moondru Mudichu
"Singapore Machan"	Naam Moovar
"Pirantha Idam Thedi"	Naan Aanaiyittal
"Dhukkaththilum"	Nalla Idathu Sammantham
"Oh Lakshmi"	Neela Vanam
"Nee Ninaithal"	Nilave Nee Satchi
"Inimai Niraintha Ulagam"	Ninaithale Inikkum
"Naam Oruvarai Oruvar"	Oruvar
"En Vaalibam Ennum Mahligaiyil"	Paalkudam
"Vaarayo Thozhi"	Paasa Malar
"Sonnathellam Nadanthiduma"	Padha Kaanikkai
"Ithazhai Virithathu Roja"	Pattanathil Bootham
"Kaalgal Nindrathu"	Poojaikku Vantha Malar
"Ithu Margazhi Matham"	Praptham
"Sala Sala Kathottam"	Praptham
"Raja Veetu Pennanalum"	Raja Veetu Pillai
"Manamagale Marumagale"	Saradha
"Lilli Lali Jimmy"	Selvam
"Vennila Mugam"	Selvamagal
"Naanoru Kaathal"	Thavapudhalavan
"Pennai Parthum"	Shanthi Nilayam
"Pushpa Raagam"	Thani Kudithanam
"Kulunga Kulunga"	Kai Koduttha Dheivam
"Nenaithen unnai"	Thangai
"Nurandu Kalam Vazhga"	Pesum Dheivam
"Raja rajasri Rani"	Ooty Varai Uravu
"Kadavul Thantha"	Iru Malargal
"Engal Kalyanam"	Galatta Kalyanam
"Uraviniel Fivety Fivety"	Galatta Kalyanam
"Munthi Munthi Vinayaganeya"	En Thambi
"Sakthi Thannadu"	Thanga Surangam
"Nadhieya Madhuvanal"	Thanga Surangam
"Muthamidum Neram"	Sivandha Mann
"Pattathu rani"	Sivandha Mann
"Pathu pathinaru"	Anjal Petti 520
"Adhi Manithan"	Anjal Petti 520
"Hei"	Anbalippu
"Kottai Mathir Mele"	Thirudan
"Ninaitha padi"	Thirudan
"Soragam Pakkathil"	Enga Mama
"Ithuthan eanathu"	Vilaiyaattu Pillai
"My ledy kad body"	Vietnam Veedu
"Unga Nalla manasukku"	Ethiroli
"Kalyanama Kalyanam"	Ethiroli
"Hello miss"	Engirundho Vandhaal
"Nalu kalu sir"	Sorgam
"Ivalavuthan Ulagam"	Ulagam Ivalavuthan
"Ada Sarithan Podi"	Uyira Maanama
"Savale Samali"	Uyira Maanama
"Enge Enge En Manathu"	Vaaliba Virunthu
"Ammamma Kannathil Kannam"	Vallavan Oruvan
"Palinginal Oru Mahligai"	Vallavan Oruvan
"Kathodhuthan Naan"	Velli Vizha
"Allipanthal Kaalgal"	Vennira Aadai
"Nee Emppathenna"	Vennira Aadai
"Pondamalli"	Thadaiyara Thaakka
"Kalasala Kalasala"	Osthe
"Ranipettai Rani"	Tamilselvanum Kalaiselviyum
"Elantha Palam"	Panama Pasama
"Aadi Kuththu"	Mookuthi Amman

=== Telugu songs ===
Year	Film	Song
1965	Pandava Vanavasam	"Mogali Rekula Sigadaana"
1967	Ummadi Kutumbam	"Jigi Jigi Jigelumannadi Chinnadi"
1968	Bandipotu Dongalu	"Gandara Ganda Soggadivanta"
1969	Kaipuraa	Naa choope Pilupura
1970	Kathanayika Molla	"Naane Cheluve Kannadiki"
1970	Lakshmi Kataksham	"Andala Bommanu Nenu Chelikada"
1971	Prema Nagar	"Le Le Le Naa Raaja"
1971	Amma Maata	"Mayadari Sinnodu"
1972	Tata Manavadu	"Nookalammani Nene Nee Peekani Nokkettane"
1973	Devudu Chesina Manushulu	"Masaka Masaka Cheekatilo"
1973	Jeevana Tarangalu	"Nandamaya Garuda Nandamaya"
1974	Nippulanti Manishi	"Welcome Swagatam Chesta Ninne Paravasam"
1976	Anthuleni Katha	"Are Emiti Lokam"
1978	Maro Charitra	"Bhale Bhale Magadivoi Bangaru Naasaamivoi"
1978	Pranam Khareedu	"Bandameeda Undi Gundodi Debba"
1979	Andamaina Anubhavam	"Ananda Thandavame Adenuga Aa Sivudu"

=== Malayalam songs ===
Year	Film	Song
1964	Althaara	"Onathumpee vannaatte"
1964	Bharthavu	"Kaakkakuyile Cholloo"
1964	Kuttikkuppayam	"Oru Kotta"
1965	Rosi	"Kannilenthaanu "
1965	Subaidha	"Oru Kudukka "
1966	Anarkali	"Chakravarthikumaaraa"
1966	Archana	"Ethra Kandaalum"
1968	Hotel High Range	"Puthiya raagam puthiya thaalam "
1968	Velutha Kathreena	"Kannil Kaamabanam "
1970	Dathuputhran	"Wine Glass"
1970	Nizhalattam	"Devadaasiyalla Njan"
1971	Lankadahanam	"Kilukile Chirikkum"
1973	Jesus	"Ente Munthirichaarino"
1973	Panitheeratha Veedu	"Maaril syamanthakarathnam chaarthi"
1974	Devi Kanyakumari	"Madhuchashakam"
1974	Night Duty	"Innu Ninte Youvanathinezhazhaku"
1974	Aval Oru Thodar Kathai-D	"Edi Enthedi"

She had sung in around 200 Malayalam films.

=== Kannada songs ===
Year	Film	Song
1958	Anna Thangi	"Bandaane Ava Bandaane"
1964	Chandavalliya Thota	"Suma Baaleya"
1962	Thayi Karulu	"Dooradinda Bandavare"
1964	Veera Sankalpa	"Sittyako Sidukyako"
1965	Mahasathi Anasuya	"Aa Deva Ee Deva"
1968	Hannele Chiguridaga	"Ide Hudugi"
1970	Bhoopathi Ranga	"Rasika Rasika"
1970	Paropakari	"Jokey"
1970	Boregowda Bangalorige Banda	"Malagova Maavina"
1970	Mahadiya Mane	"Rambe Ennuvalu"
1970	Anugraha	"Boraiah Basavaiah"
1971	Samshaya Phala	"Dooradinda Bandantha"
1972	Sipayi Ramu	"Kokorekoko"
1974	Professor Huchuraya	"Hare Rama Hare Krishna" "Hello My Boy"

=== Konkani songs ===
Year	Song	Film
	Ang Mhujem Choi	"Jivit Amchem Oxem"

== Onscreen appearances ==
- Pudhu Manithan (1991) as herself
- Thillalangadi (2010) as herself
- Mookuthi Amman (2020) as herself
