= List of Tamil films of 1967 =

The following is a list of films produced in the Tamil film industry in India in 1967, in alphabetical order.

== 1967 ==
Title	Director	Producer	Music	Cast
Aalayam	Thirumalai–Mahalingam	Sunbeam Productions	T. K. Ramamoorthy	Major Sundarrajan, Srikanth, Nagesh
Anubavam Pudhumai	C. V. Rajendran	Thirumagal Combines	M. S. Viswanathan	R. Muthuraman, Rajasree, T. R. Ramachandran
Anubavi Raja Anubavi	K. Balachander	Ayya Films	M. S. Viswanathan	Nagesh, R. Muthuraman, Rajasree, Jayabharathi
Apoorva Piravigal	G. Viswanatham	Lakshmi Saraswathi Movies		T. L. Kantha Rao, Vanisree
Arasa Kattalai	M. G. Chakrapani	Sathyaraja Pictures	K. V. Mahadevan	M. G. Ramachandran, B. Saroja Devi, Jayalalitha
Athey Kangal	A. C. Tirulokchandar	AVM Productions	Vedha	Ravichandran, Kanchana, Nagesh
Bhakta Prahlada	CH. Narayana Moorthy	AVM Productions	S. Rajeswara Rao	S. V. Ranga Rao, Anjali Devi, Roja Ramani
Bama Vijayam	K. Balachander	Manohar Productions	M. S. Viswanathan	Sowcar Janaki, R. Muthuraman, Nagesh, Rajasree, Kanchana
Bhavani	T. R. Ramanna	Anna Productions	M. S. Viswanathan	Jaishankar, S. A. Ashokan, C. R. Vijayakumari, Vanisri, Nagesh
Deiva Cheyal	M. G. Balu	Dhandayuthapani Films	R. Diwakar	Major Sundarrajan, R. Muthuraman, Bharathi
Ethirigal Jakkirathai	R. Sundaram	Modern Theatres	Vedha	Ravichandran, R. S. Manohar, L. Vijayalakshmi
Engalukkum Kalam Varum	A. Vincent	Pauls & Company	T. K. Ramamoorthy	Padmini, Nagesh
Iru Malargal	A. C. Tirulokchandar	Manijeh Cine Productions	M. S. Viswanathan	Sivaji Ganesan, Padmini, K. R. Vijaya
Kadhalithal Podhuma	K. V. Srinivas	Modern Theatres	Vedha	Jaishankar, Vanisri, Vennira Aadai Nirmala
Kan Kanda Deivam	K. S. Gopalakrishnan	Kamaal Brothers	K. V. Mahadevan	Padmini, S. V. Ranga Rao, Nagesh, Sivakumar
Kandhan Karunai	A. P. Nagarajan	A. L. S. Productions	K. V. Mahadevan	Sivaji Ganesan, Gemini Ganesan, Savitri, K. R. Vijaya, Jayalalitha
Karpooram	C. N. Shanmugham	Sashti Films	D. B. Ramachandran	A. V. M. Rajan, Pushpalatha, Cho, Manorama
Kaavalkaaran	P. Neelakantan	Sathya Movies	M. S. Viswanathan	M. G. Ramachandran, Jayalalitha, Sivakumar
Maadi Veettu Mappilai	S. K. A. Chari	Prasad Art Pictures	T. Chalapathi Rao	Ravichandran, Jayalalitha, Major Sundarrajan, Nagesh
Magaraasi	M. A. Thirumugam	Dhandayuthapani Films	Shankar–Ganesh	Ravichandran, Jayalalitha
Manam Oru Kurangu	A. T. Krishnaswamy	Sashti Films	D. B. Ramachandran	R. Muthuraman, A. V. M. Rajan, K. R. Vijaya, Cho, T. S. Balaiah, Vijaya Rani
Muhurtha Naal	P. Madhavan	Arun Prasad Movies	K. V. Mahadevan	Jaishankar, K. R. Vijaya, R. Muthuraman, Nagesh
Naan	T. R. Ramanna	Sri Vinayaka Pictures	T. K. Ramamoorthy	Ravichandran, Jayalalitha, R. Muthuraman
Naan Yaar Theriyuma	V. V. Ramanan	Navasakthi Films	Shankar–Ganesh	Jaishankar, Bharathi, M. A. Radhika, Cho, B. V. Radha
Nenjirukkum Varai	C. V. Sridhar	Chithralaya	M. S. Viswanathan	Sivaji Ganesan, K. R. Vijaya, R. Muthuraman
Ninaivil Nindraval	V. Srinivasan	Muktha Films	V. Kumar	Ravichandran, K. R. Vijaya, Cho
Ooty Varai Uravu	C. V. Sridhar	K. C. Films	M. S. Viswanathan	Sivaji Ganesan, K. R. Vijaya, R. Muthuraman, L. Vijayalakshmi
Paaladai	A. Bhimsingh	Kamala Pictures	K. V. Mahadevan	Sivaji Ganesan, Padmini, K. R. Vijaya
Pandhyam	A. Kasilingam	M. K. Movies	T. R. Pappa	Gemini Ganesan, A. V. M. Rajan, Vijaya Nirmala, Shylashri
Pattanathil Bhootham	M. V. Raman	Saradha Productions	R. Govardhanam	Jaishankar, K. R. Vijaya, Nagesh, Vijaya Lalitha
Pattathu Rani	S. Ramanathan	Sunbeam Productions	T. K. Ramamoorthy	Gemini Ganesan, Kalpana, P. Bhanumathi
Penn Endral Penn	Aaroor Dass	A. L. S. Productions	M. S. Viswanathan	Gemini Ganesan, B. Saroja Devi, C. R. Vijayakumari, Cho, V. K. Ramasamy, K. A. Thangavelu, A. Karunanidhi, S. A. Ashokan, B. V. Radha
Penne Nee Vaazhga	P. Madhavan	Vijaya Chitra	K. V. Mahadevan	Jaishankar, K. R. Vijaya, Nagesh, K. A. Thangavelu
Pesum Deivam	K. S. Gopalakrishnan	Ravi Productions	K. V. Mahadevan	Sivaji Ganesan, Padmini, Sowcar Janaki, Nagesh
Ponnana Vazhvu	R. Sundaram	Poomalar Productions	K. V. Mahadevan	Jaishankar, K. R. Vijaya, Sundarrajan, Nagesh, Manorama, Puspalatha
Raja Veetu Pillai	Dada Mirasi	Mohan Productions	S. M. Subbaiah Naidu	Jaishankar, Jayalalitha, Pushpalatha, Thengai Srinivasan
Rajathi	M. Lakshmanan	Associated Artistes	K. V. Mahadevan	R. Muthuraman, Udaya Chandrika, V. K. Ramasamy, K. A. Thangavelu, B. V. Radha
Seetha	A. P. Nagarajan	Rajalakshmi Pictures	K. V. Mahadevan	Gemini Ganesan, Savitri, R. Muthuraman, K. R. Vijaya
Selva Magal	K. V. Srinivasan	Saravana Screens	M. S. Viswanathan	Jaishankar, Rajasree, Nagesh
Sabash Thambi	C. P. Jambulingham	Balan Pictures	S. M. Subbaiah Naidu	Jaishankar, Nagesh, L. Vijayalakshmi
Sri Krishnavatharam	K. Kameshwara Rao	Tarakarma Pictures	T. V. Raju	N. T. Rama Rao, Devika, Kanchana
Sundaramurthi Nayanar	K. Somu	Kandhaswamy Productions	S. M. Subbaiah Naidu	Pandarinath, Jyothi Lakshmi, B. V. Radha
Thaikku Thalaimagan	M. A. Thirumugam	Devar Films	K. V. Mahadevan	M. G. Ramachandran, Jayalalitha, S. A. Ashokan, Sowcar Janaki
Thanga Thambi	S. K. A. Chari	Prasad Art Pictures	K. V. Mahadevan	Major Sundarrajan, Ravichandran, Vanisri, Bharathi
Thangai	A. C. Tirulokchandar	Sujatha Cine Arts	M. S. Viswanathan	Sivaji Ganesan, K. R. Vijaya, Kanchana, K. Balaji, Nagesh
Thiruvarutchelvar	A. P. Nagarajan	Sri Vijayalakshmi Pictures	K. V. Mahadevan	Sivaji Ganesan, Gemini Ganesan, Savitri, Padmini, R. Muthuraman, K. R. Vijaya
Uyir Mel Aasai	C. P. Jambulingham	Ayyappan Productions	S. M. Subbaiah Naidu	Jaishankar, L. Vijayalakshmi, K. B. Sundarambal
Valiba Virundhu	Murasoli Maran	Mekala Pictures	R. Sudarsanam	Ravichandran, Bharathi, Nagesh, Chandrababu,
Vivasaayee	M. A. Thirumugam	Devar Films	K. V. Mahadevan	M. G. Ramachandran, K. R. Vijaya, C. R. Vijayakumari
