= Samikannu =

Indian actor

- Born: T.M Samikannu; 15 April 1923
- Died: 3 June 2017 (aged 94); Chennai, Tamil Nadu
- Occupation: Actor
- Years active: 1954–1996
- Notable work: Naan; Bama Vijayam; Sorgam; Savaale Samali; Pattikada Pattanama; Rajapart Rangadurai; Mullum Malarum; Vandichakkaram; Uthiripookkal
- Spouse: Visalakshi
- Children: Daughter : Ambika; Rajeswari; Son : Vivekanandan; Dayanandan

Samikannu (15 April 1923 – 3 June 2017) was an Indian actor who worked in over 400 Tamil-language films in supporting and comedy roles. One of his notable characters was 'Payapulla' in Mullum Malarum costarring Rajinikanth. He was one of the most recognizable characters in the films of director Mahendran.

== Early life ==
He started acting in plays from the age of 7. He made his film debut in Pudhu Yugam (1954). He also played the lead role of Gunasekaran in the play 'Parasakthi', before it was made into a movie in 1952, starring Sivaji Ganesan as Gunasekaran.

== Career ==
He played the emotional role of Saritha's father in the film Vandichakkaram with Sivakumar. His last film he acted in was Vaikarai Pookkal. The film released in 1996.

== Family ==
He has two sons and two daughters.

== Death ==
He died in Chennai on Saturday 3 June 2017 at the age of 95 due to ill health.

== Filmography ==
This is a partial filmography. You can expand it.

=== 1950s ===
Year	Film	Role	Notes
1954	Pudhu Yugam		Debut

=== 1960s ===
Year	Film	Role	Notes
1961	Sabaash Mapillai		
1964	Karnan		
1965	Poojaikku Vandha Malar	Textile shop owner	
1966	Chitthi	Marriage broker	
1966	Kodimalar		
1966	Selvam		
1966	Chinnanchiru Ulagam		
1967	Pesum Dheivam		
1967	Bama Vijayam		
1967	Anubavi Raja Anubavi		
1967	Naan		
1967	Penne Nee Vaazhga		
1968	Panama Pasama		
1968	Jeevanaamsam		
1968	Enga Oor Raja		
1969	Kulavilakku		
1969	Subadhinam		

=== 1970s ===
Year	Film	Role	Notes
1970	Malathi		
1971	Savaale Samali		
1971	Meendum Vazhven	Constable Irudhaya Raj	
1972	Nawab Narkali		
1972	Kurathi Magan		
1972	Enna Muthalali Sowkiyama		
1972	Pattikada Pattanama		
1973	Rajapart Rangadurai		
1973	Ponnukku Thanga Manasu		
1974	Urimai Kural		
1975	Manidhanum Dheivamagalam		
1975	Pinju Manam		
1975	Kasturi Vijayam		
1975	Aayirathil Oruthi		
1975	Paattum Bharathamum		
1976	Annakili		
1976	Paalooti Valartha Kili		
1976	Ungalil Oruthi		
1977	Pattina Pravesam		
1977	Indru Pol Endrum Vaazhga		
1977	Kavikkuyil		
1977	Palabhishegam		
1978	Shankar Salim Simon		
1978	Mullum Malarum	Payapulla	
1978	Shri Kanchi Kamakshi		
1978	En Kelvikku Enna Bathil		
1979	Veetukku Veedu Vasapadi		
1979	Uthiripookkal		

=== 1980s ===
Year	Film	Role	Notes
1980	Neer Nilam Neruppu		
1980	Poottaatha Poottukkal		
1980	Johnny		
1980	Vandichakkaram		
1980	Nenjathai Killathe	Ram's father	
1981	Nandu		
1981	Sivappu Malli		
1981	Sumai		
1981	Kudumbam Oru Kadambam		
1982	Pokkiri Raja		
1982	Metti		
1982	Echchil Iravugal		
1982	Hitler Umanath		
1982	Antha Rathirikku Satchi Illai		
1982	Sakalakala Vallavan		
1983	Dhooram Adhighamillai		
1983	Puthisali Paithiyangal		
1984	Puyal Kadantha Bhoomi		
1985	Karayai Thodatha Alaigal		
1987	Chinna Kuyil Paaduthu		
1988	Therkathi Kallan		
1988	Manasukkul Mathappu		

=== 1990s ===
Year	Film	Role	Notes
1990	Varavu Nalla Uravu		
1990	Naanum Indha Ooruthan		
1990	Vedikkai En Vadikkai		
1990	Madurai Veeran Enga Saami		
1991	Naadu Adhai Naadu		
1991	En Rasavin Manasile	Thangamuthu	
1993	Mutrugai		
1993	Uzhaippali		
1996	En Aasai Thangachi		
1996	Vaikarai Pookkal		Last movie
