= Enga Oor Raja =

- Theatrical release poster
- Directed by: P. Madhavan
- Written by: Balamurugan
- Produced by: P. Madhavan
- Starring: Sivaji Ganesan; Jayalalithaa; Sowcar Janaki
- Cinematography: P. N. Sundaram
- Edited by: R. Devarajan
- Music by: M. S. Viswanathan
- Production company: Arun Prasath Movies
- Distributed by: Vijayasri
- Release date: 21 October 1968
- Running time: 159 minutes
- Country: India
- Language: Tamil

Enga Oor Raja (transl. The king of our town) is a 1968 Indian Tamil-language drama film, directed and produced by P. Madhavan. The film stars Sivaji Ganesan, Jayalalithaa, Sowcar Janaki and M. N. Nambiar. It was released on 21 October 1968, and ran for more than 100 days at all centers of Tamil Nadu. The film was remade in Telugu as Dharma Daata (1970) and in Hindi as Dil Ka Raja (1972).

== Cast ==
- Sivaji Ganesan in a dual role as both Raja Raja Vijaya Ragunatha Sedhupathy "Sedhupathy" and his son Engineer Boopathy
- Jayalalithaa as Geetha
- Sowcar Janaki as Sivakami
- M. N. Nambiar as Rajankam
- Nagesh as Chakravarthi
- Manorama as Rani alias Venkatapuri Rani
- Kanakadurga as Vijaya
- C. Vasantha as Gowri
- Rajapandiyan as Rajankam's brother
- Senthamarai as Ramu
- Samikannu as Rathnakannu
- Master Antony as Young Boopathy
- Master Sekar as Young Chakravarthi
- Loose Mohan as Fruit Seller
- Gemini Balu as Venkatapuri Rani Secretory

== Soundtrack ==
The music was composed by M. S. Viswanathan, with lyrics by Kannadasan.

Song	Singers	Length
"Athai Meesai"	L. R. Eswari	04:25
"Ennadi Papa"	T. M. Soundararajan	04:22
"Parameshwari"	T. M. Soundararajan, P.Susheela	03:25
"Yarai Nambi Naan Poranthen"	T. M. Soundararajan	04:37
"Yezhu Kadal Seemai"	T. M. Soundararajan, P. Susheela, Kousalya	03:28

== Release ==
Enga Oor Raja was Diwali released on 21 October 1968, and distributed by Vijayasri.
