= Paattum Bharathamum =

- Theatrical release poster
- Directed by: P. Madhavan
- Story by: Balamurugan
- Produced by: P. Madhavan
- Starring: Sivaji Ganesan; Jayalalithaa; Sripriya; Vijayakumar
- Cinematography: P. N. Sundaram
- Edited by: R. Devarajan
- Music by: M. S. Viswanathan
- Production company: Arun Prasad Movies
- Release date: 6 December 1975
- Country: India
- Language: Tamil

Paattum Bharathamum (transl. Song and dance) is a 1975 Indian Tamil-language musical dance film, directed and produced by P. Madhavan. The film stars Sivaji Ganesan, Jayalalithaa, Sripriya and Vijayakumar. It was released on 6 December 1975.

== Plot ==
Shanmugasundaram and Meenakshi are an artistic couple who get broken up due to differences. Their daughter Lalitha, who sides with Shanmugam, is now an accomplished dancer. Arun meets her accidentally and mocks her skills to which she responds that anyone can become rich in a day by being lucky but it takes real talent to become an artist. Taking this as a challenge, he joins Meenakshi and learns to dance facing Lalitha in a competition defeating her. They fall in love too.

While Thiyagarajan acts like he is ok with his son's choice, he uses his nephew Kumar to drive a wedge between them by making it look like Lalitha is of poor character causing Arun to insult Shanmugasundaram. When Arun finds out the truth, it is too late and he leaves his father and the riches dedicating the rest of his life to art. How the same art becomes instrumental in reuniting them through Shanthi is the rest of the story.

== Cast ==
- Sivaji Ganesan as Ravisankar and Arun (Dual Role)
- Jayalalithaa as Lalitha
- Sripriya as Shanthi
- Vijayakumar as Kumar
- Major Sundarrajan as Thiyagarajan
- Sukumari as Meenakshi
- R. S. Manohar as Shanmugasundaram
- M. R. R. Vasu as Kuduvancherry Kuppusamy
- Manorama as Mohana
- Gopi Krishna as Dancer
- Veeraraghavan
- Samikannu as School Principal
- Pakoda Kadhar as Kundumalai

== Soundtrack ==
The music was composed by M. S. Viswanathan, with lyrics by Kannadasan. According to reports, during the filming of the song sequence “Sivakami Ada Vandhal,” set to Amritavarshini, a Carnatic raga, Jayalalithaa performed the Bharatanatyam portion in a single take due to the limited availability of colour raw film, as the production required central government permission to procure additional rolls.

Song	Singers	Length
"Deivathin Ther Eduthu"	T. M. Soundararajan	05:18
"Ulagam Neeyaadum"	P. Susheela, T. M. Soundararajan	03:11
"Maanthorana Veedhiyil"	P. Susheela, T. M. Soundararajan	03:08
"Sivakami Aada"	P. Susheela, T. M. Soundararajan	06:16
"Mazhaikkalam Varugindradhu"	Vani Jairam, M. S. Viswanathan	03:06
"My Song Is For You"	S. P. Balasubrahmanyam	03:06

== Critical reception ==
Kanthan of Kalki noted that, regardless of how good the story was, the dialogues were entertaining. Kalaiselvam of Navamani praised the acting, dialogues, music, cinematography, choreography and direction.
