= Rajapart Rangadurai =

- Poster
- Directed by: P. Madhavan
- Story by: Balamurugan
- Produced by: V. C. Guhanathan
- Starring: Sivaji Ganesan; Ushanandini
- Cinematography: P. N. Sundaram
- Edited by: R. Devarajan
- Music by: M. S. Viswanathan
- Production company: Chithramala Combines
- Release date: 22 December 1973
- Running time: 150 minutes
- Country: India
- Language: Tamil

Rajapart Rangadurai (transl. Rangadurai in King's Attire) is a 1973 Indian Tamil-language drama film, directed by P. Madhavan. It stars Sivaji Ganesan and Ushanandini. The film was released on 22 December 1973.

== Plot ==
Rajapart Rangadurai narrates the life journey of a theatre actor. He is parentless who joins the stage under V.K Ramasamy. He takes care of his brother Baskar and sister Seetha. His brother, however, is not content being poor, feigns being rich and marries Vasanthi, the daughter of an industrialist played by T.K Bhagavathi. Rangadurai's plan of getting his sister married from the dowry he would get for his brother's marriage with Alamel, daughter of industrialist Somasundaram is thrown over the bridge by his brother's action. Rangadurai marries Alamel, who was secretly in love with him, being a fan of his stage performances where he is unparalleled and well respected.

Cinema enters the society throwing the troupe into abject poverty. Somasundaram's mill workers, who are fans of Rangadurai's work, support his troupe giving him the chance to recoup. With their love, support and help, the troupe returns to vogue and they become well-off. However, Seetha dies due to ill-treatment at her in-laws while Basker is exposed at his in-laws causing trouble for both. At one stage, Somasundaram and his partner, Mohanraj, refuse to give bonus and the very factory workers who supported him are now in strike. Rangadurai decides to do a free play out of gratitude. With his star-power, Mohanraj is sure that the workers will not relent and decides to assassinate Rangadurai on stage much to the dismay of Somasundaram who does not want to see his daughter widowed as much as he hates Rangadurai.

== Cast ==
- Sivaji Ganesan as Rangadurai/Rajapart
- Ushanandini as Alamel
- M. N. Nambiar as Somasundaram
- V. K. Ramasamy as Drama teacher and drama group owner
- S. V. Ramadas as Mohanraj
- Srikanth as Baskar
- Kumari Padmini as Vasanthi
- Sasikumar as Ramu
- Jaya as Seetha
- C. K. Saraswathi as Ramu's mother
- T. K. Bhagavathi as Vasanthi's father
- V. R. Thilagam as Meenakshi
- Surulirajan as Konangi/Konangipatti
- Manorama as Chinthamani
- Senthamarai as Karuppaiya
- Poornam Viswanathan as Jilla Collector
- Samikannu as Sivakozhunthu
- Boopathyraja as Young Baskar
- Seethalakshmi as Tiruppur Kumaran Mother Drama Artist
- Angamuthu as Drama Group's
- Sedhupathy as Radhakrishnan Pillai
- Heran Ramasamy as Factory labor union's leader
- P. S. Venkadachalam Pillai as Drama Audion's
- S. N. Parvathi as Doctor (Seetha Pregnant Delivery)
- Sridevi as Valli (Young Chinthamani, Drama Actor)
- Radha Ravi as Baskar Friend, college mate
- Karuppu Subbiah as Drama Group
- Loose Mohan as Drama Group
- Pattom Sadan as Drama Group
- Pakoda Kadhar as Ittuli Drama Group

== Production ==
In the scenes where Rangadurai speaks Shakespearean English, Ganesan's voice was dubbed by Shakespeare Sundaram. Bhupathi Raja, son of the film's story writer Balamurugan portrayed the younger version of Srikanth in a devotional song.

== Soundtrack ==
The music was composed by M. S. Viswanathan, while the lyrics were written by Kannadasan.

Song	Singers
"Ammamma Thambi"	Pushpalatha
"Vanthaen Vandhanam"	T. M. Soundararajan, K. Veeramani, T. K. Kala
"Meiyatha Maan"	T. M. Soundararajan, Pushpalatha
"Madhana Maligaiyil"	T. M. Soundararajan, P. Susheela
"Ammamma Thambi" (Sad)	T. M. Soundararajan
"Jinjunika Chinnakili"	T. M. Soundararajan
"Inquilab Zindabad"	T. M. Soundararajan

== Release and reception ==
Kanthan of Kalki called it a commendable film that lays down the grammar of acting with passion. Navamani praised the acting, dialogues, cinematography, music and direction.

== Re-release ==
A digitally restored version was released in mid-2017, and ran for over 100 days theatrically.
