= Deiva Thai =

1964 film by P. Madhavan

- Theatrical release poster
- Directed by: P. Madhavan
- Screenplay by: R. M. Veerappan; T. N. Balu; K. Balachander (dialogues)
- Story by: Nanabhai Bhatt
- Produced by: R. M. Veerappan
- Starring: M. G. Ramachandran; B. Saroja Devi; M. N. Nambiar; S. A. Ashokan
- Cinematography: P. N. Sundaram
- Music by: Viswanathan–Ramamoorthy
- Production company: Sathya Movies
- Distributed by: Emgeeyaar Pictures
- Release date: 18 July 1964
- Running time: 175 minutes
- Country: India
- Language: Tamil

Deiva Thai (transl. Divine Mother) is a 1964 Indian Tamil-language film, produced and co-written by R. M. Veerappan, directed by P. Madhavan and starring M. G. Ramachandran. It was released on 18 July 1964 and became one of the most successful Tamil films of the year.

== Plot ==
Sivagami, a widow, brings up her only son Maran, in the worship of Karunakaran, as his father had died in tragic circumstances. She hides from him for a long time, the real version of the facts. Indeed, Karunakaran, inveterate player of poker, killed a player accidentally during a game in which the player beats him by cheating, shocked to realise that he is the reason for his death, Karunakaran escapes from that quickly. Maran becomes a C.I.D. officer and settles in the new mission to dismantle the traffickers' network. It turns out that the man who heads this terrorist organisation is none other than his father, Karunakaran. Maran and the one who is called up now, Baba (alias Karunakaran), ignore each other, their family ties, except Sivagami, are in the centre of a cornelian dilemma. To choose between her husband or his son? To assure his role of faithful wife or that of an affectionate mother?

== Cast ==
- M. G. Ramachandran as C.I.D. Maran
- B. Saroja Devi as Megala
- M. N. Nambiar as Madhan
- S. A. Ashokan as Karunakaran
- S. V. Sahasranamam as D.I.G. Mohan
- Nagesh as Vidwan Sargunam
- Pandari Bai as Sivakami
- S. N. Lakshmi as Megala's grandmother
- Senthamarai as Doctor

== Production ==
K. Balachander, while working in the Accountant General's office, was offered to write the dialogues for the film by its lead actor M. G. Ramachandran. Balachander was initially reluctant, as he was more theatre-oriented, but on the insistence of his friends he decided to work on the film. The producer R. M. Veerappan convinced Balachander to write the dialogues and launched him in the silver screen business. During filming, director P. Madhavan threatened to quit due to Ramachandran's interference, but ultimately due to Veerappan's persuasion, Ramachandran continued acting in the film without interfering further. The film remained the only collaboration between Madhavan and Ramachandran.

== Soundtrack ==
The music was composed by Viswanathan–Ramamoorthy.

| Song | Singers | Lyrics | Length |
|---|---|---|---|
| "Kaathalikkaathe" | P. Susheela | Vaali | 04:02 |
| "Paruvam Pona paathaiyele" | P. Susheela | Vaali | 04:32 |
| "Moondrezhuththil En moochchirukkum" | T. M. Soundararajan | Vaali | 03:08 |
| "Indha Punnagai" | T. M. Soundararajan & P. Susheela | Vaali | 05:14 |
| "Vannakkili sonna mozhi" | T. M. Soundararajan & P. Susheela | Vaali | 03:40 |
| "Oru Pennai Paarththu" | T. M. Soundararajan | Vaali | 04:37 |
| "Unmaikku Veliyittu" | Sirkazhi Govindarajan | Alangudi Somu | 04:37 |

== Release and reception ==
Deiva Thai was released on 18 July 1964, and distributed by Emgeeyaar Pictures. The Sunday Standard wrote "Indeed, it is all a twice-told tale. And yet, the picture enthrals a section of the audience for which it is intended, thanks to the fast tempo of surroundings and director Madhavan's success in wringing the best out of the few emotional sequences despite a weak and loose script". T. M. Ramachandran wrote in Sport and Pastime, "The story may be ordinary but it is imaginatively treated". Kanthan of Kalki praised the dialogues by Balachander. It was one of the most successful Tamil films of the year.
