= Maanikka Thottil =

1974 film by P. Madhavan

- Poster
- Directed by: P. Madhavan
- Written by: Balamurugan
- Produced by: Balamurugan
- Starring: Gemini Ganesan; K. R. Vijaya
- Cinematography: P. N. Sundaram
- Edited by: R. Devarajan
- Music by: M. S. Viswanathan
- Production company: Karpagam Productions
- Release date: 2 March 1974
- Running time: 155 minutes
- Country: India
- Language: Tamil

Maanikka Thottil (transl. Ruby Cradle) is a 1974 Indian Tamil-language film directed by P. Madhavan. The film stars Gemini Ganesan and K. R. Vijaya. It was released on 2 March 1974.

== Plot ==
Businessman Ramakrishnan and assistant professor Sarada are avowed bachelors. They marry, and Sarada gives birth to five daughters. The film revolves around the problems that Ramakrishnan and Sarada have to face as parents when most of their daughters marry men of their own choice.

== Cast ==
- Gemini Ganesan as Ramakrishnan
- K. R. Vijaya as Sarada
- Shubha
- Nagesh
- V. K. Ramasamy
- Sivakumar as Bhaskar
- Srikanth
- Vijayakumar
- Sarala
- Jayakumari
- Pakoda Kadhar

== Production ==
Maanikka Thottil was written and produced by Balamurugan under Karpagam Productions, and directed by P. Madhavan. Cinematography was handled by P. N. Sundaram. Sripriya was offered to portray one of the daughters of Vijaya; however she refused as she did not want to begin her career with a small role.

== Soundtrack ==
The soundtrack was composed by M. S. Viswanathan, while the lyrics were written by Kannadasan.

Track listing
| No. | Title | Singer(s) | Length |
|---|---|---|---|
| 1. | "Samathana Maappillai" | L. R. Eswari, S. Janaki |
| 2. | "Annam Ingay" | L. R. Eswari |
| 3. | "Raajathi Petreduthal" | P. Susheela |
| 4. | "Raajathi Petreduthal" (Happy) | P. Susheela |

== Reception ==
Navamani praised the acting, dialogues and humour and noted Madhavan's direction in the film's latter part is more exciting than earlier part.
