= Mannavan Vanthaanadi =

1975 film by P. Madhavan

- Theatrical release poster
- Directed by: P. Madhavan
- Written by: Balamurugan
- Produced by: P. K. V. Sankaran; Aarumugam
- Starring: Sivaji Ganesan; Manjula
- Cinematography: P. N. Sundaram
- Edited by: R. Devarajan
- Music by: M. S. Viswanathan
- Production company: Jayaar Movies
- Distributed by: Sivaji Productions
- Release date: 2 August 1975
- Country: India
- Language: Tamil

Mannavan Vanthaanadi (transl. The King Has Arrived) is a 1975 Indian Tamil-language film, directed by P. Madhavan and written by Balamurugan. The film stars Sivaji Ganesan and Manjula. It was released on 2 August 1975. The film became a hit at the box-office, running for over 100 days in theatres.

== Cast ==
- Sivaji Ganesan as Dharmaraja/Thirumalai/Chandramohan
- Manjula as Prema
- M. N. Nambiar as Punyakodi
- Nagesh as Thalapathy/C.I.D. Sivanandam
- K. Vijayan as Muthumanickam/D.G.P. Palanivel
- Senthamarai as Police Inspector
- Premanand as Sekar
- Kallapart Natarajan as Mesthiri Ramu
- Veeraraghavan as Dr. Dharmalingam
- Gokulnath as Advocate Kutralingam
- Jayasudha as Latha
- Sukumari as Parvathi
- S. N. Lakshmi as Grandmother
- Aalam as Dancer

== Production ==
The film's title is derived from a song from Thiruvarutchelvar (1967), continuing director Madhavan's penchant for naming his films after songs. During the filming of a scene where Nambiar's character calls for his henchmen to tie up Nagesh's character, the actor improvised and called for "Madhava" and "Balamuruga", adapting the names of Madhavan and the writer Balamurugan. When Nambiar offered to reshoot the scene speaking the originally scripted names, Madhavan refused and decided the new names also be recorded during dubbing. The scene where Ganesan's character argues with Nambiar's was shot at AVM Studios.

== Soundtrack ==
The music was composed by M. S. Viswanathan.

Track listing
No.	Title	Lyrics	Singer(s)	Length
1.	"Sorgathil Kattappatta Thottil"	Kannadasan	T. M. Soundararajan	3:41
2.	"Rajasthanil"	Kannadasan	T. M. Soundararajan, L. R. Eswari	4:30
3.	"Kadhal Rajiyam Enathu"	Vaali	T. M. Soundararajan, P. Susheela	4:32
4.	"Natta Thirutha Poren"	Kannadasan	T. M. Soundararajan	4:30
Total length:				17:13

== Release and reception ==
Mannavan Vanthaanadi was released on 2 August 1975, by Sivaji Productions. The magazine Thiraivanam positively reviewed the film, giving it the label "Tharamaana padam" (classy film), appreciating Ganesan's performance and Balamurugan's writing. Kanthan of Kalki called the story ordinary, but appreciated the dialogues. The film was also reviewed by Kumudam, and Navamani.
