= Inikkum Ilamai =

- Theatrical release poster
- Directed by: M. A. Kaja
- Screenplay by: M. A. Kaja
- Story by: M. A. Kaja; M. M. Sultan
- Produced by: M. A. Kaja
- Starring: Sudhakar; Radhika; Meera
- Edited by: M. Umanath; M. Mani
- Music by: Shankar–Ganesh
- Production company: Kadayanallur Cine Arts
- Release date: 16 March 1979
- Running time: 120 minutes
- Country: India
- Language: Tamil

Inikkum Ilamai (transl. Sweet youth) is a 1979 Indian Tamil-language film produced and directed by M. A. Kaja, starring Sudhakar, Radhika and Meera. It was released on 16 March 1979. The film was Vijayakanth's debut, and he played a villain. The film received negative reviews, and failed at the box office.

== Cast ==
- Sudhakar as Suresh
- M. R. Radhika as Lakshmi
- Meera as Thulasi
- Srikanth as Anand
- V. K. Ramasamy
- Gandhimathi
- Vijayakanth as Arun
- Usilai Mani
- Pakoda Kadhar

== Soundtrack ==
The music was composed by Shankar–Ganesh.

Track listing
No.	Title	Lyrics	Singer(s)	Length
1.	"Anjaru Vayasu"	M. A. Kaja	Ramani, Vasantha	3:32
2.	"Inikkum Ilamai"	M. A. Kaja	Vani Jairam	3:03
3.	"Mana Madurayile"	Alangudi Somu	T. M. Soundararajan, S. Janaki	3:42
4.	"Maalai Mayanginal"	Alangudi Somu	P. B. Sreenivas, S. P. Sailaja	4:45
Total length:				15:02

== Reception ==
Kausikan of Kalki panned the film for its vulgarity and concluded that the film causes bitterness and anguish that so much of colour film is wasted. Naagai Dharuman of Anna praised direction, music, cinematography and humour.
