= Hitler Umanath =

1982 film by P. Madhavan

- Poster
- Directed by: P. Madhavan
- Screenplay by: Mouli
- Story by: Mahendran
- Produced by: P. V. Tholasiraman
- Starring: Sivaji Ganesan; K. R. Vijaya; Sathyaraj; Suruli Rajan
- Cinematography: P. N. Sundaram
- Edited by: Devarajan
- Music by: M. S. Viswanathan
- Production company: P.V.T. Productions
- Release date: 26 January 1982
- Country: India
- Language: Tamil

Hitler Umanath is a 1982 Indian Tamil-language drama film, directed by P. Madhavan. The film stars Sivaji Ganesan, K. R. Vijaya, Sathyaraj and Suruli Rajan. Based on Mahendran's play of the same name, it was released on 26 January 1982.

== Plot ==
A mild-mannered, gullible man named Umanath causes amusement at his workplace because his mustache bears a resemblance to that of Adolf Hitler. His wife tells him more about Hitler after he tells her of the comparisons, and inspired by Hitler’s charisma and dynamism, he becomes a leader of sorts at the workplace by adopting an attitude similar to Hitler’s, and becomes so confident and powerful in the workplace that he begins to neglect not only sleep but also his wife and daughter.

In order to get revenge against her now distant father, Umanath’s daughter marries a young man who considers Umanath his enemy. Umanath, still proud of his endeavors as a leader of the workplace, is troubled by this, and eventually as he discovers the true horrors that Hitler did, regrets emulating him and tosses away his Hitler persona in order to make amends with his family.

== Cast ==
- Sivaji Ganesan as Umanath
- K. R. Vijaya as Lakshmi
- Sathyaraj
- Suruli Rajan
- Sadhana as Umanath's daughter
- Baby Anju
- N. S. Ramji
- Satheesh
- Samikannu
- S. Ramarao
- Veeraraghavan
- Peeli Sivam
- Major Sundarrajan in Guest Appearance
- V. S. Raghavan in Guest Appearance
- Kathadi Ramamurthy in Guest Appearance
- Saroja
- Jeyachandra

== Soundtrack ==
Soundtrack was composed by M. S. Viswanathan and lyrics were written by Kannadasan & Muthulingam.

Track listing
No.	Title	Singer(s)	Length
1.	"Silai Vannam"	Vani Jairam
2.	"Nambikkaiye"	P. Susheela
3.	"Sir Ungalathan"	T. M. Soundararajan
