= Pattikada Pattanama =

1972 film by P. Madhavan

- Theatrical release poster
- Directed by: P. Madhavan
- Story by: Bala Murugan
- Based on: The Taming of the Shrew by William Shakespeare
- Produced by: P. Madhavan
- Starring: Sivaji Ganesan; Jayalalithaa
- Cinematography: P. N. Sundaram
- Edited by: R. Devarajan
- Music by: M. S. Viswanathan
- Production company: Arun Prasad Movies
- Distributed by: Sivaji Films
- Release date: 6 May 1972
- Running time: 150 minutes
- Country: India
- Language: Tamil

Pattikada Pattanama (transl. Village or Town?) is a 1972 Indian Tamil-language romantic comedy film produced and directed by P. Madhavan and written by Bala Murugan. The film stars Sivaji Ganesan and Jayalalithaa. The film deals with Kalpana, an urban woman who marries a villager Mookaiyan. After marriage, differences of opinion arise between the couple as Mookaiyan raises objections about city culture, leading to their separation. The rest of the film is whether Kalpana reforms and the couple reunite or not.

Pattikada Pattanama is based on the William Shakespeare comedy The Taming of the Shrew. It was released on 6 May 1972. The film was commercially successful, running for over 175 days in theatres, thereby becoming a silver jubilee film. It is the only black and white Tamil film to cross the ₹1 crore (US$110,000) mark in collections in the history of Tamil cinema. It also won the National Film Award for Best Feature Film in Tamil, and two Filmfare Awards South: Best Film – Tamil and Best Actress – Tamil (Jayalalithaa).

== Plot ==
Mookaiyan belongs to a well-to-do family and lives in the village Sholavandan. He is held in high esteem by the villagers for his prowess. One day, his uncle Chockalingam, Chockalingam's wife Bama and their foreign-educated daughter Kalpana come to Sholavandan to participate in the Mariamman festival. Kalpana is fascinated by Mookaiyan's prowess; her mother disapproves of Kalpana's emotional reaction while her father is happy. Bama chooses a young man of Madurai to marry Kalpana. Moved by the pleas of Chockalingam, Mookaiyan goes to the bridegroom's house and brings back Kalpana, saying that he has the right by birth to marry her.

Married life starts well for Mookaiyan and Kalpana, but before long differences arise because of their different backgrounds. At Kalpana's birthday party, Mookaiyan objects to drinking and dancing by her hippie friends. He beats Kalpana, and she leaves him to join her mother. A lawyer's notice for divorce is received. Mookaiyan futilely tries to make Bama understand the situation. The mother and daughter are adamant and Mookaiyan returns home determined to teach them a lesson.

Kalpana, having been impregnated by Mookaiyan some time earlier, gives birth to a child. In her anxiety to save Kalpana from further involvements, Bama leaves the child in an orphanage. Kalpana is shocked by this act of her mother. By the time she goes to recover the child, Mookaiyan has already taken it away. Kalpana beseeches her father to get the child from Mookaiyan. Unexpectedly, Mookaiyan comes there to deliver an invitation card for his marriage with his cousin Rakkamma. Kalpana and her parents are now repentant.

Kalpana goes alone to Mookaiyan's house and asks her husband to leap over their child and then tie the thali to another girl. To her surprise, Kalpana discovers that the marriage being celebrated is that of a different man named Mookaiyan, while her husband did no injustice to her; she falls at her husband's feet and the family reunites.

== Cast ==
- Sivaji Ganesan as Mookkaiya Servai/Mukesh
- Jayalalithaa as Kalpana
- Shubha as Rakkamma
- S. N. Lakshmi as Mookkaiya's grandmother
- Gandhimathi as Vellaiyammal's friend
- V. K. Ramasamy as Sokkalingam
- Sukumari as Bama
- M. R. R. Vasu as Minor
- Manorama as Vellaiyammal
- Senthamarai as a villager
- Samikannu as Butler Kanthasamy
- Kathadi Ramamurthy as the rickshaw man
- Pakoda Kadhar as Puliyotharai
- Pattom Sadan as Thivitti
- Veeraragavan as Rathnam
- Papji as Sankar

== Production ==
Pattikada Pattanama was produced and directed by P. Madhavan, and based on the William Shakespeare comedy The Taming of the Shrew. The film's title was derived from a song from Mattukkara Velan (1970). Malayalam actress Sukumari appeared as the mother of Jayalalithaa in the film, despite being older than Jayalalithaa by only a few years. Manorama, in portraying her character, spoke in Madurai dialect. Cinematography was handled by P. N. Sundaram and the editing by R. Devarajan. The film's final length was 4,395 metres (14,419 ft).

== Soundtrack ==
The soundtrack was composed by M. S. Viswanathan, and lyrics were written by Kannadasan. The song "Adi Ennadi Rakkamma" is set in the Carnatic raga known as Shanmukhapriya. Rajakavi played the pambai for the song. It was well received and remains a cult classic. The song was later remixed by D. Imman in Vaadaa (2010). D. Karthikeyan of The Hindu writing about T. M. Soundararajan mentioned that his "folksy number Ennadi Rakkamma Pallakku from Pattikada Pattanama still makes people go crazy with its rustic beats and beautiful rendition and the song is a must in cultural festivals in Madurai". The song "Kettukodi" was remixed by Kavi Periyathambi in Pandi Oliperukki Nilayam (2012).

Track listing
No.	Title	Singer(s)	Length
1.	"Ambikaiye Easwariye"	T. M. Soundararajan	4:24
2.	"Adi Ennadi Rakkamma"	T. M. Soundararajan	2:50
3.	"Adi Ennadi Rakkamma" (sad)	T. M. Soundararajan	3:37
4.	"Kettukodi Urumi"	T. M. Soundararajan, L. R. Eswari	4:27
5.	"Muthu Solai"	P. Susheela	3:47
6.	"Nalvazhthu Naan Soluvaen"	T. M. Soundararajan	3:29
Total length:			22:34

== Release and reception ==
Pattikada Pattanama was released on 6 May 1972, and distributed by Sivaji Films. The film became a commercial success, running for over 175 days in theatres, thereby becoming a silver jubilee film. Politician K. Kamaraj praised the film, saying it demonstrated the need to practice one's culture and the traditions of "one wife for one husband". The Tamil magazine Ananda Vikatan in a review dated 28 June 1972, praised Ganesan's energetic performance and the outdoor cinematography, but called the film a usual old wine in new bottle story. The film won two Filmfare Awards South: Best Film – Tamil and Best Actress – Tamil (Jayalalithaa), and the National Film Award for Best Feature Film in Tamil.

== Bibliography ==
- Dhananjayan, G. (2014). Pride of Tamil Cinema: 1931–2013. Blue Ocean Publishers. OCLC 898765509.
- Ganesan, Sivaji; Narayana Swamy, T. S. (2007) [2002]. Autobiography of an Actor: Sivaji Ganesan, October 1928 – July 2001. Sivaji Prabhu Charities Trust. OCLC 297212002.
- Sundararaman (2007) [2005]. Raga Chintamani: A Guide to Carnatic Ragas Through Tamil Film Music (2nd ed.). Pichhamal Chintamani. OCLC 295034757.
