= Chitra Pournami =

Chitra Pournami may refer to:

- Chitra Pournami (film)
- Chitra Pournami (festival)
