= Manidhanum Dheivamagalam =

1975 film by P. Madhavan

- Theatrical release poster
- Directed by: P. Madhavan
- Screenplay by: Balamurugan
- Story by: Mullapudi Venkata Ramana
- Produced by: Chinna Annamalai; Arunachalam
- Starring: Sivaji Ganesan; Sowcar Janaki; Ushanandini
- Cinematography: P. N. Sundaram
- Edited by: R. Devarajan
- Music by: Kunnakudi Vaidyanathan
- Production company: Vijayavel Films
- Release date: 11 January 1975
- Country: India
- Language: Tamil

Manidhanum Dheivamagalam (transl. Even a human can become a god) is a 1975 Indian Tamil-language drama film, directed by P. Madhavan. The film stars Sivaji Ganesan, Sowcar Janaki, Ushanandini, Shubha and Sukumari. A remake of the 1969 Telugu film Buddhimantudu, it was released on 11 January 1975.

== Plot ==
Kumaraiya is a temple priest in a village, living with his wife Valli and younger brother, Sundaram. Kumaraiya is a believer of god, he is very much respected by villagers and believes that he encounters mystic experiences whenever he sees Sundaram is a non-believer. Troubles will plague him after he finds out that Sundaram has not only been creating problems for Dharmalingam the village head, but has also fallen in love and wants to marry Vijaya, the daughter of Dharmalingam's sister. Taking this as an advantage, Dharmalingam separates Kumaraiya and Sundaram and an old ruined house of their grandfather is given to Sundaram as his share. Sundaram modifies and establishes a school in it. Before Kumaraiya could even attempt to resolve these issues, the keys of the temple are taken away from him by Dharmalingham, and he can no longer pray nor converse with Lord. Things come to a boil after he is told that Sundaram has forcibly taken the keys, and Dharmalingam has stolen all the temple's jewellery, when they are searching for it a treasure of Kumaraiya and Sundaram's ancestors is found. Kumaraiya says he will use the treasure for development and Sundaram argues that it is the school which will lead to progress and not the temples. The rest of the story is about who wins the bet.

== Cast ==
- Sivaji Ganesan as Kumaraiya and Sundaram (dual role)
- Sowcar Janaki as Valli
- Ushanandini as Vijaya
- V. K. Ramasamy as Kanakku Pillai
- M. R. R. Vasu as Dharmalingam
- Sukumari as Kaveri
- Sasikumar as Kannan
- Shubha as Kalyani
- C. K. Saraswathi as Sundari
- M. Bhanumathi as Annakili
- Kathadi Ramamurthy as Gopal
- Veeraraghavan as Village Officer (V.O)
- Samikannu as Vathiyar Vadivel
- I.S.R as Marriage Broker

== Production ==
The song "Vaazhkaiye Bodhai" was shot at Srinivasa Agricultural farm at Poonamallee.

== Soundtrack ==
The music was composed by Kunnakudi Vaidyanathan, with lyrics by Kannadasan. The song "Paal Pongum" is set in Hamsadhvani raga.

Song	Singers	Length
"Paal Pongum"	T. M. Soundararajan, P. Susheela	04:25
"Vaazhkkaiye Bothai"	T. M. Soundararajan	03:35
"Vetrivel Vellumada"	Sirkazhi Govindarajan, T. M. Soundararajan	04:27
"Kaavalukku Velundu"	Sirkazhi Govindarajan	04:41
"Ennada Thamizh Kumara"	Sirkazhi Govindarajan	04:55

== Reception ==
Kanthan of Kalki appreciated the film for the cast performances and cinematography but criticised the story.
