= Vietnam Veedu =

1970 film by P. Madhavan

- Poster
- Directed by: P. Madhavan
- Written by: Sundaram
- Based on: Vietnam Veedu by Sundaram
- Produced by: Sivaji Ganesan
- Starring: Sivaji Ganesan; Padmini
- Cinematography: P. N. Sundaram
- Edited by: R. Devarajan
- Music by: K. V. Mahadevan
- Production company: Sivaji Productions
- Release date: 11 April 1970
- Running time: 164 minutes
- Country: India
- Language: Tamil

Vietnam Veedu (transl. Vietnam House) is a 1970 Indian Tamil-language drama film, directed by P. Madhavan and written by Sundaram. The film stars Sivaji Ganesan and Padmini, with Nagesh, K. A. Thangavelu, Srikanth, M. Bhanumathi and Rama Prabha in supporting roles. Produced by Sivaji Productions, it is based on Sundaram's play of the same name. The film was released on 11 April 1970 and became a commercial success. It won the Tamil Nadu State Film Award for Best Film. The film was remade in Telugu as Vintha Samsaram (1971) and in Kannada as Shanthi Nivasa (1988).

== Plot ==
"Prestige" Padmanabhan Iyer, the manager of a reputed company, lives with his wife Savithri, sons Sridhar and Murali, and a daughter. He is famous for living with prestige and is a keen observer of status in all matters. Sridhar is married while Murali is looking for a job. With his hard earned money, Padmanabhan buys his ancestral house, sold earlier due to poverty and names it "Vietnam Veedu" (Vietnam House) because of the constant tiffs among the family members, similar to the Vietnam War. His major problem is that he is unable to come to terms with his children's behaviour. He retires from his job, is unable to accept the situation, and gets worried about how his sons will manage the family. Added to this, they spoil his "Prestige" image.

Sridhar accepts bribes at his workplace. He is arrested by the police after a search of their home and is subsequently fired. Murali takes a loan from a moneylender and does not repay it. Hence, the moneylender lands up at Vietnam Veedu and demands repayment from Padmanabhan. The neighbours come to know of these happenings and mock him for living with false prestige. Padmanabha feels dejected; only Savithri empathises with him. He fears that after his death, his children will not take good care of their mother.

Padmanabhan's constant worry leads to a serious medical problem; his family doctor advises him to avoid stressful situation. Padmanabhan undergoes a surgery after which the doctor says that though he is fine now, he should avoid stress, as he has a weak heart. Now all the family members are reconciled with each other and take good care of him. Padmanabhan soon receives a letter from his previous employer offering him the post of director, for which he would be required to go abroad for training. Reading this, he is overjoyed that he is still revered by many for his ethics and honesty, but due to the resultant excitement he dies.

== Cast ==
- Sivaji Ganesan as "Prestige" Padmanabhan Iyer
- Padmini as Savithri
- Nagesh as Murali
- K. A. Thangavelu as Panjabi Iyer
- Srikanth as Sridhar
- V. S. Raghavan as Justice Ranganathan Iyer
- S. V. Ramadas as Nandhagopal
- V. Gopalakrishnan as Balaji
- Rama Prabha as Mala
- Padma as Akila
- M. Bhanumathi as Sumathi
- Vijayan as Swaminathan
- Maali as Balaji's assistant
- Subbiah as Muruga
- Pakoda Kadhar as the soda supplier
- Senthamarai as the church father

== Production ==
Vietnam Veedu was the first full-length play written by Sundaram, and intended for the United Amateur Artistes (UAA) troupe, co-founded by his mentor Y. G. Parthasarathy. After writing the script, he approached Parthasarathy, who was uninterested in the play being staged. It later caught the attention of Sivaji Ganesan who, impressed with the script, decided to stage it through his Sivaji Nataka Manram troupe. The play was inaugurated in 1965, and became a resounding success; Sundaram earned the title of the play as the prefix to his name. Ganesan later bought the rights to adapt the play for the screen. According to Venkatesh Chakravarthy, Regional Director and HOD-Direction at the LV Prasad Film & TV Academy, Chennai, the plot is based on Arthur Miller's play Death of a Salesman. The closing text added to the screen was, "Idhu padam alla, paadam" (This is not a film, this is a lesson) rather than the usual "Vanakkam" (Welcome).

== Soundtrack ==
The music was composed by K. V. Mahadevan with lyrics by Kannadasan. The song "Palakkattu Pakkathile" is set in Madhyamavati raga, it was remixed in Yaaradi Nee Mohini (2008). The song "Un Kannil Neer Vazhindhaal" is set in Kapi raga.

| Song | Singers | Length |
|---|---|---|
| "Paalakkaattu Pakkathile" | T. M. Soundararajan, P. Susheela | 03:53 |
| "Un Kannil Neer Vazhindhaal" | T. M. Soundararajan | 03:59 |
| "Oh My Lady" | A. L. Raghavan, L. R. Eswari | 03:29 |
| "Endrum Pudhidhaaga...."; Ulagatthile Oruvan Ena | P. Susheela, Soolamangalam Rajalakshmi, A. L. Raghavan | 06:29 |

== Release and reception ==
Vietnam Veedu was released on 11 April 1970. Ananda Vikatan appreciated the way the bonding between Ganesan and Padmini was depicted. The film was a commercial success, running for over 100 days in theatres. It also won the Tamil Nadu State Film Award for Best Film.

== Legacy ==
Vietnam Veedu is included with other Ganesan films in Yettavathu Ulaga Athisayam Sivaji (Sivaji, the Eighth Wonder of the World), a compilation DVD featuring Ganesan's "iconic performances in the form of scenes, songs and stunts" which was released in May 2012.

== Bibliography ==
- Dhananjayan, G. (2011). The Best of Tamil Cinema, 1931 to 2010: 1931–1976. Galatta Media. OCLC 733724281.
- Ganesan, Sivaji; Narayana Swamy, T. S. (2007) [2002]. Autobiography of an Actor: Sivaji Ganesan, October 1928 – July 2001. Sivaji Prabhu Charities Trust. OCLC 297212002.
- Rajadhyaksha, Ashish; Willemen, Paul (1998) [1994]. Encyclopaedia of Indian Cinema. British Film Institute and Oxford University Press. ISBN 0-19-563579-5.
