= Ayodhya (1975 film) =

1975 film

- Directed by: P. N. Sundaram
- Screenplay by: Thoppil Bhasi
- Story by: Vempati Sadasivabrahmam
- Produced by: Pavamani
- Starring: Prem Nazir; Raghavan; Adoor Bhasi; Sankaradi; Sreelatha Namboothiri
- Cinematography: P. N. Sundaram
- Edited by: G. Venkittaraman
- Music by: G. Devarajan
- Production company: Prathap Chithra
- Release date: 15 August 1975
- Country: India
- Language: Malayalam

Ayodhya is a 1975 Indian Malayalam-language social melodrama film, directed by P. N. Sundaram and produced by Pavamani. The film stars Prem Nazir, Raghavan, Adoor Bhasi, Sankaradi and Sreelatha Namboothiri. It is a remake of the 1950 Telugu film Samsaram.

== Plot ==
The film centers on a large joint family upended by the cruelty of a malicious stepmother.

== Cast ==
- Prem Nazir as Narayanan
- Adoor Bhasi as M. K. Muthalali
- Sankaradi as Sarasamma
- Sreelatha Namboothiri
- Raghavan as Madhavankutty
- Bahadoor as Jayaraman
- K. R. Vijaya as Lakshmi
- Meena as Jayaraman's Mother
- Rani Chandra as Kamalam
- Master Raghu as Gopi
- Manavalan Joseph
- T. S. Muthaiah
- Paravoor Bharathan
- Krishnadas
- T.R Omana
- Philomina
- Shobha
- Baby Santhi
- Kedamangalam Ali
- Ragava Menon
- Suresh

== Soundtrack ==
The music was composed by G. Devarajan, with lyrics by P. Bhaskaran.

Song	Singers
"ABCD Chettan"	Kishore Kumar
"Amme Vallaathe Vishakkunnu"	L. R. Eswari, Latha Raju
"Kalabhathil Mungivarum"	K. J. Yesudas, P. Madhuri
"Putharikoythappol"	P. Jayachandran, P. Madhuri, Chorus
"Raaman Sreeraaman"	P. Jayachandran
"Saumithriyumathu Kettu"	P. Madhuri
"Vandi Vandi"	P. Jayachandran, P. Madhuri, Chorus
"Vishakkunnu Vishakkunnu"	Latha Raju, L. R. Anjali
