= Vaikarai Pookkal =

- Poster
- Directed by: E. Mu. Vetrivalan
- Written by: E. Mu. Vetrivalan
- Produced by: M. Sengole; K. Balaji; R. Krishna Murthi; T. Kumar; S. Saleth Sowri
- Starring: Raja; Rajashree; Ponvannan; Annam
- Cinematography: D. Magibalan
- Edited by: B. Lenin; V. T. Vijayan
- Music by: Devendran
- Production company: Navachitra Cine Arts
- Release date: 26 January 1996
- Running time: 125 minutes
- Country: India
- Language: Tamil

Vaikarai Pookkal (transl. Dawn flowers) is a 1996 Indian Tamil-language romantic drama film directed by E. Mu. Vetrivalan. The film stars Raja, Rajashree, Ponvannan and newcomer Annam, with Shanmugasundaram, Samikannu, A. K. Veerasamy, Karan and Tharini playing supporting roles. It was released on 26 January 1996.

== Plot ==
Many years ago, in the village Rasarasanpatti, Nallathambi (Ponvannan) who was from a poor family fell in love with Maari (Tharini) who was from a wealthy family. Her brother Vellaisamy Gounder (Shanmugasundaram), the village chief, was against their love and humiliated him for being poor. Thereafter, Nallathambi married a lower-caste woman and Vellaisamy Gounder who strictly followed the caste system forced them to live outside their village. His wife (Varalakshmi) then died during childbirth.

Back to the present, Nallathambi's son Soori (Ponvannan) is a vagabond smuggling sandalwood in Kolli Malai. Deivanai (Rajashree) and Dhamayanthi (Annam) are sisters and they are the relatives of Vellaisamy Gounder. Deivanai and the village doctor Raja (Raja) fall in love with each other while Soori is still in love with his childhood sweetheart Dhamayanthi. In the meantime, Vellaisamy Gounder's son Shankar (Karan) who studied in the city returns to his native village and rapes a mentally ill village woman.

Raja and Deivanai eventually disclose their love affair to Vellaisamy Gounder and when he asks about Raja's caste, Raja refuses to tell him, therefore, Vellaisamy Gounder refuses to marry them. Deivanai then marries(Rajkanth) who has been fraudulently married to many women and the groom is arrested just after the marriage. Shankar was behind this scam and he now wants to marry her sister Dhamayanthi. Thereafter, Vellaisamy Gounder disowns his son Shankar for raping a mentally ill woman and decides to take care of the victim, and Vellaisamy Gounder finally understands that being caste-oriented was stupid. The film ends with Raja and Deivanai falling in love again and Dhamayanthi accepting Soori's true love.

== Cast ==
- Raja as Raja
- Rajashree as Deivanai
- Ponvannan as Soori and Nallathambi
- Annam as Dhamayanthi
- Shanmugasundaram as Vellaisamy Gounder
- Samikannu as Villager
- A. K. Veerasamy as Soori's adoptive father
- Karan as Shankar
- Tharini as Mari
- S. Saleth Sowri
- Murali Krishna
- Yuvan Swang as Shankar's friend
- Aarthi as Raasi
- Regina as Nila
- Rajkanth as Groom
- Pasi Sathya as Soori's adoptive mother
- Varalakshmi as Vellaisamy Gounder's wife

== Soundtrack ==
The soundtrack was composed by Devendran.

All lyrics are written by E. Mu. Vetrivalan.

Track listing
| No. | Title | Singer(s) | Length |
|---|---|---|---|
| 1. | "Uyir Vazhgiren" | S. P. Balasubrahmanyam | 4:19 |
| 2. | "Mannane Endhan" | Mano, Anuradha Sriram | 4:29 |
| 3. | "Thean Sinthidum" | S. Janaki | 2:54 |
| 4. | "Andha Nilavukku Macham Eruka" | Malgudi Subha | 4:53 |
| 5. | "Uyir Vazhgiren" | K. S. Chithra | 4:13 |
| 6. | "Othaya Rettaya" | Gangai Amaran | 4:29 |
| Total length: | | | 25:17 |

== Reception ==
The Hindu wrote, "The harmful effects of caste considerations form the theme of Navachitra Cine Arts' Vaigarai Pookal, the stage atmosphere prevalent right through the movie robbing it of value, if any".
