= Anbalippu =

1969 film directed by A. C. Tirulokchandar

- Theatrical release poster
- Directed by: A. C. Tirulokchandar
- Written by: Aaroor Dass (dialogues)
- Screenplay by: A. C. Tirulokchandar
- Story by: A. C. Tirulokchandar
- Produced by: S. Gandhiraj
- Starring: Sivaji Ganesan; B. Saroja Devi; Vijayanirmala; Jaishankar
- Cinematography: Thambu
- Edited by: B. Kanthasamy
- Music by: M. S. Viswanathan
- Production company: Kamala Movies
- Distributed by: Sivaji Productions
- Release date: 1 January 1969
- Running time: 148 minutes
- Country: India
- Language: Tamil

Anbalippu (transl. Gift) is a 1969 Indian Tamil-language film, directed by A. C. Tirulokchandar. The film stars Sivaji Ganesan, B. Sarojadevi, Vijayanirmala and Jaishankar. It was released on 1 January 1969, and was a hit at the box office.

== Plot ==
Velu, a passionate and principled young man, returns to his village after completing his education in agriculture. He is determined to modernize farming practices and uplift the lives of local farmers, challenging outdated traditions and exploitative landlords. Velu falls in love with Valli, a spirited village girl who supports his vision. Conflict arises when Velu’s progressive ideas clash with the interests of Vasudevan, a powerful and corrupt landlord (played by M. N. Nambiar). The film explores Velu’s struggle to implement scientific farming methods, fight social injustice, and win the trust of the villagers. Meanwhile, personal tensions brew as Meena (Vijayanirmala) and Raja (Jaishankar) add layers of romance and rivalry to the plot.

== Cast ==
- Sivaji Ganesan as Velu
- B. Saroja Devi as Valli
- Vijayanirmala as Meena
- Jaishankar as Raja
- Pandari Bai as Raja's mother
- M. N. Nambiar as Vasudevan
- V. K. Ramasamy as Neelamegam Pillai
- T. R. Ramachandran as Nayar
- Nagesh as Shanmugam
- Sachu as Chandra
- Karuppu Subbiah as Thangam
- Senthamarai as Veerasamy
- Geethanjali as Dancer
- Pakoda Kadhar as Shanmugam's sidekick
- Loose Mohan as the buyer

== Soundtrack ==
Music was composed by M. S. Viswanathan and music were written by Kannadasan.

No.	Title	Music	Length
1.	"Theru Vanthathu Pol"	T. M. Soundararajan	3:45
2.	"En Vesha Porutham"	T. M. Soundararajan, Sirkazhi Govindarajan	4:44
3.	"Gopalan Enge Undo"	T. M. Soundararajan, L. R. Eswari, P. Susheela, Sirkazhi Govindarajan & Tharapuram Sundararajan	3:45
4.	"Vallimalai Maankutty"	T. M. Soundararajan, P. Susheela	4:11
5.	"Yeai Ennaku Therium"	L. R. Eswari	4:21
6.	"Madhulam Pazhathukku"	P. B. Srinivas, P. Susheela	4:22
Total length:			25:08
