= Usha Nandini =

Indian actress

- Born: Usha Devi; 1951 (age 74–75); Kamaleswaram, Trivandrum, Travancore-Cochin, India
- Education: Bachelor in Law
- Occupation: Actress
- Years active: 1967–1980
- Spouse: Mariappan
- Children: 3

Usha Nandini is an Indian actress who has appeared in South Indian films. She was a prominent lead actress during the 1970s in Malayalam films. She has also acted in Tamil films.

== Early life ==
Ushanandini was born as Usha Devi to K. G. Raman Pillai and Saraswathi in 1949 at Kamaleshwaram, Trivandrum, Travancore-Cochin, India. She has a Bachelor of Arts degree.

== Career ==
She made her Malayalam film debut in 1967 with Aval, a great success at the box office. She had acted as heroine to Sivaji Ganesan in many Tamil movies like Ponnunjal, Gowravam, Rajapart Rangadurai, Manithanum Deivamagalam and Ennai Pol Oruvan. Nagarame Nandi, Olavum Theeravum, Aa Chithrasalabham Parannotte are the few among the important characters she played.

== Personal life ==
She is married to a successful businessman, S. Mariappan. She has three daughters, Preethi, Sajni and Keerthana, and two granddaughters.

== Partial filmography ==
=== Malayalam ===
- Yakshagaanam (1976)
- Criminals (Kayangal) (1975)
- Sathyathinte Nizhalil (1975)
- Pattaabhishekam (1974)
- Check Post (1974)
- Ashwathi (1974)
- Police Ariyaruthu (1973)
- Periyar (1973)
- Kaamuki (1971)
- Makane Ninakku Vendi (1971)....Mary
- Jalakanyaka (1971)
- Aa Chithrashalabham Parannotte (1970)
- Olavum Theeravum (1970)
- Padunna Puzha (1968)
- Aval (1967)
- Nagarame Nandi (1967)

=== Tamil ===
- Malathi (1970) as Chandra
- Veettukku Oru Pillai (1971) as Ponni
- Shakthi Leelai (1972) as Lord Parvathi
- Ponnunjal (1973) as Valli
- Gauravam (1973) as Radha
- Rajapart Rangadurai (1973) as Alamel
- Ponvandu (1973) as Sathyabama
- Athaiya Mamiya (1974) as Usha
- Thaai Veetu Seedhanam (1975) as Radha
- Manidhanum Dheivamagalam (1975) as Vijaya
- Ennai Pol Oruvan (1978) as Usha
