= M. Bhanumathi =

Indian actress (1946–2013)

- Born: 1946
- Died: 4 February 2013 (aged 66–67); Teynampet, Chennai, Tamil Nadu
- Occupations: Actress, Classical dancer
- Years active: 1965 - 2013
- Children: Venkadalakshmi (daughter)
- Relatives: Vazhuvoor B. Ramaiyah Pillai
- Awards: Kalaimamani Awards

M. Bhanumathi (1946 – 4 February 2013) was an Indian actress, who was active in Tamil cinema during the latter 20th century. She was well known for playing negative and supporting roles. She acted in more than 100 films in Tamil, Malayalam and Kannada and some television series.

== Personal life ==
Bhanumathi had been living with her only daughter Venkatalakshmi at Teynampet, Poyas Road in Chennai. She had been suffering from jaundice and was under treatment for many months before she died at the age of 67, on 4 February 2013.

== Other works ==
Bhanumathi worked along with Sivaji Ganesan in Sivaji Nataka Mandram, where she was part of Jahangir, Kaalam Kanda Kavingnan, Neethiyin Nizhal, Vietnam Veedu and Vengaiyin Maindhan. and Major Sundarrajan's NSN Theatre, actor Sivakumar says, She was the heroine of almost all over hit plays such as Achchaani, Appavi, Delhi Mappillai, and Sondham, and also she done shows with the actors likes of Cho, Jaishankar, V. Gopalakrishnan, V. S. Raghavan and Shesatri.

== Filmography ==
Year	Title	Role	Language	Ref.
1965	Nee	Cameo Appearance	Tamil	
1966	Kumari Penn		Tamil	
1968	Poovum Pottum	Kamala	Tamil	
1968	Thillana Mohanambal	Nurse Mary	Tamil	
1968	Thirumal Perumai	Goddess Lakshmi	Tamil	
1968	Neelagiri Express	Dancer	Tamil	
1969	Akka Thangai	Bhanumathi	Tamil	
1969	Annaiyum Pithavum		Tamil	
1969	Deiva Magan	Nirmala's friend	Tamil	
1969	Nirai Kudam	Chithra	Tamil	
1969	Thulabharam	Dancer	Tamil	
1970	CID Shankar	Sujatha Rani	Tamil	
1970	Engirundho Vandhaal	Mohana	Tamil	
1970	Kadhal Jothi		Tamil	
1970	Nizhalattam	Madhavi	Malayalam	
1970	Raman Ethanai Ramanadi	Sumathi	Tamil	
1970	Sorgam		Tamil	
1970	Vietnam Veedu	Sumathi	Tamil	
1971	Thirumagal	Bhanu	Tamil	
1972	Agathiyar	Kakkai Padiniyaar	Tamil	
1972	Idho Enthan Deivam		Tamil	
1972	Enna Muthalali Sowkiyama		Tamil	
1972	Thiruneelakandar	Kalavathi	Tamil	
1972	Ashirvadham		Tamil	
1973	Komatha En Kulamatha	Mohana	Tamil	
1973	Valli Deivanai		Tamil	
1974	Penn Ondru Kanden		Tamil	
1974	Athaiya Mamiya	Chandra	Tamil	
1974	Ore Satchi		Tamil	
1974	Samayalkaran		Tamil	
1974	Tiger Thathachari		Tamil	
1975	Manidhanum Dheivamagalam		Tamil	
1975	Vaazhnthu Kaattugiren	Lakshmi	Tamil	
1976	Vazhvu En Pakkam	Priya	Tamil	
1977	Avan Oru Sarithiram		Tamil	
1977	Murugan Adimai		Tamil	
1981	Kadavulin Theerpu		Tamil	
1987	Koottu Puzhukkal		Tamil	
1990	Geethanjali		Malayalam	
1992	Thambi Pondatti		Tamil	
2011	Sagakkal	Devasena's grandmother	Tamil	

=== Stage plays ===
- Achchaani
- Appavi
- Delhi Maappillai
- Jahangir
- Neethiyin Nizhal
- Kaalam Kanda Kavingnan
- Sondham
- Vengaiyin Maindhan
- Vietnam Veedu

=== Television serials ===
She acted in two dozens of TV series

year	Name	Role	Note	Ref(s)
2000-2001	Ramany VS Ramany Part II	Mrs. Ramany's mother	Produced by Minbimbangal of veteran director K Balachandar, telecasted inRaj TV	
2001-2003	Anni	Valliammai	Sun TV	
2005-2007	Roja	Janaki	Jaya TV	
2003-2005	Adugiran Kannan		Sun TV	
2003-2005	Anandham	Saradha	Sun TV	
2006-2008	Chellamadi Nee Enakku		Sun TV	
2007-2010	Megala	Thilakavathi's mother	Sun TV	
2008	Thiruppavai			
2010	Anupallavi		Sun TV	
2012	Vellai Thamarai		Sun TV	
