= Ennai Pol Oruvan =

- Theatrical release poster
- Directed by: T. R. Ramanna
- Written by: Sakthi T. K. Krishnasamy
- Produced by: T. R. Chakravarthi
- Starring: Sivaji Ganesan; Saratha; Ushanandini; Aalam
- Cinematography: M. A. Rahman
- Edited by: T. R. Srinivasalu
- Music by: M. S. Viswanathan
- Production company: Sri Vinayaka Pictures
- Release date: 18 March 1978
- Country: India
- Language: Tamil

Ennai Pol Oruvan (transl. A Man Like Me) is a 1978 Indian Tamil-language action drama film directed by T. R. Ramanna and written by Sakthi T. K. Krishnasamy. A remake of Bengali film Tasher Ghar (1957), the film stars Sivaji Ganesan in dual roles, alongside Saratha, Ushanandini and Aalam. Though announced in 1973, it was released on 18 March 1978, and performed above average at the box office.

== Plot ==
A narrative of double identity, deception, and moral redemption, the plot centers on two lookalikes with completely contrasting lives: Sekar (Sivaji Ganesan), a respectable, wealthy businessman, and Sundaramoorthy (Sivaji Ganesan), a village youth struggling to get by.

When a network of treacherous enemies and scheming Manager led by Sabapathy (R. S. Manohar) and Malpractice partner M. R. R. Vasu plot to eliminate Sekar and Unknowingly his vast property, circumstances force Sundaramoorthy to step into Sekar’s shoes. As Sundaramoorthy attempts to outsmart the villains while managing Sekar's complex household and personal relationships, a series of thrilling twists, emotional conflicts, and high-stakes confrontations unfold. Ennaipol Oruvan remains a classic testament to Sivaji Ganesan’s unmatched versatility in double roles.

== Cast ==
- Sivaji Ganesan as Rajasekar (alias) Sekar and Sundaramoorthy
- Saratha as Lakshmi
- Ushanandini as Usha
- R. S. Manohar as Sabapathy
- M. R. R. Vasu as Namachivayam
- S. V. Ramadas as Velu
- Suruli Rajan as Usha's father
- Aalam as Vimala
- V. Nagayya as Sundaramoorthy's father
- Kumari Rukmani as Sekar's mother
- Sasikumar as Usha's brother
- Usharani as Sundaramoorthy's sister
- Master Giri as Mohan
- Baby Sumathi as Shanthi
- Ennathe Kannaiah as Aasari Arulprakasam
- Typist Gopu as Aadiyapatham
- Senji Krishnan as Soosai
- Loose Mohan as Loorthsamy
- S. R. Prabhakar as the psychology doctor
- Comedy Shanmugam as Shanmugam
- Pushpamala as Alamel

== Production ==
Ennai Pol Oruvan was announced in 1973. It finished production in the mid-1970s, but released only in 1978. The film's similarities to Dharisanam (1970) were noted as both films revolve around lookalikes who are not related.

== Soundtrack ==
The music was composed by M. S. Viswanathan. The song "Velaale Vizhikal" is in Madhyamavati raga.

Song	Singers	Lyrics	Length
"Velaale Vizhikal"	T. M. Soundararajan, P. Susheela	Kannadasan	03:05
"Thangangale Naalai Thalaivargale"	T. M. Soundararajan	Kannadasan	03:04
"Izhu Izhu"	T. M. Soundararajan, L. R. Eswari	Kannadasan	03:36
"Aanattam Pennattam"	T. M. Soundararajan, Saibaba	Vaali	03:35
"Mounam Kalaigiradhu"	T. M. Soundararajan	Vaali	02:58
"I AM Lighttil" (Poyem Song's)	Saibaba	Vaali	00:47
