= Chitra Pournami (film) =

1976 film directed by P. Madhavan

- Poster
- Directed by: P. Madhavan
- Written by: Balamurugan
- Produced by: R. M. Subramaniyan; K. R. Srinivasan; N. Nagasubramaniyan
- Starring: Sivaji Ganesan; Jayalalithaa; C. R. Vijayakumari; R. Muthuraman
- Cinematography: P. N. Sundaram
- Edited by: R. Devarajan
- Music by: M. S. Viswanathan
- Production company: Sri Bhuvaneswari Movies
- Release date: 22 October 1976
- Country: India
- Language: Tamil

Chitra Pournami (transl. The full moon in the month of Chithirai) is a 1976 Indian Tamil-language film, directed by P. Madhavan and written by Balamurugan. The film stars Sivaji Ganesan, Jayalalithaa, R. Muthuraman and C. R. Vijayakumari. It was released on 22 October 1976.

== Plot ==
Sengodan's parents are murdered by their zamindar and his sister gets separated from him on Chitra Pournami day. He vows vengeance on the same day and attempts to take the zamindar's life every year on that day. Several years later, he plans to kill the zamindar, but is shocked upon realising that his sister is now the landlord's cherished and beloved daughter-in-law leading a peaceful life.

Sengodan falls in love with the zamindar's daughter and marries her. He now has to decide which is greater: revenge or his present relations. Though he keeps tilting towards vengeance and the zamindar continues in different ways to get rid of him manipulating his relationship with his daughter as well as his daughter-in-law, he slowly softens. When the climatic moment arrives where the zamindar's life is in his hands, he hears his child crying upon being birthed and changes his mind letting the zamindar live as he does not want his child to suffer the way he did without a father.

== Cast ==
- Sivaji Ganesan as Sengodan
- Jayalalithaa as Rani
- Vijayakumari as Vijaya / Durga
- R. Muthuraman as Kumar
- Major Sundarrajan as Vaithiyar
- R. S. Manohar as Jameendar
- Nagesh as Chinnamalai Jameendar
- Jayakumari as Ramba
- Senthamarai as Kadamban
- Heran Ramasamy as Bhairava

== Production ==
Chitra Pournami was directed by P. Madhavan, written by Balamurugan, and produced by R. M. Subramaniyan, K. R. Srinivasan and N. Naga Subramaniyan under Sri Bhuvaneswari Movies. Cinematography was handled by P. N. Sundaram, and the editing by R. Devarajan. P. A. Saleem worked as the choreographer, and the film's final cut measured 3,968 metres (13,018 ft). Another film with the same title began production in the mid-1960s before being shelved.

== Soundtrack ==
The music was composed by M. S. Viswanathan, and the songs were written by Kannadasan.

| Song | Singers |
|---|---|
| "Senthoora Netri Pottin" | T. M. Soundararajan, P. Susheela |
| "Vandhalum Vandhandi Raja" | T. M. Soundararajan, P. Susheela |
| "Ennadi Chinnak Kutti Potta Pulli Saridhana" | T. M. Soundararajan |
| "Kalam Undu Paruvam Undu" | L. R. Eswari |
| "Neeyum Vaazha Vendum" | Vani Jairam |
