= Sabatham =

- Theatrical poster
- Directed by: P. Madhavan
- Story by: Bala Murugan
- Starring: K. R. Vijaya; Ravichandran; T. K. Bhagavathi; Nagesh
- Cinematography: P. N. Sundaram; A. Somasundaram
- Edited by: R. Devarajan
- Music by: G. K. Venkatesh
- Production company: Devanayaki Films
- Release date: 14 April 1971
- Running time: 136 minutes
- Country: India
- Language: Tamil

Sabatham (/səbəθəm/ transl. Challenge) is a 1971 Indian Tamil-language romantic comedy drama film, directed by P. Madhavan and written by Bala Murugan. Music was by G. K. Venkatesh. The film stars K. R. Vijaya, Ravichandran, Nagesh and T. K. Bhagavathi, with V. K. Ramasami and Anjali Devi in supporting roles. It was released on 14 April 1971.

== Plot ==
Sivakami makes a gentle challenge to her father-in-law, as to how she should manage her problems in the household.

== Cast ==
- K. R. Vijaya as Sivakami
- Ravichandran as Muthu
- T. K. Bhagavathi as Selva Nayagam and Durai Singam
- Nagesh as Shanmugam
- V. K. Ramasamy as Rangaiya
- S. V. Sahasranamam as Valli Muthu
- Anjali Devi as Rajeswari
- Pandari Bai as Lakshmi
- Neelu
- K. R. Indira Devi as Yesotha
- Indra
- C. R. Rajakumari
- Bhavani
- Sridevi as Krishnan
- L. Vijayalakshmi as Draupadi

== Production ==
The film features a play based on the Mahabharata, where Sridevi plays Krishna.

== Soundtrack ==
Music was composed by G. K. Venkatesh and lyrics were written by Kannadasan. The song "Thoduvandhenna Thendralo Malargalo" was inspired in part by the Hindi song "Woh Hain Zara Khafa Khafa" from Shagird (1967), and attained popularity. The song "Aattathai Aadu Puliyudan" also attained popularity.

Songs	Singers	Length
"Aadum Alaigalil Neethi" (Mahabharatham)	S. Janaki	08:20
"Thoduvathenna Thendralo"	S. P. Balasubrahmanyam	03:45
"Nenjukku Neethi Undu"	Sirkazhi Govindarajan, L. R. Eswari	
"Aattathai Aadu Puliyudan"	L. R. Eswari, A. L. Raghavan	04:17
