= En Kelvikku Enna Bathil =

1978 film by P. Madhavan

- Poster
- Directed by: P. Madhavan
- Written by: Balamurugan
- Produced by: T. K. Gopinath
- Starring: Rajinikanth; Vijayakumar; Sripriya; M. N. Nambiar
- Cinematography: P. N. Sundaram
- Edited by: R. Devarajan
- Music by: M. S. Viswanathan
- Production company: Arun Prasad Movies
- Release date: 9 December 1978
- Running time: 146 minutes
- Country: India
- Language: Tamil

En Kelvikku Enna Bathil (transl. What is the answer to my question?) is a 1978 Indian Tamil-language action drama film directed by P. Madhavan and written by Balamurugan. The film stars Rajinikanth, Vijayakumar, Sripriya and M. N. Nambiar. It revolves around a man seeking to get revenge on his uncle for duping his father. The film was released on 9 December 1978 and emerged a success.

== Plot ==
Saravana and Muruga are brothers whose father was duped by their uncle Sivaraman, who borrowed a large sum of money but failed to return it after his business flourished. Their father is left in a miserable condition and the brothers are separated with Muruga growing up to become a coward and Saravana, a criminal who is arrested. When Saravana is released after some years, he is determined to avenge his father's dignity and reunite with his brother.

== Cast ==
- Rajinikanth as Saravana
- Vijayakumar as Muruga
- Sripriya as Rosy and Alamelu
- M. N. Nambiar as Sivaraman
- Manorama as Chinthamani
- Y. G. Mahendran as servant of Sivaraman
- C. K. Saraswathi as Muruga's aunt
- T. M . Samikannu as Samikannu
- Peeli Sivam as Nallasivam
- V. S. Raghavan as Muruga's uncle
- Suruli Rajan as Chinthamani's love interest
- Ceylon Manohar as Raja
- Veeraraghavan as Alamelu's stepfather
- Vijayachandrika as school headmistress

== Production ==
En Kelvikku Enna Bathil was directed by P. Madhavan, written by Balamurugan and produced by T. K. Gopinath under Arun Prasad Movies. Cinematography was handled by P. N. Sundaram, and the editing by R. Devarajan. The film's title was derived from a song from Uyarndha Manithan (1968). Vijayakanth was initially chosen for the role of Rajinikanth's younger brother; however he was removed due to not being good at dialogue delivery. The role went to Ceylon Manohar.

== Themes ==
En Kelvikku Enna Bathil, like many Rajinikanth films of the late 1970s and 1980s, had metamorphosis and vengeance as its dominant narrative.

== Soundtrack ==
The soundtrack was composed by M. S. Viswanathan.

Title	Singer(s)	Lyrics	Length
"My Name Is Nobody"	S. P. Balasubrahmanyam	Kannadasan	4:19
"Ore Vaanam"	B. S Sasirekha, T. K. Kala	Muthulingam	4:30
"Ennave Murugappa"	T. M. Soundararajan, L. R. Eswari	Kannadasan	4:14
"Oottavandi Mavarsa"	L. R. Eswari	Kannadasan	4:28

== Release and reception ==
En Kelvikku Enna Bathil was released on 9 December 1978. The film was a commercial success, and with that Rajinikanth "carved out for himself a niche in vendetta roles". Kausikan of Kalki praised the acting of Rajinikanth, Sripriya and Vijayakumar and cinematography and concluded saying the one who has carried the story and the incidents without any hesitation is P. Madhavan who is experienced and has directed many successful films, our answer to the question raised by him is it is a populist film featuring Rajinikanth. The Hindu wrote, "Rajnikant in a turbulent role has given a powerful performance and dominates this action-packed film".

== Bibliography ==
- Dharap, B. V. (1978). Indian Films. Motion Picture Enterprises.
