= Naan Aanaiyittal =

1966 film

- Theatrical release poster
- Directed by: Chanakya
- Screenplay by: R. M. Veerappan
- Story by: Manjula Nedumaran
- Produced by: R. M. Veerappan
- Starring: M. G. Ramachandran; K. R. Vijaya; B. Sarojadevi
- Cinematography: P. N. Sundaram
- Edited by: C. P. Jambulingam
- Music by: M. S. Viswanathan
- Production company: Sathya Movies
- Release date: 4 February 1966
- Running time: 182 minutes
- Country: India
- Language: Tamil

Naan Aanaiyittal (transl. If I Order) is a 1966 Indian Tamil-language film directed by Tapi Chanakya and produced by R. M. Veerappan. The film stars M. G. Ramachandran, K. R. Vijaya and B. Sarojadevi. It was released on 4 February 1966.

== Plot ==
Pandiyan, a member of a notorious robber gang, wishes to bring about a change in his gang and turn them towards a righteous path. Velaiya, a member of that gang, commits a murder and frames Pandiyan. To escape the law, Pandiyan disguises himself as a rich man's long-lost son and stays in his house, while Velaiya and the rich man's manager, Kumar, try to out him.

== Cast ==
- M. G. Ramachandran as Pandiyan/Sundaram/Basha/Selvanayagam (Selva)
- K. R. Vijaya as Mala
- B. Saroja Devi as Kannagi / Kaveri
- M. N. Nambiar as Velaiya
- R. S. Manohar as Kumar
- S. A. Ashokan as Chezhiyan
- Nagesh as Appu the Great
- Karikol Raju as Mala's relation
- C. R. Parthiban as IG
- O. A. K. Thevar as Muthuveeran
- Sedhupathy as Kanagarathnam

== Production ==
- Naan Aanaiyittal was directed by Tapi Chanakya and produced under Sathya Films by R. M. Veerappan, who also wrote the screenplay. The dialogue was written by Vidwan Lakshmanan and N. Pandurangan. Cinematography was handled by P. N. Sundaram, with editing by Jambulingam. The film's title was derived from a song from Enga Veettu Pillai (1965).
- Initially, while acting in the film "Naan Aanaiyittal" due to the lack of a good rapport between MGR and B. Saroja Devi, MGR producer R. M. Veerappan insisted that K. R. Vijaya’s name be listed first among the heroines and that her photographs be featured prominently in the film's promotional Page's.
- The song " Kodukka Kodukka Inbam Pirakkume " was intended for a sequence where K. R. Vijaya—who is secretly in love with her cousin M.G.R. but keeps her feelings to herself—daydreams about him. In the scene, her friend Sarojadevi asks hare to my hip pain apply oilment to her aching waist; as K. R. Vijaya massages the Sarojadevi Hip pain in, the action involves gentle punching to relieve the pain, and the two actresses sing the song together during this interaction.
- However, due to the film's excessive runtime, this song—set against such a pleasant backdrop—was ultimately excluded from the final cut.

== Soundtrack ==
The music was composed by M. S. Viswanathan.

Song	Singers	Lyrics	Length
"Thaaimel Aanai"	T. M. Soundararajan	Vaali	03:32
"Pirandha Idam"	L. R. Eswari	Alangudi Somu	02:52 / 02:37 (film version)
"Paattu Varum"	T. M. Soundararajan, P. Susheela	Vaali	03:46 / 04:46 (film version)
"Nalla Velai"	T. M. Soundararajan	Vaali	04:11 / 04:12 (film version)
"Megangal Irundu" (Odi Vanthu)	Sirkazhi Govindarajan, P. Susheela	Alangudi Somu	03:35 / 04:17 (film version)
"Naan Uyara"	T. M. Soundararajan, P. Susheela	Vaali	03:43 / 05:39 (film version)
"Kodukka Kodukka"	P. Susheela, M. S. Viswanathan	Vidwan V. Lakshmanan	03:11
"Thaaimel Aanai" (film version)	T. M. Soundararajan & chorus	Vaali	05:29

== Release and reception ==
Naan Aanaiyittal was released on 4 February 1966. It was initially scheduled to release on 14 January 1966, during Pongal, but was pushed back to allow the release of another Ramachandran film, Anbe Vaa. The Indian Express wrote that the film "has all the ingredients to make it appealing to the masses" and praised the performances of Ramachandran and Saroja Devi. T. M. Ramachandran of Sport and Pastime gave a positive review appreciating the film's message, also praising Vidwan Lakshman's dialogue as "sparkling" and M. S. Viswanathan's music as "pleasing," although still being critical of Chanakya's direction, saying it "could have been more inspiring".
