= Vazhvu En Pakkam =

- Poster
- Directed by: Krishnan–Panju
- Written by: Mahendran
- Produced by: S. Karuppusamy; S. S. K. Sannasi; S. S. K. Sankaralingam; S. S. K. Ganesan; S. S. K. Murugan
- Starring: R. Muthuraman; Lakshmi; Srikanth; S. Varalakshmi
- Cinematography: S. Maruti Rao
- Edited by: B. Panjabi; K. R. Ramalingam
- Music by: M. S. Viswanathan
- Production company: S. S. K. Films
- Release date: 2 November 1976
- Country: India
- Language: Tamil

Vazhvu En Pakkam (transl. Life is on my side) is a 1976 Indian Tamil-language romantic drama film, directed by Krishnan–Panju and written by Mahendran. Soundtrack was composed by M. S. Viswanathan. The film stars Lakshmi, R. Muthuraman, Srikanth and S. Varalakshmi playing lead roles, with Manorama, Suruli Rajan, K. Balaji, Vennira Aadai Moorthy and M. Bhanumathi in supporting roles. It was released on 2 November 1976.

== Plot ==
A social reformist, Raju, marries a mute girl, Saraswathy. But her mother, Vijayalakshmi, doesn't accept as her daughter in law. Later with her allies she plans to get rid of her mute daughter in law. They send her to Delhi soon after her husband goes for a meeting. But fate has it, the train she travel meets with an accident and all the passengers are said to be dead. But to their dismay Saraswathy returns. At the sametime Raju returns from Delhi. The family is dumbfounded as Saraswathy is able to speak. Soon Saraswathy starts taking control of the house and its members. This forms the rest of the story on how she reforms the house members.

== Cast ==
- R. Muthuraman as Raju
- Lakshmi as Saraswathy and Usha
- Srikanth as Kannan
- S. Varalakshmi as Vijayalakshmi
- M. Bhanumathi as Priya
- K. Balaji as Moorthy
- Manorama as Seetha
- Suruli Rajan as Neelakantan
- Senthamarai as Sathyanathan
- Vennira Aadai Moorthy as Muthu
- Aparna as Hema

== Soundtrack ==
Music was composed by M. S. Viswanathan and lyrics were written by Kannadasan.

| Song | Singer | Length |
|---|---|---|
| "Veenai Pesum" | K. J. Yesudas & B. S. Sasirekha | 4:26 |
| "Thirupathi Malaiyil" | M. S. Viswanathan | 4:13 |
| "Theerthathil Vizhutha Vandu" | L. R. Eswari & Saibaba | 4:19 |
| "Theerthathil Vizhutha Vandu" | P. Susheela | 4:12 |

== Reception ==
Kanthan of Kalki praised Lakshmi's dual role performance but criticised the comedy and story.
