= Ponnunjal (film) =

- Poster
- Directed by: C. V. Rajendran
- Story by: Sakthi T. K. Krishnasamy
- Produced by: K. S. Kutralingam
- Starring: Sivaji Ganesan; Ushanandini
- Cinematography: S. Maruthi Rao
- Edited by: T. R. Srinivasalu
- Music by: M. S. Viswanathan
- Production company: Gomathy Shankar Pictures
- Release date: 15 June 1973
- Country: India
- Language: Tamil

Ponnunjal (transl. The Golden Oonjal) is a 1973 Indian Tamil-language film, directed by C. V. Rajendran and produced by K. S. Kutralingam. The film stars Sivaji Ganesan and Ushanandini. It was released on 15 June 1973.

== Cast ==
- Sivaji Ganesan as Muthu
- Ushanandini as Valli
- R. Muthuraman as Minor Manickam
- M. N. Nambiar as Ponnan
- S. V. Sahasranamam as Sivalingam
- Sriranjani as Sengamalam
- S. V. Subbaiah as Komberi Devan
- Gandhimathi as Velaee
- K. A. Thangavelu as Pethaperumal
- Cho as Singaram
- Manorama as Veeramma
- A. Sakunthala as Sundari
- S. A. Kannan as Village Panchayat Head Leader
- A. K. Veerasamy as Panchayat Head Group's
- A. Veerappan as Sappani
- Usilai Mani as Iyer

== Soundtrack ==
The music was composed by M. S. Viswanathan.

Song	Singers	Lyrics	Length
"Muthucharam Soodi Varum"	T. M. Soundararajan, B. Vasantha	'Nellai' Arulmani	02:58
"Agaya Pandhalile"	T. M. Soundararajan, P. Susheela	Kannadasan	03:26
"Varuvan Mogana"	S. Janaki	Kannadasan	03:21
"Nalla Kariyam"	T. M. Soundararajan, P. Susheela	Kannadasan	02:55
"Nigar Edhu Enakku"	T. M. Soundararajan, P. Susheela	Kannadasan	03:42
"Agaya Pandhalile" (Sad)	T. M. Soundararajan, P. Susheela	Kannadasan	01:50
"Inbathil Malartha"	L. R. Eswari	Selvabharathi	02:20

== Reception ==
Kanthan of Kalki praised the acting of star cast, Sakthi Krishnaswamy's dialogues and the film's title but panned the humour for being unfunny and screenplay for being dragged.
