= Chinna Kuyil Paaduthu =

1987 film by P. Madhavan

- Directed by: P. Madhavan
- Written by: Balamurugan
- Produced by: P. M. Venkatprasanth; P. M. Arunkumar
- Starring: Sivakumar; Ambika; K. Bhagyaraj
- Cinematography: P. N. Sundaram
- Edited by: R. Devarajan
- Music by: Ilaiyaraaja
- Production company: Karpagam Films
- Release date: 24 July 1987
- Running time: 152 minutes
- Country: India
- Language: Tamil

Chinna Kuyil Paaduthu (transl. A small cuckoo is singing) is a 1987 Indian Tamil-language comedy drama film directed by P. Madhavan and written by Bala Murugan. The film stars Sivakumar, Ambika and Master Tinku. It was released on 24 July 1987.

== Plot ==
Forced by his eight-year-old son, Raju, a widower marries Geetha by hiding his first marriage. When Geetha learns about his first marriage, she calls off her marriage and leaves him.

== Cast ==
- Sivakumar as Raja
- K. Bhagyaraj as Babu (cameo appearance)
- Master Tinku as Ravi, Raja's Son
- Ambika as Geetha
- Ilavarasi as Vasanthi, Raja's Colleague
- Manorama as Geetha's Mother
- Senthil as Santhana Pottu Shanmugam
- Cho as Ramaswamy, Raja's Colleague
- Jeevitha as Lakshmi, Raja's First Wife
- Kumarimuthu as Babu's Father
- K. Surya Kala as Sivakami, Babu's Mother
- Madhu Mohan as The Manager
- Samy Kannu as Aarumugam
- Loose Mohan as Kabali
- Kovai Sarala (cameo appearance)

== Soundtrack ==
Music was composed by Ilaiyaraaja.

Songs	Singer	lyricist	Length
"Unnai Naane"	K. S. Chithra	Vaali	04:42
"Chithirai Mathathu"	K. S. Chithra, Malaysia Vasudevan	Muthulingam	04:14
"Chinna Kuyil Oru"	Ilaiyaraaja	Muthulingam	04:26
"Kannumani"	S. Janaki	Gangai Amaran	03:39
"Appavukku Paiyan"	Ilaiyaraaja	Ilaiyaraaja	02:29
"Chinna Kuyil Paaduthu Title Music	Instrumental		02:23

== Critical reception ==
On 7 August 1987, V. S. Thomas of The Indian Express wrote that the film "is an attempt at entertainment with plenty of sentimental incidents tagged together but the effort is not crowned with success as there is a sense of abruptness and artificiality throughout". Balumani of Anna praised the acting, dialogues, cinematography, music and direction.
