= Manasukkul Mathappu =

1988 film directed by Robert–Rajasekar

- Poster
- Directed by: Robert–Rajasekar
- Screenplay by: Robert–Rajasekar
- Based on: Thalavattam by Priyadarshan
- Produced by: D. Premakumari; B. Saraswathi
- Starring: Prabhu; Saranya; Lissy
- Cinematography: Robert–Rajasekar
- Edited by: R. T. Annadurai
- Music by: S. A. Rajkumar
- Production company: Ownland Arts
- Release date: 24 June 1988
- Country: India
- Language: Tamil

Manasukkul Mathappu (transl. Sparklers in the heart) is a 1988 Indian Tamil-language film written and directed by Robert–Rajasekar. The film stars Prabhu, Saranya and Lissy, with Sarath Babu and Senthamarai in supporting roles. It is a remake of the 1986 Malayalam film Thalavattam which was inspired by the 1975 film One Flew Over the Cuckoo's Nest which in turn was an adaptation of the 1962 novel of the same name by Ken Kesey. The film was released on 24 June 1988 and Prabhu won the Cinema Express Award for Best Actor – Tamil.

== Plot ==
Shekar becomes mentally ill after his girlfriend Anitha dies because of an electric short circuiting accident during a rock concert. He is admitted into an institution managed authoritatively by Nagaraj. With the help of a young doctor Geetha, who is Nagaraj's daughter, and an old friend Raja, Shekar slowly regains his memory and mental equilibrium. He and Geetha soon fall in love. But Nagaraj has already arranged Geetha's marriage with someone else, so he opposes the lovers. When Nagaraj finds that Geetha and Shekar are adamant, he performs a surgery (lobotomy) on Shekar that puts him into a state of coma. Raja feels that death would be preferable to vegetative life and kills Shekar. He confronts Nagaraj, confesses to the euthanasia and tries to kill him for ruining Shekar's life, but Geetha suddenly shoots her father dead. She is later admitted into the same institution as a patient.

== Cast ==
- Prabhu as Shekar
- Saranya as Geetha
- Lissy as Anitha
- Sarath Babu as Raja
- Senthamarai as Nagaraj
- Janagaraj as Vasu
- Nassar as Babu
- Neelu
- Sachu as Nurse Mary
- Samikannu as a mental patient
- Kumarimuthu as a mental patient
- Swaminathan as a mental patient

== Production ==
The film was launched at Prasad Studios along with song recording. Suhasini Maniratnam was originally chosen as lead actress.

== Soundtrack ==
Soundtrack was composed by S. A. Rajkumar, who also wrote the lyrics.

| Song | Singers | Length |
|---|---|---|
| "Adadoi Mettu" | Malaysia Vasudevan | 03:46 |
| "Oh Ponmaan Kuyil" | S. P. Balasubrahmanyam | 04:19 |
| "Poonthendrale" (Duet) | P. Jayachandran, Sunandha | 04:16 |
| "Poonthendrale" (Solo) | K. S. Chithra | 04:46 |
| "Vaa Kanmani" | S. A. Rajkumar | 04:28 |
| "Yaar Yaar Inge" | S. P. Balasubrahmanyam | 03:25 |

== Release and reception ==
Manasukkul Mathappu was released on 24 June 1988. On 1 July 1988, The Indian Express wrote, "With some films you don't want to say much about the performances though they might be good or sort of as much as you want to write home about the bright idea the scenarist had of disposing of a heroine he wanted to kill by electrocuting her while she is playing the electric guitar or the masterstroke of the filmmaker in cutting from the shriek of the hero in the shock chamber to a happy times song-dance sequence till then obscured by the iron curtain of amnesia." Jayamanmadhan of Kalki appreciated Prabhu's performance, and felt that though there was no newness in the songs, they were still worth listening to. Prabhu won the Cinema Express Award for Best Actor – Tamil at the 9th Cinema Express Awards.
