= Love in Canada =

- Theatrical release poster
- Directed by: S. Ramanathan
- Written by: Abrar Alvi (dialogues); Yogesh Gaud; Sharon Prabhakar (lyrics)
- Screenplay by: Sheoraj Singh
- Story by: Tyagi S Dayal
- Produced by: Tyagi Janeshwar Dayal
- Starring: Jeetendra; Vinod Mehra; Moushumi Chatterjee; Shelley Homick
- Cinematography: Robert Ryan
- Edited by: James Lahti
- Music by: Hemant Kumar
- Production company: Tyagi Films Ltd
- Release date: 27 June 1979
- Running time: 136 mins
- Country: India
- Language: Hindi

Love in Canada is a 1979 Indian Hindi-language romance film directed by S. Ramanathan, and produced by Tyagi Janeshwar Dayal. It stars Jeetendra, Vinod Mehra, Moushumi Chatterjee, Shelley Homick in lead roles and music composed by Hemant Kumar.

== Cast ==
- Jeetendra as Dev
- Vinod Mehra as Dr. Ameeth
- Moushumi Chatterjee as Seema
- Shelley Homick as Lisa
- Asrani as Bansi
- Iftekhar as Mr. Khanna
- Aruna Irani as Aruna
- Indrani Mukherjee as Sonba
- Ranjna Sachdeva as Lata

== Soundtrack ==
#	Title	Singer(s)	Lyricist
1	"Humko Dena He Dharti Ma"	Mohammed Rafi, Aarti Mukherji, Hemant Kumar	Yogesh Gaud
2	"Khushiyan Unko Milti Hain"	Lata Mangeshkar	Yogesh Gaud
3	"Love's Reflections"	Sharon Prabhakar	Sharon Prabhakar
4	"Mere Yaar Tu"	Mohammed Rafi	Yogesh Gaud
5	"Rang Se"	Aarti Mukherji	Yogesh Gaud
