= Sorgam =

1970 film by T. R. Ramanna

- Theatrical release poster
- Directed by: T. R. Ramanna
- Screenplay by: Sakthi T. K. Krishnasamy
- Story by: Nannu
- Produced by: T. R. Chakravarthi
- Starring: Sivaji Ganesan; K. R. Vijaya; Rajasree; R. Muthuraman; K. Balaji
- Cinematography: Amirtham
- Edited by: T. R. Srinivasalu
- Music by: M. S. Viswanathan
- Production company: Sri Vinayaga Pictures
- Release date: 29 October 1970
- Running time: 160 minutes
- Country: India
- Language: Tamil

Sorgam (transl. Heaven) is a 1970 Indian Tamil-language film directed by T. R. Ramanna, starring Sivaji Ganesan, K. R. Vijaya, Rajasree, R. Muthuraman and K. Balaji. The film was released on 29 October 1970 and became a major success, running for over 100 days at the box office.

== Plot ==
Three graduates, Kannan, Sampath and Shankar have different values and experience completely different things in life. Shankar's only motivation is to get rich, while Kannan stays honest. Sampath however is a crook and has no qualms about ruining anyone to get what he wants. Shankar still has goodness in him which attracts Vimala as they get married.

However, once Shankar starts to work and grow rich, she sees the goodness in him slowly erode. The other two also work with him but situations put them at loggerheads. In the end, Shankar realizes that he has lost himself in his quest to become rich, changes his ways and helps the cops catch the culprits with help from Kannan and a reformed Sampath.

== Cast ==
- Sivaji Ganesan as Engineer Shankar
- K. R. Vijaya as Vimala
- Rajasree as Anjana
- K. Balaji as Engineer Sampath
- R. Muthuraman as Kannan
- R. S. Manohar as Dharmalingam/Arun
- M. R. R. Vasu as Mathrubootham/Bond/Ippi/Thevaram
- Nagesh as Engineer Gajendran/Gajini
- Sachu as Savithri/Jothi/Puppy
- Kanakadurga as Lakshmi
- V. Nagayya as Judge
- O. A. K. Thevar as Advocate
- Senthamarai as Police Inspector
- Ennatha Kannaiya as Harikrishnan
- M. Bhanumathi as Manju
- Veeraraghavan as Headmaster
- Kallapetti Singaram as Snake Charmer
- Karikol Raju as Bayilvan
- Karuppu Subbiah as Taxi owner
- I.S.R as Adiyapatham (office staff)
- Gemini Mali as Gopi (office staff)
- Samikannu as Ayyakannu (office staff)
- Sadan as Shankar's driver
- S. A. Kannan as Drama Stage Actor
- Periyar Rajavel as Drama stage Actor
- Comedy Shanmugam as (Office clerk)
- Master Ramu as Muthu (Shankar Son)

Special Appearance

- Vijayalalitha as (Dancer)
- Shabnam as (Dancer)

== Themes ==
The film features a play based on William Shakespeare's Julius Caesar where Marcus Junius Brutus murders the title character, which Ganesh Krishnamoorthy, writing for The Times of India, feels is symbolic of Balaji's character betraying Ganesan's character.

== Soundtrack ==
The soundtrack was composed by M. S. Viswanathan. The song "Ponmagal Vandhaal" was parodied in Pithamagan (2003), and remixed by A. R. Rahman in Azhagiya Tamil Magan (2007). The song's title was also used for a 2020 film.

Song	Singers	Lyrics	Length
"Ponmagal Vandhal"	T. M. Soundararajan	Alangudi Somu	03:22
"Azhagu Mugam"	Jikki, S. Janaki	Kannadasan	03:29
"Sollathe Yarum Ketal"	T. M. Soundararajan	Kannadasan	03:10
"Oru Muttharathil"	P. Susheela	Kannadasan	03:29
"Naalu Kaalu Sir"	A. L. Raghavan, L. R. Eswari, S. V. Ponnusamy	Kannadasan	03:36

== Release and reception ==
Sorgam was released on 29 October 1970, Diwali day. It was the first film to be released at Devi theatre, which was inaugurated on 23 May 1970. The Indian Express said "There are some films which try to go off the beaten track, and just when the viewer begins to say hurrah, they return to familiarity. [...] You are at a loss to discover whether the director is brave or just cunning." Despite being released alongside another Ganesan film Engirundho Vandhaal, the film was a commercial success, running for over 100 days in theatres.
