= Dil Ka Raja =

Dil Ka Raaja
- Poster
- Directed by: P. Madhavan
- Story by: Balamurugan
- Produced by: A. A. Nadiadwala
- Starring: Raaj Kumar; Waheeda Rehman; Leena Chandavarkar
- Music by: R. D. Burman
- Distributed by: AVM Productions
- Release date: 1972
- Country: India
- Language: Hindi

Dil Ka Raaja is a 1972 Bollywood action film produced by A. A. Nadiadwala and directed by P. Madhavan. It stars Raaj Kumar, Waheeda Rehman, Leena Chandavarkar in lead roles. The film was a remake of Tamil film Enga Oor Raja.

== Cast ==
- Raaj Kumar as Raja Vichitra Singh / Raj Singh "Raju" (Double Role)
- Waheeda Rehman as Laxmi Singh
- Leena Chandavarkar as Geeta
- Bindu as Rani
- Ajit as Thakur Gajendra Singh
- Indrani Mukherjee as Gauri Singh
- Jagdeep as Bajrang Singh

== Music ==
Song	Singer
"Jao Jao, Tum Bhi Jao"	Mohammed Rafi
"Sundar Ho Aisi Tum"	Mohammed Rafi
"Sundar Hoon Aisi Main"	Asha Bhosle
"Rajeshwari Parmeshwari Bagheshwari Yogeshwari"	Asha Bhosle, Mohammed Rafi
"Jinke Paas Haathi Ghoda, Unke Paas Dil Hai Thoda, Tumse Thoda"	Asha Bhosle, Mohammed Rafi, Manna Dey
