= Prathijnja =

- Directed by: P. N. Sundaram
- Written by: Melattoor Ravi Varma; Kaloor Dennis (dialogues)
- Screenplay by: Melattoor Ravi Varma
- Produced by: C. S. Unni; P. K. Chidambaran
- Starring: Prem Nazir; Srividya; Mammootty; Jagathy Sreekumar
- Cinematography: P. N. Sundaram
- Edited by: M. Umanath; M. Mani
- Music by: Ben Surendar
- Production company: Soorya Gayathri Films
- Distributed by: Soorya Gayathri Films
- Release date: 3 June 1983
- Country: India
- Language: Malayalam

Prathijnja (transl. Pledge) is a 1983 Indian Malayalam-language film, directed by P. N. Sundaram and produced by C. S. Unni and P. K. Chidambaran. The film stars Prem Nazir, Srividya, Mammootty and Jagathy Sreekumar. The film's score was composed by Ben Surendar.

== Cast ==
- Prem Nazir as Prabhu/Prabhakaran
- Srividya as Lakshmi
- Mammootty as Hamsa
- Jagathy Sreekumar as Anthappan
- Pattom Sadan as Charayam Paramu
- Prem Prakash as Police Officer
- Prathapachandran as Moosa
- Balan K. Nair as Gopalan /K. R. G. Panikkar
- Jalaja as Sainaba
- Nissam as Gunda
- P. R. Menon as Usha's father
- Silk Smitha as Dancer
- Thodupuzha Radhakrishnan as Samuel
- Shanavas as Ravindran
- Mafia Sasi as Kochumuthalali
- Santo Krishnan as Gunda

== Soundtrack ==
The music was composed by Ben Surendar with lyrics by Poovachal Khader and R. K. Damodaran.

No.	Song	Singers	Lyrics	Length (m:ss)
1	"Ekaantha Theerangale"	P. Susheela, Unni Menon	Poovachal Khader	
2	"Poonchodiyil"	K. P. Brahmanandan, C. O. Anto, Pattom Sadan	R. K. Damodaran	
3	"Yaamini Nin Chodi"	Vani Jairam	R. K. Damodaran	
