= Selvam (1966 film) =

1966 film by K. S. Gopalakrishnan

- Theatrical release poster
- Directed by: K. S. Gopalakrishnan
- Screenplay by: K. S. Gopalakrishnan
- Story by: B. S. Ramiah
- Produced by: V. K. Ramasamy
- Starring: Sivaji Ganesan; K. R. Vijaya
- Cinematography: R. Sampath
- Edited by: R. Devarajan
- Music by: K. V. Mahadevan
- Production company: V. K. R. Pictures
- Release date: 11 November 1966
- Country: India
- Language: Tamil

Selvam is a 1966 Indian Tamil-language comedy drama film written and directed by K. S. Gopalakrishnan from a story by B. S. Ramiah, and produced by V. K. Ramasamy. The film stars Sivaji Ganesan and K. R. Vijaya. It was released on 11 November 1966.

== Cast ==
- Sivaji Ganesan as Selvam
- K. R. Vijaya as Valli
- S. V. Ranga Rao as Dr. Rajan
- S. V. Sahasranamam as Boothalingam
- V. Nagayya as Kanthasamy
- M. V. Rajamma as Dhanalakshmi
- M. S. Sundari Bai as Mangalam
- Nagesh as Kathakalachebam Iyer
- Rama Prabha as Rathna
- R. Balasubramaniam as Astrologer
- Samikannu as Astrologer
- A. K. Veerasamy as Guest Appearance

== Production ==
Selvam was directed by K. S. Gopalakrishnan, who wrote the screenplay from a story by B. S. Ramiah. The film was produced by actor V. K. Ramasamy, who did not feature. It was lighter than the melodramatic films Sivaji Ganesan was previously known for starring in. The film ridicules horoscopes, astrology and superstition.

== Soundtrack ==
The music was composed by K. V. Mahadevan.

Song	Singers	Lyrics	Length
"Ennadi Ithanaivegam"	T. M. Soundararajan, P. Susheela	Alangudi Somu	04:12
"Avala Sonnal"	T. M. Soundararajan	Vaali	03:31
"Lilli Lalli Jimmi"	L. R. Eswari	Vaali	03:22
"Ondra Iranda"	T. M. Soundararajan, P. Susheela	Vaali	03:42
"Va Va Va Enakkakava"	Dharapurum Sundarrajan, K. Jamuna Rani	Vaali	03:26

== Release and reception ==
Selvam was released on 11 November 1966. Kalki criticised Gopalakrishnan's screenplay for lacking essence and direction for lacking newness, but said the dialogues had richness.
