= Senthamarai (actor) =

Indian film and stage actor

- Born: Senthamarai Kannan Thiruvenkadam; 13 April 1935; Kanchipuram, Madras Province, British India
- Died: 14 August 1992 (aged 57); Chennai, Tamil Nadu, India
- Occupation: Actor
- Years active: 1957–1992
- Spouses: Lakshmi; Kousalya Senthamarai
- Children: 3

Senthamarai was an Indian actor who acted in Tamil cinema mostly in villain roles and theatre.

== Career ==
Senthamarai was born on 13 April 1935 at Kancheepuram. His family included his father Thiruvenkadam, his mother Vedammal, and brother Kamalakannan. Thiruvenkadam died when Senthamarai was seven years old. Senthamarai acted in many stage plays along with Sivaji Ganesan and M. G. Ramachandran before entering film. In 1980's, he acted mainly in villainous roles, but also did character roles opposite many leading actors of those times.

== Family ==
Senthamarai was married to Kousalya who currently acts in Tamil serials.

== Death ==
Senthamarai died on 14 August 1992 of a heart attack.

== Filmography ==
=== 1950s ===
Year	Film	Role	Notes
1957	Mayabazar		
1958	Maalaiyitta Mangai		
1959	Nalla Theerpu		
1959	Vannakili		

=== 1960s ===
Year	Film	Role	Notes
1960	Kuravanji		
1961	Thaai Sollai Thattadhe	Inspector of police	
1961	Thayilla Pillai	Ponnan	
1963	Needhikkuppin Paasam	Blind man / Secret agent	
1963	Ratha Thilagam		
1964	Dheiva Thaai	Doctor	
1964	Thozhilali	Ganesan	
1965	Aasai Mugam	Doctor	
1967	Anubavam Pudhumai		
1967	Paaladai		
1967	Nenjirukkum Varai		
1967	Ooty Varai Uravu	Veerasamy	
1967	Thiruvarutchelvar		
1968	Galatta Kalyanam	Jambu	
1968	Thillana Mohanambal	Kadambavanam	
1969	Anbalippu	Veerasamy	
1969	Akka Thangai		
1969	Thunaivan		
1969	Nil Gavani Kadhali		
1969	Anjal Petti 520		
1969	Sivandha Mann		
1969	Shanti Nilayam		
1969	Aayiram Poi	Raja (Henchman)	

=== 1970s ===
Year	Film	Role	Notes
1970	Enga Mama	Babu	
1970	Paadhukaappu		
1970	Raman Ethanai Ramanadi	Alliyur Vallippan	
1970	Maanavan		
1970	Sorgam	Police Inspector	
1970	Vietnam Veedu	Church Father	
1971	Arunodhayam		
1971	Irulum Oliyum		
1971	Sumathi En Sundari	Station Master	
1971	Moondru Dheivangal	Police Officer	
1971	Babu		
1972	Annai Abhirami		
1972	Kasethan Kadavulada		
1972	Shakthi Leelai		
1972	Dhikku Theriyadha Kaattil	Police Inspector	
1972	Pattikada Pattanama	Villager	
1972	Mr. Sampath		
1972	Dharmam Engey		
1972	Dheivam	Kumaresan	
1972	Vasantha Maligai	Jameen property Diwan	
1972	Gnana Oli	Head of Police officer	
1972	Thavapudhalavan	Doctor	
1972	Namma Veetu Deivam		
1973	Arangetram	Nadesa Udaiyaar	
1973	Gauravam	Inspector Karunakaran	
1973	Bharatha Vilas	Ramamoorthy	
1973	Suryagandhi	Sriram	
1973	Pookkari		
1973	Rajapart Rangadurai	Karuppaiya	
1974	Thirumangalyam		
1974	Kadavul Mama		
1974	Anbai Thedi		
1974	Vani Rani	Lawyer	
1974	Thaai	Mahalingam	
1974	Naan Avanillai	Public Prosecutor	
1974	Prayachitham		
1974	Engamma Sapatham		
1975	Mannavan Vanthaanadi		
1975	Aan Pillai Singam		
1975	Cinema Paithiyam		
1975	Pattampoochi	Bashyam	
1976	Payanam	Prisoner	
1976	Thunive Thunai	Landlord Singaram	
1976	Annakili		
1976	Chitra Pournami	Kadamban	
1976	Rojavin Raja	Singapur Rasappa's Assistant	
1976	Vazhvu En Pakkam	Sathyanathan	
1977	Muthana Muthallavo		
1977	Navarathinam	Police Inspector	
1977	Kavikkuyil	Chinnaih Pillai	
1977	Chakravarthy		
1978	Andaman Kadhali	Maragatham Ungle, Jailar	
1978	Chittu Kuruvi		
1979	Kalyanaraman	Sridevi father	
1979	Naan Vazhavaippen		

=== 1980s ===
Year	Film	Role	Notes
1980	Kannil Theriyum Kathaikal		
1980	Polladhavan	Ramaiyya	
1980	Nenjathai Killathe	Mala's father	
1981	Kazhugu	Inspector of police	
1981	Nandu		
1982	Metti	Shanmugam	
1982	Thanikattu Raja		
1982	Thooral Ninnu Pochchu	Sulochana father	
1982	Azhagiya Kanne		
1982	Moondru Mugam	Egambaram	
1982	Darling, Darling, Darling	Selvam	
1983	Oru Kai Parpom	Singaram	
1983	Samayapurathale Satchi		
1983	Malaiyoor Mambattiyan	Landlord Sundaralingam	
1983	Adutha Varisu	Diwan	
1983	Ilamai Kaalangal		
1983	Thangaikkor Geetham		
1983	Thoongathey Thambi Thoongathey		
1984	Poovilangu	Raja Manikkam	
1984	Naan Mahaan Alla	Eshwaran	
1984	Thambikku Entha Ooru	Gangatharan	
1984	Naalai Unathu Naal	Dr. Nagaraj	
1984	Neengal Kettavai	Stunt Master	
1984	Madras Vathiyar		
1984	Anbulla Rajinikanth		
1984	Komberi Mookan		
1984	Vai Pandal		
1985	Unnai Vidamatten		
1985	Avan		
1985	Kaakki Sattai	Police officer	
1985	Un Kannil Neer Vazhindal	Dharmaraj	
1985	Aduthathu Albert	Alexander	
1985	Sri Raghavendrar	Tamil Poet	
1985	Neethiyin Marupakkam		
1985	Samaya Purathale Satchi		
1985	Padikkadavan	Advocate	
1986	Karimedu Karuvayan		
1986	Mythili Ennai Kaathali	Guest Appearance	
1986	Naan Adimai Illai	Shankar	
1986	Dharmam	Rajappa	
1986	Enakku Nane Needipathi	Raj	
1986	Piranthaen Valarnthaen		
1987	Shankar Guru		
1987	Chinnari Devatha		Telugu film
1987	Enga Ooru Pattukaran	Nishanti Father	
1987	Oru Thayin Sabhatham		
1987	Chinna Poove Mella Pesu	Michael	
1987	Paga Sadistha		Telugu film
1987	Neethikku Thandanai		
1987	Sattam Oru Vilayaattu	Mathappu Sundaram	
1987	Aayusu Nooru		
1987	Gramatthu Minnal		
1988	Makkal Aanaiyittal	Minister Vairavan	
1988	En Thangai Kalyani		
1988	Paarthal Pasu		
1988	Enga Ooru Kavalkaran		
1988	Veedu		
1988	Manasukkul Mathappu	Docter	
1988	Guru Sishyan	Kandhasamy	
1989	Rajanadai		

=== 1990s ===
Year	Film	Role	Notes
1990	Panakkaran	Rajni father	
1990	Periya Veetu Pannakkaran		
1990	Athisaya Piravi	Chinnasaamy	
1990	Puthu Paatu		
1991	Kumbakarai Thangaiah		
1991	Enga Ooru Sippai		
1991	Rudhra		
1992	Ilavarasan		
1992	Thaali Kattiya Raasa		
1992	Annan Ennada Thambi Ennada		
1993	Dhuruva Natchathiram		Last Movie
