= Pakoda Kadhar =

Tamil actor

‘Pakoda’ Kadhar
- Kadhar
- Died: 21 January 1998
- Occupation: Actor
- Years active: 1961-1992
- Notable work: Madras to Pondicherry, Raman Ethanai Ramanadi, Aalayam, Anbalippu
- Spouse: Mumtaz
- Children: 1

Pakoda Kadhar was an Indian actor who appeared in Tamil films (Kollywood) in comedic and supportive roles. He acted in over 200 films in the Tamil language from the 1960s, to the 1980s. He is notable for his comedian roles along with actors Nagesh, Suruli Rajan and Thengai Srinivasan. Some of his notable movies are Madras to Pondicherry, Raman Ethanai Ramanadi, Aalayam, Anbalippu, Deiveega Uravu, Kann Malar and Murugan Kaattiya Vazhi. He earned the name Pakoda Kadhar for his role in Madras to Pondicherry in which he asks for a pakoda while on a bus.

== Family ==
He has a wife Mumtaz and only son, Nagoor Maideen.

== Death ==
He died of heart disease on 21 January 1998.

== Partial filmography ==
This is a partial filmography. You can expand it.

=== 1960s ===
Year	Film	Role	Notes
1961	Pasamalar		
1962	Paarthal Pasi Theerum		
1963	Iruvar Ullam		
1964	Server Sundaram		
1965	Vazhikatti		
1966	Thiruvilaiyadal		
1966	Madras to Pondicherry	Kadhar	
1966	Petralthan Pillaiya		
1966	Avan Pithana?		
1967	Bhakta Prahlada		
1967	Ninaivil Nindraval		
1967	Aalayam		
1967	Thangai		
1968	Nimirnthu Nil		
1968	Uyira Maanama		
1968	Ninaivil Nindraval		
1968	Oli Vilakku		
1969	Kanne Pappa		
1969	Deiveega Uravu		
1969	Aayiram Poi	Ward boy	
1969	Athai Magal		
1969	Anjal Petti 520		
1969	Anbalippu		
1969	Aindhu Laksham		
1969	Ponnu Mappillai		

=== 1970s ===
Year	Film	Role	Notes
1970	Raman Ethanai Ramanadi		
1970	Anadhai Anandhan		
1970	Nilave Nee Satchi		
1970	Kanmalar		
1971	Thanga Gopuram		
1972	Bombay to Goa		Hindi
1972	Shakthi Leelai	Gopalu	
1972	Pattikada Pattanama	puliyotharai	
1973	Rajapart Rangadurai	Idlee	
1974	Thaai		
1974	Maanikka Thottil		
1974	Pillaiselvam		
1975	Dr. Siva		
1975	Ammayila Sapatham		Telugu
1975	Pinjumanam		
1975	Kasthuri Vijayam		
1976	Paalooti Valartha Kili		
1976	Thunive Thunai	Shopkeeper	
1979	Inikkum Ilamai		
1979	Gnana Kuzhandhai	Karpuram	
1979	Thaayillamal Naan Illai		
1979	Alangari		

=== 1980s ===
Year	Film	Role	Notes
1980	Sigappukkal Mookkuthi		
1980	Ellam Un Kairasi		
1987	Manithan		
1988	Manaivi Oru Mandhiri		
1988	Senthoora Poove		
1989	Samsara Sangeetham		

=== 1990s ===
Year	Film	Role	Notes
1991	Pavunu Pavunuthan		
1992	Solaiyamma		
