= Penne Nee Vaazhga =

- Theatrical release poster
- Directed by: P. Madhavan
- Written by: Balamurugan
- Produced by: P. Madhavan
- Starring: Jaishankar; K. R. Vijaya
- Cinematography: M. Karnan
- Edited by: R. Devarajan
- Music by: K. V. Mahadevan
- Production company: Vijaya Chitra
- Release date: 14 January 1967
- Country: India
- Language: Tamil

Penne Nee Vaazhga (pronounced [peɳɳeː n̪iː ʋaːɻɡa] transl. Oh woman, may you live long!) is a 1967 Indian Tamil-language film produced and directed by P. Madhavan, starring Jaishankar and K. R. Vijaya. It was released on 14 January 1967 and emerged a success.

== Cast ==
- Jaishankar
- K. R. Vijaya
- Nagesh
- K. A. Thangavelu
- Madhavi

== Soundtrack ==
The music was composed by K. V. Mahadevan, with lyrics by Vaali.

Track listing
| No. | Title | Singer(s) | Length |
|---|---|---|---|
| 1. | "Bramachari Bramachari Vazhukki" | T. M. Soundararajan, P. Susheela |
| 2. | "Kannu Mayangi Mayangi Thavicha" | T. M. Soundararajan |
| 3. | "Pollatha Punsirippu pothum" | T. M. Soundararajan, P. Susheela |
| 4. | "Uyir Nee Unakkoru Udal Naan" | P. Susheela |

== Release and reception ==
Penne Nee Vaazhga was released on 14 January 1967, during Pongal. Despite facing competition from other Pongal releases, including Thaikku Thalaimagan, Kandhan Karunai and Pattathu Rani, it became a success. Kalki lauded the film for Vijaya's performance and the innovative story.
