= Pattathu Rani =

- Theatrical release poster
- Directed by: S. Ramanathan
- Written by: Javar Seetharaman
- Starring: P. Bhanumathi; Gemini Ganesan; Kalpana
- Cinematography: G. Vittal Rao
- Edited by: Paul Duraisingam
- Music by: T. K. Ramamoorthy
- Production companies: Sunbeam and G. K. Combines
- Distributed by: Venkatachalapathy Pictures
- Release date: 13 January 1967
- Running time: 175 minutes
- Country: India
- Language: Tamil

Pattathu Rani (Crown Princess) is a 1967 Indian Tamil-language film directed by S. Ramanathan and written by Javar Seetharaman. The film stars Gemini Ganesan and Kalpana. It was released on 13 January 1967.

== Cast ==
- Gemini Ganesan
- Kalpana
- P. Bhanumathi
- K. Balaji
- Nagesh
- G. Varalakshmi

== Production ==
Pattathu Rani was produced by Sunbeam and G. K. Combines, directed by S. Ramanathan, and written by Javar Seetharaman. Cinematography was handled by G. Vittal Rao and editing by Paul Duraisingam.

== Music ==
The music was composed by T. K. Ramamoorthy, and the lyrics were written by Vaali, Alangudi Somu and Thanjaivanan.

== Release ==
Pattathu Rani was released on 14 January 1967, during the festive occasion of Pongal, and was distributed by Venkatachalapathy Pictures. Kalki criticised the film's outdated story.

== Bibliography ==
- Cowie, Peter; Elley, Derek, eds. (1977). World Filmography: 1967. Tantivy Press. ISBN 0-498-01565-3.
