= S. Ramanathan (film director) =

Indian director and producer (1929–2013)

- Born: 1929
- Died: 9 January 2013 (aged 83–84); Chennai, Tamil Nadu
- Occupations: Film director and producer
- Years active: 1951 to 1988

S. Ramanathan (1929 – 9 January 2013) was an Indian film director and producer. He began as an assistant director in Indian cinema from 1951 until 1958, and then started working as a director. In the 1970s, he worked in the Hindi film industry with Amitabh Bachchan on several occasions such as in Bombay to Goa (1972) and Mahaan (1983). Zamaanat, a project with Bachchan which had been delayed since 1996, was still awaiting release in 2014. He produced several Kannada films along with his brother Shivaram and formed the home banner "Rashi Brothers". He died on 9 January 2013 in Chennai.

== Filmography ==
India

- Naadodikal (1959)
- Shreekovil (1962)
- Shree Guruvayoorappan (1964)
- Devaalayam (1964)
- Pattathu Rani (1967)
- Ponnu Mappillai (1969)
- Iru Thuruvam (1971)
- Bombay to Goa (1972)
- Do Phool (1973)
- Sabse Bada Rupaiya (1976)
- Rangila Ratan (1976)
- Devata (1978)
- Shikshaa (1979)
- Love in Canada (1979)
- Kahani Ek Chor Ki (1981)
- Dial 100 (1982)
- Mahaan (1983)
- Faisla (1988)

Sri Lanka

- Ipadunay Aiye? (1967)
