= Pesum Deivam =

1967 film by K. S. Gopalakrishnan

- Theatrical release poster
- Directed by: K. S. Gopalakrishnan
- Written by: K. S. Gopalakrishnan
- Produced by: R. Balasubramaniam
- Starring: Sivaji Ganesan; Padmini
- Cinematography: R. Sampath
- Edited by: R. Devarajan
- Music by: K. V. Mahadevan
- Production company: Ravi Productions
- Distributed by: Santhi Pictures
- Release date: 14 April 1967
- Running time: 170 minutes
- Country: India
- Language: Tamil

Pesum Deivam (transl. Talking Deity) is a 1967 Indian Tamil-language drama film, directed by K. S. Gopalakrishnan and produced by R. Balasubramaniam. The film stars Sivaji Ganesan, Padmini, S. V. Ranga Rao and S. V. Sahasranamam. It was released on 14 April 1967. The film was remade in Kannada in 1996 as Jeevanadhi.

== Plot ==
Lakshmi, after marrying Chandru, yearns for a child. Barren for a long time, they make special arrangements with their maid to adopt her unborn child. But their happiness is short-lived when the newborn baby dies. Their sadness is overtaken soon, when Lakshmi becomes pregnant. The child is born and is healthy. Does Lakshmi's wants end there? No, the child has a special problem.... and the wants continue.

== Cast ==
- Sivaji Ganesan as Chandru
- Padmini as Lakshmi
- Sowcar Janaki as Sathyan’s wife
- Nagesh as Murali
- S. V. Ranga Rao as Thiruvenkadam
- S. V. Sahasranamam as Collector Sundaram
- Sathyan as Business man from Burma to adopt child
- V. S. Raghavan as Doctor
- Karikol Raju
- Samikannu as Lakshmi's grandfather
- Ramakrishna
- K. Kannan as Lakshmi's uncle
- Veerasamy
- G. Sakunthala as Velammal
- M. S. Sundari Bai as Ammani
- Jayabharathi as Suganthi
- Baby Rani as Babu

== Soundtrack ==
The music was composed by K. V. Mahadevan, with lyrics by Vaali. The song "Nooraandu Kaalam Vaazhga" became popular, and is frequently performed at various events in Tamil Nadu, such as birthday parties and marriages. The song "Azhagu Deivam" is set to Kanada raga.

| Song | Singers | Length |
|---|---|---|
| "Azhagu Deivam" | T. M. Soundararajan, P. Susheela | 04:53 |
| "Idhaya Oonjal" | T. M. Soundararajan, P. Susheela, P. Leela | 06:43 |
| "Naan Anuppuvadhu" | T. M. Soundararajan | 03:25 |
| "Nooraandu Kaalam Vaazhga" | Sarala, Soolamangalam Rajalakshmi, L. R. Eswari | 04:04 |
| "Pathu Maadham" | T. M. Soundararajan, P. Susheela | 04:21 |
| "Pillai Selvame" | S. Janaki | 05:16 |

== Reception ==
Kalki positively reviewed the film for Ganesan and Padmini's performances, and the music.

== Bibliography ==
- Cowie, Peter; Elley, Derek, eds. (1977). World Filmography: 1967. Tantivy Press. ISBN 0-498-01565-3.
- Sundararaman (2007) [2005]. Raga Chintamani: A Guide to Carnatic Ragas Through Tamil Film Music (2nd ed.). Pichhamal Chintamani. OCLC 295034757.
