= Muhurtha Naal =

- Theatrical release poster
- Directed by: P. Madhavan
- Written by: Balamurugan
- Produced by: P. Madhavan
- Starring: Jaishankar; K. R. Vijaya; Muthuraman
- Cinematography: A. Somasundaram
- Edited by: R. Devarajan
- Music by: K. V. Mahadevan
- Production company: Arun Prasad Movies
- Distributed by: Venkateshwara Movies
- Release date: 29 September 1967
- Country: India
- Language: Tamil

Muhurtha Naal (transl. An auspicious day) is a 1967 Indian Tamil-language film produced and directed by P. Madhavan, and written by Balamurugan. The film stars Jaishankar, K. R. Vijaya and Muthuraman. It was released on 29 September 1967, and failed at the box office.

== Cast ==
- Jaishankar as Raju
- K. R. Vijaya as the tea plantation worker
- Muthuraman as Saravana
- Nagesh
- Madhavi
- Sandhya Rani as Uma

== Soundtrack ==
The music was composed by K. V. Mahadevan. The song "Manikka Mookkuthi Madhurai" attained popularity.

Track listing
No.	Title	Lyrics	Singer(s)	Length
1.	"Manikka Mookkuthi Madhurai"	Kannadasan	P. Susheela
2.	"Nadanthathu Netru Mudinthathu"	Kannadasan	P. Susheela, L. R. Eswari
3.	"Nei Alakkum Kaikalile"	'Puthagaram' Thangarasu	T. M. Soundararajan, P. Susheela
4.	"Sooriyan Poi Chandran Vanthal"	Vaali	P. Susheela, T. M. Soundararajan
5.	"Aambala Pathi Pombala Pathi"	Vaali	A. L. Raghavan, K. Jamuna Rani

== Release and reception ==
Muhurtha Naal was released on 29 September 1967, and distributed by Venkateshwara Movies. Kalki positively reviewed the film for various aspects, including the cast performances and Madhavan's direction. Despite this, it was a box office failure.
