= Kaavalkaaran =

- Theatrical release poster
- Directed by: P. Neelakantan
- Written by: Ve. Lakshmanan; R. M. Veerappan
- Produced by: R. M. Veerappan
- Starring: M. G. Ramachandran; J. Jayalalithaa
- Cinematography: V. Ramamoorthy
- Edited by: C. P. Jambulingam
- Music by: M. S. Viswanathan
- Production company: Sathya Movies
- Release date: 7 September 1967
- Running time: 150 minutes
- Country: India
- Language: Tamil

Kaavalkaaran (transl. Protector) is a 1967 Indian Tamil-language spy action film, directed by P. Neelakantan and produced and co-written by R. M. Veerappan. The film stars M. G. Ramachandran and Jayalalithaa, with M. N. Nambiar, S. A. Ashokan, Sivakumar and Nagesh in supporting roles. It was released on 7 September 1967 and became a major success. The film was remade in Hindi as Rakhwala (1971).

== Plot ==
Mani is from a modest background. He starts working as a driver for the billionaire Maruthachalam. His employer's daughter, Susheela, falls in love with Mani. However, he seems to be constantly worried. His worries are not confine only to his job or the strange behaviour his boss, but also by a secret that her mother revealed to him about his younger brother, Chandran. Manikkam looks actively for the answers! In spite of the opposition of her father, Susheela marries Manikkam. But does she really know who Mani is or what he wants?

== Cast ==
- M. G. Ramachandran as Mani alias Manickam
- Jayalalithaa as Susheela
- Sivakumar as Chandra (alias Chandran)
- Nagesh as Gobi (alias Gobinath)
- V. K. Ramasamy as Vaithilingham
- Pandari Bai as Karpagam
- M. N. Nambiar as Maruthachalam
- S. A. Ashokan as Nagu
- Usilai Mani as Patient
- Karikol Raju as Patient
- Kallapetti Singaram as Patient
- Ennathe Kannaiah as Doctor
- Vijayarani as Gobi's lover
- Pusphamala as Pushpa
- Rangammal (uncredited role)

== Production ==
Before Kaavalkaaran began production, Ramachandran's voice had been damaged due to a gunshot to his throat caused by M. R. Radha. Despite this, Ramachandran refused others' suggestion to use a dubbing artiste and dubbed in his own voice. The song "Ninaithen Vanthai" has him and Jayalalithaa dressed as Mark Antony and Cleopatra respectively, re-enacting the William Shakespeare play Antony and Cleopatra, and later Layla and Majnun.

== Soundtrack ==
The music was composed by M. S. Viswanathan.

Track listing
| No. | Title | Lyrics | Singer(s) | Length |
|---|---|---|---|---|
| 1. | "Ninaithen Vanthai" | Vaali | T. M. Soundararajan, P. Susheela | 5:22 |
| 2. | "Mellappo Mellappo" | Vaali | T. M. Soundararajan, P. Susheela | 4:02 |
| 3. | "Adangoppuraane" | Alangudi Somu | T. M. Soundararajan | 3:00 |
| 4. | "Kaathu Koduthukettaen" | Vaali | T. M. Soundararajan | 4:23 |
| 5. | "Kattazhagu Thangamagal" | Alangudi Somu | P. Susheela | 3:05 |
| Total length: | | | | 19:52 |

== Release and reception ==
Kaavalkaran was released on 7 September 1967. The Indian Express wrote that Veerappan and Neelakantan "made the story gripping with well-punctuated romantic, dramatic and fighting scenes." Kalki called the film a flawless, entertaining film. The film became a major success, and Ramachandran considered it his ninth turning point. It won the Tamil Nadu State Film Award for Best Film.
