= Raman Ethanai Ramanadi =

1970 film by P. Madhavan

- Theatrical release poster
- Directed by: P. Madhavan
- Written by: Bala Murugan
- Produced by: P. Madhavan
- Starring: Sivaji Ganesan; K. R. Vijaya; Muthuraman
- Cinematography: P. N. Sundaram
- Edited by: R. Devarajan
- Music by: M. S. Viswanathan
- Production company: Arun Prasad Movies
- Release date: 15 August 1970
- Running time: 146 minutes
- Country: India
- Language: Tamil

Raman Ethanai Ramanadi (/rɑːmən/ transl. Raman, how many Ramans?) is a 1970 Indian Tamil-language drama film produced and directed by P. Madhavan and written by Bala Murugan. The film stars Sivaji Ganesan, K. R. Vijaya and Muthuraman. It revolves around a village bumpkin who rises to become a movie star, but his life changes following a traumatising incident.

Raman Ethanai Ramanadi was released on 15 August 1970 and became a commercial success, running for over 100 days in theatres. It won the National Film Award for Best Feature Film in Tamil. Madhavan also directed the Hindi remake Ram Tere Kitne Nam (1985).

== Plot ==
"Saappattu" Raman is a bumpkin living in the village Poongudi. Having lost his parents in his childhood, he was raised by his grandmother. One day Raman gets a seizure, falls into the village tank and almost drowns until a woman named Devaki saves him. Devaki is the younger sister of Minor Rajarathnam, a zamindar and the richest man in the village, and has just returned from Madras. Raman becomes infatuated with Devaki, who only feels affection for him because of his childish nature, which others misinterpret as love.

At night, Raman breaks into Devaki's bedroom and declares his love for her; to prove it, he jumps out of the window and survives the fall, only breaking a leg. After recovering, he visits Rajarathnam and seeks permission to marry Devaki. Rajarathnam humiliates and beats Raman up, stating that there are millionaire suitors queuing up to marry Devaki whereas Raman is poor. In response, Raman vows to become rich and marry Devaki. He then leaves to Madras looking for his fortune.

In Madras, Raman struggles to earn money while doing menial jobs. He meets his best friend Mookurinji, now a film actor known as Gopi. With his help, Raman joins the film industry. At a shooting spot a writer is looking for someone to recite a dialogue. When no one volunteers, Raman jumps in and tries to impress the writer. His recitation does not impress the writer, but his enthusiasm wins the director's favour. He soon becomes a successful movie star known as Vijayakumar.

Raman returns to Poongudi, dreaming to marry Devaki, but is shattered upon learning that she was forced to marry Muthu, a rich man, under compulsion from her brother. Heartbroken, he returns to Madras. A few days later, he finds Devaki and she tells him about the cowardly Muthu and that she left him. The reason being that after ill-treating her, he took her to a party. There his friend Balu tried to rape her and threatened to shoot anyone trying to stop him. Muthu fled for his life, forcing Devaki to knock Balu out with a vase. After hearing this, Raman offers to take care of her which she refuses.

Balu again tries to rape Devaki, who kills him this time. Devaki runs to Raman and gives him her baby daughter Sumathi to take care of her while she surrenders to the police. Using his influence, Raman helps Devaki receive a reduced sentence of five years. Meanwhile Raman brings up and educates Sumathi. Having squandered his wealth, Muthu becomes the school bus driver of Sumathi and Sumathi realises he is missing his wife. She meets his wife (her mother) at jail coincidentally. Raman is with Sumathi during this meeting but Devaki stops him from speaking. Completing her jail sentence, Devaki becomes a teacher in a small school letting Raman know of her whereabouts.

Time moves on as Sumathi goes to college, being brought up as a well mannered girl by Raman. She then falls in love with Gopi. Raman agrees to their marriage. He informs Devaki and requests her presence. When he brings Devaki home, Sumathi is absent as she has gone to a party. Raman rushes to the party and finds an attempt to rape Sumathi taking place. He fights the rapist but an attack by the rapist triggers a seizure, due to which Raman loses control and accidentally kills him. Sumathi saves Raman and brings him home by taxi. But Raman calls the police to surrender. He also reunites Muthu, who drove the taxi, with his family.

== Cast ==
- Sivaji Ganesan as "Saappattu" Raman / Vijayakumar
- K. R. Vijaya as Devaki
- Muthuraman as Muthu
- M. N. Nambiar as Minor Rajarathnam
- S. V. Ramadas as Balu
- Sudheer as Gopi
- Master Prabhakaran as young Gopi
- S. N. Lakshmi as Raman's grandmother
- M. Bhanumathi as Sumathi
- Baby Rani as young Sumathi
- Goundamani as the school bus driver (uncredited)

== Production ==
Raman Ethanai Ramanadi was produced and directed by P. Madhavan under the Arun Prasad Movies banner, and written by Bala Murugan. Cinematography was handled by P. N. Sundaram, and editing by R. Devarajan. The film's title was derived from the song from Lakshmi Kalyanam (1968). The protagonist "Saapaattu" Raman was inspired by a man Madhavan knew in his native town Walajapet. In the 1940s, Sivaji Ganesan portrayed the Maratha king Shivaji in the play Sivaji Kanda Hindu Rajyam, written by C. N. Annadurai. A portion from the play was re-enacted in the film as a story within a story with permission from Annadurai's family. Kannadasan wrote the dialogues for the portion. Ganesan's character acts in many nested films for which footage from Ganesan's films such as Parasakthi (1952), Pasamalar (1961), Paava Mannippu (1961) and Navarathri (1964) was used. This is the first film to feature Goundamani in a speaking role.

== Themes ==
Film historian Mohan Raman notes that the film has many references to Ganesan's personal life. He believes the scene, where Raman asks a character if he really looks like he is ignorant of politics, was Ganesan's retort to the political party Dravida Munnetra Kazhagam since they had previously questioned his knowledge in politics. Historian G. Dhananjayan considered the film to be similar to Server Sundaram (1964) because it features "an ordinary and innocent man becoming a film hero overnight for the sake of his lady love", with the difference being "the love of [Raman] for Devaki and the sacrifices he makes till the end for his ex-lover and her child".

== Soundtrack ==
The music was composed by M. S. Viswanathan and the lyrics were written by Kannadasan.

Track listing
No.	Title	Singer(s)	Length
1.	"Ammadi Ponnukku"	T. M. Soundararajan	3:40
2.	"Ammadi Ponnukku" (sad)	T. M. Soundararajan	2:49
3.	"Chera Chola Pandiyar"	L. R. Eswari, P. Madhuri	4:47
4.	"Chithirai Maadham"	P. Susheela	3:59
5.	"Nilavu Vanthu"	P. Susheela	4:22
Total length:			19:37

== Release and reception ==
Raman Ethanai Ramanadi was released on 15 August 1970. Shankar's Weekly wrote, "The basic ingredients of an average Tamil film are no less in number and variety than those of a Bombay film. If anything, there is an excess on the part of the Tamil film. [...] The story is absurd even by Madras standards. One cannot doubt the range of histrionics that Sivaji is capable of exhibiting, but it needs a tough director to get him to do what is wanted. Madhavan does not seem to be one. Hence some avoidable overacting by Sivaji." The film ran for over 100 days in theatres, and won the National Film Award for Best Feature Film in Tamil.

== Bibliography ==
- Chelliah, John Durai Asir (2020). Prabalangalum Prachanaigalum (in Tamil). Pustaka Digital Media.
- Dhananjayan, G. (2014). Pride of Tamil Cinema: 1931–2013. Blue Ocean Publishers. OCLC 898765509.
- Ganesan, Sivaji; Narayana Swamy, T. S. (2007) [2002]. Autobiography of an Actor: Sivaji Ganesan, October 1928 – July 2001. Sivaji Prabhu Charities Trust. OCLC 297212002.
