= Alangudi Somu =

Indian songwriter

- Born: 12 December 1932; Alangudi, Sivaganga district, Tamil Nadu
- Died: 6 June 1997 (aged 64)
- Occupations: lyricist, poet, producer

Alangudi Somu (12 December 1932 − 6 June 1997) was an Indian Tamil film lyricist who wrote many popular songs in several films. He was active in the field from 1960 till the late 1990s.

== About ==
Alangudi Somu born on 12 December 1932 in Alangudi village that come under the Sivaganga Lok Sabha constituency and located in Sivaganga district, Tamil Nadu. He was introduced to the Tamil film industry by his friend and poet Puratchidasan.

== Career ==
=== As a Lyricist ===
He started life as a lyricist with the song Ambalaikku Pombalai Avasiyandhaan for the film Yanai Paagan sung by A. L. Raghavan and L. R. Eswari.

Many of his songs were written in praise of Hindu Gods like Kanda Un Vasalile (sung by T. M. Soundararajan in Kongunattu Thangam), Avani Ellaam Pukazh Manakkum Amman Arul (Kaanchi Thalaivan), Arulvaaye Nee Arulvaaye (sung by Balamurali Krishna in Sadhu Mirandal) etc.

He wrote the song Iranthavanai Sumanthavanum Iranthittaan which is the only song sung by actor S. A. Ashokan in the film Iravum Pagalum. He wrote all the six songs for this film.

Andavan Ulagathin Mudhalaali is a song that became popular as it was picturised by M. G. Ramachandran in the film Thozhilali. This is the first M. G. R. film that Somu wrote lyrics for. Afterwards he wrote lyrics for many films that featured MGR.

His song Ponmagal Vandaal from the film Sorgam, portrayed in the film by Sivaji Ganesan was an all-time hit. This song was remixed by A. R. Rahman in Azhagiya Tamil Magan (2007). Likewise, his song Aadaludan Paadalai from the film Kudiyirundha Koyil (1968) was remixed by Amresh Ganesh in Motta Shiva Ketta Shiva (2017).

Alangudi Somu wrote about 170 songs in 80 films in a period spanning over 35 years since 1960.

=== As a producer ===
He produced two films. The first one Patham Pasali (1970) under the banner Alangudi Movies and the second film Varaverpu (1972) with his wife Sankari Somu as the producer under the banner Velavan Academy.

== Awards and Felicitations ==
He was felicitated by the Tamil Nadu Iyal Isai Nataka Mandram (literature, music and theatre), that is under the Government of Tamil Nadu, with the title Kalaimamani for the year 1973-74.

== Filmography ==
1960s

The list was compiled from Thiraikalanjiyam Part-1 and Thiraikalanjiyam Part-2.

1. Yanai Paagan (1960)
2. Kongunattu Thangam (1961)
3. Kaanchi Thalaivan (1963)
4. Kalai Arasi (1963)
5. Koduthu Vaithaval (1963)
6. Dheiva Thaai (1964)
7. Poompuhar (1964)
8. Thozhilali (1964)
9. Enga Veettu Pillai (1965)
10. Iravum Pagalum (1965)
11. Karthigai Deepam) (1965)
12. Naanal (1965)
13. Neerkumizhi (1965)
14. Oru Viral (1965)
15. Thazhampoo (1965)
16. Madras to Pondicherry (1966) - 1 song
17. Kathal Paduthum Padu (1966) - 1 song
18. Naan Aanaiyittal (1966)
19. Sadhu Mirandal (1966)
20. Selvam (1966)
21. Arasa Kattalai (1967)
22. Bhakta Prahlada (1967)
23. Kaavalkaaran (1967)
24. Bommalattam (1968)
25. Kanavan (1968)
26. Kannan En Kadhalan (1968)
27. Kudiyirundha Koyil(1968)
28. Adimaippenn (1969)

1970s

1. Penn Deivam (1970)
2. Sorgam (1970)
3. Kumari Kottam (1971) - 2 songs
4. Ponvandu (1973)
5. Thirumalai Deivam (1973)
6. 16 Vayathinile (1977)
7. Gnana Kuzhandhai (1979)

== Bibliography ==
- Sahadevan Vijayakumar. "Alangudi Somu (Poet, Lyricist, Film Producer)".
