= P. Madhavan =

Indian film director and producer

- Born: Palakrishnan Madhavan Naidu; 1 January 1928; Walajapet, Madras presidency, British India
- Died: 16 December 2003 (aged 75); Chennai, Tamil Nadu, India
- Education: B.A
- Occupations: Director producer
- Years active: 1963–1992

Palakrishnan Madhavan (1 January 1928 – 16 December 2003) was an Indian film director and producer in Tamil cinema in the 1960s and 1970s. Madhavan has directed 49 films and produced 39 films under the banner Arun Prasad Movies.

== Career ==
Madhavan, who came to Chennai to become an actor, started his career as an assistant to director T. R. Ragunath. He also worked as an associate director to C. V. Sridhar before becoming a full-fledged director making his debut with Mani Osai which failed at box-office. However, his second film Annai Illam became successful at box-office. His notable films include Dheiva Thaai, Vietnam Veedu, Thanga Pathakkam, Kanne Pappa, and Kuzhanthaikkaga. He was also the first chairman and managing director of the M.G.R Film City and the State Film Development Corporation. He has also served as a chairman of the National Film Awards.

== Awards ==
- 1970 – Raman Ethanai Ramanadi – National Film Award for Best Feature Film in Tamil
- 1972 – Pattikada Pattanama – National Film Award for Best Feature Film in Tamil
- 1970 – Nilave Nee Satchi – Tamil Nadu State Film Award for Best Director

== Filmography ==
Year	Film	Credited as		Language	Notes
Year	Film	Director	Producer	Language	Notes
1963	Mani Osai	✓		Tamil	
1963	Annai Illam	✓		Tamil	
1964	Dheiva Thaai	✓		Tamil	
1965	Neela Vanam	✓		Tamil	
1967	Penne Nee Vaazhga	✓	✓	Tamil	
1967	Muhurtha Naal	✓	✓	Tamil	
1968	Kuzhanthaikkaga	✓		Tamil	National Film Award for Best Child Artist by Baby Rani & National Film Award for Best Lyrics by Kannadasan
1968	Enga Oor Raja	✓	✓	Tamil	
1969	Kanne Pappa	✓		Tamil	
1970	Vietnam Veedu	✓		Tamil	Based on stage play of same name
1970	Raman Ethanai Ramanadi	✓	✓	Tamil	National Film Award for Best Feature Film in Tamil
1970	Nilave Nee Satchi	✓		Tamil	
1970	Aansoo Aur Muskan	✓		Hindi	Remake of Kanne Pappa
1971	Sabatham	✓		Tamil	
1971	Thenum Paalum	✓		Tamil	
1972	Pattikada Pattanama	✓	✓	Tamil	National Film Award for Best Feature Film in Tamil; Filmfare Award for Best Film – Tamil
1972	Dil Ka Raja	✓		Hindi	Remake of Tamil film Enga Thanga Raja
1972	Gnana Oli	✓		Tamil	Filmfare Award for Best Director – Tamil
1973	Ponnukku Thanga Manasu		✓	Tamil	
1973	Rajapart Rangadurai	✓		Tamil	
1974	Maanikka Thottil	✓		Tamil	
1974	Murugan Kattiya Vazhi	✓	✓	Tamil	
1974	Thanga Pathakkam	✓		Tamil	Based on stage play of same name
1975	Kasthuri Vijayam	✓		Tamil	
1975	Manithanum Deivamagalam	✓		Tamil	Remake of Telugu filmBuddhimanthudu
1975	Mannavan Vanthaanadi	✓		Tamil	
1975	Paattum Bharathamum	✓	✓	Tamil	25th Film
1976	Chitra Pournami	✓		Tamil	
1976	Paalooti Valartha Kili		✓	Tamil	
1977	Deviyin Thirumanam	✓		Tamil	
1978	En Kelvikku Enna Bathil	✓		Tamil	
1978	Shankar Salim Simon	✓		Tamil	Inspired from Amar Akbar Anthony
1979	Enippadigal	✓		Tamil	Remake of Telugu film Seetamalakshmi
1979	Veettukku Veedu Vasappadi	✓	✓	Tamil	Remake of Telugu film Intinti Ramayanam
1980	Kurivikoodu	✓		Tamil	
1980	Nan Nanedhan	✓		Tamil	
1981	Aadugal Nanaigindrana	✓		Tamil	
1982	Hitler Umanath	✓		Tamil	
1984	Sathyam Neeye	✓		Tamil	
1985	Karaiyai Thodadha Alaigal	✓	✓	Tamil	
1985	Ram Tere Kitne Nam	✓		Hindi	Remake of Raman Ethanai Ramanadi
1987	Chinna Kuyil Paaduthu	✓		Tamil	
1992	Agni Paarvai	✓		Tamil	

== Death ==
Madhavan died on 16 December 2003 at the age of 75 in Chennai.
