= P. N. Sundaram =

Indian cinematographer and director

- Born: 18 March 1934; Panangattiri, Malabar District, Madras Presidency
- Died: 22 March 2010 (aged 76); Chennai, Tamil Nadu, India
- Occupations: Cinematographer, Film Director
- Years active: 1940s-2010
- Spouse(s): Parvathy Sundaram Children = Sharada, Lalitha, Mahadevan, Gayatri
- Awards: Tamil Nadu State Film Award for Best Cinematographer

P. N. Sundaram (18 March 1934 – 22 March 2010) was an Indian cinematographer and director who worked in over 250 films in Tamil, Telugu, Kannada, Malayalam and Hindi film industries. Hailing from a lower-middle-class family, he struggled with poverty in his early years and started working early in life. He started his career as a camera assistant at Vijaya Vauhini Studios in the 1950s and later assisted A. Vincent in cinematography. He was one of the founding members of Film Employees Federation of South India and served as the president of the South Indian Cinematographers Association. Sundaram also directed a few films, including seven in Malayalam. Kolilakkam is one of his best known films in Malayalam. Jayan, who was the lead actor in the film, died in a helicopter accident during the shooting of its climax.

Sundaram won the Tamil Nadu State Film Award for Best Cinematographer for his work in the 1968 film Uyarndha Manidhan, and many other accolades, including awards from Jayalalithaa, actor and former chief minister of Tamil Nadu.

Some of his most notable works include Uyarndha Manithan, Thanga Pathakkam, Vietnam Veedu, among many others. He has also worked with veteran actors and directors like Jayan, M. G. Ramachandran, Sivaji Ganesan, Sridevi, P. Madhavan and Kamal Haasan.

== Selected filmography ==
- Anbe Vaa (1966)
- Naan Aanaiyittal (1966)
- Uyarndha Manithan (1968)
- Puthiya Bhoomi (1968)
- Vietnam Veedu (1970)
- Sabatham (1971)
- Thanga Pathakkam (1974)
- Ayodhya (1975 film)
- Aayiram Janmangal (1976)
- Aparadhi (1977 film)
- Kolilakkam (1981)
- Kakka (1982)
- Prathijnja (1983)
