= Vivekananda Pictures =

Indian film company

- Founded: 1977
- Headquarters: Chennai, Tamil Nadu, India
- Key people: Tiruppur Mani; Tiruppur Vivek
- Products: Film Production; Film Distribution

Vivekananda Pictures is an Indian film production and distribution company, based at Chennai, India. The production company was established in 1977 by its founder, Tiruppur Mani. He produced around thirty movies under his banner. After a hiatus it produced the blockbuster movie Kaithi under Tiruppur Vivek who is now at the heilm of the Company All their films had Sivakumar and Sathyaraj as lead actor.

== History ==
The production house first feature film Kannan Ori Kaikuzhandai (1978) was directed by Venkatesh, in which Sivakumar and Sumithra played the lead roles. Following this film, Sivakumar has been their choice for the lead actor for Rosappu Ravikkaikaari, Vandichakkaram, Aaniver, Aayiram Muthangal. Though first five films has got Sivakumar as male lead, the female leads were Sumithra for Kannan Ori Kaikuzhandai, Deepa for Rosappu Ravikkaikaari, Saritha for Vandichakkaram and Aaniver, Radha for Aayiram Muthangal. Late actor Vinu Chakravarthy was introduced as story and screenplay writer in Vandichakkaram and it was directed by K. Vijayan. It is the debut movie for Silk Smitha in Tamil. Vandichakkaram won third prize at Tamil Nadu state award for best film for the year 1980. Vinu Chakravarthy was introduced as actor in Rosappu Ravikkaikaari and comedian Loose Mohan rose to fame through the same movie. In 1983, the company produced Imagial starring Sivaji Ganesan, Saritha, Sarath babu and others, music was composed by Gangai amaran. Their next was Eetti starred by Vijayakanth, Vishnuvardhan, Nalini, Viji and directed by Rajasekhar. Vidinja Kalyanam was their next which had Sathyaraj, Jayashree, Sujatha in lead roles and was directed by Manivannan. In 1988, they remade Mohanlal and Karthika starrer Malayalam movie Gandhinagar 2nd Street as Anna Nagar Mudhal Theru. Sathyaraj and Radha did the lead roles in this movie.

In the late 1990s, Mani planned a film titled Kadhal Sugamanathu starring his son Vivekanand in the lead role. However, the project eventually did not materialise. After a hiatus of two decades, the production company made its comeback by co-producing and distributing Kaithi (2019).

== Filmography ==
Year	Title	Cast	Director	Music director	Release Status	Mentions
1978	Kannan Oru Kai Kuzhandhai	Sivakumar, Sumithra	Venkatesh	Illayaraja	August 1978	
1979	Rosappo Ravikaikaari	Sivakumar, Deepa	Devaraj Mohan	Illayaraja	August 1979	
1980	Vandichakkaram	Sivakumar, Saritha, Silk Smitha	K. Vijayan	Shankar–Ganesh	August 1980	Tamil Nadu State Film Award for Best Film; Filmfare Award for Best Actor; Filmfare Award for Best Actress
1981	Aaniver	Sivakumar, Saritha	K. Vijayan	Shankar–Ganesh	August 1981	
1982	Aayiram Muthangal	Sivakumar, Radha	Annakili S. Devarajan	Shankar–Ganesh	March 1982	
1983	Imaigal	Sivaji Ganesan, Saritha	R. Krishnamurthy	Gangaiamaran	April 1983	
1985	Eetti	Vijayakanth, Nalini, Viji	Rajasekhar	Illayaraja	August 1985	
1986	Vidinja Kalyanam	Sathyaraj, Jayashree, Sujatha	Manivannan	Illayaraja	October 1986	
1986	Kalamellam Un Madiyil	Murali, Jayashree	Rajasekar	Illayaraja	1986	
1987	Chinna Thambi Periya Thambi	Sathyaraj, Prabhu, Nadhiya	Manivannan	Gangaiamaran	February 1987	
1988	Anna Nagar Mudhal Theru	Sathyaraj, Prabhu, Nadhiya, Ambika	Balu Anand	Chandrabose	January 1988	
1990	Vazhkkai Chakkaram	Sathyaraj, Gowthami	Manivannan	Shankar–Ganesh	February 1990	
1990	Vazhndhu Kattuvom	Ramki, Gowthami, K. R. Vijaya	R. Krishnamurthy	Shankar–Ganesh	December 1990	
1992	Unakkaga Pirenthen	Prashanth, Mohini	Balu Anand	Deva	May 1992	
1994	Vandicholai Chinnarasu	Sathyaraj, Suganya	Manoj Kumar	A. R. Rahman	April 1994	
2019	Kaithi	Karthi, Narain	Lokesh Kanagaraj	Sam C. S.	October 2019	
