= S. V. Subbaiah =

Indian actor

- S. V. Subbaiah in Roshakari (1974)
- Born: Sengottai Vellaiyan Aasari. Subbaiah; 1920; Sengottai, Tirunelveli district, Tamil Nadu, India
- Died: 29 January 1980 (aged 59–60); Red Hills, Chennai
- Occupation: Film Artiste
- Known for: Character Roles
- Children: 5 daughters 1 son

Sengottai Vellaiyan Subbaiah (1920–1980) was an Indian actor who featured mainly in Tamil-language plays and films. He featured mostly in character roles that communicated emotional feelings.

== Early life ==
Subbaiah hailed from Sengottai in Tirunelveli district of Tamil Nadu, India. Spurning academic pursuits, he joined a drama troupe called ‘Senkottai Ananda Sakthivel Paramananda Boys Company’ when he was 11 years old. Later, he was part of drama troupes such as Balashanmukhananda Sabha and Sakthi Nataka Sabha. Subbaiah's performance as Kavi Anandar in S. D. Sundharam's play Kaviyin Kanavu staged by Sakthi Nataka Sabha in 1945 fetched rave reviews. This paved the way for him to enter Tamil films.

== Film career ==
His first film was Vijayalakshmi (1946) produced by Pragathi Pictures, the forerunner of AVM Productions. Next he featured in Kanjan (1947) produced by Jupiter Pictures and directed by Kovai Ayyamuthu and T. R. Gopu. Then, he featured as Sakuni in Abhimanyu in which M. G. Ramachandran donned the role of Arjuna.

Subbaiah's breakthrough came with the film Kaalam Maari Pochu (1956) in which he featured in a character role. This set the tone for his type of role in future films. Though there are many films that his role remains ever-green among Tamil film lovers, the role he played in the historical film Kappalottiya Thamizhan (1961) will lie deep down in their minds. He featured as Subramania Bharati in this film. His style as Bharati was followed by many artistes, right from Sivaji Ganesan to Kamal Haasan, in the role of Bharati, in future films.

Subbaiah produced a film Kaaval Dheivam under his own banner Ambal Productions. The film featured big-time stars like Sivaji Ganesan, R. Muthuraman, T. S. Balaiah, M. N. Nambiar, Nagesh and V. K. Ramasamy in well defined roles. Most of them appeared as guest artistes.

Sivakumar and Lakshmi starred in this film. Sivaji Ganesan refused to receive any payment for his role. A sentimental Subbaiah said "In my next birth I will become a dog and serve Sivaji Ganesan". Such was his humble persona.

== Personal life ==
S. V. Subbaiah was born into a Viswakarma family. He was interested in agriculture. He bought lands in Karanodai near Sengundram (Red Hills) and developed it into a farm. When he was not occupied with film shooting, he worked on his farm. He was deeply religious and lived his life with certain principles, such as not working after 9 p.m. He was a voracious reader and a fan of Jayakanthan.

He died on 29 January 1980 due to ill health. It was a strange coincidence that the man born at Sengottai, which means Red Fort, died at his farm in Sengundram which means Red Hills.

== Filmography ==
Year	Film	Role	Notes
1946	Vijayalakshmi		Debut film
1947	Ekambavanan		
1947	Kanjan	Kandasamy (Miser)	Main Character
1948	Abhimanyu	Sakuni	
1948	Mariamman		
1948	Thirumalisai Alvar		
1949	Mayavathi	Kaamaruban	
1950	Unmayin Vetri		
1952	Rani		
1952	Velaikaran		
1954	Pudhu Yugam	Murugan	
1954	Sugam Enge	Boopathy, The Postman	
1955	Mangaiyar Thilakam	Karunakaran	
1955	Porter Kandan		
1955	Valliyin Selvan	Servant	
1956	Kaalam Maari Pochu	Poor Farmer	
1956	Naane Raja		
1956	Rambaiyin Kaadhal	King	
1957	Manaalane Mangaiyin Baakkiyam	King Deva Rayar	
1957	Soubhagyavathi	Hero's Father	
1958	Vanjikottai Valiban	Murugan	
1959	Bhaaga Pirivinai	Sundaralingam	
1959	Koodi Vazhnthal Kodi Nanmai		
1959	Naan Sollum Ragasiyam	Velayutham	
1959	Ponnu Vilaiyum Boomi		
1959	Vaazha Vaitha Deivam		
1960	Irumbu Thirai	Saravanan	
1960	Kalathur Kannamma	Murugan	
1960	Parthiban Kanavu	Ponnan (Boatman)	
1961	Kappalottiya Thamizhan	Subramania Bharati	
1961	Malliyam Mangalam		
1961	Paava Mannippu	James	
1961	Palum Pazhamum		
1962	Vadivukku Valai Kappu		
1962	Paadha Kaanikkai		
1963	Naanum Oru Penn	Kali	
1963	Panathottam		
1963	Yarukku Sontham		
1964	Kalai Kovil	Gifted Musician	Lead role
1965	Kaakum Karangal	Ranganathan	
1965	Thaayum Magalum	Subrahmaniyam	
1966	Ramu	Mad Tamil teacher	
1966	Thaali Bhagyam	Nallasivam	
1968	Jeevanaamsam	(Hero) Murthi's uncle	
1969	Kaaval Dheivam		His own Production
1969	Kula Vilakku		
1970	Paadhukaappu		Guest appearance
1971	Aathi Parasakthi	Abirami Pattar	
1971	Irulum Oliyum		
1971	Moondru Dheivangal	Pasupathy	
1972	Needhi	Velu	
1973	Arangetram	Ramu Sastrigal	
1973	Nathaiyil Muthu		
1973	Manipayal	Kanthan, a cobbler	
1973	Ponnunjal		
1973	Pookari		
1973	Sollathaan Ninaikkiren		
1974	Roshakkari		
1975	Idhayakkani	Ponnusamy (Estate Supervisor)	
1976	Unakkaga Naan		
1976	Sathyam		
1976	Annakili		
1977	Dheepam	Ramaiya	
1977	Kavikkuyil	Ramaiah pillai	
1978	Athaivida Ragasiyam		
1978	Maariyamman Thiruvizha	Heroine's father	
1978	Vanakkatukuriya Kathaliye		
1979	Gnana Kuzhandhai	Vaakeesar or Thirunavukarasar	
1979	Sigappukkal Mookkuthi		Last film
1991	Nallathai Naadu Kekum	Police Inspector Sathiyakeerthi (Archive Footage)	Posthumous release. Archive footage of MGR's unfinished film of the same name used.

== Bibliography ==
- S. V. Subbaiah (in Tamil) (in Tamil)
