= Theerpugal Thiruththapadalam =

- Title card
- Directed by: M. Bhaskar
- Written by: M. Bhaskar
- Produced by: M. Bhaskar
- Starring: Sivakumar; Ambika
- Cinematography: Viswam Natrajan
- Edited by: M. Vellaisamy
- Music by: Shankar–Ganesh
- Production company: Oscar Movies
- Distributed by: Oscar Movies
- Release date: 9 October 1982
- Country: India
- Language: Tamil

Theerpugal Thiruththapadalam (transl. Judgments can be amended) is a 1982 Indian Tamil-language mystery film produced, directed and written by M. Bhaskar. The film stars Sivakumar, Ambika and Sathyakala. It was released on 9 October 1982, and became a silver jubilee hit.

== Plot ==
Rajesh is a legal advisor of a company. His wife Radha is possessive and argues with her husband. She suspects her husband is having affair with his staff. Radha has a habit, whereby she sleeps off after her anger or argues with Rajesh. Rajesh further consults with his doctor, that Radha could be possessive towards Rajesh and request him to visit the clinic the day after. Rajesh returns home, and found, Radha was sleeping. He is shocked to find a man named Lawrence a businessman dead in his house. Rajesh disposes of the body by pushing off in Lawrence's car from a cliff.

Rajesh returns home. He inquires generally about any visitor who came by to their house. However, Radha cannot remember things happen after she woke up. Rajesh learns from a newspaper that police suspect foul play in Lawrence's death. He visits Lawrence's shop and learns from salesman Kamal that Lawrence is a womaniser. Kamal further tells Rajesh that Lawrence's wife often visits Lawrence's office and argues with him. Rajesh admits Radha to a sanatorium regarding Radha's health issues.

The police begin their investigation. They suspect Sheila. However, due to guilt feeling, Rajesh rescues Sheila by giving false witnesses and saves her. After few days, the moneylender asks for payment to her deceased husband Lawrence's huge debts. She informs Rajesh that both Radha and Lawrence are having affair. Rajesh at first, does not believe the affair. Sheila blackmails emotionally Rajesh. Rajesh borrows money from his father in law and gives to Sheila so as not to reveal this matter. Police secretly observing Rajesh and Sheila. The rest of the plot has some events leading to suspicious and revealing the mystery at the end.

== Cast ==
- Sivakumar as Rajesh
- Ambika as Radha
- Sathyakala as Sheila
- Meena as Priya
- Y. G. Mahendran as Kamal
- Vanitha as Kamini
- Vennira Aadai Moorthy as Kamini's father
- Sathyaraj as Lawrence
- V. Gopalakrishnan as the Inspector

== Soundtrack ==
The soundtrack was composed by Shankar–Ganesh.

Track listing
No.	Title	Lyrics	Singer(s)	Length
1.	"Raagam Thaalam Pallavi"	Kuruvikarambai Shanmugam	S. P. Balasubrahmanyam, Vani Jairam
2.	"Oru Ooril"	Pulamaipithan	P. Jayachandran

== Release and reception ==
Because of the failure of a previous Bhaskar film Soolam, distributors were reluctant to buy the film, prompting Bhaskar to release it himself all over Tamil Nadu. However it received positive response, and distributors bought the film from Bhaskar for the price he quoted. Thiraignani of Kalki praised the acting of Sivakumar and Ambika, humour of Y. G. Mahendran and concluded saying after so many days, a film which does not bore. There is no amendment to the judgment.
