= Chittu Kuruvi =

1978 Indian Tamil-language film

- Directed by: Devaraj–Mohan
- Screenplay by: Vaali
- Story by: R. Selvaraj
- Produced by: V. Kandhasamy; Devaraj–Mohan
- Starring: Sivakumar; Sumithra; Meera
- Cinematography: R. N. K. Prasad
- Edited by: M. Vellaisamy
- Music by: Ilaiyaraaja
- Production company: Sree Vishnupriya Creations
- Release date: 9 June 1978
- Country: India
- Language: Tamil

Chittu Kuruvi (transl. Sparrow) is a 1978 Indian Tamil-language crime film starring Sivakumar, Sumithra, and Meera in the lead roles. The film was directed by Devaraj–Mohan and released on 9 June 1978.

== Plot ==
Raja leads a dacoity‑and‑smuggling gang that the police are pursuing. After killing an approver, Moorthy, Raja orders his men to go into hiding. Hoping to stay out of police sight, while boarding a bus to his native village, Thalapathikottai, he accidentally leaves Moorthy's Hotel Samrat room key behind. Ganesh, a look‑alike doppelgänger of Raja, is in Madras looking for work. Struggling with poverty, Ganesh frequently borrows from neighbours, and one of his acquaintances is a police Inspector. The inspector's sister, Uma, is attracted to Ganesh, though he remains oblivious. Ganesh happens to be at the bus station and, noticing the hotel name and room number, he returns the room key to the hotel reception the next morning. Suspecting the individual who returned the key might be the murderer, the inspector asks the receptionist to identify the person who returned it. As Ganesh has returned the key, he realises that he has been framed for Moorthy's murder.

In Thalapathikottai, Raja reunites with his childhood sweetheart Chittu, a coracle driver. His grandparents are overjoyed that he has returned after fifteen years. Raja spends his money renovating their modest hut into a lavish house, drawing curious looks from the villagers. He fears his true identity as a dacoit might be exposed to his grandparents or Chittu. Chittu's affection for Raja deepens into love, but her brother Sadaiyan refuses to accept her feelings for a wealthy outsider. Soon, Raja receives a newspaper clipping about the murder he committed and notices two mysterious, disguised individuals in the village. Chittu dreams of saving enough money to lease the mango farm so that they can earn a higher income. Using her savings of ₹1,000 (equivalent to ₹30,000 or US$310 in 2026), she and Sadaiyan enter the auction.

Mayilthogai also bids, having previously taken control of the farm by luring wealthy landlords. Now she brings a fake landlord, Paneerselvam, hoping to regain the farm. Paneerselvam, unable to admit he has no money, drives up the auction price to ₹2,000 (equivalent to ₹60,000 or US$620 in 2026), but Raja secures the lease for Chittu. The villagers begin to gossip about their relationship, and Chittu is also shocked seeing Raja spend the money on her. Chittu tells Raja that the gossip stems from his lavish spending and asks him to use his wealth for the village's benefit, so that he will earn goodwill and improve their chances of marriage. Motivated, Raja seeks the panchayat's permission to renovate the temple and build a school; the panchayat agrees, and development work begins, gradually restoring his reputation. Meanwhile, Ganesh finds work as a salesman and eventually reciprocates Uma's love. Uma's family arranges their marriage, but during the ceremony, a member of Raja's gang mistakes Ganesh for Raja and storms the hall, only to be apprehended by Uma's brother and leading to Ganesh's arrest on murder charges. The inspector insists that all evidence points to Ganesh's guilt and that he will be sentenced for the murder.

Mayilthogai, unaware that her lottery ticket had won ₹100,000 (equivalent to ₹3.0 million or US$31,000 in 2026), drops it into the offering box that was being used for temple renovation, which is in the care of Raja's grandfather, Ammasai. To retrieve the ticket, she instructs her sidekick, Panchavarnam, to make a replica of the offering box, put ₹125 (equivalent to ₹3,700 or US$39 in 2026) of her own money into it, and plan to swap the original box containing the ticket. While Mayilthogai is away, Panchavarnam exchanges the offering boxes, but Mayilthogai, unaware of the switch, replaces the offering box again. As a result, the box she intended to steal remains with Ammasai. While opening the offering box, Panchavarnam behaves as if he is possessed by God and convinces the villagers to return Mayilthogai's lottery ticket to her. Believing the ruse, the villagers hand the ticket back. As fees, Panchavarnam demands a ransom of ₹1,001 (equivalent to ₹30,000 or US$310 in 2026), but he soon discovers that the ticket was worthless because the prize had been awarded to the next serial number. To escape Mayilthogai's anger, he donates the ₹1,001 (equivalent to ₹30,000 or US$310 in 2026) to the temple fund, leaving her helpless.

As before, when a newspaper clipping was sent, a photograph of Moorthy was delivered to Raja, keeping him constantly terrorised. Meanwhile, Raja's grandparents arrange for Raja to marry Chittu, and Sadaiyan now accepts their union. Sensing a threat to his life, Raja decides to postpone the marriage until he can safely disclose everything. Paneerselvam reveals to Raja that he, too, is a thief and that he was the one who sent the photograph and the newspaper article to blackmail him. He demands that Raja retrieve his ancestral property document from Paneerselvam's family lawyer—a man who had forged a false deed and is now claiming the property that rightfully belongs to Paneerselvam. Though reluctant initially, Raja, under the pretence of fetching a statue from Mahabalipuram, travels to Madras. He sneaks into the lawyer's house in Adyar, evades a guard dog and the security staff, and manages to seize the genuine document.

Severely injured, he stumbles into Uma's house. Mistaking him for her husband Ganesh, Uma tends to Raja's wounds and urges him to flee so he can avoid a death sentence. The next morning, Uma is shocked to learn that Ganesh is still in prison. She tells her brother that a lookalike of Ganesh had visited her the night before. Her brother discovers a locket containing a photograph of the stranger, and by enlarging the picture, they identify a name on a dam and begin tracing Raja to his village. Raja meets Paneerselvam and hands over the demanded document; Paneerselvam thanks him and promises to stop the blackmail. With the temple renovation completed as Raja pledged to, the consecration ceremony arrives.

The police, led by the Inspector, storm the temple to arrest Raja. The villagers try to intervene, and Raja is pressed to either admit or deny the accusations against him. He confesses to the murder of Moorthy, shocking the entire village. Overwhelmed, Chittu collapses and dies on the spot. The film concludes with Raja weeping over Chittu's lifeless body as the police handcuff him and lead him away.

== Cast ==
- Sivakumar in a dual role as Raja and Ganesh
- Sumithra as Chittu
- Srikanth as Paneerselvam
- Manorama as Mayilthogai
- Pushpalatha as Sumathi, Uma's sister-in-law
- S. N. Lakshmi as Raja's grandmother
- Meera as Uma, Ganesh' wife
- Suruli Rajan as Panchavarnam, Mayilthogai's sidekick
- Vennira Aadai Moorthy as Ammasai, Raja's grandfather
- Senthamarai as Sadaiyan, Chittu's brother
- A. R. Srinivasan as an Inspector, Uma's brother
- Vairam Krishnamoorthy as a village chief
- K. K. Soundar as a villager (uncredited role)

== Production ==
Chittu Kuruvi was directed by Devaraj–Mohan and was also produced by them under Vishnupriya Creations. The cinematography was handled by R. N. K. Prasad. The dialogues were written by lyricist Vaali. The film was launched on 17 November 1977 with Devaraj–Mohan's mentor director P. Madhavan and cinematographer P. N. Sundaram starting the shoot. Majority of the film was shot in and around the villages near Mysore such as Talakadu and Malangi and was completed within 20 days. The voice for Meena was dubbed by voice artist Hemamalini.

== Soundtrack ==
The music was composed by Ilaiyaraaja and lyrics written by Vaali. The songs "En Kanmani", "Unna Nambi" and "Adada Maamara" became hugely popular. The song "En Kanmani" was one of the earliest Indian songs to be composed in Counterpoint.

Track listing
No.	Title	Singer(s)	Length
1.	"Adada Maamara Kiliye"	S. Janaki	05:18
2.	"En Kanmani"	S. P. Balasubrahmanyam, P. Susheela	04:16
3.	"Ponnula Ponnula"	S. P. Balasubrahmanyam	04:11
4.	"Unna Nambi Nethiyile"	P. Susheela	03:55
5.	"Adada Maamara Kiliye (Bit)"	S. Janaki	00.19
Total length:			22:04
