= Pournami Alaigal =

- Theatrical release poster
- Directed by: M. Bhaskar
- Written by: M. Bhaskar
- Produced by: M. Bhaskar
- Starring: Sivakumar; Ambika; Revathi
- Cinematography: Viswam Nataraj
- Edited by: M. Vellaichami
- Music by: Shankar–Ganesh
- Production company: Oscar Movies
- Release date: 12 January 1985
- Country: India
- Language: Tamil

Pournami Alaigal (transl. Full moon waves) is a 1985 Indian Tamil-language legal thriller film produced, written and directed by M. Bhaskar. The film stars Sivakumar, Ambika and Revathi, with Major Sundarrajan, Sivachandran and A. R. S. in supporting roles. It was released on 12 January 1985 and emerged a commercial success. The film was remade into Telugu as Sravana Sandhya (1986) and in Hindi as Majaal (1987).

== Plot ==
Rajesh, his wife Radha, and her father Ethiraj are advocates. Rajesh lives in Ethiraj's house but feels neglected by Radha, a government prosecutor, and Ethiraj, the seniormost celebrated lawyer, while he merely prepares case documents for them. Because of their fame, Rajesh remains unrecognized by the public, but he hides his hurt from Ethiraj, his former mentor. Psychiatrist Dr. Saradha comforts him and offers to speak to Radha and Ethiraj about the situation. During the 25th wedding anniversary celebration of Ethiraj's rich businessman friend, Gnanaraj and Mythili, Rajesh is humiliated. He confronts Radha, who retorts that he is a failed lawyer and married her for money.

Determined to prove himself, Rajesh approaches Gnanaraj for a case, hoping Ethiraj's influence might help, but Gnanaraj rebuffs him. On Independence Day event at an orphanage, Deepa—who had just arrived in Chennai from Trichy—shoots and kills Gnanaraj with her husband, Sub-inspector Lawrence's revolver, and surrenders to Inspector Mahendra. Church Father Michael approaches Ethiraj for legal help, even though Gnanaraj was Ethiraj's friend, but he refuses. Because most lawyers consider Gnanaraj untouchable, Rajesh sees a chance to prove himself and agrees to defend Deepa. Ethiraj and Radha warn him not to take the case, leading to an argument, making Rajesh leave Ethiraj's house.

Rajesh then moves to the church with Michael, who reveals Deepa’s known past: after her mother Mary's suicide, Deepa had written angrily on Mary's grave that she would kill Gnanaraj. Suspecting Gnanaraj's involvement in Mary's death, Michael protected Deepa when Gnanaraj's trusted driver Sebastian tried to adopt her, and sent Deepa to her maternal aunt in Trichy. Dr. Saradha diagnoses Deepa and discovers that Deepa married Lawrence four years ago, but deliberately kept him at a distance because her sole purpose was to kill Gnanaraj. Rajesh takes up the defense, initially claiming Deepa has childhood‑onset OCD. He stammers during his first court argument, while Radha, with witnesses and evidence, proves Deepa committed the murder.

Lawrence testifies against Deepa, stating she had been planning a killing and also behaved violently during intimacy, and so announces their divorce. Rajesh counters by arguing that Deepa has traumatic psychosis that can cause mental instability. Deepa pleads with Lawrence, but he remains firm and leaves for Trichy. Rajesh, trying to protect Deepa's health, lies that Lawrence has changed his mind about the divorce. Radha, misunderstanding the situation, suspects Rajesh of having an affair with Deepa. In the second hearing, Rajesh presents Lucy, the orphanage caretaker, who reveals that Gnanaraj impregnated her and that his wife, Mythili, funds the illegitimate child to keep the scandal hidden. Rajesh also forces Mahendra to admit that Gnanaraj was involved in Mary's murder, a case earlier ruled a suicide. Father Michael testifies that Deepa was the sole eyewitness to Mary's killing.

Deepa learns Rajesh had lied about Lawrence not divorcing her. She now accepts that Lawrence may divorce and remarriage. Meanwhile, Radha begins to respect Rajesh and asks him to return home, but he refuses, citing past humiliation. In the final hearing, Rajesh questions Sebastian, who discloses what happened the day Mary died: Gnanaraj broke into Mary’s house, raped and killed her with a cross in front of 10‑year‑old Deepa. This trauma left Deepa unable to have normal intimacy with Lawrence. Using Dr. Saradha's testimony, Rajesh proves that Deepa was in a psychotic state when she killed Gnanaraj. Finally, Deepa is acquitted, making Rajesh's first case a success—especially against his wife, Radha.

Seeing Rajesh's brilliance, Ethiraj has a change of heart and invites him back as his son‑in‑law, but Rajesh declines. He files for divorce from Radha, intending to marry Deepa. Ethiraj, furious, confronts Rajesh and threatens to kill Deepa. Meanwhile, moved by Rajesh's care and determined not to fall in love, Deepa chooses to become a nun, shocking everyone. In her final wish, she asks Rajesh to reconcile with Radha, then departs to serve Jesus forever.

== Cast ==
- Sivakumar as Rajesh
- Ambika as Radha
- Revathi as Deepa Lawrence
- Sumitra as Dr. Saratha
- Prameela as Mythili Gnanaraj
- Major Sundarrajan as Ethiraj
- V. Gopalakrishnan as Inspector Mahendra
- Sivachandran as Gnanaraj
- Nizhalgal Ravi as Sub-inspector Lawrence
- A. R. S. as Church Father Michael
- Baby Meena as young Deepa
- Senthil as Pavadasamy
- Oru Viral Krishna Rao
- Pasi Narayanan as a cloth store salesman
- Narasimhan as Gnanaraja's secretary
- Nagaraja Cholan as Sebastian, Gnanaraja's driver
- Pon. Paramaguru in a special appearance as a judge

== Production ==
Pournami Alaigal was produced, written and directed by M. Bhaskar under Oscar Movies. Cinematography was handled by Viswam Nataraj, and editing by M. Vellaichami. The court scenes were shot on a set created at Vijaya Vauhini Studios. A dialogue written by Bhaskar, "Aalamarathukku keezhe edhuvum varaladhu" (Nothing grows under a banyan tree) is a South Indian proverb. Three songs were picturised at Ooty while some scenes were filmed at Chennai at places such as charity home at Kilpauk.

== Soundtrack ==
The music is composed by Shankar–Ganesh. The song "Thein Paayum" was originally written for Thandikkappatta Nyayangal (1983).

Track listing
No.	Title	Lyrics	Singer(s)	Length
1.	"Saranam Saranam Thalaiva"	Pulamaipithan	S. P. Balasubrahmanyam, S. Janaki	4:19
2.	"Thein Paayum"	Muthulingam	Vani Jairam, P. Jayachandran	4:39
3.	"Nizhal Thedi"	Pulamaipithan	S. Janaki, K. J. Yesudas	5:09
Total length:				14:07

== Release and reception ==
Pournami Alaigal was released on 12 January 1985. The film was a commercial success, running for over 100 days in theatres. Jayamanmadhan of Kalki wrote it is the waxing moon, the full moon needs a little more thought and concluded that director should show his talent in the next picture. Balumani of Anna praised the acting, cinematography, music and direction.
