= Thunai Iruppal Meenakshi =

- Theatrical release poster
- Directed by: Valampuri Somanathan
- Screenplay by: Valampuri Somanathan
- Based on: Samsaram (1951) by Gemini Studios
- Produced by: K. N. Subbaiah
- Starring: Sivakumar; Vijayakumar; Sujatha
- Cinematography: M. Masthan
- Edited by: M. Babu
- Music by: Ilaiyaraaja
- Production company: S. P. V. Films
- Release date: 5 August 1977
- Country: India
- Language: Tamil

Thunai Iruppal Meenakshi (transl. Meenakshi will protect) is a 1977 Indian Tamil-language drama film written and directed by Valampuri Somanathan. It is based on the 1951 Tamil film Samsaram. The film stars Sivakumar, Vijayakumar and Sujatha. It was released on 5 August 1977, and became a major success.

== Cast ==
- Sivakumar
- Vijayakumar
- Sujatha
- Suvarna
- C. K. Saraswathi
- Vijaya Chandrika
- Moulee
- K. A. Thangavelu
- Thengai Srinivasan
- A. Karunanidhi
- S. V. Ramadas
- Manorama

== Production ==
Thunai Iruppal Meenakshi is based on the 1951 Tamil film Samsaram produced by Gemini Studios, who are credited for the remake's story. The film saw Sivakumar and Sujatha pairing for the second time after Annakili (1976). A scene involving them was shot at AVM Studios.

== Soundtrack ==
The music was composed by Ilaiyaraaja, with lyrics by Panchu Arunachalam. The song "Sugamo Aayiram" is set to the Carnatic raga Kapi.

Track listing
No.	Title	Singer(s)	Length
1.	"Vaarthai Illamal"	P. Susheela
2.	"Sugamo Aayiram"	P. Susheela
3.	"Unmaikke Vazhthirunthen"	Malaysia Vasudevan, Kovai Soundarrajan, Poornima
4.	"Sethiloru Sengazhani"	T. M. Soundararajan, S. Janaki
5.	"Ammamma Pasikuthe"	Sasirekha, P. Niraja

== Release ==
Thunai Iruppal Meenakshi was released on 5 August 1977, and became a major success.
