= Isai Paadum Thendral =

- Title card
- Directed by: S. Devaraj
- Screenplay by: A. L. Narayanan
- Story by: Bhadran
- Produced by: Rani Chakrapani
- Starring: Sivakumar; Ambika; Jayarekha
- Cinematography: A. Somasundaram
- Edited by: B. Kandhasamy
- Music by: Ilaiyaraaja
- Production company: N.C.Creations
- Release date: 12 June 1986
- Country: India
- Language: Tamil

Isai Paadum Thendral (transl. The Musical Breeze) is a 1986 Indian Tamil-language film directed by S. Devaraj. The film stars Sivakumar, Ambika and Jayarekha. It is a remake of the 1982 Malayalam film Ente Mohangal Poovaninju. The film was released on 12 June 1986.

== Plot ==
Mohan's father wants him to marry Menaka (Jayarekha) but Mohan (Sivakumar) likes Kalyani (Ambika). His father gives in to his demands but Menaka has other plans. On the marriage day, Menaka plots and murders Kalyani by putting poison in her milk which leaves Mohan depressed. After being coerced by his father, Mohan finally agrees to marry Menaka. During the first night, Mohan kills himself by mixing poison with the milk and reveals to Menaka that he knows that she killed Kalyani and he desperately killed himself so that she will lead the rest of her life in sadness. The film ends with Mohan breathing his last with the memories of Kalyani.

== Cast ==
- Sivakumar as Mohan
- Ambika as Kalyani
- Jayarekha as Menaka
- K. P. Ummer
- Janagaraj as a violin student
- Goundamani
- Nizhalgal Ravi
- J. V. Ramana Murthi
- Nalini (Guest appearance)

== Production ==
The film was launched at Prasad Studios with the song recording of "Isai Paadu Nee".

== Soundtrack ==
The soundtrack was composed by Ilaiyaraaja. The song "Isai Paadu Nee" is set to the Hindustani raga Jog. The Tyagaraja composition "Raghuvara Ninnu" also features in the film.

Track listing
No.	Title	Lyrics	Singer(s)	Length
1.	"Endhan Kaikuttaiyai"	Vairamuthu	K. J. Yesudas, S. Janaki
2.	"Isai Paadu Nee"	Vaali	S. Janaki
3.	"Raghuvara Ninnu"	Tyagaraja	M. Balamuralikrishna, K. J. Yesudas, S. Janaki
4.	"Disco King"	Gangai Amaran	K. J. Yesudas, Vani Jairam
5.	"Vaazhaimaram Katti"	Mu. Metha	K. J. Yesudas, S. Janaki
6.	"Manasuloni"	Tyagaraja	K. J. Yesudas, S. Janaki
