= Chakravarthy (1995 film) =

- Film poster
- Directed by: M. Bhaskar
- Written by: M. Bhaskar
- Produced by: M. Bhaskar
- Starring: Karthik; Bhanupriya
- Cinematography: Viswam Natraj
- Edited by: Krishnamoorthy-Siva
- Music by: Deva
- Production company: Oscar Movies
- Release date: 29 July 1995
- Running time: 130 minutes
- Country: India
- Language: Tamil

Chakravarthy is a 1995 Indian Tamil-language crime film directed by M. Bhaskar. The film stars Karthik and Bhanupriya. It was censored in 1992, but released only in 1995.

== Plot ==
Chakravarthy, a new CID officer, lives in Bhanu's rental house. Bhanu hates the police department, so Chakravarthy lies about his job. His superior reveals that Bhanu killed her half-brother Boopathy. Chakravarthy begins to investigate this odd affair.

== Cast ==
- Karthik as Inspector Chakravarthy
- Bhanupriya as Bhanu
- Goundamani as Chinnappa
- V. K. Ramasamy as Ithiraj
- Nizhalgal Ravi as Boopathy
- Major Sundarrajan as Sankaran Nair
- LIC Narasimhan as Pradeep
- Kumarimuthu
- Loose Mohan as Naidu
- Oru Viral Krishna Rao
- Pon. Paramaguru
- Radhabai
- Sharmili as Ujala
- Devi
- Mahima
- Shanthi
- Rajmadhan
- Thillai Rajan as Musical instrument dealer

== Soundtrack ==
The soundtrack was composed by Deva.

Song	Singer(s)	Lyrics	Duration
"Enga Enga Pottivacha"	Mano, S. Janaki	Muthulingam	4:15
"Hello Hello Dear"	S. P. Balasubrahmanyam	Muthulingam	5:07
"Idathu Kaalai"	S. P. Balasubrahmanyam, K. S. Chithra	Pulamaipithan	4:49
"Vaazhe Thoppukulle"	S. Janaki, Mano	Pulamaipithan	4:51

== Reception ==
Malini Mannath of The Indian Express wrote that the film "leaves much to be desired. The director seems a bit confused in his approach."
