= Ponnukku Thanga Manasu =

1973 film by Devaraj Mohan

- Poster
- Directed by: Devaraj–Mohan
- Story by: Balamurugan
- Produced by: P. Madhavan
- Starring: Sivakumar; Jayachitra; Vijayakumar; Vidhubala
- Cinematography: A. Soma Sundaram; P. N. Sundaram (Supervising)
- Edited by: R. Devarajan
- Music by: G. K. Venkatesh
- Production company: Arun Prasad Movies
- Release date: 2 June 1973
- Running time: 143 minutes
- Country: India
- Language: Tamil

Ponnukku Thanga Manasu (transl. The girl has a heart of gold) is a 1973 Indian Tamil-language buddy film, produced by P. Madhavan and directed by Devaraj–Mohan. The film stars Sivakumar, Jayachitra, Vijayakumar and Vidhubala, with Manorama, K. A. Thangavelu and M. R. R. Vasu in supporting roles. It was released on 2 June 1973. The film was remade in Malayalam as Bhoomidevi Pushpiniyayi in 1974.

== Plot ==
Ramu is a poor orphan who dreams of becoming a collector. Shankar, his rich best friend, assists him financially and provides him a place to stay. Geetha and Shanthi are college students and best friends who often clash due to the differences in their beliefs. Geetha is rich, arrogant and feels entitled to special treatment due to her wealth. Shanthi is poor and believes that all people should be treated with respect regardless of wealth. The friendship of both sets of friends ends due to various circumstances. When the four meet years later, Geetha and Shanthi challenge each other over their worldviews. The rest of the story depicts whether the day would be won by wealth or hard work and respect.

== Cast ==
- Sivakumar as Ramu
- Jayachitra as Shanthi
- Vijayakumar as Shankar
- Vidhubala as Geetha
- K. A. Thangavelu
- M. R. R. Vasu
- C. K. Saraswathi
- Manorama
- S. N. Lakshmi
- Sami Kannu
- Chandran Babu as Pakkiri
- I. S. R

== Production ==
Ponnukku Thanga Manasu was directed by duo Devaraj–Mohan making their directorial debut and it was produced by their mentor P. Madhavan under his production company Arun Prasad Movies. The title was derived from a song from Raman Ethanai Ramanadi (1970) directed by Madhavan. Vijayakumar, who was previously a child actor, made his debut in this film as a leading actor.

== Soundtrack ==
Music was composed by G. K. Venkatesh. The song "Thanjavoor Seemayile" was composed by Ilaiyaraaja who was Venkatesh's assistant at that time; however his name was not included in the title credits. The song also marked Muthulingam's debut as lyricist.

Songs	Singers	Lyrics	Length
"Penn Ullame"	P. Susheela, L. R. Eswari	Poovai Senguttuvan	05:13
"Thean Sindhuthey Vaanam"	S. P. Balasubrahmanyam, S. Janaki	Kannadasan	03:42
"Neram Iravu Neram"	L. R. Eswari	Kannadasan	04:04
"Thanjavoor Seemayile"	Sirkazhi Govindarajan, S. Janaki, B.S.Sairekha,Poorani	Muthulingam	06:21

== Reception ==
Kanthan of Kalki favourably reviewed the film for Devaraj–Mohan's direction and Balamurugan's writing. Navamani praised Balamurugan's screenplay and dialogues, acting of star cast and Devaraj-Mohan's direction.
