= Yaaro Ezhuthiya Kavithai =

- Poster
- Directed by: C. V. Sridhar
- Screenplay by: C. V. Sridhar
- Based on: Jananam by Vaasanthi
- Produced by: C. M. Nanjappan; C. M. Aruchamy
- Starring: Sivakumar; Jayashree
- Cinematography: Ashok Kumar
- Edited by: R. Bhaskaran
- Music by: Ananda Shankar
- Production company: Durga Bhagavathi Films
- Release date: 1 May 1986
- Country: India
- Language: Tamil

Yaaro Ezhuthiya Kavithai (pronounced [jaːɾoː eɻuðija kaʋiðaɪ] transl. The poem written by an unknown person) is a 1986 Indian Tamil-language film written and directed by C. V. Sridhar, starring Sivakumar and Jayashree. It is based on the novel Jananam by Vaasanthi. The film was released on 1 May 1986.

== Plot ==
A young woman, Pavithra, is involved in a bus accident and rescued by a doctor, Sivaraman. Pavithra has no memory of who she is and Sivaraman takes her to his home and attempts to cure her. The two fall in love and marry. Yet when Pavithra is cured of her amnesia she wishes to return to her husband. Sivaraman is devastated yet does not blame Pavithra and she returns happily to her first husband.

== Cast ==
- Sivakumar as Dr. Sivaraman
- Jayashree as Pavithra / Lakshmi
- Rajesh as Sudhakar
- Thengai Srinivasan
- Charle as Doctor
- Sethu Vinayagam
- Kovai Sarala

== Soundtrack ==
The soundtrack was composed by Ananda Shankar.

Track listing
No.	Title	Lyrics	Singer(s)	Length
1.	"Paruvam Kanindhu"	Vairamuthu	K. J. Yesudas, Vani Jairam
2.	"Aaha Aayiram"	Mu. Metha	K. J. Yesudas, Vani Jairam
3.	"Idhayam Muzhuthum"	Mu. Metha	Vani Jairam
4.	"Yaar Pogum"	Mu. Metha	K. J. Yesudas
5.	"Naan Paadum"	Vairamuthu	Vani Jairam

== Release and reception ==
Yaaro Ezhuthiya Kavithai released on 1 May 1986 alongside Sridhar's Naanum Oru Thozhilali and it became a rare incident when two films of the same director were released simultaneously. Jayamanmadhan of Kalki felt there were too many shots which were unnecessarily added to increase the runtime but praised the music and humour. Balumani of Anna praised the acting, music, humour and direction.
