= Ayiram Muthangal =

- Title card
- Directed by: Annakkili S. Devarajan
- Screenplay by: Shanmugapriyan
- Produced by: Thirupur Mani
- Starring: Sivakumar; Radha; Jose; Charuhasan
- Cinematography: Visvam Natarajan
- Edited by: T. Rajasekar
- Music by: Shankar–Ganesh
- Production company: Vivekananda Pictures
- Release date: 5 March 1982
- Country: India
- Language: Tamil

Ayiram Muthangal (transl. Thousand Kisses) is a 1982 Indian Tamil-language romance film directed by Annakkili S. Devarajan and produced by Thirupur Mani. The film stars Sivakumar, Radha, Jose and Charuhasan. It was released on 5 March 1982.

== Plot ==
Murali, a law school graduate struggling to make a living and Shakthi are in love but break up due to misunderstandings. Shakthi marries Visu and soon realises his sadistic and violent behaviour. Visu also fosters a friendship with Murali eventually forcing Shakthi and Murali into a confrontation.

== Cast ==
- Sivakumar as Murali
- Radha as Shakthi
- Jose as Visu
- Charuhasan as Raghuram
- Y. G. Mahendran as Raju
- Kallapetti Singaram as Boopathi
- Loose Mohan
- Chandrahasan
- Silk Smitha
- Vanitha as Kanagu
- Karuppu Subbiah
- Pasi Sathya

== Soundtrack ==
Soundtrack was composed by Shankar–Ganesh.

Track listing
| No. | Title | Lyrics | Singer(s) | Length |
|---|---|---|---|---|
| 1. | "Akka" | Poonguyilan | S. Janaki |
| 2. | "Selai Kaipudikka" | Pulamaipithan | S. P. Balasubrahmanyam, Vani Jairam |
| 3. | "Taka Taka" | Pulamaipithan | S. P. Balasubrahmanyam |
| 4. | "Vaasalil" | Vairamuthu | Vani Jairam |

== Reception ==
Kalki said the colourfulness in the title was absent in the film.
