= Vidinja Kalyanam =

1986 film by Manivannan

- Poster
- Directed by: Manivannan
- Produced by: Tiruppur Mani
- Starring: Sathyaraj; Jayashree
- Cinematography: A. Sabapathi
- Edited by: K. Gauthaman
- Music by: Ilaiyaraaja
- Production company: Vivekananda Pictures
- Release date: 1 November 1986
- Running time: 138 minutes
- Country: India
- Language: Tamil

Vidinja Kalyanam (transl. Wedding at dawn) is a 1986 Indian Tamil-language thriller film directed by Manivannan, starring Sathyaraj and Jayashree. It was released on 1 November 1986. The film was remade in Kannada twice as Agni Parva (1987) and Suryodaya (1993).

== Plot ==
Movie begins with a mother (Janaki) and her adult daughter (Divya) in shock looking at the dead body of a man who they apparently just killed. They carry the body in their car and dump it off a cliff. It happens to fall on a man hiding below the cliff (Arumugam) who we learn is a death row convict who escaped from prison. Arumugam destroys the face of the dead man with a rock, and puts on his prison clothes on the body, making it appear as if the dead body is Arumugam.

Janaki and Divya reminisce their past. Raju, the now-dead man, was the son of an MP and keeps harassing Divya in college. Divya however, was in love with Balu. Balu joins the police force and their wedding gets scheduled. Raju is infuriated and goes to Divya's home when she is alone. He bribes her servants, drives them away and tries to molest Divya. Janaki arrives on time and tries to save Divya and ends up killing Raju in the process.

Back in the present - Arumugam traces down Janaki/Divya, tells them what he saw back at the cliff, and demands they give him refuge for a month. They reluctantly agree fearing Arumugam may report them to the police. Janaki suggests Arumugam disguises as her elder brother who is in town for Divya's wedding. Balu is entrusted with investigating Arumugam's "death", and Raju's "disappearance".

Arumugam is browsing Divya's photo album and in suddenly interested in a person in one of the photos. Divya tells Arumugam the person is Ravi, her college friend, and gives him Ravi's whereabouts. Arumugam goes to Ravi's place, removes his disguise and kills him. Coincidentally, Balu arrives there to invite Ravi to his wedding. Ravi manages to tell him about Arumugam before dying. Balu begins to suspect if Arumugam is really dead. He investigates further and establishes the dead body is Raju's through fingerprints and blood group.

Arumugam learns about the circumstances leading to Janaki killing Raju and reminisces his own past. Arumugam works as a servant at a rich person's house. The rich guy and two of his friends, (Ravi is one of the two) send Arumugam away to run some errands, and rape his sister when he was away. Arumugam strikes back at them and ends up killing one of them before police arrest him and send him to prison.

Back in the present, Balu overhears Divya's servants talking about Raju giving them money and going inside the house when Divya was alone. He interrogates them and begins to suspect Janaki and Divya are connected to Raju's killing.

Arumugam tracks down Balaji, the third person who molested his sister and is about to kill him. But Balaji reveals he is innocent, and the third person was actually MP's son Raju, who joined the party after Arumugam left the scene. Balaji had tried to stop them from molesting Arumugam's sister, but the other three beat him up and proceed with their plan. Arumugam now learns all his sister's molesters are killed and prepares to surrender to the police. He tells Janaki he would take the blame for all the killings, since he would have killed Raju anyway. Janaki protests, but Arumugam convinces her that since he cannot escape death sentence for the other 2 killings, it does not matter if one more is added to his name.

Balu and Divya get married the next day. Balu goes to the police station after his wedding, where Arumugam is waiting to surrender. But to Arumugam's surprise, he sees Janaki in handcuffs behind Balu. We learn that Balu established enough grounds to arrest her for killing Raju. It is implied that both Arumugam and Janaki will face charges.

== Cast ==
- Sathyaraj as "Half Boil" Arumugam
- Jayashree as Divya
- Sujatha as Janaki
- Raveendran as Balu
- Vijayakumar as Divya's father
- Senthil as Balu's Friend
- Charle
- Chinni Jayanth
- Thyagu

== Soundtrack ==
Music was composed by Ilaiyaraaja.

Title	Singer(s)	Lyrics	Length
"Kaalam Ilavenil Kaalam"	K. S. Chithra	Vaali	03:58
"Adiyeduthu Nadanthu"	Malaysia Vasudevan, Gangai Amaran, Deepan Chakravarthy, Raghavendra	Pulamaipithan	04:38
"Kaalam Mazhai"	Ilaiyaraaja	Vaali	04:15
"Dance Papa"	Malaysia Vasudevan	Gangai Amaran	03:55

== Reception ==
N. Krishnaswamy of The Indian Express wrote, "Despite the fact that lacks thematic purity [..] The excellent craftsmanship [..] makes you slot it in the above average category."
