= Oru Velladu Vengaiyagiradhu =

1980 Indian Tamil-language film

- Theatrical release poster
- Directed by: Devaraj–Mohan
- Screenplay by: R. M. Veerappan
- Produced by: V. Senthamarai
- Starring: Sivakumar; Saritha
- Cinematography: Marcus Bartley Jr
- Edited by: Vellaichamy
- Music by: M. S. Viswanathan
- Production company: Sathya Movies
- Distributed by: Devi Films
- Release date: 12 January 1980
- Country: India
- Language: Tamil

Oru Velladu Vengaiyagiradhu (transl. A goat becomes a leopard) is a 1980 Indian Tamil-language film directed by Devaraj–Mohan. The film stars Sivakumar and Saritha. It was released on 12 January 1980.

== Cast ==
- Sivakumar
- Saritha
- Vijayakumar

== Production ==
Oru Velladu Vengaiyagiradhu was directed by the duo Devaraj–Mohan and produced by V. Senthamarai under Sathya Movies. The screenplay was written by R. M. Veerappan, and the dialogues were written by Vijay Krishnaraj. Cinematography was handled by Marcus Bartley Jr, and editing by M. Vellaichamy.

== Soundtrack ==
The soundtrack was composed by M. S. Viswanathan, while the lyrics were written by Vaali, Pulamaipithan, Na. Kamarasan and Muthulingam.

Track listing
No.	Title	Singer(s)	Length
1.	"Enakenna Vetkama"	S. P. Balasubrahmanyam
2.	"Maanathil Naangal"	Vani Jairam
3.	"Innum Konjam"	Malaysia Vasudevan, S. Janaki
4.	"Gourava Sabaikku"	Vani Jairam

== Release and reception ==
Oru Velladu Vengaiyagiradhu was released on 12 January 1980, by Devi Films. Kalki negatively reviewed the film, saying the goat in the title was not becoming a leopard, but a bug. However, Naagai Dharuman of Anna praised the film, appreciating the performances of the cast, music, cinematography, dialogues and direction.
