= Unakkaga Piranthen =

- VCD cover
- Directed by: Balu Anand
- Written by: Balu Anand
- Produced by: Tirupur Mani
- Starring: Prashanth; Mohini
- Cinematography: Jayanan Vincent
- Edited by: M. N. Raja
- Music by: Deva
- Production company: Vivekananda Pictures
- Release date: 16 May 1992
- Running time: 140 minutes
- Country: India
- Language: Tamil

Unakkaga Piranthen (transl. I was born for you) is a 1992 Indian Tamil-language romantic drama film, written and directed by Balu Anand, and produced by Vivekananda Pictures. The film stars Prashanth and Mohini. It was released on 16 May 1992.

== Plot ==
Radha is a Sri Lankan refugee, who has taken shelter in a refugee camp in India. When a camp guard tries to molest her, a local man called Krishnan comes to her rescue. They start meeting frequently and soon fall in love. When refugees are ordered back to Sri Lanka, Radha goes. Unable to bear the separation, Krishna decides to swim to Sri Lanka, but on reaching shore he is arrested by coastal guards who think he is a terrorist. Krishna manages to escape from captivity and find Radha.

== Cast ==
- Prashanth as Krishnan
- Mohini as Radha
- Sangeeta as Yamini
- Janagaraj as Radha's grandfather
- Vijay Krishnaraj as a police inspector

== Soundtrack ==
The music was composed by Deva. For the dubbed Telugu version Prema Pujari, all lyrics were written by Rajasri.

Tamil

Song	Singer(s)	Lyrics	Length
"Maama Maama Unai"	Swarnalatha, Mano	Vaali	4:50
"Oh Krishna (Duet)"	S. Janaki, S. P. Balasubrahmanyam	Vaali	4:41
"Oh Krishna (Lady)"	S. Janaki	Vaali	4:48
"Padikkara Vayasula"	S. P. Balasubrahmanyam	Vaali	4:55
"Penn Venum"	S. P. Balasubrahmanyam, Sunandha	Kamakodiyan	4:05

Telugu

Song	Singer(s)	Length
"Oh Radha Oh Radha"	S. P. Balasubrahmanyam	4:47
"Idi Naa Aasayam"	S. P. Balasubrahmanyam	4:44
"Oh Krishna Oh Krishna"	K. S. Chithra	4:55
"Mandaram Mudda Mandaram"	S. P. Balasubrahmanyam, K. S. Chithra	4:10
"Mava Mava"	S. P. Balasubrahmanyam, K. S. Chithra	4:52

== Reception ==
The Indian Express wrote, "Balu Anand, the director, could have geared up the proceedings a bit as the slackness is obvious on certain portions". C. R. K. of Kalki wrote that the film's first half was good, but the director lost grip in the second half and the film became logicless.
