= Vishnu (1995 film) =

- Movie Poster
- Directed by: S. A. Chandrasekhar
- Written by: Gopu Babu (dialogues)
- Screenplay by: S. A. Chandrasekhar
- Story by: Shoba Chandrasekhar
- Produced by: M. Bhaskar; B. Balaji Prabhu
- Starring: Vijay; Sanghavi; Jaishankar
- Cinematography: Viswam Natraj
- Edited by: M. Vellaisamy
- Music by: Deva
- Production company: Oscar Movies National
- Release date: 17 August 1995
- Running time: 152 minutes
- Country: India
- Language: Tamil
- Budget: ₹40 lakh
- Box office: ₹4.1 crore

Vishnu is a 1995 Indian Tamil-language action film directed by S. A. Chandrasekhar, starring Vijay in the main lead role with Sanghavi and Jaishankar. The music was composed by Deva.

The film was released on 17 August 1995 and emerged as a super hit, grossing over ₹1.1 crore against a modest budget of ₹40 lakh. The film was later dubbed in Hindi as Jeeta.

== Plot ==
Vishnu returns to Chennai from London, shocking his wealthy businessman father, Thangadurai, who has been trying to raise him as a timid individual. However, Vishnu yearns for adventure and freedom, rebelling against Thangadurai's overprotective nature, which stems from a deep-seated fear for his son's safety. Thangadurai's employees are unaware of Vishnu's existence, and he orders him to stay confined in a lavish room, deceiving his staff by claiming that Vishnu is an imposter. Muthu, one of Thangadurai's employees, keeps a close watch on Vishnu, believing his boss's words. Vishnu, oblivious to the danger, cleverly manipulates Muthu and escapes from the house while Thangadurai is away. During his escape, he boards a lorry and meets Radha, a lively and chatty girl from Kotagiri who is on her way back home after a brief stint in Chennai.

Vishnu saves Radha from a harassing police officer, earning her trust, and they decide to travel together to Kotagiri without the lorry driver's knowledge. As they journey together, Radha and Vishnu grow closer, falling deeply in love. Meanwhile, in Chennai, Thangadurai is furious upon discovering that Vishnu has gone missing and orders Muthu to find and bring him back. Despite seeing Vishnu up close, Muthu's ineptitude prevents him from capturing the young fugitive. Upon reaching Kotagiri, Vishnu introduces himself as Krishna to Radha's grandfather, Singaravelu Naidu, a devout follower of Lord Vishnu. Naidu, believing Vishnu to be the god's incarnation, welcomes him into his home. Singaravelu Naidu secures a job for Vishnu at the estate owned by Rajamanickam, a man consumed by grief and anger after his son's death, which he blames on Thangadurai. Rajamanickam's sole objective is to kill Thangadurai's son, who he believes is responsible for his loss, and he is waiting for him to return from London.

Vishnu alias Krishna, becomes the estate's tractor driver. When Muthu finally tracks him down, Vishnu cleverly manipulates him into staying at the estate, preventing him from revealing his whereabouts to Thangadurai. Vishnu saves Rajamanickam from a group of goons and bravely fights for fair wages when Koteeswaran, Harichandra's son, tries to cheat him. Impressed by his abilities, Rajamanickam promotes Vishnu as the estate manager at Harichandra's insistence. Vishnu also saves Nirmala, Rajamanickam's wife, from a fire accident, earning the family's gratitude. Rajamanickam and Nirmala are so impressed with Vishnu that they decide to adopt him as their son. Vishnu confesses his love for Radha, and Rajamanickam agrees to their marriage. When Vishnu tries to help Rajamanickam overcome his addiction to alcohol, Rajamanickam asks him to kill Thangadurai's son in return. Vishnu is shocked to realize that Rajamanickam is asking him to kill himself. Meanwhile, Muthu, in an inebriated state, informs Thangadurai that Vishnu is working at Rajamanickam's estate. Thangadurai rushes to Kotagiri, fearing for his son's life of being caught in Rajamanickam's crosshairs.

Thangadurai meets Vishnu in secret and reveals the past, explaining that Rajamanickam's hatred stems from a misunderstanding about his son's death during a dispute over their business partnership. Vishnu decides to investigate and uncover the truth behind Rajamanickam's son's death. Later that night, Harichandra attempts to assassinate Vishnu, but he narrowly escapes and confronts Harichandra, demanding the truth. Harichandra confesses to killing Rajamanickam's toddler son, exploiting the rift between Rajamanickam and Thangadurai to shift the blame. Vishnu pretends to ally with Harichandra, suggesting they join forces to loot Rajamanickam's estate and kidnap him. However, Harichandra double-crosses Vishnu, ordering his men to kill him as well, unaware that Vishnu's alliance was a ruse to extract the truth.

Revealing his true intentions, Vishnu fights off Harichandra's henchmen, and ultimately, Harichandra and his son Koteeswaran meet their demise by falling onto broken glass at the staircase. The film concludes with Thangadurai and Rajamanickam reconciling. Vishnu and Radha, now married, embark on their honeymoon trip, marking their new beginning.

== Cast ==
- Vijay as Vishnu (Krishna)
- Sanghavi as Radha
- Jaishankar as Thangadurai, Vishnu's father
- Senthil as Muthu
- Thalaivasal Vijay as Rajamanickam
- Kalaranjini as Nirmala, Rajamanickam's wife
- Kumarimuthu as a washerman
- Oru Viral Krishna Rao as Manickam
- S. S. Chandran as Harichandra
- Bayilvan Ranganathan as the washerman's nephew
- Manager Cheena as Singaravelu Naidu, Radha's grandfather
- Veera Pandiyan as Koteeswaran, Harichandra's son
- Tharini as the washerman's daughter
- Jyothi Meena in a special appearance as a dancer in the song "Aajare Meri"
- Peter Hein as a henchman (uncredited role)

== Soundtrack ==
The music was composed by Deva with Lyrics by Vaali and Pulamaipithan. The audio rights were acquired by Bravo Music and Pyramid Music.Tune of "Thotta Petta Rottu Mela" was lifted from "Akhiyon Milaoon kabhi", from the Hindi film Raja. "Okay Okay" song's prelude music was lifted from Michael Jackson's "Will You Be There".

Title	Singer(s)	Lyrics	Length
"Aajare Meri"	Swarnalatha, Mano	Vaali	5:16
"Hamma Hamma"	S. N. Surendar, Anuradha Sriram	Vaali	5:11
"Okay Okay"	Suresh Peters	Pulamaipithan	5:12
"Singara Kannukku"	Arunmozhi, K. S. Chitra	Vaali	5:15
"Thotta Petta"	Vijay, Shoba Chandrasekhar	Vaali	5:08
