= Kavikkuyil =

- Theatrical release poster
- Directed by: Devaraj–Mohan
- Screenplay by: Panchu Arunachalam
- Story by: R. Selvaraj
- Produced by: S. P. Tamizharasi
- Starring: Sivakumar; Sridevi; Fatafat Jayalaxmi
- Cinematography: R. N. K. Prasad
- Edited by: B. Kanthasamy
- Music by: Ilaiyaraaja
- Production company: S. P. T. Films
- Release date: 29 July 1977
- Running time: 104 minutes
- Country: India
- Language: Tamil

Kavikkuyil is a 1977 Indian Tamil-language film directed by Devaraj–Mohan. The film stars Sivakumar, Sridevi and Fatafat Jayalaxmi, with S. V. Subbaiah, Rajinikanth and Senthamarai in supporting roles. It was released on 29 July 1977, and failed at the box office.

== Plot ==
Gopal's fascination with the flute is nurtured by his grandfather, Ramaiah Pillai, who enrolls him in music lessons. Gopal's natural talent quickly impresses his instructor. However, he disappears for three days, only to return with a tale of a divine summons to perform at a Krishna temple. While Ramaiah Pillai interprets this as a sign of Gopal's sacred destiny, the villagers view him as aimless and irresponsible, fixated solely on his music and devotion to Krishna.

Chinnaiah Pillai, impressed by Gopal's performance, extends an invitation to play at their village temple in Palayanallur. Still, Gopal declines, citing his commitment to follow divine guidance. Meanwhile, Chinnaiah Pillai's bullock-cart driver, Murugan, is a devoted brother to Radha, and both siblings prioritize self-respect and honest living despite their poverty. Lakshmi, Chinnaiah Pillai's daughter, develops feelings for Murugan and tries to win his affection during their daily commute. As Chinnaiah Pillai plans to arrange a suitor for Radha, Ramaiah Pillai urges Gopal to consider marriage. Gopal, however, is convinced that Krishna will bring him a suitable match, and his dreams lead him to envision Radha as his destined partner; he sets out to find her. Gopal spots Radha in the market, where she's selling vegetables.

Earlier, Radha had walked away while Gopal was performing, leaving him with the impression that she wasn't impressed by his singing. He approaches her and boasts about his musical talents. Radha, intrigued, issues a challenge: if Gopal's connection to the divine is genuine, he should identify her favorite humming raga, which she murmurs when happy, without her revealing it. Gopal composes a song incorporating the elusive raagam, which he sings, astonishing Radha. Convinced that Gopal is her destined husband, Radha falls in love with him. Meanwhile, Lakshmi confesses her feelings to Murugan, but he rejects her, citing their social disparity and explaining that accepting her love would invite Chinnaiah Pillai's wrath and jeopardize his livelihood. Lakshmi promises to persuade her father, but Murugan refuses. Soon, Chinnaiah Pillai arranges Murugan's marriage to Meenakshi, and he reluctantly accepts, devastating Lakshmi.

Meanwhile, Radha and Gopal consummate their relationship, and he vows to formally marry her. Gopal is en route to inform Murugan about his love when he's reminded of his promise to his grandfather to be with him on Krishna Jayanthi. He misses the last bus to his village and walks through the forest, where he's involved in an accident on a stormy night, suffering a severe head injury that robs him of his memory. The villagers rescue him and take him to Ramaiah Pillai. Radha who is left waiting for Gopal, feels betrayed by his absence. Lakshmi informs Meenakshi's father, Veeraiyya, that she loves Murugan and requests that he withdraw Meenakshi's marriage proposal, pretending it was his own decision. She also asks Veeraiyya to keep her feelings for Murugan confidential. Veeraiyya complies, canceling the planned marriage. Weeks pass, and Radha discovers she's pregnant.

Radha and her friend Bhuvana visit Puthunallur village to confront Gopal, only to find he doesn't recall her. Heartbroken, she leaves. Ramaiah Pillai visits Radha's village to investigate her claims and meets Chinnaiah Pillai, learning that Radha belongs to a lower community. Bhuvana reveals to Ramaiah Pillai that Radha is pregnant with Gopal's child. Ramaiah Pillai exploits Gopal's memory loss to prevent a union with Radha, a woman from a lower community, and instead orchestrates a marriage with Lakshmi. Despite Murugan's feelings for Lakshmi, he urges her to marry Gopal, but she resists. Murugan's emotional blackmail, threatening self-harm, ultimately coerces Lakshmi into accepting the marriage. Ramaiah Pillai deceives Gopal, claiming Radha is manipulating him, using his memory loss to her advantage. Gopal believes his grandfather, unaware of the truth. Radha, who had pinned her hopes on Ramaiah Pillai uniting her with Gopal, is devastated to learn of the arranged marriage with Lakshmi.

Ramaiah Pillai offers her ₹10,000 (equivalent to ₹310,000 or US$3,200 in 2026) to stay out of Gopal's life, leaving her heartbroken. Radha agrees to step aside, unwilling to disrupt Gopal's life. At the wedding, Gopal hears Radha's song and regains his memory, stopping the ceremony. He rushes to find Radha, while Chinnaiah Pillai, desperate to salvage his daughter's marriage, arranges for Murugan to marry Lakshmi, reuniting her with her true love. Gopal finds Radha, who is about to attempt suicide, and saves her. He explains the accident and his memory loss, and they reunite, embracing each other.

== Cast ==
- Sivakumar as Gopal
- Sridevi as Radha
- Fatafat Jayalaxmi as Lakshmi/Santhiya
- S. V. Subbaiah as Ramaiya Pillai
- Rajinikanth as Murugan
- Senthamarai as Chinnaiya Pillai
- Master Babloo Jaffar as young Gopal
- Premi as Meenakshi
- Samikannu as Murugan and Radha's uncle
- T. K. S. Natarajan as a music teacher

== Production ==
The film was produced by Panchu Arunachalam's brother Subbu under the production company S. P. T. Films. It was shot at Chikmagalur in 15 days while the climax was shot at Kollimalai.

== Soundtrack ==
The soundtrack was composed by Ilaiyaraaja, who got established as a leading composer in Tamil cinema with this film. The lyrics of the songs are written by Panchu Arunachalam. The song "Chinna Kannan Azhaikkiraan", set in Reetigowla raga, became popular. The flute portions in this song were performed by Sudhakar. Playback singer Sujatha Mohan made her Tamil debut with the song "Kaadhal Oviyam Kandaen", set to Hamir Kalyani raga.

Track listing
| No. | Title | Singers | Length |
|---|---|---|---|
| 1. | "Chinna Kannan Azhaikkiraan" (male) | M. Balamuralikrishna | 03:48 |
| 2. | "Chinna Kannan Azhaikkiraan" (female) | S. Janaki | 04:27 |
| 3. | "Kadhal Oviyam" | Sujatha Mohan | 04:08 |
| 4. | "Kuyile Kavikuyile" | S. Janaki | 05:32 |
| 5. | "Udhayam Varugindradhe" | G. K. Venkatesh, S. Janaki | 04:21 |
| 6. | "Maanodum Paathayile" | P. Susheela | 03:34 |
| 7. | "Aayiram Kodi" | M. Balamuralikrishna | 04:12 |
| Total length: | | | 30:02 |

== Reception ==
Ananda Vikatan rated the film 36 out of 100. Naagai Dharuman of Anna praised the acting, music, cinematography, dialogues and direction. The film failed at the box-office, and Sivakumar felt mixing divine elements in the story of a musician did not work well among the audience.

== Bibliography ==
- Ramachandran, Naman (2014) [2012]. Rajinikanth: The Definitive Biography. New Delhi: Penguin Books. ISBN 978-0-14-342111-5.
- Sundararaman (2007) [2005]. Raga Chintamani: A Guide to Carnatic Ragas Through Tamil Film Music (2nd ed.). Pichhamal Chintamani. OCLC 295034757.
