= Imaigal =

- Theatrical release poster
- Directed by: R. Krishnamoorthy
- Written by: Vinu Chakravarthy (dialogues)
- Produced by: Thiruppur Mani
- Starring: Sivaji Ganesan; Saritha; Sarath Babu; Sudarshan
- Cinematography: N. Balakrishnan
- Edited by: V. Chakrapani
- Music by: Gangai Amaran
- Production company: Vivekananda Pictures
- Release date: 12 April 1983
- Country: India
- Language: Tamil

Imaigal (transl. Eyelids) is a 1983 Indian Tamil-language film, directed by R. Krishnamoorthy and produced by Thiruppur Mani of Vivekananda Pictures. The film stars Sivaji Ganesan, Saritha, Sarath Babu and Sudarshan. It was released on 12 April 1983.

== Plot ==
Akbar Basha is a do-gooder fisherman and don protecting his fishing community against the evil rich man played by Sudarshan. Sudarshan's son cheats Kasthuri, impregnates her and leaves her. Akbar Basha takes her under his wing without knowing that whoever cheated her for Sudarshan's son is the do-gooder himself and joins with Basha to provide legal aid. Basha also has vowed to kill whoever had cheated Kasthuri. Eventually, Sarath Babu is married and at a critical point, to save Akbar Basha, Saritha risks and loses the life of her child. In the end, when Akbar Basha finds out the truth, he goes to kill Sarath Babu who is saved by dying Kasthuri, killing Akbar Basha to save her lover.

== Cast ==
- Sivaji Ganesan as Akbar Baasha
- Saritha as Kasthuri
- Sarath Babu
- Sudarshan
- Y. G. Mahendran
- Goundamani
- Manorama
- V. Gopalakrishnan
- Peeli Sivam
- Rajyalakshmi
- Jayamalini
- Silk Smitha
- Oru Viral Krishna Rao
- Idichapuli Selvaraj
- Vellai Subbaiah

== Production ==
Vinu Chakravarthy took only two characters from a Gujarati film and made a new plot out of it, Imaigal.

== Soundtrack ==
Soundtrack was composed by Gangai Amaran. The song "Madapuravo" is set in the Carnatic raga Mayamalavagowla.

Track listing
No.	Title	Singer(s)	Length
1.	"Enga Rajyathil"	Malaysia Vasudevan, S. P. Sailaja
2.	"Madapuravo"	Malaysia Vasudevan, P. Susheela
3.	"Srilanka"	Malaysia Vasudevan, Vani Jairam
4.	"Ellorum Koopiduranga"	Vani Jairam

== Reception ==
Kalki wrote Ganesan's work, Saritha's performance and Sarath Babu's presence for a meaningless story have gone in vain.
