= Thandikkappatta Nyayangal =

- Theatrical release poster
- Directed by: M. Bhaskar
- Written by: M. Bhaskar
- Produced by: M. Bhaskar
- Starring: Sivakumar; Lakshmi
- Cinematography: T. S. Vinayakam
- Edited by: M. Vellaichami
- Music by: Shankar–Ganesh
- Production company: Oscar Movies
- Release date: 16 September 1983
- Country: India
- Language: Tamil

Thandikkappatta Nyayangal (transl. Punished Justice) is a 1983 Indian Tamil-language film written, produced and directed by M. Bhaskar. The film stars Sivakumar and Lakshmi, with Sivachandran, Rohini and Baby Meena in supporting roles. It was released on 16 September 1983.

== Plot ==
Prabhu is a renowned neurosurgeon who lives with his wife Radha and his daughter Lakshmi. One day he meets his childhood friend Rajesh, an artist. Prabhu is very affectionate to Rajesh as he sponsored his medical studies. Radha does not like Rajesh or his paintings and artwork as it involves nudity and Radha feels it is too vulgar. One day Prabhu brings Rajesh home as he is very ill and forces Radha to take care of him. Radha refuses to touch him and nurse him. But Prabhu convinces her.

On their wedding anniversary, Radha sings a song and suffers breathlessness, Prabhu gives her a resuscitation and calms her to sleep. The next day in his hospital he is appreciated for his success in handling a critical surgery. Prabhu returns home happily, only to find a letter from Radha, that she had defiled herself by sleeping with Rajesh, and she is leaving Prabhu and she takes their daughter Lakshmi along. Devastated by this Prabhu becomes a nomad and wanders around. He meets a sage, who teaches him siddha and asks him to cure people for free. Whether Prabhu meets his wife and daughter and reunites with them forms the rest of the story.

== Cast ==
- Sivakumar as Prabhu
- Lakshmi as Radha
- Sivachandran as Rajesh
- Rohini as Lakshmi
- Baby Meena as young Lakshmi
- R. Dilip
- Vennira Aadai Moorthy
- Senthil as Sokki
- Y. G. Mahendran as Director Sithan Banerjee (Fake)

== Production ==
Thandikkappatta Nyayangal was written, produced and directed by M. Bhaskar under Oscar Movies. Cinematography was handled by T. S. Vinayakam, and editing by M. Vellaichami. The opening scene where Prabhu (Sivakumar) is shown performing a surgery, was filmed at Government General Hospital, Madras after Bhaskar obtained permission.

== Soundtrack ==
The music was composed by Shankar–Ganesh, with lyrics by Pulamaipithan. Poet Muthulingam had also written a song, "Thein Paayum" for this film, but it was not used until Bhaskar's other film Pournami Alaigal (1985), although Muthulingam remained credited.

Track listing
No.	Title	Singer(s)	Length
1.	"Naanum Neeyum" (happy)	S. Janaki	4:50
2.	"Naanum Neeyum" (pathos)	S. Janaki	4:52
Total length:			9:42

== Release and reception ==
Thandikkappatta Nyayangal was released on 16 September 1983. Jayamanmadhan of Kalki wrote it was the director's fault that he tried to build a mud house without proper planning, relying on the iron pillars of Sivakumar's immense energy and Lakshmi's talent. Balumani of Anna praised the acting, cinematography, music and director for choosing a different plot. Sivakumar has named the film one of his personal favourites.
