= Sattathin Thirappu Vizhaa =

- Title card
- Directed by: M. Bhaskar
- Written by: M. Bhaskar
- Produced by: M. Bhaskar
- Starring: Karthik; Shobana; Ravichandran
- Cinematography: Viswam Nataraj
- Edited by: M. Vellaisamy
- Music by: Shankar–Ganesh
- Production company: Oscar Movies
- Release date: 16 June 1989
- Running time: 144 minutes
- Country: India
- Language: Tamil

Sattathin Thirappu Vizhaa (transl. Opening ceremony of Law) is 1989 Indian Tamil-language legal thriller film written, produced and directed by M. Bhaskar. The film stars Karthik, Shobana and Ravichandran, with Nizhalgal Ravi, Kuyili and Rajesh in supporting roles. It was released on 16 June 1989. This movie was an unofficial remake of Nalla Theerpu released in 1959. A lot of plot points were borrowed.

== Plot ==
When Rajesh, a lawyer, learns that his father Gandhiram is alive and imprisoned for a murder he did not commit, he decides to reopen the case. His biggest obstacle is his lover's father, a prosecutor.

== Cast ==
- Karthik as Rajesh
- Shobana as Radha
- Ravichandran as Ethiraj
- Major Sundarrajan as DCP Devasagayam
- Nizhalgal Ravi as Gandhiram
- Sumithra as Balamma
- Kuyili as Ponni
- Rajesh as Prabhu Das
- Delhi Ganesh as Inspector Boopathy
- Vennira Aadai Moorthy as Punniyam
- A. R. Srinivasan as Church Father
- Veera Raghavan as Judge

== Soundtrack ==
The soundtrack was composed by Shankar–Ganesh.

Song	Singers	Length
"Oh Vennila"	S. P. Balasubrahmanyam, K. S. Chithra	05:20
"Javadhu Santhana Poovu"	S. P. Balasubrahmanyam, S. Janaki	04:52
"Innum Enthan"	K. J. Yesudas	05:04
"Rama Rama Hare"	S. Janaki	04:40
"Inbame Inbame"	S. Janaki	04:50

== Reception ==
P. S. S. of Kalki wrote the plot is so clever that somehow, there is a kind of tension. Laughter moments are just desert oasis.
