= Uravadum Nenjam =

- Directed by: Devaraj–Mohan
- Written by: Shanmugapriyan
- Based on: Vilimbu by Shanmugapriyan
- Produced by: V. Kanthasamy; Devaraj; Mohan
- Starring: Sivakumar; Chandrakala
- Music by: Ilaiyaraaja
- Production company: Sri Vishnupriya Creations
- Release date: 27 November 1976
- Country: India
- Language: Tamil

Uravadum Nenjam (transl. Kind Heart) is a 1976 Indian Tamil-language film directed by Devaraj–Mohan and written by Shanmugapriyan, starring Sivakumar and Chandrakala. The film is based on the play Vilimbu by Shanmugapriyan. It was released on 27 November 1976. A dubbed Malayalam version Aaru Manikkoor (transl. Six Hours) was released in 1978.

== Cast ==
- Sivakumar
- Chandrakala
- Suruli Rajan
- Y. G. Mahendran

== Production ==
The story of Uravadum Nenjam was conceived by Shanmugapriyan and prepared in 30 minutes. He also wrote the screenplay. It was adapted from his stage play Vilimbu. The film was launched on 21 April 1976 at Vauhini Studios and it was the debut production venture of Sri Vishnupriya Creations.

== Soundtrack ==
The soundtrack was composed by Ilaiyaraaja.

Song	Singers	Length
Oru Naal Unnodu Oru Naal	S. P. Balasubrahmanyam, S. Janaki	04:12
Ninaithathellam Nadakkappora	S. P. Balasubrahmanyam, S. Janaki	03:10
Dear Uncle	Malaysia Vasudevan	03:28

== Reception ==
According to Sivakumar, the film failed at the box-office as audience felt the film did not have the right ending.
