= Neruppile Pootha Malar =

- Title card
- Directed by: Kausic
- Written by: Kausic
- Produced by: A. M. Sathiyanesan
- Starring: Sivakumar; Poornima
- Cinematography: R. Sampath
- Edited by: S. I. Perumal; R. Rajagopal
- Music by: K. V. Mahadevan
- Production company: Elizabeth Productions
- Release date: 13 March 1981
- Country: India
- Language: Tamil

Neruppile Pootha Malar (transl. The flower that bloomed in fire) is a 1981 Indian Tamil-language film written and directed by Kausic. The film stars Sivakumar and Poornima. It was released on 13 March 1981.

== Cast ==
- Sivakumar as Lawrence
- Poornima as Mary
- Sathaar as Mary's uncle
- V. Gopalakrishnan
- Y. G. Parthasarathy
- Udayasankar
- V. P. Nayyar
- Ponnamma

== Production ==
Neruppile Pootha Malar was written and directed by Perumal of Nagercoil, using the stage name Kausic, and produced by A. M. Sathiyanesan of Elizabeth Productions. Cinematography was handled by R. Sampath, and editing by S. I. Perumal and R. Rajagopal. Principal photography began on 14 April 1980 at Maryland Studios. After completing the shooting there, Kausic went to Kanyakumari and spent ten days shooting at Lady Immaculate Middle School, the church on the east coast of Kanyakumari, the Virgin Mary statue on the West Coast, Gandhimandapam, Vivekananda Mandapam, Swimming Pool and then Chittar Dam. The climax scene began filming on 30 October at St. Lourdes Temple, Chetpet, and involved over 3000 extras.

== Soundtrack ==
The soundtrack was composed by K. V. Mahadevan.

Track listing
No.	Title	Lyrics	Singer(s)	Length
1.	"Athimaram Poopathillai"	Pulamaipithan	Malaysia Vasudevan
2.	"Iravinil Paniyinil Iruvarum"	Kannadasan	Vani Jairam, P. Jayachandran
3.	"Engengum Aval Mugam"	Kannadasan	P. Jayachandran

== Release and reception ==
Neruppile Pootha Malar was released on 13 March 1981. When the film was screened for Sivakumar's friends at the Savera Hotel, his sons Suriya and Karthi, who were also present, reacted with shock at the climax as it involved their father's character being mercilessly beaten. Nalini Sastry of Kalki panned the film, and felt Poornima only acts through laughing and crying.
