= Samsaram (1951 film) =

1951 Indian Tamil-language drama film

- Poster of Samsaram
- Directed by: Chandru (Tamil); S. S. Vasan (Hindi)
- Screenplay by: Ki. Ra.
- Based on: Samsaram (1950)
- Produced by: S. S. Vasan
- Starring: M. K. Radha; Pushpavalli
- Cinematography: P. Ellappa
- Edited by: M. Umanath Rao
- Music by: Emani Sankara Sastry; M. D. Parthasarathy (Supervisor)
- Production company: Gemini Studios
- Release date: 19 October 1951
- Country: India
- Languages: Tamil; Hindi

Samsaram (/səmsɑːrəm/ transl. Wife) is a 1951 Indian Tamil-language drama film directed by Chandru and produced by S. S. Vasan. A remake of the 1950 Telugu film of the same name, it stars M. K. Radha, Pushpavalli, Kumari Vanaja, Sriram, M. S. Sundari Bai, T. R. Ramachandran, D. Balasubramaniam, R. Balasubramaniam, K. N. Kamalam, and Kamalaveni Ammal. The film was simultaneously filmed in Hindi as Sansar (/sənsɑːr/), which Vasan directed. Samsaram was released on 19 October 1951.

== Plot ==
A struggling clerk lives with his wife and two children. Their blissful lives are threatened by the arrival of his scheming mother and sister. A short time later, the clerk disappears, abandoning his family, and his brother comes to their rescue. Exploiting the fragile situation, mischief makers suggest an immoral relationship between the clerk's brother and wife. Frustrated, the clerk's wife sends her two children to beg on the streets. Meanwhile, her brother-in-law leaves to look for her missing husband so he can clear his name, and fix the family. Several years later, the elder of the two children, now working at a mill, meets a bearded beggar who, unknown to him, is actually his father. He gets his father a job at the mill, and the family later reunites.

== Cast ==
Cast (Tamil)	Cast (Hindi)	Role (Tamil)	Role (Hindi)
Pushpavalli		Manjula	Laxmi
M. K. Radha		Gopu	Narayan
Vanaja		Kamala	Kamala
Sriram	Swaraj	Venu	Madan
M. S. Sundari Bai	Gulab	Kamakshi	Ganga
T. R. Ramachandran	Agha	Seetharam	Seetharam
Kamalaveni Ammal	Mohana	Vengamma	Jamna
D. Balasubramaniam	J. S. Casshyap	Kanakasabapathy	Jugalji Seth
R. Balasubramaniam	David	Doctor	Doctor
K. N. Kamalam	Meera	Chellamma	Saraswathi
Sethu	Kazam	Balu (adult)	Gopi (adult)
Anil Kumar		Balu (child)	Gopi (child)
Krishnaveni		Saroja (adult)	Roopa (adult)
Rathnapapa		Saroja (child)	Roopa (child)
Vijay		Mohan	Mohan
Rangaswami		Manjula's father	Laxmi's father
Ramakrishna Rao		Kondal Rao	Popat Lal
G. V. Sharma	—	Ramaiah	Ramaiah
Venkat		A. L. Kam, Kamala's cousin	A. L. Kam, Kamala's cousin
Sadasiva Rao		Office Manager	Office Manager
G. S. Bindumadhavan		Sub-Inspectors	Sub-Inspectors
Mukharji	Rajkumar	Sub-Inspectors	Sub-Inspectors
Ishwarlal	—	Seth	Seth
Vijaya Rao		Subanna	Dinu
Sakku Bai	Balamani	Nagamma	Dayavati
Ram Kumar	B. S. Kalla	Car Owner	Car Owner

== Production ==
S. S. Vasan, the owner of Gemini Studios, screened the Telugu film Samsaram for his staff, family and friends. Impressed with the film, he bought the rights to remake it in two languages: Tamil and Hindi. The Tamil remake shared its title with the Telugu film, while the Hindi version was titled Sansar. Both versions were launched simultaneously; Chandru, the chief editor of Gemini, directed the Tamil version. Because South Indians actors of the era could not speak Hindi fluently, Vasan had the voices of the South Indian cast dubbed for Sansar, which he directed.

== Soundtrack ==
Emani Sankara Sastry was the music director, and his work was supervised by M. D. Parthasarathy. Kothamangalam Subbu wrote the lyrics. A. M. Rajah made his singing debut with this film, and his song "Samsaram... Samsaram..." became a breakthrough in his career.

Samsaram (Tamil)

Song	Singer
"Aararo Aararo Arumai Kumara"	P. Leela
"Maanilathil Vidhiyai Ventra"	A. M. Rajah
"Samsaram Samsaram"	A. M. Rajah
"Kada Kada Loda Loda Vandi"	A. M. Rajah, Jikki
"Enathu Manam Kanavilum"	Jikki
"Amma Pasikuthe"	Jikki, Sarojini
"Ezhai Engu Selvaen"	P. Leela
"Avar Mella Mella"	Jikki

Sansar (Hindi)

Song	Singer
"Yeh Sansar, Yeh Sansar"-1	Talat Mahmood
"Yeh Sansar, Yeh Sansar"-2	Talat Mahmood
"Mit Nahin Sakta Kabhi Likha"	Talat Mahmood
"Amma Roti De, Baba Roti De"-1	Lata Mangeshkar
"Amma Roti De, Baba Roti De"-2	Lata Mangeshkar
"Aisi Hai Duniya"	Lata Mangeshkar
"Pyara Hamara Munna"	Lata Mangeshkar
"Jiya Lehar Lehar Lehraye"-1	Lata Mangeshkar
"Jiya Lehar Lehar Lehraye"-2	Lata Mangeshkar
"Khat Khat Gaadi"	Lata Mangeshkar
"Lakhnau Chalo Ab Rani, Bambai Ka Bigda Pani"	Geeta Dutt, G. M. Durrani
"Hum Hi Ne Mohabbat Ki Duniya Basayi"	Geeta Dutt, P. Leela

== Reception ==
Both Samsaram and Sansar were released in 1951 and became commercially successful. According to historian Randor Guy, the success of the former was attributed to its "emotionally strong and sentimental storyline", elements, and the performances of Radha, Pushpavalli, Sriram, Vanaja, Sundari Bai and Ramachandran. However, journalist Kalki Krishnamurthy gave the film a negative review in his magazine Kalki, where he criticised the song "Amma Pasikkuthey, Thaaye Pasikkuthey" by arguing that "no mother would ever stoop to that level". In Japan, the film was released under the title Such Is Life. The story of Samsaram was again reused in Tamil as Thunai Iruppal Meenakshi (1977).

== Bibliography ==
- Ashokamitran (2016). Fourteen Years with Boss. India: Penguin Books. ISBN 978-0-14-342329-4.
