= Kannan Oru Kai Kuzhandhai =

1978 film by N. Venkatesh

- Theatrical release poster
- Directed by: N. Venkatesh
- Written by: N. Venkatesh
- Produced by: Tirupur Mani
- Starring: Sivakumar; Sumithra
- Cinematography: A. Venkat
- Edited by: T. R. Sekhar
- Music by: Ilaiyaraaja
- Production company: Vivekananda Pictures
- Release date: 8 September 1978
- Running time: 133 minutes
- Country: India
- Language: Tamil

Kannan Oru Kai Kuzhandhai (transl. Kannan is a baby) is a 1978 Indian Tamil-language film directed by N. Venkatesh and produced by Tirupur Mani. The film stars Sivakumar and Sumithra. It was released on 8 September 1978, and did not do well at the box-office.

== Plot ==
Kannan, an educated man, who joins a radio shop, where Vasantha is working as a typist, gets an accommodation in the same building where Vasantha is residing by bluffing that he has a widowed mother. When Vasantha and her mother pester him to bring his mother, he makes a shady character, Vasu's mother, who had left him in desperation, to pose as his mother. Vasu's mother sacrifices her life in trying to save Kannan from her son. Vasantha and Kannan are united.

== Cast ==
- Sivakumar
- Sumithra
- Sathyaraj
- Sowcar Janaki
- Manorama as the heroine's mother
- Jai Ganesh
- Major Sundarrajan
- Suruli Rajan
- Neelu
- Sathyapriya

== Production ==
Kannan Oru Kai Kuzhandhai was the second film for Sathyaraj as actor, and first as production manager. In the opening credits, he was billed by his real name S. N. Rangaraj for his role as the production manager, and by his stage name Sathyaraj for his acting role. The film was directed by N. Venkatesh, and produced by Tirupur Mani under Vivekananda Pictures.

== Soundtrack ==
The soundtrack was composed by Ilaiyaraaja. The song "Megame Thoothaga Vaa" is set in the Carnatic raga known as Pahadi.

Track listing
No.	Title	Lyrics	Singer(s)	Length
1.	"Kaalai Ilam"	Bharathidasan	S. P. Balasubrahmanyam
2.	"Kannan Aruge"	Pulamaipithan	Vani Jairam
3.	"Megame Thoodhaga"	Kannadasan	S. P. Balasubrahmanyam, P. Susheela
4.	"Moga Sangeetham"	Kannadasan	P. Susheela

== Release and reception ==
Kannan Oru Kai Kuzhandhai was released on 8 September 1978, and did not do well at the box-office. According to Sivakumar, if a film is full of fight scenes and tragic events, it would not satisfy everyone, so it became ridiculous to make a weak story by relying only on comedy. Anna praised the acting of cast, Ilayaraja's music, Venkat's cinematography and Venkatesh's direction.
