= Kaaval Dheivam =

1969 film by K. Vijayan

- Theatrical release poster
- Directed by: K. Vijayan
- Based on: Kai Vilangu by Jayakanthan
- Produced by: S. V. Subbaiah
- Starring: Sivaji Ganesan; Sivakumar; Lakshmi; Nagesh
- Cinematography: Vijayan
- Music by: G. Devarajan
- Production company: Ambal Productions
- Release date: 1 May 1969
- Running time: 145 minutes
- Country: India
- Language: Tamil

Kaaval Dheivam (transl. Guardian deity) is a 1969 Indian Tamil-language drama film, directed by K. Vijayan and produced by S. V. Subbaiah. An adaptation of the novel Kai Vilangu (transl. Handcuff) by Jayakanthan, the film stars Sivakumar, Sowcar Janaki, Lakshmi and Nagesh, while Sivaji Ganesan makes an extended cameo appearance. The film was a moderate success at the box-office. It was remade in Kannada as Devara Mane (1985).

== Plot ==
- Aanaikundram Jail. Superintendent K. Raghavan is a man of integrity who views the 500 inmates as 500 books that need to be perused. He stays with his wife Alamel in the bungalow adjoining the penitentiary, and the childless couple treats the prisoners with compassion and love, looking upon the inmates as the children they never had. Chamundi who is serving a life sentence for killing one of the 2 villains who had fatally molested his teenage daughter Sivakami.
- In the nearby Allikkulam village lives Manickam, an honest, hardworking youth who is the leaseholder of Raghavan's lands. Manickam and Gokila love each other. The scoundrel Marimuthu, an unwelcome suitor of Gokila, sees his dreams of marrying Gokila coming to naught, and schemes with his accomplices to harm Manickam. They spy on Manickam and Gokila singing and romancing, and this increases their ire. Marimuthu accosts Manickam near the Aiyanar statue. When Marimuthu speaks deprecatingly of Manickam's lineage, Manickam sees red. He plucks the sword from the hands of the Aiyanar statue and injures Marimuthu. Manickam is arrested and sentenced to 5 years imprisonment. Superintendent Raghavan consoles him and treats him with kindness. With the unusual backdrop of a prison, original story author " Jayakanthan " endows each character with an interesting history and subtle idiosyncrasies.
- The story then captures the interesting events in the prison. Of particular interest are the sequences that involve Samundi. Samundi sees the other man who was responsible for his daughter's death as an inmate in the prison and manages to hack him to death one night. For this crime, Samundi is sentenced to death, and the death sentence is carried out. In the meantime, Manickam gets the news that his mother is seriously unwell. He grieves for her and longs to pay her a visit. On his own accord Superintendent Raghavan takes the unprecedented step of permitting Manickam to go to Allikulam to see his mother, after eliciting a promise from him that he would return to the prison by daybreak. The next day is Raghavan's last day in service, and Raman Nayar arrives to take charge as the new superintendent. Manickam has not yet returned, and Raman Nayar refuses to take charge until the headcount tallies with the roster. Raghavan is confident that Manickam will return, and his confidence is not misplaced. Manickam arrives just in the nick of time. Raghavan retires; his honour and reputation untarnished.

== Cast ==
- Sivaji Ganesan as Marameri Samundi
- Sivakumar as Manickam
- Lakshmi as Gokila
- R. Muthuraman as Saiyathu Bai
- S. V. Subbaiah as Raghavan
- Sowcar Janaki as Alamel
- Sriranjani as Rangamma
- M. N. Nambiar as Raman Nayar
- S. A. Ashokan as Marimuthu
- O. A. K. Thevar as Mioner
- V. Gopalakrishnan as Head of police Officer
- T. S. Balaiah as Sangili Pillai
- V. K. Ramasamy as Subbaiya Pillai
- Nagesh as Kesavan
- G. Sakunthala as Poongavanam
- Usilai Mani as Panchayat Kambathukarar
- Kuladeivam Rajagopal as Villupattu Singer's
- Shanmugasundari as Villupattu Singer's
- Karuppu Subbiah as Jail Wanted
- K. Kannan as Sundaramoorthy
- M. R. Krishnamurthy

== Production ==
After acting in several films, S. V. Subbaiah decided to venture into production. He chose to adapt Kai Vilangu, a novel of Jayakanthan; the film adaptation would be titled Kaaval Deivam. It is the directorial debut of K. Vijayan. M. R. Krishnamurthy made his film debut with this film. Sivaji Ganesan, who made an extended cameo appearance, completed his portions in five days in between the schedules of Uyarndha Manithan upon that film's producer M. Saravanan's permission.

== Soundtrack ==
The soundtrack was composed by G. Devarajan, while the lyrics were written by Mayavanathan, Thanjai Vaanan & Nellai Arulmani.

Song	Singers	Length
"Allahvin Dhayavaale"		00:50
"Porappadhum Poradhum Iyarkai"	T. M. Soundararajan	03:21
"Aiyanaaru Neranja Vaazhvu"	Dharapuram Sundararajan & P. Susheela	03:50
"Aiyan Enbom"	Kuladeivam Rajagopal, Krishnamoorthy, Krishnan, Shanmugasundari & Andal	02:19
"Maiyal Migavum Meerudhe"	Radha Jayalakshmi	02:80

== Release and reception ==
Kaaval Dheivam was released on 1 May 1969. Ananda Vikatan, in a review dated 8 June 1969, praised the film for its story, the cast performances and the cinematography. The Indian Express in its review dated 3 May 1969 called it "a conventional picture and a departure from the usual Tamil film" and concluded "The technical side is not an asset to the film but despite these drawbacks, it is a warmly recommendable family picture".

== Bibliography ==
- Rajadhyaksha, Ashish; Willemen, Paul (1998) [1994]. Encyclopaedia of Indian Cinema. British Film Institute and Oxford University Press. ISBN 0-19-563579-5.
- Saravanan, M. (2013) [2005]. AVM 60 Cinema (in Tamil) (3rd ed.). Rajarajan Pathippagam. OCLC 1158347612.
