= Devaraj–Mohan =

A directing duo in the Indian film industry

- Occupation: Film director

Devaraj–Mohan was a directing duo of the Indian film industry, mainly of Tamil-language films. They were known for quality films made on a low budget, thus giving a very reasonable profit for almost every film. The duo is also notable for launching one of the most prolific Indian composers, Ilaiyaraaja through their film Annakili.

Actor Sivakumar played the lead in most of their films. After 1980, the duo split and Devaraj directed some films. Mohan died in 2012, and Devaraj died by 2018.

== Filmography ==
Year	Film	Notes
1973	Ponnukku Thanga Manasu	
1974	Kanmani Raja	
1975	Anbu Roja	
1975	Uravu Solla Oruvan	
1976	Ungalil Oruthi	
1976	Annakili	
1976	Paalooti Valartha Kili	
1976	Uravadum Nenjam	
1977	Kavikkuyil	
1977	Sainthadamma Sainthadu	
1978	Vazha Ninaithal Vazhalam	
1978	Chittu Kuruvi	
1979	Rosappu Ravikkaikari	
1979	Poonthalir	
1979	Chakkalathi	
1980	Oru Velladu Vengaiyagiradhu	
1980	Ilayarajavin Rasikai	Unreleased
1980	Kannil Theriyum Kathaikal	
1982	Ayiram Muthangal	Directed by S. Devarajan
1982	Kavithai Malar	Directed by S. Devarajan
1985	Rajathi Rojakili	Directed by S. Devarajan
1986	Isai Paadum Thendral	Directed by S. Devarajan
1989	Annakili Sonna Kathai	Directed by S. Devarajan
