= Indru Nee Naalai Naan =

- Title card
- Directed by: Major Sundarrajan
- Based on: Thookku Mara Nizhalil by C. A. Balan
- Produced by: Pala. Karuppiah; S. Sampath
- Starring: Sivakumar; Jaishankar; Lakshmi; Sulakshana
- Cinematography: T. S. Vinayagam
- Edited by: B. Kandhasamy
- Music by: Ilaiyaraaja
- Production company: Geetha Kamalam Movies
- Release date: 12 August 1983
- Country: India
- Language: Tamil

Indru Nee Naalai Naan (transl. Today you, tomorrow me) is a 1983 Indian Tamil-language film, directed by Major Sundarrajan. The film stars Sivakumar, Jaishankar, Lakshmi and Sulakshana. It is based on the novel Thookku Mara Nizhalil by C. A. Balan. The film was released on 12 August 1983.

== Plot ==
Pazhaniappan is an orphan living in a village and is employed in Marudhachalam's home right from his childhood. Marudu’s parents treat Pazhani as their own son. Marudu is the village president and aspires to achieve big in politics. Papathi lives in a nearby village and it is tough to find a groom for her as her mother happened to be a concubine for a local landlord and hence no one prefers to marry Papathi. Valli is the childhood friend of Papathi. One day, Pazhani sees Papathi and suggests that she marry Marudu as Marudu does not believe in caste system and leads several social economic reforms in the village. Marudu also likes Papathi and they marry.

Marudu leaves for politics related work on the same day of marriage much to the disappointment of Papathi as he is expected to return only after a month or so. Meanwhile, love blossoms between Pazhani and Valli and they marry. Marudu returns home after a month and his father is angered to know that Marudu has paid Rs. 1 lakh as bribe to his party seniors to get him an MLA seat in the upcoming elections. Every day, Marudu is occupied with the upcoming election and he has no time to spend with Papathi which makes her to long for his love. Valli becomes pregnant but Papathi feels bad that she has not even got intimate with Marudu. Unfortunately, Marudu loses the election which makes him a drunkard. Marudu's father passes away due to heart attack. Marudu feels dejected due to his defeat in elections and his health is spoiled due to constant drinking habit. Finally, Marudu dies.

Valli gives birth to a baby girl and Papathi decides to take care of the baby as she is left with no one in life. Slowly, Papathi develops an affection towards Pazhani although she could understand that what she does is not right. Valli gets pregnant again and goes to her mother’s home for delivery. Now, Papathi proposes her love to Pazhani and she thinks that Valli would allow this considering Papathi’s situation. Pazhani feels confused but decides to support Papathi by marrying her. However, he changes his mind later and leaves to see Valli who has delivered a baby boy.

Valli realises the issue between Pazhani and Papathi and is infuriated. She fights with Papathi and Pazhani scolds her. Valli feels heartbroken and kills herself. Pazhani’s enemy, a local goon, makes a complaint to revenge Pazhani that Pazhani has killed Valli for marrying Papathi. He also produces false witnesses. Pazhani is declared to be guilty in the court for murdering Valli and receives the death penalty. On the day before his hanging, Papathi comes to meet Pazhani in jail where Pazhani requests her to marry someone else and start a new life. However, Papathi shoots herself and dies in front of Pazhani. Pazhani gives a social message in the prison that never think of an extra marital affair and his life is a wrong example for the same. In the end, Pazhani is hanged to death.

== Cast ==
- Sivakumar as Pazhaniappan
- Jaishankar as Marudhachalam
- Lakshmi as Papathi
- Sulakshana as Valli
- Thengai Srinivasan as Doctor
- Manorama as Kamalam
- Major Sundarrajan as a police officer

== Production ==
Indru Nee Naalai Naan was based on the novel Thookku Mara Nizhalil by C. A. Balan which was inspired from true events of his life. It was directed by Major Sundarrajan, his second directorial after Kalthoon (1982) and was produced by his younger brother Sampath alongside Pala. Karuppiah. The film was launched on 12 October 1982. The song "Kaangeyam Kaalaigale" was shot at Aathur Road, Salem. The scenes were also shot at Salem Prison with special permission. L. R. Shanmugam's home at Salem was used as Sivakumar's house for the film.

== Soundtrack ==
Music was composed by Ilaiyaraaja. The song "Ponvaanam Panneer Thoovuthu" is set in the Carnatic raga Gourimanohari, and follows a 7/8 time signature. Writer Suka said the song uses the "spirit of the rain" to evoke love.

Song	Singer(s)	Lyrics
"Vaa Pulla Nalla Pulla"	S. P. Balasubrahmanyam, S. P. Sailaja	Gangai Amaran
"Thalampoove Kannurangu"	S. P. Balasubrahmanyam, S. Janaki, Uma Ramanan	Vairamuthu
"Ponvaanam Panneer Thoovuthu"	S. Janaki	Vairamuthu
"Mottu Vitta Mullai Kodi"	S. Janaki, S. P. Sailaja	Vairamuthu
"Kangeyam Kaalaikale"	S. P. Balasubrahmanyam, Gangai Amaran, Saibaba, Sudhakar	Gangai Amaran

== Release and reception ==
Indru Nee Naalai Naan was released on 12 August 1983. Jayamanmadhan of Kalki praised the performances of the actors and Ilaiyaraaja's music and concluded by praising Sundarrajan for properly narrating a story but felt the end monologue could have been avoided.
