= Majaal =

- Theatrical release poster
- Directed by: K. Bapaiah
- Written by: Kader Khan (dialogues)
- Screenplay by: Paruchuri Brothers
- Story by: M. Bhaskar
- Based on: Pournami Alaigal by M. Bhaskar
- Produced by: Srikanth Nahata
- Starring: Jeetendra; Sridevi; Jaya Prada
- Cinematography: A. Venkatesh
- Edited by: D. Venkataratnam
- Music by: Bappi Lahiri
- Production company: Vijayalakshmi Pictures
- Release date: 24 April 1987
- Running time: 158 minutes
- Country: India
- Language: Hindi

Majaal (transl. Audacity) is a 1987 Indian Hindi-language drama film, produced by Srikanth Nahata under the Vijayalakshmi Pictures banner and directed by K. Bapaiah. The film stars Jeetendra, Sridevi, Jaya Prada and music composed by Bappi Lahiri. It is a remake of the Telugu film Sravana Sandhya (1986) which itself was remade from Tamil film Pournami Alaigal (1985).

== Cast ==
- Jeetendra as Vijay Kumar
- Sridevi as Sadhana
- Jaya Prada as Sandhya
- Prem Chopra as Amritlal
- Kader Khan as Advocate Kailashnath Chaudhary
- Raj Kiran as Rakesh
- Raza Murad as Sunil Kapoor
- Sadashiv Amrapurkar as Shyamu
- Mehmood as Shrichand Titarmare
- Asrani as Doodhnath
- Satyendra Kapoor as Judge Ramprasad
- Shreeram Lagoo as Pujari Vishnu Prasad
- Anjana Mumtaz as Sharda
- Vikas Anand as Inspector Ishwarlal
- Yunus Parvez as Inspector Khanna

== Soundtrack ==
Lyrics: Indeevar

Song	Singer
"Hay Rama, Hay Rama"	Kishore Kumar, Asha Bhosle
"Sharabon Se Kya Mujhko Kaam"	Kishore Kumar, Asha Bhosle
"Ting Ting Ghanti Baje, Dil Mein Ghanti Baje"	Kishore Kumar, Asha Bhosle
"Tum Into Main, Main Into Tum, Equal To Pyar Ke Sau Saal"	Kishore Kumar, Asha Bhosle
"Itni Kisi Ki Majaal Kahan, Chheene Mujhse Murliwala"	Mohammed Aziz, Asha Bhosle
