= Vijayalakshmi (film) =

- Promotional poster
- Directed by: P. Pullaiah
- Screenplay by: A. T. Krishnaswamy
- Based on: Bandaachi Soon by Ganesh Krishna Shastri Pathak
- Starring: B. R. Panthulu; M. V. Rajamma; T. R. Ramachandran; M. J. Andal; S. V. Subbaiah; Sowdhamini
- Cinematography: P. Subba Rao
- Music by: G. Govindarajulu Naidu
- Production company: Star Combines
- Distributed by: Pragathi Pictures
- Release date: 8 November 1946 (India)
- Country: India
- Language: Tamil

Vijayalakshmi is a 1946 Indian Tamil language film directed by P. Pullaiah. The film stars B. R. Panthulu and M. V. Rajamma.

== Plot ==
The story revolves around a man's greed for money, his exploitation and ill-treatment of women, (with the complicity of his wife) and his scant respect for the rights or feelings of women in general. The demonetisation of 500, 1000 and 10,000 rupee notes by the government of the day leads to the climax of the story.

== Cast ==
B. R. Panthulu as seen in the film

- B. R. Panthulu
- M. V. Rajamma as Vijayalakshmi
- T. R. Ramachandran
- M. J. Andal
- S. V. Subbaiah
- Sowdhamini

== Production ==
Vijayalakshmi is based on the Marathi stage play Bandaachi Soon by Ganesh Krishna Shastri Pathak.

== Soundtrack ==
Music was scored by G. Govindarajulu Naidu.

== Reception ==
The film did not succeed commercially.
