= Bhoomidevi Pushpiniyayi =

- Directed by: Hariharan
- Written by: Balamurukan; S. L. Puram Sadanandan (dialogues)
- Screenplay by: S. L. Puram Sadanandan
- Produced by: P. K. Kaimal
- Starring: Prem Nazir; Madhu; Sukumari; Jayabharathi, Vidhubala
- Cinematography: Melli Irani
- Edited by: M. S. Mani
- Music by: G. Devarajan
- Production company: Thirumeni Pictures
- Distributed by: Thirumeni Pictures
- Release date: 29 November 1974
- Country: India
- Language: Malayalam

Bhoomidevi Pushpiniyayi is a 1974 Indian Malayalam-language film directed by Hariharan and produced by P. K. Kaimal. The film stars Prem Nazir, Madhu, Sukumari and Jayabharathi in the lead roles and features a musical score by G. Devarajan. It was a remake of the Tamil film Ponnukku Thanga Manasu.

== Plot ==
Jagadeesh invites his stepmother wrath's when he welcomes into his home his old friend Sethumadhavan, who does not have a place to stay.

== Cast ==
- Prem Nazir as Sethumadhavan
- Madhu as Jagadeesh
- Sukumari as Bhanu
- Jayabharathi as Indu
- KPAC Lalitha as Meenakshi
- Adoor Bhasi as Menon
- Muthukulam Raghavan Pillai as Panicker
- Sankaradi as Pachupilla
- Mookkannoor Sebastian
- Bahadoor as Appunni
- K. P. Ummer as Madhava Menon
- Meena as Doctor
- Santo Krishnan
- Vidhubala as Jaya

== Soundtrack ==
The music was composed by G. Devarajan and the lyrics were written by Vayalar Ramavarma.

No.	Song	Singers	Lyrics	Length (m:ss)
1	"Chorathudikkum"	K. J. Yesudas, K. P. Brahmanandan	Vayalar Ramavarma	3:23
2	"Danthagopuram"	P. Madhuri	Vayalar Ramavarma	3:20
3	"Nadikal Nadikal"	K. J. Yesudas, P. Madhuri, Chorus	Vayalar Ramavarma	4:54
4	"Paathiraathanuppu"	P. Susheela	Vayalar Ramavarma	3:09
5	"Panineer Mazha"	K. J. Yesudas	Vayalar Ramavarma	3:24
6	"Panthayam Oru Panthayam"	P. Madhuri, L. R. Eeswari, Chorus	Vayalar Ramavarma	3:10
7	"Thirunellikkaattilo"	P. Jayachandran, P. Madhuri	Vayalar Ramavarma	
