= Poonthalir =

- VCD cover
- Directed by: Devaraj–Mohan
- Screenplay by: Thuraiyur K. Murthy
- Story by: Chetan Anand
- Starring: Sivakumar; Sujatha
- Cinematography: Marcus Batley
- Edited by: M. Vellaisamy; M. Kesavan
- Music by: Ilaiyaraaja
- Production company: S. M. Creations
- Release date: 13 July 1979
- Country: India
- Language: Tamil

Poonthalir (transl. Budding flower) is a 1979 Indian Tamil-language film, directed by Devaraj–Mohan, starring Sivakumar and Sujatha. It is a remake of the Hindi film Aakhri Khat (1966). The film, Sivakumar's 101st as an actor, was a success.

== Plot ==
Ashok, an artist/sculptor, falls in love with and marries Maya, a poor Keralite woman, but they become separated when Ashok leaves for a prolonged assignment in the United States. When he comes back after a few years and looks for his wife, he receives a letter from her that conveys a strange message to him and he soon finds out that she has died due to a terminal illness and that their child has gone missing. He then starts a desperate search for this lost child with the help of a dedicated police officer. Meanwhile, the child a year old or so, wanders around the city and eventually reaches his father's house. Ashok reunites with his son.

== Cast ==
- Sivakumar as Ashok
- Sujatha as Maya
- Master Anand
- Suruli Rajan
- Manorama
- Sivachandran

== Soundtrack ==
The music was composed by Ilaiyaraaja.

| Song title | Lyrics | Singers | Duration |
|---|---|---|---|
| "Gnaan Gnaan Paadanum" | M. G. Vallabhan | Jency | 4:09 |
| "Vaa Ponmayile" | Panchu Arunachalam | S. P. Balasubrahmanyam | 3:23 |
| "Raja Chinna Raja" | Panchu Arunachalam | P. Susheela | 4:30 |
| "Manathil Yenna Ninaivugalo" | Panchu Arunachalam | S. P. Balasubrahmanyam, S. P. Sailaja, Sujatha Mohan | 7:38 |
| "Kannin Mani Ennai Kandupidi" | M. G. Vallabhan | S.P. Sailaja | |
