= M. Bhaskar =

Indian film director

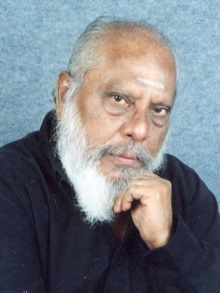
- Born: 3 April 1935; Pattamputhur, Madras Presidency, British India
- Died: 12 July 2013 (aged 78); Chennai, Tamil Nadu, India
- Education: Presidency College
- Occupations: Story writer, screenwriter, dialogue writer, director, producer
- Years active: 1978-2013
- Organization: Oscar Movies
- Spouse: Meena Rani
- Children: 3

M. Bhaskar (3 April 1935 – 12 July 2013) was an Indian filmmaker who worked mainly in the Tamil film industry. Bhaskar started his film career as an assistant to director C. V. Sridhar. After relieving from his mentor and guru C. V. Sridhar, he was working under Sundaram's Modern Theaters, Chinnappa Thevar along with S. P. Muthuraman, Panju Arunachalam, Thuyavan, Uthiripookkal Balakrishnan and others. He also worked as a second unit Director for 20th Century Fox, during their production in Goa, India.

== Early life and career ==
M. Bhaskar hailed from a village called Pattamputhur, Virudhunagar district. He started his career as an associate to C. V. Sridhar starting from movie Venniradai followed by list of notable films he worked Kodimalar, Nenjirukkum Varai, Ooty Varai Uravu, Avalukendru Or Manam, Sivantha Mann, Uttharavindri Ulle Vaa also in Hindi films Pyar Kiye Jaa, Gehri Chaal, Nai Roshni, Dharti. He made his directorial debut with Bairavi. The film gave major breakthrough in the career of Rajinikanth as a lead actor. Rajini gained the tag "Superstar" from this film.

Bairavi is a 1978 Tamil feature film directed by M. Baskar and starring Rajinikanth. It was Rajinikanth's first movie as a solo hero in Tamil cinema. He was also given the "Superstar" title through this film. The film stars Sripriya as the female lead and Geetha playing the title role as Rajini's sister. Geetha was introduced in this film. Srikanth played the role of the main villain. Malayalam actor Sudheer played Bairavi's step brother, while Manorama and Suruli Rajan played other major roles.

M Baskar who was impressed with Rajini's dedication in Aarupushpangal, went straight ahead casting Rajini in lead role for Bhairavi. M Baskar, having faith in Rajini to pull the crowds as hero. Initially, Sandow M. M. A. Chinnappa Thevar agreed to give financial support for Bhairavi but when he heard Rajini is the hero, he withdrew the support and advised M Baskar to stop the movie or change the hero. He questioned M Baskar for choosing a villain in the lead role and hero as villain (Srikanth was acting as hero those days) and he assured to M Baskar that it will be a huge loss. M Baskar approached Muthuraman to play negative role but he refused to portray a negative character, Srikanth was finally selected for the role. With all these burden, M Baskar decided to direct the film.

The soundtrack and background score was composed by Ilaiyaraaja. Bairavi was the third film for Ilaiyaraaja. All lyrics were penned by Kannadasan.

Then he started his own production company "Oscar Movies" in 1980.Some of the Bhaskar's hit movies as a director and producer includes Theerpugal Thiruththapadalam, Soolam, Sattathin Thirappu Vizhaa, Chakravarthy. He then produced films Vishnu, Kadhal Rojave and Thotta. Vishnu is the first movie that Vijay acted in others production. Vijay earlier movies were produced by his father. Also Vijay honored his first producer Balaji prabhu during his Jilla movie audio launch in December 2013.

M Bhaskar was four times 'Secretary' of "Tamil Film Producers' Council" from (1987–2000), when his contemporary legends Kovai Chezhian, K Balachander, Bharathiraja and KRG were 'President'. He also served the 'South Indian Producers' Guild' as Secretary. He was also the vice-president of South Indian Directors' Association. He served the 'South Indian Film Chamber of Commerce' for three decades. M Bhaskar along with Bharathiraja rose the Tamil Film Producers' Council's funds from a meager INR 26 to INR 2,00,000 during his tenure of service. M Bhaskar was considered to one of pillars of Tamil Film Producers' Council for reviving it from the financial crisis. He also served as Censor Board Member of Central Board of Film Certification, Government of India for many years. He was also an outside expert for sponsored Programme of Doordarshan Kendra, Chennai for a long period.

Bhaskar initially signed Prashanth for Kadhal Rojavae, but he got offer from S. Shankar for movie Jeans. Considering his career Bhaskar agreed to release prashanth from Kadhal Rojavae. Then he decided to introduce son of former actress Sheela to debut in his production Kadhal Rojavae also introduced Pooja Kumar as a heroine in 1997.According to the deal signed, Vishnu was not supposed to act in any other film until Kadhal Rojavae had been completed and released. However, during production, Vishnu could not wait and starred in a Malayalam film, while Keyaar was still shooting causing a rift between the actor and producer Bhaskar during the making of the project. Pooja Kumar, who was crowned Miss India USA in 1995, was selected to make her debut as heroine and during production she was signed and dropped from other Tamil films of the period including V. I. P and Chinna Raja. The actress notably returned more than a decade later starring in the lead role in Kamal Haasan's bilingual Vishwaroopam. Kadhal Rojavae released after a delay in production in 2000.

== Personal life and death ==
Bhaskar was married to Meena Rani. They have two sons and a daughter. Bhaskar died on 13 July 2013 at the age of 78 due to a heart attack.

== Filmography ==
Year	Film	Credited as			Language	Notes
Year	Film	Director	Writer	Producer	Language	Notes
1975	Innum Oru Meera	✓			Tamil	
1978	Bairavi	✓			Tamil	Rajinikanth's first film as a protagonist, debut of Geetha.
1980	Soolam	✓	✓	✓	Tamil	Rajkumar Sethupathi introduced as a protagonist.
1982	Pakkathu Veetu Roja	✓			Tamil	
1982	Theerpugal Thiruthapadalam	✓	✓	✓	Tamil	
1983	Dhandikappata Nyayangal	✓	✓	✓	Tamil	
1984	Oru Sumangaliyude Katha		✓		Malayalam	
1985	Pournami Alaigal	✓	✓	✓	Tamil	
1986	Panneer Nadhigal	✓	✓	✓	Tamil	
1986	Sravana Sandhya		✓		Telugu	
1987	Majaal		✓		Hindi	
1989	Sattathin Thirappu Vizhaa	✓	✓	✓	Tamil	
1991	Ellam Ungal Nanmaike	✓	✓	✓	Tamil	
1995	Chakravarthy	✓	✓	✓	Tamil	
1995	Vishnu			✓	Tamil	
2000	Kadhal Rojavae			✓	Tamil	Pooja Kumar introduced as a lead actress in this film.
2008	Thotta			✓	Tamil	
2011	Oothari			✓	Tamil	Unreleased
