= Kanmani Raja =

- Theatrical release poster
- Directed by: Devaraj–Mohan
- Written by: Balamurugan
- Produced by: P. K. V. Sankaran; Arumugam
- Starring: Sivakumar; Lakshmi
- Cinematography: A. Somasundaram
- Edited by: R. Devarajan
- Music by: M. S. Viswanathan
- Production company: Muthuvel Movies
- Release date: 24 March 1974
- Country: India
- Language: Tamil

Kanmani Raja is a 1974 Indian Tamil-language drama film directed by Devaraj–Mohan and written by Balamurugan. The film stars Sivakumar and Lakshmi, with M. N. Rajam, Manorama, Kumari Padmini and Thengai Srinivasan in supporting roles. It was released on 24 March 1974.

== Plot ==
The story follow the romance and marriage of Selvam (Sivakumar), the son of a wealthy businesswoman, and Janaki (Lakshmi), a poor shop assistant. However, his mother's extreme possessiveness and controlling behavior create a severe household rift, ultimately forcing Janaki to separate and raise their child alone.

== Cast ==
- Sivakumar as Selvam
- Lakshmi as Janaki
- M. N. Rajam
- Manorama
- Kumari Padmini
- Usha
- Thengai Srinivasan
- Rajapandian
- Senthamarai
- Master Raghuraman

== Production ==
A scene was shot at AVM Studios in early September 1973. The filming was also held at Kodaikanal.

== Soundtrack ==
The music was composed by M.S. Viswanathan with lyrics by Kannadasan.

Track listing
No.	Title	Singer(s)	Length
1.	"Kaathal Valaiyada"	S. P. Balasubrahmanyam, P. Susheela
2.	"Oodam Kadal Ooram"	S. P. Balasubrahmanyam, P. Susheela
3.	"Yai Machan"	L. R. Eswari
4.	"Naan Aanaiyittal"	D. Pushpalatha

== Reception ==
Kanthan of Kalki praised the acting of Sivakumar, Lakshmi and Rajam and added it is necessary to add flavour by adding many delicious programs, but they have made it impossible to enjoy anything by adding all the things they saw and called Devaraj–Mohan's direction as good but Balamurugan's story and dialogues as disappointing. Navamani praised the dialogues, acting and direction. The film did not do well at the box office.
