= Jayashree (Tamil actress) =

Indian actress

- Born: Chennai, Tamil Nadu, India
- Occupation: Actress
- Years active: 1985–present
- Spouse(s): Chandrasekhar (m. 1988–present)
- Children: 2

Jayashree is an Indian actress who has mostly worked in Tamil-language films. She was introduced by film director C. V. Sridhar in Thendrale Ennai Thodu, opposite Mohan, in 1985. She started a career in technology in 2000, taking a break from acting after her marriage.

== Career ==
Jayashree started her cinematic career with the 1985 Tamil filmThendrale Ennai Thodu, opposite Mohan. After getting married in 1988, she left the film industry to focus on her family, and later began a career in technology. She returned to acting with the 2010 film Kadhal 2 Kalyanam, though it was never released. On Christmas Day 2016, Jayashree's comeback film Manal Kayiru 2 was released internationally.

== Personal life ==
Jayashree is the granddaughter of S. Jayalakshmi, singer and actress, and grandniece of musician and painter S. Rajam and musician and filmmaker S. Balachander, both her grandmother's brothers. She married Chandrasekhar, a banking professional, in 1988, and they settled in the United States. The couple have two sons.

== Selected filmography ==
- Note: All films in Tamil, unless otherwise noted.

Year	Film	Role	Notes	Reference
1985	Thendrale Ennai Thodu	Malathi		
1985	Irandu Manam	Shanthi		
1986	Veendum	Lalitha	Malayalam film	
1986	Kaalamellam Unn Madiyil	Rani		
1986	Kovil Yaanai	Kaveri		
1986	Manithanin Marupakkam	Sujatha		
1986	Vidinja Kalyanam	Divya		
1986	Nambinar Keduvathillai	Gowri		
1986	Anandha Kanneer	Radha		
1986	Panneer Nadhigal	Radha		
1986	Mounam Kalaikirathu	Shobana		
1986	Yaaro Ezhuthiya Kavithai	Pavithra/Lakshmi		
1987	Kavalan Avan Kovalan	Herself	Guest appearance	
1987	Thirumathi Oru Vegumathi	Nandhini		
1987	Vanna Kanavugal	Anandhi		
1987	Thaali Dhanam	Nirmala		
1987	Anand	Geetha		
1988	Premayanam	Sneha	Telugu film	
1989	Nalaya Manithan	Shree		
1989	Varam	Jaya		
1997	Pistha	Shanthi		
1997	Vivasaayi Magan	Selvi		
1997	Masmaram	Madhavi	Malayalam film	
2010	Kadhal 2 Kalyanam		Unreleased	
2016	Manal Kayiru 2	Uma Kittumani		
