= Annakili =

1976 film by Devaraj Mohan

- Theatrical release poster
- Directed by: Devaraj–Mohan
- Screenplay by: Panchu Arunachalam
- Story by: R. Selvaraj
- Produced by: P. Thamizharasi
- Starring: Sivakumar; Sujatha
- Cinematography: A. Somasundaram
- Edited by: B. Kanthasamy
- Music by: Ilaiyaraaja
- Production company: S. P. T. Films
- Release date: 14 May 1976
- Running time: 134 minutes
- Country: India
- Language: Tamil

Annakili is a 1976 Indian Tamil-language romantic drama film, directed by Devaraj–Mohan and written by Panchu Arunachalam from a story by R. Selvaraj. The film stars Sivakumar and Sujatha with S. V. Subbaiah, Srikanth, Thengai Srinivasan and Fatafat Jayalaxmi in supporting roles. It was produced by S. P. Thamizharasi under the production banner SPT Films. The film's soundtrack was composed by Ilaiyaraaja, who made his debut in film. A. Somasundaram and B. Kanthasamy handled cinematography and editing respectively.

A black-and-white film, Annakil was released on 14 May 1976, and became a commercial success. It attained cult status in Tamil cinema. The film won the Filmfare Award for Best Film – Tamil, and was screened at the Indian Panorama section of the International Film Festival of India in 1978. It was remade in Telugu as Rama Chilaka (1978).

== Plot ==
In Thengumarada, a village in the region of Sathyamangalam, a young woman named Annakili falls in love with Thyagarajan, the newly arrived local teacher. But as he has to support his mother and sister financially, Thyagarajan marries another girl, Annakili's friend Sumathi, daughter of a wealthy landowner. Azhagappan, a womaniser, director of the local cinema theatre, then wants to marry Annakili but she refuses. In retaliation and in order to blackmail Annakili into marrying him, he later kidnaps Thyagarajan's young son and spreads rumours about Annakili among the villagers. Annakili manages to save the child from the cinema building that has caught fire during her struggle with Azhagappan. She escapes with the child, and dies in Thyagarajan's arms.

== Cast ==
- Sivakumar as Thyagarajan
- Sujatha as Annakili
- S. V. Subbaiah as Vadivel Ambal
- Srikanth as Magudapathy
- Thengai Srinivasan as Azhagappan
- Vennira Aadai Moorthy as Azhagappan's right hand man
- Senthamarai as Madasamy
- Fatafat Jayalaxmi as Sumathi
- Manimala as Thyagarajan's sister
- M. N. Rajam
- S. N. Lakshmi as Thyagarajan's mother

== Production ==
When Ilaiyaraaja met Panchu Arunachalam, the latter asked if the former had composed any songs; Ilaiyaraaja casually sang a bunch of songs, one of which was "Annakkili Unnai Theduthe". An impressed Panchu Arunachalam decided to write a screenplay based on these songs and on the story Marathuvechi written by R. Selvaraj to accommodate these songs; the film would be titled Annakili. The filming began at Pannari near Coimbatore where the song "Sondhamillai Bandhamillai" was shot. While scouting for various locations, it was Sivakumar who finally zeroed in and suggested a village Thengumarahada situated at Nilgiris district which had only 10 homes and mostly has huts where they primarily shot the film except for the climax which was shot in Chennai and Salem Ratna Studios. The filming was completed within a month. The film was made on a shoestring budget under ₹4 lakh (worth ₹4.7 crore in 2021 prices) The climax, featuring a theatre being set on fire, was inspired by the 1942 film Kannagi. It was shot on a theatre set built on Ratna Studios at Salem. That scene was filmed in three units; with director P. Madhavan, mentor of Devaraj-Mohan filmed some shots of it.

== Soundtrack ==
The soundtrack was composed by Ilaiyaraaja, who made his debut as composer with this film, and the lyrics were written by Panchu Arunachalam. Ilaiyaraaja used the techniques of modern film music orchestration, fusing Indian and Western classical music with Tamil folk. The soundtrack became hugely popular and its success established Ilaiyaraaja as a leading composer in Tamil cinema. "Machanai Paartheengala"—which Ilaiyaraaja composed and sung at a marriage before the film's release—eventually became a huge success.

== Release and reception ==
Annakili was released on 14 May 1976. Many distributors refused to buy the film as they felt it looked like an art film, which led Arunachalam to sell the film to new distributors at a lower price. Ananda Vikatan, in a review dated 30 May 1976, was positive towards the film, particularly the performances of Sujatha, Sivakumar and Srikanth, but felt it would have been better in colour. Nagai Dharman of Navamani praised the story, dialogues, acting, music and direction. According to Sivakumar, the response for first two shows were poor, it picked up only on the third day due to positive word-of-mouth. According to an article in the magazine Link, the film "took Tamil audiences by storm". The film ran successfully for 25 weeks and celebrated silver jubilee and it ran for 205 days in Irudhaya Theatre at Kovai. It won the Filmfare Award for Best Film – Tamil, and also received ₹1 lakh (equivalent to ₹33 lakh or US$34,000 in 2026) subsidy from the government of Tamil Nadu.

== Legacy ==
Annakili attained cult status in Tamil cinema. Writing for The News Minute, Nandhu Sundaram noted that the film, "Made during the first wave of feminism in Tamil cinema heralded by directors Bharathiraaja, K Balachander, Balu Mahendra and Mahendran, Annakili came as a powerful crash course in gender equality".

== Bibliography ==
- Baskaran, S. Theodore (1996). The Eye of the Serpent: An Introduction to Tamil Cinema. Chennai: East West Books. OCLC 243920437.
- Dhananjayan, G. (2014). Pride of Tamil Cinema: 1931–2013. Blue Ocean Publishers. OCLC 898765509.
- Greene, P. D. (2001). "Authoring the Folk: the crafting of a rural popular music in south India". Journal of Intercultural Studies. 22 (2) (2nd ed.): 161–172. doi:10.1080/07256860120069585. S2CID 143604516.
