= Soolam =

- Poster
- Directed by: M. Bhaskar
- Written by: M. Bhaskar
- Produced by: M. Bhaskar
- Starring: Rajkumar; Radhika
- Music by: Ilaiyaraaja
- Production company: Oscar Movies
- Release date: 12 December 1980
- Country: India
- Language: Tamil

Soolam (transl. Trident) is a 1980 Indian Tamil-language film produced, directed and written by M. Bhaskar. The film stars Rajkumar and Radhika, with Sudheer, Pushpalatha, Thengai Srinivasan and Manorama in supporting roles. It was released on 12 December 1980.

== Cast ==
- Rajkumar
- Radhika as Annamma
- Sudheer as Peter
- Pushpalatha
- Thengai Srinivasan
- Manorama

== Production ==
Soolam is the first film produced by Bhaskar through his company Oscar Movies.

== Soundtrack ==
The soundtrack was composed by Ilaiyaraaja.

Track listing
No.	Title	Lyrics	Singer(s)	Length
1.	"Naan Devathai"	Kannadasan	S. Janaki
2.	"Nee Sigappu"	Pulamaipithan	S. Janaki
3.	"Julie"	Vairamuthu	Malaysia Vasudevan
4.	"Soolam"	Vairamuthu	S. Janaki and Chorus
