= Kovai Khadar Ayyamuthu =

Indian freedom fighter and writer

Kovai Ayyamuthu
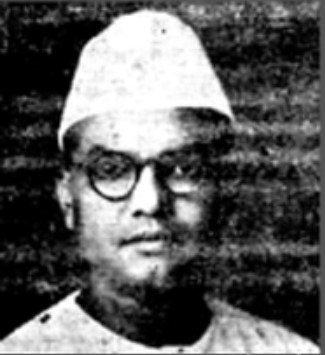
- Born: December 1898; Paranchervazhi, Kangayam, Tiruppur, Madras Presidency, British India
- Died: 21 December 1975 (aged 76–77)

Kovai Ayyamuthu (also known as Kovai Kadar Ayyamuthu, December 1898 – 21 December 1975) was an Indian Gandhian freedom fighter and writer. He was an active member of the Indian National Congress and one of the prominent leaders of the Sarvodaya movement. He participated in the Indian independence movement and his writings contributed to the movement. He was imprisoned several times for his involvement in the freedom struggle.

== Life and career ==
Ayyamuthu was born in present-day Kangayam Taluk of Tiruppur district to Angannan Gounder and Marakkal. He was married to Govindammal in the year 1921. Ayyamuthu was an important leader in Sarvodaya Movement. Being a good friend of EVR Periyar, he was mentored by C. Rajagopalachari.

Govindammal actively participated and involved in various agitation and the couple were jailed numerous times. In the year 1924 Kovai Ayyamthu participated in Vaikom Satyagraha. He also played pivotal role in Kadar organisation in the Coimbatore region. After independence Ayyamuthu and Govindammal set up the "Gandhi Pannai" on the Coimbatore Pollachi road. And their house was named as "Rajaji Illam".
