= A. R. Srinivasan =

Indian actor

Alangadu Ramamurthi Srinivasan
- Born: 8 April 1933 (age 93); Madras, India
- Other names: A. R. Srinivasan; A. R. S.
- Education: Karanathan Koil Govt. School
- Occupations: Actor and lawyer
- Years active: Since 1963

Alangadu Ramamurthi Srinivasan (born 8 April 1933), popularly known as A. R. S., is an Indian stage, television and film actor. He was introduced to theatre by veteran dramatist Y. G. Parthasarathy.

With a career spanning over 50 years, Srinivasan is a recipient of Kalaimamani and Central Sangeet Natak Academy Puraskar awards.

== Early life ==
Born in Madras city to A. S. Ramamurthi and A. R. Saraswathi, Srinivasan studied and qualified as a lawyer. Upon graduation, Srinivasan worked for Philips. In his young days, Srinivasan was also a good cricketer and played club cricket for Sea Hawks and Madras South Zone. He was a classmate of Cho Ramaswamy in law college.

== Career ==
In 1962, Tamil theatrist Y. G. Parthasarathy noticed Srinivasan at a cultural show and asked him to join his theatre group, United Amateur Artists (UAA). After some initial reluctance, Srinivasan joined the group and worked with UAA for over five decades. In 1964, Srinivasan got his first film role in the Telugu movie Raman Parasuraman. Since then, Srinivasan has acted in a handful of movies, mostly in supporting roles as a police officer or Jesuit priest.

Starting from the 1980s, when India's state television channel Doordarshan began broadcasting in Tamil, Srinivasan has played prominent roles in television operas and presented documentaries. He is still active on television playing supporting roles in two television soaps - Aval, broadcast on Vijay TV and Suryaputri on Kalaignar TV and occasionally, plays small parts on the stage as well.

== Partial filmography ==
- Oh Manju (1976) - debut
- Poonthalir (1979)
- Samanthipoo (1980)
- Raman Parasuraman (1980)
- Meendum Kokila (1981)
- Ranga (1982)
- Ilamai Kaalangal (1983)
- Thai Veedu (1983)
- Naan Mahan Alla (1984) as Saravanan's father
- Thendrale Ennai Thodu (1985)
- Nayakan (1987)
- Jallikattu (1987 film)
- Paadu Nilave (1987)
- Kodi Parakkuthu (1988)
- Sattathin Thirappu Vizhaa (1989)
- Inaindha Kaigal (1990)
- Kaviya Thalaivan (1992)
- Watchman Vadivel (1994)
- Bombay (1995)
- Friends (2001)

== See also ==
- List of Indian film actors
