= Sivakumar =

Indian actor (born 1941)

- Sivakumar in 2016
- Born: Palaniswamy; 27 October 1941 (age 84); Sulur, Coimbatore, Madras Presidency, British India (present-day Tamil Nadu, India)
- Occupations: Actor; Visual artist
- Years active: 1965–2005
- Spouse: Lakshmi Kumari (m. 1974)
- Children: Suriya; Karthi; Brindha
- Relatives: Jyothika (daughter-in-law)

Palaniswamy (born 27 October 1941), known by his stage name Sivakumar, is an Indian visual artist and former actor who has appeared in Tamil cinema and television. He made his acting debut in Kaakum Karangal (1965) and has worked in 195 movies, predominantly in Tamil cinema. He has won three Filmfare Awards South and two Tamil Nadu State Film Awards.

== Career ==
He was a student of the Government College of Art & Craft in Chennai from 1959 to 1965.

Palaniswamy made his acting debut in Kaakum Karangal (1965) with the actor S. S. Rajendran. Palaniswamy was renamed Sivakumar when he joined the industry.

Sivakumar's notable movies include Saraswathi Sabatham (1966), Kandhan Karunai (1967), Thirumal Perumai (1968), Uyarndha Manithan (1968), Annakili (1976), Rosappu Ravikkaikari (1979) and the very famous K. Balachander’s Sindhu Bhairavi (1985).

He won the Filmfare Award for Best Actor – Tamil for the movies Rosappu Ravikkaikari (1979), and Vandichakkaram (1980) and a Lifetime Achievement Award – South (2007). He also was the recipient of the Tamil Nadu State Film Award for Best Actor for Avan Aval Adhu (1980) and Agni Sakshi (1982).

He played the hero in melodramas Bhadrakali (1976), Vandichakkaram (1980), Indru Nee Naalai Naan (1983), Paasa Paravaigal (1988) or devotional tales Vellikizhamai Viratham (1974), Thaai Mookaambikai (1982) and romantic sagas Chittu Kuruvi (1978), Rosappu Ravikkaikari (1979) and Unnai Naan Santhithen 1984). He also played hero in many films which were adapted from novels like Manithanin Marupakkam (1986).

After a successful career as a lead actor, Sivakumar proved his mettle as a character artist in films like Kadhalukku Mariyadhai (1997), Sethu (1999) and Poovellam Un Vaasam (2001).

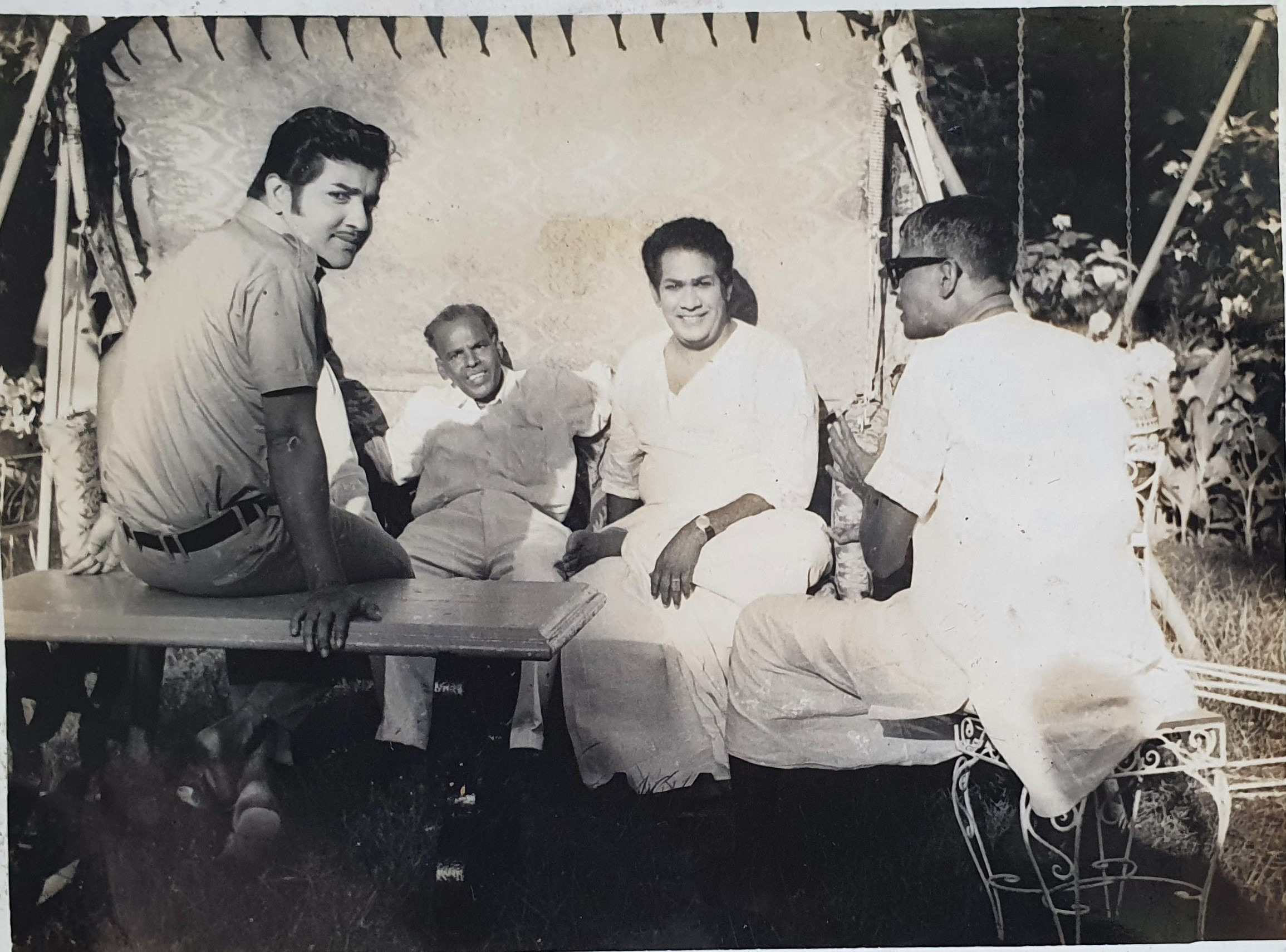
Young Sivakumar at Kataya Kalyanam movie location

During his career, Sivakumar has co-starred with many leading Tamil actors, including M. G. Ramachandran, Sivaji Ganesan, Gemini Ganesan, S. S. Rajendran, R. Muthuraman, A. V. M. Rajan, Jaishankar, Ravichandran, Kamal Haasan, Rajinikanth, Vijayakanth, Sathyaraj, Prabhu, Karthik, Mohan, Sarath Kumar, Arjun Sarja, Ajith Kumar, Vijay, Vikram and Suriya.

He acted in famous TV serials like Chithi and Annamalai alongside Radhika.

In 2012, Sivakumar was honoured with the Jaya TV Lifetime Achievement Award at the Anna Centenary Library for his contributions to the Tamil film industry for over 40 years. Sivakumar has also ventured into public speaking, giving his opinion on various subjects, including Hindu theology. He has been praised for the fluency and style of his speeches.

== Personal life ==
Sivakumar was born on 27 October 1941 in Coimbatore. He is married to Lakshmi Kumari. The couple have three children: two sons Suriya and Karthi, who are both actors; and a daughter Brindha, who is a playback singer. Sivakumar's elder daughter-in-law Jyothika is an actress. He is a devout Hindu and a devotee of Murugan. He is also ambidextrous.

Sivakumar seen with his sons actors Suriya and Karthi

== Filmography ==
=== As an actor ===
Year	Title	Role	Notes
1965	Kaakum Karangal	Surendar	
1966	Motor Sundaram Pillai	Gopal	
1966	Thaaye Unakkaga	Raju	
1966	Saraswathi Sabatham	Vishnu	
1967	Kandhan Karunai	Murugan	
1967	Kaavalkaaran	Chandran	
1967	Kan Kanda Deivam	Servant	
1968	Thirumal Perumai	Vishnu	
1968	Panama Pasama	Shankar's brother-in-law	
1968	Jeevanamsam	Sabapathi	
1968	Uyarndha Manithan	Sathyamurthy	
1969	Kaaval Dheivam	Manickam	
1969	Kanni Penn		
1969	Annaiyum Pithavum		
1970	Vilaiyattu Pillai	Manickam	
1970	Ethiroli	Sundaram	
1970	Kasturi Thilakam	Balu	
1970	Thirumalai Thenkumari	Sekhar	
1970	Navagraham	Vatsala's lover	
1971	Thirumagal	Ramu	
1971	Kankaatchi	Shankar	
1971	Therottam	Ravi	
1971	Moondru Deivangal	Kumar	
1971	Annai Velankanni	Rangaiah	
1971	Babu	Prem	
1971	Annai Abirami	Naga Devatha	
1972	Agathiyar	Tholkappiyar	
1972	Bala Bharatam	Vishnu	Telugu film
1972	Kurathi Magan	Ice cream man	Guest Appearance
1972	Shakthi Leelai	Naratha Muni	
1972	Idhaya Veenai	Kirymani	
1972	Deivam	Subramaniyam	
1973	Ganga Gowri	Mahadevan	
1973	Arangetram	Thangavelu	
1973	Bharatha Vilas	Shankar	
1973	Rajaraja Cholan	Prince Rajendra Chola I	
1973	Shanmugapriya		Guest Appearance
1973	Ponnukku Thanga Manasu	Ramu	
1973	Sontham	Siva	
1973	Thirumalai Deivam	Vishnu / Srinivasan	
1973	Kattila Thottila	Sambhasivam	
1973	Karaikkal Ammaiyar	Shiva	
1973	Pennai Nambungal	Raghu	
1973	Sollathaan Ninaikkiren	Raghavan	
1974	Thirumangalyam	Murali	
1974	Tiger Thathachari	Kumaraguru	
1974	Sisupalan	Krishna	Guest Appearance
1974	Maanikka Thottil	Bhaskar	Guest Appearance
1974	Kanmani Raja	Selvam	
1974	Dheerga Sumangali	Babu	
1974	Vellikizhamai Viratham	Nagarajan	
1974	Gumasthavin Magal	Ramu	
1974	Onne Onnu Kanne Kannu	Ramu	
1974	Paadha Poojai	Ramesh	
1974	Engamma Sapatham	Kumaran	
1974	Thaai Pasam	Moorthy	
1974	Panathukkaga	Ramesh	
1975	Enga Pattan Sothu	Saravana	
1975	Puthu Vellam	Pachai Kanna	
1975	Then Sindhudhe Vaanam	Raja	
1975	Ippadiyum Oru Penn		
1975	Melnaattu Marumagal	Mohan	
1975	Thangathile Vairam	Ravi	
1975	Yarukkum Vetkam Illai		
1975	Pattikkaattu Raja	Annasamy / Raja	
1975	Uravu Solla Oruvan	Bhaskar	Guest Appearance
1975	Aan Pillai Singam	Ashok	
1976	Madhana Maaligai	Thyagu / Raja	
1976	Gruhapravesam	Ravi	
1976	Ungalil Oruthi	Sridhar	
1976	Annakili	Thyagarajan	Nominated, Filmfare Award for Best Actor – Tamil
1976	Santhathi		
1976	Uravadum Nenjam		
1976	Bhadrakali	Ganesh	
1977	Sonnathai Seiven		
1977	Kavikkuyil	Gopal	
1977	Etharkkum Thuninthavan	Kannan	
1977	Sorgam Naragam	Shankar	
1977	Thunai Iruppal Meenakshi		
1977	Bhuvana Oru Kelvi Kuri	Nagarajan	
1977	Sri Krishna Leela	Vishnu / Krishna	
1977	Aattukara Alamelu	Vijay	Nominated, Filmfare Award for Best Actor – Tamil
1977	Pennai Solli Kutramillai	Madhu	
1977	Durga Devi		
1977	Perumaikkuriyaval	Bhaskar	
1977	Sainthadamma Sainthadu	Thenna	
1978	Maariyamman Thiruvizha	Chinna Thambi	
1978	Machanai Paatheengala	Muthaiya	
1978	Kai Pidithaval		
1978	Chittu Kuruvi	Raja / Ganesh	
1978	Radhai Ketra Kannan	Kamala Kannan	
1978	Adhaivida Ragasiyam	Kandasamy	
1978	Kannan Oru Kai Kuzhandhai	Kannan	
1978	Kannamoochi	Prabhu	
1979	Muthal Iravu	Raja	
1979	Enippadigal	Manickam	
1979	Rosappu Ravikkaikari	Sembattayan	100th Film; Winner, Filmfare Award for Best Actor – Tamil
1979	Poonthalir	Ashok	
1979	Ennadi Meenakshi		
1979	Devathai	Kaali	
1979	Kadavul Amaitha Medai	Boopathy	
1979	Yarukku Yar Kaaval		
1980	Oru Velladu Vengaiyagiradhu		
1980	Avan Aval Adhu	Ramu	Winner, Tamil Nadu State Film Award for Best Actor
1980	Kaadhal Kiligal	Vasanth	
1980	Samanthipoo	Chidambaram	
1980	Vandichakkaram	Gaja	Winner, Filmfare Award for Best Actor – Tamil
1980	Raman Parasuraman	Ram / Parasuraman	Dual Role
1980	Kuruvikoodu		
1980	Thunive Thozhan	Chandran	
1981	Neruppile Pootha Malar	Lawrence	
1981	Aani Ver	Raman	
1981	Kodeeswaran Magal	Mohan	
1981	Nellikani		
1981	Andru Muthal Indru Varai	Nathesan	
1982	Thunaivi	Sundaram	
1982	Ananda Ragam	Muthu	
1982	Ayiram Muthangal	Murali	
1982	Nambinal Nambungal		
1982	Thaai Mookaambikai	Senthil	
1982	Theerpugal Thiruththapadalam	Rajesh	
1982	Agni Sakshi	Aravindhan	Winner, Tamil Nadu State Film Award for Best Actor; Nominated, Filmfare Award for Best Actor – Tamil
1982	Nijangal		
1983	Urangatha Ninaivugal	Rishi	
1983	Saattai Illatha Pambaram	Palanisamy	
1983	Veetula Raman Veliyila Krishnan	Rajasekar	
1983	Sashti Viratham	Senthil	
1983	Indru Nee Naalai Naan	Pazhaniappan	
1983	Thandikkappatta Nyayangal	Prabhu	
1983	Thangaikkor Geetham	Harichandran	
1983	Thambathigal	Thyagu	
1984	Kuva Kuva Vaathugal	Azhagu	
1984	Amma Irukka	Ramu	
1984	Naan Paadum Paadal	C.R. Subramaniam	
1984	Nilavu Suduvathillai	Ravi	
1984	Unnai Naan Santhithen	Raghuraman	
1985	Pournami Alaigal	Rajesh	
1985	Pudhu Yugam	Rajasekar	
1985	Sugamana Raagangal	Kaalikkan	
1985	Karpoora Deepam	Arun	
1985	Meendum Parasakthi	Vijay	
1985	Prema Paasam		
1985	Sindhu Bhairavi	J. K. Balaganapathy	Nominated, Filmfare Award for Best Actor – Tamil
1986	Kanmaniye Pesu	Chandrasekhar	
1986	Jeevanathi	Gopi	
1986	Kanna Thorakkanum Saami	Sekhar	
1986	Yaaro Ezhuthiya Kavithai	Dr. Sivaraman	
1986	Isai Paadum Thendral	Mohan	
1986	Manithanin Marupakkam	Ravi Varma	
1986	Unakkaagave Vaazhgiren	Ravishankar	
1986	Panneer Nadhigal	Rajesh	
1987	Ini Oru Sudhanthiram	Sathyamoorthy	
1987	Chinna Kuyil Paaduthu	Raja	
1988	Poovum Puyalum	Muthulingam	
1988	Illam	Mayilsamy Goundar	
1988	Oruvar Vaazhum Aalayam	Siva Gurunathan	
1988	Paasa Paravaigal	Dr. Sukumar	
1988	Paadatha Thenikkal	Sathy	
1990	Pagalil Pournami	DSP Rajasekar	
1990	Nyayangal Jayikkattum	Sathyabharathi / Muthuvelu	
1990	Urudhi Mozhi	Dr. Chandrasekar	
1990	Nee Sirithaal Deepavali		
1991	Sir... I Love You	Arun	
1991	Marupakkam	Vembu Iyer	
1991	Manitha Jaathi		
1991	Pillai Paasam		
1992	Annan Ennada Thambi Ennada	Rakkaiya Gounder	
1992	Sathyam Adhu Nichayam	Sathyamoorthy	
1992	Onna Irukka Kathukanum	Sivaraman	
1993	Dasarathan	Dasarathan's father	
1993	Ponnumani	Kathirvelu	
1993	Porantha Veeda Puguntha Veeda	Ravi	
1994	Siragadikka Aasai	Shiva	
1994	Veettai Paaru Naattai Paaru	Palanivel	
1994	Mettupatti Mirasu	Mettupatti Mirasu / Siva	
1994	Watchman Vadivel	Vadivelu	
1995	Deva	Gandhidasan	
1995	Pasumpon	Kathiresathevar	
1995	Dear Son Maruthu	Viswanathan	
1996	Nattupura Pattu	Palanisamy	
1997	Sakthi	Dharmaraj	
1997	Raman Abdullah	Hajiar	
1997	Kadhalukku Mariyadhai	Rajasekhar	
1999	Unnai Thedi	Adhi Narayanan	
1999	Kummi Paattu	Dharmaraasu	
1999	Malabar Police	Nagarajan	
1999	Maravathe Kanmaniye	Dharmaraasu	
1999	Sethu	Vasudevan	
1999	Kannupada Poguthaiya	Paramasivam	
2000	Ilaiyavan	T. Babu	
2000	Uyirile Kalanthathu	Inspector Sethu Vinayagam	
2001	Poovellam Un Vaasam	Arunachalam	

=== Television ===
- Ethanai Manidhargal (1997)
- Dhik Dhik Dhik (1999)
- Kaveri (1999–2001)
- Chithi (1999–2001) as Ramachandran
- Annamalai (2002–2005) as Thavasi

=== Writer ===
- Herova? Zerova? (2008; Short film)

== Awards ==
Sivakumar is a three-time recipient of Filmfare Awards South and a two-time winner of Tamil Nadu State Film Awards.

Filmfare Awards South

- 1979 – Best Actor – Tamil for Rosaappo Ravikkai Kaari
- 1980 – Best Actor – Tamil for Vandichakkaram
- 2007 – Filmfare Lifetime Achievement Award

Tamil Nadu State Film Awards

- 1979 – Best Actor Award for Avan aval adhu
- 1982 – Best Actor Award for Agni Sakshi

South Indian International Movie Awards

- 2025 – The Exemplary Lifetime Achievement Award

Anna Centenary Library

- 2012 – Lifetime Achievement Award

Norway Tamil Film Festival Awards

- 2015 – Norway Tamil Film Festival Kalaichigaram Award

Vijay Awards

- 2018 – Vijay Award for Contribution to Tamil Cinema
