= Savitri filmography =

Savitri was one of the leading Indian actress of the 1950s and 1960s. She ranked as the leading lady of the South Indian Film Industry for more than a decade and acted in 138 Telugu films; 100 Tamil films; 6 Kannada films; 5 Hindi films and 3 Malayalam films making a total of 252 films spending 30 years in the cinema industry. She died at the age of 47.

== Filmography ==
=== Released films ===
Savitri Filmography
| Year | Title | Role | Language | Notes | Ref. |
|---|---|---|---|---|---|
| 1951 | Pathala Bhairavi | as a dancer in a dance sequence | Telugu; Tamil | Uncredited; Song "Raanante Raane Ranu" (Telugu) / "Naan Maataen Neeyum" (Tamil) | |
| 1951 | Roopavati | Vampa Kokila | Telugu | | |
| 1952 | Aadarsaam | | Telugu | | |
| 1952 | Pelli Chesi Choodu | Savitri | Telugu | First Telugu film for Savitri to appear as a lead role | |
| 1952 | Kalyanam Panni Paar | Savitri | Tamil | First Tamil film for Savitri to appear as a lead role and first film for Savitri to appear in color sequence. | |
| 1952 | Palletooru | Suguna | Telugu | | |
| 1952 | Priyuraalu | | Telugu | | |
| 1952 | Santhi | | Telugu | | |
| 1952 | Sankranthi | | Telugu | | |
| 1953 | Manam Pola Mangalyam | Kalyani | Tamil | | |
| 1953 | Devadasu | Parvathi | Telugu | | |
| 1953 | Devadas | Parvathi | Tamil | | |
| 1953 | Parobakaram / Paropakaram | | Tamil; Telugu | | |
| 1953 | Vanjam | | Tamil | | |
| 1953 | Pratigna | | Telugu | | |
| 1953 | Bratuku Teruvu | Meena | Telugu | | |
| 1953 | Bale Raman | Meena | Tamil | | |
| 1953 | Pempudu Koduku | | Telugu | | |
| 1954 | Kodarikam | | Telugu | | |
| 1954 | Sugam Enge | Veni | Tamil | | |
| 1954 | Chandraharam | Seeta | Telugu; Tamil | | |
| 1954 | Menarikam | | Telugu | | |
| 1954 | Jyothi | | Telugu | | |
| 1954 | Kudumbam | | Tamil | | |
| 1954 | Parivartana | Sundaramma | Telugu | Dubbed in Tamil as Latchathipathi | |
| 1954 | Bahut Din Huye | Mohini | Hindi | Savithri's first Hindi film | |
| 1955 | Missamma / Missiamma | Mary, Mahalakshmi | Telugu; Tamil | | |
| 1955 | Gomathiyin Kaadhalan | Gomathi | Tamil | | |
| 1955 | Donga Ramudu | Seetha | Telugu | Remade in Tamil as Thiruttu Raaman | |
| 1955 | Santhanam | Sharada | Telugu; Tamil | | |
| 1955 | Guna Sundari | Heroine | Tamil | | |
| 1955 | Chella Pillai | Lalitha | Tamil | Simultaneously made in Telugu as Vadina | |
| 1955 | Vadina | Lalitha | Telugu | | |
| 1955 | Maheshwari | Maheswari | Tamil | | |
| 1955 | Ardhangi | Padma | Telugu | The film won "Certificate of Merit" | |
| 1955 | Kanyashulkam | Madhuravani | Telugu | Based on play by Gurazada Apparao | |
| 1955 | Maaman Magal | Malathy | Tamil | | |
| 1956 | Amara Deepam | Aruna | Tamil | Dubbed in Telugu as Amarajeevi | |
| 1956 | Pennin Perumai | Padma | Tamil | Remake of Ardhangi | |
| 1956 | Mathar Kula Manickam | Lakshmi | Tamil | Simultaneously made in Telugu as Charana Daasi | |
| 1956 | Bhale Ramudu | Roopa | Telugu | | |
| 1956 | Charana Daasi | Lakshmi | Telugu | | |
| 1956 | Prema Pasam | Prema | Tamil | Simultaneously made in Telugu as Bhale Ramudu | |
| 1957 | Mayabazar | Sasirekha, Vatsala | Telugu; Tamil | Dubbed in Kannada (1960) | |
| 1957 | Vanangamudi | Devasundari | Tamil | | |
| 1957 | Kudumba Gouravam / Kutumba Gowravam | Satya | Tamil; Telugu | | |
| 1957 | Enga Veetu Mahalakshmi | Susheela | Tamil | | |
| 1957 | Karpukkarasi | Manjula | Tamil | | |
| 1957 | Yaar Paiyan | Latha | Tamil | Dubbed into Telugu as Evari Abbaayi | |
| 1957 | Soubhagyavathi | Gowri | Tamil | | |
| 1957 | Mahadhevi | Mahadevi | Tamil | | |
| 1957 | Iru Sagodharigal | Saroja | Tamil | Made simultaneously in Telugu as Bhale Ammayilu | |
| 1957 | Todi Kodallu | Susheela | Telugu | | |
| 1957 | Bhale Ammayilu | Saroja | Telugu | | |
| 1957 | M.L.A. | Nirmala | Telugu | | |
| 1957 | Pathini Deivam | | Tamil | | |
| 1958 | Mangalya Balam | Saroja | Telugu | | |
| 1958 | Karthavarayuni Katha | Aryamala | Telugu | | |
| 1958 | Inti Guttu | Shoba | Telugu | | |
| 1958 | Appu Chesi Pappu Koodu | Manjari | Telugu | | |
| 1958 | Alludu Chesina Alluri | | Telugu | | |
| 1958 | Kadan Vaangi Kalyaanam | Manjula | Tamil | | |
| 1958 | Annaiyin Aanai | | Tamil | | |
| 1958 | Kaathavaraayan | Aryamala | Tamil | | |
| 1958 | Pathi Bakthi | Alli / Bhagyam | Tamil | | |
| 1958 | Athisaya Thirudan | Gowri | Tamil | | |
| 1958 | Thirumanam | Vani | Tamil | | |
| 1958 | Manamalai | | Tamil | | |
| 1959 | Manjal Mahimai | Saroja | Tamil | | |
| 1959 | Paanai Pidithaval Bhaagyasaali | Meena | Tamil | | |
| 1959 | Bhagya Devathai | | Tamil | | |
| 1959 | Bhagya Devatha | Sarala | Telugu | | |
| 1959 | Banda Ramudu | Gowri | Telugu | | |
| 1960 | Kalathur Kannamma | Kannamma | Tamil | Dubbed in Telugu as Maavoori Ammaayi | |
| 1960 | Puthiya Pathai | | Tamil | | |
| 1960 | Pattaliyin Vetri | | Tamil | | |
| 1960 | Kuravanji | Kuravanji | Tamil | | |
| 1960 | Chivaraku Migiledi | Padma | Telugu | | |
| 1960 | Kumkuma Rekha | | Telugu | Remake of Puthiya Pathai | |
| 1960 | Nammina Bantu | Lakshmi | Telugu | Simultaneously in Tamil as Pattaliyin Vetri | |
| 1960 | Sri Venkateswara Mahatyam | Goddess Padmavathi | Telugu | | |
| 1960 | Vimala | Vimala / Lalitha | Telugu | Dual role | |
| 1960 | Abhimaanam | Radha | Telugu | | |
| 1960 | Maamaku Takka Alludu | | Telugu | | |
| 1960 | Deepavali | Satyabhama | Telugu | | |
| 1961 | Velugu Needalu | Suguna | Telugu | | |
| 1961 | Kalasi Vunte Kaladu Sukham | Radha | Telugu | | |
| 1961 | Pasamalar | Radha | Tamil | | |
| 1961 | Paava Mannippu | Thangam | Tamil | Dubbed in Telugu as Paapaparihaaram | |
| 1961 | Kappalottiya Thamizhan | Kannamma | Tamil | | |
| 1961 | Anbu Magan | | Tamil | Remake of Maa Babu | |
| 1961 | Thooya Ullam | Suguna | Tamil | | |
| 1961 | Ellam Unakkaga | Sarala | Tamil | Dubbed in Telugu as Mamakaaram | |
| 1962 | Manithan Maravillai | Lakshmi | Tamil | Remake of Gundamma Katha | |
| 1962 | Kathirunda Kangal | Lalitha / Shanmugam | Tamil | Dual Role | |
| 1962 | Konjum Salangai | Shantha | Tamil | 100th film; first full-length color film | |
| 1962 | Gundama Katha | Lakshmi | Telugu | | |
| 1962 | Bandha Pasam | Poongudi | Tamil | First credited as Nadigaiyar Thilagam | |
| 1962 | Paarthaal Pasi Theerum | Indróma / Indhra | Tamil | Dual Role | |
| 1962 | Vadivukku Valai Kappu | Vadivu | Tamil | | |
| 1962 | Paadha Kaanikkai | Malathy | Tamil | | |
| 1962 | Padithaal Mattum Podhuma | Seetha | Tamil | | |
| 1962 | Aradhana | Anuradha | Telugu | | |
| 1962 | Manchi Manasulu | Shanthi | Telugu | | |
| 1962 | Siri Sampadalu | Padma | Telugu | | |
| 1962 | Rakta Sambandham | Radha | Telugu | Remake of Pasamalar | |
| 1963 | Thobuttuvulu | Parvathi | Telugu | | |
| 1963 | Chaduvukunna Ammayilu | Sujatha | Telugu | | |
| 1963 | Narthanasala | Draupadi | Telugu | | |
| 1963 | Ratha Thilagam | Kamala | Tamil | | |
| 1963 | Parisu | Ponni | Tamil | | |
| 1963 | Karpagam | Amudha | Tamil | | |
| 1963 | Ghar Basake Dekho | Geetha | Hindi | | |
| 1964 | Karnan | Bhanumathi | Tamil | | |
| 1964 | Vettaikkaaran | Latha | Tamil | | |
| 1964 | Navarathri | Nalina | Tamil | | |
| 1964 | Kai Kodutha Deivam | Kokila | Tamil | | |
| 1964 | Aayiram Roobai | | Tamil | | |
| 1964 | Pooja Phalam | Seetha | Telugu | | |
| 1964 | Mooga Manasulu | Radha | Telugu | | |
| 1964 | Doctor Chakravarthy | Madhavi | Telugu | | |
| 1964 | Ganga Ki Lahren | Seema | Hindi | | |
| 1965 | Thiruvilaiyadal | Goddess Paarvathi | Tamil | | |
| 1965 | Hello Mister Zamindar | Radha | Tamil | | |
| 1965 | Vallavanukku Vallavan | Herself | Tamil | Guest appearance | |
| 1965 | Poojaikku Vantha Malar | Chitra | Tamil | | |
| 1965 | Sumangali | Sharada | Telugu | | |
| 1965 | Naadi Aada Janme | Kalyani | Telugu | | |
| 1965 | Pandava Vanavasam | Draupadi | Telugu | | |
| 1965 | Devata | Seetha / Lalitha | Telugu | Dual Role | |
| 1965 | Manushulu Mamathalu | Radha | Telugu | | |
| 1965 | Monagallaku Monagadu | Herself | Telugu | Guest appearance | |
| 1966 | Navaratri | Radha | Telugu | Remake of Tamil film | |
| 1966 | Bhakta Potana | Goddess Saraswathi | Telugu | | |
| 1966 | Manase Mandiram | Seetha | Telugu | | |
| 1966 | Thattungal Thirakkappadum | | Tamil | | |
| 1966 | Saraswathi Sabatham | Goddess Saraswathi | Tamil | | |
| 1966 | Annavin Aasai | Seetha | Tamil | | |
| 1966 | Kandan Karunai | Goddess Parvathi | Tamil | | |
| 1966 | Thiruvarutchelvar | Arulmozhi | Tamil | | |
| 1967 | Nirdoshi | Kamala | Telugu | | |
| 1967 | Seetha | Seetha | Tamil | | |
| 1967 | Kanchu Kota | Madhavi | Telugu | | |
| 1967 | Ummadi Kutumbam | Rama | Telugu | | |
| 1967 | Prana Mithrulu | Parvathi | Telugu | | |
| 1967 | Sati Sumathi | Goddess Parvathi | Telugu | Guest appearance | |
| 1968 | Jeevithalu | | Telugu | | |
| 1968 | Moogajeevulu | | Telugu | | |
| 1968 | Thalli Prema | Seetha | Telugu | | |
| 1968 | Chinnari Papalu | Doctor | Telugu | Directorial debut | |
| 1968 | Bandhavyalu | | Telugu | | |
| 1968 | Balram Shri Krishna | | Hindi | | |
| 1969 | Kuzhanthai Ullam | | Tamil | Also director/producer | |
| 1969 | Manasatchi | Guest appearance | Tamil | | |
| 1969 | Chiranjeevi | | Telugu | | |
| 1969 | Varakatnam | Subhadra | Telugu | | |
| 1969 | Vichitra Kutumbam | Kamala | Telugu | | |
| 1969 | Mathru Devata | Lakshmi | Telugu | | |
| 1970 | Maro Prapancham | Sarada | Telugu | | |
| 1970 | Pettandarulu | Lakshmi | Telugu | | |
| 1970 | Thalli Thandrulu | | Telugu | | |
| 1970 | Kodalu Diddina Kapuram | Lakshmi | Telugu | | |
| 1971 | Nindu Dampathulu | Sridevi | Telugu | | |
| 1971 | Vintha Samsaram | Savitri | Telugu | | |
| 1971 | Vichithra Dampathyam | | Telugu | | |
| 1971 | Talli Kootullu | | Telugu | | |
| 1971 | Praptham | Radha | Tamil | | |
| 1971 | Thirudaatha Thirudan | | Tamil | Dubbed into Telugu as Errakota Veerudu | |
| 1972 | Thaikku Oru Pillai | | Tamil | Last Tamil film in lead role | |
| 1972 | Puguntha Veedu | | Tamil | Remake of Puttinillu Mettinillu | |
| 1972 | Amma Mata | | Telugu | | |
| 1972 | Kanna Talli | | Telugu | | |
| 1972 | Sabhash Papanna | | Telugu | | |
| 1972 | Sabhash Bebi | | Telugu | | |
| 1973 | Errakota Veerudu | | Telugu | | |
| 1973 | Poolmala | | Telugu | | |
| 1973 | Desoddharakulu | Lakshmi | Telugu | | |
| 1973 | Ramarajyam | | Telugu | | |
| 1973 | Puttinillu Mettinillu | Ravi's mother | Telugu | | |
| 1973 | Jyothi Lakshmi | | Telugu | | |
| 1973 | Suryakanthi | Sivakami | Tamil | | |
| 1973 | Veetu Mappillai | | Tamil | | |
| 1973 | Jakkamma | Jakkamma | Tamil | | |
| 1973 | Manjal Kungumam | | Tamil | | |
| 1973 | Petha Manam Pithu | Meenakshi | Tamil | | |
| 1973 | Engal Thaai | | Tamil | | |
| 1973 | Chuzhi | Elizabeth | Malayalam | Savithri's first Malayalam film | |
| 1974 | Akkarapachai | | Tamil | | |
| 1974 | Baghdad Perazhagi | Queen Khadija | Tamil | | |
| 1974 | Anaganaga Oka Thandri | | Telugu | | |
| 1974 | Mugguru Ammailu | | Telugu | | |
| 1974 | Jeevitha Rangamu | | Telugu | | |
| 1974 | Bandhalu Anubandhalu | | Telugu | | |
| 1974 | Gali Patalu | | Telugu | | |
| 1974 | Thulasi | | Telugu | | |
| 1974 | Manushulu Mattibommalu | | Telugu | | |
| 1974 | Adambaralu Anubandhalu | | Telugu | | |
| 1975 | Maa Inti Devudu | | Telugu | | |
| 1975 | Vaikuntapaali | | Telugu | | |
| 1975 | Cinema Vaibhavam | | Telugu | | |
| 1975 | Kavitha | | Telugu | | |
| 1975 | Pellikanitandri | | Telugu | | |
| 1975 | Pooja | Sitamma | Telugu | | |
| 1975 | Teerpu | | Telugu | | |
| 1975 | Bharatamlo Oka Ammayayi | | Telugu | | |
| 1975 | Santhanam-Sowbhagyam | | Telugu | | |
| 1975 | Andharangam | Malliga | Tamil | | |
| 1975 | Puthu Vellam | | Tamil | | |
| 1975 | Devaru Kotta Vara | | Kannada | First Kannada film | |
| 1976 | Punitha Anthoniyar | | Tamil | | |
| 1977 | Chillara Devullu | | Telugu | | |
| 1977 | Panchayathi | | Telugu | | |
| 1977 | Unnai Suttrum Ulagam | Dhanabakiyam | Tamil | | |
| 1978 | Amara Prema | | Telugu | | |
| 1978 | Allari Pillalu | | Telugu | | |
| 1978 | Rowdy Rangamma | | Telugu | | |
| 1978 | Devadasu Malli Puttadu | | Telugu | | |
| 1978 | Mugguru Muggure | Parvathi | Telugu | | |
| 1978 | Jaganmohini | | Telugu | | |
| 1978 | Sivaranjani | Herself | Telugu | Guest appearance | |
| 1978 | Vattathukkul Chaduram | Guest appearance | Tamil | | |
| 1978 | Thayige Thakka Maga | Vishaalaakshi | Kannada | | |
| 1978 | Ashwathama | | Kannada | | |
| 1978 | Ashwadhamavu | | Malayalam | | |
| 1978 | Antonyes Punnyavalan | | Malayalam | | |
| 1979 | Allaudinaum Arputha Vilakkum | Fathima | Tamil | | |
| 1979 | Amar Deep | Mother | Hindi | | |
| 1979 | Naa Illu-Naa Vaallu | | Telugu | | |
| 1979 | Punaadiraallu | Anasuya | Telugu | | |
| 1979 | Allari Pillalu | | Telugu | | |
| 1979 | Rangoon Rowdy | Deepa's mother | Telugu | | |
| 1979 | Chandanada Gombe | Sita | Kannada | | |
| 1979 | Gorintaku | | Telugu | | |
| 1980 | Circus Ramudu | Janaki Devi | Telugu | | |
| 1980 | Ramayanamlo Pidakala Veta | | Telugu | | |
| 1980 | Sujatha | | Telugu | | |
| 1980 | Prema Tarangalu | | Telugu | | |
| 1980 | Natchathiram | Herself | Tamil | Guest appearance | |
| 1980 | Ravichandra | Mother | Kannada | | |
| 1980 | Harischandrudu | | Telugu | | |
| 1981 | Devudu Maavayya | | Telugu | | |
| 1981 | Aval Oru Kaaviyam | | Tamil | | |
| 1983 | Azhagu | | Tamil | | |

=== Unreleased and unfinished films ===
- Naai Vandhi Chennappa (Tamil) (1966)
- Maadi Veettu Ezhai (Tamil) (1969)
