= Nandi Awards of 1968 =

Indian Telugu film and TV awards ceremony

The Nandi Awards were presented annually by the Government of Andhra Pradesh to recognise excellence in Telugu cinema, theatre, and television. The first awards were presented in 1964. The following films won awards in 1968.

== 1968 Nandi Awards Winners List ==
Category	Winner	Film
Best Feature Film	S. V. Ranga Rao	Bandhavyalu
Second Best Feature Film	Savitri	Chinnari Papalu
Third Best Feature Film	C. S. Rao	Bangaru Gajulu
