= Sowcar Janaki =

Indian actress (1931–2026)

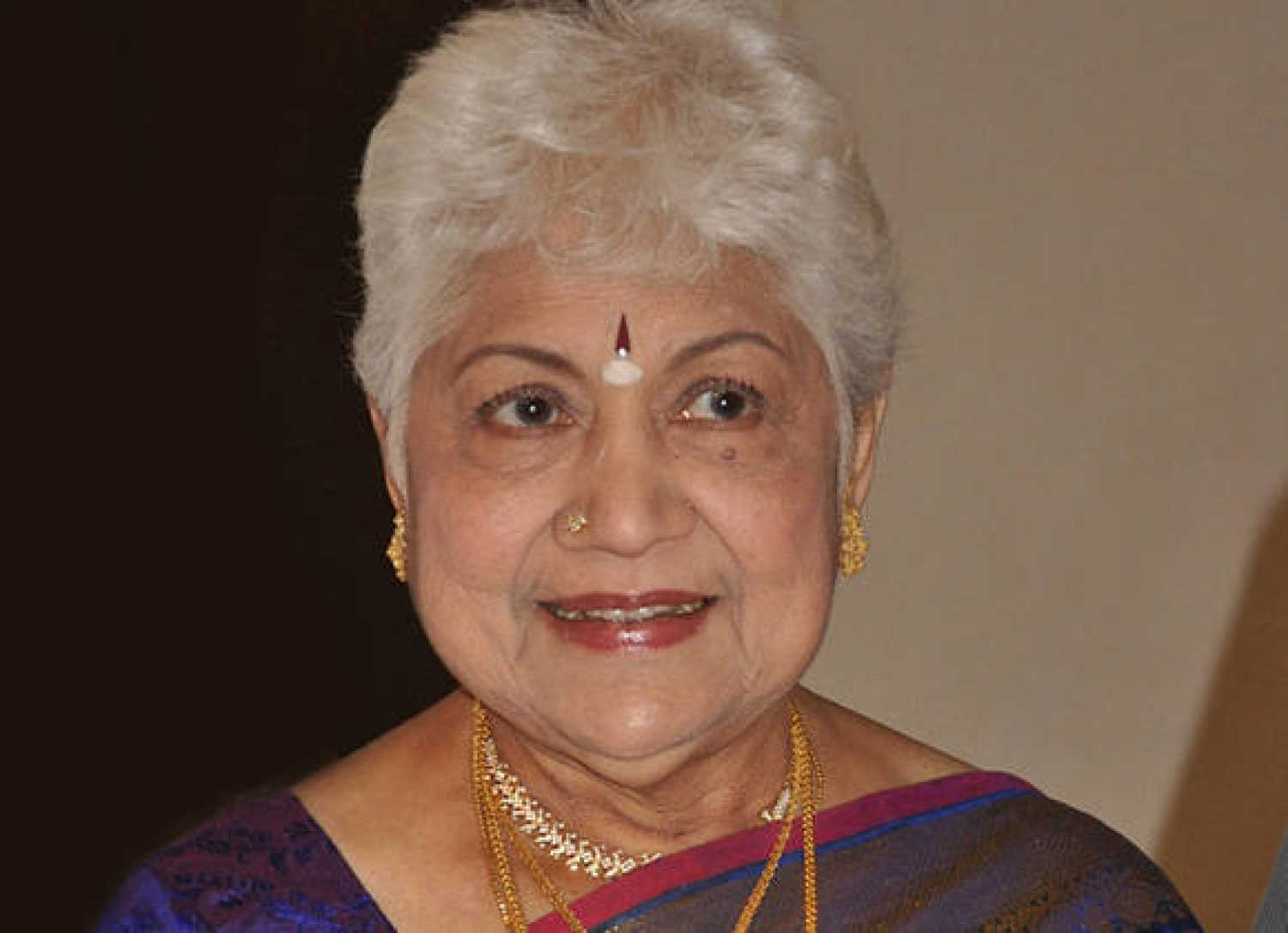
- Born: Tekumalla Janaki; 12 December 1931; Rajahmundry, East Godavari district, Madras Presidency, British India (now in Andhra Pradesh, India)
- Died: 21 August 2026 (aged 94); Chennai, Tamil Nadu, India
- Occupation: Actress
- Years active: 1949–2023
- Spouse: Sankaramanchi Srinivasa Rao (m. 1947)
- Children: 3
- Relatives: Vaishnavi Aravind (granddaughter)
- Family: Krishna Kumari (sister)
- Awards: Kalaimamani (1969); Karnataka Rajyotsava Award (2015); Padma Shri (2022)

Sankaramanchi Janaki (née Tekumalla Janaki; 12 December 1931 – 21 August 2026), known professionally as Sowcar Janaki, was an Indian actress and film producer known for her works in Telugu, Tamil and Kannada films besides a few Malayalam and Hindi films. In a career spanning over seven decades, Janaki appeared in nearly 400 films. Janaki was the recipient of several accolades, including two Nandi Awards, a Tamil Nadu State Film Award, a Kalaimamani, Karnataka Rajyotsava Award, Filmfare Lifetime Achievement Award - South and SIIMA Lifetime Achievement Award for her outstanding contributions to South Indian cinema. In 2022, Janaki was honored with the Padma Shri, the country's fourth-highest civilian award. Beyond films, Janaki was also a theatre artist who appeared in stage productions, including three K. Balachander written plays that ran for over 300 shows.. She also worked as an A-grade artist at All India Radio's Madras station.

Janaki made her screen debut at the age of 18 in the lead role of L. V. Prasad's social drama, Shavukaru (1950), which also marked the film debut of N. T. Rama Rao. The commercial success of the film led to the prefix "Sowcar" becoming associated with her name. Her Tamil cinema debut came through Valayapathi in 1952.

She was featured in the first Kannada pan-Indian film Mahishasura Mardini (1959) alongside Dr. Rajkumar, making her one of the first leading pan-Indian actresses. Janaki subsequently appeared in a range of social drama films between the 1950s - 1980s period. The Tamil film Biskoth (2020) marked her 400th film to be released.

Janaki died from an age-related illness at Kauvery Hospital, Chennai, on 21 August 2026, at the age of 94.

== Early life and family ==
Janaki was born on 12 December 1931 at Rajahmundry, East Godavari district, Madras Presidency, to Tekumalla Venkoji Rao and Sachi Devi who were a Kannada-speaking Madhva Brahmin family. Her father studied Paper manufacturing and Chemical Engineering in England and was later employed in a paper-making industry at Rajahmundry. Her mother hailed from Guwahati in Assam. Her younger sister, Krishna Kumari was a well-noted actress.Janaki completed her early studies at Gauhati University in Assam and received an Honorary Doctorate from the University of Arizona.

Janaki's association with cinema began after filmmaker B. N. Reddy noticed her at an event organized by All India Radio (AIR) in Madras, where she was an A-grade artiste. At the age of 15, she was offered an opportunity by Reddy, to enter films. However, her family declined the offer with an opinion that acting was not a suitable profession for women. She was subsequently married with a match arranged by her family.

== Personal life ==
At 18, Janaki was married to Sankaramanchi Srinivasa Rao in 1947. The couple had two daughters and a son. Her granddaughter, Vaishnavi Aravind, is also an actress who appeared in several Tamil, Telugu and a few Malayalam films, starting in 1987.

== Film career ==
Janaki made her debut in the L. V. Prasad-directed Telugu film Shavukaru in 1950, which gave her the moniker ‘Sowcar’. She made her Tamil debut in 1952 with Valayapathi. She became a prominent actress with hits in different languages as the lead heroine.

Some of her notable and well-known Tamil films include Panam Paduthum Padu (1954), Annai (1962) Puthiya Paravai (1964), Neerkumizhi (1965), Mahakavi Kalidas (1966), Edhir Neechal (1968), Oli Vilakku (1968) Iru Kodugal (1969), Uyarndha Manithan (1968), Kaviya Thalaivi (1970), Ranga Rattinam (1971), Thillu Mullu (1981), Vettri Vizhaa (1989), Hey Ram (2000), among others.

Some of her notable Telugu films include Rojulu Marayi (1955), Kanyasulkam (1955), Jayam Manade (1956), Panduranga Mahatyam (1957), Doctor Chakravarty (1964), Akka Chellelu (1970), Badi Panthulu (1972), Tayaramma Bangarayya (1979), Samsaram Oka Chadarangam (1987) and Devi (1999), among others.

She participated in more than 3,000 stage plays.

Janaki received multiple state awards from Tamil Nadu and Andhra Pradesh governments (before bifurcation).

In 2020, Janaki starred in her 400th movie, Biskoth.

In 2022, she was honoured with the Padma Shri, the fourth-highest civilian award, by the Government of India.

== Trivia ==
- Multi-generational roles with Dr. Rajkumar: Janaki holds a unique distinction in Kannada cinema for her long and versatile on-screen association with Dr. Rajkumar. She initially shared the screen as his leading lady (heroine) in several notable films, including Mahishasura Mardini (1959), Gowri (1963), Navakoti Narayana (1964), Sathi Shakthi (1964), and Saaku Magalu (1963). Over her career, she transitioned through entirely different familial dynamics alongside him, subsequently playing his sister in Kanyarathna (1963), and later his mother in Thayige Thakka Maga (1978) and his final cinematic project, Shabdavedhi (2000).
- Technical milestone: She starred in Raja Malaya Simha, which is notable for being the first Eastman Color movie in Telugu cinema.
- Association with future icons in their debuts: Throughout her seven-decade career, Janaki appeared in the debut or formative early projects of several actors who later became major superstars across Indian cinema. These include N. T. Rama Rao in Shavukaru (1950), Waheeda Rehman in Rojulu Marayi (1955), Kalpana in Saaku Magalu (1963), Sridevi in Thunaivan (1969), Soundarya in Manavarali Pelli (1993), Udaykumar in Bhagyodaya (1956), Ramya_(actress) in Abhi_(2003_film) and Vijay Deverakonda in a Sathya Sai devotional television series.

== Awards ==
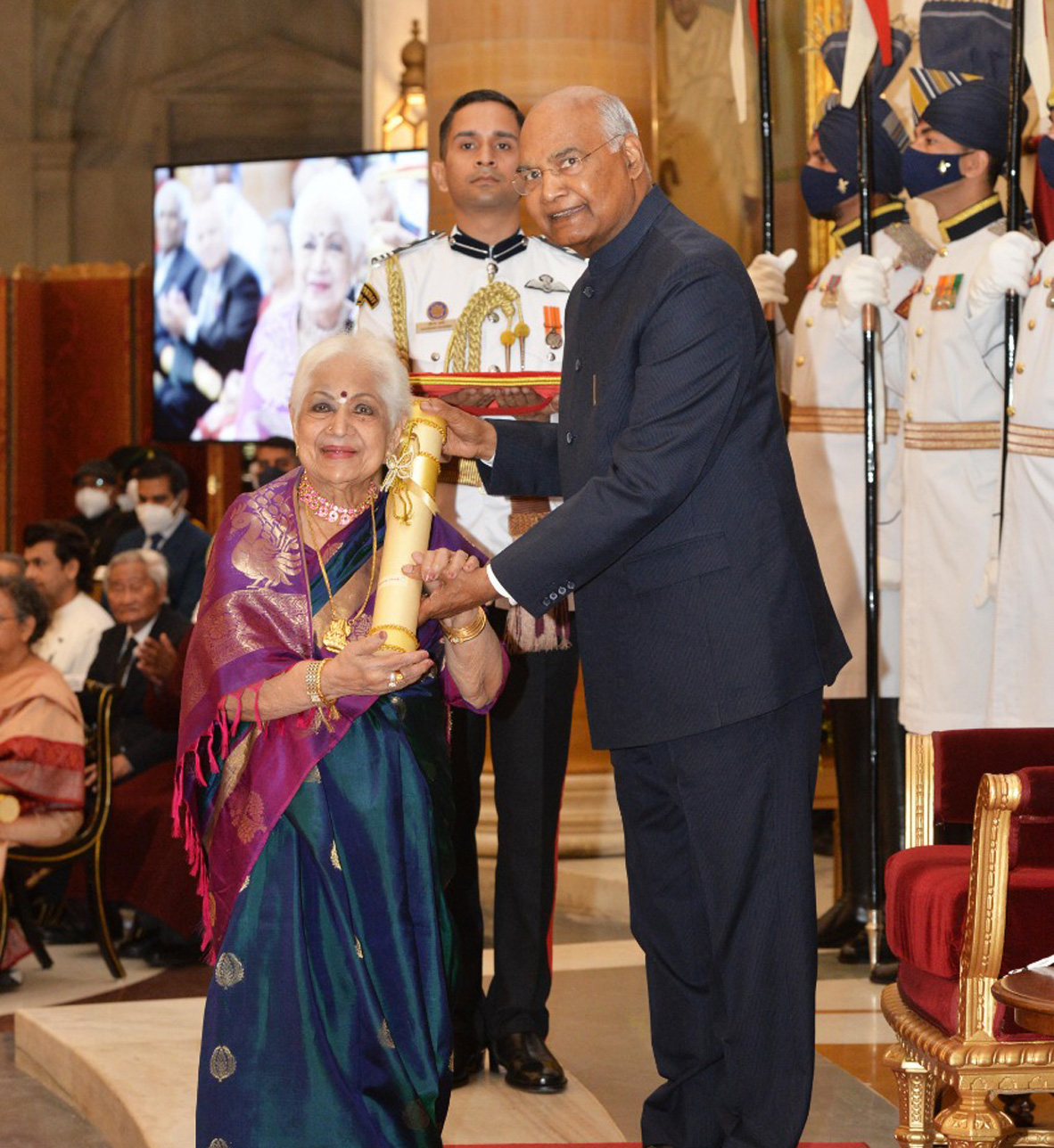
Janaki being awarded the Padma Shri, c. 2022

She has received several awards. Some notable ones are given below:

- 1969: Received title of Kalaimamani Award by the Government of Tamil Nadu, which is the highest state honour in the field of Arts
- 1970: Tamil Nadu State Film Award for Best Actress for Iru Kodugal.
- 1984: Filmfare Lifetime Achievement Award - South for Outstanding contributions to South Indian Cinema.
- 1985: Mahanati Savithri Award.
- 1985: Honorary Doctorate from World University, Arizona for excellence in her chosen field.
- 1987: Nandi Award for Best Supporting Actress for Samsaram Oka Chadarangam.
- 1989: Indian Express Dyonara Golden Award.
- 1990: Tamil Nadu State Film Honorary Award - MGR Award.
- 2000: Dr. Akkineni Nageswara Rao Lifetime Achievement Award.
- 2004: Nadigar Thilagam Sivaji Lifetime Achievement Award.
- 2007: Nandi Award for Best Supporting Actress for Amoolyam.
- 2013: SIIMA Lifetime Achievement Award.
- 2015: Rajyotsava Award by Government of Karnataka.
- 2019: Stree Ratna Award.
- 2019: Wonder Women Awards as Evergreen Entertainer of Indian Cinema.
- 2020: Puratchi Thalaivi Dr. J. Jayalalithaa Special Kalaimamani Award by the Government of Tamil Nadu.
- 2022: Padma Shri by the Government of India.
- Sri Krishna Devaraya Award in Karnataka.

== Filmography ==
Year	Film	Role	Language	Notes
1950	Shavukaru	Subbulu	Telugu	Debut film
1952	Valayapathi	Sathyavathi	Tamil	Debut Tamil film
1952	Adarsam		Telugu	
1953	Pichi Pullayya	Vasantha	Telugu	
1953	Prapancham		Telugu	
1954	Devakannika		Kannada	
1954	Panam Paduthum Padu	Saroja	Tamil	
1954	Vaddante Dabbu	Saroja	Telugu	
1955	Rojulu Marayi	Radha	Telugu	
1955	Bhagya Chakra		Kannada	
1955	Adarsha Sathi		Kannada	
1955	Kanyadhanam		Telugu	
1955	Asai Anna Arumai Thambi		Tamil	
1955	Ezhayin Aasthi		Tamil	
1955	Pasupu Kumkuma		Telugu	
1955	Cherapakura Chedevu	Lalitha	Telugu	
1955	Devakannikaa		Kannada	
1955	Kaalm Maari Pochu		Tamil	
1955	Beedhala Aasthi		Telugu	
1955	Kanyasulkam	Buchamma	Telugu	
1956	Charana Daasi	Saroja	Telugu	
1956	Sonta Ooru	Lakshmi	Telugu	
1956	Illarame Inbam		Tamil	
1956	Edi Nijam	Raami	Telugu	
1956	Sadarame		Kannada	
1956	Jayam Manade	Mallika	Telugu	
1956	Sontha Vooru	Lakshmi	Telugu	
1956	Vetri Veeran		Tamil	
1956	Sadarama		Telugu	
1956	Bhagyodaya		Kannada	
1956	Naga Devathai		Tamil	
1956	Naga Chavithi		Telugu	
1957	Bhagya Rekha	Kathyaini	Telugu	
1957	Panduranga Mahatyam	Rama's sister	Telugu	
1957	Bhale Bava		Telugu	
1957	Rathnagiri Rahasya		Kannada	
1958	School Master	Geetha	Kannada	
1958	Veettukku Vandha Varalakshmi		Tamil	
1958	Mundadugu		Telugu	
1958	Thammudu	Rani	Telugu	
1958	Ganga Gauri Samvadam		Telugu	
1958	Nalla Idathu Sammandham	Rathinam	Tamil	
1959	Kaveriyin Kanavan		Tamil	
1959	Mahishasura Mardhini	Gunavati	Kannada	
1959	Abalai Anjugam		Tamil	
1959	Madhavi		Tamil	
1959	Raja Sevai		Tamil	
1959	Raja Malaya Simham		Tamil	
1959	Raja Malaya Simha		Telugu	
1959	Thamarai Kulam		Tamil	
1959	Ulagam Sirikkirathu	Sellathayi	Tamil	
1959	Rechukka Pagatichukka	Rajakumari	Telugu	
1959	Aval Yaar	Vijaya / Ponni	Tamil	
1960	Sri Venkateswara Mahatyam	Yerukala Saani	Telugu	
1960	Kadeddulu Ekaram Nela	Seeta	Telugu	
1960	Naan Kanda Sorgam	Meenakshi	Tamil	
1960	Chavukkadi Chandrakantha		Tamil	
1960	Chinna Marumagal		Tamil	
1960	Paavai Vilakku	Gowri	Tamil	
1960	Revathi		Tamil	
1960	Padikkadha Medhai	Lakshmi	Tamil	
1961	Bhagyalakshmi	Kamala	Tamil	
1961	Kumudham	Kumudhaa	Tamil	
1961	Batasari	Shanti	Telugu	
1961	Palum Pazhamum	Nalini	Tamil	
1961	Kaanal Neer	Shanti	Tamil	
1962	Paarthaal Pasi Theerum	Janaki	Tamil	
1962	Annai	Seetha	Tamil	
1962	Daiva Leele		Kannada	
1962	Devasundari		Kannada	
1962	Manchi Manasulu	Radha	Telugu	
1962	Vadivukku Valai Kappu		Tamil	
1963	Irugu Porugu	Kanchanamala	Telugu	
1963	Anuragam		Telugu	
1963	Sathi Shakthi		Kannada	
1963	Malli Maduve		Kannada	
1963	Kanyarathna	Shantha	Kannada	
1963	Gowri		Kannada	
1963	Aasai Alaigal	Thangam	Tamil	
1963	Paar Magale Paar	Lakshmi	Tamil	
1963	Saaku Magalu	Manjula	Kannada	
1963	Pempudu Kuthuru	Manjula	Telugu	
1963	Kadavulai Kanden		Tamil	
1963	Savati Koduku	Janaki	Telugu	
1964	Puthiya Paravai	Chitra & Sarasa	Tamil	
1964	Dr. Chakravarthi	Nirmala	Telugu	
1964	Desa Drohulu	Karuna	Telugu	
1964	School Master	Johny's wife	Malayalam	
1964	Navakoti Narayana	Saraswati	Kannada	
1964	Pachai Vilakku	Parvathi	Tamil	
1964	Alli	Alli	Tamil	
1964	Peetala Meeda Pelli		Telugu	
1965	Manchi Kutumbam	Shantha	Telugu	
1965	Devata	Herself	Telugu	
1965	Naanal	Savitri	Tamil	
1965	Panam Padaithavan	Rama	Tamil	
1965	Neerkumizhi	Dr. Indra	Tamil	
1966	Motor Sundaram Pillai	Meenakshi	Tamil	
1966	Mahakavi Kalidas	Prince	Tamil	
1966	Petralthan Pillaiya	Jeeva	Tamil	
1967	Bama Vijayam	Parvathi	Tamil	
1967	Kan Kanda Daivam		Tamil	
1967	Pesum Dheivam	Guest role	Tamil	
1967	Thaikku Thalaimagan	Gauwri	Tamil	
1968	Oli Vilakku	Shanti	Tamil	
1968	Lakshmi Kalyanam	Parvathi	Tamil	
1968	Enga Oor Raja	Sivakami	Tamil	
1968	Teen Bahuraniyan	Parvati	Hindi	
1968	Jeevanaamsam	Janaki	Tamil	
1968	Ethir Neechal	Pattu	Tamil	
1968	Uyarndha Manidhan	Vimala	Tamil	
1968	Undamma Bottu Pedata		Telugu	
1968	Chakkaram	Meenakshi	Tamil	
1968	Thirumal Perumai	Kumuthavalli	Tamil	
1968	Arunodaya		Kannada	
1968	Manchi Kutumbam	Shantha	Telugu	
1968	Bhale Kodallu	Parvathi	Telugu	
1968	Chinnari Papalu	Parvathi	Telugu	
1968	Evaru Monagadu	Lakshmi	Telugu	
1968	Manassakshi	Guest appearance	Kannada	
1969	Iru Kodugal	Janaki	Tamil	
1969	Kaaval Dheivam	Alamel	Tamil	
1969	Niraparaadhi		Kannada	
1969	Akka Thangai	Janaki	Tamil	
1969	Thunaivan	Marathagam	Tamil	
1969	Kuzhandhai Ullam		Tamil	
1970	Kaaviya Thalaivi	Devi (Meera Bai) & Krishna	Tamil	Also produced the film
1970	Nadu Iravil	Rani	Tamil	
1970	Kanmalar	Vadivu	Tamil	
1970	Kasturi Thilakam	Kasturi	Tamil	
1970	Maanavan	Parvathy	Tamil	
1970	Paadhukaappu	Parvathi	Tamil	
1970	Dharma Daata	Zamindar's wife	Telugu	
1970	Akka Chellelu	Janaki	Telugu	
1970	Inti Gowravam		Telugu	
1970	Rendu Kutumbala Katha		Telugu	
1971	Babu	Parvathi	Tamil	
1971	Rangarattinam		Tamil	
1972	Thiruneelakandar	Leelavathi	Tamil	
1972	Needhi	Seetha	Tamil	
1972	Appa Tata		Tamil	
1972	Deivam	Vedhammai	Tamil	
1972	Thanga Thurai		Tamil	
1972	Badi Panthulu	Radha	Telugu	
1972	Prajanayakudu		Telugu	
1973	Pasa Dheebam		Tamil	
1973	School Master		Tamil	
1973	Khaidi Babu		Telugu	
1973	Oka Naari Vandha Thupakulu	Teacher and Narrator of the story	Telugu	
1973	Engal Thanga Raja	Seetha	Tamil	
1974	Kaliyuga Kannan	Gayatri	Tamil	
1974	Swargathil Thirumanam		Tamil	
1974	Ram Raheem	Lakshmi	Telugu	
1975	Manithanum Deivamagalam	Valli	Tamil	
1975	Cinema Paithiyam		Tamil	
1975	Pinju Manam		Tamil	
1975	Nalla Marumagal		Tamil	
1975	Uravukku Kai Koduppom		Tamil	
1975	Naaku Swatantram Vachindi		Telugu	
1975	Devudulanti Manishi		Telugu	
1975	Balipeetam		Telugu	
1975	Vemulavada Bhimakavi		Telugu	
1976	Dasavatharam	Kayadhu	Tamil	
1976	Idhaya Malar	Rajam	Tamil	
1976	Nalla Penmani		Tamil	
1976	Athirishtam Azhaikkirathu		Tamil	
1976	Perum Pukhazhum		Tamil	
1976	Ramarajyamlo Rakthapasam		Telugu	
1976	Manasakshi		Telugu	
1976	Premabandham		Telugu	
1976	Vemulawada Bheemakavi		Telugu	
1977	Olimayamana Ethirkalam		Tamil	
1978	Thayige Thakka Maga	Kumar's adopted mother	Kannada	
1978	Devadasu Malli Puttadu	Aruna's sister	Telugu	
1978	Athani Kante Ghanudu		Telugu	
1978	Anbin Alaigal		Tamil	
1978	Kannan Oru Kai Kuzhandhai		Tamil	
1978	Chal Mohana Ranga		Telugu	
1978	Iddaru Asadhyule	Janaki	Telugu	
1979	Tayaramma Bangarayya	Tayaramma	Telugu	
1979	Samajaniki Saval		Telugu	
1979	Rangoon Rowdy	Janaki	Telugu	
1979	Ravanude Ramudayithe?	Mahalakshmi	Telugu	
1979	Pattakkathi Bhairavan	Arjunan's mother	Tamil	
1980	Pappu	Herself	Malayalam	
1980	Aarada Gaaya	Judge Janaki	Kannada	
1980	Gopala Rao Gari Ammayi	Janaki	Telugu	
1981	Thee	Seetha	Tamil	
1981	Geetha	Mukta	Kannada	
1981	Kula Puthra	Guest appearance	Kannada	
1981	Prem Geet	Mrs. Laxmi Bhardwaj	Hindi	
1981	Thillu Mullu	Meenakshi Duraiswamy	Tamil	
1981	Kula Kozhunthu	Thambi Durai's mother	Tamil	
1981	Vaaralabbai		Telugu	
1981	Parvathi Parameswarulu	Parvathi	Telugu	
1981	Puli Bidda	Annapoorna	Telugu	
1981	Jagamondi	Annapoorna	Telugu	
1982	Edi Dharmam Edi Nyayam?	Lawyer	Telugu	
1982	Neethi Devan Mayakkam	Lawyer	Tamil	
1983	Bezawada Bebbuli		Telugu	
1983	Rajakumar		Telugu	
1983	Aalaya Sikharam		Telugu	
1983	Onde Guri	Kumar's mother	Kannada	
1984	Chiranjeevi		Tamil	
1984	Kode Trachu	Governess	Telugu	
1984	Kai Kodukkum Kai	Kaalimuthu's sister-in-law	Tamil	
1985	Pachani Kapuram	Malini	Telugu	
1985	Kongumudi		Telugu	
1986	Dosti Dushmani	Sumitra Singh	Hindi	
1986	Krishna Garadi	Janaki	Telugu	
1986	Aakrandana	Lawyer Janaki	Telugu	
1987	Gouthami	Sharada Devi	Telugu	
1987	Samsaram Oka Chadarangam	Chilakamma	Telugu	
1987	Majnu	Alekhya's mother	Telugu	
1987	Thayaramma Thandava Krishna		Telugu	
1987	Murali Krishnudu	Murali Krishna's grandmother	Telugu	
1987	Brahma Naidu		Telugu	
1987	Sardar Krishnamma Naidu		Telugu	
1987	Anand		Tamil	
1987	Vairagyam	Annapoorani	Tamil	
1987	Muddu Bidda		Telugu	
1988	Aadade Aadharam		Telugu	
1988	Neti Swatantram		Telugu	
1989	Thendral Puyalanadhu		Tamil	
1989	Siva	Siva's mother	Tamil	
1989	Geethanjali	Chancellor	Telugu	
1989	Pudhu Pudhu Arthangal	Goa resident	Tamil	
1989	Vetri Vizha	Shirley's aunt	Tamil	
1989	Swara Kalpana		Telugu	
1991	Azhagan	Doctor	Tamil	
1992	Soorya Manasam	Mariya	Malayalam	
1993	Manavarali Pelli	Janaki	Telugu	
1994	Madam	Sarada Devi	Telugu	
1994	Todi Kodallu		Telugu	
1997	Nenu Premisthunnanu	Rachna's mother	Telugu	
1997	Subhakankshalu	Sitaramaiah's wife	Telugu	
1998	Bavagaru Bagunnara?	Swapna's grandmother	Telugu	
1998	Kondattam	Janaki	Tamil	
1998	Thodarum	Seetha's grandmother	Tamil	
1998	Thayin Manikodi		Tamil	
1999	Devi	Vijay's grandmother	Telugu	
1999	Anbulla Kadhalukku		Tamil	
1999	Chinna Raja	Karthik's grandmother	Tamil	
1999	Ravoyi Chandamama	Sasi's grandmother	Telugu	
2000	Hey Ram	Mythili's grandmother	Tamil	
2000	Shabdavedhi	Sandeep's mother	Kannada	
2003	Ela Cheppanu	Priya's grandmother	Telugu	
2003	Abhi	Janki	Kannada	
2003	Abhimanyu	Saira Bhanu's grandmother	Telugu	
2007	Amoolyam		Telugu	
2014	Vanavarayan Vallavarayan	Krishna's & Anand's grandmother	Tamil	
2014	Pungi Daasa	Gayatri Devi	Kannada	
2015	Yevade Subramanyam	Susheela	Telugu	
2015	Kanche	Sitadevi's grandmother	Telugu	
2015	Soukhyam	Modern Bamma	Telugu	
2016	Babu Bangaram	Sailaja's grandmother	Telugu	
2019	Thambi	Parvathy and Saravanan's grandmother	Tamil	
2020	Biskoth	Janaki Paati	Tamil	400th film
2023	Anni Manchi Sakunamule	Janaki	Telugu	

=== Television ===
Year	Title	Language	Channel
1991	Oorarinda Rahasyam	Tamil	Doordarshan
1991	Penn	Tamil	Doordarshan
1995	Needa	Telugu	
1998–1999	Akshaya	Tamil	Sun TV
2001–2002	Kelunga Maamiyare Neengalum Marumagal Than	Tamil	Sun TV
2013–2014	Varudhini Parinayam	Telugu	Zee Telugu
