= Naanal (film) =

- Theatrical release poster
- Directed by: K. Balachander
- Written by: K. Balachander
- Based on: Naanal by K. Balachander
- Produced by: G. V. Saravanan
- Starring: R. Muthuraman; K. R. Vijaya; Major Sundarrajan; Sowcar Janaki; Srikanth; Nagesh
- Cinematography: P. N. Sundaram
- Edited by: N. R. Kittu; S. Muthu
- Music by: V. Kumar
- Production company: Saravana Pictures
- Release date: 24 December 1965
- Running time: 135 minutes
- Country: India
- Language: Tamil

Naanal (transl. Reed cane) is a 1965 Indian Tamil-language crime comedy film, written and directed by K. Balachander. It is based on his play of the same name. The film stars R. Muthuraman, Major Sundarrajan, Srikanth, Sowcar Janaki, K. R. Vijaya and Nagesh. It was released on 24 December 1965 and failed at the box office.

== Plot ==
Four jailbirds escape from prison to take revenge on the judge who sentenced them. They take over his house, and the film builds around the judge and his family escaping from them.

== Cast ==
- R. Muthuraman as Inspector Baskaran
- Major Sundarrajan as Prisoner Arasu
- Sowcar Janaki as Savitri
- K. R. Vijaya as Jaya, Raghunathan's sister
- Srikanth as Murali
- Nagesh as Pattabi Raman
- S. N. Lakshmi as Lakshmi
- Shoba
- K. Vijayan as Judge Raghunathan
- Gemini Mali as Prisoner David
- Hari Krishnan as Prisoner Bairavan
- I. S. R. as Kesavan
- Typist Gopu as Milk Man

== Production ==
Naanal was a play written by K. Balachander and inspired by the film The Desperate Hours (1955). After the release of Neerkumizhi (1965), Balachander decided to adapt The Desperate Hours as the story for his next play after being impressed by the plot. Naanal was later adapted by him into a film with the same name after the producer Velumani felt it had potential. Naanal marked the feature film debut of Typist Gopu.

When the film was submitted to the censor board for certification, an official raised objection against the film's concept, believing it may influence criminals in real life to take revenge in a similar manner and instructed Balachander to change the story and film it again. Balachander, who was shocked by this decision as the film was nearing its release, made changes to the film like redubbing lines of "Judge" and replacing it with "Durai" while also shooting a flashback scene to show the reason for the criminals' anger against the film's protagonist in one day and added it in the film. After making these changes, the certification was given.

== Soundtrack ==
The music was composed by V. Kumar. Historian A. R. Venkatachalapathy wrote, "[Suratha] had a knack for compiling data, making lists and turning them into poetry", citing "Vinnukku Melaadai" in Naanal as an example.

Songs	Singers	Lyricists	Length
"Ennathaan Paaduvathu"	P. Susheela	Alangudi Somu	03:59
"Kuyil Koovi Thuyil Ezhuppa"	Soolamangalam Rajalakshmi	Alangudi Somu	02:52
"Kuyil Koovi Thuyil Ezhuppa" – Sad	Soolamangalam Rajalakshmi & Major Sundarrajan (dialogues)	Alangudi Somu	03:26
"Vinnukku Melaadai"	T. M. Soundararajan & P. Susheela	Suratha	05:39

== Release and reception ==
Naanal was released on 24 December 1965. T. M. Ramachandran of Sport and Pastime positively reviewed the film, praising Sundarrajan's performance more than the other cast members. Kalki gave the film a less positive review, comparing it unfavourably to the source play. The film did not do well at the box-office.

== Legacy ==
The storyline of Crazy Mohan's play Crazy Thieves in Palavakkam was inspired by Naanal.
