= Sontha Vooru =

Sontha Vooru may refer to:

- Sontha Vooru (1956 film), a film produced by G. Sadasivudu
- Sontha Vooru (2009 film), a film directed by P. Sunil Kumar Reddy
