= Suratha =

- Born: Rasagopalan; 23 November 1921; Thanjavur, Tamil Nadu, India
- Died: 19 June 2006 (aged 84)
- Occupation: Tamil Poet

Suratha (Tamil: சுரதா) (23 November 1921 – 20 June 2006) was a Tamil poet, recognized for his poetic use of similes. He was called "Uvamai Kavignar" ("poet of comparisons").

== Early life ==
Suratha was born in Thanjavur, Tamil Nadu as T. Rajagopal on 23 November 1921. He derived his pen name from Subburathnadasan (Bharathidasan, a poet of yesteryear).

== Literary works ==
Saavin Mutham (meaning "kiss of death") and Thenmazhai (meaning "rain of honey") were among his notable works. He also ran a weekly Kaavyam, entirely dedicated to poetry.

He was also a lyricist and a dialogue writer for more than 100 Tamil films and songs such as Amuthum thenum ethatku. Another of his popular lyric was the philosophical Aadi adangum vaazhkaiyada, which was featured in the Tamil movie 'Neer Kumizhi' (Water bubble), released in 1965.

== Filmography ==
=== As writer ===
- Amarakavi (1952)

=== As lyricist ===
- Amarakavi (1952)
- En Thangai (1952)
- Anbu (1953)
- Genova (1953)
- Ammaiyappan (1954)
- Kathanayaki (1955)
- Pudhu Vazhvu (1957)
- Boologa Rambai (1958)
- Nadodi Mannan (1958)
- Thai Pirandhal Vazhi Pirakkum (1958)
- Thirumanam (1958)
- Abalai Anjugam (1959)
- Nalla Theerpu (1959)
- Thalai Koduthaan Thambi (1959)
- Aadi Perukku (1962)
- Naanal (1965)
- Neerkumizhi (1965)
- Major Chandrakanth (1966)
- Marakka Mudiyumaa? (1966)
- Netru Indru Naalai (1974)

== Awards ==
He received the Kalaimamani award in 1972 and the Bharatidasan award in 1990.
