= Sarada (1962 film) =

- Theatrical release poster
- Directed by: K. S. Gopalakrishnan
- Written by: K. S. Gopalakrishnan
- Produced by: A. L. Srinivasan
- Starring: S. S. Rajendran; C. R. Vijayakumari
- Cinematography: M. Karnan
- Edited by: R. Devarajan
- Music by: K. V. Mahadevan
- Production company: ALS Productions
- Distributed by: ALS Productions
- Release date: 16 March 1962
- Running time: 147 minutes
- Country: India
- Language: Tamil

Sarada (/sɑːrəðɑː/) is a 1962 Indian Tamil-language drama film written and directed by K. S. Gopalakrishnan in his directorial debut. The film was produced by A. L. Srinivasan under ALS Productions and stars S. S. Rajendran and C. R. Vijayakumari, while M. R. Radha, S. V. Ranga Rao and S. A. Ashokan play supporting roles. The music was composed by K. V. Mahadevan, while the lyrics for the songs were written by Kannadasan. Karnan and R. Devarajan handled cinematography and editing respectively.

Sarada was released on 16 March 1962. Srinivasan had to distribute the film himself after distributors backed out. Despite this, it became successful at the box office established Gopalakrishnan as a popular director. The film won the National Film Award for Best Feature Film in Tamil – Certificate of Merit for the Third Best Feature Film. It was remade in Hindi as Suhagan (1964), in Telugu as Sumangali (1965) and in Kannada as Sothu Geddavalu (1971).

== Cast ==
- S. S. Rajendran as Sambandham
- C. R. Vijayakumari as Sarada
- Pushpalatha as Uma
- M. R. Radha as Panchanathan
- S. V. Ranga Rao as Vaiyapuripillai
- M. V. Rajamma as Sambandham's mother
- Geetanjali as Panchanathan's third wife
- V. Nagayya as College principal
- S. V. Sahasranamam as College principal
- S. A. Ashokan as Shankar
- Karikol Raju as Panchanathan's labourer
- N. R. Sandhiya as Sarada's mother
- S. Rama Rao as Panchanathan's son

== Production ==
K. S. Gopalakrishnan—who earlier worked as a screenwriter for films like Deivapiravi and Padikkadha Medhai—made his directorial debut with Sarada. He approached A. L. Srinivasan to produce the film based on the concept of the protagonist's sexual potency. Srinivasan liked the script and agreed to produce despite being warned by friends not to produce a film with such a bold concept.

== Soundtrack ==
The soundtrack was composed by K. V. Mahadevan and lyrics were written by Kannadasan and Panchu Arunachalam. The songs "Manamagale Marumagale" and "Oruthi Oruvanai" were well received. The former is Arunachalam's first song as a lyricist.

Track listing
No.	Title	Singer(s)	Length
1.	"Manamakale Marumakale"	Soolamangalam Jayalakshmi, Soolamangalam Rajalakshmi, L. R. Eswari, Anjali	3:20
2.	"Koonthalukku"	T. M. Soundarajan	3:08
3.	"Mella Mella"	T. M. Soundarajan	3:18
4.	"Oruthi Oruvanai"	P. B. Srinivas, P. Susheela	4:12
5.	"Thattu Thadumari"	Seerkazhi Govindarajan, L. R. Eswari	3:45
6.	"Kannaanaal Naan Imaiyaaven"	T. M. Soundararajan, P. Susheela	4:23
Total length:			22:06

== Release ==
Sarada was released on 16 March 1962. Film distributors expressed their doubts over the film after watching it and sought refund of their advances. Srinivasan returned the advance and released the film on his own and became successful. The film was successful even its second release.

== Reception ==
The film was praised by critics for Gopalakrishnan's writing, the cast performances (particularly Vijayakumari's) and music. Ananda Vikatan appreciated the film stating that "the film had several interesting elements and innovations.. It is a must watch film and make us all proud that Tamil films are progressing well". Kanthan of Kalki wrote that though the film reminded him of Nenjil Or Aalayam (1962), the innovative screenplay made it worth watching. The film received National Film Award for Best Feature Film in Tamil – Certificate of Merit for the Third Best Feature Film.

== Plagiarism allegations ==
Many reviewers noted Sarada had similarities to Snehidhi, a novel by Akilan. Subsequently, he filed a lawsuit against Srinivasan, alleging plagiarism. Writer Jayalakshmi also sued Srinivasan, claiming the film plagiarised one of her short stories. However, as historian A. R. Venkatachalapathy noted, "the legal intricacies of copyright, it appears, were beyond both [Akilan]'s and his lawyer's grasp", leading to Akilan losing the case while Jayalakshmi won. She was compensated by being "awarded more damages than claimed", and the scenes she took offense to were deleted.

== Legacy ==
Sarada established Gopalakrishnan as a popular director and he went on to direct several films with the theme of family drama. It was remade in Hindi as Suhagan (1964), in Telugu as Sumangali (1965) and in Kannada as Sothu Geddavalu (1971).

== Bibliography ==
- Dhananjayan, G. (2014). Pride of Tamil Cinema: 1931–2013. Blue Ocean Publishers. OCLC 898765509.
