= Abalai Anjugam =

1959 film

- Theatrical release poster
- Directed by: R. M. Krishnaswamy
- Screenplay by: A. L. Narayanan
- Based on: Abalai Anjugam by Ki. Ra. Gopalan
- Produced by: R. M. Krishnaswamy
- Starring: T. R. Mahalingam; Sowcar Janaki; V. R. Rajagopal; T. A. Mathuram; M. N. Rajam
- Cinematography: P. Madhusoodhana Rao
- Edited by: R. M. Venugopal
- Music by: K. V. Mahadevan
- Production company: Aruna Films
- Distributed by: Parthiban Productions
- Release date: 31 October 1959
- Running time: 177 minutes
- Country: India
- Language: Tamil

Abalai Anjugam (transl. Helpless Anjugam) is a 1959 Indian Tamil-language drama film produced and directed by R. M. Krishnaswamy. The film, based on the short story of the same name by Ki. Ra. Gopalan, stars T. R. Mahalingam and Sowcar Janaki. It was released on 31 October 1959.

== Plot ==
Anjugam is a helpless young woman who is pushed into great difficulties including a charge of theft. However, she overcomes them and the story has a happy ending.

== Cast ==
Compiled from the review article in The Hindu and from the database of Film News Anandan.

Male cast

- T. R. Mahalingam
- Kuladeivam V. R. Rajagopal
- Karikol Raju
- C. S. Pandian
- Stunt Somu
- Goperaj

Female cast

- Sowcar Janaki
- Rushyendramani
- M. N. Rajam
- T. A. Mathuram
- R. M. Manorama
- Leela Bai

== Soundtrack ==
Music was composed by K. V. Mahadevan. After poet Suratha wrote the first para (Pallavi) of the song Vennilaa Kudai Pidikka differences cropped up between him and the composer. The poet refused to write the rest of the song even after any amount of coaxing by Udumalai Narayana Kavi who invited Suratha to write the song. Thereafter Udumalai Narayana Kavi wrote the completing lines of the song. However, credit was given to Suratha only in the film.

Song	Singer/s	Lyricist
"Keezhe Bhoomi, Maele Vaanam"	S. C. Krishnan, A. L. Raghavan & P. Leela	Udumalai Narayana Kavi
"Nal Vazhiye Nadandhu"	T. R. Mahalingam	Udumalai Narayana Kavi
"Pirapokkum Ellaa Uyirkum"	T. R. Mahalingam	Udumalai Narayana Kavi
"Ikkaraikku Akkarai Pachai"	T. R. Mahalingam	Thanjai Marimuthu
"Thoondil Poattu Izhutha"	T. R. Mahalingam	A. L. Narayanan
"Pazhikaara Ulagamadaa Idhu"	T. R. Mahalingam	A. Maruthakasi
"Vennilaa Kudai Pidikka"	T. R. Mahalingam & P. Susheela	Suratha & Udumalai Narayana Kavi
"Daaladikkum Paappaa Jaaliyaaga"	P. Leela	Thanjai N. Ramaiah Dass
"Adichadhu Paar Onnaam Nambar"	A. L. Raghavan & A. G. Rathnamala	Thanjai N. Ramaiah Dass
"Ilaya Kanniyin Azhagiya"	T. R. Mahalingam & S. Janaki	Kannadasan

== Reception ==
Kalki wrote that they came with great expectations, but the screenwriter squandered the good story. Film historian Randor Guy said the film performed "fairly well" at the box office.
