= Valayapathi (film) =

- Theatrical release poster
- Directed by: T. R. Sundaram; Masthan
- Written by: Bharathidasan (dialogues)
- Story by: Modern Theatres Story Dept.
- Produced by: T. R. Sundaram
- Starring: G. Muthukrishnan; Sowcar Janaki; T. A. Jayalakshmi; K. K. Perumal
- Cinematography: M. Masthan
- Edited by: L. Balu
- Music by: S. Dakshinamurthi
- Production company: Modern Theatres
- Release date: 17 October 1952
- Country: India
- Language: Tamil

Valayapathi is a 1952 Indian Tamil-language film, directed and produced by T. R. Sundaram. The film stars G. Muthukrishnan, Sowcar Janaki (in her Tamil debut), T. A. Jayalakshmi and K. K. Perumal. Based on the epic of the same name, it was released on 17 October 1952, and failed at the box-office.

== Cast ==
- G. Muthukrishnan as Valayapathi
- Sowcar Janaki as Sathyavathi
- T. A. Jayalakshmi as Andhari
- K. K. Perumal as Kanakavelalar
- A. Karunanidhi
- T. P. Muthulakshmi
- M. S. S. Bhagyam
- 'Pulimoottai’ Ramasami
- M. N. Krishnan
- M. E. Havana
- S. R. Lakshmi
- K. K. Soundar
- S. M. Thirupathisami
- C. K. Soundararajan
- K. T. Dhanalakshmi
- M. A. Ganapathi
- ‘Master’ Sudhakar
- ‘Master’ Ramakrishnan
- A. S. Mani

== Production ==
Valayapathi is based on the epic poem of the same name. Since large parts of the epic were not available, the makers had to make fictional additions. Sowcar Janaki made her Tamil debut with this film. Since she was not fluent in the language at the time, she memorised her dialogues after converting them to her native Telugu.

== Soundtrack ==
Music was composed by S. Dakshinamurthi and lyrics were penned by Bharathidasan, Kannadasan and K. D. Santhanam.

Song	Singers	Lyrics	Length
"Kulungidum Poovil Ellaam Thenaruvi"	T. M. Soundararajan & K. Jamuna Rani	Bharathidasan	03:15
"Kulir Thaamarai Malar Poigai"	T. M. Soundararajan & K. Jamuna Rani	Bharathidasan	02:57
"Alli Alli Alli"	S. C. Krishnan & K. Rani		02:25
"Ennam Pole Vaazhve"	K. Rani		02:40
"Palli Koodam Bamm Bamm"	A. L. Raghavan		02:40
"Uyar Needhiyin Jeevan"	T. M. Soundararajan		02:50

== Release and reception ==
Valayapathi was released on 17 October 1952, Diwali day. The magazine Sivaji positively reviewed the film. According to Janaki, the film failed at the box-office because it was released alongside Parasakthi which became more successful.
