= Navakoti Narayana =

- Film DVD cover
- Directed by: S. K. Ananthachari
- Screenplay by: Narendra Babu; S. K. Ananthachari
- Produced by: D. R. Naidu
- Starring: Rajkumar; Sowcar Janaki; Dikki Madhava Rao; H. R. Shastri
- Cinematography: S. V. Srikanth
- Edited by: S. P. N. Krishna; Harinarayanaiah
- Music by: Shivaprasad
- Release date: 1964
- Running time: 163 minutes
- Country: India
- Language: Kannada

Navakoti Narayana is a 1964 Indian Kannada-language film directed by S. K. Ananthachari starring Rajkumar and Sowcar Janaki. The film is based on the life of Purandara Dasa, a prominent composer of Carnatic music who lived from 1470 to 1564. Rajkumar plays the role of Purandara Dasa. The music of the film was composed by Shivaprasad. This was the second Kannada movie on the life of Purandara Dasa after the 1937 movie Purandaradasa.

== Cast ==
- Rajkumar as Purandara Dasa
- Sowcar Janaki as Saraswati, wife of Purandara Dasa
- Dikki Madhava Rao
- H.R. Shastri as Vyasatirtha
- Mala
- Radhika
- Kemparaj

== Soundtrack ==
Navakoti Narayana

Soundtrack album by Shivaprasad
- Released: 1964
- Genre: Feature film soundtrack
- Label: Saregama

The music of the film was composed by Shivaprasad.

Tracklist

#	Title	Singer(s)	Length
1	"Madhukara Vruththi"	P. Leela, P. B. Sreenivas, M. Balamuralikrishna	4:25
2	"Bangaravidabare"	P. Leela, M. Balamuralikrishna	3:36
3	"Padumanabha"	Subbanarasimhayya	2:47
4	"Dasarendare"	P. B. Sreenivas	0:39
5	"Aalaya"	M. Balamuralikrishna	1:02
6	"Aadadella Olithe"	M. Balamuralikrishna	2:59
7	"Kannare Kande"	M. Balamuralikrishna	3:20
8	"Ranga Bara"	S. Janaki, M. Balamuralikrishna	3:35
9	"Indina Dinave"	M. Balamuralikrishna	3:31
10	"Manavajanma"	M. Balamuralikrishna	2:46
11	"Achchuthananda"	M. Balamuralikrishna	2:03
12	"Sri Gananatha"	Chorus	1:58
