= Ranga Rattinam =

1971 film by Krishnan–Panju

- Poster
- Directed by: Krishnan–Panju
- Produced by: Sowcar Janaki
- Starring: Gemini Ganesan; Sowcar Janaki; Ravichandran; V. S. Raghavan
- Music by: V. Kumar
- Production company: SJ Films
- Release date: 24 December 1971
- Country: India
- Language: Tamil

Ranga Rattinam (transl. Carousel) is a 1971 Indian Tamil-language film directed by Krishnan–Panju. Produced by Sowcar Janaki, who also stars in it, the film also features Gemini Ganesan, Ravichandran and V. S. Raghavan. It was released on 24 December 1971.

== Plot ==
A girl loses her mental balance while riding a giant wheel. She grows up to become pregnant without knowing the man in her life. The man who bears the brunt of the deed faces insurmountable problems until finally the hero emerges to the relief of all concerned.

== Production ==
Ranga Rattinam was directed by the duo Krishnan–Panju, and produced by Sowcar Janaki under her company SJ Films. She also starred as the female lead, and intended for the film not to have ingredients that were deemed necessary for routine Tamil films such as "spice".

== Soundtrack ==
The soundtrack was composed by V. Kumar & Lyrics were by Vaali.

== Release and reception ==
Ranga Rattinam was released on 24 December 1971. Film World wrote, "Life is a giant wheel — a merry-go-round. This is what the director tries to say. But the way in which it is told on the screen leaves much to be desired [...] With Krishnan Panju in charge of direction, the picture should have been good, if not outstanding, but unfortunately, it refuses to rise above the average standard of Tamil films." Janaki felt the film was "much misunderstood" and "seen from a wrong context".

== Bibliography ==
- Ramachandran, T. M., ed. (1972). Film World. Vol. 8.
