= Kuzhandai Ullam =

- Theatrical release poster
- Directed by: Savitri
- Screenplay by: Savitri
- Based on: Chinnari Papalu
- Produced by: Savitri
- Starring: Gemini Ganesan; Sowcar Janaki; Vanisri
- Cinematography: Singh; Sekhar
- Edited by: M. S. N. Murthy
- Music by: S. P. Kodandapani
- Production company: Sri Savitri Productions
- Release date: 14 January 1969
- Country: India
- Language: Tamil

Kuzhandai Ullam (transl. Childish heart) is a 1969 Indian Tamil-language drama film directed, produced and written by Savitri. The film stars Gemini Ganesan, Sowcar Janaki and Vanisri. A remake of Savitri's Telugu film Chinnari Papalu (1968), it was released on 14 January 1969 and became an average success.

== Plot ==
A rich painter meets a tribal girl in a forest and falls in love with her. He finds himself married to her without knowing it, and spends a night with her. He is then forced into marrying a city girl to satisfy his mother. His emotional involvement with the tribal girl, whom he cannot erase from his memory, complicates things. Ultimately, thanks to two children, the broken hearts are united.

== Cast ==
- Gemini Ganesan
- Sowcar Janaki
- Vanisri
- R. S. Manohar
- Thengai Srinivasan
- Rama Prabha
- V. K. Ramasamy
- A. Veerappan

== Production ==
Though Savitri's Telugu film Chinnari Papalu (1968) was a box-office bomb, it received critical acclaim; this prompted her to remake it in Tamil as Kuzhandai Ullam. Savitri, in addition to directing, produced it under Sri Savitri Productions, and wrote the screenplay while M. Lakshmanan wrote the dialogues. Singh and Sekhar, the cinematographers of the original, returned in their positions, and editing was handled by M. S. N. Murthy. The film marked the debut of art director Mohana.

== Soundtrack ==
The soundtrack was composed by S. P. Kodandapani, and the lyrics were written by Kannadasan.

Track listing
No.	Title	Singer(s)	Length
1.	"Angum Ingum Ondre"	P. Susheela, Renuka
2.	"Muthu Chippikkulle"	P. Susheela, S. P. Balasubrahmanyam
3.	"Poomarathu Nizhalumundu"	P. Susheela, S. Janaki
4.	"Kudagu Naadu Ponni"	P. Susheela, Sirkazhi Govindarajan
5.	"Aathankarai Kaathukku Vayasu"	P. Susheela	3:55
6.	"O! Dharmaththin Thalaivane!"	T. M. Soundarajan	3:22

== Release and reception ==
Kuzhandai Ullam was released on 14 January 1969, during Pongal. The Indian Express wrote on 25 January, "[Savitri] has on the whole weaved a fairly appealing product though old-fashioned in style and treatment." The film was an average success.
