= S. V. Ranga Rao =

Indian actor (1918–1975)

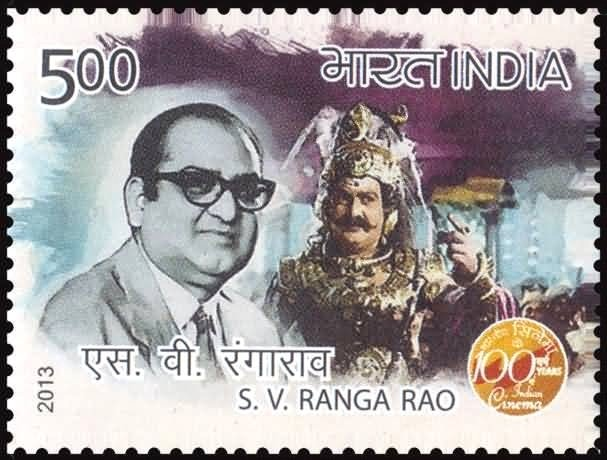
- Ranga Rao on a 2013 stamp of India
- Born: Samarla Venkata Ranga Rao; 3 July 1918; Nuziveedu, Madras Presidency, British India (now Andhra Pradesh, India)
- Died: 18 July 1974 (aged 56); Madras, Tamil Nadu, India
- Other names: SVR, Viswa Nata Chakravarthi
- Occupations: Actor; producer; director
- Spouse: Leelavathi (m. 1947)
- Relatives: Badeti Bujji (nephew); Badeti Chanti (nephew)
- Awards: Rashtrapati Award; International Honor

Samarla Venkata Ranga Rao (3 July 1918 – 18 July 1974), popularly known as S. V. Ranga Rao and SVR, was an Indian actor and filmmaker who primarily worked in Telugu and Tamil films. He is regarded as one of the finest actors in the history of Indian cinema. He is known by the epithet "Viswa Nata Chakravarthi" (transl. "Emperor of Acting Universe") and was the earliest character actor in South Indian cinema to achieve a star status. Ranga Rao garnered various national and international honours in a nearly three-decade long career.

Ranga Rao was a method actor known for his natural acting style, portraying complex social, biographical, and mythological characters. Some of his most iconic roles include 'Nepala Manthrikudu', a tantric in Pathala Bhairavi (1951), Yama in Sati Savitri (1957), Ghatothkacha in Maya Bazaar (1957), Mayasura in Bhookailas (1958), and Bhoja in Mahakavi Kalidasu (1960). In 1964, he won the Best Actor Award at the third Afro-Asian Film Festival held in Jakarta for his portrayal of Kichaka in Nartanasala (1963), becoming the only Indian actor to have ever received the honour. His other notable performances include roles as Duryodhana in Pandava Vanavasam (1965), Hiranyakasipu in Bhakta Prahlada (1967), and Ravana in Sampoorna Ramayanam (1971).

Ranga Rao's notable films as a character actor include Mana Desam (1949), Palletoori Pilla (1950), Devadasu (1953), Bangaru Papa (1954), Raju Peda (1954), Thodi Kodallu (1957), Chenchu Lakshmi (1958), Pelli Naati Pramanalu (1958), Nammina Bantu (1959), Gundamma Katha (1962), Sarada (1962), Aatma Bandhuvu (1962), Annai (1962), Karpagam (1963), Naanum Oru Penn (1963), Bobbili Yuddham (1964), Bandhavyalu (1968), Prema Nagar (1971), Dasara Bullodu (1971), Pandanti Kapuram (1972), Vasantha Maligai (1972), Thatha-Manavadu (1973), and Andaru Dongale (1974).

In his honour, the Government of Andhra Pradesh instituted the S. V. Ranga Rao Award for Best Character Actor, which is presented annually to recognize outstanding performances in character roles.

== Early life ==
Ranga Rao was born in Nuziveedu in erstwhile Krishna District of Andhra Pradesh in 1918 in a Telugu farmer family. His father, Samarla Koteswara Rao, was an excise inspector at Nuzvidu, and his mother's name was Smt. Lakshmi Narasayamma. His grandfather was working as a doctor in the town. He had relatives scattered in East Godavari district. His grandfather, Kotayya Naidu, lived in Chengalpattu, Tamil Nadu.

His mother, Lakshmi Narasayamma, a staunch devotee of Lord Venkateswara, named the boy after him. Ranga Rao was sent to Madras, where he completed his schooling at Hindu College. He also studied in Eluru and Visakhapatnam. At an early age of 12, he showed interest in stage acting. He ventured into acting after completing his bachelor's degree in sciences.

== Career ==
S. V. R. got an invitation from one of his relatives, B. V. Ramanandam, to play the lead actor in his film Varoodhini (1947). He immediately abandoned the job, and left for Salem to join the celluloid world. However, the film didn't do well at the box office.

S. V. R. left Madras Presidency and reached Jamshedpur, where he took up the job as a budget assistant with the Tata company. However, his love for theatre began to bloom multifold. At this juncture, he married Badeti Leelavathi on 27 December 1947. In the days that followed, S. V. R. was given an opportunity to appear in Palletoori Pilla (1950), produced by B. A. Subba Rao. Shavukaru (1950) earned him recognition as a fine actor.

His role as the antagonist 'Nepala Manthrikudu', a tantric in Pathala Bhairavi (1951) was a turning point in his career. The film became a breakthrough for both Ranga Rao and the lead actor N. T. Rama Rao. Pathala Bhairavi was the only south Indian film screened at the first International Film Festival of India. Ranga Rao also starred in the enduring classics Mayabazar (1957) and Nartanasala (1963), featured in the CNN-IBN's list of "100 greatest Indian films of all time".

In a career spanning nearly three decades, he acted in over 160 films —109 in Telugu and 53 in Tamil. He was one of the earliest stars to feature in commercials and his ad for the popular cigarette brand Berkeley, was extremely popular.

== Characters essayed ==
- Akbar in Anarkali
- Banasura in Usha Parinayam
- Bhishma in Bala Bharatam
- Bhoja in Mahakavi Kalidasu
- Daksha in Dakshayagnam
- Duryodhana in Pandava Vanavasam
- Ghatotkacha in Mayabazar
- Harischandra in Harischandra
- Hiranyakashipu in Bhakta Prahlada
- Kamsa in Yashoda Krishna and Srikrishna Leelalu
- Keechaka in Narthanasala
- Mayasura in Bhookailas
- Narakasura in Vinayaka Chaviti and Deepavali
- Rajaraja Narendra in Sarangadhara
- Ravana in Sampoorna Ramayanam, Veeranjaneya, and Indrajeet (Sati Sulochana)
- Tandra Paparayudu in Bobbili Yuddham
- Ugrasena in Guna Sundari
- Yama in Sati Savitri

== Personal life ==
Ranga Rao married Leelavati, daughter of Badeti Venkata Ramayya and Koteswaramma on 27 December 1947. They have three children: two daughters, Vijaya and Prameela and a son, Koteswara Rao.

Ranga Rao wanted to launch his son into films and shot a few portions. But the film didn't take off for unknown reasons. He was a pet-lover, owned two German Shepherds at his residence. Ranga Rao was a poet and also wrote short stories for a few publications and nurtured a love for cricket, painting, hunting.

== Death ==
Ranga Rao suffered from heart attack at Hyderabad in February 1974. He was admitted to Osmania General Hospital. Doctors suggested him to have "bypass surgery" and advised him to quit drinking, smoking & acting for sometime and take rest. But Ranga Rao neglected doctors' words. Unfortunately, he suffered from another heart stroke on 18 July 1974 at Madras. It proved to be fatal and the actor died before any medical treatment could be administered.

== Legacy ==
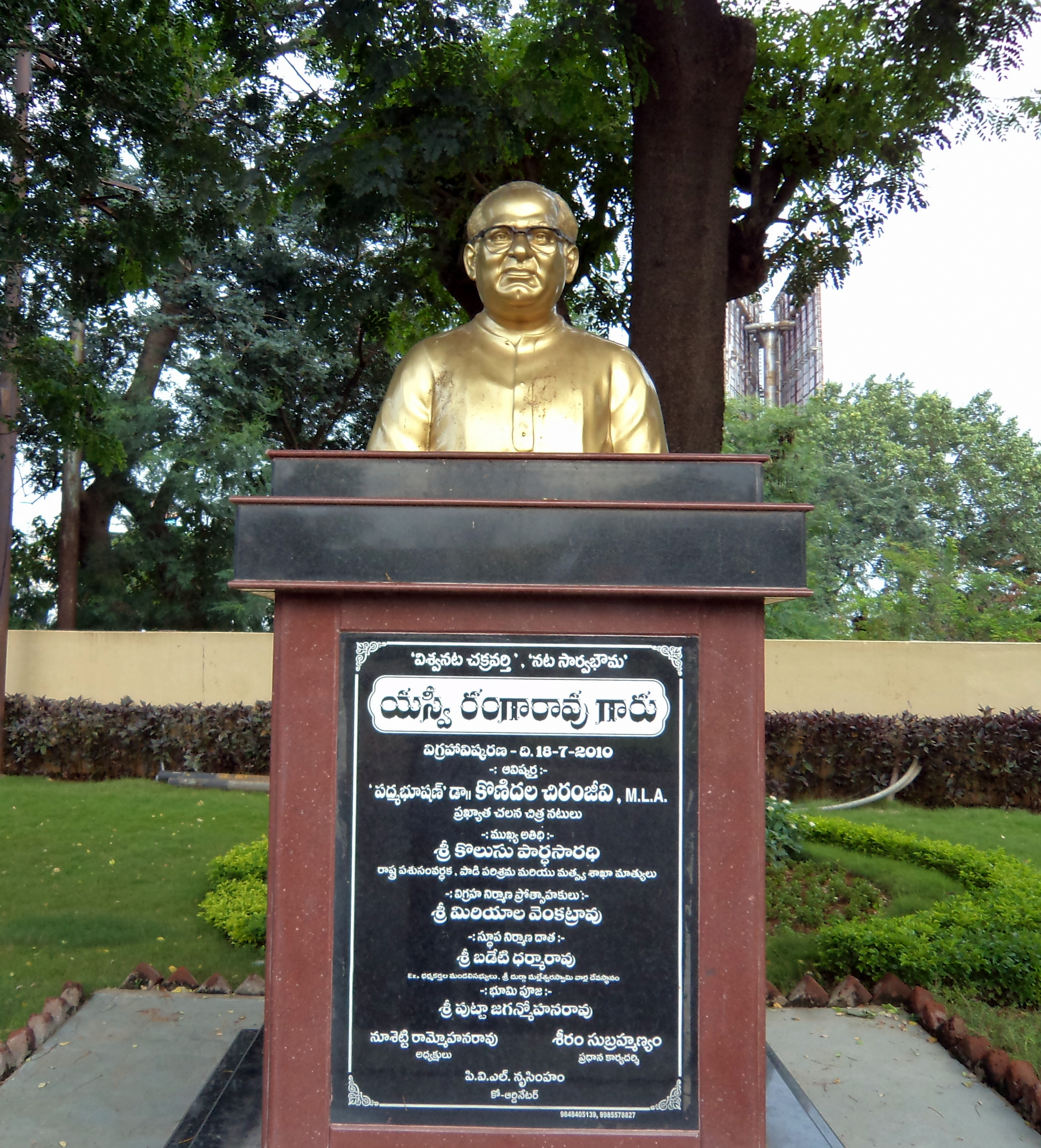
Statue of S. V. Ranga Rao, inaugurated by Chiranjeevi at Tummalapalli Kshetraya School of Arts in Vijayawada

Government of Andhra Pradesh instituted an award in his memory, presented every year to the best character acting performance, known as the S. V. Ranga Rao Award for Best Character Actor.

A bust-size bronze statue of Ranga Rao was unveiled by popular actor Chiranjeevi at Tummalapall Kalakshetram in Vijayawada in 2010. In 2018, N. Chandrababu Naidu, then Chief Minister of Andhra Pradesh unveiled a 12.5 feet bronze statue of Ranga Rao at Kalaparru on the outskirts of Eluru and announced that the state government was planning to establish a museum on Ranga Rao in Eluru.

Srivathsan Nadadhur of The Hindu wrote of him during his birth centenary in 2018 as follows, "S V Ranga Rao's diction, towering on-screen persona, impressive quirks to his character-sketches, the ability to draw inspiration from society and literature have cemented his ‘irreplaceable’ stature over the years."

CV Aravind of The News Minute wrote of him in 2018, "SV Ranga Rao was ranked on par with the superstars of the 1950s, 60s and 70s such as N. T .Rama Rao, Nageswara Rao, M. G. Ramachandran, and Sivaji Ganesan. Ranga Rao was one of the earliest to be hailed as a ‘method’ actor and a substandard performance from him was simply out of the question. Rated as one of the most dignified and cooperative stars, he was held in high regard by the acting fraternity."

== Awards ==
International honors

- Best Actor Award - 3rd Afro-Asian Film Festival held in Jakarta - (1963) - for Keechaka in Nartanasala
- Special Mention - 8th San Sebastián International Film Festival - (1960) for Nammina Bantu

Filmfare Awards South

- Filmfare Award for Best Telugu Film - (Director) - Chadarangam (1967)

Nandi Award for Best Feature Film (Director)

- Chadarangam (1967) - Second Best Feature Film (Silver)
- Bandhavyalu (1968) - Best Feature Film (Gold)

Other honors

- He was given distinguished titles such as Rashtrapati Award, Viswa Nata Chakravarti, Nata Sarvabhouma, Nata Sekhara, Nata Simha.

== Selected filmography ==
=== Actor ===
Year	Film	Character	Language	Notes
1947	Varudhini		Telugu	Debut Film
1949	Mana Desam		Telugu	
1950	Bhale Papa	Blind person	Telugu	
1950	Palletoori Pilla	Taatha	Telugu	
1950	Shavukaru	Sunnapu Rangadu	Telugu	
1950	Tirugubatu		Telugu	
1951	Akasaraju		Telugu	
1951	Navvite Navaratnalu		Telugu	
1951	Pathala Bhairavi	Nepala Mantrikudu	Telugu Tamil	
1952	Daasi	Badrinath	Telugu	
1952	Kalyanam Panni Paar		Tamil	
1952	Palletooru	Ganapati	Telugu	
1952	Pelli Chesi Choodu	Zamindar Veeyanna	Telugu	
1953	Bratuku Theruvu	Zamindar	Telugu	
1953	Chandirani	Prachandudu	Telugu	
1953	Chandirani	Prachandudu	Tamil	
1953	Devdas		Tamil	
1953	Devadasu	Zamindar Narayana Rao	Telugu	
1953	Jatakam		Telugu	
1953	Jatakaphalam		Telugu	
1953	Pardesi	Rangadu	Telugu	
1953	Pempudu Koduku		Telugu	
1953	Poongothai		Tamil	
1953	Rohini		Tamil	
1953	Sangham		Telugu	
1954	Annadata		Telugu	
1954	Anta Manavalle	Jagannatham	Telugu	
1954	Bangaru Papa	Kotayya	Telugu	
1954	Chandraharam		Tamil	
1954	Chandraharam	Dhoomakethu	Telugu	
1954	Chakrapani		Telugu	
1954	Rajee Naa Pranam		Telugu	
1954	Rajee En Kanmani	Rich man	Tamil	
1954	Raju Peda	King	Telugu	
1954	Thuli Visham	Naga Nadu King VeeraMarththandan	Tamil	
1955	Anarkali	Akbar	Telugu	
1955	Guna Sundari Katha	King Ugrasena	Telugu	
1955	Jayasimha	Rudrasimha	Telugu	
1955	Missamma	Gopalam	Telugu	
1955	Missiamma	Gopalan	Tamil	
1955	Santanam	Rangayya	Telugu	
1956	Charana Daasi	Raghavaiah	Telugu	
1956	Chintamani		Telugu	
1956	Marma Veeran		Tamil	guest appearance
1956	Kanakatara		Telugu	
1956	Naan Petra Selvam		Tamil	
1956	Mathar Kula Manickam		Tamil	
1957	Allauddin Adhbhuta Deepam	Jaffer, the magician	Telugu	
1957	Allavudeenum Arputha Vilakkum		Tamil	
1957	Maya Bazaar	Ghatotkajudu	Telugu	
1957	Maya Bazaar	Ghadotgajan	Tamil	
1957	Pathini Deivam		Tamil	
1957	Repu Neede		Telugu	
1957	Sarangadhara	Raja Raja Narendrudu	Telugu	
1957	Sati Savitri	Yamudu	Telugu	
1957	Soubhagyavathi	Maha Bhairavan, Bad Magician	Tamil	
1957	Engal Veettu Mahalakshmi	Lawyer Ganapathi	Tamil	
1957	Thodi Kodallu	Kutumba Rao	Telugu	
1957	Vinayaka Chaviti	Narakasurudu	Telugu	
1958	Bhookailas	Maayasura	Telugu	
1958	Bommala Pelli		Telugu	
1958	Chenchu Lakshmi	Hiranyakashipa	Tamil	
1958	Chenchu Lakshmi	Hiranyakashipu	Telugu	
1958	Kadan Vaangi Kalyanam		Tamil	
1958	Annaiyin Aanai		Tamil	
1958	Bommai Kalyanam	Veeramuthu	Tamil	
1958	Kudumba Gouravam		Tamil	
1958	Pelli Naati Pramanalu	Bheemasena Rao	Telugu	
1958	Sabaash Meena	Appadorai	Tamil	
1958	Anbu Engey	Masilamani Mudaliar	Tamil	
1958	Thirumanam	Damodharam	Tamil	
1958	Sarangadhara	King Narendra	Tamil	
1959	Mangalya Balam		Telugu	
1959	Appu Chesi Pappu Koodu	Diwan Bahadur Mukunda Rao	Telugu	
1959	Aval Yar		Tamil	
1959	Bhakta Ambarisha		Telugu	
1959	Jayabheri	Vijayananda Ramagajapati	Telugu	
1959	Kalaivanan		Tamil	
1959	Krishna Leelalu	Kamsa	Telugu	
1959	Raja Sevai		Tamil	
1959	Manjal Mahimai		Tamil	
1959	Rechukka Pagatichukka		Telugu	
1959	Vazhkai Oppantham		Tamil	
1960	Nammina Bantu		Telugu	
1960	Bhatti Vikramarka	Maantrikudu	Telugu	
1960	Deepavali	Narakasurudu	Telugu	
1960	Devanthakudu		Telugu	
1960	Harishchandra	Harischandra Maharaju	Telugu	
1960	Irumputhirai		Tamil	
1960	Mahakavi Kalidasu	Bhoja Raju	Telugu	
1960	Mamaku Tagga Alludu		Telugu	
1960	Naan Kanda Sorgam		Tamil	
1960	Padikkadha Medhai		Tamil	
1960	Pattaliyin Vetri		Tamil	
1960	Parthiban Kanavu	King Narasimhavarman	Tamil	
1960	Petra Manam		Tamil	
1960	Vidivelli		Tamil	
1961	Velugu Needalu	Rao Bahadur Venkataramaiah	Telugu	
1961	Ellam Unnakkaga		Tamil	
1961	Kalasivunte Kaladu Sukham		Telugu	
1961	Kappalottiya Thamizhan		Tamil	
1961	Kumudham	Public Prosecutor, Shanthi's father	Tamil	
1961	Krishna Prema		Telugu	
1961	Pangaaligal	One of the 3 Partners	Tamil	
1961	Pelli Thambulam		Telugu	
1961	Sati Sulochana		Telugu	
1961	Usha Parinayam	Banasura	Telugu	
1962	Atma Bandhuvu	Father	Telugu	
1962	Bandha Pasam		Tamil	
1962	Dakshayagnam	Daksha	Telugu	
1962	Padithal Mattum Podhuma		Tamil	
1962	Deivathin Deivam		Tamil	
1962	Muthu Mandapam		Tamil	
1962	Nichaya Thaamboolam	Ranganathan	Tamil	
1962	Sarada		Tamil	
1962	Gaali Medalu	Paanakaalu	Telugu	
1962	Gundamma Katha	Ramabhadraiah	Telugu	
1962	Kaathiruntha Kangal		Tamil	
1962	Manchi Manasulu		Telugu	
1962	Manithan Maravillai		Tamil	
1962	Padandi Munduku		Telugu	
1962	Sri Srikakula Andhra Mahavishnuvu Katha	Suchandrasena Maharaju	Telugu	
1962	Tiger Ramudu		Telugu	
1962	Annai		Tamil	
1962	Visha Binduvu		Telugu	
1962	Kavitha		Tamil	
1963	Annai Illam		Tamil	
1963	Iruvar Ullam		Tamil	
1963	Kalyaniyin Kanavan	Kalyani's Father	Tamil	
1963	Kungumam	Punniyakodi / James / Sambasivam	Tamil	
1963	Needhikkuppin Paasam		Tamil	
1963	Karpagam	Nallasivam	Tamil	
1963	Narthanasala	Keechakudu	Telugu	Best Actor - 3rd Afro-Asian Film Festival, Jakarta
1963	Naanum Oru Penn		Tamil	
1963	Thobuttuvulu	Garataiah	Telugu	
1964	Bobbili Yudham	Tandra Paparayudu	Telugu	
1964	Kai Kodutha Deivam	Mahadevan	Tamil	
1964	Main Bhi Ladki Hoon		Hindi	
1964	Murali Krishna	Father of Murali	Telugu	
1964	Ramudu Bheemudu		Telugu	
1964	Server Sundaram		Tamil	
1964	Pachai Vilakku		Tamil	
1965	Enga Veetu Pillai	Father of Saroja Devi	Tamil	
1965	Kakkum Karangal		Tamil	
1965	Aadabrathuku		Telugu	
1965	Naadi Aada Janme		Telugu	
1965	Pandava Vanavasam	Duryodhanudu	Telugu	
1965	Vaazhkai Padagu	Rajan Father	Tamil	
1965	Paditha Manaivi		Tamil	
1966	Aata Bommalu		Telugu	
1965	Sati Sakkubai		Telugu	
1965	Thodu Needa		Telugu	
1966	Chilaka Gorinka		Telugu	
1966	Kumari Penn	Grandfather of Shyamala	Tamil	
1966	Selvam		Tamil	
1966	Thedi Vandha Thirumagal		Tamil	
1966	Thattungal Thirakkappadum	Church Father	Tamil	
1966	Mohini Bhasmasura	Bhasmasura	Telugu	
1966	Adugu Jaadalu	Dr. Krishna	Telugu	
1966	Ramu		Telugu	
1967	Pesum Dheivam		Tamil	
1967	Bhakta Prahlada		Tamil	
1967	Bhakta Prahlada	Hiraynakashipudu	Telugu	
1967	Chadarangam		Telugu	
1967	Rahasyam		Telugu	
1967	Punyavathi		Telugu	
1967	Thaikku Thalaimagan	Cholaiya Pannaiyar Dharmalingham	Tamil	
1967	Kan Kanda Deivam	The Landlord	Tamil	
1968	Bandhavyalu		Telugu	
1968	Bandhipotu Dongalu	Bandipotu Malludora	Telugu	
1968	Lakshmi Nivasam		Telugu	
1968	Chinnari Papalu		Telugu	
1968	Poovum Pottum	Professor Raja Rathinam	Tamil	
1969	Nam Naadu	Dharmalingham	Tamil	
1969	Jagath Kiladeelu	CID Gangaram / Gangulu	Telugu	
1969	Sivandha Mann		Tamil	
1969	Kula Vilakku		Tamil	
1969	Kuzhandhai Ullam		Tamil	
1969	Mooga Nomu		Telugu	
1970	Sambarala Rambabu		Telugu	
1970	Jagath Jetteelu	Major Raghunath	Telugu	
1971	Dasara Bullodu	Bhushaiah	Telugu	
1971	Debbaku Tha Dongala Mutha		Telugu	
1971	Praptham		Tamil	
1971	Thenum Paalum		Tamil	
1971	Irulum Oliyum		Tamil	
1971	Aathi Parasakthi	Dhakshan	Tamil	
1971	Anuradha	Bhushaiah	Telugu	
1971	Prema Nagar	Zamindar	Telugu	
1971	Sampoorna Ramayanam	Ravana	Telugu	
1972	Vidhyarthigale Ithile Ithile	Principal	Malayalam	
1972	Bala Bharatam	Bheeshma	Telugu	
1972	Iddaru Ammayilu	Lawyer Narayan Rao	Telugu	
1972	Kathula Rattayya		Telugu	
1972	Koduku Kodalu		Telugu	
1972	Raja	Nagalingam Boopathy	Tamil	
1972	Pandanti Kapuram	Head of the family	Telugu	
1972	Papam Pasivaadu	Venugopal	Telugu	
1972	Vasantha Maligai		Tamil	Reused scenes from Prema Nagar
1972	Vazhaiyadi Vazhai		Tamil	
1973	Anbu Sagodharargal	Elder Brother	Tamil	
1973	Devudu Chesina Manushulu		Telugu	
1973	Bangaru Babu	Raghavaiah	Telugu	
1972	Thatha-Manavadu	Grandfather Rangayya	Telugu	
1973	Minor Babu		Telugu	
1973	Samsaram Sagaram		Telugu	
1974	Andaru Dongale	Chanti Babu	Telugu	
1974	Bangaru Kalalu		Telugu	
1974	Chakravakam	Dharma Rayudu	Telugu	
1974	Galipatalu	Ganganna and Manganna	Telugu	
1974	Inti Kodalu		Telugu	
1974	Premalu Pellilu		Telugu	
1974	Pillai Selvam		Tamil	
1974	Sivakamyin Selvan		Tamil	Last film in Tamil
1975	Mallela Manasulu	Ramachandraiah	Telugu	
1975	Yashoda Krishna	Kamsa	Telugu	Last film in Telugu
1988	Yamudiki Mogudu	Balu's father	Telugu	Portrait
1990	Athisaya Piravi	Balu's father	Tamil	Portrait (reprised)

=== Director ===
- Bandhavyalu (1968)
- Chadarangam (1967)

=== Producer ===
- Bandhavyalu (1968) (producer)
- Chadarangam (1967) (producer)
- Naadi Aada Janme (1965) (producer)
- Sukhadukhalu (1969)
