= 30th International Film Festival of India =

Indian film festival in 1999

- Awarded for: Best of World cinema
- Presented by: Directorate of Film Festivals
- Presented on: 20 January 1999
- Official website: www.iffigoa.org

Highlights
- Lifetime achievement: Bernardo Bertolucci

The 30th International Film Festival of India was held from 10–20 January 1999 in Hyderabad, India. The non-competitive edition was restricted to lifetime achievement awards, and tributes. Argentina was the country of focus in the festival, whilst Bollywood actor Dev Anand was the chief guest.

== Winners ==
- Lifetime Achievement Award - Bernardo Bertolucci (Italy)

=== Opening Film ===
- Elizabeth by Shekhar Kapur

=== Woman in Cinema Honors ===
- Bhanumathi Ramakrishna - Holding Sway for 60 years
- Shabana Azmi - The Icon and the Actress
- Savitri - A Moon Among Stars

=== Honors ===
- Homage - Akira Kurosawa (Japan)
- Centenary Tribute - Sergei Eisenstein (Russia)

=== Tributes ===
- Theo Angelopoulos (Greece)
- Hou Hsiao-hsien (Taiwan)
- Zsolt Kézdi-Kovács (Hungary)
