= Kan Kanda Deivam =

- Poster
- Directed by: K. S. Gopalakrishnan
- Written by: K. S. Gopalakrishnan
- Starring: S. V. Ranga Rao; Padmini; S. V. Subbaiah; Nagesh
- Cinematography: R. Sampath
- Edited by: R. Devan
- Music by: K. V. Mahadevan
- Production company: Kamal Brothers
- Distributed by: Jai Maruthi Combines
- Release date: 15 September 1967
- Running time: 174 minutes
- Country: India
- Language: Tamil

Kan Kanda Deivam (transl. Palpable God) is a 1967 Indian Tamil-language drama film written and directed by K. S. Gopalakrishnan, and produced by Kamal Brothers. It stars S. V. Ranga Rao, Padmini, S. V. Subbaiah and Nagesh. The film was released on 15 September 1967 and emerged a commercial success. The film was remade in Telugu as Bandhavyalu (1968), with Rango Rao both directing and reprising his role. It was later remade in Tamil again by the same director as Padikkadha Pannaiyar with Sivaji Ganesan playing the lead.

== Plot ==
Ranga Rao plays a widowed, well-respected, just and fair landlord with a blind son while Subbaiah plays his brother. Innocent Subbaiah, along with his wife Padmini, their daughter and their three good-for-nothing sons depend on Ranga Rao for everything as he is the one who is aware of worldly ways. Living opposite them is Thevar and his brother Sivakumar with Thevar being a criminal and a smuggler while his brother played by Sivakumar hates him and leaves the house only to be employed by Ranga Rao as his servant. He is in love with the daughter.

Thevar manipulates the sons and through them, Subbaiah causing a wedge in the family while using the father and sons to collateral the huge bank loan that he owes in the guise of selling a car. Sensing the danger, Ranga Rao immediately calls for a partition separating all useless properties into one portion in the name of his younger brother while retaining all the good ones over to him to save them from being taken over by the bank. However, except for the sons, the village as well as Subbaiah still trusts Ranga Rao. Thevar them blemishes Ranga Rao through a girl who turns out to be a girl jilted by of the brothers through whom she has a child. Finally, Ranga Rao, using his worldly cleverness exposes Thevar's activity, retains all the property by getting Thevar to remove the collateral and then sends him to jail for his illegal activities reuniting the family.

== Cast ==
- S. V. Ranga Rao as the landlord
- Padmini as the landlord's sister-in-law
- S. V. Subbaiah as the landlord's brother
- Nagesh as the lawyer
- V. Nagayya as Neighbour
- O. A. K. Thevar as Ekambaram a criminal
- S.Rama Rao as Criminal assistant
- Sivakumar as Servant
- S. V. Sahasranamam as the judge
- Kallapart Natarajan as Elder Son
- Maharan as Middle Son
- A. Veerappan as youngest son
- Vijayarani as daughter

== Production ==
Kan Kanda Deivam was directed by K. S. Gopalakrishnan and produced by Kamal Brothers. R. Sampath was the cinematographer and R. Devan was the editor. Some song sequences from the film were shot on an agricultural background. The final length of the film was 4845 metres.

== Soundtrack ==
The music was composed by K. V. Mahadevan, with lyrics by Udumalai Narayana Kavi and Vaali.

Track listing
No.	Title	Singer(s)	Length
1.	"Kannukutti Kannukutti"	P. Susheela, T. M. Soundararajan
2.	"Vazhkai Embathu Jolly"	A. L. Raghavan, S. C. Krishnan, Ponnusamy
3.	"Thenna Marathile"	T. M. Soundararajan
4.	"Aandavane Sami"	T. M. Soundararajan, P. Susheela, Party

== Release and reception ==
Kan Kanda Deivam was released on 15 September 1967, and was distributed by Jai Maruthi Combines. The film was critically and commercially successful, with Kalki appreciating Gopalakrishnan's direction and writing.
