= Sontha Vooru (1956 film) =

1956 Telugu-language drama film

- Theatrical release poster
- Directed by: E. S. N. Murthy
- Screenplay by: I. S. N. Murthy
- Story by: Ravuru
- Produced by: G. Sadasivudu
- Starring: N. T. Rama Rao; Sowcar Janaki
- Cinematography: A. Vincent
- Edited by: Kandaswamy
- Music by: Ghantasala
- Production company: G.V.S. Productions
- Release date: 23 May 1956
- Country: India
- Language: Telugu

Sontha Vooru (transl. Native Village) is a 1956 Indian Telugu-language drama film, produced by G. Sadasivudu under the G.V.S. Productions banner and directed by E. S. N. Murthy. It stars N. T. Rama Rao and Sowcar Janaki, with music composed by Ghantasala.

== Cast ==
- N. T. Rama Rao as Madhav
- Sowcar Janaki as Lakshmi
- C.S.R. as Rayanam
- Ramana Reddy
- Amarnath as Chinnabai
- Vangara
- Chadalavada
- Rajasulochana as Aruna
- Suryakantham
- Hemalatha
- Surabhi Kamalabai
- Chandra Kumari

== Soundtrack ==
Music composed by Ghantasala.

Song title	Lyrics	Singers	length
"Sri Gopala Radhalola"	Ravuru	Ghantasala	3:02
"Orai English Patham"	Ravuru	Ghantasala, Jikki	1:58
"Maa Paale Galavada"	Malladi	Jikki	
"Ranmahendra Kavendru Ratnala Medalo"	Ravuru	Ghantasala	1:34
"Vennela Viruyunura"	Malladi,	Raghavulu,Leela,Jikki	3:16
"Manavoore Bharatha Desam"	Ravuru	Ghantasala	3:14
"Swagathamboyi"	Ravuru	Ghantasala	1:24
"Changu Changuna "	Ravuru	P.Leela	3:09
"Yemi Prabhu"	Malladi	P.Leela	2:56
"Malle Moggalaraa"	Ravuru	Ghantasala, P.Leela +	7:40
"Pantapolalalo Egire Jantha"	Ravuru	Ghantasala, P.Leela	2:47
"Eelanayya Swamy Ee Velakolam Mato Endukayya"	Ravuru	Ghantasala	2:55
"Oho Panta Raithaa"			
