= Neerkumizhi =

1965 film by K. Balachander

- Theatrical release poster
- Directed by: K. Balachander
- Written by: K. Balachander
- Based on: Neerkumizhi by K. Balachander
- Produced by: A. K. Velan
- Starring: Nagesh; Sowcar Janaki; V. Gopalakrishnan; Major Sundarrajan; Jayanthi
- Cinematography: Nimay Ghosh
- Edited by: V. B. Natarajan
- Music by: V. Kumar
- Production company: Thirumalai Films
- Release date: 23 October 1965
- Running time: 129 minutes
- Country: India
- Language: Tamil

Neerkumizhi (pronounced [n̪iːɾkumiɻi] transl. Water bubble) is a 1965 Indian Tamil-language film directed by K. Balachander in his directorial debut. It portrayed the stories of patients and staff in a hospital setting. The film is based on Balachander's play of the same name. It was released on 23 October 1965. The film was remade in Telugu as Chiranjeevi (1969), and in Malayalam as Aaradimanninte Janmi (1972).

== Plot ==
Sethu, an orphan is a patient who is constantly playing pranks on the other hospital patients, the nurse in-charge and the doctors. A romantic bond develops between a young doctor, Indra and another patient, a football player, Arun much to the chagrin of her father, the senior-most doctor in the hospital. The football player has a greedy brother who tries to arrange for his sibling to be killed. How Sethu, on learning that he is terminally ill cherishes the short time he has to live and takes it upon himself to unite the lovers forms the rest of the story.

== Cast ==
- Nagesh as Sethu
- Sowcar Janaki as Dr. Indra
- V. Gopalakrishnan as Arun
- Major Sundarrajan as Dr. Balakrishnan
- Jayanthi as the nurse in-charge
- I. S. R. as patient
- S. N. Lakshmi
- Shoba as nurse

== Production ==
Neerkumizhi marked the directorial debut of K. Balachander who earlier worked as a screenwriter and it was based on his stage play of the same name. The film was produced by A. K. Velan under Thirumalai Films. Cinematography was handled by Nimay Ghosh, and the art direction by Ranganna. A. K. Velan who saw the play decided to adapt it as a film and insisted Balachander to direct the film adaptation to which he agreed despite initial reservations due to his lack of knowledge about film direction. Sowcar Janaki, Nagesh, Major Sundarrajan and V. Gopalakrishnan, who were part of the play, returned to the film adaptation. Balachander said that he was advised by friends and relatives to change the title but he was adamant and kept the title.

== Soundtrack ==
The music was composed by V. Kumar, in his debut. Balachander wanted Sirkazhi Govindarajan to sing the song "Aadi Adangum" as he felt that "his emphasis on certain words and letters always produced the effect required." The title song is based on "The Green Leaves of Summer".

Track listing
No.	Title	Lyrics	Singer(s)	Length
1.	"Aadi Adangum Vazhkkaiyada"	Suratha	Sirkazhi Govindarajan	3:16
2.	"Kanni Nadhiyoram"	Alangudi Somu	T. M. Soundararajan, P. Susheela	3:13
3.	"Neeril Neendhidum"	Alangudi Somu	P. Susheela	3:26
Total length:				9:55

== Release and reception ==
Neerkumizhi was released on 23 October 1965, during Diwali day. Ananda Vikatan, in a review dated 14 November 1965, said that despite its few flaws, the film could be watched once for Nagesh. Writing in Sport and Pastime, T. M. Ramachandran named it his favourite Diwali release of the year because "it blazes a new trail in screen entertainment", while calling it better than the original play. Kalki praised the film for its story and Nagesh's performance.
