= Sathi Shakthi =

- Directed by: Kanagal Prabhakar Shastry
- Written by: Kanagal Prabhakar Shastry
- Screenplay by: Kanagal Prabhakar Shastry
- Produced by: Kanagal Prabhakar Shastry
- Starring: Rajkumar; Ramkumar; K. S. Ashwath; B. Raghavendra Rao
- Cinematography: Karnan-Sundarbabu
- Edited by: C. V. Raju
- Music by: T. G. Lingappa
- Production company: Matha Pictures
- Distributed by: Matha Pictures
- Release date: 17 June 1963
- Running time: 151 minutes
- Country: India
- Language: Kannada

Sathi Shakthi is a 1963 Indian Kannada-language film directed and produced by Kanagal Prabhakar Shastry. The film stars Rajkumar, Ramkumar, K. S. Ashwath and B. Raghavendra Rao. The film has musical score by T. G. Lingappa. Puttanna Kanagal assisted his brother during the shoot of this movie. This was the first movie in which Rajkumar played a dual role in full-fledged manner.

Rajkumar played the role of mantravaadi for the only time in his career in this movie. While Puttanna Kanagal and K. S. L. Swamy worked as assistant directors, Rajkumar's younger brother SP Varadaraj essayed a small role in the movie. The title card of the movie credited the story to have been inspired by Pampa Kshetra Mahatme.

== Cast ==
- Rajkumar as Rakthaaksha/Viroopaaksha (dual roles)
- Ramkumar
- K. S. Ashwath
- B. Raghavendra Rao
- Narasimharaju
- Vijayarao
- S. P. Varadaraj
- K. Amaranath
- H. Krishna Shastry
- Vijayakumar
- Swamy
- Guggu
- Ganapathi Bhat
- Sorat Ashwath
- Shivashankar
- M. V. Rajamma
- Sahukar Janaki
- K. Pushpavalli
- Sujatha
- Papamma
- B. Jaya
- Lalitha Shastry

== Soundtrack ==
The music was composed by T. G. Lingappa.

No.	Song	Singers	Lyrics	Length (m:ss)
1	"Aadi Paadi Odanaadi"	Ghantasala, P. Leela	Kanagal Prabhakara Sastry	03:28
2	"Acha Mallige Hoovu"	P. Leela	Kanagal Prabhakara Sastry	03:17
3	"Baa Thaaye Baa"	P. Leela	Kanagal Prabhakara Sastry	03:21
4	"Chandramaama"	S. Janaki	Kanagal Prabhakara Sastry	02:31
5	"Ee Vilaasi"	S. Janaki, P. B. Sreenivas	Kanagal Prabhakara Sastry	03:19
6	"Huyyo Huyyo"	P. Leela	Kanagal Prabhakara Sastry	03:22
7	"Maathege Migilaada"	Komala, Kamala	Kanagal Prabhakara Sastry	03:17
8	"Pavadisu Phalaakshai"	P. Leela	Kanagal Prabhakara Sastry	03:24
9	"Sri Mathe"	P. Leela	Kanagal Prabhakara Sastry	03:12
