= Bandhavyalu =

- Directed by: S. V. Ranga Rao
- Written by: D. V. Narasa Raju
- Produced by: Badeti Satya Narayana & Putta Venkata Rao
- Starring: S. V. Ranga Rao; Dhulipala; Savitri; V. Nagayya; Lakshmi
- Music by: Saluri Hanumantha Rao
- Release date: 1968
- Country: India
- Language: Telugu

Bandhavyalu is a 1968 Telugu film produced and directed by S. V. Ranga Rao. The film is a remake of the 1967 Tamil movie Kan Kanda Deivam. The director also reprised his role from the 1967 film. Bandhavyalu was also the Telugu film debut for the South female superstar, Lakshmi.

== Plot ==
Ranga Rao is the landlord in a village. He lives with his brother Dhulipala. Savithri, wife of Dhulipala, takes care of the daily chores very well. They have three sons, who study in town.

It is the story of the relations and bonding between family members. Ranga Rao's family and Rajnal's family are neighbors. Ranga Rao has a brother. His brother and his wife are very kind at heart and their family is a very organized family, but Rajnal's brother Suryam (Chandra Mohan) is very angry with his brother and doesn't support him in anything. The film shows differences in bonding between a healthy related family and a weakly related family.

== Cast ==
- S. V. Ranga Rao
- Dhulipala ... Brother of the main character
- V. Nagayya ... Acharyulu
- Chandra Mohan...Suryam
- Lakshmi (debut) ... Lakshmi
- Savitri ... Sister-in-Law of main character
- Rajanala Kaleswara Rao...Panakala Swamy
- Haranath...Gopalam
- Allu Ramalingaiah...Shatakopam

== Crew ==
- Director: S. V. Ranga Rao
- Producers: Badeti Satyanarayana, Putta Venkat Rao and S. V. Ranga Rao
- Production Company: S.V.R. Films
- Dialogues: D. V. Narasa Raju
- Lyricist: C. Narayana Reddy, Kosaraju Raghavaiah
- Music Director: Saluri Hanumantha Rao
- Playback singers: Ghantasala and P. Susheela

== Songs ==
The lyrics were written by C. Narayanaya Reddy and Kosaraju Raghavaiah. The music score was composed by Saluri Hanumanta Rao. The playback singers were Ghantasala Venkateswara Rao, B. Vasanta and P. Susheela.

- "Atu Gantala Motalu Gana Gana" (Singers: Ghantasala and B. Vasantha; Cast: Chandramohan and Lakshmi)
- "Avvai Suvai" (Singers: Ghantasala and P. Susheela; Cast: Chandramohan and Lakshmi)
- "Maa Raitu Baabayya"
- "Manchitanaaniki" (Singer: Ghantasala)
- "Tuvvayi Tuvvayi"

== Awards ==
- Badeti Satyanarayana & Putta Venkata rao won the Nandi Award for Best Feature Film - Gold in 1968.
