= Sumangali (1965 film) =

- Theatrical release poster
- Directed by: Adurthi Subba Rao
- Written by: Acharya Aatreya (dialogues)
- Screenplay by: Adurthi Subba Rao
- Story by: K. S. Gopalakrishnan
- Based on: Sarada (1962)
- Produced by: T. Govindarajan
- Starring: Akkineni Nageswara Rao; Savitri
- Cinematography: P. L. Roy
- Edited by: T. Krishna
- Music by: K. V. Mahadevan
- Production companies: Venus Pictures; Ashok Movies
- Release date: 1 January 1965
- Running time: 153 minutes
- Country: India
- Language: Telugu

Sumangali is a 1965 Telugu-language drama film, produced by T. Govindarajan under the Venus Pictures & Ashok Movies banner and directed by Adurthi Subba Rao. It stars Akkineni Nageswara Rao and Savitri, with music composed by K. V. Mahadevan. The film is a remake of the Tamil film Sarada (1962).

== Cast ==
- Akkineni Nageswara Rao as Viswam
- Savitri as Sarada
- Jaggayya as Shekar
- V. Nagayya as Venkata Chalam
- Gummadi as Srihari Rao
- Relangi as Dharma Raju
- Padmanabham as Kondandam
- G. Varalakshmi as Visalakshamma
- Girija as Dharma Raju's wife
- Sandhya as Srihari Rao's wife
- Vasanthi as Uma
- Sobhan Babu (Cameo appearance)
- Jayanthi (Cameo appearance)

== Crew ==
- Art: G. V. Subba Rao
- Choreography: P. L. Gopala Krishnan
- Lyrics - Dialogues: Acharya Aatreya
- Playback: Ghantasala, P. Susheela, S. Janaki, P. B. Sreenivas, K. Jamuna Rani, L. R. Eswari, Swarnalata, Vasantha
- Music: K. V. Mahadevan
- Story: K. S. Gopala Krishna
- Editing: T. Krishna
- Cinematography: P. L. Roy
- Producer: T. Govindarajan
- Screenplay - Director: Adurthi Subba Rao
- Banner: Venus Pictures & Ashok Movies
- Release Date: 1 January 1965

== Soundtrack ==
Sumangali

Film score by K. V. Mahadevan
- Released: 1965
- Genre: Soundtrack
- Length: 31:16
- Producer: K. V. Mahadevan

K. V. Mahadevan chronology
Aathma Balam (1964)	Sumangali (1965)	Antastulu (1965)

Music composed by K. V. Mahadevan. The song Kotha Pelli Koothura is a blockbuster. Lyrics were written by Acharya Aatreya. Music released on Audio Company.

S. No.	Song title	Singers	length
1	"Aa Nati Manavudu"	Ghantasala, P. Susheela	4:10
2	"Kanulu Kanulatho"	Ghantasala, P. Susheela	3:33
3	"Kotha Pelli Koothura"	K. Jamuna Rani, L. R. Eswari, Swarnalata, Vasantha	4:16
4	"Kannulu Neeve Kavali"	Ghantasala, P. Susheela	4:33
5	"Yevevo Chilipi Talapulu"	P. B. Sreenivas, S. Janaki	4:28
6	"Valapu Vale Thiyyaga"	Ghantasala	3:09
7	"Siga Loki Virulicchi"	Ghantasala	7:07
