= Devadasu Malli Puttadu =

- Theatrical release poster
- Directed by: Dasari Narayana Rao
- Written by: Dasari Narayana Rao
- Produced by: Srinivasulu; Pandurangappa
- Starring: Akkineni Nageswara Rao; Savitri; Vanisri
- Cinematography: K. S. Mani
- Edited by: K. Babu
- Music by: S. Rajeswara Rao
- Production company: Devi Art Productions
- Release date: 1978
- Running time: 151 minutes
- Country: India
- Language: Telugu

Devadasu Malli Puttadu (transl. Devadasu is reborn) is a 1978 Indian Telugu-language drama film written and directed by Dasari Narayana Rao. It stars Akkineni Nageswara Rao and Vanisri, with music composed by S. Rajeswara Rao. It is produced by Srinivasulu and Pandurangappa. The film is a sequel to Devadasu (1953), with Nageswara Rao reprising his role.

== Cast ==
- Akkineni Nageswara Rao as Sridhar Raja/Devadasu
- Savitri as Parvati
- Vanisri as Aruna /Chandramukhi
- Jaya Prada as Shanti
- Gummadi as Sripathi Raja
- Allu Ramalingaiah as Maruti Rao
- Mohan Babu as Mohan Babu
- M. Prabhakar Reddy as Aruna's brother-in-law
- Kanta Rao as Dr. T. L. K. Rao
- Rajanala as Raja Ranga Raju
- Sowcar Janaki as Aruna's sister

== Music ==
Music was composed by S. Rajeswara Rao.

Song title	Lyrics	Singers	length
"Anuraagame Oka Aalayam"	C. Narayana Reddy	V. Ramakrishna, P. Susheela	4:33
Ajantha	"Dasam Gopalakrishna"	S. P. Balasubrahmanyam, Vasantha	7:46
"Evariki Evaru"	C. Narayana Reddy	V. Ramakrishna	5:27
"Nadi Veedhina"	Gopi	V. Ramakrishna	4:22
"Dhosita Siri Siri"	Veturi	V. Ramakrishna, P. Susheela	4:46
"Dikkulu Kalise Samayam"	Veturi	Ramana	5:42
