= Ghar Basake Dekho =

- Directed by: Kishore Sahu
- Written by: Prabhulal Dwivedi
- Produced by: Trikambhai Dave; Bal Chander Shukla
- Starring: Manoj Kumar; Rajshree; Mehmood; Savitri; Shyama
- Cinematography: Bipin Gajjar
- Edited by: Pratap Dave
- Music by: Chitragupta
- Production company: Ratandeep Pictures
- Release date: 1963
- Running time: 140 minutes
- Country: India
- Language: Hindi

Ghar Basake Dekho (Start A Family) is a 1963 Hindi family drama film, directed by Kishore Sahu. The film was produced by Trikambhai Dave and Bal Chander Shukla for Ratandeep Pictures, with music composed by Chitragupta and lyrics written by Rajendra Krishan. The story was taken from the Gujarati stage writer Prabhulal Dwivedi's story, 'Grahasti'. The screenplay and dialogues were by Rajendra Krishan.

Savitri, a top South Indian actress, made her Hindi film debut in Ghar Basake Dekho in a supporting role. The cast included Manoj Kumar, Rajshree, Shyama, Sudesh Kumar, Mehmood, Johnny Walker and Lalita Pawar.

Mehmood was nominated for the Filmfare Award for Best Supporting Actor.

Ghar Basake Dekho was a family drama with romance and comedy interwoven in the story. The story revolves around a widowed mother, who mortgages her village house to educate her son in the city. The film then follows his marriage to a woman of his choice, who mistreats his family, and the repercussions it has on family and friends.

== Plot ==
Kamal Mehra lives in a village with his mother Shanta and younger sister, Sharda. They are poor and his mother has to mortgage her house in the village in order to send Kamal to Bombay for higher education. She expects him to pay off the mortgage debt once he gets a job. When Kamal gets a job, he court-marries Mona and then they visit his family in village, revealing there that they got married. Mona considers herself too modern for the village and gets bored there and soon enough both of them leaves for Bombay. When Kamal returns to his city life, he eventually stops sending money to his village family due to his increasing expenditures. Sometime late, Shanta and Sharda are called to Bombay by Mona who writes a false letter mentioning Kamal is not well. In city, both Shanta and Sharda are ill-treated by Mona. Owing to her spendthrift habits, Mona depletes all earnings and savings of Kamal. One day, when Kamal goes on office work to Pune, Mona fights with Shanta and Sharda following which both of them leave the house to return to their village.

On the way to railway station, Shanta is hit by Kumar's car, who takes them to his home for treatment. Kumar insists that they stay at his place till the mother recovers. When Kamal returns home from Pune, he becomes upset to see his mother and sister missing. He leaves his office money (which he collected from Puna) with Mona, and goes off to his village to look for them. Meanwhile, Kumar and Sharda falls in love with each other and Kumar asks Shanta's permission to marry Sharda and she agrees. Mona spends three-fourths of the money that Kamal had left in her care. Learning this, now Kamal has to find ways to return the money to his employer. Kumar is actually Kamal's employer. Shanta and Sharda become aware of this fact when they see Kumar shouting at Kamal for misusing office funds for his personal use. Kumar threatens Kamal to be thrown behind bars if he doesn't return the money in time. Sensing their misfortune, Shanta and Sharda run away from Kumar's house without telling him anything. Finally, through emotional chain of events, Kamal reunites with his mother and sister; Mona learns her lesson, and Kumar and Sharda get together and all ends well.

There is a sub-plot in the form of Kamal and Mona's neighbors; one is Sunder and his wife Geeta, who is shown as the traditional wife in comparison to Mona. Another neighbor is Jackson, who has left his wife Ganga in the village.

== Cast ==
- Manoj Kumar as Kumar
- Rajshree as Sharda Mehra
- Shyama as Mona Mehra
- Sudesh Kumar as Kamal Mehra
- Mehmood as Sunder
- Savitri as Geeta: Sunder's wife
- Lalita Pawar as Shanta Mehra
- Johnny Walker as Jaikishen Ram Agnihotri, alias "Jackson"
- Minu Mumtaz as Ganga Agnihotri
- Leela Mishra as Kashi: Ganga's mother
- Uma Khosla as Kavita Kapoor: Mohana's friend
- Shivraj as Ramprasad: Sunder's father
- Randhir

== Soundtrack ==
One of the popular numbers from the film was "Tumne Hansi Hi Hansi Mein", sung by Lata Mangeshkar and Mahendra Kapoor. The composer was Chitragupta and the lyrics were written by Rajendra Krishan. The playback singing was provided by Lata Mangeshkar, Mohammed Rafi, Suman Kalyanpur, Mahendra Kapoor, and Usha Mangeshkar.

=== Songlist ===
#	Title	Singer
1	"Ae Mere Pyar Bata"	Lata Mangeshkar, Mahendra Kapoor
2	"Tumne Hansi Hi Hansi Mein Kyun"	Lata Mangeshkar, Mahendra Kapoor
3	"Khush Rahe Teri Nagri"	Lata Mangeshkar
4	"Jidhar Ji Mein Aaya Udhar Hum Chale"	Suman Kalyanpur, Usha Mangeshkar
5	"Ye Ras Teri Baton Ka Chocolate"	Mohammed Rafi
6	"Aap Ki Ankhon Ka Mere Dil Pe Yeh Ehsaan Hai"	
