= Chuzhi =

- Directed by: Triprayar Sukumaran
- Story by: S. G. Bhasker
- Produced by: Hussain; Salam Karassery
- Starring: Savitri; Salam; Sujatha
- Cinematography: Moorthy
- Edited by: Ravi
- Music by: M. S. Baburaj
- Production company: Navadhara Productions
- Release date: 7 December 1973
- Country: India
- Language: Malayalam

Chuzhi (transl. Circle) is a 1973 Indian Malayalam-language drama film, directed by Triprayar Sukumaran. The film stars Savitri, Salam and Sujatha. It is the only Malayalam film in which Savitri acted as a heroine. The film was released on 7 December 1973.

== Plot ==
Varghese is a planter who lives with his wife, Elizabeth, and daughter, Beena, on the tea estates he owns. After the death of his son, Varghese begins to drink in his depression and seduces his wife. Elizabeth becomes an alcoholic.

Varghese dies and Elizabeth appoints Baby, the son of her faithful servant Antony, to manage the tea estates. Baby and Beena are schoolmates. Baby is naturally corrupt, but Beena, who is in love with him, is confident that she can change him.

Elizabeth continues to deteriorate. In a drunken stupor, she even has a physical relationship with Baby and becomes pregnant.

Beena finds out. In shame and remorse, Elizabeth commits suicide. Beena rushes to shoot Baby. But before she can do so, Baby kills himself. Beena becomes a nun.

== Cast ==
- Savitri as Elizabeth
- Salam as Baby
- Sujatha as Beena
- Kottarakkara Sreedharan Nair
- N. Govindan Kutty as Varghese
- Bahadur
- Nilambur Balan
- Abbas as Anthony

== Production ==
The film was shot at Newton and Syamala studios and at Kalpetta in Wayanad district. The dialogues and screenplay were written by Salam and N. P. Mohammed respectively. The film was based on a story written by S. G. Bhasker. Cinematography was handled by Moorthy and editing by Ravi. Savitri played the role of an alcoholic.

== Soundtrack ==
The music was composed by M. S. Baburaj.

No.	Title	Singer(s)	Length
1.	"Madhura Madhurame"	K. J. Yesudas
2.	"Akkaldaamayil"	K. J. Yesudas
3.	"Hridhayathi Nirayunna"	S. Janaki
4.	"Kandu Randu Kannu"	H. Mehboob, Choir
5.	"Oru Chilli Kaasumenikku"	Baburaj

== Release and reception ==
This was one of the early films in Malayalam cinema that was issued an "A" (adults only) certificate by the CBFC.
