= Savitri (actress) =

Indian actress and filmmaker (1934–1981)

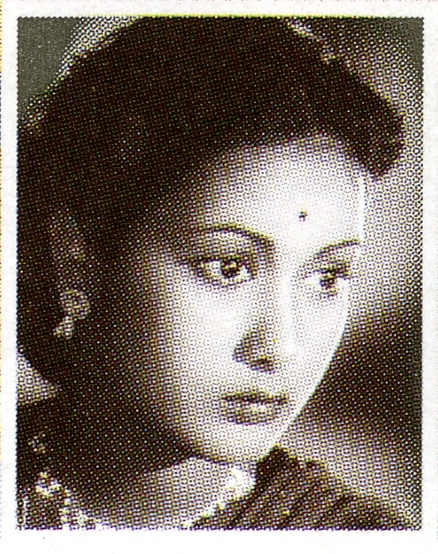
- Savitri portrait on 2011 stamp
- Born: Savitri; 6 December 1934; Chiravuru, Madras Presidency, British India (present-day Andhra Pradesh, India)
- Died: 26 December 1981 (aged 47); Madras, Tamil Nadu, India
- Other names: Mahanati Savitri; Nadigaiyar Thilagam
- Occupations: Actress; Playback singer; Filmmaker
- Years active: 1951–1981
- Works: Full list
- Spouse: Gemini Ganesan (m. 1952)
- Children: 2
- Awards: Kalaimamani

Nissankara Savitri (also known as Savitri Ganesan; 6 December 1934 (Note: Savitri's birth date is misrecorded at many places as 4 January 1936. V. R. Murthy and V. Soma Raju in their book A Legendary Actress: Mahanati Savitri have determined the exact birth date as 6 December 1934 after extensive research.) – 26 December 1981) was an Indian actress and filmmaker who predominantly worked in Telugu and Tamil films. Regarded as one of the greatest actresses in the history of Indian cinema, she was popularly known by the epithets Mahanati (transl. The great actress) in Telugu, and Nadigaiyar Thilagam (transl. The pride of all actresses) in Tamil. Savitri was among the highest-paid in South Indian cinema during the 1950s and 1960s and was known as the "Queen of Telugu cinema".

In a career spanning three decades, Savitri appeared in more than 250 films. Her first significant role was in the 1952 film Pelli Chesi Choodu. Later, she starred in several critically acclaimed and commercially successful films, including Devadasu (1953), Missamma (1955), Ardhangi (1955), Donga Ramudu (1955), Thodi Kodallu (1957), Mayabazar (1957), Mangalya Balam (1959), Aradhana (1962), Gundamma Katha (1962), Nartanasala (1963), Doctor Chakravarty (1964), Sumangali (1965), and Devata (1965).

Savitri was also known for her philanthropic work and generosity towards the poor. In recognition of her contributions to Indian cinema, she received the "A Moon Among Stars" honor at the 30th International Film Festival of India in 1999. Her life and career were later depicted in the biographical film Mahanati (2018), which won the "Equality in Cinema Award" at the Indian Film Festival of Melbourne.

== Early life ==
Savitri was born on 6 December 1934 into a Telugu family in Chirravuru, Guntur district of present-day Andhra Pradesh. Her parents were Nissankara Subhadramma and Guravayya, both of whom belonged to the Kapu caste. Her father died when she was six months old, after which her mother took Savitri and an older sibling, Maruti, to live with an aunt and uncle. Her uncle, Kommareddy Venkataramaiah, enrolled her in classes when she began to show a talent for dance.

She was named for the expression of her eyes during dramas. She participated in many dramas, including one for which she was rewarded with a garland by the famous actor Prithviraj Kapoor. She, along with her uncle, went to the Vijaya Vauhini studio in Madras to enrol Savitri as a character in a movie, though they refused to do so. Not giving up, they tried once again, in another cinema, where she managed to get a role, but could not stand it as she hesitated in reciting dialogues because she was in awe when talking to the hero.

It was then that she met Ramaswamy Ganesan, also known as Gemini Ganesan, who took pictures of Savitri and instructed the duo to come back after two months. A dejected Savitri went back to her village and continued playing dramas. One day, a man came to their home and asked Savitri to play a role for his cinema. Savitri's career thus began. Savitri married Tamil actor Gemini Ganesan in 1952, having first met him in 1948. The marriage led to a permanent rift with her uncle because Ganesan was already married, had four daughters, and was involved in an affair with Pushpavalli. Her marriage became public when she signed a photograph as Savitri Ganesh. Ganesan admitted that while married to his wife Savitri, with whom he had a daughter and a son, he also had two daughters with Pushpavalli, including the actress Rekha.

== Career ==
=== 1949-1951: Initial rejections and rise ===
Savitri acted in dance dramas as a child, including some work with a theatre company run by Jaggayya. In 1949, she gave a screen test for the film Agni Pariksha but was rejected for looking too young. However, in the following year, she was cast as the female lead in Samsaram (1950). That role did not become a reality because she became too excited, necessitating numerous retakes and eventually her replacement in the part. She was given a minor speaking role in the film and in the next year had two more minor roles, in Roopavati and Pathala Bhairavi (both in 1951), before getting her big break as the second heroine in Pelli Chesi Choodu (1952).

=== 1952-56: Meteoric Rise ===
She, later on, was propelled to stardom with critically acclaimed roles in Devadasu, where she perfected the role of Parvati (Paro), one of the earliest depictions of the character alongside Akkineni Nageshwara Rao, with whom she would perform in over 30 films (1953), and Missamma (1955), as Miss Mary where she replaced actress Bhanumati . She also made a breakthrough in the Tamil Film Industry with the comedy Manam Polu Mangalyam (1953), alongside Gemini Ganesan.

Director P. Chandrasekhara Reddy who directed Savitri says, "there is none who can equal her beauty and talent. She didn't heed anyone's advice and got married very early. I remember she was so addicted to drinking even on the sets; she threw up on my shirt during a shoot. The next day she got a brand new shirt for me. She was a generous woman." Savitri also worked in Bollywood films, although she did not find much success. She also acted in three Malayalam films notably Chuzhi (1973).

=== 1956-70: Golden Era and status of "Mahanati" ===
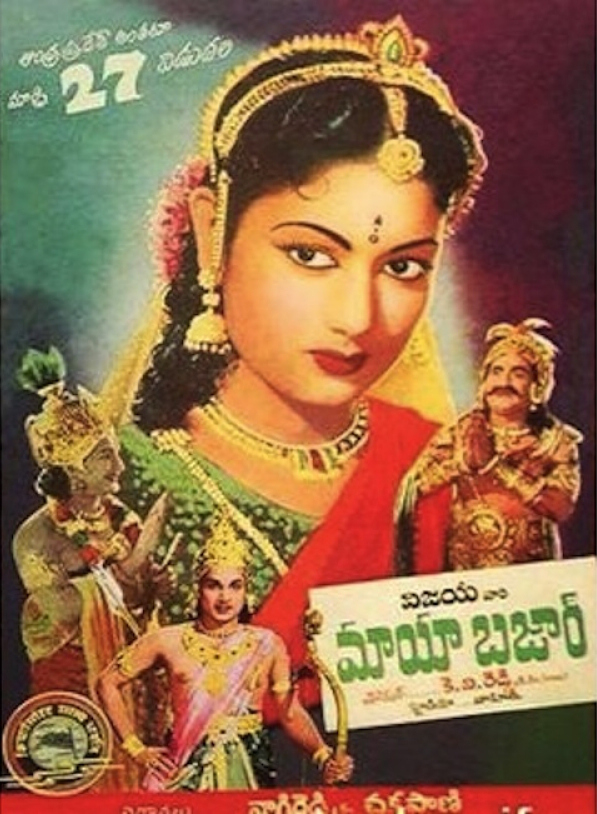
Poster of Mayabazaar

Her performance in the 1957 film Mayabazar skyrocketed her to stardom. In the film, she plays Sasirekha, the daughter of Balarama and Revathi. At the Telugu Film Industry Vajrotsavam(2007), ANR praised Savitri as 'another hero, who is not a man'. Her seamless mimicry of S.V. Ranga Rao's gestures and expressions made her a household name. She later went on to become the highest-paid and most sought-after South-Indian actress of her generation. Savitri was known for her hospitality, philanthropic gestures, and love of buying property and jewellery, but she kept little control of her spending. Ganesan continued to philander and she was susceptible to favouring hangers-on with her largesse. In 1960, she received special mention from Rashtrapathi for her performance in the Telugu film Chivaraku Migiledi, in which she played the role of a nurse suffering from psychological trauma. In 1962, Savitri starred in Gundamma Katha alongside N.T.Rama Rao, ANR, Jamuna and Suryakantham. In 1963, she starred in Nartanasala (1963) as Draupadi, which featured at the Afro-Asian Film Festival in Jakarta. In 1968, she produced and directed the Telugu film Chinnari Papalu, for which she received the state Nandi Award for Best Feature Film(Silver).

Savitri directed movies in both Telugu and Tamil including Matru Devata (1969) and Kuzhandhai Ullam (1969). Savitri also left a mark in Bollywood, starring in movies like Ghar Basake Dekho (1963) and Bahut Din Huwe (1954), showing her versatility across linguistic barriers.

=== 1970-83: Financial Turbulences, Late Career and Decline ===
Her career took a downturn in the late 1960s. Her properties were seized by tax officials in the 1970s and she turned to act in any film in her later years, while sycophants encouraged her to direct and produce films that were unsuccessful and financially draining. Among her few supporters during her financial troubles was Dasari Narayana Rao, who cast her in most of his films, such as Gorintaku (1979), and made the film Devadasu Malli Puttadu (1978) specifically for her.

Savitri was also one of the top Tamil actresses of her era. She acted with major stalwarts, such as M.G.R, Sivaji Ganesan and mostly with her husband Gemini Ganesan. Her notable Tamil works include Kalathur Kannamma (1959), Pasamalar (1961), Pava Mannippu (1961), Paarthal Pasi Theerum (1962), Karpagam (1963), Karnan (1963), Kai Koduttha Dheivam, Navarathri (1964) and Thiruvilaiyadal (1965).

In 1958 Savitri was booked by M. G. Ramachandran for his second directorial venture Ponniyin Selvan. One of the first screen adaptations of Kalki Krishnamurthy's Ponniyin Selvan, the film had a huge ensemble cast consisting of Vyjayanthimala, Padmini, Gemini Ganesan, Saroja Devi, M. N. Rajam and Nagesh. In the film, she was given the role of Poonguzhali and the wife of Senthan Amuthan. However, in mid-1958 the film was shelved for unknown reasons.

== Personal life ==
Savitri married Tamil actor Gemini Ganesan in 1952, having first met him in 1948. The marriage led to a permanent rift with her uncle because Ganesan was already married, had four daughters, and was involved in an affair with Pushpavalli. Her marriage became public when she signed a photograph as Savitri Ganesh. Ganesan admitted that while married to his wife Savitri, with whom he had a daughter and a son, he also had two daughters with Pushpavalli. Savitri and Ganesan separated in 1981. The couple had a daughter, Vijaya Chamundeswari, and Ganesan's only son, Satheesh Kumar. Chamundeswari has a son Abhinay Vaddi, who acted in Ramanujan (2014), and is therefore her grandson.

== Illness and Death ==
In the late 1960s, Savitri's marriage crumbled under the weight of Gemini Ganesan's continued extra-marital affairs. Due to isolation and financial decline, Savitri turned to alcohol for comfort. Between 1972-73, her health started to rapidly deteriorate due to rising diabetes and blood pressure.Prior to May 1980, Savitri managed to quit drinking for a brief period. But on 10 May 1980, whilst staying at Hotel Chalukya in Bangalore, she received a stressful court notice regarding her remaining tax liabilities. Distressed by the notice, she relapsed and drank a significant amount of gin. Crucially, she administered her standard insulin injection for her diabetes but went to sleep without eating any food. She was initially taken to Lady Curzon Hospital in Bangalore before being moved back to her home in Chennai, where she remained completely emaciated and bedridden.

After spending 19 months in a continuous vegetative state, her vital organs finally failed. She died from medical complications on December 26, 1981, at the age of 47.

== Legacy ==
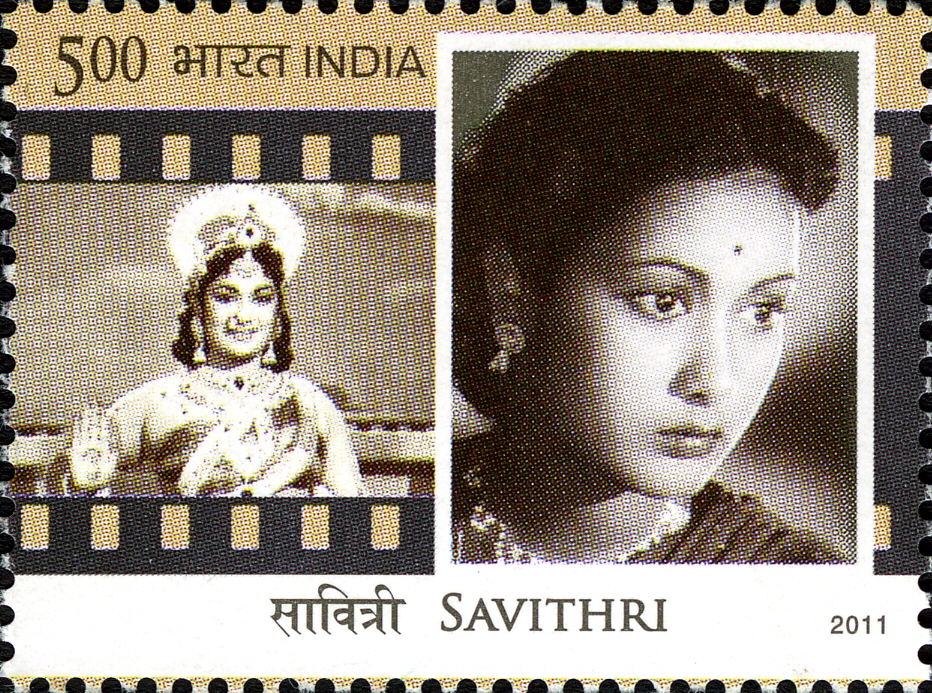
Savitri on a 2011 stamp of India

Rishika Sadam of The Print noted, "Savitri is fondly remembered as a stubborn, determined, could effortlessly get under the skin of any role, chirpy, and a renowned philanthropist." She added, "At a time when scripts, shoots were planned keeping only the male stars in mind, Savitri’s performances, her expressions, and her beauty forced writers and directors to think otherwise. She rose to become an ‘evergreen’ star in male-dominated entertainment industry."

In 2011, the Government of India issued a 5-rupee postage stamp bearing Savitri's face, in her commemoration. The Savitri Kalapeetham Awards were established by the Mahanati Savitri Sahitya Samskrutika Kalapeetham to honour excellence by classical dancers, artists and media technicians in her name. Following her death, persistent demands have been led by veteran film critics and regional figures urging state governments to permanently name a specific Nandi Award category after her. Due to her financial decline, much of her costumes did not survive. But various fashion designers made conscious efforts to preserve her costumes in various films, including the Kanjeevaram Silk Sarees she popularised

== In popular culture ==
- In 2018, Savitri's biopic, titled Mahanati, with actress Keerthy Suresh as Savitri was released to critical acclaim and commercial success.
- In the 2019, N.T.R.'s biopic NTR: Kathanayakudu, had actress Nithya Menen portraying Savitri onscreen.

== Awards ==
- 1968: Received title of Kalaimamani Award by the Government of Tamil Nadu, which is the highest state honour in the field of Arts
