= Afro-Asian Film Festival =

Film festival held in 1958, 1960, and 1964

- Location: Tashkent; Cairo; Jakarta
- Founded: 1958
- Founded by: Afro-Asian People's Solidarity Organisation
- Language: International

The Afro-Asian Film Festival (AAFF) was an international film festival which was held in Tashkent, Cairo, and Jakarta during 1958, 1960, and 1964, respectively. The first Afro-Asian Film Festival took place in Tashkent, Uzbekistan in 1958. A total of 14 Asian and African countries participated, along with eight other Soviet Asian nations.

== History ==
The Afro-Asian cinematic exchange took off during the 1955 Afro-Asian Conference in Bandung, Indonesia. During that time large number of film industries in Japan, India, and Egypt took over other national cinemas in the region. Most of the African territories had no independent regional film industries. The official festival communique was announced in accordance with the "principles of the Bandung Conference" and "under the sign of peace and friendship among peoples".

The second edition was held in Cairo in 1960, it was organised by the ministry of culture in the framework of the Afro-Asian People's Solidarity Organisation (AAPSO) and was the first ever international film festival in the city. After two more editions in Cairo and Jakarta the Afro-Asian festival officially ended in 1964 due to political differences.

In 2025, the retrospective exhibition "Through Cinema We Shall Rise!" of the AAFF was held during the 54th International Film Festival Rotterdam (IFFR). The program marked the 70th anniversary of the historic 1955 Bandung Conference, which inspired the original Afro-Asian Film Festivals.

== Competitive Awards 1958, Tashkent ==
- Best Film
- Best Actor
- Best Actress
- Best Music Direction
- Best Art Direction
- Best Documentary Film

== Competitive Awards 1960, Cairo ==
- Best Film
- Best Actor – Sivaji Ganesan for Veerapandiya Kattabomman (Dir. B. Ramakrishnaiah Panthulu, 1959)
- Best Actress
- Best Music Direction
- Best Art Direction
- Best Documentary Film

== Competitive Awards 1964, Jakarta ==
- Best Film – The Open Door / El bab el maftuh (Dir. Henry Barakat, Egypt, 1963)
- Best Actor – S. V. Ranga Rao for Nartanasala / The Dance Pavilion (Dir. Kamalakara Kameswara Rao, India, 1963)
- Best Actress – Faten Hamamah for The Open Door / El bab el maftuh (Dir. Henry Barakat, Egypt, 1963)
- Best Music Direction
- Best Art Direction – T.V.S Sarma for Nartanasala / The Dance Pavilion (Dir. Kamalakara Kameswara Rao, India, 1963)
- Best Documentary Film

== Revival Edition 2021, Tashkent ==
- New Generation – NOH Men / 能面 (Dir. Kimi Meguro, Japan and Spain, 2021)
- Under-35 Filmmaking Program – Pueblo / The Return to Dreams / Düşlere Dönüş / Orzuga Qaytish (Dir. Kimi Meguro, Uzbekistan, Spain, France, Argentina, Türkiye and Japan, 2023)
