= Chinnari Papalu =

1968 film directed by Savitri

- Theatrical release poster
- Directed by: Savitri
- Written by: Veeramachaneni Sarojini
- Produced by: Veeramachaneni Sarojini
- Starring: Jaggayya; Sowcar Janaki; Jamuna
- Cinematography: Singh; Sekhar
- Edited by: M. S. N. Murthy
- Music by: P. Leela
- Production company: Sri Mata Pictures
- Release date: 21 June 1968
- Country: India
- Language: Telugu

Chinnari Papalu (transl. Very Young Babies) is a 1968 Indian Telugu-language drama film produced and written by Veeramachaneni Sarojini, and directed by Savitri. The film stars Jaggayya, Sowcar Janaki and Jamuna. It revolves around a rich man falling in love with a tribal girl, and how the pair face challenges in life when they separate.

Chinnari Papalu was the inaugural production of Sri Mata Pictures, and Savitri's directorial debut. Its crew consisted largely of women: director Savitri, producer-writer Sarojini, music director P. Leela, art director Mohana and dance choreographer Rajasulochana, but cinematographers Singh and Sekhar, and editor M. S. N. Murthy were exceptions.

Chinnari Papalu was released on 21 June 1968 and despite failing commercially, received critical acclaim and won the Nandi Award for Second Best Feature Film - Silver produced by Matha Pictures. It was remade by Savitri in Tamil as Kuzhandai Ullam (1969).

== Plot ==
Mahesh, a wealthy man, per chance meets a tribal girl, Garika, in a forest, and is smitten by her and they share intimate time together. After learning of his mother's illness, he leaves the forest, but promises Garika he will marry her upon returning. But his mother fixes his marriage with a woman named Parvathi. Mahesh tells his mother about the promise he made to Garika. When he returns to the forest, he finds the entire hamlet has been washed away due to floods and is informed that Garika died. Distraught, he returns home and marries Parvathi. Unknown to Mahesh, Garika has survived and she gives birth to Mahesh's son Nagaraju. Parvathi gives birth to a daughter named Nandini. Garika comes to the city in search of Mahesh and meets Parvathi, who tells her not to disturb her family life. Garika dies the same day and Nagaraju is put in Mahesh's care, much to Parvathi's dislike. But when Nagaraju battles for his life after saving Nandini, she repents and prays for him. The gardener tells Mahesh that Nagaraju is his son.

== Cast ==
- Jaggayya as Mahesh
- Sowcar Janaki as Parvathi
- Jamuna as Garika
- Santha Kumari as Mahesh's mother
- Roja Ramani as Nagaraju
- Santhikala as Nandini
- S. V. Ranga Rao as the gardener
- Savitri as the doctor

== Production ==
In the 1960s, women of the Telugu film industry used to meet frequently on festive occasions or simply for get-togethers. During one such meeting, director V. Madhusudhana Rao's wife Veeramachaneni Sarojini suggested they make a film with an all-women team. This suggestion was met with instant support from the other members. It was decided to approach actress Savitri to be the director. Sarojini met Savitri and revealed the idea of an all-women production. Savitri was hesitant to accept the offer of turning director, but after consulting her husband Gemini Ganesan who encouraged her to accept Sarojini's offer, she promptly did so, making her directorial debut. Shortly thereafter the production company Sri Mata Pictures was established and its inaugural production Chinnari Papalu was launched. Besides producing, Sarojini also wrote the film's story. Rajasulochana was assigned as the dance choreographer, P. Leela as the music director, and Mohana as the art director. Despite Sarojini's initial desire to make the film an all-women production, some of the crew were men: Mullapudi Venkata Ramana who wrote the dialogues alongside Sarojini, Singh and Sekhar who handled the cinematography, and M. S. N. Murthy who was the editor. Principal photography began on 12 October 1967 at Vauhini Studios. Though Savitri was initially signed on only to direct the film, she soon found herself having to manage its financial matters.

== Soundtrack ==
No.	Title	Performer(s)	Length
1.	"Uyyala Uyala"
2.	"Oyabbo Emdi Chinnari Papalu"	P. Susheela
3.	"E kKommaku Poocheno E Gaaliki Veecheno"	P. Susheela

== Release and reception ==
Chinnari Papalu was released on 21 June 1968. The Indian Express wrote, "Jamuna is comely as the "wild" heroine. But it is Sowcar Janaki, Jaggaiah and S. V. Ranga Rao, who impress with intense performances. These few scenes, with reactions flying between the three, are the life of the film." Although the film became a box-office bomb since it failed to recover even one fourth of its investment, it received critical acclaim and won the Nandi Award for Second Best Feature Film in 1968. The film was later remade in Tamil as Kuzhandai Ullam (1969) with Savitri returning as director.

== Awards ==
- Nandi Award for Second Best Feature Film - Silver won by Matha Pictures (1968)
