= List of films scored by Ilaiyaraaja in the 2020s =

This article lists the films composed by Ilaiyaraaja in the 2020s.

== 2020 ==
| Date | Language | Film | Director | Dubbed | Notes |
|---|---|---|---|---|---|
| 24 January | Tamil | Psycho | Mysskin | | |
| 25 March | Sanskrit | Punyakoti | Ravishankar Venkateswaran | | 1st biggest crowd-funded movie |

== 2021 ==
| Date | Language | Film | Director | Dubbed | Notes |
|---|---|---|---|---|---|
| 26 November | Tamil | Sivaranjiniyum Innum Sila Pengalum | Vasanth S Sai | | |
| 10 December | Telugu | Gamanam | Sujana Rao | | |
| 31 December | Tamil | Madurai Manikuravan | Raja Rishi | | |

== 2022 ==
| Date | Language | Film | Director | Dubbed | Notes |
|---|---|---|---|---|---|
| 21 January | Tamil | Marutha | GRS | | |
| 11 February | Tamil | Kadaisi Vivasayi | M. Manikandan | | Ilaiyaraaja's songs and BGM were unused. |
| 18 February | Telugu | Son of India | Diamond Ratnababu | | |
| 11 March | Tamil / Telugu | Clap | Prithivi Adithya | | |
| 6 May | Tamil | Akka Kuruvi | Samy | | |
| 27 May | Kannada | Preethsu | K. Ganeshan | Dubbed version of Tamil original titled Kadhal Sei | |
| 24 June | Tamil | Maayon | N Kishore | Dubbed version in Telugu | |
| 24 June | Tamil | Maamanithan | Seenu Ramasamy | | |

== 2023 ==
| Date | Language | Film | Director | Dubbed | Notes |
|---|---|---|---|---|---|
| 22 March | Telugu | Rangamarthanda | Krishna Vamsi | | Remake of Natsamrat Marks the 2nd collaboration of Ilaiyaraaja and Ranjani–Gayatri |
| 31 March | Tamil | Viduthalai Part 1 | Vetrimaaran | Dubbed version to Vidudala in Telugu; also lyricist for one song | |
| 22 April | Tamil | Thamezharasan | Babu Yogeswaran | Dubbed version to Telugu as Vikram Rathod | |
| 12 May | Telugu | Custody | Venkat Prabhu | | 2nd collaboration of Ilaiyaraaja with Yuvan after Maamanithan; soundtrack only |
| 12 May | Tamil | Custody | Venkat Prabhu | | |
| 12 May | Telugu, Hindi | Music School | Papa Rao Biyyala | Tamil dubbed version | Songs and BGM recorded in Budapest Philharmonic Orchestra |
| 18 May | Tamil | Modern Love Chennai | Akshay Sundher, Bharathiraja, Thiagarajan Kumararaja | | Webseries - Margazhi, Paravai Kootil Vaazhum Maangal, Ninaivo Oru Paravai |
| 14 July | Tamil | Atman | Hariharan Raju | | Musical Short Film released on ShortFlix |
| 22 September | Tamil | Are You Ok Baby? | Lakshmy Ramakrishnan | | |
| 22 September | Tamil | Ulagammai | V. Jayaprakash | | |
| 29 September | English | Let's Go Below The Rainbow | Julian Karikalan | | Amazon Prime TVOD (UK, US) |
| 27 October | Tamil | Margazhi Thingal | Manoj Bharathiraja | | |
| 29 December | Tamil | Vattara Vazhakku | Kannusamy Rajendran | | |

== 2024 ==
| Date | Language | Film | Director | Dubbed | Notes |
|---|---|---|---|---|---|
| 23 February | Tamil | Ninaivellam Neeyada | Aadhiraajan | | 1417th movie |
| 23 March | Hindi, Tamil | The Silent Prayer | Senthil Vinu | | Released on PalampurFlix |
| 23 May | Tamil | Saamaniyan | Rahesh | | |
| 2 August | Tamil | Jama | Pari Elavazhagan | | |
| 20 December | Tamil | Viduthalai Part 2 | Vetrimaaran | | |

== 2025 ==
| Date | Language | Film | Director | Dubbed | Notes |
|---|---|---|---|---|---|
| 21 January | Tamil | Kaikuttai Rani | Devayani | | Short film |
| 14 February | Tamil | Dinasari | G Sankar | | |
| 23 May | Tamil | School | R. K. Vidyadharan | | |
| 30 May | Telugu | Shashtipoorthi | Pavan Prabha | | |
| 5 June | Tamil | Peranbum Perungobamum | S. Sivaprakash | | |
| 13 June | Tamil | Padai Thalaivan | U Anbu | | |
| 27 June | Tamil | Thirukkural | A.J. Balakrishnan | | |
| 30 October | Tamil | Desiya Thalaivar | R. Aravindraj | | |
| 14 November | Marathi | Gondhal | Santosh Davakhar | | |

== 2026 ==
| Date | Language | Film | Director | Dubbed | Notes |
|---|---|---|---|---|---|
| 13 February | Tamil | Mylanji | Ajayan Bala | | |
| 13 March | Tamil | Antony | Sukirthan Christhuraja, Jenosan Rajeswar | | |
| 29 May | Telugu | Mareechika | Satish Kasetty | | |
| 25 September | Tamil | Dorothy | Karthik Subbaraj | | |
| 25 September | Tamil | Lenin Pandiyan | D. D. Balachandran | | |

== Decade-wise statistics ==
| Ilaiyaraaja 1970's | Ilaiyaraaja 1980's | Ilaiyaraaja 1990's | Ilaiyaraaja 2000's | Ilaiyaraaja 2010's | New |
