= List of films scored by Ilaiyaraaja in the 1980s =

This page lists the films composed by Ilaiyaraaja in the 1980s.

== 1980 ==
Date	Language	Film	Director	Dubbed	Notes
	Tamil	Orey Muththam	C.A.Mugilan		
	Tamil	Soolam	M.Bhaskar		
	Tamil	Aayiram Vaasal Idhayam	A. Jagannathan		
	Tamil	Ellam Un Kairasi	M.A. Thirumugam		
	Tamil	Gramathu Athiyayam	C. Rudhraiya		
	Tamil	Idhayaththil Ore Idam	Prasath		
	Tamil	Kannil Theriyum Kathaikal	Devaraj Mohan		Ilaiyaraaja composed 1 song, Naan Oru Ponnoviyam Kanden. The remaining songs were each composed by 4 other composers, Shankar–Ganesh, K. V. Mahadevan, G. K. Venkatesh and T. R. Pappa. The background score was composed by Ilaiyaraaja.
	Tamil	Nadhiyai Thedi Vandha Kadal	B. Lenin		
	Tamil	Rishi Moolam	S. P. Muthuraman		
	Tamil	Thai Pongal	M. G. Vallabhan		
	Tamil	Anbukku Naan Adimai	R. Thiyagarajan		
	Tamil	Adhigaram	Swarnamurthy	Unreleased film	Jai Ganesh/Prameela/Srikanth/Sowcar janaki
	Malayalam	Dooram Arike	Jeassy		
	Tamil; Telugu	Guru	I. V. Sasi		
	Tamil	Ilamai Kolam	N. Venkatesh		
	Kannada	Janma Janmada Anubandha	Shankar Nag		
	Tamil	Johnny	Mahendran	Naa pere Johnny(Telugu)	
	Tamil	Kallukkul Eeram	P. S. Nivas		
	Telugu	Kotha Jeevithalu	Bharathiraja		
	Telugu	Mayadari Krishnudu	R. Thiyagarajan		Bilingual. Telugu version of Anbukku Naan Adimai
	Tamil	Moodu Pani	Balu Mahendra		100th Film. The first film with filmmaker Balu Mahendra, heralding a legendary collaboration.
	Tamil	Murattu Kaalai	S. P. Muthuraman		
	Tamil	Nizhalgal	Bharathiraja		Winner, Tamil Nadu State Film Award for Best Music Director
	Telugu	Pasidi Moggalu	Durga Nageswara Rao		Telugu remake of Uthiri Pookkal
	Tamil	Rusi Kanda Poonai	G. N. Rangarajan		
	Tamil	Ullasa Paravaigal	C. V. Rajendran	Pichchi Prema(Telugu)	
	Tamil	Puthiya Adimaigal	R.Selvaraj		Film went unreleased.
	Tamil	Karumbu Vil	Vijay		
	Tamil	Poottaatha Poottukkal	Mahendran		
	Tamil	Naan Potta Savaal	Puratshidasan		
19 September	Telugu	Kaali	I.V. Sasi		
12 December	Tamil	Nenjathai Killathe	Mahendran	Mouna Geetham(Telugu)	

== 1981 ==
Date	Language	Film	Director	Dubbed	Notes
	Tamil	Garjanai	C. V. Rajendran		
	Malayalam	Garjanam	C. V. Rajendran		
	Kannada	Garjane	C. V. Rajendran		Trilingual. The Kannada version of the Tamil Garjanai and Malayalam Garjanam.
	Tamil	Vidiyum Varai Kaathiru	K. Bhagyaraj		
	Tamil	sanditthanam	Sobanan		srilanka movie
	Telugu	Kaala Rathri	P.C. Reddy		Bilingual. Telugu version of the Tamil film, Oru Iravu Oru Paravai.
	Tamil	Raja Paarvai	Singeetam Srinivasa Rao	Amavasya Chandrudu (Telugu)	
	Tamil	Kannitheevu	Ramana		
	Tamil	Pattanam Pogalaam Vaa	Sakthi Subramaniam		
	Tamil	Sankarlal	T.N. Balu	Andagaadu(Telugu)	Only 1 song, Ilankiliye, composed by Ilaiyaraaja. Remaining songs composed by Gangai Amaran.
	Telugu	Chinnari Chitti Babu	N. Gopalakrishna		
	Tamil	Arathanai	Prasad		
	Tamil	Bala Nagamma	K. Shankar		
	Telugu	Bala Nagamma	K. Shankar		Bilingual. Telugu version of the Tamil Bala Nagamma.
	Tamil	Enakkaga Kaathiru	P. S. Nivas	Mondi Jagamondi Dubbed to Telugu	
	Tamil	Indru Poi Naalai Vaa	K. Bhagyaraj		
	Tamil	Kadal Meengal	G. N. Rangarajan		
	Tamil	Karaiyellam Shenbagapoo	G. N. Rangarajan		
	Tamil	Nalladhu Nadandhe Theerum	Karaikudi Narayanan		
	Tamil	Nandu	Mahendran		
	Tamil	Oomai Ullangal	?		Film went unreleased.
	Tamil	Panchami	Peter Selvakumar		Film went unreleased.
	Kannada	Geetha	Shankar Nag		
	Kannada	Nee Nanna Gellalare	Vijay		Only film with Dr.Rajkumar
	Tamil	Tik Tik Tik	Bharathiraja	Tik Tik Tik (Telugu)	
	Tamil	Ellam Inba Mayyam	G. N. Rangarajan		
	Tamil	Netrikkan	S. P. Muthuraman	Musalodiki Dasara Pandaga (Telugu)	
	Telugu	Seethakoka Chiluka	Bharathiraja		Winner, Nandi Award for Best Music Director. Film is a remake of the Tamil hit, Alaigal Oyvadhillai.
	Tamil	Panneer Pushpangal	Santhana Bharathi, P. Vasu	Madhura Geetham (Telugu), Panneer Pookkal (Malayalam)	
	Tamil	Alaigal Oivathillai	Bharathiraja		Winner, Tamil Nadu State Film Award for Best Music Director
	Tamil	Ram Lakshman	R. Thiyagarajan	Rama Lakshmanulu (Telugu)	
	Kannada	Shikari	C. R. Simha		
14 January	Tamil	Meendum Kokila	G. N. Rangarajan	Chilipi Mogudu (Telugu )	
	Tamil	Koyil Puraa	K. Vijayan		
	Tamil	Kazhugu (1981 film)	S. P. Muthuraman		
	Kannada	Bhaari Bharjari Bete	Rajendra Singh Babu		

== 1982 ==
Date	Language	Film	Director	Dubbed	Notes
26 February	Tamil	Payanangal Mudivathillai	R. Sundarrajan		
25 January	Malayalam	Olangal	Balu Mahendra		
	Telugu	Andhagadu	T.N. Balu		Bilingual. Telugu version of the Tamil film, Sankarlal. Only 1 song, Puduguthanam, composed by Ilaiyaraaja. Remaining songs and BGM done by Gangai Amaran.
	Tamil	Eera Vizhi Kaaviyangal	B. R. Ravishankar		
26 June	Tamil	Thai Moogambikai	K. Shankar		
14 April	Tamil	Thooral Ninnu Pochchu	K. Bhagyaraj		
14 November	Tamil	Valibamey Vaa Vaa	Bharathiraja		
19 February	Tamil	Moondram Pirai	Balu Mahendra		
14 August	Tamil	Sakalakala Vallavan	S. P. Muthuraman		
15 October	Tamil	Gopurangal Saivathillai	Manivannan		
14 August	Tamil	Kanne Radha	Rama Narayanan		200th Film
	Tamil	Kavidhai Malar	Devaraj Mohan		Film went unreleased.
7 May	Tamil	Kelviyum Naane Pathilum Naane	N. Murugesh		
25 December	Tamil	Kozhi Koovuthu	Gangai Amaran		
24 February	Tamil	Magane Magane	K.N. Lakshmanan		
August	Tamil	Manjal Nila	Ranjith Rangarajan		
14 November	Tamil	Nizhal Thedum Nenjangal	P. S. Nivas		
11 June	Tamil	Pudukavithai	S. P. Muthuraman		
9 October	Tamil	Rani Theni	G. N. Rangarajan		
5 August	Malayalam	Alolam	Mohan		
15 July	Tamil	Ninaivellam Nithya	C. V. Sridhar	Prema Sangamam (Telugu)	
	Telugu	Poola Pallaki	C. Hemachandra Rao		
14 January	Tamil	Anandha Ragam	Bharani		
	Tamil	Archanai Pookal	Gokulakrishna		
27 March	Tamil	Auto Raja	K. Vijayan		Only 1 Song.
	Tamil	Echchil Iravugal	A.S. Prakasam		
	Tamil	Metti	Mahendran		
12 March	Tamil	Thanikattu Raja	V. C. Guhanathan		
17 December	Tamil	Agaya Gangai	Manobala		
	Tamil	Azhagiya Kanne	Mahendran		
14 August	Tamil	Enkeyo Ketta Kural	S. P. Muthuraman		
	Tamil	Ethanai Konam Ethanai Parvai	B. Lenin		Film went unreleased.
30 April	Tamil	Kaadhal Oviyam	Bharathiraja	Ragamalika (Telugu)	

== 1983 ==
Date	Language	Film	Director	Dubbed	Notes
	Tamil	Aanandha Kummi	Balakrishnan		
	Tamil	Oppandham	Vijaya Ganesh		
	Tamil	Urangatha Ninaivugal	R. Baskaran		
	Malayalam	Aa Raathri	Joshiy		
	Tamil	Jothi	Manivannan		
	Tamil	Man Vasanai	Bharathiraja		
	Tamil	Paayum Puli	S. P. Muthuraman		
	Telugu	Abhilasha	A. Kodandarami Reddy		
	Tamil	Inimai Idho Idho	R. Ramalingam		
	Malayalam	Sandhyakku Virinja Poovu	P. G. Viswambharan		
	Tamil	Indru Nee Nalai Naan	Major Sundarrajan		
	Tamil	Mundhanai Mudichu	K. Bhagyaraj	Vaddante Pelli (Telugu)	
	Telugu	Manthrigari Viyyankudu	Bapu		Only collaboration with Bapu
	Malayalam	Oomakkuyil	Balu Mahendra		Remake of Balu Mahendra's debut film, the Kannada Kokila
	Kannada	Pallavi Anupallavi	Mani Ratnam	Priya Oh Priya (Tamil)	
	Malayalam	Pinnilavu	P. G. Viswambharan		
	Tamil	Aayiram Nilave Vaa	A.S. Prakasam		
	Tamil	Bhagavathipuram Railway Gate	R. Selvaraj		
	Tamil	Adutha Varisu	S. P. Muthuraman		
	Tamil	Ennai Paar En Azhagai Paar	N.S. Maniam		
	Tamil	Kann Sivanthaal Mann Sivakkum	Sreedhar Rajan		
	Tamil	Malaiyoor Mambattiyan	Rajasekhar		
	Tamil	Malargal Nanaigindrana	S. Chidambaram		
	Tamil	Manaivi Solle Manthiram	Rama Narayanan		
	Tamil	Mella Pesungal	Bharathi Vasu		
	Tamil	Muthu Engal Sothu	G. N. Rangarajan		
	Kannada	Nagara Bayalu	?		Film went unreleased.
	Kannada	Nyaya Gedditu	SM Joe Simon		
	Tamil	Oomai Veyyil	Indhu		Film went unreleased.
	Tamil	Raagangal Maaruvathillai	Sirumugai Ravi		
	Telugu	Rajkumar	G. Raminaidu		
	Tamil	Saattai Illatha Pambaram	N. Murugesh		
	Tamil	Antha Sila Naatkal	Venkat		
	Tamil	Soorakottai Singakutti	Rama Narayanan		
	Tamil	Thanga Magan	A. Jagannathan		
	Tamil	Uyire Unakkaaga	S. Kumar		Film went unreleased. Not to be confused with the 1986 film, Uyire Unakkaga, directed by K. Rangarajan with music composed by Laxmikant-Pyarelal.
	Tamil	Veetula Raman Veliyila Krishnan	Manivannan		
	Telugu	Veerabhadrudu	Ravi Raja		Remake of the Tamil film, Kozhi Koovuthu.
	Tamil	Yuga Dharmam	K.S. Gopalakrishnan		
	Telugu	Saagara Sangamam	K. Viswanath	Salangai Oli (Tamil)	Winner, National Film Award for Best Music Direction
	Tamil	Kokkarakko	Gangai Amaran		
	Tamil	Vellai Roja	A. Jagannathan		
	Hindi	Sadma	Balu Mahendra		Remake of the Tamil superhit, Moondram Pirai.
	Tamil	Oru Odai Nadhiyagirathu	C. V. Sridhar		
	Tamil	Anney Anney	T. S. B. K. Mouli		
4 November	Tamil	Thoongadhey Thambi Thoongadhey	S. P. Muthuraman	Vasantholtsavam (Malayalam)	
	Tamil	Ilamai Kaalangal	Manivannan		

== 1984 ==
Date	Language	Film	Director	Dubbed	Notes
23 March	Tamil	Nooravathu Naal	Manivannan		
	Telugu	Idhe Naa Savaal	Puratchidasan		
	Tamil	Enakkul Oruvan	S. P. Muthuraman		
	Tamil	Devi Sridevi	Gangai Amaran		
	Kannada	Nagara Mahime	Kallesh		
	Kannada	Accident	Shankar Nag		No songs. Only BGM in this film.
	Tamil	Pozhudhu Vidinjaachu	Gangai Amaran		
	Telugu	Sitaara	Vamsy		
	Tamil	Thangamadi Thangam	Rama Narayanan		
	Tamil	Ullam Urugudhadi	N. Murugesh		
	Tamil	Ambigai Neril Vanthaal	Manivannan		
	Tamil	Anbe Odi Vaa	R. Ranjith Kumar		
	Tamil	Anbulla Malare	B.R. Ravishankar		
	Tamil	Anbulla Rajinikanth	K. Natraj	Priyamaina Rajnikanth	
	Tamil	Dhavani Kanavugal	K. Bhagyaraj		
	Tamil	Ezhuthatha Sattangal	K. Shankar		
	Tamil	Ingeyum Oru Gangai	Manivannan		
	Tamil	January 1	Manivannan		
	Tamil	Komberi Mookan	A. Jagannathan		
	Telugu	Kala Rudrudu	Katta Subba Rao		Telugu remake of Komberi Mookan.
	Tamil	Kai Kodukkum Kai	Mahendran		
	Tamil	Kairasikkaran	S.S.K. Shankar		
	Tamil	Kuva Kuva Vaathugal	Manivannan		
	Tamil	Magudi	Chakki		
	Tamil	Naalai Unathu Naal	A. Jagannathan		
14 January 1984	Tamil	Naan Mahaan Alla	S. P. Muthuraman		
	Tamil	Naan Paadum Paadal	R. Sundarrajan		
	Tamil	Nalla Naal	R. Thyagarajan		
	Tamil	Nallavanukku Nallavan	S. P. Muthuraman		
	Tamil	Nee Thodum Bodhu	V.C. Kuganathan		
	Tamil	Neengal Kettavai	Balu Mahendra		
	Tamil	Neram Nalla Neram	N. Sambandham		Not Released
	Tamil	Nerupukkul Eeram	R. Krishnamoorthy		
	Tamil	Nilavu Suduvathillai	K. Rangaraj		
	Tamil	Niyayam	R. Krishnamoorthy		
	Tamil	Oh Maane Maane	A. Jagannathan		
	Tamil	Poovilangu	Amirjan		
	Malayalam	Onnanu Nammal	PG Vishwambharan		
	Tamil	Pudhumai Penn	Bharathiraja		
	Telugu	Sahasame Jeevitham	Vasu Bharathi		
	Tamil	Sanga Natham	Ramineedu		
	Tamil	Thalaiyanai Mandhiram	N. Venkatesh		
	Tamil	Thambikku Entha Ooru	Rajasekhar		
	Tamil	Unnai Naan Santhithen	K. Rangaraj		
	Tamil	Vaazhkai	C. V. Rajendran		
	Tamil	Vaidehi Kathirunthal	R. Sundarrajan		
	Tamil	Vellai Pura Ondru	Gangai Amaran		
	Tamil	24 Mani Neram	Manivannan		
	Malayalam	My Dear Kuttichathan	Jijo Punnoose	India's first 3D film.	
	Telugu	Challenge	A. Kodandarami Reddy		
	Malayalam	Mangalam Nerunnu	Mohan		
	Telugu	Merupu Daadi	N. Ramachandra Rao		
	Malayalam	Unaroo	Mani Ratnam		
	Tamil	Mudivalla Arambam	N.N. Mohideen		

== 1985 ==
Date	Language	Film	Director	Dubbed	Notes
	Telugu	Aalaapana	Vamsy	Salangayil Oru Sangeetham (Tamil)	
	Tamil	Oonjaladum Uravugal	Bharathan		
11 November	Tamil	Chinna Veedu	K. Bhagyaraj		
	Tamil	Puthiya Theerpu	C. V. Rajendran		
	Tamil	Muthal Mariyathai	Bharathiraja		
	Malayalam	Yathra	Balu Mahendra		
	Telugu	Preminchu Pelladu	Vamsy		
	Telugu	Darja Donga	Manivannan		
	Tamil	Sindhu Bhairavi	K. Balachander	Sindhu Bhairavi (Telugu)	Winner, National Film Award for Best Music Direction
	Tamil	En Selvame	S. P. Muthuraman		
	Tamil	Udhaya Geetham	K. Rangaraj		300th Film.
	Tamil	Andha Oru Nimidam	Major Sundarrajan		
	Tamil	Kakki Sattai	Rajasekhar		
	Tamil	Pillai Nila	Manobala		
	Tamil	Meendum Oru Kaathal Kathai	Prathap Pothan		
	Tamil	Alai Osai	Sirumugai Ravi		
	Tamil	Nalla Thambi	S. P. Muthuraman		
	Tamil	Raaja Gopuram	P.G. Pandian		
	Tamil	Aduthathu Albert	G. N. Rangarajan		
	Tamil	Amudha Gaanam	K. Rangaraj		
	Tamil	Anbin Mugavari	Manivannan		
	Telugu	Anveshana	Vamsy		
	Tamil	Aan Paavam	Pandiarajan		
	Tamil	Eetti	Rajasekhar		
	Tamil	Geethanjali	K. Rangaraj		
	Tamil	Hello Yaar Pesurathu	Ramarajan		Music jointly credited to Ilaiyaraaja and Gangai Amaran.
	Tamil	Pagal Nilavu	Mani Ratnam		
	Tamil	Idhaya Kovil	Mani Ratnam		
	Tamil	Japanil Kalyanaraman	S. P. Muthuraman		
	Telugu	Jwala	Ravi Raja Pinisetty		
14 January 1985	Tamil	Oru Kaidhiyin Diary	Bharathiraja	Khaidi Veta (Telugu)	
	Tamil	Kanni Rasi	Pandiarajan		
	Tamil	Ketti Melam	Visu		
	Telugu	Khooni	Manivannan		
	Tamil	Kungumachimizh	R. Sundarrajan		
	Telugu	Mangalya Bandam	Katta Subba Rao		Telugu remake of the Tamil film, Naan Paadum Paadal.
	Tamil	Meendum Parasakthi	A. Jagannathan		
	Tamil	Naan Sigappu Manidhan	S. A. Chandrasekhar		
	Tamil	Naane Raja Naane Mandhiri	Balu Anandh		
	Tamil	Neethiyin Marupakkam	S. A. Chandrasekhar		
	Tamil	Padikkadhavan	Rajasekhar		
	Tamil	Padikkadha Pannaiyar	K. S. Gopalakrishnan		
	Tamil	Raja Rishi	K. Shankar		
	Tamil	Selvi	K. Natraj		
	Telugu	Sri Shirdi Saibaba Mahathyam	K. Vasu	Shirdi Sai Baba Ki Kahani [Hindi] & Sri Shirdi Saibaba Tamil]	
	Tamil	Un Kannil Neer Vazhindal	Balu Mahendra		
	Tamil	Unnai Thedi Varuven	C. V. Sridhar		
	Tamil	Urimai	Rama Narayanan		
	Tamil	Thendrale Ennai Thodu	C. V. Sridhar	Prema Sasthram (Telugu)	
	Tamil	Uyarndha Ullam	S. P. Muthuraman		
	Tamil	Sri Raghavendrar	S. P. Muthuraman		
	Tamil	Poove Poochudava	Fazil		
	Tamil	Annai Bhoomi 3D	R. Thiyagarajan		
	Tamil	Thanga Mama 3D	K. Simon		
	Kannada	Ajeya	S. Siddalingaiah		

== 1986 ==
Date	Language	Film	Director	Dubbed	Notes
	Tamil	Africavil Appu	Vijay Anand		Music credited to both Ilaiyaraaja and Gangai Amaran.
	Tamil	Amman Kovil Kizhakale	R. Sundarrajan		
10 January	Tamil	Saadhanai	A. S. Pragasam		
	Tamil	Aruvadai Naal	G. M. Kumar		
	Tamil	December Pookal	R. Boopathy		
	Tamil	Enakku Nane Needipathi	S. A. Chandrasekhar		
	Tamil	Iravu Pookkal	Sreedhar Rajan		
	Tamil	Isai Paadum Thendral	S. Devaraj		
	Malayalam	Kaveri	Rajeevnath		Jointly composed by Ilaiyaraaja and Dakshinamoorthy Swami
	Tamil	Kadalora Kavithaigal	Bharathiraja		
	Tamil	Kannukku Mai Ezhuthu	Mahendran		
	Tamil	Kodai Mazhai	Muktha S. Sundar		
	Telugu	Ladies Tailor	Vamsy		
	Tamil	Maaveeran	Rajasekhar		
	Telugu	Manchi Manasulu	Mohan Gandhi		Telugu remake of the 1984 Tamil superhit, Vaidehi Kathirunthal. Not to be confused with the 1962 film, Manchi Manasulu.
	Tamil	Manithanin Marupakkam	K. Rangaraj		
	Tamil	Mandhira Punnagai	V. Thamizhazhagan		
	Tamil	Maragatha Veenai	Gokulakrishna		
	Telugu	Mister Bharath	Raja Chandra		Telugu remake of the Tamil hit, Mr. Bharath.
	Tamil	Mouna Ragam	Mani Ratnam	Mouna Ragam (Telugu)	
	Tamil	Muthal Vasantham	Manivannan		
	Tamil	Neethaana Andha Kuyil	R. Selvaraj		
	Telugu	Nireekshana	Balu Mahendra	Kanne Kalaimaane (Tamil)	
	Telugu	Oka Radha Iddaru Krishnulu	A. Kodandarami Reddy	Hare Radha Hare Krishna (Tamil)	
	Tamil	Paalaivana Rojakkal	Manivannan		
	Tamil	Paaru Paaru Pattanam Paaru	Manobala		
	Kannada	Sathya Jyothi	K. Ranga Rao		
	Tamil	Thaaiku Oru Thaalaattu	Balachandra Menon		
	Tamil	Thazhuvatha Kaigal	R. Sundarrajan		
	Tamil	Vidinja Kalyanam	Manivannan		
	Malayalam	Poomukhappadiyil Ninneyum Kaathu	Bhadran		
	Tamil	Puthir	Siddalingaiah		Remake of Siddalingaiah's Kannada film, Ajeya.
	Tamil	Dharma Pathini	Amirjaan		
	Tamil	Kanna Thorakkanum Saami	R. Govindraj		Music credited to Ilaiyaraaja and Gangai Amaran in the film's credits.
	Tamil	Karimedu Karuvayan	Rama Narayanan		
	Tamil	Murattu Karangal	Rajasekhar		
	Tamil	Naanum Oru Thozhilali	C. V. Sridhar		
	Kannada	Sooryodaya	C. V. Sridhar		Remake (Trlingual) of Sridhar's Naanum Oru Thozhilaali
	Telugu	Sooryodayam	C. V. Sridhar		Remake (Trlingual) of Sridhar's Naanum Oru Thozhilaali
	Tamil	Natpu	Amirjaan		
	Telugu	Swathi Muthyam	K. Viswanath		India's official entry for the Best Foreign Language Film at the Academy Awards.
1 November 1986	Tamil	Punnagai Mannan	K. Balachander		
	Tamil	Mella Thirandhathu Kadhavu	R. Sundarrajan		Except "Kuzhaloodhum Kannanukku", all the songs were composed by M. S. Viswanathan and the arrangements, orchestration and background score were done by Ilaiyaraaja.
	Tamil	Unakkaagave Vaazhgiren	K. Rangaraj		
	Telugu	Kirathakudu	A. Kodandarami Reddy		
	Tamil	Vikram	Rajasekhar		
	Telugu	Rakshasudu	A. Kodandarami Reddy		
	Tamil	Mr. Bharath	S. P. Muthuraman	Nene Rajnikanth(Telugu)	

== 1987 ==
Date	Language	Film	Director	Dubbed	Notes
	Tamil	Nayakan	Mani Ratnam	Nayakudu (Telugu); Velu Nayakan (Hindi- Dubbed & released in 1995)	India's Official Submission for the Academy Award for Best Foreign Language Film. In TIME's Top 100 Movies of all time. 400th film.
	Tamil	Aala Piranthavan	A.S. Prakasam		
	Tamil	Jallikattu	Manivannan		
	Tamil	Iniya Uravu Poothathu	C. V. Sridhar		
	Tamil	Kadhal Parisu	A. Jagannathan	Kedi(Telugu)	
	Tamil	Kalyana Kachcheri	Manivannan		
	Tamil	Manaivi Ready	Pandiarajan		
	Tamil	Poovizhi Vasalile	Fazil		
	Tamil	Dhoorathu Pachai	Manobala		
	Tamil	Anand	C. V. Rajendran		
	Tamil	Chinna Kuyil Paaduthu	P. Madhavan		
	Telugu	Andharikante Ghanudu	C. V. Sridhar		
	Tamil	Chinna Thambi Periya Thambi	Manivannan		Ilaiyaraaja is uncredited. But 1 song, Oru Kaadhal Vandhadhu, was composed by him. The remaining songs and BGM were composed by Gangai Amaran. Film credits Gangai Amaran for the score.
	Tamil	Gramatthu Minnal	K. Rangaraj		
	Tamil	Kannukkoru Vannakkili	Ravindhar		Film went unreleased.
	Tamil	Krishnan Vandhaan	K. Vijayan		
	Tamil	Manathil Uruthi Vendum	K. Balachander		
	Tamil	Ninaikka Therindha Maname	Suresh		
	Tamil	Ninaive Oru Sangeetham	K. Rangaraj		
	Tamil	Paadu Nilave	K. Rangaraj		
	Tamil	Puyal Paadum Paattu	Manivannan		
	Tamil	Ullam Kavarndha Kalvan	Ashok Kumar		
	Tamil	Vaazhga Valarga	Vijay Krishna Raj		
	Tamil	Velaikaran	S. P. Muthuraman		
	Telugu	Aradhana	Bharathiraja		Remake of Bharathiraja's Tamil hit, Kadalora Kavithaigal.
	Tamil	Kadamai Kanniyam Kattupaadu	Santhana Bharathi		Film had no songs.
	Tamil	Enga Ooru Pattukaran	Gangai Amaran		
	Tamil	Per Sollum Pillai	S. P. Muthuraman		
	Telugu	Sankeertana	Geetha Krishna		
	Telugu	Maharshi	Vamsy		
	Telugu	Garjinchina Ganga	Kommineni		
	Tamil	Rettai Vaal Kuruvi	Balu Mahendra	Rendu Thokala Pitta (Telugu)	
	Hindi	Kamagni	Ashok Kumar		
	Tamil	Sirai Paravai	Manobala		
	Tamil	Theertha Karaiyinile	Manivannan		

== 1988 ==
Date	Language	Film	Director	Dubbed	Notes
14 January	Tamil	Sathya	Suresh Krissna	Sathya	
30 July	Tamil	Soora Samhaaram	Chitra Lakshmanan	Police Diary (Telugu)	
13 April	Tamil	Guru Sishyan	S. P. Muthuraman		
28 April	Malayalam	Moonnam Pakkam	Padmarajan		
	Telugu	Mena Mama	Rajasekar Reddy		Telugu remake of the Tamil film, Kanni Raasi
	Tamil	Solla Thudikuthu Manasu	B. Lenin		
	Telugu	Asthulu Anthasthulu	B. Bhaskara Rao		Telugu remake of the Tamil film, Muthal Vasantham.
	Tamil	En Jeevan Paduthu	R. Sundarrajan		
	Tamil	Ennai Vittu Pogaathe	T.K. Bose		
	Tamil	Illam	I. V. Sasi		
	Tamil	Irandil Ondru	V. Azhagappan		
16 July	Telugu	Jamadagni	Bharathiraja		
	Tamil	Raasave Unnai Nambi	T.K. Bose		
	Tamil	Shenbagamae Shenbagamae	Gangai Amaran		
	Tamil	Therkathi Kallan	P. Kalaimani		
	Tamil	Vairavel	Dwight H. Little		Composed music for the Tamil dubbed version
	Tamil	Dhayam Onnu	Peter Selvakumar	Chilipi Donga (Telugu)	
	Tamil	En Bommukutty Ammavukku	Fazil		
	Tamil	En Uyir Kannamma	Sivachandran		
	Tamil	Enga Ooru Kavalkaran	T. P. Gajendran		
	Tamil	Ithu Engal Neethi	S. A. Chandrasekhar		
	Tamil	Manamagale Vaa	Panchu Arunchalam		
	Tamil	Naan Sonnathey Sattam	Ramesh Raj		
	Tamil	Paadatha Thenikkal	V.M.C. Haneefa		
	Tamil	Paarthal Pasu	K. S. Gopalakrishnan		
	Tamil	Paasa Paravaigal	V.M.C. Haneefa		
	Tamil	Poonthotta Kaavalkaaran	Senthilnathan		
	Telugu	Raktabhishekam	A. Kodandarami Reddy		
	Tamil	Sakkarai Pandhal	Gangai Amaran		
	Tamil	Veedu	Balu Mahendra		No songs. Only BGM.
24 September	Tamil	Dharmathin Thalaivan	S. P. Muthuraman		
	Tamil	Oruvar Vaazhum Aalayam	Shanmugapriyan		
	Telugu	Abhinandana	Ashok Kumar		
15 April	Tamil	Agni Natchathiram	Mani Ratnam		Winner, Tamil Nadu State Film Award for Best Music Director
12 March	Telugu	Aakhari Poratam	K. Raghavendra Rao		
	Telugu	Marana Mrudangam	A. Kodandarami Reddy		
	Telugu	Sri Kanaka Mahalakshmi Recording Dance Troupe	Vamsy		
3 October	Telugu	Varasudochadu	A.Mohan Gandhi		
4 March	Telugu	Rudraveena	K. Balachander		Winner, National Film Award for Best Music Direction and Nandi Award for Best Music Director.
12 August	Tamil	Unnal Mudiyum Thambi	K. Balachander		Bilingual. Tamil version of the Telugu superhit, Rudraveena.
15 July	Telugu	Swarnakamalam	K. Viswanath		

== 1989 ==
Date	Language	Film	Director	Dubbed	Notes
	Tamil	Raajadhi Raaja	R. Sundarrajan		
	Tamil	Siva	Ameerjan		
	Tamil	Ore Oru Gramathiley	K. Jyothi Pandiyan		
	Tamil	Enne Petha Raasa	Siraaj		
	Tamil	Tarzan Sundari	Guna Parasad		
	Telugu	Tarzan Sundari	Guna Parasad		
	Tamil	Varusham 16	Fazil		Winner, Tamil Nadu State Film Award for Best Music Director
	Tamil	Anbu Kattalai	Yaar Kannan		
	Tamil	Chinnappadass	C. V. Rajendran		
	Tamil	Dharmam Vellum	K. Rangaraj		
	Tamil	Enga Ooru Mappillai	T. P. Gajendran		
	Telugu	Ashoka Chakravarthy	S.S. Ravichandra		He sang a brief song in the movie.
	Malayalam	Adharvam	Dennis Joseph		
	Telugu	Indrudu Chandrudu	Suresh Krissna	Indran Chandran (Tamil); Mayor Saab (Hindi)	
	Tamil	Pudhu Pudhu Arthangal	K. Balachander		
	Tamil	Maappillai	Rajasekhar		
	Malayalam	Chaitram	?		
	Telugu	Chettu Kinda Pleader	Vamsy		
	Hindi	Mahaadev	Raj N. Sippy		
	Malayalam	Season	Padmarajan		
	Telugu	Geethanjali	Mani Ratnam	Idhayathai Thirudadhe (Tamil)	
	Tamil	Kai Veesamma Kai Veesu	Vinodh		
	Kannada	Namma Bhoomi	R. Thyagarajan		
	Tamil	Ninaivu Chinnam	Anu Mohan		
	Tamil	Paandi Nattu Thangam	T. P. Gajendran		
	Tamil	Paasa Mazhai	Aathavan		
	Tamil	Paattukku Oru Thalaivan	Liyakat Ali Khan		
	Tamil	Padicha Pulla	Senthilnathan		
	Tamil	Pickpocket	G. M. Kumar		
	Tamil	Pongi Varum Kaveri	T.K. Bose		
	Tamil	Ponmana Selvan	P. Vasu		
	Tamil	Poruthathu Pothum	P. Kalaimani		
	Tamil	Raaja Raajathan	Ramdass	500th Film	
	Telugu	Siva	Ram Gopal Varma		
	Tamil	Thangamana Raasa	V. Azhagappan		
	Tamil	Thendral Sudum	Manobala		
	Tamil	Thiruppu Munai	Kalaivanan Kannadasan		
	Tamil	Vaathiyaar Veettu Pillai	P. Vasu		
	Telugu	Gopala Rao Gari Abbayi	Manivannan	Kadhal Oyvadhillai (Tamil)	
	Tamil	Apoorva Sagodharargal	Singeetham Srinivasa Rao	Vichitra Sodarulu (Telugu), Appu Raja (Hindi)	
	Tamil	Vetri Vizha	Prathap Pothen		
	Telugu	Prema	Suresh Krissna		
	Tamil	Karagattakaran	Gangai Amaran	Garagatta Gopaiah (Telugu)	
	Telugu	Rudranetra	K. Raghavendra Rao		
	Telugu	Swathi Chinukulu	Sri Chakravarthy		
	Tamil	Annanukku Jai	Gangai Amaran		
	Tamil	En Purushanthaan Enakku Mattumthaan	Manobala		
	Was conferred with the Filmfare Lifetime Achievement Award – South for his contributions to South Indian films in 1989.				Received

== Decade-wise statistics ==
Ilaiyaraaja 1970's	Ilaiyaraaja 1980's	Ilaiyaraaja 1990's	Ilaiyaraaja 2000's	Ilaiyaraaja 2010's	New
