= Dorothy (soundtrack) =

2026 soundtrack album by Ilaiyaraaja

Soundtrack album by Ilaiyaraaja
- Released: 9 October 2026
- Recorded: 2026
- Genre: Feature film soundtrack
- Length: 23:38
- Language: Tamil
- Label: Sony Music India
- Producer: Ilaiyaraaja

Ilaiyaraaja chronology
Mareechika (2026)	Dorothy (2026)	Lenin Pandiyan (2026)

Singles from Dorothy
- 1. "Kalyana Virundhu" Released: 22 August 2026; 2. "Muthumani" Released: 29 August 2026; 3. "Onna Thottu" Released: 24 September 2026

Dorothy is the soundtrack album composed and written by Ilaiyaraaja for the 2026 Tamil-language romantic drama film of the same name directed by Karthik Subbaraj and produced by Dhammam Films, Sikhya Entertainment and Jio Studios, starring Sananth, Rishikanth and Keerthy Suresh as the titular character. The film is the maiden collaboration between the director and the composer. The soundtrack was led by three singles and was released on 9 October 2026, via Sony Music India. A separate album for the background score was released first, three weeks prior to the film's release.

== Background ==
Dorothy was the first collaboration with Karthik and Ilaiyaraaja, and also the second instance where Karthik worked with another musician over his norm collaborator Santhosh Narayanan, the first being Anirudh Ravichander for Petta (2019). Karthik noted that approaching Ilaiyaraaja was not a part of his original plan, until he completed the shooting, where he showcased the entire first cut to Ilaiyaraaja awaiting his response. Ilaiyaraaja liked the film and eventually agreed to be part of it.

Karthik considered working with Ilaiyaraaja as a "dream come true" moment, where the director had often referenced the composer in his films. He recalled that Ilaiyaraaja's studio album How to Name It? (1986) had a profound impact in shaping his formative years as a teenager, and some of his compositions had inspired his writing. However, he felt apprehensive on approaching him for a project, which Karthik admitted it as a "respect tinged with fear". Since there was a short timeline for the compositions and had to be ready for film festival screenings, Karthik shot the film with some of Ilaiyaraaja's music being used as reference point and then shown the final edit to Ilaiyaraaja which had his approval.

== Composition ==
Ilaiyaraaja composed the songs and film score for Dorothy within 20–25 days. For the climax sequence, Karthik used the song "Kaadhalin Deepam Ondru" from Thambikku Entha Ooru (1984) as a reference and then asked him whether that song would be used. Ilaiyaraaja felt that the existing song was not relevant to that sequence, and assured that he would compose a new song for that situation, which led to the creation of the trance number "Muthumani". Karthik recalled that he was "blown away from that moment" on how that song shaped up.

Karthik used the track "Do Anything" from How to Name It? as another reference point, and asked whether that song could be used to that film. Ilaiyaraaja then wrote out the notes for the track and recomposed it as a modernised version titled "How Else to Name It?". Ilaiyaraaja told Karthik that he altered the notes of that musical piece to match with the visuals and mood of the film which Karthik praised it.

== Release ==
The album was preceded with the first single "Kalyana Virundhu" which released on 22 August 2026. "Muthumani" was released as the second single on 29 August, accompanied with a music video featuring Ilaiyaraaja, the cast and the musical team. The third and final single "Onna Thottu" was released on 24 September, a day before the film's release. The soundtrack was released on 9 October, two weeks after the film's release.

== Reception ==
Bhuvanesh Chander of The Hindu noted that Ilaiyaraaja's music "becomes a character itself in Dorothy" and further added that "[he] once again displays an understanding of when to vanish into the background and let the material speak for itself, and when the song must come to add new meaning or emotional heft to the text." Prathyush Parasuraman of The Hollywood Reporter India and Anandu Suresh of The Indian Express described it as an "intuitive" and "spellbinding" score. M Suganth of The Times of India wrote "Ilaiyaraaja's terrific music is a burst of thunder in the first half and a soft caress in the latter portions, lending the drama, and its delicate handling of queer lives and relationships, both weight and empathy."

Janani K. of India Today wrote "composer Ilaiyaraaja holds the film together. His background score makes the film feel rooted yet international at the same time." Sreeju Sudhakaran of Rediff.com works consistently throughout the film, adding that "While the maestro excels at amplifying the rugged rural aesthetics of the first half, it is during the serene portions of the second half that his score hits the peaks. The recurring use of a haunting female vocal in the quiet scenes between the friends is simply brilliant."

== Track listing ==
All lyrics are written by Ilaiyaraaja.

No.	Title	Singer(s)	Length
1.	"Kalyana Virundhu"	Yugendran, Anthony Daasan, Priya Jerson	3:57
2.	"Muthumani"	Ilaiyaraaja, Shweta Mohan	5:01
3.	"Onna Thottu"	Priya Jerson	5:00
4.	"Yethum Illai"	Priya Jerson	4:24
5.	"Kanagamani"	Ilaiyaraaja	3:15
6.	"Vanakiliye"	Ilaiyaraaja	2:01
Total length:			23:38

== Background score ==
Dorothy

Film score by Ilaiyaraaja
- Released: 5 September 2026
- Recorded: 2026
- Genre: Feature film score
- Length: 41:39
- Language: Tamil
- Label: Sony Music India
- Producer: Ilaiyaraaja
External audio
- Dorothy – OST Jukebox on YouTube

Ilaiyaraaja insisted that the film's background score should be released before the theatrical release in the form of a live symphony concert. As per his suggestion, a separate album for the background score, consisting of 18 tracks, was released on 5 September 2026, much prior to the film's release. It was promoted with a 40-minute concert where the tracks were performed live being held the same day at Image Auditorium, Chennai.

No.	Title	Length
1.	"Rowdy Ya"	2:08
2.	"Kola Pottu"	1:29
3.	"Yethum Illai"	4:13
4.	"Sambavam"	4:28
5.	"Red Sand"	1:19
6.	"Out of Home"	1:34
7.	"Blessing"	1:04
8.	"Birthday"	2:08
9.	"Angels"	1:47
10.	"How Else to Name It?"	2:51
11.	"Long Drive"	1:39
12.	"First Night"	1:43
13.	"Kaatru Maram"	4:19
14.	"Piriya Vidai"	3:41
15.	"Bommai"	2:10
16.	"Nanba"	1:22
17.	"Poison"	2:27
18.	"Parotta Chukka"	1:17
Total length:		41:39
