= List of films scored by Ilaiyaraaja in the 1970s =

This article lists the films composed by Ilaiyaraaja in the 1970s..

== 1976 ==
Date	Language	Film	Director	Dubbed	Notes
14 May	Tamil	Annakkili	Devaraj Mohan		
20 Aug	Tamil	Paalooti Valartha Kili	Devaraj Mohan		
27 Nov	Tamil	Uravadum Nenjam	Devaraj Mohan	Aaru Manikkoor Malayalam - 1978	
10 Dec	Tamil	Bhadrakali	A. C. Tirulokchandar		

== 1977 ==
Date	Language	Film	Director	Dubbing	Notes
26 Jan	Tamil	Dheepam	K. Vijayan		
	Tamil	Aalukku Oru Aasai	S.P. Muthuraman		
	Tamil	Avar Enakke Sontham	Pattu		
	Telugu	Bhadrakali	A. C. Tirulokchandar		Remake of the 1976 Tamil film, Bhadrakali.
27 July	Tamil	Kavikkuyil	Devaraj Mohan		
5 Aug	Tamil	Thunai Iruppal Meenakshi	Valampuri Somanathan		
19 Aug	Tamil	Penn Jenmam	A. C. Tirulokchandar		
9 Sep	Tamil	Bhuvana Oru Kelvi Kuri	S. P. Muthuraman		
15 Sep	Tamil	16 Vayathinile	Bharathiraja		Winner, Tamil Nadu State Film Award for Best Music Director
7 Oct	Tamil	Gaayathri	R.Pattabhiraman		
7 Oct	Tamil	Odi Vilayaadu Thaatha	T.N. Balu		
9 Dec	Tamil	Durga Devi	Ra. Sankaran		
15 Dec	Tamil	Sainthadamma Sainthadu	Devaraj Mohan		

== 1978 ==
Date	Language	Film	Director	Dubbed	Notes
14 Jan	Tamil	Kaatrinile Varum Geetham	S. P. Muthuraman		
14 Jan	Tamil	Vaazha Ninaiththaal Vaazhalaam	Devaraj Mohan		
3 Feb	Tamil	Maariyamman Thiruvizha	N. Venkatesh		
4 Feb	Tamil	Achchani	Karaikudi Narayanan		
04 Mar	Tamil	Thyagam	K. Vijayan		
31 Mar	Kannada	Maathu Tappada Maga	Peketi Sivaram		
14 Apr	Tamil	Thirukkalyanam	K.Chandrabose		
21 Apr	Tamil	Ithu Eppadi Irukku	R Pattabhiraman		
4 May	Malayalam	Vyamoham	K. G. George		
5 May	Tamil	Tripura Sundari	K. Chandrabose		
8 Jun	Tamil	Bairavi	M.Bhaskar		
9 Jun	Tamil	Aval Oru Pachai Kuzhandhai	S.C. Sekar		
9 Jun	Tamil	Chittu Kuruvi	Devaraj Mohan		
9 Jun	Tamil	Ilamai Oonjal Aadukirathu	C.V.Sridhar		
14 Jul	Tamil	Sattam En Kaiyil	T.N.Baalu		
28 Jul	Tamil	Vattathukkul Chaduram	S. P. Muthuraman		
10 Aug	Tamil	Kizhake Pogum Rail	Bharathiraja		
14 Aug	Telugu	Vayasu Pilichindi	C. V. Sridhar		Bilingual. Telugu version of Ilamai Oonjal Aadukirathu.
15 Aug	Tamil	Mullum Malarum	Mahendran	Mullu Poovu (Telugu)	
8 Sep	Tamil	Kannan Oru Kai Kuzhandhai	N. Venkatesh		
28 Oct	Tamil	Sigappu Rojakkal	Bharathiraja	Erra Gulabeelu (Telugu)	
30 Oct	Tamil	Aval Appadithan	C. Rudhraiya		
30 Nov	Tamil	Sonnadhu Nee Dhanaa	C.N.Muthu		
19 Dec	Tamil	Priya	S. P. Muthuraman	Ajayudu (Telugu)	

== 1979 ==
Date	Language	Film	Director	Dubbed	Notes
14 Sep	Tamil	Aarulirunthu Arubathuvarai	S. P. Muthuraman	O Inti Katha (Telugu)	
2 Mar	Tamil	Lakshmi	T.K. Mohan		
04 Dec	Tamil	Agal Vilakku	R. Selvaraj		
15 Aug	Tamil	Pagalil Oru Iravu	I. V. Sasi	Nuvve Naa Srimathi (Telugu)	
	Tamil	Anbe Sangeetha	Karaikudi Narayanan		
	Tamil	Ilaiyarajavin Rasigai			Unreleased Film
	Telugu	Amma Evarikkaina Amma	R. Thyagarajan		Bilingual. Also made in Tamil as Annai Oru Aalayam.
19 Oct	Tamil	Annai Oru Aalayam	R. Thyagarajan		
29 June	Tamil	Dharma Yuddham	R. C. Sakthi		
	Tamil	Chakkalathi	Devaraj Mohan		
	Tamil	Kadavul Amaitha Medai	S. P. Muthuraman		
	Tamil	Manipoor Mamiyaar	V.C. Kuganathan		Film went unreleased. A song from this film, Samayal Paadame, also written by Ilaiyaraaja, was reused as Enna Samayalo in Unnaal Mudiyum Thambi in 1988.
6 July	Tamil	Kalyanaraman	G. N. Rangarajan		
6 April	Tamil	Kavari Maan	S. P. Muthuraman		
	Tamil	Mugaththil Mugam Paarkkalaam	A. Jagannathan		
	Tamil	Nenjil Aadum Poo Ondru			Film went unreleased. The songs, Vaanam Enge and Kodi Inbam, today command a cult following among his hardcore fans.
	Tamil	Muthal Iravu	A. Jagannathan		
10 Aug	Tamil	Naan Vazhavaippen	D. Yoganand	Raja (Telugu)	
	Kannada	Priya	S. P. Muthuraman		Bilingual. Kannada version of the Tamil film Priya (1978).
	Tamil	Azhage Unnai Aarathikkiren	C. V. Sridhar		
	Telugu	Pancha Bhoothalu	P. Chandrasekar Reddy		
30 Nov	Telugu	Yugandhar	KSR Das		Only collaboration with N. T. Rama Rao
3 May	Tamil	Nallathoru Kudumbam	K Vijayan		
31 Aug	Tamil	Niram Maaratha Pookkal	Bharathiraja		
19 Oct	Tamil	Pattaakathi Bairavan	V. B. Rajendra Prasad		
5 May	Tamil	Ponnu Oorukku Pudhusu	R.Selvaraj		
	Tamil	Poonthalir	Devaraj Mohan		
14 Apr	Tamil	Puthiya Vaarpugal	Bharathiraja	Kotha Jeevithalu	Remade in Telugu as Kotha Jeevithalu.
	Tamil	Rosappo Ravikaikaari	Devaraj Mohan		
	Kannada	Urvashi Neene Nanna Preyasi	C. V. Sridhar		Trilingual. Also made in Tamil as Azhage Unnai Aradhikkiren.
	Telugu	Urvasi Neeve Naa Preyasi	C. V. Sridhar		Trilingual. Telugu version of Azhage Unnai Aradhikkiren.
19 Oct	Tamil	Uthiri Pookal	Mahendran		
08 Dec	Tamil	Vetrikku Oruvan	S. P. Muthuraman		

== Decade-wise statistics ==
Ilaiyaraaja 1970's	Ilaiyaraaja 1980's	Ilaiyaraaja 1990's	Ilaiyaraaja 2000's	Ilaiyaraaja 2010's	New

== Bibliography ==
- Dhananjayan, G. (2011). The Best of Tamil Cinema, 1931 to 2010: 1977–2010. Galatta Media. ISBN 978-81-921043-0-0.
- Dhananjayan, G. (2014). Pride of Tamil Cinema: 1931 to 2013. Blue Ocean Publishers. ISBN 978-93-84301-05-7.
