= List of films scored by Ilaiyaraaja in the 2010s =

This article lists the films composed by Ilaiyaraaja in the 2010s.

== 2010 ==
Date	Language	Film	Director	Dubbed	Notes
13 January	Telugu	Om Shanti	Prakash Dantaluri		
14 January	Kannada	Suryakaanti	K. M. Chaitanya		
	Malayalam	Swarnamaalika	M Venki. babu		
	Malayalam	Killaadi	Krish		
	Malayalam	Kilimozhi Kinaaram	Fazil		
7 May	Malayalam	Kadha Thudarunnu	Sathyan Anthikad		
28 May	Kannada	Nannavanu	Srinivas Raju		
3 September	Telugu	Gaayam 2	Praveen Sri		
26 November	Tamil	Nandalala	Mysskin		

== 2011 ==
Date	Language	Film	Director	Dubbed	Notes
11 March	Tamil	Ayyan	Kendiran Muniyaswamy		
9 April	Tamil	Ponnar Shankar	Thiagarajan		
12 May	Tamil	Azhagarsamiyin Kudhirai	Suseenthiran		Film Winner, Norway Tamil Film Fest's Award for Best Music Director
29 July	Kannada	Hare Rama Hare Krishna	CV Ashok Kumar		
	Malayalam	Oru Premasallapam			
	Malayalam	Snehathooval			
	Malayalam	My Dear Kuttichaathan (Digital)			
30 September	Malayalam	Snehaveedu	Sathyan Anthikad		
17 November	Telugu	Sri Rama Rajyam	Bapu	Sri Rama Rajyam (Malayalam)	Winner, Nandi Award for Best Music Director
25 November	Marathi	HELLO Jai Hind!	Gajendra Ahire		Illayaraja's first outing in Marathi films

== 2012 ==
Date	Language	Film	Director	Dubbed	Notes
3 February	Tamil	Sengathu Bhoomiyilae	M. Rathnakumar		
10 February	Tamil	Dhoni	Prakash Raj		
10 February	Telugu	Dhoni	Prakash Raj		
23 March	Kannada	Prasad	Manoj Sati		
30 March	Tamil	Mudhalvar Mahatma	A.Balakrishnan	Welcome Back Gandhi (Hindi)	
27 September	Malayalam	Puthiya Theerangal	Sathyan Anthikad		
26 October	Tamil	Mayilu	Jeevan		
14 December	Telugu	Yeto Vellipoyindhi Manasu	Gautham Vasudev Menon		Winner, Nandi Award for Best Music Director
13 December	Tamil	Neethaane En Ponvasantham	Gautham Vasudev Menon		
2012	Was conferred with the Sangeet Natak Akademi Award for Creative and Experimental Music				Received

== 2013 ==
Date	Language	Film	Director	Dubbed	Notes
8 March	Telugu	Gundello Godari	Kumar Nagendra	Maranthen Mannithen (Tamil)	
19 April	Marathi	Touring Talkies	Gajendra Ahire		
27 September	Tamil	Onaayum Aatukuttiyum	Mysskin		
18 October	Tamil	Chithirayil Nilachoru	R. Sundarrajan		
20 December	Tamil	Thalaimuraigal	Balu Mahendra		

== 2014 ==
Date	Language	Film	Director	Dubbed	Notes
28 March	Tamil	Oru Oorla	K.C.Vasanth Kumar		
6 June	Kannada	Oggarane	Prakash Raj		Trilingual - Remake of Malayalam hit Salt N' Pepper
6 June	Telugu	Ulavacharu Biryani	Prakash Raj		Trilingual - Remake of Malayalam hit Salt N' Pepper
6 June	Tamil	Un Samayal Arayil	Prakash Raj		Trilingual — Remake of Malayalam hit Salt N' Pepper
20 June	Kannada	Drishya	P.Vasu		Remake of Malayalam hit Drishyam
29 August	Tamil	Megha	Karthik Rishi		

== 2015 ==
Date	Language	Film	Director	Dubbed	Notes
30 January	Tamil	Touring Talkies	S. A. Chandrasekhar		
6 February	Hindi	Shamitabh	R. Balki		
20 February	Kannada	Mythri	B.M.Giriraj		
21 March	Telugu	Yevade Subramanyam	Nag Ashwin		1 Song
12 June	Malayalam	My Hero Mythri	B.M.Giriraj		
9 October	Telugu	Rudramadevi	Gunasekhar	Rudhramadevi (Tamil) (Hindi) & (Malayalam)	
2015	Was conferred with the IFFI Centenary Award for Lifetime Achievement at 46th International Film Festival of India (IFFI) in 2015.				Received

== 2016 ==
Date	Language	Film	Director	Dubbed	Notes
1 January	Telugu	Abbayitho Ammayi	Ramesh Varma		
14 January	Tamil	Tharai Thappattai	Bala		1000th film as composer. Winner, National Film Award for the Best Background Score
26 February	Kannada	Game	A. M. R. Ramesh		Bilingual — Tamil as Oru Melliya Kodu
1 April	Hindi	Ki & Ka	R. Balki		Single track – "Foolishq" and complete background score.
8 April	Tamil	Oyee	Francis Markus		
8 April	Tamil	Kida Poosari Magudi	J. Jayakumar		
24 June	Tamil	Amma Kanakku	Ashwini Iyer Tiwari		Remake of Hindi Film Nil Battey Sannata
1 July	Tamil	Oru Melliya Kodu	A. M. R. Ramesh		Bilingual — Kannada as Game
1 July	Tamil	Appa	Samuthirakani		
2 September	Tamil	Kutrame Thandanai	M. Manikandan		
7 October	Telugu	Mana Oori Ramayanam	Prakash Raj	Bilingual	
7 October	Kannada	Idolle Ramayana	Prakash Raj	Bilingual	
21 October	Malayalam	Daffadar	Johnson Esthappan		
2 Nov	English	Love & Love Only	Julian Karikalan		

== 2017 ==
Date	Language	Film	Director	Dubbed	Notes
17 February	Kannada	Mana Manthana	Suresh Heblikar		
24 February	Tamil	Muthuramalingam	Rajadurai		No separate soundtrack released
5 May	Tamil	Enga Amma Rani	S.Bani		
2 June	Tamil	Oru Iyakkunarin Kadhal Diary	Velu Prabhakaran		
23 July	Malayalam	Clint	Harikumar		
15 September	Telugu	Kathalo Rajakumari	Mahesh Surapaneni		Composed 2 songs, Naa Kathalo Maharani and Thilakodi Vesham. The remaining soundtrack and BGM was done by Vishal Chandrasekhar.
27 October	Tamil	Kalathur Gramam	Saran K Adwaithan		

== 2018 ==
Date	Language	Film	Director	Dubbed	Notes
16 February	Tamil	Naachiyaar	Bala		
1 May	Tamil	Sometimes	Priyadarshan		No Songs - Movie released on Netflix
18 May	Tamil	18.05.2009	K Ganeshan		
24 August	Tamil	Merku Thodarchi Malai	Lenin Bharathi		
31 August	Tamil	60 Vayadu Maaniram	Radha Mohan		

== 2019 ==
Date	Language	Film	Director	Dubbed	Notes
Dec 25	Hindi	Happi	Bhavna Talwar		Released in Zee5 OTT platform.

== Decade-wise statistics ==
Ilaiyaraaja 1970's	Ilaiyaraaja 1980's	Ilaiyaraaja 1990's	Ilaiyaraaja 2000's	Ilaiyaraaja 2010's	Ilaiyaraaja 2020's	New
