= List of films scored by Ilaiyaraaja in the 2000s =

The following lists the films composed by Ilaiyaraaja in the 2000s.

== 2000 ==
Date	Language	Film	Director	Dubbed	Notes
14 January	Tamil	Kadhal Rojavae	Keyaar		
14 January	Tamil	Kannukkul Nilavu	Fazil		
18 February	Tamil	Hey Ram	Kamal Haasan		900th Film Background score recorded with the Budapest Symphony Orchestra in Hungary. India's official selection for its entry into the Academy Awards for The Best Foreign Language Film.
18 February	Hindi	Hey Ram	Kamal Haasan		Winner, Screen Award for Best Background Music.
10 March	Tamil	Kakkai Siraginilae	P. Vasu		
22 September	Tamil	Karuvelam Pookkal	Poomani		
14 January	Tamil	Thirunelveli	Bharathi Kannan		
8 June	Tamil	Karisakattu Poove	Kasthuri Raja		
14 April	Malayalam	Kochu Kochu Santhoshangal	Sathyan Anthikkad		
1 September	Tamil	Bharathi	Gnana Rajasekaran		
23 September	Tamil	Ilayavan	T. Babu		
23 December	English	Pandavas: The Five Warriors	Usha Ganesh Raja	only one instrumental used in the film	3D animated film.

== 2001 ==
Date	Language	Film	Director	Dubbed	Notes
	Tamil	Kutty	Janaki Vishwanathan		
	Tamil	En Iniya Ponnilave	Balu Mahendra		Songs composed by Ilaiyaraaja and M.S. Viswanathan. Ilaiyaraaja composed 2 songs while the remaining soundtrack was composed by MSV. The BGM was done by a newcomer. Much delayed theatrical release.
	Tamil	Kasi	Vinayan	Kasinath (Telugu)	
	Tamil	Friends	Siddique		
	Tamil	Kanna Unnai Thedukiren	Jeeva Selvaraj		
	Tamil	Aandan Adimai	Manivannan		
	Tamil	Kadhal Jaathi	Kasthuri Raja		Film went unreleased.
	Tamil	Kaatrukkenna Veli	Pugazendhi Thangaraj		
	Hindi	Lajja	Rajkumar Santoshi		
	Kannada	Usire	A.X. Prabhu		

== 2002 ==
Date	Language	Film	Director	Dubbed	Notes
	Tamil	Azhagi	Thangar Bachan		
	Tamil	Ivan	R. Parthiepan		
	Tamil	Devan	C. Arunpandian		
	Tamil	En Mana Vaanil	Vinayan		
	Telugu	Ninu Choodaka Nenundalenu	R. Srinivas		
	Tamil	Ramanaa	A. R. Murugadoss		Only collaboration of Murugadoss with Ilaiyaraaja. Remade into 4 Languages
	Tamil	Solla Marandha Kadhai	Thangar Bachan		
	Malayalam	Nizhalkuthu	Adoor Gopalakrishnan		no song (score only)

== 2003 ==
Date	Language	Film	Director	Dubbed	Notes
	Tamil	Pithamagan	Bala	Sivaputrudu (Telugu) - 6 songs	
	Telugu	Sambhu	R Suresh Varma		
	Malayalam	Manassinakkare	Sathyan Anthikad		Winner, Filmfare Award for Best Music.
	Tamil	Julie Ganapathy	Balu Mahendra		
	Malayalam	Chakravaalam	Balu Mahendra		
	Malayalam	Mayamohithachandran	Shibu		
	Tamil	Dhanush			Film went unreleased.
	Tamil	Konji Pesalaam	R. Kaleeswaran		
	Tamil	Manasellam	Santhosh	Manasantha (Telugu) - 7 songs	

== 2004 ==
Date	Language	Film	Director	Dubbed	Notes
	Tamil	Virumaandi	Kamal Haasan	Pothuraju (Telugu) - 5 songs	
	Kannada	Namma Preethiya Ramu			Remake of the Tamil hit, Kaasi.
	Telugu	Shiva Shankar	Kapuganti Rajendra		
	Tamil	Kamaraj	A. Balakrishnan		
	Tamil	Vishwa Thulasi	Sumathy Ram		Soundtrack jointly composed by Ilaiyaraaja and M.S. Viswanathan. Won the Golden Remi Award for Best Music with MSV at the WorldFest-Houston International Film Festival

== 2005 ==
Date	Language	Film	Director	Dubbed	Notes
	Tamil	Adhu Oru Kana Kaalam	Balu Mahendra		
	Malayalam	Achuvinte Amma	Sathyan Anthikad		Winner, Filmfare Award for Best Music.
	Tamil	Chidambarathil Oru Appasamy	Thangar Bachan		
	Malayalam	Ponmudipuzhayorathu	Johnson Esthappan		
	Malayalam	Twinkle Twinkle Little Star	Vayalar Madhavan Kutty		Film yet to release.
	Hindi	Mumbai Xpress	Singeetham Sreenivasa Rao		
	Tamil	Mumbai Xpress	Singeetham Sreenivasa Rao	Mumbai Xpress (Telugu)	
	Tamil	Oru Naal Oru Kanavu	Fazil		
	Hindi	Divorce: Not Between Husband and Wife	M.J. Ramanan		no song
	Tamil	Kasthuri Maan	A. K. Lohithadas		
	Tamil	Karagattakkari	Bharathi Kannan		
	Tamil	Pon Megalai	Sakthi Chithran		

== 2006 ==
Date	Language	Film	Director	Dubbed	Notes
20 March	Malayalam	Rasathanthram	Sathyan Anthikkad		
14 April	Malayalam	Pachakuthira	Kamal	Ennai Nee Thaan Pirinthaalum (Tamil)	
15 September	Hindi	Shiva	Ram Gopal Varma	Udhayam 2006 (Tamil), Shiva 2006 (Tamil)	
12 May	Tamil	Madhu	K. Thennarasu		
17 November	Tamil	Desiya Paravai	Babu Ganesh		
	Tamil	Naan Oru Indhiyan	Babu Ganesh		Film was released under the title Desiya Paravai (6 songs)
	Tamil	Uppu	R. Selvaraj		Film went unreleased.
	Telugu	Hope	Satish Kasetty		no song

== 2007 ==
Date	Language	Film	Director	Dubbed	Notes
	Kannada	Aa Dinagalu	K. M. Chaitanya		
	Tamil	Kutra Pathirigai	R. K. Selvamani		Much delayed film. Soundtrack released in 1992.
	Telugu	Anumanaspadam	Vamsy		Marked the comeback of Vamsy's Collaboration with Ilaiyaraaja
	Hindi	Cheeni Kum	Balki		
	Tamil	Inimey Nangathan	S. Venkibabu		Animated film.
	Malayalam	Vinodayathra	Sathyan Anthikad		
	Malayalam	Nayakan		Malayalam dubbed version of 1987 Tamil film Nayakan - 7 songs	
	Malayalam	Sooryan	V. M. Vinu	Thozhan (Tamil) - 4 songs	
	Tamil	Maya Kannadi	Cheran		
	Telugu	Sunny	Kamalakar		
	Telugu	Hope	K. Sathyanarayan		Released in film festival

== 2008 ==
Date	Language	Film	Director	Dubbed	Notes
	Tamil	Dhanam	G. Siva	Dhanam (Telugu) released in 2011	
	Malayalam	Innathe Chintha Vishayam	Sathyan Anthikad		
	Malayalam	SMS	Sarjulan		
	Telugu	Oh My God	Giridhar Gopal		Unreleased project
	Tamil	Uliyin Osai	Ilavenil		
	Tamil	Kangalum Kavipaduthey	K. Chandranath		Unreleased project

== 2009 ==
Date	Language	Film	Director	Dubbed	Notes
	Tamil	Naan Kadavul	Bala	Nene Devudni (Telugu)	
	Telugu	Mallepuvvu	V. Samudra		
	Malayalam	Bhagyadevatha	Sathyan Anthikad		
	Malayalam	Kerala Varma Pazhassi Raja	Hariharan		Winner, National Film Award for the Best Background Score
	Kannada	Bhagyada Balegara	Sai Prakash		
	Tamil	Azhagar Malai	S.P. Rajkumar		
	Kannada	Prem Kahani	R. Chandru		
	Hindi	Chal Chalein	Ujjwal Singh		
	Tamil	Vaalmiki	G. Anantha Narayanan		
	Tamil	Kadhal Kadhai	Velu Prabhakaran		
	Hindi	Paa	Balki		
	Tamil	Jaganmohini	N.K. Viswanathan	Jaganmohini (Telugu)	
	Tamil	Kannukulle	Lena Moovendhar		
	Tamil	Mathiya Chennai	Vivekanand & Veerasingam		
	Telugu	Ajantha	Kathaka Thirumavalavan		Multilingual. Made in all 4 southern languages.
	Malayalam	Ajantha	Kathaka Thirumavalavan		
	Kannada	Ajantha	Kathaka Thirumavalavan		
	Tamil	Ajantha	Kathaka Thirumavalavan		Winner, Tamil Nadu State Film Award for Best Music Director

== Decade-wise statistics ==
Ilaiyaraaja 1970's	Ilaiyaraaja 1980's	Ilaiyaraaja 1990's	Ilaiyaraaja 2000's	Ilaiyaraaja 2010's	New
