= List of films scored by Ilaiyaraaja in the 1990s =

This page lists the films composed by Ilaiyaraaja in the 1990s.

== 1990 ==
Date	Language	Film	Director	Dubbed	Notes
7 December	Hindi	Shiva	Ram Gopal Varma		
9 May	Telugu	Jagadeka Veerudu Athiloka Sundari	K. Raghavendra Rao		Winner - Nandi Award for Best Music Director
14 September	Telugu	Bobbili Raja	B. Gopal		Winner - Filmfare Award for Best Music Director – Telugu
15 June	Tamil	Adhisaya Piravi	S. P. Muthuraman		
	Telugu	Idem Pellam Baboi	Katragadda Raviteja		Telugu remake of the Tamil film, Manamagale Vaa
17 October	Tamil	Mallu Vetti Minor	Manobala		
12 July	Tamil	Anjali	Mani Ratnam	Anjali (Telugu); Anjali (Hindi)	India's official submission for The Academy Award for the Best Foreign Film
	Telugu	Kondaveeti Donga	A. Kodandarami Reddy		
17 October	Tamil	Chatriyan	K. Subash		
14 January	Tamil	Kavalukku Kettikaran	Santhana Bharathi		
	Telugu	Kokila	Geetha Krishna		
	Telugu	Preyasi	?		
23 February	Tamil	Paattukku Naan Adimai	Shanmugapriyan		
11 May	Tamil	Pagalil Pournami	Cochin Haneefa		
14 January	Tamil	Pulan Visaranai	R. K. Selvamani		
17 October	Tamil	Amman Kovil Thiruvizha	P. R. Somasundar		
16 February	Tamil	En Uyir Thozhan	Bharathiraja		
14 September	Tamil	Engitta Mothathay	R. Sundarrajan		
7 December	Tamil	Ethir Kaatru	Mukta S. Sundar		
16 March	Tamil	Kavidhai Paadum Alaigal	T.K. Bose		
27 July	Tamil	Keladi Kanmani	Vasanth		
14 January	Tamil	Panakkaran	P. Vasu		
12 July	Tamil	Kizhakku Vasal	R. V. Udayakumar		
23 February	Tamil	Arangetra Velai	Fazil		
	Telugu	Guru Sishyulu	S. P. Muthuraman		Telugu remake of the Tamil hit, Guru Sishyan
17 October	Tamil	Michael Madana Kama Rajan	Singeetam Srinivasa Rao	Michael Madana Kama Raju (Telugu)	
22 June	Tamil	Madurai Veeran Enga Saami	Shanmugapriyan		
27 April	Tamil	Maruthu Pandi	Manoj Kumar		
15 June	Tamil	Mounam Sammadham	K. Madhu		
24 August	Tamil	My Dear Marthandan	Prathap Pothan		
30 November	Tamil	Nadigan	P. Vasu		
14 Dec	Tamil	Nee Sirithaal Deepavali	Malaysia Vasudevan		
14 July	Tamil	Ooru Vittu Ooru Vanthu	Gangai Amaran		
11 May	Tamil	Periya Veetu Pannakkaran	N. K. Viswanathan		
14 April	Tamil	Pondatti Thevai	R. Parthiepan		
17 October	Tamil	Puthu Paatu	Panchu Arunachalam		
7 December	Tamil	Raja Kaiya Vacha	Suresh Krissna		
20 July	Tamil	Sirayil Pootha Chinna Malar	Amirtham		
17 October	Tamil	Sirayil Sila Raagangal	Rajendrakumar		
5 September	Tamil	Thalattu Padava	R. Sundarrajan		
	Malayalam	Samrajyam	Jeomon		no songs
17 March	Tamil	Unnai Solli Kutramillai	Ameerjan		
30 November	Tamil	Urudhi Mozhi	R. V. Udayakumar		
2 November	Tamil	Vellaiya Thevan	Manoj Kumar		

== 1991 ==
Date	Language	Film	Director	Dubbed	Notes
5 November	Tamil	Thalapathi	Mani Ratnam	Dhalapathi (Telugu), Dalpathi (Hindi)	Winner, Filmfare Award for Best Music Director - Tamil. The song, Rakkamma Kaiya Thattu was ranked as the fourth most popular song worldwide in a poll conducted by BBC World Service in 2002.
12 January	Tamil	Eeramana Rojave	Keyaar		
31 May	Tamil	Ennarukil Nee Irunthal	Sundar K. Vijayan		
22 March	Tamil	Gopura Vasalile	Priyadarshan	Prema Rayabaram (Telugu)	
16 February	Tamil	Irumbu Pookkal	G. M. Kumar		Jointly composed by Ilaiyaraaja (2 songs) and M. S. Viswanathan (Remaining songs and BGM).
14 January	Tamil	Kumbakarai Thangaiah	Gangai Amaran		
7 June	Tamil	Manitha Jaathi	P. Kalaimani		
21 June	Tamil	Pudhiya Raagam	Jayachitra		
11 January	Tamil	Sami Potta Mudichu	R. Sundarrajan		
21 June	Tamil	Sir... I Love You	G. N. Rangarajan		
	Malayalam	Anaswaram	Joemon		
5 November	Tamil	Guna	Santhana Bharathi	Guna (Telugu)	
14 January	Tamil	Dharma Durai	Rajasekhar	Khaidi Annayya (Telugu)	
13 April	Tamil	En Rasavin Manasile	Kasthuri Raja		
6 September	Tamil	Idhayam	Kathir		
12 April	Tamil	Chinna Thambi	P. Vasu		
22 June	Tamil	Thanthu Vitten Ennai	C. V. Sridhar		
15 March	Tamil	Uruvam	G. M. Kumar		
15 March	Tamil	Vetri Padigal	Manobala		
15 March	Tamil	Vetri Karangal	R. Krishnamoorthy		
	Telugu	Chaitanya	Prathap Pothan		
19 April	Tamil	Karpoora Mullai	Fazil		Bilingual. Shot in Malayalam as Ente Suryaputhrikku.
	Malayalam	Ente Sooryaputhrikku	Fazil		
23 March	Tamil	Thanga Thamaraigal	V. Azhagappan	Gang Fighter (Telugu)	
5 November	Tamil	Bramma	K. Subash		
	Telugu	Coolie No. 1	K. Raghavendra Rao		
5 November	Tamil	Thalattu Ketkuthamma	Raj Kapoor		
12 September	Tamil	Thambikki Oru Paattu	Ashok Kumar		
30 August	Tamil	Oorellaam Un Paattu	Siraaj		
5 November	Tamil	Pillai Paasam	Cochin Haneefa		
15 March	Tamil	Pudhu Nellu Pudhu Naathu	Bharathiraja		
27 December	Tamil	Thayamma	Gopi Bhimsingh		
	Telugu	Aditya 369	Singeetam Srinivasa Rao		Dubbed in Tamil as Aboorva Sakthi 369.
	Telugu	Sri Yedukondala Swamy	Kamalakara Kameswara Rao		
	Telugu	Keechurallu	Geetha Krishna		
	Telugu	Nirnayam	Priyadarshan		
	Telugu	Stuartpuram Police Station	Yandamuri Veerendranath		
	Telugu	April 1st Vidudhala	Vamsy		
	Telugu	Surya IPS	A. Kodandarami Reddy		
14 April	Tamil	Captain Prabhakaran	R. K. Selvamani	Captain Prabhakar (Telugu) and (Hindi)	

== 1992 ==
Date	Language	Film	Director	Dubbed	Notes
4 September	Malayalam	Pappayude Swantham Appoos	Fazil	Poove Ponpoove (Tamil)	
	Telugu	Pattudala	?		
14 February	Tamil	Kaaval Geetham	S. P. Muthuraman		
15 January	Tamil	Pandithurai	Manoj Kumar		
15 January	Tamil	Rickshaw Mama	P. Vasu		
1 May	Tamil	Chinna Pasanga Naanga	Raj Kapoor		
15 January	Tamil	Vanna Vanna Pookkal	Balu Mahendra		
	Telugu	Chanti	Ravi Raja Pinisetty		Remake of Tamil film Chinna Thambi
	Telugu	Prema Vijetha	K. Sada Siva Rao		
27 June	Tamil	Ponnuketha Purushan	Gangai Amaran		
	Telugu	Killer	Fazil		
7 February	Tamil	Thambi Pondatti	Panchu Arunachalam		
12 September	Tamil	Pangali	K. Subash		
25 October	Tamil	Senthamizh Paattu	P. Vasu		Composed jointly by M.S. Viswanathan and Ilaiyaraaja
15 January	Tamil	Mannan	P. Vasu		
	Malayalam	Aparatha	I. V. Sasi		
7 February	Tamil	Agni Paarvai	P. Madhavan		
17 April	Tamil	Chembaruthi	R. K. Selvamani		
24 July	Tamil	Magudam	Prathap Pothen		
5 June	Tamil	Idhu Namma Bhoomi	P. Vasu		
24 April	Tamil	Chinnavar	Gangai Amaran		
25 October	Tamil	Pandiyan	S. P. Muthuraman		Pandiyanin Raajiyathil was composed by Karthik Raja. The remaining soundtrack was composed by Ilaiyaraaja
27 November	Tamil	Villu Pattukaran	Gangai Amaran		
25 October	Tamil	Thirumathi Palanisamy	R. Sundarrajan		
20 March	Tamil	Thanga Manasukkaran	Raja Varman		
25 October	Tamil	Raasukutti	K. Bhagyaraj		
1 February	Tamil	Chinna Thayee	Ganesh Raj		
5 September	Tamil	Maappillai Vandhaachu	Sasi Mohan		
13 April	Tamil	Singaravelan	R. V. Udayakumar	Manmathude Naa Mogudu (Telugu)	
12 April	Tamil	Innisai Mazhai	Shoba Chandrasekhar		
17 July	Tamil	Kalikaalam	Panchu Arunachalam		
20 November	Tamil	Onna Irukka Kathukanum	V. Sekhar		
3 September	Tamil	Thai Mozhi	R.R. Ilavarasan		
14 August	Tamil	Endrum Anbudan	Bhagyanathan		
	Telugu	Aa Okkati Adakku	E. V. V. Satyanarayana		Ilayaraja's only collaboration with EVV Sathyanarayana, The Soundtrack received good response.
14 February	Tamil	Unnai Vaazhthi Paadugiren	Sridev		
	Telugu	Aswamedham	K. Raghavendra Rao		
15 January	Tamil	Chinna Gounder	R. V. Udayakumar		
	Telugu	Chinarayudu	B. Gopal		Remake of the Tamil hit, Chinna Gounder.
16 April	Tamil	Bharathan	Sabapathy Dekshinamurthy		
	Telugu	Detective Narada	Vamsi		
	Telugu	Chakravyuham	Balu Mahendra	Vasanthame Varuga (Tamil)	
5 June	Tamil	Aavarampoo	Bharathan		
	Telugu	Dharma Kshetram	A. Kodandarami Reddy		
25 October	Tamil	Thevar Magan	Bharathan	Kshatriya Putrudu (Telugu)	600th Film Film selected as India's Choice for Official Entry to the Oscars in the Best Foreign Film Category. Blockbuster among 1992 Deepavali releases and completed 175-days run at the box office, Won 5 National Awards, Dubbed into Telugu under the title Kshatriya Putrudu, later remade into the Hindi film Virasat by Priyadarshan and in Kannada as Thandege Thakka Maga by S. Mahendar.
15 May	Tamil	Nadodi Pattukkaran	N.K.Viswanathan		
18 April	Tamil	Nadodi Thendral	Bharathiraja		
12 April	Tamil	Unna Nenachen Pattu Padichen	Guru Dhanapal		
13 March	Tamil	Naangal	Hassan		
	Telugu	Moratodu Naa Mogudu			Telugu remake of Tamil film En Rasavin Manasile
18 December	Tamil	Meera	P. C. Sreeram		
10 July	Tamil	Vaa Vaa Vasanthame	Pala Karuppiah		
11 September	Tamil	Deiva Vaakku	M.S.Madhu		
	Tamil	Puthiya Swarangal	Vijayan		Film went unreleased.

== 1993 ==
Date	Language	Film	Director	Dubbed	Notes
	Tamil	China Devan	T.K. Bose		
	Tamil	Periyamma	Bhanumathi Ramakrishna		Bilingual. Tamil version of Asadhyuralu
20 May	Malayalam	Jackpot	Jomon		
30 July	Tamil	Athma	Prathap Pothan		Ninaikkindra Paadhaiyil composed by Karthik Raja. Remaining soundtrack composed by Ilaiyaraaja.
20 August	Tamil	Thalattu	T.K.Rajendran		
14 January	Tamil	Maamiyar Veedu	S. Ganesaraj		
14 January	Tamil	Koyil Kaalai	Gangai Amaran		
15 October	Tamil	Dhuruva Natchathiram	Raja		
	Telugu	Amma Koduku	Kranthi Kumar		Remake of the Tamil film Senthamizh Paattu
	Telugu	Kunti Putrudu	Dasari Narayana Rao		
	Telugu	Asadhyuralu	Bhanumathi Ramakrishna		Bilingual. Also released in Tamil as Periyamma.
16 April	Tamil	Aranmanai Kili	Rajkiran		
16 October	Telugu	Tholi Muddhu	K. Reddy		
18 February	Tamil	Ejamaan	R. V. Udayakumar		
13 November	Tamil	Kilipetchu Ketkava	Fazil		
14 April	Tamil	Kalaignan	G. B. Vijay		
14 January	Tamil	Marupadiyum	Balu Mahendra		
16 April	Tamil	Ponnumani	R. V. Udayakumar		Background score done by Karthik Raja. Songs composed by Ilaiyaraaja.
9 April	Tamil	Pon Vilangu	K. S. Rajkumar		
5 February	Tamil	Rakkayi Koyil	Manivasagam		
24 June	Tamil	Uzhaipaali	P.Vasu		
14 January	Tamil	Walter Vetrivel	P.Vasu		
16 July	Tamil	Dharma Seelan	Seiyaru Ravi		
13 November	Tamil	Chinna Jameen	Raj Kapoor		
29 January	Tamil	Chinna Kannamma	R.Raghu		
14 January	Tamil	Chinna Mapillai	Santhana Bharathi	Chinna Alludu (Telugu)	
13 November	Tamil	Enga Muthalali	Liyakat Ali Khan		
9 April	Tamil	Enga Thambi	S. D. Saba	Allari Prema (Telugu)	
19 February	Tamil	Ezhai Jaathi	Liyakat Ali Khan		
12 February	Tamil	Manikuyil	Rajavarman		
15 October	Tamil	I Love India	Pavithran		
3 December	Tamil	Kathirukka Neramillai	Kulothungan		
25 June	Tamil	Kattalai	Liayakat Ali Khan		
5 March	Tamil	Maharasan	G. N. Rangarajan		
	Tamil	Naalai Engal Kalyanam	V.M.C. Hanifa		Later released as Kadalora Kadhal
23 October	Tamil	Parvathi Ennai Paradi	V. Sekhar		
21 May	Tamil	Porantha Veeda Puguntha Veeda	V. Sekhar		
	Telugu	Repaty Rowdy	K. Vasu		
10 June	Tamil	Sakkarai Devan	J. Panneer		Background score done by Karthik Raja. Songs composed by Ilaiyaraaja
4 June	Tamil	Thangakkili	Rajavarman		
15 August	Tamil	Udan Pirappu	P. Vasu		
16 April	Tamil	Ulle Veliye	R. Parthiepan		
14 April	Tamil	Uthama Raasa	Raj Kapoor		
August 20	Tamil	Valli	K. Natraj		

== 1994 ==
Date	Language	Film	Director	Dubbed	Notes
14 April	Tamil	Adharmam	Ramesh		
10 February	Tamil	Athiradi Padai	R. K. Selvamani		
13 January	Tamil	Amaidhi Padai	Manivannan		Background score by Karthik Raja. Songs composed by Ilaiyaraaja.
	Telugu	Allari Police	Narayana Rao Uppalapatti		
14 April	Tamil	Honest Raj	K. S. Ravi	Police Commando (Telugu)	
31 July	Tamil	Kanmani	R. K. Selvamani		
14 January	Tamil	Mahanadhi	Santhana Bharathi		
25 February	Tamil	Magalir Mattum	Singeetham Srinivasa Rao	Aadavallaku Matrame (Telugu)	
2 November	Tamil	Periya Marudhu	N.K. Viswanathan		
14 April	Tamil	Sakthivel	K. S. Ravikumar		
9 September	Tamil	Sathyavan	Raj Kapoor		Remake of the Telugu film, April 1 Vidudala
7 October	Tamil	Thendral Varum Theru	N.G. Gowri Manohar		
	Malayalam	Sammohanam	C.P. Padmakumar		Winner, Kerala State Film Award for Best Background Music
14 January	Tamil	Sethupathi IPS	P.Vasu		
22 July	Tamil	Sadhu	P. Vasu		
15 April	Tamil	Seeman	Raj Kapoor		
12 August	Tamil	Senthamizh Selvan	Manoj Kumar	Gharana Premikudu (Telugu)	
29 July	Tamil	Sevvanthi	P. S. Nivas		
12 August	Tamil	Thozhar Pandian	Manivannan		
14 April	Tamil	Veera	Suresh Krishna	Veera (Telugu)	
15 July	Tamil	Pudhupatti Ponnuthaayi	N.K. Viswanathan		
8 April	Tamil	Rasa Magan	Manivannan		
27 May	Tamil	Priyanka	Neelakanta		
14 January	Tamil	Rajakumaran	R. V. Udayakumar		
16 December	Tamil	Vanaja Girija	Keyaar		700th Film
14 January	Tamil	Veetla Visheshanga	K. Bhagyaraj		
15 July	Tamil	Vietnam Colony	Santhana Bharathi		

== 1995 ==
Date	Language	Film	Director	Dubbed	Notes
11 March	Tamil	Aanazhagan	Thiagarajan		
23 October	Tamil	Makkal Aatchi	R. K. Selvamani		
15 January	Tamil	Kattumarakaran	P. Vasu	Sagara Kanya (Telugu)	
14 May	Tamil	Mogamul	Gnana Rajasekaran		
11 March	Tamil	Chinna Vathiyar	Singeetham Srinivasa Rao		
23 October	Tamil	Chandralekha	Nambirajan		
1 December	Tamil	Ilaya Ragam	P. R. Devaraj		
24 February	Tamil	Muthu Kaalai	Gokula Krishnan		
9 June	Tamil	Avatharam	Nassar		
15 January	Tamil	Oru Oorla Oru Rajakumari	K. Bhagyaraj		
21 July	Tamil	Paattu Vaathiyar	T. P. Gajendran		
1 September	Tamil	Periya Kudumbam	K.S.Ravikumar		
11 May	Tamil	Nandhavana Theru	R. V. Udayakumar		
24 August	Tamil	Raasaiyya	Yaar Kannan	Kurradu Baboi (Telugu)	
10 March	Tamil	Raja Enga Raja	T. Vijayasingam		
15 February	Tamil	Raja Muthirai	R. K. Selvamani		Bilingual. Made in Telugu as Raja Mudra. Went unreleased.
5 August	Tamil	Rajavin Parvaiyile	Janaki Soundar		
10 February	Tamil	Paattu Padava	B. R. Vijayalakshmi		
15 September	Tamil	Kolangal	I. V. Sasi		
12 August	Tamil	Mayabazar	Keyaar		
14 April	Tamil	Ellame En Rasathan	Rajkiran		
15 January	Tamil	Sathi Leelavathi	Balu Mahendra	Sathi Leelavathi (Telugu)	
7 July	Tamil	Thedi Vandha Raasa	Bhoopathi Raja		

== 1996 ==
Date	Language	Film	Director	Dubbed	Notes
6 April	Malayalam	Kaalapani	Priyadarshan	Kaalapani (Telugu) Saza-E-Kala Pani (Hindi) Sirai Chaalai (Tamil)	Winner, Kerala State Film Award for Best Music Director
	Kannada	Nammoora Mandara Hoove	Sunil Kumar Desai		
6 December	Tamil	Poomani	Kalanjiyam		
9 February	Tamil	Nattupura Pattu	Kasthuri Raja		
	Malayalam	Man of the Match	Joshy Mathew		
5 April	Tamil	Irattai Roja	Keyaar		
	Kannada	Shiva Sainya	Shivamani		
	Hindi	Aur Ek Prem Kahani	Balu Mahendra		
	Kannada	Gulabi	S. Narayan		
7 June	Tamil	Katta Panchayathu	R. Raghu		
9 August	Tamil	Poovarasan	Gokula Krishna		
	Telugu	Sreekaram	C. Umamaheswara Rao		
10 November	Tamil	Vasantham	Geetha Krishna		

== 1997 ==
Date	Language	Film	Director	Dubbed	Notes
19 December	Tamil	Kadhalukku Mariyadhai	Fazil		Remake of Fazil's Malayalam hit, Aniathipravu.
27 June	Tamil	Devathai	Nassar	Mohini (Telugu)	
10 January	Telugu	Chinnabbayi	K. Viswanath		
	Malayalam	Guru	Rajiv Anchal		Film selected as India's Choice for Official Entry to the Oscars in the Best Foreign Film Category. The Background Score was conducted by Ilaiyaraaja using the Budapest Symphony Orchestra.
	Malayalam	Kaliyoonjal	Anil Babu		
	Malayalam	My Dear Kuttichathan	Jijo Punnoose	Chhota Chetan (Hindi)	Re-release of the Re-edited version of the original from 1984.
13 September	Malayalam	Oru Yathramozhi	Prathap Pothan		
	Kannada	Prema Raga Haadu Gelathi	Sunil Kumar Desai		
5 December	Tamil	Kadavul	Velu Prabhakaran		
22 August	Tamil	Raman Abdullah	Balu Mahendra		
5 December	Tamil	Thambi Durai	Senthilnathan		
30 October	Tamil	Themmangu Paattukaaran	Gangai Amaran		
30 October	Tamil	Vasuki	Kasthuri Raja		
	Telugu	Pellikodukku Ammabadanu	Kasthuri Raja		Bilingual. Telugu version of Vasuki
	Kannada	Bhoomi Geethe	Kesari Haravu		
	Tamil	Kanmani Nee Varai	Unknown		Film went unreleased.
	Tamil	Poonjolai	Gangai Amaran		Film went unreleased.
	Tamil	Punniyavathi	Subburaj		Film went unreleased.
	Tamil	Thenpandi Singam	Ilaiyabharathy		Film went unreleased.

== 1998 ==
Date	Language	Film	Director	Dubbed	Notes
	Tamil	Chinna Ramasamy Periya Ramasamy	R. V. Udayakumar		Film went unreleased.
30 November	Telugu	Antahpuram	Krishna Vamsi		
6 March	Tamil	Kangalin Vaarthaigal	Muktha S. Sundar		
3 June	Malayalam	Anuragakottaram	Vinayan		
31 July	Kannada	Hoomale	Nagathihalli Chandrashekar		
13 June	Telugu	Priyuralu	Bharathan		Also dubbed in Malayalam as Manjeeradhwani and in Tamil as Kanmani Oru Kavidhai
25 December	Tamil	Kadhal Kavithai	Agathiyan		
14 January	Tamil	Kizhakkum Merkkum	Kalanjiyam		
27 August	Malayalam	Kallu Kondoru Pennu	Shyamaprasad		Winner, Kerala State Film Award for Best Background Music
10 April	Tamil	Veera Thalattu	Kasthuri Raja		
9 July	Tamil	Dharma	Keyaar	Dubbed in Telugu as Vikram Dharma	
19 October	Tamil	Desiya Geetham	Cheran		
2 December	Tamil	Kannathal	Bharathi Kannan		
26 November	Tamil	Kumbakonam Gopalu	Keyaar		
13 April	Tamil	Kavalai Padathe Sagodhara	Keyaar		
10 July	Tamil	Poonthottam	Kalanjiyam		
11 September	Tamil	Senthooram	Sangaman		
4 December	Tamil	Thalaimurai	Saravana Pandiyan		
	Telugu	Vinalani Vundi	Ram Gopal Varma		Unreleased Project

== 1999 ==
Date	Language	Film	Director	Dubbed	Notes
10 December	Tamil	Sethu	Bala		
	Tamil	Bharani	S. Ganeshraj		Film went unreleased.
29 March	Tamil	Annan	Anu Mohan		
17 December	Tamil	Manam Virumbuthe Unnai	M. Sivachandran		
15 January	Tamil	Ponnu Veetukaran	P. Vasu		
15 January	Tamil	Thodarum	Ramesh Khanna		Remake of Telugu Film, Maavichiguru
30 November	Tamil	Anthapuram	Krishna Vamsi		Remake of the 1998 Telugu film, Antahpuram.
12 March	Tamil	Chinna Durai	R. Chandra		
15 January	Tamil	House Full	R. Parthiepan		
	Tamil	IPC 215 (Thuppu Koolikaran)	Charuhasan		
21 May	Tamil	Kummi Paattu	Kasthuri Raja		
	Telugu	Preminchedi Endukamma	Johnson		Songs from the Tamil Movie, Kadhalukku Mariyadhai.
April 12	Malayalam	Friends	Siddique		
1 October	Tamil	Mugam	Gnana Rajasekaran		
30 April	Tamil	Nilave Mugam Kaattu	Kalanjiyam		
1 May	Tamil	Rajasthan	R. K. Selvamani	Rajasthan	Made as a partial Bilingual. Released in Telugu under the same name.
3 December	Tamil	Time	Geetha Krishna	Time	Dubbed in Telugu under the same name.

== See also ==
Ilaiyaraaja 1970's	Ilaiyaraaja 1980's	Ilaiyaraaja 1990's	Ilaiyaraaja 2000's	Ilaiyaraaja 2010's	New
