= Ilaiyaraaja discography =

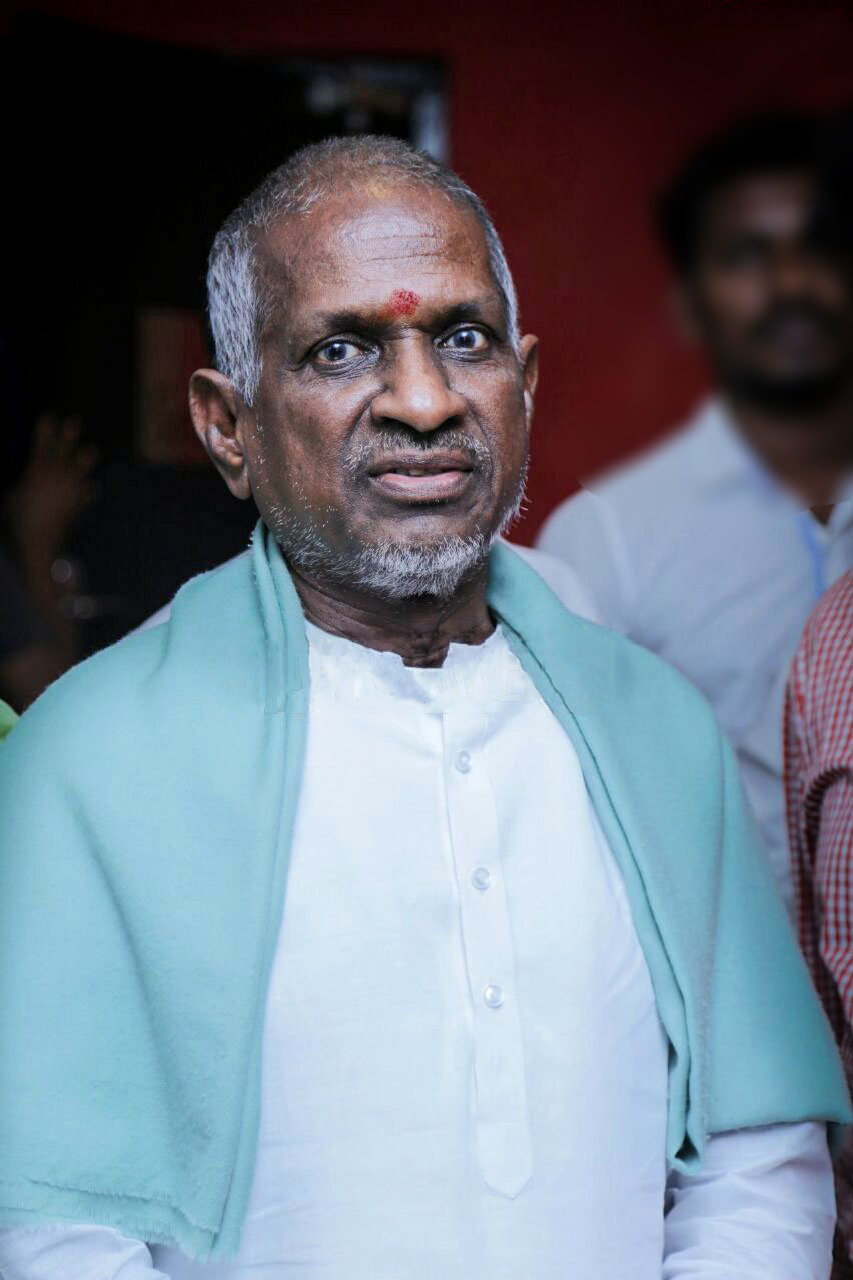
Ilaiyaraaja is a composer, conductor, singer, lyricist, and producer who has composed for more than 1000 films in Indian cinema. He is widely rated as one of the greatest composers Indian Film Music has ever seen.

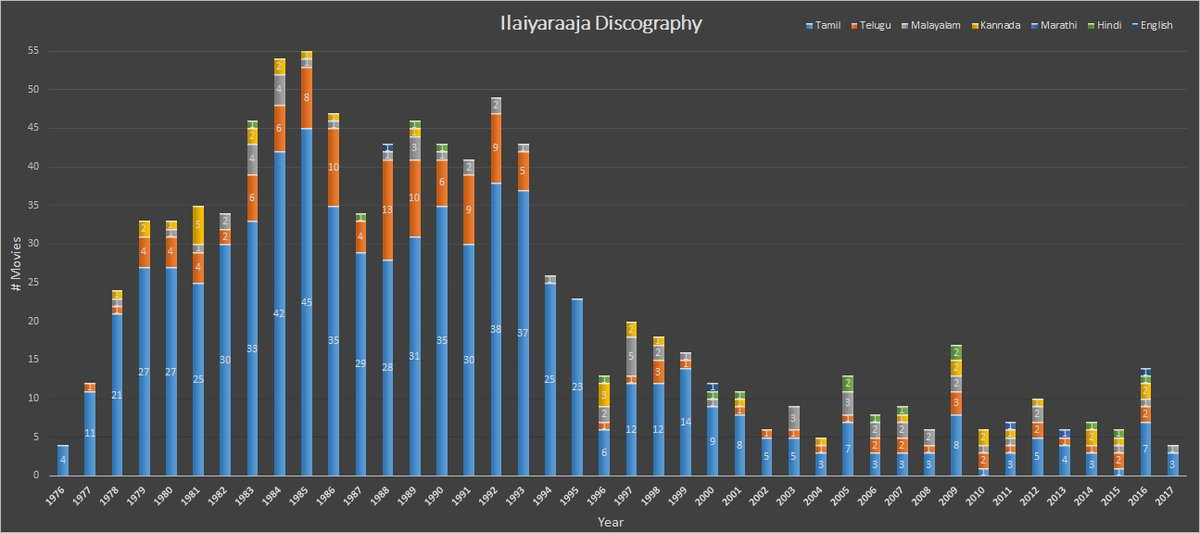
A graphical representation of Ilaiyaraaja's discography over the years with colours to represent languages

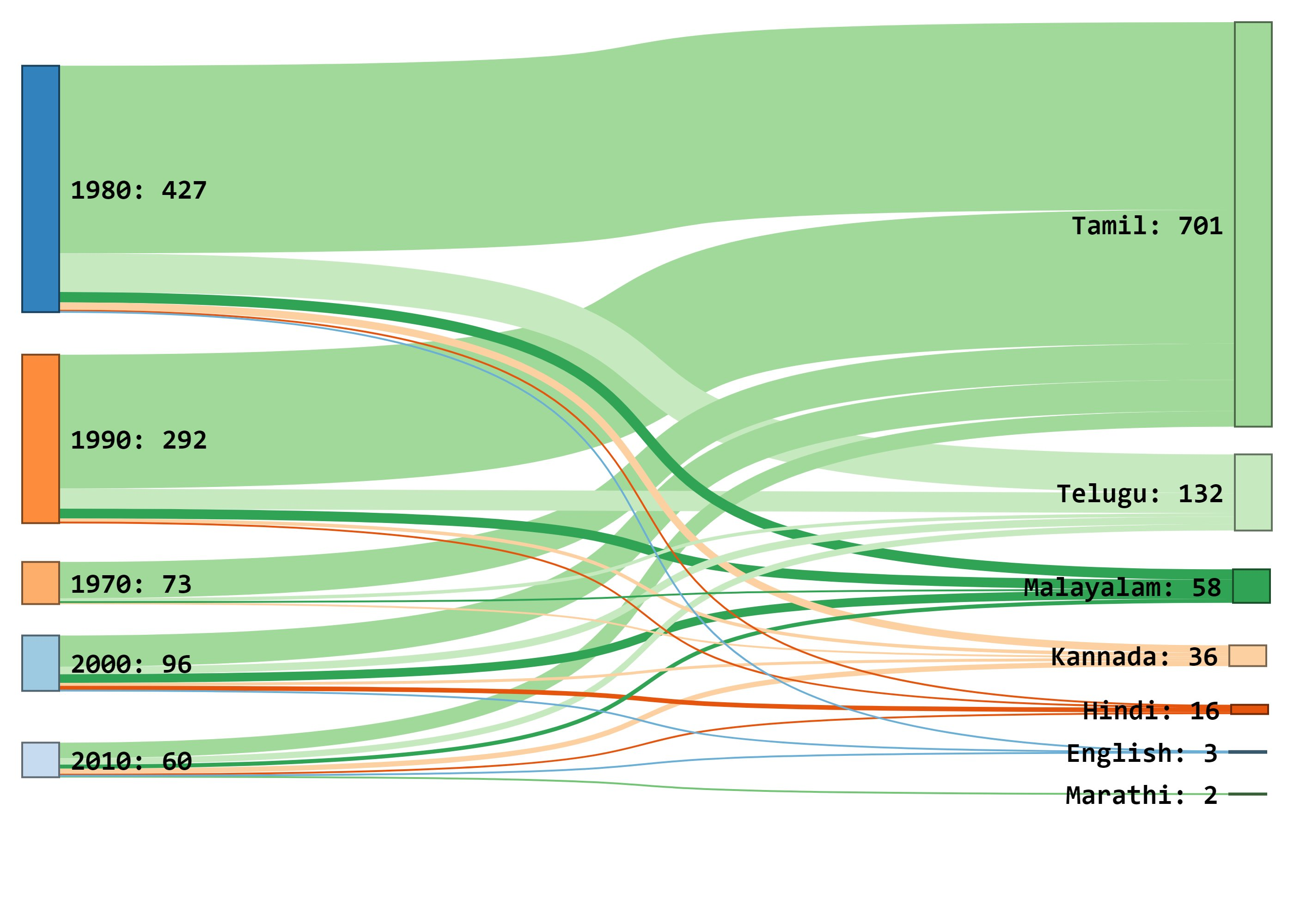
A graphical representation of the decadal split of a fairly accurate picture of the number of films Ilaiyaraaja has worked on vs the languages he has worked in

== Upcoming projects ==
The below list gives the upcoming/announced films composed by Ilaiyaraaja.

Year	Film	Cast	Director	Language	Status	Notes
2027	RBalki-IR		R. Balki	Tamil	Pre-Production	8 Songs
2027	Kadavul Thandha Parisu	Ramarajan	Kasimayan	Tamil	Pre-Production	
2027	Manjanathi		Mari Selvaraj	Tamil	Pre-Production	
2026	Dhasal	Lalit Prabhakar as Namdeo Dhasal	Varuna Madanlal Rana	Marathi	Post production	
2026	Thattuvandi	Master Raghavan, Vijayabhaskar	Vijayabhaskar	Tamil	Post production	
2026	Kadavulin Veetirkku Sellum Vazhi	Nassar	Dhanapal Padmanabhan	Tamil	Shooting in progree	
2026	A Beautiful Breakup	Thaksh, Matylda	Ajithvasan Uggina	English	Post-Production	
2024	Gift	Sandy	Alphonse Puthren	Tamil Malayalam	Delayed	
2024	Arisi	Ra Mutharasan, Samuthirakani	S A Vijaykumar	Tamil	Filming	
TBA
TBA	Thupparivaalan 2	Vishal	Vishal	Tamil	Filming	
TBA	Kadhal Sei		K Ganeshan	Tamil	Audio released	
TBA	Venjam Theerthaayadaa		Susi Ganesan	Tamil	Announced	
TBA	Munpadhivu		GM Durai Pandian	Tamil	Filming	
TBA	Chiranjeevi Ponniyin Selvan		Ajay Pratheeb	Tamil	Announced	Web Series
Delayed projects
2020	Ammayi	Vinay Rai, Varalaxmi	G.Shankar	Tamil	Delayed	
2016	Rajathandhiram 2	Veera	Senthil Veerasamy	Tamil	Delayed	
2015	Porkalathil Oru Poo		K. Ganeshan	Tamil	Music released	
2014	Raja Rajanin Porvaal	Snehan	R.S. Amudeshver	Tamil	Delayed/Songs recorded	
2013	Naadi Thudikkuthadi		Selva	Tamil	Music released	
2012	Mayamohitha Chandran	Kunchacko Boban		Malayalam	Delayed project	
2011	Thaandavakone		Subbu Sujatha	Tamil	Music released	
2011	Padithurai			Tamil	Delayed project	
2009	SRK	Manoj Joshi, Vinay Pathak	Ajoy Varma	Hindi	Unreleased	Remake of the Malayalam film Chinthavishtayaya Shyamala

== Albums (instrumental, non-film) ==
Year	Album	Notes
1992	Honnina Therinali	First devotional album of Ilaiyaraaja in Kannada
1992	Geetha Vazhipaadu	First devotional album of Ilaiyaraaja in Tamil, also written by him, with 9 songs on the major Hindu deities
1981-82	Geethanjali	Devotional album on the major Hindu deities, written by Ilaiyaraaja and Vaali, with 9 songs
1986	How to Name It?	A crossover album fusing the sensibilities of Western classical music's Baroque music style, mastered by Johann Sebastian Bach and Carnatic classical music's raga virtuosity, mastered by Tyagaraja, into a collection of 10 mesmeric tracks
1988	Nothing but Wind	A crossover album featuring the famed Hindustani flautist Hariprasad Chaurasia playing the flute to Ilaiyaraaja's compositions combining the finer sensibilities of the Classical period of Western classical music mastered by Mozart and Indian folk, Hindustani, Carnatic and light music for some meditative, playful, reflective tracks
1992	Vedic Chanting	Produced by Ilaiyaraaja with selected hymns from the Rig Veda and Purusha Sukta
1992	The Secret of Ramayana	Select verses from Valmiki and Kamban's Ramayana tuned and produced by Ilaiyaraaja, in addition to verses from the Vedas and Upanishads
1993	Symphonic Work in 5 movements with the Royal Philharmonic Orchestra, London	Conducted by John Scott. Recorded by Tony Faulkner at the Walthomstow Town Hall, London in June 1993. Produced by Mike Townend.
1994	Ilaiyaraaja's Classicals on the Mandolin	Carnatic classical music album with four krithis and a varnam, all written and composed by Ilaiyaraaja, including one Sanskrit krithi in a raga discovered by Ilaiyaraaja himself, Raajalahiri, with a forward speech by the Carnatic music legend Semmangudi Srinivasa Iyer, played on the Mandolin by the late Mandolin legend, U. Srinivas.
1995	RAID-Music for dance production of Shobana Jeyasingh Dance Co., London	Based on the Indian game of kabaddi
1995	India 24 Hours	Documentary on India, filmed by 18 famed photojournalists, who selected a spot each across the length and breadth of India, and filmed the passions and dreams of Indians across 100 hours. The two-hour documentary has a musical score by Ilaiyaraaja.
2000	Raajavin Ramanamalai	First devotional album on Ramana Maharishi, also written by Ilaiyaraaja, with 10 songs
2002	Amma Paamaalai	Devotional album on the goddess Parvathi
2005	Thiruvasagam	Symphonic oratorio on Manickavasagar's Thiruvasagam, a crossover album that seeks to blend Thiruvasagam's bhakti with the finer elements of Western classical music's symphonic movements. Conducted by Laszlo Kovacs, performed by the Budapest Symphony Orchestra and recorded in Budapest.
2006	Guru Ramana Geetam	Second devotional album on Ramana Maharishi, with two krithis, one in Sanskrit and dedicated to Ramanar's mother, also written by Ilaiyaraaja, among 10 songs
2007	The Music Messiah	Collection of background scores from his landmark score for the Malayalam film Guru
2007	Sri Ramana Naadha Amudham	Third album on Ramana Maharishi, with 10 songs, with 6 songs written by Vaali (poet) and 4 songs written by Ilaiyaraaja, and composed by the veteran composer M.S. Viswanathan.
2008	Manikantan Geet Mala	Devotional album on Swami Ayyappa, in Tamil, Telugu, Kannada and Malayalam
2009	Annamalai Ramanaandi	Devotional album on Ramana Maharishi. Songs written by Muruganaar and Sadhu Om. Rendered by Ramananjali group led by Sulochana Natarajan and Ilaiyaraaja.
2009	Namratha Ke Sagar	Single song, composed by Ilaiyaraaja for a bhajan written by Mahatma Gandhi, sung by Pandit Bhimsen Joshi and Pandit Ajoy Chakraborty and recited on screen by Amitabh Bachchan
2010	Ramana Saranam	Fourth devotional album on Ramana Maharishi, with a krithi in Telugu among 10 songs, all written and composed by Ilaiyaraaja
2010	Baba Pugazh Maalai	Devotional album on Shirdi Sai Baba
2011	Akkah	Short film in Kannada on the Kannada poet-saint Akka Mahadevi with songs rendered by Bombay Jayashri
2013	Ramana Aaram	Fifth devotional album (Volume 1 & Volume 2) on Ramana Maharishi, also written by Ilaiyaraaja, with 16 songs
2015	Swappnam	Classical album composed for a dance drama on Lord Shiva choreographed by dancer Krithika Subramaniam, with 10 songs on the CD, collected from Thiruvasagam, Thevaram, Nandanar Charitham, Adi Sankara's Ardhanarishwara Ashtakam among other devotional hymns dedicated to Shiva. Sudha Raghunathan, T. V. Gopalakrishnan, Rajhesh Vaidhya, Abhishek Raghuram, Bharath Sundar, composer Sharreth, A. K. Palanivel, Palaghat Sreeram, Embar Kannan were among the musicians who were part of the project.
2016	Thaarai Thappattai (Original Background Score)	Collection of background scores from his National Award-winning score for his 1000th milestone film Tharai Thappattai. Contains 19 songs.
2017	Raaja's Ramanamalai	Sixth devotional album (new 2017 album) on Ramana Maharishi, brought by Sri Thenandal Films, also written by Ilaiyaraaja, with 10 songs
2020	Bharath Bhoomi	Tribute to COVID-19 warriors (Hindi & Tamil)
2024	Divya Pasurams	Seventh devotional album, Eight pasurams have been chosen for the album from the 4,000 verses of the Nalayira Divya Prabhandham, written by the 12 Alwars.

== Television ==
- 1991 Penn
- 2008 Namma Kudumbam
- 2008 Thekkathi Ponnu

== Books ==
- Sangeethakkanavukal
- Gyanaganga
- Yaarukku Yaar Ezhudhuvadhu
- Paal Nilaa Paadhai
- Enaku Ethuvo Unakum Athuve

== Ad jingles ==
Hindustan Coca-Cola collaborated with Ilaiyaraaja for its ad jingles. This is the first time Raja has done a commercial jingle.

Country Delight collaborated with Ilaiyaraaja for an ad.

- Idea Cellular (used "Naguva nayana" Kannada song from Pallavi Anupallavi)
- Malabar Gold and Diamonds

Many of Ilaiyaraaja's songs were used as jingles in advertisements. Filmmaker R Balki has used them in many of his ads either as a musical note or a jingle composed to the same tune.

== Onscreen appearances ==
Year	Movie title	Notes
1980	Nizhalgal	Singer in the song "Madai Thiranthu"
1985	Dharmapathini	Guest appearance in the song "Naan Thedum
1986	Saadhanai	Guest appearance in the song "O Vanambadi"
1989	Pudhu Pudhu Arthangal	Guest appearance in the song "Kalyanamaalai"
1989	Karagattakaran	Guest appearance in the title song "Paattaalae Buddhi"
1991	Kumbakarai Thangaiah	Guest appearance in the song "Ennai Oruvan Paada Chonnaan"
1992	Villu Pattukaran	Guest appearance in the temple donation screen between 11:50 and 14:50
1998	Kannathal	Guest appearance in the song "Amman Pugazhai"
2009	Azhagar Malai	Guest appearance in the song "Ulagam Ippo"
2013	Naadi Thudikkudhadi	Guest appearance in the song "Kadhale Illaadha Desam"

== Reused tracks ==
=== Remake films ===
Most are Telugu remakes of Tamil films.

- Bhadrakali (1977) from Bhadrakali (1976)
- Vayasu Pilichindi (1978) from Ilamai Oonjal Aadukirathu (1978)
- Kotha Jeevithalu (1981) from Puthiya Vaarpugal (1979)
- Pasidi Moggalu (1980) from Uthiripookkal (1979)
- Veerabhadrudu (1984) from Kozhi Koovuthu (1982)
- Kala Rudrudu (1985) from Komberi Mookan (1984)
- Mangalya Bandham (1985) from Naan Paadum Paadal (1984)
- Manchi Manasulu (1986) from Vaidehi Kathirunthal (1984)
- Aradhana (1987) from Kadalora Kavithaigal (1986)
- Asthulu Anthasthulu (1988) from Muthal Vasantham (1986)
- Unnal Mudiyum Thambi (1988; Tamil) from Rudraveena (1988; Telugu) (6 songs)
- Menamama (1988) from Kanni Rasi (1985)
- Mr. Bharath (1989) from Mr. Bharath (1986)
- Idem Pellam Baboi (1990) from Manamagale Vaa (1988)
- Guru Sishyulu (1990) from Guru Sishyan (1988) (4 songs reused)
- Chanti (1992) from Chinna Thambi (1991)
- Chinarayudu (1992) from Chinna Gounder (1992)
- Moratodu Naa Mogudu (1992) from En Rasavin Manasile (1991)
- Amma Koduku (1993) from Senthamizh Paattu (1992)
- Sathyavan (1994) from April 1 Vidudala (1991)
- Namma Preethiya Ramu (2003; Kannada) from Kasi (2001) (4 tunes reused)

=== Other films ===
Apart from remake films, Ilaiyaraaja has reused the following tracks:

Original version				Remade version				Notes and Ref.
Year	Film/Album	Song	Language	Year	Film/Album	Song	Language	Notes and Ref.
1978	Kaatrinile Varum Geetham	"Chithirai Sevvanam"	Tamil	1991	April 1 Vidudala	"Chukkalu Themanna"	Telugu	
1978	Maathu Tappada Maga	"Bhaanu Bhoomiya"	Kannada	1979	Agal Vilakku	"Edho Ninaivugal"	Tamil	
1980	Johnny	"Kaatril Endhan Geetham"	Tamil	1986	Aur Ek Prem Kahani	"Naina Bole"	Hindi	
1980	Johnny	"Aasaiya Kaathula"	Tamil	2013	Gundello Godari	"Raathri"	Telugu	
1980	Johnny	"Aasaiya Kaathula"	Tamil	2015	Shamitabh	"Stereophonic Sannata"	Hindi	
1980	Nizhalgal	"Dhoorathil Naan Kanda"	Tamil	1984	Sitaara	"Vennello Godari"	Telugu	Only present in the film's soundtrack
1981	Geetha	"Keladi Nimageega"	Kannada	1983	Aayiram Nilave Vaa	"Devathai Ilam Devi"	Tamil	
1981	Geetha	"Nanna Jeeva"	Kannada	1984	Unnai Naan Santhithen	"Devan Thandha"	Tamil	
1981	Geetha	"Jotheyali"	Kannada	1984	Nooravathu Naal	"Vizhiyile Mani Vizhiyil"	Tamil	
1981	Geetha	"Jotheyali"	Kannada	2007	Cheeni Kum	"Jaane Do Na"	Hindi	
1981	Geetha	"Santhoshakke"	Kannada	1984	Kairasikkaran	"Adichikko Site Adichikko"	Tamil	
1981	Alaigal Oivathillai	"Kaadhal Oviyam"	Tamil	1986	Aur Ek Prem Kahani	"Meri Zindagi"	Hindi	
1981	Alaigal Oivathillai	"Putham Pudhu Kaalai"	Tamil	2009	Paa	"Halke Se Bole"	Hindi	
1982	Auto Raja	"Sangathil Paadatha"	Tamil	1982	Olangal	"Thumbi Vaa"	Malayalam	
1982	Auto Raja	"Sangathil Paadatha"	Tamil	1986	Nireekshana	"Aakasam Eenatidho"	Telugu	
1982	Auto Raja	"Sangathil Paadatha"	Tamil	1996	Aur Ek Prem Kahani	"Monday Tho Utkar"	Hindi	
1982	Auto Raja	"Sangathil Paadatha"	Tamil	2009	Paa	"Gumm Summ Gumm"	Hindi	
1983	Mann Vasanai	"Pothi Vacha Malliga"	Tamil	1986	Aur Ek Prem Kahani	"Hona Hai Tho"	Hindi	
1983	Sadma	"Hey Zindagi"	Hindi	1984	Thambikku Endha Ooru	"En Vaazhvile"	Tamil	
1983	Aayiram Nilave Vaa	"Andharangam Yaavume"	Tamil	1988	Abhinandana	"Manchu Kurise"	Telugu	
1984	Unaroo	"Theeram Thedi Olam Padi"	Malayalam	1984	Komberi Mookan	"Roja Ondru Mutham Ketkum"	Tamil	
1984	Enakkul Oruvan	"Ther Kondu Sendravan"	Tamil	1984	Onnanu Nammal	"Vaalittezhuthiya Neelakadakannil"	Malayalam	
1984	Nilavu Suduvathillai	"Naalum En Manam"	Tamil	1988	Abhinandana	"Premaledani"	Telugu	
1984	Nilavu Suduvathillai	"Naalum En Manam"	Tamil	2023	Vattara Vazhakku	"Premai Enathu Oor"	Tamil	
1985	Anbin Mugavari	"Uyire Urave Ondru Naan"	Tamil	1985	Anveshana	"Ilalo"	Telugu	
1985	Anbin Mugavari	"Uyire Urave Ondru Naan"	Tamil	1988	Abhinandana	"Eduta Neeve"	Telugu	
1985	Thendrale Ennai Thodu	"Pudhiya Poovithu"	Tamil	1991	Coolie No. 1	"Kotha Kothaga"	Telugu	
1985	Naane Raja Naane Mandhiri	"Mayanginen Solla Thayanginen"	Tamil	2007	Anumanaspadam	"Prathidhinam Nee Dharshanam"	Telugu	
1985	Mudhal Mariyadhai	"Andha Nilava"	Tamil	1989	Mahaadev	"Mujhe Baahon"	Hindi	
1985	Amudha Gaanam	"Ore Raagam"	Tamil	1988	Abhinandana	"Ade Neevu"	Telugu	
1985	Amudha Gaanam	"Velli Nila Padhumai"	Tamil	1988	Abhinandana	"Rangulalo Kalavu"	Telugu	
1986	Mouna Ragam	"Mandram Vantha Thendralukku"	Tamil	2007	Cheeni Kum	"Cheeni Kum"	Hindi	
1986	Mella Thirandhathu Kadhavu	"Kuzhaloodum Kannanukku"	Tamil	2007	Cheeni Kum	"Baatein Hawa"	Hindi	
1987	Enga Ooru Pattukaran	"Madurai Marikozhundhu"	Tamil	1990	Jagadeka Veerudu Athiloka Sundari	"Yamaho Nee Yama"	Telugu	
1987	Enga Ooru Pattukaran	"Shenbagame"	Tamil	1993	Aa Okkati Adakku	"Paavurama"	Telugu	
1987	Enga Ooru Pattukaran	"Shenbagame"	Tamil	1989	Mahaadev	"Chand Hai Tu"	Hindi	
1987	Enga Ooru Pattukaran	"Jinjinakku Janakku"	Tamil	1988	Varasudochadu	"Jamchakku"	Telugu	
1987	Maharshi	"Maatarani Mounamidi"	Telugu	1988	Shenbagamae Shenbagamae	"Manja Podi"	Tamil	
1989	Adharvam	"Puzhoyarathil"	Malayalam	1990	Engitta Mothathay	"Sariyo Sariyo"	Tamil	
1989	Karakattakkaran	"Maanguyilae"	Tamil	2004	Shiva Shankar	"Endhirayyo"	Telugu	
1991	Dharma Durai	"Maasi Maasam"	Tamil	1992	Dharma Kshetram	"Enno Ratrulosthayi Gani"	Telugu	
1995	Avatharam	"Thendral Vanthu"	Tamil	2015	Yevade Subramanyam	"Challa Galli"	Telugu	
1997	Kaliyoonjal	"Manikuttikkurumbulla"	Malayalam	1998	Kumbakonam Gopalu	"Oru Nandavanam"	Tamil	
1997	Kadhalukku Mariyadhai	"Ennai Thaalattu Varuvala"	Tamil	1999	Preminchedi Endukamma	"Chinni Paadala Chilukamma"	Telugu	
1997	Kadhalukku Mariyadhai	"Aanantha Kuyilin Paattu"	Tamil	1999	Preminchedi Endukamma	"Manasu Koila Paata"	Telugu	
1997	Kadhalukku Mariyadhai	"Oru Pattampoochi"	Tamil	1999	Preminchedi Endukamma	"O Sita Koka Chiluka"	Telugu	
1997	Kadhalukku Mariyadhai	"Oh Baby"	Tamil	1999	Preminchedi Endukamma	"Oh Baby"	Telugu	
1997	Kadhalukku Mariyadhai	"Ayya Veedu Therandhuthan"	Tamil	1999	Preminchedi Endukamma	"Chinthalapudi Chilakara"	Telugu	
2000	Kochu Kochu Santhoshangal	"Kodamanjin Thaazhvarayil"	Malayalam	2002	Ninu Choodaka Nenundalenu	"Kondapalli"	Telugu	
2002	En Mana Vaanil	"Enna Solli"	Tamil	2002	Ninu Choodaka Nenundalenu	"Jaaji Malli Thottalona"	Telugu	
2005	Adhu Oru Kana Kaalam	"Kaattu Vazhi"	Tamil	2009	Paa	"Mere Paa"	Hindi	
