= Nilavu Suduvathillai =

- Theatrical release poster
- Directed by: K. Rangaraj
- Screenplay by: K. Rangaraj
- Produced by: S. M. G. Mani; T. N. R.
- Starring: Sivakumar; Radhika; N. Viswanathan; V. Gopalakrishnan
- Cinematography: Dinesh Babu
- Edited by: T. Thirunavukkarasu
- Music by: Ilaiyaraaja
- Production company: Rajarajeswari Cini Arts
- Release date: 18 May 1984
- Running time: 128 minutes
- Country: India
- Language: Tamil

Nilavu Suduvathillai (transl. The moon does not burn one) is a 1984 Indian Tamil-language film, directed by K. Rangaraj. The film stars Sivakumar, and Radhika in the lead roles, N. Viswanathan and V. Gopalakrishnan. It was released on 18 May 1984.

== Plot ==
Ravi falls in love with Radhika. Soon his love turns to sadness when he learns that she is his boss's daughter, masquerading as an ordinary girl only to assess his suitability as her partner.

== Cast ==
- Sivakumar
- Radhika
- N. Viswanathan
- V. Gopalakrishnan
- Goundamani
- Kallapetti Singaram
- Ramanathan
- Usilaimani
- Paranjothi
- Kullamani
- Parthasarathy
- Cenchi Krishnan
- Muthu Bharathi
- Pushpalatha
- Arundhathi
- Y. Vijaya
- Gemini Rajeswari
- Sathya

== Production ==
The film was launched along with song recording at Prasad Studios in 1983. The song "Paari Jaadham" was filmed in February 1984.

== Soundtrack ==
The music was composed by Ilaiyaraaja. This was his first collaboration with Rangaraj. The song "Naalum En Manam" was reused twice by him: as "Prema Ledhani" for Telugu film Abhinandana (1988) and again in Tamil as "Premai Enathu Oor" for Vattara Vazhakku (2023).

Song	Singers	Lyrics	Length
"Paari Jaadham"	K. J. Yesudas, S. Janaki	Muthulingam	04:12
"Raathiri Poovadai"	S. Janaki	Vairamuthu	03:53
"Naalum En Manam"	K. J. Yesudas, S. Janaki, G. K. Vidya	Pulamaipithan	04:20
"Poove Pani Poove"	S. Janaki	M. G. Vallabhan	04:16
"Kovai Palamea Kovama"	Malaysia Vasudevan	Pulamaipithan	04:36
