= Lenin Pandiyan =

- Theatrical release poster
- Directed by: D. D. Balachandran
- Written by: D. D. Balachandran
- Produced by: Sendhil Thyagarajan; Arjun Thyagarajan
- Starring: Gangai Amaran; Roja Selvamani; Dharshan Ganesan; Shrrita Rao
- Cinematography: A. M. Edwin Sakay
- Edited by: Nagooran Ramachandran
- Music by: Ilaiyaraaja
- Production company: Sathya Jyothi Films
- Release date: 25 September 2026
- Running time: 141 minutes
- Country: India
- Language: Tamil

Lenin Pandiyan is a 2026 Indian Tamil-language crime drama film written and directed by D. D. Balachandran in his debut and produced by Sathya Jyothi Films. The film stars Gangai Amaran, Roja Selvamani, Dharshan Ganesan and Shrrita Rao. It is the acting debut of Dharshan, and the debut of Amaran in a leading role. Photographed by A. M. Edwin Sakay and edited by Nagooran Ramachandran, it was released on 25 September 2026.

== Plot ==
In rural Tamil Nadu, an ageing farmer named Durairasu and a young police constable Maravarman Sundarapandian become embroiled in a conspiracy involving an illegal sand mining operation.

== Cast ==
- Gangai Amaran as Durairasu
- Roja Selvamani as Sandhanam
- Dharshan Ganesan as Maravarman Sundarapandian
- Shrrita Rao as Priya
- George Maryan as Beemarao
- Aadukalam Naren
- Yugendran as Ravi
- Bose Venkat
- Archana Ravichandran as Podhum Ponnu

== Production ==
Lenin Pandiyan is the directorial debut of D. D. Balachandran, and the acting debut of Dharshan Ganesan, son of actor/producer Ramkumar Ganesan. It is also the debut for Gangai Amaran in the lead role. Roja Selvamani signed on the film which was meant to be her comeback to Tamil cinema, before Anbe Diana (2026) ended up becoming her comeback. Cinematography was handled by A. M. Edwin Sakay and editing by Nagooran Ramachandran. The film was primarily shot on location near Manamadurai.

== Soundtrack ==
The music is composed by Ilaiyaraaja. The first single "Unnai Nambi" was released on 27 April 2026, and the second single "Sarkarey Solliruchu" on 18 May. The third single "Pandi Muni Kukkudhu" was scheduled to release on 30 August 2026, but was postponed to the next day. The complete album, consisting of five tracks, was released on 1 October 2026.

All lyrics are written by Ilaiyaraaja.

Track listing
| No. | Title | Singer(s) | Length |
|---|---|---|---|
| 1. | "Unnai Nambi" | Shweta Mohan |
| 2. | "Sarkarey Solliruchu" | S. P. Charan, Mukesh Mohamed |
| 3. | "Pandi Muni Kukkudhu" | Ilaiyaraaja |
| 4. | "Etta Nadandha" | Jithin Raj, Ananya Bhat |
| 5. | "Unnai Nambi" (version 2) | Vibhavari Apte Joshi |

== Release ==
Lenin Pandiyan was released in theatres on 25 September 2026. In late August, the Tamil Film Producers Council (TFPC) and the Tamil Film Active Producers Association (TFAPA), due to a dispute with film distributors and exhibitors, announced that Tamil films cannot release or complete filming or post-production works from 1 September 2026 onwards, leading to the release of Lenin Pandiyan facing uncertainty. However, a week later, the decision was reversed, allowing Lenin Pandiyan to release as planned. The film began streaming on Amazon Prime Video from 16 October.

== Reception ==
Abhinav Subramanian of The Times of India wrote, "As far as debut films go, Lenin Pandiyan is quite a commendable effort with strong writing. But the execution shows the lack of finesse that often marks first attempts, which prevents the film from turning out to be a stronger film". News Today called the film's writing its "biggest strength", also appreciating the cast performances and music but criticised the romantic portions and final act, adding that "Despite these limitations, Lenin Pandiyan remains a commendable debut that chooses substance over formula". Maalai Malar appreciated the film primarily for the cast performances, music and cinematography. Rakesh Thara of ABP Nadu too praised these aspects but felt the screenplay was derivative in many scenes and slow-paced in others. Ashwin S of Cinema Express wrote, "In its exploration of shame, which impacts a man's day even in the smallest of moments, the film achieves its core focus of being ideally strong. But the weight of immaculate focus, drags this story to be half complete".
