= Kairasikkaran =

1984 film directed by SSK Shankar

- Theatrical release poster
- Directed by: SSK Shankar
- Screenplay by: Peter Selvakumar
- Story by: Ra. Ki. Rangarajan
- Produced by: SSK Sannasi
- Starring: Prabhu; Radha; Silk Smitha
- Cinematography: D. D. Prasad
- Edited by: B. Lenin; V. T. Vijayan
- Music by: Ilaiyaraaja
- Production company: SKS Films
- Release date: 1 June 1984
- Country: India
- Language: Tamil

Kairasikkaran (transl. The man with the midas touch) is a 1984 Indian Tamil-language film directed by SSK Shankar for SKS Films. The film stars Prabhu and Radha. It was released on 1 June 1984.

== Cast ==
- Prabhu as Vijay
- Radha as Rekha
- Silk Smitha as Asha
- Manorama as Parrmala
- Senthamarai as Janarathan
- Vinu Chakravarthy as Kaataa Muthu
- Vennira Aadai Moorthy as Doctor Kamatchi
- Sivachandran as Soori

== Production ==
This was the debut production venture of S. S. K. Films. The film was launched at Prasad Studios. The song "Adichiko Site" was recorded on that day.

== Soundtrack ==
The soundtrack was composed by Ilaiyaraaja. The song "Adichikko Site Adichikko" was adapted from Ilaiyaraaja's song "Santhoshakke" from the 1981 Kannada film Geetha. The song "Nilavondru" which is set in Pahadi raga attained popularity.

Song	Singers	Lyrics
"Adichikko Site Adichikko"	Malaysia Vasudevan	Vairamuthu
"Hey Raja Kadikatheenga"	S. Janaki	Vairamuthu
"Kai Veesum"	S. P. Balasubrahmanyam, S. Janaki	Vairamuthu
"Nilavondru"	S. P. Balasubrahmanyam, S. Janaki	Vairamuthu
"Oomai Megame"	Ilaiyaraaja	Vairamuthu
"Then Sumandha"	S. P. Balasubrahmanyam, S. Janaki	Pulamaipithan
