= Onnanu Nammal =

- Directed by: P. G. Vishwambharan
- Screenplay by: John Paul
- Story by: Kaloor Dennis
- Starring: Mammootty; Mohanlal; Seema; Adoor Bhasi
- Cinematography: Ramachandra Babu
- Edited by: G. Murali
- Music by: Songs: Ilaiyaraaja; Score: Guna Singh
- Production company: AMK Cine Arts
- Distributed by: Century Release
- Release date: 26 December 1984
- Running time: 115 nm
- Country: India
- Language: Malayalam

Onnanu Nammal (transl. We are one) is a 1984 Indian Malayalam-language film directed by P. G. Vishwambharan and written by John Paul. The film is inspired by a story of Kaloor Dennis. The film stars Mammootty, Seema, Mohanlal and Adoor Bhasi. The film has music composed by Ilaiyaraaja and Guna Singh with the former composing the songs and latter, the film score.

== Plot ==
Nandagopal meets Seetha and follows her to her house with his best friend, who is also Seetha's cousin. She stays with her father, elder sister Nirmala, her husband Sethu and their daughter Sony. Nirmala is pregnant with their second child.

He gets acquainted to her family and manages to get their marriage fixed. Two days before their marriage, while returning from Sony's birthday party, Nandu meets with an accident and unfortunately dies.

The whole family mourns for the loss, to rub salt in the wound, Nirmala has a miscarriage and due to complications gets paralysed and is bedridden. Even the doctor tell Sethu that there is no hope of her coming back to a normal life. Due to pressure from his own father, Nirmala's family and the fact that his daughter needs a mother, Sethu marries Seetha with silent consent from Nirmala.

Everything goes smooth until one fine day Nirmala starts showing signs of coming back to normal life. Seetha upon realising that Nirmala prefers to die rather than coming between Sethu and Seetha, commits suicide.

== Cast ==
- Mammootty as Sethu
- Mohanlal as Nanda Gopal
- Poornima Jayaram as Seetha
- Seema as Nirmala
- Adoor Bhasi as Padmanabhan Nair
- Baby Shalini as Sonykutty
- Manianpilla Raju
- Meena as Karthyayaniamma
- Thilakan as Surendran, Sethu's father
- Sukumari as Dr. Rachel

== Soundtrack ==
The music was composed by Ilaiyaraaja with lyrics by Bichu Thirumala.

No.	Song	Singers	Lyrics	Length (m:ss)
1	"Kalkkandam Chundil"	K. J. Yesudas, S. Janaki	Bichu Thirumala	
2	"Kuppinipattaalam"	K. J. Yesudas, Krishnachandran	Bichu Thirumala	
3	"Vaalittezhuthiya"	K. J. Yesudas, S. Janaki	Bichu Thirumala	

== view the film ==
- ONNANU NAMMAL MALAYALAM MOVIE
