= How to Name It? =

Studio album by Ilaiyaraaja
- Released: 1986
- Length: 48 Minutes

Ilaiyaraaja chronology
How to Name It?	Nothing But Wind

How to Name It? (1986) is an instrumental Indian-Western fusion album by Ilaiyaraaja. This was Ilayaraaja's first fusion music album. The album has musical movements that are dedicated to Tyagaraja, a religious musician and composer from South India (1767–1847) and the Western baroque music composer, J. S. Bach (1685–1750) of Germany.

One of the tracks is based on Preludium in E by Johann Sebastian Bach.

The song "Chamber Welcomes Thiyagaraja" was composed in classical guitar based on Kamavardhini Raga. This piece is considered one of the difficult pieces composed for classical guitar based on Indian raga.

== Track listing ==
1. "How to Name It?" (7:22)
2. "Mad Mod Mood Fugue" (2:01)
3. "You Cannot Be Free" (5:31)
4. "Study for Violin" (1:38)
5. "It Is Fixed" (5:04)
6. "Chamber Welcomes Thiyagaraja" (5:49)
7. "I Met Bach in My House" (7:16)
8. "And We Had a Talk" (1:34)
9. "Don't Compare" (8:08)
10. "Do Anything" (5:21)
