= Tamil Nadu State Film Award for Best Music Director =

Indian film award

The Tamil Nadu State Film Award for Best Music Director is given by the Tamil Nadu state government as part of its annual Tamil Nadu State Film Awards for Tamil (Tamil Movie Industry) feature films. A. R. Rahman has won the award a record seven times.

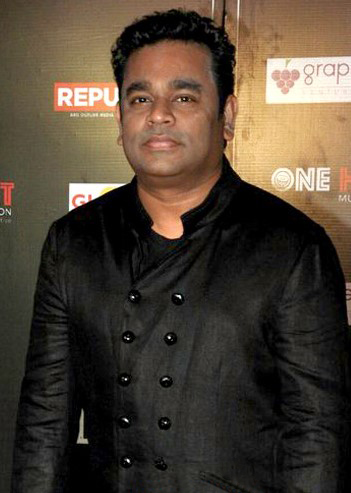
A. R. Rahman Latest winner (PS:1)

== Superlatives ==
Wins	Recipient(s)
7	A. R. Rahman
6	Ilaiyaraaja
3	M.S. Viswanathan, Deva, Harris Jayaraj
2	Yuvan Shankar Raja, Vidyasagar

== Recipients ==
Here is a list of the award winners and the films for which they won.

Year	Music director	Film
2022	A. R. Rahman	Ponniyin Selvan: I
2021	Sean Roldan	Jai Bhim
2020	G. V. Prakash Kumar	Soorarai Pottru
2019	S. Thaman	Magamuni
2018	Santhosh Narayanan	Vada Chennai
2017	Hiphop Tamizha	Kavan
2016	Sam C. S.	Puriyatha Puthir
2015	Ghibran	Uttama Villain & Papanasam
2014	A. R. Rahman	Kaaviya Thalaivan
2013	Ramesh Vinayakam	Ramanujan
2012	D. Imman	Kumki
2011	Harris Jayaraj	Ko
2010	Yuvan Shankar Raja	Paiyya
2009	Sundar C. Babu	Nadodigal
2008	Ilaiyaraaja	Ajantha
2007	Vidyasagar	Mozhi
2006	Yuvan Shankar Raja	Pattiyal
2005	Harris Jayaraj	Anniyan, Ghajini
2004	Srikanth Deva	M. Kumaran Son Of Mahalakshmi
2003	Harris Jayaraj	Kaaka Kaaka
2002	Sirpi	Unnai Ninaithu
2001	Vidyasagar	Dhill, Thavasi & Poovellam Un Vasam
2000	Deva	Khushi
1999	A. R. Rahman	Sangamam,Mudhalvan
1998	Bobby	Sollamale
1997	S. A. Rajkumar	Suryavamsam
1996	A. R. Rahman	Minsaara Kanavu
1995	Deva	Aasai
1994	A. R. Rahman	Kaadhalan
1993	A. R. Rahman	Gentleman
1992	A. R. Rahman	Roja
1991	M. M. Keeravani	Azhagan
1990	Deva	Vaigasi Poranthachu
1989	Ilaiyaraaja	Varusham Padhinaaru
1988	Ilaiyaraaja	Agni Natchathiram
1982	M. S. Viswanathan	Agni Sakshi
1981	Ilaiyaraaja	Alaigal Oivathillai
1980	Ilaiyaraaja	Nizhalgal
1979	Shankar–Ganesh	Panam Penn Paasam
1978	M. S. Viswanathan	Varuvan Vadivelan
1977	Ilaiyaraaja	16 Vayathinile
1970	Kunnakudi Vaidyanathan	Thirumalai Thenkumari
1969	K. V. Mahadevan	Adimai Penn
1968	M. S. Viswanathan	Lakshmi Kalyanam

== See also ==
- Tamil cinema
- Cinema of India
