= Thambikku Entha Ooru =

1984 film by Rajasekhar

- Poster
- Directed by: Rajasekhar
- Written by: Panchu Arunachalam
- Produced by: Meena Panchu Arunachalam
- Starring: Rajinikanth; Maadhavi; Sulakshana
- Cinematography: V. Ranga
- Edited by: R. Vittal
- Music by: Ilaiyaraaja
- Production company: P. A. Art Productions
- Distributed by: KR Enterprises
- Release date: 20 April 1984
- Running time: 136 minutes
- Country: India
- Language: Tamil

Thambikku Entha Ooru (transl. Which town are you from, brother?) is a 1984 Indian Tamil-language romantic comedy film directed by Rajasekhar and written by Panchu Arunachalam. The film stars Rajinikanth, Maadhavi and Sulakshana. It revolves around a spoilt rich man who is forced to live in a village for one year to learn discipline. The film was released on 20 April 1984 and became a box office success. It was later remade in Kannada as Anjada Gandu (1988).

== Plot ==
Balu is a carefree young man with a lavish lifestyle and a tendency to get into conflicts whenever he perceives injustice. Born to a wealthy father, Chandrasekhar, Balu's reckless behaviour worries his father. To teach him discipline, Chandrasekhar sends Balu to his friend, Gangadharan, an ex-military man, in the village of Uthama Palayam. The condition is that Balu must work for Gangadharan for one year and keep his true identity as Chandrasekhar's son a secret.

In the village, Balu gradually adjusts to the hard work and rural life, forming a strong bond with Gangadharan and his family. During his stay, he clashes with Sumathi, an arrogant, wealthy girl who assumes Balu is a poor villager. They spar verbally and, over time, develop a mutual affection for each other.

Gangadharan's daughter, Azhagi, who also has feelings for Balu, is heartbroken upon discovering that Balu loves Sumathi. She agrees to marry a man of her father's choosing. Meanwhile, Sumathi's father, who had initially agreed to marry her off to a wealthy partner's son, withdraws the proposal at the request of Sumathi. This infuriates the partner, who kidnaps Sumathi to forcefully marry her.

Balu rescues Sumathi, leaving her under the protection of Azhagi and her suitor. However, the suitor betrays his trust, handing Sumathi back to the villainous partner and his son. In a dramatic showdown, Balu defeats the partner and returns Sumathi to her father.

Having learned the values of hard work and discipline from Gangadharan, Balu decides to leave the village. The film concludes with Sumathi and her father visiting Balu's house to discuss their future, where Sumathi is surprised to find Balu, now transformed, standing in front of her in a formal suit.

== Cast ==
- Rajinikanth as Balu
- Madhavi as Sumathi
- Sulakshana as Azhagi
- Senthamarai as Gangadharan
- V. S. Raghavan as Chandrasekhar, Balu's Father
- Vinu Chakravarthy as Velu Manikkam
- Srikanth as Rajadurai
- Nizhalgal Ravi as Chandran
- Janagaraj as Ramaiya
- Master Vimal as Gopi
- Ennathe Kannaiah as Muniyandi
- Vani as Kannatha
- Kovai Sarala as Sarala
- Sathyaraj as Sivaraman
- T. K. S. Natarajan as Pichandi
- Omakuchi Narasimhan as Subbiah

== Production ==
The film was initially titled Naane Raja Neeye Manthiri (transl. I am the king, you are the minister). It was the first of several collaborations between Rajinikanth and Rajasekhar.

== Soundtrack ==
The soundtrack was composed by Ilaiyaraaja and the lyrics were written by Panchu Arunachalam. The song "Aasaikliye" is based on the Carnatic raga Arabhi, while "Kadhalin Deepam Ondru" is based on the Charukesi raga. Ilaiyaraaja was hospitalised after a hernia surgery and therefore unable to sing, so he composed this song by whistling and sent the notes to his studio. During the recording and rehearsals, Ilaiyaraaja would be available over phone to make corrections, and when the song's singers S. P. Balasubrahmanyam and S. Janaki were recording, they practised the whole tune and sang it over the phone while Ilaiyaraaja made the necessary corrections. The song "En Vaazhvile" is based on "Aye Zindagi Gale Lagale" from Sadma (1983). In May 2015, the FM radio station, Radio City, commemorated Ilaiyaraaja's 72nd birthday by broadcasting the composer's songs in a special show titled Raja Rajathan for 91 days. "Kadhalin Deepam Ondru" was one of the most requested songs on the show.

Track listing
No.	Title	Singer(s)	Length
1.	"Aasai Kiliye"	Malaysia Vasudevan	04:24
2.	"En Vaazhvile Varum Anbe Vaa"	S. P. Balasubrahmanyam	04:49
3.	"Kaathalin Deepam Ondru" (Male)	S. P. Balasubrahmanyam	04:36
4.	"Kaathalin Deepam Ondru" (Female)	S. Janaki	04:30
5.	"Kalyaana Mela Saththam"	S. Janaki	05:09
Total length:			23:28

== Reception ==
Ananda Vikatan rated the film 43 out of 100.
