= Vattara Vazhakku =

2023 Indian film by Kannusamy Rajendran

- Theatrical release poster
- Directed by: Kannusamy Rajendran
- Starring: Santhosh Nambirajan; Raveena Ravi; Vijay Sathya
- Cinematography: Suresh Maniyan
- Edited by: Venkat Rajen
- Music by: Ilaiyaraaja
- Release date: 29 December 2023
- Country: India
- Language: Tamil

Vattara Vazhakku (transl. Local dialect) is a 2023 Indian Tamil-language directed by Kannusamy Rajendran starring Santhosh Nambirajan, Raveena Ravi and Vijay Sathya and the music composed by Ilaiyaraaja. It was theatrically released on 29 December 2023.

== Cast ==
- Santhosh Nambirajan as Sengai Maaran
- Raveena Ravi as Thotichi
- Vijay Sathya

== Production ==
The film was shot in a village named Thodaneri near Madurai.

== Soundtrack ==
The soundtrack was composed by Ilaiyaraaja.

Vattara Vazhakku

Soundtrack album by Ilaiyaraaja
- Released: 2023
- Genre: Feature film soundtrack
- Length: 8:36
- Language: Tamil
- Producer: Ilaiyaraaja

Ilaiyaraaja chronology
Margazhi Thingal (2023)	Vattara Vazhakku (2023)	Ninaivellam Neeyada (2024)
External audio
- Vattara Vazhakku – Jukebox on YouTube

All lyrics are written by Ilaiyaraaja.

Track listing
No.	Title	Singer(s)	Length
1.	"Thai Piranthal Indru"	Jithin Raj, Srinisha Jayaseelan	4:12
2.	"Premai Enathu Oor"	Karthik Raja	4:24
Total length:			8:36

== Reception ==
=== Critical response ===
Jayabhuvaneshwari B from Cinema Express wrote "Illaiyarajaa's music for the film, which is expected to be the cherry on top, is only par for the course. Probably to satisfy the tragic end, the film is overloaded with violence and bloodshed that makes us uncomfortable". A reviewer of The Times of India says "The Kannusamy Rajendran film is not one of those films that's dead on arrival, but it progresses to be way less impactful than what it set out to be". A reviewer of Times Now says "Standing out as a film that ponders the consequences of seeking vengeance, the Kannusamy Rajendran directorial's lack to build up its characters as well storyline was its ultimate downfall". A reviewer of Kalki wrote "The story of the film takes place in the period of 1987. Some of the songs composed by Raja during this period are played in the background from time to time. This is also good. Suresh's cinematography captures the warmth of Karisal forest". A reviewer of Ananda Vikatan says "But due to the absence of an interesting screenplay and screenplay to justify this, this local case is boring the audience".
