= List of Tamil films of 1973 =

Post-amendment to the Tamil Nadu Entertainments Tax Act 1939 on 1 April 1958, Gross jumped to 140 per cent of Nett Commercial Taxes Department disclosed ₹12.93 crore in entertainment tax revenue for the year.

The following is a list of films produced in the Tamil film industry in India in 1973, in alphabetical order.

== 1973 ==
Title	Director	Production	Music	Cast
Alaigal	C. V. Sridhar	Chithralaya	M. S. Viswanathan	Vishnuvardhan, Chandrakala, Cho, Manorama, Thengai Seenivasan, Surulirajan
Amman Arul	Pattu	Ambika Movies	Shankar–Ganesh	Jaishankar, A. V. M. Rajan, Manjula, Thengai Srinivasan, K. A. Thangavelu
Anbu Sagodharargal	Lakshmi Deepak	Jayanthi Films	K. V. Mahadevan	Jaishankar, S. V. Ranga Rao, A. V. M. Rajan, Major Sundarrajan, Jamuna, Devika, Vennira Aadai Nirmala, Prameela, Cho, V. K. Ramasamy, Manorama
Arangetram	K. Balachander	Kalakendra Films	V. Kumar	Prameela, Sivakumar, S. V. Subbaiah, M. N. Rajam, Shashikumar, Kamal Haasan, Jayachitra, Jayasudha
Baghdad Perazhagi	T. R. Ramanna	Ganesh Creations	M. S. Viswanathan	Jayalalitha, Ravichandran, Savitri, Major Sundarrajan, Nagesh, Shubha, Jayasudha, Thengai Srinivasan, Sachu
Bharatha Vilas	A. C. Tirulokchandar	Cine Bharath Productions	M. S. Viswanathan	Sivaji Ganesan, K. R. Vijaya, Major Sundarrajan, Devika, V. K. Ramasamy, M. R. R. Vasu, Manorama, Rajasulochana, Shashikumar, Sivakumar, Jayasudha, Jayachitra
Deiva Kuzhandhaigal	S. P. Muthuraman	Victory Movies	V. Kumar	Jaishankar, Jaya, R. Muthuraman, Kumari Padmini, Manorama, 'Baby' Sridevi, 'Master' Ramu, Srikanth
Dheivaamsam	K. Vijayan	Jayam Combines	Shankar–Ganesh	A. V. M. Rajan, Chandrakala, P. R. Varalakshmi, Shashi Kumar, Sundarrajan, Thengai Seenivasan, Sachu
Engal Thaai	Malliyam Rajagopal	Malliyam Productions	M. S. Viswanathan	Savitri, A. V. M. Rajan, Vennira Aadai Nirmala, Srikanth, Thengai Srinivasan, Manorama, Kumari Padmini, V. Gopalakrishnan, Udaya Chandrika
Engal Thanga Raja	V. B. Rajendra Prasad	Jagapathy Art Pictures	K. V. Mahadevan	Sivaji Ganesan, Manjula, Sowcar Janaki, Nagesh
Ganga Gowri	B. R. Panthulu	Padmini Pictures	M. S. Viswanathan	Gemini Ganesan, Jayalalitha, Jayanthi, Sivakumar, Kumari Padmini, Cho, Thengai Srinivasan, Manorama
Gauravam	Vietnam Veedu Sundaram	Vietnam Movies	M. S. Viswanathan	Sivaji Ganesan, Ushanandini, Pandari Bai, Nagesh, Major Sundarrajan, Rama Prabha, Jayakumari
Iraivan Irukkindran	H. S. Venu	Maha Ganapathy Films	Shankar–Ganesh	Jaishankar, Jaya
Jesus Dubbed from Malayalam	P. Thomas	Thomas Pictures Unit	Joseph krishna, M. S. Viswanathan, Allepey Ranganathan	Muralidas, Gemini Ganesan, Thikkurissy Sukumaran Nair, Jayalalithaa, Jayabharathi, M. N. Nambiar
Karaikkal Ammaiyar	A. P. Nagarajan	Eveeyaar Films	Kunnakudi Vaidyanathan	K. B. Sundarambal, R. Muthuraman, Lakshmi, Sivakumar, Srividya, Kumari Padmini, Suruli Rajan, Manorama
Kasi Yathirai	S. P. Muthuraman	Sri Devi Cine Arts	Shankar–Ganesh	Srikanth, Jaya, V. K. Ramasamy, Cho, Manorama, Thengai Srinivasan, Suruli Rajan, Kumari Padmini
Kattila Thottila	Malliyam Rajagopal	Arul Films	V. Kumar	Gemini Ganesan, P. Bhanumathi, Kalpana, Sivakumar, Thengai Srinivasan, Manorama, Master Sekhar, Master Ramu
Komatha En Kulamatha	M. A. Thirumugam	Dhandayudhapani Films	Shankar–Ganesh	Prameela, Srikanth, Nagesh, M. Bhanumathi, Thengai Srinivasan
Malai Naattu Mangai	P. Subramaniam	Rani Productions	Vedpaul Sharma	Gemini Ganesan, Vijayasree, Shashi Kumar Cho, C. L. Ananthan,
Malligai Poo	N. S. Maniam	Geethalayaa Productions	V. Kumar	R. Muthuraman, K. R. Vijaya, Srikanth, Prameela, Thengai Srinivasan
Manidharil Manikkam	C. V. Rajendran	Vasanth Movies	M. S. Viswanathan	Sivaji Ganesan, A. V. M. Rajan, Prameela, Cho, Manorama, Suruli Rajan
Manipayal	A. Jagannathan	Selvi Enterprises	M. S. Viswanathan	A. V. M. Rajan, Jayanthi, Master Sekhar, Baby Indira, V. K. Ramasamy, Thengai Srinivasan, Manorama
Manjal Kungumam	Pattu	Kumudhum Productions	Shankar–Ganesh	Ravichandran, Sheela, Savitri, Thengai Srinivasan, Manorama
Maru Piravi	T. R. Ramanna	Vijaya & Suri Combines	T. R. Pappa	R. Muthuraman, Manjula, S. A. Ashokan, Thengai Srinivasan
Nalla Mudivu	C. N. Shanmugham	Poongothai Pictures	M. S. Viswanathan	Gemini Ganesan, Jayanthi, R. Muthuraman, Venniradai Nirmala, Cho, Manorama, Thengai Srinivasan, R. S. Manohar
Nathayil Muthu	K. S. Gopalakrishnan	Chitra Productions	Shankar–Ganesh	K. R. Vijaya, R. Muthuraman, S. V. Subbaiah, S. Varalakshmi
Nee Ullavarai	C. V. Ramana	Padma Enterprises		A. V. M. Rajan, Kumari Padmini, Pandari Bai
Nyayam Ketkirom	C. V. Rajendran	A. L. S. Productions	K.V.Mahadevan	R. Muthuraman, A. V. M. Rajan, Vennira Aadai Nirmala, Kanchana, Nagesh
Pasa Deepam	Pattu	Raja Rathna Productions	M.S.Viswanathan	A. V. M. Rajan, Manjula, Sowcar Janaki
Pattikaattu Ponnaiya	B. S. Ranga	Vasanth Pictures	K. V. Mahadevan	M. G. Ramachandran, Jayalalitha, Rajasree, Nagesh, Thengai Srinivasan
Pennai Nambungal	B. V. Srinivasan	Suchithra Films	V. Kumar	A. V. M. Rajan, Jayanthi, Sivakumar, Jayachitra, Nagaiah, Thengai Seenivasan
Petha Manam Pithu	S. P. Muthuraman	Victory Movies	V. Kumar	Savitri, R. Muthuraman, Jaya, Srikanth, A. Sakunthala, Cho, Manorama, Suruli Rajan, Jayasudha, Major Sundarrajan
Ponnunjal	C. V. Rajendran	Gomathy Shankar Pictures	M. S. Viswanathan	Sivaji Ganesan, Ushanandini, R. Muthuraman, Cho, Manorama, M. N. Nambiar
Ponnukku Thanga Manasu	Devaraj–Mohan	Arun Prasad Movies	G. K. Venkatesh	Sivakumar, Vijayakumar, Jayachitra, Vidhubala, K. A. Thangavelu, M. R. R. Vasu, Manorama
Ponvandu	N. S. Maniam	Maniam Pictures	V. Kumar	Jaishankar, Bharathi, Ushanandini, Jayachitra, Cho, Thengai Srinivasan, Sachu, Manorama, Suruli Rajan
Pookkari	Krishnan–Panju	Anjugam Pictures	M. S. Viswanathan	M. K. Muthu, Manjula, Vennira Aadai Nirmala, Jayachitra, Thengai Srinivasan, Jayakumari
Prarthanai	Kaushikan	Chitra Lok Productions	T. K. Ramamoorthy	A. V. M. Rajan, Vennira Aadai Nirmala, Sowcar Janaki, Cho, Thengai Srinivasan, Manorama
Radha	A. C. Tirulokchandar	Nahata Productions	Shankar-Ganesh	R. Muthuraman, Prameela, Rani Chandra, Nagesh
Rajaraja Cholan	A. P. Nagarajan	Anand Movies	Kunnakudi Vaidyanathan	Sivaji Ganesan, R. Muthuraman, Lakshmi, C. R. Vijayakumari, S. Varalakshmi, Sivakumar, Kumari Padmini, T. R. Mahalingam, Seerkazhi Govindarajan, Suruli Rajan, Manorama
Rajapart Rangadurai	P. Madhavan	Chitramala Combines	M. S. Viswanathan	Sivaji Ganesan, Ushanandini, Jaya, Srikanth, Sasikumar, Kumari Padmini, Suruli Rajan, Manorama, M. N. Nambiar
School Master	B. R. Panthulu	Padmini Pictures	M. S. Viswanathan	Gemini Ganesan, Sowcar Janaki, Srikanth, Rajasree, Cho, Thengai Srinivasan, Rama Prabha, M. N. Nambiar
Shanmugapriya	K. Krishnamurthy	Sri Chitra Mahal Productions	Jaya-Vijaya	R. Muthuraman, Jayanthi, Cho, Suruli Rajan, Manorama
Sollathaan Ninaikkiren	K. Balachander	Udhayam Productions	M. S. Viswanathan	Sivakumar, S. V. Subbaiah, Kamal Haasan, Jayachitra, Srividya, Shubha, Jayasudha
Sondham	A. C. Tirulokchandar	Amudham Pictures	M. S. Viswanathan	R. Muthuraman, K. R. Vijaya, Prameela, Sivakumar, V. K. Ramasamy, Suruli Rajan
Suryagandhi	V. Srinivasan	Vidhya Films	M. S. Viswanathan	Jayalalitha, R. Muthuraman, Savitri, Major Sundarrajan, Cho, Manorama
Thalai Prasavam	M. Krishnan	Sri Guruvayoorappan Productions	M. S. Viswanathan	Jaishankar, Lakshmi, Nagesh
Thedi Vandha Lakshmi	G. R. Nathan	Modern Theatres	M. S. Sanjay	Jaishankar, Lakshmi, A. Sakunthala, Thengai Srinivasan, Manorama, Jayakumari
Thirumalai Deivam	A. P. Nagarajan	Shanthi Combines	Kunnakudi Vaidyanathan	Gemini Ganesan, R. Muthuraman, A. V. M. Rajan, Sivakumar, K. B. Sundarambal, S. Varalakshmi, Lakshmi, Srividya, C. R. Vijayakumari, T. R. Mahalingam, Sukumari, Pushpalatha, Suruli Rajan, Manorama, Sachu
Ulagam Sutrum Valiban	M. G. Ramachandran	Em. Gee. Yaar. Pictures	M. S. Viswanathan	M. G. Ramachandran, Chandrakala, Manjula, Latha, Nagesh
Vaayadi	Madurai Thirumaran	Kasi Pictures	M. S. Viswanathan	Jaishankar, K. R. Vijaya, A. Sakunthala, Cho, Manorama, V. K. Ramasamy, Major Sundarrajan
Vakkuruthi	Mohan Gandhiram	Kadhirvel Murugan Films	Shankar–Ganesh	Jaishankar, Vennira Aadai Nirmala, Major Sundarrajan, Cho Ramaswamy, Thengai Srinivasan
Valli Deivanai	Thillai Raghavan	Thyagam Pictures	N. S. Thyagarajan	Ravichandran, Prameela, Shashikumar, M. Bhanumathi, S. Varalakshmi
Vandhaale Magaraasi	K. S. Gopalakrishnan	Ashok Pictures	Shankar–Ganesh	Jaishankar, Jayalalitha, Cho, M. N. Rajam, Pushpalatha
Veettu Mappillai	A. K. Subramaniam	Sakthi Films	A. M. Rajah	Savitri, A. V. M. Rajan, Prameela, Kumari Padmini, J. P. Chandrababu, Thengai Srinivasan, Sachu
Veettukku Vandha Marumagal	R. Vittal	Sri Navaneetha Films	Shankar–Ganesh	A. V. M. Rajan, Ravichandran, Vennira Aadai Nirmala, Latha, Cho, Manorama
Vijaya	Vietnam Veedu Sundaram	Jupiter Art Movies	G. Devarajan	Jaishankar, Lakshmi, Shubha, Major Sundarrajan, S. V. Suppiah, Surulirajan
