= List of Tamil films of 1970 =

Post-amendment to the Tamil Nadu Entertainments Tax Act 1939 on 1 April 1958, Gross jumped to 140 per cent of Nett Commercial Taxes Department disclosed ₹8.62 crore in entertainment tax revenue for the year.

The following is a list of films produced in the Tamil film industry in India in 1970, in alphabetical order.

== 1970 ==
Title	Director	Production	Music	Cast
Anadhai Anandhan	Krishnan–Panju	Muthuvel Movies	K. V. Mahadevan	A. V. M. Rajan, Jayalalitha, Master Sekhar, R. Muthuraman, Nagesh, Thengai Srinivasan
CID Shankar	R. Sundaram	Modern Theatres	Vedha	Jaishankar, CID Sakunthala, Thengai Srinivasan, C. L. Ananthan, Manohar, O.A.K. Devar
Dharisanam	V. T. Arasu	Senthoor Films	Soolamangalam Rajalakshmi	A. V. M. Rajan, Pushpalatha, Cho, Manorama, G. Sakunthala
Ethirkalam	M. S. Solaimalai	Thanigaivel Pictures	M. S. Viswanathan	Gemini Ganesan, Jaishankar, Padmini, Vanisri, Nagesh
En Annan	P. Neelakantan	Venus Pictures	K. V. Mahadevan	M. G. Ramachandran, Jayalalitha, R. Muthuraman, Vijaya Nirmala, Cho
Enga Mama	A. C. Tirulokchandar	Jayaar Movies	M. S. Viswanathan	Sivaji Ganesan, Jayalalitha, Vennira Aadai Nirmala, Cho, Rama Prabha
Engal Thangam	Krishnan–Panju	Mekala Pictures	M. S. Viswanathan	M. G. Ramachandran, Jayalalitha, A. V. M. Rajan, Pushpalatha, Cho, Thengai Srinivasan, Manorama
Engirundho Vandhaal	A. C. Tirulokchandar	Sujatha Cine Arts	M. S. Viswanathan	Sivaji Ganesan, Jayalalitha, K. Balaji, Devika, Nagesh, Rama Prabha, M. Bhanumathi
Ethiroli	K. Balachander	Navarathna Movies	K. V. Mahadevan	Sivaji Ganesan, S. S. Rajendran, K. R. Vijaya, Nagesh, Sivakumar, Lakshmi
Jeevanadi	A. K. Subramanyam	Sri Vinayaka Movies	V. Dakshinamoorthy	Ravichandran, Lakshmi
Kadhal Jothi	Thirumalai–Mahalingam	Mani Malar Films	T. K. Ramamoorthy	Jaishankar, Ravichandran, Kanchana, M. Bhanumathi, Nagesh, Sachu
Kalam Vellum	M. Karnan	Indhrani Films	Shankar–Ganesh	Jaishankar, C. R. Vijayakumari, Nagesh, Vijaya Lalitha, V. Nagaiah,
Kalyana Oorvalam	K. S. Sethumadhavan	Asiatic Pictures	R. Parthasarathy	Nagesh, K. R. Vijaya, Manimala, Sundarrajan, Srikanth, Surulirajan
Kann Malar	Pattu	Ganesh Movies	K. V. Mahadevan	Gemini Ganesan, Sowcar Janaki, B. Saroja Devi, Nagesh, Asogan, Manorama, V. K. Ramasamy,
Kannan Varuvan	I. N. Murthy	Devaalayam	Shankar–Ganesh	Jaishankar, R. Muthuraman, Lakshmi, Vennira Aadai Nirmala, Vijaya Lalitha, J. P. Chandrababu, Thengai Srinivasan, Major Sundarrajan, R. S. Manohar
Kasturi Thilakam	Malliyam Rajagopal	Kavitha Arts	G. Devarajan	Sowcar Janaki, Major Sundarrajan, Nagesh, Sivakumar, Lakshmi, Srividya
Kaviya Thalaivi	K. Balachander	Selvi Films	M. S. Viswanathan	Gemini Ganesan, Sowcar Janaki, Ravichandran, M. R. R. Vasu, V. S. Ragavan
Kumara Sambhavam	P. Subramaniam	Merry Land Pictures	G. Devarajan	Gemini Ganesan, Padmini, Rajasree, Srividya
Maanavan	M. A. Thirumugam	Dhandayuthapani Films	Shankar–Ganesh	Jaishankar, Sowcar Janaki, Lakshmi, R. Muthuraman, Nagesh, Sachu
Malathi	K. S. Gopalakrishnan	Chitra Productions	M. S. Viswanathan	Gemini Ganesan, B. Saroja Devi, Ravichandran, Major Sundarrajan, S. Varalakshmi, Nagesh, Ushanandini
Mattukkara Velan	P. Neelakantan	Jayanthi Films	K. V. Mahadevan	M. G. Ramachandran, Jayalalitha, Lakshmi, Cho, Sachu
Nadu Iravil	S. Balachander	S. B. Creations	S. Balachander	S. Balachander, Sowcar Janaki, Major Sundarrajan, Cho
Namma Kuzhandaigal	Srikanth	Vijaya Suresh Combines	M. S. Viswanathan	Major Sundarrajan, Pandari Bai, Master Sridhar, Baby Roja Ramani, Master Krishnakumar, T. K. Bagavathy, K. A. Thangavelu, G. Sakunthala, C. K. Saraswathi
Namma Veettu Deivam	G. N. Velumani	Kamakshi Agencies	Kunnakudi Vaidyanathan	R. Muthuraman, K. R. Vijaya, Nagesh, T. S. Balaiah, V. S. Raghavan, Vijaya Lalitha, Thengai Srinivasan
Navagraham	K. Balachander	Arul Films	V. Kumar	Nagesh, Major Sundarrajan, R. Muthuraman, Srikanth, Ragini, G. Sakunthala, Rama Prabha
Nilave Nee Satchi	P. Madhavan	S. P. Pictures	M. S. Viswanathan	Jaishankar, K. R. Vijaya, R. Muthuraman, Manimala, K. A. Thangavelu
Noorandu Kalam Vazhga	K. Sampath	S. V. S. Pictures	K. V. Mahadevan	A. V. M. Rajan, Kanchana, Vennira Aadai Nirmala
Paadhukaappu	A. Bhimsingh	Sunbeam Productions	M. S. Viswanathan	Sivaji Ganesan, Jayalalitha, Nagesh, J. P. Chandrababu, Sundarrajan, Nambiar
Patham Pasali	K. Balachander	Alangudi Movies	V. Kumar	Gemini Ganesan, Nagesh, Rajasree, Vijaya Lalitha, Sachu, Jayakumari
Penn Deivam	M. A. Thirumugam	Dhandayuthapani Films	V. Kumar	Jaishankar, Padmini, Lakshmi, R. Muthuraman, Nagesh
Raman Ethanai Ramanadi	P. Madhavan	Arun Prasad Movies	M. S. Viswanathan	Sivaji Ganesan, K. R. Vijaya, R. Muthuraman, M. Bhanumathi
Sangamam	Dada Mirasi	Chiara Films	T. K. Ramamoorthy	Gemini Ganesan, K. R. Vijaya, Vennira Aadai Nirmala, Nagesh
Snehidi	G. Ramakrishnan	Sudha Movies	S. M. Subbaiah Naidu	Gemini Ganesan, B. Saroja Devi, Ravichandran, Bharathi, Cho, Manorama
Sorgam	T. R. Ramanna	Sri Vinayaka Pictures	M. S. Viswanathan	Sivaji Ganesan, K. R. Vijaya R. Muthuraman, Nagesh, Rajasree, Vijaya Lalitha
Thabalkaran Thangai	K. S. Gopalakrishnan	Ravi Productions	K. V. Mahadevan	Gemini Ganesan, Vanisri, Nagesh, R. Muthuraman
Thalaivan	P. A. Thomas; Singamuthu	Thomas Pictures	S. M. Subbaiah Naidu	M. G. Ramachandran, Vanisri, Nagesh, Nambiar, Asogan, Jothy Lakshmi, O.A.K. Devar
Thedi Vandha Mappillai	B. R. Panthulu	Padmini Pictures	M. S. Viswanathan	M. G. Ramachandran, Jayalalitha, Cho Jothy Lakshmi, Asogan
Thirumalai Thenkumari	A. P. Nagarajan	Sri Vijayalakshmi Pictures	Kunnakudi Vaidyanathan	Seerkazhi Govindarajan, Sivakumar, Manorama, Kumari Padmini, Rama Prabha
Vairagyam	A. Kasilingam	Annai Films	S. M. Subbaiah Naidu	Gemini Ganesan, S. S. Rajendran, Vennira Aadai Nirmala, Nagesh, V. Gopalakrishnan
Veettuku Veedu	C. V. Rajendran	Babu Movies	M. S. Viswanathan	Jaishankar, Lakshmi, R. Muthuraman, Vennira Aadai Nirmala, Nagesh
Vietnam Veedu	P. Madhavan	Sivaji Productions	K. V. Mahadevan	Sivaji Ganesan, Padmini, Srikanth, Nagesh, Ramaprabha, M. Bhanumathi
Vilaiyattu Pillai	A. P. Nagarajan	Gemini Studios	K. V. Mahadevan	Sivaji Ganesan, Padmini, Kanchana, Sivakumar, Cho
Yaen?	T. R. Ramanna	E. V. R. Pictures	T. R. Pappa	A. V. M. Rajan, Ravichandran, Lakshmi, Vennira Aadai Nirmala, Nagesh, Manorama
