= Thiruvarul =

- DVD cover
- Directed by: R. Thyagaraajan
- Produced by: Sandow M. M. A. Chinnappa Thevar
- Starring: A. V. M. Rajan; Jaya
- Music by: Kunnakudi Vaidyanathan
- Production company: Dhandayuthapani Films
- Release date: 26 December 1975
- Country: India
- Language: Tamil

Thiruvarul (transl. Muruga's blessing) is a 1975 Indian Tamil-language devotional film starring A. V. M. Rajan, Jaya, Nagesh, Major Sundarrajan and Thengai Srinivasan. The film was directed by R. Thyagarajan and produced by Dhandayuthapani Films. Music was by Kunnakudi Vaidyanathan and lyrics were by Kannadasan. Kirupanandha Variyar did a cameo in the film as himself. It was released on 26 December 1975.

== Plot ==
Kumara Devan and Ponnan are best friends. Kumara Devan is an ardent devotee of Muruga to the extent where he believes he was born to be a devotee of Muruga. Ponnan is a practical man and also a devotee. Ponnan's life was saved by Kumara Devan during an accident and they are as close and inseparable as brothers. Life goes on with Ponnan getting Kumara Devan one job after another which he keeps losing thanks to him forgetting everything when he hears or sees Muruga. Finally, he joins the job of breaking stones in temple building activity. He sees corruption there when the contractor/caretaker, shortchanges the workers. He is also ostracized when he objects to keeping the lord waiting for the caretaker to come and start the pooja on time. One thing leads to another and he is expelled from the city.

He goes to kill himself on marudhamalai. A peacock blocks his jump and makes him fall near a tree. The roots of the tree pour out water over his face and he wakes up to see Lord Muruga's statue. He stays there and starts worshiping him day and night singing songs. The songs are overheard by a record company owner. He offers him a job as a singer. Devan becomes a successful and famous singer and starts building the temple for his god. Thengai Sreenivasan is a contractor building the temple who cheats Devan which gets caught by Ponnan who takes over as Devan's manager. During a chance meeting, he meets Valliammai who once saved his respect by loaning him a quarter of a rupee. He offers to marry her learning that she is a die hard fan of him.

Trouble starts in the form of her mother. She first blocks the temple pooja saying that her son-in-law built the temple and they have to wait for him. When Devan learns of this, he loses his temper and later, they meet Major Sundarrajan, now as a pauper. Valliammai's mother, having experienced poverty thanks to her husband being an ardent devotee who gave his all to God, tries to control Devan through her daughter. She interferes in his program booking which he does free if it is a temple by charging exorbitant amount without Devan's knowledge. She steals a couple of gold blocks Devan had bought to make armor for his god. She steals half the diamonds Devan has bought to make vel for Muruga. Ponnan saves her hide by taking the blame but she eventually gets caught.

When she justifies that they were ruined thanks to similar nature of her husband, Devan points out that they are leading a rich and luxurious life thanks to God's grace attained by her husband's selfless service. Things escalate when Kirupananda Variyar comes to ask for donation but is forced to return empty handed by Valliammai and her mother. They come to a point where Devan goes to hit Valliammai and she swears on Muruga that he should never touch her. He leaves her with the property saying she chose the property over him and she can have it instead of him. He also says it was his god who elevated him from someone who did not have a quarter of a rupee to someone who can do temple services for 4 lakhs. He also challenges that his god will elevate him to someone who would do service for 40 lakhs. He leaves the house.

Valliammai realizes her mistake and goes to the temple. She gives off all her jewels and money to the temple and prays to the God for return of her marital bliss. The Vel that devan had donated falls over her when a peacock flies in. Devan saves her by removing her from the path without realizing it is his wife. When he does, he goes on to attempt to kill himself for having broken a promise made in the lord's name. Kirupananda Variyar interferes and makes Devan see that it was God's intention that he should rejoin with his wife and live together as the place he touched her was a temple and the reason he touched her can be attributed to peacock & Vel, both God's attributes. Right then, Gopalakrishnan comes and gives him an amount of 5 lakhs as an advance for an overseas contract worth 40 lakhs for his songs. Valliammai truly realizes the power of Devan's devotion, faith and drops the money at the lord's feet and joins Devan in his devotional work.

== Cast ==
- A. V. M. Rajan as Kumara Devan
- Jaya as Valliammai
- Major Sundararajan as Kandhasamy, former caretaker of temple
- Thengai Srinivasan as Fraudulent Contractor
- Nagesh as Ponnan, Kumara Devan's dearest friend
- Sukumari as Alameluammal, Valliammai's mother
- Kirupananda Variyar as himself
- Sandow M.M.A Chinnappa Devar as Variyar's assistant
- Udayppa Devar as Pambatti Siddhar
- V. Gopalakrishnan as Kumaran Gramaphone company owner

== Soundtrack ==
Soundtrack was composed by Kunnakudi Vaidyanathan and the lyrics were by Kannadasan

Track listing
No.	Title	Singer(s)	Length
1.	"Engum Thirinthu"	T. M. Soundararajan
2.	"Kandhan Kaaladiyai"	T. M. Soundararajan
3.	"Kandukondain"	T. M. Soundararajan
4.	"Maalai Vanna Maalai"	P. Susheela
5.	"Malaigalil Sirantha"	Sirkazhi Govindarajan
6.	"Marudha Malai"	P. Susheela, T. M. Soundararajan
7.	"Maruthamalaikku"	T. M. Soundararajan
8.	"Thangam Perithendru"	P. Susheela
9.	"Ulagangal Yaavum"	T. M. Soundararajan

== Critical reception ==
Kanthan of Kalki praised the performances of the actors, the cinematography and the music. Naagai Dharuman of Navamani praised the acting, music, dialogues, cinematography and direction.
