= Murugan Adimai =

- Poster
- Directed by: R. Thyagarajan
- Story by: Sandow M. M. A. Chinnappa Thevar
- Produced by: R. Thyagarajan; C. Dhandayuthapani
- Starring: R. Muthuraman; K. R. Vijaya
- Cinematography: V. Ramamoorthy
- Edited by: M. G. Balurao
- Music by: K. V. Mahadevan
- Production company: C. F. Trust
- Release date: 25 March 1977
- Country: India
- Language: Tamil

Murugan Adimai (transl. Murugan's slave) is a 1977 Indian Tamil-language devotional film starring R. Muthuraman, A. V. M. Rajan, K. R. Vijaya. The film was directed by R. Thyagarajan and released on 25 March 1977.

== Plot ==
The film presents Valliyammal as the daughter of a rich man, and an ardent devotee and servant to Murugan. She encounters a thief who, like her, is Murugan's servant and steals to help Murugan's poor devotees. She understands that Murugan has sent him to marry her to fulfill her wish of marrying a Murugan servant. Her father disapproves but she goes ahead anyway.

They lead an impoverished life after he reforms and looks for work. He is entrusted by his boss to deliver cash. Instead, he gives the cash to the Murugan temple which needs renovation and to save the life of the person in-charge who has tried to kill himself after failing in his attempt to restore the temple. The boss accuses him of thievery and sends him to jail. Valliyammal prays to Murugan. Murugan, along with his father Shiva comes to the boss's house and repays the amount to set him free. At the same time, her father's driver hands over the family property to her as her father is no more. With the money, the couple completes the temple and runs a business successfully.

One day, a group of foreigners, pretending to be Murugan devotees, come to steal the gold statue the couple prays to. Valliyammal sees this in her dream and also sees that they met with an accident. The foreigners reform after their near death.

The couple narrates the story of couple of devotees to highlight the grace of the god. After a few days, she becomes pregnant. Murugan comes in her again and asks her what child she wants. She says she wants a child who is intelligent and handsome like Murugan. He asks whether there is nothing else she wants in the child for which she says no. Murugan blesses as she requested albeit he will live only for 8 years and disappears.

She refuses to divulge the news to her husband. They have a son who everyone praises as the most handsome as well as most intelligent child they have ever seen. However, as the child grows, her fear does, too. At one time, when his 8th birthday is nearing, she tells her husband about the dream and her son too hears it. The son runs off seeking the feet of Murugan to save himself. They too do the same. At one point, they decide to kill themselves as they do not want to exist as proof that Murugan has failed a devotee.

They faint as does the kid. Murugan appears and stops Yama who comes to claim his life. He imprisons Yama who refuses to acquiesce to Murugan's demand of sparing the child. Shiva, Parvathi, Vishnu and Brahma appear. They try to convince Murugan, but Murugan provides counter argument where they went out of the way for their devotees like Markandeya, Prahalada, Abhirama Bhattar. Finally, he takes Viswaroopa saying he is ready for war if that is what they want. They calm him down and tell him that all this argument was for them to see Murugan's Viswaroopa. Yama spares the boy's life. When Parvathi asks Murugan why not give the child a long lifespan directly, Muruga says she did not ask for her child to be his devotee and his grace should never be taken for granted. However, once the kid became his devotee by upbringing, he automatically came under his protection.

== Cast ==
- R. Muthuraman as the thief
- K. R. Vijaya as Valliyammai
- Jaya as Parvathi
- S. A. Ashokan as Yama
- Major Sundarrajan as Valliyammai's father
- A. V. M. Rajan as Shiva
- Thengai Srinivasan as Driver
- Nagesh as Driver's brother-in-law
- Rohini Raghuvaran as young Murugan
- Master Sridhar as adult Murugan
- Karan (credited as Master Raghu) as son of Valliyammai

== Soundtrack ==
Soundtrack was composed by K. V. Mahadevan, and lyrics were by Kannadasan.

Track listing
No.	Title	Singer(s)	Length
1.	"Sangam Valartha Tamizh"	T. M. Soundararajan
2.	"Anandha Thottil"	P. Susheela
3.	"Thaikaatha Pillai"	P. Susheela
4.	"Sathyam Sivam"	P. Susheela

== Critical reception ==
Kausikan of Kalki wrote despite the pleasant colours and sweet songs, the tempo seen in Devar's films is lacking here.
