= Thayilla Kuzhandhai =

- Poster
- Directed by: R. Thyagarajan
- Story by: Sandow M. M. A. Chinnappa Thevar
- Produced by: Sandow M. M. A. Chinnappa Thevar
- Starring: Vijayakumar; Jayachitra
- Cinematography: V. Ramamoorthy
- Edited by: M. G. Balu Rao
- Music by: Shankar–Ganesh
- Production company: Dhandayuthapani Films
- Release date: 22 October 1976
- Country: India
- Language: Tamil

Thayilla Kuzhandhai (transl. Motherless child) is a 1976 Indian Tamil-language drama film directed by R. Thyagarajan and produced by Sandow M. M. A. Chinnappa Thevar. The film stars Vijayakumar and Jayachitra. It was released on 22 October 1976.

== Cast ==
Male cast

- Vijayakumar
- A. V. M. Rajan
- Jai Ganesh
- Thengai Srinivasan
- S. A. Ashokan
- Nagesh
- Sundarrajan
- Sandow M. M. A. Chinnappa Thevar

Female cast

- Jayachitra
- Sukumari
- A. Sakunthala
- Jayapriya
- Baby Bhabita

== Production ==
Thayilla Kuzhandhai was shot mostly in Pollachi. A jallikattu scene pictured on Vijayakumar was shot with more than 20,000 people as extras watching. Due to his experience in the sport, Vijayakumar was able to perform his own stunts. The film also featured a rekla race scene.

== Soundtrack ==
The music was composed by Shankar–Ganesh, with lyrics by Kannadasan.

Track listing
No.	Title	Singer(s)	Length
1.	"Ithu Oru Thiruppam"	P. Susheela, T. M. Soundararajan
2.	"Vellikkizhamai"	P. Susheela, T. M. Soundararajan
3.	"Nee Oru"	P. Susheela, T. M. Soundararajan
4.	"Dance Music" (instrumental)	–

== Release and reception ==
Thayilla Kuzhandhai was released on 22 October 1976, during Diwali. Kanthan of Kalki lauded the performances of Jayachitra, Rajan and Bhabita, Ramamoorthy's cinematography and the rekla race scene.
