= Radha (1973 film) =

1973 Indian film by A. C. Tirulokchandar

- Theatrical release poster
- Directed by: A. C. Thirulokachandar
- Written by: Karaikudi Narayanan (dialogues)
- Screenplay by: A. C. Thirulokachandar
- Starring: R. Muthuraman; Prameela; Rani Chandra
- Cinematography: Viswanath Rai
- Edited by: Kandhasamy
- Music by: Shankar–Ganesh
- Production company: Nahadha Productions
- Release date: 23 November 1973
- Country: India
- Language: Tamil

Radha (/rɑːðɑː/) is a 1973 Indian Tamil-language film written and directed by A. C. Tirulokchandar. The film stars R. Muthuraman, Prameela and Rani Chandra with Nagesh, Cho Ramaswamy and Major Sundarrajan in supporting roles. It was released on 23 November 1973.

== Cast ==
- R. Muthuraman
- Prameela
- Rani Chandra
- Nagesh
- Cho Ramaswamy
- Major Sundarrajan

== Soundtrack ==
The music was composed by Shankar–Ganesh, with lyrics by Vaali.

Track listing
No.	Title	Singer(s)	Length
1.	"Unnai Ethirpaarthen"	P. Susheela
2.	"Kadavul Meethu Aaanai"	S. P. Balasubrahmanyam, P. Susheela
3.	"Ondralla Irandalla"	P. Susheela
4.	"Hari Hari Giridhari"	Sirkazhi Govindarajan, P. Susheela
5.	"Naanum Paithiyam"	Thiruchi Loganathan, A. L. Raghavan, S. V. Ponnusamy

== Reception ==
Navamani praised the acting, dialogues and direction.
