= Mannippu =

- Poster
- Directed by: M. Krishnan Nair
- Screenplay by: Thuraiyur K. Moorthi
- Produced by: P. L. Mohan Ram
- Starring: Jaishankar; Vennira Aadai Nirmala; A. V. M. Rajan; Lakshmi
- Cinematography: S. S. Lal; M. G. R. Mani
- Edited by: S. A. Murugesan
- Music by: S. M. Subbaiah Naidu
- Production company: Mohan Productions
- Release date: 28 November 1969
- Running time: 135 minutes
- Country: India
- Language: Tamil

Mannippu (transl. Forgiveness) is a 1969 Indian Tamil-language romantic thriller film, directed by M. Krishnan Nair and written by Thuraiyur K. Moorthi. The film stars Jaishankar, A. V. M. Rajan, Vennira Aadai Nirmala and Lakshmi, with Nagesh, R. S. Manohar, C. K. Saraswathi and Major Sundarrajan in supporting roles. It is a remake of the Malayalam film Padunna Puzha (1968), also by the same director. The film was released on 28 November 1969, and was successful at the box office.

== Plot ==
Advocate Kumar and his sister Bhama lose their mother and are brought up by their maternal aunt, who loves them as her own. Radha gives Bhama daily music lessons. Radha is in love with Gopi, an artist. But her mother is against their relationship due to a family feud. Kumar invites Gopi to his house. Bhama is impressed by the artistic talents of Gopi and falls in love with him at first sight. Gopi rejects her love and Bhama attempts to commit suicide. Her step mother consoles her and assures her fulfillment of her ambitions. One day, Bhama is not at home when Radha arrives for their lessons. Bhama's step mother gives her a cup of coffee and leaves for a wedding. Kumar, who is attracted to Radha, attempts to take advantage of the situation. Radha resists out of fear and shame. Kumar blocks her mouth with his hands. Radha dies and Kumar throws her corpse in a river. Gopi is arrested by the police on the evidence of a letter found in her handbag, in which he suggests they elope. Kumar decides to surrender to the police to save Gopi, whom he knows to be innocent. Kumar's step mother learns of Kumar's decision. At the climax, the step mother appears before the court during Gopi's trial and reveals that the real cause for Radha's death was the poison that she mixed in Radha's coffee. Her objective was get Bhama and Gopi married following Radha's demise. Kumar fatally poisons himself. The mother is sentenced to ten years imprisonment. Gopi is freed by the court and the film ends with Gopi lamenting his lover's demise on the banks of the river.

== Cast ==
- Jaishankar as Artist Gopi
- A. V. M. Rajan as Advocate Kumar
- Vennira Aadai Nirmala as Radha, Bhama's music teacher
- Lakshmi as Bhama, Kumar's sister
- Nagesh as Nalla Muthu, barber
- R. S. Manohar as Public Prosecutor
- Major Sundarrajan as Govinda Pillai, Gopi's father
- S. V. Ramadas as Police Inspector
- C. K. Saraswathi as Radha's mother
- Sattampillai Venkataraman as Chettiyar
- Loose Mohan as Ramaiah, Kumar's servant
- Ennathe Kannaiah as Radha's uncle
- P. K. Saraswathi as Bhama & Kumar’s mother

== Soundtrack ==
Music was by S. M. Subbaiah Naidu and lyrics were written by Vaali.

Track listing
No.	Title	Singer(s)	Length
1.	"Kuyilosai Vellum"	P. Susheela A. P. Komala	03:04
2.	"Nee Engey En Ninaivugal" (male)	T. M. Soundararajan	04:18
3.	"Vennila Vaanil Varum"	T. M. Soundararajan P. Susheela	04:53
4.	"Nee Engey En Ninaivugal" (female)	A. P. Komala, P. Susheela	04:14
5.	"Kadavul Thoongavillai"	Sirkazhi Govindarajan	03:54
6.	"Nee Engey En Ninaivugal" (pathos)	P. Susheela	04:51
Total length:			25:14
