= Oorum Uravum =

1982 Indian Tamil film by Major Sundarrajan

- Theatrical release poster
- Directed by: Major Sundarrajan
- Written by: Krishna (dialogues)
- Story by: M. Balaiah
- Produced by: Pushpa Rajan
- Starring: Sivaji Ganesan; K. R. Vijaya; A. V. M. Rajan; Thengai Srinivasan
- Cinematography: T. S. Vinayagam
- Edited by: B. Kandhasamy
- Music by: Shankar–Ganesh
- Production company: Raja Mahalakshmi Arts
- Release date: 14 November 1982
- Country: India
- Language: Tamil

Oorum Uravum (transl. The place and people) is a 1982 Indian Tamil-language film, directed by Major Sundarrajan and produced by Pushpa Rajan. The film stars Sivaji Ganesan, K. R. Vijaya, A. V. M. Rajan and Thengai Srinivasan. It is a remake of the Telugu film Oorukichina Maata. The film was released on 14 November 1982.

== Plot ==
Manikkam works hard as does his village to make his younger brother Pounraj a doctor to serve the people of the village. Once he becomes a doctor, he falls in love with a rich colleague, marries her and settles down in the city with his wealthy father-in-law. How Manikkam brings Pounraj to his senses is the rest of the story.

== Cast ==
- Sivaji Ganesan as Manikkam
- K. R. Vijaya as Lakshmi
- A. V. M. Rajan
- Thengai Srinivasan
- Nizhalgal Ravi as Pounraj
- Kalaranjini
- Major Sundarrajan

== Soundtrack ==
Soundtrack was composed by Shankar–Ganesh. The lyrics were written by Vaali, Pulamaipithan and Vairamuthu.

Track listing
No.	Title	Singer(s)	Length
1.	"Pullankuzhal"	S. P. Balasubrahmanyam, Vani Jairam
2.	"Orey Vazhthuraikka"	T. M. Soundararajan, P. Susheela
3.	"Kanni Penn"	Malaysia Vasudevan, S. P. Sailaja
4.	"Ada Yethaiyo Ninacha"	T. M. Soundararajan

== Critical reception ==
Thiragnani of Kalki praised the acting of star cast and concluded saying the film has a vibrancy that is not in the title. Balumani of Anna praised the performances of cast and cinematography in song sequnces and found Krishna's dialogues as okay. He also felt the film resembled the previous films of Ganesan and would have worked had it been released few years ago and Sundarrajan's direction stamp is not visible in the film.
