= Aayiram Kalathu Payir =

- Directed by: T. S. Durairaj
- Screenplay by: Pulavar Nagashanmugam
- Story by: Master Pictures Story Department
- Produced by: T. S. Durairaj
- Starring: Kaka Radhakrishnan; Vairam Krishnamurthi; Radhabhai
- Music by: S. M. Subbaiah Naidu
- Production company: Master Pictures
- Release date: 1963
- Country: India
- Language: Tamil

Aayiram Kalathu Payir (transl. Crop of (a) thousand years) is a 1963 Indian Tamil-language drama film directed by T. S. Durairaj. The film stars Kaka Radhakrishnan and Radhabhai.

== Cast ==
The following list is adapted from the book Thiraikalanjiyam part 2.

- Kaka Radhakrishnan
- A. V. M. Rajan
- Vairam Krishnamurthi
- K. Kannan
- Nanjil Natarajan
- T. M. Kannappan
- M. Subbaraman
- Radhabhai
- K. G. Shanthi
- P. Leela
- Nirmaladevi

== Production ==
The film was produced and directed by T. S. Durairaj under the banner Master Pictures. Pulavar Nagashanmugam wrote the screenplay and dialogues to the story written by the story department of Master Pictures.

== Soundtrack ==
Music was composed by S. M. Subbaiah Naidu.

Song	Singer/s	Lyricist	Length
"Pachaimalai Chaaralile"	T. M. Soundararajan & S. Janaki	Kannadasan	04:42
"Maamaa Pille Maapille Maalaiyittan"	T. M. Soundararajan & S. Janaki	Kannadasan	02:45
"Katti Vaicha Poovum Vaadavillaiye"	S. Janaki	Kannadasan	
"Thottathu Poovai Innum"	P. Susheela	Kannadasan	03:57
"Yaarukku Naan Theengu Seythen"	T. M. Soundararajan	Kannadasan	03:21
"Aandavane Ezhaiyin Vaazhvil"	Thangappan	Kannadasan	02:57
"Vattamitta Pottazhagan Kattazhagan Kandasaami"	P. Leela	Chidambaram Sundaram Pillai	

== Reception ==
T. M. Ramachandran of Sport and Pastime wrote that Dorairaj deserved to be congratulated for making a film with newcomers and giving them an opportunity to show their talent.
