= Namma Veettu Lakshmi =

1966 film by B. R. Panthulu

- Directed by: B. R. Panthulu
- Story by: Ma Ra
- Produced by: B. R. Panthulu
- Starring: B. R. Panthulu; M. V. Rajamma
- Cinematography: V. Ramamurthy
- Edited by: R. Devarajan
- Music by: M. S. Viswanathan
- Production company: Padmini Pictures
- Release date: 5 August 1966
- Country: India
- Language: Tamil

Namma Veettu Lakshmi (transl. Lakshmi of our home) is a 1966 Indian Tamil-language drama film produced and directed by B. R. Panthulu. It is a remake of his own Kannada film Dudde Doddappa, released earlier the same year. Panthulu also stars as the male lead, alongside M. V. Rajamma, A. V. M. Rajan, R. Muthuraman and Nagesh. The film was released on 5 August 1966, and became a commercial success.

== Plot ==
An ordinary man becomes wealthy in a rags to riches manner through hard work. He lives with his wife Saradamma, two sons and a daughter, who are the opposite of him and lack the same work ethics. Saradamma is obsessed with a pompous lifestyle. The first son, a graduate, considers himself smarter than his father and disobeys him, while spending lavishly and living leisurely. The second son Raju does not care about anything except acting.

One day, the patriarch tells his family that he has lost all his wealth, much to their horror. They are forced to shift to a village, where the patriarch and Saradamma run a small business to eke out a living. Their children finally realise the value of their father's teachings. The patriarch eventually reveals that their wealth is safe and that he played this game just to teach them the values of life.

== Cast ==
Male cast

- B. R. Panthulu as the patriarch
- A. V. M. Rajan as the graduate
- Nagesh as Raju
- R. Muthuraman

Female cast

- M. V. Rajamma as Saradamma
- Bharati as Saradamma's daughter
- Vanisri

== Production ==
After the success of the Kannada film Dudde Doddappa (1966), its producer-director and male lead B. R. Panthulu of Padmini Pictures decided to remake it in Tamil under the title Namma Veettu Lakshmi. Panthulu returned to his positions in the remake, as did M. V. Rajamma, the female lead of the original and Bharati, who played the daughter of the couple. Cinematography was handled by V. Ramamurthy, and editing by R. Devarajan. Ma Ra, the writer of the Kannada original, also wrote for the remake. The final length of the film was 3,855 metres (12,648 ft).

== Soundtrack ==
The soundtrack was composed by M. S. Viswanathan, and the lyrics were written by Kannadasan.

Track listing
No.	Title	Singer(s)	Length
1.	"Nalla Manaivi"	Sirkazhi Govindarajan	2:36
2.	"Alankaram Kalaiyamal"	L. R. Eswari, K. J. Yesudas	3:31
3.	"Vazhi Vazhiye Vanda"	P. Susheela
4.	"Vandhuvidu Vattamidu"	P. Susheela
5.	"Yaaridam Yaaridam Paadam"	P. Susheela, T. M. Soundararajan
6.	"Panam Irunthaal"	Sirkazhi Govindarajan
7.	"Panneerum Rojaavum"	S. Janaki
8.	"Soda Soda"	Sirkazhi Govindarajan	3:19

== Reception ==
Kalki felt the film gave a feel of watching an play and also noted the proceedings are as outdated as the plot while panning the acting of Rajan and Vanishree and called Nagesh's comedy as generic.
