= Yaen? =

1970 film by T. R. Ramanna

- Poster
- Directed by: T. R. Ramanna
- Screenplay by: Subbu Arumugam
- Based on: Mudhukinnam by Krishna
- Produced by: E. V. Rajan
- Starring: A. V. M. Rajan; Ravichandran; Lakshmi; Vennira Aadai Nirmala
- Cinematography: G. Durai
- Music by: T. R. Pappa
- Production company: EVR Films
- Release date: 14 January 1970
- Country: India
- Language: Tamil

Yaen? (/jeɪn/ transl. Why?) is a 1970 Indian Tamil-language film directed by T. R. Ramanna and written by Subbu Arumugam. It is based on Muthukinnam, a novel written by Krishna and serialised in Kumudam. The film stars A. V. M. Rajan, Ravichandran, Lakshmi and Vennira Aadai Nirmala. It was released on 14 January 1970 and emerged a success.

== Plot ==
Kamala, a young woman who lives with her family, meets a singer, who is also an aspiring lawyer. Although they love each other, Kamala is sceptical of the relationship working out because of their different social status. A villain lusts for Kamala and stalks her.

Kamala's father suddenly dies, and she receives a marriage proposal shortly thereafter. She is to marry a rich but significantly older man, who treats her poorly. Kamala's younger brother loses a leg in an accident and goes missing, and the old man prohibits Kamala from looking for him. Enraged, her elder brother shoots the old man and is arrested. He later successfully escapes from prison.

The villain hides a bomb in Kamala's house in an attempt to kill the family. Kamala's dog finds the bomb and brings it to her missing brother, who had been in a nearby forest. The elder brother takes the bomb from the younger brother and dies when it detonates. Kamala and the singer begin a relationship.

== Cast ==
Male cast

- A. V. M. Rajan as Kamala's elder brother
- Ravichandran as the singer
- Nagesh
- M. R. R. Vasu as a villain
- V. S. Raghavan as Kamala's husband
- Ennathe Kannaiah

Female cast

- Lakshmi as Kamala
- Vennira Aadai Nirmala

Supporting cast

- Veeraraghavan as Kamala's father
- Master Audhinarayanan as Kamala's younger brother

== Production ==
Yaen? was directed by T. R. Ramanna, and produced by E. V. Rajan for EVR Films. It was written by Subbu Arumugam. Cinematography was handled by G. Durai. Shooting took place at the studios Vasu and AVM. The film is based on Mudhukinnam, a novel written by Krishna and serialised in Kumudam.

== Themes ==
The film questions why destiny plays games with people's lives. Its title Yaen?, meaning "why", refers to this question.

== Soundtrack ==
The soundtrack was composed by T. R. Pappa.

Track listing
| No. | Title | Singer(s) | Length |
|---|---|---|---|
| 1. | "Iraivan Endroru Kavingnan" | S. P. Balasubrahmanyam |
| 2. | "Kadavulukku Manithanidam" | Sarala |
| 3. | "Kadiparillatha Kani Yethu" | L. R. Eswari |
| 4. | "Kannan Enakkoru Pillai" | Soolamangalam Rajalakshmi |
| 5. | "Mella Pesu Mella Pesu" | T. M. Soundararajan, L. R. Eswari |
| 6. | "Varuvaya Vel Muruga" | Sarala S. P. Balasubrahmanyam |

== Release ==
Yaen? was released on 14 January 1970. The film commercially successful, running for over ten weeks in theatres.
