= Bathilukku Bathil =

- Theatrical release poster
- Directed by: Jambu
- Written by: Madurai Thirumaran
- Produced by: K. R. Balan
- Starring: A. V. M. Rajan; R. Muthuraman; C. R. Vijayakumari; Vennira Aadai Nirmala
- Music by: S. M. Subbaiah Naidu
- Production company: Balan Combines
- Release date: 1 September 1972
- Running time: 123 minutes
- Country: India
- Language: Tamil

Bathilukku Bathil (transl. Tit for tat) is a 1972 Indian Tamil-language Western film directed by Jambu. The film stars A. V. M. Rajan, R. Muthuraman, C. R. Vijayakumari and Vennira Aadai Nirmala. It was released on 1 September 1972.

== Plot ==
A man seeks revenge on his friend, who betrayed him and stole his money, and harassed his wife.

== Cast ==
- A. V. M. Rajan
- R. Muthuraman
- C. R. Vijayakumari
- Vennira Aadai Nirmala
- V. K. Ramasamy
- Master Prabhakar
- Jayakumari
- Suruli Rajan
- Thengai Srinivasan
- M. R. R. Vasu
- Kutty Padmini
- S. V. Ramadas
- A. Karunanidhi
- V. S. Raghavan
- Ragini

== Soundtrack ==
The music was composed by S. M. Subbaiah Naidu.

Song	Singers	Length
"Aval Jathipoo "	T. M. Soundararajan	03:45
" Ellu Ettu Pengal "	T. M. Soundararajan, P. Susheela, L. R. Eswari	05:27
" Vaanga Sir Vaanga "		03:48
