= Manam Oru Kurangu =

1967 film by A. T. Krishnaswamy

- Theatrical release poster
- Directed by: A. T. Krishnaswamy
- Screenplay by: Cho Ramaswamy
- Based on: Pygmalion by George Bernard Shaw
- Produced by: T. V. Arasu
- Starring: Cho Ramaswamy; R. Muthuraman; T. S. Balaiah; A. V. M. Rajan; K. R. Vijaya; Vijayarani
- Music by: D. B. Ramachandran
- Production company: Sashti Films
- Release date: 14 January 1967
- Country: India
- Language: Tamil

Manam Oru Kurangu (transl. Mind is a monkey) is a 1967 Indian Tamil-language satirical film directed by A. T. Krishnaswamy and produced by T. V. Arasu. Based on the play of the same name, itself inspired by the 1913 George Bernard Shaw play Pygmalion, the film stars Cho Ramaswamy (who also wrote the screenplay), R. Muthuraman, T. S. Balaiah, A. V. M. Rajan, K. R. Vijaya and Vijayarani. It was released on 14 January 1967 and became a commercial success.

== Plot ==
Maruthayi is a village-based vegetable seller who, by sheer accident, becomes an actress named Mallika Devi. Murgesa, a farmer from the same village, loves Maruthayi and wants to marry her, but after she becomes an actress, she moves away from him. It was Gopinath, a wealthy socialite, who made her an actress as he laid a challenge that he would transform a vegetable seller into an actor if his regular heroine walked out at the last minute. A rich man's son Chellappa aspires to marry Maruthayi, but ends up marrying another girl. Murgesa realises that Maruthayi has a new status; when he tries to meet her, Gopinath discourages him, and he returns to his village. When Gopinath confesses his love for Maruthayi, she does not reciprocate. She is left alone, with nowhere to go.

== Cast ==
- Cho Ramaswamy as Chellappa
- R. Muthuraman as Murugesa
- T. S. Balaiah as Chellappa's father
- A. V. M. Rajan as Gopinath
- K. R. Vijaya as Maruthayi / Mallika Devi
- Vijayarani as Chellappa's wife

== Production ==
Manam Oru Kurangu was a play written by Cho Ramaswamy and inspired by the George Bernard Shaw play Pygmalion. It was originally announced as Dil Ek Bandhar, a pun on the title Dil Ek Mandir. The play Manam Oru Kurangu, which also starred Delhi Ganesh, was later adapted into a feature film with the same name directed by A. T. Krishnaswamy and produced by T. V. Arasu under Sashti Films. Cho was part of the cast and also wrote the screenplay. M. P. Viswanathan worked as an assistant make-up artist.

== Themes ==
The film exposes the snobbish values dominating society in everyday life.

== Soundtrack ==
The soundtrack was composed by D. B. Ramachandran. The title song, performed by T. M. Soundararajan, became the film's most popular song.

Track listing
No.	Title	Lyrics	Singer(s)	Length
1.	"Aruppu Kotta Machchan"	Vidwan Ve. Lakshmanan	L. R. Eswari	3:24
2.	"Beautiful Marvellous"	Vidwan Ve. Lakshmanan	Sirkazhi Govindarajan, L. R. Eswari	3:05
3.	"Manam Oru Kurangu"	V. Seetharaman	T. M. Soundararajan	3:17
4.	"Pattanathu Santhaiyile"	Vidwan Ve. Lakshmanan	Soolamangalam Rajalakshmi	3:02
5.	"Pogiren Pudhiya"	Vidwan Ve. Lakshmanan	T. M. Soundararajan, P. Susheela	3:52
Total length:				16:40

== Release and reception ==
Manam Oru Kurangu was released on 14 January 1967, during the festive occasion of Pongal. Kalki called it a film worth watching for relieving stress. Despite facing competition from other Pongal releases such as Kandhan Karunai, Pattathu Rani and Penne Nee Vaazhga, the film emerged a commercial success.

== Bibliography ==
- Pandian, Anand (2009). Crooked Stalks: Cultivating Virtue in South India. Duke University Press. ISBN 978-0-8223-9101-2.
- Ramanujam, K. S. (1971). Challenge and Response: An Intimate Report of Tamil Nadu Politics, 1967–1971. Sundara Prachuralayam. OCLC 482334.
- Velayutham, Selvaraj, ed. (2008). Tamil Cinema: The Cultural Politics of India's Other Film Industry. Routledge. ISBN 978-1-134-15446-3.
