= Thirumagal =

- Film poster
- Directed by: A. S. A. Sami
- Screenplay by: C. K. Govindarajalu
- Story by: Aaroor Dass
- Produced by: C. K. Govindarajalu
- Starring: Gemini Ganesan; Padmini
- Cinematography: M. Karnan; K. S. Mani
- Edited by: R. Devarajan
- Music by: K. V. Mahadevan
- Production company: Govindaraja Films
- Distributed by: Oriental Pictures
- Release date: 14 April 1971
- Running time: 137 minutes
- Country: India
- Language: Tamil

Thirumagal (transl. Own Daughter) is a 1971 Indian Tamil-language drama film, directed by A. S. A. Sami. The screenplay was written by C. K. Govindarajalu from a story by Aaroor Dass, and the music was composed by K. V. Mahadevan. It stars Lakshmi and Sivakumar in a major role, with Gemini Ganesan, A. V. M. Rajan, Padmini and Major Sundarrajan playing pivotal roles. The film was released on 14 April 1971, and failed at the box office.

== Cast ==
- Gemini Ganesan as Advocate Kandasamy
- Padmini as Kalyani, Kandasamy's wife
- A. V. M. Rajan as Raju, Ranga Rajan's son
- Lakshmi as Radha, Kandhasamy's sister
- Sivakumar as Ramu, Raju's half-brother
- Major Sundarrajan as Rangarajan
- S. Varalakshmi as Maragatham, Ramu's mother
- Nagesh as Subbusamy
- M. Bhanumathi as Bhanu, Subbusamy's fiancé
- Baby Rani as Neela, Kandasamy & Kalyani's daughter
- Udayappa as Bhanu's father
- Jayakumari as club dancer

== Soundtrack ==
Music was by K. V. Mahadevan.

All lyrics are written by Kannadasan.

No.	Title	Singer(s)	Length
1.	"Ullangal Palavidham"	T. M. Soundararajan, P. Susheela, S. P. Balasubrahmanyam	04:09
2.	"Kaalale Nilam Alandhu"	P. Susheela	03:59
3.	"Club Dance" (Instrumental)	—	02:38
4.	"Punnagaiyil Poo Pookum"	P. Susheela	03:26
Total length:			14:12
