= Noorandu Kalam Vazhga =

- Directed by: K. Sampath
- Starring: A. V. M. Rajan; Kanchana; Vennira Aadai Nirmala
- Music by: K. V. Mahadevan
- Production company: S. V. S. Pictures
- Release date: 20 November 1970
- Running time: 155 minutes
- Country: India
- Language: Tamil

Noorandu Kalam Vazhga (transl. Live for a 100 years) is a 1970 Indian Tamil-language romantic thriller film directed by K. Sampath, starring A. V. M. Rajan, Kanchana and Vennira Aadai Nirmala, with M. N. Nambiar playing the antagonist. It was released on 20 November 1970.

== Cast ==
- A. V. M. Rajan
- Kanchana
- Vennira Aadai Nirmala
- M. N. Nambiar
- Nagesh
- V. K. Ramasamy
- Sachu
- Kaka Radhakrishnan
- Sarala
- Girija

== Soundtrack ==
The soundtrack was composed by K. V. Mahadevan, with lyrics by Kannadasan.

Track listing
No.	Title	Singer(s)	Length
1.	"Kudumbathin Thalaivi"	P. Susheela	2:13
2.	"Unnai Vidava Avan Azhaganavan"	L. R. Eswari	4:52
3.	"Kalaignan Ullam Kalai Ullam"	T. M. Soundararajan, P. Susheela	4:22
4.	"Nalina kalaiyadi Nadikkum"	L. R. Eswari, P. Susheela	3:13
5.	"Maangalyam Thirumaangalyam"	T. M. Soundararajan, P. Susheela	3:53
Total length:			18:33

== Reception ==
The Indian Express wrote that the film had "the rather overdone theme of orphan children and brother-sister affection", but praised the songs, and the performances of Nagesh, Ramasamy and Kanchana.
