= Jeevanamsam =

- Theatrical release poster
- Directed by: Malliyam Rajagopal
- Written by: Malliyam Rajagopal
- Based on: Jeevanamsam by Malliyam Rajagopal
- Produced by: Das and Das
- Starring: Jaishankar; Vijayakumari
- Cinematography: M. Karnan
- Edited by: R. Devarajan
- Music by: K. V. Mahadevan
- Production company: Malliyam Productions
- Distributed by: Doss & Doss
- Release date: 21 October 1968
- Running time: 4724 ft
- Country: India
- Language: Tamil

Jeevanamsam (/dʒiːvənɑːmsəm/ transl. Alimony) is a 1968 Indian Tamil language drama film, directed and written by Malliyam Rajagopal. The film, his directorial debut, is based on his play of the same name. It stars Jaishankar and C. R. Vijayakumari in lead roles alongside A. V. M. Rajan, Pushpalatha, Sivakumar, debutante Lakshmi and Nagesh playing pivotal roles. The film, released on 21 October 1968, was successful at the box office.

== Plot ==
The plot centers around the relationships, misunderstandings, and ultimate reconciliation between couples.

== Cast ==
- Jaishankar as Moorthy
- Vijayakumari as Lalitha
- A. V. M. Rajan as Balu
- Pushpalatha as Viji
- Nagesh as Advocate Ramanujam
- Sowcar Janaki as Janaki
- S. V. Subbaiah as Moorthy's uncle
- S. V. Sahasranamam as Lalitha & Balu's father
- Pandari Bai as Meenakshi, Lalitha & Balu's mother
- Sivakumar as Sabapathy
- Lakshmi as Lalitha, Moorthy's sister
- Veerappan as Janu's husband
- Sachu as Janu
- A. K. Veerasamy as Lalitha's & Balu's grandpa
- Sundari Bai as Lalitha & Balu's grandmother
- K. Vijayan
- A. Samikannu as Sabapathi's father

== Soundtrack ==
The soundtrack was by K. V. Mahadevan, with lyrics by Vaali and Malliyam Rajagopal.

| Song | Singer | Length |
|---|---|---|
| "Akkakko Kai Kai Malar Kai" | T. M. Soundararajan, P. Susheela | 03:51 |
| "Enakkulle Nee Irukka Unakkulle" — Happy | T. M. Soundararajan, P. Susheela | 03:20 |
| "Enakkulle Nee Irukka Unakkulle" — Sad | P. Susheela | 03:20 |
