= Kannan Varuvan (1970 film) =

- Theatrical release poster
- Directed by: I. N. Murthy
- Screenplay by: A. L. Narayanan
- Story by: A. Gurusami
- Produced by: V. S. Ranganathan
- Starring: Jaishankar; Muthuraman; Lakshmi; Nirmala; Vijaya Lalitha
- Cinematography: R. Chittibabu
- Edited by: P. Bhaktavatsalam
- Music by: Shankar–Ganesh
- Production company: Devalayam
- Release date: 2 October 1970
- Country: India
- Language: Tamil

Kannan Varuvan (transl. Kannan will come) is a 1970 Indian Tamil-language film directed by I. N. Murthy and written by A. L. Narayanan from a story by A. Gurusami. The film stars Jaishankar, Muthuraman, Lakshmi, Nirmala and Vijaya Lalitha. It was released on 2 October 1970.

== Plot ==
A man wants to keep his promise to an old man who saved him from being lynched. This promise involves the protégé getting into many domestic problems, sacrificing his love, fighting goondas and putting the house in order.

== Cast ==
- Jaishankar
- Muthuraman
- Lakshmi
- Nirmala
- Vijaya Lalitha
- Major Sundarrajan
- Manohar
- Chandrababu
- Thengai Srinivasan
- Suruli Rajan
- I. S. R.

== Soundtrack ==
The music was composed by Shankar–Ganesh, with lyrics by Kannadasan.

Track listing
No.	Title	Singer(s)	Length
1.	"Boomiyai Padaithathu"	T. M. Soundararajan
2.	"Kannan Varuvan Indru"	P. Susheela, Jikki
3.	"Nilavukku Povom Idam"	T. M. Soundararajan, L. R. Eswari
4.	"Poovinum Melliya" (female)	P. Susheela
5.	"Poovinum Melliya" (male)	T. M. Soundararajan

== Release and reception ==
Kannan Varuvan was released on 2 October 1970. The Indian Express wrote, "Despite the familiarity of the ingredients, there is a certain warmth in the film that recommends itself", praising its family-friendly theme and lack of vulgarity.
