= Annaiyum Pithavum =

1969 film by Krishnan–Panju

- Theatrical release poster
- Directed by: Krishnan–Panju
- Written by: V. C. Guhanathan
- Produced by: M. Murugan; M. Kumaran; M. Saravanan
- Starring: A. V. M. Rajan; Vanisri; Sivakumar; Lakshmi
- Cinematography: Thambu
- Edited by: S. Panjabi
- Music by: M. S. Viswanathan
- Production company: AVM Productions
- Release date: 19 September 1969
- Country: India
- Language: Tamil

Annaiyum Pithavum (transl. Mother and Father) is a 1969 Indian Tamil-language drama film directed by Krishnan–Panju and written by V. C. Guhanathan for AVM Productions. The film stars A. V. M. Rajan, Vanisri, Sivakumar and Lakshmi. It was released on 19 September 1969, and became a commercial success.

== Plot ==
Ponnaiah, a factory worker, loses his eyesight in a workplace accident, and his family faces a financial crisis. Hence, his son Bhaskar decides to go to work to support the family.

== Cast ==
- A. V. M. Rajan
- Vanisri
- Sivakumar
- Lakshmi
- V. K. Ramasamy
- Cho
- Manorama
- V. Nagayya as Ponnaiah
- G. Sakunthala
- T. R. Ramachandran
- S. N. Lakshmi
- V. Gopalakrishnan
- M. Bhanumathi

== Production ==
Annaiyum Pithavum was directed by Krishnan–Panju, and produced by M. Murugan, M. Kumaran and M. Saravanan under AVM Productions. V. C. Guhanathan wrote the screenplay.

== Soundtrack ==
The music was composed by M. S. Viswanathan, and the lyrics were written by Kannadasan.

Song	Singers	Length
"Sathiyama Solvathellam"	T. M. Soundararajan	03:40
"Malarum Mangaiyum"	P. Susheela	03:59
"Modhiram Pottadhu Pol"	S. Janaki	04:22
"Iraiva Unakkoru Kelvi"	P. Susheela	02:59
"Ponnale Vazhum Pudhiya Ulagam"	L. R. Eswari	04:47
"Muthana Oorgaolamo"	L. R. Eswari	04:00

== Release and reception ==
Annaiyum Pithavum was released on 19 September 1969. The critic from The Indian Express called the film "a very familiar story told in very familiar terms" and described the screenplay as "very naive", but praised the performances of Nagayya, Gopalakrishnan and Vanisri, while opining that the rest of the cast was "unimpressive". The film became a commercial success.
