= Dharisanam =

- Directed by: V. T. Arasu
- Written by: Singaravelan
- Produced by: V. T. Arasu
- Starring: A. V. M. Rajan; Pushpalatha
- Cinematography: Bombay Maniyam
- Edited by: K. Govindaswamy
- Music by: Soolamangalam Rajalakshmi
- Production company: Sendhoor Films
- Release date: 6 February 1970
- Country: India
- Language: Tamil

Dharisanam (transl. Darshan) is a 1970 Indian Tamil-language film produced and directed by V. T. Arasu. The film stars A. V. M. Rajan and Pushpalatha, the former in a dual role. It was released on 6 February 1970.

== Plot ==
Chandramohan, who has suffered financially, meets a lookalike named Pandiyan, and they agree to swap identities.

== Cast ==
- A. V. M. Rajan as Chandramohan and Pandiyan
- Pushpalatha
- Srikanth
- Cho
- Manorama
- G. Sakunthala
- Shylashri
- Kumari Padmini
- Jayabharathi
- Vijayachandrika
- P. K. Saraswathi

== Production ==
Dharisanam was produced and directed by V. T. Arasu under Sendhoor Films, written by Singaravelan, photographed by Bombay Maniyam and edited by K. Govindaswamy. It remains the only film where A. V. M. Rajan played a dual role. A song sequence was shot at Madurai.

== Soundtrack ==
The soundtrack was composed by Soolamangalam Rajalakshmi in her film debut, and the lyrics were written by Kannadasan.

Track listing
No.	Title	Singer(s)	Length
1.	"Kalyanamam Kalyanam"	T. M. Soundararajan, P. Susheela	3:24
2.	"Avanavan Thalaiyezhuthu"	T. M. Soundararajan	4:13
3.	"Pogathe Iyya Pogathe"	Manorama, S. Rangarajan	4:43
4.	"Ithu Maalai Nerathu Mayakkam"	T. M. Soundararajan, L. R. Eswari	4:03
Total length:			16:23

== Release and reception ==
Dharisanam was released on 6 February 1970. The Indian Express wrote, "The familiar plot with two similar-looking persons and its [repercussions]—in this movie, good—are over-stressed. The screenplay is very school-boyish and so are the other aspects of the film", but praised Rajan's performance.
