= Navagraham =

1970 film by K. Balachander

- Poster
- Directed by: K. Balachander
- Written by: K. Balachandar
- Produced by: Rama Arangannal
- Starring: Nagesh; R. Muthuraman; Srikanth; Lakshmi
- Cinematography: N. Balakrishnan
- Music by: V. Kumar
- Release date: 3 September 1970
- Running time: 152 minutes
- Country: India
- Language: Tamil

Navagraham (transl. Nine Planets) is a 1970 Indian Tamil-language comedy drama film written and directed by K. Balachander. The film stars Nagesh, Srikanth, R. Muthuraman and Lakshmi, with Ragini, Sivakumar, Rama Prabha, Y. G. Mahendran (his film debut), V. Gopalakrishnan and G. Sakunthala in supporting roles. It was released on 3 September 1970.

== Plot ==
Nine people living as a joint family in a house have amongst them varied characters with weird idiosyncrasies. A thief and orphan, Baalu, enters the house and uses this to his advantage , but sets the things right in house . In the end , it's known he is son of the house, but he already leaves to Andaman for new job

== Cast ==
- Nagesh as Baalu
- Sundarrajan as Somu
- Muthuraman as Siva
- V. Gopalakrishnan as Mali
- I. S. R as Mani
- Mahendran as Anumanthu
- Sivakumar as Vatsala's lover
- Srikanth as Eeswaran
- Ragini as Akilaandam
- Rama Prabha as Amirtham
- G. Sakunthala as Saraswathi
- Lakshmi as Vatsala

== Production ==
Navagraham marked Y. G. Mahendran's acting debut in cinema. Manorama was supposed to play the love interest of Nagesh but was dropped at the latter's insistence causing a permanent rift between them.

== Soundtrack ==
The soundtrack was composed by V. Kumar and lyrics were written by Vaali.

Song	Singer	Length
"Ellame Vayathukku"	A. L. Raghavan	3:35
"Yaaro Antha Pakkam"	A. L. Raghavan	3:20
"Unnai Thotta"	S. P. Balasubrahmanyam & P. Susheela	3:34
"Neenga Navagraham"	A. L. Raghavan, Ponnusaamy, Major sundararajan, Ragini, Muthuraman, Srikanth, Ramaprabha, G.Sakuntala & Chorus	5:41
"Akilandam Akilandam"	Ponnusaamy	4:30
