= Sontham (1973 film) =

1973 Tamil film by A. C. Tirulokchandar

- Theatrical release poster
- Directed by: A. C. Tirulokchandar
- Screenplay by: A. C. Tirulokchandar
- Based on: Sontham by Karaikudi Narayanan
- Produced by: R. Venkatraman; K. Arumugam
- Starring: Muthuraman; K. R. Vijaya; Prameela
- Cinematography: M. Viswanath Rai
- Edited by: B. Kandhasamy
- Music by: M. S. Viswanathan
- Production company: Amudham Pictures
- Release date: 6 July 1973
- Country: India
- Language: Tamil

Sontham (transl. Belonging) is a 1973 Indian Tamil-language drama film directed by A. C. Tirulokchandar. The film stars Muthuraman and K. R. Vijaya. It is based on the play of the same name by Karaikudi Narayanan. The film was released on 6 July 1973

== Plot ==
Manickam and Vairam get married but soon separate due to misunderstandings. Later, Manickam remarries Thangam, who dies leaving behind a daughter due to complications during childbirth.

== Cast ==
- Muthuraman as Manickam
- K. R. Vijaya
- Prameela
- Sivakumar
- T. K. Bhagavathi
- V. K. Ramasamy
- Suruli Rajan
- S. N. Parvathy

== Production ==
Sontham is based on the stage play of the same name by Karaikudi Narayanan who also wrote dialogues for the film adaptation. Major Sundarrajan, who portrayed the lead on stage, was replaced by Muthuraman for the screen while Sivakumar reprised his role from the play. The film was produced by R. Venkatraman and K. Aarumugam under Amudham Pictures. A scene involving Muthuraman and Prameela was shot at Vauhini Studios in February 1973.

== Soundtrack ==
The music was composed by M. S. Viswanathan, with lyrics by Kannadasan.

Track listing
No.	Title	Singer(s)	Length
1.	"Kannupada Pogudhu"	P. Susheela, L. R. Eswari
2.	"Nallathan Yosi"	P. Susheela, M. S. Viswanathan
3.	"Nilam Engum"	M. S. Viswanathan
4.	"Vaazhnthal Ungalai"	S. Janaki

== Release and reception ==
Sontham was released on 6 July 1973. Kanthan of Kalki wrote this film is lively without being sluggish, with lots of glides and dips. Navamani praised the dialogues, acting and Tirulokchandar's direction and noted his work in latter part is better than earlier part.
