= Nathayil Muthu =

1973 film by K. S. Gopalakrishnan

- Poster
- Directed by: K. S. Gopalakrishnan
- Written by: K. S. Gopalakrishnan
- Produced by: K. S. Gopalakrishnan
- Starring: K. R. Vijaya; R. Muthuraman
- Cinematography: P. Ramaswamy
- Edited by: R. Devarajan
- Music by: Shankar–Ganesh
- Production company: Chitra Productions
- Release date: 25 October 1973
- Running time: 189 minutes
- Country: India
- Language: Tamil

Nathayil Muthu (transl. Pearl in the snail) is a 1973 Indian Tamil-language film directed, produced and written by K. S. Gopalakrishnan. The film stars K. R. Vijaya and R. Muthuraman, publicised as the former's 100th film as an actress. It was released on 25 October 1973.

== Plot ==
Madhu, the foreign-educated son of a Brahmin lawyer Varadhachari and his wife, falls in love with Chelakannu, an impoverished woman who looks after their cows. While bathing, Chelakannu's sari is washed away and Madhu lends her his clothes. The slum dwellers misconstrue the situation and force Madhu to marry Chelakannu right away, which he willingly does, going to live with her in the slums. However, Chelakannu realises the unfairness of inflicting such discomfort on her husband while his mother schemes to break up the marriage by suggesting Chelakannu is unfaithful to him. Events culminate in a Panchayat which judges in Chelakannu's favour, but when the Panchayat leaders try to abuse Madhu's sister, Chelakannu saves her and this act of generosity persuades Madhu's family that their son's wife is a worthy member of the group.

== Cast ==
- K. R. Vijaya as Chelakannu
- R. Muthuraman as Madhu
- V. S. Raghavan as Varadhachari
- S. Varalakshmi as Varadhachari's wife
- M. R. R. Vasu
- S. V. Subbaiah as Ammasi
- Typist Gopu
- Chandrakantha
- S. Rama Rao
- Kuladeivam Rajagopal
- Indira
- S. R. Janaki

== Production ==
Nathayil Muthu was directed by K. S. Gopalakrishnan, who also produced and wrote it under the banner Chitra Productions. It was publicised as K. R. Vijaya's 100th film as an actress, (Note: Kungumam claims Nathayil Muthu is the 100th film of Muthuraman, and Dheerga Sumangali (1974) as the 100th film of Vijaya.) and cinematography was handled by P. Ramaswamy. Some scenes were shot at a village called Malliyam near Mayavaram.

== Soundtrack ==
The soundtrack was composed by Shankar–Ganesh, while the lyrics were written by Vaali.

Song	Singers	Length
"Nilappaa Konjam Nillappaa"	T. M. Soundararajan	03:51
"Karpanai Vaadhigalin" (Aaadu Raatte)	Seerkazhi Govindarajan & Radha Jayalakshmi	05:02
"Ammamma Enaku"	T. M. Soundararajan & P. Susheela	04:34
"Ragupathi Raagava Raajaaraam"	Seerkazhi Govindarajan & Radha Jayalakshmi	00:44
"Othaiyadi Paadhayile"	T. M. Soundararajan	01:59
"Eeswara Allah...Ragupathi Raagava Raajaaraam"	Radha Jayalakshmi	01:16

== Release and reception ==
Nathayil Muthu was released on 25 October 1973. Playing on the title, Kanthan of Kalki said the film had the "nathai" (snail) but no "muthu" (pearl). Navamani praised Gopalakrishnan's direction and also praised his dialogues while also criticising him for making his characters speak lengthy dialogues while also praising the acting of cast.
