= Amman Arul =

- Directed by: Pattu
- Written by: Bilahari
- Story by: Bilahari
- Produced by: S. Ram / PL. Palaniappan Chettiar
- Starring: A. V. M. Rajan; Jaishankar; Manjula; S. A. Ashokan; Srikanth; Thengai Srinivasan
- Cinematography: D. Rajagopal
- Edited by: R. Vittal
- Music by: Shankar–Ganesh
- Production company: Ambika Movies / Manorama Movies
- Release date: 27 April 1973
- Running time: 134 mins
- Country: India
- Language: Tamil

Amman Arul is a 1973 Indian Tamil-language film directed by Pattu. The film stars A. V. M. Rajan, Jaishankar and Manjula. The film was produced by Nemathanpatti P. L. Palaniappa Chettiar in the name of his son S. Ram under the banner 'Manorama Movies'. Its music was composed by Shankar–Ganesh. The film was released on 27 April 1973.

== Plot ==
Veteran actor Jai Shankar plays the son of the Pannaiyar, who returns from abroad where he studied medicine. Shankhar falls in love with Manjula who is the daughter of the temple priest. Shankhar is an ardent atheist and refuses to accept the presence of god.

Manjula is a motherless girl who desires to get a gold chain for her birthday. A women gives a gold chain to Rajan, asking him to safeguard the chain from her husband while she is out of town. Forced by circumstances to fulfill his word, Rajan presents the chain to his daughter. Manjula accidentally loses the chain while she is bathing in the town lake. Meanwhile, another person gives rs.1000 to A.V.M. Arul to safeguard the chain. He decides to use this to compensate for the chain.

Shankhar is too generous and donates rs.10000 to the temple donation fund. This is protested by his greedy father Pannaiyar Ashokan. Shankhar is bitten by a snake and is saved by the priest and his daughter. Shankar decides to open a free medical facility, but is opposed by his father. For saving his child, Pannaiyar gifts money to the priest's girl, but they refuse, asking whether that was the cost of a life. Shankhar decides to give his late mother's saree to Manjula saying that he imagines that the saree has life in it.

Jai Shankhar falls in love with Manjula rather than his aunt's daughter. Hearing this, Ashokan goes to the temple to seek the goddess's verdict by choosing between two covered sheets of Vibudhi (holy ash) and kumkum. Getting Vibudhi means the goddess is against it. Trying three times, he gets Vibudhi.

Superstitiously, Ashokan believes that the goddess is against it. Ashokan compels his son to abandon his love citing the verdict of the goddess. All become against the goddess due to her verdict and Shankar decides to leave the town and his father. Hearing that his son would leave him, Ashokan goes to the goddess's temple to destroy the temple and the idol. Rajan rushes to save the temple and the idol and after much confrontation with Ashokan, he admits that he placed Vibudhi in both the packets.

The film ends with Rajan admitting his misdeed and changing of the gold chain and the money due to circumstances. He admits his mistakes and the rest is all in peace as per the god's wish.

== Cast ==
- A. V. M. Rajan
- Jaishankar
- Manjula
- S. A. Ashokan
- Srikanth
- A. Sakunthala
- Kumari Padmini
- Thengai Srinivasan
- K. A. Thangavelu
- Oru Viral Krishna Rao
- Jayakumari

== Soundtrack ==
The music was composed by Shankar–Ganesh, with lyrics by Vaali.

Song	Singers
"Akilamellam Vilangum"	Radha Jayalakshmi
"Milli Aduchen Nooru Milli"	Ganesh, L. R. Eswari
"Ondre Ondru"	S. P. Balasubrahmanyam, P. Susheela
"Saatchi Solla"	T. M. Soundararajan, P. Susheela
