= Veettukku Vandha Marumagal =

1973 film

- Poster
- Directed by: R. Vittal
- Screenplay by: Dialogue; A. L. Narayanan; S. Aiyapillai
- Story by: G. Subramania Reddiar
- Produced by: G. Subramania Reddiar
- Starring: A. V. M. Rajan; Ravichandran; Latha; Vennira Aadai Nirmala
- Cinematography: Pl. Nagappa
- Edited by: N. Damodharan
- Music by: Shankar–Ganesh
- Production company: Sri Navaneedha Films
- Release date: 7 September 1973
- Country: India
- Language: Tamil

Veettukku Vandha Marumagal (transl. The daughter-in-law who came home) is a 1973 Indian Tamil-language drama film directed by R. Vittal. The film stars A. V. M. Rajan, Ravichandran, Latha and Vennira Aadai Nirmala. It was released on 7 September 1973.

== Cast ==
List adapted from the film credits

Male cast

- A. V. M. Rajan
- Ravichandran
- Cho
- Isari Velan
- Oru Viral Krishna Rao
- Karikol Raju
- Jeevagan
- Jayaraman
- Vijaya Rao
- Ratnakumar
- Master Rajkumar

Female cast

- Vennira Aadai Nirmala
- Latha
- G. Varalakshmi
- Manorama
- Tambaram Lalitha
- Achchachcho Chitra
- Shanmugasundari
- Gandhimathi
- K. S. Angamuthu
- Vijayakumari
- Vijayarani
- Burma Chandra
- Baby Indra
- A. Sakunthala

Guest artists

- R. Muthuraman
- Thengai Seenivasan
- V. S. Raghavan
- M. N. Rajam

== Production ==
R. Vittal made his debut as a director. The film was shot at AVM, Bharani and Karpagam studios and processing was done at Vijaya Laboratory.

== Soundtrack ==
Music was composed by Shankar–Ganesh while the lyrics were penned by Kannadasan. The song "Oridam Unnidam" was the first released song of Vani Jairam.

Song	Singer/s	Length
"Pennukku Sugam Enbadhum"	T. M. Soundararajan, P. Susheela	04:08
"Sammanthi Veettamma"	L. R. Eswari	03:02
"Oruvan Oruthi"	A. M. Rajah, Jikki	04:20
"Oridam Unnidam"	T. M. Soundararajan, Vani Jairam	04:58

== Critical reception ==
Kanthan of Kalki praised the acting of the star cast and added the film which went swiftly till interval went haywire after that. Navamani praised the acting, humour, dialogues and direction.
