= Thabalkaran Thangai =

1970 film by K. S. Gopalakrishnan

- Theatrical release poster
- Directed by: K. S. Gopalakrishnan
- Written by: K. S. Gopalakrishnan
- Produced by: Balu
- Starring: Gemini Ganesh; Vanisri
- Cinematography: D. V. Nathan
- Edited by: R. Devarajan
- Music by: K. V. Mahadevan
- Production company: Ravi Productions
- Release date: 13 March 1970
- Country: India
- Language: Tamil

Thabalkaran Thangai (/θəbɑːlkɑːrən/ transl. The Postman's Sister) is a 1970 Indian Tamil-language drama film written and directed by K. S. Gopalakrishnan. The film stars Gemini Ganesh and Vanisri. It was released on 13 March 1970.

== Cast ==
Male actors

- Gemini Ganesh as Kannan
- M. N. Nambiar as Kajapathi
- Kaka Radhakrishnan
- Sundarrajan as Devanathan
- Muthuraman as Thiyagarajan
- Nagesh as Logu
- Master Ramu

Female actors

- Vanisri as Lakshmi
- Shylashri
- Sundari Bai
- Sivagami
- Jayakumari
- Kalavathi

Supporting cast

- T. K. Bhagavathi
- M. R. R. Vasu

== Production ==
Thabalkaran Thangai was directed by K. S. Gopalakrishnan, who also wrote the story and dialogue. It was produced by Balu under Ravi Productions. Cinematography was handled by D. V. Nathan, and editing by R. Devarajan.

== Soundtrack ==
The music was composed by K. V. Mahadevan, while the lyrics were written by Kannadasan. The song "Karikalan Katti vaithaan Kallanai" connects Cauvery and Kollidam in an "amourous atmosphere".

== Release and reception ==
Thabalkaran Thangai was released on 13 March 1970. The following day, The Indian Express wrote, "While the picture is certainly recommendable for the absence of vulgarity and the assertion of a sense of values, it is however tedious. It lacks the finesse of K. S. Gopalakrishnan. Technically it is poor. There is hardly any movements of the camera. The story-telling is so much like in his previous movies that KSG has fallen a prey to his technique."
