= A. V. M. Rajan =

Indian actor

A.V.M. Rajan
- Born: Shanmugasundaram; 26 July 1935 (age 91); Pudukottai
- Other name: A.V.M Rajan
- Occupations: Preacher, actor, film producer
- Years active: 1963-1987
- Spouses: Meenakshi (m. 1957) Pushpalatha (m. 1964; died 2025)
- Children: 6, including Mahalakshmi

Shanmugasundaram, known by his stage name A.V.M. Rajan, (26 July 1935) is an Indian preacher, former actor and producer who was active in Tamil cinema. He was one of the top actors in the industry during the 1960s and 1970s.

== Early life ==
Born in Pudukottai, Shanmugasundaram was very eager to join cinema though he held a bachelor's degree in mathematics from Madras University. His higher secondary was at Christian Sweden Mission High School. His parents wanted to see him as a police officer. He came to Madras to take the examination, but he was not deemed fit for the exam. He was not confident as he couldn't straighten his left hand fractured at the age of 14. Instead, while working at Raj Bhavan Guindy Chennai, he tried his luck in cinema, knocking on the doors of every film company to earn a better income. At long last, his efforts yielded result by getting him the opportunity to enter cinema through the film Aayiram Kalathu Payir in which he was introduced as "Raja B.A.".

== Personal life ==
He fell in love with actress Pushpalatha, who starred opposite to him in that film and married her. They have two daughters, the elder one, Mahalakshmi, was an actress between the 1980s and the early 1990s. On 19 January 1984, through a personal encounter with God, Rajan converted and thereafter became a full-time Christian preacher in 1988 and has since then stopped acting in movies and dramas. His wife Pushpalatha, who died in 2025, was a Catholic by birth and hailed from Coimbatore. Following Rajan's conversion, his family too is serving full-time Ministry.

== Career ==
He earned his ‘initials’ after debuting in the film Naanum Oru Penn (1963), which was produced by AVM Productions.

A plethora of offers followed. Rajan soon became a busy artiste donning the role of the hero in many films making a mark with his handsome looks. He carved a niche for himself in the field through his individualistic performance and style. He shared screen space with leading heroes like M. G. R., Sivaji Ganesan, Gemini Ganesan, Jaishankar, R. Muthuraman and Ravichandran. His performance in the films notables such as Enga Veettu Penn (1965), Namma Veettu Lakshmi (1966), Manam Oru Kurangu (1967), Karpooram (1967), Jeevanamsam (1968), Thunaivan (1969), Mannippu (1969), Annaiyum Pithavum (1969), Dharisanam (1970), Engal Thangam (1970), Anadhai Anandhan (1970), Irulum Oliyum (1971) and ...Aval! (1972) were successes.

Mid career, he acted in most of the devotional films such as Agathiyar (1972), Deivam (1972), Thirumalai Deivam (1973), Thiruvarul (1975) and Murugan Adimai (1977). Later, he co-starring with Rajinikanth in the films Thai Meethu Sathiyam (1978), Billa (1980) and Thee (1981). He was also a film producer such as Lorry Driver Rajakannu (1981), Oorum Uravum (1982) and Nandri (1984). His final appearance was in the film Veeran Veluthambi (1987).

== Filmography ==
=== As actor ===
==== Tamil ====
Year	Film	Role	Notes
1963	Aayiram Kalathu Payir	Ratnam	
1963	Naanum Oru Penn	Balu	
1963	Paar Magaley Paar	Sundaram	
1963	Thulasi Maadam	Gopal	
1964	Alli	Babu	
1964	Chitrangi	Jeyveeran	
1964	Pachchai Vilakku	Mani	
1964	Andavan Kattalai	Ramu	
1965	Ennathan Mudivu	Kumaran	Got the title Nadippu Sudar
1965	Veera Abhimanyu	Abhimanyu	
1965	Enga Veettu Penn	Chandran	
1966	Kodimalar	Thambi Durai	
1966	Thattungal Thirakkappadum	Doctor	
1966	Namma Veettu Lakshmi	Chandru	
1966	Major Chandrakanth	Rajinikanth	
1967	Manam Oru Kurangu	Gopinath	
1967	Pandhayam	Somu	
1967	Karpooram	Manikkam	Tamil Nadu State Film Award for Best Actor
1968	Poovum Pottum	Prakash	
1968	Galatta Kalyanam	Mohan	
1968	Thillana Mohanambal	Thangarathnam	
1968	Jeevanamsam	Balu	
1968	Chakkaram	Jambu	
1968	Thulabharam	Ramu	
1969	Thunaivan	Velayudham	
1969	Annaiyum Pithavum	Bhaskar	
1969	Mannippu	Advocate Kumar	
1969	Chellapen		
1969	Magizhampoo	Pasupathy	
1969	Paal Kudam		
1970	Yaen?	Ramu	
1970	Dharisanam	Pandian / Chandramohan	Dual role
1970	Engal Thangam	Moorthy	
1970	Anadhai Anandhan	Selvam	
1970	Noorandu Kalam Vazhga	Rajan	
1971	Deivam Pesuma	Dr Sundaram	
1971	Irulum Oliyum	Thyagarajan (Thyagu)	
1971	Pattondru Ketten		
1971	Thirumagal	Raju	
1972	Agathiyar	Lord Shiva	
1972	Thangadurai	Rangen	
1972	Thaikku Oru Pillai	Thiyagaraj	
1972	Shakthi Leelai	Prohithar	
1972	Deiva Sankalpam	Ravi	
1972	Bathilukku Bathil	Kumaran	
1972	...Aval!	Prakash	
1972	Puguntha Veedu	Bhaskar	
1972	Dheivam	Kadhirvelu	
1973	Prarthanai		
1973	Deivamsam	Raju	
1973	Manipayal	Arun	
1973	Engal Thaai	Ragunath	
1973	Nee Ullavarai		
1973	Amman Arul		
1973	Anbu Sagodharargal	Durairaj	
1973	Nyayam Ketkirom		
1973	Veettu Mappillai		
1973	Thirumalai Deivam	Narathan	
1973	Veettukku Vandha Marumagal		
1973	Pasa Deepam	Rajarathna	
1973	Pennai Nambungal	Ramu	
1973	Manidharil Manikkam	Boopathy	
1974	Sivagamiyin Selvan	Wing Commander Raghu	
1974	Doctoramma	Raja	
1974	Ore Satchi	Madhavan	
1974	Magalukkaga	Muruga	
1974	Murugan Kaattiya Vazhi	Muniyandi	
1974	Pathu Madha Bandham	Chandran	
1975	Enakkoru Magan Pirappan		
1975	Thiruvarul	Kumara Devan	
1976	Rojavin Raja	Gopal	
1976	Thayilla Kuzhandhai		
1977	Murugan Adimai	Shiva	
1977	Navarathinam	Raja	
1977	Unnai Suttrum Ulagam	Film director	
1978	Thai Meethu Sathiyam	Babu's Father	
1980	Billa	Inspector Varma	
1981	Thee	Ramaiah	
1982	Oorum Uravum	Chandrasekhar	
1984	Nandri	DIG	
1987	Veeran Veluthambi	IG	

==== Other languages ====
Year	Film	Role	Language	Notes
1964	Main Bhi Ladki Hoon	Balram	Hindi	Remake of Naanum Oru Penn
1972	Kandavarundo		Malayalam	
1975	Annadammula Anubandham	Venu Gopal Rao	Telugu	

=== As producer ===
- Lorry Driver Rajakannu (1981)
- Oorum Uravum (1982)
- Nandri (1984)
