= I. N. Murthy =

Indian film director

- Born: 1925
- Died: 23 June 2014 (aged 89); Chennai, Tamil Nadu, India
- Occupation: film director
- Children: 3

I. N. Murthy was an Indian film director, known for his spy thrillers, featuring actor Jaishankar in the 1970s.

== Film career ==
Murthy came to Chennai in the early 1950s and worked with directors like Soundararajan Ayyangar, V. Nagayya and T. R. Ramanna. He collaborated with N. T. Rama Rao as the executive director of ‘Seetarama Kalyanam’, an award-winning feature. He introduced stars such as Srividya, Murali Mohan and Giri Babu.

== Partial filmography ==
Year	Film	Language	Notes
1964	Sabhash Suri	Telugu	
1968	Sukha Dukhalu	Telugu	
1969	Atthai Magal	Tamil	
1969	Jagath Kiladeelu	Telugu	
1970	Kannan Varuvan	Tamil	
1972	Kadhalikka Vanga	Tamil	
1972	Delhi To Madras	Tamil	
1972	Varaverpu	Tamil	
1973	Jagame Maya	Telugu	

== Personal life ==
Murthy had three sons. He died on 23 June 2014.
