= Manidharil Manikkam =

- Poster
- Directed by: C. V. Rajendran
- Screenplay by: Vietnam Veedu Sundaram
- Story by: Dr. Nihar Ranjan Gupta
- Starring: Sivaji Ganesan; A. V. M. Rajan; Prameela
- Cinematography: Srikanth
- Edited by: N. M. Shankar
- Music by: M. S. Viswanathan
- Production company: Vasanth Movies
- Distributed by: Sivaji Films
- Release date: 7 December 1973
- Country: India
- Language: Tamil

Manidharil Manikkam (transl. A gem among humans) is a 1973 Indian Tamil-language film, directed by C. V. Rajendran. The film stars Sivaji Ganesan, Prameela and A. V. M. Rajan. It was released on 7 December 1973.

== Cast ==
- Sivaji Ganesan as Dr. Ananth
- A. V. M. Rajan as Boopathy
- Prameela as Ponni
- Major Sundarrajan as D. S. P. Prabhu
- M. N. Rajam as Kalyani
- R. S. Manohar as Rathnam
- Cho as Velu
- Manorama as Rukmani
- Suruli Rajan as Constable Kannaiya
- Pattom Sadan as Ponni Assistant
- Master Ramu as Ramu/Murali
- Baby Chithra as Child Artist

== Production ==
Ganesan's character was inspired by a Conjunctivitis specialist in Madras (later renamed Chennai). The scene where Boopathy rescues Ponni from a thief was shot at Saradha Studios.

== Soundtrack ==
The music was composed by M. S. Viswanathan, while lyrics were written by Kannadasan and Vaali . I will sing for you written by Vaali became popular . Lyricists are in order. https://mossymart.com/product/manitharil-manickam-tamil-film-ep-vinyl-record-by-m-s-viswanathan/.

Song	Singers	Lyrics
"Manam Ullavan Evano"	M. S. Viswanathan	Vaali
"Attamenna Solladi" (I will sing for you)	T. M. Soundararajan	Vaali
"Kanna Nee Vaazhga"	Latha Raju	Kannadasan
"Raathirikku Raathiri"	L. R. Eswari	Vaali
"Oru Paiyala Nambi"	T. M. Soundararajan	Vaali

== Reception ==
Kanthan of Kalki criticised the cinematography, but praised the makers for taking an ordinary story and stretching it to produce good results.
