= Engal Thangam =

- Theatrical release poster
- Directed by: Krishnan–Panju
- Written by: Murasoli Maran
- Produced by: Murasoli Maran
- Starring: M. G. Ramachandran; Jayalalithaa
- Cinematography: S. Maruti Rao; Amirtham
- Edited by: S.Pandjasamy; S.Muthu
- Music by: M. S. Viswanathan
- Production company: Megala Pictures
- Distributed by: Venus Movies
- Release date: 9 October 1970
- Running time: 174 minutes
- Country: India
- Language: Tamil

Engal Thangam (transl. Our Gold) is a 1970 Indian Tamil-language action film directed by Krishnan–Panju. The film stars M. G. Ramachandran and Jayalalithaa. It was released on 9 October 1970 and became a commercial success. It also won three Tamil Nadu State Film Awards.

== Plot ==
Thangam, a truck driver comes to the rescue of Sumathi, his blind younger sister, by claiming responsibility for the offences committed by Moorthy, her husband. Moorthy is a childhood friend of Thangam. Today, Moorthy fell to the hands of a mysterious group of burglars, because he is the best professional safe-cracker in the city. Thangam wants to save him from this gang at all costs. Thangam will be helped in his quest by Kaladevi, his lover.

== Cast ==
- M. G. Ramachandran as Thangam
  - Ramachandran also briefly appears as himself at the beginning of the film
- A. V. M. Rajan as Moorthy
- Jayalalithaa as Kaladevi
- Pushpalatha as Sumathi
- S. A. Ashokan as Selvaraj
- Cho as lorry driver
- Thengai Srinivasan as Pidhambar
- R. S. Manohar as Marthandam

== Production ==
On learning that M. Karunanidhi and Murasoli Maran were financially struggling, M. G. Ramachandran acted in Engal Thangam without taking any remuneration.

== Themes ==
The colours of the Dravida Munnetra Kazhagam (DMK) flag – red and black – are featured in the attire Ramachandran frequently wears in the film as his character. The song "Naan Sethu Pulachavanda", where he sings that he has risen from the dead, is a reference to Ramachandran having survived a gunshot wound inflicted on his throat by M. R. Radha in 1967.

== Soundtrack ==
Music is composed by M. S. Viswanathan, with lyrics by Vaali. The song "Don't Touch Mr X" includes English lyrics. "Thangapadhakkathin Mele" was remixed in Vetrivel Sakthivel (2005).

Track listing
No.	Title	Singer(s)	Length
1.	"Dont Touch Mr X"	T. M. Soundararajan, L. R. Eswari	04:26
2.	"Thangapadkathin"	T. M. Soundararajan, P. Susheela	04:31
3.	"Kadha Kaalatchebam"	T. M. Soundararajan	10:57
4.	"Naan Alavodu Rasipavan"	T. M. Soundararajan, P. Susheela	04:56
5.	"Mogam Piranthadamma"	T. M. Soundararajan	05:16
6.	"Naan Sethu Pulachavanda"	T. M. Soundararajan	03:49
Total length:			33:55

== Release and reception ==
Engal Thangam was released on 9 October 1970, and distributed by Venus Movies. The Indian Express criticised the film for not offering anything new, but lauded Ramachandran's performance of the harikatha and concluded, "One is tired of this kind of movie with a huge bag of morals". The film ran for over 100 days in theatres. It won the Tamil Nadu State Film Award for Best Film – Second Prize, Vaali won the Tamil Nadu State Film Award for Best Lyricist, and Pushpalatha won the Tamil Nadu State Film Award for Best Character Artiste (Female).

== Bibliography ==
- Baskaran, S. Theodore (1996). The Eye of the Serpent: An Introduction to Tamil Cinema. Chennai: East West Books. OCLC 243920437.
- Rajadhyaksha, Ashish; Willemen, Paul (1998) [1994]. Encyclopaedia of Indian Cinema. British Film Institute and Oxford University Press. ISBN 0-19-563579-5.
