= Nyayam Ketkirom =

1973 film by C. V. Rajendran

- Poster
- Directed by: C. V. Rajendran
- Produced by: A. L. Srinivasan
- Starring: R. Muthuraman; A. V. M. Rajan; Vennira Aadai Nirmala; Kanchana
- Music by: K. V. Mahadevan
- Production company: ALS Productions
- Release date: 18 May 1973
- Country: India
- Language: Tamil

Nyayam Ketkirom (transl. We ask for justice) is a 1973 Indian Tamil language film, directed by C. V. Rajendran and produced by A. L. Srinivasan. The film stars R. Muthuraman, A. V. M. Rajan, Vennira Aadai Nirmala, and Kanchana. It was released on 18 May 1973.

== Cast ==
- R. Muthuraman
- A. V. M. Rajan
- Vennira Aadai Nirmala
- Kanchana
- Nagesh
- Manorama
- V. K. Ramasamy
- Cho Ramaswamy
- M. N. Nambiar

== Production ==
A film with the same title was earlier planned by Jayakanthan but did not come to fruition.

== Soundtrack ==
The music was composed by K. V. Mahadevan with lyrics by Kannadasan.

Track listing
No.	Title	Singer(s)	Length
1.	"Mandhiram"	M. Balamuralikrishna
2.	"Uliam Theriyum"	P. Susheela
3.	"Kannan Piranththum Siraichaalai"	T. M. Soundararajan
4.	"Vervai thuligale Pesungal"	T. M. Soundararajan
5.	"Kalyanththai Manathil Vaiththu"	T. M. Soundararajan, P. Suseela
