= Vakkuruthi =

- Directed by: Mohan Gandhiram
- Starring: Jaishankar; Vennira Aadai Nirmala; Major Sundarrajan
- Music by: Shankar–Ganesh
- Production company: Kadhirvel Murugan Films
- Release date: 7 September 1973
- Running time: 130 minutes
- Country: India
- Language: Tamil

Vakkuruthi (/vɑːkkuruði/ transl. Pledge) is a 1973 Indian Tamil-language film starring Jaishankar, Vennira Aadai Nirmala and Major Sundarrajan, with Cho Ramaswamy, Thengai Srinivasan and Anjali Devi appearing in supporting roles. It was released on 7 September 1973.

== Cast ==
Male cast

- Jaishankar as Narendran
- Major Sundarrajan as Nagarajan
- Cho Ramaswamy as Mani
- Thengai Srinivasan as Jambu
- V. S. Raghavan as Moorthy
- S. A. Ashokan ( guest role)

Female cast

- Vennira Aadai Nirmala as Radha
- Anjali Devi as Lakshmi
- Manorama as Ponni
- Tambaram Lalitha as Narendran's adopted mother
- Vijayarani as Jalaja
- R. C. Priya as Dhanabakyam

== Production ==
The film was launched in early February 1973 at Gemini Studios. The scene of Nirmala's marriage was shot at Bharani Studios.

== Soundtrack ==
The music was composed by Shankar–Ganesh.

Song	Singers	Length
"Kanne Thedivanthathu Yugam"	T. M. Soundararajan, P. Susheela	04:30
"Paadangalai Chollida Vaa Paarvaiyile"	T. M. Soundararajan, P. Susheela	04:13
" Nallavar vazhku "	T. M. Soundararajan	04:13

== Reception ==
Kanthan of Kalki praised the performances of the star cast, cinematography, direction and dialogues but felt there were too many songs and none of them were good and concluded it would have been a good film if there were no songs, no glamour, no artificial events.
