= Vennira Aadai Nirmala =

Indian actress

- Born: Shanthi; 27 June 1948 (age 78); Kumbakonam, Thanjor District, Madras presidency,
- Other names: Nirmala (Nimmi), Usha kumari
- Occupation: Actress
- Years active: 1965–present
- Parent(s): Father : Aranmanai L. Balakrishnan; Mother : Radharukmani

Vennira Aadai Nirmala (born as A. B. Shanthi in Kumbakonam) is an Indian actress who has appeared in Tamil, Malayalam and Telugu films. She was a prominent lead actress from 1960s and 70s. She is credited as Ushakumari in Malayalam film industry.

== Personal life ==
She was born as Shanthi to Aranmanai L. Balakrishnan and Radharukmani at Kumbakonam in a Sowrashtra family. She had four siblings. She remains unmarried.

== Acting career ==
Debuting through C. V. Sridhar's Vennira Aadai in 1965, she has acted as lead roles in over 400+ films encompassing four languages - Tamil, Malayalam, Telugu & Kannada. Her screen name in Malayalam films was 'Usha Kumari' In addition to her acting career, Nirmala is a trained Bharatanatyam dancer. She acted in the TV series - Deivamagal.

== Political career ==
MGR had nominated her to the Tamil Nadu Legislative Council. Her swearing in ceremony was scheduled for 23 April 1986. Nirmala had earlier declared insolvency and according to Article 102-(1)(c) of the Indian Constitution, an insolvent person cannot serve as a member of parliament or state legislature.

This annulment made Nirmala's nomination valid and the writ petition against it was dismissed. However, Nirmala withdrew her nomination to the council.

In 1989 Tamil Nadu Assembly Elections, She unsuccessfully contested on behalf of Janaki Faction of AIADMK against then rival faction Leader Jayalalithaa in Bodinayakkanur Assembly constituency.

== Partial filmography ==
This list is incomplete; you can help by expanding it.

=== Tamil ===
Year	Title	Role	Notes
1965	Vennira Aadai	Geetha	Debut Film
1965	Ennathan Mudivu		
1967	Kadhalithal Mattum Podhuma		
1967	Bhakta Prahlada		
1968	Lakshmi Kalyanam		
1968	Chakkaram		
1968	Ragasiya Police 115		
1968	Muthu Chippi		
1968	Kuzhanthaikkaga		
1969	Poova Thalaiya		
1969	Mannippu		
1969	Annaiyum Pithavum		
1969	Kanni Penn		
1969	Thanga Surangam		
1969	Thunaivan		
1970	Enga Mama	Neela	
1970	Veettuku Veedu		
1970	Kannan Varuvan		
1970	Noorandu Kalam Vazhga		
1970	Sangamam		
1970	Yaen?		
1970	Vairakiyam		
1970	Namma Kuzhandaigal		
1971	Babu	Adult Ammu	
1971	Thangaikkaaga		
1971	Deivam Pesuma		
1971	Aathi Parasakthi		
1971	Soodhattam		
1971	Anbukkor Annan		
1971	Needhi Dhevan		
1971	Sudarum Sooravaliyum		
1971	Thanga Gopuram		
1971	Veguli Penn		
1972	Aval		
1972	Bathilukku Bathil		
1972	Thaikku Oru Pillai		
1973	Anbu Sagodharargal		
1973	Engal Thaai		
1973	Pookaari		
1973	Prarthanai		
1973	Vakkuruthi		
1973	Nyayam Ketkirom		
1973	Veettukku Vandha Marumagal		
1973	Nalla Mudivu		
1974	Avalukku Nigar Avale		Also Producer
1974	Pathu Madha Bandham		
1974	Samayalkaran		
1974	Sisubalan		
1975	Ingeyum Manidhargal		
1975	Naalai Namadhe		
1975	Eduppar Kai Pillai		
1975	Idhayakkani		
1975	Maanishaada		
1976	Oorukku Uzhaippavan		
1976	Unakkaga Naan		
1976	Janaki Sabadham		
1977	Ellam Avale		
1977	Indru Pol Endrum Vaazhga		
1977	Maamiyar Veedu		
1977	Meenava Nanban		
1978	Kaviraja Kalamegam		
1978	Karunamoorthi		
1979	Gnana Kuzhandhai		
1979	Nadagame Ulagam		
1979	Velli Ratham		
1980	Kaali		
1980	Kallukkul Eeram		
1980	Guru		
1981	Deiva Thirumanangal		
1981	Bala Nagamma		
1982	Nadodi Raja		
1997	Arunachalam		
1997	Vaimaye Vellum		
2001	Thaalikaatha Kaaliamman		
2002	Kamarasu		
2007	Periyar		
2007	Rameswaram		

=== Malayalam ===
Year	Title	Role	Notes
1965	Kaattuthulasi	Thulasi	
1965	Chettathi	Susheela	
1966	Kallippennu	Kallippennu	
1966	Station Master	Geetha & Omana	
1966	Kayamkulam Kochunni	Nabeesha	
1967	Jeevikkaan Anuvadikkoo		
1967	Ramanan	Karthi	
1967	Iruttinte Athmavu	Prema	
1967	Sheelavathi	Saraswati	
1967	NGO	Shantha	
1967	Thalirukal		
1967	Maadatharuvi		
1967	Sahadharmini		
1968	Yakshi	Vijayalakshmi	
1968	Punnapura Vayalar	Chinnama	
1969	Vilakkappetta Bandhangal		
1969	Koottukudumbam	Radhika	
1969	Janmabhoomi	Madhavi	
1970	Vivaahitha	Leela	
1970	Cross Belt	Leela/Mrs.Robert	
1970	Bheekara Nimishangal	Indira	
1970	Dathuputhran	Omana	
1971	Panchavankaadu	Devamma	
1971	Lora Nee Evide	Lora	
1972	Maravil Thirivu Sookshikkuka	Maalu	
1973	Jesus	Magdalna	
1973	Thenaruvi	Thulasi	
1973	Thaniniram		
1973	Shaasthram Jayichu Manushyan Thottu	Suvarna	
1973	Aashaachakram		
1973	Paavangal Pennungal		
1974	Durga		
1974	Suprabhaatham		
1975	Njaan Ninne Premikkunnu	Gracy	
1975	Thomasleeha		
1976	Amba Ambika Ambaalika	Sathyavathi	
1977	Sreemurukan		
1977	Guruvayoor Keshavan		
1978	Thacholi Ambu		
1978	Hemantharaathri		
1978	Velluvili	Savithri	
1978	Chakraayudham		
1978	Randil Onnu		
1979	Veerabhadran		
1979	Iniyum Kaanaam	Nirmala	
1980	Ashwaradham	Lakshmi	
1980	Bhaktha Hanuman		
1980	Kaanthavalayam		
1981	Kilungaatha Changalakal		
1997	Poomarathanalil		
2001	Sharja To Sharja		

=== Telugu ===
Year	Title	Role	Notes
1966	Gudachari 116		
1967	Bhakta Prahlada		
1967	Ave Kallu		
1968	Papa Kosam		
1969	Mooga Nomu		
1971	Andariki Monagadu		
1971	Bangaru Talli		
1971	Bomma Borusa		
1971	Sati Anasuya		
1972	Kathula Rathaiah		
1972	Bhale Mosagadu		
1972	Datta Putrudu		
1972	Maa Inti Velugu		
1972	Somaripothu		
1973	Dhanama? Daivama?		
1973	Varasuralu		
1974	Sthree Gowravam		
1974	Mangalya Bhagyam		
1976	Devude Gelichadu		
1976	Lawyer Indira Devi		
1977	Chakradhari		
1978	Karunamayudu		
1980	Chukkalo Chandrudu		
1980	Kaali		
1980	Guru		
1980	Sri Vasavi Kanyaka Parameswari Mahatmyam		
1981	Sri Anjaneya Charitra		
1981	Antham Kaadhidi Aarambham		
1998	Sri Sita Ramula Kalyanam Chootamu Raarandi		
2000	Kalisundam Raa		
2000	Jayam Manadera		
2000	Ninne Premistha		
2001	Chinna	Chinna's mother	
2001	Adhipathi		
2002	Seema Simham		
2003	Okariki Okaru		
2004	Arjun		
2004	Shankar Dada M.B.B.S		
2007	Shankar Dada Zindabad		
2010	Ragada		

=== Kannada ===
Year	Title	Role	Notes
1975	Sri Renukadevi Mahathme		
1985	Kari Naga		

== Television serials ==
Year	Title	Role	Channel	Notes
2000	Micro Thodargal- Mounam Oru Bashai		Raj TV	
2001	Meendum Meendum Sirippu		Sun TV	
2004–2006	Kalki		Jaya TV	
2006-2007	Raja Rajeswari		Sun TV	
2008	Manikoondu	Parvathi Devi	Sun TV	
2013–2018	Deivamagal	Janaki Chidambaram	Sun TV	
2004	Aaradhana		Doordarshan	Producer, Screenplay writer and Actor; A series on Indian Music Composers
2007	Be'zubaan		Doordarshan	A Tele series in Hindi
2009	Sri Aandal		Doordarshan	Dance Drama
2009-2010	Pushpanjali		Doordarshan	A Tele series
2012-2017	Konjum Salangai & Dheem Tharikita		DD Podhigai	Tele series based on Classical dance competition among children telecasted for over five years.
2021	Saadhana Bharatam		YouTube	YouTube Channel which explores Bharatanatyam

== Awards and honours ==
- 2009; Kaviarasu Kannadasan Tamizh Sangam Award
