= Prarthanai =

- Theatrical release poster
- Directed by: Kausikan
- Screenplay by: Kausikan
- Dialogue by: A. L. Narayanan
- Story by: Kausikan
- Produced by: Venkat Varadhan
- Starring: A. V. M. Rajan; Sowcar Janaki; Vennira Aadai Nirmala
- Cinematography: B. Ramachandrayya
- Edited by: S. I. Perumal
- Music by: T. K. Ramamoorthy
- Production company: Chitra Lok Productions
- Release date: 14 January 1973
- Country: India
- Language: Tamil

Prarthanai (/prɑːrθənaɪ/ transl. Prayer) is a 1973 Indian Tamil-language film directed and co-written by Kausikan. The film stars A. V. M. Rajan, Sowcar Janaki and Vennira Aadai Nirmala, with Srikanth and Sasikumar in supporting roles. It was released on 14 January 1973.

== Cast ==
- A. V. M. Rajan
- Sowcar Janaki
- Vennira Aadai Nirmala
- Srikanth
- Sasikumar
- Cho
- Thengai Srinivasan
- Suruli Rajan
- Kuladeivam Rajagopal
- Junior T. S. Balaiah
- Manorama
- Sridevi
- K. R. Devaki
- Lakshmi
- Parvathi
- Karikol Raju

== Soundtrack ==
The music was composed by T. K. Ramamoorthy, with lyrics by Vaali.

Track listing
No.	Title	Singer(s)	Length
1.	"Kadhal Piranthadhu"	P. Susheela
2.	"Oru Vaarthai Nee"	T. M. Soundararajan, P. Susheela

== Critical reception ==
Kanthan of Kalki called the story as somewhat innovative, but felt it could have had better pacing as the songs were dragging. Navamani applauded the director for taking an ordinary, clichéd story and making it watchable.
