= Nagesh =

Indian actor and comedian (1933–2009)

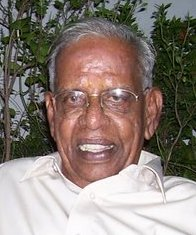
- Nagesh in 2005
- Born: Cheyur Krishna Rao Nageswaran; 27 September 1933; Dharapuram, Coimbatore District, British India (now Tiruppur District Tamil Nadu, India)
- Died: 31 January 2009 (aged 75); Chennai, Tamil Nadu, India
- Other names: Thaai Nagesh; Thai Dhandapani
- Occupations: Actor; comedian
- Years active: 1958– 2008
- Spouse: Regina (m. 1957; died 2002)
- Children: 3 including Anand Babu
- Parent(s): Father : Krishna Rao; Mother : Rukmani

Cheyur Krishna Rao Nageswaran (27 September 1933 – 31 January 2009), popularly known as Nagesh, was an Indian actor and comedian mostly remembered for his comic roles in Tamil films during the 1960s. He acted in over 1,000 films from 1958 to 2008, performing in a variety of roles as a comedian, lead and supporting actor, and antagonist. He also acted in Telugu, Malayalam, and Kannada films. Nagesh's style of comedy was largely inspired by Hollywood actor Jerry Lewis. Similarities between Nagesh and Lewis earned Nagesh the sobriquet the "Jerry Lewis of India". He was also nicknamed as the King of Comedy due to his comedic timing and body language.

== Early life ==
Nagesh was born as Cheyur Krishna Nageswaran to Kannadiga Hindu parents in Dharapuram. His parents were Krishna Rao and Rukmani Ammal. Nagesh was born in Dharapuram. He completed his schooling in Dharapuram. He left Dharapuram at an early age and moved to Madras city in search of a career. His roommates, the writer Vaali and actor Srikanth, later established themselves as prominent personalities in Tamil cinema. He worked as a clerk in the Indian Railways.

== Film career ==
=== Early career (1958-1961) ===
Early in his life, he saw the Tamil play Kamba Ramayanam, enacted by his colleagues, and felt that he could do a good job. He persuaded the secretary of the railway's cultural association to give him the role of a man suffering from stomach pain. MGR, then chief guest, seeing this play, in his speech praised Nagesh for his performance. From then onwards, Nagesh played small roles in various drama troupes.

He got his first break in the film Manamulla Maruthaaram (1958), in which Balaji played the lead role.

Though he had his initial training in theatre, he did not carry any baggage from the stage to the screen. He intuitively understood the difference between the two mediums. That turned out to be his strong point. It was a time when the comedian Chandrababu was fading out of Tamil cinema, having lost his money and health, and Nagesh could slide into that slot comfortably.

His variety of humour was wholesome and free from double entendres. It was also a time when the Jerry Lewis-Dean Martin duo was at the height of its glory in Hollywood. Nagesh was greatly influenced by Jerry Lewis, as can be seen from his early films.

Nagesh won critical acclaim for his performance in the movie Thayilla Pillai (1961).

=== Rise to prominence (1962-1975) ===
Nageshs role as a ward boy in Nenjil Or Aalayam (1962) established his position. Sridhar, the director of that movie, was also on the rise and he signed up Nagesh in some of his most successful films such as the 1964 comedy Kadhalikka Neramillai.

The great actor's performance as a hospital ward boy in Nenjil Or Aalayam earned him the success and he followed it up with some powerful roles in Periya Idathu Penn (1963), Server Sundaram (1964), Enga Veettu Pillai (1965), Neerkumizhi (1965) and Anbe Vaa (1966).

There was T. R. Ramanna’s Panakkara Kudumbam (1964) where Nagesh acted in four roles as son, father, grandfather and great-grandfather.

Nagesh rose to prominence through Server Sundaram (1964) for which he received praise for his evergreen comedy performances as a server in a hotel. The film was helmed by director duo Krishnan–Panju and the screenplay had been written by K. Balachander. It also marked the first collaboration between Nagesh and K. Balachander. Since then it led to many successful collaborations between the two.

Nagesh’s screen persona combined style and substance. Witty dialogue delivered with a superb sense of timing, mimicry, mannerisms, facial expressions ranging from grotesque contortions to deadpan countenance, slapstick and humorous body language were his hallmarks. He also became to lead actor in some films. Many of these did not do well at the box office presumably due to a mental block among fans in seeing comedians as heroes. Nevertheless, Nagesh’s acting brought in rave reviews. Some like Server Sundaram (1964) and Edhir Neechal (1968) were blockbusters.

He featured regularly in the film projects of M.G.R and Sivaji Ganesan even at a time when there was a massive rift between the two leading actors in Tamil cinema at that time.

In the case of Nagesh, one can never forget his memorable roles in various films. He dominated the industry in the 1960s.

The director who brought out the best in Nagesh was K. Balachander. Neerkumizhi (1965), Naanal (1965), Major Chandrakanth (1966), Bama Vijayam (1967), Anubavi Raja Anubavi (1967), Thamarai Nenjam (1968), Edhir Neechal (1968), Poova Thalaiya (1969), Iru Kodugal (1969), Navagraham (1970), Patham Pasali (1970) and Apoorva Raagangal (1975) were all films by Balachander where Nagesh provided marvellous displays of his histrionic talents.

=== Resurgence and rewards (1976-1994) ===
Nagesh who was riding the crest of a wave as the popular actor had a big decline in the late seventies and early eighties. While his popularity with fans had not decreased film producers were reluctant to cast him in their movies. This was due to Nagesh becoming an alcoholic. The problems he caused producers, directors and co-stars made him an untouchable. Thus Nagesh faded away from the public gaze for many years.

He played the role of writer Jayakanthan in the 1977 movie Sila Nerangalil Sila Manithargal. Nagesh appeared as himself in Thillu Mullu (1981), the Tamil remake of Gol Maal. Nagesh's career enjoyed a partial resurgence from the 1980s onwards when he acted in a number of movies, mostly in elderly roles, some of them as the villain.

Nagesh had a good relationship with Kamal Haasan, with whom he had co-starred in a variety of movies between 1975 and the 2000s. Kamal Haasan cast Nagesh in most of his self-productions regularly. His most remembered role as a villain was in the 1989-hit Apoorva Sagodharargal. Kamal Haasan again gave a role for Nagesh in the comedy flick Michael Madana Kama Rajan (1990). During the shooting of Michael Madana Kama Rajan, Nagesh pretended to be disappointed and unhappy over his role as Avinashi and had also argued in jest with Kamal Haasan. He even acted as a dead body in the 1994 film Magalir Mattum. He won a National Film Award for Best Actor in a Supporting Role for his role in Nammavar (1994).

=== Later years (1995-2008) ===
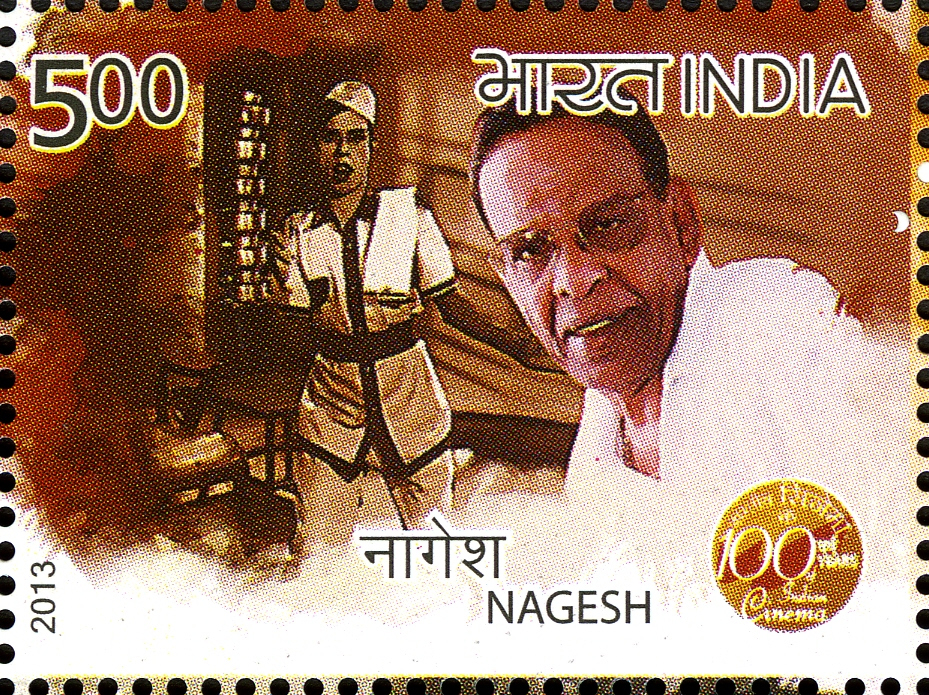
Nagesh in 2013 Stamp of India

Nagesh did a series of supporting roles in the 1990s and 2000s.

Subsequently, he starred in numerous notable films, including Ayudha Poojai (1995), Poove Unakkaga (1996), Tholi Prema (1998), Kaathala Kaathala (1998), Rhythm (200), Minnale (2001) and Poovellam Un Vaasam (2001).

Nagesh acted in Tamil films till a few months before his death in 2009. Notable among some of his later movies were Panchathanthiram (2002), Vasool Raja MBBS (2004), Imsai Arasan 23m Pulikesi (2006) and his last appearance Dasavathaaram (2008). However, an animated version of him was seen in the 2014 performance capture film Kochadaiiyaan.

== Awards ==
- 1974 — Kalaimamani
- 1994 — National Film Award for Best Supporting Actor for Nammavar
- 1994 — Tamil Nadu State Film Award Special Prize for Nammavar
- 1995 — Filmfare Lifetime Achievement Award – South

== Death ==
Nagesh was a chain smoker and a heavy drinker. However, he gradually gave up these habits when he was dangerously ill during the period 1978–1982. His health began to decline in late 2008 due to progressive heart ailments. In November 2008, his health conditions further deteriorated when he slipped and fell down at his home which also resulted in a severe head injury. He died on 31 January 2009 at the age of 75 due to diabetes and a heart ailment.

== Filmography ==
=== Tamil films ===
Year	Film	Role	Notes
1958	Manamulla Maruthaaram		
1959	Thamarai Kulam		
1959	Penn Kulathin Pon Vilakku		
1960	Uthami Petra Rathinam		
1961	Thayilla Pillai	Mohan	
1962	Nenjil Or Aalayam	Ward boy	
1962	Annai		Cameo
1962	Deivathin Deivam		
1962	Policekaran Magal	Servant	
1962	Sumaithaangi		
1963	Mani Osai		
1963	Panathottam	Ramu	
1963	Periya Idathu Penn	Arulappan alias Pitamdhi	
1963	Naanum Oru Penn	Chidambaram	
1963	Kunkhumam	Arasan	
1963	Nenjam Marappathillai	Veeraiyaa	
1963	Ratha Thilagam	Madurai	
1963	Naan Vanangum Deivam	Nagu	
1963	Parisu	Jimmy	
1963	Annai Illam	Godhandam	
1964	Vettaikkaran	Jokkar	
1964	Alli	Kathiri	
1964	Kaadhalikka Neramillai	Chellappa	
1964	Pachai Vilakku	Joseph	
1964	En Kadamai	Thrilokam	
1964	Panakkara Kudumbam	Raman	
1964	Deiva Thai	Vidwan Sargunam	
1964	Padagotti	Ponvandu	
1964	Puthiya Paravai	Sanjeevi	
1964	Thozhilali	Kithan	
1964	Kalai Kovil		
1964	Server Sundaram	Sundaram	Lead role
1964	Thayin Madiyil		
1964	Navarathri	Village priest	
1964	Muradan Muthu		
1965	Aayirathil Oruvan	Alagan	
1965	Aasai Mugam	Sankara	
1965	Anandi	Thambi Durai	
1965	Enga Veettu Pillai	Govindhan	
1965	Panam Padaithavan	Balu	
1965	Kakkum Karangal	Soma Sundaram	
1965	Kalangarai Vilakkam	Vasu	
1965	Kuzhandaiyum Deivamum	Sundaram	
1965	Panchavarna Kili	Kalyanam	
1965	Santhi	Paramanandam	
1965	Neerkumizhi	Sethu	Lead role
1965	Thaayum Magalum		
1965	Poojaikku Vandha Malar	Panju	
1965	Veera Abhimanyu	Uthrakumaran	
1965	Thiruvilayadal	Dharumi	
1965	Kanni Thai	Estate manager's son	
1965	Vaazhkai Padagu		
1965	Santhi	Paramanandam	
1965	Neela Vaanam	Prakash	
1966	Anbe Vaa	Ramaiah	
1966	Chitthi	Widower's son	
1966	Kodimalar	Annamalai	
1966	Naam Moovar		
1966	Madras to Pondicherry	Conductor	
1966	Muharasi	Police Constable 501	
1966	Avan Pithana?	Chinnaya	
1966	Major Chandrakanth	Mohan	Lead role
1966	Motor Sundaram Pillai	Saambu	
1966	Namma Veettu Lakshmi	Raju	
1966	Nadodi	Valippu Manickam	
1966	Naan Aanaiyittal	Appu the Great	
1966	Mahakavi Kalidas	Oviyar	Guest appearance
1966	Chandrodayam	Alwar	
1966	Sadhu Mirandal	Kabali	Lead role
1966	Saraswati Sabatham	Prison warden	
1966	Thenmazhai	Venu	
1966	Thaaye Unakkaga	Neelu	
1966	Yaarukkukaha Azhudhan	Joseph	
1966	Thaali Bhagyam	Singaran	
1966	Thanippiravi	Chowry	
1966	Selvam	Kathakalachebam Iyer	
1967	Kandhan Karunai	Nageswaran	
1967	Aalayam	Simon	
1967	Adhey Kangal	Baskar's friend	
1967	Anubavi Raja Anubavi	Thangamuthu and Manikkam	
1967	Bama Vijayam	Krishnan	
1967	Pesum Deivam	Murali	
1967	Bhavani		
1967	Thangai	Vittal	
1967	Engalukkum Kalam Varum		Lead role
1967	Iru Malargal	Principal	
1967	Arasa Kattalai	Tribal leader	
1967	Thiruvarutchelvar	Ponnan	
1967	Kaavalkaran	Gobi (alias Gobinath)	
1967	Ninaivil Nindraval	Dr. Thirupathy	
1967	Maadi Veettu Mappilai	Sankaran	
1967	Pattanathil Bhootham	Cheenu	
1967	Vivasayi	Chokkan	
1967	Pandhayam		
1967	Thaikku Thalaimagan	Kuppu	
1967	Ooty Varai Uravu	Balu	
1967	Naan	Sundaram	
1968	Poovum Pottum	Sukumar	
1968	Motor Sundaram Pillai	Shambu	
1968	Thirumal Perumai	Raman	Cameo
1968	Andru Kanda Mugam	Subbusamy	
1968	Ther Thiruvizha	Vel	
1968	Galatta Kalyanam	Chandran	
1968	Ethir Neechal	Maadhu	Lead role
1968	Thulabharam		
1968	Ner Vazhi		
1968	Deiveega Uravu	Manikkam	
1968	Galatta Kalyanam	Chandran	
1968	Jeevanaamsam	Advocate Ramanujam	
1968	Kudiyiruntha Kovil	Jaya's elder brother	
1968	Kalangarai Vilakkam	Vasu	
1968	Panakkara Pillai	Mani	
1968	Pudhiya Boomi	Sivamani	
1968	Ragasiya Police 115	Balakrishnan	
1968	Soaappu Seeppu Kannadi	Madhusudhanan a.k.a. Madhu	Lead role
1968	Thamarai Nenjam	Narayanan	
1968	Thillana Mohanambal	Vaithi	
1968	Kadhal Vaaganam	Doctor	
1968	En Thambi	Sabapathy	
1968	Enga Oor Raja	Chakravarthy	
1968	Kadhal Vaaganam	Chellappin	
1968	Jeevanamsam	Advocate Ramanujam	
1968	Chakkaram		
1969	Akka Thangai	Raju	
1969	Thanga Surangam	Mani	
1969	Poova Thalaiya	Nagesh	
1969	Subha Dinam	Raja bathar	
1969	Deiva Magan	Boopathy	
1969	Anbalippu	Shanmugam	
1969	Kaaval Dheivam	Kesavan	
1969	Kulavilakku		
1969	Shanti Nilayam	Ramu	
1969	Anjal Petti 520	Chandru / Stephan	
1969	Thunaivan	Paramasivam	
1969	Ponnu Mappillai	Sethu	
1969	Nam Naadu	Govindha	
1969	Thirudan	Ranga	
1969	Sivandha Mann	Dickie	
1969	Mannippu	Nalla Muthu	
1970	Penn Deivam		
1970	Thabalkaran Thangai	Logu	
1970	Vietnam Veedu	Murali	
1970	Kann Malar	Ponnambalam	
1970	Thalaivan	Pandjavarnam	
1970	Ethiroli	Krishna Rao	
1970	Maanavan	Ramu	
1970	Veetukku Veedu	Pattusamy	
1970	Anadhai Anandhan		
1970	Engirundho Vandhaal	Viswanathan (alias) Vichu	
1970	Sorgam	Gajendran / Gajini	
1971	Iru Thuruvam	Ayyasamy / Mama	
1971	Uttharavindri Ulle Vaa	Raju	
1971	Nootrukku Nooru	Ramesh	
1971	Kulama Gunama	Kalimann	
1971	Praptham	Ponnan	
1971	Kettikaran	Dance Master Jayapal	
1971	Veguli Penn	Mohan	
1971	Sumathi En Sundari	Mannangatti Sundaram	
1971	Irulum Oliyum	Mohanarangam's assistant	
1971	Annai Velankanni	Kannaiah	
1971	Thenum Paalum	Balu	
1971	Sabatham	Shanmugam	
1971	Savaale Samali	Chinna Pannai Singaram	
1971	Moondru Deivangal	Nagu	
1971	Thirumagal	Subbusamy	
1971	Then Kinnam	Mohan	
1971	Babu	Thulukanam	
1971	Punnagai	Rajbabu	
1972	Dhikku Theriyadha Kaattil	Constable 1	
1972	Pillaiyo Pillai		
1972	Nalla Neram	Kurka	
1972	Dharmam Engey	Kurka	
1972	Ganga		
1972	Naan Yen Pirandhen	Sabhabadhi	
1972	Vasantha Maligai	Panchavarnam	
1972	Bathilukku Bathil		
1972	Hello Partner		Lead role
1972	Idho Endhan Deivam		
1972	Annamitta Kai	Thangaman	
1972	Raman Thediya Seethai	Krishnan (Kishtan)	
1972	Deivam	Banana vendor	
1973	Prarthanai		
1973	Maru Piravi		
1973	Ulagam Sutrum Valiban	Markandeyan	
1973	Engal Thanga Raja	Gopi	
1973	Engal Thaai	Gopi	
1973	Komatha En Kulamatha	Ramu	
1973	Nyayam Ketkirom		
1973	Pattikaattu Ponnaiya	Murugan	
1973	Gauravam	Gopal Iyer	
1974	Paruva Kaalam	Swamy Kamalanandham	
1974	Gumasthavin Magal	Appusamy Josiyar	
1974	Murugan Kattiya Vazhi	Priest	
1974	Urimaikural	Sadhasivam	
1975	Pattampoochi	Vadivelu	
1975	Naalai Namadhe	Rangu alias Rathavandhu	
1975	Mannavan Vanthaanadi	Thalapathy / C.I.D. Sivanandam	
1975	Apoorva Raagangal	Suri / Hari	
1975	Anbe Aaruyire	Ramesh	
1975	Dr. Siva	Babu	
1975	Thiruvarul	Ponnan	
1976	Manushulanta Okkate	Ganapathi	
1976	Vaanga Sambandhi Vaanga		
1976	Uzhaikkum Karangal	Saba / Kitha	
1976	Unakkaga Naan	Dhanarajan alias Lenindasan	
1976	Aattukara Alamelu	Varadhachary	
1976	Satyam	Ambi	
1976	Thayilla Kuzhandhai		
1976	Naalai Namadhe	Rangu alias Rathavandhu	
1977	Dheepam	Rahim Bai	
1977	Murugan Adimai	Driver's brother-in-law	
1977	Navarathinam	Ratnam	
1977	Meenava Nanban	Ratnam	
1977	Aasai Manaivi		
1977	Ilaya Thalaimurai	Sharma	
1977	Sorgam Naragam		
1977	Sri Krishna Leela	Sudhama	
1977	Naam Pirandha Mann	Thavasu	
1978	Oru Nadigai Natakam Parkiral	Raghavan	
1978	Sila Nerangalil Sila Manithargal	R. K. Viswanatha Sarma	
1978	Tripurasundari		
1978	Rudhra Thaandavam	Ponnambalam	
1978	Thyagam		
1978	Varuvan Vadivelan	Vijay's brother	
1978	Radhai Ketra Kannan		
1978	Thai Meethu Sathiyam		
1979	Dhairya Lakshmi		
1979	Velli Ratham		
1979	Thaayillamal Naan Illai	Mannargudi Minor	Guest appearance
1979	Veettukku Veedu Vasappadi	Latha's father	
1979	Azhage Unnai Aarathikkiren	Victor	
1979	Gnana Kuzhandhai	Namachivayam	
1979	Neela Malargal	Parthasarathy	
1979	Nallathoru Kudumbam		Special appearance
1979	Annai Oru Aalayam	Himself	
1979	Mangala Vaathiyam	Kanakku	
1980	Natchathiram		
1980	Sujatha		
1980	Engal Vathiyaar	Krishna Das	
1980	Anbukku Naan Adimai	Sekhar	
1980	Polladhavan		
1980	Adhirstakaran		
1980	Bhama Rukmani	Advocate Seshadhri "Seshu"	
1981	Mohana Punnagai	Narasimmachari	
1981	Thillu Mullu	Himself	Cameo
1981	Arumbugal		
1981	Amarakaaviyam	Devdas	
1981	Kalthoon	Devdas	
1981	Kadal Meengal	Peter	
1981	Jadhikkoru Needhi		
1982	Vaa Kanna Vaa	Ezhumalai	
1982	Thooku Medai		
1984	Priyamudan Prabhu		
1984	Magudi		
1984	Thenkoodu		
1985	Paadum Vaanampadi	Muthu	Guest appearance
1985	Padikkaadhavan	Rahim	
1986	Maaveeran	Raja's mother	
1987	Cooliekkaran	Velu	
1987	Ivargal Varungala Thoongal		
1989	Apoorva Sagodharargal	Dharmaraj	
1989	Raaja Raajathan	Thyagi Sathyamoorthy	Guest appearance
1989	Mounam Sammadham	Paramasivam	
1989	Meenakshi Thiruvilayadal	Poojari	
1990	Athisaya Piravi	Murukesh	
1990	Engal Swamy Ayyappan	Salim Bhai	
1990	Pudhu Pudhu Ragangal		
1990	Raja Kaiya Vacha	Vijaya's father	
1991	Nanbargal	Rajasekhar	
1991	Gopura Vasalile		
1991	Cheran Pandiyan	Maniyam	
1991	Michael Madana Kama Rajan	Avinashi	
1991	Thalapathi	Panthulu	
1991	Putham Pudhu Payanam	Dr. M. Kumaresan	Guest appearance
1991	Thalapathi	Panthulu	
1992	Rickshaw Mama	Minister Duraisamy	
1992	Thambi Pondatti	Venugopal	
1992	Purushan Enakku Arasan		
1993	Enga Thambi	Muthu	
1993	Amma Ponnu	Vathiyar	
1993	Kattabomman	Kattabomman's grandfather	
1994	Magalir Mattum	A dead body	
1994	Nammavar	Prabhakar Rao	Winner–National Film Award for Best Supporting Actor
1995	Marumagan		
1995	Kizhakku Malai		
1995	Ayudha Poojai	Police Officer	
1996	Poove Unakkaga	Stephen	
1996	Meendum Savithri	Ramamoorthy	
1996	Avvai Shanmugi	Joseph	
1997	Raasi	Freedom fighter	
1997	Pagaivan	Church Father	
1997	Thadayam	Jyothi's Grandfather	
1997	Poochudavaa		
1998	Desiya Geetham		
1998	Kaathala Kaathala	Chokkalingam	
2000	Rhythm	Karthikeyan's father	
2001	Minnale	Subramani	
2001	Poovellam Un Vasam	Chinna's grandfather	
2002	Panchathanthiram	Parthasarathy	
2002	Bala	Annachi	
2003	Kadhal Kondain	Church Father	
2003	Indru Mudhal	Krishna's grandfather	
2004	Vasool Raja MBBS	Sriman Venkatraman	
2004	Bose	Bose's grandfather	
2006	Saravana	Saravana's grandfather	
2006	Imsai Arasan 23rd Pulikecei	Raja Mokkaiyappar	
2007	Pori	Hari's father	
2007	Nenjai Thodu	Siva's grandfather	
2008	Dasavathaaram	Sheikh	
2014	Kochadaiiyaan	Shambumithrar	Animation – played by similar appearance person

=== Telugu films ===
Year	Film	Role	Notes and Ref.
1966	Mohini Bhasmasura	Devotee of Vishnu	
1972	Papam Pasivadu	Pilot	
1972	Hanthakulu Devanthakulu	Nagesh Khanna	
1973	Manchi Vallaki Manchivadu	Obaiah	
1973	Doctor Babu	Special appearance	
1975	Soggadu	Sanyasi Rao	
1976	Aadavalu Apanindhalu		
1976	Thoorpu Padamara	Shivaranjani's family doctor	
1977	Savasagallu		
1977	Gadusu Pillodu	Kailasam	
1978	Indradhanussu	Chakram	
1978	Pottelu Punnamma	Varadhachari	
1979	Allari Vayasu	Gopi	
1979	Sri Rama Bantu	Lord Hanuman	
1979	Vetagadu	Ponnusamy	
1979	Oka Challani Rathri	Dr. Rao	
1979	Urvasi Neeve Naa Preyasi	Victor	
1980	Mayadari Krishnudu		
1981	Kondaveeti Simham	Sitapati	
1981	Gadasari Attaha Sosagara Kodalu		
1981	Devudu Mamayya		
1982	Justice Chowdary	Anthony	
1982	Doctor Cine Actor		
1982	Nivuru Gappina Nippu		
1982	Devatha		
1983	Muddula Mogudu	Simham	
1983	Amarajeevi	Babu	
1983	Sri Ranga Neethulu	Dr. Sundara Murthy	
1984	Kode Trachu	Rambabu	
1984	Koteeswarudu	Little Boss	
1984	Sahasame Jeevitham	Babu Rao	
1984	Anubandham	Tata Rao	
1984	Kanchu Kagada	Jaggu	
1985	Prachanda Bhairavi	Kodandam	
1985	Illale Devatha		
1985	Pelli Meeku Akshintalu Naaku		
1985	Sri Katna Leelalu	Panganamalu	
1985	Bhale Tammudu	Siva Rao	
1986	Car Diddina Kapuram	Pulla Rao	
1986	Aadi Dampatulu		
1986	Thatayya Kankanam		
1987	Rowdy Babai		
1987	Trimurtulu	Ad Film Hero	
1987	Akshintalu		
1987	Thene Manasulu	Seshu	
1987	Bhanumati Gari Mogudu	Lawyer Chinta Singinadham	
1988	Praja Pratinidhi		
1988	Brahma Putrudu		
1989	Indrudu Chandrudu	Minister	
1989	Lankeswarudu		
1991	Sathruvu	Sambaya	
1991	Vidhata	Somasundaram	
1992	Allari Mogudu	Sivasamba Deekshutulu	
1992	Pattudala		
1992	Brundavanam	Perumallu	
1993	One By Two		
1994	Madam	Rayudu	
1994	Gandeevam	Idea Appa Rao	
1994	Brahmachari Mogudu	Retired Army Colonel	
1994	Kishkindha Kinda		
1996	Sri Krishnarjuna Vijayam		
1996	Neti Savithri	Ramamoorthy	
1997	Subhakankshalu	Stephen	
1998	Tholi Prema	Balu's uncle	
2000	Maa Pelliki Randi	Papa Rayudu	
2000	Balaram	Rao Bahadur Lakshmi Varaprasad	

=== Malayalam films ===
Year	Film	Role	Notes
1977	Aparadhi	Goldsmith Rankan	
1981	Valarthumrugangal	Naanu	
1981	Sreeman Sreemathi	Subbaraman	
1982	Ezham Rathri		
1991	Kalari	Manickam	
1993	O' Faby	Muthusaami	
1996	Swarnachamaram		Unreleased film

=== Kannada films ===
Year	Film	Role	Notes
1993	Gadibidi Ganda	Singer	
1997	Ee Hrudaya Ninagaagi		
2000	Preethsu Thappenilla	Balu's uncle	

=== Director ===
Year	Title	Notes
1985	Paartha Gnabagam Illayo	
