= R. Muthuraman =

Indian actor

- Muthuraman in Server Sundaram
- Born: Muthuraman Radhakrishnan; 4 July 1929; Orathanadu, Thanjavur, British India
- Died: 16 October 1981 (aged 52); Ooty, Tamil Nadu, India
- Other name: Navarasa Thilagam
- Occupations: Actor, producer
- Years active: 1955–1981
- Spouse: Sulochana
- Children: 4 including Karthik
- Relatives: Gautham Karthik (grandson)

Muthuraman Radhakrishnan (4 July 1929 – 16 October 1981) was an Indian actor who predominantly worked in Tamil cinema. He was a leading actor during the 1960s and 1970s and was known as Navarasa Thilagam (Pride of emotions) for his versatile acting and language proficiency. He had paired with all the leading heroines of his time performing in main and character roles.

== Early life ==
Muthuraman was born on 4 July 1929 to Radhakrishnan Onthiriyar and Rathnavathi in Orathanadu Taluk -Okkanadu melayur, a town in the erstwhile Thanjavur district of Tamil Nadu in a Kallar (Thevar) family and a family that had no stage or acting links. He was the son of an advocate and his uncle was a police officer. However, in his youth he was attracted to films and the fine arts. He joined the field much later in life, as he first became a government employee due to family pressure.

== Film career ==
Muthuraman was a stage actor in his early days. He joined veteran actor S.S. Rajendran's SSR Nataka Mandram and then Seva Stage and acted in numerous dramas, including Manimagudam, Muthumandapam and Bharathiyar's poetic dramas.

He went to play many roles in about 100 movies in the sixties and seventies. Although he was a player in an era dominated by stalwarts such as M G Ramachandran, Sivaji Ganesan and Gemini Ganesan, he made a name and place for himself as a popular actor. He was paired with most heroines of the time, including Chandrakanta, Rajasree, Devika, L. Vijayalakshmi, Lakshmi, Vennira Aadai Nirmala, Vijaya Nirmala, Vanisri, Sujatha, Bharathi, Srividya, Sridevi, Jayalalithaa, Sripriya, but his most constant heroine with whom he was paired for a record of 19 times was K. R. Vijaya.

He starred in many successful films, in co-hero roles in movies such as Kaadhalikka Neramillai (1964), Ooty Varai Uravu (1967), and supporting roles in movies such as Server Sundaram (1964) and Moondru Deivangal (1971). Muthuraman also established a production company, Muthukarthik Pictures.

== Family ==
Muthuraman was married to Sulochana. The couple had four children, the youngest of whom, Karthik, became a popular Tamil film actor.

== Death ==
In October 1981, Muthuraman arrived at Ooty to attend the shooting for Ayiram Muthangal. When he was jogging as part of a routine exercise, he collapsed on the road and became unconscious. Actor Sivakumar who had stayed in the same place, was told that Muthuraman was lying unconscious on the street thereafter Muthuraman was rushed to the hospital by actor Sivakumar. The doctor declared Muthuraman dead on arrival. He was 52 years old at the time of his death.

== Filmography ==
=== 1950s ===
Year	Title	Role	Notes
1956	Rangoon Radha	Lawyer	Uncredited
1957	Karpukkarasi	Minister of Karpagatheevu	Uncredited
1959	Thanga Padhumai	Sithabramai Patient	Uncredited
1959	Mala Oru Mangala Vilakku		
1959	Naalu Veli Nilam		
1959	Ulagam Sirikkirathu	Kumar	
1959	Sahodhari	Ravi	

=== 1960s ===
Year	Title	Role	Notes
1960	Mahalakshmi		
1960	Padikkadha Medhai	Sridhar	
1960	Ondrupattal Undu Vazhvu		
1960	Paadhai Theriyudhu Paar		
1961	Arasilankumari	Pulikesi	
1962	Nenjil Or Aalayam	Venu	
1962	Ethaiyum Thangum Ithaiyam		
1962	Padithal Mattum Podhuma	Moorthy	
1962	Azhagu Nila		
1962	Policekaran Magal	Chinnaiah	
1962	Sumaithaangi		
1963	Kadavulai Kanden		
1963	Vanambadi	Mohan	
1963	Mani Osai		
1963	Paar Magaley Paar	Shekar	
1963	Kunkhumam	Das	
1963	Karpagam	Rajangam	
1963	Annai Illam	Shanmugam	
1963	Ninaipadharku Neramillai	Selvam	
1964	Karnan	Arjuna	
1964	Kadhalikka Neramillai	Vasu / Chidambaram	
1964	Nalvaravu		
1964	Nanum Manidhandhaan		
1964	Deiva Thirumagal		
1964	Kalai Kovil	Kannan	
1964	Amma Enge		
1964	Server Sundaram	Raghavan	
1965	Pazhani	Muthu	
1965	Poojaikku Vandha Malar	Ravi / Chandhru	
1965	Vaazhkai Padagu	Gopal	
1965	Panchavarna Kili	Kannan	
1965	Thiruvilaiyadal	Shenbaga Pandiyan	
1965	Thayin Karunai		
1965	Naanal	Inspector Baskaran	
1966	Chitthi	Balu	
1966	Kodimalar	Ramu	
1966	Namma Veettu Lakshmi		
1966	Marakka Mudiyuma?		
1966	Mahakavi Kalidas	King Boja	
1966	Thaaye Unakkaga	Johnson	
1966	Major Chandrakanth	Srikanth	
1967	Manam Oru Kurangu	Murugesa	
1967	Bama Vijayam	Raman	
1967	Nenjirukkum Varai	Siva	
1967	Anubavam Pudhumai		
1967	Deiva Cheyal		
1967	Seetha		
1967	Anubavi Raja Anubavi	Janakiraman	
1967	Thiruvarutchelvar	Apputhi Adigal	
1967	Rajathi		
1967	Muhurtha Naal	Saravana	
1967	Naan	Kumar / Chinna Raja	
1967	Ooty Varai Uravu	Sundaram	
1968	Devi		
1968	Poovum Pottum		
1968	Ther Thiruvizha	Muthu / Ram	
1968	Teacheramma	Shankar	
1968	Kannan En Kadhalan	Sundaram	
1968	Uyira Maanama		
1968	Edhir Neechal	Nair	
1969	Suba Dhinam		
1969	Kaaval Dheivam	Saiyathu Bai	Guest appearance
1969	Kanne Pappa	Bhaskar	
1969	Gurudhakshaneiy		
1969	Nirai Kudam	Sambath	
1969	Thulabharam		
1969	Avare En Deivam		
1969	Sivandha Mann	Anand	

=== 1970s ===
Year	Title	Role	Notes
1970	Penn Deivam	Muthuraman	
1970	Thabalkaran Thangai	Thiyagarajan	
1970	En Annan	Murali	
1970	Veettuku Veedu	Balu	
1970	Maanavan	Ravi	
1970	Raman Ethanai Ramanadi	Muthu	
1970	Navagraham	Siva	
1970	Kannan Varuvan		
1970	Anadhai Anandhan		
1970	Engirundho Vandhaal	Chandran	Guest appearance
1970	Sorgam	Kannan	
1970	Namma Veettu Deivam		
1970	Nilave Nee Satchi		
1971	Iru Thuruvam	Durai	
1971	Pudhiya Vazhkai	Raju	
1971	Thangaikkaaga	Sekhar	
1971	Arunodhayam	Arun	
1971	Uyir		
1971	Avalukendru Or Manam	Gopal	
1971	Veguli Penn	Captain Muthu	
1971	Savaale Samali	Marimuthu	Guest appearance
1971	Irulum Oliyum	Ramu	
1971	Sudarum Sooravaliyum		
1971	Moondru Deivangal	Muthu	
1971	Annai Velankanni	Land Lord	
1971	Aathi Parasakthi		
1971	Punnagai	Rajan	
1971	Oru Thai Makkal	Ravi	
1971	Soodhattam		
1972	Rani Yaar Kuzhanthai	Major Madhu	
1972	Dhikku Theriyadha Kaattil	Vijaya's Husband	
1972	Mr. Sampath	Sampath	
1972	Kurathi Magan		Guest Appearance
1972	Kasethan Kadavulada	Ramu	
1972	Kanimuthu Paappa	Dr. Ravi	
1972	Delhi To Madras	Sekar	
1972	Dharmam Engey	Boopathy	
1972	Deiva Sankalpam		Guest appearance
1972	Kannamma		
1972	Vazhaiyadi Vazhai		
1972	Bathilukku Bathil		
1972	Deivam	Mani	
1972	Itho Enthan Deivam		
1972	Dhakam	Sekhar	
1973	Petha Manam Pithu	Ramu	
1973	Maru Piravi	Elango	
1973	Nalla Mudivu		
1973	Rajaraja Cholan	Prince Vimaladhithan	
1973	Shanmugapriya		
1973	Nyayam Ketkirom		
1973	Ponnunjal	Minor Manickam	
1973	Sontham	Manickam	
1973	Suryagandhi	Mohan	
1973	Thirumalai Deivam	King Tondaimann	
1973	Veettukku Vandha Marumagal		Guest appearance
1973	Deiva Kuzhandhaigal		
1973	Karaikkal Ammaiyar	Paramathathan	
1973	Nathayil Muthu	Madhu	
1973	School Master		Guest appearance
1973	Radha		
1973	Malligai Poo		
1974	Thirumangalyam		
1974	Pathu Madha Bandham		
1974	Dheerga Sumangali	Sundaram	
1974	Vani Rani	Dr. Ravi	
1974	Kadavul Mama		
1974	Roshakkari		
1974	Penn Ondru Kanden		
1974	Anbu Thangai	Ramu	
1974	Engal Kula Dheivam		
1974	Engamma Sapatham	Sundaram	
1974	Thai Pirandhal		
1974	Avalum Penn Thaane	Muthu	
1975	Kasthuri Vijayam		
1975	Anbu Roja		
1975	Piriya Vidai		
1975	Avandhan Manidhan	Chandran	
1975	Ellorum Nallavare		
1975	Mayangukiral Oru Maadhu	Kumar	
1975	Uravu Solla Oruvan	Mohan	
1975	Ezhaikkum Kaalam Varum		
1975	Aan Pillai Singam		
1975	Vaazhnthu Kaattugiren	Ramanathan	
1975	Amudha		
1975	Vaira Nenjam	Shankar	
1975	Oru Kudumbathin Kadhai		
1976	Unmaiye Un Vilai Enna?	Arumainayagam	
1976	Muthana Muthallavo		
1976	Kula Gauravam		
1976	Inspector Manaivi		
1976	Chitra Pournami	Kumar	
1976	Seervarisai		
1976	Nalla Penmani		
1976	Kaalangalil Aval Vasantham	Ravi	
1976	Perum Pugazhum		
1976	Kanavan Manaivi	Shankar	
1976	Vazhvu En Pakkam	Raju	
1977	Thalia Salangaiya		
1977	Punniyam Seithaval		
1977	Punitha Anthoniyar		
1977	Balaparitchai		
1977	Penn Jenmam		
1977	Nee Vazha Vendum		
1977	Murugan Adimai	Thief	
1977	Mazhai Megam		
1977	Deviyin Thirumanam		
1977	Aalukkoru Aasai		
1978	Sri Kanchi Kamakshi	Adishankara	
1978	Per Solla Oru Pillai		
1978	Anna Poorani		
1978	Kaatrinile Varum Geetham	Mohan	
1978	Aval Thantha Uravu		
1978	Achchani		
1978	Vayasu Ponnu		
1979	Neeya?	Ravi	Special appearance
1979	Raja Rajeswari		

=== 1980s ===
Year	Title	Role	Notes
1980	Inaintha Thuruvangal		
1980	Guru	Raghu	
1980	Panam Penn Paasam		Last film; also producer
1982	Pokkiri Raja	Venkatachalam	Posthumous film
