= Major Sundarrajan filmography =

This is the filmography of Major Sundarrajan, an Indian actor and director who worked primarily in Tamil films.

== Filmography ==
=== Tamil films ===
Year	Film	Role	Notes	Ref.
1962	Pattinathar	King Chola		
1964	Server Sundaram	Chakravarthy		
1965	Kuzhandaiyum Deivamum	Ramalingam		
1965	Naanal	Prisoner Arasu		
1965	Neerkumizhi	Dr. Balakrishnan		
1965	Vennira Aadai	Shoba's Father		
1965	Panchavarna Kili	Chokkalingam		
1966	Major Chandrakanth	Major Chandrakanth		
1966	Marakka Mudiyumaa?			
1966	Motor Sundaram Pillai	Gopal's Father		
1966	Thaaye Unakkaga	Antony		
1966	Thenmazhai	Nagalingam		
1967	Anubavi Raja Anubavi	Chithambaram		
1967	Bama Vijayam	Maheswaran		
1967	Aalayam	Ramalingam		
1967	Athey Kangal	Police Officer		
1967	Deiva Cheyal			
1967	Selva Magal	Balaram		
1967	Thangai	Ulaganathan		
1967	Vivasayi	Pannaiyar Duraisamy, Muthaiya's father		
1967	Thanga Thambi			
1968	Andru Kanda Mugam	Selva Nayagam		
1968	Bommalattam	Balraj/Rathnam		
1968	Ethir Neechal	Sabapathy		
1968	En Thambi	Sundara Boopathy		
1968	Lakshmi Kalyanam	Ragunathan		
1968	Muthu Chippi	Prabha's father		
1968	Sathiyam Thavaradhey			
1968	Uyarndha Manithan	Sundaram		
1968	Thamarai Nenjam	Vasudevan		
1968	Kuzhanthaikkaga	Jambu		
1968	Chakkaram			
1969	Akka Thangai	Sundaram / Neruppu Kannaiyan		
1969	Thanga Surangam	I.G. Sundaresh		
1969	Deiva Magan	Dr. Raju		
1969	Gurudhakshanai	Devaki's Father		
1969	Anjal Petti 520	Chidambaram		
1969	Manasatchi			
1969	Nil Gavani Kadhali	Babu		
1969	Nirai Kudam	Madhanagopal		
1969	Thirudan	Inspector Ragunath		
1969	Thunaivan	Maragatham's Father		
1969	Thulabharam	Sathyamoorthy		
1970	Engirundho Vandhaal	Pattavarayan		
1970	Ethiroli	Maanickam		
1970	Jeevanadi			
1970	Paadhukaappu	Vaiyapuri		
1970	Thedi Vandha Mappillai	Pasupathy Rabhagavadhor (alias Solaimalai)		
1970	Penn Deivam	Ponnamma's Husband		
1970	Maanavan	Judge		
1970	Malathi			
1970	Namma Kuzhandaigal			
1970	Navagraham	Somu		
1970	Veettuku Veedu	Kadikalingam		
1971	Aathi Parasakthi	Foreigner		
1971	Iru Thuruvam	I.G. Police Officer		
1971	Annai Velankanni	Sudararajan		
1971	Babu	Vedhachalam		
1971	Meendum Vazhven	Chinna Durai		
1971	Punnagai			
1971	Thanga Gopuram	Sadha Sivam		
1971	Thirumagal	Ranga Rajan		
1972	Appa Tata			
1972	Deiva Sankalpam			
1972	Dheivam	Kanthappan		
1972	Rani Yaar Kuzhantai	Dharmalingam		
1972	Dhikku Theriyadha Kaattil	Williams		
1972	Enna Mudhalaali Sowkiyama			
1972	Gnana Oli	Inspector Lawrence		
1972	Kadhalikka Vanga	Judo		
1972	Mappillai Azhaippu			
1972	Nalla Neram	Velu		
1972	Naan Yen Pirandhen	Mohana Sundaram		
1972	Needhi	Vakel		
1972	Raja	Prasanth		
1972	Shakthi Leelai	Jamadagni		
1972	Vasantha Maligai	Latha's Father		
1972	Dhakam			
1973	Deivamsam	Muthaiya		
1973	Bharatha Vilas	Baldev Singh		
1973	Engal Thanga Raja	Bai		
1973	Gauravam	Mohandass		
1973	Vakkuruthi	Nagarajan		
1973	Manidharil Manikkam	Police Officer		
1973	Komatha En Kulamatha	Village President		
1973	Suryagandhi	Eagambaram		
1973	Vijaya			
1973	Thedi Vandha Lakshmi	C.I.D. Chandrasekhar / Raja Pandiyan		
1974	Anbai Thedi	Rajasekar		
1974	Avalukku Nigar Avale			
1974	En Magan	Jagannath		
1974	Engamma Sapatham			
1974	Raja Nagam			
1974	Thanga Pathakkam	Mayandi		
1974	Thaai	Duraisamy/Samidurai		
1974	Thirumangalyam			
1974	Anbu Thangai			
1975	Ellorum Nallavare	Dharmalinga		
1975	Anbe Aaruyire	Sattanathan		
1975	Andharangam	Thangadurai		
1975	Apoorva Raagangal	Mahendran		
1975	Cinema Paithiyam	Sivalingam		
1975	Avandhan Manidhan	Murugan		
1975	Dr. Siva			
1975	Paattum Bharathamum	Thiyagarajan		
1975	Thiruvarul			
1975	Yarukkum Vetkam Illai			
1976	Bhadrakali	Gayathri's father		
1976	Chitra Pournami	Vaithiyar		
1976	Dasavatharam	King Dasarathan		
1976	Jai Jagat Janani			
1976	Kumbai Thedi			
1976	Gruhapravesam	Uma's Father		
1976	Inspector Pondatti			
1976	Manasara Vazhthungalen			
1976	Mogam Muppadhu Varusham			
1976	Nalla Penmani			
1976	Nee Indri Naan Illai			
1976	Rojavin Raja	Natarajan		
1976	Ore Thanthai			
1976	Oru Kodiyil Iru Malargal			
1976	Palootti Valartha Kili			
1976	Payanam			
1976	Perum Pukazhum			
1976	Sandhadhi			
1976	Sathyam			
1976	Thayilla Kuzhandai			
1976	Unakkaga Naan			
1976	Unarchigal	Doctor		
1976	Uthaman	Chief Doctor		
1976	Vanga Sambandhi Vanga			
1976	Vayilla Poochi			
1977	Dheepam			
1977	Avan Oru Sarithiram			
1977	Durga Devi			
1977	Edharkum Thuninthavan			
1977	Nadu Iravil	Dhayanandham		
1977	Gasslight Mangamma			
1977	Madhura Geetham			
1977	Murugan Adimai			
1977	Raasi Nalla Raasi			
1977	Saindhadamma Saindhadu			
1977	Sonthamadi Nee Enakku			
1977	Sri Krishna Leela	Vasudevar		
1977	Swargam Naragam			
1977	Thaliya Salangaiya			
1977	Thanikkudithanam			
1977	Annan Oru Koyil			
1977	Thoondil Meen			
1978	Thyagam			
1978	Justice Gopinath			
1978	Makkal Kural			
1978	Manitharil Ithanai Nirangala			
1978	Paruva Mazhai			
1978	Pilot Premnath			
1978	Priya			
1978	Raadhaiketha Kannan			
1978	Sakka Podu Podu Raja			
1978	Shri Kanchi Kamakshi	Meenakshimyndan		
1978	Thai Meedtu Sathiyam			
1979	Dharma Yuddham			
1979	Kalyanaraman	Kalyanam's Estate Manager		
1979	Kandhar Alangaram			
1979	Kavari Maan			
1979	Mahalakshmi			
1979	Manthoppu Kiliye			
1979	Mudal Iravu			
1979	Naan Vazhavaippen			
1979	Nallathoru Kudumbam			
1979	Annai Oru Aalayam			
1979	Nee Sirithal Naan Sirippen			
1979	Neechal Kulam			
1979	Needhikkumun Neeya Naana			
1979	Neela Malargal			
1979	Pagalil Oru Iravu			
1979	Pattakathi Bhairavan			
1979	Thaayillamal Naan Illai			
1979	Thirisoolam			
1979	Thisai Maariya Paravaigal			
1979	Veettukku Veedu Vasappadi			
1979	Velum Mayilum Thunai	Prohit		
1979	Vetrukku Oruvan			
1980	Billa			
1980	Bombay Mail 109			
1980	Dharma Raja			
1980	Ellam Un Kairasi	Smuggler		
1980	Guru			
1980	Inaindha Thuruvangal			
1980	Jamboo			
1980	Kaali			
1980	Kathal Kiligal			
1980	Meenakshi			
1980	Naan Potta Saval			
1980	Nandri Karangal			
1980	Ore Mutham			
1980	Raman Parasuraman			
1980	Ratha Paasam			
1980	Rishi Moolam			
1980	Sujatha			
1980	Ullasa Paravaigal	Madhanagopal		
1980	Vedanai Thediya Maan			
1980	Vishwaroopam	Rajan		
1980	Yamanukku Yaman			
1981	Garjanai			
1981	Kalthoon			
1981	Keezh Vaanam Sivakkum	Guest		
1981	Maadi Veettu Ezhai			
1981	Maharantham			
1981	Mohana Punnagai			
1981	Nallathu Nadanthe Theerum			
1981	Thee			
1982	Magane Magane			
1982	Nayakarin Magal			
1982	Neethi Devan Mayakkam			
1982	Sangili	Sivaraj		
1982	Thaai Mookaambikai			
1982	Thyagi			
1983	Indru Nee Naalai Naan			
1983	Sandhippu			
1983	Sashti Viratham			
1983	Thai Veedu	Rajasekaran		
1983	Villiyanur Matha			
1984	Anbe Odivaa			
1984	Garjanai			
1984	Iru Medhaigal			
1984	Pillayar			
1984	Simma Soppanam			
1984	Unga Veettu Pillai			
1985	Andavan Sothu			
1985	Naan Sigappu Manithan			
1985	Nermai	Guest		
1985	Needhiyin Nizhal			
1985	Pournami Alaigal			
1985	Neethiyin Marupakkam			
1985	Thandanai			
1985	Uyarndha Ullam			
1985	Aduthathu Albert			
1986	Dharmam			
1986	Oru Iniya Udhayam			
1987	Krishnan Vandhan			
1988	En Thamizh En Makkal			
1989	Sattathin Thirappu Vizhaa			
1989	Poruthadhu Podhum			
1990	Kavalukku Kettikaran	Police Trainer		
1990	Pachaikodi			
1991	Rudhra			
1991	Vasanthakala Paravai			
1992	Chinna Chittu			
1992	Pandithurai			
1992	Neenga Nalla Irukkanum			
1992	Sevakan			
1992	Urimai Oonjaladugiradhu			
1993	Prathap			
1993	Pursha Lakshhanam			
1994	Jai Hind			
1994	Namma Annachi			
1995	Rajamuthirai			
1995	Thaikulame Thaikulame			
1995	Villadhi Villain			
1996	Pudhu Nilavu			
1997	Mannava			
1997	Samrat			
1997	Iruvar	Police Officer		
1998	Marumalarchi			
1998	Velai			
1999	Kallazhagar			
2000	Athey Manithan			
2002	Game			

=== Malayalam films ===
Year	Film	Role
1973	Jesus	Pontius Pilate
1978	Gaandharvam	
1992	Soorya Gayathri	
1996	Mahathma	Justice Varma

=== Telugu film ===
Year	Film	Role
1986	Swathi Muthyam	Rao

=== As director ===
Year	Film	Ref.
1985	Andha Oru Nimidam	
1984	Amma Irukka	
1983	Indru Nee Nalai Naan	
1982	Nenjangal	
1982	Oorum Uravum	
1981	Kalthoon	

=== Television ===
Year	Serial Name	Character	Channel
2001-2002	Kelunga Mamiyare Neengalum Marumagal Than		Sun TV

=== As dubbing artist ===
Year	Film	Language	Actor	Character
1993	Jurassic Park	Tamil	Richard Attenburough	John Heymand
