= List of Tamil films of 1974 =

Post-amendment to the Tamil Nadu Entertainments Tax Act 1939 on 1 April 1958, Gross jumped to 140 per cent of Net. Commercial Taxes Department disclosed ₹15.93 crore in entertainment tax revenue for the year.

The following is a list of films produced in the Tamil film industry in India in 1974, in alphabetical order.

== 1974 ==
Title	Director	Production	Music	Cast
Akkarai Pachai	N. Venkatesh	Yoga Chithra Productions	M. S. Viswanathan	Jaishankar, Ravichandran, Nagesh, Lakshmi, Jayachitra, Savitri, Rajeshri
Anbai Thedi	V. Srinivasan	Muktha Films	M. S. Viswanathan	Sivaji Ganesan, Jayalalitha, Major Sundarrajan, C. R. Vijayakumari, Shubha, Cho, Manorama
Anbu Thangai	S. P. Muthuraman	Gowri Art Enterprises	K. V. Mahadevan	R. Muthuraman, Jayalalitha, Jaya, Srikanth, K. A. Thangavelu
Appa Amma	Maa. Raa.	K. S. Sithambaram; Simham Productions	Shyam	Gemini Ganesan, Padmini, Ravichandran, Sheela
Athaiya Mamiya	Gopu	Garuda Films	M. S. Viswanathan	Jaishankar, Ushanandini, Nagesh, Thengai Srinivasan, Manorama, Srikanth, M. N. Rajam, M. Bhanumathi, Vennira Aadai Moorthy, Sachu
Aval Oru Thodar Kathai	K. Balachander	Arul Films	M. S. Viswanathan	Sujatha, Kamal Haasan, Vijayakumar, Fatafat Jayalaxmi, Jai Ganesh, M. G. Soman, Sripriya
Avalukku Nigar Avale	Madurai Thirumanam	Sri Ravipriya Films	V. Kumar	Ravichandran, Vennira Aadai Nirmala, Kalyan Kumar, Thengai Srinivasan, Pushpalatha, Manorama, V. K. Ramasamy, Major Sundarrajan, Shanmugasundaram
Avalum Penn Thaane	Durai	Sri Panduranga Productions	V. Kumar	R. Muthuraman, Sumithra, Thengai Srinivasan, Manorama, Rama Prabha
Devi Sri Karumari Amman	Vietnam Veedu Sundaram	Anu Combines	Shankar–Ganesh	K. R. Vijaya, Gemini Ganesan, Kumari Padmini, Major Sundarrajan, S. Varalakshmi, Pushpalatha, K. A. Thangavelu, Cho, Suruli Rajan, Manorama, Vijayakumar, Sasikumar, Sriranjani Jr., Lalitha Sri
Dheerga Sumangali	A. C. Tirulokchandar	Visalakshi Combines	M. S. Viswanathan	K. R. Vijaya, R. Muthuraman, Major Sundarrajan, Pushpalatha, Sivakumar, Jayasudha, Suruli Rajan, Y. G. Mahendra
Doctoramma	K. Sornam	Meenakshi Art Productions	Shankar–Ganesh	A. V. M. Rajan, Manjula, Thengai Srinivasan, Asogan, M. N. Rajam, Murthi
Dikkatra Parvathi	Singeetam Srinivasa Rao	Navatharang Productions	Chitti Babu	Lakshmi, Srikanth, Y. G. Mahendran
En Magan	C. V. Rajendran	Sujatha Cine Arts	M. S. Viswanathan	Sivaji Ganesan, Manjula, K. Balaji, Roja Ramani, V. K. Ramasamy, Manorama
Engal Kula Dheivam	P. R. Somu	A. V. R. Combines	M. S. Viswanathan	R. Muthuraman, K. R. Vijaya, Jayachitra, Thengai Srinivasan, Manorama, Suruli Rajan, Baby Sridevi
Engamma Sapatham	S. P. Muthuraman	Vijayabaskar Films	Vijaya Bhaskar	R. Muthuraman, Sivakumar, Jayachitra, Vidhubala, Suruli Rajan, Manorama
Gumasthavin Magal	A. P. Nagarajan	C. N. V.Movies	Kunnakudi Vaidyanathan	Sivakumar, Kamal Haasan, Aarathi, Usha Shakeela, Nagesh, Pandari Bai
Idhayam Parkiradhu	A. Jagannathan	Udhaya Arts	T. R. Pappa, M.S.Vsiwanathan	Jaishankar, Srividya, Jayachitra, Jayakumari, Srikanth
Kadavul Mama	K. Singamuthu	Padmini Pictures	T. G. Lingappa	R. Muthuraman, Jayachitra, Thengai Srinivasan, Srikanth, Kumari Padmini, Asogan
Kai Niraya Kaasu	A. B. Raj	Arunodaya Films	Shankar–Ganesh	Nagesh, Prameela, Thengai Srinivasan, A. Sakunthala, Srikanth, M. R. R. Vasu, Sachu, L. Kanchana
Kaliyuga Kannan	Krishnan–Panju	Ajantha Enterprises	V. Kumar	Jaishankar, Sowcar Janaki, Jayachitra, Thengai Srinivasan, Manorama, V. K. Ramasamy, Asogan
Kalyanamam Kalyanam	K. Krishnamurthy	Geetha Chithra Productions	Vijaya Bhaskar	Jaishankar, Jayachitra, Cho, Sukumari, Srikanth, Thengai Srinivasan, Jayakumari, Pushpamala
Kanmani Raja	Devaraj–Mohan	Muthuvel Movies	M. S. Viswanathan	Sivakumar, Lakshmi, M. N. Rajam, Thengai Srinivasan, Manorama, Kumari Padmini
Magalukkaga	M. Krishnan	Vijaya Bhanu Movies	M. S. Viswanathan	A. V. M. Rajan, Vijaya Kumari, Jaya, Ravichandran, M. R. R. Vasu, Asogan, Manorama, Ramadas
Maanikka Thottil	P. Madhavan	Karpagam Productions	M. S. Viswanathan	Gemini Ganesan, K. R. Vijaya, Shubha, Nagesh, Vijayakumar, Jayakumari, Vijaya Chandrika
Murugan Kaattiya Vazhi	P. Madhavan	Arun Prasad Movies	G. K. Venkatesh	A. V. M. Rajan, Nagesh, Srikanth, Vijayakumar, Vidhubala, Sripriya, Vijaya Chandrika, Pakoda Kadhar
Naan Avanillai	K. Balachander	Shri Narayani Films	M. S. Viswanathan	Gemini Ganesan, Kamal Haasan, Lakshmi, Jayabharathi, Jayasudha, Leelavathi
Netru Indru Naalai	P. Neelakantan	Amalraj Films	M. S. Viswanathan	M. G. Ramachandran, Manjula, Latha, Rajasree, Thengai Srinivasan, Isari Velan, Rama Prabha, Sukumari
Onne Onnu Kanne Kannu	Ra. Sankaran	Sudharshan Enterprises	V. Kumar	Sivakumar, Jayachitra, Cho, Manorama, Srikanth, Surulirajan, Vijaya Chandrika
Ore Satchi	K. Vijayan	Devi Creations	Shankar–Ganesh	A. V. M. Rajan, P. R. Varalakshmi, Major Sundarrajan, M. N. Rajam, Cho, Manorama
Paadha Poojai	A. Bhimsingh	Kasi Ram Pictures	Jaya Vijaya	Sivakumar, Jayachitra, Jaya, V. S. Raghavan, V. K. Ramasamy, Vennira Aadai Moorthy, Manorama, Sukumari
Panathukkaga	M. S. Senthil	Vetrivel Productions	M. S. Viswanathan	Sivakumar, Jayachitra, Shashikumar, Thengai Srinivasan, A. Sakunthala, Kamal Haasan, Master Sridhar, Sripriya
Pandhattam	Ma. Lakshmanan	S. K. Combines	Shankar–Ganesh	Jaishankar, Jayasudha, Shashikumar, Jayakumari, M. R. R. Vasu, Manorama, Suruli Rajan
Paruva Kaalam	Jos A. N. Fernando	Jupiter Art Movies	G. Devarajan	Prameela, Roja Ramani, Srikanth, Kamal Haasan, Nagesh, Sachu
Pathu Madha Bandham	Krishnan–Panju	Sri Navaneetha Films	Shankar–Ganesh	P. Bhanumathi, B. Saroja Devi, A. V. M. Rajan, R. Muthuraman, Ravichandran, Vennira Aadai Nirmala, Rajasree, Thengai Srinivasan, Manorama, M. N. Rajam
Penn Ondru Kanden	Gopu	Sangeetha Films	M. S. Viswanathan	R. Muthuraman, Prameela, Nagesh, M. R. R. Vasu, Vennira Aadai Moorthy, M. Bhanumathi
Pillai Selvam	V. Ramachandra Rao	Senthil Kumar Productions	Sakthi Kumar	Jaishankar, S. V. Ranga Rao, Devika, 'Master' Ramu, Kumari Padmini, Nagesh, Cho, Manorama, Sukumari
Prayachittham	R. Sundaram	Modern Theatres	M. Sanjay	Jaishankar, Shashi Kumar, Lakshmi, Jayasudha, Thengai Srinivasan, Manorama
Pudhiya Manidhan	Thirumalai–Mahalingam	Nahata Productions	Shankar–Ganesh	Jaishankar, Jayasudha
Raja Nagam	N. S. Maniam	Jega Jothi Pictures	V. Kumar	Srikanth, Manjula, Shubha, Major Sundarrajan
Roshakkari	Madurai Thirumaran	Jeyam Combines	M. S. Viswanathan	R. Muthuraman, K. R. Vijaya, Ravichandran, Kumari Padmini, A. Sakunthala, Cho, S. V. Subbaiah
Samarpanam	Thillai Raghavan	Thyagam Pictures	N. S. Thiyagarajan	Vijayakumar, Vidhubala, Suruli Rajan, Sachu
Samayalkaran	Thirumalai–Mahalingam	Marina Movies	M. S. Viswanathan	M. K. Muthu, Vennira Aadai Nirmala, M. R. Radha, Thengai Srinivasan, M. Bhanumathi
Sirithu Vazha Vendum	S. S. Balan	Udhayam Productions	M. S. Viswanathan	M. G. Ramachandran, Latha, Thengai Srinivasan
Sisupalan	K. K. Sampathkumar	Sri Vijaya Cine Arts	Kunnakudi Vaidyanathan	R. S. Manohar, Vennira Aadai Nirmala, Sivakumar, Srividya
Sivagamiyin Selvan	C. V. Rajendran	Jayanthi Films	M. S. Viswanathan	Sivaji Ganesan, Vanisri, Latha, A. V. M. Rajan, Cho
Sorgathil Thirumanam	T. R. Ramanna	Anjaneya Combines	Shankar–Ganesh	Ravichandran, Sowcar Janaki Latha, Nagesh
Swathi Nakshathram	K. S. Gopalakrishnan	Ashok Pictures	V. Kumar	P. Bhanumathi, Ravikumar, R. S. Manohar, Udaya Chandrika, P. R. Varalakshmi
Thaai	D. Yoganand	Babu Movies	M. S. Viswanathan	Sivaji Ganesan, Jayalalitha, S. Varalakshmi, Major Sundarrajan, M. R. R. Vasu, Manorama
Thaai Pasam	B. V. Srinivasan	Suchithra Films	V. Kumar	Sivakumar, Prameela, K. A. Thangavelu, Cho, Thengai Srinivasan, Vijaya Chandrika
Thaai Pirandhal	A. K. Subramaniam	Jeeva Jothi Films	M. S. Viswanathan	P. Bhanumathi, R. Muthuraman, Sharada, A. Sakunthala, Thengai Srinivasan, Suruli Rajan, Sachu
Thangappathakkam	P. Madhavan	Sivaji Productions	M. S. Viswanathan	Sivaji Ganesan, K. R. Vijaya, Srikanth, Prameela, Major Sundarrajan, Cho, Manorama, Pushpamala, Suruli Rajan
Thanga Valayal	M. A. V. Rajendran	Selam Movies	K. V. Mahadevan	Jaishankar, K. R. Vijaya, V. Meera Devi, K. A. Thangavelu, Manorama
Thirudi	Madurai Thirumaran	M. S. Kasi Viswanathan	M. S. Viswanathan	Jaishankar, K. R. Vijaya, V. K. Ramasamy, Manorama
Thirumangalyam	A. Vincent	Vijaya & Suresh Combines	M. S. Viswanathan	R. Muthuraman, Jayalalitha, Sivakumar, Lakshmi, Nagesh, Srikanth, Sukumari, Sachu
Tiger Thaathachari	V. T. Arasu	Senthoor Films	Soolamangalam Sisters	Major Sundarrajan, Sivakumar, M. Bhanumathi, Shashi Kumar, Sukumari, P. R. Varalakshmi
Ungal Viruppam	K. Krishnamurthy	Sri Chitra Mahal Productions	Vijaya Bhaskar	Jaishankar, Jayachitra, Thengai Srinivasan, Manorama, V. Gopalakrishnan
Unnaithan Thambi	R. Vittal	Geetha Chitra Productions	Vijaya Bhaskar	Jaishankar, Jayachitra, Manorama, Thengai Srinivasan, Srikanth,
Urimaikural	C. V. Sridhar	Chitrayuga Productions	M. S. Viswanathan	M. G. Ramachandran, Latha, Anjali Devi, Nagesh, Thengai Srinivasan, Pushpalatha, Sachu
Vairam	T. R. Ramanna	Vijaya & Suri Combines	T. R. Pappa	Jaishankar, Jayalalitha, S. A. Ashokan, M. R. R. Vasu, Thengai Srinivasan, Sachu
Vani Rani	Tapi Chanakya; C. V. Rajendran	Vijaya Productions	K. V. Mahadevan	Sivaji Ganesan, Vanisri, R. Muthuraman, K. A. Thangavelu
Vellikizhamai Viratham	R. Thyagarajan	Dhandayudhapani Films	Shankar–Ganesh	Sivakumar, Jayachitra, Jayasudha, Nagesh, Srikanth, Shashi Kumar.
