= Kandhar Alangaram =

- Directed by: Vietnam Veedu Sundaram
- Written by: Kirupanandha Variyar
- Produced by: V. R. Cine Creations
- Starring: Thengai Srinivasan; Sujatha; M. R. Radha
- Music by: Kunnakudi Vaidyanathan
- Production company: V. R. Cine Creations
- Release date: 14 January 1979
- Running time: 147 minutes
- Country: India
- Language: Tamil

Kandhar Alangaram is a 1979 Indian Tamil-language devotional drama film directed by Vietnam Veedu Sundaram. The film's story was written by the prominent spiritual scholar Kirupanandha Variyar, with music composed by the violin maestro Kunnakudi Vaidyanathan. The film was produced by V. R. Cine Creations and was released on 14 January 1979, coinciding with the Pongal festival.

The film features an ensemble cast including M. R. Radha, Thengai Srinivasan, and Sujatha in the leading roles. The cinematic print of the film had a theatrical reel length of 4,644 metres (15,236 ft).

== Plot ==
The film is presented as a devotional anthology centered around the Hindu deity Lord Murugan. The narrative weaves together the lives of various individuals—ranging from staunch skeptics and non-believers to deeply pious devotees—who are all facing severe personal, financial, and moral crises. Through divine intervention and profound miracles, their unwavering faith is tested and ultimately rewarded. The intertwined stories serve to transform the cynics and validate the devotion of the righteous.

== Cast ==
- M. R. Radha as a non-believer / skeptic
- Sujatha as an absolute, devout woman facing hardship
- Thengai Srinivasan as a troubled devotee
- Major Sundarrajan as a conservative family patriarch
- Srividya as a pious, long-suffering mother
- Srikanth as a young professional facing moral crises
- Devika as a senior maternal figure
- V. K. Ramasamy as a village elder
- Pushpalatha as a supportive village wife
- K. A. Thangavelu as a comic devotee
- Sachu as a comedic female lead
- Delhi Ganesh as an earnest middle-class devotee
- Gandhimathi as an expressive, loud neighborhood woman
- Isari Velan as a comic villager
- V. S. Raghavan as a spiritual mentor
- M. R. R. Vasu as an aggressive local detractor
- K. Kannan as an antagonist
- Ennathe Kannaiah as a villager
- Jayadevi as a young village woman
- P. R. Varalakshmi as a devotee's wife
- S. A. Kannan as a temple administrator
- Vijayababu as a devotee
- Junior Balaiah as a young companion
- Kunnakudi Vaidyanathan as Himself (Cameo appearance)

== Soundtrack ==
The soundtrack and background score were composed by Kunnakudi Vaidyanathan. The lyrics were penned by Kannadasan, Ulundurpettai Shanmugam, Trichy Bharathan, Nellai Arulmani, and Pulavar Maari.

No.	Title	Lyrics	Singer(s)	Length
1.	"Kanthanukku Alangaram"	Kannadasan	Sulamangalam Sisters	4:30
2.	"Kundrakudi Kumaraiya"	Kannadasan	T. M. Soundararajan	4:30
3.	"Muthumani Kumaran"	Trichy Bharathan	Mallika, Chandrika	4:00
4.	"Santhanam Manakkuthu"	Kannadasan	T. M. Soundararajan	4:32
5.	"Senthoor Nayagan Thirukolam"	Kannadasan	Vani Jairam	4:21
6.	"Uyire Unarve"	Kannadasan	T. M. Soundararajan	4:05
7.	"Vellum Peyarthane Velavan"	Ulundurpettai Shanmugam	S. Janaki	9:20
Total length:				35:18
