= Vani Rani =

Vani Rani may refer to

- Vani Rani (film), 1974 Tamil film
- Vani Rani (TV series), Tamil soap opera
