= 1974 in film =

The year 1974 in film involved some significant events. Important films released this year included The Godfather Part II, Blazing Saddles, The Towering Inferno, Chinatown, Earthquake, and Young Frankenstein. Columbia Pictures and Metro-Goldwyn-Mayer (MGM) celebrated their 50th anniversaries.

== Highest-grossing films (U.S.) ==
The top ten 1974 released films by box office gross in North America are as follows:

Highest-grossing films of 1974
Rank	Title	Distributor(s)	Domestic rentals
1	The Towering Inferno	20th Century Fox / Warner Bros.	$50,000,000
2	Blazing Saddles	Warner Bros.	$45,200,000
3	Young Frankenstein	20th Century Fox	$38,800,000
4	Earthquake	Universal	$36,300,000
5	The Trial of Billy Jack	Warner Bros.	$31,100,000
6	The Godfather Part II	Paramount	$30,700,000
7	Airport 1975	Universal	$25,800,000
8	The Longest Yard	Paramount	$23,000,000
9	Death Wish	Paramount	$22,000,000
10	The Life and Times of Grizzly Adams	Sunn Classic	$21,895,000

== Events ==
- February 7 – Blazing Saddles is released in the United States.
- May 28 - Joseph E. Levine, the founder of Embassy Pictures, resigns as president.
- June 20 – Chinatown, directed by Roman Polanski and featured Jack Nicholson, Faye Dunaway, and John Huston, is released to worldwide critical acclaim.
- September 23 – Barry Diller announced as chairman and chief executive office of Paramount Pictures.
- November 1 – Technicolor ceases its legendary dye-transfer printing process.
- November 8 – Frank Yablans announces his resignation as president of Paramount Pictures with effect from January 5, 1975.
- Metro-Goldwyn-Mayer celebrated its fiftieth anniversary with big fanfare, including That's Entertainment!, a retrospective documentary celebrating its prestigious musicals (e.g. The Wizard of Oz, Singin' in the Rain, Meet Me in St. Louis, Gigi, An American in Paris, Seven Brides for Seven Brothers).
- October–December – Three "disaster films" are released in three consecutive months: Airport 1975, Earthquake, and The Towering Inferno respectively. All were box office successes.
- December 30 – Gordon Stulberg resigns as president of 20th Century Fox.
- Kevin Costner made his film debut in Sizzle Beach, U.S.A., although the film was not released until 1986.

== Awards ==
Category/Organization	32nd Golden Globe Awards January 25, 1975		28th BAFTA Awards February 18, 1975	47th Academy Awards April 8, 1975
Category/Organization	Drama	Comedy or Musical	28th BAFTA Awards February 18, 1975	47th Academy Awards April 8, 1975
Best Film	Chinatown	The Longest Yard	Lacombe, Lucien	The Godfather Part II
Best Director	Roman Polanski; Chinatown			Francis Ford Coppola; The Godfather Part II
Best Actor	Jack Nicholson; Chinatown	Art Carney; Harry and Tonto	Jack Nicholson; The Last Detail / Chinatown	Art Carney; Harry and Tonto
Best Actress	Gena Rowlands; A Woman Under the Influence	Raquel Welch; The Three Musketeers	Joanne Woodward; Summer Wishes, Winter Dreams	Ellen Burstyn; Alice Doesn't Live Here Anymore
Best Supporting Actor	Fred Astaire; The Towering Inferno		John Gielgud; Murder on the Orient Express	Robert De Niro; The Godfather Part II
Best Supporting Actress	Karen Black; The Great Gatsby		Ingrid Bergman; Murder on the Orient Express	
Best Screenplay, Adapted	Chinatown; Robert Towne		Chinatown / The Last Detail; Robert Towne	The Godfather Part II; Francis Ford Coppola and Mario Puzo
Best Screenplay, Original	Chinatown; Robert Towne		Chinatown / The Last Detail; Robert Towne	Chinatown; Robert Towne
Best Original Score	Alan Jay Lerner and Frederick Loewe; The Little Prince		Richard Rodney Bennett; Murder on the Orient Express	Nino Rota and Carmine Coppola; The Godfather Part II; Nelson Riddle; The Great Gatsby
Best Original Song	"I Feel Love"; Benji		N/A	"We May Never Love Like This Again"; The Towering Inferno
Best Foreign Language Film	Scenes from a Marriage		N/A	Amarcord
Best Documentary	Animals Are Beautiful People		Cree Hunters of Mistassini	Hearts and Minds

Palme d'Or (Cannes Film Festival):

The Conversation, directed by Francis Ford Coppola, United States

Golden Bear (Berlin Film Festival):

The Apprenticeship of Duddy Kravitz, directed by Ted Kotcheff, Canada

== 1974 films ==
=== By country/region ===
- List of American films of 1974
- List of Argentine films of 1974
- List of Australian films of 1974
- List of Bangladeshi films of 1974
- List of British films of 1974
- List of Canadian films of 1974
- List of French films of 1974
- List of Hong Kong films of 1974
- List of Indian films of 1974
  - List of Hindi films of 1974
  - List of Kannada films of 1974
  - List of Malayalam films of 1974
  - List of Marathi films of 1974
  - List of Tamil films of 1974
  - List of Telugu films of 1974
- List of Japanese films of 1974
- List of Mexican films of 1974
- List of Pakistani films of 1974
- List of South Korean films of 1974
- List of Soviet films of 1974
- List of Spanish films of 1974

=== By genre/medium ===
- List of action films of 1974
- List of animated feature films of 1974
- List of avant-garde films of 1974
- List of comedy films of 1974
- List of drama films of 1974
- List of horror films of 1974
- List of science fiction films of 1974
- List of thriller films of 1974
- List of western films of 1974

== Births ==
- January 1 – Jennifer Podemski, Canadian actress
- January 5
  - Daisy Bates, English actress
  - Jessica Chaffin, American actress, comedian and writer
- January 9 - Omari Hardwick, American actor
- January 10
  - Jemaine Clement, New Zealand actor, musician, comedian, singer, director and writer
  - Kelly Marcel, English screenwriter, director and former actress
  - Mehdi Nebbou, French actor
  - Hrithik Roshan, Indian actor
- January 14 - Kevin Durand, Canadian actor
- January 16 - Johnny Trí Nguyễn, Vietnamese–American actor
- January 18 - Maulik Pancholy, American actor
- January 19 - Natassia Malthe, Norwegian actress and model
- January 21 - Vincent Laresca, American actor
- January 24 – Ed Helms, American actor and comedian
- January 28
  - Ty Olsson, Canadian actor
  - Melody Perkins, American actress
- January 30
  - Christian Bale, English actor
  - Olivia Colman, English actress
- January 31 - Billy MacLellan, Canadian actor
- February 2 - Oz Perkins, American actor, screenwriter and director
- February 4 – Urmila Matondkar, Indian actress
- February 5 - Tofiga Fepulea'i, New Zealand actor and comedian
- February 8
  - Seth Green, American actor, voice artist, comedian, producer, writer and director
  - Susan May Pratt, American actress
- February 9
  - Erra Fazira, Malaysian actress
  - Amber Valletta, American model and actress
- February 10
  - Elizabeth Banks, American actress, director, writer and producer
  - María Botto, Argentine-Spanish actress
  - Tanoai Reed, American stuntman and actor
- February 11 - Isaiah Mustafa, American actor
- February 12 - Lisa Brenner, American actress
- February 15
  - Miranda July (née Grossinger), American filmmaker, performance artist and fiction writer
  - Gina Lynn, American former pornographic actress
- February 16 – Mahershala Ali, American actor and rapper
- February 17
  - David Lipper, Canadian actor
  - Jerry O'Connell, American actor
- February 18 – Nadine Labaki, Lebanese actress, director and activist
- February 25 – Divya Bharti, Indian actress (d. 1993)
- March 5
  - Kevin Connolly, American actor and director
  - Matt Lucas, English actor, comedian, writer and television presenter
  - Eva Mendes, American actress
- March 7
  - Jenna Fischer, American actress
  - Tobias Menzies, English actor
- March 8
  - Cesar Velasco Broca, Spanish actor and cult filmmaker
  - Danny Corkill, American former child actor
  - Fardeen Khan, Indian actor
  - Sebastián Lelio, Chilean director and writer (d. 2026)
- March 14 - Etan Cohen, Israeli-American screenwriter and director
- March 15 - Renoly Santiago, Puerto Rican actor, singer and writer
- March 21
  - Rhys Darby, New Zealand actor, comedian and voice actor
  - Joseph Mawle, English actor
- March 23 - Randall Park, American actor, comedian and writer
- March 24 – Alyson Hannigan, American actress
- March 25 - Laz Alonso, American actor
- March 31
  - Adrian Holmes, Canadian actor
  - Victoria Smurfit, Irish actress
- April 2 - Harold Hunter, American professional skateboarder and actor (d. 2006)
- April 10 - Omar Metwally, American actor
- April 11 - David Banner, American rapper and actor
- April 12 - Marley Shelton, American actress
- April 15
  - Fay Masterson, English actress
  - Danny Pino, American actor
- April 16 - Valarie Rae Miller, American actress and television host
- April 18 - Edgar Wright, English filmmaker
- April 21
  - John Hasler, English actor and voice actor
  - Tony Kgoroge, South African actor
- April 23 - Barry Watson, American actor
- April 24 – Jennifer Paz, Filipino actress
- April 26 – Ivana Miličević, American actress
- April 28 – Penélope Cruz, Spanish actress
- May 2 - Matt Berry, English actor, voice actor, comedian, writer and musician
- May 3 - Joseph Kosinski, American filmmaker
- May 7 – Breckin Meyer, American actor, voice actor, writer and producer
- May 10 - Craig Hall, New Zealand actor
- May 11 – Benoît Magimel, French actor
- May 14 - Carla Jimenez, American actress
- May 15 – Russell Hornsby, American actor
- May 21
  - Fairuza Balk, American actress
  - Juliet Cowan, Northern Irish actress
  - Eduardo Verástegui, Mexican actor and producer
- May 22 – Sean Gunn, American actor
- May 23 - Jewel, American singer-songwriter and actress
- May 24 - Dash Mihok, American actor and director
- May 25 - Maria Fernanda Cândido, Brazilian actress and television presenter
- May 28 - Romain Duris, French actor
- June 2 - Leah Cairns, Canadian actress
- June 6 - Danny Strong, American actor, writer, director and producer
- June 11 - Lenny Jacobson, American actor
- June 12
  - Jared Bush, American screenwriter, producer and director
  - Jason Mewes, American actor, comedian, film producer and podcaster
- June 13 - Brande Roderick, American model and actress
- June 16 - Joseph May, British-born Canadian-American actor
- June 20 – Lenin M. Sivam, Sri Lankan-Canadian director, producer, and screenwriter
- June 23 – Joel Edgerton, Australian actor
- June 25
  - Jeff Cohen, American former child actor
  - Karisma Kapoor, Indian actress
- June 28 - Kirsty Mitchell, Scottish actress
- July 1 - Jonathan Roumie, American actor
- July 3 - Corey Reynolds, American actor
- July 4 - Mick Wingert, American voice actor
- July 8 – Tami Erin, American actress
- July 10 - Imelda May, Irish actress and singer
- July 14
  - David Mitchell, British comedian, actor and writer
  - Maxine Peake, English actress
- July 16 - Robinne Lee, American actress
- July 20 - Simon Rex, American actor, rapper and comedian
- July 22
  - Donald Faison, American actor, comedian and voice actor
  - Franka Potente, German actress
  - Johnny Strong, American actor, musician and singer-songwriter
- July 23 - Stephanie March, American actress
- July 27
  - Amy Hathaway, American former actress
  - Takehiro Hira, Japanese actor
- July 28 - Hannah Waddingham, English actress, singer and television presenter
- July 29 - Josh Radnor, American actor and filmmaker
- July 30 – Hilary Swank, American actress
- July 31
  - Emilia Fox, English actress and presenter
  - Asher Keddie, Australian actress
- August 2 - Angie Cepeda, Colombian actress
- August 5 – Kajol, Indian actress
- August 7 – Michael Shannon, American actor
- August 8 - Enzo Cilenti, English actor
- August 10 - Craig Kirkwood, American former actor
- August 11 - Chris Messina, American actor, director, writer and producer
- August 14 - Tomer Sisley, Israeli-French actor and comedian
- August 15 – Natasha Henstridge, Canadian actress and model
- August 20
  - Amy Adams, American actress
  - Misha Collins, American actor
- August 21 - Paul Chowdhry, British comedian and actor
- August 23 – Ray Park, Scottish actor and stuntman
- August 31 - Marc Webb, American music video director and filmmaker
- September 1 - Burn Gorman, English actor and musician
- September 4 - Nona Gaye, American singer and retired actress
- September 5 - Romina Yan, Argentine actress, screenwriter and singer (d. 2010)
- September 6
  - Sarah Danielle Madison, American actress (d. 2014)
  - Justin Whalin, American former actor
- September 7 - Noah Huntley, English actor
- September 10 – Ryan Phillippe, American actor
- September 11 - Ben Best, American actor, writer, musician and producer (d. 2021)
- September 16 - Ed Stoppard, English actor
- September 18
  - Xzibit, American rapper, actor and broadcaster
  - Emily Rutherfurd, American actress
- September 19
  - Jimmy Fallon, American television host, comedian and actor
  - Victoria Silvstedt, Swedish actress and model
- September 30
  - Ashley Hamilton, American actor, comedian and singer-songwriter
  - Daniel Wu, Hong Kong-American actor, martial artist, singer, producer and race car driver
- October 1
  - Brandon Keener, American actor
  - Sherri Saum, American actress
- October 2 - Michelle Krusiec, American actress, writer and producer
- October 6
  - Fernando Chien, Taiwanese actor and stunt performer
  - Alexis Georgoulis, Greek actor
  - Jeremy Sisto, American actor, producer and writer
- October 7 - Numan Acar, Turkish-German actor and producer
- October 17
  - Matthew Macfadyen, English actor
  - Rizwan Manji, Canadian actor
- October 20 – Brian Limond, Scottish comedian, actor and writer
- October 28
  - Michael Dougherty, American director, screenwriter, producer and animator
  - Jake Kasdan, American filmmaker and actor
  - Joaquin Phoenix, American actor
- October 31
  - David Dencik, Danish-Swedish actor
  - Ruben Fleischer, American director and producer
- November 2 - Nelly, American actor, rapper and singer
- November 4 – Matthew Rhys, Welsh actor
- November 7 - Carl Steven, American child actor (d. 2011)
- November 9 - Ryo Kase, Japanese actor
- November 10 – Simone Singh, Indian actress
- November 11 – Leonardo DiCaprio, American actor
- November 12 - Tamala Jones, American actress
- November 14
  - Fatima Adoum, French actress
  - David Moscow, American actor and producer
- November 15 - Kathleen Rose Perkins, American actress
- November 16 – Chloë Sevigny, American actress
- November 21 – Tiit Sukk, Estonian actor
- November 24 - Stephen Merchant, English comedian, actor, writer, director and presenter
- November 25 - Kenneth Mitchell, Canadian actor (d. 2024)
- November 26 - Omar Chaparro, Mexican actor, comedian, television host and singer
- November 30 - Hinnerk Schönemann, German actor
- December 1 – Érica Rivas, Argentinian actress
- December 11 - Lisa Ortiz, American voice actress and voice director
- December 15 - P. J. Byrne, American actor
- December 17
  - Paul Briggs, American animator and voice actor
  - Sarah Paulson, American actress
  - Giovanni Ribisi, American actor
  - Marissa Ribisi, American actress
- December 24 - Thure Lindhardt, Danish actor
- December 25 - Andrew McNee, Canadian actor
- December 27 - Masi Oka, Japanese actor, producer and digital effects artist
- December 29 - Mekhi Phifer, American actor

== Deaths ==
Month
Date
Name
Age
Country
Profession
Notable films
January
2
Tex Ritter
68
US
Actor, Singer
- Trouble in Texas
- Where the Buffalo Roam
3
Gino Cervi
72
Italy
Actor
- Becket
- Black Eagle
14
Paul Whitsun-Jones
50
UK
Actor
- The Moonraker
- The Masque of the Red Death
31
Samuel Goldwyn
94
Poland
Producer, Studio Executive
- The Best Years of Our Lives
- Guys and Dolls
31
Roger Pryor
72
US
Actor
- Glamour for Sale
- The Return of Jimmy Valentine
February
7
Arline Judge
61
US
Actress
- The Sin of Harold Diddlebock
- Pigskin Parade
11
Anna Q. Nilsson
85
Sweden
Actress
- Sunset Boulevard
- Sorrell and Son
23
Florence Rice
67
US
Actress
- At the Circus
- Double Wedding
23
Harry Ruby
79
US
Screenwriter, Composer
- Horse Feathers
- Duck Soup
27
Orry-Kelly
66
Australia
Costume Designer
- An American in Paris
- Some Like It Hot
28
Carole Lesley
38
UK
Actress
- Woman in a Dressing Gown
- Three on a Spree
March
3
Barbara Ruick
43
US
Actress, Singer
- Carousel
- The Affairs of Dobie Gillis
5
Billy De Wolfe
67
US
Actor
- Dixie
- Tea for Two
7
Alberto Rabagliati
67
Italy
Actor, Singer
- The Barefoot Contessa
- Street Angel
8
Martha Wentworth
84
US
Actress, Voice Actress
- Santa Fe Uprising
- One Hundred and One Dalmatians
13
Howard St. John
68
US
Actor
- Born Yesterday
- Li'l Abner
19
Edward Platt
58
US
Actor
- North by Northwest
- Rebel Without a Cause
28
Dorothy Fields
68
US
Songwriter
- Swing Time
- Annie Get Your Gun
28
Françoise Rosay
82
France
Actress
- September Affair
- The Seventh Sin
29
Seton I. Miller
71
US
Screenwriter
- Scarface
- Here Comes Mr. Jordan
April
2
Douglass Dumbrille
84
Canada
Actor
- Mr. Deeds Goes to Town
- The Ten Commandments
10
Patricia Collinge
81
Ireland
Actress
- Shadow of a Doubt
- The Nun's Story
13
Stanley Smith
71
US
Actor
- Honey
- Love Among the Millionaires
18
Betty Compson
77
US
Actress
- The Docks of New York
- The Miracle Man
20
Peter Lee Lawrence
30
Germany
Actor
- For a Few Dollars More
- Black Beauty
24
Bud Abbott
78
US
Actor
- Abbott and Costello in Hollywood
- Little Giant
30
Agnes Moorehead
73
US
Actress
- Citizen Kane
- The Magnificent Ambersons
May
18
Mary Maguire
55
Australia
Actress
- The Outsider
- Sergeant Murphy
24
Duke Ellington
75
US
Composer
- Paris Blues
- Anatomy of a Murder
25
Donald Crisp
91
UK
Actor
- How Green Was My Valley
- National Velvet
June
6
Blanche Yurka
86
US
Actress
- A Tale of Two Cities
- Queen of the Mob
10
Lewis R. Foster
75
US
Director, Screenwriter
- Manhandled
- Hong Kong
17
Pamela Britton
51
US
Actress
- Anchors Aweigh
- D.O.A.
28
Frank Sutton
50
US
Actor
- Marty
- Town Without Pity
July
13
Joe Flynn
48
US
Actor
- McHale's Navy
- The Barefoot Executive
13
Marthe Vinot
79
France
Actress
- Le Mort vivant
- Le Calvaire
27
Julián de Meriche
65
Mexico
Actor
- The Incredible Invasion

28
Truman Bradley
69
US
Actor, Narrator
- Millionaires in Prison
- Murder Among Friends
August
13
Ilona Massey
64
Hungary
Actress
- Invisible Agent
- Love Happy
16
Maxwell Reed
55
Ireland
Actor
- Blackout
- The Notorious Landlady
September
6
Olga Baclanova
78
Russia
Actress
- Freaks
- The Wolf of Wall Street
6
Otto Kruger
89
US
Actor
- High Noon
- Magnificent Obsession
14
Barbara Jo Allen
68
US
Actress
- Sleeping Beauty
- The Sword in the Stone
14
Warren Hull
71
US
Actor
- Star Reporter
- Mandrake the Magician
18
Edna Best
74
UK
Actress
- The Man Who Knew Too Much
- The Ghost and Mrs. Muir
21
Jacqueline Susann
56
US
Author, Actress
- Valley of the Dolls
- Once Is Not Enough
21
Walter Brennan
80
US
Actor
- The Westerner
- Rio Bravo
22
Stephanie Bidmead
45
UK
Actress
- Invasion
- Running Scared
27
James R. Webb
64
US
Screenwriter
- How the West Was Won
- Cape Fear
October
13
Ed Sullivan
73
US
Actor
- Bye Bye Birdie
- The Singing Nun
November
7
Rodolfo Acosta
54
Mexico
Actor
- The Sons of Katie Elder
- One-Eyed Jacks
13
Vittorio De Sica
73
Italy
Actor, Director, Screenwriter
- Bicycle Thieves
- Miracle in Milan
14
Johnny Mack Brown
70
US
Actor
- Coquette
- Our Dancing Daughters
17
Clive Brook
87
UK
Actor
- Shanghai Express
- Sherlock Holmes
25
Rosemary Lane
61
US
Actress, Singer
- Four Wives
- The Return of Doctor X
December
4
Lee Kinsolving
36
US
Actor
- The Dark at the Top of the Stairs
- The Explosive Generation
5
Pietro Germi
60
Italy
Actor, Director, Screenwriter
- Divorce Italian Style
- Seduced and Abandoned
10
Paul Richards
50
US
Actor
- The Houston Story
- Beneath the Planet of the Apes
11
Reed Hadley
63
US
Actor
- The Baron of Arizona
- Big House, U.S.A.
15
Anatole Litvak
72
Ukraine
Director, Producer
- The Snake Pit
- Anastasia
21
Richard Long
47
US
Actor
- House on Haunted Hill
- The Stranger
26
Jack Benny
80
US
Actor
- To Be or Not to Be
- Broadway Melody of 1936

== Film debuts ==
- Selma Archerd – Airport 1975
- Armand Assante – The Lords of Flatbush
- Shabana Azmi – Parinay
- Humbert Balsan – Lancelot of the Lake
- Richard Belzer – The Groove Tube
- Tom Bower – The Trial of Billy Jack
- Tony Burton – The Black Godfather
- Chevy Chase – The Groove Tube
- Kent Cheng – Heroes Two
- Bill Cobbs – The Taking of Pelham One Two Three
- Starletta DuPois – Death Wish
- Robert Englund – Buster and Billie
- Jeff Goldblum – Death Wish
- Gloria Guida – Monika
- Chris Haywood – The Cars That Ate Paris
- Lawrence Hilton Jacobs – Claudine
- Kane Hodder – California Split
- Wendy Hughes – Petersen
- Clyde Kusatsu – Airport 1975
- Nick Mancuso – Black Christmas
- Sean McCann – A Quiet Day in Belfast
- Toshiyuki Nishida – Ranru no hata
- Edward James Olmos – Black Fist
- Raymond Serra – The Gambler
- Ray Sharkey – The Lords of Flatbush
- Stan Shaw – Truck Turner
- Delia Sheppard – The Spots on My Leopard
- Peter Simonischek – Die Auslieferung
- Steven Spielberg (director) – The Sugarland Express
- Jack Wallace – Death Wish
- Fred Ward – Ginger in the Morning
- Kenneth Welsh – Piaf
- Henry Winkler – Crazy Joe
