= Gnana Oli =

1972 film by P. Madhavan

- Theatrical release poster
- Directed by: P. Madhavan
- Story by: Vietnam Veedu Sundaram
- Produced by: P. K. V. Sankaran; Aarumugam
- Starring: Sivaji Ganesan; Vijaya Nirmala; Saratha; Srikanth
- Cinematography: P. N. Sundaram
- Edited by: R. Devarajan
- Music by: M. S. Viswanathan
- Production company: Jayaar Movies
- Release date: 11 March 1972
- Running time: 151 minutes
- Country: India
- Language: Tamil

Gnana Oli (transl. Light of Wisdom) is a 1972 Indian Tamil language film, directed by P. Madhavan and written by Vietnam Veedu Sundaram, starring Sivaji Ganesan. It is a loose adaptation of Victor Hugo's 1862 novel Les Miserables. This film was remade in Hindi as Devata (1978) and in Telugu as Chakravarthy (1987).

== Plot ==
Anthony an orphan, warm-hearted, yet physically effervescent is a wooden casket maker by profession. He is a regular church bell ringer raised by the guidance of the kind church Father. He marries. The day his lady goes into labour, he agrees to fabricate a wooden coffin for a supposedly dying person for his plausible money needs. Whilst fabricating he is notified that, that person who seemed dying miraculously survived, leaving his half-done coffin to no use, much to his irritation. However, the Father arrives and informs Anthony that a daughter was born, but also clarifies his half-done coffin was not merely a waste since his wife did not survive the labour. Shadowed with sadness, he raises his daughter, (named Marie, after Mother Mary) baptised by the father of the church he goes to. Life moves on.

Years later, his teen-aged daughter, (Marie) sent to the city for pursuing her education, comes home on holiday. The eldest Father blesses both Marie and Anthony and expresses his desire for Marie to reach the pinnacle of her career (that she was doing well) and must be capable of building trust organisations, education systems and hospitals for the well-being of the needy. Anthony desires that his daughter fulfill father's wishes that he even refuses to get her married to someone in near future. Later, Lawrence, a police officer, and Anthony's long-lost childhood friend are introduced to Anthony by the elder Father. A mutual and solid friendship bonds between the two.

Curious about his friends' daughters' intelligence traits, Lawrence expresses his interest to meet Marie, which Anthony accedes to. Lawrence and Anthony arrive at Anthony's home and both get shocked seeing Anthony's daughter in a prurient position with an unknown male, infuriating Anthony as he always considered her his divine gift from God, and lunges to kill her and her lover. Lawrence confronts Anthony's rage and stops him and gets his daughter to exchange rings as an informal marriage to her male lover in the very place they were caught and makes Anthony swear not to make any worse of the situation in the name of the Lord. Anthony, controlled by Lawrence's deed, informs this quagmire to the Father at the church the next day. The Father, seeking to correct things, makes Anthony arrange formally the marriage between the two. Anthony seeks the male friend who his daughter was caught with.

Tracing the boy as a different religion, Anthony meets a Hindu doctor who the boy claimed to be his father, but is devastated to found out he was a profuse liar. However, finding him, Anthony persuades him gently and pleads him to marry his daughter. But knowing his real playboy attitude, and his atrocity in refusing to marry Marie anguishes Anthony, who forcibly brings the boy to the church in order to do his wedding with his daughter. But things go horribly when he brought the boy to the church. He had accidentally killed the boy in the scuffle even though he didn't wish to. Lawrence arrives and arrests Anthony in front of the Father, who had no chances of helping his beloved son. Lawrence had to value his police job overseeing his friend's agony and loyalty to the eldest Father and the church and yet having him arrested. Anthony is sentenced.

A few days later, Anthony, behind bars, learns that his daughter also disappeared, much to his pain. At the church, the aged Father tells Lawrence his last wish to see Anthony and requests his temporary bail, since he had become too old to visit prisons. Abiding by the Father's request, Lawrence agrees to take care of Anthony after his sentence, but until which he will sincerely adhere to his police duty. Attributing his short temper and roguish nature whenever he gets anguished was that which lead him to being guilty despite being innocent by heart, the father gives Anthony a holy candlestick and makes Anthony promise him such that he should become a person of grown wisdom and requests him to act with purity. Having lost all the loved ones, except Lawrence, who had to serve justice, makes Anthony grieve. Until Anthony serves his sentence, Lawrence would only treat him as a vigilante and despise him. Remembering the Father's desire to build a good community of hospitals and educational institutions for the needy, and knowing it was not possible without his daughter, he decides to do so himself, while both condole the eldest father's loss.

After 2 decades, Anthony returns a mature and disciplined as Mr. Arun, a millionaire, changed not to escape Lawrence or the law for the murder he had accidentally committed, but for the solemn promise he made to the late Father that raised him for serving the needs of poor that he himself wanted Marie to do as Anthony. Once he finishes serving the good deeds as per his father's wish, he would eventually turn himself to the law for his crime. He had fulfilled almost all promises to his church Father of serving mankind. He comes back to the church where he rang the bell during his initial days and meets other children in the orphanage he founded and is on the verge of turning himself in to the law for his crime. He gets shocked to see his own daughter Marie as a teacher in that same church, who he had assumed expired. Before he could confess to Marie that he was none other than her own father, he comes to notice Lawrence was still around. As a guardian of Marie and her family, Lawrence was always around them fulfilling his promise of supporting his friend Anthony's family should he be absent. Anthony's escape led the police department to suspect Lawrence since they were once best friends, and hence his promotion was denied. However, he stuck around Marie hoping to find Anthony and be true to his duty.

Eventually learning Marie has a daughter herself who was of marriageable age, he yearned to see them. Arun (Anthony), during his rise to fame was deprived of a family by the loss of his loved ones, especially the church Father and his daughter Marie. Having known not all his loved ones are dead, he considers his granddaughter's well-being his last duty. Meanwhile, unaware that Mr. Arun was none but her own dad, Anthony, she kept away from him. Marie had lived with the same good Hindu doctor, the one whom she had a relationship with had claimed to be his father. They eventually meet, where Arun exposes his real identity to Marie as she relates that her father was back in an emotional confluence. Lawrence, meanwhile, learns of Arun as a new wealthy icon in town and greets Arun, who out of compulsion meet each other. Lawrence, familiar with Anthony's face and body language is suspicious about Arun's activity being similar to Anthony's, but he discreetly hesitates as Arun (Anthony) was a social figure and could not be approached easily, let alone be apprehended.

Arun arrives to know that Marie's daughter (his own granddaughter) falls in love similar to what Marie did when she was in her age. Having known it was Lawrence's son she was in love with, he does not object, in the name of philanthropy.

== Cast ==
- Sivaji Ganesan as Antony/Arun
- Vijaya Nirmala as Rani
- Saratha as Marie
- Srikanth as Baskar
- Major Sundarrajan as Lawrence (I.P.S Officer, Antony's friend)
- V. K. Ramasamy as Dr. Saravanan
- Manorama as Valliyammal
- M. R. R. Vasu as Nallasivam
- Kathadi Ramamurthy as Passenger in the train
- Senthamarai as Head of Police officer
- Gokulnath as Father Adaikalam
- Jaya Kausalya as Rani
- Comedy Shanmugam as Rani's father
- Seetha Lakshmi as Rani's mother
- I.S.R as Venkatramji local politician

== Soundtrack ==
The music was composed by M. S. Viswanathan, with lyrics by Kannadasan.

Song	Singers	Length
"Amma Kannu"	T. M. Soundararajan, P. Susheela	03:19
"Devane Ennai"	T. M. Soundararajan	05:01
"Manamedai"	P. Susheela	03:50

== Release and reception ==
Gnana Oli was released on 11 March 1972, and ran for over 100 days in theatres. Sivaji Ganesan won the Filmfare Award for Best Actor – Tamil.

== See also ==
- Adaptations of Les Misérables
