= Kasi Yathirai =

1973 film by S. P. Muthuraman

- Title card
- Directed by: S. P. Muthuraman
- Written by: V. C. Guhanathan
- Produced by: S. S. Sethuraman
- Starring: V. K. Ramasamy; Manorama
- Cinematography: Babu S. I. C. A
- Edited by: R. Vittal
- Music by: Shankar–Ganesh
- Production company: Sri Devi Cine Arts
- Release date: 10 June 1973
- Running time: 128 minutes
- Country: India
- Language: Tamil

Kasi Yathirai (lit. 'Kashi Yatra', transl. Pilgrimage to Kasi) is a 1973 Indian Tamil-language romantic comedy film, directed by S. P. Muthuraman and written by V. C. Guhanathan. Soundtrack was composed by Shankar–Ganesh. The film stars V. K. Ramasamy, Srikanth and Suruli Rajan with Kumari Padmini, Jaya, Manorama (in dual role), M. R. R. Vasu and Cho Ramaswamy in supporting roles. Kamal Haasan worked under Thangappan as his dance assistant in this film. It was released on 10 June 1973, and ran for over 100 days in theatres.

== Plot ==
Paramasivam Pillai is an unmarried Hanuman devotee that insists on his niece Uma and nephew Ramu also remaining unmarried. Ramu is in love with Seetha but is too scared of his uncle to marry her. He meets a man named Shankar who proposes a solution and enters their home posing as a Hanuman devotee to try to change Paramasivam's mind. An oddball cast of characters, including drama actress Andal, her brother Mayandi, Jaya's uncle Chokkalingam and others get pulled into Shankar's plans creating comedic chaos.

== Cast ==
Actors

- V. K. Ramasamy as Paramasivam Pillai
- Cho Ramaswamy as Chokkalingam
- Srikanth as Ramu
- Suruli Rajan as Shankar
- Thengai Srinivasan as Kanthasamy
- M. R. R. Vasu as Mayandi
- Appalachari as Markandeyan Shastri
- ISR as Munniyappan Paramasivam Pillai's Assistant
- Typist Gopu as Kattakula Swamyji

Actresses

- Manorama as Andal/Lalitha
- Jaya as Seetha
- Kumari Padmini as Uma
- Gandhimathi as Parvathi

== Production ==
A scene with Srikanth and V. K. Ramasamy was shot at Karpagam Studios.

== Soundtrack ==
Music was composed by Shankar–Ganesh and lyrics were written by Vaali and Panchu Arunachalam.

Songs	Singer	Length
"Anjaneya Anumanthaiah"	S. V. Ponnusamy, S. P. Balasubrahmanyam, 'Kovai' Sundarrajan, B. S. Sasirekha	6:18
"Amaravathy Nenjame"	S. V. Ponnusamy, Manorama	8:36
"Azhagin Avatharam"	L. R. Eswari	3:00
"Ammadio Chithappa"	S. P. Balasubrahmanyam, Rajendra Krishna, 'Kovai' Sundarrajan, L. R. Eswari, B. S. Sasirekha	3:31

== Reception ==
Kanthan of Kalki appreciated Guhanathan's dialogues and Muthuraman's direction. Navamani praised the acting, humour and direction.
