= Selva Magal =

- Title card
- Directed by: K. V. Srinivas
- Screenplay by: Subbu Arumugam
- Story by: Rajasri
- Produced by: T. S. Rajasundaresan
- Starring: Jaishankar; Rajasree; Srikanth; Shylashri; Nagesh; Major Sundarrajan
- Cinematography: C. A. S. Mani
- Edited by: P. V. Narayanan
- Music by: M. S. Viswanathan
- Production company: Saravana Screen
- Release date: 20 August 1967
- Running time: 119 minutes
- Country: India
- Language: Tamil

Selva Magal (transl. Wealthy Daughter) is a 1967 Indian Tamil-language romantic action film, directed by K. V. Srinivas and produced by T. S. Rajasundaresan. The dialogue was written by Subbu Arumugam and the story written by Rajasri. Music was by M. S. Viswanathan. It stars Jaishankar, Rajasree, Srikanth, Shylashri, Nagesh and Major Sundarrajan. The film, initially known as Engirundho Vanthaan, was a box office hit.

== Plot ==
After a string of robberies, Balaram flees the country abandoning his wife Parvathi and son. Circumstances separate mother and child, leaving the young boy under the care of Sekar, who raises him into a well educated gentleman. Sekar falls in love with Sarada, the only daughter of a wealthy banker, Ranganathan. Meanwhile, Balaram returns to the country and, with the help of his stepson Mohan, runs a shady business under the alias, Balasundaram. He targets Ranganathan and plots to claim him, while Mohan sets his eyes on Sarada. Soon, a deadly game of deception is set in motion where everyone is left to confront their past.

== Cast ==
- Jaishankar as Sekar
- Rajasree as Sarada
- Srikanth as Mohan
- Shylashri
- Nagesh as Malayali Madhavan Cooker
- Major Sundarrajan as Balaram
- V. S. Raghavan as Ranganathan
- Pandari Bai as Parvathi
- Madhavi
- Goundamani as Office Clerk

== Soundtrack ==
Music was composed by M. S. Viswanathan.

Song	Singer	Lyrics	Length
"Avan Ninaithana"	T. M. Soundararajan	Kannadasan	4:26
"Yae Paranthu Sillu"	T. M. Soundararajan P. Susheela	Kannadasan	4:41
"Kuyilaga Naan"	T. M. Soundararajan P. Susheela	Vaali	3:52
"Vennila Mugam"	T. M. Soundararajan L. R. Eswari	Vaali	3:41

== Reception ==
Kalki appreciated the film's dialogues and fight sequences but criticised the overuse of the latter. The critic said that while the film began on a fast pace, it should have maintained that till the end.
