= Karunai Ullam =

- Theatrical release poster
- Directed by: A. Bhimsingh
- Written by: Jayakanthan
- Based on: Karunaiyinal Alla by Jayakanthan
- Produced by: Vasantha Baalaiyya
- Starring: Srikanth; Vijayakumar; K. R. Vijaya; Jaya
- Edited by: Paul Duraisingam
- Music by: Shankar–Ganesh
- Production company: M. S. V. Movies
- Release date: 29 September 1978
- Running time: 114 minutes
- Country: India
- Language: Tamil

Karunai Ullam (transl. Merciful Heart) is a 1978 Tamil-language film written by Jayakanthan and directed by A. Bhimsingh. The film stars Srikanth and K. R. Vijaya. It is based on Jayakanthan's novel Karunaiyinal Alla (transl. Not out of mercy). The film was released on 29 September 1978.

== Plot ==
A lone middle-aged woman, Gauri, meets Mudaliar, another middle-aged man in the house of her boss. She also comes across her old lover, whom she did not marry in respect for her mother's words. Her old lover comes in search of her and asks her to marry him as his ailing wife is dying. She refuses but decides to marry Mudaliar, to fill the gap, she feels in her life.

== Cast ==
- Srikanth
- K. R. Vijaya
- Vijayakumar
- Jaya Guhanathan
- Suman

== Production ==
Karunai Ullam was produced by M. S. V. Movies, and was the last film directed by A. Bhimsingh to release.

== Reception ==
Naagai Dharuman of Anna praised the acting of cast and Bhimsingh's direction. Sreekanth received Tamil Nadu State Film Award for Best Actor for his performance in the film.
