= Chakkaram =

1968 film by A. Kasilingam

- Theatrical release poster
- Directed by: A. Kasilingam
- Screenplay by: A. Kasilingam
- Story by: Madurai Thirumaran
- Produced by: K. R. Balan
- Starring: Gemini Ganesan; A. V. M. Rajan; Vennira Aadai Nirmala
- Cinematography: Vijayan
- Music by: S. M. Subbaiah Naidu
- Production company: Annai Films
- Release date: 6 December 1968
- Running time: 144 minutes
- Country: India
- Language: Tamil

Chakkaram (transl. Wheel) is a 1968 Indian Tamil-language action film, written and directed by A. Kasilingam. The film stars Gemini Ganesan, A. V. M. Rajan and Vennira Aadai Nirmala. It revolves around a secretary who seeks to apprehend a thief in order to claim a bounty. The film was released on 6 December 1968, and failed commercially.

== Plot ==
Jambu is a thief who lives in the forests avoiding the police. There is a bounty of ₹1 lakh (equivalent to ₹56 lakh or US$58,000 in 2026) on his head. Meenakshi is an estate owner in heavy debt. Her secretary Babu and his friends head to the forest in search of Jambu to claim the reward. The rest of the story deals with how the money is obtained.

== Cast ==
- Gemini Ganesan as Babu
- A. V. M. Rajan as Jambu
- Sowcar Janaki as Meenakshi (guest appearance)
- Vennira Aadai Nirmala
- Rajakokila as Rajathi
- Nagesh
- Manorama
- Major Sundarrajan
- O. A. K. Thevar
- M. R. R. Vasu
- V. S. Raghavan
- C. S. Pandian
- S. S. Sivasuriyan
- Vasantha

== Production ==
Chakkaram was directed by A. Kasilingam who also wrote the screenplay. The film was produced by K. R. Balan under Annai Films. The cinematography was handled by Vijayan. The final length of the film was 3,938 metres (12,920 ft). The scene where Rajan's character threatens a couple was shot at Tiruverkadu for ten days.

== Soundtrack ==
The soundtrack was composed by S. M. Subbaiah Naidu, while the lyrics were written by Vaali. The song "Kasethan Kadavulappa" attained popularity.

Track listing
No.	Title	Singer(s)	Length
1.	"Kasethan Kadavulappa"	T. M. Soundararajan	3:25
2.	"Kulikka Pora Kumaripponnu"	T. M. Soundararajan, P. Susheela	4:20
3.	"Neeye Oru Neram Sollu"	T. M. Soundararajan, P. Susheela	4:35
4.	"Oru Naal Iravu Orumani"	L. R. Eswari	4:09
Total length:			16:29

== Release and reception ==
Chakkaram was released on 6 December 1968, and failed commercially.
