= Dr. Siva =

- Theatrical release poster
- Directed by: A. C. Tirulokchandar
- Written by: A. L. Narayanan (dialogues)
- Screenplay by: A. C. Tirulokchandar
- Story by: A. C. Tirulokchandar
- Starring: Sivaji Ganesan; Manjula
- Cinematography: M. Viswanatha Rai
- Edited by: B. Kanthasamy
- Music by: M. S. Viswanathan
- Production company: Cine Bharath
- Release date: 2 November 1975
- Country: India
- Language: Tamil

Dr. Siva is a 1975 Indian Tamil-language film, directed and produced by A. C. Tirulokchandar. The film stars Sivaji Ganesan, Manjula, V. K. Ramasamy and Major Sundarrajan. It was released on 2 November 1975.

== Plot ==
Dr. Siva is a well-to-do, well respected and a fun-loving doctor. He meets and falls in love with Geetha and they get married. However, trouble enters their life in form of Ammu who Siva sees as a sister with everyone else misunderstanding their relationship. Ammu dies under mysterious circumstances and the blame falls on him. Does he clear his name?

== Cast ==
- Sivaji Ganesan as Dr. Siva
- Manjula as Geetha
- Major Sundarrajan as Lawyer Govindharathnam
- Pandari Bai as Lakshmi
- M. R. R. Vasu as Lawyer Varathan
- V. K. Ramasamy as Paunraj
- Nagesh as Babu
- Manorama as Meenambal
- Gandhimathi as Parvathi
- Jayamalini as Amutha/Ammu
- Typist Gopu as Lawyer Venkatraman
- Pakoda Kadhar as Seenu
- Premanand as Dr. Suresh
- Rajapandiyan as Muthaiya

== Soundtrack ==
All the songs were composed by M. S. Viswanathan, and written by Vaali. The song "Malare Kurinji" is set in Charukesi raga.

Track listing
No.	Title	Singer(s)	Length
1.	"Kannang Karutha Kuyil"	Kovai Soundarrajan	4:38
2.	"Malarae Kurinji Malarae"	K. J. Yesudas, S. Janaki	3:29
3.	"Nallavar Kuralukku"	T. M. Soundararajan	5:14
4.	"Taaja Panni"	T. M. Soundararajan	4:38
5.	"Kadhal Sarithirathai"	T. M. Soundararajan,P. Susheela	4:38
Total length:			17:59

== Reception ==
Kanthan of Kalki appreciated the film for the cinematography, Tirulokchander's direction and writing, and Narayanan's dialogues. Manjula gained much notice due to appearing in glamorous, revealing clothes, contrary to the sisterly, conservative roles she played in previous films.
