= Jamboo =

1980 film by M. Karnan

- Film poster
- Directed by: M. Karnan
- Screenplay by: M. Karnan
- Story by: Maa. Ra
- Produced by: M. Karnan
- Starring: Jaishankar
- Cinematography: M. Karnan
- Edited by: G. Kalyana Sundaram; K. Gouthaman
- Music by: Shankar–Ganesh
- Production company: Indrani Films
- Release date: 15 January 1980
- Running time: 122 minutes
- Country: India
- Language: Tamil

Jamboo is 1980 Indian Tamil-language action adventure film, co-written, directed and produced by M. Karnan from a story by Maa. Ra. The film stars Jaishankar, leading an ensemble cast that includes Major Sundarrajan, S. A. Ashokan, Thengai Srinivasan, M. R. R. Vasu, Manorama and Jayamala. It was released on 15 January 1980.

== Plot ==
A varied group of travellers on a flight to the United States find themselves stranded on an island. They are rescued by Jamboo, who has lived on the island by himself since childhood. He is capable of surviving the harsh surrounding full of wild animals, raging rivers and other natural dangers. Jamboo takes on the task of keeping the crash survivors alive and eventually lead them off the island. They are forced to stay on the island until the circumstances are right for them to attempt an escape. The film chronicles the many varied dangers they face as they attempt to get home.

== Cast ==
- Jaishankar as Jamboo
- Major Sundarrajan as Saamy
- S. A. Ashokan as Paranthaman
- Thengai Srinivasan
- M. R. R. Vasu
- Manorama as Anjalai
- Jayamala as Geetha
- Jaya Vani as Radha
- Lalitha as Noori
- Praveena as Tribal princess
- Mallika
- Jothi Kanna
- Kanchana
- Vimala
- Manjula
- Kovai Shantha
- Vennira Aadai Moorthy
- S. V. Ramadas
- Oru Viral Krishna Rao
- Mottai Seetha Raman
- P. L. Selvaraj
- Franco
- Prabhakar
- Master Sivakumar

== Soundtrack ==
Music was written by Shankar–Ganesh and lyrics were written by Kannadasan.

Songs	Length
"Yenga Vandha Yenga"	04:49
"Yen Intha Mayakkam"	05:36
"Oh Rama Oh Rama"	05:30
"Machaan Thota Mazaa"	03:02

== Reception ==
Kanthan of Kalki said it was disheartening to see a film like Jamboo at a time when Tamil cinema was progressing.
