= Ilaya Thalaimurai =

- Poster
- Directed by: Krishnan–Panju
- Written by: Malliyam Rajagopal
- Starring: Sivaji Ganesan; Vanisri
- Cinematography: S. Maruthi Rao
- Edited by: Panjabi
- Music by: M. S. Viswanathan
- Production company: Yogachitra
- Release date: 28 May 1977
- Country: India
- Language: Tamil

Ilaya Thalaimurai (transl. Younger Generation) is a 1977 Indian Tamil-language film, directed by Krishnan–Panju and written by Malliyam Rajagopal. The film stars Sivaji Ganesan and Vanisri.

== Plot ==
Sampath is a poor graduate trying to find a job. Sakunthala is a rich young woman whose mother wants her to marry Kalai the chairman and also a friend of Sampath. Sakunthala and Sampath fall in love but face resistance from her mother and Kalai. Sampath heads to Madras to find work and becomes the warden of a college dorm. The terms of the job require him to remain unmarried and he isolates himself from Sakunthala. At the dorm, he is strict but acts as a positive guide to the students, helping them through various issues. His exacting expectations earn him a few enemies among the students, particularly Vasu. Sampath faces obstacles both in his mission to ensure the younger generation are heading in the right direction and in his goal of reuniting with Sakunthala.

== Cast ==
- Sivaji Ganesan as Sampath
- Vanisri as Sakunthala
- V. K. Ramasamy
- K. D. Santhanam
- M. N. Rajam as Kokila
- S. N. Lakshmi
- Srikanth as Vasu
- Vijayakumar as Pandu
- M. R. R. Vasu as Kalai
- Nagesh as Sharma
- Suruli Rajan
- Y. G. Mahendran
- Manorama as Ambujam Maami
- K. Vijayan
- Kathadi Ramamurthy
- Junior Balaiah as Gopal
- Veeraraghavan

== Production ==
The scenes and songs with Ganesan and Vanisri were shot at Mercara while also shot at Gundlipet, Mysuru and Bengaluru. Some scenes were shot at Vauhini Studios.

== Soundtrack ==
The music was composed by M. S. Viswanathan.

Song	Singers	Lyrics	Length
"Ilaya Thalai Murai"	M. S. Viswanathan, Kovai Soundararajan	Malliyam Rajagopal	04:28
"Kannanavan"	T. M. Soundararajan	Kannadasan	04:24
"Kettaiye Oru Kelvi"	T. M. Soundararajan, P. Susheela	Kannadasan	03:27
"Oru Naal Iravu"	P. Susheela	Kannadasan	04:08
"Oru Arai Koduththal"	T. M. Soundararajan, Vani Jairam	Kannadasan	03:40
"Pombalaya Latchanama"	T. M. Soundararajan	Kannadasan	03:28
"Singara Therkooda"	T. M. Soundararajan	Kannadasan	04:39
"Yaar Enna Sonnal"	T. M. Soundararajan	Kannadasan	03:36

== Critical reception ==
In a review dated 14 November 1976, Kanthan of Kalki criticised the story, said the film's only redeeming aspect was its cinematography.
