= Rojavin Raja =

1976 Indian Tamil film

- Poster
- Directed by: K. Vijayan
- Written by: A. Veerappan
- Produced by: N. V. Ramasamy
- Starring: Sivaji Ganesan; Vanisri
- Cinematography: M. Kannappa
- Edited by: B. Kanthasamy
- Music by: M. S. Viswanathan
- Distributed by: N. V. R. Pictures
- Release date: 15 December 1976
- Country: India
- Language: Tamil

Rojavin Raja (transl. King of Roses) is a 1976 Indian Tamil-language film, directed by K. Vijayan and produced by N. V. Ramasamy. The film stars Sivaji Ganesan, Vanisri, A. V. M. Rajan and Cho. It was released on 15 December 1976.

== Plot ==
Raja is the poor son of a teacher Visalam. Gopal is his rich best friend that often helps him financially. Janaki is the only child of a rich man Selvanayagam and falls in love with Raja. Her father, Selvanayagam, objects as Raja is poor and arranges her marriage with Gopal. Raja is stuck between wanting to be with the woman he loves and his best friend's happiness.

== Cast ==
- Sivaji Ganesan as Raja
- Vanisri as Janaki
- A. V. M. Rajan as Gopal
- Srikanth as Thiyagu
- Major Sundarrajan as Selvanayagam
- Sukumari as Amirtham
- S. Varalakshmi as Sivakami
- Kumari Rukmani as Visalam
- R. S. Manohar as Rasappa
- Senthamarai as Rasappa Assistant
- V. K. Ramasamy as Kadapparai Murugesan
- Cho as Jambu
- Manorama as Manthagini
- Suruli Rajan as Suruli
- Neelu as the college professor
- Usilai Mani as Swimming Pool Swimmar
- C. I. D. Sakunthala as Nirmala
- Comedy Shanmugam as Small Role

== Production ==
The film was launched at AVM Studios in March 1973. Sandow M. M. A. Chinnappa Thevar switched on the camera and a scene with Ganesan was filmed on that day. A scene with Ganesan and his mother was shot at Saradha Studios. A fight sequence between Ganesan and Manohar was shot at Shoranur forest in January 1976.

== Soundtrack ==
The music was composed by M. S. Viswanathan. All songs written by Kannadasan.

Song	Singers	Length
"Alankaaram"	T. M. Soundararajan, P. Susheela	03:11
"Janaganin Mahalai"	P. Susheela	03:23
"Naalai Nee Mannavan"	T. M. Soundararajan	03:10
"Odikkonde Iruppen"	T. M. Soundararajan	03:18
"Rojavin Raja"	T. M. Soundararajan, P. Susheela	03:04

== Reception ==
Kanthan of Kalki praised the acting of Sivaji Ganesan and other actors, humour, dialogues and cinematography and noted even though the end of the story is known, Rojavin Raja never bores and is heartwarming.
