= Palabishegham =

- Poster
- Directed by: K. S. Gopalakrishnan
- Written by: K. S. Gopalakrishnan
- Produced by: T. Raju
- Starring: Jaishankar; Srikanth; Sripriya; S. A. Ashokan; Rajasulochana
- Cinematography: Nellai S. S. Maniyan
- Edited by: R. Devarajan
- Music by: Shankar–Ganesh
- Production company: Kalavalli Combines
- Release date: 14 May 1977
- Running time: 146 minutes
- Country: India
- Language: Tamil

Palabishegham (/pɑːləbiʃeɪɡəm/ transl. Abhisheka of Milk) is a 1977 Indian Tamil-language film written and directed by K. S. Gopalakrishnan. The film stars Jaishankar, Srikanth, Sripriya and Rajasulochana. It was released on 14 May 1977.

== Plot ==
Kumaran is a hard working farmer living a simple life along with his mother Meenakshi. In reality, Meenakshi is the wife of the village landlord, who lives with his concubine Sengamalam and a son named Muthaiah. Kumaran despises Muthaiah and they lock horns to win the love of Sivagami. Sivagami chooses to marry Kumaran, but her father "Poisatchi" Boothalingam does not approve. So Sivagamai escapes her home and marries Kumaran. Muthaiah and his mother plot to destroy Kumaran. Sengamalam also hatches a secret plan along with Boothalingam to take over the landlord's property.

Sengamalam is seen in a compromising position with Boothalingam by Muthaiah, who now understands the true intentions of his mother. Sengamalam's plan is to kill the landlord by giving milk laced with poison and make it look like suicide, for which she writes a letter to the police by imitating the landlord's signature. This plan is overheard by Muthaiah, who informs Kumaran and his mother to help save their father and also asks for an apology from Kumaran. Now Kumaran and Muthaiah unite to thwart the plan and save the landlord, who realises his mistake and regrets his misdeeds and apologises to his wife Meenakshi and unites with his first family.

== Cast ==
- Jaishankar as Kumaran
- Srikanth as Muthaiah
- Sripriya as Sivakami
- S. A. Ashokan as Ekambaram
- Pandari Bai as Meenakshi
- Rajasulochana as Sengamalam
- Thengai Srinivasan as "Poisatchi" Bhuthalingam
- Suruli Rajan
- T. K. S. Natarajan
- Samikannu
- Typist Gopu

== Production ==
The film was primarily shot at Kerugambakkam.

== Soundtrack ==
Music was composed by Shankar–Ganesh and lyrics were written by Vaali and A. Maruthakasi.

Song	Singers	Length
"Aalamarathu Kili"	Vani Jairam	3:31
"Padam Edukkum Pambu"	Vani Jairam	3:02
"Machane Acharam Podu"	Vani Jairam, Krishnamoorthy	3:08
"Kundril Aadum Kumaranukku"	T. K. Kala, S. C. Krishnan	2:11

== Release ==
The film ran for 50 days in theatres and its celebration event was held at Kerugambakkam.
