= Gruhapravesam (1976 film) =

- Theatrical release poster
- Directed by: D. Yoganand
- Written by: Nannu Chandra; Vietnam Veedu Sundaram (dialogues)
- Produced by: T. S. Muthu Swamy; D. Yoganand
- Starring: Sivaji Ganesan; K. R. Vijaya; Sivakumar; Jaya
- Cinematography: P. Bhaskar Rao
- Edited by: R. Vittal
- Music by: M. S. Viswanathan
- Production company: Prosperity Pictures
- Release date: 10 April 1976
- Country: India
- Language: Tamil

Gruhapravesam (transl. Housewarming) is a 1976 Indian Tamil-language drama film, co-produced and directed by D. Yoganand. The film stars Sivaji Ganesan, K. R. Vijaya, Sivakumar and Jaya. It was released on 10 April 1976.

== Plot ==
Raju and Lakshmi live with Ravi, Raju's brother in the same house. They sacrifice everything to make Raju successful in his education and career going so far as to having no children. Ravi too loves and looks up to them. Ravi comes back after completing his education but with Uma introducing her as her lover. Though initially taken aback, seeing Uma is a good girl and a rich girl, they accede and all seems to go well until one day when they realise that Uma has bipolar disorder and she swings between extremes. How they handle Uma without breaking up the family forms the rest of the story.

== Cast ==
- Sivaji Ganesan as Mechanical Benz Raju
- K. R. Vijaya as Lakshmi
- Sivakumar as Ravi
- Jaya as Uma
- Major Sundarrajan as Uma's father
- M. R. R. Vasu as Velu
- Manorama as Arulmozhi
- V. R. Thilagam as Kalyani
- Kuladeivam Rajagopal as Workshop Mechanical man
- C. I. D. Sakunthala as Drama Stage Actress
- K. K. Soundar as Ramu
- Heran Ramasamy as Sankar
- Master Ramu as Babu

== Production ==
Sivakumar who played Ganesan's son in earlier films enacted the role of his younger brother in this film. Some scenes were shot at Vauhini Studios.

== Soundtrack ==
The soundtrack was composed by M. S. Viswanathan, and lyrics were written by Kannadasan.

| Song | Singers | Length |
|---|---|---|
| "Ulagam Perithu" | T. M. Soundararajan | 04:11 |
| "Aiothi Arasalum" | T. M. Soundararajan, Kovai Soundararajan, Sasirekha | 06:58 |
| "Enga Veettu Rani" | T. M. Soundararajan, P. Susheela | 04:16 |
| "Sathiyathin Sothanaikku" | T. M. Soundararajan | 04:10 |
| "Kandru Theadi Varum" | T. M. Soundararajan | 03:20 |

== Reception ==
Kanthan of Kalki likened the film to old wine in new bottle. Naagai Dharuman of Navamani praised the acting, music, dialogues, cinematography and direction.
