= Ungal Viruppam =

1974 Indian film

- Theatrical release poster
- Directed by: K. Krishnamoorthy
- Screenplay by: K. Krishnamoorthy
- Story by: Panchu Arunachalam
- Starring: Jaishankar; Jayachitra
- Cinematography: Dutt
- Edited by: L. Balu
- Music by: Vijaya Bhaskar
- Production company: Sri Chitra Mahal
- Release date: 5 July 1974
- Country: India
- Language: Tamil

Ungal Viruppam (transl. Your wish) is a 1974 Indian Tamil-language comedy film directed and co-written by K. Krishnamoorthy. The film stars Jaishankar and Jayachitra. It was released on 5 July 1974.

== Cast ==
- Jaishankar
- Jayachitra
- Manorama
- A. Sakunthala
- S. N. Lakshmi
- V. K. Ramasamy
- Thangavelu
- Thengai Srinivasan
- M. R. R. Vasu
- Sasikumar
- V. Gopalakrishnan

== Production ==
The film began production in March 1974 at Modern Theatres studio.

== Soundtrack ==
The music was composed by Vijaya Bhaskar. Lyrics were written by Kannadasan.

Track listing
No.	Title	Singer(s)	Length
1.	"Manjal Poosi"	Kovai Soundararajan, L. R. Anjali
2.	"Enna Maharani"	S. P. Balasubrahmanyam, Vani Jairam
3.	"Adayappa"	S. P. Balasubrahmanyam, Vani Jairam
4.	"Azhagu Thiranthu"	L. R. Anjali

== Release and reception ==
Ungal Viruppam was released on 5 July 1974. Navamani appreciated the film's comedy, cast performances, music and the screenplay and direction by Krishnamoorthy, as well as Arunachalam's dialogues, even if the story was shallow.
