= Naan Potta Savaal =

1980 film

- Poster of Tamil version
- Directed by: Puratchidasan
- Written by: Puratchidasan
- Produced by: G. Sarangan
- Starring: Rajinikanth; Reena
- Cinematography: Vijayakumar
- Edited by: Venkatesh
- Music by: Ilaiyaraaja
- Production company: Kanaga Saragar Films
- Release dates: 7 August 1980 (Tamil); 15 June 1984 (Telugu)
- Running time: 130 minutes
- Country: India
- Languages: Tamil; Telugu

Naan Potta Savaal (transl. The challenge I laid) is 1980 Indian Tamil-language Western film directed by Puratchidasan. The film stars Rajinikanth and Reena, with M. R. Radha and M. R. R. Vasu in supporting roles. It did not do well at the box office. The film was simultaneously shot in Telugu as Idhe Naa Savaal (transl. This is my challenge) with a slightly different cast.

== Cast ==
Character	Actors in Language		Description
Character	Tamil	Telugu	Description
Ramu /Shiva (Tamil) / - (Telugu)	Rajinikanth	Rajinikanth	
Roopa (Tamil) / - (Telugu)	Reena	Reena	
Lakshmi (Tamil) / - (Telugu)	Pandari Bai	Pandari Bai	Ramu / Shiva's mother
Justice Janarthan (Tamil) / - (Telugu)	Major Sundarrajan	Kantha Rao	Ramu / Shiva's father
Venucharavarthy (Tamil) / - (Telugu)	V. S. Raghavan	Mukkamala	Ramu / Shiva's house owner
Hero's friend	C. L. Anandan	C. L. Anandan	
Marikkolunthu (Tamil) / - (Telugu)	Manorama	Manorama	
Marikkolunthu's Lover (Tamil) / - (Telugu)	Suruli Rajan	Raja Babu	
Ardhanari (Tamil) / - (Telugu)	M. R. Radha	Nagabhushanam	
Prabhudas	S. A. Ashokan	Pemmasani Ramakrishna	
Dr. Tower	R. S. Manohar	Prabhakar Reddy	
M. B. Singh (Tamil) / - (Telugu)	K. Kannan	Tyagaraju	
Advocate Arthanari (Tamil) / - (Telugu)	M. R. R. Vasu	Chandru	
Rama (Tamil) / Ramu (Telugu)	Anand Mohan	Anand Mohan	
Himachalam (Tamil) / Simhachalam (Telugu)	Ceylon Manohar	Ceylon Manohar	
Bhoominathan (Tamil) / - (Telugu)	S. V. Ramadas	S. V. Ramadas	
Special Appearance	Jayamalini	Jayamalini	

== Production ==
Naan Potta Saval is the first film in which the screen credits carried the title "Super Star" for Rajinikanth. The scene where Rajinikanth fights with Kannan in a palace was shot at Sharada Studios.

== Soundtrack ==
Tamil songs

Lyrics for the songs were written by film director Puratchidasan himself. The song "Sugam Sugame" is set to the raga Shuddha Saveri.

Song	Singer	Duration
"Mayakkama Oru Thayakkamaa"	Vani Jayaram	4:42
"Naatukulla"	Malaysia Vasudevan	4:05
"Nenje Un Aasai"	T. L. Maharajan	4:13
"Silarai Devai"	Vani Jairam,S. P. Sailaja	4:18
"Sugam Sugame"	Malaysia Vasudevan, Vani Jayaram	4:26

Telugu songs

Song	Singer	Duration
"Desamlo Konni Nakkalunnayi"	S. P. Balasubrahmanyam	4:05
"Choodana Jatha Goodana"	Vani Jairam	4:32
"Evaru Nannapaleru"	S. P. Balasubrahmanyam	4:25
"Kowgililo"	S. P. Balasubrahmanyam, Vani Jairam	4:18
