= Kadhalikka Vanga =

- Title card
- Directed by: I. N. Murthy
- Story by: Tamilvanan
- Produced by: Tamilvanan
- Starring: Jaishankar; Major Sundarrajan; Thengai Srinivasan; Manorama; Srikanth; Shabnam
- Cinematography: Chitti Babu
- Edited by: K. Balu
- Music by: Raghava Naidu
- Production company: Comedy Pictures
- Release date: 25 February 1972
- Running time: 149 minutes
- Country: India
- Language: Tamil

Kadhalikka Vanga (transl. Come to love) is a 1972 Indian Tamil language film produced and written by Tamilvanan, starring Jaishankar, Srikanth and Major Sundarrajan with Manorama, Kavitha, Vijaya Girija and Thengai Srinivasan in supporting roles. It was released on 25 February 1972.

== Cast ==
- Jaishankar as Tamilarasu
- Major Sundarrajan as Judo
- Srikanth as Ramesh
- Kavitha as Kaveri
- Thengai Srinivasan
- Manorama as Ganga
- Vijaya Girija as Yamuna
- Shabnam as Jasmine

== Soundtrack ==
The music was composed by Raghava Naidu and the lyrics were written by Veerapandian.

Songs	Singer	Length
"Kadhalikka Vanga" (Title Song)	Saroja	1:02
"Aa Aa Azhagae"	L. R. Eswari	4:06
"Unakkum Yenakkum"	T. M. Soundararajan	4:11
"Kadhal Endral Athu Then"	P. Susheela, Manorama	4:23
