= Engamma Sapatham =

1974 film by S. P. Muthuraman

- Directed by: S. P. Muthuraman
- Screenplay by: Panchu Arunachalam
- Story by: R. Selvaraj
- Produced by: S. Baskar
- Starring: R. Muthuraman; Sivakumar; Jayachitra; Vidhubala
- Cinematography: Babu
- Edited by: R. Vittal
- Music by: Vijaya Bhaskar
- Production company: Vijayabaskar Films
- Release date: 4 October 1974
- Running time: 128 minutes
- Country: India
- Language: Tamil

Engamma Sapatham (transl. My mother's vow) is a 1974 Indian Tamil-language comedy film, directed by S. P. Muthuraman. The film stars R. Muthuraman, Sivakumar, Jayachitra and Vidhubala. It was released on 4 October 1974. The film was remade in Telugu as Ammayila Sapatham (1975) and in Kannada as Vasantha Lakshmi (1978). The core plot of the 1994 Tamil film Vanaja Girija bore resemblance to the storyline of this film.

== Cast ==
- R. Muthuraman as Sundaram
- Sivakumar as Kumaran
- Jayachitra as Chithra
- Vidhubala as Geetha
- Major Sundarrajan in Guest appearance
- Thengai Srinivasan in Guest appearance
- Suruli Rajan
- Senthamarai
- Vennira Aadai Moorthy
- Usilai Mani
- Manorama
- M. N. Rajam in Guest appearance
- Sukumari
- S. A. Ashokan
- Vijaya Chandrika
- Shanti
- Master Sekhar

== Production ==
After Anbu Thangai, Muthuraman and Guhanathan were in search of a story for their next film. They listened to scripts from various screenwriters but none of them impressed them, they decided to approach Panchu Arunachalam who asked for two days time to complete the script. R. Selvaraj who was Arunachalam's assistant at that time suggested to handle revenge story in a lighter vein which impressed Arunachalam and wrote a screenplay which became Engamma Sapatham. The film began production in 5 April 1974 at Karpagam Studios. Sivaji Ganesan clapped the shot while A. C. Thirulokachandar switched on the camera.

== Soundtrack ==
The music was composed by Vijaya Bhaskar.

Song	Singers	Lyrics
"Ennaiya Mulikare"	L. R. Eswari	Panchu Arunachalam
"Anbu Megame" 1	Vani Jairam	Kannadasan
"Anbu Megame" 2	Vani Jairam, S. P. Balasubrahmanyam	Kannadasan
"Ilamai Azhaikindrathu"	T. M. Soundararajan, P. Susheela, Vani Jairam, S. P. Balasubrahmanyam	Panchu Arunachalam
"Unakkum Enakkum"	L. R. Anjali	Panchu Arunachalam

== Reception ==
Kanthan of Kalki called it a film whose story structure seems to have vowed to lower the quality of the film world.
