= Thanga Gopuram =

- Theatrical release poster
- Directed by: M. S. Solaimani
- Written by: M. S. Solaimani
- Produced by: P. L. Mohanram
- Starring: Jaishankar; Jayalalithaa
- Cinematography: Sundarababu
- Edited by: S. A. Murugesan
- Music by: S. M. Subbaiah Naidu
- Production company: Mohan Productions
- Release date: 12 August 1971
- Running time: 147 minutes
- Country: India
- Language: Tamil

Thanga Gopuram (transl. Golden Gopuram) is a 1971 Indian Tamil-language film produced, written and directed by M. S. Solaimalai. It stars Jaishankar and Jayalalithaa, with Sundarrajan, V. K. Ramasamy, M. R. R. Vasu, Srikanth, Vennira Aadai Nirmala, Srividya and Manorama in supporting roles. The film was released on 12 August 1971.

== Cast ==
- Jaishankar as Durai
- Jayalalithaa as Seetha and Herself (dual role) (Note: Jayalalithaa played both fictional and non-fictional roles in the film.)
- Sundarrajan as Sadha Sivam
- V. K. Ramasamy as Boothalingam
- M. R. R. Vasu as Nithiyantham
- Srikanth as Raja
- Krishna Rao as Mannaru
- Pakoda Kadhar as Alwar
- Karikol Raju as Mahalinga Pillai
- Vennira Aadai Nirmala as Malathi
- Srividya as Shanthi
- Manorama as Kamala
- Seethalakshmi as Boothalingam's wife

== Production ==
Jaishankar, who played Jayalalithaa's lover in several films, portrayed her brother for the second time after Gowri Kalyanam (1966).

== Soundtrack ==
The music was composed by S. M. Subbaiah Naidu, while the lyrics were written by Kannadasan, "Kavi" Rajagopal and Ra. Pazhanisamy.

Song	Singers	Length
"Muthu Tamil Maduraiyin"	P. Susheela, L. R. Anjali, Kousalya	02:57
"Vaarai Madammayile"	Manorama	02:01
"Maamalai Seithapillai"	P. Susheela, L. R. Eswari, L. R. Anjali	03:22
"Rajathi Rajathi"	L. R. Eswari	04:06
"Dhimkita Dhimkita"	S. V. Ponnusamy, Manorama	04:21
"Mukkanigal"	T. M. Soundararajan	02:02

== Reception ==
The film was critically acclaimed and commercially successful. In this film Jayalalithaa, also appears as the actress Jayalalithaa for a song in the film, both character reflects on her stardom as well as anticipates her transformation into a meta-object, and was regarded as classic film for her. She won the Tamil Nadu State Film Award for Best Actress.
