= Vairam =

- DVD cover
- Directed by: T. R. Ramanna
- Screenplay by: T. N. Balu
- Based on: Victoria No. 203 by K. A. Narayan
- Produced by: S. P. Laxmanan; M. Suriyanarayanan; S. S. Pazhaniyappan; M. N. Arunachalam
- Starring: Jaishankar; Jayalalithaa
- Cinematography: Amirtham
- Edited by: M. S. Mani
- Music by: T. R. Pappa
- Production company: Vijaya-Suri Combines
- Release date: 24 May 1974
- Running time: 148 minutes
- Country: India
- Language: Tamil

Vairam (transl. Diamond) is a 1974 Indian Tamil-language action spy film directed by T. R. Ramanna and written by T. K. Balu. The film stars Jaishankar and Jayalalithaa, with M. R. R. Vasu, S. A. Ashokan and R. S. Manohar in supporting roles. It is a remake of the 1972 Hindi film Victoria No. 203. The film was released on 24 May 1974, and became a box office hit.

== Plot ==
Senthil Nathan is a rich businessman, revered by his son Raja and society. In reality, he is the leader of a smuggling gang. As a trusted member of society. He gets all information, while his gang executes his plans. However, during one such robbery, a gang member turns greedy and flees with the diamonds. Senthil Nathan sends another man to retrieve the diamonds and kill the traitors. The traitor is killed, but the killer too flees with the diamonds. A furious Senthil Nathan sends some henchman to kill the traitor and retrieve the diamonds. The henchman corners and kills the traitor, but later has succeeded in hiding the diamonds somewhere. Meanwhile, a Victoria driver of the eponymous, Victoria, who was found near the dead body is arrested based on circumstantial evidence.

Elsewhere, two old golden-hearted crooks, Durai and Sami are to be released. Durai had an infant son who was kidnapped from a park. To date, Durai doesn't know who kidnapped him or whether his son is even alive. The duo wants to spend the rest of their lives as good, respected men. The plan is short-lived when they find themselves on the trail of the diamonds. Soon they learn about the Victoria and realise that no one has got a scent of the missing diamonds. To get closer to the Victoria, they pose as distant cousins of the Victoria driver, who are reluctantly admitted inside by the driver's elder daughter Rani, who soon starts acting suspiciously. During the day, Rani rides the Victoria, posing as a man.

She slips out of the home. One day Durai and Sami follow her to the house of a man unknown to them, Senthil Nathan and a henchman named Victor. They are shocked to see Rani seducing him. But when Victor tries to rape her, the duo saves her. On accosting her, she says that the man was loitering suspiciously near the Victoria when her father was arrested. Before they can learn anything from him. he is shot dead. On learning the Victoria drivers' story, the duo decides to do a good turn. They tell Rani the whole truth, but a shocked Rani doesn't have a clue about the location of the diamonds. Even after tearing the Victoria apart, nothing is found. Meanwhile, Rani falls in love with Raja. Whom she met while posing as a cab driver. she tries to woo him posing as a rich lady. A plan which works well.

However, Raja learns the truth and decides to marry her. Despite knowing about her father. Raja also meets Durai and Sami, whereupon he gets suspicious of the duo. Here Senthil Nathan objects to Raja's relationship with Rani. Later, Raja learns of his father's true nature and leaves him. After meeting Rani, Durai and Sami tell the truth to him too. The quartet decides to find the diamonds. Senthil Nathan kidnaps Rani on learning that she is the daughter of Shankaralingam, the Victoria driver. Later, Raja, Durai and Sami are also kidnapped and tortured. During the deal, Senthil Nathan's drinks are being served on an ornate tray with a fake Victoria headlamp attached to it. Sami realises that the diamonds are hidden in the Victoria's lamp. He buys time for himself and his old buddy and they go to retrieve the diamonds. The duo turns up at Senthil Nathan's den, where they manage to create confusion by luring the gang members to the diamonds.

Senthil Nathan is embarrassed to see that not one member of his gang is loyal to him. During the melee, another twist occurs where an old henchman of Senthil Nathan reveals that Raja isn't Senthil Nathan's son. Senthil Nathan had ordered the henchman to steal somebody's child, because Senthil Nathan's father had threatened to disown him. Senthil Nathan could have prevented the situation only by proving that Senthil Nathan fathered the child. In the end, Senthil Nathan and his remaining cronies are arrested and Rani's father is set free. After being reunited with his son and his would be daughter-in-law, Durai decides to settle down. However, Sami decides that his destiny might have written something else for him and leaves. Soon Durai spots a Burka-clad woman who is actually Sami. Sami tells Durai that he will not let the latter spend the rest of his life without him. Durai relents and goes home with his friend.

== Cast ==
- Jaishankar as Raja
- Jayalalithaa as Rani
- Srikanth as Victor
- M. R. R. Vasu as Durai
- S. A. Ashokan as Samy
- R. S. Manohar as Senthilnathan
- S. V. Ramadoss as Kannaiyram
- C. R. Parthiban as Jambu
- Thengai Srinivasan as Vaithiyanathan, hospital ward boy
- S. V. Sahasranamam as Sankaralingam
- Oru Viral Krishna Rao as Lathiyadi Krishnan (Police Constable, Vani Brother)
- Sachu as Vani
- Karikol Raju as Marwadi
- Usilai Mani as a Hotel customer
- Loose Mohan as a Hotel customer
- Kallapetti Singaram
- K. K. Soundar as Inspector of police
- Shoba as Usha, Rani's younger Sister
- Jayakumari as Guest Role

== Production ==
The court scenes were shot at Saradha Studios. Suryanarayanan, one of the film's producers appeared as court judge in the film.

== Soundtrack ==
Music was composed by T. R. Pappa and lyrics were written by Kannadasan.

| No. | Title | Singer(s) | Length |
|---|---|---|---|
| 1. | "Iru Mangani Pol" | S. P. Balasubrahmanyam, Jayalalithaa | 03:13 |
| 2. | "Iruvu Muzhuthum" | M. R. Vijaya | 04:51 |
| 3. | "Parthen Oru Azhagi" | T. M. Soundararajan | 04:48 |
| 4. | "Thana kidachathaiya (Ithu Saavi)" | Kovai Soundararajan, S. P. Balasubrahmanyam |

== Reception ==
Kanthan of Kalki compared the film unfavourably to the original.

== Impact ==
Jayalalithaa's opponents in politics circulated a still from Vairam showing her as a cabaret dancer to tarnish her image.
