= En Magan (1974 film) =

1974 film by C. V. Rajendran

- Poster
- Directed by: C. V. Rajendran
- Screenplay by: A. L. Narayanan
- Story by: Sachin Bhowmick
- Produced by: K. Balaji
- Starring: Sivaji Ganesan; Manjula
- Cinematography: Masthan
- Edited by: B. Kanthasamy
- Music by: M. S. Viswanathan
- Production company: Sujatha Cine Arts
- Release date: 21 August 1974
- Running time: 140 minutes
- Country: India
- Language: Tamil

En Magan (transl. My Son) is a 1974 Indian Tamil-language action drama film directed by C. V. Rajendran. The film stars Sivaji Ganesan and Manjula, with K. Balaji, Major Sundarrajan, R. S. Manohar, V. S. Raghavan, V. K. Ramasamy and Manorama in supporting roles. It is a remake of the 1972 Hindi film Be-Imaan. The film was released on 21 August 1974, and became commercially successful.

== Premise ==
Raja and Radha love each other and want to get married. Her rich father, who opposes their alliance, seeks his influential police officer friend's help to persuade her to break up with Raja.

== Cast ==
- Sivaji Ganesan as Raja alias Rajarathnam and Eattu Ramaiya Devar
- Manjula as Radha
- K. Balaji as Jagadesh
- Major Sundarrajan as Jagannath
- R. S. Manohar as Baskar
- V. S. Raghavan as D.I.G. Ramnath
- V. K. Ramasamy as Erodareya
- Manorama as Namakalu
- Roja Ramani as Kamala
- Gandhimathi as Thangam
- T. K. Ramachandran as Jambu
- Harikrishnan as Selvam

== Production ==
The final length of the film was 4,138.00 metres (13,576.12 ft).

== Soundtrack ==
The music was composed by M. S. Viswanathan, with lyrics by Kannadasan.

Song	Singers	Length
"Neengal Athanai Perum"	T. M. Soundararajan	03:41
"Ponnukkenna Azhagu"	T. M. Soundararajan, P. Susheela	04:32
"Neengal Athanai Perum" (Sad)	T. M. Soundararajan	03:10
"Sollathe Sollathe"	L. R. Eswari	04:06
"Sone Pappidi"	T. M. Soundararajan, Kovai Sounderarajan	04:30

== Release and reception ==
En Magan was released on 21 August 1974, and became commercially successful. Kausikan of Kalki felt the title En Magan did not suit the story; instead Thirudan (thief) would have been better. He appreciated the performance of Ganesan in the father's role as majestic while also praising the cinematography and humour and concluded Ganesan's dual roles and Ramayya's character will attract his fans. Navamani called the story weak and lack of excitement in screenplay and felt Ramasamy and Manorama were underutilised but praised the acting, dialogues and cinematography.
