= Athaiya Mamiya =

1974 Indian film

- Title card
- Directed by: Chithralaya Gopu
- Screenplay by: Chithralaya Gopu
- Story by: Vijaya Ganesan
- Produced by: N. R. Amudha
- Starring: Jaishankar; Ushanandini
- Cinematography: K. S. Baskar Rao
- Edited by: N. M. Sankar
- Music by: M. S. Viswanathan
- Production company: Garuda Films
- Release date: 16 August 1974
- Running time: 178 minutes
- Country: India
- Language: Tamil

Athaiya Mamiya (transl. Aunt or Auntie?) is a 1974 Indian Tamil-language comedy film directed by Chithralaya Gopu, starring Jaishankar and Ushanandini. It was released on 16 August 1974.

== Plot ==
Shankar returns from abroad after completing his higher studies. His parents plan to marry him to one of their relative's daughters. A series of comic incidents ensue while they try to convince Shankar to marry. Things become serious when Shankar reveals to them that he has already met the love of his life, Usha, and married her. Angered by this, his father throws him out of his house and Usha joins Shankar to start a new life. How they succeed in establishing their life is the rest of the film.

== Cast ==
- Jaishankar as Shankar
- Ushanandini as Usha
- M. N. Rajam as Sumathi
- Manorama as Manju
- Vennira Aadai Moorthy as Panjabikesan
- Nagesh as Balu
- Sachu as Malathy
- Srikanth as Sarathi
- Gandhimathi as Kattankulathaan's wife
- Thengai Srinivasan as Kattankulathaan
- V. S. Raghavan as Sachinthandham
- Sukumari as Lakshmi
- M. Bhanumathi as Chandra

== Production ==
Gopu was approached by a Madras Tamil speaking woman Amudha Ganesan to make a film for them based on the script she wrote to which he agreed. She produced the film with the money earned from gambling.

== Soundtrack ==
The music was composed by M. S. Viswanathan and lyrics were written by Vaali.

| Title | Singer(s) | Length |
|---|---|---|
| Marandhe Pochu | S. P. Balasubrahmanyam, L. R. Eswari | 3:36 |
| Nan Petha Magane Nataraja | T. M. Soundararajan | 4:02 |
| Athaiya Mamiya Angaya Ingaya | P. Susheela, L. R. Eswari | 3:12 |

== Reception ==
S. V. S. of Kalki called it a good film for those who want to laugh and pass the time. Athaiya Mamiya ran in cinemas for 10 weeks.
