= Thirumangalyam =

- Poster
- Directed by: A. Vincent
- Dialogue by: A. L. Narayanan
- Story by: Yaddanapudi Sulochana Rani
- Produced by: D. Ramanaidu
- Starring: Jayalalithaa; R. Muthuraman
- Cinematography: A. Vincent
- Edited by: K. A. Marthandam
- Music by: M. S. Viswanathan
- Production companies: Vijaya & Suresh Combines
- Distributed by: Vijaya & Suresh Combines
- Release date: 12 January 1974
- Running time: 168 minutes
- Country: India
- Language: Tamil

Thirumangalyam (transl. Holy Thread) is a 1974 Indian Tamil-language film directed by A. Vincent. The film stars Jayalalithaa and Muthuraman, and was also the former's 100th film as an actress. It is a remake of the 1973 Telugu film Jeevana Tarangalu. The film was released on 12 January 1974.

== Cast ==
- Jayalalithaa as Seetha
- R. Muthuraman
- Sivakumar as Murali
- Major Sundarrajan
- Lakshmi as Lavanya
- Pandari Bai
- Nagesh
- Srikanth
- Sukumari
- Sachu
- K. C. Vijaya
- D. Ramanaidu
- V. S. Raghavan
- Senthamarai
- Baby Sridevi as Shanthi

== Production ==
The film began production on 20 September 1973 at Vauhini Studios. It was produced by Ramanaidu. His elder son D. Suresh Babu switched on the camera while his younger son Venkatesh clapped the film.

== Soundtrack ==
The music was composed by M. S. Viswanathan, with lyrics by Kannadasan.

Song	Singers
"Ulagam Oru Naal Pirandathu"	Jayalalithaa
"Yogam nalla yogam"	P. Susheela
"Ponnana Manam Engu"	P. Susheela, S. P. Balasubrahmanyam
"Thirumangalyam Kollum"	P. Susheela, Jayalalithaa
"Jananam oru vazhi"	T. M. Soundararajan
"Ulagam Namadhu Veedendru Sollungal"	L. R. Eswari, Saibaba

== Reception ==
Navamani praised the dialogues, cinematography, acting and noted the scenes come and go without any connection till the interval still Vincent directed the film with vigor and concluded calling Lakshmi's acting, Vincent's cinematography and Jayalalitha's 100th film as three knots fallen tightly. According to Sivakumar, the film failed as the concept proved to be unacceptable among Tamil audiences. Nonetheless, Jayalalithaa won the Tamil Nadu State Film Award for Best Actress.
