= List of Marathi films of 1974 =

A list of films produced by the Marathi language film industry based in Maharashtra in the year 1974.

== 1974 Releases ==
A list of Marathi films released in 1974.

| Year | Film | Director | Cast | Release Date | Producer | Notes | Source |
|---|---|---|---|---|---|---|---|
| 1974 | Sugandhi Katta | | Dr. Shreeram Lagoo, Sarla Yevlekar, Jayashree Gadkar | | | | |
| 1974 | Saubhagyakankshini | Subhash Khaire | Laxmikant Berde, Mohan Joshi, Aishwarya Narkar | | | | |
| 1974 | Bayanu Navre Sambhala | Dutta Keshav Kulkarni | | | | | |
| 1974 | Tevde Sodun Bola | Prabhakar Naik | | | | | |
| 1974 | Ashi Hi Sataryachi Tarah | Murlidhar Kapdi | | | | | |
| 1974 | Aunda Lagin Karayache | Krishna Patil | Ratnamala, Nargis Banu, Mala | | | | |
| 1974 | Kartiki | Datta Mane | | | | | |
| 1974 | Sakharam Binder | Arun Hornekar | Raj Chouhan, Bharti Ghete, Jitendra Ghete | | Everest Entertainment | Adaptation of Vijay Tendulkar's play Sakharam Binder | |
