= Thaai =

- Theatrical release poster
- Directed by: D. Yoganand
- Story by: M. S. Solaimalai
- Produced by: S. S. Prakash; S. Rajan
- Starring: Sivaji Ganesan; Jayalalithaa
- Cinematography: G. Vittal Rao
- Edited by: R. Vittal
- Music by: M. S. Viswanathan
- Production company: Babu Movies
- Release date: 7 March 1974
- Country: India
- Language: Tamil

Thaai (transl. Mother) is a 1974 Indian Tamil-language drama film, directed by D. Yoganand. The film stars Sivaji Ganesan, Jayalalithaa, Kumari Padmini and S. Varalakshmi. It was released on 7 March 1974.

== Plot ==
Samidurai, a habitual gambler had fled the country to Singapore with a wrong impression that he had accidentally murdered his pregnant wife Karpagam. With the help of his sister Mangalam and her husband, he changes his name to Duraisami and gets an employment. Soon his fortune changes as Duraisami gets lucky to inherit the wealth of his boss.

But, Karpagam had survived and is living in Vadipatti with Anandan, her son and Kaveri, a girl who is believed to be Anandan's sister. Anandan grows up into an unruly youngster, gambling with Minor Arunagiri, picking up quarrels with people and walking out of every job he gets due to one reason or the other. But he remains respectful to his mother and showers affection to his sister Kaveri. He is also in love with Sivakami, daughter of Chinnaiah Pillai, a good Samaritan who keeps helping Karpagam and her children.

Karpagam, with her hard earned savings purchases a piece of land for her son Anandan as he couldn't stick to any job. But, he continues his acquaintance with Minor Arunagiri until the latter in a drunken state attempts to outrage the modesty of Kaveri letting Anandan watch helplessly. In a fit of rage, Anandan breaks Minor Arunagiri's left hand after rescuing his sister from his devilish friend. Anandan repents for his mistakes and promises his mother to behave properly in the future.

In the meanwhile, Duraisami acquires huge plots of land in the village and Anandan is among the ten lessees, thanks to Chinnaiah Pillai. Anandan and Chinnaiah Pillai travel to Chennai to meet Duraisami and the estranged father and son meet for the first time without realizing their actual relationship. Duraisami still lives with his sister Mangalam and her son Kumar. Kumar, being a money-minded person attempts to tarnish the image of Anandan during his stay in Chennai only to get disappointed as Duraisami develops impeccable faith and affection for Anandan.

As harvest season approaches, Duraisami sends Karpagam and Kumar to Vadipatti, assuring to reach the village after a few days. Kumar, after reaching the village joins hands with Minor Arunagiri and plot against Anandan. Kumar conspires to marry Sivakami and convinces Minor Arunagiri to forego his fascination for the girl to which the greedy Minor Arunagiri agrees.

Eventually, Duraisami visits the village and evinces keen interest in the plot of land that Karpagam had bought for Anandan. Anandan politely refuses to sell the land citing sentimental reasons which Duraisami accepts and gives up the idea. However, Karpagam who hadn't seen Duraisami yet, develops a negative impression about Duraisami and vehemently refuses to accept Anandan's explanations.

Anandan learns of Kaveri's love affair with Shanmugam and with the help of Chinnaiah Pillai, arranges for their engagement. Kumar disrupts the groom family's procession and also steals the paddy cultivated from Anandan's land. A ferocious Anandan wishes to hack both Kumar and Minor Arunagiri but gets stopped by his beloved mother. Anandan vows not to hurt anyone anymore. Kumar, however continues his grudge against Anandan and injures him surrounded by Minor Arunagiri and his goons. Duraisami and Chinnaiah Pillai rush to the scene, rescue Anandan and escort him to his house where Karpagam is not present. Duraisami gives some hefty cash to Anandan for his sister's engagement and leaves. Karpagam after returning home is angry with Anandan for accepting cash from a stranger and Anandan decides to return the cash to Duraisami.

In the meanwhile, Duraisami orders Kumar and Mangalam to leave his house. Mangalam gets emotional and screams at her brother for being ungrateful to her for all the help she and her husband did after Duraisami had murdered his own wife. Kumar takes advantage of this secret, blackmails Duraisami and manages to create a rift between him and Anandan.

With Minor Arunagiri's help, Kumar visits Chinnaiah Pillai's house and proposes to marry Sivakami. Anandan disagrees with Sivakami's plan to elope and get married somewhere outside the village. Karpagam assures Sivakami that she would talk to Annapurani and convince her to allow Sivakami to marry Anandan. But, Annapurani stops Karpagam in the entrance as already Duraisamy and Mangalam are seated inside to finalise Kumar-Sivakami marriage. Mangalam watches Karpagam pleading with Annapurani and realizes that Duraisami's wife is still alive. Sivakami argues with Duraisami and explains to him her unwillingness to marry Kumar which the latter appreciates.

Duraisami decides not to succumb to Kumar's pressure anymore. Even though Mangalam explains to Kumar that Duraisami hasn't killed his wife as he believes, Kumar hatches a plan to kill his uncle with the help of Minor Arunagiri.

Anandan suspects that Duraisami is under siege decides to go to his house and seek clarifications. Duraisami shows Anandan a picture of Karpagam whom he still considers to be dead. Anandan explains that Karpagam is alive and she is his mother. Duraisami, briefly glad to know about Karpagam's well-being, raises doubts about Kaveri, because at the time of fleeing, Karpagam had conceived her first child, Anandan. An emotional Anandan reaches home, informs about Duraisami and asks her about Kaveri. With Duraisami overhearing from outside, Karpagam reveals that Kaveri is the daughter of her erstwhile neighbor friend who died in a road accident. Once doubts are clarified, Duraisami enters the house and the family reunites.

Minor Arunagiri kidnaps Sivakami and keeps her in captivity for Kumar. Anandan reaches the spot, rescues her after a fight. Duraisami resumes living with his wife, son and daughter.

== Cast ==
- Sivaji Ganesan as Ananthan
- Jayalalithaa as Sivakami
- Major Sundarrajan as Samidurai / Duraisamy
- S. Varalakshmi as Karpagam
- Kumari Padmini as Kaveri
- M. N. Nambiar as Kumar
- Sukumari as Mangalam
- V. K. Ramasamy as Chinnaiya Pillai
- C. K. Saraswathi as Annapoorani
- M. R. R. Vasu as Minor Arunagiri
- Manorama as Palakadu Pappamma
- Senthamarai as Mahalingam
- C. I. D. Sakunthala as Gulopjon

== Production ==
The song "Naan Paarthalum" was shot at AVM Studios.

== Soundtrack ==
The music was composed by M. S. Viswanathan, with lyrics by Kannadasan.

Song	Singers	Length
"Enga Mamanukkum Mamikkum"	P. Susheela	03:41
"Mangalam Kaappaal"	S. Varalakshmi	04:32
"Chinna Kutti Azhaga"	L. R. Eswari, T. M. Soundararajan	4:51
"Naan Pathalum Pathean"	T. M. Soundararajan	5:06
"Nadala Vantharau"	T. M. Soundararajan, P. Susheela	4:26

== Reception ==
Navamani praised the acting, dialogues, music and also praised Yoganand's direction for directing the old plot in an watchable manner.
