= Puthiya Manithan =

- Theatrical release poster
- Directed by: Thirumalai–Mahalingam
- Written by: A. L. Narayanan
- Produced by: Sundarlal Nahadha
- Starring: Jaishankar; Jayasudha
- Cinematography: Amirtham
- Music by: Shankar–Ganesh
- Production company: Nahadha
- Distributed by: Murali Enterprises
- Release date: 13 December 1974
- Country: India
- Language: Tamil

Puthiya Manithan (transl. New human) is a 1974 Indian Tamil-language film directed by Thirumalai–Mahalingam and written by A. S. Narayanan. The film stars Jaishankar and Jayasudha, with V. K. Ramasamy, Gemini Chandra, R. S. Manohar and T. K. Bhagavathi in supporting roles. It was released on 13 December 1974.

== Cast ==
- Jaishankar
- Jayasudha
- V. K. Ramasamy
- Gemini Chandra
- R. S. Manohar
- T. K. Bhagavathi

== Soundtrack ==
The music was composed by Shankar–Ganesh, with lyrics by Vaali.

Track listing
No.	Title	Singer(s)	Length
1.	"Naan Solla Vanthen"	S. P. Balasubrahmanyam, Vani Jairam
2.	"Vanakkam Solli"	Vani Jairam, Chorus
3.	"Aaadaa Barase Mera Salaam"	Vani Jairam
4.	"Vetri Yaarukku Paarppoma"	Kovai Soundararajan, K. Veeramani, B. S. Sasirekha, L. R. Anjali
5.	"Vaigundam Sree Vaingundam"	Kovai Soundararajan, Thangappan

== Reception ==
Navamani praised the acting of star cast and Amirtham's cinematography and concluded saying Thirumalai–Mahalingam have directed the film briskly with entertaining elements. Kanthan of Kalki praised the acting of star cast and found Narayanan's dialogues as okay but panned the plot and concluded despite dragging the film with fights and cabaret dances, Thirumalai–Mahalingam's direction goes without problem.
