= Kai Niraya Kasu =

- Home video cover
- Directed by: A. B. Raj
- Screenplay by: Moulee
- Story by: Dharmaraj
- Produced by: Minnal; Shanmugam
- Starring: Nagesh; Prameela
- Cinematography: Dutt
- Edited by: R. Bhaskar
- Music by: Shankar–Ganesh
- Production company: Arunodaya
- Release date: 8 March 1974
- Running time: 145 minutes
- Country: India
- Language: Tamil

Kai Niraya Kasu (/kaɪ nɪraɪjə kɑːsu/ transl. A Handful of Money) is a 1974 Indian Tamil-language comedy drama film directed by A. B. Raj and written by Moulee, from a story by Dharmaraj. The film stars Nagesh and Prameela, with M. R. R. Vasu, Thengai Srinivasan, Srikanth, Moulee, Master Rajkumar, A. Sakunthala, Sachu, L. Kanchana and S. N. Lakshmi in supporting roles. It was released on 8 March 1974.

== Cast ==
- Nagesh in a dual role
- Prameela
- M. R. R. Vasu
- Thengai Srinivasan
- Srikanth
- Moulee
- Master Rajkumar
- A. Sakunthala
- Sachu
- L. Kanchana
- S. N. Lakshmi
- Baby Sumathi
- Baby Sheela
- Jayakumari

== Production ==
The film began production in late September 1973 at Mysore Premier Studio.

== Soundtrack ==
The music was composed by Shankar–Ganesh. Lyrics were written by Kannadasan.

Track listing
No.	Title	Singer(s)	Length
1.	"Kai Niraya Kasu"	T. M. Soundararajan
2.	"Kaalam En Pakkam"	L. R. Eswari, P. Susheela
3.	"Dei Vaada Raja"	P. Susheela, S. P. Balasubrahmanyam
4.	"Kallil Ooriya"	L. R. Eswari, T. M. Soundararajan
5.	"Panthiyile"	L. R. Eswari

== Reception ==
Kanthan of Kalki praised the performances of the cast, dialogues but found the cinematography average and also felt the story which starts off differently starts to travel on the usual railway track after the interval.

== Legacy ==
In 2023, Harshini S V of Film Companion named Kai Niraya Kasu as one of Nagesh's best performances in a leading role, especially a "hilariously staged action sequence at a crucial point in the film".
