= Unnaithan Thambi =

- Theatrical release poster
- Directed by: R. Vittal
- Written by: Panchu Arunachalam
- Starring: Jaishankar; Jayachitra
- Cinematography: Dutt
- Edited by: N. Damodaran; R. Vittal
- Music by: Vijaya Bhaskar
- Production company: Geetha Chitra
- Release date: 30 August 1974
- Running time: 145 minutes
- Country: India
- Language: Tamil

Unnaithan Thambi (transl. You only, brother) is a 1974 Indian Tamil-language film directed and co-edited by R. Vittal, and written by Panchu Arunachalam. The film stars Jaishankar and Jayachitra, with Ashokan, Srikanth, Thengai Srinivasan and Vennira Aadai Moorthy in supporting roles. It was released on 30 August 1974. The film's storyline was later adapted for Raja Chinna Roja (1989), also written by Arunachalam.

== Plot ==
Jaishankar is the caretaker in a household managed by Ashokan. After Ashokan loses his vision, Jaishankar manages things in the household, and exposes the treachery of Ashokan's brother-in-law.

== Cast ==
- Jaishankar as the caretaker
- Jayachitra
- Ashokan as the head of the household
- Srikanth
- Thengai Srinivasan
- Vennira Aadai Moorthy
- Raghu
- Master Ramu
- V. S. Raghavan (guest appearance)
- Manorama
- C. I. D. Sakunthala
- Shanthi
- Baby Sumathi
- Oru Viral Krishna Rao
- Junior Balaiah

== Production ==
Unnaithan Thambi was originally planned as a different film with A. V. M. Rajan which was shelved. Another film with same title was later launched by a different production company with Jaishankar began production at Vauhini Studios in April 1974.

== Themes ==
The film has several dialogues which Sridhar Swaminathan, writing for Hindu Tamil Thisai, feels were in support of M. G. Ramachandran.

== Soundtrack ==
The music was composed by Vijaya Bhaskar, with lyrics by Kannadasan.

Track listing
No.	Title	Singer(s)	Length
1.	"Unakku Naan"	S. P. Balasubrahmanyam, Vani Jairam
2.	"Sivappu Chinnamma"	L. R. Eswari
3.	"Mani Vilakke"	S. P. Balasubrahmanyam, Vasantha
4.	"Chinna Chinna"	Latha, T. M. Soundararajan

== Release and reception ==
Unnaithan Thambi was released on 30 August 1974. Kanthan of Kalki praised the acting of Jaishankar and other actors and added the makers tried to say something innovative in the screenplay and called R. Vittal's direction having force but felt the music was non-sticky.
