= Srikanth (actor, born 1940) =

Indian actor (1940–2021)

- Born: Raja Venkatraman; 19 March 1940; Erode, British Raj
- Died: 12 October 2021 (aged 81); Chennai, Tamil Nadu, India
- Occupation: Actor
- Years active: 1965–2009
- Children: 1

Srikanth (19 March 1940 – 12 October 2021) was an Indian actor who worked in around 200 Tamil films. He was also referred to as Vennira Aadai Srikanth. He played the lead hero in around 50 films between 1965 and 1979 and also played supporting roles in films with actors Sivaji Ganesan, Muthuraman, Ravichandran and Jaishankar in the lead roles. From the late 1970s to the early 1990s, he appeared as a villain opposite actors including Sivakumar, Rajinikanth and Kamal Haasan.

== Film career ==
Srikanth was employed in the American Consulate before his career in the film industry. Srikanth was given his break as the lead hero by C. V. Sridhar with the film Vennira Aadai in 1965. He used to act in various dramas staged by troupes between 1960 and 1965. His birth name was Venkatraman, however, he performed the character of Srikanth in Major Chandrakanth, a drama directed in 1962, due to which he gained popularity in drama circles. Later this same name was adopted while he entered into films. Srikanth along with Vietnam Veedu Sundaram, Nagesh, Vaali and Vennira Aadai Moorthy used to stay at the area near T. Nagar Club House near the Shiva Vishnu Temple. N. C. Chakravarthy, who was an assistant director to C. V. Sridhar, was a regular Table Tennis player at the T. Nagar Club House and approached Srikanth to give auditions at Chitralaya studios for the new Tamil film Vennira Aadai. The film Vennira Aadai introduced 4 new faces to Tamil Cinema including that of Srikanth, who were Jayalalithaa, Vennira Aadai Nirmala and Vennira Aadai Moorthy. He was the first male actor in Tamil films to act as lead hero opposite Jayalalithaa. Later in 1965, Srikanth acted in Naanal, directed by K. Balachandar. He received his first negative role in the film Selva Magal in 1967. The image of a romantic hero which he acquired in his debut film, was used by him in only a few films in his career. Aiming for versatility, he accepted supporting roles in various films. He was in directorial ventures of K. Balachandar, like Bama Vijayam, Poova Thalaiya, Ethir Neechal, Navagraham and Nootrukku Nooru. He played the role of a mental patient in Raja Veetu Pillai, cast opposite Pushpalata. He played the hen-pecked husband who is son of the character played by Shivaji Ganesan in the film Vietnam Veedu. He has acted with Sivaji Ganesan in other films like Praptham, Gnana Oli, Vasantha Maligai, Rajapart Rangadurai, Sivagamiyin Selvan, Vani Rani, Thanga Pathakkam, Anbai Thedi, Rojavin Raja, Avan Oru Sarithiram, Ilaya Thalaimurai and Raja Rishi.

After success of the film Selva Magal in 1967, directors started approaching him for even villain roles and some of his successful films in villainous roles since 1968 include Thanga Gopuram, Gnana Oli, Gomatha Engal Kulamatha, Vairam, Vasantha Maligai, Anbu Thangai and Vani Rani. Despite the success in films, he and Sowcar Janaki were part of drama troupes giving live performances in the evening or on weekends.

He was part of many comedy films throughout his career like Ethir Neechal, Bama Vijayam, Yaarukku Mappilai Yaro, Kasethan Kadavulada, Kasi Yathirai, Kai Naraya Kaasu, Athaiya Mamiya and Ilaya Thalaimurai. He played the false son of P. Bhanumathi in the film Edupa Kai Pillai in 1975.

In 1972, Srikanth played a villain in Aval, directed by A. C. Trilogchandar in which Sasi Kumar played as the protagonist and this altered his career by him choosing to play negative roles in the future. In Thanga Pathakkam, Srikanth was cast as Jagan, the rebellious son of S. P. Choudhry, played by Sivaji Ganesan. The movie was adapted from a stage-play in which Sivaji Ganesan had previously starred as S. P. Choudhry. In the original stage-play, Jagan kills his father. In Thanga Pathakkam S. P. Choudhry instead kills his son Jagan. His role in Thanga Pathakkam is considered among his best performances. The film boosted his popularity as a villain, after acclaimed acting alongside Sivaji Ganesan.

But, at the peak of his career as the villain, Srikanth surprised critics and audience alike by returning to romantic image in the 1974 film Raja Nagam, with the song "Devam Vedhamum" gaining immense popularity. In the 1974 Tamil film Dikkatra Parvathi, which won the National Film Award for Best Feature Film in Tamil in 1975, Srikanth starred in the lead role. Jaishankar and Srikanth did many films together in the seventies as the producer-directors liked their combination. Together they did films including Ponuvandu, Idhayam Parakiradhu, Unnaithan Thambi, Pinju Manam and Palabishegam. Srikanth received the Tamil Nadu State Film Award for Best Actor for his performance in the film Karunai Ullam.

Srikanth has performed alongside other actors including Gemini Ganesan, Jaishankar and R. Muthuraman during his career. He also worked with his juniors Kamal Haasan, Sivakumar and Rajinikanth after 1977, with himself as the main villain like in films Pennai Solli Kutrram Illai, Sadhurangam, Bairavi, Sattam En Kayil, Neeya, Uyaranthvangal, etc. Srikanth has worked under the directions of A. C. Thirulogachander, K. Balachander, Muktha Srinivasan, C. V. Sridhar and A. Bhimsingh.

Srikanth was part of Jayalalithaa's film career right from her first Tamil film, Vennira Aadai in 1965 to her last Tamil film Nadhiyai Thedi Vandha Kadal in 1980. He played her brother in the 100th film of Jayalalithaa – Thirumangalyam. He played her step-son in Thanga Gopuram. He also played supporting roles in films with Jayalalithaa in lead roles including Jesus, Vairam, Anbu Thangai, Anbai Thedi and Kanavan Manaivi.His role in Mounam Sammadham (1989) was appreciated. He acted in dramas in 1970s to 1980s with Sowcar Janaki, Muthuraman, Lakshmi and later even in 1990s with next generation. He also starred in a weekly television series called Mangai opposite K. R. Vijaya in 1998 and later he did serial Akshaya, which was broadcast on Sun TV.

== Personal life ==
He died on 12 October 2021 at the age of 81. His daughter name is Meera.

== Filmography ==
Year	Film	Role	Notes
1965	Vennira Aadai	Dr. Chandru	
1965	Naanal	Murali	
1967	Selva Magal	Mohan	
1967	Aalayam	Raja	Guest appearance
1967	Bama Vijayam	Suresh	
1968	Ethirneechal	Kittu	
1969	Poova? Thalaiya?	Nagamma's son	
1969	Mahesh		Guest appearance
1970	Navagraham	Eshwaran	
1970	Vietnam Veedu	Sridhar	
1971	Nootrukku Nooru	Inspector Raja	
1971	Thanga Gopuram	Raja	
1971	Annai Velankanni	Dr.Antony	
1971	Praptham	Ramu / Thiyagarajan	
1972	Kadhalikka Vanga	Rajesh	
1972	Kasethan Kadavulada	Mali	
1972	Gnana Oli	Baskar	
1972	Deivam	Swaminathan	
1972	Vasantha Maligai	Latha's Elder Brother	
1972	Aval	Sadanandh	
1973	Kattila Thottila	Advocate.Raja	
1973	Ponvandu	Picchandi	Guest appearance
1973	Komatha En Kulamatha	Arun	
1973	Rajapart Rangadurai	Baskar	
1973	Jesus	Goat Rider	Malayalam film
1973	Kasi Yathirai	Ramu	
1973	Kuzhandaigal		
1973	Engal Thai		
1973	School Master		
1974	Vani Rani	Gopal	
1974	Rajanagam	Rajan	
1974	Athaiya Mamiya	Sarathy	
1974	Dikkatra Parvathi	Karuppan	
1974	Devi Sri Karumariyamman		
1974	Anbai Thedi	Suresh	
1974	Paruva Kaalam	Gangadharan	
1974	Vellikizhamai Viratham	Manager Ashok	
1974	Anbu Thangai	Sriram	
1974	Kai Niraya Kaasu	Baskar	
1974	Vairam	Victor	
1974	Thanga Pathakkam	Jagan	
1974	Thagam		
1974	Thirumangalyam	Chandru, James	Dual roles
1974	Sivakamiyin Selvan	Ravi	
1975	Vaazhnthu Kaattugiren	Baskar	
1975	Aayirathil Oruthi	Sathish	
1975	Anaya Vilakku		
1975	Eduppar Kai Pillai	Madhan	
1975	Karotti Kannan		
1975	Yarukku Mappillai Yaaro		
1976	Vazhvu En Pakkam	Kannan	
1976	Maharasi Vazhga	Villain	
1976	Rojavin Raja	Thiyagu	
1976	Oru Kodiyil Iru Malargal		
1976	Kanavan Manaivi	Ravi	
1976	Payanam	Babu	
1976	Perum Pugazhum		
1976	Annakili		
1976	Sila Nerangalil Sila Manithargal	Prabhu	
1977	Palabishegam	Muthiyah	
1977	Avan Oru Sarithiram	Muthu	
1977	Odi Vilaiyaadu Thatha		
1977	Pennai Solli Kutramillai		
1977	Uyarnthavargal		
1977	Ilaya Thalaimurai	Vasu	
1978	Vattathukkul Chaduram	Karthik	
1978	Agni Pravesam		
1978	Oru Veedu Oru Ulagam		
1978	Per Solla Oru Pillai		
1978	Savalige Savaal		Kannada film
1978	Bairavi	Rajalingam	
1978	Chittu Kuruvi		
1978	Sadhurangam	Ram Kumar	
1978	Shri Kanchi Kamakshi		
1978	Oru Nadigal Nadagam Parkiral	Ranga	
1978	Sattam En Kaiyil	Advocate	
1978	Iraivan Kodutha Varam	Ramu	
1978	Karunai Ullam		
1978	Tripura Sundari		
1979	Neeya?	Stephan	
1979	Lakshmi	Minor	
1979	Kandhar Alangaram	Subramaniyam	
1979	Inikkum Ilamai		
1979	Maria My Darling		
1980	Engal Vathiyaar		
1980	Muzhu Nilavu		
1980	Nathiyai Thedi Vandha Kadal	Doctor	
1980	Orey Muththam		
1981	Enga Ooru Kannagi		
1981	Rusi		
1982	Nizhal Thedum Nenjangal		Uncredited role
1983	Oppantham	Kanthan	
1984	Thambikku Entha Ooru		
1984	Kuzhandai Yesu		
1984	Antha Uravokku Satchi		
1985	Navagraha Nayagi	The King	
1985	Annai Bhoomi	Vijayakumar	
1985	Puthiya Theerpu		
1987	Sirai Paravai		
1987	Poo Mazhai Pozhiyuthu	Doctor	
1987	Mupperum Deviyar		
1988	Solla Thudikuthu Manasu		
1988	Malare Kurinji Malare		
1989	Kai Veesamma Kai Veesu		
1989	Dharmam Vellum		
1989	Namma Bhoomi		Kannada film
1990	Puriyada Pudir	Venkatraman	Uncredited role
1991	Anbu Sangili	Devanesan	
1992	David Uncle	Anthony	
1996	Karuppu Roja	King	
2000	Bharathi	Brahmin	
2003	Kaadhal Kondein	Divya's Father	
2009	Kudiyarasu	Ram	

== Television ==
Year	Title	Role	Channel
1998	Mangai		Sun TV
1998	Askhaya		Sun TV
1998–1999	Kudumbam		Sun TV
