= Aalayam (film) =

- Poster
- Directed by: Thirumalai–Mahalingam
- Screenplay by: A. Bhimsingh
- Based on: Nenje Nee Vaazhga by Pilahari
- Starring: Major Sundarrajan; Nagesh; Srikanth; V. K. Ramasamy
- Cinematography: G. Vittalrao
- Edited by: A. Pauldurai Singam
- Music by: T. K. Ramamoorthy
- Production company: Sunbeam
- Distributed by: Sri Venkateswara Cinetone
- Release date: 11 August 1967
- Running time: 169 minutes
- Country: India
- Language: Tamil

Aalayam (transl. Temple) is a 1967 Indian Tamil-language drama film directed by the duo Thirumalai–Mahalingam and written by A. Bhimsingh. Based on the play Nenje Nee Vaazhga (transl. Oh heart, live long!) by Pilahari, it stars Major Sundarrajan, with Nagesh, Srikanth and V. K. Ramasamy playing supporting roles.

The film happens in one day, largely in an office and revolves around the theme of human values of honesty and integrity. The soundtrack was composed by T. K. Ramamoorthy. The film's cinematography was handled by Vittalrao, while A. Pauldurai Singam handled the editing. The film was released on 11 August 1967, and won the National Film Award for Best Feature Film in Tamil.

== Plot ==
Ramalingam is an honest, principled man, working as a clerk in a company. He values integrity and discipline as the doctrines of daily life. But his honesty is put to test when his son-in-law Raghu comes to him with a big problem. Raghu has misplaced some money in the bank in which he works, and he requests Ramalingam to give him money so that he could make good the loss. Ramalingam expresses his inability to raise such an amount at short notice. At that instant, a businessman approaches Ramalingam with a bribe of ₹5,000 (equivalent to ₹290,000 or US$3,000 in 2026) to get his work done. Ramalingam sends him away in a rage. His daughter Kamala and wife keep pressuring him to help Raghu. The inner conflicts that torture Ramalingam in that single day and the final decision that he makes form the rest of the film.

== Cast ==
- Major Sundarrajan as Ramalingam
- Nagesh as Simon
- C. Vasantha
- V. K. Ramasamy as Paramanandam
- Manorama
- A. Karunanidhi
- A. Veerappan
- P. K. Saraswathi
- Typist Gopu
- Pakoda Kadhar
- Srikanth as Raja (guest appearance)
- Cho (guest appearance)

== Production ==
Aalayam was an adaptation of the stage play Nenje Nee Vaazhga, written by S. Raman, who wrote under the pseudonym Pilahari. Major Sundarrajan played the role of a poor Brahmin clerk, a departure from the roles he was previously known for: zamindars or wealthy, assertive men. Gopu who did the character of typist in the play repeated his character in the film and went on to be known as Typist Gopu. The film's editing was by A. Paulduraisingam, cinematography by G. Vittal Rao and H. Shantaram handled art direction. The final length of the film was 3,880 metres (12,730 ft).

== Music ==
The soundtrack was composed by T. K. Ramamoorthy, with lyrics by Kannadasan.

| Song | Singers |
|---|---|
| "Koyil Enbathum Aalayame" | T. M. Soundararajan |
| "Paasam Thudithathamma" | T. M. Soundararajan |
| "Sivanai Thedi Bhakthargal Ponar" | T. M. Soundararajan |

== Release and reception ==
Aalayam was released on 11 August 1967. Kalki appreciated the film for Thirumalai–Mahalingam's direction, and absence of Tamil cinema clichés like duets. It won the National Film Award for Best Feature Film in Tamil, and the Tamil Nadu State Film Award for Best Film – Second Prize.

== Bibliography ==
- Cowie, Peter; Elley, Derek (1977). World Filmography: 1967. Fairleigh Dickinson Univ Press. ISBN 978-0-498-01565-6.
