= Anbu Thangai =

1974 film by S. P. Muthuraman

- Poster
- Directed by: S. P. Muthuraman
- Story by: V. C. Guhanathan
- Produced by: T. M. Govindan
- Starring: R. Muthuraman; Srikanth; Jayalalithaa
- Cinematography: Babu
- Edited by: R. Vittal
- Music by: K. V. Mahadevan
- Production company: Gowri Art Enterprises
- Release date: 30 August 1974
- Running time: 121 minutes
- Country: India
- Language: Tamil

Anbu Thangai (transl. Dear Sister) is a 1974 Indian Tamil-language film directed by S. P. Muthuraman, starring R. Muthuraman, Srikanth and Jayalalithaa. The film is a remake of the Telugu film Chelleli Kapuram. Kamal Haasan choreographed a song featuring Jayalalithaa and himself for the film.

== Plot ==
Ramu is a poet who is ignored because of his dark skin. His friend Sriram takes Ramu’s poems, publishes them as his own, and becomes successful. As the truth comes out, Ramu finally gets his work back and is recognised for it.

== Cast ==
- R. Muthuraman as Ramu
- Srikanth as Sriram
- Major Sundarrajan
- Ramadas
- K. A. Thangavelu
- Oru Viral Krishna Rao
- Usilai Mani
- Kamal Haasan as the Buddha (guest appearance)
- Jayalalithaa as Radha
- Jaya as Geetha
- Kumari Sachu
- A. Sakunthala

== Production ==
Govindan, who previously worked as publicity designer, expressed interest in producing a film with S. P. Muthuraman as director which eventually became Anbu Thangai. The film began production in early February 1973 and it was launched at AVM Studios on 3 February 1973. Guhanathan, who co-produced the film, wanted Muthuraman to direct the film; however Muthuraman felt if Jayalalithaa was not comfortable working with him she can choose another director. When Jayalalithaa learned that the film is being directed by Muthuraman who previously worked in Enga Mama as assistant director she agreed to the choice. Kamal Haasan, who was a dance assistant to K. Thangappan, made a cameo appearance as the Buddha in a song.

== Soundtrack ==
The music was composed by K. V. Mahadevan, marking his first collaboration with S. P. Muthuraman.

| Song | Singers |
|---|---|
| "Mannargal Vanagum" | P. Susheela |
| "Vaangadi Vaanga" | L. R. Eswari, P. Susheela |
| "Kozhiyum Kozhiyum" | P. Susheela |
| "Aadi Vaa Azhagurani" | T. M. Soundararajan |

== Release and reception ==
Anbu Thangai was released on 30 August 1974. A critic from Kalki praised the performances of the cast, Guhanathan's story and Muthuraman's direction and included it among the list of films on the bond between a brother and sister after Pasamalar. According to S. P. Muthuraman, despite the film's average response at the box office, the producer Govindan turned a profit.

== Bibliography ==
- Muthuraman, S. P. (2017) [2005]. AVM Thandha SPM (in Tamil) (3rd ed.). Vikatan. OCLC 607342391.
