= Vani Rani (film) =

1974 Indian Tamil film

- Theatrical release poster
- Directed by: Tapi Chanakya; C. V. Rajendran
- Screenplay by: Aaroor Dass (dialogues)
- Based on: Seeta Aur Geeta by Salim–Javed
- Produced by: B. Nagi Reddi; Chakrapani
- Starring: Sivaji Ganesan; Vanisri; R. Muthuraman
- Cinematography: T. M. Sundarababu
- Edited by: K. A. Marthandam; D. G. Jayaraman
- Music by: K. V. Mahadevan
- Production company: Vijaya Productions
- Release date: 14 April 1974
- Running time: 138 minutes
- Country: India
- Language: Tamil Eastman colour

Vani Rani is a 1974 Indian Tamil-language film, directed initially by Tapi Chanakya and completed by C. V. Rajendran. It was produced by B. Nagi Reddi and Chakrapani. It stars Sivaji Ganesan, Vanisri, and R. Muthuraman. It is a remake of the Hindi film Seeta Aur Geeta. The film was released on 12 April 1974.

== Plot ==
Vani, an orphan, is ill-treated by her aunt who seeks to usurp her wealth. When she runs away from home, her lookalike, Rani, enters the house and she teaches Vani's aunt a lesson.

== Cast ==
- Vanisri as Vani and Rani
- Sivaji Ganesan as Ranga
- R. Muthuraman as Dr. Ravi
- T. K. Bhagavathi as Ravi's father
- K. D. Santhanam as Ramanathan
- K. A. Thangavelu as Sabapathy
- C. K. Saraswathi as Nagaveni "Nagu"
- Srikanth as Gopal
- Senthamarai as Lawyer
- Nagesh in Guest appearance
- G. Varalakshmi as Vani's grandmother
- Gandhimathi as Rani's Guardian Mother
- Y. Vijaya as Sheela
- Master Sekhar as Kannan

== Production ==
Vani Rani is a remake of the Hindi film Seeta Aur Geeta. Nagireddy felt the film to be similar to his production Enga Veettu Pillai with the change of gender which prompted him to remake the film in Telugu and Tamil with Vanisri. The film was initially directed by Tapi Chanakya; due to his death partway through the shoot, he was replaced by C. V. Rajendran. Both Chanakya and Rajendran received director's credit.

== Soundtrack ==
The music was composed by K. V. Mahadevan, with lyrics by Kannadasan.

No.	Title	Singer(s)	Length
1.	"Kalamellam Parthathundu"	T. M. Soundararajan, P. Susheela
2.	"Boomiyil Thendral"	S. P. Balasubrahmanyam, P. Susheela
3.	"Mullaipoo Pallakku"	S. P. Balasubrahmanyam, P. Susheela
4.	"Parthu Po"	T. M. Soundararajan
5.	"Kathai Undu"	P. Susheela
6.	"Pon Olirum Pudhu Nilave"	T. M. Soundararajan, S. Janaki

== Reception ==
Kanthan of Kalki appreciated Aaroor Dass' dialogues and Sundarababu's cinematography. Navamani praised the dialogues, acting, music and direction.
