= M. R. R. Vasu =

Indian actor

- Born: Madras Rajagopalan Radhakrishnan Vasudevan Naidu; 29 May 1942; Trichy, Tamil Nadu
- Died: 21 March 1984 (aged 41); Chennai; Tamil Nadu, India
- Occupation: Actor
- Years active: 1962–1984
- Spouse: Lalitha
- Children: 4, including Vasu Vikram
- Parent(s): M. R. Radha (father); Saraswathi Ammal (mother)
- Relatives: Radha family

Madras Rajagopalan Radhakrishnan Vasudevan was an Indian actor who was active in Tamil cinema and theatre during the latter half of the 20th century. He was known for playing negative roles, but was also a successful character actor. He acted in over 75 movies in Tamil. He is the eldest son of actor M. R. Radha, father of Vasu Vikram and half-brother of Radha Ravi, Radhika and Nirosha.

== Filmography ==
Year	Title	Role(s)	Ref.
1962	Thayai Katha Thanayan		
1965	Paditha Manaivi		
1967	Sabash Thambi	Vasu	
1968	Chakkaram	Nayar	
1968	Edhir Neechal	Kumaresan	
1968	Naalum Therindhavan		
1969	Aayiram Poi	Ethiraj	
1969	Poova Thalaiya	Hotel Manager	
1970	Kaviya Thalaivi	Paranthaman	
1970	Kalam Vellum		
1970	Yaen?		
1970	Sorgam	Maatrubootham	
1971	Moondru Deivangal	Veerappan	
1971	Punnagai	Satya's friend	
1971	Thanga Gopuram		
1971	Then Kinnam	Kanakasabai's Assistant	
1971	Babu	Vatti Vadivel	
1971	Veettukku Oru Pillai	Sittrambalam	
1972	Avasara Kalyanam	Robbery Gang Leader	
1972	Enna Muthalali Sowkiyama		
1972	Gnana Oli	Nallasivam	
1972	Hello Partner		
1972	Kanna Nalama		
1972	Kasethan Kadavulada	insane Rama's father	
1972	Needhi	Nallakannu	
1972	Pattikada Pattanama	Moinar	
1972	Pillaiyo Pillai	Murugan	
1972	Rani Yaar Kuzhanthai		
1972	Thavapudhalavan		
1973	Bharatha Vilas	Narasimma Naidu	
1973	Kasi Yathirai	Mayandi	
1973	Maru Piravi		
1973	Nathaiyil Muthu		
1973	Ponnukku Thanga Manasu		
1973	Pookkaari		
1973	Suryagandhi		
1974	Avalum Penn Thaane		
1974	Engal Kula Deivam		
1974	Kai Niraya Kaasu		
1974	Samaiyalkaran		
1974	Thaai	Moinar Arunagiri	
1974	Ungal Viruppam	Seethapathy	
1974	Vairam	Durai	
1975	Avandhan Manidhan	Paramasivam	
1975	Dasavatharam	Ayangirivan	
1975	Dr. Siva		
1975	Eduppaar Kaippillai	Rajalingam	
1975	Enakkoru Magan Pirappan		
1975	Manidhanum Dheivamagalam	Dharmalingam	
1975	Puthu Vellam		
1975	Paattum Bharathamum	Kuduvancherry Kuppusamy	
1975	Avalukku Aayiram Kangal		
1975	Hotel Sorgam		
1976	Gruhapravesam		
1976	Malaimegam	Mama	
1977	Nallathukku Kaalamillai		
1977	Ilaya Thalaimurai		
1978	Ilayarani Rajalakshmi		
1978	Thyagam		
1978	Ennai Pol Oruvan	Namachivayam	
1978	Rudra Thandavam	Maarappan	
1978	Sri Kanchi Kamatchi		
1978	Vanakkatukuriya Kathaliye		
1979	Naan Vazhavaippen		
1979	Nallathoru Kudumbam		
1979	Yamanukku Yaman		
1980	Jamboo		
1980	Naan Potta Savaal	Arthanari	
1982	Thanikattu Raja		
1984	Kuzhandhai Yesu		
