= Major Sundarrajan =

Indian actor

- Sundarrajan in Major Chandrakanth (1966)
- Born: Srinivasan Sundarrajan; 17 March 1935; Periyakulam, Theni
- Died: 28 February 2003 (aged 67); Chennai, Tamil Nadu, India
- Occupations: Actor, film director
- Years active: 1962–2003
- Works: Full list
- Spouse: Shyamala
- Children: Gowtham

Srinivasan Sundarrajan (17 March 1935 – 28 February 2003), popularly known as Major Sundarrajan, was an Indian actor and film director who worked predominantly in Tamil language films and plays. He was well known for his sophisticated and urbane way of delivering dialogues, often mixing English and Tamil sentences.

== Early life ==
Sundarrajan was born on 17 March 1935 into a middle-class family in Periyakulam, Theni. His father Srinivasa Iyengar was a stage actor. Sundarrajan's first stint with acting came when he was in the sixth grade; at this point he was cast in a Hindi play of his school. He went on to act in numerous school and college plays. After graduating with a degree in science, Sundarrajan went to Madras (now Chennai), where his uncle Veeraraghavan was an amateur actor in the Triplicane Fine Arts theatre troupe. Sundarrajan played minor roles in this troupe's plays, and simultaneously managed a full-time career at Madras Telephones.

== Career ==
Sundarrajan began his career in film with a supporting role in Vaijayanthimala, directed by Sundar Rao Natkarni which never saw a theatrical release; his debut film instead became K. Somu's Pattinathar (1962), where he portrayed a Chola king. Sundarrajan subsequently received opportunities to act in the plays of K. Balachander, most notably Major Chandrakanth, where he portrayed the title character. The play propelled Sundarrajan to fame, and was adapted into a 1966 feature film with Sundarrajan reprising the role; his performance received widespread acclaim. After this he became popularly known as "Major" Sundarrajan, with the prefix having first been given to him by the magazine Pesum Padam. Sundarrajan went on to appear in over 900 films and continued to act in plays, eventually launching his own theatre troupe. Later, he started acting in television shows.

== Image ==
Sundararajan was well known for his sophisticated and urbane way of delivering dialogues, often mixing English and Tamil sentences. In most of his early films he would play wealthy and assertive characters, such as zamindars, an exception being Aalayam (1967), where he played a poor Brahmin clerk.

== Personal life and death ==
Sundarrajan was married to Shyamala, with whom he had a son named Gowtham. Apart from acting, he was also a skilled gourmet cook. Born into a Brahmin family, Sundarrajan was initially an atheist, but became a believer later in his life. Sundarrajan died on 28 February 2003 at Chennai.
