= Jaishankar filmography =

This is the filmography of Indian actor Jaishankar, who performed roles ranging from hero to villain. He was credited on screen with the title of Makkal Kalaignar Jaishankar or Makkal Tamilan in most of his films, sometimes referred to as Thennagathu James Bond (South Indian James Bond). In the era dominated by Sivaji Ganesan, M. G. Ramachandran, Gemini Ganesan and Ravichandran, he created his own niche with portrayals of westernised characters.

Jaishankar made his film debut in 1965, in the film Iravum Pagalum, directed by Joseph Thaliath Jr. The film was released on 14 January 1965 on Thai Pongal day. Despite facing competition from Enga Veettu Pillai and Pazhani, released on the same day, the film become a commercial success. He generally starred in romance, comedy and action films (especially as detective). In the following year he acted in Enga Veettu Penn (1965), Panchavarna Kili, where he played in a dual role, and the film become a commercial success. Jaishankar starred in Kuzhandaiyum Deivamum (1965), where he played a divorced husband, an adaptation of Disney's The Parent Trap, directed by Krishnan–Panju, produced by AVM Productions. It was a commercial success and won the National Film Award for Best Feature Film in Tamil, and in Nee, he played a college student, pairing with Jayalalithaa for the first time, which become a commercial success. In 1966, he acted in the Psychological thriller film Yaar Nee?, produced by P. S. Veerappa, it was remake of the Hindi film Woh Kaun Thi? (1964). The film became successful at the box office. In 1967, he acted in the romantic-comic fantasy film Pattanathil Bhootham, starring with K. R. Vijaya, the film was heavily inspired by the 1964 American film The Brass Bottle, the film was directed by M. V. Raman, and the film was released on Tamil Puthandu. Despite facing competition from Magaraasi, released on same day, it become a major commercial success. In 1969, he acted in a comedy film Poova Thalaiya, where he played the role of a successful son-in-law, who will compete with an arrogant aunt. The film was a box office success, running for 100 days in many centers of Tamil Nadu and also all over India. In the same year he gives another major success; Akka Thangai, he played a suspected brother and the film was directed by M. A. Thirumugam. The film was huge hit at the box office and won the Tamil Nadu Film Award for Best Film (Second Prize). He starred in Mannippu, where he played an artist and falsely charged his finance missing case, it becomes a successful at the box office and the film was remake of Malayalam film Padunna Puzha.

In Maanavan (1970), he played a young man who becomes a district administrator from the poverty level. Maanavan proved a commercial success. In 1970 he acted comedy film Veettuku Veedu, based on the play Thikku Theriyadha Veettil and later 2001 Viswanathan Ramamoorthy based on this film, it became a huge hit at the box office. He starred in Ethirkalam with Gemini Ganesan and he acted western-adventure film Kalam Vellum (1970), all the films became successful at the box office. In Nootrukku Nooru (1971), he played a college professor, who is accused by three college girls of sexual harassment, the film was directed by K. Balachander under his production Kalakendra. It was one of the film milestones of Shankar's career and he won the Film Fans Association Best Actor Award in 1971.

Jaishankar worked under Modern Theatres film such as Iru Vallavargal (1966), Vallavan Oruvan (1966), Kadhalithal Podhuma (1967), Naangu Killadigal, Neelagiri Express (1968), CID Shankar, Karundhel Kannayiram (1972), Thedi Vandha Lakshmi (1973).

Between 1980 and 1999 Jaishankar emerged with latest actors like Rajinikanth, Kamal Haasan, Vijayakanth, Sathyaraj, Thiagarajan, Mohan, Prabhu, Arjun, Vijay and played lead villain and in character role. In Murattu Kalai (1980), he reprised his villain role and co-starred with Rajinikanth. In Vidhi (1984), he played a rich criminal lawyer and father of playboy son, the film became a commercial success. In 1984, he acted in the thriller film 24 Mani Neram, where he played an investigator, the film was directed by Manivannan and in the same year he worked under Balu Mahendra's in Neengal Kettavai. In 1985, he played actress Nadhiya's father's role in Poove Poochooda Vaa, directed by Fazil. Later, he acted in horror-thriller films such as Yaar? and Pillai Nila (both released in 1985) and he played in the crime thriller film Saavi, in which he played a CID Inspector and solved a murder case. The film was based on American film Dial M for Murder. The film was a commercial hit at the box office. In the film Oomai Vizhigal (1986), he ran unprofitable Magazine Dhinamurasu, he was an editor of the magazine, the film was made by Film college students and ran over 100 days in theatres. In 1989, he acted in science fiction-horror film Naalai Manithan, in which he played a mad scientist who invents as drug which gives back life to the dead if injected within two hours of death, it became a profitable venture.

== Filmography ==
=== 1960s ===
| Year | Film | Role | Note(s) | Ref. |
|---|---|---|---|---|
| 1965 | Iravum Pagalum | Rajasekar | | |
| 1965 | Vilakketriyaval | | | |
| 1965 | Panchavarna Kili | Sekar/Balu | | |
| 1965 | Nee! | Sundaram | | |
| 1965 | Enga Veettu Penn | Narayanan | | |
| 1965 | Kuzhandaiyum Deivamum | Chandrasekar | | |
| 1966 | Iru Vallavargal | Rajan | | |
| 1966 | Yaar Nee? | Dr. Anand | | |
| 1966 | Naam Moovar | | | |
| 1966 | Kadhal Paduthum Paadu | Raju | | |
| 1966 | Gowri Kalyanam | Raju | | |
| 1966 | Vallavan Oruvan | CID Shankar | | |
| 1967 | Penne Nee Vaazhga | | | |
| 1967 | Sabash Thambi | Sekhar | | |
| 1967 | Pattanathil Bhootham | Bhaskar | | |
| 1967 | Raja Veetu Pillai | Raja | | |
| 1967 | Bhavani | Chinna Durai | | |
| 1967 | Uyir Mel Aasai | | | |
| 1967 | Selva Magal | Sekhar | | |
| 1967 | Ponnana Vazhvu | | | |
| 1967 | Muhurtha Naal | Raju | | |
| 1967 | Kadhalithal Podhuma | Ravi | | |
| 1967 | Naan Yaar Theriyuma | | | |
| 1968 | Anbu Vazhi | | | |
| 1968 | Thanga Valayal | | | |
| 1968 | Neelagiri Express | CID Inspector Shankar | | |
| 1968 | Teacheramma | Somu | | |
| 1968 | Deiveega Uravu | | | |
| 1968 | Bommalattam | Sukumar | | |
| 1968 | Puthisaligal | | | |
| 1968 | Nervazhi | Balu | | |
| 1968 | Paal Manam | | | |
| 1968 | Muthu Chippi | Prabha | | |
| 1968 | Jeevanamsam | Moorthi | | |
| 1968 | Uyira Maanama | | | |
| 1968 | Siritha Mugam | | | |
| 1969 | Anbalippu | Raja | | |
| 1969 | Akka Thangai | Shankar | | |
| 1969 | Nil Gavani Kadhali | CID Shankar | | |
| 1969 | Poova Thalaiya | Shankar | | |
| 1969 | Aayiram Poi | Ravi | | |
| 1969 | Magane Nee Vazhga | | | |
| 1969 | Pennai Vazha Vidungal | Anand | | |
| 1969 | Kanni Penn | Inspector Sundaram | | |
| 1969 | Naangu Killadigal | Anandan (a) Kumar | | |
| 1969 | Ponnu Mappillai | Ramesh | | |
| 1969 | Manasatchi | | | |
| 1969 | Athai Magal | Sekar | | |
| 1969 | Mannippu | Gopi | | |

=== 1970s ===
| Year | Film | Role | Note(s) | Ref. |
|---|---|---|---|---|
| 1970 | Penn Deivam | Police Inspector | | |
| 1970 | Ethirkalam | Rathinam | | |
| 1970 | CID Shankar | CID Shankar | | |
| 1970 | Veettuku Veedu | Vasudevan | | |
| 1970 | Maanavan | Kathiresan | | |
| 1970 | Kadhal Jothi | | | |
| 1970 | Kalam Vellum | Velu | | |
| 1970 | Kannan Varuvan | | | |
| 1970 | Nilave Nee Satchi | Mohan | | |
| 1971 | Pudhiya Vazhkai | Shankar | | |
| 1971 | Naangu Suvargal | Raja | | |
| 1971 | Nootrukku Nooru | Professor Prakash | | |
| 1971 | Kulama Gunama | Raja | | |
| 1971 | Veettukku Oru Pillai | Mohan | | |
| 1971 | Thanga Gopuram | Durai | | |
| 1971 | Anbukkor Annan | | | |
| 1971 | Needhi Dhevan | | | |
| 1971 | Kettikaran | CID Raju / Babu | | |
| 1971 | Soodhattam | | | |
| 1972 | Ganga | Ganga | | |
| 1972 | Rani Yaar Kuzhanthai | Shankar | | |
| 1972 | Kadhalikka Vanga | Tamil Arasu | | |
| 1972 | Nawab Naarkali | Ravi | | |
| 1972 | Karunthel Kannayiram | Ashok; Arun | | |
| 1972 | Thaikku Oru Pillai | | | |
| 1972 | Kanimuthu Paappa | Raja | | |
| 1972 | Avasara Kalyanam | Sekar | | |
| 1972 | Delhi To Madras | Agent Ramu | | |
| 1972 | Savalukku Savaal | | | |
| 1972 | Varaverpu | | | |
| 1972 | Jakkamma | Jambu | | |
| 1972 | Unakkum Enakkum | | | |
| 1972 | Ashirvadham | | | |
| 1972 | Mappillai Azhaippu | Anand | | |
| 1972 | Ponmagal Vandhal | | | |
| 1973 | Vaayadi | | | |
| 1973 | Vijaya | | | |
| 1973 | Arangetram | Jaishankar | Guest Appearance | |
| 1973 | Vandhaale Magaraasi | Dr. Sundaram | | |
| 1973 | Thalai Prasavam | | | |
| 1973 | Amman Arul | Shankar | | |
| 1973 | Anbu Sagodharargal | Prem | | |
| 1973 | Thedi Vandha Lakshmi | Inspector Mohan Kumar / Ramesh / Kannan | | |
| 1973 | Iraivan Irukkindran | | | |
| 1973 | Ponvandu | Kannan | | |
| 1973 | Vakkuruthi | Narendran | | |
| 1973 | Deiva Kuzhandhaigal | | | |
| 1974 | Kalyanamam Kalyanam | Muthu | | |
| 1974 | Pillai Selvam | | | |
| 1974 | Idhayam Parkiradhu | | 100th Film | |
| 1974 | Thanga Valayal | | | |
| 1974 | Thirudi | | | |
| 1974 | Vairam | Raja | | |
| 1974 | Ungal Viruppam | | | |
| 1974 | Prayachittham | Raju | | |
| 1974 | Athaiya Mamiya | Shankar | | |
| 1974 | Unnaithan Thambi | | | |
| 1974 | Akkarai Pachai | | | |
| 1974 | Kaliyuga Kannan | Krishnan | | |
| 1974 | Pandhattam | Ashok | | |
| 1975 | Enga Pattan Sothu | | | |
| 1975 | Hotel Sorgam | | | |
| 1975 | Cinema Paithiyam | Jaishankar | | |
| 1975 | Yarukku Maappillai Yaro | Seetharaman | | |
| 1975 | Pinju Manam | | | |
| 1975 | Sondhangal Vazhga | | | |
| 1975 | Thottathellam Ponnagum | | | |
| 1975 | Apoorva Raagangal | Jaishankar | Guest Appearance | |
| 1975 | Unga Veettu Kalyanam | | | |
| 1975 | Eduppar Kai Pillai | | | |
| 1975 | Thai Veetu Seedhanam | | | |
| 1975 | Avalukku Aayiram Kangal | | | |
| 1976 | Ore Thanthai | | | |
| 1976 | Thunive Thunai | CID Anand | 125th Film | |
| 1976 | Nee Oru Maharani | | | |
| 1976 | Mayor Meenakshi | | | |
| 1976 | Oru Kodiyil Iru Malargal | | | |
| 1976 | Panakkara Penn | Raja | | |
| 1976 | Mittai Mummy | | | |
| 1977 | Andru Sinthiya Ratham | | | |
| 1977 | Uyarnthavargal | | Guest Appearance | |
| 1977 | Sonthamadi Nee Enakku | | | |
| 1977 | Rasi Nalla Rasi | | | |
| 1977 | Avar Enakke Sontham | | | |
| 1977 | Maamiyar Veedu | | | |
| 1977 | Palabishegham | Kumaran | | |
| 1977 | Oruvanukku Oruthi | | | |
| 1977 | Gaslight Mangamma | | | |
| 1977 | Rowdy Rakkamma | | | |
| 1977 | Aasai Manaivi | | | |
| 1977 | Kalamadi Kalam | | | |
| 1977 | Gaayathri | Ganesh | | |
| 1977 | Chakravarthy | | | |
| 1977 | Nallathukku Kalamillai | | | |
| 1978 | Aval Oru Adhisayam | | | |
| 1978 | Vazha Ninaithal Vazhalam | | | |
| 1978 | Ganga Yamuna Kaveri | | | |
| 1978 | Mudi Sooda Mannan | Vikraman | | |
| 1978 | Ithu Eppadi Irukku | Ganesh | | |
| 1978 | Makkal Kural | | | |
| 1978 | Ilaya Rani Rajalakshmi | | | |
| 1978 | Taxi Driver | | 150th Film | |
| 1978 | Ullathil Kuzhanthaiyadi | | | |
| 1978 | Sakka Podu Podu Raja | Raja | | |
| 1978 | Vandikaran Magan | | | |
| 1978 | Rajavuketha Rani | | | |
| 1978 | Panchamirdham | | | |
| 1978 | Mela Thalangal | | | |
| 1979 | Nenjukku Needhi | | | |
| 1979 | Mayandi | | | |
| 1979 | Naan Oru Kai Paarkiren | | | |
| 1979 | Kadamai Nenjam | | | |
| 1979 | Kuzhandhaiyai Thedi | | | |
| 1979 | Kamasasthiram | | | |
| 1979 | Aadu Pambe | | | |
| 1979 | Dhairya Lakshmi | | | |
| 1979 | Kizhakkum Merkum Sandhikkindrana | | | |
| 1979 | Ore Vaanam Ore Bhoomi | Shankar | | |
| 1979 | Mahalakshmi | | | |

=== 1980s ===
| Year | Film | Role | Notes | Ref(s) |
|---|---|---|---|---|
| 1980 | Jamboo | Jambu | | |
| 1980 | Kaalam Badhil Sollum | | 175th Film | |
| 1980 | Saranam Ayyappa | CID Shankar | Guest Appearance | |
| 1980 | Murattu Kaalai | Pannaiyar | | |
| 1981 | Kanni Theevu | Pandiyan | | |
| 1981 | Savaal | Shankar | | |
| 1981 | Garjanai | Parasuram | | |
| 1981 | Kulakozhundhu | | | |
| 1981 | Anjatha Nenjangal | Chinnadurai | | |
| 1981 | Keezh Vaanam Sivakkum | Kumaran | | |
| 1981 | Needhi Pizhaithathu | | | |
| 1981 | Ellam Inba Mayyam | Kailasa Mudaliyar | | |
| 1982 | Vazhvey Maayam | Shankar | | |
| 1982 | Pattanathu Rajakkal | | | |
| 1982 | Thanikattu Raja | Ethiraj | | |
| 1982 | Auto Raja | Ramu | | |
| 1982 | Theerpu | Govindan | | |
| 1982 | Kelviyum Naane Pathilum Naane | Rajagopal | Guest appearance | |
| 1982 | Om Shakti | | Guest Appearance | |
| 1982 | Thaai Mookaambikai | Kannappan | | |
| 1982 | Nandri, Meendum Varuga | | | |
| 1982 | Asthivaram | | | |
| 1982 | Oru Varisu Uruvagiradhu | | | |
| 1982 | Adhisayappiravigal | Inspector | | |
| 1983 | Ennai Paar En Azhagai Paar | | | |
| 1983 | Paayum Puli | Ranjith | | |
| 1983 | Uruvangal Maralam | God | Guest Appearance | |
| 1983 | Kai Varisai | | 200th Film | |
| 1983 | Kann Sivanthaal Mann Sivakkum | Vairam | | |
| 1983 | Bhookambam | Sethu Varman | Malayalam film | |
| 1983 | Thudikkum Karangal | Ramesh | | |
| 1983 | Thai Veedu | Anand | | |
| 1983 | Thambathigal | | | |
| 1983 | Sattam | Ramesh | | |
| 1983 | Adutha Varisu | Jamindhar | Guest Appearance | |
| 1983 | Indru Nee Nalai Naan | Marudhachalam | | |
| 1983 | Malaiyoor Mambattiyan | DSP Ranjith | | |
| 1983 | Apoorva Sahodarigal | | | |
| 1983 | Thanga Magan | Rajalingam | | |
| 1984 | Amma Irukka | | | |
| 1984 | Thiruppam | | | |
| 1984 | Vidhi | "Tiger" Dayanidhi | | |
| 1984 | Idhu Enga Boomi | | Guest Appearance | |
| 1984 | Vengaiyin Mainthan | | | |
| 1984 | Sattathai Thiruthungal | | | |
| 1984 | Vaazhkai | David | Guest Appearance | |
| 1984 | Vellai Pura Ondru | | | |
| 1984 | Sarithira Nayagan | | Guest Appearance | |
| 1984 | Neengal Kettavai | Muthulingam | | |
| 1984 | Alaya Deepam | | | |
| 1984 | Veetuku Oru Kannagi | Inspector Chandrasekhar | Guest Appearance | |
| 1984 | 24 Mani Neram | Vijay | | |
| 1984 | Anbulla Rajinikanth | Jaishankar | Guest Appearance | |
| 1984 | Ezhuthatha Sattangal | Justice Thiyagarajan | | |
| 1984 | Naalai Unathu Naal | Devadas | | |
| 1984 | Iru Medhaigal | Chandrasekar | Guest Appearance | |
| 1984 | Kudumbam | Shankar | | |
| 1984 | Kadamai | | | |
| 1985 | Aandavan Sothu | | 225th Film | |
| 1985 | Bandham | Raheem | | |
| 1985 | Mookkanan Kaiyiru | | | |
| 1985 | Anni | | | |
| 1985 | Sivappu Nila | | | |
| 1985 | Nermai | Jaikumar | | |
| 1985 | Poove Poochooda Vaa | Sundaram | | |
| 1985 | Veli | | | |
| 1985 | Engal Kural | Raja, Thyagu and Shanthi's father | Guest Appearance | |
| 1985 | Anthasthu | Sanjeevi | | |
| 1985 | Yaar? | Rajaram | | |
| 1985 | Arthamulla Aasaigal | Customs Inspector Ganesh | | |
| 1985 | Avan | Chakravarthy | | |
| 1985 | Neethiyin Marupakkam | | | |
| 1985 | Oonjaladum Uravugal | | 250th Film | |
| 1985 | Saaavi | CID Shankar | | |
| 1985 | Padikkadavan | Chakravarthy | | |
| 1985 | Samaya Purathale Satchi | | | |
| 1985 | Pillai Nila | David | | |
| 1986 | Meendum Pallavi | | | |
| 1986 | Marumagal | Dr. Shankar | | |
| 1986 | Rasigan Oru Rasigai | | | |
| 1986 | Kaithiyin Theerpu | | | |
| 1986 | Murattu Karangal | Kaali | | |
| 1986 | Naanum Oru Thozhilali | Sundar | | |
| 1986 | Dharmam | Saravanan | | |
| 1986 | Enakku Nane Needipathi | Inspector Devaraj | | |
| 1986 | Kanne Kaniyamuthe | | | |
| 1986 | Bathil Solval Bhadrakali | | | |
| 1986 | Oomai Vizhigal | Chandran | | |
| 1986 | Annai En Dheivam | J.K.J Durai | | |
| 1986 | Kodai Mazhai | | 275th Film | |
| 1986 | Kulirkaala Megangal | | | |
| 1986 | Maaveeran | Harry | | |
| 1987 | Kadhal Parisu | Kailash | | |
| 1987 | Solvadhellam Unmai | Jagan | | |
| 1987 | Kathai Kathayam Karanamam | | | |
| 1987 | Paruva Ragam | Ravi's father | | |
| 1987 | Veerapandiyan | CID Shankar | | |
| 1987 | Vairakkiyam | Annapoorni's husband | | |
| 1987 | Enga Ooru Pattukaran | Manjampetti | Guest Appearance | |
| 1987 | Oru Thayin Sabhatham | Thyagarajan | Guest Appearance | |
| 1987 | Vilangu | DIG Jayaraman | | |
| 1987 | Poove Ilam Poove | | | |
| 1987 | Cooliekkaran | Marthandan | | |
| 1987 | Evargal Indiyargal | Savitri's father | Guest Appearance | |
| 1987 | Anjatha Singam | Inspector Rajasekhar | | |
| 1987 | Ivargal Varungala Thoongal | | | |
| 1988 | Oorai Therinjikitten | Thangadurai | | |
| 1988 | En Jeevan Paduthu | | Guest Appearance | |
| 1988 | Rocky | | Telugu film | |
| 1988 | Thaai Paasam | | | |
| 1989 | Naalaiya Manithan | Doctor | | |
| 1989 | Thaai Naadu | Christopher | | |
| 1989 | Apoorva Sagodharargal | Sathyamoorthy | | |
| 1989 | Poruthathu Pothum | Police inspector David | | |
| 1989 | Ponmana Selvan | Mettupalayam Jameen | Guest Appearance | |
| 1989 | Dravidan | | | |
| 1989 | Mappillai | Rajarajeswari's Husband | | |
| 1989 | Pudhu Mappillai | | | |

=== 1990s ===
| Year | Film | Role | Note(s) | Ref. |
|---|---|---|---|---|
| 1990 | Pathimoonam Number Veedu | Dr. Murali | | |
| 1990 | Mounam Sammadham | Sundaram | 300th film | |
| 1990 | Palaivana Paravaigal | Sivaprakasam | | |
| 1990 | Amma Pillai | | | |
| 1991 | Vanakkam Vathiyare | Duraisingam | | . |
| 1991 | Kaaval Nilayam | DSP Ravi | | |
| 1991 | Sir... I Love You | Lalitha's father | | |
| 1991 | Thalapathi | Krishnamoorthy (Arjun's father) | | |
| 1992 | Kasthuri Manjal | | | |
| 1992 | Singaravelan | Retired IG Natesan | | |
| 1992 | Naalaya Seidhi | Dhakshinamoorthy | | |
| 1992 | Nadodi Pattukkaran | Sivathaya | | |
| 1993 | Mudhal Paadal | Madhu's father | | |
| 1993 | Minmini Poochigal | Thangaraj | | |
| 1993 | Gokulam | Gayatri's guardian | | |
| 1993 | Dhuruva Natchathiram | Raja | | |
| 1994 | Varavu Ettana Selavu Pathana | Valluvardasan | | |
| 1994 | Priyanka | Sriram | | |
| 1994 | Kanmani | Rajasekaran | | |
| 1994 | En Rajangam | Chief Minister | | |
| 1995 | Chithirai Thiruvizha | | | |
| 1995 | Vishnu | Thangadurai | | |
| 1995 | Chandralekha | Ibrahim | | |
| 1995 | Varraar Sandiyar | Sandiyar's father | | |
| 1996 | Subash | Subash's father | | |
| 1997 | Kaalamellam Kaathiruppen | Kannan's father | | |
| 1997 | Arunachalam | Aathikesavan | | |
| 1998 | Dharma | Dharma's father | | |
| 1999 | Chinna Raja | Raja and Dilip's father | | |
| 1999 | Poo Vaasam | | Filming in 1988; released in 1999 | |

== Television ==
| Year | Serial | Role | Note(s) | Ref. |
|---|---|---|---|---|
| 1998 | Kuppathu Sastrigal | | | |
