= Thanedaar =

1990 Indian film by Raj N. Sippy

- Theatrical release poster
- Directed by: Raj N. Sippy
- Written by: Vinay Shukla
- Based on: Anbukku Naan Adimai by R. Thyagarajan
- Produced by: Sanjay Roy; Sudhir Roy
- Starring: Jeetendra; Jaya Prada; Sanjay Dutt; Madhuri Dixit
- Cinematography: Anwar Siraj
- Edited by: Ashok Honda
- Music by: Bappi Lahri
- Production company: Shiva Arts International
- Release date: 14 December 1990
- Running time: 151 minutes
- Country: India
- Language: Hindi

Thanedaar (transl. Station House Officer) is a 1990 Indian Hindi-language action film, produced by Sanjay Roy and Sudhir Roy under the Shiva Arts International banner and directed by Raj N. Sippy. It stars Jeetendra, Jaya Prada, Sanjay Dutt, Madhuri Dixit with music composed by Bappi Lahiri. The film is perhaps best remembered for the song "Tamma Tamma Loge". It is a remake of the Tamil-Telugu bilingual film Anbukku Naan Adimai (1980).

== Plot ==
The film begins in Jaalkot village, where Thakur Ajgar Singh is the tyrant of the region. Inspector Jagdish Chandar strongly opposes his cruelty. Jagdish lives with his motherless children, Avinash and Brijesh (aka Birju).

Birju, on the other hand, has turned into a criminal under the tutelage of Lawrence and Peter. The duo gets him to commit crimes and live off the proceeds. They assign him a final task — to steal a jewel — soon after he is released from prison.

Meanwhile, Chanda — a victim of Ajgar — approaches Birju for help to destroy the tyrant. In turn, Birju recruits Chanda for the theft, but Chanda is apprehended.

Avinash gets himself transferred to Jaalkot.

Meanwhile, Lawrence and Peter betray Briju, but he evades them and runs away with the jewel.

One day, Sudha reaches the village with Bubbly, setting up a potential reveal, but Briju handles the situation. Soon, he realizes that Avinash is his brother over what happened on the train.

Eventually, he reforms Ajgar's henchmen, Sunny and Mangal, turning them into approvers. However, they are slaughtered. Undeterred, Briju continues to accumulate evidence against Ajgar.

Meanwhile, Sudha learns of what happened on the train and, outraged, seeks to kill Birju, but is stopped by the man in the veil.

He is revealed to be Avinash, who apparently survived the fall from the train. The brothers then join hands in exacting revenge on those who wronged them.

== Cast ==
- Jeetendra as Inspector Avinash Chandar
- Jaya Prada as Sudha Chandar
- Sanjay Dutt as Brijesh Chandar "Birju"
- Madhuri Dixit as Chanda
- Kiran Kumar as Thakur Ajgar Singh
- Goga Kapoor as Lawrence
- Tej Sapru as Peter
- Mahesh Anand as Mangal
- Satish Shah as Rangeele
- Kunickaa Sadanand as Munni
- Suresh Chatwal as Jailor Anand
- Sharat Saxena as Sunny
- Harish Patel as Constable Bechare
- Paintal as Constable Dukhiram
- Viju Khote as Constable Khushiram
- Dalip Tahil as Inspector Jagdish Chandar (special appearance)
- Sudha Chandran as Mrs. Chandar (special appearance)
- Vikas Anand as Vishnu
- Mahavir Shah as Arvind Kumar, Peter and Lawrence's henchman (special appearance)
- Gavin Packard as Saudagar (special appearance)
- Subbiraj as Police Commissioner Prithvi

== Soundtrack ==
The song "Tamma Tamma Loge" (or "Tamma Tamma"), by Anuradha Paudwal and Bappi Lahiri, is inspired by two songs from Mory Kanté's 1987 album Akwaba Beach - "Tama" and "Yé ké yé ké". It was recorded in a single day. The same Mory Kanté songs went onto serve as the basis of another popular hit "Jumma Chumma De De" from the 1991 film Hum.

Choreographed by Saroj Khan and picturised on Sanjay Dutt and Madhuri Dixit, the dance steps are similar to Michael Jackson's "Bad". Dutt had great difficulty performing the dance moves, especially a scene with chairs though he had spent almost a month training.

It was remade for the 2017 film Badrinath Ki Dulhania by Tanishk Bagchi and for the 2026 film Dhurandhar: The Revenge by Shashwat Sachdev.

All music is composed by Bappi Lahiri.

No.	Title	Lyrics	Singer(s)	Length
1.	"Tamma Tamma Loge"	Indeevar	Bappi Lahiri, Anuradha Paudwal	7:54
2.	"Jab Se Huee Hai Shaadi"	Raj Sippy, Sameer	Amit Kumar	8:20
3.	"Aur Bhala Kya Maangu Main Rab Se"	Anjaan	Pankaj Udhas, Lata Mangeshkar	7:33
4.	"Jeena Hai To Hans Ke Jiyo – 1"	Anjaan	Asha Bhosle, Amit Kumar	1:28
5.	"Jeena Hai To Hans Ke Jiyo – 2"	Anjaan	Asha Bhosle, Amit Kumar, Reema Lahiri	4:48
6.	"Jeena Hai To Hans Ke Jiyo – 3"	Anjaan	Asha Bhosle	2:54
7.	"Zulmi Saiyan Thanedaar"	Sameer	Asha Bhosle	5:19
8.	"Tamma Tamma (Instrumental)"		Instrumental	8:03
9.	"Pehli Pehli Baar Aisa Thanedaar Aaya"	Indeevar	Alka Yagnik, Amit Kumar	7:38
10.	"Kamaal Ho Gaya"	Sameer	Asha Bhosle	5:34
Total length:				59:22

== Reception ==
The film scored well at the box office grossing ₹10.25 crore. It was also the fourth highest-grossing film of the year 1990.
