= Anthasthu =

1985 film

- Theatrical release poster
- Directed by: R. Thyagarajan
- Screenplay by: Vietnam Veedu Sundaram
- Story by: Vietnam Veedu Sundaram
- Produced by: C. Dhandayudhapani
- Starring: Jaishankar; Lakshmi; Murali; Ilavarasi
- Cinematography: V. Ramamoorthy
- Edited by: M. G. Balu Rao
- Music by: Shankar–Ganesh
- Production company: Devar Films
- Release date: 14 January 1985
- Country: India
- Language: Tamil

Anthasthu (transl. Status) is a 1985 Indian Tamil-language masala film directed by R. Thyagarajan and produced by Devar Films. The film stars Jaishankar, Lakshmi, Murali and Ilavarasi. It was released on 14 January 1985.

== Plot ==
Archana is the managing director of her company and puts a lot of weight into perceived status and class distinctions. She also has very exacting standards for her employees and is very suspicious of people who are poor. Sanjeevi lives in one of the buildings owned by Archana and makes it a point to constantly undermine her plans. He also convinces Murali, a young man searching for a job, to work with him. Sanjeevi plots to bring together Murali and Archana's daughter Radha. After some initial obstacles, the two fall in love, much to Archana's displeasure. The young lovers soon come to learn the complicated history behind Archana and Sanjeevi as well as how they fit into this long-standing feud.

== Cast ==
- Jaishankar as Sanjeevi
- Lakshmi as Archana
- Murali as Murali
- Ilavarasi as Radha
- Goundamani as Devdas
- Kovai Sarala as Lakshmi
- Thengai Srinivasan as Sivaraman, Archana's Manager
- Radha Ravi as Madan
- Y. G. Mahendran
- V. Gopalakrishnan as Archana's father

== Soundtrack ==
The soundtrack was composed by Shankar–Ganesh Lyrics by Vaali.

Song	Singers
"Vaadi Aandalu"	Raj Sitharaman
"En Kanmani" (Oh Megame)	S. P. Balasubrahmanyam
"Netraiya Varaiyil"	S. P. Balasubrahmanyam, S. Janaki
"Aasai Ennai Viratta"	Raj Sitharaman
"Otrai Kilaithannil"	S. P. Balasubrahmanyam, S. Janaki

== Reception ==
Jayamanmadhan of Kalki wrote that after putting so much of effort, the masala has become too nauseating.
