= Apoorva Sahodarigal =

- Theatrical release poster
- Directed by: R. Thyagarajan
- Written by: Thooyavan (dialogues)
- Screenplay by: Vijaya Kaul
- Story by: Vijaya Kaul
- Produced by: C. Dhandayuthapani
- Starring: Karthik; Suresh; Radha; Suhasini; Urvashi
- Cinematography: V. Ramamoorthy
- Edited by: M. G. Balu Rao
- Music by: Bappi Lahiri
- Production company: Devar Films
- Release date: 4 November 1983
- Country: India
- Language: Tamil

Apoorva Sahodarigal (transl. Unique Sisters) is a 1983 Indian Tamil-language action film directed by R. Thyagarajan and produced by Devar Films. The film stars Karthik, Suresh, Radha, Suhasini and Urvashi. It was released on 4 November 1983, and became a success.

== Cast ==
- Karthik
- Suhasini
- Radha
- Urvashi
- Jaishankar
- K. R. Vijaya
- Vijayakumar
- Suresh
- Thengai Srinivasan
- Master Haja Sheriff
- Baby Shalini

== Soundtrack ==
The soundtrack was composed by Bappi Lahiri, with lyrics by Vaali. The disco song "My Name is Rosy" attained popularity.

Track listing
No.	Title	Singer(s)	Length
1.	"Ennai Yaarum"	S. P. Balasubrahmanyam, S. Janaki
2.	"Annai Ennum"	S. Janaki
3.	"Nallathukku"	S. P. Balasubrahmanyam, S. Janaki
4.	"Ondre Engal Jeevan"	S. P. Balasubrahmanyam, S. Janaki
5.	"My Name is Rosy"	S. P. Balasubrahmanyam, S. Janaki
6.	"Engenge Nee Thaan"	S. P. Balasubrahmanyam, S. Janaki

== Critical reception ==
Jayamanmadhan of Kalki wrote even if it is a tiny plot, they keep telling it without hesitation and the film ends quickly before we sit up straight. Balumani of Anna praised the acting, music and called it a film made for general audiences who love masala films.
