= Dharmam =

- Directed by: R. Thyagarajan
- Screenplay by: Devar Films Story Unit
- Story by: Vietnam Veedu Sundaram
- Produced by: C. Dhandayudhapani
- Starring: Sathyaraj; Saritha; Sudha Chandran
- Cinematography: V. Ramamoorthy
- Edited by: M. G. Balurao
- Music by: Usha Khanna
- Production company: Devar Films
- Release date: 4 July 1986
- Country: India
- Language: Tamil

Dharmam (transl. Dharma) is a 1986 Indian Tamil-language action drama film directed by R. Thyagarajan, starring Sathyaraj, Saritha and Sudha Chandran. The film was released on 4 July 1986.

== Plot ==
Karthik is in jail awaiting his final court hearing. He was arrested for killing his girlfriend Valli's father, Rajappa. He has been slowly setting up an elaborate escape plan in case he's convicted. Shortly before his final court hearing, three new prisoners are assigned to his prison cell. Sivaraj is the leader and the three have been arrested for smuggling. Karthik is forced to reveal his escape plan to them and they are on board. After his court hearing, he's sentenced to death. He returns to jail but is sent to a different cell and is left behind when his cellmates escape using his plan. The three men are pursued by the police and kidnap Collector Bhanu as a hostage. Superintendent of Police (SP) Saravanan is in charge of rescuing her and arranges for Karthik's execution to be delayed. He believes that Karthik can assist in finding the three escapees. Karthik agrees to help if Saravanan will assist in proving his innocence. To that end, he explains the circumstances around his arrest to the SP.

Valli and Karthik grew up together in their small village and were childhood friends. Her father was unhappy with their friendship as Karthik was the son of their family servant, Meenakshi. He insults Meenakshi and, as a precaution, Karthik is sent to study in the city by his mother. When he returns to his hometown as a civil engineer, he reconnects with Valli, and they fall in love. Karthik learns of Rajappa's corrupt building practices and threatens to report him. In retaliation, Rajappa beats Meenakshi when she's alone, and she died from her injuries. Karthik physically assaults Rajappa but does not harm him. That night, a mysterious figure murders Rajappa and all evidence points to Karthik. Valli testifies against him in court.

Convinced of Karthik's innocence, Saravanan vows to help Karthik once the three men are caught. They track down the hideout and Karthik rescues Bhanu. The police higher ups are not inclined to help Karthik and want the execution to happen as soon as possible. Outraged, Bhanu pretends Karthik kidnapped her in a ruse to buy him more time to prove his innocence. She attempts to assist him while Saravanan is now out to get his former friend. All three get pulled deeper into the net of Rajappa's murderer and the three escapees that are still free.

== Cast ==
- Sathyaraj as Karthik
- Saritha as Bhanu
- K. R. Vijaya
- Sudha Chandran as Valli
- Jaishankar as Saravanan
- Sivachandran as Sivaraj
- Senthamarai as Rajappa
- Kamala Kamesh as Meenakshi
- Sangili Murugan as Naganathan
- Thengai Srinivasan as Rajamalai

== Production ==
Some scenes were shot at Kalingarayar home in Pollachi. Filming ended in April 1986.

== Soundtrack ==
The soundtrack was composed by Hindi film composer Usha Khanna, in her Tamil debut. The lyrics for all songs were written by Vaali.

Track listing
No.	Title	Singer(s)	Length
1.	"Kannane Kannane Un Radhai"	S. Janaki
2.	"Kattukul Nikkumo Chittu Kuruvi"	S. P. Balasubrahmanyam
3.	"Malare Malare Mounam Enna"	S. Janaki
4.	"Kangale Kadhal Seithale Pavam"	S. Janaki, P. Susheela
5.	"Unnai Vidamatten Serum Neram"	S. Janaki
