= Veerapandiyan =

- Poster
- Directed by: Karthik Raghunath
- Written by: Durai
- Produced by: Durai
- Starring: Sivaji Ganesan; Vijayakanth; Radhika; Jaishankar
- Cinematography: Ashok Choudhri
- Edited by: S. A. Murugesh
- Music by: Shankar–Ganesh
- Production company: Prakash Pictures
- Release date: 14 April 1987
- Running time: 138 minutes
- Country: India
- Language: Tamil

Veerapandiyan (transl. Brave warrior) is a 1987 Indian Tamil-language masala film, directed by Karthik Raghunath and produced by Durai. The film stars Sivaji Ganesan, Vijayakanth, Radhika and Jaishankar. It was released on 14 April 1987.

== Plot ==
Ranjith devises a plan to steal the temple jewels worth Rs. 2 crore in the town of Manimangalam, collaborating with Nanjappa, a local resident and the temple's dharmakartha. The jewels are stored in the collectorate and only brought to the temple during the Chithra Pournami, after which they are returned to government custody. Pandiyan "Pandi", the village president, resides with his sister Meenatchi "Meena". He was previously engaged to Gowri but called off the wedding upon learning that his horoscope predicted his wife would die prematurely. Gowri, still devoted to Pandiyan, remains a significant part of his and Meenatchi's lives. Following the Chithra Pournami pooja, Ranjith intends to loot the jewels during their transit back to the collector's office. However, their attempt is foiled by Manimaaran, the son of Dharmalingam, the village landlord and Nanjappa's nephew. Nanjappa spreads false rumors about Manimaaran to his father, aiming to eliminate him and facilitate their future heist.

The trio is forced to wait until the next Chithra Pournami to steal. Meanwhile, Ranjith kidnaps an archaeological research officer responsible for discovering a subway path leading to the temple. The officer is later found dead, and the crucial palm leaf manuscript containing subway research goes missing, making Inspector Shankar investigate the murder, suspecting foul play. Shankar disguises himself as Postman Naidu and enters Manimangalam. Pandiyan has a long-standing feud with Dharmalingam, which Nanjappa and the Dharmakartha exacerbate by spreading misinformation about Pandiyan. Ranjith, disguised as a saint, enters the village, and Shankar identifies him but remains unaware of their plan to loot the jewels. Ranjith, with the dharmakartha's assistance, discovers the entrance to the hidden temple subway. Further exploration reveals that the underground subway terminates at the cremation site of Pandiyan's mother.

Ranjith disguised as a saint, requests that Pandiyan donate his land, but Pandiyan refuses. Meanwhile, Manimaaran foils an attempt by Dharmakartha's son-in-law to loot farm produce from the temple land and reports the incident to Pandiyan. Pandiyan orders public humiliation as punishment, infuriating Dharmakartha. After some initial comedic encounters, Meena develops feelings for Manimaaran. Nanjappa conspires to tarnish Pandiyan's reputation by orchestrating a false accusation of rape against him, using Sweety as the accuser. However, Postman Naidu, informs Manimaaran about the plot, and Gowri and Manimaaran intervene to resolve the issue. Undeterred, Nanjappa and his cohorts kidnap Meena, but Manimaaran rescues her after receiving information from Gowri. However, in the ensuing chaos, Pandiyan chops off Ranjith's hand without realizing his true identity. Shankar suspects that the severed hand belongs to Ranjith and orders a lab test to confirm.

Nanjappa informs Pandiyan about Meena's romantic relationship with Manimaaran, angering Pandiyan, who confronts Meena. Manimaaran's mother requests that her son marry Meena, and Pandiyan, moved by the request, agrees. However, Dharmalingam refuses to accept the union, prompting Manimaaran and Meena to get married regardless of his objections. Nanjappa exploits the conflict to his advantage, orchestrating an attack on Pandiyan and deceiving him into believing Dharmalingam was responsible. However, Pandiyan and Dharmalingam eventually reconcile, only for Nanjappa to devise a plan to kill Dharmalingam and frame Pandiyan for the crime. As planned, Nanjappa murders Dharmalingam and manipulates the situation to get Pandiyan arrested. Trusting Nanjappa's deceit, Manimaaran becomes enraged with Pandiyan and Meena. Meanwhile, Shankar's investigation reveals Nanjappa's culpability in Dharmalingam's murder. Pandiyan escapes from prison, and Manimaaran confronts him, believing he killed his father. However, Shankar intervenes, revealing the truth about Nanjappa's involvement. Manimaaran and Pandiyan reunite, determined to prevent Nanjappa's plan to steal the temple jewels.

On Chithra Pournami day, Ranjith, Nanjappa, and Dharmakartha attempt to loot the jewels. With the help of Kannaiya, Gowri, and Meena, Ranjith's henchmen are arrested outside the temple. Manimaaran thwarts Ranjith's escape plan, and a fierce battle ensues between Manimaaran, Pandiyan, Shankar, and Ranjith's henchmen. Finally, Nanjappa dies in a subway collapse, and Dharmakartha succumbs to a snake bite. Meanwhile, Gowri feigns fatal injuries, prompting Pandiyan to marry her in a heartfelt ceremony.

== Cast ==
- Sivaji Ganesan as Pandiyan "Paandi", Manimangalam village president
- Vijayakanth as Manimaaran "Mani"
- Radhika as Meenatchi "Meena"
- Sumithra as Gowri
- Ranjeet as Ranjith
- Radha Ravi as Nanjappa
- V. K. Ramasamy as Dharmakartha of Manimangalam temple
- V. S. Raghavan as Dharmalingam, Manimaaran's father
- Jaishankar as Inspector Shankar / Postman Naidu
- Kallapetti Singaram as Kannaayiram, Manimaaran's aide
- Ennatha Kannaiya as Kannaiya, Pandiyan's aide
- Pandari Bai as Manimaaran's mother
- S. N. Lakshmi as Paati
- Anuradha as Sweety
- Bindu Ghosh as a Village woman
- Bayilvan Ranganathan as a Villageman

== Soundtrack ==
The soundtrack was composed by Shankar–Ganesh.

Track listing
No.	Title	Lyrics	Singer(s)	Length
1.	"Chittu Kuruvi"	Vairamuthu	Malaysia Vasudevan, K. S. Chithra
2.	"Muthumani"	Vaali	Vani Jairam, K. S. Chithra
3.	"Andayila"	Vaali	Vani Jairam
4.	"Thavum Kiliye"	Vairamuthu	Malaysia Vasudevan, S. P. Sailaja
5.	"Malaiya"	Gangai Amaran	K. S. Chithra

== Reception ==
On 5 May 1987, The Indian Express wrote "Veerapandiyan despite being a potpourri of elements sacred and mandatory to the masala genre is within its rather constructed ambit, a fair sample of all that is good, bad, and mediocre in commercial Tamil cinema."
