= Anbukku Naan Adimai =

1980 film by R. Thyagarajan

- Poster of Tamil version
- Directed by: R. Thyagarajan
- Screenplay by: Thooyavan
- Story by: Syed; Jwalamuhi
- Produced by: C. Dhandayuthapani
- Starring: Rajinikanth; Rati; Vijayan (Tamil); Sreedhar (Telugu); Sujatha
- Cinematography: V. Ramamoorthy
- Edited by: M. G. Balu Rao
- Music by: Ilaiyaraaja
- Production company: Devar Films
- Release dates: 4 June 1980 (Tamil); 19 July 1980 (Telugu)
- Running time: 129 minutes
- Country: India
- Languages: Tamil; Telugu

Anbukku Naan Adimai (transl. I am a slave to love) is a 1980 Indian Tamil-language action drama film directed by R. Thyagarajan and produced under the Devar Films banner by C. Dhandayuthapani. It stars Rajinikanth, Rati, Vijayan, and Sujatha. The film was simultaneously made in Telugu as Mayadari Krishnudu (transl. Mischievous Krishna), with Sreedhar replacing Vijayan and a slightly different supporting cast. It was the third venture of Rajinikanth and Devar Films together and was a hit in the box office. It was remade in Hindi as Thanedaar (1990).

== Plot ==
Poster of the Telugu version

Vijayan (Sreedhar in Telugu), the Inspector and Gopinath (Krishna in Telugu), a thief, are brothers who were separated in childhood. When they meet in a strange situation, Vijayan is thrown out of the train and Gopinath lands in the village as the inspector and the events following is the story. Gowri, who performs a dance in the street, helps Gopinath and steals his heart.

== Cast ==
Cast (Tamil)	Cast (Telugu)	Role (Tamil)	Role (Telugu)
Rajinikanth		Gopinath	Krishna
Rati		Gowri	Gowri
Vijayan	Sreedhar	Gopinath's elder brother	Krishna's elder brother
Sujatha		Lakshmi	Lakshmi
'Karate' R. V. T. Mani	Satyanarayana	Nagappan	Sarva Rayudu
Nagesh		Sekhar	
Thengai Srinivasan	K. V. Chalam	Head Constable	Head Constable
Prabhakar		Velu	
A. Karunanidhi	Allu Ramalingaiah	Head Constable	Head Constable
Usilai Mani	K. K. Sharma	Police Constable	Police Constable
Master Haja Sheriff		Young Gopinath	Young Krishna
Ramaprabha		Gowri's sister	Gowri's sister
Jayamalini			

=== Tamil version ===
- Surulirajan as C.I.D. Kandhasamy
- S. A. Ashokan as D.C.P.
- Major Sundarrajan as Sundar
- V. Gopalakrishnan

=== Telugu version ===
- Mohan Babu
- Giri Babu as Sarva Rayudu's right hand
- Babji

== Production ==
A fight sequence involving a tiger was filmed at Yercaud in late 1977.

== Soundtrack ==
The music was composed by Ilaiyaraaja.

Tamil
No.	Title	Lyrics	Singer(s)	Length
1.	"Aadu Nanaiyuthenu"	Vaali	P. Susheela, Saradha	5:32
2.	"Kaaththodu Poovurasa"	Vaali	S. P. Balasubrahmanyam, P. Susheela	4:04
3.	"Kaattiloru Singakuttiyam"	Vaali	S. P. Balasubrahmanyam	3:11
4.	"Onrodu Onranaom"	Panchu Arunachalam	P. Susheela	3:19
5.	"Vayalooru Mayilaattam"	Vaali	P. Susheela	4:10
Total length:				20:16

All lyrics are written by Acharya Aatreya.

Telugu
No.	Title	Singer(s)	Length
1.	"Chengavi Panche Katti"	P. Susheela, S. P. Balasubrahmanyam	4:18
2.	"Gudivada Gummatam"	P. Susheela	4:12
3.	"Okaritho Okaruga"	P. Susheela	4:26
4.	"Vachchadu Maa Palleku"	P. Susheela	5:12
5.	"Anaganaga"	S. P. Balasubrahmanyam	4:24
Total length:			22:32

== Critical reception ==
Kanthan of Kalki praised Sujatha's performance, but felt Vijayan was underutilised. Ananda Vikatan wrote that whenever it is dull, Rajinikanth's charm makes us sit up straight. But, Billa is an MP. one can say, this film is just LLA. Naagai Dharuman of Anna praised the acting, music, stunts, cinematography and direction.
