= Annai Oru Aalayam =

1979 film by R. Thyagarajan

- Theatrical release poster in Tamil
- Directed by: R. Thyagarajan
- Written by: Thooyavan (dialogues)
- Story by: Sandow M. M. A. Chinnappa Devar
- Produced by: C. Dhandayudhapani
- Starring: Rajinikanth; Sripriya
- Cinematography: P. N. Sundaram
- Edited by: M. G. Balurao; P. Nandakumar Reddy
- Music by: Ilaiyaraaja
- Production company: Devar Films
- Release dates: 19 October 1979 (Tamil); 8 November 1979 (Telugu)
- Country: India
- Languages: Tamil; Telugu

Annai Oru Aalayam (transl. Mother is a Temple) is a 1979 Indian Tamil-language adventure film directed by R. Thyagarajan, and a remake of the Hindi film Maa. It was simultaneously shot in Telugu with the title Amma Evarikaina Amma (transl. Mother is mother for all). The film stars Rajinikanth as an animal hunter who helps a baby elephant to reach its mother. Annai Oru Aalayam was released on 19 October 1979 and became a commercial success.

== Plot ==
An animal hunter seeks to help a baby elephant reach its mother.

== Cast ==
Actor (Tamil)	Actor (Telugu)	Role (Tamil)	Role (Telugu)
Rajinikanth		Vijay	Vijay
Sripriya		Hema	Hema
Anjali Devi		Vijay's mother	Vijay's mother
Mohan Babu		Mohan	Mohan
Thengai Srinivasan	Allu Ramalingaiah	Gopalsamy	Gopalrao
S. A. Ashokan	K. V. Chalam	Hanumanthu	Alu
Suruli Rajan	Nagabhushanam	Mannar	Malu
Y. G. Mahendran		Drunkard	Drunkard
Jayamalini		fake Hema	fake Hema
Nagesh		Himself	Himself
Major Sundarrajan	Satyanarayana	Himself	Himself

== Production ==
The film prominently features two elephant actors: Ganesh, then a calf, and Rathi, an elder female. It was prominently shot at Sathya Studios, Madras. For the scene in which Rajinikanth's character carries a leopard on his shoulders, the actor refused to use a body double.

== Soundtrack ==
The music is composed by Ilaiyaraaja. The song "Amma Nee Sumandha" is set in Charukesi raga. The song "Appane Appane" is played frequently during festivals like Ganesh Chaturthi annually.

All lyrics are written by Vaali.

Tamil tracklist
No.	Title	Singer(s)	Length
1.	"Amma Nee Summandha Pillai"	T. M. Soundararajan	4:04
2.	"Appane Appane"	S. P. Balasubrahmanyam, P. Susheela	4:32
3.	"Nadhiyoram"	S. P. Balasubrahmanyam, P. Susheela	4:14
4.	"Malai Aruvi (Malayoram)"	S. P. Sailaja	3:48
5.	"Nilavu Neram"	P. Susheela	3:59
6.	"Nandhavanathil"	S. P. Balasubrahmanyam	4:10
Total length:			24:47

All lyrics are written by Acharya Aatreya.

Telugu tracklist
No.	Title	Singer(s)	Length
1.	"Amma Neevuleni Nenu"	S. P. Balasubrahmanyam	4:04
2.	"Appane Appane"	S. P. Balasubrahmanyam, P. Susheela	4:32
3.	"Nayaka Vinayaka"	S. P. Balasubrahmanyam, P. Susheela	4:14
4.	"Chinnamma Chittimama"	S. P. Sailaja	3:48
5.	"Prema Beram Teepi Neram"	P. Susheela	3:59
6.	"Gunnami Komma Medha"	S. P. Balasubrahmanyam	4:10
Total length:			24:47

== Reception ==
Ananda Vikatan rated the film 52 out of 100, appreciating the cinematography. The critic said the film faltered in the first half but did better in the second half with the arrival of the elephant calf.
