= Annai Bhoomi =

1985 film

- Theatrical release poster
- Directed by: R. Thyagarajan
- Written by: Vietnam Veedu Sundaram (dialogues)
- Produced by: C. Dhandayudhapani
- Starring: Vijayakanth; Radha Ravi; Nalini
- Cinematography: V. Ramamoorthy
- Edited by: M. G. Balurao
- Music by: Ilaiyaraaja
- Production company: Thevar Films
- Release date: 31 May 1985
- Running time: 100 minutes
- Country: India
- Language: Tamil

Annai Bhoomi (transl. Mother Earth) is a 1985 Indian Tamil-language action film directed by R. Thyagarajan and produced by Thevar Films. The film stars Vijayakanth, Radha Ravi and Nalini. It is the first 3D film in Tamil cinema. The film was released on 31 May 1985. It was remade in Kannada as Namma Bhoomi.

== Plot ==
Two friends Raja and Somu are hired to kill a General Prabhakar. They kidnap him but have a change of heart when they learn that he actually tried to help them.

== Cast ==
- Vijayakanth as Raja
- Radha Ravi as Somu
- Nalini as Nalini
- Goundamani as Ragappa
- Tiger Prabhakar as General Prabhakar
- Srikanth as Vijayakumar
- Thyagu as Shankar
- Baby Sonia as Uma
- Ilavarasi as Radha
- Thengai Srinivasan as sorcerer in song "Oh Julie"

== Soundtrack ==
The soundtrack was composed by Ilaiyaraaja, with lyrics by Vaali.

Track	Singers
"Oh Julie Julie Jolly"	S. Janaki, Dr. Grubb Singh, Chorus
"Puthakathai"	Malaysia Vasudevan, S. Janaki
"Raththiri Raththiri"	S. P. Balasubrahmanyam, S. Janaki

== Critical reception ==
Jayamanmadhan of Kalki wrote that despite being a cardboard castle it looks decorative. Balumani of Anna praised the technical crew and Thevar Films for their hard work and efforts.
