= Anjatha Nenjangal =

- Theatrical release poster
- Directed by: R. Thyagarajan
- Produced by: C. Dhandayuthapani
- Starring: Suman; K. R. Vijaya; Saritha; Vanitha Krishnachandran
- Music by: Shankar–Ganesh
- Production company: Devar Films
- Release date: 26 October 1981
- Country: India
- Language: Tamil

Anjatha Nenjangal (transl. Fearless hearts) is a 1981 Indian Tamil-language film directed by R. Thyagarajan and produced by Devar Films. The film stars Suman, K. R. Vijaya, Saritha and Vanitha Krishnachandran. It was released on 26 October 1981, during Diwali.

== Cast ==
- Suman as Ravi
- K. R. Vijaya
- Jaishankar as Chinnadurai
- Saritha as Meena
- Raveendran as Ranga
- Tiger Prabhakar
- Vanitha Krishnachandran as Valli
- Rajeev
- Karate Mani

== Soundtrack ==
The music was composed by Shankar–Ganesh.

Track listing
No.	Title	Lyrics	Singer(s)	Length
1.	"En Kaathal Odangal Karai Serum Nerangal"	Vairamuthu	S. Janaki, Surender
2.	"Maappillaikku Oru Machcham Irukku"	Vaali	S. P. Balasubrahmanyam, Malaysia Vasudevan
3.	"Saappida Vaanga Ada Ungalathaanga"	Vaali	S. Jankaki
4.	"Thanna Thaanaa Thaalam Thaana"	Vaali	P. Susheela

== Release and reception ==
Anjatha Nenjangal was released on 26 October 1981, during Diwali. Despite facing competition from other Diwali releases including Thanneer Thanneer, Keezh Vaanam Sivakkum, Ranuva Veeran, Tik Tik Tik, Rajangam and Andha 7 Naatkal, the film became a commercial success.
