= Jeet Hamaari =

- Poster
- Directed by: R. Thyagarajan
- Written by: Ram Govind
- Produced by: C. Dhandayuthapani
- Starring: Rajinikanth; Rakesh Roshan; Ranjeeta; Anita Raj
- Cinematography: V. Ramamurthy
- Edited by: M. G. Balu Rao
- Music by: Bappi Lahiri
- Production company: Devar Films
- Distributed by: Everest Multimedia
- Release date: 1 July 1983
- Country: India
- Language: Hindi

Jeet Hamaari (transl. Victory is ours) is a 1983 Indian Hindi-language film directed by R. Thyagarajan and written by Ram Govind, starring Rajinikanth, Rakesh Roshan, Ranjeeta, Anita Raj in the lead roles. It was simultaneously shot in Tamil as Thai Veedu, with Rajinikanth, Anita Raj, Silk Smitha reprising their roles from the original Tamil version.

== Plot ==
Thakur Vikram Singh receives alarming news from a museum curator: his father's ancestral sword, crucial for revealing the hidden treasure's location, has been stolen. This sword holds half of the treasure's map, with the other half engraved on a sword still in Singh's possession. Determined to protect it, Singh confronts a thief named Avtar Singh in the act of stealing the sword, but Avtar kidnaps Singh's son, Mohan, and escapes.

Desperate to save his son, Singh agrees to Avtar's demand to exchange the sword for Mohan at the Black Hills. However, during the exchange, Singh's car is stolen by another thief, who takes Mohan and raises him as his own under the name Raju. Unbeknownst to Singh, Raju grows up to become a skilled car thief, eventually crossing paths with his own family, unaware of their true identities, in a twist of fate.

== Cast ==
- Rajinikanth as Mohan / Raju
- Rakesh Roshan as Anand
- Ranjeeta as Geeta
- Anita Raj as Anita
- Shakti Kapoor as Vijay
- Madan Puri as Avtar Singh
- Om Shivpuri as Thakur Vikram Singh
- Padma Chavan as Thakurain Nirmala Singh
- Silk Smitha as Soni
- Satyen Kappu as Raju's Foster Father
- Jagdish Raj as Police Commissioner Saxena
- Gurbachan Singh as Inspector Musibat Singh

== Music ==
Indeevar penned every song except "Aanewala Aaya Hai" (Maya Govind). The songs were reused from the original.

Song	Singer
"Har Kadam Par"	Kishore Kumar
"Nachke Dikhao"	S. P. Balasubrahmanyam
"Aapne Mujh Mein Kya Dekha"	S. P. Balasubrahmanyam, K. J. Yesudas, S. Janaki
"Tumko Agar Hai Pyar"	S. P. Balasubrahmanyam, Asha Bhosle
"Aanewala Aaya"	Asha Bhosle
