= Bewafai =

1985 film

- Poster
- Directed by: R. Thyagarajan
- Produced by: C. Dhandayudapani
- Starring: Rajesh Khanna; Rajinikanth; Tina Munim; Padmini Kohlapure; Meenakshi Seshadri; Pran
- Music by: Bappi Lahiri
- Release date: 5 July 1985
- Running time: 130 minutes
- Country: India
- Language: Hindi

Bewafai is a 1985 Hindi film starring Rajesh Khanna and Rajinikanth. The film was directed by R. Thyagarajan. Bewafai grossed ₹11.95 crore at the box office in 1985.

== Plot ==
Asha has been in love with Ashok since her childhood. But somehow she was never able to convey her feelings for him throughout her childhood and college days. Now Ashok works as an employee of her father Diwan Sardarilal. She becomes very possessive about him to the point where she cannot stand the thought of another woman then trying to woo him. The possessiveness becomes so strong that Asha beats up a woman Vinny over Ashok. She tries to be aware of Ashok's whereabouts. Renu falls in love with Ashok, breaking Asha heart. She learns that Ashok has long taken care of Renu. Asha decides to meet Renu to teach her a lesson but when she finds that Renu is a mental patient and Ashok has been nursing her, she changes her heart and begins to assist Ashok in doing service to the mentally imbalanced Renu. Their lives take an unexpected turn when Ranveer shoots Ashok and leaves him mortally wounded.

== Cast ==
- Rajinikanth as Ranveer
- Rajesh Khanna as Ashok
- Tina Munim as Asha
- Padmini Kolhapure as Renu
- Meenakshi Seshadri as Vinny
- Pran as Diwan Sardarilal
- A. K. Hangal as Hariharnath
- Urmila Bhatt as Mrs. Hariharnath
- Vijay Arora as Doctor
- Guddi Maruti as Guddi
- Gurubachan Singh as Ranga

== Music ==
Song	Singer	Lyricist(s)
"Hum Apni Wafa Yaad"	Kishore Kumar	Hasan Kamal
"Shukriya Dil Diya"	Kishore Kumar	Faruk Kaiser
"Hum Apni Wafa Yaad"	Lata Mangeshkar	Hasan Kamal
"Aaiye Na Kasam Se"	Asha Bhosle	Indeevar
"Allah Hoo, Allah Hoo"	Asha Bhosle	Faruk Kaiser
"Suno Zara Mere Sanam"	Asha Bhosle	Hasan Kamal
"Lachakta Jism, Jalte Lab"	Asha Bhosle	Hasan Kamal
"Ek Nazar Bas Dekhe"	Asha Bhosle	Faruk Kaiser
"Piya Aa, Piya Aa"	Asha Bhosle	Indeevar
