= Ranga (1982 film) =

- Poster
- Directed by: R. Thyagarajan
- Written by: Thooyavan
- Produced by: C. Dhandayudhapani
- Starring: Rajinikanth; Radhika; K. R. Vijaya
- Cinematography: V. Ramamoorthy
- Edited by: M. C. Balu Rao
- Music by: Shankar–Ganesh
- Production company: Thevar Films
- Release date: 14 April 1982
- Running time: 133 minutes
- Country: India
- Language: Tamil

Ranga is a 1982 Indian Tamil-language action film directed by R. Thyagarajan, produced by C. Dhandayudhapani under Thevar Films and stars Rajinikanth in the titular role, alongside Radhika and K. R. Vijaya. The film marks Rajinikanth's 75th film as an actor.

Ranga was released on 14 April 1982 and became a commercial success.

== Plot ==
Ranganathan is a young man who lost his sister Laksmi in childhood and has come to the city searching for work suitable for his graduation. There, he meets Raju, a thief. Ranga advises Raju to give up his life of crime and be a good man, whilst Raju simultaneously advises Ranga to turn to crime. After going their separate ways, both men end up taking each other's advice and change, Raju turning over a new leaf and Ranga going the other way and becoming a hit man for hire.

Laksmi is now married to a wealthy man and with a child called Suresh. Raju, who had changed comes across Suresh and saves him from a local thug. Laksmi decides to keep Raju as a guardian for Suresh to keep him safe from danger. Ranga has taken a contract from Ganga (Radhika) to collect money from the local gang leader Ravi. However, Ravi invites Ranga to join his gang, which is declined by Ranga, who states that he does not work for any gang, but is ready to do anything given enough money.

Ranga's first assignment with Ravi is to kidnap Suresh so they can threaten his parents for money. Ranga kidnaps Suresh, who is then saved by Raju. Raju does not know that it is Ranga who came to kidnap Suresh as Ranga was in disguise. Ranga realises it was Raju and he comes to meet Raju. Raju's joy knows no bounds as he meets Ranga and tells him that he works as a guardian for Suresh. Raju also introduces Laksmi to Ranga. Not knowing that Ranga is her brother and a hit man, she agrees to keep Ranga as another guardian for Suresh. Ranga reveals his true nature to Raju that he is the one who attempted to kidnap Suresh. Raju advises Ranga to give up his criminal life and be loyal to Laksmi. Ranga however is determined to kidnap Suresh and also challenges Raju, that he will chase him out and finish his task, which he does. But Ravi double crosses Ranga and reveals to him that Laksmi is his sister. Ranga is caught by Ravi's thugs, but Raju comes to the rescue and saves Ranga. Ravi is thrown in jail, Ranga reunites with his sister and he, Ganga and Raju all lead a happy life.

== Cast ==
- Rajinikanth as Ranganathan
- Radhika as Ganga
- K. R. Vijaya as Lakshmi
- Karate Mani as Raju
- Raveendran as Ravi
- Silk Smitha as Ravi's girlfriend
- Thengai Srinivasan as Ganga's uncle
- Ashokan as Special Appearance
- V. Gopalakrishnan as Special Appearance
- A. R. Srinivasan as Lakshmi 's Husband
- Master Haja Sheriff as Shanmuga
- Master Suresh as Suresh

== Production ==
Ranga is Rajinikanth's 75th film as an actor. The film was produced by C. Dhandayudhapani under the banner Thevar Films. Thooyavan wrote the dialogues while story was provided by the story unit of Thevar Films itself. The role of the title character's sister was originally offered to J. Jayalalithaa. She accepted the offer as she liked the character very much. However, due to the interference of M. G. Ramachandran, then the Chief Minister of Tamil Nadu, she was not cast. Ramachandran successfully suggested K. R. Vijaya for the role. Thyagarajan revealed he faced difficulties while shooting a song (Purushanthan) with Rajinikanth and Radhika at Mount Road, Chennai so the director had to shoot in such a way they appear during the shoot when there is no crowd and they hide whenever crowd reappears.

== Soundtrack ==
The music was composed by Shankar–Ganesh, with lyrics by Vaali. Shankar–Ganesh later adapted "Toothpaste" as "Nija Heluvenu Amma" for the Kannada film Chakravyuha (1983). The highlight of the album was the disco song "Pattukottai Ammalu". It was remixed by Ganesan S for Bagheera (2023).

Song	Singers
"Azhagana"	Malaysia Vasudevan, P. Susheela
"Pattukottai Ammalu"	S. P. Balasubrahmanyam, Malaysia Vasudevan
"Purushanthan"	S. P. Balasubrahmanyam, Vani Jayaram
"Toothpaste"	S. P. Balasubrahmanyam, S. Janaki

== Release and reception ==
Ranga was released on 14 April 1982 and emerged a box office success. Thiraignani of Kalki gave it the verdict, "Top Rajini formula".

== Legacy ==
One of Rajinikanth's famous dialogues "Appavum Thathavum", which itself is based on a lyric in the "Sambo Siva Sambo" song from his 1979 film Ninaithale Inikkum, was used in the promo teaser for the 2025 film Coolie. Imman Annachi introduces himself as Ranga in Puthiyathor Ulagam Seivom (2014).
