= Nyayam Kavali =

- Theatrical release poster
- Directed by: A. Kodandarami Reddy
- Written by: Satyanand (dialogues)
- Based on: Kotta Malupu by D. Kameswari
- Produced by: Kranthi Kumar
- Starring: Sarada; Chiranjeevi; Radhika; Jaggayya
- Cinematography: A. Venkat
- Edited by: B. Krishnam Raju
- Music by: K. Chakravarthy
- Production company: Sri Kranthi Chitra
- Release date: 15 May 1981
- Country: India
- Language: Telugu
- Budget: ₹5 lakh

Nyayam Kaavali (transl. Justice is demanded) is a 1981 Indian Telugu-language legal drama film directed by A. Kodandarami Reddy. The film is based on D. Kameswari's novel Kotta Malupu. It stars Sarada, Chiranjeevi, Radhika, and Jaggayya. The film was remade in Hindi as Mujhe Insaaf Chahiye in 1983, in Kannada as Keralida Hennu in 1984, in Tamil as Vidhi in 1984 and in Malayalam as Thaalam Thettiya Tharattu (1983).

== Plot ==
Suresh, the son of lawyer Dayanidhi, is a playboy and womaniser. Whenever he sets his eyes on a girl, he convinces her he is madly in love with her, then abandons her after having a relationship with her. This becomes a routine for him. Bharathi Devi is a girl from a middle-class family. Suresh meets her, tries his techniques to impress her, and succeeds. Bharathi loves him and yields to his advances for a physical relationship. They have sexual encounters, resulting in Bharathi becoming pregnant.

When she realises this, she requests Suresh to marry her, but he writes off their relationship. Much against her parents' suggestion to get an abortion, Bharathi decides to have the child and tells them that she wants to take Suresh to court and prove he has fathered her child. She leaves home and meets Sakunthala, a leading lawyer who works for women's rights.

Sakunthala's story is similar to Bharathi's: she had been Dayanidhi's lover. When she had become pregnant, he had deserted her, and she had given birth to an illegitimate daughter. Sakunthala does not want history to repeat itself and drags Suresh to the court on Bharathi's behalf. Dayanidhi fights for his son, but Sakunthala wins the case. The court declares Suresh the father of Bharathi's child, but leaves the decision of marriage to them.

While meeting the media after winning the case, Bharathi states that she intended to get legitimacy for her child. She declares that she is satisfied with the court's verdict and has decided to be on her own. Meanwhile, Sakunthala gets a heart attack, and before dying, she hands over her daughter in Bharathi's care.

Years later, Suresh and his wife, married for some years and childless, run into Bharathi. It turns out that she has been raising her son, all by herself, and he has become a talented, well-adjusted, smart boy.

== Cast ==
- Sarada as Lawyer Sakunthala
- Chiranjeevi as Suresh Kumar
- Radhika Sarathkumar as Bharathi Devi
- Jaggayya as Lawyer Dayanidhi
- Allu Ramalingaiah as Type Institute Owner
- Dasari Narayana Rao as himself (guest appearance)
- Baby Tulasi as Padma
- Chatla Sriramulu as Viswanatham
- P. J. Sarma as Judge
- Telephone Satyanarayana as Guest House Owner
- Pushpalatha as Savitri
- Athili Lakshmi as Padmavathi
- Baby Rohini as Saroja
- Halam as Club Dancer
- Fatafat Jayalaxmi as Jayalaxmi

== Production ==
Kranthi Kumar, who made Pranam Khareedu with Chiranjeevi, wanted to produce a small-budget film with him after the blockbuster Sardar Papa Rayudu. Doraiswamy Raju recommended the name of A. Kodandarami Reddy to Kranthikumar. After being unsatisfied with the scripts, Kranthi decided to adapt the novel Kotta Malupu into a feature film. The team decided to keep the film's title as Nyayam Kavali after considering titles like Aadapilla and Anyayam. The film was made on a budget of ₹5 lakh. Chiranjeevi was paid ₹15,000 and A. Kodandarami Reddy was paid ₹5,000. The film is Radhika's Telugu debut, and a scene where she slaps Chiranjeevi took 24 takes to perfect.

== Soundtrack ==
Music was composed by K. Chakravarthy.

Track listing
| No. | Title | Singer(s) | Length |
|---|---|---|---|
| 1. | "Bidi Bidi Bidiyamgaa" | P. Susheela and S. P. Balasubrahmanyam | 4:37 |
| 2. | "Ee Roje Aadivaramu" | P. Susheela, S. P. Balasubrahmanyam | 4:38 |
| 3. | "Ammo Naaku Bhayam" | P. Susheela, S. P. Balasubrahmanyam | 3:35 |
| 4. | "Nyayam Kavali Streelaku Nyayam Jaragali" | P. Susheela, S. P. Balasubrahmanyam | 3:07 |
| Total length: | | | 15:57 |

== Remakes ==
Nyayam Kavali was remade in Hindi as Mujhe Insaaf Chahiye in 1983, in Kannada as Keralida Hennu in 1984, in Tamil as Vidhi in 1984 and in Malayalam as Thaalam Thettiya Tharattu (1983).
