= Balapareekshanam =

1978 film

- Poster
- Directed by: Anthikkad Mani
- Screenplay by: Thoppil Bhasi
- Story by: K. Balachander
- Produced by: Babu Jose
- Starring: Raghavan; Jayabharathi; Adoor Bhasi; KP Ummer
- Cinematography: C. Namas
- Edited by: K. Sankunni
- Music by: M. K. Arjunan
- Production company: Ragam Pictures
- Distributed by: Ragam Pictures
- Release date: 28 July 1978
- Country: India
- Language: Malayalam

Balapareekshanam is a 1978 Indian Malayalam film, directed by Anthikkad Mani and produced by Babu Jose. The film stars Raghavan, Jayabharathi, KP Ummer, Adoor Bhasi and Babu Jose. It features a musical score by M. K. Arjunan. The film was based on the 1969 Tamil film Poova Thalaiya.

== Cast ==
- Jayabharathi as Nirmala
- Raghavan as Sankarankutty
- K. P. Ummer as Govindankutty
- Sukumari as Parvathyamma
- Adoor Bhasi as Ramesh
- Babu Jose
- Kottayam Santha as Raji's mother
- Pattom Sadan as Krishna Pilla
- Shubha as Raji
- Sreemoolanagaram Vijayan as Avarachan
- Paul Vengola as Kochu Kunju
- Pala Thankam as Krishna Pilla's wife
- Radhadevi as Gouri

== Soundtrack ==
The music was composed by M. K. Arjunan and the lyrics were written by Mankombu Gopalakrishnan.

No.	Song	Singers	Lyrics	Length (m:ss)
1	"Jeevitham Swayam"	Jolly Abraham	Mankombu Gopalakrishnan	
2	"Kaalindi Theerathe"	K. P. Brahmanandan	Mankombu Gopalakrishnan	
3	"Pullippuli Pole"	P. Jayachandran, Vani Jairam	Mankombu Gopalakrishnan	
4	"Vennilaa Puzhayile"	P. Susheela, Ambili	Mankombu Gopalakrishnan	
