= Panchavarna Kili =

1965 film directed by K. Shankar

- Theatrical release poster
- Directed by: K. Shankar
- Story by: Valampuri Somanathan
- Produced by: C. M. Chinnathambi
- Starring: R. Muthuraman; Jaishankar; K. R. Vijaya; Nagesh; Major Sundarrajan; Manorama
- Cinematography: Thambu
- Edited by: K. Narayanan
- Music by: Viswanathan–Ramamoorthy
- Production company: Saravana Pictures
- Release date: 21 May 1965
- Country: India
- Language: Tamil

Panchavarna Kili (transl. Macaw) is a 1965 Indian Tamil-language film directed by K. Shankar and produced by Saravana Pictures. The film stars R. Muthuraman, Jaishankar, K. R. Vijaya, Nagesh, Major Sundarrajan and Manorama. It was released on 21 May 1965, and became a commercial success.

== Plot ==
Megala wants to marry Sekar – an army officer, Sokkalingam first son. To her dismay, he is married to Chitra in Delhi and they have a child. Meanwhile, Sokkalingam is looking for marriage alliance for her second son Kannan through marriage broker Kalyanam. Kalyanam learns that Sekar's brother already has radio singer Vani in mind. He arranges marriage of Kannan and Vani. In a twist, Sekar look alike Balu – Vani niece morphs a photo with him and Vani. The morphed photo is sent to Sekar house to stop the marriage. Ashamed of the bad name, Vani mother dies and Vani absconds to Delhi. Vani picks her sister kid and returns to Sekar house to hand over the kid. In some twist, Vani is mistaken as Sekar wife and kept in house. Later Balu enters Sokkalingam house as Sekar using look alike appearance. Also, by lying and bribing to broker, he sets up Kannan to marry another women as Vani by proxying through a setup. Vani learns about her niece's malpractice. In a scramble, she suffers injury and lies in bed. In another twist, Sekar appears before his parents as he escaped Chinese captivity during war and did not die. With Sekar look alike, creating confusion, police arrive with broker to Sekar house. Broker reveals about the bribing incident. In this, Kannan clears the confusion by claiming that Sekar kid is dead. Look alike not panicking in that situation, is found to be the culprit. The police arrest him. Finally, Vani marries Sekar's brother, and Megala marries Sekar.

== Cast ==
- Jaishankar as Sekar / Balu
- Muthuraman as Kannan
- K. R. Vijaya as Vani
- Revathi as Megala
- Major Sundarrajan as Chokkalingam
- S. N. Lakshmi as Meenakshi
- L. Vijayalakshmi as Dancer
- Nagesh as Kalyanam
- Manorama as Meena
- Karikol Raju as Vadivelu
- A. Veerappan as Nagappan
- Shoba as Fake Vani

== Production ==
Panchavarna Kili was inspired from the 1950 film No Man of Her Own, and shot at AVM Studios. The story was, however, credited to Valampuri Somanathan. Ra. Sankaran worked as associate director.

== Soundtrack ==
The soundtrack was composed by the duo Viswanathan–Ramamoorthy, while the lyrics were written by Bharathidasan and Vaali. The song "Azhagan Muruganidam Aasai Vaithen" is set in Tilang raga. The song "Tamizhukkum Amudhendru Per" extols the sweetness of the Tamil language, noting it means "that which is sweet" as it is derived from the world "Tam" (meaning self) and "-izh" (an archaic word for honey).

Track listing
No.	Title	Lyrics	Singers	Length
1.	"Avallukum Thamizh"	Vaali	T. M. Soundararajan	3:56
2.	"Vaa Vaa Kannan Varuvaan"	Vaali	P. Susheela	5:23
3.	"Tamizhukkum Amudhendru Per"	Bharathidasan	P. Susheela	4:04
4.	"Azhagan Muruganidam Aasai Vaithen"	Vaali	P. Susheela	3:30
Total length:				16:53

== Reception ==
Kalki lauded Thambu's cinematography and Shankar's direction, saying the latter helped a confusing story look clear. The critic also appreciated Nagesh and Manorama's comedy.

== Bibliography ==
- Pillai, Swarnavel Eswaran (2015). Madras Studios: Narrative, Genre, and Ideology in Tamil Cinema. SAGE Publications. ISBN 9789351502128.
