= Yaar Nee? =

1966 Tamil-language film directed by Sathyam

- Poster
- Directed by: Sathyam
- Screenplay by: M. K. Ramu
- Based on: Woh Kaun Thi?
- Produced by: P. S. Veerappa
- Starring: Jaishankar; Jayalalitha
- Cinematography: A. R. Subbha Rao
- Edited by: S. A. Murugesh
- Music by: Vedha
- Production company: PSV Pictures
- Release date: 14 April 1966
- Running time: 152 minutes
- Country: India
- Language: Tamil

Yaar Nee? (transl. Who are you?) is a 1966 Indian Tamil-language psychological thriller film, directed by Sathyam and produced by P. S. Veerappa. The film stars Jaishankar and Jayalalitha. It is a remake of the Hindi film Woh Kaun Thi? (1964). The film, released on 14 April 1966, was a box office success, and Jayalalithaa won the Madras Filmfans Association Award for Best Actress.

== Plot ==
On a rainy night, the highly reputed Dr. Anand is driving. He sees a woman standing in the road and gives her a lift. She introduces herself as No one. As soon as she steps in the car (Austin Cambridge A55 Mark II), the wipers eerily stop working. He's even more spooked when the lady shows him the way when it isn't visible and guides him outside a cemetery. On reaching the cemetery, the gates open automatically and he hears someone sing the words "Nanae Varuven meendum varuven".

Dr. Anand is about to inherit a large fortune from a distant relative under the condition that he is perfectly mentally stable—otherwise, he would not inherit the property as there had already been cases of mental instability in his family in the past. His colleague, Dr. Lata loves Dr. Anand, but he already has a girlfriend, Rama. The mystery unfolds when Rama is killed by a cyanide injection and the suspects are Dr. Lata and her father, Dr. Giri, the head doctor of the hospital in which Anand and Lata work.

On a stormy night, Anand is called to a dilapidated mansion on an emergency case. There, he learns that the patient has already died. He is surprised to see that the patient is the same girl. Some policemen tell him that the place has been deserted for a while and that it is rumoured to be haunted. The policemen inform him that what he saw in the mansion happened years ago and many a doctor has registered similar cases with the police on rainy nights. On another occasion, he sees a newspaper that says that the same girl died in a rail accident.

Anand is very unhappy after his girlfriend's demise, but his marriage is fixed to a girl named Sandhya, Anand's mother has never even seen but was recommended by her sister. On the wedding night, Anand is shocked to see that she is like the same girl. He starts avoiding her. One day, he sees that she has painted the same bungalow in which he was called on that rainy night. Just after that, he hears her singing a part of "Nanae Varuven meendum varuvan ( I have come and I shall come again) ". Another evening, he sees an unmanned boat sailing in the lake and hears another part of "Nanae varuven meendum varuven ". Yet another night, the Sandhya reaches Anand's hospital and tries to impress him with her beauty and singing. He gets impressed and they sit in the car, where he gets déjà vu as again the wipers stop working and she can clearly see the way on the stormy and foggy night. He takes her to the bungalow and to the room where he had seen her dead and she disappears. When he reaches home, she is waiting for him and his mother says that she never left the house.

Anand is finally successful in persuading his mother to let Sandhya go back to her home by train. The next day, he learns that the train was in an accident, but he saw her on the terrace that same night. All these things take a toll on his mental health and he is advised to take some rest in Shimla. There, he meets a monk on a hilltop who tells him that 100 years ago at this very spot, a boy and a girl were romancing when the girl fell and died. Since then, her spirit has been roaming, waiting for her lover to return, who has been reincarnated in Anand's form. Anand then sees Sandhya far down the hillside and she sings the last part of "Nanae varuven meendum varuven ". Persuaded, Anand jumps but is saved by Lata.

Later, when Anand sees Sandhya trying to lure him out, he follows her to the same old bungalow, where he sees Sandhya on the stairway in one moment and then impossibly beside him in another. She lures him to the roof, where suddenly he sees a duplicate of Sandhya who came running out of a room in the house. The duplicate shouts that she is the real Sandhya but she is taken away. Strengthened by this sudden revelation, Anand realises this woman on the roof is not a ghost and confronts her, but she accidentally falls down and dies. Then comes Ramesh, Anand's cousin. The climax of the movie comes here as Ramesh reveals that all this was his plan from the very beginning so that Anand is termed as mentally unstable and that his entire inheritance would pass to the next cousin i.e., Ramesh. A duel follows with other henchmen of Ramesh joining to kill Anand but the police arrive and arrest all the culprits.

The superintendent reveals the hidden details of how the previous acts had been staged with the policeman, the monk, and the 'servant' Madhav and tells the story of the other woman who was Sandhya's twin, whose existence was unknown to Sandhya. Sandhya's parents had separated them 18 years ago when her mother took away the other girl. Her mother died, and she was forced to adopt unfair means for her living. Her father learned of her after 16 years but he couldn't tell Sandhya about her twin sister. But somehow Ramesh learned of this twin sister and he started his brilliant planning. The "Sandhya" who had lured him in the hospital, the woman he had met on the road, the dead girl in the mansion, and the woman in white in Shimla were all acts done by this other girl. This explains the entire story and Sandhya's simultaneous presence in two places. Hence, the mystery is solved and at the end of the film Sandhya and Anand reunite.

== Cast ==
- Jaishankar as Dr. Anand
- Jayalalitha as Sandhya and Mohini
- C. L. Anandan as Ramesh
- C. Lakshmi Rajyam as Dr. Latha
- S. V. Ramadas as Chief Dr. Giri
- B. V. Radha as Rama
- Manorama as Thamarai / Sulakshana
- A. Veerappan as Madhavan
- Pushpamala as Valli
- O. A. K. Thevar as Saint
- C. K. Saraswathi as a drama artist
- K. Malathy as Anand's mother
- P. S. Veerappa as Guest

== Soundtrack ==
The music was composed by Vedha and lyrics were written by Kannadasan. The songs composed by Madan Mohan for the Hindi original were reused, though Vedha received sole composing credit. "Ponmeni Thazhuvamal" is based on "Lag Jaa Gale" from Woh Kaun Thi.

Song	Singer	Length
"Tikkiriki Tikkiriki Tattada"	P. B. Srinivas, L. R. Eswari	3:18
"Parvai Ondre Pothume"	T. M. Soundararajan, L. R. Eswari	4:07
"Kannukenna Summa"	L. R. Eswari	4:41
"Mulli Roja"	P. Suseela	3:03
"Ponmeni Thazhuvamal"	P. Suseela	4:23
"En Vedhanaiyil"	P. Suseela	3:14
"Naane Varuven"	P. Suseela	6:53
"Naane Varuven" (Solo)	P. Suseela	2:43
"Naane Varuven" (Sad)	P. Suseela	4:27

== Reception ==
Kalki praised the film for the cinematography and cast performances, particularly Jayalalithaa.
