= Veettuku Veedu =

1970 film by C. V. Rajendran

- Poster
- Directed by: C. V. Rajendran
- Written by: Chithralaya Gopu
- Based on: Thikku Theriyatha Veettil by Chithralaya Gopu
- Produced by: S. Suryaprakash; Rajan; R. Renganathan; R. Parthasarathy
- Starring: Jaishankar; Lakshmi; R. Muthuraman; Vennira Aadai Nirmala; Nagesh
- Cinematography: M. Karnan; K. S. Bhaskar Rao
- Edited by: N. M. Sankar
- Music by: M. S. Viswanathan
- Production company: Babu Movies
- Release date: 29 May 1970
- Country: India
- Language: Tamil

Veettuku Veedu (transl. Home to Home) is a 1970 Indian Tamil-language comedy film directed by C. V. Rajendran and written by Chithralaya Gopu. It is based on Gopu's Tamil play Thikku Theriyatha Veettil (transl. Lost in the dense house) which was based on the English play Right Bed Wrong Husband by Caroline and Neil Schaffner. The film stars Jaishankar, Lakshmi, R. Muthuraman, Vennira Aadai Nirmala and Nagesh, with V. K. Ramasamy and Major Sundarrajan playing supporting roles. It was released on 29 May 1970. The film was remade in Kannada as Galate Samsara (1977) again directed by Rajendran.

== Plot ==
Vasudevan is rich businessman Kadikalingam's son. Vasu is fearful of his father, because Kadikalingam is a very strict man. He works at his father's company as General Manager. He is in love with a young, bold woman, Malathy. But Kadikalingam strictly opposes this love, so Vasu leaves his home and registers for marriage to Malathy. The couple is tenant to Kala's house. She is Malathy's close friend and her husband is Balu. He has a close relationship with another woman, Prameela, who is a stage dancer. Kala feels unhappy about her married life. Balu has been avoiding Kala lately since his infidelity with Prameela. Balu is physically abusive towards his wife. Malathy warns Balu to stay away from Prameela and to be sincere to his wife. Balu signs the divorce papers and leaves his wife and starts staying at his girlfriend's house.

Meanwhile, Balu's paternal uncle died in an accident and had named him the next of kin in the will. They intend laying their hand on 2 lakhs cash. In a moment of crisis, Malathy is forced to make her husband Vasu pose as Kala's husband Balu. Pattusamy is manager Paramanandham's son, who works as a music teacher. Pattusamy and Paramanandham come to Kala's house and spend a week with her at her home. Pattusamy falls in love with Malathy. He tries to impress her. Pattusamy is always standing in front of Malathy's room watching her.

Prameela finds a richer businessman than Balu and kicks him out. Balu who sees Vasu and Kala's photo published in a newspaper for a soap company advertisement, goes home and argues with Vasu and Malathy. Then Malathy briefly explains the house's situation. Balu claims to hear the truth and also joins the drama.

Next day, Balu introduces himself to Paramanandham as Ramesh, Malathy's brother from Sri Lanka. Pattusamy closely watches the house and the peoples' activities because he thinks there is something fishy with the members of the house. He tells his suspicion to his father, but Paramandham does not believe his son. Unfortunately, Kadigalingam reaches Vasu's rented house and calls Kala for our home. Then, Kala and Malathy were explained the truth and Kadikalingam understood Malathy is his daughter-in-law's and mistress of Vasu. Pattusamy and his father hear the news. They are explained the crisis situation and then Paramandham gives the cash into Kala and Balu's hands. Finally, Malathy succeeds in her plan and Pattusamy was asked to apologise to Malathy.

== Cast ==
- Jaishankar as Vasudevan
- Lakshmi as Malathi
- R. Muthuraman as Balu
- Vennira Aadai Nirmala as Kala
- Nagesh as Pattusamy
- Major Sundarrajan as Kadikalingam
- V. K. Ramasamy as Paramanadham
- Typist Gopu as Manager
- Master Prabhakar as Sambath
- Radhika as Prameela

== Production ==
Jayalalithaa, after watching the play Thikku Theriyatha Veettil written by Chithralaya Gopu, expressed interest in acting in a potential film adaptation; however, she was unable to, and Lakshmi was cast instead in the film titled Veettukku Veedu. The role was portrayed in the play by Manorama. Gopu was retained as screenwriter.

== Soundtrack ==
Music was composed by M. S. Viswanathan and the lyrics were written by Kannadasan.

Song	Singers	Length
"Angam Puthuvitham"	S. P. Balasubrahmanyam, L. R. Eswari	4:08
"Naam Iruvarum Sugam"	L. R. Eswari	3:33
"Thottu Thottu Parthaal"	P. Susheela	3:41
"Antha Pakkam"	Saibaba	3:05
"Nalvazhvu Naam Vazha"	P. Susheela	3:24

== Release and reception ==
Veettukku Veedu was released on 29 May 1970. The Indian Express praised the film's cast, especially Lakshmi "who tops everybody" and also praised the crew, citing "Gopu has done a competent screenplay. Director Rajendran has kept a brisk pace".
