= Nee! =

1965 film by Kanagashanmugam and T. R. Ramanna

- Theatrical release poster
- Directed by: T. R. Ramanna; Kanagashanmugam
- Written by: Sakthi T. K. Krishnasamy
- Produced by: T. K. Ramaraj
- Starring: Jaishankar; Jayalalithaa
- Cinematography: M. A. Rahman
- Edited by: M. S. Mani
- Music by: M. S. Viswanathan
- Production company: Sri Vinayaga Pictures
- Release date: 21 August 1965
- Running time: 123 minutes
- Country: India
- Language: Tamil

Nee! (transl. You!) is a 1965 Indian Tamil-language film, directed by Kanagashanmugam (with T. R. Ramanna receiving "supervising director" credit) and produced by T. K. Ramaraj. The film stars Jaishankar and Jayalalithaa. It was released on 21 August 1965 and became a commercial success.

== Plot ==
Sundaram, a rich man, falls in love with an orphaned girl, and marries her over the objections of his elder brother. He sets up a home of his own with his wife, but when his family members persuade him to rejoin the household, he brings his wife to his brother's house. There is once again cheer and sunshine in his life. Trouble arises when he is away from the house to accept a new job offered to him. The son-in-law of the house, a magistrate, leaks out the news that the orphan girl has earlier been convicted by him for immoral traffic. At once, insults are heaped on her. Unable to bear the taunting remarks, the girl leaves the house. The real drama then begins and all ends well.

== Cast ==
- Jaishankar as Sundaram
- Jayalalithaa as Jaya and Usha
- Nagesh as Raju
- S. V. Sahasranamam as Ramadurai
- Pandari Bai as Mangalam
- S. V. Ramadas as Gopal
- G. Sakunthala as Chithra
- Madhavi as Chellayee
- R. S. Manohar as Sekar
- Ennathe Kannaiah as Saamy
- Karikol Raju
- Sadhan as Chappani
- M. Bhanumathi as Sundaram's fiancé
- Shoba as Sundaram's sister in law

== Production ==
Nee! was directed by Kanagashanmugam, while T. R. Ramanna received "supervising director" credit. The film was produced by T. K. Ramaraj under Sri Vinayaga Pictures, and was the company's first production. Sakthi T. K. Krishnasamy was the writer, Selvaraj was art director, M. A. Rahman was cinematographer, and M. S. Mani was editor. The film was completed in two months, and its final cut measured 3,977 metres (13,048 ft).

== Soundtrack ==
The music was composed by M. S. Viswanathan, while the lyrics were written by Vaali.

Song	Singers	Length
"Adada Enna Azhagu"	L. R. Eswari	03:59
"Vellikkizhamai"	P. Susheela	03:25
"One Day One Way"	P. B. Srinivas L. R. Eswari	04:16
"Sonnaalum Sonnaandi"	L. R. Eswari	05:00
"Vanthaalenna" (Enakkuvantha)	L. R. Eswari	06:01
"Santhosham Vandhal"	P. B. Srinivas P.Susheela	04:24

== Release and reception ==
Nee! was released on 21 August 1965. Writing for Sport and Pastime, T. M. Ramachandran positively reviewed the film, saying the male and female leads showed "promising talent". The film became a commercial success.
