= Uyira Maanama =

1968 film by K. S. Gopalakrishnan

- Theatrical release poster
- Directed by: K. S. Gopalakrishnan
- Written by: K. S. Gopalakrishnan
- Produced by: K. S. Sabarinathan
- Starring: Jaishankar; Vijaya Nirmala; R. Muthuraman; Krishna Kumari
- Music by: M. S. Viswanathan
- Production company: Amarjothi Movies
- Release date: 21 October 1968
- Running time: 188 minutes
- Country: India
- Language: Tamil

Uyira Maanama (transl. Life or Reputation?) is a 1968 Indian Tamil-language film written and directed by K. S. Gopalakrishnan. The film stars Jaishankar, Vijaya Nirmala, R. Muthuraman and Krishna Kumari. It was released on 21 October 1968 (Diwali day), and was commercially successful.

== Cast ==
- Jaishankar as Kannan
- Vijaya Nirmala as Radha
- R. Muthuraman
- M. N. Nambiar as Nagappan
- Nagesh
- S. Varalakshmi as Kamala
- T. K. Bhagavathi as Santhanam
- B. Saroja Devi
- Krishna Kumari as a Russian woman
- G. Sakunthala as Nagappan's wife
- Radhabhai

== Production ==
Uyira Maanama was written and directed by K. S. Gopalakrishnan, and produced by K. S. Sabarinathan under Amarjothi Movies. One of the shooting locations was Yercaud. The final cut of the film was 5,136 metres (16,850 ft).

== Soundtrack ==
The soundtrack was composed by M. S. Viswanathan and the lyrics were written by Kannadasan.

Track listing
No.	Title	Singer(s)	Length
1.	"Kodiyil Irandu"	T. M. Soundararajan, P. Susheela	3:18
2.	"Kutrala Malaiyile"	Sirkazhi Govindarajan, L. R. Eswari	4:31
3.	"Savaale Samali"	T. M. Soundararajan, L. R. Eswari	4:22
4.	"Aathirathil thudupeduthai"	P. Susheela	3:22
Total length:			15:33

== Release and reception ==
Uyira Manama was released on 21 October 1968 (Diwali day), and was commercially successful.

== Bibliography ==
- Cowie, Peter, ed. (1968). World Filmography. Tantivy Press. ISBN 978-0-904208-36-8.
- Ramakrishnan, K. P. (2007). எம். ஜி. ஆர். ஓர் சகாப்தம் [M. G. R.: A Tribute] (in Tamil). Vikatan Publications. ISBN 9788189936006.
