= R. Thyagarajan (director) =

Indian writer

- R. ஹ்யகரஜன்
- Born: 1939; Pollachi, Tamil Nadu, India
- Died: 1 July 2018 (aged 78–79); Chennai, Tamil Nadu, India
- Occupations: Writer, producer, director

R. Thyagarajan (1939-1 July 2018) was an Indian writer, producer and director who worked in Tamil cinema.

== Film career ==
Thyagarajan grew up in Pollachi in an extended family of 23 people, and had four sisters and four brothers. After studying in Pollachi, he went on to study chemistry in Peelamedu, with the intention of becoming a chemist. After his marriage in 1966, he began to work on the productions of his father-in-law, Sandow M. M. A. Chinnappa Thevar of Devar Films. He initially worked on the story-discussion panel teams in 1968 and progressed to the editing department. In the late 1960s, he worked as an assistant director and as an associate editor in the films, Haathi Mere Saathi (1971) and Nalla Neram (1972).

His first directorial venture was Vellikizhamai Viratham (1974), which portrayed the bond between the female protagonist and her deity, the Naga-Devatha. The film starring Sivakumar, performed well at the box office and was later remade in Hindi and Telugu. Over the course of his career, he was closely associated with Devar Films, eventually going on to make over 30 films. He made 11 films with Rajinikanth in the lead role, including the Tamil-Telugu bilinguals Annai Oru Aalayam (1979) and Anbukku Naan Adimai (1980), the crime drama Ranga (1982), and the Hindi film Bewafai (1985). Several of the films produced under the Devar Films banner featured animals such as lions, snakes and elephants in pivotal scenes, and Thyagarajan became renowned for handling the shoot.

== Personal life ==
In 1966, Thyagarajan married T. Subbulakshmi. He subsequently became the son-in-law of Sandow M. M. A. Chinnappa Thevar. He had two children, son Vel Muruga and daughter Shanmugha Vadivu.

== Death ==
Thyagarajan died on 1 July 2018 following a heart attack.

== Partial filmography ==
Director

Year	Film	Language
1974	Shubh Din	Hindi
1974	Vellikizhamai Viratham	Tamil
1975	Thiruvarul	Tamil
1976	Thayilla Kuzhandhai	Tamil
1977	Murugan Adimai	Tamil
1977	Aattukara Alamelu	Tamil
1977	Sorgam Naragam	Tamil
1978	Pottelu Punnamma	Telugu
1978	Mera Rakshak	Hindi
1978	Thai Meethu Sathiyam	Tamil
1979	Annai Oru Aalayam	Tamil
1979	Amma Evarikaina Amma	Telugu
1979	Thaayillamal Naan Illai	Tamil
1980	Bangaru Lakshmi	Telugu
1980	Anbukku Naan Adimai	Tamil
1980	Mayadari Krishnudu	Telugu
1981	Ram Lakshman	Tamil
1981	Main Aur Mera Haathi	Hindi
1981	Anjatha Nenjangal	Tamil
1982	Ranga	Tamil
1982	Adhisayappiravigal	Tamil
1983	Shasti Viratham	Tamil
1983	Thai Veedu	Tamil
1983	Apoorva Sahodarigal	Tamil
1983	Jeet Hamaari	Hindi
1984	Nalla Naal	Tamil
1985	Annai Bhoomi	Tamil
1985	Anthasthu	Tamil
1985	Bewafai	Hindi
1986	Dharmam	Tamil
1988	Sigappu Thali	Tamil

Writer

- Chellakutti (1987; Tamil)
