= Muthu Chippi =

- Theatrical release poster
- Directed by: M. Krishnan
- Written by: 'Thuraiyur' K. Moorthi
- Produced by: P. L. Mohan Ram
- Starring: Jaishankar; Jayalalithaa; Nagesh
- Cinematography: N. S. Mani
- Edited by: S. A. Murugesan
- Music by: S. M. Subbaiah Naidu
- Production company: Mohan Productions
- Release date: 6 September 1968
- Running time: 131 minutes
- Country: India
- Language: Tamil

Muthu Chippi (transl. Pearl Oyster) is a 1968 Indian Tamil-language film, directed by M. Krishnan and produced by P. L. Mohan Ram. The film stars Jaishankar, Jayalalithaa and Nagesh. It was released on 6 September 1968, and became a box office hit. The film was remade in Telugu as Agni Pariksha.

== Plot ==
A young woman named Geetha falls victim to tragic circumstances and is forced into prostitution. She cross paths with, her childhood friend who remembers her original purity and innocence. Unwilling to let her suffer, Prabhakar is determined to rescue her from her circumstances. He persuades her to marry him so she can start a new life. Their union sparks deep resentment from a conservative society that refuses to look past Geetha's forced history.

== Cast ==
- Jaishankar as Prabha
- Jayalalithaa as Geetha
- Nagesh as Sathiyam
- Shylashri as Dancer
- Major Sundarrajan as Prabha's father
- Thengai Srinivasan as Womanizer
- C. K. Saraswathi as Pimpstress
- Tambaram Lalitha
- Ennathe Kannaiah as Hotel customer
- Karikol Raju as Office staff
- Loose Mohan as Hotel boy
- K. Kannan as Prabha's friend
- S. Ramanathan
- S. R. Janaki
- 'Master' Prabhakar
- 'Baby' Vijaya

== Soundtrack ==
The music was composed by S. M. Subbaiah Naidu, with lyrics by Vaali. The song "Thotta Idam" attained popularity.

Song	Singers	Length
"Azhagu Thirumeni"	P. Susheela	02:57
"Maalaiyitta Kanavan"	P. Susheela	02:53
"Oru Naal Pazhagiya"	T. M. Soundararajan, P. Susheela	03:15
"Thattatum Kaigal"	L. R. Eswari	02:29
"Thotta Idam Thulanga"	Sirkazhi Govindarajan	03:19
