= Iravum Pagalum =

1965 film directed by Joseph Thaliath Jr.

- Theatrical release poster
- Directed by: Joseph Thaliath Jr.
- Story by: T. N. Balu
- Produced by: Joseph Thomas
- Starring: Jaishankar; C. Vasantha
- Cinematography: B. B. Lucas
- Edited by: P. Radhakrishnan; M. Vellaisaamy
- Music by: T. R. Pappa
- Production company: Citadel Films
- Release date: 14 January 1965
- Country: India
- Language: Tamil

Iravum Pagalum (transl. Night and Day) is a 1965 Indian Tamil-language crime thriller film directed by Joseph Thaliath Jr. The film stars then newcomers Jaishankar and C. Vasantha, while S. A. Ashokan, Nagesh, Gandhimathi and Pandari Bai play supporting roles. In the film, a college student's house is robbed, and his mother prevents him from reporting it to the police. Suspicious, he sets out to unravel the mystery behind his mother's silence. The film was released on 14 January 1965 and became a commercial success.

== Plot ==
Rajasekar is a wealthy college student who lives with his widowed mother Maragadhavalli and leads an untroubled life; he is in love with Parimala, his classmate. One night, Rajasekar and Maragadhavalli are robbed of their wealth by a gang. As Maragadhavalli prevents Rajasekar from reporting this incident to the police, he sets out to unravel the mystery behind his mother's silence.

== Cast ==
Male cast

- Jaishankar as Rajasekar
- Ashokan as Govindan
- Ramdas as the calvary leader
- Nagesh as Balu
- Baskar as Gopal
- Viswanthan as the office manager

Male support cast

- Ennathe Kannaiah, Muthukoorthan, Prabhakar,
  Vasanthan, P. K. S. Mani, and Master Sridar.

Female cast

- C. Vasantha as Parimala
- Gandhimathi as Chandra
- Pandari Bai as Maragadhavalli
- Mallika as Kamala's mother
- Baby Bhavani as Kamala
- Ramamani Bai as the maid

Dance

- Sakunthala

== Production ==
Joseph Thaliath Jr. set up a production company named "Citadel Films", the name being inspired by the A. J. Cronin novel The Citadel. He wanted to adapt that novel into a Tamil film, but Citadel Films co-founder F. Nagoor dissuaded him from doing so as he felt the subject was "risky". He instead suggested a crime thriller, which became Iravum Pagalum. Due to the film's low budget, Joseph chose to cast newcomers. Joseph cast theatre actor Subramaniam Shankar in the lead role, christening him Jaishankar and marking the actor's film debut. C. Vasantha was cast as the female lead, also making her film debut. Thengai Srinivasan was also cast in what would have been his film debut, but was removed after distributors were not supportive of him. Suruli Rajan, in his film debut, appeared uncredited. The film was produced by Joseph Thomas under the Citadel banner, photographed by B. B. Lucas, and edited by P. Radhakrishnan and M. Vellaisaamy. The final length of the film was 4,509.67 metres (14,795.5 ft).

== Soundtrack ==
The soundtrack album was composed by T. R. Pappa. The lyrics were written by Alangudi Somu.

Track listing
No.	Title	Singer(s)	Length
1.	"Iravu Varum"	T. M. Soundararajan	3:45
2.	"Kaalai Neram Oruvan"	P. Susheela, T. M. Soundararajan	4:04
3.	"Koothaadum Kondaiyile"	Sirkazhi Govindarajan, P. Susheela	3:03
4.	"Kunguma Kolam"	T.M. Soundararajan, P. Susheela	3:15
5.	"Ullathin Kathavugal"	T. M. Soundararajan	3:36
6.	"Iranthavanai Sumanthavanum"	S. A. Ashokan	3:21

== Release and reception ==
Iravum Pagalum was released on 14 January 1965, Pongal day. Despite facing competition from other Pongal releases such as Enga Veettu Pillai and Pazhani, the film became a commercial success. The Indian Express said on 6 February 1965, "Iravum Pagalum, despite a muddled script, is above the level of the run-of-the-mill suspense thrillers and has obvious box office potential".
