= Vidhi (1984 film) =

1984 film by K. Vijayan

- Theatrical release poster
- Directed by: K. Vijayan
- Written by: Aaroor Dass (dialogue)
- Story by: D. Kameswari
- Produced by: Anandavalli Balaji
- Starring: Sujatha; Mohan; Poornima; Jaishankar
- Cinematography: Tiwari
- Edited by: V. Chakrapani
- Music by: Shankar–Ganesh
- Production company: Sujatha Cine Arts
- Release date: 26 January 1984
- Running time: 137 minutes
- Country: India
- Language: Tamil

Vidhi (transl. Fate) is a 1984 Indian Tamil-language legal drama film directed by K. Vijayan. A remake of the Telugu film Nyayam Kavali (1981), it stars Sujatha, Mohan, Poornima, and Jaishankar. The film revolves around a court case that Radha (Poornima) files against Raja (Mohan), concerning the legitimacy of her child conceived out of wedlock.

Principal photography began in December 1983 and was completed within two months. Vidhi was released on 26 January 1984. The film received positive reviews from critics, particularly for the dialogues in its courtroom scenes and was a commercial success, running for over 500 days in theatres.

== Plot ==
Raja, the son of lawyer "Tiger" Dayanidhi, is a playboy and womaniser. Whenever he sets his eyes on a girl, he convinces her he is madly in love with her, then abandons her after having a relationship with her. This becomes a routine for him. Radha is a girl from a middle-class family. Raja meets her, tries his techniques to impress her, and succeeds. Radha loves him and yields to his advances for a physical relationship.

When Radha realises she is pregnant, she requests Raja to marry her, but he writes off their relationship. Much against her parents' suggestion to get an abortion, Radha decides to have the child and tells them that she wants to take Raja to court and prove he has fathered her child. She leaves home and meets Sakunthala, a leading lawyer who works for women's rights.

Sakunthala's story is similar to Radha's: she had been Dayanidhi's lover. When she had become pregnant, he had deserted her, and she had given birth to an illegitimate daughter. Sakunthala does not want history to repeat itself and drags Raja to the court on Radha's behalf. Dayanidhi fights for his son, but Sakunthala wins the case. The court declares Raja the father of Radha's child, but leaves the decision of marriage to them.

While meeting the media after winning the case, Radha states that she intended to get legitimacy for her child. She declares that she is satisfied with the court's verdict and has decided to be on her own. Meanwhile, Sakunthala gets a heart attack, and before dying, she hands over her daughter in Radha's care.

Years later, Raja and his wife, married for some years and childless, run into Radha. It turns out that she has been raising her son, Suresh, all by herself, and he has become a talented, well-adjusted, smart boy.

== Cast ==
- Sujatha as Sakunthala
- Mohan as Raja
- Poornima as Radha
- Jaishankar as "Tiger" Dayanidhi
- K. Bhagyaraj as himself (guest appearance)
- K. Balaji as the judge
- Manorama as Pattama
- Livingston as K. Bhagyaraj's assistant
- Sathyakala as Raja's wife
- Poornam Viswanathan as Radha's father

== Production ==
Vidhi, a remake of the Telugu film Nyayam Kavali (1981) was produced by Sujatha Cine Arts. Although A. Kodandarami Reddy, director of the original, was offered to direct the remake, he declined owing to his lack of fluency in Tamil. Hence, K. Vijayan was chosen. Aaroor Dass was chosen to write the dialogues after being asked to by K. Balaji. This marked his return to film after a near 17-year sabbatical; he last wrote for Thangai (1967). Because Sujatha's character, a lawyer, speaks lengthy dialogues, and the actress found memorising them difficult, Dass simplified her dialogues. During the scene where her character faints in court, Sujatha fainted for real. Principal photography began on 1 December 1983 and was completed within two months.

== Soundtrack ==
The soundtrack was composed by the duo Shankar–Ganesh, while the lyrics were written by Vaali. The songs "L O V E – Lovethaan" and "Vaadi Macchi" attained popularity.

Track listing
No.	Title	Singer(s)	Length
1.	"Devadasum Naanum"	Malaysia Vasudevan	4:30
2.	"Vaadi Macchi"	S. P. Balasubrahmanyam	4:35
3.	"L O V E – Lovethaan"	S. P. Balasubrahmanyam, S. P. Sailaja	4:21
4.	"Vidhi Varaindha"	Kalyani Menon	3:49
Total length:			17:15

== Release and reception ==
Vidhi was released on 26 January 1984. The film received positive reviews from critics, who compared it favourably to Velaikari (1949) and Parasakthi (1952) for featuring courtroom scenes with powerful dialogues. The Tamil magazine Ananda Vikatan, in a review dated 19 February 1984, said that though the film was a remake, it was a healthy remake, and rated it 51 out of 100. Kalki praised the film for the cast performances, its theme of women boldly seeking justice instead of bowing down to male authority, and felt the film was a must watch for those craving societal change. Balumani of Anna praised the acting and direction but found the music average. The film became a major commercial success, running for over 500 days in theatres; Malathi Rangarajan of The Hindu stated that Vidhi "soared high because of its well-etched women characters, commendably enacted by Sujatha and Poornima Jayaram".

== Bibliography ==
- Balabharathi (2012). தமிழ் சினிமா 80 பாகம்-2 [Tamil Cinema 80 Part-2] (in Tamil). Chennai: Nakkheeran Publications. ISBN 978-93-81828-41-0.
- Dhananjayan, G. (2011). The Best of Tamil Cinema, 1931 to 2010: 1977–2010. Galatta Media. OCLC 733724281.
