= Kalam Vellum =

1970 film by Karnan

- Poster
- Directed by: M. Karnan
- Screenplay by: A. Gurusamy; Mathangan (dialogues)
- Story by: Mathangan
- Produced by: M. Karnan
- Starring: Jaishankar; Vijayakumari
- Cinematography: M. Karnan
- Edited by: G. Kalyanasundaram
- Music by: Shankar–Ganesh
- Production company: Indirani Films
- Release date: 11 September 1970
- Running time: 127 minutes
- Country: India
- Language: Tamil

Kalam Vellum (/kɑːləm vɛllum/ transl. Time Will Win) is a 1970 Indian Tamil-language Western film produced, filmed and directed by M. Karnan. The film stars Jaishankar, Vijayakumari and Vijaya Lalitha. It revolves around a farmer who, in his quest to avenge his sister's death, becomes a dacoit bent on revenge. The film was released on 11 September 1970.

== Plot ==
Velu, a poor farmer, loses his sister Dhanam due to the atrocities and exploitation of the village landlord Periyaraja. To avenge his sister's death, Velu kills Periyaraja's brother Chinnaraja. He then escapes from there and joins a gang of dacoits, headed by Narasingam. The gang is initially perturbed by Velu's presence, but his courage and good nature wins him their respect. Velu succeeds Narasingam as the gang leader. His aim is to rob the rich and save the poor. He is constantly looking for an opportunity to take revenge against Periyasamy. Blinded by his hunger for revenge, Velu forgets that his wife is waiting for his return to the village. Finally, Velu takes revenge on Periyaraja and surrenders to the police.

== Cast ==
- Jaishankar as Velu
- Vijayakumari as Kannamma
- Nagesh as Paavadai
- O. A. K. Thevar as Periyaraja
- M. R. R. Vasu as Chinnaraja
- Vijaya Lalitha as Rani
- Gandhimathi as Velu's mother
- Usha as Dhanam
- Shanmugasundaram as Narasingam
- Suruli Rajan
- V. Nagayya as a police officer
- Usilai Mani

== Production ==
In January 1970, several months after the release of his first film as a producer (Pennai Vazha Vidungal, August 1969), M. Karnan began pre-production on his directorial debut, Kalam Vellum. K. R. Vatsala initially shot for the role of Jaishankar's sister, which later went to Usharani.

== Soundtrack ==
The soundtrack was composed by Shankar–Ganesh, with lyrics by Kannadasan.

Track listing
No.	Title	Singer(s)	Length
1.	"Ellorum Thirudargale"	P. Susheela
2.	"Ennanga Sambandhi Eppo Namma Sambandham"	P. Susheela, T. M. Soundararajan, P. Madhuri
3.	"Maalaiyittom Pongalittom"	Sirkazhi Govindarajan, L. R. Eswari, Chorus
4.	"Penn Oru Kannadi"	L. R. Eswari

== Release and reception ==
Kalam Vellum was released on 11 September 1970. The Indian Express called it a "hotchpotch of all the adventure films that have come in Tamil and English movies that have been imported".

== Bibliography ==
- Pillai, Swarnavel Eswaran (24 April 2015). "Tamil B Movie Westerns: The Global South and Genre Subversion". The Western in the Global South. Routledge. ISBN 978-1-315-73113-1.
