= Thai Veedu =

1983 film by R. Thyagarajan

- Poster
- Directed by: R. Thyagarajan
- Written by: Thooyavan (dialogues)
- Screenplay by: Devar Films Story Dept.
- Story by: Devar Films Story Dept.
- Produced by: C. Dhandayuthapani
- Starring: Rajinikanth; Anita Raj
- Cinematography: V. Ramamoorthi
- Edited by: M. G. Balu Rao
- Music by: Shankar–Ganesh
- Production company: Devar Films
- Release date: 14 April 1983
- Running time: 140 minutes
- Country: India
- Language: Tamil

Thai Veedu (transl. Mother's House) is a 1983 Indian Tamil-language masala film directed by R. Thyagarajan, starring Rajinikanth and Anita Raj. The film, released on 14 April 1983, was simultaneously shot in Hindi as Jeet Hamaari with Rajinikanth in the same role. It was the fourth venture of Rajinikanth and Devar Films and became a commercial success in the box office.

== Plot ==
Rajasekaran (Major Sundarrajan) is a rich man who is in possession of an antique sword that holds the key to a treasure. Nagalingam (Thengai Srinivasan), a criminal, makes several unsuccessful attempts to steal the sword from Rajasekaran. On one such attempt, Anand (Jai Shankar) saves Rajasekaran and becomes his trusted man to protect the sword. Raju (Rajnikanth), an orphan who is being raised by an alcoholic ex-thief Rajasingam (M. N. Nambiar), is an expert in boosting cars, and Anita (Anita Raj) is his love interest. Several years back, Rajasingam had stolen a car owned by Nagalingam with a child inside, without knowing that the car and the child (Raju) actually belonged to Rajasekaran. One day, Rajasingam spots Nagalingam in a shopping complex, and believing that Raju is Nagalingam's son, he hands Raju to him as his own son. Nagalingam deceitfully accepts Raju as his son and cleverly employs him to steal the sword from Rajasekaran, his real father. While Raju attempts to steal the sword, Anand keeps thwarting him. Despite Anand's efforts, Raju manages to loot the sword but then discovers that he is actually the son of Rajasekaran and he himself had been instrumental in stealing his own family treasure for the wrong men. With the help of Anand, Raju fights with Nagalingam's gang to successfully retrieve their family treasure and reunites with his family.

== Cast ==
- Rajinikanth as Raju / Mohan
- Anita Raj as Anitha
- Jai Shankar as Anand
- Vijayakumar as Vijay
- M. N. Nambiar as Rajasingam
- Thengai Srinivasan as Nagalingam
- Major Sundarrajan as Rajasekaran
- Suhasini Maniratnam as Geetha
- Pandari Bai as Nirmala
- Silk Smitha as Vijay's love interest
- A. R. S as Police Commissioner
- Idichapuli Selvaraj
- Bayilvan Ranganathan
- K. Natraj as Gowtham (Guest appearance)
- Rajesh as Geetha's love interest (Guest appearance)

== Production ==
The song "Unnai Azhaithathu" was shot at Sathya Studios.

== Soundtrack ==
The music was composed by Shankar–Ganesh, with lyrics by Vaali.

Song	Singers	Length
"Aasai Nenje"	S. Janaki	6:42
"Azhagiya Kodiye Aadadi"	S. P. Balasubrahmanyam	4:40
"Mama Mama En Paarthe"	S. P. Balasubrahmanyam, S. Janaki, K. J. Yesudas	4:25
"Unnai Azhaithathu"	S. P. Balasubrahmanyam, S. Janaki	5:30
"Ival Oru Sundari"	S. P. Balasubrahmanyam, S. Janaki	4:42

== Reception ==
Kalki wrote the film can be enjoyed for three hours with family as it covers the entertainment aspect that family audience would enjoy. Rajinikanth as stylish and majestic as ever.
