= Saavi =

- Title card
- Directed by: Karthik Raghunath
- Screenplay by: Karthik Raghunath
- Produced by: J. Ravi
- Starring: Sathyaraj; Jaishankar; Saritha; Nizhalgal Ravi
- Cinematography: Ashok Choudhary
- Edited by: S. A. Murugesan
- Music by: Gangai Amaran
- Production company: Maruthi Movie Arts
- Release date: 10 October 1985
- Running time: 125 minutes
- Country: India
- Language: Tamil

Saavi (transl. The Key) is a 1985 Indian Tamil-language crime thriller written and directed by Karthik Raghunath. The film stars Sathyaraj, Jaishankar, Saritha and Nizhalgal Ravi, with music composed by Gangai Amaran. It is a remake of the 1985 Hindi film Aitbaar which in turn is based on the 1954 American classic Dial M for Murder.

== Plot ==
Vijaykumar alias Vijay, a former professional tennis player, is married to wealthy socialite Latha, who is having an affair with a stage singer named Anand. In response to Latha's complaints about his busy schedule, Vijay retires, only to secretly discover her affair. Driven by revenge and the desire to secure her wealth, Vijay plots to murder her, ensuring his comfortable lifestyle continues.

Vijay approaches his acquaintance Sathish, a part-time criminal and drug dealer. After discreetly following him, Vijay blackmails Sathish into murdering Latha. He reveals her affair, recounting how he anonymously blackmailed her six months earlier by stealing her handbag, which contained a love letter from Anand. Vijay tricks Sathish into leaving his fingerprints on the letter and offers him ₹50,000 (equivalent to ₹810,000 or US$8,400 in 2026) to kill Latha. If Sathish refuses, Vijay threatens to turn him over to the police as Latha's blackmailer.

Sathish agrees, and Vijay lays out his plan: the next evening, Vijay will take Anand to a party while Latha stays home. Vijay will leave the front door key outside, allowing Sathish to enter, hide behind the curtains by the garden's French doors, and wait until 10:50 PM. Vijay will call home from the party, prompting Latha to answer the phone, at which point Sathish will kill her, staging the scene as a botched burglary.

On the night of the plan, Sathish sneaks into the house while Latha is in bed. However, at the party, Vijay's watch stops, causing him to phone later than intended. When Latha answers, Sathish attempts to strangle her with his scarf, but she manages to grab scissors and fatally stab him. In panic, she calls Vijay, who instructs her to do nothing until he arrives. Upon returning home, Vijay contacts the police and sends Latha to bed. Before the police arrive, he transfers what he believes to be Latha's key from Sathish's pocket into her handbag, plants Anand's letter on Sathish, and replaces the scarf with Latha's stocking to frame her.

The next day, Vijay convinces Latha to omit his instruction to delay calling the police. CID Inspector Shankar questions the couple, noting discrepancies in their statements. Vijay falsely claims to have seen Sathish when Latha's handbag was stolen, suggesting Sathish duplicated her key. However, Shankar is sceptical, as no key was found on Sathish's body. Concluding Latha killed Sathish to stop his blackmail, Shankar arrests her, and she is sentenced to death.

On the eve of Latha's execution, Anand visits Vijay with a fabricated story to save her, unknowingly recounting the actual events. Concerned, Vijay dismisses the story as implausible. When Shankar arrives, Anand hides in the bedroom. Shankar questions Vijay about his recent lavish spending and tricks him into revealing the latchkey hidden in his raincoat. Anand, discovering Vijay's briefcase full of cash, deduces the money was meant for Sathish and alerts Shankar.

Vijay attempts to cover up by claiming the money was to pay off Sathish for blackmail. Shankar appears to accept the explanation, but later swaps raincoats with Vijay. As Vijay retrieves Latha's handbag from the police station, Shankar uses Vijay's key to re-enter the house, accompanied by Anand.

Latha, escorted from prison, attempts to unlock the door with the handbag key but fails. She enters through the garden, unaware of the hidden key. Shankar returns her handbag to the station. When Vijay realises he lacks a working key, he retrieves the hidden one, inadvertently proving his guilt. Surrounded by Shankar and officers, Vijay fires his gun in a final act of defiance and dies.

== Cast ==
- Sathyaraj as Vijaykumar
- Jaishankar as CID Inspector Shankar
- Saritha as Latha
- Nizhalgal Ravi as Anand
- Amjathkumar as Sathish (or) Sumkumar
- V. Gopalakrishnan as Public Prosecutor
- Kallapetti Singaram as Cash Box Singaram
- Gandhimathi as Pachaiyamma
- Ennatha Kannaiah as Press Reporter
- Anuradha in item number
- Disco Shanti in item number

== Production ==
Saavi marked Sathyaraj's first leading role, though his character carried negative shades.

== Soundtrack ==
Music was by Gangai Amaran and lyrics were by Vaali.

Track listing
No.	Title	Singer(s)	Length
1.	"Thendrale Thendrale Nee Ennai"	S. P. Balasubrahmanyam, S. Janaki
2.	"Neengatha Gnabagam Nenjile"	S. P. Balasubrahmanyam, S. Janaki
3.	"Thanjavooru Malligai Idhu"	S. Janaki

== Release and reception ==
Saavi was released on 10 October 1985. Jayamanmadhan of Kalki called it a different film but noted that it would have been an interesting film if the length had been reduced at the right places.
