= Maanavan =

1970 film by M. A. Thirumugam

- Poster
- Directed by: M. A. Thirumugam
- Story by: Balamurugan
- Produced by: Sandow M. M. A. Chinnappa Thevar
- Starring: Jaishankar; R. Muthuraman; Lakshmi; Sowcar Janaki
- Cinematography: T. M. Sundara Babu; V. Selvaraj
- Edited by: M. A. Thirumugam; M. G. Balu Rao; R. Thyagarajan; C. Dhandayudhapani
- Music by: Shankar–Ganesh
- Production company: Dhandayudhapani Films
- Release date: 10 July 1970
- Running time: 130 minutes
- Country: India
- Language: Tamil

Maanavan (transl. Student) is a 1970 Indian Tamil-language coming-of-age drama film directed by M. A. Thirumugam and produced by Sandow M. M. A. Chinnappa Thevar under Dhandayudhapani Films. The scripts were written by Balamurugan. The film starred Jaishankar and Muthuraman with Sowcar Janaki, Lakshmi, Nagesh and Sachu in supporting roles. Kamal Haasan appears only for a dance sequence along with Kutty Padmini. Hassan returns to Cinema as a teen actor after a seven-year hiatus. The film also marks the debut of many character actors and comedians like Pandu, Kathadi Ramamurthy among others.

== Plot ==
Kathiresan is the son of Parvathi, a maid at the Panchayat president's (O.A.K.Thevar) house and her husband (S.A.Ashokan) is a cattle herder. In a fight about gambling debts, his father kills a man and runs away with the police on his tail. He is later arrested, tried and sentences to life imprisonment. Ravi, the son of Panchayat president of Salaiyur village in Chingleput District, is Kathiresan's classmate. Ravi bullies Kathiresan and is not good at studies, while Kathiresan excels in it. Being jealous of this, the Panchayat president wants Kathiresan to quit studying and be a cattle herder. But Parvathi is intent on Kathiresan being educated and relocates to Madras. She becomes a maid in a school and a worker in a rice mill. With great difficulty Kathiresan studies well and gets admitted to a college. To help pay his fees, he works as a cycle-rickshaw puller.

Ravi, who grew up to be a playboy, is enrolled in the same college as Kathiresan. Kathiresan and Shanthi, who is the college-going daughter of Judge Satyamurthy, fall in love with each other. He passes his M.A with distinction and gets a job as a lecturer in the same college while preparing for his IAS entrance exams, which Ravi dislikes. Ravi finally gets dismissed from college due to his bad behavior. In revenge, he kills a student, Mani, and frames Kathiresan.

Ravi is ultimately found responsible for the murder and sent to the same jail as Kathiresan's father for life imprisonment. Kathiresan becomes an IAS officer and ends up coming to the same jail for inspection.

Kathiresan's father is released from jail and learns that his son is now an IAS officer. Ravi's father tries to assassinate Kathiresan with a bomb at a village function but is saved by Kathiresan. They are all reunited.

The comedy track is provided by Ramu (a rickshaw puller turned car driver) and his lover.

== Cast ==
- Jaishankar as Kathiresan
- R. Muthuraman as Ravi
- Lakshmi as Shanthi
- Nagesh as Ramu
- S.A. Ashokan as Kathiresan's father
- Sowkar Janaki as Parvathy
- Major Sundararajan as Judge Satyamurthy
- V. S. Raghavan as College principal
- O. A. K. Thevar as Ravi's father / Panchayat president
- Sachu as Ramu's wife
- Master Prabhakar as Young ravi
- Sandow M. M. A. Chinnappa Thevar
- Senthamarai as School teacher
- Thengai Srinivasan as Mayandi
- Pandu as Dimki
- Kathadi Ramamurthy as Ravi's friend
- T. K. S. Natarajan as Bus passenger
- Vellai Subbaiah as Student
- Jayakumari
- Master Krishnakumar as Young kathiresan
- Radhabhai

Guest appearances in the song "Visiladichan Kunjugala"

- Kamal Haasan as Student
- Kutty Padmini as Student

== Soundtrack ==
Music was by Shankar–Ganesh. The song "Chinna Chinna Pappa" urges people not to be slow or stubborn, also not to sleep in the day or forget their service to society.

Title	Lyricist	Singer(s)	Length
"Chinna Chinna Pappa"	Tirchy Thyagarajan	P. Susheela	03:52
"One and Two Mudhal"	Tirchy Thyagarajan	L. R. Eswari	
"Kalyaana Ramanukkum"	Vaali	S. P. Balasubrahmanyam, P. Susheela	03:26
"Visiladichan Kunjugala"	Mariappa	T. M. Soundararajan, P. Susheela	03:40

== Release and reception ==
Maanavan was released on 10 July 1970. The Indian Express called it "obviously an attempt to educate the students to be on their best behaviour". The reviewer praised the performances of the actors, saying Sowcar Janaki "stands out amongst the cast" while Muthuraman "puts in a breezy performance".
