= Naanum Oru Thozhilali =

- Theatrical release poster
- Directed by: C. V. Sridhar
- Written by: C. V. Sridhar
- Produced by: C. V. Sridhar
- Starring: Kamal Haasan; Ambika; Jaishankar
- Cinematography: P. Bhaskar Rao
- Edited by: M. Umanath
- Music by: Ilaiyaraaja
- Production company: Chitralaya
- Release dates: 1 May 1986 (Tamil); 3 July 1987 (Telugu)
- Country: India
- Languages: Tamil; Telugu

Naanum Oru Thozhilali (transl. I am also a worker) is a 1986 Indian Tamil-language masala film written, directed and produced by C. V. Sridhar. The film stars Kamal Haasan and Ambika, while Jaishankar, V. S. Raghavan and Devika play supporting roles. The film was also simultaneously shot in Telugu as Andarikante Ghanudu (transl. The toughest of all). Murali Mohan plays supporting role in Telugu version. The Tamil version was released on 1 May 1986. The film was a box office failure.

== Plot ==
Bharath returns to India from his studies abroad after his father Yoganand dies in a car accident. The family's factory is run by the father and son team of Rammohan and Sundar. They loot from the factory and treat the workers poorly. Kumar works at the factory and often clashes with Rammohan and Sundar. The duo accused Kumar's older brother of running away with stolen company cash but Kumar does not believe this. He is also suspicious of Yoganand's death and is trying to investigate.

Soon after his arrival in India, Bharath falls in love with factory worker Meena. He also quickly realises that something is amiss with the factory and his father's accident. With the help of Meena, he poses as factory worker Raju to investigate matters. He soon learns that Kumar is an ally and the two work together to get to the bottom of the mystery.

== Cast ==
- Kamal Haasan as Bharath/Raju
- Ambika as Meena
- Jaishankar as Sundar
- Rajeev as Kumar
- Murali Mohan (Telugu version)
- V. S. Raghavan as Rammohan
- Veera Raghavan as Yoganand
- Vennira Aadai Moorthy as Pakkiri's assistant
- Loose Mohan as Pakkiri
- T. K. S. Chandran
- Prasad Babu
- Thara Krishnan
- C. R. Vijayakumari as Kumar's sister in law
- Devika as Bharath's mother
- Sadhana as Padma
- Vijaya
- Deepa in a special appearance for Mandaveli song

== Production ==
The film was launched by C. V. Sridhar in 1980 as a Cinemascope venture and was then titled as Sakthi. Sridhar collaborated with Kamal Haasan after the success of the 1978 film Ilamai Oonjal Aadukirathu. The film was meant to be the first film which featured Haasan and Ambika as a lead pair and stills were released featuring Ambika in a swimsuit. The film got delayed and was put on hold, before it re-emerged in 1986 under the title of Meendum Suryodayam (transl. The sun rises again) and shooting progressed. It was planned for an April 1986 release, which got postponed to 1 May 1986. There was a local council election in March 1986 and the Dravida Munnetra Kazhagam (DMK) won seats. Sridhar felt the title Meendum Suryodayam would imply that the filmmakers were welcoming the DMK's re-emergence, whose symbol is that of a rising sun. Hence the title was changed to Naanum Oru Thozhilali. Sridhar had previously started a film with the same title in the mid-1970s, with M. G. Ramachandran in the lead; that film was shelved.

== Soundtrack ==
The music was composed by Ilaiyaraaja, with lyrics by Vaali.

Tamil Track list
No.	Title	Singer(s)	Length
1.	"Aayirathil Nee Oruthan"	S. Janaki	4:14
2.	"Angel Aadum Angel"	P. Susheela	4:29
3.	"Mandaveli"	S. P. Balasubrahmanyam	3:15
4.	"Naan Pooveduthu"	S. P. Balasubramanyam, S. Janaki	4:37
5.	"Oru Nilavum Malarum"	S. P. Balasubrahmanyam, S. Janaki	4:32
6.	"Pattu Poove"	S. P. Balasubrahmanyam	4:30
7.	"Sembaruthi Poove"	S. P. Balasubrahmanyam, S. Janaki	4:41
Total length:			30:18

== Release and reception ==
Naanum Oru Thozhilali released on 1 May 1986, Labour Day. The Telugu-language version Andarikante Ghanudu released one year later on 3 July 1987. The film was also dubbed in Kannada as Sooryodaya, but that did not have a theatrical release. Jayamanmadhan of Kalki criticised the director for assuming that Haasan, Ambika, the stunts and songs were enough for the film's success as audiences would not feel the same.
