= Poova Thalaiya (1969 film) =

1969 film by K. Balachander

- Poster
- Directed by: K. Balachander
- Written by: K. Balachander
- Produced by: Rama. Arangakannal
- Starring: Gemini Ganesh; Jaishankar; Nagesh; S. Varalakshmi; Rajasree; Vennira Aadai Nirmala
- Cinematography: N. Balakrishnan
- Edited by: N. R. Kittu
- Music by: M. S. Viswanathan
- Production company: Arul Films
- Release date: 10 May 1969
- Running time: 150 minutes
- Country: India
- Language: Tamil

Poova Thalaiya (transl. Heads or Tails?) is a 1969 Indian Tamil-language comedy film written and directed by K. Balachander, and produced by Rama. Arangakannal. The film stars Gemini Ganesh, Jaishankar, Nagesh, S. Varalakshmi, Rajasree and Vennira Aadai Nirmala. It was released on 10 May 1969. The film was remade in Telugu in 1971 as Bomma Borusa, in Malayalam in 1978 as Balapareekshanam and in Kannada in 1985 as Balondu Uyyale. It was also an influence on the 2000 Tamil film Kandha Kadamba Kathir Vela.

== Plot ==
Ganesan is a wealthy widower who is constantly under the overbearing control of his arrogant mother-in-law, Parvathamma. Parvathamma manipulating her family affairs to ensure her authority remains absolute.

Ganesan's younger brother Shankar falls in love with Parvathamma's youngest daughter Nirmala. Recognizing that Parvathamma will never willingly allow the marriage—or tolerate anyone defying her reign—Shankar chooses to tackle the matriarch head-on. What follows is a chaotic battle of wits and a game of strategic upmanship between the stubborn Parvathamma and the clever Shankar.

== Cast ==
- Gemini Ganesh as Ganesan
- Jaishankar as Shankar
- Nagesh as Nagesh
- S. Varalakshmi as Parvathamma
- Rajasri as Raji
- Vennira Aadai Nirmala as Nirmala
- Srikanth as Nagamma's son
- M. R. R. Vasu as the hotel manager
- S. Rama Rao as Indra's father
- J. Balayya
- Manorama as Indra
- Sachu as Saraswathi
- T. P. Muthulakshmi as Nagamma
- Parvathy as Indra's mother

== Production ==
The film was primarily shot at AVM Studios, and the three lead actors' characters were named after themselves.

== Soundtrack ==
The music was composed by M. S. Viswanathan, with lyrics by Vaali. The title song is set to the raga Mohanam, and "Maduraiyil Parandha" is set to Kalyani.

Song	Singers	Length
"Adi Sarithan Podi"	T. M. Soundararajan, L. R. Eswari	03:50
"Madhurayil Parantha"	T. M. Soundararajan	03:58
"Paladai Meni"	P. Susheela, L. R. Eswari	04:28
"Poda Chonnal Pottu"	T. M. Soundararajan, Manorama, A. L. Raghavan	05:43
"Poova Thalaiya"	T. M. Soundararajan, Sirkazhi Govindarajan	04:21

== Release and reception ==
Poova Thalaiya was released on 10 May 1969. The Indian Express called the film "an all-out attempt at comedy and it succeeds reasonably well", but said Balachander's direction had "not come up with the standard of his previous films".
