= Ethirkalam =

1970 film by M. S. Solaimalai

- Theatrical release poster
- Directed by: M. S. Solaimalai
- Written by: M. S. Solaimalai
- Produced by: M. Solai Rajendran
- Starring: Gemini Ganesan; Padmini; Jaishankar; Vanisri
- Cinematography: W. R. Subba Rao
- Edited by: R. Devarajan
- Music by: M. S. Viswanathan
- Production company: Thanigaivel Pictures
- Release date: 21 February 1970
- Country: India
- Language: Tamil

Ethirkalam (transl. Future) is a 1970 Indian Tamil-language film written and directed by M. S. Solaimalai and produced by M. S. Rajendran. The film stars Gemini Ganesan, Padmini, Jaishankar and Vanisri. It was released on 21 February 1970.

== Cast ==
- Gemini Ganesan
- Padmini
- Jaishankar
- Vanisri
- Nagesh
- T. S. Balaiah
- K. Balaji
- Suruli Rajan
- S. N. Lakshmi
- Ragini

== Soundtrack ==
The music was composed by M. S. Viswanathan, with lyrics by Kannadasan.

| Song | Singers | Length |
|---|---|---|
| "Vazndhu Parppom Raa Naina" | T. M. Soundararajan, L. R. Eswari | 05:06 |
| "Mounam Than Pesiyadho" | L. R. Eswari | 03:23 |
| "Kallukku Neethi Solla Mudiyathu" | T. M. Soundararajan | 04:30 |
| "Ponnu Yen Thane Sirikkuthu" | T. M. Soundararajan, P. Susheela | 04:27 |
| "Majaa Majaa Maappillai" | T. M. Soundararajan, P. Susheela | 04:13 |

== Release and reception ==
Ethirkalam was released on 21 February 1970. The Indian Express wrote it "appears to be a film shot during different decades. It has so many stories in it that it is like a book of short stories, pleasant and unpleasant [...] It has all the ingredients that are mistaken for box-office success – car chase, stick fights, fist fights, romantic dance sequences etc."
