= Nawab Naarkali =

- Poster
- Directed by: C. V. Rajendran
- Story by: Komal Swaminathan
- Produced by: K. Balakrishnan
- Starring: Jaishankar; Lakshmi; Rama Prabha; Nagesh
- Cinematography: P. Bhaskar Rao
- Edited by: N. M. Sankar
- Music by: M. S. Viswanathan
- Production company: Vijay Picture
- Release date: 3 March 1972
- Running time: 139 minutes
- Country: India
- Language: Tamil

Nawab Naarkali (/nəwɑːb nɑːrkɑːli/ transl. The Nawab's chair) is a 1972 Indian Tamil-language comedy film, directed by C. V. Rajendran. The film stars Jaishankar and Nagesh, with Lakshmi, Rama Prabha and V. K. Ramasamy, S. V. Sahasranamam and V. S. Raghavan playing supporting roles. It is based on the play of the same name, written by Komal Swaminathan. The film was released on 3 March 1972.

== Plot ==
Appaasaami, an appalam merchant and his wife Bhaakyam, are a childless couple. Ravi, a law college student, who is also a football player, works part-time, distributing newspapers to houses and as a tutor for managing his educational and accommodation expenses. Thaandavam has a large family, including his wife, son Subbu and nine other children. Kaanchana, whose manager is Naesamani Ponnaiyaa, lives with her father Raajavaelu, a man with mental disorientation and is looked after by Nurse Christy. Raajavaelu came to this state because he lost ₹2 lakh (equivalent to ₹90 lakh or US$93,000 in 2023) given by Naesamani Ponnaiyaa in Kolkata Palace Hotel. One time, Subbu requests his father Thaandavam to give ₹25 (equivalent to ₹1,100 or US$12 in 2023) to watch an English film but he refuses. So Subbu steals a seemingly old chair from their house, which unbeknownst to him, but known to his father and mother, is a magical Nawab's chair, and sells it at an auction shop for ₹25. The auction shop owner sells the chair for ₹250 (equivalent to ₹11,000 or US$120 in 2023) to Appaasaami telling that the chair, once owned by the Nawab, blessed the Nawab with many kids. Hearing this Appaasami brings the chair to his house. Meanwhile, Thaandavam, on hearing that the chair was sold to auction shop and later to Appaasami, sends his son, Subbu, out of the house. Thaandavam makes a plan to steal the chair from Appaasami's house. So he portrays himself as a sadhu and forgetting that he chased Subbu out of his house, tells Appaasami that in order to bear a child, Appaasami must have a family with 10 kids to live in their house as tenants. Ravi, at this time, comes to meet Thaandavam for accommodation. Thaandavam requests Ravi to act as his son and they all enter Appaasami's house. Believing that Ravi has stolen that ₹2 lakh from her father, Kaanchana joins Thaandavam as his sister's daughter and enters Appaasami's house, though she later realises that Ravi did not steal that money. Her suspicion then falls on Appaasami and Subbu, but on inquiry it is found that they are also innocent. One day, Ravi sees three people trying to steal the Nawab's chair with the help someone signalling with a handkerchief from within the house. He decides to play a drama and tears off the chair seat, from which Raajavelu's stolen money flies from where it was stashed. Thaandavam claims it to be his money, but on inquiry, he says that money was given by Raajavelu. Unconvinced, Thaandavam is taken to Raajavelu's house. On hearing the news that money has been found but can no longer be retrieved, Raajavelu, who has been acting as a mad man, truly becomes mad. Ravi then decides to give the money to the government as it is black money. After Thaandavam's ploy is revealed, Appaasami decides to throw Thaandavam and his family out, but on hearing that his wife is pregnant, he changes his mind and requests everyone to stay with him.

== Cast ==
- Jaishankar as Ravi
- Lakshmi as Kanchana
- Rama Prabha as Nurse Christy
- Nagesh as Subbu
- V. S. Raghavan as Raajavelu
- S. V. Sahasranamam as Thaandavam
- Gandhimathi as Thaandavam's wife
- V. K. Ramasamy as Appaasami
- A. R. Srinivasan as Naesamani Ponnaiyaa
- S. N. Parvathy as Bhaakyam
- Samikkannu as Rent collector
- A. K. Veerasamy as Auctioneer
- Kullamani as Subbu's brother

== Production ==
Nawab Naarkali is based on the play of the same name by Komal Swaminathan. Kullamani made his acting debut with this film portraying Nagesh's brother.

== Soundtrack ==
The music was composed by M. S. Viswanathan and the lyrics were written by Kannadasan. The song "Chappathi Chappathi Thaan" attained popularity.

Song	Singer	Length
"Chappathi Chappathi Thaan"	A. L. Raghavan L. R. Anjali	3:18
"Ponnar Meniyane"	M. S. Viswanathan	
"Yemma Kanna Athisayama"	L. R. Eswari	
"Yendi Kanna Athisayama"	L. R. Eswari	
"Senjikottaiyai"	T. M. Soundararajan L. R. Anjali & S. C. Krishnan	

== Reception ==
Theekkathir appreciated the film for its humour.

== In other media ==
The scene where Rama Prabha's character misreads the name "Naesamani Ponnaiyaa" as "Naasama Nee Poniya" was re-enacted by Janagaraj in Annaamalai (1992).

== Bibliography ==
- Dharap, B. V. (1973). Indian Films. Allied Publishers. OCLC 1790604.
- Manian, Aranthai (2020). திரைப்படங்களான இலக்கியங்களும் நாடகங்களும் (in Tamil). Pustaka Digital Media. OCLC 702269583.
