= Ponvandu =

- Poster
- Directed by: N. S. Maniam
- Written by: N. S. Maniam
- Produced by: N. S. Maniam
- Starring: Jaishankar; Bharathi; Usha Nandini; Shubha; Jayachitra
- Cinematography: C. Ramachandran
- Edited by: R. Devarajan
- Music by: V. Kumar
- Production company: Maniam Pictures
- Release date: 29 June 1973
- Running time: 120 minutes
- Country: India
- Language: Tamil

Ponvandu (transl. Golden Beetle) is 1973 Indian Tamil-language comedy film written, produced and directed by N. S. Maniam. The film stars Jaishankar, Bharathi, Usha Nandini, Shubha and Jayachitra. It was released on 29 June 1973.

== Cast ==
- Jaishankar as Kannan
- Bharathi as Leela
- Usha Nandini as Sathya Bama
- Shubha as Rukmani
- Jayachitra as Radha
- Manorama as Rathna Devi
- Thengai Srinivasan as Rukmani's father
- Cho as Sikkal Singaravelan
- Suruli Rajan as Gothandam
- Vennira Aadai Moorthy as Kumar
- S. A. Ashokan as Kannan's father (guest appearance)
- Srikanth as Pichandi (guest appearance)
- M. N. Rajam as Kamala (guest appearance)
- Sachu as Vasantha (guest appearance)
- P. R. Varalakshmi as Lakshmi (guest appearance)
- Jayakumari as Prema (guest appearance)
- Kalpana as Mangamma (guest appearance)

== Production ==
Two songs and fight sequences were filmed at Kodaikanal.

== Soundtrack ==
The music was composed by V. Kumar and lyrics were written by Vaali and Alangudi Somu.

Track listing
No.	Title	Singer(s)	Length
1.	"Naan Oru Thani Ragam"	L. R. Eswari, T. M. Soundararajan	4:14
2.	"Pani Malaro"	T. M. Soundararajan	3:33
3.	"Adi Vaadiyamma"	T. M. Soundararajan, P. Susheela, L. R. Eswari, K. Swarna	5:07
Total length:			12:54

== Critical reception ==
Kanthan of Kalki appreciated the performances of Jaishankar, Manorama and humour of Cho, Suruli Rajan, Srinivasan and Moorthy but panned Bharathi's makeup and costumes. Navamani praised the acting and humour.
