= Jaishankar (actor) =

Indian actor (1938–2000)

- Jaishankar's still from a movie
- Born: Shankar Subramaniyan Iyer; 12 July 1938; Thirunelveli, Madras Presidency, British India
- Died: 3 June 2000 (aged 61); Chennai, Tamil Nadu, India
- Other names: Makkal Kalaingnar, Thennagathu James Bond
- Occupation: Actor
- Years active: 1965–2000
- Works: Full list
- Spouse: Geetha Shankar (m. 1967)
- Children: 3

Jaishankar (born Shankar Subramaniyan Iyer on 12 July 1938, died 3 June 2000) was an Indian actor known for his work in Tamil cinema. He was a notable lead actor in the 1960s and 70s, who was credited onscreen with title of Makkal Kalaingnar (people's artiste) or Makkal Thamizhan (people's Tamil) in most of the films starring him. He was also referred to as Thennakathu James Bond (South Indian James Bond) because of his roles in films such as Vallavan Oruvan and CID Shankar.

== Biography ==
Jaishankar, whose real name was Shankar hailed from Kumbakonam, but was born in Thirunelveli to parents Subramaniyan Iyer who was the Judge of Thirunelveli court and Yogambal on 12 July 1938. Jaishankar did his schooling in P.S. Higher Secondary School, Mylapore, and completed his graduation from The New College, Chennai, where he was awarded an honours degree. He studied law but gave it up after a year because of his interests in the theater and other art forms.

He joined Cho Ramaswamy's "Cho's Viveka Fine Arts", which consisted mostly of Mylaporeans where he did insignificantly small roles. He wasn't happy as he was interested in exploring his acting skills. As a result, he moved out of the troupe and eventually joined Koothabiran's "Kalki Fine Arts" where he made a mark by playing one of the lead roles in Kalki's 'Amara Thaara'.

== Career ==
In an era dominated by Sivaji Ganesan, M. G. Ramachandran and Gemini Ganesan, he created his own niche with portrayals of Westernised characters. He was popularly known as South Indian James Bond because of his roles as the investigative detective in Vallavan Oruvan and CID Shankar, and "Friday star" because he invariably had a release every week. He was also adept at comedy and contemporary portrayals as seen in Pattanathil Bhootham, Noottrukku Nooru and Kuzhandaiyum Deivamum.Among his more memorable roles was the teacher's role in the K Balachander film, Noothukku Nooru. His first film was Iravum Pagalum, which had also been the title of his debut film song. With the emergence of Rajinikanth and Kamal Haasan, he began to mostly play villain and father roles in many films, among them Murattu Kaalai, Apoorva Sagodharargal and Thalapathi.

=== Early career (1965–1968) ===
Jaishankar made his film debut in 1965, in the film Iravum Pagalum directed by Joseph Thaliath Jr. The film was released on 14 January 1965 Thai Pongal day. Despite facing competition from Enga Veettu Pillai and Pazhani, released on the same day, the film become a commercial success." Generally starring romance, comedy and action films (especially played in investigative detective). In followed year he acted Enga Veetu Penn (1965), and Panchavarna Kili, where he played in a dual role, and both the films become a commercial success. Jaishankar starred in Kuzhandaiyum Deivamum (1965), where he played estranged husband. Adaptation of Disney's The Parent Trap directed by Krishnan–Panju produced by AVM Productions. It was commercial success and won the National Film Award for Best Feature Film in Tamil, and in Nee, he played college student and also he paired with Jayalalithaa for first time and film become a commercial success. In 1966 he acted Psychological thriller film Yaar Nee?, the film produced by P. S. Veerappa, it was remake of Hindi film Woh Kaun Thi? (1964). The film becomes successful at the box-office. He continued to achieve success at the box-office with films like Naam Moovar, Kadhal Paduthum Paadu, and Gowri Kalyanam (they released in 1966). Jaishankar worked under Modern Theatres films including Iru Vallavargal (1966), the film remake of Hindi film Do Ustad. Vallavan Oruvan (1966), where he played Investigative officer CID Shankar on the death of his colleagues and the film loosely based on 1964 French-Italian film Shadow of Evil. It becomes a major success at the box-office. Kadhalithal Podhuma (1967), the film was hit at the box-office. In 1967 he acted romantic-comic fantasy film Pattanathil Bhootham starred with K. R. Vijaya, the film heavily inspired by the 1964 American film The Brass Bottle and the film directed by M. V. Raman, and the film released on Tamil Puthandu. Despite facing competition from Magaraasi, released on same day, it become a major successful at the box-office. Naangu Killadigal, he played escaped prisoner with his inmates, according to Indian Express the film did not well at the box-office. Neelagiri Express (1968), where he played CID investigative officer and the assigned the task of nabbing the criminals behind the murder. The film was remake of Malayalam film Cochin Expressand the film becomes blockbuster hit at the box-office.

=== Stardom (1969–1979) ===
In 1968, he acted comedy film Bommalattam, romantic film Muthu Chippi, and family-drama film Uyira Maanama and Jeevanamsam, he starred with C. R. Vijayakumari and actress Lakshmi debut on the film, she played shankar's sister role, all films becomes major hit at the box-office. In 1969 he acted in a comedy film Poova Thalaiya, where he played the role of a successful son-in-law, Who will compete with an arrogant aunt. The film was a box-office success, running for 100 days in many centres of Tamil Nadu and also all over India. In same year he gives another major success films such as Akka Thangai, he played suspected brother and the film directed by M. A. Thirumugam. It becomes huge hit at the box-office and won the Tamil Nadu Film Award for Best Film (Second Prize). And Mannippu, where he played artist and falsely charged his finance missing case, it becomes a successful at the box-office and the film was remake of Malayalam film Padunna Puzha.

In Maanavan (1970), where he played a young man who becomes a district administrator from the poverty level. Maanavan proves commercial success. In 1970, he acted in the family drama film Penn Deivam, and a comedy film Veettuku Veedu, the film based on the play Thikku Theriyadha Veettil and later 2001 Viswanathan Ramamoorthy based on this film. And he starred in Ethirkalam with Gemini Ganesan and he acted Western-adventure film Kalam Vellum (1970), all the films becomes successfully hit at the box-office.CID Shankar (1970), where he played to investigate a case of mysterious murder and finds clues leading to group of terrorists, it was an adaptation of 1965 French-Italian film OSS 117 Mission for a Killer. Nootrukku Nooru (1971), where he played a college professor, who is accused by three college girls of sexual harassment, the film directed by K. Balachander under his production Kalakendra. The film was a milestone of Shankar's career and he won the Film Fans Association Best Actor Award in 1971. Karundhel Kannayiram (1972), where he played when he is falsely accused of a crime and force to prove his innocence. In followed year he acted western-cowboy film Ganga, it becomes a commercial success and his acted comedy-suspense film Nawab Naarkali, in which he played financial stress law college student. The film adaptation of Komal Swaminathan's stage play of the same name and it becomes successful hit at the box-office. Thedi Vandha Lakshmi (1973), Jakkamma (1973), both was hit at the box-office. He acted in 1973 comedy-melodrama film Ponvandu, where he played wealthy young man, who spends as an expense, who become challenge to his father, will be able not earn money without his father kindness. Jaishankar partially romance with Manorama in this film. And his 100th film was Idhayam Parakindrathu In 1974 he acted thriller film Vairam, the film recorded at the super hit and followed he gives box-office success films Kaliyuga Kannan and Athaiya Mamiya. His 1977 film Avar Enakke Sondham is credited with ushering disco music era in Tamil cinema with the smash-hit single Surangani composed by newcomer Ilayaraja.

=== Later career (1980–1999) ===
Between 1980 and 1999 Jaishankar emerged with latest actors like Rajinikanth, Kamal Haasan, Vijayakanth, Sathyaraj, Thiagarajan, Mohan, Prabhu, Arjun and played lead villain and in character role. In film Murattu Kalai (1980), he reprise Villain role and co-starred with Rajinikanth. In film Vidhi (1984), he played rich criminal Lawyer and father of playboy Son, the film becomes Commercial Success. In 1984, he acted thriller film 24 Mani Neram, where he played investigating officer, the film directed by Manivannan and the same year he worked under Balu Mahendra's film Neengal Kettavai. In 1985 he played actress Nadhiya father role in Poove Poochooda Vaa directed by Fazil. In followed he acted horror-thriller films as Yaar? and Pillai Nila (both released in 1985) and he played crime thriller film Saavi, which he played CID Inspector and solve the murder case. The film based on American film Dial M for Murder. The film commercial hit at the box-office. In a film Oomai Vizhigal (1986), where he played who runs unprofitable Magazine Dhinamurasu, he was an editor of the magazine, the film made by Film college student and run over 100+ days in theatre. In following 1989, he acted science fiction-horror film Naalai Manithan, which he played mad scientist invents as drug which gives back life to dead if injected within two hours of dead, it becomes profitable venture.

Jaishankar emerged with Rajinikanth in fifteen films – Gaayathri, Murattu Kaalai, Garjanai, Thanikattu Raja, Paayum Puli, Thudikkum Karangal, Thai Veedu, Adutha Varisu, Thanga Magan, Anbulla Rajinikanth, Padikkadavan, Maaveeran, Mappillai, Thalapathi, Arunachalam.

Jaishankar emergence with Kamal Haasan in nine films – Cinema Paithiyam, Savaal, Ellam Inba Mayyam, Vazhvey Maayam, Sattam, Naanum Oru Thozhilali, Kadhal Parisu, Apoorva Sagodharargal, Singaravelan.

=== Collaborations ===
He has worked with many actresses including C. R. Vijayakumari, Jamuna, Rajasulochana, C. Vasantha, Jayalalithaa, K. R. Vijaya, Manorama, Lakshmi, Devika, Bharathi, Vanisri, Rajasri, Venniradai Nirmala, L. Vijayalakshmi, Ushanandini, Jayachitra, Shubha, Vijayanirmala of his time. Other actresses include A. Sakunthala, Vijayalalitha, Jayakumari, Srividya, Sridevi, Sripriya and Silk Smitha. He also co-starred with other actors such as Sivaji Ganesan, Gemini Ganesan, R. Muthuraman, Ravichandran, A. V. M. Rajan, Srikanth, Sivakumar, Cho, Nagesh, S. V. Ranga Rao, S. A. Ashokan, R. S. Manohar, S. V. Ramadoss, Major Sundarrajan, P. S. Veerappa, O. A. K. Thevar, K. Balaji, Rajinikanth, Kamal Haasan, Vijayakanth, Thiagarajan, Sathyaraj, Nizhalgal Ravi, Arjun, Karthik, Mohan and Vijay.

== Death ==
Jaishankar died of heart attack on 3 June 2000, at the age of 61 in Chennai.

== Medical trust ==
He is also remembered for his philanthropy as he helped the needy without any publicity. Each year his son, Dr.Vijay Shankar, conducts 15 free eye surgeries on his father's birthday. He planned to create a trust in his father's memory and conduct these camps on a larger scale and later include some more specialities like cardiac surgeries also.
