= List of people associated with Thanjavur district =

This is a list of notable people associated with Thanjavur district in Tamil Nadu, India

== Academics ==
- Sakkottai Krishnaswami Aiyangar (1871–1947), Indian historian and Dravidologist.
- Srinivasa Ramanujan (1887–1920), Indian mathematician. Regarded amongst the world's greatest mathematicians.
- U. V. Swaminatha Iyer(1855–1942), Tamil scholar, linguist, and music composer.
- P. Dawood shah (1885–1969) Tamil Scholar and activist.

== Religious and spiritual leaders ==
- Abirami Pattar (c. 18th century), was a Tamil saint and poet. Author of Abirami Anthathi and Hindu religious works in Tamil.
- Swami Smaranananda (born 1929), spiritual leader, 16th President, Ramakrishna Math and Ramakrishna Mission.
- Sri Sri Ravi Shankar (born 1956), spiritual leader, yogi, and founder of 'Art of Living'.

== Administrators ==
- Sir T. Madhava Rao (1828–1891), Diwan of Travancore from 1857 to 1872, and an early leader of the Indian National Congress.
- T. Venkata Rao, Diwan of Travancore from 1821 to 1829 and 1838 to 1839.
- T. Ananda Rao (1852–1919), Indian administrator. Diwan of Mysore from 1909 to 1912. Son of Sir T. Madhava Rao.
- V. P. Madhava Rao (1850–1934), Indian administrator. Diwan of Mysore from 1906 to 1909 and Baroda from 1910 to 1913.

== Journalists ==
- G. A. Natesan (1873–1948), Indian journalist and publisher. Founder of publishing company G. A. Natesan & Co. and editor of The Indian Review.

== Artists ==
- N. Srinivasan, Artist famous for digital paintings, who have received Kalaimamani award in 2009.

== Film artists ==
- T. R. Rajakumari (1922–1999)
- Sivaji Ganesan (1928–2001)
- Vijayakumar (Tamil actor)
- Hema Malini
- Rajesh
- Prabhu
- S. Shankar
- Sukanya
- Arvind Swami
- Dhivyadharshini
- Snehan

== Political leaders ==
- Ko. Si. Mani (b. 1929), Minister in the Tamil Nadu State Government.
- G. K. Vasan (b. 1964), Cabinet Minister in the Government of India.Rajya Sabha Member. Leader of Tamil Manilaa Congress.
- G. K. Moopanar (1931–2001), Tamil politician and leader of the Indian National Congress. Founder of the Tamil Manilaa Congress.
- A Y S Parisutham Nadar (1909–1985), member of the Indian National Congress, MLA in 1946–1952, 1957–1962, and 1967–1971. Municipal Chairman, 1959–1961.
- S. Muthiah Mudaliar (1883–1953), Indian politician of the Justice Party, and, later, the Swaraj Party. Minister of education and excise for the Madras Presidency from 1928 to 1930.
- Sir P. S. Sivaswami Iyer (1864–1946), Indian lawyer. Advocate General of Madras Presidency from 1907 to 1911.
- V. S. Srinivasa Sastri (1869–1946), Indian freedom fighter, orator and teacher. Was called the "Silver Tongued Orator of the British Empire" by Winston Churchill.
- S. A. Saminatha Iyer (d. 1899), Indian lawyer and freedom-fighter.
- R. Venkataraman (1910–2009), Indian politician and freedom fighter. Served as the 8th President of India (1987–1992); Vice-president of India (1984–1987)
- M.Karunanidhi (1924-2018), Indian Politician. Served as Chief Minister of Tamil Nadu five times
- Adanjur A.Singaravel viruthullar (1898-1960), Congress leader and member of Thanjavur district board (consisting of Nagapattinam, thiruvarur and pudukottai) from 1949 to 1959.
- R. Swaminatha Merkondar, a member of the Indian National Congress party, represented the District of Uthiramerur in the Madras Assembly from 1957 to 1962 representing the Tiruvaiyaru constituency.
- M. Ramkumar, is an Indian politician and former Member of the Legislative Assembly of Tamil Nadu. He was the chairman district panchayat (Thanjavur district) from 1996 to 2001.
- A. Vaidyanatha Iyer

== Sports ==
- Varun Chakravarthy, Indian cricketer.
