= Aathi Parasakthi =

1971 film

- Poster
- Directed by: K. S. Gopalakrishnan
- Written by: K. S. Gopalakrishnan
- Starring: Gemini Ganesan; Jayalalithaa
- Cinematography: K. S. Prashath
- Edited by: R. Devarajan
- Music by: K. V. Mahadevan
- Production company: Chitra Productions
- Release date: 17 October 1971
- Running time: 168 minutes
- Country: India
- Language: Tamil

Aathi Parasakthi (transl. Primordial power) is a 1971 Indian Tamil-language Hindu mythological film written and directed by K. S. Gopalakrishnan. It stars S. Varalakshmi in the title role, Gemini Ganesan and Jayalalithaa. Sridevi acted as a child artist, while Padmini made a cameo appearance. The film was released on 17 October 1971. It was dubbed in Hindi as Jai Jagat Janani (1976).

== Plot ==
The film tells the tales of the Primordial Hinduism Goddess Adi Parashakti in anthological format. The tales include:

- Abhirami Bhattar being rescued by Goddess Abhirami from his predicament by using her earring as a full moon on a new moon day. He goes on to narrate the rest of the tales to the king, Serfoji.
- Mariamman first cursing the British general Petersburg with leprosy when he mocks and goes on to violate the rules of temple only to give it back to him when he repents thereby turning him to a devotee. She also gives him darshans of her various avatars eg. Meenakshi, Kamakshi, Punnainallur Mariamman, and Vishalakshi. When his wife refuses to believe him, The Goddess rescues him in the form of a little girl when his house is about to demolished in a natural calamity.
- Mariamman giving her darshan to a devout fisherman who, following the advice of a great ascetic, goes on to attempt to drown himself if he doesn't get to see her in person. The ascetic himself though fails to follow his advice of wanting to see her as one is desperate for oxygen and fails to see her.
- Mahishasura illegally dominates and takes over not only the earth, but also the heavens. They all worship together and get Adi Parashakti to appear and save them, Parashakti responds by appearing as Durga and killing Mahishasura.
- Vishnu and Shiva fighting with their consorts, forcing them to leave their spouses. They lose their power, which is taken advantage of by Sumbha and Nisumbha, evil demons. They beg for Adi Parashakti's forgiveness, who in the form of spouses, were the source of their power. She takes the form of a dancer who makes the asuras kill each other, which was their boon as in they cannot be killed by anyone else, and rescues the universe.
- Parvati, through her son Kartikeya, gives the power of speech to an mute child turning him to a great poet to fulfil the desire of a desolate king who repents that there is no epoch defining poet in his kingdom which he sees as a personal failure.
- The epic love saga of Sati and Shiva, telling about her father Daksha's hatred for Shiva and Sati's true love for him, which eventually culminates in Shiva and Sati's marriage, both thanking the Goddess Adi Parashakti.

== Cast ==
- Gemini Ganesan as Shiva
- Jayalalithaa as Shakti, Dakshayani, Parvati, Meenakshi
- Padmini as Meenakshi, Vishalakshi, Kamakshi, KaruMariamman,
- R. Muthuraman
- S. V. Ranga Rao as Daksha
- Vanisri as Kaushiki
- M. N. Nambiar as Ashtavadhana Kaala Kandathana Munivar
- Rajasree as Lakshmi
- Venniradai Nirmala as Gunavathi, Shumbha's daughter
- G. Sakunthala
- Sridevi as Kartikeya
- Magic Radhika as fisherman's wife
- S. Varalakshmi as Adi Parashakti, Durga,
- V. Gopalakrishnan
- Major Sundarrajan as the foreigner
- Ragini as the foreigner's wife
- Suruli Rajan as Sengaathi, the fisherman
- S. V. Subbaiah as Abhirami Pattar
- S. V. Sahasranamam
- A. Karunanidhi as Nisumbha
- O. A. K. Thevar as Sumbha
- E. R. Sahadevan
- Baby Rani

== Soundtrack ==
The music was composed by K. V. Mahadevan. The song "Naan Aatchi" is set in Anandabhairavi raga. "Solladi Abirami" is set in Mayamalavagowla raga.

Songs	Singers	Lyrics	Length
"Aayi Mahamayi"	P. Susheela	Kannadasan	03:27
"Solladi Abirami"	T. M. Soundararajan	Kannadasan	04:23
"Naan Atchi Seithuvarum"	P. Susheela	Kannadasan	02:57
"Azhagaga Kannukku"	S. Janaki	Kannadasan	04:27
"Varugavae Varugavae"	P. Susheela	Kannadasan	04:58
"Aathadi Mariyamma"	Sirkazhi Govindarajan	Kannadasan	03:51
"Om Aathi Parasakthi"	T. M. Soundararajan	Udumalai Narayana Kavi	03:47
"Thanthaikku Manthirathai"	Radha Jayalakshmi	Kannadasan	03:21
"Kokku Parakum"	Radha Jayalakshmi	Kannadasan	03:20
"Jaya Jaya Devi Bhavani" (Bit Version)	Chorus		
"Thillana"	Soolamangalam Rajalakshmi		

== Release ==
The film was successful at the box office and made more than other films that were released at the same time namely Babu, Neerum Neruppum, and Veettukku Oru Pillai.
