= Kalakala =

Kalakala may refer to:

- Kalantaka or Kalakala, aspect of the Hindu god Shiva as destroyer of Death
- MV Kalakala, a US car ferry
