= Nethakani =

Indian caste

The Nethakani or Netkani (also Nethkani in Maharashtra or Nethakaani in Telangana) are a Marathi- and Telugu-speaking caste of cotton weavers and laborers. Originating in Maharashtra, and spread over middle India, Northern and southern parts of India. Traditionally they have been associated with the occupation of weaving (netha neyuta means "weaving" in Telugu), but they have now largely moved to cultivation and agricultural labor; with a few of them being small land-owners.

== History ==
The Nethkani claim descent from Brigu Maharshi, Markandeya, and Bhawana rishi. According to Bhadravathi Kalyana Natakamu, a folk-drama which has been published, the Nethakani are one among the four sections of Padmasaliyulu who are the sons of Bhavana Rushi. The four sections mentioned in this drama are Padmiyulu, Padmasakhiyulu, Padmasalikulu and Padmapulindulu. Padma-pulindulu was the original name of the Nethakani. From Padmapulindulu, the name became Chenethakanivaru, which in course of time changed to the present form, Nethakani.

During British rule, Hyderabad State was ruled by the Nizam Nawabs with Aurangabad as the capital of Maharashtra. The Nethakanis migrated to other parts of the country due to financial difficulties, some of which also came to the Telangana region. They later started farming as agricultural laborers in the Telangana region so that their economic condition improved to some extent.

The main occupation of the Nethakani society in the past was weaving handloom textiles. Weaving has disappeared over time, forcing the Nethakani to turn toward other professions, mainly agricultural labour and the making of agricultural implements (e.g. plowing edlabandi, making). Nethakani also went into the forest to gather coir and make rope from it, including line ropes, line ropes for bullock carts, reins for oxen, goats, tails, etc. The threads made of coir are called nulaka and the beds were woven with this nulaka. Linen beds are also known as chenetha beds.

== Present distribution and conditions ==
Based on their financial status in the society, Nethekanis are designated as a Scheduled Caste (SC) in Andhra Pradesh, Karnataka, Maharashtra, and Telangana, and may be classified as an Other Backward Class (OBC) in other parts of India.

=== Maharashtra ===
Nethakanis are distributed throughout Maharashtra. Most live in Chandrapur and Gadchiroli areas of Maharashtra, with smaller populations in other areas. The Nethakanis of Maharashtra speak Marathi, as do those in the neighbouring Adilabad district of Telangana.

=== Telangana ===
In Telangana, Nethakanis are found primarily in the Godavari River basin, in the districts of Adilabad, Karimnagar, Nizamabad, Khammam, and Warangal. Nethakani's are among the smaller SC castes in Telangana; a study estimated their population to be around 80,000, constituting about 1% of the state's total SC population.

Nethakani in Adilabad Warangal Agency areas in Khammam district such as Utnur, Asifabad, Aturunagaram Bhadrachalam are living with tribals in areas under ITDA. But the Nethakani caste people who have been residing in the agency areas for many generations have no right to land, no education, no job, no political opportunities. In a way the orphans living in the Agency area are said to be the poorest of the tribals in India, but the local Nethakani people experience worse poverty than those tribes.

== Culture ==
This people are part of Hindu Shiva sampradaya. They are unique caste present in India. They speak Marathi, Telugu, Kannada, Gujarati, and Hindi.

The Nethakanis are distinguished by their custom of tying their head cloth in a roughly square shape, and by their loincloths, which are worn very loose and not knotted.

After the independence of India, the state of Hyderabad was merged into the state of Andhra Pradesh pursuant to the States Reorganisation Act, 1956. Due to this boundary change, the non-weaver community on one side of the Godavari river basin would come under the state of Maharashtra, and the weaver community on the other side came under the joint state of Andhra Pradesh. Among the Netakani in Telangana's Adilabad district, Buddhist religious traditions are practiced. In the villages in the Aheri Revenue Division area, the non-weaving community follows the religion of the Buddha, as well as the ideology of Ambedkar, and some Hindu traditions. The Telugu language is mostly spoken by the Netakani community living in these areas.
