= Abirami Antati =

Tamil collection of poems

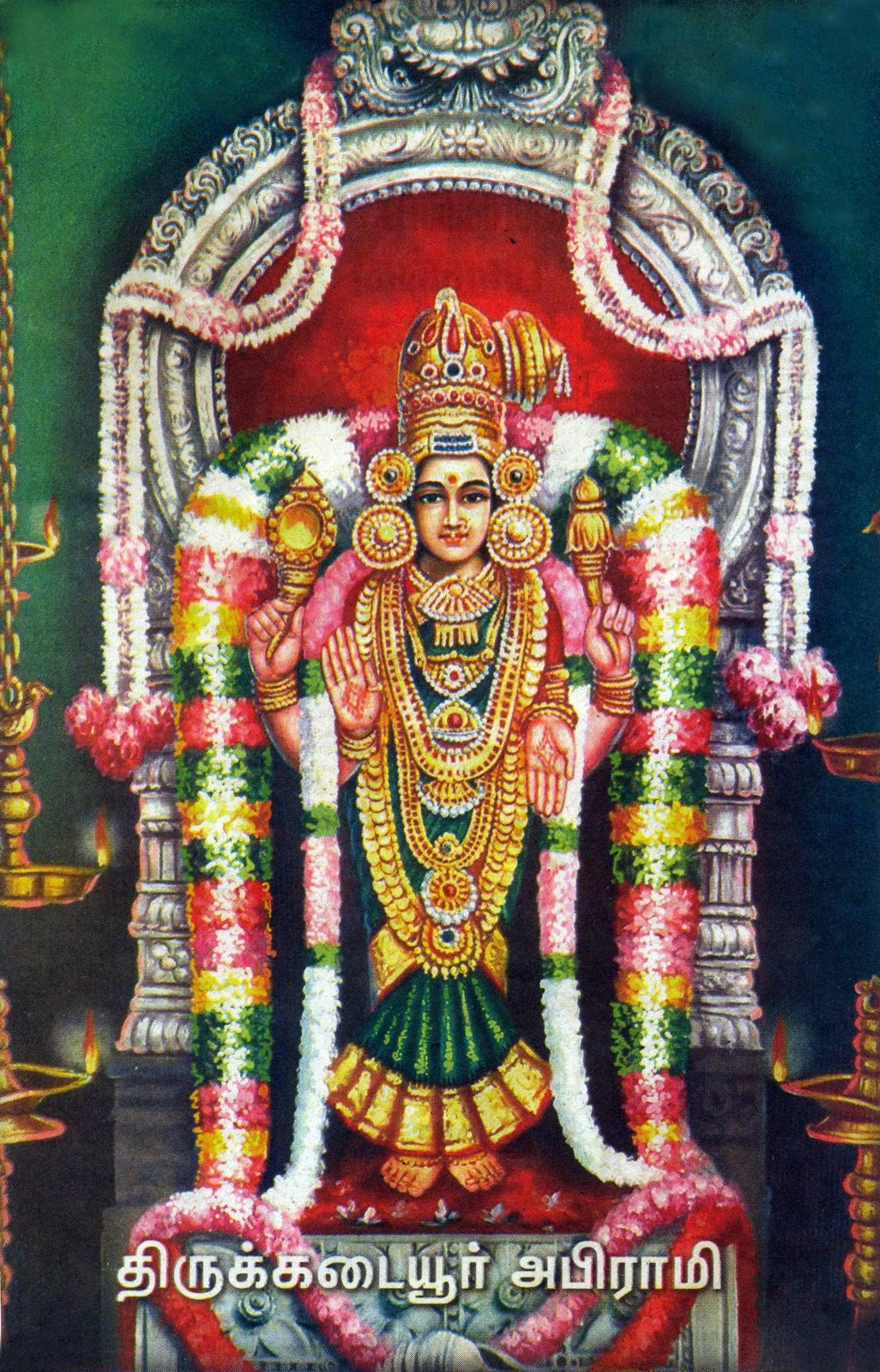
Abirami Antati was composed in praise of the goddess Parvati, whose name is Abirami at Thirukkadavur Sivan Temple.

Abirami Antati (Tamil: அபிராமி அந்தாதி, romanized: Apirāmi Antāti) is a Tamil collection of poems sung on goddess Abirami, a deity venerated in Thirukkadaiyur Amirtaghatesvarar Sivan Temple, situated in Tamil Nadu, India. This poetry was composed by Abirami Bhattar (His birth name was Subramanyam Iyer) who lived during the 18th century CE, a contemporary to Serfoji I of Tanjore.

== Etymology ==
Antati (Tamil: அந்தாதி, Antāti) is a classification of Tamil poetry in which last word of a previous verse comes as the first word of next verse. Thus this kind of poem gots its name, Antam (அந்தம், the end) + āti (ஆதி, the beginning) = Antāti. Since this antati was sung in praise of the goddess Abirami of Thirukkadavur, Tamil Nadu, it is known as Abirami Antati. Although Tamil literature consists of hundreds of Antati songs, Abirami Antati is praised as one of the prominent Antati songs of Tamil literature.

== Legend ==
It is said that the author of this song, Abirami Bhattar, was an ardent devotee of goddess Shakti. Once, when the king Serfoji I visited the Thirukkadavur temple on the day of the new moon and asked him what day it is, he said that it was a full moon day - because he was at that moment observing the religious rite known as the Tithi Nitya Aradhana in the Sri Chakra Navavarana krama and was worshipping the goddess as Pournami Tithi. The king was not aware of this rite, provoking his fury and causing him to sentence Bhattar to death. Legend says that the author sung this antati until the goddess appeared in front of him and threw her earring towards the sky, which lit the sky bright like the full moon. Tamil Shaktas believe that recitation of Abirami Antati on the full moon and new moon days would result in impossible boons.

== Stanzas ==
There are a hundred stanzas plus a காப்பு (Kāppu, protection) verse for Ganesha and a final பயன் (Payaṉ, outcome), thus a total of 102 stanzas that are included in Abirami Antati. The author praises Abirami as his own mother, regrets his mistakes, speaks of the divine play of his mother and his father, Shiva, and her simplicity and mercy. It is believed that recitation of each stanza results in the specific achievement of the devotees. Here is one of the famous stanzas of the Abirami Antati:

" மணியே, மணியின் ஒளியே, ஒளிரும் அணி புனைந்த

அணியே, அணியும் அணிக்கு அழகே, அணுகாதவர்க்குப்
பிணியே, பிணிக்கு மருந்தே, அமரர் பெரு விருந்தே.

பணியேன், ஒருவரை நின் பத்ம பாதம் பணிந்தபின்னே." - செய்யுள் 24

" Maṇiyē, maṇiyiṉ oḷiyē, oḷirum aṇi puṉainta

aṇiyē, aṇiyum aṇikku aḻakē, aṇukātavarkkup
piṇiyē, piṇikku maruntē, amarar peru viruntē.-

Paṇiyēṉ, oruvarai niṉ patma pātam paṇintapiṉṉē." - stanza 24

Pearl like you are, You who are the reddish aura of the pearl!
You are like the pearl studded chain who adds beauty to the chain,
You are pain to those who do not fall at your feet while the panacea for pains of those who fall at your feet, the nectar of Gods,
After worshipping at thine lotus feet, Will I bow before any other, Now and now after.
