= Tirumayanam Brahmapureeswarar Temple =

Temple in Tirumayanam, India

Coordinates: 11.0200°N 78.4600°E

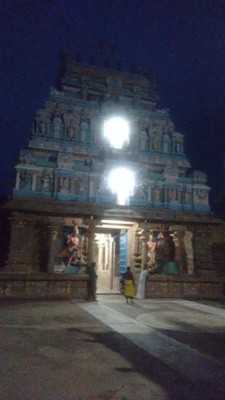
Gopura of the temple

Tirumayanam Brahmapureeswarar Temple( திருமயானம் பிரம்மபுரீஸ்வரர் கோயில்])is a Hindu temple located at Tirumayanam in Mayiladuthurai district of Tamil Nadu, India. The presiding deity is Shiva. He is called as Brahmmapureeswarar. His consort is known as Malarkuzhal Minnammai.

Another Padal Petra Shiva sthalam, Amritaghateswarar Abirami Temple, Thirukkadaiyur is located about a kilometer far, westerly.

== Location ==
This temple is right behind the Amirthaghateswarar temple in the easterly direction, about 3 km away.

== Significance ==
It is one of the shrines of the 275 Paadal Petra Sthalams - Shiva Sthalams glorified in the early medieval Tevaram poems by Tamil Saivite Nayanars Tirugnanasambandar, Tirunavukkarasar and Sundarar.

Mayana Kshetras are the places where Lord Brahma was reduced to ashes by Lord Shiva. Five such places are - Kasi (Varanasi) Mayanam, Kacchi (Kanchipuram) Mayanam; Kazhi (Sirkazhi) Mayanam, Nallur (Thirunallur) Mayanam and Kadavur (Thirukadaiyur) Mayanam.

== Mythology ==
At the end of every eon Lord Shiva burns the god Brahma (Who is the god of Creation) to ashes. This event happened in Thirukadayur Thirumayanam too. The devas (Celestial beings) rushed to god Shiva and pleaded with Him to give life to Brahma again lest the act of creation will stop. Shiva relented and gave Brahma his life back.

== Temple inscriptions ==
The temple inscriptions refer to the presiding deity as "Jayamkonda Cholavalanattu Akkurnaatu Brahmadeyam Thirukadavoorudayar Thirumayanamudaya Perumal" a long name typical of that era. Only the later Vijayanagar period inscriptions mention Him as Brahmapureeswarar. His consort is referred to as Malarkuzhal Minnammai. There are several inscriptions about the various grants given to the temple for the daily maintenance and practice of daily rituals. There is a mention of a temple grant to support daily rendition of Vedas using the instrument Veena, daily redition of Srirudarm and daily practice of Vedas. Lands have been granted in two villages called "Thiruthonda Thogai Mangalam" and "Sivapada Sekara Mangalam" for the above purposes.

There is a bronze idol of Singaravelar with Valli and Devasena in the main sanctum. The temple outer niches contain Chola era idols of Thirumal, Bhikshadanar, Durga, Lingodhbhava, Gangadhara, and Ganapathy. These idols are great works of art of a bygone era.

Near the Dhakshinamurthy idol there is a statue of a Chola king with folded hand worshipping the deity. The king is clad is simple clothes, with long beard and mustache. This could be the statue of Kulothunga-III, based on the inscriptions and similar statues of the same king in other temples.

== Trivia ==
There is well at the southern end of the temple called Aswathi Kinaru. Its water is taken to the Amirthaghateswarar temple for ablution of the main deity.

The belief is that those who cannot afford to travel to Kasi to bathe in holy Ganges can bathe in this water and still get the same benefits. This can be done on Panguni month (March–April), Ashwini nakshathiram day

== Literary mention ==
Tirugnanasambandar describes the feature of the deity as:

தூயவிடைமேல் வருவார துன்னாருடைய மதில்கள்

காயவேவச் செற்றார் கடவூர்மயான மமர்ந்தார்
தீயகருமஞ் சொல்லுஞ் சிறு புன்றேர ரமணர்

பேய்பேயென்ன வருவார் அவரெம்பெருமா னடிகளே.
