= Amritaghateswarar-Abirami Temple =

Shiva temple in Tamil Nadu, India

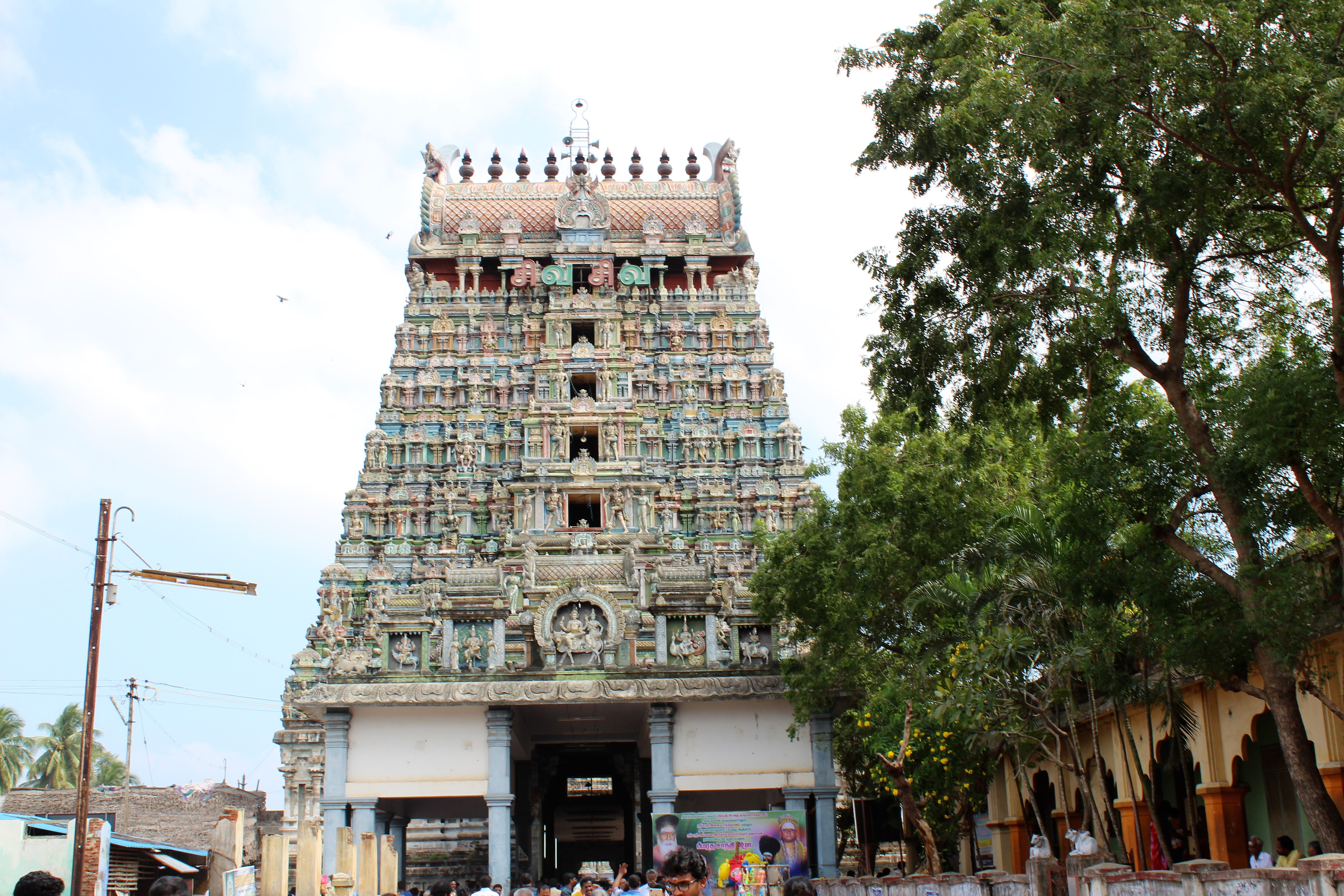

- Location in Tamil Nadu

Religion
- Affiliation: Hinduism
- District: Mayiladuthurai district
- Deity: Amirthagateswarar(Shiva), Abhirami (Parvati)

Location
- Location: Thirukkadaiyur, Mayiladuthurai
- State: Tamil Nadu
- Country: India
- Coordinates: 11°4′39″N 79°49′6″E

Architecture
- Type: Tamil architecture
- Creator: Cholas

Amrithakadeeswarar Abhirami Temple (also called Abhirami temple is a Hindu temple to Shiva in his manifestation as Kalantaka and his wife Parvati as Abhirami. There is a shrine for Maha Vishnu as Amrithanarayana and his consort Mahalakshmi as Amrithavalli. It is in Thirukkadaiyur (Thirukkadavur), Tamil Nadu in India. This temple is associated with the legend of Shiva saving his young devotee, Markendeya from death, and the tale of a saint, Abirami Pattar a devotee of the presiding goddess.

The presiding deity is mentioned in the 7th-century-CE Tamil Saiva canonical work, the Tevaram. The temple complex covers 10 acres and has two gateway towers known as gopurams. The tallest is the eastern tower, with 11 stories and a height of 46 metres (151 ft). The temple has numerous shrines, with those of Amirthaghateswarar and Abhirami being the most prominent. The masonry structure was built during the Chola dynasty in the 9th century, while later expansions are attributed to Thanjavur Nayaks. The temple is maintained and administered by the Dharmapuram Aadhenam.

As per Hindu legend, Shiva is believed to have destroyed eight different demons and the eight Ashta Veeratanam temples are built signifying each of his victories. The temple is counted one of the eight where Shiva is believed to have appeared as Kalasamharamurthy to save Markandeya from the death clutches of Yama. Based on the legend of Markandeya, it is believed that worshiping at this temple will give longevity to couples who have reached age sixty or eighty-one and such worship is common in the temple.

== History ==
There are several inscriptions in the temple belonging to the Medieval Cholas. On the southern wall in the central shrine, there is an inscription from the 13th regnal year of Rajaraja I indicating stipulation of paddy to the temple by a merchant in return to offer of land to the temple offered. Another record in the temple indicates the record (ARE 242 of 1925) of a gift of paddy to the temple by Rajendra Chola for conducting eight-day temple festival annually. A third record on the same wall indicates record dated to 1054 CE from the reign of Rajadhiraja Chola records a gift of land by a devotee to feed 17 devotees. The fourth record (ARE 244 of 1925) in the shrine from the period of Kulothunga Chola I indicates the Mahasabha of Tirukadavur selling 1.74 velis of land that had been lying fallow for 50 years. An interesting inscription from the outer precinct from the period of Rajaraja II indicates confiscation of lands from a custodian of a temple who colluded with Vaishanvites (worshipers of Vishnu). There are several inscriptions indicating donations for performing art, drama, dance and music. The temple is maintained and administered by the Dharmapuram Adheenam.

== Architecture ==
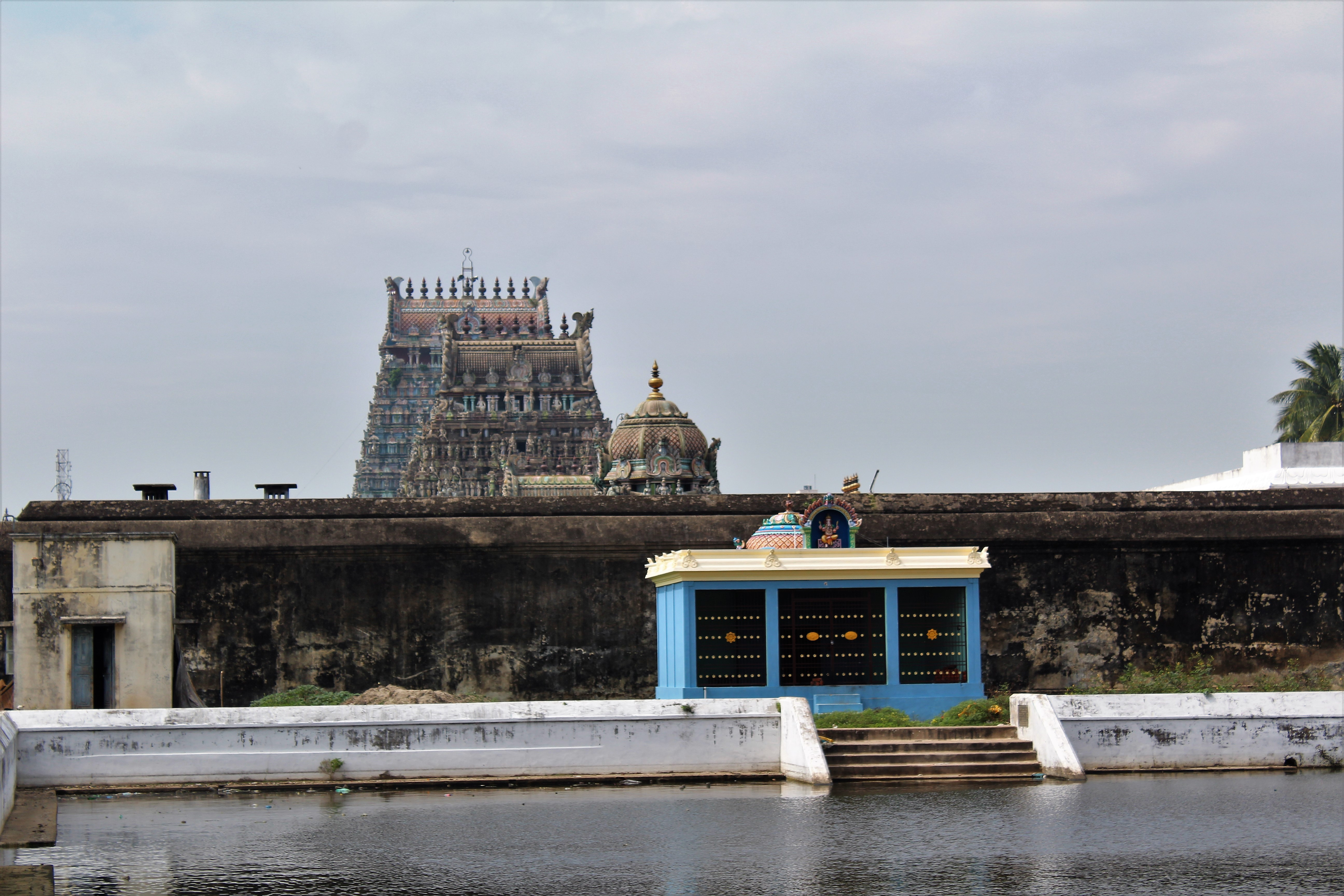
Temple tank behind the temple

The temple occupies an area of 11 acres (4.5 ha) and has around five large precincts. The temple faces West and is approached through a seven-tiered raja gopuram (pyramidal temple tower). The central shrine houses the image of Amrithakadeswarar in the form of Linga. There is a separate shrine for Kalasamharamurthy, the saviour of Markendeya near the sanctum. The bronze image is sported with four arms, emanating out of a Linga. The niches in the walls around the first precinct contains images of Durga, Dakshinamurthy and Chandikesa. There are five set of stone sculptures belonging to the Chola temple. There are three temple tanks, or teerthams, known as Amrita Pushkarini, Kaala Theertham and Maarkandeya Theertham. There is a separate shrine dedicated to Abhirami. The Shakta saint Abhirami Pattar is believed to have rendered the Abhirami Anthathi in the front hall of the shrine. The temple also maintains a separate shrine for Markandeya worshipping Kalasamhara Murti. Although Thirukadaiyur is a Shaiva temple, it contains an old Vaishnava temple. The gods in this temple are Amrita Narayana (Vishnu) and his consort Amrita Valli (Lakshmi). The shrine of Abirami faces east and is located close to the entrance tower. The precinct houses the image of Abirami Pattar.

== Religious importance ==
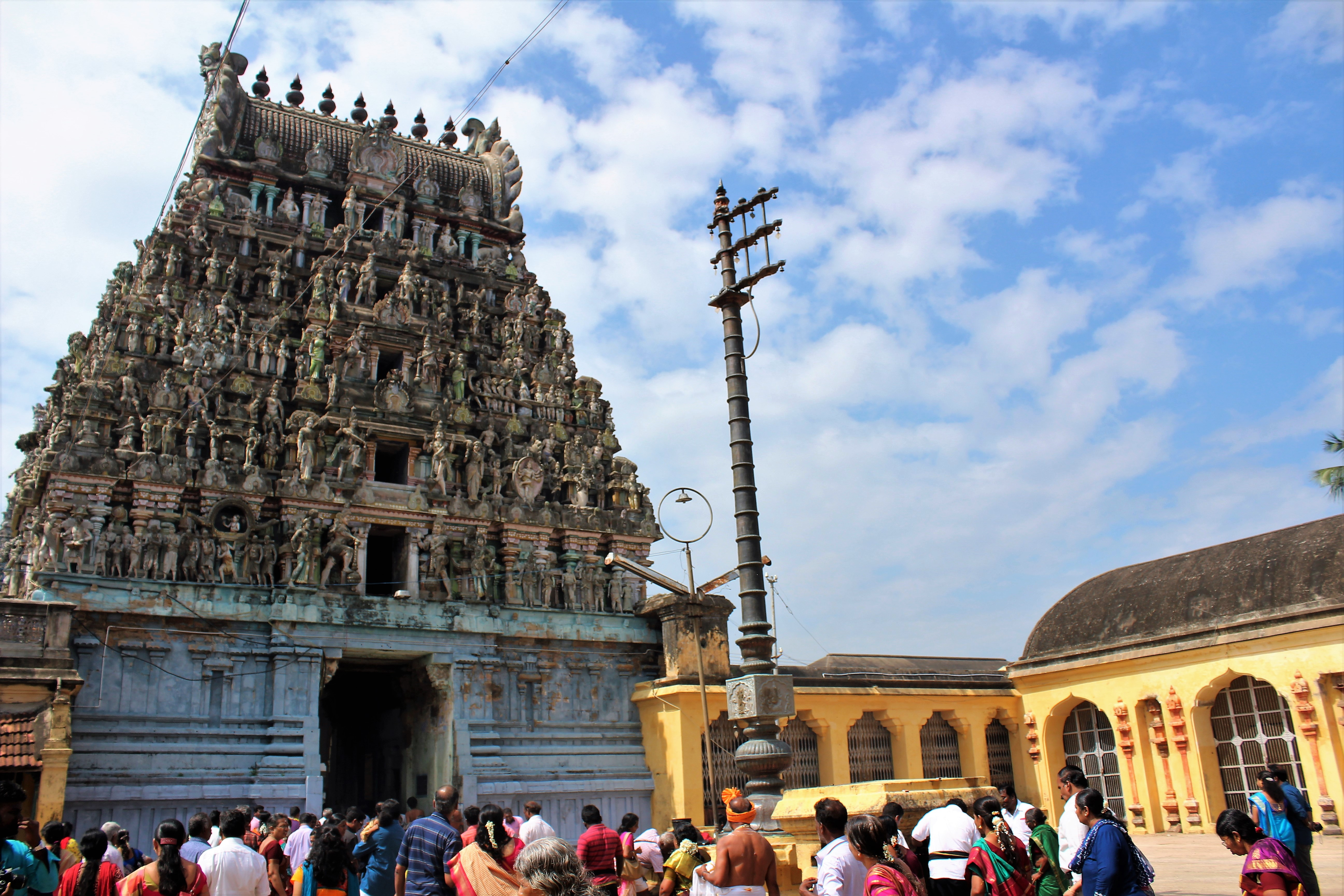
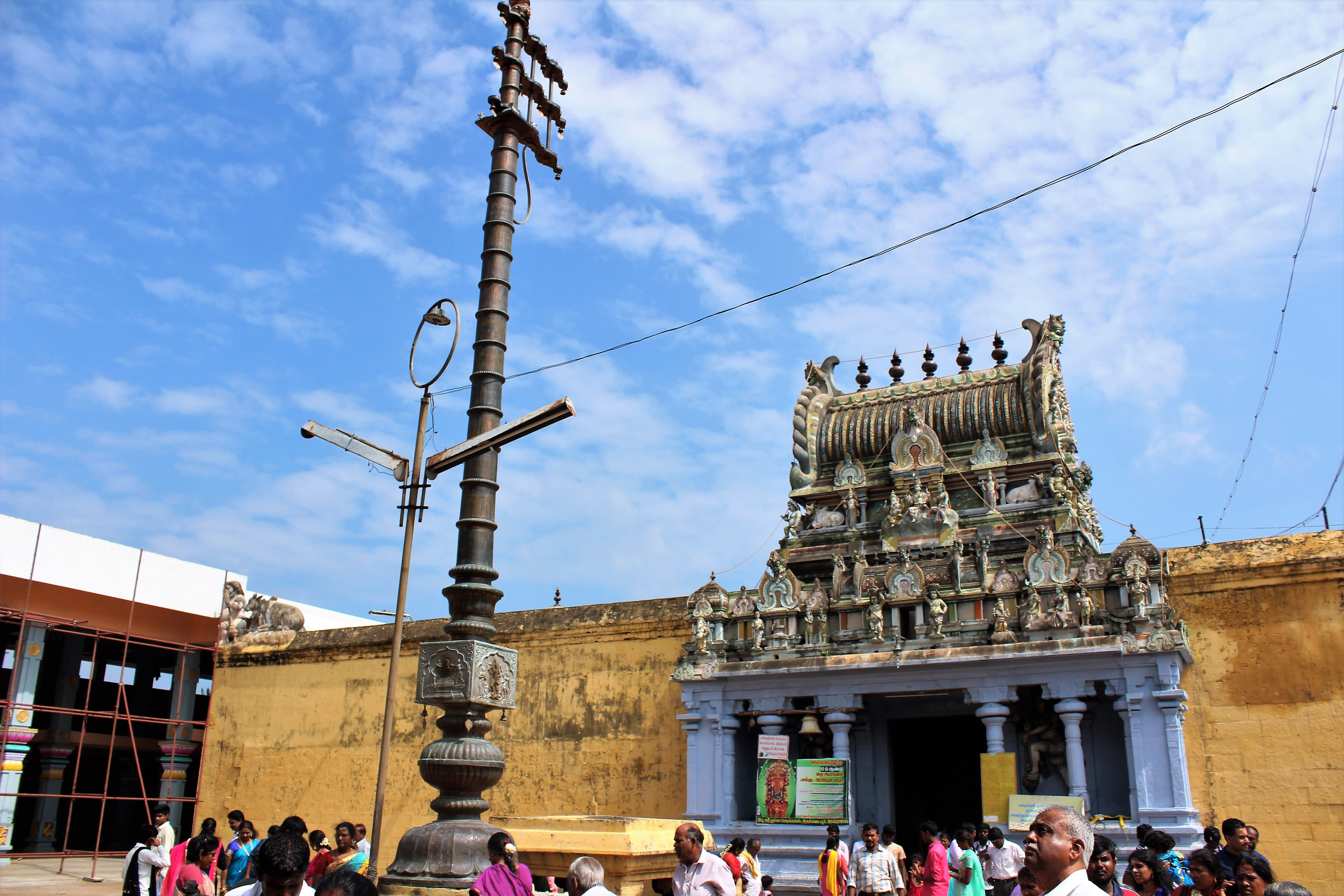
Shrines of the temple

Among the sixty-three Shaiva poet-saints, collectively known as the Nayanars, Kungiliya Kalaya Nayanar and Kari Nayanar both worshiped and attained liberation from the cycle of birth and death here. Kalaya Nayanar was an ardent worshiper of Shiva and lighted temple lamps & incense sticks with his meager earning. Once he had no earning and the family was facing severe poverty. Kalaya's wife gave his gold ornament to sell for daily expenditure. Kalaya sold the gold and used the money for lighting the temple lamps. As he lighted more and more lamps, his house was filled with grains. A divine voice detailed his affinity towards the presiding deity resulted in the wealth. He came to be known as Kungili Kalayanar (kungilium in Tamil means incense powder).

The Nayanars Appar, Sundarar and Tirugnana Sambandar have also sung of the glories of this shrine. All Siddhas visited this temple. Specially Siddhar Korakkar visited this temple and got the blessings of the goddess. The eleven songs of Sambandar are compiled in third Thirumurai as 8th canto. The thirty one songs of Appar are compiled in the fourth Thirumrai ten each under 31st and 107th canto, while the remaining eleven in fifth Thirumrai under 11th canto. The ten songs of Sundarar are compiled in seventh Thirumurai in 28th cantor.

It is one of the Ashta Veeratanam temples that commemorate Shiva's eight acts of valour and fury where he is said to have been victorious over demons, heroes or divinities.
