= Mrikanda =

Father of Markandeya in Hinduism

- Texts: Puranas

Genealogy
- Parents: Vidhatri (father), Niyati (mother)
- Spouse: Manasvini
- Children: Markandeya

Mrikanda (Sanskrit: मृकण्ड, romanized: Mṛkaṇḍa) is a sage in Hindu mythology. He is the husband of Manasvini and the father of Markandeya.

== Legend ==
In the Vishnu Purana, Mrikanda is described as the son of Vidhatri, a son of Bhrigu and Khyati, and Niyati, one of the two daughters of Meru. Mrikanda becomes the father of the sage Markandeya. The Markandeya Purana names Manasvini as Mrikanda's wife.

Mrikanda is venerated as the founder of weaving, and as a result of the gods' gratitude he was granted two boons--a tiger and a giant. The giant disobeyed Mrikandaʻs orders and was summarily slain, but the tiger was obedient, and thus lived. According to modern Koshta folklore, if a tiger is encountered in the jungle it is enough only to speak Mrikanda's name to prevent oneself from being attacked by it. Mrikanda is still seen as a watchful and protective figure in folklore.

In addition to being the father of modern weaving, he is also venerated as the father of Markandeya, the rishi (sage) who is featured extensively in the Markandeya Purana. According to legend, Mrikanda and his wife Marudmati worshipped Shiva and sought from him the boon of begetting a son. As a result, he was given the choice of either a righteous son, but with a short life on earth or a child of low intelligence but with a long life. Mrikanda chose the former, and was blessed with Markandeya, an exemplary son, who was nevertheless destined to die at the age of 16.
