= Yamantaka =

"Lord of death" deity in Vajrayana Buddhism

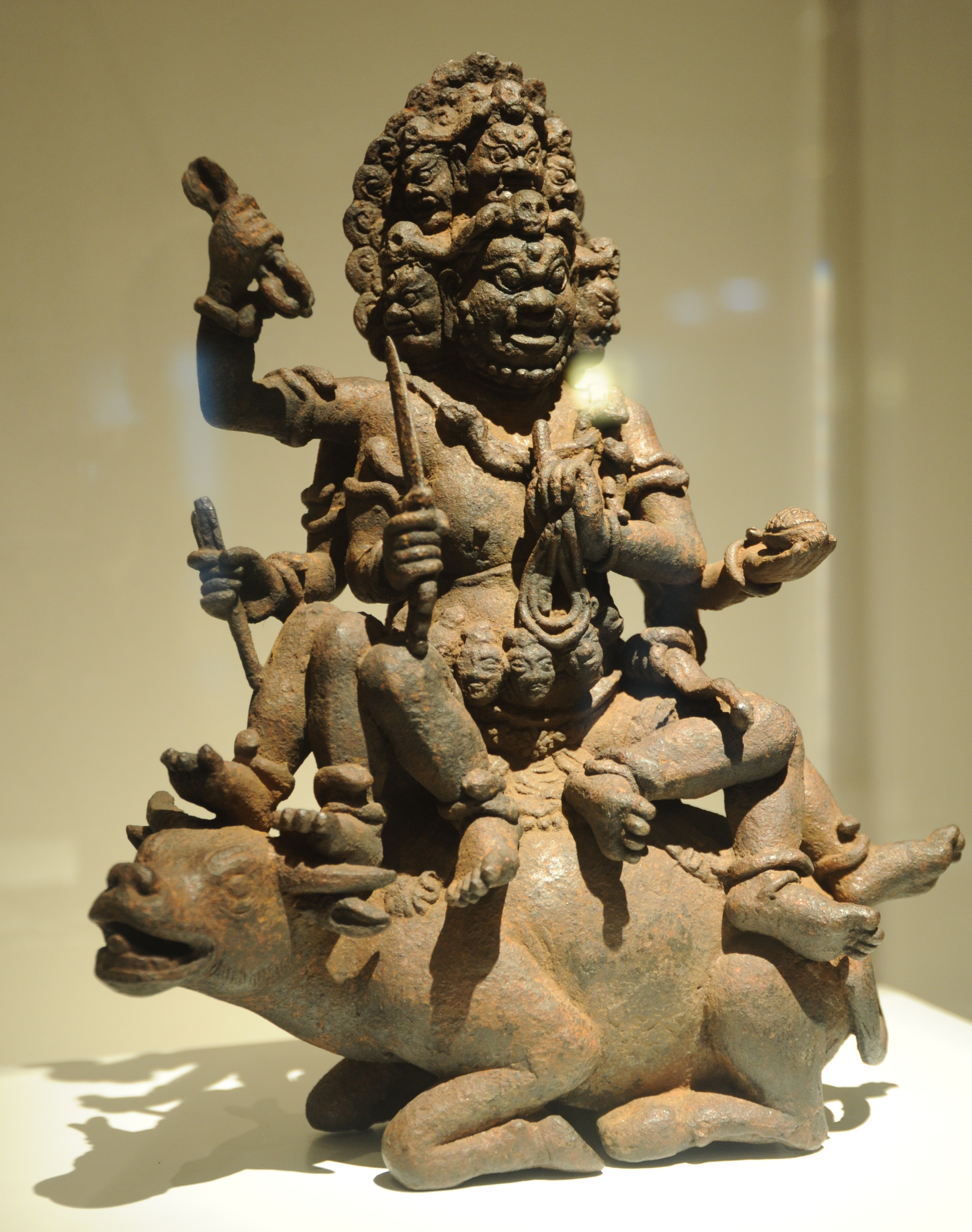
Yamantaka is the "destroyer of death" deity in Vajrayana Buddhism, above riding a water buffalo.

Yamāntaka (Note: Sanskrit: यमान्तक Yamāntaka) or Vajrabhairava (Note: Tibetan: གཤིན་རྗེ་གཤེད་, རྡོ་རྗེ་འཇིགས་བྱེད།, Wylie: gshin rje gshed; rdo rje 'jigs byed; simplified Chinese: 大威德金刚; traditional Chinese: 大威德金剛; pinyin: Dà Wēidé Jīngāng; Korean: 대위덕명왕 Daewideok-myeongwang; Japanese: 大威徳明王 Daiitoku-myōō; Mongolian: Эрлэгийн Жаргагчи Erlig-jin Jargagchi) is the "destroyer of death" deity of Vajrayana Buddhism. Sometimes he is conceptualized as "conqueror of the lord of death". Of the several deities in the Buddhist pantheon named Yamāntaka, the most well known belongs to the Anuttarayoga class of tantra of deities popular within the Gelug school of Tibetan Buddhism.

== Etymology ==
Yamāntaka is a Sanskrit name that can be broken down into two primary elements: Yama (यम), –the god of death; and antaka (अन्तक) –destroyer. Thus, Yamāntaka means “Destroyer of Death” or "Conqueror of Death".

While Yamāntaka is therefore Yama's nemesis, his representation mirrors Yama in many ways: he too often rides a buffalo and is often depicted with a buffalo's head.

Because of this mirroring of appearance and similarity in name, it is not hard to find texts and books (which would appear to be reliable sources of much material) conflate both Yamāntaka and Yama as being the same deity when they are not.

Within Buddhism, "terminating death" is a quality of all buddhas as they have stopped the cycle of rebirth, samsara. So Yamāntaka represents the goal of the Mahayana practitioner's journey to enlightenment, or the journey itself: On final awakening, one manifests Yamāntaka – the ending of death.

== Origin ==
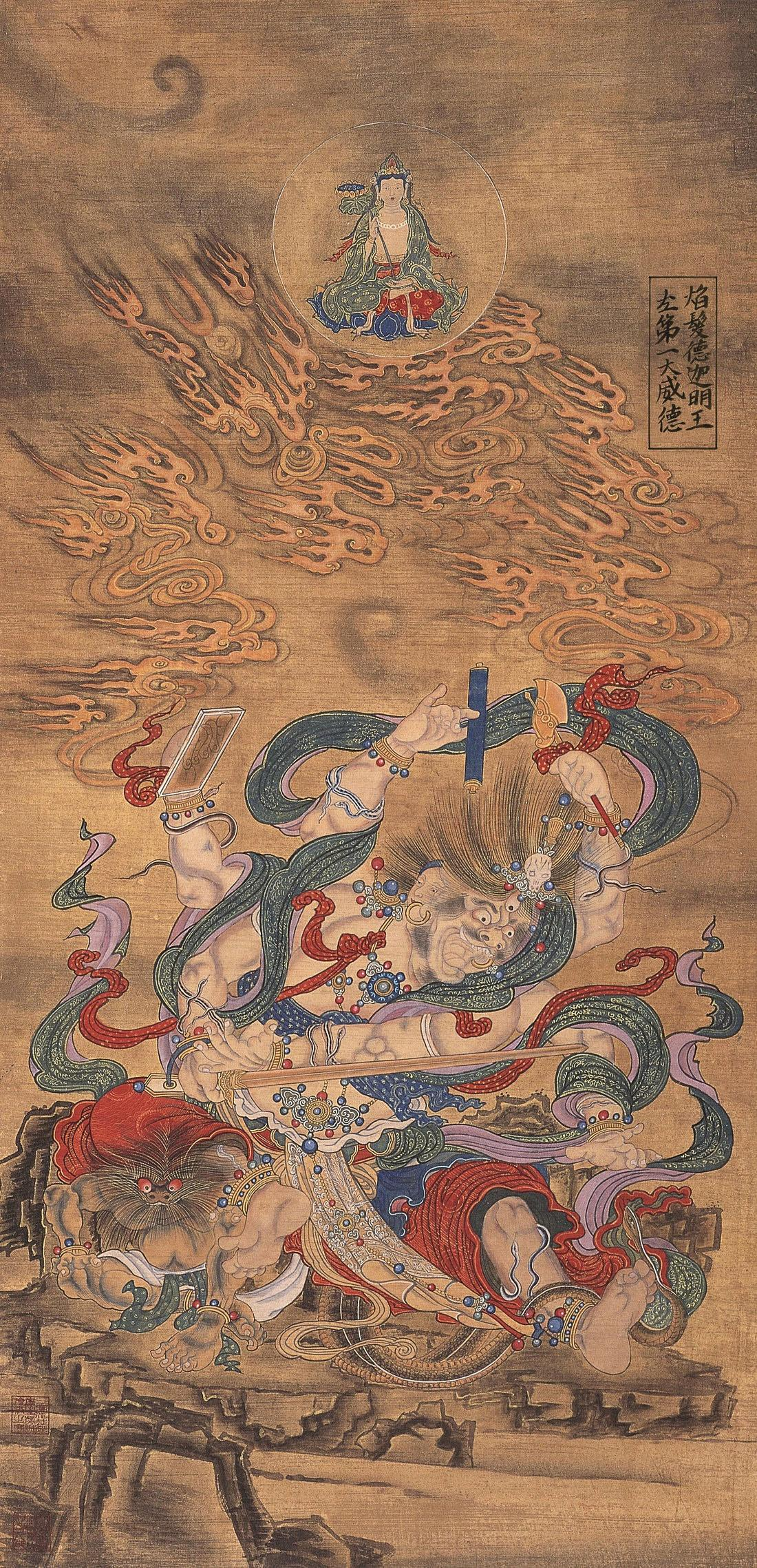
Ming dynasty (1368 - 1644) Shuilu ritual painting of Yamāntaka (Dàwēidé Míngwáng), one out of a set depicting the Ten Wisdom Kings, at Baoning Temple^{[zh]} in Shanxi, China.

One historic source of name follows Kalantaka, an aspect of the Hindu god Shiva who saves his follower from the clutches of death Yama and is seen as the deity of adherence and origin of the Mahamrityunjaya Mantra of Buddhism and Hinduism.

In the buddhist Tantra, Siva as wrathful Bhairava, prefixing of the term “vajra” to his name—the preeminent symbol of power in the Buddhist tantra vehicle (Vajrayana)—is interpreted as a definitive sign of Bhairava's wholesale transformation and conversion to Buddhism. The subjugation and conversion of non-Buddhist deities and the subsequent acquisition of the defeated deity's special attributes is a common theme in Buddhist tantric literature.

Taranatha describes Yamāntaka is a wrathful expression of Mañjuśrī, the bodhisattva of wisdom. However, the Mañjuśrīmūlakalpa describes Yamāntaka to be an emanation of Vajrapani. In Chinese Buddhism and Shingon Buddhism, Yamāntaka is the wrathful emanation of Amitabha. He adopted this form in order to defeat Yama, the lord of death who was arrogantly interfering with karma by claiming victims before their time was up. Yamāntaka submitted Yama by terrorizing him with his form, one even more frightening than that of Yama himself, which at the same time also acted as mirror of Yama's horrible appearance. Yama then repented his actions and became a guardian of dharma. Through this way, Mañjuśrī also exposed the illusory nature of the fear of death, as well as the unreality of death itself.

== Forms ==
Yamāntaka manifests in several different forms, one of which has six legs, six faces and six arms holding various weapons while sitting or standing on a water buffalo. The topmost face is the wrathful aspect of Mañjuśrī, with a red face below it. The other faces are yellow, dark blue, red, black, white, grey, and brown. Each face has three eyes.

The most common representation, Vajramahabhairava, depicts 9 heads, thirty-two hands and sixteen legs standing on Yama and all the Deva's, and Asuras. Also, like Yama, he is represented with an erect penis, symbolizing the alchemy of bodily fluids.

In Chinese Buddhism and Shingon Buddhism, Yamāntaka is pictured with six faces, legs and arms holding various weapons while sitting on a white ox.

== Gallery ==
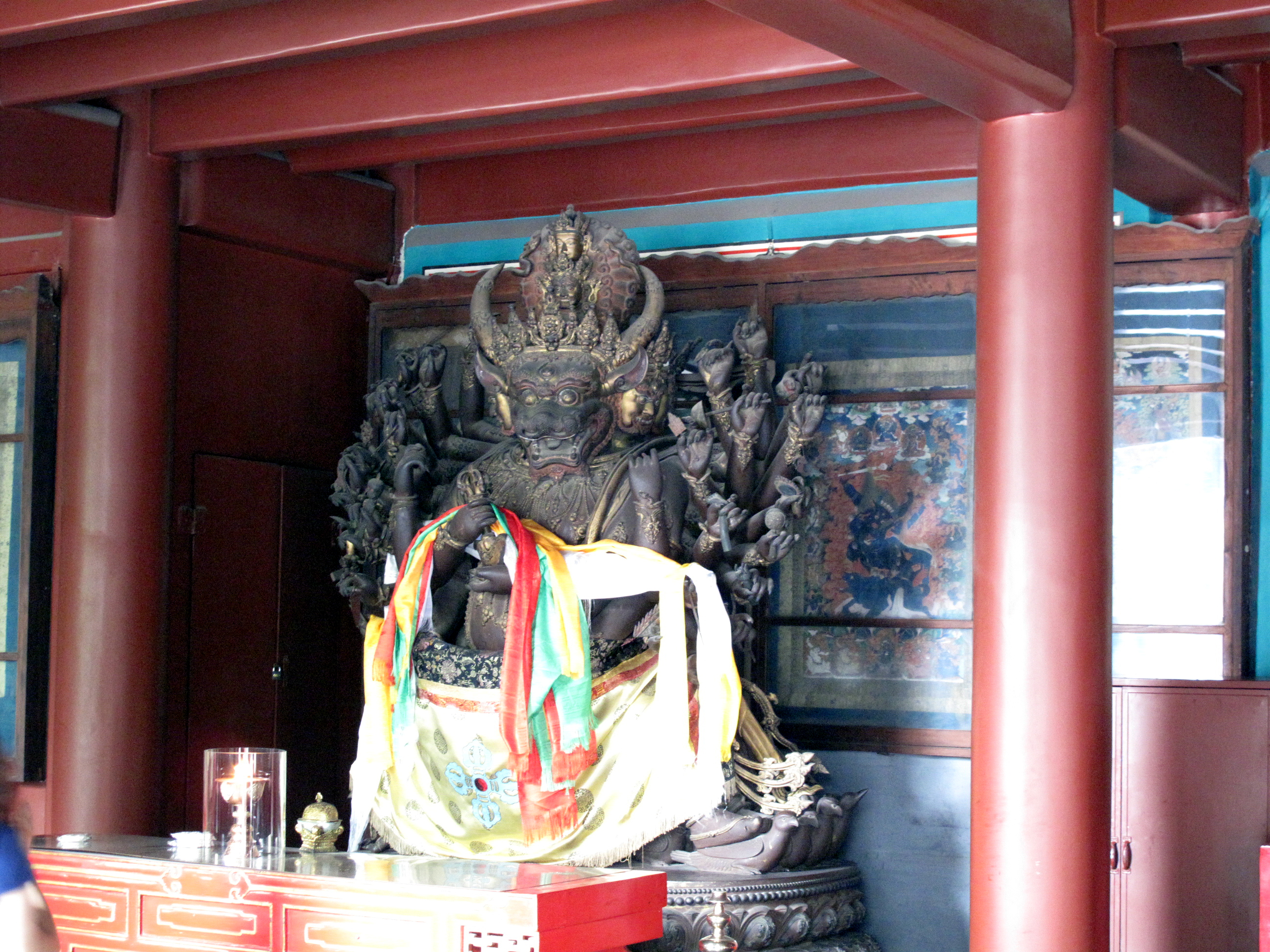
Yamāntaka in a Beijing Buddhist temple.

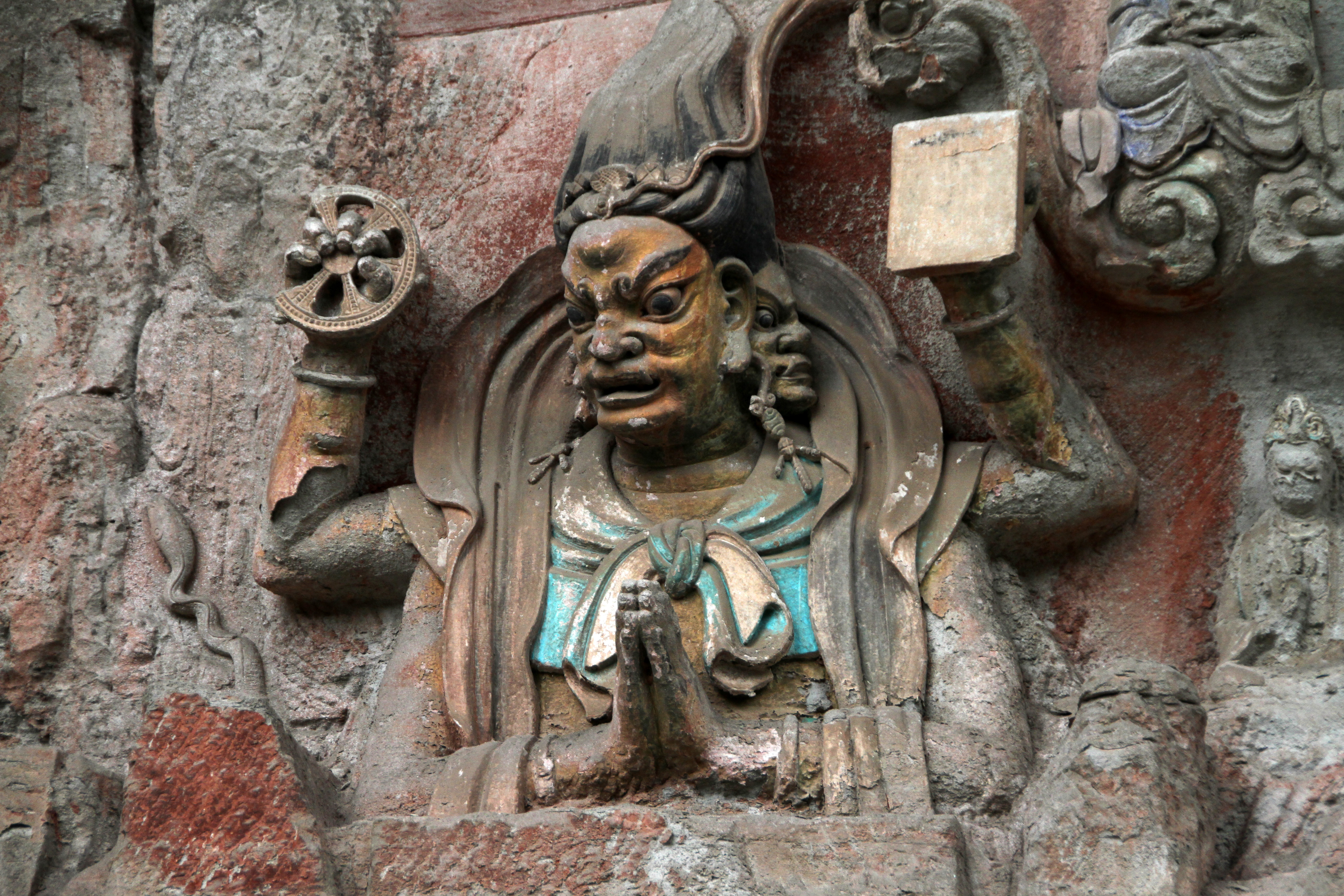
Carved cliff relief of Yamāntaka, one out of a set depicting the Ten Wisdom Kings, at the Dazu Rock Carvings in Chongqing, China. 7th century.

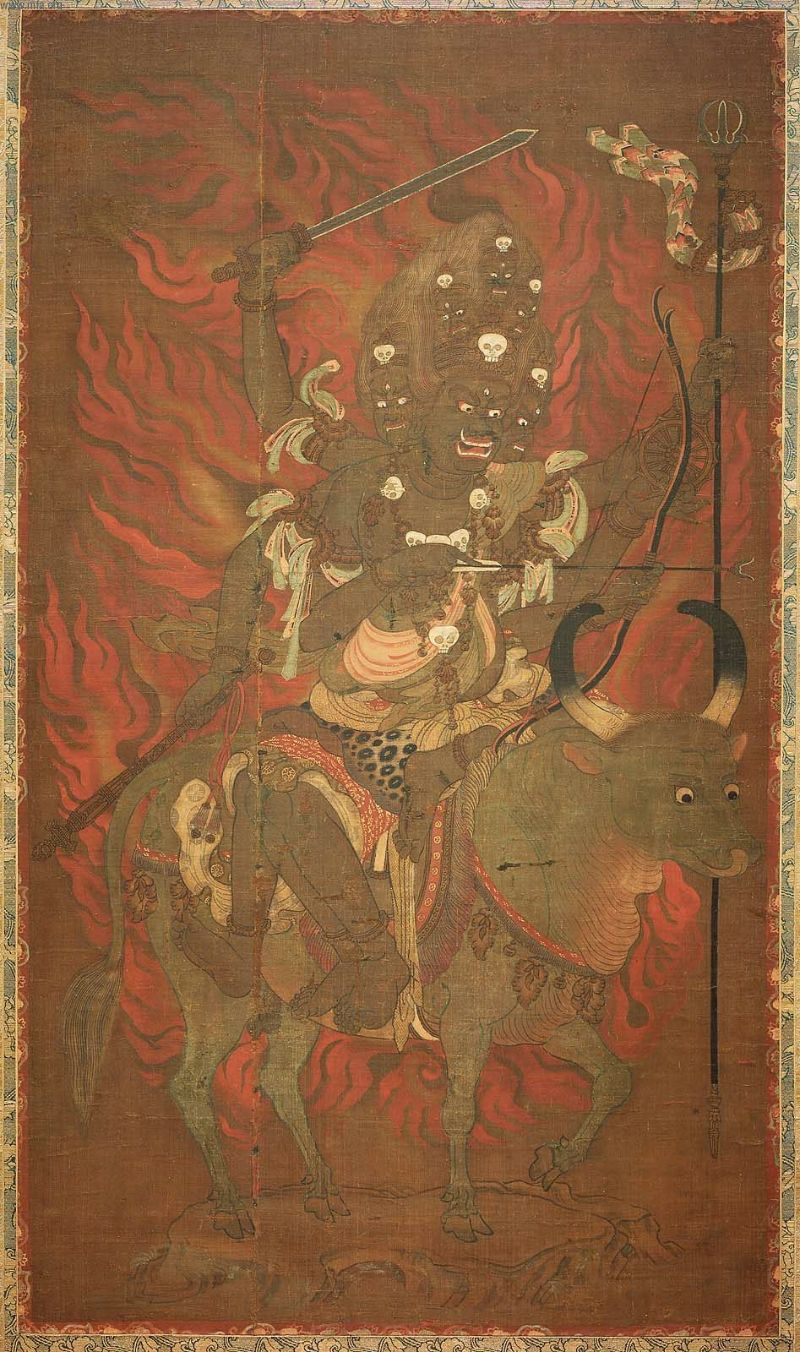
13th century painting of Yamāntaka (Daiitoku myōō) from Japan. Now held at the Museum of Fine Arts, Boston.

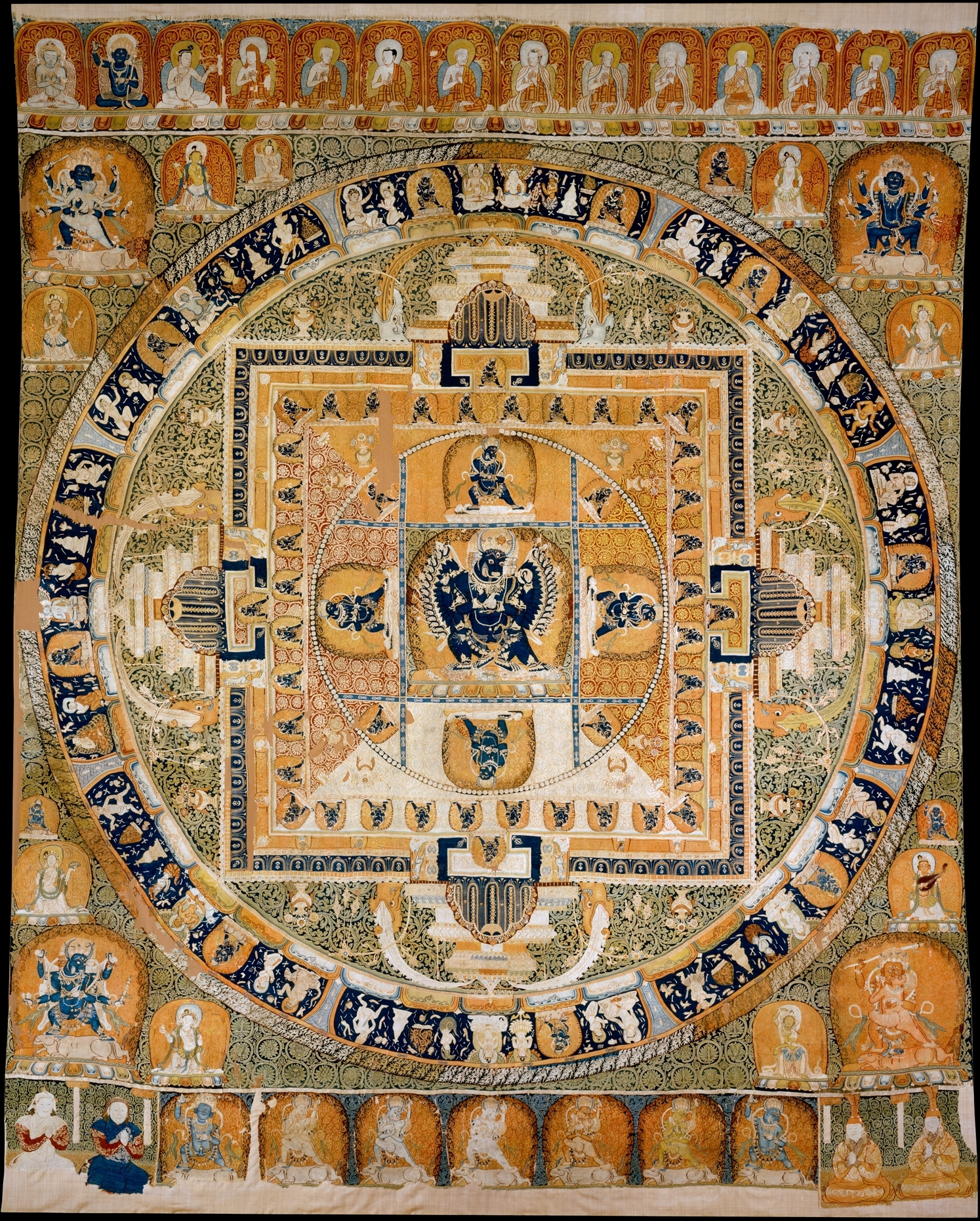
Yamantaka-Vajrabhairava mandala

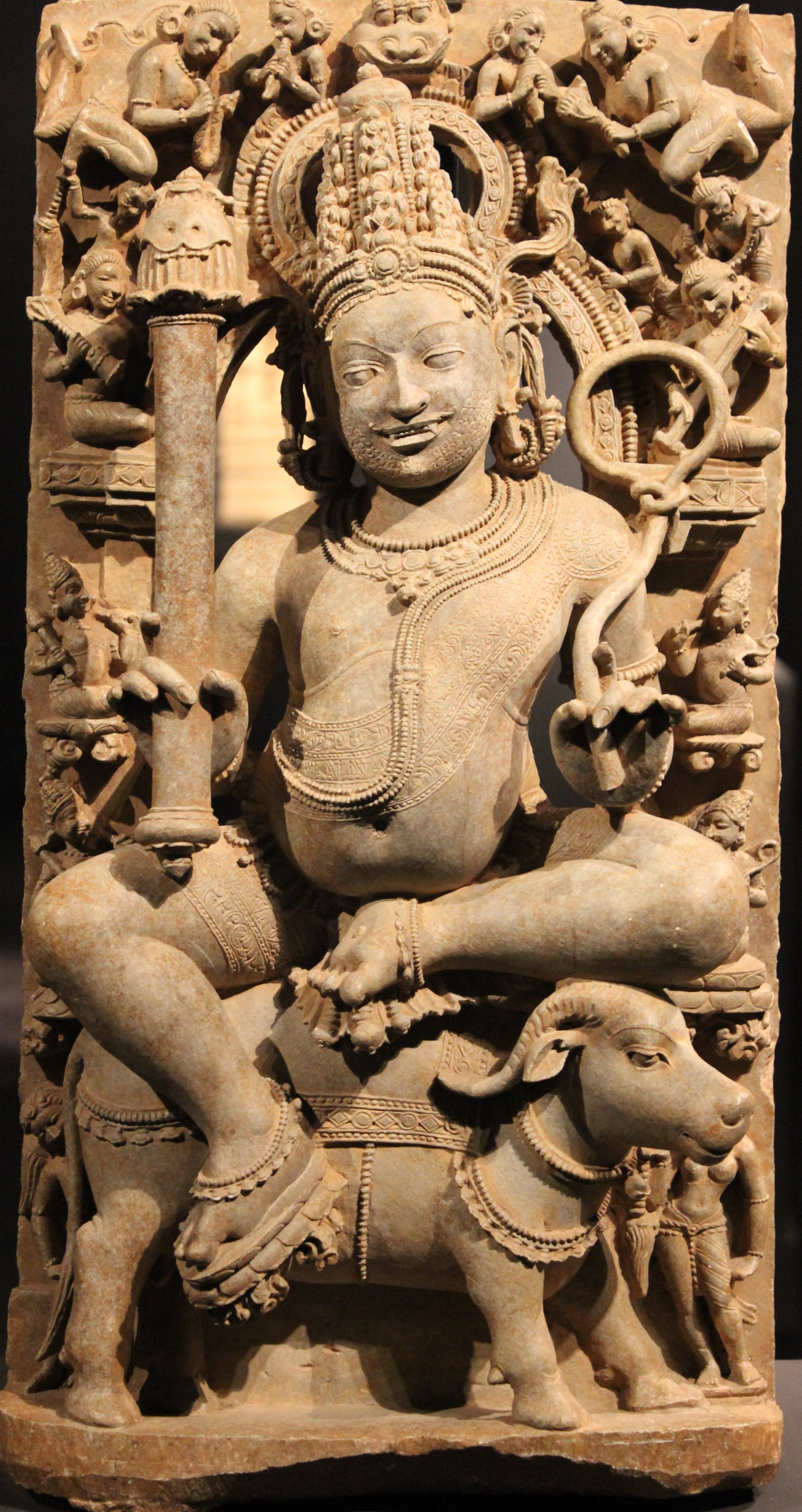
In Hinduism, Yama (Sanskrit: यम), is the lord of death.

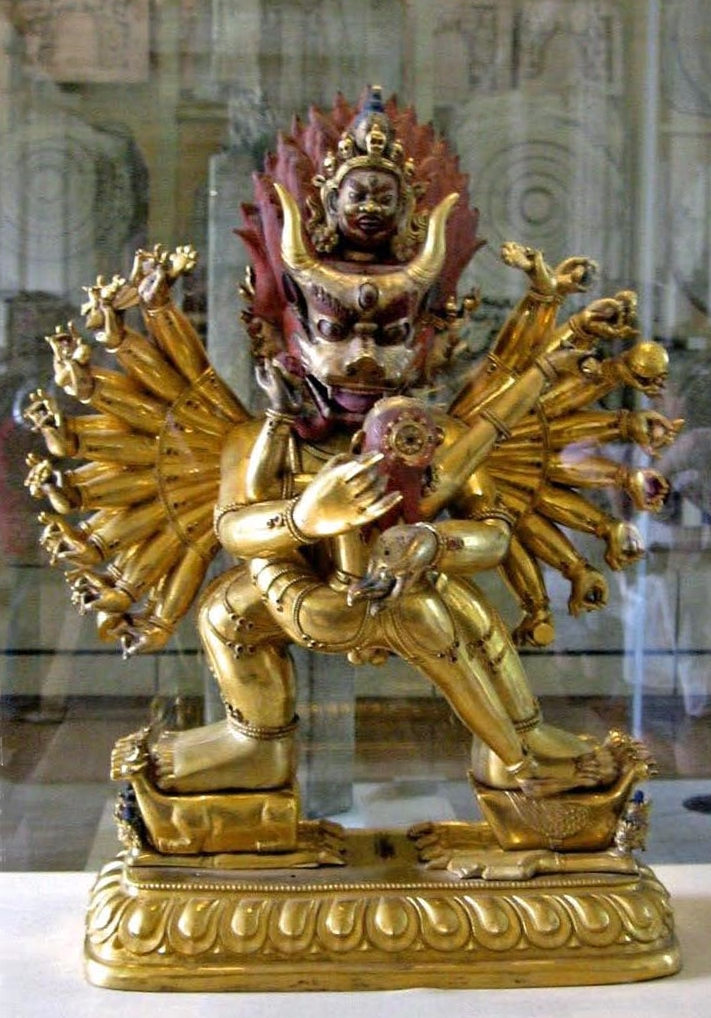
A Tibetan statue of Yamāntaka Vajrabhairava

== See also ==
- Kalantaka (Sanskrit: ender of death and time) is an aspect of the Hindu god Shiva as the Conqueror of Time and Death, itself personified by the god Yama.
