= N. Srinivasan (artist) =

Indian artist (born 1972)

Srinivasan Natarajan
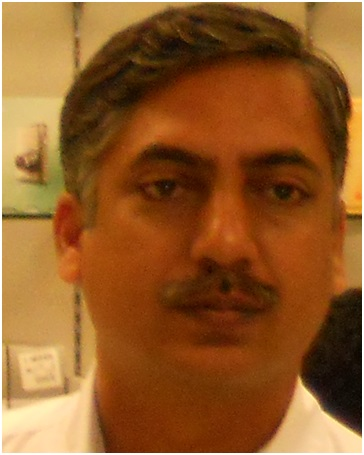
- Srinivasan in 2011.
- Born: 24 January 1972 (age 54); Raja Mannarkudi, Thanjavur district, Tamil Nadu, India
- Occupations: Artist; Writer
- Known for: Painting and fiction
- Website: www.artistsrinivasan.com

N. Srinivasan (born 24 January 1972) is an Indian digital artist in the fields of art and architecture. He uses technology and traditional subject matter for most of his artwork.

== Early life ==
Srinivasan was born on January 24, 1972 in the small village of Thanjavur. In 1996, he completed his Bachelor in Fine Arts at the Government College of Arts and Crafts in Chennai.

He obtained both a Master of Arts and a Master of Philosophy in Public Administration. He completed his Master's Degree in Fine Arts in Painting at the Government College of Fine Arts, studying at Tamil Nadu Music and Fine Arts University, Chennai, in 2016.

== Career ==
Srinivasan works at the School of Architecture and Planning, Anna University, Chennai. In September 2005, he acted as curator for the tsunami art exhibition by NSS students from 230 engineering colleges at the university.

Srinivasan moved from traditional artistic techniques to digital technology. He studied Saiva Siddhanta for three years at the Thiruvaduthurai Mutt and obtained the title "Siddantha Ratnam," which influences his art.

His drawings, digital prints, installations, videos and three-dimensional sculptures have been displayed publicly, including in Mumba, Chennaii, and Coimbatore.

In 2009, the Tamil Nadu Iyal Isai Nataka Manram awarded the Kalaimamani award to Srinivasan for Outstanding Achievements in digital painting. He is the only person to have received the Kalimamani award in the Field of Painting. In 2016, N. Srinivasan and V. Senguttuvan received the APJ Abdul Kalam Memorial Research Award for fine arts.

In 2005, Srinivasan advocated for a Tamil university for fine arts. In 2013, the Tamil Nadu government announced the start up of the new Tamil Nadu Music and Fine Arts University. Srinivasan has also advocated for the preservation of ancient decorated rocks in the Villupuram district. In 2016, he formed an Integrated Village for Arts to teach youth about art.

Srinivasan is a member of the Indian Society for Technical Education, the South Zone Cultural Center Thanjavur, the Bombay Art Society Mumbai, and the Jehangir Art Gallery of Mumbai.

== Publications ==
His Tamil novel, Vidambanam, was released by Kaalachuvadu publications in 2017. He published a technical paper on machine learning at the IEEE International Conference in 2015.

He publishes the Tamil little magazine Mei Porul, which focuses on art and aesthetics related issues. In 2016, Srinivasan became an author for Kanaiyazhi, the monthly Tamil literary magazine.
