= Kalantaka =

Aspect of the Hindu god Shiva

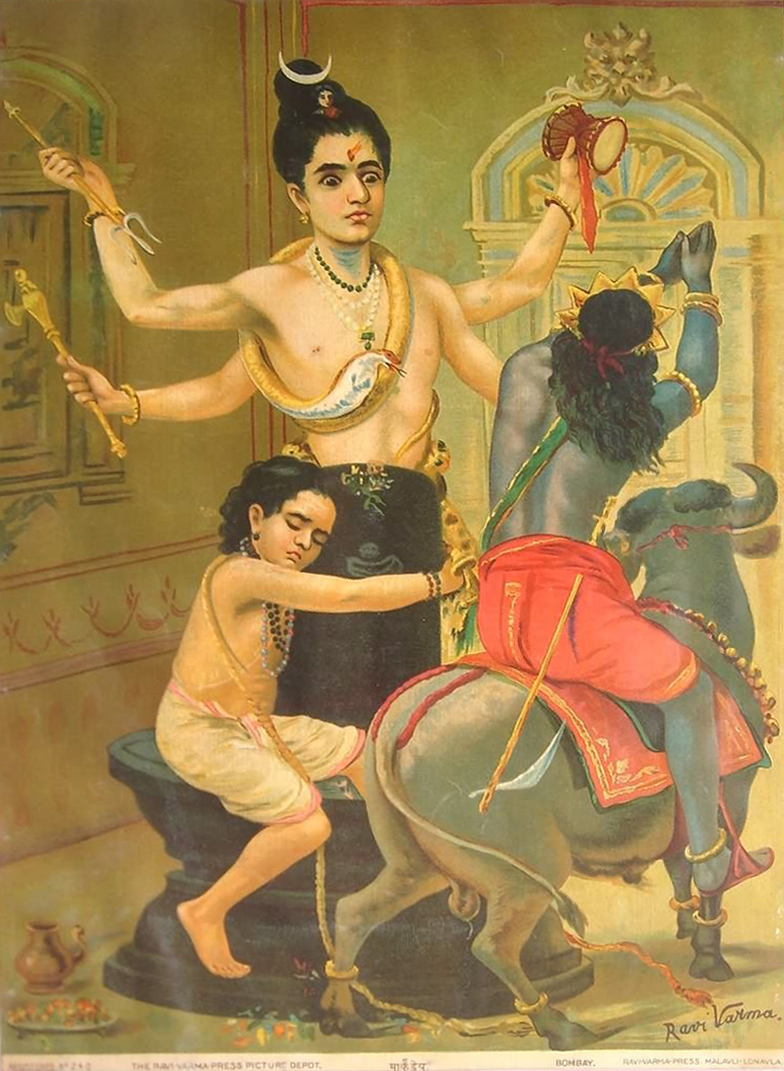
- Raja Ravi Varma's Kalantaka depiction
- Abode: Mount Kailash
- Mantra: oṁ hāum jum sāhā Mahamrityunjaya Mantra
- Weapon: Scimitar, Sword, Trishula (Trident), Parashu
- Festivals: Maha Shivaratri
- Consort: Parvati

Kalantaka (Sanskrit: कालान्तक, ender of time) is an aspect of the Hindu god Shiva as the conqueror of time and death, itself personified by the god Yama. He is depicted as defeating or killing Yama when the latter comes to take the life of Shiva's devotee Markandeya. Shiva is often depicted as dancing on death, personified by Yama.

== Etymology and Other Names ==
The word Kalantaka means "He who ends time". The name is derived from two Sanskrit words- kala (काल) which means "time" and antaka (अन्तक) which means "He who ends". His other names are-

- Kalakala (कालकाल) - the person who is death of death or we can say that the person who can kill the death.
- Kalasamhara (कालसंहार) - slayer of Death.
- Kalari (कालारि) - foe of Death.
- Kalahara (कालहार) - one who destroys Death.
- Kalahari (कालहारी) - one who takes away Death.
- Markandeyanugraha (मार्कण्डेयानुग्रह) - bestowing grace upon Markandeya.
- Mrityunjaya (मृत्युञ्जय) - he who won over Death.

The suffix "murti" meaning image or icon may be added to these names e.g. Kalarimurti, Kalaharamurti or Kalantakamurti.

== Legend ==
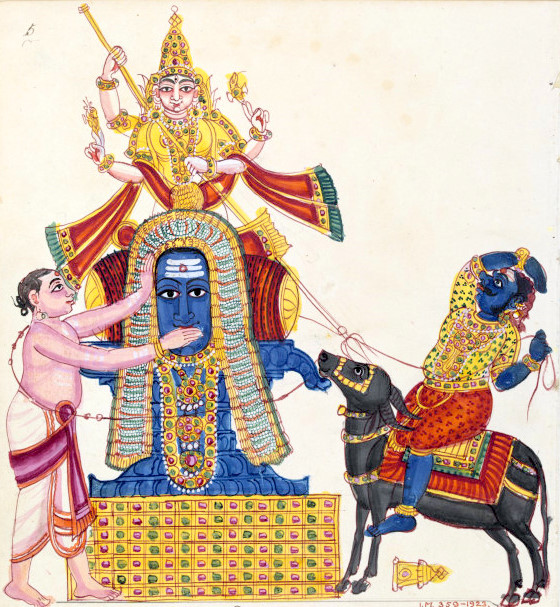
Kalantaka-Shiva emerges as Yama's noose touches the lingam of Thirukkadavoor with Markandeya (left) hugging the lingam

The legend of Shiva as Markandeya's saviour is an important one on salvation in Tamil Shaivism. The following tale is from the Thirukkadavoor shrine, which is dedicated to Kalantaka. The sage Mrikandu prayed to Shiva at Vilvavanam for a son. Shiva offered him a choice: a virtuous son who would live 16 years, or 100 long-lived, foolish sons. Mrikandu chose the former and accordingly had a son, whom he named Markandeya. As Markandeya neared the end of his fifteenth year, the god Brahma taught him a mantra named Mahamrityunjaya Mantra (means "the great death-conquering" mantra- Sanskrit) that conquered death and blessed him with long life. As per Brahma's advice, Markandeya prayed to Shiva, worshipping the lingam (Shiva's aniconic symbol) south of Vilvavanam, later identified with the present Thirukkadavoor. The gods pleaded with Shiva to extend Markandeya's life and Shiva consented.

As per his destiny, the messengers of Yama came to take away Markandeya's soul, but failed to approach him as he ceaselessly repeated Shiva's name. Yama came himself to take Markandeya's soul and told Markandeya to stop his worship and come with him as per his fate. Markandeya refused, warning Yama that he was committing an offence against Shiva. Yama, however, proclaimed that not even Shiva could stop him. The wrathful Yama assumed a fearsome form and threw his noose to capture Markandeya, who hugged the lingam tightly. When the noose touched the lingam, Shiva emerged from it in all his wrath and struck Yama with his Trishula and kicked his chest, killing the Lord of Death.

Sages, gods and other beings appeared to praise Shiva, who blessed Markandeya to remain a youth of 16 for seven kalpas (aeons). As no one remained in the world to make beings die, the Earth became burdened by evil beings. The Earth, the gods, and Markandeya invoked Shiva to revive Yama. Once again, Shiva touched Yama with his foot, bringing him back to life. A sequel from Thiruvanmiyur to this tale narrates how Shiva resurrected Yama on the request of the gods and Yama worshiped Shiva at Thiruvanmiyur to atone for his sin. The Thirukkadavoor and Thiruvanmiyur shrine legends narrate how Yama promises never to touch Shiva's devotees. Shiva's devotees on death are directly taken to Mount Kailash, Shiva's abode, on death and not to Yama's hell.

The legend establishes that the true devotee achieves freedom from death and samsara by worship of Shiva. It also demonstrates that egoism and pride (here of Yama) are always humbled. The superiority of Shiva and his victory over his own nature – Shiva is himself identified with death – is also ascertained.

== Veneration ==
Shiva's portrayal as Kalantaka is popular in South India, but restricted mainly to this region. A relief of Kalantaka in Chidambaram Temple has been turned into a shrine and is offered special worship on Kartik Purnima, the full moon day of the Hindu month of Kartika. The Shiva temple at Thirukkadavoor near Mayiladuthurai is considered as the place where Shiva defeated death in Tamil tradition. Thirukkadavoor or Thirukadaiyur or Tirukkatavur or Tirukkadavur or Katavur (as named in Tevaram) is one of the Atta-virattam, the eight sites of the heroic acts of Shiva.

In Tamil Tevaram poetry, Shiva's feet as often praised as the ones who kicked Death, alluding to the Kalantaka legend. In the Tevaram, Sambandar sings how Shiva helped the devotee who served him by kicking Death and decreed that Death shall not touch his devotee. Appar narrates how Markandeya worshipped Shiva at Thirukkadavoor with devotion and the deity appeared to save him from Death.

The legend of Shiva's manifestation of Kalantaka is believed in local tradition to have happened at Triprangode, Tirur, Malappuram district, Kerala where the Kalasamharamurthy Temple is situated.

== Iconography ==
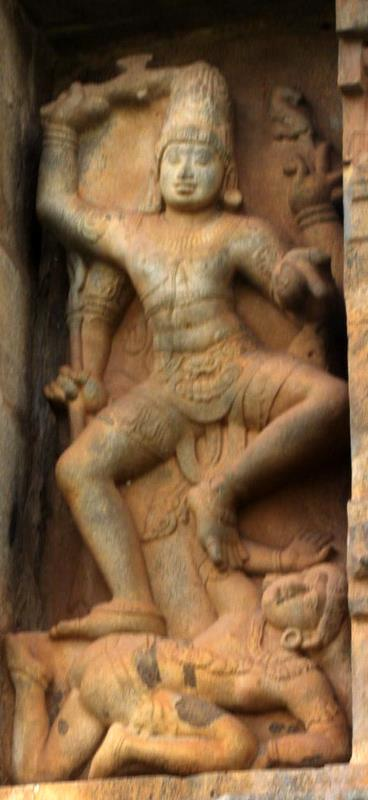
Kalantaka dancing on Yama, Gangaikonda Cholapuram Temple.

The description of Kalantaka is found in Agamic texts. The right foot should be rested on a lotus-pedestal (padma-pitha) and the left leg lifted to kick Yama, just touching his chest. The leg positions are reversed in some textual descriptions. Sometimes, Shiva is depicted as rising from the lingam that Markandeya is worshipping and his right leg is buried in the lingam while the left one raised to strike Yama. Shiva, depicted red in anger, should have a third eye on the forehead, a jatamukuta (a crown of matted hair), lateral tusks and four or eight arms.

In the four-armed form, one of the right hands holding a Trishula should be raised pointing to Yama or sometimes even piercing his torso or neck, while other right hand should hold in a parashu or express the varadamudra (boon-giving gesture). The left hands should be held in vismaya mudra (hand gesture of astonishment) and suchi mudra (needle gesture). In the eight-armed form, the right arms hold a trishula, parashu, vajra and khadga (sword). The left arms hold a khetaka (shield), pasha (noose) and in vismaya and suchi mudras. Sometimes, he may even hold a kapala or a mriga.

Yama is often depicted as bowing to Shiva with folded hands and holding a noose in between them. He is depicted trembling with fear, with legs wide apart suggesting that he is trying to steady himself after being kicked by Shiva. Another configuration portrays him lying fainted on the ground after being kicked by Shiva. Shiva may be depicted as standing or dancing on the fallen Yama. Yama is sometimes mistaken as an apasmara (a dwarf) in this configuration and the image as that of Shiva as Nataraja, the Lord of Dance who is depicted trampling the apasmara.

Markandeya is usually depicted as terrified by the sight of Yama. Seated near the lingam, he worships it with flowers or bows the rising Shiva, his saviour. Markandeya may be also depicted hugging the lingam or just standing in a corner with folded hands.

== See also ==
- Yamāntaka is the "destroyer of death" deity of Vajrayana Buddhism.
