= Abhirami Pattar =

Indian Hindu saint

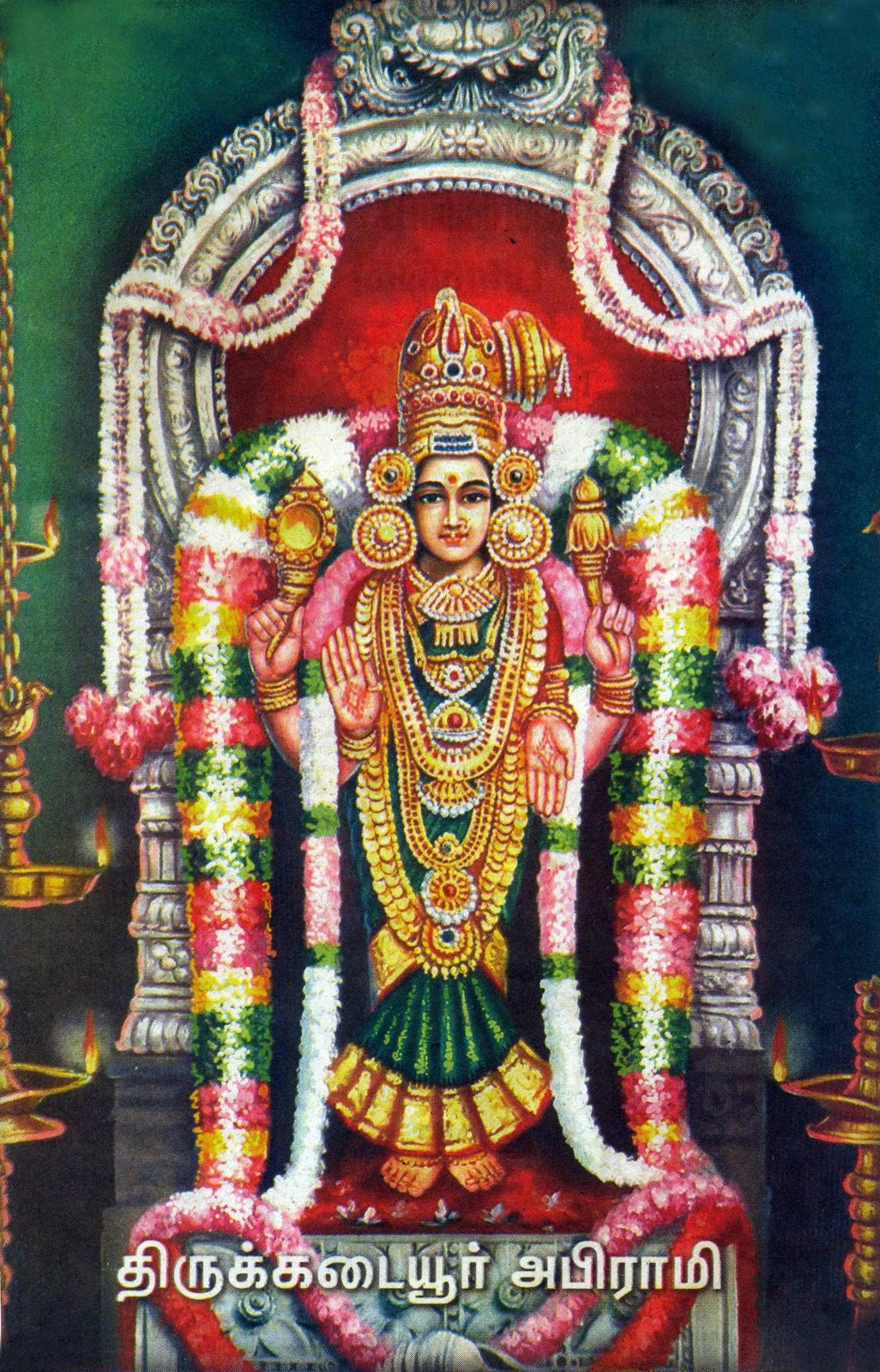
A chromolithograph of Mother Parvati in her incarnation as Abirami

Abhirami Pattar born Subramaniya Iyer was a Hindu saint from the south Indian state of Tamil Nadu. He is famed as the author of a collection of hymns called Abhirami Anthadhi which is widely regarded as one of the foremost works of modern Tamil literature.

== Etymology ==
Abhirami (Tamil: அபிராமி, Lit. She who is attractive at every moment of time) refers to the goddess Abhirami in Thirukadaiyur. Pattar (Tamil: பட்டர்) is the Tamil word for priest. Abhirami Bhattar means The priest of Abhirami.

== Early life ==
Subramaniya Iyer was born to Amirthalinga Iyer in the village of Thirukadaiyur. Thirukkadaiyur has one of many elegant Brahmin quarters near the temple called agraharams established by the Maratha ruler Serfoji I, a great admirer of Brahmin poets and bards, in the early part of the 18th century. The village was famous for its Shiva temple, called Amritaghateswarar-Abirami Temple, Thirukkadaiyur. Right from his childhood, Subramaniya Iyer was drawn to the temple and Goddess Abhirami.

One day, the King visited the temple to pay homage to Lord Shiva. On noticing the peculiar behavior of Subramaniya Iyer who was a temple priest, he inquired the other priests about the individual. One of them remarked that he was a madman while another rejected this categorization explaining to the king that Subramaniya Iyer was only an ardent devotee of Goddess Abhirami. Seeking to know the truth himself, Serfoji approached the priest and asked him what day of the month it was i.e. whether it was a full-moon day or a new-moon day. Subramaniya Iyer who could see nothing else but the shining luminant form of the Goddess before him wrongly answered that it was a full-moon day while it was in fact a new-moon day. The king rode off informing the former that he would be burnt at the stake if the moon did not appear in the sky by six in the night. He stood on the burning platform and prayed to the Goddess Abhirami by reciting Tamil hymns to save him. These hymns form the Abhirami Andaadi. On completion of the 79th hymn, Goddess Abhirami herself appeared before him and threw her earring over the sky such that it shone with bright light upon the horizon. The area around the temple sparkled with bright light. Overcome with ecstasy, Subramaniya Iyer composed 21 more verses in praise of the Goddess. The king repented his mistake and immediately canceled the punishment he had awarded Subramaniya Iyer. He also bestowed upon the latter the title of Abhirami Bhattar or "priest of Goddess Abhirami".

== Devotion to Goddess Abirami ==
As he grew, Iyer developed devotion to goddess Abirami. He would sit in a corner of the temple meditating upon the Goddess and singing her praises. As time passed, he was forever immersed in meditation upon the Goddess that he began to observe the supposed likeliness of the Goddess in the person of the women around him and often showered them with flowers.
