= Porayar Assembly constituency =

Coordinates: 11.02°N 79.83°E

Porayar
- Former constituency for the Tamil Nadu Legislative Assembly

Constituency details
- Country: India
- Region: South India
- State: Tamil Nadu
- District: Mayiladuthurai
- Lok Sabha constituency: Porayar Assembly constituency
- Established: 1962
- Abolished: 1967
- Total electors: 85,974
- Reservation: None

Porayar was one of the 234 constituencies in the Tamil Nadu Legislative Assembly of Tamil Nadu, a southern state of India. It is located in Mayiladuthurai district.

The constituency was disestablished in the year 1967.

== Madras state ==
Year	Winner	Party
1962	K. R. Sambandam	Indian National Congress

== Election results ==
Vote share of winning candidates
1962	39.45%

=== 1962 ===
1962 Madras Legislative Assembly election: Porayar
Party	Candidate	Votes	%	±%
INC	K. R. Sambandam	24,112	39.45%	
DMK	S. Ganesan	21,018	34.39%	
CPI	Bhasathimohan	12,718	20.81%	
SWA	K. Chinnasami Ravuthaminda Nainar	2,826	4.62%	
Independent	Paul Sathianathan	440	0.72%	
Margin of victory		3,094	5.06%	
Turnout		61,114	74.00%	
Registered electors		85,974		
INC win (new seat)				
