= Adanjur A.Singaravel Viruthullar =

Indian politician

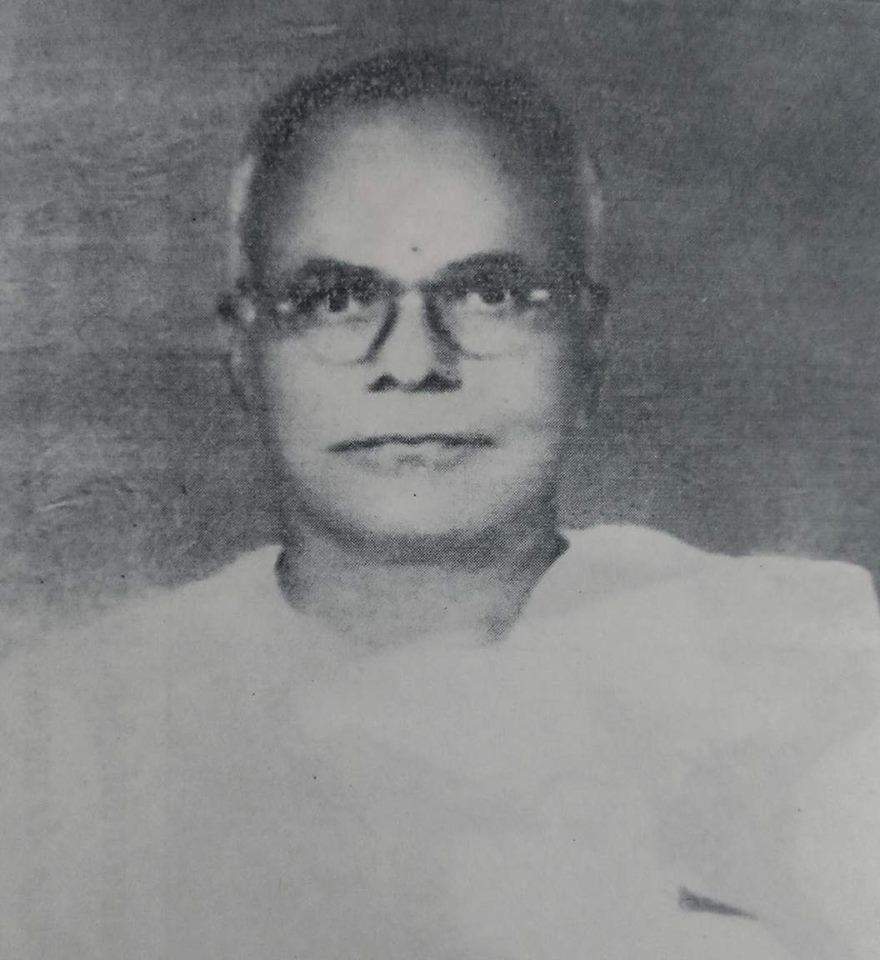
- Viruthullar in 1953
- Born: 1898; Kurkur, Thirukattupalli, Tamil Nadu
- Died: 1960 (aged 61–62)
- Occupations: Agriculturist, Congress leader
- Spouse: Kathammal

Designation

Member of district board
- Incumbent: 1949 - 1959

Adanjur A.Singaravel Viruthullar (1898–1960) was an Indian Congress Party leader, freedom fighter, and agriculturist from the erstwhile Madras presidency.

He was born in Kurkur village, Tiruchirapalli, Tamil Nadu. At 19, he joined the Indian National Army (INA), led by Subhas Chandra Bose, when he was in Malaysia. For over 6 months, he trained and fought the British in the Burma war at the Arakan battlefield. Later, he was forced to surrender and spent 10 months in a Burma jail. After release, he went back to Malaysia before returning to Kurkur, his native village.
