= Markandeya =

Sage in Hindu scriptures

- Member of Chiranjivi
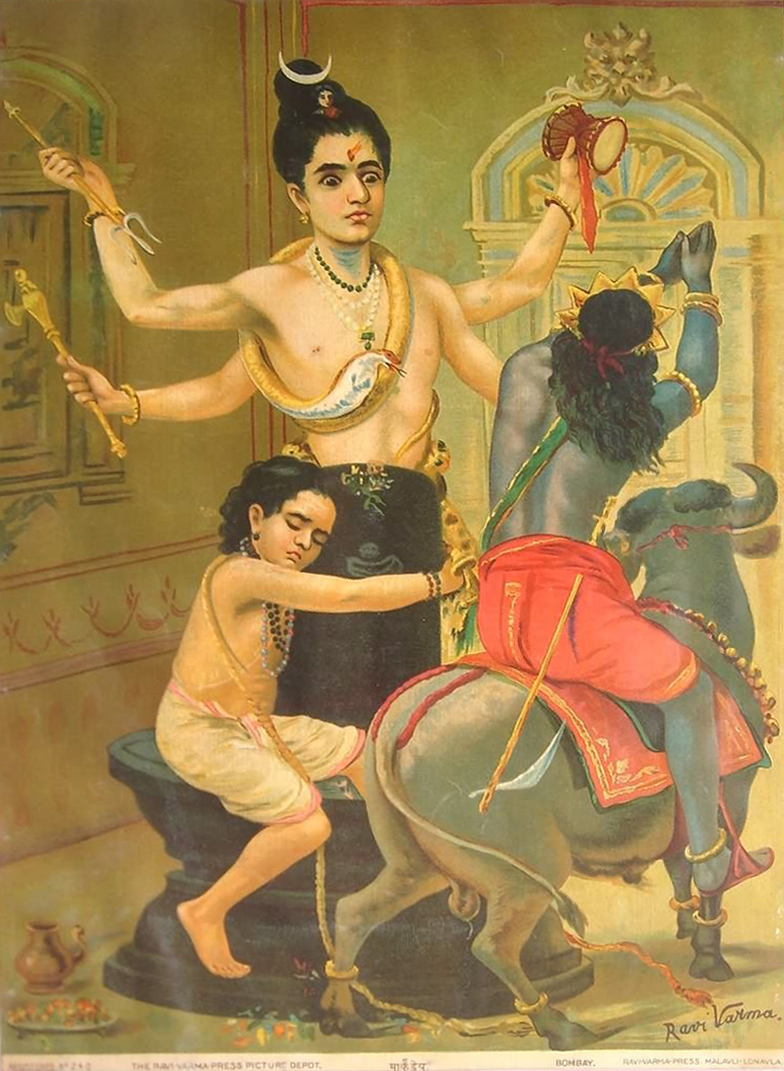
- Shiva protects Markendeya from Yama by Raja Ravi Varma
- Affiliation: Chiranjivi

Genealogy
- Parents: Mrikanda (father); Manasvini (mother)

Markandeya (Sanskrit: मार्कण्‍डेय, romanized: Mārkaṇḍeya) is a rishi (sage) featured in Hindu literature. He is the son of the sage Mrikanda and his wife, Manasvini. The Markandeya Purana (one of the eighteen Mahāpurāṇas in Hinduism), attributed to the sage, comprises a dialogue between Markandeya and a sage called Jaimini. A number of chapters in the Bhagavata Purana are dedicated to his conversations and prayers. He is also mentioned in the Mahabharata. Markandeya is venerated within all mainstream Hindu traditions.

== Legend ==
=== Rescue by Kalantaka-Shiva ===
One legend relates the story of how Shiva, one of the main deities of Hinduism, protected Markandeya from the clutches of death, personified as Yama.

Sage Mrikanda performed penance to propitiate Shiva for several years and sought from him the boon of begetting a son. Shiva offered him the choice of either a virtuous and pious son who would have a short life, or a dull-witted, malicious child who would have a long life. Mrikanda chose the former, and was blessed with Markandeya, an exemplary son, destined to die at the age of sixteen. Markandeya mastered the Vedas and the Shastras and grew up to be a great devotee of Shiva. Learning his fate from his distressed parents shortly before his sixteenth year, he started to engage in severe austerities. On the day of his destined death, he continued his worship of Shiva in the deity's aniconic form of a lingam. The messengers of Yama, the god of death, were unable to take away his life because the power of his devotion to Shiva shielded him against them. Yama came in person to take away Markandeya's life, even as the sage embraced the lingam, crying for help. Yama sprung his noose around the young sage's neck, which also circled the lingam. Angered, Shiva emerged from the lingam, attacking Yama to save his devotee. After slaying Yama, Shiva revived him under the request of the devas, under the condition that Markandeya remain sixteen years old forever. For this act, Shiva acquired the epithet kalantaka (destroyer of time and death).

=== Vision of Pralaya ===
The Bhagavata Purana describes Markandeya worshipping Vishnu for six manvanataras (an age of Manu). Alarmed by the sage's prowess, Indra tasked a number of apsaras, gandharvas, and the god of love, Kamadeva, to disrupt his ascetic practice. The celestial beings travelled to the hermitage of the sage, located on the Himalayas along the banks of the river Pushpabhadra. The sage remained undisturbed by the songs, dances, and attempts of seduction by the beings, after which they fled. Impressed by Markandeya, Vishnu appeared before him in his form of the sage-brothers Nara-Narayana. Markandeya extolled the sage-brothers, and requested that he be granted a sight of Vishnu's maya (illusion), which was granted. One evening, while Markandeya prayed, he experienced a vision of the pralaya, the dissolution of the universe. A great deluge submerged the earth, destroying all living beings, and the sage found himself being the only creature left alive, thrashed by the waters. Even as the torrent propelled him, the sage observed a banyan tree, upon whose branch he saw a dazzling baby upon a leaf. Markandeya marvelled at the sight of its wondrous form. Entering the form of the baby, he witnessed the entire universe, the passage of the ages, all living beings, as well as a vision of his own hermitage. Leaving the baby's form and returning to the vision of the pralaya, the sage attempted to hug the baby, knowing it to be Vishnu himself. The baby vanished, and the maya was subsequently dispelled, returning Markandeya back to his hermitage. Even as Markandeya extolled Vishnu, Shiva and Parvati appeared before the sage, and the latter sang their praises. Pleased by the sage, Shiva offered him a boon. The sage asked for the devotees of Vishnu and Shiva to be blessed. Shiva granted this boon, declaring that Markandeya would also be immortal, gain great religious merit, and also blessed with the authorship of a Purana.

== Veneration ==
Today, the Markandeya Tirtha, where the sage Markandeya is regarded to have written the Markandeya Purana, is situated on a trekking route to the Yamunotri shrine in the Uttarkashi district, Uttarakhand.

The legend of Shiva saving Markandeya is said to have taken place on the bank of river Gomati in Kaithi, Varanasi. An ancient temple known as the Markandeya Mahadeva Temple is made on this site. Alternatively, another story states that this event happened in Kerala, at the site of Triprangode Siva Temple where the Markandeya ran up to the Shiva Linga at the temple to escape from Yama. A source also claims that this incident took place at the Parli Vaijnath Jyotirlinga in the Beed district of Maharashtra. It is also believed to have happened in either of two temples in Tamil Nadu, Thirukkadaiyur or Thiruvanmiyur. Khandya which is in Chikmaglur district of Karnataka. Also houses a shrine dedicated to Markhandeya Shiva - Mrityunjaya and legend (Sthala Purana) says that Markhandeya held on to this Shiva Linga. There are marks of a child clinging on to the Linga here. The name "Khandya" is also the short form of Markhandeya. People do 'Asthi Visarjan' here as the river Bhadra flows westerwardly direction (Paschimavaahini).

== Literature ==
=== Sapta Chiranjivi Stotram ===
The Sapta Chiranjivi Stotram is a mantra that is featured in Hindu literature:

अश्वत्थामा बलिर्व्यासो हनुमांश्च विभीषण:।
कृप: परशुरामश्च सप्तैतै चिरञ्जीविन:॥
सप्तैतान् संस्मरेन्नित्यं मार्कण्डेयमथाष्टमम्।
जीवेद्वर्षशतं सोपि सर्वव्याधिविवर्जितः॥

aśvatthāmā balirvyāsō hanumāṁśca vibhīṣaṇaḥ।
kṛpaḥ paraśurāmaśca saptaitai cirañjīvinaḥ॥
saptaitān saṁsmarēnnityaṁ mārkaṇḍēyamathāṣṭamam।
jīvēdvarṣaśataṁ sopi sarvavyādhivivarjitaḥ॥

— Sapta Chiranjivi Stotram

The mantra states that the remembrance of the eight immortals, or the Chiranjivi (Ashwatthama, Mahabali, Vyasa, Hanuman, Vibhishana, Kripa, Parashurama, and Markandeya) offers one freedom from ailments and longevity.

=== The Markandeya Purana ===
The Markandeya Purana is one of the eighteen major Puranas of Hinduism. It is narrated by sage Markandeya himself to sage Jaimini and contains many topics such as cosmology, philosophy, theology, dharma, and karma. Detailed descriptions of sacred places and rituals are in this Purana as well. The Markandeya Purana presents Lord Shiva to be the supreme deity and includes many stories to show his divine virtues and characteristics. Moreover, it includes the Devi Mahatmya, which emphasizes goddess Durga's virtues such as her role as the embodiment of Shakti and her ability to destroy evil for the protection of her devotees.

=== Appearance in the Mahabharata ===
In the Markandeya-Samasya Parva in the Vana Parva of the Mahabharata, a conversation takes place between Markandeya and the oldest Pandava brother Yudhishthira. As a result of the game of dice in Hastinapur, the five Pandava brothers and their wife Draupadi are exiled into the forest for 12 years and one extra year in hiding. Traumatized by the events of the game of dice Yudhishthira felt restless and upset and wanted to find peace and guidance. He goes to sage Markandeya with many questions and concerns. Yudhishthira went to the right man for guidance, for the great sage had lived through and experienced the great deluge, which gave him a large perspective on life. As part of their conversation, Markendeya narrates to him the story of the great deluge and his incident with lord Vishnu.

== Films on Markandeya ==
- Markandeya (1922)
- Shri Markandeya Avtaar (1922)
- Markandeya (1935)
- Bhakta Markandeya (1938)
- Bhakta Markandeya (1956)
- Bhakta Dhruva Markandeya (1982)

== See also ==
- Narada
- Prahlada
- Four Kumaras
- Hindu calendar
- Saptarishi
- Chiranjivins
