= Thirukkadaiyur =

Thirukkadaiyur Thirukkadavur
- village
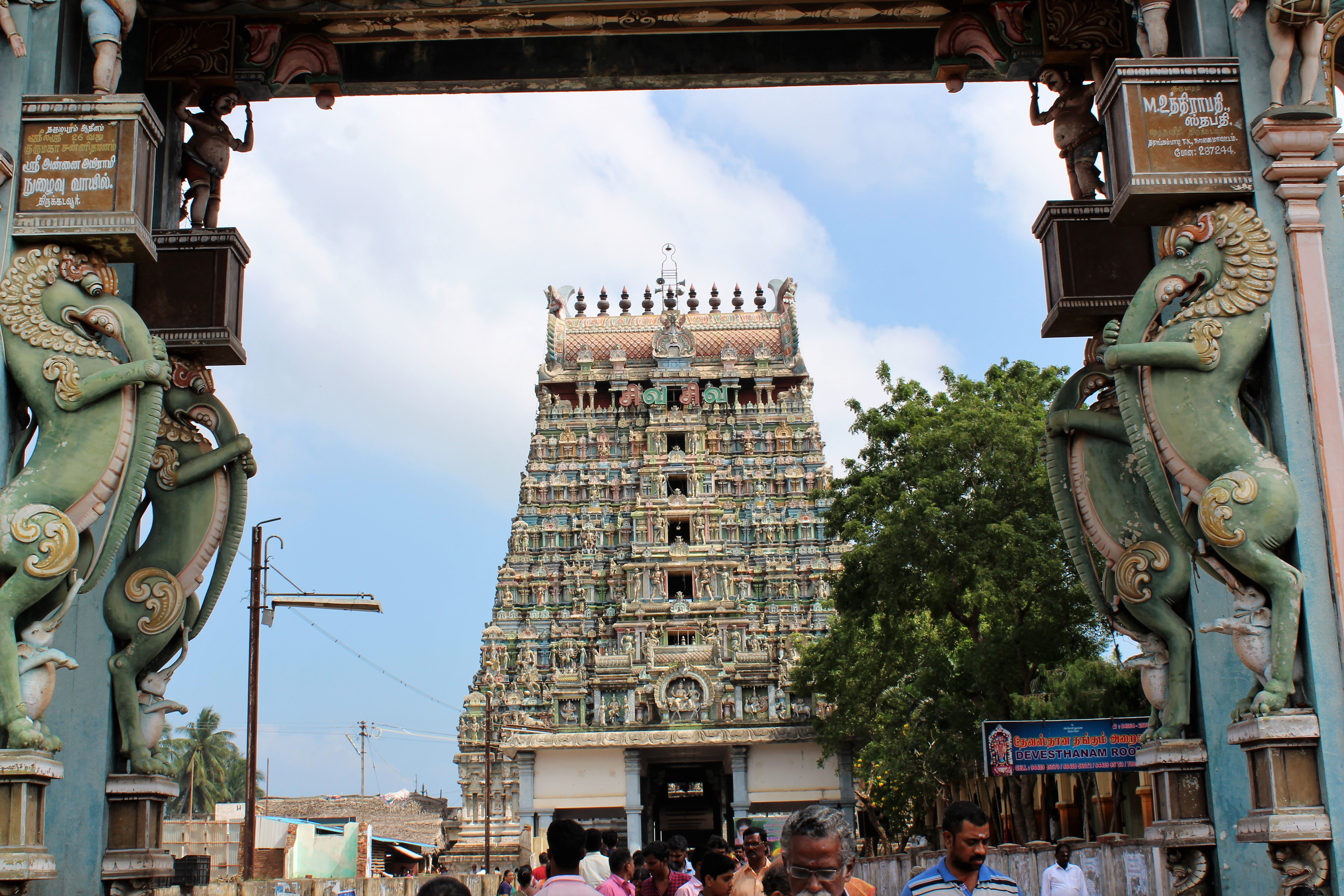

- Location in Tamil Nadu, India Thirukkadaiyur (India)
- Coordinates: 11°4′27″N 79°48′31″E
- Country: India
- State: Tamil Nadu
- District: Mayiladuthurai

Languages
  - Official: Tamil
- Time zone: UTC+5:30 (IST)
- Postal code: 609311
- Vehicle registration: TN82

Thirukkadaiyur (Thirukadavur) is a village on the east coast of Tamil Nadu, about 300 km (190 mi) south of Chennai, 21 km (13 mi) from the district headquarters of Mayiladuthurai, and 23 km (14 mi) north of Karaikal. The history of the village is associated with the legends of Markandeya and Abirami Pattar. The village is centered around Amritaghateswarar - Abirami Temple of Tirukkadaiyur, a replica. The original temple, Thirumeignanam Gnanaparameswarar Temple, called Thirumeignanam, built in the 11th century, was ravaged by the sea, and is in ruins now. People worship and pray at Thirukkadaiyur temple to have a longer life.

In modern times, the village is part of Mayiladuthurai district and is administered by a village panchayat. As per the 2021 census, the village had a population of 6,244. The village is connected by bus transport and is located on the Chidambaram - Nagapattinam highway. There is a small seaport under the control of the Tamil Nadu Maritime Board.

== Legend ==
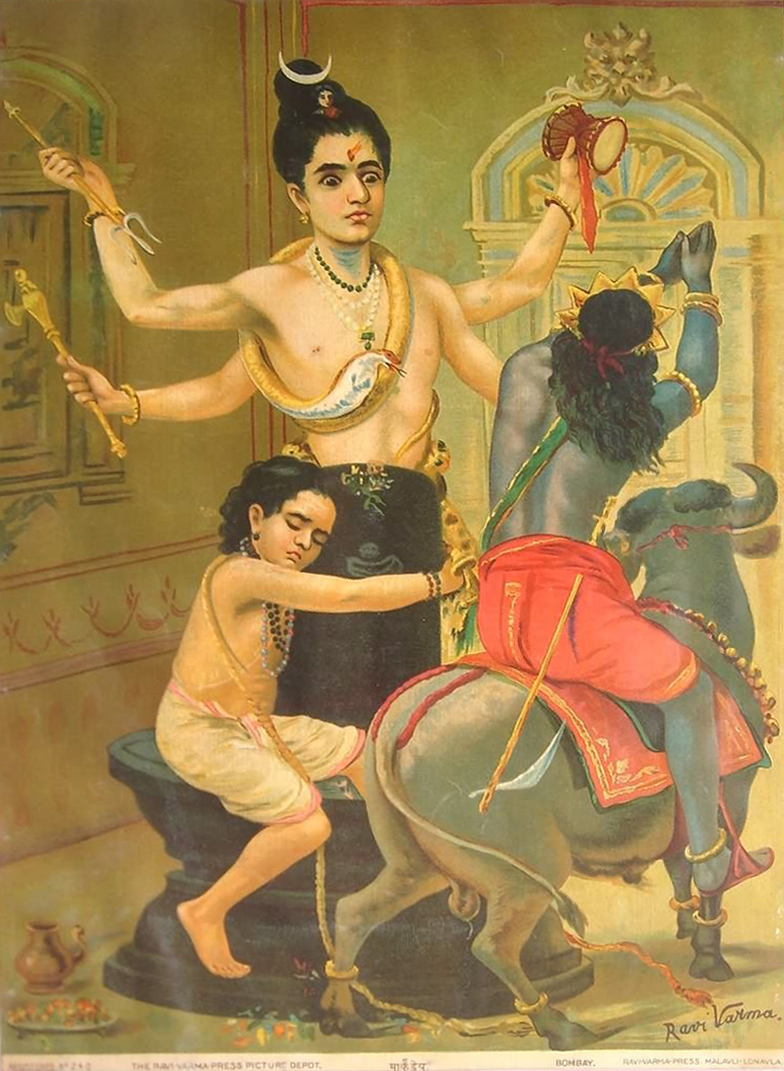
Shiva saving Markendeya from Yama

Thirukkadaiyur derives its name from the pot, called Gatam in Tamil. Vishnu, Indra, and the other Devas needed an outstanding place to consume the Amrita that had been churned during the Samudra manthan and, therefore, brought the Amrita pot here. Before consuming it, they forgot to worship Ganesha, who has to be worshipped before any great undertaking. Ganesha, hurt and offended at the unintentional slight by them, stole the pot of Amrita and hid it at Tirukkadaiyur. Ganesha created a Shiva Lingam, dedicated to his father and mother, and poured some of the Amrita over it. The Shiva Lingam at this temple is known as Amrita Ghat Eshwarar, which, translated from Sanskrit literally means "Lord who leads to immortality" ('Immortality' (Amrita) 'Step' (Ghat) 'Lord' (Eshwarar)). It is also believed that Abhirami was incarnated here by the power of Vishnu. As per popular legend, near the temple of Tirukkadaiyur, there lived a sage named Mrikandu and his wife Marudmati. They were both devotees of Shiva and worshipped him day and night for many years, asking to be graced with a child. After many years of penance, Shiva appeared before Mrikandu and Marudmati. He told them that he heard their prayers and would give them a choice: they could either have a gifted son who would live only up to sixteen years, or a son of low intelligence who would live a longer life. Mrikandu and Marudmati chose the former, and had Markandeya, an exemplary son, destined to die at the age of sixteen.

As Markandeya grew, so did his devotion to Shiva. As advised by his father, Markandeya worshipped the Shiva Lingam at Tirukkadaiyur, even bringing water from the Ganges to the temple via an underground passage. On the day he was destined to die, Yama, the deity of death, appeared with his noose in his hand to tie around the soul of Markandeya and take it away with him. Markandeya sought refuge in the temple and embraced the Siva Lingam. Shiva appeared and warned Yama not to touch Markandeya, as he was under his protection. Yama refused to listen and threw the noose, binding around both Markandeya and the Lingam together. Angered by Yama's extraordinary arrogance, Shiva kicked and held him under his foot, thereby making him inactive. Markandeya was blessed by Shiva to remain sixteen years old eternally. Meanwhile, with Yama being rendered inactive, there were no deaths on earth, but people were still being born. Burdened by the weight of so many people and unable to sustain their hunger, the earth-goddess, Bhumi Devi, appealed to Shiva for help. Shiva, feeling compassionate for the earth-goddess, released Yama, allowing deaths to occur again. However, in order to remind Yama never to try again to kill any one who is worshiping Shiva, the icon of Shiva in this temple is depicted with his forefinger raised in warning about it.

== History ==
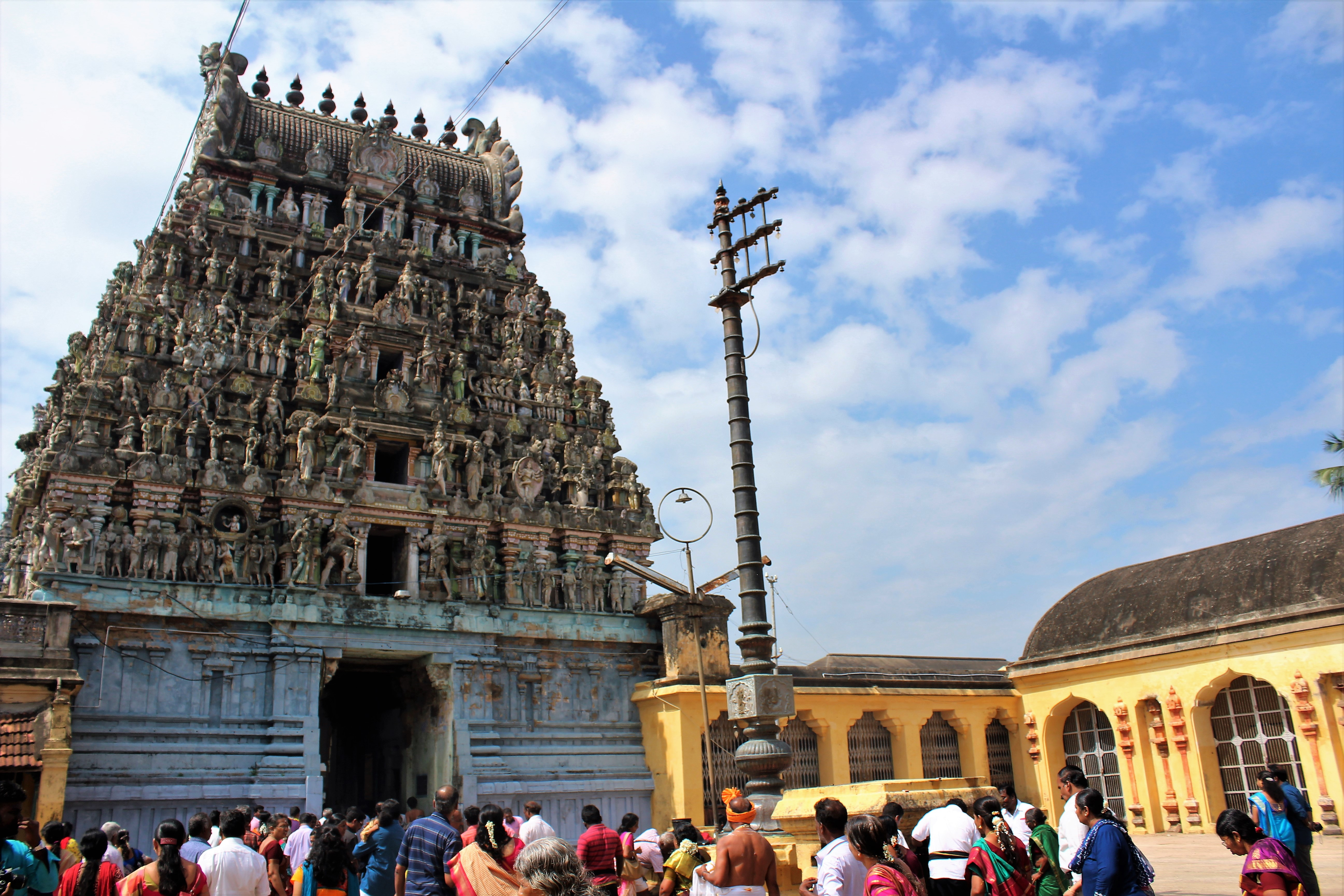
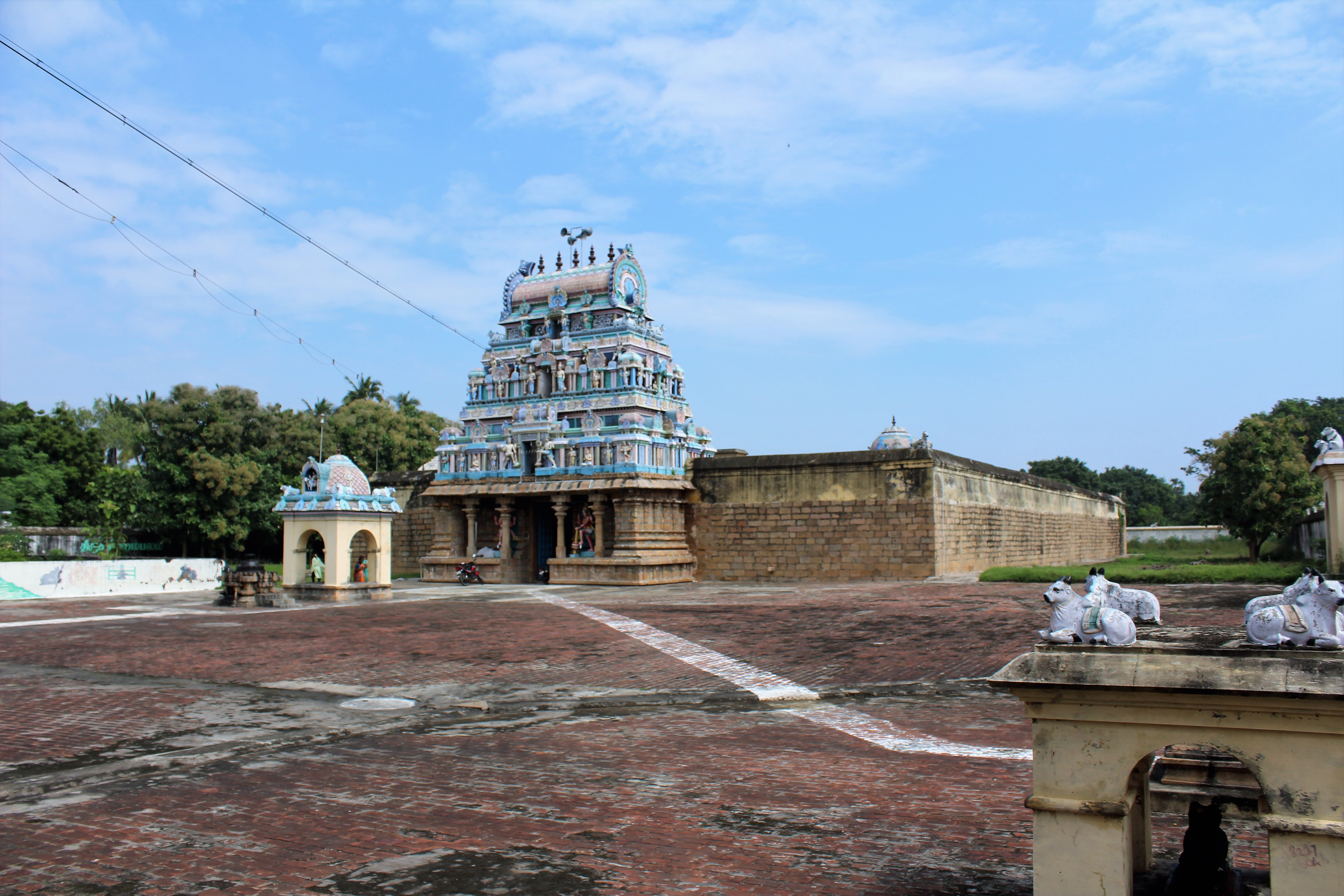
Shrines of both the temples

There are several inscriptions in the temple belonging to the Medieval Cholas. On the southern wall in the central shrine, there is an inscription from the 13th year reign of the king, Rajaraja I Cholan, indicating stipulation of delivering paddy to the temple by a merchant in return to the land offered by the temple. Another inscription in the temple indicates the record (ARE 242 of 1925) of a gift of paddy to the temple by the king, Rajendra Chola, for conducting an eight-days temple festival annually. A third inscription on the same wall indicates a record dated to 1054 AD from the reign of the king, Rajadhiraja Chola informs about a gift of land by a devotee to feed 17 devotees. The fourth inscription (ARE 244 of 1925) in the shrine from the period of the king, Kulothunga Chola I, indicates that Mahasabha of Tirukadavur selling 1.74 velis of land that had been lying fallow for 50 years. Another interesting inscription from the outer precinct from the period of the king, Rajaraja II Cholan indicates confiscation of lands from a custodian of a temple who colluded with Vaishnavites (worshipers of Vishnu). There are also several other inscriptions indicating donations for performing art, drama, dance and music. The temple is maintained and administered by the Dharmapuram Adheenam.

== Culture, Administration and utility services ==
As per the 2021 census, the village had a population of 6,244. The village is connected by bus transport and is located on the Chidambaram - Nagapattinam highway. There are three secondary schools and one senior secondary school in the village. There are a total of 1,528 households and the total area of the village is 793.4 ha (1,961 acres). There was one medical practitioner with M.B., B.S. degree and four other medical systems practitioners. Being a tourist village, the public transports like autorickshaws, car-taxis and buses are common. The village also has an Anganwadi centre and noon meal nutrition centre. The village is also agrarian with a total of 455.3 ha (1,125 acres) irrigated lands. The village has a minor port close to the private PPN Power Generating Company. The port is under the control of Tamil Nadu Maritime Board. Shastiapthapoorthi (60th birthday), Bhimaradha Shanthi (70th birthday), Sadabishegam (80th birthday) and other Ayul Shanthi fire worships are very famous here.

== Accessibility ==
The village is connected by buses from Mayiladuthurai to Porayar. The buses travelling to Porayar, Karaikal, Nagapattinam stop at Thirukkadaiyur bus-stop.
