= List of Tamil films of 1965 =

Post-amendment to the Tamil Nadu Entertainments Tax Act 1939 on 1 April 1958, Gross jumped to 140 per cent of Nett Commercial Taxes Department disclosed ₹5.12 crore in entertainment tax revenue for the year.

The following is a list of films produced in the Tamil film industry in India in 1965, in alphabetical order.

== 1965 ==
Title	Director	Production	Music	Cast
Aasai Mugam	P. Pullaiah	Mohan Productions	S. M. Subbaiah Naidu	M. G. Ramachandran, B. Saroja Devi, M. N. Nambiar K. D. Santhanam, Nagesh, Ramadas
Aavathellaam Pennaale; Dubbed from Telugu Dhampathyam 1957 film	E. Appa Rao	Lingampatti Muthaiah (Nadar Films)	Jeevan	Dialogues: Chandar
Ayirathil Oruvan	B. R. Panthulu	Padmini Pictures	Viswanathan–Ramamoorthy	M. G. Ramachandran, Jayalalitha, M. N. Nambiar Nagesh, Manohar, Ramadas
Anandhi	P. Neelakantan	A.L.S. Productions	M. S. Viswanathan	S. S. Rajendran, C. R. Vijayakumari, M. R. Radha
Anbu Karangal	K. Shankar	Santhi Films	R. Sudarsanam	Sivaji Ganesan, Manimala Devika, Nagesh K. Balaji
Enga Veettu Penn	Tapi Chanakya	Vijaya Combines Productions	K. V. Mahadevan	A. V. M. Rajan, Jaishankar, Vijaya Nirmala, Vasantha
Enga Veettu Pillai	Tapi Chanakya	Vijaya Combines Productions	Viswanathan–Ramamoorthy	M. G. Ramachandran, B. Saroja Devi, S. V. Ranga Rao
Ennathan Mudivu	K. S. Gopalakrishnan	Ravi Productions	R. Sudarsanam	A. V. M. Rajan, Anjali Devi, Vasanthi, T. S. Balaiah
Hello Mister Zamindar	K. J. Mahadevan	Sudarsanam Pictures	Viswanathan–Ramamoorthy	Gemini Ganesan, Savitri, M. R. Radha
Idhaya Kamalam	L. V. Prasad	Prasad Productions	K. V. Mahadevan	Ravichandran, K. R. Vijaya, T. S. Balaiah
Iravum Pagalum	Joseph Thaliath Jr.	Citadel Studios	T. R. Pappa	Jaishankar, Vasantha, Nagesh
Kaakum Karangal	A. C. Tirulokchandar	AVM Productions	K. V. Mahadevan	S. S. Rajendran, S. V. Ranga Rao, C. R. Vijayakumari Sivakumar
Kaattu Rani	M. A. Thirumugam	Dhandayuthapani Films	P. S. Diwakar	K. R. Vijaya, S. A. Ashokan, K. Balaji, Sheela
Kalangarai Vilakkam	K. Shankar	Saravana Films	M. S. Viswanathan	M. G. Ramachandran, B. Saroja Devi, Nagesh Nambiar, G. Sakunthala, Gopala Krishnan
Kalyana Mandapam	Maa. Raa.	Dhanalakshmi Theatres	R. Parthasarathy	C. L. Anandan, K. R. Vijaya, Ravichandran, R. S. Manohar
Kanni Thai	M. A. Thirumugam	Devar Films	K. V. Mahadevan	M. G. Ramachandran, Jayalalitha, V. K. Ramasamy, Nagesh, Manorama
Karthigai Deepam	A. Kasilingam	M. K. Movies	R. Sudarsanam	S. A. Ashokan, C. Vasantha, Leelavathi, Vijayan
Kuzhandaiyum Deivamum	Krishnan–Panju	AVM Productions	M. S. Viswanathan	Jaishankar, Jamuna, Nagesh Sundarrajan
Maganey Kel	Mukta V. Srinivasan	Naval Films	Viswanathan–Ramamoorthy	S. S. Rajendran, Pushpalatha
Maha Bharatham	Chandrakanth	Hari Krishna Movies	G. Devarajan	
Naanal	K. Balachander	Saravana Pictures	V. Kumar	K. R. Vijaya, Muthuraman, Sowkar Janaki
Nee!	T. R. Ramanna	Sri Vinayaka Pictures	M. S. Viswanathan	Jaishankar, Jayalalitha
Neela Vaanam	P. Madhavan	Pattu Films	M. S. Viswanathan	Sivaji Ganesan, Devika, Rajashree
Neerkumizhi	K. Balachander	Arunachalam Pictures	V. Kumar	Nagesh, Major Sundarrajan, V. Gopalakrishnan
Oru Viral	C. M. V. Raman	Associated Artistes	Vedha	Krishna Rao, Thengai Srinivasan, Radhika
Paditha Manaivi	N. Krishnaswamy	Bala Movies	K. V. Mahadevan	S. S. Rajendran, C. R. Vijayakumari, S. V. Ranga Rao, M. R. Radha, Manorama
Panam Padaithavan	T. R. Ramanna	R. R. Pictures	Viswanathan–Ramamoorthy	M. G. Ramachandran, K. R. Vijaya, Sowcar Janaki, R. S. Manohar
Panam Tharum Parisu	M. Krishnaswamy	Surya Films	Chelladurai; T. S. Nades	Thiruchi Soundararajan, S. M. Raman, V. N. Ramalingam, M. K. Manavalan, A. V. Prabhakar, V. R. Thilakam, Ramanathilakam, Rathnadevi, Kamaladevi
Panchavarna Kili	K. Shankar	Saravana Films	Viswanathan–Ramamoorthy	Jaishankar, R. Muthuraman, K. R. Vijaya, Nagesh
Pandava Vanavasam	K. Kameshwara Rao	Madhavi Production	Venkateswara Rao	T. S. Balaiah, Haranath, satya narayanan
Pazhani	A. Bhim Singh	Bharatha Matha Pictures	Viswanathan–Ramamoorthy	Sivaji Ganesan, Devika, S. S. Rajendran
Poojaikku Vandha Malar	Mukta V. Srinivasan	Muktha Films	Viswanathan–Ramamoorthy	Gemini Ganesan, Savitri, Manimala, Nagesh
Poomalai	P. Neelakantan	Mekala Pictures	T. R. Pappa	S. S. Rajendran, C. R. Vijayakumari, Anjali Devi
Sarasa B.A.	Valampuri Somanathan	Ganesh Films	Vedha	Vasanthi, Banumathi, T. S. Balaiah
Santhi	A. Bhim Singh	A. L. S. Productions	Viswanathan–Ramamoorthy	Sivaji Ganesan, Devika, M. R. Radha
Thayin Karunai	G. V. Iyer	G. V. Iyer	G. K. Venkatesh	Kalyan Kumar, R. Muthuraman, M. V. Rajamma, Leelavathi, Vandhana
Thaayum Magalum	M. A. Thirumugam	Dhandayuthapani Films	P. S. Diwakar	Adhityan, S. A. Ashokan, K. R. Vijaya, B. Saroja Devi, Nagesh
Thazhampoo	N.S. Ramadas	Sri Balamurugan Pictures	K. V. Mahadevan	M. G. Ramachandran, K. R. Vijaya, S. A. Ashokan
Thiruvilaiyadal	A. P. Nagarajan	Sri Vijayalakshmi Pictures	K. V. Mahadevan	Sivaji Ganesan, Savitri, Nagesh
Unnaipol Oruvan	D. Jayakanthan	J. K. Combines	Chitti Babu	Nagesh, Gandhimadhi, A. K. Veerasamy
Vallavanukku Vallavan	R. Sundaram	Modern Theaters	Vedha	S. A. Ashokan, Manimala, R. S. Manohar, Gemini Ganesan, K. A. Thangavelu
Vazhikatti	K. Perumal	Kanaga Movies	Ibrahim	S. S. Rajendran, C. R. Vijayakumari, Rajasree, V. K. Ramasamy.
Vaazhkai Padagu	C. Srinivasan	Gemini Studios	Viswanathan–Ramamoorthy	Gemini Ganesan, Devika, R. Muthuraman
Veera Abhimanyu	V. Madhusudhana Rao	Rajalakshmi Pictures	K. V. Mahadevan	Gemini Ganesan, A. V. M. Rajan, Kanchana
Vennira Aadai	Sridhar	Chitralaya Films	Viswanathan–Ramamoorthy	Srikanth, Vennira Aadai Nirmala, Jayalalitha
Vilakketriyaval	Joseph Thaliath Jr.	Citadel Movies	T. R. Pappa	Adithyan, Vasantha, M. R. Radha, S. V. Ramadas, S. A. Ashokan
