= Aaroor Dass =

Indian screenwriter (1931–2022)

Kalaimamani Aaroor Dass
- Born: Yesudas; 10 September 1931; Thiruvarur, Madras Presidency, British India (now Tamil Nadu, India)
- Died: 20 November 2022 (aged 91); Chennai, Tamil Nadu, India
- Other name: Aarooraan
- Occupation: Screenwriter
- Spouse: Baby
- Children: Thara, Usha, Asha (daughter); Ravichandran (Son)
- Parent(s): Santhyagu (Father); Arockiya Mary (Mother)
- Awards: Kalaimamani; Kavingnar Vaali Award (2016); Makkal Kavingnar Award

Sathyagu Yesudas (10 September 1931 – 20 November 2022) known by his stage name Aaroor Dass, was an Indian stage, film and television Screenwriter who was active in Tamil cinema during the latter part of the 20th century. Aaroor Dass has written the story and dialogues for over 1000 films, who dominate the Tamil film for more than 40 years. He wrote his first film for actor Sivaji Ganesan's Pasamalar (1961). He debuted as a director with the film Penn Endral Penn (1967).

== Early life ==
Dass was born on 10 September 1931 to Arockiya Mary and Santhyagu as Yesudas at Thiruvarur, Nagapattinam. He had three younger brothers and three younger sisters. Aaroor Dass attended Thiruvarur Jilla Board Higher Secondary School. Aaroor refers to Thiruvarur.

== Career ==
Dass started his career as an assistant to Thanjai N. Ramaiah Dass in 1955 and assisted in writing the dialogues for the film called Naattiya Thara. He has said that he named his first child as Arokyamary and also gave a pet name, Thara Devi in remembrance of this film. He wrote his debut film as Vaazha Vaitha Deivam (1959) produced by Sandow M. M. A. Chinnappa Thevar. Then, he wrote next film for Sivaji Ganesan's Pasamalar (1961) and continued to write for the thespian in 28 films. When he wrote Pasamalar, Das was 28 years, Sivji Ganesan was 32 and Savitri was 24. He wrote for nearly the same number of M. G. Ramachandran too (including a few that were not released). Dass worked with many top class directors of yesteryears, like A. Bhimsingh, A. C. Tirulokchandar, M. A. Thirumugam and many others. He was associate director under Tirulokchandar and Dever films. He has written stage plays like Thirisoolam and Jenma Thandanai. In June 2022, Aaroor Dass received the Kalaignar Kalaithurai Vithagar Award from the government of Tamil Nadu.

== Personal life and death ==
Dass married Baby, the couple had four children; three daughters Thara, Aasha and Usha and a son Ravichandran. He lived in Nathamuni Street in T. Nagar in Chennai.

Dass died in Chennai on 20 November 2022, at the age of 91.

== Filmography ==
=== As writer ===
Year	Movie	Note	Ref(s)
1954	Naattiya Thara		
1957	Sathiyavan Savithri		
1957	Nala Damayanthi	Tamil dubbed version only	
1958	Zimbo	Dubbed version of Hindi film of same name	
1959	Vaazha Vaitha Deivam		
1960	Uthami Petra Rathinam		
1961	Pasamalar		
1961	Kongunattu Thangam		
1961	Thaai Sollai Thattadhe		
1962	Kudumba Thalaivan		
1962	Paarthaal Pasi Theerum		
1962	Padithal Mattum Podhuma		
1962	Thayai Katha Thanayan		
1963	Annai Illam		
1963	Needhikkuppin Paasam		
1963	Paar Magale Paar		
1963	Parisu		
1964	Thozhilali		
1964	Puthiya Paravai		
1964	Vettaikaaran		
1965	Aasai Mugam		
1965	Idhaya Kamalam		
1965	Kaakum Karangal		
1965	Kaattu Rani		
1965	Thazhampoo		
1966	Anbe Vaa		
1966	Petralthan Pillaiya		
1966	Thaali Bhagyam		
1966	Thanipiravi		
1967	Iru Malargal		
1967	Thaikku Thalaimagan		
1967	Thangai		
1969	Akka Thangai		
1969	Anbalippu	dialogues	
1969	Deiva Magan		
1971	Praptham		
1974	Panathukkaga		
1976	Ore Thanthai	dialogues	
1976	Bhadrakali		
1977	Avan Oru Sarithiram		
1978	Vanakkatukuriya Kathaliye		
1979	Naan Vazhavaippen		
1979	Pattakathi Bhairavan		
1983	Sumangali		
1984	Niraparaadhi		
1984	Osai		
1984	Unnai Naan Santhithen		
1984	Vidhi		
1984	My Dear Kuttichathan	Dubbed version of Malayalam film My Dear Kuttichathan	
1985	Bandham		
1985	Mangamma Sapatham		
1985	Poo Ondru Puyalaanathu	Dubbed version of Telugu film Pratighatana	
1986	Marumagal		
1986	Viduthalai		
1987	Anbulla Appa		
1987	Vairagyam		
1987	Kudumbam Oru Koyil		
1989	Idhu Dhanda Police	Dubbed version of Telugu film Ankusam	
1989	Mannikka Vendugiren	Dubbed version of Telugu film Yamapaasam	
1990	Vyjayanthi IPS	Dubbed version of Telugu film Karthavyam	
1992	Asokan	Dubbed version of Malayalam film Yoddha	
1993	Evana Irundha Enakenna	Dubbed version of Telugu film Aagraham	
1993	Surya	Dubbed version of Telugu film Nippu Ravva	
1994	Watchman Vadivelu		
1994	Hero		
1995	The King	Dubbed version of Malayalam film The King	
1996	Kutty Sippaigal	dubbed version of Telugu film Little Soldiers	
2001	Pappa	Dubbed version of Telugu film Devi Putrudu	
2004	Anbu Sagothiran	Dubbed version of Telugu film Puttintiki Raa Chelli	
2014	Tenaliraman		

=== As director ===
Year	Title	Notes
1967	Penn Endral Penn	
