= Kongunattu Thangam =

- Theatrical release poster
- Directed by: M. A. Thirumugam
- Written by: Aaroor Dass
- Produced by: Sandow M. M. A. Chinnappa Thevar
- Starring: C. L. Anandan; M. R. Radha; Pushpalatha
- Cinematography: C. V. Moorthi
- Music by: K. V. Mahadevan
- Production company: Devar Films
- Release date: 14 April 1961
- Country: India
- Language: Tamil

Kongunattu Thangam (transl. Thangam of Kongu country) is a 1961 Indian Tamil-language action adventure film directed by M. A. Thirumugam and produced by Sandow M. M. A. Chinnappa Thevar. The film stars M. R. Radha, C. L. Anandan and Pushpalatha. It was released on 14 April 1961.

== Plot ==
Kongunattu Thangam is the story of a young woman named Thangam and her boy friend Rajavel rescuing Muthurathina Boopathy, Zamindar of Kongu Naadu, from the clutches of his concubine Amutha and uniting the Zamindar with his wife.

== Cast ==
Male cast

- M. R. Radha
- C. L. Anandan
- Sandow M. M. A. Chinnappa Thevar
- Kuladeivam Rajagopal

Female cast

- Pushpalatha
- Pandari Bai
- Tambaram Lalitha
- Thilakam R. Rajakumari

Support cast

- Iqbal – Dilip (Horse)
- Benny (Dog)

Dance

- Lakshmirajyam
- Kalaimathi Devi

== Production ==
After producing Thaikkupin Tharam in 1956, there was a misunderstanding between M. G. R. and Devar who were good friends from the very beginning. Devar produced some films without MGR. However, both united in 1961 and Devar produced Thaai Sollai Thattadhe with MGR. Kongunattu Thangam is the last of the series Devar produced without MGR.

Unlike other Tamil films of the day, this film focused on the heroine than on the hero. A remarkable aspect of this film is Devar's use of a horse and a dog almost as main characters in the story. It would appear that the hero and heroine would not have achieved their goal without the help of the horse and the dog.

== Soundtrack ==
Music was composed by K. V. Mahadevan.

Song	Singer/s	Lyricist	Length
"Irundum Illaadhavare"	M. L. Vasanthakumari	A. Maruthakasi	03:25
"Kannaal Idhuvaraiyil Kaanaada"	P. Susheela	A. Maruthakasi	02:18
"Kandadhai Kettadhai Nambaadhe"	Sirkazhi Govindarajan	A. Maruthakasi	03:08
"Nenjinile Enna Veeramirundhum"	Sirkazhi Govindarajan & P. Susheela	A. Maruthakasi	03:51
"Karumbaaga Inikkindra Paruvam"	Sirkazhi Govindarajan & P. Susheela	Kovai Kumaradevan	03:03
"Kandhaa Un Vaasalile"	T. M. Soundararajan & group	Alangudi Somu	03:26
"Unnai Nenaichi Naanirundhen"	A. L. Raghavan & L. R. Eswari	Puratchidasan	03:15
