= Ellam Un Kairasi =

- Theatrical release poster
- Directed by: M. A. Thirumugam
- Written by: M. A. Thirumugam; Ma. Ra (dialogue)
- Starring: Rajinikanth; Seema
- Cinematography: N. S. Varma
- Edited by: S. Natarajan
- Music by: Ilaiyaraaja
- Production company: Santhi Cine Paradise
- Release date: 10 October 1980
- Running time: 131 minutes
- Country: India
- Language: Tamil

Ellam Un Kairasi (transl. All is in your lucky hands) is a 1980 Indian Tamil-language film directed by M. A. Thirumugam and starring Rajinikanth. The film, which began development in 1978, was released on 10 October 1980, and failed at the box office.

== Plot ==
Manikkam is a smuggler and Raja is a mechanic. Incidentally Manikkam is the father of Raja, whom he gets to know only in the climax. Meanwhile, they have many conflicts and fights, which form story of the film.

== Cast ==
- Rajinikanth as Raja
- Seema as Rani
- Major Sundarrajan as Manikkam
- S. A. Ashokan as Rani's father
- Suruli Rajan as Arivazhagan
- Sowcar Janaki as Meenakshi
- Sachu as Tamilarasi
- Shanmugasundaram as Ellappan
- Omakuchi Narasimhan
- Kullamani
- Usilai Mani
- Pakoda Kadhar
- T. K. S. Natarajan

== Soundtrack ==
The music was composed by Ilaiyaraaja.

Title	Lyrics	Singer(s)
"Cherikku Sevai"	Gangai Amaran	S. P. Balasubrahmanyam, S. Janaki, S. P. Sailaja
"Naan Unnai Thirumba Thirumba"	Kannadasan	Jency
"Adi Onkaari Aankaari Maari"	Muthulingam	P Jayachandran

== Critical reception ==
Naagai Dharuman of Anna praised Rajinikanth's acting but criticised his mannerism of his character while also praising the acting of other actors. He also praised the cinematography, music, art and direction and said it can be watched by action lovers.
