= Thayai Katha Thanayan =

- Theatrical release poster
- Directed by: M. A. Thirumugam
- Story by: Aaroor Dass
- Produced by: Sandow M. M. A. Chinnappa Thevar
- Starring: M. G. Ramachandran; M. R. Radha; B. Saroja Devi
- Cinematography: C. V. Murthy
- Edited by: M. A. Thirumugam; M. G. Balu Rao; M. A. Mariappan
- Music by: K. V. Mahadevan
- Production company: Devar Films
- Release date: 13 April 1962
- Running time: 160 minutes
- Country: India
- Language: Tamil

Thayai Katha Thanayan (pronounced [taːjaɪ kaːtta tanaɪjan] transl. The son who protected his mother) is a 1962 Indian Tamil-language film, directed by M. A. Thirumugam and produced by Sandow M. M. A. Chinnappa Thevar. The film stars M. G. Ramachandran, M. R. Radha and B. Saroja Devi. It was released on 13 April 1962.

== Plot ==
Shekar is from an affluent family and Maragadham is from a poor family. Maragadham's brother Kandhan is a tea-stall owner who hates rich people because of an unpleasant past incident. A local goon Muthaiah loves Maragadham and wants to marry her. Neither Maragadham nor Kandhan likes Muthaiah. Shekar once saved Maragadham from Muthaiah, after which Maragadham gets a chance to save Shekar's life when a tiger attacks him during one of his hunting excursions. Both develop a liking towards each other. However, Kandhan's hatred towards the rich comes in the way of their love. Will the two lovers be able to unite or will Kandhan's hatred and Muthaiah's evil intentions win?

== Cast ==
- M. G. Ramachandran as Shekar
- M. R. Radha as Kandhan and Rathinam
- B. Saroja Devi as Maragadham
- P. Kannamba as Shekar's mother
- S. A. Ashokan as Muthaiah
- Sandow M. M. A. Chinnappa Thevar as Mayandi
- G. Sakunthala as Bakkiyam
- M. R. R. Vasu as Sadhasivam

== Soundtrack ==
The music was composed by K. V. Mahadevan, with lyrics by Kannadasan.

Song	Singers	Length
"Kaattu Rani Kottaiyile"	P. Susheela	03:06
"Kaveri Karairukku"	T. M. Soundararajan, P. Susheela	03:23
"Katti Thangam Vetti"	T. M. Soundararajan	03:43
"Moodi Thirantha Imaigal"	T. M. Soundararajan, P. Susheela	02:46
"Nadakkum Enbar"	T. M. Soundararajan	04:10
"Perai Sollalama"	P. Susheela	02:52
"Sandi Kuthirai Nondi Kuthirai"	P. Susheela	02:51

== Reception ==
Kanthan of Kalki criticised the film for lacking newness, and having a Thai Sollai Thattathe hangover, given the nearly identical cast and crew.
