= Thanippiravi =

- Theatrical release poster
- Directed by: M. A. Thirumugam
- Screenplay by: Aaroor Dass
- Story by: Madurai Thirumaran
- Produced by: Sandow M. M. A. Chinnappa Thevar
- Starring: M. G. Ramachandran; Jayalalithaa
- Cinematography: N. S. Varma
- Edited by: M. A. Thirumugam; M. G. Balu Rao
- Music by: K. V. Mahadevan
- Production company: Thevar Films
- Release date: 16 September 1966
- Running time: 145 minutes
- Country: India
- Language: Tamil

Thanippiravi (transl. Exceptional One) is a 1966 Indian Tamil-language film directed by M. A. Thirumugam starring M. G. Ramachandran and Jayalalithaa. The film, produced by Sandow M. M. A. Chinnappa Thevar, was released on 16 September 1966, and was not commercially successful, having run for ten weeks in theatres.

== Cast ==
- M. G. Ramachandran as Muthaiya
- C. L. Anandan as Ravi
- M. N. Nambiar as Sub-inspector Sundaram
- S. A. Ashokan as Rathnapuram
- Nagesh as Chowry
- V. K. Ramasamy as Doreracy
- Athithyan as Singaram
- Tiruchi Soundharajan as Madaswamy
- Sandow M. M. A. Chinnappa Thevar as the boss
- Jayalalithaa as Radha
- Revathi as Sivagami
- Manorama as Gowry
- P. K. Saraswathi as Meenatchi

== Production ==
In the film, Ramachandran's character initially sports a beard and beret, taking inspiration from the Argentine revolutionary Che Guevara.

== Soundtrack ==
The music was composed by K. V. Mahadevan, with lyrics by Kannadasan. The song "Uzhaikkum Kaigale" conveys Ramachandran's leftist beliefs, and highlights "the role of the worker in building society".

Song	Singers	Length
"Ethir Paaramal"	P. Susheela	05:38
"Kannathil Ennadi"	T. M. Soundararajan, P. Susheela	03:36
"Oray Muraithan"	T. M. Soundararajan, P. Susheela	03:09
"Neram Nalla Neram" (Duet)	T. M. Soundararajan, P. Susheela	03:13
"Neram Nalla Neram" (Solo)	T. M. Soundararajan	03:30
"Sirippenna Sirppenna"	P. Susheela	04:33
"Uzhaikkum Kaigale"	T. M. Soundararajan	03:12

== Release and reception ==
Thanippiravi was released on 16 September 1966 in most centres, and on 18 September in Madras (now Chennai). Kalki said the film stood out compared to other Tamil films with regards to action and romance sequences. The film was not commercially successful, having run for ten weeks in theatres. Since Ramachandran and Jayalalithaa appeared as the gods Murugan and Valli in a dream sequence, many of the actors' fans worshipped pictures of the actors in their goddess avatars as if worshipping the actual gods.
