= Penn Deivam =

- Poster
- Directed by: M. A. Thirumugam
- Written by: Aaroor Dass (dialogues)
- Screenplay by: Sandow M. M. A. Chinnappa Thevar
- Story by: A. Abdul Mutthaleef
- Produced by: Sandow M. M. A. Chinnappa Thevar
- Starring: Jaishankar; Padmini; Lakshmi; R. Muthuraman
- Cinematography: P. Bhaskar Rao
- Edited by: M. A. Thirumugam; M. G. Balu Rao
- Music by: V. Kumar
- Production company: Dhandayuthapani Films
- Release date: 22 January 1970
- Country: India
- Language: Tamil

Penn Deivam (transl. Divine Woman) is a 1970 Indian Tamil-language drama film, directed by M. A. Thirumugam and produced by Sandow M. M. A. Chinnappa Thevar. The film stars Jaishankar, Padmini, Lakshmi, R. Muthuraman and Major Sundarrajan. It was released on 22 January 1970.

== Cast ==
- Jaishankar as Police Inspector
- Padmini as Ponnamma
- Lakshmi as Lakshmi
- R. Muthuraman as Muthuraman
- Nagesh
- V. S. Raghavan
- Sachu
- Udaya Chandrika
- K. R. Indira Devi
- Thengai Srinivasan
- Major Sundarrajan as Ponnamma's husband
- Baby Sridevi as young Lakshmi
- Baby Sumathi as child Lakshmi
- Baby Bhanu as newly born Lakshmi

== Soundtrack ==
The music was composed by V. Kumar.

Song	Singers	Lyrics
"Thaai Oru Pakkam"	P. Susheela	Kannadasan
"Udhatile Enakku Oru Macham"	L. R. Eswari	Kannadasan
"Oru Veedu Venduma"	T. M. Soundararajan, P. Susheela	Kannadasan
"Vetkkam Kollalama"	T. M. Soundararajan, P. Susheela	Alangudi Somu
