= Magaraasi =

- Poster
- Directed by: M. A. Thirumugam
- Screenplay by: Aaroor Dass (dialogues)
- Produced by: Sandow M. M. A. Chinnappa Thevar
- Starring: Jayalalithaa; Ravichandran
- Music by: Shankar–Ganesh
- Production company: Dhandayuthapani Films
- Release date: 14 April 1967
- Country: India
- Language: Tamil

Magaraasi (transl. Blessed Girl) is a 1967 Indian Tamil-language film directed by M. A. Thirumugam, starring Jayalalithaa and Ravichandran. It is noted for being the debut film of the music composer duo Shankar–Ganesh. The film was released on 14 April 1967.

== Cast ==
- Jayalalithaa
- Ravichandran
- Nagesh

== Production ==
The film was launched at Vijaya Vauhini Studios with B. Nagireddy switching on the camera. On the day of the launch, a duet was picturised on Ravichandran and Jayalalitha.

== Soundtrack ==
The music was composed by Shankar–Ganesh making their debut. It was poet Kannadasan who recommended the name of the duo to the producer Sandow M. M. A. Chinnappa Thevar.

| No. | Title | Singer(s) | Length |
|---|---|---|---|
| 1. | "Aan Thodatha" | P. Susheela |
| 2. | "Vaazhvil Puthu" | T. M. Soundararajan, P. Susheela |
| 3. | "Aalai Parthal" | T. M. Soundararajan, P. Susheela, Tharapuram Sundarrajan |
| 4. | "Oho Thottu" | P. Susheela |
| 5. | "Pesi Pesiye" | T. M. Soundararajan, P. Susheela |
| 6. | "Machanai Paarthu Vittu" | T. M. Soundararajan |

== Release and reception ==
Magaraasi was released during 14 April 1967, during Puthandu. The film faced competition from Pattanathil Bhootham, released on the same day, and failed at the box-office. Kalki appreciated Nagesh's comedy, saying they give life to the film, but criticised the music and writing.
