= Akka Thangai =

- Poster
- Directed by: M. A. Thirumugam
- Written by: Aaroor Dass (dialogues)
- Screenplay by: Sandow M. M. A. Chinnappa Thevar
- Story by: Poovai Krishnan
- Produced by: Sandow M. M. A. Chinnappa Thevar
- Starring: Jaishankar; K. R. Vijaya; Sowcar Janaki
- Cinematography: H. S. Venu
- Edited by: M. A. Thirumugam; M. G. Balu Rao
- Music by: Shankar–Ganesh
- Production company: Dhandayudhapani Films
- Release date: 28 February 1969
- Running time: 141 minutes
- Country: India
- Language: Tamil

Akka Thangai (transl. Elder and Younger Sister) is a 1969 Indian Tamil-language legal drama film, directed by M. A. Thirumugam and produced and screenplay done by Sandow M. M. A. Chinnappa Thevar. The dialogue was written by Aaroor Dass and the story was written by Poovai Krishnan respectively. Music was by Shankar–Ganesh. It stars Jaishankar, K. R. Vijaya and Sowcar Janaki. The film was released on 28 February 1969. It was remade in Telugu as Akka Chellelu (1970).

== Plot ==
A poor, struggling city-dweller woman named Janaki sacrifices everything to make her younger sister, Vijaya, an advocate. However, fate turns Vijaya against her sister's husband in a murder case.

== Cast ==
- Jaishankar as Shankar
- K. R. Vijaya as Vijaya
- Sowcar Janaki as Janaki
- Major Sundarrajan as Judge Sundaram/Neruppu Kannaiyan
- Nagesh as Raju
- M. Bhanumathi as Bhanumathi
- Pushpamala as Rani
- Prem Anand as Raghavan
- Senthamarai as Janaki and Vijaya's neighbour
- Vellai Subbaiah as Rickshaw owner
- T. K. S. Natarajan as Housekeeper
- Sandow M. M. A. Chinnappa Thevar as Inspector (guest appearance)
- Vijaya Lalitha as Aasha, Neruppu Kannaiyyan's boss
- S. A. Ashokan as public prosecutor(guest appearance)
- Thengai Srinivasan as Kuppusamy (guest appearance)
- K. D. Santhanam as Judge (guest appearance)

== Soundtrack ==
Music was by Shankar–Ganesh.

Song	Singers	Lyricist	Length
"Kuruvikala Ullasa"	T. M. Soundararajan, P. Susheela	A. Maruthakasi	02:27
"Aaduvathu Vetri Mayil"	T. M. Soundararajan, P. Susheela	Kannadasan	03:29
"Maruvathu Society"	L. R. Eswari	Kannadasan	03:21
"Paattodu Raagam Inge"	Seerkazhi Govindarajan	Kannadasan	03:24

== Accolades ==
Akka Thangai won the Tamil Nadu State Film Award for Second Best Film.
