= Neethikkupin Paasam =

1963 film by M. A. Thirumugam

- Theatrical release poster
- Directed by: M. A. Thirumugam
- Story by: Aaroor Dass
- Produced by: Sandow M. M. A. Chinnappa Thevar
- Starring: M. G. Ramachandran; B. Saroja Devi; M. R. Radha
- Cinematography: N. S. Varma
- Edited by: M. A. Thirumugam; M. G. Balu Rao; M. A. Mariappan
- Music by: K. V. Mahadevan
- Production company: Devar Films
- Distributed by: Emgeeyar Pictures
- Release date: 15 August 1963
- Running time: 150 minutes
- Country: India
- Language: Tamil

Neethikkupin Paasam (transl. Law First, Affection Next) is a 1963 Indian Tamil-language legal drama film, directed by M. A. Thirumugam and produced by Sandow M. M. A. Chinnappa Thevar. The film stars M. G. Ramachandran, B. Saroja Devi and M. R. Radha. It was released on 15 August 1963. The film was remade in Telugu as Thandri Kodukula Challenge.

== Plot ==
Gopal is an honest lawyer who prioritizes law and order over family and emotions. He once saved Sivasamy from a false petition filed against him by Muniyandi without charging any fees and being an eyewitness. He meets a simple village girl named Gowri and falls in love with her, which leads him to reject his cousins Jaya and Prema. Jaya commits suicide following his rejection. After this incident, Gopal's father decides that Gopal's marriage will be arranged based on his wishes, but his mother opposes it.

Eventually, Gopal and Gowri get separated but later reunite. However, trouble arises in the form of Muthayya, Gowri's uncle, who sets his sights on her. Gowri's father, Sivasamy, initially accepts Muthayya's proposal but later rejects it upon learning of Gopal and Gowri's relationship. He also informs Gopal's parents about it, with his father accepting and his mother rejecting the relationship. Gopal's mother even goes to Gowri's house and threatens her.

Meanwhile, Muthayya joins forces with Muniyandi, Sivasamy's rival, to get his consent for marrying Gowri. Sivasamy opposes it, and to marry Gowri, Muthayya murders Sivasamy with the help of Muniyandi. Gopal's mother, who is on her way home, is framed for the murder, leading to her arrest by her husband, who also files the case against her.

Gopal's brother, Ramu, takes on the case as a prosecutor due to their father's wishes. Only Gopal stands up for his mother in court and argues against his own father and brother. After several court hearings, Gopal and Gowri discover that Muthayya is the real murderer, with the help of a CID officer who is disguised as a blind beggar. They also discover that Muthayya and Muniyandi are involved in illegal business. With the help of the police, Gopal presents them in court.

After some arguments between Gopal and Ramu, the CID officer provides an eyewitness account. The judge sentences Muthayya and Muniyandi to imprisonment, and orders the release of Gopal's mother. Since they are involved in illegal business, they are punished for that as well. The judge also praises Gopal's family for their commitment to the law and orders and mentions them as the family with a policy of law first, affection next. Finally, the family unites, and Gopal marries Gowri.

== Cast ==
- M. G. Ramachandran as Gopal Chandrasekar
- B. Saroja Devi as Gowri
- M. R. Radha as Sivasamy
- S. V. Ranga Rao as Chandrasekar
- P. Kannamba as Saraswathi
- M. N. Nambiar as Muthaiya
- S. A. Ashokan as Ramu Chandrasekar
- Sandow M. M. A. Chinnappa Thevar as Muniyandi
- Senthamarai as Blind man / Secret agent
- G. Sakunthala as Janaki
- S. M. Thirupathisamy
- B. V. Radha as Jaya
- Sasirekha as Prema

== Soundtrack ==
The music was composed by K. V. Mahadevan, with lyrics by Kannadasan.

Song	Singers	Length
"Akkam Pakkam"	T. M. Soundararajan, P. Susheela	03:29
"Idi Idichu Mazhai"	T. M. Soundararajan, P. Susheela	03:05
"Kaadu Kodutha Kaniyirukku"	P. Susheela	02:54
"Maanallavo Kangal"	T. M. Soundararajan, P. Susheela	03:44
"Sirithalum Pothume"	T. M. Soundararajan, P. Susheela	02:54
"Vaanga Vaanga"	P. Susheela	03:30
"Ponaley"	T. M. Soundararajan	03:50

== Release and reception ==
Neethikkupin Paasam was released on 15 August 1963, and distributed by Emgeeyar Pictures. Kumudam gave the film a negative review, playing on its title by saying "நீதிக்குப் பின் பாசம் பாதிக்குப் பின் மோசம்" (Neethikkupin Paasam is bad in the latter half). Similar comments were made by Kanthan of Kalki. T. M. Ramachandran of Sport and Pastime, however, reviewed the film more positively, praising the performances of Ramachandran and Saroja Devi.
