= Komatha En Kulamatha =

- Title card
- Directed by: M. A. Thirumugam
- Produced by: Sandow M. M. A. Chinnappa Thevar
- Starring: Prameela; Srikanth
- Music by: Shankar–Ganesh
- Production company: Dhandayudhapani Films
- Release date: 27 July 1973
- Running time: 136 minutes
- Country: India
- Language: Tamil

Komatha En Kulamatha (/ɡoʊmɑːθɑː/ or /koʊmɑːθɑː/ transl. Mother cow is our family deity) is a 1973 Indian Tamil-language drama film, directed by M. A. Thirumugam and produced by Sandow M. M. A. Chinnappa Thevar. The film stars Prameela and Srikanth, with a cow in a major role. Thengai Srinivasan, M. Bhanumathi, Nagesh, S. N. Lakshmi, Major Sundarrajan and S. A. Ashokan play supporting roles. It was released on 27 July 1973. The film was remade in Telugu as Palle Paduchu (1974), in Kannada as Seethe Alla Savithri (1973) and in Hindi as Gaai Aur Gori in (1973).

== Cast ==
- Prameela as Vijaya
- Srikanth as Arun
- Nagesh as Ramu
- Thengai Srinivasan as Vasu
- M. Bhanumathi as Mohana
- S. N. Lakshmi as Arun's Mother
- S. A. Ashokan as Sengotan
- Major Sundarrajan as Nattamai
- V. Gopalakrishnan as Soma Sundaram
- Baby Sumathi as Valli
- Cow as Lakshmi
- Dog as Tommy

== Soundtrack ==
Music was composed by Shankar–Ganesh. P. Susheela is the only playback singer in the soundtrack.

Songs	Singers	Length
"Anbu Deivam Nee"	P. Susheela	03:26
"Pozhuthukku Munne"	P. Susheela	04:07
"Dirty Dance"	Instrumental	01:44
"Manakolam Parkka Vanthen"	P. Susheela	03:25
"Varuga Varuga Thalaivaa"	P. Susheela	03:35

== Critical reception ==
Navamani appreciated the performances of Srikanth, Prameela and the cow Lakshmi, adding that the film was better titled "Vaa" (come) Matha rather than "Go" Matha.
