= Thai Meethu Sathiyam =

1978 film directed by R. Thyagarajan

- Theatrical release poster
- Directed by: R. Thyagarajan
- Story by: Sandow M. M. A. Chinnappa Thevar
- Produced by: Sandow M. M. A. Chinnappa Thevar
- Starring: Rajinikanth; Sripriya
- Cinematography: V. Ramamurthy
- Edited by: M. G. Balu Rao
- Music by: Shankar–Ganesh
- Production company: Dhandayuthapani Films
- Release date: 30 October 1978
- Running time: 137 minutes
- Country: India
- Language: Tamil

Thai Meethu Sathiyam (transl. I swear upon my mother) is a 1978 Indian Tamil-language curry Western film directed by R. Thyagarajan and produced by Sandow M. M. A. Chinnappa Thevar. The film stars Rajinikanth and Sripriya, with Mohan Babu, Prabhakar, Suruli Rajan, Sundararajan, A. V. M. Rajan, S. A. Ashokan, Nagesh, Ambareesh, Jayamalini and Sukumari in supporting roles. It focuses on a shepherd who vows to avenge his parents by killing the murderers.

The film was originally planned by Thevar in the late 1960s under the title Marupiravi (transl. Rebirth) with M. G. Ramachandran intended to star; however, due to Ramachandran's health and legal issues, the film was shelved. Thevar later revived the project as Thai Meethu Sathiyam, with Rajinikanth cast in the lead role as Ramachandran had retired from acting by then. It was the last film produced by Thevar to be released.

Thai Meethu Sathiyam was released on 30 October 1978, a month after Thevar's death. The film became a commercial success, running for over 100 days in theatres.

== Plot ==
Babu is a shepherd with a dog named Ramu. When criminals Balu and Johnny murder his parents, he swears upon his mother that he will take revenge. Babu trains under the local zamindar, and is revealed to be naturally skilled at marksmanship. After dressing himself like a cowboy, equipping himself with the zamindar's guns and a horse, and with Ramu as his aide, he fulfils his promise by killing the criminals.

== Cast ==
- Rajinikanth as Babu
- Sripriya as Sivakami
- Mohan Babu as Johnny
- Prabhakar as Balu
- Suruli Rajan as Somanathan
- Sundararajan as Johnny's father
- A. V. M. Rajan as Kandhaswamy
- S. A. Ashokan
- Nagesh
- Ambareesh as the zamindar
- Jayamalini
- Sukumari as Babu's mother

== Production ==
In the late 1960s, Sandow M. M. A. Chinnappa Thevar had planned to produce a film starring M. G. Ramachandran, titled Marupiravi; however, as Ramachandran was unwell at that time, as well as involved in a legal case, resulting in the film being shelved. Thevar later revived the film in the late 1970s with a new title, Thai Meethu Sathiyam, but as Ramachandran had retired from acting after becoming the Chief Minister of Tamil Nadu, Rajinikanth was instead cast. The film, directed by R. Thyagarajan, was Rajinikanth's first film in the Western genre, and the plot took inspiration from several Curry Westerns starring Jaishankar. It was the last film produced by Thevar to be released; he died on 8 September when the film was still in production. Cinematography was handled by V. Ramamurthy and editing by M. G. Balu Rao.

== Themes ==
Thai Meethu Sathiyam deals with one of the most recurrent themes in Tamil cinema: revenge. Like most Thyagarajan films, this has an animal playing a prominent character. The Economic Times likened the relationship between Babu and his dog Ramu to that of Wallace and Gromit.

== Soundtrack ==
The soundtrack was composed by the duo Shankar–Ganesh.

Track listing
No.	Title	Lyrics	Singer(s)	Length
1.	"Neram Vandhachu"	Mara	P. Susheela, T. M. Soundararajan	3:55
2.	"Sathiyathin Thathuvathai"	Barani	T. M. Soundararajan	3:51
3.	"Babu Babu Enge"	Barani	P. Susheela	3:22
4.	"Uravum Undu"	Barani	P. Susheela	3:56
Total length:				15:04

== Release and reception ==
Thai Meethu Sathiyam was released on 30 October 1978, Diwali day. Ananda Vikatan rated the film 44 out of 100. Anna praised the performances of cast, cinematography, music, direction, stunts and called it a usual formula narrated in an interesting manner. Despite facing competition from many other Diwali releases, the film became a commercial success, running for over 100 days in theatres, and Rajinikanth "carved out for himself a niche in vendetta roles".

== Bibliography ==
- Ramachandran, Naman (2014) [2012]. Rajinikanth: The Definitive Biography. New Delhi: Penguin Books. ISBN 978-0-14-342111-5.
