= Ram Lakshman (film) =

- Theatrical release poster
- Directed by: R. Thyagarajan
- Story by: Devar Films Story Department
- Produced by: C. Dhandayuthapani
- Starring: Kamal Haasan; Sripriya
- Cinematography: V. Ramamoorthy
- Edited by: M. G. Balurao
- Music by: Ilaiyaraaja
- Production company: Devar Films
- Release date: 28 February 1981
- Country: India
- Language: Tamil

Ram Lakshman is a 1981 Indian Tamil-language film directed by R. Thyagarajan. The film stars Kamal Haasan and Sripriya. It was released on 28 February 1981, and remade in Telugu as Rama Lakshmanulu the same year.

== Plot ==
Ram and his pet elephant Lakshman have grown up together and are emotionally very attached to one another. They share such a strong bond that Ram refuses to marry his sweetheart Meena when her father refuses to sanction their marriage unless Ram leaves Lakshman. A employee of Meena's father kills him and implicates Ram and Lakshman for the murder.

== Cast ==
- Kamal Haasan as Ram
- Sripriya as Meena
- M. N. Nambiar as Chandrasekar
- Pandari Bai as Meenakshi (guest appearance)
- Asokan as Paranthaman
- Raveendran as Raja
- Sivachandran as Kumar
- Suruli Rajan
- Thengai Srinivasan
- Major Sundarrajan
- V. Gopalakrishnan

== Production ==
Like Devar Films' previous ventures, this film features an animal in a prominent role, in this case an elephant. Filming took place at Ooty.

== Soundtrack ==
The soundtrack was composed by Ilaiyaraaja. The song "Nandhaan Ungappanda" was selected to be played at the opening ceremony of the London 2012 Olympics.

Track listing
No.	Title	Lyrics	Singer(s)	Length
1.	"Nandhaan Ungappanda"	Vaali	S. P. Balasubrahmanyam
2.	"Nadakkattum"	Vaali	S. P. Balasubrahmanyam
3.	"Valibame Va"	Vairamuthu	S. P. Balasubrahmanyam, S. P. Sailaja
4.	"Vizhiyil En Vizhiyil"	Vaali	S. P. Balasubrahmanyam, P. Susheela
5.	"Onnan Onu"	Vaali	S. P. Balasubrahmanyam, Malaysia Vasudevan

== Reception ==
Nalini Sastry of Kalki felt Kamal Haasan's attempts at comedy failed and the film and story lacked something but praised Ilaiyaraaja's music and climax fight.
