= Dharmam Thalai Kaakkum =

1963 film directed by M. A. Thirumugam

- Theatrical release poster
- Directed by: M. A. Thirumugam
- Written by: Sa. Ayyapillai
- Produced by: Sandow M. M. A. Chinnappa Thevar
- Starring: M. G. Ramachandran; B. Saroja Devi; M. R. Radha; S. A. Ashokan
- Cinematography: N. S. Varma
- Edited by: M. A. Thirumugam; M. G. Balu Rao; M. A. Mariappan
- Music by: K. V. Mahadevan
- Production company: Devar Films
- Distributed by: Emgeeyaar Pictures
- Release date: 22 February 1963
- Running time: 127 minutes
- Country: India
- Language: Tamil

Dharmam Thalai Kaakkum (transl. Dharma will save your life) is a 1963 Indian Tamil-language thriller film directed by M. A. Thirumugam and produced by Sandow M. M. A. Chinnappa Thevar. The film stars M. G. Ramachandran, B. Saroja Devi, M. R. Radha and S. A. Ashokan. It was released on 22 February 1963 and ran for more than 100 days in theatres.

== Plot ==
Masked killers surrounded a guy and were killing him, Doctor Chandran, was passing by, he gets into fight with those people and hurried to the police station, meanwhile the killers escaped with the body. Chandran joins hands with police to investigate the crime. Chandran is very generous guy, serving the poor. On another side, Mani was appointed as a cashier at Kandhasamy's finance company. Another attack by masked killers occurred when Sadhanandham and Kandhasamy were getting into the car with money. Chandran helped them out and he identified the person in the plot. Mani is staging a drama to get money of Sadhanandham.

Meanwhile, Chandran falls in love with Sivagami, Sadhanandham's daughter. But Sadhanandham arranges the marriage for Sivagami and Mani. Sivagami refused to marry Mani. Things get tight around the neck of Sadhanandham when Chandran and Sivagami's mother goes to the police. Sadhanandham accepts Chandran and Sivagami's love. At the climax, Chandran and the cops play a drama to find the masked killer. Will the killer's mask tear? Will Sivagmi and Chandran get married? The remaining story will answer these questions.

== Cast ==
- M. G. Ramachandran as Chandran
- B. Saroja Devi as Sivakami
- M. R. Radha as Sadanandam
- S. A. Ashokan as Mani
- V. K. Ramasamy as Kandhasamy
- Sandow M. M. A. Chinnappa Thevar as Mayandi
- M. V. Rajamma as Sadanandam's wife
- Gemini Balu
- Gemini Chandra as Malliga

== Soundtrack ==
The music was composed by K. V. Mahadevan, with lyrics by Kannadasan. The song "Thottuvida" was remixed by Mani Sharma for the film Gaja (2008).

Song	Singers	Length
"Azhagana Vazhai"	P. Susheela	3:59
"Dharmam Thalai Kaakkum"	T. M. Soundararajan	3:52
"Hello Hello Sugama"	T. M. Soundararajan, P. Susheela	3:17
"Moodu Pani Kulireduththu"	T. M. Soundararajan, P. Susheela	3:30
"Oruvan Manathu"	T. M. Soundararajan	3:22
"Paravaigale"	P. Susheela	3:10
"Thottuvida"	T. M. Soundararajan, P. Susheela	3:50

== Release and reception ==
Dharmam Thalai Kaakkum was released on 22 February 1963, and distributed by Emgeeyaar Pictures. On 1 March 1963, The Indian Express wrote, "Though the plot is routine, the acting, especially by M. G. Ramachandran, rescues the film from its banality. As a doctor, [Ramachandran] does a very sincere work and provides most of the interesting moments the picture has." Kanthan of Kalki, however, criticised the story for lack of freshness. The film was one of the most successful Tamil films of the year, and ran for more than 100 days in theatres.
