= Penn Endral Penn =

- Poster
- Directed by: Aaroor Dass
- Written by: Aaroor Dass
- Produced by: A. L. Srinivasan
- Starring: Gemini Ganesan; C. R. Vijayakumari; B. Saroja Devi
- Cinematography: T. S. Rangasamy
- Edited by: R. Devarajan
- Music by: M. S. Viswanathan
- Production company: ALS Productions
- Release date: 7 December 1967
- Country: India
- Language: Tamil

Penn Endral Penn (transl. A woman is a woman) is a 1967 Indian Tamil-language film written and directed by Aaroor Dass, in his only directorial credit. The film stars Gemini Ganesan, C. R. Vijayakumari and B. Saroja Devi. It was released on 7 December 1967, and failed at the box office.

== Cast ==
- Gemini Ganesan as Babu
- C. R. Vijayakumari
- B. Saroja Devi as Usha
- S. A. Ashokan
- V. K. Ramasamy
- K. A. Thangavelu
- Cho
- A. Karunanidhi
- Pandari Bai
- M. Saroja
- B. V. Radha
- Baby Raji

== Production ==
Penn Endral Penn is the directorial debut of Aaroor Dass. M. G. Ramachandran cautioned him against turning director, but Dass refused to listen. Saroja Devi, who had taken a hiatus from acting after marriage, sought a re-entry into film and asked producer A. L. Srinivasan to star in this film.

== Soundtrack ==
The music was composed by M. S. Viswanathan, with lyrics by Kannadasan.

Track listing
No.	Title	Singer(s)	Length
1.	"Penn Endral Penn"	M. S. Viswanathan
2.	"Sirikkum Ulagil"	P. Susheela
3.	"Sirithalum Kanneer"	T. M. Soundararajan, P. Susheela
4.	"Thedi Thedi Kathirunthen"	P. Susheela
5.	"Un Kannukku Naan"	T. M. Soundararajan, P. Susheela

== Release and reception ==
Penn Endral Penn was released on 7 December 1967. Kalki appreciated the performances of Saroja Devi and Vijayakumari, but criticised the music by Viswanathan. The film became a box office failure, and Dass never directed any other film afterwards.
