= Kadhal Vaaganam =

- Theatrical release poster
- Directed by: M. A. Thirumugam
- Written by: T. N. Balu
- Produced by: Sandow M. M. A. Chinnappa Thevar
- Starring: M. G. Ramachandran; J. Jayalalithaa
- Cinematography: N. S. Varma
- Edited by: M. A. Thirumugam
- Music by: K. V. Mahadevan
- Production company: Devar Films
- Release date: 21 October 1968
- Country: India
- Language: Tamil

Kadhal Vaaganam (transl. Vehicle of love) is a 1968 Indian Tamil-language film directed by M. A. Thirumugam. The film stars M. G. Ramachandran, J. Jayalalithaa and S. A. Ashokan. It was released on 21 October 1968, Diwali day.

== Plot ==
The film revolves around an international smuggling network operating between Kuala Lumpur and Madras. At the center of the conflict is a high-tech caravan, which hidden illicit goods have transformed into a highly sought-after target of criminal greed.

Sundaram finds himself entangled in the conspiracy alongside Vanitha. Together, they must navigate threats from a syndicate led by The Chief and his ruthless accomplice, Marimuthu. Assisted by his friend Chellappin, Sundaram sets out to foil the smugglers, protect Vanitha, and bring the criminal enterprise to justice.

== Cast ==
Male cast

- M. G. Ramachandran as Sundaram
- Nagesh as Chellappin
- R. S. Manohar as Kala's husband
- S. A. Ashokan as Marimuthu
- Major Sundarrajan as Pandjachalam
- O. A. K. Thevar as The chief
- Typist Gopu as
- Sandow M. M. A. Chinnappa Thevar as a goon

Female cast

- J. Jayalalithaa as Vanitha
- Vijaya Lalitha as Fancy
- Manorama as Kokila
- C. K. Saraswathi as Mangalam
- Seethalakshmi as Kala's mother
- Chandrakantha (Guest-star)
- R Vasanthkumar as Family Doctor

== Production ==
Ramachandran dressed in drag for filming the song "Enna Man Ponnu Naan". His costume was designed by M. A. Muthu.

== Soundtrack ==
The music was composed by K. V. Mahadevan.

No.	Title	Singer(s)	Length
1.	"Enna Man Ponnu Naan"	L. R. Eswari
2.	"Vaa Ponnukku Pottu"	P. Susheela, T. M. Soundararajan
3.	"Adakku Manathai"	T. M. Soundararajan
4.	"Ingey Vaa"	P. Susheela, P. B. Sreenivas
5.	"Vanakkam"	P. Susheela
