= Kaattu Rani (1965 film) =

- Theatrical release poster
- Directed by: M. A. Thirumugam
- Screenplay by: (Dialogues) Aaroor Dass
- Story by: Sandow M. M. A. Chinnappa Thevar
- Produced by: Sandow M. M. A. Chinnappa Thevar
- Starring: S. A. Ashokan; K. Balaji; K. R. Vijaya; Sheela
- Cinematography: N. S. Varma
- Edited by: M. A. Thirumugam; M. G. Balu Rao
- Music by: P. S. Diwakar
- Production company: Dhandayuthapani Films
- Release date: 4 February 1965
- Running time: 160 minutes
- Country: India
- Language: Tamil

Kaattu Rani (transl. The queen of the jungle) is a 1965 Indian Tamil-language film produced by Sandow M. M. A. Chinnappa Thevar via Dhandayuthapani Films and directed by M. A. Thirumugam. The film stars S. A. Ashokan, K. Balaji, K. R. Vijaya and Sheela. It was released on 4 February 1965.

== Cast ==
The following lists are compiled from the database of Film News Anandan and from the film credits

- S. A. Ashokan
- K. Balaji
- V. K. Ramasamy
- R. S. Manohar
- S. V. Ramdas
- Sandow M. M. A. Chinnappa Thevar
- Gemini Balu
- "En Thangai" T. S. Natarajan
- K. R. Vijaya
- Sheela
- M. Kannan
- S. S. Natarajan
- Gopuraj
- S. P. Nagarajan
- "Nellai" Rajan
- G. Krishnasamy
- Justin
- Shankar
- Marthandan
- S. A. Azhakesan

== Production ==
Sandow M. M. A. Chinnappa Thevar was producing films under Devar Films starring M. G. Ramachandran and K. V. Mahadevan composing the music. He floated Dhandayuthapani Films to produce films with a different team. This was one such production under the new banner.

== Soundtrack ==
Music was composed by P. S. Diwakar and the lyrics were penned by Kannadasan, assisted by Panchu Arunachalam and Rama Muthaiah.

Song	Singer/s	Length
"Moongil Ilai Maele, Thoongum Pani Neere"	P. Susheela	03:17
"Sollaadha Kadhai Onru Sonnaanadi"	P. Susheela	03:45
"Kaattu Raani, Mugathai Kaattu Raani"	T. M. Soundararajan, P. Susheela	03:36
"Othaiyadi Paadhaiyile Oruthi Manam Pogaiyile"	T. M. Soundararajan, P. Susheela	03:30

== Release and reception ==
Kaattu Rani was released on 4 February 1965. Writing for Sport and Pastime, T. M. Ramachandran called the film "a poor imitation of Hatari" and criticised Thirumugam's direction. The Indian Express called it "old Sandow Chinnappa Devar and his jungle felines box office formula" and added, "Someone said this is a mass film and not for the discerning few; so let us leave it at that". The film grossed ₹157,398 (US$1,900); after paying ₹77,585 (US$920) as entertainment tax, it sustained a loss of ₹13,982 (US$170).
