= Muharasi =

1966 film by M. A. Thirumugam

- Theatrical release poster
- Directed by: M. A. Thirumugam
- Story by: G. Balasubramaniam
- Produced by: Sandow M. M. A. Chinnappa Thevar
- Starring: M. G. Ramachandran; Gemini Ganesan; Jayalalitha; Jayanthi
- Cinematography: N. S. Varma
- Edited by: M. A. Thirumugam; M. G. Balu Rao
- Music by: K. V. Mahadevan
- Production company: Thevar Films
- Distributed by: Emgeeyar Pictures
- Release date: 18 February 1966
- Running time: 145 minutes
- Country: India
- Language: Tamil

Muharasi (/muhərɑːsi/ transl. Luck of Face) is a 1966 Indian Tamil-language film, directed by M. A. Thirumugam. Based on G. Balasubramaniam's play Moondrezhuthil En Moochirukkum, itself inspired by the 1964 film The Pitiless Three, the film stars M. G. Ramachandran and Gemini Ganesan in their only film together. The film, produced by Sandow M. M. A. Chinnappa Thevar under his Thevar Films banner, was released on 18 February 1966 and ran for 100 days.

== Plot ==
Because she refused to cooperate, Mangalam, a fair mother, pays with her life. She is cruelly stabbed by Duraiswamy, a notable, who put himself up to spirit away the colossal fortune of his deceased brother. He acts so meanly in front of little Somu, (Mangalam's elder son), the terrorised child who memorises the face of Duraiswamy.

15 years later, Somu is living only for one thing: to take revenge. He settled in his purpose of finding the murderer and killing him with his own hands. His young brother Ramu, a police officer of a formidable efficiency, big in integrity and whose reputation precedes him, is moved into the same direction as Duraiswamy!

Ramu is in love with Jaya, who turns out to be one of the two girls of Duraiswamy, the criminal whom Somu has looked for desperately for years. Ramu tried vainly to tear away from his older brother Somu, the truth on the identity of the murderer of their mother. It is there that their opinion on justice diverges. Somu wants death, whereas Ramu demands a judgment (sentence) in front of a court for the murderer of their mother!

== Cast ==
Lead actors

- M. G. Ramachandran as Assistant Commissioner of Police Ramu
- Gemini Ganesan as Somu

Male supporting actors

- M. N. Nambiar as Duraisamy
- S. A. Ashokan as Jambhu
- Nagesh as Police Constable 501
- V. K. Ramasamy as Senior Police Constable 777, Singaram
- Sriram as A good-for-nothing corrected by Ramu
- Sandow M. M. A. Chinnappa Thevar as Sangili

Lead actresses

- Jayalalitha as Jaya
- Jayanthi as Malliga

Supporting actresses

- Manorama as Alangaram (Thandhaiyar Paithai)
- P. K. Saraswathi as Meenatchi

== Production ==
Muharasi, adapted from G. Balasubramaniam's play Moondrezhuthil En Moochirukkum, itself inspired by the 1964 film The Pitiless Three, was the only film where M. G. Ramachandran and Gemini Ganesan acted together. Though actors like S. A. Ashokan, K. Balaji or M. G. Chakrapani were considered, Ramachandran chose Ganesan. Filming was completed within 18 days.

== Soundtrack ==
The music was composed by K. V. Mahadevan, with lyrics by Kannadasan.

Song	Singers	Length
"Thanner"	P. Susheela	02:59
"Enakkum Unakkumtham"	T. M. Soundararajan, P. Susheela	03:44
"Undaakki Vittavargal"	T. M. Soundararajan	04:19
"Enna Enna"	T. M. Soundararajan, P. Susheela	03:16
"Mugathai Kaatti"	T. M. Soundararajan, P. Susheela	03:05

== Release and reception ==
Muharasi was released on 18 February 1966, and distributed by Emgeeyar Pictures. Writing for Sport and Pastime, T. M. Ramachandran gave a negative review citing "There is nothing much to write home about the direction by M. A. Thirumugam". He said M. G. Ramachandran gave a "consummate performance" while Ganesan was "almost an unsympathetic role [..] he tends to overdo" and Jayalalithaa "tries hard to make presence felt". Kalki said Nambiar's performance lacked newness, and none of the songs were memorable.
