= Gaai Aur Gori =

- Film poster
- Directed by: M. A. Thirumugam
- Written by: Inder Raj Anand
- Story by: Sandow M. M. A. Chinnappa Devar
- Produced by: Sandow M. M. A. Chinnappa Devar
- Starring: Shatrughan Sinha; Jaya Bachchan; Bindu
- Cinematography: S. V. Venkatarathnam
- Edited by: M. A. Thirumugham
- Music by: Laxmikant–Pyarelal
- Production company: Dhandayuthapani Films
- Release date: 20 April 1973
- Running time: 151 minutes
- Country: India
- Language: Hindi

Gaai Aur Gori (transl. Cow and girl) is a 1973 Indian Hindi-language drama film directed by M. A. Thirumugam. It is a remake of the Tamil film Komatha En Kulamatha.

== Plot ==
The film shows the stories of a girl named Vijaya who has a pet cow, Lakhsmi and how she faces the turmoils of her life after marriage.

== Cast ==
- Shatrughan Sinha as Arun
- Jaya Bachchan as Vijaya
- Bindu as Mohini
- Sulochana Latkar as Arun's Mother
- Manmohan as Mohini's Brother

== Music ==
Laxmikant–Pyarelal have composed the music and lyrics by Anand Bakshi.

Song	Singer
"Gori O Gori Prem Karle"	Kishore Kumar
"Champa Chameli"	Lata Mangeshkar
"Sabse Achhi Maa"	Lata Mangeshkar
"Raja Meri Matki Ko"	Asha Bhosle
"Main Teri Nigahon Se"	Asha Bhosle
