= Yanai Paagan =

- Theatrical release poster
- Directed by: M. A. Thirumugam
- Screenplay by: Ayyapillai
- Produced by: Sandow M. M. A. Chinnappa Thevar
- Starring: Udaykumar; B. Saroja Devi; P. S. Veerappa; Manorama; Sandow M. M. A. Chinnappa Thevar
- Cinematography: C. V. Moorthi
- Edited by: M. A. Thirumugam, Mariappan, Balu Rao
- Music by: K. V. Mahadevan
- Production company: Devar Films
- Release date: 19 October 1960
- Running time: 166 minutes
- Country: India
- Language: Tamil

Yaanai Paagan (transl. Mahout) is a 1960 Indian Tamil-language adventure film directed by M. A. Thirumugam. The film stars Udaykumar and B. Saroja Devi. It was released on 19 October 1960.

== Cast ==
- Udaykumar as Shankar
- B. Saroja Devi
- P. S. Veerappa
- Manorama as Valli
- Jayanthi
- S. V. Subbaiah
- S. D. Subbulakshmi
- V. R. Rajagopal as Skandan
- Sandow M. M. A. Chinnappa Thevar

== Dubbed versions ==
The film was dubbed into Telugu and released in 1961 as Evaru Donga and into Hindi, also released in 1961, as Mahavat.

== Soundtrack ==
The music was composed by K. V. Mahadevan while the lyrics were penned by A. Maruthakasi, Kovai Kumaradevan, Puratchidasan and Alangudi Somu.

Song	Singer/s	Lyricist	Length
"Aambalaikku Pombala Avasiyandhaan"	A. L. Raghavan & L. R. Eswari	Alangudi Somu	03:26
"Sengani Vaai Thirandhu Sirithiduvai"	Sirkazhi S. Govindarajan & P. Susheela	Puratchidasan	06:11
"Paadupatta Thozhilaali Pasikudhendraan"	P. Leela & group	Puratchidasan	02:42
"Pandhiyile Mattum Munne"	A. L. Raghavan, L. R. Eswari & group	A. Maruthakasi	06:34
"Nenjinile Inbam Konjiduthe"	P. Susheela	A. Maruthakasi	02:53
"Thulli Vizhum Aruviyai Pol"	T. M. Soundararajan & P. Susheela	A. Maruthakasi	03:43
"Yaarukku Anjaame Kaariyathai"	K. Jamuna Rani	A. Maruthakasi	02:27
"Padhinaarum Niraiyaadha"	T. M. Soundararajan	Kovai Kumaradevan	03:29
"Uyarvu Thaazhvu Illaamale"	P. Susheela & group	Kovai Kumaradevan	03:46

== Reception ==
The Sunday Standard appreciated the locations, cinematography and performances of the cast.
