= Vaazha Vaitha Deivam =

- Theatrical release poster
- Directed by: M. A. Thirumugam
- Written by: Aaroor Dass
- Produced by: Sandow M. M. A. Chinnappa Thevar
- Starring: Gemini Ganesan; B. Saroja Devi
- Cinematography: C. V. Moorthy
- Edited by: M. A. Thirumugam; M. G. Balu Rao; M. A. Mariyappan
- Music by: K. V. Mahadevan
- Production company: Thevar Films
- Release date: 28 August 1959
- Running time: 141 minutes
- Country: India
- Language: Tamil

Vaazha Vaitha Deivam (transl. The god who gave life) is 1959 Indian Tamil-language romantic drama film, directed by M. A. Thirumugam, produced by Sandow M. M. A. Chinnappa Thevar and written by Aaroor Dass with music by K. V. Mahadevan. It stars Gemini Ganesan and B. Saroja Devi, with T. S. Balaiah, V. K. Ramasamy, S. V. Subbaiah, P. Kannamba and T. P. Muthulakshmi in supporting roles. The film was released on 28 August 1959 and emerged as a box office success.

== Cast ==
- Gemini Ganesan
- B. Saroja Devi
- T. S. Balaiah
- P. Kannamba
- S. V. Subbaiah
- T. P. Muthulakshmi
- V. K. Ramasamy
- K. Malathi
- Kuladeivam Rajagopal
- G. Sakunthala
- T. S. Muthaiah
- Sandow M. M. A. Chinnappa Thevar
- Master Murali

== Production ==
Vaazha Vaitha Deivam was the first film for Aaroor Dass as a "full fledged story and dialogue writer". At his suggestion, Gemini Ganesan and B. Saroja Devi were cast as the lead pair. According to T. S. Balaiah's son Junior Balaiah, when the producer Thevar named this film, he had Balaiah in mind.

== Soundtrack ==
Music was by K. V. Mahadevan and lyrics were written by Thanjai N. Ramaiah Dass, A. Maruthakasi, Pattukkottai Kalyanasundaram, A. S. Narayanan and Kovai Kumaradevan.

Songs	Singers	Length
"Kaaveri Thaan Singari"	T. M. Soundararajan & P. Susheela	03:16
"Engi Malai Uchiyile"	T. M. Soundararajan	04:22
"Kolli Malai Saaralile"	S. C. Krishnan & L. R. Eswari	02:51
"Chinnaala Patti"	T. M. Soundararajan	03:28
"Vennilave Kaadhal Kadhai"	P. Susheela	04:09
"Anna Nadaikkaari"	T. M. Soundararajan	02:57
"Vaazha Vaitha Deivam"	T. M. Soundararajan & L. R. Eswari	03:13

== Release ==
Vaazha Vaitha Deivam was released on 28 August 1959, and emerged a box office success. It was dubbed into Telugu as Karmika Vijayam, which did not meet with the same success.
