= Petralthan Pillaiya =

1966 film by Krishnan–Panju

- Theatrical release poster
- Directed by: Krishnan–Panju
- Screenplay by: Aaroor Dass
- Based on: The Kid by Charlie Chaplin
- Produced by: K. K. Vasu
- Starring: M. G. Ramachandran; B. Saroja Devi; Sowcar Janaki
- Cinematography: P. N. Sundaram
- Edited by: S. Panjabi
- Music by: M. S. Viswanathan
- Production company: Sri Muthukumaran Pictures
- Release date: 9 December 1966
- Running time: 168 minutes
- Country: India
- Language: Tamil

Petralthan Pillaiya (Note: There is no direct translation for the film's title in English; Sachi Sri Kantha's attempted translation is "Should one give birth to own a child?", writer R. Kannan says it means "Is only a biological child a child", and T. G. Vaidyanathan of the magazine Film World says it means that "somebody can be your son even if you haven't given birth to him".) (lit. 'Only if you give birth to them') is a 1966 Indian Tamil-language drama film directed by Krishnan–Panju and written by Aaroor Dass. The film stars M. G. Ramachandran, B. Saroja Devi and Sowcar Janaki. Based on the 1921 American film, The Kid, it revolves around a tramp finding a homeless boy and raising him as his own son until five years later the boy's biological parents try to find him.

Petralthan Pillaiya was released on 9 December 1966. The film emerged a commercial success, running for over 100 days in theatres. It was remade in Malayalam as Ashtamirohini (1975).

== Plot ==
Jeeva is a mother unable to afford the cost of raising a young boy. She abandons him in a temple where a tramp, Anandhan, discovers him. Anandhan tries to get rid of the boy, but he eventually becomes attached to him. Anandhan names the boy Kannan and educates him, despite his poor financial condition. Five years later, Jeeva, her husband Sekhar and social services try to find her son.

== Cast ==
- M. G. Ramachandran as Anandhan
- B. Saroja Devi as Mohini
- Sowcar Janaki as Jeeva
- M. R. Radha as Kabali
- S. A. Ashokan as Sekhar
- K. A. Thangavelu as Panjavarnam
- M. N. Nambiar as Mani
- T. S. Balaiah as the old policeman
- Baby Shakila as Kannan
- Indira Devi as Kala
- Mohana

== Production ==
Petralthan Pillaiya is based on Charlie Chaplin's 1921 American film, The Kid. Writer Aaroor Dass initially narrated the story to Sivaji Ganesan, who seemed interested but "did not follow up"; he later gave it to M. G. Ramachandran. The duo Krishnan–Panju (R. Krishnan and S. Panju) directed the film, and Panju edited the film under the alias S. Panjabi. It was produced by K. K. Vasu under the banner Sri Muthukumaran Pictures, and photographed by P. N. Sundaram. M. R. Radha paid ₹100,000 (equivalent to ₹8.0 million or US$83,000 in 2026) to Vasu, and acted in the film without charging. Principal photography began in June 1964. Petralthan Pillaiya remains the only film produced by Vasu.

== Soundtrack ==
M. S. Viswanathan composed the soundtrack, and the lyrics were written by Vaali. The song "Nalla Nalla Pillaigalai" had to be modified after the censor board objected to the lyric "Arignar Annappol" (Like Anna, the scholar), referring to the politician C. N. Annadurai. This was changed to "Thiru Vi Ka pol" (Like Thiru Vi Ka), a reference to the scholar and activist Thiru. V. Kalyanasundaram.

Track listing
No.	Title	Singer(s)	Length
1.	"Chakkara Katti"	T. M. Soundararajan, P. Susheela	3:23
2.	"Chellakkiliye"	T. M. Soundararajan	3:15
3.	"Chellakkiliye" (Pathos)	P. Susheela	2:43
4.	"Kannan Piranthaan"	T. M. Soundararajan, P. Susheela	5:27
5.	"Nalla Nalla Pillaigalai"	P. Susheela, Sirkazhi Govindarajan	6:26
6.	"Nalla Nalla Pillaigalai" (Solo)	T. M. Soundararajan	3:26
Total length:			24:40

== Release and reception ==
Petralthan Pillaiya was released on 9 December 1966. Kalki said the film was strictly for those who would prefer affection towards children over love. The film emerged a commercial success, running for over 100 days in theatres.

== Bibliography ==
- Kannan, R. (28 June 2017). MGR: A Life. India: Penguin Random House. ISBN 978-93-86495-88-4.
