= Vivasayi =

1967 film by M. A. Thirumugam

- Theatrical release poster
- Directed by: M. A. Thirumugam
- Story by: Sandow M. M. A. Chinnappa Thevar
- Produced by: Sandow M. M. A. Chinnappa Thevar
- Starring: M. G. Ramachandran; K. R. Vijaya
- Cinematography: N. S. Varma
- Edited by: M. A. Thirumugam; M. G. Balu Rao
- Music by: K. V. Mahadevan
- Production company: Devar Films
- Distributed by: Senthil Movies
- Release date: 1 November 1967
- Running time: 155 minutes
- Country: India
- Language: Tamil

Vivasayi (/ˈvɪvəsaɪ.i/ transl. Farmer) is a 1967 Indian Tamil-language film, directed by M. A. Thirumugam and produced by Sandow M. M. A. Chinnappa Thevar. The film stars M. G. Ramachandran and K. R. Vijaya, with M. N. Nambiar, S. A. Ashokan, Nagesh and Manorama in supporting roles. It was released on 1 November 1967, during Diwali.

== Plot ==
Muthaiya is a young agronomist and a farmer, full of ingenuity, integrity, and hard work. He is the pride of his parents, the big landowner, Pannaiyar Duraiswamy, and of his wife, the devoted Sivagami. He revolutionises farming on the family's lands by applying new methods of sowing. He so hopes to multiply tenfold the yield for humanitarian purposes and not necessarily for profit. Because one day, he takes the defence of unfortunate farmers despoiled of their ground, by his neighbour, another big farmer, Pannaiyar Velupandhiyan, an unscrupulous man, Muthaiya incurs the wrath of this very vindictive character. The situation complicates when the attractive Vijaya falls in love with the beautiful Muthaiya. Indeed, she is to be the sister-in-law of Velupandhiyan. And that the latter desired her ardently under the nose of his wife, the devoted believer Kaveri. To see her taking off from between his fingers, makes him particularly dangerous and obnoxious with his wife, Kaveri. Now, Muthaiya is even more in danger, Velupandhiyan wants to kill him.

== Cast ==
- M. G. Ramachandran as Muthaiya
- M. N. Nambiar as Pannaiyar Velupandiyan
- S. A. Ashokan as Gurusamy
- V. K. Ramasamy as Chokki's father, a pawnbroker
- Major Sundarrajan as Pannaiyar Duraisamy
- Sandow M. M. A. Chinnappa Thevar as Madasamy
- Nagesh as Chokkan
- K. R. Vijaya as Vijaya
- C. R. Vijayakumari as Kaveri
- Manorama as Chokki
- S. N. Lakshmi as Sivagami
- Rangammal - uncredited role

== Production ==
After M. G. Ramachandran was shot in the throat by M. R. Radha on 12 January 1967, and was recovering in the hospital, Sandow M. M. A. Chinnappa Thevar visited him there and paid the advance for Vivasayi. The title song was filmed at the fields of the Tamil Nadu Agricultural University.

== Soundtrack ==
The music was composed by K. V. Mahadevan. The song "Ippadithaan Irukka Venum" stipulates how women should behave through its lyrics like "uduppugalai iduppu theriya maatakoodadhu" and "udhattu melay sivapu saayam poosa koodadhu".

Track listing
No.	Title	Lyrics	Singer(s)	Length
1.	"Nalla Nalla Nilam Parthu"	Udumalai Narayana Kavi	T. M. Soundararajan	3:39
2.	"Ennama Singara"	A. Maruthakasi	T. M. Soundararajan, P. Susheela	3:34
3.	"Ippadithan Irukka Venum"	Udumalai Narayana Kavi	T. M. Soundararajan, P. Susheela	3:41
4.	"Kadavul Ennum"	A. Maruthakasi	T. M. Soundararajan	3:45
5.	"Yevaradithum"	Udumalai Narayana Kavi	P. Susheela	3:21
6.	"Kadhal Enthan"	Udumalai Narayana Kavi	T. M. Soundararajan, P. Susheela	3:45
7.	"Vivasayi"	A. Maruthakasi	T. M. Soundararajan	4:22
Total length:				24.77

== Release and reception ==
Vivasayi was released on 1 November 1967, Diwali day, and distributed by Senthil Movies. The Indian Express wrote, "The film is conspicuous for its lack of living with reality—though pretending to be one." Kalki said there was nothing to say about the film's story or cast performances.
