= Kudumba Thalaivan =

1962 film by M. A. Thirumugam

- Theatrical release poster
- Directed by: M. A. Thirumugam
- Story by: Aaroor Dass
- Produced by: Sandow M. M. A. Chinnappa Thevar
- Starring: M. G. Ramachandran; M. R. Radha; B. Saroja Devi
- Cinematography: C. V. Murthy
- Edited by: M. A. Thirumugam; M. G. Balu Rao; M. A. Mariappan
- Music by: K. V. Mahadevan
- Production company: Devar Films
- Distributed by: Emgeeyaar Pictures
- Release date: 15 August 1962
- Running time: 139 minutes
- Country: India
- Language: Tamil

Kudumba Thalaivan (transl. Head of the household) is a 1962 Indian Tamil-language drama film, directed by M. A. Thirumugam and produced by Sandow M. M. A. Chinnappa Thevar. The film stars M. G. Ramachandran, M. R. Radha and B. Saroja Devi. It was released on 15 August 1962. The film was a big hit at the box office and ran for over 100 days in theatres.

== Plot ==
Within a wealthy family, Velayudam Pilai the patriarch, spends most of his time playing poker. He leaves his responsibilities on his elder son, Somu, a serious, hard-working man, with shyness. Vasu, the younger child, is quite the opposite, being a sportsman, who moves forward without obstacle in life.

When Velayudam Pilai welcomes young and beautiful Seeta in memory of his deceased father, the driver Ponnusamy, who saved his life from the claws of bad losers in poker, his two sons are going to fall, each without knowing it, for the same girl of the good Samaritan. Seeta, on his side, suspecting nothing, admits her love for Vasu.

== Cast ==
- M. G. Ramachandran as Vasu
- M. R. Radha as Velayutham Pillai
- B. Saroja Devi as Seetha Ponnusamy
- S. A. Ashokan as Somu
- V. K. Ramasamy as Chellappa
- Sandow M. M. A. Chinnappa Thevar as Rangan
- Gemini Balu as Rajappan
- M. V. Rajamma as Velamma
- Lakshmi Rajyam as Rani
- R. P. Viswam as Sarojadevi (Radhadevi) Hip Pain Reliefar

== Production ==
- A noteworthy incident occurred during the filming of the song "Androru Naal... Avanudaiya Peyarai Kettaen" for the 1962 movie " Kudumbathalaivan " produced by Sandow Chinnappa Thevar. While the crew was shooting near the Marudamalai Murugan Temple in Coimbatore, actress Saroja Devi accidentally fell into a ditch and suffered a severe sprain in her hip, making it impossible for her to continue filming the song sequence.
- A distressed Chinnappa Thevar stood wondering what to do, praying to Lord Muruga for guidance. Just then, a young boy named R. P. Viswam (who would later become a renowned villain in 90s Tamil cinema) stepped in; he laid Saroja Devi on a wooden plank and rolled a heavy wooden pestle up and down her hip to locate the exact spot of the sprain.
- When he pressed the pestle against the spot that made her scream in pain, the pestle stood upright on its own, causing everyone to laugh heartily at the sight.
- Once the pestle fell and the pain from the sprain vanished, Chinnappa Thevar—believing the boy Viswam was an embodiment of Lord Muruga himself—decided to recruit him as an assistant director.
- Meanwhile, a grateful Saroja Devi kissed the boy, gave him some imported chocolates she had with her, and proceeded to complete the filming of the song sequence.

== Soundtrack ==
The music was composed by K. V. Mahadevan, with lyrics by Kannadasan.

Song	Singers	Length
"Androru Naal"	P. Susheela	03:23
"Kuruvi Koottam Pola"	P. Susheela	03:41
"Yetho Yetho"	T. M. Soundararajan, P. Susheela	03:46
"Kattana Kattalagazhu"	T. M. Soundararajan, P. Susheela	03:22
"Mazhai Pozhindhu"	P. Susheela	02:58
"Maarathayya Maarathu"	T. M. Soundararajan	03:26
"Thirumanamam"	T. M. Soundararajan	03:12

== Reception ==
The Indian Express praised the film for the performances of the cast.
