= Maa (1976 film) =

1976 film by M. A. Thirumugam

- Poster
- Directed by: M. A. Thirumugam
- Story by: Sandow M. M. A. Chinnappa Thevar
- Produced by: Sandow M.M.A. Chinnappa Devar
- Starring: Dharmendra; Hema Malini
- Cinematography: V. Ramamurthy
- Edited by: M. A. Thirumugam; M.G. Balu Rao
- Music by: Laxmikant–Pyarelal
- Release date: 1976
- Country: India
- Language: Hindi

Maa (transl. Mother) is a 1976 Indian Hindi-language adventure film directed by M. A. Thirumugam and produced by Sandow M. M. A. Chinnappa Thevar, who produced the 1971 blockbuster Haathi Mere Saathi. It stars Dharmendra and Hema Malini in pivotal roles. It was remade in Tamil as Annai Oru Aalayam (1979) and in Telugu as Amma Evarikaina Amma (1979).

== Synopsis ==
Vijay lives with his mother in a palatial house deep in the jungles in South India where he makes a living trapping animals for circuses, zoos - both nationally and internationally. He meets a beautiful U.S.-returned Nimmi, who is the daughter of Vijay's exclusive animal buyer. They both fall in love with each other and want to get married. Vijay's mother cautions them both against separating new-born animals from their birth mothers, but both refuse to listen. Then the unexpected happens, a mother lioness, angered at Vijay for taking her cubs, attacks him, and leaves him badly wounded. With the help of his mother, and Nimmi, Vijay recovers and despite his recent attack and his mother's warning, he again goes to trap animals - this time a baby elephant for a circus. He manages to trap the elephant in a pit, but the angered mother elephant pursues them, even after they transport it in a truck. Her maternal and protective instincts come to the foreplay, she overtakes the truck, dismantles it, but is chased away by Vijay and his employees. She turns to attack Vijay, but his mother intervenes - and is instantly attacked and crushed. Holding his mother in his arms, Vijay swears to hunt the elephant as well as all other animals and kill them one by one, but his dying mother makes him promise that he will not do so. Vijay's mom tells him to instead return all cubs to their parents, as well as the baby elephant. Vijay promises to do so, and his mother passes away. Vijay is devastated, in heart-wrenching sorrow & pain, he calls out to his mother, and carries out her promise. He releases all trapped animals, and returns the cubs to the jungle. But returning the baby elephant, Ganesh, is another issue altogether as it has been transported to the city, and must be brought back. When Vijay goes to bring it back, he finds out that the truck had broken down, the elephant had escaped and is loose in the city. He desperately goes around looking for it. In the meantime back home, the mother elephant is on a rampage, enraged at being separated from her child, it crushes vegetation, attacks villagers, and tears down their dwellings. And the next target that looms before it is none other than Vijay's beloved - Nimmi.

== Cast ==
- Dharmendra as Vijay
- Hema Malini as Nimmi
- Nirupa Roy as Vijay's Mother
- Om Prakash as Gopaldas (Nimmi's Father)
- Ranjeet as Balraj
- Padma Khanna as Balraj's Girlfriend
- Paintal as Vijay's Employee
- Brahmachari as Vijay's Employee

== Soundtrack ==
Lyricist: Anand Bakshi.

Song	Singer
"Aisi Koi Baat Jo"	Kishore Kumar, Lata Mangeshkar
"Aaun Ke Jaaun"	Lata Mangeshkar
"Shehron Se Door"	Lata Mangeshkar
"Main Jangal Ka Raja, Meri Rani Kaisi Ho"	Lata Mangeshkar, Mohammed Rafi
"Hataari, Main Shikari"	Mohammed Rafi
"Gaaunga, Naachunga"	Mohammed Rafi
"Maa Tujhe Dhoondun Kahan"	Mohammed Rafi
