= Neelamalai Thirudan =

1957 film by M. A. Thirumugam

- Theatrical release poster
- Directed by: M. A. Thirumugam
- Story by: Sa. Ayyaiah Pillai
- Produced by: Sandow M. M. A. Chinnappa Thevar
- Starring: R. Ranjan; Anjali Devi; P. S. Veerappa; K. A. Thangavelu
- Cinematography: V. N. Reddy
- Edited by: M. A. Thirumugam
- Music by: K. V. Mahadevan
- Production company: Devar Films
- Release date: 20 September 1957
- Running time: 150 minutes
- Country: India
- Language: Tamil

Neelamalai Thirudan (transl. Thief of the Blue Hill) is a 1957 Indian Tamil-language swashbuckler film directed and edited by M. A. Thirumugam, produced by Sandow M. M. A. Chinnappa Thevar and written by S. Ayyaiah Pillai. The film stars R. Ranjan and Anjali Devi, with T. S. Balaiah, K. A. Thangavelu, P. S. Veerappa, M. K. Radha, E. R. Sahadevan, Kannamba and E. V. Saroja in supporting roles. It revolves around a man seeking to take revenge from a greedy uncle who had caused separation of his family in childhood.

Neelamalai Thirudan was originally planned with M. G. Ramachandran, and the script tailored to suit the actor's image, but Ramachandran did not give Thevar call sheet dates as he was committed to other projects; hence, Ranjan was cast. The film was released on 20 September 1957 and became a success.

== Plot ==
A good-hearted man has two siblings: a kind sister named Lakshmi and an evil brother named Nagappan, who lusts for the family's wealth. The kind brother has a son, and his sister has a daughter called Maragatham. Aware of Nagappan's plans, the good brother leaves the family home and entrusts his son to take care of his sister and her husband Thangappan. After learning of his brother's departure, Nagappan searches for him and his family and orders his henchman Nanjappan to kill them. The family gets separated. The boy, now grown up, takes up arms against his evil uncle. He helps the downtrodden, exposes villains and restores peace. In the end, the whole family is reunited.

== Cast ==
Actors

- R. Ranjan as Neelamalai Thirudan
- T. S. Balaiah as a police officer
- K. A. Thangavelu as Chithambaram
- P. S. Veerappa as Zamindar Nagappan
- M. K. Radha as Thangappan
- E. R. Sahadevan as Neelamalai Thirudan's father
- K. Sairam as Constable 101
- Sandow M. M. A. Chinnappa as Nanjappan
- Master Vijayakumar as young Neelamalai Thirudan

Actresses

- Anjali Devi as Maragatham
- Kannamba as Lakshmi
- E. V. Saroja as Chokki
- Baby Uma as young Maragatham

== Production ==
The producer Sandow M. M. A. Chinnappa Thevar wanted to make Neelamalai Thirudan with his close friend M. G. Ramachandran starring, and the script was tailored to suit the actor's image. To Thevar's surprise, Ramachandran did not give him call sheet dates as he was committed to several other projects, including Nadodi Mannan (1958). Thevar then signed on R. Ranjan, to Ramachandran's dismay. The film was written by S. Ayyaiah Pillai, and directed by Thevar's brother M. A. Thirumugam who also handled the editing. Cinematography was handled by V. N. Reddy, with C. V. Moorthy assisting. Two animal actors – a horse named Iqbal and a dog named Tiger – were prominently used.

== Soundtrack ==
Music was composed by K. V. Mahadevan. The song "Sathiyame Latchiyamai" underlines "the philosophy of life and the importance of helping the downtrodden and destroying the villains". It attained popularity, and is often aired on Tamil television channels.

Song	Singer	Lyricist	Length
"Chithirai Madha Nilavu"	G. Kasthoori	Puratchidasan	02:18
"Konjum Mozhi Penngalukku"	Jikki	A. Maruthakasi	03:28
"Vethalai Pakku"	S. C. Krishnan & A. G. Rathnamala	Thanjai N. Ramaiah Dass	02:27
"Sathiyame Latchiyamai"	T. M. Soundararajan	A. Maruthakasi	03:39
"Ullam Kollai"	Jikki	A. Maruthakasi	03:59
"Yengi Yengi"	Jikki	Thanjai N. Ramaiah Doss	03:21
"Kannalam" (Onnukku Rendatchi)	S. C. Krishnan & A. G. Rathnamala	A. Maruthakasi	02:03
"Sirikkiran Moraikkiran"	T. M. Soundararajan & Jikki	Thanjai N. Ramaiah Doss	04:32

== Release and reception ==
Neelamalai Thirudan was released on 20 September 1957, and became a success. According to historian Randor Guy, a contributing factor was Ranjan's Robin Hood-inspired performance. Jambavan of Kalki negatively reviewed the film, criticising Ranjan's performance and the numerous plot holes.
