= Thozhilali =

1964 film by M. A. Thirumurugam

- Theatrical release poster
- Directed by: M. A. Thirumugam
- Story by: Sandow M. M. A. Chinnappa Thevar
- Produced by: Sandow M. M. A. Chinnappa Thevar
- Starring: M. G. Ramachandran; K. R. Vijaya; Rathna
- Cinematography: N. S. Varma
- Music by: K. V. Mahadevan
- Production company: Devar Films
- Release date: 25 September 1964
- Running time: 140 minutes
- Country: India
- Language: Tamil

Thozhilali (transl. Worker) is a 1964 Indian Tamil-language film directed by M. A. Thirumugam and produced by Sandow M. M. A. Chinnappa Thevar who also wrote the story. Drawing inspiration from Thevar's early life as a milk supplier before he became a wealthy film producer, it stars M. G. Ramachandran, K. R. Vijaya and newcomer Rathna. The film was released on 25 September 1964 and became a box-office success.

== Plot ==
Raju, an industrious young man raised by a widowed mother, excels in his studies and works hard to rise above poverty, drawing the jealousy of wealthy neighbors. After joining a local bus company, he earns the respect of his boss Murugappan, but complications ensue when Murugappan's daughter Meena falls in love with him. Because Raju loves the intelligent Vijaya, he declines Meena's affections, leading Murugappan to dismiss him. Raju ultimately overcomes this professional setback through his enduring work ethic.

== Cast ==
Male cast

- M. G. Ramachandran as Raju
- M. N. Nambiar as Velu
- S. A. Ashokan as M. Murugappa
- Nagesh as Kithan

Female cast

- K. R. Vijaya as Meena
- Rathna as Vijaya
- Manorama as Chandira
- S. N. Lakshmi as Raju's mother

== Production ==
Thozhilali marked the acting debut of Rathna. The film was inspired by Sandow M. M. A. Chinnappa Thevar's early life as a milk supplier before he became a wealthy film producer in a rags to riches manner. While Thevar himself wrote the story, Aaroor Dass wrote the dialogues.

== Soundtrack ==
The soundtrack was composed by K. V. Mahadevan.

Track listing
No.	Title	Lyrics	Singer(s)	Length
1.	"Aandavan Ulagathin"	Alangudi Somu	T. M. Soundararajan	3:10
2.	"Aazham Theriyaamal"	Alangudi Somu	Sirkazhi Govindarajan L. R. Eswari	2:53
3.	"Azhagan Azhagan"	Mayavanathan	S. Janaki, P. Susheela	3:38
4.	"Varuga Varuga"	Mayavanathan	T. M. Soundararajan, P. Susheela	2:31
5.	"Enna Koduppai"	Mayavanathan	T. M. Soundararajan, P. Susheela	2:54
6.	"Kalai Vantha Vitham"	K. P. Sundaram	P. Susheela	3:07
7.	"Valarvathu Kannukku"	Alangudi Somu	T. M. Soundararajan, P. Susheela	3:37
Total length:				21:50

== Release and reception ==
Thozhilali was released on 25 September 1964. Writing for Sport and Pastime, T. M. Ramachandran praised M. A. Thirumugam's direction, saying he has "shown much improvement in skill and ability as a box-office wizard" and also praised N. S. Varma's cinematography and performances of the artistes. The film became a box-office success, running for over 100 days in theatres.
