= Thaikku Thalaimagan =

- Theatrical release poster
- Directed by: M. A. Thirumugam
- Story by: Sandow M. M. A. Chinnappa Thevar
- Produced by: Sandow M. M. A. Chinnappa Thevar
- Starring: M. G. Ramachandran; Jayalalithaa
- Cinematography: N. S. Varma
- Edited by: M. A. Thirumugam
- Music by: K. V. Mahadevan
- Production company: Thevar Films
- Release date: 13 January 1967
- Running time: 145 minutes
- Country: India
- Language: Tamil

Thaikku Thalaimagan (transl. The eldest son of a mother) is a 1967 Indian Tamil-language drama film, directed by M. A. Thirumugam. The film stars M. G. Ramachandran, Jayalalithaa and S. A. Ashokan. It was released on 13 January 1967.

== Plot ==
Within a peaceful family garage, The Marudhachalam Murthi Automobiles, a drama is slowly but surely being formed. Somaiya, the elder son of this small company aims and aspires to have unreal perspectives. On the other hand, Marudhu, the younger brother behaves in a reflexive way, clearly more responsible. But contrary to all expectations, their mother sides with her first-born, blinded by her love, she supports him in everything, while making her youngest son feel guilty, ceaselessly. As if it was not enough, Somaiya became infatuated with a beautiful bitchy girl, Nalini who sees more in his money than in the beautiful eyes.

== Cast ==
- M. G. Ramachandran as Marudhu (alias Marudhur)
- S. V. Ranga Rao as Cholaiya Pannaiyar Dharmalingham
- S. A. Ashokan as Somu (alias Somaiya)
- Nagesh as Kuppu
- R. S. Manohar as Ranga)
- Sandow M. M. A. Chinnappa Thevar as a close friend of Meenakshi's family
- Jayalalithaa as Malathi
- Sowcar Janaki as Gauri
- Manorama as Munimma
- S. N. Lakshmi as Meenakshi
- Baby R. Geetha as Mani
- Rajasree (Guest-star) as Nalini

== Soundtrack ==
The music was composed by K. V. Mahadevan and lyrics written by Kannadasan.

Song	Singers	Length
"Ainthikku Mele"	L. R. Eswari	03:07
"Parthu Kondathu Kannukku"	T. M. Soundararajan, P. Susheela	03:55
"Vazha Vendum Manam"	T. M. Soundararajan, P. Susheela	03:44

== Release and reception ==
On 12 January 1967, the day before the release of this film, M. G. Ramachandran was shot in the throat by M. R. Radha. Kalki wrote.
