= Thaikkupin Tharam =

1956 film by M. A. Thirumugam

- Theatrical release poster
- Directed by: M. A. Thirumugam
- Written by: S. Ayyapillai
- Produced by: Sandow M. M. A. Chinnappa Thevar
- Starring: M. G. Ramachandran; P. Bhanumathi; T. S. Balaiah; P. Kannamba
- Cinematography: R. R. Chandran
- Edited by: M. A. Thirumugam; M. A. Mariappan; M. G. Balu Rao
- Music by: K. V. Mahadevan
- Production company: Thevar Films
- Distributed by: Subbu & Co.
- Release date: 21 September 1956
- Running time: 157 minutes
- Country: India
- Language: Tamil

Thaikkupin Tharam (transl. Wife after Mother) is a 1956 Indian Tamil-language film, the directorial debut of M. A. Thirumugam. The film stars M. G. Ramachandran and P. Bhanumathi. It was the first film produced by Sandow M. M. A. Chinnappa Thevar under the then newly-formed Thevar Films. Thaikkupin Tharam was released on 21 September 1956 and ran for over 100 days in theatres.

== Plot ==
Muthaiyan is the brave son of Ratnam Pillai and Meenakshi. They are landed gentry and are highly respected in the village for their noble deeds. Meenakshi's brother Doraiswami, on the other hand, is disliked by all for his arrogance, cruelty and dishonourable ways. The two families have not been on speaking terms ever since Doraiswami tried to usurp Ratnam Pillai's traditional rights at the temple festival. Doraiswami's daughter, Sivakami, however, is a good-natured girl who is in love with Muthaiyan. Muthaiyan too reciprocates her love and they are determined to surmount all hurdles and get married. When Doraiswami's men capture Muthaiyan and keep him a prisoner on the pretext that he had hurled stones at Doraiswami's prized bull when he had caught it grazing on his crops, Sivakami comes to his rescue.

Meanwhile, accosting Doraiswami demanding his son's release, Ratnam Pillai declares bravely that he would overpower the touted bull. But the bull gores him to death. In his dying breath, he elicits a promise from Meenakshi that she would ensure that their son sets right this slur on their honour. Muthaiyan's mother makes him promise that he would not even think of Sivakami any more. Sivakami's father too has isolated her in house arrest and has started looking out for a suitable husband for her.

At a bullock cart race for Sivakami's hand, Doraiswami sabotages Muthaiyan's cart, and although he is first, he injures right after crossing the finish line. Doraiswami tells off Sivakami for her support of Muthaiyan and Meenakshi, while tending to Muthaiyan's injuries, tells him to not talk to Sivakami. The two meet each other that night anyway but are seen by a servant of Doraiswami, as well as Meenakshi.

How Muthaiyan wins the hand of Sivakami after overpowering the mighty bull Senkodan and reforming his wily uncle forms rest of the tale.

== Cast ==
Male cast

- M. G. Ramachandran as Muthaiyan
- T. S. Balaiah as Duraisami Pannaiyar
- E. R. Sahadevan as Rathnam Pillai
- Kaka Radhakrishnan as Velan
- Sandow M. M. A. Chinnappa (Thevar) as Mayandi

Female cast

- P. Bhanumathi as Sivakami
- P. Kannamba as Meenakshi
- Surabhi. Balasaraswathi as Selva
- G. Sakunthala as Valli
- K. Rathnam as Senkamalam
- K. R. Saradambal as Patti

Dance

- Sayee–Subbulakshmi

== Production ==
Thaikkupin Tharam was the directorial debut of M. A. Thirumugam, and the first film produced by Sandow M. M. A. Chinnappa Thevar under the then newly-formed Thevar Films. Principal photography commenced on 5 July 1955 in the sets put up at Vauhini Studios, with Nagi Reddi cranking the camera for the first shot. Thirumugam also took care of editing, assisted by M. A. Mariappan and M. G. Balu Rao.

== Soundtrack ==
The music was composed by K. V. Mahadevan.

Song	Singers	Lyrics	Length
"Manushanai Manushan Saapiduraandaa"	T. M. Soundararajan	A. Maruthakasi	04:18
"Aahaa Nam Aasai Niraiverumaa"	T. M. Soundararajan & P. Bhanumathi	Kavi Lakshmanadas	03:02
"Naadu Sezhitthida Naalum Uzhaitthida"	M. L. Vasanthakumari	Kavi Lakshmanadas	04:54
"Asaindhaadum Thendrale Thoodhu Sellaayo"	P. Bhanumathi	Thanjai N. Ramaiah Dass	03:13
"Vittadhadi Aasai...Eravuttu Eni Edukkum"	S. C. Krishnan & A. G. Rathnamala	Thanjai N. Ramaiah Dass	03:18
"Kaadhal Viyaadhi Polladhadhu"	Jikki	Thanjai N. Ramaiah Dass	02:41
"Thandhayaipppol...Annaiyum Pidhaavum"	T. M. Soundararajan	Thanjai N. Ramaiah Dass	03:11
"En Kaadhal Inbam Idhuthaana"	A. M. Rajah & P. Bhanumathi	Thanjai N. Ramaiah Dass	03:35
"Kandhaavaram Thandharlvaan Thiruchendhooril; Vaazhvone Vandhaaluvaan"	S. C. Krishnan, A. G. Rathnamala & chorus	T. S. Natarajan, Sandow M. M. A. Chinnappa Thevar	04:35

== Release and reception ==
Thaikkupin Tharam was released on 21 September 1956, delayed from a 14 September release. The Indian Express wrote the film is "a picture distinctive for theme and treatment alike. Neither a social nor a conventional thriller, yet ambitious to combine the powers of both, it is a fantasia". According to historian Sachi Sri Kantha, it was the "first successful movie in a social theme" for Ramachandran. The film ran for over 100 days in theatres.
