= Karthigai Deepam (film) =

- Poster
- Directed by: A. Kasilingam
- Written by: R. Dhayanidhi; Shankar Jai Somu (Only Comedy)
- Produced by: A. Kasilingam; P. Markandeyan
- Starring: S. A. Ashokan; C. Vasantha; Leelavathi; K. Vijayan; S. V. Ramadas
- Cinematography: G. Durai
- Edited by: A. Sastha; S. Natarajan
- Music by: R. Sudarsanam
- Production company: M. K. Movies
- Release date: 30 April 1965
- Running time: 140 minutes
- Country: India
- Language: Tamil

Karthigai Deepam is a 1965 Indian Tamil-language romantic drama film, directed by A. Kasilingam and produced by P. Markendeyan and A. Kasilingam. The script was written by A. Kasilingam and the comedy parts were written by Shankar Jai Somu. The film stars S. A. Ashokan, C. Vasantha, K. Vijayan and Leelavathi. It was released on 30 April 1965.

== Cast ==
- S. A. Ashokan as Pasubathi
- C. Vasantha as Poornam
- K. Vijayan as Kanaga Sabai
- Leelavathi as Thangam
- S. V. Ramadas as Namachivayam
- G. Sakunthala as Dr. Sathya Bhama
- Sadhan as Venu
- A. Sakunthala as Chandra
- Karikol Raju as Ganapathy
- Master Murali as Murali
- Baby Kala as Kala
- Jayanthi as Mythili
- Thiruchi Kamakshi as Sivakami

== Soundtrack ==
Music was composed by R. Sudarsanam and lyrics were written by Alangudi Somu.

Song	Singers	Length
"Enna Paravai Sirakadithu"	T. M. Soundararajan	03:43
"Kaiyum Kaiyum Modhinal"	L. R. Eswari	03:29
"Paarkatha Ulagam"	T. M. Soundararajan, L. R. Eswari	03:40
"Thanga Theril"	L. R. Eswari	03:22
"Enna Paravai" – Sad	T. M. Soundararajan	01:09
"Ungu Unnuda Selvame"	L. R. Eswari	03:49
"Enna Paravai" – Female	P. Susheela	03:30
"Malai Sainthu Ponal"	T. M. Soundararajan	04:57

== Reception ==
Kalki appreciated the performances of Ashokan and Leelavathi, though the critic felt Ashokan was occasionally overacting.
