= Thaayum Magalum =

- Theatrical release poster
- Directed by: M. A. Thirumugam
- Screenplay by: (Dialogues) Thiyaagan
- Story by: Sandow M. M. A. Chinnappa Thevar
- Produced by: Sandow M. M. A. Chinnappa Thevar
- Starring: S. A. Ashokan; Adhithan; K. R. Vijaya
- Music by: P. S. Diwakar
- Production company: Dhandayuthapani Films
- Release date: 28 May 1965
- Running time: 166 minutes
- Country: India
- Language: Tamil

Thaayum Magalum (transl. Mother and Daughter) is a 1965 Indian Tamil-language historical drama film directed by M. A. Thirumugam and produced by Sandow M. M. A. Chinnappa Thevar. The film stars S. A. Ashokan, Adhithan and K. R. Vijaya. It was released on 28 May 1965.

== Cast ==
The list is adapted from Thiraikalanjiyam Part2.

Male cast

- S. A. Ashokan as Vijay
- Adhithan
- S. V. Subbaiah as Subramaniyam
- V. K. Ramasamy
- Thaai Nagesh
- T. R. Natarajan
- Sandow M. M. A. Chinnappa Thevar
- S. V. Ramadas
- Master Ramachandran

Female cast

- K. R. Vijaya as Sumathi
- M. V. Rajamma as Saraswathi
- Manorama
- S. Rajamani
- Baby Kausalya
- Mala

== Production ==
Sandow M. M. A. Chinnappa Thevar usually produced films under the banner Devar Films starring M. G. Ramachandran with music composed by K. V. Mahadevan. He launched Dhandayuthapani Films to produce films with a different cast and crew. This is one such film. Dialogues were written by Thiyaagan while supervised by Kannadasan. Chandrabose, who later became a composer, began his career as a child artist in this film.

== Soundtrack ==
Music was composed by P. S. Diwakar and the lyrics were penned by Kannadasan.

Song	Singer/s	Length
"Thaayum Magalum Kovilile"	K. J. Jesudas, T. M. Soundararajan & L. R. Eswari	
"Vettattaa Thattattaa"	L. R. Eswari & Adham Shaw	03:28
"Thangachi Penne Chellammaa"	P. Susheela & group	03:14
"Chithiraiyil Nilaveduthu"	T. M. Soundararajan & P. Susheela	03:25
"Kaiyile Oru Tie, Kaalile Oru Tie"	L. R. Eswari & K. J. Jesudas	02:59
"Kaattrulla Podhe Thoothikka Venum"	T. M. Soundararajan, K. J. Jesudas, P. Susheela, L. R. Eswari & group	03:33
"Vaammaa Vaamma Mayakkam Ennammaa"	T. M. Soundararajan & L. R. Eswari	03:32

== Reception ==
Kalki called the film a routine "raja rani" (king and queen) story, despite its title giving the impression of a contemporary story, but said Vijaya and Rajamma gave life to the film.
