= Kanni Thai =

1965 film by M. A. Thirumugam

- Theatrical release poster
- Directed by: M. A. Thirumugam
- Produced by: Sandow M. M. A. Chinnappa Thevar
- Starring: M. G. Ramachandran; K. R. Vijaya; Jayalalithaa
- Cinematography: N. S. Varma
- Edited by: M. A. Thirumugam; M. G. Balu Rao
- Music by: K. V. Mahadevan
- Production company: Thevar Films
- Release date: 10 September 1965
- Running time: 123 minutes
- Country: India
- Language: Tamil

Kanni Thai (transl. Virgin mother) is a 1965 Indian Tamil-language action adventure film directed by M. A. Thirumugam, starring M. G. Ramachandran, K. R. Vijaya and Jayalalithaa. The film was produced by Sandow M. M. A. Chinnappa Thevar and released on 10 September 1965.

== Plot ==
In a military camp, captain Saravanan promises his brother-in-arms, captain Moorthy, who is dying ( he is seriously wounded following an exchange enlivened against poachers on the Indian border), to take care of his 6-year-old daughter Rani. Saravanan and Rani begin a big trip through the country, full of pitfalls. Because of his swiftness, Saravanan realises that who his daughter protects is the leader of an evil group. But they do not fall only upon ill-intentioned people, but quite the opposite, Saravanan and Rani meet on their way, Sarasu, a young woman without ties, devoid of any bad feelings, which will spare no effort, such as being the mother for Rani and will devote herself as an affectionate partner for Saravanan. Together, for the girl Rani, they go to surmount all the numerous obstacles which wait for them on the road.

== Cast ==
- M. G. Ramachandran as Captain Saravanan
- M. N. Nambiar as Rakka
- S. A. Ashokan as D. Vasu
- Nagesh as Estate manager's son
- V. K. Ramasamy as Estate manager
- Sandow M. M. A. Chinnappa Thevar as Kali
- K. R. Vijaya as Suguna
- Jayalalithaa as Sarasu
- Manorama as Rukku alias Rukkumani
- P. K. Saraswathi as Saravanan's mother
- Baby Shakila as Rani
- Chandhrakantha as Nirmala (guest appearance)

== Soundtrack ==
The soundtrack was composed by K. V. Mahadevan and all the lyrics were written by Panchu Arunachalam.

Track listing
No.	Title	Singer(s)	Length
1.	"Vaayaara Mutham"	P. Susheela	3:23
2.	"Kelamma Chinnaponnu"	T. M. Soundararajan	3:48
3.	"Ammadi Thookamma"	T. M. Soundararajan, P. Susheela	3:56
4.	"Maana Porantha"	T. M. Soundararajan, P. Susheela	4:29
5.	"Endrum Pathinaru"	T. M. Soundararajan, P. Susheela	3:34
6.	"Vazhai Vidhu Ilai"	Dharapuram Sundararajan, Manorama	3:02
Total length:			22:12

== Release and reception ==
Kanni Thai was released on 10 September 1965. The Indian Express called the story "lacklustre", its narration "mawkish" and the dialogue "gibberish". T. M. Ramachandran of Sport and Pastime wrote, "The picture has its flaws and improbable and illogical sequences but director M A Thirumugam has made the film somewhat interesting with a racy treatment and with both eyes on the box-office."
