= Poomalai =

1965 film by P. Neelakantan

- Theatrical release poster
- Directed by: P. Neelakantan
- Written by: M. Karunanidhi
- Produced by: Murasoli Maran
- Starring: S. S. Rajendran; C. R. Vijayakumari; Anjali Devi
- Cinematography: Amirtham
- Edited by: R. Devarajan
- Music by: R. Sudarsanam
- Production company: Meghala Pictures
- Distributed by: Meghala Pictures
- Release date: 23 October 1965
- Running time: 150 minutes
- Country: India
- Language: Tamil

Poomalai (pronounced [puːmaːlaɪ] transl. Garland of Flowers) is 1965 Indian Tamil-language woman's film, directed by P. Neelakantan and written by M. Karunanidhi. The film was produced by Murasoli Maran under Karunanidhi's production company Meghala Pictures, which also distributed the film. It stars S. S. Rajendran, C. R. Vijayakumari and Anjali Devi, with S. A. Ashokan, Nagesh and Manorama in supporting roles. The film focuses on the title character, a happy-go-lucky girl whose life changes for the worse when she is raped. It was released on 23 October 1965.

== Plot ==
Poomalai is a happy-go-lucky girl living with her father and elder brother. Her life changes for the worse when she is raped.

== Cast ==
- S. S. Rajendran as Sundaram
- C. R. Vijayakumari as Poomalai
- Anjali Devi as Maragatham
- Nagesh as Chittu
- Manorama as Myna
- S. A. Ashokan as Anand
- Rajasree as Nalina
- T. S. Muthaiah as Poomalai and Anand's father
- V. R. Thilakam as Leela
- M. S. Bhakkyam as Subbhamma

== Production ==
Poomalai was directed by P. Neelakantan, written by M. Karunanidhi and produced by Murasoli Maran under Meghala Pictures. Art direction was handled by B. Nagarajan, cinematography by Amirtham and editing by R. Devarajan. Karunanidhi appeared as himself onscreen, giving the film's opening monologue. Although Karunanidhi was the owner of Meghala Pictures, he was not credited as the film's producer.

== Themes ==
Historian R. Kannan said that Karunanidhi used to ingeniously weave contemporary politics into the dialogues he wrote for films, and named a dialogue in Poomalai where the sister speaks highly of her brother and threatens to shoot anyone speaking ill of him as an example.

== Soundtrack ==
The soundtrack was composed by R. Sudarsanam.

Songs	Lyricist	Singers	Length
"Badhamgeer...Rani Diamond"	Seetharaman	S. C. Krishnan, L. R. Eswari	03:53
"Kannam Kannam"	M. Karunanidhi	L. R. Eswari	03:48
"Kattai Viral"	Kumaradevan	P. Susheela	04:19
"Penne Un Gathi"	Mayavanathan	C. S. Jayaraman	03:09
"Ulagame Ethirthaalum"	Mayavanathan	C. S. Jayaraman	02:52
"Un Ennathai"	Kavi Rajagopal	T. M. Soundararajan, P. Susheela	03:45

== Release ==
Poomalai was released on 23 October 1965, during that year's Diwali day. Meghala Pictures distributed the film themselves in Madras, while other distributors did so in other districts of Tamil Nadu. According to historian Vamanan, the film landed Karunanidhi in deep debt.

== Reception ==
The Indian Express wrote on 30 October, "An otherwise loose screenplay is propped up by the beautiful dialogues by M. Karunanidhi and fine portrayals by Rajendran (the hero), R. Vijayakumari (the heroine), veteran Anjali Devi (the widowed sister of the hero) and comedian Nagesh. Neelakantan's direction is nothing to write home about, but with the material at his disposal, he has made it into a good tear-jerker, appealing to family audiences, especially women". Writing in Sport and Pastime, T. M. Ramachandran lauded the performances of Rajendran, Vijayakumari and appreciated the performances of Nagesh, Anjali Devi, Manorama, Ravi, Asokan, Muthiah and Rajsri. He added that Karunanidhi's screenplay and dialogues were the film's "saving graces", but criticised Neelakantan's direction for succumbing to "trivialities and box-office considerations". Kalki praised the film for Vijayakumari's performance and Neelakanta's direction.
