= Thazhampoo =

- Theatrical release poster
- Directed by: N. S. Ramadass
- Screenplay by: G. Balasubramaniam
- Story by: K. P. Kottarakkara
- Starring: M. G. Ramachandran; K. R. Vijaya
- Cinematography: W. R. Subba Rao
- Edited by: G. Radhakrishnan
- Music by: K. V. Mahadevan
- Production company: Sri Balamurugan Films
- Release date: 23 October 1965
- Running time: 143 minutes
- Country: India
- Language: Tamil

Thazhampoo (pronounced [taːɻambuː] transl. The Pandanus flower) is a 1965 Indian Tamil-language film directed by N. S. Ramadass. The film stars M. G. Ramachandran and K. R. Vijaya. It was released on 23 October 1965.

== Plot ==
When Kandaswamy, an accountant, goes to his employer to ask for money, he is framed for murder and imprisoned. His brother, Durai, convinced that Kandaswamy is innocent, strives to uncover the plot.

== Cast ==
- M. G. Ramachandran as Durai
- K. R. Vijaya as Kamali
- M. R. Radha as S. P. Raja Ratnam
- M. N. Nambiar as Mohan
- S. A. Ashokan as Kandhasamy
- Manimala as Bakiyum
- B. V. Radha as Kaveri
- Nagesh as Velu
- Manorama as Velu's love interest
- K. R. Ramsingh as Murugan
- M. K. Mustafa as Inspector of police
- Thirupadisamy as S. P. Somanadhan
- A. Veerappan as Kamali's car driver

== Soundtrack ==
The music was composed by K. V. Mahadevan.

| Song | Singers | Lyrics | Length |
|---|---|---|---|
| "Aerikkarai Oaraththilae" | T. M. Soundararajan, P. Susheela | Kannadasan | 03:37 |
| "Engae Poividum Kaalam" | T. M. Soundararajan | Vaali | 03:25 |
| "Pangkuni Maadhaththil" | P. Susheela | Vaali | 01:38 |
| "Thaazham Poovin" | T. M. Soundararajan, P. Susheela | Thyagarajan | 05:46 |
| "Thoo Vaanam Idhu" | T. M. Soundararajan, P. Susheela | Vaali | 03:27 |
| "Vatta Vatta Paaththi" | P. Susheela | Alangudi Somu | 04:13 |

== Release and reception ==
Thazhampoo was released on 23 October 1965, Diwali day. Writing in Sport and Pastime, T. M. Ramachandran called it "a mass entertainer with all conventional cliches". Kalki felt the film's story was polluted by meaningless dances and appreciated Vijaya's performance but felt Ashokan's acting was reminiscent of Sivaji Ganesan's and inferior.
