= Thai Sollai Thattathe =

1961 film by M. A. Thirumugam

- Theatrical release poster
- Directed by: M. A. Thirumugam
- Written by: Aaroor Dass
- Produced by: Sandow M. M. A. Chinnappa Thevar
- Starring: M. G. Ramachandran; B. Saroja Devi
- Cinematography: C. V. Murthy
- Edited by: M. A. Thirumugam; M. G. Balu Rao; M. A. Mariappan
- Music by: K. V. Mahadevan
- Production company: Thevar Films
- Release date: 7 November 1961
- Running time: 152 minutes
- Country: India
- Language: Tamil

Thai Sollai Thattathe (transl. Don't Reject Mother's Words) is a 1961 Indian Tamil-language action drama film directed by M. A. Thirumugam. The film stars M. G. Ramachandran and B. Saroja Devi, with M. R. Radha, S. A. Ashokan, V. R. Rajagopal, and P. Kannamba in supporting roles. It revolves around a police officer who is tasked with apprehending his brother, a criminal.

Thai Sollai Thattathe was produced by Sandow M. M. A. Chinnappa Thevar, and written by Aaroor Dass. The film was released on Diwali, on 7 November 1961, and was a commercial success, running for 20 weeks in theatres.

== Plot ==
Raju is an honest police inspector working hard to apprehend a group of thieves. After completing a successful mission, he is transferred to Madras to investigate a train robbery and a murder that occurred near the seashore. He crosses paths with Vijaya, the daughter of a banker named Pandithurai, and they fall in love. What happens after Raju realizes that the criminal he is hunting is none other than his brother, forms the crux of the story.

== Cast ==
- M. G. Ramachandran as Raju
- B. Saroja Devi as Vijaya
- M. R. Radha as Pandithurai alias Parangusam
- S. A. Ashokan as Mohan
- V. R. Rajagopal as Pandithurai's sidekick
- Sandow M. M. A. Chinnappa Thevar as Pandithurai's henchman
- P. Kannamba as mother of Raju and Mohan
- Senthamarai as Inspector of police
- Gemini Chandra as Rajathi

== Production ==
Thaai Sollai Thattathe was edited and directed by M. A. Thirumugam and produced by M. M. A. Chinnappa Thevar under Thevar Films. The script was written by Aaroor Dass and the cinematography handled by C. V. Murthi. The film saw Ramachandran and Thevar collaborating again after a brief misunderstanding. Production was completed in one month.

== Soundtrack ==
The music was composed by K. V. Mahadevan, with lyrics by Kannadasan. All the songs were well received, with "Kaattukulle Thiruvizha" emerging as a particularly popular number. The melody from the song 'Sirithu Sirithu' was later adapted for the Hindi song 'Koi Batade Dil Hai Kahan' in the 1962 film Main Chup Rahungi.

Song	Singers	Length
"Kaatukkulle Thiruvizha"	P. Susheela	03:04
"Oruthi Maganai"	P. Susheela	03:14
"Paattu Oru Paattu"	T. M. Soundararajan, P. Susheela	03:46
"Pattu Selai Kaathaada"	T. M. Soundararajan, P. Susheela	03:04
"Poo Uranguthu"	P. Susheela	03:24
"Poyum Poyum"	T. M. Soundararajan	03:14
"Siriththu Siriththu"	T. M. Soundararajan, P. Susheela	03:30

== Release and reception ==
Thai Sollai Thattathe was released on 7 November 1961, and ran for 20 weeks in theatres. According to R. Kannan, the author of the biography MGR: A Life, the film helped rehabilitate Ramachandran's "image as a dutiful actor". Kanthan of Kalki praised the story and some of the cast performances but criticised the music and felt the film pace should have been faster.

== Bibliography ==
- Kannan, R. (2017). MGR: A Life. India: Penguin Random House. ISBN 978-0-14-342934-0.
