= S. A. Ashokan =

Indian actor (1931–1982)

- Born: Anthony; 20 May 1931; Trichinopoly, Madras Presidency, British India (now Tiruchirappalli, Tamil Nadu, India)
- Died: 11 November 1982 (aged 51)
- Education: St. Joseph's College, Tiruchirappalli
- Occupation: Actor
- Spouse: Mary Gnanam
- Children: 2, including Vincent Asokan
- Relatives: Prameela (cousin)

S. A. Ashokan (20 May, 1931-11 November, 1982), born as Antony and often spelled Asokan, was an Indian actor who worked mainly in Tamil cinema and theatre. He was popular mainly for playing negative roles but was also a successful character actor.

== Early life ==
Ashokan was born on 20 May 1931 as Anthony in Tiruchirapalli. He showed interest in stage plays and frequently took part in oratorical and writing competitions during his childhood. He finished his B.A. degree at the St. Joseph's College, Tiruchirapalli.

== Career ==
After completing his degree, Anthony met director T. R. Ramanna, who introduced him to the film industry. Anthony changed his name to Ashokan upon Ramanna's request and maintained the same name for life. Ashokan made his acting debut in a minor role in the film Avvaiyar. He was given a positive role in the film Penn Kulathin Ponvilakku (1959) as an admirer of a woman he considers a sister. He gained the attention of the general public with the film Kappalottiya Thamizhan in 1961, where he portrayed the role of Collector Robert Ashe. Later films which featured him in the lead were, however, moderately successful. Active mostly in the 1960s and 1970s, he acted mainly in villainous roles and did character roles opposite many leading actors of those times.

Ashokan's performance as a helpless traveller who gets conned in Vallavanukku Vallavan, and as the historical Indian character Duryodhana in the mythology film Karnan were well received. He was regularly cast in supporting roles as an elder brother, father or father-in-law, or the main villain in 59 films with M. G. Ramachandran in the lead role, right from Baghdad Thirudan in 1960 to Ninaithadhai Mudippavan in 1975. Some of the popular films with MGR – S. A. Ashokan combination are Arasilangkumari, Thaai Sollai Thattadhe, Thayai Katha Thanayan, Kudumba Thalaivan, Panathottam, Koduthu Vaithaval, Dharmam Thalai Kaakkum, Periya Idathu Penn, Anandha Jodhi, Panakkara Kudumbam, Needhikkuppin Paasam, Kaanchi Thalaivan, Vettaikaaran (1964 film), Dheiva Thaai, Thozhilali, Panam Padaithavan, Kanni Thaai, Thazhampoo, Anbe Vaa, Mugaraasi, Chandhrodhayam, Thaali Bhagyam, Thanipiravi, Parakkum Paavai, Petralthan Pillaiya, Thaikku Thalaimagan, Arasa Kattalai, Kaavalkaaran (1967 film), Vivasayee, Ragasiya Police 115, Thaer Thiruvizha, Kannan En Kadhalan, Oli Vilakku, Kanavan, Kadhal Vaaganam, Adimaippenn, Nam Naadu (1969 film), Maattukara Velan, En Annan, Thalaivan (1970 film), Thedi Vandha Mappillai, Engal Thangam, Kumari Kottam, Rickshawkaran, Neerum Neruppum, Oru Thaai Makkal, Sange Muzhangu, Nalla Neram, Raman Thediya Seethai (1972 film), Ulagam Sutrum Valiban, Pattikaattu Ponnaiya, Netru Indru Naalai and Ninaithadhai Mudippavan. His performance as Professor Bhairavan in the M. G. Ramachandran-starrer Ulagam Sutrum Valiban was considered a "landmark performance". Some of his other well-known performances include the role of Soorapadman in Kandan Karunai (1967), an intriguing character role in the AVM Studios hit Veera Thirumagan, and important roles in Attukara Allamelu, Adimai Penn, Anbe Vaa, Kaanji Thalaivan, Vivasayee and Raman Thediya Seethai.

== Other work ==
Ashokan also worked as a singer in the film Iravum Pagalum for the song "Iranthavanai Somanthavanum." The film also marked actor Jaishankar's debut. He introduced filmmaker A. C. Trilokchander to AVM Studios, which helped the filmmaker make his mark. Ashokan, along with Jaishankar, and a troupe of popular artists, often toured all over Tamil Nadu to conduct cultural programs.

== Personal life ==
Ashokan was married to Mary Gnanam (originally named Saraswathi). They had two sons, including Vincent Asokan, who is also an actor.

== Filmography ==
This is a partial filmography. You can expand it.

Year	Film	Role	Notes
1953	Avvaiyar	King Chozhan	
1954	Ethir Paradhathu	Moorthi	
1954	Illara Jothi		
1955	Doctor Savithri		
1956	Rambaiyin Kaadhal	Minister	
1957	Pudhaiyal	Puthaiyal	
1958	Anbu Enge	Guest Appearance	
1958	Maya Manithan		
1959	Athisaya Penn		
1960	Vijayapuri Veeran	Nanjappan	
1960	Padikkadha Medhai	Thiyagu	
1960	Parthiban Kanavu	Chozhan King Parthiban	
1960	Kalathur Kannamma	Mayor	
1960	Paavai Vilakku		
1960	Bhaktha Sabari		
1961	Kappalottiya Thamizhan	Sub – Collector Ash	
1961	Manapanthal	Rajasekaran	
1961	Thaai Sollai Thattadhe		
1962	Kannadi Maligai	Manager Rathinam	
1962	Kudumba Thalaivan	Somu	
1962	Sarada		
1962	Paadha Kaanikkai	Maanickam	
1962	Indira En Selvam	Sekar. Dr.	
1962	Paasam		
1962	Veerathirumagan		
1962	Thaayai Kaatha Thanayan		
1963	Anandha Jodhi	Inspector Baskar	
1963	Dharmam Thalai Kaakkum		
1963	Kaanchi Thalaivan	Chalukiya King Pulikesi	
1963	Kaithiyin Kathali		
1963	Naanum Oru Penn	Guest	
1963	Ezhai Pangalan		
1963	Needhikkuppin Paasam		
1963	Koduthu Vaithaval	Manickam	
1963	Panathottam	Natarajan	
1963	Periya Idathu Penn	Sabapathy	
1963	Idhu Sathiyam		
1964	Andavan Kattalai	Manikandan	
1964	Dheiva Thaai	Karunakaran	
1964	Muradan Muthu		
1964	Panakkara Kudumbam	Muthaiah	
1964	Padagotti		
1964	Karnan	Prince Duriyodhanan	
1964	Vettaikaaran		
1964	Thozhilali	Murugappa	
1965	Iravum Pagalum	Govindhan	
1965	Karthigai Deepam	Pasubathi	
1965	Kaattu Rani		
1965	Kanni Thaai	Vasu	
1965	Panam Padaithavan		
1965	Poomalai	Anand	
1965	Vallavanukku Vallavan	Ramesh	
1965	Thaayum Magalum		
1965	Thazhampoo	Kanthasamy	
1966	Chandhrodhayam	Zamindar Ponnambalam	
1966	Iru Vallavargal		
1966	Mugaraasi	Jambu	
1966	Naan Aanaiyittal	Police Inspector Chezhiyan	
1966	Parakkum Paavai	Vidjayan	
1966	Petralthan Pillaiya	Sekhar	
1966	Ramu	Rangan	
1966	Thanipiravi	Rathnapuram	
1967	Adhey Kangal	Kamalanathan	
1967	Arasa Kattalai	Prince Vilavan	
1967	Iru Malargal	College Correspontent	
1967	Kandhan Karunai	Soora Padman	
1967	Kannan En Kadhalan	Doctor Singh	
1967	Penn Endral Penn		
1967	Sabash Thambi	Ramesh	
1967	Thaikku Thalaimagan	Somaiah	
1967	Naan		
1967	Vivasayee	Gurusamy	
1968	Andru Kanda Mugam	Advocate Aathmanathan	
1968	Kanavan	Mani	
1968	Kadhal Vaaganam	Pandjachalam	
1968	Kuzhanthaikkaga	The Police Inspector	
1968	Oli Vilakku	Master Jambhu	
1968	Ragasiya Police 115	Nambirajan	
1968	Pudhiya Bhoomi	Mayandi	
1968	Uyarndha Manithan	Doctor Gopal	
1968	Moondrezhuthu		
1968	Neelagiri Express	Bald Man	
1968	Thaer Thiruvizha	Solaimulanga/Somu	
1969	Akka Thangai		
1969	Waris		Hindi film
1969	Adimai Penn	King Sengodan	
1969	Kaaval Dheivam		
1969	Manasatchi		
1969	Nam Naadu	Aalavandar	
1970	En Annan	Dharmaraj	
1970	Engal Thangam	Banker Selvaraj	
1970	Maanavan		
1970	Maattukara Velan	Chairman Nagalingam	
1970	Kann Malar		
1970	Thalaivan	Bhairavan	
1970	Thedi Vandha Mappillai	Suresh	
1971	Kumari Kottam	Sethupathi	
1971	Rickshawkaran	Kailasam	
1971	Neerum Neruppum	The King Marthadhan	
1971	Oru Thaai Makkal	Selvanayakam	
1972	Deivam	Thief	
1972	Nalla Neram	Dharmalingam	
1972	Raman Thediya Seethai	Govindanraj	
1972	Sange Muzhangu	Nagarajan	
1972	Shakthi Leelai	Vaana Sooran	
1973	Ganga Gowri		
1973	Gayathri		
1973	Baghdad Perazhagi		
1973	Komatha En Kulamatha	Sengotan	
1973	Pattikaattu Ponnaiya	Master – wrestler Singaiya	
1973	Ponvandu	Kannan's father	
1973	Ulagam Sutrum Valiban	Scientist Bhairavan	
1974	Doctor Amma		
1974	Vairam	Thief Samy	
1974	Doctoramma		
1974	Thai Piranthal		
1974	Naan Avanillai		
1974	Netru Indru Naalai	'Perum Puli' Jambu	Also producer
1975	Ninaithadhai Mudippavan	Police Officer Jagadeesh	
1975	Pattikkaattu Raja	Tiger	
1976	Dasavatharam	The King Ravanan or Ilangeswaran	
1976	Nee Oru Maharani		
1977	Aattukara Alamelu		
1977	Palabishegam	Landlord	
1977	Olimayamana Ethirkalam		
1977	Penn Jenmam		
1977	Nallathukku Kalamillai		
1977	Gayathri	Shama Iyer	
1977	Murugan Adimai		
1978	Shri Kanchi Kamakshi	Kabaligan	
1978	Ival Oru Seethai		
1978	Thai Meethu Sathiyam		
1978	Mela Thalangal	Varadarajan	
1979	Allauddinum Albhutha Vilakkum	Bhootham	
1979	Dharma Yuddham		
1979	Annai Oru Aalayam	Hanumanthu	
1980	Billa		
1980	Murattu Kaalai		
1981	Thee		
1981	Ram Lakshman		
1981	Bala Nagamma		
1981	Savaal		
1981	Sankarlal		
1982	Krodham	Inspector Prasad	
1982	Oru Varisu Uruvagiradhu		
