= Sandow M. M. A. Chinnappa Thevar =

Indian film producer (1915–1978)

- Born: Marudhur Marudachalamurthy Ayyavoo Chinnappa Thevar; 28 June 1915; Ramanathapuram, Coimbatore, Tamil Nadu, India
- Died: 8 September 1978 (aged 63); Coimbatore, Tamil Nadu, India
- Occupation: Film producer
- Years active: 1940-1978
- Spouse: Maarimuthammal
- Children: 3

Sandow Marudur Marudachalamurthy Ayyavoo Chinnappa Thevar (28 June 1915 – 8 September 1978) was a film producer of Tamil cinema who was active from the mid-1950s to the 1970s. He is best known for his films featuring animals, and produced numerous movies with M. G. Ramachandran as lead actor (16 movies under his banner: Thevar Films).

He launched all his movies under the Devar Films, which produced the Rajesh Khanna's Bollywood hit Haathi Mere Saathi (1971) in which he achieved national fame and Dhandayupathi Films banner.

The title of "Sandow" was given to Chinnappa Thevar in tribute to the bodybuilder Eugen Sandow and because of his impressive muscles.

== Early years ==
M. M. A. Chinnappa Thevar was born in Ramanathapuram locality in Coimbatore to Ayyavoo Thevar and Ramakkal. He had one elder brother named Subbiah Thevar and three younger brothers named Nataraja Thevar, Arumugam (M. A. Thirumugam) and Mariappan. His father was an agriculturist.

Chinnappa thevar studied only till 5th grade due to financial reasons. During his youth in the 1930s, he joined in Pankaja mill for a salary of Rs.9 and started his earnings. He later worked in Stanes motor company for few years. He also earned through milk production, rice shop and soda production.

From a very young age he was interested in gymnasium. He started "Veera Maruthi Deha Payirchi saalai" with his friends in Ramanathapuram area. To join the film industry, he mastered various martial arts and improved his physique.

He and his brother first acted in the 1940 film Thilottama. It was a fight sequence where only their shadows were filmed. Devar earned the title 'Sandow' because of his physique and fighting skills.

He had started playing small roles in films that were shot in Central Studios, Coimbatore, until he was chosen by Jupiter Pictures for villain role in the 1947 movie Rajakumari with a then relatively unknown lead actor M. G. Ramachandran with whom he formed a deep friendship. In the film Mohini (1948) there was a scene taken in forest, where the character played by M.G.Ramachandran rushes to rescue a family travelling in a bullock-cart from being robbed by a gang and the main robbers role was played by M. M. A. Chinnappa Thevar as the main robber.

== Producer ==
Chinnappa thevar developed a deep friendship with M. G. Ramachandran. MGR too apparently recommended Devar in the films he worked. This went on till 1956 when Devar started his own production company Devar Films, and asked MGR to be the hero. MGR agreed, and they made Thaikkupin Thaaram. The film was a success, and launched Devar as a filmmaker.

He later moved to Chennai in the early 1950s, which by then became the South Indian Cinema Hub. He launched his production company the famous "Devar Films" and used the facilities of Vijaya Vahini Studios for indoor shooting and post production activities.

He is best known for various M. G. Ramachandran movies and introduced Saroja Devi to Tamil Movies who became a celluloid queen.

When MGR became busy with his own production Nadodi Mannan, Devar was forced to make a few other movies.

In 1960, he started to record the music for Thaai Sollai Thattadhe and cast Ashokan as the hero. When the recording was over, MGR heard the songs and wanted the story to be narrated. Apparently, after this there was a promise between them that MGR will adhere to all of Devar's conditions and, in return, Devar would make films only with him and no other 'big' hero. This 'agreement' led to Devar making 16 films with MGR, the last being Nalla Neram in 1972, the Tamil remake of Haathi Mere Saathi.

Despite working with MGR on several films, he never got a chance to work with Sivaji Ganesan. He once mentioned that he didn't have right story for Mr. Ganesan.

Devar is also known for using animals as a supporting theme in his movies, and at times as the lead character. His brother M. A. Thirumugam was also a successful director was worked predominantly for "Devar Films" production company.

Together the duo gave Rajesh Khanna's biggest blockbuster hit Haathi Mere Saathi, which also introduced the Salim–Javed duo as script writers to Bollywood.

In Tamil film industry he was one of the most successful movie producers and his two recurring subjects were his animals and devotional movies, as he was an ardent devotee of Lord Murugan.

=== Later years ===
In his later years with MGR getting more and more into active politics, Devar started to make films in the Socio –mythological Genre. They were films set in modern times with the Central theme that faith and belief in God will solve one's problems.

Chinnapa thevar also planned to make movies with Rajinikanth who was rising popular at that time. Rajini worked on the movie Thai Meethu Sathiyam under the Devar Films banner directed by Thevar's son-in-law R. Thyagarajan. While shooting for the movie, Chinnapa thevar fell ill and died couple of days later.

== Companies ==
Thevar operated two companies: Thevar Films (also spelt Devar) and Dhandayuthapani Films. Films produced by Thevar Films usually had M. G. Ramachandran starring and K. V. Mahadevan composing the music. Dhandayuthapani Films was founded to make smaller budget films that did not star Ramachandran but newcomers or less experienced actors.

== Personal life ==
Chinnapa Thevar married Mari Muthammal at an early age of 21 by 1936. The couple has one son, Dhandayuthapani, and two daughters, Subbulakshmi and Jagadeeshwari. His elder daughter Subbulakshmi married R. Thyagarajan, who became a director later. Vellikizhamai Viratham (1974) and Aattukara Alamelu(1977) are a couple of famous films to his credit.

=== Ardent Lord Murugan devotee ===
Chinnapa Thevar practiced Hindu religion and was an ardent devotee for Lord Muruga. Once Income Tax officials raided his house and was astonished to find so many Viboothi packets of Murugan temples, but no cash. Any profit from the movie he splits into four parts. The first part was given to Murugan temples as he believed that all of his success was because of Lord Muruga. Because of this many Murugan temples like Pazhani temple, Tiruchendur temple and Marudhamalai temple were benefited. The second part he kept for himself. The third part is for his old friends who supported him during his early days who collected few thousands and sent him to Madras for film making. The fourth and final part he gave to the needy people.

== Death ==
On 6 September 1978, during the shooting of the film Thai Meethu Sathiyam at Ooty, Devar complained of chest pain, since he had high blood pressure he was advised by the doctors in Ooty to get admitted in hospital, he was soon brought in his car from Ooty to Coimbatore. He was admitted in a private hospital upon arrival. After treatment he recovered partially, but again got chest pain on 8 September 1978 and died by 10 a.m morning in spite of intense treatment. He was 63 when he died.

The day of his demise was a 'Shashti' day, very special to Lord Muruga.

=== Tribute and cremation ===
Thevar's body was brought from hospital to his Ramanathapuram, Coimbatore residence and kept for public to pay their last respect. M.G.R, who had a long-term association with Thevar not only paid rich tribute to Chinnapa Thevar but also came to Coimbatore for his funeral. Several eminent personalities like Rajinikanth Jaishankar attended Thevar's funeral.

== Filmography ==
Films produced by Thevar

Year	Film	Language	Company	Notes	Ref
1956	Thaikkupin Tharam	Tamil	First Film under Devar Films banner First Film with MGR		
1957	Neelamalai Thirudan	Tamil			
1958	Sengottai Singam	Tamil			
1959	Vaazha Vaitha Deivam	Tamil			
1960	Uthami Petra Rathinam	Tamil	Presented by Devar Films; Produced by Amara Productions		
1960	Yanai Paagan	Tamil			
1961	Kongunattu Thangam	Tamil			
1961	Thaai Sollai Thattadhe	Tamil	Re-join with MGR		
1962	Thayai Katha Thanayan	Tamil			
1962	Kudumba Thalaivan	Tamil			
1963	Dharmam Thalai Kaakkum	Tamil			
1963	Needhikkuppin Paasam	Tamil			
1964	Vettaikaaran	Tamil			
1964	Deiva Thirumagal	Tamil	First Film under Dhandayuthapani Films banner First and Last Film directed by Sandow M. M. A. Chinnappa Thevar		
1964	Thozhilali	Tamil			
1965	Kattu Rani	Tamil	Under Dhandayuthapani Films banner		
1965	Thaayum Magalum	Tamil	Under Dhandayuthapani Films banner		
1965	Kanni Thaai	Tamil			
1966	Mugaraasi	Tamil	Under Thevar Films banner; acted in the role of Sangili		
1966	Thanipiravi	Tamil			
1967	Thaikku Thalaimagan	Tamil	story credits as well; acted in a cameo		
1967	Magaraasi	Tamil	Under Dhandayuthapani Films banner		
1967	Deivacheyal	Tamil	Under Dhandayuthapani Films banner		
1967	Vivasayee	Tamil	story credits as well; acted in the role of Madasamy		
1968	Thaer Thiruvizha	Tamil			
1968	Nervazhi	Tamil	Under Dhandayuthapani Films banner		
1968	Kadhal Vaaganam	Tamil			
1969	Akka Thangai	Tamil	Under Dhandayuthapani Films banner		
1969	Thunaivan	Tamil	Under Dhandayuthapani Films banner		
1970	Penn Deivam	Tamil	Under Dhandayuthapani Films banner		
1970	Maanavan	Tamil	Under Dhandayuthapani Films banner		
1971	Haathi Mere Saathi	Hindi	First Hindi Film; Highest Gross of the Year		
1971	Kettikaran	Tamil	Under Dhandayuthapani Films banner		
1972	Nalla Neram	Tamil	Remake of Haathi Mere Saathi; Last Film with MGR		
1972	Jaanwar Aur Insaan	Hindi	Under Dhandayuthapani Films banner		
1972	Dheivam	Tamil	Under Dhandayuthapani Films banner		
1973	Komatha En Kulamatha	Tamil	Under Dhandayuthapani Films banner		
1973	Gaai Aur Gori	Hindi	Remake of Komatha En Kulamatha; Under Dhandayuthapani Films banner		
1974	Vellikizhamai Viratham	Tamil	Under Dhandayuthapani Films banner		
1974	Shubh Din	Hindi	Remake of Vellikizhamai Viratham; Under Dhandayuthapani Films banner		
1975	Raaja	Hindi			
1975	Thiruvarul	Tamil	Under Dhandayuthapani Films banner		
1976	Thayilla Kuzhandhai	Tamil	Under Dhandayuthapani Films banner		
1976	Maa	Hindi			
1977	Sorgam Naragam	Tamil	Remake of Swargam Narakam; Under Dhandayuthapani Films banner		
1977	Aattukara Alamelu	Tamil	Under Dhandayuthapani Films banner		
1978	Pottelu Punnamma	Telugu	Remake of Aattukara Alamelu; First Telugu Film		
1978	Mera Rakshak	Hindi	Remake of Aattukara Alamelu	25th Film	
1978	Thai Meethu Sathiyam	Tamil	Under Dhandayuthapani Films banner		

Films produced after the death of Thevar [By his Son-in-law Sri. R. Thyagarjan B.Sc]

Year	Film	Language	Company	Notes	Ref
1979	Thaayillamal Naan Illai	Tamil			
1979	Annai Oru Aalayam	Tamil			
1980	Do Aur Do Paanch	Hindi			
1980	Bangaru Lakshmi	Telugu	Remade in Tamil as Selvi		
1980	Anbukku Naan Adimai	Tamil			
1981	Main Aur Mera Haathi	Hindi			
1981	Ram Lakshman	Tamil			
1981	Anjatha Nenjangal	Tamil			
1982	Ranga	Tamil			
1982	Adhisayappiravigal	Tamil			
1983	Thai Veedu	Tamil			
1983	Jeet Hamaari	Hindi	Remake of Thai Veedu		
1983	Apoorva Sahodarigal	Tamil			
1983	"Sashti viratham"	Tamil			
1984	Nalla Naal	Tamil			
1985	Anthasthu	Tamil			
1985	Annai Bhoomi 3D	Tamil	First 3D Tamil Film		
1985	Bewafai	Hindi	Under Dhandayuthapani Films banner Last Hindi Film		
1985	Panam Pathum Seyyum	Tamil	Under Dhandayuthapani Films banner		
1985	Selvi	Tamil	Under Dhandayuthapani Films banner Remake of Telugu film Bangaru Lakshmi	25th Film	
1986	Dharmam	Tamil			
1986	Piranthaen Valarnthaen	Tamil	Under Dhandayuthapani Films banner		
1987	Chellakutti	Tamil	Under Dhandayuthapani Films banner		
1988	Sigappu Thali	Tamil	under Lakshmi Raja Films banner		
1988	Dharmathin Thalaivan	Tamil	Under Dhandayuthapani Films banner Last Film for this banner.		
