= M. A. Thirumugam =

Indian film director (d. 2004)

Maradhur Ayyavoo Arumugam Thirumugam (born Maradhur Ayyavoo Arumugam Thirumugam Thevar) (1918-2004) was an Indian film director and editor. He was the younger brother of the film producer Sandow M. M. A. Chinnappa Thevar.

He was born in 1918 to director Ayyavoo Thevar and actress Ramakkal. His maternal grandfather Maradhur was a stage actor. He had 4 brothers named Subbiah Thevar, Sandow M. M. A. Chinnappa Thevar, Nataraja Thevar, and Mariappan Thevar. The whole family was in cinema. His cousin was Puzhu Kalaimamma Nagalingam Thevar, commonly known as P. K. Raja Sandow. Arumugam’s wife was Iyer Vadivambal, the younger sister of M. S. Subbulakshmi.

== Filmography ==
=== As editor ===
- Kaithi (1951)
- Marmayogi (1951)
- Rani (1952)
- Edhir Paradhathu (1954)
- Manohara (film) (1954)
- Vettaikaran (1964)
- Haathi Mere Saathi (1971)
- Maa (1976)

=== As director ===
- Thaikkupin Tharam (1956)
- Neelamalai Thirudan (1957)
- Pillai Kaniyamudhu (1958)
- Uzhavukkum Thozhilukkum Vandhanai Seivom (1959)
- Vaazha Vaitha Deivam (1959); also co-editor
- Uthami Petra Rathinam (1960)
- Yanai Paagan (1960)
- Kongunattu Thangam (1961)
- Thaai Sollai Thattadhe (1961)
- Thayai Katha Thanayan (1962)
- Kudumba Thalaivan (1962)
- Dharmam Thalai Kaakkum (1963)
- Needhikkuppin Paasam (1963)
- Vettaikaran (1964)
- Thozhilali (1964)
- Kaattu Rani (1965)
- Thaayum Magalum (1965)
- Kanni Thai (1965)
- Mugaraasi (1966); also co-editor
- Thanippiravi (1966)
- Magaraasi (1967)
- Thaikku Thalaimagan (1967)
- Vivasayi (1967)
- Ther Thiruvizha (1968)
- Kadhal Vaaganam (1968)
- Akka Thangai (1969)
- Thunaivan (1969)
- Penn Deivam (1970)
- Maanavan (1970)
- Haathi Mere Saathi (1971)*
- Nalla Neram (1972)
- Dheivam (1972)
- Komatha En Kulamatha (1973)
- Gaai Aur Gori (1973)*
- Maa (1976)*
- Dharma Raja (1980)
- Ellam Un Kairasi (1980)
- Nadhi Ondru Karai Moondru (1981)

Those marked * are Hindi films, others Tamil.

== Bibliography ==
- "Director M. A. Thirumugam". Archived from the original on 1 April 2017.
