= V. K. Ramasamy (actor) =

Indian actor, comedian and film producer

- Born: Virudhunagar Kanthan Ramasamy; 1 January 1926; Virudhunagar, Madras Presidency, British India (now Tamil Nadu, India)
- Died: 24 December 2002 (aged 76); Chennai, Tamil Nadu, India
- Occupations: Actor, Comedian, Film producer
- Years active: 1947–2002
- Spouse: Ramani Ammal
- Children: 7
- Parent(s): Father : Kanthan Chettiyar; Mother : Angammal

Virudhunagar Kanthan Ramasamy (1 January 1926 – 24 December 2002) better known as VKR was an Indian actor, comedian and film producer who was known for his versatility in various character roles, he played in Tamil films from 1947 to 2001.

== Biography ==
V. K. Ramasamy was born in Amaravilaa, Madras State, now Tamil Nadu on 1 January 1926 to Kanthan Chettiyar and Angammal. The veteran character actor and comedian, was interested in acting since childhood joined Bala Gana Sabha of Ponnusamy Pillai. Ramasamy shot into prominence when, at the age of 21, he donned the role of a 60-year-old father of grown-up sons in Naam Iruvar (1947), first film of the AVM Films. "VKR" as the actor became known, did not look back since then. However, he always got to play only an elderly person throughout his career, which spanned over five decades in which he acted in over 500 films. In the 1960s and 1970s, Ramasamy acted with almost all leading actors including T. R. Mahalingam, M. G. Ramachandran, Sivaji Ganesan, Gemini Ganesan, Jai Shankar, Ravichandran, Muthuraman, Kamal Haasan and Rajinikanth.

Kamal Haasan mentioned veteran V. K. Ramasamy as one of the important persons (/ inspiration) in his life among 60 persons of his (Kamalhaasan) 60 year cinema career. He showed V. K. Ramasamy's image (along with those of the other 59 important persons of his life, including Sivaji Ganesan, Gemini Ganesan, Rajnikanth, Nagesh and his guru K.Balachander) in Kamal Haasan's 60th year function ("Ungal Naan" function) at 17 November 2019, Nehru Auditorium, Chennai.

Rajinikanth has shared the profit of Arunachalam with eight producers as Guru Dhatchanai. V.K. Ramasamy was one of the producers of that movie and benefited from the profit share.

Both Kamal Haasan and Rajinikanth showed their respect and love of the most senior actor of the film industry Mr.V.K.Ramasamy. Also Malayalam director Fazil has collaborated with V.K.Ramasamy in his Tamil movies such as Poove Poochooda Vaa, Arangetra Velai, Varusham Padhinaaru. Comedy actor Dr.Charle mentioned V.K.Ramasamy as his mentor in many interviews and stages, also submitted a chapter in his thesis about the V.K.Ramasamy's contribution of humor in Tamil cinema.

Ramasamy was known for his dialogue delivery, especially as a villain or comedian. He was at ease playing any role and paired with the veteran comedienne, Manorama, to play some memorable roles in Tamil films. Peers always respected his old world values of discipline on the sets. In the later part of his career, Ramasamy produced over 15 films. Among his last films was Dumm Dumm Dumm, that represents the fourth generation of Tamil cinema.

== Personal life ==
Ramasamy was married to Ramani and had two sons R. Raghu and Ravikumar. Raghu is a director who made films like Vigneshwar and Katta Panchayathu.

== Death ==
Ramasamy died on 24 December 2002, after a brief illness. He was 76. The end came in the morning a day after VKR was discharged from the hospital, where he had been admitted for a variety of complaints including hypertension, diabetes and cardiac problems.

== Partial filmography ==
=== Actor ===
He acted in many number of films with Tamil film heroes playing the roles of comedian and supporting characters.

Year	Film	Role	Notes
1947	Nam Iruvar	Shanmugam Pillai	
1950	Digambara Samiyar	Velayudha Pillai	
1951	Singari		
1952	Chinna Durai	Raja Sri Krishnan	
1952	Parasakthi	Narayana Pillai	
1952	Panam	N S Krishnan	
1953	Azhagi		
1956	Vazhvile Oru Naal	Vazhavanthan	
1957	Iru Sagodharigal	Subbaiah Pillai	
1959	Vaazha Vaitha Deivam		
1959	Nalla Idathu Sammandham	Muthu's father	
1959	Ulagam Sirikkirathu		
1959	Veerapandiya Kattabomman	Ettayappan	
1960	Ponni Thirunaal		
1960	Sangilithevan		
1961	Yar Manamagan?		
1961	Panam Panthiyile		
1962	Kudumba Thalaivan	Chellappa	
1962	Bandha Pasam	Chithra's father	
1963	Dharmam Thalai Kaakkum	Kandhasamy	
1963	Annai Illam	Ramanathan	
1963	Karpagam	accountant	
1963	Paar Magaley Paar	Ramasamy	
1964	Muradan Muthu	Chettiyar	
1964	Pudhiya Paravai	Ramadurai	
1965	Neela Vaanam	Varatharajan	
1965	Kanni Thai	Estate manager	
1965	Ennathan Mudivu		
1965	Thaayum Magalum		
1966	Madras to Pondicherry	street magician	
1966	Nadodi	Dharmalingam	
1966	Muharasi	Singaram (Constable #777)	
1966	Mahakavi Kalidas	Konar	
1966	Chinnanchiru Ulagam		
1967	Kaavalkaaran	Vaithilingham	
1967	Pattanathil Bhootham	Thangavel	
1967	Penn Endral Penn		
1967	Ooty Varai Uravu	Dharmalingam	
1967	Vivasayee	Chokki's father, a pawnbroker	
1968	En Thambi	Bharma Singaram	
1968	Kudiyirundha Koyil	Jaya's father Rav Bagavadhor Singaram	
1968	Deiveega Uravu		
1968	Lakshmi Kalyanam	Eagambaram	
1968	Delhi Mapillai	Lord Shiva	
1969	Kanne Pappa	Chinna Durai	
1969	Anbalippu	Neelamegam Pillai	
1969	Ponnu Mappillai	Ekambaram	
1969	Kuzhandai Ullam		
1969	Nirai Kudam	Appadurai	
1969	Aayiram Poi	Chinna Durai	
1970	Enga Mama	Chettiyar	
1970	Mattukkara Velan	Sattanathan	
1970	Veettuku Veedu	Paranthaman	
1971	Kumari Kottam	Somu	
1971	Veguli Penn	Bhoopathy Raja	
1971	Sabatham	Rangaiah	
1971	Babu	Singaram Pillai	
1972	Kurathi Magan		
1972	Dhikku Theriyadha Kaattil	Constable	
1972	Raman Thediya Seethai	Siva Shankar	
1972	Vasantha Maligai	Ananth's home butler	
1972	Sange Muzhangu	Varagaswamy	
1972	Pattikada Pattanama	Sokkalingam	
1972	Pillaiyo Pillai		
1973	Rajapart Rangadurai	Drama teacher	
1973	Baghdad Perazhagi	Mama	
1973	Sontham		
1973	Vayadi		
1973	Anbu Sagodharargal		
1973	Pookkari	Shyamala's father	
1973	Manipayal	Ponnambalam	
1973	Jesus	Saint Peter	Malayalam film
1974	Urimaikural	Kozhaidhar Pulai	
1974	En Magan	Erodareya	
1974	Netru Indru Naalai	Nallasivam	
1974	Thanga Pathakkam	Gopalsamy	
1975	Pattampoochi	Vedhasalam	
1975	Swami Ayyappan		Malayalam film
1975	Cinema Paithiyam	Sivalingam	
1976	Mayor Meenakshi		
1976	Rojavin Raja	Kadapparai Murugesan	
1977	Ilaya Thalaimurai	Vanisri's father	
1977	Meenava Nanban	Nagaraj	
1977	Avar Enakke Sontham		
1978	Rudhra Thaandavam	Lord Shiva	
1979	Inikkum Ilamai		
1979	Allavudeenum Arputha Vilakkum		
1979	Kalyanaraman	Samypillai	
1981	Tik Tik Tik	Sharada's father	
1981	Raja Paarvai	Sulochana's father	
1982	Auto Raja	Servant	
1983	Thoongathey Thambi Thoongathey		
1983	Paayum Puli		
1984	Jappanil Kalyanaraman	Samikannu	
1984	Unnai Naan Santhithen	Sabapathy	
1984	Nallavanukku Nallavan	Sadhasivam	
1984	Enakkul Oruvan	Ulaganath	
1984	Naan Mahaan Alla	Dhanakodi	
1985	Naagam	guest appearance	
1985	Deivapiravi		
1985	Uyarndha Ullam	Nagapillai	
1985	Un_Kannil_Neer_Vazhinthal...	Perumal	
1985	Poove Poochudava	Viswanathan	
1985	Aan Paavam	Ramasamy Annan	
1986	Vikram	Minister	
1986	Mouna Ragam	Chandrakumar's boss	
1986	Nambinar Keduvathillai		
1986	Oru Iniya Udhayam	Jithu	
1987	Rettai Vaal Kuruvi	Maarka Bandhu	
1987	Velaikkaaran	Valayapathy	
1987	Ayitham	Periyaswamy	Malayalam film
1987	Veerapandiyan	Dharmakartha of Manimangalam temple	
1988	Agni Natchathiram	Chettiar	
1988	Therkathi Kallan	Advocate	
1988	Unnal Mudiyum Thambi	Politician	
1988	Poo Pootha Nandavanam		
1988	Dharmathin Thalaivan	Rangarajan	
1989	Varusham Padhinaaru	Chinna thatha	
1989	En Purushanthaan Enakku Mattumthaan	Vatsala's father	
1989	Varusham 16	Sundaramoorthy	
1989	Pudhea Paadhai		
1990	Arangetra Velai	Nambi Anna	
1990	Pattanamthan Pogalamadi		
1990	Athisaya Piravi	Chitra Gupta	
1990	Anjali	Umapathi	
1990	Ooru Vittu Ooru Vanthu	groom's father	
1990	En Kadhal Kanmani	Hema's father	
1991	Vasanthakala Paravai	Uma's grandfather	
1991	Gopura Vasalile	Kalyani's father	
1991	Pondatti Pondattithan	Inspector Rajendran	
1992	Mannan	Kushboo's Father	
1993	Maharasan	Paramasivan	
1994	Pondattiye Deivam	Pattabi's boss	
1995	Aanazhagan		
1997	Minsaara Kanavu	Guru's uncle	
1997	Arunachalam	Kaliaperumal	
1997	Kalyana Vaibhogam	Shanthi's grandfather	
2001	Dumm Dumm Dumm	Ganga's grandfather	
2002	Kadhal Azhivathillai	Old man on the opening scene	

=== Director ===
- Jodippura (1983)
