= List of Tamil films of 1959 =

B Post-amendment to the Tamil Nadu Entertainments Tax Act 1939 on 1 April 1958, Gross jumped to 140 per cent of Nett Commercial Taxes Department disclosed ₹1.81 crore in entertainment tax revenue for the year.

The following is a list of films produced in the Tamil film industry in India in 1959, in alphabetical order.

== 1959 ==
Title	Director	Production	Music	Cast	Release date (D-M-Y)
Abalai Anjugam	R. M. Krishnaswamy	Aruna Films	K. V. Mahadevan	T. R. Mahalingam, Sowcar Janaki, M. N. Rajam, N. S. K. Madhuram	31-10-1959
Alli Petra Pillai	K. Somu	M. M. Production	K. V. Mahadevan	S. S. Rajendran, Pandari Bai, M. N. Rajam, S. V. Sahasranamam, A. Karunanidhi, V. K. Ramasamy, K. Sarangapani,	31-07-1959
Amudhavalli	A. K. Sekar	Jupiter Pictures	Viswanathan–Ramamoorthy	T. R. Mahalingam, M. N. Rajam, R. Nagendra Rao, Tambaram Lalitha, R. Balasubramaniam	27-11-1959
Annaiyum Pidhavum Munnari Deivam; Telugu Panduranga Mahatyam			T. V. Raju	N. T. Rama Rao, Anjali Devi, V. Nagayya	
Arumai Magal Abirami	V. Krishnan	Aravind Pictures	V. Dakshinamoorthy	Prem Nazir, Rajasulochana, S. V. Sahasranamam, Rajeshwari	29-11-1959
Athisaya Penn	M. V. Raman	Raman Productions	S. M. Subbaiah Naidu	A. Nageswara Rao, Vyjayanthimala, R. S. Manohar, E. V. Saroja, Madhuri Devi, K. Sarangapani, K. N. Kamlam, S. A. Asokan, M. S. Throwpathi, Javert Seetharaman, K. S. Angamuthu, S. G Eswar	06-03-1959
Aval Yaar Pathi Gouravame Satikanamdam (Telugu Dubbed-1962)	K. J. Mahadevan	Sudarsanam Pictures	S. Rajeswara Rao	Sivaji Ganesan, Pandari Bai, Sowcar Janaki, S. V. Ranga Rao, S. V. Sahasranamam, Malini, N. R. Sandhya, K. R. Chellam, T. K. Ramachandran, T. R. Ramachandran, Chalam	30-10-1959
Azhagarmalai Kalvan	Kemparaj Urs	Kempraj Productions	B.Gopalam	K. Balaji, Malini, C. R. Vijayakumari	04-12-1959
Bhaaga Pirivinai	A. Bhimsingh	Saravana Films	Viswanathan–Ramamoorthy	Sivaji Ganesan, M. R. Radha, B. Sarojadevi, M. N. Nambiar, T. S. Balaiah, S. V. Subbaiah, M. V. Rajamma, C. K. Saraswathi, K. M. Nambirajan, S. Ramarao, Tambaram Lalitha	31-10-1959
Bhagya Devathai	Tapi Chanakya	Sri Sarathi Studios	Master Venu	Gemini Ganesan, Savitri, V. Nagayya	12-06-1959
Circus Sundari; Dubbed from Hindi	Noshir Engineer		M. S. Ranga Rao	Nadia, John Cawas, Nilofer, Samar Roy	
Deiva Balam	P. Vasanth Kumar	S. B. S. Pictures	Ashwathama	K. Balaji, Jayasri, Padmini Priyadarshini	02-10-1959
Deivame Thunai	Ch. Narayanamurthi	S. P. S. Pictures	S. M. Subbaiah Naidu	A. Nageswara Rao, Padmini, K. A. Thangavelu	31-10-1959
Engal Kuladevi	A. Subba Rao	Modern Theatres	K. V. Mahadevan	K. Balaji, Pandaribai, Mynavathi, S. N. Lakshmi, A. Karunanidhi, Javar Seetharaman	04-12-1959
Jaya Veeran (Dubbed from Telugu)	B. Vittalaacharya	Vittal Productions		Kantha Rao, Krishna Kumari, Mukkamala, Rajanala, Ramadevi, Swarnalatha, Balakrishna, Allu Ramalingaiha	
Kalaivaanan	P. Pullaiah	Saradha Films	Pendyala Nageswara Rao	A. Nageswara Rao, Anjali Devi, S. V. Ranga Rao, V. Nagayya, K.A. Thangavelu, Santha Kumari, S. V. Sahasranamam, C. T. Rajakantham, Rajasulochana, T. P. Muthulakshmi, Raghunath Panigrahi, K. Sarangapani, Jayakodi K. Nadarajan, V. M. Ezhumalai, T. V. Sethuraman, C. P. Kittaan	09-04-1959
Kalyana Parisu	C. V. Sridhar	Venus Pictures	A. M. Rajah	Gemini Ganesan, B. Saroja Devi, C. R. Vijaykumari, K. A. Thangavelu, M. Saroja, S. D. Subbulakshmi, A. Nageswara Rao, M. N. Nambiar	09-04-1959
Kalyana Penn (Dubbed from Telugu)	D. Yoganand		Ghantasala	Akkineni Nageswara Rao, Anjali Devi, B. Saroja Devi,	
Kalyanikku Kalyanam	A. S. A. Sami	Manohar Pictures	G. Ramanathan	S. S. Rajendran, Mynavathi, Pandari Bai, V. Nagayya	23-04-1959
Kan Thiranthathu	K. V. Srinivasan	Narayanan & Company	T. R. Rajagopal	Ramanathan, Mynavathi, Master Viyas, S. V. Sahasranamam, T. A. Madhuram, A. Karunanidhi	31-10-1959
Kaveriyin Kanavan	A. K. Velan	Arunachalam Studios	K. V. Mahadevan	Muthu Krishnan, Sowcar Janaki, Pakkirisami, Suryakala	27-09-1959
Koodi Vazhnthal Kodi Nanmai	D. S. Rajagopalan	Narasu Productions	T. Chalapathi Rao	S. S. Rajendran, B. Saroja Devi, K. Balaji, Prem Nazir	14-02-1959
Madhavi		MAV Pictures	K. V. Mahadevan	R. S. Manohar, Sowcar Janaki	09-04-1959
Mala Oru Mangala Vilakku	S. Mukerjee	Radhakrishna Films	C. N. Pandurangan	V. Nagayya, N. N. Kannappa, Maduridevi	27-03-1959
Mamiyar Mechina Marumagal	Krishnan–Panju	AVM Productions	R. Sudarsanam	S. S. Rajendran, M. N. Rajam, G. Varalakshmi	10-01-1959
Manaiviye Manithanin Manickam	K. Vembu	K. M. T. V. N. Productions	S. Hanumantha Rao	K. Balaji, Pandari Bai, C. R. Vijayakumari, V. Nagayya, K. A. Thangavelu, M. Saroja, Nagesh	31-07-1959
Manimekalai	V. S. Raghavan	Sekar Art Film Enterprises	G. Ramanathan	T. R. Mahalingam, P. Bhanumathi, N. S. Krishnan, T. A. Madhuram, Kaka Radhakrishnan, Serukalathur Sama, O. A. K. Thevar, C. S. Pandiyan, Sandhya, G. Sakunthala, T. V. Kumudhini	09-04-1959
Manjal Mahimai	A. Subba Rao	Annapurna Pictures	Master Venu	A. Nageswara Rao, Savitri, K. A. Thangavelu, Rajasulochana, P. Kannamba, S. V. Ranga Rao, G. Varalakshmi, M. S. Sundari Bai	14-01-1959
Maragatham	S. M. Sriramulu Naidu	Pakshiraja Studios	S. M. Subbaiah Naidu	Sivaji Ganesan, Padmini, S. Balachander, Sandhya, J. P. Chandra Babu, T. S. Balaiah, T. S. Durairaj, O. A. K. Thevar, P. S. Gnanam, T. P. Muthulakshmi, C. Lakshmi Rajyam, Lakshmi Prabha, M. R. Santhanam, Ennatha Kannaiya	21-08-1959
Minnal Veeran	Jampana	T. N. R. Productions	veda	Ranjan, Vanaja, Sandhya, Veerappa, Muttulakshmi	20-03-1959
Naalu Veli Nilam	Muktha Srinivasan	Saevaa Screens	K. V. Mahadevan	S. V. Sahasranamam, Pandari Bai, R. Muthuraman, Mynavathi, Devika, Kula Dheivam V. R. Rajagopal	02-09-1959
Naan Sollum Ragasiyam	P. Sridhar Rao	Kasthuri Films	G. Ramanathan	Sivaji Ganesan, Anjali Devi, M. N. Rajam, K. A. Thangavelu, J. P. Chandrababu, S. V. Subbaiah, S. R. Dhasarathan, K. M Nambirajan, S. Rama Rao, Nalli Subbaiah, Dharmarajan, G. Mani, M. N. Rajam, G. Sakunthala, C. K. Saraswathi, Manorama, Kumari Rukmani	07-03-1959
Naatukoru Nallaval	K. Dasaratha Ramaiah	Majestic Pictures	Master Venu	S. S. Rajendran, C. R. Vijayakumari, S. V. Sahasranamam, Pandari Bai, T. S. Balaiah	17-07-1959
Nalla Theerpu	T. Prakash Rao	Sri Productions	S. M. Subbaiah Naidu	Gemini Ganesan, P. Kannamba, Jamuna, Ragini, M. N. Rajam, V. Nagayya, T. R. Ramachandran, M. G. Chakrapani, S. V. Sahasranamam	09-04-1959
Naradar Kalyanam; Dubbed from Telugu	C. S. Rao	Sri Raja Rajeswari Films	M. Ranga Rao	Akkineni Nageswara Rao, Jamuna, Rajanala, Raghu Ramaiah, Suryakantham, Suryakala, E. V. Saroja (Dance)	
Odi Vilaiyaadu Paapa	V. Srinivasan	Jagajothi Films	V. Krishnamurthy	S. S. Rajendran, B. Saroja Devi	25-09-1959
Orey Vazhi	K. Shankar	Vasu Films	R. Govardhan	Prem Nazir, M. N. Rajam, T. S. Balaiah, Sriranjani, Tambaram Lalitha	06-03-1959
Panchaali	V. Srinivasan	M. A. V. Pictures	K. V. Mahadevan	R. S. Manohar, Devika	31-10-1959
Pandithevan	K. Subramanyam	Morak Pvt Limited	C. N. Pandurangan	T. K. Balachandran, B. S. Saroja, S. A. Ashokan, T. K. Bhagavathi, M. G. Chakrapani, Rajasulochana, Ragini	07-03-1959
Paththarai Maathu Thangam	K.S. Mani	Manivel Pictures	G. Govindarajulu Naidu	N. N. Kannappa, Pandari Bai, T. R. Ramachandran, T. S. Balaiah, M. S. Sundari Bai	22-05-1959
Penn Kulathin Pon Vilakku	B. Vittalacharya	Asoka Pictures	Master Venu	Gemini Ganesan, M. N. Rajam, M. N. Nambiar, P. V. Narasimha Bharathi, Sriranjani	10-07-1959
Ponnu Vilayum Bhoomi	A. Bhimsingh	Oriental Movies	K. H. Reddy	Gemini Ganesan, Padmini, T. S. Balaiah, J. P. Chandrababu, D. Balasubramaniam, S. V. Subbaiah, Ragini, Sukumari, K. S. Angamuthu, A. Ramarao	14-01-1959
President Panchaksharam	A. Bhimsingh	Savithri Pictures	G. Ramanathan	S. S. Rajendran, B. Saroja Devi, S. V. Sahasranamam, T. R. Ramachandran	10-07-1959
Pudhumai Penn	M. Thiruvengadam	Sri Gajalakshmi Pictures	T. G. Lingappa	S. S. Rajendran, Rajasulochana, M. N. Rajam, T. S. Balaiah	26-06-1959
Raja Malaya Simha	B. S. Ranga	Vikram Production	Viswanathan–Ramamoorthy	Ranjan, Rajasulochana, Sowcar Janaki	06-03-1959
Raja Sevai	K. Kameswara Rao	Swasthi Sri Pictures	T. V. Raju	N. T. Rama Rao, Sowcar Janaki, T. R. Ramachandran, Girija	02-10-1959
Sabash Ramu (dubbed from Telugu)	C. S. Rao	Saradha Films	Ghantasala	N. T. Rama Rao, Devika, Relangi, Girija	04-09-1959
Sahodhari	A. Bhimsingh	AVM Productions	R. Sudarsanam	K. Balaji, Rajasulochana, Prem Nazir, Devika, J. P. Chandrababu, R. Muthuraman	11-12-1959
Sivagangai Seemai	K. Shankar	G. K. Productions	Viswanathan–Ramamoorthy	S. S. Rajendran, S. Varalakshmi, Kumari Kamala, M. N. Rajam, T. K. Baghavathy, D. V. Narayanasamy, Tambaram Lalitha, M. K. Mustafa, Raja Wahab Kashmiri, K. M. Nambirajan, Valaiyapathi G. Muthukrishnan	19-05-1959
Sollu Thambi Sollu	T. V. Sundaram	T. V. S. Production	K. V. Mahadevan	S. S. Rajendran, Mynavathi, R. S. Manohar	27-03-1959
Sumangali	M. K. R. Nambiar	Rajeswari Films	M. Ranga Rao	K. Balaji, E. V. Saroja	14-01-1959
Thaai Magalukku Kattiya Thaali	R. R. Chandiran	Kalpana Kala Mandir	T. R. Pappa	M. G. Ramachandran, Jamuna, Rajasulochana, P. Kannamba, K. A. Thangavelu, O. A. K. Thevar, E. R. Sahadevan, M. G. Chakrapani, Kaka Radhakrishnan, R. Balasubramaniam, D. Balasubramaniam, V. Gopalakrishnan	31-12-1959
Thalai Koduthaan Thambi	T. R. Sundaram	Modern Theatres	Viswanathan–Ramamoorthy	S. S. Rajendran, K. R. Ramasamy, Malini, Tambaram Lalitha, R. S. Manohar, T. P. Muthulakshmi	07-08-1959
Thamarai Kulam	V. Srinivasan	Kalyani Pictures	H. Padmanabha Sarma and T. A. Mothi	M. R. Radha, Sowcar Janaki, Prem Nazir, S. N. Lakshmi	14-04-1959
Thanga Padhumai	A. S. A. Sami	Jupiter Pictures	Viswanathan–Ramamoorthy	Sivaji Ganesan, Padmini, T. R. Rajakumari, M. N. Rajam, M. N. Nambiar, N. S. Krishnan, Kula Dheivam V. R. Rajagopal, T. P. Muthulakshmi	10-01-1959
Thayapola Pillai Noolapola Selai	K. Somu	Sri Lakshmi Pictures	K. V. Mahadevan	Prem Nazir, V. K. Ramasamy, Devika	14-04-1959
Ulagam Sirikkiradhu	R. Ramamurthy	Prabu Films	S. Dakshinamurthy	M. R. Radha, Prem Nazir, Sowcar Janaki, R. Muthuraman	02-10-1959
Uzhavukkum Thozhilukkum Vandhanai Seivom	M. A. Thirumugam	Lalitha kala Films	K. V. Mahadevan	Prem Nazir, Rajasulochana	26-06-1959
Vannakili	T. R. Raghunath	Modern Theatres	K. V. Mahadevan	R. S. Manohar, Prem Nazir, B. S. Saroja, Mynavathi, T. R. Ramachandran, D. Balasubramaniam, R. M. Sethupathi, T. P. Muthulakshmi, S. Rama Rao, M. Saroja, C. T. Rajakantham, C. K. Saraswathi, K. K. Soundar, M. M. Jayasakthivel, C. K. Soundirarajan, Baby Uma	04-09-1959
Vaazha Vaitha Deivam	M. A. Thirumugam	Devar Films	K. V. Mahadevan	Gemini Ganesan, B. Saroja Devi, T. S. Balaiah, S. V. Subbaiah, Kula Dheivam V. R. Rajagopal, T. S. Muthaiah, Sandow M. M. A. Chinnappa Thevar, Raja Bahadhoor, P. Kannamba, G. Sakunthala, K. Malathi, T. P. Muthulakshmi	28-08-1959
Vaazhkai Oppandham	K. V. Reddy	Jayanthi Production	Ghantasala	A. Nageswara Rao, Jamuna, Rajasulochana, S. V. Ranga Rao, R. Nageswara Rao	04-09-1959
Veerapandiya Kattabomman	B. R. Panthulu	Padmini Pictures	G. Ramanathan	Sivaji Ganesan, Gemini Ganesan, S. Varalakshmi, Padmini, O. A. K. Thevar, Ragini, V. K. Ramasamy, Javar Seetharaman, M. R. Santhanam, A. Karunanidhi, S. A. Kannan, C. R. Parthiban, Baby Kanchana	16-05-1959
Vinayaga Chathurthi; Dubbed from Telugu	Samudrala Sr.	Revathi Studios	Ghantasala	Nandamuri Taraka Rama Rao, Krishna Kumari, Jamuna, A. Prakasa Rao, Gummadi, Rajanala Nageswara Rao, Suryakala, Rajanala Kaleswara Rao, Balakrishna	
Yaanai Valartha Vanampadi	P. Subramaniam	Neela Productions	Brother Lakshmanan	Prem Nawas, Ambika, Thikkurissy Sukumaran Nair, Bahadoor, Friend Ramaswamy, M. N. Nambiar, Miss Kumari, S. D. Subbulakshmi, S. P. Pillai, K. V. Shanthi, Sriram	27-11-1959
