= Kangal (film) =

1953 film by Krishnan–Panju

- Theatrical release poster
- Directed by: Krishnan–Panju
- Written by: N. V. Rajamani
- Starring: Sivaji Ganesan; Pandari Bai; S. V. Sahasranamam
- Cinematography: R. R. Chandiran
- Edited by: Devarasan
- Music by: G. Ramanathan; S. V. Venkatraman
- Production company: Motion Pictures Team
- Distributed by: R. P. Pictures
- Release date: 5 November 1953
- Country: India
- Language: Tamil

Kangal (English: Eyes) is a 1953 Indian Tamil language film, directed by Krishnan–Panju. The film stars Sivaji Ganesan, Pandari Bai and S. V. Sahasranamam. It was released on 5 November 1953.

== Plot ==
A doctor husband wants to make his wife go blind by putting drops that would harm her eyes making her believe that it would improve her eyesight. The purpose is to marry his wife's sister.

== Cast ==
- Sivaji Ganesan
- Pandari Bai
- S. V. Sahasranamam
- Mynavathi
- V. K. Ramasamy
- M. N. Rajam
- J. P. Chandrababu
- C. T. Rajakantham
- T. S. Jaya

== Soundtrack ==
The music was composed by G. Ramanathan and S. V. Venkatraman.

Song	Singers	Lyrics	Length
"Aalu Ganam Aanaal Moolai Gaali"	J. P. Chandrababu	Kambadasan	02:35
"Inba Veenaiyai Meetudhu"	M. L. Vasanthakumari		03:08
"Kann Kanda Deivame"	M. L. Vasanthakumari		03:21
"Annai Karamena Nammai"	M. L. Vasanthakumari	Kambadasan	04:43
"Varungkaala Thalaivan Neeye"	M. L. Vasanthakumari	Kambadasan	02:56
"Kaadhalaagi Kasindhu .. Aadi Paadi Dhinam"	Jikki		03:14
"Pongi Malarudhe Mangaiyin"	K. Rani & G. Kasthoori		04:51
"Koodu Sellum Paravaigale"	Jikki and group		03:23
"Sinna Penne Vaadi"	S. V. Venkatraman & group		
"Muthu Siripudane Mana Moham"			
"Sathiyame Thavaraamale"	S. V. Venkatraman	Kambadasan	
