= Maaman Magal =

Maaman Magal (lit. 'Uncle's Daughter' or 'Niece' in Tamil) may refer to these Indian films:

- Maaman Magal (1955 film), by R. S. Mani starring Gemini Ganesan, K. Savithri and J. P. Chandrababu
- Maaman Magal (1995 film), by Guru Dhanapal starring Sathyaraj, Meena and Goundamani
