= Mangalya Bhagyam =

- Theatrical release poster
- Directed by: T. R. Raghunath
- Written by: Sa. Ayya Pillai
- Produced by: Lena Chettiar
- Starring: K. Balaji; Ragini; T. K. Ramachandran; Kusalakumari; T. S. Balaiah
- Cinematography: V. Sampath; M. A. Rehman
- Edited by: V. P. Natarajan
- Music by: G. Ramanathan
- Production company: Krishna Pictures
- Distributed by: Subbu
- Release date: 10 November 1958
- Running time: 3 hrs 4 mins=
- Country: India
- Language: Tamil

Mangalya Bhagyam is a 1958 Indian Tamil-language film directed by T. R. Raghunath and produced by Lena Chettiar. The film stars K. Balaji and Ragini. It was released on 10 November 1958.

== Cast ==
The following list was adapted from the database of Film News Anandan.

Male cast

- K. Balaji
- T. S. Balaiah
- T. K. Ramachandran
- O. A. K. Thevar
- K. A. Thangavelu

Female cast

- Ragini
- T. D. Kusalakumari
- Padmini
- M. Saroja
- M. N. Rajam

Dance

- Sayee-Subbulakshmi

== Production ==
The film was produced by Lakshmanan, popularly known as Lena Chettiar under his own banner Krishna Pictures and was directed by T. R. Raghunath. The screenplay and dialogues were written by Ayya Pillai. Sampath and Rahuman handled the Cinematography while the editing was done by V. P. Natarajan. Angamuthu was in charge of art direction. Choreography was done by Chinni-Sampath and Stunt was handled by R. N. Nambiar. The film was shot at Vauhini and Neptune studios.

== Soundtrack ==
Music was composed by G. Ramanathan.
The song "Nenjaththile Acham Illadhavar" was composed in a rare Carnatic raga called Bushavali, a janya (derivative) of the melakarta raga Vachaspathi (the 64th mela).

Song	Singer/s	Lyricist	Length
"Paadupattaale Machaan"	A. P. Komala, K. Jamuna Rani & A. G. Rathnamala	Thanjai N. Ramaiah Dass	05:08
"Kannodu Kann Kalandhaal"	Sirkazhi Govindarajan & P. Susheela	Thanjai N. Ramaiah Dass	06:06
"Imaya Malaiyai Idadhu Kaiyaal"	K. Jamuna Rani & A. G. Rathnamala	Thanjai N. Ramaiah Dass	06:21
"Annaiye Paraasakthi"	M. L. Vasanthakumari	Thanjai N. Ramaiah Dass	01:39
"Anusooya Kadhaakaalatchebam" * "Akkaamaargale Pennkalukkellaam" * "Hari Hari Mugundhaa Parandhaamaa" * "Appadiyaa Naam Avalai" * "Dhevarukkulle Sirandha Moovarukkum" * "Bahathi Bikshaandhehi" * "Manjal Kayitrin Maangalyame" * "Sakthi Thiru Vani Konda" * "Mangalya Pichchaiyammaa"	* K. Jamuna Rani, A. P. Komala & A. G. Rathnamala * Sirkazhi Govindarajan, * K. Jamuna Rani, A. P. Komala & A. G. Rathnamala * K. Jamuna Rani, A. P. Komala & A. G. Rathnamala * Sirkazhi Govindarajan * M. L. Vasanthakumari * M. L. Vasanthakumari * K. Jamuna Rani, A. P. Komala & A. G. Rathnamala	Thanjai N. Ramaiah Dass	09:51 * 02:09 * 00:47 * 00:19 * 00:39 * 00:11 * 01:48 * 01:38 * 02:30
"Maayamaagiya Jaalam Thanile"	K. Jamuna Rani	Udumalai Narayana Kavi	05:52
"Onre Maandhar Kulam"	Sirkazhi Govindarajan, K. Jamuna Rani & A. G. Rathnamala	Udumalai Narayana Kavi	03:03
"Kanne Sella Thaaraa"	S. C. Krishnan & P. Leela	Udumalai Narayana Kavi	03:22
"Ennaanga Ungalaithaanga"	Sirkazhi Govindarajan & P. Leela	Udumalai Narayana Kavi	03:05
"Nenjathile Achcham"	M. L. Vasanthakumari & P. Leela	Kannadasan	05:08
