= Kumara Raja (1961 film) =

- Theatrical release poster
- Directed by: G. K. Ramu
- Screenplay by: Murasoli Maran
- Produced by: K. Muniratnam
- Starring: J. P. Chandrababu; T. S. Balaiah; M. N. Rajam; Suryakala
- Cinematography: G. K. Ramu
- Music by: T. R. Pappa
- Production company: Sivakami Pictures
- Release date: 21 April 1961
- Country: India
- Language: Tamil

Kumara Raja (transl. Prince) is a 1961 Indian Tamil-language film directed by G. K. Ramu. The film stars J. P. Chandrababu, T. S. Balaiah and M. N. Rajam. It was released on 21 April 1961.

== Plot ==
A wealthy man (T. S. Balaiah) has a son (J. P. Chandrababu) who spends his money and time singing and dancing with girls. The father tries to marry him to a modest girl (M. N. Rajam) but the son spends most of his time with his girlfriend (Suryakala). How the son is brought back to normal life forms the rest of the story.

== Cast ==
The list was adapted from Thiraikalanjiyam — Part 2

- J. P. Chandrababu
- T. S. Balaiah
- T. S. Durairaj
- Javar Seetharaman
- Kallapart Natarajan
- Nambirajan
- M. N. Krishnan
- M. N. Rajam
- Suryakala
- P. S. Gnanam
- C. T. Rajakantham
- Kowsalya
- Master Gopi

== Production ==
J. P. Chandrababu, who was playing mostly comedian roles was cast in the main role. At a time when bigger stars like M. G. Ramachandran and Sivaji Ganesan were paid salaries ranging from ₹50,000 (equivalent to ₹4.4 million or US$46,000 in 2023)—₹60,000 (equivalent to ₹5.3 million or US$55,000 in 2023), Chandrababu received ₹100,000 (equivalent to ₹8.8 million or US$92,000 in 2023) for this film. The film was in production as early as 1960.

== Soundtrack ==
Music was composed by T. R. Pappa while the lyrics were penned by Pattukkottai Kalyanasundaram, A. Maruthakasi, Thanjai N. Ramaiah Dass and K. D. Santhanam.

Song	Singer/s	Lyricist	Duration
"Yettil Padithathodu Irundhuvidaathe"	P. Leela	Pattukkottai Kalyanasundaram	03:12
"Kandaleh Podhum, Kadhal Vandhu Modhum"	K. Jamuna Rani & Group	Pattukkottai Kalyanasundaram	
"Manamagalaaga Varum Mangai Evalo"	V. N. Sundaram	Pattukkottai Kalyanasundaram	02:54
"Naan Vandhu Serndha Idam Nalla Idam"	V. N. Sundaram & P. Leela	Pattukkottai Kalyanasundaram	03:50
"Ennai Paartha Kannu Veru Pennai Parkuma"	J. P. Chandrababu & K. Jamuna Rani	Pattukkottai Kalyanasundaram	
"Moodinaalum Thiranthaalum"	J. P. Chandrababu & K. Jamuna Rani	K. D. Santhanam	
"Onnume Puriyalae Ulagathile"	J. P. Chandrababu	K. D. Santhanam	03:20
"Aanundu Paada, Pennundu Aada"	J. P. Chandrababu & P. Leela	K. D. Santhanam	03:00
"Angadikadai Veedhiyile"	Soolamangalam Rajalakshmi & A. G. Rathnamala	Thanjai Ramaiah Dass	
"Kannalagi Bhama, Enmunne Vaamma"	K. Jamuna Rani	A. Maruthakasi	

== Reception ==
Kanthan of Kalki wrote that when the producers themselves did not care about the script, why should the viewer care about it.
