= Nalla Thangal =

1955 Indian Tamil film

- Directed by: P. V. Krishna Iyer
- Written by: A. K. Velan
- Starring: R. S. Manohar; G. Varalakshmi; A. P. Nagarajan; Madhuri Devi; J. P. Chandrababu
- Cinematography: Vasudeva Rao; Karnataki
- Edited by: Paul G. Yadav
- Music by: G. Ramanathan
- Production company: Madras Movietone
- Release date: 30 December 1955
- Country: India
- Language: Tamil

Nalla Thangal (transl. Good Younger Sister) is a 1955 Indian Tamil-language film directed by P. V. Krishna Iyer. The film stars R. S. Manohar and G. Varalakshmi. It is a remake of the director's own Malayalam film Nalla Thanka (1950).

== Cast ==
The list is adapted from the database of Film News Anandan.

- R. S. Manohar
- G. Varalakshmi
- A. P. Nagarajan
- Madhuri Devi
- J. P. Chandrababu
- V. M. Ezhumalai
- E. V. Saroja
- Mohana

== Soundtrack ==
Music was composed by G. Ramanathan.

Song	Singer(s)	Lyricist	Duration (m:ss)
"Kannin Karumaniye"	Sirkazhi Govindarajan & P. Leela		03:40
"Evale Avale"	N. L. Ganasaraswathi		04:40
"Vaadaatha Marikozhundhe"	D. B. Ramachandra & K. Jamuna Rani		02.50
"Pachai Padagu Virithadhu Pol"	K. Jamuna Rani, Udutha Sarojini & Nirmala		02:02
"Ithanai Naalaaga Engedi Pone"	G. Ramanathan & K. Jamuna Rani		02:09
"Komala Sezhunthaamarai Ezhil Meviye"	P. Leela, A. P. Komala, A. G. Rathnamala, Udutha Sarojini & Nirmala	A. Maruthakasi	02:37
"Ponne Pudhu Malare"	T. M. Soundararajan	A. Maruthakasi	03:30
"Kallamilla Vellai Manam Kaattum"	T. M. Soundararajan		01:32
"Unai Kandu Mayangaadha"	J. P. Chandrababu		01:18
"Thiru Ullam Irangaadha"	Sirkazhi Govindarajan	A. Maruthakasi	02:20
"Adi Seeni Sakkara Katti"	V. T. Rajagopalan		
"Annaiyum Thandhaiyum Illaadha"	P. Leela	A. Maruthakasi	03:31
"Thingalodu Gangaiyai"	P. Leela	A. Maruthakasi	01:58
"Komala Sezhunthaamarai Ezhil Meviye" (Pathos)	P. Leela	A. Maruthakasi	02:37
