= Naan Sollum Ragasiyam =

- Poster
- Directed by: P. Sridhar Rao
- Written by: Kalaipithan
- Produced by: V. C. Subburaman
- Starring: Sivaji Ganesan; Anjali Devi
- Cinematography: T. V. Balasundaram
- Edited by: P. V. Manickam
- Music by: G. Ramanathan
- Production company: Kasturi Films
- Release date: 7 March 1959
- Country: India
- Language: Tamil

Naan Sollum Ragasiyam (transl. The Secret I Tell) is a 1959 Indian Tamil-language film, directed by P. Sridhar Rao and produced by V. C. Subburaman. The film stars Sivaji Ganesan and Anjali Devi. It was released on 7 March 1959.

== Plot ==
Vadivelu is a rich man without a human heart. His eldest son Karunakaran is a humane and philanthropic man. His younger son Ravi is an innocent. His adopted niece Leela likes modernity. One night, Karunakaran takes a sleeping pill given by Dr. Shylock and leaves home.

A mill worker, Velayudham, lives in a hut with his motherless daughter Manorama. One day, Manorama brings Muthu, a rickshaw puller, to take Velayudham to the doctor. After that, Muthu starts visiting their house frequently.

Karunakaran, who leaves home, returns home dressed as a rickshaw puller. When everyone says he is a thief, he goes out again. Ravi and Leela are married under the arrangement of Dr. Shylock. After the wedding, Leela changes her mind from modernity.

The rickshaw puller returns home at the request of Vadivelu. At the same time, Manorama came to that house as a maid. When Manorama came to know that the rickshaw puller Muthu was actually the son of the wealthy Vadivelu, she ran away from home. Karunakaran also ran after her.

Meanwhile, Velayudham decides to get Manorama and Muthu married. At the same time, a new person comes and tells Vadivelu a secret. Due to this, the wedding that was supposed to happen does not take place.

The rest of the film tells what that secret is and whether the wedding took place later.

== Cast ==
- Sivaji Ganesan as Karunakaran
- Anjali Devi as Manorama
- K. A. Thangavelu as Vadivelu
- J. P. Chandrababu as Doctor Shailak
- S. V. Subbaiah as Velayutham
- S. R. Dhasarathan as Ravi
- K. M Nambirajan as Govindan
- Rama Rao as the patient
- Nalli Subbiah as Kuppusami
- Dharmarajan as the drunkard
- G. Mani as Somu
- M. N. Rajam as Leela
- G. Sakunthala as Rosy
- C. K. Saraswathi as Akilandam
- Manorama as Kamakshi
- N. Rukmani as Kuppusami's wife

Dance

Helen

== Soundtrack ==
The music composed by G. Ramanathan. All lyrics were by A. Maruthakasi.

Song	Singers	Length
"Kaanadha Sorgam Ondru"	A. M. Raja, P. Susheela	03:15
"Naan Sollum Ragasiyam"	T. M. Soundararajan	01:52
"Kandene Unnai Kannaale"	P. B. Sreenivas, P. Susheela	03:08
"Parkkaadha Pudhumaigal"	P. Leela	04:54
"Pollaatha Ulagathile"	T. M. Soundararajan	03:11
"Vilaiyadu Raja Vilaiyadu"	J. P. Chandrababu, A. P. Komala	03:24
"Thaaye Idhu Nyaayamaa"	P. Susheela	01:33
"Kannai Pol Thannai Kaakkum"	Jikki	03:04
"Maanamum izhandhe vaazhvadhum"	Sirkazhi Govindarajan	02:22

== Release ==
Naan Sollum Ragasiyam was released on 7 March 1959, delayed from 27 February. Kanthan of Kalki said the secret of the film might be its failure.
