= Aan Pillai Singam =

1975 film by S. P. Muthuraman

- Theatrical release poster
- Directed by: S. P. Muthuraman
- Produced by: Ramachandran
- Starring: Sivakumar; Sripriya; Sujatha; M. N. Rajam
- Cinematography: Babu
- Edited by: R. Vittal
- Music by: Vijaya Bhaskar
- Production company: Arun Chandra Combines
- Release date: 19 September 1975
- Running time: 105 minutes
- Country: India
- Language: Tamil

Aan Pillai Singam (transl. Male lion cub) is a 1975 Indian Tamil-language film, directed by S. P. Muthuraman and produced by Ramachandran. The film stars Sivakumar, Sripriya, Sujatha and M. N. Rajam. It was released on 19 September 1975.

== Cast ==
- Sivakumar as Ashok
- Sripriya as Sivakumar's Pair
- Sujatha as Rajam's servant
- M. N. Rajam
- Cho as Rajam's 1st Son
- Fatafat Jayalakshmi Cho's wife
- Suruli Rajan
- Senthamarai as Rajam's Husband
- Vijayakumar as Sujatha's Husband
- S. A. Ashokan
- Typist Gopu

== Soundtrack ==
The music was composed by Vijaya Bhaskar.

Song	Singers
"Kannadi Kaiyadi"	P. Susheela
"Mayakkam Kuzhappam"	P. Susheela
"Kalam Pala Kaathirundhom"	P. Susheela
"Seerthuko Kasu"	Vani Jairam

== Reception ==
Kanthan of Kalki criticised the story, but praised Muthuraman's direction.
