= Aandavan Kattalai (1964 film) =

1964 film directed by K. Shankar

- Film poster
- Directed by: K. Shankar
- Screenplay by: Javar Seetharaman
- Story by: K. P. Kottarakkara
- Produced by: P. S. Veerappa
- Starring: Sivaji Ganesan; Devika
- Cinematography: Thambu
- Edited by: K. Narayanan
- Music by: Viswanathan–Ramamoorthy
- Production company: P. S. V. Pictures
- Release date: 12 June 1964
- Running time: 157 minutes
- Country: India
- Language: Tamil

Aandavan Kattalai (transl. God's command) is a 1964 Indian Tamil-language film directed by K. Shankar and produced by P. S. Veerappa. The film stars Sivaji Ganesan and Devika, with J. P. Chandrababu, K. Balaji, S. A. Ashokan, A. V. M. Rajan and Pushpalatha in supporting roles. It was released on 12 June 1964. The film is loosely based on the 1930 German film The Blue Angel.

== Plot ==
Professor Krishnan is a role model; honest and austere, he is a staunch follower of Swami Vivekananda. His principle in life is "Duty First". He is a perfectionist to the extent where people correct their clocks based on his schedule. He considers marriage as an hindrance and women as diversion. His only aim is to take care of his mother and get his niece, Gomathi, married. He "adopts" Ramu, an orphan, as a brother and helps educate him. Gomathi and Ramu fall in love. Radha, a student, seduces Krishnan in a slow and steady manner and their affair turns out to cause his doom.

Radha is presumed dead in an accident and the blame falls on Krishnan which causes his mother to die and him to go through a lengthy and scandalous trial. He is declared innocent as Radha's body is never found but the society which respected him has now shunned him. He attempts suicide but a dog he once rescued saves him, dying in the process. He takes this as a message and decides to dedicate his new life, given by the dog, in service of others taking up the name of Moorthy.

Radha, meanwhile, has lost her memory and is in care of Sankar who intends to marry her. Gomathi too has become destitute. Moorthy joins work in Sankar's quarry, meets Gomathi, gets her married to Ramu while keeping away from Radha believing that she manipulated the whole situation to ruin him unaware of her amnesia. In the end, all confusions get cleared with Radha and Moorthy getting married.

== Cast ==
- Sivaji Ganesan as Professor Krishnan / Moorthy
- Devika as Radha
- A. V. M. Rajan as Ramu
- Pushpalatha as Gomathi
- P. S. Veerappa as Lawyer (guest appearance)
- S. A. Ashokan as Manikandan
- K. Balaji as Sankar
- J. P. Chandrababu as Chitti Babu
- Javar Seetharaman as the Principal (cameo appearance)
- V. Nagayya as Doctor (cameo appearance)
- M. S. Sundari Bai as Radha's mother
- Seethalakshmi as Krishnan's mother
- Karikol Raju as Perumal
- K. Natarajan as Climax Judge
- Thayir Vadai Desikan as Chitti Babu's friend

== Soundtrack ==
Music was composed by Viswanathan–Ramamoorthy, with lyrics by Kannadasan. The song "Aarumaname Aaru" is set to Sindhu Bhairavi raga, and "Amaithiyaana Nathiyinile" is set to Harikambhoji.The song "Aaru Maname Aaru" incorporates ideas from eight Thirukkural couplets into a single lyric.

Song	Singers	Length
"Azhage Vaa"	P. Susheela	04:56
"Amaithiyaana Nathiyinile"	T. M. Soundararajan, P. Susheela	04:46
"Amaithiyaana Nathiyinile" (sad)	T. M. Soundararajan, P. Susheela	03:01
"Aaru Maname Aaru"	T. M. Soundararajan	04:55
"Kannirandum Minnaminna"	P. B. Sreenivas, L. R. Eswari	03:29
"Sirippu Varuthu"	Chandrababu	03:34

== Release and reception ==
Aandavan Kattalai was released on 12 June 1964. In Sport and Pastime, T. M. Ramachandran wrote, "Screenplaywright Javar Seetharaman, cameraman Thambu and director K. Shankar appear to have jointly worked hard and contributed their talent in turning Aandavan Kattalai into a good movie, but they have compromised a great deal to make it a money-spinner. They are capable of better work and, if they had carefully attended to all the details, they would have perhaps made Aandavan Kattalai a very notable film". Kanthan of Kalki praised Thambu's cinematography and called the film yet another winner from P. S. V. Pictures. The film's successful run at Paragon theatre, Madras ended on its 70th day to accommodate the release of Puthiya Paravai.
