= Mohana Sundaram =

- Theatrical release poster
- Directed by: A. T. Krishnaswamy
- Screenplay by: A. T. Krishnaswamy
- Based on: Mohana Sundaram by J. R. Rangaraju
- Produced by: T. R. Mahalingam
- Starring: T. R. Mahalingam; S. Varalakshmi
- Cinematography: A. Shanmugam
- Edited by: T. M. Lal
- Music by: T. G. Lingappa
- Production company: Sree Sukumar Productions
- Distributed by: M. S. Pictures
- Release date: 21 July 1951
- Running time: 171 minutes
- Country: India
- Language: Tamil

Mohana Sundaram is a 1951 Indian Tamil-language crime thriller film written and directed by A. T. Krishnaswamy. An adaptation of J. R. Rangaraju's detective novel of the same name, the film stars T. R. Mahalingam and S. Varalakshmi. It was released on 21 July 1951, and became an average success.

== Cast ==
Male

- T. R. Mahalingam as Bhoopathi
- B. R. Panthulu as Sundara Mudaliar
- K. Sarangapani as Subbanna
- V. K. Ramasamy as Mohana Mudaliar
- T. K. Ramachandran as Seetharaman
- V. K. Karthikeyan as Gopalasami
- K. Sayeeram as Bhima Rao
- K. S. Hariharan as Balu Mudaliar
- K. Natarajan as Detective Govindan
- N. Thiruvenkatam as Sub Inspector
- C. V. V. Panthulu as Ramadas
- Chandra Babu as Gopu
- Kottapuli Jayaraman as Constable
- Muthu Ramalingam, Bhairavan, Mani, Govindan,
  and Master Subramanyam.

Female

- S. Varalakshmi as Visalakshi (Pappa)
- V. Susheela as Leelavathi
- S. K. Venu Bai as Jagathambal
- S. R. Lakshmi as Singaram
- G. Sakunthala as Maragatham
- Saraswathi as Leelavathi's Mother
- K. S. Angamuthu as Lakshmi
- Krishnaveni, Rajeswari, Gnanakumari,
  Saraswathi, Prabha, and Meera.

Dance

- Kumari Kamala

== Soundtrack ==
The soundtrack was composed by T. G. Lingappa and the lyrics were written by K. D. Santhanam. The westernised song "Hello My Dear Darling", which contained many English words, attracted considerable attention.

Songs	Singers	Length
"Oh Jagamathil Inbam"	T. R. Mahalingam S. Varalakshmi	02:17
"Oh Jagamathil Inbam" – Female	S. Varalakshmi	
"Pattu Venuma Oru Paattu"	T. R. Mahalingam	03:02
"Oyillana Mayilattam"	P. Leela & K. Rani	03:51
"Pulli Maanai Pole"	T. R. Mahalingam, S. Varalakshmi	02:10
"Kanneer Thaano En"	T. R. Mahalingam, S. Varalakshmi	03:55
"Ninaivellam Neeya"	T. R. Mahalingam	
"Avar Thaane En"	S. Varalakshmi	
"Venmugil Kaana"	S. Varalakshmi	02:45
"Kannana Kanmani"	T. R. Mahalingam	03:47
"Inbam Pongum"	Chandra Babu Jikki	02:57
