= Nadodi Mannan =

1958 film by M. G. Ramachandran

- Theatrical release poster
- Directed by: M. G. Ramachandran
- Screenplay by: C. Kuppusami; K. Srinivasan; P. Neelakantan
- Story by: R. M. Veerappan; Ve. Lakshmanan; S. K. T. Sami
- Produced by: M. G. Ramachandran; M. G. Chakrapani; R. M. Veerappan
- Starring: M. G. Ramachandran; P. S. Veerappa; M. N. Nambiar; P. Bhanumathi; M. N. Rajam; B. Saroja Devi
- Cinematography: G. K. Ramu
- Edited by: K. Perumal; C. P. Jambulingam
- Music by: S. M. Subbaiah Naidu; N. S. Balakrishnan
- Production company: Em.Gee.Yar Pictures
- Release date: 22 August 1958
- Running time: 220 – 226 minutes (Note: While Ashish Rajadhyaksha and Paul Willemen state the runtime is 220 minutes, Film News Anandan gives the film's runtime as 226 minutes.)
- Country: India
- Language: Tamil
- Budget: ₹18 lakh
- Box office: ₹1.1 crore

Nadodi Mannan (transl. The Vagabond and the King) (Note: According to politician and biographer S. Jagathrakshakan, the title Nadodi Mannan, while literally meaning "Vagabond King", also refers to the vagabond and king separately.) is a 1958 Indian Tamil-language action adventure film directed by M. G. Ramachandran in his debut as a filmmaker. He stars in dual roles alongside P. Bhanumathi, M. N. Rajam and B. Saroja Devi. P. S. Veerappa, M. N. Nambiar, M. G. Chakrapani, T. K. Balachandran and Chandrababu play supporting roles. The film revolves around a king being replaced by a look-alike after getting abducted on the eve of his coronation. The look-alike begins to implement social and economic reforms to uplift the poor which irks the kingdom's high priest, who has kidnapped the very person the look-alike resembles. The rest of the film shows how the look-alike saves the man he impersonates and defeats the high priest.

Made on a budget of ₹18 lakh, Ramachandran co-produced the film with Chakrapani and R. M. Veerappan under the banner of Em.Gee.Yar Pictures. C. Kuppusami, K. Srinivasan, and P. Neelakantan were in charge of the screenplay. Kannadasan and Ravindar undertook the responsibility of writing the dialogues. The cinematography was handled by G. K. Ramu while K. Perumal and C. P. Jambulingam did the editing. S. M. Subbaiah Naidu and N. S. Balakrishnan composed the film's soundtrack and score. Songs from the soundtrack like "Thoongathey Thambi Thoongathey", "Thadukkathey", "Summa Kedandha", and "Senthamizhe" became popular hits.

Filmed in both black and white as well as Gevacolor, Nadodi Mannan was released on 22 August 1958 and garnered positive critical reception. It was a commercial success, grossing ₹1.1 crore in its lifetime, thereby becoming only the second Tamil film to earn ₹1 crore after another Ramachandran starrer Madurai Veeran (1956); it became a silver jubilee film. Nadodi Mannan acquired cult status in Tamil cinema, and became a turning point for Ramachandran in terms of both his acting and political career.

== Plot ==
The kingdom of Ratnapuri is besieged by food shortages and high unemployment. Since the king's only daughter Ratna is missing and the king dies without naming a successor, Marthandan, a member of the royal family, is chosen by a majority of the imperial council of Ratnapuri to be its new ruler. However, the kingdom's Rajaguru (high priest) Vijayavarman plans to kill Marthandan and make Pingalan, Marthandan's cousin, king. Meanwhile, Veerabahu, a loyal bodyguard of the late king, and his men, including his son Bhupathi and daughter Madhana, are not pleased to see Marthandan as a king and are equally saddened by the situation of Ratnapuri's people.

Violent protests erupt all over the kingdom led by Veerangan, Marthandan's look-alike, with the support of his friend Sagayam. The protestors march to the palace condemning the monarchy and demanding democracy. Veerangan is imprisoned for his actions in Naganathapuram, a nearby town. Madhana is also incarcerated in the same prison on a similar charge. They are pardoned and released on the occasion of Marthandan's coronation. They travel together to Ratnapuri. Sharing the same ideals and revolutionary thoughts, they fall in love.

In the meantime, Marthandan arrives at Ratnapuri. Vijayavarman asks him to stay in an isolated palace on the outskirts and tells him that he should not meet his wife Manohari until the coronation, as the current moment is inauspicious. On entering a hotel in Ratnapuri, Veerangan and Sagayam beat up a gang of rowdies. Hired by Vijayavarman, they mistake Veerangan for Marthandan. Veerangan is chased by palace guards and ends up in Marthandan's room. Marthandan and Veerangan meet face to face. Veerangan tells him of the pathetic state of the people of Ratnapuri, and Marthandan agrees to set everything right as soon as he takes charge.

On the eve of the coronation, Vijayavarman arranges for Marthandan to be poisoned. He carries out his plan with the help of Karmegam, a royal advisor. Marthandan swoons after drinking a few sips of the poisoned beverage, but is soon saved by Veerangan and Ratnapuri's commander-in-chief. However, Marthandan is still unconscious and incapacitated. The commander-in-chief, and one of the ministers, persuade Veerangan to take Marthandan's place to ensure that the coronation takes place as scheduled. A reluctant Veerangan agrees to do so in the interests of the state, and arrives just in time for the coronation. It takes place smoothly and Veerangan, as Marthandan, becomes Ratnapuri's new king. Vijayavarman and Pingalan are taken aback and send men to investigate. They find the unconscious Marthandan and kidnap him.

Veerangan now finds himself saddled with the role of a king for more days than he had initially bargained for because of Marthandan's sudden disappearance. He does not let this setback deter him and puts the opportunity to good use by beginning many reforms, and enacting several measures to uplift the poor. These steps are supported by the people while causing a political upheaval among the elite. However, he is troubled by the fact that he is deceiving Manohari who believes him to be Marthandan. Unable to keep it a secret from her, he tells her the truth. Perceiving his noble character, Manohari accepts him as her brother. Madhana is killed by Pingalan, and a grief-stricken Veerangan vows to avenge her death. He discovers through Veerabahu that both Marthandan and Ratna have been kidnapped and held in custody on an island named Kanni Theevu.

Veerangan sails to Kanni Theevu and comes across Ratna, who falls in love with him; he reciprocates her feelings. Pingalan and Karmegam arrive there only to find that the island's chieftain is none other than Vijayavarman, who has kidnapped Ratna after she was born. Vijayavarman plans to marry Ratna himself, get rid of Pingalan, and declare himself the ruler of Ratnapuri. Pingalan decides to take Ratna back and make himself king legally by marrying her. Ratna does not approve of it. Pingalan takes her away by force. Veerangan saves her from Pingalan's clutches. The duo then frees Marthandan and Karmegam, who had been captured by Vijayavarman and is now reformed. Both Marthandan and Veerangan defeat Vijayavarman. Veerangan marries Ratna, and Marthandan issues a proclamation stating that Ratnapuri is a democracy.

== Cast ==
Male actors

- M. G. Ramachandran as Marthandan and Veerangan
- P. S. Veerappa as Vijayavarman
- M. N. Nambiar as Pingalan
- M. G. Chakrapani as Karmegam
- T. K. Balachandran as Bhupathi
- Chandrababu as Sagayam
- K. R. Ramsingh as Veerabahu

Female actors

- P. Bhanumathi as Madhana
- M. N. Rajam as Manohari
- B. Saroja Devi as Ratna
- G. Sakunthala as Nandini
- T. P. Muthulakshmi as Nagamma
- K. S. Angamuthu as Pappa

== Production ==
=== Development ===
After the release of Naam (1953), M. G. Ramachandran and his brother M. G. Chakrapani, who were its co-producers and shareholders, were keen to make a film under their own production banner. Hence, they established Em.Gee.Yar Pictures and hired M. Karunanidhi to draft a script for their company's debut film titled Vidivelli. The film was shelved after Karunanidhi was imprisoned for participating in the Kallakudi demonstration in July 1953. Ramachandran and Chakrapani then dissolved Em.Gee.Yar Pictures and established the Em.Gee.Yar drama troupe instead, but the idea of producing a film was still on Ramachandran's mind.

Ramachandran had dreamt of making his own film ever since he attended a screening of Frank Lloyd's historical drama, If I Were King (1938) starring Ronald Colman, in Calcutta. This occurred while he was playing a minor role in Maya Machhindra (1939). He wished to make a film that would express his political views and interests to the people of Tamil Nadu. To this end, he assembled a team of three people: R. M. Veerappan, V. Lakshmanan and S. K. T. Sami. He gave them suggestions about the outline of the story and urged them to watch If I Were King and two other films: The Prisoner of Zenda (1937), another Colman film, and Elia Kazan's Viva Zapata! (1952). After several brainstorming sessions, the team came up with a story loosely based on the three films and decided on the title Nadodi Mannan. The trio then helped make it look more Indian.

Nadodi Mannan was produced on a budget of ₹1.8 million, (Note: The exchange rate in 1958 was 4.79 Indian rupees (₹) per 1 US dollar (US$).) which was considered approximately two-and-a-half times more expensive than the average Tamil film made at the time. Nearly a year was spent on pre-production and casting. K. Ramnoth, who was initially roped in to direct the film, died before production began, resulting in Ramachandran taking over the position himself, thereby making his directorial debut. This was the second film produced by Ramachandran, and the first under the production banner of Em.Gee.Yar Pictures, which was handled by Ramachandran, Chakrapani and Veerappan. Kannadasan and Ravindar, who assisted Veerappan, Lakshmanan and Sami with the story, wrote the dialogues. The screenplay was written by the trio of C. Kuppusami, K. Srinivasan and P. Neelakantan. G. K. Ramu, K. Nageswar Rao and R. N. Nagaraja Rao were in charge of cinematography, art direction and stills. K. P. Ramakrishnan and Arunachalam acted as stunt doubles for Ramachandran.

Film historian Film News Anandan noticed publicity stills of Nadodi Mannan on Veerappan's office desk when he happened to visit the office of Em.Gee.Yar Pictures. He then offered to distribute them to the press. Veerappan agreed knowing that Anandan was then a member of the South Indian Film Journalists Association. After a few days, stills of the film were published in many magazines. Ramachandran was impressed with Anandan's work and, at Veerappan's suggestion, hired him as the film's public relations officer (PRO). This was Anandan's debut film as a PRO; however, his name does not appear in the opening credits.

=== Casting ===
In those days, I had thought about poverty and people's situation. Rather than saying 'thinking', it would be proper to say, I was experiencing the same. Occasionally, I thought, why these problems exist. The answer I received was, 'It's because of foreigner's rule.' But I didn't realize that the foreigner's rule will be forever. Therefore, even if the foreigner's rule vanishes, the rulers should be of good mind. Then, people will benefit. That's why I created the vagabond character. Then, I thought about the situation of the king. Those who are ruling us now, belong to our tribe. They live with us. But their thinking and talents are controlled by foreigners. Thus, I imagined, if they join with commoners? This was the focus of the king character.

— M. G. Ramachandran

During the filming of Alibabavum 40 Thirudargalum (1956), an advertisement for Nadodi Mannan was released describing it as an adaptation of The Prisoner of Zenda. (Note: T. G. Vaidyanathan of the magazine Film World stated that Nadodi Mannan was a "free adaptation" of The Prisoner of Zenda and not an official one.) Two days later, Bharani Pictures, the production company co-founded by P. S. Ramakrishna Rao and P. Bhanumathi, released an advertisement for a film whose concept was similar to The Prisoner of Zenda. When Ramachandran and Bhanumathi heard their films were similar, they tried to convince each other to change their film's storyline. After much deliberation, Ramachandran told Bhanumathi that he was keeping "only the section of a commoner switched to king" in the original, while the rest of the film would be different. Ramachandran accepted that they were both confused over what to do next. A few days later, for unknown reasons, Bharani Pictures' planned film was shelved. Bhanumathi informed Ramachandran and told him he could go ahead with his film. She offered Ramachandran her shelved film's script, written by A. K. Velan, and asked him to use it for Nadodi Mannan. Ramachandran thanked her for her generosity, and offered her the role of Madhana; Bhanumathi agreed.

M. N. Rajam was cast as Manohari, the queen of Ratnapuri, and king Marthandan's wife. Ramachandran wanted Rajam for the role to avoid her being typecast as a character-driven by jealousy and malice. For the role of Ratna, B. Saroja Devi was selected after a successful audition. Saroja Devi was not fluent in Tamil at the time, so her dialogues were written in such a way that she would find it easier to pronounce them. P. S. Veerappa, M. N. Nambiar and Chakrapani played the antagonists Vijayavarman, Pingalan and Karmegam. T. K. Balachandran, who was prominent in Malayalam films, was cast as Bhupathi. K. R. Ramsingh was selected for the role of Madhana and Bhupathi's father, Veerabahu, after Ramachandran was impressed by his performance in one of the stage plays he featured in. Chandrababu played Veerangan's friend and sidekick, Sagayam. T. P. Muthulakshmi was cast as Nagamma, a native of Kanni Theevu, who wants a husband. G. Sakunthala played Manohari's lady-in-waiting Nandini and K. S. Angamuthu the restaurateur Pappa respectively.

=== Filming ===
Nadodi Mannan was filmed in black-and-white for the sequences in Ratnapuri, and in Gevacolor for the later scenes depicting the happenings on Kanni Theevu. The film's colour sections were processed at the Film Centre laboratory in Bombay. Principal photography took place from 1956 to 1957 over a period of 156 days, which was more than the usual amount of time taken for shooting as most films in that period were completed in 40–50 days. The song "Sammadhama" was the first sequence to be shot. The underwater sequence for the song "Kannil Vanthu Minnalpol", the dance scenes for the song "Maanaithedi Machchaan", and "Thoongathey Thambi Thoongathey" took 12, 9 and 3 days each to shoot. The climax portions involving Ramachandran, Saroja Devi and Veerappa required 11 days of filming, while the sword fights between of Ramachandran and Nambiar were shot in a week.

As the director, Ramachandran wanted the end result to be perfect and shot multiple retakes for the same scene. Bhanumathi found his perfectionist directorial style demanding as she was used to finishing her scenes in a single take. She complained about the same, opining that Ramachandran should leave the job of directing the film to someone else instead, only then would she provide her commitment without charging any additional cost. Ramachandran asked her to either do the role as he preferred or leave the project. Bhanumathi left, and her remaining scenes were altered by having her character, Madhana, die. Since Ramachandran shot retakes, a lot of film was wasted. At the time, film studios allowed the use of only a small number of film rolls to avoid budgetary concerns. Ramachandran bought 1,000 feet (300 m) from outside sources for ₹500, which was considered expensive. As a result of these various problems during the project's production, it was dubbed as Komali Mannan ("Jester King") by the magazine Dina Thanthi.

During filming, Ramachandran received support from various members of the Tamil cinema industry. B. Nagi Reddy allowed Ramachandran to build the sets for Nadodi Mannan at Vijaya Vauhini Studios. Likewise, S. S. Vasan of Gemini Studios volunteered his equipment to ensure that the climax scenes came out well; it was the only time the studio's equipment was used outside its premises. The outdoor sequences were shot in collaboration with Aruna Films. Ramachandran asked director K. Subramanyam to participate in the filmmaking as an overseer. Subramanyam was impressed with Ramachandran's approach and felt there was no need for anyone to supervise him. Subrahmanyam also helped make arrangements for filming some outdoor shots at Munnar. These were done in collaboration with Aruna Films. Aarumugam handled the editing initially, but left during the beginning of the film's principal photography; he was later replaced by K. Perumal. C. P. Jambulingam took responsibility for editing the film's colour portions after Perumal suddenly fell ill. The final length of Nadodi Mannan was 19,830 feet (6,040 m).

== Themes ==
Nadodi Mannan was inspired by films such as The Prisoner of Zenda, If I Were King and Viva Zapata!. Ramachandran, in an account about the film he wrote in 1959, mentioned three specific differences from The Prisoner of Zenda. In the original, the look-alike and the queen have an intimate relationship while in Nadodi Mannan, Veerangan rejects Manohari's advances. When she realises that Veerangan is not Marthandan, she addresses him as her brother instead. Secondly, the look-alike was related to the king and shared the same interests. Veerangan is not related to Marthandan and initially has contrasting traits until they meet. Thirdly, the character of Vijayavarman, and the sequences in Kanni Theevu, do not feature in the original, while these were incorporated as part of Nadodi Mannan's main plot.

Sri Lankan film historian Sachi Sri Kantha noted that several of Ramachandran's films reflect the 1950s trend of films being "costume dramas" that focus on princes and folk heroes, citing Nadodi Mannan as an example. Kantha points out that the protagonist featured in a "riding scene with an educational (or philosophical) song" with "either the heroine or a side-kick (comedian) or an actor in a minor role" alongside him is a recurring theme in many films starring Ramachandran. According to Kantha, this was after the song "Ethanai Kaalam Thaan Ematruvar Indha Naatinile" from Malaikkallan (1954) became popular. In Nadodi Mannan, the song "Summa Kedandha" which features Ramachandran alongside Bhanumathi, and "Uzhaipa Thilla" which features an extra, were described by Kantha as "educational songs with a riding scene".

R. Ilangovan of Frontline magazine believed the lyrics for "Summa Kedandha", which were written by Pattukkottai Kalyanasundaram who was a member of the Communist Party of India, "are a classic example of how he presented forcefully the idea of radical reforms". Ilangovan mentions the presentation of reforms by Kalyanasundaram in the song is indicated by two lines: "Kadu velanchenna machan, namakku kaiyum, kalum thane mitcham" (What if the fields are lush with crops, we are left with mere hands and legs) reflects a pessimistic tone, while “Kadu vilayttum ponnae, namakku kalam irukkuthu pennae” (Let the fields sprout, young lady, our time will come), presents an optimistic feel.

Nadodi Mannan is considered by many critics, historians and intellectuals to be a propaganda film of the Dravida Munnetra Kazhagam (DMK) as Ramachandran was affiliated with the party at that time. Film historians Ashish Rajadhyaksha and Paul Willemen, Vaasanthi, S. Rajanayagam and politician S. Jagathrakshakan note that the black and red flag of the DMK, as well as the party's rising sun symbol, are seen in the film. Rajadhyaksha and Willemen further state that Vijayavarman's corrupt nature is "a thinly disguised reference to the Congress Party". Both Vaasanthi and another film historian, Selvaraj Velayutham, mention a scene where Ramachandran issues a decree that can be passed off as "a DMK election manifesto". (Note: S. Rajanayagam mentions in his book, Popular Cinema and Politics in South India: The Films of MGR and Rajinikanth, that when Ramachandran assumed office as the Chief Minister of Tamil Nadu, news reporters asked him what his plans were. To this, he replied, "See my Nadodi Mannan and you will get the answer".) According to both Erik Barnouw and Sisir Kumar Das, the song "Senthamizhe" represents the glorification of the Tamil language, identity and culture. It also symbolises what Das describes as "a medium of propagation of D.M.K. ideology". Of the same song, Ramachandran's biographer R. Kannan found it to be a continuation of including songs with political messages in films beginning with Malaikkallan. Ramachandran even went on to say, during the celebration of the film's 100th-day theatrical run, that: "Nadodi Mannan has been produced to show that the DMK is the party which is serving the people of this country."

== Music ==
N. S. Balakrishnan composed the songs "Paadupattathannale", "Sammadhama" and "Senthamizhe" while the rest were by S. M. Subbaiah Naidu, who was also in charge of the background score. The songs' lyrics were written by Pattukkottai Kalyanasundaram, Suratha, Kavi Lakshmanadas, N. M. Muthukkoothan and M. K. Athmanathan. The song "Varuga Varuga Vendhe", written by Suratha, was also composed in Kannada, Malayalam and in Telugu with lyrics by Vijaya Narasimha, P. Bhaskaran, and Narayanababu respectively. The track "Summa Kedandha" was written earlier for the news agency Janasakthi before Kalyansundaram used it for the film with a few minor changes in the lyrics. The songs were recorded on 45 RPM records produced by The Gramophone Company of India Ltd label, which also released the soundtrack. Plans for the inclusion of another track, "Kaalai Maatai Paal Karaga Paarkiraanga", were dropped since a pair of bullocks were used as the symbol of the Congress Party at that time.

The soundtrack received positive feedback with songs like "Thoongathey Thambi Thoongathey," "Thadukkathey", "Summa Kedandha" and "Senthamizhe" becoming popular hits. Sachi Sri Kantha called "Thoongathey Thambi Thoongathey" a "magical educational song," further describing it as one of the songs that Ramachandran used to direct "his attention on the listlessness among Tamil workers". Rajadhyaksha and Willemen mention in their book, Encyclopedia of Indian Cinema, that "Thoongathey Thambi Thoongathey" had inaugurated "MGR's personal political programme". Both Sridhar Swaminathan of Hindu Tamil Thisai and Maayan of the Tamil magazine Ananda Vikatan also cite the same song as a good example of children's education. A reviewer from The New Indian Express called the songs "philosophy-espousing" while noting how they "spelt the Dravidian tenets".

Track list
No.	Title	Lyrics	Singer(s)	Length
1.	"Kannil Vandhu Minnalpol"	Suratha	T. M. Soundararajan, Jikki	04:24
2.	"Kannoda Kannu"	Pattukkottai Kalyanasundaram	Jikki	06:24
3.	"Thoongathey Thambi Thoongathey"	Pattukkottai Kalyanasundaram	T. M. Soundararajan	03:12
4.	"Uzhaipa Thilla"	Kavi Lakshmanadas	Sirkazhi Govindarajan	03:35
5.	"Thadukkathey"	M. K. Aathmanathan	Chandrababu, K. Jamuna Rani	03:03
6.	"Maanaithedi Machan"	Pattukkottai Kalyanasundaram	Jikki	04:38
7.	"Summa Kedandha"	Pattukkottai Kalyanasundaram	T. M. Soundararajan, P. Bhanumathi	03:16
8.	"Varuga Varuga Vendhe" (Tamil)	Suratha	N. L. Ganasaraswathi, P. S. Vaidehi	06:01
9.	"Namma Dravidare Kulage" (Kannada)	Vijaya Narasimha	Jikki	06:01
10.	"Dravidamaam" (Malayalam)	P. Bhaskaran	Santha P. Nair	06:01
11.	"Kudakkalla Kimpuma" (Telugu)	Narayanababu	Jikki	06:01
12.	"Paadupattathannale"	M. K. Aathmanathan	T. V. Rathnam	03:18
13.	"Sammadhama"	N. M. Muthukkoothan	P. Bhanumathi	02:29
14.	"Senthamizhe"	N. M. Muthukkoothan	T. M. Soundararajan	03:06
Total length:				01:01:29

== Release ==
Nadodi Mannan was released on 22 August 1958. The expenses made for the film resulted in Ramachandran not having enough money to buy release prints. (Note: According to film trade analyst Sreedhar Pillai, six release prints were released for Nadodi Mannan.) Hence, Veerappan and Chakrapani decided to acquire a legal loan of ₹50,000 from AVM Productions. However, Ramachandran's signature was required for the loan contract. When they consulted with him on this issue, he asked Veerappan and Chakrapani to tell the studio's founder A. V. Meiyappan that they would repay the loan and keep the price paid by the production company, Cinemas Limited, for distribution rights for the film's release in Sri Lanka as collateral. Meiyappan agreed to provide the loan, which was repaid by Veerappan immediately after the film's release.

== Reception ==
=== Critical response ===
The film received positive critical response. A review carried by Ananda Vikatan dated 7 September 1958, appreciated the film for being a commercial entertainer, describing it as a treat to the eyes. The review concluded that the film could be seen more than once. K. Jeshi from The Hindu appreciated the filmmaking techniques used to portray Ramachandran's dual roles, noting that it was "technically superior". A reviewer from the entertainment and news website Sify called it "a pucca mass entertainer".

Rajadhyaksha and Willemen mention that Nadodi Mannan was made "in a style derived from Gemini's post-Chandralekha (1948) films". James K. Norton, the author of the book Global Studies, India and South Asia, called the film "a prime example of how rhetoric and action were combined to build an image as a hero of the oppressed". Rajanayagam however, criticised Ramachandran's role as Marthandan, pointing out that the character's mannerisms are "overdone to the point of annoyance".

=== Box office ===
Shortly before its release, Ramachandran's take on the film's fate was: "I am a king if this were to succeed. If not, I will be a vagabond." The film turned out to be an unprecedented success at the box office, grossing ₹1.1 crore, becoming only the second Tamil film to earn more than ₹1 crore after Madurai Veeran (1956), which also featured Ramachandran in the lead. The film ran for 100 days in 23 theatres worldwide. It went on to achieve a theatrical run of 175 days and become a silver jubilee film. (Note: A silver jubilee film is one that completes a theatrical run of 175 days.) It was dubbed into Telugu as Anaganaga Oka Raju and as Hamen Bhi Jeene Do in Hindi.

The DMK party celebrated the success of Nadodi Mannan with a public function on 16 October 1958 at the Tamukkam Ground in Madurai organized by R.M.Veerappan. The function, which was attended by 200,000 people, saw Ramachandran being taken in a procession on a chariot drawn by four horses and garlanded twice. He was awarded a golden sword worth 50 kg by the party leader C. N. Annadurai and member V. R. Nedunchezhiyan. Ramachandran later donated the sword to the Kollur Mookambika Temple.

The film's 100th-day theatrical run celebrations were held on 30 November 1958 at the Alagappa College in Madurai. Another round of celebrations were held on the same day at the SIAA Grounds in Chennai where Annadurai praised Ramachandran, calling him his "Idhayakkani" or "heart's fruit", also stating, "Praising MGR is like me praising myself". Ramachandran later called that moment as the most memorable one in his life.

== Legacy ==
=== Impact and influence ===
"When he introduced me in Nadodi Mannan, I was so naive. He took care of me so well and used to give advice and tips while acting. After that we have acted together in several films. Without MGR, there's no Saroja Devi!"

— Saroja Devi on M. G. Ramachandran in an interview with Deccan Chronicle.

Nadodi Mannan was a turning point in Ramachandran's career as both an actor and a politician. The film's success earned him the nickname "Puratchi Thalaivar" ("revolutionary leader"). Biographer Kannan dubbed the film as "the biggest propaganda blitzkrieg for the DMK till then. Film historian Swarnavel Eswaran Pillai called Nadodi Mannan Ramachandran's "defining film as a star". The film acquired cult status in Tamil cinema and propelled Saroja Devi to stardom. T. S. Subramanian of Frontline noted that it was one among many of Ramachandran's films in the 1950s where he "espoused his personal ideals such as helping the poor, being chivalrous and fighting injustice." Film historian and critic Randor Guy labelled Nadodi Mannan as among the most memorable films both Nambiar and Veerappa had worked in. In 2024, K. Sivan said that when he first joined ISRO, he was assigned to the Geosynchronous Satellite Launch Vehicle (GSLV) project, which had experienced four consecutive failures. His seniors teased him about working on this project, and he responded by recalling Ramachandran's anecdote about Nadodi Mannan, and successfully led the GSLV project to fruition.

Ramachandran planned his second directorial film to be titled after the song "Thoongathey Thambi Thoongathey", but the project was abandoned, (Note: S. R. Ashok Kumar does not mention why the project was abandoned.) and the song was instead used as the title for a 1983 film starring Kamal Haasan. In their 2006 reviews of Imsai Arasan 23rd Pulikecei, both Baskaran of The Hindu, and S. Sudha of Rediff.com, mention the film shared similarities with Nadodi Mannan. In July 2007, S. R. Ashok Kumar of The Hindu asked eight Tamil film directors to list their all-time favourite Tamil films; K. Bhagyaraj named Nadodi Mannan. Bhagyaraj selected the film because he "enjoyed the way both heroes combine acting prowess with entertainment". In the film Padikkadavan (2009), Assault Aarumugam (Vivek) is disguised as a woman and is chased by two thugs who mistake him for a real woman. During the chase, the song "Maanaithedi Machan" is played in the background.

Baradwaj Rangan, writing for The Hindu in 2014, mentions in his review of Kaththi that the film's basic plot was "the old Naadodi Mannan [sic] template, shaped with a relevant, burning social angle." For the same newspaper, Namrata Joshi noted that Prem Ratan Dhan Payo (2015) bore a resemblance to Nadodi Mannan in terms of a prince's look-alike taking his place. Lyricist Thamarai mentions in her interview with Rangan that she wishes to write songs as beautiful as "Thoongathey Thambi Thoongathey". Haasan has acknowledged various films as influences on Michael Madana Kama Rajan (1990), namely Nadodi Mannan along with Deiva Magan (1969) and Yaadon Ki Baaraat (1973).

=== Cancelled sequel ===
Ramachandran had planned a sequel to Nadodi Mannan titled Nadodiyin Magan, but the project was abandoned. (Note: S. Kirubakaran does not mention why the project was abandoned.)

=== Re-releases ===
Nadodi Mannan was first re-released on 4 August 2006 in Chennai and Chengalpattu by Divya Films, which spent ₹300,000 on poster designs and promotions for its re-release. The film opened to a positive response from the audience. It received another successful re-release on 18 March 2011 in Madurai.

== Bibliography ==
- Barnouw, Erik (1996). Media Marathon: A Twentieth-century Memoir. Durham, North Carolina: Duke University Press. ISBN 978-0-8223-1728-9.
- Baskaran, Sundararaj Theodore (24 December 2013) [1996]. The Eye of The Serpent: An Introduction To Tamil Cinema. Chennai: Westland. ISBN 978-93-83260-74-4.
- Das, Sisir Kumar (1991). History of Indian Literature: 1911–1956, struggle for freedom : triumph and tragedy. New Delhi: Sahitya Akademi. ISBN 978-81-7201-798-9.
- Jagathrakshakan, S. (1984). Dr. M. G. R.: A Phenomenon. Apollo Veliyeetagam. OCLC 13425247.
- Kannan, R. (2010). Anna: The Life and Times of C.N. Annadurai. New Delhi: Penguin Books. ISBN 978-0-670-08328-2.
- Kannan, R. (28 June 2017). MGR: A Life. India: Penguin Random House. ISBN 978-93-86495-88-4.
- National Film Development Corporation of India (1 January 1998). Indian cinema: A Visual Voyage. Mumbai: Ministry of Information and Broadcasting. ISBN 978-81-2300-646-8.
- Norton, James K. (1993). Global Studies, India and South Asia. Guilford, Connecticut: Dushkin Publishing Group. ISBN 978-1-56134-113-9.
- Pillai, Swarnavel Eswaran (27 January 2015). Madras Studios: Narrative, Genre, and Ideology in Tamil Cinema. New Delhi: SAGE Publications. ISBN 978-93-5150-212-8.
- Rajadhyaksha, Ashish; Willemen, Paul (1998) [1994]. Encyclopaedia of Indian Cinema. British Film Institute and Oxford University Press. ISBN 0-19-563579-5.
- Rajanayagam, S. (12 June 2015). Popular Cinema and Politics in South India: The Films of MGR and Rajinikanth. New Delhi: Routledge. ISBN 978-1-138-82203-0.
- Rangan, Baradwaj (2014). Dispatches from the Wall Corner: A Journey through Indian Cinema. Chennai: Tranquebar Press. ISBN 978-93-84030-56-8.
- Vaasanthi (2008). Cut-outs, Caste and Cines Stars. New Delhi: Penguin Books. ISBN 978-0-14-306312-4.
- Velayutham, Selvaraj (3 April 2008). Tamil Cinema: The Cultural Politics of India's Other Film Industry. Abingdon-on-Thames: Routledge. ISBN 978-0-203-93037-3.
