= Pudhaiyal =

- Theatrical release poster
- Directed by: Krishnan–Panju
- Written by: M. Karunanidhi
- Starring: Sivaji Ganesan; Padmini
- Cinematography: G. Vittal Rao
- Edited by: S. Panjabi
- Music by: Viswanathan–Ramamoorthy
- Production company: Kamal Brothers
- Release date: 10 May 1957
- Country: India
- Language: Tamil

Pudhaiyal (transl. Treasure) is a 1957 Indian Tamil-language film directed by Krishnan–Panju and written by M. Karunanidhi, starring Sivaji Ganesan and Padmini. The film was released on 10 May 1957.

== Plot ==
Parimalam and Durai meet and talk about how her father Kumaravadivu in Sri Lanka was implicated in her mother's murder and imprisoned. Padmini and her sister Thangam come to India, where the sister dies. It is believed that she drowned and her body lies under the sand. Vellaiambalam overhears the word "Thangam" (Tamil for gold) and believes a fortune is buried there.

== Cast ==
- Sivaji Ganesan as Durai
- Padmini as Parimalam
- T. S. Balaiah as Vellaiambalam
- M. N. Rajam as Menaka
- J. P. Chandrababu as Thukkaram
- M. K. Radha as Kumaravadivu
- S. A. Ashokan as the Police Inspector

== Production ==
Pudhaiyal was primarily shot at Newtone and Revathi Studios, and processed at AVM Studio Film Laboratories. The song "Vinnodum Mugilodum" was shot at Elliot's Beach.

== Soundtrack ==
The music composed by Viswanathan–Ramamoorthy. Lyrics by Mahakavi Bharathiyar, Thanjai N. Ramaiah Dass, A. Maruthakasi, Pattukkottai Kalyanasundaram and M. K. Athmanathan. The "lalala" humming portions in "Hello, My Dear Rami" were inspired from "The Wedding Samba" by Edmundo Ros.

Song	Singers	Lyrics	Length
"Vinnodum Mugilodum"	C. S. Jayaraman & P. Suseela	M. K. Athmanathan	03:18
"Thanga Mohana Thaamaraiye"	P. Suseela	M. K. Athmanathan	03:54
"Unakkaga Ellam Unakkaga"	J. P. Chandrababu	Pattukkottai Kalyanasundaram	03:38
"Chinna Chinna Izhai"	P. Suseela	Pattukkottai Kalyanasundaram	05:05
"Hello, My Dear Rami"	J. P. Chandrababu & A. L. Raghavan	Pattukkottai Kalyanasundaram	03:34
"Aasai Kaathalai"	P. Suseela	A. Maruthakasi	03:07
"Seer Kondu...Kandi Raaja"	T. M. Soundararajan, M. K. Punitham & S. J. Kantha	Thanjai N. Ramaiah Dass	03:40
"Nallakalam Varugudhu"	T. M. Soundararajan & P. Suseela	Mahakavi Subramania Bharathiyar	03:25

== Reception ==
Not very successful
