= Mahadevi (film) =

1957 film by Sundar Rao Nadkarni

- Theatrical release poster
- Directed by: Sundar Rao Nadkarni
- Screenplay by: Kannadasan
- Based on: Punya Prabhav by R. G. Katkari
- Produced by: Sundar Rao Nadkarni; B. Radhakrishna
- Starring: M. G. Ramachandran; Savithri
- Cinematography: G. K. Ramu
- Edited by: P. Venkatachalam
- Music by: Viswanathan–Ramamoorthy
- Production company: Sri Ganesh Movietone
- Distributed by: Sri Krishna Films
- Release date: 22 November 1957
- Running time: 160 minutes
- Country: India
- Language: Tamil

Mahadevi is a 1957 Indian Tamil-language film directed by Sundar Rao Nadkarni and written by Kannadasan. Starring M. G. Ramachandran and Savithri, it is based on the novel Punya Prabhav by R. G. Katkari. The film was released on 22 November 1957.

== Plot ==
Mahadevi is a princess, whose father, the king, is defeated in battle. Despite this, he is invited by the rival king to stay with him as his honoured guest. The victorious king has an adopted daughter Mangamma and a son. His senior commander, Karunakaran is attracted to Mahadevi, but she rejects him. Thereby she earns his wrath. Karunakaran hatches various evil plans to get her, but in the meantime, Mahadevi falls in love with the other commander, Vallavan. Karunakaran tries to kidnap Mahadevi with the help of his sidekick Mariappan, but by mistake ends up kidnapping Mangamma. To cover up his folly, Karunakaran ends up marrying her. Mahadevi and Vallavan marry in due course. After a while, Mahadevi delivers a son, even as Karunakaran continues to lust for Mahadevi. Mangamma supports Mahadevi, and protects her from Karunakaran. When Mangamma learns of her husband's plans to kill Mahadevi's baby, she replaces her baby with Mahadevi's, causing Karunakaran to kill his own child. When Karunakaran realises the truth, he kills himself and so does his wife.

== Cast ==
- M. G. Ramachandran as General Vallavan
- Savithri as Mahadhevi
- P. S. Veerappa as General Karunakaran
- M. N. Rajam as Princess Mangamma
- J. P. Chandrababu as Mariappan
- Master Murali as Young Prince
- T. P. Muthulakshmi as Vasantha
- O. A. K. Thevar as Thalapathi
- A. Karunanidhi as Muthupulavan
- Sattampillai Venkatraman
- P. Susheela

== Soundtrack ==
The music was composed by Viswanathan–Ramamoorthy.

Song	Singers	Lyrics	Length
"Kaka Kaka Maikondaa"	M. S. Rajeswari	A. Maruthakasi	03:20
"Kaamugar Nenjil"	K. Jamuna Rani	A. Maruthakasi	03:29
"Thaayatthu Thaayatthu"	T. M. Soundararajan	Pattukkottai Kalyanasundaram	03:01
"Kurukku Vazhiyil"	T. M. Soundararajan	Pattukkottai Kalyanasundaram	03:03
"Un Thirumugatthai"	J. P. Chandrababu & A. G. Rathnamala	Thanjai N. Ramaiah Dass	03:20
"Thanthana Paattu"	J. P. Chandrababu & A. G. Rathnamala	Thanjai N. Ramaiah Dass	03:21
"Eru Poottuvom"	T. M. Soundararajan	Thanjai N. Ramaiah Dass	03:17
"Kanmoodum Velaiyilum"	A. M. Rajah & P. Susheela	Kannadasan	03:14
"Singara Punnagai"	M. S. Rajeswari & R. Balasaraswathi Devi	Kannadasan	03:33
"Maanam Ondre Perithena"	T. S. Bagavathi	Kannadasan	03:29
"Sevai Seivadhe Aanandham"	M. S. Rajeswari & T. M. Soundararajan	Kannadasan	04:08

== Reception ==
It is a successful movie. Ran for 100 days in multiple centres mainly due to acting of Savitri and music of Viswanathan Ramamurthy.

== Legacy ==
The dialogue "Mananthal Mahadevi Illaiyel Maranadevi" uttered by Veerappa became hugely popular. In all likelihood Kannadasan is the first to introduce punch dialogues to Tamil cinema.

The song " Nanandri yaar varvar " was first written for this movie. But MGR did not like it. So Kanbadasan wrote " kann moodum velaiyile" .

Later kannadsan used the song "Nanandri yaar varuvaar" in his own film Malaiyitta mangai
