= Kavalai Illaadha Manithan =

1960 film by K. Shankar

- Theatrical release poster
- Directed by: K. Shankar
- Written by: Kannadasan
- Produced by: K. S. Ranganathan; Kannadasan
- Starring: Chandrababu; Rajasulochana
- Cinematography: Thambu
- Edited by: K. Shankar; K. Narayanan
- Music by: Viswanathan–Ramamoorthy
- Production company: Kannadasan Productions
- Release date: 19 August 1960
- Country: India
- Language: Tamil

Kavalai Illaadha Manithan (transl. The man without worries) is a 1960 Indian Tamil-language film directed by K. Shankar, written and co-produced by Kannadasan. The film stars Chandrababu and Rajasulochana, with M. R. Radha, T. S. Balaiah, T. R. Mahalingam, M. N. Rajam, and L. Vijayalakshmi in supporting roles. It was released on 19 August 1960 and was not a commercial success.

== Plot ==
Muthu is a carefree lawyer who solves the problems of people, in stark contrast to his brother Manickam who believes in creating trouble for those around him, especially women. Their wealthy father Jamabulingam is money-minded and is least bothered about other things in life. Jamabulingam arranges the marriage of Manickam with a woman named Sivakami, but she loves another man named Dhamotharan. Manickam impregnates Kaveri, a poor woman, then disavows her and their child. Muthu manages to correct all the wrongs caused by Manickam, succeeds in bringing Sivakami and Dhamotharan together, and marries a woman named Sevanthi.

== Cast ==
Male cast

- Chandrababu as Muthu
- M. R. Radha as Manickam
- T. S. Balaiah as Jamabulingam
- T. R. Mahalingam as Dhamotharan
- Kannadasan as the chief guest at the convocation (uncredited)

Female cast

- Rajasulochana as Kaveri
- M. N. Rajam as Sivakami
- L. Vijayalakshmi as Sevanthi

== Soundtrack ==
The music was composed by Viswanathan–Ramamoorthy, and the lyrics written by Kannadasan. The song "Pirakkum Podhum Azhuginraai" became popular.

Song	Singers	Length
"Kaattil Maram"	K. Jamuna Rani	03:34
"Kavalai Illaadha Manidhan"	Chandrababu	03:03
"Naan Deivamaa"	T. R. Mahalingam	03:06
"Penn Parkka Maappillai"	K. Jamuna Rani	03:39
"Pirakkum Podhum Azhugindraai"	Chandrababu	03:38
"Kannodu Vin Pesum Jaadai"	T. S. Bagavathi, G. K. Venkatesh, K. Jamuna Rani and A. L. Raghavan	05:53
"Sirikka Chonnaar Siritthen"	P. Susheela	02:32
"Kann Koduththadhu Polae"	T. M. Soundararajan and Jikki	04:07

== Release and reception ==
Kavalai Illaadha Manithan was released on 19 August 1960. The Indian Express wrote, "Raja Sulochana has done justice to her part. But there is no seriousness at all in Radha's acting and Chandrababu's seriousness is rendered ludicrous". Film historian Randor Guy noted that the film was not a commercial success, mainly because of the delay in its production. Kannadasan later remarked that, in contrast to the film's title which meant "the man without worries", he, as the producer, became "a much worried man in the process".
