= Tambaram Lalitha =

Indian actress

Tambaram Lalitha (also known as Thambaram Lalitha, Tambaram N. Lalitha) was an Indian stage and film actress who acted in about 100 films as heroine and in supporting roles.

She died in 1983.

== Partial filmography ==
1. Town Bus (1955)
2. Kokilavani (1956)
3. Paditha Penn (1956)
4. Amudhavalli (1959)
5. Bhaaga Pirivinai (1959) as Amutha
6. Mamiyar Mechina Marumagal (1959)
7. Orey Vazhi (1959)
8. Sahodhari (1959) as Thangam
9. Sivagangai Seemai (1959)
10. Thalai Koduthaan Thambi (1959) as Princess
11. Veerapandiya Kattabomman (1959) as Valli
12. Aalukkoru Veedu (1960)
13. Chavukkadi Chandrakantha (1960)
14. Deivapiravi (1960) as Nandhini
15. Meenda Sorgam (1960) as Prabha Hero's wife who commits suicide later
16. Thilakam (1960)
17. Kappalottiya Thamizhan (1961)
18. Kongunattu Thangam (1961)
19. Vazhikatti (1965)
20. Santhi (1965) as Nagamma
21. Neelagiri Express (1968) as Geetha's mother
22. Aayiram Poi (1969) as Kalyani
23. Ponnu Mappillai (1969)
24. Karundhel Kannayiram (1972)
25. Manjal Kungumam (1973)
26. Andharangam (1975)
27. Shri Kanchi Kamakshi (1978) as Kali
28. Gnana Kuzhandhai (1979) as Sivanesan's Wife
29. Pasi (1979) as Valliamma

== Bibliography ==
- Dhananjayan, G. (2014). Pride of Tamil Cinema: 1931 to 2013. Blue Ocean Publishers.
