= Thattungal Thirakkappadum =

- Poster
- Directed by: Chandrababu
- Screenplay by: Chandrababu; Sam.T. Daasan (dialogue)
- Story by: Chandrababu
- Starring: Savitri; K. R. Vijaya; Baby Mahalakshmi; Chandrababu; Manohar
- Cinematography: T. S. Rangasamy
- Music by: M. S. Viswanathan
- Production company: Viswabharathi Films
- Distributed by: Sunrise
- Release date: 17 June 1966
- Running time: 124 minutes
- Country: India
- Language: Tamil

Thattungal Thirakkappadum (transl. Knock, and the door will be opened) is a 1966 Indian Tamil-language thriller film directed by J. P. Chandrababu. Savitri Ganesh, K. R. Vijaya, Shoba (credited as Baby Mahalakshmi), Chandrababu and Manohar star, while A. V. M. Rajan, Cho and M. R. R. Vasu play supporting roles. Shoba made her debut film as a child artist in this film. The film was released on 17 June 1966. When the film was released, the clip of the song Kalyana Panthal Alangaram was not in the film due to a delay in the shooting and editing. In the second week, the clip was merged into the film. The film was a failure due to a weak plot.

== Plot ==
Shankar murders his mistress, Geetha after finding out that she has had a child with another man. Adaikalam, who is mute and an orphan is blamed for this murder. Adaikalam gets arrested by the police. Shankar meets his wife (the one that he had abandoned) Meenakshi, and his daughter and lives with them. When Shankar goes abroad on business, by ship and the ship explodes. Shankar feigns death after which, his insurance money is received by Meenakshi. Shankar needed that money to pay off his debts so he pretended to be dead and made Meenakshi take the insurance money and pay his debts. Shankar and Meenakshi have a fight. While fighting, Shankar's daughter gets frightened and kills Shankar. Meenakshi is shocked and hides his body in a room. That's when Adaikalam gets released from jail. When he goes to meet Shankar, Meenakshi tries to stop him entering the room, but she cannot. When Adaikalam sees the body, he is shocked. Meenakshi pretends not to know anything about this and calls the police. When the police come, they investigate and come to know that Meenakshi killed Shankar. Meenakshi is arrested and her daughter is taken care of by Adaikalam.

== Cast ==
- Savitri Ganesh as Meenakshi
- K. R. Vijaya as Geetha
- Baby Mahalakshmi as Meenakshi's daughter
- J. P. Chandrababu as Adaikalam
- Manohar as Shankar
- A. V. M. Rajan as the doctor
- Cho as the lawyer
- M. R. R. Vasu as the servant

== Production ==
Chandrababu was to have made his directorial debut with Maadi Veettu Ezhai, which was shelved; as a result, Thattungal Thirakkappadum became his directorial debut. The filming was held at Ooty.

== Soundtrack ==
The music was composed by M. S. Viswanathan and lyrics were written by Kannadasan.

Track listing
No.	Title	Singer(s)	Length
1.	"Thittippadhu Edhu"	P. Susheela	04:00
2.	"Kanmani Pappa"	J. P. Chandrababu	04:24
3.	"Kalyana Panthal Alangaram"	P. Susheela	03:21
4.	"Oor Paadum Thaalaattu"	P. Susheela	04:21
Total length:			16:06

== Critical reception ==
Kalki praised the acting of actors, cinematography but felt songs did not stay in the mind and concluded saying we expected innovation and revolution in Chandrababu's film but got disappointed.
