= Peria Koil =

1958 film by A. K. Velan

- Theatrical release poster
- Directed by: A. K. Velan
- Written by: A. K. Velan
- Produced by: A. K. Velan
- Starring: Prem Nazir; M. N. Rajam
- Cinematography: V. K. P. Maniam
- Edited by: V. P. Natarajan
- Music by: K. V. Mahadevan
- Production company: Arunachalam Pictures
- Distributed by: Brilliant Pictures
- Release date: 16 September 1958
- Country: India
- Language: Tamil

Peria Koil (transl. Big Temple) is a 1958 Tamil-language drama film written, produced and directed by A. K. Velan. The film stars Prem Nazir and M. N. Rajam. It was released on 16 September 1958, and failed commercially.

== Cast ==
- Prem Nazir
- M. N. Rajam
- Natarajan
- Chandrakantha
- V. K. Ramasamy
- P. Kannamba
- Manorama
- Parvathi

== Production ==
Peria Koil was written, produced and directed by A. K. Velan under Arunachalam Pictures. Cinematography was handled by V. K. P. Maniam, the art direction by T. V. Annamalai and the editing by V. P. Natarajan. The final length of the film was 13,927 feet (4,245 m).

== Soundtrack ==
The soundtrack was composed by K. V. Mahadevan, while the lyrics were written by A. Maruthakasi and P. K. Muthuswami.

| Song | Singer/s | Length |
|---|---|---|
| "Kanne Kamalappoo" | P. S. Vaidhehi | 02:20 |
| "Naa Poren Munnaale" | T. M. Soundararajan & T. V. Rathnam | 03:57 |
| "Poottukku Ettha Saavi Naan" | Seerkazhi Govindarajan | 03:45 |
| "Aathaadi Thallaadha Thaathaavai" | K. Jamuna Rani & L. R. Eswari | 05:26 |
| "Vaazhanum Penngal Vaazhanum" | T. V. Rathnam | 01:24 |
| "Valai Veesammaa Valai Veesu" | Seerkazhi Govindarajan & P. Susheela | 05:00 |
| "Thaavi Varum Kaaviriyin" | T. M. Soundararajan | 01:33 |
| "Kanne Kamalappoo" (pathos) | P. Leela | 02:34 |
| "Kollai Kollum Muraiyinile" | Seerkazhi Govindarajan & P. Susheela | 03:10 |
| "Malarnthidum Solai Malargalai" | P. S. Vaidhehi | 01:28 |
| "Kaasu Panam Selavalitthu" | Seerkazhi Govindarajan | 01:15 |

== Release ==
Peria Koil was released on 16 September 1958 all over South India. In Madras, it was distributed by Brilliant Pictures. The film failed commercially.
