= Maaman Magal (1955 film) =

1955 film by R. S. Mani

- Theatrical release poster
- Directed by: R. S. Mani
- Written by: C. V. Sridhar (dialogues)
- Story by: R. S. Mani
- Produced by: R. S. Mani
- Starring: Gemini Ganesan; Savitri; T. S. Balaiah; J. P. Chandrababu
- Cinematography: Nemai Ghosh
- Edited by: K. Govindasamy
- Music by: S. V. Venkatraman
- Production company: Mani Productions
- Release date: 14 October 1955
- Running time: 135 minutes
- Country: India
- Language: Tamil

Maaman Magal (transl. Uncle's daughter) is a 1955 Indian Tamil-language romantic comedy film written, produced and directed by R. S. Mani. The film stars Gemini Ganesan, Savitri, T. S. Balaiah and J. P. Chandrababu. Released on 14 October 1955, it was a moderate success.

== Plot ==
Dharmalingam is a rich widower and Malathi is his only daughter. His late wife left a will stating that Malathi should be married to her missing brother's son, who would inherit her wealth. Dharmalingam sends his friend Kanniyappan, who is after the young woman and her property, in search of him. The crook sets up his nephew Thandavam as the missing man and the father decides to get the two married. Meanwhile, another shy young man Chandran, who never looks at any women in the eye, becomes Malathi's teacher. They falls in love and decide to marry. Kanniyappan manages to get Chandran dismissed from his job. Chandran's grandmother Kamatchi gives him magic armour which will make him tough and bold. Chandran returns to his heartthrob disguised as an elderly gardener. The will suddenly disappears and more complications crop up. However, the truth surfaces, Kanniyappan is exposed, and the lovers unite.

== Cast ==
- Gemini Ganesan as Chandran
- Savitri as Malathi
- T. S. Balaiah as Kanniyappan
- D. Balasubramaniam as Dharmalingam
- J. P. Chandrababu as Thandavam
- T. S. Durairaj as Vingnanam
- Lakshmi Prabha as Gnanam
- S. R. Janaki as Kamakshi
- C. K. Saraswathi as Thandavam's sister
- O. A. K. Thevar as Veerasamy

== Production ==
Maaman Magal was produced and directed by R. S. Mani, who also wrote the story. The dialogue was written by C. V. Sridhar, not yet the acclaimed filmmaker he would later become. Cinematography was handled by Nemai Ghosh, and the editing by K. Govindasamy.

== Soundtrack ==
The soundtrack was composed by S. V. Venkatraman. The song "Govaa maambazhamey, Malgovaa Maambazhamey", picturised on Chandrababu and Dorairaj's characters, where the former expresses his love for Malathi (Savitri), looking at her photograph, became popular. Words in the song like ‘samaalakkidi girigiri..., saavuttu paaru vadakari...’ contributed to its popularity.

Songs	Singer	Lyrics	Length
"Endrumillaa...Enendru Nee Sollu Thendrale"	Jikki		04:02
"Malarum Manamum...Adhisayamaaga Ragasiyam Onnu"	A. M. Rajah		02:48
"Nenjile Uram...Thalai Nimirndhu Nilladaa"	T. M. Soundararajan	Surabhi	03:16
"Athisayamaana Ragasiyam"	Jikki		02:39
"Dhevi Neeye Thunai"	T. V. Rathnam	Papanasam Sivan	03:15
"Govaa Maambazhamey, Malgovaa Maambazhamey"	J. P. Chandrababu		03:24
"Aasai Nilaa Sendradhe"	Jikki	Kambadasan	03:10

== Release and reception ==
Maaman Magal was released on 14 October 1955, and emerged a moderate success.
