= Uzhavukkum Thozhilukkum Vandhanai Seivom =

1959 film by M. A. Thirumugam

- Song book cover
- Directed by: M. A. Thirumugam
- Screenplay by: S. Ayyapillai
- Produced by: Honnappa Bhagavathar
- Starring: Prem Nazir; E. V. Saroja; M. N. Rajam; P. Kannamba
- Cinematography: C. V. Moorthi
- Edited by: M. A. Thirumugam; M. Jagannathan
- Music by: K. V. Mahadevan
- Production company: Lalithakala Films
- Distributed by: Chettiar Films
- Release date: 26 June 1959
- Running time: 172 minutes
- Country: India
- Language: Tamil

Uzhavukkum Thozhilukkum Vandhanai Seivom (transl. Praise to agriculture and labour) is a 1959 Indian Tamil-language drama film directed by M. A. Thirumugam. The film stars Prem Nazir and E. V. Saroja. It was released on 26 June 1959.

== Plot ==
After the death of her husband a poor woman tries to bring up her two young sons. The elder son is taken by a rich mill owner and brought up as a wealthy young man who eventually inherits the mill. The younger son grows up in poverty and goes to work as a labourer in the mill. But the two do not know they are brothers. Both set their eyes on the same girl. The elder brother dismisses the younger brother and chases him away. He goes to live with the mother. The younger brother cultivates a piece of land and within a few years, he becomes a well-to-do person. Many mill workers leave the mill and go to work on the farm. The elder brother plans to destroy the farm and the workers' settlements. However, his girlfriend doesn't like this and sends word to the farm about the plot. The workers are saved. The elder brother plans to do away with the girlfriend and the younger brother. The rest of the story tells whether his plan succeeded, whether the farm becomes prosperous and whether the brothers are united.

== Cast ==
The details are compiled from the song book and from the database of Film News Anandan.

Male cast

- Prem Nazir
- O. A. K. Thevar
- D. Balasubramaniam
- A. Karunanidhi
- V. R. Rajagopal
- S. S. Kathiresan
- Kottappuli Jayaraman

Female cast

- E. V. Saroja
- P. Kannamba
- M. N. Rajam
- Gamini
- Rajeswari
- Radhabhai

Junior cast

- Master Gopal
- Master Varma

== Soundtrack ==
Music was composed by K. V. Mahadevan.

Song	Singer/s	Lyricist	Duration (m:ss)
"Thandhanathom Enru Solliye"; Villu Paattu	C. S. Pandian & group	Kannadasan	
"Kanniyare Kanniyare"	L. R. Eswari & group	Kannadasan	
"Kaai Kaai Avarai Kaai"	S. C. Krishnan & A. L. Raghavan	Kannadasan	03:02
"I Come From Paris"	P. Susheela, A. L. Raghavan & group	A. Maruthakasi	03:32
"Chinna Idai Odindhidave"	K. Jamuna Rani, L. R. Eswari & group	A. Maruthakasi	03:33
"Aasai Nenjame Poruppaai"	K. Jamuna Rani	A. Maruthakasi	02:49
"O! Singaara Pooncholai"	Sirkazhi Govindarajan & K. Jamuna Rani	A. Maruthakasi	03:05
"Maaname Peridhenre"	P. Leela	A. Maruthakasi	
"Uzhavukkum Thozhilukkum"	S. C. Krishnan, L. R. Eswari & group	A. Maruthakasi	
"Kovichikiraapula Kovichukaadha"	S. C. Krishnan & A. G. Ratnamala	T. K. Sundara Vathiyar	02:52
