= G. Sakunthala =

Indian actress

- ஜி. சகுந்தலா
- Born: 19 August 1932; Chidambaram, Thanjavur
- Died: 8 November 2004 (aged 72)
- Occupations: Film actress, Stage actress, Dancer
- Years active: 1950–1972
- Notable work: Manthiri Kumari, Thaaikkuppin Thaaram, Mannadhi Mannan, Athey Kangal, Idhaya Veenai
- Awards: Kalaimamani Award

G. Sakunthala (19 August 1932 - 8 November 2004) was an Indian actress who worked predominantly in Tamil films and plays. As she was a prominent member of MGR's drama troupe, Sakuntha appeared as a 'regular' cast member in many of MGR's movies, beginning from Manthiri Kumari, Thaaikkuppin Thaaram and Mannadhi Mannan. Thus, she maintained her standing as one of the leading actresses in Tamil film industry in the 50's and early 60's. She has acted more 150 films in the Tamil cinema industry.

== Early life ==
Sakunthala was born in 1932 into an Isai Vellalar family in Chidambaram Thanjavur District. Sakunthala's native is Chidambaram. She has acted in dramas with M.G.R, Sivaji Ganesan, R. S. Manohar and S. S Rajendran.

== Film career ==
Sakunthala entered the film industry with MGR as the heroine in Manthiri Kumari. Though she has acted in Kalpana, a Hindi film, Manthiri Kumari (1950) was her debut into Tamil cinema. After Manthiri Kumari, S. S. Rajendran paired opposite The two heroines in the movie 'Chinna Durai' starring T. R Mahalingam in dual roles. M. Karunanidhi is the author of both films After these films, Sakuntala did not get a chance to play the heroine. Her chances of being a comedian, supporting character, dancing in a few films were all there. She has acted almost 150 films in the Tamil cinema industry. Her last movie was Idhaya Veenai with MGR. After that she spent 20 years without acting in films.

== Awards ==
She got Kalaimamani Award recognized by the Government of Tamil Nadu in 1963.

== Death ==
She died on 8 November 2004 at the age of 72.

== Filmography ==
This is a partial filmography. You can expand it.

=== 1950s ===
Year	Film	Role	Notes
1950	Manthiri Kumari	Jeevarekha	Debut in Tamil
1951	Mohana Sundaram	Maragatham	
1952	Chinnadurai	Chandramani	
1952	Thai Ullam	Singari	
1954	Ammaiyappan	Muthayi	
1956	Thaaikkuppin Thaaram	Valli	
1957	Aaravalli	Maragathavalli	
1957	Chakravarthi Thirumagal		
1957	Raja Rajan		
1958	Mangalya Bhagyam		
1958	Nadodi Mannan	Nandini	
1959	Vaazha Vaitha Deivam		
1959	Odi Vilaiyaadu Paapa		

=== 1960s ===
Year	Film	Role	Notes
1960	Mannadhi Mannan	Mangayarkarasi	
1961	Thirudathe	Kaveri	
1962	Thayai Katha Thanayan	Bakkiyam	
1962	Sumaithaangi		
1963	Koduthu Vaithaval		
1963	Kattu Roja		
1963	Needhikkuppin Paasam	Janaki	
1963	Kaanchi Thalaivan	Ceylon King's wife	
1964	Karnan		
1964	Panakkara Kudumbam	Velayee	
1964	Thayin Madiyil		
1964	Poompuhar		
1965	Anbu Karangal	Uma	
1965	Kalangarai Vilakkam	Gowri	
1965	Ennathan Mudivu		
1965	Karthigai Deepam		
1966	Nee!	Chithra	
1966	Mahakavi Kalidas		
1966	Parakkum Paavai	Kannamma	
1966	Chinnanchiru Ulagam		
1967	Adhey Kangal		
1967	Thiruvarutchelvar		
1968	Uyarndha Manithan	Pankajam	
1968	Thirumal Perumai	Yasodha	
1968	Thillana Mohanambal		
1969	Nirai Kudam		
1969	Kulavilakku		
1969	Gurudhatchanai		
1969	Kaaval Dheivam		
1969	Annaiyum Pithavum		
1969	Subha Dinam	Gayathri	

=== 1970s ===
Year	Film	Role	Notes
1970	Puguntha Veedu		
1970	Vilaiyaattu Pillai	Queen	
1970	Ethiroli	Radhamani	
1970	Dharisanam		
1970	Thalaivan	Velamma	
1970	Navagraham	Saraswathi	
1971	Neerum Neruppum	The queen Karpagam	
1971	Annai Velankanni		
1971	Rickshawkaran		
1971	Kulama Gunama	Doctor	
1971	Muhammad bin Tughluq		
1971	Aathi Parasakthi		
1972	Appa Ta ta		
1972	Kurathi Magan		
1972	Sange Muzhangu	Visalam	
1972	Deiva Sankalpam		
1972	Idhaya Veenai	Mangalam	Last Movie
