= Sahodhari =

- Theatrical release poster
- Directed by: A. Bhimsingh
- Screenplay by: Murasoli Maran
- Story by: Krishnamurthi Puranic
- Produced by: Gubbi Veeranna; C.R. Basavaraj Manneth David
- Starring: K. Balaji; Devika; Rajasulochana; Prem Nazir; J. P. Chandrababu
- Cinematography: Madhav Papule
- Edited by: A. Bhimsingh
- Music by: R. Sudarsanam
- Production company: The Karnataka Film
- Release date: 11 December 1959
- Running time: 175 minutes
- Country: India
- Language: Tamil

Sahodari (transl. Sister) is a 1959 Indian Tamil-language drama film directed by A. Bhimsingh, starring K. Balaji, Rajasulochana, Prem Nazir, Devika and J. P. Chandrababu. It was released on 11 December 1959.

== Plot ==
Pazhani has two children — Chandiran and Meena. Meena is married. Chandiran loves Pankajam. His father and grandmother want him to marry a relative girl, Thangam, who is very helpful to the family. But Chandiran marries Pankajam defying them. Meena's husband spends money on drinking and gambling. He also cheats on her and develops a relationship with the milk woman. Meena is worried. Pankajam, who hailed from a rich family is not financially satisfied with Chandiran. She also starts suspecting Chandiran is having an affair with Thangam. Anandakonar, a milkman, who is also the fiancée of the milk woman finds out the extravagant life led by Meena's husband and his trying to seduce his fiancée, the milk woman. Anandakonar tries to bring a solution. How everything is solved forms the crux of the story.

== Cast ==
The list was adapted from the film's review article in The Hindu and the film's opening credits.

Male cast

- Balaji as Meena's husband
- Prem Nazir as Chandran
- Nagayya as Pazhani
- Muthuraman as Ravi
- Ashokan as Devika's brother
- J. P. Chandrababu as Anandakonar

Male support cast

- Rama Rao, C. V. V. Panthulu, Gemini Balu,
  Dhanapal, Ramaiah, Chandran, Jayasakthivel,
  M. M. Muthu, and S. L. Narayan.

Female cast

- Rajasulochana as Meena
- N. Lalitha as Thangam
- Devika as Pankajam
- Padmini Priyadarshini as Milkmaid
- S. R. Janaki
- Kamakshi
- Lakshmi (Maadi)

== Production ==
The film was produced by Gubbi Veeranna, C. R. Basavaraj, both from the Kannada cinema and Manneth David from Kerala alongside AVM Productions. The story of the film was written by Krishnamurthi Puranic, a Kannada writer. The film was made both in Kannada and Tamil. Murasoli Maran wrote the screenplay and dialogues for the Tamil version. The production was financed by A. V. Meiyappan.

Maran initially refused to write dialogues for the film after coming to know that Rajasulochana was the lead actress of the film who refused acting in his home production Kuravanji. Krishnan (of Krishnan–Panju) spoke to M. Karunanidhi who insisted Maran to write dialogues to which he agreed. After completing the film, Meiyappan found the film lacked an ingredient that would ensure box office success. The milkman character played by J. P. Chandrababu was included on his recommendation as an afterthought.

== Soundtrack ==
The music was composed by R. Sudarsanam and the lyrics were penned by Kannadasan.

Song	Singer	Duration
"Kan Paadum Pon Vanname"	A. M. Rajah & K. Jamuna Rani	03:15
"Naan oru Muttalunga"	J. P. Chandrababu	03:14
"Malarum Malarum Nallarame"	R. Balasaraswathi Devi	03:15
"Uravu Thanthaai Kannaale"	R. Balasaraswathi Devi	04:15
"Odi Odi Nee Ennodu Vaa"	K. Jamuna Rani	02:49
"Katti Thangam"	P. Susheela	04:03
"Nadagam Poal Mudindhade" ("Thirunaalai Kaanatha")	P. Susheela	04:57
