= Amudhavalli =

1959 film

- Poster
- Directed by: A. K. Sekar
- Screenplay by: R. Ramanathan
- Produced by: M. Somasundaram
- Starring: T. R. Mahalingam; M. N. Rajam; Tambaram Lalitha
- Cinematography: Rajagopal; G. K. Ramu
- Edited by: S. P. S. Veerappan
- Music by: Viswanathan–Ramamoorthy
- Production company: Jupiter Pictures
- Release date: 27 November 1959
- Running time: 198 minutes
- Country: India
- Language: Tamil

Amudhavalli is a 1959 Indian, Tamil-language film directed by A. K. Sekar. The film stars T. R. Mahalingam and M. N. Rajam. It was released on 27 November 1959.

== Cast and Crew ==
The details were adapted from the database of Film News Anandan.

=== Cast ===
- T. R. Mahalingam
- M. N. Rajam
- R. Nagendra Rao
- Tambaram Lalitha
- S. A. Natarajan
- Lakshmiprabha
- P. S. Venkatachalam
- Radhakrishnan

=== Crew ===
- Producer: M. Somasundaram
- Director: A. K. Sekar
- Story & Dialogues: R. Ramanathan
- Cinematography: Rajagopal, G. K. Ramu
- Editing: S. P. S. Veerappan
- Art: A. K. Sekar
- Choreography: P. Jayaram, D. C. Thangaraj
- Photography: Venkatachary, Vinayagam
- Studio: Neptune

== Soundtrack ==
Music was composed by the duo Viswanathan–Ramamoorthy.

Song	Singer/s	Lyricist	Duration (m:ss)
"Taththuva Kalaiyudan"	T. R. Mahalingam & S. C. Krishnan	Thanjai Ramaiah Dass	03:28
"Anbum Amaidhiyum"	T. R. Mahalingam & P. Leela	Thanjai Ramaiah Dass	04:01
"Pitham Theliya Marundhondru"	T. R. Mahalingam	Thanjai Ramaiah Dass	02:16
"Kannirandum Ondrai Onru"	T. R. Mahalingam	Kannadasan	03:58
"Paasaththaal Enai Yeendra"	T. R. Mahalingam	Pattukkottai Kalyanasundaram	
"Kaalam Ennum Oru Aazhak Kadalinil"	T. R. Mahalingam & P. Susheela	Pattukkottai Kalyanasundaram	03:24
"Aadai Katti Vandha Nilavo"	T. R. Mahalingam & P. Susheela	Pattukkottai Kalyanasundaram	04:07
"Kangal Rendum Vandu"	L. R. Eswari & P. Susheela	Pattukkottai Kalyanasundaram	04:50
"Kaalam Ennum Oru Aazhak Kadalinil"	P. Susheela	Pattukkottai Kalyanasundaram	01:44
"Jilu Jilukkum Pachai Malai"	T. V. Rathnam & A. P. Komala	Pattukkottai Kalyanasundaram	03:29
"Singaara Vadivamaana Thithikkum"	Sirkazhi Govindarajan & P. Leela	Udumalai Narayana Kavi	03:07
"Kollimalai Vaazhum"	L. R. Eswari	Muthukoothan	02:10
