= J. P. Chandrababu =

Indian comedian and actor

- Casual Poster of CB
- Born: 5 August 1927; Tuticorin, Madras Presidency, British India (now Thoothukudi, Tamil Nadu, India)
- Died: 8 March 1974 (aged 46); Madras (now Chennai), Tamil Nadu, India
- Occupations: Comedian, Actor, Playback singer, Film director
- Years active: 1947—1973

Joseph Panimayadas Chandrababu Rodriguez (1927–1974) was an Indian actor, comedian, playback singer and film director. His Chaplinesque-style on-screen movements and singing style made him popular from the late 1940s to the early 1970s. He had a mastery of the Madras Bashai, a dialect unique to the Madras region. His slapstick style of comedy has been emulated by subsequent actors. Many of his songs have remained popular.

== Early life ==
Chandrababu was born to a wealthy and eminent Christian Paravar family in 1927 at Tuticorin, India. His father, a freedom fighter, ran a paper called Sudhandhira Veeran which, along with the family assets, was seized by the British government in 1929 when he was arrested for participating in the satyagraha movement. He and the family were exiled to Colombo, Sri Lanka on his release, where his father worked for a Tamil newspaper. Chandrababu was educated at St. Joseph's College, Grandpass, Colombo and Aquinas College prior to his family moving once more, this time to Chennai in 1943. Here they lived in Triplicane, where his father worked for the Dinamani newspaper.

== Film career ==
Chandrababu was very passionate about acting despite opposition from his family members. His friend Ganapathy was the only person who motivated his acting skills. From his childhood, he was an expert in singing and whenever he got together with his friends or family, Chandrababu was asked to sing. Sri Lanka had a very western outlook in those times and Chandrabubu picked up on western styles of singing and dancing while there. In these early years Chandrababu made acquaintances of the actors Sriram, B. R. Panthulu and, through them, T. R. Mahalingam. He made his debut with a small role in the 1947 film Dhana Amaravathi but struggled thereafter to obtain parts.

He had spent many days starving himself and searching for a chance in films. In 1952, he attempted suicide by ingesting copper sulphate crystals in the canteen of Gemini Studios. He had written a suicide note explaining his reasons, which included that he had been unable to meet the director S. S. Vasan, and that his body was to be handed over to B. S. Ramaiah, the director of his only film at that date. Suicide was a criminal offence and so he was arrested. But when his case came to trial the judge asked him to prove his acting ability. Chandrababu rendered a Shakespearean monologue that so impressed the judge that he was not jailed. One of those who had assisted him in being taken to hospital at the time of his attempted suicide was Gemini Ganesan. When Vasan learned of this episode he gave Chandrababu a small role in the 1952 film Moondru Pillaigal, which impressed Vasan so much that he predicted a successful career. for him. Chandrababu also filmed Chinna Durai and Mohana Sundaram in the same year. It is claimed that, as of 2016, he remained the only person capable of yodelling in south Indian cinema,. Chandrababu loved western music and learned the art of yodelling by listening to singers such as Gene Autry and Hank Williams. In Chinna Durai, produced and directed by T. R. Mahalingam, he sang the song Poda Raja Podi Nadaya, the first time that yodelling had been heard in a South Indian film.Chandrababu was paid Rs 200 for his role in Mohana Sundaram. At his peak he was to command over Rs 100,000, becoming the first South Indian comedy actor to command such a sum.

When A. V. Meiyappan filmed Sahodhari, he found that it lacked an ingredient that would ensure box office success. Chandrababu was called and after watching the film he added a comedy track for himself, wrote it and also sang the song Naan oru muttalunga, converting the film into a hit. It was Chandrababu who first spoke and popularised the Madras Baashai in films. He learned this dialect from the rickshaw pullers and street vendors near his home in Triplicane and later in Mir Sahib Pet.

Sabaash Meena was one of the best Tamil comedy movies of its time, in which Chandrababu acted with Sivaji Ganesan, in dual roles. Chandrababu also established himself as a good singer. He was a playback singer rendering voice for himself in films. He lent his voice for S. Balachander for the song Kalyanam Kalyanam... Ullasamagave Ulagathil in Penn and for Sivaji Ganesan for the song Jolly Life Jolly Life in Kalyanam Panniyum Brammachari. Another song for comedian T.N. Sivadhanu is I Love You I Love You in Andhaman Kaidhi.

== Marriage ==
Chandrababu first met Sheila, an Anglo Indian and grand daughter of Coimbatore-based filmmaker Swamikannu Vincent at her residence and subsequently marriage was arranged in 1958. Famous film personalities and politicians including chief minister Kamaraj attended their marriage. The initial days of married life had gone well. One day Sheila confessed that she fell in love with another person. After learning this, Chandrababu was heartbroken and ended up in a confused state. In the subsequent days, she attempted suicide which was foiled by Chandrababu. Considering Sheila's fortune, they divorced formally. He continued to offer support to her until she left for London. After a few days, she married a doctor in London with the acceptance of Chandrababu by a letter communication. In a business mired by sycophancy, he chose not to mince his words and this restricted his opportunities from the 1960s onward. After this, he had decided to take a temporary break from his film career, and he went to Delhi without informing even his close friends. He spent those days consuming alcohol. Later he restarted his career in the industry despite his failed love and marriage.

== Financial misfortune and death ==
Chandrababu had arranged with a financier, to direct his first film Maadi Veettu Ezhai with M. G. Ramachandran as the hero. Eventually, he failed on this venture as Ramachandran failed to cooperate with him. The film project was also dropped. The reasons for Ramachandran's non-cooperation is well explained by script writer Aroordhas, in his 2002 memoirs Naan Muham Paartha Cinema Kannadigal. It's because Chandrababu became abusive towards Ramachandran's elder sibling M. G. Chakrapani. Chandrababu's final attempt was to direct and act in Thattungal Thirakkappadum in 1966; it was highly acclaimed for its cinematography but was not a box office success. MGR did offer a helping hand to him, by offering him a comedy slot in his own production, Adimai Penn released in 1969.

Due to his personal problems, Chandrababu spent his last days penniless. During his last years he stayed in a flat under support of A P Nagarajan, until his death on 8 March 1974. It was Sivaji Ganesan who arranged all his final rites and he was buried in Quibble Island, Chennai.

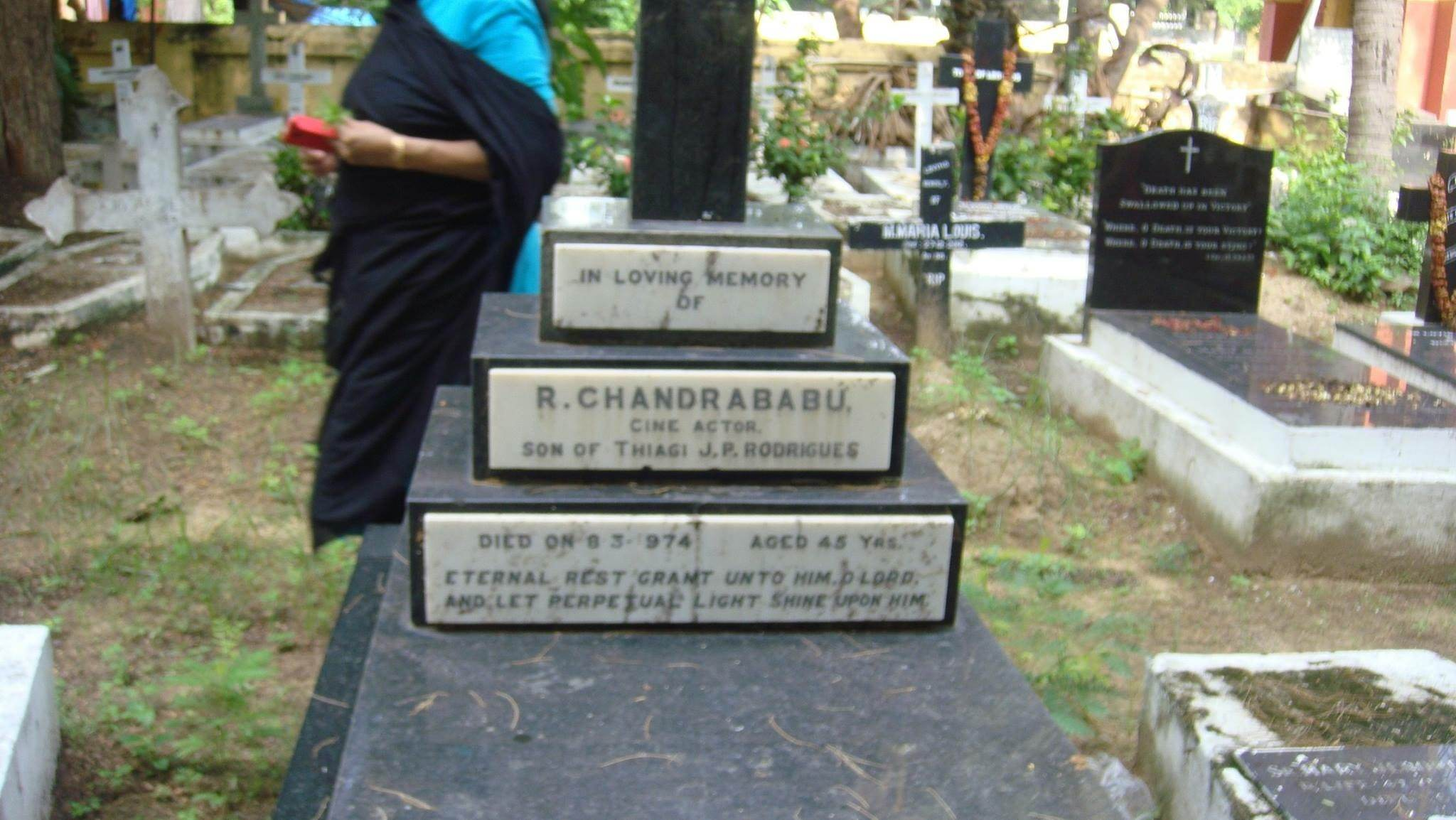
Chandrababu's grave in Quibble Island Cemetery.

== Filmography ==
Year	Film	Role	Notes
1947	Dhana Amaravathi		
1951	Mohana Sundaram	Gopu	
1952	Moondru Pillaigal	Music director	Simultaneously shot in Telugu as Mugguru Kodukulu
1952	Chinna Durai	Secretary	
1953	Kangal	Arivumani	
1953	Vazha Pirandhaval		
1954	Ratha Kanneer	Kantha's assistant	
1954	Bedara Kannappa	Tribal dancer	
1955	Gulebakavali	Gulam	
1955	Maaman Magal	Thandavam	
1955	Nalla Thangal		
1956	Marma Veeran		
1957	Mahadevi	Mariappan	
1957	Pudhaiyal	Thukkaram	
1957	Pudhumai Pithan	Arivumani	
1957	Pathini Deivam		
1957	Manamagan Thevai	Chandrababu	
1958	Pathi Bakthi	Kalaipithan	
1958	Kathavarayan	Mannaru	
1958	Nadodi Mannan	Sagayam	
1958	Sabaash Meena	Shekar & Mookan	
1959	Sahodhari	Anandakonar	
1959	Pandithevan		
1959	Naan Sollum Ragasiyam	Doctor Shailak	
1959	Maragatham	Gundan	
1960	Kavalai Illaadha Manithan	Muthu	
1960	Petra Manam		
1961	Sri Valli	Valli's brother	
1961	Kumara Raja		
1962	Paadha Kaanikkai	Veerasamy Pillai's son	
1962	Annai	Dayanidhi	
1962	Policekaran Magal	Maari	
1962	Bandha Pasam	Vasu	
1962	Senthamarai		
1963	Kadavulai Kanden	Valli's brother	
1963	Yarukku Sontham		
1964	Aandavan Kattalai	Chitti Babu	
1966	Thattungal Thirakkappadum	Adaikalam	Also director
1967	Valiba Virundhu	Babu	
1968	Nimirndhu Nil		
1969	Adimaippen		
1970	Paadhukaappu		
1972	Neethi	Eattu Kannaiya	
1972	Raja	Pattabiraman/Seetharaman/Janakiraman	
1973	Bharatha Vilas	Doctor	

== Discography ==
He sang under almost all of the music directors of the 1950s till the early 1970s.

=== Music composers he sang for ===
- K. V. Mahadevan
- T. G. Lingappa
- G. Govindarajulu Naidu
- S. V. Venkatraman
- P. R. Mani
- S. Rajeswara Rao
- G. Ramanathan
- R. Sudarsanam
- Viswanathan–Ramamoorthy
- Vedha
- T. Chalapathi Rao
- S. M. Subbaiah Naidu
- C. N. Pandurangan
- Meenakshi Subramanyam
- T. R. Pappa
- M. S. Viswanathan

=== Playback singers he sang with ===
He sang memorable duets with mostly comical songs K. Jamuna Rani, L. R. Eswari, Jikki, P. Leela P. Susheela, A. P. Komala, Soolamangalam Rajalakshmi, A. G. Rathnamala, Manorama and K. Rani.

He also sang with other male singers such as T. M. Soundararajan, A. L. Raghavan, V. N. Sundaram, S. C. Krishnan, P. B. Sreenivas and T. G. Lingappa.

The following are some of Chandrababu's songs that have remained popular:

- All of the songs are in Tamil, except otherwise noted.

Year	Film	Song	Music	Co-singer
1947	Dhana Amaravathi	Unnalazhagirku Inai Ennatthai Solvadhu	K. V. Mahadevan	
1951	Mohana Sundaram	Hello My Dear Darling Hello My Rose Charming	T. G. Lingappa	
1951	Mohana Sundaram	Inbam Konjum Velai	T. G. Lingappa	Jikki
1952	Andhaman Kaidhi	I Love You..I Love You.. Aasaiyanene Un Mele	G. Govindarajulu Naidu	A. G. Rathnamala playback for T. N. Sivadhanu
1952	Chinna Durai	Poda Raja Podi Nadayaa	T. G. Lingappa	
1953	Kangal	Aalu Ganam Aanal Moolai Gaali	S. V. Venkatraman	
1953	Azhagi	Onnu Rendu Moonu Photo Ready	P. R. Mani	
1953	Vazha Pirandhaval	Cinema Kalaiyai Elidhaaga Enni	S. Rajeswara Rao & G. Ramanathan	
1954	Kalyanam Panniyum Brammachari	Jolly Life Jolly Life	T. G. Lingappa	playback for Sivaji Ganesan
1954	Penn	Kalyaanam Kalyaanam... Ullasamagave Ulagathil	R. Sudarsanam	playback for S. Balachander
1955	Gulebagavali	Paraanda Mannar Ellam.... Achi Nimirndha Vandi	Viswanathan–Ramamoorthy	A. G. Rathnamala
1955	Maaman Magal	Gova Maambazhame Malgova Maambazhame	S. V. Venkatraman	
1955	Nalla Thangal	Unnai Kandu Mayamgaadha Pergal Undo	G. Ramanathan	
1956	Marma Veeran	O Aiyaa O Ammaa	Vedha	K. Rani, S. C. Krishnan & Jikki
1956	Marma Veeran	Thillaalangadi Kuyile Adi	Vedha	P. Leela
1957	Mahadhevi	Un Thirumugathey Oru Mugamaa	Viswanathan–Ramamoorthy	A. G. Rathnamala
1957	Mahadhevi	Thanthanaa Thaalam Poduvom	Viswanathan–Ramamoorthy	A. G. Rathnamala
1957	Pudhaiyal	Unakkaaga Ellam Unakkaaga	Viswanathan–Ramamoorthy	
1957	Pudhaiyal	Hello My Dear Rani	Viswanathan–Ramamoorthy	A. L. Raghavan
1957	Pudhumai Pithan	Araichi Mani.... Thillaana Paatu Paadi Kullathaara	G. Ramanathan	Jikki
1957	Pathini Deivam	Aathukku Paalam Avasiyam	Viswanathan–Ramamoorthy	T. M. Soundararajan
1957	Manamagan Thevai	Bambara Kannaale	G. Ramanathan	
1957	Samaya Sanjeevi	Paper Paper	G. Ramanathan	
1958	Padhi Bhakti	Rock Rock Rock	Viswanathan–Ramamoorthy	V. N. Sundaram
1958	Padhi Bhakti	Indha Thinnai Paechu Veeranidam	Viswanathan–Ramamoorthy	T. M. Soundararajan
1958	Padhi Bhakti	Kosari Kosari	Viswanathan–Ramamoorthy	
1958	Padhi Bhakti (Telugu)	Rock Rock Rock	T. Chalapathi Rao	V. N. Sundaram
1958	Padhi Bhakti (Telugu)	Kosari Kosari	T. Chalapathi Rao	
1958	Kaathavaraayan	Jigu Jigu	G. Ramanathan	Jikki
1958	Kaathavaraayan	Thandhane Thana Thandhane	G. Ramanathan	
1958	Kaathavaraayan	Sangili Jingili...Vaarandi Vaaraandi Kutticchaatthaan	G. Ramanathan	S. C. Krishnan, A. G. Rathnamala & T. M. Soundararajan
1958	Nadodi Mannan	Thadukkaadhe Ennai Thadukkaadhe	S. M. Subbaiah Naidu	K. Jamuna Rani
1958	Sabaash Meena	Erungammaa Summaa Erungammaa	T. G. Lingappa	T. G. Lingappa & P. Susheela
1959	Sahodhari	Naan Oru Muttaalunga	R. Sudarsanam	
1959	Pandithevan	Nee Aadinal	C. N. Pandurangan & Meenakshi Subramanyam	K. Jamuna Rani
1959	Pandithevan	Solluradha Solliputten	C. N. Pandurangan & Meenakshi Subramanyam	
1959	Naan Sollum Ragasiyam	Vilaiyaadu Raajaa Vilaiyaadu	G. Ramanathan	A. P. Komala
1959	Maragadham	Kunguma Poove Konjum Puraave	S. M. Subbaiah Naidu	K. Jamuna Rani
1960	Kavalai Illaadha Manithan	Pirakkum Podhum Azhukindraai	Viswanathan–Ramamoorthy	
1960	Kavalai Illaadha Manithan	Kavalai Illaadha Manithan	Viswanathan–Ramamoorthy	
1960	Petra Manam	Paadi Paadi Paadi	S. Rajeswara Rao	Soolamangalam Rajalakshmi
1960	Petra Manam	Manathirkugantha Mayile	S. Rajeswara Rao	
1961	Sri Valli	Aiyo Machaan Mannaaru	G. Ramanathan	
1961	Kumara Raja	Aan Ondru Aada Penn Ondru Paada	T. R. Pappa	P. Leela
1961	Kumara Raja	Onnume Puriyalae Ulagathile	T. R. Pappa	
1961	Kumara Raja	Moodinaalum Thiranthaalum	T. R. Pappa	K. Jamuna Rani
1961	Kumara Raja	Ennai Paartha Kannu	T. R. Pappa	K. Jamuna Rani
1962	Paadha Kaanikkai	Kaadhal Enbadhu Edhu Varai	Viswanathan–Ramamoorthy	P. B. Sreenivas, P. Susheela & L. R. Eswari
1962	Paadha Kaanikkai	Thaniyaa Thavikkira Vayasu	Viswanathan–Ramamoorthy	
1962	Annai	Butthiyulla Manidharellaam	R. Sudarsanam	
1962	Policekaran Magal	Porandhaalum Aambalaiya Porakka Koodaadhu	Viswanathan–Ramamoorthy	L. R. Eswari
1962	Bandha Pasam	Eppo Vachikkalaam Eppadi Vachikkalaam	Viswanathan–Ramamoorthy	
1962	Senthamarai	Thangaadhamma Thangaadhu Samsaaram Thangaadhu	Viswanathan–Ramamoorthy	K. Jamuna Rani
1963	Kadavulai Kanden	Konjam Sindhikkanum	K. V. Mahadevan	L. R. Eswari
1963	Kadavulai Kanden	Ungal Kaigal Uyarattum	K. V. Mahadevan	P. B. Sreenivas
1963	Yarukku Sontham	Ennai Theriyalaiyaa	K. V. Mahadevan	
1963	Yarukku Sontham	Oho Meri Bul Bul	K. V. Mahadevan	K. Jamuna Rani
1964	Aandavan Kattalai	Sirippu Varudhu Sirippu Varudhu	Viswanathan–Ramamoorthy	
1965	Preminchi Pelli Chesuko (Telugu)		Viswanathan–Ramamoorthy & B. Shankar Rao	
1966	Thattungal Thirakkappadum	Kanmani Paappaa	M. S. Viswanathan	
1967	Hanthakuni Hatya (Telugu)		M. S. Viswanathan & Pamarthi	
1967	Valiba Virundhu	Ondra Kannu Doriya	R. Sudarsanam	
1967	Valiba Virundhu	Vaaliba Virundhu	R. Sudarsanam	T. M. Soundararajan & L. R. Eswari
1968	Nimirndhu Nil	Pudichalum Pudhicha Puliyankomba Pudicha	M. S. Viswanathan	L. R. Eswari
1970	Paadhukaappu	Nammal Ki Pyaari	M. S. Viswanathan	L. R. Eswari
1972	Needhi	Engaladhu Boomi	M. S. Viswanathan	T. M. Soundararajan, P. Susheela & Manorama
