= Odi Vilaiyaadu Paapa =

1959 film by Muktha Srinivasan

- Poster
- Directed by: V. Srinivasan
- Written by: K. Appannaraj
- Starring: S. S. Rajendran; B. Saroja Devi
- Cinematography: Sampath; E. N. Balakrishnan
- Music by: V. Krishnamoorthy
- Production company: Jagajothi Films
- Distributed by: Radhakrishna Films
- Release date: 25 September 1959
- Country: India
- Language: Tamil

Odi Vilaiyaadu Paapa (transl. Play around, child) is a 1959 Indian Tamil-language film directed by V. Srinivasan. The film stars S. S. Rajendran and B. Saroja Devi. It was released on 25 September 1959.

== Cast ==
Credits adapted from Saadhanaigal Padaitha thamizh thiraipada varalaru:

- S. S. Rajendran as Subramaniyan
- B. Saroja Devi as Bharathi
- P. K. Balachandran
- G. Sakunthala
- K. Mohan
- Santhi
- Sahadevan
- Angamuthu
- S. V. Sahasranamam
- K. Varalakshmi

== Production ==
Odi Vilaiyaadu Paapa shares its name with a poem written by Tamil poet Subramania Bharati. It was directed by V. Srinivasan (who later became popularly known as Muktha Srinivasan) and produced by the studio Jagajothi Films. The story and dialogues were written by K. Appannaraj, while the cinematography was handled by Sampath and E. N. Balakrishnan. The art director was Angamuthu, the editor was N. G. Rajan and the music director was V. Krishnamoorthy, while the lyrics were written by Kambadasan. Bharati was also credited as lyricist. The length of the film was 14,517 feet (4,425 m).

== Soundtrack ==
The music was composed by V. Krishnamoorthy.

Song	Singer/s	Lyricist	Duration (m:ss)
"Pachai Kuzhandhaiyadi Kannil"	Seerkazhi Govindarajan & Radha Jayalakshmi	Mahakavi Subramania Bharathiyar	05:27
"Kuyil Paadiyadhe"	P. Susheela	Kambadasan	02:55
"Odi Vilaiyaadu Paapa"	Seerkazhi Govindarajan	Mahakavi Subramania Bharathiyar	03:37
"Odi Vilaiyaadu Paapa" (pathos)	S. Janaki	Mahakavi Subramania Bharathiyar	03:18
"Kummiyadi Kummiyadi"	P. Susheela	Mahakavi Subramania Bharathiyar	02:55
"Paattu Mudiyum Munney"	P. B. Sreenivas	Kambadasan	03:31
"Vaavendru Azhaikkudhe Thennai"	Seerkazhi Govindarajan & P. Susheela	Kambadasan	04:57

== Release and reception ==
Odi Vilaiyaadu Paapa was released on 25 September 1959, and failed commercially. Srinivasa Rao, editor of Narada magazine criticised Srinivasan for directing the film to show his prowess, and not giving any less financially well-off person or newcomer the chance to direct.
