= T. S. Balaiah =

Tamil film actor

- டி. எஸ். பாலையா
- Born: 21 August 1912; Sundankottai, Tinnevely District, Madras Presidency, British India (now in Thoothukudi District, Tamil Nadu, India)
- Died: 22 July 1972 (aged 59); Madras (now Chennai), Tamil Nadu, India
- Occupation: Actor
- Years active: 1936–1972
- Spouses: Padmavati; Leelavati
- Children: 7 including Junior Balaiah (actor); Manochithra (actress)

Thirunelveli Subramaniyan Balaiah (21 August 1912 – 22 July 1972) was an Indian actor. He is best known for playing supporting roles in Tamil films. Born in Sundankottai, near Sathankulam in Thoothukudi, Balaiah was introduced to the cine field by director Ellis R. Dungan in Sathi Leelavathi (1936), along with M. G. Ramachandran, N. S. Krishnan and M. K. Radha. He was one of the very few actors who excelled as a villain, as well as in character roles and comic roles.

== Early life ==
Balaiah was born on 21 August 1912 in Sundankottai, a village near Sathankulam in present-day Thoothukudi district, Tamil Nadu

== Career ==
Being part of various drama troupes, Balaiah's career in films started with the 'Madurai Original Boys' drama company which had several talented youngsters who created history in Tamil cinema, including M. K. Radha, M. G. Ramachandran, and N. S. Krishnan. Balaiah began his film career through the Tamil film Sathi Leelavathi in 1936. Balaiah played first lead role in Mohini paired opposite Madhuri Devi, where he played an elder brother to V. N. Janaki and supporting role by M.G.R . He gained a lot of weight at the age of 40 in 1954, hence started getting more character roles. Among his villain roles, Ambikapathy 1937, Andhaman Kaithi, Madurai Veeran, Thaikkupin Tharam, Hello Mister Zamindar and Thiruvilaiyadal were critically acclaimed. Balaiah also excelled in comedy roles in movies such as Kavalai Illaadha Manithan, Kadhalikka Neramillai, Bama Vijayam and Thillana Mohanambal. Actor Sivaji Ganesan had once mentioned that Balaiah along with M. R. Radha was his most admired actor.

== Personal life ==
Balaiah had two wives (Padmavati, Leelavati) and seven Children among them Actress Manochithra is his daughter, while one of his sons Junior Balaiah has also appeared in films. One of his sons, Sai Baba, was part of MSV's troupe and sang a few songs.

== Partial filmography ==
Year	Film	Role	Notes
1972	Agathiyar		
1970	Ethiroli	Singapur Minor Balaiya	
1968	Thillana Mohanambal	Muthurakku	
1967	Ooty Varai Uravu	Vedachalam	
1967	Bama Vijayam	Ethiraj	
1966	Yarukaka Azhudan?		
1966	Sadhu Mirandal	Ramananda Bhagavathar	Special appearance
1965	Vaazhkai Padagu		
1965	Thiruvilayadal	Hemanatha Bagavathar	
1965	Ennathaan Mudivu?		
1965	Hello Mister Zamindar	Zamin Secretary	
1964	Karuppu Panam	Sattanathan	
1964	Kaadhalikka Neramillai	Vishwanathan	
1962	Kavitha	Malaiyappan	
1961	Thayilla Pillai	Pathanjali Sasthri	
1961	Palum Pazhamum	Chinnavar (Sivaji Ganesan's uncle)	
1961	Pavamanippu	Manickam Pillai	
1961	Kumara Raja	Wealthy man (Chandrababu's father)	
1966	Chavukkadi Chandrakantha		
1960	Kavalai Illaadha Manithan	Jamabulingam	
1960	Kalathur Kannamma	Ramalingam	
1960	Parthiban Kanavu	Marappa Bhupathi	
1959	Vaazha Vaitha Deivam	China Thambi	
1959	Paththarai Maathu Thangam		
1959	Orey Vazhi	Guest Appearance	
1959	Bhaaga Pirivinai	Vaithiyalingam Moopanar	
1958	Kathavarayan	Chinnan	
1958	Pathi Bakthi	Sanyasi	
1957	Neelamalai Thirudan	Police Inspector	
1957	Pudhaiyal	Ambalam	
1957	Allauddin Adhbhuta Deepam	Yakub	
1956	Kaalam Maari Pochu		
1956	Madurai Veeran	Thalapathi Marappan	
1955	Maaman Magal	Kanniyappan	
1955	Chella Pillai	Director Yaman	
1954	Nallakalam		
1954	Ratha Paasam	Madhu	
1953	Gunasagari	Nirguna	Kannada film
1953	Aasai Magan	Vikraman	Simultaneously shot in Malayalam
1951	Manamagal	Balu	
1950	Ezhai Padum Padu	Ramgopal	
1949	Velaikkari	Mani	
1947	Rajakumari	Prince Aalahaalan	
1946	Chitra	Sanjeevi	
1945	Meera	Jayaman	
1945	Burma Rani	Ranjith Singh	
1937	Ambikapathy	Rudrasenan	
1936	Sathi Leelavathi	Ramanathan	

== Death ==
Balaiah lived in T. Nagar locality of Madras (now Chennai), where he died on 22 July 1972 at the age of 59.
