= M. N. Rajam =

Indian actress

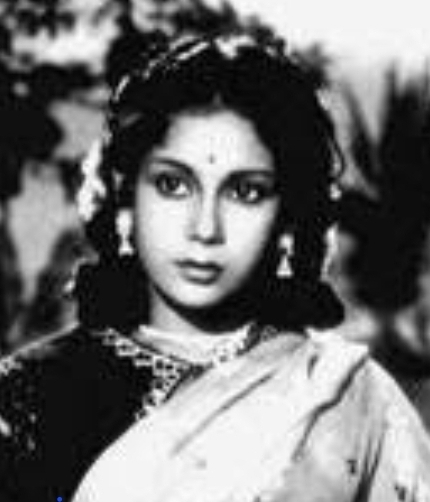
- Rajam seen in Ratha Kanneer Movie
- Born: Madurai Narasimha Achary Rajam; 28 July 1935 (age 91); Madurai, Tamil Nadu, India
- Occupation: Actress
- Years active: 1949-2007
- Spouse: A. L. Raghavan (m. 1960–2020)
- Children: 2

Madurai Narasimha Achary Rajam is an Indian actress, who works mainly in Tamil cinema. She is known for her roles in Ratha Kanneer, Pennin Perumai, Pudhayal, Thanga Padumai, Nadodi Mannan, Pasamalar, Thaali Bhagyam and Arangetram.

== Career ==
Rajam made her stage acting debut at the age of seven, and film acting debut as a child artist in 1949. Rajam played the vamp role in the Tamil classic Ratha Kanneer (1954), opposite M. R. Radha.

Subsequently Rajam acted with several leading actors including MGR in Nadodi Mannan, Sivaji Ganesan in Rangoon Radha, Gemini Ganesan, M. R. Radha, S. S. Rajendran, M. N. Nambiar and N. S. Krishnan. She married popular Tamil playback singer A. L. Raghavan on 2 May 1960.

She played supporting roles in films from 1970 to 1990. She started working in TV serials from 1995 and continued to work in films till 2014. In 1958 Rajam was booked by MGR for his second directorial venture Ponniyin Selvan. One of the first screen adaptations of Kalki Krishnamurthy's Ponniyin Selvan, the film had a huge ensemble cast consisting of Vyjayanthimala, Savitri, Gemini Ganesan, Padmini, Saroja Devi and Nagesh. In the film, she was given the role of Nandhini, the wife of Periya Pazhuvettaraiyar. However, in mid-1958 the film was shelved for unknown reasons. During the 1950s, Rajam was recognized for her negative shade roles in a few movies. Subsequently, she expanded her character roles to encompas positive roles as well, especially in movies like Arangetram.

== Filmography ==
=== 1940s ===
| Year | Title | Role | Notes |
|---|---|---|---|
| 1949 | Nallathambi | Girl at orphanage | Child Artist |
| 1949 | Mangayarkarasi | Heavenly Maiden | |

=== 1950s ===
| Year | Title | Role | Notes |
|---|---|---|---|
| 1952 | En Thangai | Servant Girl | |
| 1952 | Mappillai | Nurse | |
| 1952 | Penn Manam | | |
| 1953 | Manidhanum Mirugamum | | |
| 1954 | Ratha Kanneer | Kantha | |
| 1955 | Doctor Savithri | Vanaja | |
| 1955 | Kanavaney Kankanda Deivam | Mallika | |
| 1955 | Maheswari | | |
| 1955 | Mangaiyar Thilakam | Prabha | |
| 1955 | Methavigal | | |
| 1955 | Needhipathi | | |
| 1955 | Town Bus | Pankajam | |
| 1955 | Ulagam Palavidham | | |
| 1955 | Kathanayaki | | |
| 1956 | Alibabavum 40 Thirudargalum | Bulbul | |
| 1956 | Kula Dheivam | | |
| 1956 | Marma Veeran | Mohini | |
| 1956 | Mathar Kula Manickam | | |
| 1956 | Moondru Pengal | | |
| 1956 | Naane Raja | | |
| 1956 | Naan Petra Selvam | Dr. Sumathi | |
| 1956 | Nalla Veedu | | |
| 1956 | Paasavalai | | |
| 1956 | Pennin Perumai | Neela | |
| 1956 | Rambaiyin Kaadhal | Princess Suguna | |
| 1956 | Rangoon Radha | Thangam | |
| 1956 | Sadhaaram | | |
| 1957 | Baagyavathi | Bama | |
| 1957 | Mahadhevi | Princess Mangamma | |
| 1957 | Makkalai Petra Magarasi | Thangam | |
| 1957 | Mallika | | |
| 1957 | Mudhalali | Kokilam | |
| 1957 | Pudhaiyal | Menaka | |
| 1957 | Samaya Sanjeevi | | |
| 1958 | Annaiyin Aanai | Sundari | |
| 1958 | Kanniyin Sabatham | | |
| 1958 | Kaathavaraayan | Aravalli | |
| 1958 | Mangalya Bhagyam | | Guest role |
| 1958 | Nadodi Mannan | Queen Manohari | |
| 1958 | Nalla Idathu Sambandham | Maragatham | |
| 1958 | Neelavukku Niranja Manasu | | |
| 1958 | Padhi Bhakti | Marikozhundhu | |
| 1958 | Periya Kovil | | |
| 1958 | Pillai Kaniyamudhu | | |
| 1958 | Piya Milan | Mohini | |
| 1958 | Samopoorna Ramayanam | Shurpanakha | |
| 1958 | Thai Pirandhal Vazhi Pirakkum | Saradha | |
| 1958 | Thedi Vandha Selvam | | |
| 1958 | Thirumanam | Mullai | |
| 1959 | Abalai Anjugam | | |
| 1959 | Alli Petra Pillai | | |
| 1959 | Kalyanikku Kalyanam | Suseela | |
| 1959 | Amudhavalli | | |
| 1959 | Mamiyar Mechina Marumagal | | |
| 1959 | Naan Sollum Ragasiyam | Kala | |
| 1959 | Nalla Theerpu | Veena | |
| 1959 | Orey Vazhi | | |
| 1959 | Pennkulathin Ponvilakku | | |
| 1959 | Pudhumai Penn | | |
| 1959 | Sabhash Ramudu | Jayasri | Telugu film |
| 1959 | Sivagangai Seemai | | |
| 1959 | Thanga Padhumai | Princess | |
| 1959 | Thaiyaipola Pillai Noolaipola Selai | | |
| 1959 | Uzhavukkum Thozhilukkum Vandhanai Seivom | | |

=== 1960s ===
| Year | Title | Role | Notes |
|---|---|---|---|
| 1960 | Baghdad Thirudan | | |
| 1960 | Deivapiravi | Thilagam | |
| 1960 | Ellorum Innaattu Mannar | | |
| 1960 | Irumanam Kalanthal Thirumanam | | |
| 1960 | Kavalai Illaadha Manithan | Sivakami | |
| 1960 | Maa Babu | Maya | Telugu film |
| 1960 | Paavai Vilakku | Uma | |
| 1960 | Petra Manam | | |
| 1960 | Raja Desingu | Sengkamalam | |
| 1960 | Thangam Manasu Thangam | | |
| 1960 | Thangarathinam | Seethai | |
| 1960 | Thilakam | Thilakam | |
| 1960 | Uthami Petra Rathinam | | |
| 1960 | Veerakkanal | Porkodi | |
| 1960 | Vidivelli | | |
| 1961 | Anbu Magan | Maya | |
| 1961 | Anumanam | | Telugu film |
| 1961 | Kumara Raja | | |
| 1961 | Mamiyarum Oru Veetu Marumagale | | |
| 1961 | Pasamalar | Dr. Malathy | |
| 1961 | Thirudadhe | | |
| 1962 | Pirandha Naal | | |
| 1962 | Vadivukku Valaikaappu | | |
| 1962 | Raani Samyuktha | Bhawani | |
| 1966 | Thaali Bhagyam | Kamalam | |
| 1968 | Kallum Kaniyagum | | |

=== 1970s ===
| Year | Title | Role | Notes |
|---|---|---|---|
| 1973 | Arangetram | Visalam | |
| 1973 | Vandhale Magarasi | Mangamma | |
| 1973 | Ponvandu | Kamala | |
| 1973 | Veettukku Vandha Marumagal | | |
| 1974 | Athaiya Mamiya | Sumathi | |
| 1974 | Avalukku Nigar Avale | | |
| 1974 | Engamma Sapatham | | |
| 1974 | Kanmani Raja | | |
| 1974 | Naan Avanillai | | |
| 1974 | Ore Saatchi | | |
| 1974 | Pathu Madha Bandham | | |
| 1974 | Raja Nagam | | |
| 1974 | Sivagamiyin Selvan | | |
| 1975 | Aan Pillai Singam | | |
| 1975 | Karotti Kannan | | |
| 1975 | Mayangukiral Oru Maadhu | | |
| 1976 | Ore Thanthai | | |
| 1976 | Akka | | |
| 1976 | Annakili | | |
| 1976 | Mayor Meenakshi | | |
| 1976 | Oorukku Uzhaippavan | Maliga's mother | |
| 1976 | Nandha En Nila | | |
| 1976 | Varaprasadham | | |
| 1977 | Gaayathri | Gaayathri's mother | |
| 1977 | Thaliya Salangaiya | | |
| 1977 | Ilaya Thalaimurai | Kokila, Sakunthala's mother | |
| 1978 | Mangudi Minor | | |
| 1978 | Kaatrile Varum Geetham | | |
| 1979 | Kannil Theriyum Kathaikal | | |
| 1979 | Mayandi | | |
| 1979 | Thisai Maariya Paravaigal | | |
| 1979 | Velum Mayilum Thunai | Prohit's Wife | |

=== 1980s ===
| Year | Title | Role | Notes |
|---|---|---|---|
| 1984 | Naanayam Illatha Naanayam | Kannamma | |
| 1985 | Andha Oru Nimidam | | |
| 1985 | Urimai | | |
| 1986 | Nilave Malare | Raghu's aunt | |
| 1987 | Thirumathi Oru Vegumathi | Rajeswari, Karpagam's mother | |
| 1987 | Valayal Satham | | |
| 1988 | Penmani Aval Kanmani | Dilip's mother | |
| 1988 | Urimai Geetham | Thyagu's mother | |
| 1989 | Thendral Sudum | Baby sitter | |

=== 1990s ===
| Year | Title | Role | Notes |
|---|---|---|---|
| 1990 | Ethir Kaatru | Jana's mother | |
| 1991 | Aatha Un Koyilile | Kasthuri's mother | |
| 1991 | Thayamma | | |
| 1993 | Aadhityan | | |
| 1993 | En Idhaya Rani | Parvathi | |
| 1997 | Ullaasam | | |
| 1998 | Maru Malarchi | Manimaran's mother | |

=== 2000s ===
| Year | Title | Role | Notes |
|---|---|---|---|
| 2001 | Kutty | Ranganathan's mother | |
| 2002 | Pammal K. Sambandam | Grand-aunt | |
| 2003 | Winner | Sivagami | |
| 2005 | Anbe Vaa | Grandmother | |
| 2005 | Thirupaachi | Subha's grandmother | |
| 2006 | Imsai Arasan 23am Pulikesi | Maragathavalli | |
| 2007 | Marudhamalai | Divya's grandmother | |
