= Mamiyar Mechina Marumagal =

- Theatrical release poster
- Directed by: Krishnan–Panju
- Screenplay by: Kalaipithan
- Based on: Ganget Ghode Nhahale
- Produced by: Krishnan–Panju; M. Saravanan (co-producer)
- Starring: S. S. Rajendran; M. N. Rajam; G. Varalakshmi
- Cinematography: S. Maruthi Rao
- Edited by: Panjabi
- Music by: R. Sudarsanam
- Production company: AVM Productions
- Release date: 23 January 1959
- Country: India
- Language: Tamil

Mamiyar Mechina Marumagal (transl. The Daughter-in law praised by the Mother-in-law) is an Indian Tamil-language film produced by AVM Productions with S. S. Rajendran, M. N. Rajam and G. Varalakshmi starring. The film was released on 23 January 1959. It is a remake of the Marathi film Ganget Ghode Nhahale (1955). The film failed at the box office.

== Plot ==
Varalakshmi is an affluent woman, but has no biological children. She brings up her nephew S. S. Rajendran as her son. She wants Rajendran to marry and give her a grandchild. Rajendran is in love with M. N. Rajam, who is poor. Varalakshmi does not approve Rajendran to marry Rajam. However, Rajendran defies her and marries Rajam. Varalakshmi throws both of them out of her mansion. How they beget a child, win over Varalakshmi's love and become a happy family again forms the rest of the story.

== Cast ==
- S. S. Rajendran
- M. N. Rajam
- G. Varalakshmi

== Production ==
Mamiyar Mechina Marumagal is the first film where M. Saravanan took part in film production; he was credited as a production executive.

== Soundtrack ==
Music was composed by R. Sudarsanam.

Song	Singer/s	Lyricist	Duration
"Pathu Viral Modhiram"	M. L. Vasanthakumari	Kanchi Kamakshi Amman Virutham	02:25
"Ranga Ranga"	M. L. Vasanthakumari & Seergazhi Govindarajan	Kavi Rajagopal	02:45
"Maithunare Maithunare"	M. L. Vasanthakumari & A. P. Komala	Kavi Rajagopal	03:26
"Kanna Vaa Vaa Mani Vannaa"	M. L. Vasanthakumari	Kavi Rajagopal	
"Inge Irupatha"	M. L. Vasanthakumari	Kavi Rajagopal	03:24
"Ilavu Kaaththa Kili Pol Endhan"	M. L. Vasanthakumari	Kavi Rajagopal	03:13
"Mazhaiyum peyyudhu"	T. M. Soundararajan	Kavi Rajagopal	03:24
"Oru Pathu Maadham Uyir Kondu"	S. C. Krishnan	Udumalai Narayana Kavi	
"Vaakkaale Pirar Vaazhvai Kedukka"	T. M. Soundararajan	Udumalai Narayana Kavi	
"Yokkiyan Enbavan Ulagathile"	T. M. Soundararajan	Udumalai Narayana Kavi	03:20
"Panam Panam Pandhiyile"	T. M. Soundararajan	Udumalai Narayana Kavi	03:26

== Bibliography ==
- Saravanan, M. (2013) [2005]. AVM 60 Cinema (in Tamil) (3rd ed.). Rajarajan Pathippagam. OCLC 1158347612.
