= T. M. Soundararajan =

Indian musician and singer

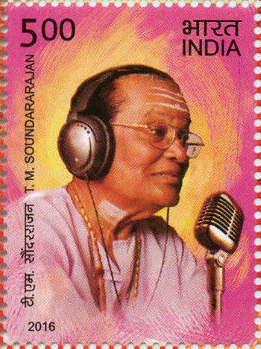
- T. M. Soundararajan

Background information
- Also known as: TMS
- Born: 24 March 1922; Madurai, Madras Presidency, British India
- Origin: Madurai, Madras Presidency, British India
- Died: 25 May 2013 (aged 91) Chennai, India
- Genres: Playback singing and classical musician
- Occupations: Singer and actor
- Instrument: Vocal
- Years active: 1946–2013

Thoguluva Meenatchi Iyengar Soundararajan (24 March 1922 – 25 May 2013), popularly known as TMS, was an Indian Carnatic musician and a playback singer in Tamil cinema. He sang over 10,138 songs from 3,162 films, including devotional, semi-classical, Carnatic, classical and light music songs, in a career spanning for over six decades . He gave classical concerts starting in 1943.

He lent his voice to actors and thespians in the Tamil film industry such as M. G. Ramachandran, Sivaji Ganesan, N. T. Rama Rao, Gemini Ganesan, S. S. Rajendran, Jaishankar, Ravichandran, A. V. M. Rajan, R. Muthuraman, Nagesh, Sivakumar, Kantha Rao, Rajkumar, Prem Nazir and A. Nageswara Rao. He also gave his voice to many new generation actors like Kamal Haasan, Rajinikanth, Vijayakanth, Satyaraj, Rajesh, Prabhu, and Vijaya Kumar, in addition to other known and unknown heroes and supporting actors like M.R. Radha, K R Ramaswami, T. Rajendar, V.K. Ramaswami, Thengai Sreenivasan, M.N. Nambiar, Thangavelu, Y.G. Mahendran, R.S. Manohar, S.V. Ashokan, Ranjan, Narasimha Bharathi, Sahasra Namam, T S Balayya, Jagayya, Nagayya, Thyagarajan, Sreenath, Shankar etc.

Besides primarily Tamil, he also sang in other languages including Sourashtra, Kannada, Telugu, Hindi, and Malayalam. He was a lyricist and music composer for many devotional songs. He was the music director for the film Bala Parikshai. His peak period as a male playback singer in the South Indian film industry was from 1955 to 1985. His first film song was in 1946, at the age of 24, and his last was with P. Susheela during 2010 at the age of 88. He was a devotee of Sathya Sai Baba and also sang songs about him. TMS died on 25 May 2013 at his residence in Mandaveli, Chennai due to illness. He was 91 years old.

== Early life ==
Soundararajan was born in Madurai, the second son of Meenakshi Iyengar and Venkatammaa on 24 March 1922. His elder brother was a scholar.

He trained his voice starting at age seven. He first studied Carnatic music from Chinnakonda Sarangapani Bhagavathar, a music teacher from Sourashtra High School, Madurai. Later, he learned Carnatic music from Arayakkudi Rajamani Iyer and started giving stage concerts at the age of 23. His first Carnatic musical concert was at SathGuru Samajam, Madurai in 1945 with violinist C. R. Mani and Mridangist S. S. Vijaya Ratnam accompanying him on the instruments. He started singing in stage concerts in the voice of the then-famous classical singer and actor M. K. Thyagaraja Bhagavathar.

=== Personal life ===
He married Sumithra in 1946 with whom he had three sons and three daughters. He lived in his home at Mandaveli, Chennai, Tamil Nadu until his death.

== Early work ==
Soundararajan was initially rejected by music composers and recording technicians because his voice was cracking and showed variation in higher pitches. He started working in the house of Sundar Rao Nadkarni, a director in the Central Studios, hoping to get a chance to sing in movies. The director recommended him to S. M. Subbaiah Naidu. In 1946, Naidu gave TMS an opportunity to sing five songs in the style of M. K. Thyagaraja Bhagavathar for a film of P. V. Narasimha Bharathi: Krishna Vijayam. Though the songs were noted since 1946, the film was released in 1950. One of his songs in that movie, "Raathey Ennai Vittu Pogathedi," became a hit and he was paid Rs 625. In the same year (1950), G. Ramanathan had him sing "Annamitta Veettiley" for an unknown actor in the film Manthiri Kumari. In 1951, TMS acted and sang "Theeraatha Thuyaralley" in the film Devagi again by G. Ramanathan.

In 1952, S. Dakshinamurthi gave TMS two duet songs in the movie Valaiyapathi – "Kulir Thaamarai Poigaiyai Kanden" and "Kulungidum Poovilellaam" – both with singer K. Jamuna Rani where TMS had an opportunity to sing songs written by the Tamil poet Bharathidasan. G. Ramanathan had TMS and K. Rani sing for Kalyani. In 1953, when Albela was dubbed into Tamil, the music director C. Ramchandra had two duets by TMS and M. S. Rajeswari: "Joraga Paadi Anbaaga Aadi" and "Thozhi Un Kann Edhire Kodi". Even though these songs were well received, there were no further chances for TMS for a while.

Then TMS went to His Master's Voice studio where K. V. Mahadevan recorded two devotional songs for which he was paid just Rs 80. Mahadevan told TMS to seek a chance with AVM Productions which was looking for new voices. TMS sang two songs for the film Chella Pillai. One was a solo ("Podanum Kulla Podanum") and the other was a duet with M.S. Rajeswari ("Naadu Nadakkira Nadayiley") under R. Sudarsanam's composition. The film was released in 1955. These music composers helped and trained the determined and ambitious TMS, who was able to overcome his voice problems to a good degree with time.

In 1954, A. Maruthakasi recommended TMS to sing in Aruna Pictures' Thookku Thookki. Till then C. S. Jayaraman used to sing playback for Sivaji Ganesan and Sivaji doubted the suitability of his voice. TMS offered to sing three songs free. TMS and Sivaji Ganesan were introduced to each other and, in the short conversation that followed, TMS studied the voice of Sivaji Ganesan. TMS sang "Sundari Soundari" and "Eraatha Malaithanile", closely imitating Sivaji Ganesan. G. Ramanathan, who was the music director for that film, was so pleased that he gave TMS the chance to sing all the Sivaji Ganesan songs in that production.

In the same year, T. R. Ramanna and T. R. Rajakumari started RR Films. As the film Koondukkili was under production stage, TMS had originally been given a chance to sing only in a chorus. Koondukkili was the only film where MGR and Sivaji acted together. Tanjai Ramayah Dass was very impressed with the golden voice of TMS and asked the story and dialogue writer Vindhan to give a chance to TMS to sing a full solo. TMS sang "Konjum Kiliyana Pennai" under K. V. Mahadevan's composition for Sivaji Ganesan.

When the song was recorded, MGR heard it and was so impressed that he wanted TMS to become his permanent playback singer. TMS was used in MGR's next movie Malaikkallan. Though he first recorded a song for the film Manthiri Kumari starring M. G. Ramachandran (MGR) in 1950, the song that announced the arrival of TMS on the big screen was "Ethanai Kaalamthaan Ematruvaar Indha Naattile" written by Tanjai Ramaiyah Dass and composed by S. M. Subbaiah Naidu. for M.G.R. During this period, TMS got an opportunity to sing in films like Kalvanin Kadhali, Vedan Kannappa, Rishi Sringer and Neela Malai Thirudan. TMS was the beneficiary of the first stereo recording in South India for a Tamil devotional song titled "Mannanalum Thiruchenthooril Mannaven".

From 1955 onward Sivaji insisted that TMS sing for him. Since then, TMS was mainly singing playback for the superstars MGR and Sivaji till the end of 1978 and 1995 respectively. He adopted styles while singing for each actor that synchronized very well with their voices.

His first musical concert abroad was in Malaysia in 1957. He continued to perform all over the world for almost 50 years till 2007, after which he restricted singing live on stage for health reasons. He has two sons who have voices similar to their father and have sung songs of TMS all over the world in concerts since 1980 till 2012, often with their father. The sons continue to do TMS concerts after the death of their father.

Though he has worked with all music directors of South India, most of his hit songs were composed by music directors M. S. Viswanathan, K. V. Mahadevan, and the Viswanathan–Ramamoorthy duo.

TMS starred as an actor in a few Tamil films such as Pattinathar, Arunagirinathar, Kallum Kaniyagum and Kaviraja Kalamegam. He produced the movie Kallum Kaniyagum with singer A. L. Raghavan. TMS appeared in guest roles in movies such as Devaki, Navagraha Nayaki, Pennarasi, Server Sundaram, Thiru Neelakandar, Swami Ayyappan, Shanmugapriya and Deivam.

After the release Thai Nadu and Ghana Paravai, he concentrated more on live concerts and sang in very few films. He was not happy with the lyrics and music style in the films and gave opportunities for newcomers. The film song, "Paatu Ondu Ketaal", performed by him for a Sri Lankan Tamil film named Sooriyan, was recorded in 2007 though it is yet to be released. He sang a song for an album in 2008 "Netrichutti" at the age of 86 and a song named "Kutraalam Aruvi" for the album Song for Daughter, under the music of L.Sakthinathan, which was very well recognized in the industry in 2008. The last film song during October 2010 with P. Susheela, composed by MSV for a film "Valibum Sutrum Ulagam" was well recognized irrespective of his 88 years of age. In 2010, he rendered his voice for the song "Pirapokum ella yuyirukum" in the Tamil Semmozhi Meet Anthem, which was composed by A. R. Rahman. He worked with 74 music directors ranging from S. M. Subbaiah Naidu to A. R. Rahman.

ka.

== Collaborations ==
=== Playback singers ===
He sang with other male singers, such as Ghantasala, Seerkazhi Govindarajan, P. B. Sreenivas, Balamurali Krishna, S. C. Krishnan, C. S. Jayaraman, Tharapuram Sundarajan, P. Jayachandran, Thiruchi Loganathan, V. N. Sundaram, A. L. Raghavan, K. J. Yesudas S. P. Balasubrahmanyam, Kovai Soundarrajan, Nagore E. M. Hanifa, Malaysia Vasudevan, U. R. Chandra, T. R. Mahalingam, T. A. Mothi, M. M. Muthu, Suguna Kumar, V. R. Rajagopalan, V. T. Rajagopalan, S. S. Mani Bhagavathar, G. K. Venkatesh, Sai Baba, S. V. Ponnuswami, J. V. Raghavalu, M. Raju, and Master Maharajan.

He sang duets with many female singers such as P. Susheela, P. Leela, Jikki, L. R. Eswari, S. Janaki, Vani Jairam, M. S. Rajeswari, K. Jamuna Rani, M. L. Vasanthakumari, U. R. Jeevarathinam, N. L. Ganasaraswathi, T. V. Rathnam, K.B.Sundarambal, Radha Jayalakshmi, Soolamangalam Jayalakshmi, Soolamangalam Rajalakshmi, R. Balasaraswathi Devi, A. P. Komala, P. Madhuri, K. Rani, B. S. Sasirekha, S. P. Sailaja, Lalitha, T. S. Bhagavathi, Suvarna, Vasantha, Sobha Chandrasekhar, L. R. Anjala, Kausalya, T. K. Kala, A. G. Ratnamala, Athmasha, Udutha Sarojam and R. Parvathi. Among them, he had the greatest collaboration with P. Susheela, with whom he sang 727 duets in Tamil.

He sang duets with singing actors such as J. P. Chandrababu, K. R. Ramasamy, V. Nagayya, P. Bhanumathi, S. Varalakshmi, Jayalalithaa, Manorama and Bharathi.

== Awards and honours ==
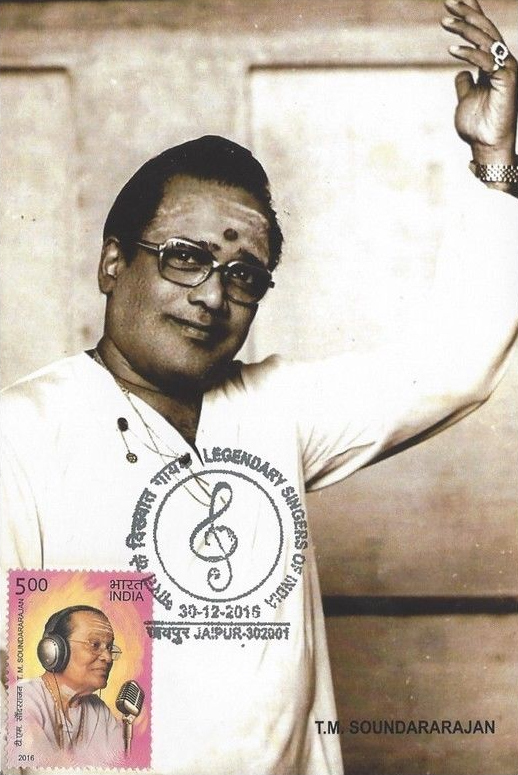
Soundararajan on a 2016 postcard from the series Legendary Singers of India

- Mathiyakathin Gana Thalaivar
- Kala Ratnam
- Gana Ratnam
- Arul Isai Sidhar
- Navarasa Bhava Nalina Gana Varshini
- Ganamritha Varshini
- Sathanai Chakravarhti
- Bharathiya Isai Kanal
- Bharathiya Isia Megham
- Gana Kuralon
- Then Isai Thendral
- Padma Shri (2003)
- Kalaimamani
- Padakar Thilakam
- Singha Kuralon
- Bharat Kalachar award
- Isai Chakravarthi
- Gnanakala Bharathi title
- Geethavaari title
- Karpagath Tharu Mannar
- Geetharanjana Vaarithi
- Arutpa Isaimani title
- Honorary Doctorate from Belgium.
- Kural Arasar Pattam
- EzhilIsai Mannar award from former Chief Minister M. Karunanidhi (1970)
- IsaiKadal Pattam from Kavi Arasar Kannadasan (1969)
- MGR Gold Medal award
- Former Chief Minister Arignar Annadurai Recognition Award (1964)
- Former Chief Minister Tamil Nadu Kamaraj Nadar Recognition Award
- Chief Minister Jayalalitha recognition award
- M. K. Thyagaraja Bhagavathar Lifetime Achievement Award, Tamil Nadu
- Tamil Nadu Musical Artist Lifetime Achievements Award (2005)
- Tamil Film Fans Award, 23 times in the early 1950s, 1960s and 1970s
- P. Susheela Award
- Mega TV Amutha Ghanam Recognition Award (2004)
- Lifetime achievement for MGR Memorial Award
- Lifetime achievement for Shivaji Memorial Award
- Sourashtra Community Recognition Award
- Karuppai Muppanar recognition award (1992)
- Periyar RamaSwami Naikkor recognition (1959)
- Raj TV for Raja Geetham Recognition Award (2006)
- Malaysian Tamil Fans Recognition Award
- Singapore Tamil Fans Recognition Award
- France, Germany, Switzerland, Italy, the Netherlands, Belgium and Austria Tamil Fans recognition award
- United Kingdom Tamil fans recognition award
- 20th Century Top Playback Singer from South African city mayor through Tamil fans, 1995
- USA Tamil fans from states recognition award
- Tamil Nadu Chief minister M. Karunanidhi recognition award at Madurai, Alagiri, 2010
- SriLankan awards from President, Prime Minister level through Tamil Group more than several times
- Tamil Fans recognition award from Canada
- Australian Tamil Fans appreciation awards in Sydney, Brisbane, Melbourne, and Perth
- Kairali Swaralaya Yesudas Lifetime Achievement Award, 2012
- Government of India released memorial stamp for 10 legendary singers of India, including TMS from south India
- Tamil Nadu State Awards, many many years continuously in the 1960s, 1970s and 1980s'
- Pesum Padam, award over 24 times, including consecutive annual awards from 1954 to 1969
- Former Chief Minister Tamil Nadu M.D. Bhakthavalsalam Recognition Award (1963)
- Tamil Nadu Iyal, Isai Nadaka Manthram, First Chairman.

== Discography ==
=== As composer ===
- Balaparitchai (1977)

=== As playback singer ===
Song	Film	Length (mm:ss)	Year	Music	Lyrics	Co-singer	Actor	Language
"Ubakaram Seibavarukke.... Annam Itta Vittile"	Manthiri Kumari		1950	G. Ramanathan	A. Maruthakasi	–		Tamil
"Eppadi Sakippadhu"	Krishna Vijayam	07.59	1950	C. S. Jayaraman & S. M. Subbaiah Naidu		Thiruchi Loganathan, S. S. Mani Bhagavathar, K. S. Angamuthu & A. L. Raghavan		Tamil
"Radhey Nee Ennai Vittu Pokaathadi"	Krishna Vijayam	03.40	1950	C. S. Jayaraman & S. M. Subbaiah Naidu		–	P. V. Narasimha Bharathi	Tamil
"Vaasuki Paambu Thaampaki"	Krishna Vijayam	05.00	1950	C. S. Jayaraman & S. M. Subbaiah Naidu		T. V. Rathnam	P. V. Narasimha Bharathi	Tamil
"Munnaalil Aandavane .. Ippo Theeradha Thuyaraale"	Devaki	03:59	1951	G. Ramanathan		–	T. M. Soundararajan	Tamil
"Namma Patthu Varusham Patta Kashtam"	Sarvadhikari	02.28	1951	S. Dakshinamurthi		–		Tamil
"Ini Pirivillamale Vaazhvom"	Kalyani	02.28	1952	G. Ramanathan & S. Dakshinamurthi	Kannadasan	–	M. N. Nambiar	Tamil
"Selvam Niraindhavar Endraale .. Thaai Paasamellaam"	Kalyani	02.28	1952	G. Ramanathan & S. Dakshinamurthi	Kannadasan	K. Rani	M. N. Nambiar	Tamil
"Vaazhvatharke Idam Kodukkum"	Kalyani	02.28	1952	G. Ramanathan & S. Dakshinamurthi	Kannadasan	–	M. N. Nambiar	Tamil
"Kulungidum Poovil Ellaam Thenaruvi"	Valaiyapathi		1952	S. Dakshinamurthi	Bharathidasan	K. Jamuna Rani	Valaiyapathi G. Muthukrishnan	Tamil
"Kulir Thaamarai Malar Poigai"	Valaiyapathi		1952	S. Dakshinamurthi	Bharathidasan	K. Jamuna Rani	Valaiyapathi G. Muthukrishnan	Tamil
"Joraka Paadi Anbaaka Aadi"	Nalla Pillai	03:31	1953	C. Ramchandra		M. S. Rajeswari	Bhagwan Dada	Tamil
"Thozhi Un Kann Edhiril Kodi"	Nalla Pillai	03:54	1953	C. Ramchandra		M. S. Rajeswari	Bhagwan Dada	Tamil
"Konden Arum Perum"	En Magal		1954	C. N. Pandurangan	Pavalar Velayuthasami	S. Varalakshmi	Ranjan	Tamil
"Raatthirikku Boovaavukku Laatteri"	Koondukkili	02.44	1954	K. V. Mahadevan	Thanjai N. Ramaiah Dass	K. V. Mahadevan & V. N. Sundharam	M. G. Ramachandran	Tamil
"Vaanga Ellorume Ondraagave"	Koondukkili	03.57	1954	K. V. Mahadevan	Ka. Mu. Sheriff	V. N. Sundharam, Radha Jayalakshmi & K. Rani	M. G. Ramachandran	Tamil
"Konjum Kiliyaana Pennai"	Koondukkili	05.21	1954	K. V. Mahadevan	Vindhan	–	Sivaji Ganesan	Tamil
"Kaayaadha Kaanagatthe"	Koondukkili	03.20	1954	K. V. Mahadevan	Thanjai N. Ramaiah Dass	V. N. Sundharam	M. G. Ramachandran	Tamil
"Thamizhan Endroru Inam"	Malaikkallan	03.24	1954	S. M. Subbaiah Naidu		–	M. G. Ramachandran	Tamil
"Ethanai Kaalam Thaan Yematruvar"	Malaikkallan	02.56	1954	S. M. Subbaiah Naidu		–	M. G. Ramachandran	Tamil
"Nalla Kalam porandhiduchu"	Mangalyam	03:31	1954	K. V. Mahadevan		–		Tamil
"Vazhvathu"	Mangalyam	02:00	1954	K. V. Mahadevan		–		Tamil
"Kooja Kooja"	Mangalyam	03:31	1954	K. V. Mahadevan		–		Tamil
"Paramparai Panakkaaran Pole"	Pudhu Yugam		1954	G. Ramanathan	Thanjai N. Ramaiah Dass	S. C. Krishnan & V. T. Rajagopalan		Tamil
"Eraadha Malaidhanile"	Thookku Thookki	03.12	1954	G. Ramanathan	Thanjai N. Ramaiah Dass	–	Sivaji Ganesan	Tamil
"Sundhari Soundhari Nirandhariye"	Thookku Thookki	04.55	1954	G. Ramanathan	A. Maruthakasi	P. Leela & A. P. Komala	Sivaji Ganesan	Tamil
"Pengalai Nambaadhe Kangale"	Thookku Thookki	02.06	1954	G. Ramanathan	Udumalai Narayana Kavi	–	Sivaji Ganesan	Tamil
"Abaaya Arivippu Aiyaa Abaaya Arivippu"	Thookku Thookki	02.12	1954	G. Ramanathan	Thanjai N. Ramaiah Dass	–	Sivaji Ganesan	Tamil
"Kuranginilirundhu Pirandhavan Manidhan"	Thookku Thookki	05.14	1954	G. Ramanathan	Udumalai Narayana Kavi	P. Leela, A. P. Komala & V. N. Sundharam	Sivaji Ganesan	Tamil
"Sattaam Pillaiyai.... Poongkavin Neengaadha"	Thookku Thookki	01.21	1954	G. Ramanathan	Thanjai N. Ramaiah Dass	–	Sivaji Ganesan	Tamil
"Kanvazhi Pugundhu Karutthinil Kalandha"	Thookku Thookki	03.07	1954	G. Ramanathan	A. Maruthakasi	M. S. Rajeswari	Sivaji Ganesan	Tamil
"Aanum Pennai Azhagu Seivadu Aadai"	Thookku Thookki	03.44	1954	G. Ramanathan	Udumalai Narayana Kavi	–	Sivaji Ganesan	Tamil
"Maayi Mahamaayi.... Aadhi Parameswariye"	Doctor Savithri	06.24	1955	G. Ramanathan	Udumalai Narayana Kavi	A. G. Rathnamala	–	Tamil
"Kaalam Varugudhu Nalla Kaalam Varugudhu"	Kalvanin Kadhali		1955	G. Govindarajulu Naidu & Ghantasala		–	Sivaji Ganesan	Tamil
"Ezhuthi Sellum Vidhiyin Kai"	Kalvanin Kadhali		1955	G. Govindarajulu Naidu & Ghantasala		-	Sivaji Ganesan	Tamil
"Manadhil Urudhi Vendum"	Kalvanin Kadhali	02.51	1955	G. Govindarajulu Naidu & Ghantasala	Mahakavi Bharathiyar	P. Bhanumathi	Sivaji Ganesan	Tamil
"Manadhil Urudhi Vendum"	Kalvanin Kadhali	00.32	1955	G. Govindarajulu Naidu & Ghantasala	Mahakavi Bharathiyar	–	Sivaji Ganesan	Tamil
"Valaipugum Podhe Thalaivaangum Paambe"	Kalvanin Kadhali	03.32	1955	G. Govindarajulu Naidu & Ghantasala		–	Sivaji Ganesan	Tamil
"Engirundho Ingu Vandha Radhiye"	Mullaivanam	03.25	1955	K. V. Mahadevan	Ka. Mu. Sheriff	Radha Jayalakshmi	Sriram	Tamil
"Sariyendru Nee Oru"	Mullaivanam	03.25	1955	K. V. Mahadevan	Ka. Mu. Sheriff	Radha Jayalakshmi	Sriram	Tamil
"Uruvam Kandu Yen Manasu"	Needhipathi	03:16	1955	Viswanathan–Ramamoorthy	A. Maruthakasi	K. R. Ramasamy	T. S. Balaiah	Tamil
"Panjayaththukku Vaa Pulle"	Valliyin Selvan		1955	P. S. Anantharaman	Kothamangalam Subbu	T. V. Rathnam		Tamil
"Azhuvadhaa Illai Sirippadhaa"	Pennin Perumai	04.22	1956	B. N. Rao, A. Rama Rao	Thanjai N. Ramaiah Dass	P. Susheela	Gemini Ganesan	Tamil
"Nanaayam Manushanukku"	Amara Deepam	02.43	1956	T. Chalapathi Rao	K. S. Gopalakrishnan	–	Sivaji Ganesan	Tamil
"Nadodikkottam Nannga Thiillelelo"	Amara Deepam	05.41	1956	T. Chalapathi Rao	Udumalai Narayana Kavi	A. P. Komala, Seerkazhi Govindarajan & T. V. Rathnam	Sivaji Ganesan	Tamil
"Ammaiyappa Unnai"	Kokilavani		1956	G. Ramanathan	Lakshmanadas	–		Tamil
"Thaditha Or Maganai Thandhai"	Kokilavani		1956	G. Ramanathan	Ramalinga Swamigal	–		Tamil
"Ponggi Varum Pudhu Nilavee"	Sadhaaram	03.11	1956	G. Ramanathan		P. Bhanumathi	Gemini Ganesan	Tamil
"Annaiye Kaaliyamma Eeswari"	Sadhaaram	05.46	1956	G. Ramanathan		V. T. Rajagopalan, A. P. Komala & A. G. Rathnamala	Gemini Ganesan	Tamil
"Ninaindhu Ninaindhu Nenjam Urugudhe"	Sadhaaram	03.11	1956	G. Ramanathan	A. Maruthakasi	–	Gemini Ganesan	Tamil
"Pudhumai Enna Solven"	Sadhaaram	03.24	1956	G. Ramanathan		–	Gemini Ganesan	Tamil
"Putrile Pambirukkum.... Kottaiyile Oru Kaalatthile"	Tenali Raman		1956	Viswanathan–Ramamoorthy	Kannadasan	V. Nagayya	Sivaji Ganesan	Tamil
"Manushanai Manushan Saapiduraandaa"	Thaikkupin Tharam	04:18	1956	K. V. Mahadevan		–	M. G. Ramachandran	Tamil
"Aahaa Nam Aasai Niraiverumaa"	Thaikkupin Tharam	03:02	1956	K. V. Mahadevan		P. Bhanumathi	M. G. Ramachandran	Tamil
"Unnaamal Urangaamal Uyirodu Mandraadi"	Thaikkupin Tharam		1956	K. V. Mahadevan		–	M. G. Ramachandran	Tamil
"Thandhayaipppol.... Annaiyum Pidhaavum Munnari Dheivam"	Thaikkupin Tharam	03:11	1956	K. V. Mahadevan		–	M. G. Ramachandran	Tamil
"Thendrale Vaaraayo"	Vazhvile Oru Naal	03.27	1956	T. G. Lingappa	Ku. Sa. Krishnamurthy	U. R. Jeevarathinam	Sivaji Ganesan	Tamil
"Maanameellam Ponna Pinn"	Aaravalli	02:17	1957	G. Ramanathan		Thiruchi Loganathan	–	Tamil
"Anuragadha Amaravathi"	Rathnagiri Rahasya	04:47	1957	T. G. Lingappa		P. Leela	Udaykumar	Kannada
"Kalyaana Namma"	Rathnagiri Rahasya	03:41	1957	T. G. Lingappa		P. Leela	Udaykumar	Kannada
"Varum Pagaivar Padai Kandu"	Ambikapathy		1957	G. Ramanathan		–	Sivaji Ganesan	Tamil
"Amaravathiye En Aasai Kaniyamudhe"	Ambikapathy		1957	G. Ramanathan		–	Sivaji Ganesan	Tamil
"Ambuliyai Kuzhambaakki Aravinda Rasamodu Amudhum Serththu"	Ambikapathy		1957	G. Ramanathan		–	Sivaji Ganesan	Tamil
"Itta Adi Nova Eduththa Adi Koppalikka"	Ambikapathy		1957	G. Ramanathan		–	Sivaji Ganesan	Tamil
"Kannile Iruppathenna Kanni Ilamaane"	Ambikapathy		1957	G. Ramanathan		–	Sivaji Ganesan	Tamil
"Aaya Kalaigal Arubathunaanginaiyum"	Ambikapathy		1957	G. Ramanathan		–	Sivaji Ganesan	Tamil
"Sindhanai Sei Maname"	Ambikapathy		1957	G. Ramanathan		–	Sivaji Ganesan	Tamil
"Vadivelum Mayilum Thunai"	Ambikapathy		1957	G. Ramanathan		–	Sivaji Ganesan	Tamil
"Thamizh Maalai Thanai Sooduvaar"	Ambikapathy		1957	G. Ramanathan		–	Sivaji Ganesan	Tamil
"Satre Sarindha Kuzhal Asaiaya"	Ambikapathy		1957	G. Ramanathan		–	Sivaji Ganesan	Tamil
"Natrenozhuga Nadana Singara"	Ambikapathy		1957	G. Ramanathan		–	Sivaji Ganesan	Tamil
"Maasila Nilave Nam Kaadhalil Magizhvodu"	Ambikapathy		1957	G. Ramanathan		P. Bhanumathi	Sivaji Ganesan	Tamil
"Vaada Malare Thamizhthene"	Ambikapathy		1957	G. Ramanathan		P. Bhanumathi	Sivaji Ganesan	Tamil
"Thaayatthu Thaayatthu"	Mahadhevi	03:01	1957	Viswanathan–Ramamoorthy	Kannadasan	–	M. G. Ramachandran	Tamil
"Kurukku Vazhiyil"	Mahadhevi	03:03	1957	Viswanathan–Ramamoorthy	Kannadasan	–	M. G. Ramachandran	Tamil
"Eru Poottuvom"	Mahadhevi	03:17	1957	Viswanathan–Ramamoorthy	Thanjai N. Ramaiah Dass	–	M. G. Ramachandran	Tamil
"Sevai Seivadhe Aanandham"	Mahadhevi	04:08	1957	Viswanathan–Ramamoorthy	Kannadasan	M. S. Rajeswari	M. G. Ramachandran	Tamil
"Manapaarai Maadu Katti"	Makkalai Petra Magarasi	03.25	1957	K. V. Mahadevan	A. Maruthakasi	–	Sivaji Ganesan	Tamil
"Poravale Poravale Ponnurangam"	Makkalai Petra Magarasi	03.15	1957	K. V. Mahadevan	Thanjai N. Ramaiah Dass	P. Bhanumathi	Sivaji Ganesan	Tamil
"Eri Karaiyin Mele"	Mudhalali	03.28	1957	T. G. Lingappa	Ku. Ma. Balasubramaniam	Seerkazhi Govindarajan	Sivaji Ganesan	Tamil
"Kunguma Pottukkaaraa"	Mudhalali	03.22	1957	T. G. Lingappa	Ka. Mu. Sheriff	M. S. Rajeswari	S. S. Rajendran	Tamil
"Seer Kondu ... Kandi Raaja"	Pudhaiyal	03.40	1957	Viswanathan–Ramamoorthy	Thanjai N. Ramaiah Dass	M. K. Punitham, S. J. Kantha	Sivaji Ganesan	Tamil
"Nallakalam Varugudhu "	Pudhaiyal	03.25	1957	Viswanathan–Ramamoorthy	Mahakavi Subramania Bharathiyar	P. Susheela	Sivaji Ganesan	Tamil
"Alangara Valliye"	Sabaash Meena	02.38	1957	T. G. Lingappa	Ku. Ma. Balasubramaniam	–	Sivaji Ganesan	Tamil
"Chitthiram Pesuthadi"	Sabaash Meena	03.18	1957	T. G. Lingappa	Ku. Ma. Balasubramaniam		Sivaji Ganesan	Tamil
"Oh Suyanalam Verimigu Maandhargale"	Sabaash Meena	03.19	1957		Ku. Ma. Balasubramaniam		Sivaji Ganesan	Tamil
"Chitthiram Pesuthadi"	Sabaash Meena	03.18	1957		Ku. Ma. Balasubramaniam		Sivaji Ganesan	Tamil
"Selvam Nilaiyallave Maname"	Sabaash Meena	02.00	1957		Ku. Ma. Balasubramaniam		Sivaji Ganesan	Tamil
"Gnaanakkanna Ezhundhiru"	Pathini Deivam		1957	Viswanathan–Ramamoorthy	Thanjai N. Ramaiah Dass	P. Leela	Gemini Ganesan	Tamil
"Thanni Kudam Kakkathile"	Pathini Deivam		1957	Viswanathan–Ramamoorthy	Thanjai N. Ramaiah Dass	P. Leela	Gemini Ganesan	Tamil
"Kasakkuma Illai Ruchikkuma"	Pathini Deivam	03:21	1957	Viswanathan–Ramamoorthy	Thanjai N. Ramaiah Dass	P. Susheela	Gemini Ganesan	Tamil
"Mohana Punnagai Eno"	Pathini Deivam	03:29	1957	Viswanathan–Ramamoorthy	Thanjai N. Ramaiah Dass	P. Susheela	Gemini Ganesan	Tamil
"Aathukku Paalam Avasiyam"	Pathini Deivam	03:41	1957	Viswanathan–Ramamoorthy	Thanjai N. Ramaiah Dass	J. P. Chandrababu	Gemini Ganesan	Tamil
"Ada Moona Asal Mukkaalanaa"	Kathavarayan	03.33	1958	G. Ramanathan	Thanjai N. Ramaiah Dass	Jikki	Sivaji Ganesan	Tamil
"Jaadhi Illai Madha Bedham Illaiye"	Kathavarayan	02.50	1958	G. Ramanathan	Thanjai N. Ramaiah Dass	P. Leela	Sivaji Ganesan	Tamil
"Niraiveruma Ennam Niraiveruma"	Kathavarayan	03.13	1958	G. Ramanathan	Thanjai N. Ramaiah Dass	P. Susheela	Sivaji Ganesan	Tamil
"Vaa Kalaba Mayile"	Kathavarayan	03.34	1958	G. Ramanathan	Thanjai N. Ramaiah Dass	–	Sivaji Ganesan	Tamil
"Dheviyaval Kirubai Vendum"	Kathavarayan	01.10	1958	G. Ramanathan	Thanjai N. Ramaiah Dass	–	Sivaji Ganesan	Tamil
"Sangili Jingili.... Vaarandi Vaaraandi Kutticchaatthaan"	Kathavarayan	06.55	1958	G. Ramanathan	Thanjai N. Ramaiah Dass	S. C. Krishnan, J. P. Chandrababu & A. G. Rathnamala	Sivaji Ganesan	Tamil
"Aararivil Orarivu Outtu"	Maganey Kel	03:24	1958	Viswanathan–Ramamoorthy	Pattukkottai Kalyanasundaram		S. S. Rajendran	Tamil
"Manavaraiyil ... Soothattam"	Maganey Kel	03:21	1958	Viswanathan–Ramamoorthy	Pattukkottai Kalyanasundaram	K. Jamuna Rani	S. S. Rajendran	Tamil
"Kannil Vandhu Minnal Pol"	Nadodi Mannan	04.24	1958	S. M. Subbaiah Naidu	Suratha	Jikki	M. G. Ramachandran	Tamil
"Thoongadhe Thambi Thoongadhe"	Nadodi Mannan	03.12	1958	S. M. Subbaiah Naidu	Pattukkottai Kalyanasundaram	–	M. G. Ramachandran	Tamil
"Summa Kedandha"	Nadodi Mannan	03.16	1958	S. M. Subbaiah Naidu	Pattukkottai Kalyanasundaram	P. Bhanumathi	M. G. Ramachandran	Tamil
"Senthamizhe Vanakkam"	Nadodi Mannan	03.06	1958	N. S. Balakrishnan	N. M. Muthukkoothan	–	M. G. Ramachandran	Tamil
"Ambigaye Eswariye"	Pathi Bakthi	03.26	1958	Viswanathan–Ramamoorthy	Pattukkottai Kalyanasundaram	P. Susheela	Sivaji Ganesan	Tamil
"Veedu Nokki Odi Vandha"	Pathi Bakthi	03.13	1958	Viswanathan–Ramamoorthy	Pattukkottai Kalyanasundaram	–	Sivaji Ganesan	Tamil
"Veedu Nokki Odi Vandha (pathos)"	Pathi Bakthi	03.13	1958	Viswanathan–Ramamoorthy	Pattukkottai Kalyanasundaram	–	Sivaji Ganesan	Tamil
"Dharmamembar.... Indha Thinnai Pechu"	Pathi Bakthi	05.20	1958	Viswanathan–Ramamoorthy	Pattukkottai Kalyanasundaram	J. P. Chandrababu	Sivaji Ganesan	Tamil
"Kokkara Kokkarako Sevale"	Pathi Bakthi	03.09	1958	Viswanathan–Ramamoorthy	Pattukkottai Kalyanasundaram	Jikki	Sivaji Ganesan	Tamil
"Naan Poren Munnaale"	Peria Koil		1958	K. V. Mahadevan		T. V. Rathnam	Prem Nazir	Tamil
"Thai Pirandhal Vazhi Pirakkum"	Thai Pirandhal Vazhi Pirakkum	04.08	1958	K. V. Mahadevan	A. Maruthakasi	P. Leela, S. V. Ponnusamy & L. R. Eswari	S. S. Rajendran	Tamil
"Nerangketta Nerathile .. Nenachathu Onnu"	Thai Pirandhal Vazhi Pirakkum	03.45	1958	K. V. Mahadevan	A. Maruthakasi	–	S. S. Rajendran	Tamil
"Eliyorai Thazhthi"	Thai Pirandhal Vazhi Pirakkum	02.47	1958	K. V. Mahadevan	Ku. Sa. Krishnamoorthi	R. Balasaraswathi Devi	S. S. Rajendran	Tamil
"Anbe Amudhey"	Uthama Puthiran	03.20	1958	G. Ramanathan	A. Maruthakasi	P. Susheela	Sivaji Ganesan	Tamil
"Mullai Malar Mele"	Uthama Puthiran	03.22	1958	G. Ramanathan	A. Maruthakasi	P. Susheela	Sivaji Ganesan	Tamil
"Yaaradi Nee Mohini"	Uthama Puthiran	07.06	1958	G. Ramanathan	Ku. Ma. Balasubramaniam	A. P. Komala, K. Jamuna Rani & Jikki	Sivaji Ganesan	Tamil
"Aanai Mugatthone.... Pillaiyaaru Koyilukku"	Bhaaga Pirivinai	04:24	1959	Viswanathan–Ramamoorthy	Pattukkottai Kalyanasundaram	P. Leela	Sivaji Ganesan	Tamil
"Paalootri Uzhavu.... Therodum Indha Seeraana"	Bhaaga Pirivinai	06:52	1959	Viswanathan–Ramamoorthy	Kannadasan	P. Leela	Sivaji Ganesan	Tamil
"Thalaiyaam Poo Mudichu"	Bhaaga Pirivinai	06:00	1959	Viswanathan–Ramamoorthy	Kannadasan	P. Leela	Sivaji Ganesan	Tamil
"En Piranthaai Magane"	Bhaaga Pirivinai	03:24	1959	Viswanathan–Ramamoorthy	Kannadasan	–	Sivaji Ganesan	Tamil
"Thai Porandha Vazhi Porakum"	Kalyanikku Kalyanam	03.20	1959	G. Ramanathan	Pattukkottai Kalyanasundaram	V. R. Rajagopalan, P. Leela, A. P. Komala, A. G. Rathnamala, K. Jamuna Rani & Kamala	S. S. Rajendran	Tamil
"Kuttukalai Sollanumaa"	Kalyanikku Kalyanam		1959	G. Ramanathan	Pattukkottai Kalyanasundaram	P. Leela, K. Jamuna Rani & Kamala	S. S. Rajendran	Tamil
"Varushathile Oru Naalu Deepavali"	Kalyanikku Kalyanam	03.25	1959	G. Ramanathan	Pattukkottai Kalyanasundaram	P. Leela & A. P. Komala	S. S. Rajendran	Tamil
"Unnai Ninaikkayile"	Kalyanikku Kalyanam	02.28	1959	G. Ramanathan	Pattukkottai Kalyanasundaram	–	S. S. Rajendran	Tamil
"Kannukkulle Unnai Paaru"	Maragatham	03.32	1959	S. M. Subbaiah Naidu	Ra. Balu	Radha Jayalakshmi	Sivaji Ganesan	Tamil
"Kaviri Paayum"	Maragatham	03.27	1959	S. M. Subbaiah Naidu	Ra. Balu	–	Sivaji Ganesan	Tamil
"Punnagai Thavazhum Madhimugamo"	Maragatham	03.54	1959	S. M. Subbaiah Naidu	Papanasam Sivan	Radha Jayalakshmi	Sivaji Ganesan	Tamil
"Munnariyum Deivamada"	Nalla Theerpu	02:24	1959	S. M. Subbaiah Naidu	Udumalai Narayana Kavi	–	Gemini Ganesan	Tamil
"Devathaal Aagaadhu Eninum"	Nalla Theerpu	01:18	1959	S. M. Subbaiah Naidu	Udumalai Narayana Kavi	–	–	Tamil
"Thaayin Mozhi Vazhiye"	Nalla Theerpu	01:08	1959	S. M. Subbaiah Naidu	Udumalai Narayana Kavi	–	–	Tamil
"Adhu Irundha Idhu Ille"	Nalla Theerpu	03:53	1959	S. M. Subbaiah Naidu	Pattukkottai Kalyanasundaram	–	Gemini Ganesan	Tamil
"Veerargal Vaazhum Dravidar Naattai"	Sivagangai Seemai	03.26	1959	Viswanathan–Ramamoorthy	Kannadasan	–	S. S. Rajendran	Tamil
"Kanavu Kandaen Naan Kanavu Kandaen"	Sivagangai Seemai	03.32	1959	Viswanathan–Ramamoorthy	Kannadasan	T. S. Bagavathi	S. S. Rajendran	Tamil
"Sivagangai Cheemai Sivagangai Cheemai"	Sivagangai Seemai	03.27	1959	Viswanathan–Ramamoorthy	Kannadasan	Seerkazhi Govindarajan & A. P. Komala	–	Tamil
"Chinnanchiru Vayadhu Mudhal"	Thaai Magalukku Kattiya Thaali	02.59	1959	T. R. Pappa		Jikki	M. G. Ramachandran	Tamil
"Nervazhiye Nadanthirundhaal"	Thaai Magalukku Kattiya Thaali	01.54	1959	T. R. Pappa		A. Nithyakala	M. G. Ramachandran	Tamil
"Sengarumbu Chaatrinile Then Kalandhu"	Thaai Magalukku Kattiya Thaali	05.20	1959	T. R. Pappa		A. Nithyakala	M. G. Ramachandran	Tamil
"Thanjavooru Bommaiyai Paarunggadi"	Thaai Magalukku Kattiya Thaali	05.49	1959	T. R. Pappa		Sirkazhi Govindarajan, L. R. Eswari, P. Susheela	M. G. Ramachandran	Tamil
"Ulladhai Sonna Paitthiyamunnu"	Thaai Magalukku Kattiya Thaali	03.33	1959	T. R. Pappa			M. G. Ramachandran	Tamil
"Maattuvandi Pootikittu"	Veerapandiya Kattabomman	02.53	1959	G. Ramanathan	Ku. Ma. Balasubramaniam	T. V. Rathnam	Sivaji Ganesan	Tamil
"Karantha Palaiyum"	Veerapandiya Kattabomman	02.45	1959	G. Ramanathan	Ku. Ma. Balasubramaniam	–	–	Tamil
"Kaaveri Thaan Singari"	Vaazha Vaitha Deivam	03:16	1959	K. V. Mahadevan		P. Susheela	Gemini Ganesan	Tamil
"Engi Malai Uchiyile"	Vaazha Vaitha Deivam	04.22	1959	K. V. Mahadevan		–	Gemini Ganesan	Tamil
"Chinnaala Patti"	Vaazha Vaitha Deivam	03.28	1959	K. V. Mahadevan		–	Gemini Ganesan	Tamil
"Anna Nadaikkaari"	Vaazha Vaitha Deivam	02.57	1959	K. V. Mahadevan		–	Gemini Ganesan	Tamil
"Vaazha Vaitha Deivam"	Vaazha Vaitha Deivam	03.13	1959	K. V. Mahadevan		L. R. Eswari	Gemini Ganesan	Tamil
"Unaikkandu Mayangaadha"	Kalathur Kannamma	06.58	1960	R. Sudarsanam	Kothamangalam Subbu	M. S. Rajeswari, A. P. Komala & S. C. Krishnan		Tamil
"Aadadha Manamum Undo"	Mannathi Mannan	03:59	1960	Viswanathan–Ramamoorthy	A. Maruthakasi	M. L. Vasanthakumari	M. G. Ramachandran	Tamil
"Achcham Enbadhu Madamaiada"	Mannathi Mannan	03:09	1960	Viswanathan–Ramamoorthy	Kannadasan	–	M. G. Ramachandran	Tamil
"Kaniya Kaniya Mazhalai Pesum"	Mannathi Mannan	03:57	1960	Viswanathan–Ramamoorthy	Kannadasan	P. Susheela	M. G. Ramachandran	Tamil
"Thandai Kondu"	Mannathi Mannan	08:02	1960	Viswanathan–Ramamoorthy	Kannadasan	–	M. G. Ramachandran	Tamil
"Ore Oru Oorile"	Padikkadha Medhai	04.09	1960	K. V. Mahadevan		Soolamangalam Rajalakshmi	Sivaji Ganesan	Tamil
"Seevi Mudichu Singarichu"	Padikkadha Medhai	03.58	1960	K. V. Mahadevan		–	Sivaji Ganesan	Tamil
"Ulladhai Solven"	Padikkadha Medhai	03.09	1960	K. V. Mahadevan		–	Sivaji Ganesan	Tamil
"Ore Oru Oorile"	Padikkadha Medhai	01.23	1960	K. V. Mahadevan		–	Sivaji Ganesan	Tamil
"Therku Podhigai Malai"	Petra Manam		1960	S. Rajeswara Rao	Bharathidasan	K. Jamuna Rani	S. S. Rajendran	Tamil
"Vaanil Muzhu Madhiyai"	Sivagami	03.40	1960	K. V. Mahadevan	Ka. Mu. Sheriff	–	Jaggayya	Tamil
"Angum Ingum Aaattam Poda"	Sivagami	03.33	1960	K. V. Mahadevan	Ka. Mu. Sheriff	Soolamangalam Rajalakshmi	Jaggayya	Tamil
"Edhaiyum Thaangum Manasu"	Thangarathinam	03.14	1960	K. V. Mahadevan	Thanjai N. Ramaiah Dass	K. Jamuna Rani	S. S. Rajendran	Tamil
"Thunbam Theeraadho, Thuyaram Maaraadho"	Thangarathinam	02.23	1960	K. V. Mahadevan	S. S. Rajendran	K. Jamuna Rani	S. S. Rajendran	Tamil
"Jaalamellaam Theriyudhu Aahaa"	Thangarathinam	04.45	1960	K. V. Mahadevan	A. Maruthakasi	K. Jamuna Rani	S. S. Rajendran	Tamil
"Kaaveri Karadhanile Kaaval Iruppavale"	Thilakam	01.25	1960	R. Sudarsanam	Kothamangalam Subbu	–	–	Tamil
"Maari Mutthu Maari"	Thilakam	01.17	1960	R. Sudarsanam	Kothamangalam Subbu	Soolamangalam Rajalakshmi	–	Tamil
"Bayaaskoppu Paatthiyaa Dappaskoppu Paatthiyaa"	Thilakam	01.46	1960	R. Sudarsanam	Kothamangalam Subbu	Soolamangalam Rajalakshmi	–	Tamil
"Thanjavoor Karagamadi Oh Mariammaa"	Thilakam	01.22	1960	R. Sudarsanam	Kothamangalam Subbu	Soolamangalam Rajalakshmi, S. C. Krishnan & L. R. Eswari	–	Tamil
"Chinna Payale Chinna Payale"	Arasilangkumari	03:39	1961	G. Ramanathan	Pattukottai Kalyanasundaram	–	M. G. Ramachandran	Tamil
"Etramunnaa Etram"	Arasilangkumari	03:11	1961	G. Ramanathan	Pattukottai Kalyanasundaram	Seerkazhi Govindarajan	M. G. Ramachandran	Tamil
"Oorvalamaaga Maappillai Pennum"	Arasilangkumari	02:19	1961	G. Ramanathan	R. Pazhanichami	Soolamangalam Jayalakshmi & P. Susheela	M. G. Ramachandran	Tamil
"Nandhavanatthil Or Aandi"	Arasilangkumari	00:54	1961	G. Ramanathan	Pattukottai Kalyanasundaram	–	M. G. Ramachandran	Tamil
"Maamaa Maamaa Maamaa"	Kumudham	05.39	1961	K. V. Mahadevan	A. Maruthakasi	K. Jamuna Rani	M. R. Radha & Kalapart Nadarajan	Tamil
"Kaayame Idhu Poiyadaa"	Kumudham	03.39	1961	K. V. Mahadevan		A. L. Raghavan	M. R. Radha	Tamil
"Singaara Velaa Vilaiyaada Vaa"	Malliyam Mangalam	03.27	1961	T. A. Kalyanam	V. Seetharaman	N. L. Ganasaraswathi		Tamil
"Ennai Yaar Endru"	Palum Pazhamum	03:50	1961	Viswanathan–Ramamoorthy	Kannadasan	P. Susheela	Sivaji Ganesan	Tamil
"Naan Pesa Ninaippathellam"	Palum Pazhamum	03:06	1961	Viswanathan–Ramamoorthy	Kannadasan	P. Susheela	Sivaji Ganesan	Tamil
"Naan Pesa Ninaippathellam (Sad)"	Palum Pazhamum	04:24	1961	Viswanathan–Ramamoorthy	Kannadasan	P. Susheela	Sivaji Ganesan	Tamil
"Paalum Pazhamamum"	Palum Pazhamum	03:23	1961	Viswanathan–Ramamoorthy	Kannadasan	–	Sivaji Ganesan	Tamil
"Ponaal Pogattum Poda"	Palum Pazhamum	06:10	1961	Viswanathan–Ramamoorthy	Kannadasan	–	Sivaji Ganesan	Tamil
"Enguminge Iyarkaiyin Kaadchi"	Panam Panthiyile		1961	K. V. Mahadevan	Ka. Mu. Sheriff	S. Janaki	S. S. Rajendran	Tamil
"Aadavenum Paadavenum Inbamaaga"	Panam Panthiyile		1961	K. V. Mahadevan	Ka. Mu. Sheriff	–	S. S. Rajendran	Tamil
"Irukkum Idaththai Viddu Illaatha Idathilellaam"	Panam Panthiyile		1961	K. V. Mahadevan	Ka. Mu. Sheriff	–	S. S. Rajendran	Tamil
"Thattaan Kadaiyile Thaaliyirukku"	Panam Panthiyile		1961	K. V. Mahadevan	Ka. Mu. Sheriff	Soolamangalam Rajalakshmi		Tamil
"Kallum Kallum Modhumpothu Kanal Pirakkuthu"	Panam Panthiyile		1961	K. V. Mahadevan	Ka. Mu. Sheriff	P. Susheela	S. S. Rajendran	Tamil
"Engalukkum Kaalam Varum"	Pasamalar	03:30	1961	Viswanathan–Ramamoorthy	Kannadasan	P. Susheela	Sivaji Ganesan, Gemini Ganesan	Tamil
"Malargalai Pol Thangai (Sad)"	Pasamalar	01:58	1961	Viswanathan–Ramamoorthy	Kannadasan	–	Sivaji Ganesan, Gemini Ganesan	Tamil
"Malargalai Pol Thangai"	Pasamalar	05:24	1961	Viswanathan–Ramamoorthy	Kannadasan	–	Sivaji Ganesan, Gemini Ganesan	Tamil
"Malarnthum Malaradha"	Pasamalar	05:10	1961	Viswanathan–Ramamoorthy	Kannadasan	P. Susheela	Sivaji Ganesan, Gemini Ganesan	Tamil
Ellorum Kondaduvom	Pava Mannippu	04:44	1961	Viswanathan–Ramamoorthy	Kannadasan	Nagore E. M. Hanifa	Sivaji Ganesan, Gemini Ganesan	Tamil
"Paalirukkum Pazham Irukkum"	Pava Mannippu	03:27	1961	Viswanathan–Ramamoorthy	Kannadasan	P. Susheela	Sivaji Ganesan, Gemini Ganesan	Tamil
"Saaya Veeti"	Pava Mannippu	03:57	1961	Viswanathan–Ramamoorthy	Kannadasan	L. R. Eswari	Sivaji Ganesan, Gemini Ganesan	Tamil
"Silar Siripar Silar Azhuvar"	Pava Mannippu	05:24	1961	Viswanathan–Ramamoorthy	Kannadasan	–	Sivaji Ganesan, Gemini Ganesan	Tamil
"Vantha Naal Muthal"	Pava Mannippu	04:57	1961	Viswanathan–Ramamoorthy	Kannadasan	–	Sivaji Ganesan, Gemini Ganesan	Tamil
"Vantha Naal Muthal (Pathos)"	Pava Mannippu	04:54	1961	Viswanathan–Ramamoorthy	Kannadasan	G. K. Venkatesh	Sivaji Ganesan, Gemini Ganesan	Tamil
"Sindhithaal Sirippu Varum"	Sengamala Theevu	03.37	1961	K. V. Mahadevan	Thiruchi Thiyagarajan	–	C. L. Anandan	Tamil
"Pakalil Pesum Nilavinai Kanden"	Sengamala Theevu	03.11	1961	K. V. Mahadevan	Chennai Ekalaivan	S. Janaki	C. L. Anandan	Tamil
"Thirudaadhe Paapa Thirudaadhe"	Thirudadhe	03.21	1961	S. M. Subbaiah Naidu	Pattukkottai Kalyanasundaram	–	M. G. Ramachandran	Tamil
"Kallellam Manikka"	Aalayamani	05:00	1962	Viswanathan–Ramamoorthy	Kannadasan	L. R. Eswari	Sivaji Ganesan, S. S. Rajendran	Tamil
"Ponnai Virumbum"	Aalayamani	04:03	1962	Viswanathan–Ramamoorthy	Kannadasan	–	Sivaji Ganesan, S. S. Rajendran	Tamil
"Satti Sutthadhada"	Aalayamani	04:21	1962	Viswanathan–Ramamoorthy	Kannadasan	–	Sivaji Ganesan, S. S. Rajendran	Tamil
"Athi Kai Kai"	Bale Pandiya	05.23	1962	Viswanathan–Ramamoorthy	Kannadasan	P. B. Sreenivas, P. Susheela, K. Jamuna Rani	Sivaji Ganesan	Tamil
"Naan Enna Solliviten"	Bale Pandiya	03.58	1962	Viswanathan–Ramamoorthy	Kannadasan	–	Sivaji Ganesan	Tamil
"Neeye Unaku Endrum"	Bale Pandiya	06.32	1962	Viswanathan–Ramamoorthy	Kannadasan	M. Raju	Sivaji Ganesan	Tamil
"Vaazha Ninaithaal"	Bale Pandiya	04.45	1962	Viswanathan–Ramamoorthy	Kannadasan	P. Susheela	Sivaji Ganesan	Tamil
"Yaarai Enge Vaipadhendru"	Bale Pandiya	03.35	1962	Viswanathan–Ramamoorthy	Kannadasan	–	Sivaji Ganesan	Tamil
"Kavalaigal Kidaikattum"	Bandha Pasam		1962	Viswanathan–Ramamoorthy	Mayavanathan	P. B. Sreenivas	Sivaji Ganesan, Gemini Ganesan	Tamil
"Panthal Irunthal"	Bandha Pasam		1962	Viswanathan–Ramamoorthy	'Kavi' Rajagopal	S. Janaki	Sivaji Ganesan, Gemini Ganesan	Tamil
"Kannukkulle Onnirukku"	Kavitha		1962	K. V. Mahadevan	A. Maruthakasi	K. Jamuna Rani	M. R. Radha & Harban Lal	Tamil
"Ulle Irukkum Ponnammaa"	Kavitha		1962	K. V. Mahadevan	A. Maruthakasi	K. Jamuna Rani	M. N. Nambiar	Tamil
"Kuruvi Koottam Pola"	Kudumba Thalaivan	03:41	1962	K. V. Mahadevan	Kannadasan	–	M. G. Ramachandran	Tamil
"Yetho Yetho"	Kudumba Thalaivan	03:46	1962	K. V. Mahadevan	Kannadasan	P. Susheela	M. G. Ramachandran	Tamil
"Kattana Kattalagazhu"	Kudumba Thalaivan	03:22	1962	K. V. Mahadevan	Kannadasan	P. Susheela	M. G. Ramachandran	Tamil
"Maarathayya Maarathu"	Kudumba Thalaivan	03:26	1962	K. V. Mahadevan	Kannadasan	–	M. G. Ramachandran	Tamil
"Thirumanamam"	Kudumba Thalaivan	03:12	1962	K. V. Mahadevan	Kannadasan	–	M. G. Ramachandran	Tamil
"Sirikka Therindhaal Podhum"	Maadappura	03.59	1962	K. V. Mahadevan	A. Maruthakasi	Soolamangalam Rajalakshmi	M. G. Ramachandran	Tamil
"Oorukkum Theriyaadhu Yaarukkum Puriyaadhu"	Maadappura	04.16	1962	K. V. Mahadevan	A. Maruthakasi	Soolamangalam Rajalakshmi	M. G. Ramachandran	Tamil
"Aandavan Padaichan"	Nichaya Thaamboolam	05:13	1962	Viswanathan–Ramamoorthy	Kannadasan	–	Sivaji Ganesan, M.N. Nambiar & Others	Tamil
"Ithu Ver Ulagam"	Nichaya Thaamboolam	04:00	1962	Viswanathan–Ramamoorthy	Kannadasan	L. R. Eswari		Tamil
"Paavadai Dhavaniyil"	Nichaya Thaamboolam	04:26	1962	Viswanathan–Ramamoorthy	Kannadasan	–	Sivaji Ganesan & Jamuna	Tamil
"Padaithaane, Padaithaane Manithanai"	Nichaya Thaamboolam		1962	Viswanathan–Ramamoorthy	Kannadasan	–	Sivaji Ganesan & Jamuna	Tamil
"Ulagam Pirandhadhu Enakkaga"	Paasam	03.41	1962	Viswanathan–Ramamoorthy	Kannadasan	–	M. G. Ramachandran	Tamil
"Kannirunthum Kurudaai"	Pattinathar	2:40	1962	G. Ramanathan	Pattinathar	–	T. M. Soundararajan	Tamil
"Bakthi Kondavuduvom"	Pattinathar	3:05	1962	G. Ramanathan	–	–	T. M. Soundararajan	Tamil
"Nilave Nee Intha seithi"	Pattinathar	3:29	1962	G. Ramanathan	–	P. Leela	T. M. Soundararajan Gemini K. Chandrika	Tamil
"Enseyalavanthu"	Pattinathar	2:54	1962	G. Ramanathan	Pattinathar	–	T. M. Soundararajan	Tamil
"Iyirandu Thingalai"	Pattinathar	03:01	1962	G. Ramanathan	Pattinathar	–	T. M. Soundararajan	Tamil
"Munnai Itta Thee"	Pattinathar	01:00	1962	G. Ramanathan	Pattinathar	–	T. M. Soundararajan	Tamil
"Muraiyo Neethi Muraiyo"	Pattinathar	02:43	1962	G. Ramanathan	Pattinathar	–	T. M. Soundararajan	Tamil
"Onderendriu"	Pattinathar	03:23	1962	G. Ramanathan	Pattinathar	–	T. M. Soundararajan	Tamil
"Thayum Nee"	Pattinathar	03:20	1962	G. Ramanathan	Pattinathar	–	T. M. Soundararajan	Tamil
"Valal Mahavarinthu"	Pattinathar	02:51	1962	G. Ramanathan	Pattinathar	–	T. M. Soundarajan	Tamil
"Kappathum Param Ayya"	Pattinathar	01:00	1962	G. Ramanathan	Pattinathar	–	T. M. Soundararajan	Tamil
"Irukkum Idam"	Pattinathar	01:50	1962	G. Ramanathan	Pattinathar	–	T. M. Soundararajan	Tamil
"Oru Madamagum Oru"	Pattinathar	04:56	1962	G. Ramanathan	Pattinathar	–	T. M. Soundararajan	Tamil
"Paadinaar Kavignar Paadinaar"	Thendral Veesum	04:57	1962	Viswanathan–Ramamoorthy	Kannadasan	P. Susheela	Kalyan Kumar	Tamil
"Annan Kaattiya Vazhiyamma"	Padithaal Mattum Podhuma	03.32	1962	Viswanathan–Ramamoorthy	Kannadasan	–	Sivaji Ganesan	Tamil
"Naan Kavignanum Alla"	Padithaal Mattum Podhuma	02.52	1962	Viswanathan–Ramamoorthy	Kannadasan	–	Sivaji Ganesan	Tamil
"Nallavan Enakku"	Padithaal Mattum Podhuma	03.20	1962	Viswanathan–Ramamoorthy	Kannadasan	P. B. Sreenivas	Sivaji Ganesan	Tamil
"Ohohoho Manidhargale"	Padithaal Mattum Podhuma	03.18	1962	Viswanathan–Ramamoorthy	Kannadasan	–	Sivaji Ganesan	Tamil
"Pon Ondru Kanden"	Padithaal Mattum Podhuma	03.13	1962	Viswanathan–Ramamoorthy	Kannadasan	P. B. Sreenivas	Sivaji Ganesan	Tamil
"Kodi Asainthathum"	Paarthal Pasi Theerum	03.30	1962	Viswanathan–Ramamoorthy	Kannadasan	P. Susheela	Sivaji Ganesan	Tamil
"Pillaikku Thandhai Oruvan"	Paarthal Pasi Theerum]	03.01	1962	Viswanathan–Ramamoorthy	Kannadasan		Sivaji Ganesan	Tamil
"Ullam Yenbadhu"	Paarthal Pasi Theerum]	03.22	1962	Viswanathan–Ramamoorthy	Kannadasan		Sivaji Ganesan	Tamil
"Veedu Varai Uravu"	Paadha Kaanikkai	05.25	1962	Viswanathan–Ramamoorthy	Kannadasan		Gemini Ganesan	Tamil
"Idazh Irandum Paadattum"	Raani Samyuktha	03.14	1962	K. V. Mahadevan	Kannadasan	T. S. Bagavathi	M. G. Ramachandran	Tamil
"Nilavenna Pesum Kuyilenna Paadum"	Raani Samyuktha	02.46	1962	K. V. Mahadevan	Kannadasan	P. Susheela	M. G. Ramachandran	Tamil
"Oho Vennilaa O Vennilaa"	Raani Samyuktha	03.08	1962	K. V. Mahadevan	Kannadasan	P. Susheela	M. G. Ramachandran	Tamil
"Kaveri Karairukku"	Tháyai Kátha Thanayan	03:23	1962	K. V. Mahadevan	Kannadasan	P. Susheela	M. G. Ramachandran	Tamil
"Katti Thangam Vetti"	Tháyai Kátha Thanayan	03:43	1962	K. V. Mahadevan	Kannadasan	–	M. G. Ramachandran	Tamil
"Moodi Thirantha Imaigal"	Tháyai Kátha Thanayan	02:46	1962	K. V. Mahadevan	Kannadasan	P. Susheela	M. G. Ramachandran	Tamil
"Nadakkum Enbar"	Tháyai Kátha Thanayan	04:10	1962	K. V. Mahadevan	Kannadasan	–	M. G. Ramachandran	Tamil
"Maamaa Pillai Maappillai"	Aayiram Kaalathu Payir		1963	S. M. Subbaiah Naidu		S. Janaki		Tamil
"Pattu Ponnu Pattukitta"	Aayiram Kaalathu Payir		1963	S. M. Subbaiah Naidu		S. Janaki		Tamil
"Arivukku Virunthaagum"	Arivaali	03.55	1963	S. V. Venkatraman	A. Maruthakasi	–	Sivaji Ganesan	Tamil
"Pattupol Meni.... En Kobam Pollathadhu"	Arivaali	04.27	1963	S. V. Venkatraman	A. Maruthakasi	P. Bhanumathi	Sivaji Ganesan	Tamil
"Kadavul Irukkindran"	Anandha Jodhi	04:23	1963	Viswanathan–Ramamoorthy	Kannadasan	–	M. G. Ramachandran	Tamil
"Oru Thaai Makkal"	Anandha Jodhi	04:00	1963	Viswanathan–Ramamoorthy	Kannadasan	–	M. G. Ramachandran	Tamil
"Pala Pala"	Anandha Jodhi	03:06	1963	Viswanathan–Ramamoorthy	Kannadasan	–	M. G. Ramachandran	Tamil
"Paniyillatha Margazhiya"	Anandha Jodhi	03:31	1963	Viswanathan–Ramamoorthy	Kannadasan	P. Susheela	M. G. Ramachandran	Tamil
"Poiyiley Piranthu"	Anandha Jodhi	04:49	1963	Viswanathan–Ramamoorthy	Kannadasan	P. Susheela	M. G. Ramachandran	Tamil
"Nadanthu Vantha Padhaiyile"	Aasai Alaigal	04:26	1963	K. V. Mahadevan	–	–	S. S. Rajendran	Tamil
"Dharmam Thalai Kaakkum"	Dharmam Thalai Kaakkum	03:52	1963	K. V. Mahadevan	Kannadasan	–	M. G. Ramachandran	Tamil
"Hello Hello Sugama"	Dharmam Thalai Kaakkum	03:17	1963	K. V. Mahadevan	Kannadasan	P. Susheela	M. G. Ramachandran	Tamil
"Moodu Pani Kulireduththu"	Dharmam Thalai Kaakkum	03:30	1963	K. V. Mahadevan	Kannadasan	P. Susheela	M. G. Ramachandran	Tamil
"Oruvan Manathu"	Dharmam Thalai Kaakkum	03:22	1963	K. V. Mahadevan	Kannadasan	–	M. G. Ramachandran	Tamil
"Paravaigale"	Dharmam Thalai Kaakkum	03:10	1963	K. V. Mahadevan	Kannadasan	–	M. G. Ramachandran	Tamil
"Thottuvida"	Dharmam Thalai Kaakkum	03:50	1963	K. V. Mahadevan	Kannadasan	P. Susheela	M. G. Ramachandran	Tamil
"Enathu Raaja Sabaiyile"	Kalyaniyin Kanavan	03:14	1963	S. M. Subbaiah Naidu	Kannadasan	P. Susheela	Sivaji Ganesan	Tamil
"Unakka Theriyadhu"	Kalyaniyin Kanavan	03:22	1963	S. M. Subbaiah Naidu	Kannadasan	P. Susheela	Sivaji Ganesan	Tamil
"Kan Kavarum Silaiye"	Kaanchi Thalaivan	03.26	1963	K. V. Mahadevan	K. D. Santhanam	–	M. G. Ramachandran, S. S. Rajendran	Tamil
"Makkal Oru"	Kaanchi Thalaivan	03.11	1963	K. V. Mahadevan	Alangudi Somu	–	M. G. Ramachandran, S. S. Rajendran	Tamil
"Ninaithu Vandha"	Kaanchi Thalaivan	02.57	1963	K. V. Mahadevan	Alangudi Somu	–	M. G. Ramachandran, S. S. Rajendran	Tamil
"Oru Kodiyil"	Kaanchi Thalaivan	03.45	1963	K. V. Mahadevan	Alangudi Somu	P. Susheela	M. G. Ramachandran, S. S. Rajendran	Tamil
"Vaanathil Varuvathu"	Kaanchi Thalaivan	04.09	1963	K. V. Mahadevan	Alangudi Somu	P. Susheela	M. G. Ramachandran, S. S. Rajendran	Tamil
"Ennamma Sowkkiyamma"	Koduthu Vaithaval	02.51	1963	K. V. Mahadevan	Kannadasan	P. Susheela	M. G. Ramachandran	Tamil
"Naan Yaar Theriyuma"	Koduthu Vaithaval	03.58	1963	K. V. Mahadevan	Kannadasan	–	M. G. Ramachandran	Tamil
"Thala Thalavena"	Koduthu Vaithaval	02.48	1963	K. V. Mahadevan	A. Maruthakasi	–	M. G. Ramachandran	Tamil
"Chandiranai Kanamal"	Kulamagal Radhai	03.28	1963	K. V. Mahadevan	Kannadasan	P. Susheela	Sivaji Ganesan	Tamil
"Radhe Unakku"	Kulamagal Radhai	02.52	1963	K. V. Mahadevan	A. Maruthakasi	–	Sivaji Ganesan	Tamil
"Ulagam Ethiley Adagud"	Kulamagal Radhai	03.30	1963	K. V. Mahadevan	Kannadasan	–	Sivaji Ganesan	Tamil
"Unnai Solli Kutramillai"	Kulamagal Radhai	03.32	1963	K. V. Mahadevan	Kannadasan	–	Sivaji Ganesan	Tamil
"Chinna Siriya Vannaparavai"	Kunkhumam	05:48	1963	K. V. Mahadevan	Kannadasan	S. Janaki	Sivaji Ganesan, S. S. Rajendran	Tamil
"Mayakkam Enadhu"	Kunkhumam	03:46	1963	K. V. Mahadevan	Kannadasan	–	Sivaji Ganesan, S. S. Rajendran	Tamil
"Poonthotta Kavalkara"	Kunkhumam	03:49	1963	K. V. Mahadevan	Kannadasan	P. Susheela	Sivaji Ganesan, S. S. Rajendran	Tamil
"Thungadha Kannendru"	Kunkhumam	03:59	1963	K. V. Mahadevan	Kannadasan	P. Susheela	Sivaji Ganesan, S. S. Rajendran	Tamil
"Aval Paranthu Ponale"	Paar Magaley Paar	05:19	1963	Viswanathan–Ramamoorthy		P. B. Sreenivas	Sivaji Ganesan	Tamil
"Neerodum Vaikaiyile"	Paar Magaley Paar	04:30	1963	Viswanathan–Ramamoorthy		P. Susheela	Sivaji Ganesan	Tamil
"Paar Magaley Paar"	Paar Magaley Paar	05:02	1963	Viswanathan–Ramamoorthy		–	Sivaji Ganesan	Tamil
"Enna Than Nadakkum"	Panathottam	03:18	1963	Viswanathan–Ramamoorthy	Kannadasan	–	M. G. Ramachandran	Tamil
"Javvathu Medai"	Panathottam	04:30	1963	Viswanathan–Ramamoorthy	Kannadasan	P. Susheela	M. G. Ramachandran	Tamil
"Oruvar Oruvarai"	Panathottam	04:37	1963	Viswanathan–Ramamoorthy	Kannadasan	L. R. Eswari	M. G. Ramachandran	Tamil
"Panathottam"	Panathottam	04:15	1963	Viswanathan–Ramamoorthy	Kannadasan	–	M. G. Ramachandran	Tamil
"Pesuvathu Kiliya"	Panathottam	04:06	1963	Viswanathan–Ramamoorthy	Kannadasan	P. Susheela	M. G. Ramachandran	Tamil
"Andru Vandhadhum (Happy)"	Periya Idathu Penn	03:09	1963	Viswanathan–Ramamoorthy	Kannadasan	P. Susheela	M. G. Ramachandran	Tamil
"Andru Vandhadhum (Pathos)"	Periya Idathu Penn	03:00	1963	Viswanathan–Ramamoorthy	Kannadasan	P. Susheela	M. G. Ramachandran	Tamil
"Avanukkena Thoongi"	Periya Idathu Penn	02:43	1963	Viswanathan–Ramamoorthy	Kannadasan	–	M. G. Ramachandran	Tamil
"Kannenna Kannenna"	Periya Idathu Penn	03:14	1963	Viswanathan–Ramamoorthy	Kannadasan	–	M. G. Ramachandran	Tamil
"Kattodu Kuzhalaada"	Periya Idathu Penn	04:58	1963	Viswanathan–Ramamoorthy	Kannadasan	P. Susheela, L. R. Eswari	M. G. Ramachandran	Tamil
"Paarappa Pazhaniappa"	Periya Idathu Penn	03:01	1963	Viswanathan–Ramamoorthy	Kannadasan	–	M. G. Ramachandran	Tamil
"Thulli Odum Kaalgal"	Periya Idathu Penn	03:29	1963	Viswanathan–Ramamoorthy	Kannadasan	P. Susheela	M. G. Ramachandran	Tamil
"Kadavul Manithanga"	Vanambadi	03:20	1963	K. V. Mahadevan	Kannadasan	–	S. S. Rajendran	Tamil
"Ettil Ezhuthi Vaithen"	Vanambadi	03:24	1963	K. V. Mahadevan	Kannadasan	L. R. Eswari(humming)	S. S. Rajendran	Tamil
"Aan Kaviyai Vella Vantha"	Vanambadi	05:30	1963	K. V. Mahadevan	Kannadasan	P. Susheela	S. S. Rajendran, Devika	Tamil
"Aaru Maname Aaru "	Andavan Kattalai		1964	Viswanathan–Ramamoorthy	Kannadasan	–	Sivaji Ganesan	Tamil
"Amaithiyaana Nathiyinile"	Andavan Kattalai		1964	Viswanathan–Ramamoorthy	Kannadasan	P. Susheela	Sivaji Ganesan, Devika	Tamil
"Muthaitharu"	Arunagirinathar	04:09	1964	G. Ramanathan & T. R. Pappa	Arunagirinathar	–	T. M. Soundararajan	Tamil
"Aadavendum Mayile	Arunagirinathar	04:03	1964	G. Ramanathan & T. R. Pappa	T. K. Krishnasamy	S. Janaki	T. M. Soundararajan, C. Lakshmi Rajyam	Tamil
"Nilavo Aval"	Arunagirinathar	03:23	1964	G. Ramanathan & T. R. Pappa	T. K. Krishnasamy	P. Susheela	T. M. Soundararajan, C. Lakshmi Rajyam	Tamil
"Senkol Ezh Adthu"	Arunagirinathar	06:11	1964	G. Ramanathan & T. R. Pappa	T. K. Krishnasamy	–	T. M. Soundararajan	Tamil
"Venkudai Viruthu"	Arunagirinathar	01:11	1964	G. Ramanathan & T. R. Pappa	T. K. Krishnasamy	–	T. M. Soundararajan	Tamil
"Thandayani Vendayam"	Arunagirinathar	02:56	1964	G. Ramanathan & T. R. Pappa	T. K. Krishnasamy	–	T. M. Soundararajan	Tamil
"Pakkarai Vichithiramani"	Arunagirinathar	02:38	1964	G. Ramanathan & T. R. Pappa	T. K. Krishnasamy	–	T. M. Soundararajan	Tamil
"Yethanai Piravi Petru"	Arunagirinathar	03:32	1964	G. Ramanathan & T. R. Pappa	T. K. Krishnasamy	–	T. M. Soundararajan	Tamil
"Santhana Pushpa"	Arunagirinathar	03:07	1964	G. Ramanathan & T. R. Pappa	T. K. Krishnasamy	–	T. M. Soundararajan	Tamil
"Madura Kavirajan"	Arunagirinathar		1964	G. Ramanathan & T. R. Pappa	T. K. Krishnasmay	–	T. M. Soundararajan	Tamil
"Aadum Pariveli"	Arunagirinathar	01:24	1964	G. Ramanathan & T. R. Pappa	T. K. Krishnasamy	–	T. M. Soundararajan	Tamil
"Nenjinile Ninaivu Mugam"	Chithraangi	04.26	1964	Vedha	Ku. Ma. Balasubramaniam	P. Susheela & K. Jamuna Rani	A. V. M. Rajan	Tamil
"Indru Vandha Sondhama"	Chithraangi	03.36	1964	Vedha	Ku. Ma. Balasubramaniam	P. Susheela	A. V. M. Rajan	Tamil
"Moondrezhuthil En"	Dheiva Thaai	03:08	1964	Viswanathan–Ramamoorthy	Vaali	–	M. G. Ramachandran	Tamil
"Indha Punnagai"	Dheiva Thaai	05:14	1964	Viswanathan–Ramamoorthy	Vaali	P. Susheela	M. G. Ramachandran	Tamil
"Vannakkili"	Dheiva Thaai	03:40	1964	Viswanathan–Ramamoorthy	Vaali	P. Susheela	M. G. Ramachandran	Tamil
"Oru Pennai Parthu"	Dheiva Thaai	04:37	1964	Viswanathan–Ramamoorthy	Vaali	–	M. G. Ramachandran	Tamil
"Yaarathu Yaarathu Thangama"	En Kadamai		1964	Viswanathan–Ramamoorthy		P. Susheela	M. G. Ramachandran	Tamil
"Ayiratthil Oruthiyamma Nee"	Kai Koduttha Dheivam	03.55	1964	Viswanathan–Ramamoorthy	Kannadasan		Sivaji Ganesan	Tamil
"Sindhu Nadhiyin Misai"	Kai Koduttha Dheivam	06.20	1964	Viswanathan–Ramamoorthy	Bharathiyar	L. R. Eswari & J. V. Raghavulu	Sivaji Ganesan	Tamil
"Aavo Gulaamiyaa"	Magaley Un Samathu		1964	G. K. Venkatesh		T. V. Rathnam	C. L. Anandan	Tamil
"Iravinil Aattam"	Navarathri		1964	K. V. Mahadevan		–	Sivaji Ganesan	Tamil
"Kelvi Piranthadhu"	Pachai Vilakku	05.53	1964	Viswanathan–Ramamoorthy	Kannadasan	–	Sivaji Ganesan, S. S. Rajendran	Tamil
"Olimayamana"	Pachai Vilakku	04.24	1964	Viswanathan–Ramamoorthy	Kannadasan	–	Sivaji Ganesan, S. S. Rajendran	Tamil
"Kuththu Vilakkeria"	Pachai Vilakku	03.42	1964	Viswanathan–Ramamoorthy	Kannadasan	P. Susheela	Sivaji Ganesan, S. S. Rajendran	Tamil
"Olimayamana Ethirkaalam"	Pachai Vilakku	05.25	1964	Viswanathan–Ramamoorthy	Kannadasan		Sivaji Ganesan, S. S. Rajendran	Tamil
"Tharaimel Pirakka"	Padagotti		1964	Viswanathan–Ramamoorthy	Vaali	–	M. G. Ramachandran	Tamil
"Thottal Poo Malarum"	Padagotti		1964	Viswanathan–Ramamoorthy	Vaali	P. Susheela	M. G. Ramachandran	Tamil
"Koduthellam Koduthaan"	Padagotti		1964	Viswanathan–Ramamoorthy	Vaali	–	M. G. Ramachandran	Tamil
"Kalyana Ponnu"	Padagotti		1964	Viswanathan–Ramamoorthy	Vaali	–	M. G. Ramachandran	Tamil
"Paatukku Patteduthu"	Padagotti		1964	Viswanathan–Ramamoorthy	Vaali	P. Susheela	M. G. Ramachandran	Tamil
"Naan Oru Kuzhandhai'	Padagotti		1964	Viswanathan–Ramamoorthy	Vaali	–	M. G. Ramachandran	Tamil
"Ithuvarai Neengal"	Panakkara Kudumbam	05.06	1964	Viswanathan–Ramamoorthy	Kannadasan	–	M. G. Ramachandran	Tamil
"Ondru Engal"	Panakkara Kudumbam	04.26	1964	Viswanathan–Ramamoorthy	Kannadasan	L. R. Eswari	M. G. Ramachandran	Tamil
"Pallakku Vanga"	Panakkara Kudumbam	04.31	1964	Viswanathan–Ramamoorthy	Kannadasan	–	M. G. Ramachandran	Tamil
"Parakkum Panthu"	Panakkara Kudumbam	04.20	1964	Viswanathan–Ramamoorthy	Kannadasan	P. Susheela	M. G. Ramachandran	Tamil
"Athai Magal Rathinathai"	Panakkara Kudumbam		1964	Viswanathan–Ramamoorthy	Kannadasan	–	M. G. Ramachandran	Tamil
"Paruvathil Konjam"	Panam Padaithavan		1964	Viswanathan–Ramamoorthy	Kannadasan	L. R. Eswari	M. G. Ramachandran	Tamil
"Ennai Mudhal Mudhalaaga"	Poompuhar	03.37	1964	R. Sudarsanam	Radha Manikam	S. Janaki	S. S. Rajendran	Tamil
"Kaaviri Penne"	Poompuhar	03.29	1964	R. Sudarsanam	Mayavanathan	P. Susheela	S. S. Rajendran	Tamil
"Engey Nimmadhi"	Puthiya Paravai	6:21	1964	Viswanathan–Ramamoorthy	Kannadasan	–	Sivaji Ganesan	Tamil
"Aha Mella"	Puthiya Paravai	4:12	1964	Viswanathan–Ramamoorthy	Kannadasan	–	Sivaji Ganesan	Tamil
"Adho Andha Paravai Pola"	Aayirathil Oruvan	05:03	1965	Viswanathan–Ramamoorthy	Kannadasan	–	M. G. Ramachandran, M.N. Nambiar & Others	Tamil
"Naanamo Innum Naanamo"	Aayirathil Oruvan	04:45	1965	Viswanathan–Ramamoorthy	Kannadasan	P. Susheela	M. G. Ramachandran & Jayalalithaa	Tamil
"Odum Maegangalae"	Aayirathil Oruvan	04:31	1965	Viswanathan–Ramamoorthy	Kannadasan	–	M. G. Ramachandran	Tamil
"Yaen Indra Kaelvi"	Aayirathil Oruvan	03:46	1965	Viswanathan–Ramamoorthy	Vaali	–	M. G. Ramachandran	Tamil
"Neeya Illai Naana(x2)"	Aasai Mugam	04:23	1965	S. M. Subbaiah Naidu	Vaali	P. Susheela	M. G. Ramachandran	Tamil
"Yaarukku Yaar Endru Theriyaadha"	Aasai Mugam	03:05	1965	S. M. Subbaiah Naidu	Vaali	P. Susheela	M. G. Ramachandran	Tamil
"Ennai Kadhalithal Mattum Pothuma"	Aasai Mugam	03:49	1965	S. M. Subbaiah Naidu	Vaali	P. Susheela	M. G. Ramachandran	Tamil
"thanai Periya (Innoruvar Vaedhanai)"	Aasai Mugam	04:24	1965	S. M. Subbaiah Naidu	Vaali	–	M. G. Ramachandran	Tamil
"Naal Oru Medai Pozhudhoru Nadippu"	Aasai Mugam	03:12	1965	S. M. Subbaiah Naidu	Vaali	–	M. G. Ramachandran	Tamil
"Kakithathil Kappal"	Anbu Karangal	04.27	1965	R. Sudarsanam	Vaali	–	Sivaji Ganesan	Tamil
"Onna Irukka Kathukanum"	Anbu Karangal	05.08	1965	R. Sudarsanam	Vaali	P. Susheela	Sivaji Ganesan	Tamil
"Naan Aanaiyitaal"	Enga Veettu Pillai	05:05	1965	Viswanathan–Ramamoorthy	Vaali	–	M. G. Ramachandran, M.N. Nambiar & Others	Tamil
"Kumari Pennin"	Enga Veettu Pillai	05:50	1965	Viswanathan–Ramamoorthy	Vaali	P. Susheela	M. G. Ramachandran & B. Saroja Devi	Tamil
"Naan Maanthoppil"	Enga Veettu Pillai	05:56	1965	Viswanathan–Ramamoorthy	Vaali	L. R. Eswari	M. G. Ramachandran & Rathna	Tamil
"Penn Ponaal"	Enga Veettu Pillai	04:13	1965	Viswanathan–Ramamoorthy	Vaali	P. Susheela	M. G. Ramachandran & B. Saroja Devi	Tamil
"Gnayiru Enbathu Kannaga	Kakkum Karangal	03:57	1965	K. V. Mahadevan	–	P. Susheela	S. S. Rajendran, C. R. Vijayakumari	Tamil
"Alli Thandu"	Kakkum Karangal	04:10	1965	K. V. Mahadevan	–	P. Susheela	S. S. Rajendran, C. R. Vijayakumari	Tamil
"Ponnezhil Pootadu"	Kalangarai Vilakkam	06.14	1965	M. S. Viswanathan	Panchu Arunachalam	P. Susheela	M. G. Ramachandran	Tamil
"Kattru Vaanga"	Kalangarai Vilakkam	04.19	1965	M. S. Viswanathan	Vaali	–	M. G. Ramachandran	Tamil
"Enna Uravo"	Kalangarai Vilakkam	04.57	1965	M. S. Viswanathan	Vaali	–	M. G. Ramachandran	Tamil
"Pallavan Pallavi"	Kalangarai Vilakkam	03.48	1965	M. S. Viswanathan	Vaali	–	M. G. Ramachandran	Tamil
"Kelamma Chinnaponnu"	Kanni Thaai	3.48	1965	K. V. Mahadevan	Panju Arunachalam	–	M. G. Ramachandran	Tamil
"Ammadi Thookamma"	Kanni Thaai	3.56	1965	K. V. Mahadevan	Panju Arunachalam	P. Susheela	M. G. Ramachandran	Tamil
"Maana Porantha"	Kanni Thaai	4.29	1965	K. V. Mahadevan	Panju Arunachalam	P. Susheela	M. G. Ramachandran	Tamil
"Endrum Pathinaru"	Kanni Thaai	3.34	1965	K. V. Mahadevan	Panju Arunachalam	P. Susheela	M. G. Ramachandran	Tamil
"Enna Paravai Siragadithu"	karthigai Deepam		1965	R. Sudarsanam		–	S. A. Ashokan	Tamil
"Kanni Nadhiyoram"	Neerkumizhi	3:13	1965	V. Kumar	Alangudi Somu	P. Susheela	Nagesh	Tamil
"Antha Maapilai"	Panam Padaithavan	4:39	1965	Viswanathan–Ramamoorthy	Vaali	P. Susheela	M. G. Ramachandran	Tamil
"Enakkoru Makan"	Panam Padaithavan	4:35	1965	Viswanathan–Ramamoorthy	Vaali	–	M. G. Ramachandran	Tamil
"Kannpona Pokkile"	Panam Padaithavan	5:11	1965	Viswanathan–Ramamoorthy	Vaali	–	M. G. Ramachandran	Tamil
"Maanicka Thottil"	Panam Padaithavan	4:19	1965	Viswanathan–Ramamoorthy	Vaali	P. Susheela, L. R. Eswari	M. G. Ramachandran	Tamil
"Paruvathil Konjam"	Panam Padaithavan	4:12	1965	Viswanathan–Ramamoorthy	Vaali	L. R. Eswari	M. G. Ramachandran	Tamil
"Pavalakodiyil"	Panam Padaithavan	5:00	1965	Viswanathan–Ramamoorthy	Vaali	L. R. Eswari	M. G. Ramachandran	Tamil
"Avallukum Thamizh"	Panchavarna Kili	3:56	1965	Viswanathan–Ramamoorthy	Vaali	–	Muthuraman	Tamil
"Aarodum Mannil"	Pazhani		1965	Viswanathan–Ramamoorthy		–	Sivaji Ganesan	Tamil
"Annan Ennada"	Pazhani		1965	Viswanathan–Ramamoorthy		–	Sivaji Ganesan	Tamil
"Ullathukkule"	Pazhani		1965	Viswanathan–Ramamoorthy		P. Susheela	Sivaji Ganesan	Tamil
"Idhayam Irukkindrathe"	Pazhani		1965	Viswanathan–Ramamoorthy		–	Sivaji Ganesan	Tamil
"Vazhdu Parkka Vendum"	Santhi		1965	Viswanathan–Ramamoorthy	Kannadasan	P. B. Sreenivas	Sivaji Ganesan, S. S. Rajendran	Tamil
"Yaarantha Nilavu"	Santhi		1965	Viswanathan–Ramamoorthy	Kannadasan		Sivaji Ganesan	Tamil
"Paarthal Pasumaram"	Thiruvilaiyadal		1965	K. V. Mahadevan	Kannadasan	–	Sivaji Ganesan	Tamil
"Paattum Naane"	Thiruvilaiyadal		1965	K. V. Mahadevan	Kannadasan	–	Sivaji Ganesan	Tamil
"Achemenge"	Vallavanukku Vallavan	03:40	1965	Vedha	–	–	S. A. Ashokan	Tamil
"Or Aayiram Paarvaiyile"	Vallavanukku Vallavan	05:48	1965	Vedha	Kannadasan	–	S. A. Ashokan	Tamil
"Paaradi Kanne Konjam"	Vallavanukku Vallavan	06:55	1965	Vedha	Kannadasan	Sirkazhi Govindarajan, P. Susheela	R. S. Manohar S. A. Ashokan& P. Susheela	Tamil
"Manam Ennum Medai"	Vallavanukku Vallavan	03:30	1965	Vedha	Kannadasan	P. Susheela	S. A. Ashokan, Manimala	Tamil
"Ivaloru Azhagiya"	Kathal Paduthum Padu	03:12	1966	T. R. Pappa	Mayavanathan	P. Susheela	Jaishankar	Tamil
"Anbe Vaa"	Anbe Vaa	04:23	1966	M. S. Viswanathan	Vaali	–	M. G. Ramachandran	Tamil
"Naan Paarthathilae"	Anbe Vaa	04:05	1966	M. S. Viswanathan	Vaali	P. Susheela	M. G. Ramachandran	Tamil
"Nadodi Nadodi"	Anbe Vaa	06:49	1966	M. S. Viswanathan	Vaali	P. Susheela, A. L. Raghavan, L. R. Eswari	M. G. Ramachandran	Tamil
"Pudhiya Vaanam"	Anbe Vaa	04:06	1966	M. S. Viswanathan	Vaali	–	M. G. Ramachandran	Tamil
"Rajavin Paarvai"	Anbe Vaa	04:34	1966	M. S. Viswanathan	Vaali	P. Susheela	M. G. Ramachandran	Tamil
"Iraivan Irukkindrana"	Avan Pithana?	5:40	1966	R. Parathasarathi	Kannadasan	P. Susheela	S. S. Rajendran	Tamil
"Aayiram Mutham"	Avan Pithana?	3:23	1966	R. Parathasarathi	Kannadasan	P. Susheela	S. S. Rajendran	Tamil
"Kizzhakku Veluthathadi"	Avan Pithana?	3:46	1966	R. Parathasarathi	Kannadasan	P. Susheela	S. S. Rajendran	Tamil
"Indha Malligai Poovadai"	Avan Pithana?	2:00	1966	R. Parathasarathi	Kannadasan	P. Susheela	S. S. Rajendran	Tamil
"Buddhan Yésu Gandhi"	Chandhrodhayam	5.19	1966	M. S. Viswanathan	Vaali	–	M. G. Ramachandran	Tamil
"Kaasikku Pogum Sanyasi..."	Chandhrodhayam	5.23	1966	M. S. Viswanathan	Vaali	Seerkazhi Govindarajan	M. G. Ramachandran	Tamil
"Engiruntho Aasaikal..."	Chandhrodhayam	3.49	1966	M. S. Viswanathan	Vaali	P. Susheela	M. G. Ramachandran	Tamil
"Chandrodayam Oru Pennanatho..."	Chandhrodhayam	5.46	1966	M. S. Viswanathan	Vaali	P. Susheela	M. G. Ramachandran	Tamil
"Naan Malarodu"	Iru Vallavargal	3.30	1966	Vedha	Kannadasan	P. Susheela	Jaishankar	Tamil
"Aasaiya Kobama(Un Pazhakathin)"	Iru Vallavargal	3.34	1966	Vedha	Kannadasan	P. Susheela	Jaishankar	Tamil
"Anubavi Jora Anubavi"	Iru Vallavargal	3.15	1966	Vedha	Kannadasan	L. R. Eswari	Jaishankar	Tamil
"Pirantha Naal Indru Pirantha Naal"	Naam Moovar		1966	S. M. Subbaiah Naidu	Vaali		Jaishankar, Ravichandran	Tamil
"Thaaimel Aanai"	Naan Aanaiyittal	03.32	1966	M. S. Viswanathan	Vaali	–	M. G. Ramachandran	Tamil
"Pattu Varum"	Naan Aanaiyittal	04.46	1966	M. S. Viswanathan	Vaali	P. Susheela	M. G. Ramachandran	Tamil
"Nalla Velai"	Naan Aanaiyittal	04.12	1966	M. S. Viswanathan	Vaali	–	M. G. Ramachandran	Tamil
"Naan Uyara"	Naan Aanaiyittal	05.39	1966	M. S. Viswanathan	Vaali	P. Susheela	M. G. Ramachandran	Tamil
"Thaaimel Aanai (film version)"	Naan Aanaiyittal	05.29	1966	M. S. Viswanathan	Vaali	Chorus	M. G. Ramachandran	Tamil
"Enna Enthan"	Madras to Pondicherry	04.05	1966	T. K. Ramamoorthy	Namakkal Varadarajan	P. Susheela	Ravichandran	Tamil
"Engey Payanam"	Madras to Pondicherry	04.07	1966	T. K. Ramamoorthy	Alangudi Somu	P. Susheela	Ravichandran	Tamil
"Malar Ponndra Paruvame"	Madras to Pondicherry	03.26	1966	T. K. Ramamoorthy	Panchu Arunachalam		Ravichandran	Tamil
"Enakkum Unakkumtham"	Muharasi	03.44	1966	K. V. Mahadevan	Kannadasan	P. Susheela	M. G. Ramachandran	Tamil
"Enna Enna"	Muharasi	03.16	1966	K. V. Mahadevan	Kannadasan	P. Susheela	M. G. Ramachandran	Tamil
"Mugathai Kaatti"	Muharasi	03.05	1966	K. V. Mahadevan	Kannadasan	P. Susheela	M. G. Ramachandran	Tamil
"Undaakki Vittavargal"	Muharasi	04.19	1966	K. V. Mahadevan	Kannadasan		M. G. Ramachandran	Tamil
"Malar Ponndra Paruvame"	Madras to Pondicherry	03.26	1966	T. K. Ramamoorthy	Panchu Arunachalam		Ravichandran	Tamil
"Ulagamengum Orey"	Nadodi	3.24	1966	M. S. Viswanathan	Kannadasan	P. Susheela	M. G. Ramachandran	Tamil
"Kadavul seitha paavam"	Nadodi	4.43	1966	M. S. Viswanathan	Kannadasan	–	M. G. Ramachandran	Tamil
"Androru Naal"	Nadodi		1966	M. S. Viswanathan	Kannadasan	P. Susheela	M. G. Ramachandran	Tamil
"Naadu athai Naadu"	Nadodi		1966	M. S. Viswanathan	Vaali	P. Susheela	M. G. Ramachandran	Tamil
"Thirumbivaa"	Nadodi		1966	M. S. Viswanathan	Vaali	P. Susheela	M. G. Ramachandran	Tamil
"Kadavul Thandha paadam"	Nadodi		1966	M. S. Viswanathan	Kannadasan	–	M. G. Ramachandran	Tamil
"Chakkara Katti"	Petralthan Pillaiya	03.27	1966	M. S. Viswanathan	Vaali	P. Susheela	M. G. Ramachandran	Tamil
"Chellakkiliye (Men)"	Petralthan Pillaiya	03.16	1966	M. S. Viswanathan	Vaali	–	M. G. Ramachandran	Tamil
"Nalla Nalla Pillaigali"	Petralthan Pillaiya	03.28	1966	M. S. Viswanathan	Vaali	–	M. G. Ramachandran	Tamil
"Thengella Thoogadi"	Premamayi	05.40	1966	R. Sudarsanam	Narendra Babu	S. Janaki	Rajkumar	Kannada
"Maneya Jyothiyu"	Premamayi	04.01	1966	R. Sudarsanam	Vijaya Naarasimha	–	Rajkumar	Kannada
"Kannan Vandhan"	Ramu	05:27	1966	M. S. Viswanathan	Kannadasan	Seerkazhi Govindarajan	Gemini Ganesan	Tamil
"Agaramuthala"	Saraswati Sabatham	03.10	1966	K. V. Mahadevan	Kannadasan	–	Sivaji Ganesan, Gemini Ganesan	Tamil
"Deivam Iruppathu Engey"	Saraswati Sabatham	03.32	1966	K. V. Mahadevan	Kannadasan	–	Sivaji Ganesan, Gemini Ganesan	Tamil
"Kalviya Selvama Veerama"	Saraswati Sabatham	03.37	1966	K. V. Mahadevan	Kannadasan	–	Sivaji Ganesan, Gemini Ganesan	Tamil
"Rani Maharani"	Saraswati Sabatham	03.12	1966	K. V. Mahadevan	Kannadasan	–	Sivaji Ganesan, Gemini Ganesan	Tamil
"Kannathil Ennadi"	Thanipiravi	03.26	1966	K. V. Mahadevan	Kannadasan	P. Susheela	M. G. Ramachandran	Tamil
"Oray Muraithan"	Thanipiravi	03.09	1966	K. V. Mahadevan	Kannadasan	P. Susheela	M. G. Ramachandran	Tamil
"Neram Nalla Neram (Duet)"	Thanipiravi	03.13	1966	K. V. Mahadevan	Kannadasan	P. Susheela	M. G. Ramachandran	Tamil
"Neram Nalla Neram (Solo)"	Thanipiravi	03.30	1966	K. V. Mahadevan	Kannadasan	–	M. G. Ramachandran	Tamil
"Uzhaikkum Kaigale"	Thanipiravi	03.12	1966	K. V. Mahadevan	Kannadasan	–	M. G. Ramachandran	Tamil
"Paarvai Ondre Podhume"	Yaar Nee?	04:07	1966	Vedha	Kannadasan	L. R. Eswari	Jaishankar, Kumari Radha	Tamil
"Muthukulikka Vaareergala"	Anubavi Raja Anubavi	03.34	1967	M. S. Viswanathan	Kannadasan	L. R. Eswari, M. S. Viswanathan	R. Muthuraman, Nagesh	Tamil
"Madras Nalla Madras"	Anubavi Raja Anubavi	03.13	1967	M. S. Viswanathan	Kannadasan	–	R. Muthuraman, Nagesh	Tamil
"Azhagirukkuthu"	Anubavi Raja Anubavi	03.18	1967	M. S. Viswanathan	Kannadasan	Seerkazhi Govindarajan	R. Muthuraman, Nagesh	Tamil
"Enakkoru Aasi"	Ethirigal Jakkirathai	03:53	1967	Vedha	Kannadasan	P. Susheela	Ravichandran, L. Vijayalakshmi	Tamil
"Nerukku Ner Nintru"	Ethirigal Jakkirathai	03:30	1967	vedha	Kannadasan	P. Susheela	Ravichandran, L. Vijayalakshmi	Tamil
"Oru Naal Irundhen"	Ethirigal Jakkirathai	03:06	1967	Vedha	Kannadasan	P. Susheela, B. Vasantha	R. S. Manohar, Manimala& Master Sridhar	Tamil
"Jillukkadi Jillukadi"	Ethirigal Jakkirathai	03:42	1967	Vedha	Kannadasan	P. Susheela, Sirkazhi Govindarajan, L. R. Eswari	Ravichandran, L. Vijayalakshmi Thengai Srinivasan& Pushpamala	Tamil
"Maharaja Oru Maharani"	Iru Malargal		1967	M. S. Viswanathan	Vaali	Sadan, Shoba Chandrasekhar	Sivaji Ganesan	Tamil
"Mannikka Vendugiren"	Iru Malargal		1967	M. S. Viswanathan	Vaali	P. Susheela	Sivaji Ganesan	Tamil
"Madhavi Pon Mayilaal"	Iru Malargal		1967	M. S. Viswanathan	Vaali	–	Sivaji Ganesan	Tamil
"Parthu Kondathu Kannukku"	Thaikku Thalaimagan	3.55	1967	K. V. Mahadevan	Kannadasan	P. Susheela	M. G. Ramachandran	Tamil
"Vazha Vendum Manam"	Thaikku Thalaimagan	3.44	1967	K. V. Mahadevan	Kannadasan	P. Susheela	M. G. Ramachandran	Tamil
"Ninaithen vanthai"	Kaavalkaaran	5.22	1967	M. S. Viswanathan	Vaali	P. Susheela	M. G. Ramachandran	Tamil
"Mellappo mellappo"	Kaavalkaaran	4.02	1967	M. S. Viswanathan	Vaali	P. Susheela	M. G. Ramachandran	Tamil
"Adangoppuraane"	Kaavalkaaran	3.00	1967	M. S. Viswanathan	Alangudi Somu	–	M. G. Ramachandran	Tamil
"Kaathu koduthukettaen"	Kaavalkaaran		1967	M. S. Viswanathan	Vaali	–	M. G. Ramachandran	Tamil
"Pothumo Indha Idam"	Naan	03:12	1967	T. K. Ramamoorthy	Vaali	P. Susheela	Ravichandran, Jayalalithaa	Tamil
"Adhey Manam Adhey Kunamm"	Naan	03:32	1967	T. K. Ramamoorthy	Vaali	P. Susheela	Ravinchandran, Jayalalithaa, R. S. Manohar	Tamil
"Naam Annaiyittal	Naan	03:05	1967	T. K. Ramamoorthy	Kannadasan	L. R. Eswari	Ravichandran, Jaylalithaa	Tamil
"Engey Engey En Kannukku"	Paaladai	03:36	1967	K. V. Mahadevan	Kannadasan	P. Susheela		Tamil
"Nalla Nalla Nilam Parthu"	Vivasayee	3.39	1967	K. V. Mahadevan	Udumalai Narayana Kavi		M. G. Ramachandran	Tamil
"Ennama Singara"	Vivasayee	3.34	1967	K. V. Mahadevan	A. Maruthakasi	P. Susheela	M. G. Ramachandran	Tamil
"Ippadithan Irukka Vendum"	Vivasayee	3.41	1967	K. V. Mahadevan	Udumalai Narayana Kavi	P. Susheela	M. G. Ramachandran	Tamil
"Kadavul Ennum"	Vivasayee	3.45	1967	K. V. Mahadevan	A. Maruthakasi	–	M. G. Ramachandran	Tamil
"Kadhal Enthan"	Vivasayee	3.45	1967	K. V. Mahadevan	Udumalai Narayana Kavi	P. Susheela	M. G. Ramachandran	Tamil
"Vivasayee"	Vivasayee	4.22	1967	K. V. Mahadevan	A. Maruthakasi	–	M. G. Ramachandran	Tamil
"Nenjam Oru Panjumethai (Idhu Puthusu)	Sabash Thambi	05:22	1967	S. M. Subbaiah Naidu	Vaali	P. Susheela	Jaishankar, L. Vijayalakshmi	Tamil
"Sabash Thambi Un seigayai Potrukiren"	Sabash Thambi	03:19	1967	S. M. Subbaiah Naidu	Vaali	–	Jaishankar	Tamil
"Andhanarum Dheiveega Amararum"	Harichandra	01:29	1968	K. V. Mahadevan	Thanjai N. Ramaiah Dass		Sivaji Ganesan	Tamil
"Kaasiyil Vaazhum Karunai Kadale"	Harichandra	03.25	1968	K. V. Mahadevan	Thanjai N. Ramaiah Dass	–	Sivaji Ganesan	Tamil
"Ulagam Ariyaadha Pudhumai"	Harichandra	04:01	1968	K. V. Mahadevan	Thanjai N. Ramaiah Dass	–	Sivaji Ganesan	Tamil
"Yaar Poi Solluvaar"	Harichandra	03:44	1968	K. V. Mahadevan	Thanjai N. Ramaiah Dass	–	Sivaji Ganesan	Tamil
"Aaradi Kalli Nee Thaan"	Harichandra	00:37	1968	K. V. Mahadevan	Thanjai N. Ramaiah Dass	–	Sivaji Ganesan	Tamil
"Aadhiyilum Paraiyan Alla"	Harichandra	01:55	1968	K. V. Mahadevan	Thanjai N. Ramaiah Dass	–	Sivaji Ganesan	Tamil
"Aadhavaa.... Ponnudane Porul Niraindhu"	Harichandra	04.24	1968	K. V. Mahadevan	Thanjai N. Ramaiah Dass	S. V. Ponnusamy	Sivaji Ganesan	Tamil
"Needhi Dhevan Ulagil"	Harichandra	01.54	1968	K. V. Mahadevan	Thanjai N. Ramaiah Dass	Udutha Sarojini	Sivaji Ganesan	Tamil
"Vinnavar Kadhiye Potri"	Harichandra	01.13	1968	K. V. Mahadevan	Udhayakumar	-	Sivaji Ganesan	Tamil
"Un Vizhiyum En Vaalum"	Kudiyirundha Koyil	3.17	1968	M. S. Viswanathan	Vaali	L. R. Eswari	M. G. Ramachandran	Tamil
"Ennai Theriyuma"	Kudiyirundha Koyil	3.38	1968	M. S. Viswanathan	Vaali	Chorus	M. G. Ramachandran	Tamil
"Neeyethan Enakku"	Kudiyirundha Koyil	3.35	1968	M. S. Viswanathan	Vaali	P. Susheela	M. G. Ramachandran	Tamil
"Naan Yaar ? Nee Yaar ?"	Kudiyirundha Koyil	3.19	1968	M. S. Viswanathan	Pulamaipithan	–	M. G. Ramachandran	Tamil
"Thuluvadho Ilamai"	Kudiyirundha Koyil	3.37	1968	M. S. Viswanathan	Vaali	L. R. Eswari & Chorus	M. G. Ramachandran	Tamil
"Aadaludan Paadalai"	Kudiyirundha Koyil	6.07	1968	M. S. Viswanathan	Alangudi Somu	P. Susheela	M. G. Ramachandran	Tamil
"Yaaradaa Manithan Inge"	Lakshmi Kalyanam	04:35	1968	M. S. Viswanathan	–	–	Sivaji Ganesan	Tamil
"Nee Aada Aada Azhagu"	Bommalattam	03:20	1968	V. Kumar	–	–	Jaishankar	Tamil
"Nalla Naal Paarkavo"	Bommalattam	04:11	1968	V. Kumar	–	P. Susheela	Jaishankar Jayalalithaa	Tamil
"Kunguma Pottin Mangalam"	Kudiyirundha Koyil	3.42	1968	M. S. Viswanathan	Roshanara Bégum	P. Susheela	M. G. Ramachandran	Tamil
"Yaaranda Manithan"	Lakshmi Kalyanam	03.27	1968	M. S. Viswanathan	Kannadasan	–	Sivaji Ganesan	Tamil
"Poottale Unnaiyum"	Lakshmi Kalyanam	04.18	1968	M. S. Viswanathan	Kannadasan	A. L. Raghavan, L. R. Eswari	Sivaji Ganesan	Tamil
"Thanga Therodum"	Lakshmi Kalyanam	05.24	1968	M. S. Viswanathan	Kannadasan	Seerkazhi Govindarajan	Sivaji Ganesan	Tamil
"Pooti Veitha Kovilile"	Lakshmi Kalyanam	03.10	1968	M. S. Viswanathan	Kannadasan	–	Sivaji Ganesan	Tamil
"Chinnavalai Mugam"	Pudhiya Boomi	04.16	1968	M. S. Viswanathan	Kannadasan	P. Susheela	M. G. Ramachandran	Tamil
"Naan Ungal Veetu"	Pudhiya Boomi	03.53	1968	M. S. Viswanathan	Poovai Senguttavan	–	M. G. Ramachandran	Tamil
"Vizhiye Vizhiye"	Pudhiya Boomi	05.23	1968	M. S. Viswanathan	Kannadasan	P. Susheela	M. G. Ramachandran	Tamil
"Kannae Kaniyae"	Ragasiya Police 115	3.51	1968	M. S. Viswanathan	Kannadasan	P. Susheela	M. G. Ramachandran	Tamil
"Kannil Therikindra"	Ragasiya Police 115	3.16	1968	M. S. Viswanathan	Kannadasan	L. R. Eswari	M. G. Ramachandran	Tamil
"Paal tamizh paal"	Ragasiya Police 115	3.11	1968	M. S. Viswanathan	Vaali	L. R. Eswari	M. G. Ramachandran	Tamil
"Enna porutham"	Ragasiya Police 115	4.00	1968	M. S. Viswanathan	Kannadasan	P. Susheela	M. G. Ramachandran	Tamil
"Kasethan Kadavulappa"	Chakkaram	3.25	1968	S. M. Subbaiah Naidu	Vaali		A. V. M. Rajan	Tamil
"Neeye Oru Neram Sollu"	Chakkaram	4.35	1968	S. M. Subbaiah Naidu	Vaali	P. Susheela	A. V. M. Rajan	Tamil
"Kulikka Pora Kumaripponnu"	Chakkaram	4.20	1968	S. M. Subbaiah Naidu	Vaali	P. Susheela	Gemini Ganesan	Tamil
"Muthu Nagaiye"	En Thambi	3.15	1968	M. S. Viswanathan	Kannadasan	Solo	Sivaji Ganesan	Tamil
"Adiyai Nettru Pirandaval"	En Thambi	3.15	1968	M. S. Viswanathan	Kannadasan	P. Susheela	Sivaji Ganesan	Tamil
"Ayyaiya Mella Thattu"	En Thambi	3.20	1968	M. S. Viswanathan	Kannadasan	P. Susheela	Sivaji Ganesan	Tamil
"Muthu Nagaiye (Pathos Version)"	En Thambi	3.00	1968	M. S. Viswanathan	Kannadasan	Solo	Sivaji Ganesan	Tamil
"Andha Naal Gnaabagam"	Uyarndha Manithan	05:47	1968	M. S. Viswanathan	Vaali	–	Sivaji Ganesan	Tamil
"En Kelvikkenna Badhil"	Uyarndha Manithan	03:45	1968	M. S. Viswanathan	Vaali	P. Susheela	Sivaji Ganesan	Tamil
"Velli Kinnamthan"	Uyarndha Manithan	03:39	1968	M. S. Viswanathan	Vaali	–	Sivaji Ganesan	Tamil
"Raman Enbathu" (Devan Vanthan)	Kuzhanthaikkaga	04:25	1968	M. S. Viswanathan	Kannadasan	Sirkazhi Govindarajan, P. B. Srinivas	Major Sundarrajan	Tamil
"Deva Deva"	Nirai Kudam	05:50	1969	V. Kumar	Kannadasan	P. Susheela, Soolamangalam Rajalakshmi, K. Jamuna Rani	Sivaji Ganesan	Tamil
"Kannoru Pakkam"	Nirai Kudam	03:38	1969	V. Kumar	Kannadasan	P. Susheela	Sivaji Ganesan	Tamil
"Vilakke Nee Konda"	Nirai Kudam	03:57	1969	V. Kumar	Kannadasan		Sivaji Ganesan	Tamil
"Pulavar Sonnathum Poiye"	Aayiram Poi	03:45	1969	V. Kumar	Kannadasan	P. Susheela	Jaishankar	Tamil
"Thaai Illamal"	Adimaippenn	03.36	1969	K. V. Mahadevan	Alangudi Somu	–	M. G. Ramachandran	Tamil
"Unnai Paarthu"	Adimaippenn	05.14	1969	K. V. Mahadevan	Vaali	–	M. G. Ramachandran	Tamil
"Yemmattraathe"	Adimaippenn	04.37	1969	K. V. Mahadevan	Vaali	–	M. G. Ramachandran	Tamil
"Amma Endral (Not in the movie, not held)"	Adimaippenn	02.35	1969	K. V. Mahadevan	Vaali	–	M. G. Ramachandran	Tamil
"Deivame Deivame Nandri Solven"	Deiva Magan		1969	M. S. Viswanathan	Kannadasan	–	Sivaji Ganesan	Tamil
"Kadal Malar Kootam"	Deiva Magan		1969	M. S. Viswanathan	Kannadasan	–	Sivaji Ganesan	Tamil
"Anbulla Nanbare"	Deiva Magan		1969	M. S. Viswanathan	Kannadasan	–	Sivaji Ganesan	Tamil
"Kaathalikka Katrukollungal"	Deiva Magan		1969	M. S. Viswanathan	Kannadasan	P. Susheela	Sivaji Ganesan	Tamil
"Kettadhum Koduppavane Krishna"	Deiva Magan	3.56	1969	M. S. Viswanathan	Kannadasan	–	Sivaji Ganesan	Tamil
"Theru Vanthathu Pol"	Anbalippu	3.45	1969	M. S. Viswanathan	Kannadasan	–	Sivaji Ganesan	Tamil
"En Vesha Porutham"	Anbalippu	4.44	1969	M. S. Viswanathan	Kannadasan	Sirkazhi Govindarajan	Sivaji Ganesan, Jaishankar	Tamil
"Gopalan Enge Undo"	Anbalippu	3.45	1969	M. S. Viswanathan	Kannadasan	L. R. Eswari, P. Susheela, Sirkazhi Govindarajan, Tharapuram Sundararajan	Sivaji Ganesan	Tamil
"Vallimalai Maankutty"	Anbalippu	4.11	1969	M. S. Viswanathan	Kannadasan	P. Susheela	Sivaji Ganesan	Tamil
"Nalla Perai"	Nam Naadu	04.09	1969	M. S. Viswanathan	Vaali	Shoba Chandrasekhar, L. R. Anjali	M. G. Ramachandran	Tamil
"Ninathathai Nadathiyae"	Nam Naadu	04.56	1969	M. S. Viswanathan	Vaali	L. R. Eswari	M. G. Ramachandran	Tamil
"Vangaya Vathyaraiya"	Nam Naadu	04.59	1969	M. S. Viswanathan	Vaali	P. Susheela	M. G. Ramachandran	Tamil
"Pazhaniyappan Pazhaniyamma"	Thirudan	3.42	1969	M. S. Viswanathan	Kannadasan	–	Sivaji Ganesan	Tamil
"Kottai Mathilmele"	Thirudan	3.18	1969	M. S. Viswanathan	Kannadasan	L. R. Eswari	Sivaji Ganesan	Tamil
"Nenjam Undu (Solo)"	En Annan	3.27	1970	K. V. Mahadevan	Kannadasan	–	Sivaji Ganesan, Rajinikanth	Tamil
"Neela Niram"	En Annan	4.24	1970	K. V. Mahadevan	Kannadasan	S. Janaki	M. G. Ramachandran	Tamil
"Kondai Oru Pakkam"	En Annan	4.09	1970	K. V. Mahadevan	Kannadasan	P. Susheela	M. G. Ramachandran	Tamil
"Kadavul Yen Kallanar"	En Annan	3.19	1970	K. V. Mahadevan	Kannadasan	–	M. G. Ramachandran	Tamil
"Aayiram Ennam Kondu"	En Annan	5.51	1970	K. V. Mahadevan	Kannadasan	P. Susheela	M. G. Ramachandran	Tamil
"Aasai Iruku"	En Annan	3.36	1970	K. V. Mahadevan	Kannadasan, Venkatachalam	L. R. Eswari	M. G. Ramachandran	Tamil
"Nenjam Undu"	En Annan	3.27	1970	K. V. Mahadevan	Kannadasan	P. Susheela	M. G. Ramachandran	Tamil
"Naan Thannanthani"	Enga Mama	04:16	1970	M. S. Viswanathan	Kannadasan	–	Sivaji Ganesan	Tamil
"Ellorum Nalam Vaazha"	Enga Mama	04:38	1970	M. S. Viswanathan	Kannadasan	–	Sivaji Ganesan	Tamil
"Chellakkiligalam Palliley"	Enga Mama	04:00	1970	M. S. Viswanathan	Kannadasan	–	Sivaji Ganesan	Tamil
"Chellakkiligalam Palliley" (Sad Version)	Enga Mama	01:00	1970	M. S. Viswanathan	Kannadasan	–	Sivaji Ganesan	Tamil
"Ennanga Sollunga"	Enga Mama	04:08	1970	M. S. Viswanathan	Vaali	P. Susheela	Sivaji Ganesan	Tamil
"Sorgam Pakkathil"	Enga Mama	04:25	1970	M. S. Viswanathan	Kannadasan	L. R. Eswari	Sivaji Ganesan	Tamil
"Dont Touch Mr X"	Engal Thangam	04:26	1970	M. S. Viswanathan	Vaali	L. R. Eswari	M. G. Ramachandran	Tamil
"Thangapadkathin"	Engal Thangam	04:31	1970	M. S. Viswanathan	Vaali	P. Susheela	M. G. Ramachandran	Tamil
"Kadha Kaalatchebam"	Engal Thangam	10:57	1970	M. S. Viswanathan	Vaali		M. G. Ramachandran	Tamil
"Naan Alavodu Rasipavan"	Engal Thangam	04:56	1970	M. S. Viswanathan	Vaali	P. Susheela	M. G. Ramachandran	Tamil
"Mogam Piranthadamma"	Engal Thangam	05:16	1970	M. S. Viswanathan	Vaali		M. G. Ramachandran	Tamil
"Naan Sethu Pulachavanda"	Engal Thangam	03:49	1970	M. S. Viswanathan	Vaali		M. G. Ramachandran	Tamil
"Ore Padal Unnai Azhaikhum"	Engirundho Vandhaal		1970	M. S. Viswanathan		–	Sivaji Ganesan	Tamil
"Sirippil Undaagum"	Engirundho Vandhaal		1970	M. S. Viswanathan		P. Susheela	Sivaji Ganesan	Tamil
"Sathiyam Neeye"	Maattukara Velan	04.15	1970	K. V. Mahadevan		–	M. G. Ramachandran	Tamil
"Oru Pakkam Parkkiral"	Maattukara Velan	03.40	1970	K. V. Mahadevan		L. R. Eswari	M. G. Ramachandran	Tamil
"Poo Vaitha"	Maattukara Velan	04.13	1970	K. V. Mahadevan		P. Susheela, L. R. Eswari	M. G. Ramachandran	Tamil
"Thottu Kollava"	Maattukara Velan	03.05	1970	K. V. Mahadevan		P. Susheela	M. G. Ramachandran	Tamil
"Pattikada Pattanamma"	Maattukara Velan	05.24	1970	K. V. Mahadevan		L. R. Eswari	M. G. Ramachandran	Tamil
"Ammadi Ponnukku"	Raman Ethanai Ramanadi	03.40	1970	M. S. Viswanathan	Kannadasan	–	Sivaji Ganesan	Tamil
"Ammadi Ponnukku (Sad)"	Raman Ethanai Ramanadi	02.49	1970	M. S. Viswanathan	Kannadasan	–	Sivaji Ganesan	Tamil
"Ponmagal Vandaal"	Sorgam	03.22	1970	M. S. Viswanathan	Alangudi Somu	–	Sivaji Ganesan	Tamil
"Sollathe Yarum Ketal"	Sorgam	03.10	1970	M. S. Viswanathan	Kannadasan	–	Sivaji Ganesan	Tamil
"Sorgathai Theduvom"	Thedi Vandha Mappillai	3.56	1970	M. S. Viswanathan	Kannadasan	–	M. G. Ramachandran	Tamil
"Idamo Sugamanathu (Naalu Pakkam Suvaru)"	Thedi Vandha Mappillai	3.44	1970	M. S. Viswanathan	Vaali	P. Susheela	M. G. Ramachandran	Tamil
"Thotu Katava"	Thedi Vandha Mappillai	3.42	1970	M. S. Viswanathan	Vaali	–	M. G. Ramachandran	Tamil
"Ada Arumugam"	Thedi Vandha Mappillai	3.42	1970	M. S. Viswanathan	Vaali	P. Susheela	M. G. Ramachandran	Tamil
"Maanikkka Theril Maragatha"	Thedi Vandha Mappillai	3.22	1970	M. S. Viswanathan	Kannadasan	P. Susheela	M. G. Ramachandran	Tamil
"Paalakkaattu Pakkathile"	Vietnam Veedu	03.53	1970	K. V. Mahadevan	Kannadasan	P. Susheela	Sivaji Ganesan	Tamil
"Un Kannil Near"	Vietnam Veedu	03.59	1970	K. V. Mahadevan	Kannadasan	–	Sivaji Ganesan	Tamil
"Ulagathile Oruvan"	Vietnam Veedu	06.29	1970	K. V. Mahadevan	Kannadasan	Rajalakshmi	Sivaji Ganesan	Tamil
"Visiladichan Kunjugala"	Maanavan	03.40	1970	Shankar–Ganesh	Vaali		Jaishankar	Tamil
"Varadappa Varadappa"	Babu	04.19	1971	M. S. Viswanathan	Vaali		Sivaji Ganesan	Tamil
"Aadhi Mudhale"	Babu	06.46	1971	M. S. Viswanathan	Vaali	Sirkazhi Govindarajan, L. R. Eswari, S. C. Krishnan	Sivaji Ganesan	Tamil
"Idho Endhan Deivam" - 1	Babu	04.14	1971	M. S. Viswanathan	Vaali		Sivaji Ganesan	Tamil
"Idho Endhan Deivam" - 2	Babu	01.26	1971	M. S. Viswanathan	Vaali	S. Janaki	Sivaji Ganesan	Tamil
"Ennamma Rani"	Kumari Kottam	03:55	1971	M. S. Viswanathan	Alangudi Somu	–	M. G. Ramachandran	Tamil
"Vanthaan Aaiyah"	Kumari Kottam	04:06	1971	M. S. Viswanathan	Kannadasan	–	M. G. Ramachandran	Tamil
"Engey Aval"	Kumari Kottam	03:23	1971	M. S. Viswanathan	Pulamaipithan	–	M. G. Ramachandran	Tamil
"Naam Oruvarai"	Kumari Kottam	04:13	1971	M. S. Viswanathan	Vaali	L. R. Eswari	M. G. Ramachandran	Tamil
"Aayiram Kannukku (Male)"	Oru Thaai Makkal	3.23	1971	M. S. Viswanathan	Kannadasan	–	M. G. Ramachandran	Tamil
"Paadinal oru Paattu"	Oru Thaai Makkal	4.04	1971	M. S. Viswanathan	Vaali	P. B. Sreenivas	M. G. Ramachandran	Tamil
"Kannan Enthan Kaadhalan"	Oru Thaai Makkal	3.19	1971	M. S. Viswanathan	Vaali	P. Susheela	M. G. Ramachandran	Tamil
"Ingu Nallairukanum"	Oru Thaai Makkal	4.15	1971	M. S. Viswanathan	Vaali	P. Susheela	M. G. Ramachandran	Tamil
"Nethu Paricha Roja"	Praptham		1971	M. S. Viswanathan		–	Sivaji Ganesan	Tamil
"Sondham Eppodhum"	Praptham		1971	M. S. Viswanathan	Kannadasan	P. Susheela	Sivaji Ganesan	Tamil
"Thalaattu Paadi"	Praptham		1971	M. S. Viswanathan		–	Sivaji Ganesan	Tamil
"Kadloram Vaangiya"	Rickshawkaran	04.37	1971	M. S. Viswanathan	Vaali	–	M. G. Ramachandran	Tamil
"Ange Sirippavarkal"	Rickshawkaran	05.27	1971	M. S. Viswanathan	Vaali	–	M. G. Ramachandran	Tamil
"Kollimalai Kaatukkule"	Rickshawkaran	05.17	1971	M. S. Viswanathan	Vaali	P. Susheela	M. G. Ramachandran	Tamil
"Kadalooram Vaangiya"	Rickshawkaran	5:03	1971	M. S. Viswanathan	Vaali	–	M. G. Ramachandran	Tamil
"Aanaikoru Kalam"	Savaale Samali	04.34	1971	M. S. Viswanathan	Kannadasan	–	Sivaji Ganesan	Tamil
"Nilavai Paarthu Vaanam"	Savaale Samali	03.16	1971	M. S. Viswanathan	Kannadasan	–	Sivaji Ganesan	Tamil
"Oru Tharam Ore Tharam"	Sumathi En Sundari		1971	M. S. Viswanathan		–	Sivaji Ganesan	Tamil
"Unnaithedivarum"	Thangaikkaaga	04.24	1971	M. S. Viswanathan	Kannadasan	S. Janaki	Sivaji Ganesan	Tamil
"Yedhaiyum Thanguven"	Thangaikkaaga	04.25	1971	M. S. Viswanathan	Kannadasan	–	Sivaji Ganesan	Tamil
"Devamaindhan Pogindran"	Annai Velankanni	03.23	1971	G. Devarajan		–		Tamil
"Neelakkadalin Oratthil"	Annai Velankanni	03.22	1971	G. Devarajan		–		Tamil
"Pera Orani"	Annai Velankanni	06.39	1971	G. Devarajan		–		Tamil
"Chinna Kutty Ponnu"	Then Kinnam	06.27	1971	Shankar–Ganesh	Kumara Devan	K. Jamuna Rani	Nagesh	Tamil
"Akkam Pakkam"	Then Kinnam	03.47	1971	Shankar–Ganesh	Kumara Devan	K. Jamuna Rani	Nagesh	Tamil
"Kadhalo Kadhaal"	Then Kinnam	04.06	1971	Shankar–Ganesh	Kumara Devan	L. R. Anjali	Nagesh	Tamil
"Utharavindri Ulley Vaa"	Then Kinnam	05.59	1971	Shankar–Ganesh	Kumara Devan	L. R. Eswari	Nagesh	Tamil
"Kalyanam Oru Vizha"	Tiger Thathachari		1971	Soolamangalam Sisters		Soolamangalam Rajalakshmi		Tamil
"Utharavindri Ulle Vaa"	Uttharavindri Ulle Vaa	04.38	1971	M. S. Viswanathan	Kannadasan	L. R. Eswari, S. P. Balasubrahmanyam	Ravichandran	Tamil
"Vendriduven"	Agathiyar		1972	Kunnakudi Vaidyanathan	Ulundurpettai Shanmugam	Seerkazhi Govindarajan	Seerkazhi Govindarajan, R. S. Manohar	Tamil
"Onnonna Onnonna"	Annamitta Kai	03.22	1972	K. V. Mahadevan	Vaali	P. Susheela	M. G. Ramachandran	Tamil
"Annamitta Kai"	Annamitta Kai	03.56	1972	K. V. Mahadevan	Vaali	–	M. G. Ramachandran	Tamil
"Azhagukku"	Annamitta Kai	04.59	1972	K. V. Mahadevan	Vaali	Jikki	M. G. Ramachandran	Tamil
"Mayangi Vitten"	Annamitta Kai	04.11	1972	K. V. Mahadevan	Vaali	P. Susheela	M. G. Ramachandran	Tamil
"Naan Ondru Ninaithen"	Appa Tata		1972	M. S. Viswanathan		–	Gemini Ganesan	Tamil
"Paarthaal Murugan Mugam"	Avasara Kalyanam		1972	T. R. Pappa	Kannadasan	–	Jaishankar	Tamil
"Thiruchendoorin Kadalorathil Senthilnaatham Arasangam"	Deivam		1972	Kunnakudi Vaidyanathan	Kannadasan	Seerkazhi Govindarajan	T. M. Soundararajan, Seerkazhi Govindarajan	Tamil
"Amma Kannu"	Gnana Oli	03:19	1972	M. S. Viswanathan	Kannadasan	P. Susheela	Sivaji Ganesan	Tamil
"Devane Ennai"	Gnana Oli	05:01	1972	M. S. Viswanathan	Kannadasan	–	Sivaji Ganesan	Tamil
"Aanandham Indru"	Idhaya Veenai	03:28	1972	Shankar–Ganesh	Vaali	S. Janaki	M. G. Ramachandran	Tamil
"Kashmir Beautiful"	Idhaya Veenai	07:28	1972	Shankar–Ganesh	Vaali	–	M. G. Ramachandran	Tamil
"Oru Vaalum"	Idhaya Veenai	03:38	1972	Shankar–Ganesh	Vaali	–	M. G. Ramachandran	Tamil
"Pon Andhi"	Idhaya Veenai	05:49	1972	Shankar–Ganesh	Pulamaipithan	P. Susheela	M. G. Ramachandran	Tamil
"Thirunirai Selvi"	Idhaya Veenai	04:14	1972	Shankar–Ganesh	Vaali	–	M. G. Ramachandran	Tamil
"Petredutha Ullam"	Kanna Nalama		1972	M. S. Viswanathan		–	Gemini Ganesan	Tamil
"Chittirai Solaigale"	Naan Yen Pirandhen	03.19	1972	Shankar–Ganesh	Bharathidasan	–	M. G. Ramachandran	Tamil
"Naan Paadum Paadal"	Naan Yen Pirandhen	03.29	1972	Shankar–Ganesh	Vaali	–	M. G. Ramachandran	Tamil
"Naan Yaen Piranthen"	Naan Yen Pirandhen	04.09	1972	Shankar–Ganesh	Vaali	–	M. G. Ramachandran	Tamil
"Thambikku (Happy)"	Naan Yen Pirandhen	03.38	1972	Shankar–Ganesh	Avinasi Mani	–	M. G. Ramachandran	Tamil
"Unathu Vizhiyel"	Naan Yen Pirandhen	03.54	1972	Shankar–Ganesh	Pulamaipithan	P. Susheela	M. G. Ramachandran	Tamil
"Yennamma"	Naan Yen Pirandhen	04.27	1972	Shankar–Ganesh	Vaali	Kausalya	M. G. Ramachandran	Tamil
"Engaladhu Bhoomi"	Needhi		1972	M. S. Viswanathan	Kannadasan	J. P. Chandrababu, P. Susheela & Manorama	Sivaji Ganesan	Tamil
"Naalai Mudhal Kudikka"	Needhi		1972	M. S. Viswanathan	Kannadasan	–	Sivaji Ganesan	Tamil
"Mappilaiya Paathukkadi Maina"	Needhi		1972	M. S. Viswanathan	Kannadasan	–	Sivaji Ganesan	Tamil
"Ennadi Rakkamma"	Pattikada Pattanama	02:50	1972	M. S. Viswanathan	Kannadasan	–	Sivaji Ganesan	Tamil
"Ennadi Rakkamma (Sad)"	Pattikada Pattanama	03:37	1972	M. S. Viswanathan	Kannadasan	–	Sivaji Ganesan	Tamil
"Kettukodi Uruvi"	Pattikada Pattanama	04:27	1972	M. S. Viswanathan	Kannadasan	L. R. Eswari	Sivaji Ganesan	Tamil
"Nalvazhthu Naan Soluvaen"	Pattikada Pattanama	03:29	1972	M. S. Viswanathan	Kannadasan	–	Sivaji Ganesan	Tamil
"Adiyamma Rajathi"	Vasantha Maligai	03:15	1972	K. V. Mahadevan	Kannadasan	P. Susheela	Sivaji Ganesan	Tamil
"Irandu Manam"	Vasantha Maligai	04:10	1972	K. V. Mahadevan	Kannadasan	–	Sivaji Ganesan	Tamil
"Kudimagane"	Vasantha Maligai	03:17	1972	K. V. Mahadevan	Kannadasan	L. R. Eswari	Sivaji Ganesan	Tamil
"Mayakkam Enna"	Vasantha Maligai	03:30	1972	K. V. Mahadevan	Kannadasan	P. Susheela	Sivaji Ganesan	Tamil
"O Manida"	Vasantha Maligai	02:02	1972	K. V. Mahadevan	Kannadasan	–	Sivaji Ganesan	Tamil
"Oru Kinnathai"	Vasantha Maligai	03:16	1972	K. V. Mahadevan	Kannadasan	Vasantha	Sivaji Ganesan	Tamil
"Yaarukkaga"	Vasantha Maligai	03:28	1972	K. V. Mahadevan	Kannadasan	–	Sivaji Ganesan	Tamil
"Kalayana Ponnu"	Raja	04:23	1972	M. S. Viswanathan	Kannadasan	–	Sivaji Ganesan	Tamil
"Nee Vara Vendum"	Raja	04:26	1972	M. S. Viswanathan	Kannadasan	P. Susheela	Sivaji Ganesan	Tamil
"Anjathe Nee"	Kurathi Magan	06:15	1972	K. V. Mahadevan		–	Gemini Ganesan	Tamil
"Kurathi Vadi"	Kurathi Magan	03:15	1972	K. V. Mahadevan		–	Gemini Ganesan	Tamil
"Puthiketta Ponnu"	Anbai Thedi		1973	M. S. Viswanathan			Sivaji Ganesan	Tamil
"Raamanin Nayagi"	Engal Thai		1973	M. S. Viswanathan		P. Susheela	Jaishankar	Tamil
"Mezhuguvarthi Erikindrathu"	Gauravam	03.33	1973	M. S. Viswanathan	Kannadasan	–	Sivaji Ganesan	Tamil
"Neeyum Naanuma"	Gauravam	04.33	1973	M. S. Viswanathan	Kannadasan	–	Sivaji Ganesan	Tamil
"Palooti Valarthakili Palam"	Gauravam	04.32	1973	M. S. Viswanathan	Kannadasan	–	Sivaji Ganesan	Tamil
"Aagaya Panthalile"	Ponnunjal		1973	M. S. Viswanathan		P. Susheela	Sivaji Ganesan	Tamil
"Bansaayee (Ten thousand years)"	Ulagam Sutrum Valiban	04.44	1973	M. S. Viswanathan	Vaali	L. R. Eswari	M. G. Ramachandran	Tamil
"Lilly Malarukku"	Ulagam Sutrum Valiban	05.20	1973	M. S. Viswanathan	Kannadasan	P. Susheela	M. G. Ramachandran	Tamil
"Nilavu Oru"	Ulagam Sutrum Valiban	04.22	1973	M. S. Viswanathan	Vaali	–	M. G. Ramachandran	Tamil
"Oh My Darling (In the album)"	Ulagam Sutrum Valiban	04.03	1973	M. S. Viswanathan	Vaali	P. Susheela	M. G. Ramachandran	Tamil
"Pachchaikili"	Ulagam Sutrum Valiban	04.37	1973	M. S. Viswanathan	Vaali	P. Susheela	M. G. Ramachandran	Tamil
"Sirithu Vaazhavendum"	Ulagam Sutrum Valiban	04.29	1973	M. S. Viswanathan	Pulamaipithan	Chorus	M. G. Ramachandran	Tamil
"Ulagam Ulagam"	Ulagam Sutrum Valiban	03.39	1973	M. S. Viswanathan	Kannadasan	S. Janaki	M. G. Ramachandran	Tamil
"Ilamai Nattiya Salai "	Kalyanamam Kalyanam		1974	Vijaya Baskar			Jaishankar	Tamil
"Naan Padichen (Thambi)"	Netru Indru Naalai	06.04	1974	M. S. Viswanathan	Vaali	–	M. G. Ramachandran	Tamil
"Nee Ennenna"	Netru Indru Naalai	04.02	1974	M. S. Viswanathan	Pulamaipithan	P. Susheela	M. G. Ramachandran	Tamil
"Innoru Vaanam (Roméo)"	Netru Indru Naalai	03.46	1974	M. S. Viswanathan	Kannadasan	P. Susheela	M. G. Ramachandran	Tamil
"Nerungi Nerungi"	Netru Indru Naalai	03.18	1974	K. V. Mahadevan	Suratha	P. Susheela	M. G. Ramachandran	Tamil
"Sugam Sugam"	Paadha Poojai		1974					Tamil
"Aadikku Pinne"	Sivagamiyin Selvan	04:30	1974	M. S. Viswanathan	kannadasan	L. R. Eswari	Sivaji Ganesan	Tamil
"Iniyavale"	Sivagamiyin Selvan	04:43	1974	M. S. Viswanathan	Pulamaipithan	P. Susheela	Sivaji Ganesan	Tamil
"Mela Thaalam"	Sivagamiyin Selvan	03:30	1974	M. S. Viswanathan	Kannadasan	P. Susheela	Sivaji Ganesan	Tamil
"Ullam Rendum"	Sivagamiyin Selvan	04:43	1974	M. S. Viswanathan	Vaali	–	Sivaji Ganesan	Tamil
"Sothanai Mel Sothanai"	Thanga Pathakkam	03.54	1974	M. S. Viswanathan	Kannadasan	–	Sivaji Ganesan	Tamil
"Nalladhoru Kudumbam"	Thanga Pathakkam	04.04	1974	M. S. Viswanathan	Kannadasan	Sai Baba	Sivaji Ganesan	Tamil
"Sumathaki Sayinthal"	Thanga Pathakkam	03.37	1974	M. S. Viswanathan	Kannadasan	–	Sivaji Ganesan	Tamil
"Aadi Vaa Azhagurani"	Anbu Thangai		1974	K. V. Mahadevan		–		Tamil
"Neengal Athanai Perum"	En Magan	03.41	1974	M. S. Viswanathan	Kannadasan		Sivaji Ganesan	Tamil
"Ponnukkenna Azhagu"	En Magan	04.32	1974	M. S. Viswanathan	Kannadasan	P. Susheela	Sivaji Ganesan	Tamil
"Neengal Athanai Perum" (Sad)	En Magan	03.10	1974	M. S. Viswanathan	Kannadasan		Sivaji Ganesan	Tamil
"Sone Pappidi"	En Magan	04.30	1974	M. S. Viswanathan	Kannadasan	Kovai Sounderarajan	Sivaji Ganesan	Tamil
"Oonjalukku"	Avanthan Manithan	05.38	1975	M. S. Viswanathan	Kannadasan	–	Sivaji Ganesan	Tamil
"Anbu Nadamadum"	Avanthan Manithan	04.41	1975	M. S. Viswanathan	Kannadasan	P. Susheela	Sivaji Ganesan	Tamil
"Aattuviththaal Yaaroruvar"	Avanthan Manithan	04.09	1975	M. S. Viswanathan	Kannadasan	–	Sivaji Ganesan	Tamil
"Manidhan Ninaippadhundu"	Avanthan Manithan	04.52	1975	M. S. Viswanathan	Kannadasan	–	Sivaji Ganesan	Tamil
"Jalitha Vanitha (Oonjalukku)"	Avanthan Manithan	05.44	1975	M. S. Viswanathan	Kannadasan	–	Sivaji Ganesan	Tamil
"Ah Engirundho Oru Kural"	Avanthan Manithan	04.24	1975	M. S. Viswanathan	Kannadasan	P. Susheela	Sivaji Ganesan	Tamil
"Kathal Sarithirathai"	Dr. Siva		1975	M. S. Viswanathan	Vaali	P. Susheela	Sivaji Ganesan	Tamil
"Sivappu Kal"	Ellorum Nallavare		1975	V. Kumar		P. Susheela	R. Muthuraman	Tamil
"Kadhal Rajiyam"	Mannavan Vanthaanadi		1975	M. S. Viswanathan		P. Susheela	Sivaji Ganesan	Tamil
"Naanoru Medai Paadagan"	Naalai Namadhe	06.06	1975	M. S. Viswanathan	Vaali	S. P. Balasubrahmanyam, L. R. Eswari	M. G. Ramachandran	Tamil
"Naalai Namathe (Anbu Malargalai)"	Naalai Namadhe	04.58	1975	M. S. Viswanathan	Vaali	S. P. Balasubrahmanyam	M. G. Ramachandran	Tamil
"Poomazhai Thoovi Vasantham (Short version)"	Ninaithadhai Mudippavan	2.19	1975	M. S. Viswanathan	A. Maruthakasi	–	M. G. Ramachandran	Tamil
"Kannai Nambathey"	Ninaithadhai Mudippavan	4.33	1975	M. S. Viswanathan	Pulamaipithan	–	M. G. Ramachandran	Tamil
"Poomazhai Thoovi Vasantham (Long version)"	Ninaithadhai Mudippavan	4.29	1975	M. S. Viswanathan	A. Maruthakasi	–	M. G. Ramachandran	Tamil
"Oruvar Meethu"	Ninaithadhai Mudippavan	5.17	1975	M. S. Viswanathan	Vaali	P. Susheela	M. G. Ramachandran	Tamil
"Thaane Thaane Thanthanathana"	Ninaithadhai Mudippavan	3.28	1975	M. S. Viswanathan	Kannadasan	–	M. G. Ramachandran	Tamil
"Poomazhai Thoovi Vasantham (Short version)"	Ninaithadhai Mudippavan	0.41	1975	M. S. Viswanathan	A. Maruthakasi	–	M. G. Ramachandran	Tamil
"Yaarukku Ethile"	Paruvam Oru Paadam		1975					Tamil
"Ilaivittu Malar"	Sondhangal Vaazhga		1975	K. V. Mahadevan		P. Susheela	Jaishankar	Tamil
"Senthamizh Paadum"	Vaira Nenjam		1975	M. S. Viswanathan		P. Susheela	Sivaji Ganesan	Tamil
"Naan Ariyatha""	Cinema Paithiyam		1975	Shankar–Ganesh	Kannadasan		Tamil	
"Yezhuthatha Paadal"	Then Sindhudhe Vaanam	04:08	1975	V. Kumar	Vaali	Swarna	Sivakumar, Kamal Haasan	Tamil
"Kanavugale Kanavugale"	Uthaman	03.04	1976	K. V. Mahadevan	Kannadasan	–	Sivaji Ganesan	Tamil
"Devan Vanthandi"	Uthaman	04.21	1976	K. V. Mahadevan	Kannadasan	P. Susheela	Sivaji Ganesan	Tamil
"Hari Om Ranga Hari"	Uthaman	04.47	1976	K. V. Mahadevan	Kannadasan	P. Susheela	Sivaji Ganesan	Tamil
"Kealai Magane"	Uthaman	04.24	1976	K. V. Mahadevan	Kannadasan	–	Sivaji Ganesan	Tamil
"Naalai Naalai (Happy)"	Uthaman	04.18	1976	K. V. Mahadevan	Kannadasan	P. Susheela	Sivaji Ganesan	Tamil
"Naalai Naalai (Pathos)"	Uthaman	04.18	1976	K. V. Mahadevan	Kannadasan	P. Susheela	Sivaji Ganesan	Tamil
"Thanneerai Neruppu"	Sorgam Naragam		1977	Shankar–Ganesh		–	Sivakumar	Tamil
"Veeramagan"	Madhuraiyai Meetta Sundharapandiyan	3.41	1978	M. S. Viswanathan	Muthulingam	–	M. G. Ramachandran	Tamil
"Thayagathin Sudhanthiramae"	Madhuraiyai Meetta Sundharapandiyan	3.53	1978	M. S. Viswanathan	Muthulingam	–	M. G. Ramachandran	Tamil
"Enga Rangan Thanga Rangan"	Thanga Rangan		1978	M. S. Viswanathan		Soolamangalam Rajalakshmi		Tamil
"Nallavarkkellam"	Thyagam	4.21	1978	Ilaiyaraaja	Kannadasan	–	Sivaji Ganesan	Tamil
"Thenmalli Poove"	Thyagam	4.03	1978	Ilaiyaraaja	Kannadasan	S. Janaki	Sivaji Ganesan	Tamil
"Uzhagam Verum"	Thyagam	4.24	1978	Ilaiyaraaja	Kannadasan	–	Sivaji Ganesan	Tamil
"Amma Nee Summandha Pillai"	Annai Oru Aalayam		1979	Ilaiyaraaja			Rajinikanth	Tamil
"Endanponnvannamae"	Naan Vazhavaippen		1979	Ilaiyaraaja	Kannadasan	–	Sivaji Ganesan, Rajinikanth	Tamil
"Malar Kodutthen"	Thirisoolam	04.10	1979	M. S. Viswanathan	Kannadasan	–	Sivaji Ganesan	Tamil
"Sindhunadhi Karaiyoram"	Nallathoru Kudumbam		1979	Ilaiyaraaja	Kannadasan	P. Susheela	Sivaji Ganesan	Tamil
"Kanna Un Leela Vinodam"	Nallathoru Kudumbam		1979	Ilaiyaraaja	Kannadasan	P. Susheela	Sivaji Ganesan	Tamil
"One and Two.. Chachchachaa.."	Nallathoru Kudumbam		1979	Ilaiyaraaja	Kannadasan	L. R. Eswari	Sivaji Ganesan	Tamil
"Pattadhellaam Podhumaa.."	Nallathoru Kudumbam		1979	Ilaiyaraaja	Kannadasan	–	Sivaji Ganesan	Tamil
"Neramithu"	Rishi Moolam	04.34	1980	Ilaiyaraaja	Kannadasan	P. Susheela	Sivaji Ganesan	Tamil
"Aimbathilum Aasai Varum"	Rishi Moolam	04.37	1980	Ilaiyaraaja	Kannadasan	–	Sivaji Ganesan	Tamil
"Noolumillai"	Rail Payanangalil	05.27	1981	Vijaya T. Rajendar	Vijaya T. Rajendar	–	Sreenath	Tamil
"Amaithikku Peyarthaan Shanthi"	Rail Payanangalil	05.17	1981	Vijaya T. Rajendar	Vijaya T. Rajendar	–	Sreenath	Tamil
"Selvame Pesi, Manithan Oru"	Amara Kaviyam		1981	M.S. Viswanathan		–		Tamil
"Gurudana Kavi"	Nenjil Oru Raagam		1982	M.S. Viswanathan		–		Tamil
"Idhayam Adhai Kovil Enben"	Uyirullavarai Usha	04.12	1983	Vijaya T. Rajendar	Vijaya T. Rajendar	–		Tamil
" Ithu Aanantham Vilayaadum Veedu, Sollappur Raja Sollappur Rani, Mangalyam Thavazhum, Unnai Than Kumbitten, Vaarthtai Naanadi Kannamma"	Sandhippu	03.44	1983	M.S. Viswanathan	Vaali	P. Susheela, Vani Jairam	Sivaji Ganesan	Tamil
" Sonthamillai, Anbenum"	Chiranjeevi		1984	M.S. Viswanathan			Shivaji Ganesan	Tamil
"Baby Baby O My Baby"	Bandham	04.20	1985	Shankar–Ganesh	Pulamaipithan, Vaali	S. Janaki	Sivaji Ganesan	Tamil
"Naan Mudhan Mudhal, Oh Kangale, Oru Mullai Poo, Thaai Maman, Thaalam Thatti"	ThaaiNaadu	24.71	1989	Manoj–Gyan	lyrics by Aabavanan	T. M. Soundararajan	Sathyaraj	Tamil
"Aanavam kolathathey"	Gnana Paravai	5:03	1991	M. S. Viswanathan		–	Sivaji Ganesan	Tamil
"Eduthavan"	Dharmangal Sirikkinrana		1972	Shankar–Ganesh		–	Ravichandran	Tamil
"Semmozhiyana Thamiz mozhiyam"	Semmozhiyaana Thamizh Mozhiyaam	5.50	2010	A. R. Rahman	M. Karunanidhi	–		Tamil
