= Uththaman =

- Theatrical release poster
- Directed by: V. B. Rajendr Prasanth
- Written by: Balamurugan (dialogues)
- Story by: Jeevanprabha M. Desai
- Produced by: V. B. Rajendra Prasanth
- Starring: Sivaji Ganesan; Manjula
- Cinematography: S. Venkatarathnam
- Edited by: A. Sanjeevi
- Music by: K. V. Mahadevan
- Production company: Jagapathy Art Pictures
- Release date: 25 June 1976
- Country: India
- Language: Tamil

Uthaman (transl. The perfect man) is a 1976 Indian Tamil-language film, directed and produced by V. B. Rajendra Prasanth. The film stars Sivaji Ganesan and Manjula. It is a remake of the 1973 Hindi film Aa Gale Lag Jaa. The film was released on 25 June 1976.

== Plot ==
Gopi is a skating instructor and a tourist guide. He meets Radha, falls in love, makes love and marries her while on vacation. Later, he learns that Radha's father is a millionaire and he disdains Gopi. Radha's father and their relatives manipulate the situation in such a manner that it appears to him that Radha regrets marrying Gopi and has buyer's remorse.

He leaves back to the hill station taking his son only to learn that his son has polio and cannot even walk. Radha meanwhile assumes that Gopi betrayed her and her son is dead. Whether or not they reunite forms the rest of the dramatic story.

== Cast ==
- Sivaji Ganesan as Gopi/Gopalakrishnan
- Manjula as Radha
- Master Titto as Raja
- Major Sundarrajan as Chief Doctor
- V. K. Ramasamy as Selvanayagam
- K. Balaji as Dr. Ramesh
- Pandari Bai as Gopi's mother
- Nagesh as Ramu
- Veeraraghavan as Dr. Moorthy
- Pushpamala as Nurse
- Typist Gopu as lyer
- Prabhu as Dancer
- S. A. Chandrasekhar as Dancer

== Production ==
Some filming took place in Kashmir. The skating scenes were shot at AVM Studios.

== Soundtrack ==
The music was composed by K. V. Mahadevan, with lyrics by Kannadasan.

Song	Singers	Length
"Kanavugale Kanavugale"	T. M. Soundararajan	03:04
"Devan Vanthandi"	T. M. Soundararajan, P. Susheela	04:21
"Hari Om Ranga Hari"	T. M. Soundararajan, P. Susheela	04:47
"Kealai Magane"	T. M. Soundararajan	04:24
"Naalai Naalai" (Happy)	T. M. Soundararajan, P. Susheela	04:18
"Naalai Naalai" (Pathos)	T. M. Soundararajan, P. Susheela	04:18
"Padagu Padagu"	S. P. Balasubrahmanyam, P. Susheela	06:39

== Reception ==
Naagai Dharuman of Navamani praised the acting, dialogues, humour, dialogues, cinematography, art and direction.
