= Oru Thai Makkal =

- Theatrical release poster
- Directed by: P. Neelakantan
- Story by: Sachin Bhowmick
- Produced by: T. A. Durai Raj
- Dialogue by: Swornam
- Starring: M. G. Ramachandran; Jayalalithaa; R. Muthuraman; M. N. Nambiar
- Cinematography: V. Ramamoorthy
- Edited by: R. Devarajan
- Music by: M. S. Viswanathan
- Production company: Nanjil Productions
- Release date: 9 December 1971
- Country: India
- Language: Tamil

Oru Thai Makkal (transl. Sons of a Mother) is a 1971 Indian Tamil-language romantic comedy drama film, directed by P. Neelakantan, starring M. G. Ramachandran, with M. N. Nambiar, Jayalalithaa and R. Muthuraman. It is a remake of the 1964 Hindi film Ayee Milan Ki Bela. The film was released on 9 December 1971.

== Plot ==
Kannan is a manager in charge of a collective farm who falls in love with Radha, daughter of the leader of the farm, Selvanayagam. When Ravi, cousin of Radha comes to the farm after finishing his education in London, he becomes a good friend of Kannan. Ravi is Kannan's brother adopted by Radha's aunt and uncle, Namasivayam and has hopes on Radha. Rathnam, a drunkard officer of the farm steals and sells the farm's paddy. He is caught red handed to Kannan, who sacks him but doesn't disclose the reason to anyone.

When Ravi, Radha and Kannan go to inspect a new land for a farm, at night, Ravi sees Kannan and Radha are talking in love. When Ravi realizes that they are in love, he becomes vengeful. Rathnam gets the chance to avenge Kannan for sacking him. With the help of two women he had relationships with and are now pregnant, he frames Kannan for theft, fraud and rape. The women help him reluctantly in the hope that he will marry them and save them from dishonour. Kannan escapes from the village swearing that he will prove his innocence. Radha is forced to marry Ravi.

Kannan comes to Rathnam with a gun to threaten him into confessing, but he is outnumbered by Rathnam and his henchmen and locked in a cage. Rathnam says to his men that he had no intention to marry a woman who helped him to frame Kannan and she hears it. Then she struggles, but is put to the cage where she meets Kannan. They succeed in an escape plan and Kannan takes her to the wedding feast. There she confesses and the other woman who helped Rathnam to frame Kannan also confesses. In this clash, Ravi drags Radha and boards a jeep. Kannan chases them by motorbike. On a rocky beach, they fight hand to hand and also with guns, then the people gathered at wedding come to the beach. Radha's aunt reveals that Ravi is Kannan's brother. Radha and Kannan reunite. Ravi gives up his vengeance.

== Cast ==
Actor	Role
M. G. Ramachandran	as Kannan
Jayalalithaa	as Radha
R. Muthuraman	as Ravi
M. N. Nambiar	as Rathnam
S. A. Ashokan	as Selvanayagam, Radha's father
V. K. Ramasamy	as Kailasam
Cho Ramaswamy	as Sivamani
Pandari Bai	as Bakiyum
Udaya Chandrika	as Meena
S. D. Subbulakshmi	
Rajakokila	as Rosie, Rathnam's lover

== Soundtrack ==
The soundtrack was composed by M. S. Viswanathan.

Track listing
No.	Title	Lyrics	Singer(s)	Length
1.	"Aayiram Kannukku" (Male)	Kannadasan	T. M. Soundararajan	3:23
2.	"Aayiram Kannukku" (Female)	Kannadasan	P. Susheela	4:07
3.	"Paadinal oru Paattu"	Vaali	T. M. Soundararajan, P. B. Sreenivas	4:04
4.	"Kannan Enthan Kaadhalan"	Vaali	T. M. Soundararajan, P. Susheela	3:19
5.	"Ingu Nallairukanum"	Vaali	T. M. Soundararajan, P. Susheela	4:15
Total length:				19:08

== Release ==
Oru Thai Makkal was released on 9 December 1971. The film underperformed commercially with a 70-day run in theatres.
