= Muthuraman =

Muthuraman is a surname. Notable people with the surname include:

- B. Muthuraman (born 1944), business manager
- Karthik Muthuraman (born 1960), Indian actor, singer, and politician
- R. Muthuraman (1929–1982), Tamil actor
- S. P. Muthuraman (born 1935), Indian director
