= List of songs recorded by L. R. Eswari =

Lourde-Mary Rajeswari (L. R. Eswari) is a veteran playback singer of the Tamil cinema, Telugu cinema, Malayalam cinema and Kannada cinema industries. She also sang in other languages like Hindi, Tulu, and English. She has won Kalaimamani, the Tamil Nadu's state award, for her contributions to the film industry.

== Recorded film songs ==
This is only a partial list; L. R. Eswari has sung over 7000 songs in Tamil, Kannada, Telugu, Malayalam and Hindi.

== Tamil film songs ==
=== 1950s ===
Year	Film	Song	Composer(s)	Writer(s)	Co-artist(s)
1954	Manohara	"Inbanaalidhe Idhayam Kaanudhe"			Jikki
1958	Kudumba Gouravam	"Saerum Kaalam Vandhaachu	Viswanathan–Ramamoorthy	A. Maruthakasi	P. B. Sreenivas & K. Jamuna Rani
1958	Maalaiyitta Mangai	""Saattai Illaa Pambarampol"	Viswanathan–Ramamoorthy	Kannadasan	Thiruchi Loganathan & dialogues by Pandari Bai
1958	Manamulla Maruthaaram	Aasai Kanavugale Sadhaavum	K. V. Mahadevan		Jikki & G. Kasthoori
1958	Manamulla Maruthaaram	Kaalile Thandai Kalakalakka	K. V. Mahadevan		G. Kasthoori
1958	Manamulla Maruthaaram	Vaanga Ammaa Vaanga Valaiyal	K. V. Mahadevan		S. C. Krishnan
1958	Nalla Idathu Sammandham	"Puthu Pennae"	K. V. Mahadevan	A. S. Nayayanan	T. R. Gajalakshmi, G. Kasthoori & Udutha Sarojini
1958	Nalla Idathu Sammandham	"Ponnu Mappillai"	K. V. Mahadevan	A. S. Nayayanan	G. Kasthoori
1958	Nalla Idathu Sammandham	"Thukkaththil Sirikkanum"	K. V. Mahadevan	A. Maruthakasi	
1958	Nalla Idathu Sammandham	"Ivarey Thaan Avaru"	K. V. Mahadevan	A. Maruthakasi	
1958	Neelavukku Neranja Manasu	"Cycle Varudhu Cycle Varudhu"	K. V. Mahadevan	A. Maruthakasi	Thiruchi Loganathan
1958	Peria Koil	Aathaadi Thallaadha Thaathaavai	K. V. Mahadevan		K. Jamuna Rani
1958	Pillai Kaniyamudhu	Aambala Manasu Pala Thinusu	K. V. Mahadevan	A. Maruthakasi	K. Jamuna Rani, G. Kasthoori & Udutha Sarojini
1958	Pillai Kaniyamudhu	Sanga Thamizh Mozhi	K. V. Mahadevan	A. Maruthakasi	K. Jamuna Rani, G. Kasthoori & Udutha Sarojini
1958	Thai Pirandhal Vazhi Pirakkum	Thai Pirandhal Vazhi Pirakkum	K. V. Mahadevan	A. Maruthakasi	T. M. Soundararajan, P. Leela & S. V. Ponnusamy
1958	Thedi Vandha Selvam	Pakkatthila Irruppey	T. G. Lingappa	Pattukkottai Kalyanasundaram	T. M. Soundararajan
1958	Thirudargal Jakkirathai	"Nallavar Pola Veli Vesham"	K. V. Mahadevan	A. Maruthakasi	G. Kasthoori
1959	Alli Petra Pillai	Kaathiruken Velyoram	K. V. Mahadevan	A. Maruthakasi	Thiruchi Loganathan
1959	Amudhavalli	Kangal Rendum Vandu	Viswanathan–Ramamoorthy	Pattukkottai Kalyanasundaram	P. Susheela
1959	Amudhavalli	Kollimalai Vaazhum	Viswanathan–Ramamoorthy	Muthukoothan	
1959	Bhaaga Pirivinai	Otrumaiyaai Vaazhvadhaale Undu Nanmaiye"	Viswanathan–Ramamoorthy	A. Maruthakasi	Seerkazhi Govindarajan
1959	Engal Kuladevi	Onnum Theriyaadha Kanni	K. V. Mahadevan	A. Maruthakasi	Thiruchi Loganathan
1959	Kaveriyin Kanavan	Maappillai Vandhaan	K. V. Mahadevan	Thanjai N. Ramaiah Dass	M. S. Rajeswari
1959	Naalu Veli Nilam	"Ooraar Urangaiyile"	K. V. Mahadevan	Traditional	Thiruchi Loganathan
1959	Naatukoru Nallaval	Kaalam Varappogudhu Thannale	Master Venu	M. K. Athmanathan	Seergazhi Govindarajan
1959	Raja Malaya Simman	Aasai Maamaa	Viswanathan–Ramamoorthy	A. Maruthakasi	S. C. Krishnan
1959	Sumangali	Uzhavan Viyarvaiyada .. Pattikadu Endraley	M. Ranga Rao	En Thangai Natarajan	Seerkazhi Govindarajan & Shanmugasundaram
1959	Thaai Magalukku Kattiya Thaali	Thanjavooru Bommaiyai Paarunggadi	T. R. Pappa	Udumalai Narayana Kavi	Seerkazhi Govindarajan, T. M. Soundararajan & P. Susheela
1959	Thayapola Pillai Noolapola Selai	Paatti Sollum Kadhai	K. V. Mahadevan	A. Maruthakasi	Thiruchi Loganathan, Seerkazhi Govindarajan & Soolamangalam Rajalakshmi
1959	Uzhavukkum Thozhilukkum Vandhanai Seivom	Kanniyare Kanniyare	K. V. Mahadevan	Kannadasan	
1959	Uzhavukkum Thozhilukkum Vandhanai Seivom	Chinna Idai Odindhidave	K. V. Mahadevan	A. Maruthakasi	K. Jamuna Rani
1959	Uzhavukkum Thozhilukkum Vandhanai Seivom	Uzhavukkum Thozhilukkum	K. V. Mahadevan	A. Maruthakasi	S. C. Krishnan
1959	Vaazha Vaitha Deivam	Kolli Malai Saaralile	K. V. Mahadevan		S. C. Krishnan
1959	Vaazha Vaitha Deivam	Vaazha Vaitha Deivam	K. V. Mahadevan		T. M. Soundararajan

=== 1960s ===
Year	Film	Song	Composer(s)	Writer(s)	Co-artist(s)
1960	Aalukkoru Veedu	Urukellaam Ore Saami	Viswanathan–Ramamoorthy	Pattukkottai Kalyanasundaram	K. Jamuna Rani
1960	Aalukkoru Veedu	Kaiyile Valai Kulunga	Viswanathan–Ramamoorthy	K. D. Santhanam	Renuka
1960	Deivapiravi	"Kattadatthukku Manai Poruttham"	R. Sudarsanam	K. S. Gopalakrishnan	S. C. Krishnan
1960	Ellorum Innaattu Mannar	Ellaarum Innaattu Mannaradaa"	T. G. Lingappa	S. Rathinam	T. M. Soundararajan, A. L. Raghavan
1960	Ellorum Innaattu Mannar	"Vishayam Onnu Sollaporen"	T. G. Lingappa	Pattukottai Kalyanasundaram	K. Jamuna Rani
1960	Kuzhandhaigal Kanda Kudiyarasu	"Kuzhandhaigal Kanda Kudiyarasu"	T. G. Lingappa	Ku. Ma. Balasubramaniam	M. S. Padma
1960	Kuzhandhaigal Kanda Kudiyarasu	"Mudindhathu Indru Mudiyarasu"	T. G. Lingappa	Ku. Ma. Balasubramaniam	M. S. Padma
1960	Engal Selvi	"Enna Peru Vaikkalaam"	K. V. Mahadevan	Kannadasan	K. Jamuna Rani & P. Leela
1960	Kairasi	"Poologam Maarinaalum	R. Govardhanam	K. S. Gopalakrishnan	S. C. Krishnan
1960	Mahalakshmi	"Chinnanchiru Kannan"	K. V. Mahadevan	A. Maruthakasi	M. S. Rajeswari
1960	Mannathi Mannan	"Aadum Mayile Azhagu Mayile"	Viswanathan–Ramamoorthy	A. Maruthakasi	K. Jamuna Rani
1960	Mannathi Mannan	"Avala Ivala Therndhu Edu"	Viswanathan–Ramamoorthy	Kannadasan	L. R. Anjali
1960	Ondrupattal Undu Vazhvu	"Ulagathile .. Kalangadhe Kavalaipadadhe"	Viswanathan–Ramamoorthy	Pattukkottai Kalyanasundaram.	Seergazhi Govindarajan, S. C. Krishnan & K. Jamuna Rani
1960	Ondrupattal Undu Vazhvu	"Annaachi Vandhaachi Arivu Thelivaachu"	Viswanathan–Ramamoorthy	Pattukkottai Kalyanasundaram.	Thiruchi Loganathan
1960	Padikkadha Medhai	"Inba Malargal Poothu"	K. V. Mahadevan	A. Maruthakasi	P. Susheela
1960	Paavai Vilakku	"Vannathamizh Pennoruthi"	K. V. Mahadevan	A. Maruthakasi	C. S. Jayaraman
1960	Ponni Thirunaal	Karumbu Villai Edutthu	K. V. Mahadevan	Thanjai N. Ramaiah Dass	Thiruchi Loganathan, Seerkazhi Govindarajan, A. L. Raghavan & S. V. Ponnusamy
1960	Ponni Thirunaal	Ponggi Varum Kaaviriye	K. V. Mahadevan	A. Maruthakasi	Thiruchi Loganathan, Seerkazhi Govindarajan & Soolamangalam Rajalakshmi
1960	Thangam Manasu Thangam	Chinnan Chiru Veedu Onnu	K. V. Mahadevan	A. Maruthakasi	M. S. Rajeswari & K. Jamuna Rani
1960	Thanthaikku Pin Thamaiyan	Pozhaikka Theriya Venum	K. V. Mahadevan	A. S. Narayanan	S. C. Krishnan
1960	Thanthaikku Pin Thamaiyan	Aananda Vaazhvin	K. V. Mahadevan	Kovai Kumaradevan	K. Jamuna Rani
1960	Thilakam	"Aayi Mahamaayi Perai Cholli"	R. Sudharsanam	Kothamangalam Subbu	S. C. Krishnan, Soolamangalam Rajalakshmi
1960	Thilakam	"Inneram Ennai Seidhe"	R. Sudharsanam	Kothamangalam Subbu	S. C. Krishnan
1960	Thilakam	"Thanjavoor Karagamadi Oh Mariammaa"	R. Sudharsanam	Kothamangalam Subbu	S. C. Krishnan, Soolamangalam Rajalakshmi & T. M. Soundararajan
1960	Veerakkanal	"Thazhi Pottu Kitta"	K. V. Mahadevan	Pattukkottai Kalyanasundaram	S. C. Krishnan
1960	Veerakkanal	"Pottukitta Rendu"	K. V. Mahadevan	Pattukkottai Kalyanasundaram	Tiruchi Loganathan
1960	Veera Pandiyan	"Madhurai Koyil Pole Maamani Kovai Pole"	Rajan–Nagendra		S. C. Krishnan
1960	Vijayapuri Veeran	"Kokkarichu Koodu Paayum"	T. R. Pappa		S. C. Krishnan & T. V. Rathnam
1960	Yanai Paagan	Aambalaikku Pombala Avasiyandhaan	K. V. Mahadevan	Alangudi Somu	A. L. Raghavan
1960	Yanai Paagan	Pandhiyile Mattum Munne	K. V. Mahadevan	A. Maruthakasi	A. L. Raghavan
1961	Bhagyalakshmi	"Paartheeraa Aiyaa Paartheera"	Viswanathan–Ramamoorthy	Kannadasan	S. C. Krishnan
1961	Ellam Unakkaga	"Eru Katchikku"	K. V. Mahadevan	Thanjai N. Ramaiah Dass	A. L. Raghavan
1961	Ellam Unakkaga	"Manasu Pola Mapillai"	K. V. Mahadevan	Kothamangalam Subbu	P. Susheela & Soolamangalam Rajalakshmi
1961	Ellam Unakkaga	"Kannale Kadhal Kaditham"	K. V. Mahadevan	Kannadasan	A. L. Raghavan
1961	Ellam Unakkaga	"Thanga Magane Inbam Thandha"	K. V. Mahadevan	Kannadasan	P. Susheela
1961	Kongunattu Thangam	"Unnai Nenaichi Naanirundhen "	K. V. Mahadevan	Puratchidasan	A. L. Raghavan
1961	Manapanthal	"Muthu Muthu Pacharisi"	Viswanathan–Ramamoorthy	Kannadasan	S. Janaki
1961	Manapanthal	"Ammavukku Manasukkuley"	Viswanathan–Ramamoorthy	Kannadasan	S. C. Krishnan
1961	Paava Mannippu	"Saaya Veeti"	Viswanathan–Ramamoorthy	Kannadasan	T. M. Soundararajan & K. Jamuna Rani
1961	Panam Panthiyile	"Panam Irukkumpodhu Oru Pechchu"	K. V. Mahadevan	Ka. Mu. Sheriff	S. V. Ponnusamy
1961	Panithirai	"April Fool Endroru Jaadhi"	K. V. Mahadevan	Kothamangalam Subbu	P. Susheela, A. L. Raghavan & S. V. Ponnusamy
1961	Pasamalar	"Vaarayen Thozhi"	Viswanathan–Ramamoorthy	Kannadasan	
1961	Thayilla Pillai	"Kaalam Maruthu Karuthu Maruthu"	K. V. Mahadevan	Kannadasan	A. L. Raghavan
1962	Aalayamani	"Kallellam Manikka"	Viswanathan–Ramamoorthy	Kannadasan	T. M. Soundararajan
1962	Annai	"Ore Oru Oorile"	R. Sudharsanam	Kannadasan	T. M. Soundararajan & A. L. Raghavan
1962	Avana Ivan	"Kalyaana Ponnu Kalangaathey Kannu"	S. Balachander	Vidhvan Ve. Lakshmanan	Renuka
1962	Naagamalai Azhagi	"Konji Konji Pesalaam"	S. P. Kothandapani & T. A. Mothi	Elangkavi Muthukoothan	P. B. Sreenivas
1962	Naagamalai Azhagi	Maamaannu Solli Kooppdidavaa	S. P. Kothandapani & T. A. Mothi	Elangkavi Muthukoothan	S. Janaki
1962	Nichaya Thaamboolam	"Alangaram Alangaram"	Viswanathan–Ramamoorthy	Kannadasan	S. C. Krishnan
1962	Nichaya Thaamboolam	"Ithu Ver Ulagam"	Viswanathan–Ramamoorthy	Kannadasan	T. M. Soundararajan
1962	Paadha Kaanikkai	""Kadhal Enbathu"	Viswanathan–Ramamoorthy	Kannadasan	P. B. Sreenivas, P. Susheela & J. P. Chandrababu
1962	Paadha Kaanikkai	"Sonnathellam"	Viswanathan–Ramamoorthy	Kannadasan	P. Susheela
1962	Paadha Kaanikkai	"Unathu Malar"	Viswanathan–Ramamoorthy	Kannadasan	P. Susheela
1962	Pirandhanaal	"Jaan Pillai Aanaalum Aan Pillai"	K. V. Mahadevan	A. Maruthakasi	S. C. Krishnan
1962	Policekaran Magal	"Porandhalum Aambalaiya Porakka Koodadhu"	Viswanathan–Ramamoorthy	Kannadasan	J. P. Chandrababu
1962	Sarada	"Thattu Thadumaari Nenjam"	K. V. Mahadevan	Kannadasan	Seerkazhi Govindarajan
1962	Sarada	"Manamakale Marumakale"	K. V. Mahadevan	Kannadasan	Soolamangalam Jayalakshmi & Soolamangalam Rajalakshmi
1962	Sengamala Theevu	"Kannaal Pesuvom, Kaiyai Veesuvom"	K. V. Mahadevan	Thiruchi Thiyagarajan	Soolamangalam Rajalakshmi
1962	Sengamala Theevu	"Paaduvom Poomalai Sooduvom"	K. V. Mahadevan	Thiruchi Thiyagarajan	Soolamangalam Rajalakshmi
1962	Sengamala Theevu	"Malarai Parithaai Thalaiyil Vaithaai"	K. V. Mahadevan	Thiruchi Thiyagarajan	P. B. Sreenivas
1962	Senthamarai	"Vaaranam Aayiram Soozha Valam Seidhu"	Viswanathan–Ramamoorthy	Thiruppavai	P. Leela & L. R. Anjali
1962	Senthamarai	"Ponnai Thedi Varuvaar"	Viswanathan–Ramamoorthy	Kannadasan	Jikki & L. R. Anjali
1962	Senthamarai	"Ponnedutthu Seidhu Vaiththa"	Viswanathan–Ramamoorthy	Kannadasan	P. Leela & L. R. Anjali
1962	Thendral Veesum	Yaen Mama Kovamaa	Viswanathan–Ramamoorthy	Mayavanathan	G. K. Venkatesh
1962	Thendral Veesum	"Aasaiyil Pirapathu Thunivu"	Viswanathan–Ramamoorthy	Mayavanathan	
1962	Thendral Veesum	"Aambala Manasu Aasaiyinaale"	Viswanathan–Ramamoorthy	Mayavanathan	S. C. Krishnan
1962	Vadivukku Valai Kappu	"Un Manam Irangida Venum"	K. V. Mahadevan	A. Maruthakasi	Chrous
1962	Vadivukku Valai Kappu	Saalaiyile Puliyamaram Jameenthaaru	K. V. Mahadevan	A. S. Narayanan	P. Susheela
1962	Veerathirumagan	"Kettadhu Kidaikkum"	Viswanathan–Ramamoorthy	Kannadasan	
1962	Veerathirumagan	"Neelapattadai Katti"	Viswanathan–Ramamoorthy	Kannadasan	P. Susheela
1963	Aasai Alaigal	Alli Alli Kodutthaalum.... Anbu Enbadhu	K. V. Mahadevan	Kannadasan	Seerkazhi Govindarajan & K. Jamuna Rani
1963	Aasai Alaigal	Alli Alli Kodutthaalum.... Anbu Enbadhu-2	K. V. Mahadevan	Kannadasan	Seerkazhi Govindarajan & K. Jamuna Rani
1963	Aasai Alaigal	Andha Mayakkam Vendum	K. V. Mahadevan	Kannadasan	K. Jamuna Rani
1963	Idhayathil Nee	"Chithira Poovizhi"	Mayavanathan	Kannadasan	P. Susheela
1963	Idhu Sathiyam	Singara Therukku	Viswanathan–Ramamoorthy	Kannadasan	Seerkazhi Govindarajan
1963	Iruvar Ullam	Buddhi Sigamani	K. V. Mahadevan	Kannadasan	A. L. Raghavan
1963	Kaanchi Thalaivan	"Avani Ellam"	K. V. Mahadevan	Alangudi Somu	S. V. Ponnusamy
1963	Kaanchi Thalaivan	"Neermel Nadakkalam"	K. V. Mahadevan	M. Karunanidhi	A. L. Raghavan
1963	Kadavulai Kanden	Konjam Sindhikkanum	K. V. Mahadevan	Kannadasan	J. P. Chandrababu
1963	Kadavulai Kanden	Kadavul Enge, Kadavul Enge	K. V. Mahadevan	Kannadasan	K. Jamuna Rani
1963	Kaithiyin Kathali	Singaara Malligai Maruvu	K. V. Mahadevan	A. Maruthakasi	
1963	Lava Kusa	Thappu Thappunu Thuniyai Thuvaichu	K. V. Mahadevan & Ghantasala	A. Maruthakasi	Thiruchi Loganathan
1963	Mani Osai	"Paayuthu Paayuthu"	Viswanathan–Ramamoorthy	Kannadasan	P. Susheela
1963	Mani Osai	"Aattukkutti Aattukutti"	Viswanathan–Ramamoorthy	Kannadasan	
1963	Naan Vanangum Dheivam	"Naagareegamaai Vaazhanum"	K. V. Mahadevan		K. Jamuna Rani
1963	Naan Vanangum Dheivam	"Veenaana Jaalangal Nee Seivathenadi"	K. V. Mahadevan		K. Jamuna Rani & A. G. Rathnamala
1963	Neengadha Ninaivu	Oh .. Oh .. Chinnagnchiru Malarai Maranduvidaathe	K. V. Mahadevan	Vaali	P. Susheela
1963	Neengadha Ninaivu	Paarthathundaa Kettathundaa	K. V. Mahadevan	A. Maruthakasi	
1963	Paar Magaley Paar	"Enthan Kannai"	Viswanathan–Ramamoorthy	Kannadasan	A. L. Raghavan
1963	Panathottam	"Oruvar Oruvarai"	Viswanathan–Ramamoorthy	Kannadasan	T. M. Soundararajan
1963	Periya Idathu Penn	"Kattodu Kuzhalaada"	Viswanathan–Ramamoorthy	Kannadasan	T. M. Soundararajan & P. Susheela
1963	Ratha Thilagam	"Thazhampoove"	K. V. Mahadevan	Kannadasan	T. M. Soundararajan
1963	Ratha Thilagam	"Vaadai Kaatramma"	K. V. Mahadevan	Kannadasan	
1963	Ratha Thilagam	""Happy Birthday"	K. V. Mahadevan	Kannadasan	
1963	Vanambadi	"Yettil Ezhuthi Vaithan"	K. V. Mahadevan	Kannadasan	T. M. Soundararajan
1963	Vanambadi	"Nil Kavani Purappadu"	K. V. Mahadevan	Kannadasan	A. L. Raghavan
1964	Aandavan Kattalai	""Kannirandum Minnaminna"	Viswanathan Ramamoorthy	Kannadasan	P. B. Sreenivas
1964	Arunagirinathar	"Amma Deivam Agivittal"	G. Ramanathan & T. R. Pappa	T. K. Krishnasamy	
1964	Bommai	"Thathi Thathi Nadandhuvarum Thangapapa"	S. Balachander	Vidhvan Ve. Lakshmanan	
1964	Kai Koduttha Dheivam	"Sindhu Nadhiyin Misai"	Viswanathan Ramamoorthy	Mahakavi Bharathiyar	T. M. Soundararajan & J. V. Raghavulu
1964	Kai Koduttha Dheivam	"Kulunga Kulunga Sirikkum"	Viswanathan Ramamoorthy	Kannadasan	P. Susheela
1964	Kalai Kovil	""Mullil Roja"	Viswanathan Ramamoorthy	Kannadasan	P. B. Sreenivas
1964	Kalai Kovil	"Varavendum"	Viswanathan Ramamoorthy	Kannadasan	
1964	Karuppu Panam	"Ammamma Keladi"	Viswanathan–Ramamoorthy	Kannadasan	
1964	Karuppu Panam	"Kayilae Panamirundhal"	Viswanathan–Ramamoorthy	Kannadasan	
1964	Karuppu Panam	"Aadavarellam Aadavaralam"	Viswanathan–Ramamoorthy	Kannadasan	
1964	Karuppu Panam	"Pattu Chiragukonda"	Viswanathan–Ramamoorthy	Kannadasan	A. L. Raghavan
1964	Karuppu Panam	"Thangachi Chinna Ponnu"	Viswanathan–Ramamoorthy	Kannadasan	Seerkazhi Govindarajan
1964	Magaley Un Samathu	"Satthiyatthai Kaakka Vandha Thanga Padhumai"	G. K. Venkatesh		K. Jamuna Rani
1964	Magaley Un Samathu	"Thaatha Thaatha"	G. K. Venkatesh		Manorama
1964	Magaley Un Samathu	"Annamidum Karangalinaal "	G. K. Venkatesh		Soolamangalam Rajalakshmi
1964	Navarathri	"Vandha Naal Mudhal"	K. V. Mahadevan	Kannadasan	K. Jamuna Rani, Soolamangalam Rajalakshmi & L. R. Anjali
1964	Pachai Vilakku	"Kanni Venduma"	Viswanathan Ramamoorthy	Kannadasan	P. B. Sreenivas
1964	Pachai Vilakku	"Thoothu Solla"	Viswanathan Ramamoorthy	Kannadasan	P. Susheela
1964	Panakkara Kudumbam	"Ondru Engal Jaathiye"	Viswanathan Ramamoorthy	Kannadasan	T. M. Soundararajan
1964	Panakkara Kudumbam	"Vaadiamma Vaadi"	Viswanathan Ramamoorthy	Kannadasan	P. Susheela & L. R. Anjali
1964	Server Sundaram	"Avalukkenna"	Viswanathan Ramamoorthy	Vaali	T. M. Soundararajan
1964	Server Sundaram	"Paattondru Tharuvaar"	Viswanathan Ramamoorthy	Kannadasan	P. Susheela
1964	Server Sundaram	"Om Namo Sri Narayana"	Viswanathan Ramamoorthy	V. Seetharaman	A. L. Raghavan & S. C. Krishnan
1964	Thozhilali	"Aazham Theriyaamal"	K. V. Mahadevan	Alangudi Somu	Seerkazhi Govindarajan
1964	Vazhkai Vazhvatharke	"Pache Kuthaliyo.... Azhagana Malayalam"	Vazhkai Vazhvatharke	Kannadasan	
1964	Veera Pandiyan	"Pazhani Aandavaa Murugaa Pazhani Aandavaa"	Rajan–Nagendra		Thiruchi Loganathan
1964	Vettaikaaran	"Seettu Kattu Raja"	K. V. Mahadevan	Kannadasan	A. L. Raghavan
1965	Anandhi	Kuluradikuthu"	M. S. Viswanathan	Kannadasan	T. M. Soundararajan
1965	Enga Veettu Pillai	Kankalum Kaavadi"	Viswanathan–Ramamoorthy	Alangudi Somu	
1965	Enga Veettu Pillai	"Malarukku Thendral"	Viswanathan–Ramamoorthy	Alangudi Somu	P. Susheela
1965	Enga Veettu Pillai	"Naan Maanthoppil"	Viswanathan–Ramamoorthy	Vaali	T. M. Soundararajan
1965	Ennathan Mudivu	Kalaithanil	R. Sudharsanam		Seerkazhi Govindarajan
1965	Kaakum Karangal	Azhagiya Rathiyae"	K. V. Mahadevan	Vaali	A. L. Raghavan
1965	Kalyana Mandapam	Unnaithaan Thedivandhen	R. Parthasarathy	Thellur Dharmarajan	
1965	Karthigai Deepam	Kaiyum Kaiyum Modhinal"	R. Sudarsanam	Alangudi Somu	
1965	Karthigai Deepam	"Paarkatha Ulagam"	R. Sudarsanam	Alangudi Somu	T. M. Soundararajan
1965	Karthigai Deepam	"Thanga Theril"	R. Sudarsanam	Alangudi Somu	
1965	Karthigai Deepam	"Ungu Unnuda Selvame"	R. Sudarsanam	Alangudi Somu	
1965	Kuzhandaiyum Deivamum	Ahah Idhu Nalliravu	M. S. Viswanathan	Kannadasan	
1965	Nee!	Adada Enna Azhagu"	M. S. Viswanathan	Vaali	
1965	Nee!	"One Day One Way"	M. S. Viswanathan	Vaali	P. B. Sreenivas
1965	Nee!	"Sonnaalum Sonnaandi"	M. S. Viswanathan	Vaali	
1965	Nee!	"Vanthaalenna" (Enakkuvantha)	M. S. Viswanathan	Vaali	
1965	Neela Vaanam	O Lakshmi, O Sheela, O Maalaa	M. S. Viswanathan	Kannadasan	
1965	Neela Vaanam	Mangala Mangaiyum Maappillaiyum	M. S. Viswanathan	Kannadasan	P. Susheela
1965	Panam Padaithavan	"Maanicka Thottil"	Viswanathan–Ramamoorthy	Vaali	T. M. Soundararajan & P. Susheela
1965	Panam Padaithavan	"Paruvathil Konjam"	Viswanathan–Ramamoorthy	Vaali	T. M. Soundararajan
1965	Panam Padaithavan	"Pavalakodiyil"	Viswanathan–Ramamoorthy	Vaali	T. M. Soundararajan
1965	Pazhani	Annachi Vaetti"	Viswanathan–Ramamoorthy	Kannadasan	A. L. Raghavan, Seerkazhi Govindarajan, T. M. Soundararajan & S. C. Krishnan
1965	Poojaikku Vandha Malar	"Ven Palingu Medai"	Viswanathan–Ramamoorthy		Seerkazhi Govindarajan
1965	Poomalai	Badhamgeer….Rani Diamond	R. Sudharsanam	V. Seetharaman	S. C. Krishnan
1965	Poomalai	Kannam Kannam	R. Sudharsanam	M. Karunanidhi	
1965	Thaayum Magalum	Vettattaa Thattattaa	P. S. Diwakar	Kannadasan	Adham Shaw
1965	Thaayum Magalum	Kaiyile Oru Tie, Kaalile Oru Tie	P. S. Diwakar	Kannadasan	K. J. Yesudas
1965	Thaayum Magalum	Kaattrulla Podhe Thoothikka Venum	P. S. Diwakar	Kannadasan	T. M. Soundararajan, K. J. Yesudas & P. Susheela
1965	Thaayum Magalum	Vaammaa Vaamma Mayakkam Ennammaa	P. S. Diwakar	Kannadasan	T. M. Soundararajan
1965	Thaayum Magalum	Thaayum Magalum Kovilile	P. S. Diwakar	Kannadasan	K. J. Yesudas & T. M. Soundararajan
1965	Thazhampoo	Vatta Vatta Paaththi"	K. V. Mahadevan	Alangudi Somu	
1965	Vaazhkai Padagu	Pazhani Santhana Vaadai"	Viswanathan–Ramamoorthy	Kannadasan	Seerkazhi Govindarajan
1965	Vallavanukku Vallavan	Paa Manakuthu Poo"	Vedha	Kannadasan	Seerkazhi Govindarajan
1965	Vallavanukku Vallavan	Kandalum Kanndene"	Panju Arunachalam		Seerkazhi Govindarajan
1965	Vennira Aadai	Alli Panthal"	Viswanathan–Ramamoorthy	Kannadasan	Raju
1965	Vennira Aadai	Nee Enbathenna"	Viswanathan–Ramamoorthy	Kannadasan	
1966	Anbe Vaa	"Nadodi Nadodi"	M. S. Viswanathan		T. M. Soundararajan, P. Susheela & A. L. Raghavan
1966	Chitthi	"Sathipoma Indru"	M. S. Viswanathan	Kannadasan	P. B. Sreenivas
1966	Chitthi	"Santhipoma Indru" (Sad)	M. S. Viswanathan	Kannadasan	P. B. Sreenivas
1966	Enga Pappa		M. S. Viswanathan		
1966	Iru Vallavargal	"Angey Yen Indha"	Vedha	Kannadasan	
1966	Iru Vallavargal	"Kadhal Undagum"	Vedha	Kannadasan	Seerkazhi Govindarajan
1966	Iru Vallavargal	"Anubavi Jora Anubavi"	Vedha	Kannadasan	T. M. Soundararajan
1966	Kodimalar	"Kannadi Meniyadi"	M. S. Viswanathan	Kannadasan	P. Susheela
1966	Kodimalar	"Kalathu Metta"	M. S. Viswanathan		A. L. Raghavan
1966	Kumari Penn	"Yaaro Aada Therinthavar"	M. S. Viswanathan	Kannadasan	
1966	Kumari Penn	"Neeye Sollu"	M. S. Viswanathan	Kannadasan	P. B. Sreenivas
1966	Kumari Penn	"Varushathai Paaru"	M. S. Viswanathan	Kannadasan	
1966	Motor Sundaram Pillai	"Gubu Gubu Naan Engine"	K. V. Mahadevan	Kothamangalam Subbu	A. L. Raghavan
1966	Motor Sundaram Pillai	"Thulli Thulli Vilaiyada"	K. V. Mahadevan	Kothamangalam Subbu	P. Susheela, Soolamangalam Rajalakshmi
1966	Naam Moovar	"Singapore Machaan"	S. M. Subbaiah Naidu	Vaali	T. M. Soundararajan
1966	Naan Aanaiyittal	"Pirandha Idam"	M. S. Viswanathan	Alangudi Somu	
1966	Namma Veettu Lakshmi	"Alankaram Kalaiyamal"	M. S. Viswanathan	Kannadasan	K. J. Yesudas
1966	Parakkum Paavai	"Mutthamo Mogamo"	M. S. Viswanathan	Kannadasan	T. M. Soundararajan
1966	Parakkum Paavai	"Sugam Yethilae"	M. S. Viswanathan	Kannadasan	T. M. Soundararajan & K. J. Yesudas
1966	Sadhu Mirandal	"Pattali Thozhilalarkalai"	T. K. Ramamoorthy	Alangudi Somu	S. C. Krishnan
1966	Sadhu Mirandal	"A for Apple... B for Biscuit... C for Chocolate..."	T. K. Ramamoorthy	Thanjai Vanan	A. L. Raghavan, Lalitha
1966	Selvam	"Lilli Lalli Jimmi"	K. V. Mahadevan	Vaali	
1966	Vallavan Oruvan	"Ammamma Kannathil"	Vedha	Kannadasan	
1966	Vallavan Oruvan	"Palingunal Oru Maligai"	Vedha	Kannadasan	
1966	Yaar Nee?	Tikkiriki Tikkiriki Tattada"	Vedha	Kannadasan	P. B. Sreenivas
1966	Yaar Nee?	"Parvai Ondre Pothume"	Vedha	Kannadasan	T. M. Soundararajan
1966	Yaar Nee?	"Kannukenna Summa"	Vedha	Kannadasan	
1967	Anubavi Raja Anubavi	"Muthukulikka Vaareergala"	M. S. Viswanathan	Kannadasan	T. M. Soundararajan & M. S. Viswanathan
1967	Anubavi Raja Anubavi	"Anubavi Raja Anubavi"	M. S. Viswanathan	Kannadasan	P. Susheela
1967	Bama Vijayam	"Aani Muthu"	M. S. Viswanathan	Kannadasan	P. Susheela & Soolamangalam Rajalakshmi
1967	Bama Vijayam	"Aadai Mariya Pani"	M. S. Viswanathan	Kannadasan	P. Susheela
1967	Ethirigal Jakkirathai	"Aha Aha Indru"	Vedha	Kannadasan	
1967	Ethirigal Jakkirathai	"Jilukadi Jilukadi"	Vedha	Kannadasan	T. M. Soundararajan, P. Susheela & Seerkazhi Govindarajan
1967	Iru Malargal	"Kadavul Thantha"	M. S. Viswanathan		P. Susheela
1967	Kadhalithal Podhuma	""Kadhal Penne Kanniyar"	Vedha	Kannadasan	T. M. Soundararajan
1967	Kan Kanda Deivam	Paartthaal Pesalaam Pesi Pazhagalaam	K. V. Mahadevan		K. Jamuna Rani
1967	Karpooram	Ammaa Vaenumaa	D. B. Ramachandra	Vidvan Ve. Lakshmanan	
1967	Manam Oru Kurangu	"Aruppu Kotta Machchan"	D. B. Ramachandra		
1967	Manam Oru Kurangu	Beautiful Marvelous Excellent	D. B. Ramachandra		Seerkazhi Govindarajan
1967	Naan	"Vanthaal Ennodu Engeya"	T. K. Ramamoorthy	Kannadasan	
1967	Naan	"Ammano Saamiyo"	T. K. Ramamoorthy	Kannadasan	Seerkazhi Govindarajan
1967	Naan	"Naam Aanai Ittal"	T. K. Ramamoorthy		T. M. Soundararajan
1967	Ninaivil Nindraval	"Paravaigal Siraginaal Anaikka"	V. Kumar		
1967	Ooty Varai Uravu	"Raja Raja Sri"	M. S. Viswanathan	Kannadasan	P. B. Sreenivas
1967	Ooty Varai Uravu	"Yaarodum Pesakkoodathu"	M. S. Viswanathan	Kannadasan	P. B. Sreenivas
1967	Paaladai	"Appadi Enna Parvai"	K. V. Mahadevan	Kannadasan	P. Susheela
1967	Paaladai	"Duetu Duetu Padum"	K. V. Mahadevan	Kannadasan	Tharapuram Sundarrajan
1967	Pattanathil Bhootham	"Ithalai Virithathu Roja"	Govrdhanan	Kannadasan	T. M. Soundrarajan, Javar Seetharaman, Sarojadevi
1967	Pesum Dheivam	"Nooraandu Kaalam Vaazhga"	K. V. Mahadevan	Vaali	Sarala & Soolamangalam Rajalakshmi
1967	Sabash Thambi	"Aambala Singame" (Aiyaadio Aiyaadio)	S. M. Subbaiah Naidu	Vaali	S. C. Krishnan
1967	Sabash Thambi	"Oi Mama Ungal"	S. M. Subbaiah Naidu	Vaali	Pattom Sadan
1967	Selva Magal	"Vennila Mugam"	M. S. Viswanathan	Vaali	T. M. Soundararajan
1967	Thaikku Thalaimagan	"Ainthikku Mele"	K. V. Mahadevan	Kannadasan	
1967	Thangai	"Thathi Thathi"	M. S. Viswanathan	Kannadasan	
1967	Thangai	"Ninaithen Ennai"	M. S. Viswanathan	Kannadasan	
1967	Thanga Thambi	"Aaaraaro My Daarling Aaraaro"	K. V. Mahadevan		A. L. Raghavan
1967	Thiruvarutchelvar	"Aatthu Vellam Kaatthirukku"	K. V. Mahadevan	Kannadasan	A. L. Raghavan, S. C. Krishnan & T. M. Soundararajan
1967	Valiba Virundhu	"Vaaliba Virundhu"	R. Sudharsanam		T. M. Soundararajan & J. P. Chandrababu
1968	Chakkaram	"Oru Naal Iravu Orumani"	S. M. Subbaiah Naidu	Vaali	
1968	Delhi Mapillai	"Anda Bagirandamodu"	K. V. Mahadevan		S. V. Ponnusamy, S. C. Krishnan & T. M. Soundararajan
1968	Enga Oor Raja	"Parameshwari"	M. S. Viswanathan	Kannadasan	
1968	En Thambi	Munthi Munthi Vinayaganeya	M. S. Viswanathan	Kannadasan	Seerkazhi Govindarajan
1968	En Thambi	Thattattum Kai thazhuvattum	M. S. Viswanathan	Kannadasan	K. Balaji
1968	Galatta Kalyanam	"Engal Kalyanam"	M. S. Viswanathan	Vaali	T. M. Soundararajan, P. B. Sreenivas, P. Susheela & C. S. Ganesh
1968	Galatta Kalyanam	Uravinil	M. S. Viswanathan	Vaali	C. S. Ganesh
1968	Kallum Kaniyagum	"Birds on tree, Girls are free"	M. S. Viswanathan		
1968	Kanavan	Ennaporuthamadi Mama	M. S. Viswanathan	Vaali	
1968	Kannan En Kadhalan	"Minminiyei Kanmaniyai"	M. S. Viswanathan	Vaali	T. M. Soundararajan
1968	Kudiyirundha Koyil	"Un Vizhiyum En Vaalum"	M. S. Viswanathan	Vaali	T. M. Soundararajan
1968	Kudiyirundha Koyil	"Thuluvadho Ilamai"	M. S. Viswanathan	Vaali	T. M. Soundararajan
1968	Lakshmi Kalyanam	"Poottale Unnaiyum"	M. S. Viswanathan	Kannadasan	T. M. Soundararajan & A. L. Raghavan
1968	Moondrezhuthu	"Konjum Kili"	T. K. Ramamoorthy	Kannadasan	T. M. Soundararajan
1968	Moondrezhuthu	"Pachai Kili"	T. K. Ramamoorthy	Kannadasan	
1968	Neelagiri Express	"Vallibam Oru Velli Thattu"	T. K. Ramamoorthy	Kannadasan	T. M. Soundararajan
1968	Neelagiri Express	"Naan Kalaingan Alla"	T. K. Ramamoorthy	Kannadasan	T. M. Soundararajan
1968	Neelagiri Express	"Kalyana Pennai Konjam"	T. K. Ramamoorthy	Kannadasan	T. M. Soundararajan
1968	Neelagiri Express	"Kadavul Madhuvai Kangalil Aada"	T. K. Ramamoorthy	Kannadasan	
1968	Nimirndhu Nil	"Pudichalum Pudhicha Puliyankomba Pudicha "	M. S. Viswanathan		J. P. Chandrababu
1968	Oli Vilakku	"Mampazha Thottam"	M. S. Viswanathan	Vaali	Seerkazhi Govindarajan
1968	Oli Vilakku	Rukminiye	M. S. Viswanathan	Vaali	T. M. Soundararajan
1968	Oli Vilakku	"Naan Kanda Kanavinil"	M. S. Viswanathan	Vaali	
1968	Thillana Mohanambal	"Pandian Naanirukka" , “Nalandhana”, and “Marindirindhu Paarkum	K. V. Mahadevan	Kannadasan	S. C. Krishnan (Pandiyan Naanirukka) and P. Susheela ( Nalandhana and Marindirindhu Paarkum)
1968	Ragasiya Police 115	"Kannil Therikindra"	M. S. Viswanathan	Kannadasan	T. M. Soundararajan
1968	Ragasiya Police 115	"Paal Tamizh Paal"	M. S. Viswanathan	Vaali	T. M. Soundararajan
1968	Panama Pasama	"Yelantha Pazham"	K. V. Mahadevan	Kannadasan	
1968	Poovum Pottum	"Ponvandu Theendatha"	R. Govarthanam		
1968	Pudhiya Bhoomi	"Naanthandi Kaathi"	M. S. Viswanathan	Poovai Senguttavan	P. Susheela
1968	Thamarai Nenjam	"Adipodi Paithiyakari"	M. S. Viswanathan	Kannadasan	P. Susheela
1968	Thamarai Nenjam	"Mutrukai Porattam"	M. S. Viswanathan	Kannadasan	T. M. Soundararajan
1968	Uyira Maanama	"Kutrala Malaiyile"	M. S. Viswanathan	Vaali	Seerkazhi Govindarajan
1968	Uyira Maanama	"Savaale Samali"	M. S. Viswanathan	Vaali	T. M. Soundararajan
1969	Aayiram Poi	"Kaveri Thanniyil Kulichavadi"	V. Kumar	Kannadasan	Manorama
1969	Aindhu Laksham	Kaadhalukkoru Kaalej	S. M. Subbaiah Naidu	Thiruchi Thyagarajan	A. L. Raghavan
1969	Aindhu Laksham	Naalaikku Neramillai	S. M. Subbaiah Naidu	Kannadasan	
1969	Akka Thangai	"Maruvathu Society"	Shankar–Ganesh	Kannadasan	
1969	Anbalippu	"Gopalan Enge Undo"	M. S. Viswanathan	Kannadasan	T. M. Soundararajan, P. Susheela, Seerkazhi Govindarajan & Tharapuram Sundararajan
1969	Anbalippu	"Yeai Ennaku Therium"	M. S. Viswanathan	Kannadasan	
1969	Anjal Petti 520	"Pathu Pathinaru"	R. Govardhanam	Kannadasan	T. M. Soundararajan
1969	Anjal Petti 520	"Aathi Manithan"	R. Govardhanam	Vaali	
1969	Annaiyum Pithavum	"Ponnale Vaazhum Pudhiya Ulagam"	M. S. Viswanathan	Kannadasan	
1969	Annaiyum Pithavum	"Muthana Oorgaolamo"	M. S. Viswanathan	Kannadasan	
1969	Avare En Daivam	Azhage Unakku Gunam Irandu	T. R. Pappa		P. B. Sreenivas
1969	Kanne Pappa	"Kalathil Idhu Nalla"	M. S. Viswanathan	Kannadasan	
1969	Kanni Penn	"Adi Yendi"	M. S. Viswanathan		P. Susheela
1969	Kanni Penn	"Oli Piranthathu"	M. S. Viswanathan		T. M. Soundarrajan
1969	Kula Vilakku	Kondu Vandhaal Adhai Kondu Vaa	K. V. Mahadevan		A. L. Raghavan
1969	Magizhampoo	Aaalolam Aalolam Ooran Thottatthu	D. B. Ramachandra	Mayavanathan	A. P. Komala
1969	Magizhampoo	"Maampoo Magizhampoo"	D. B. Ramachandra	Mayavanathan	
1969	Naangu Killadigal	"Ethu Ethile"	Vedha		P. Susheela
1969	Naangu Killadigal	"Pookkadi Pakkam"	Vedha		S. V. Ponnusamy
1969	Nam Naadu	"Ninathathai Nadathiyae"	M. S. Viswanathan	Vaali	T. M. Soundararajan
1969	Nam Naadu	"Kudigaran Pechu"	M. S. Viswanathan	Vaali	
1969	Nam Naadu	"Naan 7 Vayasilae"	M. S. Viswanathan	Vaali	
1969	Nil Gavani Kadhali	"My Name is Rosy"	M. S. Viswanathan	Vaali	
1969	Nil Gavani Kadhali	"Kangalukkenna Kaval"	M. S. Viswanathan	Vaali	
1969	Nil Gavani Kadhali	"Engeyo Paartha Mugam"	M. S. Viswanathan	Vaali	P. B. Sreenivas
1969	Pennai Vazha Vidungal	Azhagile	S. M. Subbaiah Naidu	Kannadasan	
1969	Poova Thalaiya	"Adi Sarithan Podi"	M. S. Viswanathan	Vaali	T. M. Soundararajan
1969	Poova Thalaiya	"Paladai Meni"	M. S. Viswanathan	Vaali	P. Susheela
1969	Shanti Nilayam	"Pennai Parthum"	M. S. Viswanathan	Kannadasan	
1969	Sivandha Mann	"Muthamidum Nearmeppo"	M. S. Viswanathan	Kannadasan	Saibaba
1969	Sivandha Mann	"Pattathu Rani"	M. S. Viswanathan	Kannadasan	
1969	Thanga Surangam	Sakthi Thannadu	T. K. Ramamoorthy	Kannadasan	T. M. Soundararajan
1969	Thanga Surangam	Nadhiyae Madhuvanal	T. K. Ramamoorthy	Kannadasan	
1969	Thirudan	"Kottai Mathilmele"	M. S. Viswanathan	Kannadasan	T. M. Soundararajan
1969	Thirudan	"Ninaithapadi Kidaithathadi"	M. S. Viswanathan	Kannadasan	
1969	Thunaivan	"Gokulathil Oru Iravu"	K. V. Mahadevan		
1969	Ulagum Ivvalavudhan	"Ivalavuthan Ulagam"	Vedha	Kannadasan	T. M. Soundararajan
1969	Ulagum Ivvalavudhan	"Maavadu Paarunga Oorugaa Podunga"	Vedha	Kannadasan	
1969	Vaa Raja Vaa	"Kallellaam"	Kunnakudi Vaidyanathan		
1969	Vaa Raja Vaa	"Aadi Paadi Sirikka"	Kunnakudi Vaidyanathan		Sharada, M. R. Vijaya & L. R. Anjali
1969	Vaa Raja Vaa	"Unmai Ethu Poy Ethu"	Kunnakudi Vaidyanathan		

=== 1970s ===
==== 1970 ====
Film	Song	Composer(s)	Writer(s)	Co-artist(s)
Anadhai Anandhan	"Ingu Paarpathai"	K. V. Mahadevan	Kannadasan	
CID Shankar	"Antha Arayinile"	Vedha	Kannadasan	
CID Shankar	"Pattu Thikkuthadi"	Vedha	Kannadasan	S. V. Ponnusamy
En Annan	"Kannukku Theriyada"	K. V. Mahadevan	Vaali	P. B. Sreenivas
En Annan	"Aasai Iruku"	K. V. Mahadevan	Kannadasan	T. M. Soundararajan
Enga Mama	"Sorgam Pakkathil"	M. S. Viswanathan	Kannadasan	T. M. Soundararajan
Engal Thangam	"Dont Touch Mr X"	M. S. Viswanathan	Vaali	T. M. Soundararajan
Engirundho Vandhaal	"Hello My Darling Ippo"	M. S. Viswanathan	Kannadasan	Pattom Sadan
Ethirkalam	"Mounam Than Pesiyadho"	M. S. Viswanathan	Kannadasan	
Ethirkalam	"Vazndhu Parppom Raa Naina"	M. S. Viswanathan	Kannadasan	T. M. Soundararajan
Ethiroli	"Kalyanam Kalyanam"	K. V. Mahadevan	Vaali	A. L. Raghavan
Ethiroli	"Kunguma Chimizh"	K. V. Mahadevan	Vaali	T. M. Soundararajan
Ethiroli	"Maraththa Vachavan"	K. V. Mahadevan	Vaali	
Ethiroli	"Rajavum Vanthituvar"	K. V. Mahadevan	Vaali	
Ethiroli	"Unga Nalla Manasukku"	K. V. Mahadevan	Vaali	
Kaaviya Thalaivi	"Aarambam Indre Agattum"	M. S. Viswanathan	Kannadasan	S. P. Balasubramanyam
Kalam Vellum	"Maalaiyittom Pongalittom"	Sankar Ganesh	Kannadasan	Seerkazhi Govindarajan
Kalam Vellum	"Penn Oru Kannadi"	Sankar Ganesh	Kannadasan	
Maanavan	"One and Two Mudhal"	Sankar Ganesh	Vaali	
Maattukara Velan	"Oru Pakkam Parkkiral"	K. V. Mahadevan		T. M. Soundararajan
Maattukara Velan	"Poo Vaitha"	K. V. Mahadevan		T. M. Soundararajan & P. Susheela
Maattukara Velan	""Pattikada Pattanamma"	K. V. Mahadevan		T. M. Soundararajan
Malathi	Engi En	M. S. Viswanathan	Kannadasan	T. M. Soundararajan
Nadu Iravil	"Naalu Pakkam Eri"	S. Balachander	Vidwan Ve. Lakshmanan	
Nadu Iravil	"Naalu Pakkam Eri" - 2	S. Balachander	Vidwan Ve. Lakshmanan	
Paadhukaappu	"Nammalki Pyari"	M. S. Viswanathan	Kannadasan	J. P. Chandrababu
Paadhukaappu	"Naan Konjam Over"	M. S. Viswanathan	Kannadasan	
Penn Deivam	"Udhatile Enakku Oru Macham"	V. Kumar		
Raman Ethanai Ramanadi	"Chera Chola Pandiyar"	M. S. Viswanathan	Kannadasan	P. Madhuri
Sorgam	"Naalu Kaalu Sir"	M. S. Viswanathan	Kannadasan	A. L. Raghavan & S. V. Ponnusamy
Thalaivan	"Odayile Oru Thamarai Poo"	S. M. Subbaiah Naidu	Vaali	T. M. Soundararajan
Thedi Vandha Mappillai	"Adatha Ullagal"	M. S. Viswanathan	Kannadasan	
Thirumalai Thenkumari	"Madhurai Arasaalum"	Kunnakudi Vaidyanathan	Ulundurpettai Shanmugam	Seerkazhi Govindarajan & M. R. Vijaya
Thirumalai Thenkumari	"Thiralmani Kathirgal and Neelakkada"	Kunnakudi Vaidyanathan	Ulundurpettai Shanmugam	Seerkazhi Govindarajan
Veettuku Veedu	"Angam Puthuvitham"	M. S. Viswanathan	Kannadasan	S. P. Balasubramanyam
Veettuku Veedu	"Naam Iruvarum Sugam"	M. S. Viswanathan	Kannadasan	
Veettuku Veedu	"Samantham Jadaili" (Thattungal Thirakattum)	M. S. Viswanathan	Kannadasan	
Vietnam Veedu	My Lady Cut Body	K. V. Mahadevan	Kannadasan	A. L. Raghavan

==== 1971 ====
Film	Song	Composer(s)	Writer(s)	Co-artist(s)
Arunodhayam	"Etharkkum Thayar"	K. V. Mahadevan	Kannadasan	
Avalukendru Or Manam	Ellorum Paarkka"	M. S. Viswanathan	Kannadasan	
Babu	"Aadhi Mudhale"	M. S. Viswanathan	Vaali	T. M. Soundararajan, Seerkazhi Govindarajan & S. C. Krishnan
Babu	"Antha Kalathil"	M. S. Viswanathan	Vaali	
Babu	"Enna Solla"	M. S. Viswanathan	Vaali	S. P. Balasubrahmanyam
Iru Thuruvam	Mullai Poo Pole"	M. S. Viswanathan	Kannadasan	
Kumari Kottam	"Adi Maddhalam Kotti"	M. S. Viswanathan	Alangudi Somu	
Kumari Kottam	"Aaduvathu Udalukku"	M. S. Viswanathan	Pulamaipithan	
Kumari Kottam	Naam Oruvarai"	M. S. Viswanathan	Vaali	T. M. Soundararajan
Meendum Vazhven	Velli Muthukal"	M. S. Viswanathan	Kannadasan	S. P. Balasubrahmanyam
Meendum Vazhven	"Valiban Sonna"	M. S. Viswanathan	Kannadasan	
Meendum Vazhven	"Thottum Thodathathu"	M. S. Viswanathan	Kannadasan	
Meendum Vazhven	"Unna Nenacha Konjam"	M. S. Viswanathan	Kannadasan	A. L. Raghavan
Meendum Vazhven	Vaangayaa Vaanga"	M. S. Viswanathan	Kannadasan	Jikki
Moondru Dheivangal	Nee Oru Chellapillai"	M. S. Viswanathan	Kannadasan	
Muhammad bin Tughluq	Pallandu Pallandu	M. S. Viswanathan	Vaali	S. P. Balasubrahmanyam, Saibaba, K. Veeramani & Radha
Naangu Suvargal	Naan Oru Paattu	M. S. Viswanathan		
Neerum Neruppum	Kattu Mella Kattu"	M. S. Viswanathan	Vaali	
Neerum Neruppum	Viruntho Nalla Virunthu"	M. S. Viswanathan	Vaali, Vayalar Ramavarma, Kosaraju & Vijaya Narasimha	K. Veeramani, Pattom Sadhan, Pithapuram Nageswara Rao, T. A. Mothi & J. V. Raghavalu
Nootrukku Nooru	Boologama?"	V. Kumar		
Praptham	Idhu Margazhi Madham"	M. S. Viswanathan	Kannadasan	
Rickshawkaran	Ponnazhaguppenmai	M. S. Viswanathan	Vaali	P. Susheela
Sabatham	"Nenjukku Neethi Undu"	G. K. Venkatesh	Kannadasan	Seerkazhi Govindarajan
Sabatham	"Aattathai Aadu Puliyudan"	G. K. Venkatesh	Kannadasan	A. L. Raghavan
Savaale Samali	"Ennadi Mayakkama"	M. S. Viswanathan	Kannadasan	P. Susheela
Sudarum Sooravaliyum	Anubhavam Thaanae Varavendum"	M. S. Viswanathan	Kannadasan	T. M. Soundararajan
Sumathi En Sundari	Ellorukkum Kaalam Varum"	M. S. Viswanathan	Kannadasan	A. L. Raghavan
Sumathi En Sundari	"Ye Pille Sachayi"	M. S. Viswanathan	Kannadasan	T. M. Soundararajan, A. L. Raghavan
Thanga Gopuram	"Muthu Tamil Maduraiyin"	S. M. Subbaiah Naidu	Kannadasan	P. Susheela & Anjali Kousalya
Thanga Gopuram	"Maamalai Seithapillai"	S. M. Subbaiah Naidu	Kannadasan	P. Susheela & Anjali Kousalya
Thanga Gopuram	"Rajathi Rajathi"	S. M. Subbaiah Naidu	Kannadasan	
Thangaikkaaga	Azhage Nee Oru"	M. S. Viswanathan	Kannadasan	P. Susheela
Thangaikkaaga	Vellikkizhamai	M. S. Viswanathan	Kannadasan	Saibaba
Then Kinnam	"Utharavindri Ulley Vaa"	Sankar Ganesh	Kumara Devan	T. M. Soundararajan
Thenum Paalum	Ottukketkum Pengale	M. S. Viswanathan	Vaali	
Uttharavindri Ulle Vaa	Utharavindri Ulle Vaa"	M. S. Viswanathan	Kannadasan	T. M. Soundararajan & S. P. Balasubrahmanyam
Uttharavindri Ulle Vaa	"Unnai Thoduvathu Iniyathu"	M. S. Viswanathan	Kannadasan	S. P. Balasubrahmanyam P. Susheela & Saibaba
Uttharavindri Ulle Vaa	"Theanaatrangaraiyinile"	M. S. Viswanathan	Kannadasan	

==== 1972 ====
Film	Song	Composer(s)	Writer(s)	Co-artist(s)
Agathiyar	"Kannai Pole Mannai Kakkum"	Kunnakudi Vaidyanathan	Puthuneri Subramnyam	
Avasara Kalyanam	"Kathirundhen Mama Kaividalama"	T. R. Pappa	Kannadasan	
Dharmam Engey	"Pattukkaran Paadi"	M. S. Viswanathan	Vaali	T. M. Soundararajan
Dharmam Engey	"Naangu Kaalamum"	M. S. Viswanathan	Vaali	S. Janaki
Dhikku Theriyadha Kaattil	"Veeram Ennum Paavai"	M. S. Viswanathan	Kannadasan	S. P. Balasubrahmanyam, B. Vasantha & Saibaba
Dhikku Theriyadha Kaattil	"Kuliradikuthey"	M. S. Viswanathan	Kannadasan	S. P. Balasubrahmanyam, M. L. Srikanth & S. Janaki
Kadhalikka Vanga	"Aa Aa Azhagae"	J. V. Raghavulu	Veerapandian	
Kanna Nalama	"Pakkathu Rajavukku"	M. S. Viswanathan	Kannadasan	
Kasethan Kadavulada	"Mella Pesungal"	M. S. Viswanathan	Vaali	Kovai Soundararajan
Kurathi Magan	"Nattukkulle"	K. V. Mahadevan		Seerkazhi Govindarajan
Nawab Naarkali	"Yemma Kanna Athisayama"	M. S. Viswanathan	Kannadasan	
Nawab Naarkali	"Yendi Kanna Athisayama"	M. S. Viswanathan	Kannadasan	
Pattikada Pattanama	"Kettukodi Urumi"	M. S. Viswanathan	Kannadasan	T. M. Soundararajan
Pillaiyo Pillai	"Gundooru Hamumanthappa Enga"	M. S. Viswanathan	Vaali	T. M. Soundararajan & A. L. Raghavan
Raja	"Naan Uyirukku Tharuvatu"	M. S. Viswanathan	Kannadasan	
Raman Thediya Seethai	"En Ullam Unthan"	M. S. Viswanathan	Kannadasan	T. M. Soundararajan
Raman Thediya Seethai	"Machchana Mamavaa"	M. S. Viswanathan	Vaali	
Raman Thediya Seethai	"Padaar Padaar Padaar"	M. S. Viswanathan	Vaali	T. M. Soundararajan
Raman Thediya Seethai	"Yea Annaa"	M. S. Viswanathan	Vaali	Saibaba & Soolamangalam Rajalakshmi
Rani Yaar Kuzhanthai	Dingiri Dingiri Daa	T. V. Raju		S. P. Balasubramanyam
Shakthi Leelai	"Sakthi Vandhaladi"	T. K. Ramamoorthy	Kannadasan	
Sange Muzhangu	"Naam Solliththara"	M. S. Viswanathan	Kannadasan	
Sange Muzhangu	"Silar Kudippathupole"	M. S. Viswanathan	Kannadasan	T. M. Soundararajan
Thavapudhalavan	"Love Is Fine Darling"	M. S. Viswanathan	Randor Guy & Vaali	Ajit Singh
Vasantha Maligai	"Kudimagane"	M. S. Viswanathan	K. V. Mahadevan	T. M. Soundararajan
Vasantha Maligai	Oru Kinnathai"	M. S. Viswanathan	K. V. Mahadevan	T. M. Soundararajan, B. Vasantha
Velli Vizha	"Kaathoduthaan Dhaan"	V. Kumar	Vaali	
Velli Vizha	"Kainiraiya Chozhi"	V. Kumar	Vaali	P. Susheela

==== 1973 ====
Film	Song	Composer(s)	Writer(s)	Co-artist(s)
Amman Arul	"Milli Aduchen Nooru Milli"	Sankar Ganesh	Vaali	Ganesh
Anbu Sagodharargal	"Ungalachu Engalukachu"	K. V. Mahadevan	Vaali	T. M. Soundararajan
Anbu Sagodharargal	"Ammamma Ammamma"	K. V. Mahadevan	Vaali	S. P. Balasubrahmanyam
Arangetram	"Mappilai Ragasiyam"	V. Kumar	Kannadasan	
Baghdad Perazhagi	"Padi Padi"	M. S. Viswanathan	Pulamaipithan	Saibaba
Baghdad Perazhagi	"Naan Kuduchu"	M. S. Viswanathan	Pulamaipithan	S. Janaki
Baghdad Perazhagi	"Vanga Ungalathan Vanga"	M. S. Viswanathan	Pulamaipithan	
Baghdad Perazhagi	"Naadu Naadu"	M. S. Viswanathan	Pulamaipithan	
Bharatha Vilas	"Indhiya Naadu"	M. S. Viswanathan	Vaali	T. M. Soundararajan, M. S. Viswanathan, K. Veeramani, P. Suseela, A. R. Raghavan & Malaysia Vasudevan
Engal Thanga Raja	"Muthangal Nooru"	K. V. Mahadevan	Kannadasan	T. M. Soundararajan
Ganga Gowri	"Ennamma Annamma"	M. S. Viswanathan	Kannadasan	T. M. Soundararajan
Ganga Gowri	"Adi Yendiamma"	M. S. Viswanathan	Kannadasan	S. Janaki
Gauravam	"Adhisaya Ulagam"	M. S. Viswanathan	Kannadasan	
Kasi Yathirai	"Azhagin Avatharam"	Sankar Ganesh		
Kasi Yathirai	"Ammadio Chithappa"	Sankar Ganesh		S. P. Balasubrahmanyam, Rajendra Krishna, Kovai Sundarrajan & B. S. Sasirekha
Manidharil Manikkam	"Raathirikku Raathiri"	M. S. Viswanathan	Vaali	
Manipayal	"Engal Tamil Annai.... Kanchiyile Oru Buthan"	M. S. Viswanathan	Pulamaipithan	Seerkazhi Govindarajan
Manipayal	"Enadi Ammo"	M. S. Viswanathan	Pulamaipithan	Latha, Radha & Pushpalatha
Manipayal	"Naan Ullai"	M. S. Viswanathan	Vaali	
Pattikaattu Ponnaiya	"Dididi Saathukudi"	K. V. Mahadevan	Kannadasan	
Ponnunjal	"Inbathil Malartha"	M. S. Viswanathan	Selvabharathy	
Ponnukku Thanga Manasu	"Penn Ullame"	G. K. Venkatesh	Poovai Senguttuvan	P. Susheela
Ponvandu	"Naan Oru Thani Ragam"	V. Kumar		
Ponvandu	"Adi Vaadiyamma"	V. Kumar		T. M. Soundararajan P. Susheela & K. Swarna
Pookkari	"Muppathu Paisa"	M. S. Viswanathan		
Rajaraja Cholan	"Mayakkum Mannan"	Kunnakudi Vaidyanathan	K. D. Santhanam	
Rajaraja Cholan	"Mathennai Padaithaan"	Kunnakudi Vaidyanathan	Thirunavukarasar	T. M. Soundararajan, S. P. Balasubrahmanyam & M. R. Vijaya
Sollathaan Ninaikkiren	"Kalyanam Kachari"	M. S. Viswanathan	Vaali	S. P. Balasubrahmanyam
Thedi Vandha Lakshmi	"Jilpana Jilpana"	M. S. Sanjay	Kannadasan	
Thirumalai Deivam	"Ezhumalai Naanga Vazhum"	Kunnakudi Vaidyanathan		
Ulagam Sutrum Valiban	"Bansaayee"	M. S. Viswanathan	Vaali	T. M. Soundararajan
Vandhaale Magaraasi	"Yethanaio Pei Irukku"	Sankar Ganesh	Vaali	
Veettukku Vandha Marumagal	"Sammanthi Veettamma "	Sankar Ganesh	Kannadasan	

==== 1974 ====
Film	Song	Composer(s)	Writer(s)	Co-artist(s)
Anbu Thangai	Vaangadi Vaanga"	K. V. Mahadevan		P. Susheela
Athaiya Mamiya	Marandhe Pochu	M. S. Viswanathan	Vaali	S. P. Balasubrahmanyam
Athaiya Mamiya	Athaiya Mamiya Angaya Ingaya	M. S. Viswanathan	Vaali	P. Susheela
Aval Oru Thodar Kathai	Adi Ennadi Ulagam"	M. S. Viswanathan	Kannadasan	
Dheerga Sumangali	Welcome	M. S. Viswanathan	Kannadasan	
En Magan	"Sollathe Sollathe"	M. S. Viswanathan	Kannadasan	
Engamma Sapatham	Ennaiya Mulikare"	Vijaya Bhaskar	Panchu Arunachalam	
Maanikka Thottil	"Samathana Maappillai"	M. S. Viswanathan	Kannadasan	S. Janaki
Maanikka Thottil	"Annam Ingay"	M. S. Viswanathan	Kannadasan	
Naan Avanillai (1974 film)	Inge Naan"	M. S. Viswanathan	Kannadasan	Saibaba
Panathukkaga	Sangeetham Eppothum Sugamanathu"	M. S. Viswanathan	Kannadasan	S. P. Balasubrahmanyam
Paruva Kaalam	Velvettu Pattu"	G. Devarajan	Pulamaipithan	
Sirithu Vazha Vendum	"Nee Ennai Vittu"	M. S. Viswanathan	Pulamaipithan	
Sivagamiyin Selvan	Aadikku Pinne"	M. S. Viswanathan	Kannadasan	T. M. Soundararajan
Sumathi En Sundari	"Ellorukkum Kaalam Varum"	M. S. Viswanathan	Kannadasan	A. L. Raghavan & Saibaba
Sumathi En Sundari	"Ye Pille Sachayi"	M. S. Viswanathan	Kannadasan	T. M. Soundararajan & A. L. Raghavan
Thirumangalyam	Ulagam Namadhu Veedendru Sollungal"	M. S. Viswanathan	Kannadasan	
Urimaikural	Ambilaingala Ninga"	M. S. Viswanathan	Kannadasan	
Urimaikural	"Mattikittaradi"	M. S. Viswanathan	Vaali	

==== 1975 ====
Film	Song	Composer(s)	Writer(s)	Co-artist(s)
Aan Pillai Singam	"Seerthuko Kasu "	Vijaya Bhaskar		
Aayirathil Oruthi	"Ninaithathai Mudipathu"	T. K. Ramamoorthy	Avinashi Mani	S. P. Balasubrahmanyam
Anbe Aaruyire	"Pattanathu Mappillaikku"	M. S. Viswanathan	Vaali	T. M. Soundararajan
Cinema Paithiyam	"I Will Sell My Beauty"	Sankar Ganesh		
Mannavan Vanthaanadi	"Rajasthanil Yaro Oruvan"	M. S. Viswanathan	Kannadasan	T. M. Soundararajan
Naalai Namadhe	"Naanoru Medai Paadagan"	M. S. Viswanathan	Vaali	T. M. Soundararajan & S. P. Balasubrahmanyam
Naalai Namadhe	"En Edaiyilum" (Love Is A Game)	M. S. Viswanathan	Vaali	S. P. Balasubrahmanyam & Saïbaba
Pattikkaattu Raja	"Kettukadi Chinnakutti"	Sankar Ganesh	Vaali	T. M. Soundararajan
Then Sindhudhe Vaanam	Vaa Vaa Kuttappa"	V. Kumar	Vaali	
Vaazhnthu Kaattugiren	"Hello sir, Good"	M. S. Viswanathan	Kannadasan	
Vaira Nenjam	"Adi Karthigai Masamadi"	M. S. Viswanathan	Kannadasan	T. M. Soundararajan
Vaira Nenjam	"Amman Magan"	M. S. Viswanathan	Kannadasan	

==== 1976 ====
Film	Song	Composer(s)	Writer(s)	Co-artist(s)
Unakkaga Naan	"Kaadu Vetta"	M. S. Viswanathan		S. C. Krishnan & Manorama
Chitra Pournami	"Kalam Undu Paruvam Undu"	M. S. Viswanathan	Kannadasan	
Lalitha	"Ennamma"	M. S. Viswanathan	Kannadasan	T. M. Soundararajan
Manmadha Leelai	"Hello My Dear Wrong Number"	M. S. Viswanathan	Kannadasan	K. J. Yesudas
Moondru Mudichu	"Naanoru Kadhanayagi"	M. S. Viswanathan	Kannadasan	P. Susheela
Thunive Thunai	"Kaiyil Poo Eduppom"	M. S. Viswanathan	Kannadasan	L. R. Anjali
Vazhvu En Pakkam	"Theerthathil Vizhutha Vandu"	M. S. Viswanathan	Kannadasan	Saibaba

==== 1977 ====
Film	Song	Composer(s)	Writer(s)	Co-artist(s)
Aarupushpangal	"Alagar Malayil"	M. S. Viswanathan	Kannadasan	
Aarupushpangal	"Vaazhvarasi Thaaye"	M. S. Viswanathan	Kannadasan	T. M. Soundararajan
Aarupushpangal	"Atha Maga"	M. S. Viswanathan	Kannadasan	B. S. Sasirekha & L. R. Anjali
Avan Oru Sarithiram	"Inkkum Kannangal"	M. S. Viswanathan	Kannadasan	
Pattina Pravesam	"Vaangadi Chittukkala"	M. S. Viswanathan	Kannadasan	

==== 1978 ====
Film	Song	Composer(s)	Writer(s)	Co-artist(s)
Aayiram Jenmangal	"Naan Adatha Attamillai"	M. S. Viswanathan	Kannadasan	
Ennai Pol Oruvan	"Izhu Izhu"	M. S. Viswanathan	Kannadasan	T. M. Soundararajan
Justice Gopinath	"Adiye Nee"	M. S. Viswanathan	Vaali	Malaysia Vasudevan
Pilot Premnath	"Azhagi Oruthi"	M. S. Viswanathan	Vaali	P. Jayachandran
Sadhurangam	"Aarambham"	V. Kumar	Vaali	S. Janaki
Taxi Driver	"Ragasiyasurangathil"	M. S. Viswanathan		S. P. Balasubrahmanyam
Vanakkatukuriya Kathaliye	"Kottu Kottu"	M. S. Viswanathan	Vaali	S. P. Balasubrahmanyam
Varuvan Vadivelan	"Batthu Malai"	M. S. Viswanathan	Kannadasan	Seerkazhi Govindarajan, P. Susheela, M. S. Viswanathan, T. M. Soundararajan & Bangalore A. R. Ramani Ammal
Varuvan Vadivelan	"Ah! Paaru Paaru Paaru"	M. S. Viswanathan	Kannadasan	L. R. Anjali

==== 1979 ====
Film	Song	Composer(s)	Writer(s)	Co-artist(s)
Gnana Kuzhandhai	"Kolli Malai Kattulle"	K. V. Mahadevan		
Kuppathu Raja	"Kodikatti Parakkudada"	M. S. Viswanathan	Kannadasan	T. M. Soundararajan, Malaysia Vasudevan & Manorama
Ninaithale Inikkum	"Inimai Nirainda Ulagam"	M. S. Viswanathan	Kannadasan	S. P. Balasubrahmanyam
Ninaithale Inikkum	"Aananda Thaandavamo"	M. S. Viswanathan	Kannadasan	S. P. Balasubrahmanyam
Thisai Maariya Paravaigal	"Adraa Melatha Rajaa"	M. S. Viswanathan	Pulamaipithan	Kovai Soundararajan

=== 1980s ===
Year	Film	Song	Composer(s)	Writer(s)	Co-artist(s)
1980	Billa (1980 film)	"Ninaithale Inikkum Sugame"	M. S. Viswanathan	Kannadasan	
1980	Avan Aval Adhu	"Andha Naal Mudharkkondu"	M. S. Viswanathan	Kannadasan	Manorama
1980	Bhama Rukmani	"Take Somebody"	M. S. Viswanathan		Joseph Krishna
1980	Dharma Raja (film)	"Gum Gum Gumthalakka"	M. S. Viswanathan	Kannadasan	
1980	Idhayaththil Ore Idam	"Manappaarai Santhaiyile"	Ilaiyaraaja		Chandran
1980	Jamboo	"Oh Rama Oh Rama"	Shankar-Ganesh		
1981	47 Natkal	"Ival Unai Ninaikkum Podhe"	M. S. Viswanathan	Kannadasan	
1981	Thee (1981 film)	"Vaare Vaa idhu"	M. S. Viswanathan	Kannadasan	
1982	Krodham	"Vaanam Nalla"	Shankar Ganesh		
1982	Pagadai Panirendu	"Life Is a Game"	K. Chakravarthy		
1982	Paritchaikku Neramaachu	"Naa Aatthu Paakam Kulikka Pona"	M. S. Viswanathan	Vaali	
1982	Theerpu	"Hey Mr. Ungalathan"	M. S. Viswanathan	Vaali	
1983	Saranalayam	"Namma Sangiliyil"	M. S. Viswanathan		
1984	Sarithira Nayagan	"Kudichukka"	M. S. Viswanathan		
1984	Sarithira Nayagan	"Therinjpochu"	M. S. Viswanathan		
1984	Nenjathai Allitha	"Ammadi Teynampettai"	M. S. Viswanathan		Malaysia Vasudevan

=== 1990s ===
Year	Film	Song	Composer(s)	Writer(s)	Co-artist(s)
1991	Gnana Paravai	Chinna Chinna	M. S. Viswanathan		

=== 2011-2020 ===
Year	Film	Song	Composer(s)	Writer(s)	Co-artist(s)
2011	Osthe	"Kalasala Kalasala"	S. Thaman	Vaali	T. Rajendar, Solar Sai
2012	Thadaiyara Thaakka	"Naan Poonthamalli"	S. Thaman	Vaali	Solar Sai, Arun Vijay
2013	Arya Surya	"Thagadu Thagadu"	Srikanth Deva	T. Rajendar	
2014	Athithi	"Jaipuril Jaipuril"	Bharadwaj	Pa. Vijay	
2015	Savaale Samaali	"Nallavana Kettavana"	S. Thaman	Snehan	Anthony Daasan
2019	LKG	"Thamizh Anthem"	Leon James	Pa. Vijay	P. Susheela, Vani Jayaram, Sid Sriram, Chinmayi
2020	Mookuthi Amman	"Aadi Kuththu"	Girishh G	Pa. Vijay	
2023	Priyamudan Priya	"Adhi Kaalaiyil"	Srikanth Deva	Jeevan Mayil	Vani Jairam

== Telugu songs ==
=== 1960s ===
Year	Film	Song	Composer(s)	Writer(s)	Co-artist(s)
1965	Aada Brathuku	"Kali Muvvalu Ghallumane"	M. S. Viswanathan, Rama Murthy	C. Narayana Reddy	Pithapuram Nageswara Rao
1966	Potti Pleader	"Po Po Po Po Potti Pleader"	S. P. Kodandapani	Appalacharya	Padmanabham
1966	Monagallaku Monagadu	"Chusanoi Neelanti"	Vedha	Kosaraju Raghavaiah	
1966	Monagallaku Monagadu	"Kannu Chedhiri Poyinadhoi"	Vedha	Kosaraju Raghavaiah	
1966	Pidugu Ramudu	"Nindu Manasa"	T. V. Raju	Kosaraju Raghavaiah	Madhavapeddi Satyam
1966	Pidugu Ramudu	"Rangulu Rangulu"	T. V. Raju	C. Narayana Reddy	P. Susheela
1966	Adugu Jaadalu	"Bhayamu Vadelenule"	Master Venu	Kosaraju	P. B. Sreenivas
1966	Aggi Barata	"Churuku Churuku"	Vijaya Krishna Murthy	Kosaraju	Madhavapeddi Satyam
1966	Aggi Barata	"Cham Cham Gurram"	Vijaya Krishna Murthy	G. K. Murthy	Basaweswar, Raghavulu
1968	Nenante Nene	"Ambavo Shakthivo Ankala Devivo"	S. P. Kodandapani	Kosaraju Raghavaiah	Madhavapeddi Satyam
1969	Kathanayakudu	"Pallandi Pallu"	T. V. Raju	Kosaraju Raghavaiah	

=== 1970s ===
Year	Film	Song	Composer(s)	Writer(s)	Co-artist(s)
1971	Prema Nagar	"Le Le Le Naa Raja"	K. V. Mahadevan	Acharya Aatreya	Ghantasala
1976	Manchiki Maro Peru	"Vippe Monagadu"	S. Rajeswara Rao	Aarudhra	
1978	Sati Savitri	"Abhayamvamma"	Ghantasala, Pendyala Nageswara Rao	Kosaraju	P. Susheela
1978	Sati Savitri	"Aaha Pellamante"	Ghantasala, Pendyala Nageswara Rao	Acharya Aatreya	Madhavapeddi Ramesh
1979	Andamaina Anubhavam	"Ananda Thandavamo"	M. S. Viswanathan		
1979	Andamaina Anubhavam	"Andamaina Lokamundi"	M. S. Viswanathan		S. P. Balasubrahmanyam

=== 2010s ===
Year	Film	Song	Composer(s)	Writer(s)	Co-artist(s)
2012	All the Best (film)	"Thuogoji Pagoji - 1"	Hemachandra	Geetha Poonik	Mano

=== 2020s ===
Year	Film	Song	Composer(s)	Writer(s)	Co-artist(s)
2020	Ammoru Thalli	Ammoru Thalliki	Girishh G	Rahman	R.J. Balaji

== Kannada songs ==
=== 1960s ===
Year	Film	Song	Composer(s)	Writer(s)	Co-artist(s)
1965	Pathala Mohini	"O Brahmachaari"	Rajan–Nagendra	Hunsur Krishnamurthy	Nagendra
1965	Naga Pooja	"O Premada Poojaari"	T. G. Lingappa	Geetha Priya	
1965	Naga Pooja	"Sei Sei Sei Ennuva"	T. G. Lingappa	Geetha Priya	
1965	Bettada Huli	"Attheya Magale"	T. G. Lingappa	Geethapriya	S. Janaki, Rudrappa
1969	Kappu Bilupu	"Bhale Brahmachari"	R. Rathna	R. N. Jayagopal	
1969	Kappu Bilupu	"Cheluvina Kenneye"	R. Rathna	R. N. Jayagopal	
1969	Maduve Maduve Maduve	"Kannina Notavu"	Satyam	Geetha Priya	
1969	Mallammana Pavaada	"Ee Roopa Rashi"	Vijaya Bhaskar		
1969	Choori Chikkanna	"Cycle Mele Banda"	Chellapilla Satyam	Chi. Udaya Shanka	S. Janaki
1969	Choori Chikkanna	"Madayya Bandeya"	Chellapilla Satyam	Chi. Udaya Shanka	
1969	Mayor Muthanna	"Hello Hello"	Rajan–Nagendra	Chi. Udaya Shanka	
1969	Mayor Muthanna	"Haavige Mungusiyuntu"	Rajan–Nagendra	Chi. Udaya Shanka	P. B. Sreenivas, Dwarakish
1969	Mayor Muthanna	"Ayyayyayyo Hallimukka"	Rajan–Nagendra	Chi. Udaya Shanka	

=== 1970s ===
Year	Film	Song	Composer(s)	Writer(s)	Co-artist(s)
1970	Paropakari	"Jokey Naanu Balliya Minchu"	Upendra Kumar	Chi. Udaya Shankar	
1970	Sedige Sedu	"Muddu Maava"	Chellapilla Satyam	Chi. Udaya Shankar	
1970	Hasiru Thorana	Ee Meenantha Hennu	Upendra Kumar		
1970	Karulina Kare	"Nannavarige Yaaru Saati"	M. Ranga Rao	R. N. Jayagopal	S. Janaki
1970	Hasiru Thorana	"Ee Meenantha Hennu"	Upendra Kumar		
1970	Bhoopathi Ranga	"Rasika Rasika"	Vijaya Bhaskar	Geethapriya	
1970	Bhale Jodi	"Navile Navile"	R. Rathna	R. N. Jayagopal	
1970	Bhale Jodi	"Manikyadantha Maavayya"	R. Rathna	Chi. Udaya Shankar	P. B. Sreenivas
1970	Baalu Belagithu	"Hennu Aadidaaga"	Vijaya Bhaskar		
1971	Samshaya Phala	"Tharunya Thumbi"	Salil Chowdhary	Ku. Ra. Seetharama Sastry	
1971	Samshaya Phala	"Dooradinda Bandantha"	Salil Chowdhary	Ku. Ra. Seetharama Sastry	
1971	Bhale Adrushtavo Adrushta	Kannadathi O Gelathi"	Vijaya Bhaskar	K. S. L. Swamy	P. B. Sreenivas
1971	Kasidre Kailasa	Sarasakagali"	Satyam	Chi. Udaya Shankar	S. P. Balasubrahmanyam
1971	Thayi Devaru	"Baalu Embudu"	G. K. Venkatesh	Chi. Udaya Shankar	
1971	Namma Samsara	"O My Darling"	M. Ranga Rao		
1971	Kasturi Nivasa	"Oh Geleya"	G. K. Venkatesh	R. N. Jayagopal	
1972	Bhale Huchcha	"Yaaru Neenu"	Ranjan-Nagendra	Vijaya Narasimha	P. B. Sreenivas
1972	Hrudaya Sangama	"Yaaru Nee Yaaru"	Vijaya Bhaskar	Chi. Udaya Shankar	
1972	Janma Rahasya	"Dhummaana Yeke"	M. Ranga Rao		
1972	Sipayi Ramu	"Kokorekoko Kokorekoko Ko"	Upendra Kumar	R. N. Jayagopal	S. P. Balasubrahmanyam
1972	Kranti Veera	"Karinaaga Marinaaga"	Satyam	Chi. Udaya Shankar	
1972	Jaga Mecchida Maga	"Yeri Mele Yeri"	Satyam	Hunsur Krishnamurthy	S. P. Balasubrahmanyam

=== 2000-2010s ===
Year	Film	Song	Composer(s)	Writer(s)	Co-artist(s)
2013	Victory	Yakka Nin Magalu"	Arjun Janya	Shivu Byargi	Kailash Kher

== Malayalam songs ==
Year	Film	Song	Composer(s)	Writer(s)	Co-artist(s)
1973	Jesus	"Ente Munthirichaarino"	M. S. Viswanathan	P. Bhaskaran	
1973	Panitheeratha Veedu	"Maaril Syamanthakarathnam Chaarthi"	M. S. Viswanathan	Vayalar Ramavarma	
1973	Panchavadi	Symphony Symphony	M. K. Arjunan	Sreekumaran Thampi	Ayiroor Sadasivan
1973	Aaradhika	Chottaannikkara Bhagavathi"	M. S. Baburaj	Sreekumaran Thampi	
1973	Urvashi Bharathi	Penninenthorazhaku"	V. Dakshinamoorthy	Thikkurissy Sukumaran Nair	
1973	Ladies Hostel	Chithravarnna Kodikal"	M. S. Baburaj	Sreekumaran Thampi	
1973	Kaadu (1973 Malayalam film)	Veno Veno"	Vedpal Verma	Sreekumaran Thampi	P. B. Sreenivas
1974	Aval Oru Thodar Kathai (D)	Edi Enthedi"	M. S. Viswanathan	Vayalar Ramavarma	
1974	Kanyakumari	"Aayiram Kannulla"	M. B. Sreenivasan	Vayalar Ramavarma	
1982	Aayudham	"Raaga Madhurima"	A. T. Ummer	Sathyan Anthikkad	K. J. Yesudas

== Hindi songs ==
Year	Film	Song	Composer(s)	Writer(s)	Co-artist(s)
1972	Pistolwali	"Udati Si Chidiya"	Sathyam		
