= List of Tamil films of 1966 =

The following is a list of films produced in the Tamil film industry in India in 1966, in alphabetical order.

== 1966 ==
| Title | Director | Producer | Music | Cast |
|---|---|---|---|---|
| Anbe Vaa | A. C. Tirulokchandar | A.V.M. Productions | M. S. Viswanathan | M. G. Ramachandran, B. Saroja Devi, Nagesh, Asogan |
| Annavin Aasai | Dada Mirasi | Sujatha Cine Arts | K. V. Mahadevan | Gemini Ganesan, Savitri, K. Balaji, K. R. Vijaya |
| Avan Pithana? | P. Neelakantan | Umayal Productions | R. Parthasarathi | S. S. Rajendran, C. R. Vijayakumari, S. V. Sahasranamam |
| Chandrodayam | K. Shankar | Saravana Films | M. S. Viswanathan | M. G. Ramachandran, Jayalalitha, M. R. Radha, Nagesh |
| Chinnanchiru Ulagam | K. S. Gopalakrishnan | Chitra Productions | K. V. Mahadevan | Gemini Ganesan, K. R. Vijaya, Nagesh, Magic Radhika |
| Chitthi | K. S. Gopalakrishnan | Chitra Productions | M. S. Viswanathan | Gemini Ganesan, Padmini, M. R. Radha, R. Muthuraman, Vijayasree, Vijaya Nirmala, Baby Rani |
| Enga Paappa | B. R. Panthulu | Padmini Pictures | M. S. Viswanathan | Ravichandran, Kumari Bharathi, Nagesh, K. A. Thangavelu, M. V. Rajamma, Manorama |
| Gowri Kalyanam | K. Shankar | Saravana Combines | M. S. Viswanathan | Jaishankar, Ravichandran, Jayalalitha |
| Iru Vallavargal | K. V. Srinivasan | Modern Theaters | Vedha | Jaishankar, R. S. Manohar, L. Vijayalakshmi |
| Kathal Paduthum Padu | Joseph Thaliath Jr. | Citadel Studios | T. R. Pappa | Jaishankar, Vanishree, Jayanthi |
| Kattu Malligai | P. Subramanyam | Merryland Pictures | G. Devarajan | Prem Nazir, Vijaya Lalitha |
| Kodimalar | Sridhar | Sri Productions | M. S. Viswanathan | Muthuraman, A. V. M. Rajan, C. R. Vijayakumari, Nagesh, Kanchana |
| Kumari Penn | T. R. Ramanna | Vinayaka Pictures | M. S. Viswanathan | Ravichandran, Jayalalitha, Nagesh |
| Lorry Driver | G. Vishwanathan | Maheswari Productions | S. P. Kodandapani | C. L. Anandan, Rajasree, Sheela, Nagesh |
| Madras to Pondicherry | Thirumalai–Mahalingam | Sunbeam Productions | T. K. Ramamoorthy | Nagesh, Ravichandran, A. Karunanidhi |
| Mahakavi Kalidas | R. R. Chandran | Kalpana Kalamandhir | K. V. Mahadevan | Sivaji Ganesan, Sowcar Janaki, R. S. Manohar |
| Major Chandrakanth | K. Balachander | A. V. M. Productions | V. Kumar | Major Sundarrajan, Nagesh, Jayalalitha, A. V. M. Rajan, R. Muthuraman |
| Mani Magudam | S. S. Rajendran | S. S. R.Pictures | R. Sudarsanam | S. S. Rajendran, C. R. Vijayakumari, Jayalalitha |
| Marakka Mudiyuma? | Murasoli Maran | Mekala Pictures | T. K. Ramamoorthy | S. S. Rajendran, Muthuraman, Devika, Kanchana, S. V. Sahasranamam, Cho |
| Motor Sundaram Pillai | Balu | Gemini Pictures | M. S. Viswanathan | Sivaji Ganesan, Sowcar Janaki, Ravichandran, Jayalalitha, Sivakumar, Kanchana |
| Muharasi | M. A. Thirumugam | Devar Films | K. V. Mahadevan | M. G. Ramachandran, Gemini Ganesan, Jayalalitha |
| Naam Moovar | Jambulingam | Balan Pictures | S. M. Subbaiah Naidu | Jaishankar, Ravichandran, L. Vijayalakshmi, Nagesh |
| Naan Aanaiyittal | Chanakya | Satya Movies | M. S. Viswanathan | M. G. Ramachandran, B. Saroja Devi, M. N. NambiarNagesh, K. R. Vijaya |
| Nadodi | B.R. Panthulu | Padmini Pictures | M. S. Viswanathan | M. G. Ramachandran, B. Saroja Devi, Bharathi, Nagesh |
| Namma Veettu Lakshmi | B. R. Panthulu | Padmini Pictures | M. S. Viswanathan | A. V. M. Rajan, B. R. Panthulu, Bharathi, Vanisri, M. V. Rajamma, Nagesh, Muthuraman |
| Panchali Sabatham; Dubbed from Hindi | Babubhai Mistri | Ramanand Combines | Chitragupta; D. Srinivas | Abhi Bhattacharya, Pradeep Kumar, Dara Singh, Padmini, Jeevan |
| Parakkum Pavai | T. R. Ramanna | R. R. Pictures | M. S. Viswanathan | M. G. Ramachandran, B. Saroja Devi, M. N. Nambiar, Kanchana, |
| Periya Manidhan | K. C. Krishnamoorthy | Saraswathi Pictures | S. V. Venkatraman | T. K. Ramachandran, Udaya Chandrika |
| Petralthan Pillaiya | Krishnan–Panju | Muthukumaran Pictures | M. S. Viswanathan | M. G. Ramachandran, B. Saroja Devi, K. A. Thangavelu, Sowcar Janaki |
| Ramu | A. C. Tirulokchandar | A. V. M. Productions | M. S. Viswanathan | Gemini Ganesan, K. R. Vijaya, Master Rajkumar |
| Sadhu Mirandal | A. Bhim Singh | Sunbeam Productions | T. K. Ramamoorthy | T. R. Ramachandran, O. A. K. Thevar, Nagesh |
| Saraswathi Sabatham | A. P. Nagarajan | Sri Vijayalakshmi Pictures | K. V. Mahadevan | Sivaji Ganesan, Padmini, Savitri, Gemini Ganesan |
| Selvam | K. S. Gopalakrishnan | V. K. R Pictures | K. V. Mahadevan | Sivaji Ganesan, K. R. Vijaya, S. V. Ranga Rao |
| Thaali Bhagyam | K. P. Nagabhooshnam | K. B. Nagabhooshnam | K. V. Mahadevan | M. G. Ramachandran, B. Saroja Devi, Nagesh |
| Thanippiravi | M. A. Thirumugam | Devar Films | K. V. Mahadevan | M. G. Ramachandran, Jayalalitha, Nagesh, C. L. Anandan |
| Thattungal Thirakkappadum | J. P. Chandrababu | Viswabharathy Pictures | M. S. Viswanathan | Chandrababu, K. R. Vijaya, R. S. Manohar, Savitri |
| Thaaye Unakkaga | P. Pullaiah | Sri Kamalanayanam | K. V. Mahadevan | Sivaji Ganesan, Padmini, Jayalalitha, S. S. Rajendran, C. R. Vijayakumari, Nagesh, Sivakumar |
| Thayin Mel Aanai | G. R. Nathan | Madras Cine Lab | T. G. Lingappa | C. L. Anandan, K. R. Vijaya, Rajasree, Nagesh, Manorama, B. V. Radha |
| Thedi Vandha Thirumagal | Sathyam | Sri Vijayagopal Pictures | K. V. Mahadevan | S. S. Rajendran, C. R. Vijayakumari, Ravichandran, S. V. Ranga Rao, Nagesh, Kanchana, V. K. Ramasamy |
| Thenmazhai | V. Srinivasan | Muktha Films | T. K. Ramamoorthy | Gemini Ganesan, K. R. Vijaya, Cho |
| Vallavan Oruvan | R. Sundaram | Modern Theaters | Vedha | Jaishankar, L. Vijayalakshmi, R. S. Manohar |
| Yaar Nee? | Satyam | P. S. V Pictures | Vedha | Jaishankar, JayalalithaP. S. Veerappa, C.L.Anandan. |
| Yaarukkaga Azhudhaan | Jayakanthan | Asia Jothi Films | S. V. Ramanan | Nagesh, K. R. Vijaya |
