= List of Tamil films of 1968 =

Post-amendment to the Tamil Nadu Entertainments Tax Act 1939 on 1 April 1958, Gross jumped to 140 per cent of Nett Commercial Taxes Department reported ₹7.57 crore in entertainment tax revenue for the year.

The following is a list of films produced in the Tamil film industry in India in 1968, in alphabetical order.

== 1968 ==
Title	Director	Production	Music	Cast
Anbu Vazhi	M. Natesan	Pavithra Pictures	M. S. Viswanathan	Jaishankar, L. Vijayalakshmi, Nagesh, O. A. K. Devar, Madhavi, Sundari Bai
Andru Kanda Mugam	G. Ramakrishnan	New India Productions	K. V. Mahadevan	Ravichandran, Jayalalitha, Nagesh
Bommalattam	V. Srinivasan	Muktha Films	V. Kumar	Jaishankar, Jayalalitha, Nagesh, Cho
Chakkaram	A. Kasilingam	Annai Films	S. M. Subbaiah Naidu	Gemini Ganesan, A. V. M. Rajan, Vennira Aadai Nirmala
Deiveega Uravu	Sathyam	Thirumurugan Pictures	K. V. Mahadevan	Jaishankar, Devika, Nagesh, V. K. Ramasamy
Delhi Mapillai	Devan	Poomagal Productions	K. V. Mahadevan	Ravichandran, Rajasree, Cho, Sachu, V. K. Ramasamy, Manorama
Devi	A. K. Velan	Arunachalam Pictures	V. Dakshinamoorthy	R. Muthuraman, Devika
Edhir Neechal	K. Balachander	Kalakendra Productions	V. Kumar	Nagesh, R. Muthuraman, Sowcar Janaki, Jayanthi, Srikanth
En Thambi	A. C. Tirulokchandar	Sujatha Cine Arts	M. S. Viswanathan	Sivaji Ganesan, B. Saroja Devi, K. Balaji, Nagesh
Enga Oor Raja	P. Madhavan	Arun Prasad Movies	M. S. Viswanathan	Sivaji Ganesan, Jayalalitha, Sowcar Janaki, Nagesh, Manorama
Galatta Kalyanam	C. V. Rajendran	Ramkumar Films	M. S. Viswanathan	Sivaji Ganesan, Jayalalitha, K. A. Thangavelu, Nagesh, Cho, Manorama, Sachu, A. V. M. Rajan, Jyothi Lakshmi
Harichandra	K. S. Prakash Rao	Pramodha Films	K. V. Mahadevan	Sivaji Ganesan, G. Varalakshmi, T. S. Balaiah, M. N. Nambiar
Jeevanamsam	Malliyam Rajagopal	Malliyam Productions	K. V. Mahadevan	Jaishankar, C. R. Vijayakumari, A. V. M. Rajan, Pushpalatha, Nagesh, Sowcar Janaki
Kallum Kaniyagum	K. Shankar	Sounder Ragavan Movies	M. S. Viswanathan	T. M. Soundararajan, A. L. Raghavan, Nagesh, Rajasree, M. N. Rajam, Sachu
Kanavan	P. Neelakantan	Valli Films	M. S. Viswanathan	M. G. Ramachandran, Jayalalitha, C. R. Vijayakumari, Cho
Kannan En Kadhalan	P. Neelakantan	Sathya Movies	M. S. Viswanathan	M. G. Ramachandran, Jayalalitha, Vanisri, Muthuraman, Cho, Asogan, Thengai Seenivasan
Kadhal Vaaganam	M. A. Thirumugam	Devar Films	K. V. Mahadevan	M. G. Ramachandran, Jayalalitha, Vijaya Lalitha, Nagesh
Kollaikaran Magan; Dubbed from Kannada	A. V. Sheshagiri Rao	Bhagavati Productions	T. G. Lingappa	Rajkumar, K. S. Ashwath, Jayanthi, M. P. Shankar, Udaykumar
Kudiyirundha Koyil	K. Shankar	Saravana Screens	M. S. Viswanathan	M. G. Ramachandran, Jayalalitha, Rajasree, Nagesh, Nambiar
Kuzhanthaikkaga	P. Madhavan	Vijaya & Suresh Combines	M. S. Viswanathan	Padmini, 'Baby' Rani, Major Sundarrajan, R. S. Manohar, S. V. Ramadoss
Lakshmi Kalyanam	G. Or. Nathan	Krishnalaya Productions	M. S. Viswanathan	Sivaji Ganesan, Sowcar Janaki, Vennira Aadai Nirmala, Balaji, Cho
Moondrezhuthu	T. R. Ramanna	Sri Vinayaka Pictures	T. K. Ramamoorthy	Ravichandran, Jayalalitha, NageshAsogan, Sundarrajan, Thengai Seenivasan
Muthu Chippi	M. Krishnan	Mohan Productions	S. M. Subbaiah Naidu	Jaishankar, Jayalalitha, Nagesh
Naalum Therindhavan	C. P. Jambulingam	Sri Balaji Combines	S. M. Subbaiah Naidu	Ravichandran, Kanchana, Anjali Devi, Nagesh
Neelagiri Express	Thirumalai–Mahalingam	A.L.S. Productions	T. K. Ramamoorthy	Jaishankar, Vijaya Nirmala, Cho, Vijaya Lalitha
Neeyum Naanum	T. R. Ramanna	Iris Movies	M. S. Viswanathan	Ravichandran, Rajasree, Nagesh, Asogan, Manohar
Nervazhi	M. G. Balu Rao	Dhandayuthapani Films	R. Diwakar	Jaishankar, Vanisri, R. S. Manohar, Vijaya Lalitha, Sundarrajan, Nagesh,
Nimirndhu Nil	Devan	Kamal Brothers	M. S. Viswanathan	Ravichandran, Bharathi, Sowcar Janaki, V. K. Ramasamy, J. P. Chandrababu, B. V. Radha
Oli Vilakku	Tapi Chanakya	Gemini Studios	M. S. Viswanathan	M. G. Ramachandran, Jayalalitha, Sowcar JanakiCho, Asogan
Paal Manam	K. S. Sethumadhavan	Sri Nataraja Productions	R Parthasarathy	Jaishankar, K. R. Vijaya, Manimala, Nagesh, Major Sundararajan, Asogan
Panakkara Pillai	C. P. Jambulingam	Annai Films	S. M. Subbaiah Naidu	Ravichandran, Jayalalitha, Nagesh, Nambiar, Jhotylakshmi, M.R.R.Vasu
Panama Pasama	K. S. Gopalakrishnan	Ravi Productions	K. V. Mahadevan	Gemini Ganesan, B. Saroja Devi, Nagesh
Poovum Pottum	Dada Mirasi	Vasu Films	R. Govardhanam	S. V. Ranga Rao, P. Bhanumathi, A. V. M. Rajan, R. Muthuraman, Bharathi
Puthiya Bhoomi	Tapi Chanakya	J. R. Movies	M. S. Viswanathan	M. G. Ramachandran, Jayalalitha, Sheela, Nagesh, Nambiar,
Puthisaligal	Arun	N. A. L. Productions	V. Kumar	Jaishankar, M. A. Radhika, Thengai Srinivasan, Manorama, A. Karunanidhi, T. P. Muthulakshmi, Sachu, Pakoda Kadhar
Ragasiya Police 115	B. R. Panthulu	Padmini Pictures	M. S. Viswanathan	M. G. Ramachandran, Jayalalitha, Vennira Aadai Nirmala, M. N. Nambiar
Sathiyam Thavaradhey	Pondy Selvaraj	Ammal Films	C. N. Pandurangan	Ravichandran, Vijaya Nirmala, Nagesh, Asogan, Sheela M.R.R.Vasu
Selviyin Selvan	Mohan Gandhiram	S. R. K. Productions	Pukazhenthi	Ravichandran, Chandrakantha, C. R. Vijayakumari
Siritha Mugam	V. V. Raman	Navasakthi Productions	Shankar–Ganesh	Gemini Ganesan, Jaishankar, Rajasree, Vijaya Nirmala, Balaiah, Cho
Soappu Seeppu Kannadi	Thirumalai–Mahalingam	Karthikeya Films	T. K. Ramamoorthy	Nagesh, Vijaya NirmalaSagasranamam, Usilaimani
Teacheramma	S. R. Puttanna	Subalakshmi Pictures	T. R. Pappa	Jaishankar, R. Muthuraman, C. R. Vijayakumari, Vanisri
Thamarai Nenjam	K. Balachander	Bama Films	M. S. Viswanathan	Gemini Ganesan, B. Saroja Devi, Vanisri
Thanga Valayal	M. A. V. Rajendran	Salem Movies	K. V. Mahadevan	Jaishankar, K. R. Vijaya, V. Meera Devi, K. A. Thangavelu, Manorama
Ther Thiruvizha	M. A. Thirumugam	Devar Films	K. V. Mahadevan	M. G. Ramachandran, Jayalalitha, C. R. Vijayakumari, R. MuthuramanNagesh, Manorama
Thillana Mohanambal	A. P. Nagarajan	Sri Vijayalakshmi Pictures	K. V. Mahadevan	Sivaji Ganesan, Padmini, A. V. M. Rajan, Nagesh
Thirumal Perumai	A. P. Nagarajan	Thiru Venkateswara Movies	K. V. Mahadevan	Sivaji Ganesan, Padmini, K. R. Vijaya, Sowcar Janaki
Uyarndha Manithan	Krishnan–Panju	AVM Productions	M. S. Viswanathan	Sivaji Ganesan, Sowcar Janaki, Vanisri, Sivakumar, Bharathi
Uyira Maanama	K. S. Gopalakrishnan	Amar Jothi Movies	M. S. Viswanathan	Jaishankar, Vijaya Nirmala, R. Muthuraman, Krishna Kumari
