= Poruthathu Pothum =

- Poster
- Directed by: P. Kalaimani
- Screenplay by: M. Karunanidhi
- Story by: P. Kalaimani
- Produced by: Pala. Karuppiah
- Starring: Vijayakanth; Nirosha; Ranjini
- Cinematography: B. R. Vijayalakshmi
- Edited by: B. Lenin; V. T. Vijayan
- Music by: Ilaiyaraaja
- Production company: Kamala Chithram
- Release date: 15 July 1989
- Country: India
- Language: Tamil

Poruthathu Pothum (transl. Enough is enough) is a 1989 Indian Tamil-language action film directed by P. Kalaimani. The film stars Vijayakanth, Nirosha and Ranjini, with Jaishankar, Ravichandran, S. S. Chandran, Vennira Aadai Moorthy and Major Sundarrajan in supporting roles. It was released on 15 July 1989.

== Cast ==
- Vijayakanth in a dual role as
  - Nallarasu (Vallarasu)
  - Ponnuthangam
- Nirosha as Thilaka
- Ranjini as Rosy
- Jaishankar as Inspector David
- Ravichandran as Azhala Sundaram
- S. S. Chandran as Devadas
- Vennira Aadai Moorthy
- Major Sundarrajan as Police commissioner
- Malaysia Vasudevan as Mohan Raj
- Ra. Sankaran
- S. N. Vasanth as Suresh
- Srividya as Punithavadi
- Kamala Kamesh
- C. I. D. Sakunthala
- Ennathe Kannaiah as Prisoner
- I. S. R.
- Karuppu Subbiah
- LIC Narasimhan as Advocate

== Soundtrack ==
The music was composed by Ilaiyaraaja.

Track listing
No.	Title	Lyrics	Singer(s)	Length
1.	"Aararo Paada"	Vaali	Ilaiyaraaja	4:29
2.	"Aararo Paada"	Vaali	P. Susheela	4:35
3.	"Adi Raanimangamma"	Vaali	Mano	4:32
4.	"Raaththiri Thookkam"	Vaali	S. P. Balasubrahmanyam, K. S. Chithra	4:37
5.	"Veppamaram"	Valampuri John	Malaysia Vasudevan	4:33
Total length:				22:46

== Reception ==
P. S. S. of Kalki wrote that despite the many loopholes, the flow of the film can be appreciated; when the interval comes, however, it seems like so soon.
