= Naanum Indha Ooruthan =

- Title card
- Directed by: Shegar Raja
- Written by: T. Durairaj (dialogues)
- Screenplay by: Shegar Raja
- Story by: Jaya Rajendran
- Produced by: Florida Fernando
- Starring: Murali; Khushbu; Ravichandran; Nagaraja Cholan
- Cinematography: S. A. N. Gopi
- Edited by: Ganesh Kumar
- Music by: Shankar–Ganesh
- Production company: Sudalya Productions
- Release date: 13 July 1990
- Running time: 130 minutes
- Country: India
- Language: Tamil

Naanum Indha Ooruthan (transl. I Am Also From This Town) is a 1990 Indian Tamil-language film directed by Shegar Raja and produced by Florida Fernando. The film stars Murali, Khushbu, Ravichandran and Nagaraja Cholan. It was released on 13 July 1990.

== Cast ==
- Murali as Muthu
- Lakshmi as Sevvanthi's mother
- Khushbu as Sevvanthi
- Ravichandran
- Nagaraja Cholan
- Sulakshana
- Rajeev in Friendly Appearance
- V. Gopalakrishnan
- Samikannu
- Chinni Jayanth
- Pasi Narayanan
- Trichy Murugan
- Sabaskar
- Master Vijay
- Sabaana
- Y. Vijaya
- Mohanapriya
- Jayanthi
- Periya Karuppu Thevar
- Sithan
- Joseph Raja
- Azhagu Nambi
- Naadaar

== Soundtrack ==
The music was composed by Shankar–Ganesh. The song "Ponnusirikidu Poovatama" marked the debut of lyricist Parinamam.

Song	Singers		Length
"Ponnusirikidu Poovatama"	Mano, K. S. Chithra	Parinamam	4:07
"Odakaran Pattu"	Mano	Vaali	2:56
"Kayya Thooki"	S. P. Sailaja	Vaali	0:41
"Ooruperu Poonjoladhan"	Malaysia Vasudevan	Vaali	4:19
"Naankooda Inda Ooru Aaludhan"	Malaysia Vasudevan	Vaali	5:20
"Vaasal"	Mano, K. S. Chithra	Vaali	4:19
