= Vimochanasamaram =

- Directed by: Mohan Gandhiraman
- Written by: C. G. Gopinath
- Screenplay by: C. G. Gopinath
- Starring: Sathyan; Sheela; Maya; T. R. Omana
- Cinematography: P. B. Mani
- Music by: M. B. Sreenivasan
- Production company: Chithrakalalayam
- Distributed by: Chithrakalalayam
- Release date: 13 August 1971
- Country: India
- Language: Malayalam

Vimochanasamaram (transl. Liberation Struggle) is a 1971 Indian Malayalam film, directed by Mohan Gandhiraman. The film stars Sathyan, Sheela, Maya and T. R. Omana in the lead roles. The film had musical score by M. B. Sreenivasan.

== Cast ==
- Sathyan
- Sheela
- Maya
- T. R. Omana
- Bahadoor
- G. K. Pillai
- Kaduvakulam Antony
- N. Govindankutty
- Ravichandran
- T. K. Balachandran

== Soundtrack ==
The music was composed by M. B. Sreenivasan and the lyrics were written by P. Bhaskaran, Vayalar Ramavarma, P. N. Dev and Mankombu Gopalakrishnan.

No.	Song	Singers	Lyrics	Length (m:ss)
1	"Amritha Kiranan"	K. J. Yesudas, S. Janaki	P. Bhaskaran	
2	"Ee Nalla Nattilellam"	P. B. Sreenivas	Vayalar Ramavarma	
3	"Kaattilirunnu Virunnu Vilikkum"	S. Janaki	Vayalar Ramavarma	
4	"Neelanilaavin Paalkkadalil"	S. Janaki, Rangarajan	P. N. Dev	
5	"Prapancha Hridaya"	S. Janaki, P. Leela	Mankombu Gopalakrishnan	
6	"Samaram Vimochanasamaram"	K. J. Yesudas	Vayalar Ramavarma	
