= Rathna (actress) =

Indian actress (born 1948)

G. Naga Rathna
- Born: Rathna (Prasanna Lakshmi); 19 January 1948
- Died: 2002
- Other name: Prasanna Lakshmi
- Occupation: Actress
- Years active: 1961-1980
- Spouse: Sheikh Umar
- Relatives: G. Varalakshmi (aunt)

Rathna (Prasanna Lakshmi) was an Indian actress who predominantly worked in Tamil, Malayalam, Telugu and Kannada film industries.

== Personal life ==
Rathna was the niece of actress G. Varalakshmi.

== Film career ==
Rathna made her debut in Tamil movie Thozhilali (1964) when she was 15 years old. She gained recognition for her role in Enga Veettu Pillai (1965) where she acted as a village girl. A popular duet song, Naan Maanthoppil, set in folk melody with M. G. Ramachandran in that movie elevated her role as the second lead heroine.

== Filmography ==
This list is incomplete; you can help by expanding it.

Year	Title	Role	Language	Notes
1961	Thirudathe	Uncredited Role	Tamil	
1962	Mahaveera Bheeman		Tamil	
1962	Gulebakavali Katha		Telugu	credited as Nagarathna
1963	Anubandhalu		Telugu	
1963	Gowri		Kannada	
1964	Thozhilali	Vijaya	Tamil	
1965	Enga Veettu Pillai	Santha	Tamil	
1966	Naam Moovar		Tamil	
1966	Sri Krishna Pandaveeyam	Hidimbi	Telugu	
1966	Monagallaku Monagadu	Mala	Telugu	
1966	Bhoolokamlo Yamalokam		Telugu	
1967	Sabash Thambi	Rathna	Tamil	
1967	Chand Par Chadayee		Hindi	
1968	Veeranjaneya		Telugu	
1968	Moogajeevulu		Telugu	
1970	Paropakari		Kannada	
1970	Bhoopathi Ranga		Kannada	
1972	Yaava Janmada Maitri		Kannada	
1972	Thriveni		Kannada	
1972	Subhadra Kalyana		Kannada	
1973	Dhanama? Daivama?		Telugu	
1973	Vaade Veedu		Telugu	
1974	Gundelu Teesina Monagadu		Telugu	
1974	Manushullo Devudu		Telugu	
1975	Idhayakkani	Kamala	Tamil	
1975	Panam Pathum Seyum		Tamil	
1975	Thennangkeetru		Tamil	
1975	Samsaram		Telugu	
1979	Swami Drohulu		Telugu	
1980	Swamiji		Kannada	
1982	Hasyaratna Ramakrishna		Kannada	
