= Jeevanadi =

1970 film directed by A. K. Subramanian

- Theatrical release poster
- Directed by: A. K. Subramanian
- Written by: K. S. Gopalakrishnan
- Produced by: T. S. Mahadevan
- Starring: Ravichandran; Lakshmi
- Cinematography: Krishnan Kutti
- Edited by: R. Devarajan
- Music by: V. Dakshinamoorthy
- Production company: Vinayaka Films
- Release date: 14 January 1970
- Country: India
- Language: Tamil

Jeevanadi (/dʒiːvənɑːdi/ transl. Pulse) is a 1970 Indian Tamil-language musical film directed by A. K. Subramanian and written by K. S. Gopalakrishnan. The film stars Ravichandran and Lakshmi. It was released on 14 January 1970.

== Cast ==
- Ravichandran
- Lakshmi
- M. N. Nambiar
- Major Sundarrajan
- K. A. Thangavelu
- Vijayasri
- G. Sakunthala
- M. Saroja
- M. R. R. Vasu
- Kaka Radhakrishnan
- R. Balasubramaniam
- Loose Arumugam

== Soundtrack ==
The soundtrack was composed by V. Dakshinamoorthy. The song "Aruvi Magal" is set in the Carnatic raga known as Saranga. S. Shivpprasadh of The Hindu wrote that Jeevanadi was one of Dakshinamoorthy's films that "had melody as their strength."

Track listing
No.	Title	Singer(s)	Length
1.	"Aruvi Magal"	K. J. Yesudas, Soolamangalam Jayalakshmi	3:26
2.	"Ayothi Aranmanai"	P. Susheela	4:23
3.	"Niruthi Paar"	L. R. Eswari	4:19
4.	"Saptham Seiyadhe"	L. R. Eswari	4:29
Total length:			16:37
