= Avalukku Aayiram Kangal =

1975 film

- Directed by: T. R. Ramanna
- Written by: Mahendran
- Starring: Jaishankar; Ravichandran; Jayalalithaa; P. R. Varalakshmi
- Music by: T. K. Ramamoorthy
- Release date: 28 November 1975
- Country: India
- Language: Tamil

Avalukku Aayiram Kangal (transl. She Has a Thousand Eyes) is a 1975 Indian Tamil language directed by T. R. Ramanna, starring Jaishankar, Ravichandran and Jayalalithaa. It is noted for being the last film in which Jayalalithaa shared screen-pace with both the heroes, who were regularly paired opposite her since 1966. The film was released on 28 November 1975.

== Cast ==
- Jaishankar
- Ravichandran
- Jayalalithaa
- P. R. Varalakshmi
- M. R. R. Vasu
- Cho

== Production ==
One of the songs was shot at Poondi reservoir. Filming there was temporarily stopped as Jayalalithaa was asked to act in water but did not have another set of clothes.

== Soundtrack ==
The music was composed by T. K. Ramamoorthy.

Track listing
No.	Title	Length
1.	"Pathutharam"
2.	"Thangam Naan"
3.	"Ore Aayiram"
