= Sakthi (1972 film) =

- Directed by: Crossbelt Mani
- Produced by: B.S. Ranga
- Starring: Sheela; Ravichandran; Thikkurissy Sukumaran Nair; Adoor Bhasi
- Music by: V. Dakshinamoorthy
- Release date: 22 December 1972
- Country: India
- Language: Malayalam

Sakthi is a 1972 Indian Malayalam-language film, directed by Crossbelt Mani. The film stars Sheela, Ravichandran, Thikkurissy Sukumaran Nair and Adoor Bhasi. The film had musical score by V. Dakshinamoorthy.

== Cast ==
- Sheela
- Ravichandran
- Thikkurissy Sukumaran Nair
- Adoor Bhasi
- N. Govindankutty
- T. K. Balachandran
- Paravoor Bharathan
- Jose Prakash
- Paul Vengola
- C. A. Balan
- Philomina
- Sreelatha
- Jayan

== Soundtrack ==
The music was composed by V. Dakshinamoorthy and the lyrics were written by Vayalar Ramavarma.

No.	Song	Singers	Lyrics	Length (m:ss)
1	"Kuliro Kuliro"	S. Janaki	Vayalar Ramavarma	
2	"Maanyanmare Mahathikale"	Adoor Bhasi	Vayalar Ramavarma	
3	"Mizhiyo Mazhavilkkodiyo"	K. J. Yesudas	Vayalar Ramavarma	
4	"Neelaraanyame"	K. J. Yesudas	Vayalar Ramavarma	
5	"Pookkalenikkishtamaanu"	P. Susheela	Vayalar Ramavarma	
