= Valiba Virundhu =

- Poster
- Directed by: Murasoli Maran
- Written by: M. Karunanidhi
- Produced by: Murasoli Maran
- Starring: Ravichandran; Bharathi
- Cinematography: Amirdam
- Edited by: R. Devarajan
- Music by: Sudarsanam
- Production company: Mekala Pictures
- Release date: 2 June 1967
- Running time: 180 minutes
- Country: India
- Language: Tamil

Valiba Virundhu (transl. Youth Party) is a 1967 Indian Tamil-language film directed by Murasoli Maran and written by M. Karunanidhi. The film stars Ravichandran and Bharathi. It was released on 2 June 1967.

== Plot ==
An unemployed youth called Ravi and a vivacious girl called Radha are neighbors who fight frequently on trivial matters. Radha's wealthy father Rajasekaran wants to donate some of his properties for charity. This is objected to by his nephew Moorthy who intends to marry Radha and seize all the properties. When Rajasekaran threatens to expel Moorthy, the latter abducts Rajasekaran and replaces him with a doppelgänger. With the help of the doppelgänger, Moorthy tries to marry Bharati, who is oblivious to the fact that her father has been abducted. However, Ravi successfully exposes Moorthy, rescues the real Rajasekaran and marries Bharati.

== Cast ==
- Ravichandran as Ravi
- Bharathi as Radha
- J. P. Chandrababu as Babu
- T. S. Balaiah as Rajasekaran
- S. A. Ashokan as Moorthy
- Suruli Rajan as Publisher
- Usilai Mani as Appu Iyer
- Vijayrani
- Radhi Devi

== Production ==
Valiba Virundhu was produced and directed by Murasoli Maran under the banner Mekala Pictures. M. Karunanidhi wrote the story and screenplay. Cinematography was by Amirdham, and the art direction was handled by Nagarajan. Editing was by R. Devarajan, and choreography by the duo Chinni-Sampath while the music was composed by Sudarsanam. The final length of the film was 3,999 metres (13,120 feet).

== Reception ==
Kalki praised Maran's direction and called the film entertaining.

== Bibliography ==
- Cowie, Peter; Elley, Derek, eds. (1977). World Filmography: 1967. Fairleigh Dickinson University Press. ISBN 0-498-01565-3.
- Rathinagiri, R. (2007). Time capsule of Kalaignar. Dravida Munnetra Kazhagam. OCLC 233030854.
