= Andru Kanda Mugam =

- Poster
- Directed by: G. Ramakrishnan
- Story by: G. Ramakrishnan
- Produced by: G. Ramakrishnan
- Starring: Ravichandran; Jayalalithaa
- Cinematography: M. Karnan
- Edited by: E. V. Shanmugam
- Music by: K. V. Mahadevan
- Production company: New India Productions
- Release date: 15 January 1968
- Running time: 170 minutes
- Country: India
- Language: Tamil

Andru Kanda Mugam (transl. The Face I Saw That Day) is a 1968 Indian Tamil-language thriller film, written, directed and produced by G. Ramakrishnan. Music was by K. V. Mahadevan. The film stars Ravichandran and Jayalalithaa, with S. A. Ashokan, Nagesh, Manorama, V. K. Ramasamy and Major Sundarrajan in supporting roles. It was released on 15 January 1968.

== Cast ==
- Ravichandran as Rajendran
- Jayalalithaa as Kanchana
- S. A. Ashokan as Advocate Aathmanathan
- Nagesh as Subbusami
- Manorama as Devi
- V. K. Ramasamy as Somasundaram
- Major Sundarrajan as Selvanayagam
- C. R. Parthiban
- Suruli Rajan as Head Constable
- Gemini Balu as Prabhakaran
- S. Rama Rao as Neelakanta Sasthri
- Usilai Mani as Kanchana's paternal uncle
- S. Paravathi as Kanchana's aunt
- K. R. Indira Devi
- Justin
- Viswanathan

== Soundtrack ==
Music was composed by K. V. Mahadevan and lyrics were written by Kannadasan.

Songs	Singers	Length
"Idhayam Pollathathu"	P. Susheela	04:44
"Kann Padaithaan"	T. M. Soundararajan, P. Susheela	04:12
"Vaadaa Machchan Vaa"	T. M. Soundararajan, A. L. Raghavan	03:32
"Vazhakkondru Thoduppen"	T. M. Soundararajan, P. Susheela	03:05
"Aarumuga Samy Vandhu"	T. M. Soundararajan	03:28

== Reception ==
Kalki said that though so many things were running, the film itself was not.
