= Naalum Therindhavan =

- Poster
- Directed by: Jambu
- Written by: Guhanathan
- Produced by: C. P. Jambulingam; K. V. Kamalanabham; K. T. S. Karuppiah
- Starring: Ravichandran; Kanchana
- Cinematography: M. Karnan
- Edited by: C. P. Jambulingam; C. P. S. Mani
- Music by: S. M. Subbaiah Naidu
- Production company: Sri Balaji Combines
- Release date: 12 December 1968
- Country: India
- Language: Tamil

Naalum Therindhavan (transl. The know-all) is a 1968 Indian Tamil-language comedy film co-produced, co-edited and directed by C. P. Jambulingam and written by Guhanathan. The film stars Ravichandran and Kanchana. It was released on 12 December 1968.

== Cast ==
- Ravichandran
- Kanchana
- Nagesh
- R. S. Manohar
- V. K. Ramasamy
- S. A. Ashokan
- M. R. R. Vasu
- Anjali Devi
- Pandari Bai
- Renu
- Vijaysri

== Production ==
Naalum Therindhavan was directed by C. P. Jambulingam using the diminutive "Jambu". He co-produced the film with K. V. Kamalanabham and K. T. S. Karuppiah under Sri Balaji Combines, and co-edited it with C. P. S. Mani, while Guhanathan wrote the script.

== Soundtrack ==
The soundtrack was composed by S. M. Subbaiah Naidu.

Track listing
No.	Title	Lyrics	Singer(s)	Length
1.	"Chella Mama"	Poovai Senguttuvan	T. M. Soundararajan, S. V. Ponnusami
2.	"Nari Ondru"	Kannadasan	T. M. Soundararajan
3.	"Nilavukke Pogalam"	Poovai Senguttuvan	T. M. Soundararajan, P. Susheela
4.	"Poovaa Poovaa"	Kannadasan	T. M. Soundararajan, P. Susheela
5.	"Sikkendru Otti Konda"	Vaali	T. M. Soundararajan

== Release and reception ==
Naalum Therindhavan was released on 12 December 1968. The Indian Express wrote, "There is a sequence and an important one that takes place in complete darkness. All one can hear is the noise of characters running about and stumbling over things. Spectators are puzzled as to what is happening on the screen during these minutes. And they are equally puzzled at what is shown in sparkling brightness for they can't make head or tail out of this mumbo-jumbo (or Jambu-he is the director), running to 16 reels."
