= Thanga Thambi =

1967 film by Ramnath-Francis

- Theatrical release poster
- Directed by: Ramnath–Francis
- Written by: M. Karunanidhi
- Produced by: R.Periyanayagam; S. P. Karuppiah Pillai
- Starring: Ravichandran; Bharathi; Vanisri; Major Sundarrajan
- Cinematography: Sundara Babu
- Edited by: R. Devarajan
- Music by: K. V. Mahadevan
- Production company: Umayal Productions
- Distributed by: Jayalakshmi Pictures Circuit
- Release date: 26 January 1967
- Running time: 139–175 minutes (Note: While Encyclopedia of Indian Cinema says it was 139 minutes long, World Filmography: 1967 by Peter Cowie and Derek Elley goes with 175 minutes.)
- Country: India
- Language: Tamil

Thanga Thambi (transl. Golden Brother) is a 1967 Indian Tamil-language film directed by Ramnath–Francis and written by M. Karunanidhi. The film stars Ravichandran, Bharathi, Vanisri and Major Sundarrajan. It was released on 26 January 1967.

== Cast ==
- Ravichandran as Venu/Venugopal
- Bharathi as Saraswathi/Sarasu
- Vanisri as Sundari
- Major Sundarrajan as Varathan

Other supporting roles are played by Nagesh, Manorama, O. A. K. Thevar and En Thangai Natarajan.

== Production ==
Thanga Thambi was directed by Ramnath–Francis and written by M. Karunanidhi. R.Periyanayagam and S. P. Karuppaiah Pillai produced the film under Umayal Productions. Cinematography was handled by Sundara Babu, art direction by Angamuthu and the editing by R. Devarajan.

== Music ==
The music of the film was composed by K. V. Mahadevan. The lyrics were written by Vaali and Avinasi Mani.

== Release and reception ==
Thanga Thambi was released on 26 January 1967, and was distributed by Jayalakshmi Pictures Circuit. Kalki said the film stumbled in the beginning, but post interval it did better.

== Bibliography ==
- Cowie, Peter; Elley, Derek (1977). World Filmography: 1967. Fairleigh Dickinson University Press. ISBN 978-0-498-01565-6.
- Rajadhyaksha, Ashish; Willemen, Paul (1998) [1994]. Encyclopaedia of Indian Cinema. British Film Institute and Oxford University Press. ISBN 0-19-563579-5.
