= Baghdad Perazhagi =

- Poster
- Directed by: T. R. Ramanna
- Story by: Ravindar
- Produced by: Ganesh Ramanna
- Starring: Jayalalithaa; Ravichandran
- Cinematography: M. A. Rahman
- Edited by: T. R. Srinivasalu
- Music by: M. S. Viswanathan
- Production company: Ganesh Creations
- Release date: 25 October 1973
- Running time: 164 minutes
- Country: India
- Language: Tamil
- Budget: ₹30 lakh

Baghdad Perazhagi (transl. The Most Beautiful Woman of Baghdad) is a 1973 Indian Tamil-language historical drama film directed by T. R. Ramanna. It starred Jayalalitha in the lead role opposite Ravichandran while Jayasudha, Savitri and Shubha play supporting roles. It was released on 25 October 1973 and emerged as a commercial success. A Hindi dubbed version, Shehzadi Mumtaz was released four years later (in 1977).

== Cast ==
- Jayalalithaa as Mumtaj
- Ravichandran as Prince Abdullah
- Savitri as Queen Khadija
- Major Sundarrajan as Sultan Syed Ali Hasan
- Nagesh as Kamar
- S. A. Ashokan as Raja Guru Sardar
- A. Sakunthala as Zubeida
- R. S. Manohar as Thalapathi Muras
- V. K. Ramasamy as Mama
- Thengai Srinivasan as Gulabi
- Sachu as Suraiyya
- Shubha as Princess Zeenat
- Jayasudha as Shakila
- Pushpamala
- Ennatha Kannaiya as Raja Guru Assistant
- Typist Gopu as Raja Guru Assistant
- Sarala
- Shanmugasundaram as Thalapathi Sikander
- Aalam as Dancer
- Pulorada as Dancer

== Production ==
The film was launched at Newtone Studios. The song "Naan Kudichu" was picturised on that day.

== Soundtrack ==
The music composed by M. S. Viswanathan, with lyrics by Pulamaipithan.

Song	Singers	Length
"Dance 1"	Instrumental	02:05
"Padi Padi"	L. R. Eswari, Saibaba	03:19
"Dance 2"	Instrumental	02:43
"Nawabukku Oru Kelvi"	S. P. Balasubrahmanyam, S. Janaki	06:36
"Naan Kuduchu"	S. Janaki, L. R. Eswari	04:36
"Naan Vecha Vecha Kuri"	T. M. Soundararajan	03:56
"Vanga Ungalathan Vanga"	L. R. Eswari	04:04
"Naadu Naadu"	S.Janaki	04:40

== Reception ==
Kanthan of Kalki praised the performances of cast, Rahman's cinematography, Ramanna's direction but panned Asokan's acting, too many songs testing patience and concluded this film will stand at the fore in the line-up of highly engaging entertainers.
