= Naangu Suvargal =

- Poster
- Directed by: K. Balachander
- Written by: K. Balachander
- Produced by: V. S. Sharma; P. S. Mani
- Starring: Jaishankar; Ravichandran; Vanisri
- Music by: M. S. Viswanathan
- Production company: Screen Entertainment
- Release date: 6 February 1971
- Country: India
- Language: Tamil

Naangu Suvargal (transl. Four Walls) is a 1971 Indian Tamil-language drama film written and directed by K. Balachander. The film stars Jaishankar, Ravichandran and Vanisri. It was released on 6 February 1971, and failed commercially.

== Plot ==
The lives of two burglars, Raja and Ravi, change when they meet Siva Prakasam, a rich man. However, they are forced to go their separate ways, following a rift in their relationship.

== Cast ==
- Jaishankar
- Ravichandran
- T. K. Bhagavathi as Sivaprakasam
- R. S. Manohar
- Nagesh
- O. A. K. Thevar
- V. S. Raghavan
- Vanisri
- Sowcar Janaki
- Vijaya Lalitha
- Srividya
- Master Prabhakar
- Master Athinarayanan

== Production ==
Naangu Suvargal was directed by K. Balachander who also wrote the story and dialogue. It was produced by V. S. Sharma and P. S. Mani under Screen Entertainment, and was Balachander's first colour venture, as well the second collaboration between Jaishankar and Ravichandran as actors. Srividya portrayed a visually impaired character for which she had to wear contact lenses.

== Soundtrack ==
The soundtrack was composed by M. S. Viswanathan, with lyrics by Kannadasan.

Track listing
No.	Title	Singer(s)	Length
1.	"Ninaithal Naan"	S. P. Balasubrahmanyam, P. Susheela
2.	"O Maina"	S. P. Balasubrahmanyam
3.	"Odi Vaavena"	S. P. Balasubrahmanyam, T. M. Soundararajan
4.	"O Maina"	T. M. Soundararajan
5.	"Naan Oru Paattu"	L. R. Eswari
6.	"Vaanam Bhoomi"	Sirkazhi Govindarajan

== Release and reception ==
Naangu Suvargal was released on 6 February 1971, and was a commercial failure. T. G. Vaidyanathan of Film World described it as a "re-do" of V. Shantaram's Do Aankhen Barah Haath (1957) as it dealt with rehabilitation of criminals.
