= Malathi (film) =

1970 film by K. S. Gopalakrishnan

- Poster
- Directed by: K. S. Gopalakrishnan
- Screenplay by: K. S. Gopalakrishnan
- Story by: Gomathi Subramaniyam
- Produced by: K. S. Gopalakrishnan
- Starring: Gemini Ganesan; B. Saroja Devi; Ravichandran
- Cinematography: K. S. Prasad
- Music by: M. S. Viswanathan
- Production company: Chitra Productions
- Release date: 29 October 1970
- Country: India
- Language: Tamil

Malathi (/mɑːləθi/) is a 1970 Indian Tamil-language drama film written, produced and directed by K. S. Gopalakrishnan. The film stars Gemini Ganesan, B. Saroja Devi and Ravichandran. It was released on 29 October 1970.

== Plot ==
Malathi, a young woman from a wealthy family, pursues MBBS in a medical college, where she meets Balu, a senior student. They fall in love, but due to her family's circumstances, they are unable to marry; Malathi ends up marrying Rajan, a relative, who is addicted to drinking and drugs. She decides to reform him, and the rest of the film deals with whether she succeeds in her endeavour or not.

== Cast ==
- Gemini Ganesan as Dr. Balu
- Ravichandran as Ananth
- B. Saroja Devi as Malathi
- Major Sundarrajan as Sundaresan
- S. Varalakshmi as Gowri
- V. Gopalakrishnan as Chandrasekaran
- K. Sarangapani as Marthandan
- Nagesh as Natraj
- Thengai Srinivasan as Vaithuvali Mama
- Ushanandini as Chandra
- Jayakumari as Devika
- Radhika

== Production ==
Malathi was produced and directed by K. S. Gopalakrishnan. The screenplay, written by him, was based on a story by Gomathi Subramaniam. Cinematography was handled by K. S. Prasad.

== Soundtrack ==
The soundtrack was composed by M. S. Viswanathan, who was assisted by Govardhanam and Joseph Krishna. The lyrics were written by Kannadasan.

Track listing
No.	Title	Singer(s)	Length
1.	"Chit Chit"	S. P. Balasubrahmanyam, P. Susheela
2.	"Karpanaiyo"	S. P. Balasubrahmanyam, P. Susheela
3.	"Enge En"	T. M. Soundararajan, L. R. Eswari

== Release and reception ==
The film was released on 29 October 1970, and became moderately successful.
