= Gowri Kalyanam =

- Theatrical release poster
- Directed by: K. Shankar
- Screenplay by: K. Shankar
- Story by: Bilahari
- Produced by: G. V. Saravanan
- Starring: Jaishankar; Jayalalithaa; Ravichandran; Sheela
- Cinematography: Thambu
- Edited by: K. Narayanan
- Music by: M. S. Viswanathan
- Production company: Saravana Combines
- Distributed by: Sri Jai Maruthy Combines
- Release date: 11 November 1966
- Running time: 145 minutes
- Country: India
- Language: Tamil

Gowri Kalyanam (transl. The Marriage of Gowri) is a 1966 Indian Tamil-language film, directed by K. Shankar and produced by G. V. Saravanan. The film stars Jaishankar, Jayalalitha, Ravichandran, Sheela and Nagesh. It was released on 11 November 1966.

== Cast ==
- Jaishankar as Raju
- Jayalalithaa as Gowri
- Ravichandran as Ramu
- Sheela as Lakshmi
- Nagesh as School teacher
- Manorama as Ayyakkanu's wife
- Pandari Bai as Kamatchi
- S. N. Lakshmi asr Ramu's aunt
- S. V. Ramadas as Ayyakannu
- V. S. Raghavan as Vedhagiri
- K. Vijayan as Kuthalalingam
- Karikol Raju as Vaithiyar
- Pakoda Kadhar as school student
- Master Prabhakar as Ganaprakasam
- Omakuchi Narasimhan
- Dhanaraj
- M. A. Ganapathy
- Pasupathy
- Natarajan
- Lakshmi Kumar

== Soundtrack ==
The music was composed by M. S. Viswanathan.

Song	Singers	Lyrics
"Varanum Varanum Maharani"	T. M. Soundararajan, P. Susheela	Poovai Senguttuvan
"Thottathu Pole Kanavu Kanden"	T. M. Soundararajan, P. Susheela	Poovai Senguttuvan
"Vellaikkamalathiley"	Soolamangalam Rajalakshmi	Bharathiyar
"Oruvar Manadhai"	T. M. Soundararajan	Kannadasan
"Thiruppugazhaip Padap Pada"	Soolamangalam Rajalakshmi & P. Suseela	Poovai Senguttuvan

== Reception ==
Kalki said that, had many unnecessary scenes been cut and thereby improving the pacing, the film would have been better.
