= Ravichandran (Tamil actor) =

Tamil actor (died 2011)

- Born: B. S. Raman; 30 March 1940; Kuala Lumpur, Federated Malay States
- Died: 25 July 2011 (aged 71)
- Occupations: Actor; Film director; Agriculturist
- Years active: 1964–2011
- Spouse(s): Vimala; Sheela (divorced)
- Children: 3
- Relatives: Hamsavardhan (son); George Vishnu (son); Tanya Ravichandran (granddaughter)

Ravichandran (30 March 1940 – 25 July 2011) was a Malaysian-born Indian actor who played lead hero roles in Tamil films from 1964 to 1979. He also acted in supporting roles from 1986, and directed a few films.

He was given the title of "Kalaingnar Thilagham" in many of the on-screen credits of films starring him in the lead role. He was also called "Puratchi Kalaignar" (Refer: Anandha Bairavi Tamil Movie Title Scene).

== Life ==
Ravichandran is a Tamil, born B. S. Raman in Kuala Lumpur, capital of the Federated Malay States. He moved to Tiruchirappalli, India in 1951, and studied at St. Joseph's College. Before entering cinema, during his studies in Trichy, he has acted in two dramas, namely, Aanaiyidungal Anna and Udhaya Suriyan. After entering cinema, he has acted in two dramas, namely, Mapplley Yen Magalaik Kadhali and That Man from Poonthamallee.

He was married twice; he first married Vimala, with whom he has a daughter, Lavanya, and two sons, Balaji and Hamsavardhan. Thereafter, he married Malayalam actress Sheela, and had a son George Vishnu. After his divorce with the latter he got back with his first wife. His sons Hamsavardhan and George also took up acting as a career, with Hamsavardhan starring in the film Manthiran, directed by Ravichandran himself. His granddaughter Tanya Ravichandran debuted in Balle Vellaiyathevaa.

== Career ==
Ravichandran was introduced by director C. V. Sridhar in his film Kadhalikka Neramillai in the year 1964. In the course of his many future films, he became the star of hope for many producers since right from his debut film, all his starrers became hits. He had played many lead roles in the Tamil movies of 1960s and 1970s. He had a long career in films and had many hits like Gowri Kalyanam (1966), Athey Kangal (1967), Naan (1967) and Moondrezhuthu (1968). He also acted a few malayalams films suchs as Vimochanasamaram (1971), Aromalunni (1972), Sakthi (1972) and Sikharangal (1979). He collaborated with Rajinikanth's starrer Guru Sishyan (1988), Raja Chinna Roja (1989) and Arunachalam (1997) whose films were all commercial successes. He co-starring with actor Vijayakanth in Amman Kovil Kizhakale (1986), Oomai Vizhigal (1986), Ninaive Oru Sangeetham (1987), Sattam Oru Vilayaattu (1987), Therkathi Kallan (1988), Poruthathu Pothum (1989), Ramana (2002) and Thennavan (2003). He directed two films with his son Hamsavardhan for his debut Maanaseega Kadhal (1999) and Manthiran (2005). The last film, he was seen on screen was Aadu Puli (2011).

== Filmography ==
Year	Film	Role	Notes
1964	Kadhalikka Neramillai	Ashok	Debut film
1965	Idhaya Kamalam	Bhaskar	
1965	Kalyana Mandapam		
1966	Motor Sundaram Pillai	Mohan	
1966	Kumari Penn	Kanthan	
1966	Thedi Vandha Thirumagal		
1966	Enga Paappa	Mangalam's brother	
1966	Naam Moovar		
1966	Gowri Kalyanam	Ramu	
1966	Madras to Pondicherry	Bhaskar	
1967	Thanga Thambi	Venu/Venugopal	
1967	Magaraasi		
1967	Adhey Kangal	Bhaskar	
1967	Valiba Virundhu	Ravi	
1967	Maadi Veettu Mappilai	Somu	
1967	Ethirigal Jakkirathai	Dr. Baskar	
1967	Ninaivil Nindraval	Prakash	
1967	Naan	Sekar / Chinnaraja	
1968	Panakkara Pillai	Ravi; Chandran	
1968	Nimirndhu Nil		
1968	Andru Kanda Mugam	Rajendran	In This Film He has got the title 'Kalai Selvam'
1968	Moondrezhuthu	Maran	
1968	Selviyin Selvan		
1968	Sathiyam Thavaradhey		
1968	Delhi Mapillai	Raja	
1968	Neeyum Naanum		
1968	Naalum Therindhavan		
1969	Odum Nadhi		
1969	Singapore Seeman		
1969	Chella Penn		
1970	Jeevanadi		
1970	Yaen?	Sekar	
1970	Kadhal Jothi		
1970	Snegithi		
1970	Kaaviya Thalaivi	Arun	
1970	Malathi	Anandhan	
1971	Nangu Suvargal	Ravi	
1971	Justice Viswanathan	Gopinathan	
1971	Sabatham	Prakash	
1971	Uttharavindri Ulle Vaa	Ravi	
1971	Meendum Vazhven	Raju	
1971	Thulli Odum Pullimaan		
1971	Vimochanasamaram		Malayalam film
1971	Pattondru Ketten		
1971	Poi Sollathey		
1971	Agnimrigam	Vijayan	Malayalam film
1972	Aromalunni	Kannappanunni; Chandrappan	Malayalam film
1972	Omana	Baby	Malayalam film
1972	Ellai Kodu		
1972	Puguntha Veedu		
1972	Sakthi		Malayalam film
1973	Manjal Kungumam		
1973	Valli Deivanai		
1973	Veettukku Vandha Marumagal		
1973	Baghdad Perazhagi	Abdullah	
1974	Pathu Madha Bandham		Guest Appearance
1974	Appa Amma		
1974	Roshakkari		
1974	Magalukkaga		Guest Appearance
1974	Avalukku Nigar Avale		
1974	Sorgathil Thirumanam		
1974	Akkarai Pachai		
1974	Pudhiya Manidhan		
1975	Amudha		
1975	Engalukkum Kadhal Varum		
1975	Thai Veetu Seedhanam		
1975	Avalukku Aayiram Kangal		
1976	Varaprasadham		
1976	Janaki sabatham		
1977	Nee Vaazha Vendum		
1978	Iravu 12 Mani		
1979	Neeya?	Ravi	
1979	Kavari Maan	Anand	
1979	Sikharangal	Surendran	Malayalam film
1980	Bombay Mail 109		
1985	Sugamana Raagangal		
1985	Ketti Melam	Chinna Sethupathi	
1986	Murattuk Karangal	Muthu	
1986	Amman Kovil Kizhakale	Kanmani's father	
1986	Oomai Vizhigal	P.R.K	
1987	Neethikku Thandanai		
1987	Ninaive Oru Sangeetham	Gowrishankar	
1987	Ondru Engal Jaathiye..!		
1987	Sattam Oru Vilayaattu	DCP Needhi Manikkam	
1987	Chellakutti		
1987	Ivargal Varungala Thoongal		
1988	Guru Sishyan	Rajamanickam	
1988	Therkathi Kallan	Ravi	
1988	Paadatha Theneekkal		
1989	Oru Thottil Sabadham		
1989	Sattathin Thirappu Vizhaa	Ethiraj	
1989	Raja Chinna Roja	Rajaram	
1989	Poruthathu Pothum	Azhala Sundaram	
1989	Chinnappadass		
1990	Paattukku Naan Adimai		
1990	Naanum Indha Ooruthan		
1991	Manitha Jaathi		
1991	Thanthu Vitten Ennai	Kalyani's husband	Guest appearance
1992	Sevagan		Guest appearance
1993	Pudhiya Mugam	Raja Rajeswaran's Sri Lankan enemy	
1994	En Rajangam	Kodandam	
1995	Karnaa	Arjun's father	
1997	Arunachalam	Ammayappan	
1999	Maanaseega Kadhal		Also director
2002	Pammal K. Sambandam	Sambandam's uncle	
2002	Ramana	Chief Minister of Tamil Nadu	
2003	Thennavan	Azhagarsamy	
2003	Indru Mudhal	Krishna's father	
2003	Tagore	Judge	Telugu film
2004	Thendral	Singara Velu Nayagar	
2004	Gambeeram		Guest appearance
2005	Manthiran		Also director
2006	Adaikalam	Thamizh's father-in-law	
2009	Kanden Kadhalai	Anjali's grandfather	
2011	Aadu Puli	Sabapathy	
2019	Petta	Abdul Marakkayar	Photo only
