= Kumari Penn =

- Directed by: T. R. Ramanna
- Produced by: E. V. Rajan
- Starring: Ravichandran; Jayalalithaa
- Music by: M. S. Viswanathan
- Production company: E.V.R. Pictures
- Release date: 6 May 1966
- Running time: 154 minutes
- Country: India
- Language: Tamil

Kumari Penn (transl. Young girl) is a 1966 Indian Tamil-language film, directed by T. R. Ramanna and produced by E. V. Rajan. The film stars Ravichandran and Jayalalitha, with S. V. Ranga Rao and Nagesh in supporting roles. It was released on 6 May 1966. The film was remade in Hindi as Man Ka Meet (1969), in Malayalam as Rathimanmadhan (1977) and in Kannada as Hudugatada Hudugi (1976).

== Cast ==
- Ravichandran as Kanthan
- Jayalalitha as Syamala
- S. V. Ranga Rao as Ranganathan
- Nagesh as R. Sattanathan
- Prabhakar as Doctor
- R. S. Manohar as Devarajan
- Sedhupathy as Ramalingam
- Ennatha Kannaiah as Rathnam
- C. K. Saraswathi as Seetha
- S. N. Lakshmi as Kanthan's mother
- Madhavi

== Soundtrack ==
The music was composed by M. S. Viswanathan, with lyrics by Kannadasan.

Song	Singers
"Then Irukkum Malarinile"	P. Susheela
"Varushathai Paaru Aruvathi Aaru"	T. M. Soundararajan
"Jaavera Jaa"	P. B. Sreenivas
"Yaaro Aada Therinthavar"	L. R. Eswari
"Neeye Sollu"	L. R. Eswari, P. B. Sreenivas
"Varushathai Paaru"	L. R. Eswari
"Pathi Udal Theriya"	T. M. Soundararajan

== Reception ==
Kalki wrote that the film could be watched once for its story. The film ran for over 100 days in theatres.

== Bibliography ==
- Rajadhyaksha, Ashish; Willemen, Paul (1998) [1994]. Encyclopaedia of Indian Cinema. British Film Institute and Oxford University Press. ISBN 0-19-563579-5.
