= Enga Paappa =

1966 film by B. R. Panthulu

- Theatrical release poster
- Directed by: B. R. Panthulu
- Story by: Dada Mirasi
- Produced by: B. R. Panthulu
- Starring: Baby Shakila; M. V. Rajamma; Ravichandran; Bharathi
- Cinematography: V. Ramamurthy
- Edited by: R. Devarajan
- Music by: M. S. Viswanathan
- Production company: Padmini Pictures
- Distributed by: Vijayasri
- Release date: 8 July 1966
- Country: India
- Language: Tamil

Enga Paappa (transl. Our Baby) is a 1966 Indian Tamil-language drama film produced and directed by B. R. Panthulu. The film stars Baby Shakila, M. V. Rajamma, Ravichandran and Bharathi. It was released on 8 July 1966.

== Cast ==
- Baby Shakila as Mangalam
- M. V. Rajamma as Mangalam's aunt
- Ravichandran as Mangalam's brother
  - Master Sridhar portrays the younger version of the character
- O. A. K. Thevar as Ravichandran's friend
- Bharathi as Ravichandran's wife
- Nagesh
- K. A. Thangavelu
- Manorama

== Production ==
Enga Paappa was produced and directed by B. R. Panthulu under his own company Padmini Pictures, while Dada Mirasi wrote the story and Ma. Ra wrote the dialogues. The cinematography was handled by V. Ramamurthy, and the editing by R. Devarajan edited the film. Audiography was handled by T. N. Rangaswami, and Thangappan for choreography. Shooting took place at Vauhini Studios.

== Soundtrack ==
The music of the film was composed by M. S. Viswanathan, with lyrics by Kannadasan. One of the songs, "Naan Pottal Theriyum", attained popularity.

Songs	Singers	Length
"Oru Maratthil Kudiyirukkum"	P. Susheela	3:33
"Oru Maratthil Kudiyirukkum"	T. M. Soundararajan & M. S. Rajeswari	3:37
"Sondha Maamanukkum"	T. M. Soundararajan & L. R. Eswari	4:05
"Pudhu Veedu Vandha Neram"	T. M. Soundararajan & P. Susheela	3:55
"Naan Pottal Theriyum"	T. M. Soundararajan	3:23

== Release and reception ==
Enga Paappa was released on 8 July 1966, and distributed by Vijayasri. The film attained popularity due to its unconventional storyline, and Shakila's portrayal of Mangalam was well received by viewers. It was also a commercial success. However, Kalki wrote that while the film was trying to please everyone, it was not heart touching.
