= Naam Moovar =

- Theatrical release poster
- Directed by: Jambulingam
- Story by: Mahendran
- Produced by: K. R. Balan
- Starring: Jaishankar; Ravichandran; L. Vijayalakshmi; Rathna; Nagesh
- Cinematography: M. Karnan
- Music by: S. M. Subbaiah Naidu
- Production company: Balan Pictures
- Distributed by: Vijayasri
- Release date: 5 August 1966
- Running time: 140 minutes
- Country: India
- Language: Tamil

Naam Moovar (transl. We Three) is a 1966 Indian Tamil-language comedy drama film, directed by Jambulingam. The film's story was written by Mahendran and dialogue by Mullai Sakthi respectively. It stars Jaishankar, Ravichandran and Nagesh playing major roles, with L. Vijayalakshmi, Rathna, V. K. Ramasamy and Pandari Bai playing pivotal roles. The film was released on 5 August 1966, and was a huge success at the box-office.

== Cast ==
- Jaishankar
- Ravichandran
- Nagesh
- V. K. Ramasamy
- L. Vijayalakshmi
- Rathna
- Pandari Bai
- Madhavi
- Sarojini
- Mala
- Thangavelu
- Rajamani
- Kumar
- Jo
- Ramani

== Production ==
Naam Moovar was the first film for which Mahendran wrote the story. K. R. Balan, who was a friend of M. G. Ramachandran, decided to produce a film after being impressed by the script of Mahendran with P. Madhavan as director. However four days after the shoot, Madhavan left the film as he could not handle such a different plot and Mahendran left the sets and went to his village without informing anyone. A few days later, Balan wrote a letter inviting him to return to Madras; he insisted Mahendran to add more commercial elements to the script and made the editor Jambulingam to direct the film to which Mahendran agreed.

== Soundtrack ==
Music was by S. M. Subbaiah Naidu and lyrics were written by Vaali. The song "Pirantha Naal Indru" became hugely popular and was often played in birthday shows in Ceylon Radio.

Song	Singers	Length
"Pirantha Naal Indru"	T. M. Soundararajan	05:14
"Adi lalla Lalla Ellam Vaarungadi"	T. M. Soundararajan, P. Susheela	04:52
"Singapore Machaan"	T. M. Soundararajan, L. R. Eswari	04:31
"Vayathu Vandha Pennai"	T. M. Soundararajan, P. Susheela	04:13
"Naanoru Pakkam"	L. R. Eswari, S. C. Krishnan	04:57

== Release and reception ==
Naam Moovar was released on 5 August 1966. Kalki gave the film a mixed review, but appreciated the performance of Nagesh, Ravichandran and Jaishankar. The film became successful at box-office.

== Bibliography ==
- Mahendran (2013) [2004]. சினிமாவும் நானும் [Cinema and I] (in Tamil). Karpagam Publications. OCLC 54777094.
