= Kallum Kaniyagum =

- Poster
- Directed by: K. Shankar
- Screenplay by: K. Shankar
- Story by: N. Amirthalingam
- Produced by: T. M. Soundararajan; A. L. Raghavan
- Starring: T. M. Soundararajan; Rajasree; A. L. Raghavan; M. N. Rajam
- Cinematography: W. R. Subbarao
- Edited by: K. Narayanan
- Music by: M. S. Viswanathan
- Production company: Sounthar Raagavan Movies
- Release date: 1968
- Country: India
- Language: Tamil

Kallum Kaniyagum (transl. Even the stone will become a fruit) is a 1968 Indian Tamil-language film, written and directed by K. Shankar and produced by T. M. Soundararajan and A. L. Raghavan. The film stars T. M. Soundararajan, Rajasree, A. L. Raghavan and M. N. Rajam.

== Cast ==
- T. M. Soundararajan
- Rajasree
- A. L. Raghavan
- M. N. Rajam
- Nagesh
- Sachu
- Kallapart Natarajan
- Typist Gopu
- Friend Ramasamy
- Master Prabhakar
- Kanagaraj
- Mohan
- Sethupathi
- Usilaimani
- Rajeswari
- S. N. Lakshmi
- Chandra
- Sarala
- Baby Raji
- Vijayakumari in guest appearance
- S. V. Sahasranamam in guest appearance

== Soundtrack ==
The music was composed by M. S. Viswanathan.

Song	Singers	Lyrics
"Kai Viralil Piranthathu Naadham"	T. M. Soundararajan	Vaali
"Enge Naan Vaazhnthalum"	T. M. Soundararajan	Kannadasan
"Birds On Tree, Girls Are Free"	L. R. Eswari	vaali
"Athaan"	A. L. Raghavan, P. Susheela	Vaali
"Naan Kadvula Kanden"	T. M. Soundararajan	Vaali
