= Delhi Mapillai =

- Title card
- Directed by: Devan
- Screenplay by: M. Lakshmanan
- Story by: S. Aiyapillai
- Produced by: V. K. Ramasamy; V. K. Muthuramalingam
- Starring: Ravichandran; Rajasree; Sachu
- Cinematography: M. Karnan
- Edited by: R. Devarajan; S. P. S. Veerappa
- Music by: K. V. Mahadevan
- Production company: Poonmagal Productions
- Release date: 13 September 1968
- Country: India
- Language: Tamil

Delhi Mapillai (transl. The Son-In-Law from Delhi) is a 1968 Indian Tamil-language comedy film directed by Devan. It stars Ravichandran, Rajasree and Sachu. The film revolves around two sons teaching a lesson to their father who disregards the poor. It was released on 13 September 1968.

== Plot ==
A wealthy but haughty man disregards poor people. His two sons orchestrate a plan to teach humility to their arrogant, elitist father who disregards the poor. The two brothers orchestrate a series of comedic schemes to teach their father humility and respect for the less fortunate.

== Cast ==
- Ravichandran
- Rajasree
- Sachu
- V. K. Ramasamy
- Cho
- Manorama
- O. A. K. Thevar
- Suruli Rajan

== Soundtrack ==
The music was composed by K. V. Mahadevan.

Track listing
No.	Title	Lyrics	Singer(s)	Length
1.	"Aandavan Oru Naal"	Vaali	T. M. Soundararajan
2.	"Andam Bahirandam"	A. Maruthakasi	S. C. Krishnan, S. V. Ponnusamy, L. R. Eswari, T. M. Soundararajan
3.	"Malaimudiyil Paniyazhagu"	A. Maruthakasi	P. Susheela, K. Jamuna Rani
4.	"Paadatha Paadal"	Vaali	T. M. Soundararajan, P. Susheela
5.	"Jokkuthan Jollythan"	Vaali	P. Susheela, L. R. Eswari
6.	"Rama Rama Ramaiya"	A. Maruthakasi	S. V. Ponnusamy
7.	"Thirumbi Paarunga"	A. Maruthakasi	K. Jamuna Rani
8.	"Jingaale Jingaale Jingaale"	A. Maruthakasi	S. V. Ponnusamy, K. Jamuna Rani
