= Gemini Ganesan filmography =

This article contains the entire filmography of Gemini Ganesan.

== Films ==
Year	Title	Role(s)	Language(s)	Notes	Ref(s)
1947	Miss Malini	Kumar	Tamil	Billed as "R.G."	
1948	Chakra Dhari	Panduranga	Tamil	Credited as Ganesh	
1952	Thai Ullam	Sekar	Tamil	Credited as R. Ganesh	
1952	Moondru Pillaigal	Sekhar	Tamil	Credited as Ganesh	
1952	Mugguru Kodukulu	Gopal	Telugu	Credited as Ganesh	
1953	Avvaiyyar	Deiveegan	Tamil	Credited as Ganesan	
1953	Ashadeepam	Shekhar	Malayalam	Simultaneously made in Tamil as Aasai Magan	
1953	Aasai Magan	Shekhar	Tamil	Credited as R. Ganesh	
1953	Manam Pola Mangalyam		Tamil	Credited as R. Ganesh	
1954	Penn	Raja	Tamil		
1955	Missiamma	Balu	Tamil	Credited as R. Ganesh	
1955	Valliyin Selvan	Murthy	Tamil	Credited as R. Ganesan	
1955	Kanavane Kankanda Deivam	Vijayan	Tamil	Credited as R. Ganesh	
1955	Needhipathi		Tamil		
1955	Maaman Magal	Chandran	Tamil		
1955	Maheswari	Manickam	Tamil		
1955	Guna Sundari	Prince	Tamil		
1956	Devta	Vijay	Hindi	Credited as Ganesh	
1956	Pennin Perumai	Raghu	Tamil		
1956	Aasai	Sekar	Tamil		
1956	Prema Pasam	Ramu	Tamil		
1956	Sadhaaram		Tamil		
1956	Kaalam Maari Pochu		Tamil		
1956	Marma Veeran		Tamil	Guest appearance	
1956	Mathar Kula Manikkam	Chandra Shekar	Tamil		
1957	Miss Mary	Arun	Hindi	Credited as Ganesh	
1957	Mayabazar	Abhimanyu	Tamil		
1957	Iru Sagodharigal	Sundar	Tamil		
1957	Manaalane Mangaiyin Baakkiyam	Jayanthan	Tamil		
1957	Karpukkarasi	Prathaban	Tamil		
1957	Mallika	Mohan	Tamil		
1957	Yaar Paiyyan	Sundararajan	Tamil		
1957	Soubhagyavathi	Kalantharan	Tamil		
1957	Pathini Deivam	Rajendran	Tamil		
1958	Bhooloka Rambai	Bhuvanendran	Tamil	Simultaneously shot in Telugu as Bhooloka Rambha	
1958	School Master		Kannada	Guest appearance	
1958	Manamalai		Tamil		
1958	Kudumba Gouravam	Gopal	Tamil		
1958	Pathi Bakthi	Moorthi	Tamil		
1958	Vanji Kottai Valipan	Sunderalingam	Tamil		
1958	Thirumanam	Nataraj	Tamil		
1958	Illarame Nallaram		Tamil		
1958	Raj Tilak	Chander	Hindi		
1958	Kadan Vaangi Kalyaanam	Raja	Tamil		
1958	Athisaya Thirudan	Athisaya Thirudan	Tamil		
1959	Ponnu Vilayum Bhoomi	Nallan	Tamil		
1959	Kalyana Parisu	Baskar	Tamil		
1959	Nalla Theerpu		Tamil		
1959	Veerapandiya Kattabomman	Vellaiyathevan	Tamil		
1959	Bhagya Devathai		Tamil		
1959	Penn Kulathin Pon Vilakku	Kothandam	Tamil		
1959	Vaazha Vaitha Deivam		Tamil		
1960	Parthiban Kanavu	Vikraman	Tamil		
1960	Ellarum Innattu Mannar		Tamil		
1960	Meenda Sorgam	Sekar	Tamil		
1960	Kalathur Kannamma	Rajalingam	Tamil		
1960	Kairasi	Mohan	Tamil		
1960	Pudhiya Pathai		Tamil		
1960	Veerakkanal	Parandhaman	Tamil		
1961	Paava Mannippu	Rajan	Tamil		
1961	Nazrana	Shyam	Hindi		
1961	Pasamalar	Anand	Tamil		
1961	Thennilavu	Raj	Tamil		
1961	Bhagyalakshmi		Tamil		
1961	Kappalottiya Thamizhan	Madasamy	Tamil		
1961	Pangaaligal		Tamil		
1961	Panithirai	Mohan	Tamil		
1962	Konjum Salangai	Amanendran	Tamil		
1962	Paarthal Pasi Theerum	Velu	Tamil		
1962	Manithan Maravillai	Panjacharam	Tamil		
1962	Aadi Perukku	Raja	Tamil		
1962	Mangaiyar Ullam Mangatha Selvam		Tamil		
1962	Kathiruntha Kangal	Krishnan	Tamil		
1962	Paadha Kaanikkai	Sekar	Tamil		
1962	Bandha Pasam	Saravanan	Tamil		
1962	Sumaithaangi	Babu	Tamil		
1963	Lava Kusa	Lakshmana	Tamil		
1963	Idhayathil Nee	Advocate Anandhan	Tamil		
1963	Karpagam	Sundaram	Tamil		
1963	Ezhai Pangalan	Raja	Tamil		
1964	Pasamum Nesamum		Tamil		
1964	Vazhkai Vazhvatharke	Kandan	Tamil		
1964	Oral Koodi Kallanayi		Malayalam		
1964	Veeranganai		Tamil		
1964	Aayiram Roobai		Tamil		
1965	Poojaikku Vandha Malar	Suresh	Tamil		
1965	Vaazhkai Padagu	Rajan	Tamil		
1965	Hello Mister Zamindar	Sekar	Tamil		
1965	Vallavanukku Vallavan	Prakash	Tamil		
1965	Veera Abhimanyu	Krishna	Tamil		
1966	Chitthi	Muthaiyya	Tamil		
1966	Muharasi	Somu	Tamil		
1966	Annavin Aasai	Ramanathan	Tamil		
1966	Ramu	Raja	Tamil		
1966	Chinnanchiru Ulagam		Tamil		
1966	Saraswathi Sabatham	Veeramallan	Tamil		
1966	Thenmazhai	Baskar	Tamil		
1967	Pattathu Rani		Tamil		
1967	Kandhan Karunai	Shiva	Tamil		
1967	Seetha		Tamil	100th Film	
1967	Thiruvarutchelvar	Shiva	Tamil		
1967	Pandhayam		Tamil		
1967	Penn Endral Penn	Babu	Tamil		
1968	Panama Pasama	Shankar	Tamil		
1968	Thamarai Nenjam	Murali	Tamil		
1968	Balram Shri Krishna	Lord Shankar	Hindi		
1968	Chakkaram	Babu	Tamil		
1968	Siritha Mugam		Tamil		
1969	Kuzhandhai Ullam		Tamil		
1969	Porchilai		Tamil		
1969	Aindhu Laksham	Radha Krishnan	Tamil		
1969	Poova Thalaiya	Ganesan	Tamil		
1969	Manaivi		Tamil		
1969	Shanti Nilayam	Bhaskar	Tamil		
1969	Kulavilakku		Tamil		
1969	Thanga Malar		Tamil		
1969	Iru Kodugal	Gopinath	Tamil		
1969	Avare En Deivam		Tamil	Credited as Gemini Ganesh	
1969	Kumara Sambhavam	Paramashivan	Malayalam		
1970	Sangamam		Tamil		
1970	Ethirkalam	Ramu	Tamil		
1970	Thabalkaran Thangai	Postman	Tamil		
1970	Vairakiyam		Tamil		
1970	Patham Pasali		Tamil		
1970	Snegithi		Tamil		
1970	Kann Malar		Tamil		
1970	Kaviya Thalaivi	Suresh	Tamil		
1970	Malathi	Balu	Tamil		
1971	Nootrukku Nooru	College principal	Tamil	Guest appearance	
1971	Thirumagal	Kandasamy	Tamil		
1971	Avalukendru Or Manam	Kannan	Tamil		
1971	Veguli Penn	Ramu	Tamil		
1971	Therottam		Tamil		
1971	Aana Valarthiya Vanampadiyude Makan		Malayalam		
1971	Sudarum Sooravaliyum		Tamil		
1971	Annai Velankanni	Susai Nathan	Tamil		
1971	Anbukkor Annan		Tamil		
1971	Aathi Parasakthi	Shiva	Tamil		
1971	Punnagai	Sathya	Tamil		
1971	Ranga Rattinam		Tamil		
1972	Kanna Nalama	Anand	Tamil		
1972	Enna Muthalali Sowkiyama		Tamil		
1972	Professor	Mangalassery	Malayalam		
1972	Appa Tata		Tamil		
1972	Kurathi Magan	Malai Kottai	Tamil		
1972	Shakthi Leelai	Lord Shiva	Tamil		
1972	Ellai Kodu		Tamil		
1972	Velli Vizha	Bala	Tamil		
1972	Sree Guruvayoorappan		Malayalam		
1972	Deivam	Aarumugam	Tamil		
1973	Ganga Gowri	Shiva	Tamil		
1973	Nalla Mudivu		Tamil		
1973	Thirumalai Deivam	Aagasarajan	Tamil		
1973	Malai Naattu Mangai		Tamil		
1973	Kattila Thottila	Advocate Sundaram	Tamil		
1973	School Master		Tamil		
1973	Jesus	Snapaka Yohannan (John the Baptist)	Malayalam		
1974	Maanikka Thottil		Tamil		
1974	Appa Amma		Tamil		
1974	Naan Avanillai	Various (Note: Gemini Ganesan played a single character with different names including David, 'Nanjil' Nambi, 'Kancheepuram' Aachari, Akbar Ali, Lakshmanan Sharma, Sahadeva Shastri, Hariharadas Swamigal, Jack Solomon, and Shathurukanan Menon.)	Tamil	Also producer	
1974	Devi Kanyakumari	Vasudevan	Malayalam		
1974	Devi Sri Karumari Amman		Tamil		
1975	Uravukku Kai Koduppom		Tamil		
1975	Swami Ayyappan	Pandalam Raja	Malayalam	Simultaneously made in Tamil	
1976	Unakkaga Naan		Tamil		
1976	Dasavatharam	Arjuna	Tamil		
1976	Idhaya Malar	Krishnan	Tamil	Also director	
1976	Jai Jagat Janani	Shiva	Hindi		
1976	Lalitha	Shankar	Tamil		
1977	Sreemurukan	Lord Shiva	Malayalam		
1977	Naam Pirandha Mann	Joseph	Tamil		
1978	Sandharbha		Kannada		
1978	Sri Kanchi Kamakshi		Tamil		
1978	Bhrashtu		Malayalam		
1979	Allauddinum Albhutha Vilakkum	Mir Qasim	Malayalam	Simultaneously made in Tamil as Allauddinun Arputha Vilakkum	
1979	Gnana Kuzhandhai	Shiva	Tamil		
1980	Esthappan		Malayalam		
1983	Nenjodu Nenjam		Tamil		
1983	Oppantham		Tamil		
1983	Soorakottai Singakutti		Tamil		
1988	Rudraveena	Ganapati Sastry	Telugu		
1988	Unnal Mudiyum Thambi	Marthandam Pillai	Tamil		
1989	Ponmana Selvan	Arunachalam (Ambalathar)	Tamil		
1996	Avvai Shanmugi	Viswanatha Iyer	Tamil		
1996	Mettukudi	Indhu's grandfather	Tamil		
1997	Kaalamellam Kadhal Vaazhga	Kausalya's grandfather	Tamil		
1998	Naam Iruvar Namakku Iruvar	Prabhu's grandfather	Tamil		
1998	Kondattam	Anand's grandfather	Tamil		
1999	Thodarum	Seetha's grandfather	Tamil		
2002	Gemini	Himself	Tamil	Guest appearance	
2004	Adi Thadi	Himself	Tamil	Guest appearance	

== Television ==
Year	Serial	Role
1991	Penn	
2000–2001	Krishnadasi	Rudhramurthi Sastri
