= List of Tamil films of 1972 =

Post-amendment to the Tamil Nadu Entertainments Tax Act 1939 on 1 April 1958, Gross jumped to 140 per cent of Nett Commercial Taxes Department disclosed ₹10.92 crore in entertainment tax revenue for the year.

The following is a list of films produced in the Tamil film industry in India in 1972, in alphabetical order.

== Released films ==
Opening		Title	Director	Cast	Production	Ref
J A N	1	Dhakam	Babu Nanthancode	R. Muthuraman, Nanditha Bose, Major Sundarrajan, Rajakokila, Pandari Bai	Kavya Chithra Productions	
J A N	1	Itho Enthan Deivam	A. C. Tirulokchandar	K. R. Vijaya, R. Muthuraman, Major Sundarrajan, Nagesh, V. K. Ramasamy, M. Bhanumathi	Amutham Pictures	
J A N	1	Thaikku Oru Pillai	Pattu	Jaishankar, Savitri, A. V. M. Rajan, Vennira Aadai Nirmala, Cho, Manorama, Thengai Srinivasan, K. Balaji	Sri Navaneedha Films	
J A N	1	Ashirvadham	R. Devarajan	Jaishankar, Lakshmi, Thengai Srinivasan, M. R. R. Vasu, A. Sakunthala, S. V. Subbaiah	Devagi Pictures	
J A N	12	Kanna Nalama	K. Balachander	Gemini Ganesan, Jayanthi, Major Sundarrajan, Kumari Padmini, M. R. R. Vasu, Manorama	Rathnasabapathi Films	
J A N	14	Rani Yaar Kuzhanthai	D. Yoganand	Jaishankar, Lakshmi, Baby Rani, R. Muthuraman, T. S. Balaiah, Suruli Rajan, Manorama, Major Sundarrajan	Jupiter Art Pictures	
J A N	15	Agathiyar	A. P. Nagarajan	Sirkazhi Govindarajan, T. R. Mahalingam, A. V. M. Rajan, Lakshmi, Kumari Padmini, C. R. Vijayakumari, T. K. Bagavathy, Sivakumar, A. Sakunthala, Suruli Rajan, Manorama, Sridevi	Shri Vijayalakshmi Pictures	
J A N	15	Ganga	M. Karnan	Jaishankar, Rajakokila, Nagesh, A. Sakunthala, Jayakumari	Indhrani Films	
J A N	26	Raja	C. V. Rajendran	Sivaji Ganesan, Jayalalitha, K. Balaji Ranga Rao Chandra Babu Sundarrajan	Sujatha Cine Arts	
F E B	4	Sange Muzhangu	P. Neelakantan	M. G. Ramachandran, Lakshmi, Cho Asogan V. K. Ramasamy V. S. Raghavan	Valli Films	
F E B	9	Ellai Kodu	S. Raghavan	Gemini Ganesan, Ravichandran, C. R. Vijayakumari, Rajasree, Vennira Aadai Moorthy, Sachu, T. S. Balaiah	Swarnalakshmi Company	
F E B	11	Enna Muthalali Sowkiyama	Malliyam Rajagopal	Gemini Ganesan, K. R. Vijaya, Nagesh, Major Sundarrajan, Jayabharathi	Anna Productions	
F E B	11	Dhikku Theriyadha Kaattil	N. C. Chakravarthy	Jayalalitha, R. Muthuraman, Nagesh, V. K. Ramasamy, Sachu, Baby Sumathi	Ramkumar Films	
F E B	19	Savalukku Savaal	H. S. Venu	Jaishankar	Maha Ganapathy Pictures	
F E B	25	Kadhalikka Vanga	I. N. Murthy	Jaishankar, Kavitha, Major Sundarrajan, Thengai Srinivasan, Manorama, Srikanth, Vijaya Girija, Shabnam	Comedy Pictures	
M A R	3	Nawab Naarkali	C. V. Rajendran	Jaishankar, Lakshmi, Nagesh, V. K. Ramasamy, Rama Prabha	Vijay Pictures	
M A R	10	Nalla Neram	M. A. Thirumugam	M. G. Ramachandran, K. R. Vijaya, Nagesh, Thengai Srinivasan, Sachu	Devar Films	
M A R	11	Gnana Oli	P. Madhavan	Sivaji Ganesan, Sharada, Srikanth, Vijaya Nirmala, Major Sundarrajan	Jayaar Movies	
M A R	27	Appa Tata	Malliyam Rajagopal	Gemini Ganesan, Padmini, Sowcar Janaki, Major Sundarrajan, Nagesh, Manorama, V. K. Ramasamy	Sri Venkateswara Production	
A P R	13	Raman Thediya Seethai	P. Neelakantan	M. G. Ramachandran, Jayalalitha, Nagesh, Manorama, Rama Prabha	Jayanthi Films	
A P R	13	Puguntha Veedu	Pattu	A. V. M. Rajan, Ravichandran, Savitri, Lakshmi, Chandrakala, Cho, Manorama	Sri Navaneedha Films	
A P R	13	Ponmagal Vandhal	Vijaya Narayanan	Jaishankar, Lakshmi, M. N. Nambiar, R. Muthuraman	Manorama Movies	
A P R	13	Mr. Sampath	Cho	R. Muthuraman, Jaya, Cho, Manorama	Vivek Chitra Productions	
A P R	29	Kurathi Magan	K. S. Gopalakrishnan	Gemini Ganesan, K. R. Vijaya, Master Sridhar, Jayachitra, Suruli Rajan	Ravi Productions	
M A Y	6	Pattikada Pattanama	P. Madhavan	Sivaji Ganesan, Jayalalitha, V. K. Ramasamy, M. R. R. Vasu, Manorama, Sukumari	Arun Prasad Movies	
M A Y	15	Shakthi Leelai	T. R. Ramanna	Gemini Ganesan, Jayalalitha, K. R. Vijaya, A. V. M. Rajan, B. Saroja Devi, K. B. Sundarambal, Ushanandini, Sivakumar, Manjula, Master Sridhar, V. K. Ramasamy, Manorama	Raman Pictures	
M A Y	17	Karunthel Kannayiram	R. Sundaram	Jaishankar, Lakshmi, A. Sakunthala, Thengai Srinivasan, Manorama	Modern Theatres	
M A Y	19	Kasethan Kadavulada	Chitralaya Gopu	R. Muthuraman, Lakshmi, Thengai Srinivasan, Srikanth, Manorama, Vennira Aadai Moorthy, Rama Prabha, Suruli Rajan, Jayakumari	AVM Productions	
M A Y	26	Kanimuthu Paappa	S. P. Muthuraman	Jaishankar, R. Muthuraman, Lakshmi, Jaya, Baby Sridevi	Sri Navaneedha Films	
J U N	3	Thiruneelakandar	Jambulingam	T. R. Mahalingam, Sowcar Janaki, R. S. Manohar, Pushpamala, Suruli Rajan, M. Bhanumathi	Sudarkodi Films	
J U N	9	Naan Yen Pirandhen	M. Krishnan	M. G. Ramachandran, K. R. Vijaya, Kanchana, Nagesh	Sri Kamakshi Agencies	
J U N	23	Pillaiyo Pillai	Krishnan–Panju	M. K. Muthu, Lakshmi, C. R. Vijayakumari, M. R. R. Vasu, Nagesh, Sachu	Anjugam Pictures	
J U N	29	Avasara Kalyanam	V. T. Thyagarajan	Jaishankar, Vanisri, Nagesh, Rama Prabha, V. K. Ramasamy	Subalakshmi Movies	
J U L	15	Dharmam Engey	A. C. Tirulokchandar	Sivaji Ganesan, Jayalalitha, R. Muthuraman, Nagesh, Kumari Padmini	Shanthi Films	
J U L	21	Kannamma	M. Lakshmanan	K. R. Vijaya, R. Muthuraman, Nagesh, K. Balaji, Jayakumari, M. N. Nambiar	Hema Chitra Productions	
J U L	21	Deiva Sankalpam	P. R. Somu	A. V. M. Rajan, C. R. Vijayakumari, T. S. Balaiah, S. Varalakshmi, Cho, Sachu, V. S. Raghavan, Major Sundarrajan	Sri Padmanabha Pictures	
A U G	4	Delhi To Madras	I. N. Murthy	Jaishankar, Srividya, R. Muthuraman, Nagesh, Vijayasree, M. A. Radhika, R. S. Manohar	Sri Raji Movies	
A U G	11	Velli Vizha	K. Balachander	Gemini Ganesan, Jayanthi, Vanisri, Srividya, Thengai Srinivasan, Manorama	Kalakendra Production	
A U G	15	Vazhaiyadi Vazhai	K. S. Gopalakrishnan	R. Muthuraman, Sriranjani, P. R. Varalakshmi (debut), Jayachitra, Prameela (debut)	Chitra Productions	
A U G	25	Varaverpu	I. N. Murthy	Jaishankar, Jaya Kausalya, J. P. Chandrababu, Thengai Srinivasan, Suruli Rajan, Rama Prabha, Jayakumari	Velavan Academy	
A U G	26	Thavapudhalavan	V. Srinivasan	Sivaji Ganesan, K. R. Vijaya, A. Sakunthala, Cho, Manorama	Muktha Films	
S E P	1	Bathilukku Bathil	Jambulingam	A. V. M. Rajan, R. Muthuraman, C. R. Vijayakumari, Vennira Aadai Nirmala, V.K. Ramasamy	Balan Combines	
S E P	9	Hello Partner	K. Krishnamurthy	Nagesh, Vijaya Lalitha, V. K. Ramasamy, Thengai Srinivasan, M. R. R. Vasu, Sachu	Sri Chithra Mahal	
S E P	14	Jakkamma	M. Karnan	Jaishankar, Savitri, Usharani, Thengai Srinivasan, Manorama, Master Selvam, Master Jagganathan	Vijaya Chitra Films	
S E P	15	Annamitta Kai	M. Krishnan	M. G. Ramachandran, Jayalalitha, Bharathi, Nagesh, Manorama	Ramachandra Production	
S E P	15	...Aval!	A. C. Tirulokchandar	Vennira Aadai Nirmala, A. V. M. Rajan, Shashikumar, J. P. Chandrababu, Manorama	Vijayalakshmi Pictures	
S E P	29	Vasantha Maligai	K. S. Prakash Rao	Sivaji Ganesan, Vanisri, K. Balaji, Srikanth, Nagesh Sundarrajan	Vijaya & Suresh Combines	
O C T	1	Unakkum Enakkum	N. S. Maniam	Jaishankar, Bharathi, Srividya, Cho, Manorama, Thengai Srinivasan	Geetha Chitra Productions	
O C T	18	Rahasiyapenn 117	Anuradha	Jaikumar	Sivaji Pictures	
O C T	20	Idhaya Veenai	Krishnan–Panju	M. G. Ramachandran, Manjula, Lakshmi, Sivakumar, Thengai Srinivasan, Sachu	Udhayam Productions	
N O V	4					
N O V	4	Annai Abirami	G. N. Velumani	K. R. Vijaya, Sivakumar, Jaya, Thengai Srinivasan, Manorama, Suruli Rajan	Sri Kamakshi Agencies	
N O V	4	Thangadurai	A. Kasilingam	A. V. M. Rajan, Sowcar Janaki, Master Sekhar	National Pictures	
N O V	4	Deivam	M. A. Thirumugam	Gemini Ganesan, K. R. Vijaya, A. V. M. Rajan, Sowcar Janaki, R. Muthuraman, Nagesh, Sivakumar, Jaya	Dhandayuthapani Films	
N O V	17	Mappillai Azhaippu	T. R. Raghunath	Jaishankar, Vijaya Lalitha, Nagesh, L. Kanchana, Vijaya Chandrika, Thengai Srinivasan	Om Murugan Movies	
D E C	1	Yaar Jambulingam	M. S. Gopinathan	Jaikumar, Jyothi Lakshmi	Sri Govindan Films	
D E C	7	Needhi	C. V. Rajendran	Sivaji Ganesan, Jayalalitha, Sowcar Janaki, Manorama, M. R. R. Vasu	Sujatha Cine Arts	
