= 1972 in film =

The year 1972 in film involved several significant events. Universal Pictures and Paramount Pictures celebrated their 60th anniversaries and the Motion Picture Association of America celebrated their 50th anniversary.

== Highest-grossing films (U.S.) ==
The top ten 1972 released films by box office gross in North America are as follows:

Highest-grossing films of 1972
Rank	Title	Distributor	Domestic rentals
1	The Godfather	Paramount	$86,300,000
2	The Poseidon Adventure	20th Century Fox	$42,000,000
3	What's Up, Doc?	Warner Bros.	$28,000,000
4	Deliverance	Warner Bros.	$22,500,000
5	Jeremiah Johnson	Warner Bros.	$21,900,000
6	Cabaret	Allied Artists	$20,250,000
7	Deep Throat	Bryanston	$20,000,000
8	The Getaway	National General	$18,000,000
9	Brother of the Wind	Sun International	$12,000,000
10	Lady Sings the Blues	Paramount	$9,666,000

== Awards ==
Category/Organization	30th Golden Globe Awards January 28, 1973		26th BAFTA Awards February 28, 1973	45th Academy Awards March 27, 1973
Category/Organization	Drama	Musical or Comedy	26th BAFTA Awards February 28, 1973	45th Academy Awards March 27, 1973
Best Film	The Godfather	Cabaret		The Godfather
Best Director	Francis Ford Coppola; The Godfather		Bob Fosse; Cabaret	
Best Actor	Marlon Brando; The Godfather	Jack Lemmon; Avanti!	Gene Hackman; The Poseidon Adventure; The French Connection	Marlon Brando; The Godfather
Best Actress	Liv Ullmann; The Emigrants	Liza Minnelli; Cabaret		
Best Supporting Actor	Joel Grey; Cabaret		Ben Johnson; The Last Picture Show	Joel Grey; Cabaret
Best Supporting Actress	Shelley Winters; The Poseidon Adventure		Cloris Leachman; The Last Picture Show	Eileen Heckart; Butterflies Are Free
Best Screenplay, Adapted	Francis Ford Coppola and Mario Puzo; The Godfather		Paddy Chayefsky; The Hospital; Peter Bogdanovich and Larry McMurtry; The Last Picture Show	Francis Ford Coppola and Mario Puzo; The Godfather
Best Screenplay, Original	Francis Ford Coppola and Mario Puzo; The Godfather		Paddy Chayefsky; The Hospital; Peter Bogdanovich and Larry McMurtry; The Last Picture Show	Jeremy Larner; The Candidate
Best Original Score	Nino Rota; The Godfather			Charlie Chaplin, Raymond Rasch and Larry Russell; Limelight; Ralph Burns; Cabaret
Best Original Song	"Ben"; Ben		N/A	"The Morning After"; The Poseidon Adventure
Best Foreign Language Film	The Emigrants; The New Land		N/A	The Discreet Charm of the Bourgeoisie

Palme d'Or (Cannes Film Festival):

The Working Class Goes to Heaven (La classe operaia va in paradiso), directed by Elio Petri, Italy
The Mattei Affair (Il Caso Mattei), directed by Francesco Rosi, Italy

Golden Bear (Berlin Film Festival):

The Canterbury Tales (I Racconti di Canterbury), directed by Pier Paolo Pasolini, Italy / France

== 1972 films ==
=== By country/region ===
- List of American films of 1972
- List of Argentine films of 1972
- List of Australian films of 1972
- List of Bangladeshi films of 1972
- List of British films of 1972
- List of Canadian films of 1972
- List of French films of 1972
- List of Hong Kong films of 1972
- List of Indian films of 1972
  - List of Hindi films of 1972
  - List of Kannada films of 1972
  - List of Malayalam films of 1972
  - List of Marathi films of 1972
  - List of Tamil films of 1972
  - List of Telugu films of 1972
- List of Italian films of 1972
- List of Japanese films of 1972
- List of Mexican films of 1972
- List of Pakistani films of 1972
- List of South Korean films of 1972
- List of Soviet films of 1972
- List of Spanish films of 1972

=== By genre/medium ===
- List of action films of 1972
- List of animated feature films of 1972
- List of avant-garde films of 1972
- List of comedy films of 1972
- List of drama films of 1972
- List of horror films of 1972
- List of science fiction films of 1972
- List of thriller films of 1972
- List of western films of 1972

== Births ==
- January 5
  - Simona Caparrini, Italian actress
  - Luciana Pedraza, Argentine actress and director
- January 9 – Deon Cole, American actor
- January 11
  - Marc Blucas, American actor
  - Konstantin Khabensky, Russian actor and director
  - Amanda Peet, American actress
- January 12 - Zabryna Guevara, American actress
- January 15 – Kobe Tai, Taiwanese-American actress
- January 16 - Richard T. Jones, American actor
- January 17 - Benno Fürmann, German actor
- January 20 - Adrian Martinez, American actor and comedian
- January 22
  - Gabriel Macht, American actor
  - Romi Park, Japanese actress and singer
- January 23 -
  - Léa Drucker, French actress
  - Ewen Bremner, Scottish character actor
- January 26 - Cyia Batten, American dancer, model and actress
- January 28
  - Peter McDonald, Irish actor and director
  - Gillian Vigman, American actress, comedian and screenwriter
- February 1 - Tego Calderón, Puerto Rican rapper, singer and actor
- February 6 - Richard Coyle, English actor
- February 7 - Robyn Lively, American actress
- February 8 - Guillaume Gallienne, French actor, screenwriter and director
- February 9
  - Crispin Freeman, American voice actor
  - Darwin Shaw, British actor and director
- February 12 - Ajay Naidu, American actor and director
- February 14 - T.J. Storm, American actor, stuntman and martial artist
- February 16 - Sarah Clarke, American actress
- February 20 – Gareth Unwin, English producer
- February 24 - James Bachman, English comedian, actor and writer
- February 26
  - Keith Ferguson, American voice actor
  - Maz Jobrani, American comedian and actor
- February 28 - Rory Cochrane, American actor
- March 3 - Christian Oliver, German actor
- March 4 – Garth Jennings, English film director, screenwriter, producer, actor and writer
- March 8 - Matt Nable, Australian actor and writer
- March 9
  - Jean Louisa Kelly, American actress and singer
  - Kerr Smith, American actor
- March 11 - Jamal Duff, American actor
- March 13 – Common, American actor and singer
- March 16 - Nicolas Bro, Danish actor
- March 18 – Dane Cook, American comedian
- March 23 – Judith Godrèche, French actress
- March 24
  - Charlie Creed-Miles, English actor and musician
  - Tony Leondis, Greek-American animator, filmmaker and voice actor
- March 26 – Leslie Mann, American actress
- March 28
  - Nick Frost, English actor, comedian, writer and producer
  - David Vadim, Ukrainian-born American actor
  - Ledisi, American singer-songwriter and actress
- March 29 - Sam Hazeldine, English actor
- March 31 – Alejandro Amenábar, Spanish director, writer and soundtrack composer
- April 1
  - Albert Hughes, American filmmaker
  - Allen Hughes, American filmmaker
- April 2 - Stephen Saux, American actor
- April 3 - Catherine McCormack, English actress
- April 5 - Junko Takeuchi, Japanese actress and voice actress
- April 6 - Jason Hervey, American actor and producer
- April 8 - Sung Kang, American actor
- April 10 - Vincent Zhao, Chinese actor and martial artist
- April 15 - Lou Romano, American animator and voice actor
- April 17 – Jennifer Garner, American actress
- April 18
  - Maurice Compte, American actor
  - Eli Roth, American director, screenwriter, producer and actor
- April 20 - Carmen Electra, American actress, singer and model
- April 21 - Liz Carr, English actress and comedian
- April 26 - Bronagh Gallagher, Irish actress and singer
- April 27 - David Lascher, American actor
- April 28 - Gabriel Casseus, American actor and screenwriter
- April 29 – Derek Mears, American actor and stuntman
- May 1 - Julie Benz, American actress
- May 2 – Dwayne Johnson, American actor
- May 3 - Joe Pingue, Canadian actor and filmmaker
- May 4 - John Rawls, New Zealand actor
- May 7 - Jennifer Yuh Nelson, South Korean-born American story artist and director
- May 10 - Cary Guffey, American former child actor
- May 12
  - Christian Campbell, Canadian actor
  - Rhea Seehorn, American actress and director
- May 14
  - Gabriel Mann, American actor and model
  - Ben Weber, American actor
- May 15
  - Ashley McGuire, British actress
  - Tom Wu, Hong Kong-born British actor
- May 16 - Khary Payton, American actor
- May 20 - Busta Rhymes, American rapper and actor
- May 21 - Olga Sosnovska, Polish actress
- May 22
  - Max Brooks, American actor
  - Alison Eastwood, American director and actress
- May 25 - Karan Johar, Indian director
- May 26 - Selenis Leyva, American actress
- May 28
  - Kate Ashfield, English actress
  - Chiara Mastroianni, French actress
  - Roland Møller, Danish actor
- May 29 - Laverne Cox, American actress
- May 30 - Joachim Rønning, Norwegian director
- May 31 - Archie Panjabi, British actress
- June 1 - Rick Gomez, American actor
- June 2
  - Wayne Brady, American actor, comedian, producer and game show host
  - Wentworth Miller, American-British actor and screenwriter
- June 7 – Karl Urban, New Zealand actor
- June 16 - John Cho, American actor
- June 19
  - Jean Dujardin, French actor
  - Robin Tunney, American actress
- June 23 – Selma Blair, American actress
- June 28
  - Brendan Hunt, American actor and writer
  - Alessandro Nivola, American actor
- June 30 - Molly Parker, Canadian actress, writer and director
- July 3 - Matt Schulze, American actor and musician
- July 4 - Claire Price, English actress
- July 5 – Gilles Lellouche, French actor and director
- July 7 - Heather Kafka, American actress
- July 10
  - Christoph Hochhäusler, German film director and screenwriter
  - Peter Serafinowicz, English actor, comedian, director and screenwriter
  - Sofia Vergara, Colombian American actress, television producer, presenter and model
  - John Viener, American actor, voice actor, writer and comedian
- July 11 - Michael Rosenbaum, American actor, director, producer, singer and comedian
- July 12 – Nenad Jezdić, Serbian actor
- July 14 - Deborah Mailman, Australian actress and singer
- July 15
  - Liza Colón-Zayas, American actress
  - Scott Foley, American actor, director and screenwriter
- July 23 - Marlon Wayans, American actor, comedian, writer and producer
- July 26 - Spencer Wilding, Welsh actor and stuntman
- July 27 – Maya Rudolph, American actress and comedian
- July 28
  - Elizabeth Berkley, American actress
  - Evan Farmer, American actor and musician
- July 29
  - Ato Essandoh, American actor
  - Wil Wheaton, American actor
- August 1
  - Guri Weinberg, Israeli-American actor and writer
  - Charles Malik Whitfield, American actor
- August 2 - Jacinda Barrett, Australian-American actress
- August 5
  - Darren Shahlavi, English actor, martial artist and stuntman (d. 2015)
  - Reika Kirishima, Japanese actress
- August 7
  - Dan Payne, Canadian actor
  - Greg Serano, American actor
- August 9 - Ryan Bollman, American actor
- August 10 - Angie Harmon, American actress
- August 13 - Michael Sinterniklaas, French voice actor
- August 15
  - Ben Affleck, American actor, director and writer
  - Matthew Wood, American sound editor and voice actor
- August 24 - Ava DuVernay, American filmmaker, screenwriter and producer
- August 25
  - Scarlett Chorvat, American actress
  - Joe Wright, English director
- August 30 – Cameron Diaz, American actress
- September 4
  - Carlos Ponce, Puerto Rican actor, musician, model and television personality
  - Françoise Yip, Canadian actress
- September 6
  - Dylan Bruno, American actor
  - Idris Elba, English actor
  - Justina Machado, American actress
  - Mait Malmsten, Estonian actor
  - Anika Noni Rose, American actress and singer
- September 7 – Matthew Sleeth, Australian director
- September 8
  - Giovanni Frezza, Italian child actor
  - Tomokazu Seki, Japanese voice actor
- September 9
  - Adam James, English actor
  - Goran Visnjic, Croatian-American actor
- September 13 - Kyle Rankin, American screenwriter and filmmaker
- September 14 - Nakamura Shidō II, Japanese actor
- September 15 - John Schwab, American actor
- September 16
  - Mike Doyle, American actor
  - Alex Rice, Aboriginal-Canadian actress
- September 21
  - Kevin Downes, American actor, writer, producer and director
  - Erin Fitzgerald, Canadian voice actress
- September 24
  - Kate Fleetwood, English actress
  - Finty Williams, English actress
- September 26 - Melanie Paxson, American actress
- September 27 – Gwyneth Paltrow, American actress
- September 29 - Robert Webb, English comedian, actor and writer
- October 5 - Tom Hooper, British-Australian filmmaker
- October 8
  - Enrique Arce, Spanish actor
  - Tricia Vessey, American actress, writer and producer
- October 9 - Cocoa Brown, American actress, writer and comedian
- October 11 - Claudia Black, Australian actress
- October 12 - Sönke Möhring, German actor
- October 15 - Matt Keeslar, American former actor
- October 17 – Eminem, American rapper and actor
- October 18 - Christopher Knights, English voice actor, editor and cinematographer
- October 20 - Thor Freudenthal, German director, screenwriter, animator and special effects artist
- October 21 - Masakazu Morita, Japanese actor, voice actor and singer
- October 22 – Saffron Burrows, English-American actress
- October 23 - Kate del Castillo, Mexican-American actress
- October 29 - Gabrielle Union, American actress, voice artist, activist and author
- October 30
  - David Wilson Barnes, American actor (died 2025)
  - Jessica Hynes, English actress, director and writer
  - Steve Monroe, American actor and stand-up comedian
- October 31 - Assaf Cohen, American actor
- November 1
  - Toni Collette, Australian actress, producer and singer-songwriter
  - Jenny McCarthy, American actress
- November 2 - Steve Edge, English actor, writer and former comedian
- November 6
  - Thandiwe Newton, English actress
  - Rebecca Romijn, American actress
- November 7
  - Christopher Daniel Barnes, American actor and writer
  - Jeremy and Jason London, American actors
- November 8
  - Gretchen Mol, American actress
  - Jason Matthew Smith, American actor
- November 9 - Eric Dane, American actor (died 2026)
- November 10 - Trevor Devall, Canadian voice actor and podcaster
- November 11
  - Adam Beach, Canadian actor
  - Tyler Christopher, American actor (d. 2023)
- November 13 - Takuya Kimura, Japanese actor, singer and radio personality
- November 14 – Josh Duhamel, American actor
- November 15 – Jonny Lee Miller, English actor
- November 16
  - Mohammad Rasoulof, Iranian independent filmmaker
  - Michael Irby, American actor
- November 17 - Leonard Roberts, American actor
- November 19
  - Nicole Forester, American actress
  - Sandrine Holt, British-born Canadian actress
- November 21 - Rain Phoenix, American actress, musician and singer
- November 26 – Arjun Rampal, Indian actor
- November 28 - Michael Blackson, Ghanaian actor and comedian
- November 29 - Brian Baumgartner, American actor
- December 2 - Trond Fausa Aurvåg, Norwegian actor and director
- December 4 - Yūko Miyamura, Japanese actress and voice actress
- December 7 – Jennifer Syme, American entertainment industry employee (d. 2001)
- December 9 - Reiko Aylesworth, American actress
- December 11 - Rusty Joiner, American actor
- December 14
  - Jason Barry, Irish actor
  - Isabelle de Hertogh, Belgian actress
  - Miranda Hart, English actress, comedian and writer
- December 15 – Stuart Townsend, Irish actor
- December 16 - Lisa Spoonauer, American former character actress (d. 2017)
- December 18 - Jason Mantzoukas, American character actor, comedian, writer and podcaster.
- December 19 – Alyssa Milano, American actress
- December 20 - Marc Silk, English voice actor
- December 22 - Poorna Jagannathan, American producer and actress
- December 23 – Christian Potenza, Canadian actor and voice actor
- December 24 – Carmen Moore, Canadian actress
- December 25 - Patrick Brennan, American actor
- December 26 – Shane Meadows, English independent film director
- December 27
  - Brandon Auret, South African actor
  - Thomas Wilson Brown, American actor
- December 28 - Supakorn Kitsuwon, Thai actor
- December 29
  - Jude Law, English actor
  - Leonor Varela, Chilean actress

== Deaths ==
Month
Date
Name
Age
Country
Profession
Notable films
January
1
Maurice Chevalier
83
France
Actor, Singer
- Gigi
- Can-Can
8
Wesley Ruggles
82
US
Director, Producer
- I'm No Angel
- Arizona
17
Rochelle Hudson
55
US
Actress
- Rebel Without a Cause
- Les Miserables
18
George Mitchell
66
US
Actor
- The Andromeda Strain
- Kid Galahad
19
Richard Fraser
58
Scotland
Actor
- The Picture of Dorian Gray
- The Fatal Witness
22
Alec Coppel
64
Australia
Screenwriter
- The Captain's Paradise
- Vertigo
24
Jerome Cowan
74
US
Actor
- The Maltese Falcon
- Miracle on 34th Street
27
Herbert Hübner
82
Germany
Actor
- Storm in a Water Glass
- Robert and Bertram
29
Hugh McDermott
65
Scotland
Actor
- David Livingstone
- Devil Girl from Mars
February
2
Jessie Royce Landis
75
US
Actress
- North by Northwest
- To Catch a Thief
7
Walter Lang
75
US
Director
- The King and I
- The Little Princess
19
John Grierson
73
Scotland
Director, Producer
- The Song of Ceylon
- The Brave Don't Cry
20
Walter Winchell
74
US
Commentator
- Wake Up and Live
- Love and Hisses
21
Bronislava Nijinska
64
Poland
Choreographer
- A Midsummer Night's Dream
March
3
Harold Young
74
US
Director, Editor
- The Scarlet Pimpernel
- The Mummy's Tomb
19
Albert Mannheimer
59
US
Screenwriter
- Born Yesterday
- Bloodhounds of Broadway
20
Marilyn Maxwell
51
US
Actress
- Champion
- The Lemon Drop Kid
29
J. Arthur Rank
83
England
Executive
- So Well Remembered
- Quartet
29
Hal Roach Jr.
53
US
Director, Producer
- One Million B.C.
30
Peter Whitney
55
US
Actor
- The Big Heat
- In the Heat of the Night
April
5
Brian Donlevy
71
Ireland
Actor
- Kiss of Death
- Wake Island
5
Isabel Jewell
64
US
Actress
- Gone with the Wind
- Lost Horizon
7
Betty Blythe
78
US
Actress
- The Queen of Sheba
- She
13
Dorothy Dalton
78
US
Actress
- Behind Masks
- The Woman Who Walked Alone
20
Jorge Mistral
51
Spain
Actor
- Andalusia Express
- The White Sister
25
George Sanders
65
England
Actor
- All About Eve
- Rebecca
25
Alfred J. Goulding
87
Australia
Director
- Step Lively
- A Chump at Oxford
27
Bobby Howes
76
England
Producer, Director
- Sweet Devil
- Yes, Madam?
28
Harry Joe Brown
81
US
Producer, Director
- Captain Blood
- Knickerbocker Holiday
30
Gia Scala
38
England
Actor
- The Guns of Navarone
- Don't Go Near the Water
May
3
Bruce Cabot
68
US
Actor
- King Kong
- Diamonds Are Forever
4
Elsa Ratassepp
79
Estonia
Actress
Libahunt

5
Frank Tashlin
59
US
Director
- Son of Paleface
- Artists and Models
7
Henri Diamant-Berger
76
France
Director, producer, screenwriter
- Les Trois Mousquetaires
- Monsieur Fabre
12
Steve Ihnat
37
Czechoslovakia
Actor
- Madigan
- Zig Zag
13
Dan Blocker
43
US
Actor
- Lady in Cement
- Come Blow Your Horn
15
Nigel Green
47
South Africa
Actor
- The Ipcress File
- Zulu
18
Sidney Franklin
79
US
Director, Producer
- Duel in the Sun
- The Good Earth
22
Margaret Rutherford
80
England
Actress
- The V.I.P.s
- Murder, She Said
23
Richard Day
76
Canada
Art director
- How Green Was My Valley
- On the Waterfront
24
Asta Nielsen
90
Denmark
Actress
- Hamlet: The Drama of Vengeance
- Impossible Love
25
Charles C. Coleman
70
US
Director
- Homicide Bureau
- The Shadow
June
17
Jean Brochard
79
France
Actor
- The Law Is the Law
- Les Diaboliques
17
Gale Henry
79
US
Actress
- Two-Time Mama
- Darkened Rooms
20
Sidney Lanfield
74
US
Director
- The Hound of the Baskervilles
- The Lemon Drop Kid
22
Paul Czinner
82
Hungary
Director, screenwriter
- Dreaming Lips
- Ariane, jeune fille russe
25
Nicholas Hannen
74
England
Director
- The Dictator
- Richard III
27
Thomy Bourdelle
81
France
Actor
- The Return of Don Camillo
- The Call of Silence
July
3
Hal Walker
76
US
Director
- Sailor Beware
- At War with the Army
6
Brandon deWilde
30
US
Actor
- Shane
- Hud
10
Emrys Jones
56
England
Actor
- One of Our Aircraft Is Missing
- Nicholas Nickleby
10
Harmon Jones
61
Canada
Director
- Pride of St. Louis
- The Kid from Left Field
19
Sally Benson
74
US
Screenwriter
- Shadow of a Doubt
- Viva Las Vegas
28
Helen Traubel
73
US
Actress, Singer
- Deep in My Heart
- The Ladies Man
August
7
Joi Lansing
43
US
Actress
- Touch of Evil
- A Hole in the Head
7
Tom Neal
58
US
Actor
- Jungle Girl
- Detour
14
Oscar Levant
65
US
Actor
- An American in Paris
- The Band Wagon
16
Pierre Brasseur
66
France
Actor
- Les Enfants du Paradis
- Eyes Without a Face
19
Roger Furse
68
England
Costume and production designer
- Henry V
- Hamlet
24
D. Ross Lederman
77
US
Director
- Key Witness
- The Body Disappears
27
Gaby André
52
France
Actress
- Verdi, the King of Melody
- Highway 301
September
11
Max Fleischer
89
US
Animator, Director, Producer
- Popeye the Sailor
- Betty Boop for President
12
William Boyd
77
US
Actor
- Hop-Along Cassidy
- The Volga Boatman
14
Lane Chandler
73
US
Actor
- Open Range
- The Cheyenne Cyclone
17
Akim Tamiroff
72
Russia
Actor
- Touch of Evil
- Ocean's 11
29
Max Nosseck
70
Germany
Director
- Black Beauty
- Dillinger
29
Edward Sloman
86
US
Actor
- Gun Smoke
- The Lost Zeppelin
30
Edgar G. Ulmer
68
Austria
Director
- The Black Cat
- Detour
October
4
Colin Gordon
61
England
Actor
- The Pink Panther
- Casino Royale
9
Miriam Hopkins
69
US
Actress
- Trouble in Paradise
- Dr. Jekyll and Mr. Hyde
16
Leo G. Carroll
85
England
Actor
- North by Northwest
- Strangers on a Train
22
Jack Melford
73
England
Actor
- A Shot in the Dark
- Lust for a Vampire
24
Claire Windsor
80
US
Actor
- The Blot
- Captain Lash
28
Mitchell Leisen
74
US
Director
- Midnight
- Kitty
November
5
Reginald Owen
85
England
Actor
- Mary Poppins
- A Christmas Carol
7
Tod Andrews
57
Russia
Actor
- From Hell It Came
- Beneath the Planet of the Apes
10
Francis Chagrin
66
Romania
Composer
- The Intruder
- The Colditz Story
16
Vera Karalli
83
Russia
Actress
- A Woman's Revenge
- The King of Paris
23
Marie Wilson
56
US
Actress
- Mr. Hobbs Takes a Vacation
- My Friend Irma
29
Eve Southern
72
US
Actress
- Clothes Make the Woman
- Morocco (film)
30
William P. S. Earle
89
US
Director
- The Way of a Maid
- Love's Masquerade
December
6
Janet Munro
38
England
Actress
- Swiss Family Robinson
- Darby O'Gill and the Little People
9
William Dieterle
79
Germany
Director
- The Life of Emile Zola
- The Story of Louis Pasteur
9
Louella Parsons
91
US
Columnist, Screenwriter
- Hollywood Hotel
- Starlift
15
Edward Earle
90
Canada
Actor
- The Law of the Yukon
- Spite Marriage
19
Jacques Deval
77
France
Director, Screenwriter
- Women's Club
- Tovaritch

== Film debuts ==
- Anne Archer – The Honkers
- Victor Argo – Dealing: Or the Berkeley-to-Boston Forty-Brick Lost-Bag Blues
- William Atherton – The New Centurions
- Margaret Avery – Cool Breeze
- Ray Baker – Parades
- Elya Baskin – Telegramma
- Emmanuelle Béart – And Hope to Die
- Ned Beatty – Deliverance
- Susan Blakely – Savages
- Klaus Maria Brandauer – The Salzburg Connection
- Jerry Bruckheimer (producer) – The Culpepper Cattle Co.
- Robert Carradine – The Cowboys
- Dominic Chianese – Fuzz
- Candy Clark – Fat City
- Allan Corduner – Savage Messiah
- Ronny Cox – Deliverance
- Charles Cyphers – Cool Breeze
- Blythe Danner – To Kill a Clown
- Phil Davis – The Canterbury Tales
- Brian Doyle-Murray – Fuzz
- Steve Eastin – Joe Kidd
- Art Evans – Sisters
- James Faulkner – The Great Waltz
- Peter Firth – Brother Sun, Sister Moon
- Jodie Foster – Napoleon and Samantha
- Jackie Earle Haley – The Outside Man
- Bill Henderson – Trouble Man
- David Hess – The Last House on the Left
- Bob Hoskins – Up the Front
- Isabelle Huppert – Faustine et le Bel Été
- Samuel L. Jackson – Together for Days
- Madeline Kahn – What's Up, Doc?
- Patsy Kensit – For the Love of Ada
- Ben Kingsley – Fear Is the Key
- Ed Lauter – Dirty Little Billy
- Floyd Levine – Come Back, Charleston Blue
- John Lithgow – Dealing: Or the Berkeley-to-Boston Forty-Brick Lost-Bag Blues
- David Margulies – Scarecrow in a Garden of Cucumbers
- Steve Martin – Another Nice Mess
- Macon McCalman – Deliverance
- Frank McRae – Cool Breeze
- Nick Nolte – Dirty Little Billy
- Michele Placido – Il caso Pisciotta
- Jürgen Prochnow – Zoff
- Kathleen Quinlan – One Is a Lonely Number
- Steve Railsback – The Visitors
- Alan Silvestri (film composer) – The Doberman Gang
- Stellan Skarsgård – Strandhugg i somras
- Svetlana Smirnova – Koltsa Almanzora
- Charles Martin Smith – The Culpepper Cattle Co.
- Joe Spinell – The Godfather
- Brinke Stevens – Necromancy
- Kemal Sunal – Sweet Talker
- Jeffrey Tambor – The Summertime Killer
- Lily Tomlin – Scarecrow in a Garden of Cucumbers
- James Woods – The Visitors
- George Wyner – Lady Sings the Blues

== See also ==
- List of Hong Kong films of 1972
