= 24th Filmfare Awards South =

Award ceremony for South Indian films

- Date: 14 August 1977
- Site: Chennai

The 24th Filmfare Awards South ceremony honoring the winners of the best of South Indian cinema in 1976 was held on August 14, 1977, at Kalaivanar Arangam in Madras.

The president of this year's function was Andhra Pradesh Governor Sharda Mukherjee. The chief guest of the evening was South Indian Film Chamber of Commerce President D. V. S. Raju.

== Awards ==
=== Kannada cinema ===
Best Film	Best Director
Thulasi - K. N. Subbaiah	G. V. Iyer - Hamsageethe
Best Actor	Best Actress
Srinath - Besuge	Jayanthi - Thulasi

=== Malayalam cinema ===
Best Film	Best Director
Mohiniyaattam - Ragamalika	Sreekumaran Thampi - Mohiniyaattam
Best Actor	Best Actress
Madhu - Theekkanal	Lakshmi - Mohiniyaattam

=== Tamil cinema ===
Best Film	Best Director
Annakili - S. P. Thamizharasi	S. P. Muthuraman - Oru Oodhappu Kan Simittugiradhu
Best Actor	Best Actress
Kamal Haasan - Oru Oodhappu Kan Simittugiradhu	Sujatha - Annakili

=== Telugu cinema ===
Best Film	Best Director
Soggadu - D. Ramanaidu	Bapu - Seetha Kalyanam
Best Actor	Best Actress
Sobhan Babu - Soggadu	Jayasudha - Jyothi

=== Special awards ===
Special Award for excellent performances of the year
- Jayapradha - Siri Siri Muvva & Anthuleni Katha
- Gummadi - Jyothi
- Prem Nazir for Various films

Special Commendation Award
- K. G. George - Swapnadanam

== Awards presentation ==
- K. G. George (Special Award) Received Award from Vidhubala
- Jayapradha (Special Award) Received Award from Zarina Wahab
- Gummadi (Special Award) Received Award from Raja Sulochana
- Prem Nazir (Special Award) Received Award from Sheela
- K. N. Subbiah (Best Film Kannada) Received Award from Ramakrishna
- G. V. Iyer (Best Director Kannada) Received Award from S. R. Puttanna Kanagal
- Jayanthi (Best Actress Kannada) Received Award from Krishnam Raju
- Srinath (Best Actor Kannada)Received Award from Thikkurissy Sukumaran Nair
- Mrs. Raji Thampi (Best Film Malayalam) Received Award from Vijayakumar
- Sreekumaran Thampi (Best Director Malayalam) Received Award from Sowcar Janaki
- Lakshmi (Best Actress Malayalam) Received Award from D. V. S. Raju
- Madhu (Best Actor Malayalam) Received Award from Jayalakshmi
- D. Rama Naidu (Best Film Telugu) Received Award from Vidya Sinha
- Bapu (Best Director Telugu) Received Award from Jayachitra
- Jayasudha (Best Actress Telugu) Received Award from B. R. Chopra
- Sobhan Babu (Best Actor Telugu) Received Award from Sharada Mukherjee
- S. K. Subbu (Best Film Tamil) Received Award from Nirmala
- S. P. Muthuraman (Best Director Tamil) Received Award from Manjula
- Sujatha (Best Actress Tamil) Received Award from Amol Palekar
- Kamal Haasan (Best Actor Tamil) Received Award from Gemini Ganesan
