= List of Telugu films of 1972 =

This is a list of Telugu-language films produced in the year 1972.

Title	Director	Cast	Source
Antha Mana Manchike	Bhanumathi Ramakrishna	Bhanumathi, Krishna, Nagabhushanam	
Badi Panthulu	P. Chandrasekhara Reddy	N. T. Rama Rao, Anjali Devi	
Bala Bharatam	Kamalakara Kameshwara Rao	Baby Sridevi, Anjali Devi	
Bala Mitrula Katha			
Bandipotu			
Beedala Patlu	B. Vittalacharya	ANR, Krishna Kumari	
Bhale Mosagadu		Krishna	
Bharya Biddalu	T. Ramarao	ANR, Jayalalitha, Krishna Kumari, Sridevi	
Datta Putrudu	T. Lenin Babu	ANR, Vanisri	
Guduputani	P. Lakshmi Deepak	Krishna, Shubha	
Hantakulu Devantakulu		Krishna	
Illu Illalu		Krishna, Vanisri	
Inspector Bharya		Krishna, Chandrakala	
Kalam Marindi	K. Viswanath	Gummadi, Anjali Devi, Shobhan Babu, Sharada	
Koduku Kodalu	P. Pullaiah	ANR, Vanisri	
Kula Gowravam	Peketi Sivaram	NTR, Jayanthi, Aarathi	
Manavudu Danavudu	P. Chandrasekhara Reddy	Shobhan Babu, Sharada	
Manchi Rojulu Vachchaayi	V. Madhusudan Rao	ANR Kanchana	
Mathru Murthy?			
Muhammad Bin Tuglak		Nagabhushanam, S. P. Balasubrahmanyam	
Neeti-Nijayiti	Singeetam Srinivasa Rao	Krishnam Raju, Kanchana	
Pandanti Kapuram	Lakshmi Deepak	Jamuna, B.Saroja Devi, Krishna, Vijaya nirmala, Jayasudha	
Papam Pasivadu	V. Ramachandra Rao		
Raitu Kutumbam	T. Rama Rao	ANR, Kanchana	
Raj Mahal		Krishna, Krishnam Raju	
Sabhash Baby?			
Sabhash Vadina			
Sri Krishnanjaneya Yuddham	C. S. Rao	NTR, Devika, Vanisri	
Vichitra Bandham	Adurthi Subba Rao	ANR, Vanisri	
Vinta Dampatulu	K. Hemabandhara Rao	Nagabhushanam	
Vooriki Vupakari		Chalam, Kannada Aarathi	
