= Kalyana Photo =

Indian film

- Poster
- Directed by: J. D. Thottan
- Written by: Chempil John; S. L. Puram Sadanandan (dialogues)
- Screenplay by: S. L. Puram Sadanandan
- Produced by: T. E. Vasudevan
- Starring: Madhu; Adoor Bhasi; Muthukulam Raghavan Pillai; P. A. Thomas
- Edited by: T. R. Sreenivasalu
- Music by: K. Raghavan
- Production company: Jaya Maruthi
- Distributed by: Jaya Maruthi
- Release date: 30 April 1965
- Country: India
- Language: Malayalam

Kalyana Photo (transl. Marriage Photo) is a 1965 Indian Malayalam film, directed by J. D. Thottan and produced by T. E. Vasudevan. The film stars Madhu, Adoor Bhasi, Muthukulam Raghavan Pillai and P. A. Thomas in the lead roles. The film had musical score by K. Raghavan.

== Cast ==
- Madhu
- Adoor Bhasi
- Muthukulam Raghavan Pillai
- Kumari Padmini
- P. A. Thomas
- Kamaladevi
- Kochappan
- Kottarakkara Sreedharan Nair
- Nirmala
- Philomina

== Soundtrack ==
The music was composed by K. Raghavan and the lyrics were written by Vayalar Ramavarma.

No.	Song	Singers	Lyrics	Length (m:ss)
1	"Innaleyum Njaan Orale"	L. R. Eeswari	Vayalar Ramavarma	
2	"Kaalvari Malakkupokum"	P. Leela	Vayalar Ramavarma	
3	"Konchi Kunungi"	K. J. Yesudas, P. Leela	Vayalar Ramavarma	
4	"Mayilaadum Kunninmel"	L. R. Eeswari	Vayalar Ramavarma	
5	"Omanathinkal Kidaavurangu"	P. Leela	Vayalar Ramavarma	
6	"Pavizhamuthinu Pono"	P. Leela	Vayalar Ramavarma	
7	"Thappo Thappo Thappaani"	Gomathy, Renuka	Vayalar Ramavarma	
