= Kattupookkal =

- Directed by: K. Thankappan
- Written by: Ponkunnam Varkey
- Screenplay by: Ponkunnam Varkey
- Produced by: K. Thankappan
- Starring: Madhu; Adoor Bhasi; Thikkurissy Sukumaran Nair; Devika
- Cinematography: R. N. Pillai
- Edited by: K. B. Singh
- Music by: G. Devarajan
- Production company: Giri Movies
- Distributed by: Giri Movies
- Release date: 3 September 1965
- Country: India
- Language: Malayalam

Kattupookkal is a 1965 Indian Malayalam-language film, directed and produced by K. Thankappan. The film stars Madhu, Adoor Bhasi, Thikkurissy Sukumaran Nair and Devika. G. Devarajan composed the music.

== Cast ==
- Madhu as Dr. Johny
- Adoor Bhasi
- Thikkurissy Sukumaran Nair as Thomachan
- Devika as Anni
- Chithradevi as Mery
- Jayanthi
- O. Madhavan as Lonachan
- Paravoor Bharathan as Kariyachan
- Manavalan Joseph as Insurance Agent
- Nellikode Bhaskaran
- Philomina
- S. P. Pillai
- Kumari Padmini as Kamalam
- Sujatha
- Adoor Pankajam
- Shanthapriya
- Nilambur Ayisha
- Kottayam Chellappan as Priest
- Mathew
- Master Suresh as Venu
- Uthaman
- John
- Kalakkal Kumaran
- Vijaya Kumari

== Soundtrack ==
The music was composed by G. Devarajan and the lyrics were written by O. N. V. Kurup.

No.	Song	Singers	Lyrics	Length (m:ss)
1	"Anthithiriyum"	P. Susheela	O. N. V. Kurup	
2	"Athappoo Chithirappoo"	P. Susheela	O. N. V. Kurup	
3	"Deepam Kaattuka"	P. Leela, Gomathy, L. R. Anjali	O. N. V. Kurup	
4	"Kaattupookkal Njangal"	P. Leela, Chorus	O. N. V. Kurup	
5	"Maanikyaveenayumaay"	K. J. Yesudas	O. N. V. Kurup	
6	"Puzhavakkil Pullanimetil"	G. Devarajan, P. Leela, L. R. Anjali	O. N. V. Kurup	
