= Anbu Sagodharargal =

- Poster
- Directed by: Lakshmi Deepak
- Screenplay by: Lakshmi Deepak
- Story by: M. Prabhakar Reddy
- Produced by: N. Kanagasabai; Jayanthi Films (Madurai)
- Starring: Jaishankar; S. V. Ranga Rao; Jamuna; Major Sundarrajan; A. V. M. Rajan; Devika; Vennira Aadai Nirmala; Prameela
- Cinematography: V. Ramamoorthy
- Edited by: Kotagiri Gopal Rao
- Music by: K. V. Mahadevan
- Production company: Jayanthi Films
- Release date: 4 May 1973
- Running time: 176 minutes
- Country: India
- Language: Tamil

Anbu Sagodharargal (transl. Dear Brothers) is a 1973 Indian Tamil-language film directed by Lakshmi Deepak. It is a remake of the director's own Telugu film Pandanti Kapuram. The film stars Jaishankar, S. V. Ranga Rao, Jamuna, Major Sundarrajan, Devika, A. V. M. Rajan, Prameela and Vennira Aadai Nirmala. It was released on 4 May 1973.

== Cast ==
- S. V. Ranga Rao as Dharmaraj
- Major Sundarrajan as Selvaraj
- A. V. M. Rajan as Durairaj
- Jaishankar as Prem
- Jamuna as Rani Malini Devi/Kamala
- Devika
- Prameela
- Vennira Aadai Nirmala
- Cho as Gopi
- V. K. Ramasamy
- Manorama
- Srikanth as Prakash
- Roja Ramani
- V. S. Raghavan

== Soundtrack ==
The music was composed by K. V. Mahadevan.

Song	Singers	Lyrics	Length
"Ethir Parthen"	S. P. Balasubrahmanyam, P. Susheela	Vaali	03:59
"Ungalachu Engalukachu"	T. M. Soundararajan, L. R. Eswari, Chorus	Vaali	04:12
"Muthukku Muthaga" (Happy)	Ghantasala	Kannadasan	03:57
"Ammamma Ammamma"	S. P. Balasubrahmanyam, L. R. Eswari	Vaali	03:47
"Muthukku Muthaga" (Sad)	Ghantasala	Kannadasan	02:56

== Reception ==
Kanthan of Kalki called the film enjoyable due to the performance of the cast.
