= Kamala Selvaraj =

Indian obstetrician and gynecologist

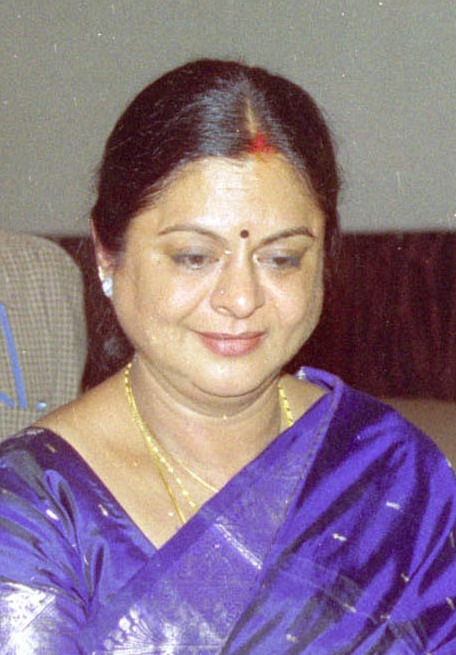
- Kamala in 2005
- Born: Kamala Ganesan; 1944 (age 81–82)
- Education: MD DGO PhD
- Occupation: Obstetrician and gynecologist
- Employer: GG Hospitals
- Known for: Commissioned the first test tube baby in South India
- Spouse: Selvaraj
- Children: 2
- Parent(s): Gemini Ganesan (father); Alamelu (mother)
- Relatives: Rekha (half-sister); Savitri Ganesan (stepmother)
- Awards: Best Lady Doctor award (1993); Rajiv Gandhi Memorial National Integration Award (1995)

Kamala Selvaraj is an Indian obstetrician and gynecologist based in Tamil Nadu, India. She is the daughter of Tamil film actor Gemini Ganesan. Her medical work has focused on Assisted reproductive technology, and she is known for overseeing the birth of South India's first In vitro fertilisation test tube baby at GG Hospital in August 1990. She was awarded the Best Lady Doctor Award in 1993 and Rajiv Gandhi Memorial National Integration Award in 1995. More than 800 babies have been born as a result of assisted reproduction therapy conducted by her hospital.

== Education ==
Selvaraj graduated from Kasturba Medical College, Manipal, and completed her diploma in Gynaecology and Obstetrics (DGO) and Doctor of Medicine (MD) at Madras Medical College, Chennai. She received a PhD in 2001 for her thesis on premature ovarian failure and its management.

== Speciality training ==
Selvaraj attended a week-long workshop at Monash University in Melbourne in November 1985, where she received training in in vitro fertilization (IVF). She later spent three days observing the preparation of culture medium in the IVF laboratory at the National University Hospital in Singapore.

== Selected journals and articles ==
- Fine Structure of Human Oogonia in the Foetal Ovary (2000), co-authored with A. H. Sathananthan and A. O. Trounson, published in Molecular and Cellular Endocrinology.
- Successful Pregnancy in a Patient with a 46,XY Karyotype (2002), co-authored with Vijaya Ganesh and Priya Selvaraj, published in Fertility and Sterility.
- Inside the Tube and Closer to Nature? (2004), co-authored with Priya Selvaraj, published in Reproductive BioMedicine Online.
- From Oogonia to Mature Oocytes: Inactivation of the Maternal Centrosome in Humans (2006), co-authored with A. H. Sathananthan and other researchers, published in Microscopy Research and Technique.
- Two Interesting Cases of Ovarian Pregnancy after In Vitro Fertilization–Embryo Transfer and Its Successful Laparoscopic Management (2009), co-authored with Priya Selvaraj and Gunjan Singh, published in Fertility and Sterility.
- The Fine Structure of Human Germ Layers In Vivo: Clues to the Early Differentiation of Embryonic Stem Cells In Vitro (2011), co-authored with Henry Sathananthan and Joan Clark, published in Reproductive BioMedicine Online.
- Fine Structure of Progenitor Cells in Early Ectopic Human Embryos (2012), co-authored with Henry Sathananthan and Joan Clark, published in Reproductive BioMedicine Online.
- Chromosomal Abnormalities in Infertile Men from Southern India (2015), co-authored with Jaganathan Suganya, Smita B. Kujur and other researchers, published in the Journal of Clinical and Diagnostic Research.
- India's First Successful Surrogate Birth after Percutaneous Oocyte Retrieval Following Modified Radical Hysterectomy and Right Ovarian Transposition to the Anterior Abdominal Wall (2019), co-authored with Priya Selvaraj and other researchers, published in the Journal of Human Reproductive Sciences.

=== Books ===
- Wonder of Motherhood.
- Semen preparation techniques in intrauterine insemination.
- Hysterosalphingogram: Made Easy to Read.
- Mana Amaithikku Uthavum Aanmeegam.
- Slides at a Glance for PG and OBGYN.

== Awards and honours ==
- 1993 - Best Lady Doctor Award.
- 1995 - Rajiv Gandhi Memorial National Integration Award.
- 2001 - Seva Ratna Award.
- 2009 - Paramacharya Award.
- 2011 - Woman Entrepreneur of the Year.
- 2018 - Sakthi Lifetime Achievement Award.

== Personal life ==
Selvaraj is a daughter of Tamil film actor Gemini Ganesan and his first wife Alamelu. She grew up in a joint family along with her three sisters in which her mother emphasised their education.

She is married to a doctor and has two children, including her daughter, Priya Selvaraj, who is also a reproductive medicine specialist and has worked at GG Hospital.
