= Iru Kodugal =

1969 film by K. Balachander

- Theatrical release poster
- Directed by: K. Balachander
- Screenplay by: K. Balachander
- Based on: Iru Kodugal by Joseph Anandan
- Produced by: N. Selvaraj; B. Duraisamy; N. Krishnan; V. Govindarajan
- Starring: Gemini Ganesan; Sowcar Janaki; Jayanthi
- Cinematography: N. Balakrishnan
- Edited by: N. R. Kittu
- Music by: V. Kumar
- Production company: Kalakendra Movies
- Release date: 2 October 1969
- Running time: 176 minutes
- Country: India
- Language: Tamil

Iru Kodugal (transl. Two lines) is a 1969 Indian Tamil-language drama film directed by K. Balachander. The film stars Gemini Ganesan, Sowcar Janaki, Jayanthi, Nagesh, V. S. Raghavan, S. N. Lakshmi and others. The story revolves around one man who was married to two women. Iru Kodugal won the National Film Award for Best Feature Film in Tamil, the first film by Balachander to win the award. The film, which was based on a stage play of same name, was remade in Kannada as Eradu Rekhegalu, in Telugu as Collector Janaki and in Hindi as Sanjog.

== Plot ==
Gopinath falls in love with Janaki and they get married in Kasi. The marriage is not accepted by Gopinath's mother and the couple gets separated. Janaki is pregnant and her father, realising that no man will marry Janaki a second time, decides to make her a collector. Gopinath meanwhile had moved to South India, where he later married Jaya by hiding his previous marriage. They live a happy life with their three children and Jaya's father. Gopinath works as a clerk in the collector's office. A new collector arrives at the office, and it turns out to be Janaki. They tend to work together, until one of the employees in Janaki's office, Babu, spreads a rumour that there is an affair between Janaki and Gopinath. This rumour reaches Jaya and she is greatly disturbed. Jaya discovers the secret of Gopinath's affair with Janaki. Meanwhile, the sons of both Janaki and Jaya, Ramu and Prabhakar almost drown in water and are admitted to hospital. Somehow Jaya manages the disturbance of the secret and accepts Janaki as her sister. But Ramu dies in hospital while Prabhakar survives. Jaya gives Janaki her son as a gift. Janaki and Prabhakar leave for abroad as Janaki is posted abroad.

== Cast ==
- Gemini Ganesan as Gopinath
- Sowcar Janaki as Janaki
- Jayanthi as Jaya
- Nagesh as Babu
- V. S. Raghavan as Janaki's father
- S. V. Sahasranamam as Jaya's father
- Harikrishnan as Harikrishnan
- S. Ramarao as Ramarao
- Gokulnath as Gnanaprakasham
- S. N. Lakshmi as Janaki's aunt
- Sachu
- Gemini Mahalingam
- Seshadri as Gopinath's father
- C. K. Saraswathi as Gopinath's mother
- Shoba as Shoba
- Sumathi as Sumathi
- Master Prabhakar as Prabhakar
- Master Adhinarayan as Ramu

== Production ==
Iru Kodugal was based on the stage play of same name written by Joseph Anandan. It is the first collaboration between Balachander and Ganesan. Though uncharacteristic of Janaki to ask for roles, she asked Balachander for a role and got it. In a scene in the film Janaki's character meets the Chief Minister. Balachander wanted to bring in former Chief Minister C. N. Annadurai (he died 1969) for the scene but did not want to use a body double in his place. Instead, Annadurai's voice was imitated by Sivagangai Sethurajan. Also, a pair of glasses on the table and a pen in the foreground are seen, implying that Annadurai is the intended character.

== Soundtrack ==
The music was scored by V. Kumar, and Vaali wrote the lyrics.

Song	Singers	Length
"Moondru Thamizh Thoondri"	T. M. Soundararajan, A. L. Raghavan, K. Suvarna	04:58
"Naan Oru Gumastha"	T. M. Soundararajan	02:50
"Punnagai Mannan"	K. Jamuna Rani, P. Susheela	05:04
"Kavidhai Ezhudhiya"	P. Leela, P. Susheela	02:37
"Pappa paatu paadiya "	T. M. Soundararajan	03:37

== Release and reception ==
Iru Kodugal was released on 2 October 1969. The Indian Express praised Balachander for adapting the play very well: "No doubt they are very good dramatic moments but there is tendency to overdo the symbolism" and went on to praise the performances of the lead actors. The film was a commercial success, and won the National Film Award for Best Feature Film in Tamil – President's silver medal in 1970, while Janaki won the Tamil Nadu State Film Award for Best Actress.

== Legacy ==
Iru Kodugal was remade in Kannada as Eradu Rekhegalu, in Telugu as Collector Janaki and in Hindi as Sanjog. Malathi Rangarajan said Janaki "stomped the screen and stole our hearts [..] came up with a stellar performance". Clips from the film were screened along with clips from other films such as Server Sundaram (1964), Arangetram (1973), Aval Oru Thodar Kathai (1974), Avargal (1977) and Azhagan (1991) at a function held in Balachander's honour at Tiruchirappalli in January 2015, a month after his death.

== Bibliography ==
- Ganesh, Narayani (2011). Eternal Romantic: My Father, Gemini Ganesan. Roli Books. ISBN 978-81-7436-578-1.
