= Lakshmi Deepak =

Indian film, director and producer

- Born: Telangana, India
- Occupation(s): Director; Producer

Lakshmi Deepak (born P. Lakshmi Deepak) was an Indian film director and producer known for his works predominantly in Telugu cinema, and a few Tamil films In 1972, he directed Pandanti Kapuram, which won the National Film Award for Best Feature Film in Telugu for that year.

== Filmography ==
- Pachchani Samsaram (1970)
- Jagat Jentreelu (1971)
- Kooturu Kodalu (1971)
- Guduputani (1972)
- Pandanti Kapuram (1972)
- Anbu Sagodharargal (1973)
- Gandhi Puttina Desam (1973)
- Harati (1974)
- Inti Kodalu (1974)
- Ee Kalapu Pillalu (1975)
- Makalo Marumakalo (1975)
- Naakoo Swatantram Vachchindi (1975)
- Vayasochchina Pilla (1975)
- Vinta Illu Santa Gola (1976)
- Edadugula Anubandham (1979)
- Karthika Deepam (1979)
- Dharma Chakram (1980)
- Sannayi Appanna (1980)
- Maha Purushudu (1981)
- Telugu Nadu (1982)
- Dhairyavanthudu (1986)

== Awards ==
National Film Awards

- National Film Award for Best Feature Film in Telugu (director) - Pandanti Kapuram (1972)

Filmfare Awards South

- Filmfare Best Film Award (Telugu) - Pandanti Kapuram (1972)
