= Ganga Gowri (1973 film) =

- Poster
- Directed by: B. R. Panthulu
- Story by: A. S. Nagarajan
- Produced by: B. R. Panthulu
- Starring: Gemini Ganesan; Jayalalithaa; Jayanthi
- Cinematography: P. L. Nagappa
- Edited by: V. P. Krishnan
- Music by: M. S. Viswanathan
- Production company: Padmini Pictures
- Release date: 16 January 1973
- Country: India
- Language: Tamil

Ganga Gowri is a 1973 Indian Tamil-language Hindu mythological film, directed and produced by B. R. Panthulu. The film stars Gemini Ganesan and Jayalalithaa & Jayanthi with music composed by M. S. Viswanathan. It is a remake of Panthulu's own 1967 Kannada film Gange Gowri. The film was released on 16 January 1973, and emerged a commercial success.

== Cast ==
- Gemini Ganesan as Lord Shiva
- Jayalalithaa as Ganga
- Jayanthi as Dakshayani / Gowri
- Cho as Lord Narada
- O. A. K. Thevar as Saniswaran
- S. A. Ashokan as Fisherman's leader
- Sivakumar as Narayanan
- Thengai Srinivasan as Subbuni
- Manorama as Kumutha / Katha kalakshepam singer (Story Narrator)
- Poornam Viswanathan as Gowri's father
- C. K. Saraswathi as Akilandam / Gowri's stepmother
- Kumari Padmini as Narada's female incarnation
- Geethanjali as Lakshmi

== Production ==
The film was shot at Premier Studio, Mysore. Ganesan took dancing lessons to portray Shiva in the film.

== Soundtrack ==
The music was composed by M. S. Viswanathan, with lyrics by Kannadasan. The song "Andharangam Naan Ariven" is set in the Hindustani raga Bageshri, and "Azhagiya Megangal" is set to Amritavarshini, a Carnatic raga. The song "Pichandi Thannai" is set in Hindustani raga Ahir Bhairav, and "Aadhi Naathan" is set in Sahana.

Song	Singers
"Aadhi Baghavan"	Sirkazhi Govindarajan
"Pichandi Thannai"	T. M. Soundararajan
"Azhagiya Megangal"	S. Janaki
"Andharangam Naan Ariven"	P. B. Sreenivas, S. Janaki
"Ennamma Annamma"	T. M. Soundararajan, L. R. Eswari
"Aadhi Naathan Kedkinraan"	T. M. Soundararajan, S. Janaki
"Adi Yendiamma"	S. Janaki, L. R. Eswari
