= Satyakam =

- Theatrical release poster
- Directed by: Hrishikesh Mukherjee
- Screenplay by: Bimal Dutta
- Dialogues by: Rajinder Singh Bedi
- Story by: Narayan Sanyal
- Based on: Satyakam by Narayan Sanyal
- Produced by: Sher Jeng Singh Punchhe
- Starring: Ashok Kumar; Dharmendra; Sharmila Tagore; Sanjeev Kumar; Robi Ghosh
- Narrated by: Sanjeev Kumar
- Cinematography: Jaywant Pathare
- Edited by: Das Dhaimade
- Music by: Laxmikant–Pyarelal
- Production company: Punchhe Arts International
- Release date: 4 April 1969
- Running time: 175 minutes
- Country: India
- Language: Hindi

Satyakam is a 1969 Indian drama film directed by Hrishikesh Mukherjee, based on a Bengali novel of the same name by Narayan Sanyal. The name is inspired by the ancient saint Satyakama Jabala. The film stars Dharmendra and Sharmila Tagore, supported by Ashok Kumar, Sanjeev Kumar and Robi Ghosh. The film was scored by Laxmikant–Pyarelal.

The character played by Dharmendra is considered among the finest acts in Indian cinema. The film won the National Film Award For Best Feature Film in Hindi. It also won the 1971 Filmfare Best Dialogue Award for Rajinder Singh Bedi. The film was remade in Tamil as Punnagai (1971) by K. Balachander.

== Plot ==
Satyapriya Acharya is a man of principles and truth. His views and way of life were guided by his ascetic grandfather "Dada ji" Satyasharan Acharya. Armed with an engineering degree, Satyapriya ventures out to realize his dreams about building a new India, but encounters characters who share little of his ideals. During his first assignment, he meets Ranjana, who is about to be sexually exploited by a debauching prince, his employer. Fully aware that Ranjana loves him, Satyapriya hesitates in rescuing her and lets her become prey of the morally corrupt prince. The incident shakes the moral foundation of Satyapriya, who has betrayed his conscience and feelings. To redress the mounting guilt, he marries Ranjana, but their lives are never the same again. She bears a child whose paternity is never clearly established. Later, Satyapriya moves from one job to another as he is unable to make dishonest compromises. Satyapriya and Ranjana also have their share of marital conflicts. She tries to lead a normal life and longs to forget her past. Satyapriya is constantly reminded of his failure and appears to make up for it by increasing rigidity about applying his principles in real life.

Struggling professionally, he is struck by an incurable and fatal illness. In the end, hospitalised and unable to even speak, Satyapriya is pursued by an unscrupulous contractor seeking approval for a badly executed civil project, in exchange for which the contractor would give him a substantial sum that would take care of Satyapriya's wife Ranjana and their child after his death. Satyapriya has no means to secure his family's future and in the very first compromise of his life, he hands over the signed approval papers to his wife. Although Ranjana had suffered many hardships and is not entirely happy with Satyapriya's redder-than-rose approach to life, she does not want to see him falter at the end of his life. She tears up the documents and finds him smiling at her. Although unable to speak, Satyapriya is clearly happy that he was able to convert at least one person to his idealist worldview.

On learning of Satyapriya's condition, his grandfather "Dada ji" comes visiting. He had earlier turned his back on Satyapriya for marrying a woman without his consent and according to him, of questionable background. Well versed in religious philosophy, the grandfather offers words of wisdom to Satyapriya. He tells Satyapriya that being aware of ideas like impermanence of worldly life and the larger divine truth, Satyaprakash is morally equipped to confidently face death. After his passing, the grandfather says that he would perform the last rites because of the questionable paternity of his grandson. At that moment Satyapriya and Ranjana's child publicly speaks the truth saying the real reason for his not performing the last rites is because he is not Sat’s biological son. The grandfather is humbled by the fact that he who swore by fidelity to truth regardless of the consequences, could not practice it except in isolation from his Gurukula, where he was not being tested. Yet his granddaughter-in-law could share this issue with her child and the child could speak about it in public, even though it was uncomfortable and would translate into taunts and humiliation from the rest of the world. The grandfather publicly acknowledges his failings that even though he has spent his whole life studying religious scriptures and philosophical books as well as practising many rituals, he still has much to learn about the nature of truth. He drinks water from the hands of the son and lets go of his prejudices. The film ends with him departing for home with Ranjana and her child.

== Cast ==
- Ashok Kumar as Satyasharan Acharya / Dada ji – Sat’s grandfather
- Dharmendra as Satyapriya "Sat" Acharya
- Sharmila Tagore as Ranjana – Sat’s wife
- Sanjeev Kumar as Narendra "Naren" Sharma – Sat’s best friend
- Robi Ghosh as Ananto Chatterjee
- David as Rustom
- Baby Sarika as Kabul Archarya – Sat and Ranjana’s son
- Tarun Bose as Mr. Ladia
- Asrani as Peter
- Dina Pathak as Harbhajan's mother
- Manmohan as Kunver Vikram Singh
- Baldev Khosa
- Sapru as Deewan Bajridhar Talwar
- Uma Dutt as Chief Engineer
- Rajan Haksar as Shyam Sunder
- Dev Kishan as Shiv Nandan

== Music and soundtrack ==
The film’s music was composed by Laxmikant–Pyarelal and the lyrics of the songs were penned by Kaifi Azmi.

Track listing
No.	Title	Singer(s)	Length
1.	"Abhi Kya Sunoge"	Lata Mangeshkar	3:38
2.	"Do Din Ki Zindagi"	Lata Mangeshkar	4:08
3.	"Zindagi Hai Kya Bolo"	Kishore Kumar, Mukesh, Mahendra Kapoor	6:22
Total length:			14:08
