= Velli Vizha =

- Poster
- Directed by: K. Balachander
- Written by: K. Balachander
- Produced by: N. Selvaraj; B. Duraisamy; N. Krishnan; V. Govindarajan
- Starring: Gemini Ganesan; Jayanthi; Vanisri; S. Varalakshmi
- Cinematography: N. Balakrishnan
- Edited by: N. R. Kittu
- Music by: V. Kumar
- Production company: Kalakendra Movies
- Release date: 11 August 1972
- Running time: 166 minutes
- Country: India
- Language: Tamil

Velli Vizha (pronounced [ʋeɭɭi ʋiɻaː] transl. Silver Jubilee) is a 1972 Indian Tamil-language film, written and directed by K. Balachander. The film stars Gemini Ganesan, Jayanthi, Vanisri and S. Varalakshmi. It was released on 11 August 1972.

== Plot ==
Bala, married to Banu and son of Sivakami, is a rich and a celebrated tennis player with plethora of fans. Banu is a timid, obedient housewife and they have children too. Sheela is his fan and is the polar opposite of Banu. She is loud, obnoxious and a go-getter. Her brother Joseph happens to be a friend of Bala. She stalks Bala, befriends him and goes on to befriend Sivakami and Banu too. Sivakami begins to see her mannerisms as disgusting while Banu admires her courage and trusts her husband. Joseph, however, overhears Sheela while she is sleep-talking and confronts her about her love for Bala which she denies. She then gives in and decides to leave the family alone. Fate strikes and Banu dies leaving Bala desolate and heartbroken. Sivakami asks Sheela now to marry Bala but she, having given her word, leaves.

Sheela however starts letter correspondence with the family and becomes a surrogate mother to the children "bringing" them up through letters. Manorama, family friend, is the only one who understands and always has understood the relationship. A point comes where Sheela comes to visit the now adult children and Manorama's husband Aramuthan recognizes her and tells the children the flashback. Indirectly blaming Sheela for Banu's death, they hate her and throw her out fearing she might marry Bala and become an heir to the property. Bala, in anger, gives up all the property, marries Sheela to legitimize her sacrifices and moves out.

== Cast ==
- Gemini Ganesan as Bala
- Jayanthi as Banu
- Vanisri as Sheela
- S. Varalakshmi as Sivakami, Bala's mother
- V. Gopalakrishnan as Joseph
- Thengai Srinivasan as Aramuthan
- Manorama as Komalam
- S. V. Sahasranamam as Postman Kumarasamy
- S. N. Lakshmi as Kumarasamy's wife
- Srividya as Kalyani
- Rajakokila
- Vidhubala
- K. R. Savithri as Radha
- Shanmugasundaram as Raja
- V. S. Raghavan Church Father

== Production ==
While shooting for the film, Balachander suffered a heart attack at the age of 42, and spent three and a half weeks in hospital.

== Soundtrack ==
The music was composed by V. Kumar, with lyrics by Vaali.

Song	Singers	Length
"Orunaal Varuval"	P. Susheela, T. M. Soundararajan	03:13
"Kaathoduthaan Dhaan"	L. R. Eswari	03:11
"Naan Satham Pottuthan Paduven"	P. Susheela	02:48
"Kainiraiya Chozhi"	P. Susheela, L. R. Eswari	03:14
"Unakkenna Kuraichal"	M. S. Viswanathan	03:20

== Release and reception ==
Velli Vizha was released on 11 August 1972. When the film was released in Malaysia, posters of leaders of the Indian Communist Party shown in the background were censored. Ananda Vikatan praised the performances of S. Varalakshmi, Manorama and Thengai Srinivasan but felt Vanisri's characterisation is damaged in second half and concluded that the film's first half is gold and the second half is not even brass.
