= Idhaya Malar =

- Theatrical release poster
- Directed by: Gemini Ganesan; Thamarai Manaalan
- Screenplay by: 'Vidhwan' Ve. Lakshmanan
- Based on: Ninaivugal Nilaikkatum by Manian
- Produced by: G. M. Kulathu; V.L. Narayanan
- Starring: Sujatha; Gemini Ganesan; Kamal Haasan
- Cinematography: D.V. Rajaram; B. Nanjappa
- Edited by: M. Umanath; M. Mani
- Music by: M. S. Viswanathan
- Production company: Jeyanthira Movies
- Release date: 3 September 1976
- Running time: 133 minutes
- Country: India
- Language: Tamil

Idhaya Malar (transl. Flower of the heart) is a 1976 Indian Tamil-language romantic drama film directed by Gemini Ganesan and Thamarai Manaalan. It is based on the novel Ninaivugal Nilaikkatum, written by Maniyan. The film stars Sujatha, Gemini Ganesan and Kamal Haasan. It was released on 3 September 1976.

== Plot ==
Krishnan, an elderly person with his wife Rajam are childless and bring up Radha, who is Krishnan's sister as their daughter. Mohan, a tennis player, falls in love with Radha. Krishnan accepts to their proposal to marry but Rajam avoids the marriage by revealing a bitter truth to Radha. Radha had married Sridhar at the age of five. She avoids Mohan who is actually the brother of Sridhar. She goes in search of Sridhar but finds out he is married . She returns home and avoids her family and lives alone. Mohan's neighbour is very possessive of and has a crush on him. The film ends with Mohan marrying his neighbour and Radha sacrificing her love.

== Cast ==
- Gemini Ganesan as Krishnan
- Sowcar Janaki as Rajam
- Sujatha as Radha
- Kamal Haasan as Mohan
- Vijayakumar as Sreedhar
- K. A. Thangavelu as Singaram
- M. Saroja as Kumari

== Production ==
Idhaya Malar is the directorial debut of Gemini Ganesan, and the only film he directed in his life. After directing some scenes, he left due to differences with the producer, resulting in Thamarai Manaalan taking over. However, both men retained director's credit. The film was launched at Vauhini recording studios on 18 March 1976. This film was shot in black-and-white. It was given a "U" (Unrestricted) certificate by the Central Board of Film Certification after three cuts. The final length of the film was 3,931.30 metres (12,898.0 ft).

== Soundtrack ==
Soundtrack was composed by M. S. Viswanathan. All lyrics written by Pulamaipithan.

Track listing
No.	Title	Singer(s)	Length
1.	"Sendumallipoo"	Vani Jairam, K. J. Yesudas
2.	"Thazhampoo Kaigalukku"	P. Susheela, B. S. Sasirekha
3.	"Anbe Un Per Enna"	Vani Jairam, P. Jayachandran
4.	"En Chellakkili"	P. Susheela

== Reception ==
A critic from Kalki appreciated the film for the performances of most of the cast.
