= Punnagai =

1971 film by K. Balachander

- Theatrical release poster
- Directed by: K. Balachander
- Screenplay by: K. Balachander
- Story by: Narayan Sanyal
- Based on: Satyakam by Hrishikesh Mukherjee
- Produced by: R. Venkatraman; K. Arumugam; H. Nagaraja Rao; S. S. Nachammai
- Starring: Gemini Ganesan; R. Muthuraman; Nagesh; M. R. R. Vasu; Jayanthi
- Cinematography: N. Balakrishnan
- Edited by: N. R. Kittu
- Music by: M. S. Viswanathan
- Production company: Amutham Pictures
- Release date: 5 November 1971
- Running time: 154 minutes
- Country: India
- Language: Tamil

Punnagai (transl. Smile) is a 1971 Indian Tamil-language buddy drama film directed and written by K. Balachander. It is a remake of the Hindi film Satyakam (1969) which starred Dharmendra. The film stars Gemini Ganesan, R. Muthuraman, Nagesh, M. R. R. Vasu and Jayanthi. It was released on 5 November 1971.

== Plot ==
The story is narrated by Rajbabu, who wants to write a book on the life of his friend, Sathya. Sathya, Rajan, Rajbabu, Mandiramoorthi and Haniff are college-mates in Madras. To celebrate their graduation, they go on a drive around the city in Haniff's car, singing about the ideals of life. The car crashes and Haniff dies, leaving his friends shocked. As time passes, Rajan, Rajbabu and Mandiramoorthi become corrupted in their pursuit of a materialistic lifestyle while Sathya vows to remain a righteous person. He meets Kanchana, a helpless young woman who has been raped and impregnated by a rich predator. She gives birth to a son, Kumar. Sathya marries her and raises Kumar as his own son. Kanchana's rapist later leaves his wealth to Kumar, but Kanchana refuses to take it. Sathya falls ill. His kidneys fail and his friends turn away when the doctor asks if any of them would donate their kidney to him. Sathya ultimately dies, but Kanchana continues to hold on to the values he taught her. Sathya's friends ultimately realize their folly and publish Rajbabu's book with the title Punnagai.

== Cast ==
- Gemini Ganesan as Sathya
- R. Muthuraman as Rajan
- Nagesh as Rajbabu
- M. R. R. Vasu as Mandiramoorthi
- V. S. Raghavan as Mohan Ram
- Jayanthi as Kanchana
- S. V. Ramadas as the playboy
- A. Sakunthala as Sakunthala
- Baby Mythili as Kumar, Kanchana's son
- K.K. Soundar as the interviewer
- S. N. Parvathy
- Shoba
- Major Sundarrajan (cameo appearance)
- V. Gopalakrishnan as Haniff (cameo appearance)

== Production ==
Punnagai is a remake of the Hindi film Satyakam (1969), with some changes made in the screenplay. Although Gemini Ganesan was usually billed with the sobriquet "Kaadhal Mannan" (King of Romance) in film credits, this was the first film where he was billed as "Nadippu Selvam". The film's cinematographer was N. Balakrishnan.

== Soundtrack ==
Music was by M. S. Viswanathan and lyrics were by Kannadasan.

| Songs | Singer | Length |
|---|---|---|
| "Naalai Naamoru Rajangam" | T. M. Soundararajan, S. P. Balasubrahmanyam, K. Veeramani, Saibaba | 04:38 |
| "Aanaiyiten Nerungathe" | S. Janaki | 05:15 |
| "Naanum Kooda Rajathaane" | T. M. Soundararajan | 03:46 |

== Reception ==
According to historian Randor Guy, the film was not a commercial success, but was considered a classic by critics.
