= Manam Pola Mangalyam =

1953 film by P. Pullaiah

- Theatrical release poster
- Directed by: P. Pullaiah
- Screenplay by: Umachandran; K. V. Srinivasan
- Story by: Sadasivabrahmam
- Produced by: Narayana Iyengar
- Starring: R. Ganesh; Savitri; K. Sarangapani
- Music by: Addepalli Rama Rao
- Production companies: Narayanan and Company
- Distributed by: Narayanan and Company
- Release date: 5 November 1953
- Country: India
- Language: Tamil

Manam Pola Mangalyam (transl. Marriage to a partner of your own choice) is a 1953 Indian Tamil language comedy film directed by P. Pullaiah. The film stars Gemini Ganesan (then R. Ganesh) and Savitri in the lead roles. It was released on 5 November 1953. No print of the film is known to survive, making it a lost film.

== Plot ==
The film is a comedy of mistaken identity of two look-alikes, one of whom is an inmate of a lunatic asylum who escapes. By a twist of fate, Gemini Ganesan and Savithri fell in love.

Besides the situation comedy that is full of twists and turns, Sarangapani, who played an elderly man wanting to marry the heroine, topping it creates some problem and prevents them from getting married.

Meanwhile the other Gemini Ganesan who is mistakenly locked in the asylum falls in love with the nurse played by Surabhi Balasaraswathi. After Sarangapani discovers him, he uses it to his advantage to fool Savitri into thinking that Gemini Ganesan is not loyal to her and is only after her for her money.

In the end, Gemini Ganesan foils Sarangapani's plans and the movie ends with the four if them getting married

== Cast ==
Credits adapted from The Hindu:

Male cast

- R. Ganesh
- K. Sarangapani
- Friend Ramasami
- T. N. Sivathanu
- T. N. Meenakshi
- K. Natarajan
- C. Rajarathnam
- S. Peer Mohammed
- T. K. Kalyanam
- G. V. Sharma
- V. P. Balaraman
- Gundu Mani
- Loose Arumugam
- Kottapuli Jayaraman

Female cast

- Savitri as Kalyani
- Surabhi Balasaraswathi
- M. R. Santhanalakshmi

== Production ==
Manam Pola Mangalyam was directed by P. Pullaiah and produced by Narayanan and Company. The storyline was written by Telugu screenwriter Vempati Sadhasivabramham, the Tamil script by Umachandran and K. V. Srinivasan. All three men received credit onscreen for the story and screenplay. Gemini Ganesan (then known as R. Ganesh) was cast as the male lead. He appeared in a dual role, one of his characters being an asylum escapee. The final length of the film was 15,535 feet (4,735 m).

== Soundtrack ==
The soundtrack was composed by Addepalli Rama Rao, with lyrics by Kanaka Surabhi. One of the soundtrack's hit numbers was "Maappillai Doi", performed by A. M. Rajah and P. Leela.

Track listing
No.	Title	Singer(s)	Length
1.	"Maappillai Doi"	P. Leela, A. M. Rajah	3:13
2.	"Nalla Caaril Erikondu"	Jikki	3:06
3.	"Pona Macchan"	P. Leela	2:42
4.	"Ellorukkum Vaaikkiradhu"	P. Leela	2:05
5.	"Solai Naduve Odi"	M. L. Vasanthakumari	2:44
6.	"Kalaiyin Uruvam Engal"	(Radha) Jayalakshmi
7.	"Andru Ododi Vandhu Uyir Koduthaai"	(Radha) Jayalakshmi
8.	"Aavadhum Pennale"	V. J. Varma & P. Susheela	2:31
9.	"Aasa Vachen Un Mele"	V. J. Varma
10.	"Pollaa Siraikkoodamaa Ivvulagam"	V. J. Varma

== Reception ==
The film became a major commercial success, and a breakthrough in the careers of both Savitri and Ganesan. The duo would subsequently act in many films together which became successful. Film historian Randor Guy praised the fact that Ganesan "did not indulge in fisticuffs every fifth scene, nor did he deliver jaw-breaking, alliterative and seemingly endless passages of dialogue." He said the film would be "Remembered for the excellent performances of the new hero in a double role, Gemini Ganesh, Savithri and Sarangapani and the melodious tunes of Rama Rao which are still fondly remembered by old-timers."
