= Pandanti Kapuram =

- Film poster
- Directed by: Lakshmi Deepak
- Written by: Prabhakar Reddy (story); Maddipatla Suri (dialogue)
- Produced by: G. Hanumantha Rao
- Starring: Krishna; S. V. Ranga Rao; Gummadi; Vijaya Nirmala; B. Saroja Devi
- Cinematography: V. S. R. Swamy
- Edited by: K. Gopala Rao
- Music by: S. P. Kodandapani
- Production company: Jayaprada Pictures
- Distributed by: Poorna Pictures Private Limited
- Release date: 21 July 1972
- Running time: 165 minutes
- Country: India
- Language: Telugu

Pandanti Kapuram is a 1972 Indian Telugu-language family drama film directed by Lakshmi Deepak. The film features an ensemble cast of Krishna, S. V. Ranga Rao, Vijaya Nirmala, Jamuna, B. Saroja Devi, Anjali Devi, Gummadi, and Prabhakar Reddy. Released on July 21, 1972, Pandanti Kapuram was one of the biggest hits of the year. It also became Krishna first film to celebrate a silver-jubilee (175 days) run at the box-office.

The film won the National Award for Best Feature Film in Telugu and the Filmfare Award for Best Film - Telugu. It was remade into the Hindi as Sunehra Sansar (1975) and in Tamil as Anbu Sagodharargal (1973). Jayasudha made her screen debut as a child actor in this film (credited as Sujatha, her birth name).

== Cast ==
- Krishna as Ravi
- Jamuna as Rani Malini Devi/Savitha
- B. Saroja Devi as Sobha
- Vijaya Nirmala as Suseela "Susi"
- S. V. Ranga Rao as Narayana Rao
- Gummadi as Srinivasa Rao "Vasu"
- Prabhakar Reddy as Madhu
- Mikkilineni as Koteswara Rao
- Allu Ramalingaiah as Chengayya
- Raja Babu as Sanjeevi
- Sakshi Rangarao as Rudrayya
- Ram Mohan as Mohan
- Devika as Lakshmi
- Pandari Bai as Chinnamma
- Radha Kumari as Jagadamba
- Jayasudha as Santhi
- Sandhya Rani as Asha
- Master Naresh Kumar as Ramu
- Baby Dolly as Babu
- Balakrishna as Botany Lecturer
- Potti Prasad as Botany Lecturer's son

== Production ==
Jamuna's character in the film, Rani Malini Devi was inspired by Ingrid Bergman's character in the 1964 film The Visit. Jayasudha made her acting debut with this film as child artist under her real name Sujatha.

== Music ==
The music was composed by S. P. Kodandapani. The song "Babu Vinara" is quite popular.

== Box office ==
Pandanti Kapuram was the biggest hit of the year 1972. It is also the first film of Krishna to celebrate a silver jubilee run at the box office. The film completed a 100-day run in 21 centres (direct-19, shift-2).

== Awards ==
National Film Awards

- National Film Award for Best Feature Film in Telugu - 1972

Filmfare Awards South

- Filmfare Best Film Award (Telugu) (1972) - G. Hanumantha Rao
- Filmfare Special Commendation Award - Jamuna
