= Meenda Sorgam =

1960 film by C. V. Sridhar

- Theatrical release poster
- Directed by: Sridhar
- Written by: Sridhar
- Produced by: T. A. Dorairajan
- Starring: Gemini Ganesan; Padmini
- Cinematography: A. Vincent
- Edited by: N. M. Shankar
- Music by: T. Chalapathi Rao
- Production company: Madhuram Pictures
- Release date: 29 July 1960
- Running time: 180 minutes
- Country: India
- Language: Tamil

Meenda Sorgam (transl. Paradise regained) is a 1960 Indian Tamil-language romantic musical film, written and directed by Sridhar. The film stars Gemini Ganesan and Padmini, with K. A. Thangavelu, T. R. Ramachandran, N. Lalitha and Manorama in supporting roles. It was released on 29 July 1960 and failed commercially.

== Plot ==
Nirmala is a poor but talented dancer who falls in love with Sekar, a rich man's son. But Sekar is forced into a marriage with Prathiba, a rich man's spoilt daughter. Inconsolable, Nirmala promises her lover that she will never give public performances. Due to various circumstances, Sekar's finances suffer losses and his house is put up for auction. To rescue him from a dire future, Nirmala breaks her promise and gives a dance performance. With the money thus earned, she saves his house. But Sekar is unaware of this. When he learns the truth, he begins searching for her. In the meantime, Prathiba, who is now reformed, commits suicide. Sekar locates Nirmala, who is on the verge of committing suicide, and they are reunited.

== Cast ==
- Gemini Ganesan as Sekhar
- Padmini as Nirmala
- K. A. Thangavelu as Sachithanandham Pillai
- T. R. Ramachandran as Gopu
- N. Lalitha as Prathiba
- Manorama as Sachu
- K. N. Kamalam as Kamalam
- K. Nataraj as Nirmala's dance Teacher
- Sairam as Azhagu
- P. S. Venkatachalam as Duraisami

Dance

- Sasi, Revathi, Sakunthala, Rita, Bala, Rajam,
  Jaya, Shantha, Jayanthi, Nirmala, Nalini, Mohana,
  Leela, Kamala, Nagu, Vittoba, and Rajeswari.

== Production ==
Madhuram Pictures initially began a film called Agal Vilakku (transl. Clay lamp) with S. S. Rajendran and E. V. Saroja starring. Sridhar penned the script for that film; however, the film was dropped after the first filming schedule due to Saroja's pregnancy. The company decided to make a new film Meenda Sorgam and chose T. R. Raghunath as director and Gemini Ganesan and Padmini as lead actors. However Raghunath wanted Rajendran as the lead and left the film due to uncertainty in finalising the lead actor which led the film's crew to insist Sridhar to direct this film. The film was produced by T. A. Dorairajan, cinematography was handled by A. Vincent, and editing by N. M. Shankar. C. V. Rajendran, a relative of Sridhar, joined the film as an assistant director, making this the first of many collaborations between him and Sridhar. The scene where Padmini's character dances vigorously, causing a bell from one of her anklets to slip and hit a lamp hanging near a statue of Nataraja, causing oil to splash and fall into the eyes of Nataraja to make him look like he was shedding tears, took as many as 20 retakes to perfect; despite this, the censor board refused to allow the shot of Nataraja shedding tears in the final cut.

== Soundtrack ==
Music was composed by T. Chalapathi Rao. Sridhar signed on Rao as the composer after working with him in Amara Deepam (1956). He initially wanted Pattukkottai Kalyanasundaram to write the lyrics, but could not hire the poet due to his death. The song "Kalaiyae En Vazhkaiyin" is set to Bageshri raga, and "Aadum Arul Jothi" is set to Kalyani.

Song	Singers	Lyrics	Length
"Thulli Thulli Oduthe"	Jikki		03:22
"Aadum Arul Jothi"	M. L. Vasanthakumari & Seerkazhi Govindarajan	K. S. Gopalakrishnan	04:39
"Kalaiyae En Vazhkaiyin" (Male)	A. M. Rajah & P. Susheela (humming)	Kannadasan	04:19
"Singara Thoppile"	P. Leela & S. Janaki		04:02
"Kalaiyae En Vazhkaiyin" (female)	P. Susheela	Kannadasan	03:55
"Padmini Dance"	Instrumental		04:41
"Thuyilladha Penn Ondru"	A. M. Rajah & P. Susheela		03:34
"Mana Nattiya Medaiyil"	P. Susheela & A. M. Rajah		04:31
"Aangikam Bhuvanam"	M. L. Vasanthakumari		06:24

== Release and reception ==
Meenda Sorgam was released on 29 July 1960. In the promotional posters, Sridhar was billed as "Kalaignar Thilakam" (transl. The jewel among artists) without his consent, which angered him. The title was previously bestowed upon him by the Madurai Students' Federation soon after the success of Kalyana Parisu (1959). The Indian Express praised the performances of the cast, particularly Ganesan, Padmini and Thangavelu, along with Vincent's cinematography. Kanthan of Kalki appreciated Ganesan's performance, but felt it lacked newness, though the film could be watched more than once. According to historian Randor Guy, the film did not succeed commercially, as it was thought to be too highbrow and idealistic.

== Bibliography ==
- Sundararaman (2007) [2005]. Raga Chintamani: A Guide to Carnatic Ragas Through Tamil Film Music (2nd ed.). Pichhamal Chintamani. OCLC 295034757.
