= Thai Ullam =

1952 film by K. Ramnoth

- Theatrical release poster
- Directed by: K. Ramnoth
- Screenplay by: S. D. Sundaram; Umachandran
- Based on: East Lynne by Ellen Wood
- Produced by: Pattanna
- Starring: V. Nagayya; Manohar; M. V. Rajamma; Madhuri Devi
- Cinematography: N. Prakash
- Edited by: S. P. Chandrasekar
- Music by: V. Nagayya; A. Rama Rao
- Production companies: Narayanan & Company
- Distributed by: Narayanan & Company
- Release date: 9 February 1952
- Country: India
- Language: Tamil

Thai Ullam (transl. Mother's Heart) is a 1952 Indian Tamil-language film directed by K. Ramnoth. Starring V. Nagayya, Manohar and R. Ganesh, the film has music composed by Nagayya and A. Rama Rao. It is an adaptation of the 1861 novel East Lynne, by Ellen Wood. The film was released on 9 February 1952, and emerged both a critical and commercial success.

== Cast ==
Male cast

- V. Nagayya as Zamindar Seethapathy
- Manohar as Manohar
- R. Ganesh as Sekar
- K. Ramasami as Clerk Kuppu
- N. Seetharaman as Magistrate Masilamani
- Chandra Babu as Sukumar
- Kolathumani as Ponnambalam
- C. V. V. Panthulu as Sabapathy

Female cast

- M. V. Rajamma as Nirmala
- Madhuri Devi as Vasundhara
- K. R. Chellam as Santhamma
- T. P. Muthulakshmi as Janaki
- Sakunthala as Singari
- C. K. Saraswathi as Kanthimathi

Supporting cast

T. K. Kalyanam, G. V. Sharma, Nandaram, Loose Arumugam, and V. T. Kalyanam.

== Production ==
K. Ramnoth, who had left Gemini Studios on 15 August 1947, worked for Narayanan & Company, for which he made the film Thai Ullam, an adaptation of the 1861 novel East Lynne by Ellen Wood. While Manohar was cast as the male lead, T. S. Balaiah was considered for playing the antagonist. He however opted out of the project after demanding a salary of ₹75,000, which he was refused. Subsequently, he was replaced by a then struggling actor named R. Ganesh, who later became known as Gemini Ganesan.

== Soundtrack ==
The songs were composed by Nagayya and A. Rama Rao, with lyrics by Kanakasurabhi, Subramania Bharati and Kavimani Desigavinayagam Pillai. The song "Vella Thamarai" is based on Bharati's poem of the same name. The song "Konjum Puraave" is based on the song "Thandi Hawayen" from the Hindi film Naujawan (1951). That, along with the songs "Kovil Muluthum Kanden", "Kathayai Kelada", "Vellai Thamarai" and "Poo Chendu Nee" attained popularity.

Song	Singer	Lyricist	Length
"Ohoho Nilave Nillay Odathe"	Jikki	Kanakasurabhi	
"Konjum Puraave"	M. L. Vasanthakumari	Kanakasurabhi	03:04
"Nathathile Pethama"	T. A. Mothi	Kanakasurabhi	
"Vellai Thamarai Poovil"	M. L. Vasanthakumari	Subramania Bharathi	
"Kovil Muzhuthun Kanden"	M. L. Vasanthakumari	Kavimani Desigavinayagam Pillai	03:02
"Poochendu Nee"	T. A. Mothi, (Radha) Jayalakshmi & N. L. Ganasaraswathi	Kanakasurabhi	03:35
"Pokkiri Payale Nee Polladhavan"	(Radha) Jayalakshmi	Kanakasurabhi	02:00
"Anbai Ariyamal Kali Odi Poche"	T. A. Mothi	Kanakasurabhi	
"Baby Baby Chinna Chinna Baby"	Jikki	Kanakasurabhi	02:38
"Malai Nila Varavendum"	R. Balasaraswathi & T. A. Mothi	Kanakasurabhi	
"Kathayai Kelada"	M. L. Vasanthakumari	Kanakasurabhi	02:51

== Release ==
Thai Ullam was released on 9 February 1952, and distributed by Narayanan & Company themselves. The film was both a critical and commercial success, and a major breakthrough for Ganesh, who would later become a part of the "Big Three" of Tamil cinema, the other two being Sivaji Ganesan and M. G. Ramachandran.
