= School Master (1973 film) =

1973 film by B. R. Panthulu

- Poster
- Directed by: B. R. Panthulu
- Screenplay by: A. Jagadeesan
- Story by: Padmini Pictures Story Dept.
- Produced by: B. R. Panthulu
- Starring: Gemini Ganesan; Sowcar Janaki; Srikanth; Rajasree
- Cinematography: Amirtham
- Edited by: V. P. Krishnan
- Music by: M. S. Viswanathan
- Production company: Padmini Pictures
- Release date: 1973
- Country: India
- Language: Tamil

School Master is a 1973 Indian Tamil-language film, produced and directed by B. R. Panthulu. The film stars Gemini Ganesan, Sowcar Janaki, Srikanth and Rajasree. It is a remake of Panthulu's 1958 Kannada film of the same name.

== Plot ==
The film revolves around an old school master and his noble attempt to transform the lives of students of his native village.

== Cast ==
- Gemini Ganesan
- Sowcar Janaki
- Srikanth
- Rajasree
- M. N. Nambiar
- Cho
- Thengai Srinivasan
- Kumari Padmini
- Rama Prabha
- Ennathe Kannaiah
- C. K. Saraswathi
- R. Muthuraman (Guest Appearance)
- S. A. Ashokan (Guest Appearance)

== Soundtrack ==
The soundtrack was composed by M. S. Viswanathan, while lyrics were written by Kannadasan.

Track listing
No.	Title	Singer(s)	Length
1.	"Poonkodiye Poonkodiye Poovirunthal"	S. P. Balasubrahmanyam, S. Janaki
2.	"Agara Mudhala Ezhuthellam"	Sirkazhi Govindarajan, Chorus
3.	"Odi Vangada Onna Vangada"	L. R. Anjali, Chorus
4.	"Thannanth Thanimaiyile"	P. Susheela
5.	"Paatha Sirisuthan Paatti"	Pushpalatha

== Reception ==
Kanthan of Kalki criticised the story for being outdated, and lacking newness.

== Bibliography ==
- Rajadhyaksha, Ashish; Willemen, Paul (1998) [1994]. Encyclopaedia of Indian Cinema. British Film Institute and Oxford University Press. ISBN 0-19-563579-5.
