= Jayanthi (actress) =

Indian actress (1947–2021)

- Born: Kamala Kumari; 6 January 1947; Bellary, Madras Presidency, British Raj
- Died: 26 July 2021 (aged 74); Banashankari, Bangalore, Karnataka, India
- Occupation: Actress
- Years active: 1960–2021
- Spouse: Peketi Sivaram
- Children: 1
- Relatives: Prashanth (step grandson)

Kamala Kumari (6 January 1947 – 26 July 2021), known by her stage name Jayanthi, was an Indian actress known for her work in Kannada cinema and Telugu cinema. She was noted for her contributions to different genres of films from the 1960s, 1970s and early 1980s. She had appeared in over 500 films in various languages, including Kannada, Telugu, Tamil, Malayalam, Hindi and Marathi.

Jayanthi was the recipient of seven Karnataka State Film Awards, four times as Best Actress and twice as Best Supporting Actress, the President's Medal for Best Actress and two Filmfare Awards for Best Actress. She has been cited as Kannada cinema's "most bold and beautiful" actress by various media outlets, a title for which she has received substantial publicity. The Kannada film industry honored her with the title "Abhinaya Sharadhe", (Goddess Sharada in acting).

== Early life ==
Jayanthi was born in Bellary, in the erstwhile Madras Presidency of British India on 6 January 1947. Her father Balasubramanyam worked as English professor at the St Joseph's College in Bangalore. Her mother was Santhanalakshmi. Jayanthi was the eldest of three siblings and had two younger brothers. Her parents separated when she was young and her mother took the children and moved to Madras. Jayanthi's mother was keen on making her daughter a classical dancer and hence she joined a dance school. Her friend in dance school was the popular Tamil actress Manorama.

== Career ==
=== Initial struggle ===
As a child, Jayanthi went to the studios to see her idol N. T. Rama Rao. He called her and made her sit on his lap. Affectionately, he had asked her whether she would agree to become his heroine and the little girl had merely blushed. The pair would go on later in life to produce successful films such as Jagadeka Veeruni Katha, Kula Gowravam, Kondaveeti Simham and Justice Chowdhury. During her teens, she had the chance to act in a few Tamil and Telugu movies in bit parts. Jayanthi was ridiculed most of the time as she was plump and could never dance well. Jayanthi promised herself that one day she would prove her worth.

Jayanthi's life changed when noted film director Y. R. Swamy spotted her during one of her dance rehearsals and cast her in his film Jenu Goodu after persuading her mother. He also gave her the stage name. Jayanthi enjoyed a good run in the Kannada Film industry. She has costarred in more than 40 movies with Rajkumar, the doyen of Kannada cinema.

=== Rise to fame ===
Jenu Goodu, Jayanthi's first Kannada film was commercial success. Her next Kannada film as heroine was T. V. Singh Thakur's Chandavalliya Thota, the first film that paired her with Rajkumar. Based on T. R. Subba Rao's novel the film was a huge success and even won the President's Medal for Best Film in Kannada. The next major film that Jayanthi starred in was the 1965 Miss Leelavathi directed by M. R. Vittal in which she played the title role. Considered a film with a bold theme at the time, Jayanthi was launched as the glamour-diva wearing skirts, T-shirts and nighties which was a first for a Kannada film. The film was a huge success and catapulted Jayanthi to fame. She is credited with being the first Kannada actress to wear swimsuit on screen. The film won Jayanthi the President's award. Jayanthi recalled the occasion in one of her interviews that Indira Gandhi (then Ministry of Information and Broadcasting), after giving the award, gave her a kiss and wished her good luck. She went on to act in over 30 films with Rajkumar.

Jayanthi featured in Tamil films from 1962 to 1979 and acted with all major stars as the leading lady. She costarred with M. G. Ramachandran in Padagotti and Mugaraasi, with Gemini Ganesan in Kanna Nalama, Velli Vizha, Punnagai, Ganga Gowri and Iru Kodugal, with Jaishankar in Nil Gavani Kadhali and Kaadhal Paduthum Paadu and Ethir Neechal with Nagesh. She was director K. Balachander's regular actress and they went on to work in films such as Iru Kodugal, Bama Vijayam, Ethir Neechal, Punnagai, Velli Vizha and Kanna Nalama. She acted with Jayalalithaa and Manorama in Mugaraasi. The song Aadhi Naadan Ketkindraan picturised on her sung by TMS-Janaki was very popular.

During the late 1970s and the 1980s Jayanthi starred in many Kannada movies that required a slightly mature actress, often paired with Srinivasa Murthy and Prabhakar.

== Personal life ==
Jayanthi was married to film director and actor Peketi Sivaram for a few years and then the couple separated. On 27 March 2018, it was falsely reported by several media houses that actress Jayanthi had died. While her fans took to social media to offer their condolences, her family members refuted the rumors as false. The then 73-year-old actress complained of breathing difficulties and was admitted to a private hospital in Bengaluru and was recuperating and responding well to the treatment.

== Other works ==
In 2009, she gave her voice to an HIV/AIDS education animated software tutorial created by the nonprofit organization TeachAids.

== Political stint ==
In 1998, Jayanthi contested the Lok Sabha election from Chikkaballapur, securing over 3 lakh votes despite her defeat. In 1999, She subsequently contested the Koratagere Assembly constituency and the 2004 Lok Sabha election, but was unsuccessful in both. Following three consecutive electoral defeats, she withdrew from active politics.

== Death ==
Jayanthi died on 26 July 2021 at the age of 76, due to age related ailments at her residence in Bengaluru.

== Awards ==
Padmabhushan Dr. B. Sarojadevi National Award, 2017
Karnataka State Film Awards

- 1973–74: Best Actress — Edakallu Guddada Mele
- 1976–77: Best Actress — Manassinanthe Mangalya
- 1981–82: Best Actress — Dharma Dari Thappithu
- 1985–86: Best Actress — Masanada Hoovu
- 1986–87: Best Supporting Actress — Anand
- 1998–99: Best Supporting Actress — Tuvvi Tuvvi Tuvvi
- 2005–06: Dr. Rajkumar Lifetime Achievement Award

Filmfare Awards South

- 1973: Best Actress – Kannada — Edakallu Guddada Mele
- 1976: Best Actress – Kannada — Thulasi

== Partial filmography ==
=== Kannada films ===
- Jenu Goodu (1963)
- Sri Ramanjaneya Yuddha (1963)
- Chandavalliya Thota (1964)
- Kalaavati (1964)
- Tumbida Koda (1964)
- Muriyada Mane (1964)
- Prathigne (1964)
- Pathiye Daiva (1964)
- Kavaleradu Kula Ondu (1965)
- Beratha Jeeva (1965)
- Vaatsalya (1965)
- Bettada Huli (1965)
- Miss Leelavathi (1965)
- Mamatheya Bandhana (1966)
- Endu Ninnavane (1966)
- Mantralaya Mahatme (1966)
- Mahaashilpi (1966)
- Deva Maanava (1966)
- Kiladi Ranga (1966)
- Onde Balliya Hoogalu (1967)
- Anuradha (1967)
- Nakkare Ade Swarga (1967)
- Kallu Sakkare (1967)
- Miss Bangalore (1967)
- Lagna Pathrike (1967)
- Muddu Meena (1967)
- Rajadurgada Rahasya (1967)
- Devara Gedda Manava (1967)
- Manassiddare Marga (1967)
- Chakratheertha (1967)
- Immadi Pulikeshi (1967)
- Jedara Bale (1968)
- Mateye Maha Mandira (1968)
- Bangalore Mail (1968)
- Rowdi Ranganna (1968)
- Simhaswapna (1968)
- Broker Bheeshmachari (1969)
- Bhale Basava (1969)
- Eradu Mukha (1969)
- Choori Chikkanna (1969)
- Bhaagirathi (1969)
- Punarjanma (1969)
- Maduve Maduve Maduve (1969)
- Bhale Raja (1969)
- Ade Hrudaya Ade Mamathe (1969)
- Chikkamma (1969)
- Gruhalakshmi (1969)
- Bhale Basava (1969)
- Sri Krishnadevaraya (1970)
- Kanneeru (1970)
- Sedige Sedu (1970)
- Nanna Thamma (1970)
- Baalu Belagithu (1970)
- Devara Makkalu (1970)
- Paropakari (1970)
- Sidila Mari (1971)
- Kasturi Nivasa (1971)
- Thande Makkalu (1971)
- Kula Gourava (1971)
- Sedina Kidi (1971)
- Samshaya Phala (1971)
- Kalyani (1971)
- Baala Bandhana (1971)
- Malathi Madhava (1971)
- Vishakanye (1972)
- Ondu Hennina Kathe (1972)
- Kranti Veera (1972)
- Nanda Gokula (1972)
- Devaru Kotta Thangi (1973)
- Bharatada Ratna (1973)
- Jaya Vijaya (1973)
- Edakallu Guddada Mele (1973)
- Mooruvare Vajragalu (1973)
- Mannina Magalu (1974)
- Kasturi Vijaya (1975)
- Devaru Kotta Vara (1976)
- Baduku Bangaravayithu (1976)
- Bahaddur Gandu (1976)
- Mangalya bhagya (1976)
- Thulasi (1976)
- Devara Duddu (1977)
- Manassinanthe Mangalya (1977)
- Chinna Ninna Muddaduve (1977)
- Shrimanthana Magalu (1977)
- Banashankari (1977)
- Shubhashaya (1977)
- Ganda Hendathi (1977)
- Sridevi (1978)
- Balina Guri (1979)
- Vijay Vikram (1979)
- Mallige Sampige (1979)
- Janma Janmada Anubandha (1980)
- Vajrada Jalapatha (1980)
- Leader Vishwanath (1981)
- Bhakta Gnanadeva (1982)
- Nanna Devaru (1982) (guest appearance)
- Kallu Veene Nudiyithu (1983)
- Banker Margayya (1983)
- Keralida Hennu (1983)
- Shubha Muhurtha (1984)
- Benki Birugali (1984)
- Tayi Nadu (1984)
- Masanada Hoovu (1985)
- Shiva Kotta Sowbhagya (1985)
- Agni Pareekshe (1985)
- Thayiye Nanna Devaru (1986)
- Anand (1986)
- Lancha Lancha Lancha (1986)
- Usha (1986)
- Mukhavaada (1987)
- Thayi Kotta Thali (1987)
- Thayi Karulu (1988)
- Matrudevobhava (1988)
- Nee Nanna Daiva (1988)
- En Swamy Aliyandire (1989)
- Sri Satyanarayana Puja Phala (1990)
- Sundara Kanda (1991)
- Belli Modagalu (1992)
- Gruhalakshmi (1992)
- Jana Mechida Maga (1993)
- Navibbaru Namagibbaru (1993)
- Megha Maale (1994)
- Rasika (1995)
- Mojugara Sogasugara (1995)
- Gajanura Gandu (1996)
- Patela (1999)
- Andhra Hendthi (2000)
- Mahalakshmi (2001)
- Baava Baamaida (2001)
- Neela (2001)
- Olu Saar Bari Olu (2002)
- Shri Kalikamba (2003)
- Savira Mettilu (2006)
- Jambada Hudugi (2007)
- Bindaas Hudugi (2010)
- Sri Kshetra Adi Chunchanagiri (2012)
- Koormavatara (2013)
- Vasundhara (2014)

=== Telugu films ===
This list is incomplete; you can help by expanding it.

- Sahasra Siracheda Apoorva Chintamani (Credited as 'Kamalakumari') (1960) as Sundaravalli
- Bharya Bhartalu (1961)
- Jagadeka Veeruni Katha (1961)
- Swarna Manjari (1962)
- Madana Kamaraju Katha (1962) as Mandharavalli
- Gaali Medalu (1962)
- Vishnu Maya (1963)
- Doctor Chakravarty (1964)
- Thotalo Pilla Kotalo Rani (1964) as Raagavathi
- Bobbili Yuddham (1964)
- Aggi Pidugu (1964)
- Dorikithe Dongalu (1965)
- Sumangali (1965)
- Paduka Pattabhishekam (1966) as Urmila
- Rahasyam (1967)
- Bhakta Prahlada (1967)
- Bandipotu Dongalu (1968)
- Devudichchina Bharta (1968)
- Veeranjaneya (1968) as Satyabhama
- Bhale Kodallu (1968)
- Badi Panthulu (1972)
- Collector Janaki (1972)
- Kula Gowravam (1972)
- Mayadari Malligadu (1973) as Pankajam
- Sarada (1973)
- Samsaram Sagaram (1973)
- Gandhi Puttina Desam (1973)
- Bangaru Babu (1973)
- Devadasu (1974)
- Amma Manasu (1974)
- Devudu Chesina Pelli (1974)
- Mangalya bhagyam (1974) as Vasanthi
- Challani Thalli (1975)
- Bhagasthulu (1975) as Lakshmi
- Ramayya Thandri (1975)
- Chinninati Kalalu (1975)
- Andaroo Manchivare (1975)
- Sri Ramanjaneya Yuddham (1975)
- Aadavalu Apanindhalu (1976)
- Bommarillu (1978)
- Kumara Raja (1978)
- Bottu Kaatuka (1979)
- Kamalamma Kamatam (1979)
- Anthuleni Vintha Katha (1979) as Savithri
- Talli Badhyatha (1980)
- Kondaveeti Simham (1981)
- Parvati Parameshwarulu (1981)
- Agni Poolu (1981)
- Justice Chowdary (1982)
- Rakta Sambandham (1984)
- Santhi Nivasam (1986)
- Kutra (1986) as Vyjayanthi
- Dhairyavanthudu (1986)
- Kaliyuga Pandavulu (1986)
- Donga Mogudu (1987)
- Dongodochadu (1987) as Lakshmi Devi
- Allari Krishnaiah (1987)
- Maavoori Magaadu (1987)
- Aakhari Poratam (1988)
- Kodama Simham (1990)
- Muddula Menalludu (1990)
- Raja Vikramarka (1990)
- Talli Tandrulu (1991)
- Vidhata (1991) as Sarada
- Swati Kiranam (1992)
- Gharana Bullodu (1995)
- Mayabazaar (1995)
- Pedarayudu (1995)
- Vamshanikokkadu (1996)
- Nalla Pussalu (1996)
- Ramudochadu (1996)
- Rowdy Durbar (1997)
- Priyamaina Srivaru (1997)
- Kante Koothurne Kanu (1998)
- Bala Veerulu (1999)
- Raghavayya Gari Abbayi (2000)
- Girl Friend (2002)
- Neeke Manasichaanu (2003) as Janaki
- 786 Khaidi Premakatha (2005)

=== Tamil films ===
This list is incomplete; you can help by expanding it.

- Yanai Paagan (1960)
- Mangaiyar Ullam Mangatha Selvam (1962)
- Ninaipadharku Neramillai (1963)
- Iruvar Ullam (1963)
- Manthiri Kumaran (1963)
- Annai Illam (1963)
- Padagotti (1964)
- Vazhi Piranthadu (1964)
- Karnan (1964)
- Kalai Kovil (1964)
- Veeraadhi Veeran (1964)
- Neerkumizhi (1965)
- Mugaraasi (1966) as Malliga
- Karthigai Deepam (1965)
- Kathal Paduthum Padu (1966) as Maya
- Bama Vijayam (1967)
- Bhakta Prahlada (1967)
- Ethir Neechal (1968)
- Iru Kodugal (1969)
- Nil Gavani Kadhali (1969)
- Punnagai (1971)
- Nootrukku Nooru (1971)
- Pudhiya Vazhkai (1971)
- Kanna Nalama (1972)
- Velli Vizha (1972)
- Ganga Gowri (1973)
- Pennai Nambungal (1973)
- Manipayal (1973)
- Nalla Mudivu (1973)
- Shanmugapriya (1973)
- Ellorum Nallavare (1975)
- Kula Gauravam (1976)
- Devadhai (1979)
- Komberi Mookan (1984)
- Mappillai Sir (1988)
- Naanum Indha Ooruthan (1990)
- Palaivana Paravaigal (1990)
- Sir I Love You (1991)
- Rajadhi Raja Raja Kulothunga Raja Marthanda Raja Gambeera Kathavaraya Krishna Kamarajan (1993)
- Veettaippaaru Nattaippaaru (1994)
- Maindhan (1994)
- Gopala Gopala (1996)
- Sengottai (1996)
- Pudhalvan (1997)
- House Full (1999)
- Annai Kaligambal (2003)

=== Malayalam films ===
- Palattu Koman (1962)
- Kattupookkal (1965)
- Kaliyodam (1965)
- Lakshaprabhu (1968)
- Karutha Pournami (1968)
- Vilakkappetta Kani (1974)
- Oridathoru Phayalvaan (1981)

=== Hindi films ===
- Lal Bangla (1966)
- Teen Bahuraniyan (1968)
- Tumse Achha Kaun Hai (1969)
- Goonda (1970)
- Ek Gaon Ki Kahani (1975)

=== English shows ===
- Brown Nation (2016)

=== TV serials ===
- Vasantham (2009–2010) as Mangalam (Tamil)
- Amrutha Varshini as Janaki Devi (Kannada)
- Onde Goodina Halligalu (Kannada)
