= Enna Muthalali Sowkiyama =

- Theatrical release poster
- Directed by: Malliyam Rajagopal
- Screenplay by: Malliyam Rajagopal
- Story by: Kannadasan
- Produced by: D. K. Sankar
- Starring: Gemini Ganesan; K. R. Vijaya
- Cinematography: Nemai Ghosh
- Edited by: R. Devarajan
- Music by: M. S. Viswanathan
- Production company: Anna Productions
- Release date: 11 February 1972
- Country: India
- Language: Tamil

Enna Muthalali Sowkiyama (transl. Hey boss, how are you?) is a 1972 Indian Tamil-language film directed by Malliyam Rajagopal and produced by D. K. Sankar under Anna Productions. The film stars Gemini Ganesan and K. R. Vijaya. It was released on 11 February 1972.

== Plot ==
Koteeswaram is a textile mill owner whose goondas murder Muthiah, secretary of the mill labour union, for demanding a bonus and declaring a strike. Muthiah's daughter Jaya, a medical student, is in love with Koteeswaram's son without knowing his identity. Another worker is arrested for Muthiah's murder and his son Sethu and Jaya vow to find out the murderer of Muthiah. Koteeswaram is finally brought to book.

== Cast ==
- Gemini Ganesan
- K. R. Vijaya
- Major Sundarrajan
- Nagesh
- Jayabharathi
- T. R. Ramachandran
- V. S. Raghavan
- M. R. R. Vasu
- Gandhimathi
- M. Bhanumathi
- Vijaya Lalitha
- Aalam

== Themes ==
Enna Muthalali Sowkiyama deals with labour unrest.

== Soundtrack ==
The soundtrack was composed by M. S. Viswanathan.

Track listing
No.	Title	Singer(s)	Length
1.	"Enna Mudalali Sowkkiyama"	L. R. Eswari
2.	"Anbai Kurippadu"	S. P. Balasubrahmanyam, Sarala
3.	"Vaadi Vaadi"	T. M. Soundararajan
4.	"Nalla Kaariyam"	L. R. Eswari
5.	"Egypt Nattin"

== Reception ==
A writer for Film World said the film's message was conveyed in a "half-hearted" manner by the director, and that the cast performances were its only saving grace.
