= Brother of the Wind =

1972 film

Brother of the Wind is a 1972 independent film directed by and starring Richard Robinson from a screenplay by John Mahon and John Champion. A mountain man saves four wolf cubs after their mother dies.

== Reception ==
The film was released by Sun International and earned theatrical rentals of $12 million in the United States and Canada.
