= Dhairyavanthudu =

- Theatrical poster
- Directed by: Lakshmi Deepak
- Written by: Maddipaatla Suri; Madhu; S.S. Rao (dialogues)
- Screenplay by: Lakshmi Deepak
- Story by: Lakshmi Deepak
- Produced by: Yaxs Swamy; Ram Deepak
- Starring: Chiranjeevi; Vijayashanti; Sitara
- Cinematography: Satti Babu
- Edited by: K. A. Marthand
- Music by: Ramesh Naidu
- Production company: Deepak Raj Pictures
- Release date: 27 November 1986
- Running time: 137 mins
- Country: India
- Language: Telugu

Dhairyavanthudu (transl. Daring Man) is a 1986 Telugu-language drama film, produced by Yaxs Swamy and Ram Deepak under the Deepak Raj Pictures banner and directed by Lakshmi Deepak. It stars Chiranjeevi, Vijayashanti and Sitara, with music composed by Ramesh Naidu.

== Plot ==
Kishore (Chiranjeevi) is an unemployed graduate. He lives with his brother Srinivasa Rao, who works in Harshavardhan's company. When Kishore attends his friend's marriage, he sees Radha (Sitara), daughter of a retired army official. Samrat, who has an eye on Harshavardhan's property, wants to marry his daughter. When Lavanya (Vijayashanti) returns from abroad after completing her studies, she is kidnapped by Samrat, but is saved by Kishore. In the fight that follows, Kishore loses his memory. Even when Radha comes to see him, he couldn't recognize her. In another attempt, Samrat and his men strike again and this time, Kishore gains back his memory, but Radha is killed. Later, Kishore is taken care of by Harshavardhan and Lavanya starts assisting him. They start loving each other. Kishore thinks of a plan and tapes the talk between Samrat and his men, which prove their crimes. The police arrest them and Kishore marries Lavanya to end the movie.

== Soundtrack ==
Soundtrack was composed by Ramesh Naidu.

- "Rusarusa" - S. P. Balasubrahmanyam
- "Tamaku Tamaku" - SPB, S. P. Sailaja
- "Kougili" - SPB, P. Susheela
- "Amma Varalakshmi" - P. Susheela
- "Nenu Gonthethi" - SPB
- "Atu Musire" - SPB
