= Kumari Padmini =

Actress active in Tamil films during the 1960s and '70s

- Born: Padmini; Chennai, Tamil Nadu, India
- Died: 1980; Chennai, Tamil Nadu, India
- Occupation: Actress
- Years active: 1964–1980

Kumari Padmini, born as Padmini (died 1980), was an actress who was active in Tamil, Telugu, and Malayalam film industry during the 1960s and '70s.

== Bio ==
Kumari Padmini acted mainly in Tamil films. She was also popular in Telugu and Malayalam films. She died by suicide.

== Partial filmography ==
=== Tamil ===
- Chitrangi (1964)
- Neela Vaanam (1965), as Thilagam
- Annavin Aasai (1966)
- Ragasiya Police 115 (1968), as Parvathi
- Vaa Raja Vaa (1969)
- Manasatchi (1969)
- Mahizampoo (1969)
- Naangu Killadigal (1969), as Prema
- Athaimagal (1969)
- Dharisanam (1970)
- Thirumalai Thenkumari (1970), as Geetha
- Kankatchi (1971)
- Kanna Nalama (1972), as Santha
- Agathiyar (1972)
- Dharmam Enge (1972)
- Vasantha Maligai (1972)
- Rajapart Rangadurai (1973), as Vasanthi
- Rajaraja Cholan (1973)
- Amman Arul (1973)
- Deiva Kuzhanthaigal (1973)
- Nalla Mudivu (1973)
- Ganga Gowri (1973)
- Nee Ullavarai (1973)
- Engal Thaai (1973)
- Veetu Mappilai (1973)
- School Master (1973)
- Karaikkal Ammaiyar (1973), as Bhakyalakshmi
- Roshakkari (1974)
- Kadavul Mama (1974)
- Pillai Selvam (1974)
- Thaai (1974) as Kaveri
- Devi Sri Karumari Amman (1974)
- Athaiya Mamiya (1974)
- Kanmani Raja (1974)
- Andharangam (1975)
- Ippadiyum Oru Penn (1975)
- Hotel Sorgam (1975)
- Thiyaga Ullam (1975)
- Uzhaikkum Karangal (1976), as Gowri
- Oorukku Uzhaippavan (1976), as Kumudha/Rita/Radha
- Inspector Manaivi (1976)
- Avargal (1977), as Rajathi
- Navarathinam (1977), as Vahuduriyam

=== Malayalam ===
- Kattupookkal (1965)
- Kalyana Photo (1965)
- Muthalali (1965), as Malathi
- Velutha Kathreena (1968)
- Velliyazhcha (1969)
- Adimakal (1969), as Meenakshi
