= Thulasi (1976 film) =

- Directed by: K. S. L. Swamy
- Produced by: Pyramid Natarajan
- Starring: Kalyan Kumar; Jayanthi; Srinath; Manjula
- Cinematography: B. Purushottham
- Music by: Vijaya Bhaskar
- Release date: 1976
- Country: India
- Language: Kannada

Thulasi is a 1976 Indian Kannada film, directed and produced by K. S. L. Swamy. The film stars Kalyan Kumar, Jayanthi, Srinath and Manjula in the lead roles. The film has musical score by Vijaya Bhaskar.

== Cast ==
- Kalyan Kumar
- Jayanthi
- Srinath
- Manjula
- S. Shivaram
