= Kanna Nalama =

- Directed by: K. Balachander
- Screenplay by: K. Balachander
- Story by: Madhusudhan
- Produced by: Muthaiah; Arunachalam
- Starring: Gemini Ganesan; Jayanthi; Major Sundarrajan; Kumari Padmini; S. V. Sahasranamam
- Cinematography: N. Balakrishnan
- Edited by: N. R. Kittu
- Music by: M. S. Viswanathan
- Production company: Rathnasabapathi Films
- Release date: 12 January 1972
- Running time: 158 minutes
- Country: India
- Language: Tamil

Kanna Nalama (transl. Are you well, darling?) is a 1972 Indian Tamil language film, written and directed by K. Balachander. The film stars Gemini Ganesan and Jayanthi, with Major Sundarrajan, Manorama and V. S. Raghavan in supporting roles. It was released on 12 January 1972.

== Plot ==
Gemini and Jeyathi are a childless couple. After several years of prayers they were blessed with a boy. While Jeyanthi was in the hospital for delivery, an earthquake occurs and her baby Raju is unknowingly exchanged with another, Babu. One day when Gemini goes from Trichy to Madras for a meeting with his boss Major Sundarrajan, Sundarrajan claimed that Gemini resembled his own son. At first he doubts his wife and then Gemini found that their children were exchanged. Sundarrajan came to Gemini's house to exchange their children. At first they did not accept but finally agreed to exchange. When Babu comes to meet his mother, he is killed in a car accident. The Sundarans then kept Raju.

After Raju went with his father he found he was unable to live with them. He falls sick and Jeyanthi loses her memory. Doctors are unable to help him and ask his mother to come. As soon as Jeyathi arrives, Raju is cured and Sundaran's family sends Raju to Gemini and Jeyanthi.

== Cast ==
- Gemini Ganesan as Anand
- Jayanthi as Seetha
- Major Sundarrajan as Sattanathan
- S. V. Sahasranamam as Sattanathan's Family Doctor
- Kumari Padmini as Santha
- M. R. R. Vasu as Manorama's Husband
- Manorama as K. Manorama
- V. S. Raghavan as Lawyer
- Master Prabhakar as Mani
- T. K. S. Natarajan as House rent collector
- Hari Krishnan as Doctor
- G. Dhanapal
- I. S. R.
- R. R. Gopal
- Gemini Mahalingam
- Aaraavamudhan
- Subbiah
- Thangaraj
- Master Sekar
- Master Ramu as Jayanthi's Son
- Master Viswesvar Rao as Mani

== Soundtrack ==
The music was composed by M. S. Viswanathan, with lyrics by Kannadasan.

Song	Singers
"Naan Ketten"	P. Susheela
"Petredutha Ullam"	T. M. Soundararajan, P. Susheela
"Pakkathu Rajavukku"	L. R. Eswari

== Reception ==
Film World gave the film a favourable review, appreciating the writing and direction of Balachander.
