= Gemini Ganesan =

Indian actor (1920–2005)

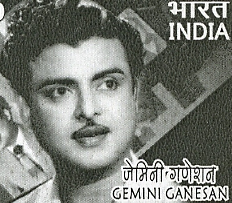
- Ganesan on a 2006 stamp of India
- Born: Ramasamy Ganesan; 17 November 1920; Pudukottai, Pudukkottai State, British India (present day: Pudukottai, Tamil Nadu, India)
- Died: 22 March 2005 (aged 84); Chennai, Tamil Nadu, India
- Education: Madras Christian College
- Occupation: Actor
- Years active: 1947–2004
- Works: Full list
- Spouses: Alamelu (1940–2005); Savitri (1952–1981)
- Partners: Pushpavalli (1946–1955); Juliana Andrew (1997–2005)
- Children: 4 with Alamelu, including Kamala Selvaraj; 2 with Pushpavalli, including Rekha (daughter); 2 with Savitri

Ramasamy Ganesan (17 November 1920 – 22 March 2005), better known by his stage name Gemini Ganesan, was an Indian actor who worked mainly in Tamil cinema. He was referred to as Kaadhal Mannan (King of Romance) for his romantic roles in films. Ganesan was one of the "three biggest names of Tamil cinema", the other two being M. G. Ramachandran and Sivaji Ganesan. While Sivaji Ganesan excelled in dramatic films and M. G. Ramachandran was popular as an action hero, Gemini Ganesan was known for his romantic films. A recipient of the Padma Shri in 1971, he had also won several other awards including the Kalaimamani, the MGR Gold Medal, and the Screen Lifetime Achievement Award. He was one of the few college graduates to enter the film industry then.

Gemini Ganesan made his debut with Miss Malini in 1947 but was noticed only after playing the villain in Thai Ullam in 1952. After playing the lead role in Manam Pola Mangalyam (1953), he finally acquired star status. However, unlike Sivaji Ganesan or Ramachandran, Gemini Ganesan was not a stage performer and was never involved in politics. In a film career spanning over five decades, Ganesan acted in more than 200 films. His performances on the screen were enhanced by successful playback singers such as A. M. Rajah and P. B. Sreenivas. Despite his celebrated film career, Ganesan's personal life, particularly his marriages to multiple women over the years, including famous Indian actress Savitri, has often been a subject of criticism. He had eight children with three wives, including actress Rekha, with Pushpavalli.

== Early life ==
Gemini Ganesan was born as Ramasamy Ganesan into a Devadasi family of Pudukkottai in 1920. He was the son of Ramaswamy and the Nautch girl Gangammal. Ganesan's paternal grandfather, Narayanaswami Iyer, was the principal of the Maharajah's College, Pudukkottai. After the death of his first wife, Narayanaswami had a second marriage with Chandramma, a devadasi who worked as a musician and dancer in a local Hindu temple. Notable among Narayanaswami Iyer's children with Chandramma were Muthulakshmi Reddy and Ramaswamy , the father of Gemini Ganesan.

When Ganesan was in the sixth grade, his grandfather died, and not long after that, his father also died. Meanwhile, Muthulakshmi (now known as Muthulakshmi Reddy) had studied well and become a doctor; she was affluent and educated and had thoroughly abandoned the style of life followed by her mother and maternal ancestors, so much so that she became the leader of a social reform movement aimed at eradicating the Devadasi system. She was instrumental in ensuring the passage through parliament of the Devadasi Abolition Act. After the death of his father, Ganesan and his mother Bhagirathi moved to his aunt Muthulakshmi's home in Madras (now known as Chennai).

Muthulakshmi provided shelter to her mother Chandramma and also to Bhagirathi and Ganesan, but she was very dismissive and insulting towards her destitute relatives, and she felt ashamed of them because of their background as nautch girls. She heaped many insults on the two widowed women and ensured that they did not show their faces to any guests who visited the house. Unhappy with the situation, Chandramma and Bhagirathi returned to Pudukkottai. However, they left Ganesan with his aunt, so he would grow into an educated and respectable man.

=== Education ===
Since Muthulakshmi was an ardent follower of Ramakrishna, she decided to enroll Ganesan into Ramakrishna Mission Home. While there, he was taught yoga and languages and was made to read the Bhagavad Gita. However, he could not bear being separated from his mother, who was in Pudukkottai, so he returned to his native place and studied at a high school there. Later on, he joined Maharajah's College, located in the same place. However, he completed his graduation from Madras Christian College, Chennai.

=== Early work ===
Ganesan's dream was to become a doctor. In April 1940, he went to Trichinopoly (now Tiruchirappalli) to see T. R. Alamelu. Alamelu's father proposed to his daughter in marriage and promised him a medical seat after graduation. Ganesan immediately agreed and married Alamelu in June 1940. Alamelu lost her father and elder sister within one month of her marriage. Ganesan's dreams of becoming a doctor were shattered. There was no choice left for him but to find a job immediately, as he was the only person to support his family. He got an interview from the Indian Air Force. Much against Alamelu's wishes, Ganesan went to Delhi. There, he met his uncle Narayanaswami who advised him to become a teacher. Finally, Ganesan worked as a lecturer in the Chemistry department of Madras Christian College. Later in 1947, he obtained work as a production executive in Gemini Studios, from where the title "Gemini" became prefixed to his name. He debuted in film from the casting department of the Studio itself.

== Career ==
=== Initial years ===
From the casting department, Ganesan made his film debut in 1947 with the satire Miss Malini, in a minor role. The film, which was based on a story by R. K. Narayan, and cast him alongside his future Mistress Pushpavalli, was a box office failure as it was considered "ahead of its time", but was well received by intellectuals. No print of that film is known to survive, making it a lost film. This was followed by Chakradhari, in which he played another minor role as the Hindu god Krishna. The film was a box office success, but his performance went unnoticed. It was not until 1953 when he played a negative role in Thai Ullam, did people take notice of him as an actor. The next year, he appeared in a supporting role in the Gemini Studios film Moondru Pillaigal, which was unsuccessful. He was then cast as a hero for the first time with Manam Pola Mangalyam. The film, which featured him in a dual role, paired him with his future wife Savitri, and became a "milestone in his life". From then on, he carved out a niche for himself in Tamil cinema with films that favored romance over action.

=== Stardom in the south ===
In a career spanning nearly 50 years, Ganesan played a variety of roles, from Abhimanyu in Mayabazar (1957), to resistance fighter Madasamy in Kappalottiya Thamizhan (1961), and Pennin Perumai (1956), he played a "non-assertive imbecile morphing into a well-molded human being". Ganesan also starred in Kalathur Kannamma (1959), which was also the debut for Kamal Haasan, who later became one of the leading actors in Tamil cinema. The film won the Certificate of Merit for the Third Best Feature Film in 1961. Ganesan also starred in Veerapandiya Kattabomman (1959), alongside Sivaji Ganesan. The film was selected for the Afro-Asian Film Festival in 1960. It was also nominated for the National Film Award in 1960, along with Gemini Ganesan's Kalyana Parisu, but both lost to Bhaaga Pirivinai. The Ruritanian romance film Vanjikottai Valiban (1958) was a high-budget film and became a large commercial success due to much hype. The historical fiction film Parthiban Kanavu (1960) won the President's silver medal for Best Feature Film, but failed commercially.

In 1958 was booked by M. G. Ramachandran for his second directorial venture Ponniyin Selvan. One of the first screen adaptations of Kalki Krishnamurthy's Ponniyin Selvan, the film had a huge ensemble cast consisting of Vyjayanthimala, Savitri, Padmini, Saroja Devi, M. N. Rajam and Nagesh, M.N. Nambiar. In the film, he was given the role of Arulmozhivarman. However, in mid-1958 the film was shelved for unknown reasons.

Ganesan's 1961 film Then Nilavu, was the first Tamil film to be shot extensively in Jammu and Kashmir, and became a major box-office success. He co-starred with rival actor M. G. Ramachandran in Mugarasi (1966), which was their only film together. Konjum Salangai (1962), which featured Ganesan alongside Savithri was released in various countries outside India, having subtitles in over 22 languages, and it was also the first Tamil film to be released in Poland, in a dubbed version. Ganesan produced Naan Avan Illai (1974), in which he played a womaniser. Directed by K. Balachander, this film won critical praise for Ganesan's performance, but according to Ganesan, the film did not succeed commercially. His other known works include Missiamma, School Master, Kanavane Kankanda Deivam, Meenda Sorgam, Shanti Nilayam, Vaazhkai Padagu, Karpagam, Ramu, Thamarai Nenjam and Punnagai. Ganesan had paired with several leading actresses like Anjali Devi, Pushpavalli, Padmini, Vyjayanthimala, Savitri, Devika, Vijayakumari, Saroja Devi, Rajasree, Kanchana, Jayanthi, K. R. Vijaya, Bharathi and Jayalalithaa.

=== Bollywood career ===
Gemini Ganesan acted in a few Hindi films, most of which were remakes of his Tamil films. He played the lead role in Devta, the Hindi version of his own Tamil film Kanavaney Kankanda Deivam. Missiamma's remake Miss Mary (1957), which became one of the biggest Indian hits of that year. He also acted in the Ruritanian epic film Raj Tilak (1958), based on his own Vanjikottai Valiban. It was a box office failure, having collapsed within a week of its release. He later appeared in a guest role in Nazrana (1961), the Hindi remake of his own Kalyana Parisu. Though the film was an average grosser, it was the 12th highest-grossing film of the year.

=== Later years ===
Later in his career, Ganesan switched to character roles, most notably the Telugu film Rudraveena (1988), its Tamil remake Unnal Mudiyum Thambi (1988), and Avvai Shanmughi (1996), in which he played the role of an old man longing for the titular main character unaware of her actual gender. Near the end of his acting career, he chose to act mainly in television serials, most notably Krishnadasi. Ganesan also appeared in Mettukudi (1996), Kaalamellam Kadhal Vaazhga (1997), Thodarum (1998), and his last major role came the same year with Naam Iruvar Namakku Iruvar, followed by special appearances in Gemini (2002) and Adi Thadi (2004).

=== Other work ===
Unlike Sivaji Ganesan and M. G. Ramachandran, Gemini Ganesan was not originally a theatre actor, thus making his acting "refreshingly credible". Though he interacted cordially with fans, he avoided promoting fan clubs. Ganesan abstained from politics to the point of refusing a Rajya Sabha MP offer by Rajiv Gandhi. The only time he even barely approached politics was in 1963 when he organized a function for Subramania Bharati at Ettayapuram. Apart from acting, Ganesan was also a businessman and invested heavily in real estate and property development. He was skilled in various sports such as tennis, golf, and badminton, and captained his college's cricket team. Ganesan also directed the film Idhaya Malar (1976).

== Acclaim and criticism ==
Gemini Ganesan has widely been praised for his versatility in acting, having performed a "wide range of roles". He was "at his best" with Savitri, with whom he had acted in several successful films. In February 2006, Dayanidhi Maran had released a commemorative postage stamp of the actor, whom he described as a "multi-dimensional personality, who evinced keen interest in Carnatic music, reading, yoga and poetry." He is also credited for having introduced leading Tamil actor Kamal Haasan to Kalathur Kannamma, where the latter was a child artist. Ganesan also took part in a World Tamil Conference in Kuala Lumpur, notably because he "loved Tamil language". According to politician M. Karunanidhi, the actor had developed a "reformer's mind" because he was raised by his aunt Muthulakshmi Reddy, who fought for the abolition of the devadasi system. Director K. Balachander called Ganesan a "director's delight" and stated that "The advantage of having him as a hero was that he was convinced about the capabilities of a director, he would leave it to the director and would not interfere". Lyricist Vairamuthu said: "'Gemini' Ganesan was not envious of anyone and promoted many actors by recommending them to producers and directors".

Despite being one of the most successful actors of Tamil cinema during his time, Gemini Ganesan was criticized for being "fossilized in one type of portrayal", as most of his films were typical "boy meets girl" romantic films. His hostile relationship with his daughter Rekha was also criticised. He did not acknowledge Rekha's paternity during her childhood. It was in the early 1970s, when Rekha was looking for a career in Bollywood, that she revealed her origins. Later, at the peak of her career, Rekha told an interviewer that her father's neglect still rankled and that she had ignored his efforts at reconciliation. She did not attend Ganesan's funeral in 2005.

== Personal life ==
Gemini Ganesan married Alamelu when he was 19 years old, with whom he lived and whom he fondly called "Boubji". He later married the actress Savitri while still married to his first wife, because polygamy was allowed for Hindu men till 1956. He had several extramarital affairs, as well as an illegal marriage with Juliana Andrew in July 1998. Alamelu and Ganesan had four daughters; three of them – Revathi, Kamala and Jayalakshmi – are medical doctors, the fourth – Narayani – is a journalist with The Times of India. Ganesan had two other daughters with the married actress Pushpavalli: Bollywood actress Rekha, and Radha. The latter acted in a few Tamil films but then opted for marriage and emigration to the United States. Savitri and Ganesan had two children: a daughter named Vijaya Chamundeswari, and Ganesan's only son Satheesh Kumar. Gemini Ganesan noted in his autobiography Vaazhkai Padagu: "Somehow, I seemed to attract women who were in distress." He also felt annoyed by the title "Kaadhal Mannan" as it "was used to brush him in black in his personal life". He was survived by his seven daughters and one son. Chamundeswari has a son Abhinay Vaddi, who acted in Ramanujan (2014), and is therefore Ganesan's grandson.

== Legacy ==
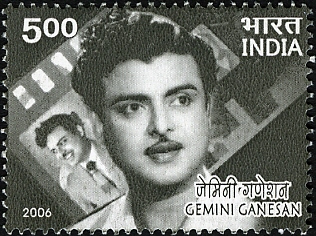
Gemini Ganesan 2006 stamp of India

A documentary film on the legend in the name of Kadhal Mannan was produced by Dr. Kamala Selvaraj and directed by Ashok Kumar, DFT (Programme Head-Vendhar TV) in 2011. It was screened by many film stalwarts and fans of the legend and received rave reviews from critics for bringing out a candid representation of the actor's life in detail. Following the response, a DVD version of the film was released in the same year. In the mid-2010s, three films were made about the actor. Odam Ilavarasu's romantic comedy Gemini Ganeshanum Suruli Raajanum (2017) began in 2015 and featured the lead character as someone who falls in love with several women at the same time. Muthukumar's Kaadhal Mannan (2018) was initially titled Gemini Ganesan before the makers decided to change the title. Furthermore, an official biopic of actress Savitri was made by director Nag Ashwin in Telugu as Mahanati. Dulquer Salmaan was cast as Ganesan, and Ashwin revealed that the portrayal of Gemini Ganesan would be beyond physical resemblance, to better depict the character's emotional side.

== Death ==
After a prolonged illness due to kidney failure and multiple organ failure, Gemini Ganesan died surrounded by Bobji and their daughters at his residence on 22 March 2005, 13:30 IST. He was cremated with full state honors. Prominent personalities including Tamil Nadu's chief minister Jayalalitha and former chief minister M. Karunanidhi paid their last respects to the veteran actor. Ganesan's funeral was not attended by his estranged daughter Rekha, who was then in Himachal Pradesh shooting a film.

== Accolades ==
Year	Award	Film	Result	References
1970	Tamil Nadu State Film Award for Best Actor	Kaaviya Thalaivi	Won	
1971	Padma Shri	-	Won	
1974	Filmfare Award for Best Tamil Actor	Naan Avanillai	Won	
1990	Tamil Nadu State Film Honorary Award – MGR Award	-	Won	
1993	Filmfare Lifetime Achievement Award – South	-	Won	
-	MGR Gold Medal	-	Won	
-	Screen Lifetime Achievement Award	-	Won	
-	Kalaimamani Award	-	Won	
