= Avasara Police 100 =

- Poster
- Directed by: K. Bhagyaraj
- Written by: K. Bhagyaraj
- Produced by: S. Duraisamy
- Starring: M. G. Ramachandran; K. Bhagyaraj; Gautami; Silk Smitha
- Cinematography: V. Ramamoorthy
- Edited by: A. P. Manivannan
- Music by: M. S. Viswanathan; K. Bhagyaraj
- Production company: Sudha Cine Movies
- Release date: 17 October 1990
- Country: India
- Language: Tamil

Avasara Police 100 (transl. Emergency Police:100) is a 1990 Indian Tamil-language action comedy film directed by K. Bhagyaraj, starring himself and M. G. Ramachandran. The film, which incorporates significant footage from Ramachandran's shelved film Anna Nee En Deivam, was a hit. It was then remade in Hindi as Gopi Kishan in 1994, in Kannada as Jagath Kiladi in 1998.

== Plot ==
Ramu is a hardened criminal who returns home after completing 14 years of imprisonment for murder. Ramu was wrongfully implicated in a murder by his schoolmate while he stood against their wrongdoings. Ramu thinks his father is dead, but he soon learns that his mother has kept his existence hidden from Ramu. He learns that his father Prakash was a jeweller who killed his partner and ran away with some precious jewels. She tells Ramu that she never saw Prakash after that and now he is a dreaded gangster in the underworld. Ramu decides to avenge his father for all his wrongdoings. He singles out Kasinath, a powerful man of Prakash and decides to strike on him. Meanwhile, Veerasaamy, a doppelgänger of Ramu, works as a constable in the police force. Veerasamy has a doting mother, a wife and a kid, but isn't taken seriously as he lacks the guts to become anything worthwhile. Ramu spots Veerasamy and decides to use him for his purposes. Ramu starts bumping off the goons while Veerasamy starts getting the credit.

Soon, Veerasamy's fortune changes, while Ramu succeeds in furthering his motives. Sadly, Anitha, the Commissioner's daughter, falls in love with Veerasamy, unaware of his marital status. One day, Ramu manages to sneak into Prakash's lair. He holds Prakash on gunpoint and shows him the photo of his mother. He learns that Kasinath is the kingpin and prakash the pawn, rather than another way around. Prakash tells Ramu that Kasinath's men killed Prakash's partner for the jewels. Prakash somehow scooted off with the money and hid it in the basement of a construction site. Kasinath caught Prakash and told him that the latter has been convicted for the former's crimes. Kasinath also tells him that his wife has committed suicide and his son would be killed too, if Prakash does not tell the location of the jewels. Prakash does not tell the location, but to save the infant from death, takes the blame on himself. Upon this, Ramu reveals his true identity. Both realise that kasinath passed some other child as Prakash's child. Ramu learns that the place the money was hidden is the police headquarters now.

Ramu decides to retrieve the loot, but both Veerasamy and Anitha realise the truth. Now, veerasamy starts hunting for Ramu. Meanwhile, Ramu has infuriated Kasinath too by killing some of his goons. Ramu's mother, whom ramu had left to find his father, comes to find him. She runs into Veerasamy, mistaking him for Ramu. Veerasamy tricks her and abducts her. But Veerasamy is in for a surprise when ramu's mother and his mother turn out to be acquaintances. Veerasamy's mother reveals that when Ramu's mother was in labour, she delivered twins. Veerasamy's mother was actually childless, so she took one of the kids.

Veerasamy is in a quandary as he cannot arrest his newfound brother, but decides that he has to do this, one way or another. Meanwhile, Ramu has revealed the truth to Anitha, who agrees to help him in retrieving the score. Kasinath succeeds in nabbing Ramu. Unable to see his son tortured, prakash spills the beans. Veerasamy enters the den and pretends to be ramu, claiming that kasinath has actually kidnapped the gullible Veerasamy. One by one, all the villains are unmasked. Prakash is delighted to meet his wife, while both Veerasamy and Ramu start bringing kasinath's empire to dust. After killing Kasinath's son, which ironically provides poetic justice in this case, all the goons are rounded up. Finally, Ramu and Veerasamy and their families are united.

== Cast ==
- M. G. Ramachandran as Raju
- K. Bhagyaraj as Ramu and Veerasamy Naidu
- Gautami as Anitha
- Silk Smitha as Chinnappapa (Voice over by Hemamalini)
- Latha as Chitra
- Pandari Bai as Raju and Seetha's mother
- M. N. Nambiar as Prakash
- Vijayakumar as B. P. Kasinath
- Sangeetha as Seetha
- V. Gopalakrishnan as Commissioner A. Ganesh
- V. S. Raghavan as Chitra's father
- Usilai Mani
- Bayilvan Ranganathan as Inspector
- Kovai Senthil as a police officer
- Monica (uncredited)

== Production ==
C. V. Sridhar began a project called Anna Nee En Deivam in 1977 with M. G. Ramachandran starring. It was shelved after 4,000 feet (1,200 m) was canned, as Ramachandran retired from acting in 1978 to take up his duties as the Chief Minister of Tamil Nadu. Sankaran and Aarumugam who produced this film gave negative rolls and rights to Duraisamy who provided finance for the film due to which he faced losses in distribution business. In order to help Duraisamy, K. Bhagyaraj, who watched half of the film, asked Ramachandran's permission to make a film on himself by incorporating this film to which Ramachandran agreed.

Approximately 4,000 feet (1,200 m) of Anna Nee En Deivam was incorporated into the film. M. N. Nambiar, V. S. Raghavan and Sangeetha who were part of Anna Nee En Deivam agreed to be part of Avasara Police 100; however, Latha, lead actress of that film refused to act in Avasara Police 100 as she had quit acting after her marriage. Monica made her debut with this film.

The film was launched in AVM Studios with Ramachandran as chief guest. According to Duraisamy, the filming took four years to be completed as Bhagyaraj was busy with other commitments while also making efforts to make sure that the film did not affect the image of Ramachandran.

== Soundtrack ==
The music was composed by M. S. Viswanathan (for four songs of Ramachandran's portions) and Bhagyaraj for five songs.

Song	Singers	Music	Lyrics	Length
"Nee Nenachathum"	T. M. Soundararajan	M. S. Viswanathan	Vaali	03:23
"Parakkum painkili"	T. M. Soundararajan	M. S. Viswanathan	Vaali	03:23
"En Mappillaikku"	T. M. Soundararajan	M. S. Viswanathan	Vaali	03:23
"Unai thedi vandhal"	S. P. Balasubrahmanyam, Vani Jayaram	M. S. Viswanathan	Muthulingam	03:23
"Rajangam En Rajangam"	S. P. Balasubrahmanyam	K. Bhagyaraj	Vaali	04:14
"Naan Pongal"	Mano, S. Janaki	K. Bhagyaraj	Vaali	04:27
"Naa Bavagaru"	Mano, S. Janaki	K. Bhagyaraj	Vaali	04:40
"Nagooru Pettai"	Malaysia Vasudevan, S. Janaki	K. Bhagyaraj	Vairamuthu	04:38
"Pattu Pu Pu Pu" (Not in the movie, not held)	S. Janaki & chorus	K. Bhagyaraj	Chinnakonar	04:25

== Reception ==
C. R. K. of Kalki wrote Bhagyaraj once again demonstrates his ability to make a film for a layman, also it is a new success to keep only some parts of a half-built house intact, and at the same time to change the foundation and build a new house and make it stand upright.
