= Vennira Aadai =

1965 film by C. V. Sridhar

- Theatrical release poster
- Directed by: Sridhar
- Written by: Sridhar; Chithralaya Gopu
- Produced by: Sridhar
- Starring: Jayalalithaa; Nirmala; Shylashri; Srikanth; Moorthy
- Cinematography: G. Balakrishna
- Edited by: N. M. Shankar
- Music by: Viswanathan–Ramamoorthy
- Production company: Chithralaya
- Release date: 14 April 1965
- Running time: 178 minutes
- Country: India
- Language: Tamil

Vennira Aadai (transl. White Dress) (Note: The term is usually associated with Indian widows, given the colour of the clothes they wear upon entering widowhood.) is a 1965 Indian Tamil-language romance film, co-written, produced and directed by Sridhar. The film stars Jayalalithaa, Nirmala, Shylashri, Srikanth and Moorthy, all in their Tamil cinema debut. It was released on 14 April 1965 and became a success.

== Plot ==
Chandrasekhar "Chandru" is a famous psychiatrist and has earned much praise from his mentor and people in the town. He is in love with Geetha. One day, he is assigned the task of curing a mentally unstable woman Sowbagyavathi "Shobha" who lives in Kodaikanal. Chandru informs about this to his lover and requests her to wait for him until he finishes this case. Chandru promises he will return for her and sets out to Kodaikanal. On arriving, he is welcomed by Shobha's parents, who are very much distressed with their daughter's condition. Chandru questions them about her past, but they conceal it initially, as it might have a severe consequence on her future. Upon reiteration that knowing her past will be very useful for him to cure her, Shobha's parents reveal her awful past.

Shobha, at a very young age, got married and within hours, the couple met with an accident and her spouse died. Due to the aftermath of the accident and upon learning of her husband's death, Shobha loses her mental stability. As days pass by, Chandru cures her for good. Her parents are happy on learning that Shobha has completely forgotten her past to begin a new life. Shobha begins to fall in love with Chandru, but is reluctant to profess her love to him, instead she tells her parents. Chandru, upon learning this, fears that she might go back to her old condition if she learns that a girl is awaiting him. Chandru, having no courage, informs about this to Shobha's parents. Chandru marries Geetha and Shobha on the other hand, tells that she indeed remembers her past and wears a white saree (tradition where a widow wears a white saree) and convinces herself of her destiny.

== Cast ==
- Srikanth as Chandrasekhar "Chandru"
- Nirmala as Geetha
- Jayalalithaa as Sowbagyavathi "Shobha"
- Shylashri as Asha
- Moorthy as Moorthy
- Sundarrajan as Shobha's father
- Rukmani as Seetha

== Production ==
=== Development ===
Sridhar watched the American film David and Lisa (1962), which inspired him to make a film in Tamil with a similar theme portraying a mentally challenged woman, which became Vennira Aadai. Sridhar's usual cinematographer A. Vincent was unable to work on this film since he went on to become busy in Malayalam cinema; he was replaced by Balakrishna who earlier worked on the Hindi film Jhanak Jhanak Payal Baaje (1955).

=== Casting and filming ===
The film marked the debut of Jayalalithaa in Tamil cinema. Sridhar, who was scouting for an actress with a teenage face with a modern look born and bred in the upper class to portray a young widow, found Jayalalithaa, daughter of actress Sandhya, at a swimming pool in Saidapet. Sandhya was initially reluctant to let Jayalalithaa portray this role as she portrayed a similar character in a Kannada film; however Jayalalithaa agreed to act in the film. Sundarrajan initially refused to play a father's role in the film as he wanted to be the lead actor, but was persuaded by a friend who noted that "heroes had a short shelf life, but 'fathers' would always be in demand". Sundarrajan wore a fake moustache to portray his character.

When Moorthy met his friend Chakravarthy, an associate of filmmaker Sridhar, and told him about his desire to act, Chakravarthy, who had previously seen Moorthy act on stage, told Sridhar about him, Moorthy eventually made his acting debut with this film portraying a comic role. Srikanth who earlier worked in American Consulate and was also a theatre artist made his film debut as lead actor. Both Chakravarthy and Srikanth used to play table tennis at T. Nagar Club House, and Chakravarthy requested Srikanth to give auditions for the film. While scouting for an actress to play Srikanth's pair, Sridhar initially chose Hema Malini, but later dropped her after feeling she lacked the maturity needed for the character; he chose debutant Shanti for this role whom he rejected for Rajasree's character in Kadhalikka Neramillai (1964), she was rechristened Nirmala. The film is the Tamil debut for Shylashri who was credited as Asha. Filming began at Madurai where the song "Kannan Ennum" was shot at Vaigai River.

== Soundtrack ==
The lyrics were written by Kannadasan and the music was composed by Viswanathan–Ramamoorthy. The song "Kannan Ennum" is set in Sankarabharanam raga.

Song	Singers	Length
"Alli Pandhal"	L. R. Eswari, Raju	03:13
"Ammamma Kaatru Vandhu"	P. Susheela	03:23
"Chiththirame"	P. B. Sreenivas, S. Janaki	03:34
"Enna Enna Vaarththaigalo"	P. Susheela	03:44
"Kannan Ennum"	P. Susheela	03:25
"Nee Enbadhenna"	L. R. Eswari	05:03
"Neeraadum Kangal"	P. Susheela	03:14
"Needhi Idhuthaana"	P. B. Sreenivas	02:55
"Oruvan Kaadhalan"	P. B. Sreenivas, P. Susheela	02:55

== Release ==
Vennira Aadai was released on 14 April 1965. It received an "A" (adults only) certificate from the CBFC (second such film after Marmayogi); according to The Financial Express, this was due to one song sequence featuring Jayalalithaa bathing in a waterfall while wearing a sleeveless blouse, whereas T. A. Narasimhan of Hindu Tamil Thisai claimed it was due to a scene where a patient requests a doctor to unhook her outfit. This became the first Tamil film to be screened in Little Anand theatre. When the film got released in that theatre, it initially got lukewarm response from audience but later went on to do well.

== Reception ==
Kalki lauded the story, cast performances and picturisation of Kodaikanal scenes, thanking Sridhar for boldly making a film with newcomers. Ananda Vikatan lauded the performance of Jayalalithaa, but criticised that of Shanta and Nirmala. The critic also said there were no memorable songs apart from "Nee Enbathenna" and "Kannan Ennum Mannan Paerai". The critic appreciated the nature cinematography, but felt the climax was unconvincing.

== Legacy ==
After the film's success, Nirmala and Moorthy added Vennira Aadai to their respective stage names. In the film, Thalaivii, a biopic on Jayalalithaa, the shooting of this film is shown.
