= Kumkuma Rakshe =

- Title card
- Directed by: S. K. A. Chari
- Based on: Nenjil Or Aalayam by C. V. Sridhar
- Starring: Ashok; Rajinikanth; Manjula
- Music by: Vijaya Bhaskar
- Release date: 14 October 1977
- Running time: 160 minutes
- Country: India
- Language: Kannada

Kumkuma Rakshe is a 1977 Indian Kannada-language romantic drama film directed by S. K. A. Chari. It is a remake of the 1962 Tamil film Nenjil Or Aalayam by C. V. Sridhar. The film stars Ashok, Rajinikanth, and Manjula. It was released on 14 October 1977. The film was dubbed and released in Tamil as Kurinji Malar (1980) with reshot comedy sequences featuring Suruli Rajan and Malini.

== Cast ==
- Ashok
- Rajinikanth
- Manjula
- Leelavathi
- Ambareesh

== Soundtrack ==
The soundtrack was composed by Vijaya Bhaskar with lyrics written by Chi. Udayashankar.

Track listing
No.	Title	Singers	Length
1.	"Taanonda Nenedare Maanava"	S. P. Balasubrahmanyam	3:30
2.	"Neenu Balle Naanu Balle"	S. P. Balasubrahmanyam	2:58
3.	"Baadada Hoovaagu"	Vani Jairam	3:24
Total length:			9:52
