= Pelli Kanuka =

Pelli Kanuka (transl. Wedding Gift) may refer to these Indian films:

- Pelli Kanuka (1960 film)
- Pelli Kanuka (1998 film)
