= Nazrana (1961 film) =

1961 Hindi film directed by C. V. Sridhar

- Film poster
- Directed by: C. V. Sridhar
- Written by: C. V. Sridhar (story); Rajendra Krishan (dialogue and lyrics)
- Based on: Kalyana Parisu (Tamil)
- Produced by: S. Krishnamurthy and T. Govindarajan
- Starring: Raj Kapoor; Vyjayanthimala; Usha Kiran
- Cinematography: A. Vincent
- Edited by: N. M. Shankar
- Music by: Ravi
- Production company: Venus Pictures
- Distributed by: Venus Pictures
- Release date: 1961
- Running time: 130 minutes
- Country: India
- Language: Hindi
- Budget: ₹40,00,000 (estimated)
- Box office: ₹90,00,000

Nazrana (transl. Gift) is a 1961 Indian black-and-white Hindi-language melodrama film produced by S. Krishnamurthy and T. Govindarajan and directed by C. V. Sridhar in his Hindi directorial debut. It stars Raj Kapoor, Vyjayanthimala, Usha Kiran in a love triangle, while South star Gemini Ganeshan has an extended cameo appearance. The music is by Ravi. The Mohammed Rafi song "Baazi Kisi Ne Pyar Ki Jeeti Ya Haar Di", which was picturised on Raj Kapoor and it was one of the popular sad songs of that era.

The film was a remake of the 1959 Tamil film Kalyana Parisu, also directed by C. V. Sridhar and was remade in Turkish as Küçük Sevgilim. Nazrana is a triangular love story between Raj, Basanti and Geeta.

== Plot ==
Rajesh (Raj Kapoor), shortly called Raj and Basanti (Vyjayanthimala) are college mates who clash when she complains to the college principal about a love letter he sent her. Later on, realizing her mistake, Basanti apologizes to him and the two fall in love. Basanti's elder sister, Geeta (Usha Kiran), supports the family by stitching clothes. Raj rents the room upstairs in their house. He falls ill and in nursing him, Geeta falls in love with him. She confides her love to Basanti, who decides to sacrifice her love for the sake of her sister and convinces Raj to marry Geeta. Raj initially neglects Geeta. On finding out, Basanti writes to him that their sacrifice, made for Geeta's happiness, would mean nothing unless he is a good husband to Geeta. Raj relents and marries Geeta and they have a son. Basanti joins them and Geeta suspects that there is something on between Raj and Basanti and makes Basanti leave the house. A few years later, Geeta, having found out that Raj and Basanti loved each other, dies in guilt leaving Raj alone to bring up their child, making him promise that he will make Basanti the child's mother. Raj learns about Basanti's impending marriage to her former boss Shyam (Gemini Ganeshan). By the time he reaches there, Basanti is already married. He hands over his child to Basanti as a wedding gift and walks away.

== Cast ==
- Raj Kapoor as Rajesh "Raj"
- Vyjayanthimala as Basanti
- Usha Kiran as Geeta
- Gemini Ganeshan as Shyam
- Agha as Murli
- Sabita Chatterji as Chanchal
- Niranjan Sharma as Shyam's Father
- Achala Sachdev as Geeta and Basanti's Mother.
- Master Shahid as Raja

== Production ==
=== Casting ===
Initially the shooting of the film was started with actress B. Saroja Devi, who acted in the Tamil original Kalyana Parisu and its Telugu remake Pelli Kanuka. During filming, she had a fall out with the director C. V. Sridhar over scheduling conflict with Raj Kapoor and was replaced by actress Vyjayanthimala.

== Soundtrack ==
Nazrana

Soundtrack album by Ravi
- Released: 1961
- Genre: Feature film soundtrack
- Label: Saregama

Ravi chronology
Ghunghat (1960)	Nazrana (1961)	Gharana (1961)

The film soundtrack was composed by Ravi, with lyrics by Rajendra Krishan. The songs "Baazi Kisi Ne Pyar Ki Jeeti Ya Haar Di", "Bikhrake Zulfen Chaman Mein Na Jana" and "Ek Woh Bhi Diwali Thi" became popular.

Song	Singers
"Baazi Kisi Ne"	Mohammed Rafi
"Dekha Hai Tum Ne"	Lata Mangeshkar
"Main Ne Apni Shama"	Lata Mangeshkar
"Mele Hai Chiragon Ke"	Lata Mangeshkar
"Bikhrake Zulfen Chaman Mein Na Jana"	Lata Mangeshkar, Mukesh
"Mere Peechhe Ek Deewana, Kuch Albela Mastana"	Asha Bhosle, Mukesh
"Ek Woh Bhi Diwali Thi"	Mukesh

== Box office ==
At the end of its theatrical run, Nazrana grossed around ₹90,00,000 with net of ₹45,00,000 and was an average success at box office, thus becoming 12th highest-grossing film of 1961.

== Awards ==
=== Filmfare Awards ===
1961 – Filmfare Award for Best Story – C. V. Sridhar
