= Sammanam (1975 film) =

1975 film by J. Sasikumar

- Poster
- Directed by: J. Sasikumar
- Screenplay by: Thoppil Bhasi
- Story by: C. V. Sridhar
- Based on: Kalyana Parisu (Tamil)(1959)
- Produced by: Thiruppathi Chettiyar
- Starring: Prem Nazir; Madhu; Jayabharathi; Sujatha
- Cinematography: C. J. Mohan
- Edited by: K. Sankunni
- Music by: V. Dakshinamoorthy
- Production company: Evershine Productions
- Release date: 30 May 1975
- Country: India
- Language: Malayalam

Sammanam (transl. Gift) is a 1975 Indian Malayalam-language romantic drama film, directed by J. Sasikumar and produced by Thiruppathi Chettiyar. The film stars Prem Nazir, Madhu, Jayabharathi and Sujatha. It is a remake of the 1959 Tamil film Kalyana Parisu.

== Cast ==
- Prem Nazir as Bhaskaran
- Madhu as Raghu
- Jayabharathi as Vasanthi
- Sujatha as Geetha

== Soundtrack ==
The music was composed by V. Dakshinamoorthy, with lyrics by Vayalar Ramavarma.

Song	Singers
"Changampuzha"	K. J. Yesudas
"Ente Kayyil Poothiri"	Vani Jayaram
"Kaattuchennu Kalebaram"	Vani Jayaram
"Kanninu Karuppu"	P. Jayachandran, Jayashree
"Karayoo Karayoo Hridayame"	K. J. Yesudas
