= Anna Nee En Deivam =

Uncompleted Indian film of 1976

- Poster
- Directed by: C. V. Sridhar
- Starring: M. G. Ramachandran; Latha; Sangeeta
- Music by: M. S. Viswanathan
- Production company: Jayaar Movies
- Country: India
- Language: Tamil

Anna Nee En Deivam (transl. Elder brother, you are my god) is a shelved Indian Tamil-language film directed by C. V. Sridhar and produced by Jayaar Movies. The film was to have starred M. G. Ramachandran, Latha, Sangeeta, M. N. Nambiar and V. S. Raghavan.

== Cast ==
- M. G. Ramachandran as Raju
- Latha as Chitra
- Sangeeta as Seeta
- M. N. Nambiar as Prakash
- V. S. Raghavan as Chitra's father
- Pandari Bai as Raju and Seeta's mother

== Production ==
The project was announced in 1976, when C. V. Sridhar discussed his decision to direct a film with M. G. Ramachandran after the success of their previous collaboration Urimaikural (1974). While making Anna Nee En Deivam, Sridhar was simultaneously making Meenava Nanban with Ramachandran. The film was launched at Sathya Studios and a scene with Ramachandran and Sangeetha was shot on the same day. The film was produced by Sankaran and Aarumugam from Tenkasi with financier Duraisamy providing finance. However, due to the latter's political commitments and his involvement in other projects, the film was delayed. It was ultimately shelved after 4,000 ft of the portions being canned, as Ramachandran retired from filmmaking as well as acting in 1978 to take up his duties as the Chief Minister of Tamil Nadu; however he completed acting in Meenava Nanban.

== Soundtrack ==
The music was composed by M. S. Viswanathan

Song	Singers	Music	Lyrics	Length
"Nee Nenachathum"	T. M. Soundararajan	M. S. Viswanathan	Vaali	03:23
"Parakkum painkili"	T. M. Soundararajan	M. S. Viswanathan	Vaali	03:23
"En Mappillaikku"	T. M. Soundararajan	M. S. Viswanathan	Vaali	03:23
"Unai thedi vandhal"	S. P. Balasubrahmanyam & vanijayaram	M. S. Viswanathan	Muthulingam	03:23

== Future ==
K. Bhagyaraj incorporated approximately 4000 feet of the film as a new plot for Avasara Police 100 which released in 1990. M. N. Nambiar, Sangeetha and V. S. Raghavan played the same characters from Anna Nee En Deivam in Avasara Police 100 as well.
