= Meenava Nanban =

1977 film by C. V. Sridhar

- Theatrical release poster
- Directed by: Sridhar
- Written by: Sridhar
- Produced by: K. R. Sadayappa Chettiar
- Starring: M. G. Ramachandran; Latha; Vennira Aadai Nirmala
- Cinematography: N. Balakrishnan
- Edited by: M. Umanath
- Music by: M. S. Viswanathan
- Production company: Muthu Enterprise
- Release date: 14 August 1977
- Country: India
- Language: Tamil

Meenava Nanban (transl. Friend of fishermen) is a 1977 Indian Tamil-language action drama film written and directed by Sridhar. The film stars M. G. Ramachandran and Latha, with Vennira Aadai Nirmala, M. N. Nambiar, Nagesh among others enacting supporting roles. It was released on 14 August 1977.

== Plot ==
Kumaran, an adventurer comes to a fishing enclave who help him. He meets the arrogant daughter of Nagaraj, Kamali, who treats them with disrespect and reforms her as they fall in love with each other in the process. He then takes it upon himself to defend the fishermen exploited by Nagaraj. Together with Kamali, they reform Nagaraj while saving him from the bad guys, Arun and Selvaraj, he associates with who turn on him.

== Cast ==
- M. G. Ramachandran as Kumaran
- Latha as Kamali
- Vennira Aadai Nirmala as Shanti
- Sachu as Muthamma
- V. K. Ramasamy as Nagaraj
- M. N. Nambiar as Arun
- P. S. Veerappa as Selvaraj
- Nagesh as Ratnam
- Thengai Srinivasan as Manickam
- K. Kannan as Mahi
- K. K. Soundar as In charge of Coolie
- Karikol Raju as Fisherman
- T. K. S. Natarajan as Varadhan
- Loose Mohan as Fisherman
- Rangammal

== Production ==
After the success of Urimaikural (1974), Sridhar decided to make another film with M. G. Ramachandran titled Naanum Oru Thozhilali (transl. I too am a worker); however it got dropped after Sridhar felt it lacked a strong plot. Sadayappa Chettiar approached Sridhar expressing interest to produce a film with Ramachandran as lead actor and Sridhar directing. Sridhar named the film as Latchiya Kanavu (transl. Ambitious dream) while simultaneously making another film with Ramachandran titled Anna Nee En Deivam. Sridhar later changed the title from Latchiya Kanavu to Meenava Nanban as per Ramachandran's suggestion. Meenava Nanban was the second and final collaboration of Ramachandran with Sridhar, after Urimaikural. Santhana Bharathi, who worked as assistant director, recalled that another famous director P. Vasu joined as assistant in the film's unit. Angamuthu took care of art direction while Shyam Sunder handled the stunt choreography.

Ramachandran performed his own stunt in a scene by jumping from a 12 metres (39 ft) building, but sustained no injuries. A few scenes of Meenava Nanban were shot at Manipal. The filming was stopped for a few months because Sridhar met with an accident, damaging his left eye. After the operation, Sridhar restarted both films – Meenava Nanban and Anna Nee En Deivam – at the same time. During that time, Ramachandran won the 1977 elections and became the chief minister of Tamil Nadu, due to which Anna Nee En Deivam was shelved after canning few scenes but Sridhar completed Meenava Nanban with climax was shot in a set of a boat resembling flood in studio. Ramachandran wore a wig to portray his character, and ensured it remained consistent throughout the course of production to preserve continuity.

== Soundtrack ==
The soundtrack was composed by M. S. Viswanathan. Muthulingam recalled that Ramachandran discovered that he did not write any song despite production being near completion, so he insisted him to write the song "Thangathil Mugam Eduthu". The song "Pongum Kadalosai" is based on Valaji raga.

Track listing
No.	Title	Lyrics	Singer(s)	Length
1.	"Nerukku Neraai"	Pulamaipithan	T. M. Soundararajan	4:01
2.	"Pongum Kadalosai"	Vaali	Vani Jairam	4:36
3.	"Thangathil Mugameduthu"	Muthulingam	K. J. Yesudas, Vani Jairam	3:15
4.	"Pattathu Rajavum"	Vaali	T. M. Soundararajan	4:32
5.	"Neram Pournami"	Vaali	S. P. Balasubrahmanyam, Vani Jairam	4:26
6.	"Kannazhagu Singarikku"	Pulamaipithan	T. M. Soundararajan, Vani Jairam	3:07
Total length:				23:57

== Critical reception ==
Anna reviewed the film in two halves; the first was published on 21 August 1977, and the second the following day.
