= Lakshmi Nivasa =

- Directed by: K. S. R. Das
- Written by: Chi. Udaya Shankar
- Screenplay by: M. D. Sundar
- Story by: Jayalakshmi Art Enterprises Katha Vibhaga
- Produced by: B. H. Jayanna; B. J. L. Prakash; Smt B. J. Kasthuri
- Starring: Ramgopal; Balakrishna; Thoogudeepa Srinivas; Narasimharaju; Padmapriya
- Cinematography: S. S. Lal
- Edited by: P. U. S. Maniyam
- Music by: T. G. Lingappa
- Production company: Jayalakshmi Art Enterprises
- Distributed by: Jayalakshmi Art Enterprises
- Release date: 9 March 1977
- Running time: 125 min
- Country: India
- Language: Kannada

Lakshmi Nivasa is a 1977 Indian Kannada-language film, directed by K. S. R. Das and produced by B. H. Jayanna, B. J. L. Prakash and Smt B. J. Kasthuri. The film stars Ramgopal, Balakrishna, Thoogudeepa Srinivas and Narasimharaju and Padmapriya in the lead roles. The film has musical score by T. G. Lingappa.

== Cast ==
- Ramgopal
- Padmapriya
- Balakrishna
- Thoogudeepa Srinivas
- Narasimharaju
- Prabhakar
- Chethan
- Basavaraju
- Manohar
- Narayan
- Ramachandra
- Gopal
- Maanu in Guest Appearance
- Y. Vijaya
- Adavani Lakshmidevi
- C. K. Kalavathi
- Halam
