= Mohana Punnagai =

- Theatrical release poster
- Directed by: Sridhar
- Written by: Sridhar
- Produced by: R. P. Sarathy
- Starring: Sivaji Ganesan; Geetha Kumarasinghe; Jayabharathi; Padmapriya; Anuradha; Anandhi
- Cinematography: P. N. Sundaram
- Edited by: K. Govindasamy
- Music by: M. S. Viswanathan
- Production company: Sarathy Motion Pictures
- Release date: 14 January 1981
- Country: India
- Language: Tamil

Mohana Punnagai (transl. The seductive smile) is a 1981 Indian Tamil-language romance film written and directed by Sridhar. The film stars Sivaji Ganesan, Geetha Kumarasinghe, Jayabharathi, Padmapriya, Anuradha and Anandhi. It was released on 14 January 1981. The film was an average grosser in Tamil Nadu, but performed better in Sri Lanka.

== Plot ==
Raju is a wealthy man who has everything, except he is unlucky when it comes to matters of love. There are four women who comes into his life only for him to lose them. He meets and falls in love with Geetha while on excursion of a business trip to Sri Lanka. He poses as a photographer for magazine, wins her love and gets things to a point of marriage. Unfortunately for him, his cross-cousin, who he is very close to, would have married but for falling in love with Geetha and who has been in love with him from his childhood, Bhama, in her possessiveness, kills Geetha on the wedding altar and killing herself too.

He is heartbroken and taken to drink. His secretary, Radha, slowly but steadily brings him out of his depression and makes him look at the bright side of life again. Just when he starts to think that she is in love with him, she introduces her boyfriend and seeks his blessings, as a well-wisher, for their marriage. He does it and moves on vowing never to look at women again.

Sarasu, a teen girl and granddaughter of his servant, having watch him go to failure from failure develops an infatuation on him. To add to this, he helps her education, guides her and at one point, upon the death of her grandfather, even goes to becoming her guardian. She intends to marry him and give him the happiness that has eluded him always. Noticing the jarring age difference now that she is twenty and he is fifty, he forcefully arranges for her marriage taking the place of her father only for her to commit suicide soon after the marriage, leaving him all alone. The film ends with Raju committing suicide himself along with Sarasu by jumping off the sea.

== Cast ==
- Sivaji Ganesan as Rajasekar / Raju / Raghavan
- Geetha Kumarasinghe as Gowri
- Jayabharathi as Radha
- Padmapriya as Bhama
- Anuradha as Sarasu
- Anandhi as Mary
- Major Sundarrajan as Moorthy
- Nagesh as Narasimmachari
- S. A. Kannan as Sarasu's father
- Gemini Maali as Gowri's father
- Chinni Prakash as Sarasu's husband

== Production ==
The film was produced by photographer Sarathi. The film was launched at Golden Sea and the scenes were shot at a bungalow in Indira Nagar and Taj Coromandel at Chennai.

== Soundtrack ==
Music was by M. S. Viswanathan and lyrics were by Vaali.

Song	Singers
"Thennilangai Mangai"	S. Janaki
"Kalyanamam Kacheriyam"	T. M. Soundararajan
"Thalaivi Thalaivi"	S. P. Balasubrahmanyam, Vani Jairam
"Kudikkavidu"	T. M. Soundararajan

== Critical reception ==
Nalini Sastry of Kalki said she was doubtful this film was made by Sridhar and felt Ganesan's acting talent has been wasted again in this film. She however praised Viswanathan's music and Nagesh's comedy.
