= Oorige Upakari =

- Directed by: Joe Simon
- Written by: Kunigal Nagabhushan (dialogues)
- Screenplay by: Joe Simon
- Story by: Ajantha Combines
- Produced by: A. Radhakrishna Raju; V. L. Srinivasa Murthy
- Starring: Vishnuvardhan; Padmapriya; Vajramuni; Dheerendra Gopal
- Cinematography: H. G. Raju
- Edited by: P. Venkateshwara Rao
- Music by: Satyam
- Production company: Premalaya Films
- Distributed by: Premalaya Films
- Release date: 24 August 1982
- Running time: 149 min
- Country: India
- Language: Kannada

Oorige Upakari is a 1982 Indian Kannada-language film, directed by Joe Simon and produced by A. Radhakrishna Raju and V. L. Srinivasa Murthy. The film stars Vishnuvardhan, Padmapriya, Vajramuni and Dheerendra Gopal.

== Cast ==
- Vishnuvardhan as Jayakanth and Srikanth
- Padmapriya as Latha
- K. Vijaya as Susheela
- Vajramuni
- Dheerendra Gopal
- Musuri Krishnamurthy
- Chethan Ramarao
- Sadashiva Brahmavar
- Rajanand Susheela father
- Prabhakar as Bairaa
- Rajasulochana
- Uma Shivakumar as Latha's mother
- Ashakiran
- Mangala Bhushan
- Rathnamma
- Shanthamma
- Master Naveen
- Dwarakish in Guest Appearance
- Jyothi Lakshmi in Guest Appearance

== Soundtrack ==
The music was composed by Satyam.

No.	Song	Singers	Lyrics	Length (m:ss)
1	"Snehadali Sandiside"	S. Janaki, S. P. Balasubrahmanyam	R. N. Jayagopal	
2	"Hasiru Hasiru Bhoomiyalella"	S. Janaki, S. P. Balasubrahmanyam	R. N. Jayagopal	
3	"Delliya Kullane Baa"	S. Janaki	Chi. Udaya Shankar	
4	"Chandamundaranu"	S. P. Balasubrahmanyam	Chi. Udaya Shankar	
