= Vaira Nenjam =

- Poster
- Directed by: C. V. Sridhar
- Written by: C. V. Sridhar
- Produced by: C. V. Sridhar
- Starring: Sivaji Ganesan; Padmapriya
- Cinematography: P. Rajagopal
- Edited by: N. M. Shankar
- Music by: M. S. Viswanathan
- Production company: Chitralaya
- Release date: 2 November 1975
- Country: India
- Language: Tamil

Vaira Nenjam (transl. Diamond heart) is a 1975 Indian Tamil-language action thriller film written, directed and produced by C. V. Sridhar. The film stars Sivaji Ganesan, Padmapriya, R. Muthuraman and K. Balaji. It is a remake of Sridhar's own 1973 Hindi film Gehri Chaal. The film was released on 2 November 1975.

== Cast ==
- Sivaji Ganesan as Ananth
- Padmapriya as Geetha
- R. Muthuraman as Shankar
- K. Balaji as Madhan
- Dhulipala as Dharmalingam
- C. I. D. Sakunthala as Shoba
- Sachu as Shanthi
- Aalam as a dancer

== Production ==
After the failure of his previous directorial Alaigal (1973), feeling that audiences were being more receptive to action films than classic films, Sridhar decided to make an action film with Ganesan in the lead role. The film was titled Hero 72, with Sridhar opting to make it a Tamil-Hindi bilingual, with Jeetendra starring in the Hindi version that was later titled Gehri Chaal. Production on the Tamil version that was later titled Vaira Nenjam progressed slowly because of call sheet issues of Ganesan; Gehri Chaal was completed and released much earlier. In between the delays, Sridhar made Urimaikural (1974) starring M. G. Ramachandran.

== Soundtrack ==
All songs were composed by M. S. Viswanathan and penned by Kannadasan. The song "Sentamizh Paadum" attained popularity.

Track listing
No.	Title	Singer(s)	Length
1.	"Oh My Sweety"	T. M. Soundararajan	4:43
2.	"Sentamizh Paadum"	T. M. Soundararajan, P. Susheela	3:30
3.	"Neerada Neram"	Vani Jairam	4:23
4.	"Adi Karthigai Masamadi"	T. M. Soundararajan, L. R. Eswari	4:47
5.	"Ammaan Magan"	L. R. Eswari	4:40
Total length:			22:03

== Release and reception ==
Vaira Nenjam was released on 2 November 1975. Kanthan of Kalki said the film, despite its title, was not lustrous like a real diamond. Arthur Paris from Film World wrote, "The film has no soul, no life and is at once dull, pedestrian and moronic". The film was successful only with B and C centre audiences.
