= Manase Mandiram =

- Theatrical release poster
- Directed by: C. V. Sridhar
- Written by: C. V. Sridhar
- Based on: Nenjil Or Aalayam (1962)
- Produced by: Yarra Appa Rao
- Starring: Akkineni Nageswara Rao; Savitri
- Cinematography: Balu
- Edited by: N. M. Shankar
- Music by: M. S. Viswanathan
- Production company: Sri Krishna Sai Films
- Distributed by: Sri Films
- Release date: 6 October 1966
- Running time: 158 mins
- Country: India
- Language: Telugu

Manase Mandiram (transl. The heart is a temple) is a 1966 Indian Telugu-language romantic drama film, produced by Yarra Appa Rao and directed by C. V. Sridhar. It stars Akkineni Nageswara Rao and Savitri, with music composed by M. S. Viswanathan. The film was a remake of Sridhar's own Tamil film Nenjil Or Aalayam (1962).

== Cast ==
- Akkineni Nageswara Rao as Dr. Raghu
- Savitri as Seeta
- Jaggayya as Ramu
- Gummadi as Father
- Relangi as Devaiah
- Nagabhushanam as Kantham's husband
- Chalam as Jogulu
- Santha Kumari as Raghu's mother
- Girija as Kasulu
- Sharada as Kantham
- Jhansi as Nurse
- Nirmalamma as Uma's mother
- Baby Shantikala as Uma

== Soundtrack ==
Music composed by M. S. Viswanathan.

Song title	Lyrics	Singers	length
"Annadhi Neevena"	Acharya Aatreya	P. Susheela	4:57
"Challaga Undali"	Acharya Aatreya	Ghantasala	3:37
"Allaru Muddu Kade"	Acharya Aatreya	P. Susheela	3:38
"Rupuleni"	Karthik	Ghantasala, L. R. Eswari	3:15
"Thalachinade Jariginadaa"	Acharya Aatreya	P. B. Sreenivas	3:26
