= Priyamulla Sophia =

- Directed by: A. Vincent
- Written by: Muttathu Varkey; Thoppil Bhasi (dialogues)
- Starring: Prem Nazir; Priyamalini; Vincent; Janardanan
- Cinematography: Venkit, Suryaprakash
- Edited by: G.Venkitaraman
- Music by: G. Devarajan
- Production company: Thrupthi Films
- Distributed by: Thrupthi Films
- Release date: 19 September 1975
- Country: India
- Language: Malayalam

Priyamulla Sophia is a 1975 Indian Malayalam-language film, directed by A. Vincent. The film stars Prem Nazir, Priyamalini, Vincent) and Janardanan. The film's score was composed by G. Devarajan.

== Cast ==
- Prem Nazir
- Priyamalini
- Vincent
- Janardanan
- KPAC Sunny
- KPAC Lalitha
- Prema
- Meena
- Reena
- Adam Ayub (Actor)
- Mallika Sukumaran
- Oduvil Unnikrishnan
- Nellikode Bhaskaran
- Adoor Pankajam
- P. K. Abraham
- Philomina
- T. R. Omana
- T.S.Muthaiah
- Paravoor Bharathan
- Jagathy Sreekumar
- James

== Soundtrack ==
The music was composed by G. Devarajan with lyrics by Vayalar.

No.	Song	Singers	Lyrics	Length (m:ss)
1	"Aadamo Havvayo"	K. J. Yesudas	Vayalar	
2	"Ayyedi Maname"	C. O. Anto	Vayalar	
3	"Onnurangoo"	P. Madhuri	Vayalar	
4	"Oshaana Oshaana"	Chorus, Manoharan, Srikanth	Vayalar	
5	"Vedanakal Thalodi"	P. Madhuri	Vayalar	
