= Sivandha Mann =

1969 Tamil film by C. V. Sridhar

- Theatrical release poster
- Directed by: C. V. Sridhar
- Written by: C. V. Sridhar
- Produced by: C. V. Sridhar
- Starring: Sivaji Ganesan; Kanchana
- Cinematography: N. Balakrishnan
- Edited by: M. N. Shankar
- Music by: M. S. Viswanathan
- Production company: Chitralaya
- Release date: 9 November 1969
- Running time: 179 minutes
- Country: India
- Language: Tamil

Sivandha Mann (transl. Red Soil) is a 1969 Indian Tamil-language romantic action film written, produced and directed by C. V. Sridhar. The film stars Sivaji Ganesan and Kanchana, with S. V. Ranga Rao, M. N. Nambiar, Muthuraman, Nagesh and Sachu in supporting roles. It revolves around an Inspector General's son (Ganesan) and a princess (Kanchana) who rebel against the tyrannical ruler (Nambiar) of their region.

Sridhar initially began work on a film titled Andru Sinthiya Ratham (transl. The blood that was spilt then) with M. G. Ramachandran starring. Though many scenes were shot, the film was ultimately shelved when Ramachandran backed out. Sridhar later revived the project as Sivandha Mann with script changes, and Ganesan starring. It was the first Tamil film to be shot extensively in locations outside India; shooting locations included Switzerland, France and the Alps.

Sivandha Mann was released on 9 November 1969, Diwali day, and became a major commercial success, running for over 100 days in theatres. The film's success inspired many later Tamil and Telugu films to shoot in France. It was later remade by Sridhar in Hindi as Dharti (1970).

== Plot ==
The Portuguese want to set up an army base in Vasanthapuri, a territory in Tamil Nadu, India. They approach Diwan, a corrupt ruler of the area and decide to make him the king if he agrees to carry out the plan. He subsequently agrees, but none of the local people are happy and protest against this. Hence he starts killing them in large numbers. Ananth, who lost his father in the shootout, swears that he will have revenge for the outrage when his friend Bharat, son of the Inspector General Chandrasekar, returns from abroad.

Meanwhile, Chithralekha, the princess of Vasanthapuri, is living in Zurich, Switzerland, and is completely unaware that her native place is in danger. She sees Bharat's photo in a local daily, and learns that he is also from Vasanthapuri. She reads that he came first in the University of Bern, and develops an interest in meeting him. That night, Chithralekha meets him at a club and congratulates him for his performance, while introducing herself as "Vasanthi" to hide her true identity. Quickly, they both fall for each other. Bharat and Chithralekha enjoy as they start touring all over Europe, but when Chithralekha hears about the danger in her homeland, she has to return. Bharat also agrees to come, as he too is determined to save Vasanthapuri.

During the flight to India, one of the flight attendants announces that Diwan wants to marry the princess and will receive her at the airport. Chitralekha is not happy and commands that the flight take a different turn, but the attendant stops her from trying to escape. Bharat fights the attendant, causing the flight to continuously spin, and in the process, the flight plunges into the sea. Bharat and Chitralekha are presumed dead. But the couple washes ashore unconscious on an island, where they are treated by two local doctors who befriend them and arrange a raft for their return." Bharat realises that "Vasanthi" is actually princess Chitralekha, but she advises him just to see her as his lover and not as the princess.

Bharat and Chitralekha arrive at Ananth's house, and he is surprised to see Bharat alive. However, Chitralekha takes the guise of a normal girl because she does not want anyone to know that the princess is still alive, and to aide Bharat. Her true identity remains a secret to everyone except Bharat. The next day, people again protest at Diwan, who starts killing them all; Ananth dies in the shootout. Ananth's mother also dies in the shock of her son's death, making Bharat and his friends more determined to save Vasanthapuri. They kill a few of Diwan's men, and seek shelter in a bar whose owner Dickie also becomes their ally. Bharat, Chithralekha and the rest of their gang secretly deal with Diwan and his army.

Later at Diwan's castle, "Vasanthi" finally reveals herself as princess Chithralekha, and shocks everyone. Diwan immediately kidnaps her and boards a hot air balloon. But Bharat manages to reach him and, after an intense fight, kills Diwan. Peace returns to Vasanthapuri, while Bharat and Chithralekha are married.

== Cast ==
Male cast

- Sivaji Ganesan as Bharat / Mashinsha (Saudi Arabia Sheikh Get-up)
- Muthuraman as Ananth
- M. N. Nambiar as Diwan
- S. V. Ranga Rao as Inspector General Chandrasekar
- Javar Seetharaman as the king of Vasanthapuri
- Nagesh as Dickie
- Thengai Srinivasan as the flight attendant

Female cast

- Kanchana as Princess Chithralekha / Vasanthi
- Santha Kumari as Janaki
- Sachu as Mohin
- T. V. Kumuthini as Ananth's mother
- Magic Radhika as a dancer

Supporting roles

- Dada Mirasi as Somu (alias) Somanathan
- Vijayan as Chandar
- Mali as Sankar
- Moorthy as a soldier
- Senthamarai as guest appearance
- Sadan as a soldier
- Karikol Raju as Ananth's father
- Gemini Balu as a military officer

== Production ==
Sridhar began work on a film titled Andru Sinthiya Ratham, with M. G. Ramachandran starring. Though many scenes were shot, the film was ultimately shelved when Ramachandran backed out. According to Sridhar, the reason for Ramachandran backing out may have been that, since Sridhar launched both Kadhalikka Neramillai (1964) and Andru Sindhiya Ratham at the same time, he promoted Kadhalikka Neramillai as the first contemporary colour film but did not do the same for Andru Sindhiya Ratham, which may have made Ramachandran upset, causing him to leave. Sridhar later revived the project under the title Sivandha Mann with changes in the script, and Sivaji Ganesan as the new lead actor. It was the first action film directed by Sridhar, who previously made mainly romance and drama films. Sivandha Mann was also the first Tamil film to be shot extensively in foreign locations. Filming took place largely in Europe in places like Switzerland, France, Spain, Switzerland, and the Alps. The film was planned as a bilingual in Tamil and Hindi with Hema Malini being chosen as actress for the Tamil version, but she backed out due to her contract with Hindi cinema. The role went to Kanchana.

A river along with restaurant and bar had been created at Vauhini Studios for Sivandha Mann which was created by Ganga Das. Before filming began it gave way, leading to the entire place being flooded. An unfazed Sridhar decided to have the riverbed rebuilt with concrete. The song "Paarvai Yuvarani" was filmed at Eiffel Tower. For the film's climax, Sridhar wanted two helicopters as one helicopter will be used for handling camera to shoot the scene however he opted only one helicopter since the other helicopter which was supposed to arrive on the sets exploded after it got stuck by the electric wires. Filming was halted for few days due to the demise of Sridhar's mother, but later resumed at Madras. Sridhar shot a train explosion scene at railway track at Cudappah, Andhra Pradesh as he wanted a railway track adjacent to two hills. The film was processed at Gemini Color Laboratory, and colourised via Eastmancolor. Cinematography was handled by N. Balakrishnan, and editing by M. N. Shankar. The final length of the film was 5,254.31 metres (17,238.5 ft).

== Soundtrack ==
The soundtrack was composed by M. S. Viswanathan, with lyrics by Kannadasan. The song "Oru Raja Raniyidam" attained popularity, as did the Arabic-themed "Pattathu Rani". Viswanathan called the tune "a mix of Persian form of music to support the sequence in the film". Sridhar wanted P. Susheela to sing the song, but Viswanathan favoured L. R. Eswari. The song "Oru Naalile" was originally sung by Balamurali, but later replaced with T. M. Soundararajan's vocals.

Track listing
No.	Title	Singer(s)	Length
1.	"Anandhamaaga"	P. Susheela	3:27
2.	"Muthamidum Nearmeppo"	Saibaba, L. R. Eswari	3:34
3.	"Oru Raja Raniyidam"	T. M. Soundararajan, P. Susheela	6:47
4.	"Parvai Yuvarani"	T. M. Soundararajan	3:48
5.	"Pattathu Rani"	L. R. Eswari	6:51
6.	"Sollavo Sugamana"	P. Susheela	3:21
Total length:			27:48

== Release and reception ==
Sivandha Mann was released on 9 November 1969, Diwali day. The Indian Express wrote on 15 November, "If you expect a story, expect any of the usual elements you are sure to be disappointed. The merit of the movie is that it makes no claim for projecting great ideals nor does it claim a story". The reviewer went on to say, "Sivaji Ganesan as a rebel hero does a good job. Muthuraman as his mentor is very arresting. M. S. Viswanathan's music will be long remembered". The film was a commercial success, running for over 100 days in theatres. After its success, many Tamil and Telugu films were also inspired to shoot in France. Sridhar remade the film in Hindi as Dharti (1970), with Ganesan playing the role originally played by Muthuraman.
