= Pathivritha =

Pathivrutha
- Directed by: M. S. Chakravarty
- Written by: M. S. Chakravarthi; Pappanamkodu Lakshmanan (dialogues)
- Screenplay by: M. S. Chakravarthi
- Starring: Madhu; Sheela; MG Soman; Padmapriya
- Cinematography: Ashok Gunjal
- Edited by: V. P. Krishnan
- Music by: M. S. Viswanathan; Lyrics: Bichu Thirumala
- Production company: Meghalaya Films
- Distributed by: Meghalaya Films
- Release date: 28 September 1979
- Country: India
- Language: Malayalam

Pathivritha is a 1979 Indian Malayalam-language film, directed by M. S. Chakravarty. The film stars Madhu, Sheela, M. G. Soman and Padmapriya.

== Cast ==
- Madhu
- Sheela
- M. G. Soman
- Padmapriya
- Ravi Menon
- Reena
- Seema

== Soundtrack ==
The music was composed by M. S. Viswanathan with lyrics by Bichu Thirumala.

No.	Song	Singers	Lyrics	Length (m:ss)
1	"Aa Janmasoubhaagyame"	K. J. Yesudas	Bichu Thirumala	
2	"Iniyoru Naalil"	P. Susheela, P. Jayachandran	Bichu Thirumala	
3	"Kalam Kalam Malarmelam"	S. Janaki	Bichu Thirumala	
4	"Shankhumukham Kadappurathoru"	Vani Jairam, Jolly Abraham	Bichu Thirumala	
