= Padmapriya =

Indian actress

- Born: Padmalochani; Karnataka, India
- Died: 16 November 1997; T. Nagar, Chennai, Tamil Nadu, India
- Occupation: Actress
- Years active: 1974–1995
- Spouse: Srinivasa Chakravarthy (m. 1983)
- Children: Vasumathi (daughter)

Padmapriya (born Padmalochani; died 16 November 1997) was an Indian actress who worked in Kannada, Tamil, Malayalam and Telugu films. Her first movie was in Telugu, Adapillala Tandri (1974). In Kannada, she debuted with Bangarada Gudi (1976) and was a popular actress during the late 1970s. She has the distinction of having acted opposite the legendary Dr. Rajkumar in three successive hit movies in a single year (1978) - Operation Diamond Racket, Thayige Thakka Maga and Shankar Guru. She starred opposite Anant Nag in the comedy Narada Vijaya and the novel-based Baadada Hoo and both were highly successful. She acted in four to five movies with Dr. Vishnuvardhan, and played glamorous roles. Srinath, Ashok and Lokesh were her other costars in Kannada movies.

She had a successful career in Tamil films as a lead heroine between 1974 and 1981 movies Vazhthungal, Vaira Nenjam, Mohana Punnagai, Vaazhnthu Kaattugiren, Kuppathu Raja, Aayiram Jenmangal, and Madhuraiyai Meetta Sundharapandiyan are some of her notable Tamil films. She acted opposite Sivaji Ganesan in Vaira Nenjam and Mohana Punnagai. She was paired with M. G. Ramachandran in Madhuraiyai Meetta Sundharapandiyan portraying the role of a princess and Nallathai Naadu Kekum. She acted in nearly 80 movies, mainly in South Indian languages.

She acted in Telugu movies too, notably acted in 2 movies 'Cheekati Velugulu' and 'Maa Inti Devatha' with Super Star Krishna

== Personal life ==
Padmapriya was regarded as the Hema Malini of the South. Padmapriya was born in Karnataka. In 1983, she married Srinivasan and the couple has a daughter named Vasumathi. Just a year after marriage, the couple filed for divorce, which dragged on for a long time. After filing for divorce, Padmapriya stayed with her parents for 13 years at T. Nagar.

== Death ==
Padmapriya died on 16 November 1997 from heart disease as well as kidney failure. After her death, Vasumathi tried to enter the film industry but failed and is now settled in the United Kingdom.

== Partial filmography ==
Padmapriya was fluent in all four South Indian languages and dubbed in her own voice. Her last movie in Tamil was Thotta Chinungi, where she played a mother's role. Table is in order of languages in which she acted, from the most to the fewest films after her marriage.

Year	Film	Role	Language	Note
1974	Adapillala Tandri		Telugu	
1975	Cheekati Velugulu	Padma	Telugu	
1975	Eduruleni Manishi	Sarala	Telugu	
1975	Karotti Kannan	Kamala	Tamil	
1975	Thiyaga Ullam	Geetha	Tamil	
1975	Vaira Nenjam	Geetha	Tamil	
1975	Uravu Solla Oruvan	Indra	Tamil	
1975	Anaya Vilakku	Anandhi	Tamil	
1975	Vaazhnthu Kaattugiren	Pankajam	Tamil	
1975	Engalakkum Kaadhal Varum		Tamil	
1976	Manchiki Maro Peru	Neelima	Telugu	
1976	Unmaiye Un Vilai Enna?	Rama	Tamil	
1976	Bangarada Gudi	Aruna	Kannada	
1977	Sorgam Naragam	Radha	Tamil	
1977	Perumaikkuriyaval	Shanthi	Tamil	
1977	Deviyin Thirumanam		Tamil	
1977	Andru Sinthiya Ratham	Rohini	Tamil	
1977	Lakshmi Nivasa		Kannada	
1977	Chathurvedam		Malayalam	
1977	Akale Aakaasham		Malayalam	
1977	Abhinivesham	Sathi	Malayalam	
1977	Ashtamangalyam		Malayalam	
1977	Sujatha	Malini	Malayalam	
1977	Bhale Alludu	Sudha	Telugu	
1978	Vazhthungal		Tamil	
1978	Madhuraiyai Meetta Sundharapandiyan	Princess Bhamini	Tamil	
1978	Kungumam Kathai Solgirathu		Tamil	
1978	Aayiram Jenmangal	Radha	Tamil	
1978	Varuvan Vadivelan		Tamil	
1978	Agni Pravesam		Tamil	
1978	Pottelu Punnamma	Radha	Telugu	
1978	Thayige Thakka Maga	Mala	Kannada	
1978	Shankar Guru	Malathi	Kannada	
1978	Operation Diamond Racket	Meena	Kannada	
1978	Madhura Sangama	Stage actor in a play	Kannada	Cameo
1978	Aval Kanda Lokam		Malayalam	
1978	Prathyaksha Daivam		Malayalam	
1979	Siri Siri Mama		Tamil	
1979	Kaathalikka 90 Naal		Tamil	
1979	Kuppathu Raja	Kasthuri	Tamil	
1979	Maralu Sarapani		Kannada	
1979	Preethi Madu Thamashe Nodu	Padmini	Kannada	
1979	Asadhya Aliya	Aruna	Kannada	
1979	Rahasya Rathri		Kannada	
1979	Pathivritha		Malayalam	
1979	Mani Koya Kurup		Malayalam	
1980	Neerottam	Kanmani	Tamil	
1980	Pattanakke Banda Pathniyaru		Kannada	
1980	Narada Vijaya	Radha	Kannada	
1980	Nanna Rosha Nooru Varusha	Shanthi	Kannada	
1980	Manku Thimma		Kannada	
1980	Maa Inti Devatha	Shobha	Telugu	
1981	Mohana Punnagai	Bhama	Tamil	
1981	Aparadhi Naanalla	Saroja	Kannada	Unreleased
1982	Oorige Upakari		Kannada	
1982	Baadada Hoo	Hema	Kannada	
1983	Kalluveene Nudiyithu		Kannada	
1983	Jasoos 999		Hindi	
1984	Idhayam Thedum Udhayam		Tamil	
1990	Pudhu Varisu	Parvathi	Tamil	
1991	Nallathai Naadu Kekum	Mala	Tamil	Archived footage
1994	Kaadhalan	Prabhu's mother	Tamil	
1995	Gandhi Pirantha Mann	Padma	Tamil	
1995	Thotta Chinungi	Lakshmi	Tamil	Last Film in Tamil
