= Kochu Themmadi =

- Directed by: A. Vincent
- Written by: M. T. Vasudevan Nair
- Screenplay by: M. T. Vasudevan Nair
- Produced by: Sobhana Parameswaran Nair
- Starring: Mammootty; Adoor Bhasi; Sunanda; Sreenivasan
- Cinematography: P. Bhaskara Rao
- Edited by: V. P. Krishnan
- Music by: G. Devarajan
- Production company: Roopavani Films
- Distributed by: Roopavani Films
- Release date: 28 November 1986
- Country: India
- Language: Malayalam

Kochu Themmadi is a 1986 Indian Malayalam film, directed by A. Vincent and produced by Sobhana Parameswaran Nair. The film stars Mammootty, Adoor Bhasi, Sunanda and Sreenivasan in the lead roles. The film has musical score by G. Devarajan.

== Plot summary ==
Unni lives as a servant's son in his maternal home. His father is a drunkard and doesn't take care of him. He is good in studies but gets involved with bad friends and their influences. A new teacher joins the school, Shekharan. Shekharan is feared by students, he is a disabled ex-serviceman. Shekharan takes special interest in Unni because he used to love his mother in his youth. He tries to lead the students to a better path but not all of them go his way. Will he be able to persuade them or whether fate has a different plan for him forms the climax of the story.

== Cast ==
- Mammootty as Shekharan
- Adoor Bhasi as Headmaster
- Bahadoor as Kellapan Nair, Ravi's driver
- Sunanda as Ammini
- Sreenivasan as P.T. Master
- Jalaja as Madhavikutty, Unni's Mother
- Jagathy Sreekumar as Mesthari
- Santhosh as Unni
- Cochin Haneefa as Hanifa
- Sherin as Ravi
- Santhakumari as Nanniyamma
- Prathima as Devika, as Ravi's mother
- Premji

== Soundtrack ==
The music was composed by G. Devarajan and the lyrics were written by P. Bhaskaran.

No.	Song	Singers	Lyrics	Length (m:ss)
1	"Devatha Njaan"	P. Madhuri	P. Bhaskaran	
2	"Enikku Venda Enikku Venda"	P. Jayachandran	P. Bhaskaran	
3	"Ennaaliniyoru Kadha"	P. Madhuri, K. P. Brahmanandan, Gopan, Latha Raju, Sherin Peters	P. Bhaskaran	
4	"Etho Nadiyude Theerathil"	P. Madhuri	P. Bhaskaran	
5	"Ethra Pushpangal Munnil Sakhee"	K. J. Yesudas	P. Bhaskaran	
6	"Mannnil Ningal Udayamaay"	P. Susheela, Chorus	P. Bhaskaran	
