= Gehri Chaal =

- Theatrical release poster
- Directed by: C. V. Sridhar
- Written by: Rajendra Krishan (dialogues and lyrics)
- Screenplay by: C. V. Sridhar
- Story by: C. V. Sridhar
- Produced by: C. V. Sridhar
- Starring: Jeetendra; Amitabh Bachchan; Hema Malini
- Cinematography: U. Raja Gopal
- Edited by: N. M. Shankar
- Music by: Laxmikant–Pyarelal
- Production company: Chitralaya
- Release date: 27 July 1973
- Running time: 160 minutes
- Country: India
- Language: Hindi

Gehri Chaal (transl. Deep Trap) is a 1973 Indian Hindi-language action-thriller film, produced and directed by C. V. Sridhar under the Chithrakala Pictures banner. It stars Jeetendra, Amitabh Bachchan, Hema Malini and music composed by Laxmikant–Pyarelal. The director remade the movie in Tamil in 1975 as Vaira Nenjam.

== Plot ==
Dharamchand is the Chairman of Olympic Bank, which is due for a final audit by the 30th of the month. Shortly thereafter, his daughter, Hema, finds his dead body in his bedroom. She immediately phones her brother, Ratan, who arrives and finds a suicide note in his father's room claiming that he had embezzled 20 lakhs from the bank, is unable to repay it, and hence is killing himself. Ratan decides to protect the good name of the family and does not tell anyone about the suicide note to anyone, including Hema. Shortly thereafter, Ratan is approached by a blackmailer named Shekhar, who threatens to expose Ratan's secret if Ratan does not participate in a bank robbery that will take place two days before the final audit. Ratan assists him, the robbery takes place, the money is looted, all bank records are burnt, and the robbers make a successful getaway. Ratan is relieved that this problem has been resolved and the family name is not tarnished. The only problem is that Hema saw the robbers in action, and can identify one of them, a woman named Shobha. When she tells Ratan, he asks her to keep this information a secret. Then Ratan's friend, Sagar, arrives from Delhi for a visit, and it is here that Ratan finds out that Sagar is in a profession that has made him a suspect with the police, and may rip open the secret that Ratan has been trying to hide from the world. Soon it is revealed that Sagar is a CBI officer and he has been sent to find out the evidence for the Olympic Bank robbery. After inquiry, Sagar finds out that the main suspect is Madan, who is Ratan's best friend. Now, Ratan and Sagar meet Shobha and pressurize her to tell everything about Madan. By the way, Madan shoots her before she says anything about him. Before dying, Shobha confesses that Dharamchand didn't commit suicide, but was murdered by Madan, who had embezzled 20 lakhs from the bank through Dharamchand and didn't want to repay the loan.

== Cast ==
- Jeetendra as Sagar
- Amitabh Bachchan as Ratan
- Hema Malini as Hema
- Bindu as Shobha
- Prem Chopra as Madan
- P. Jairaj as Dharamchand
- Chandrashekhar as Shekhar

== Soundtrack ==
All songs were written by Rajendra Krishan.

Song	Singer
"Jaipur Ki Choli Mangwa De Re Saiyan, Kesar Ke Rang Mein"	Kishore Kumar, Asha Bhosle
"Ae Bai, Tu Kahan Se Aayi"	Kishore Kumar
"De Tali Bade Zor Se"	Lata Mangeshkar
"Bada Pyara Lage Tu"	Asha Bhosle
"Sham Bheegi Bheegi"	Asha Bhosle
"Mara Vade Ne Tere Aise"	Asha Bhosle
