= Punar Janmam =

- Theatrical release poster
- Directed by: R. S. Mani
- Screenplay by: C. V. Sridhar
- Story by: Amiya Chakraborthy
- Produced by: N. S. Diraviyam
- Starring: Sivaji Ganesan; Padmini; Ragini
- Cinematography: A. Vincent
- Edited by: P. V. Narayanan
- Music by: T. Chalapathi Rao
- Production company: Vijaya Films
- Release date: 21 April 1961
- Running time: 148 minutes
- Country: India
- Language: Tamil

Punar Janmam (transl. Rebirth) is a 1961 Indian Tamil-language film directed by R. S. Mani. The film stars Sivaji Ganesan, Padmini and Ragini. It was released on 21 April 1961.

== Plot ==
Shankar is a successful artist and lives with his mother. He takes to alcohol, and as a result, messes up his life. A woman in his village, Parvathi, is in love with him, but she is unable to make him quit alcohol. Her brother's wife Kamakshi, however, hates Parvathi, and when she wins ₹1 lakh (equivalent to ₹88 lakh or US$92,000 in 2023) in a lottery, it only makes her headstrong. Parvathi suffers the brunt of her ill-treatment. Kamakshi's daughter, Pushpa, meanwhile, falls in love with her teacher. The mother decides to get them married even though her son does not approve.

To change himself, Shankar goes to Madras, leads a reformed life, and earns well with his artistic skills. Kamakshi, meanwhile, brings his family house to auction. Shankar's mother is shocked and later dies. At the last minute, Shankar comes with his earnings and stops the auction. He leaves his village once more. Parvathi, who is engaged to marry someone, is heartbroken and consumes poison. Shankar rushes to save her and gives her a new lease of life and the lovers are united.

== Cast ==
- Sivaji Ganesan as Shankar
- Padmini as Parvathi
- Ragini as Pushpa
- Kannamba as Shankar's mother
- Sundari Bai as Kamakshi
- K. A. Thangavelu as Jagannathan
- T. R. Ramachandran as Nithyanantham

== Production ==
The film was produced by N. S. Draviam (N. S. Krishnan’s brother), under the banner of Vijaya Films. The film was directed by R. S. Mani, who trained under the American Tamil filmmaker, Ellis R. Dungan. This film was written by C. V. Sridhar. Aloysius Vincent was the cinematographer while the choreography was handled by Madhavan, Hiralal and Sohanlal.

== Themes ==
Punar Janmam highlights the dangers of alcoholism. Film historian Randor Guy notes that the scene where Shankar saves Parvathi and gives her "a new lease of life" reflects the film's title, which means "rebirth".

== Soundtrack ==
The soundtrack was composed by T. Chalapathi Rao. A song, Paadam Sariyaa Master sung by Trichi Loganathan and Jikki was objected to by the censor board on the grounds that it undermines the relationship between teacher and student. However, the gramophone record has already been released. The song was altered in the film as Podhum Saridhaan Mister and was sung by P. B. Srinivas and Jikki.

Song	Singers	Lyrics	Length
"Kannadi Pathirathil"	P. Susheela	Pattukkottai Kalyanasundaram	03:08
"Urundodum Naalil"	P. Susheela	Pattukkottai Kalyanasundaram	02:42
"Endrum Thunbamillai" [Female]	P. Susheela	Pattukkottai Kalyanasundaram	02:18
"Endrum Thunbamillai" [Male]	T. M. Soundararajan	Pattukkottai Kalyanasundaram	02:48
"Ullangal Ondragi"	A. M. Rajah & P. Susheela	Pattukkottai Kalyanasundaram	03:17
"Engum Sondhamillai Endha Oorumillai"	P. B. Srinivas	Subbu. Arumugam	02:59
"Podhum Sarithaan Mister"	P. B. Srinivas & Jikki	Subbu. Arumugam	03:14
"Paadam Sariyaa Master"	Thiruchi Loganathan & Jikki	Subbu. Arumugam	03:14
"Manam Aadudhu Paadudhu"	Jikki & S. Janaki	A. Maruthakasi	04:10
"Naanillai Endral"	Seerkazhi Govindarajan, S. Janaki & A. V. Saraswathi	Kannadasan	06:20

== Reception ==
Kalki's review criticised the story for lack of originality, but appreciated only the climax as innovative. According to Randor Guy, the film did not do well "as the story line was familiar".
