= Kalyana Parisu =

1959 film by C. V. Sridhar

- Theatrical release poster
- Directed by: Sridhar
- Written by: Sridhar
- Produced by: S. Krishnamoorthy; T. Govindarajan; Sridhar
- Starring: Gemini Ganesan; B. Saroja Devi
- Cinematography: A. Vincent
- Edited by: N. M. Shankar
- Music by: A. M. Rajah
- Production company: Venus Pictures
- Release date: 9 April 1959
- Running time: 194 minutes
- Country: India
- Language: Tamil
- Budget: ₹1 lakh

Kalyana Parisu (transl. Wedding Gift) is a 1959 Indian Tamil-language romantic drama film written and directed by Sridhar. The film stars Gemini Ganesan and B. Saroja Devi while K. A. Thangavelu, Vijayakumari, M. Saroja, S. D. Subbulakshmi, A. Nageswara Rao and M. N. Nambiar play supporting roles. A triangular love story, it is about two close sisters whose lives turn upside down when they both fall in love with the same man. Out of respect, the younger sister decides to sacrifice her love, unknown to the elder sister.

Kalyana Parisu was the directorial debut of Sridhar, who co-produced it with his partners S. Krishnamoorthy and T. Govindarajan under Venus Pictures. It also marked the cinematic debut of T. A. Sadagoppan (later known as Chitralaya Gopu) who worked as associate writer, and the debut of A. M. Rajah as a music composer in Tamil. Cinematography was handled by A. Vincent, and editing by N. M. Shankar.

Kalyana Parisu was released on 9 April 1959. It was critically acclaimed, particularly for eschewing formulaic Tamil cinema conventions like long dialogues and fixed-point cinematography in favour of short verses with simple words and camera mobility. The film was commercially successful, running for over 25 weeks in theatres and thereby becoming a silver jubilee film. At the 7th National Film Awards, it won the Certificate of Merit for Best Feature Film in Tamil.

Kalyana Parisu emerged a milestone in Tamil cinema, and the breakthrough for Saroja Devi and Rajah. Its success led to Sridhar launching his own production company Chitralaya, and set the pattern for his later works in which he repeated the motif of the eternal triangle and unrequited love. The comedy subplot written by Gopu involving Thangavelu and M. Saroja gained popularity, and was sold separately on audio cassettes and vinyl records. The film was later remade by Sridhar in Telugu as Pelli Kanuka (1960) and Hindi as Nazrana (1961), and in Malayalam by J. Sasikumar as Sammanam (1975).

== Plot ==
Baskar and Vasanthi are college mates. When Baskar sends a love letter to Vasanthi, she complains to the dean, who dismisses Baskar from college. Baskar later manages to obtain employment at a tea company with the help of his friend Sampath, who also shelters him since Baskar is homeless. Vasanthi approaches Baskar and apologises for her earlier actions. Baskar forgives her, and they both fall in love. Vasanthi lives with her mother and unmarried elder sister Geetha. Baskar rents the vacant portion of their house.

One day when Baskar falls ill, Geetha nurses him and in the process, falls in love with him. She confides her love to Vasanthi who is heartbroken but decides to sacrifice her love out of respect for her sister. Since Geetha was responsible for raising Vasanthi, she is granted her wish, and Vasanthi convinces Baskar to marry Geetha.

After Baskar and Geetha marry, they shift to Coimbatore where Baskar has been transferred. Meanwhile, Vasanthi has obtained employment as a typist. Her manager Raghu falls in love with her and expresses his desire to marry her, but she is unable to respond to his feelings.

Baskar is unable to lead a happy life as he often thinks about his disappointment in love. Vasanthi writes to Baskar advising him to forget about the past and lead a happy life with Geetha; he relents. Shortly thereafter, Geetha becomes pregnant and returns to her original home where she delivers a son named Babu. Raghu again meets Vasanthi and proposes to her, but she tells him about her past and expresses her inability to respond to his love. Heartbroken, Raghu leaves her and resigns from his job.

Vasanthi joins Geetha at their Coimbatore house following her mother's death. When Geetha falls ill, Vasanthi attends to all the household work. Baskar spends more time with Vasanthi than his wife, who suspects them of being in a relationship, and berates them both. Due to this, Vasanthi leaves them.

Geetha, having realised that Baskar and Vasanthi loved each other, dies in guilt, leaving Baskar alone to bring up Babu, making him promise that he will find Vasanthi and make her the child's mother. He searches for Vasanthi all over the city, to no avail. Meanwhile, Vasanthi meets with an accident but is saved by a wealthy old man who allows her to stay in his house. The man's son arrives and is revealed to be Raghu, who Vasanthi agrees to marry. Through Sampath, Baskar learns about Vasanthi's impending marriage and rushes to the marriage hall with Babu. However, by the time they arrive, Vasanthi is already married. Baskar then leaves Babu to her as a wedding gift and walks away.

== Cast ==
- Gemini Ganesan as Baskar
- B. Saroja Devi as Vasanthi
- K. A. Thangavelu as Sampath
- Vijayakumari as Geetha
- M. Saroja as Malini
- S. D. Subbulakshmi as Vasanthi and Geetha's mother
- A. Nageswara Rao as Raghu
- M. N. Nambiar as Raghu's father
- Babu as Babu

== Production ==
=== Development ===
After the success of the Venus Pictures production Uthama Puthiran (1958), its screenwriter Sridhar was keen on creating the story for his next film. He thought of various stories, eventually finalising on a triangular love story where two sisters fall in love the same man, with one sister sacrificing her love for the other's sake; he believed this sacrifice would be a strength. This story would eventually evolve into the film Kalyana Parisu, Sridhar's directorial debut. It was produced by Sridhar and his Venus partners S. Krishnamurthi and T. Govindarajan. Govindarajan initially did not like the plot as he found it similar to Amara Deepam (1956) for which Sridhar also wrote the script but later agreed to produce the film.

Film historian Film News Anandan said the other producers did not have much faith in Sridhar's directing skills. He also claimed to have been the only person who Sridhar narrated the climax to. T. A. Sadagoppan (later known as Chitralaya Gopu) a childhood friend of Sridhar, joined as an associate writer for the film, thereby making his cinematic debut. Gopu recalled that Sridhar turned up at his office and said, "Quit this job now and come with me. I will be directing a film soon," and Gopu readily agreed. He was chosen to write the film's comedy subplot. A. Vincent handled the cinematography and N. M. Shankar was the editor, while Ganga was in charge of the art direction.

=== Casting and filming ===
B. Saroja Devi and Vijayakumari played the sisters Vasanthi and Geetha respectively, while Gemini Ganesan played the male lead Baskar. Rajasulochana was Sridhar's initial choice for Vijayakumari's character. Although Ganesan had contracted typhoid fever, Sridhar felt only he could do "justice to the role" and decided to wait for him to get better before casting him. K. A. Thangavelu and M. Saroja were signed for the comedy sequences. Thangavelu portrayed Baskar's friend Sampath, who masquerades as a faux writer named Bhairavan, and Saroja portrayed Sampath's wife Malini. The character was inspired by Gopu's wife Kamala. According to historian M. L. Narasimhan, Sridhar cast Telugu actor A. Nageswara Rao as Vasanthi's boss Raghu because of Rao's popularity among Tamil audiences, coupled with the fact that Sridhar wrote the dialogues for the Tamil dubbed versions of many of Rao's films. M. N. Nambiar portrayed Raghu's father, deviating from the negative roles he was generally known for. Child actor Babu portrayed Baskar's son by the same name in his debut.

The scene where Sampath lies to Malini about his profession was filmed in a single take. Sridhar, despite providing the required dialogues, asked Thangavelu to improvise on them so as to make the humour more spontaneous. Gopu has stated that Sampath was inspired by his school friend Venkatesh, "a compulsive liar." He described himself as the inspiration behind Mannar and Co, a faux company invented by Sampath. Gopu said that since he came from an orthodox family, he could not tell his in-laws that he was working in films; he would lie to them that he was working at a shipping firm named "Mannar and Co". For the song "Vaadikkai Maranthathum", Saroja Devi learned how to ride a cycle. The final length of the film was 17,493 feet (5,332 m), and its budget was ₹1 lakh (equivalent to ₹92 lakh or US$95,000 in 2023). (Note: The exchange rate in 1959 was 4.79 Indian rupees (₹) to one dollar (US$).) While watching the preview of the film, Govindarajan was dissatisfied with the climax but opted against changing it.

== Soundtrack ==
The soundtrack was composed by A. M. Rajah, his first Tamil film as music composer, while the lyrics were written by Pattukkottai Kalyanasundaram. When Sridhar told Kalyanasundaram told the complete storyline of Kalyana Parisu in detail, Kalyanasundaram felt it was too "longwinded" and summed it up in two lines: "Kaathalile tholviyutraal kanni oruthi, kalangukiral avanai nenjil niruthi" (A virgin had lost her love, she is heartbroken about him). Sridhar was surprised at this since he had struggled to develop the storyline for months. Though initially depressed, he felt the lines were true and asked Kalyanasundaram to develop them into a song; the result was "Kaathalile Tholviyutraal". According to Sridhar, the song was originally "meant as a criticism! So, one shouldn't be scared of criticism. We should use it to catalyze our imagination." The Diwali-themed song "Unnaikkandu Naanada" is set in Bilahari, a Carnatic raga. The song "Tea Tea Tea", sung by Sirkazhi Govindarajan, is picturised on Sampath, a tea seller, and deviated from the divine, philosophical songs Govindarajan was generally known for. The film follows a then convention of Tamil cinema to feature the same song sung twice: once in joy and once in sorrow.

A version of the soundtrack released by Odeon Records in 1983 includes only four songs: "Thullatha Manamum", P. Susheela's version of "Unnaikkandu Naanada" (listed as "Unnaikandu"), "Vaadikkai Maranthathum" and "Mangayar Mugathil" (listed as "Akkalukku Valaikappu"). A version released by EMI in 1995 includes all songs except "Tea Tea Tea", and "Mangayar Mugathil" is listed as "Mangayar Mugathil (Akkalukku)". The songs "Kaathalile Tholviyutraal" and "Kaathalile Tholviyutraan" are listed as two separate tracks in this version; however, in the tracklist released by Saregama in 2015, they are listed as a single merged track.

Saregama tracklist
No.	Title	Lyrics	Singer(s)	Length
1.	"Aasaiyinaale Manam"	Pattukkottai Kalyanasundaram	A. M. Rajah, P. Susheela	3:28
2.	"Unnaikkandu Naanada"	Pattukkottai Kalyanasundaram	P. Susheela	3:20
3.	"Kaathalile Tholviyutraal (Note: Exists as two separate tracks in the 1995 EMI edition; the first, titled "Kaathalile Tholviyutraal", contains only Susheela's vocals and the second, titled "Kaathalile Tholviyutraan", contains only Rajah's vocals.)"	Pattukkottai Kalyanasundaram	P. Susheela, A. M. Rajah	3:20
4.	"Tea Tea Tea"	Pattukkottai Kalyanasundaram	Sirkazhi Govindarajan	3:11
5.	"Vaadikkai Maranthathum"	Pattukkottai Kalyanasundaram	A. M. Rajah, P. Susheela	4:24
6.	"Unnaikkandu Naan vaada" (Pathos)	Pattukkottai Kalyanasundaram	A. M. Rajah	4:13
7.	"Thullatha Manamum"	Pattukkottai Kalyanasundaram	Jikki	3:57
8.	"Mangayar Mugathil"	Pattukkottai Kalyanasundaram	P. Susheela, K. Jamuna Rani, Chorus	5:05

== Release ==
Kalyana Parisu was released on 9 April 1959. When it was released in the Casino theatre in Madras (now Chennai), it was publicised with 100 ft by 30 ft banners of the film's important scenes. Despite facing competition from another Gemini Ganesan film Nalla Theerpu, released on the same day, Kalyana Parisu became a major box office success, running for over 25 weeks in theatres, thereby becoming a silver jubilee film. (Note: A silver jubilee film is one that completes a theatrical run of 25 weeks.) Historian S. Theodore Baskaran attributed the film's success "in large part to its music composed by [A. M. Raja], who was at his peak as a playback singer." Ganesan visited the theatre Thirumalai Talkies for the film's 75-day celebrations. On the film's 100th day celebrations, Thangavelu and M. Saroja were married at the Murugan Temple in Madurai.

=== Critical reception ===
Kalyana Parisu received critical acclaim. It was praised for eschewing long dialogues in favour of short verses with simple words to touch the heart, and Vincent's camera mobility instead of being fixed to one point like many Tamil films then. On 10 April 1959, The Indian Express said, "The picture has powerful story value and many tender moments. Gemini Ganesan, B. Saroja Devi, C. R. Vijayakumari and A. Nageswara Rao have all given sensitive performances" and commented positively on Thangavelu's comedy. Sekar of the Tamil magazine Ananda Vikatan, in its 26 April 1959 issue, appreciated the fact that the film had no villain, and everyone had a good heart. He praised the performances of Ganesan and Saroja Devi, writing that the latter showed the three emotions – love, sacrifice and duty – excellently. Sekar concluded that in totality, the film deserved a prize for its story, a prize for its acting and a prize for its dialogues. Kanthan of Kalki wrote.

Later reviews have been less positive. S. Krishnaswamy of the magazine Film Word, in 1970, called it "an otherwise imperfect and aesthetically crude film". In his 1996 book The Eye of The Serpent, Theodore Baskaran said the comedy subplot did not fit into the main storyline and was not cinematic.

=== Accolades ===
At the 7th National Film Awards, Kalyana Parisu won the Certificate of Merit for Best Feature Film in Tamil.

== Legacy ==
Kalyana Parisu emerged a milestone in Tamil cinema, and the breakthrough for Saroja Devi and A. M. Rajah. The success of its songs made Susheela a leading female playback singer of Tamil cinema. With the film's success, Sridhar launched his own production company, Chithralaya. Kalyana Parisu also set the pattern for Sridhar's later works in which he repeated the motif of the eternal triangle and unrequited love. It also set a precedent for Tamil films where "a friend, brother or sister sacrifices their love for another". According to French film historian Yves Thoraval, it established Sridhar's reputation as a director of melodramatic films focusing on "star-crossed love affairs involving three persons". The comedy subplot gained popularity, and was sold separately on audio cassettes and vinyl records. The term "Mannar and Company" (or "Mannar and Co") later entered Tamil vernacular, with it meaning a hoax job, while also referring to an unemployed husband.

== In popular culture ==
In a scene from Avvai Shanmughi (1996), when Viswanatha Iyer (Gemini Ganesan) is shocked to hear that Shanmugi (Kamal Haasan) is married, "Kaathalile Tholviyutraan" is played in the background. Malathi Rangarajan of The Hindu, in her review of Parthiban Kanavu (2003) mentioned that comedy track performed by Vivek in the film "has touches of the Thangavelu-M. Saroja track in Sridhar's Kalyana Parisu".

== Other versions ==
Sridhar remade Kalyana Parisu in Telugu as Pelli Kanuka (1960). Saroja Devi returned as Vasanthi, while Nageswara Rao replaced Ganesan as Baskar. Sridhar also directed the Hindi remake Nazrana (1961), which had Ganesan in the role originally played by Nageswara Rao in Tamil. The film was remade in Malayalam by J. Sasikumar as Sammanam (1975). Kalyana Parisu also inspired the Telugu film Devata (1982) and its Hindi remake Tohfa (1984), both directed by K. Raghavendra Rao.

== Bibliography ==
- Baskaran, S. Theodore (1996). The Eye of The Serpent: An Introduction to Tamil Cinema. Chennai: East West Books.
- Ganesh, Narayani (2011). Eternal Romantic: My Father, Gemini Ganesan. New Delhi: Lustre Press. p. 63. ISBN 978-81-7436-578-1.
- Rajadhyaksha, Ashish; Willemen, Paul (1998) [1994]. Encyclopaedia of Indian Cinema. British Film Institute and Oxford University Press. ISBN 0-19-563579-5.
- Thoraval, Yves (2000). The cinemas of India. India: Macmillan. ISBN 0-333-93410-5.
