= Nakhangal (1973 film) =

Indian film by A. Vincent

- Directed by: A. Vincent
- Screenplay by: Thoppil Bhasi
- Story by: Vaikom Chandrasekharan Nair
- Produced by: Hari Pothan
- Starring: Madhu; Jayabharathi; K. R. Vijaya; Kaviyoor Ponnamma
- Cinematography: A. Venkat; K. Suryaprakash
- Edited by: G Venkittaraman
- Music by: G. Devarajan
- Production company: Supriya Films
- Release date: 8 September 1973
- Country: India
- Language: Malayalam

Nakhangal (transl. Nails) is a 1973 Indian Malayalam-language film, directed by A. Vincent and produced by Hari Pothan. It is based on the novel of the same name by Vaikom Chandrasekharan Nair. The film stars Madhu, Jayabharathi, K. R. Vijaya and Kaviyoor Ponnamma. It was released on 8 September 1973.

== Plot ==
Nakhangal meaning 'nails' essentially dealt with an owner of a tea estate who believes in the ideals of a political party that fights for the rights of the workers, because she was a labourer-turned- estate owner which K.R Vijaya does in the film. The story follows the template of two murder cases. Saraswathi (K. R. Vijaya), an inmate of an orphanage who believes in the ideals of a political party that fights for the rights of the working class is married to Mathew, an estate owner. The story of the film starts five days after the brutal murder of Mathew. A young graduate, Sankarankutty (Madhu) is appointed by Saraswathi Mathew as the Manager of the estate following the death of her husband. The past life of the important characters is narrated by powerful dialogues, rather than in usual visual "flashbacks" . A young leader of the estate workers, Yesudas (Raghavan), an estate worker Muthappan (C. A. Balan) and Saraswathi Mathew are the prime suspects in the case. Later, Muthappan is also murdered. Police frame false charges against Saraswathi Mathew . The local police was twisting the murder case in favour of real culprits, the estate owners Ramunni Menon (Veeran), John Sebastian ( Paravoor Bharathan ) and their group who murdered Mathew by mixing poison in the coffee served to him through Mathew's servant Pankiyamma (T. R. Omana). They murdered Muthappan also who witnessed Mathew's murder. Sankarankutty succeeds in unfolding the mysteries behind the murder of Mathew and Muthappan and saves Saraswathi Mathew from the false charges. Sankarankutty's lover Gomathi (Jayabharathi) and Yesudas are children of the party worker Achuthan Nair (Sankaradi) who were brought up in their childhood by Saraswathi when they were admitted to the orphanage following the death of their mother. Later Gomathi was brought up by a party worker Pappunni (S. P. Pillai). Ramunni Menon and his group is arrested by the crime branch. The film ends with a message – the real owners of the estates are the "workers" who built up the estates with their hard work. Saraswathi Mathew hands over the estate to the Union of the workers and leaves to the orphanage from where she came. But the local bureaucratic estate owners who were against his" pro workers policy" murdered him.

== Cast ==
- Madhu as Sankarankutty
- Jayabharathi as Gomu
- K. R. Vijaya as Saraswathy Mathew
- Kaviyoor Ponnamma as Kaakkachi
- KPAC Lalitha as Maya
- Adoor Bhasi as Jose
- Thikkurissy Sukumaran Nair as Judge
- Muthukulam Raghavan Pillai as Paili
- Sankaradi
- T. R. Omana as Pankiyamma
- Raghavan as Yesudas
- T. S. Muthaiah as Advocate Shivakumar
- C. A. Balan as Muthappan
- Bahadoor as Pappukkutty
- K. P. Ummer
- Meena as Annamma
- Paravoor Bharathan as John Sebastian
- Radhamani
- S. P. Pillai as Pappunni
- Veeran

== Soundtrack ==
The music was composed by G. Devarajan and the lyrics were written by Vayalar Ramavarma.

Song	Singers
"Gandharva Nagarangal"	P. Madhuri
"Krishnapakshakkili Chilachu"	K. J. Yesudas, P. Madhuri
"Maathaave Mathaave"	P. Susheela
"Nakshathrangale Saakshi"	K. J. Yesudas, Chorus
"Pushpamangalayam Bhoomikku"	K. J. Yesudas
