= Dharti (1970 film) =

1970 Indian film by C. V. Sridhar

- Poster
- Directed by: C. V. Sridhar
- Written by: C. V. Sridhar; Rajinder Kishan (dialogue)
- Based on: Sivandha Mann
- Produced by: C. V. Sridhar
- Starring: Rajendra Kumar; Waheeda Rehman
- Cinematography: K. H. Kapadia
- Edited by: N. M. Shankar
- Music by: Shankar-Jaikishan
- Production company: Chitralaya
- Release date: 6 February 1970
- Country: India
- Language: Hindi

Dharti (transl. Earth) is a 1970 Indian Hindi-language action film written and directed by C. V. Sridhar. It stars Rajendra Kumar, Waheeda Rehman, and Sivaji Ganesan in lead roles. It is a remake of the 1969 Tamil language film Sivandha Mann. The film performed below average at the box office.

== Plot ==
Vasantpur is a small princely state bordering India during the British Raj. It is ruled by a kind king, but his Diwan, who is a cruel administrator, plans to take over Vasantpur with the help of Dutch powers. When Diwan kills people in large numbers. Anand, who lost his father in the shootout, swears that he will have revenge for the outrage. Meanwhile Bharat; son of the royal Inspector General Chandrashekhar, gets his higher education from Switzerland. There, he meets the King's daughter, Princess Chitralekha. Quickly, they both fall for each other. Bharat and Chithralekha court as they tour all over Europe, but when Chithralekha hears about the danger in her homeland, she has to return. Bharat also agrees to come, as he too gets a message from his fellow friends that Vasantpur is in the clutches of the cruel Diwan. During the flight to India, one of the flight attendants announces that Diwan wants to marry the princess and will receive her at the airport. Chitralekha is not happy and commands that the flight take a different turn, but the attendant stops her escape. Bharat fights the attendant and in the process, the flight plunges into the sea. Bharat and Chitralekha are presumed dead, but are washed ashore onto an island unconscious. They are cured by two local doctors who befriend them, and arrange a special raft for their return to Vasantpur with Princess Chitralekha disguised as a commoner Jwala. he next day, people again protest at Diwan, who starts killing them all; Anand dies in the shootout. Anand's mother also dies in the shock of her son's death, so Bharat and his friends are more determined to save Vasanthapuri. They kill a few of Diwan's men, and seek shelter in a bar whose owner Dickie also becomes their ally. Following their adventures, they take Dikky and Rosey under their wing. When their two attempts to kill Diwan are foiled, they devise a plan to kill Diwan in his own palace. But the cruel Diwan has imprisoned both Chandrashekhar and the King and wants to become Vasantpur's king. Later at Diwan's castle, Jwala finally reveals herself as princess Chithralekha, and shocks everyone. Diwan immediately kidnaps her and boards a hot air balloon. But Bharat manages to reach him and, after an intense fight, kills Diwan. Peace returns to Vasantpur, while Bharat and Chithralekha are married.

== Cast ==
- Rajendra Kumar as Bharat
- Waheeda Rehman as Princess Chitralekha / Jwala
- Sivaji Ganesan as Anand
- Kumkum as Rosy
- Balraj Sahni as IG Chandrashekhar
- Ajit as Diwan
- Kamini Kaushal as Janki
- Rajendranath as Dikki
- Sudesh Kumar as Ranjeet
- Pahari Sanyal as King of Vasantpur
- Ram Mohan as Mangal
- Naval Kumar as Rebel

== Soundtrack ==
The soundtrack was composed by Shankar Jaikishan.

Song	Singer
"Khuda Bhi Aasman Se"	Mohammed Rafi
"Jab Se Aankhen Ho Gayi"	Mohammed Rafi
"Yeh Mausam Bheega Bheega Hai, Hawa Bhi Zyada Zyada Hai"	Mohammed Rafi, Lata Mangeshkar
"Yeh Albeli Pyar Ki Raahen, Yeh Jane Pehchane Raste"	Mohammed Rafi, Lata Mangeshkar
"Ishq Ki Main Beemar Ki Vallah"	Lata Mangeshkar
"Meri Gali Mein Aaya Chor"	Lata Mangeshkar
"Dheere Dheere Bolo"	Asha Bhosle
