= Baadada Hoo =

- Directed by: K. V. Jayaram
- Written by: Saisuthe (Based on a novel of same name)
- Produced by: K. S. Narayan
- Starring: Anant Nag; Padmapriya; K. S. Ashwath
- Cinematography: B. S. Basavaraj
- Edited by: P. Bhaktavatsalam
- Music by: Ashwath-Vaidi
- Production company: KSN Movies
- Release date: 1982
- Running time: 158 minutes
- Country: India
- Language: Kannada

Baadada Hoo is a 1982 Kannada-language film directed by K. V. Jayaram and produced by K. S. Narayan. The story is based on the novel of the same name written by Saisuthe. The film stars Anant Nag, Padmapriya and K. S. Ashwath.

The film's score and songs were composed by Ashwath-Vaidi and it fetched the Third Best Film award at the Karnataka State Film Awards for the year 1981–82. The performance of the lead roles played by Anant Nag and Padmapriya were praised by the critics as well as audience.

== Plot ==
Hema is a girl from a poor household who is forced to work to earn a living. Trouble ensues when she finds employment in a place owned by a man she shares a bitter past with.

== Cast ==
- Anant Nag as Prasad
- Padmapriya as Hema
- K. S. Ashwath as Murthy
- Loknath as Venkata Rao
- Shivaram as Raghavendra Rao
- Vijay Kashi as Dr. Mohan
- Advani Lakshmi Devi as Parvati
- Mysore Lokesh as Ramakrishna
- Dingri Nagaraj as Mylari
- Uma Shivakumar as Seetha
- Sampath as Prasad's father
- Ramakrishna as Shyamsundar
- Mandeep Roy
- Baby Rekha as Usha
- Rathidevi (Malayalam actress) as Mala
- Sudha Sindoor as Susheela

== Soundtrack ==
The music was composed by the Ashwath - Vaidi duo, with lyrics by Chi. Udaya Shankar and Prof. Doddarangegowda.

Track listing
| No. | Title | Singer(s) | Length |
|---|---|---|---|
| 1. | "Hoova Nodu Entha Andavagide" | S. P. Balasubrahmanyam, S. Janaki |
| 2. | "Neenendu Baadada Hoo" | S. P. Balasubrahmanyam, S. Janaki |
| 3. | "Nalivina Baalige" | S. P. Balasubrahmanyam |
| 4. | "Aase Noorase" | S. Janaki |
| 5. | "Prema Nouke" | Vani Jairam |

== Awards ==
- Karnataka State Award for Third Best Film
