= Anaavaranam =

- Directed by: A. Vincent
- Written by: Thoppil Bhasi
- Screenplay by: Thoppil Bhasi
- Produced by: K. J. Joseph
- Starring: T. Chandran nair Sathar; Janardanan; Rani Chandra
- Cinematography: Soorya Prakash
- Edited by: G. Venkittaraman
- Music by: G. Devarajan
- Production company: Cherupushpam Films
- Distributed by: Cherupushpam Films
- Release date: 30 April 1976
- Country: India
- Language: Malayalam

Anaavaranam is a 1976 Indian Malayalam film, directed by A. Vincent and produced by K. J. Joseph. The film stars T. Chandran nair, Sathar, Janardanan and Rani Chandra in the lead roles. The film has musical score by G. Devarajan.

== Cast ==
- T. Chandran nair
- Sathaar
- Rekha Gopinathan Pillai
- Janardanan
- Rani Chandra
- Shylaja
- Usharani
- KPAC Sunny

== Soundtrack ==
The music was composed by G. Devarajan and the lyrics were written by Vayalar Ramavarma.

No.	Song	Singers	Lyrics	Length (m:ss)
1	"Nanma Niranjoru"	P. Leela, P. Madhuri	Vayalar Ramavarma	
2	"Pachakarpooramalayil"	P. Susheela	Vayalar	
3	"Saraswatheeyaamam Kazhinju"	K. J. Yesudas	Vayalar	
4	"Thevi Thiru Thevi"	P. Madhuri	Vayalar	
5	"Thinthinathim"	K. J. Yesudas, P. Madhuri	Vayalar	
