= Kuppathu Raja (1979 film) =

- Theatrical release poster
- Directed by: T. R. Ramanna
- Screenplay by: A. L. Narayanan
- Produced by: S. Aarumugalakshmi; T. R. Nalini
- Starring: Rajinikanth; Vijayakumar; Manjula Vijayakumar; Padmapriya
- Cinematography: J. G. Vijayam; V. Suresh
- Edited by: K. Narayanan
- Music by: M. S. Viswanathan
- Production company: Surya Lakshmi Pictures
- Release date: 12 January 1979
- Running time: 134 minutes
- Country: India
- Language: Tamil

Kuppathu Raja (transl. King of the slums) is a 1979 Indian Tamil-language film, directed by T. R. Ramanna. The film stars Rajinikanth, Vijayakumar, Manjula Vijayakumar and Padmapriya. It is a remake of the 1972 Hindi film Do Yaar.

Kuppathu Raja was released in theatres on 12 January 1979, Pongal day along with Kamal Haasan's Neeya?. Although it was appreciated for Rajinikanth's style and acting, the film became a commercial failure during its release.

== Cast ==
- Rajinikanth as Jakku / Jayakumar
- Vijayakumar as Selvam
- Manjula Vijayakumar as Mynaa
- Padmapriya as Kasthuri
- S. A. Ashokan as Govind
- Vennira Aadai Moorthy as Nallakannu
- Manorama as Pavunu
- C. I. D. Sakunthala as Dancer
- Loose Mohan as Druncard
- Typist Gopu

== Soundtrack ==
All songs were written by Kannadasan and composed by M. S. Viswanathan.

| Song title | Singers(s) | Length |
|---|---|---|
| "Thinthom Thinthom" | Vani Jairam | 5:15 |
| "Ammamma Aasai" | Vani Jairam | 4:21 |
| "Kodikatti Parakkudada" | Malaysia Vasudevan, L. R. Eswari, Manorama | 4:22 |
| "Puli Varudhu" | S. P. Balasubrahmanyam, S. Janaki | 4:20 |

== Critical reception ==
P. S. M. of Kalki said the film could be watched for Rajinikanth's performance. Naagai Dharuman of Anna praised the acting, humour, dialogues, music, cinematography and direction.
