= M. Saroja =

Indian actress and comedian

- Born: 1933
- Died: 2 April 2012; Chennai
- Occupations: Actress, Comedian
- Spouse: K. A. Thangavelu (m. 1959; died 1994)
- Children: Sumathi (b. 1961)

M. Saroja was an Indian actress and comedian who worked in Tamil cinema. She was frequently paired alongside K. A. Thangavelu.

== Career ==
Director K. Subramaniam introduced Saroja to the film industry, when she was 14 years old. She played the role of leading Tamil actor M. G. Ramachandran’s cousin in the film Sarvadhikari, her debut. Later on, she continued to act in more than 300 films in Tamil, Telugu, Hindi and Kannada languages. The most important film in her career was the Kalyana Parisu in which she paired with her husband K. A. Thangavelu.

== Personal life ==
On the 100th day celebrations of Kalyana Parisu, Saroja and Thangavelu got married in Madurai Murugan Temple. They have a daughter Sumathi. Thangavelu died in 1994.

== Death ==
On 2 April 2012, she died due to cardiac arrest at her home in T. Nagar, Chennai. She was 79 years old.

== Awards ==
The Tamil Nadu Government felicitated her with Kalaimamani Award in appreciation. She also won the Tamil Nadu State Film Honorary Award - Sivaji Ganesan Award in 2002.

== Filmography (partial) ==
Year	Film	Role	Notes
1951	Sarvadhikari	Karpagam	Debut movie
1953	Gumastha	Pappi	
1953	Marumagal		
1954	Pudhu Yugam		
1955	Kaveri		
1957	Pathini Deivam		
1957	Aravalli		
1957	Karpukkarasi		
1958	Mangalya Bhagyam		
1958	Boologa Rambai		
1959	Kalyana Parisu		
1959	Nalla Theerpu		
1959	Vannakili		
1959	Engal Kuladevi		
1959	Manaiviye Manithanin Manickam		
1960	Maa Babu		Telugu
1960	Deivapiravi		
1960	Adutha Veetu Penn		
1960	Puthiya Pathai		
1961	Arasilankumari		
1961	Manapanthal		
1961	Thirudathe		
1961	Marutha Nattu Veeran		
1961	Thennilavu	Thangam	
1962	Paarthaal Pasi Theerum		
1963	Arivaali		
1968	Thillana Mohanambal		
1976	Idhaya Malar		
1980	Muyalukku Moonu Kaal		
1980	Thunaivi Thozhan		
1983	Oppandham		
