= Nenjil Or Aalayam =

1962 film by C. V. Sridhar

- Theatrical release poster
- Directed by: C. V. Sridhar
- Written by: C. V. Sridhar
- Produced by: C. V. Sridhar
- Starring: Kalyan Kumar; Devika; R. Muthuraman
- Cinematography: A. Vincent
- Edited by: N. M. Shankar
- Music by: Viswanathan–Ramamoorthy
- Production company: Chithralaya
- Release date: 26 January 1962
- Running time: 164 minutes
- Country: India
- Language: Tamil

Nenjil Or Aalayam (transl. A Temple in the Heart) is a 1962 Indian Tamil-language romantic drama film directed, produced and written by C. V. Sridhar. The film stars Kalyan Kumar, Devika and R. Muthuraman while Nagesh, Manorama and Kutty Padmini play supporting roles. The original soundtrack album and background score were composed by Viswanathan–Ramamoorthy, while the lyrics for the songs were written by Kannadasan.

The film revolves around a young woman named Seetha, her husband Venu, and Seetha's lover Murali. Due to Murali's tenure overseas, Seetha's parents force her to marry another person. A few years later, Venu contracts cancer and Seetha brings him to Chennai to see a cancer specialist who, to her dismay, turns out to be Murali. Realising that something is worrying Seetha, Venu gives her the freedom to marry Murali after his death. The remainder of the film shows how Murali sacrifices his love for the sake of the couple's happiness and cures Venu.

Nenjil Or Aalayam was released on 26 January 1962, coinciding with Republic Day in India. The film received positive critical feedback and went on to become a commercial success. The songs "Sonnathu Neethaana" and "Engirundhaalum Vaazhga" attained popularity among the Tamil diaspora. The film won the National Film Award for Best Feature Film in Tamil and the President's Award for Sridhar at the 10th National Film Awards.

The film became a trendsetter for both fast-paced filmmaking and triangular love stories with sacrifice as the theme. Sridhar remade the film in Hindi as Dil Ek Mandir (1963) and in Telugu as Manase Mandiram (1966). It was also remade in Malayalam as Hridayam Oru Kshethram (1976), and in Kannada as Kumkuma Rakshe (1977). The former was directed by P. Subramaniam while the latter was by S. K. A. Chari.

== Plot ==
Murali and Seetha are lovers. Murali goes abroad to pursue higher studies in medicine. During his tenure overseas, Seetha is forced by her parents to marry another person. Devastated upon hearing the news, Murali swears a vow of lifelong celibacy and devotes himself to save people suffering from cancer. A few years later, a man named Venu happens to be critically ill with cancer and has to be operated upon. The treatment for Venu progresses well until Murali meets Venu's wife, who is revealed to be Seetha. When Seetha learns that the doctor treating Venu is Murali, whom she had left, she becomes upset.

Though Murali does his best to cure Venu, Seetha is worried that Murali might take revenge on her by not providing proper treatment to Venu, who in the meantime, learns of Murali and Seetha's love. Venu requests Murali to marry Seetha in case the operation is unsuccessful as he does not wish for his wife to become a widow. Seetha becomes infuriated when she discovers Venu's request and tells Murali that if Venu dies, she will die as well. Murali promises Seetha that he will save Venu even if he has to risk his own life on the line.

Murali works hard to save Venu so as not to create a misconception that he killed Venu to be with Seetha. With great difficulty, Murali manages to cure Venu's cancer successfully. However, when Murali reads the results of the operation, he becomes so thrilled at its success that he unexpectedly dies of high blood pressure due to his over-excitement. Venu and Seetha realise that Murali had sacrificed his life for their happiness and remains in their hearts.

Woven into the story is a subplot following a girl, who is in the same hospital Murali works in and undergoes treatment for the same disease that Venu contracted. However, her fate is contrary.

== Cast ==
Lead actors

- Kalyan Kumar as Dr. Murali
- Devika as Seetha
- R. Muthuraman as Venu

Male supporting actors

- Nagesh as Peter
- V. S. Raghavan as Seetha's father

Female supporting actors

- Manorama as Navaneedham
- Kutty Padmini as the dying child
- Santha Kumari (guest appearance)
- Sivakami as Vanaja

== Production ==
=== Development ===
In the early 1960s, C. V. Sridhar founded the production company Chithralaya. When discussing with his associates what should be the company's first film, Sridhar came up with the story of Nenjil Or Aalayam; however, he later decided that the company's first film should not be a tragic one, and came up with the lighter Thennilavu (1961). After that film's success, Nenjil Or Aalayam was revived. Inspired by an American film starring Mickey Rooney which was entirely set in prison, Sridhar decided to do a film set in a hospital. Sridhar initially planned a different plot line for this film with Sivaji Ganesan as an old age character suffering from terminal disease, but since Sridhar was dissatisfied with this plot, he came up with a new plot.

=== Casting ===
Sridhar strictly wanted newcomers/less prominent artistes to star. Kalyan Kumar, though popular in Kannada cinema, was a relative "stranger" to Tamil cinema, and was cast as the main character Murali. Sridhar was impressed with R. Muthuraman's performance in a play, and subsequently selected him for the role of Venu. (Note: Muthuraman stated the play was Vadivel Vathiyar, but Sridhar claimed it was Policekaran Magal.) Sridhar initially wanted C. R. Vijayakumari to play Seetha and she agreed, but later approached Devika. She accepted as she liked the story.

Nagesh stayed with actor K. Balaji during his early days as an upcoming comedian for three years. Balaji introduced Nagesh to Sridhar, who offered him a role on Balaji's recommendation. Nagesh revealed that he was initially to play the role of a country bumpkin, but was chosen by Sridhar to play Peter, the hospital attendant. He was paid an advance of ₹501 (equivalent to ₹43,000 or US$440 in 2023). S. Rama Rao was originally supposed to play that role, but lost it due to arriving late on the first day of shoot. The screenplay and dialogues for Nagesh's portions were written by Chitralaya Gopu.

=== Filming ===
The song "Sonnathu Neethaana" was picturised on Seetha (Devika) playing the sitar, but the close-up shot of the fingers playing the sitar were actually those of Ahmed Hussain.

Principal photography took place entirely on a hospital set at Chennai's Vijaya Vauhini Studios. Ganga was the art director, N. M. Shankar was the editor, and A. Vincent was the cinematographer. For the first scene, Nagesh was told to jump from the steps when Sridhar warned him not to do but Nagesh assured he will pull it off. After jumping, he was surprised to see Sridhar missing from the sets and this scene was instead directed by his assistant P. Madhavan. Gopu then said he did this to make sure Nagesh should not feel scared to perform in front of Sridhar. The song "Sonnathu Neethaana" is picturised on Devika's character Seetha playing the sitar, but the close-up shot of the fingers playing the sitar were actually those of Ahmed Hussain.

Nenjil Or Aalayam was the first Tamil film to be shot entirely on a single set. Filming was completed in less than 30 days, although accounts vary on how many days were exactly taken to complete the shoot. While film historian Randor Guy and K. S. Sivakumaran of Daily News Sri Lanka state that the film was completed in four weeks, Ramya Kannan of The Hindu, and Tamil Canadian journalist D. B. S. Jeyaraj state the completion time to be 22 and 28 days respectively. According to Encyclopaedia of Indian Cinema by Ashish Rajadhyaksha and Paul Willemen, the film was shot in 15 days, while Bhama Devi Ravi of The Times of India states it was shot in two weeks. Malathi Rangarajan of The Hindu said the film was completed in 25 days. The final length of the film's prints were 14,810 metres (48,590 ft) long.

== Music ==
The original soundtrack album and background score for Nenjil Or Aalayam were composed by Viswanathan–Ramamoorthy (a duo consisting of M. S. Viswanathan and T. K. Ramamoorthy), while the lyrics were written by Kannadasan. All the seven songs were composed and completed within one day.

The inspiration for the opening line of the song "Engirundhalum Vaazhga" came to Kannadasan when he happened to hear the speech of C. N. Annadurai, the then Chief Minister of Tamil Nadu, on actor Sivaji Ganesan at a film function. When Annadurai heard of Ganesan joining the Indian National Congress, he wished the latter success by saying, "Sivaji ... nee engirundhalum vaazhga ..." (Sivaji, wherever you are, live long). The song "Muthana Muthallavo" was written by Kannadasan in 10 minutes at a railway station, and recorded in 20 minutes. "Sonnathu Neethaana" is based on the Jaunpuri raga. Once when Kannadasan was late to the studio for song recording, an upset Viswanathan rebuked him and said he would not ask Kannadasan for lyrics any more. When Kannadasan learned of this, he met Viswanathan and presented him with lyrics beginning with "Sonnathu Neethaana? Sol... Sol..." (transl. Did you say that? Say... Say...), which impressed Viswanathan. Lakshmi Palecanda, writing for the magazine Khabar, considered that the song reflects "accusation, sorrow, and disillusionment." Portions of the song "Ninaipadhellam" are based on the Keeravani raga.

The album received positive reviews from critics and contributed to the film's success. Film critic Baradwaj Rangan, writing for The New Indian Express, opined that "Engirundhaalum Vaazhga" had set "the precedent for several generations of jilted lovers". P. K. Ajith Kumar of The Hindu stated, "Just as [Susheela] does not need to know the language to sing a song perfectly, we need not know Tamil to enjoy her songs like ... Sonnathu neethanaa... (Nenjil [Or] Aalayam)". Rajadhyaksha and Willemen called "Engirundhaalum Vaazhga" "a classic number about unrequited love." Following Viswanathan's death in July 2015, the news agency Press Trust of India wrote that "Ninaipadhellam" was "memorable for the deep sense of solace it offered to wounded hearts." Anand Venkateswaran of The Wire noted, "MSV's style is less about making words sit in a meter than about a musical empathy with the meaning. Could anyone else have set to tune the first line of 'Sonnadhu nee daana', of Nenjil Or Alayam (Muthuraman, 1962)?" A critic from Dina Thanthi noted Kannadasan had an uncanny ability to deliver perfect situational songs and cited "Sonnathu Neethaana" as an example.

Track listing
No.	Title	Singer(s)	Length
1.	"Engirundhaalum Vaazhga"	A. L. Raghavan	3:16
2.	"Enna Ninaithu"	P. Susheela	3:30
3.	"Muthana Muthallavo"	P. Susheela	3:35
4.	"Ninaipadhellam"	P. B. Sreenivas	3:28
5.	"Oruvar Vaazhum Aalaiyam"	T. M. Soundararajan, L.R. Eshwari	3:18
6.	"Sonnathu Neethaana"	P. Susheela	3:35
Total length:			20:42

== Release ==
Nenjil Or Aalayam was released on 26 January 1962, coinciding with the Republic Day of India. It was previously scheduled for 29 December 1961. According to Sridhar, the response during the first week was average but it picked up in the second week; the film ultimately ran for 175 days in theatres. To celebrate the film's successful outing at the box office, the film's crew members created an advertisement thanking the people who came to watch the film and appreciated it; the advertisement was issued in Nadigar Sangam's official magazine, Nadigan Kural, on 9 February 1962. Encouraged by the film's success, Sridhar wished to screen the film at the Cannes Film Festival, thus the screenplay was translated into French in time for the festival. Sridhar sent Sarma, one of his administrative managers, to France to attend the screening of the film on his behalf.

=== Critical reception ===
Nenjil Or Aalayam received positive feedback from critics for its innovative storytelling. On 18 February 1962, the Tamil magazine Ananda Vikatan appreciated the film, mentioning it was an innovative film made like American films and a sincere attempt to improve the taste of filmgoers for quality films. On 8 April 1962, Link called the film "refreshingly different. What makes it better is, what it does not have", such as "star value", and involved or insipid dialogue. The reviewer praised the performances of Devika and Kalyan Kumar, and noted that though there were clichés, "the presentation is racy and superb." Kanthan of Kalki lauded the film for its making and the cast performances, praising Sridhar for casting less prominent actors in leading roles.

=== Accolades ===
Nenjil Or Aalayam won the National Film Award for Best Feature Film in Tamil and the President's Award for Sridhar at the 10th National Film Awards. Additionally, it won in two categories at the Film Fans' Association Awards: Best Film and Best Director (Sridhar).

== Remakes ==
Sridhar remade Nenjil Or Aalayam in Hindi as Dil Ek Mandir (1963) and in Telugu as Manase Mandiram (1966). It was also remade in Malayalam as Hridayam Oru Kshethram (1976) by P. Subramaniam, and in Kannada as Kumkuma Rakshe (1977) by S. K. A. Chari. California-based Indian filmmaker Jag Mundhra was keen on remaking Dil Ek Mandir in English and Hindi, effecting some marginal changes in the film treatment. Mundhra met Sridhar to ask for the rights to the film's script only to learn that Sridhar had assigned it to a film financier for a paltry sum, for eternity. The financier demanded an exorbitant fee for giving up the rights. The fee amounted to 75% of Mundhra's budget.

== Legacy ==
Whether Sridhar made a comedy or a tragedy, love was his basic theme. It may look clichéd now, that (as in Nenjil Or Aalayam) a woman's former lover would turn out to be the very doctor who has to operate on her husband. But at that time, it was totally off the beaten track. He has been an inspiration to all future filmmakers, including myself.

— Director K. Balachander on Sridhar.

Nenjil Or Aalayam attained cult status in Tamil cinema and became a trendsetter for fast-paced filmmaking and triangular love stories. The film became a major breakthrough in Nagesh's career, and the film critic S. Theodore Baskaran believed that his role as a ward boy "established his position" among Tamil cinema's prominent actors. In 2004, Baradwaj Rangan wrote "A Then Nilavu or a Nenjil Or Aalayam or a Kaadhalikka Neramillai, Sridhar films all, in those days was considered the work of a genius with form."

In July 2007, S. R. Ashok Kumar of The Hindu asked eight acclaimed directors were asked to list ten films they liked most. Directors Mahendran, Balu Mahendra and K. S. Ravikumar listed the film among their favourite films. Ravikumar was quoted saying, "Sridhar's Nenjil Or Aalayam depicts the supremacy of love." K. Hariharan, director of the L. V. Prasad Film and Television Academy in Chennai, noted in 2011, "The only film that could stake claim [in the 1960s] to an individual 'love story' was probably Sridhar's powerful Nenjil [Or] Aalayam! And even here 'sacrifice' takes the upper hand!" It was one of the films featured in artist Jeeva's book Thiraiseelai, a compilation of articles on cinema which won a Special Mention certificate award at the 58th National Film Awards.

== Bibliography ==
- Balabharathi (2012). தமிழ் சினிமா 80 பாகம்-1 [Tamil Cinema 80 Part-1] (in Tamil). Chennai: Nakkheeran Publications. ISBN 978-93-81828-40-3.
- Mahmood, Hameeduddin (1974). The kaleidoscope of Indian cinema. Affiliated East-West Press.
- Rajadhyaksha, Ashish; Willemen, Paul (1998) [1994]. Encyclopaedia of Indian Cinema. British Film Institute and Oxford University Press. ISBN 0-19-563579-5.
- Sundararaman (2007) [2005]. Raga Chintamani: A Guide to Carnatic Ragas Through Tamil Film Music (2nd ed.). Chennai: Pichhamal Chintamani. OCLC 295034757.
- Sundaresan, P. N. (1988). Sruti, Issues 41-52. University of California Press.
