= Pudhiya Pathai =

1960 film by Tapi Chanakya

- Poster
- Directed by: Tapi Chanakya
- Screenplay by: Murasoli Maran
- Story by: Mukhram Sharma
- Starring: Gemini Ganesan; Savithri; K. A. Thangavelu; K. Balaji
- Cinematography: Yoosuf Mulji
- Music by: Master Venu
- Production company: Sri Sarathi Studios
- Release date: 17 November 1960
- Country: India
- Language: Tamil

Pudhiya Pathai (transl. New Course) is a 1960 Indian Tamil-language film directed by Tapi Chanakya. The film stars Gemini Ganesan and Savithri. It is a remake of the Hindi film Ek Hi Raasta (1956). The film was simultaneously shot in Telugu as Kumkuma Rekha (1960).

== Cast ==
List adapted from the database of Film News Anandan.

Male cast

- Gemini Ganesan
- K. A. Thangavelu
- A. Karunanidhi
- K. Balaji
- Balakrishnan

Female cast

- Savithri
- M. Saroja
- Daisy Irani (as child artiste)
- Sukumari
- Jyothi

== Production ==
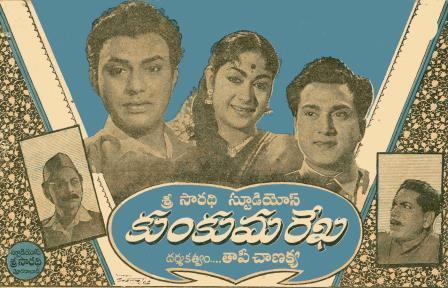
Poster of the Telugu version "Kumkuma Rekha"

The film was directed by Tapi Chanakya, the story was written by Mukhram Sharma and Murasoli Maran wrote the dialogues. Cinematography was handled by Yoosuf Mulji. Vembatti Sathyam was the choreographer.

== Soundtrack ==
Music was composed by Master Venu, while the lyrics were penned by A. Maruthakasi and Kannadasan. The song "Aasaigal Malarvadhu Paruva Nenjile" is based on the tune of "Sawle Salone Aaye Din Baharke" from the 1956 Hindi film Ek Hi Raasta.

Song	Singer/s	Lyricist	Length
"Innum Yaen Varavillai"	P. Susheela	A. Maruthakasi	02:17
"Aasaigal Malarvadhu Paruva Nenjile"	T. M. Soundararajan & Jikki	A. Maruthakasi	04:14
"Thanjaavoor Bommai Pole"	Jikki & group	A. Maruthakasi	04:18
"Muyandraal Pugazh Perave Mudiyaadhaa"	P. Susheela & Jayalakshmi Santhanan	A. Maruthakasi	03:01
"Vaanamenum Kooraiyin"	T. M. Soundararajan	Kannadasan	05:18
"Inba Kanavodu Kan Moodu"	P. Susheela	Kannadasan	
"Manamaalai Izhandha Thaaye"	T. M. Soundararajan	Kannadasan	02:48
"En Indha Iravu"	T. M. Soundararajan & Jikki		03:08
"Pongum Manamedai Alangaaram"	P. Susheela		03:09
"Neeyum Naanum Jodi"	T. M. Soundararajan & Jikki		02:23
