= Aswamedham (film) =

- Audio Cover
- Directed by: K. Raghavendra Rao
- Written by: Satyanand (story / dialogues)
- Screenplay by: Yandamuri Veerendranath
- Produced by: C. Aswini Dutt
- Starring: Nandamuri Balakrishna; Shobhan Babu; Meena; Nagma
- Cinematography: A. Vincent; Ajayan Vincent
- Edited by: Kotagiri Venkateswara Rao
- Music by: Ilaiyaraaja
- Production company: Vyjayanthi Movies
- Release date: 25 December 1992
- Running time: 148 minutes
- Country: India
- Language: Telugu

Aswamedham is a 1992 Indian Telugu-language action drama film directed by K. Raghavendra Rao. It stars Nandamuri Balakrishna, Sobhan Babu, Meena, Nagma and music composed by Ilaiyaraaja. It was produced by C. Aswani Dutt under the Vyjayanthi Movies banner. The film was commercially successful.

The film was dubbed into Hindi as Akhiri Intaqam and into Tamil as Dharma Bhoomi.

== Cast ==
- Nandamuri Balakrishna as Kireeti
- Sobhan Babu as Abhimanyu IPS
- Meena as Dr. Bharathi (Voice Dubbed by Roja Ramani)
- Nagma as Sowjanya (Voice Dubbed by Saritha)
- Amrish Puri as Anil Vyaghra & Sunil Vyaghra (Dual role)
- Kota Srinivasa Rao as Rayudu
- Allu Ramalingaiah as Tataji
- Brahmanandam as Sivanandam
- Babu Mohan as Kannayah
- Radha Ravi as Avinash
- Prasad Babu as Inspector Giri
- Geeta as Lakshmi

== Soundtrack ==
Ashwamedham

Soundtrack album by Ilaiyaraaja
- Released: 1992
- Recorded: 1992
- Genre: Soundtrack
- Length: 32:26
- Label: Surya Music
- Producer: Ilaiyaraaja

Ilaiyaraaja chronology
Chanti (1992)	Ashwamedham (1992)	Dharmakshetram (1992)

Music composed by Ilaiyaraaja. Lyrics written by Veturi. Music released on Surya Music Company.

No.	Title	Singer(s)	Length
1.	"Jhum Chaku Chaku"	S. Janaki, S. P. Balasubrahmanyam	5:21
2.	"O Prema"	Asha Bhosle, S. P. Balasubrahmanyam	5:43
3.	"Seethakalam Premaku"	Asha Bhosle, S. P. Balasubrahmanyam	5:05
4.	"Cheppana Unna Pani"	S. Janaki, S. P. Balasubrahmanyam	5:08
5.	"Guntalakidi Ghuma"	K. S. Chithra, S. P. Balasubrahmanyam	5:06
6.	"Em Debba Teesavura"	S. Janaki, S. P. Balasubrahmanyam	5:11
Total length:			32:26
