= A. Vincent =

Indian cinematographer and director

- Born: 14 June 1928; Calicut, Madras Presidency, British India
- Died: 25 February 2015 (aged 86); Chennai, Tamil Nadu, India
- Occupations: Cinematographer, Film Director
- Children: Jayanan Vincent; Ajayan Vincent

Aloysius Vincent (14 June 1928 – 25 February 2015) was an Indian cinematographer and director known for his works in Malayalam, Tamil, Telugu and Hindi language films. From the mid-1960s on, he directed some 30 movies including the landmark Malayalam films Bhargavi Nilayam, and Murappennu.

He received the Filmfare Best Cinematographer Award for Prem Nagar (1974) starring Rajesh Khanna. In 2003, the Indian Society of Cinematographers (ISC) awarded him an Honorary Membership, along with K. K. Mahajan and V. K. Murthy. He received the J. C. Daniel Award in 1996.

== Biography ==
Vincent was born in 1928 in Calicut, then part of Madras Presidency. He was trained under cinematographer Kamal Ghosh and was initially associated with Gemini Studios. He started his career in Tamil cinema and shot to fame with the Sivaji Ganesan-starrer Uthamaputhiran. Vincent teamed up with C. V. Sridhar in masterpieces such as Kalyana Parisu, Nenjil Or Aalayam, Kaadhalikka Neramillai, Sumaithaangi and Then Nilavu. He then became a freelancer and achieved success in Malayalam and Telugu films. He established himself as one of the leading cinematographers in South India and also earned a name in Hindi films. At a time when cinematography was in its infancy in Indian cinema, he experimented with camera angles and placements. He succeeded in bringing in the kind of visuals that were not seen before in South Indian films. In 2003, the Indian Society of Cinematographers (ISC) awarded him an Honorary Membership, along with K. K. Mahajan and V. K. Murthy.

Vincent has directed around 30 films, mostly in Malayalam. The first Malayalam film he directed, Bhargavi Nilayam (1964), was scripted by renowned writer Vaikom Muhammad Basheer. It is considered one of the all time classics in Malayalam cinema and the soundtrack to this film was also a notable success. Few directors could claim such an impressive list of chart-toppers and some of the Malayalam feature films directed by Vincent are Murappennu, Nadhi, Gandharvakshethram, Thulabharam, Aswamedham, Achani, Anaavaranam, Aalmaram, Thriveni, Nagarame Nandi, Abhijathyam, Asuravithu, Kochu Themmadi, Nizhalattam, Chenda, Sreekrishna Parunthu, Priyamulla Sophia, Nakhangal and Theerthayathra. Vincent died on 25 February 2015 at the age of 86. His sons Jayanan Vincent and Ajayan Vincent are also cinematographers

== Filmography ==
=== As cinematographer ===
- Chandirani (1953) Telugu (Guest Cinematographer)
- Neelakuyil (1954) Malayalam (Cinematographer. Debut as independent cinematographer.)
- Amaradeepam (1956) Tamil (Cinematographer)
- Sontha Ooru (1956) Telugu (Cinematographer)
- Yaar Paiyyan (1957) Tamil (Cinematographer)
- Amar Deep (1958) Hindi (Cinematographer)
- Uthamaputhiran (1958) Tamil (Cinematographer)
- Kalyana Parisu (1959) Tamil (Cinematographer)
- Illarikam (1959) Telugu (Cinematographer)
- Pelli Kanuka (1960 film) (1960) Telugu (Cinematographer)
- Vidivelli (1960) Tamil (Cinematographer)
- Ellorum Innattu Mannar (1960) Tamil (Cinematographer)
- Meenda Sorgam (1960) Tamil (Cinematographer)
- Mudiyanaya Puthran (1961) Malayalam (Cinematographer)
- Nenjil Or Aalayam (1961) Tamil (Cinematographer)
- Nazrana (1961) Hindi (Cinematographer)
- Then Nilavu (1961) Tamil (Cinematographer)
- Punar Jenmam (1961) Tamil (Cinematographer)
- Kula Gotralu (1962) Telugu (Cinematographer)
- Policekaran Magal (1962) Tamil (Cinematographer)
- Sumaithaangi (1962) Tamil (Cinematographer)
- Nenjam Marappathillai (1963) Tamil (Cinematographer)
- Dil Ek Mandir (1963) Hindi (Cinematographer)
- Moodupadam (1963) Malayalam (Cinematographer)
- Kadhalikka Neramillai (1964) Tamil (Cinematographer) Eastman Color
- Thacholi Othenan (film) (1964) Malayalam (Director of Photography)
- Rajamalli (1965) Malayalam (Cinematographer)
- Enga Veettu Pillai (1965) Tamil (Cinematographer) Eastman Color
- Kunjali Marakkar (1966) Malayalam (Guest Cinematographer)
- Letha Manasulu (1966) Telugu (Cinematographer)
- Bhaktha Prahalada(1967) Telugu (Cinematographer) Eastman Color
- Mehrban (1967) Hindi (Cinematographer)
- Thunaivan (1969) Tamil (Special Effects Cinematographer)
- Adimai Penn (1969) Tamil (Guest Cinematographer)
- Madhavi (1969 film) (1969) Hindi (Cinematographer)
- Gauravam (1973 film) (1973) Tamil (Cinematographer)
- Ek Nari Ek Brahmachari(1971) Hindi (Cinematographer)
- Iru Thuruvam (1971) Tamil (Cinematographer)
- Savaale Samali (1971) Tamil (Cinematographer)
- Vasantha Maligai (1973) Tamil (Cinematographer)
- Prem Nagar (1974) Hindi (Cinematographer)
- Akkaraipachai (1974) Tamil (Cinematographer)
- Avan Oru Sarithiram (1975) Tamil (Cinematographer)
- Babu (1975) Telugu (Cinematographer)
- Soggadu (1975) Telugu (Cinematographer)
- Rojavin Raja (1976) Tamil (Cinematographer)
- Jyothi (1976) Telugu (Cinematographer)
- Secretary (1976) Telugu (Cinematographer)
- Adavi Ramudu (1977) Telugu (Cinematographer)
- Prema Lekhalu (1977) Telugu (Cinematographer)
- Gadusu Pillodu (1977) Telugu (Cinematographer)
- Radhakrishna (1978) Telugu (Cinematographer)
- Vayanadan Thampan (1978) Malayalam (Director)
- Rajaputhra Rahasyamu (1978) Telugu (Cinematographer)
- K D No. 1 (1978) Telugu (Cinematographer)
- Aana Paachan (1978) Malayalam (Director)
- Ilamai Kolam (1979) Tamil (Cinematographer)
- Guru (1980) Tamil / Telugu (Guest Director / Cinematographer)
- Ashajyothi (1981) Telugu (Cinematographer)
- Bandish (1981) Hindi (Cinematographer)
- Mahaan (1983) Hindi (Cinematographer)
- Aanandha Kummi (1983) Tamil (Cinematographer)
- Douthyam (1988) Malayalam (Special Effects Cinematographer)
- Nari Nari Naduma Murari (1990) Telugu (Cinematographer)
- Alludugaru (1990) Telugu (Guest Cinematographer)
- Gnana Paravai (1991) Tamil (Cinematographer)
- Uncle Bun (1991) Malayalam (Special Effects Cinematographer)
- Gharana Mogudu (1992) Telugu (Cinematographer)
- Dharma Kshetram (1992) Telugu (Cinematographer)
- Aapathbandhavudu (1992) Telugu (Cinematographer)
- Aswamedham (1992) Telugu (Cinematographer)
- Allari Priyudu (1993) Telugu (Cinematographer)
- Major Chandrakanth (1993) Telugu (Cinematographer)
- Bobbili Simham (1994) Telugu (Cinematographer)
- Sahasa Veerudu Sagara Kanya (1996) Telugu (Cinematographer)
- Annamayya (1997) Telugu (Cinematographer)
- Yamajathakudu (1999) Telugu (Cinematographer)

=== As director ===
- Kochu Themmadi (1986) Malayalam
- Pournami Raavil 3D (1985) Malayalam
- Sreekrishna Parunthu (1984) Malayalam
- Ponnum Poovum (1983) Malayalam
- Theeram Thedunna Thira (1983) Malayalam
- Aana Paachan (1978) Malayalam
- Naam Pirandha Mann (1977) Tamil
- Anaavaranam (1976) Malayalam
- Priyamulla Sophia (1975) Malayalam
- Thirumangalyam (1974) Tamil
- Achani (1973) Malayalam
- Chenda (film) (1973) Malayalam
- Dharmayudham (1973) Malayalam
- Nakhangal (1973) Malayalam
- Gandharava Kshetram (1972) Malayalam
- Theertha Yathra (1972) Malayalam
- Aabhijathyam (1971) Malayalam
- Iru Veedugal (1970) Tamil
- Nizhalattam (1970) Malayalam
- Thriveni (1970) Malayalam Eastman Color
- Thulabharam (1969) Malayalam
- Aalmaram (1969) Malayalam
- Nadi (1969) Malayalam Eastman Color
- Asuravithu (1968) Malayalam
- Thulabharam (1968) Malayalam
- Ashwamedham (1967) Malayalam
- Engalukkum Kalam Varum (1967) Tamil
- Nagarame Nandi (1967) Malayalam
- Murappennu (1965) Malayalam
- Bhargavi Nilayam (1964) Malayalam

== Awards ==
Nandi Awards

- Best Cinematographer - Adavi Ramudu (1977)
- Best Cinematographer - Annamayya

13th Prem Nazir Award
