= Pelli Kanuka (1960 film) =

1960 film by C. V. Sridhar

- Theatrical release poster
- Directed by: C. V. Sridhar
- Written by: Acharya Aatreya (dialogues)
- Screenplay by: C. V. Sridhar
- Based on: Kalyana Parisu by C. V. Sridhar
- Produced by: S. Krishna Murthy; T. Govindarajan; Sridhar
- Starring: Akkineni Nageswara Rao; Krishna Kumari; B. Saroja Devi
- Cinematography: A. Vincent
- Edited by: N. M. Shankar
- Music by: A. M. Rajah
- Production company: Venus Pictures
- Distributed by: Navayuga Films
- Release date: 22 April 1960
- Running time: 185 minutes
- Country: India
- Language: Telugu

Pelli Kanuka (transl. Wedding Gift) is a 1960 Indian Telugu-language romantic drama film, produced by and directed by C. V. Sridhar. It stars Akkineni Nageswara Rao, Krishna Kumari and B. Saroja Devi, with music composed by A. M. Rajah. The film is a remake of Sridhar's own Tamil film Kalyana Parisu (1959). It was released on 29 April 1960, and became a commercial success.

== Cast ==
- Akkineni Nageswara Rao as Bhaskar
- Krishna Kumari as Geeta
- B. Saroja Devi as Vasanti
- Jaggayya as Raghu
- Gummadi as Raghu's father
- Relangi as Satyam
- Girija as Kantham
- K. Malathi as Geeta's mother
- Master Babu as Raja

== Production ==
Pelli Kanuka is a remake of C. V. Sridhar's own Tamil film Kalyana Parisu (1959). Akkineni Nageswara Rao, who appeared in a supporting role in that film, portrayed the lead role in this film, while B. Saroja Devi reprised her role.

== Soundtrack ==
The soundtrack was composed by A. M. Rajah.

Song title	Lyrics	Singers	length
"Aade Paade Pasivada"	Samudrala Sr	P. Susheela	3:20
"Kannulato Palakarinchu"	Acharya Aatreya	A. M. Rajah, P. Susheela	3:38
"Pulakinchani Madi"	Arudra	Jikki	4:22
"Akkayyaku Seemantham"	Arudra	P. Susheela, S. Janaki	4:51
"Aade Paade Pasivada" (Pathos)	Samudrala Sr	A. M. Rajah	4:01
"Teerenuga Netitone"	Samudrala Sr	A. M. Rajah, P. Susheela	3:26
"Vaaduka Marchedavela"	Acharya Aatreya	A. M. Rajah, P. Susheela	4:28

== Release ==
Pelli Kanuka was released on 29 April 1960, and became a commercial success.
