= Urimaikural =

- Theatrical release poster
- Directed by: C. V. Sridhar
- Written by: C. V. Sridhar
- Produced by: Y. Kannaiah
- Starring: M. G. Ramachandran; Latha; Anjali Devi; V. S. Raghavan
- Cinematography: N. Balakrishnan
- Edited by: N. M. Shankar
- Music by: M. S. Viswanathan
- Production company: Chitralaya
- Release date: 7 November 1974
- Country: India
- Language: Tamil

Urimaikural (transl. Voice for Rights) is a 1974 Indian Tamil-language action drama film, written and directed by C. V. Sridhar. The film stars M. G. Ramachandran, Latha, Anjali Devi and V. S. Raghavan. It was released on 7 November 1974, and became a silver jubilee hit.

== Plot ==
Gopinath and his elder brother Sundaram Pillai are very close: they live under the same roof, and are very respected farmers. Gopinath is unconcerned for his future and has fun while also working hard on their farm. He has a love interest named Radha, but she is also the interest of Duraisamy. He wants to get rid of Gopinath's rivalry for Radha, so that he can marry her. He arranges events leading to Radha's engagement to Gopinath, and he also loans money to Sundaram, making him promise that Gopinath won't interfere in their marriage, which Gopinath agrees to.

However, Radha and Gopinath meet one last time, and they are caught by Duraisamy and Sundaram. One thing leads to another and Gopinath and Radha get married, are excommunicated by Sundaram from their family. Duraisamy now wants revenge and he arranges to make it look like Sundaram has swindled money belonging to the village. They give him a year to return the money failing which all his property would be confiscated. At this juncture, Gopinath works hard, fights off Duraisamy's henchmen and returns the money while also exposing him as the original thief.

== Cast ==
- M. G. Ramachandran as Gopinath "Gopi"
- Latha as Radha
- Anjali Devi as Parvathi
- M. N. Nambiar as Duraisamy
- S. V. Sahasranamam as Sundaram Pillai
- V. K. Ramasamy as Kozhaidhar Pulai
- C. K. Saraswathi
- V. S. Raghavan as Sabapathy
- Nagesh as Sadhasivam
- Thengai Srinivasan as Paramasivam
- Pushpalatha as Muthamma
- Sachu as Sachu/Sarasa
- Typist Gopu as Bai
- Samikannu as Villager
- Karikol Raju
- Usilai Mani
- Gemini Mali as Iyer

== Production ==
M. G. Ramachandran and Sridhar earlier were supposed to work in a film called Andru Sindhiya Ratham which got shelved. According to Sridhar, the reason for Ramachandran backing out may have been that, since Sridhar launched both Kadhalikka Neramillai (1964) and Andru Sindhiya Ratham at the same time, he promoted Kadhalikka Neramillai as the first contemporary colour film in Tamil but did not do the same for Andru Sindhiya Ratham, which may have made Ramachandran upset, causing him to leave. Sridhar, who was reeling under financial problems due to failure of his previous film Alaigal and also his other film Vaira Nenjam was getting delayed due to call sheet issues of Sivaji Ganesan, as per the advice of his friend, the Hindi actor Rajendra Kumar, decided to collaborate with Ramachandran who agreed to act under his direction.

Sridhar revealed that Urimai Kural was inspired from the Telugu film Dasara Bullodu (1971); he took only the basic plot from that film and made changes for Tamil version. When Gopu saw the film he suggested Sridhar to do this film with Ganesan however Gopu was shocked when Sridhar said he would make this film with Ramachandran. Gopu who received opportunities as director after the success of his debut directorial Kasethan Kadavulada (1972) wanted to concentrate on directing films, which led both of them to part ways professionally but still remained friends. The cinematography for the film was handled by N. Balakrishnan; however the climax portions were shot by Thambu as Balakrishnan had to shoot the climax for another film. The film was predominantly shot at a village Mugalivakkam near the garden belonging to Ramachandran while the climax portions were shot at land belonging to actor-producer K. Balaji and the songs were shot at Mysore.

== Soundtrack ==
The music was composed by M. S. Viswanathan. The song "Vizhiye Kadhai Ezhudhu" is set to Kambhoji raga. The song was added by Sridhar when political issues led to a widening rift between Ramachandran and Kannadasan. But Sridhar could not get a satisfactory response to the situation. So Sridhar and Viswanathan decided to convince Ramachandran to have Kannadasan's song, and Ramachandran accepted the proposal as he bore no personal grudge against the lyricist.

Track listing
No.	Title	Lyrics	Singer(s)	Length
1.	"Aambalaingalaa Neenga"	Vaali	L. R. Eswari	4:03
2.	"Kalyaana Valaiyosai kondu"	Vaali	T. M. Soundararajan, P. Susheela	4:33
3.	"Maattikkittaaradi Mayilakkaala"	Vaali	L. R. Eswari	4:59
4.	"Nethu Poothaaley"	Vaali	T. M. Soundararajan	5:16
5.	"Oru Thaai Vayittril"	Vaali	T. M. Soundararajan	4:45
6.	"Ponnaa Porandhaa"	Vaali	T. M. Soundararajan	4:32
7.	"Vizhiyea Kathai Ezhudhu"	Kannadasan	K. J. Yesudas, P. Susheela	5:38
Total length:				33:46

== Release and reception ==
Ananda Vikatan favourably reviewed the film, particularly the climax for its pace. The film became a silver jubilee hit.
