= C. V. Sridhar =

Indian screenwriter and film director (1933–2008)

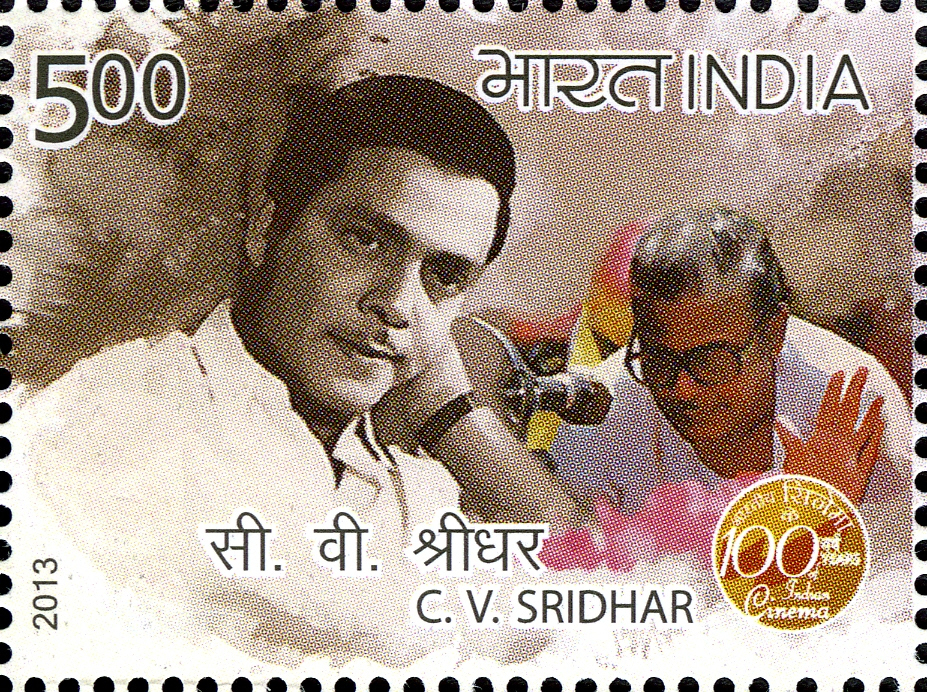
- Sridhar on a 2013 stamp of India
- Born: Chithamur Vijayaragavalu Sridhar; 22 July 1933; Chithamur, Chingleput District, Madras Presidency, British India (now Chengalpattu district, Tamil Nadu, India)
- Died: 20 October 2008 (aged 75); Chennai, Tamil Nadu, India
- Occupations: Film director; producer; screenwriter
- Years active: 1959–1991
- Spouse: Devasena
- Children: 2

Chithamur Vijayaraghavalu Sridhar (22 July 1933 – 20 October 2008) was an Indian screenwriter and film director. He directed nearly 60 films in Tamil, Hindi and Telugu languages.

== Career ==
=== Entry ===
In 1951, 18-year-old Sridhar went to AVM Productions with his story Latchiyavathi but P. Neelakantan rejected his story. Avvai T. K. Shanmugam was very much impressed by the story and Sridhar wrote the screenplay and dialogues for the drama. It was staged as Raththa Paasam and was one of the most successful dramas staged by TKS brothers. Sridhar was proudly taken to the stage and introduced to the audience as the writer. It was later produced jointly by TKS and Jupiter pictures under Jupiter – Avvai Productions where Jupiter pictures recommended some other writer to write the dialogues for the film. It was T. K. Shanmugam who was staunch that Sridhar should write the screenplay and dialogues. Sridhar made his entry into films as a screenwriter in Ratha Paasam. Later AVM Productions produced it in Hindi as Bhaai Bhaai in 1956 starring Ashok Kumar and Kishore Kumar but direction was by R. S. Mani. The film Bhai Bhai gave a big commercial break for the music director Madan Mohan and the writer Sridhar himself.

Sridhar wrote story and dialogues for Edhir Paradhathu. Sridhar wrote the dialogues in Tamil for the Telugu movie Parivartana and the movie was dubbed in 1955 as Latchadhipathi. Sridhar continued on writing for films like Maaman Magal, Maheswari, Amara Deepam, Maadharkula Manikkam, Engal Veetu Mahalakshmi, Yaar Paiyan, Manjal Mahimai, Uthama Puthiran and Punar Jenmam.

While working in Modern Theatres as writer for the film Maheswari, Sridhar had an opportunity to improve his knowledge and skills about film production. T. R. Sundaram had a many international books about films and directors, about film production, critical and technical essays. Sridhar always looked up to director V. Shantaram.

=== Venus Pictures ===
In 1956, Sridhar turned producer along with associates Krishnamoorthi, Govindarajan and Sundararajan in Venus Pictures where he scripted Amara Deepam and followed by Uthama Puthiran. Both films had Sivaji Ganesan and Padmini as the main roles. He made his debut as a director with Kalyana Parisu. This movie ran for more than 25 weeks, and is revered to this day as a milestone in the history of Tamil cinema. After this, he had a huge fan following and his name was talked about among the middle class movie going audience.

=== Chitralaya ===
He started his own production company Chitralaya (the emblem was designed by Art director Ganga) in 1961 with his friends Gopu, V. Nagabushanam, A. Vincent, P. N. Sundaram and Tiruchi Arunachalam made Then Nilavu. The latter which had Gemini Ganesan and Vyjayanthimala in the lead was the first Tamil film to be shot in Jammu and Kashmir. He made a series of commercially successful films like Nenjil Or Aalayam, Kaadhalikka Neramillai, Vennira Adai and many more.

== Film-making style ==
Sridhar was known as Nava-rasa-director, as he made films in a variety of styles, from the comedy Kaadhalikka Neramillai to the serious Kalai-kovil and Nenjil Or Aalayam. The latter was remade in Hindi with Rajendra Kumar and Meena Kumari as Dil Ek Mandir which earn him two nomination at Filmfare Awards, Best Director and Best Story categories. He brought out the best in comedians T. R. Ramachandran, K. A. Thangavelu, and Nagesh, and helped introduce Murthy and Nirmala to a wider audience in Vennira Aadai. Moorthy, Nirmala, now a TV and movie comedian, is still referred to as Vennira Aadai Moorthy after the fame he received from his performance in the movie. Even the actresses Jayalalitha and Nirmala used to be referred to as Vennira AadaiJayalalitha and Vennira Aadai Nirmala

Sridhar's Kaadhalikka Neramillai was one of the greatest blockbusters of Tamil film history. It was later remade in Hindi with actor Kishore Kumar and Shashi Kapoor by himself. Sridhar helped launch the career of many celebrities in Tamil cinema, namely, Saroja Devi in Kalyaana Parisu, R. Muthuraman and Devika in Nenjil Or Aalayam, Srikanth, J. Jayalalithaa, Vennira Aadai Nirmala and Vennira Aadai Moorthy in Vennira Adai (White Dress), Ravichandran, Kanchana and Rajasree in Kaadhalikka Neramillai, Kamal and Rajini in Ilamai Oonjal Aadigirathu, Karthik and Gigi in Ninaivellaam Nithya, Jayashree in Thendralae Ennai Thodu and Vikram in Thanthu Vitten Ennai.

His Bollywood films include Nazrana (1961), Dil Ek Mandir (1963), Pyar Kiye Jaa (1966) and Gehri Chaal (1973). Nazrana, starring by Raj Kapoor, Vyjayanthimala, Usha Kiran and Gemini Ganesan in guest appearance, earned him Filmfare Award for Best Story.The landmark film Nai Roshni directed by him in Hindi had Ashok Kumar, P. Bhanumati, Mala Sinha, Biwajeet and Raajkumar in lead roles and became the 7th highest-grossing film of the year 1967 in Hindi. Subsequently, this film was remade in Tamil as Poovum Pottum directed by Dada Mirasi.

Sridhar's films with Sivaji Ganesan include Ooty Varai Uravu, Nenjirukkum Varai, Sivantha Mann. Sivanthaman was the first color movie in Tamil shot at foreign locations. Dharti, the Hindi version was released in 1970 with Rajendra Kumar, Waheeda Rehman and Sivaji Ganesan in lead roles.

When in 1973, he went through sudden financial problems, at the insistence of Rajendra Kumar he approached M. G. Ramachandran, who suggested that a film be made and using that his financial woes would get resolved. Sridhar then made Urimai Kural which was a commercial success in 1974 and went on to direct M.G.R again in Meenava Nanban that was released in 1977.

In 1978, he brought together Kamal Hasan, Rajnikanth, Sripriya for romantic film Illamai Oonjal Aadugirathu. Then he remade the same in 1982 in Hindi as Dil-E-Nadan starring Rajesh Khanna, Shatrughan Sinha and Jaya Prada in lead roles. Both versions were successful.

In all his films he used a combination of stars, melodrama and melodious songs. He has directed films in Tamil, Hindi and Telugu. Sridhar was considered an expert in song picturisation as he could transform any song into sheer poetry. The formidable Sridhar – Kannadasan – M. S. Viswanathan combination held a magic spell on the audience and the songs contributed to the tremendous success of those films. Later on he switched to the Maestro Ilayaraaja for music and all his films with Ilayaraaja's music were known for their songs.

== Death ==
Sridhar died of Cardiac arrest in Chennai on 20 October 2008, aged 75.

== Filmography ==
Year	Film	Credited as				Language	Notes
Year	Film	Director	Producer	Story	Screenplay/ Dialogues	Language	Notes
1954	Ratha Paasam	✗	✗	✓	✓	Tamil	
1954	Ethir Paradhathu	✗	✗	✓	✓	Tamil	
1955	Maheswari			✓	✓	Tamil	
1955	Latchadhipathi	✗	✗	✗	✓	Tamil	Telugu dubbing of Parivartana
1955	Maaman Magal				✓	Tamil	
1956	Amara Deepam	✗	✓	✓	✓	Tamil	
1956	Bhai-Bhai			✓		Hindi	
1956	Mathar Kula Manickam				✓	Tamil	
1957	Enga Veettu Mahalakshmi				✓	Tamil	
1957	Yaar Paiyyan				✓	Tamil	
1958	Uthama Puthiran	✗	✓	✓	✓	Tamil	
1959	Manjal Mahimai				✓	Tamil	
1959	Kalyana Parisu	✓	✓	✓	✓	Tamil	Certificate of Merit for Best Feature Film in Tamil
1960	Pelli Kanuka	✓		✓		Telugu	
1960	Meenda Sorgam	✓		✓	✓	Tamil	
1960	Vidivelli	✓	✗	✓	✓	Tamil	
1961	Velugu Needalu	✗	✗	✗	✓	Telugu	
1961	Nazrana	✓	✗	✓		Hindi	Filmfare Award for Best Story
1961	Punar Jenmam	✗	✗	✗	✓	Tamil	
1961	Then Nilavu	✓	✓	✓	✓	Tamil	
1962	Nenjil Or Aalayam	✓	✓	✓	✓	Tamil	President's Silver Medal for Best Feature Film in Tamil
1962	Policekaran Magal	✓				Tamil	
1962	Sumaithaangi	✓	✗	✓	✓	Tamil	
1963	Chittor Rani Padmini			✓	✓	Tamil	
1963	Dil Ek Mandir	✓	✗	✓	✗	Hindi	Nominated: Filmfare Award for Best Director; Nominated: Filmfare Award for Best Story
1963	Nenjam Marappathillai	✓	✗	✗	✓	Tamil	
1964	Kaadhalikka Neramillai	✓	✓	✓	✓	Tamil	
1964	Kalai Kovil	✓	✗	✓	✓	Tamil	
1965	Venniradai	✓	✓	✓	✓	Tamil	
1966	Kodimalar	✓	✗	✓	✓	Tamil	
1966	Manase Mandiram	✓		✓	✓	Telugu	
1966	Pyar Kiye Jaa	✓		✓	✓	Hindi	
1967	Nenjirukkum Varai	✓	✓	✓	✗	Tamil	
1967	Nai Roshni	✓				Hindi	
1967	Ooty Varai Uravu	✓	✗	✓	✓	Tamil	
1968	Saathi	✓	✗	✓	✗	Hindi	
1968	Galatta Kalyanam	✓				Tamil	
1969	Sivantha Mann	✓	✓	✓	✓	Tamil	
1970	Dharti	✓		✓	✓	Hindi	
1971	Uttharavindri Ulle Vaa	✗	✓	✗	✗	Tamil	
1971	Avalukendru Or Manam	✓	✓	✓	✓	Tamil	
1971	Duniya Kya Jane	✓				Hindi	
1973	Alaigal	✓	✓	✓	✓	Tamil	25th Film
1973	Gehri Chaal	✓	✓			Hindi	
1974	Urimai Kural	✓	✗	✓	✓	Tamil	First movie with MGR
1975	Vaira Nenjam	✓	✓	✓	✓	Tamil	
1975	Ninagai Nanu	✓				Kannada	
1975	Lakshmi Nirdoshi	✓				Telugu	Telugu dubbing of Alaigal (1973)
1975	Jagruthi	✓				Kannada	
1976	Oh Manju	✓				Tamil	
1977	Seeta Geeta Datithe	✓				Telugu	
1977	Anna Nee En Deivam	✓	✗	✓	✓	Tamil	
1977	Meenava Nanban	✓	✗	✓	✓	Tamil	Second movie with MGR.
1978	Ilamai Oonjalaadugirathu	✓	✗	✓	✓	Tamil	
1978	Vayasu Pilichindi	✓	✗	✓	✓	Telugu	
1979	Azhage Unnai Aarathikkiren / Urvasi Neene Nanna Preyasi / Urvasi Neeve Naa Preyasi	✓	✗	✓	✓	Tamil / Kannada / Telugu	
1980	Soundaryame Varuga Varuga	✓		✓	✓	Tamil	
1981	Mohana Punnagai	✓	✗	✓	✓	Tamil	
1982	Ninaivellam Nithya	✓	✗	✓	✓	Tamil	
1982	Dil-E-Nadaan	✓	✗	✓	✓	Hindi	
1983	Thudikkum Karangal	✓	✗	✓	✓	Tamil	
1983	Oru Odai Nadhiyagirathu	✓	✓	✓	✓	Tamil	
1984	Alaya Deepam	✓	✗	✓	✓	Tamil	
1985	Unnai Thedi Varuven	✓		✓	✓	Tamil	
1985	Thendrale Ennai Thodu	✓		✓	✓	Tamil	
1985	Alaya Deepam	✓	✗	✓	✓	Tamil	Telugu
1986	Yaaro Ezhuthiya Kavithai	✓	✗	✓	✓	Tamil	
1986	Naanum Oru Thozhilali	✓	✓	✓	✓	Tamil	
1986	Kulirkaala Megangal	✓	✗	✓	✓	Tamil	
1987	Iniya Uravu Poothathu	✓	✗	✓	✓	50th Film	
1988	Premayanam	✓				Telugu	
1991	Thanthu Vitten Ennai	✓	✓	✓	✓	Tamil	

== Awards ==
Won

- 1959: Certificate of Merit for Best Feature Film in Tamil – Kalyana Parisu
- 1962: President's Silver Medal for Best Feature Film in Tamil – Nenjil Or Aalayam
- Kalaimamani Award from State Sangeeth Natak Academy.
- Filmfare Award for Best Story for Nazrana (1961).
- Tamil Nadu State Film Honorary Award – Arignar Anna Award in 1997

Nominated

- Filmfare Award for Best Director for Dil Ek Mandir (1963)
- Filmfare Award for Best Story for Dil Ek Mandir (1963)
- Filmfare Award for Best Director - Tamil for Urimai Kural (1975)
- Filmfare Award for Best Director - Tamil for Ilamai Oonjal Aadukirathu (1979)
- Filmfare Award for Best Director - Tamil for Oru Odai Nadhiyagirathu (1984)
