= List of songs written by Kannadasan =

The list contains songs written by Indian poet and songwriter Kannadasan. He won a National Film Award for Best Lyrics which is the first lyricist receive the award. His association with Viswanathan–Ramamoorthy is notable.

== Awards ==
Year	Film	Category	Outcome	Ref
1968	Kuzhandhaikkaga	National Film Award for Best Lyrics	Won	
1968	Lakshmi Kalyanam	Tamil Nadu State Film Award for Best Lyricist	Won	

== List of songs ==
=== 1940s ===
Year	Movie	Songs	Music director	Note(s)	Ref(s)
1949	Kanniyin Kaadhali	Kalangathiru Maname	S. M. Subbaiah Naidu	Debut film	
1949	Kanniyin Kaadhali	Puvy Raja	S. M. Subbaiah Naidu		
1949	Kanniyin Kaadhali	Karanam Theriyamal	S. M. Subbaiah Naidu		
1949	Kanniyin Kaadhali	Kandaen Ayya	S. M. Subbaiah Naidu		
1949	Kanniyin Kaadhali	Chithirai Paravaiyamma	S. M. Subbaiah Naidu		

=== 1950s ===
Year	Movie	Songs	Music director	Note	Ref(s)
1952	Panam	Engae Theduvaen Engae Theduven	Viswanathan–Ramamoorthy		
1952	Panam	Kudumbatthin Vilakku	Viswanathan–Ramamoorthy		
1952	Panam	Theena Moona Kaana	Viswanathan–Ramamoorthy		
1952	Panam	Idhayatthai Irumbakki...Manamudaiyorai Manidhargal Ennum	Viswanathan–Ramamoorthy		
1952	Panam	Aanukkor Needhi Pennukkor Needhi	Viswanathan–Ramamoorthy		
1952	Panam	En Vaazhvil Pudhu Paadama	Viswanathan–Ramamoorthy		
1952	Panam	Ezhai Nin Kovilai	Viswanathan–Ramamoorthy		
1952	Panam	Panathinaale Manusharoda	Viswanathan–Ramamoorthy		
1952	Panam	Ngoppanai Kette Mudippenn	Viswanathan–Ramamoorthy		
1952	Panam	Maanatthodu Vaazhvom	Viswanathan–Ramamoorthy		
1956	Tenali Raman	Chittu Pole Mullai Mottuppole	Viswanathan–Ramamoorthy		
1956	Tenali Raman	Aadum Kalaiyellam Paruva	Viswanathan–Ramamoorthy		
1956	Tenali Raman	Thennavan Thaai Nattu Singaarame	Viswanathan–Ramamoorthy		
1956	Tenali Raman	Thangam Pogum Meni	Viswanathan–Ramamoorthy		
1956	Tenali Raman	Putrile Pambirukkum....	Viswanathan–Ramamoorthy		
1956	Tenali Raman	Kangalil Adidum Penmaiyin	Viswanathan–Ramamoorthy		
1956	Tenali Raman	Kannamirandum Minnidum Annam	Viswanathan–Ramamoorthy		
1956	Tenali Raman	Pirandha Naal Mannan Pirandha Naal	Viswanathan–Ramamoorthy		
1956	Tenali Raman	Vinnulagil Minni Varum T	Viswanathan–Ramamoorthy		
1956	Tenali Raman	Adari Padarndha	Viswanathan–Ramamoorthy		
1956	Tenali Raman	Kannaa Pinnaa Mannaa	Viswanathan–Ramamoorthy		
1956	Tenali Raman	Vindhiyam Vadakkaaga Chandhiran	Viswanathan–Ramamoorthy		
1956	Tenali Raman	Chandhiran Pole	Viswanathan–Ramamoorthy		
1956	Tenali Raman	Drru Drru Ena Madugal	Viswanathan–Ramamoorthy		
1956	Tenali Raman	Thaadhi Thoodho Theedhu	Viswanathan–Ramamoorthy		
1956	Tenali Raman	Naattu Jananga Adaiyelam	Viswanathan–Ramamoorthy		
1957	Mahadhevi	Kanmoodum Velaiyilum	Viswanathan–Ramamoorthy		
1957	Mahadhevi	Singara Punnagai	Viswanathan–Ramamoorthy		
1957	Mahadhevi	Maanam Ondre Perithena	Viswanathan–Ramamoorthy		
1957	Mahadhevi	Sevai Seivadhe Aanandham	Viswanathan–Ramamoorthy		
1958	Anbu Engey	Ethanai Kodi Panam	Vedha		
1959	Sivagangai Seemai	Imaiyum Vizhiyum	Viswanathan–Ramamoorthy		
1959	Sivagangai Seemai	Veerargal Vaazhum Dravida Naattai	Viswanathan–Ramamoorthy		
1959	Sivagangai Seemai	Thendral Vandhu	Viswanathan–Ramamoorthy		
1959	Sivagangai Seemai	Kanavu Kanden Naan	Viswanathan–Ramamoorthy		
1959	Sivagangai Seemai	Maruvurirukkum Koonthal	Viswanathan–Ramamoorthy		
1959	Sivagangai Seemai	Thanimai Therndhatho	Viswanathan–Ramamoorthy		
1959	Sivagangai Seemai	Kottu Melam Kottungadi	Viswanathan–Ramamoorthy		
1959	Sivagangai Seemai	Sivagangai Cheemai	Viswanathan–Ramamoorthy		
1959	Sivagangai Seemai	Saanthu Pottu	Viswanathan–Ramamoorthy		
1959	Sivagangai Seemai	Kannankarutha Kili	Viswanathan–Ramamoorthy		
1959	Sivagangai Seemai	Kanavu Kanden Naan (Pathos)	Viswanathan–Ramamoorthy		
1959	Sivagangai Seemai	Vaigai Perugirava	Viswanathan–Ramamoorthy		
1959	Sivagangai Seemai	Chinna Chinna Chittu	Viswanathan–Ramamoorthy		
1959	Sivagangai Seemai	Muthu Pugazh Padaitthu	Viswanathan–Ramamoorthy		
1959	Sivagangai Seemai	Aalikkum Kaigal	Viswanathan–Ramamoorthy		
1959	Sivagangai Seemai	Vidiyum Vidiyum Endrirundhen	Viswanathan–Ramamoorthy		
1959	Bhaaga Pirivinai	Paalootri Uzhavu...Therodum Indha Seeraana	Viswanathan–Ramamoorthy		
1959	Bhaaga Pirivinai	Thangatthile Oru Kurai Irundhaalum	Viswanathan–Ramamoorthy		
1959	Bhaaga Pirivinai	Thalaiyaam Poo Mudichu	Viswanathan–Ramamoorthy		
1959	Bhaaga Pirivinai	En Piranthaai Magane	Viswanathan–Ramamoorthy		
1959	Thaai Magalukku Kattiya Thaali	"Thogai Inge Megam Ange"	T. R. Pappa		

=== 1960s ===
Year	Movie	Songs	Music director	Note	Ref(s)
1960	Kairasi	Kannum Kannum	R. Govardhanam		
1960	Kairasi	Kathirundhen Kathirundhen	R. Govardhanam		
1960	Kairasi	Kadhal Ennum Aatrinile	R. Govardhanam		
1960	Kairasi	Oorumillai Naattinile	R. Govardhanam		
1960	Kairasi	Sendattam Chinna Ponnu	R. Govardhanam		
1960	Kairasi	Paalilum Theanilum	R. Govardhanam		
1960	Kairasi	Anbulla Athan Vanakkam	R. Govardhanam		
1960	Kalathur Kannamma	Kangalin Vaarthaigal	R. Sudarsanam		
1960	Kalathur Kannamma	Sirithaalum	R. Sudarsanam		
1960	Kalathur Kannamma	Arugil Vandhaal	R. Sudarsanam		
1960	Kuravanji	Thanneeril Meen Irukkum	T. R. Papa		
1960	Kuravanji	Kadhal Kadal	T. R. Papa		
1960	Kuravanji	Paadi Azahippen Endru	T. R. Papa		
1960	Kuravanji	Alaiyitta Karumbakka	T. R. Papa		
1960	Mannathi Mannan	Kaniya Kaniya Mazhalai Pesum	Viswanathan–Ramamoorthy		
1960	Mannathi Mannan	Achcham Enbadhu Madamaiada	Viswanathan–Ramamoorthy		
1960	Mannathi Mannan	Avala Ivala Therndhu Edu	Viswanathan–Ramamoorthy		
1960	Mannathi Mannan	Kaaduthazhaikka.... Kanniyar Perumai	Viswanathan–Ramamoorthy		
1960	Mannathi Mannan	Kaaviri Thaaye Kaaviri Thaaye	Viswanathan–Ramamoorthy		
1960	Mannathi Mannan	Kadhar Kozhunan	Viswanathan–Ramamoorthy		
1960	Mannathi Mannan	Kalaiyodu Kalandhathu Unmai	Viswanathan–Ramamoorthy		
1960	Mannathi Mannan	Neeyo Naano Yaar Nilave	Viswanathan–Ramamoorthy		
1960	Mannathi Mannan	Paadupatta Thannale	Viswanathan–Ramamoorthy		
1960	Mannathi Mannan	Thandai Kondu	Viswanathan–Ramamoorthy		
1960	Veerakkanal	Kaigal Irandil	Viswanathan–Ramamoorthy		
1960	Veerakkanal	Sirithu Konde Irukka	Viswanathan–Ramamoorthy		
1960	Veerakkanal	Silaiyodu Vilaiyada	Viswanathan–Ramamoorthy		
1960	Veerakkanal	Poomudippathu Pottu	Viswanathan–Ramamoorthy		
1960	Veerakkanal	Chithiramae Chithiramae	Viswanathan–Ramamoorthy		
1960	Veerakkanal	Thangakiliye Mozhi	Viswanathan–Ramamoorthy		
1960	Veerakkanal	Thaali Pottukitta	Viswanathan–Ramamoorthy		
1961	Bhagyalakshmi	Kana Vandha Katchi	Viswanathan–Ramamoorthy		
1961	Bhagyalakshmi	Maalaipozhuthin Mayakkathile	Viswanathan–Ramamoorthy	Chandrakauns	
1961	Bhagyalakshmi	Kadhalennum Vadivam	Viswanathan–Ramamoorthy		
1961	Bhagyalakshmi	Kaadhalendral Aanum	Viswanathan–Ramamoorthy		
1961	Bhagyalakshmi	Singara Solaiye	Viswanathan–Ramamoorthy		
1961	Bhagyalakshmi	Kanne Raja Kavalai	Viswanathan–Ramamoorthy		
1961	Kumudham	Kallie Kalai Vannam	K. V. Mahadevan		.
1961	Kumudham	Nil Angey	K. V. Mahadevan		
1961	Kumudham	Kalyanam Aanavare Sowkiyama	K. V. Mahadevan		
1961	Paava Mannippu	Ellorum Kondaduvom	Viswanathan–Ramamoorthy		
1961	Paava Mannippu	Kaalangalil Aval Vasantham	Viswanathan–Ramamoorthy		
1961	Paava Mannippu	Paalirukkum Pazhamirukkum	Viswanathan–Ramamoorthy		
1961	Paava Mannippu	Vandha Naal Mudhal	Viswanathan–Ramamoorthy	Mohanam	
1961	Paava Mannippu	Sayavetti Thalaiyila	Viswanathan–Ramamoorthy		
1961	Paava Mannippu	Atthan Ennatthan	Viswanathan–Ramamoorthy		
1961	Paava Mannippu	Silar Sirippar Silar	Viswanathan–Ramamoorthy		
1961	Paava Mannippu	Vandha Naal Mudhal (pathos)	Viswanathan–Ramamoorthy		
1961	Manapanthal	Unakku Mattum Unakku	Viswanathan–Ramamoorthy		
1961	Manapanthal	Paarthu Paarthu Nindrathile	Viswanathan–Ramamoorthy		
1961	Manapanthal	Unakku Mattum (pathos)	Viswanathan–Ramamoorthy		
1961	Manapanthal	Udalukku Uyir Kaval	Viswanathan–Ramamoorthy		
1961	Manapanthal	Ore Raagam Ore Thaalam	Viswanathan–Ramamoorthy		
1961	Manapanthal	Muthu Muthu Pacharisi	Viswanathan–Ramamoorthy		
1961	Manapanthal	Ammavukku Manasukkule	Viswanathan–Ramamoorthy		
1961	Manapanthal	Petroduthu Peyarumittu	Viswanathan–Ramamoorthy		
1961	Palum Pazhamum	Naan Pesa ninaipathellam	Viswanathan–Ramamoorthy		
1961	Palum Pazhamum	Alaiyamaniyin Osaiyai	Viswanathan–Ramamoorthy		
1961	Palum Pazhamum	Ennai Yaar Yaar	Viswanathan–Ramamoorthy	Sindhu Bhairavi	
1961	Palum Pazhamum	Kadhal Siragai	Viswanathan–Ramamoorthy	Kapi	
1961	Palum Pazhamum	Intha Nadagam	Viswanathan–Ramamoorthy	Shubhapantuvarali	
1961	Palum Pazhamum	Paalum Pazhamum	Viswanathan–Ramamoorthy	Natabhairavi	
1961	Palum Pazhamum	Naan Pesa (Pathos)	Viswanathan–Ramamoorthy		
1961	Palum Pazhamum	Thendral Varum	Viswanathan–Ramamoorthy		
1961	Palum Pazhamum	Ponaal Pogattum Podaa	Viswanathan–Ramamoorthy		
1961	Panithirai	Ore Kelvi	K. V. Mahadevan		
1961	Panithirai	Varuga Varugavendru	K. V. Mahadevan		
1961	Panithirai	Aayiram Penmai	K. V. Mahadevan		
1961	Panithirai	Irukkumidam	K. V. Mahadevan		
1961	Panithirai	Kungummathai	K. V. Mahadevan		
1961	Panithirai	Yedho Manidhan	K. V. Mahadevan		
1961	Pasamalar	Malarandhum Malaradha	Viswanathan–Ramamoorthy		
1961	Pasamalar	Yaar Yaar Yaar Aval	Viswanathan–Ramamoorthy		
1961	Pasamalar	Engalukkum Kaalam	Viswanathan–Ramamoorthy		
1961	Pasamalar	Vaarayo Thozhi	Viswanathan–Ramamoorthy	Abheri	
1961	Pasamalar	Paattondru Ketten	Viswanathan–Ramamoorthy		
1961	Pasamalar	Malargalai Pol Thangai	Viswanathan–Ramamoorthy		
1961	Pasamalar	Malargalai Pol (pathos)	Viswanathan–Ramamoorthy		
1961	Pasamalar	Mayangugiraal Oru Maadhu	Viswanathan–Ramamoorthy		
1961	Pasamalar	Anbu Malar	Viswanathan–Ramamoorthy		
1961	Thaai Sollai Thattadhe	Kaattukkulle Thiruvizha	K. V. Mahadevan		
1961	Thaai Sollai Thattadhe	Katturani Kottaiyile	K. V. Mahadevan		
1961	Thaai Sollai Thattadhe	Poo uruanguthu	K. V. Mahadevan		
1961	Thaai Sollai Thattadhe	Oruthi Maganaay	K. V. Mahadevan		
1961	Thaai Sollai Thattadhe	Paattu Oru Paattu	K. V. Mahadevan		
1961	Thaai Sollai Thattadhe	Pattu Selai Kaathada	K. V. Mahadevan		
1961	Thaai Sollai Thattadhe	Poyum Poyum Manidhanukku	K. V. Mahadevan		
1961	Thaai Sollai Thattadhe	Sirithu Siruthu Ennai	K. V. Mahadevan		
1961	Then Nilavu	Chinna Chinna Kannile	A. M. Rajah		
1961	Then Nilavu	Kaalaiyum Neeye Malaiyum	A. M. Rajah		
1961	Then Nilavu	Paattu Padavaa	A. M. Rajah		
1961	Then Nilavu	Malare Malare	A. M. Rajah		
1961	Then Nilavu	Oho Enthan Baby	A. M. Rajah		
1961	Then Nilavu	Nilavum Malarum Paduthu	A. M. Rajah		
1961	Then Nilavu	Oorengum Thedinen	A. M. Rajah		
1961	Thirudathe	Ennaruge Nee Irundhaal	S. M. Subbaiah Naidu		
1962	Deivathin Deivam	Kannukkul Ethanai Vellamadi	G. Ramanathan		
1962	Deivathin Deivam	Paattu Pada Vaayeduthen	G. Ramanathan		
1962	Deivathin Deivam	Nee Illadha Ulagathile	G. Ramanathan		
1962	Aadi Perukku	Kannizhandha Manidhar	A. M. Rajah		
1962	Aadi Perukku	Idhuthaan Ulagamaa	A. M. Rajah		
1962	Aalayamani	Kannana Kannanukku	Viswanathan–Ramamoorthy		
1962	Aalayamani	Kallellam Manickka	Viswanathan–Ramamoorthy	Mayamalavagowla	
1962	Aalayamani	Ponnai Virumbum	Viswanathan–Ramamoorthy		
1962	Aalayamani	Satti Suttadhada	Viswanathan–Ramamoorthy	Bilaskhani Todi	
1962	Aalayamani	Maanaattam Vanna	Viswanathan–Ramamoorthy		
1962	Aalayamani	Thookkam Un Kangalai	Viswanathan–Ramamoorthy		
1962	Aalayamani	Karunai Magan	Viswanathan–Ramamoorthy		
1962	Bale Pandiya	Vaazha Ninaithaal Vaazhalam	Viswanathan–Ramamoorthy		
1962	Bale Pandiya	Naan Enna Sollivitten	Viswanathan–Ramamoorthy		
1962	Bale Pandiya	Neeye Unakku Endrum	Viswanathan–Ramamoorthy	Suddha Dhanyasi	
1962	Bale Pandiya	Adhimanithan Kadhalukku	Viswanathan–Ramamoorthy		
1962	Bale Pandiya	Yaarai Enge Vaippathu	Viswanathan–Ramamoorthy		
1962	Bale Pandiya	Athikkai Kaai Kaai	Viswanathan–Ramamoorthy		
1962	Bale Pandiya	Vaazha Ninaithaal (2)	Viswanathan–Ramamoorthy		
1962	Kathiruntha Kangal	Kaatru Vandhal Thalai	Viswanathan–Ramamoorthy		
1962	Kathiruntha Kangal	Odam Nadhiyinile	Viswanathan–Ramamoorthy		
1962	Kathiruntha Kangal	Valarndha Kalai Marandhu	Viswanathan–Ramamoorthy		
1962	Kathiruntha Kangal	Thulli Thirindha Penn	Viswanathan–Ramamoorthy		
1962	Kathiruntha Kangal	Kann Padume Pirar	Viswanathan–Ramamoorthy		
1962	Kathiruntha Kangal	Vaa Endrathu Uravu	Viswanathan–Ramamoorthy		
1962	Kudumba Thalaivan	Androoru Naal	K. V. Mahadevan		
1962	Kudumba Thalaivan	Mazhai Pozhindhukonde	K. V. Mahadevan		
1962	Kudumba Thalaivan	Kuruvi Koottam Pola	K. V. Mahadevan		
1962	Kudumba Thalaivan	Yedho Yedho Oru Mayakkam	K. V. Mahadevan		
1962	Kudumba Thalaivan	Kattana Kattazhagu Kanna	K. V. Mahadevan		
1962	Kudumba Thalaivan	Maradhaiyya Maradhu	K. V. Mahadevan		
1962	Kudumba Thalaivan	Thirumanamam Thirumanamam	K. V. Mahadevan		
1962	Muthu Mandapam	Enna Solli Paaduven	K. V. Mahadevan		
1962	Muthu Mandapam	Porkalam Porkalam	K. V. Mahadevan		
1962	Muthu Mandapam	Kodiyavale Poongodiyavale	K. V. Mahadevan		
1962	Muthu Mandapam	Sonnalum Vetkamada	K. V. Mahadevan		
1962	Nichaya Thaamboolam	Andavan Padachan Enkitta	Viswanathan–Ramamoorthy		
1962	Nichaya Thaamboolam	Padaithaane Padaithaane	Viswanathan–Ramamoorthy	Bilaskhani Todi	
1962	Nichaya Thaamboolam	Paavadai Thavaniyil Paartha	Viswanathan–Ramamoorthy		
1962	Nichaya Thaamboolam	Ithu Ver Ulgam	Viswanathan–Ramamoorthy		
1962	Nichaya Thaamboolam	Alangaram Alangaram	Viswanathan–Ramamoorthy		
1962	Nichaya Thaamboolam	Maalai Soodum Mananaal	Viswanathan–Ramamoorthy		
1962	Nichaya Thaamboolam	Nethiyile Oru Kungumapottu	Viswanathan–Ramamoorthy		
1962	Nichaya Thaamboolam	Nee Nadanthaal Enna	Viswanathan–Ramamoorthy		
1962	Paadha Kaanikkai	Atthai Magane Poi	Viswanathan–Ramamoorthy		
1962	Paadha Kaanikkai	Ettaadukku Maaligaiyil	Viswanathan–Ramamoorthy		
1962	Paadha Kaanikkai	Poojaikku Vandha Malare	Viswanathan–Ramamoorthy		
1962	Paadha Kaanikkai	Unadhu Malar Kodiyile	Viswanathan–Ramamoorthy		
1962	Paadha Kaanikkai	Kadhal Enbathu Edhuvarai	Viswanathan–Ramamoorthy		
1962	Paadha Kaanikkai	Veedu Varai Uravu	Viswanathan–Ramamoorthy		
1962	Paadha Kaanikkai	Sonnathellam Nadanthidumaa	Viswanathan–Ramamoorthy		
1962	Paadha Kaanikkai	Thaniya Thavikkira	Viswanathan–Ramamoorthy		
1962	Paarthaal Pasi Theerum	Andru Oomai Pennallo	Viswanathan–Ramamoorthy		
1962	Paarthaal Pasi Theerum	Paarthaal Pasi Theerum	Viswanathan–Ramamoorthy		
1962	Paarthaal Pasi Theerum	Pillaikku Thandhai Oruvan	Viswanathan–Ramamoorthy		
1962	Paarthaal Pasi Theerum	Andru Oomai Pennallo (F)	Viswanathan–Ramamoorthy		
1962	Paarthaal Pasi Theerum	Yaarukku Mappillai Yaaro	Viswanathan–Ramamoorthy		
1962	Paarthaal Pasi Theerum	Kodiyaasaindhathum Kaatru	Viswanathan–Ramamoorthy		
1962	Paarthaal Pasi Theerum	Ullam Enbathu Aamai	Viswanathan–Ramamoorthy		
1962	Paasam	Jal Jal Jalennum	Viswanathan–Ramamoorthy		
1962	Paasam	Paal Vannam Paruvam	Viswanathan–Ramamoorthy		
1962	Paasam	Uruvu Solla Oruvan	Viswanathan–Ramamoorthy		
1962	Paasam	Thearadthu Silaiyethu	Viswanathan–Ramamoorthy		
1962	Paasam	Maalaiyum Iravum Santhikkum	Viswanathan–Ramamoorthy		
1962	Paasam	Ulagam Pirandhathu	Viswanathan–Ramamoorthy		
1962	Paasam	Vangaikku Kurivaithu	Viswanathan–Ramamoorthy		
1962	Padithal Mattum Podhuma	Annan Kaattiya Vazhiyamma	K. V. Mahadevan		
1962	Padithal Mattum Podhuma	Pennondru Kanden	K. V. Mahadevan	Brindabani Sarang	
1962	Padithal Mattum Podhuma	Komali Komali (Kaalam Seitha)	K. V. Mahadevan		
1962	Padithal Mattum Podhuma	Naan Kavingnanum Illai	K. V. Mahadevan		
1962	Padithal Mattum Podhuma	Nallavan Enakku Naane	K. V. Mahadevan		
1962	Padithal Mattum Podhuma	Ohoh Manidhargale	K. V. Mahadevan		
1962	Raani Samyuktha	Paavai Unakku	K. V. Mahadevan		
1962	Raani Samyuktha	O Vennila O Vennila	K. V. Mahadevan		
1962	Raani Samyuktha	Nilavenna Pesum	K. V. Mahadevan		
1962	Raani Samyuktha	Chiththirathil Pennezhudhi	K. V. Mahadevan		
1962	Raani Samyuktha	Idhazh Irandum	K. V. Mahadevan		
1962	Raani Samyuktha	Nenjirukkum Varaikkum	K. V. Mahadevan		
1962	Raani Samyuktha	Manavar Kulam Paaramma	K. V. Mahadevan		
1962	Raani Samyuktha	Mullaimalar Kaadu	K. V. Mahadevan		
1962	Thayai Katha Thanayan	Kaattu Rani Kottaiyile	K. V. Mahadevan		
1962	Thayai Katha Thanayan	Moodi Thirandha Imai	K. V. Mahadevan		
1962	Thayai Katha Thanayan	Katti Thangam Vetti	K. V. Mahadevan		
1962	Thayai Katha Thanayan	Kaviri Karairukku	K. V. Mahadevan		
1962	Thayai Katha Thanayan	Perai Sollalaamaa Kanavan	K. V. Mahadevan		
1962	Thayai Katha Thanayan	Sandi Kuthirai Nondi	K. V. Mahadevan		
1962	Thayai Katha Thanayan	Nadakkum Enbar	K. V. Mahadevan		
1962	Vadivukku Valai Kappu	Sillenna Poothathu	K. V. Mahadevan		
1962	Vadivukku Valai Kappu	Nilladiyo Nilladiyo	K. V. Mahadevan		
1962	Vadivukku Valai Kappu	Pillai Manam	K. V. Mahadevan		
1962	Valar Pirai	Kalakalakkuthu Kaatru	K. V. Mahadevan		
1962	Valar Pirai	Mounam Mounam	K. V. Mahadevan		
1962	Valar Pirai	Naangu Suvargalukkul	K. V. Mahadevan		
1962	Valar Pirai	Koondu Thirandhathamma	K. V. Mahadevan		
1962	Valar Pirai	PachchaiKodiyil	K. V. Mahadevan		
1962	Valar Pirai	Poojiyathukkule Oru	K. V. Mahadevan		
1962	Veerathirumagan	Roja Malare Rajakumari	Viswanathan–Ramamoorthy		
1962	Veerathirumagan	Kettathu Kidaikkum	Viswanathan–Ramamoorthy		
1962	Veerathirumagan	Paadatha Paattellam	Viswanathan–Ramamoorthy		
1962	Veerathirumagan	Etruga Deepam	Viswanathan–Ramamoorthy		
1962	Veerathirumagan	Vethala Potta Pathini	Viswanathan–Ramamoorthy		
1962	Veerathirumagan	Neelapattadai Katti	Viswanathan–Ramamoorthy		
1962	Veerathirumagan	Azhagukku Azhagu	Viswanathan–Ramamoorthy		
1962	Veerathirumagan	Ontotu Ondrai	Viswanathan–Ramamoorthy		
1962	Veerathirumagan	Azhivathu Pol	Viswanathan–Ramamoorthy		
1962	Vikramaadhithan	Kanni Pennin Roja	S. Rajeswara Rao		
1963	Anandha Jodhi	Kaala Magal	Viswanathan–Ramamoorthy	Shubhapantuvarali	
1963	Anandha Jodhi	Kadavul Irukkindraar	Viswanathan–Ramamoorthy		
1963	Anandha Jodhi	Pani Illaadha Margazhiyaa	Viswanathan–Ramamoorthy		
1963	Anandha Jodhi	Poyyile Pirandhu	Viswanathan–Ramamoorthy		
1963	Anandha Jodhi	Ninaikka Therindha	Viswanathan–Ramamoorthy		
1963	Anandha Jodhi	Oru Thaai Makkal	Viswanathan–Ramamoorthy		
1963	Anandha Jodhi	Pala Pala Ragamaa	Viswanathan–Ramamoorthy		
1963	Annai Illam	Ennirandu Padhinaaru	K. V. Mahadevan		
1963	Annai Illam	Nadaiyaa Idhu	K. V. Mahadevan		
1963	Annai Illam	Madi Meethu Thalai	K. V. Mahadevan		
1963	Annai Illam	Sivappu Vilakku	K. V. Mahadevan		
1963	Annai Illam	Enna Illai Enakku	K. V. Mahadevan		
1963	Dharmam Thalai Kaakkum	Dharmam Thalai Kaakkum	K. V. Mahadevan		
1963	Dharmam Thalai Kaakkum	Moodupani Kulireduthu	K. V. Mahadevan		
1963	Dharmam Thalai Kaakkum	Hello Hello Sugamaa	K. V. Mahadevan		
1963	Dharmam Thalai Kaakkum	Azhagana Vazhai	K. V. Mahadevan		
1963	Dharmam Thalai Kaakkum	Oruvan Manathu Onbathadaa	K. V. Mahadevan		
1963	Dharmam Thalai Kaakkum	Paravaigale	K. V. Mahadevan		
1963	Dharmam Thalai Kaakkum	Thottuvida Thottuvida	K. V. Mahadevan		
1963	Idhayathil Nee	Thottathu Mappillai	Viswanathan–Ramamoorthy		
1963	Idhu Sathiyam	Saravana Poikayil	Viswanathan–Ramamoorthy		
1963	Idhu Sathiyam	Sathiyam Idhu	Viswanathan–Ramamoorthy		
1963	Idhu Sathiyam	Kunguma Pottu	Viswanathan–Ramamoorthy		
1963	Idhu Sathiyam	Manam Kanivaana	Viswanathan–Ramamoorthy		
1963	Idhu Sathiyam	Kadhalilae Patru Vaithaal	Viswanathan–Ramamoorthy		
1963	Idhu Sathiyam	Singara Thaerukku	Viswanathan–Ramamoorthy		
1963	Iruvar Ullam	Paravaigal Palavitham	K. V. Mahadevan		
1963	Iruvar Ullam	Idhaya Veenai Thoongum	K. V. Mahadevan		
1963	Iruvar Ullam	Puthi Sigaamani Petra	K. V. Mahadevan		
1963	Iruvar Ullam	Kannethire Thondrinaal	K. V. Mahadevan		
1963	Iruvar Ullam	Nadhiyenge Pogirathu	K. V. Mahadevan		
1963	Iruvar Ullam	Azhagu Sirikkindrathu	K. V. Mahadevan		
1963	Iruvar Ullam	Yaen Azhudhaay Yaen	K. V. Mahadevan		
1963	Kadavulai Kanden	Vidiya Vidiya	K. V. Mahadevan		
1963	Kadavulai Kanden	Ungal Kaigal Uyarattum	K. V. Mahadevan		
1963	Kadavulai Kanden	Deepathai Vaithukondu	K. V. Mahadevan		
1963	Kadavulai Kanden	Anna Anna Sugam	K. V. Mahadevan		
1963	Kadavulai Kanden	Konjam Sindhikkanum	K. V. Mahadevan		
1963	Kadavulai Kanden	Kadavul Enge Kadavul	K. V. Mahadevan		
1963	Kadavulai Kanden	Poi Sonnare Poi	K. V. Mahadevan		
1963	Kalyaniyin Kanavan	Enakku Vaikkum Mappillai	S. M. Subbaiah Naidu		
1963	Kalyaniyin Kanavan	Solli Theriyadhu	S. M. Subbaiah Naidu		
1963	Kalyaniyin Kanavan	Kai Irukku Kaal Irukku	S. M. Subbaiah Naidu		
1963	Kalyaniyin Kanavan	Enadhu Raaja Sabaiyile	S. M. Subbaiah Naidu		
1963	Kalyaniyin Kanavan	Aasai Konda Manam	S. M. Subbaiah Naidu		
1963	Kalyaniyin Kanavan	Kalyana Pudavai Katti	S. M. Subbaiah Naidu		
1963	Kalyaniyin Kanavan	Naal Ondrum Pozhudhu	S. M. Subbaiah Naidu		
1963	Kalyaniyin Kanavan	Unakka Theriyadhu	S. M. Subbaiah Naidu		
1963	Kalyaniyin Kanavan	Ethaiyum Nandra	S. M. Subbaiah Naidu		
1963	Kattu Roja	Vandondru Vandhathu	K. V. Mahadevan		
1963	Kattu Roja	Yendi Roja Ennadi	K. V. Mahadevan		
1963	Koduthu Vaithaval	Ennamma Sowkiyama	K. V. Mahadevan		
1963	Koduthu Vaithaval	Naan Yaar Theriyumaa	K. V. Mahadevan		
1963	Koduthu Vaithaval	Paalaatril Velaaduthu	K. V. Mahadevan		
1963	Kulamagal Radhai	Iravukku Aayiram Kangal	K. V. Mahadevan		
1963	Kulamagal Radhai	Aaruyire Mannavare	K. V. Mahadevan		
1963	Kulamagal Radhai	Chandiranai Kaanamal	K. V. Mahadevan		
1963	Kulamagal Radhai	Pagalile Chandhiranai	K. V. Mahadevan		
1963	Kulamagal Radhai	Ullam Ithile Adanguthu	K. V. Mahadevan		
1963	Kulamagal Radhai	Unnai Solli Kutramillai	K. V. Mahadevan		
1963	Kungumam	Poonthotta Kaavalkaara	K. V. Mahadevan		
1963	Kungumam	Kaalangal Thorum	K. V. Mahadevan		
1963	Kungumam	Thoongatha Kannindru	K. V. Mahadevan		
1963	Kungumam	Chinna Chiriya Vanna	K. V. Mahadevan		
1963	Kungumam	Kungumam	K. V. Mahadevan		
1963	Kungumam	Mayakkam Enadhu	K. V. Mahadevan		
1963	Naanum Oru Penn	Kanna Karumai Nira	R. Sudharsanam		
1963	Needhikkuppin Paasam	Akkam Pakkam	K. V. Mahadevan		
1963	Needhikkuppin Paasam	Idi Idichu Mazhai	K. V. Mahadevan		
1963	Needhikkuppin Paasam	Kaadu Kodutha	K. V. Mahadevan		
1963	Needhikkuppin Paasam	Maanallavo Kangal	K. V. Mahadevan		
1963	Needhikkuppin Paasam	Sirithaalum Podhume	K. V. Mahadevan		
1963	Needhikkuppin Paasam	Vaanga Vaanga	K. V. Mahadevan		
1963	Needhikkuppin Paasam	Ponaley	K. V. Mahadevan		
1963	Panathottam	Pesuvathu Kiliya	Viswanathan–Ramamoorthy	Bilaskhani Todi	
1963	Panathottam	Orunaal Iravil Kann	Viswanathan–Ramamoorthy		
1963	Panathottam	Oruvar Oruvaraai Pirandhom	Viswanathan–Ramamoorthy		
1963	Panathottam	Javvaathu Medaiyittu	Viswanathan–Ramamoorthy		
1963	Panathottam	Ennathaan Nadakkum	Viswanathan–Ramamoorthy		
1963	Panathottam	Pananthottam	Viswanathan–Ramamoorthy		
1963	Paar Magaley Paar	Madhura Nagaril Thamizh	Viswanathan–Ramamoorthy		
1963	Paar Magaley Paar	Neerodum Vaigaiyile	Viswanathan–Ramamoorthy		
1963	Paar Magaley Paar	Vetkamaai Irukkuthadi	Viswanathan–Ramamoorthy		
1963	Paar Magaley Paar	Aval Parandhu Ponaale	Viswanathan–Ramamoorthy		
1963	Paar Magaley Paar	Ennai Thottu	Viswanathan–Ramamoorthy		
1963	Paar Magaley Paar	Enthan Kannai	Viswanathan–Ramamoorthy		
1963	Paar Magaley Paar	Paar Magaley Paar	Viswanathan–Ramamoorthy		
1963	Paar Magaley Paar	Paar Magaley Paar -2	Viswanathan–Ramamoorthy		
1963	Paar Magaley Paar	Poochudum Nerathile	Viswanathan–Ramamoorthy		
1963	Paar Magaley Paar	Thuyil Kondal	Viswanathan–Ramamoorthy		
1963	Parisu	Aala Paarthu	K. V. Mahadevan		
1963	Parisu	Enna Enna Inikkuthu	K. V. Mahadevan		
1963	Parisu	Koonthal Karuppu	K. V. Mahadevan		
1963	Parisu	Ponnulagam Nokki	K. V. Mahadevan		
1963	Parisu	Kaalamennum	K. V. Mahadevan		
1963	Parisu	Pattu Vanna Chittu	K. V. Mahadevan		
1963	Periya Idathu Penn	Andru Vandhathu adhe	Viswanathan–Ramamoorthy		
1963	Periya Idathu Penn	Andru Vandhathu Idhe (Pathos)	Viswanathan–Ramamoorthy		
1963	Periya Idathu Penn	Kannenna Kannenna	Viswanathan–Ramamoorthy		
1963	Periya Idathu Penn	Paarappa Pazhaniyappa	Viswanathan–Ramamoorthy		
1963	Periya Idathu Penn	Avanukkenna Thoongivittaan	Viswanathan–Ramamoorthy		
1963	Periya Idathu Penn	Thulli Odum Kalgalenge	Viswanathan–Ramamoorthy		
1963	Periya Idathu Penn	Kattudo Kuzhalaada Aada	Viswanathan–Ramamoorthy		
1963	Periya Idathu Penn	Ragasiyam Parama	Viswanathan–Ramamoorthy		
1963	Ratha Thilagam	Buddhan Vandhan	K. V. Mahadevan		
1963	Ratha Thilagam	Pasumai Niraindha	K. V. Mahadevan		
1963	Ratha Thilagam	Oru Koppaiyie En	K. V. Mahadevan		
1963	Ratha Thilagam	Pani Padarndha	K. V. Mahadevan		
1963	Ratha Thilagam	Happy Birthday	K. V. Mahadevan		
1963	Ratha Thilagam	Pogathe Pogathe	K. V. Mahadevan		
1963	Ratha Thilagam	Thaazhampoove	K. V. Mahadevan		
1963	Ratha Thilagam	Vaadaikaatramma	K. V. Mahadevan		
1963	Vanambadi	Gangai Karai Thottam	K. V. Mahadevan	Abheri	
1963	Vanambadi	Kadavul Manidhanaga	K. V. Mahadevan		
1963	Vanambadi	Oomai Pennoru Kanavu	K. V. Mahadevan		
1963	Vanambadi	Thookkananguruvi Koodu	K. V. Mahadevan	Suddha Dhanyasi with Charukesi	
1963	Vanambadi	Aankaviyai Vella Vandha	K. V. Mahadevan		
1963	Vanambadi	Nil Kavani Purappadu	K. V. Mahadevan		
1963	Vanambadi	Yetti Ezhuthi Vaithen	K. V. Mahadevan		
1963	Vanambadi	Yaaradi Vandhaar Ennadi	K. V. Mahadevan		
1964	Aandavan Kattalai	Azhage Vaa Aruge	Viswanathan–Ramamoorthy		
1964	Aandavan Kattalai	Kannirendum Minnaminna	Viswanathan–Ramamoorthy		
1964	Aandavan Kattalai	Amaithiyana Nathiyinile	Viswanathan–Ramamoorthy		
1964	Aandavan Kattalai	Aaru Maname Aaru	Viswanathan–Ramamoorthy	Bilaskhani Todi	
1964	Aandavan Kattalai	Sirippu Varuthu	Viswanathan–Ramamoorthy		
1964	Aandavan Kattalai	Amaithiyana (pathos)	Viswanathan–Ramamoorthy		
1964	Aayiram Roobai	Paarthaalum Paarthen	K. V. Mahadevan		
1964	Aayiram Roobai	Nilavukkum Nizhal Undu	K. V. Mahadevan		
1964	Alli	Kaviri Meenadiyo	K. V. Mahadevan		
1964	Alli	Unnaiyandri	K. V. Mahadevan		
1964	Dheiva Thaai	Moondrezhuthil En	Viswanathan–Ramamoorthy		
1964	Dheiva Thaai	Vannakili Sonna	Viswanathan–Ramamoorthy		
1964	Dheiva Thaai	Intha Punnagai Enna	Viswanathan–Ramamoorthy		
1964	Dheiva Thaai	Oru Pennai Paarthu	Viswanathan–Ramamoorthy		
1964	Dheiva Thaai	Kadhalikkathe Kavalai	Viswanathan–Ramamoorthy		
1964	Dheiva Thaai	Paruvam Pona Padhaiyile	Viswanathan–Ramamoorthy		
1964	Dheiva Thaai	Unmaikku Veliyithu	Viswanathan–Ramamoorthy		
1964	En Kadamai	Hello Miss Hello	Viswanathan–Ramamoorthy		
1964	En Kadamai	Meene Meene Meenamma	Viswanathan–Ramamoorthy		
1964	En Kadamai	Yaaradhu Yaaradhu	Viswanathan–Ramamoorthy		
1964	En Kadamai	Nilladi Nilladi Seematti	Viswanathan–Ramamoorthy		
1964	En Kadamai	Thenodum Thanneerim	Viswanathan–Ramamoorthy		
1964	En Kadamai	Iravinile Yeppa	Viswanathan–Ramamoorthy		
1964	Kadhalikka Neramillai	Enna Paravai Unthan	Viswanathan–Ramamoorthy		
1964	Kadhalikka Neramillai	Unga Ponnana Kaigal	Viswanathan–Ramamoorthy		
1964	Kadhalikka Neramillai	Maadi Mela Maadi	Viswanathan–Ramamoorthy		
1964	Kadhalikka Neramillai	Naalam Naalam Thirnaalam	Viswanathan–Ramamoorthy		
1964	Kadhalikka Neramillai	Anubavam Puthumai	Viswanathan–Ramamoorthy	loosely based Spanish song "Bésame Mucho"	
1964	Kadhalikka Neramillai	Kadhalikka Neramillai	Viswanathan–Ramamoorthy		
1964	Kadhalikka Neramillai	Malarendra Mugam	Viswanathan–Ramamoorthy		
1964	Kadhalikka Neramillai	Nenjathai Alli	Viswanathan–Ramamoorthy		
1964	Kai Koduttha Dheivam	Kulunga Kulunga	Viswanathan–Ramamoorthy		
1964	Kai Koduttha Dheivam	Aayirathil Oruthiyamma	Viswanathan–Ramamoorthy		
1964	Kai Koduttha Dheivam	"Mangala Melam"	Viswanathan–Ramamoorthy		
1964	Karnan	En Uyir Thozhi	Viswanathan–Ramamoorthy	Hamir Kalyani	
1964	Karnan	Enna Koduppaan	Viswanathan–Ramamoorthy		
1964	Karnan	Iravum Nilavum	Viswanathan–Ramamoorthy	Hamsanadam	
1964	Karnan	Poi Vaa Magale	Viswanathan–Ramamoorthy	Anandabhairavi	
1964	Karnan	Majal Mugam Niram	Viswanathan–Ramamoorthy		
1964	Karnan	Ullathil Nalla Ullam	Viswanathan–Ramamoorthy	Chakravakam	
1964	Karnan	Kannukku Kulam Edhu	Viswanathan–Ramamoorthy	Pahadi	
1964	Karnan	Kangal Engey Nenjamum	Viswanathan–Ramamoorthy	Suddha Dhanyasi	
1964	Karnan	Mazhai Kondukkum Kodiyo	Viswanathan–Ramamoorthy		
1964	Karnan	Aayiram Karangal Neetti	Viswanathan–Ramamoorthy		
1964	Karnan	Maranathai Enni	Viswanathan–Ramamoorthy		
1964	Karnan	Naanichivanthana	Viswanathan–Ramamoorthy	Darbari Kanada	
1964	Karnan	Pathithranaya Sathuna	Viswanathan–Ramamoorthy		
1964	Karnan	Malargal Sutti Majal (pathos)	Viswanathan–Ramamoorthy		
1964	Karnan	Mannavar Porulkalai	Viswanathan–Ramamoorthy		
1964	Karnan	Maharajan	Viswanathan–Ramamoorthy	Kharaharapriya	
1964	Navarathri	Navarathri Subarathiri	K. V. Mahadevan		
1964	Navarathri	Iravinil Aattam	K. V. Mahadevan		
1964	Navarathri	Sollavaa Kadhai	K. V. Mahadevan		
1964	Navarathri	Vandha Naal	K. V. Mahadevan		
1964	Navarathri	Pottathu Mulachiduchi	K. V. Mahadevan		
1964	Pachai Vilakku	Kelvi Pirandhathu	Viswanathan–Ramamoorthy		
1964	Pachai Vilakku	Thoodhu Solla Oru	Viswanathan–Ramamoorthy		
1964	Pachai Vilakku	Aval Mella Sirithaal	Viswanathan–Ramamoorthy		
1964	Pachai Vilakku	Varathiruppaano Vanna	Viswanathan–Ramamoorthy		
1964	Pachai Vilakku	Kanni Venduma Kavithai	Viswanathan–Ramamoorthy		
1964	Pachai Vilakku	Olimayamana Edhirkalam	Viswanathan–Ramamoorthy		
1964	Pachai Vilakku	Olimayamana	Viswanathan–Ramamoorthy		
1964	Panakkara Kudumbam	Ondru Engal Jaathiye	Viswanathan–Ramamoorthy		
1964	Panakkara Kudumbam	Vaadiyamma Vaadi	Viswanathan–Ramamoorthy		
1964	Panakkara Kudumbam	Athai Magal Rathinathai	Viswanathan–Ramamoorthy		
1964	Panakkara Kudumbam	Parakkum Bandhu	Viswanathan–Ramamoorthy		
1964	Panakkara Kudumbam	Ithuvarai Neengal	Viswanathan–Ramamoorthy		
1964	Panakkara Kudumbam	Pallakku Vaanga	Viswanathan–Ramamoorthy		
1964	Panakkara Kudumbam	Athai Magal 2	Viswanathan–Ramamoorthy		
1964	Panakkara Kudumbam	Unnai Nambinaal	Viswanathan–Ramamoorthy		
1964	Puthiya Paravai	Unnai Ondru Kettpen	Viswanathan–Ramamoorthy	Harikambhoji	
1964	Puthiya Paravai	Chittu Kuruvi	Viswanathan–Ramamoorthy		
1964	Puthiya Paravai	Aha Mella Nada	Viswanathan–Ramamoorthy		
1964	Puthiya Paravai	Paartha Gyabagam	Viswanathan–Ramamoorthy	Dean Martin's Sway	
1964	Puthiya Paravai	Paartha Gyabagam (pathos)	Viswanathan–Ramamoorthy		
1964	Puthiya Paravai	Engey Nimmathi	Viswanathan–Ramamoorthy	Bilaskhani Todi and Hindustani	
1964	Puthiya Paravai	Unnai Ondru (pathos)	Viswanathan–Ramamoorthy		
1964	Server Sundaram	Poga Poga Theriyum	Viswanathan–Ramamoorthy		
1964	Server Sundaram	Silai Eduthan	Viswanathan–Ramamoorthy		
1964	Server Sundaram	Thathai Nenjam	Viswanathan–Ramamoorthy		
1964	Server Sundaram	Pattondru Tharuvaar	Viswanathan–Ramamoorthy		
1964	Vazhkai Vazhvatharke	Avan Porukkup Ponaan	Viswanathan–Ramamoorthy		
1964	Vazhkai Vazhvatharke	Naan Paadiya Paadal	Viswanathan–Ramamoorthy		
1964	Vazhkai Vazhvatharke	Azhagu Rasipatharkke	Viswanathan–Ramamoorthy		
1964	Vazhkai Vazhvatharke	Aadankkanbathu Kaviri Vellam	Viswanathan–Ramamoorthy		
1964	Vazhkai Vazhvatharke	Aathoram Manaleduthu	Viswanathan–Ramamoorthy		
1964	Vazhkai Vazhvatharke	Aathoram Manaleduthu (Pathos)	Viswanathan–Ramamoorthy		
1964	Vazhkai Vazhvatharke	Nenjathil Iruppathu Enna	Viswanathan–Ramamoorthy		
1964	Vazhkai Vazhvatharke	Pachae Kuzhandhaiyo	Viswanathan–Ramamoorthy		
1964	Vettaikaaran	Unnai Arindhaal	K. V. Mahadevan		
1964	Vettaikaaran	Methuva Methuva	K. V. Mahadevan		
1964	Vettaikaaran	Velli Nila Mutrathille	K. V. Mahadevan		
1964	Vettaikaaran	Seettukattu Raja Raja	K. V. Mahadevan		
1964	Vettaikaaran	Manjal Mugame Varuga	K. V. Mahadevan		
1964	Vettaikaaran	En Kannanukkethanai	K. V. Mahadevan		
1964	Vettaikaaran	Oru Kadhanayagan	K. V. Mahadevan		
1965	Aayirathil Oruvan	Naanamo Innum	Viswanathan–Ramamoorthy		
1965	Aayirathil Oruvan	Odum Megangale	Viswanathan–Ramamoorthy		
1965	Aayirathil Oruvan	Adho Antha Paravai	Viswanathan–Ramamoorthy		
1965	Hello Mister Zamindar	Hello Mister Zamindar	G. K. Venkatesh		
1965	Hello Mister Zamindar	Kadhal Nilave Kanmani	G. K. Venkatesh		
1965	Hello Mister Zamindar	Ilamai Kozhuvirukkum -(M)	G. K. Venkatesh		
1965	Hello Mister Zamindar	Ilamai Kizhuvirukkum - (F)	G. K. Venkatesh		
1965	Hello Mister Zamindar	Sondhamum Illai Oru	G. K. Venkatesh		
1965	Hello Mister Zamindar	Thotthil Poove	G. K. Venkatesh		
1965	Hello Mister Zamindar	Pattinikku Oru Manasu	G. K. Venkatesh		
1965	Hello Mister Zamindar	Kadhal Nilave (Pathos)	G. K. Venkatesh		
1965	Idhaya Kamalam	Mellatha Mella	K. V. Mahadevan		.
1965	Idhaya Kamalam	Malargal Nanaithana	K. V. Mahadevan		
1965	Idhaya Kamalam	Nee Pogumidallem	K. V. Mahadevan		
1965	Idhaya Kamalam	Unnai Kannaatha	K. V. Mahadevan		
1965	Idhaya Kamalam	Ennathaan Ragasiyamo	K. V. Mahadevan		
1965	Idhaya Kamalam	Thol Kanden	K. V. Mahadevan		
1965	Idhaya Kamalam	Title Song	K. V. Mahadevan		
1965	Kaakum Karangal	Akka Akka	K. V. Mahadevan		
1965	Kaakum Karangal	Alli Thandu Kaal	K. V. Mahadevan		
1965	Kaattu Rani	Moongil Ilaimele	P. S. Diwakar		
1965	Kaattu Rani	Kaattu Rani	P. S. Diwakar		
1965	Kaattu Rani	Solladha Kadhai	P. S. Diwakar		
1965	Kaattu Rani	Kaattu Pura Onnu	P. S. Diwakar		
1965	Kaattu Rani	Othaiyadi Padhaiyile	P. S. Diwakar		
1965	Kuzhandaiyum Deivamum	Kuzhandaiyum Deivamum	M. S. Viswanathan		
1965	Kuzhandaiyum Deivamum	Kuzhandhaiyum Deivamum -2	M. S. Viswanathan		
1965	Kuzhandaiyum Deivamum	Kozhi Oru Kottile	M. S. Viswanathan		
1965	Kuzhandaiyum Deivamum	Ahah Idhu Naliravu	M. S. Viswanathan		
1965	Pazhani	Aarodum Mannil	Viswanathan–Ramamoorthy		
1965	Pazhani	Vatta Vatta Paraiyile	Viswanathan–Ramamoorthy		
1965	Pazhani	Annan Ennada Thambi	Viswanathan–Ramamoorthy		
1965	Pazhani	Ullathukkulle	Viswanathan–Ramamoorthy		
1965	Pazhani	Idhayam irukkindratha	Viswanathan–Ramamoorthy		
1965	Pazhani	Annachi Vaetti	Viswanathan–Ramamoorthy		
1965	Santhi	"Yaarantha Nilavu"	Viswanathan–Ramamoorthy		
1965	Santhi	"Nenjathile Nee"	Viswanathan–Ramamoorthy		
1965	Santhi	"Oorengum Mappillai"	Viswanathan–Ramamoorthy		
1965	Santhi	"Senthur Murugan"	Viswanathan–Ramamoorthy		
1965	Santhi	"Senthur Murugan" (2)	Viswanathan–Ramamoorthy		
1965	Santhi	"Vaazhnthu Paarkka"	Viswanathan–Ramamoorthy		
1965	Santhi	"Theredu Silaiyedu"	Viswanathan–Ramamoorthy		
1965	Thiruvilaiyadal	Neela Selai	K. V. Mahadevan		
1965	Thiruvilaiyadal	Paartha Pasumaram	K. V. Mahadevan		
1965	Thiruvilaiyadal	Paattu Naane	K. V. Mahadevan	Gourimanohari	
1965	Thiruvilaiyadal	Oru Naal Podhuma	K. V. Mahadevan		
1965	Thiruvilaiyadal	Isai Thamizh Nee	K. V. Mahadevan	Abheri	
1965	Thiruvilaiyadal	Podhigai Malai	K. V. Mahadevan		
1965	Thiruvilaiyadal	Ondranavaan Uruvil	K. V. Mahadevan		
1965	Thiruvilaiyadal	Illadhathondrillai	K. V. Mahadevan	Simhendramadhyamam	
1965	Thiruvilaiyadal	Vaasi Vaasi	K. V. Mahadevan	Neelambari	
1965	Thiruvilaiyadal	Om Namachivaya	K. V. Mahadevan		
1965	Vallavanukku Vallavan	Adaiya Paaru	Vedha		
1965	Vallavanukku Vallavan	Paaradi Kanne	Vedha		
1965	Vallavanukku Vallavan	Manam Ennum Medai	Vedha		
1965	Vallavanukku Vallavan	Oraayiram Parvaiyile	Vedha		
1965	Vallavanukku Vallavan	Pozhuthum Vidiyum	Vedha		
1965	Vallavanukku Vallavan	Kaliyile Kaathadicha	Vedha		
1965	Veera Abhimanyu	Paarthen Sirithen	K. V. Mahadevan	Sahana	
1965	Veera Abhimanyu	Ezhil Oviyam	K. V. Mahadevan		
1965	Veera Abhimanyu	Yugam Thorum Naan	K. V. Mahadevan		
1965	Veera Abhimanyu	Velum Villum	K. V. Mahadevan		
1965	Veera Abhimanyu	Thotta Idam	K. V. Mahadevan		
1965	Veera Abhimanyu	Povom Pudhu Ulagam	K. V. Mahadevan		
1965	Veera Abhimanyu	Kallathaname Uruvai	K. V. Mahadevan		
1965	Veera Abhimanyu	Kooraiyil Neruppinai	K. V. Mahadevan		
1965	Veera Abhimanyu	Neeyum Oru Pennanal	K. V. Mahadevan		
1965	Veera Abhimanyu	Thuvakathil	K. V. Mahadevan		
1965	Vennira Aadai	Chithirame Nilladi	Viswanathan–Ramamoorthy		
1965	Vennira Aadai	Nee Enbathenna	Viswanathan–Ramamoorthy		
1965	Vennira Aadai	Ammamma Kaatru	Viswanathan–Ramamoorthy		
1965	Vennira Aadai	Alli Panthal Kalgal	Viswanathan–Ramamoorthy		
1965	Vennira Aadai	Kannan Ennum	Viswanathan–Ramamoorthy		
1965	Vennira Aadai	Enna Enna Vaarthaigalo	Viswanathan–Ramamoorthy		
1965	Vennira Aadai	Oruvan Kadhalan	Viswanathan–Ramamoorthy		
1965	Vennira Aadai	Neethi Ithuthaana	Viswanathan–Ramamoorthy		
1965	Vennira Aadai	Neeradum Kangal	Viswanathan–Ramamoorthy	not included in this film	
1966	Chitthi	Thanneer Suduvathenna	K. V. Mahadevan		
1966	Chitthi	Kaalamidhu Kaalamidhu	K. V. Mahadevan		
1966	Chitthi	Inge Deivam Paathi	K. V. Mahadevan		
1966	Chitthi	Santhippomaa Indru	K. V. Mahadevan		
1966	Chitthi	Santhipoma (pathos)	K. V. Mahadevan		
1966	Chitthi	Maarum Kanni Manam	K. V. Mahadevan		
1966	Iru Vallavargal	Naan Malarodu	Vedha		
1966	Iru Vallavargal	Kaaviri Karaiyin	Vedha		
1966	Iru Vallavargal	Anubavi Jora	Vedha		
1966	Iru Vallavargal	Kuva Kuva Pappa	Vedha		
1966	Iru Vallavargal	Kaadhal Undaagum	Vedha		
1966	Iru Vallavargal	Un Pazhakathin Mel	Vedha		
1966	Iru Vallavargal	Uruvadhaal Pirivirukkum	Vedha		
1966	Iru Vallavargal	Angey Yen Intha	Vedha		
1966	Kodimalar	Mouname Paarvaiyal	M. S. Viswanathan		
1966	Kodimalar	Kannadi Meniyadi	M. S. Viswanathan		
1966	Kumari Penn	Thean Irukkum Malarinile	M. S. Viswanathan		
1966	Kumari Penn	Varushatha Paaru (F)	M. S. Viswanathan		
1966	Kumari Penn	Varushatha Paaru (M)	M. S. Viswanathan		
1966	Kumari Penn	Neeye Sollu	M. S. Viswanathan		
1966	Kumari Penn	Javare Jaav	M. S. Viswanathan		
1966	Kumari Penn	Yaaro Ada therindhavar	M. S. Viswanathan		
1966	Mahakavi Kalidasa	Kalaimagal Enakkoru	K. V. Mahadevan		
1966	Mahakavi Kalidasa	Senru Vaan Magane	K. V. Mahadevan		
1966	Mahakavi Kalidasa	Kaalathil Azhiyadha	K. V. Mahadevan		
1966	Mahakavi Kalidasa	Kuzhandhaiyin Kodugal	K. V. Mahadevan		
1966	Mahakavi Kalidasa	Kallaayi Vandhavan	K. V. Mahadevan		
1966	Mahakavi Kalidasa	Manicka Veenaiye	K. V. Mahadevan		
1966	Mahakavi Kalidasa	Chinnaiya Endrazhaitha	K. V. Mahadevan		
1966	Mani Magudam	Oh Paar Intha	K. V. Mahadevan		
1966	Mani Magudam	Aadhavan Uthithaan	K. V. Mahadevan		
1966	Mugaraasi	Thannerilum	K. V. Mahadevan		
1966	Mugaraasi	Enakkum Unakkum	K. V. Mahadevan		
1966	Mugaraasi	Undakki Vittavargal	K. V. Mahadevan		
1966	Mugaraasi	Mugathai Kaatti	K. V. Mahadevan		
1966	Mugaraasi	Enna Enna	K. V. Mahadevan		
1966	Nadodi	Ulagamengum Ore	M. S. Viswanathan		
1966	Nadodi	Kadavul Seitha	M. S. Viswanathan		
1966	Nadodi	Androru Naal	M. S. Viswanathan		
1966	Nadodi	Paadum Kural	M. S. Viswanathan		
1966	Nadodi	Rasikkathane Intha	M. S. Viswanathan		
1966	Nadodi	Kadavul Thandha	M. S. Viswanathan		
1966	Parakkum Paavai	Pattu Paavadai Enge	M. S. Viswanathan		
1966	Parakkum Paavai	Nilavennum Aadai	M. S. Viswanathan		
1966	Parakkum Paavai	Muthamo Mogamo	M. S. Viswanathan		
1966	Parakkum Paavai	Kalyana Naal Paarkka	M. S. Viswanathan		
1966	Parakkum Paavai	Unnai Thaane	M. S. Viswanathan		
1966	Parakkum Paavai	Sugam Ethile	M. S. Viswanathan		
1966	Parakkum Paavai	Yaarai Thaan	M. S. Viswanathan		
1966	Ramu	Pachai Maram	K. V. Mahadevan		
1966	Ramu	Nilave Ennidam	K. V. Mahadevan		
1966	Ramu	Muthu Chippi	K. V. Mahadevan		
1966	Ramu	Kannan Vandhan	K. V. Mahadevan		
1966	Ramu	Pachai Maram (pathos)	K. V. Mahadevan		
1966	Saraswathi Sabatham	Komatha Engal	K. V. Mahadevan	Abheri	
1966	Saraswathi Sabatham	Agaramuthala Ezhuthellam	K. V. Mahadevan		
1966	Saraswathi Sabatham	Kalviya Selvama	K. V. Mahadevan		
1966	Saraswathi Sabatham	Thaai Thandha Pichai	K. V. Mahadevan		
1966	Saraswathi Sabatham	Uruvathai Kaattidum	K. V. Mahadevan		
1966	Saraswathi Sabatham	Deivam Iruppathu	K. V. Mahadevan		
1966	Saraswathi Sabatham	Rani Maharani	K. V. Mahadevan		
1966	Thanipiravi	Sirippenna Sirippenna	K. V. Mahadevan		
1966	Thanipiravi	Uzhaikkum Kaigale	K. V. Mahadevan		
1966	Thanipiravi	Edhir Paaramal	K. V. Mahadevan		
1966	Thanipiravi	Oremurai Thaan	K. V. Mahadevan		
1966	Thanipiravi	Kannathil Ennadi	K. V. Mahadevan		
1966	Thanipiravi	Neram Nalla Neram	K. V. Mahadevan		
1966	Thanipiravi	Neram Nalla Neram (pathos)	K. V. Mahadevan		
1966	Vallavan Oruvan	Ammamma Kannathil	Vedha		
1966	Vallavan Oruvan	Thottu Thottu Paadava	Vedha		
1966	Vallavan Oruvan	Palinginaal Oru Maaligai	Vedha		
1966	Vallavan Oruvan	Muthu Ponnu Vamma	Vedha		
1966	Vallavan Oruvan	Innum Paarthu Kondirundhaal	Vedha		
1967	Bama Vijayam	Aani Muthu Vaangi	M. S. Viswanathan		
1967	Bama Vijayam	Ninaithaal Sirippu	M. S. Viswanathan		
1967	Bama Vijayam	Aadai Mariya	M. S. Viswanathan		
1967	Bama Vijayam	Kurukuru Nadai	M. S. Viswanathan		
1967	Bama Vijayam	Varavu Ettana	M. S. Viswanathan		
1967	Kandhan Karunai	Aarumugamana Porul	K. V. Mahadevan		
1967	Kandhan Karunai	Aarupadai Veedu	K. V. Mahadevan	Kambhoji	
1967	Kandhan Karunai	Kurunjiyile Poo	K. V. Mahadevan		
1967	Kandhan Karunai	Ariyathu Ketkum	K. V. Mahadevan		
1967	Kandhan Karunai	Manam Padaithen	K. V. Mahadevan		
1967	Kandhan Karunai	Mutham Thamizh	K. V. Mahadevan		
1967	Kandhan Karunai	Solla Solla	K. V. Mahadevan	Kundharavarali	
1967	Kandhan Karunai	Vetrivel Veeravel	K. V. Mahadevan		
1967	Nenjirukkum Varai	Ninaithaal Aduven	M. S. Viswanathan		
1967	Nenjirukkum Varai	Muthukkallo Kangal	M. S. Viswanathan		
1967	Nenjirukkum Varai	Poo Mudippal Intha	M. S. Viswanathan	Simhendramadhyamam	
1967	Nenjirukkum Varai	Kannan Varum	M. S. Viswanathan		
1967	Nenjirukkum Varai	Enge Neeyo Ange	M. S. Viswanathan		
1967	Thaikku Thalaimagan	Ainthikku Mele	K. V. Mahadevan		
1967	Thaikku Thalaimagan	Parthu Kondathu Kannukku	K. V. Mahadevan		
1967	Thaikku Thalaimagan	Vazha Vendum Manam	K. V. Mahadevan		
1967	Ooty Varai Uravu	Thedinen Vandhathu	M. S. Viswanathan		
1967	Ooty Varai Uravu	Rajaraja Sree Rajan	M. S. Viswanathan		
1967	Ooty Varai Uravu	Pudhu Nadagathil	M. S. Viswanathan		
1967	Ooty Varai Uravu	Ange Maalai Mayakkam	M. S. Viswanathan		
1967	Ooty Varai Uravu	Poomalaiyil Or	M. S. Viswanathan		
1967	Ooty Varai Uravu	Happy Indru Mudhal	M. S. Viswanathan		
1967	Ooty Varai Uravu	Yaarodum Pesakkoodathu	M. S. Viswanathan		
1967	Paaladai	Engey Engey En Kannukku	K. V. Mahadevan		
1967	Paaladai	Appadi Enna Parvai	K. V. Mahadevan		
1967	Paaladai	Pattadai Thottil	K. V. Mahadevan		
1967	Pattanathil Bhootham	Antha Sivagami	M. S. Viswanathan		
1967	Pattanathil Bhootham	Ulagathil Siranthathu	M. S. Viswanathan		
1967	Pattanathil Bhootham	Kannil Kandathellam	M. S. Viswanathan		
1967	Pattanathil Bhootham	Idhazhai Virithathu	M. S. Viswanathan		
1967	Pattanathil Bhootham	Naan Yaar Yaar	M. S. Viswanathan		
1967	Pattanathil Bhootham	Edhirpaaramal Virundhaali	M. S. Viswanathan		
1967	Selva Magal	Yae Parandhu Sellum	M. S. Viswanathan		
1967	Selva Magal	Avan Ninaithana	M. S. Viswanathan		
1967	Thangai	Kettavarellam Paadalam	M. S. Viswanathan		
1967	Thangai	Sugam Sugam	M. S. Viswanathan		
1967	Thangai	Thanneerile Thamaraipoo	M. S. Viswanathan		
1967	Thangai	Thanneerile Thamarai (pathos)	M. S. Viswanathan		
1967	Thangai	Iniyadhu Iniyadhu	M. S. Viswanathan		
1967	Thangai	Thathi Thathi	M. S. Viswanathan		
1967	Thangai	Ninaithen Ennai	M. S. Viswanathan		
1967	Thiruvarutchelvar	Mannavan Vanthanadi	K. V. Mahadevan	Kalyani	
1967	Thiruvarutchelvar	Irukkum Idathai Vittu	K. V. Mahadevan		
1967	Thiruvarutchelvar	Aadhi Sivan	K. V. Mahadevan		
1967	Thiruvarutchelvar	Naadhar Mudi	K. V. Mahadevan	Punnagavarali	
1967	Thiruvarutchelvar	Sadhuram Marainthaal	K. V. Mahadevan		
1967	Thiruvarutchelvar	Sithamellam Enkku	K. V. Mahadevan		
1967	Thiruvarutchelvar	Om Namachivaya	K. V. Mahadevan		
1967	Thiruvarutchelvar	Aathu Vellam	K. V. Mahadevan		
1967	Thiruvarutchelvar	Kadhalaagi	K. V. Mahadevan		
1967	Thiruvarutchelvar	Ulagamellam	K. V. Mahadevan		
1967	Thiruvarutchelvar	Panninar Mozhiyaal	K. V. Mahadevan		
1968	En Thambi	Thattattum Kai	M. S. Viswanathan		
1968	En Thambi	Muthu Nagaiye	M. S. Viswanathan		
1968	En Thambi	Muthu Nagaiye (Pathos Version)	M. S. Viswanathan		
1968	En Thambi	Ayyaiya Mella	M. S. Viswanathan		
1968	En Thambi	Munthi Mundhi Vinayagane	M. S. Viswanathan		
1968	En Thambi	Adiyai Netru Pirandhaval	M. S. Viswanathan		
1968	Enga Oor Raja	Athaikku Mesai	M. S. Viswanathan		
1968	Enga Oor Raja	Yaarai Nambi Naan	M. S. Viswanathan		
1968	Enga Oor Raja	Ennadi Pappa	M. S. Viswanathan		
1968	Enga Oor Raja	Parameshwari	M. S. Viswanathan		
1968	Enga Oor Raja	Yezhu Kadal Seemai	M. S. Viswanathan		
1968	Kuzhanthaikkaga	Raman Enbathu Sindhu	M. S. Viswanathan	National Film Award for Best Lyrics	
1968	Kuzhanthaikkaga	Thaimadha Megam adhu	M. S. Viswanathan		
1968	Kuzhanthaikkaga	Thottu Paarungal	M. S. Viswanathan		
1968	Kuzhanthaikkaga	Thaimadha Megan -2	M. S. Viswanathan		
1968	Lakshmi Kalyanam	Brindhavanathukku	M. S. Viswanathan	Tamil Nadu State Film Award for Best Lyricist	
1968	Lakshmi Kalyanam	Raman Ethanai Ramanadi	M. S. Viswanathan	Sindhu Bhairavi	
1968	Lakshmi Kalyanam	Yaaradaa Manithan	M. S. Viswanathan		
1968	Lakshmi Kalyanam	Thanga Thearodum	M. S. Viswanathan		
1968	Lakshmi Kalyanam	Poottale Unnaiyum	M. S. Viswanathan		
1968	Lakshmi Kalyanam	Pooti Vaitha Kovilile	M. S. Viswanathan		
1968	Moondrezhuthu	Pettiyile Pottadaitha	T. K. Ramamoorthy		
1968	Moondrezhuthu	Kadhalan Vanthan	T. K. Ramamoorthy		
1968	Moondrezhuthu	Aadu Paarkkalam	T. K. Ramamoorthy		
1968	Moondrezhuthu	Iravil Vandha	T. K. Ramamoorthy		
1968	Moondrezhuthu	Konjum Kili	T. K. Ramamoorthy		
1968	Moondrezhuthu	Pachai Kili	T. K. Ramamoorthy		
1968	Neelagiri Express	Naan Kavingnan Alla	T. K. Ramamoorthy		
1968	Neelagiri Express	Kalyana Pennai	T. K. Ramamoorthy		
1968	Neelagiri Express	Thiruthani Muruga	T. K. Ramamoorthy		
1968	Neelagiri Express	Valibam Oru Velli	T. K. Ramamoorthy		
1968	Neelagiri Express	Kadavul Madhuvai	T. K. Ramamoorthy		
1968	Panama Pasama	Mella Mella Mella	K. V. Mahadevan		
1968	Panama Pasama	Maariyathu Nenjam	K. V. Mahadevan		
1968	Panama Pasama	Ezhandha Pazham	K. V. Mahadevan		
1968	Panama Pasama	Vaazhaithandu Pola (Alek)	K. V. Mahadevan		
1968	Panama Pasama	Chinnachiru Veedu	K. V. Mahadevan		
1968	Pudhiya Bhoomi	Chinna Valai Mugam	M. S. Viswanathan		
1968	Pudhiya Bhoomi	Vizhiye Vizhiye	M. S. Viswanathan		
1968	Pudhiya Bhoomi	Nethiyile Pottu	M. S. Viswanathan		
1968	Ragasiya Police 115	Kanne Kaniye	M. S. Viswanathan		
1968	Ragasiya Police 115	Santhanam Kungumam	M. S. Viswanathan		
1968	Ragasiya Police 115	Kannil Therigindra	M. S. Viswanathan		
1968	Ragasiya Police 115	Enna Porutham	M. S. Viswanathan		
1968	Ragasiya Police 115	Unnai Yenni Yenni	M. S. Viswanathan		
1968	Thillana Mohanambal	Maraindhirundhu Paarkkum	K. V. Mahadevan	Shanmukhapriya	
1968	Thillana Mohanambal	Nalam Thaana Nalam	K. V. Mahadevan	Neelamani and Shivaranjani	
1968	Thillana Mohanambal	Pandiyan Naanirukka	K. V. Mahadevan		
1968	Thillana Mohanambal	Nadhaswaram Bit	K. V. Mahadevan		
1968	Thirumal Perumai	Gopiyar Konjum Ramana	K. V. Mahadevan		
1968	Thirumal Perumai	Hari Hari Gokula	K. V. Mahadevan		
1968	Thirumal Perumai	Kannanukkum Kalvanukkum	K. V. Mahadevan		
1968	Thirumal Perumai	Kanna Kanna Kaviya	K. V. Mahadevan		
1968	Thirumal Perumai	Malargaliley Pala	K. V. Mahadevan		
1968	Thirumal Perumai	Thirumal Perumaikku	K. V. Mahadevan	Madhyamavati	
1968	Thirumal Perumai	Karaiyeri Meen Vilaiyaadum	K. V. Mahadevan		
1969	Aayiram Poi	Kaviri Thanneeyil	V. Kumar		
1969	Aayiram Poi	Pulavar Sonnathum	V. Kumar		
1969	Aayiram Poi	Thillaiyile Sabapathy	V. Kumar		
1969	Aayiram Poi	Thamizh Vidu Thoodhu	V. Kumar		
1969	Kanne Pappa	Kanne Pappa En	M. S. Viswanathan		
1969	Kanne Pappa	Thendralil Aadai	M. S. Viswanathan		
1969	Kanne Pappa	Kanne Pappa (Pathos)	M. S. Viswanathan		
1969	Kanne Pappa	Kaalathil Idhu Nalla	M. S. Viswanathan		
1969	Kanne Pappa	Sathiya Muthirai	M. S. Viswanathan		
1969	Kanne Pappa	Chippikkul Pani Vizhundhu	M. S. Viswanathan		
1969	Deiva Magan	Deivame Deivame Nandri	M. S. Viswanathan		
1969	Deiva Magan	Kadal Malar Kootam	M. S. Viswanathan		
1969	Deiva Magan	Anbulla Nanbare	M. S. Viswanathan		
1969	Deiva Magan	Kaathalikka Katrukollungal	M. S. Viswanathan		
1969	Deiva Magan	Koottathileya Yarthan	M. S. Viswanathan		
1969	Deiva Magan	Kettadhum Koduppavane Krishna	M. S. Viswanathan		
1969	Deiva Magan	Kangal Pesuthamma	M. S. Viswanathan		
1969	Anbalippu	"Theru Vanthathu Pol"	M. S. Viswanathan		
1969	Anbalippu	"En Vesha Porutham"	M. S. Viswanathan		
1969	Anbalippu	"Gopalan Enge Undo"	M. S. Viswanathan		
1969	Anbalippu	"Vallimalai Maankutty"	M. S. Viswanathan		
1969	Anbalippu	"Yeai Ennaku Therium"	M. S. Viswanathan		
1969	Anbalippu	"Madhulam Pazhathukku"	M. S. Viswanathan		
1969	Shanthi Nilayam	Iravian Varuvaan	M. S. Viswanathan		
1969	Shanthi Nilayam	Iyarkai Enum	M. S. Viswanathan		
1969	Shanthi Nilayam	Boomiyil Iruppathum	M. S. Viswanathan		
1969	Shanthi Nilayam	Kadavul Orunaal	M. S. Viswanathan		
1969	Shanthi Nilayam	Selvangale	M. S. Viswanathan		
1969	Shanthi Nilayam	Pennai Paarthum	M. S. Viswanathan		
1969	Shanthi Nilayam	Kangal Theduvathu	M. S. Viswanathan		
1969	Sivandha Mann	Paarvai Yuvarani	M. S. Viswanathan		
1969	Sivandha Mann	Oru Raja Raniyidam	M. S. Viswanathan		
1969	Sivandha Mann	Pattathu Rani	M. S. Viswanathan		
1969	Sivandha Mann	Oru Naalile	M. S. Viswanathan		
1969	Sivandha Mann	Sollavo Sugamana	M. S. Viswanathan		
1969	Sivandha Mann	Muthamidum Neram	M. S. Viswanathan		
1969	Sivandha Mann	Anandhamaga	M. S. Viswanathan		
1969	Sivandha Mann	Amma Un Maganodu	M. S. Viswanathan		
1969	Sivandha Mann	Thangamani Panikiliyum	M. S. Viswanathan		
1969	Thirudan	Pazhaniyappan Pazhaniyamma	M. S. Viswanathan		
1969	Thirudan	Kottai Mathilmele	M. S. Viswanathan		
1969	Thirudan	En Aasai Ennodu	M. S. Viswanathan		
1969	Thirudan	Ninaithapadi Kidaithathadi	M. S. Viswanathan		
1969	Kuzhandai Ullam	"Angum Ingum Ondre"	S. P. Kodandapani		
1969	Kuzhandai Ullam	"Muthu Chippikkulle"	S. P. Kodandapani		
1969	Kuzhandai Ullam	"Poomarathu Nizhalumundu"	S. P. Kodandapani		
1969	Kuzhandai Ullam	"Kudagu Naadu Ponni"	S. P. Kodandapani		
1969	Nirai Kudam	"Deva Deva"	V. Kumar		
1969	Nirai Kudam	"Kannoru Pakkam"	V. Kumar		
1969	Nirai Kudam	"Vilakke Nee Konda"	V. Kumar		

=== 1970s ===
Year	Movie	Songs	Music director	Note	Ref(s)
1970	CID Shankar	Naanathalie Kannam	Vedha		
1970	CID Shankar	Brindavanthil Pooveduthu	Vedha		
1970	CID Shankar	Paattu Thikkuthadi	Vedha		
1970	CID Shankar	Antha Araiyinile Oru	Vedha		
1970	CID Shankar	Thipoosa Thirunaalile	Vedha		
1970	En Annan	Kondai Oru Pakkam	K. V. Mahadevan		
1970	En Annan	Neela Niram Vaanukkum	K. V. Mahadevan		
1970	En Annan	Aasai Irukku Nenjil	K. V. Mahadevan		
1970	En Annan	Kadavul Yen Kallanar	K. V. Mahadevan		
1970	En Annan	Nenjam Undu Nermai	K. V. Mahadevan		
1970	En Annan	Aayiram Ennam Undu	K. V. Mahadevan		
1970	Enga Mama	"Naan Thannanthani"	M. S. Viswanathan		
1970	Enga Mama	"Sorgam Pakkathil"	M. S. Viswanathan		
1970	Enga Mama	"Chellakkiligalam Palliley"	M. S. Viswanathan		
1970	Enga Mama	"Chellakkiligalam Palliley" (Sad Version)	M. S. Viswanathan		
1970	Enga Mama	"Ellorum Nalam Vaazha"	M. S. Viswanathan		
1970	Engirundho Vandhaal	Ore Paadal Unnai	M. S. Viswanathan		
1970	Engirundho Vandhaal	Sirippil Undagum Ragathile	M. S. Viswanathan		
1970	Engirundho Vandhaal	Naan Unnai Azhaikkavillai	M. S. Viswanathan		
1970	Engirundho Vandhaal	Hello My Darling	M. S. Viswanathan		
1970	Engirundho Vandhaal	Vandhavargal Vazhga	M. S. Viswanathan		
1970	Engirundho Vandhaal	Sakunthalai Dhushyanthan	M. S. Viswanathan		
1970	Engirundho Vandhaal	Naan Unnai Azhaikkavillai - Bit	M. S. Viswanathan		
1970	Kaaviya Thalaivi	Kaiyodu Kai serukkum	M. S. Viswanathan		
1970	Kaaviya Thalaivi	Oru Naal Iravil	M. S. Viswanathan		
1970	Kaaviya Thalaivi	Arambam Indre Agattum	M. S. Viswanathan		
1970	Kaaviya Thalaivi	En Vaanathil Aayiram	M. S. Viswanathan		
1970	Kaaviya Thalaivi	Nerana Nedusalaiyil	M. S. Viswanathan		
1970	Kaaviya Thalaivi	Penn Paartha Mappillai	M. S. Viswanathan		
1970	Kaaviya Thalaivi	Kavithaiyil Ezhuthiya	M. S. Viswanathan		
1970	Raman Ethanai Ramanadi	Ammaadi Ponnukku	M. S. Viswanathan		
1970	Raman Ethanai Ramanadi	Ammaadi Ponnukku(sad)	M. S. Viswanathan		
1970	Raman Ethanai Ramanadi	Nilavu Vandhu	M. S. Viswanathan		
1970	Raman Ethanai Ramanadi	Chithirai Maadham	M. S. Viswanathan		
1970	Raman Ethanai Ramanadi	Chera Chozha Pandiyar	M. S. Viswanathan		
1970	Sorgam	Oru Mutharathil	M. S. Viswanathan		
1970	Sorgam	Azhagu Mugam	M. S. Viswanathan		
1970	Sorgam	Sollathe Yaarum Kettaal	M. S. Viswanathan		
1970	Sorgam	Naalu Kaalu Sir	M. S. Viswanathan		
1970	Thedi Vandha Mappillai	Aadatha Ullagal	M. S. Viswanathan		
1970	Thedi Vandha Mappillai	Idamo Sugamanathu	M. S. Viswanathan		
1970	Thedi Vandha Mappillai	Maanikkka Theril Maragatha	M. S. Viswanathan		
1970	Vietnam Veedu	Paalakattu Pakkathile	K. V. Mahadevan		
1970	Vietnam Veedu	Un Kannil Neer	K. V. Mahadevan		
1970	Vietnam Veedu	Oh My Lady	K. V. Mahadevan		
1970	Vietnam Veedu	Endrum Pudhidhaga	K. V. Mahadevan		
1971	Sabatham	"Aadum Alaigalil Neethi" (Mahabharatham)	G. K. Venkatesh		
1971	Sabatham	"Thoduvathenna Thendralo"	G. K. Venkatesh		
1971	Sabatham	"Nenjukku Neethi Undu"	G. K. Venkatesh		
1971	Sabatham	"Aattathai Aadu Puliyudan"	G. K. Venkatesh		
1971	Thangaikkaaga	Thaayin Mugam	M. S. Viswanathan		
1971	Thangaikkaaga	Unnai Thedi Varum	M. S. Viswanathan		
1971	Thangaikkaaga	Azhage Nee Oru	M. S. Viswanathan		
1971	Thangaikkaaga	Angamuththu	M. S. Viswanathan		
1971	Thangaikkaaga	Velli Kizhamai	M. S. Viswanathan		
1971	Thangaikkaaga	Yedhaiyum Thanguven	M. S. Viswanathan		
1971	Moondru Deivangal	Then Mazhaiyile Mangani	M. S. Viswanathan		
1971	Moondru Deivangal	Thirupathi Sendru Thirumbi Vandhaal	M. S. Viswanathan		
1971	Moondru Deivangal	Mullilla Roja	M. S. Viswanathan		
1971	Moondru Deivangal	Thai Enum Selvangal	M. S. Viswanathan		
1971	Moondru Deivangal	Nee Oru Chellapillai	M. S. Viswanathan		
1971	Moondru Deivangal	Nadappadhu Sugam	M. S. Viswanathan		
1971	Moondru Deivangal	Vasanthathil Orr Naal	M. S. Viswanathan		
1971	Aathi Parasakthi	Aayi Mahamayi	K. V. Mahadevan		
1971	Aathi Parasakthi	Solladi Abhirami	K. V. Mahadevan		
1971	Aathi Parasakthi	Naan Atchi Seithuvarum	K. V. Mahadevan		
1971	Aathi Parasakthi	Azhagaga Kannukku	K. V. Mahadevan		
1971	Aathi Parasakthi	Varugavae Varugavae	K. V. Mahadevan		
1971	Aathi Parasakthi	Aathadi Maariyamma	K. V. Mahadevan		
1971	Aathi Parasakthi	Thanthaikku Manthirathai	K. V. Mahadevan		
1971	Aathi Parasakthi	Kokku Parakum	K. V. Mahadevan		
1971	Uttharavindri Ulle Vaa	Utharavindri Ulle Vaa	M. S. Viswanathan		
1971	Uttharavindri Ulle Vaa	Madhamo Aavani Mangaiyo	M. S. Viswanathan		
1971	Uttharavindri Ulle Vaa	Unnai Thoduvathu Iniyathu	M. S. Viswanathan		
1971	Uttharavindri Ulle Vaa	Kaadhal Kaadhal Endru Pesa	M. S. Viswanathan		
1971	Uttharavindri Ulle Vaa	Theanaatrangaraiyinile	M. S. Viswanathan		
1971	Kumari Kottam	Vanthaan Aaiyah	M. S. Viswanathan		
1972	Nalla Neram	Nee Thottal	K. V. Mahadevan		
1972	Nalla Neram	Tick Tick	K. V. Mahadevan		
1972	Deivam	Maruthamalai Maamaniye	Kunnakudi Vaidyanathan		
1972	Deivam	Naadariyum 100 Malai Naan Ariven	Kunnakudi Vaidyanathan		
1972	Deivam	Varuvaandi Tharuvandi Malaiyandi	Kunnakudi Vaidyanathan		
1972	Deivam	Thiruchendoorin Kadalorathil	Kunnakudi Vaidyanathan		
1972	Deivam	Kundrathile Kumaranukku Kondattam	Kunnakudi Vaidyanathan		
1972	Deivam	Thiruchendooril Por Purindhu	Kunnakudi Vaidyanathan		
1972	Gnana Oli	Amma Kannu Summa	M. S. Viswanathan		
1972	Gnana Oli	Manamedai Malargaludan	M. S. Viswanathan		
1972	Gnana Oli	Devane Ennai	M. S. Viswanathan		
1972	Raman Thediya Seethai	En Ullam Unthan	M. S. Viswanathan		
1972	Raman Thediya Seethai	Nalladhu Kanne	M. S. Viswanathan		
1972	Raman Thediya Seethai	Thiruvalar Selviye	M. S. Viswanathan		
1972	Raja	"Kalayana Ponnu"	M. S. Viswanathan		
1972	Raja	"Gangaiyile"	M. S. Viswanathan		
1972	Raja	"Irandil Ondru"	M. S. Viswanathan		
1972	Raja	"Naan Uyirukku Tharuvatu"	M. S. Viswanathan		
1972	Raja	"Nee Vara Vendum"	M. S. Viswanathan		
1972	Vasantha Maligai	O Maanida Jaathiye	K. V. Mahadevan		
1972	Vasantha Maligai	Oru Kinnathai	K. V. Mahadevan		
1972	Vasantha Maligai	Kudimagane	K. V. Mahadevan		
1972	Vasantha Maligai	Kalaimagal Kai Porule	K. V. Mahadevan		
1972	Vasantha Maligai	Adiyamma Rajathi	K. V. Mahadevan		
1972	Vasantha Maligai	Mayakkamenna	K. V. Mahadevan		
1972	Vasantha Maligai	Irandu Manam	K. V. Mahadevan		
1972	Vasantha Maligai	Yaarukkaga	K. V. Mahadevan		
1972	Shakthi Leelai	Sakthi Vandhaladi	T. K. Ramamoorthy		
1972	Shakthi Leelai	Ambikai Nadagam Akilam	T. K. Ramamoorthy		
1972	Shakthi Leelai	Malargal Enge	T. K. Ramamoorthy		
1972	Shakthi Leelai	Unnai Thaan Paarthen	T. K. Ramamoorthy		
1972	Shakthi Leelai	Kalai Pozhuthe Varuga	T. K. Ramamoorthy		
1972	Shakthi Leelai	Thannai Vendravan Yaarum	T. K. Ramamoorthy		
1972	Shakthi Leelai	Mullai Poo Pole Pillai	T. K. Ramamoorthy		
1972	Shakthi Leelai	Urangak Koodaathu Kanne	T. K. Ramamoorthy		
1972	Shakthi Leelai	Engum Deivam	T. K. Ramamoorthy		
1972	Shakthi Leelai	Sakthi Ennum Deivam	T. K. Ramamoorthy		
1973	Rajapart Rangadurai	Ammamma Avan	M. S. Viswanathan		
1973	Rajapart Rangadurai	Madhana Maaligaiyil	M. S. Viswanathan		
1973	Rajapart Rangadurai	Chinchikkuka Chinna	M. S. Viswanathan		
1973	Rajapart Rangadurai	Meiyadha Maan	M. S. Viswanathan		
1973	Rajapart Rangadurai	Vandhean Vanthanam	M. S. Viswanathan		
1973	Rajapart Rangadurai	Inquilab Zindabad	M. S. Viswanathan		
1973	Rajapart Rangadurai	Ammamma (Pathos)	M. S. Viswanathan		
1973	Thirumalai Deivam	Malai Manivanna Mayavane	Kunnakudi Vaidyanathan		
1973	Thirumalai Deivam	Neela Nira Megam	Kunnakudi Vaidyanathan		
1973	Thirumalai Deivam	Varum Naal Ellam	Kunnakudi Vaidyanathan		
1973	Ulagam Sutrum Valiban	Aval Oru Navarasa	M. S. Viswanathan		
1973	Ulagam Sutrum Valiban	Lilly Malarukku	M. S. Viswanathan		
1973	Ulagam Sutrum Valiban	Pachchaikili	M. S. Viswanathan		
1973	Ulagam Sutrum Valiban	Ulagam Ulagam	M. S. Viswanathan		
1973	Rajaraja Cholan	Thendraloodu	Kunnakudi Vaidyanathan		
1973	Rajaraja Cholan	Thanjai Periya	Kunnakudi Vaidyanathan		
1973	Rajaraja Cholan	Yedu Thanthaanadi	Kunnakudi Vaidyanathan		
1973	Karaikkal Ammaiyar	Ulagamengum	Kunnakudi Vaidyanathan		
1973	Karaikkal Ammaiyar	Nayagan Vadivai	Kunnakudi Vaidyanathan		
1973	Karaikkal Ammaiyar	Anbe Sivam Endru	Kunnakudi Vaidyanathan		
1973	Karaikkal Ammaiyar	Vaduvatha Or Pozhuthum	Kunnakudi Vaidyanathan		
1973	Karaikkal Ammaiyar	Padukiren Unnai	Kunnakudi Vaidyanathan		
1973	Karaikkal Ammaiyar	Piravatha Varam Vendum	Kunnakudi Vaidyanathan		
1973	Karaikkal Ammaiyar	Thaka Thaka Thakavena Aadava	Kunnakudi Vaidyanathan		
1973	Suryagandhi	Paramasivan Kazhuthil	M. S. Viswanathan		
1973	Arangetram	Aandavanin Thottathile	V. Kumar		
1973	Arangetram	Kannanidam Endhan Karutthinai	V. Kumar		
1973	Arangetram	Moothaval Nee	V. Kumar		
1973	Arangetram	Aaramba Kaalaththil	V. Kumar		
1973	Arangetram	Kannanai Kaanbadharko	V. Kumar		
1973	Arangetram	Mappilai Ragasiyam	V. Kumar		
1973	Arangetram	Enadi Marumagale Unnai Evaradi Pesivittaar	V. Kumar		
1973	Arangetram	Kannaarkkum Katravarum	V. Kumar		
1973	Arangetram	Paaviye Kanda Vannam	V. Kumar		
1973	Arangetram	Srimaathaa Srimaha	V. Kumar		
1973	Arangetram	Agara Mudaka Nagurasa	V. Kumar		
1974	Naan Avanillai	Engirundho Vandhaal	M. S. Viswanathan		
1974	Naan Avanillai	Radha Kadhal Varadha	M. S. Viswanathan		
1974	Naan Avanillai	Manthaara Malare	M. S. Viswanathan		
1974	Naan Avanillai	Naan Chinna Chiru	M. S. Viswanathan		
1974	Naan Avanillai	Inge Naan	M. S. Viswanathan		
1974	En Magan	Neengal Athanai Perum	M. S. Viswanathan		
1974	En Magan	Ponnukkenna Azhagu	M. S. Viswanathan		
1974	En Magan	Neengal Athanai Perum (Sad)	M. S. Viswanathan		
1974	En Magan	Sollathe Sollathe	M. S. Viswanathan		
1974	En Magan	Sone Pappidi	M. S. Viswanathan		
1974	Urimaikural	Ambilaingala Neenga	M. S. Viswanathan		
1974	Urimaikural	Vizhiye Kadhai Ezhudhu	M. S. Viswanathan		
1974	Netru Indru Naalai	"Innoru Vaanam" (Romeo)	M. S. Viswanathan		
1974	Vani Rani	Kaalamellam Parthathundu	K. V. Mahadevan		
1974	Vani Rani	Bhoomiyil Thendral	K. V. Mahadevan		
1974	Vani Rani	Mullaipoo Pallakku	K. V. Mahadevan		
1974	Vani Rani	Parthu Po	K. V. Mahadevan		
1974	Vani Rani	Kathai Undu	K. V. Mahadevan		
1974	Vani Rani	Pon Olirum Pudhu Nilave	K. V. Mahadevan		
1974	Panathukkaga	Sangeetham Eppothum Sugamanathu	M. S. Viswanathan		
1974	Panathukkaga	Yaarumillai Ingey	M. S. Viswanathan		
1974	Panathukkaga	Mounam Ingey	M. S. Viswanathan		
1974	Thangappathakkam	Sothanai Mel Sothanai	M. S. Viswanathan		
1974	Thangappathakkam	Thatti Sellum	M. S. Viswanathan		
1974	Thangappathakkam	Nallathoru Kudumbam	M. S. Viswanathan		
1974	Thangappathakkam	Sumaithangi Saaithal	M. S. Viswanathan		
1974	Aval Oru Thodar Kathai	Adi Ennadi Ulagam	M. S. Viswanathan		
1974	Aval Oru Thodar Kathai	En Manam Enna	M. S. Viswanathan		
1974	Aval Oru Thodar Kathai	Deivam Thandha Veedu	M. S. Viswanathan		
1974	Aval Oru Thodar Kathai	Kadavul Amaithu Vaitha	M. S. Viswanathan		
1974	Aval Oru Thodar Kathai	Aadumadi Thottil	M. S. Viswanathan		
1975	Avandhan Manidhan	Jalitha Vanitha	M. S. Viswanathan		
1975	Avandhan Manidhan	Engirundho Oru Kural	M. S. Viswanathan		
1975	Avandhan Manidhan	Aattu Vithaar Yaar	M. S. Viswanathan		
1975	Avandhan Manidhan	Anbu Nadamaadum	M. S. Viswanathan		
1975	Avandhan Manidhan	Manithan Ninaipathundu	M. S. Viswanathan		
1975	Cinema Paithiyam	En Ullam Azhagana	M. S. Viswanathan		
1975	Cinema Paithiyam	Naan Ariyatha	M. S. Viswanathan		
1975	Cinema Paithiyam	I Will Sell My Beauty	M. S. Viswanathan		
1975	Thiruvarul	Engum Thirinthu	Kunnakudi Vaidyanathan		
1975	Thiruvarul	Kandhan Kaaladiyai	Kunnakudi Vaidyanathan		
1975	Thiruvarul	Kandukondain	Kunnakudi Vaidyanathan		
1975	Thiruvarul	Maalai Vanna Maalai	Kunnakudi Vaidyanathan		
1975	Thiruvarul	Malaigalil Sirantha	Kunnakudi Vaidyanathan		
1975	Thiruvarul	Marudha Malai	Kunnakudi Vaidyanathan		
1975	Thiruvarul	Maruthamalaikku	Kunnakudi Vaidyanathan		
1975	Thiruvarul	Thangam Perithendru	Kunnakudi Vaidyanathan		
1975	Thiruvarul	Ulagangal Yaavum	Kunnakudi Vaidyanathan		
1975	Apoorva Raagangal	Athisaya Raagam	M. S. Viswanathan		
1975	Apoorva Raagangal	Kai Kotti Siripaargal	M. S. Viswanathan		
1975	Apoorva Raagangal	Kelviyin Nayagane	M. S. Viswanathan		
1975	Apoorva Raagangal	Yezhu Swarangalukkul	M. S. Viswanathan		
1976	Ore Thanthai	Adiyungal Valikkaathu	Shankar–Ganesh		
1976	Ore Thanthai	Maanicka Ther	Shankar–Ganesh		
1976	Ore Thanthai	Ammadiyo	Shankar–Ganesh		
1976	Ore Thanthai	Poochendu	Shankar–Ganesh		
1976	Uthaman	Kanavugale Kanavugale	K. V. Mahadevan		
1976	Uthaman	Devan Vandhandi	K. V. Mahadevan		
1976	Uthaman	Hari Om Ranga	K. V. Mahadevan		
1976	Uthaman	Kelaai Magane	K. V. Mahadevan		
1976	Uthaman	Padagu Padagu	K. V. Mahadevan		
1976	Uthaman	Naalai Naalai	K. V. Mahadevan		
1976	Uthaman	Naalai Naalai (Pathos)	K. V. Mahadevan		
1976	Manmadha Leelai	"Manaivi Amaivathellam"	M. S. Viswanathan		
1976	Manmadha Leelai	"Naathamenum"	M. S. Viswanathan		
1976	Manmadha Leelai	"Hello My Dear Wrong Number"	M. S. Viswanathan		
1976	Manmadha Leelai	"Manmadha"	M. S. Viswanathan		
1976	Manmadha Leelai	"Netru Oru Menagai"	M. S. Viswanathan		
1976	Manmadha Leelai	"Sugam Thanaa"	M. S. Viswanathan		
1976	Moondru Mudichu	Aadi Velli	M. S. Viswanathan		
1976	Moondru Mudichu	Naanoru Kadhanayagi	M. S. Viswanathan		
1976	Moondru Mudichu	Vasantha Kaala	M. S. Viswanathan		
1977	Sri Krishna Leela	Kaami Sathyabama	S. V. Venkatraman		
1977	Avargal	Angum Ingum	M. S. Viswanathan		
1977	Avargal	Gangaiyile Neer	M. S. Viswanathan		
1977	Avargal	Ippadiyor Thalattu	M. S. Viswanathan		
1977	Avargal	Junior Junior	M. S. Viswanathan		
1977	Avargal	Kaatrukkenna Veli	M. S. Viswanathan		
1977	16 Vayathinile	Aattukkutti	Ilaiyaraaja		
1977	16 Vayathinile	Chavanthi Poo	Ilaiyaraaja		
1978	Kizhakke Pogum Rail	Kovil Mani Osai	Ilaiyaraaja		
1978	Andaman Kadhali	Panamennada	M. S. Viswanathan		
1978	Andaman Kadhali	Ninaivaale	M. S. Viswanathan		
1978	Andaman Kadhali	Adi Leela	M. S. Viswanathan		
1978	Andaman Kadhali	Antha Maanai	M. S. Viswanathan		
1978	Sattam En Kaiyil	Sorgam Madhuvile	Ilaiyaraaja		
1978	Sattam En Kaiyil	Ore Idam	Ilaiyaraaja		
1978	Sattam En Kaiyil	Kadai Thengaiyo	Ilaiyaraaja		
1978	Sattam En Kaiyil	Mera Naam Abdullah	Ilaiyaraaja		
1978	Sattam En Kaiyil	Aazhakadalil	Ilaiyaraaja		
1978	Sigappu Rojakkal	Minminikku Kannil Oru	Ilaiyaraaja		
1978	Nizhal Nijamagiradhu	"Kamban Emandhaan"	M. S. Viswanathan		
1978	Nizhal Nijamagiradhu	"Ilakanam Maarudho"	M. S. Viswanathan		
1979	Thirisoolam	Malar Koduththen	M. S. Viswanathan		
1979	Thirisoolam	Kadhal Rani Katti Kidakae	M. S. Viswanathan		
1979	Thirisoolam	En Raajathi	M. S. Viswanathan		
1979	Thirisoolam	Irandu Kaigal	M. S. Viswanathan		
1979	Thirisoolam	Thirumaalin Thirumarbil	M. S. Viswanathan		
1979	Velum Mayilum Thunai	Aatharam Neeye Ganapathy	Shankar-Ganesh		
1979	Velum Mayilum Thunai	Ichai Kiliyendru	Shankar-Ganesh		
1979	Ninaithale Inikkum	Namma Ooru Singaari	M. S. Viswanathan		
1979	Ninaithale Inikkum	Sayonara Vesham Kalainthathu	M. S. Viswanathan		
1979	Ninaithale Inikkum	Nizhal Kandavan	M. S. Viswanathan		
1979	Ninaithale Inikkum	Ninaiththaale Inikkum	M. S. Viswanathan		
1979	Ninaithale Inikkum	Vaaniley Medai Amaithu	M. S. Viswanathan		
1979	Ninaithale Inikkum	Aananda Thaandavamo	M. S. Viswanathan		
1979	Ninaithale Inikkum	Bharathi Kannamma	M. S. Viswanathan		
1979	Ninaithale Inikkum	Inimai Nirandha Ulagam	M. S. Viswanathan		
1979	Ninaithale Inikkum	Kaaththirunthem	M. S. Viswanathan		
1979	Ninaithale Inikkum	Sambo Sivasambo	M. S. Viswanathan		
1979	Ninaithale Inikkum	Thattiketka Aalillai	M. S. Viswanathan		
1979	Ninaithale Inikkum	Yaathum Oore	M. S. Viswanathan		
1979	Ninaithale Inikkum	Engeyum Eppothum	M. S. Viswanathan		
1979	Neeya?	Ore Jeevan	Shankar–Ganesh		
1979	Neeya?	Ore Jeevan (pathos)	Shankar–Ganesh		
1979	Veettukku Veedu Vasappadi	all songs	Rajan-Nagendra		

=== 1980s ===
Year	Movie	Songs	Music director	Note	Ref(s)
1980	Rishi Moolam	Neramithu Neramidhu	Ilaiyaraaja		
1980	Rishi Moolam	Vaada En	Ilaiyaraaja		
1980	Rishi Moolam	Mazhai Varuvathu	Ilaiyaraaja		
1980	Rishi Moolam	Aymbathilum Aasai	Ilaiyaraaja		
1980	Rishi Moolam	Nenjil Ulla	Ilaiyaraaja		
1980	Rishi Moolam	Maamanukku	Ilaiyaraaja		
1980	Johnny	En Vaaniley	Ilaiyaraaja		
1980	Billa	My Name Is Billa	M. S. Viswanathan		
1980	Billa	Iravum Pagalum	M. S. Viswanathan		
1980	Billa	Veththalaya Pottendi	M. S. Viswanathan		
1980	Billa	Nattukulla Enakkoru	M. S. Viswanathan		
1980	Billa	Ninaithale Inikkum Sugame	M. S. Viswanathan		
1980	Polladhavan	Naan Polladhavan	M. S. Viswanathan		
1980	Polladhavan	Chinnakkannane	M. S. Viswanathan		
1980	Polladhavan	Atho Vaarandi	M. S. Viswanathan		
1980	Polladhavan	Naanae Endrum Raja	M. S. Viswanathan		
1981	Andha 7 Naatkal	"Swararaaga"	M. S. Viswanathan		
1981	Andha 7 Naatkal	"Thendraladhu Unnidathil"	M. S. Viswanathan		
1981	Thee	Subbanna Sonnaranna	M. S. Viswanathan		
1981	Thee	Vaare Vaa Ishu	M. S. Viswanathan		
1981	Thee	Ayyavukku Manasu Irukku	M. S. Viswanathan		
1981	Thillu Mullu	Raagangal Pathinaaru	M. S. Viswanathan		
1981	Thillu Mullu	Thillu Mullu	M. S. Viswanathan		
1981	Thillu Mullu	Thangangale Thambigale	M. S. Viswanathan		
1981	Thillu Mullu	Andhe Neram	M. S. Viswanathan		
1981	Netrikkan	Raja Rani	Ilaiyaraaja		
1981	Netrikkan	Theeratha	Ilaiyaraaja		
1981	Netrikkan	Ramanin Mohanam	Ilaiyaraaja		
1981	Netrikkan	Mappillaikku	Ilaiyaraaja		
1982	Pokkiri Raja	Kadavul Padachan	M. S. Viswanathan		
1982	Pokkiri Raja	Vidiya Vidiya Solli	M. S. Viswanathan		
1982	Moondram Pirai	Poongatru Puthidhanathu	Ilaiyaraaja		
1982	Moondram Pirai	Kanne Kalaimaane	Ilaiyaraaja	Last song	

=== Re-used songs ===
Year	Movie	Songs	Music director	Note	Ref(s)
2023	Kolai	"Paartha Gnaabagam Illaiyo"	Girishh G.		
