= Galatta Kalyanam =

1968 film by C. V. Rajendran

- Poster
- Directed by: C. V. Rajendran
- Written by: Gopu
- Based on: Galatta Kalyanam by Gopu and Sridhar
- Produced by: Sivaji Ganesan
- Starring: Sivaji Ganesan; Jayalalithaa
- Cinematography: P. N. Sundaram
- Edited by: N. M. Shankar
- Music by: M. S. Viswanathan
- Production company: Ramkumar Films
- Release date: 12 April 1968
- Running time: 148 minutes
- Country: India
- Language: Tamil

Galatta Kalyanam (transl. Riotous Marriage) is a 1968 Indian Tamil-language romantic comedy film directed by C. V. Rajendran and written by Gopu. The film stars Sivaji Ganesan and Jayalalithaa. It is based on Gopu and Sridhar's play of the same name. The film, released on 12 April 1968, was remade in Malayalam as Snehikkan Samayamilla (1978) and in Kannada as Aliya Devaru (1979).

== Plot ==
Madan and Lalitha are in love. Lalitha is the second daughter of a businessman, Dharmalingam. While seeking her hand in marriage, Dharmalingam lays down a condition that all his daughters' weddings are to be held simultaneously, thereby entrusting Madan with the unenviable task of finding suitable grooms for his other daughters. Madan seeks the help of his friend, Chandran in his mission. Madan, however, soon realises that he has a Herculean task ahead of him – the eldest daughter Rathna is averse to marriage. The others have their own tastes and preferences. After encountering a lot of difficulties, they manage to find grooms for all of them. However, on the wedding eve, one of the grooms goes missing. After tracing the gang, Madan fights them to rescue the groom and finally all pairs get married.

== Cast ==
Actors

- Sivaji Ganesan as Madhan
- A. V. M. Rajan as Mohan
- Nagesh as Chandran
- Cho as Vittal
- K. A. Thangavelu as Dharmalingam
- V. S. Raghavan as Masilamani
- Mali as Gangster
- V. Gopalakrishnan as Gopi (a) Gopalakrishnan
- Senthamarai as Jambu

Actresses

- Jayalalithaa as Lalitha
- Jyothi Lakshmi as Kanchana
- Manorama as Rathna
- Kumari Sachu as Kantha
- Rajeswari as Sarasa
- Sundari Bai as Devi
- Seethalakshmi as Lakshmi
- Deva Manohari as Jaya

== Production ==
Galatta Kalyanam was the adaptation of a play written by Gopu, which was staged in a star night organised for donations during the Sino-Indian War of 1962. Gopu completed the script within two days. After seeing the positive response the play received, Ganesan expressed interest in adapting the play into a feature film. This was the first film which had Gopu working outside the banner of Chithralaya and the film was directed by Sridhar's cousin C. V. Rajendran. It is the first film produced by Ramkumar Films, named after Ganesan's son. The film had Ganesan and Jayalalitha pairing for first time.

The song sequence "Engal Kalyanam" was shot at Anna Nagar Tower Park becoming the first film to be shot there. Rajendran required that all the lead actors appear in the song, but was unable to bring them all together except for "half a day of shoot" due to their other commitments; as a result, he had to rely on "used cuts, zooms and whizz-pans to circumvent the challenge". To portray Ganesan as "stylish and youthful", he created a shot of him walking from the manager's room to his seat, hoping it would create a huge response among the audience.

== Soundtrack ==
The music was composed by M. S. Viswanathan, with lyrics by Vaali. The song "Nalla Idam" contains the lines "Nalla Idam, Nee Vandha Idam" (Good place, the place you have come), which writer R. Kannan interpreted as meaning Jayalalithaa had moved to Sivaji Ganesan from acting exclusively with M. G. Ramachandran.

Song	Singers	Length
"Appappa Naan"	T. M. Soundararajan	03:41
"Engal Kalyanam"	T. M. Soundararajan, P. B. Sreenivas, P. Susheela, L. R. Eswari, C. S. Ganesh	05:07
"Mella Varum Kaatru"	T. M. Soundararajan, P. Susheela	03:39
"Nalla Idam"	T. M. Soundararajan, P. Susheela	04:31
"Uravinil"	C. S. Ganesh, L. R. Eswari	03:16

== Release and reception ==
Galatta Kalyanam was released on 12 April 1968. Kalki appreciated the film for its comical dialogues and non-confusing direction.

== Legacy ==
In 2003, Malathi Rangarajan of The Hindu wrote, "Together with Nagesh, Sivaji Ganesan made watching Galatta Kalyanam a memorable experience". In 2013, Anupama Subramanian of Deccan Chronicle praised Jayalalitha's performance, stating that "It was Galatta Kalyanam [..] which brought out her flair for comedy". The title of the Tamil-dubbed version of the Hindi film Atrangi Re (2021) was taken from this film.
