= Snehikkan Samayamilla =

- Directed by: Vijay Anand
- Written by: Chitralaya Gopu
- Screenplay by: Jagathy N. K. Achari
- Produced by: Srikanth
- Starring: Madhu; Jayan; Adoor Bhasi; Sankaradi
- Edited by: Vijayanand
- Music by: A. T. Ummer
- Production company: Sree Kasthuri Combines
- Distributed by: Sree Kasthuri Combines
- Release date: 30 November 1978
- Country: India
- Language: Malayalam

Snehikkan Samayamilla is a 1978 Indian Malayalam film, directed by Vijay Anand and produced by Srikanth. The film stars Madhu, Jayan, Adoor Bhasi and Sankaradi in the lead roles. The film has musical score by A. T. Ummer. The movie was based on 1968 Tamil hit movie Galatta Kalyanam starring Sivaji Ganesan and Jayalalithaa.

== Cast ==
- Madhu
- Jayan
- Adoor Bhasi
- Sankaradi
- Janardanan
- Kuthiravattam Pappu
- Meena
- Reena
- Vijayalalitha

== Soundtrack ==
The music was composed by A. T. Ummer and the lyrics were written by Sasthamangalam Raju and Dr. Balakrishnan.

No.	Song	Singers	Lyrics	Length (m:ss)
1	"Ambika Hridayaanandam"	P. Susheela, Chorus	Sasthamangalam Raju	
2	"Kuttappa Njan Achanalleda"	P. Jayachandran, Jolly Abraham	Dr. Balakrishnan	
3	"Sandhye Nee Va Va Sindooram Tha Tha"	S. Janaki, P. Jayachandran	Dr. Balakrishnan	
