= Chithralaya =

Indian film production company

- Type: Film production and distribution
- Industry: Motion pictures
- Founded: c. 1960s
- Founder: C. V. Sridhar; Chithralaya Gopu; A. Vincent; Tiruchi Arunachalam

Chithralaya (/tʃiθrɑːləjɑː/) also spelt Chitralaya, is an Indian film production company founded in the early 1960s. It produced films in Tamil and Hindi, most of them directed by C. V. Sridhar. The company was founded by Sridhar, screenwriter Gopu (who later became known as Chithralaya Gopu), cinematographer A. Vincent and still photographer Tiruchi Arunachalam.

== History ==
After making films for Venus Studios, in the early 1960s Sridhar founded Chithralaya to make the kind of films he wanted. The company's logo featured a boatman and a woman travelling on a boat with the tagline, "Kadal Alayil Engal Siriya Thoni, Kalai Ulagil Engal Pudhiya Baani". When discussing with his associates what should be the company's first film, Sridhar devised the story of Nenjil Or Aalayam but later decided the company's first film should not be a tragedy and devised the lighter Thennilavu. Thennilavu was a success at the box office, running in theatres for over 100 days. After the success of Thennilavu, Sridhar made Nenjil Or Aalayam, set completely in a hospital and became the first Tamil film to be shot entirely in single set. It also became a box-office success.

Chithralaya later produced Kadhalikka Neramillai, the first Tamil film in Eastmancolor with a contemporary setting. Though the film initially found no takers, forcing Chithralaya to distribute the film themselves, it became a major success. Gopu, one of the founders of the company, left after receiving more directorial offers. Sridhar's relative C. V. Rajendran was an assistant director in Chithralaya before making his directorial debut with Anubavam Pudhumai by a different studio. Thriveni was the only Malayalam film produced by Chithralaya. Uttharavindri Ulle Vaa, unlike Chithralaya's previous ventures, was only produced by Sridhar, and directed by debutant N. S. Chakravarthi. A magazine named after and run by Chithralaya was also founded. Many of Chithralaya's film posters were designed by Eswara Rao, among the most prolific poster designers in India.

== Filmography ==
Filmography
Year	Title	Language	Ref.
1961	Thennilavu	Tamil	
1962	Nenjil Or Aalayam	Tamil	
1964	Kadhalikka Neramillai	Tamil	
1965	Vennira Aadai	Tamil	
1966	Pyar Kiye Jaa	Hindi	
1967	Nenjirukkum Varai	Tamil	
1969	Sivantha Mann	Tamil	
1970	Thriveni	Malayalam	
1970	Dharti	Hindi	
1971	Uttharavindri Ulle Vaa	Tamil	
1971	Avalukendru Or Manam	Tamil	
1971	Duniya Kya Jaane	Hindi	
1973	Alaigal	Tamil	
1973	Gehri Chaal	Hindi	
1975	Vaira Nenjam	Tamil	
1983	Oru Odai Nadhiyagirathu	Tamil	
1986	Naanum Oru Thozhilali	Tamil	
1991	Thanthu Vitten Ennai	Tamil	
