= Thriveni =

- Poster
- Directed by: A. Vincent
- Screenplay by: Thoppil Bhasi
- Produced by: C. V. Sridhar
- Starring: Sathyan; Prem Nazir; Sharada; Kaviyoor Ponnamma; Savita G. Thampi
- Edited by: G. Venkittaraman
- Music by: G. Devarajan
- Production company: Chitralaya
- Release date: 4 December 1970
- Country: India
- Language: Malayalam

Thriveni (transl. Three rivers) is a 1970 Indian Malayalam-language film directed by A. Vincent and produced by C. V. Sridhar through Chitralaya in their only production in Malayalam. The film stars Sathyan, Prem Nazir, Sharada, Savita G. Thampi, and Kaviyoor Ponnamma. The film's music was composed by G. Devarajan.

Sharada won the Kerala State Film Award for Best Actress for the film.

== Cast ==
- Sathyan as Damodaran Muthalali
- Prem Nazir as Shivaraman
- Sharada as Thankamma
- Kaviyoor Ponnamma as Parvathy
- KPAC Lalitha as Janaki
- Adoor Bhasi as Purushu
- Thikkurissy Sukumaran Nair as Padmanabhan
- Sankaradi as Shankarapilla
- Alummoodan as Neelakandan
- Kedamangalam Ali, supporting role (unnamed)
- Raghava Menon, supporting role (unnamed)
- Abbas, supporting role (unnamed)
- Paravoor Bharathan as Mathai
- Savita G. Thampi as Shivaraman's son

== Soundtrack ==
The music was composed by G. Devarajan, with lyrics by Vayalar Ramavarma.

| No. | Title | Singer(s) | Length |
|---|---|---|---|
| 1. | "Kaithappuzhakkaayalile" | K. J. Yesudas |
| 2. | "Kezhakku Kezhakkoraana" | P. B. Sreenivas, Latha Raju |
| 3. | "Paamaram Palunku Kondu" | P. Susheela |
| 4. | "Sangamam Sangamam" | K. J. Yesudas |
| 5. | "Sangamam Sangamam" (Pathos) | K. J. Yesudas |

== Box office ==
The film was a commercial success.
