= Avalukendru Or Manam =

1971 film by C. V. Sridhar

- Poster
- Directed by: Sridhar
- Written by: Sridhar
- Produced by: Sridhar
- Starring: Gemini Ganesan; Muthuraman; Bharathi; Kanchana
- Cinematography: U. Rajagopal
- Edited by: N. M. Shankar
- Music by: M. S. Viswanathan
- Production company: Chithralaya
- Release date: 18 June 1971
- Country: India
- Language: Tamil

Avalukendru Or Manam (transl. A mind of her own) is a 1971 Indian Tamil-language film romantic drama film produced, written and directed by Sridhar. The film stars Gemini Ganesan, Muthuraman, Bharathi and Kanchana. It revolves around two women who fall in love with the same man.

Avalukendru Or Manam was simultaneously made in Hindi as Duniya Kya Jaane, with a largely different cast, though Bharathi repeated her role. It was released on 18 June 1971, and performed averagely at the box office.

== Plot ==
Lalitha loves Kannan, but he initially does not reciprocate. Her friend, Meena belongs to a middle class family and loves her neighbour, Muthuraman who runs a chit fund. One day she discovers that he is a womaniser and drunkard. She breaks up with him and tears his letters. Meena accidentally meets Kannan, who falls in love with her. How the three of them manage their complex relationship forms the rest of the story.

== Cast ==
Male cast

- Gemini Ganesan as Kannan
- Muthuraman as Gopal
- Sundarrajan as Parameswaran
- V. S. Raghavan as Sathyamoorthy

Female cast

- Bharathi as Lalitha
- Kanchana as Meena
- Rukmani as Rajam

== Production ==
Sridhar's directorial Dharti failed at the box office, and his company Chithralaya suffered losses. To compensate for the losses, Sridhar decided to do two projects at the same time: Avalukendru Or Manam and Uttharavindri Ulle Vaa. Avalukendru Or Manam was simultaneously made in Hindi as Duniya Kya Jaane. While choosing established actors in Tamil, Sridhar cast newcomers in Hindi to keep the budget lower, though Bharathi appeared in both versions.

== Soundtrack ==
The music was composed by M. S. Viswanathan, with lyrics by Kannadasan. Ilaiyaraaja, who was Viswanathan's assistant at that time played the organ for the song "Malar Edhu".

Title	Singer(s)	Length
"Malar Edhu En Kangal"	P. Susheela	4:03
"Unnidathil Ennai Koduthaen"	S. Janaki	4:44
"Ayiram Ninaivu Ayiram Kanavu"	S. P. Balasubrahmanyam	4:28
"Mangayaril Maharani"	S. P. Balasubrahmanyam, P. Susheela	4:14
"Deviyin Kovil Paravai Idu"	S. Janaki	3:30
"Ellorum Paarkka"	L. R. Eswari	4:14
