= Moondru Deivangal =

- Theatrical release poster
- Directed by: Dada Mirasi
- Screenplay by: Chitralaya Gopu
- Story by: Madhusudan Kalekar
- Produced by: K. R. Seenivasan; N. Naga Subramaniyam
- Starring: Sivaji Ganesan; R. Muthuraman; Nagesh
- Cinematography: K. S. Prasad
- Edited by: N. M. Shankar
- Music by: M. S. Viswanathan
- Production company: Sri Bhuvaneswari Movies
- Release date: 14 August 1971
- Country: India
- Language: Tamil

Moondru Deivangal (transl. Three gods) is a 1971 Indian Tamil-language drama film, directed by Dada Mirasi and written by Chitralaya Gopu. The film stars Sivaji Ganesan, Muthuraman and Nagesh. It is a remake of the 1968 Marathi film Aamhi Jato Amuchya Gava. The film was released on 14 August 1971.

== Plot ==
Three thieves get into a family's home pretending to be good-hearted people. However, the family's humility causes a change of heart among them. Whether the thieves reform or not forms the rest of the story.

== Cast ==
- Sivaji Ganesan as Siva
- Muthuraman as Muthu
- Nagesh as Nagu
- V. K. Ramasamy as Kumar's uncle
- S. V. Subbaiah as Pasupathy
- Sivakumar as Kumar
- V. S. Raghavan as a retired police officer
- M. R. R. Vasu as Veerappan
- Vennira Aadai Moorthy as Moorthy
- Senthamarai as a police officer
- Chandrakala as Lakshmi
- Rukmani as Parvathi
- Jaya Kausalya
- Vijaya Chandrika as Muthu's wife
- K. R. Indira Devi
- Sivakami

== Production ==
Moondru Deivangal is based on the 1968 Marathi film Aamhi Jato Amuchya Gava, written by Madhusudan Kalekar. The screenplay was written by Chitralaya Gopu, departing from most of his earlier screenplays which were comedies.

== Soundtrack ==
The music was composed by M. S. Viswanathan, with lyrics by Kannadasan. The song "Vasanthathil Or Naal" is set in Darbari Kanada raga.

Song	Singers
"Then Mazhaiyile Mangani"	P. Susheela
"Tirupathi Sendru Thirumbi Vandhal"	Sirkazhi Govindarajan
"Mullilla Roja"	S. P. Balasubrahmanyam, P. Susheela
"Thai Enum Selvangal"	T. M. Soundararajan
"Nee Oru Chellapillai"	L. R. Eswari
"Nadappadhu Sugam"	T. M. Soundararajan, S. P. Balasubrahmanyam
"Vasanthathil Orr Naal"	P. Susheela

== Release ==
Moondru Deivangal was released on 14 August 1971, and underperformed commercially; Gopu felt this was because "it wasn't of Sivaji's standard".
