= Thennilavu =

1961 film by C. V. Sridhar

- Theatrical release poster
- Directed by: Sridhar
- Written by: Sridhar
- Produced by: Sridhar
- Starring: Gemini Ganesh; Vyjayanthimala
- Cinematography: A. Vincent
- Edited by: T. R. Srinivasalu
- Music by: A. M. Rajah
- Production company: Chithralaya
- Release date: 30 September 1961
- Running time: 160 minutes
- Country: India
- Language: Tamil

Thennilavu (pronounced [teːn nilaʋu] transl. Honeymoon) is a 1961 Indian Tamil-language romantic comedy film written, produced and directed by Sridhar. It stars Gemini Ganesan (credited as Ganesh) and Vyjayanthimala, with K. A. Thangavelu, M. N. Nambiar, M. Saroja and Vasanthi in supporting roles. The film's plot is about a man who, due to mistaken identity, is appointed as a manager by a young woman for her father's honeymoon in Kashmir. The man and the woman fall in love but things go awry when the real manager arrives in Kashmir.

Thennilavu is the first film Sridhar produced through his production company Chithralaya; it is also the first South Indian film to be made in Jammu and Kashmir; additional filming took place in Madras (now Chennai) and Kodaikanal. Principal photography took about two months to complete. A. M. Rajah composed the soundtrack and Kannadasan wrote the lyrics. Cinematography was handled by A. Vincent, art direction by Ganga and editing by T. R. Srinivasulu. The film was released on 30 September 1961 and became a commercial success.

== Plot ==
A man named Raj meets a woman named Shanti in Madras and falls in love with her. Shanti does not reciprocate his love and leaves for her home in Bangalore. Shanti's father Sokkalingam and his new wife Thangam decide to honeymoon in Kashmir; Shanti also wants to come. A friend of Sokkalingam suggests an alliance between Shanti and his nephew Raj, who is now in Madras. Raj-2 abandons his wife Lalitha, whom he had secretly married, when he learns of this proposed alliance; he leaves for Bangalore but misses the train. Raj-1 arrives in Bangalore, where Sokkalingam mistakes him for his friend's nephew. Sokkalingam and Thangam leave for Kashmir with Raj-1 and Shanti, who still dislikes Raj-1 but eventually returns his love.

Raj-2 reaches Kashmir in search of Sokkalingam. Lalitha, fearing the safety of her husband, also reaches Kashmir in search of him. Lalitha meets Raj-1 and stays in his house; she also meets Sokkalingam and tells him she is married to "Raj". Sokkalingam misinterprets this as Raj-1 and fires him as Shanti's manager. Meanwhile, Raj-2 meets Sokkalingam, explains everything and replaces Raj-1 as Shanti's manager, despite Shanti's dislike for him. Shanti later learns Lalitha is Raj-2's wife and reconciles with Raj-1 while Sokkalingam and Thangam are still unaware.

Raj-2 learns Shanti loves Raj-1 and becomes jealous. At the same time, he meets Lalitha, who he orders to return, otherwise she will be killed. Lalitha flees but secretly writes Raj-2 a love letter. Raj-2, touched by the letter, decides to take Lalitha on a boat ride but plans to kill her and frame Raj-1. When Lalitha joins Raj-2 on the boat ride, he forcefully rides the boat, causing her to fall into the lake. Subsequently, he frames Raj-1. Sokkalingam reports Lalitha's murder to the Kashmir Police, who chase Raj-1, who elopes with Shanti—his only source of an alibi.

Raj-1 and Shanti run into a forest for shelter, where they discover Lalitha is still alive and has been captured by a group of terrorists. Raj-1 and Shanti are put into the same prison as Lalitha, who reveals she washed ashore and was discovered by one of the terrorists. He started torturing Lalitha and she pushed him over a cliff to his death, and was imprisoned for murder. A gypsy dancer from the terrorist group helps them escape the prison but nearby guards see them and start shooting at them. The three escapees climb onto a boat, which develops a crack and starts sinking, leading to Raj-1's separation from Lalitha and Shanti. Raj-1 swims ashore and the police capture him.

During Raj-1's trial in the high court, Shanti and Lalitha arrive, leading to his acquittal. The letter Lalitha wrote to her husband is discovered and after reading the last line, in which Lalitha advised her husband to kill her if wanted, the court suspects Raj-2 of her attempted murder. Lalitha claims she accidentally fell into the lake and does not identify Raj-2 as her husband. The case is dismissed, and Sokkalingam and Thangam continue their honeymoon.

== Cast ==
Male cast

- Gemini Ganesh as Raj-1
- K. A. Thangavelu as Sokkalingam
- M. N. Nambiar as Raj-2

Female cast

- Vyjayanthimala as Shanthi
- M. Saroja as Thangam
- Vasanthi as Lalitha

Other supporting roles were played by K. Natarajan, V. Mahalingam, Padmini Priyadarshini, Veeraragavan and Balakrishnan.

== Production ==
=== Development ===
In the early 1960s, Sridhar founded the production company Chithralaya after making films for Venus Studios. (Note: While S. Theodore Baskaran says in his 1996 book The Eye of the Serpent Chithralaya was founded in 1961, Sanjit Narwekar says in the 1994 book Directory of Indian film-makers and films it was founded in 1960.) When discussing with his associates what should be the company's first film, Sridhar devised the story of Nenjil Or Aalayam but later decided the company's first film should not be a tragedy and devised the lighter Thennilavu. A. Vincent was the cinematographer, Ganga was the art director and T. R. Srinivasulu was the editor. Film News Anandan was Chithralaya's public relations officer for the film. Sridhar cast most of the actors who appeared in his directorial debut Kalyana Parisu (1959); Gemini Ganesan (credited as Ganesh), K. A. Thangavelu, M. N. Nambiar and M. Saroja. Despite being replete with Hindi film offers, Vyjayanthimala accepted to star as the female lead. This was the Tamil film debut of Vasanthi.

=== Filming ===
Thennilavu is the South Indian film to be shot in Jammu and Kashmir, unlike most Tamil films of that period, which were mostly filmed in studios. The first scene was filmed during an India-Pakistan cricket match in Madras (now Chennai) at Jawaharlal Nehru Stadium, then known as the Corporation Stadium. This scene was also used as the background for the film's opening credits. One scene that was filmed in Madras depicts several buildings near Marina Beach that were under construction. While filming at Dal Lake, where the song "Nilavum Malarum" was filmed, Vyjayanthimala almost drowned but was rescued by the cameraman. The song "Oho Endhan Baby" was picturised on Ganesan and Vyjayanthimala water skiing; Vyjayanthimala refused to use a body double. Other shooting locations included Shalimar Bagh, Pahalgam and Gulmarg.

Principal photography lasted about two months. In retrospect, Sridhar noted he was determined to ensure all scenes in Kashmir were filmed well because returning to re-film them would be impossible. Because Kashmir did not have facilities, film rolls had to be sent to Vijaya Laboratory in Madras for processing. Before the film's release, the censor board objected to the climax where the lead character clashes with the Gurjar community, feeling it would lead to severing ties between India and Kashmir; this forced Sridhar to shoot a different climax at parts of Kodaikanal resembling Kashmir. Patch work for certain scenes was done on a set built at Vijaya Studios. The final cut of the film measured 15,125 feet (4,610 m).

== Soundtrack ==
A. M. Rajah composed Thennilavu's music and Kannadasan wrote the lyrics. A. Maruthakasi was originally signed on as the film's lyricist and wrote three songs but differences arose between Rajah and Maruthakasi during the making of another Sridhar film Vidivelli (1960) and Maruthakasi swore not to work with Rajah again, and forced him to abandon the songs already written for Thennilavu. Vyjayanthimala was affectionately called "Pappa", which Kannadasan translated into English as "Baby" and wrote the song "Oho Endhan Baby". Writing for Scroll.in, Sruthisagar Yamunan noted many Tamil film songs in the 1960s have repetitive interludes, "the same notes and orchestration repeating before every charanam", citing "Paattu Padava" as an example.

Both "Oho Endhan Baby" and "Paattu Padava" are set in the Carnatic raga known as Keeravani, while "Nilavum Malarum Paaduthu" is set in Mohanam. N. Krishnaswamy, writing for The Indian Express in 1988, said "Kaalaiyum Neeye" is set in Hamsanandi, a view that is shared by Shoba Narayan, who was writing for Mint in 2009. Singer Charulatha Mani said it only has "Hamsanandi-like phrases" and is not strictly based on the raga itself. Carnatic musicologist Sundararaman identifies it as being set in the Hindustani raga Basant, while K. Easwaralingam, writing for Thinakaran, said it is set in Hamsadhvani. "Oorengum Thaedinaen" is set in Charukesi. "Paattu Padava" was later adapted into a different song titled "All Your Beauty", which appears in the film Goli Soda (2014). It was also recreated as the theme song for the 2022 TV series Iniya.

Track listing
No.	Title	Singer(s)	Length
1.	"Chinna Chinna Kannile"	A. M. Rajah, P. Susheela	3:44
2.	"Kaalaiyum Neeye"	A. M. Rajah, S. Janaki	3:28
3.	"Malare Malare Theriyatha"	P. Susheela	3:43
4.	"Nilavum Malarum"	A. M. Rajah, P. Susheela	3:42
5.	"Oho Endhan Baby"	A. M. Rajah, S. Janaki	3:13
6.	"Oorengum Thaedinaen"	Jikki	3:02
7.	"Paattu Padava"	A. M. Rajah	3:42
Total length:			24:34

== Release and reception ==
Thennilavu was released on 30 September 1961. Kanthan of Kalki praised the performances of the cast and the photography in Kashmir but criticised the story. Kumudam gave a more negative review, playing on the film's title by saying "Thennilavu Veen Selavu" (Thennilavu is a waste of money). It was a success at the box office, running in theatres for over 100 days.

== Legacy ==
Thennilavu inspired the filming of more Indian films in Kashmir. Baradwaj Rangan said; "People from an older era may claim that the definitive Gemini romance was Missiamma, which reportedly was our grandmothers' Titanic [...] I, however, go with [Thennilavu], if only for the too-cool image of him in swimming trunks, water-skiing alongside the charmingly young Vyjayanthimala." Mohan Raman named Thennilavu one of "the best examples" where Thangavelu played a "father" role. Thangavelu's dialogue "Kashmirikku ponakka cash meeruma?!" ("Will we have cash left if we go to Kashmir?") attained popularity. A sari brand named after the film was launched by Nalli Kuppuswami Chetti in 1961. The song "Paattu Padava" was included in the opening scene of the 2020 Canadian film Funny Boy.

== Bibliography ==
- Balabharathi (2012). தமிழ் சினிமா 80 பாகம்-1 [Tamil Cinema 80 Part-1] (in Tamil). Chennai: Nakkheeran Publications. ISBN 978-93-81828-40-3.
- Bali, Vyjayanthimala (2007). Bonding... A Memoir. New Delhi: Stellar Publishers. ISBN 978-8190455916.
- Baskaran, S. Theodore (1996). The Eye of the Serpent: An Introduction to Tamil Cinema. Chennai: East West Books. OCLC 243920437.
- Ganesh, Narayani (2011). Eternal Romantic: My Father, Gemini Ganesan. Roli Books. ISBN 978-81-7436-578-1.
- Narwekar, Sanjit (1994). Directory of Indian film-makers and films. Flicks Books. ISBN 978-0-948911-40-8.
- Sundararaman (2007) [2005]. Raga Chintamani: A Guide to Carnatic Ragas Through Tamil Film Music (2nd ed.). Chennai: Pichhamal Chintamani. OCLC 295034757.
