= Chithralaya Gopu =

Indian screenwriter and director (born 1931)

Chitralaya Gopu
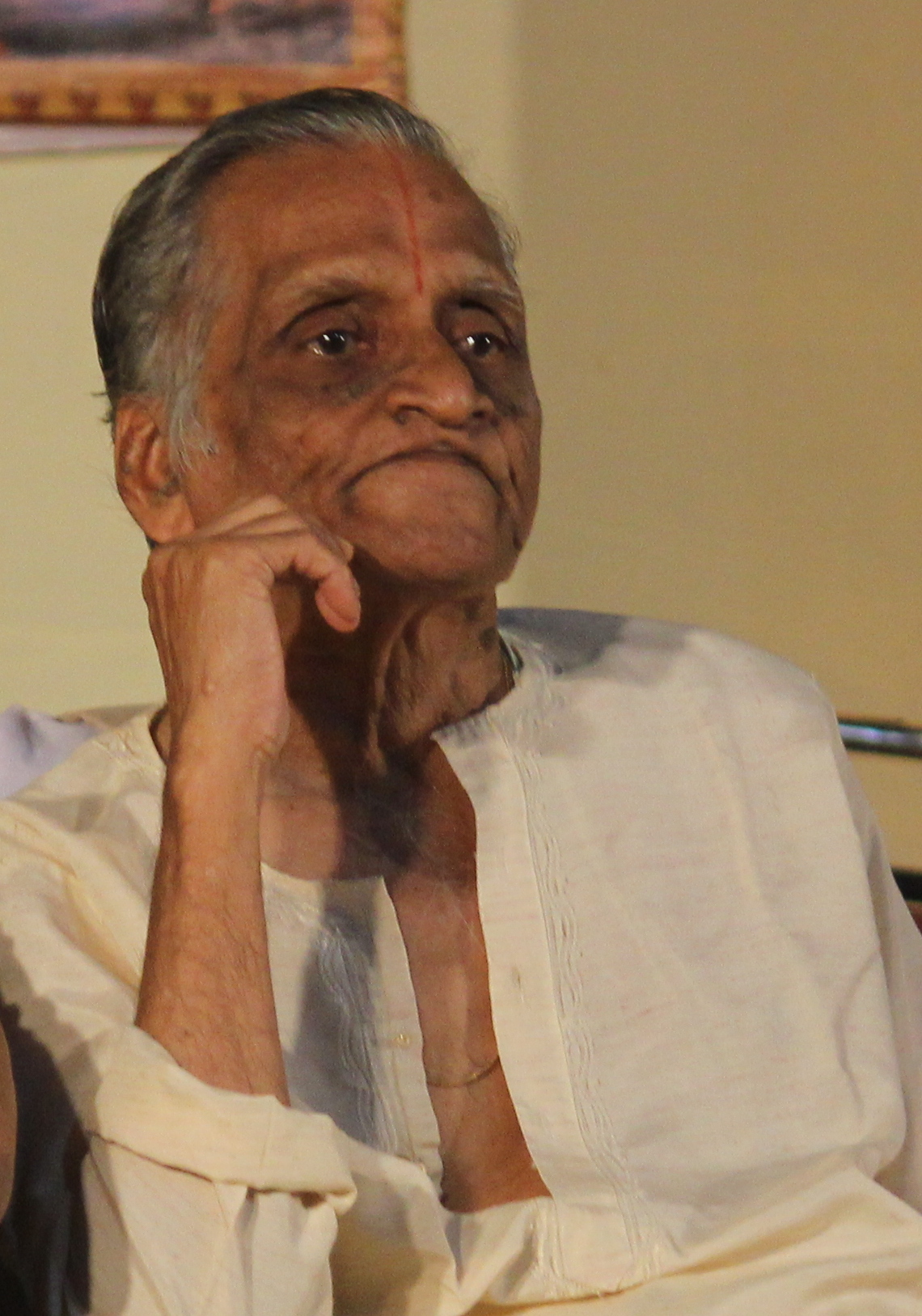
- Gopu at the play "Chocolate Krishna" in 2015
- Born: Sadagopan; 2 July 1931 (age 95)
- Occupations: Writer, director
- Years active: 1959–1990
- Spouse: Kamala
- Children: 4

Sadagopan (better known as Chitralaya Gopu) is an Indian screenwriter and director who works in Tamil cinema. He has written nearly 60 films, and directed 27 of them. He scripted dramatic films such as Moondru Dheivangal and Shanti Nilayam and comedies such as Kadhalikka Neramillai, Galatta Kalyanam, Patti Sollai Thattathe and Uttharavindri Ulle Vaa.

== Career ==
C. V. Sridhar and Sadagopan were friends since their schooldays at St. Joseph's High School, Chengalpattu. Both were playwrights; Sridhar wrote stage plays and played the hero while Sadagopan wrote the humorous parts and played the comedian. Later, when Sridhar had the opportunity to direct a film, he asked Sadagopan to join him and produce the comedy track. The film Kalyana Parisu (1959) was a hit and Sridhar started his own production house, Chitralaya. Sadagopan became popularly known as 'Chitralaya' Gopu.

He received the Kalaimamani Award from Tamil Nadu Chief Minister Jayalalithaa in 1992.

He directed and acted in television forays, such as Washingtonil Thirumanam, which was shot in the U.S.

== Personal life ==
Gopu is married to Kamala, a novelist. They have four sons.

== Partial filmography ==
Year	Film	Credited as		Notes
Year	Film	Director	Writer	Notes
1959	Kalyana Parisu	✗	✓	
1962	Nenjil Or Aalayam	✗	✓	
1964	Kadhalikka Neramillai	✗	✓	
1964	Kalai Kovil	✗	✓	
1966	Pyar Kiye Jaa	✗	✓	Remake of Kadhalikka Neramillai
1966	Kodimalar	✗	✓	
1967	Nenjirukkum Varai	✗	✓	
1967	Ooty Varai Uravu	✗	✓	
1967	Anubavam Pudhumai	✗	✓	
1968	Galatta Kalyanam	✗	✓	
1969	Shanti Nilayam	✗	✓	
1970	Veettuku Veedu	✗	✓	
1971	Moondru Deivangal	✗	✓	
1971	Sumathi En Sundari	✗	✓	
1971	Uttharavindri Ulle Vaa	✗	✓	
1972	Kasethan Kadavulada	✓	✓	
1974	Athaiya Mamiya	✓	✓	
1974	Penn Ondru Kanden	✓	✓	
1974	Galate Samsara	✗	✓	
1977	Kalamadi Kalam	✓	✓	
1977	Rasi Nalla Rasi	✓	✓	
1979	Alankari	✓	✓	
1979	Aasaikku Vayasillai	✓	✓	
1979	Dhairyalakshmi	✓	✓	
1984	Raja Veettu Kannukkutty	✗	✓	
1985	Thanga Mama 3D	✗	✓	
1985	Vellai Manasu	✓	✓	
1985	Thendrale Ennai Thodu	✗	✓	
1988	Vasanthi	✓	✓	
1988	Paatti Sollai Thattathe	✗	✓	
1989	Dilli Babu	✓	✓	
1990	Ulagam Pirandhadhu Enakkaga	✗	✓	Last film
