= Anubavam Pudhumai =

1967 film by C. V. Rajendran

- Poster
- Directed by: C. V. Rajendran
- Screenplay by: Chitralaya Gopu
- Story by: Raju
- Produced by: T. S. Sethuraman; K. N. Shanmugam; A. R. Thiyagarajan
- Starring: R. Muthuraman; Rajasree; T. R. Ramachandran; Manorama
- Cinematography: P. N. Sundaram
- Edited by: N. M. Shankar
- Music by: M. S. Viswanathan
- Production company: Thirumagal Combines
- Distributed by: Santhi Pictures
- Release date: 2 March 1967
- Country: India
- Language: Tamil

Anubavam Pudhumai (transl. New Experience) is a 1967 Indian Tamil-language comedy thriller film directed by C. V. Rajendran in his debut and written by Chitralaya Gopu from a story by Raju. The film stars R. Muthuraman and Rajasree. It was released on 2 March 1967. The film was remade in Hindi as Hulchul (1971).

== Cast ==
- R. Muthuraman
- Rajasree
- T. R. Ramachandran
- Major Sundarrajan
- Manorama
- T. S. Balaiah
- V. S. Raghavan
- R. S. Manohar
- Senthamarai

== Production ==
Anubavam Pudhumai was the directorial debut of C. V. Rajendran. Cinematography was handled by P. N. Sundaram, and editing by N. M. Shankar.

== Soundtrack ==
The soundtrack was composed by M. S. Viswanathan.

All lyrics are written by Kannadasan.

No.	Title	Singer(s)	Length
1.	"Aadai Kattum"	T. M. Soundararajan
2.	"Yen Ondrodu"	L. R. Eswari
3.	"Kanavil Nadanthatho"	P. B. Sreenivas, P. Susheela
4.	"Sugam Enge"	T. M. Soundararajan, P. Susheela
5.	"Enna Ninaithu"	Manorama

== Reception ==
Kalki appreciated Balaiah's comedy performance and Sundarrajan's performance but criticised Muthuraman's, and called Viswanathan's music sweet. The film failed commercially.
