= Uttharavindri Ulle Vaa =

- Poster
- Directed by: N. C. Chakravarthi
- Screenplay by: Gopu
- Produced by: Sridhar
- Starring: Ravichandran; Nagesh; Thengai Srinivasan; Moorthy; Mali; Kanchana; Rama Prabha; Sachu; Sundari Bai; Vijaya Chandrika
- Cinematography: B. S. Lokanath
- Edited by: N. M. Shankar
- Music by: M. S. Viswanathan
- Production company: Chithralaya
- Release date: 14 January 1971
- Country: India
- Language: Tamil

Uttharavindri Ulle Vaa (transl. Come inside without permission) is a 1971 Indian Tamil-language romantic comedy film, directed by N. S. Chakravarthi in his debut, produced by Sridhar and written by Gopu. The film features an ensemble cast including Ravichandran, Nagesh, Thengai Srinivasan, Moorthy, Mali, Kanchana, Rama Prabha, Sachu, Sundari Bai and Vijaya Chandrika. It was released on 14 January 1971. The film was remade in Telugu as Vintha Illu Santha Gola (1976).

== Plot ==
Ravi lives in a bungalow that was bought by his father recently, so that Ravi can study in the city. Ravi stays with his three other bachelor friends, Mani, Raju and Mahalingam alias Mali. Raju works in a sports store which is a mundane job. Mani works as an assistant manager in a company while Mali works as a mechanic. When Ravi gets his collage leave for a week, the 4 friends plan to go on a vacation to Ooty. The three working friends cook up story to attain leave and succeed. The night prior to their planned trip, a woman comes and hides in their house. When the guys find her, she simply says that she is trying to protect herself. Ravi allows her to stay in his house for the time being and cancels the trip.

All 4 of them falls for the woman, Janaki and tries to make themselves good in front of her. They also come to a deal that if she falls for any one of them, the other 3 should give way to which all agree. They do various stuff to impress her. But Janaki falls for Ravi. One night, they all hear a child crying outside their house. An a one-year-old girl is found alone with a letter addressed to Mahalingam. It said that its from Sharadha, a woman that Mahalingam has cheated and the child is his. Mahalingam denies knowing such a woman but no one trusts him. The take in the child regardless, and name her Shanti. Ravi and Janaki's love deepens.

One day, while Raju is travelling in a bus, a woman follows him all the way home and addresses him as Nadha (Old fashioned style to call a lover boy or husband). Shocked, Raju informs his friends. Shortly, the woman's mother, Sivagami comes to the house too and settles there. She informs the rest that her daughter, Andal met with an accident recently and had gotten the memories of her past life. In her previous birth, she was married to Raju. Raju hates her constant urging romance. In the meantime, Ravi's father pays a visit but the guys carry it forward in a smooth manner.

To prevent anything worse from happening, they plan to bring in a psychiatrist, Dr. Swaminathan to cure Andal. Swami is assisted by his nurse daughter, Sarasa. Janaki sees Swami and gets shocked, and so does he. Sarasa and Mani fall in love. Swami tells Mani that he had seen Janaki in a brothel when he went to attend a patient. Mani gets shocked and informs Mali and Raju. Janaki overhears this and leaves the house. When Mani tells Ravi about this, Ravi gets angry at him and goes to find Janaki.

Meanwhile, Raju brings Andal on his bike for a ride, as a treatment suggested by Swami. He hits a woman and she falls unconscious and so does Andal. Raju is arrested for the same. The woman's handbag is taken by the police and Raju sees the picture of Baby Shanti and a threatening letter from Mahalingam. Raju says that it's his friend Mali. Mali too gets arrested for threatening the woman. It is also revealed that the woman is Sharadha and the child is hers. Both Sharadha and Andal gets conscious and Sharadha leaves for the police station to meet her child. Andal gets her memories back. At the station it is revealed that Mali is not the Mahalingam that Sharadha intended to give the child to. It happened that before Ravi's father bought the house, a man named Mahalingam lived in the house and he was the one who cheated Sharadha. He turns out to be a criminal who is on the run.

Janaki, gets cornered by criminal Mahalingam and it turns out that he was the one who forced her to be a prostitute and she ran away and hid in Ravi's house, bringing back her intro in this film. Ravi fights the bad guys and rescues Janaki. Ravi's father also gets to know about it. In the end, Ravi marries Janaki, Raju marries Andal and Mani marries Sarasa.

== Cast ==
Male cast

- Ravichandran as Ravi
- Nagesh as Raju
- Thengai Srinivasan as Dr. Swaminathan
- Moorthy as Mani
- Mali as Mahalingam "Mali"

Female cast

- Kanchana as Janaki
- Rama Prabha as Andal
- Sachu as Sarasa
- Sundari Bai as Sivakami
- Vijaya Chandrika as Saradha

Supporting cast

- Veera Raghavan as Ravi's father
- Baby Shanthi

== Production ==
Sridhar's directorial Dharti failed at the box office, which led his production company Chithralaya to suffer losses. To compensate for the losses, Sridhar decided to do two projects at the same time, which became Avalukendru Or Manam and Uttharavindri Ulle Vaa. Unlike his previous films under Chithralaya where he only directed, for this film Sridhar only worked as producer while giving directorial responsibilities to his associate N. C. Chakravarthi who made his debut with this film. The film's screenplay was written by Gopu.

== Soundtrack ==
Music was composed by M. S. Viswanathan and lyrics were written by Kannadasan. According to Scroll writer Sruthisagar Yamunan, the song "Madhamo Aavani Mangaiyo", sung by S. P. Balasubrahmanyam, was proof of the singer's command over sangadhis, despite his lack of formal training in classical music. The song "Kadhal Kadhal Endru" is set in Dharmavati raga, "Utharavindri Ulle Vaa" is partly set in Ranjani, whereas "Theanaatrangaraiyinile" is set in Pahadi.

Song	Singers	Length
"Utharavindri Ulle Vaa"	L. R. Eswari, T. M. Soundararajan, S. P. Balasubrahmanyam	04:38
"Madhamo Aavani Mangaiyo"	S. P. Balasubrahmanyam, P. Susheela	04:19
"Unnai Thoduvathu Iniyathu"	S. P. Balasubrahmanyam, P. Susheela, Saibaba, L. R. Eswari	05:25
"Kaadhal Kaadhal Endru Pesa"	P. Susheela, M. L. Srikanth	04:47
"Theanaatrangaraiyinile"	L. R. Eswari	03:24
