= Duniya Kya Jaane =

- Poster
- Directed by: Sridhar
- Written by: Rajendra Krishan (dialogues)
- Produced by: Sridhar
- Starring: Bharathi; Premendra; Anupama; Manmohan
- Music by: Shankar–Jaikishan
- Production company: Chithralaya
- Release date: 1971
- Country: India
- Language: Hindi

Duniya Kya Jaane (transl. What does the world know?) is a 1971 Indian Hindi-language romantic drama film directed by Sridhar. It was simultaneously shot in Tamil as Avalukendru Or Manam, both versions starring Bharathi. The film was a box-office bomb.

== Cast ==
- Bharathi
- Premendra
- Anupama
- Manmohan

== Production ==
Duniya Kya Jaane was simultaneously shot in Tamil as Avalukendru Or Manam. While choosing established actors in Tamil, Sridhar cast newcomers in Hindi to keep the budget lower, though Bharathi appeared in both versions.

== Soundtrack ==
The music was composed by Shankar–Jaikishan.

Track listing
No.	Title	Singer(s)	Length
1.	"Dekh Le Ek Nazar"	Asha Bhosle	4:38
2.	"Ek Tamasha Hoon Main Dekhiye"	Asha Bhosle	4:37
3.	"Jhoom Jhoom Nach Uthi Barkha"	Kishore Kumar	4:08
4.	"Kitna Suhana Woh Din Hoga"	Asha Bhosle	4:19
5.	"Sanjh Savere Nain Tere Mere"	Asha Bhosle, Kishore Kumar	3:29
6.	"Duniya Kya Jane"	Lata Mangeshkar	3:32
Total length:			24:43

== Reception ==
The film was a box-office bomb, running for hardly two weeks in Bombay theatres.
