= Modern Kannada literature =

Language-based classification in India

Modern Kannada literature refers to the body of literature written in the Kannada language, a language spoken mainly in the Indian state of Karnataka. The Kannada script is the writing system used in Kannada literature. In the last forty years, eight modern Kannada authors have been awarded the Jnanpith award, a prestigious private literary award in India. In addition, the Sahitya Akademi Award, the second-highest award for literature granted by the Government of India, has been conferred upon Kannada writers fifty times.

== Dawn of modern literature ==
=== 1800–1900 ===
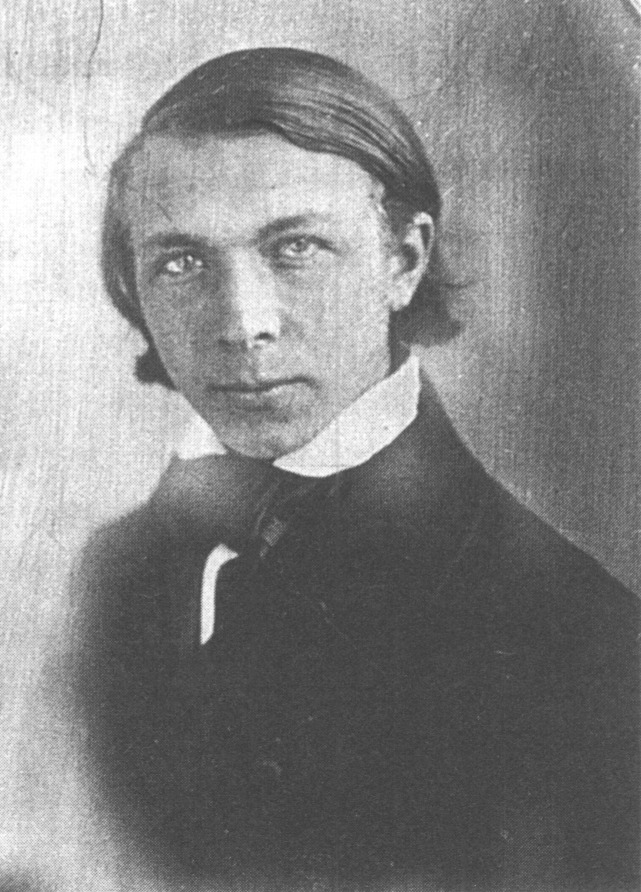
Ferdinand Kittel (1832–1903), Christian missionary and Kannada writer.

The nascent beginnings of modern Kannada literature can be traced to the early 19th century under the stewardship of Maharaja Krishnaraja Wodeyar III, the ruler of the princely state of Mysore, and court poets who attempted to steer away from the ancient champu form of prose and popularize prose renderings of Sanskrit epics and plays. Kempu Narayana's Mudramanjusha ("Seal Casket", 1823) can be considered the first modern novel, anterior to English influence on Kannada. Though inspired by Vishakhadatta's Sanskrit original Mudrarakshasa, the work displays a creativity of its own.

The impetus to modern literature came from a Western-style education and the Christian missionaries who relied on the local language to propagate the gospel. The arrival of the printing press was a catalyst to this process. Among the several early Kannada publications, the first Kannada-English dictionary by Ferdinand Kittel (1894) is noteworthy. B. L. Rice edited and published ancient Kannada classics and compiled a brief history of Kannada literature, while J. H. Fleet compiled a collection of folk ballads including the well-known Sangoli Rayana Dange ("The Revolt of Sangolli Raya"). The most outstanding lyrical poet of this period, whose poems were reminiscent of the medieval mystic Kannada poetry, was Sisunala Sharief.

In the latter half of the 19th century, progress towards original works in prose narratives initially gained momentum through translations from Sanskrit, English (Yatrikana Sanchara from "The Pilgrims Progress", 1847), Marathi (Yamuna Paryatana) and Bengali languages (Durgesanandini). Early dramatic literatures were translations from Sanskrit (Shakuntala, 1869) and English (Macbeth, King Lear and Romeo and Juliet).

With the standardization of modern prose, the earliest original social fictions were Suryakantha by Lakshman Gadagkar (1892) and Indira Bai by Gulvadi Venkata Rao (1899). With the theme being reform, the latter work critically examines social issues, reflecting an awakening. Original plays carrying the same theme include, among others, the Iggappa Heggadeya Vivaha Prahasana by Suri Venkataramana Sastri (1887). Nanadalike Lakshminarayana ('Muddanna') wrote two important prose pieces; Adbhuta Ramayana (1895) and Ramaswamedham (1898). What makes the latter writing historically important is that the epic Ramayana is looked at from a modern sensibility with the author as the narrator and his wife as the listener, the narration being interrupted at various stages with humorous exchanges between the couple, resulting from questions raised by the listener. The transition from the age of verse to prose may be summed up with Muddanna's proclamation "poetry deserves killing whereas prose reaches the heart" ("Padyam Vadyam, Gadyam Hridyam").

== The Renaissance ==
=== 1900-1925 ===
With the turn of the 20th century, B. M. Srikantaiah ('B. M. Sri'), regarded by some as the "Father of modern Kannada literature", gave the call for writing originals in modern Kannada, emancipating the language from ancient courtly classics and stressing the need for the influence of English literature. This period can be considered a seed time, for a golden age to come. His adaptation of lyrics from English were effective, the best known among his works being the English Geethagalu ("English Songs"), a seminal work that set the trend for "Navodaya" (new birth) Kannada poetry to come. Other notable poets who were able to evolve new metrics out of old ones were Masti Venkatesh Iyengar in his poem of love and tragedy, the Madalingana Kanive ("Madalinga's Valley", 1924) and Govinda Pai in the Kavitavatara (1916).

Though Panje Manjesh Rao (1900) is considered a pioneer in the field of short stories, it is Masti Venkatesh Iyengar who is credited for laying the foundation for a generation of short-story tellers with his Kelavu Sanna Kathegalu ("A few Short Stories", 1920) and Sanna Kathegalu ("Short Stories", 1924).

The consolidation of modern drama was pioneered by T. P. Kailasam, a towering personality in the field, with his Tollu Gatti ("The Hollow and the Solid", 1918). In contrast to the earlier Indira Bai (1899), this work examines the modern education system from a Gandhian viewpoint. Kailasam followed this with Tali Kattoke Cooline ("Wages for tying the Mangalsutra"), a story that criticizes the dowry system in marriage. Kailasam's plays were mainly concerned with problems effecting middle class Brahmin families; the dowry system, religious persecution, woes in the extended family system and exploitation of women. He represented for the first time in Kannada theatre, a spokesperson for liberal values and is thus considered by some as the one who laid the foundation of amateur Kannada theatre.

Summarizing the earlier historicals written in English by B. L. Rice, J. H. Fleet, Robert Sewell and Bhandarkar, Alur Ventaka Rao wrote the novel Karnataka Ghatavaibhava (1917). The work was intended to re-kindle pride among Kannadigas about their glorious past and bring awareness about the great rulers, poets and saints who had originated from Karnataka, its traditions and its heritage in arts and architecture.

=== 1925–1950 ===
==== Navodaya ====
The Navodaya period saw the rise of acclaimed lyricists who combined mystic poetry of the Vachanas and Kirthanas of medieval times and the native folk songs of oral traditions with influences from modern English romantics. Best known among them are D. R. Bendre, Gopalakrishna Adiga, K. V. Puttappa (Kuvempu), Shivarama Karanth, V. K. Gokak, Masti Venkatesh Iyengar, D. V. Gundappa ('DVG'), P. T. Narasimhachar, M. V. Seetharamiah, G. P. Rajaratnam, K. S. Narasimhaswamy and Adya Rangacharya ('Sri Ranga') and Gorur Ramaswamy Iyengar.

Bendre is perhaps the most outstanding of modern Kannada lyricists, authoring a collection of 27 poems, including such masterpieces as Gari ("Wing", 1932), Nadaleela (1938) and Sakhigeetha (1940). His poems had a transcendental quality about them which were neither narrative or dramatic. They cover a wide range of themes including patriotism, love of nature, conjugal love, transcendental experiences and sympathy for the poor. The Sakhigeetha is an autobiographical poem about his married life and personal experiences. Bendre had sworn that, in his poetry, he would "rather sow stars in Kannada soil than brillian jewels".

The beauty and grandeur of the Malnad hills strongly influenced Kuvempu, one of Kannada's doyen poets, in his Kalki (1933) in which the poet describes the life of the agrarian community. He further showed his brilliance in using the blank verse in his masterpiece and magnum opus that took him nine years to write, the Sri Ramayana Darshanam (1949) which contains 22,284 lines, divided into 50 cantos. This work marks the beginning of modern Kannada epic poetry. While the poem follows the Valmiki tradition, Kuvempu puts a stamp of originality on it, bringing together the Indian and western epic traditions.

In a departure from the original epic, Lanka (Ceylon) does not burn in the war nor does Sita enter the fire alone (called Agni Pravesha), but rather is followed by Rama. Both however reappear from the fire unscathed giving the mortals a glimpse of their divinity. Not only is Sita's chastity proven, so is Rama's fidelity towards her. Like medieval poet Nagachandra, Kuvempu portrays Ravana as an "evolving soul". He pays homage to all the great poets of the world, including the sage Valmiki, thus placing himself in the tradition of world epic poetry. The work abounds in metaphors and similes and brings home the thought that all living beings will eventually evolve into perfect beings. In the words of a historian, "No one could have imagined that the Kannada language is capable of this complex musical quality, for the first time in this century was Kannada made a language worthy of the gods".

Govinda Pai succeeded in depicting an authentic Christian ambience in the Golgotha (1931). Considered a unique Christian work in Indian literature, Pai narrates in detail, starting from the Christ being taken to Pontius Pilate by a hostile group of Jews demanding his death and the events leading to his crucifixion at Golgotha. The success of this work encouraged Pai to follow with three panegyrics in 1947; Vaishakhi, Prabhasa and Dehali, narrating the last days of the Buddha, God Krishna and Gandhi respectively. Gilivindu is his first collection of poems. Forty-six in all, they bring out his love for nature, his country and Kannada language while the Nandadeepa, a collection of 37 poems are about devotion to god.

The influence of the west inspired a new genre in writing, the essay. Here, A. N. Murthy Rao's Hagaluganasugalu ("Day Dreams", 1937) is best known.

M. V. Seetharamiah came to limelight during the peak of the Navodaya period and was inspired by such well-known writers as B. M. Srikantaiah and Masti Venkatesh Iyengar. A man of many talents, he was a renowned poet (Hakki Hadu or "Bird Song"), novelist ("Robinson Crusoe"), short story writer (Maargadharshaka), painter, musician, literary critic, researcher, dramatist (Swayamvara or "Choice of a Husband"), essayist (Hidi Hoovu or "Handful of flowers") and biographer (Kavi Ranna or "Poet Ranna"). To his credit are twelve collections of poems, ten collections of short stories, nine novels, four collections of essays, and nine plays.

All of Seetharamiah's contributions carry a liberal message of love for his surroundings, nature and mankind. An authority on Kannada grammar and literary history, it is to his credit for researching and establishing that the true author of the 9th century Kannada classic Kavirajamarga may have been poet Sri Vijaya in the court of King Amoghavarsha I. He established a research foundation in the name of his mentor, B. M. Srikantaiah ("B. M. Srikantaiah Prathishtana").

Perhaps the closest in comparison to the wisdom poems of the late medieval poet Sarvajna is the Mankuthimmana Kagga ("Dull Thimma's Rigmarole", 1943) by D. V. Gundappa. A successful journalist, he was known for his command over the Kannada language and its classics, with a knowledge of Sanskrit as well, despite his limited education which was limited to matriculation only. These qualities and experiences were to serve him well as a writer. Attributed to him are 60 writings in just about every genre of modern Kannada with the exception of the novel. His adaptation of Shakespeare's Macbeth into Kannada is well acclaimed.

The celebrated writer of conjugal love poems, who is known to have been inspired by Robert Burns, K. S. Narasimhaswamy won critical acclaim for Mysore Mallige ("Mysore Jasmine", 1942), a description of the bliss of everyday marital life. In later years, his poems were more metaphysical and included contemporary events in Dominion Janana and the Samsara Rajyanga.

Eminent poets produced inspiring poetic dramas, B. M. Srikantiah being the trailblazer with his Gadayuddha Natakam ("The War of Clubs", 1925), a modern version of Ranna's 982 classic and Aswaththaman, a native version of the Greek play Ajax by Sophocles. This was the beginning of tragic drama in Kannada, and a new way portraying ancient local heroes.

Govinda Pai's Hebberalu ("Thumb", 1946) dramatizes the story of Drona and Ekalavya, characters from the epic Mahabharata. Kailasam and his worthy contemporary, A. N. Swamy Venkatadri Iyer ('Samsa') continued to produce fine dramas. Samsa is credited with writing twenty-three plays, of which only six have survived. Of these, a trilogy on the Mysore King Ranadhira Kanteerava are well known; Vigada Vikramarya ("The Wicked Vikramarya", 1928), Vijayanarasimha (1936) and Mantrashakti in (1938).

Sri Ranga was a dominating and complete authority as a playwright, though he has penned poems and novels as well. In a period of forty years, he authored more than 40 full-length plays and more than 100 one-act plays. His plays, filled with wit and satire, are divided over two periods, the first between 1930 and 1952 where they mostly concerned with social issues. He wrote on Gandhian values and the decadence caused by the caste system in his Harijanwara ("The Harijan week", 1934), the Sandhyakala (1939) and the Sokachakra (1952).

The wit and satire in Kailasam's language, Kannada laced with English, and the social reformer in him are best exemplified in his plays Bahishkara (1929) which focusses on religious practices, and Soole ("Prostitute", 1945), which dwells on social problems.

The 1930s saw the rise of another major figure in Kannada literature, Shivarama Karanth, who debuted in play Garbhagudi ("Sanctum", 1932), which decries the exploitation of society in the name of religion. A series of successful novels were written by him in this period, best known among which are Chomana Dudi ("Choma's Toil", 1933) which describes the plight of a harijan in Indian society and Marali Mannige ("Back to the Soil", 1942), a story about rural life on the west coast centred on a family's evolution over three generations, during a time of change brought about by westernization. Kuvempu's well accepted Kanur Subbamma Heggadithi ("Subbamma Heggadithi of Kanur", 1936) is about an educated protagonist in a conservative society.

V. K. Gokak, who was educated in Oxford, established himself as an important contributor to poetics, criticism, drama and the novel in Kannada, with no less than 55 books to his credit. In addition, he was a distinguished critic of Indo-English literature. His other interests included culture, religion, philosophy and education. His first novel, Ijjodu ("Misalliance", 1935) dwells on marital problems caused by sexual incompatibility. His short stay in England helped confirm his love for his native country and language, resulting in the generation of Samudragitegalu ("Sea songs", 1940) and Samudradacheyinda ("From Beyond the Seas", 1940), the latter being a travelogue on his experiences there. His real epic, Bharata Sindhu Rashmi runs into 35,000 lines with the introduction in English.

Masti Venkatesh Iyengar continued to dominate in short stories with such classics as Kakana Kote ("Kaka's Fort", 1938), a novel that remained obscure for some time. Set in a tribal atmosphere, the story brings out the life of a tiny hamlet which eventually merges with a feudal chiefdom. Masti's description of their life, love and society is authentic and natural.

Whether P. T. Narasimhachar wrote an essay, a play or a poem, the poet in him was always evident. He has three collection of essays to his credit; Rathasaprami (1935), Ecchalumarada Kelage (1949) and Dhenukapurana (1969).

Other notable writers of this period were Gorur Ramaswamy Iyengar and Ajjampur Sitaram ('Ananda'). Gorur gave up studies to join the freedom struggle at the age of 17 and came under the enduring influence of Mahatma Gandhi whom he knew personally. He was active in the promotion of the "Cottage Industry" at the village level in the erstwhile Mysore state. A marvelous story teller, his first book Halliya Chitrgalu ("Village Vignettes", 1930) won him many laurels for his keen observation and narration of the beauty of rustic life. He followed this with several stories, describing on one hand the casteism and superstitions of rural communities and on the other the simplicity and charm in these communities. In addition to stories, he has to his credit essays, skits, travelogues and novels. In fact among the first novels ever to be written on the independence struggle was penned by him and is titled Merevanige ("Procession", 1948). Ananda's outstanding book, Nanu Konda Hudugi ("The Girl I Killed") is a tragedy centred on a girl who commits suicide after social disgrace.

Gopalakrishna Adiga describes the joy of political independence in Kattuvevu Navu ("We Shall Built", 1948), a longing for spiritual values in Mohana Murali (1944) and the importance of individual freedom in Samaja Bhairava.

=== 1950–1975 ===
==== Late Navodaya ====
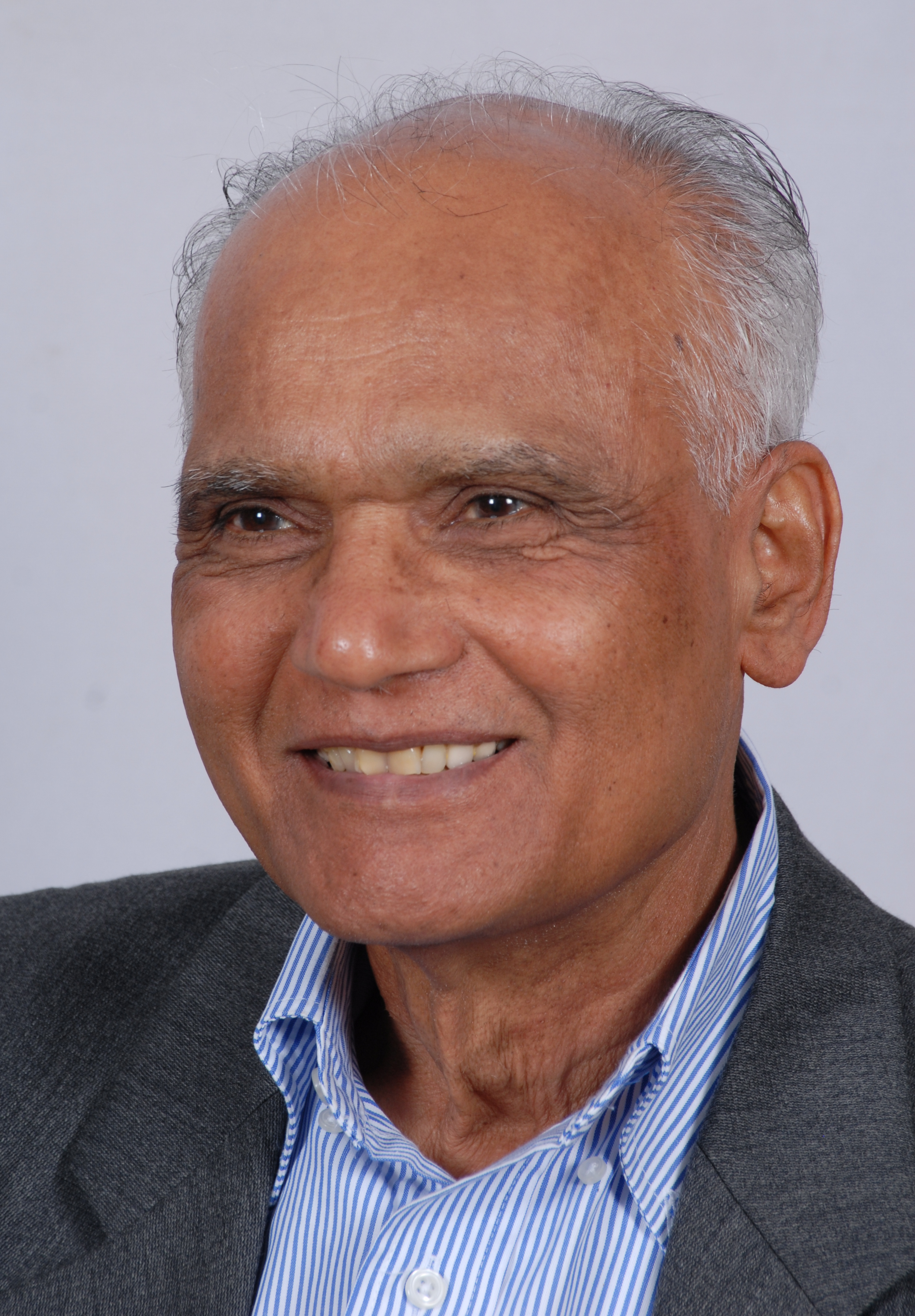
S.L.Bhyrappa, noted Kannada novelist

This period saw the emergence of new trends such as the Navya (modernist) and Pragatishila (progressive) though the legends of the previous era continued to produce notable works in the older Navodaya style. In poetry, D. R. Bendre's Naku Tanti ("Four Strings", 1964) and Kuvempu's Aniketana (1964) are well known. Gokak brought out the innate insufficiencies in the more advanced western cultures in Indilla Nale (1965).

The Navodaya style novels continued to be successful with such noteworthy works as Shivarama Karanth's Mookajjiya Kanasugalu ("Mookajji's Visions", 1968), where the author explores the origins of mans' faith in the mother goddess and the stages of evolution of civilization. Kuvempu's Malegallali Madumagalu ("The Bride of the Hills", 1967) is about loving relationships that exist in every strata of society. Being a playwright, Sri Ranga gave a dramatic touch to his Purushartha (1947) where the entire action is on 15 August 1947, and the protagonist and his three friends reminisce about the past.

Masti Ventakesh Iyengar's two classic novels of this era were the Channabasavanayaka (1950), which describes the overthrow of Bidanur's chief Channabasava Nayaka (on Karnataka's coast) by Haider Ali in the late 18th century, and Chickavirarajendra (1950), which describes the fall of the tiny kingdom of Coorg ruled by King Chikka Virarajendra into the hands of the British East India Company. Masti describes the social, economic, political and cultural situation at that time and the methods used by the British to gain territorial control. The common theme in both works is the despotism and tyranny of the incumbent native rulers resulting in the intervention of a foreign power, which appears on the scene to restore order, but has its own imperialistic intentions.

Masti's other important stories are Navaratri ("Nine Nights") and his epic Sri Rama Pattabhishekha ("Rama's Coronation", 1972). The latter story begins with the end of the Ramayana war and the return of Rama, Sita and Lakshmana to Ayodhya. Rama, who is crowned as King of Ayodhya is elevated to the level of a "perfect man", who has overcome extreme difficulties, his personage being described through the viewpoint of several people who have been in close association with him.

A charismatic young writer, S. L. Bhyrappa made his presence felt from the 1960s with his first novel Dharmasri, though it was his Vamsavriksha ("Family Tree", 1966) that put him in the spotlight as one of Kannada's most popular novelists. It is a story of a respected scholar, Srinivasa Srotri, his family and their long-held values. The protagonist's young and widowed daughter-in-law wishes to remarry, putting his family tradition at risk. His best was yet to come with the Grihabhanga ("Breaking of a Home", 1970), a story of a woman who tries in vain to survive under tragic circumstances. The characters in the story are rustic and often use vulgar language. Other important novels are Datu ("Crossing", 1973) which portrays a harijan who revolts against the caste system, and Parva, a major work in Kannada fiction and an admirable attempt at recreating life on the sub-continent during the time of the epic Mahabharata.

Important women writers of the time were Tirumalamba, the first woman novelist; Anasuya Shankar (popularly known as Triveni), who authored the famous novel Sharapanjara or "Cage of Arrows"; and M. K. Indira, who offered insight into women's problems.

==== Pragatishila ====
For a short while, a simplistic form of fiction literature called Pragatishila (progressive), meant for the common man, gained popularity. The earliest writing in this style is ascribed to A. N. Krishna Rao ('Aa Na Kru') who portrayed an idealistic musician in Sandhyaraga (1935). The best-known writers in this class are Basavaraj Kattimani who celebrated the heroes of the Quit India Movement in Madi Madidavaru ("Those Who Did and Died"), the tenacity of a journalist in Jwalamuhkiyamele ("On the Volcano", 1951), and the rural atmosphere in Mannu mattu hennu ("Soil and Women"). His Mohada Baleyalli ("Caught in Passion") describes immorality in religious institutions.

T. R. Subba Rao dropped out of school to join the freedom struggle but later came under the influence of well known journalist S. K. Sharma and the passionate Kannada writer A. N. Krishna Rao. After a short stint as a journalist, Subba Rao took to writing short stories though his talent and consequent popularity was due to his novels. Subba Rao's numerous stories are intense and full of idealism but always with a human face. His early novels, Purushavatara and Munjavininda Munjavu concerned the problems of the underprivileged, the downtrodden and the outcaste.

A native of Chitradurga, many of Subba Rao's stories have this region as the backdrop, drawing on its rich history and the heroics of its Palegar chiefs. His later novels show an inclination towards philosophy, in contrast to his earlier atheist beliefs. Best known among his novels are Masanada Hoovu ("Flower from a Cemetery") a story about the plight of prostitutes, and historicals such as Durgasthamana and Hamsa Gite ("Swan Song"), a story about a dedicated musician of the late 18th century during annexation of Chitradurga by Tipu sultan.

==== Navya ====
It was Gokak who gave the call that the Navya (modernist) poetic era had arrived, with his Navya kavitegalu ("Modern Poems", 1950). With the passing of the Gandhi era and the influences it had upon the minds of people, a new era in which to express modern sensibilities had arrived. Gopalakrishna Adiga is considered the father of this expression with his Nadedu Banda Dari ("The Path Traversed", 1952) where he sought inspiration from T. S. Eliot and Auden. His other famous poems are Gondalapura ("Pandemonium", 1954), Bhoota (1959) and others.

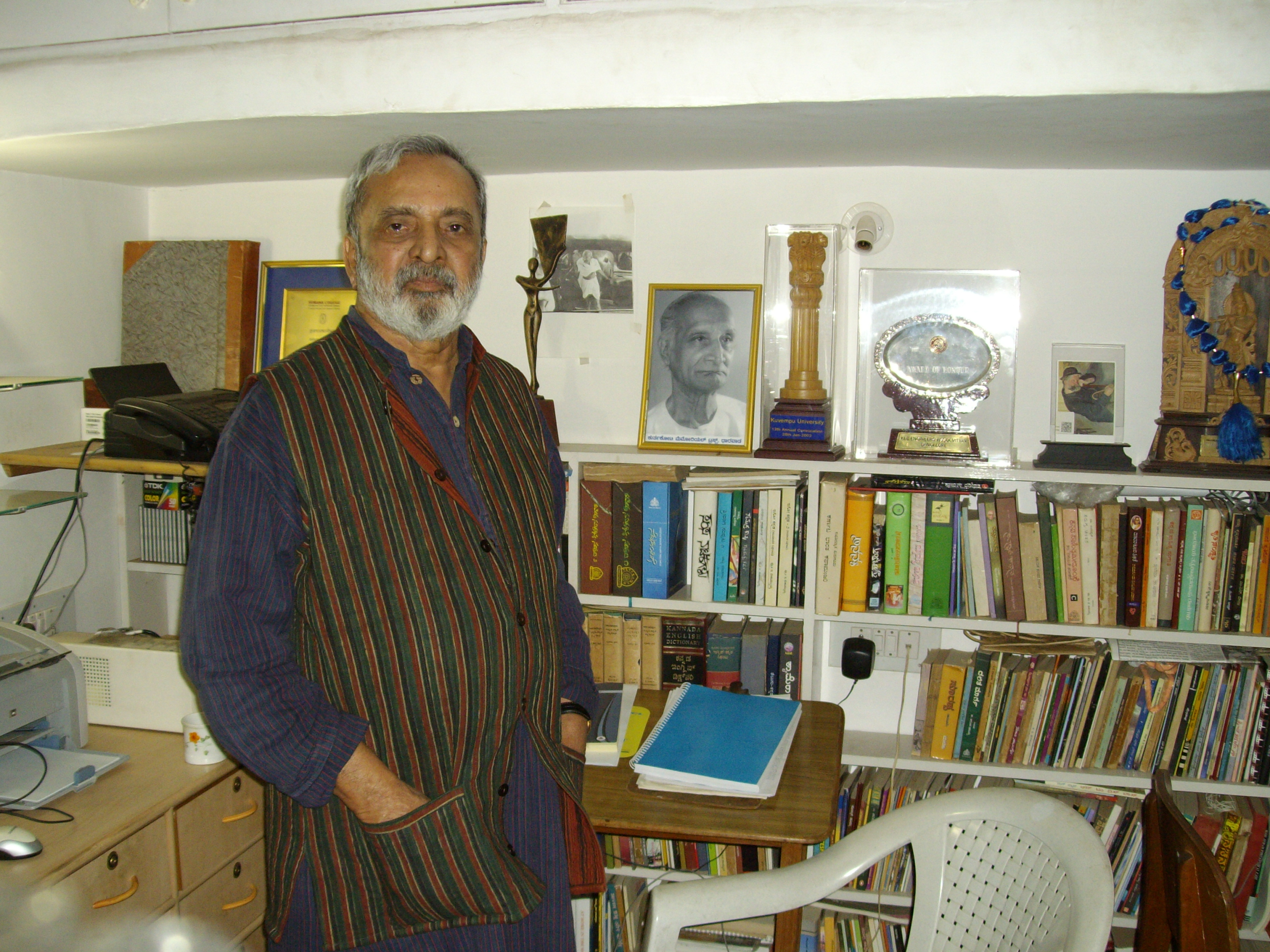
Novelist and Jnanapith awardee, U. R. Ananthamurthy.

Though he belonged to the earlier Navodaya generation in the Gokak mould, G. S. Shivarudrappa made his mark in the Navya period too. His Mumbai Jataka ("A Horoscope of Bombay", 1966) takes a closer look at urbanized society in Mumbai. A protege of Kuvempu, Shivarudrappa gained fame at the peak of the popularity of romantic poems with his Samagma ("Songs of Equanimity", 1951), poems which are known to have an idealistic bend. He continued to produce more poems in the same vein, such as Cheluvu Olavu ("Beauty and Truth", 1953) and Devashilpa ("Divine Sculpture", 1959), though in his later poems a gradual shift to social issues with a streak of admiration for god's creation is seen. As a critic, Shivarudrappa has authored several books, some about Kannada poets and others a comparison of eastern and western cultures, such as Vimarsheya Purva Paschima (1961), a critique on attitudes; Soundarya Samikshe (1969), on aesthetic values; and Mahakavya Swarupa (1971), on the practice of the epic form. His critical essay, Anuranana (1980), is about the Vachana poets of the 12th century, their tradition, style and influence on later poets.

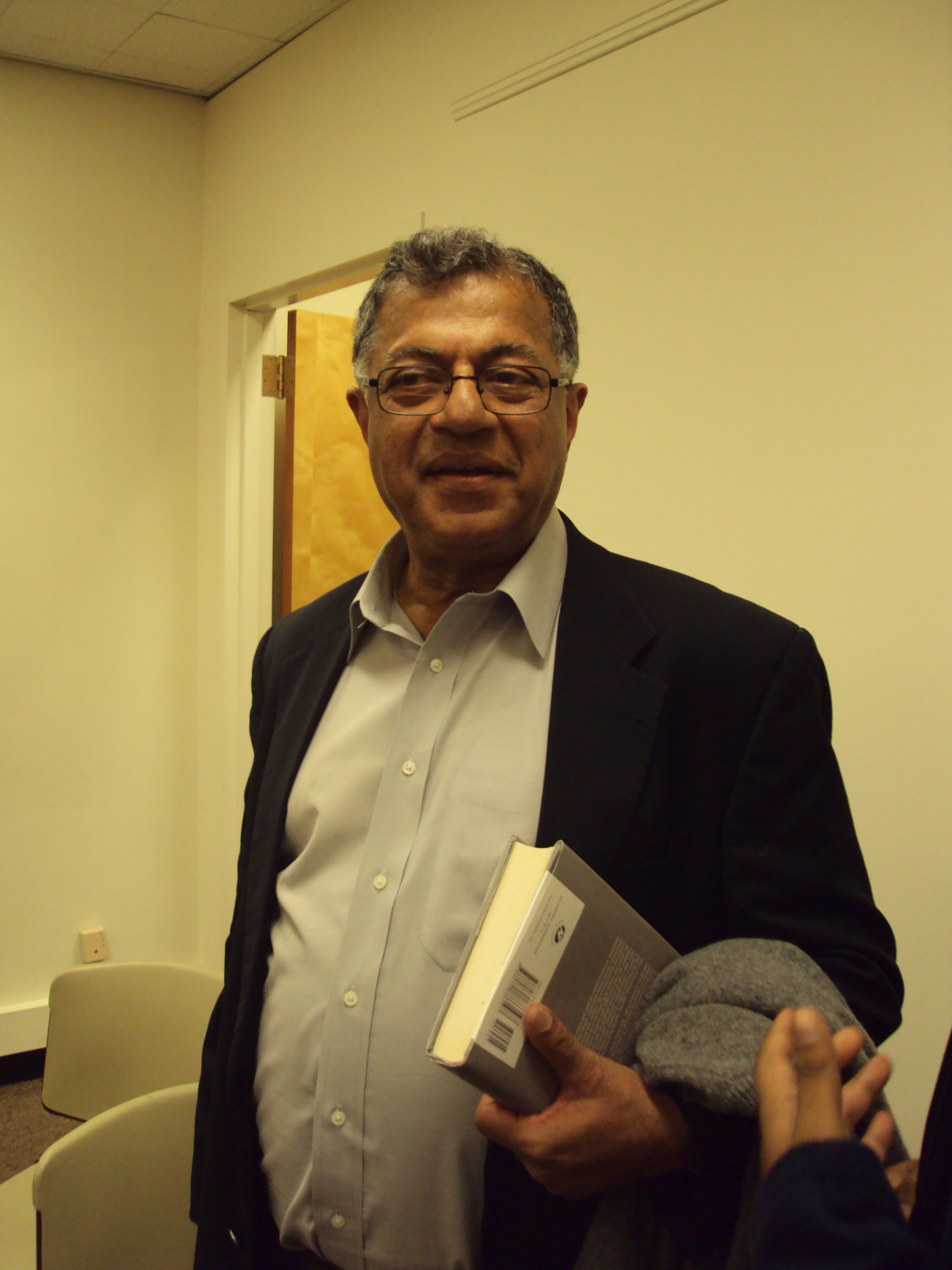
Kannada play write and Jnanapith awardee, Girish Karnad

K. S. Narasimhaswamy continued to be prominent in this era writing such landmark poems as Silalate ("The Sculptured Creeper", 1958), Tereda Bagilu ("The Open Door", 1972), Malligeya Male ("Jasmine Garland", 1986), Idadiru Nanna Ninna Simhasanada Mele ("Place me not on your Throne") and Gadiyaradangadiya Munde ("Before the Clock Shop"). Among the most well-known of later generation Navya poets are Chandrashekhara Kambar, Chandrashekar Patil, P. Lankesh, and K. S. Nissar Ahmed.

In the late 1950s, Sri Ranga produced several well-known dramas focussing more on the creator of society (man), in a dramatic style, than on social problems in his Kattale Belaku ("Darkness and Light", 1959) and Kelu Janamejaya ("Listen Janamejaya", 1960). In his effort to take his original plays to audiences outside Karnataka, he was helped by theatrical troupes such as the Karnataka Theatre of Bombay, Kannada Amateurs of Dharwad and even well known director-producers such B. V. Karanth.

Other outstanding playwrights from this period are Girish Karnad, P. Lankesh, Chandrashekara Kambar and Chandrashekar Patil. Karnad's Tughlaq (1964) portrays violence created by idealism gone astray. Considered an important creation in Kannada theatre, the play depicts the 14th century Sultan of Delhi, Mohammad Tughlaq in contrasting styles. On one hand the Sultan is a tyrannical and whimsical ruler, and on the other, an idealist who seeks the best for his subjects. Most plays written by Karnad have either history or mythology as their theme, with a focus on their relevance to modern society.

Kambara's Jokumaraswamy (1973) is perhaps the most popular amateur play in the language. It presents the conflict between a ruthless power and the popular revolt, leading to the death of the protagonist, the soil tiller. Kambara is best known for his insight and his ability to bring the folk element into his plays. Lankesh's Sankranthi (1973) brings out the tumultuous events of the late 12th century, during the rise of the Lingayat faith and the struggle of Brahminism in this period. The presentation includes disputations between the saint-poet Basavanna and his patron King Bijalla II.

The Navya novel was launched by Shantinath Desai with his Mukti (1961) which narrates the protagonist's quest for an independent identity, liberation from his dependence on a friend and his infatuation for the friend's sister. His second novel, Vikshepa (1971), tells the story of a village youth from northern Karnataka who attempts to flee from his traditional environment by studying English in Bombay and later flee to England. An English translation was published recently. Veena Shanteshwar brings feminine sensibilities to her novels, notable among them being Mullugalu ("Throns", 1968) and Koneya Dari ("The Final Choice", 1972)

However, the most acclaimed classic in this genre was the Samskara by U.R.Anantha Murthy (1965). The novel narrates the search for a new identity and values by the protagonist, a Brahmin, who has sexual intercourse with the untouchable mistress of his heretical adversary. Another notable work is the Swarupa (1966) by Poornachandra Tejaswi.

In the genre of short stories, writers who are best known are U. R. Anantha Murthy, Yashwant Chittal, P. Lankesh, Ramachandra Sharma, Shantinath Desai, Rajalakshmi Rao and K.Sadashiva. Anantha Murthy's Prasne (1963) contains his best collection of short stories including Ghatashraddha, which describes from a boy's point of view the tragedy that befalls a young pregnant widow. His collection Mouni (1973) includes the stories Navilugulu ("Peacocks") and Clip Joint. In addition, using his strong background in English literature, Anantha Murthy has made useful contributions as a poet, a playwright and most influentially, as a critic in shaping the direction of modern Kannada criticism.

==== Navyottara ====
From the early 1970s, a change is seen in the output of novels and stories, an anti-Navya reaction by writers, many of whom were themselves Navya writers. This genre, called Navyottara (post modernist), sought to fulfill a more socially responsible role. Most well known in this form of writing are Poornachandra Tejaswi and Devanur Mahadeva. Tejaswi moved away from his initial foray in poetry to writing novels, a move that won him accolades in the form of the "most creative novel of the year" for his Karvalo in 1980 and Chidambara Rahasya in 1985. His best-known short stories are Abachurina Post office ("The Post Office at Abachur", 1970) narrating the repercussions of setting up a post office at Abachur, Kubi mattu Iyala which is about a doctor who combats the superstitions of villagers and the Tabarana Kathe ("Tabara's Story") which decries bureaucracy. Most of his literature is related to nature, conservation and the farmers. Mahadeva's Marikondavaru ("Those who sold themselves") and Mudala Seemeli Kole Gile Ityadi ("Murder in the Eastern Region") effectively portray a realistic account of the life of dalits.
