= Hamsageethe =

- Directed by: G. V. Iyer
- Written by: T. R. Subba Rao
- Screenplay by: G. V. Iyer
- Produced by: G. V. Iyer
- Starring: Anant Nag; M. V. Narayana Rao; Rekha Rao; B. V. Karanth; Mysore Mutt; Vasudev Girimaji
- Cinematography: Nemai Ghosh
- Edited by: V. R. K. Prasad
- Music by: M. Balamuralikrishna; Background score: B. V. Karanth
- Distributed by: Ananthalakshmi Films
- Release date: 17 August 1975
- Running time: 150 minutes
- Country: India
- Language: Kannada

Hamsageethe (transl. The Swan Song) is a 1975 Indian feature film in the Kannada language. It was directed by G. V. Iyer, based on a novel by T. R. Subba Rao with Anant Nag and Rekha Rao in lead roles.

The film won 2 National Film Awards; the National Film Award for Kannada film and National Award for Best Male Playback singer (M. Balamuralikrishna) at the 23rd National Film Awards.

Hamsa Geethe, the novel by Ta Ra Su was made into a Hindi film, Basant Bahar in 1956. The novel is supposedly based on the real-life story of the 18th-century Carnatic musician Bhairavi Venkatasubbaiah.

== Cast ==
- Anant Nag as Bhairavi Venkatasubbiah
- M. V. Narayana Rao
- Rekha Rao
- G. S. Rama Rao
- B. V. Karanth
- Mysore Mutt
- Vasudev Girimaji
- G. V. Iyer
- RS Krishnaswamy as Tipu Sultan
- Cudavalli Chandrashekar

== Awards ==
- 23rd National Film Awards
  - Best Feature Film in Kannada
  - Best Male Playback singer - M. Balamuralikrishna
- Karnataka State Film Awards 1975-76
  - Second Best Film
  - Best Music Director - M. Balamuralikrishna, B. V. Karanth
  - Best Cinematographer - Nemai Ghosh

This film screened at 11th IFFI for 50 years of playback singing.
