= Zehreela Insaan =

1974 film by Puttanna Kanagal

- Poster
- Directed by: Puttanna Kanagal
- Story by: T. R. Subba Rao
- Produced by: Virendra Sinha
- Starring: Rishi Kapoor; Moushumi Chatterjee; Neetu Singh; Pran
- Cinematography: Sudarshan Nag & S. N. Dubey
- Edited by: V. P. Krishna
- Music by: R. D. Burman
- Production company: Pragati Chitra International
- Release date: 20 November 1974
- Running time: 146 minutes
- Country: India
- Language: Hindi

Zehreela Insaan (transl. Poisonous human) is a 1974 Indian Hindi-language romance film directed by Puttanna Kanagal and produced by Virendra Sinha. The film stars Rishi Kapoor, Moushumi Chatterjee, Neetu Singh and Pran. It is a remake of Kanagal's own 1972 Kannada film Naagarahaavu which was based on three Kannada novels: Nagarahavu, Ondu Gandu Eradu Hennu and Sarpa Mathsara, all written by T. R. Subba Rao.

== Plot ==
Arjun is an ill-tempered but soft-hearted man whom others view as a bad person. His teacher (Masterji) is the only person who understands him and appreciates his good qualities so Arjun obeys him.

Arjun loves Aarti and wants to marry her, but Aarti's father opposes this alliance and forcibly marries her off to a man of his choice.

Arjun is dejected, and soon finds love in Margaret, his Christian college mate. While on a business trip to another city, Arjun finds that Aarti is a high society call girl.

Margaret's uncle and mother are against her marrying Arjun. Arjun and Margaret flee to the hills; Masterji catches up with them and tries to pacify Arjun, but refuses and accidentally pushes him down the hill to his death. Traumatised, Arjun asks Margaret if she will join him and both jump to their deaths.

== Cast ==
- Rishi Kapoor as Arjun Singh
- Moushumi Chatterjee as Aarti
- Neetu Singh as Margaret
- Pran as Masterji
- Dara Singh as Pahelwan
- Manorama as Mary
- Dulari as Arjun's mother
- Ratnamala as Mrs. Shyam Lal
- Madan Puri as John
- Iftekhar as Principal Vishamber Nath
- Raj Mehra as Arjun's father
- Sajjan as Shyam Lal
- Asit Sen as Murari Lal
- Paintal as Ranjeet
- Ghanshyam Rohera as Arjun's classmate
- Maruti Rao as Budhram
- Jagdish Raj as Bidre
- Vijay Kumar
- Nirupa Roy as Shobha
- Ambareesh as Jaleel
- Yogesh Chhabra as Tukaram Phillips

== Production ==
Zehreela Insaan is a remake of the 1972 Kannada film Naagarahaavu, itself based on three different novels: Nagarahavu, Ondu Gandu Eradu Hennu and Sarpa Mathsara by T. R. Subba Rao. Puttanna Kanagal, who directed the Kannada film, returned to direct the Hindi remake, which was produced by Virendra Sinha under Pragati Chitra International. Cinematography was handled by Sudarshan Nag, and the editing by V. P. Krishna. Ambareesh, who played a character named Jaleel in Naagarahaavu, reprised his role in Zehreela Insaan. Much of the film was shot in Chitradurga, with the song "O Hansini" being shot at Chitradurga Fort.

== Soundtrack ==
The soundtrack was composed by R. D. Burman while the lyrics were written by Majrooh Sultanpuri. The song "Saanp Se Badhke" is based on "Haavina Dwesha" from Naagarahaavu. It was released on His Master's Voice.

Track listing
| No. | Title | Singer(s) | Length |
|---|---|---|---|
| 1. | "O Hansini" | Kishore Kumar | 05:23 |
| 2. | "Dum Tumhari Dum" | Kishore Kumar | 04:19 |
| 3. | "Ye Silsila" | Asha Bhosle | 04:17 |
| 4. | "Suno Kahani" | Lata Mangeshkar | 04:56 |
| 5. | "Saanp Se Badhke" | Shailendra Singh | 03:20 |
| 6. | "Mere Dil Se Ye Nain" | Shailendra Singh, Asha Bhosle | 04:19 |

== Release and reception ==
Zehreela Insaan was released on 20 November 1974, and did not succeed commercially. Rishi Kapoor later admitted it was a "mistake", feeling that he should have accepted a film similar to his earlier Bobby (1973) and not something that was "drastically different".

== See also ==
- Kode Nagu
- Raja Nagam

== Bibliography ==
- Dharap, B. V. (1974). Indian Films. Motion Picture Enterprises.
- Kishore, Vikrant; Sarwal, Amit; Patra, Parichay, eds. (2016). Salaam Bollywood: Representations and interpretations. Routledge. ISBN 978-1-138-64962-0.
- Rajadhyaksha, Ashish; Willemen, Paul (1998) [1994]. Encyclopaedia of Indian Cinema (PDF). British Film Institute and Oxford University Press. ISBN 0-19-563579-5.
