= 1972–73 Karnataka State Film Awards =

Annual Indian film awards ceremony

The Karnataka State Film Awards 1972–73, presented by Government of Karnataka, felicitated the best of Kannada Cinema films released in the year 1972.

== Film awards ==
Name of Award	Film	Producer	Director
First Best Film	Sankalpa	P. V. Nanjaraja Urs	P. V. Nanjaraja Urs
Second Best Film	Naagarahaavu	N. Veeraswamy	S. R. Puttanna Kanagal
Third Best Film			
Fourth Best Film	Hrudaya Sangama	H. N. Muddukrishna	Rashi Brothers

== Other awards ==
Name of Award	Film	Awardee(s)
Best Direction	Sankalpa	P. V. Nanjaraja Urs
Best Actor	Naagarahaavu	Vishnuvardhan
Best Actress	Naagarahaavu	Aarathi
Best Supporting Actor	Naagarahaavu	K. S. Ashwath
Best Supporting Actress	Naagarahaavu	Shubha
Best Child Actress	Sankalpa	Brunda
Best Music Direction	Sankalpa	Vijaya Bhaskar
Best Cinematography	Sankalpa	S. Ramachandra
Best Editing	Sankalpa	Umesh Kulakarni
Best Sound Recording	Sankalpa	• Seetharam • D. Mohan Sundaram
Best Story Writer	Naagarahaavu	T. R. Subba Rao
Best Screenplay	Naagarahaavu	S. R. Puttanna Kanagal
Best Dialogue Writer	Naagarahaavu	Chi. Udaya Shankar
