= Nagu (disambiguation) =

Nagu is a former municipality in Finland.

Nagu or NAGU may also refer to:

- Kode Nagu, Indian film
- Mary Nagu, Tanzanian politician
- Notice Advisory to Galileo Users
