= Raja Nagam =

1974 film by N. S. Manian

- Film poster
- Directed by: N. S. Manian
- Screenplay by: N. S. Manian
- Story by: T. R. Subba Rao
- Produced by: N. S. Manian
- Starring: Srikanth; Manjula; Shubha; Major Sundarrajan
- Cinematography: Chandrasekharan
- Edited by: R. Devarajan
- Music by: V. Kumar
- Production company: Jagajothi Pictures
- Distributed by: Jayam Combines
- Release date: 25 July 1974
- Country: India
- Language: Tamil

Raja Nagam (/ˈrɑːdʒə ˌnɑːɡəm/ transl. King cobra) is a 1974 Indian Tamil-language romantic drama film written, produced and directed by N. S. Manian. It is a remake of the Kannada film Naagarahaavu (1972) which was based on three Kannada novels written by T. R. Subba Rao: Nagarahavu, Ondu Gandu Eradu Hennu and Sarpa Mathsara. The film stars Srikanth, Manjula, Shubha and Major Sundarrajan. It was released on 25 July 1974 and became a commercial success, with Shubha winning the Chennai Film Fans' Association Award for Best Supporting Actress.

== Plot ==
Krishnamurthi is a short-tempered, but well-meaning college student. His father dislikes him because he is unpopular in the town as a ruffian. His mother is worried about his future. One person who truly understands Krishnamurthi is his primary school teacher, called "Vaathiyar" (teacher). Krishnamurthi finds the company of his teacher and his wife more interesting than that of his parents and considers them as his parents. Krishnamurthi has high regard for Vaathiyar even though he is no longer his academic teacher and would do whatever his teacher would say without thinking.

Krishnamurthi meets his friend Varadarajan Iyengar's sister Alamelu. Her beauty has maddened a neighbourhood hooligan, who stalks her. After Alamelu complains to Varada about this, Varada seeks to end the eve teasing but he is a timid, pusillanimous person. He asks Krishnamurthi for help. Krishnamurthi agrees based on the condition that he should marry Alamelu. Krishnamurthi fights the hooligan and drives him away from Alamelu's life. Alamelu and Krishnamurthi fall in love.

Although Alamelu and Krishnamurthi are truly in love, Alamelu's marriage is fixed with a man of her caste. When Alamelu tries to refuse the proposal by saying she is in love with Krishnamurthi and asks for Varada's support, Varada says that he never gave Krishnamurthi any promise and deceives Krishnamurthi. Vaathiyar tells Krishnamurthi to give up hope on Alamelu, convincing him that sacrifice is a greater act than selfish love; Krishnamurthi assents. He later reciprocates the feelings of Margaret, his college mate. As time passes, he overcomes Alamelu and devotes himself to Margaret.

While on a trip to another place, Krishnamurthi meets Alamelu in a five-star hotel as a prostitute; she reveals that her husband sold her into flesh trade and she had turned into a prostitute, and upon realising that Krishnamurthi loves Margaret, advises him not to leave her. After Krishnamurthi returns to his town and decides to marry Margaret, their families object to this because Krishnamurthi is an Iyer and Margaret is a Christian. As a result, Krishnamurthi and Margaret decide to flee through the hills.

Vaathiyar catches up and tells Krishnamurthi that by sacrificing his love for Margaret, he will be holding his religion and tradition before love. Krishnamurthi says he will not assent because the last time he did, it went wrong and Alamelu became a prostitute. Vaathiyar, accused now of ruining Alamelu's life, realises that Krishnamurthi was right and he was wrong. However, he says Krishnamurthi's parents will still not agree to the marriage. Krishnamurthi decides to leave with Margaret to another town and Vaathiyar tries to stop him, but Krishnamurthi accidentally pushes him down the hill to his death. Remorseful, Krishnamurthi asks Margaret if she will join him where he goes; she says she will, and both jump to their deaths.

== Cast ==
- Srikanth as Krishnamurthi
- Manjula as Alamelu
- Shubha as Margaret
- Major Sundarrajan as Vaathiyar
- Thengai Srinivasan as Varadaraja Iyengar
- S. V. Sahasranamam
- V. Gopalakrishnan
- K. Kannan as Margaret's uncle
- Ennathe Kannaiah
- S. R. Veeraraghavan
- I. S. R.
- M. N. Rajam as an orthodox mother
- Sukumari as Alamelu's mother
- S. A. Ashokan (guest appearance)
- Suruli Rajan (guest appearance)
- Manorama as Margaret's mother

== Production ==
Raja Nagam is a remake of the Kannada film Naagarahaavu (1972), itself based on three different novels: Nagarahavu, Ondu Gandu Eradu Hennu and Sarpa Mathsara, all written by T. R. Subba Rao. The remake was directed by N. S. Manian, who also produced the film under Jagajothi Pictures, and wrote the screenplay. Srikanth's role as the male lead Krishnamurthi was a departure from the villainous roles he was generally known for. Shubha, who portrayed Margaret in Nagarahavu, reprised her role. Cinematography was handled by Chandrasekharan, and editing by R. Devarajan. The film was prominently shot at Bhuvanagiri Fort. The final length of the film was 3,789.27 metres (12,432.0 ft).

== Soundtrack ==
The soundtrack was composed by V. Kumar, while the lyrics were written by Vaali. "Devan Yesuvin Vedam" (also known as "Devan Vedhamum Kannan Geethaiyum") became the film's most popular song.

Track listing
No.	Title	Singer(s)	Length
1.	"Dhevan Vedhamum"	P. Susheela, S. P. Balasubrahmanyam
2.	"Mannavan Thottanadi"	P. Susheela
3.	"Samudhaya Veedhiyile"	P. Susheela
4.	"Manavan Ninaithal"	T. M. Soundararajan

== Release and reception ==
Raja Nagam was released on 25 July 1974, and was distributed by Jayam Combines. Kanthan of Kalki praised the film for the cast performances, Manian's dialogues and direction, and the cinematography. It was a commercial success, running for over 100 days in theatres. Shubha went on to win the Chennai Film Fans' Association Award for Best Supporting Actress.

== See also ==
- Kode Nagu
- Zehreela Insaan
