= Hamsa Geethe (novel) =

Book by T. R. Subba Rao

- Author: T. R. Subba Rao
- Language: Kannada
- Genre: Fiction
- Published: 1952
- Publication place: India
- Media type: Print (Hardcover & Paperback)

Hamsa Geethe is a 1952 Kannada novel by T. R. Subba Rao about the life of an Indian classical musician in the context of Chitradurga being passed from the hands of the Palegaras to Tippu Sultan. The 1956 Hindi film, Basant Bahar, and the 1975 Kannada film Hamsageethe are based on this novel. It contains good descriptions of Chitradurga's fort and its history.
