= Chandavalliya Thota =

1964 film

- DVD cover
- Directed by: T. V. Singh Thakur
- Written by: T. R. Subba Rao
- Based on: Chandavalliya Thota by T. R. Subba Rao
- Produced by: Pals & Company
- Starring: Rajkumar; Udaykumar; Jayanthi; Rajasree
- Cinematography: B. Dorairaj
- Edited by: Venkatram; Raghupathy
- Music by: T. G. Lingappa
- Production companies: Pals & Co.
- Release date: 1964
- Running time: 145 minutes
- Country: India
- Language: Kannada

Chandavalliya Thota is a 1964 Indian Kannada language film directed by T. V. Singh Thakur. It stars Rajkumar, Udaykumar and Jayanthi. The film was released on 24 June 1964 and ran for over 100 days at Prabhat Cinema in Bangalore. The film won several awards upon its release, including the National Film Award for Best Feature Film in Kannada for its Gandhian theme and its treatment of the poverty in rural Indian villages. The movie is based on the novel of same name by Ta.Ra.Su. This film marked the Kannada debut of singer K. J. Yesudas. It was a huge hit.

== Plot ==
Through the efforts of two close friends and respected village leaders, Sivananjay Gowda and Naraharappa, a coconut grove is created to bring greenery and coolness to an arid village. Gowda, the grove's owner, follows the advice of his astrologer and offers the grove as a “daan” (gift) to his friend Narahari in an attempt to escape his impending doom. However, a priest and his wife plot to seize the grove. They are joined by Kariyappa, a local tramp with evil intentions to take all that Gowda owns. The schemers manipulate Rama, Gowda’s estranged son, and even orchestrate his marriage to Lakshmi. Eventually, they succeed in sowing discord within the family, leading to a separation. Rama demands and receives most of the property, which he quickly squanders.

== Cast ==
- Rajkumar as Hanuman, Sivananjay Gowda's first son
- Udaykumar as Sivananjay Gowda
- Jayanthi as Cheney
- Rajasree as Champa
- Balakrishna as Kariyappa
- Raghavendra Rao
- Advani Lakshmi Devi as Lakshmi
- M. Jayashree as Puttathayi, Sivananjay Gowda's wife
- Shanthamma as Parvathi, Naraharappan's wife
- Sharadamma as Papamma, priest's wife

== Soundtrack ==
The music was composed by T. G. Lingappa, with lyrics by R. N. Jayagopal and Ta Ra Su.

Track listing
No.	Title	Lyrics	Singer(s)	Length
1.	"Oh Nanna Bandhavare"	Ta Ra Su	Nageswara Rao Pantulu
2.	"Ondaguva Mundaguva"	R. N. Jayagopal	K. J. Yesudas, L. R. Eswari
3.	"Suma Baleya Premada"	R. N. Jayagopal	L. R. Eswari
4.	"Balli Hange"	R. N. Jayagopal	P. B. Sreenivas, S. Janaki
5.	"Ee Neethi Ee Nyaya"	R. N. Jayagopal	P. B. Sreenivas
6.	"Namma Maneye Nandana"	Ta Ra Su	S. Janaki

== Awards ==
- National Film Award for Best Feature Film in Kannada - 1964

This film screened at IFFI 1992 Kannada cinema Retrospect.
