= Kode Nagu =

1974 film directed by K. S. Prakash Rao

- Poster
- Directed by: K. S. Prakash Rao
- Story by: T. R. Subba Rao
- Produced by: M. S. Reddy
- Starring: Sobhan Babu; Lakshmi; Chandrakala; Jaggayya
- Cinematography: K. S. Prasad
- Edited by: K. A. Marthand
- Music by: Pendyala
- Production company: Kowmudi Pictures
- Distributed by: Vijaya Pictures
- Release date: 15 March 1974
- Running time: 154 minutes
- Country: India
- Language: Telugu

Kode Nagu (transl. Young cobra; also spelt Kode Naagu) is a 1974 Indian Telugu-language romance film directed by K. S. Prakash Rao and produced by M. S. Reddy. It is a remake of the Kannada film Naagarahaavu (1972) which was based on three Kannada novels: Nagarahavu, Ondu Gandu Eradu Hennu and Sarpa Mathsara, all written by T. R. Subba Rao. The film stars Sobhan Babu, Lakshmi, Chandrakala and Jaggayya. It was released on 15 March 1974.

== Plot ==
A Hindu man and a Christian woman are in love. However, upon realising they cannot be united in matrimony due to caste and class barriers, commit suicide.

== Cast ==
- Sobhan Babu
- Lakshmi
- Chandrakala
- Jaggayya

== Production ==
Kode Nagu is a remake of the Kannada film Naagarahaavu (1972), itself based on three Kannada novels: Nagarahavu, Ondu Gandu Eradu Hennu and Sarpa Mathsara, all written by T. R. Subba Rao. It was directed by K. S. Prakash Rao, and produced by M. S. Reddy under Kowmudi Pictures. The dialogues were written by Aatreya. Cinematography was handled by K. S. Prasad, and the editing by K. A. Marthand.

== Soundtrack ==
The soundtrack was composed by Pendyala, while the lyrics were written by Acharya Aatreya and M. S. Reddy (under the name Mallemala).

Track listing
No.	Title	Singer(s)	Length
1.	"Sangamam Sangamam"	Ghantasala, P. Susheela	4:40
2.	"Idhe Chandragiri"	Ghantasala	4:04
3.	"Andaala Gadasarivaadu"	P. Susheela	4:07
4.	"Naagupamu Paga"	Ghantasala	2:52
5.	"Naalo Kalisi Po"	Ghantasala	4:51
6.	"Katha Vinduva"	P. Susheela	4:18

== Release ==
Kode Nagu was released on 15 March 1974, and was distributed by Vijaya Pictures.

== See also ==
- Raja Nagam
- Zehreela Insaan
