= Vishalakshi Dakshinamurthy =

Indian writer-novelist (born 1935)

- Born: Vishalakshi; 16 November 1935; Challakere, Mysore State, British India
- Occupation: Writer
- Children: 3, including D. Mangala Priyadarshini
- Relatives: T. R. Subba Rao (uncle), Chi. Udayashankar (relative)
- Writing career
- Pen name: Vishalakshi Dakshinamurthy
- Period: 1950–present
- Genres: Novels, non-fiction, classical
- Subject: Non-fiction
- Notable work: Vyapthi-Prapthi
- Notable awards: Rajyotsava Award

Vishalakshi Dakshinamurthy is an Indian novelist who writes in Kannada. Her novel Vyapthi-Prapthi which was adapted into the film Jeevana Chaitra.

In 2008, she received the Bhuvaneshwari award at the Kannada Sahitya Parashat.
