= Chakra Theertha =

- Poster
- Directed by: Peketi Sivaram
- Based on: Chakra Theertha by T. R. Subba Rao
- Starring: Rajkumar; Udaykumar; Jayanthi; Balakrishna
- Cinematography: R. Chittibabu
- Edited by: P. Bhakthavathsalam
- Music by: T. G. Lingappa
- Production company: Sri Bhagavathi Productions
- Release date: 1967
- Running time: 151 minutes
- Country: India
- Language: Kannada

Chakra Theertha is a 1967 Indian Kannada-language film, directed by Peketi Sivaram. The film stars Rajkumar, Udaykumar, Jayanthi and Balakrishna, with musical score by T. G. Lingappa. It is based on the novel of same name by T. R. Subba Rao. The film was remade in Telugu as Chuttarikaalu in 1968, also directed by Peketi Sivaram.

== Cast ==
- Rajkumar as Damodara
- Udaykumar as Kashipathaiah
- Jayanthi as Kamala, Kashipathaiah's daughter
- Balakrishna
- B. M. Venkatesh
- Ganapathi Bhat
- Dr. Sheshagiri Rao
- Rajanand
- Ramaraje Urs
- Master Prabhakar
- Jayashree
- Shanthaladevi
- Baby Raji
- Madhavi

== Soundtrack ==
The music was composed by T. G. Lingappa. The song Ninna Roopa Kannali was retained in the Telugu version as Neeve Naa Kanulalo.

No.	Song	Singers	Lyrics	Length (m:ss)
1	"Eko Ee Pulaka"	P. B. Sreenivas, S. Janaki	R. N. Jayagopal	03:29
2	"Hagalu Hariyithu"	P. Nageswara Rao		03:16
3	"O Beli Leso"	P. Nageswara Rao	Ta. Ra. Su	03:17
4	"Kuniyonu Bara Kuniyonu"	L. R. Eswari	Dr. Bendre	03:30
5	"Ninna Roopa Kannali"	P. Susheela, P. B. Sreenivas	R. N. Jayagopal	04:38
6	"Ninninda Neenendoo Hagalirulu"	P. B. Sreenivas, S. Janaki	R. N. Jayagopal	04:08
7	"Odi Baa"	B. K. Sumitra, Bangalore Latha	R. N. Jayagopal	03:27
8	"Vidhiyu Thaleda Kopa"	P B Srinivas	R. N. Jayagopal	03:31
