= Pragatisheela =

Form of literature in Kannada language

Pragatishila (Kannada: ಪ್ರಗತಿಶೀಲ is a form of literature in Kannada language. It is one of the five forms of modern Kannada literature, the other four being Navodaya, Navya, Dalita and Bandaya. Pragatishila which literally means Progressive, is a simplistic form of fiction literature meant for the common man. It gained the popularity for a short period of time.

== Prominent writers ==
Some of the important writers in this form of literature were A.N. Krishna Rao (A.Na.Kru), Basavaraj Kattimani, T.R. Subba Rao (Ta Ra Su) and Chaduranga and Niranjana Kulakanda Shivaraya.
