= Beechi =

Indian writer and humorist

Rayasam Bheemasena Rao
- Born: Rayasam Bheemasena Rao; 23 April 1913; Harapanahalli, Vijayanagara District, Karnataka, India
- Died: 7 December 1980 (aged 67)
- Writing career
- Pen name: ಬೀchi
- Period: 1913–1980

Rayasam Bheemasena Rao (known by his pen name BeeChi) (1913–1980) was a well-known humorist in the Kannada language. He preferred to write his pen name bilingually as ಬೀchi giving first preference to Kannada than English. He was also known as Karnataka's George Bernard Shaw.

== Early life and career ==
Beechi was born in 1913 in Harapanahalli of then His father was Srinivas Rao and mother was Bharatamma. He discontinued studies after SSLC and joined a Government office as an attender. He later worked for the CID for a substantial amount of time. He was married to Seetabai.

== Motivation ==
Having no formal exposure to Kannada or its literature, Beechi was motivated towards Kannada literature after reading A. N. Krishna Rao's novel Sandhyaraga (ಸಂಧ್ಯಾರಾಗ) on a long train journey. He considered A. N. Krishna Rao as his guru. In Beechi's own words:

"I started reading Sandhyaraga by placing the book inside the folds of the Illustrated Weekly paper. I remember only that I started to read. I don't know how many times my eyes went moist and how many times my heart skipped beats; but I woke up only after completely reading the book."

== Literature ==
Beechi's writings were humour-based, and his first novel was Dasakoota, published when he was 32. Dasakoota is the tale of a man(Umesh) fed up with the subservience of, at the surface, government employees to corruption, but relates to the broad servitude of men to conservatism. The protagonist undergoes many travails in his life, working under corrupt superiors, faced with the prospect of a father remarrying a very young woman who will be his stepmother, eventually even joining Subhas Chandra Bose's ("Netaji") Indian National Army (INA) briefly. Scenarios with characters getting enmeshed in trouble inadvertently are created cleverly in the story. For example, after returning from imprisonment due to his participation in the freedom struggle in the ranks of Bose's army, Umesh is sitting at home and drinking coffee. When he finds it bitter, he asks for some sugar. Just then, news arrives announcing that Mohandas K. Gandhi has been assassinated. When rioters break into their house, they see Umesh consuming sugar. Thinking he is celebrating the Mahatma's death, they go on a rampage inside. Refreshing, original and daring, the novel brought Beechi much fame, being a startlingly confident debut, and he went on to more, perhaps greater, works.

His primary character/alter-ego was timma (timma being a name colloquially used in Kannada to denote a man who is considered SIMPLETON). Beechi released a lot of books with timma in the title. Churning out novels at a prolific rate, he wrote around 60 books in his lifetime.

His autobiography, entitled Nanna bhayagraphy (ನನ್ನ ಭಯಾಗ್ರಫ಼ಿ – the title is a pun on the words biography and the Kannada word Bhaya, meaning scary), met with some controversy upon its release. References within the book to Omar Khayyam's 'Rubaiyyat' and how the great Kannada poet G. P. Rajaratnam seemed to have been inspired by it greatly sparked much anger in Rajaratnam and his admirers (Rajaratnam is said to have written his 'Nirbhayagraphy' (ನಿರ್ಭಯಾಗ್ರಫ಼ಿ) in protest). Nanna bhayagraphy is perhaps Beechi's most philosophical work. Detailing his life in necessary, but not excruciating, detail, it amuses, provokes, depresses and ultimately enlightens the reader (the ideal autobiography, in many ways). Despite the painful losses he suffered early on in his life and the unpleasant experiences he subsequently underwent—his father dying as soon as he was born(this is described in a heartbreakingly light manner in the very first chapter), the lack of money to pay his school fees and the indifference of his relatives when he asked for their help ("Who's going to cry if you don't study? I don't have spare money to pay your school fees. Go away now."), the petty casteist bickerings in his village(it was divided into small localities, or keris – pronounced cay-ri and not kerry—based on caste. Members of one keri never crossed over into another unless it was inevitable.), his practically lifelong struggle with alcoholism and the troubles and patience of his family when dealing with this, the loss of his son and the trauma of having to light his own son's pyre—Beechi is never bitter about his lot. The tone is one of endurance, forgiveness and understanding. And the humour in the book is never forced, never awkward or inappropriate. (Beechi is never inhibited, though. In an early chapter, he describes how all the teenage boys of his village would go up to a nearby hill and indulge in masturbation. In another, he narrates how an elderly widow of the village tries to get her widowed daughter to seduce a young Beechi and how he escaped that situation. Both incidents are peppered with humour and make for delightful reading; not in the least bit vulgar.) It comes from a man who has seen it all and understood what life should be about. The last paragraph of the book, perhaps one of the most memorable pieces of writing in Kannada, expresses his philosophy of life.

== Bibliography ==
Cover photo of novel Elliruve Tande Baro

=== Humorous novels ===
- AagishTu, EegishTu (ಆಗಿಷ್ಟು ,ಈಗಿಷ್ಟು)
- Aaru Elu Sthree Soukhya (ಅರು ಏಳು ಸ್ತ್ರೀ ಸೌಖ್ಯ)
- Ammaavra KaalguNa (ಅಮ್ಮಾವ್ರ ಕಾಲ್ಗುಣ)
- Andanaa Timma (ಅಂದನಾ ತಿಂಮ)
- Arida Chaha (ಆರಿದ ಚಹ)
- Auto (ಆಟೋ)
- Bangaarada Katthe (ಬಂಗಾರದ ಕತೆ)
- Beechi Bulletin (ಬೀಚಿ ಬುಲೆಟಿನ್)
- Belli Maathregalu (ಬೆಳ್ಳಿ ಮಾತ್ರೆಗಳು)
- BeLLi Timma NoorenTu HeLida (ಬೆಳ್ಳಿ ತಿಂಮ ನೂರೆಂಟು ಹೇಳಿದ)
- Belli Patragalu (ಬೆಳ್ಳಿ ಪತ್ರಗಳು)
- Bengalooru Bassu (ಬೆಂಗಳೂರು ಬಸ್ಸು)
- Bittidde Bevu (ಬಿತ್ತಿದ್ದೆ ಬೇವು)
- Brahmachari (ಬ್ರಹ್ಮಚಾರಿ)
- Brahmachariya Maga (ಬ್ರಹ್ಮಚಾರಿಯ ಮಗ)
- Bulletsu, Bombsu, Bhagavadgeete (Bullets-ಉ, bombs-ಉ, ಭಗವದ್ಗೀತೆ)
- Chinnada Kasa (ಚಿನ್ನದ ಕಸ)
- Daasa KooTa (ದಾಸ ಕೂಟ)
- Devana HenDa (ದೇವನ ಹೆಂಡ)
- Devarillada Gudi (ದೇವರಿಲ್ಲದ ಗುಡಿ)
- Elliruve Tande Baaro (ಎಲ್ಲಿರುವೆ ತಂದೆ ಬಾರೋ)
- Erada BaLe (ಏರದ ಬಳೆ)
- Garathiya Guttu (ಗರತಿಯ ಗುಟ್ಟು)
- Hennu Kaanada Gandu (ಹೆಣ್ಣು ಕಾಣದ ಗಂಡು)
- Huchchu HuruLu (ಹುಚ್ಚು ಹುರುಳು)
- Kaamana (ಕಾಂಮಣ)
- Kallu Helithu (ಕಲ್ಲು ಹೇಳಿತು)
- Kamaleya Olegalu (ಕಮಲೆಯ ಓಲೆಗಳು)
- Kannada Emme (ಕನ್ನಡ ಎಮ್ಮೆ)
- Kaama Loka (ಕಾಮಲೋಕ)
- Kaanada Sundari (ಕಾಣದ ಸುಂದರಿ)
- Kattalalli Bandavalu (ಕತ್ತಲಲ್ಲಿ ಬಂದವಳು)
- Khaadi Seere (ಖಾದಿ ಸೀರೆ)
- Lakshmi Pooje (ಲಕ್ಷ್ಮೀ ಪೂಜೆ)
- Levady Typist (ಲೇವಡಿ ಟೈಪಿಸ್ಟ್)
- Maatanaduva Devarugalu (ಮಾತನಾಡುವ ದೇವರುಗಳು)
- Maatregalu (ಮಾತ್ರೆಗಳು)
- Madammana Ganda (ಮೇಡಮ್ಮನ ಗಂಡ)
- Maha Yuddha (ಮಹಾಯುದ್ಧ)
- Manethanada Gourava (ಮನೆತನದ ಗೌರವ)
- Mooru Hennu Aidhu Jade (ಮೂರು ಹೆಣ್ಣು ಐದು ಜಡೆ)
- Murida Bombe (ಮುರಿದ ಬೊಂಬೆ)
- Nanna Bhayagraphy (ನನ್ನ ಭಯಾಗ್ರಫಿ)
- Naraprani (ನರಪ್ರಾಣಿ)
- Number 55 (ನಂಬರ್ ೫೫)
- Sahukaara Subbamma (ಸಾಹುಕಾರ ಸುಬ್ಬಮ್ಮ)
- Sakkare MooTe (ಸಕ್ಕರೆ ಮೂಟೆ)
- Sampannariddaare Echcharike (ಸಂಪನ್ನರಿದ್ದಾರೆ ಎಚ್ಚರಿಕೆ)
- Saraswathi Samhara (ಸರಸ್ವತಿ ಸಂಹಾರ)
- Satee SooLe (ಸತೀಸೂಳೆ)
- Sattavanu Eddu Bandaga (ಸತ್ತವನು ಎದ್ದು ಬಂದಾಗ)
- Seethu Madhuve (ಸೀತೂ ಮದುವೆ)
- Subbi (ಸುಬ್ಬಿ)
- Sunandgooge Enanthe (ಸುನಂದೂಗೆ ಏನಂತೆ)
- Tent Cinema (ಟೆಂಟ್ ಸಿನೆಮಾ)
- Thochiddu Geechiddu (ತೋಚಿದ್ದು ಗೀಚಿದ್ದು)
- Timma Rasayana (ತಿಂಮ ರಸಾಯನ)
- Timma Sattaaga (ತಿಂಮ ಸತ್ತಾಗ)
- Timmana Tale (ತಿಂಮನ ತಲೆ)
- Timmayana (ತಿಂಮಾಯಣ)
- Timmikshanary (ತಿಮ್ಮಿಕ್ಷನರಿ)
- Utthara Bhoopa (ಉತ್ತರ ಭೂಪ)

=== Dramas ===
- Radio Natakagalu (ರೇಡಿಯೋ ನಾಟಕಗಳು)
- Hannondaneya Avatara (ಹನ್ನೊಂದನೆಯ ಅವತಾರ)
- Manusmruthi (ಮನುಸ್ಮೃತಿ)
- Ekikarana (ಏಕೀಕರಣ)
- Vasheekarana (ವಶೀಕರಣ)
- Ekodararu (ಏಕೋದರರು)
- Psychologist Sarangapani (ಸೈಕಾಲಜಿಸ್ಟ್ ಸಾರಂಗಪಾಣಿ)
- Devara Atmahatye (ದೇವರ ಆತ್ಮಹತ್ಯೆ)

=== Articles ===
- Kene Mosaru (ಕೆನೆ ಮೊಸರು) in Vishala Karnataka
- Bevinakatte (ಬೇವಿನ ಕಟ್ಟೆ) in Raitha
- Neevu Kelidiri (ನೀವು ಕೇಳಿದಿರಿ) in the Kannada magazine Sudha

== Quotes ==
- Prathiyobba Gandasigu mane mattu hendathi irale beku... swanthadaadashtu oLLedu... (ಪ್ರತಿಯೊಬ್ಬ ಗಂಡಸಿಗೂ ಮನೆ ಮತ್ತು ಹೆಂಡತಿ ಇರಲೇ ಬೇಕು ... ಸ್ವಂತದ್ದಾದಷ್ಟೂ ಒಳ್ಳೇದು!)
  - – Every Man needs a house and a wife – all the better if they are his own
- Namage bekadagalella Devaru pratyakshavaguvudilla. DhiDeerendu Devaru pratyakshavaguvudu kevala TamiLu cinema-gaLalli matra. (ನಮಗೆ ಬೇಕಾದಾಗಲೆಲ್ಲಾ ದೇವರು ಪ್ರತ್ಯಕ್ಷವಾಗುವುದಿಲ್ಲ. ಡಿಢೀರೆಂದು ದೇವರು ಪ್ರತ್ಯಕ್ಷವಾಗುವುದು ಕೇವಲ ತಮಿಳು ಸಿನೆಮಾಗಳಲ್ಲಿ ಮಾತ್ರ!)
  - – God does not appear before us whenever we want. He appears unexpectedly only in Tamil movies.
- Neevu odi engineer aagi, doctor aagi, lawyer aagi athva yava kelsanu siglilla andre, at least teacher aagi. Dayavittu rajakaraNi mathra agabedi. Yakendre: Politics is the last resort of the worst scoundrel! (ನೀವು ಓದಿ engineer ಆಗಿ, doctor ಆಗಿ, lawyer ಆಗಿ ಅಥವಾ ಯಾವ ಕೆಲ್ಸಾನು ಸಿಗ್ಲಿಲ್ಲ ಅಂದ್ರೆ, at least teacher ಆಗಿ. ದಯವಿಟ್ಟು ರಾಜಕಾರಣಿ ಮಾತ್ರ ಆಗಬೇಡಿ. ಯಾಕೇಂದ್ರೆ: Politics is the last resort of the worst scoundrel!)
  - – You study and become an engineer, doctor or a lawyer or else at least become a teacher; but never become a politician. Because: Politics is the last resort of the worst scoundrel!
- On the occasion of Gandhi Jayanti, when meat shops are closed in India:
  - Today is 2 October. No violence today. So the government has ordered to close chicken & mutton shops. What will the people who eat meat daily do? They will purchase the meat yesterday. To avoid today, more meat would have been sold yesterday. The animals that would have been killed today were already killed yesterday. So the poor animals were killed one day before.
- Bellary district has only two seasons – Summer and Severe Summer.
- Jeevanada durantavidu, endo bayasidudu indu siguttade, adu avanige bedavaagi pararige upayogavaaguvaaga, udaa: muppinalli kiriya hendati (ಜೀವನದ ದುರಂತವಿದು, ಎಂದೋ ಬಯಸಿದುದು ಇಂದು ಸಿಗುತ್ತದೆ, ಅದು ಅವನಿಗೆ ಬೇಡವಾಗಿ ಪರರಿಗೆ ಉಪಯೋಗವಾಗುವಾಗ, ಉದಾ: ಮುಪ್ಪಿನಲ್ಲಿ ಕಿರಿಯ ಹೆಂಡತಿ)
  - – It's the irony of life. The wishes of yesteryears are fulfilled only today; only when they are no longer useful to oneself but useful only to others. As an example: A young wife at an old age.
- ಸಾರಾಯಿ ನಿಶೇಧ ಕುಡಿಯದವರಿಗೆ ಮಾತ್ರ!! (Prohibition of alcohol is only for those who do not drink.)
- "ಸತ್ಯವನು ಅರಿತವನು ಸತ್ತಂತೆ ಇರಬೇಕು" ...
- "ಮನೆಯಾಕೆ ಸೃಷ್ಟಿಸುವ ವಾತಾವರಣವೇ ಮನೆಯ ವಾತಾವರಣ"
