= D. Mangala Priyadarshini =

D. Mangala Priyadarshini is a noted Indian feminist and critic who writes in Kannada. She is also a popular orator on Navodaya, Shrujana Shaitya, Veerashiva and Streevada (feminism) literature. As of 2012, she worked as Principal of Vidya Vardhaka Sangha Degree College for Women. She was a faculty member at Sheshadripuram College. She published approximately 20 books and many articles. She was also awarded the "Best Woman Critic" award. She appeared in televised discussions and radio talk shows.

Managala was born in Challakare to B. V. Dakshina Murthy, in the Mulukanadu Brahmin family, and noted Kannada writer Vishalakshi Dakshinamurthy. Raised in Bangalore, from a young age she was exposed to the literary world. At 22, she married scientist S. A. Pandit. She has a one daughter, Mridula Pandit.

== Selected works ==
- Thesis: Navodaya Kavyadalli Anubhavada Amshagalu
- Streevada Mattu Mahila Adhyayna
- Belagere Parvathamma
- Pracheena Kavya Dhare - 1
- Molige Mahadevamma - Sharana Parampare Pustaka Male - 12
- Aadhunika Kannada Kavyada Swaroopa* Bendre - Jnanapeeta Prashasti Vijetaru
