= A. N. Krishna Rao =

Indian Kannada novelist

A. N. Krishna Rao (A Na Kru)
- Born: 9 May 1908; Kolar, Kolar district, Kingdom of Mysore
- Died: 8 July 1971 (aged 63); Bangalore, Karnataka, India
- Occupations: Novelist, playwright, critic
- Writing career
- Pen name: A Na Kru
- Genre: Fiction

Arakalagudu Narasingarao Krishna Rao (9 May 1908 – 8 July 1971), popularly known as Anakru, was an Indian writer. He is one of the best-known writers in the Kannada-language and was popularly known as Kadambari Sarvabhouma (lit, "Universal monarch of Novels"). The inception of the Pragatishila ("progressive") movement in Kannada literature is credited to him. He received an honorary doctorate from the Mysore University and is also a recipient of the Karnataka Sahitya Academy Award.

== Life ==
Anakru was born on 9 May 1908 in the town of Kolar of the erstwhile Kingdom of Mysore (in present-day Karnataka, India). to Narasinga Rao (father) and Annapoornamma (mother). The family traces its roots to Arkalgud town in the Hassan district of Karnataka. At the start of his career, he edited literary Kannada magazines such Katha Manjari and Vishva Vani. He was also an editor of the Kannada Sahitya Parishath's publication Kannada Nudi ("Kannada speech"). Anakru was nominated as the president of 42nd Kannada Sahitya Sammelana held in Manipal. He is known for his passion for his native language Kannada. Once when introducing Anakru to an audience, Masti Venkatesh Iyengar, one of Kannada's most well-known writers said "I am a Tamil Kannadiga, Sir Mirza Ismail is a Muslim Kannadiga, and Anakru is a pure Kannadiga". This tribute from the likes of Masti mirrors the Kannada fervour Anakru was known for.

Anakru fought for the unification of Kannada speaking regions, when Kannada speakers were spread across different provinces in British India. He started a movement to promote and popularize Kannada. He openly criticized people in authority who neglected Kannada. In one such case, he wrote an article in the Kannada Nudi, criticizing the Hindi oriented policies of R. R. Divakar (the first governor of Bihar), the President of Kannada Sahitya Sammelana in 1929. On being asked to apologize, Anakru resigned from the post of the editor. Anakru lived most of his life in his house (called Annapoorna) in Vishveshwarapuram, a suburb in South Bangalore. He died on 8 July 1971 at the age of 63.

== Literature ==
Starting with his first novel, Jeevanayathre ("Journey of life"), Anakru wrote for about 40 years and authored more than a hundred novels. He was a prolific writer and his literary output exceeded eighty thousand pages. When he started writing, the Navodaya form of Kannada literature was in vogue. He rejected this form because he felt such writings were a creation of aesthetes and did not reflect the disturbing realities of life. He came up with themes that formed a new movement in itself, called Pragatishila ("progressive"). Anakru saw literature as an instrument of social change. Influenced by Anakru, other promising writers such as Ta Ra Su (T.R. Subba Rao), Basavaraj Kattimani and Anupama Niranjana wrote novels that belonged to the Pragatishila genre.

Not known to follow the beaten track, Anakru penned three novels, Nagna Sathya, Shani Santaana and Sanje Gaththalu, with themes dwelling on the topic of prostitution for which he was criticized for depicting vulgarity in these novels. To defend his theme, Anakru wrote in his work Sahitya mattu kama prachodane ("Literature and the propagation of lust"): "If telling the truth is vulgar, then I am a vulgar writer. If the act of covering with a cloth, a downtrodden helpless naked woman on the street is vulgar, then I am a vulgar writer". His non-moralistic approach to writing and extensive usage of dialogue contributed to vast readership.

His magnum opus novel Natasarvabhowma runs for 750 pages, delves into the dire state of Kannada drama world, during the early 20th century. He provides the details about what was ailing the Kannada drama companies and provides valuable suggestions on their improvement. The novel covers the life of fictitious stage actor Rajacharaya, his struggle to establish as an actor and then to run the drama company as its proprietor. This novel was first published in 1940 and was way ahead of its time. The novel was criticized for celebrating the extramarital affairs of Rajacharya. However out of 750 pages hardly 3–4 pages covers this and the rest wonderfully depicts the do good nature of Rajachraya, where he donates majority of his earnings to charity. Krishna Raos love for the Kannada culture, its people and his quest to see the Kannada speaking areas integrated comes out clearly. He severely criticizes the language bigotry and tries to convey that all languages are great through Rajacharya.

Anakru wrote many novels where the protagonist was an artist. These novels follow a plot which narrates the story of a gifted musician who becomes famous, only to succumb to the charms of a woman. This leads to his subsequent failure as his commitment on the art deteriorates. At the end, the artist either overcomes this to regain his touch or succumbs completely to passion leading to his eventual failure. One of Anakru's most popular novels Sandhyaraaga belonged to this theme and narrates of the life of a dedicated musician while contrasting him with his mean brother. a Kannada movie based on this novel in 1966 received critical acclaim. This same novel motivated Beechi, one of the great Kannada humorist, to contribute to Kannada literature. Other notable novels written by Anakru with on theme are the Mia Malhar, Udayaraga, Sahitya Ratna and Vijayanagara Samrajya (11 novels).

== Awards and honours ==
- President of the 43rd Kannada Sahitya Sammelana held in Manipal
- Sahitya Akademi Karnataka State award.
- Honorary Doctorate in Literature from Mysore University

== Writings ==
Novel

- Kalankini
- Amara August
- Kamini Kanchana
- Bannada Baduku
- Hosilu Datida Hennu
- Deva Priya
- Rukmini
- Shani Santhana
- Sandhyaraaga
- Kannadammanna Gudiyalli
- Amrutha Manthana
- Pankaja
- Marjala Sanyasi
- Kasthuri
- Aashirwada
- Anugraha
- Bhoomigilidu Banda Bhagavanta
- Enakshi
- Chitrakale
- Adrushta Nakshatra
- Janatha Janardhana
- Vishwa Bandhu Basavanna
- Eedari Aadhari
- Sangrama
- Tayiya Karulu
- Shubha Samaya
- Yaariguntu Yaarigilla
- Kabbinada Kaage
- Natasarvabhowma
- Nidumaamidi Sannidhiyavaru
- Kannina Gombe
- Maralu Mane
- Samadarshana
- Udayaraga
- Nara Narayana
- Punaravatara
- Hengarulu
- Deeparadhane
- Sangrama Dhureena
- Parivarthane
- Bhuvana Mohini
- Huliyuguru (Vol 1–3)
- Gajina Mane
- Narabali
- Maneyalli Mahayuddha
- Rana Vikrama
- Sarthaka Sahitya
- Sahitya Samaradhana
- Kattida Banna
- Kagadada Hoo
- Muyyige Muyyee
- Daadiya Maga
- Akkayya
- Abhayapradhana Mattu Tejobhanga
- Nagna Sathya
- Hennu Janma
- Jeevanadhi
- Abhimana
- Sanje Gathalu
- Sakidha Aliya
- Kulaputra
- Taayi Makkalu
- Annadatha
- Chitra Vichitra
- Ratna Deepa
- Kalavidha
- Bhumi Tayi
- Chiranjeeve
- Stree Mukha Vyaghra
- Hosa Suggi
- Aparanji
- Roopashree
- Kanneeru
- Bhagyadha Baagilu
- Arulu Marulu
- Honne Modhalu
- Keerthi Kalasha
- Hosa Huttu
- Gruhalakshmi
- Hegadharu Badhukona
- Mudimallige
- Barahagarana Baduku
- Kunkuma Prasada
- Dharmapathni
- Garuda Machee
- Vijaya Vidyaranya Mattu Thapobala [Vijayanagara seris – Harihara, bukka, Harihara II]
- Punya Prabhava Mattu Prouda Prathapi [Vijayanagara Seris – Devaraya – I, Devaraya – II]
- Mohana Murari Mattu Yashodundhubhi [Vijayanagara Seris – Saluva Narasimha, Sri Krishnadevaraya ]
- Abhaya Pradhana Mattu Tejobhanga [Vijayanagara Seris – Sri Krishnadevaraya, Sri Achyutadevaraya ]
- Aaliya Ramaraya Mattu Pralayananthara [Vijayanagara Seris – Viajyanagara downfall, Araveedu Dynasty]
- Veerashiva Sahithya Mattu Samskruthi
- Aparajethe
- Bhamamani
- Miya Malhar
- Panjarada Gini
- Jathaka Pakshi
- Papiya Nele
- Gowri
- Sumuhurtha
- Jeevana Yatre
- Srimathi
- Natasarvabhowma
- Kanchana Ganga
- Anna Thangi
- Kaalachakara

Play

- A Na Krishnarayara Pouranika Natakagalu
- A Na Krishnarayara Samajika Natakagalu
- A Na Krishnarayara Ithihasika Natakagalu

Criticism

- Kannada Kularasikaru
- Sahitya Ratna
- Bharateeya Kala Darshana
- Sajeeva Sahitya
- Nataka Kale
- Sahitya Mattu Kamaprachodane
- Karnatakada Hitha Chinthane
- Sahitya Mattu Jeevana
- Bharateeya Samskruthi Darshana
- Samskrutiya Vishvarupa
- A Na Kru Avara Samagra Veerashaiva Sahitya
- Bharateeya Chitrakaleyalli Raja Ravivarmana Sthana
- Kannada Sahitya Mattu Samskruti
- Sahitya Mattu Yugadharma

Biography

- Bharathada Bapu
- Karnatakadha Kalavidharu'
- Kailasam
- Deenabandhu Kabeera
- Sri Basavannanavara Amritavani
- Allamaprabhu
- Kannada Kula Rasikaru

Autobiography

- Amara Chetana
- Barahagarana Baduku Mathu Nannannu Naane Kande

Children's books

- Shree Krishnadevaraya : Kannada Nadu Mattu Kannadegara Parpampare
- Kempegowda – Kannada Nadu Mattu Kannadigara Parampare
- Sarvagna Kavi – Kannada Nadu Mattu Kannadigara Parampare
- Yalahanka Bhupaala
- Sundharu Samsara

Religion & Other

- Bhagavadgeetaarthasaara

Short Story

- Neelalochane Mattu Ithara Kathegalu
- A Na Kru Avara Samagra Katha Sankalana
