= 21st Filmfare Awards South =

Award ceremony for South Indian films

- Date: 11 April 1974
- Site: Shanmukhananda Hall Bombay
- Hosted by: Devid

The 21st Filmfare Awards South ceremony honoring the winners of the best of South Indian cinema in 1973 was held in Shanmukhananda Hall Bombay on 11 April 1974 along with Hindi Awards.

The chief guests were Tamil Nadu Chief Minister M. Karunanidhi and Hollywood actress Diane Baker.

== Jury ==
Tamil, Telugu, Malayalam & Kannada
- Justice G. Ramanujam - (Chairman)
- S. V. Chitti Babu
- K. Vishwanathan
- C. N. Ramanujam
- C. V. George
- P. Pulliah
- B. K. Anantharaman
- Vasudev Nayak
- Mrs. S. Kurien
- S. V. Venugopalan - (Ex Officio)

== Awards ==
=== Main awards ===
==== Kannada cinema ====
Best Film	Best Director
Naagarahaavu	Puttanna Kanagal - Edakallu Guddada Mele
Best Actor	Best Actress
Rajkumar- Gandhada Gudi	Jayanthi - Edakallu Guddada Mele

==== Malayalam cinema ====
Best Film	Best Director
Panitheeratha Veedu	K. S. Sethumadhavan - Pani Theeratha Veedu
Best Actor	Best Actress
P. J. Antony - Nirmalayam	Nanditha Bose - Swapnam

==== Tamil cinema ====
Best Film	Best Director
Bharatha Vilas	A. C. Tirulokchandar -Bharatha Vilas
Best Actor	Best Actress
Sivaji Ganesan - Gauravam	Jayalalithaa -Suryakanthi

==== Telugu cinema ====
Best Film	Best Director
Jeevana Tharangaalu	T. Rama Rao - Jeevana Tharangaalu
Best Actor	Best Actress
Akkineni Nageswara Rao- Marupurani Manishi	Vanisri- Jeevana Tarangalu

=== Special awards ===
Special Award for excellent performance
- Vishnuvardhan - Nagarahavu

Special Award for excellent production values
- Ulagam Sutrum Valiban - M. G. Ramachandran

== Awards presentation ==
- K. S. R. Murthy (Best Film Malayalam) Received Award from Mehtab Modi
- K S Sethumadhavan (Best Director Malayalam) Received Award from Radha Saluja
- Nanditha Bose (Best Actress Malayalam) Received Award from Feroz Khan
- N. Veeraswamy (Best Film Kannada) Received Award from Reena Roy
- S. R. Puttanna Kanagal (Best Director Kannada) Received Award from Neetu Singh
- Jayanthi (Best Actress Kannada) Received Award from Vijay Arora
- Rajkumar (Best Actor Kannada)Received Award from Helen
- Vishnuvardhan (Special Acting Award Kannada) Received Award from Farida Jalal
- D. Rama Naidu (Best Film Telugu) Received Award from Vinod Mehra
- D. Rama Naidu Receives T Rama Rao's Award (Best Director Telugu) from Ambika Johar
- S. V. Venugopal Receives A Nageswara Rao's Award (Best Actor Telugu) from Tariq
- T. Bharathi (Best Film Tamil) Received Award from Sujeet Kumar
- A. C. Tirulokchandar (Best Director Tamil) Received Award from Prem Chopra
- Sivaji Ganesan (Best Actor Tamil) Received Award from Lata Mangeshkar
