= Naagarahaavu =

- Theatrical release poster
- Directed by: Puttanna Kanagal
- Screenplay by: Puttanna Kanagal
- Story by: T. R. Subba Rao
- Based on: Nagarahavu, Ondu Gandu Eradu Hennu and Sarpa Mathsara by T. R. Subba Rao
- Produced by: N. Veeraswamy
- Starring: Vishnuvardhan; Ambareesh; Aarathi; Shubha; K S Ashwath
- Cinematography: Chittibabu
- Edited by: P. Bhakthavathsalam
- Music by: Vijaya Bhaskar
- Production company: Sri Eswari Productions
- Release date: 29 December 1972
- Running time: 190 minutes
- Country: India
- Language: Kannada

Naagarahaavu ( transl. Cobra) is a 1972 Indian Kannada-language film directed by Puttanna Kanagal, based on T. R. Subba Rao's three novels Nagarahavu, Ondu Gandu Eradu Hennu and Sarpa Mathsara, and starring Vishnuvardhan, Aarathi, K. S. Ashwath and Shubha. The supporting cast features Leelavathi, M. Jayashree, M. N. Lakshmi Devi, Ambareesh, Shivaram, Dheerendra Gopal, Lokanath and Vajramuni. The film has a musical score by Vijaya Bhaskar. Cinematography was done by Chittibabu.

The film revolves around the protagonist's relationship with his teacher, Chamayya (K. S. Ashwath). Chamayya, who is childless treats Ramachari (Vishnuvardhan) as his son. He takes it upon himself to guide Ramachari on the right path despite Ramachari's legendary anger. He usually acts as the negotiator between his student and the people who have issues with Ramachari's behaviour. Ramachari is a young man whose anger is his weakness. He is difficult to reason with and has a great deal of pride. Chamayya is the only person who can convince him to do anything. His love interests are Alamelu (Aarathi) and Margaret (Shubha) who play pivotal parts in his life.

The film was released on 29 December 1972 to widespread critical acclaim and was a success at the box office and paved the way for the stardom of Vishnuvardhan, Ambareesh and Aarathi who became leading actors in Kannada cinema. It has developed a cult following over the years. The character roles of Leelavathi, Dheerendra Gopal, Loknath, M. N. Lakshmi Devi were also critically acclaimed. The film won eight Karnataka State Film Awards for Second Best Film, Best Actor, Best Actress, Best Supporting Actor, Best Supporting Actress, Best Story, Best Screenplay and Best Dialogue. The film also won two Filmfare Awards South for Best Film – Kannada and a Special Award for excellent performance. This film was remade in Hindi as Zehreela Insaan, directed by Puttanna Kanagal himself and in Telugu as Kode Nagu and Raja Nagam in Tamil.

The film was re-released in its digitized version on 20 July 2018. This movie was digitalized by Balaji who is the brother of V. Ravichandran and son of N. Veeraswamy, who was the producer.

== Plot ==
The story revolves around a short-tempered, yet affable college student named Ramachari in the town of Chitradurga. The story begins with Ramachari being caught in class while trying to copy in an examination and being suspended by the college principal (Loknath). Humiliated and angry, Ramachari throws stones at the principal's house in the night and when the principal wakes up and comes out of his house, ties the half-naked principal to a pole and runs away.

Ramachari is the son of pious parents. His father doesn't like Ramachari because he is unpopular in the town as a ruffian. His mother is worried about his future. One person who cares for Ramachari is his primary school teacher, Chamayya (K.S.Ashwath) master. Ramachari finds the company of Chamayya and his wife Tunga (Leelavathi), more comforting than that of his parents. Ramachari has very great regard for Chamayya master willing to do whatever he says, without thinking.

The next part of the story is about the two women Almelu (Aarathi) and Margaret (Shubha) who come into Ramachari's life and how the teacher Chamayya influences Ramachari's decisions in these relationships. The teacher tries to bring Ramachari into the "conventional way of life", but he errs and Ramachari's life is destroyed.

In college, Ramachari hangs out with Varada (Shivaram) and other friends. Varada has a very beautiful sister named Almelu. Almelu's beauty has maddened a neighbourhood hooligan, Jaleela (Ambareesh) who stalks her. Varada wants to put an end to this eve-teasing but he is timid. He asks Ramachari for help. Ramachari agrees when Varada tells him he'll get his sister Almelu married to Ramachari. Ramachari fights with Jaleela and drives him away. Almelu and Ramachari fall in love. Almelu's parents arrange for her marriage within their caste. When Almelu refuses the proposal and declares her love for Ramachari, Varada refuses support, denying any promise made to Ramachari. Teacher Chamayya intervenes and requests Ramachari to give up Almelu. He convinces Ramachari by making him understand that sacrifice is a greater act than selfish love. Ramachari, out of respect, agrees to his teacher and sacrifices his love. A few years later, Ramachari runs into Almelu at a five-star hotel, where she is a call-girl. Almelu's husband has forced her into a life of prostitution for money.

The second girl in Ramachari's life is Margaret, a peppy Christian girl. After Ramachari kisses Margaret during a tussle between the two, she falls in love with him. After he is forced to give up Almelu, Ramachari starts responding to Margaret's advances. However, due to the intense pressure of the society which denounces the marriage between a Brahmin boy and a Christian girl, they decide to elope. Once again teacher Chamayya tries to stop Ramachari saying that sacrifice is greater than love. But this time, Ramachari confronts his teacher and says that he won't budge because the last time he sacrificed his love, it went horribly wrong. Chamayya realises, perhaps for the first time, that Ramachari is right and he himself was wrong.

Chamayya falls to his death from the hill when Ramachari accidentally pushes him in a fit of rage for saying, "if you want to marry her, you have to witness my death before it." Ramachari, shocked by this incident, asks Margaret to join him in a bid to accompany his beloved teacher in death, to which she agrees and they both jump off the cliff. Ramachari, the hero is compared to a King Cobra. Dangerous, yet respected but a misfit in the society.

== Cast ==
- Vishnuvardhan as Ramachari
- Aarathi as Alamelu
- Shubha as Margaret
- Jayanthi as Onake Obavva (Special appearance)
- Ambareesh as Jaleela
- K. S. Ashwath as Chamayya Meshtru
- Leelavathi as Thungamma, wife of Chammayya Meshtru
- Laxminarayan Shet as Alamelu's husband
- H. R. Shastry as Shyam Iyengar, Alamelu's father
- Pratima Devi as Alamelu's mother
- M. P. Shankar as Pailwan Basanna
- Shivaram as Varadha, Alamelu's brother
- Lokanath as C. H. Shyam Rao, college principal
- Dheerendra Gopal as Thukaram, classmate of Ramachari
- Vajramuni as "Laxmu", a lawyer
- Shakti Prasad as Naidu uncle
- M. Jayashree as Ramachari's mother
- M. N. Lakshmi Devi as Mary, Margaret's mother

== Soundtrack ==
The music of the film was composed by Vijaya Bhaskar with lyrics penned by Vijaya Narasimha, Chi. Udaya Shankar and R. N. Jayagopal.

Two songs from this movie went on to be used in the Telugu version Kode Nagu – Sangama Sangama was re-used as Sangamam Sangamam and Kathe Heluve was re-used as Katha Vinduva. The song Haavina Dwesha went on to be used in the Hindi version as Saanp Se Badhke. Vijayabhaskar reused "Karpoorada Gombe" as "Varavendum Vaazhkaiyil Vasantham" for Tamil film Mayangukiral Oru Maadhu.

The song "Kannada Naadina" narrates the story of Onake Obavva who fought the forces of Hyder Ali. "Baare Baare" was the first song in an Indian film to be fully shot in slow motion.

=== Track List ===
No.	Title	Lyrics	Singer(s)	Length
1.	"Haavina Dwesha"	Vijaya Narasimha	S. P. Balasubrahmanyam
2.	"Kannada Naadina"	Chi. Udaya Shankar	P. B. Srinivas
3.	"Karpoorada Bombe"	R. N. Jayagopal	P. Susheela
4.	"Baare Baare"	Vijaya Narasimha	P. B. Srinivas
5.	"Sangama Sangama"	Vijaya Narasimha	P. B. Srinivas, P. Susheela
6.	"Kathe Heluve"	Chi. Udaya Shankar	P. Susheela

== Awards ==
=== 21st Filmfare Awards South ===
- Best Film – Kannada
- Special Award for excellent performance – Vishnuvardhan

=== 1972–73 Karnataka State Film Awards ===
- Second Best Film
- Best Actor – Vishnuvardhan
- Best Actress – Aarathi
- Best Supporting Actor – K. S. Ashwath
- Best Supporting Actress – Shubha
- Best Story – T. R. Subba Rao
- Best Screenplay – Puttanna Kanagal
- Best Dialogue – Chi. Udayashankar

== Criticism ==
After watching the film, T. R. Subba Rao remarked that Puttanna Kanagal has turned Naagarahaavu (the cobra) into 'Kerehaavu' (meaning rat snake). The implied meaning is that the characterisation of Ramachari in the novel and the movie is strikingly different and less effective. Nevertheless, Naagarahaavu is an all-time favorite movie and remains popular in all its reruns.

== Remakes & Legacy ==
- This film was remade in Hindi titled as Zehreela Insaan, directed by Puttanna Kanagal himself.
- The film was remade in Tamil as Raja Nagam with Srikanth playing the lead role.
- This film was remade into Telugu titled Kode Nagu starring Sobhan Babu, Chandrakala and Lakshmi and noted lyricist Acharya Athreya. This was directed by K. S. Prakash Rao.
- The 2014 film Mr. and Mrs. Ramachari pays homage by loosely basing its plot on this film.
