= Jeevana Chaitra =

- Film poster
- Directed by: Dorai–Bhagavan
- Written by: Vishalakshi Dakshinamurthy
- Screenplay by: Chi. Udaya Shankar
- Based on: Vyapthi Prapthi by Vishalakshi Dakshinamurthy
- Produced by: Parvathamma Rajkumar
- Starring: Rajkumar; Madhavi; K. S. Ashwath; Pandari Bai; Gurudutt; Abhijeeth
- Cinematography: S. V. Srikanth
- Edited by: P. Bhaktavatsalam
- Music by: Upendra Kumar
- Production company: Sri Dakshayini Cine Combines
- Release date: 1992
- Running time: 157 minutes
- Country: India
- Language: Kannada
- Budget: ₹ 25 lakhs
- Box office: ₹ 8 crores

Jeevana Chaitra (transl. Life Spring) is a 1992 Indian Kannada language film directed by the duo Dorai–Bhagavan starring Rajkumar and Madhavi. It marked the re-entry of Rajkumar in films after a hiatus of three years, and was an instant hit. The film is based on the Kannada novel Vyapthi Prapthi written by Vishalakshi Dakshinamurthy. The film was initially titled Simhadriya Simha, a title which was later used for the 2002 film starring Vishnuvardhan. The film re-affirmed the hold Rajkumar had on Kannada audiences. It was highly successful at the box office and had a theatrical run of 52 weeks.

For the song "Naadamaya", Rajkumar won the National Film Award for Best Male Playback Singer at the 40th National Film Awards. The film won four awards at the 1992–93 Karnataka State Film Awards — First Best Film, Best Actor (Rajkumar), Best Music Director (Upendra Kumar) and Best Dialogue Writer (Chi. Udaya Shankar).

== Plot ==
Rama Rao is a jodidar of Simhadri and its surrounding villages living with his wife Seetha and son Vishwanath. Once, the trio visits a function in the village, where they see Meenakshi. Vishwanath expresses his interest in Meenakshi as his life partner and presents the case before his parents. Vishwanath's father accepts the marriage proposal. Meenakshi and Vishwanath get married. Vishwanath takes over the mantle of jodidar of Simhaadri and eight villages from his father.

He fights illiteracy, the illicit liquor racket, and other social evils, in order to help villagers. He and Meenakshi have three children. There is a parallel comedy storyline of the movie, centering on Putta Joisa, who joins as the priest of the family-entrusted main temple.

Their eldest son, a doctor, falls for his classmate, the daughter of a liquor baron, Toogudeepa, who creates a rift between father and son and insults Vishwanath when he approaches to discuss the marriage proposal. Toogudeepa threatens Gurudutt that he can choose either his father's village or his love. Gurudutt fights with his father and leaves home. This comes as the first blow to Vishwanatha Raya.

Abhijit, the second son, gets married, but his wife is not very happy staying in the village and serving her in-laws. Vishwanath and Meenakshi plan to have Meenakshi's niece marry their youngest son Narahari. Narahari, who has a secret love affair, marries her and brings her home, once he learns of his parents' plan. Meenakshi and Vishwanath are shocked. The burden is too much for Meenakshi and she dies, while welcoming her new daughter-in-law.

Vishwanath feels lonely and goes on a theertha yaatre, has an accident, and loses his memory. He wanders around and is shown visiting Badri, Rishikesh, Kedarnath and Varanasi. When he finds the beauty of Himalaya, he is spellbound by nature and sings his heart out. Putta Joisa finds his old employer, clothed in rags and singing on a ghaat. He helps Vishwanath regain memory.

Meanwhile, Toogudeepa convinces Vishwanath's three sons to hand over their ancestral property and takes it over. Vishwanath returns, only to find his home turned from a temple to a tavern. He single-handedly beats drunkards gathered there and questions his sons about his mother. Learning that she is lonely in the passing days in the hut, he visits his mother. Pandari Bai is filled with joy to find her son alive. Vishwanath once again starts the task of fighting liquor racket, gambling, and other evils. He ends up on a winning note, as the gambler's den is made into a primary school and the liquor factory is closed. His children too learn their lesson and join hands with him. A happy man, Vishwanath creates a will dividing his assets among his sons and leaves to a higher calling. The last scene shows Vishwanath ascending a hill, far from Simhaadri.

== Cast ==
- Dr. Rajkumar as Vishwanathaiah
- Madhavi as Meenakshi, Vishwanath's wife
- Sudharani as Lakshmi (Special appearance)
- K. S. Ashwath as Rama Rao, Vishwanath's father
- Pandari Bai as Seetha, Vishwanath's mother
- Chi Guru Dutt as Prathap, Vishwanath's elder son
- Abhijeeth as Prakash, Vishwanath's second son
- Balaraj as Narahari, Vishwanath's third son
- Thoogudeepa Srinivas as Narasinha Rao
- Honnavalli Krishna
- Tennis Krishna as Putta Jois
- Sathyabhama
- Gayathri Prabhakar
- Sriraksha as Narasinha Rao's daughter and Prathap's wife
- Sundarashree as Narasinha Rao's wife
- Shivaram as Doctor
- S. K. Bhagavan as Police Inspector

== Soundtrack ==
Jeevana Chaitra

Soundtrack album by Upendra Kumar
- Released: 1992
- Genre: Feature film soundtrack
- Length: 27:48
- Label: Sangeetha
- Director: Upendra Kumar

The score of the film and the soundtrack were composed by Upendra Kumar, with lyrics penned by Chi. Udaya Shankar and Mugur Mallappa. The soundtrack album consists of five tracks. As of 2023, the song Naadamaya was reported to have ranked high on Spotify’s Kannada songs list. Though credited to Upendra Kumar, the song Naadamaya was composed by M. Ranga Rao. That song was set in Todi raga.

Track listing
No.	Title	Lyrics	Singer(s)	Length
1.	"Aralida Thanuvidu"	Chi. Udaya Shankar	Dr. Rajkumar	5:07
2.	"Naadamaya"	Chi. Udayashankar	Dr. Rajkumar	7:34
3.	"Manavanagi"	Mugur Mallappa	Dr. Rajkumar	4:34
4.	"Ninna Chelava Vadana"	Chi. Udayashankar	Dr. Rajkumar, Manjula Gururaj	4:45
5.	"Lakshmi Baaramma"	Chi. Udayashankar	Dr. Rajkumar, Manjula Gururaj	5:48
Total length:				27:48

== Release and reception ==
Simhadriya Simha title announcement poster of the film released before the title was eventually altered to Jeevana Chaitra

Jeevana Chaitra was very popular when it was released, and the movie tickets became a prized commodity. There was no release by Rajkumar in the previous years.

The movie completed 100 days and had to be removed from theatres. Rajkumar's cut-out of the suit-clad hero had the usual ritual of getting soaked in milk at many places.

=== Box office ===
The film ran for 375 days and, owing to the audience reception, Rajkumar had to announce that he would act in another movie, Aakasmika.

=== Reviews and critiques ===
The movie received rave reviews, owing to the storyline and message about combating liquor barons.
