= Basant Bahar (film) =

1956 film

- Directed by: Raja Nawathe
- Written by: Rajinder Singh Bedi
- Story by: Ta-Ra-Su
- Based on: Hamsageethe by TaRaSu.
- Produced by: R. Chandra
- Starring: Bharat Bhushan; Nimmi
- Cinematography: M. Rajaram
- Edited by: P. S. Khochikar; G. G. Mayekar
- Music by: Shankar Jaikishan
- Production company: Shri Vishwa Bharati Films
- Release date: 7 December 1956
- Country: India
- Language: Hindi

Basant Bahar (transl. Beautiful Spring), directed by Raja Nawathe, is a 1956 Indian film.

This musical had nine outstanding songs, with lyrics written by Shailendra and Hasrat Jaipuri; and music composition by Shankar–Jaikishan. The movie is an adaptation of the Kannada novel Hamsageethe by TaRaSu. Hamsa means swan and Geethe means song. It is believed that before a swan dies, it will sing without opening its mouth. That mutter of melody is believed to be unmatched since any scene of lyricism falls short of its reach.

== Plot ==
Gopal Joshi (Bharat Bhushan) likes to sing. His father, Narsin Joshi (Om Prakash), the royal astrologer, scolds him for singing and wants him to become an astrologer.

His neighbor Malaya, the son of the royal musician, is scolded by his father for being lesser than Gopal in singing. They both are competing in a music competition, the winner of which will become the royal musician.

On the day of the competition, however, Malaya gives Gopal some holy water, which contains poison, ruining Gopal's singing ability. First he loses the competition, and then his voice completely.

A dancer named Gopi (Nimmi) helps him regain his voice. However, their friendship and love is perennially star crossed with barriers thrown in their way at every turn. Due to a misunderstanding, Gopal does not meet Gopi when he committed to. When Gopal runs away, he meets Lehri Baba, who teaches him singing, giving him his confidence back. However, Lehri Baba passes away after it is revealed that he is Gopi's father and Gopi was stolen from him 12 years back. On Gopal's return, the couple faces continuous societal obstacles, misunderstandings, and ongoing conflict with Malaya.

In the tragic climax, Gopal sings a final masterpiece for a deity, ignoring the mandate to sing for the empress first, and then sacrifices his own tongue to avoid singing again. Outside the temple, he finds Gopi's dead body and they both die on the temple steps.

== Cast ==
- Bharat Bhushan as Gopal
- Nimmi as Gopi
- Kumkum as Radhika (as Kum Kum)
- Leela Chitnis as Gopal's mother
- Om Prakash as Narsin
- Manmohan Krishna as Lehri Baba
- Parsuram (as Parashram)
- Chand Burke as Leelabai (as Chand Burque)
- Shyam Kumar
- S. K. Prem
- Babu Raje
- S. B. Nayampalli (as Nayam Pally)
- Indira Billi
- Chandrashekhar as Emperor (as Chandra Shekhar)

== Awards ==
- National Film Awards
  - 1956 - Certificate of Merit for Best Feature Film in Hindi

== Music and soundtrack ==
This movie's film songs became very popular among the public.

"With each song being a diamond chiseled in the workshop of harmony, 'Basant Bahar' also proves that SJ (Shankar-Jaikishan) could whet all kinds of tastes, trends and demands with equal ease. Aided by their evergreen poetic friends Shailendra and Hasrat Jaipuri, these memorable songs are of rare quality and timbre to soothe and enchant music lovers of all ages".

#	Song	Singer	Raga
1	"Badi Der Bhayee"	Mohammed Rafi	Pilu (raga)
2	"Bhay Bhajana Vandana Sun Hamaree"	Manna Dey	Miyan ki Malhar
3	"Duniya Na Bhaye Mohe"	Mohammed Rafi	Todi (raga)
4	"Ja Ja Re Ja Balama"	Lata Mangeshkar	Jhinjhoti
5	"Kar Gaya Re Mujh Pe Jadoo"	Lata Mangeshkar, Asha Bhosle	
6	"Ketaki Gulaab Juhi"	Manna Dey, Bhimsen Joshi	Basant Bahar (raga)
7	"Main Piya Teri, Tu Maane Ya Na Maane"	Lata Mangeshkar	Bhairavi (Hindustani)
8	"Nain Mile Chain Kahan"	Lata Mangeshkar, Manna Dey	Bhairavi (Hindustani)
9	"Sur Na Saje, Kya Gaaun Mein"	Manna Dey	Pilu (raga)
