= Basavaraj Kattimani =

Indian progressive writer, novelist, journalist (1919-1989)

- Born: Basavaraj Kattimani; 5 October 1919; Malamaradi, Gokak taluk, Belgaum district, India
- Died: 23 October 1989 (aged 70); Dharwad
- Resting place: Malamaradi, Gokak
- Education: Matriculation
- Occupations: Journalist and novelist
- Children: 6
- Writing career
- Language: Kannada
- Period: 1940–1989
- Genres: Story and novel
- Subject: Various themes
- Notable work: Nee Nanna Muttabeda

Basavaraj Kattimani (1919–1989) was a progressive writer, novelist, journalist and was also a member of Karnataka Legislative Council from Karnataka.

He was also known as Kundara Naadina Kanda.

== Literary works ==
- Maji Manthri
- Maadi Madidavaru
- Janivara Mattu Shivadara
- Jalataranga
- Baleya Bisidaru
- Pourusha Parikshe
- Nanu Polisanagidde
- Mannu Mattu Hennu
- Giriya Navilu
- Saitan
- Belagina Gali
- Swatantradedege
- Nanu Kanda Russia
- Kumara Rama - Kannada Bharatha Bharathi - 212
- Sangolli Rayanna - Kannada Bharatha Bharathi - 36
- Basavaraja Kattimani Samagra Sahithya Samputa 1 Rinda 15
- Maadi Madidavaru (Autobiography)
- Sakshatkara
- Pataragitti
- Bangarada Jinkeya Hinde
- Jwalamukhiya Mele
- Kadambarikaran Kate
- Chakravyuha
- Gramasevika
- Sangolli Rayanayaka
- Mohada Baleyalli
- Bengalurigondu Ticketu
- Beediyalli Biddavalu
- Nee Nanna Muttabeda
- Kundara Nadina Kanda

== Positions held ==
- He was a member of Karnataka Legislative Council (Congress nominated) from 1968 to 1974.

== Awards and honors ==
- He received Soviet Land Nehru Award for his novel Jwalamukhiya Mele
- He was the president of the 52nd Kannada Sahitya Sammelana held in 1980.
- He was the recipient of Karnataka Sahitya Academy Award

== Recognition ==
- A foundation named Basavaraj Kattimani Foundation has been set up in his name at Belgaum to promote his literary and culture works by the Government of Karnataka. The late research scholar M. M. Kalburgi was made first President of the trust.
- Kottala Mahadevapa has written a book named Basavaraj Kattimani on the life story of Basavaraj Kattimani and the book is published by Kannada Pusthaka Pradhikara.
