= T. R. Subba Rao =

Indian novelist (1920-1984)

- Born: 21 April 1920; Taluku, Mysore State, British India
- Died: 10 April 1984 (aged 63); Bangalore, Karnataka, India
- Occupations: Writer, professor
- Relatives: TS Venkannaiah (uncle); Vishalakshi Dakshinamurthy (niece) Nagaprasad TN (Son); TN ShruthiPriya (Granddaughter)
- Writing career
- Pen name: Ta Ra Su
- Genre: Fiction
- Literary movement: Navya, Pragatishila

Talukina Ramaswamayya Subba Rao (1920–1984), popularly known as TaRaSu, was an Indian novelist and a scholar in the Kannada-language. He is considered as a harbinger of the Navya movement of Kannada literature. He is well known for his novels like Durgashtamana, which won him the Sahitya Akademi award posthumously in 1985.

== Early life ==
TaRaSu was born on 21 April 1920 in Taluku Challakere Taluk Chitradurga District in the Mysore state of British India (present day Karnataka state of India). His father Ramaswamaiah was a lawyer in the town of Harihar and his mother was Seethamma. His ancestors were from the village of Taluku in the Chitradurga district of Karnataka. He wrote his first story called Puttana Chendu (Putta's ball) to win a bet against his uncle TS Venkannaiah who made self-less contribution to Kannada language through promoting many prominent authors. When he was 17 years old, he joined the Indian freedom movement and went around the villages in the Chitradurga district, singing patriotic songs and giving speeches for independence. He was arrested and jailed when he was giving one of the speeches in Bagur village.

Fearing that his son would lose out on education by joining the freedom movement, Ramaswamaiah admitted his son to the National School in Bangalore. After completing his secondary education, TaRaSu joined a college in Shimoga. After completing his junior intermediate education, he joined a college in Tumkur to complete senior intermediate education. However, the students started boycotting the classes due to the arrest of Mahatma Gandhi and others during the Quit India movement. He and his friends started making plans to join the movement. This came to the notice of the police, who arrested TaRaSu and jailed him. He was released in the month of December 1942. He decided that he was not going to study further unless India attains independence. He was an atheist in early life but converted into a believer in the later stages.

== Family ==
TaRaSu comes from a literary family. Subbarao was married to Ambuja. His niece Vishalakshi Dakshinamurthy, is a notable Kannada Novelist and writer famous for her novel based film Jeevana Chaitra which starred Rajkumar, well known Kannada Actor. TaSu Sham Rao, was also related to TaRaSu.

== Career ==
=== As a journalist ===
In 1942, TaRaSu went to Bangalore and joined as a sub-editor for the Kannada newspaper, VishwaKarnataka, earning a sum of Rs. 25 as salary per month. During this period, he married Ambuja. He later worked for the Prajamatha, Vahini and Navodaya newspapers. His career in journalism also included a stint with Prajavani, Mysuru, Kaladoota and Vicharavani newspapers.

=== As a writer ===
TaRaSu was initially influenced by the Pragatisheela writings of the Kannada scholar A. N. Krishna Rao. Hence, his initial writings belong to the pragatisheela style and contain novels like Purushavatara and Munjavininda Munjavu. These writings mainly deal with the issues faced by the downtrodden and the lower caste society. Occasionally, he also came up with novels that were not of this genre, like Chandavalliya Thota which was based on a Gandhian theme of rural life in India. Some of his most celebrated novels include Masanada Hoovu, which talks about the plight of prostitutes and Hamsa Geethe, which talks about the life of a musician in the context of Chitradurga being passed from the hands of the Palegars to Hyder Ali. Both of these novels have been made into films in Kannada. Hamsageethe was chosen as a text book for graduation classes and a Hindi film, Basant Bahar, was based on it.

TaRaSu has also written many historical novels, the most famous being Durgaastamana (fall of the Durga fort), which won him the Sahitya Akademi award in 1985. This was the last novel that he wrote and it talks of the fall of Chitradurga Palegars under the hands of Hyder Ali. His another historical novel based on Chitradurga's history is Kambaniya Kuyilu and its sequels Tirugubana and Raktaratri. He also wrote a novel called Shilpashree which is based on Chavundaraya, the person who commissioned the statue of Bahubali at Shravanabelagola. For nearly two decades, much of the historical source material for his numerous novels were sufficed by the eminent Indian historian S. Srikanta Sastri. Sastri even wrote an erudite and scholarly foreword to one of Ta. Ra. Su.'s famous novels – "Nrupatunga". TaRaSu experimented with various narrative styles and was the first author to introduce the stream-of-consciousness literary technique in Kannada. He also used the Indian independence movement as a background in his novels, like Rakta Tarpana. When the Navya (modernist) movement of Kannada literature was in its infancy, TaRaSu contributed to its growth by coming up with various books belonging to this genre, like his collection of short stories, Girimalligeya Nandanadalli which shows the confusion during the shift from progressive to modernist form of literature.

== Later life ==
TaRaSu had planned to write many more books but they remained incomplete. This includes his autobiography, Hindirugi Nodidaaga (As I look back). He died on 10 Apr 1984. The autobiography was completed by his wife and released in 1990.

== Bibliography ==
- Hamsa Geethe
- ''Akkammana Bhagya'' (Akkamma's fate)
- Agni ratha – Mukti Patha
- Akasmika (Unexpected) - Made into a film of the same name starring Rajkumar, Geetha and Madhavi
- Aparadhi (Convict) - Rajkumar's Aakasmika was based on three stories of which this was one
- Eradu HeNNu, Ondu Gandu (Two women, one man)- The movie Naagarahaavu was based on three stories of which this was one
- Ella Avana Hesaralle (All in His name)
- Omme nakka nagu
- Kambaniya kuyilu (Saga of tears)
- Kannu tereyitu (The eye opened)
- Kasturi kankaNa
- KarNakashi
- Karkotaka
- KeerthinarayaNa
- Kedige Vana (Forest of Kaitha flowers)
- Khota noTu (Counterfeit note)
- GrahaNa biTTitu (Eclipse has ended)
- GaaLi maatu (Rumour) - Made into a film starring Lakshmi and Jai Jagdish, directed by Dorai–Bhagavan
- Gruha pravesha (House warming)
- Chandanada Gombe (Sandalwood doll)- Made into a film starring Lakshmi and Anant Nag, directed by Dorai–Bhagavan
- ChandavaLLiya ThoTa (Chandavalli garden) - Made into a film starring Rajkumar and Jayanthi, directed by Paketi Shivaram
- Chakrateertha – Made into a film starring Rajkumar and Jayanthi, directed by Dorai–Bhagavan
- Chadurangada mane (The chess house)
- Jeetada jeeva (Bonded life)
- Tirugu baana (Boomerang) - Adapted into a film starring Kalpana Directed by Dorai Bhagavan
- Durgaastamana
- Naagarahaavu (King cobra) - Adapted into a film of the same name starring Vishnuvardhan, Aarathi, Shubha and Ambarish directed by Puttanna Kanagal.
- Nalku * Nalku = ondu (4 * 4 = 1)
- Nayaki (heroine)
- Nrupatunga
- Panjarada pakshi (Caged bird)
- Paringama - One of the stories which was the base for the movie Aakasmika
- Parimalada urulu
- Parijatha
- Purushavatara
- Bangari
- Bayakeya boodi (The ash of desire)
- BiDugaDeya beDi (Seeking freedom) - Made into a film starring Lakshmi and Anant Nag Directed by Dorai–Bhagavan
- Benkiya bale (Web of fire) - Made into a film starring Lakshmi and Anant Nag Directed by Duari Bhagavan
- BeLakina beedi
- BeLaku tanda balaka
- BeDada magu (Unwanted child)
- Beli meyda hola (Fence-eating crop)
- Bhagya shilpi (Sculptor of fate)
- Hoysaleshwara Vishnuvardhana (Hoysala emperor Vishnuvardhana)
- Manege banda Mahalakshmi
- Maralu setuve (Bridge of sand)
- MasaNada Hoovu (Flower in a cemetery) - Made into a film
- Margadarshi
- Munjavininda Munjavu (Dawn to dawn)
- Modala nota (First sight)
- Yaksha Prashne
- Rakta tarpaNa (Offering of blood)
- Rakta raatri (Blood night)
- Rajyadaaha (Lust for empire)
- Rajya droha (Betrayal of the empire)
- Chakreshwari (Story of Shree Chakra)
- Sarpa Matsara - one of the stories which was the base for the movie Naagarahaavu

The novels Kambaniya Kuyilu, Rakta Ratri, Tirugu BaaNa, Hosahagalu, Vijayotsava, Rajyadaaha, Kasturi KankaNa and Durgaastamaana are part of his historical saga of Chitradurga.
