= List of Telugu films of 1963 =

This is a list of films produced by the Tollywood film industry based in Hyderabad, Andhra Pradesh in 1963.

Title	Director	Cast	Music director
Aapta Mitrulu	K. B. Nagabhushanam	N. T. Rama Rao, Kanta Rao, Krishna Kumari, Rajasulochana, P. Kannamba	Ghantasala
Anubandhalu	P. S. Ramakrishna Rao	Jaggayya, Krishna Kumari, Gummadi, Suryakantam	M. B. Sreenivasan
Anuragam	G. Ramineedu	P. Bhanumathi, Gummadi, Sowcar Janaki, Haranath, Vasanthi, Chalam	Pendyala Nageswara Rao
Bandipotu	B. Vittalacharya	N. T. Rama Rao, Krishna Kumari	Ghantasala
Bangaru Thimmaraju	G. Viswanadham	Kanta Rao, Rajasree	S. P. Kodandapani
Chaduvukunna Ammayilu	A. Subba Rao	A. Nageswara Rao, Savitri, Sobhan Babu, Krishna Kumari	S. Rajeswara Rao
Constable Koothuru	Tapi Chanakya	Kanta Rao, Krishna Kumari, Jaggayya, Gummadi	R. Govardhanam
Deva Sundari	H. V. Babu	Kanta Rao, Sowcar Janaki	S. Dakshinamurthi
Edureeta	B. S. Narayana	Kanta Rao, Krishna Kumari	K. V. Mahadevan
Eedu Jodu	K. B. Tilak	Jaggayya, Jamuna, Chalam, Manimala	Pendyala Nageswara Rao
Guruvunu Minchina Sishyudu	B. Vittalacharya	Kanta Rao, Krishna Kumari	S. P. Kodandapani
Irugu Porugu	I. N. Murthy	N. T. Rama Rao, Krishna Kumari, Sobhan Babu	Master Venu
Lakshadhikari	V. Madhusudhana Rao	N. T. Rama Rao, Krishna Kumari	T. Chalapathi Rao
Lava Kusa	C. Pullaiah, C. S. Rao	N. T. Rama Rao, Anjali Devi, Kanta Rao, Sobhan Babu	Ghantasala
Manchi Chedu	T. R. Ramanna	N. T. Rama Rao, B. Saroja Devi, Sobhan Babu, J. V. Ramana Murthi, Chhaya Devi	Viswanathan–Ramamoorthy
Naga Devata (Dub)	Shantilal Soni	Mahipal, Anjali Devi, Shashikala, B. M. Vyas, Leela Chitnis, Niranajan Sharma	S.P. Kodandapani
Nartanasala	K. Kameswara Rao	N. T. Rama Rao, Savitri, S. V. Ranga Rao, Kanta Rao, Sobhan Babu	S. Dakshinamurthi
Paruvu-Prathishta	M. Appa Rao	N. T. Rama Rao, Anjali Devi	Pendyala Nageswara Rao
Pempudu Koothuru	B. R. Panthulu	N. T. Rama Rao, Sowcar Janaki, Haranath, Devika	T. G. Lingappa
Punarjanma	K. Pratyagatma	A. Nageswara Rao, Krishna Kumari	T. Chalapathi Rao
Savati Koduku	Y. Ranga Rao	N. T. Rama Rao, Sowcar Janaki	Satyam
Somavara Vratha Mahathyam	R. M. Krishnaswamy	Kanta Rao, Devika, Sobhan Babu	Master Venu
Sri Krishnarjuna Yuddhamu	K. V. Reddy	N. T. Rama Rao, A. Nageswara Rao, B. Saroja Devi, Kanta Rao, Sriranjani, Chhaya Devi, Dhulipala	Pendyala Nageswara Rao
Thalli Biddalu	P. S. Srinivasa Rao	Balayya, Haranath, Krishna Kumari, Rajasree	B. Shankara Rao
Sri Tirupatamma Katha	B. S. Narayana	N. T. Rama Rao, Krishna Kumari, Ramakrishna	P. Venkateswara Rao
Thobuttuvulu	C. V. Ranganath Das	Kanta Rao, Savitri, Jaggayya, Jamuna, Sharada	C. Mohan Das
Valmiki	C. S. Rao	N. T. Rama Rao, Kanta Rao, Rajasulochana, Leelavathi, Sharada	Ghantasala
Vishnu Maya	Nammalvar	Kanta Rao, Jayanthi	Malleswara Rao
