= Visala Hrudayalu =

- Theatrical release poster
- Directed by: B. S. Narayana
- Written by: Bollimunta Sivaramakrishna (dialogues)
- Produced by: Donepudi Krishna Murthy
- Starring: N. T. Rama Rao; Krishna Kumari
- Cinematography: K. Ramachandra
- Edited by: G. D. Joshi
- Music by: T. V. Raju
- Production company: Gokul Art Pictures
- Release date: 9 September 1965
- Running time: 125 minutes
- Country: India
- Language: Telugu

Visala Hrudayalu (transl. Broad Hearts) is a 1965 Indian Telugu-language drama film, produced by Donepudi Krishna Murthy and directed by B. S. Narayana. It stars N. T. Rama Rao and Krishna Kumari, with music composed by T. V. Raju. The film's title was earlier announced as Preminchi Pelli Chesuko before getting renamed. The movie is a remake of 1963 Kannada movie Mana Mecchida Madadi.

== Cast ==
- N. T. Rama Rao as Shankar
- Krishna Kumari as Parvathi
- V. Nagayya as Bhadraiah
- Relangi as Ramadasu
- Gummadi as Viswanatham
- Nagabhushanam as Pattabhi
- Chalam as Manohar
- Chadalavada
- Girija as Shanta
- Hemalatha as Janakamma
- Chandrakala as Indira
- Radha Kumari

== Soundtrack ==
Visala Hrudayalu

Film score by T. V. Raju
- Released: 1965
- Genre: Soundtrack
- Length: 17:13
- Producer: T. V. Raju

Music composed by T. V. Raju.

| S. No. | Song title | Lyrics | Singers | length |
|---|---|---|---|---|
| 1 | "Kalisina Kannulu Emannavi" | Dasaradhi | Ghantasala, P. Susheela | 3:48 |
| 2 | "Okka Maata" | Rajasri | Madhavapeddi Satyam, K. Rani | 3:07 |
| 3 | "O Cinnoda" | Rajasri | S. Janaki | 3:31 |
| 4 | "Randi Randi Cheyi Kalapandi" | Chiranjeevi | Ghantasala | 3:53 |
| 5 | "Emantunnadi Ni Hrudayam" | Rajasri | Pithapuram, S. Janaki | 2:54 |
