= Beedala Patlu =

- Theatrical release poster
- Directed by: B. Vittalacharya
- Written by: D. V. Narasa Raju (dialogues)
- Based on: Les Misérables by Victor Hugo
- Produced by: B. Vittalacharya
- Starring: Akkineni Nageswara Rao; Krishna Kumari
- Cinematography: S. Venkataratnam
- Edited by: G. Viswanath
- Music by: K. V. Mahadevan
- Production companies: Sri Vital Productions & Co
- Release date: 11 February 1972
- Running time: 153 mins
- Country: India
- Language: Telugu

Beedala Patlu (transl. The Plight of the Poor) is a 1972 Indian Telugu-language drama film, produced and directed by B. Vittalacharya. It stars Akkineni Nageswara Rao and Krishna Kumari, with music composed by K. V. Mahadevan. The film is based on the 1862 French novel Les Misérables, written by Victor Hugo.

== Cast ==
- Akkineni Nageswara Rao as Kotayya / Dayanidhi / K V Purushottam
- Krishna Kumari as Shantha
- V. Nagayya as Father
- Gummadi as Inspector Javert
- Rao Gopal Rao as Raobahadoor Raja Ram Mohan Rao
- Satyanarayana as Ram Gopal
- Allu Ramalingaiah as Surayya
- Chandra Mohan as Arun Kumar
- Suryakantham as Kanthamma
- Chandrakala as Padma
- Vijaya Lalitha as Seetha

== Soundtrack ==
Beedala Patlu

Film score by K. V. Mahadevan
- Released: 1972
- Genre: Soundtrack
- Length: 14:53
- Producer: K. V. Mahadevan

K. V. Mahadevan chronology
Bharya Biddalu (1972)	Beedala Patlu (1972)	Beedala Patlu (1972)

Music composed by K. V. Mahadevan.

S. No.	Song title	Lyrics	Singers	length
1	"Nenevaro Telisindi"	C. Narayana Reddy	Ghantasala	3:43
2	"Dabbu Lone Unnadira"	G. K. Murthy	Ghantasala, P. B. Sreenivas, J. V. Raghavulu	4:02
3	"Daarina Poye Ayyallaara"	Kosaraju	L. R. Eswari	3:56
4	"Paala Navvula Paapaayi"	C. Narayana Reddy	Ghantasala	3:12

== See also ==
- Adaptations of Les Misérables
