= Tamil Nadu Talkies =

Indian film production company

Tamil Nadu Talkies was an Indian film production company producing films in Telugu and Tamil languages. Headed by S. Soundararajan, it was founded in the 1930s. Tamil Nadu Talkies was one of the foremost names in early Tamil cinema from the 1930s through 1950s, but later fell into obscurity.

Telugu film actors Gummadi and Krishna Kumari made their debut through the films produced by the company.

== Films produced ==
- Bhaktha Naradar (1942)
- Chenchu Lakshmi (1943)
- Pankajavalli (1947)
- Adrushtadeepudu (1950)
- Navvite Navaratnalu (1951)
