= Amrithavaahini =

- Directed by: J. Sasikumar
- Starring: Prem Nazir; Sharada; Thikkurisi Sukumaran Nair; Adoor Bhasi
- Music by: A. T. Ummer
- Release date: 23 December 1976
- Country: India
- Language: Malayalam

Amrithavaahini is a 1976 Indian Malayalam film, directed by J. Sasikumar. The film stars Prem Nazir, Sharada, Thikkurisi Sukumaran Nair and Adoor Bhasi in the lead roles. The film's musical score was composed by A. T. Ummer. The film was a remake of the 1963 Telugu movie Punarjanma which was also remade in Tamil in 1970 as Engirundho Vandhaal and in Hindi in 1970 as Khilona.

== Cast ==
- Prem Nazir as Vijayan
- Thikkurisi Sukumaran Nair as Thampi
- Adoor Bhasi as Vinod
- Sharada as Geetha
- Jayan as Mohan
- Kaviyoor Ponnamma as Lakshmi
- Prathapachandran as Doctor
- Sukumari as Sumathi
- Shoba as Rani
- Sankaradi as Madhava Kurup
- Meena as Dakshyayani
- Sadhana
- Reena as Thulasi
- Nellikode Bhaskaran as Paramu Nair
- M. G. Soman as Sudhakaran
- Sreelatha Namboothiri as Daisy
- P. R. Menon

== Soundtrack ==
The music was composed by A. T. Ummer and the lyrics were written by Sreekumaran Thampi, Adoor Bhasi and Bharanikkavu Sivakumar.

No.	Song	Singers	Lyrics	Length (m:ss)
1	"Abhayadeepame"	S. Janaki	Sreekumaran Thampi	
2	"Angaadi Marunnukal"	Adoor Bhasi, Sreelatha Namboothiri	Adoor Bhasi	
3	"Chembarathikkaadu"	K. J. Yesudas	Sreekumaran Thampi	
4	"Iruttil Koluthivacha"	K. J. Yesudas	Sreekumaran Thampi	
5	"Kodunkatte Nee"	S. Janaki	Sreekumaran Thampi	
6	"Marubhoomiyil Vanna Maadhavame"	K. J. Yesudas	Sreekumaran Thampi	
7	"Vrindaavanam Swargamaakkiya"	Ambili	Bharanikkavu Sivakumar	
