= Nandi Awards of 1976 =

Indian Telugu film and TV awards ceremony

The Nandi Awards, first awarded in 1964, were presented annually by the Government of Andhra Pradesh to recognise excellence in Telugu cinema. The following won the best films awards in 1976.

== 1976 Nandi Awards Winners List ==
Category	Winner	Film
Best Feature Film	B. S. Narayana	Oorummadi Brathukulu
Second Best Feature Film	C. S. Rao	Mahakavi Kshetrayya
Third Best Feature Film	K. Balachander	Anthuleni Katha
