= Vagdanam =

- Theatrical release poster
- Directed by: Acharya Aatreya
- Screenplay by: Acharya Aatreya; Bollimunta Sivaramakrishna
- Based on: Datta by Saratchandra Chatterjee
- Produced by: K. Satyanarayana; D. Srirama Murthy
- Starring: Akkineni Nageshwara Rao; Krishna Kumari
- Cinematography: P. L. Roy; V. Roy
- Edited by: N. S. Prakasam
- Music by: Pendyala Nageshwara Rao
- Production company: Kavitha Chitra
- Release date: 5 October 1961
- Running time: 153 minutes
- Country: India
- Language: Telugu

Vagdanam (transl. Promise) is a 1961 Indian Telugu-language drama film, written and directed by Acharya Aatreya. The film stars Akkineni Nageswara Rao and Krishna Kumari, with music composed by Pendyala. It is based on the novel Datta, written by Saratchandra Chatterjee. The film was a box office failure.

== Cast ==
- Akkineni Nageswara Rao as Suryam
- Krishna Kumari as Vijaya
- Gummadi as Ranganatham
- Chalam as Chandram
- V. Nagayya as Zamindar Vishwanatham
- Relangi as Ramadasu
- Padmanabham as Padmanabham
- Suryakantham as Balamani
- Girija as Radha
- Surabhi Kamalabai as Bujjamma

== Soundtrack ==
Music composed by Pendyala. "Sri Nagaja Tanayam", penned by Sri Sri, is considered one of the first songs describing Seeta Kalyanam in Harikatha format.

S. No	Song title	Lyrics	Singers	length
1	"Naa Kanti Papalo Nilichipora"	Dasaradhi	Ghantasala, P. Susheela	4:43
2	"Bangaru Naava"	Acharya Aatreya	P. Susheela	3:25
3	"Kaasipatnam Chudarababu"	Sri Sri	Ghantasala, P. Susheela	3:53
4	"Maa Kittayya Puttinadinam"	Acharya Aatreya	Pithapuram, S. Janaki, B. Vasantha	4:58
5	"Tappatlo Talalo"	Narla Chiranjeevi	S. Janaki, B. Vasantha, Sarojini	3:28
6	"Vanne Chinnelanni"	Acharya Aatreya	Ghantasala	3:38
7	"Velugu Chupavaya"	Acharya Aatreya	Ghantasala, P. Susheela	3:17
8	"Sri Nagaja Tanayam" (Harikatha)	Sri Sri	Ghantasala	6:41
