= Haranath =

Haranath may refer to:

- Haranath (actor) (1936-1989), Telugu actor
- Haranath Chakraborty, Bengali film director
