= Kadaladu Vadaladu =

1969 film directed by B. Vittalacharya

- Theatrical release poster
- Directed by: B. Vittalacharya
- Written by: Veeturi
- Produced by: K. Seetharama Swamy; G. Subba Rao
- Starring: N. T. Rama Rao; J. Jayalalithaa
- Cinematography: H. S. Venu
- Edited by: K. Govinda Swamy
- Music by: T. V. Raju
- Production company: Sri Lakshmi Narayana Combines
- Release date: 9 July 1969
- Running time: 161 minutes
- Country: India
- Language: Telugu

Kadaladu Vadaladu (transl. Does not move, does not leave) is a 1969 Indian Telugu-language swashbuckler film, produced by K. Seetharama Swamy and G. Subba Rao and directed by B. Vittalacharya. It stars N. T. Rama Rao and J. Jayalalithaa. The film revolves around the efforts of a prince to prove the innocence of his wrongfully convicted mother. It was released on 9 July 1969 and became a success.

== Cast ==
- N. T. Rama Rao as Vikrama Simha
- J. Jayalalithaa as Madhumathi
- Satyanarayana as Kiriti
- Ramakrishna as Vinoda Varma
- Mikkilineni as Veerasenudu
- Dhulipala as Anagapala Maharaju
- Mukkamala as Mahamantri Charuvakudu
- S. V. Ramadasu as Bhujanga Rayulu
- Tyagaraju as Dindima Varma
- Vijaya Lalitha as Sukanya Devi
- Hemalatha as Vinutha Devi
- Chayadevi as Saritha Devi
- Balakrishna as Gajapathi
- Master Visweswara Rao

== Production ==
After the success of 1967's Chikkadu Dorakadu, its director B. Vittalacharya announced his next film to be Kadaladu Vadaladu, a title he developed in a "jiffy". The film was produced by K. Seetharama Swamy and G. Subba Rao of Sri Lakshmi Narayana Combines, and written by Veeturi. Cinematography was handled by H. S. Venu, and editing by K. Govinda Swamy. Sivaiah was the action choreographer. The film's outdoor scenes were taken at Guindy Reserve Forest in Madras.

== Soundtrack ==
The soundtrack was composed by T. V. Raju.

S. No.	Song title	Lyrics	Singers	length
1	"Yanda Vaana"	Veeturi	Ghantasala	4:07
2	"Bullamma Sowkyamena"	Veeturi	Ghantasal, P. Susheela	4:11
3	"Ekkada Vaade Akkada Vaade"	C. Narayana Reddy	P. Susheela	3:50
4	"Komma Komma"	C. Narayana Reddy	P. Susheela	3:21
5	"O Muddulolike Muddabanthi"	C. Narayana Reddy	Ghantasala, P. Susheela	3:53
6	"Vaare Vaare"	Kosaraju	P. Susheela	2:50
7	"Andisthuna Anduko"	Daasarathi Krishnamacharyulu	P. Susheela	3:43
8	"Katko Katko"	C. Narayana Reddy	Ghantasala, P. Susheela	3:15

== Release and reception ==
Kadaladu Vadaladu was released on 9 July 1969. Reviewing the film on 25 July 1969, Rayudu AVS of Zamin Ryot criticised the film's story and screenplay while noting that only Rama Rao's performance reaches the audience expectations. The film performed well commercially in urban areas, and much stronger in rural areas.
