= Bandipotu =

Bandipotu may refer to:

- Bandipotu (2015 film), an Indian Telugu-language heist comedy film
- Bandipotu (1963 film), an Indian Telugu-language swashbuckler film
