= Leta Manasulu =

Leta Manasulu (lit. 'tender minds') may refer to:

- Leta Manasulu (1966 film), an Indian Telugu-language film
- Letha Manasulu (2004 film), an Indian Telugu-language romantic drama film
