= Bollimunta =

Bollimunta (Telugu: బొల్లిముంత) is a Telugu surname:

- Bollimunta Sivaramakrishna (1920–2005), Indian writer
