= Bhaktha Naradar =

- Directed by: S. Soundararajan
- Produced by: S. Soundararajan
- Starring: Ranjan; Rukmini; Kothamangalam Subbu; Kothamangalam Seenu
- Cinematography: B. S. Ranga
- Music by: Songs: Papanasam Sivan; Background music: M. D. Parthasarathy; S. Rajeswara Rao
- Production company: Tamil Nadu Talkies
- Release date: 25 April 1942 (India)
- Country: India
- Language: Tamil

Bhaktha Naradar is a 1942 Indian Tamil language film directed by S. Soundararajan. The film stars Ranjan and Rukmini.

== Plot ==
The film narrates the life story of Naradar, a travelling singer character popular in Hindu myth. Saraswathi, learns from her husband Brahma about Vishnu assuming the avatar of Narada. She desires to be his mother. Mohana, a devadasi, finds a baby girl in the bathroom and names her Kalavathi. Mohana grooms Kala to become an accomplished woman. The king wants to marry kala, but she turns him down. Mohana decides to marry Kala to the first person she meets at daybreak. Brahma, disguised as a sanyasi meets Kala and the marriage is performed at once! A divine baby is born, and named Narada! The king banishes the whole family. Narada wanders and gets hold of a veena, a musical instrument. The rest of the story deals with the many adventures by Narada and other mythological characters.

== Cast ==
The following list is adapted from the film's review article published in The Hindu.

Male cast

- Ranjan as Naradar
- Kothamangalam Subbu as Brahma
- T. E. Krishnamachari as Nalini's Guru
- Kothamangalam Seenu
- L. Narayana Rao
- M. V. Mani
- Murali

Female cast

- Rukmini as Nalini
- Baby Jaya as Baby Naradar
- M. S. Vijayal as Saraswathi and Kalavathi
- T. N. Meenakshi as Mohana
- S. R. Vijaya
- M. S. Sundari Bai
- Kumari

== Production ==
The film was produced by S. Soundararajan Aiyangar with his film name Soundararajan under his own banner Tamil Nadu Talkies. (It was much later that the State was named Tamil Nadu.) Ranjan (original name, Ramnarayan Venkataramana Sarma) played the role of Narada for the second time, the first being in Rishya Shringar the previous year. The film was produced at Gemini Studios. This was the first film for B. S. Ranga as cinematographer.

== Soundtrack ==
Papanasam Sivan penned the lyrics and composed the tunes. M. D. Parthasarathy and S. Rajeswara Rao set the background music using the Gemini Studios company orchestra.

== Reception ==
Writing in 2010, Film Historian Randor Guy said the film is "Remembered for the interesting story line and taut narration by the director."
