= Bhuvana Sundari Katha =

- Theatrical release poster
- Directed by: C. Pullaiah
- Screenplay by: L. N. Acharya
- Story by: G.V.G
- Produced by: Thota Subba Rao
- Starring: N. T. Rama Rao; Krishna Kumari
- Cinematography: C. Nageswara Rao
- Edited by: B. Gopal Rao
- Music by: Ghantasala
- Production company: Sridevi Productions
- Release date: 7 April 1967
- Running time: 155 minutes
- Country: India
- Language: Telugu

Bhuvana Sundari Katha (transl. The story of Bhuvana Sundari) is a 1967 Indian Telugu-language swashbuckler film directed by C. Pullaiah. It stars N. T. Rama Rao and Krishna Kumari, with music composed by Ghantasala.

== Cast ==
- N. T. Rama Rao as Chandra Senudu
- Krishna Kumari as Bhuvana Sundari
- Satyanarayana as Devadatta
- Mikkilineni as Hiranyavarma
- Dhulipala as Rajagaru
- Udaya Kumar as Tippayya
- Mukkamala as Chitrasenudu
- Allu Ramalingaiah as Bujjaiah
- Vanisri as Ellamma
- Chaya Devi as Hiranyavarma's wife

== Soundtrack ==
Music composed by Ghantasala.

Song title	Lyrics	Singers	length
"Desa Desamulu"	Kosaraju	L. R. Eswari, Raghavulu, Ramana	4:09
"Entha Chilipi"	C. Narayana Reddy	P. Susheela, P. Leela	4:15
"Naa Sogasu Rammandhi"	C. Narayana Reddy	P. Susheela	4:16
"Elli Naatho"	Kosaraju	Ghantasala	2:25
"Evarikainaa"	Sri Sri	Ghantasala	3:08
"Hridayam Nindaa"	Dasaradhi	P. Susheela	3:21
