= Sri Valli (1961 film) =

- Theatrical release poster
- Directed by: T. R. Ramanna
- Screenplay by: Thanjai N. Ramaiah Dass
- Produced by: K. Venkatesan; L. Venkatraman
- Starring: Sivaji Ganesan; Padmini
- Cinematography: K. H. Kapadia; Babubhai Mistry
- Edited by: R. Rajagopal
- Music by: G. Ramanathan
- Production company: Narasu Studios
- Release date: 1 July 1961
- Country: India
- Language: Tamil

Sri Valli is a 1961 Indian Tamil-language Hindu mythological film directed by T. R. Ramanna. Based on the folk tale of Valli, the film stars Sivaji Ganesan and Padmini, supported by T. R. Mahalingam, E. R. Sahadevan, C. K. Saraswathi and J. P. Chandrababu. This film was taken in Gevacolor. It was released on 1 July 1961 and was not successful. The film also featured Lakshmi in her on-screen debut as the child version of the titular character.

== Plot ==
Goddess Valli had her heart and soul dedicated to Lord Subramanya and would always pray with fervent devotion and love, to be with Him. The Lord was moved by the highest form of love expressed by the mountain princess, and so He planned to appease Her in person by creating the perfect situation after the enactment of His Lila.

The mountain chief planned to develop a field for growing millet and assigned Valli to take charge of protecting the field from birds and animals who might devour the crops. Lord Murugan saw this as an opportunity to meet the Goddess, and therefore He assumed the form of a handsome tribal hunter and appeared before her as if he had lost his way on chasing a deer during hunting. Valli did not recognise the stranger and promptly asked him to leave the place. The Hunter was about to leave and at that moment the chief was returning to the place bringing honey and fruits for Valli. God, in order to avoid being caught, turned himself into a tree. After the chief and his followers left the place, God changed back into the hunter form and proposed his love to Valli.

The princess who had only the Mountain God in her heart was infuriated at the proposal and lashed out at the hunter. (This form of Lord Muruga called the 'Veduvan Kolam' can be seen at the Lord Palaniapaar temple at Belukurichi). The chief and his followers were again returning to the place, so the hunter changed himself into an old man, without being noticed by Valli. The chief, on seeing the old man, requested him to stay with Valli till they returned from the hunt.

The old man was hungry and asked Valli for food, she gave Him a mixture of millet flour and honey, but it made him thirsty and He asked for water. She provided water from a nearby stream and the Lord jokingly remarked that she had satisfied his thirst and she could quench his thirst for a companion. The Goddess has angered again and started to leave the place. The Lord requested assistance from His brother, Lord Ganesha to appear as a wild elephant at that time. On seeing the wild elephant, Valli was scared and ran back to the old man, pleading with Him to save Her from the elephant. Lord Muruga proposed to save Her only if She agreed to marry Him. In the heat of the moment, she agrees and the Lord reveals His true form. It was then Valli realised that it was her beloved Lord, who was with her all the time. After the millet harvest was over, the chief with his daughter and entourage returned to their native land. The Lord again returned for His devotee and The Divine Couple enjoyed their time away from Valli's family. Nambi Raja on being alerted about Valli's absence flew into a rage and went in search of Her. When they finally found The Lord along with Valli, the chief and followers shot arrows at Him, but they all failed to even touch the Lord and instead, the chief and his sons fell lifeless. Goddess Valli was disheartened to see the lifeless bodies of her kith and kin and requested the Lord to bring them back to life. Lord Murugan instructed Her to revive them Herself and by Her mere touch, everyone was brought back to life. The chief Nambi Raja and his tribesmen realised that it was their God of Mountains, in the form of the old man and prayed to Him. Lord Muruga took his true form and blessed the tribesmen, and the chief conducted the marriage of his daughter and the Lord.

== Cast ==
Cast adapted from the film's song book and the opening credits:

Male cast

- Sivaji Ganesan as Lord Muruga
- T. R. Mahalingam as Narada
- E. R. Sahadevan as Nambi Raja
- J. P. Chandrababu as Valli's brother
- V. R. Rajagopal as Killi
- C. R. Parthiban as Lord Shiva
- Master Vijayakumar as Child Muruga

Female cast

- Padmini as Valli
- Ragini as Valli's friend
- Kumari Rukmini as Deivaanai/Devasena
- Helen as a Dancer
- Baby Uma as Valli's sister
- C. K. Saraswathi as Nambi Raja's wife
- Baby Lakshmi as Child Valli

Supporting cast

- C. S. Pandian, Chittam Pillai Venkataraman, S. V. Shanmugam, Karikol Raj, Nandi Velayutham, Ramaiah, Ponnandi, Subramaniam, Pattammal, Vathsala.

== Production ==
After the success of Amara Deepam (1956), director T. Prakash Rao and co-writer C. V. Sridhar wanted their next film to be on a grander scale. Rao decided on the folk tale of Valli, and he and Sridhar approached Sivaji Ganesan to star. Ganesan refused, saying another producer was adapting the story (as Sri Valli) and paid him an advance to star in it. The film was directed by T. R. Ramanna, while Thanjai N. Ramaiah Dass wrote the screenplay. Actor Vijayakumar made his debut through the film playing the younger role of Muruga, and Lakshmi too made her debut through the film playing the younger role of Valli. T. R. Mahalingam, who portrayed Muruga in the 1945 film version of Sri Valli, portrayed Narada in this film. This was the first Tamil film based on Valli to be in colour as the previous ones were in black-and-white. The film was colourised using Gevacolor.

== Soundtrack ==
This album contains 20 songs composed by G. Ramanathan, written by Thanjai N. Ramaiah Dass.

| Song | Singers | Length |
|---|---|---|
| "Vigna Vinaayagaa" | Seerkazhi Govindarajan | 01:35 |
| "Unakkaagavae Pirandha Azhagan" | T. R. Mahalingam | 03:33 |
| "Chinnanjiru Kuruvigala" | P. Susheela and chorus | 04:17 |
| "Vanna Thaamaraiyil Minnum Neerkumizhi" | Seerkazhi Govindarajan | 01:59 |
| "Nittham Iranggi Varuvaai" | A. P. Komala & A. G. Rathnamala | 02:51 |
| "Vannamigum Paravaigalaa" | T. M. Soundararajan & P. Susheela | 03:44 |
| "Aiyo Machaan Mannaaru" | J. P. Chandrababu | 01:57 |
| "Thanthaikku Annalil" | T. R. Mahalingam and chorus | 02:10 |
| "Vanthanga Maappillainga" | P. Susheela and chorus | 04:00 |
| "Maanai Thedi Vandhavare" | Jikki | 02:53 |
| "Aadhi Andham Illaadha" | T. M. Soundararajan | 02:25 |
| "Yechuputten Naan Yechuputten" | Seerkazhi Govindarajan & P. Susheela | 03:58 |
| "Paayaadha Kadal Paayaa" | T. M. Soundararajan | 03:44 |
| "Mogana Punnagaiyil" | T. R. Mahalingam | 01:59 |
| "Thaagam Thanindhadhu Anname" | Seerkazhi Govindarajan & P. Susheela | 02:39 |
| "Malai Naattu Kuravar Naanga" | Jikki | 03:49 |
| "Shanmugaa...Idhayak Koyil Irukka" | P. Susheela | 04:15 |
| "Karpagachcholaiyile" | T. R. Mahalingam | 02:41 |

== Release and reception ==
Sri Valli was released on 1 July 1961. In its review of the film, Kumudam filled a whole page with only two words: "Om Muruga". Kalki appreciated the film's colour sequences, and said the elephant acted the best among the cast. The Indian Express described the film's cinematography and music as its highlights. The film was an average success as Tamil audiences by then were no longer interested in films based on mythology, instead focusing on films set in present day.
