= Maha Prasthanam =

Poem anthology by Srirangam Srinivasarao

- Author: Srirangam Srinivasarao
- Language: Telugu
- Genre: Poetry
- Publication date: 1950
- Publication place: India

Maha Prasthanam is a Telugu-language anthology of poems written by Srirangam Srinivasarao. It is considered an epic and magnum opus in modern Indian poetry. The work is a compilation of poetry written between 1930 and 1940. When it was published in 1950, it redefined the Telugu literary world. Maha Prasthanam meaning The Great Journey to a New World, was also made into an Indian movie by the same name. The book was reprinted for the 31st time in 2010.

== Honour ==
Sri Sri garnered the honoured title of Mahakavi (The Great Poet) after writing this epic.
