= Jay Vejay =

- Theatrical release poster
- Directed by: L. V. Prasad
- Written by: K.B. Pathak (dialogues); Majrooh Sultanpuri (lyrics)
- Screenplay by: L. V. Prasad; K.V. Srinivasan
- Story by: B.V. Acharya
- Based on: Chikkadu Dorakadu (1967)
- Produced by: L. V. Prasad
- Starring: Jeetendra; Reena Roy; Bindiya Goswami; Prem Krishan
- Cinematography: G. Singh
- Edited by: Shivaji Awdhut
- Music by: Rajesh Roshan
- Production company: Prasad Productions Pvt Ltd
- Release date: 1 January 1977
- Running time: 145 minutes
- Country: India
- Language: Hindi

Jay Vejay is a 1977 Indian Hindi-language action film, produced and directed by L. V. Prasad under the Prasad Productions Pvt. Ltd. banner. It stars Jeetendra, Reena Roy, Bindiya Goswami and Prem Krishan, with music composed by Rajesh Roshan. The film is a remake of Telugu film Chikkadu Dorakadu (1967).

== Cast ==
- Jeetendra as Prince Jay D. Singh/Daku Sardar Sher Singh/Garibon Ka Dost
- Prem Krishen as Prince Vijay D. Singh/Senapati Pratap Singh
- Reena Roy as Maharani Ambika
- Bindiya Goswami as Princess Padmavati
- Om Shivpuri as King Dharam Singh
- Satyendra Kapoor as Shambu
- Urmila Bhatt as Queen of Malwa
- Roopesh Kumar as King Diler S. Jung
- Dev Kumar as Shamsher Jung
- Kamal Kapoor as Mahamantri Maan Singh
- Jagdeep as Mangal Singh
- Bhagwan as Sher Singh's victim
- Mohan Sherry as Daku Bhavani Singh
- Vikas Anand as Ram Singh
- Brahm Bhardwaj as Treasures Guard
- Paintal as Damak
- Brahmachari as Chamak
- Viju Khote as Randhir
- Shivraj as Laxmi's Father
- Lalita Pawar as Nandini
- Sarala Yeolekar as Bela
- Lalita Kumari as Rambha
- Jayshree T. as Maneka
- Veena as Chandevli

== Soundtrack ==
#	Title	Singer(s)
1	"Teree Palako Me Kajal"	Mohammed Rafi, Suman Kalyanpur
2	"Badi Door Se"	Mohammed Rafi, Aziz Nazan
3	"Maine To Lakh Jatan Kar Dala"	Lata Mangeshkar, Usha Mangeshkar
4	"Sab Jaanu Re Tori Batiya"	Usha Mangeshkar
5	"Sun Ve Mundeya"	Lata Mangeshkar
6	"O Mata Bhavani"	Lata Mangeshkar
7	"Sone Jaisi Tumhari Jawani"	Bhupinder Singh, Usha Mangeshkar, Asha Bhosle
8	"Yah Habibi"	Anuradha Paudwal

== In popular culture ==
The song "Dhoom Taana" in the film Om Shanti Om pays tribute to Jay Vejay, using a clip of one of its scenes ("Sab Janoon Re Tori Batiyan").
