= Palleturi Chinnodu =

- Theatrical release poster
- Directed by: B. Vittalacharya
- Written by: Bollimuntha Sivarama Krishna (dialogues)
- Produced by: B. Vittalacharya
- Starring: N. T. Rama Rao; Krishnam Raju; Manjula
- Cinematography: S. S. Lal
- Edited by: K. Govinda Swamy
- Music by: K. V. Mahadevan
- Production companies: Sri Vittal Productions & Co
- Release date: 9 January 1974
- Running time: 148 mins
- Country: India
- Language: Telugu

Palleturi Chinnodu (transl. Village boy) is a 1974 Indian Telugu-language drama film, produced and directed by B. Vittalacharya under the Sri Vittal Productions & Co banner. It stars N. T. Rama Rao, Krishnam Raju and Manjula, with music composed by K. V. Mahadevan. The film is a remake of the 1964 Kannada film Chinnada Gombe.

== Cast ==
- N. T. Rama Rao as Lakshmana
- Krishnam Raju as Prasad
- Manjula as Leela
- S. V. Ranga Rao as Ramaiah
- Satyanarayana as Dharma Raju
- Allu Ramalingaiah as Postman Poolaiah
- Raja Babu as Appa Rao
- Mikkilineni as Zamindar
- Balakrishna
- Devika as Janaki
- Vijaya Lalitha as Shanta
- Pandari Bai as Zamindar's wife
- Girija as Konadaveedu Parvatham

== Soundtrack ==
Palleturi Chinnodu

Film score by K. V. Mahadevan
- Released: 1973
- Genre: Soundtrack
- Length: 31:22
- Producer: K. V. Mahadevan

K. V. Mahadevan chronology
Dabbuku Lokam Daasoham (1973)	Palleturi Chinnodu (1973)	Andaru Dongale (1974)

Music composed by K. V. Mahadevan.

S. No	Song title	Lyrics	Singers	length
1	"Manchiki Maruperu"	C. Narayana Reddy	Ghantasala	3:50
2	"Yedo Hayi Kavali"	Vijayaratnam	L. R. Eeswari	3:43
3	"Yem Pattu Pattaavu"	C. Narayana Reddy	P. Susheela	3:47
4	"Mandu Palikinappude"	Bhavanarayana	S. P. Balasubrahmanyam	4:07
5	"Nee Naamamokate"	C. Narayana Reddy	Ghantasala	3:47
6	"Kattheranti"	Vijayaratnam	L. R. Eeswari	4:16
7	"Neellemantunnaayi"	C. Narayana Reddy	P. Susheela, L. R. Eeswari	3:30
8	"Palletoori Chinnavaadu"	C. Narayana Reddy	Ramakrishna, P. Susheela	4:22
