= Then Kinnam =

- VCD cover
- Directed by: K. Krishnamoorthy
- Screenplay by: K. Krishnamoorthy
- Story by: Ayyapillai
- Starring: Nagesh; Vijaya Lalitha; V. K. Ramasamy; Suruli Rajan; M. R. R. Vasu
- Cinematography: Chitti Babu
- Edited by: B. S. Mani
- Music by: Shankar–Ganesh
- Production company: Sri Chitra Mahal Productions
- Release date: 11 December 1971
- Running time: 131 minutes
- Country: India
- Language: Tamil

Then Kinnam (/θeɪn/ transl. Bowl of Honey) is a 1971 Indian Tamil-language romantic comedy film, directed and produced by K. Krishnamoorthy. Music was by Shankar–Ganesh. It stars Nagesh, Vijaya Lalitha, V. K. Ramasamy and M. R. R. Vasu, with Suruli Rajan, Sachu, Thengai Srinivasan, and Vijayachandrika in supporting roles. It was released on 11 December 1971.

== Cast ==
- Nagesh as Mohan
- Vijaya Lalitha as Mala
- Suruli Rajan as Manikkam
- V. K. Ramasamy as Kangasabai
- M. R. R. Vasu as Accountant
- S. N. Lakshmi as Meenakshi
- Thengai Srinivasan as Chithambaram
- Sachu as Rama Sundari
- Rama Rao as Jayaram
- Vijaya Chandrika as Bhanu

== Production ==
For one song sequence, Nagesh sported tiger makeup and clothing. The makers were not initially satisfied with how the sequence initially panned out, until Nagesh asked to do as per his own wish.

== Soundtrack ==
Music was composed by Shankar–Ganesh and lyrics were written by Kumara Devan. The songs "Thenkinnam Thenkinnam" and "Utharavindri Ulley Vaa" attained popularity.

| Song | Singer | Length |
|---|---|---|
| "Thenkinnam Thenkinnam" | P. Suseela | 3:37 |
| "Podanu Soappu Podanum" | T. M. Soundararajan | 3:06 |
| "Kadhalo Kadhaal" | T. M. Soundararajan, L. R. Eswari | 4:06 |
| "Chinna Kutty Ponnu" | T. M. Soundararajan, K. Jamuna Rani | 6:27 |
| "Akkam Pakkam" | T. M. Soundararajan, L. R. Eswari | 3:47 |
| "Utharavindri Ulley Vaa" | T. M. Soundararajan, L. R. Anjali | 5:59 |

== Reception ==
Theekkathir said the "kinnam" (bowl) was beautiful but there was no "then" (honey) in it.
