= Manthiri Kumaran =

- Theatrical release poster
- Directed by: B. Vittalacharya
- Screenplay by: Puratchidasan (dialogues)
- Produced by: Kandasamy; Gopalasamy
- Starring: Kantha Rao; Rajasree; Anuradha
- Cinematography: G. Chandru
- Edited by: K. Govindasamy
- Music by: Rajan–Nagendra
- Production company: Vittal Productions
- Release date: 1963
- Running time: 164 minutes
- Country: India
- Language: Tamil

Manthiri Kumaran (transl. Minister's Son) is a 1963 Indian Tamil-language film directed by B. Vittalacharya. The film stars Kanta Rao, Anuradha and Rajasree.

== Plot ==
Madana, a prince in exile, falls in love with a statue. His friend, Guna Keerthi, realizes that princess Rathnavali resembles the statue and decides to unite the lovelorn prince with Rathnavali.

== Cast ==
The list is adapted from the film titles.

Male cast

- Kantha Rao
- Raja
- Balakrishnan
- Lanka Sathyam
- Satyanarayana

Female cast

- Anuradha
- Rajasree
- Meenakumari
- Jayanthi
- Shanthi

== Production ==
The film was produced by Kandasamy and Gopalasamy and was directed by B. Vittalacharya. The writer was B. V. Acharya. Cinematography was done by G. Chandru While K. Govindasamy was in charge of editing. Art direction was by B. V. Babu. The film was made in Telugu with the title Madana Kamaraju Katha and was released in 1962.

== Soundtrack ==
Music was composed by Rajan–Nagendra while the lyrics were penned by Puratchidasan.

Song	Singer/s	Length
"Ponn Milave Nee Vaa"	P. Susheela	03:15
"Chendu Malli Maalaiyo"	T. M. Soundararajan & P. Susheela	03:20
"Thendral Poongavil Nindraadum"	T. M. Soundararajan & P. Susheela	03:14
"Gadhi Nee Badhrakaali Thaaye"	P. Susheela	01:14
"Seivom Ippave Kalyaanam"	S. C. Krishnan & Jikki	03:24
"Paruvam Konjiya Kannidhu"	P. Susheela	03:25
"Chendu Malli Maalaiyo"	T. M. Soundararajan	03:12
