= Aame Evaru? =

- Poster
- Directed by: B. S. Narayana
- Written by: B. S. Narayana
- Story by: B. S. Narayana
- Produced by: P. S. Veerappa
- Starring: Jaggayya; Jayalalitha
- Music by: Vedha
- Release date: 1966
- Running time: 153 minutes
- Country: India
- Language: Telugu

Aame Evaru? (transl. Who is she?) is a 1966 Indian Telugu-language psychological thriller film, produced and directed by B. S. Narayana. It stars Jaggayya and Jayalalitha with Vanisri, Prabhakar Reddy, Rajababu, Nagabhushanam, Radha and K. Malathi as part of the supporting cast. Music is by Vedha. Lyrics were written by Dasaradhi. The film is a remake of the 1964 Hindi film Woh Kaun Thi?.

== Cast ==
- Jaggayya as Dr. Anand
- Jayalalitha as Santhya/chayya
- Vanisri as Dr. Lata
- Nagabhushanam
- Prabhakar Reddy
- K. Malathi as Anand's Mother
- Rajababu
- Radha
- Rajanala

== Soundtrack ==
The music was composed by Vedha and lyrics were written by Dasaradhi. The songs were reused from the Hindi original, though Vedha was given sole credit. The song "Andaala Ee Reyi" is based on "Lag Jaa Gale" from Woh Kaun Thi.

Song	Singer	Lyrics	Length
"Tikkiriki Tikkiriki Tattata"	P. B. Sreenivas, L. R. Eswari	Dasaradhi	3:29
"Neevu Choose Choopulo"	P. B. Sreenivas, L. R. Eswari	Dasaradhi	3:30
"Kanne Manasu"	L. R. Eswari	Dasaradhi	4:43
"Andaala Ee Reyi"	P. Susheela	Dasaradhi	3:33
"O Naa Raja Raava"	P. Susheela	Dasaradhi	6:14
"Nee Kannula Lo Na Kannera"	P. Susheela	Dasaradhi	3:12
"Anda Chandala"	P. Susheela	Dasaradhi	2:25
