= Mullaivanam =

- Poster
- Directed by: V. Krishnan
- Written by: A. K. Velan (dialogues)
- Story by: K. Sriramachandran
- Produced by: V. Krishnan
- Starring: Sriram; Kumari Rukmani
- Cinematography: V. Krishnan
- Edited by: T. Vijayarangam
- Music by: K. V. Mahadevan
- Production company: Aravind Pictures
- Distributed by: Aravind Pictures
- Release date: 11 March 1955
- Running time: 14351 ft.
- Country: India
- Language: Tamil

Mullaivanam is a 1955 Indian Tamil language film produced and directed by V. Krishnan. The film stars Sriram (Madurai Sriram Naidu) and Kumari Rukmini. It was released on 11 March 1955.

== Plot ==
A woman—Bhavani—travels in an old Postal Delivery van. Another passenger tells a story to her. There was a young woman who was in love with someone. But she had to marry her aunt's brother being forced by the aunt. Her husband is a crooked person. However, during the marriage ceremony the thaali (mangala sutra) goes missing and so the ceremony is halted. How the young woman marries her lover forms the rest of the story.

== Cast ==
- Sriram
- Kumari Rukmani
- P. S. Veerappa
- P. S. Gnanam
- A. Karunanidhi
- S. A. Natarajan

== Production ==
The film is one of the many films produced by V. Krishnan who owned Aravind Pictures in Coimbatore. The dances were by Rajeswari and Lalitha Rao. Choreographer is a well-known natuvanaar, Vazhuvoor B. Ramaiyah Pillai. The film was produced at Central Studios, Coimbatore.

== Soundtrack ==
Music was composed by K. V. Mahadevan. A Thirupugazh by Arunagirinathar Swamigal was included in the film.

Song	Singer/s	Lyricist
"Engirundho Ingu Vandha Radhiye"	T. M. Soundararajan & (Radha) Jayalakshmi	Ka. Mu. Sheriff
"Sariyendru Nee Oru"	T. M. Soundararajan & (Radha) Jayalakshmi	Ka. Mu. Sheriff
"Kaithala Niraigani"	Gajalakshmi	Arunagirinathar
"Kaayaa Pazhama Sollunga"	A. P. Komala	Thanjai N. Ramaiah Dass
"Selathu Ravikkai Mele"	A. P. Komala & Guruvayur Ponnamma	A. Maruthakasi
"Ninaithale"	(Radha) Jayalakshmi	Ku. Sa. Krishnamoorthy
"Putham Pudhu"	(Radha) Jayalakshmi	Ku. Sa. Krishnamoorthy
"Mayangadha Kattazhagi"	Jayasakthivel	Ko. Ku.
"Aalamara Orathile"	M. K. Vijaya	Ko. Ku.
