= Khilona (1970 film) =

1970 Bollywood drama film

- Theatrical release poster from the movie
- Directed by: Chander Vohra
- Written by: Aghajani Kashmeri (dialogues)
- Screenplay by: Gulshan Nanda
- Story by: Gulshan Nanda
- Based on: Punarjanma (1963)
- Produced by: L. V. Prasad
- Starring: Sanjeev Kumar; Mumtaz; Shatrughan Sinha; Jeetendra
- Cinematography: Dwarka Divecha
- Edited by: Shivaji Awdhut
- Music by: Laxmikant–Pyarelal
- Production company: Prasad Productions Pvt. Ltd.
- Release date: 10 April 1970
- Running time: 160 minutes
- Country: India
- Language: Hindi
- Box office: ₹3,50,00,000

Khilona (transl. Toy) is a 1970 Indian Hindi-language drama film, produced by L. V. Prasad and directed by Chander Vohra. It stars Sanjeev Kumar, Mumtaz, Jeetendra in lead roles and music composed by Laxmikant–Pyarelal. The film is recorded as a "Super Hit" at Box Office India. The film was a remake of the Telugu film Punarjanma (1963) and it was simultaneously made in Tamil as Engirundho Vandhaal and in Malayalam as Amrithavaahini (1976).

The film received six nominations at the 18th Filmfare Awards in 1971, of which it won the Filmfare Best Movie Award and Filmfare Best Actress Award for Mumtaz. Other nominations were for Best Actor (Sanjeev Kumar), Best Comic (Jagdeep), Best Story (Gulshan Nanda) and Best Male Playback Singer (Mohammed Rafi).

== Plot ==
Vijaykamal is a son of rich Thakur Suraj Singh, but has lost his mind. He sees his lover Sapna marry his neighbor Bihari and then she commits suicide on the night of the Diwali party hosted by Bihari. This incident puts Vijay in shock. Thakur believes that if Vijay gets married, his mental health would improve. He hence approaches a tawaif, Chand to pretend to be Vijay's wife and thus help him get better. But Chand receives cold treatment from Vijay's mother and his elder brother Kishore. In a fit of madness, Vijay rapes Chand. But later, Chand becomes very friendly with Vijay and that starts improving his condition.

Bihari who wishes to have Chand for himself also tries to pursue Vijay's younger sister Radha. He promises Radha to make her an actress in Bollywood and asks her to elope with him with the family's money and gold. But Chand does not let Bihari's plan work. Vijay's younger brother Mohan also falls in love with noble Chand and is heartbroken when he finds out that she is pregnant (owing to the assault) with Vijay's child. Dejected, he leaves home without informing anyone.

In a fight between Vijay and Bihari, Bihari falls off the terrace and this shocks Vijay, curing him of his mental ailment. But then Vijay is unable to recall Chand. She is then humiliated by the family and is thrown out of the house. Mohan steps in and accuses everyone of treating her like a toy and only using her when needed. He reveals how she saved Radha from Bihari's evil pursuits. It is also revealed that Chand was actually born in a noble family and was only raised as a tawaif as she was found alone after a train accident. The family thus accepts Chand and all ends well.

== Cast ==
- Sanjeev Kumar as Vijaykamal Singh
- Mumtaz as Chand
- Jeetendra as Mohan Singh
- Shatrughan Sinha as Bihari
- Bipin Gupta as Thakur Suraj Singh
- Durga Khote as Thakurain Singh
- Ramesh Deo as Kishore Singh
- Chand Usmani as Laxmi Singh
- Jayshree T. as Radha Singh
- Jagdeep as Mahesh
- Malika as Shashibala
- Jankidas as Advocate Jankidas
- Satyen Kappu as Advocate
- Viju Khote as Johnson
- Mridula Rani as Hirabai
- Alka as Sapna

== Soundtrack ==
All the songs were composed by Laxmikant-Pyarelal and lyrics were penned by Anand Bakshi.

Song	Singer	Raga
"Rose Rose Rosy Tumko Pyar Karta Hai"	Kishore Kumar, Asha Bhosle	
"Sanam Tu Bewafa Ke"	Lata Mangeshkar	Kalavati
"Khush Rahe Tu Sadaa"	Mohammed Rafi	
"Khilona Jaankar Tum To"	Mohammed Rafi	Bhairavi (Hindustani)
"Main Sharaabi Nahin, Main Sharaabi Nahin"	Mohammed Rafi, Asha Bhosle	
"Yeh Naatak Kavi Likh Gaye"	Manna Dey	

== Awards ==
The film won two Filmfare Awards out of the six nominations it received.

- Best Movie
- Best Actress - Mumtaz

Other four nominations that it received were:

- Best Actor - Sanjeev Kumar
- Best Comedian - Jagdeep
- Best Story - Gulshan Nanda
- Best Male Playback Singer - Mohammed Rafi for the song "Khilona Jaankar Tum Kyu"
