= Desa Munnetram =

- Promotional poster
- Directed by: Mahindra
- Written by: N. R. Desai
- Produced by: Sarvotham Badhami
- Starring: Mathrimangalam Natesa Iyer; Baby Rukmini
- Music by: Papanasam Sivan
- Production company: Sagar Movietone
- Release date: 1938
- Country: India
- Language: Tamil

Desa Munnetram (transl. Development of the Nation) is a 1938 Indian Tamil-language film directed by Mahindra. Produced by Sarvotham Badhami, it stars Mathrimangalam Natesa Iyer and Baby Rukmini. The film, dealing with the issue of untouchability, opened to critical acclaim and was commercially successful. However, it is lost.

== Production ==
Desa Munnetram, a film dealing with the issue of untouchability, was directed by Mahindra and produced by Sarvotham Badhami for Sagar Movietone, a Bombay-based company. Mathirimangalam Natesa Iyer, a Carnatic musician, starred in the lead role of Murugan and Baby Rukmini played his eight-year-old daughter Madhavi. The story and screenplay were by N. R. Desai, while the dialogues were written by A. N. Kalyanasundaram.

== Soundtrack ==
Desa Munnetram's soundtrack was composed by Papanasam Sivan, and the lyrics were written by A. N. Kalyanasundaram. The song "Jaya Jaya Vandhe Matharam" attained a popularity for its patriotic theme.

== Reception ==
Desa Munnetram received critical acclaim and became a commercially successful venture. In 2011, film historian Randor Guy, writing for The Hindu, said the film would be "remembered for its thematic content, patriotic songs and the performances by Baby Rukmini and Natesa Iyer". No print of Desa Munnetram is known to survive, making it a lost film.
