= Sri Tirupatamma Katha =

- Theatrical release poster
- Directed by: B. S. Narayana
- Written by: Bollimunta Sivaramakrishna (dialogues)
- Screenplay by: B. S. Narayana
- Based on: Life of Tirupatamma
- Produced by: Donepoodi Krishna Murthy
- Starring: N. T. Rama Rao; Krishna Kumari
- Cinematography: K. Ramachandra Babu
- Edited by: G. D. Joshi; V. Anki Reddy
- Music by: Pamarthi
- Production company: Gokul Productions
- Release date: 4 October 1963
- Running time: 158 mins
- Country: India
- Language: Telugu

Sri Tirupatamma Katha (transl. Story of Tirupatamma) is a 1963 Indian Telugu-language biographical film, based on the life of Penuganchiprolu Tirupatamma, produced by Donepoodi Krishna Murthy under the Gokul Productions banner and directed by B. S. Narayana. It stars N. T. Rama Rao, and Krishna Kumari, and features music composed by Pamarthi.

== Cast ==
- N. T. Rama Rao as Gopalanna
- Krishna Kumari as Tirupatamma
- Gummadi as Mallaiah
- Mikkilineni as Subbaiah
- Ramana Reddy as Joogulu
- Satyanarayana
- Ramakrishna as Lord Venkateswara
- Vangara as Priest
- Chadalavada as Shankaraiah
- Suryakantham as Venkamma
- Chaya Devi as Lokamma
- Rajasulochana as Padmavathi
- Hemalatha as Chandramma
- Surabhi Balasaraswathi as Kaamulu

== Soundtrack ==
Sri Tirupatamma Katha

Film score by Pamarthi
- Released: 1963
- Genre: Soundtrack
- Producer: Pamarthi

The soundtrack was composed by Pamarthi.

S. No.	Song title	Lyrics	Singers	length
1	"Sri Venkatesa"	Bollimunta Sivaramakrishna	P. Leela	3:47
2	"Poovai Virisina"	C. Narayana Reddy	Ghantasala	3:23
3	"Chilakalanchu Cheeradana"	Sivaramaiah	Pithapuram, Jikki	
4	"Kougili Kailasamu"	Dasaradhi	P. Leela	2:49
5	"Ee Chiru Navvulalo"	C. Narayana Reddy	Ghantasala, P. Susheela	3:40
6	"Poovai Virisina" (F)	C. Narayana Reddy	P. Leela	3:06
7	"Po Pora Mamayah"	Sivaramaiah	Madhavapeddi Satyam, K. Rani	3:34
8	"Aadamule Natakam"	Sivaramaiah	Pithapuram, Jikki	
