= Sri Valli (1945 film) =

- Theatrical release poster
- Directed by: A. V. Meiyappan; A. T. Krishnaswamy
- Screenplay by: A. T. Krishnaswamy
- Produced by: A. V. Meiyappan
- Starring: T. R. Mahalingam; Kumari Rukmani
- Cinematography: P. V. Krishna Iyer
- Edited by: M. V. Raman; M. K. Ramani
- Music by: T. M. Rajagopal Sharma; R. Sudarsanam
- Production company: Pragathi Studios
- Release date: 13 April 1945
- Running time: 114 minutes
- Country: India
- Language: Tamil

Sri Valli is a 1945 Indian Tamil-language film co-directed by A. V. Meiyappan and produced by him under Pragathi Studios. It was co-directed by A. T. Krishnaswamy who also wrote the script. The film stars T. R. Mahalingam and Kumari Rukmani.

Sri Valli was the first Tamil film to introduce playback singing for the first time through lip synchronization, and the first film in which the dialogues were released in Gramaphone records. T. M. Rajagopal Sharma and R. Sudarsanam respectively composed the film's music and P. V. Krishna Iyer served as the cinematographer. The film was edited by the duo M. V. Raman, while V. M. Vatturkar and S. Ammaiyappan were the film's art directors.

Sri Valli was released on 13 April 1945 with a final reel length of 3,325 metres (10,909 ft). Upon release, Sri Valli received critical acclaim and went on to become a commercially successful venture at box office. It is considered to be a breakthrough film for both T. R. Mahalingam and Kumari Rukmini.

== Plot ==
Sri Valli is a mythological story based on the life of Valli, the consort of Lord Murugan. Valli is a tribal princess who fell in love with Lord Murugan, but due to her tribal traditions, she was arranged to marry someone else. However, Valli's devotion towards Lord Murugan helped her overcome all obstacles, and she eventually married him.

== Cast ==
- T. R. Mahalingam as Velan, Hunter, Old Man
- Kumari Rukmani as Valli
- Baby Kamala as Young Valli, Young Subramanyam
- K. Mahadevan as Naradar
- T. R. Ramachandran as Killi
- G. Sowdamini as Melli
- S. Kuppusami Iyengar as Nambirajan
- K. Nagalakshmi as Mohini
- N. S. Krishnan as Athan
- T. A. Mathuram as Subbamma

== Production ==
After releasing the Tamil dubbed version of Kannada film Satya Harischandra (1943), A. V. Meiyappan decided to direct a film based on the folk tale of Valli. A. T. Krishnaswamy who co-directed the film wrote the script. Prior to the commencement of shooting, Meiyappan and his wife visited key Lord Murugan temples to seek forgiveness if by oversight makes any mistakes in any of the scenes from the film. The film was made on a budget of ₹2 lakh (worth ₹15 crore in 2021 prices) and returned 900 per cent on investment for AVM.

Initially Meiyappan had Thyagaraja Bagavathar in mind for the lead role. T. R. Mahalingam who earlier acted as child artist in Meiyappan's Nandakumar (1938) was signed on for the lead role and also as a part of contract that he should not act in any film or play until the completion of the film. For the titular character, Vasundhara Devi was initially considered and she insisted on selecting the lead actor for herself. After many names were suggested, she rejected them all and opted out. Kumari Rukmini who earlier appeared as child artist in films like Balayogini (1937) was signed as Meiyappan felt that her eyes will be a big attraction. T. R. Ramachandran, N. S. Krishnan and T. A. Mathuram were selected to appear in supporting roles.

The film was shot at the Pragathi Studio and the outdoor scenes were picturised in and around Adyar, including the Theosophical Society premises. The four-year old elephant was brought from Trichur for one of the characters. Sami Iyer who owned the elephant refused to take any money and allowed the elephant to act in the film. After completing the film, Meiyappan saw the first copy and was satisfied with the songs sung by Mahalingam, but was not satisfied with the singing of Rukmini in songs. Meiyappan decided to record the voice of P.A. Periyanayaki in place of Rukmini. It was recorded by sound engineer V. S. Raghavan through post synchronisation method. Kumari Rukmini did not accept the voice of Periyanayaki for her as she felt that the film came out well, she insisted on cancelling the three film agreement which she had signed as part of compensation. AVM who was keen on receiving success cancelled the agreement. The final length of the film was 3,325 metres (10,909 ft).

== Themes and influences ==
The original story was based on a folk tale which describes the romance between Lord Muruga and Valli, a tribal girl. Initially exhibited as stage plays, the story was developed into a silent film titled Valli Thirumanam in 1921. It was followed by another silent release, Sri Subramanyam in 1930. N. D. Sarpotdhar remade the film the same year for the "Aryan Film Company" and named it as Subramaniam. Another version titled Valli Kalyanam released the same year where Sundar Rao Nadkarni enacted the lead role.

The first talkie version of the story was produced by Samikannu Vincent in 1933. Named Valli Thirumanam, the film was shot in Calcutta and directed by P. V. Rao. T. P. Rajalakshmi played the role of Valli in the which ultimately became a box-office success. Sixteen years later after the 1945 film, a colour Sri Valli (1961 film) based on the same story was produced by Narasu Studios. It had Sivaji Ganesan and Padmini as the lead pair. T. R. Mahalingam who played Muruga in the previous version was given the role of Narada in this film.

== Soundtrack ==
The music was composed by TR Rajagopal Sharma and R Sudarsanam respectively while lyrics were written by Papanasam Sivan and Raja Gopal Iyer. All the songs well received especially "Vanna thamaraiyai kandu" and "Kaayatha Kaanagathe". The song "Kaayatha Kaanagathe" is based on Bhairavi raga, while "Ellorayum Pole" is based on Shuddha Saveri.

Track listing
No.	Title	Length
1.	"Kaayatha Kaanagathe"
2.	"Yaar Undhanai"
3.	"Konjum Kili"
4.	"Mayile Thoodhu"
5.	"Singaravela"

== Release ==
The film was released on 13 April 1945. During the re-release of the film, Meiyappan replaced the vocals of Periyanayaki in place of Rukmini and included it in new set of prints. The film ran for 55 weeks in Central Theatre, Madurai. In his book Pride of Tamil Cinema, G. Dhananjayan stated that the film's success was "largely boosted by TR Mahalingam and Periyanayaki's excellent songs". Randor Guy wrote for The Hindu that the film was remembered for "the melodious music and hit songs of Mahalingam and Periyanayaki".

== Legacy ==
Sri Valli is remembered for the first Tamil film to use playback singing through post synchronisation as the original audio of the songs erased and being replaced with different audio. It also became the first Tamil film for which the dialogues of the film being released in Gramaphone records. The film became a breakthrough for the lead pair Mahalingam and Rukmini and playback singer Periyanayaki.

== Bibliography ==
- Dhananjayan, G. (2014). Pride of Tamil Cinema: 1931–2013. Blue Ocean Publishers. OCLC 898765509.
