= Chitti Chellelu =

- Theatrical release poster
- Directed by: M. Krishnan Nair
- Written by: D. V. Narasa Raju (dialogues)
- Screenplay by: V. C. Guhanathan
- Story by: V. C. Guhanathan
- Produced by: M. Murugan; M. Saravanan; M. Kumaran; M. Balasubramanian; M. S. Guhan
- Starring: N. T. Rama Rao; Vanisri; Rajasree
- Cinematography: Tambu; K. S. Bhaskar Rao
- Edited by: R. Vital
- Music by: S. Rajeswara Rao
- Production company: AVM Productions
- Release date: 29 July 1970
- Running time: 169 minutes
- Country: India
- Language: Telugu

Chitti Chellelu (transl. Little Sister) is a 1970 Indian Telugu-language drama film, directed by M. Krishnan Nair and produced by AVM Productions. It stars N. T. Rama Rao, Vanisri and Rajasree, with music composed by S. Rajeswara Rao.

== Cast ==
- N. T. Rama Rao as Raja
- Vanisri as Santha
- Rajasree as Janaki
- Haranath as Raghu
- Relangi as Sivalingam's father
- Gummadi as Raghavayya
- Padmanabham as Sivalingam
- Balakrishna as Sanyasi
- Geetanjali as Geeta
- Surabhi Balasaraswathi as Balamma
- Nirmalamma as Subbamma

== Soundtrack ==
The music was composed by S. Rajeswara Rao. The song "Ee Reyi Theyanadi" is based on the French song "L'amour est bleu".

Track listing
No.	Title	Lyrics	Singer(s)	Length
1.	"Andala Pasi Papa"	Dasaradhi	P. Susheela	3:50
2.	"Ee Reyi Theeyanadi"	C. Narayana Reddy	S. P. Balasubrahmanyam, P. Susheela	4:03
3.	"Jum Jum Thummeda"	Dasaradhi	Ghantasala, P. Susheela	2:48
4.	"One Two Three"	Kosaraju	L. R. Eswari	3:26
5.	"Mangala Gowri"	Aarudhra	P. Susheela	2:57
6.	"Andala Pasi Papa" (2)	Dasaradhi	P. Susheela	3:55
7.	"Andala Pasi Papa" (Sad)	Dasaradhi	Ghantasala	1:42
