= Nimajjanam =

- Directed by: B. S. Narayana
- Starring: Sarada; Chakrapani; Bose Babu; M. V. Rama Rao; Dasarathi
- Cinematography: P. S. Nivas
- Edited by: B. Kuppuswamy
- Music by: M. B. Sreenivasan
- Distributed by: Red Rose Art Films
- Release date: 1979
- Country: India
- Language: Telugu

Nimajjanam (English title: The Immersion) is a 1979 Telugu film directed by B. S. Narayana, produced by Prem Prakash, starring Sarada and Chakrapani, with cinematography by P. S. Nivas. The film premiered at the 1980 International Film Festival of India. It was one of the Indian entries at the Warsaw-Poland Film Festival held in June 1980.

== Plot ==
The story is about a Brahmin housewife who has to go to her in-laws' house after her father-in-law dies. She and her husband take a bullock cart to immerse her father-in-law's ashes in holy water, which is the traditional Hindu custom Nimajjanam. During the journey, the cart driver starts to lust after her and eventually rapes her. Traumatized by the rape, she drowns herself in the holy water and the remorseful driver confesses his crime.

== Awards ==
- National Film Award for Best Feature Film in Telugu
- Sharada won the National Film Award for Best Actress in 1979.
- P. S. Nivas won Nandi Award for Best Cinematographer (1979)
