= Rajakota Rahasyam =

- Theatrical release poster
- Directed by: B. Vittalacharya
- Written by: Pingali
- Produced by: M. K. Gangaraju
- Starring: N. T. Rama Rao; Devika
- Cinematography: G. K. Ramu
- Edited by: K. Govinda Swamy
- Music by: Vijaya Krishna Murthy
- Production company: G. R. Productions
- Release date: 12 March 1971
- Running time: 172 mins
- Country: India
- Language: Telugu

Rajakota Rahasyam (transl. Secret of the King's Fort) is a 1971 Indian Telugu-language historical fantasy film directed by B. Vittalacharya. It stars N. T. Rama Rao, Devika with music composed by Vijaya Krishna Murthy. The film was produced by M. K. Gangaraju under the G. R. Productions banner. It was released on 12 March 1971.

== Cast ==
- N. T. Rama Rao as Vijay
- Devika as Kanchana
- Satyanarayana as Simhananda
- V. Nagayya
- Mikkilineni as Ananda Bhupathi
- Dhulipala as Mahendra Varma
- Mukkamala as Govardhan Marharshi
- Ramana Reddy
- Balakrishna as Madana
- Chaya Devi as Tankai Venkayamma
- Jyothi Lakshmi as Kamini
- Meena Kumari as Madhavi
- Pushpa Kumari

== Soundtrack ==
Music composed by Vijaya Krishna Murthy.

Song title	Lyrics	Singers	length
"Ee Nela Bangaaru Nela"	C. Narayana Reddy	P. Susheela	3:49
"Karuninchavaa"	C. Narayana Reddy	Ghantasala	3:15
"Naa Vallo Chikkina"	Kosaraju	L. R. Eswari	2:42
"Aliveni Nee Ropamu"	C. Narayana Reddy	Ghantasala	1:23
"Nanu Maruvani"	C. Narayana Reddy	Ghantasala, P. Susheela	3:39
"Nelavanka Thongi Choosindhi"	C. Narayana Reddy	Ghantasala, P. Susheela	2:58
"Rojakokka Mojuga"	Pingali Nagendra Rao	L.R.Eswari	3:05
"Neevu Naaku Raajaa"	Pingali Nagendra Rao	L. R. Eswari	3:59
"Kannavaari"	C. Narayana Reddy	Ghantasala	3:29
"Eeswari"	Pingali Nagendra Rao	Ghantasala	6:05
