= Nil Gavani Kadhali =

- Poster
- Directed by: C. V. Rajendran
- Written by: Chithralaya Gopu
- Starring: Jaishankar; Bharathi
- Cinematography: P. N. Sundaram
- Edited by: N. M. Shankar
- Music by: M. S. Viswanathan
- Production company: Reena Films
- Release date: 7 March 1969
- Running time: 120 minutes
- Country: India
- Language: Tamil

Nil Gavani Kaadhali (transl. Stop, Look, and Love) is a 1969 Indian Tamil-language crime thriller film, directed by C. V. Rajendran and written by Chithralaya Gopu. The film stars Jaishankar, Bharathi, Nagesh, Jayanthi and Vijaya Lalitha. It was released on 7 March 1969, and fared well at the box office.

== Plot ==
A gang of diamond smugglers led by a wily chief is assisted by Babu. His niece Malathy meets the CID officer Shankar and hands over a packet at an airport lounge to be handed over to her uncle. Her elder sister Radha meets the pal Seetha Raman and falls in love with him. The two pairs go through several adventures and expose the villains.

== Cast ==
- Jaishankar as CID Shankar
- Bharathi as Malathy
- Nagesh as Seetharaman
- Jayanthi as Radha
- Vijaya Lalitha as Sheela
- M. N. Nambiar as gang leader
- Major Sundarrajan as Babu
- Senthamarai
- Dhanaraj
- Henry Daniel
- Varadachari
- V. R. Thilakam as Myna
- Malathi

== Production ==
A fight sequence was shot in a set built to show Nambiar's den at Vijaya Vauhini Studios.

== Soundtrack ==
Music was composed by M. S. Viswanathan and lyrics were written by Vaali.

Song	Singer	Length
"Come Come Rosy"	P. B. Srinivas, L. R. Eswari	3:10
"Engeyo Paartha Mugam"	P. B. Srinivas, L. R. Eswari	3:25
"Kangalukkenna Kaval"	L. R. Eswari	3:37
"Jilendra Kaatru"	T. M. Soundararajan P. Susheela	3:42
"Rajakutty"	T. M. Soundararajan P. Susheela	
