= Rani Mera Naam =

Rani Mera Nam
- Poster
- Directed by: K. S. R. Das
- Written by: Raj Baldev Raj
- Produced by: R.N. Venkateswarlu; B. Sushila Devi
- Starring: Vijayalalitha; Premnath; Ajit
- Edited by: K. S. R. Das
- Music by: R. D. Burman
- Release date: 1972
- Country: India
- Language: Hindi

Rani Mera Nam (transl. Rani is my name) is a 1972 Indian Hindi-language masala film directed by K. S. R. Das. The film stars Vijayalalitha in the lead role. Premnath, Ajit, Madan Puri are in supporting roles. Vinod Mehra, Ashok Kumar and Om Prakash made special appearances. It is also Sridevi's Hindi debut film as a child artist. It is a remake of the 1970 Telugu film Rowdy Rani.

== Cast ==
- Vijayalalitha as Rani
- Premnath as John
- Ajit as Amritlal
- Madan Puri as Dayaram
- Anwar Hussain as Zalim Singh
- Iftekhar as Mangal
- Jagdeep
- Vinod Mehra as CID Inspector Anand (Special Appearance)
- Ashok Kumar as IG (Special Appearance)
- Om Prakash as Dhaniram (Special Appearance)
- Sridevi as Young Rani

== Soundtrack ==
Song	Singer
"Andhera Andhera"	Asha Bhosle
"Tum Bhi Jhuthe"	Asha Bhosle
"Lap Jhap Kahan Jate Ho Jani"	Asha Bhosle
"Sare Jag Se Achha Apna Pyara Hindustan"	Asha Bhosle, Manna Dey
