= Navvite Navaratnalu =

- Poster
- Directed by: S. Soundararajan
- Produced by: S. Soundararajan
- Starring: Krishna Kumari; Ramasarma
- Music by: Aswathama Gudimetla; G. Ramanathan
- Production company: Tamil Nadu Talkies
- Release date: 1951
- Country: India
- Language: Telugu

Navvite Navaratnalu is a 1951 Indian Telugu-language fantasy film produced and directed by S. Soundararajan starring Krishna Kumari and Ramasarma.

== Plot ==
Gowri, from a farmer family, is treated cruelly by her stepmother Ganga and her sister Chandra. However, Gowri falls into a well one day, and her angelic mother saves her and gives her the power that whenever she smiles, she would receive nine gems. Rangayya, her father, becomes a rich merchant. King Rajasekhar invites the family for a function at the palace. Hoping that Rajasekhar would marry her, Ganga locks up Gowri in a room and takes her sister Chandra with her. The angelic mother frees Gowri, who goes to the function. Rajasekhar is fascinated by Gowri’s beauty and decides to marry her, but Ganga plays some tricks. What happens next forms the rest of the story.

== Cast ==
- Krishna Kumari as Gowri
- Ramasarma as King Rajasekhar
- Nirmala Devi
- Bhudevi
- Mohan
- Vangara Venkata Subbaiah
- Addala Narayana Rao
- Gummadi
- Seetha
- Lalitha
- Padmini

== Production ==
Navvite Navaratnalu marks the lead debut of Krishna Kumari. She was spotted by Soundararajan's daughter, N. Ye. Bhuma, at the former Rajakumari theatre in Pondy Bazaar, Madras while she was watching Swapna Sundari. Soundararajan cast Ramasarma despite the box office failure of their previous film together, Adrushta Deepudu. The film was ghost directed by Bhuma.

== Soundtrack ==
The music was composed by Aswathama Gudimetla and G. Ramanathan.

- "Telirekhalu Virise" - M. L. Vasantha Kumari
- "Uyyala Loogenaho Maanasamu" - M. L. Vasantha Kumari

== Release and reception ==
Navvite Navaratnalu was screened at Vani Mahal, Madras. The film ran to full houses during its first week in a few centres in places like Vijayawada due to Krishna Kumari. However, the film was a box office failure due to its insipid story and poor direction. Soundararajan did not lose any money through the film.
