= Irugu Porugu =

- Theatrical release poster
- Directed by: I. N. Murthy
- Screenplay by: I. N. Murthy
- Story by: Sailajananda Mukherjee
- Based on: Ami Baro Hobo (1957)
- Produced by: Chilamkurthi Vijaya Saradhi
- Starring: N. T. Rama Rao; Krishna Kumari
- Cinematography: Malli Irani
- Edited by: M. S. Mani
- Music by: Master Venu
- Production company: Kalaprapurna Theatres
- Release date: 11 January 1963
- Running time: 133 minutes
- Country: India
- Language: Telugu

Irugu Porugu (transl. Neighbours) is a 1963 Indian Telugu-language comedy film directed by I. N. Murthy and produced by Chilamkurthi Vijaya Saradhi. The film stars N. T. Rama Rao and Krishna Kumari. A remake of the Bengali film Ami Baro Hobo (1957), it was released on 11 January 1963.

== Cast ==
- N. T. Rama Rao as Ravi
- Krishna Kumari as Chitra / Jikki
- Relangi as Vinod Babu
- Gummadi as Viswanatham
- V. Nagayya as Sundaram
- M. Balayya as Ramu / Johnny
- C. S. R. as Parandhamayya
- Mikkilineni
- Sobhan Babu as Prasad
- Allu Ramalingaiah
- Balakrishna as Anji
- Sowcar Janaki as Kanchala Mala
- Sandhya as Charulatha
- Girija as Jayanthi
- E. V. Saroja as Dancer
- L. Vijayalakshmi as Dancer
- Nirmalamma as Saraswathi

== Music ==
The music was composed by Master Venu.

Song title	Lyrics	Singers	length
"Naa Manasantaa Teesuko"	Aarudhra	Jikki	4:05
"Mundu Chupputho"	Kosaraju	L. R. Eswari	4:21
"Jigi Jigelumani"	Aarudhra	P. B. Srinivas, S. Janaki	3:13
"Mabbula Chaatuna"	Aarudhra	Jikki	2:33
"Kavvinchevu Kavvinchevu"	Kosaraju	Madhavapeddi Satyam, Swarnalatha	3:18
"Sannajaji Chelimi Kori"	Aarudhra	P. B. Srinivas, S. Janaki	3:12
"Nrutya Rupakam"	Kosarju	P. B. Srinivas, S. Janaki	5:37
"Yetu Choosina"	Aarudhra	Jikki	3:33

== Release and reception ==
Irugu Porugu premiered on 5 January 1963 at Vijaya Gardens, Madras for press and film industry people. It was dedicated to Bellary Raghava, a legend of Telugu theatre. The film was released on 11 January 1963. D. K. M. of Andhra Patrika reviewed the film positively commending the writing, direction, music, and the performances of the cast especially C. S. R. Anjaneyulu. Venkat Rao of Andhra Jyothi called Irugu Porugu an entertaining film and noted C. S. R. Anjaneyulu's performance as the highlight of the film and as his career best. He also praised the dialogues of Kondepudi and the direction of I. N. Murthy.
