= Kumari Rukmani =

Indian actress and dancer

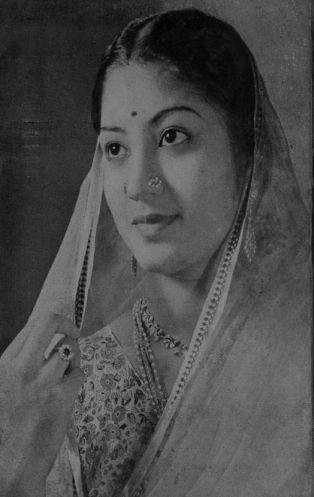
- Rukmani in the 1940s
- Born: 19 April 1929
- Died: 4 September 2007 (aged 78); Chennai, Tamil Nadu, India
- Occupation: Actor
- Years active: 1935–2000
- Spouse: Y. V. Rao
- Children: Lakshmi
- Parent: Nungambakkam Janaki
- Relatives: Aishwariyaa Bhaskaran (granddaughter)

Kumari Rukmani (19 April 1929 – 4 September 2007), also known as Kumari Rukmini, was an Indian actress and dancer. She has acted in about 100 films in Tamil, Telugu and Hindi languages.

== Childhood ==
She is the daughter of Nungambakkam Janaki, also an actress. She hails from Melattur in Thanjavur district. During the shooting of Harishchandra (1932) in Bombay (now Mumbai) the producers were looking for a young actor to feature as Lohidasan. Kumari Rukmani, as a child, was staying with her parents in the next room where T. P. Rajalakshmi who was the female lead in the film, was staying. Rajalakshmi recommended Kumari Rukmani to the producers. The producers talked to the parents and made Kumari Rukmani to feature as Lohidasan in the film. Thus began her film career.

== Film career ==
Rukmani in 1945 film Sri Valli

She featured in many films together with T. P. Rajalakshmi. Her first film as heroine was Sri Valli in which she acted as Valli paired with T. R. Mahalingam. In 1946 she featured in Lavangi paired with the multi-talented Y. V. Rao. While the shooting of this film was going on both she and Rao fell in love with each other and later got married. Cine actress Lakshmi is their daughter.

== Partial filmography ==
Year	Title	Role	Notes
1935	Harichandra	Lohidasan	Child Artist
1937	Chintamani		Child Artist
1937	Balayogini		Child Artist
1938	Desa Munnetram		Child Artist
1941	Rishyasringar		Child Artist
1945	Sri Valli	Goddess Valli	
1946	Lavangi	Jagannatha Pandita Rayalu's wife	
1947	Pankajavalli	Lord Krishna	
1948	Ramadas		
1955	Mullaivanam		
1961	Kappalotiya Thamizhan	Meenakshi Ammal	V. O. Chidambaram Pillai's wife
1961	Sri Valli		
1963	Mani Osai		
1963	Idhayathil Nee		
1963	Kadavulai Kanden		
1963	Paar Magaleya Paar	Sekar Mother	
1964	Poompuhar	Govalan Mother	
1964	Karnan	Radha Karnan Step Mother	
1964	Navarathri	Ananth Mother	
1965	Vennira Aadai	Seetha	
1965	Idhayak Kamalam	Baskar Mother	
1966	Thedi Vantha Thirumagal		
1970	Vilaiyaattu Pillai		
1970	Thalaivan	Manimegalai	
1970	Mayani Mamata		Telugu film
1971	Avalukendru Or Manam	Rajam	
1971	Irulum Oliyum		
1971	Moondrudeivangal		
1973	Karaikkal Ammaiyar	Dharmavathi	Punithavathi's mother
1976	Rojavin Raja	Visalam	
1978	Ennai Pol Oruvan	Sekar Mother	
2000	Kandukondain Kandukondain	Sivagnanam's mother	

== Producer ==
She produced two films in Hindi: Lavangi and Manjari.

== Death ==
After ailing for some time, Kumari Rukmani died on 4 September 2007 at her daughter actress Lakshmi's residence in Chennai.

== K. T. Rukmini ==
There was another actress/singer named K. T. Rukmini during 1930/40s. She was featured in films like Menaka (1935), Thirumangai Alwar (1940) and her last film was Ponnuruvi (1947).
