= Sri Sri (writer) =

Telugu poet and lyricist (1910–1983)

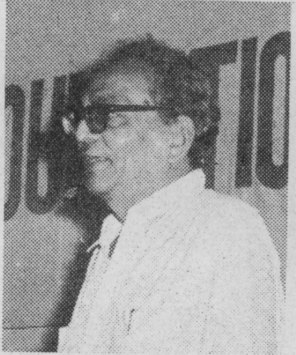
- Sri Sri
- Born: Srirangam Srinivasa Rao; 30 April 1910; Visakhapatnam, Madras Presidency, British India (present-day Andhra, India)
- Died: 15 June 1983 (aged 73); Madras, Tamil Nadu, India
- Spouse(s): Venkata Ramanamma, Saroja

Srirangam Srinivasa Rao (30 April 1910 – 15 June 1983), popularly known as Sri Sri, was an Indian poet and lyricist who is known for his works in Telugu literature and films. Noted for his anthology Maha Prasthanam, Sri Sri is a recipient of a National Film Award, a Nandi Award and a Sahitya Akademi Award.

He was a member of Pen India, Sahitya Academy, vice-president of the South Indian Film Writers Association, Madras and president of the Revolutionary Writers Association of Andhra.

== Life ==
Srirangam Srinivasa Rao, popularly known as Sri Sri, was born into a Telugu speaking family on 30 April 1910 in Visakhapatnam of present-day Andhra Pradesh. His parents were Pudipeddi Venkatramaniah and Atappakonda but was later adopted by Srirangam Suryanarayana. Sri Sri was schooled at Vishakhapatnam and graduated in BA hons at Madras christian college in 1931. He started as a demonstrator at SVS College, Vizag in 1935 and joined as sub-editor at the daily, Andhra Prabha in 1938. He later worked at Delhi Akashavani, The State of Hyderabad, and the daily Andhra Vani, in various positions. He later married Sarojini, with whom he had a son and three daughters, whose names were Mala Srinivasarao, Venkat Srinivasarao, Manjula Srinivasarao, Mangala Srinivasarao. One of his daughter is serving as a Judge of Madras High Court.

== Literary career ==
Srirangam Srinivasa Rao was the first true modern Telugu poet to write about contemporary issues that affected the day-to-day life of a common man in a style and metre which were not used in classical Telugu poetry. He moved poetry forward from traditional mythological themes to reflect more contemporary issues. The essence of his personality was captured by Gudipati Venkatachalam when he compared him with the great romantic Telugu poet Devulapalli Krishnasastri: “While Krishna Sastry made his anguish known to the whole world, Sri Sri spoke in his voice about the anguish of the whole world. Krishna Sastry's pain was the pain of the world, while the world's pain became Sri Sri's pain.” His book Maha Prasthanam (The Great Journey), an anthology of poems, is one of his major works. In one of the poems, "Jagannathuni Ratha Chakralu", Sri Sri addressed those who were suffering due to social injustices and said, "Don't cry, don't cry. The wheels of the chariot of Jagannath are coming; they are coming! The apocalyptic chant of the chariot wheels! Come, realize your dreams Rule your new world!" "Other major works include Siprali and Khadga Srushti ("Creation of the Sword").

== Telugu cinema ==
He entered into Telugu cinema with Ahuti (1950), a Telugu-dubbed version of Junnarkar's Neera aur Nanda (1946). Some of the songs, such as "Hamsavale O Padava", "Oogisaladenayya", "Premaye jannana marana leela", scored by Saluri Rajeswara Rao, were major hits. Sri Sri was a screenwriter for several Telugu films. He was one of the best film songwriters in India, he has penned lyrics for over 1000 soundtracks in Telugu. He was a great asset to the Telugu film industry.

== Literary style ==
He is a major radical poet (e.g. Prabhava) and novelist (e.g. Veerasimha Vijayasimhulu). He introduced free verse into his socially concerned poetry through Maha Prasthanam. He wrote visionary poems in a style and metre not used before in Telugu classical poetry.

According to Viplava Rachayitala Sangham leader G. Kalyan Rao, Sri Sri was a scientist, a thinker and a philosopher. Maoist ideologue and writer Varavara Rao opined that Sri Sri not only wrote poetry but also practiced what he said.

== Work for human rights ==
Sri Sri was the first President of Andhra Pradesh Civil Liberties Committee that was formed in 1974.

== Awards and recognitions ==
=== National honours ===
- Sahithya Academy Award – 1972
- Soviet Land Nehru Award

=== Film awards ===
- National Film Award for Best Lyrics – Alluri Seetarama Raju for "Telugu Veera Levara" – 1974
- Nandi Award for Best Lyricist – Neti Bharatam – "Ardha Raatri Swatantram Andhakara Bandhuram" – 1983

=== Other honours ===
- Raja-Lakshmi Award in 1979 by Sri Raja-Lakshmi Foundation in Chennai

== Bibliography ==
- Prabhava (1928)
- Vaaram Vaaram (1946)
- Sampangi Thota (1947)
- Maha Prasthanam (1950)
- Amma (1952)
- Meemee (1954)
- Maro Prapancham (1956)
- Three Cheers for Man (1956)
- Charama Raathri (1957)
- Maanavudi Paatlu (1958)
- Sowdamini
- Gurajada (1959)
- Moodu Yebhailu (1964)
- Khadga Srushti (1966)
- Views and Reviews (1969)
- Sri Sri Sahityam (5 volumes) (1970)
- Sri Sri's Minnelani (1970)
- Rekka Vippina Revolution (1971)
- Vyasa Kreedalu (1973)
- Maro Moodu Yabhailu (1974)
- China Yaanam (1980)
- Maro Prasthanam (1980)
- Mahaa Prasthanam (1981)
- Paadavoyi Bharateeyuda (1983)
- New Frontiers (1983)
- Anantam
- Pra-Ja

== Filmography ==
Year	Film	Song
1956	Ilavelupu	Challani raja... O chandamama(చల్లని రాజా... ఓ చందమామా)
1958	Mangalya Balam	Vadina pule vikasinchene (వాడిన పూలే వికసించెనే)
1959	Jayabheri	nanduni charitamu vinuma
1959	Sabhash Ramudu	jayammu nischayammura
1961	Bharya Bharthalu	joruga husharuga
1961	Iddaru Mitrulu	padavela radhika..
1961	Vagdanam	Sri Nagaja Tanayam
1961	Velugu Needalu	Padavoyi Bharateeyudaa (పాడవోయి భారతీయుడా); Kala kaanidi viluvainadi (కలకానిది విలువైనది); O.. rangayyo pula rangayyo
1962	Aradhana	na hrudayamlo nidurinche chelee..
1963	Nartanasala	evvari kosam ee mandahasam
1963	Punarjanma	evarivo.. neevevarivo
1963	Paruvu Pratishta	A mabbu terala lona daagundi (sad)
1964	Dr. Chakravarthi	manasuna manasai
1964	Gudi Gantalu	neelona nanne nilipevu nede
1964	Bobbili Yuddham	muripinche andhaale
1964	Manchi Manishi	rananukunnavemo
1964	Sabhash Suri	devudiki emi
1965	Preminchi Chudu	dorikaaru doragaaru..
1966	Atma Gouravam	valapulu virisina puvvule
1969	Atmeeyulu	kallalo pelli pandiri
1969	Manushulu Marali	turupu sindhurapu..
1972	Kalam Marindi	mara ledule ee kalam
1973	Devudu Chesina Manushulu	Devudu Chesina Manushulara
1973	Desoddharakulu	madi madi.. suchi suchi
1974	Alluri Seetharama Raju	Telugu veera levara (National Award Winning Song)
1974	Bhoomi Kosam	evaro vastarani
1975	Balipeetam	kalasi padudaam
1975	Devudu Lanti Manishi	kandalu
1976	Kolleti Kapuram	iddarame
1976	Paadi Pantalu	pani chese raitanna
1976	Ramarajyamlo Raktapatam	ivvala randi
1977	Prema Lekhalu	ee roju
1977	Oorummadi Brathukulu	Sramaika Jeevana Soundaryaniki Samanamainadi Lene Ledoyi
1977	Yamagola	samaraniki nede prarambham
1977	Edureetha	Edureethaku antham leda?
1978	Karunamayudu	devudu ledani anakunda
1979	Gorintaku	ilaga vachhi
1979	Kaliyuga Mahabharatam	ee samaram
1980	Ammayiki Mogudu Mamaki Yamudu	chudara.. Telugu sodara
1980	Sardar Papa Rayudu	burrakatha on Alluri Seetharama Raju
1981	Aakali Rajyam	Oo Mahatma
1982	Eenadu	randi kadali randi
1982	Manchu Pallaki	manishe manideepam
1982	Viplava Sankham	Muyinchina oka veeruni kanthamm, Kontamandi Kurravallu
1983	Neti Bharatam	ardha ratri swatantram
1984	Maha Prasthanam	maro prapancham pilichindi
