= Leta Manasulu (1966 film) =

- Theatrical release poster
- Directed by: Krishnan–Panju
- Produced by: A. V. Meiyappan
- Starring: Haranath; Jamuna; Kutty Padmini
- Music by: M. S. Viswanathan
- Production company: AVM Productions
- Release date: 16 September 1966
- Country: India
- Language: Telugu

Leta Manasulu (transl. Tender Hearts) is a 1966 Indian Telugu-language film directed by Krishnan–Panju and produced by A. V. Meiyappan under AVM Productions banner. The film stars Haranath, Jamuna and Kutty Padmini. It is a remake of the 1965 Tamil film Kuzhandaiyum Deivamum which itself was an adaptation of the 1961 film The Parent Trap, in turn based on Erich Kästner's 1949 German novel Lisa and Lottie (German: Das doppelte Lottchen). The film was released on 16 September 1966.

== Plot ==
Satyabhama and Shekhar's love withstands the test of time. They end up getting married, and together they have identical twins. A family feud separates the twins, but destiny brings them back together. The twins find out they are siblings and agree to switch places. Twins Padmini "Puppy" and Lalitha "Lalli" decide to reunite their separated parents.

== Cast ==
- Haranath as Chandrasekhar "Sekhar"
- Jamuna as Satyabhama "Bhama"
- Kutty Padmini as Padmini "Puppy" and Lalitha "Lalli" (Dual role)
- Relangi as Shambhulingam
- Padmanabham as Sundaram
- Jagga Rao as Jambu
- G. Varalakshmi as Kanaka Durgamma
- Geethanjali as Nirmala
- Manimala as Janaki
- Kanakam as Jalajamma

== Soundtrack ==
All songs composed by M. S. Viswanathan.

- "Andaala Ee Reyi" -
- "Andaala O Chilaka" -
- "Andaala O Chilaka" (Sad) -
- "Hello Madam Satyabhama"-
- "Kodi Oka Konalo"-
- "Makkuva Teerchava"-
- "Pillalu Devudu Challanivaare"-
