= Vijaya Lalitha =

Indian actress

Vijayalalitha
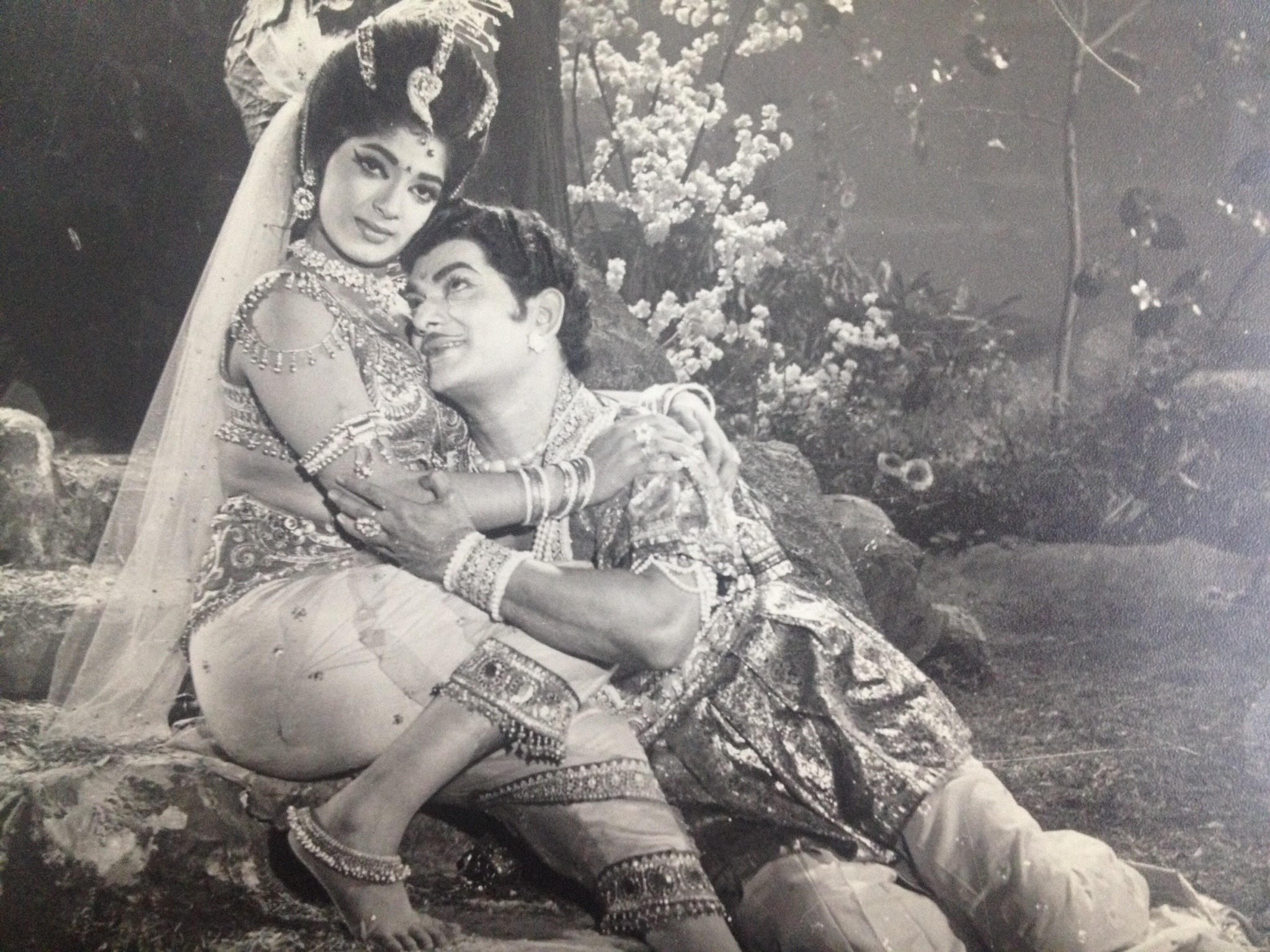
- Vijaya Lalitha with Rajanala
- Born: Anaparthy, East Godavari District, Andhrapradesh,India
- Occupation: Actress
- Years active: 1962-1997

Vijayalalitha or Vijaya Lalitha is an Indian actress who appeared in Telugu, Tamil, Malayalam, Kannada and Hindi films in the 1960s and 1970s. She is best known for her appearances in Rani Mera Naam (1972), Baazigar (1972) and Saakshi (1967). She is also the aunt of Vijayashanti, Telugu superstar actress turned politician.

== Early life and background ==
Vijayalalitha is a relative to actress Vijayashanti. Vijayashanti is the daughter of Vijayalalitha's elder sister. Vijaya Lalitha has acted in 860 movies.

== Career ==
Lalitha starred in many Telugu films in the 1960s and 1970s. She also starred in Tamil, Malayalam, Kannada and a few Hindi movies, such as Sadhu Aur Shaitaan, Rani Mera Naam and Hathkadi. She was well known as the "Female James Bond" in the Tamil and Telugu industries and was frequently paired with "South India James Bond" actor Jaishankar in many Tamil movies. Her dance and song sequence "Palinginal Oru Maalikai" from Vallavan Oruvan is known as an evergreen until now. Some of her memorable Tamil movies together with Jaishankar are Neelagiri Express, Kannan Varuvan, Kalam Vellum, Mappilai Azhaippu, Nootrukku Nooru, Nil Gavani Kadhali, Akka Thangai, Pattanathil Bhootham, Vallavan Oruvan, Ner Vazhi, Delhi To Madras and more. She acted in several female-oriented movies and is known for her punctuality in film sets. She regularly acted with N. T. Rama Rao and Akkeneni Nageswara Rao in Telugu movies. She produced the Telugu movie, Oka Naari Vanda Thupaakulu (1973) and cast herself as the heroine as well. She was very famous at her career peak in 1977 to 1981, receiving more movies. Within a short period, she created sensation as an action heroine. In some of the Tamil movies she appeared in arrogant and negative roles. She acted opposite Nagesh in Then Kinnam, Hello Partner and with M. G. Ramachandran in Kadhal Vaaganam. She portrayed "Sheela", an arrogant girl in Shanti Nilayam. Throughout 3 decades, Vijayalalitha has acted in 860 movies majoring all 4 South Indian and Hindi languages as well.. Vijayalalitha is more known in Kannada cinema as the bar dancer in the song "Jokae Nannu Balliya Minchu" from the film Paropakari.

== Selected filmography ==
In order of languages in which she acted the most to fewest films.

=== Telugu ===
1. Bheemanjaneya Yuddham (1966)
2. Bhakta Prahlada (1967)
3. Chikkadu Dorakadu (1967)
4. Devuni Gelichina Manavudu (1967) as Mitravinda
5. Gudachari 116 (1967)
6. Peddakkayya (1967)
7. Premalo Pramaadam (1967)
8. Private Master (1967)
9. Raktha Sindhooram (1967)
10. Saakshi (1967)
11. Aggi Dora (1967) as Chitra
12. Veera Pooja (1967)
13. Aggi Meeda Guggilam (1968) as Aruna
14. Amayakudu (1968)
15. Baghdad Gaja Donga (1968)
16. Bangaru Sankellu (1968)
17. Bhale Monagadu (1968)
18. Bharya (1968)
19. Devudichina Bhartha (1968)
20. Kalisochina Adrushtam (1968)
21. Kumkuma Barani (1968)
22. Nadamanthrapu Siri (1968)
23. Nindu Samsaram (1968)
24. Ninne Pellaaduthaa (1968)
25. Pedaraasi Peddamma katha (1968)
26. Talli Tandrulu (1968)
27. Vintha Kapuram (1968) as Kalpana
28. Sri Rama Katha (1969)
29. Devudichina Bhartha (1969) as Mayawati
30. Adrustavanthulu (1969)
31. Aggi Veerudu (1969)
32. Bhale Rangadu (1969)
33. Jarigina Katha (1969) as Manjula
34. Bommalu Cheppina Katha (1969)
35. Gandara Gandadu (1969) as Manjari
36. Jagath Kilaadeelu (1969)
37. Kadaladu Vadaladu (1969)
38. Mathru Devatha (1969)
39. Akka Chellelu (1969) as Asha, dancer
40. Panchakalyani Dongala Rani (1969)
41. Sattekaalapu Satteyya (1969)
42. Koothuru Kodalu
43. Takkari Donga Chakkani Chukka (1969)
44. Aasthulu Anthasthulu(1969)
45. Basti Kilaadeelu (1970)
46. Bhale Ettu Chivaraku Chithu (1970)
47. Jagath Jetteelu (1970) as Julie
48. Basti Kilaadeelu (1970)
49. Pasidi Manasulu (1970)
50. Maa Naanna Nirdhoshi (1970)
51. Merupu Veerudu (1970)
52. Pacchani Samsaram (1970)
53. Paga Saadhistaa (1970)
54. Pasidi Manasulu (1970)
55. Pettandarulu (1970)
56. Suguna Sundari Katha (1970) as Tilottama/Swarna Manjari
57. Vidhi Vilasam (1970) as Lalitha
58. Thaali Bottu (1970) as Lalitha
59. Yamalokapu Goodhachari (1970)
60. Kodalu Diddina Kapuram (1970)
61. Ukku Pidugu
62. Sapthaswaralu
63. Andariki Monagaadu (1971)
64. Andam Kosam Pandem (1971) as Himani
65. Anuradha (1971) as Vijaya
66. Chalaki Rani Kilaadi Raja (1971)
67. Rowdeelaku Rowdeelu (1971) as Vijaya
68. James Bond 777 (1971)
69. Kathiki Kankanam (1971)
70. Basti Bulbul (1971) as Pratima
71. Revolver Rani (1971) as Rani
72. Bullemma Bullodu (1972)
73. Nijam Nirupistha (1972) as Lalitha
74. Badi Panthulu (1972) as Jaya, wife of Krishnam Raju
75. Manuvu Manasu (1973)
76. Nindu Kutumbam (1973) as Radha
77. Oka Nari Vanda Thupakulu (1973) - producer as well
78. Mallamma Katha (1973)
79. Doctor Babu (1973)
80. Palleturi Chinnodu (1974)
81. Uttama Illalu (1974) as Latha
82. Manushullo Devudu (1974)
83. Chairman Chalamayya (1974)
84. Mooga Prema (1975)
85. Aradhana (1976)
86. Aalu Magalu (1977)
87. Seetha Rama Vanavasam (1977)
88. Kollimalai Kumarigal (1978)
89. Kamalamma Kamatham (1979)
90. Andadu Aagadu (1979) as Menaka
91. Devudu Mamayya (1981)
92. Prathikaram (1982)
93. Aadadaani Sawaal (1983)
94. Railu Dopidi (1984) as Rani
95. Naa Pilupe Prabhanjanam (1986) as Himabindu
96. Tandra Paparayudu (1986)
97. Hanthakudi Veta (1987)
98. Aarthanadham (1989) as Neelaveni
99. Intinta Deepavali (1990)
100. Mama Alludu (1991)
101. Naa Pellaam Naa Ishtam (1991)
102. Pandirimancham (1991)
103. Chinna Rayudu (1992) as Kameswari
104. Mother India (1992)
105. Naga Jyothi (1993)
106. Jailor Gari Abbayi (1994)
107. Raja Simham (1995)
108. Sahasa Veerudu Sagara Kanya (1996) as Mantrala Maanchaala

=== Tamil ===
This list is incomplete; you can help by expanding it.

1. Kaattumaina (1963)
2. Kathal Paduthum Padu (1966)
3. Vallavan Oruvan (1966)
4. Pattanathil Bhootham (1967)
5. Bhakta Prahlada (1967)
6. Ethirigal Jakkirathai (1967)
7. Neelagiri Express (1968)
8. Kadhal Vaaganam (1968)
9. Ner Vazhi (1968)
10. Akka Thangai (1969)
11. Anjal Petti 520 (1969)
12. Shanti Nilayam (1969)
13. Nil Gavani Kadhali (1969)
14. Thirudan (1969)
15. Sorgam (1970)
16. Revolver Reeta (1970)
17. Patham Pasali (1970)
18. Namma Veettu Deivam (1970)
19. Kalam Vellum (1970)
20. Kalyana Oorvalam (1970)
21. Ethiroli (1970)
22. Meendum Vazhven (1971)
23. Then Kinnam (1971)
24. Nootrukku Nooru (1971)
25. Nangu Suvargal (1971)
26. Gun Fight Kanchana (1972)
27. Hello Partner (1972)
28. Savaluku Saval (1972)
29. Kannan Varuvan (1972)
30. Mappilai Azhaippu (1972)
31. Delhi To Madras (1972)
32. Enna Muthalali Soukkiyama (1972)
33. Kai Niraya Kaasu (1974)
34. Hotel Sorgam (1975)
35. Jai Balaji (1976)
36. Ungalil Oruthi (1976)
37. Suprabatham (1979)
38. Nallathoru Kudumbam (1979)
39. CID Vijaya (1980)
40. Thunichalkari (1982)
41. Visha Kanni (1985)
42. Senthoora Poove (1988)
43. Athisaya Piravi (1989)
44. Valli Vara Pora (1995)

=== Malayalam ===
1. Sheelavathi (1967)
2. Cochin Express (1967)
3. Viplavakarikal (1968) as Radha
4. Mister Kerala (1969)
5. Saraswathi (1970)
6. Vrindavanam (1974)
7. Arakkallan Mukkalkkallan (1974)
8. Pennpada (1975) as Sreedevi & Geetha (Double Role)
9. Alibabayum 41 Kallanmaarum (1975)
10. Kaduvaye Pidicha Kiduva (1977)
11. Kannappanunni (1977)
12. Penpuli (1977)
13. Pattalam Janaki (1977)
14. Paavaadakkaari (1978)
15. Snehikkan Samayamilla (1978)
16. Puthariyankam (1978)
17. Society Lady (1978)
18. Ashokavanam (1978)
19. Aalmaaraattam (1978)
20. Black Belt (1978)
21. Thacholi Ambu (1978)
22. Ithaanente Vazhi (1978)
23. Avalude Prathikaram (1979)
24. Ponnil Kulicha Rathri (1979)
25. Vijayam Nammude Senani (1979)
26. Iniyum Kaanaam (1979)
27. Sanchari (1981)
28. Eettappuli (1983)

=== Kannada ===
1. Parvathi Kalyana (1967)
2. Devara Gedda Manava (1967)
3. Jedara Bale (1968)
4. Bangalore Mail (1968)
5. Choori Chikkanna (1969)
6. Chikkamma (1969)
7. Paropakari (1970)
8. Rangamahal Rahasya (1970)
9. Modala Rathri (1970)
10. Bidugade (1973)
11. Viplava Vanithe (1975)
12. Kalla Kulla (1975)
13. Banashankari (1977)
14. Sose Tanda Soubhagya (First cinema scope Kannada film 1977)
15. Bhoolokadalli Yamaraja (1979)
16. Mallige Hoove (1992)

=== Hindi ===
1. Sadhu Aur Shaitan (1968)
2. Rani Mera Naam (1972) as Rani
3. Baazigar (1972)
4. Lok Parlok (1979)
5. Hathkadi (1995) as Latha (Major's wife)
