= Aapta Mitrulu =

- Theatrical release poster
- Directed by: Kadaru Nagabhushanam
- Written by: Samudrala Jr (dialogues)
- Produced by: Kadaru Nagabhushanam
- Starring: N. T. Rama Rao; Krishna Kumari; Kanta Rao
- Cinematography: Lakshman Gore
- Edited by: S. K. Gopal
- Music by: Ghantasala
- Production company: Sri Raja Rajeswari Film Company
- Release date: 29 May 1963
- Running time: 143 mins
- Country: India
- Language: Telugu

Aapta Mitrulu (transl. Close Friends) is a 1963 Indian Telugu-language drama film, produced and directed by Kadaru Nagabhushanam under the Sri Raja Rajeswari Film Company banner. It stars N. T. Rama Rao, Krishna Kumari, and Kanta Rao, and the music is composed by Ghantasala.

== Plot ==
Shekar owns a company and hails from a rich family, Prakash works in that company and belongs to a middle-class family. Shekar is devious and snares Prakash’s sister Vimala into love. Kamalamma moves to Kameswara Rao with a marriage proposal for Shekar to wed Kokila. Shekar is interested in marrying her as well, but has a poor impression of Prakash once he realizes that Prakash and Kokila want to marry.

Shekar marries Vimala secretly without the knowledge of his mother. Once she conceives, he divulges his true intentions to her and tells her to leave. Meanwhile, Kokila remains unmarried and continuously denies the matches her parents bring her, telling them she will only marry Prakash.

A group of goons hired by Shekar try to kill Prakash . After the scuffle, Prakash's belongings are found on a railway track, and he is presumed to have committed suicide. Prakash now seeks vengeance.

== Cast ==
- N. T. Rama Rao as Prakash
- Krishna Kumari as Vimala
- Kanta Rao as Shekhar
- Relangi as Kameswara Rao
- Mikkilineni as Dhanakoti
- Perumallu as Ramaiah
- A. V. Subba Rao
- Girija as Kanakam
- Rajasulochana as Kokila
- Kannamba as Kamalamma
- Rushyendramani as Shantamma

== Soundtrack ==
Aapta Mitrulu

Film score by Ghantasala
- Released: 1963
- Genre: Soundtrack
- Length: 20:38
- Producer: Ghantasala

Music composed by Ghantasala. Lyrics were written by Samudrala Jr.

S. No.	Song title	Singers	length
1	"Dayarada Naameeda"	P. Leela	2:16
2	"Rathi Manmadha"	P. Leela, A. P. Komala	5:09
3	"Raave Cheli Ee Vela"	Ghantasala, P. Leela	3:48
4	"Chilipi Chirunavvu"	P. Susheela	2:00
5	"Ea Lokamu Maha Mosamu"	Ghantasala	3:15
6	"Ramananu Brovara"	P. Leela, Swarnalatha, Sarojini	4:10
