= Oorummadi Brathukulu =

Oorummadi Bratukulu
- Directed by: B. S. Narayana
- Produced by: J Venkatarya; G. K. Murthy
- Starring: Rallapalli; Satyendra Kumar; Madhavi
- Music by: M. B. Sreenivasan
- Release date: 1976
- Country: India
- Language: Telugu

Oorummadi Bratukulu is a 1976 Indian Telugu-language film directed by B. S. Narayana. The film won National Film Award for Best Feature Film in Telugu in 1976.

== Soundtrack ==
- Sramaika Jeevana Soundaryaniki Samanamainadi Lene Ledoyi (Lyrics: Srirangam Srinivasa Rao; Music: M. B. Srinivas; Singer: S. P. Balasubrahmanyam)

== Awards ==
- National Film Award for Best Feature Film in Telugu
- Nandi Award for Best Feature Film - Gold - J. Venkatarya & G. K. Murthy
