= Punarjanma (1963 film) =

- Theatrical release poster
- Directed by: K. Pratyagatma
- Screenplay by: K. Pratyagatma
- Based on: Patthar Ke Honth by Gulshan Nanda
- Produced by: A. V. Subba Rao
- Starring: Akkineni Nageswara Rao; Krishna Kumari
- Cinematography: P. S. Selvaraj
- Edited by: A. Sanjeevi
- Music by: T. Chalapathi Rao
- Production company: Prasad Art Pictures
- Distributed by: Navayuga Films
- Release date: 29 August 1963
- Running time: 127 minutes
- Country: India
- Language: Telugu

Punarjanma (transl. Rebirth) is a 1963 Indian Telugu-language drama film, produced by A. V. Subba Rao and written and directed by K. Pratyagatma. Based on the novel Patthar Ke Honth by Gulshan Nanda, it stars Akkineni Nageswara Rao and Krishna Kumari, with music composed by T. Chalapathi Rao. The film was remade in Hindi as Khilona (1970), in Tamil as Engirundho Vandhaal (1970) and in Malayalam as Amrithavaahini (1976).

== Cast ==
- Akkineni Nageswara Rao as Gopi
- Krishna Kumari as Radha
- Ramana Reddy as Professor
- Gummadi as Zamindar
- Padmanabham as Raja Rao
- Prabhakar Reddy as Gopi's Brother
- Raja Babu Basava Rao
- Chadalavada as Radha's Uncle
- Suryakantam as Yashoda Devì
- Hemalatha as Gopi's Grandmother
- L. Vijayalakshmi as Dancer
- Sandhya as Janaki
- Vasanthi as Vasanti
- Nirmalamma as Radha's Mother

== Soundtrack ==
Music composed by T. Chalapathi Rao.

| S. No. | Song title | Lyrics | Singers | length |
|---|---|---|---|---|
| 1 | "Evarivo Neevarivo" | Sri Sri | Ghantasala | 6:08 |
| 2 | "Deepalu Velige" | Daasarathi | P. Susheela | 3:00 |
| 3 | "Neekosam" | Kosaraju | P. Susheela | 4:34 |
| 4 | "Poolu Virisenu" | Daasarathi | P. Susheela | 3:44 |
| 5 | "Neekosam" (Pathos) | Kosaraju | P. Susheela | 3:44 |
| 6 | "Manasu Terachi Choodu" | C. Narayana Reddy | P. Susheela | 1:32 |

== Reception ==
T. M. Ramachandran, writing for Sport and Pastime, commended the cast performances, music and art direction.
