= Pankajavalli (film) =

- Poster
- Directed by: S. Soundararajan Ayyangar
- Screenplay by: S. Soundararajan Ayyangar
- Based on: Malayala Pankajavalli
- Produced by: S. Soundararajan Ayyangar
- Starring: P. U. Chinnappa; T. R. Rajakumari; Kumari Rukmani
- Music by: Papanasam Sivan
- Production company: Tamil Nadu Talkies
- Distributed by: Valli Pictures
- Release date: 5 February 1947
- Country: India
- Language: Tamil

Pankajavalli is a 1947 Indian Tamil-language film written, produced and directed by S. Soundararajan. The film starred P. U. Chinnappa, T. R. Rajakumari and Kumari Rukmani. The film was basically the story of Alli, who dominates men in her kingdom and treats them like slaves. The film was inspired by the popular Kerala folktale Malayala Pankajavalli, which Ayyangar adapted. The film was released on 5 February 1947.

== Plot ==
Arjuna decides to conquer Pankajavalli. However, she captures him. He prays to Krishna, who turns him into a woman named Brihannala. After many incidents, the truth comes out and everything ends happily.

== Cast ==
- P. U. Chinnappa as Arjuna
- T. R. Rajakumari as Pankajavalli
- Kumari Rukmaini as Krishna

== Production ==
The role of Krishna was played by a woman, at a time when women portray male figures was unusual.

== Soundtrack ==
The film's music was composed and lyrics by Papanasam Sivan. His assistant and P. U. Chinnappa sat together. Chinnappa apparently felt that Papanasam Sivan favoured M. K. Thyagaraja Bhagavathar. So during the session, he expressed this to Sivan, who smiled and told him that while Bhagavathar had a high pitched voice conducive for songs such as Manmadaleelaiyai (from Haridas) Chinnappa had a low-pitched voice. After, this Sivan wrote the opening line of the first song of the film – a prayer song in Ragha Karaha Priya. Sivan also sang the song Nee Illamal Anuvum Asaiyumo.

No	Songs	Singer	Lyrics	Duration
1	"Nee Illamal Anuvum Aasaiyumo"	P. U. Chinnappa	Papanasam Sivan	03:19
2	"Aaruyirellam Amuthum"	P. U. Chinnappa	Papanasam Sivan	03:14
3	"Dheivamum Mandhira Vaal	T. R. Rajakumari	Papanasam Sivan	03:02
4	"Devinin Vadivazhagai"	T. R. Rajakumari	Papanasam Sivan	03:03
5	"Vennilave.... Aaruyirkkellam"	P. U. Chinnappa	Papanasam Sivan	03:18
6	"Utthama Nanban Unpol Undo"	P. U. Chinnappa	Papanasam Sivan	03:11
