= B. Vittalacharya =

Indian film director, producer (1920–1999)

- Born: 28 January 1920; Udupi, Madras Presidency, British India (Present day in Karnataka, India)
- Died: 28 May 1999 (aged 79)
- Other names: Jaanapada Brahma, Maayaajala Mannan
- Occupations: Film director; producer
- Years active: 1944–1993
- Spouse: Jayalakshmi Acharya

B. Vittalacharya (28 January 1920 – 28 May 1999) was an Indian film director and producer known for his works in Telugu and Kannada cinema. He was known as Janapada Brahma in the Telugu film industry. Vittalacharya formed his film production company, Vittal Productions, which produced the first film directed by him, Rajya Lakshmi.

In 1952, he did his first movie Sri Srinivasa Kalyana in Kannada. He went on to make Kannada movies after the success of Sri Srinivasa Kalyana. In 1954, he produced and directed Kanyadhanam, a revolutionary Kannada film for that time. Wishing to remake the same in Telugu, he moved to Madras and settled there. After making two more Kannada movies, he concentrated on producing and directing. He also directed movies for other producers. He directed a total of 19 movies with N. T. Rama Rao, the doyen of Telugu cinema at the time. Though he did not get any awards, most of his films were box office successes, and he was fondly called "Jaanapada Brahma" and "Maayaajala Mannan" by his fans. He was well known for the visual effects shown in most of his movies.

== Biography ==
B. Vithalacharya was born into a Madhwa Brahmin family on 28 January 1920 in Udayavara, in the then Udupi Taluk as a seventh child. He was interested in dramas, Bayalata and Yakshagana since childhood. His father, Padmanabhacharya, was a noted ayurvedic doctor who used to treat patients free of cost. He studied only up to third class. He left the house to seek his fortune at the age of nine years. Reaching Arasikere, he did odd jobs and finally bought a Udupi Restaurant from his cousin. He successfully ran the hotel.

He participated in the Quit India Movement against the British Government along with some friends. He was imprisoned. After release from the jail, he handed over his hotel business to his younger brother. He established One Touring Cinema in Hassan District along with his friend Sri D. Shankar Singh and others.

He was the executive partner running the Touring Talkies on a daily basis. He multiplied the single Touring Talkies into four units. He used to watch each and every film they screened and learnt film-making techniques practically. In 1944, he married Jayalakshmi Acharya, the third daughter of U. Ramadasa Acharya of K. R. Pete.

With the same friends and Shankar Singh, they moved to Mysore and formed a film production company under the banner of Mahatma Pictures. They produced 18 Kannada pictures from 1944 to 1953, among them very successful ones like Naga Kanya, Jagan Mohini, and Srinivasa Kalyana. During that period, one by one the partners parted company, and finally only D. Shankar Singh and Vittalacharya remained. Some of the films were directed by others, some by D. Shankar Singh, and some by Vittalacharya.

In 1953, he parted ways with D. Shankar Singh, and formed his own company under the banner Vittal Productions and produced and directed his first film, Rajya Lakshmi. In 1954, he produced and directed Kanyadhanam, a revolutionary Kannada film for that time. Wishing to remake the same in Telugu, he moved to Madras and settled there till his death.

== Filmography ==
List of B. Vittalacharya film credits
Year	Title	Language	Notes
1952	Sri Srinivasa Kalyana	Kannada	Director and producer
1953	Rajya Lakshmi	Kannada	Director and producer
1954	Kanyadhanam	Kannada	Director and producer
1956	Muttiyde Baghya	Kannada	Director and producer
1956	Vaddante Pelli	Telugu	Director and producer
1957	Jaya Vijaya	Kannada	Director and producer
1957	Mane Thumbida Hennu	Kannada	Producer
1958	Anna Chellalu	Telugu	Director
1958	Mane Thumbida Hennu	Kannada	Director
1958	Pelli Meeda Pelli	Telugu	Director and producer
1959	Penn Kulathin Pon Villakku	Tamil	Director
1960	Anna Chellelu	Telugu	Director
1960	Kanaka Durga Pooja Mahima	Telugu	Director and producer
1961	Varalakshmi Vratham	Telugu	Director and producer
1962	Khaidi Kannayya	Kannada	Director
1962	Madana Kama Raju Katha	Telugu	Director and producer
1963	Manthiri Kumaran	Tamil	Director
1963	Bandipotu	Telugu	Director
1963	Guruvunu Minchina Sishyudu	Telugu	Director and producer
1963	Nava Graha Pooja Mahima	Telugu	Director and producer
1963	Veera Kesari	Kannada	Director
1964	Aggi Pidugu	Telugu	Director and producer
1965	Jwaladweepa Rahasyam	Telugu	Director
1965	Mangamma Sapatham	Telugu	Director
1965	Vijaya Simha	Kannada	Director
1966	Aggi Barata	Telugu	Director and producer
1966	Iddaru Monagallu	Telugu	Director
1967	Chikkadu Dorakadu	Telugu	Director
1967	Pidugu Ramudu	Telugu	Director
1967	Aggi Dora	Telugu	Director and producer
1968	Bhale Monagadu	Telugu	Director
1968	Kadaladu Vadaladu	Telugu	Director
1969	Gandikota Rahasyam	Telugu	Director
1969	Aggi Veerudu	Telugu	Director and producer
1970	Ali Baba 40 Dongalu	Telugu	Director
1970	Lakshmi Kataksham	Telugu	Director
1970	Vijayam Manade	Telugu	Director
1971	Rajakota Rahasyam	Telugu	Director
1971	C. I. D. Raju	Telugu	Producer
1972	Beedala Patlu	Telugu	Director and producer
1973	Palleturi Chinnodu	Telugu	Director and producer
1974	Aadadani Adrushtam	Telugu	Director and producer
1975	Kotalo Paga	Telugu	Director and producer
1978	Jaganmohini	Telugu	Director and producer
1979	Gandharva Kanya	Telugu	Director and producer
1980	Madana Manjari	Telugu	Director and producer
1983	Nava Mohini	Telugu	Director and producer
1984	Jai Bhetala 3D	Telugu	Story and Screen Play
1985	Mohini Sapadham	Telugu	Producer and director
1986	Veera Pratap	Telugu	Director
1987	Sri Devi Kamakshi Kataksham	Telugu	Director
1991	Srisaila Bhramarambika Kataksham	Telugu	Director
1992	Karuninchina Kanakadurga	Telugu	Director
