= Chikkadu Dorakadu (1967 film) =

- Theatrical release poster
- Directed by: B. Vittalacharya
- Written by: Vituri (dialogues)
- Screenplay by: B. Vittalacharya
- Story by: B. V. Acharya
- Produced by: Potluri Venkatanarayana; Kuduruvalli Seetarama Swamy
- Starring: N. T. Rama Rao; Kanta Rao; Jayalalithaa; Krishna Kumari
- Cinematography: H. S. Venu
- Edited by: K. Govinda Swamy; A. Mohan
- Music by: T. V. Raju
- Production company: Sri Lakshmi Narayana Productions
- Release date: 21 December 1967
- Running time: 163 mins
- Country: India
- Language: Telugu

Chikkadu Dorakadu (transl. He cannot be caught, he cannot be found) is a 1967 Indian Telugu-language swashbuckler film directed by B. Vittalacharya and produced by Sri Lakshmi Narayana Productions. It stars N. T. Rama Rao, Kanta Rao, Jayalalithaa and Krishna Kumari, with music composed by T. V. Raju. The film was remade in Hindi as Jay Vejay (1977).

== Cast ==
- N. T. Rama Rao as Chikkadu
- Kanta Rao as Dorakadu / Dilipa Chakravarthy
- Jayalalithaa as Priyamvada Devi
- Krishna Kumari as Padmavathi Devi
- Mikkilineni as Dharmapala Maharaju
- Satyanarayana as Prachanda Sena
- Thyagaraju as Simhabala
- Balakrishna as Gangulu
- K. V. Chalam
- Jagga Rao
- Vijaya Lalitha as Manjuvani
- Chaya Devi as Amaravathi
- Meena Kumari as Madanam
- Rajeswari

== Soundtrack ==
Chikkadu Dorakadu

Film score by T. V. Raju
- Released: 1967
- Genre: Soundtrack
- Length: 29:12
- Producer: T. V. Raju

T. V. Raju chronology
Bhaama Vijayam (1967)	Chikkadu Dorakadu (1967)	Ummadi Kutumbam (1967)

Music composed by T. V. Raju.

S. No.	Song title	Lyrics	Singers	length
1	"Andhaalanni Neeve"	C. Narayana Reddy	Ghantasala, P. Susheela, B. Vasantha, Raghuram	4:37
2	"Avuraa Veeraadhi"	C. Narayana Reddy	Ghantasala, P. B. Sreenivas	5:06
3	"Dora Nimma Pandu"	C. Narayana Reddy	Ghantasala, P. Susheela	3:05
4	"Idhigo Nenunnanu"	C. Narayana Reddy	P. Susheela	3:11
5	"Inthalo Yemo"	C. Narayana Reddy	P. Susheela	3:16
6	"Kanne Pilla Anagaane"	Veeturi	P. Susheela	3:21
7	"O Labbi"	C. Narayana Reddy	P. Susheela	3:35
8	"Pagati Poota"	C. Narayana Reddy	Ghantasala, P. Susheela	3:01
