= B. S. Narayana =

Indian film director (1929–1994)

- Born: Karimnagar district, Telangana
- Occupation: Director

B. S. Narayana (1929-1994) is an Indian film director known for his work in Telugu cinema. He has garnered two National Film Awards and two Nandi Awards. He was a member of the Indian delegation to the Tashkent Film Festival in 1974, and the Moscow International Film Festival in 1975.

== Brief life sketch ==
Rao was born in 1929 in Karimnagar district (erstwhile Andhra Pradesh). After working in social resistance against Nizam, he reached Madras and worked as assistant to H. V. Babu. His debut film in 1960s is Mangalyam. After his success as award-winning director with Nimajjanam and Oorummadi Bratukulu, he worked for the welfare of cine technicians. His films are mostly based on theme related to middle-class women. His health related to Diabetes Mellitus got worsened in 1990 and he became blind. In spite of this he made Margadarshi in 1993 with local artists and got entry into the Limca Book of Records as the first blind film director.

== Awards ==
National Film Awards for Best Feature Film in Telugu

- Oorummadi Brathukulu (1976)
- Nimajjanam (1979)

Nandi Awards

- Best Feature Film - Gold - Oorummadi Brathukulu (1976)
- Best Film on National Integration - Margadarsi (1993)

== Filmography ==
As director

- Edureetha (1963)
- Thirupathamma Katha (1963)
- Visala Hrudayalu (1965)
- Aame Evaru? (1966)
- Ananda Nilayam (1971)
- Sreevaru Maavaru (1973)
- Aadavallu-Apanindalu (1976)
- Oorummadi Brathukulu (1976)
- Nimajjanam (1979)
- Aadadi Gadapadatithe (1980)
- Maargadarsi (1993)
