= Haranath (actor) =

Indian actor (1936–1984)

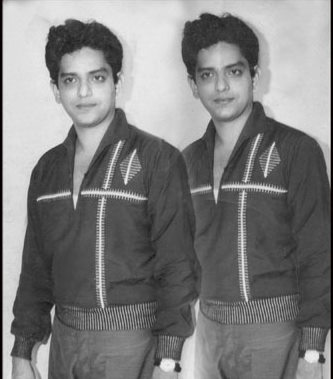
- Born: 2 September 1936; Raparthi, East Godavari district, Andhra Pradesh, India
- Died: 1 November 1989 (aged 53)
- Occupation: Actor
- Years active: 1959–1984

Haranath (2 September 1936 – 1 November 1989) was an Indian actor who worked in Telugu films.

== Early life career ==
Haranath was born on 2 September 1936 in Raparthi near Pithapuram and Gollaprolu in East Godavari district. He did his B. A. degree in P R College, Kakinada. Mukkmamala Krishna Murthy, director and producer, cast him as a lead actor in the film Rushyasrunga. His second film Maa Inti Mahalakshmi was his first film to be released. He was a very popular Tollywood lead actor in the 60s being regarded as a romantic icon. He acted in classic films like Amarasilipi Jakkana, Letha Manasulu, Chitti Chellelu, Aada Janma, Maa Inti Devatha, Bhishma, Pandava Vanavasam, Abhimanyu and several others in lead roles. He was the hero of the first film shot at Saradhi Studios in Hyderabad, Ma Inti Mahalakshmi (1959). He played the role of Lord Sri Rama in the film Seetha Rama Kalyanam, produced by N.T. Rama Rao under the banner, National Art Theatres, in which NTR acted as Ravana. He also played the role of Lord Krishna in the 1962 film Bhishma and as Sri Rama in Sri Rama Katha (1969). He acted in about 117 Telugu films, 12 Tamil films, one Hindi and Kannada movie each. He played in many films opposite Jamuna. His last film was Thoduallulu in 1989. He produced one movie named Maa Inti Devatha, released in 1981.

== Filmography ==
1. Maa Inti Mahalakshmi (1959)
2. Runanubandham (1960)
3. Sahasra Siracheda Apoorva Chintamani (1960) as Purandhara Maharaju
4. Sri Seetha Rama Kalyanam (1961) as Rama
5. Kalasivunte Kaladu Sukham (1961)
6. Kula Mangai (1961) – Tamil
7. Pellikani Pillalu (1961)
8. Rushyasrunga (1961)
9. Gundamma Katha (1962) as Prabhakar, son of Gundamma
10. Manithan Maravillai (1962) – Tamil Version of Gundamma Katha
11. Bhishma (1962) as Krishna
12. Aatma Bandhuvu (1962) as Madhu
13. Annai (1962) – Tamil – as Selvam
14. Sumaithaangi (1962) – Tamil
15. Madana Kamaraju Katha (1962)
16. Manthiri Kumaran (1962) – Tamil
17. Pempudu Kuthuru (1963)
18. Amara Shilpi Jakkanna (1964) as Dankkanna
19. Murali Krishna (1964)
20. Pandava Vanavasam (1965) as Abhimanyu
21. Chandrahasa (1965)
22. Naadee Aada Janme (1965)
23. Leta Manasulu (1966) as Sekhar
24. Paduka Pattabhishekam (1966) as Pururava – Uncredited
25. Bhimanjaneya Yuddham (1966) as Lord Krishna
26. Palnati Yudham (1966) as Balachandrudu
27. Monagallaku Monagadu (1966) as Ramesh
28. Saraswati Sabatham (1966) – Tamil
29. Bhakta Prahlada (1967) as Vishnu
30. Bhakta Prahlada (1967) as Vishnu – Tamil
31. Bhakt Prahlad (1967) as Vishnu – Hindi
32. Chadarangam (1967)
33. Peddakkayya (1967)
34. Sri Sri Sri Maryada Ramanna (1967)
35. Punyavati (1967)
36. Aada Paduchu (1967)
37. Rahasyam (1967) as Narada
38. Bangaru Sankellu (1968)
39. Challani Needa (1968)
40. Nadimantrapu Siri (1968)
41. Sukha Dukhalu (1968)
42. Bandhavyalu (1968) as Gopalam
43. Palamanasulu (1968)
44. Pelli Roju (1968)
45. Muhurtha Balam (1969) as Inspector Anand
46. Manushulu Marali (1969)
47. Sri Rama Katha (1969) as Sri Rama
48. Pratheekaram (1969) as Mohan
49. Kathanayika Molla (1970)
50. Chitti Chellelu (1970)
51. Aada Janma (1970)
52. Basti Kiladilu (1970)
53. Sridevi (1970)
54. Engirundho Vandhaal (1970) – Tamil
55. Thalli Thandrulu (1970)
56. Bhale Papa (1971) as Bhaskar
57. Pattindalla Bangaram (1971) as Inspector/Nagabhushanam
58. Pagabattina Paduchu (1971) as Raja
59. Matrumoorti (1972)
60. Bala Bharatam (1972) as Narada
61. Maa Inti Kodalu (1972)
62. Kalavari Kutumbam (1972) as Defence Counsel
63. Mallela Manasulu (1975) as Krishnamohan
64. Bhakta Prahlada (1967) as Vishnu – Kannada
65. Maa Inti Devatha (1980)
66. Gadasari Atta Sogasari Kodalu (1981) as Chandram
67. Kayyala Ammayi Kalavaari Abbayi (1982) as Hari
68. Kalavari Samsaram (1982)
69. Bangaru Koduku (1982) as Murthy
70. Bangaru Bhoomi (1982) as Madhava Rao, Ravi's father
71. Naagu (1984) as Soori
72. Kotha Pelli Koothuru (1985) as Dr. Pratap
73. Tandra Paparayudu (1986) as Narasa Rayudu
74. Thodallullu (1988)
