= Engirundho Vandhaal =

1970 film directed by A. C. Tirulokchandar

- Theatrical release poster
- Directed by: A. C. Tirulokchandar
- Screenplay by: A. L. Narayanan
- Story by: Gulshan Nanda
- Produced by: K. Balaji
- Starring: Sivaji Ganesan; Jayalalithaa
- Cinematography: Masthan; M. Viswanath Rai
- Edited by: B. Kanthasamy
- Music by: M. S. Viswanathan
- Production company: Sujatha Cine Arts
- Release date: 29 October 1970
- Running time: 153 minutes
- Country: India
- Language: Tamil

Engirundho Vandhaal (transl. She Came From Nowhere) is a 1970 Indian Tamil-language film, directed by A. C. Tirulokchandar and produced by K. Balaji. The film stars Sivaji Ganesan and Jayalalithaa, with K. Balaji, M. Bhanumathi, Nagesh, Sundarrajan and Raja in supporting roles. It is a remake of the 1963 Telugu film Punarjanma, which in turn was based on the novel Patthar Ke Honth by Gulshan Nanda. The film was released on 29 October 1970, and became a silver jubilee hit. It later won the Filmfare Award for Best Film – Tamil.

== Plot ==
Sekar has lost his mind after being betrayed by his lover and his friend as they get married though the situation was manipulated by his friend Sukumar. She kills herself on the stage by setting herself on fire, driving him insane.

The family property remains in his name and is enjoyed by the rest of the family who treat him badly but keep him alive so that they can enjoy it. When forced to get a nurse, they instead get Radha, a courtesan, and present her as a nurse. However, her tender love and affection slowly brings Sekar back to sanity. Seeing that he is getting better, they venture to fire her. One thing leads to another and in the end, Sekar manages to save Radha from fire, thereby redeeming himself from his earlier failure to save his lover and getting sane again. They get married and forgive the relatives.

== Cast ==
- Sivaji Ganesan as Gunasekar (alis) Sekar
- Jayalalithaa as Radha (alis) Kamala
- K. Balaji as Dhanasekar
- Major Sundarrajan as Pattavarayan
- Muthuraman as Chandran
- Devika as Amuthavalli
- Aranmula Ponnamma as Shanthavalli
- Nagesh as Viswanathan (alias) Vichu
- Rama Prabha as Parvathi
- Sachu as Reetta
- Raja as Sukumar
- M. Bhanumathi as Mohana
- Jayakumari as Kavitha
- Baby Sumathi as Dhanasekar's daughter
- V. Nagayya as Dharmalingam
- S. D. Subbulakshmi as Vadivu
- Typist Gopu as Victor
- Thengai Srinivasan as Viswanathan's friend
- Kuladeivam Rajagopal as Samiyar
- Harikrishnan as Velu
- Pushphamala as Abirami

== Production ==
The film was originally titled Paithiyakkaran (transl. Mad man). Padmini was originally chosen as the lead actress; since she had to go to the United States, she was replaced by Jayalalitha. Ganesan's home, Annai Illam, features in the film.

== Soundtrack ==
The soundtrack was composed by M. S. Viswanathan, with lyrics by Kannadasan.

Song	Singers
"Ore Padal Unnai Azhaikkum"	T. M. Soundararajan
"Naan Unnai Azhaikkavillai"	T. M. Soundararajan
"Vandavargal Vaazhga"	S. Janaki
"Sirippil Undagum Ragathile"	T. M. Soundararajan, P. Susheela
"Sakunthalai Dushyanthan"	Sirkazhi Govindarajan, P. Leela
"Hello My Darling Ippo"	L. R. Eswari, SaiBaba
"Naan Unnai Azhaikkavillai Bit"	P. Susheela

== Release and reception ==
Engirundho Vandhaal was released on 29 October 1970, alongside another Sivaji Ganesan starrer Sorgam. The Indian Express wrote, "There are some touching scenes. The music by M. S. Viswanathan is passable. Comedy by Thengai Srinivasan and Nagesh, though unwarranted, is enjoyable." Jayalalithaa delivered what is widely considered one of the finest performances of her career, successfully matching the high-intensity, legendary acting prowess of Sivaji Ganesan. The film became a silver jubilee hit, and went on to win the Filmfare Award for Best Film – Tamil.
