= Bandipotu (1963 film) =

- Theatrical release poster
- Directed by: B. Vittalacharya
- Written by: Tripuraneni Maharadhi (story / dialogues)
- Screenplay by: B. Vittalacharya
- Produced by: Sundarlal Nahatha; Doondy
- Starring: N. T. Rama Rao; Krishna Kumari
- Cinematography: Ravikant Nagaich
- Edited by: N. S. Prakash
- Music by: Ghantasala
- Production company: Rajalakshmi Productions
- Release date: 15 August 1963
- Running time: 155 minutes
- Country: India
- Language: Telugu

Bandipotu (transl. Bandit) is a 1963 Indian Telugu-language swashbuckler film directed by B. Vittalacharya. It stars N. T. Rama Rao and Krishna Kumari, with music composed by Ghantasala. Tripuraneni Maharadhi wrote the story and dialogues. The film was produced by Sunderlal Nehataa and Doondy under the Raja Lakshmi Productions banner. Vittalacharya shot the film simultaneously in Kannada as Veera Kesari (1963), with Rajkumar. This film had its climax scene in Eastmancolor.

== Cast ==
- N. T. Rama Rao as Narasimham
- Krishna Kumari as Mandaramala
- Rajanala as Soorasimha
- V. Nagayya as Dharma Nayaka
- Gummadi as Satyasena Maharaju
- Relangi
- Ramana Reddy as Durjaya
- Mikkilineni as Veera Nayaka
- Vangara
- Balakrishna as a member of the Bandipotu clan
- Rajababu as a member of the Bandipotu clan
- Girija
- E. V. Saroja
- Leelavathi
- Pushpavalli as Annapoorna
- Meena Kumari

== Soundtrack ==
Bandipotu

Film score by Ghantasala
- Released: 1963
- Genre: Soundtrack
- Length: 27:59
- Label: Saregama Audio
- Producer: Ghantasala

Music composed by Ghantasala. The songs "Vagala Ranivineeve" and "Uhalu Gusagusalade" are evergreen blockbusters. Music released by SAREGAMA Audio Company.

S. No.	Song title	Lyrics	Singers	length
1	"Malliyallo Malliyallo"	C. Narayana Reddy	Ghantasala, P. Leela	6:15
2	"Vagala Ranivineeve"	C. Narayana Reddy	Ghantasala	3:44
3	"O Ante Teliyani"	Kosaraju	Ghantasala, P. Susheela	5:44
4	"Uhalu Gusagusalade"	Aarudhra	Ghantasala, P. Susheela	3:28
5	"Anta Nee Kosam"	C. Narayana Reddy	Ghantasala, P. Leela	3:27
6	"Manchitanamu Kalakalamu"	Dasaradhi	Ghantasala, P. Susheela, Chorus	5:21

== Reception ==
T. M. Ramachandran of Sport and Pastime praised the cast and crew of the film.
