= Bollimunta Sivaramakrishna =

Indian writer

Bollumuntha Sivaramakrishna
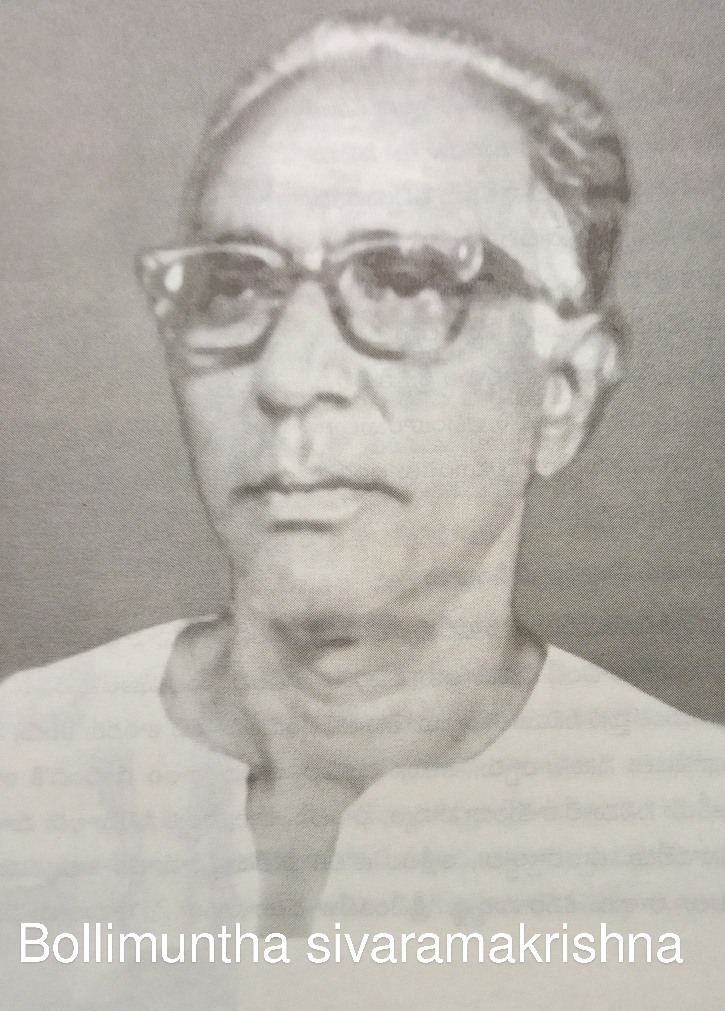
- Born: 27 November 1920; Chadalawada, Guntur district, Andhra Pradesh
- Died: 7 June 2005 (aged 84)
- Occupation: writer
- Known for: Writer, people's artist, teacher, Sanskrit scholar, musician, comunist leader, journalist, freedom fighter,playwright and novelist.
- Spouse: Bollimuntha venkata lakshmi
- Parents: Bollimuntha akkaiah (father); Bollimuntha mangamma (mother)

Bollumuntha Sivaramakrishna (1920–2005) was a prominent Telugu writer, playwright, and screenwriter known for his progressive and revolutionary literary contributions.

== Early life ==
Born in Chadalawada, Guntur district, he actively participated in the Telangana armed struggle and worked closely with the Communist Party. His novel Mrutyunjayulu, based on the Telangana movement, is considered a landmark in Telugu literature. He was also a key member of the Praja Natya Mandali, writing and performing plays that highlighted social issues. Apart from literature, he played a vital role in journalism as the editor of Pratibha magazine and wrote thought-provoking articles on political and social topics.

In the film industry, he collaborated with renowned filmmakers, contributing scripts, dialogues, and lyrics for over 50 movies, including vaagdhanam, Tirupathamma Katha, visala hrudayalu, Manushulu Maarali, sarada, Kalam maarindi, kalyana mandapam, Prajaanayakudu, and Nimajjanam. His films often reflected strong social themes, earning him state and national awards. His screenplay for Kaalam Maarindi won the Nandi Award, while Nimajjanam received a National Award. Throughout his life, he remained a committed writer, activist, and intellectual, using literature and cinema as powerful tools for social change.

== Literary works ==
- Antaratma Antyakriyalu (kadha samputi)
- Mrutyunjayulu (novel)
- Sukshmamlo moksham (kadha samputi)
- E Endaka godugu
- Patrika nyayam
- Poster (Street play)
- swatantra ghosha
- Quit kashmir
- Dharma samsthapanarthaya
- Rajakiya gayopakhyanam
- Rajakiya kurukshetram
- Donga dorikindi
- Kalasi andaru batakali
- Neti bharatam
- Annadata sukhibhava
- Bhale manchi chowkaberamu
- pillala kathalu
- bollumuntha sivaramakrishna natakalu natikalu
- andharu brathakali

== Cinema field ==
In 1960, renowned Telugu writer Athreya encouraged Bollimunta to move to Madras (now Chennai) and enter the film industry. He initially assisted Athreya before making his debut as a screenwriter with Vagdanam (1961). He soon gained recognition for his powerful dialogues and went on to work on over 54 films, including:

1. Tirupatamma katha (1963)
2. Peetala meeda pelli (1964)
3. Visala hrudayalu (1965)
4. Aame evaru (1966)
5. Manushulu maarali (1969)
6. Sridevi (1970)
7. Maa manchi akhaiah (1970)
8. Drohi (1970)
9. Pagapattina paduchu (1971)
10. Talli kuturlu (1971)
11. Kalyana mandapam (1971)
12. Ananda nilayam (1971)
13. Suputrudu (1971)
14. Kaalam maarindi (1972)
15. Manchirojulu vachayi (1972)
16. Prajanayakudu (1972)
17. Sarada (1973)
18. Khaidi babai (1973)
19. Srivaru-maavaaru (1973)
20. Kanna koduku (1973)
21. Palleturi chinnodu (1974)
22. Krishnaveni (1974)
23. Aadambaralu -anubandalu (1974)
24. Pallepaduchu (1974)
25. Kotha kaapuram (1975)
26. Poruginti pullakura (1976)
27. Gadusu ammayi (1977)
28. Bhadrakaali (1977)
29. Vichitra jeevitam (1978)
30. Nimarjanam (1979)
31. Bommalakoluvu (1980)
32. Mugaku maatavaste (1980)
33. Shanti (1980)
34. Bapuji bharatam (1980)
35. Pedala bratukulu (1981)
36. Ille swargam (1981)
37. Punadi rallu
38. Swatantram na janma hakku

== Publications ==
- Bollimunta Śivarāmakrishna kathalu, Bollimunta Sivaramakrishna, Visalandhra Publishing House, Hyderabad (1990) ISBN 81-7098-226-X; ISBN 978-81-7098-226-5.
- Bollimunta Śivarāmakrishna kathānikalu, kathalu, Bollimunta Sivaramakrishna, Visalandhra Publishing House, Hyderabad (1972)
