= Krishna Kumari (actress) =

Indian actress (1933–2018)

- Born: 6 March 1933; Naihati, Bengal Province, British India
- Died: 24 January 2018 (aged 84); Bangalore, Karnataka, India
- Occupation: Actress
- Years active: 1951–1976
- Spouse: Ajay Mohan Khaitan (m. 1969; died 2012)
- Relatives: Sowcar Janaki (sister)

T. Krishna Kumari (6 March 1933 – 24 January 2018) was an Indian actress. She worked predominantly in Telugu films, in addition to Tamil and Kannada films in the 1950s and 1960s. She was the sister of noted actress Sowkar Janaki.

She starred in over 150 films in her career, most notably Pichi Pullayya (1953), Bangaru Papa (1955), Vinayaka Chaviti (1957), Pelli Kanuka (1960), Devanthakudu (1960), Bharya Bhartalu (1961), Vagdanam (1961), Kula Gotralu (1962), Chaduvukunna Ammayilu (1963), Bandipotu (1963), Punarjanma (1963 film), Aggi Pidugu (1964), Doctor Chakravarty (1964), Gudi Gantalu (1964), Antastulu (1965), Chikkadu Dorakadu (1967),Tikka Sankarayya (1968), Neramu Siksha (1973).

== Early life ==
Krishna Kumari was born on 6 March 1933 in a Kannadiga Madhva Brahmin family in Naihati, West Bengal to T. Venkoji Rao and Sachi Devi. Her family hails from Udupi, Karnataka but settled in Rajahmundry, Andhra Pradesh for her father's business. Owing her father's work, Kumari was schooled at Rajahmundry, Madras, Assam and Calcutta. She completed her matriculation is Assam. Her sister, Sowkar Janaki is also an actress.

== Career ==
T. Krishna Kumari started her career at the age of 17 with a small role in the Telugu film Pathala Bhairavi (1951). She later played the role of a heroine for the first time in Navvite Navaratnalu (1951). She featured as leading actress in several Tamil movies, notably Thirumbi Paar (1953), Manithan (1953), Azhagi (1953), Pudhu Yugam (1954), Viduthalai (1954) and Thuli Visham (1954).

Krishna Kumari then began to focus on Telugu cinema, which propelled her to stardom. Her movies Pelli Meeda Pelli (1959), Bharya Bhartalu (1961), Vagdanam (1961), Kulagothralu (1962), Gudi Gantalu (1964) remain some of Telugu cinema's classics.

In the early 1960s, Krishna Kumari entered the Kannada film industry briefly, choosing to return to her preferred Telugu cinema within years. But in the short span of 5–6 years, she gave memorable performances, most of them co-starring Dr. Rajkumar. In fact, her first ever award was for the Rajkumar starrer, Bhaktha Kanakadasa (1960).

In Hindi, she acted in Kabhi Andhera Kabhi Ujala (1958). She was rechristened Rati but again, Hindi cinema held no attraction for Krishna Kumari. Although she had several offers in Hindi cinema, she returned to Madras. Her most successful movies have been with Akkineni Nageswara Rao, N. T. Rama Rao and also several mythological roles with Kantha Rao.

Krishna Kumari acted in 150 Telugu films, and about 30 Tamil and Kannada films. Her repertoire won her fans across Telugu states and the President's Award. Her co-stars include N.T. Rama Rao, Akkineni Nageswara Rao, Krishnam Raju, Dr. Rajkumar, Sivaji Ganesan, Kanta Rao, and Jaggayya.

== Personal life and death ==
In 1969, Krishna Kumari married Ajay Mohan Khaitan, a businessman and journalist who had previously served as Editor of the Indian Express and was the founder of two magazines, Screen and Businessman. Ajay Mohan Khaitan had previously been married to another lady also named Krishna, who was the daughter of Ramnath Goenka, founder and owner of The Indian Express. By his previous marriage, Ajay Mohan Khaitan was the father of two sons, including Vivek, who was adopted by Ramnath Goenka and given the name Viveck Goenka; he is presently running The Indian Express.

After marriage, Krishna Kumari chose to step away from the arclights and moved to her husband's farmhouse near Bangalore, where she devoted herself to her family and developed her interests in cooking and gardening. Krishna Kumari and Khaitan had a daughter, Dipika; according to some reports, Dipika was adopted by the couple. Dipika married Vikram Maiya, the son of the Maiya family which owns the famous MTR restaurant in Bangalore and the MTR brand of ready-to-eat foods.

Ajay Mohan Khaitan died in 2012 aged 85. Krishna Kumari continued to live at her farmhouse in Bangalore with her daughter, son-in-law and grandson. Krishna Kumari died on 24 January 2018, in Bangalore from bone marrow cancer.

== Filmography-Telugu & Tamil ==
Year	Title	Role(s)	Notes	Ref.
1951	Pathala Bhairavi	Gandharva Kanya	Uncredited role	
1951	Navvite Navaratnalu	Gowri		
1951	Mantra Dandam	Bhavani		
1952	Priyuralu			
1953	Pichi Pullayya	Kantham		
1954	Bangaru Papa	Papa		
1956	Ilavelpu			
1957	Vinayaka Chaviti	Rukmini		
1957	Veera Kankanam	Rajini		
1957	Vaddante Pelli	Vidyavathi		
1958	Raja Nandini			
1959	Sathi Sukanya	Sukanya		
1959	Sati Tulasi			
1960	Deepavali	Rukmini Devi		
1960	Pelli Kanuka	Geeta		
1960	Abhimanam	Kamala		
1960	Bhatha Sabari			
1960	Nithya Kalyanam Pacha Thoranam	Chand		
1960	Santhi Nivasam	Raagini		
1961	Bharya Bhartalu	Sharada		
1961	Vagdanam	Vijaya		
1962	Kula Gothralu	Saroja		
1962	Aasa Jeevulu		Simultaneously Telugu and Tamil	
1963	Chaduvukunna Ammayilu	Vasantha		
1963	Lakshadhikari	Padma		
1963	Punarjanma	Radha		
1963	Sri Tirupatamma Katha	Tirupatamma		
1963	Irugu Porugu	Chitra / Jikki		
1963	Aapta Mitrulu	Vimala		
1963	Bandipotu	Mandaramala		
1964	Doctor Chakravarthy	Dr. Sridevi		
1964	Gudi Gantalu	Kasthuri		
1964	Marmayogi	Prabhavathi		
1964	Peetala Meeda Pelli			
1964	Aggi Pidugu	Malathi		
1964	Sri Satyanarayana Mahathyam	Ratnavalli		
1964	Sabhash Suri	Jalaja		
1964	Kalavari Kodalu	Latha		
1965	Antastulu	Mala		
1965	Sri Simhachala Kshetra Mahima	Apsarasa Sirisha		
1965	Uyyala Jampala			
1966	Sri Krishna Tulabharam	Jambavathi		
1966	Chilaka Gorinka	K. Usha Devi		
1966	Paduka Pattabhishekam	Seetha		
1966	Zamindar	Saroja		
1967	Chikkadu Dorakadu	Padmavathi Devi		
1967	Iddaru Monagallu			
1967	Sri Krishnavataram	Lakshana		
1967	Ummadi Kutumbam	Sarada		
1967	Pedda Akkayya			
1967	Vasantha Sena	Vasantha Sena		
1967	Punyavathi	Santhi		
1967	Bhuvana Sundari Katha	Bhuvana Sundari		
1967	Rahasyam	Rajyalakshmi		
1968	Vara Katnam	Sujatha		
1968	Tikka Sankarayya	Suseela		
1968	Nindu Samsaram	Jyothi		
1968	Pedarasi Peddamma Katha	Nagakanya		
1971	Sampoorna Ramayanam	Mandodari		
1971	Varalakshmi Vratam			
1972	Manavudu Danavudu			
1972	Bharya Biddalu	Suseela		
1973	Neramu Siksha			
1974	Devadasu			
1974	Uttama Illalu	Gowri		
1975	Yashoda Krishna	Devaki		
1975	Gunavanthudu			
1975	Zamindarugari Ammayi	Lakshmi		
1976	Padi Pantalu	Kamala		
1976	Jyothi	Vishali		
1976	Alludochadu	Manikyamma mother of Saroja (Jayasudha)		
1976	Secretary	Dr. Vijayalakshmi		
1978	Patnavasam	Parvathi		
1980	Bebbuli	Yashoda		
1982	Bangaru Bhoomi	Ravi's step mother		
2003	Fools		Special appearance	

== Filmography-Other Languages ==
Year	Title	Role	Language
1953	Thirumbi Paar		Tamil
1953	Azhagi		Tamil
1953	Manithan		Tamil
1954	Pudhu Yugam		Tamil
1954	Viduthalai		Tamil
1954	Thuli Visham		Tamil
1954	Karkottai		Tamil
1958	Kabhi Andhera Kabhi Ujala	Rati	Hindi
1960	Umma		Malayalam
1961	Sampoorna Ramayana	Mandodari	Hindi
1954	Jaladurga		Kannada
1960	Bhakta Kanakadasa		Kannada
1960	Aasha Sundari	Hema	Kannada
1960	Dashavathara		Kannada
1961	Shri Shaila Mahathme		Kannada
1962	Swarna Gowri		Kannada
1962	Mahathma Kabir		Kannada
1962	Thendral Veesum		Tamil & Telugu
1963	Chandrakumara		Kannada
1965	Sathi Savithri	Savitri	Kannada
1968	Uyira Maanama	Russian woman	Tamil & Telugu
1968	Namma Ooru		Kannada
1976	Hosilu Mettida Henna	Akka	Kannada
1977	Deepa	Shanthakka	Kannada

== In popular culture ==
- Krishna Kumari was portrayed by actress Pranitha Subhash in the 2019 biographical film NTR: Kathanayakudu, based on the real life and acting career of N. T. Rama Rao.
