= List of Tamil songs recorded by S. Janaki =

S. Janaki was an Indian singer who has sung over 48,000 songs in various Indian languages. The following is a list of Tamil songs recorded by her:

== Before 1990s ==
=== 1950s ===
Year	Film	Song	Music director	Writer	Co-singer	Note
1957	Vidhiyin Vilayattu	Uladamidhuve Ulagamappaa	T. Chalapathi Rao			Unreleased movie
1957	Magathala Nattu Mary	Kannukku Naere Minnidum Thaarai	R. Parthasarathy	M. P. Sivam	P. B. Sreenivas	
1958	Athisaya Thirudan	Kokku Varnam Selaiyile	S. Dakshinamurthi & K. Prasad Rao		K. Jamuna Rani	
1958	Boologa Rambai	Arasakumara Bhuvanendrane	C. N. Pandurangan	Mugavai Rajamanickam	P. Susheela	
1958	Illarame Nallaram	Jaani Nee Vaa Vaa	K. G. Moorthy		A. L. Raghavan	
1958	Illarame Nallaram	Nilave Avan Yaar Endru	K. G. Moorthy			
1958	Illarame Nallaram	Maarane Un Malarkanai	K. G. Moorthy		P. Susheela & P. B. Sreenivas	
1958	Kudumba Gouravam	Kalyaanam Agaatha Kanni	Viswanathan–Ramamoorthy	A. Maruthakasi		
1958	Kudumba Gouravam	Singaaraa Oyyaaraa	Viswanathan–Ramamoorthy	A. Maruthakasi		
1958	Manamalai	Nilaiyaaga Veesudhe Alai Polave	Vedha			
1958	Maya Manithan	Achaa Pyaari Pombale	G. Govindarajulu Naidu	A. Maruthakasi	S. C. Krishnan	
1958	Maya Manithan	Kaana Venum Kaana Venum Endru	G. Govindarajulu Naidu	A. Maruthakasi		
1958	Maya Manithan	O! Radha, Ramana, Kanna	G. Govindarajulu Naidu	A. Maruthakasi		
1958	Thirudargal Jakkirathai	Azhage Unnai Kandom	K. V. Mahadevan	Kannadasan	P. B. Sreenivas	
1959	Abalai Anjugam	Ilaiya Kanniyin Azhagiya Vadhanam	K. V. Mahadevan	Kannadasan	T. R. Mahalingam	
1959	Azhagarmalai Kalvan	Selaadum Vanna Odai	B. Gopalam	Puratchidasan		
1959	Deiva Balam	Malarodu Vilaiyaadum Thendrale	G. Aswathama	A. Maruthakasi	P. B. Sreenivas	
1959	Deiva Balam	Nilavadhu Thavari Pennaai Maari	G. Aswathama	A. Maruthakasi	P. B. Sreenivas	
1959	Deiva Balam	Varave Varaadha Magizhve Tharaadaha	G. Aswathama	A. Maruthakasi	K. Rani	
1959	Deivame Thunai	Vadamadurai Mannan	S. M. Subbaiah Naidu	A. Maruthakasi	Soolamangalam Rajalakshmi, Kamala & Kumar	
1959	Deivame Thunai	O Raja Ennai Paaru	S. M. Subbaiah Naidu	Kadhiroli	A. L. Raghavan	
1959	Kalaivaanan	Vennaiyai Thirudi Thindru	Pendyala Nageswara Rao	Ra. Pazhanichami	S. C. Krishnan	
1959	Kan Thiranthathu	Panam Kaasu	V. T. Rajagopalan	V. Seetharaman	P. Susheela	
1959	Koodi Vazhnthal Kodi Nanmai	Onnu Venumaa Ille	T. Chalapathi Rao	Thanjai N. Ramaiah Dass		
1959	Koodi Vazhnthal Kodi Nanmai	Machaan Unnaithaane	T. Chalapathi Rao	Thanjai N. Ramaiah Dass		
1959	Naalu Veli Nilam	Inba Kavidhai Paadudhu	K. V. Mahadevan & M. K. Athmanathan	M. K. Athmanathan	R. Jayaraman	
1959	Naalu Veli Nilam	Kalyaanamaam Kalyaanam Kamala Ponne	K. V. Mahadevan & M. K. Athmanathan	M. K. Athmanathan	R. Jayaraman	
1959	Nala Damayanthi	Seena Seeyanna Sirichaa Pochannaa	B. Gopalam	Kuyilan		
1959	Paththarai Maathu Thangam	Ezhai Ennaalume Ezhaiyaa	G. Govindarajulu Naidu & Tiruvenkadu Selvarathinam	V. Lakshmana Das		
1959	Pandithevan	Chandi Miranda Kaadu Kollaadhu	C. N. Pandurangan & Meenakshi Subramanyam	Muhavai Rajamanickam		
1959	Pandithevan	Kannum Karutthum	C. N. Pandurangan & Meenakshi Subramanyam	Muthukoothan	Radha Jayalakshmi & K. Rani	
1959	Ponnu Vilaiyum Boomi	Chella Kiliye Sendhaamaraiye	K. H. Reddy	A. Maruthakasi	Jikki	
1959	Raja Malaiya Simman	Naadu Sezhippadhellaam.... Idhanaale Idhanaale	Viswanathan–Ramamoorthy	A. Maruthakasi	S. C. Krishnan	
1959	Raja Malaiya Simman	Aattam Aadumbodhu Nottam Paarkkadhe	Viswanathan–Ramamoorthy	A. Maruthakasi	M. S. Viswanathan	
1959	Raja Sevai	Kaadai Kaudhaarigale Eppamidum Kaattu Poonai	T. V. Raju	Thanjai N. Ramaiah Dass	S. C. Krishnan	
1959	Raja Sevai	Paruva Kaalam Thavari Ponaal	T. V. Raju	Thanjai N. Ramaiah Dass		
1959	Thaai Magalukku Kattiya Thaali	AAadivarum Aadagap Porpaavai Adi Nee	T. R. Pappa	K. D. Santhanam	Seerkazhi Govindarajan	
1959	Uthami Petra Rathinam	Annan Manam Pole	T. Chalapathi Rao	Thanjai N. Ramaiah Dass		
1959	Uthami Petra Rathinam	Aadalum Paadalum	T. Chalapathi Rao	Thanjai N. Ramaiah Dass		

=== 1960s ===
Year	Film	Song	Music director	Writer	Co-singer	Note(s)
1960	Adutha Veettu Penn	Sayonara Tokyo	P. Adinarayana Rao	Thanjai N. Ramaiah Dass	P. B. Sreenivas	
1960	Deivapiravi	Anbale Thediya En	R. Sudarsanam	Udumalai Narayana Kavi	C. S. Jayaraman	
1960	Ivan Avanethan	Vaazhkaiyin Paadam Kooridum Odam	M. Ranga Rao	Villiputhan	Thiruchi Loganathan	
1960	Ivan Avanethan	Inba Yellai Kaanum Neram	M. Ranga Rao	Villiputhan	P. B. Sreenivas	
1960	Ivan Avanethan	Happy Jolly Good Day	M. Ranga Rao	M. S. Subramaniam		
1960	Ivan Avanethan	Maamuniye Maathavame	M. Ranga Rao	Kovai Sabapathy		
1960	Kuzhandhaigal Kanda Kudiyarasu	Azhagiya Thaamarai Kannaa	T. G. Lingappa	Ku. Ma. Balasubramaniam	A. P. Komala	
1960	Kuzhandhaigal Kanda Kudiyarasu	Sirikka Teriyumaa	T. G. Lingappa	Ku. Ma. Balasubramaniam		
1960	Meenda Sorgam	Singaara Thoppile	T. Chalapathi Rao		Jikki	
1960	Naan Kanda Sorgam	Ungal Azhagai Kanden	G. Aswathama		Seerkazhi Govindarajan	
1960	Naan Kanda Sorgam	Paar Paar Paar Saambaaru	G. Aswathama		Seerkazhi Govindarajan	
1960	Naan Kanda Sorgam	Ulagamellam Iradhadhu Pol	G. Aswathama		Seerkazhi Govindarajan	
1960	Naan Kanda Sorgam	Kizhavan Vadivodu Kaana Vandhaan	G. Aswathama			
1960	Naan Kanda Sorgam	Nee Yaaro Naan Yaaro	G. Aswathama		P. B. Sreenivas	
1960	Paadhai Theriyudhu Paar	Maasil Veenaiyum	M. B. Sreenivasan	Thevaram	A. S. Mahadevan	
1960	Paadhai Theriyudhu Paar	Thennangkeetru Oonjalile	M. B. Sreenivasan	Jayakanthan	P. B. Sreenivas	
1960	Patti Vikramathithan	Kaathali En Painkili	T. M. Ibrahim		S. C. Krishnan	
1960	Rathinapuri Ilavarasi	Padikka Padikka Nenjil Inikkum	Viswanathan–Ramamoorthy	Pattukkottai Kalyanasundaram	T. R. Mahalingam	
1960	Rathinapuri Ilavarasi	Paar Muzhuvathume Nam Per Paravume	Viswanathan–Ramamoorthy	Pattukkottai Kalyanasundaram		
1960	Then Nilavu	Oho Endhan Baby	A. M. Rajah	Kannadasan	A. M. Rajah	
1960	Then Nilavu	Kaalaiyum Neeye Maalaiyum Neeye	A. M. Rajah	Kannadasan	A. M. Rajah	
1960	Vijayapuri Veeran	Aasai Machchaan Visuvaasa Machchaan	T. R. Pappa		S. C. Krishnan	
1961	Anbu Magan	O Maappillai Machaan	T. Chalapathi Rao	A. S. Rajagopal	Seerkazhi Govindarajan	
1961	Arasilangkumari	Thaaraa Avar Varuvaaraa	G. Ramanathan	Ku. Ma. Balasubramaniam		
1961	Ennai Paar	Kaatchiyum Neethan Karpaniyum Neethan	T. G. Lingappa	A. Maruthakasi	T. R. Mahalingam	
1961	Ennai Paar	Edhirkondu Varaverkkudhe	T. G. Lingappa	A. Maruthakasi	T. R. Mahalingam	
1961	Ethaiyum Thangum Ithaiyam	Kannum Kannum Kalandhadhanaal Kaadhale	T. R. Pappa	Thanjai N. Ramaiah Dass	A. L. Raghavan	
1961	Ethaiyum Thangum Ithaiyam	Kannum Kannum Kalandhadhanaal Kaadhale	T. R. Pappa	Thanjai N. Ramaiah Dass	K. R. Ramasamy	
1961	Ethaiyum Thangum Ithaiyam	Ullam Thedaatdhe Endru Solludhe	T. R. Pappa	M. K. Athmanathan	K. R. Ramasamy	
1961	Ethaiyum Thangum Ithaiyam	Chinna Chinna Bommai	T. R. Pappa	A. Maruthakasi		
1961	Manapanthal	Mutthu Mutthu Pacharisi	Viswanathan–Ramamoorthy	Kannadasan	L. R. Eswari	
1961	Marutha Nattu Veeran		S. V. Venkatraman			
1961	Nallavan Vazhvan	Adichirukku Nallathoru Chansu	T. R. Pappa	M. K. Athamanathan	A. L. Raghavan	
1961	Panam Panthiyile	Enguminge Iyarkaiyin Kaadchi	K. V. Mahadevan	Ka. Mu. Sheriff	T. M. Soundararajan	
1961	Punar Jenmam	Manam Aadudhu Paadudhu	T. Chalapathi Rao	A. Maruthakasi	Jikki	
1961	Punar Jenmam	Naanillai Endral	T. Chalapathi Rao	Kannadasan	Seerkazhi Govindarajan & A. V. Saraswathi	
1962	Aalayamani	Thookkam Un Kanngalai	Viswanathan–Ramamoorthy	Kannadasan		
1962	Bandha Pasam	Panthal Irunthal Kodi Padarum	Viswanathan–Ramamoorthy	Kavi Rajagopal	T. M. Soundararajan	
1962	Bandha Pasam	En Kadhaithaan En Kadhaiyum	Viswanathan–Ramamoorthy	Kavi Rajagopal	P. Susheela	
1962	Deivathin Deivam	Kannan Mananilaiyai Thangame Thangam	G. Ramanathan	Mahakavi Bharathiyar		
1962	Deivathin Deivam	En Aaruyire Nal Vaanamuthe	G. Ramanathan	Ku. Ma. Balasubramaniam	P. B. Sreenivas	
1962	Deivathin Deivam	Annamey Sornamey	G. Ramanathan	A. Maruthakasi	P. Susheela	
1962	Ellorum Vazhavendum	Ponnu Ponnu Ponnu	Rajan–Nagendra	Muthukoothan		
1962	Konjum Salangai	Singaara Velane Dheva	S. M. Subbaiah Naidu	Ku. Ma. Balasubramaniam		
1962	Mahaveera Bheeman	Kaanbathellaam Kannan ... Thenoorum Malarile	M. S. Gnanamani	Navarasu		
1962	Mangaiyar Ullam Mangatha Selvam	Indha Vaalibamum Vaanaville	P. Adinarayana Rao	Thanjai N. Ramaiah Dass		
1962	Mangaiyar Ullam Mangatha Selvam	Sollaamalae Sollavaa	P. Adinarayana Rao	Thanjai N. Ramaiah Dass		
1962	Mangaiyar Ullam Mangatha Selvam	Mangala Medai Maalai Selvam	P. Adinarayana Rao	Kannadasan	P. Susheela	
1962	Paadha Kaanikkai	Poojaikku Vandha Malare Vaa	Viswanathan–Ramamoorthy	Kannadasan	P. B. Sreenivas	
1962	Paasam	Maalaiyum Iravum Sandhikkum Idatthil	Viswanathan–Ramamoorthy	Kannadasan	P. B. Sreenivas	
1962	Paasam	Jal Jal jal Enum Salangai Oli	Viswanathan–Ramamoorthy	Kannadasan		
1962	Policekaran Magal	Indha Mandrathil Odi Varum	Viswanathan–Ramamoorthy	Kannadasan	P. B. Sreenivas	
1962	Policekaran Magal	Indha Mandrathil Odi Varum (pathos)	Viswanathan–Ramamoorthy	Kannadasan	P. B. Sreenivas	
1962	Policekaran Magal	Aandondru Ponaaal Vayadhondru Pogum	Viswanathan–Ramamoorthy	Kannadasan	P. B. Sreenivas	
1962	Policekaran Magal	Pon Emben Siru Poo Emben	Viswanathan–Ramamoorthy	Kannadasan	P. B. Sreenivas	
1962	Policekaran Magal	Kannile Neer Edharkku	Viswanathan–Ramamoorthy	Kannadasan	Seerkazhi Govindarajan	
1962	Sengamala Theevu	Pakalil Pesum Nilavinai Kanden	K. V. Mahadevan	Chennai Ekalaivan	T. M. Soundararajan	
1962	Sengamala Theevu	Naan Onru Ninaithen Nadakkavillai	K. V. Mahadevan	Chennai Ekalaivan		
1962	Sumaithaangi	Endhan Paruvatthin Kelvikku	Viswanathan–Ramamoorthy	Kannadasan	P. B. Sreenivas	
1962	Sumaithaangi	O Maambazhatthu Vandu	Viswanathan–Ramamoorthy	Kannadasan	P. B. Sreenivas	
1962	Sumaithaangi	En Annai Seidha Paavam	Viswanathan–Ramamoorthy	Kannadasan		
1962	Sumaithaangi	Raadhaikketra Kannano Seedhaikketra Raamano	Viswanathan–Ramamoorthy	Kannadasan		
1962	Thendral Veesum	Sandhanatthil Niram Edutthu	Viswanathan–Ramamoorthy	Mayavanathan		
1962	Veerathirumagan	Paadaadha Paattellaam Paada Vandhaaal	Viswanathan–Ramamoorthy	Kannadasan	P. B. Sreenivas	
1963	Aayiram Kalathu Payir	Maamaa Pillai Maappillai	S. M. Subbaiah Naidu	Kannadasan	T. M. Soundararajan	
1963	Aayiram Kalathu Payir	Pattu Ponnu Pattukitta	S. M. Subbaiah Naidu	Kannadasan	T. M. Soundararajan	
1963	Aayiram Kalathu Payir	Katti Vaicha Poovum Vaadavillaiye	S. M. Subbaiah Naidu	Kannadasan		
1963	Chittoor Rani Padmini	Hum Tekaa Mele Shokkaa Aadum	G. Ramanathan	Thanjai Ramaiah Dass		
1963	Chittoor Rani Padmini	Aadal Paadal Kaanum Podhe	G. Ramanathan	Ku. Ma. Balasubramaniam		
1963	Kubera Theevu	Ilankanni Unnai Kaana Vandhaal	C. N. Pandurangan	Villiputhan		
1963	Kunkhumam	Chinnan Chiriya Vannaparavai	K. V. Mahadevan	Kannadasan	T. M. Soundararajan	
1963	Lava Kusa	Udhayam Aaanadhe Vennilaa	K. V. Mahadevan & Ghantasala	A. Maruthakasi		
1963	Mani Osai	Varusham Maasam Thedi	Viswanathan–Ramamoorthy	Kannadasan		
1963	Nenjam Marappathillai	Azhagukkum Malarukkum Jaadhi Illai	Viswanathan–Ramamoorthy	Kannadasan	P. B. Sreenivas	
1963	Punithavathi	Azhagile Ulagame Adakkamaiyaa	Hussein Reddy	Subbu Arumugam		
1963	Thulasi Maadam	Maiyai Thottu Ezhudhiyavar	K. V. Mahadevan	Thiruchi Thiyagarajan	Soolamangalam Rajalakshmi	
1963	Thulasi Maadam	Kalyaana Saappaadu Podum	K. V. Mahadevan	Thiruchi Thiyagarajan		
1963	Thulasi Maadam	Ammaadiyo Atthaanukku Kovattha Paaru	K. V. Mahadevan	Ka. Mu. Sheriff		
1964	Aayiram Roobai	Amma Illae Appa Illae	K. V. Mahadevan	Vaali		
1964	Arunagirinathar	Aadavendum Mayile	G. Ramanathan & T. R. Pappa	T. K. Krishnasamy	T. M. Soundararajan	
1964	Karuppu Panam	Iraivaa Iraivaa.... Undhan Raajasabai	Viswanathan–Ramamoorthy	Kannadasan		
1964	Naanum Manithan Thaan	Vaa Vaa Vaa En Thalaiva	G. K. Venkatesh	Thiruchi Thiyagarajan	T. A. Mothi	
1964	Naanum Manithan Thaan	Kaatru Varum Kaalamondru	G. K. Venkatesh		P. B. Sreenivas	
1964	Poompuhar	Ennai Mudhal Mudhalaaga	R. Sudarsanam	Radha Manikam	T. M. Soundararajan	
1964	Poompuhar	Ponnaal Idhupole Varumaa	R. Sudarsanam	Udumalai Narayana Kavi	T. M. Soundararajan	
1964	Rishyasringar	Vinnaalum Sundhara Roobam	T. V. Raju		Ghantasala	
1964	Rishyasringar	Hari Hari Hari Hari Om	T. V. Raju			
1964	Thozhilali	Azhagan Azhagan	K. V. Mahadevan	Mayavanathan	P. Susheela	
1964	Veera Pandiyan	Sanga Thamizhe.... Malarum Paruvam Kadhai Sollumaa	Rajan–Nagendra		Thiruchi Loganathan	
1964	Veera Pandiyan	Neengaddha Ninaivaagum.... Kanavo Andru Naan Kanda	Rajan–Nagendra		T. M. Soundararajan	
1964	Veeraadhi Veeran	Innum Innum Idhui	Rajan–Nagendra		T. M. Soundararajan	
1964	Veeraadhi Veeran	Amaidhi Kollaamal	Rajan–Nagendra		L. R. Eswari	
1965	Idhaya Kamalam	Melathai Mella Thattu Mama	K. V. Mahadevan	Kannadasan		
1965	Kalyana Mandapam	En Pillai Mugam Therigiradhu	R. Parthasarathy	Vaali		
1965	Panam Tharum Parisu	Paruvam Mutti Pazhagum	Shankar–Ganesh		K. J. Yesudas	
1965	Poojaikku Vandha Malar	Thingalukku Enna Indru Thirumanamo	Viswanathan–Ramamoorthy	Mayavanathan	A. L. Raghavan	
1965	Thayin Karunai	Netru Nadanthathu	G. K. Venkatesh		A. L. Raghavan	
1965	Thayin Karunai	Chinna Chinna Kovil	G. K. Venkatesh	Mayavanathan	A. P. Komala	
1965	Thayin Karunai	Poonthendral Isaipaada	G. K. Venkatesh	Mayavanathan		
1965	Thayin Karunai	Singaaram Edherkendru Sollavaa	G. K. Venkatesh		A. P. Komala	
1965	Thiruvilaiyadal	Podhigai Malai Uchiyile	K. V. Mahadevan	Kannadasan	P. B. Sreenivas	
1965	Veera Abhimanyu	Kallathaname Uruvaai Vandha	K. V. Mahadevan	Kannadasan		
1965	Vennira Aadai	Chithirame Nilladi	Viswanathan–Ramamoorthy	Kannadasan	P. B. Sreenivas	
1966	Kathal Paduthum Padu	Kanngal Irandil Yaaradi Vandhaar	T. R. Pappa	M. K. Athmanathan	P. Susheela	
1966	Namma Veettu Lakshmi	Vayadhaana Podhum	M. S. Viswanathan	Kannadasan		
1967	Bhakta Prahlada	Vaazhgave Mannulagum Vinnulagum	S. Rajeswara Rao	V. Seetharaman	P. Susheela & Soolamangalam Rajalakshmi	
1967	Bhakta Prahlada	Devi Devi Thaaye	S. Rajeswara Rao	Ku. Ma. Balasubramaniam		
1967	Bhakta Prahlada	Hey Jothi Swaroopa	S. Rajeswara Rao	Ku. Ma. Balasubramaniam	P. Susheela	
1967	Bhakta Prahlada	Chinna Chinna Kanne	S. Rajeswara Rao	Thiruchi Thiyagarajan	M. Balamuralikrishna	
1967	Kandhan Karunai	Aarumugamana Porul	K. V. Mahadevan	Kannadasan	Soolamangalam Rajalakshmi & Renuka	
1967	Nenjirukkum Varai	Ninaithal Podhum Aaduven	M. S. Viswanathan	Kannadasan		
1967	Pesum Dheivam	Pillai Selvame	K. V. Mahadevan	Vaali		
1968	Poovum Pottum	Ellorum Kandadhu Engal	R. Govarthanam			
1969	Adimai Penn	Kaalatthai Vendravan Nee	K. V. Mahadevan	Avinashi Mani	P. Susheela	
1969	Annaiyum Pithavum	Modhiram Pottadhu Pol	M. S. Viswanathan	Kannadasan		
1969	Kanni Penn	Pournami Nilavil	M. S. Viswanathan		S. P. Balasubrahmanyam	
1969	Kuzhandai Ullam	"Poomarathu Nizhalumundu"	S. P. Kodandapani	Kannadasan	P. Susheela	

=== 1970s ===
Year	Film	Song	Music director	Writer	Co-singer	Note
1970	Sorgam	Azhagu Mugam Pazhagu Sugam	M. S. Viswanathan	Kannadasan	Jikki	
1970	En Annan	Neela Niram	K. V. Mahadevan	Kannadasan	T. M. Soundararajan	
1970	Engirundho Vandhaal	Vandavargal Vaazhga	M. S. Viswanathan	Kannadasan		
1970	Jeevanadi	Kannagarunkuyil Chinna Ilamayil	V. Dakshinamoorthy		K. J. Yesudas	
1970	Kanmalar	Paamalai Avar Padikka	K. V. Mahadevan	Vaali	M. Balamuralikrishna	
1970	Kalyana Oorvalam	Koondhalile Nei Thadavi	R. Parthasarathy		K. J. Yesudas	
1970	Namma Kuzhandaigal	Radhayai	M. S. Viswanathan	Kannadasan		
1970	Vilaiyaattu Pillai	Sollaamal Theriya Vendume	K. V. Mahadevan	Kannadasan		
1971	Aathi Parasakthi	Azhagaaga Kannukku	K. V. Mahadevan	Kannadasan		
1971	Avalukendru Or Manam	Unnidathil Ennai Koduthen	M. S. Viswanathan	Kannadasan		
1971	Avalukendru Or Manam	Deviyin Kovil Paravai	M. S. Viswanathan	Kannadasan		
1971	Babu	Idho Endhan Deivam	M. S. Viswanathan	Vaali	T. M. Soundararajan	
1971	Kulama Gunama	Maathuru Ramakka	K. V. Mahadevan	Kannadasan	P. Susheela	
1971	Kulama Gunama	Ulagil Irandu Kiligal	K. V. Mahadevan	Kannadasan	S. P. Balasubrahmanyam, T. M. Soundararajan, P. Susheela	
1971	Thenum Paalum	Manjalum Thanthaal	M. S. Viswanathan	Kannadasan	Jikki	
1971	Neerum Neruppum	Konduva Innum	M. S. Viswanathan	Vaali		
1971	Pudhiya Vazhkai	Kaalam Ennodu Varum	K. V. Mahadevan	Kannadasan		
1971	Pudhiya Vazhkai	Paada Therinthavar	K. V. Mahadevan	Kannadasan		
1971	Pudhiya Vazhkai	Vilakkil Ethiroliye	K. V. Mahadevan	Kannadasan		
1971	Punnagai	Aanaiyitten Nerungaathe	M. S. Viswanathan	Kannadasan		
1971	Sabatham	Aadum Alaigalil	G. K. Venkatesh	Kannadasan		
1971	Sudarum Sooravaliyum	Muthumani Kannanukku	M. S. Viswanathan	Kannadasan		
1971	Thangaikkaaga	Unnai Thedivarum	M. S. Viswanathan	Kannadasan	T. M. Soundararajan	
1972	Annamitta Kai	Azhagukku	K. V. Mahadevan	Vaali	T. M. Soundararajan	
1972	Dharmam Engey	Naangu Kaalamum	M. S. Viswanathan	Kannadasan	L. R. Eswari	
1972	Dhikku Theriyadha Kaattil	Kuliradikkuthey	M. S. Viswanathan	Vaali	S. P. Balasubrahmanyam, L. R. Eswari, M. L. Srikanth	
1972	Idhaya Veenai	Aanandam Indru	Shankar–Ganesh	Vaali	T. M. Soundararajan	
1972	Naan Yen Pirandhen	Thalai Vaazhai Ilai	Shankar–Ganesh	Vaali	Jikki	
1972	Thiruneelakandar	Kaalayil Naan Oru Kanavu	C. N. Pandurangan	Kannadasan		
1972	Thiruneelakandar	Bantha Paasa Kattukkulle	C. N. Pandurangan	Kannadasan	T. R. Mahalingam	
1973	Alaigal	"Oomai Pennai"	M. S. Viswanathan	Kannadasan	solo	
1973	Baghdad Perazhagi	Nawabukku Oru Kelvi	M. S. Viswanathan	Pulamaipithan	S. P. Balasubrahmanyam	
1973	Baghdad Perazhagi	Naan Kuduchu	M. S. Viswanathan	Pulamaipithan	L. R. Eswari	
1973	Ganga Gowri	Azhagiya Meghangal	M. S. Viswanathan	Kannadasan		
1973	Ganga Gowri	Antharangam Naan Ariven	M. S. Viswanathan	Kannadasan	M. Balamuralikrishna	
1973	Ganga Gowri	Aadhi Nathan Ketkindren	M. S. Viswanathan	Kannadasan	T. M. Soundararajan	
1973	Ganga Gowri	Adi Yendiyamma	M. S. Viswanathan	Kannadasan	L. R. Eswari	
1973	Manipayal	Naan Aadinaal Oru Vagai	M. S. Viswanathan	Vaali		
1973	Ulagam Sutrum Valiban	Ulagam Ulagam	M. S. Viswanathan	Kannadasan	T. M. Soundararajan	
1973	Pattikaattu Ponnaiya	Iravugalai Paatha	K. V. Mahadevan	Kannadasan	S. P. Balasubrahmanyam	
1973	Ponnunjal	Varuvan Mogana	M. S. Viswanathan	Kannadasan		
1973	Ponnukku Thanga Manasu	Thaen Sindhuthey Vaanam	G. K. Venkatesh	Kannadasan	S. P. Balasubrahmanyam	
1973	Ponnukku Thanga Manasu	Thanjavoor Seemayile	G. K. Venkatesh	Muthulingam	Sirkazhi Govindarajan	
1973	Pookkari	Kadhalin Pon Veedhiyil	M. S. Viswanathan	Panchu Arunachalam	T. M. Soundararajan	
1973	Sollathaan Ninaikkiren	Pallavi Endru	M.S. Viswanathan	Vaali	P. Susheela	
1973	Sollathaan Ninaikkiren	Sollathaan Ninaikkiren	M.S. Viswanathan	Vaali	M. S. Viswanathan	
1974	Aval Oru Thodar Kathai	Kannilae Enna Undu	M.S. Viswanathan	Kannadasan		
1974	Kalyanamam Kalyanam	Ilamai Naattiya	Vijaya Bhaskar	Panchu Arunachalam	T. M. Soundararajan	
1974	Maanikka Thottil	Samaththana Maapillai	M. S. Viswanathan	Kannadasan	L. R. Eswari	
1974	Netru Indru Naalai	Ange Varuvadhu	M. S. Viswanathan	Avinasi Mani	S. P. Balasubrahmanyam	
1974	Sirithu Vazha Vendum	Konja Neram Ennai	M. S. Viswanathan	Vaali	T. M. Soundararajan	
1974	Vani Rani	Pon Olirum	K. V. Mahadevan	Kannadasan	T. M. Soundararajan	
1975	Dr. Siva	Malarae Kurinji Malarae	M. S. Viswanathan	Vaali	K. J. Yesudas	
1975	Idhayakkani	Neenga Nalla Irukkanum	M. S. Viswanathan	Pulamaipithan	T. M. Soundararajan, Seerkazhi Govindarajan	
1975	Pattampoochi	Ethanai Malargal	P. Sreenivasan	Kannadasan	T. M. Soundararajan	
1975	Pattampoochi	Pasi Edukkum Neram	P. Sreenivasan	Pulamaipithan	S. P. Balasubrahmanyam	
1975	Yarukkum Vetkam Illai	En Kann Irandum	G. K. Venkatesh	Pulamaipithan		
1976	Annakili	Annakili Unnai Theduthe	Ilaiyaraaja	Panchu Arunachalam		
1976	Annakili	Machaana Pathingala	Ilaiyaraaja	Panchu Arunachalam		
1976	Annakili	Muththu Muththa	Ilaiyaraaja	Panchu Arunachalam	Chorus	
1976	Bhadrakali	Ottha Rooba	Ilaiyaraaja	Vaali	Malaysia Vasudevan	
1976	Unarchigal	Nenjathil Poradum	Shyam	Kannadasan	S. P. Balasubrahmanyam	
1976	Unarchigal	Alainthaadum Naan	Shyam	Muthulingam	P. Susheela	
1976	Idhayakkani	Neenga Nalla Irukkanum	M. S. Viswanathan	Pulamaipithan	T. M. Soundararajan, Seerkazhi Govindarajan	
1977	16 Vayathinile	Manjakkulichi	Ilaiyaraaja	Alangudi Somu		
1977	16 Vayathinile	Chendoora Poove	Ilaiyaraaja	Gangai Amaran		
1977	16 Vayathinile	Aattukkutti	Ilaiyaraaja	Kannadasan	Malaysia Vasudevan	
1977	Aalukkoru Aasai	Vaazhvennum Sorgathil	Ilaiyaraaja	Pulamaipithan		
1977	Aasai Manaivi	Varalamo	Shankar–Ganesh	A. Maruthakasi		
1977	Avargal	Gangaiyile Neer	M. S. Viswanathan	Kannadasan		
1977	Avargal	Ippadiyor Thalaattu	M. S. Viswanathan	Kannadasan		
1977	Avargal	Kaattrukkenna Veli	M. S. Viswanathan	Kannadasan		
1977	Bhuvana Oru Kelvi Kuri	Raja Embaar	Ilaiyaraaja	Panchu Arunachalam	S. P. Balasubrahmanyam	
1977	Chakravarthy	En Ooru Mysore	V. Kumar	Kannadasan	T. M. Soundararajan	
1977	Dheepam	Poovizhi Vaasalil	Ilaiyaraaja	Pulamaipithan	K. J. Yesudas	
1977	Dheepam	Anthapurathil Oru	Ilaiyaraaja	Pulamaipithan		
1977	Durga Devi	Devi Senthoora	Ilaiyaraaja	Kannadasan	Malaysia Vasudevan	
1977	Gaayathri	Unnai Thaan	Ilaiyaraaja	Panchu Arunachalam	A. L. Raghavan	
1977	Kavikkuyil	Chinna Kannan Azhaikkiran	Ilaiyaraaja	Panchu Arunachalam		
1977	Kavikkuyil	Kuyile Kavikkuyile	Ilaiyaraaja	Panchu Arunachalam		
1977	Kavikkuyil	Udhayam Varugindrathe	Ilaiyaraaja	Panchu Arunachalam	G. K. Venkatesh	
1977	Thunai Iruppal Meenakshi	Setril Oru Sengazhan	Ilaiyaraaja	Pulamaipithan	T. M. Soundararajan	
1978	Achchani	Maatha Un Kovilil	Ilaiyaraaja	Gangai Amaran		
1978	Aval Appadithan	Vazhkkai Odam	Ilaiyaraaja	Kannadasan		
1978	Aayiram Jenmangal	Venmeghame	M. S. Viswanathan	Kannadasan		
1978	Aayiram Jenmangal	Azhaikkindren	M. S. Viswanathan	Kannadasan		
1978	Aayiram Jenmangal	Arupathunaangu Kalaigal	M. S. Viswanathan	Kannadasan		
1978	Aayiram Jenmangal	Venmeghame (bit)	M. S. Viswanathan	Kannadasan		
1978	Bairavi	Kattapulle	Ilaiyaraaja	Kannadasan	T. M. Soundararajan	
1978	Bairavi	Oru Padhiyil	Ilaiyaraaja	Kannadasan		
1978	Bairavi	Yezhukadal Nayakiye	Ilaiyaraaja	Kannadasan		
1978	Ilamai Oonjal Aadukirathu	Kinnatthil Thaen	Ilaiyaraaja	Vaali	K. J. Yesudas	
1978	Kaatrinile Varum Geetham	Kandane Engum	Ilaiyaraaja	Panchu Arunachalam		
1978	Kaatrinile Varum Geetham	Oru Vanavil Pole	Ilaiyaraaja	Panchu Arunachalam	P. Jayachandran	
1978	Kizhakke Pogum Rail	Poovarasam Poo	Ilaiyaraaja	Gangai Amaran		
1978	Kizhakke Pogum Rail	Kovil Mani Osai	Ilaiyaraaja	Kannadasan	Malaysia Vasudevan	
1978	Kizhakke Pogum Rail	Malargale	Ilaiyaraaja	Sirpi Balasubramaniam	Malaysia Vasudevan	
1978	Mangudi Minor	Unnidam Solven	Composer	Vaali	T. M. Soundararajan	
1978	Manidharil Ithanai Nirangala!	Ponne Boomiyadi	Shyam	Kannadasan	Vani Jairam	
1978	Paruva Mazhai	Then Malar Kannigal	Salil Choudhary	Kannadasan		
1978	Paruva Mazhai	Ange Senkathir	Salil Choudhary	Kannadasan		
1978	Priya	Ye Paadal Ondru	Ilaiyaraaja	Panchu Arunachalam	K. J. Yesudas	
1978	Sadhurangam	Aarambam	V. Kumar	Vaali	L. R. Eswari	
1978	Sattam En Kaiyil	Aazhakadalil	Ilaiyaraaja	Kannadasan	Malaysia Vasudevan	
1978	Shankar Salim Simon	Sindhu Nadhi Poovey	M. S. Viswanathan	Kannadasan	M. S. Viswanathan	
1978	Sigappu Rojakkal	Ninaivo Oru Paravai	Ilaiyaraaja	Vaali	Kamal Haasan	
1978	Sigappu Rojakkal	Indha Minminikku	Ilaiyaraaja	Kannadasan	Malaysia Vasudevan	
1978	Taxi Driver	Sughamana Sindhanayil	M. S. Viswanathan	Vaali	S. P. Balasubrahmanyam	
1978	Tripura Sundari	Vannatthu Poongili	Ilaiyaraaja	Kannadasan	Jency Anthony	
1978	Vattathukkul Chaduram	Idho Idho En Nenjile	Ilaiyaraaja	Panchu Arunachalam	B. S. Sasirekha, Uma Devi	
1978	Vattathukkul Chaduram	Perazhagu Meni	Ilaiyaraaja	Panchu Arunachalam		
1979	Aarilirunthu Arubathu Varai	Kanmaniye Kadhal Embathu	Ilaiyaraaja	Panchu Arunachalam	S. P. Balasubrahmanyam	
1979	Agal Vilakku	Maalai Nera	Ilaiyaraaja	Gangai Amaran		
1979	Azhiyatha Kolangal	Kedacha Unakku	Salil Chowdhury	Gangai Amaran		
1979	Dharma Yuddham	Aagaya Gangai	Ilaiyaraaja	Kannadasan	Malaysia Vasudevan	
1979	Inikkum Ilamai	Maana Madhurayile	Shankar–Ganesh	Alangudi Somu	T. M. Soundararajan	
1979	Iru Nilavugal	"Thoda Varavo Thontharavo"	Rajan–Nagendra	Vaali	S. P. Balasubrahmanyam	
1979	Iru Nilavugal	"Ammadi Kannaippaaru"	Rajan–Nagendra	Vaali	S. P. Balasubrahmanyam	
1979	Kalyanaraman	Ninaithal Inikkum	Ilaiyaraaja	Panchu Arunachalam		
1979	Kanni Paruvathile	Adi Ammadi	Shankar–Ganesh	Pulamaipithan		
1979	Kanni Paruvathile	Aavaram Poomani	Shankar–Ganesh	Nethaji		
1979	Kanni Paruvathile	Pattuvanna	Shankar–Ganesh	Muthubharathi		
1979	Kavari Maan	Aaduthu Ullam	Ilaiyaraaja	Panchu Arunachalam		
1979	Kuppathu Raja	Puli Varuthu	M. S. Viswanathan	Kannadasan	Malaysia Vasudevan	
1979	Mangala Vaathiyam	Sorgam Therikiradhu	M. S. Viswanathan	Kannadasan		
1979	Mangala Vaathiyam	Thulli Varum Kaalai	M. S. Viswanathan	Kannadasan	Malaysia Vasudevan	
1979	Neela Malargal	Andhaga Ooril Oru Raja	M. S. Viswanathan	Kannadasan		
1979	Neeya?	Oru Kodi	Shankar–Ganesh	Kannadasan	S. P. Balasubrahmanyam	
1979	Ninaithale Inikkum	Ninaithaale Inikkum	M. S. Viswanathan	Kannadasan	S. P. Balasubrahmanyam	
1979	Niram Maaratha Pookkal	Mudhal Mudhalaaga	Ilaiyaraaja	Kannadasan	S. P. Balasubrahmanyam	
1979	Oru Vidukadhai Oru Thodarkadhai	Naayagan Avan	Gangai Amaran	Vaali	K. J. Yesudas	
1979	Oru Vidukadhai Oru Thodarkadhai	Radha Radha Nee Engae	Gangai Amaran	Gangai Amaran	S. P. Balasubrahmanyam	
1979	Pagalil Oru Iravu	Thaamtha Theemtha Aadum	Ilaiyaraaja	Kannadasan		
1979	Pattakkathi Bhairavan	Boot Polish	Ilaiyaraaja	Kannadasan	P. Susheela	
1979	Pattakkathi Bhairavan	Nenjukkulle Singakutti	Ilaiyaraaja	Kannadasan	P. Susheela	
1979	Pattakkathi Bhairavan	Devathai Oru Devathai	Ilaiyaraaja	Kannadasan	S. P. Balasubrahmanyam	
1979	Pattakkathi Bhairavan	Yengengo Sellum	Ilaiyaraaja	Kannadasan	S. P. Balasubrahmanyam	
1979	Puthiya Vaarpugal	Vaan Meghangale	Ilaiyaraaja	Kannadasan	Malaysia Vasudevan	
1979	Chakkalathi	Chinna Chinna Paathi Katti	Ilaiyaraaja	Pulamaipithan	B. S. Sasirekha	
1979	Suvarilladha Chiththirangal	Kadhal Vaibhogame	Gangai Amaran	Kannadasan	Malaysia Vasudevan	
1979	Thisai Maariya Paravaigal	Raja Vaada Singakutti	M. S. Viswanathan	Kannadasan	P. Jayachandran	
1979	Uthiripookkal	Azhagiya Kanne	Ilaiyaraaja	Kannadasan		
1979	Uthiripookkal	Naan Paada	Ilaiyaraaja		M. G. Vallabhan	
1979	Uthiripookkal	Poda Poda	Ilaiyaraaja		Muthulingam	
1979	Vetrikku Oruvan	Thoranam Aadidum	Ilaiyaraaja	Panchu Arunachalam	T. M. Soundararajan	
1979	Vetrikku Oruvan	Yaar Maamano	Ilaiyaraaja	Panchu Arunachalam		
1979	Veettukku Veedu Vasappadi	Patta Kashtam	Rajan–Nagendra		Suruli Rajan & Manorama	

=== 1980s ===
==== 1980 ====
Film	Song	Music director	Writer	Co-singer	Notes
Aayiram Vaasal Idhayam	"Maharani Unnai Thedi"	Ilaiyaraaja	Pulamaipithan	P. Jayachandran	
Rishi Moolam	"Mazhai Varuvathu"	Ilaiyaraaja	Kannadasan		
Ellam Un Kairasi	"Cherikku Sevai"	Ilaiyaraaja	Gangai Amaran	S. P. Balasubrahmanyam, S. P. Sailaja	
Enga Ooru Rasathi	"Asapattu Paatha"	Gangai Amaran	Vaali		
Gramathu Athiyayam	"Ootha Kaatthu"	Ilaiyaraaja	Gangai Amaran	P. Jayachandran	
Gramathu Athiyayam	"Aatthu Mettuley"	Ilaiyaraaja	Gangai Amaran	Malaysia Vasudevan	
Guru	"Parandhaalum Vidamatten"	Ilaiyaraaja	Kannadasan	S. P. Balasubrahmanyam	
Guru	"Perai Chollava"	Ilaiyaraaja	Kannadasan	S. P. Balasubrahmanyam	
Guru	"Endhan Kannil"	Ilaiyaraaja	Kannadasan		
Guru	"Maamanukku Paramakkudi"	Ilaiyaraaja	Gangai Amaran		
Guru	"Naan Vanangugiren"	Ilaiyaraaja	Panchu Arunachalam		
Idhayaththil Ore Idam	"Kaalangal Mazhai Kaalangal"	Ilaiyaraaja	Pulamaipithan	Malaysia Vasudevan	
Ilamai Kolam	"Kannan Naalai"	Ilaiyaraaja	Gangai Amaran		
Johnny	"Kaatril Enthan Geetham"	Ilaiyaraaja	Gangai Amaran		
Kaali	"Bhathrakali Utthama"	Ilaiyaraaja	Vairamuthu	S. P. Balasubrahmanyam	
Kallukkul Eeram	"Endhan Kairasi Parum"	Ilaiyaraaja	Gangai Amaran		
Kallukkul Eeram	"Ennatthil Yedho"	Ilaiyaraaja	Gangai Amaran		
Kallukkul Eeram	"Koththamalli Poove"	Ilaiyaraaja	Gangai Amaran	Malaysia Vasudevan	
Kallukkul Eeram	"Siru Ponmani"	Ilaiyaraaja	Gangai Amaran	Ilaiyaraaja, Malaysia Vasudevan	
Kannil Theriyum Kathaikal	"Naan Oru Ponnoviyam"	Ilaiyaraaja	Pulamaipithan	S. P. Balasubrahmanyam, P. Susheela	
Kumari Pennin Ullathile	"Madhukkadalo Maragadha"	Shankar–Ganesh	Pulamaipithan	P. Jayachandran	
Kumari Pennin Ullathile	"Oh Ammani Akka"	Shankar–Ganesh	Pulamaipithan		
Maria My Darling	"Vaanga Naina"	Shankar–Ganesh	Kannadasan		
Maria My Darling	"Unnaithan Enni"	Shankar–Ganesh	Kannadasan		
Moodu Pani	"Paruva Kaalangalin"	Ilaiyaraaja	Gangai Amaran	Malaysia Vasudevan	
Murattu Kaalai	"Entha Poovilum"	Ilaiyaraaja	Panchu Arunachalam		
Murattu Kaalai	"Puthu Vannangal"	Ilaiyaraaja	Panchu Arunachalam		
Natchathiram	"Vaigai Nathiyil Oru"	Shankar–Ganesh	Pulamaipithan		
Nenjathai Killathe	"Paruvame Puthiya Paadal Paadu"	Ilaiyaraaja	Panchu Arunachalam	S. P. Balasubrahmanyam	
Nenjathai Killathe	"Uravenum"	Ilaiyaraaja	Gangai Amaran	S. P. Balasubrahmanyam	
Nenjathai Killathe	"Mummy Peru Maari"	Ilaiyaraaja	Gangai Amaran	Vennira Aadai Moorthy	
Nizhalgal	"Doorathil Naan Kanda"	Ilaiyaraaja	Panchu Arunachalam		
Oru Kai Osai	"Naan Neerodayil"	M. S. Viswanathan	Muthulingam		
Poottaatha Poottukkal	"Vanna Vanna Poove"	Ilaiyaraaja	Panchu Arunachalam		
Poottaatha Poottukkal	"Anandam Anandam"	Ilaiyaraaja	Panchu Arunachalam		
Poottaatha Poottukkal	"Andipatti"	Ilaiyaraaja	Panchu Arunachalam		
Poottaatha Poottukkal	"Nenjukkulle"	Ilaiyaraaja	Panchu Arunachalam		
Ratha Paasam	"Aasai Theera"	M. S. Viswanathan	Kannadasan	S. P. Balasubrahmanyam	
Rusi Kanda Poonai	"Kanna Nee Engey"	Ilaiyaraaja	Panchu Arunachalam		
Rusi Kanda Poonai	"En Nenjam"	Ilaiyaraaja	Panchu Arunachalam		
Uchakattam	"Ithazhil"	Shankar–Ganesh	Vaali	Malaysia Vasudevan	
Ullasa Paravaigal	"Azhagiya Malargalin"	Ilaiyaraaja	Panchu Arunachalam		
Ullasa Paravaigal	"Azhagu Aayiram"	Ilaiyaraaja	Panchu Arunachalam		
Ullasa Paravaigal	"Naan Undhan Thaayaaga"	Ilaiyaraaja	Panchu Arunachalam		
Ullasa Paravaigal	"Germanyin Senthaen Malare"	Ilaiyaraaja	Panchu Arunachalam	S. P. Balasubrahmanyam	
Vandichakkaram	"Oru Thai Maasam"	Shankar–Ganesh	Pulamaipithan		
Varumayin Niram Sivappu	"Sippi Irukkuthu"	M. S. Viswanathan	Kannadasan	S. P. Balasubrahmanyam	
Varumayin Niram Sivappu	"Tu Hai Raja"	M. S. Viswanathan	P. B. Srinivas		
Doorathu Idi Muzhakkam	"Ullam Ellam Thalladuthe"	Salil Chowdhury	Ku. Ma. Balasubramaniam	K. J. Yesudas	
Doorathu Idi Muzhakkam	"Ullam Ellam Thalladuthe"	Salil Chowdhury	Ku. Ma. Balasubramaniam	P. Jayachandran	

==== 1981 ====
Film	Song	Music director	Writer	Co-singer
Alaigal Oivathillai	"Aayiram Thamarai"	Ilaiyaraaja	Vairamuthu	S. P. Balasubrahmanyam
Alaigal Oivathillai	"Darisanam Kidaikatha" (Female)	Ilaiyaraaja	Vairamuthu	solo
Alaigal Oivathillai	"Putham Pudhu Kaalai"	Ilaiyaraaja	Gangai Amaran	solo
Alaigal Oivathillai	"Lambodhara"	Ilaiyaraaja	Ilaiyaraaja	solo
Alaigal Oivathillai	"Sa Ri Ga Ma Pa"	Ilaiyaraaja	Ilaiyaraaja	Guruvayoor Rajam
Alaigal Oivathillai	"Vaazhvellam Aanandame"	Ilaiyaraaja	Ilaiyaraaja	Ilaiyaraaja
Amara Kaaviyam	"Than Vanathai"	M. S. Viswanathan	Kannadasan	
Andhi Mayakkam	"Aatha Vandhen"	Shyam	Vairamuthu	
Andha 7 Naatkal	"Kavithai Arangerum"	M. S. Viswanathan	Kuruvikkarambai Shanmugham	P. Jayachandran
Andha 7 Naatkal	"Sapthaswara"	M. S. Viswanathan	Kannadasan	P. Jayachandran
Bala Nagamma	"Neer Kodukka"	Ilaiyaraaja	Pulamaipithan	P. Susheela
Chinna Mul Peria Mul	"Iravinil Oru Poonguyil"	Shankar–Ganesh	Vaali	
Chinna Mul Peria Mul	"Iru Vizhigal"	Shankar–Ganesh	Vaali	P. Jayachandran
Ellam Inba Mayyam	"Onnum Onnum Rendu"	Ilaiyaraaja	Panju Arunachalam	Ilaiyaraaja
Enakkaga Kaathiru	"Oh Nenjame"	Ilaiyaraaja	Gangai Amaran	Deepan Chakravarthy
Enga Ooru Kannagi	"Pachaivayal"	M. S. Viswanathan	Pulamaipithan	
Garjanai	"Vanthathu Nallathu"	Ilaiyaraaja	Kannadasan	S. P. Balasubrahmanyam
Garjanai	"Varuvai Anbe"	Ilaiyaraaja	Panchu Arunachalam	T. K. S. Kalaivanan
Kadal Meengal	"Thaalaattude Vaanam"	Ilaiyaraaja	Kannadasan	P. Jayachandran
Kanni Theevu	"Ithu Oru Puthu Vitha"	Ilaiyaraaja	Panchu Arunachalam	
Kanni Theevu	"Ponnana Neram"	Ilaiyaraaja	Panchu Arunachalam	
Lorry Driver Rajakannu	"Vetkappadavo"	M. S. Viswanathan	Vaali	S. P. Balasubrahmanyam
Lorry Driver Rajakannu	"Singara Ponnoda Selaiyil"	M. S. Viswanathan	Kannadasan	S. P. Balasubrahmanyam

==== 1982 ====
Film	Song	Music director	Writer	Co-singer
Auto Raja	"Sangathil Padatha"	Ilaiyaraaja	Pulamaipithan	Ilaiyaraaja
Auto Raja	"Kattilarai"	Shankar–Ganesh	Pulamaipithan	solo
Moondru Mugam	"Yethanaiyo"	Shankar–Ganesh	Vaali, Muthulingam	Malaysia Vasudevan
Antha Rathirikku Satchi Illai	"Mani Osaiyum"	K. V. Mahadevan	Pulamaipithan	S. P. Balasubrahmanyam
Thanikattu Raja	"Naan Thaan Taapu"	Ilaiyaraaja	Vaali	S. P. Balasubrahmanyam
Thanikattu Raja	"Santhana Kaatre"	Ilaiyaraaja	Vaali	S. P. Balasubrahmanyam
Thanikattu Raja	"Mullai Arumbe"	Ilaiyaraaja	Panchu Arunachalam	Malaysia Vasudevan

==== 1983 ====
Film	Song	Music director	Writer	Co-singer	Note(s)
Paayum Puli	"Aadi Maasa Kaathadikka"	Ilaiyaraaja	Vaali	S. P. Balasubrahmanyam	
Paayum Puli	"Vaa Vaa Maama"	Ilaiyaraaja	Vaali	solo	
Mann Vasanai	"Poththi Vachcha" (Duet)	Ilaiyaraaja	Vairamuthu	S. P. Balasubrahmanyam	
Mann Vasanai	"Pothi Vacha" (Sad)	Ilaiyaraaja	Vairamuthu	solo	
Mann Vasanai	"Anantha Thenn"	Ilaiyaraaja	Vairamuthu	Panchu Arunachalam	Malaysia Vasudevan
Thai Veedu	"Aasai Nenje"	Shankar–Ganesh	Vaali	solo	
Thai Veedu	"Mama Mama En Paarthe"	Shankar–Ganesh	Vaali	S. P. Balasubrahmanyam, K. J. Yesudas	
Thai Veedu	"Unnai Azhaithathu"	Shankar–Ganesh	Vaali	S. P. Balasubrahmanyam	
Thai Veedu	"Ival Oru Sundari"	Shankar–Ganesh	Vaali	S. P. Balasubrahmanyam	

==== 1984 ====
Year	Film	Music director	Writer	Co-singer
Achamillai Achamillai	"Pudhiru Poda"	V. S. Narasimhan	Vairamuthu	Malaysia Vasudevan
Anbulla Rajinikanth	"Then Poove"	Ilaiyaraaja	Vaali	S. P. Balasubrahmanyam
Nooravathu Naal	"Vizhiyile Mani"	Ilaiyaraaja	Pulamaipithan	S. P. Balasubrahmanyam
Thambikku Entha Ooru	"Kalyana Mela Saththam"	Ilaiyaraaja	Panchu Arunachalam	solo
Thambikku Entha Ooru	"Kaathalin Deepam Ondru" (female)	Ilaiyaraaja	Panchu Arunachalam	solo
Unnai Naan Santhithen	"Thaalaatu Maari" (female)	Ilaiyaraaja	Vairamuthu	solo
Unnai Naan Santhithen	"Devan Thantha Veenai"	Ilaiyaraaja	Kannadasan	P. Jayachandran
Vaidehi Kathirunthal	Ilaiyaraaja	"Azhagu Malaraada"	Vaali	T. S. Raghavendra
Naan Mahaan Alla	"Maalai Soodum Vaelai"	Ilaiyaraaja	Vaali	S. P. Balasubrahmanyam
Naan Mahaan Alla	"Kalyanam Vaipogum"	Ilaiyaraaja	Vaali	S. P. Balasubrahmanyam
Naan Mahaan Alla	"Um Mele Oru Kannu"	Ilaiyaraaja	Vaali	Malaysia Vasudevan
Naan Paadum Paadal	"Paadavaa Un Paadalai"	Ilaiyaraaja	Vairamuthu	solo
Naan Paadum Paadal	"Paadava Un Paadalai (Pathos)"	Ilaiyaraaja	Vairamuthu	solo
Naan Paadum Paadal	"Devan Kovil"	Ilaiyaraaja	Muthulingam	
Naan Paadum Paadal	"Devan Kovil (Solo)"	Ilaiyaraaja	Muthulingam	S. N. Surendar
Naan Paadum Paadal	"Seer Kondu Vaa"	Ilaiyaraaja	Gangai Amaran	S. P. Balasubrahmanyam

==== 1985 ====
Year	Film	Music director	Writer	Co-singer
Aduthathu Albert	"Aadidu Peyygaley"	Ilaiyaraaja	Gangai Amaran	Vani Jairam, Malaysia Vasudevan, Kovai Soundararajan
Aduthathu Albert	"Idhayame"	Ilaiyaraaja	Ponnaruvi	Malaysia Vasudevan
Aduthathu Albert	"Va Va Mysooru"	Ilaiyaraaja	Vaali	Ramesh, Malaysia Vasudevan
Bandham	"Baby Baby O My Baby"	Shankar–Ganesh		T. M. Soundararajan
Sri Raghavendrar	"Unakkum Enakkum"	Ilaiyaraaja	Vaali	Malaysia Vasudevan

==== 1986 ====
Year	Film	Music director	Writer	Co-singer
Aayiram Pookkal Malarattum	"Poomedaiyo"	V. S. Narasimhan	N/A	S. P. Balasubrahmanyam
Aayiram Pookkal Malarattum	"Nethu Unna Pathu"	V. S. Narasimhan	N/A	S. P. Balasubrahmanyam
Uyire Unakkaga	"Ododi Vilaiyadu"	Laxmikant–Pyarelal	M. G. Vallabhan	S. P. Balasubrahmanyam
Uyire Unakkaga	"I Want To Be A Big Man"	Laxmikant–Pyarelal	Vaali	S. P. Balasubrahmanyam
Uyire Unakkaga	"Kavithaigal Veeriyum"	Laxmikant–Pyarelal	M. G. Vallabhan	S. P. Balasubrahmanyam
Uyire Unakkaga	"Kaiyale Unnai"	Laxmikant–Pyarelal	Muthulingam	S. P. Balasubrahmanyam
Uyire Unakkaga	"Pallavi Illamal" – 2	Laxmikant–Pyarelal	Vairamuthu	S. P. Balasubrahmanyam
Uyire Unakkaga	"Panneeril Nanaintha"	Laxmikant–Pyarelal	Vaali	
Uyire Unakkaga	"Thenurum Ragam" – 1	Laxmikant–Pyarelal	Vairamuthu	
Uyire Unakkaga	"Thenurum Ragam" – 2	Laxmikant–Pyarelal	Vairamuthu	
Kannukku Mai Ezhuthu	"Anbu Malargalin"	Ilaiyaraaja	K. Kalimuthu	solo
Maragatha Veenai	"Ennai Nee Padathe"	Ilaiyaraaja	Vaali	
Maragatha Veenai	"Kanna Vaa"	Ilaiyaraaja	Vairamuthu	
Maragatha Veenai	"Isaiyin Deivam"	Ilaiyaraaja	Vairamuthu	
Maragatha Veenai	"Oru Poovanakuyil"	Ilaiyaraaja	Mu. Metha	
Maragatha Veenai	"Maragatha Veenai"	Ilaiyaraaja	Pulamaipithan	K. J. Yesudas
Maragatha Veenai	"Suthaa Madhuraya"	Ilaiyaraaja	Tyagaraja	V. Dakshinamoorthy
Thazhuvatha Kaigal	"Onna Renda"	Ilaiyaraaja	Vaali	P. Jayachandran
Thazhuvatha Kaigal	"Thottu Paaru"	Ilaiyaraaja	Gangai Amaran	P. Jayachandran
Thazhuvatha Kaigal	"Vizhiye"	Ilaiyaraaja	Gangai Amaran	P. Jayachandran
Thazhuvatha Kaigal	"Poonguil"	Ilaiyaraaja	Vaali	
Kadalora Kavithaigal	"Adi Aathadi"	Ilaiyaraaja	Vairamuthi	Ilaiyaraaja
Kadalora Kavithaigal	"Adi Aathadi" (Sad)	Ilaiyaraaja	Vairamuthi	Malaysia Vasudevan
Kadalora Kavithaigal	"Kodiyile Malliyapoo"	Ilaiyaraaja	Vairamuthi	P. Jayachandran
Kadalora Kavithaigal	"Poguthae Poguthae"	Ilaiyaraaja	Vairamuthi	S. P. Balasubrahmanyam

==== 1987 ====
Year	Film	Music director	Writer	Co-singer
Chinna Thambi Periya Thambi	"Oru Kathal Enbathu"	Ilaiyaraaja	Vairamuthu	S. P. Balasubrahmanyam
Enga Chinna Rosa	"Kondai Seval Koovum"	Shankar–Ganesh	Vaali	S. P. Balasubrahmanyam
Enga Chinna Rosa	"Mama Unakku Oru"	Shankar–Ganesh	Vaali	S. P. Balasubrahmanyam
Enga Chinna Rosa	"Then Pandi Cheemai"	Shankar–Ganesh	Vaali	S. P. Balasubrahmanyam
Mupperum Deviyar	"Thaneeril Oru Pournamani Thingal"	M. S. Viswanathan	N/A	P. Jayachandran
Paruva Ragam	"Kelamma Kelamma"	Hamsalekha	Vairamuthu	S. P. Balasubrahmanyam
Paruva Ragam	"Poove Unnai Nesithen"	Hamsalekha	Vairamuthu	S. P. Balasubrahmanyam
Paruva Ragam	"Hey Maama Vandi Otta"	Hamsalekha	Vairamuthu	S. P. Balasubrahmanyam
Paruva Ragam	"Oru Aanum Pennum"	Hamsalekha	Vairamuthu	S. P. Balasubrahmanyam
Paruva Ragam	"Yaar Evano"	Hamsalekha	Vairamuthu	solo
Paruva Ragam	"Adea Amma Kannu"	Hamsalekha	Vairamuthu	solo
Paruva Ragam	"Kadhal Illai"	Hamsalekha	Vairamuthu	K. J. Yesudas

==== 1988 ====
Film	Song	Composer(s)	Writer(s)	Co-artist(s)
Agni Natchathiram	"Thoongatha Vizhigal Rendu"	Ilaiyaraaja	Vaali	K. J. Yesudas
Agni Natchathiram	"Roja Poo Adivanthathu"	Ilaiyaraaja	Vaali	solo
Agni Natchathiram	"Poonga Vanam"	Ilaiyaraaja	Vaali	solo
Idhu Namma Aalu	" Kamadevan Aalayam"	K. Bhagyaraj	Vaali	S. P. Balasubrahmanyam
Idhu Namma Aalu	"Naan Aalana Thamari"	K. Bhagyaraj	Vaali	solo

==== 1989 ====
Film	Song	Composer(s)	Writer(s)	Co-artist(s)
Aararo Aariraro	"En Kannukkoru Nilavaa"	K. Bhagyaraj	Vaali	S. P. Balasubrahmanyam, chorus
Aararo Aariraro	"Thaana Thalaiyadunda"	K. Bhagyaraj	Vaali	solo
Apoorva Sagodharargal	"Vaazhavaikum Kadhalakku Jey"	Ilaiyaraaja	Vaali	S. P. Balasubrahmanyam
En Rathathin Rathame	"Vaathiyaare Chinna"	Shankar–Ganesh	Vaali	chorus
En Rathathin Rathame	"Ora Ayiram" (I Love You)	Shankar–Ganesh	Pulamaipithan	S. P. Balasubrahmanyam
En Rathathin Rathame	"En Peru Sweety"	Shankar–Ganesh	Pulamaipithan	solo
Idhayathai Thirudathe	"Om Namaha"	Illaiyaraaja	Vaali	Mano
Paasa Mazhai	"Oru Paattu Un Manasai"	Ilaiyaraaja	Vaali	M. S. Rajeswari & Mano
Paasa Mazhai	"Oru Paattu Un Manasai"	Ilaiyaraaja	Vaali	solo
Ponnu Pakka Poren	"Aavaram Poovu"	K. Bhagyaraj	Kamakodiyan	solo

== 1990s ==
Year	Film	Song	Music director	Lyrics	Co-singer	Notes
1990	Nadigan	"Deiva Malligai Poove Poove"	Ilaiyaraaja	Pulamaipithan	S. P. Balasubramaniam	
1990	Michael Madana Kama Rajan	"Paer Vatchalum Vaikkama"	Ilaiyaraaja	Vaali	Malaysia Vasudevan	
1990	Michael Madana Kama Rajan	"Sundara Neeyum Sundari Njanum"	Ilaiyaraaja	Panchu Arunachalam, Poovachal Khader	Kamal Haasan	
1991	Dharma Durai	"Onnu Rendu"	Ilaiyaraaja	Panchu Arunachalam	Mano	
1991	Dharma Durai	"Santhaikku Vantha Kili"	Ilaiyaraaja	Panchu Arunachalam	S. P. Balasubrahmanyam	
1991	Pavunnu Pavunuthan	"Then Madurai"	K. Bhagyaraj	Vairamuthu	S. P. Balasubrahmanyam	
1991	Pavunnu Pavunuthan	"Uchchani" (female)	K. Bhagyaraj	Vairamuthu	solo	
1991	Pavunnu Pavunuthan	"Mama Unakku"	K. Bhagyaraj	Pulamaipithan	solo	
1991	Nattukku Oru Nallavan	"Chinna Kannamma"	Hamsalekha	Vairamuthu	S. P. Balasubrahmanyam	
1991	Nattukku Oru Nallavan	"En Thayinmani Kodiye"	Hamsalekha	Vairamuthu	S. P. Balasubrahmanyam	
1991	Nattukku Oru Nallavan	"Thendrale Thendral"	Hamsalekha	Vairamuthu	S. P. Balasubrahmanyam	
1991	Nattukku Oru Nallavan	"Veedi Katti Vilaiyadalama"	Hamsalekha	Muthulingam	S. P. Balasubrahmanyam	
1991	Nattukku Oru Nallavan	"Ore Moochi Ponal"	Hamsalekha	Muthulingam	solo	
1991	Pondatti Sonna Kettukanum	"Vandhale"	Chandrabose		Vani Jayaram & P. Susheela	
1991	Thalapathi	"Sundari Kannal"	Ilaiyaraaja	Vaali	S. P. Balasubrahmanyam	
1991	Thalapathi	"Putham Puthu Poo"	Ilaiyaraaja	Vaali	K. J. Yesudas	
1991	Thalapathi	"Chinna Thayaval"	Ilaiyaraaja	Vaali	solo	
1991	Gunaa	"Unnai Naan"	Ilaiyaraaja	Vaali	Ustad Sultan Khan	
1991	Gunaa	"Kanmani Anbodu Kadhalan"	Ilaiyaraaja	Vaali	Kamal Haasan	
1992	Mannan	"Adikuthu Kuliru"	Ilaiyaraaja	Vaali	Rajnikanth	
1992	Mannan	"Mannar Mannaney"	Ilaiyaraaja	Vaali	S. P. Balasubrahmanyam	
1992	Deiva Vaakku	"Valli Valli Enna Vandhan"	Ilaiyaraaja	Vaali	Ilaiyaraaja	
1992	Deiva Vaakku	"Oorellam Saamiyaga"	Ilaiyaraaja	Gangai Amaran	P. Jayachandran	
1992	Thevar Magan	"Inji Idupazhaga" (Duet)	Ilaiyaraaja	Vaali	Kamal Hassan, Minmini	
1992	Thevar Magan	"Inji Idupazhaga" (solo)	Ilaiyaraaja	Vaali	solo	
1992	Surieyan	"Laalaku Dole"	Deva	Vaali	Mano, Deva	
1992	Surieyan	"Pathinettu Vayadhu"	Deva	Vaali	S. P. Balasubrahmanyam	
1992	Surieyan	"Kottungadi Kummi"	Deva	Vaali	S. P. Balasubrahmanyam	
1992	Surieyan	"Thoongu Moonchi"	Deva	Vaali	S. P. Balasubrahmanyam	
1993	Ponnumani	"Nenjukkule Innarendru"	Ilaiyaraaja	R. V. Udayakumar	S. P. Balasubramaniam	
1993	Ponnumani	"Aathu Mettula Muttham"	Ilaiyaraaja	R. V. Udayakumar	S. P. Balasubramaniam	
1993	Kalaignan	"Endhan Nenjil"	Ilaiyaraaja	Vaali	KJ Yesudas	
1993	Gentleman	"Ottagathai Kattiko"	A. R. Rahman	Vairamuthu	S. P. Balasubramaniam	
1993	Kilipetchu Ketkava	"Sivagami Ninaipiniley"	Ilaiyaraaja	Vaali	S. P. Balasubramaniam	
1993	Kilipetchu Ketkava	"Anbe Vaa"	Ilaiyaraaja	Vaali		
1993	Chinna Mappillai	"Vaanam Vazhthida"	Ilaiyaraaja	Vaali	S. P. Balasubrahmanyam	
1993	Chinna Mappillai	"Kadhorum Lolakku"	Ilaiyaraaja	Vaali	Mano	
1993	Ezhai Jaathi	"Adho Andha Nadhiyoram"	Ilaiyaraaja	Gangai Amaran	solo	
1993	Marupadiyum	"Aasai Athigam"	Ilaiyaraaja	Ravi Bharathi	solo	
1993	Marupadiyum	"Nallathor Veenai"	Ilaiyaraaja	Bharathiyar	solo	
1993	Yajaman	"Nilave Mugam"	Ilaiyaraaja	R. V. Udayakumar	S. P. Balasubrahmanyam	
1993	Yajaman	"Oru Naalam"	Ilaiyaraaja	R. V. Udayakumar	S. P. Balasubrahmanyam	
1993	Yajaman	"Urakka Kathuthu Kozhi"	Ilaiyaraaja	R. V. Udayakumar	solo	
1993	Sabash Babu	"Thottukava"	T. Rajendar		solo	
1993	Athma	"Kannale Kadhal Kavithai"	Ilaiyaraaja	Vaali	K. J. Yesudas	
1993	Athma	"Ninaikkindra Paadhaiyil"	Ilaiyaraaja	Vaali	solo	
1993	Athma	"Vilakku Vaipom"	Ilaiyaraaja	Vaali	solo	
1994	Adharmam	"Muthu Mani"	Ilaiyaraaja			
1994	Adharmam	"Thakathana"	Ilaiyaraaja			
1994	Amaidhi Padai	"Muthunani Ther Irukku"	Ilaiyaraaja			
1994	Atha Maga Rathiname	"Alli Alli Veesuthama"	Gangai Amaran			
1994	Atha Maga Rathiname	"Engayo Valukkuthaiye"	Gangai Amaran			
1994	Athiradi Padai	"Ada Jaangurey"	Ilaiyaraaja			
1994	Athiradi Padai	"Ennachi"	Ilaiyaraaja			
1994	Athiradi Padai	"Katalugu Pappa"	Ilaiyaraaja			
1994	Athiradi Padai	"Yammaadi"	Ilaiyaraaja			
1994	En Aasai Machan	"Thalaivanai Azhaikuthu"	Deva			
1994	Honest Raj	"Izhuthu Potheena"	Ilaiyaraaja			
1994	Honest Raj	"Katti Pudikkattma"	Ilaiyaraaja			
1994	Honest Raj	"Vanil Vidivelli"	Ilaiyaraaja			
1994	Indhu	"Aeye Kuttii Munnal"	Deva	Vaali	S. P. Balasubrahmanyam	
1994	Indhu	"Eppadi Eppadi"	Deva	Vaali	S. P. Balasubrahmanyam	
1994	Jai Hind	"Kanna En Selai"	Vidyasagar			
1994	Kaadhalan	"Erani Kuradhani"	A. R. Rahman	Rajashri	S. P. Balasubrahmanyam	
1994	Kanmani	"Aasai Idhyam"	Ilaiyaraaja			
1994	Kanmani	"Busilla"	Ilaiyaraaja			
1994	Kanmani	"Madicharu"	Ilaiyaraaja			
1994	Kanmani	"Netru Vandha Kaatru"	Ilaiyaraaja			
1994	Kaviyam	"Maalai Nilavae"	M Ponraj			
1994	Magalir Mattum	"Veettai Thaandi"	Ilaiyaraaja	Vaali	solo	
1994	Magalir Mattum	"Mothu Mothuunnu"	Ilaiyaraaja	Vaali	solo	
1994	Magalir Mattum	"Karavai Maadu"	Ilaiyaraaja	Vaali	S. P. Balasubrahmanyam	
1994	Mahanadhi	"Solladha Raagangal"	Ilaiyaraaja			
1994	Manasu Rendum Pudhusu	"Cholike Peeche"	Deva			
1994	Manju Virattu	"Mammeh Vangi"	Deva			
1994	Namma Annachi	"Cheran Cholan Pandiyar"	Deva			
1994	Nattamai	"Kotta Paakkum"	Sirpy			
1994	Priyanka	"Nyabagam Illaiyo"(Duet)	Ilaiyaraaja			
1994	Raasamahan	"Anju Kajam Kanji Pattu"	Ilaiyaraaja			
1994	Raasamahan	"Pombala Velaiya"	Ilaiyaraaja			
1994	Rajakumaran	"Chinna Chinna Sol"	Ilaiyaraaja		K. J. Yesudas	
1994	Rajakumaran	"Kaatule Kambakaatule"	Ilaiyaraaja			
1994	Raja Pandi	"Naan Aadi"	Deva			
1994	Seeman	"Manu Koduthu"	Ilaiyaraaja			
1994	Sevatha Ponnu	"Thodalama Koodathaa"	Deva			
1994	Sevatha Ponnu	"Vadakku Kathu Veesa"	Deva			
1994	Sindhu Nathi Poo	"Kadavullum Neeyam"	Soundaryan		Unni Menon	
1994	Sindhu Nathi Poo	"Adiye Adi Chinnapulla"	Soundaryan		Mano	
1994	Subramaniya Swamy	"Andru Namma"	Deva		Malaysia Vasudevan	
1994	Super Police	"Pakka Gentleman"	A. R. Rahman			
1994	Thaai Manasu	"Kathoram Kallu"	Deva			
1994	Thaai Manasu	"Oororam Kammakarai"	Deva			
1994	Thaai Manasu	"Thoothuvalai"	Deva			
1994	Thaai Manasu	"Thuppakki Na"	Deva			
1994	Vanaja Girija	"Munnam Seydha"	Ilaiyaraaja			
1994	Vandicholai Chinraasu	"Barota Barota"	A. R. Rahman	Na. Kamarasan	S. P. Balasubrahmanyam	
1994	Varavu Ettana Selavu Pathana	"Aasa Machan"	Chandrabose			
1994	Varavu Ettana Selavu Pathana	"Santhosam"	Chandrabose			
1994	Veetla Visheshanga	"Konjam Sangeetham"	Ilaiyaraaja			
1994	Veetla Visheshanga	"Malare Thendral"(Duet)	Ilaiyaraaja		Arunmozhi	
1995	Avatharam	"Thendral Vanthu Theendumbothu"	Ilaiyaraaja	Vaali	Ilaiyaraaja	
1995	Avatharam	"Arithaaratha Poosikolla Aasai"	Ilaiyaraaja		Ilaiyaraaja	
1995	Mayabazaar	"Oru Oorile"	Ilaiyaraaja	|Panchu Arunachalam	Urvashi, S. P. Balasubrahmanyam, Viji Manuel	
1995	Muthu Kaalai	"Antha Konji Kalaiyatha"	Ilaiyaraaja	Vaali	S. P. Balasubramaniam	
1995	Muthu Kaalai	"Punnai Vanathu"	Ilaiyaraaja	Vaali	S. P. Balasubramaniam	
1995	Muthu Kaalai	"Enge Vaipparu"	Ilaiyaraaja	Vaali	S. P. Balasubramaniam	
1995	Sandhaikku Vandha Kili	"Erykanchediyoram"	Deva	Vaali	S. P. Balasubrahmanyam	
1995	Sandhaikku Vandha Kili	"Otthikka Mama"	Deva	Madhuradasan		
1997	Aahaa Enna Porutham	"Sinthamani"	Vidyasagar			
1997	Aahaa Enna Porutham	"Vulakku Le Le"	Vidyasagar			
1997	Devathai	"Orunal Antha"	Ilaiyaraaja			
1997	Ettupatti Rasa	"Kaathu Adikkidhu"	Deva			
1997	Ettupatti Rasa	"Panju Mittai"	Deva			
1997	Kadhal Palli	"Achani"	Deva			
1997	Kalyana Vaibhogam	"Daada Budala"	Deva			
1997	Maradha Uravu	"Pudya Pudya Un"	Sirpy			
1997	Maradha Uravu	"Othaikku Othai"	Sirpy			
1997	Maradha Uravu	"Yendan Manathukuliruntha"	Sirpy			
1997	Pudhayal	"Dheem Thakka"	Vidyasagar		Mano	
1997	Sishya	"Bombay Dyeing"	Deva			
1997	Thambi Durai	"Maama"	Ilaiyaraaja			
1997	Thambi Durai	"Unnai Nambi"	Ilaiyaraaja			
1998	Oonjal	"Rosa Rosapoo"	A. R. Rahman			
1998	Ponmaanai Thedi	"Naan Paadum"	Soundaryan			
1998	Ponmaanai Thedi	"Ponmaanai"	Soundaryan		S. P. Balasubrahmanyam	
1998	Rathna	"Santhana Kaathae"	Jayasurya			
1998	Uyire	"Nenjinile Nenjinile"	A. R. Rahman			
1998	Veera Thalattu	"Padikattuma"	Ilaiyaraaja			
1999	Iraniyan	"Cheepoya Nee"	Deva		S. P. Balasubrahmanyam	
1999	Jodi	"Kadhal Kaditham"	A. R. Rahman		Unni Menon	
1999	Kannodu Kanbathellam	"Iruvathu"(Solo)	Deva			
1999	Kannodu Kanbathellam	"Iruvathu"(Female)	Deva		Hariharan	
1999	Mudhalvan	"Mudhalvanae"	A. R. Rahman		Shankar Mahadevan	
1999	Nesam Pudhusu	"Poonguyilu Saththamthan"	Bobby			
1999	Rajasthan	"Machan"	Ilaiyaraaja		K. S. Chithra	
1999	Sangamam	"Margazhi Thingal"	A. R. Rahman	Vairamuthu	P. Unnikrishnan	

== 2000s ==
Year	Film	Song	Music director	Lyrics	Co-singer	Note(s)
2000	Kannan Varuvaan	"Seeraga Samba"	Sirpy	Palani Bharathi	S. P. Balasubrahmanyam	
2000	Kannukku Kannaga	"Sama Kukir Adikkuthu"	Deva	Kalidasan	Krishnaraj	
2000	Maayi	"Megam Udaithu"	S. A. Rajkumar	Ra. Ravishankar	Rajesh Krishnan	
2000	Maayi	"Sooriyane"	S. A. Rajkumar	Ra. Ravishankar		
2000	Unnai Kann Theduthey	"Aaki Vecha"	Deva	Kalaikumar	P. Unnikrishnan	
2000	Vallarasu	"Chekka Chekka"	Deva	Vairamuthu	S. P. Balasubrahmanyam	
2001	Paarvai Ondre Podhume	"Yen Asaindhaadum"	Bharani	Pa. Vijay	P. Unnikrishnan	
2001	Rishi	"Vaa Vaa Poove Vaa"	Yuvan Shankar Raja	Palani Bharathi	Hariharan	
2001	Thavasi	"Ethanai Ethanai"	Vidyasagar	Kabilan	Shankar Mahadevan	
2002	Alli Arjuna	"Endhan Nenjil"	A. R. Rahman	Vairamuthu	Srinivas	
2004	Udhaya	"Anjanam"	A. R. Rahman	Palani Bharathi & A. M. Rathnam	S. P. Balasubrahmanyam	
2009	Perumal	"Kadhal Vaipogamae"	Srikanth Deva	Kabilan	Arivunidhi	

== 2010s ==
Year	Film	Song	Music director	Lyrics	Co-singer	Note(s)
2010	Sindhu Samaveli	"Yaar Inge"	Sundar C. Babu			
2010	Vallakottai	"Semmozhiye Semmozhiye"	Dhina		S. P. Balasubrahmanyam	
2014	Velaiilla Pattadhari	"Ammaa Ammaa"	Anirudh	Dhanush	Dhanush	
2016	Thirunaal	"Thandhaiyum Yaaro"	Srikanth Deva	Vijay Muthu		
2018	Pannadi	"Un Usuru Kaathula"	Rajesh Ramalingam			

== Television ==
Year	Serial	Song	Music director	Channel	Note(s)
2000	Kula Vilakku	"Vaan Sindhum"	T. Vijayshankar	Sun TV	This serial had two different title tracks; first track sung by K. S. Chithra was used in first few episodes and S. Janaki's song was added from episode 49.
