= Intiki Deepam Illale =

- Theatrical release poster
- Directed by: V. N. Reddy
- Written by: Acharya Aatreya (dialogues)
- Story by: Thuraiyur K. Murthy
- Based on: Sabrina
- Produced by: T. R. Ramanna
- Starring: N. T. Rama Rao; B. Saroja Devi; Jaggayya
- Cinematography: V. Gopi Krishna
- Edited by: R. Rajagopal
- Music by: Viswanathan–Ramamoorthy
- Production company: R. R. Pictures
- Release date: 26 January 1961
- Running time: 135 mins
- Country: India
- Language: Telugu

Intiki Deepam Illale (transl. Wife is the light of the house) is a 1961 Indian Telugu-language romance film, produced by T. R. Ramanna and directed by V. N. Reddy. It stars N. T. Rama Rao, B. Saroja Devi and Jaggayya, with music composed by Viswanathan–Ramamoorthy. The film was simultaneously made in Tamil as Manapanthal (1961); both versions were based on the American film Sabrina (1954; based on Samuel A. Taylor's 1953 play Sabrina Fair).

== Plot ==
Brothers Raja Sekhar and Chandra Sekhar hail from a zamindar family. Raja, a heavy drinker but a kind-hearted man, lives with his mother, Sitamma, in their hometown. Meanwhile, Chandra Sekhar, a medical professional in Madras, rents a room in the house of a widow, Devamma, and her daughter, Malathi, who has feelings for him, though he does not reciprocate.

Chandra Sekhar saves an elderly man named Dharmalingam, which leads to him meeting Dharmalingam's daughter, Suguna. They soon develop feelings for each other. Malathi is devastated upon discovering this, as she had hoped to marry Chandra Sekhar. Meanwhile, Sitamma decides to arrange a marriage for Raja in an attempt to reform him, and a proposal comes from Dharmalingam. However, Suguna mistakenly believes the man she is to marry is Chandra Sekhar, only to realize at the last moment that it is Raja. Out of respect for her father, Suguna reluctantly marries Raja.

During the wedding, Raja notices Suguna's cold demeanour and assumes she does not like him. As a result, he distances himself from her. Chandra Sekhar, who was unable to attend the wedding due to an accident, is shocked to discover that Suguna is now his sister-in-law. He later learns from Raja that Suguna had once been in love with someone else, which leads Raja to feel betrayed and leave the house. This causes Sitamma to fall seriously ill.

On her deathbed, Sitamma urges Chandra Sekhar to reconcile with his brother and reunite him with his wife. Chandra Sekhar works to convince Raja of Suguna's love for him, helping him understand her feelings. Meanwhile, Devamma forces Suguna into another arranged marriage, and in despair, Suguna contemplates suicide. Chandra Sekhar intervenes, realizing her deep affection for him, and decides to marry her. The film concludes with a happy reunion of the family.

== Cast ==
- N. T. Rama Rao as Raja Sekhar
- B. Saroja Devi as Suguna
- Jaggayya as Chandra Sekhar
- Relangi as Dr. Avataram
- Ramana Reddy as Astama Jyothishyudu
- V. Nagayya as Dharmalingam
- Vangara as Sidhanthi
- Kannamba as Seetamma
- Girija as Navami
- E. V. Saroja as Malathi
- Malathi as Devamma

== Music ==
Music was composed by Viswanathan–Ramamoorthy.

Song title	Lyrics	Singers	length
"Vinumucheli Thelipedanu"	Sri Sri	P. Susheela	3:07
"Pongi Pongi"	Acharya Aatreya	L. R. Eswari	
"Neeve Neeve"	Acharya Aatreya	P. B. Srinivas, P. Susheela	3:45
"Oke Raagam Oke Taalam"	Acharya Aatreya	P. Susheela	3:39
"Yevariki Vaaru Kapala"	Acharya Aatreya	P. B. Srinivas	4:09
"Ammayigariki"	Sri Sri	Pithapuram, L. R. Eswari	3:12
"Vinumucheli Thelipedanu" (Pathos)	Sri Sri	P. Susheela	
"Kapupupanta Kodukulani"	Acharya Aatreya	P. Susheela	

== Reception ==
Zamin Ryot appreciated the film primarily for its cinematography and music. Andhra Prabha appreciated the soulful scenes, dialogues, song and dance sequences.
