= Manapanthal =

1961 film by V. N. Reddy

- Theatrical release poster
- Directed by: V. N. Reddy
- Screenplay by: Thuraiyur K. Moorthy
- Based on: Sabrina
- Produced by: T. R. Ramanna
- Starring: S. S. Rajendran; S. A. Ashokan; B. Saroja Devi; E. V. Saroja
- Music by: Viswanathan–Ramamoorthy
- Production company: R. R. Pictures
- Release date: 14 January 1961
- Running time: 150 minutes
- Country: India
- Language: Tamil

Manapanthal (transl. Marriage Hall) is 1961 Indian Tamil-language romance film, directed by V. N. Reddy, produced by T. R. Ramanna and written by Thuraiyur K. Moorthy, with music by Viswanathan–Ramamoorthy. The film stars S. S. Rajendran, S. A. Ashokan, B. Saroja Devi and E. V. Saroja, with P. Kannamba, V. Nagayya, Rama Rao, K. A. Thangavelu and M. Saroja in supporting roles. The film was simultaneously made in Telugu as Intiki Deepam Illale; both versions are based on the American film Sabrina (1954; based on Samuel A. Taylor's 1953 play Sabrina Fair).

== Plot ==
Rajasekaran is an alcoholic, and his younger brother Gunasekaran is a successful medical practitioner. The widowed mother Kannamba showers her love and affection on her two sons and tries to reform Rajasekaran, with little success. Gunasekaran stays in another town with a widowed mother Dharuvamma and her sprightly daughter Malathi, who falls in love with him; he too seems to show some interest in her.

However, on a rail journey to his hometown, Gunasekaran meets Dharmalingam, an elderly man with a daughter Suguna and both fall in love, and hope to marry soon. Meanwhile, Rajasekaran's mother hopes marriage will reform him and fixes his marriage with Suguna, not realising that Gunasekaran is love with her.

The wedding takes place. Gunasekaran, who is unable to attend due to an accident, does not known that the bride is Suguna. Later, when he meets her, he is shocked. Rajasekaran suspects his wife and brother when he learns that she was his lover earlier. He decides to kill them. Meanwhile, Kannamba dies, leaving behind all the property to her daughter-in-law.

Gunasekaran puts on an act of having become an alcoholic and makes overtures to his sister-in-law Suguna, who slaps him. Seeing this, her husband realises the truth and apologises to her. The family is reunited. While travelling via train, Gunasekaran notices a young woman dressed as a bride lying on the railway track to commit suicide. The train stops in time and Gunasekaran finds that the woman is Malathi, who is still in love with him. The two marry.

== Cast ==
- S. S. Rajendran as Dr. Gunasekaran
- S. A. Ashokan as Rajasekaran
- B. Saroja Devi as Suguna
- E. V. Saroja as Malathi
- P. Kannamba as Kannamba
- V. Nagayya as Dharmalingam
- K. A. Thangavelu as Dr. Navadeenal
- M. Saroja as Navami
- Rama Rao as Ashtami
- K. Malathi as Dharuvamma

== Production ==
Manapanthal was directed by V. N. Reddy and produced by T. R. Ramanna under R. R. Pictures. Thuraiyur K. Murthi wrote the screenplay. Hiralal and Gopalakrishnan were the dance choreographers. It was simultaneously made in Telugu as Intiki Deepam Illale; both versions were based on the American film Sabrina (1954).

== Soundtrack ==
The music was composed by Viswanathan–Ramamoorthy, while the lyrics were written by Kannadasan. The songs were well received, and contributed to the success of the film. Two songs – "Unakkum Matttum Unakkum", sung by P. Susheela, and "Udalukku Uyir Kaaval", sung by P. B. Srinivas – attained popularity, especially the latter which speaks against alcoholism.

Song	Singer	Length
"Unakku Mattum Unakku"	P. Susheela	3:21
"Orey Raagam Orey Thaalam"	P. Susheela	3:36
"Unakku Mattum Unakku" (Sad)	P. Susheela	2:27
"Paarthu Paarthu Nindrathile"	P. B. Srinivas P. Susheela	3:28
"Muthu Muthu Pacharisi"	S. Janaki & L. R. Eswari	4:41
"Udalukku Uyir Kaaval"	P. B. Srinivas	4:10
"Ammavukku Manasukkuley"	S. C. Krishnan,L.R.Eswari	3:13
"Petretuthu Peyarumittu"	T. S. Bagavathi	3:52

== Release and reception ==
Manapanthal was released on 14 January 1961. The film was a commercial success, running for over 100 days in theatres.
