= E. V. Saroja =

Indian actress and dancer

- Born: 1935; Enkan Village, Thiruvarur District, Tamil Nadu
- Died: 3 November 2006 (aged 70–71); Chennai, Tamil Nadu
- Spouse: T. R. Ramanna

E. V. Saroja (1935 - 2006), also known as Enkan V. Saroja, was an Indian actress and dancer. She hailed from Enkan village in Thiruvarur District, Tamil Nadu.

Her debut film was En Thangai, released in 1952, where she starred as the younger sister of M. G. Ramachandran.

== Filmography ==
Year	Film	Language	Role	Notes
1952	En Thangai	Tamil	Meena	
1954	Vilayattu Bommai	Tamil		
1955	Gulebagavali	Tamil	Gulzar	
1955	Nalla Thangal	Tamil		
1955	Needhipathi	Tamil	Dancer	
1955	Pennarasi	Tamil	Mallika	
1956	Amara Deepam	Tamil		
1956	Amara Jeevi	Telugu		
1956	Bhakta Vijaya	Kannada		
1956	Bhale Ramudu	Telugu	Dancer	
1956	Madurai Veeran	Tamil	Killi	
1956	Marumalarchi	Tamil		
1956	Melukolupu	Telugu		
1956	Nannambikkai	Tamil		
1956	Paasavalai	Tamil	Dancer	
1956	Penki Pellam	Telugu		
1956	Prema Pasam	Tamil	Dancer	
1956	Rambaiyin Kaadhal	Tamil	Urvashi	
1956	Sadarama	Telugu		
1957	Anbe Deivam	Tamil	Dancer	
1957	Manaalane Mangaiyin Baakkiyam	Tamil	Goddess Parvathi	
1957	Pudhumai Pithan	Tamil	Aprajitha	
1957	Suvarna Sundari	Telugu	Goddess Parvathi	
1957	Bhagya Rekha	Telugu	Dancer	
1957	Chakravarthi Thirumagal	Tamil	Dancer	
1957	Engal Veettu Mahalakshmi	Tamil	Dancer	
1957	Dongallo Dora	Telugu	Dancer	
1957	Karpukkarasi	Tamil	Sasikala	
1957	Kutumba Gowravam	Telugu	Mohana	
1957	Neelamalai Thirudan	Tamil	Chokki	
1957	Pakka Thirudan	Tamil	Dancer	
1957	Premada Putri	Kannada	Dancer	
1957	Rani Lalithangi	Tamil	Dancer	
1957	Soubhagyavathi	Tamil	Dancer	
1957	Soubhagyavathi	Telugu	Dancer	
1957	Thodi Kodallu	Telugu	Dancer	
1957	Veera Kankanam	Telugu	Dancer	
1958	Appu Chesi Pappu Koodu	Telugu	Dancer	
1958	Chenchu Lakshmi	Tamil	Dancer	
1958	Chenchu Lakshmi	Telugu	Dancer	
1958	Kadan Vaangi Kalyaanam	Tamil	Usha	
1958	Kathavarayan	Tamil	Swarnam	
1958	Karthavarayuni Katha	Telugu	Mohini	
1958	Kudumba Gouravam	Tamil	Sarala	
1958	Matwala	Hindi	Chokki	
1958	Pillai Kaniyamudhu	Tamil		
1958	Sarangadhara	Tamil	Dancer	
1958	Sri Krishna Maya	Telugu	Dancer	
1958	Uttama Illalu	Telugu	Sasikala	
1958	Veera Khadgamu	Telugu	Aprajitha	
1958	Veettukku Vandha Varalakshmi	Telugu	Dancer	
1959	Athisaya Penn	Tamil	Dancer	
1959	Deivame Thunai	Tamil	Dancer	
1959	Sumangali	Tamil		
1959	Thanga Padhumai	Tamil	Dancer	
1959	Uzhavukkum Thozhilukkum Vandhanai Seivom	Tamil		
1960	Aada Vandha Deivam	Tamil	Bhairavi	
1960	Bhakta Vijayam	Telugu		
1960	Kaithi Kannayiram	Tamil	Madhavi	
1960	Nammina Bantu	Telugu	Dancer	
1960	Ondrupattal Undu Vazhvu	Tamil		
1960	Pattaliyin Vetri	Tamil	Dancer	
1960	Padikkadha Medhai	Tamil	Geetha	
1960	Raja Bakthi	Tamil	Dancer	
1960	Rathinapuri Ilavarasi	Tamil		
1961	Bhagyalakshmi	Tamil	Radha	
1961	Iddaru Mitrulu	Telugu	Padma	
1961	Intiki Deepam Illale	Telugu	Malathi	
1961	Krishna Kuchela	Malayalam		
1961	Manapanthal	Tamil	Malathi	
1961	Nallavan Vazhvan	Tamil	Senbagam	
1961	Pangaaligal	Tamil	Valli	
1961	Thooya Ullam	Tamil		
1961	Velugu Needalu	Telugu		
1961	Bhagyavanthulu	Telugu		
1962	Prajasakthi	Telugu		
1962	Veera Thirumagan	Tamil		
1963	Bandipotu	Telugu		
1963	Chaduvukunna Ammayilu	Telugu	Latha	
1963	Irugu Porugu	Telugu	Dancer	
1963	Koduthu Vaithaval	Tamil	Meenakshi	
1963	Narantakudu	Telugu		
1963	Niraparadhi	Telugu	Dancer	
1963	Veera Kesari	Kannada		
1964	Nalvaravu	Tamil		
1965	Sarvagna Murthy	Kannada		
1966	Sakunthala	Telugu	Menaka	
1968	Harichandra	Tamil	Dancer	

== Death ==
She died of heart failure in Chennai on Friday 3 November 2006.
