= Nalvaravu =

1964 film by Charlie–Maniam

- Theatrical release poster
- Directed by: Charlie–Maniam
- Written by: V. Lakshmanan
- Produced by: K. N. Natarajan
- Starring: R. Muthuraman; Pushpalatha; E. V. Saroja
- Music by: T. Chalapathi Rao
- Production company: S. V. Movies
- Release date: 5 March 1964
- Country: India
- Language: Tamil

Nalvaravu (transl. Welcome) is a 1964 Indian Tamil-language film directed by the duo Charlie–Maniam, produced by K. N. Natarajan and written by V. Lakshmanan. The film stars R. Muthuraman, Pushpalatha and E. V. Saroja. It was released on 5 March 1964.

== Cast ==
- R. Muthuraman
- Pushpalatha
- E. V. Saroja

== Production ==
Nalvaravu was directed by the duo Charlie–Maniam, produced by K. N. Natarajan under S. V. Movies, and written by Vidwan Ve. Lakshmanan. The final cut measured 4,388 metres (14,396 ft).

== Themes ==
The film deals primarily with divorce and remarriage.

== Soundtrack ==
The soundtrack was composed by T. Chalapathi Rao, with lyrics by Vidvan Ve. Lakshmanan.

Song	Singer/s	Length
"Kannipenne O Kannipenne"	P. B. Sreenivas & P. Susheela	03:15
"Penn Vaazhavendum Endraal"	P. Leela	03:17
"Yaarukku Yaaum Sondham Illai"	P. B. Sreenivas	03:36
"Aasaiyudan Avar Azhaitthaar"	L. R. Eswari	03:27

== Release and reception ==
Nalvaravu was released on 5 March 1964. A critic from The Indian Express said, "Rarely does one come across a movie which is bad in all aspects." T. M. Ramachandran of Sport and Pastime said the film provides "nothing but boredom for the cinegoers".
