= Sabrina (1954 film) =

1954 film by Billy Wilder

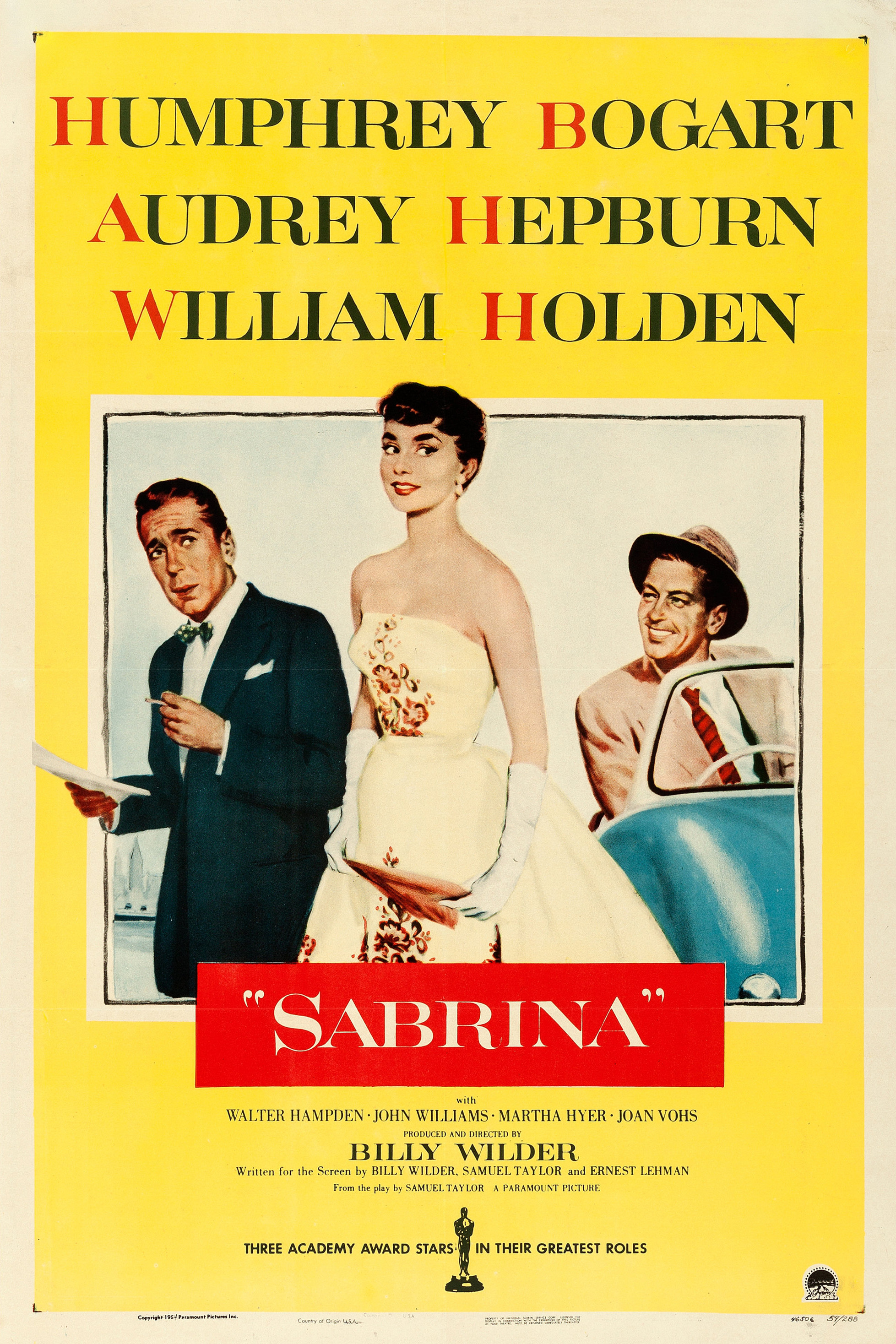
- Theatrical release poster
- Directed by: Billy Wilder
- Screenplay by: Billy Wilder; Samuel Taylor; Ernest Lehman
- Based on: Sabrina Fair by Samuel Taylor
- Produced by: Billy Wilder
- Starring: Humphrey Bogart; Audrey Hepburn; William Holden; Walter Hampden; John Williams; Martha Hyer; Joan Vohs
- Cinematography: Charles Lang Jr.
- Edited by: Arthur Schmidt
- Music by: Frederick Hollander
- Production company: Paramount Pictures
- Distributed by: Paramount Pictures
- Release dates: September 3, 1954 (Toronto premiere); September 23, 1954 (New York and Los Angeles)
- Running time: 113 minutes
- Country: United States
- Language: English
- Budget: $2.2 million
- Box office: $4 million (US and Canada rentals)

Sabrina (Sabrina Fair/La Vie en Rose in the United Kingdom) is a 1954 American romantic comedy-drama film produced and directed by Billy Wilder, from a screenplay he co-wrote with Samuel Taylor and Ernest Lehman, based on Taylor's 1953 play Sabrina Fair. The picture stars Humphrey Bogart, Audrey Hepburn, and William Holden. This was Wilder's last film released by Paramount Pictures, ending a 12-year business relationship between him and the company.

In 2002, the film was selected for preservation in the United States National Film Registry by the Library of Congress as being "culturally, historically, or aesthetically significant".

== Plot ==
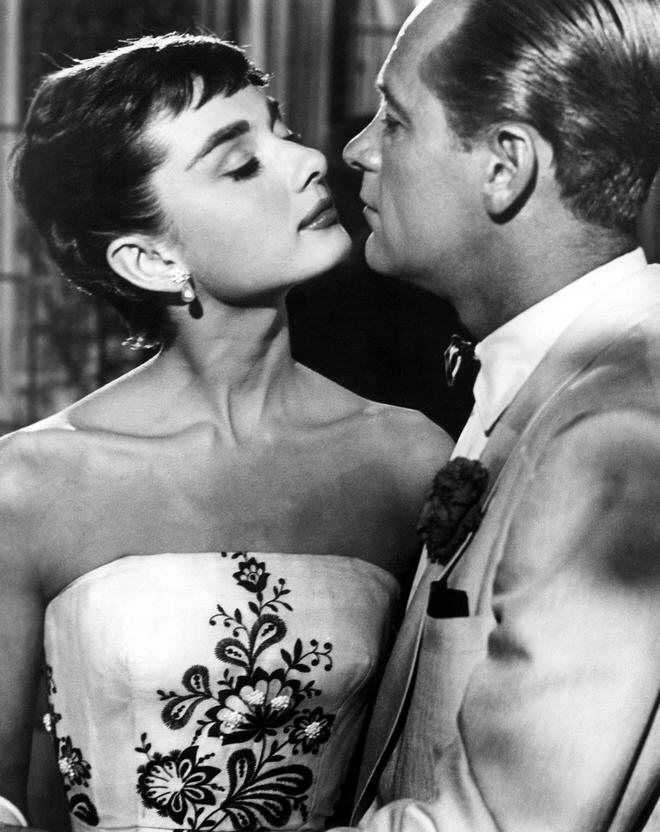
Hepburn and Holden

Sabrina Fairchild is the young daughter of the Larrabee family's chauffeur, Thomas Fairchild, and has been in love with David Larrabee all her life. David, a three-times-married, non-working playboy, has never paid romantic attention to Sabrina. Since she has lived for years on the Larrabee estate on Long Island with her father, to David she is still a child.

Eavesdropping on a party at the mansion the night before she is to leave to attend the Le Cordon Bleu cooking school in Paris, Sabrina watches, follows, and listens as David entices yet another woman into a dark and vacant indoor tennis court. Distraught, she leaves her father a suicide note and then starts all eight cars in the closed garage in order to kill herself. She is passing out from the fumes when Linus, David's older brother, opens the door, discovers her and carries her back to her quarters above the garage. She passes out upon arriving home.

After two years in Paris, Sabrina returns home an attractive, sophisticated woman. When her father is delayed from picking her up at the station, flirtatious David, passing by, offers her a lift without recognizing her. She accepts.

Once David realizes who she is, he is quickly drawn to Sabrina and invites her to join him at a party at the mansion, and then later invites her to the indoor tennis court. When Linus sees this, he fears that David's imminent marriage to the wealthy Elizabeth Tyson may be endangered. If that engagement were broken, it would ruin a profitable opportunity for a great corporate merger between Larrabee Industries and Elizabeth's father's business. Instead of confronting David about his irresponsibility, Linus pretends to sympathize with him. Linus manipulates David to sit down on champagne glasses he has placed in his pockets, and David is incapacitated for a few days.

Linus takes David's place with Sabrina at the tennis court, to explain matters to Sabrina. A hypothetical payoff is discussed and dismissed. Linus kisses Sabrina, who is surprised but pleased. Following that evening Linus plans to entertain Sabrina to distract her from her childhood infatuation. Linus's plan is to send Sabrina back to Paris on the pretense that he will join her there. His intention was to get her on to an ocean liner but then not join her, in order to get her away from David, the family, and the now-threatened merger. However on their third date a conflicted Linus confesses his original intentions to Sabrina, she is hurt but understands the logic of the tactic. She agrees to sail the next day to live in Paris, but without Linus's offered money and other inducements.

The following morning, David confronts Linus in his office (where he has stayed the evening) and tells Linus he knows Linus loves Sabina. Linus has changed his mind decides to send David to Paris with Sabrina instead. This means calling off David's wedding with Elizabeth and the Tyson deal. Linus schedules a meeting of the Larrabee board to announce this. Instead, surprisingly, David enters the meeting room at the last minute and says that he will marry Elizabeth after all. He also helps Linus recognize his own feelings for Sabrina by insulting her and letting Linus punch him in the face. Then, having already arranged a car and a tugboat to wait for Linus, David assists him to rush off and join Sabrina's ship before it leaves the harbor. Linus seeks out Sabrina on board the ship and they sail away together.

== Cast ==
- Humphrey Bogart as Linus Larrabee
- Audrey Hepburn as Sabrina Fairchild
- William Holden as David Larrabee
- Walter Hampden as Oliver Larrabee, Linus and David's father
- John Williams as Thomas Fairchild, Sabrina's father
- Martha Hyer as Elizabeth Tyson, David's fiancée
- Joan Vohs as Gretchen Van Horn
- Marcel Dalio as Baron St. Fontanel
- Marcel Hillaire as The Professor, Sabrina's culinary instructor
- Nella Walker as Maude Larrabee, Linus and David's mother
- Francis X. Bushman as Mr. Tyson, Elizabeth's father
- Ellen Corby as Miss McCardle, Linus's secretary
- Nancy Kulp as Jenny (uncredited), one of the Larrabees' maids

== Production ==
Sketches for skirt, blouse, and apron by Edith Head for Audrey Hepburn in Sabrina

Initially, Cary Grant was considered for the role of Linus, but he declined, and the role was taken by Bogart. Best known for playing tough detectives and adventurers, Bogart was cast against type as a smart businessman gradually transformed into a romantic lead.

During the production of the film, Hepburn and Holden entered a short-lived love affair, unbeknownst to Wilder: "People on the set told me later that Bill and Audrey were having an affair, and everybody knew. Well, not everybody! I didn't know." Bogart had originally wanted his wife Lauren Bacall to be cast as Sabrina. He complained that Hepburn required too many takes to get her dialogue right and pointed out her inexperience. Wilder began shooting before the script was finished, and Lehman was writing all day to complete it. Eventually he would finish a scene in the morning, deliver it during lunch, and filming of it would begin in the afternoon.

Although Edith Head won an Oscar for Best Costumes, most of Hepburn's outfits are rumored to have been created by Hubert de Givenchy and chosen personally by the star. In a 1974 interview, Head stated that she was responsible for creating the dresses, with inspiration from some Givenchy designs that Hepburn liked, but that she made important changes, and the dresses were not by Givenchy. After Head's death, Givenchy stated that Sabrina's iconic black cocktail dress was produced at Paramount under Head's supervision but claimed it was his design.

The film began a lifelong association between Givenchy and Hepburn. It has been reported that when Hepburn called on Givenchy for the first time in Paris, he assumed that it was Katharine Hepburn in his salon.

The location used to portray the Larrabee family's mansion in Glen Cove, New York was 'Hill Grove', the home of George Lewis in Beverly Hills, California. This mansion was demolished during the 1960s. The location used to portray the Glen Cove train station was the Glen Cove train station on the Oyster Bay Branch of the Long Island Rail Road. The building at 30 Broad Street in Manhattan's financial district was used as the location for the headquarters of the Larrabee company.

== Reception ==
The film opened in New York and Los Angeles on September 23, 1954 and was number one at the US box office for two weeks. Bosley Crowther, writing for The New York Times on its original release, lauded the film, thinking it, "in our wistful estimation, the most delightful comedy-romance in years". Crowther also offered praise to Audrey Hepburn's performance, declaring "she is wonderful in it — a young lady of extraordinary range of sensitive and moving expressions within such a frail and slender frame".

Critical reception to Sabrina has been uniformly positive. James Berardinelli gave it 3 out of 4 stars and thought that it "will leave almost all viewers, even those as cold as Linus, with a smile on their lips and a warm glow in their hearts". Variety noted that "the Script is long on glibly quipping dialog, dropped with a seemingly casual air, and broadly played situations. The splendid trouping delivers them style. Leavening the chuckles are tugs at the heart." On film aggregator site Rotten Tomatoes, 90% of critics have given the film a positive review, with an average of 7.8/10 and a sample of 80 reviews. The critical consensus reads "With its humorous script and its stars' immense charm, Sabrina remains a resonant romantic gem."

=== Awards and nominations ===
Award	Category	Nominee(s)	Result	Ref.
Academy Awards	Best Director	Billy Wilder	Nominated	
Academy Awards	Best Actress	Audrey Hepburn	Nominated	
Academy Awards	Best Screenplay	Billy Wilder, Samuel A. Taylor, and Ernest Lehman	Nominated	
Academy Awards	Best Art Direction – Black-and-White	Art Direction: Hal Pereira and Walter H. Tyler; Set Decoration: Samuel M. Comer and Ray Moyer	Nominated	
Academy Awards	Best Cinematography – Black-and-White	Charles Lang	Nominated	
Academy Awards	Best Costume Design – Black-and-White	Edith Head	Won	
British Academy Film Awards	Best British Actress	Audrey Hepburn	Nominated	
Directors Guild of America Awards	Outstanding Directorial Achievement in Motion Pictures	Billy Wilder	Nominated	
Golden Globe Awards	Best Screenplay – Motion Picture	Billy Wilder, Samuel A. Taylor, and Ernest Lehman	Won	
National Board of Review Awards	Top Ten Films		7th Place	
National Board of Review Awards	Best Supporting Actor	John Williams (also for Dial M for Murder)	Won	
National Film Preservation Board	National Film Registry		Inducted	
New York Film Critics Circle Awards	Best Actress	Audrey Hepburn	Nominated	
Writers Guild of America Awards	Best Written American Comedy	Billy Wilder, Samuel A. Taylor, and Ernest Lehman	Won	

== Remakes ==
There have been several Indian adaptations of the film. Manapanthal (1961) was a Tamil version, followed in the same year by a Telugu version, Intiki Deepam Illale. In addition Sabrina was the inspiration for the successful Hindi film Yeh Dillagi (1994), although with some changes to the plot. Sabrina was remade in Turkish as Şoförün Kızı in 1965. In 1995, there was a Hollywood remake from Paramount Pictures.
