= Legend (play) =

1976 Broadway play by Samuel A. Taylor

- Original language: English
- Written by: Samuel A. Taylor
- Genre: Comedy
- Setting: Old West

Premiere
- Place: Ethel Barrymore Theatre

Legend is a play by Samuel A. Taylor. The Broadway production was directed by Robert Drivas and starred Elizabeth Ashley, F. Murray Abraham, and George Dzundza. After 18 previews it opened on May 13, 1976, at the Ethel Barrymore Theatre, where it ran for only five performances.

The comedy is set in the Old West and tells the story of a mysterious, romantic girl who appears in a remote mining town in search of its legendary heroes. She finds what she is seeking in an Outlaw, a Sheriff, a Banker, and the rough but lovable men of the town.

Legend was nominated for the Drama Desk Award for Outstanding Lighting Design (Thomas Skelton) and Outstanding Set Design (Santo Loquasto).
