= Veera Thirumagan =

- Theatrical release poster
- Directed by: A. C. Tirulokchandar
- Written by: A. C. Tirulokchandar
- Produced by: A. V. Meiyappan
- Starring: C. L. Anandan; Sachu; E. V. Saroja
- Music by: Viswanathan–Ramamoorthy
- Production company: Murugan Brothers
- Release date: 3 May 1962
- Country: India
- Language: Tamil
- Budget: ₹13,00,000

Veera Thirumagan is a 1962 Indian Tamil-language historical action film, directed by A. C. Tirulokchandar and produced by Murugan Brothers, a subsidiary of AVM Productions. This was the directorial debut for Tirulokchandar. The film stars C. L. Anandan, Sachu, E. V. Saroja and S. A. Ashokan. It was released on 3 May 1962 and emerged as a moderate success.

== Plot ==
Ravindran gets caught in a complex chain of events when he loses his foster father. He must succeed to the throne from Nagu, the king and the killer of the former king.

== Cast ==
- C. L. Anandan
- Sachu
- E. V. Saroja
- S. A. Ashokan

== Production ==
A. C. Tirulokchandar earlier wrote the screenplay for the hit film, Vijayapuri Veeran, an adaptation of The Three Musketeers. He was introduced by actor S. A. Ashokan to M. Saravanan of AVM Productions, and became very close to the AVM clan, he made his directorial debut with Veera Thirumagan. Former child artist Sachu made her debut as lead actress with this film. While AVM was generally known for producing drama films with contemporary settings, Veera Thirumagan differed from them by being an "action oriented costume drama". Saravanan and Kumaran wanted to make a historical film like Vijayapuri Veeran and American films. Meiyappan refused to produce a historical film on their banner as he felt they need to learn a lot; however after his wife persuaded him to encourage them, he agreed but on the condition that they should produce the film under a new banner called "Murugan Brothers".

According to Saravanan, Veera Thirumagan was the first Tamil film using zoom lens. The song "Roja Magale Rajakumari" was the first song to be recorded before the team went to shoot. That song was shot at Hogenakkal Falls. For the song "Neela Pattadai Katti", Tirulokachander wanted a large lotus flower in the middle of the water surrounded by twenty four lotus leaves with heroine standing in the flower. Aarumuga Aasari, who worked as a carpenter for AVM Studios, spotted a place with backwaters where he built a set with the film's art director Shantaram with two barrels to fill leaves and four barrels with lotus flowers then filling it with water and was shot for 10 days. (Note: S. P. Muthuraman claimed the song was shot at Thuraipakkam, while A. V. M. Kumaran claimed it was shot around Mahabalipuram.) After seeing the song, Meiyappan felt the same song can be shot in colour too hence it was reshot in colour. The outdoor shoot was held at Chandragiri Fort at Andhra Pradesh.

== Soundtrack ==
The music was composed by Viswanathan–Ramamoorthy and lyrics were written by Kannadasan. The songs "Roja Magale Rajakumari" and "Paadatha Paattellam" were well received. The latter song was remixed by Dharan Kumar for Rudhran (2023).

Song	Singers	Length
"Azhagukku Azhagu"	P. Susheela	03:35
"Kettadhu Kidaikkum"	L. R. Eswari	04:20
"Neelapattadai Katti"	P. Susheela, L. R. Eswari	04:32
"Paadatha Pattellam"	P. B. Sreenivas, S. Janaki	03:12
"Roja Malarae"	P. B. Sreenivas, P. Susheela	03:00
"Vethala Potta"	T. M. Soundararajan, Sadan	03:56
"Etruga Dheebam"	P. Susheela	04:58
"Ontodu Ondrai Vaitthaan"	T. M. Soundararajan, P. Leela & M. S. Viswanathan	05:40
"Azhivadhu Pol Thondrum"	G. K. Venkatesh	01:07

== Marketing ==
To promote the film, S. S. Balan of the magazine Ananda Vikatan suggested the makers to promote the film in the magazine as a four-half page advertisement to which they agreed. Similarly, they published six advertisements and four-page advertisements in the form of check at the same time in the magazine Kumudam. It became the first Tamil film whose banner was put up in Mount Road, Madras using neon sign.

== Release and reception ==
Veera Thirumagan was released on 3 May 1962. Kanthan of Kalki said Ashokan was the only actor who performed well, and criticised the film's other aspects, including the cinematography, art direction and music. According to Saravanan, the film was a moderate success.

== Bibliography ==
- Muthuraman, S. P. (2017) [2005]. AVM Thandha SPM (in Tamil) (3rd ed.). Vikatan. OCLC 607342391.
