= C. L. Anandan =

Indian actor

Anandan
- Born: 15 June 1933; Salem, Madras Presidency, British India (present day Tamil Nadu, India)
- Died: 25 March 1989 (aged 55); Madras, Tamil Nadu, India
- Other names: Anandan, Anandhan
- Occupations: Actor; film producer; politician
- Years active: 1952–1988
- Political party: All India Anna Dravida Munnetra Kazhagam (ADMK)
- Spouse: Lakshmi Anandan
- Children: 7 incl. Disco Shanti, Lalitha Kumari and Jai Varma
- Relatives: Srihari (son-in-law)

Anandan (15 June 1933 – 25 March 1989), was an Indian actor and producer who was active in Tamil cinema as well in Malayalam cinema during the second half of the 20th century. He was well known for his hero, supporting, and villain roles. In a career spanning close to three decades, he acted in about 60 films in Tamil and Malayalam, in which 25 films had him as hero. Anandan debuted in a supporting role in the Tamil movie Thandhai, and later he holds the heroic role in Vijayapuri Veeran. He made a move on the Malayalam film industry; Kaattumaina was his first Malayalam movie, which was also re-shot in Tamil. He appeared in a song sequence "Us Paar Saajan" as a fisherman dancer from the Hindi film Chori Chori (1956).

== Early life ==
Anandan was born in Salem, Tamil Nadu. His mother tongue is Tamil.

== Personal life ==
Anandan married Lakshmi, The couple has four daughters and three sons. Anandan is the father of actresses Disco Shanti and Lalitha Kumari.

== Film career ==
Initially, C. L. Anandan was doing supporting roles in many films. He was introduced by Citadel Films as the hero in their production Vijayapuri Veeran, released in the year 1960. He won the hearts of the cine-goers through his versatility, which he displayed in sword fighting and horse-riding. He reached heights through his film Veerathirumagan, released in the year 1962. The film catapulted him to the film industry's big league of happening stars. The film helped his heroine Sachu also climb the rungs of the success ladder. He owned his own production company known as "Aanandan Movies", where the movie Nanum Manidhandhaan was his first production. He was frequently paired with actress Rajasree in most of his films such as Lorry Driver, Magaley Un Samathu, Kubera Theevu, Sengamala Theevu and Yanai Valartha Vanampadi Magan.

== Filmography ==
C. L. Anandan acted in about 60 films in Tamil and Malayalam.

This list is complete.

=== Tamil ===
1. Thandhai (1953)
2. Thangamalai Ragasiyam (1957)
3. Vijayapuri Veeran (1960)
4. Kongunattu Thangam (1961)
5. Naagamalai Azhagi (1962) [Guest Appearance]
6. Veerathirumagan (1962)
7. Neeya Naana? (1962)
8. Sengamala Theevu (1962)
9. Kubera Theevu (1963)
10. Kaattumaina (1963)
11. Nanum Manidhandhaan (1964)
12. Magaley Un Samathu (1964)
13. Kalyana Mandapam (1965)
14. Maganey Kel (1965)
15. Lorry Driver (1966)
16. Yaar Nee? (1966) [Guest Appearance]
17. Thayin Mel Aanai (1966)
18. Thanippiravi (1966)
19. Ethirigal Jakkirathai (1967)
20. Ninaivil Nindraval (1967)
21. Moondrezhuthu (1968)
22. Ponnu Mappillai (1969)
23. Atthai Magal (1969)
24. Naangu Killadigal (1969)
25. Manasatchi (1969)
26. CID Shankar (1970)
27. Thulli Odum Pulliman (1971)
28. Deivam Pesuma (1971)
29. Neerum Neruppum (1971)
30. Yanai Valartha Vanampadi Magan (1971)
31. Jakkamma (1972)
32. Malai Naattu Mangai (1973)
33. Chittu Kuruvi (1978)
34. Vallavan Varugiran (1979)
35. Naan Potta Savaal (1980)
36. Kanni Theevu (1981)
37. Kodugal Illatha Kolam (1983)
38. Thanikattu Raja (1983)
39. Adutha Varisu (1983)
40. Madurai Sooran (1984)
41. Madras Vathiyar (1984)
42. Oomai Vizhigal (1986)
43. Elan Kandru (1985)
44. Ketti Melam (1985)
45. Senthoora Poove (1988) as Ponni's father

=== Malayalam ===
1. Achan (1952)
2. Kaattumaina (1963)
3. Kaattumallika (1966)
4. Aana Valarthiya Vanampadiyude Makan (1971)
5. Prathikaram (1972)
6. Kaadu (1973)
7. Vanadevatha (1976) as Sathram Watcher

=== Hindi ===
1. Chori Chori (1956)
