= Deivame Thunai =

- Directed by: Ch. Narayanamurthy
- Screenplay by: K. M. Govindarajan
- Starring: A. Nageswara Rao; Padmini; T. R. Ramachandran; M. N. Nambiar
- Music by: S. M. Subbaiah Naidu
- Production company: S. P. S. Pictures
- Release date: 31 October 1959
- Country: India
- Language: Tamil

Deivame Thunai (transl. God is saviour) is a 1959 Indian Tamil-language film, directed by Ch. Narayanamurthi. The film stars Akkineni Nageswara Rao and Padmini.

== Plot ==
Parvathi is a pretty and good-natured girl. Her auntie's son Rathinam is a cunning and duplicitous person. Rathinam wants to marry Parvathi, but she did not agree. Parvathi's cousin Sekar arranges to marry her to his friend Shankar. Rathinam gets furious and tries to abduct Parvathi. He gets caught and sent to prison. Shankar and Parvathi get married and beget a son. Rathinam returns from jail. He wants to destroy the happy life Parvathi is enjoying with her husband and child. He sends a letter to Shankar with lies about Parvathi's conduct before marriage. Shankar believes it and leaves the family. Parvathi takes refuge at Sekar's house with her son, Ravi. But Sekar's wife ill-treats her. In the meantime, Shankar goes to Chennai. He saves a girl, Padma, who is a social worker, from a thief while travelling in the train. Padma and her father asks him to stay in their house, but he refuses. Shankar becomes a singer in the radio station. he gets addicted to liquor, but before it becomes serious, Padma rescues him and makes him to stay in their house. Parvathi, unable to bear Sekar's wife, leaves home and goes to Chennai. She joins as a house maid in the house of Rajani, a friend of Padma. Parvathi admits Ravi to a school run by Padma. Ravi is a brilliant student and takes part in school activities. Padma and Shankar become fond of him and quite often, they bring him home. Ravi acts in a drama that is staged during a school function. Parvathi attends the function and sees Shankar there. Parvathi asks Rajani about Shankar. Rajani tells her that he is a person rescued by Padma and that they are going to get married. Parvathi is shocked and runs to the sea to commit suicide. What happens next forms the rest of the story.

== Cast ==
List adapted from the film's song book.

Male cast

- A. Nageswara Rao
- T. R. Ramachandran
- M. N. Nambiar
- V. R. Rajagopal
- K. Sarangapani
- Appa Duraisamy
- M. R. Swaminathan
- K. K. Perumal
- Rama Rao
- Desigan
- Master Gopal
- Master Anantharaman
- Master Ganesan

Female cast

- Padmini
- Ragini
- E. V. Saroja
- M. S. Sundari Bai
- K. S. Angamuthu
- G. Lakshmirajyam
- Baby Premalatha
- Baby Meenakumari
- Baby Kanchana
- Baby Jaya

Dancers

- E. V. Saroja
- Gopi Krishna

== Production ==
The film was produced by S. P. S. Pictures managed by R. Sockalingam and was directed by Ch. Narayanamurthi. K. M. Govindarajan wrote the screenplay and dialogues. Choreography was handled by Hiralal, P. S. Gopalakrishnan, Sampath and Chinni Lal.

== Soundtrack ==
Music was composed by S. M. Subbaiah Naidu.

Song	Singer/s	Lyricist	Duration (m:ss)
"Sonnaal Thaan Theriyumaa"	P. Leela	Velavan	
"Chinnakutti Nadaiyai Paaru"	P. Leela	A. Maruthakasi	
"Vadamadurai Mannan"; Musical play	S. Janaki, Soolamangalam Rajalakshmi, Kamala & Kumar	A. Maruthakasi	
"Maaname Pradhaanam"	T. M. Soundararajan	A. Maruthakasi	
"Manamalare Kanirasame"	P. Susheela	A. Maruthakasi	
"Jegatheeswariye Naalum"	P. Susheela	Ka. Mu. Sheriff	
"Malaraadha Malarellaam Malarave"	T. M. Soundararajan & P. Susheela	Ka. Mu. Sheriff	
"O Raja Ennai Paaru"	A. L. Raghavan & S. Janaki	Kadhiroli	
