= Kanni Theevu =

1981 Tamil Film

- Title card
- Directed by: T. R. Ramanna
- Screenplay by: Kanagashanmugam
- Starring: Jaishankar; Radhika
- Cinematography: J. G. Vijayam Jothi
- Edited by: V. Rajagopal
- Music by: Ilaiyaraaja
- Production company: Sri Ayvar Arts Films
- Release date: 10 April 1981
- Running time: 111 minutes
- Country: India
- Language: Tamil

Kanni Theevu (transl. Virgo Island) is a 1981 Indian Tamil-language action thriller film, directed by T. R. Ramanna and produced by Sri Ayvar Arts films. The film stars Jaishankar, Radhika, C. L. Anandan, and Seema. It was released on 10 April 1981.

== Cast ==
- Jaishankar as Pandiyan
- Radhika as Selvi
- Seema as Rani
- C. L. Anandan as Albert
- Vennira Aadai Moorthy as Kannan
- Ranjeet as Kali
- Kumar Raja as Simon
- R. N. Sudarshan as Scientist Arun
- Ennatha Kannaiya as Rajarathnam
- Isari Velan as Rathnavel
- Vijayachandrika
- M.B. Shetty
- Jayshree T. as Dancer

== Soundtrack ==
The songs were written by Panchu Arunachalam and music composed by Ilaiyaraaja.

Title	Singer(s)	Duration
"Hey Onna Rendaa"	Malaysia Vasudevan, Saibaba, S. P. Sailaja	4:32
"Ithu Oru Pudhu Vitha"	S. Janaki	4:23
"Kandane Kandane Kaatil"	Malaysia Vasudevan, S. P. Sailaja	4:22
"Ponnana Neram Raja"	S. Janaki	4:05

== Reception ==
Nalini Sastry of Kalki called the film an unhealthy child with a mixture of Vitthalacharya style and Hollywood science fiction.
