= Sengamala Theevu =

1962 film by S. Rajendran

- Film poster
- Directed by: S. Rajendran
- Screenplay by: Salem Natarajan
- Story by: Saaptoor Aiyadurai
- Produced by: M. A. Venu
- Starring: M. R. Radha; C. L. Anandan; Rajasree; T. P. Muthulakshmi
- Music by: K. V. Mahadevan
- Production company: M. A. V. Pictures
- Release date: 1962
- Country: India
- Language: Tamil

Sengamala Theevu (transl. Red Lotus Island) is a 1962 Indian Tamil-language action film directed by S. Rajendran. The film stars M. R. Radha, C. L. Anandan, Rajasree and Pushpalatha.

== Cast ==
The following list is compiled from the book Thiraikalanjiyam Part 2 and from the film credits.

Male cast

- M. R. Radha
- C. L. Anandan
- Kallapart Natarajan
- V. K. Ramasamy
- V. S. Raghavan

Male cast (Contd.)

- Stunt Krishnan
- K. Kannan
- K. R. Rathinam
- R. Pakkirisamy
- S. V. Ramdas
- Kundu Karupaiah,

Female cast

- Rajasree
- Pushpalatha
- S. Kalavathi
- T. P. Muthulakshmi
- Indra

== Production ==
The film was produced by M. A. Venu under his own banner M. A. V. Pictures and was directed by S. Rajendran. The story was written by Saaptoor Aiyadurai while the screenplay and dialogues were penned by Salem Natarajan. The film was made at Salem Ratna Studios. Development began as early as 1956 with a largely different cast and crew.

== Soundtrack ==
Music was composed by K. V. Mahadevan. The songs "Malarai Parithaai Thalaiyil Vaithaai" and "Sindhithaal Sirippu Varum" attained popularity.

Song	Singer/s	Lyricist	Length
"Ennai Paarthaa Parihaasam"	P. B. Srinivas	Thiruchi Thiyagarajan	03:30
"Yemaatha Therinjavan Sugavaasi"	S. V. Ponnusamy	Thiruchi Thiyagarajan	
"Sindhithaal Sirippu Varum"	T. M. Soundararajan	Thiruchi Thiyagarajan	03:37
"Kannaal Pesuvom, Kaiyai Veesuvom"	Soolamangalam Rajalakshmi & L. R. Eswari	Thiruchi Thiyagarajan	03:17
"Paaduvom Poomalai Sooduvom"	Soolamangalam Rajalakshmi & L. R. Eswari	Thiruchi Thiyagarajan	02:17
"Malarai Parithaai Thalaiyil Vaithaai"	P. B. Srinivas & L. R. Eswari	Thiruchi Thiyagarajan	03:28
"Pesiyathu Naanillai Kangal Thaane"	M. S. Rajeswari	Ekalaivan	03:15
"Pakalil Pesum Nilavinai Kanden"	T. M. Soundararajan & S. Janaki	Ekalaivan	03:11
"Naan Onru Ninaithen Nadakkavillai"	S. Janaki	Ekalaivan	03:44
