= Thanikattu Raja =

- Theatrical release poster
- Directed by: V. C. Guhanathan
- Written by: V. C. Guhannathan
- Produced by: D. Ramanaidu
- Starring: Rajinikanth; Sridevi; Sripriya; Jaishankar
- Cinematography: P. S. Nivas
- Edited by: K. M. Marthand
- Music by: Ilaiyaraaja
- Production company: Suresh Productions
- Release date: 12 March 1982
- Running time: 153 minutes
- Country: India
- Language: Tamil

Thanikattu Raja (transl. The Lone Forest King) is a 1982 Indian Tamil-language action film written and directed by V. C. Guhanathan, and Produced by D. Ramanaidu. It stars Rajinikanth, Sridevi and Sripriya, with Jaishankar, Vijayakumar, Sathyakala and Y. G. Mahendran in supporting roles. The film had music by Ilaiyaraaja and cinematography handled by P. S. Nivas.

== Plot ==
Soori is a rebellious young man who works as a mechanic and often lands in trouble fighting for justice. He falls in love with a rich girl Vaani, but Vaani's father plots to break their relationship through his manager Vasu. In the ensuing melee, Soori murders the manager to save Vaani's honour. Soori is about to be sentenced to death and Vaani finds that the only way she can save Soori is by marrying a rich, roguish man Ethiraj who uses his money to get Soori's death penalty commuted to a prison term.

After his release, Soori is distraught at losing Vaani and takes to drinking. He moves to his village where he becomes immensely popular among the villagers due to his righteous work and progressive activities. He offers protection to a village damsel Vidhya to escape from being forced to be a prostitute and later marries her but still remains alcoholic. Vaani meets and advises him to stop drinking and turn over a new leaf. Despite being abused by her husband and falsely accused of hobnobbing with Soori, Vaani maintains the sanctity of her marriage. Whether Soori and Vaani's lives return to normal forms the rest of the story.

== Cast ==
- Rajinikanth as Surya Prakash
- Jaishankar as Ethiraj
- Vijayakumar as Vasu
- Sridevi as Vani
- Sripriya as Vidhya
- Major Sundarrajan as Jayaprakash
- Sangili Murugan as Vadivelu
- Y. G. Mahendran as Ravi
- Senthamarai as Landlord
- V. K. Ramasamy as 'Salaiyur' S.K.R
- Vennira Aadai Moorthy as Kannisamy
- Thengai Srinivasan as Siva (Kanakkupillai)
- R. S. Manohar as Rajasekhar
- Sathyakala as Seetha
- Rajesh as Ethiraj's brother
- K . Kannan as Paranthaman
- Master Haja Sheriff
- K. Natraj as Village people
- C. L. Anandhan as Henchman
- Oru Viral Krishna Rao as Tea shop owner
- M. R. R. Vasu as Uncle of Vidya
- Usilai Mani as Village people
- Y. Vijaya as Madhavi
- Idichapuli Selvaraj as Ponnusamy
- Jr. Manohar as Friend of Soori
- I. S. Ramachandran as Ramu
- V. Gopalakrishnan as Sangaralingam
- Silk Smitha as (Special Appearance)

== Production ==
Thanikattu Raja does not credit any actors; instead it features the text "Ungal Abhimana Natchathirangal" (Your favourite stars) due to the film's ensemble cast.

== Themes ==
According to Jump Cut, Thanikattu Raja "explores the connections between landlords and politicians, who together oppress the rural population".

== Soundtrack ==
Tamil

The soundtrack was composed by Ilaiyaraaja and had six songs. "Mullai Arumbe" did not feature in the film but was part of the album. The lyrics for the songs were written by Vaali and Panchu Arunachalam.

Title	Lyrics	Singer(s)	Length
"Naan Thaan Taapu"	Vaali	S. P. Balasubrahmanyam, S. Janaki	4:32
"Santhana Kaatre	Vaali	S. P. Balasubrahmanyam, S. Janaki	3:47
"Naan Thanda Ippo Devadas"	Vaali	S. P. Balasubrahmanyam	4:23
"Koovungal Sevalgale"	Vaali	S. P. Balasubrahmanyam	4:30
"Rasave Unna Naan Ennithan"	Vaali	S. P. Sailaja	4:29
"Mullai Arumbe"	Panchu Arunachalam	Malaysia Vasudevan, S. Janaki	4:24

Hindi

Brij Bihari wrote the lyrics for all the songs in the Hindi dubbed version.

Title	Singer(s)	Length
"Aaj Ka Dada Main Ban Gaya"	Shailendra Singh	4:23
"Dafli Baje Kya Kahe"	Shailendra Singh	4:30
"Dil Kya Jaan Bhi"	S. P. Balasubrahmanyam, Vani Jayaram	4:32
"Khilti Kali Yeh Roop Tera"	Mahendra Kapoor, Alka Yagnik	3:47
"Saanson Mein Sargam"	Alka Yagnik	4:29

== Release and reception ==
The film was released on 12 March 1982. Thiraignani of Kalki felt the plot which spoke about village has been dealt sparsely and also felt Jaishankar, Sripriya and Sridevi were underutilised; however, he praised the stunt choreography.
