= Kubera Theevu =

- Directed by: G. Viswanathan
- Written by: Maa. Raa.
- Produced by: Nalam Seshu Kanchana
- Starring: C. L. Anandan; Devika; Nagesh; Pandari Bai
- Music by: C. N. Pandurangan
- Production company: Nithyakalyani Films
- Release date: 1963
- Country: India
- Language: Tamil

Kubera Theevu (transl. Kubera Island) is a 1963 Indian Tamil language film directed by G. Viswanathan. The film featured C. L. Anandan, Devika, Nagesh and Pandari Bai in the main roles.

== Plot ==
After a gang of thieves attacks their family and tragically separates them from their mother, two young boys are raised by the most unlikely guardians.

== Cast ==
The list is adapted from the book Thiraikalanjiyam Part 2.

Male cast

- C. L. Anandan
- Nagesh
- S. A. Ashokan
- Rama Rao

Female cast

- Devika
- Rajasree
- Pandari Bai
- Rajahs
- Manorama

Guest artistes

- V. Nagayya
- S. A. Natarajan
- Rajanala

== Production ==
The film was produced by Nalam Seshu Kanchana under the banner Nithyakalyani Films and was directed by G. Viswanathan. Maa. Raa. wrote the story and dialogues.

== Soundtrack ==
Music was composed by C. N. Pandurangan. The song "Ilam Kanni" is based on "Aai Aai Aa Suku Suku" from the Hindi film Junglee.

Song	Singer/s	Lyricist	Length
"Navasakthiye Gnanasakthiye"	P. Leela	Kannadasan	
"Vidhiyennum Kuzhandhai Vilaiyaaduthu"	Sirkazhi Govindarajan	Veppathur Krishnan	
"Ilam Kanni Unai Kaana Vandhaal"	S. Janaki	Villiputhan	03:17
"Kankanda Selvam Inge"	A. G. Rathnamala & group	Villiputhan	
"Veeraa Varuveeraa...Naane Varuvene"	K. Jamuna Rani	Thiruchi Thiyagarajan	03:41
"Ammaa Vendumaa Unakkor"	T. M. Soundararajan	Kannadasan	05:44
