= Rathinapuri Ilavarasi =

- Film poster
- Directed by: T. R. Ramanna
- Written by: Thuraiyur K. Murthi; K. Shanmugam
- Starring: T. R. Mahalingam; M. R. Radha; E. V. Saroja
- Cinematography: T. K. Rajabathar
- Music by: Viswanathan–Ramamoorthy
- Production company: Sri Vinayaka Pictures
- Release date: 13 April 1960
- Running time: 169 minutes
- Country: India
- Language: Tamil

Rathinapuri Ilavarasi (transl. Princess of Rathinapuri) is a 1960 Indian Tamil-language film, directed by T. R. Ramanna. The film stars M. R. Radha, T. R. Mahalingam and E. V. Saroja. It was released on 13 April 1960.

== Plot ==
Nandivarman is a relative of a King. He lives a life of pleasure and was imprisoned for a misdeed. However, he escapes from the prison and roams all over many places. Once he wins a competition and takes possession of a dancer. He also becomes the ruler of a small kingdom and continues his playboy-type living. The rest of the story deals with how he finally meets his deserved end.

== Cast ==
Male cast

- M. R. Radha
- T. R. Mahalingam
- Ashokan
- Ennatha Kannaiya
- C. V. V. Panthulu
- G. Pattu Iyer
- Sayeeram
- Balakrishnan
- Sathyamoorthy
- Natarajan
- Swami
- T. V. Sedhuraman

Female cast

- M. V. Rajamma
- E. V. Saroja
- Sasi-Kala (Madras Sisters)
- Kusalakumari
- Padmini Priyadarshini
- Gemini Chandra
- Jyothi
- Mallika
- Mohana
- C. S. Saroja
- Ambika

== Production ==
The film was produced under the banner Sri Vinayaka Pictures and was directed by T. R. Ramanna. His brother T. K. Rajapathar was in charge of cinematography. Editing was done by M. V. Rajan and M. Durairajan. P. S. Moorthi, Gopalakrishnan and Dandayuthapani pillai were in charge of Choreography. The film was shot at Vijaya-Vauhini and Vikram studios and was processed at Vijaya Laboratory.

== Soundtrack ==
Music was composed by the duo Viswanathan–Ramamoorthy and the lyrics were penned by Pattukkottai Kalyanasundaram.

| Song | Singer/s | Length |
|---|---|---|
| "Sengol Nilaikkave" | Thiruchi Loganathan & A. P. Komala | |
| "Anna Theevin Azhagu Rani Naan" "Maanthoppu Veettukkaari" "Paar Muzhuvathume Nam Per" | K. Jamuna Rani; P. Leela; S. Janaki | 05:53 |
| "Enendru Ketkave.... Porumai Oru Naal" | T. R. Mahalingam | 03:27 |
| "Buddham Saranam.... Kuzhandhai Valarvadhu" | T. M. Soundararajan & P. Susheela | 05:27 |
| "Anbu Thirumaniye Agamalare" | P. Susheela | |
| "Aadumayile Nee Aadumayile" | P. Susheela | 03:31 |
| "Enge Unmai Ennaade" | P. Susheela | |
| "Aiyaa Naan Aadum Naadagam" | K. Jamuna Rani | 04:28 |
| "Devi Manampole Sevai Purinthaale" | K. Jamuna Rani | 04:37 |
| "Kaadhalukku Naangu Kangal" | T. R. Mahalingam | 03:32 |
| "Padikka Padikka Nenjil Inikkum" | T. R. Mahalingam & S. Janaki | 04:05 |
| "Ilamai Ezhil Thigalum" | T. R. Mahalingam | 03:21 |

Naraanthakudu (Telugu) Songs

The music was composed by Pamarthi. Lyrics were by Sri Sri.

All the tunes for all the songs for both languages are the same.

| Song | Singer/s | Length |
|---|---|---|
| "Kshira Sagaramandu" | | |
| "Nenī Divinelu Raanine" | K. Rani, Swarnalatha & Sunandha | 05:53 |
| | | 03:27 |
| | | 05:27 |
| "Marala marala yeda" | S. Janaki | |
| "Aadumu Cheli Ni" | P.Susheela | 03:31 |
| "Ledhaa Guna Mee Dhesaana" | P. Susheela | |
| "Aahaa Nenaadu Naatakamu" | K. Jamuna Rani | 04:28 |
| "Devī Manamooge Jeevamula" | K. Jamuna Rani | 04:37 |
| "Shishuve Repati Maanisi Meti" | Ghantasala | 03:32 |
| | | 04:05 |
| | | 03:21 |
