= Kalyana Mandapam (1965 film) =

1965 Indian historical drama film

- Theatrical release poster
- Directed by: Maa. Raa.
- Screenplay by: Maa. Raa.
- Produced by: Maa. Raa. K. Jagannathan; D. Subramaniam
- Starring: C. L. Anandan; Ravichandran; K. R. Vijaya; M. S. Malathi
- Cinematography: M. Karnan
- Edited by: R. Devarajan
- Music by: R. Parthasarathy
- Production company: Dhanalakshmi Theatres
- Release date: 24 September 1965
- Country: India
- Language: Tamil

Kalyana Mandapam (transl. Wedding Hall) is a 1965 Indian Tamil-language historical drama film produced by Dhanalakshmi Theatres. The film was directed by Maa. Raa. and stars C. L. Anandan, Ravichandran, K. R. Vijaya and M. S. Malathi. It was released on 24 September 1965.

== Plot ==
A young prince, Prathaban, who, when he is about to be crowned, is denied the kingdom by some conspirators who allege that he is an imposter and there is another true prince. Prathaban vows that he will prove his claim and goes in search of his identity. He meets a mystic who gives him a talisman. One day when Prathaban was sleeping in an abandoned building, he meets a spirit. He believes it is the spirit of his dead mother and keeps it inside the talisman. But someone takes away the talisman. Prathaban continues his journey and on his way meets a girl, Anandhi and they fall in love. It turns out that Anandhi is a princess. Prathaban is imprisoned for loving Anandhi. How he establishes his identity and regains his Kingdom forms the rest of the story.

== Cast ==
List adapted from the database of Film News Anandan and from the film's song book.

Male Cast

- C. L. Anandan
- Ravichandran
- Rajavelu
- Parthiban

Female cast

- K. R. Vijaya
- M. S. Malathi
- Kalpana Devi
- Vimala

Guest artistes

- R. S. Manohar
- Nagesh
- Manorama

== Production ==
The film was produced by Maa. Raa., a popular writer who also directed and wrote the story and dialogues. K. Jagannathan and D. Subramaniam also joined Maa. Raa. as producers. Cinematography was handled by M. Karnan while R. Devarajan was in charge of editing. T. S. Rangasamy was in charge of audiography. Art direction was by Angamuthu and choreography was done by Chinnilal, Sampathkumar, Rajkumar and Jayaraman. The film was shot at Sharadha Studios.

== Soundtrack ==
Music was composed by R. Parthasarathy.

Song	Singer/s	Lyricist
"Poothirukkum Vizhiyeduthu"	P. B. Srinivas & P. Susheela	Thellur Dharmarajan
"Unnaithaan Thedivandhen"	L. R. Eswari	Thellur Dharmarajan
"En Pillai Mugam Therigiradhu"	S. Janaki	Vaali
"Pasum Pul Tharaiyil"	P. Susheela	Vaali
"Naan Unnai Thodalaam"	T. M. Soundararajan & P. Susheela	Vaali

== Reception ==
The Indian Express wrote, "Not only the story, which is a costume fantasy but even the style of acting too reminds one of conventions now obsolete." Kalki called it a waste of time.
