= Samuel A. Taylor =

American screenwriter (1912–2000)

- Born: Samuel Albert Tanenbaum; June 13, 1912; Chicago, Illinois, United States
- Died: May 26, 2000 (aged 87); Blue Hill, Maine, United States
- Occupations: Playwright, screenwriter
- Spouse: Suzanne Combes Taylor (1940–2000)

Samuel A. Taylor (June 13, 1912 – May 26, 2000) was an American playwright and screenwriter.

== Biography ==
Born Samuel Albert Tanenbaum to a Jewish family in Chicago, Illinois, Taylor made his Broadway debut as author of the play The Happy Time in 1950. He wrote the play Sabrina Fair (1953) and co-wrote its film adaptation released the following year. In 1955, he won a Golden Globe and was nominated for an Academy Award for the screenplay. His early success brought him more work in Hollywood, including the biographical film The Eddy Duchin Story (1956) and the Alfred Hitchcock classic Vertigo (1958).

His film career faded after the initial underperformance of Vertigo, though Hitchcock and Taylor remained frequent collaborators. He was often contracted to write drafts for Hitchcock's later films, such as Torn Curtain (1966), and wrote the script for Topaz (1969).

Taylor was nominated for his only Tony Award as co-producer of the musical play No Strings (1962), for which he also wrote the book. Other playwrighting credits include Avanti! (1968), which was later adapted for the Billy Wilder film released in 1972, and Legend (1976).

Taylor died of heart failure in Blue Hill, Maine. His credits are sometimes confused with those of novelist and screenwriter Samuel W. Taylor.

== Broadway credits ==
- The Happy Time (1951)
- Nina (1951)
- Sabrina Fair (1953)
- The Pleasure of His Company (1958)
- First Love (1961)
- No Strings (1962)
- Beekman Place (1964)
- Avanti! (1968)
- Legend (1976)

== Additional screenwriting credits ==
- Sabrina (1954)
- The Eddy Duchin Story (1956)
- The Monte Carlo Story (1956; also directed)
- Vertigo (1958)
- Goodbye Again (1961)
- The Love Machine (1971)
- Avanti! (1972)
