= Vijayapuri Veeran =

- Poster
- Directed by: Joseph Thaliath Jr.
- Screenplay by: A. C. Tirulokchandar
- Based on: The Three Musketeers by Alexandre Dumas
- Produced by: Joseph Thomas
- Starring: C. L. Anandan; M. Hemalatha; S. A. Ashokan; S. V. Ramadas
- Cinematography: R. N. Pillai
- Edited by: P. V. Karunakaran
- Music by: T. R. Pappa
- Production company: Citadel Film Corporation
- Release date: 12 February 1960
- Country: India
- Language: Tamil

Vijayapuri Veeran (transl. The Warrior of Vijayapuri) is a 1960 Indian Tamil-language swashbuckler film directed by Joseph Thaliath Jr. and written by A. C. Tirulokchandar. An adaptation of the novel The Three Musketeers by Alexandre Dumas, it stars C. L. Anandan (in his acting debut), M. Hemalatha, S. A. Ashokan and S. V. Ramadas in lead roles.

== Cast ==
Male cast

- C. L. Anand as Anandan
- S. A. Ashokan B.A. as Nanjappan
- S. V. Ramadas as Veera Nathan
- Pandi Selvaraj as Kavi Gnananathan
- Tiruchi Ganesan as Vijayapuri King
- S. Rama Rao as Aathi
- P. B. Vairam as Maya's spy
- Stunt Swaminathan as Ellappan
- Master Gopal as Azhagapuri King

Female cast

- M. Hemalatha as Kanchana Devi
- Kamini as Maya Devi
- R. Chandrakantha as Shanthi
- T. Shanmugasundari as Jothi

Dance

- V. N. jothy
- Rajeswari
- Sakunthala
- Madhuri Devi

== Production ==
Vijayapuri Veeran, an adaptation of the Alexandre Dumas novel The Three Musketeers, was directed by Joseph Thaliath Jr., written by A. C. Tirulokchandar and produced by Joseph Thomas under Citadel Film Corporation. The dialogues were written by Nanjilnaadu T. N. Rajappa, cinematography was handled by R. N. Pillai, and editing by P. V. Karunakaran. The cast featured mainly newcomers such as C. L. Anandan, M. Hemalatha, Kamini, R. Chandrakantha, S. V. Ramadas, Pandi Selvaraj and S. Rama Rao.

== Soundtrack ==
The music was composed by T. R. Pappa and lyrics were written by Thanjai N. Ramaiah Dass, K. D. Santhanam and M. K. Aathmanathan.

Songs	Singers	Lyrics	Length
"Ullatthile Uram Venumadaa"	A. M. Rajah		03:25
"Isai Paadum Thendralodu"	A. M. Rajah & Jikki		03:28
"Aalai Paaru Kannaley Aadam"	P. Susheela		05:12
"Aasai Machchan Visuvasa Machchan"	S. Janaki & S. C. Krishnan		04:36
"Solla Venuma Innum Sollavenuma"	A. M. Rajah & Jikki		03:17
"Kokkarthichuk Koondu Payum"	S. C. Krishnan, T. V. Rathnam & L. R. Eswari		04:06
"Vaaniley Malarnthidum Valarmadhiye"	Sirkazhi Govindarajan		01:47
"Inbam Konjam Vennila"	A. P. Komala		01:15

== Release and reception ==
Vijayapuri Veeran was released on 12 February 1960, and emerged a commercial success.
