= Sabrina Fair =

Play written by Samuel A. Taylor

- First edition 1954
- Original language: English
- Written by: Samuel A. Taylor
- Characters: Linus Larrabee Jr. Sabrina Fairchild; David Larrabee; Maude Larrabee; Julia Ward McKinlock; Linus Larrabee Sr. Margaret; Gretchen; Mr. Fairchild; A Young Woman; A Young Man; Another Young Woman; Another Young Man; Paul D'Argenson
- Genre: Romantic comedy
- Setting: The North Shore of Long Island about an hour from New York.

Premiere
- Date: November 11, 1953
- Place: National Theatre; New York City; New York

Sabrina Fair (subtitled A Woman of the World) is a romantic comedy written by Samuel A. Taylor and produced by the Playwrights' Company. It ran on Broadway for a total of 318 performances, opening at the National Theatre on November 11, 1953. Directed by H. C. Potter, with sets and lights designed by Donald Oenslager, it starred Margaret Sullavan and Joseph Cotten, with Cathleen Nesbitt, John Cromwell, and Russell Collins in major supporting roles.

The critic for The New York Times, Brooks Atkinson, praised both the script and the production for its droll wit, writing that "One of the most attractive qualities of Sabrina Fair is the opportunity it provides for enjoying the foibles and crises of some fairly scrupulous human beings." For Atkinson, the play's clever dialogue placed it beyond a Cinderella romance and into the more exalted realm of high comedy, in the tradition of S. N. Behrman, Philip Barry, and W. Somerset Maugham.

The play has been adapted into three films, a 1954 version starring Audrey Hepburn, a 1994 Indian version, Yeh Dillagi starring Kajol, Akshay Kumar, and Saif Ali Khan, and a 1995 remake with Julia Ormond.

== Plot ==
Sabrina Fairchild is the daughter of a chauffeur to the wealthy Larrabee family, who live in a mansion on the North Shore of Long Island. Returning from a stay in Paris after working as the private secretary to the "Assistant Economic Commissioner Office of Special Representative for Europe Economic Cooperation Administration", she presents herself as a young woman of beauty, charm, incredible sophistication and zest for living, so different from the domestic's daughter the family had largely ignored. She proclaims her desire "to do everything and see everything, sense everything; to know that life is an enormous experience and must be used. To be in the world, and of the world, and never stand aside and watch."

Although she once had a crush on David Larrabee, the young playboy of the family, and returns to America with a wealthy French suitor in tow, she finds herself drawn to Linus Larrabee, whose intelligence, lack of sentimentality, and knowledge of the world stimulate her. He, of all the Larabees, is the one she is attracted by. When it is revealed that Sabrina's father has amassed a fortune on the stock market over the past decades, she wants to return to Paris, which she feels is her home. As her financial, as well as intellectual, equal, she falls in love with Linus.

The title cites John Milton's song from his masque Comus (1634), which is quoted in the play:

Sabrina fair,
Listen where thou art sitting
Under the glassy, cool, translucent wave,
In twisted braids of lilies knitting
The loose train of thy amber-dropping hair;
Listen for dear honour's sake,
Goddess of the silver lake,
Listen and save.

With its patrician setting, witty dialogue, and development of a romantic plot between two clever and committed idealists across class lines, Sabrina Fair has much in common with Philip Barry's 1928 comedy Holiday.

== Films ==
The play is the basis for the 1954 film Sabrina, directed by Billy Wilder, and its 1995 remake of the same name directed by Sydney Pollack. Wilder's extensive revision of the plot led to Taylor's quitting the project and his replacement by Ernest Lehman.
