= Bhakta Prahlada (1967 film) =

1967 film by Chitrapu Narayana Rao

- Theatrical release poster
- Directed by: Chitrapu Narayana Rao
- Written by: D. V. Narasa Raju
- Produced by: A. V. Meiyappan; M. Murugan; M. Kumaran; M. Saravanan
- Starring: S. V. Ranga Rao; Anjali Devi; Roja Ramani
- Cinematography: A. Vincent
- Edited by: R. Vittal
- Music by: S. Rajeswara Rao
- Production company: AVM Productions
- Distributed by: Navayuga Films
- Release date: 12 January 1967
- Running time: 170 minutes
- Country: India
- Language: Telugu

Bhakta Prahlada (transl. Prahlada, the Devotee) is a 1967 Indian Telugu-language devotional film directed by Chitrapu Narayana Rao based on a script by D. V. Narasa Raju. It stars S. V. Ranga Rao and Anjali Devi. Roja Ramani, in her film debut, plays the title character. Bhakta Prahlada is produced on the AVM Productions banner by A. V. Meiyappan and his sons, M. Murugan, M. Kumaran and M. Saravanan. The film is based on the legend of Prahlada, a character in Bhagavata Purana known for his devotion to the Hindu god Vishnu.

Bhakta Prahlada is the third Telugu film based on Prahlada, after the 1932 and 1942 films of the same name. Unlike the earlier two, which were filmed in black-and-white, this version was shot in Eastman Color Negative film. Its script was completed by May 1965. Since Bhakta Prahlada and Ave Kallu were simultaneously produced by AVM Productions, principal photography and post-production were delayed and lasted for one-and-a-half years.

Bhakta Prahlada, released on 12 January 1967, was a commercial success and completed a hundred-day run in theatres. It received the Nandi Award for Third Best Feature Film. The film was mostly dubbed into Tamil with the same title and into Hindi (as Bhakt Prahlad) that year, with small changes in the cast.

== Plot ==
Jaya and Vijaya, the gatekeepers of Vaikuntha, fail to recognise the Four Kumaras and deny them entry to the abode of Lord Vishnu. Angered, the Kumaras curse them to lose their divinity and be reborn on Earth as mortals. Vishnu offers them a choice: seven human births as his devotees, or three as his sworn enemies. Preferring a shorter separation from Vishnu, they choose the latter.

In their first incarnation, they are born as demon brothers Hiranyakashipu and Hiranyaksha to sage Kashyapa and Diti during an inauspicious twilight hour. Hiranyaksha torments the Earth, prompting the goddess Bhudevi to seek Vishnu's intervention. Vishnu manifests as the Varaha avatar, slays Hiranyaksha, and restores the Earth from Garbhodaka. Seeking revenge, Hiranyakashipu performs intense penance to Lord Brahma and receives a boon granting him near-immortality, protecting him from being killed by man or beast and under conventional circumstances.

Meanwhile, Indra attempts to slay Hiranyakashipu's pregnant wife, Leelavathi, but the sage Narada intervenes and shelters her at his ashram, where she gives birth to Prahlada. Five years later, Prahlada is sent to the gurukulam of Chanda and Amarka. Despite his demon lineage, Prahlada remains an ardent devotee of Vishnu, whom he addresses as Srihari.

When Hiranyakashipu learns of his son's devotion, he orders Prahlada to renounce Vishnu, whom he blames for his brother's death. Prahlada refuses, so Hiranyakashipu subjects him to various lethal punishments, including starvation, being trampled by elephants, being hurled from a cliff, exposure to venomous snakes, being thrown into the sea while bound, and being forced to drink poison. Through divine intervention, Prahlada survives each attempt unharmed.

Hiranyakashipu eventually demands that Prahlada reveal where his deity resides. Prahlada declares that Srihari is omnipresent. Enraged, Hiranyakashipu strikes a palace pillar with his mace to disprove the claim. Vishnu emerges from it as Narasimha, an enraged half-man, half-lion avatar, and slays Hiranyakashipu at twilight on the palace threshold, thereby fulfilling the conditions of Brahma's boon.

Pacified by Prahlada's prayers, Narasimha resumes his serene form as Srihari, crowns Prahlada king, and advises him to rule virtuously.

== Cast ==
Male cast

- S. V. Ranga Rao as Hiranyakashipu
- M. Balamuralikrishna as Narada
- Relangi as Chanda
- Padmanabham as Amarka
- Haranath as Vishnu
- Dhulipala Seetarama Sastry as Indra
- Ramana Reddy as a snake charmer
- V. Sivaram as Kashyapa
- V. Nagayya as Shukracharya (cameo appearance)
- Vijayakumar as one of the Four Kumaras

Female cast

- Anjali Devi as Leelavathi
- Jayanthi as Diti
- T. Kanakam as a snake charmer
- Baby Roja Ramani as Prahlada
- L. Vijayalakshmi as a dancer in Hiranyakashipu's court
- Gitanjali as Menaka
- Vijaya Lalitha as Urvashi
- Vennira Aadai Nirmala as Tilottama
- Shanta as Rambha
- Vanisri as folk dancer (Tamil version)

T. S. Balaiah and A. Karunanidhi played the role of Prahlada's mentors in the Tamil version. Rajendra Nath played the same role, named Dhumal, in the Hindi version.

== Production ==
=== Development ===
A fan of stories based on children, AVM Productions founder A. V. Meiyappan wanted to produce a film based on the legend of Prahlada (a character in Bhagavata Purana known for his devotion to the Hindu god Vishnu) with his sons M. Kumaran, M. Saravanan and M. Murugan. Encouraged by the success of Naadi Aada Janme (1965), the Telugu remake of his Tamil production Naanum Oru Penn (1963), Meiyappan decided to produce Bhaktha Prahlada in Telugu. According to Kumaran, Meiyappan believed that mythological films were more appreciated by the Telugu audience than they were by the Tamil diaspora.

D. V. Narasa Raju wrote the film's story and screenplay, since Meiyappan wanted a more contemporary and dramatic approach. Unlike the 1932 and 1942 Telugu films of the same name which were filmed in black-and-white, Meiyappan wanted this version to be filmed in colour. Chitrapu Narayana Rao, who directed the 1942 film, approached Meiyappan in May 1965 and asked to direct a film. Meiyappan signed him as director for Bhaktha Prahlada, since Narayana Rao was in financial straits due to the failure of his Krishna Kuchela (1961). S. Rajeswara Rao composed the film's soundtrack and background score. A. Vincent handled the cinematography, R. Vittal edited the film and A. K. Sekhar was its art director.

=== Casting ===
S. V. Ranga Rao and Anjali Devi were cast as the demon king Hiranyakashipu and his wife, Leelavathi (Kayadhu in Bhagavata Purana). The producers held an audition for the role of Prahlada, inviting many children in and around Madras (now Chennai) to AVM Studios. Roja Ramani was cast as Prahlada after a screen test and a song rehearsal in which she held a live snake. She was recommended to Meiyappan by her father Satyam's employer, an editor of the now-defunct magazine Cinema Rangam in Madras. Since Ramani was pale and thin, the producers approached a nutritionist to help her meet the role's requirements.

Singer M. Balamuralikrishna was cast as the sage Narada, making his acting debut in film. When his choice was criticised (because of Balamuralikrishna's height), Meiyappan retorted that the casting was apt since the role would be used for comic effect. Haranath played the role of Vishnu. Relangi and Padmanabham were cast as Prahlada's teachers, Chanda and Amarka. Ramana Reddy and T. Kanakam were signed as snake charmers for a key scene. L. Vijayalakshmi played the royal dancer in Hiranyakashipu's court; Shanta, Vijaya Lalitha, Gitanjali, and Vennira Aadai Nirmala were cast as the apsaras (celestial dancers) Rambha, Urvashi, Menaka and Tilottama, respectively.

=== Filming ===
Bhaktha Prahlada was shot in Eastman Color Negative film, and was AVM's second colour film, after Anbe Vaa (1966). Although the script was completed by May 1965, the principal photography and post-production phases lasted for one-and-a-half years. Meiyappan produced another Telugu film, Ave Kallu (a remake of his 1967 Tamil production Athey Kangal), simultaneously with Bhaktha Prahlada. His sons were more interested in Ave Kallu than Bhaktha Prahlada, uncertain of the latter's commercial viability. When Sekhar showed the set designs to Meiyappan and his sons before building them, they rejected them in favour of Ave Kallu. Filming was delayed, and the cast and crew became impatient and frustrated towards the end of production.

During filming, Ramani was trained by "Rangoon" Ramarao (who played Amarka in the 1942 film) in dialogue diction. In the scene where the snake charmers place a snake on Prahlada's shoulders, a trained wheat-coloured snake was used during rehearsals and a black cobra was chosen for the filming. For the scene where elephants are forced to trample Prahlada, a child stunt artiste from the Great Oriental Circus was initially engaged as Ramani's double. The child was dismissed when Ramani began crying, however, and she performed the scene herself. Balamuralikrishna remembered filming a scene as Narada: "I had to stand on a stool without proper balancing, and I go up (into the "sky") as someone raises it up on a jack. I precariously stand there with a fear that I'd fall off the stool but I should not show it in my face – I should instead sing with a smiling face!"

Narayana Rao was reluctant to direct the film's climactic scene, since he could not forget Hiranyakashipu's death scene in a stage play in where the actor playing Narasimha was emotionally involved. Murugan directed the scene according to Meiyappan's wishes, and a double was engaged for Ranga Rao for the climactic scene. Meiyappan, dissatisfied with the overall result, took close-up shots of Ranga Rao to make the scene look authentic. Gopalakrishnan and K. S. Reddy choreographed the film's dance scenes. According to cinematographer A. Vincent, to achieve the "pillar split effect" in the scene where Narasimha emerges from a pillar and kills Hiranyakashipu "we marked each frame increasing the markings step by step". Vincent described it as the "one-turn work", and the scene was shot with a Mitchell camera. The film's final cut was 5,078 metres (16,660 ft) in length.

== Soundtrack ==
S. Rajeswara Rao composed the film's soundtrack and background score, assisted by Rajagopal and Krishnan. Bhaktha Prahlada's soundtrack consisted of 23 songs, and poems from Andhra Maha Bhagavatham (the Telugu translation of Bhagavatha Purana by the 15th-century poet Pothana. Samudrala Sr., Samudrala Jr., Kosaraju Raghavaiah, Palagummi Padmaraju, Daasarathi Krishnamacharyulu and Aarudhra wrote the song lyrics. "Varamosage Vanamali" was composed using Bihag raga and sung by Balamuralikrishna. "Kanulaku Veluguvu Neeve" was based on the Mohana and Abheri ragas.

The soundtrack, released by His Master's Voice, was critically praised. "Jeevamu Neeve Kadha", "Raara Priya Sundara", "Janani Varadayini Trilochani" and "Sirisiri Laali Chinnari Laali" became popular after the film's release. Among the poems, the renditions of "Kaladambodhi" and "Indhugaladu Andhuledanu" were praised by critics.

Telugu tracklist
No.	Title	Lyrics	Singer(s)	Length
1.	"Raara Priya Sundara"	Daasarathi Krishnamacharyulu	P. Susheela	04:20
2.	"Bhujashakthi Nathoda" (Poem from Andhra Maha Bhagavatham)	Pothana	Madhavapeddi Satyam	00:57
3.	"Janani Varadayini Trilochani"	Palagummi Padmaraju	S. Janaki	03:20
4.	"Aadhi Anadhiyu Neeve Deva"	Daasarathi Krishnamacharyulu	M. Balamuralikrishna	03:02
5.	"Sirisiri Lali Chinnari Lali"	Aarudhra	S. Janaki, M. Balamuralikrishna	03:36
6.	"Galira Kumbhini" (Poem from Andhra Maha Bhagavatham)	Pothana	Madhavapeddi Satyam	01:03
7.	"Jayaho Jayaho"	Samudrala Jr.	P. Susheela, S. Janaki, Sulamangalam Rajalakshmi	03:25
8.	"Hiranyakashipuni Divya Charithamu"	Kosaraju Raghavaiah	Madhavapeddi Satyam, Pithapuram Nageswara Rao	05:08
9.	"Chettu Meedha Oka Chilakundhi"	Kosaraju Raghavaiah	P. Susheela	02:14
10.	"Karunaleni Manasu"	Daasarathi Krishnamacharyulu	P. Susheela	00:35
11.	"Om Agnimeele Purohitham" (Adapted from the Rigveda)	NA	Padma, Subramanya Sastry	03:31
12.	"Chadhivinchiri" (Poem from Andhra Maha Bhagavatham)	Pothana	P. Susheela	00:31
13.	"Mandara Makaranda" (Poem from Andhra Maha Bhagavatham)	Pothana	P. Susheela	01:41
14.	"Kanjakshunakugani" (Poem from Andhra Maha Bhagavatham)	Pothana	P. Susheela	01:30
15.	"Patuthara Neethi" (Poem from Andhra Maha Bhagavatham)	Pothana	Madhavapeddi Satyam	00:51
16.	"Varamosage Vanamali"	Samudrala Sr.	M. Balamuralikrishna	02:58
17.	"Om Namo Narayanaya"	Samudrala Sr.	P. Susheela, Chorus	03:48
18.	"Balayuthulaku" (Poem from Andhra Maha Bhagavatham)	Pothana	P. Susheela	00:59
19.	"Kanulaku Veluguvu Neeve"	Samudrala Sr.	P. Susheela, S. Janaki	03:56
20.	"Aadhukovayya O Ramesha"	Samudrala Sr.	P. Susheela, Chorus	08:26
21.	"Panchabdambulavadu" (Poem from Andhra Maha Bhagavatham)	Pothana	Madhavapeddi Satyam	00:36
22.	"Jeevamu Neeve Kadha"	Samudrala Sr.	P. Susheela	10:02
23.	"Ninnegani Parulaberumga"	Samudrala Sr.	P. Susheela	03:14
24.	"Hey Prabo Hey Prabo Lakshmi Vallabha"	Samudrala Sr.	P. Susheela	02:39
25.	"Pamulollamayya"	Kosaraju Raghavaiah	L. R. Eswari, Pithapuram Nageswara Rao	03:14
26.	"Ninne Nammi"	Samudrala Sr.	P. Susheela	01:28
27.	"Madhilo Velilo Cheekati"	Samudrala Sr.	P. Susheela	00:53
28.	"Bhavajaladhinibadi Thelagaleni"	Samudrala Sr.	P. Susheela	02:19
29.	"Munchithi" (Poem from Andhra Maha Bhagavatham)	Pothana	Madhavapeddi Satyam	01:59
30.	"Vishwamunindi Velige Neeve"	Samudrala Sr.	P. Susheela	02:15
31.	"Kaladambodhi" (Poem from Andhra Maha Bhagavatham)	Pothana	P. Susheela	00:39
32.	"Indhugaladu Andhuledanu" (Poem from Andhra Maha Bhagavatham)	Pothana	P. Susheela	00:22
33.	"Sri Manini Mandira"	Samudrala Sr.	P. Susheela	02:06
34.	"Yella Sareera Dharulaku" (Poem from Andhra Maha Bhagavatham)	Pothana	P. Susheela	00:50
Total length:				01:28:27

The Tamil version of the soundtrack has lyrics by Thiruchi Thiyagarajan, Vaali, Ku. Ma. Balasubramaniam, V. Seetharaman and Alangudi Somu.

Tamil tracklist
No.	Title	Lyrics	Singer(s)	Length
1.	"Raajan Maharaajane"	Vaali	P. Susheela
2.	"Kili Vandhu Kothaada Koyyaa"	Vaali	P. Susheela
3.	"Devi Devi Thaaye"	Ku. Ma. Balasubramaniam	S. Janaki
4.	"Hey Jothi Swaroopa"	Ku. Ma. Balasubramaniam	P. Susheela, S. Janaki
5.	"Aadhi Anaadhiyum Neeye"	Thiruchi Thiyagarajan	Balamuralikrishna
6.	"Chinna Chinna Kanne"	Thiruchi Thiyagarajan	Balamuralikrishna, S. Janaki and group
7.	"Aazhi Soozh Vannaa"	Thiruchi Thiyagarajan	P. Susheela and group
8.	"Jeevanum Neeye Aiyaa"	Thiruchi Thiyagarajan	P. Susheela
9.	"Lakshmi Vallabha Dheena Dhayalaa"	Thiruchi Thiyagarajan	P. Susheela
10.	"Unnai Nambi Un Patham Thuthithe"	Thiruchi Thiyagarajan	P. Susheela
11.	"Vaazhgave Mannulagum Vinnulagum"	V. Seetharaman	P. Susheela, S. Janaki, Soolamangalam Rajalakshmi
12.	"Thimikida Thimikida Vaadhya"	V. Seetharaman	T. M. Soundararajan, A. L. Raghavan
13.	"Karunai Serndha Manadhu"	V. Seetharaman	P. Susheela
14.	"Irul Niraindhadhaai Irukkum"	V. Seetharaman	P. Susheela
15.	"Endhan Uyir Thandha Hari"	V. Seetharaman	P. Susheela
16.	"Om Namo Narayana .. Naarayana Mandram Adhuve"	Alangudi Somu	P. Susheela and group

== Release and reception ==
Bhaktha Prahlada was released on 12 January 1967. The film was distributed in the Andhra Pradesh, Madras and Nizam regions by Navayuga Films. (Note: For film-trade purposes, the Nizam region includes the districts of Kalaburagi, Bidar, and Raichur in Karnataka; seven districts in the Marathwada region (Aurangabad, Latur, Nanded, Parbhani, Beed, Jalna and Osmanabad), and the state of Telangana.) The first copy was screened for President Sarvepalli Radhakrishnan, who praised the performances of its cast (particularly Ramani's). A reviewer writing for Andhra Prabha on 22 January 1967, compared the film with the earlier two films of the same name and opined the 1967 film was a better made version. They stated that in addition to better technology, the stellar performances of Ranga Rao, Anjali and Ramani set it apart. Reviewing the Tamil version, Kalki praised it for the colour sequences, photography and Ramani's performance. Bhaktha Prahlada was a commercial success, completing a 100-day theatrical run. It received the Nandi Award for Third Best Feature Film in 1967.

== Other versions ==
The film was dubbed into Tamil with the same title and into Hindi as Bhakt Prahlad, with scenes related to Chanda-Amarka re-shot with different actors. A. Karunanidhi and T. S. Balaiah played Chanda-Amarka in the Tamil version, and were replaced by Rajendra Nath and Dumal in the Hindi version. The Tamil version had dialogues by Aaroor Dass, and was distributed by AVM themselves. The Tamil and Hindi versions were released on 24 March and 2 November 1967, respectively. The dubbed Kannada version, also entitled Bhakta Prahlada, was released by AVM on 26 March 1974.

== Bibliography ==
- Saravanan, M. (2013) [2005]. AVM 60 Cinema (in Tamil) (3rd ed.). Rajarajan Pathippagam. OCLC 1158347612.
