= Dr. Rajkumar Award =

Indian film lifetime achievement award

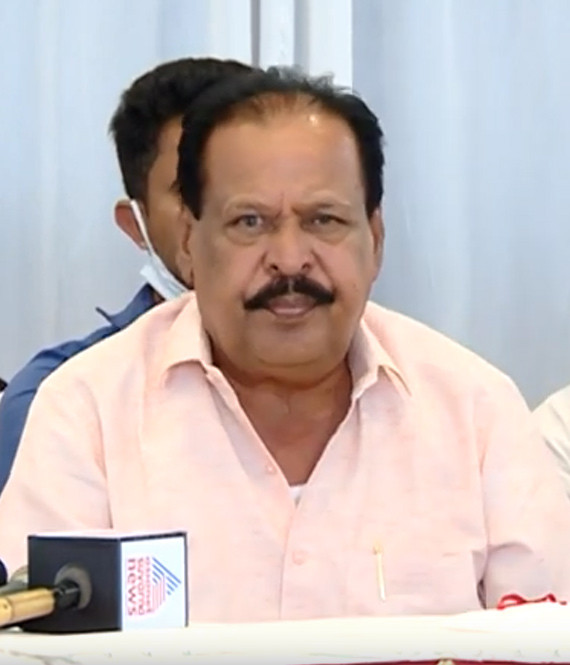
- Most recent recipient: Sa. Ra. Govindu
- Awarded for: "Outstanding contribution to the growth and development of Kannada cinema"
- Sponsored by: Government of Karnataka
- Rewards: Gold Medal); Certificate; ₹500,000 (US$5,300)
- Most recent winner: Sa. Ra. Govindu

Highlights
- Total awarded: 28
- First winner: K. S. Ashwath

This is a list of winners of the Karnataka State's Dr. Rajkumar Award. Rajkumar was one of Indian cinema's most successful actors. Honouring his memory, the award is presented annually during the Karnataka State Awards function.

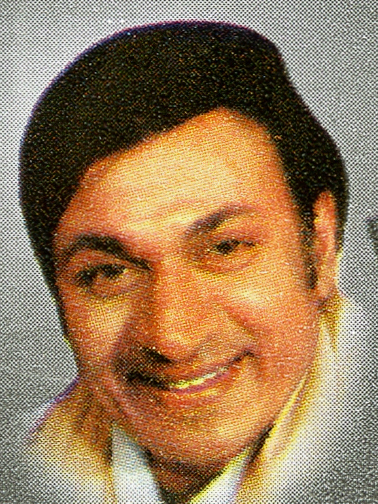
Dr. Rajkumar was one of Indian cinema's most successful actors.

== Recipients ==
Year	Image	Winner	Ref
1993–94		K. S. Ashwath	
1994–95		Pandari Bai	
1995–96	–	R. Lakshman	
1996–97	–	M. N. Basavarajaiah	
1997–98		M. V. Rajamma	
1998–99	–	U. S. Vadiraj	
1999–2000		Leelavathi	
2000–01		Vijaya Bhaskar	
2001–02		Prathima Devi	
2002–03	–	K. C. N. Gowda	
2003–04	–	K. Janakiram	
2004–05		M. P. Shankar	
2005–06	–	Jayanthi	
2006–07		M. N. Lakshmi Devi	
2007–08		Vishnuvardhan	
2008–09		B. Saroja Devi	
2009–10		R. N. Sudarshan	
2010–11	–	S. Shivaram	
2011		Hamsalekha	
2012	–	M. Bhaktavatsala	
2013		Srinath	
2014	–	Basanth Kumar Patil	
2015	–	Harini	
2016	–	Advani Lakshmi Devi	
2017		Lakshmi	
2018	–	Srinivasa Murthy	
2019		Umashree	

== See also ==
- Karnataka State Film Awards
- Karnataka State Film Award for Best Film
