= Anbe Aaruyire =

Anbe Aaruyire may refer to:

- Anbe Aaruyire (1975 film), 1975 Tamil film
- Anbe Aaruyire (2005 film), 2005 Tamil film
