= Door Gagan Ki Chhaon Mein =

1964 film by Kishore Kumar

- Poster
- Directed by: Kishore Kumar
- Written by: Kishore Kumar
- Produced by: Kishore Kumar
- Starring: Kishore Kumar; Supriya Devi; Amit Kumar
- Cinematography: Aloke Dasgupta
- Music by: Kishore Kumar
- Production company: Kishore Films
- Release date: 1964
- Running time: 153 minutes
- Country: India
- Language: Hindi

Door Gagan Ki Chhaon Mein (/ðuːr/ transl. Far Away Under the Shadow of the Sky) is a 1964 Indian Hindi-language drama film directed, produced and written by Kishore Kumar. He also stars, along with Supriya Devi and Amit Kumar. Door Gagan Ki Chhaon Mein, an adaptation of the American film The Proud Rebel (1958), was released in 1964 and gained critical acclaim, but failed commercially. It was later remade in Tamil as Ramu (1966) in Telugu with that same title (1968), and in Malayalam as Babumon (1975).

== Plot ==
Shankar, a soldier, returns from war, only to find that his family has died in a fire, and the sole survivor is his infant son Ramu, left mute by the incident. When Shankar is attacked by the Thakur's men, he is rescued by a woman named Meera, and they fall in love. This provokes further trouble from the Thakur whose son wants to marry Meera.

== Cast ==
- Kishore Kumar as Shankar
- Supriya Devi as Meera
- Amit Kumar as Ramu
- Iftekhar as Jagga
- Moni Chatterjee as Dr. Somnath
- Leela Mishra as Jamuna
- Nana Palshikar as Pagla
- Raj Mehra as Thakur
- Sajjan as Deepa
- Hiralal as Vikram
- Sujit Kumar as Dr. D'Silva
- Shashikala
- S.N. Banerjee
- Nirmal Kumar
- Jeevankala as Village Girl (Jeevankala)
- Radheshyam as Shambhu
- Kesari as Totaram(as Kesri)
- Bhattacharya as Nandu(as Nandu Bhattacharya)
- B. Banerjee as Dr. Banerjee
- Mirza Musharraf as Photographer Pinto
- Meena Talpade as Village Girl (Meena Talpade)

== Production ==
Door Gagan Ki Chhaon Mein was the directorial debut of Kishore Kumar, who also worked as producer, writer and lead actor. The film was based on the 1958 American film The Proud Rebel directed by Michael Curtiz. Kumar also took inspiration from the 1955 Bengali film Pather Panchali, which he saw at least 13 times before making Door Gagan Ki Chhaon Mein. Although Kumar was then known primarily for acting in comedy films, he cast himself against type this time by portraying the melancholic role of Shankar, a demobbed soldier. Regarding his choice to make such a melancholic film, Kumar said, "There's sadness in the heart of even a comedian." His son Amit played the role of Shankar's son Ramu, and Supriya Devi portrayed Meera, the woman Shankar falls in love with after she rescues him from an attack. Devi said she accepted to work on the film because of its offbeat nature. Aloke Dasgupta was the cinematographer, and Ramesh Pant wrote the dialogue. According to Amit, his father's fascination for the word "door" (meaning far) was the reason behind the film receiving its title. He also said that, despite Kumar facing adverse remarks from his friends while making the film, he managed to complete it "against all odds".

== Soundtrack ==
The soundtrack was composed by Kishore Kumar who also worked as lyricist, along with Shailendra. The song "Aa Chalke Tujhe", written by the former, attained popularity. R. D. Burman played the harmonica.

Track listing
No.	Title	Lyrics	Singer(s)	Length
1.	"Aa Chalke Tujhe"	Kishore Kumar	Kishore Kumar	4:42
2.	"Jin Raaton Ki Bhor" (Raga Bhairavi)	Shailendra	Kishore Kumar	3:57
3.	"Khoya Khoya Chanda"	Shailendra	Asha Bhosle	3:47
4.	"Koi Lauta De Mere" (Raga Ahir Bhairav)	Shailendra	Kishore Kumar	3:33
5.	"O Jag Ke Rakhwale"	Shailendra	Manna Dey	4:50
6.	"Path Bhoola Ek Aaya"	Shailendra	Asha Bhosle	2:38
7.	"Chhod Meri Baiyan"	Shailendra	Asha Bhosle	3:24
8.	"Rahi Tu Ruk Mat Jana"	Shailendra	Hemant Kumar	3:01
9.	"Door Gagan Ki Chhaon Mein"	Shailendra	Hemant Kumar	3:09
10.	"Aa Chal Ke Tujhe" (instrumental)	–	–	4:01
Total length:				39:12

== Release and reception ==
Door Gagan Ki Chhaon Mein was released in 1964, and received critical acclaim. Baburao Patel, then the editor of Filmindia magazine, wrote, "Door Gagan Ki Chhaon Mein just misses out on being a classic". However, it was not commercially successful. When officials suggested that Kumar give them bribes so that the film would be entered for the National Film Awards, Kumar refused.

== BFJA (Bengal Film Journalist' Association Awards) ==
Although Door Gagan Ki Chhaon Mein could not be entered for the National Film Awards and perhaps could have had a chance to be a nominee or winner, Door Gagan Ki Chhaon Mein became the 8th best Indian film of 1964 in order of merit in the 28th Annual BFJA Awards but never won an award in any category.

== Remakes ==
Door Gagan Ki Chhaon Mein was remade in Tamil as Ramu (1966). The remake was commercially successful, and won the National Film Award for Best Feature Film in Tamil. Kishore Kumar's brother Ashok Kumar praised Ramu screenwriter Javar Seetharaman for making suitable changes to the screenplay. The film was also remade in Telugu with that same title in 1968, and in Malayalam as Babumon (1975).

== Bibliography ==
- Rajadhyaksha, Ashish; Willemen, Paul (1998) [1994]. Encyclopaedia of Indian Cinema. British Film Institute and Oxford University Press. ISBN 0-19-563579-5.
- Saravanan, M. (2013) [2005]. AVM 60 Cinema (in Tamil) (3rd ed.). Rajarajan Pathippagam. OCLC 1158347612.
