= Ramu (1968 film) =

- Theatrical release poster
- Directed by: A. C. Tirulokchandar
- Written by: D. V. Narasa Raju (dialogues)
- Screenplay by: Javar Seetharaman
- Story by: Kishore Kumar
- Based on: Door Gagan Ki Chhaon Mein (1964)
- Produced by: M. Murugan; M. Kumaran; M. Saravanan; M. Balasubramanian; M. S. Guhan
- Starring: N. T. Rama Rao; Jamuna
- Cinematography: D. Rajagopal
- Edited by: R. G. Gopu
- Music by: R. Govardhanam
- Production company: AVM Productions
- Release date: 4 May 1968
- Running time: 172 minutes
- Country: India
- Language: Telugu

Ramu is a 1968 Indian Telugu-language drama film produced by AVM Productions and directed by A. C. Tirulokchandar. The film stars N. T. Rama Rao and Jamuna with Master Rajkumar in the title role reprising his role from the Tamil film. The film's music was composed by R. Govardhanam. It is a remake of the Tamil film of the same name (1966), which was based on the Hindi film Door Gagan Ki Chhaon Mein (1964) which was not successful. However, this telugu film was a silver jubilee hit.

== Cast ==
- N. T. Rama Rao as Raja
- Jamuna as Lakshmi
- S. V. Ranga Rao as Gopalam
- V. Nagayya as Swamiji
- Relangi as Ganganna
- Ramana Reddy as Armugam
- Rajanala as Ranganna
- Satyanarayana as Puli
- Padmanabham as Venkanna
- Allu Ramalingaiah as Lawyer
- Master Rajkumar as Ramu
- S. V. Ramadas as Sipayi Singanna
- Perumallu as Chinnayya
- Suryakantham as Manikyam
- Geetanjali as Ratnam
- Pushpalatha as Seeta

== Music ==
Music was composed by R. Govardhanam.

Song title	Lyrics	Singers	length
"Pacchani Chettu"	Aarudhra	P. Susheela	3:01
"Thaaraa Shashaankam"	Kosaraju	Pithapuram, Madhavapeddi Satyam, L. R. Eswari, R. Tilakam	7:41
"Pacchani Chettu" – 2	Aarudhra	Ghantasala, P. Susheela	3:40
"Kalaganti Kalaganti"	Dasaradhi	Ghantasala, P. Susheela	5:00
"Maamidi Komma"	Dasaradhi	P. Susheela	3:31
"Raaraa Krishnayya"	Dasaradhi	Ghantasala	5:37

== Release and reception ==
Ramu was released on 4 May 1968. The film had a 100-day run 15 centers. running for 181 days at Durga Kala Mandir, Vijayawada, and becoming a silver jubilee hit.

== Bibliography ==
- Saravanan, M. (2013) [2005]. AVM 60 Cinema (in Tamil) (3rd ed.). Rajarajan Pathippagam. OCLC 1158347612.
