= Ave Kallu =

1967 film by A. C. Tirulokchandar

- Theatrical release poster
- Directed by: A. C. Trilokchandar
- Story by: A. C. Trilokchandar
- Dialogues by: D. V. Narasa Raju
- Produced by: A. V. Meiyappan
- Starring: Krishna; Kanchana
- Cinematography: S. Maruti Rao
- Edited by: R. G. Gope
- Music by: Vedha
- Production company: AVM Productions
- Release date: 14 December 1967
- Running time: 152 minutes
- Country: India
- Language: Telugu

Ave Kallu (transl. The same eyes) is a 1967 Indian Telugu-language crime mystery film directed by A. C. Trilokchandar and produced by AVM Productions. The film features Krishna and Kanchana in the lead roles, with supporting performances from Rajanala, Gummadi, Padmanabham, Ramana Reddy, Nagabhushanam, and Geethanjali. The plot revolves around a series of mysterious murders in a girl's family, with her lover attempting to identify the killer after only being able to see the murderer's eyes.

The film was made simultaneously in Tamil as Athey Kangal, with Kanchana reprising her role in both versions. Ave Kallu was released on 14 December 1967. Though the film did not achieve major success during its initial release, it gained recognition and earned more revenue in subsequent runs.

Ave Kallu is notable for being the first Telugu crime film to be entirely made in colour. Additionally, the song "Maa Oollo Oka Paduchundhi" became popular and remains a well-known classic.

== Plot ==
On the night of a party, Vasantha discovers her husband Ranganatham dead and narrowly escapes an attempt on her life by a masked murderer. In shock, Vasantha becomes mentally paralysed. A police investigation, led by a police inspector, follows the incident.

Meanwhile, Susila (Susi), a college student from Madras, arrives at the house for her holidays, along with her friends. She lives with her three younger paternal uncles: Ranganatham (the victim in the opening scene), Rajasekhar, and Chandrasekhar. Also residing in the house are her aunt Vasantha, who was almost the murderer's next victim, and the butler Naganna. The house is frequently visited by Ramayya, an old Ayurvedic doctor and close family friend. Susi's parents had died long ago, leaving her under the care of her uncles and aunt.

During her stay, a series of murders occur at the house, with the murderer leaving a cigar bit at each crime scene. Vasantha, the only eyewitness to the murderer, is placed under tight security but is eventually killed. The murderer frequently calls Susi, threatening that she will be his next target. Susi is disturbed by the incidents at her home and the threatening phone calls.

Afterwards, Susi meets Bhaskar, a young man who eventually falls in love with her and promises to help. Bhaskar investigates Chandrasekhar and later Rajasekhar, following Rajasekhar to a strange house where a woman wanders like a ghost. She is revealed to be Rajasekhar's lover, whom he had rescued years ago after she attempted suicide. Rajasekhar had kept their relationship secret, as he wanted Susi to marry first before he could marry his lover.

To lure the murderer, Bhaskar sends everyone away for the night. As expected, the murderer attempts to kill Susi, but Bhaskar fails to unmask him, only seeing his eyes before the murderer escapes, leaving his mask behind. Then, the doorbell rings and Bhaskar answers, only to find Chandrasekhar murdered at the doorstep.

Rajasekhar wants everyone to vacate the house after celebrating Susi's birthday party. During the party, the murderer shoots at Susi but misses. Bhaskar chases him but loses track. He finds Ramayya injured in the garden who tells him that the masked man attacked him and ran away. The family begins to theorise the motive behind the murders and discuss the identity of the killer. Ramayya urges Rajasekhar to tell about his family’s past, which leads to the revelation that Rajasekhar’s father had an extramarital affair with a woman who bore him a son. When Rajasekhar's father was on his deathbed, the woman's son was turned away by Rajasekhar’s elder brother (Susi’s father). The woman and her son allegedly died 15 years ago in a fire set by Susi's father.

Bhaskar deduces that the son may have survived the fire and is now seeking vengeance as the murderer. Since the murders are taking place 15 years after the fire, and the murderer appears to be about 25 years old, Bhaskar’s theory is confirmed. He believes the murderer is present in the room with them, as he has seen the murderer's eyes multiple times. Bhaskar has everyone line up and places the murderer’s mask on each man’s face to compare the eyes. He eventually exposes Ramayya as the murderer, who had used prosthetics to disguise himself.

Ramayya confirms Bhaskar’s theory, revealing that he survived the fire and witnessed his mother dying in the flames. He swore vengeance on the family and has been killing them ever since. When Ramayya attempts to kill Rajasekhar and Susi, Bhaskar intervenes, and a fight ensues. The murderer escapes, but Bhaskar chases him. In the ensuing struggle, the police shoot Ramayya, and he disappears into a tunnel in the garden. The family discovers a secret room beneath the garden that leads to the murderer’s hideout, realising it was the secret escape route used after each murder. A tearful Rajasekhar sees the murderer's dead body and acknowledges him as his brother, and the film ends with Bhaskar marrying Susi and staying happily in the house, while Rajasekhar marries his lover.

== Cast ==
- Krishna as Bhaskar
- Kanchana as Susila "Susi"
- Rajanala as Rajasekhar
- Padmanabham as Nityanandam
- Ramana Reddy as Naganna
- Gummadi as Inspector
- Nagabhushanam as Doctor
- S. V. Ramadas as Chandrasekhar
- Typist Gopu as Baby
- Anand Mohan is Driver
- Geethanjali as Julie
- Vennira Aadai Nirmala as Mala
- Pushpa Kumari as Vasantha

== Production ==
Ave Kallu was directed by A. C. Trilokchandar and produced by AVM Productions. Trilokchandar also wrote the story, while D. V. Narasa Raju penned the dialogues. The film was made simultaneously in Telugu and Tamil, with the Tamil version titled Athey Kangal. In the Tamil version, Ravichandran played the role of Krishna, while Nagesh portrayed Padmanabham's role. Kanchana and Geetanjali reprised their roles in both versions. While Padmanabham and Geetanjali had limited roles, their characters primarily contributed to the comedic elements of the film. S. P. Muthuraman, later known for his work on films such as Samsaram Oka Chadarangam (1987), served as an assistant director for this film.

The production of Ave Kallu coincided with that of Bhakta Prahlada (1967). Producer A. V. Meiyappan was confident that Bhakta Prahlada would be a major hit, while his sons—Murugan, Kumaran, and Saravanan—had more confidence in Ave Kallu. As a result, Meiyappan focused his attention on Bhakta Prahlada, while his sons concentrated on Ave Kallu. Ultimately, Bhakta Prahlada became a huge success, while Ave Kallu received a mixed reception, with some considering it an average to flop film.

D. V. Narasa Raju was paid double the usual remuneration. He justified this demand by stating that if the film was a success, he would gain more work opportunities, but if it flopped, he would struggle to find future opportunities. As a result, he negotiated double payment in case of the film's failure.

Ave Kallu was made in Eastmancolor and is notable for being the first Telugu crime film to be entirely made in colour.

== Music ==
The music for Ave Kallu was composed by Vedha. The song "Maa Oollo Oka Paduchundhi" gained popularity and remains well-known.

Track list
No.	Title	Lyrics	Singer(s)	Length
1.	"Chakkani Parku Vundhi"	Kosaraju	L. R. Eswari, Pithapuram Nageswara Rao	3:25
2.	"Chelini Chenthaku Piluchuko"	Dasarathi	L. R. Eswari	4:00
3.	"Dum Dum Dum Gangireddhu"	Kosaraju	P. Suseela	3:43
4.	"Evaru Neevaaro"	Dasarathi	Ghantasala	3:34
5.	"Maa Oollo Oka Paduchundhi"	Kosaraju	Ghantasala, Pithapuram Nageswara Rao	5:26
6.	"Muddhuloluku Chinnadhi"	Dasarathi	Ghantasala, P. Suseela	3:35
7.	"O O Yenthati Andham"	Dasarathi	Ghantasala, P. Suseela	4:53
8.	"O Priyathama"	Dasarathi	P. Suseela	4:42
Total length:				33:18

== Reception ==
Although the film was not a major hit during its initial release, it gained success and earned more revenue in subsequent runs.
