= Main Bhi Ladki Hoon =

- Lobby card
- Directed by: A. C. Tirulokchandar
- Story by: Shailash Dey
- Based on: Naanum Oru Penn (1963)
- Starring: Dharmendra; Meena Kumari
- Music by: Chitragupt
- Release date: 8 October 1964
- Running time: 152 minutes
- Country: India
- Language: Hindi

Main Bhi Ladki Hoon (transl. I too am a girl) is a 1964 Indian Hindi-language drama film. Directed by A. C. Tirulokchandar, the film stars Dharmendra and Meena Kumari. It is a remake of the 1962 Bengali film Bodhu, which was previously remade by Tirulokchandar himself into Tamil as Naanum Oru Penn.

== Plot ==
Rajni, a dusky, uneducated girl, is deceptively married off to Ram, son of a wealthy father. Although loved by all, a conniving relative sows the seeds of suspicion in the minds of the family members.

== Cast ==
- Dharmendra as Ram
- Meena Kumari as Rajni
- Balraj Sahani as Ganga
- Om Prakash as Dindayal "Raja"
- A. V. M. Rajan as Balram
- Pushpalatha as Chanda
- Bhagwan Dada as T. B.
- Manorama as Mrs. Dindayal
- S. V. Ranga Rao as Zamindar
- Mohan Choti as Lallu
- Kammo as Bhagwanti
- Umesh Sharma as Mohan

== Soundtrack ==
The music director of this movie is Chitragupt. The songs "Chanda Se Hoga Woh Pyara" and "Krishna, O Kaale Krishna" have the same tune as the Tamil and the Telugu version.

Song	Singer
"Chanda Se Hoga Woh Pyara"	P. B. Srinivas, Lata Mangeshkar
"Krishna, O Kale Krishna"	Lata Mangeshkar
"Aaye The Huzoor" (Male)	Mohammed Rafi
"Yehi To Din Hai Baharon Ke, Dupatton Ke Nazaron Ke"	Mohammed Rafi, Asha Bhosle
"Aaye The Huzoor" (Female)	Asha Bhosle
