= Babumon (film) =

1975 film directed by Hariharan

- Directed by: Hariharan
- Screenplay by: S. L. Puram Sadanandan
- Story by: Kishore Kumar
- Produced by: G. P. Balan
- Starring: Prem Nazir; Jayabharathi; Srividya; Adoor Bhasi
- Cinematography: T. N. Krishnankutty Nair
- Edited by: V. P. Krishnan
- Music by: M. S. Viswanathan
- Production company: Chanthamani Films
- Release date: 31 October 1975
- Country: India
- Language: Malayalam

Babumon is a 1975 Indian Malayalam-language film, directed by Hariharan and written by G. P. Balan. The film stars Prem Nazir, Jayabharathi, Srividya and Adoor Bhasi. It is a remake of the Hindi film Door Gagan Ki Chhaon Mein.

== Cast ==
- Prem Nazir as Unnikrishnan
- Jayabharathi as Indumathi
- Srividya as Sharada
- Master Raghu as Babumon
- Adoor Bhasi as Balu
- K. P. Ummer
- Thikkurissy Sukumaran Nair
- Jose Prakash as Puli Naanu
- T. S. Muthaiah as Ashaan
- Pattom Sadan
- Sankaradi as Pathiru Menon
- Bahadoor as Panikkar
- Sreelatha Namboothiri as Vasanthi
- Sunil
- Prathapachandran
- Azhikkode Balan
- Benny the dog
- Madamana Subramanyam
- Muthukulam Raghavan Pillai as An Advocate
- Vellur P. Chandrasekharan
- Vinayaraj
- Santo Krishnan

== Soundtrack ==
The music was composed by M. S. Viswanathan. Lyrics for all the songs were penned by Mankombu Gopalakrishnan.

| Song | Singers |
|---|---|
| "Indraneelam Choriyum" | K. J. Yesudas |
| "Naadan Paattinte" | K. J. Yesudas |
| "Padmatheerthakkarayil" | Vani Jairam |
| "Padmatheerthakkarayil" | P. Susheela, Jayachandran |
| "Raksha Daivatham" (Ividamaaneeshwara) | K. J. Yesudas, Jayachandran, Chorus |
| "Valluvannaattile" | P. Susheela |
