= A. C. Thirulokachandar =

Indian film director and screenwriter

- Born: Arcot Chengalvaraya Mudaliyar Thirulokachandar; 11 June 1930; Arcot, Vellore district, Madras presidency, India
- Died: 15 June 2016 (aged 86); Chennai, Tamil Nadu, India
- Education: M. A.
- Occupations: Film director, screenwriter
- Years active: 1952–1988
- Height: 6 ft 3 in (1.91 m)
- Children: 3

Arcot Chengalvaraya Thirulokachandar (11 June 1930 – 15 June 2016) was an Indian film director and screenwriter who worked mainly in Tamil films from the 1950s to 1988. He also directed a few films in Hindi and Telugu. His 1969 Tamil film Deiva Magan was the first South Indian film to be submitted by India in contest for the Academy Award for Best Foreign Language Film.

== Career ==
During the making of the film Kumari in 1952, A.C. Tirulokchandar was working as a junior assistant on the sets and during the shooting of this film became a close friend of M. G. Ramachandran. Producer A. V. Meiyappan noticed his talent and gave A.C. Tirulokchandar his break as the director in 1962 film Veerathirumagan.

With the success of his debut film, he got one more film to direct under AVM Productions which was bilingual made simultaneously as Main Bhi Ladki Hoon in Hindi and as Nannum Oru Penn (1963) in Tamil. The latter won the National Film Award for Best Feature Film in Tamil at 11th National Film Awards and also won Filmfare Award for Best film. With this, he became a permanent fixture as director with AVM. He became like the fifth son of Mr. A. V. Meiyappan and became close friend of A.V.M.Saravanan.

Tirulokchandar directed the fiftieth film produced by AVM banner – Anbe Vaa, a romantic comedy film, in 1966 with M.G. Ramachandran and Saroja Devi in the lead. He directed the films produced by K. Balaji – Thangai (1967), En Thambi (1968), Thirudan (1969) and Engiruntho Vanthaal (1970) which were Tamil remakes of blockbuster films in other languages. He was not only adept at directing social dramas like Babu (1971) with Sivaji Ganesan in the lead, Ramu (1966) with Gemini Ganesan as the hero but also romantic dramas such as Iru Malargal (1967) and Anbalippu (1969) as well as the romantic comedies Anbe Vaa (1966) and Anbe Aaruyire (1975).

He was given the task of directing the first bilingual suspense thriller film from AVM banner in 1967 which was Ave Kallu in Telugu and Adhey Kangal in Tamil. He directed the pair Sivaji Ganesan and Jayalalithaa in five films – Deiva Magan (1969), Dharmam Engey (1972), Engirundho Vandhaal (1970), Enga Mama (1970) and Avanthan Manidhan (1975). He directed Rajesh Khanna in Babu in 1985 which became a hit. His other acclaimed Tamil films include Thirudan, Aval, Dheerga Sumangali, Vasandatil Oru Naal, Bhadrakali, Anbe Aaruyire and Bharata Vilas. He was known to co-ordinate the colour schemes of the actors' outfits with the sets designed for the film.

== Personal life ==
Tirulokchandar had a daughter and two sons, the younger of whom died of cancer in 2016.

== Death ==
Tirulokchandar died on 15 June 2016 at the age of 86. The reason for death was declared as "age-related issues".

== Filmography ==
Year	Film	Language	Notes
1952	Kumari	Tamil	Assistant Direction
1960	Vijayapuri Veeran	Tamil	Story & Dialogue Writer
1962	Paarthaal Pasi Theerum	Tamil	Story & Dialogue Writer
1962	Veerathirumagan	Tamil	
1963	Naanum Oru Penn	Tamil	
1964	Main Bhi Ladki Hoon	Hindi	
1965	Naadi Aada Janme	Telugu	
1965	Kakkum Karangal	Tamil	
1966	Anbe Vaa	Tamil	Inspired by American film Come September
1966	Ramu	Tamil	
1967	Thangai	Tamil	
1967	Athey Kangal	Tamil	
1967	Iru Malargal	Tamil	
1967	Ave Kallu	Telugu	
1968	Ramu	Telugu	Remake of Tamil film of same name
1968	En Thambi	Tamil	
1969	Thirudan	Tamil	Remake of Adrushtavanthulu
1969	Deiva Magan	Tamil	
1969	Anbalippu	Tamil	Story and screenplay credits as well
1970	Engirundho Vandhaal	Tamil	Simultaneously made as Khilona
1970	Enga Mama	Tamil	Remake of Brahmachari
1971	Pavitra Hrudayalu	Telugu	
1971	Babu	Tamil	Remake of Odayil Ninnu; screenplay credits as well
1972	Itho Entha Deivam	Tamil	
1972	Aval	Tamil	
1972	Dharmam Engey	Tamil	
1973	Radha	Tamil	25th Film
1973	Sontham	Tamil	
1973	Bharatha Vilas	Tamil	
1974	Dheerga Sumangali	Tamil	
1975	Dr. Siva	Tamil	
1975	Anbe Aaruyirae	Tamil	
1975	Avanthan Manithan	Tamil	Remake of Kasturi Nivasa
1976	Nee Indri Naanillai	Tamil	
1976	Bhadrakali	Tamil	
1977	Penn Jenmam	Tamil	
1977	Bhadrakali	Telugu	
1978	Pilot Premnath	Tamil	
1978	Vanakkatukuriya Kathaliye	Tamil	
1980	Vishwaroopam	Tamil	
1980	Kadhal Kiligal	Tamil	Remake of Ghar
1981	Lorry Driver Rajakannu	Tamil	
1982	Teri Kasam	Hindi	
1982	Baawri	Hindi	
1982	Vasandhathil Or Naal	Tamil	Remake of Mausam
1985	Babu	Hindi	
1985	Do Dilon Ki Dastaan	Hindi	
1987	Kudumbam Oru Koyil	Tamil	
1987	Anbulla Appa	Tamil	
1988	Shukriyaa	Hindi	
