= K. C. N. Gowda =

Kannada film executive and producer (c. 1928–2012)

K. C. Nanjunde Gowda
- Born: Konenahalli Chowdaiah Nanjunde Gowda c. 1928; Konenahalli, Doddaballapura, Karnataka
- Died: 4 October 2012 (aged 84); Bangalore, Karnataka
- Occupations: producer, distributor

Konenahalli Chowdaiah Nanjunde Gowda (c. 1928 – 4 October 2012) was an Indian businessman, film producer, exhibitor, financier, and distributor associated with the Kannada film industry. During a career spanning several decades, he produced a number of notable Kannada films, including Sharapanjara, Huliya Halina Mevu, Babruvahana, Bangarada Panjara, Daari Thappida Maga. His contributions played a significant role in the development and growth of Kannada cinema.

He distributed more than 300 films and won several awards, notably the Dr. Rajkumar award from Karnataka state government.

== Biography ==
He was born to Chowdaiah and Muddamma as the eldest of six children at Konenahalli village of Doddaballapura, Karnataka. With no interest in education, he ventured into the Sericulture business in stages, with successful results. He then ventured into construction of film theatres – Navrang theatre in Bangalore, Rajkamal Theatre in Doddaballapur and Urvashi Theatre, Bangalore. During this time, he started the KCN Movies banner to distribute the Kannada films; Belli Moda, directed by S. R. Puttanna Kanagal was his first Kannada film as a distributor. He later went on to distribute more than 300 films. For the progress of KCN Gowda in business, his brothers were the backbone along with his two sons – K. C. N. Chandrashekar and K. C. N. Mohan, who are also film producers. He is a veteran Producer–Director, making memorable Kannada films, including blockbuster Bangarada Manushya, starring Dr. Rajkumar.

Under the leadership of K. C. N. Gowda, the production house emphasized films that combined entertainment with themes considered socially and culturally significant. He sought to enhance the production values of Kannada cinema by incorporating technical and aesthetic standards comparable to those of other Indian film industries. During a period when the Kannada film industry faced infrastructural limitations and shortages of resources, including raw stock for colour film production, Gowda played a role in facilitating the import of film stock from overseas sources. His efforts contributed to the adoption of improved production practices and the advancement of technical standards in Kannada filmmaking.

One of Gowda's early notable productions was Bangarada Manushya, directed by Siddalingaiah and starring Dr. Rajkumar. The film was a major commercial and critical success and is regarded as an influential work in Kannada cinema. Another significant production associated with Gowda was Sharapanjara, directed by S. R. Puttanna Kanagal and starring Kalpana. The film is considered an important work in both Gowda's career and the history of Kannada cinema.

He produced his first Kannada film Bhale Jodi starring Rajkumar in a double role under Rajkamal Arts in the early 1970s. For this film, he launched a unique publicity strategy never employed by anyone before in Karnataka – he erected an 80-foot cutout of Rajkumar at the time of the release of this film with prior state government permission – his maiden film was a huge hit inspiring him to produce more than fifty popular movies in the following years. The mega success of the maiden film and the support he got from Kannada film viewers inspired him to go in for popular subjects for the Kannada screen. Bangarada Manushya ran for two years in States Theatre Bangalore, while Sharapanjara was a silver jubilee film. It was the right fruit for his discipline and devotion in work. The K.C.N. Brothers ventured into different subjects in movies, including social, mythological, historical and entertaining films. He introduced many new talents to Kannada cinema in the field of artistes and technicians. There was no shortfall in the hospitality in the production house of the KCN Gowda banner. Dr. Rajkumar was appreciating Gowda as "Anna Dhaata", affectionately.

The K.C.N. Gowda family crossed 50 years in filmdom, the production house of Karnataka. It has made the South Indian film industry in Tamil, Telugu and Malayalam to turn back and take a look at the work it has done. The California-based Gold Stone Company was contacted by Gowda in giving a facelift of color to the black and white Satya Harischandra of K.C.N. Gowda.

In his later years, Gowda oversaw the restoration and re-release of several films he had originally produced in black and white. These reissues incorporated colourisation, widescreen presentation, digital sound technologies such as DTS, and, in some cases, 3D conversion. Among the films restored under his initiative were Satya Harishchandra, Kasturi Nivasa, Kaviratna Kalidasa, Babruvahana, and Veera Kesari, all starring Dr. Rajkumar.

Gowda's most notable restoration project was Satya Harishchandra (1965), which he had originally produced with a budget of approximately ₹550,000. Gowda collaborated with the California-based Gold Stone Technologies to colourise and digitally enhance the film. The film was re-released in 2008, reportedly at a cost of around ₹35 million. Gowda stated that the restoration was undertaken as a tribute to Dr. Rajkumar, whom he greatly admired.

K.C.N. Gowda died at the age of 84.

== Filmography ==
- Nammura Raja
- Babruvahana
- Bangarada Panjara
- Jayasimha
- Huli Halina Mevu
- Kasturi Nivasa
- Bhakta Siriyala
- Ranga Nayaki
- Bangaarada Manushya
- Sanadhi Appanna
- Antima Teerpu
- Dhari Thappida Maga
- Namma Samsara
- Thayi Devaru
- Doorada Betta
- Satya Harishchandra
- Belli Moda

== Awards ==
- Phalke Academy award in 2005
- Dr. Rajkumar award
- Karnataka Film Directors Association award

== Death ==
KCN Gowda died following a brief illness on 4 October 2012 at the age of 84.
