= Kasturi Nivasa =

1971 film by Dorai–Bhagavan

- DVD cover
- Directed by: Dorai–Bhagavan
- Screenplay by: Dorai–Bhagavan
- Story by: G. Balasubramanium
- Produced by: K. C. N. Gowda
- Starring: Rajkumar; K. S. Ashwath; Jayanthi; Aarathi; Baby Rani
- Cinematography: B. Dorairaj; Chettibabu; N. G. Rao
- Edited by: Venkataram; Kalyan
- Music by: G. K. Venkatesh
- Production company: Anupam Movies
- Release date: 29 January 1971
- Running time: 152 minutes
- Country: India
- Language: Kannada
- Budget: ₹3.75 lakh

Kasturi Nivasa ( transl. House of Fragrance) is a 1971 Indian Kannada-language drama film written and directed by the director duo Dorai–Bhagavan based on a story by G. Balasubramanium which was loosely inspired by William Shakespeare's play Timon of Athens. It was produced by K. C. N. Gowda under the banner of Anupam Movies. The film stars Rajkumar as Ravi Varma, an extremely generous man, who succumbs to his intention of being generous no matter what happens. It features Jayanthi, Raja Shankar, K. S. Ashwath and Aarathi in key roles.

After Balasubramaniam wrote the story exclusively for Sivaji Ganesan, director K. Shankar and producer Noor were impressed. Sivaji Ganesan however declined to use the story, citing its tragic ending. In early 1971, Chi. Udayashankar and S. P. Varadaraj chanced upon the project. Eventually, they persuaded Dorai–Bhagavan to listen to the story. Upon hearing the story, they agreed to make the film, with Rajkumar in the lead role. They bought the rights for the film for ₹38,000. The film was financed by K. C. N. Gowda. It features original songs composed by G. K. Venkatesh, while the filming was done by B. Dorairaj, Chettibabu and N. G. Rao.

Expectations for Kasturi Nivasa were low. Upon its release on 29 January 1971, initial response was tepid, but favorable word-of-mouth publicity and positive critical response helped it to become a box office success, with a theatrical run of 100 days in 16 theatres across Karnataka. The film was remade in Hindi as Shaandaar (1974), and in Tamil as Avandhan Manidhan (1975). The film's soundtrack was well received with the songs Aadisidaata and Aadisi Nodu Beelisi Nodu becoming chartbusters.

In 2014, Kasturi Nivasa became the second Kannada film to be digitally remastered and colourised, at an estimated cost of ₹2 crore. The project of colorising the film was taken up by K. C. N. Gowda himself. However, he died midway through the project. After he died, his son, K. C. N. Mohan took over the project. The updated version was released on 7 November 2014 in over 100 theatres in Karnataka. It was a commercial success that generated mostly positive reviews.

== Plot ==
Ravi Varma, owner of a matchbox factory, is a widower and has lost his daughter in an accident. Recognising that his honest employee Chandru is in a similar position, he decides to help Chandru financially. As Chandru attends training in the US, Ravi takes care of Chandru's charming daughter. On return, Chandru suggests changing the company's structure. Ravi, who is a traditionalist becomes infuriated. Protesting this, Chandru resigns and starts his own matchbox company and becomes the leading matchbox manufacturer. Ravi has planned to propose to his secretary Neela, but when she seeks his permission to marry Chandru, he blesses her.

Facing financial losses because of excessive charity, Ravi puts up his house for sale. Chandru calls for the highest bid to give it back to Ravi, but Ravi does not accept. Circumstances lead to Ravi's downfall. The film ends on a tragic note. Neela requests him to give her the dove for her sick daughter. But Ravi has just sold the dove, to prepare a meal for Neela. Unable to say no to a request, he breathes his last.

== Cast ==
- Rajkumar as Ravi Varma
- Jayanthi as Neela
- Aarathi as Lakshmi
- Raja Shankar as Chandru
- Baby Rani as Rani
- K. S. Ashwath as Ramaiah
- Narasimharaju as Sampath
- Balakrishna as Bhojarajaiah
- Vijayashree
- Surekha
- Halam

== Production ==
=== Development ===
The story Kasturi Nivasam written by G. Balasubramanium had been bought by film producer Noor for ₹ 25,000 wanting to make a film in Tamil with Sivaji Ganesan However, Ganesan was reluctant after hearing the story, considering that the film had a tragic ending with the protagonist dying. In early 1971, Kannada screenwriter Chi. Udayashankar and Rajkumar’s younger brother S. P. Varadaraj chanced upon the project. Eventually, they coaxed Dorai–Bhagavan (B. Dorai Raj and S.K. Bhagavan) to listen to the story. Upon hearing the story, Dorai–Bhagavan, were interested in making the film with Rajkumar under their banner Anupam Movies.

=== Casting and filming ===
The director duo was not sure if Rajkumar would accept the role. Rajkumar was then convinced by his brother Varadappa, following which the rights were bought from Noor by Dorai–Bhagavan for ₹38,000. Rajkumar received a remuneration of ₹15,000.

Filming done in Mysore and Kanteerava Studios in Bangalore, was completed in 19 and a half days, having spent ₹3.75 lakh. The dove used in the film was bought for ₹500 from outside the erstwhile Mysore State. When filming began in 1971, Kasturi Nivasa was initially to have been shot in colour. On the second day of filming, the producer K. C. N. Gowda asked the team to stop filming on its second day and was adamant about filming it in colour, in spite of having a black-and-white set of ₹1.25 lakh. He felt the film must be shot in Eastmancolor, and said he was ready to incur an additional expenditure of ₹5.5 lakh. But Rajkumar felt it should go on as conceived. Finally, Rajkumar on insisting Gowda that money not be wasted, the filming resumed in black-and-white.

== Soundtrack ==
The music was composed by G. K. Venkatesh. The album consists of six tracks. The songs "Aadisidaata" and "Aadisi Nodu Beelisi Nodu" were written by Chi. Udayashankar, who also wrote the film's screenplay. On the final day of the re-recording, while scoring the background music for the climax, L. Vaidyanathan, assistant to Venkatesh, felt free verse would enhance the mood and add additional depth to the situation. Immediately, Udayashankar was called and made to listen to the tune on violin, he then wrote the lyrics for song "Aadisidaata" which Venkatesh himself sang. The song "Nee Bandu Nintaaga" was loosely inspired by "Yeh Dil Diwana Hai" from the 1970 Hindi film Ishq Par Zor Nahin. The song "Aadisi Nodu Beelisi Nodu" also featured as a background song in the opening scene of the 2025 Malayalam-language film Officer on Duty.

Title	Lyrics	Singers	Length
"Nee Bandu Nintaga"	R. N. Jayagopal	P. B. Sreenivas P. Susheela	4:17
"Aadisi Nodu Beelisi Nodu"	Chi. Udayashankar	P. B. Sreenivas	3:19
"Aadona Neenu Naanu"	Vijaya Narasimha	P. B. Sreenivas	3:41
"Elle Iru Hege Iru"	Chi. Udaya Shankar	P. Susheela	3:26
"Aadisidaata Besara Moodi"	Chi. Udaya Shankar	G. K. Venkatesh	3:21
"Oh Geleya" (Cabaret song)	R. N. Jayagopal	L. R. Eswari	3:19

== Themes ==
The film stresses the principle that "life is to give—not to take". The role of Ravi Varma, the protagonist played by Rajkumar is a character who upholds the values of life even it means his destruction; a person who is keen on retaining his character's purity and those morals he has cherished. Ravi Varma led a lonely yet righteous life. He did not break his principles even as it led to his downfall.

== Reception ==
=== Critical response ===
Hita Prakash of Deccan Herald praised the film for portraying the nuances of leading a righteous yet lonely life. It was also praised for chartering the rise of new order – the relevance of modern manufacturing techniques and the loss of class divide with an associated loss of morals. Sivaji Ganesan was all praise for Rajkumar's performance in the film.

=== Box office ===
The film got an average response in its initial run of nine weeks. However, it picked up soon and went on to complete 175 days at several centres across Karnataka with a 100-day run at 16 centres in Mysore. Learning of the film's success, Sivaji Ganesan purchased the remake rights for ₹2 lakh. The Tamil version of Kasturi Nivasa, directed by A. C. Tirulokchandar, was Avandhan Manidhan (1975).

== Colourisation ==
A comparison between the original (above) and colourised versions

Kasturi Nivasa was Rajkumar's second film to be colourised and then theatrically released, after Satya Harishchandra (1965), a colourised version of which was released in 2008. The project to colourise Kasturi Nivasa was taken up by its producer K. C. N. Gowda. With parts of the film's negatives damaged, the first step in colourisation involved procuring the archival print from the Karnataka film archives. Bits of the negatives were then procured from other sources and spliced together to restore the original quality of the film (in black-and-white). The colourisation work was carried out by 60 personnel for a period of 20 months, who coloured each of the 215,000 frames of the original film. The music of the film was also recreated. The audio of the film stored digitally was converted to 5.1 surround sound.

With the work 70 per cent completed, Gowda died in October 2012. Following his death, his son K. C. N. Mohan took over the project. Speaking of colourising the dresses in film's frames, he said, "We had to take into consideration the costumes of the 1970s. We used a software which gave us the nearest-matching colour." The black-and-white film was first saved in digital format before removing the scratches, dots and rainy lines from it. Based on the grey scales, colours were then added using a digital enhancement technique for the first time for an Indian film. The colourised film has a frame rate of 24 per second. The project was completed at a cost of ₹2 crore (US$210,000).

The colourised film released on 7 November 2014, in over 100 prints in Karnataka. Upon the theatrical re-release, the film opened to a good response from the audience. It opened to packed audiences in the initial weeks of its release, performing well in both single screens and multiplexes. Competing against other films that released during the time of its release, the film performed well and trade analysts speculated a ₹2 crore revenue in its first week of re-release. Film critic Shyam Prasad S. of Bangalore Mirror remarked that the coloured version "retains the charm of the old world films." He further added that "the colouring was not a restoration work. It has made the classic even better. It highlights minute details like the torn wool and discoloring of the torn part of the tattered suit in the latter half of the movie." Following a good response at the domestic box-office reports, in late November 2014 the film was screened in six cities in the United States.

== Legacy ==
The film is considered to be a milestone in Kannada cinema. The role of Ravi Varma, the protagonist played by Rajkumar is a character who upholds the values of life even it means his destruction; a person who is keen on retaining his character's purity and those morals he has cherished. The character became an inspiration for the protagonist, Siddhartha of the 2017 film Raajakumara which starred Rajkumar's son Puneeth. "Every character played by Dr Rajkumar... Some roles like that of Rajeeva's character in Bangarada Manushya and the one in Kasturi Nivasa, have attained greatness due to this. They are considered to be the topmost films in Dr Rajkumar's career. This is also one of the reasons why the recently released film Raajakumara featuring Puneeth Rajkumar, has great similarities of those selfless acts of Annavru in Kasturi Nivasa and this instantly connected with the audience", said film historian Srinivas. The film was also noted for featuring the dove which has over the years attained a cult status and is noted for its special connection with the Rajkumar Family. Puneeth Rajkumar can also be seen with a dove in Raajkumara. Shivarajkumar, Rajkumar's eldest son was also seen with a dove in the 2022 film Bairagee.
