= Ramu (1966 film) =

1966 film by A. C. Tirulokchandar

- Theatrical release poster
- Directed by: A. C. Thirulokachandar
- Screenplay by: Javar N. Seetharaman
- Story by: Kishore Kumar
- Produced by: M. Murugan; M. Kumaran; M. Saravanan
- Starring: Gemini Ganesh; K. R. Vijaya
- Cinematography: T. Muthusamy; D. Rajagopal
- Edited by: R. G. Gopu
- Music by: M. S. Viswanathan
- Production company: Uma Productions
- Release date: 10 June 1966
- Running time: 149 minutes
- Country: India
- Language: Tamil

Ramu is a 1966 Indian Tamil-language drama film directed by A. C. Thirulokachandar and written by Javar N. Seetharaman. The film stars Gemini Ganesh and K. R. Vijaya, with Ashokan, Nagesh, V. K. Ramasamy, O. A. K. Thevar and Master Rajkumar—as the title character—in supporting roles. A remake of the Hindi film Door Gagan Ki Chhaon Mein (1964), it revolves around a boy who loses his speech after witnessing his mother's death, and his father attempts to restore his son's speech.

Ramu was produced by Uma Productions, a subsidiary of AVM Productions, and predominantly shot in the village of Kaduvetti, Tamil Nadu. It was released on 10 June 1966 and became a commercial success, winning the National Film Award for Best Tamil Feature Film. The film was remade in Telugu with the same title in 1968 by the same studio and director, with Rajkumar reprising his role.

== Plot ==
Raja, an Indian Army soldier, lives peacefully with his wife Seetha and their son Ramu until he is called back to duty. During the war, his commanding officer dies in Raja's arms after mentioning his unmarried daughter. While Raja is away, dacoits attack his village, burn his home, and kill Seetha. Traumatized by witnessing his mother’s death, Ramu loses his speech. Raja returns, learns the truth, and leaves the village with Ramu to seek treatment.

Raja and Ramu arrive in another village where Seethalakshmi (Lakshmi) lives alone after her father’s death. Her greedy uncle Ganganna wants her to marry his corrupt son Rangan, but she refuses. After Rangan slaps Ramu, Raja fights him and is injured; Lakshmi nurses him back to health. Raja helps Lakshmi with her farm, and she grows fond of him. She bonds with Ramu as well, though Raja remains emotionally distant, still mourning his wife. Raja later saves Lakshmi from Rangan and discovers she is the daughter of his fallen superior.

Meanwhile, Ramu befriends a former Tamil teacher. Ganganna and Rangan hire the dacoit Sangili to kill Raja, but Raja defeats him twice, and Sangili is arrested. Doctors in Madras fail to cure Ramu’s muteness, and Raja, overwhelmed, attempts suicide with his son. After hearing a devotional song about Krishna they stop, and they return to Lakshmi’s village, where she insists they stay.

Rangan later steals crops from Lakshmi’s land and frames Raja, who is arrested. Ramu's dog is tied in one of Rangan's houses because it witnessed Rangan's crime. Ramu enters the house to free it but is also tied up. The teacher, searching for Ramu, confronts Ganganna, who earlier cheated the teacher's daughter, leading her to drown herself in a well. The teacher intimidates Ganganna, who falls into the same well and dies. When Rangan tries to assault Lakshmi, the dog escapes and alerts Raja. Raja fights Rangan as a fire breaks out. Lakshmi faints, and at the critical moment, Ramu regains his speech, calling out to her and helping save her. Rangan is arrested, and the teacher confesses to causing Ganganna’s death.

Raja prepares to leave the village, but Ramu refuses to part from Lakshmi. Realising their bond, Raja agrees to marry her and remain in the village.

== Cast ==
- Gemini Ganesh as Raja
- K. R. Vijaya as Seethalakshmi "Lakshmi"
- Ashokan as Rangan
- Nagesh as Muthu
- V. K. Ramasamy as Ganganna
- O. A. K. Thevar as Sangili
- V. S. Raghavan as a doctor
- Master Rajkumar as Ramu
- V. Nagayya (special appearance in the song "Kannan Vandhan")
- S. V. Subbaiah as the Tamil teacher
- Ramadas as Lakshmi's father
- C. S. Pushpalatha as Seetha
- S. N. Lakshmi as Kannamma

== Production ==
=== Development ===
While in Bombay for the production of the film Do Kaliyan (1968), M. Saravanan of AVM Productions chanced upon a film banner featuring Kishore Kumar and a boy. Saravanan learned the Hindi film was Door Gagan Ki Chhaon Mein (1964), and Chinna Menon, the manager of AVM's Bombay branch, told him it was unsuccessful but he was convinced the story was different. After enquiring further about the story, he learned it was about a mute boy. Saravanan asked Menon for a print of Door Gagan Ki Chhaon Mein to watch but Menon did not take the request seriously. Subramaniam of Venus Pictures had bought the rights to remake the film in Tamil for ₹10,000 (equivalent to ₹600,000 or US$6,300 in 2023) but later sold the rights to Saravanan for the same amount plus ₹5,000 (equivalent to ₹300,000 or US$3,100 in 2023).

Saravanan screened Door Gagan Ki Chhaon Mein for his father A. V. Meiyappan; brothers Murugan and Kumaran; directors Krishnan–Panju; screenwriter Javar N. Seetharaman and director A. C. Thirulokachandar. Krishnan–Panju detested the film and Seetharaman believed a film featuring a child in a prominent role could only succeed if the child had powerful dialogue, evidenced by the success of AVM's Kalathur Kannamma (1960), whereas the boy in Door Gagan Ki Chhaon Mein is mute. Saravanan suggested writing the cause of the boy's muteness, an idea Seetharaman accepted and began writing the screenplay. Thirulokachandar was finalised as director, and paid ₹40,000 (equivalent to ₹2.4 million or US$25,000 in 2023). After the title Ramu was finalised, Saravanan's friends had misgivings but he refused to change the title. The film was produced by Murugan, Kumaran and Saravanan under Uma Productions, a subsidiary of AVM. Cinematography was assigned to T. Muthusamy and D. Rajagopal, and art direction to A. K. Sekhar.

=== Casting and filming ===
After Kalathur Kannamma, AVM had not approached Gemini Ganesh for any film. When Ganesh met AVM and asked why, AVM said they could not afford to meet Ganesh's financial demands, which was substantially higher than the ₹10,000–₹20,000 they were paying other actors. Ganesh said he would be willing to act for any amount. Though Murugan, Kumaran and Saravanan planned to cast Jaishankar, who they felt was the right person to subdue the dacoits onscreen, Meiyappan felt Ganesh could better convey the character's grief for his wife's death and his son's loss of speech; they agreed with their father's choice of Ganesh. K. R. Vijaya was cast after the producers were impressed with her performance in Karpagam (1963). Yogendrakumar, later known as Master Rajkumar, was chosen to play the title character from over 100 children who screen-tested. This was his first Tamil film; he had previously appeared in several Kannada, Telugu and Malayalam films. Meiyappan felt the name Yogendrakumar was not appealing to Tamil audiences and gave him his new name.

Ramu was mostly filmed in the village of Kaduvetti, Tamil Nadu. The climax scene, depicting Ramu and Seethalakshmi in a burning room, was filmed over five days; kerosene was used to light the fire. When the fire was weakening, more kerosene was added, leading to increased fire. Vijaya was quickly helped out but Rajkumar was tied up so Thirulokachandar ran in and saved him. After R. G. Gope edited the film, the final length was 4,272 metres (14,016 ft), amounting to 149 minutes.

=== Soundtrack ===
The music composed by M. S. Viswanathan. The lyrics of all songs were penned by Kannadasan. The song "Nilave Ennidam" is set in the Hindustani raga Bageshri, and "Kannan Vandhan" is set to Yaman. During the recording of this song, the original singer was unable to match the "weighty" singing of co-performer Sirkazhi Govindarajan, so he was replaced with T. M. Soundararajan.

Track listing
| No. | Title | Singer(s) | Length |
|---|---|---|---|
| 1. | "Kannan Vandhan" | T. M. Soundararajan, Sirkazhi Govindarajan | 5:33 |
| 2. | "Muthu Chippi" | P. Susheela | 4:13 |
| 3. | "Nilave Ennidam" | P. B. Sreenivas, P. Susheela | 4:40 |
| 4. | "Pachai Maram Ondru" (duet) | P. Susheela, P. B. Sreenivas | 2:56 |
| 5. | "Pachai Maram Ondru" (solo) | P. Susheela | 3:40 |
| Total length: | | | 21:02 |

== Release and reception ==
Ramu was released on 10 June 1966. The film was a commercial success, running for over 100 days in theatres, and won the National Film Award for Best Tamil Feature Film. Kalki appreciated Thirulokachandar's direction, Seetharaman's writing, and called Ramu a pleasing family film. Kumar, after watching the film, said it made him realise how weakly he had written the original film, and appreciated Seetharaman for making a superior product. His brother Ashok appreciated Seetharaman for making "suitable changes" that made the Tamil film more successful.

== Legacy ==
After the success of Ramu, Ganesh became a much sought after actor and was signed on for eight more films. It was remade in Telugu under the same title in 1968 by the same studio and director, with Rajkumar reprising his role. K. Bhagyaraj said the inspiration for the story of his film Mundhanai Mudichu (1983) was a poster of Ramu, which he had seen as a child. The poster of Ramu featured the protagonist with his motherless son. Bhagyaraj wondered how it would be if he were in that position and prepared the story of Mundhanai Mudichu. Unlike Ramu, the protagonist's son was changed from a preteen to an infant.
