= Dharmam Engey =

- Poster
- Directed by: A. C. Tirulokchandar
- Screenplay by: Sakthi T. K. Krishnasamy
- Story by: A. C. Tirulokchandar
- Produced by: Periyanna
- Starring: Sivaji Ganesan; Jayalalithaa
- Cinematography: Thambu
- Edited by: B. Kanthasamy
- Music by: M. S. Viswanathan
- Production company: Shanthi Films
- Release date: 15 July 1972
- Running time: 151 minutes
- Country: India
- Language: Tamil

Dharmam Engey (transl. Where is dharma?) is a 1972 Indian Tamil-language action film directed by A. C. Tirulokchandar. The film stars Sivaji Ganesan and Jayalalithaa, with M. N. Nambiar, Muthuraman, Nagesh, S. V. Ramadas and Kumari Padmini in supporting roles. It was released on 15 July 1972, and failed at the box office.

== Plot ==
Rajasekaran works in the fields in a village, picking and selling flowers. Maarthaandan is the tyrant ruler who exploits the villagers. Rajasekaran becomes their leader, rebels against Maarthaandan and ultimately succeeds.

== Cast ==
- Sivaji Ganesan as Rajasekaran
- Jayalalithaa as Roopa
- Muthuraman as Boopathy
- Kumari Padmini as Vani
- M. N. Nambiar as Marthandan
- S. V. Ramadas as Captain
- Nagesh as Kurka
- Senthamarai as Captain
- T. V. Kumuthini as Sivakami
- Gemini Balu as Soldier
- Aalam as Dancer

== Production ==
The film was shot at Thiruchopuram in Cuddalore, and AVM Studios in Madras. Sivaji Ganesan appeared in several costumes throughout the film, as did Jayalalithaa, who designed her own costumes. Like a previous Ganesan film, Sivandha Mann (1969), it revolved around the protagonist rebelling against a tyrant ruler. The film was colourised via Eastmancolor.

== Soundtrack ==
The music was composed by M. S. Viswanathan, with lyrics by Kannadasan. An assistant director suggested the director not to use the lyric "Thangai" (transl. younger sister) for a song in Avandhan Manidhan (1975) since "Thangaiyila Illai" (transl. not in the younger sister) was the pallavi for a song in this film. The song "Palli Araikkul Vantha" attained popularity.

Song	Singers
"Suthanthira Bhoomiyile"	T. M. Soundararajan
"Dharmam Engey"	Sirkazhi Govindarajan, P. Susheela
"Veeram Ennum Paavai"	T. M. Soundararajan, L. R. Eswari
"Naangu Kaalamum"	L. R. Eswari, S. Janaki
"Palli Araikkul Vantha"	T. M. Soundararajan, P. Susheela

== Release and reception ==
Dharmam Engey was released on 15 July 1972, delayed from April. The film was an unexpected failure. The film did not run for more than two days, and as a result, it was not successful commercially. The reason for the film's failure, according to historian Randor Guy, was that critics and filmgoers felt it would have better suited M. G. Ramachandran, who was known for such films. This was the only film of Ganesan that released that year that was a failure. Despite the film's failure, in 2022, Laxmi Karthi of Cinemapettai said it still remains one of Ganesan's memorable films.
