= Anbe Aaruyire (1975 film) =

1975 film

- Poster
- Directed by: A. C. Tirulokchandar
- Written by: A. L. Narayanan (dialogues)
- Screenplay by: A. C. Tirulokchandar
- Story by: D. V. Narasa Raju
- Produced by: R. Venkatraman
- Starring: Sivaji Ganesan; Manjula
- Cinematography: M. Viswanatha Rai
- Edited by: B. Kanthasamy
- Music by: M. S. Viswanathan
- Production company: Amutham Productions
- Release date: 26 September 1975
- Running time: 133 minutes
- Country: India
- Language: Tamil

Anbe Aaruyire (transl. Darling) is a 1975 Indian Tamil-language romantic comedy film, directed by A. C. Tirulokchandar. The film stars Sivaji Ganesan and Manjula. It was released on 26 September 1975. The film is a remake of the 1967 Telugu film Gruhalakshmi.

== Plot ==
R. Sattanathan, a leading criminal lawyer and Bangalore Ramaswamy, his professional competitor, were friends in the past but now at odds with each other. Sattanathan has vowed that he will win a case against Ramaswamy at least once in his lifetime, for which he even makes his son Saravanan study law, so that if not him at least his son will defeat Ramaswamy. But contrary to Sattanathan's expectation, Saravanan falls in love with Ramaswamy's daughter Devi. Helping them in their love is Ramesh, Ramaswamy's nephew. Many humourous incidents occur before the lovers are united.

== Cast ==
- Sivaji Ganesan as Saravanan
- Manjula as Sridevi (alias) Devi
- Major Sundarrajan as Advocate Sattanathan
- V. K. Ramasamy as Advocate Bangalore Ramasamy
- Sukumari as Janaki
- Gandhimathi as Meenakshi
- K. A. Thangavelu as Hotel Manager
- Nagesh as Ramesh
- Suruli Rajan as Suruli
- Manorama as Alamel
- Pushpamala as Drama Stage Actress
- Vennira Aadai Moorthy as Saibhu (Guest role)
- Y. G. Mahendra as Lawrence (Guest role)
- T. S. B. K. Moulee as Alamel's husband (Guest role)
- S. Rama Rao as Sattanathan's Assistant
- Padmini as Appi, Alamel's daughter
- Dasarathan as Pandu, Hotel room boy
- Chandran Babu as Taxi driver

== Production ==
The film was launched at Vijaya Studios. B. Nagireddy switched on the camera while Sandow M. M. A. Chinnappa Thevar clapped the board.

== Soundtrack ==
The music was composed by M. S. Viswanathan, with lyrics by Vaali. The song "Malligai Mullai" is set in Tilang raga.

Song	Singers	Length
"Malligai Mullai Poopanthal"	Vani Jairam	03:04
"Osai Varamal"	T. M. Soundararajan, P. Susheela	03:59
"Pattanathu Mappillaikku"	T. M. Soundararajan, L. R. Eswari	04:32
"Raajaveethi Bhavani Vanthathu"	T. M. Soundararajan, P. Susheela, Saibaba, L. R. Anjali	05:54
"Kamadhenuvum Somabanamum"	T. M. Soundararajan, P. Susheela	

== Reception ==
A critic from Film World wrote, "Anbe Aaruyirey could have been a fine comedy if Sivaji didn't work in it and the script had avoided vulgar scenes. It was quite painful to watch Sivaji making faces and behaving like Rishi Kapoor. For most part the camera concentrated on Manjula's inadequate bosom and her navel". Kanthan of Kalki said Tirulokchandar did not utilise his direction and writing well.
