= Sa. Ra. Govindu =

Indian film producer

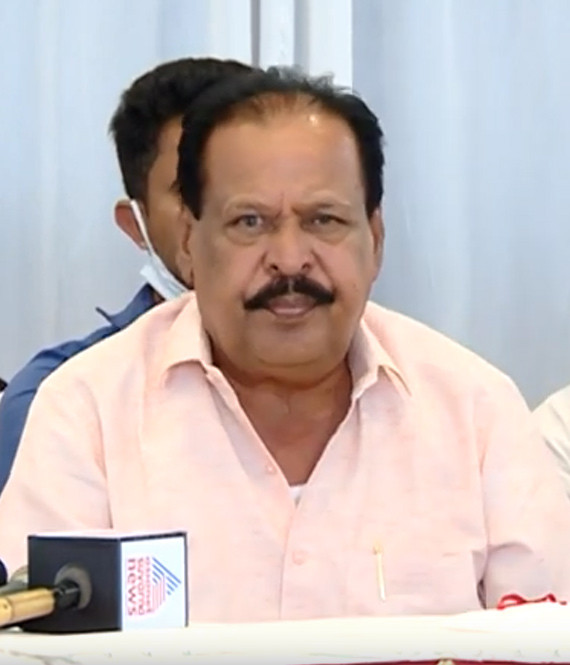
- Sa. Ra. Govindu in a Karnataka Film Chamber of Commerce meeting, in 2020
- Born: Karnataka, India
- Occupation: Film producer

Sa. Ra. Govindu is an Indian film producer in Kannada film industry. He was the president of Karnataka Film Chamber of Commerce (KFCC), till May 2022.

In the 1980s, Govindu had involved himself in Gokak agitation as a Kannada activist.

He has three children; two daughters and one son named Anoop Govindu, who starred in Alemaari Santhu's Kannada film, Dove. Their mother died when Anup was one and a half years old, and so his sisters took care of him. Sa Ra Govindu started his career as a production manager for Dr. Rajakumar films like Naa Ninna Bidalaare (1979), Keralida Simha (1981), Bhagyavantha (1981), Anupama (1981), Kamana Billu (1983), Bhaktha Prahlada (1983), and Dhruva Thare (1985).

Later, he became an activist and President of Dr. Rajakumar Abhimanigala Sangha. In 1987, he had produced the critically acclaimed Kannada film, Elu Suttina Kote and has produced over 18 films under his banner, Tanu Chitra. Other films that he produced include Belli Kalungura (1992), Bombat Huduga (1993), Ranganna (1997), Bhanda Alla Bahaddur (1997), Veerana (1998), Jaidev (1998), Chora Chittha Chora (1999), Kanasugara (2001), Mutthu (2002), Laali Haadu (2003), Bhagavan (2004), and Gunna (2005). He has also been a presenter for several films. He has been the State President of Dr. Rajkumar's Fans Association.

He entered the filmdom as an actor through the 1984 Kannada suspense thriller film, Yaarivanu, where he played a small role. His feature debut film was through Oscar Films’ Dadru Saar Dadru, alongside film director, Om Prakash Rao. However, the film has been canned for a long time. He was next seen in M.S. Rajasekhar's Nanna Hendthi Maduve. Later, he acted in Care of Footpath (2006) and Anand GK's romantic action entertainer film, Titlu Beka.

In 2015, he was elected as the President of KFCC (Karnataka Film Chamber of Commerce). Recently, he supported the bandh in protest to Mahadayi Water Dispute Tribunal's order against the release of TMC water to Karnataka. Sa Ra Govindu expressed his support and declared closures of all multiplexes and theatres and cancelled all shooting schedules.

== Filmography ==
=== Producer ===
- Elu Suttina Kote (1988)
- Belli Kalungura (1992)
- Bombat Huduga (1993)
- Jaana (1994)
- Ranganna (1997)
- Bhanda Alla Bahadur (1997)
- Veeranna (1998)
- Jaidev (1998)
- Chora Chittha Chora (1999)
- Kanasugara (2001)
- Mutthu (2002)
- Chandu (2002)
- Laali Haadu (2003)
- Bhagawan (2004)
- Gunna (2005)
- Minchina Ota (2008)

=== Actor ===
- Nan Hendthi Maduve (2003)

== See also ==
- List of people from Karnataka
- Cinema of Karnataka
- List of film producers
- Cinema of India
