= Avandhan Manidhan =

1975 film by A. C. Tirulokchandar

- Theatrical release poster
- Directed by: A. C. Tirulokchandar
- Screenplay by: A. C. Tirulokchandar
- Story by: G. Balasubramaniam
- Produced by: A. Ramanujam; K. N. Subramanian
- Starring: Sivaji Ganesan; Muthuraman; Jayalalithaa; Manjula
- Cinematography: M. Viswanatha Rai
- Edited by: B. Kanthasamy
- Music by: M. S. Viswanathan
- Production company: Rasi Enterprises
- Distributed by: Sivaji Productions
- Release date: 11 April 1975
- Running time: 170 minutes
- Country: India
- Language: Tamil

Avandhan Manidhan (transl. He is a true man) is a 1975 Indian Tamil-language drama film, directed and co-written by A. C. Tirulokchandar from a story by G. Balasubramaniam. The film stars Sivaji Ganesan, Muthuraman, Jayalalithaa and Manjula. It revolves around an extremely generous man who refuses to budge from his nature, even as it leads to his downfall. It is remake of the superhit Kannada movie Kasturi Nivasa starring Dr. Rajkumar

After Balasubramaniam wrote the story exclusively for Ganesan, director K. Shankar and producer Noor were attached. Ganesan however refused, and the story was later filmed in Kannada as Kasturi Nivasa (1971). After that film's success, Ganesan agreed to act in a potential Tamil remake, which became Avandhan Manidhan, his 175th film as an actor. The new film was directed by Tirulokchandar, produced by A. Ramanujam and K. N. Subramanian, photographed by M. Viswanatha Rai and edited by B. Kandhasamy.

Avandhan Manidhan was released on 11 April 1975. The film became a commercial success, running for over 100 days in theatres.

== Plot ==
Ravikumar, the owner of a matchbox factory, is a widower who also lost his daughter in an accident. Recognising that his honest employee Chandran is in a similar position, he decides to help Chandran financially. As Chandran attends training in the United States, Ravi takes care of Chandran's charming daughter. Upon his return, Chandran suggests changing the company's structure. The traditionalist Ravi becomes infuriated. Protesting this, Chandran resigns and starts his own matchbox company and becomes the leading matchbox manufacturer.

This begins Ravi's downfall, his charity and donating activities have eaten up profit and he ends up putting his house on sale. Chandran calls for the highest bid and wants to give it back to Ravi, but being the man that he is, Ravi would not accept. Chandran has already got Lalitha, his ex-secretary whom Ravi had a crush on, and now Ravi's house.

Ravi is eventually left with only his dove and faithful servant Murugan. Lalitha requests Ravi to give the dove to her, as her daughter is sick and is crying for it. Murugan reveals that Ravi has just sold the dove so that he could buy food to serve to Lalitha. Unable to say no to a request, Ravi breathes his last.

== Cast ==
- Sivaji Ganesan as Ravikumar
- Manjula as Manju
- Jayalalithaa as Lalitha
- Muthuraman as Chandran
- Major Sundarrajan as Murugan
- Chandrababu as Singaram
- M. R. R. Vasu as Paramasivam
- Cho as Appavu
- Sachu as Kamala
- Baby Sumathi as Selvi
- Master Kumar as Ravikumar's daughter (uncredited)
- Seema as Dancer (uncredited)
- S. R. Janaki as Grandmother

== Production ==
In early 1970, G. Balasubramaniam had written a story exclusively for Sivaji Ganesan, and film producer Noor bought the rights for ₹ 25,000, with K. Shankar signed on to direct. However, Ganesan was reluctant after hearing the story, feeling it was too tragic. A year later, the same story was bought by the director duo Dorai–Bhagavan for ₹ 38,000, and they made it into a Kannada film titled Kasturi Nivasa, with Rajkumar starring. After the film's success, Ganesan decided to remake it in Tamil, and bought the remake rights for ₹ 2,00,000. The remake was titled Avandhan Manidhan, and the 175th film of Ganesan. It was directed by A. C. Tirulokchandar, co-produced by K. N. Subramaniam, photographed by M. Viswanatha Rai and edited by B. Kandhasamy. While Tirulokchandar also wrote the screenplay, Panchu Arunachalam wrote the dialogues. In October 1973, the film's makers planned to shoot scenes at Singapore, Indonesia and Malaysia. Some scenes involving Ganesan and Manjula were shot at Singapore, including Queen Elizabeth Walk.

== Themes ==
Film historian Mohan Raman interpreted one scene where Cho's character tells Chandrababu's character, "Ellarum Ungala Marandutaanga pa" (transl. Everyone has forgotten you, man) as reflecting Chandrababu's real life situation at that time. Another historian, K. Puttaswamy noted the story's similarities to Timon of Athens, a play by William Shakespeare.

== Soundtrack ==
The music was composed by M. S. Viswanathan, with lyrics by Kannadasan. The song "Aattuviththaal Yaaroruvar", like many songs written by Kannadasan, extols the Hindu god Krishna. The song "Anbu Nadamadum" is set in Vasanthi raga. An assistant director suggested the director not to use the lyric "Thangai" (transl. younger sister) for a song in this film since "Thangaiyila Illai" (transl. not in the younger sister) was the pallavi for a song in the director's earlier film Dharmam Engey (1972).

Song	Singers	Length
"Jalitha Vanitha" (Oonjalukku)	T. M. Soundararajan	05:44
"Anbu Nadamadum"	T. M. Soundararajan, P. Susheela	04:41
"Ah...Engirundho Oru Kural"	Vani Jairam	04:20
"Aattuviththaal Yaaroruvar"	T. M. Soundararajan	04:09
"Manidhan Ninaippadhundu"	T. M. Soundararajan	04:52

== Release and reception ==
Avandhan Manidhan was released on 11 April 1975, by Sivaji Productions. Kanthan of Kalki praised Tirulokchander's direction and writing, Arunachalam's dialogues, and the performances of Ganesan, Muthuraman and Sundarrajan. The film became a commercial success, running for over 100 days in theatres.
