= Man-Mauji =

Man Mauji
- Poster
- Directed by: Krishnan–Panju
- Written by: Rajendra Krishan (dialogues)
- Story by: K. V. Reddy; D. V. Narasa Raju; D. Madhusudhana Rao
- Produced by: A.V. Meiyappan
- Starring: Kishore Kumar; Sadhana
- Cinematography: S. Maruthi Rao
- Edited by: S. Panjabi; R. Vittal
- Music by: Madan Mohan
- Production company: AVM Productions
- Release date: 1962
- Country: India
- Language: Hindi

Man Mauji (transl. Capricious minded) is a 1962 Indian Hindi-language film starring Kishore Kumar and Sadhana Shivdasani in lead roles and directed by Krishnan–Panju. It was Jayalalitha's first Hindi film, in which she played Lord Krishna in a 3-minutes dance sequence with Naaz, who played Radha in the same dance program. The film was a remake of Telugu film Donga Ramudu.

== Cast ==
- Kishore Kumar as Raja
- Sadhana Shivdasani as Rani
- Pran as Jagga
- Om Prakash as Rai Sahib Bholaram
- Sulochana Chatterjee as Mrs. Bholaram
- Durga Khote as Mohan's Mother
- Leela Chitnis as Bhagwanti
- Achala Sachdev as Kamla Bai
- Mohan Choti as Seetaram
- Mukri as Darbarilal
- Anwar Hussain as Advocate
- Ashim Kumar as Dr. Mohan
- Naaz as Laxmi
- Baby Farida as Advocate's Daughter
- Master Shahid as Advocate's Son
- Sunder as Schoolmaster
- Jayalalitha as Lord Krishna

== Soundtrack ==
All the songs were composed by Madan Mohan and lyrics were penned by Rajinder Krishan.

The song "Zaroorat Hai, Zaroorat Hai" sung by Kishore Kumar was a super-hit number and is still sung with comic connotation.

Song	Singer
"Zaroorat Hai, Zaroorat Hai"	Kishore Kumar
"Bura Lagta Hai Lage"	Kishore Kumar
"Ek Tha Abdul Rehman, Ek Thi Abdul Rehmaniya"	Kishore Kumar, Lata Mangeshkar
"Aaya Hai Kahan Se Peeke"	Lata Mangeshkar
"Chanda Ja Re Ja Re"	Lata Mangeshkar
"Main To Tum Sang"	Lata Mangeshkar
"Murge Ne Jhuth Bola"-1	Kamal Barot
"Murge Ne Jhuth Bola"-2	Asha Bhosle
