= Donga Ramudu (1955 film) =

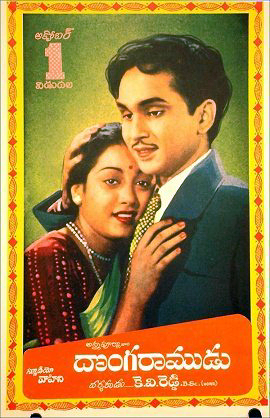
- Theatrical release poster
- Directed by: K. V. Reddy
- Screenplay by: K. V. Reddy
- Story by: K. V. Reddy; D. V. Narasa Raju; D. Madhusudhana Rao
- Dialogue by: D. V. Narasa Raju
- Produced by: D. Madhusudhana Rao
- Starring: Akkineni Nageswara Rao; Savitri; Jamuna; Jaggayya
- Cinematography: Adi M. Irani
- Edited by: M. S. Mani
- Music by: Pendyala
- Production company: Annapurna Studios
- Release date: 1 October 1955
- Running time: 197 minutes
- Country: India
- Language: Telugu

Donga Ramudu (transl. Ramudu, the thief) is a 1955 Indian Telugu-language drama film co-written and directed by K. V. Reddy. It stars Akkineni Nageswara Rao, Savitri, Jamuna, and Jaggayya, with music composed by Pendyala. The film was produced by D. Madhusudhana Rao under the Annapurna Pictures banner.

Donga Ramudu is the debut production of Annapurna Pictures. Released on October 1, 1955, the film became a super hit. Donga Ramudu established Annapurna Pictures as a top banner. The film was archived in the curriculum of the Film and Television Institute of India. Donga Ramudu was dubbed in Tamil as Thiruttu Raman (1956) and was commercially successful. It was later remade in Hindi as Man-Mauji (1962) and again in Tamil as Vasanthi (1988).

== Cast ==
- Akkineni Nageswara Rao as Ramudu
- Savitri as Seeta
- Jamuna as Lakshmi Mohan
- Jaggayya as Dr. Mohan
- Relangi as Veerabhadrayya
- Suryakantham
- R. Nageswara Rao as Babulu
- Allu Ramalingaiah
- Vangara as School teacher
- Mikkilineni
- Dr. Sivaramakrishnayya
- Hemalatha as Subbamma
- Vinnakota Ramanna Panthulu
- Padmanabham as Driver
- Chalam
- Balakrishna as Cook
- Kuchala Kumari as Dancer (Song Levoyi Chinnavada)

== Production ==
After Akkineni Nageswara Rao became a major movie star, his friend and mentor, Dukkipati Madhusudana Rao felt it was the right time to launch their own production company. They established Annapurna Pictures (P) Ltd, named after Madhusudana Rao’s stepmother. Besides Madhusudana Rao and Nageswara Rao, the company had other partners. P. S. Ramakrishna Rao and P. Pullayya who gave memorable hits with Nageswara Rao were approached to direct Annapurna's debut venture but could not commit due to various reasons. Nageswara Rao had a wish to work with K. V. Reddy and when they met him, K. V. Reddy obliged on condition that they have to wait till he completed Pedda Manushulu (1954).

D. V. Narasaraju, the writer of Pedda Manushulu was chosen to pen the story and dialogues. Since he was directing Nageswara Rao for the first time, K. V. Reddy thought it should be different from the actor's earlier films. He suggested that he pen a story on a brother-sister sentiment with the brother going to any extent, even giving up his life for the sake of his sister. Madhusudana Rao recollected a short story, Loving Brothers that he had read in an anthology of American short stories. In the story, the elder brother commits robberies to educate his younger brother. Taking that point replacing the younger brother with a sister, Narasaraju, Madhusudana Rao and K. V. Reddy wrote the story of Donga Ramudu.

Akkineni Nageswara Rao and R. Nageswara Rao took special coaching from stunt director Raghavulu for the wrestling scene in the film. K. V. Reddy’s children were featured in the song "Bhale Thatha Mana Bapuji".

== Soundtrack ==
Donga Ramudu

Film score by Pendyala
- Released: 1955
- Genre: Soundtrack
- Length: 28:43
- Producer: Pendyala

Music was composed by Pendyala.

Telugu songs

Lyrics were written by Samudrala Sr in a month.

S. No.	Song title	Singers	length
1	"Chigurakulalo Chilakamma"	Ghantasala, Jikki	3:04
2	"Bhale Thatha Mana Bapuji"	P. Suseela	2:50
3	"Raroyi Maa Intiki"	Jikki, Maddali Krishnamurthy	2:43
4	"Cherasala Palainava"	Ghantasala	3:22
5	"Levoyi Chinnavada"	Jikki	3:37
6	"Telisindaa Babu"	P. Susheela	2:58
7	"Anda Chandala Sogasari Vaadu"	Jikki	3:14
8	"Anuragamu Virisena"	P. Susheela	2:54
9	"Balagopala"	P. Susheela	4:01

Tamil songs

Lyrics were by Kanaga Surabhi and Kannadasan. All the tunes for all the songs and singers for both languages are the same.

No.	Song	Singers	Lyrics	Length (m:ss)
1	"Oo Siruchaalaiyil Or Kuyilamma"	Ghantasala & Jikki	Kannadasan	3:04
2	"Bale Saadhu Engal Baabuji"	P. Suseela	Kanaga Surabhi	2:50
3	"Vaarungal Vaarungalen Maamo"	Jikki	Kannadasan	2:43
4	"Oor Sirikka Per Edutthaayaa"	Ghantasala	Kanaga Surabhi	3:22
5	"Engaadhe Chinna Maamaa Nee"	Jikki	Kanaga Surabhi	3:37
6	"Thrinjukko Baabu Ippove Thrinjukko Baabu"	P. Suseela	Kannadasan	2:58
7	"Kannil Kandaalum Sugam Tharum Veeran"	Jikki	Kannadasan	3:14
8	"Endhan Kaadhalum Malaraadhaa Solvaai Raajaa"	P. Suseela	Kannadasan	2:54
9	"Balagopala"	P. Suseela	Jayadeva	4:01

== Release and Reception ==
The film released on October 1, 1955 and became a super hit. Donga Ramudu was dubbed in Tamil as Thiruttu Raman (1956).

== Legacy ==
Donga Ramudu established Annapurna Pictures as a top banner in Telugu cinema. It was later remade in Hindi as Man-Mauji (1962) and again in Tamil as Vasanthi (1988).

Narasaraju created catchy words such as ‘gas’ for telling a lie which remains popular to this day. R. Nageswara Rao’s famous dialogue, Babulu gaadi debba ante Golconda abba anali, also became popular. The film was archived in the curriculum of the Film and Television Institute of India for its excellence in filmmaking.
