= Athey Kangal (1967 film) =

1967 film by A. C. Tirulokchandar

- Theatrical release poster
- Directed by: A. C. Tirulokchandar
- Story by: A. C. Tirulokchandar
- Produced by: A. V. Meiyappan; M. Murugan; M. Kumaran; M. Saravanan; M. Balasubramanian; M. S. Guhan
- Starring: Ravichandran; Kanchana
- Cinematography: S. Maruti Rao
- Edited by: R. G. Gope
- Music by: Vedha
- Production company: Balasubramanian & Co.
- Release date: 26 May 1967
- Running time: 175 minutes
- Country: India
- Language: Tamil

Athey Kangal (pronounced [aðeː kaɳɡaɭ] transl. The Same Eyes) is a 1967 Indian Tamil-language mystery thriller film written and directed by A. C. Tirulokchandar. The film stars Ravichandran and Kanchana. It focuses on a girl's family being stalked by a masked murderer, and her lover's attempts to apprehend him.

Athey Kangal was produced by A. V. Meiyappan under Balasubramanian & Co, a subsidiary of his company AVM Productions. It was simultaneously filmed in Telugu as Ave Kallu, with Kanchana reprising her role. The film was released on 26 May 1967 and became a major box-office success.

== Plot ==
A woman named Vasantha finds her husband Ranganathan murdered. A masked murderer tries to kill her too, but she escapes from him. Vasantha is left in a state of shock and becomes mentally paralysed. A case is registered and the investigation takes place.

Susi, a college student, along with her friends arrives at Vasantha's for her vacation. There live her younger paternal uncles Kamalanathan and Vimalanathan, aunt Vasantha, butler Appukutty Nair and a regular visiting Siddha doctor Vedamurthy. During her stay, a series of murders take place at the house with every time a cigar bit being intentionally left by the murderer .

Since Vasantha is the only eyewitness of her husband's murder, her life is in danger. Despite tight security, she is killed by the murderer, who later makes frequent calls to Susi and threatens that she will be his next target. Susi is frustrated by the incidents happening at the house and the threatening phone calls. She requests help from her colleague Baskar, who promises her to help.

Baskar investigates Vimalanathan, Kamalanathan and the inmates of the house. One day, Baskar follows Kamalanathan to a strange house, where he meets a woman. She is revealed to be Kamalanathan's lover Mala, who was rescued some years back by him when she attempted suicide. Kamalanathan keeps quiet as he wants Susi to get married first, only then he would marry Mala.

As a part of investigation, Baskar asks everyone in the house to stay out for a night, to lure the murderer. As expected, the murderer enters Susi's room to kill her. Baskar tries to unmask the murderer, but only sees his eyes before the murderer escapes, leaving his mask behind. Baskar finds Vimalanathan murdered at the doorstep.

Kamalanathan rushes everyone to vacate the house following the celebration of Susi's birthday party. On the day of the party, the murderer tries to attack Susi, but Baskar saves her. Baskar chases the murderer, but loses track. On his way back, he sees Vedamurthy injured at a place. He rescues him and comes home. Everyone is unaware of the reason of the murder, where Baskar insists Kamalanathan in front of everyone to tell about his family which might help them to get a clue of the murders.

Kamalanathan reveals that his father had an extramarital affair with a woman, but the woman and her 10-year-old son died in a fire set by Kamalanathan's elder brother (Susi's father). Baskar theorises that the son may not have died and is actually the murderer killing the family members in vengeance; he also states that the murderer may be present amongst them as he plans accordingly knowing the circumstances of the house. Baskar places the murderer's mask on the face of each man present to verify whose eyes match with the murderer's eyes, ultimately exposing Vedamurthy, who was disguised using prosthetics, as the murderer.

Baskar chases the murderer, who gets injured while trying to escape and is struggling to run. While the police shoot the murderer, he disappears in a tunnelway near the garden. Everyone finds a secret room beneath the garden which leads to the murderer's house and his corpse, realising this is how he escaped after committing each murder. Baskar later marries Susi and stays in the same house, while Kamalanathan marries Mala.

== Cast ==
Male cast

- Ravichandran as Baskar
- S. A. Ashokan as Kamalanathan
- Nagesh as Baskar's friend
- S. V. Ramadas as Vimalanathan
- A. Karunanidhi as Appukutty Nair
- P. D. Sambandam
- Vasanthakumar as Vedamurthy
- Typist Gopuas Baby Baskar's friend
- K. Balaji as the family doctor
- Major Sundarrajan as the police officer

Female cast

- Kanchana as Suseela (Susi)
- Madhavi Krishnan as Julie
- Geethanjali as Mala
- G. Sakunthala as Vasantha

== Production ==
AVM Productions built a huge house set for Mehrban (1967); however A. V. Meiyappan felt the richness of the set was never felt in the film so he decided not to dismantle the set. Director A. C. Tirulokchandar who visited the set felt this house would fit in for a film in the thriller genre and decided to make a film on in this set, which became Athey Kangal. The script was completed in one week, and took inspiration from various Hindi horror/thrillers such as Bhoot Bungla (1965), Bees Saal Baad (1962) and Gumnaam (1965). The comedy track was written by T. N. Balu. The film was produced by Meiyappan under Balasubramanian & Co, a subsidiary of AVM. The assistant producers were M. Murugan, M. Kumaran, M. Saravanan, M. Balasubramanian and M. S. Guhan. The dialogue was written by Balu, cinematography was handled by S. Maruti Rao, and editing by R. G. Gope. Ravichandran, who played the lead role, received a salary of ₹10,000 (equivalent to ₹530,000 or US$5,500 in 2023). It was simultaneously filmed in Telugu as Ave Kallu, with Kanchana as the lead actress in both. The final cut of the film measured 4,519 metres (14,826 ft).

== Soundtrack ==
The soundtrack was composed by Vedha and the lyrics were written by Vaali. The song "Ethanai Azhagu" is based on "Pedal Pusher" by The Ventures, and was recorded using 60 instruments. The song "Boom Boom Maattukaran" is based on "Chim Chim Cher-ee" from Mary Poppins (1964). For the song "Pombale Oruthi Irundaalaam", singers A. L. Raghavan and T. M. Soundararajan came up with lines in their first language Saurashtra. The words "Sodija" and "Daakara" in the song are presented as gibberish that Nagesh's character uses to frighten Kanchana's, but they actually mean "Leave me and go" and "I am afraid" in Saurashtra.

Track listing
No.	Title	Singer(s)	Length
1.	"Pombala Oruthi"	T. M. Soundararajan, A. L. Raghavan
2.	"Ethanai Azhagu"	T. M. Soundararajan, P. Susheela
3.	"Ennannamo Naan Ninaithen"	P. Susheela
4.	"Can Can" (Instrumental)	—
5.	"Boom Boom Maattukaran"	P. Susheela
6.	"Chinna Penn"	T. M. Soundararajan, P. Susheela
7.	"Va Arugil Va"	P. Susheela
8.	"Kannukku Theriyatha"	T. M. Soundararajan

== Release and reception ==
Athey Kangal was released on 26 May 1967, and became a major box-office success upon release. Kalki appreciated the film for its opulence, picturisation and colour.

== Bibliography ==
- Cowie, Peter; Elley, Derek (1977). World Filmography: 1967. Fairleigh Dickinson University Press. ISBN 978-0-498-01565-6.
- Saravanan, M. (2013) [2005]. AVM 60 Cinema (in Tamil) (3rd ed.). Rajarajan Pathippagam. OCLC 1158347612.
