= Naanum Oru Penn =

1963 film by A. C. Tirulokchandar

- Theatrical release poster
- Directed by: A. C. Tirulokchandar
- Screenplay by: A. C. Tirulokchandar; K. P. Kottarakkara (uncredited)
- Based on: Bodhu by Sri Shailesh Dey
- Produced by: M. Saravanan; M. Kumaran; M. Murugan
- Starring: S. S. Rajendran; R. Vijayakumari
- Cinematography: T. Muthusamy
- Edited by: R. G. Gopi
- Music by: R. Sudarsanam
- Production company: Murugan Brothers
- Release date: 7 June 1963
- Running time: 155 minutes
- Country: India
- Language: Tamil

Naanum Oru Penn (transl. I too am a woman) is a 1963 Indian Tamil-language drama film directed by A. C. Tirulokchandar and written by K. P. Kottarakkara. The film stars S. S. Rajendran and R. Vijayakumari, with S. V. Ranga Rao, M. R. Radha, S. V. Subbaiah, C. K. Nagesh, Rajan and C. S. Pushpalatha in supporting roles. It revolves around an uneducated, dark complexioned girl and how she convinces everyone that character is more important for a woman than appearance and education.

Naanum Oru Penn is an adaptation of Sri Shailesh Dey's Bengali play Bodhu. The film is the second production of Murugan Brothers, a subsidiary of AVM Productions, and the feature film debut of Rajan. The soundtrack and background score were composed by R. Sudarsanam, while the lyrics for the songs were written by Kannadasan, Panchu Arunachalam, Ku. Ma. Balasubramaniam and V. Seetharaman.

Naanum Oru Penn was released on 7 June 1963. The film earned positive critical feedback and went on to become a commercial success. It won many awards, including the National Film Award for Best Tamil Feature Film, the Filmfare Award for Best Tamil Film and Cinema Fans Award for Best Film. The film was remade in Hindi as Main Bhi Ladki Hoon (1964) and Telugu as Naadi Aada Janme (1965). Both the versions were directed by Tirulokachander with Ranga Rao reprising his role.

== Plot ==
The Zamindar of Selvapuram is unable to get over the death of his wife and continues grieving her. His sons Bhaskar and Balu live with him. Sabapathi, the Zamindar's brother-in-law, lives in the same house with his wife and son and secretly lusts for the Zamindar's wealth. Bhaskar, the older son, desires to marry an attractive and educated girl. Balu and his collegemate Malathi are lovers.

Kali, the Zamindar's trusted servant, advises the Zamindar to have Bhaskar married, believing the bride would fill the void left by the Zamindar's wife. The Zamindar tasks Sabapathi with finding a girl for Bhaskar. Sabapathi cunningly schemes to have Bhaskar marry Kalyani, a dark-skinned, illiterate girl whose brother Chidambaram is a grocer. He takes Balu and Bhaskar to Chidambaram's house. There, he tricks them by presenting Kalyani's younger sister, revealed to be the more attractive Malathi. Bhaskar agrees, and Balu becomes disheartened. The Zamindar agrees to the marriage without having seen the bride.

On the day of the marriage, the truth is revealed and everyone abuses Kalyani. But to protect her grace and his esteem, Bhaskar decides to continue with the marriage. Sabapathi, to save himself, pins the manipulation on Chidambaram. The Zamindar, who is displeased over not getting an attractive daughter-in-law, cancels the reception arrangements, and refuses to bless the newly married couple. He treats Kalyani poorly and she becomes depressed. Kalyani, oblivious to Sabapathi's machinations, apologises to Bhaskar and he wholeheartedly accepts her. The Zamindar too gradually begins to accept her.

Months later, Kalyani becomes pregnant. Bhaskar, unaware that Kalyani cannot read, sends her a letter asking her to prepare dinner for his visiting friends and appear presentable, but is dismayed when neither instruction is followed. He berates her until she apologises and confesses that she is illiterate; Kalyani explains that, following her parents' death, she sacrificed her education to support Malathi. Kalyani's trauma causes her to miscarry.

Kalyani decides to learn to read, and Balu agrees to help her; they decide on nighttime tuitions to conceal Kalyani's illiteracy from the others. While Bhaskar is in Delhi, Sabapathi tries to steal valuables from the safe, but Kalyani thwarts him. In revenge, he tells the Zamindar of an extramarital affair between her and Balu. While Kalyani is attending tuition in Balu's room, the Zamindar spots them together; he throws them out of the house after believing Sabapathi's lies, despite them pleading innocent.

In Delhi, Bhaskar finds his friend Mohan unconscious on the road after drinking. Mohan says his attractive wife abandoned him and tells Bhaskar that character and culture matter more than beauty, education and sophistication. A regretful Bhaskar returns to Selvapuram to meet Kalyani. He learns that she and Balu were thrown out of the house due to their alleged affair. Bhaskar refuses to believe that story; after unsuccessfully trying to pacify his father, Bhaskar too leaves the house.

The Zamindar goes into depression, becomes ill and bedridden. Seizing the change to usurp the Zamindar's wealth, Sabapathi requests him to sign a document giving himself certain properties, concealing the fact that it means his entire wealth. Meanwhile Kalyani, on learning of the Zamindar's condition, rushes to meet him. Just before the Zamindar signs the document without having read the full content, Kalyani snatches it and exposes Sabapathi's foul play by reading the full content aloud, much to the surprise of the Zamindar, Bhaskar, Balu and Kali, while Sabapathi escapes. The Zamindar understands Kalyani's noble character and apologises. With the family reunited, the Zamindar fixes Balu and Malathi's marriage.

== Cast ==
- S. S. Rajendran as Bhaskar
- R. Vijayakumari as Kalyani
- S. V. Ranga Rao as the Zamindar
- M. R. Radha as Sabapathi
- S. V. Subbaiah as Kali
- C. K. Nagesh as Chidambaram
- Rajan as Balu
- C. S. Pushpalatha as Malathi
- C. K. Saraswathi as Sabapathi's wife
- S. A. Ashokan as Mohan (guest appearance)

== Production ==
=== Development ===
After watching the Bengali play Bodhu, A. V. Meiyappan of AVM Productions was impressed and decided to adapt it into a Tamil film. A. C. Tirulokchandar was selected to direct the film, titled Naanum Oru Penn. It was produced by Meiyappan's sons Murugan, Saravanan and Kumaran under Murugan Brothers, a subsidiary of AVM. Naanum Oru Penn was the second production of Murugan Brothers. The producers wanted K. P. Kottarakkara to write the screenplay and he agreed, but Tirulokchandar, a screenwriter himself, was against anyone writing the screenplay under his direction. However, the producers remained resolute and persuaded him to co-operate with Kottarakkara in the screenwriting process. Tirulokchandar relented under the condition that he be credited as the sole screenwriter. Cinematography was handled by T. Muthusamy and editing by R. G. Gopi. Sowcar Janaki, in an interview with Kalki in 1993, said that Naanum Oru Penn was based on the 1955 Telugu film Kanyadaanam in which she acted.

=== Casting ===
The crew initially wanted Gemini Ganesan and Savitri as Bhaskar and Kalyani; however Tirulokchandar was adamant and chose S. S. Rajendran and R. Vijayakumari instead. The make-up for Vijayakumari was done by Kini. Vijayakumari initially had apprehension of portraying the character since many people warned her not to spoil her career by doing this character, but Sivaji Ganesan encouraged her to act in this film. This was the feature film debut of Rajan, who later prefixed AVM to his name; he portrayed Bhaskar's brother Balu. Rajan and C. S. Pushpalatha, who portrayed Kalyani's sister Malathi, met during the film's production, fell in love and got married. C. K. Nagesh initially charged ₹10,000 (equivalent to ₹830,000 or US$8,600 in 2023) for portraying Kalyani's brother Chidambaram, while AVM suggested half the price; he finally agreed for ₹6,000 (equivalent to ₹500,000 or US$5,200 in 2023). This was Nagesh's first film with AVM.

=== Filming ===
The song "Yemara Sonnadhu" was shot at main road of Vidhan Soudha, Bangalore with Karnataka Assembly building in the background. It was later reshot at Vijaya Garden in Madras as the Censor Board objected to the scene where Rajan and Pushpalatha's characters are shown dancing in NCC costumes. A scene required Chidambaram to cry over the misfortune of his sister Kalyani; Nagesh was concerned whether people would accept such a scene due to his reputation as a comedian, but Tirulokchander encouraged him; everyone was impressed after watching the filmed footage.

While discussing the ending, the team felt this film's end should be tragic with S. V. Ranga Rao and Vijayakumari's characters dying as they felt Pasamalar (1961) succeeded because of its tragic climax and wanted to repeat it; however Meiyappan decided to have a happy ending as he wanted Vijayakumari's character to lead a happy life. The final length of the film's prints were initially over 16,000 ft (4,900 m), at a time when films were generally 15,000 ft (4,600 m); it was edited down to 4,520 m (14,830 ft).

== Soundtrack ==
The soundtrack was composed by R. Sudarsanam. The tune of the song "Kanna Karumai" was created before the lyrics had been written. Saravanan was not happy with the lyrics provided by the lyricist despite it matching the tune, so Kannadasan was approached. According to Saravanan, "He said the lyric should precede the music, and also insisted that the pallavi should present the basic theme of the film. Thus was born ‘Kanna karumai nira Kanna,’ which we then set to tune".

Track listing
| No. | Title | Lyrics | Singer(s) | Length |
|---|---|---|---|---|
| 1. | "Poopola Poopola" | Panchu Arunachalam | P. Susheela, T. M. Soundararajan | 3:54 |
| 2. | "Yemaara Sonnathu" (female) | Ku. Ma. Balasubramaniam | P. Susheela | 3:17 |
| 3. | "Kannaa Karumai" | Kannadasan | P. Susheela | 3:21 |
| 4. | "Yemaara Sonnathu" (male) | Ku. Ma. Balasubramaniam | T. M. Soundararajan | 3:06 |
| Total length: | | | | 18:00 |

== Release ==
Naanum Oru Penn was released on 7 June 1963. It became a commercial success, completing a theatrical run of 25 weeks, and becoming a silver jubilee film.

=== Reception ===
The Tamil magazine Ananda Vikatan, in its original review of the film dated 30 June 1963 mentioned that though many had acted well, Ranga Rao deserved the first prize for acting in the film for making viewers cry in a few places. T. M. Ramachandran, writing for Sport and Pastime, praised the film for Tirulokchandar's "imaginative screenplay and skilful direction", the performances of Vijayakumari, Rajendran, Ranga Rao, Rajan and Pushpalatha, and the music by Sudarsanam. Kanthan of Kalki appreciated many aspects of the film, including Tirulokchandar's execution of the story, the cast performances, the music and the cinematography. Politician Jothi Venkatachalam, then the minister for public health in Madras, appreciated the film for its quality and gave souvenirs to the cast and crew during the film's 100th day celebrations.

=== Accolades ===
The film won the National Film Award for Best Tamil Feature Film at 11th National Film Awards. It also won Filmfare Award for Best Film and Film Fans Award for Best Film.

== Remakes ==
Naanum Oru Penn was remade in Telugu as Naadi Aada Janme and in Hindi as Main Bhi Ladki Hoon. Both versions, released in 1964, were directed by Tirulokachander and featured Ranga Rao reprising his role. The song "Kanna Karumai" was reused in the Hindi remake. The film was also remade in Malayalam as Hridhayathinte Nirangal (1979).

== Legacy ==
Naanum Oru Penn is considered a landmark film in Tamil cinema for "the role of women". Historian G. Dhananjayan considers it "the first film to address the relevant theme of what is needed in a woman for a happy family", attributing its success to this.

== Bibliography ==
- Dhananjayan, G. (2014). Pride of Tamil Cinema: 1931–2013. Blue Ocean Publishers. OCLC 898765509.
- Raghavendra, M. K., ed. (2017). Beyond Bollywood: The Cinemas of South India. HarperCollins. OCLC 1015680442.
- Saravanan, M. (2013) [2005]. AVM 60 Cinema (in Tamil) (3rd ed.). Rajarajan Pathippagam. OCLC 1158347612.
