= D. V. Narasa Raju =

Indian writer

- Born: Datla Venkata Narasa Raju; 15 July 1920; Guntur district krosur mandal 88-Thalluru
- Died: 28 August 2006 (aged 86); Hyderabad, India
- Citizenship: India
- Children: 1 daughter
- Writing career
- Genres: Writer, Director, Playwright
- Notable work: Tera Venuka Kathalu Autobiography

D.V. Narasaraju or Datla Venkata Narasaraju (Telugu: డి.వి.నరసరాజు; 15 July 1920 – 28 August 2006) was a writer and director of South India films and playwright. He wrote stories such as Gundamma Katha, Yamagola, and Donga Ramudu.

Narasa Raju was highly motivated by M. N. Roy and his party-free politics.

He died on 28 August 2006 at Care Hospital.

== Autobiography (Adrusthavantuni Aatmakatha) ==
As he could not write such vast work in his 80s, Mr. Ravi Adabala, an Advocate and his friend advised to record in audio tapes. He requested Mr Ravi Adabala to listen and record his speech. Mr.Ravi Adabala obliged his request and did so. His speech recorded in 10 Micro cassettes. The recording process took three months from March 2000, Later the recordings were transcribed and published. The Book was released by Dr. Akkineni Nageswara Rao in the year 2006. After some months he died of illness at the age of 86.

== Filmography ==
Writer

1. Peddamanushulu (1954) (writer)
2. Donga Ramudu (1955) (dialogue)
3. Sobha (1958) (dialogue)
4. Raja Makutam (1959) (dialogue) (story)
5. Renukadevi Mahatyam (1960) (writer)
6. Gundamma Katha (1962) (dialogue)
7. Man-Mauji (1962) (story)
8. Mohini Rugmangada (1962) (writer)
9. Ramudu Bheemudu (1964) (writer)
10. Naadi Aada Janme (1965) (writer)
11. C. I. D. (1965) (dialogues)
12. Rangula Ratnam (1966) (dialogue)
13. Bhakta Prahlada (1967) (adaptation) (dialogue)
14. Chadarangam (1967) (dialogue) (story)
15. Gruhalakshmi (1967) (dialogue)
16. Bandhavyalu (1968) (dialogue)
17. Tikka Shankaraiah (1968)
18. Mooga Nomu (1969) (dialogue)
19. Jai Jawan (1970)
20. Badi Panthulu (1972) (dialogues)
21. Iddaru Ammayilu (1972) (dialogue)
22. Vaade Veedu (1973)
23. Magaadu (1976)
24. Yamagola (1977) (dialogue)
25. KD No:1 (1979)
26. Yugandhar (1979) (dialogue)
27. Srungara Ramudu (1979)
28. Vayyari Bhamulu Vagalamari Bhartalu (1982) (writer)
29. Sri Ranga Neethulu (1983)
30. Kanchana Ganga (1984) (writer)
31. Muchataga Mugguru (1985) (dialogues)
32. Karu Diddina Kapuram (1986) (writer and director)
33. Rao Gari Illu (1988)
34. Brundavanam (1992) (writer)

Actor

1. Manasu Mamata (1990) (writer and actor)
2. Chevilo Puvvu (1990) (actor)

== Awards ==
- Nandi Award for Best Story Writer - Chadarangam (1967)
