= Aloke Dasgupta =

- Born: India
- Genres: Hindustani classical music
- Instrument: Sitar
- Website: aloke.ragaranjani.org/bio.html

Aloke Dasgupta is an Indian sitar player in the North Indian classical tradition. He lives in the United States in Torrance, California.

Dasgupta studied under the sarod player Ali Akbar Khan, and has performed with George Harrison, V.G. Jog, the Los Angeles Philharmonic and The Rolling Stones, among others.
