= Thalluru =

- Village
- Interactive map of Thalluru
- Location in Andhra Pradesh, India
- Coordinates: 16.513°N 80.113°E
- Country: India
- State: Andhra Pradesh
- District: Palnadu district
- Mandal: Krosuru

Government
  - Type: Panchayati raj
  - Body: Talluru gram panchayat

Area
  - Total: 1,085 ha (2,680 acres)

Population (2011)
  - Total: 4,217
  - Density: 388.7/km^{2} (1,007/sq mi)

Languages
  - Official: Telugu
- Time zone: UTC+5:30 (IST)
- PIN: 522410
- Area code: +91–08640
- Vehicle registration: AP

Thalluru is a village in Palnadu district of the Indian state of Andhra Pradesh. It is located in Krosuru mandal of Guntur revenue division. It forms a part of Andhra Pradesh Capital Region.

== Geography ==
Thalluru is situated to the southwest of the mandal headquarters, Krosuru, at 16.513°N 80.113°E. It is spread over an area of 1,085 ha (2,680 acres).

== Governance ==
Thalluru gram panchayat is the local self-government of the village. It is divided into wards and each ward is represented by a ward member.

== Education ==
As per the school information report for the academic year 2018–19, the village has a total of 5 Zilla Parishad/MPP schools.
