= Jaidev (film) =

1998 Kannada film directed by H. Vasu

- Directed by: H. Vasu
- Written by: M. D. Hasham; H. Vasu
- Produced by: Sa Ra Govindu
- Starring: Jaggesh; Charulatha; Doddanna
- Cinematography: J. G. Krishna
- Edited by: Shyam Yadav
- Music by: Rajesh Ramanath
- Release date: 1998
- Running time: 125 minutes
- Country: India
- Language: Kannada

Jaidev is a 1998 Indian Kannada language action drama film directed by H. Vasu who also wrote the screenplay for a story by M. D. Hasham. It film has musical score by Rajesh Ramanath. The film stars Jaggesh in the title role alongside an ensemble cast which includes Charulatha, Srinath, Doddanna, Ashok, Sumithra and Gurudatt. The film was produced by Sa Ra Govindu in the banner of Thanu Chithra.

The film narrates the story of two brothers, Dhanpal and Jaipal, who have supreme authority over their dead brother-in-law's wealth. However, when a stage comes that they are unable to keep their authority due to their brother-in-law's will which states that his son will be the next heir, they hire Jaidev, a young good doer to play that role. He is hoodwinked into believing that they are doing it for their sister. What happens later forms the crux of the story.

== Cast ==
- Jaggesh ... Jaidev"Devu"
- Charulatha ... Pavithra"Pavi"
- Srinath ... Lawyer Shiva
- Doddanna ... Dhanpal
- Sumithra ... Jaidev's mother
- Gurudatt ... Jaipal
- Ashok
- Krishne Gowda
- Harish Roy
- Pramila Joshai
- Honnavalli Krishna

== Soundtrack ==
Jaidev

Soundtrack album by Rajesh Ramanath
- Released: 1997 (initial release of tracks); 31 August 2014 (official release of soundtrack album)
- Recorded: 1997
- Studio: Maruthi Studio
- Genre: Feature film soundtrack
- Length: 25
- Language: Kannada
- Label: Lahari Music

Rajesh Ramanath chronology
Ranganna (1997)	Jaidev (1997)	Amar Akbar Anthony (1998)

The soundtrack album comprises 6 songs composed by Rajesh Ramanath.

No.	Title	Singers	Length
1.	"Mutthinantha"	L. N. Shastry	5:08
2.	"Minchu Minchu"	Rajesh Krishnan; K. S. Surekha	4:43
3.	"Amma Amma"	Sujatha Dutt	1:07
4.	"Hello Hello"	Rajesh Krishnan; Sowmya	4:32
5.	"Amma Amma"	L. N. Shastry	5:03
6.	"Boobi Boobi"	Rajesh Krishnan; K. S. Surekha	4:50
Total length:			25

== Others ==
The film was cleared with a U Certificate from the Censor Board after deletion of a few dialogues.

Sri Ganesh Video purchased the video rights of the film.
