= Naadi Aada Janme =

1965 film directed by A. C. Tirulokchandar

- Theatrical release poster
- Directed by: A. C. Trilokchandar
- Screenplay by: A. C. Trilokchandar
- Story by: Sri Sailesh Day
- Based on: Naanum Oru Penn (1963)
- Produced by: S. V. Ranga Rao
- Starring: N. T. Rama Rao; Savitri
- Cinematography: T. Muthu Swamy
- Edited by: R. G. Gopu
- Music by: R. Sudarsanam
- Production company: Srivani Films
- Release date: 7 January 1965
- Running time: 125 minutes
- Country: India
- Language: Telugu

Naadi Aada Janme (transl. I am also a woman) is a 1965 Indian Telugu-language drama film directed by A. C. Trilokchandar and produced by S. V. Ranga Rao. The film stars N. T. Rama Rao and Savitri in lead roles, with music composed by R. Sudarsanam. The film centres on a dark-complexioned, uneducated woman who proves to everyone that character is more important than appearance and education for a woman.

The film is a remake of the 1963 Tamil film Naanum Oru Penn, which in turn was an adaptation on the Bengali play Bodhu by Sri Shailash Dey. Both versions were directed by Trilokchandar, with S. V. Ranga Rao reprising his role in the Telugu adaptation. Naadi Aada Janme was a commercial success and went on to run for 100 days in 14 centres.

== Plot ==
Zamindar Vijaya Narasimha Rayalu, deeply affected by the death of his wife Parvati, wishes for his elder son, Bhaskar, an artist, to marry a woman who embodies her qualities. Bhaskar, in turn, dreams of marrying an educated and beautiful woman. Meanwhile, Dasaratha Ramayya, the Zamindar's scheming brother-in-law, plots to seize the family’s wealth by arranging Bhaskar's marriage to Kalyani, a woman with a dark complexion. Despite initial reluctance, Bhaskar marries Kalyani out of sympathy but remains indifferent to her.

Kalyani earns the affection of the Zamindar and Bhaskar’s younger brother Chandram through her kindness. Chandram falls in love with Kalyani’s sister, Malathi. Bhaskar discovers Kalyani is illiterate and harshly criticises her, leading to a tragic miscarriage. Determined to improve herself, Kalyani secretly seeks Chandram's help to become educated.

While Bhaskar travels to Delhi to participate in a national competition, Dasaratha Ramayya spreads rumours of an illicit relationship between Chandram and Kalyani. In Delhi, Bhaskar meets his childhood friend Mohan, who shares the story of his attractive wife who abandoned him. This encounter leads Bhaskar to recognise the importance of virtue over beauty.

Upon his return, Bhaskar learns of the rumours but dismisses them as false. Meanwhile, Dasaratha Ramayya intensifies his efforts to usurp the Zamindar's property. Kalyani exposes his schemes, reaffirming her integrity and earning the Zamindar’s trust. The family reconciles, and the film concludes with Chandram and Malathi’s marriage.

== Cast ==
- Savitri as Kalyani
- N. T. Rama Rao as Bhaskar
- S. V. Ranga Rao as Zamindar Vijaya Narasimha Rayalu
- Ramana Reddy as Dasaradha Ramayya
- Haranath as Chandram
- Allu Ramalingaiah as Simhadri Appanna
- Perumallu as Rangayya
- Jaggayya as Mohan (special appearance)
- Jamuna as Malathi
- Chaya Devi as Tayaramma
- Surabhi Balasaraswathi as Seeta

== Soundtrack ==
Music was composed by R. Sudarsanam. Lyrics were written by Dasarathi.

Song title	Singers	length
"Kallallo Gantulu"	Pithapuram, P. Suseela	4:27
"Naa Mata Nammitivela" (M)	Pithapuram	3:21
"Kannayya Nallani"	P. Suseela	4:48
"Chinnari Ponnari Puvvu"	Ghantasala, P. Suseela	3:29
"Naa Mata Nammiti" (F)	P. Suseela	3:13
