= A Letter to Three Wives =

1949 film by Joseph L. Mankiewicz

- Theatrical release poster
- Directed by: Joseph L. Mankiewicz
- Screenplay by: Joseph L. Mankiewicz
- Adaptation: Vera Caspary
- Based on: A Letter to Five Wives; 1946 novel by John Klempner
- Produced by: Sol C. Siegel
- Starring: Jeanne Crain; Linda Darnell; Ann Sothern; Kirk Douglas; Paul Douglas; Jeffrey Lynn
- Cinematography: Arthur C. Miller
- Edited by: J. Watson Webb Jr.
- Music by: Alfred Newman
- Production company: 20th Century-Fox
- Distributed by: 20th Century-Fox
- Release dates: January 20, 1949 (New York City); February 3, 1949 (United States)
- Running time: 103 minutes
- Country: United States
- Language: English
- Box office: $2.7 million (US/Canadian rentals)

A Letter to Three Wives is a 1949 American romantic drama film directed by Joseph L. Mankiewicz and starring Jeanne Crain, Linda Darnell and Ann Sothern. The film was adapted by Vera Caspary and written for the screen by Mankiewicz from A Letter to Five Wives, a short story by John Klempner which first appeared in Cosmopolitan magazine, and was expanded into a 1946 novel. The plot revolves around a letter that's addressed to three wives from their "best friend" Addie Ross, announcing that she is running away with one of their husbands but doesn't say which one.

The film received three nominations at the Academy Awards, including Best Picture. It won Best Director and Best Adapted Screenplay.

== Plot ==
Friends Deborah Bishop, Rita Phipps and Lora Mae Hollingsway are just about to take a group of children on a riverboat outing when they receive a message from their "dear friend" Addie Ross (heard but unseen during the film) informing them that she has left town and taken one of their husbands as a lover. However, Addie does not specify which woman's husband is involved. In flashbacks, each woman considers reasons why it might be hers.

The first flashback involves Deborah, who was raised on a farm. Her first experience with the outside world came when she joined the Navy WAVES during World War II, where she met her future husband Brad. When they return to civilian life, Deborah does not feel welcome in Brad's sophisticated social circle, and is uncomfortable as she prepares for her first country club dance. Adding to her insecurity, she learns everyone expected Brad to marry Addie, a woman on whom all three husbands lavish their attention.

Deborah is comforted by Brad's friend Rita, who writes stories for radio soap operas. Her husband George is a high school English teacher and enjoys inspiring his students. While Rita wishes George would be more ambitious, he is disappointed that Rita constantly caters to her boss, Mrs. Manleigh. Rita is so intent on pleasing Mrs. Manleigh that she invites the Manleighs for dinner and forgets George's birthday. When the Manleighs arrive, they are rude and displeased with George's sly critique of their beloved soaps. After they leave, George learns Rita was hoping he would be hired at the radio station and is upset at his wife's attitude.

Lora Mae grew up in poverty. She catches the eye of her boss - Porter, the older, divorced owner of a chain of department stores. Porter takes Lora Mae to dinner several times, but is frustrated when she tells him she's holding out for marriage. When Lora Mae sees a framed picture of Addie on the piano in Porter's mansion, she says she wants her picture on the piano and his home to become hers. Porter tells Lora Mae he's not interested in marriage and she ends the relationship. However, Porter skips Addie's New Year's Eve party to see Lora Mae and grudgingly "proposes" ("I'll marry you. How about it?") Lora Mae is less than thrilled, but kisses Porter regardless.

Back in real time, the women return from the outing. Rita is overjoyed to find George at home - his mysterious disappearance was simply a trip to the school where he taught. He tells Rita he had been asked to direct a play and the first rehearsal was that day. He and Rita reconcile, and she vows to not allow herself to be at Mrs. Manleigh's mercy any longer.

Porter is late coming home, causing Lora Mae to fear he has left with Addie. When he appears and hears his wife's suspicions, he accuses her of being happy at the thought of divorcing him and reaping a big chunk of his fortune. Nevertheless, he grumpily agrees to accompany her to the country club dance as planned.

When Deborah returns home, she learns Brad called and will not return that night. She is heartbroken at her perceived loss, but greets George and Rita glamorously dressed and goes to the dance with them. At the couples' table, Porter complains about Lora Mae dancing with another man. Deborah says Porter has no idea how much Lora Mae loves him. Porter scoffs, still certain Lora Mae sees him only as a money source.

Unable to take the strain any longer, Deborah decides to leave, announcing that Brad ran off with Addie. Porter stops her, confessing it was he who planned to flee, but changed his mind. As Deborah happily leaves for home, Porter tells Lora Mae that admitting his intended abandonment in front of George and Rita is enough for her to divorce him and take everything. To his shock, Lora Mae responds, "If you said something, I just didn't hear it." Finally convinced of her love, an overjoyed Porter asks her to dance and they kiss passionately, smiling at each other on the dance floor.

The voice of the still-unseen Addie Ross, who is left alone, bids the audience good night.

== Cast ==
- Jeanne Crain as Deborah Bishop
- Jeffrey Lynn as Bradbury "Brad" Bishop
- Linda Darnell as Lora Mae Hollingsway
- Paul Douglas as Porter Hollingsway
- Ann Sothern as Rita Phipps
- Kirk Douglas as George Phipps
- Barbara Lawrence as Georgiana "Babe" Finney, Lora Mae's sister
- Connie Gilchrist as Mrs. Ruby Finney
- Florence Bates as Mrs. Manleigh
- Hobart Cavanaugh as Mr. Manleigh
- Thelma Ritter as Sadie Dubin (uncredited)
- Celeste Holm as Addie Ross (uncredited voice)

== Production ==
=== Development ===
The film originated from the 1946 novel titled A Letter to Five Wives by John Klempner, which was first published in the August 1945 issue of Cosmopolitan magazine. In February 1946, 20th Century-Fox acquired the film rights to Klempner's novel. Melville Baker and Dorothy Bennett wrote the first treatments of the script. Although he was not credited for the final film, Baker offered the idea for the character of Addie to be heard but not seen. In October 1946, F. Hugh Herbert was assigned to write the screen adaptation. Samuel G. Engel was selected to produce the film while Maureen O'Hara, Linda Darnell, and Gene Tierney were considered for the primary roles. However, by June 1947, Sol C. Siegel took over as producer.

Vera Caspary came on board to write a new adaptation, in which she removed one of the wives and made the character Addie an unseen narrator. Retitled A Letter to Four Wives, Ernst Lubitsch was envisioned to direct the film, but he was in ill health. Siegel instead turned to Joseph L. Mankiewicz. In an interview with Life magazine, Mankiewicz stated he had read Caspary's script and knew he "had looked upon the Promised Land." By June 1947, Mankiewicz's involvement with the project was confirmed. While drafting a new script, Mankiewicz had intended for the fourth wife to be the granddaughter of the state's governor, but he told the Los Angeles Times that "we never got around to her." Mankiewicz turned in his draft to Darryl F. Zanuck, who then wrote back to Siegel stating his script was "magnificent, one of the best scripts of its type I had ever read." Nevertheless, Zanuck recommended he remove one of the wives, which Mankiewicz recalled was an "almost bloodless operation." By June 1948, the project was listed at the top of 20th Century-Fox's films to be produced over the following ten months.

=== Casting ===
Even before a script was finished, Gene Tierney, Linda Darnell, Maureen O'Hara, Dorothy McGuire, and Alice Faye were cast in the proposed A Letter to Five Wives by November 1946. To reduce the number of roles, Tierney's part was removed from the script.

By May 1948, Anne Baxter, Crain, Darnell and Sothern were set to play the title roles, and Macdonald Carey campaigned for a secondary role. Baxter's part was eliminated when Mankiewicz and Zanuck reduced the number of wives to three. Joan Crawford, Ida Lupino and Tallulah Bankhead had desired to play the unbilled voice role of Addie, but Celeste Holm was cast instead.

=== Filming ===
Production began in early June 1948.

The scenes on the riverboat were filmed on the Hudson River in Cold Spring, New York, and the children were underprivileged students from the Paulist School in New York's Hell's Kitchen neighborhood who were each paid $15 per day. Other area filming locations included Lake Mahopac, Stamford, Connecticut and Hook Mountain State Park.

Darnell and Sothern were reported to have feuded on set.

== Release ==
In December 1948, A Letter to Three Wives was previewed for film critics, including the National Legion of Decency, which classified the film as A-III (for adults only).

The film premiered at Radio City Music Hall in New York on January 20, 1949.

== Reception ==
=== Ending ===
The scene in which Porter reveals to Deborah that it was he who had run away with Addie has been the source of considerable confusion. Many audiences have interpreted Porter's admission as a magnanimous lie. George's next line, "Porter, you're quite a guy", and Rita's "She'd have known in the morning anyway" may suggest that Porter's false admission was a gallant act to spare Deborah from enduring an impossible night before she learns the hard truth the next day. Director Joseph Mankiewicz's son Christopher, who had also initially understood the admission as a lie, relates in the film's Blu-ray commentary track that General Douglas MacArthur was so confused about the ending that he phoned his father for clarification. For the rest of his life, whenever asked, Mankiewicz asserted that Porter's admission was meant to be true, and he could not understand why audiences would have arrived at any other interpretation.

=== Critical reception ===
Bosley Crowther of The New York Times wrote:

[I]n the reflections of these ladies, Mr. Mankiewicz cleverly evolves an interesting cross-sectioned picture of the small-town younger-married set. And as writer as well as director, he has capably brought forth a film which has humor, scepticism [sic], satire and gratifying romance. The fact that so many paces are put on display in this film forewarns that a certain unevenness is likely to occur. And it must be admitted frankly that the whole thing is not in perfect time. The earlier phases are draggy and just a bit obvious. ... But the final romantic remembrance—that of the hard-boiled wife—is a taut and explosive piece of satire, as funny and as poignant as it is shrewd. ... It wouldn't be fair to tell you whose husband it is that runs away. But the outcome is thoroughly satisfactory—and so is the film—by us.

Variety praised Mankiewicz's screenplay as "nifty" and "replete with sharp dialog" and the three female leads, writing each of them turned "in a job as good as anything they've done in [pictures] to date, with Miss Darnell in particular showing hitherto unrevealed thesping talents." Harrison's Reports wrote: "A combination of good writing, expert direction, and capable acting, [A Letter to Three Wives] shapes up as a very good comedy-drama, with an original story idea that has been given a deft flashback treatment." Time magazine called the film "a bright, unusual comedy that sets itself some high hurdles and clears them all—mostly with room to spare." Darnell was particularly highlighted as being "never shown so strikingly" in "a picture crowded with skilled performances—by Kirk Douglas, Miss Sothern, and Thelma Ritter as an aggressively democratic maid-of-all-work—Paul Douglas' spaniel-faced portrait of a tough guy stands by itself."

A review in the Chicago Tribune wrote: "Here's a picture that actually deserves some of the adjectives so often lavished on Hollywood products. It's smart, cute and funny—well-rounded entertainment of a sort that's all too rare these days. ... The conclusion is a clever mixture of humor and pathos—and the film so expert that you hate to see it end." Edwin Schallert of the Los Angeles Times wrote: "Its ultimate message is to put trust in your husband, though it never states this with any bald emphasis [...] The picture is likely to score a noteworthy hit especially with the feminine audience."

The February 2020 issue of New York Magazine named A Letter to Three Wives as among "The Best Movies That Lost Best Picture at the Oscars." On Rotten Tomatoes, 100% of 20 critics gave the film a positive review.

== Adaptations ==
In 1967, a Tamil adaptation, Bama Vijayam was made in India by filmmaker K. Balachander. Later the Tamil film was remade into several Indian languages including Telugu as Bhale Kodallu in 1968, in Hindi as Teen Bahuraniyan in 1968, in Malayalam as Sreekrishnapurathe Nakshathrathilakkam in 1998 and in Kannada as Swalpa Adjust Madkolli in 2000. On December 15, 1985, a television remake of the same title aired on NBC, featuring Loni Anderson as Lora Mae, Michele Lee as Rita, Stephanie Zimbalist as Debra, Charles Frank as Brad, Michael Gross as George and Ben Gazzara as Porter, with Ann Sothern appearing in a small role.

== In popular culture ==
The 21st-season episode of The Simpsons titled "Moe Letter Blues" parodied the plot of A Letter to Three Wives.

== Bibliography ==
- Stern, Sydney Ladensohn (2019). The Brothers Mankiewicz: Hope, Heartbreak, and Hollywood Classics. Jackson: University Press of Mississippi. ISBN 978-1-617-03267-7.
