= Thangai =

- Poster
- Directed by: A. C. Tirulokchandar
- Written by: Aaroor Dass (dialogues)
- Screenplay by: A. C. Tirulokchandar
- Produced by: Balaji
- Starring: Sivaji Ganesan; K. R. Vijaya
- Cinematography: T. Muthusamy
- Edited by: B. Kanthasamy
- Music by: M. S. Viswanathan
- Production company: Sujatha Cine Arts
- Release date: 19 May 1967
- Running time: 159 minutes
- Country: India
- Language: Tamil

Thangai (transl. Younger Sister) is a 1967 Indian Tamil-language action film, directed by A. C. Tirulokchandar, and produced by Balaji. The film stars Sivaji Ganesan and K. R. Vijaya, Kanchana, with K. Balaji, Nagesh in supporting roles. It was released on 19 May 1967. The film was remade in Telugu as Chelleli Kosam in 1968.

== Cast ==
- Sivaji Ganesan as Madhanagopal "Madhan"
- K. R. Vijaya as Dr. Leela
- Kanchana as Lalitha
- K. Balaji as Police Inspector Sridhar
- Major Sundarrajan as Ulaganathan
- S. V. Ramadas as Bhagathoor
- Nagesh as Vittal
- Harikrishnan as Harikrishnan
- Typist Gopu as Blade Periyasamy
- Master Sridhar as Young Madhan
- Baby Kowsalya as Vadivu
- Baby Nalini as Meri
- R. V. Udaiyappan as Sudhadi Chokkalingam Chettiyar
- Pakoda Kadhar as Somu
- Mysore Sudharsan as Professional Killer
- Kundu Dhandapani as Card Game Rowdy

== Production ==
Thangai was Sivaji Ganesan's first film under A. C. Tirulokchandar's direction. He was initially reluctant to accept the film due it being in the action genre and he was then known mainly for his dramatic films, but after producer Balaji assured him it would reinvent his image, he relented. The dialogues were written by Aaroor Dass.

== Soundtrack ==
The music was composed by M. S. Viswanathan, with lyrics by Kannadasan. When Viswanathan composed five tunes, Tirulokchandar and Balaji liked all the tunes; however they were challenged to choose only one tune for which they called a postman asking him to choose a tune which eventually became "Kettavarellam Paadalam".

Track listing
No.	Title	Singer(s)	Length
1.	"Kettavarellaam Paadalaam"	T. M. Soundararajan	5:07
2.	"Sugam Sugam Adhu"	P. Susheela	3:09
3.	"Thannirile Thamaraippoo"	T. M. Soundararajan	4:03
4.	"Thannirile Thamaraippoo" (pathos)	T. M. Soundararajan	2:13
5.	"Iniyadhu Iniyadhu Ulagam"	T. M. Soundararajan	3:29
6.	"Thathi Thathi"	L. R. Eswari	3:52
7.	"Ninaithen Ennai"	L. R. Eswari	3:59
Total length:			25:52

== Reception ==
Kalki appreciated the film for showcasing Ganesan in a new kind of role.
