= Nalla Neram =

1972 film by M. A. Thirumugam

- Poster
- Directed by: M. A. Thirumugam
- Written by: R. K. Shanmugam (dialogues)
- Story by: Sandow M. M. A. Chinnappa Thevar
- Based on: Haathi Mere Saathi by Salim–Javed
- Produced by: Sandow M. M. A. Chinnappa Thevar
- Starring: M. G. Ramachandran; K. R. Vijaya
- Cinematography: T. M. Sundar Babu; V. Selvaraj
- Edited by: M. A. Thirumugam; M. G. Balu Rao
- Music by: K. V. Mahadevan
- Production company: Devar Films
- Release date: 10 March 1972
- Running time: 162 minutes
- Country: India
- Language: Tamil

Nalla Neram (transl. Good Time) is a 1972 Indian Tamil-language film, directed by M. A. Thirumugam and produced by Sandow M. M. A. Chinnappa Thevar. The film stars M. G. Ramachandran and K. R. Vijaya. It is a remake of the 1967 Tamil film Deiva Cheyal. All three versions were produced by Thevar. The film was released on 10 March 1972. It emerged a major success, running for more than 100 days in theatres.

== Plot ==
Raja Kumar, affectionately known as Raju (played by M.G. Ramachandran), is a compassionate and courageous man who earns his living by training and performing with elephants. Raised among these majestic animals, Raju shares an unbreakable bond with them—especially with his lead elephant, who is more like a brother than a beast. His life is simple yet noble, rooted in loyalty, discipline, and a deep respect for nature.

Raju’s world changes when he meets Vijaya (played by K.R. Vijaya), a gentle and educated woman from a different social background. Their love blossoms quickly, and despite their contrasting lifestyles, they marry and begin a new life together. However, Vijaya harbors a traumatic past—she lost her younger brother in a tragic elephant-related accident during childhood. This unresolved fear turns into resentment, and she finds it difficult to accept Raju’s close relationship with the elephants.

As Raju continues his work, Vijaya feels increasingly isolated and neglected. She believes Raju prioritizes his elephants over her emotional needs, leading to tension and heartbreak. The conflict escalates when Vijaya demands that Raju abandon his profession and sever ties with the elephants. Torn between his wife’s pain and his lifelong companions, Raju faces a moral and emotional dilemma.

The situation worsens when Raju is falsely accused of negligence during a public performance, resulting in a temporary ban from his profession. Vijaya sees this as a divine sign and urges him to start anew, away from the elephants. But Raju’s conscience and loyalty won’t allow him to betray the animals who stood by him through thick and thin.

In a dramatic turn, Vijaya’s life is endangered during a forest trip, and it is Raju’s elephant who saves her. This act of bravery forces Vijaya to confront her fears and recognize the purity and loyalty of the animals she once hated. She realizes that Raju’s love for the elephants is not a threat to their marriage but a reflection of his noble character.

The film concludes with reconciliation and emotional healing. Vijaya embraces Raju’s world, and together they build a life that honors both human and animal bonds. Nalla Neram ends on a triumphant note, celebrating love, loyalty, and the timeless connection between man and nature.

== Cast ==
Actor	Role
M. G. Ramachandran	Raja "Raju" Kumar, a businessman
S. A. Ashokan	Dharmalingham, Vijaya's father
Major Sundarrajan	Velu, the trainer of animals
Thengai Srinivasan	Raju's accountant
S.V.Ramadass	Raju's father
V. Gopalakrishnan	Paramasivan, the ex-famous acrobat-The human torch
Justin	Hired man of Velu
"Sandow" M.M.A.Chinnappa Devar	Ranga, a fairground entertainer and Velu's henchman
Nagesh	Murugan, a fairground entertainer and Raju's friend
K. R. Vijaya	Viji alias Vijaya, Raju's wife
Sachu	Valli, Murugan's lover
Radhiga ("Magic" Radhika)	Velu's cabaret female dancer
"Kovalai" Kamatchi	
Master Raju Kumar	Raju, child

== Production ==
Nalla Neram is a remake of the 1971 Hindi film Haathi Mera Saathi, which in turn was adapted from Chinnappa Thevar's own Tamil film Deiva Cheyal (1967) which flopped. This film was the sixteenth and final collaboration between Ramachandran and Thevar. For the song "Aagattumda Thambi", Ramachandran drove a '58 Chevrolet Impala.

== Soundtrack ==
The music was composed by K. V. Mahadevan.

Song	Singers	Lyrics	Length
"Agattumda Thambi"	T. M. Soundararajan	Avinashi Mani	03:05
"Nee Thottal"	T. M. Soundararajan, P. Susheela	Kannadasan	03:22
"Odi Odi Uzhaikkum"	T. M. Soundararajan	Pulamaipithan	03:11
"Tick Tick"	T. M. Soundararajan, P. Susheela	Kannadasan	03:12
Dance Music	Instrumental	-	02:19
