= Deiva Cheyal =

1967 film by M. G. Balu

- Poster
- Directed by: M. G. Balu
- Story by: Sandow M. M. A. Chinnappa Thevar
- Produced by: Sandow M. M. A. Chinnappa Thevar
- Starring: Major Sundarrajan; R. Muthuraman; Bharathi Vishnuvardhan
- Music by: Diwakar
- Production company: Dhandayuthapani Films
- Release date: 23 June 1967
- Country: India
- Language: Tamil

Deiva Cheyal (transl. Divine Act) is a 1967 Indian Tamil-language drama film directed by M. G. Balu and produced by Sandow M. M. A. Chinnappa Thevar, who also wrote the story. The film stars Major Sundarrajan, R. Muthuraman and Bharathi Vishnuvardhan. Although not a commercial success, it was adapted into the Hindi film Haathi Mere Saathi (1971), and it was later remade in Tamil as Nalla Neram (1972), both of which achieved commercial success. All three versions were produced by Sandow M. M. A. Chinnappa Thevar.

== Plot ==
It tells the story of Major who runs a circus and is as close to the animal as he is to his own son played by Muthuraman. Fate plays havoc in form of Major's creditors, his own daughter-in-law and through her, his son; thereby testing the relationship between himself and his animals. He moves out at one point in time with the animals. He rebuilds his life, with the help of his animals and regains the trust of his son and daughter-in-law.

== Cast ==
- Major Sundarrajan
- R. Muthuraman
- Bharathi Vishnuvardhan
- S. V. Ramadas
- Bharathi Rao

== Production ==
Deiva Cheyal was produced by Sandow M. M. A. Chinnappa Thevar under Dhandayuthapani Films, and directed by M. G. Balu. Thevar also wrote the story, while Ayyapillai wrote the dialogue. Major Sundarrajan, R. Muthuraman and Bharathi Vishnuvardhan starred. All the animals in the film had been trained to respond to commands in Hindi; since Sundarrajan could speak the language, this worked to his advantage. Animals used included elephants, lions and rhinoceros. The film's animal trainer told Sundarrajan that the lion would stay calm if he kept scratching its mane, when he sat astride it, and Sundarrajan did accordingly. The music was composed by Diwakar, and the final cut measured 3,997 metres (13,114 ft).

== Release and reception ==
Deiva Cheyal was released on 23 June 1967. Kalki said the animal actors performed better than the human actors. The film was not commercially successful, but Sundarrajan's performance was praised.

== Adaptations ==
Although Deiva Cheyal was not a commercial success, Thevar adapted it in Hindi as Haathi Mere Saathi (1971), starring Rajesh Khanna. This version, the script of which was tweaked by Salim–Javed, emerged a major success, and was adapted in Tamil, again with some changes, as the M. G. Ramachandran starrer Nalla Neram (1972), which was also a success. However, Thevar later opined that "the performance of both MGR and Rajesh Khanna was only 50%" of Sundarrajan's.
