= Padagotti =

1964 film by T. Prakash Rao

- Theatrical release poster
- Directed by: T. Prakash Rao
- Screenplay by: Sakthi T. K. Krishnasamy
- Story by: Nannu
- Produced by: G. N. Velumani
- Starring: M. G. Ramachandran; B. Saroja Devi
- Cinematography: P. L. Roy
- Edited by: C. P. Jambulingam
- Music by: Viswanathan–Ramamoorthy
- Production company: Saravana Films
- Release date: 3 November 1964
- Country: India
- Language: Tamil

Padagotti (transl. Coxswain) is a 1964 Indian Tamil-language social problem film directed by T. Prakash Rao and produced by G. N. Velumani. The film stars M. G. Ramachandran and B. Saroja Devi, with M. N. Nambiar, S. V. Ramadas, Nagesh, Manorama and Jayanthi in supporting roles. It depicts the enmity between two fishing communities in a village, which is fuelled by the village's zamindar, who stands to gain the most from it all.

Padagotti's screenplay was written by Sakthi T. K. Krishnasamy, based on a story by Nannu, and cinematography was handled by P. L. Roy, while editing was handled by C. P. Jambulingam. The film was shot predominantly on locations near the seashore, including Alappuzha, Kerala. It was released on 3 November 1964, coinciding with the festival of Diwali. Despite facing competition from other films released on the same day, Padagotti became a commercial success, with a theatrical run of over 100 days.

== Plot ==
Manickam is the leader of a fishing community named Thirukaai Meenavargal (turbot fisherman). In the same area lives Alaiyappan, the leader of the opposing fishing community Sura Meenavargal (shark fishermen). While Manickam is honest, compassionate and principled, Alaiyappan is the opposite, driven mainly by greed. Manickam's father wishes to see the enmity between the two groups end, and he persuades them to be friends. The Sura Meenavargal refuse, and beat him to death. Manickam promises to fulfill his father's wish, and works hard to end the enmity. The person responsible for fuelling this enmity is the village zamindar Neelamagam, who stands to gain the most from it all. Alaiyappan's blind allegiance is to Neelamagam.

Manickam falls in love with Alaiyappan's daughter Muthazhagi, and she reciprocates. However, their romance is disapproved of by their communities. When Manickam goes to Sura Meenavargal to seek peace, he is beaten to his apparent death. Because of this, his men nearly kill Alaiyappan, who is then saved by a mysterious old man. Thankful to the old man, Alaiyappan allows him to stay for the night at his home. Muthazhagi later realises the old man is actually Manickam in disguise, but conceals it from everyone. Even when there is a boat race between the two communities, the disguised Manickam chooses to go with Sura Meenavargal, and they win. However, his cover is blown soon after, and an enraged Alaiyappan forces him to leave Muthazhagi.

Neelamagam wants to marry Muthazhagi, and Alaiyappan reluctantly agrees due to lack of funds, but Muthazhagi is unwilling. She is kept at Neelamagam's mansion and is unable to escape, as even Manickam (in a new disguise) fails to save her. Neelamagam's wife Meenvizhi secretly helps Muthazhagi out of the mansion. For doing so, she is killed by Neelamagam. He begins to chase Muthazhagi, but is cornered by Manickam and a fight ensues between the duo. Shortly after, the local police arrive and arrest Neelamagam for murdering his wife. With both the communities reconciling, Alaiyappan agrees for Muthazhagi and Manickam to be married.

== Cast ==
- M. G. Ramachandran as Manickam
- B. Saroja Devi as Muthazhagi
- M. N. Nambiar as Neelamagam
- S. V. Ramadas as Alaiyappan
- Nagesh as Ponvandu
- Manorama as Pavalam
- Jayanthi as Meenvizhi

== Production ==
Padagotti was directed by T. Prakash Rao, and produced by G. N. Velumani under the banner of Saravana Films. It was the company's first colour film, being colourised through Eastmancolor. The screenplay was written by Sakthi T. K. Krishnasamy, based on an original story by Nannu, and cinematography was handled by P. L. Roy, while C. P. Jambulingam was chosen as editor. While M. G. Ramachandran and B. Saroja Devi were cast as the lead pair, Nagesh was cast as Ponvandu, a comical character who beats people whenever a gramophone plays a certain music. This subplot was adapted from an episode of The Three Stooges. Most of the film was shot on actual locations near the seashore, including Alappuzha, Kerala. It was poet Vaali who chose the title Padagotti for this film.

== Themes ==
Padagotti is a social problem film that deals with groupism among fishermen, the problems of fishermen in general, and moneylenders bleeding the poor. Tamil Canadian journalist D. B. S. Jeyaraj wrote that Ramachandran portrayed different roles in his films "so that different segments of the population could relate to and identify with him", citing his role of a coxswain in Padagotti, an agriculturist in Vivasayi (1967), and a rickshaw puller in Rickshawkaran (1971) as examples. S. Rajanayagam, author of the book Popular Cinema and Politics in South India: The Films of MGR and Rajinikanth, felt the title Padagotti, like the titles of many other Ramachandran films, was "sober, occupation-oriented and positive".

== Soundtrack ==
The soundtrack was composed by the duo of Viswanathan–Ramamoorthy, while the lyrics were written by Vaali. The song "Thottal Poo Malarum" is set in the Carnatic raga known as Suddhadhanyasi, and according to singer Charulatha Mani, this song "changed the outlook of this raga in films". It was later re-tuned by A. R. Rahman for the 2004 film New. The song "Tharaimel Pirakka" was composed in Bilaskhani Todi, a Hindustani raga. The song "Koduthadellam Koduthan" was originally written by Vaali for Paadhai Theriyudhu Paar (1960) which was rejected by the director of that film and later it was used in this film. Velumani felt the song "nicely captured MGR's characteristics" through the lyrics "Koduthadellam koduthan, Avan yaarukaaga koduthaan, Orutharukka koduthaan illai oorukaaga koduthaan" which translate to "He gave all that he gave, to whom did he give? Did he give for just one? No, he gave for everyone". The song "Naanoru Kuzhandhai" is based on Desh raga.

"Thottal Poo Malarum" was included by The Hindu in their list Best of Vaali: From 1964–2013.

Track listing
No.	Title	Singer(s)	Length
1.	"Azhagu Oru Ragam"	P. Susheela
2.	"Ennai Eduthu"	P. Susheela
3.	"Kalyana Ponnu"	T. M. Soundararajan
4.	"Koduthellam Koduthaan"	T. M. Soundararajan
5.	"Naan Oru Kuzhandhai"	T. M. Soundararajan
6.	"Paattukku Patteduthu"	T. M. Soundararajan, P. Susheela
7.	"Tharaimel Pirakka"	T. M. Soundararajan
8.	"Thottal Poo Malarum"	T. M. Soundararajan, P. Susheela

== Release and reception ==
Padagotti was released on 3 November 1964, during that year's Diwali. Despite facing competition from other Diwali releases such as Navarathri and Muradan Muthu, it became commercially successful, running for over 100 days in theatres. The Indian Express wrote on 14 November 1964, "A bright piece of acting by Ramadas and P. L. Rai's excellent outdoor photography which bares the bountiful beauty of the backwaters of Kerala are the only two redeeming features of the film. But they are as much a consolation as having enjoyed the cool breeze during a day-long futile angling." Writing for Kalki, N. Ramakrishna gave the film a mixed review, calling the photography one of its few redeeming features.

== Bibliography ==
- Jagathrakshakan, S. (1984). Dr. M.G.R., a Phenomenon. Apollo Veliyeetagam. OCLC 568936093.
- Kannan, R. (2017). MGR: A Life. India: Penguin Random House. ISBN 978-0-14-342934-0.
- Rajadhyaksha, Ashish; Willemen, Paul (1998) [1994]. Encyclopaedia of Indian Cinema. British Film Institute and Oxford University Press. ISBN 0-19-563579-5.
- Rajanayagam, S. (2015). Popular Cinema and Politics in South India: The Films of MGR and Rajinikanth. Routledge. ISBN 978-1-138-82203-0.
