= Bama Vijayam (1967 film) =

1967 Indian film by K. Balachander

- Theatrical release poster
- Directed by: K. Balachander
- Written by: K. Balachander
- Produced by: M. S. Kasi
- Starring: Sowcar Janaki; Rajasree; Kanchana; Jayanthi; Sachu; R. Muthuraman; Nagesh; Major Sundarrajan; Srikanth; T. S. Balaiah
- Cinematography: P. N. Sundaram
- Edited by: N. R. Kittu
- Music by: M. S. Viswanathan
- Production company: Manohar Pictures
- Distributed by: Gemini Studios
- Release date: 24 February 1967
- Running time: 179 minutes
- Country: India
- Language: Tamil

Bama Vijayam (/bɑːmɑː vidʒəjəm/ transl. Bama's visit) is a 1967 Indian Tamil-language comedy film directed by K. Balachander. The film features an ensemble cast including Sowcar Janaki, Rajasree, Kanchana, Jayanthi, Sachu, R. Muthuraman, Nagesh, Major Sundarrajan, Srikanth and T. S. Balaiah. It revolves around a man's three daughters-in-law who go to absurd lengths to impress an actress who becomes their neighbour.

Bama Vijayam was simultaneously filmed in Telugu as Bhale Kodallu with a slightly different cast. It was released on 24 February 1967, and won the Tamil Nadu State Film Award for Third Best Film. The film was later remade in Hindi as Teen Bahuraniyan (1968), with Janaki, Kanchana and Jayanthi reprising their roles. In 1998, it was remade into Malayalam as Sreekrishnapurathe Nakshathrathilakkam. It was also remade in Kannada as Swalpa Adjust Madkolli (2000).

== Plot ==
- A middle-class joint family is living happily led by the responsible father Ethiraj, a retired headmaster. He has three sons – Maheshwaran, Raman, and Krishnan. Maheswaran is a Hindi professor; he and his wife Parvathi have five children. Raman, a high court clerk, has two children with wife Sita. Krishnan, a medical representative, is married to Rukmini. Sumathi, the younger sister of Sita also stays in the same house, as she is pursuing higher studies in the same city. Though it is a joint family, the father has set up his three sons in three different portions in the same house, and takes turns to eat in each of his son's house, to avoid any possibility of problems between them. The sons give their salaries to their father, and all the financial matters are dealt by him efficiently. He is respected and feared by everyone in the family. Wrong-doers in the household are made to stand on a bench by him as punishment.
- Meanwhile, a popular actress Bama moves into the bungalow next to their house. The three daughters-in-law and the sons meet her while they are all in the terrace, and try to make friends with her. Bama is very polite, and accepts their invitation to come to their house on 16th of that month. Now, the three ladies in the house start making fuss about the condition of their house, saying that they do not have enough facilities in their house to show to Bama that there are well-off. The husbands try to convince them but they force their husbands to agree to whatever they ask. Eventually the men give in and start buying things for their own houses. They paint the house, get stuff like radio, fan, sofa, for their own portions.
- In order to spy on actress Bama, Parvathy, Seetha and Rukmani send Seetha's younger sister Sumathi to actress Bama's house as a maid.
- After that, when actress Bama told her that Sumathi, who was going to work for her, had no work at the moment, Bama's assistant manager Suresh was immediately captivated by Sumathi's beauty and told actress Bama that, if she was looking for someone as body-pain-reliever body-massager after the shooting, now she has found someone. When asked how that was, Sumathi said that she was har own masseuse and Bama agreed to work as a body-massager for her. Moreover, instead of spying on Sumathi, Bama fell in love with manager Suresh Sumathi on the pretext of working Massager her
- The father tries in vain to make everyone understand that they should live for themselves within their means. They get all the things for the house – a few for rent, a few for instalment, and also borrow money with a high interest rate. They even go to the extent of hiring a male servant to stay in the house. The ladies start arguing whose portion should Bama visit first when she comes to their house. Finally, Parvathi makes the other two ladies agree by showing a diamond necklace that she borrowed from her friend. They decide to pass the necklace through the windows so that Bama would think that everyone has diamond necklaces.
- On the day of Bama's visit, Parvathi decides to lock three of her five children inside a room, so that Bama would not know that she is old enough to have 5 kids. Sita sees this, and she decides to hide her spectacles, so that Bama would not guess her age too. When Bama arrives, she goes to Sita's portion first. Sita has to go and get the diamond necklace from Parvathi. Meanwhile, Raman tells Bama about his and his brothers' jobs. When Sita comes, she lies to Bama that Raman is an advocate in high court, to which both Bama and Raman look surprised. Bama asks Sita what the time is, but Sita cannot see the time in her wrist watch without the spectacles. Parvathi sees this and laughs.
- Later when Bama goes to Parvathi's portion, Parvathi lies that her husband is college principal. When she tells that she has only two children, Sita lets the other three kids out of the locked room. Bama thinks that the kids are orphans, and Parvathi, who does not know English, agrees that the kids are orphans. Sita makes fun of this. Finally, when Bama arrives at Krishnan's part of the house, she gets a spectacular welcome with red carpet, flowers and her favourite drinks. They even take a few snaps with her.
- The ladies are amazed by Bama's simplicity like glass bangles, her politeness. Even then they do not take a cue, and try to show off too much in front of her. Soon, they get close to Bama and keep meeting her for picnics in her shooting spots, etc., neglecting their family. Krishnan gets an instalment car for the ladies to roam, Raman gets telephone connection through' his office citing his father's "illness", which the ladies use to talk to Bama every day.
- After a few months of this, and financial problems, a bombshell appears in the form of an anonymous letter stating that one of the three husbands is having an affair with Bama, and this upsets their wives. Each hopes and wishes that her husband is not the culprit, but to each the evidence seems to point to him only.
- After a series of humorous incidents, the false news of Maheshwaran having illegal contact with Bama is published in a newspaper, thus leading to more trouble. However, after some time, the publisher apologises for it and decides to publish a retraction, and it all ends well for everyone.
- One day, Bama suffered from severe hip pain after being attacked by actor Shankar during a shoot. To relieve her hip pain, she asked her bodyguard Sumathi to give her some oil. Sumathi reluctantly agreed and applied the oil on Bama's hips. While Suresh and Sumathi were exchanging their love language through gestures, Sumathi, driven by love and a little anger, suddenly gave Bama a quick punch on the hip.
- Seeing this, the actress Bama realized that she loved Suresh in Sumathi's heart and came forward to marry her legally.

== Cast ==
- Sowcar Janaki as Parvathi
- Rajasree as Bama
- Kanchana as Seetha
- Jayanthi as Rukmani
- Sachu as Sumathi "Massager Sumathi"
- S. N. Lakshmi as Alamel
- S. N. Parvathy as Parvathi's mother
- R. Muthuraman as Raman
- Nagesh as Krishna
- Major Sundarrajan as Maheswaran
- Srikanth as Suresh
- T. S. Balaiah as Ethiraj
- Samikannu as Seetha and Sumathi's father
- P. D. Sambandam as Radha's father

== Production ==
In 1965, when K. Balachander was a rookie in the film industry, his household was excited because Sowcar Janaki, an established actress, was due to visit their house. This incident laid the foundation for Bama Vijayam, which was written and directed by Balachander, and produced by M. S. Kasi under Manohar Pictures. It was simultaneously filmed in Telugu as Bhale Kodallu, with a slightly different cast.

== Themes ==
Bama Vijayam, a satire, focuses on how "false prestige, pretence and living beyond one's means" can destroy a household. Historian Randor Guy and News18 noted the film's similarities to A Letter to Three Wives (1949). According to Aranthai Manian, the film has similarities with the stage play Star Night by K. K. Raman.

== Soundtrack ==
The soundtrack was composed by M. S. Viswanathan, with lyrics by Kannadasan. The song "Varavu Ettanna Selavu Pathanna" (transl. Income is eight annas and expense is ten annas) attained popularity. The Times of India said it "makes you laugh just as much as it makes you think!"

| Song | Singer | Duration |
|---|---|---|
| "Ninaithaal Sirippuvarum" | P. Susheela, L. R. Eswari | 4:45 |
| "Aani Muthu" | P. Susheela, Soolamangalam Rajalakshmi, L. R. Eswari | 3:03 |
| "Kuru Kuru Nagaienna" | T. M. Soundararajan, L. R. Eswari | 3:01 |
| "Varavu Ettanna Selavu Pathanna" | T. M. Soundararajan, L. R. Eswari | 5:35 |

== Release and reception ==
Bama Vijayam was released on 24 February 1967, and distributed by Gemini Studios. Kalki lauded the film for the cast performances and Balachander's direction. The film won the Chennai Film Fans' Association Award for Best Film, and the Tamil Nadu State Film Award for Third Best Film.

== Other versions ==
Bama Vijayam was remade in Hindi as Teen Bahuraniyan in 1968, with Sowcar Janaki, Kanchana and Jayanthi reprising their roles. The film was remade into Malayalam as Sreekrishnapurathe Nakshathrathilakkam (1998) with a slightly different storyline. The film was unofficially remade in Kannada as Swalpa Adjust Madkolli (2000). A theatrical adaptation of Bama Vijayam, titled Mastani O Mastani, was staged by Rajan Radhakrishnan in November 2017.

== Legacy ==
In an interview with The Hindu, Crazy Mohan said that "no attempt at comedy could ever match Bama Vijayam". Film historian Mohan Raman wrote that Balaiah "[excelled] as the concerned head of the family".

== Bibliography ==
- Ashokamitran (2016). Fourteen Years with Boss. Penguin Books. ISBN 978-0-14-342329-4.
- Rajadhyaksha, Ashish; Willemen, Paul (1998) [1994]. Encyclopaedia of Indian Cinema. British Film Institute and Oxford University Press. ISBN 0-19-563579-5.
