= Aalukkoru Veedu =

1960 film directed by M. Krishnan

- Poster
- Directed by: M. Krishnan Nair
- Written by: Sakthi T. K. Krishnasamy
- Starring: Sathyan; L. Vijayalakshmi; T. S. Muthaiah; D. Balasubramaniam; Javar Seetharaman; Tambaram Lalitha; T. R. Ramachandran; S. D. Subbulakshmi
- Music by: Viswanathan–Ramamoorthy
- Production company: Subhash Movies
- Release date: 16 September 1960
- Country: India
- Language: Tamil

Aalukkoru Veedu (transl. A House Each) is a 1960 Indian Tamil-language film directed by M. Krishnan and produced by Subhash Movies. Written by Sakthi T. K. Krishnasamy, it stars Sathyan, T. S. Muthaiah, D. Balasubramaniam, L. Vijayalakshmi, Tambaram Lalitha, T. R. Ramachandran and S. D. Subbulakshmi.

== Plot ==
The story revolves around Thamizh, a humble, middle-class carpenter in a small village, whose dream is to build a home for his family. Despite his tireless efforts, Thamizh struggles with financial constraints and a web of societal expectations. His wife Kavitha, a schoolteacher, supports him unwaveringly, but her patience begins to wane as their dreams of a secure home feel increasingly distant.

One day, Thamizh receives an unusual offer from a wealthy businessman, Rajasekaran, who asks him to renovate a dilapidated ancestral mansion. Rajasekaran promises a generous reward but warns Thamizh that the project must remain a secret. Intrigued and desperate, Thamizh agrees.

As Thamizh begins work on the mansion, he discovers eerie elements hidden in its structure—letters, old photographs, and tools engraved with mysterious symbols. He learns that the mansion once belonged to a famed architect, Vedhanayagam, who designed homes not just as shelters but as expressions of human emotions. Vedhanayagam vanished mysteriously after his final project, leaving behind stories of betrayal and greed.

Simultaneously, Thamizh's bond with Kavitha strains as he spends more time at the mansion, and his young son, Arjun, begins to notice odd occurrences at home—dreams of a shadowy figure that seem connected to the mansion's secrets.

The second half takes an emotional and supernatural turn when Thamizh uncovers a diary belonging to Vedhanayagam. It narrates the architect’s obsession with creating homes for the deserving, only to be cheated by Rajasekaran’s ancestors. Haunted by guilt and vengeance, Vedhanayagam’s spirit lingers, waiting for justice.

Thamizh realizes the mansion's renovation is more than a project—it is a test of character. Guided by the diary, Thamizh faces moral dilemmas, grapples with family conflicts, and unravels the truth behind Rajasekaran's ulterior motives.

In a gripping climax, Thamizh uses his skills, the lessons from Vedhanayagam's diary, and his unwavering resolve to restore the mansion not just structurally but spiritually, ensuring it becomes a symbol of redemption and justice. Rajasekaran's greed is exposed, and the mansion is transformed into a shelter for the homeless, fulfilling Vedhanayagam's vision.

The film concludes with Thamizh returning home to his family, now confident that a veedu is not just a physical structure but a place where love, trust, and dreams reside.

== Production ==
Aalukkoru Veedu was written by playwright and screenwriter Sakthi T. K. Krishnasamy, produced by the studio Subhash Movies and directed by Malayalam director M. Krishnan. The dance sequences were choreographed by E. Madhavan, while A. Krishnan was the cinematographer. Shooting took place at Vijaya-Vauhini Studios.

== Soundtrack ==
The music was composed by the duo Viswanathan–Ramamoorthy. The song "Anbu Manam Kalantha Pinney Acchham Thevayaa", a duet between P. B. Sreenivas and P. Susheela, became a hit.

Song	Singer/s	Lyricist	Duration
"Seyyum Thozhile Deivam"	K. Jamuna Rani & Renuka	Pattukkottai Kalyanasundaram	03:17
"Pennille Nee Pennille"	A. L. Raghavan & K.Jamuna Rani	Pattukkottai Kalyanasundaram	03:23
"Urukellaam Ore Saami"	K. Jamuna Rani & L. R. Eswari	Pattukkottai Kalyanasundaram	02:25
"Thaayille Thandhaiyille"	K. Jamuna Rani	Pattukkottai Kalyanasundaram	
"Anbumanam Kanindhapinne"	P. B. Sreenivas & P. Susheela	Pattukkottai Kalyanasundaram	03:18
"Adiyaarku Adiyaaraayi"	K. Jamunarani & group	Pattukkottai Kalyanasundaram	
"Nee Kettadhu Inbam, Kidaithadhu.."	P. Leela	Pattukkottai Kalyanasundaram	03:25
"Kaiyile Valai Kulunga"	L. R. Eswari & Renuka	K. D. Santhanam	

== Reception ==
Aalukkoru Veedu was released on 16 September 1960. The film was praised for the performances of its cast, especially that of Sathyan, but was only modestly successful at the box office.
