= Sakthi T. K. Krishnasamy =

Indian writer

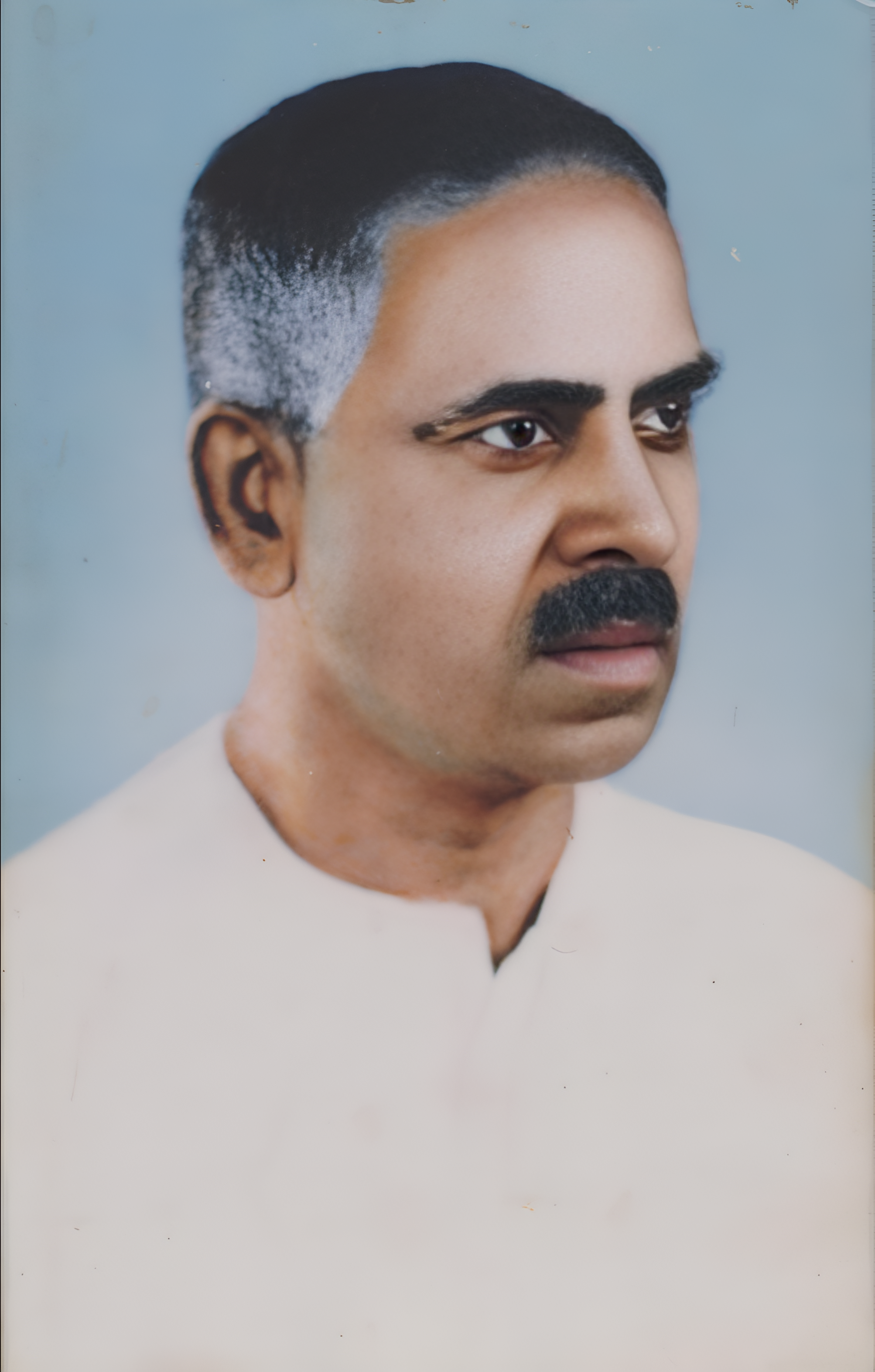
- Born: Thanjavur. Kaliyaperumal. Krishnasamy; 11 March 1913; Thanjavur, Madras Presidency, British India
- Died: 8 November 1987 (aged 74); Chennai, Tamil Nadu, India
- Occupations: Drama Troupe Owner, Dramas Author & Director, Screenplay and Dialogues Writer, Lyricist
- Years active: 1940s–1970s

Sakthi T. K. Krishnasamy (11 March 1913 – 8 November 1987) was a veteran author and director of Indian Tamil dramas, celebrated screenwriter and lyricist in Tamil films from the 1940s through the 1970s. His stories, screenplay and dialogues were written mostly for films starring M. G. Ramachandran and Sivaji Ganesan. He authored historical, mythological and social Tamil films spanning over three decades. He was considered a pioneer of early Tamil stage dramas, and one of the best and most acclaimed film script writers of Tamil cinema, being hailed as such by popular screenwriters and political leaders like C. N. Annadurai and M. Karunanidhi. His most acclaimed works are Veerapandiya Kattabomman and Karnan.

== Career ==
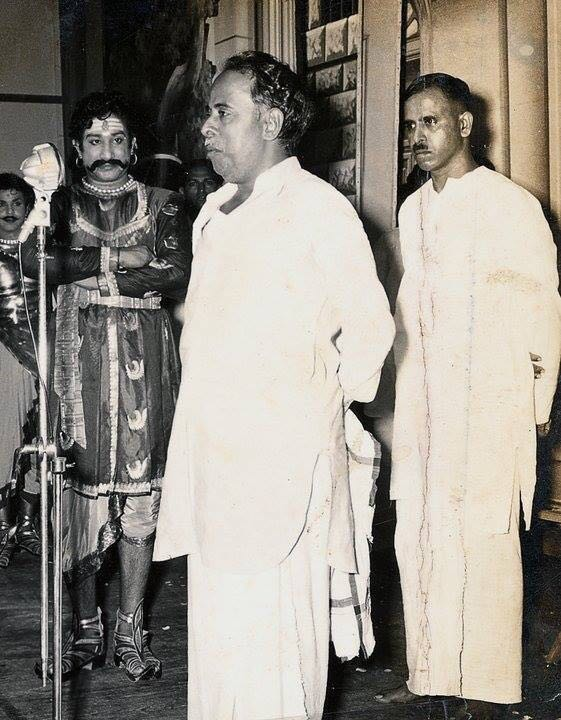
Sakthi TK Krishnasamy with the then Tamil Nadu CM C.N. Annadurai and Sivaji Ganesan

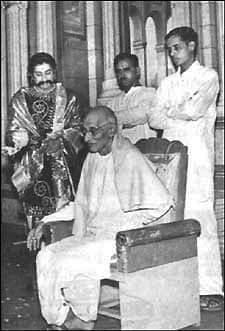
Sakthi Krishnasamy in one of his drama functions with leader Rajaji and Sivaji Ganesan

Sakthi Krishnasamy began his literary career as a playwright and ran his own drama troupe called "Sakthi Nataka Sabha" between the 1940s and 1950s. His first drama was staged at the Nagapattinam Baby Theatre and from then on he continued to write a wide variety of plays. Bhayankari was a James Bond–type thriller, Thozhan was about friendship and betrayal, while Vidhi was a love story. He was one of the earliest pioneers to have three different stages set up, and when the scene was over in one the action would shift to another stage by the side. He also wrote popular historical dramas such as Noorjehan, Chanakyan Sabatham and Maveeran Ceasar, which were staged many times to a full house. Another of his most popular plays was Kaviyin Kanavu. Sakthi's plays were so popular that the Railways ran "Sakthi" special trains from Trichy to Nagapattinam and Trichy to Kumbakonam when they were staged. Many artistes from his drama troupe such as Sivaji Ganesan, M. N. Nambiar, V. K. Ramasamy, S. V. Subbiah and A. P. Nagarajan went on to become popular actors in the Tamil film industry. The troupe consisted of about 60 members. Each member of the cast was required to learn the lines of all characters in a play, as they played different roles in different weeks. Though Sakthi himself trained the actors in acting and dialogue delivery skills, his troupe also employed professional dance masters, music teachers and fight masters to train the actors to be versatile in other skills. Sivaji Ganesan was cast as a villain in the play Vidhi. Upon observing his acting skills in that play, as a hero in another drama, and as the lady character lead in Noorjehan drama, Mr. Perumal Mudaliar told Sakthi that he has found the hero for the film Parasakthi and had him cast in that highly successful film. M. N. Nambiar, another prominent actor of the troupe, also made his breakthrough into films after one of his performances had impressed a producer.

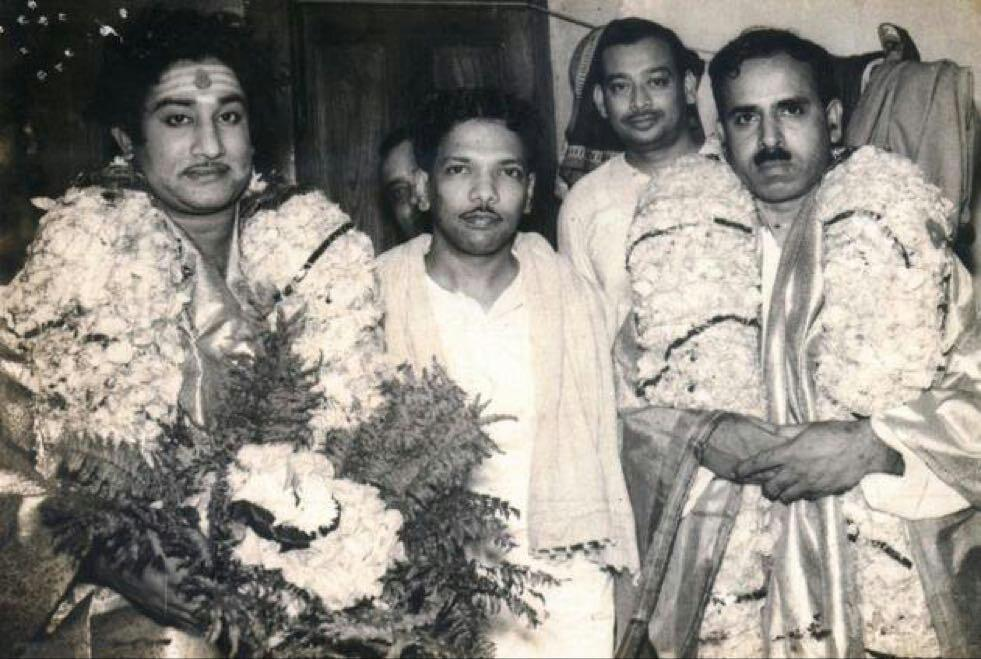
Sivaji Ganesan, Kalaingar Karunanidhi, Sakthi TK Krishnasamy (100th day film function)

Sakthi Krishnasamy first wrote Veerapandiya Kattabomman as a stage play in 1957. The play was staged throughout Tamil Nadu, and received critical acclaim and commercial success. Two years later it was made into a highly successful film, with Sivaji Ganesan in the lead and Sakthi Krishnasamy handling the script and dialogues. Sakthi Krishnasamy's powerful dialogues played a large part in its success. The film won awards in the second Afro-Asian Film Festival at Cairo (1960) for best acting and music, and also received a special jury award. Another epic Tamil film, Karnan, also written by Krishnasamy, was a classic blockbuster. In the Tamil movie industry his Veerapandiya Kattabomman film dialogues are still used as the auditioning test script for aspiring actors. Many of the other M.G.R and Sivaji Ganesan's films for which Sakthi Krishnasamy wrote the story, screenplay and dialogues, were box office hits.

Aside from writing screenplays for many popular Tamil films, he was also a lyricist for a number of movies in the 1960s.

He was a Gandhian, who was patron for more than 30 years of the Mahatma Gandhi Library in Saidapet, Chennai, for the economically weak, and helped it grow from 20 books to 20,000 books in his lifetime. 'Sakthi' also financially helped many low income families in his native Thanjavur district to conduct their daughters' wedding, some of which were presided by his best friend 'Kaviarasu' Kannadasan upon his request.

Sakthi T. K. Krishnasamy died after a brief illness on 8 November 1987.

== Partial filmography ==
- Velaikaran (1952)
- Ambikapathy (1957)
- Veerapandiya Kattabomman (1959)
- Thozhan (1960)
- Aalukkoru Veedu (1960)
- Sangilidevan (1960)
- Periya Idathu Penn (1963)
- Kunkhumam (1963)
- Karnan (1964)
- Panakkara Kudumbam (1964)
- Arunagirinathar (1964)
- Padagotti (1964)
- Panam Padaithavan (1965)
- Enga Veettu Pillai (1965)
- Nee! (1965)
- Parakkum Paavai (1966)
- Thanga Surangam (1969)
- Sorgam (1970)
- Dharmam Engey (1972)
- Ponnunjal (1973)
- Ennai Pol Oruvan (1978)
- Punniya Boomi (1978)

== Awards ==
- Kalaimamani Award from Tamil Nadu State Government
- Best Film Dialogues Writer - (Regional - Tamil) award given by the Government of India for the film Karnan
- Special jury award - given at Second Afro-Asian Film Festival at Cairo (1960) for Veerapandiya Kattabomman film

== Bibliography ==
- Anandan, Film News (2004). Sadhanaigal padaitha Tamil Thiraipada Varalaaru (A history of record making Tamil films) (in Tamil). Chennai: Sivagami Publications.
