= Parakkum Pavai =

1966 film by T. R. Ramanna

- Theatrical release poster
- Directed by: T. R. Ramanna
- Written by: Sakthi T. K. Krishnasamy
- Produced by: T. R. Ramanna
- Starring: M. G. Ramachandran; B. Saroja Devi; Kanchana
- Cinematography: M. A. Rahman
- Edited by: M. S. Mani
- Music by: M. S. Viswanathan
- Production company: R. R. Pictures
- Release date: 11 November 1966
- Running time: 171 minutes
- Country: India
- Language: Tamil

Parakkum Pavai (pronounced [paɾakːɯm paːʋaɪ] transl. The Flying Woman) is a 1966 Indian Tamil-language drama film, directed by T. R. Ramanna, starring M. G. Ramachandran, B. Saroja Devi and Kanchana. The film was released on 11 November 1966 and grossed an average return, having run in theatres for 80 days. The film's plot is loosely inspired by Girl on the Run (1953). It served as an inspiration for the Hindi film Caravan (1971).

== Plot ==
Jeeva, the son of a businessman, promises a dying man, Vedhachalam, that he will take care of his daughter Kala. To do so, he obtains employment as a trapeze artist in the National Circus.

== Cast ==
- M. G. Ramachandran as Jeeva
- B. Saroja Devi as Kala
- Kanchana as Shantha
- J. P. Chandrababu as Rubber
- R. S. Manohar as Kabali
- K. A. Thangavelu as the director of the National Circus
- S. V. Ramadas as Veeramuthu
- V. Nagayya as Vedhachalam
- O. A. K. Thevar as Balasubramaniyam
- M. N. Nambiar as Rangasamy
- S. A. Ashokan as Vijayan
- " Mottai " Natarajan as Professional Killer Dhandapani
- Sadan as the leader of the group of the men in "Nilavenna Aadi"
- Rajasulochana as Sarasu
- G. Sakunthala as Kannamma
- S. D. Subbulakshmi as Amaniyamma
- Manorama as Dilruba
- Madhavi as Rita

== Production ==
Parakkum Pavai was produced and directed by T. R. Ramanna under R. R. Pictures, and written by Sakthi T. K. Krishnasamy. Cinematography was handled by M. A. Rehman. The film was prominently shot in an actual circus location.

== Soundtrack ==
The music was composed by M. S. Viswanathan, with lyrics by Kannadasan.

Song	Singers	Length
"Kalyaana Naal Paarkka Sollalaamaa"	T. M. Soundararajan, P. Susheela	04:25
"Muththamo Mogamo"	T. M. Soundararajan, L. R. Eswari	06:15
"Nilavennum Aadai kondaalo"	T. M. Soundararajan, P. Susheela	03:18
"Sugam Yethilae"	T. M. Soundararajan, L. R. Eswari, K. J. Yesudas	04:09
"Unnaiththaaney yeai"	T. M. Soundararajan, P. Susheela	03:19
"Yaaraiththaan Nambuvadho"	P. Susheela	03:08
"Pattup Paavaadai Enge"	T. M. Soundararajan	03:16

== Release and reception ==
Parakkum Pavai was released on 11 November 1966. The Indian Express wrote, "Spectacular thrills, spills, breathtaking serial feats and a dazzling display of acrobatics highlight R. R. Pictures Parakkum Pavai [...] a social drama set against an exciting panorama of circus life." Kalki also lauded the film for the circus scenes. Despite this, according to historian Randor Guy, the film was not a major success as it ran for only 80 days in theatres.
