= Avan Oru Sarithiram =

1977 film by K. S. Prakash Rao

- Theatrical release poster
- Directed by: K. S. Prakash Rao
- Screenplay by: G. Balasubramaniyam
- Story by: Selvabharathi
- Produced by: K. S. Kutralingam
- Starring: Sivaji Ganesan; Manjula; Kanchana
- Cinematography: A. Vincent
- Edited by: R. Devarajan
- Music by: M. S. Viswanathan
- Production company: Gomathisankar Pictures
- Release date: 14 January 1977
- Country: India
- Language: Tamil

Avan Oru Sarithiram (transl. He has made history) is a 1977 Indian Tamil-language film directed by K. S. Prakash Rao and produced by K. S. Kutralingam. The film stars Sivaji Ganesan, Manjula and Kanchana. It was released on 14 January 1977.

== Plot ==
Shankar, his brother Muthu, their father Namachivayam, mother Lakshmi, sister Gowri, and betrothed Gomathi, all live in a well-to-do happy family. Shankar becomes a collector to fulfill his father's desire while Muthu becomes a farmer and turns into a revolutionary, seeing the atrocities committed by the corrupt politicians and officials.

Gowri falls in love with Ramu, son of Vedhachalam, a businessman who is married for the second time to a young woman and has his father-in-law as his guide. Vedhachalam intends to use his connection to the family to get a few files signed and some properties belonging to the government acquired in his name. The honest upright Shankar insults him causing a rift between the two families. Vedhachalam, having felt insulted, wants to take vengeance by ruining the family. He aims to acquire all the land belonging to Namachivayam to whom his land is as sacred as his own mother. He becomes an M.L.A, uses his influence and gets the land acquired through Shankar in his capacity as collector with the excuse that it is ideal for TB hospital. He later subverts the collector and gets it allotted for his purpose. This causes Namachivayam to die and Shankar to resign. He starts a magazine to expose the corrupt nexus above him with the support of Kalpana, Vedhachalam's foreign-educated doctor daughter who cannot bear to see her father's evil activities.

In the end, seeing the influence of Shankar as a journalist grow, he attempts to kill him only to end up killing his own daughter for which he and his cohorts are arrested. Seeing that violence begets violence, Muthu too surrenders.

== Cast ==
- Sivaji Ganesan as Sankar I.A.S, Sub Collector
- Manjula as Gomathi
- Kanchana as Kalpana
- T. K. Bhagavathi as Nattamai Namachivayam
- Pandari Bai as Lakshmi
- Srikanth as Muthu
- Major Sundarrajan as Head Collector
- S. V. Ramadas as Collector Secretary
- K. A. Thangavelu, Vedhachalam's uncle
- V. K. Ramasamy as Vedhachalam
- Manorama as Vedhachalam's Second wife
- Cho as Ramu
- M. Bhanumathi as Gowri
- C. I. D. Sakunthala as Dancer
- Karuppu Subbaiya as Villager

== Production ==
The film was launched at Vauhini Studios in July 1974 with Ganesan's granddaughter Vijayalakshmi switching on the camera to start the shoot. Two songs and romantic scenes of Ganesan and Manjula were shot at Courtallam. The song "Ammaanai Azhagu" was shot at Brindavan Garden, Mysore.

== Soundtrack ==
The music was composed by M. S. Viswanathan. The song "En Manadhu Ondrudhaan" is partially based on "Für Elise" by Ludwig van Beethoven. The song "Ammaanai" is set in Dharmavati raga, and "Vanakkam" is set in Abhogi.

| Song | Singers | Lyrics | Length |
|---|---|---|---|
| "Aayiram Ponnai" | M. S. Viswanathan, Nellai Ganapathy | Nellai Arulmani | 03:13 |
| "Ammaanai" | T. M. Soundararajan, Vani Jairam | Kannadasan | 04:45 |
| "Vanakkam" | T. M. Soundararajan, P. Susheela | Kannadasan | 05:57 |
| "Maalaiyittaan" | T. M. Soundararajan, Vani Jairam | Kannadasan | 03:19 |
| "Naalai Enna Naalai" | T. M. Soundararajan | Kannadasan | 03:16 |
| "Inikkum Kannangal" | L. R. Eswari | Kannadasan | 03:12 |

== Reception ==
Kanthan of Kalki appreciated the cinematography but criticised the story.
