= Panam Padaithavan =

1965 film by T. R. Ramanna

- Theatrical release poster
- Directed by: T. R. Ramanna
- Written by: Sakthi T. K. Krishnasamy
- Produced by: T. R. Ramanna
- Starring: M. G. Ramachandran; Sowcar Janaki; K. R. Vijaya
- Cinematography: M. A. Rahman
- Edited by: M. S. Mani
- Music by: Viswanathan–Ramamoorthy
- Production company: R. R. Pictures
- Release date: 27 March 1965
- Running time: 168 minutes
- Country: India
- Language: Tamil

Panam Padaithavan (transl. The one who has money) is a 1965 Indian Tamil-language film produced and directed by T. R. Ramanna, and written by Sakthi T. K. Krishnasamy. The film stars M. G. Ramachandran, Sowcar Janaki and K. R. Vijaya. It was released on 27 March 1965.

== Plot ==
While making his way to Calcutta, accompanied by his young brother, Balu, for an athletic championship, Raja, an accomplished sportsman, stemming from a rich rustic Tamil family. Raja and Balu met Shanti's father, Masilamani in accident. Masilamani is a drunkard got addicted to liquor due to his wife death. Raja shows mercy towards them and got acquainted with Shanti and with her father, Masilamani, in very modest condition. Between Raja and Shanti, it is love at first sight.

Having won the championship, Raja and Balu meets Rama and Uma, two sisters were accompanied by their wealthy father G.R. Pillai. Shanthi happens to work as servant in Rama and Uma's house. Eventually, Balu and Uma, fall in love each other. Rama has difficulty in seducing Raja for a very good reason, he thinks only of Shanti. Rama is an overly social lady, which Raja dislikes, so he avoids her. G.R. Pillai happens to be distant relative and good friend of Raja and Balu's father Shanmuga Pillai, invites Raja and Balu parents to fix her daughters marriage to Raja and Balu. However, Raja reject Rama. Indeed, because he refuses the hand of Rama, his father also refuses to give Uma to Balu. He wants his two daughters to marry both brothers.

Meanwhile, a mysterious man Kuppan, off and on black-mail Shanmuga Pillai. Balu, then, sinks into alcohol to drown his sorrows and accuses Raja that because of him, Balu and Uma are unable to marry. For the happiness of his younger brother, he skips the one that he loves and resigns to marry Rama. However, Raja heart-brokenly informs his decision to Shanthi. Shanthi is unable to bear this and decides to kill herself.

After Raja and Balu marriage, Raju receives a phone call that Shanthi was admitted in hospital due to seriousness of her suicide attempt, which irritates Rama. The next day, everyone leaves to Raja's native place, except Raja and Rama. Rama who still hates Raja, plays a prank that she receives call from Joker that he is serious. Rama rushes to the club house to meet Joker. Soon Rama have guilty feeling on cheating Raja and her own behaviour. Joker misbehaves towards Rama. Raja arrives there and fight between Raja and Joker ensues. In the fight, Joker shoots Rama, Rama succumbs to her injury and dies. Before she dies, she repent her mistakes to Raja. The police soon arrest the Joker. Raja heart-broken joins military.

After few years, Raja got injured in the battlefields and return to his village. There, Balu found out that his brother still in love with Shanthi. Balu goes to Calcutta and invites Shanthi and her father, Masilamani to get Shanthi and Raja married. Once they arrived there, Raja and everyone shocked to hear, that Shanthi's father, Masilamani is low-caste person, and used to worked Shanmuga Pillai's farm. Shanthi's father, Masilamani eloped with Shanmuga Pillai's own sister (Raja's aunt). Soon or later, Shanthi is born and her mother died. Due to this, Shanmuga Pillai hates Shanthi's father and chases away Raja, Shanthi and her father.

Raja and Shanthi soon decide to marry, but during the ceremony, Kuppan tries to stop them, but Raja overcomes Kuppan and marries Shanthi. Balu supports his brother Raja's marriage. Raja gets job in a gym. Shanthi gets pregnant. Shanmuga Pillai informs Balu that, if he didn't get child soon, his property will be given to charity. He informs Shanthi to support him in order for their family unity. Balu schemes. Balu and Uma lies to Shanmuga Pillai that Uma is pregnant. Balu sends Uma to Calcutta her (fake) pregnancy. Shanthi delivers a baby boy. Balu and Uma comes while Raja away to his work and persuade Shanthi to give her child to Balu and Uma. Balu reveals his plan to Shanthi that to bring Raja's son like Balu's son. Shanthi half-hearted let Balu take his son. Shanmuga Pillai delighted to see the baby, thinking it is Balu's son.

Raja later learned of this. He also reluctantly agrees to their plan. As the days goes by, Raja and Shanthi misses their son. Seeing this, Masilamani goes see Balu. However, Shanmuga Pillai learned of the incident from Masilamani, gives the baby to Shanthi's father. Shanmuga Pillai, however, misses Raja's son and decides to go to see Raja's son. Soon Raja and Shanmuga Pillai realises, that Raja's son and Masilamani were kidnapped by Kuppan the mysterious man who, blackmail Shanmuga Pillai earlier on.

Shanmuga Pillai reveal to Raja, before coming to the village, he was collaborating with Kuppan in smuggling business and eventually jailed for two months. Using this Kuppan often black-mail Shanmuga Pillai for money. Raja finally saves the baby from Kuppan.

The films end where, all the family members unite, whereby Balu reveals, Uma is pregnant.

== Cast ==
- M. G. Ramachandran as Raja
- Sowkar Janaki as Rama
- K. R. Vijaya as Shanti
- T. S. Balaiah as Shanmugam Pillai, Raja and Balu's father
- Nagesh as Balu
- S. A. Ashokan as The mysterious blackmailer named Kuppan
- R. S. Manohar as Rama's friend named Joker
- Geethanjali as Uma, Balu's wife
- A. K. Veerasamy as Masilamani, Shanti's father
- R. M. Sethupathi as Rama and Uma's father
- Seethalakshmi as Anjugam Raja and Balu's mother

== Production ==
Panam Padaithavan was produced and directed by T. R. Ramanna under R. R. Pictures, and written by Sakthi T. K. Krishnasamy. Cinematography was handled by M. A. Rehman, and editing by M. S. Money.

== Soundtrack ==
The music was composed by Viswanathan–Ramamoorthy, with lyrics Vaali. The song, "kan pona pokkile," had background music inspired from the Hindi song, "ajeeb daasthaan hei ye," from the Hindi movie, "Dil Hamaari aur Preeth Paraayi."
Ramachandran felt the song "Enakkoru Mahan", which had the lyrics "Ennakoru mahan pirappaan! – Avan Ennaipolave iruppan! Thanakkoru paathaiyai vahukaamal – En Thalaivan vazhiyile nadappan!" (A son will be born to me- and he will resemble me; Rather than treading on his own path – he will follow the route of my leader) was the inverse of his real self since he had no biological children.

Song	Singers	Length
"Antha Maapilai"	T. M. Soundararajan, P. Susheela	4:39
"Enakkoru Mahan"	T. M. Soundararajan	4:35
"Kannpona Pokkile"	T. M. Soundararajan	5:11
"Maanicka Thottil"	T. M. Soundararajan, P. Susheela, L. R. Eswari	4:19
"Paruvathil Konjam"	L. R. Eswari, T. M. Soundararajan	4:12
"Pavalakodiyil"	T. M. Soundararajan, L. R. Eswari	5:00
"Thannuyir Pirivadhai"	P. Susheela	4:41

== Release and reception ==
Panam Padaithavan was released on 27 March 1965. The film ran for over 100 days in theatres. The film was dubbed in Telugu as Kaala Chakkaram. Kalki praised the film citing Nagesh's humour and child's innocent smile makes them forgive the flaws, and felt that was enough.
