= Arunagirinathar (film) =

1964 film by T. R. Ramanna

- Theatrical release poster
- Directed by: T. R. Ramanna
- Screenplay by: Sakthi T. K. Krishnasamy
- Produced by: B. S. Moorthy
- Starring: T. M. Soundararajan; Sarada; B. S. Saroja
- Cinematography: G. K. Ramu
- Edited by: D. K. Shankar
- Music by: G. Ramanathan; T. R. Pappa
- Production company: Baba Art Productions
- Distributed by: Sarathy Pictures
- Release date: 7 August 1964
- Running time: 120 minutes
- Country: India
- Language: Tamil

Arunagirinathar (pronounced [aɾ̪uɳaɡiɾ̪in̪aːt̪aɾ̪]) is a 1964 Indian Tamil-language biographical film, directed by T. R. Ramanna and written by Sakthi T. K. Krishnasamy. Based on the life of 15th century Tamil poet of the same name, the film stars T. M. Soundararajan, supported by M. R. Radha, B. S. Saroja, Sarada, C. Lakshmi Rajyam and Master Raghunath. It was released on 7 August 1964.

== Plot ==
Arunagirinathar was born in the town of Tiruvannamalai in Tamil Nadu. Arunagiri is portrayed as attracted to the pleasures of the flesh and spent his youth pursuing a life of debauchery. He frequently visited his sneaky link, the prostitute Maragatham. His sister, Aadhilakshmi, wants to reform her brother, so she arranges his marriage with Gnanavalli. However, he is unhappy with his life, neglects his wife and continues his bad ways. He persuades his sister to sell all their property and their house to get money for his dissipation. Despite his sister giving him the money she earns, he reduces himself, his wife, and his sister to dire poverty. He contracts leprosy, and people avoid him.

Eventually Aadhilakshmi is unable to meet his demands for money to support his depraved life. Arunagiri says he will end his life because of this. To prevent Arunagiri from killing himself, his sister says that he should sell her to have money for his debauchery and gambling. However, as Arunagiri has leprosy, prostitutes avoid him. Aadhilakshmi offers herself to him to stop Arunagiri from committing suicide. This deeply shocks Arunagiri, and he realises the consequences his actions have had on his family. Arunagiri feels guilty and attempts suicide by jumping off a temple tower, but Lord Murugan himself, disguised as a pious young man, saves him. Murugan cures his leprosy, shows him a path of religious devotion, and initiates his composition of the Thiruppugal, an anthology of songs dedicated to Murugan. With this, Arunagiri composes his first song Muthaitharu patthith thirunagai, in praise of Murugan.

== Cast ==
- T. M. Soundararajan as Arunagirinathar
- Master Sridhar as young Arunagirinathar
- Sarada as Gnanavalli
- B. S. Saroja as Aadhilakshmi
- M. R. Radha as Samanthandam
- C. Lakshmi Rajyam as Maragatham
- R. Manohar as Tamil Pandit
- C. R. Parthiban as Vedan Lord Murugan (@Viralimalai)
- Master Raghunath as Lord Murugan
- Angamuthu as Maragatham's mother
- N. S. Kolappan as Annamalai

== Production ==
Arunagirinathar is based on the life of the poet of the same name who created Thirupugazh. This is the third film to be produced on this theme. B. S. Moorthy produced the film for Baba Art Productions. The script was written by Sakthi T. K. Krishnasamy.

== Soundtrack ==
The music was composed by G. Ramanathan and T. R. Pappa. The lyrics were by T. K. Krishnasamy. During production, Pappa completed the score after Ramanathan fell ill. The tune "Muthai Tharu" was composed by Pappa; before the recording, he called the religious preacher Kirupanandha Variyar, who explained its meaning. T. M. Soundararajan rehearsed for an entire day before he recorded it. The song is set in Shanmukhapriya raga. The song Nilavo Aval Irulo was a fully adapted tune originally composed by Salil Chowdhury for the Hindi film Maya (1961) sang by Mohammed Rafi and Lata Mangeshkar.

| Song | Singer | Lyrics | Length |
|---|---|---|---|
| "Aadavendum Mayile" | T. M. Soundararajan S. Janaki | T. K. Krishnasamy | 4:03 |
| "Nilavo Aval" | T. M. Soundararajan P. Susheela | T. K. Krishnasamy | 3:23 |
| "Penn Piranha Pavathai" | P. Susheela | T. K. Krishnasamy | 3:28 |
| "Muthai Tharu" | T. M. Soundararajan | Arunagirinathar | 4:10 |
| "Senkol Ezh Adthu" | T. M. Soundararajan | Arunagirinathar | 6:11 |
| "Ven Kudai Viruthu" | T. M. Soundararajan | Arunagirinathar | 1:13 |
| "Thandayani Vendayam" | T. M. Soundararajan | Arunagirinathar | 2:56 |
| "Pakkarai Vichitharamani" | T. M. Soundararajan | Arunagirinathar | 2:40 |
| "Yethanai Piravi Petru" | T. M. Soundararajan | T. K. Krishnasamy | 3:32 |
| "Santhaana Pushpa" | T. M. Soundararajan | Arunagirinathar | 3:10 |
| "Aadum Parivel" | T. M. Soundararajan | Arunagirinathar | 1:24 |
| "Amma Deivam Agivittal" | L. R. Eswari | T. K. Krishnasamy | |

== Release and reception ==
Arunagirinathar was released on 7 August 1964. The film was distributed by Sarathy Pictures in Madras. The Indian Express positively reviewed it for Soundararajan's performance and the music.
