= Mahatma Gandhi Library, Chennai =

Mahatma Gandhi Library
- 13.023032121073966°N 80.22500360520966°E
- Location: Chennai, India

Mahatma Gandhi Library, a private library, is located at Karaneesvrar Temple street at Saidapet in Chennai, Tamil Nadu, India.

== Origin ==
K.Mahalingam (87), who involved himself in the freedom struggle of India is maintaining the library. His parents M.Kuppusamy-Kanniammal followed the principles of the Congress party and involved themselves in it. He had occasion to talk with Mahatma Gandhi in 1946, and was attracted by him. He wanted to serve the people by way of starting a library. With the help of their friends he started the library on 2 November 1952 and running the library. The library was inaugurated by Parali S.Nellaiyappar and is functioning in the present address now. The inaugural function was headed by C. R. Ramaswamy, the then Congress M.L.A.

== Development ==
In early stages the library had minimum number of books. But through his efforts and with the help of their friends he started collecting more books. Many eminent personalities like Rajaji, his son C. R. Narasimhan, Kannadasan, Gandhi Kannadasan, Akilan, Akilan Kannan, Tamilvanan, Lena Tamilvanan and others enthused him for his attempt. Now the library is functioning in rented building. He aims to have own building for the library and maintain it. This library functions for the cause of the general public. Sakthi T. K. Krishnasamy helped him much for this cause. He gave part of his salary to the library.

== Collections ==
30,000 books are available in this library. Of them more than 100 books are connected with Gandhi. Raghuvaṃśa written by Makakavi Kalidoss in 1935, the first detective novel, the journal named 'Amirtham' published by Kirupanandha Variyar from 1937 to 1952 are found in this library. Books on Sangam literature and modern Tamil literature are also found in the collection.

== Awards ==
This library has received many awards including the S. R. Ranganathan award. Monthly and yearly subscription are received from the readers. A member can take one book daily and return it the next day. The members are also contributing and helping him for maintaining the library.
