= S. V. Ramadas =

Indian actor

- Born: S. V. Ramadas; 1 January 1921
- Died: 8 August 2004 (aged 83); Chennai, Tamil Nadu, India
- Occupation: Actor
- Years active: 1960–1999
- Spouse: Chandra

S. V. Ramadas (1921-2004) was an Indian actor who appeared in Tamil-language films, most often as a villain. He acted in more than 700 films in a career spanning over four decades.

== Film career ==
The popular movies he acted in include Aayirathil Oruvan (1965), Nam Naadu (1969), Karnan (1964), Kuzhanthaikkaga (1968) and Punnagai (1971). He acted with a variety of actors including N. T. Rama Rao, M. G. Ramachandran, Sivaji Ganesan, Gemini Ganesan, Ravichandran, Jaishankar, R. Muthuraman, Rajnikanth, Kamal Haasan, Sarathkumar, and Arjun.

== Partial filmography ==
Year	Film	Role	Language	Notes
1962	Konjum Salangai	King Parthiban	Tamil	
1963	Ezhai Pangalan		Tamil	
1963	Konjum Kumari	Zamindar Jambulingam	Tamil	
1963	Anandha Jodhi	Abhu Salim	Tamil	
1964	Karnan	Indiran	Tamil	
1964	Puthiya Paravai	Raju	Tamil	
1964	Padagotti	Alaiyappan	Tamil	
1964	Chitrangi		Tamil	
1965	Aayirathil Oruvan	Sengappan	Tamil	
1965	Nee!	Sekar	Tamil	
1965	Vallavanukku Vallavan	Jambu	Tamil	
1965	Aasai Mugam	Vajravel	Tamil	
1966	Parakkum Paavai	Veeramuthu	Tamil	
1966	Gowri Kalyanam	Ayyakannu	Tamil	
1966	Yaar Nee	Doctor Giri	Tamil	
1966	Ramu	Lakshmi's father	Tamil	
1966	Anbe Vaa	Secretary	Tamil	
1966	Thaaye Unakkaga		Tamil	
1966	Aggi Barata	Gajapati	Telugu	
1967	Kandhan Karunai		Tamil	
1967	Thangai	Bhagathoor	Tamil	
1967	Adhey Kangal	Vimalanathan	Tamil	
1967	Sri Krishnavatharam	Rukmi	Telugu	
1967	Ave Kallu		Telugu	
1967	Deiva Cheyal		Tamil	
1968	Lakshmi Kalyanam	Rajadurai	Tamil	
1968	Kudiyirundha Koyil	Ramanathan	Tamil	
1968	Ramu	Sipai Singanna	Telugu	
1968	Kuzhanthaikkaga	Nazir	Tamil	
1968	Neelagiri Express	Boopathy	Tamil	
1968	Uyarndha Manithan	Sankaralingam	Tamil	
1969	Anjal Petti 520	Moorthy	Tamil	
1969	Nam Naadu	The doctor	Tamil	
1969	Thirudan	Vasudevan	Tamil	
1969	Bommalu Cheppina Katha		Telugu	
1969	Sipai Chinnaiah		Telugu	
1970	Vilaiyaattu Pillai	Maharaja	Tamil	
1970	Thalaivan		Tamil	
1970	Vietnam Veedu	Nandagopal	Tamil	
1970	Raman Ethanai Ramanadi	Balu	Tamil	
1971	Bhale Papa	Inspector Jagadish	Telugu	
1971	Iru Dhuruvam		Tamil	
1971	Revolver Rani	Seshu	Telugu	
1971	Thangaikkaaga	Doss	Tamil	
1971	Punnagai		Tamil	
1971	Rickshawkaran	Mannarai	Tamil	
1972	Rani Yaar Kuzhantai	Daniel	Tamil	
1972	Kanimuthu Paappa		Tamil	
1972	Dharmam Engey	Soldger	Tamil	
1972	Vasantha Maligai	Hotel Manager	Tamil	
1972	Nalla Neram	Raju's Father	Tamil	
1972	Pilla Piduga	Jai/Baba	Telugu	
1972	Nijam Nirupistha	Mallaiah, Member of the bandits gang	Telugu	
1972	Etho Enthan Deivam		Tamil	
1973	Bharatha Vilas	Kilburt	Tamil	
1973	Engal Thanga Raja	Dharmalingam	Tamil	
1973	Rajapart Rangadurai	Mohanraj	Tamil	
1973	Devudamma	Alex	Telugu	
1973	Oka Naari Vandha Thupakulu	Durgadas	Telugu	
1973	Thirumalai Deivam	Viswamithrara	Tamil	
1974	Vairam		Tamil	
1974	Anbu Thangai		Tamil	
1974	Roshakkari		Tamil	
1974	Panathukkaga	Masilamani	Tamil	
1975	Idhayakkani		Tamil	
1975	Melnaattu Marumagal		Tamil	
1975	Annadammula Anubandham	Ranjith	Telugu	
1975	Ninaithadhai Mudippavan	Ranjith's hired man	Tamil	
1975	Aayirathil Oruthi	Paranthaman	Tamil	Guest appearance
1976	Ore Thanthai		Tamil	
1976	Unakkaga Naan	Bar fighter	Tamil	
1976	Unarchigal	Bhoopathy	Tamil	
1977	Avan Oru Sarithiram	Collector Secretary	Tamil	
1977	Dheepam	Vasu	Tamil	
1977	Gadusu Pillodu	James	Telugu	
1977	Annan Oru Koyil		Tamil	
1978	Mangudi Minor		Tamil	
1978	Ennai Pol Oruvan	Velu	Tamil	
1979	Thirisoolam		Tamil	
1980	Punnami Naagu		Telugu	
1980	Kaksha		Telugu	
1980	Hunnimeya Rathriyalli		Kannada	
1980	Jamboo		Tamil	
1980	Devi Dharisanam		Tamil	
1983	Dharma Poratam	Brahmaji	Telugu	
1983	Thyagi	Balarathnam	Tamil	
1984	Goonda	Bhupal	Telugu	
1987	Hanthakudi Veta		Telugu	
1997	Abhimanyu		Tamil	
1998	En Aasai Rasave		Tamil	
1998	Moovendhar	Poochi	Tamil	
1999	House Full	Security guard	Tamil	
1999	Viralukketha Veekkam	Factory Owner	Tamil	
1999	Mudhalvan	Minister Thirupathisamy	Tamil	

== Death ==
He died on 8 August 2004, following a brief illness. He was survived by his three sons.
