= Kanchana (actress) =

Indian actress

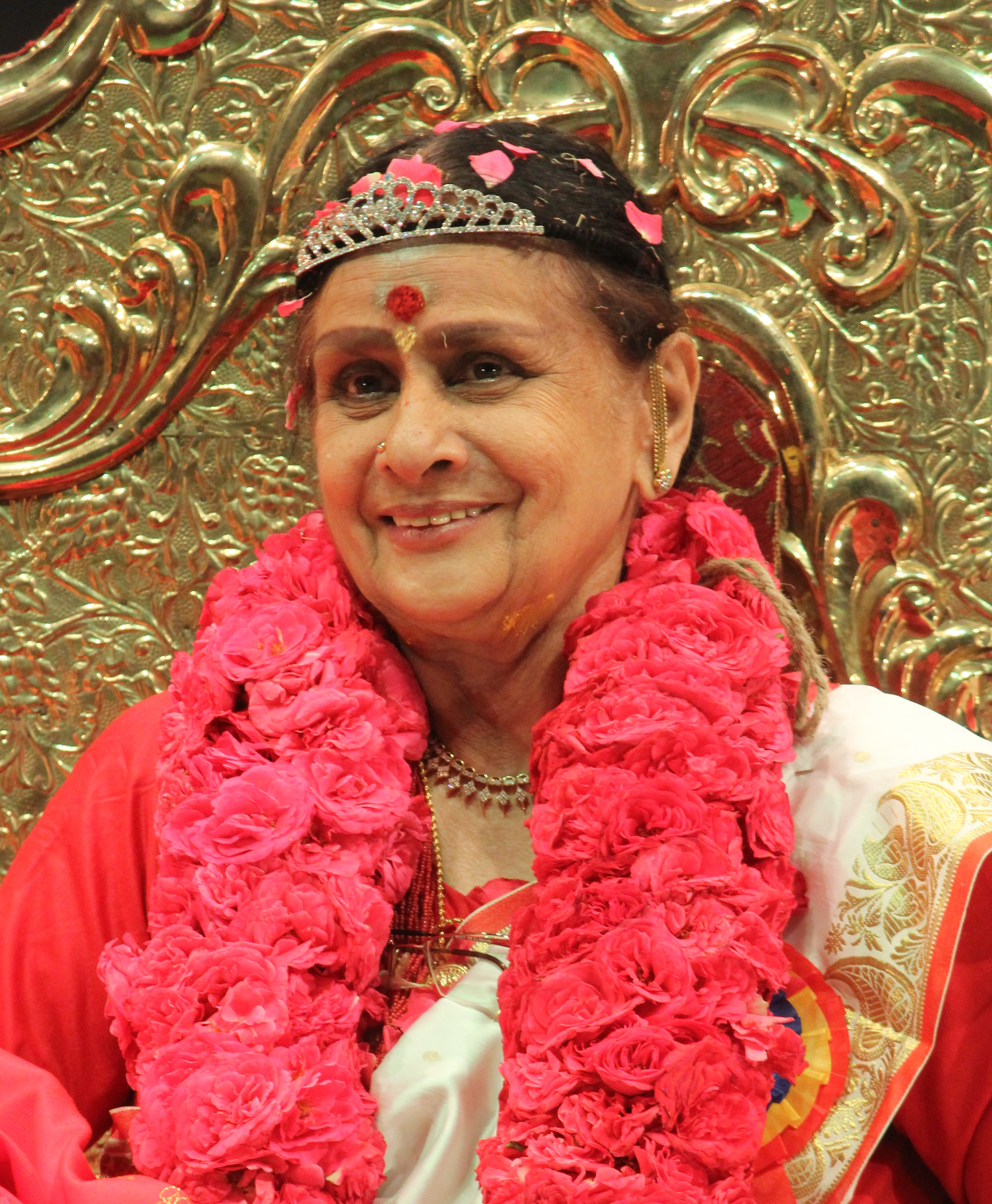
- Kanchana at an event
- Born: Vasundhara Devi; 16 August 1939 (age 87); Madras, Madras Presidency, British India
- Occupation: Actress
- Years active: 1957–1988; 2017

Vasundhara Devi (born 16 August 1939), known by her stage name Kanchana, is an Indian actress who primarily worked in Telugu, Tamil, and Kannada films, in addition to Malayalam and Hindi films.

== Early life ==
Kanchana was born as Vasundhara Devi on 16 August 1939 in Madras (now Chennai). Her father, Sathyanarayana Sasthri, was a civil engineer and her mother, Vidhyulatha, was a housewife. From a young age, Kanchana exhibited a strong artistic inclination, which was nurtured alongside her academic pursuits. She learned Bharatanatyam at an early age and performed her Arangetram at the Museum Theatre when she was just nine years old.

Kanchana pursued her education at Good Shepherd Convent, where she excelled in her studies. She later attended Ethiraj College for Women, where she continued to distinguish herself as a talented student. During her college years, she began participating in stage plays, notably portraying Celia in As You Like It and Sita in Manohar’s popular play Lankeswaran.

== Career ==
Initially interested in a career as an air hostess, Kanchana left college during her Intermediate studies to join Indian Airlines. However, her artistic aspirations soon led her to the film industry. While on a trip to Bombay, director Mahesh Kaul noticed her and offered her a screen test. Around the same time, producer Chezhian introduced her to director C. V. Sridhar at the Madras airport. Sridhar recognized her potential and offered her a role, which she accepted, preferring to start her film career in her hometown.

=== Film career ===
Kanchana had acted in minor roles in Suvarna sundari / Manaalane Mangaiyin Baakkiyam (1957) film and Seeta (1960) film but in January 1963, Kanchana joined Chithralaya as a permanent artist, marking the beginning of her acting career. Sridhar gave her the lead role in his film Kaadhalikka Neramillai (1963) and changed her name to Kanchana, since there was already another actress named Vasundhara Devi, mother of actress Vyjayanthimala. Her performance in the film received critical acclaim, setting the stage for her future success in the film industry.

Kanchana acted in over 150 films – Telugu, Tamil, Kannada, Malayalam and Hindi, with a successful acting career. She had a successful career in Tamil films, especially between 1964 and 1977 as a lead heroine. Her critically acclaimed films include Kaadhalikka Neramillai, Thedi Vantha Thirumagal, Parakkum Paavai, Kodimalar, Adhey Kangal, Bama Vijayam, Naalum Therindavan, Thangai, Thulabaram, Ponnu Mappilai, Shanti Nilayam, Chella Penn, Uthiravindri Ulle Vaa, Vilaiyaattu Pillai, Sivanda Mann, Nyayam Ketkirom, Avalukendru Or Manam, and Engalakkum Kaadhal Varum. She retired from films in the mid-80s itself.

In 2005, she was presented with the MGR award and in 2007 the ANR Swarna Kankanam award. In Tamil, her pairing with Ravichandran was the most famous with all their films - Adhey Kangal, Kadhalikka Neram Illai, Utharavindri Ullevaa, Kadhal Jyoti, Thedivandha Thirumagal and Naalum Therindavan being hits. She acted in some films with R. Muthuraman including Kaadhalikka Neramillai, Kodimalar, Thulabharam (Tamil version), Thangai, Bama Vijayam and Avalukendru Or Manam. She also acted with Sivaji Ganesan in Sivandha Mann, which was a blockbuster hit along with Vilayattu Pillai and Avan Oru Sarithiram.

She did two films with MGR - Naan Yen Pirandhen and Parakkum Paavai as the second lead heroine of the film. Apart from that, she was paired with many Tamil heroes like A. V. M. Rajan, S. S. Rajendran, Gemini Ganesan, Jaishankar, Ravichandran and Sivakumar in Tamil. Her last film as lead heroine in Tamil was Avan Oru Sarithiram in Tamil and Babruvahana in Kannada, both in 1977. Her performances in the movies Pavitra Bandham & Manchivaadu were well appreciated and recognized. She played Uttara in the film Veerabhimanyu. The following year she acted in the Annapurna Pictures' film Aatma Gowravam with veteran director K. Viswanath. She acted with Krishnam Raju in some glamorous roles in Neeti Nijayitee (1972), Parivartana (1975), Nenante Nene and Dharma Daata in addition to Shri Krishnavataram (1967).

After her retirement as a heroine, she acted in supporting roles in films such as Ananda Bhairavi, Srimad Virat Veerabrahmendra Swami Charitra, Johnny and Mouna Ragam. Kanchana appeared in an OLX commercial (Telugu/Tamil) in 2015. She made her comeback to films with Arjun Reddy in 2017 as the titular character's grandmother.

== Personal life ==
The actress later won back her properties in T. Nagar, Chennai around 6 grounds, with the Court ruling against her parents. It was learned that one day her father took the signature of Kanchana on a white paper and without her knowledge converted total assets on his name. After a long legal battle, she won and regained her wealth.. Kanchana along with her sister, Girija, donated their property in Chennai, then worth around Rs. 100 crores, to Tirumala Tirupati Devasthanams (TTD) on 25 October 2010. She is currently residing in Bangalore.

== Filmography ==
Key
†	Denotes films that have not yet been released

=== Telugu ===
Year	Movie	Role	Notes
1957	Suvarna Sundari	Nagakanya	Credited as Vasundhara
1960	Bhatti Vikramarka	Goddess Kali	
1965	Aatma Gowravam	Savitri/Sarala	
1965	Preminchi Choodu	Kanchanamala	
1965	Veerabhimanyu	Uttara	
1966	Navarathri	Patient	Cameo appearance
1966	Dr. Anand	Vijaya	
1967	Ave Kallu	Susheela	
1967	Prana Mithrulu	Padmavathi	
1967	Kanchu Kota	Dancer	Cameo appearance
1967	Private Master	Sundari	
1967	Sri Krishnavataram	Sathyabhama	
1967	Marapurani Katha		
1968	Manchi Kutumbam	Sharadha	
1968	Bandhipotu Dongalu	Malli	
1968	Nenante Nene	Geetha	
1968	Deva Kanya	Kinnera/Lalasa	
1968	Veeranjaneya	Sulochana	
1968	Thalli Prema		
1968	Kalisochina Adrushtam	Sobha	
1968	Vintha Kapuram	Vijaya	
1968	Bhale Kodallu		
1969	Bhale Mastaru	Vijaya	
1969	Manushulu Marali		
1969	Saptaswaralu		
1969	Natakala Rayudu	Geetha Devi	
1969	Jarigina Katha		
1970	Dharma Daata	Padma	
1971	Kalyana Mandapam	Devadasi	
1971	Pavitra Bandham		
1971	Amaayakuraalu	Shobha	
1971	Rangeli Raja	Vijaya	
1971	Andam Kosam Pandem	Malathi	
1972	Raitu Kutumbam	Radha	
1972	Manchi Rojulu Vachchaayi	Geetha	
1972	Vamsodharakudu		
1973	Pedda Koduku		
1973	Bhakta Tukaram	Bahina Bai	
1973	Devudu Chesina Manushulu	Geetha	
1973	Manchivadu	Lalitha	
1973	Talli Kodukulu		
1974	Tatamma Kala	Seetha	
1975	Maya Maschindra	Mohini	
1975	Annadammula Anubandham	Geetha	
1976	Mahakavi Kshetrayya		
1976	Secretary	Rekha Rani	
1977	Daana Veera Soora Karna	Subhadra	
1977	Indradhanusu		
1977	Raja Ramesh	Padmaja	
1978	Kalanthakulu	Kamala	
1978	Dongala Dopidi	Gowri	
1978	Indradhanussu	Saraswathi	
1979	Driver Ramudu	Kalavathi	
1981	Gadasari Atta Sogasari Kodalu	Kamala	
1982	Naa Desam	Saraswati Devi	
1983	Anandha Bhairavi		
1984	Srimadvirat Veerabrahmendra Swami Charitra	Govindamma	
1985	Sri Datta Darsanam		
1986	Kirayi Mogudu	Janaki	
1986	Jayam Manade	Savithri	
1986	Sri Shirdi Saibaba Mahathyam		
1988	Premayanam		
2017	Arjun Reddy	Arjun's grandmother	
TBA	Spirit †	TBA	

=== Tamil ===
Year	Movies	Role	Note
1964	Kaadhalikka Neramillai	Kanchana	Debut film
1965	Veera Abhimanyu	Uttara	
1966	Motor Sundaram Pillai	Kamala	
1966	Thedi Vantha Thirumagal	Susheela	
1966	Parakkum Paavai	Shantha	
1966	Kodimalar	Parvathi	
1966	Marakka Mudiyumaa?		
1967	Adhey Kangal	Susheela	
1967	Bama Vijayam	Seetha	
1967	Thangai	Lalitha	
1968	Naalum Therindhvan	Mala	
1969	Chella Penn		
1969	Ponnu Mappillai	Bhuvana	
1969	Shanti Nilayam	Malathi	
1969	Thulabaram	Vatsala	
1969	Sivandha Mann	Chitralekha	
1970	Noorandu Kalam Vazhga	Leela	
1970	Vilaiyaattu Pillai	Indu	
1970	Kadhal Jothi	Dr. Suguna	
1971	Avalukendru Or Manam	Meena	
1971	Uttharavindri Ulle Vaa	Janaki	
1972	Naan Yen Pirandhen	Radha	
1973	Nyayam Ketkirom		
1975	Engalakkum Kaadhal Varum		
1977	Avan Oru Sarithiram	Kalpana	
1979	Ninaivil Oru Malar		
1979	Neethiyaa Nyayamaa		
1979	Jaya Nee Jayichutte		
1980	Johnny	Johnny's mother	
1981	Lorry Driver Rajakannu	Ramu's wife	
1982	Pagadai Panirendu	Anand's mother	
1985	Kattukkulle Thiruvizha		
1986	Mouna Raagam	Lawyer	
1986	Kulirkaala Megangal	Maheswari	
1987	Naanum Neeyum		
1987	Kizhakku Africavil Sheela	Kumudha	

=== Kannada ===
Year	Film	Role	Notes
1977	Babruvahana	Uloochi	
1978	Nanobba Kalla	Savitri	
1978	Shankar Guru	Sumati	
1980	Biligiriya Banadalli		
1980	Aarada Gaaya	Mangala	
1981	Jeevakke Jeeva	Seetha	
1981	Bhagyavantha		
1982	Nyaya Ellide	Durga	
1982	Pedda Gedda		
1982	Prachanda Kulla	Rama's mother	
1983	Anandha Bhairavi		
1983	Bhakta Prahlada	Diti	
1984	Maryade Mahalu		
1984	Raktha Thilaka	Durga	
1984	Bandhana		
1984	Pralayanthaka		
1984	Samayada Gombe	Kamakshi	
1985	Veeradhi Veera		
1985	Nanna Prathigne	Mangala	
1985	Chaduranga	Dr. Maheshwari	
1985	Bidugadeya Bedi	Ratna	
1986	Ratha Sapthami	Sharada	
1986	Beegara Pandya		
1986	Africadalli Sheela		
1987	Vijayothsava		
1987	Jayasimha		
1988	Chiranjeevi Sudhakar		
1988	Dharma Pathni		
1988	Devatha Manushya		

=== Malayalam ===
Year	Movie	Role
1973	Azhakulla Saleena	Lucyamma
1977	Ammaayi Amma	
1979	Nithya Vasantham	
1979	Rakthamillatha Manushyan	
1982	Ina	Aunty
1984	Sreekrishna Parunthu	Kumaran's mother
1985	Pournami Raavil 3D	
1985	Njaan Piranna Naattil	Nandini

=== Hindi ===
Year	Movie	Role	Note
1967	Farz	Kamala	
1968	Teen Bahuraniyan	Seeta	
1970	Samaj Ko Badal Dalo	Vimla	
1974	Prem Nagar	Dancer	
1987	Sheela		

== Awards ==
- She was presented with the MGR award in 2005.
- ANR Swarna Kankanam award in 2007.
- Kalaimamani award for her distinguished services for Tamil Cinema by the Government of Tamil Nadu, 2013
- Karnataka Rajyotsava Award by State Government Of Karnataka in 2017
