= Haathi Mere Saathi (1971 film) =

- Directed by: M. A. Thirumugam
- Screenplay by: Salim–Javed
- Story by: Sandow M. M. A. Chinnappa Thevar
- Based on: Deiva Cheyal (1967)
- Produced by: Sandow M. M. A. Chinnappa Thevar
- Starring: Rajesh Khanna; Tanuja; Madan Puri; Sujit Kumar; K. N. Singh
- Cinematography: K. S. Prasad
- Edited by: M. A. Thirumugam; M. G. Balu Rao
- Music by: Laxmikant–Pyarelal
- Production company: Devar Films
- Distributed by: Devar Films
- Release date: 21 May 1971
- Country: India
- Language: Hindi

Haathi Mere Saathi (transl. O Elephant, My Companion) is a 1971 Indian Hindi-language drama film, directed by M. A. Thirumugam, with screenplay written by Salim–Javed (Salim Khan and Javed Akhtar) and dialogues by Inder Raj Anand. The movie has a Disneyesque appeal with an Indian twist. It stars Rajesh Khanna and Tanuja in the lead. The film at that point in time was the biggest hit ever made by a South Indian producer in Hindi.

The story was written by producer Sandow M. M. A. Chinnappa Thevar who is of Tamil origin and owned Devar Films in Tamil Nadu. Thevar also played a small cameo in the film. Directed and edited by Thevar's brother M. A.Thirumugham, it had music by Laxmikant-Pyarelal and lyrics by Anand Bakshi. The film was also the first collaboration of Salim-Javed (Salim Khan and Javed Akhtar), who were officially credited as screenplay writers. The film was based on Sandow M. M. A. Chinnappa Thevar's 1967 Tamil movie Deiva Cheyal. After the success of this movie, Thevar remade it in Tamil again in 1972 as Nalla Neram.

== Plot ==
Orphaned Raju, in the company of four elephants, has to perform with them at street corners, in order to survive. The back-story is that as an orphan, they have saved his life from a leopard. In time, he makes it big, and starts Pyar Ki Duniya (The World of Love), a zoo in which various wild animals reside along with his elephants, among whom Ramu is closest to him. Slowly he amasses a fortune, and is able to build his own private zoo, housing tigers, lions, bears, and of course the four elephants. He treats all the animals as his friends. He meets with Tanu, and both fall in love. Tanu's rich dad, Ratanlal, is opposed to this alliance, but subsequently relents, and permits the young couple to get married. However, trouble looms soon after as Tanu feels neglected. Things worsen when their child is born, and Tanu, fearing physical harm to her child from the elephants, tells Raju to choose between the elephants and his family. When Raju chooses his lifelong friends over wife and son, Ramu decides to bring the estranged couple together, but to save the family and the child from the villainous Sarwan Kumar, he sacrifices his life.

== Cast ==
- Rajesh Khanna as Raj Kumar "Raju"
- Tanuja as Tanuja "Tanu"
- Madan Puri as Ratanlal
- Sujit Kumar as Gangu
- K. N. Singh as Shravan Kumar
- Mehmood Junior as Chhote
- Naaz as Paro
- David as Johny
- Abhi Bhattacharya as Kumar
- Jayakumari
- Chinnappa Thevar in a cameo appearance

== Soundtrack ==
| Song | Singer |
|---|---|
| "Dhak Dhak Kaise Chalti Hai Gaadi Dhak Dhak" | Lata Mangeshkar, Kishore Kumar |
| "Sunja Aa Thandi Hawa, Tham Ja Ae Kali Ghata" | Lata Mangeshkar, Kishore Kumar |
| "Dilbar Jaani Chali Hawa Mastani" | Lata Mangeshkar, Kishore Kumar |
| "Duniya Me Rehna Hai To" | Kishore Kumar |
| "Chal Chal Mere Saathi" | Kishore Kumar |
| "Nafrat Ki Duniya Ko" | Mohammed Rafi |

== Development ==
Javed Akhtar on being questioned as to how the film came about, said "One day, he Rajesh Khanna went to Salim-saab and said that Mr. Devar had given him a huge signing amount with which he could complete the payment for his bungalow Aashirwad. But the film was a remake of Deiva Cheyal and the script of the original was far from being satisfactory. He told us that if we could set right the script, he would make sure we got both money and credit. "I can't do such a terrible script," he said. "And I can't leave it because I need the money!'".

== Box office ==
Made at the peak of Khanna's career, Haathi Mere Saathi was a blockbuster and the highest-grossing Indian film of 1971. It is counted among the 17 consecutive hit films of Rajesh Khanna between 1969 and 1971, by adding the two-hero films Marayada and Andaz to the 15 consecutive solo hits. In India, its net income was ₹35 million and its total domestic gross was ₹70 million (US$9.34 million), equivalent to US$74 million (₹3.65 billion) with inflation. (Note: Haathi Mere Saathi: India: ₹70 million (US$9.34 million) (Note: 7.4919 Indian rupees per US dollar in 1971) in 1971 (equivalent to US$74 million or ₹3.65 billion in 2017); Soviet Union: 8.7 million SUR (Note: 34.8 million Soviet tickets sold, average Soviet ticket price of 25 kopecks)) (US$11.54 million, (Note: 0.7536 Soviet rubles per US dollar in 1974) ₹93.5 million) (Note: 8.1016 Indian rupees per US dollar in 1974) in 1974 (US$75 million or ₹9.48 billion in 2024))

The film was an overseas blockbuster in the Soviet Union, where it sold 34.8 million tickets in 1974. The film's overseas Soviet gross was 8.7 million rubles (US$11.54 million, or ₹93.5 million), equivalent to US$75 million (₹3.72 billion) with inflation. The film's total worldwide gross (including India and the Soviet Union) was ₹16.35 crore (US$20.88 million), equivalent to US$113 million (₹737 crore) in 2017.

== Awards ==
Earlier titled Pyar Ki Duniya, the film also won a special award from the Society for Prevention of Cruelty to Animals (SPCA) for lyricist Anand Bakshi. Its music on HMV won a Silver Disc for its sales, making it the first-ever Indian gramophone record to do so.

== Quotes on the film ==
In an interview, Tanuja said, "I showed them the film when Kajol was six and Tanishaa around three years old, and for two weeks Kajol did not speak to me!! "Mummy, you killed the elephant! Because of you, he had to die!" screamed Kajol! "And Tanishaa was annoyed too!" Tanuja loved working with the elephants after some initial apprehensions. "They really began to like me, especially the she-elephant who played Ramu. There is a sequence where he had to push me through a door and fight a snake that was about to bite the baby, but the elephant had got so fond of me that he refused to do so! Finally, they had to shoot separate close-ups of the elephant and my back and of me falling down!"

On its 40th anniversary on 5 May 2011, Pyarelal recalled, "Laxmi (Laxmikant) and Devar got along fabulously well! Devar had an innate music sense and a feel for rhythm, and he loved our title-track. But the tussle came up over the sad song, "Nafrat Ki Duniya", which was the only song sung by (Mohammed) Rafisaab in the film. I recall voicing my doubts. But Laxmi, the director and Rajesh Khanna were staunchly in favour of keeping that song. And the audience cried with the song and Anand Bakshisaab's lyrics."
