= Teen Bahuraniyan =

- Directed by: S. S. Vasan; S. S. Balan
- Written by: K. Balachander (story), Kishore Sahu (screenplay)
- Produced by: Gemini Pictures
- Starring: Prithviraj Kapoor; Ramesh Deo; Agha; Rajendra Nath; Sowcar Janaki; Kanchana; Jayanthi; Shashikala
- Music by: Kalyanji-Anandji
- Release date: 14 June 1968
- Country: India
- Language: Hindi

Teen Bahuraniyan (transl. Three Daughters-In-Law) is a 1968 Indian Hindi-language comedy film directed by S. S. Vasan and S. S. Balan. It is a remake of 1967 Tamil film Bama Vijayam. Sowcar Janaki, Kanchana and Jayanthi star as the female leads, reprising their roles from the original film.

== Cast ==
- Showkar Janaki as Parvati
- Kanchana as Seeta
- Jayanthi as Radha
- Prithviraj Kapoor as Dinanath
- Agha as Shankar
- Ramesh Deo as Ram
- Rajendranath as Kanhaiya
- Dhumal as Hari Prasad
- Kanhaiyalal as Seeta's Father
- Lalita Pawar as Seeta's Mother
- Niranjan Sharma as Parvati's Father
- Shashikala as Sheela Devi
- Jagdeep as Mahesh
- Baby Farida as Parvati's Daughter
- Vaishali as Mala

== Music ==
The film score is composed by the musical duo Kalyanji-Anandji, while the lyrics were written by Anand Bakshi.

=== Tracklist ===
No.	Title	Singer(s)	Length
1.	""Humre Angan Bagiya, Bagiya Mein Do Panchhi, Panchhi Ud Na Jaye Dekho""	Lata Mangeshkar, Asha Bhosle, Usha Mangeshkar
2.	""Aamdani Athanni, Kharcha Rupaiya, Bhaiya Na Poochho, Na Poochho Haal""	Manna Dey, Mahendra Kapoor, Asha Bhosle, Kamal Barot
3.	""Aa Sapnon Ki Rani, Aa Sapnon Ke Raja""	Kishore Kumar, Asha Bhosle
4.	""Meri Taraf Zara Dekh""	Asha Bhosle
5.	""Dilli Ke Bazaar Mein""	Asha Bhosle
