= Sreekrishnapurathe Nakshathrathilakkam =

1998 film by Rajasenan

- Directed by: Rajasenan
- Written by: Mani Shornur, Rajan Kizhakkanela (dialogues)
- Screenplay by: Mani Shornur
- Story by: Mani Shornur
- Produced by: Rajan
- Starring: Innocent; Cochin Haneefa; Jagathy Sreekumar; Nagma; K. P. A. C. Lalitha; Kalaranjini; Bindu Panicker; Oduvil Unnikrishnan
- Cinematography: K. P. Nambiyathiri
- Edited by: K. P. Hariharaputhran
- Music by: Berny Ignatius
- Production company: Highness Arts
- Distributed by: Kavyachandrika Release
- Release date: April 5, 1998 (India)
- Running time: 162 minutes
- Country: India
- Language: Malayalam

Sreekrishnapurathe Nakshathrathilakkam (transl. A Shining Star in Sreekrishnapuram) is a 1998 Indian Malayalam-language comedy drama film, directed by Rajasenan. It is a remake of the Tamil film Bama Vijayam (1967). The film features Innocent, Jagathy Sreekumar, Cochin Haneefa, Oduvil Unnikrishnan, K. P. A. C. Lalitha, Kalaranjini, Bindu Panicker and Nagma (In her Malayalam debut), although her previous Malayalam film, “Anna” was officially unreleased to date. It was produced by Highness Arts and was distributed by Kavyachandrika Release. The story and screenplay of the movie were written by Mani Shornur, to which Rajan Kizhakkanela added the dialogues.

== Plot ==
The plot revolves around the life in a typical, Malayali household named Shanthi Nilayam - consisting of four brothers: Nandakumar, a Hindi teacher in the local school, Krishnakumar, a court office clerk, Gopakumar, a medical representative and Chandrakumar, a college student. The first three brothers are married to: Kausalya, Anandavalli and Indumathi, who are three naive and shallow wives who adore their husbands dearly and the husbands equally love. The family is headed by their father, Munshi Parameshwaran Pillai, a widowed veteran Gandhian teacher respected by everyone in their village, who also home schools his grandchildren. The youngest brother Chandrakumar is in love with his to-be engaged fiancée, Asha, his cousin. Their relationship is oppressed by the family members because of a small feud between them. But otherwise, the household is a happy, peaceful and satisfied one until the arrival of their new neighbor, who is an irresistibly charming and beautiful South Indian film heroine Yamuna Rani. This turns the household upside down and sends the ladies into a frenzy. The ladies, in order to please the superstar, glamourise themselves, their husbands and the house. Thus, they form a formidable friendship with Yamuna Rani. Soon, trouble starts to brew when the loan with which they bought their new household items in order to impress Yamuna Rani needs to be paid back to the moneylender. The trouble further escalates when the ladies, each, receive a letter from an anonymous identity, which claims that one of the three men are having an extramarital affair with Yamuna Rani.

With the arrival of the letter, which devastates the ladies, chaos ensues. The husbands are under severe under pressure from their respective wives, who are trying to find out who that one person is. The distraught wives go to Yamuna Rani and plead, and the next day, she attempts suicide. Thus the husbands are taken into custody by the local police on account of traumatising Yamuna Rani. Later it is revealed that it was Munshi Parameshwaran Pilla himself, who sent the letter to the ladies to end their modus operandi. Yamuna Rani recovers later and testifies that it was not because of the husbands, but because of her foster mother Santhanavalli, who was pressurizing her to act inappropriately in a certain movie, that led her to attempt suicide. In the end all's well - Yamuni Rani heading back to her illustrious career taking with her the love and affection shown by the members of Shanthi Nilayam and the families decide to support the relationship between Chandrakumar and Asha.

== Cast ==
- Innocent as Nanda Kumar (Hindi Teacher)
- Cochin Haneefa as Krishna Kumar (High Court Clerk)
- Jagathy Sreekumar as Gopa Kumar (Medical Representative)
- Nagma as Actress Yamunarani (voiced by Saritha)
- K. P. A. C. Lalitha as Kausalya
- Kalaranjini as Anandavalli
- Bindu Panicker as Indumathi
- Oduvil Unnikrishnan as Munshi Parameshwara Pillai
- Sudheesh as Chandra Kumar alias Chandru (College Student)
- Praveena as Asha
- K. T. S. Padannayil as Veera Vikraman Pillai, Grandfather of Kumar brothers
- Yadukrishnan as Aniyankuttan, Asha's brother
- Paravoor Ramachandran as 'Poothakodan' Velappan, Asha's father
- Jagadish as SI 'Idivettu' Indrajith
- Jose Pellisseri as Ram Kumar, Yamunarani's manager
- Sajitha Betti as Kalyani
- Ancy K. Thampi as Rakhi/Molly
- Paravoor Bharathan as Kausalya's father
- Poojappura Ravi as Anandavalli's father
- Kochu Preman as Indhumathi's father
- Meena Ganesh as Kausalya's mother
- Cherthala Lalitha as Anandavalli's mother
- Thrissur Elsy as Indumathi's mother
- Kamala Devi as Yashoda, Asha's mother
- Vadivukkarasi as Actress Santhanavalli
- C.P. Prathapan as Production Manager
- Elias Babu as Hydros
- Kalabhavan Santhosh as Tea shop owner
- KPAC Leelamani as Nurse
- Bindu Murali as Yamunarani's Aaya
- Appa Haja as Movie Director
- Srihari as Movie Producer
- Mukesh as himself
- Rajan P. Dev as himself

== Soundtrack ==
The film's soundtrack contains 3 songs, all composed by Berny Ignatius, with lyrics by S. Ramesan Nair. BGM for the movie was done by S. P. Venkatesh.

#	Title	Singer(s)
1	"Ambilippoomarano"	K. S. Chitra, M. G. Sreekumar
2	"Oru Thulli Pala Thulli"	K. J. Yesudas, Daleema
3	"Thaaram Thaaram"	K. J. Yesudas

== Legacy ==
Years later, this film is considered one of the best comedy films of all time in Malayalam. Even now, scenes from it are watched and shared on social media by fans.

Indhumati C played by Bindu Panicker the wife of Gopakumar, a medical representative portrayed by Jagathy Sreekumar was the main highlight of the movie. Despite her limited education, Indumati frequently attempts to speak English with confidence, though her attempts often result in broken sentences with incorrect meanings. This aspect of her character serves as one of the main sources of humor throughout the movie. Indumati's use of English, despite the errors, gained recognition as a notable part of the film's humor. Her character, dialogues, and comic timing are often referenced in Kerala's entertainment culture. These elements have remained popular, with references to her role appearing on platforms like reels and TikTok.[6][7][8]
