= Bhale Kodallu =

- Poster
- Directed by: K. Balachander
- Written by: K. Balachander
- Produced by: S. S. Vasan
- Starring: S. V. Ranga Rao; Sowcar Janaki; Kanchana; Jayanthi; Nagabhushanam; Ramakrishna; Chalam; Rajasree; Saraswathi
- Music by: M. S. Viswanathan
- Production company: Gemini Studios
- Release date: 26 April 1968
- Running time: 174 minutes
- Country: India
- Language: Telugu

Bhale Kodallu (transl. Well done, daughter-in-law!) is a 1968 Telugu-language comedy film written and directed by K. Balachander. It was simultaneously filmed in Tamil as Bama Vijayam, despite being released more than a year after that. The film features an ensemble cast consisting of S. V. Ranga Rao, Sowcar Janaki, Kanchana, Jayanthi, Nagabhushanam, Ramakrishna, Chalam, Rajasree and Saraswathi.

== Plot ==
A movie star moves into the neighbourhood where a joint family of three married couples live. Her presence sends the three wives into a spending spree as they buy radios and fancy goods to keep up with their glamorous neighbour, while accusing their husbands of being too close to the star.

== Cast ==
Credits adapted from Chitra Seema:

- S. V. Ranga Rao as Narasimham
- Sowcar Janaki as Parvathi
- Kanchana as Seetha
- Jayanthi as Rukmini
- Nagabhushanam as Shankaram
- Ramakrishna as Ramam
- Chalam as Krishna
- Rajasree as the movie star
- Saraswathi as Sacchu

== Production ==
In 1965, when K. Balachander was "just getting his bearings in the film industry", his household was excited because Sowcar Janaki, a star, was due to visit their house. This incident laid the foundation for Bhale Kodallu, which was written and directed by Balachander, and produced by S. S. Vasan under Gemini Studios. It was simultaneously filmed in Tamil as Bama Vijayam, with a slightly different cast. The final length of the film was 4,767 metres (15,640 ft).

== Soundtrack ==
The soundtrack was composed by M. S. Viswanathan, while the lyrics were written by C. Narayana Reddy.

Track listing
No.	Title	Singer(s)	Length
1.	"Challini Illu"	P. Susheela, S. Janaki, L. R. Eswari
2.	"Nene Vachanu"	Pithapuram Nageswara Rao, L. R. Eswari
3.	"Aasthi Mooredu"	Sathyam M, L. R. Eswari
4.	"Vaade Vaadante"	P. Susheela
5.	"Akkada Choosina"	Pithapuram Nageswara Rao, L R. Easwari

== Release ==
Bhale Kodallu was released on 26 April 1968, over a year after Bama Vijayam (24 February 1967).

== Bibliography ==
- Rajadhyaksha, Ashish; Willemen, Paul (1998) [1994]. Encyclopaedia of Indian Cinema. British Film Institute and Oxford University Press. ISBN 0-19-563579-5.
