= Swalpa Adjust Madkolli =

- VCD cover
- Directed by: Kodlu Ramakrishna
- Produced by: K T Veeresh Gowda; S Venkatesh Murthy
- Starring: Ramkumar; Shruti; Ananth Nag; Suhasini
- Cinematography: Sundarnath Suvarna
- Edited by: B. S. Kemparaju
- Music by: Sadhu Kokila
- Production company: Sri Manjunatha Enterprises
- Release date: 8 December 2000
- Running time: 135 minutes
- Country: India
- Language: Kannada

Swalpa Adjust Madkolli (transl. Please adjust a little) is a 2000 Indian Kannada-language comedy drama film directed by Kodlu Ramakrishna. The film features Ananth Nag, Ramkumar, Suhasini, Gurukiran and Shruti in the lead roles. The film had the musical score by Sadhu Kokila. The film is a remake of 1967 Tamil film Bama Vijayam. The film was a box office failure.

== Cast ==
- Ananth Nag as Vasudeva Rao
- Ramkumar
- Suhasini
- Tara
- Shruti
- Gurukiran
- Ramakrishna
- Damini
- Chaithali
- H. G. Dattatreya
- Karibasavaiah
- Mandeep Roy

== Soundtrack ==
Swalpa Adjust Madkolli

Soundtrack album by Sadhu Kokila
- Genre: Feature film soundtrack
- Label: Anand Audio

The music of the film was composed by Sadhu Kokila. The audio was launched at Press Club of Bangalore, it was released by composer Vijaya Bhaskar.

Track listing
No.	Title	Lyrics	Singer(s)	Length
1.	"Baduku Olavina Goodu"	Srichandru	Rajesh Krishnan, K. S. Chithra
2.	"Chali Chali Eke"	V. Manohar	Rajesh Krishnan, K. S. Chithra
3.	"Aisa Aisa Idu"	Srichandru	Rajesh Krishnan, Nanditha
4.	"Chandavalli Chandavalli"	K. Kalyan	Rajesh Krishnan, Nanditha
5.	"Mareya Beda"	V. Manohar	Sadhu Kokila

== Reception ==
Chitraloka.com wrote "The big tragedy of this film is that you go to the theatres with the intention of watching a comedy film but you get disappointed. The director has used a wrong trick to draw your attention. It is a comedy less film". Online Bangalore wrote "Although the movie has so many weaknesses, it does help the audience to recollect the moral that has been suppressed by many other thoughts in this materialistic world. Those who can adjust with the shortcomings of the movie can go for this. It is a good family entertainer". India Info wrote "The movie is least hilarious and most uninteresting. It is a remake of Teen Bahuraniyaan an old Hindi classic, but a bad remake indeed!".
