= The World of Malgudi =

2000 short story collection by R. K. Narayan

First edition (publ. Penguin Books)

The World of Malgudi (2000) is a collection of four short Malgudi novels written by R. K. Narayan.

The novels in this collection are:

- Mr. Sampath - The Printer of Malgudi (1949)
- The Financial Expert (1952)
- The Painter of Signs (1976)
- A Tiger for Malgudi (1983)
