= Miss Malini =

1947 film by Kothamangalam Subbu

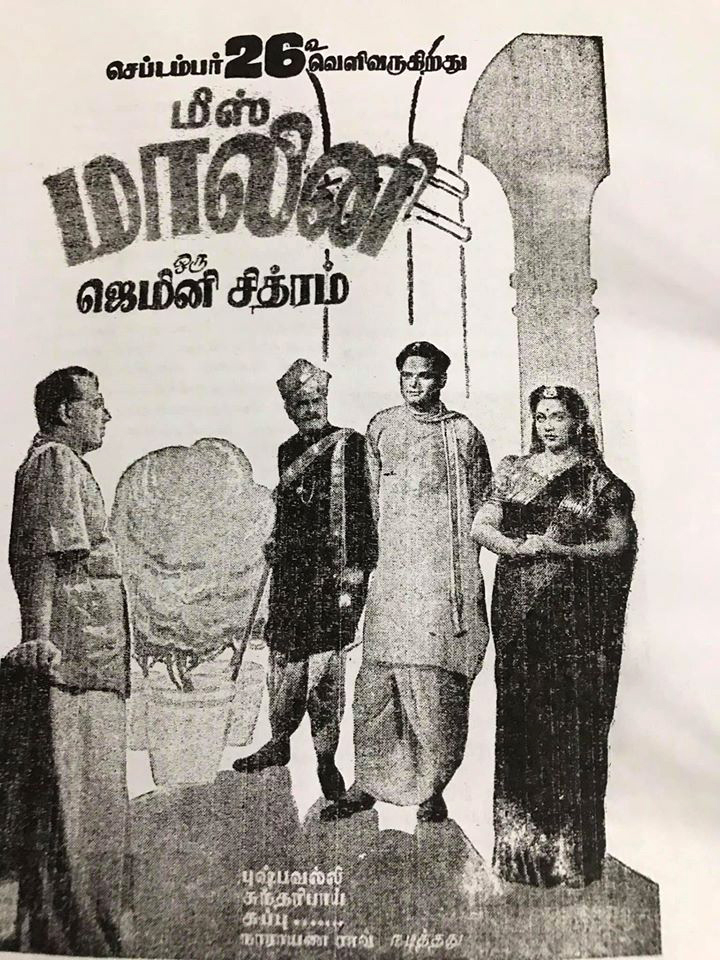
- Theatrical release poster
- Directed by: Kothamangalam Subbu
- Screenplay by: Kothamangalam Subbu
- Story by: R. K. Narayan
- Produced by: K. Ramnoth
- Starring: Pushpavalli
- Cinematography: M. Natarajan
- Edited by: N. K. Gopal
- Music by: S. Rajeswara Rao; Parur S. Anantharaman
- Production company: Gemini Studios
- Release date: 26 September 1947
- Country: India
- Language: Tamil

Miss Malini is a 1947 Indian Tamil-language satirical comedy drama film written and directed by Kothamangalam Subbu and produced by K. Ramnoth, from a story by R. K. Narayan. Subbu also starred in the film alongside Pushpavalli, Sundari Bai and Subbiah Pillai. Javar Seetharaman and Gemini Ganesan made their acting debuts in the film appearing in minor roles. The film focuses on Malini (Pushpavalli), an impoverished woman who joins her actress friend Sundari's (Sundari Bai) theatre company and becomes a success. Matters worsen when she befriends Sampath (Subbu), a charlatan.

Miss Malini ridiculed aspects of life in Madras (now Chennai) during the World War II period, and was the only story written by Narayan for the screen that was made into a film. It was released on 26 September 1947, and was accompanied in theatres by Cinema Kadhambam, the first animated film produced in South Indian cinema. Miss Malini was praised by intellectuals; Subbu's performance as Sampath was widely appreciated. The songs composed by S. Rajeswara Rao and Parur S. Anantharaman became popular, and the film gained cult status in Tamil cinema.

Miss Malini marked Narayan's earliest use of story elements that would recur in some of his later novels. It was later rewritten by him as the 1949 novel Mr. Sampath – The Printer of Malgudi, which in turn was adapted into the Hindi film Mr. Sampat (1952) directed by S. S. Vasan, and a 1972 Tamil film directed by Cho Ramaswamy. Although no print of Miss Malini is known to survive, thereby making it a lost film, surviving artefacts include its songs, along with a few stills and newspaper advertisements.

== Plot ==
Malini is an indigent woman whose father is in poor health. She is persuaded by her friend Sundari, an actress, to join her theatre company, Kala Mandhiram. Malini soon becomes very successful and popular as an actress. She is later befriended by Sampath, a charlatan, who is regularly involved in dodging creditors. Deaf to all advice, Malini allows herself to be led astray professionally, financially and morally by Sampath. She is put out of Kala Mandhiram and sets up a theatre company of her own where Sampath appoints himself as general manager. Malini severs ties with those who previously helped her, including Sundari. At first, the new company prospers, but its resources are soon squandered by Sampath and it falls under a weight of debt and disgrace. Sampath abandons Malini, who falls back to her previous destitute condition. However, with Sundari's help, she returns to Kala Mandhiram and begins her life anew.

== Cast ==
The cast is listed below:

- Pushpavalli as Malini
- Sundari Bai as Sundari
- Subbiah Pillai as Malini's father
- Kothamangalam Subbu as Sampath
- L. Narayana Rao as the sari merchant
- N. Seetharaman as the director
- R. G. as Kumar
- Varalakshmi as Nirmala
- Gopalakrishnan as the office boy

== Production ==
Two surviving stills from the film.

Miss Malini was an original story written by the novelist R. K. Narayan for the screen, not based on any of his past works. It was also his only work that came ended up being made into a film. (Note: Narayan wrote a story for Jupiter Pictures which was not produced. He also wrote a treatment for Gemini's Moondru Pillaigal (1952) and contributed to the script of Avvaiyar (1953), but Narayan's brother R. K. Ramachandran did not know "how much of his work Vasan used" for the latter.) Soon after the story developed, Narayan's friend, Gemini Studios' owner S. S. Vasan launched it as a film. K. Ramnoth, then the controller of productions at Gemini, produced the film under the studio's banner. M. Natarajan worked as the cinematographer, N. K. Gopal was the main editor, and the art director was A. K. Sekhar. Besides directing the film and writing the screenplay, Kothamangalam Subbu starred in a leading role as Sampath the charlatan, also known as "Bit Notice". It was his second directorial venture, after Kannamma En Kadhali (1945), also produced by Gemini Studios. Narayan's brother, R. K. Ramachandran, who did some editing on the film (marking his cinematic debut), believed that the character of Sampath was inspired by Sathashivayya, a man in Mysore who "exploited young women singers and artistes under the guise of promoting them".

The film featured Pushpavalli in the title role, and M. S. Sundari Bai as her friend Sundari. It was the former's second appearance in a Tamil film, after Gemini's Dasi Aparanji (1944). N. Seetharaman, who later became known as Javar Seetharaman, made his acting debut in a minor role with this film, portraying the director of Kala Mandhiram. The film also marked the cinematic debut of Ramaswamy Ganesan, who later became known as Gemini Ganesan. He was then working in Gemini's casting department, and Ramnoth, who had faith in Ganesan's acting prowess, cast him in the minor role of an assistant director employed by Seetharaman's character. In his only scene in the film, the assistant director tells the director, "Sir, Collection – Record Break", referring to the tickets having been sold out, to which the director replies that while the collection is "record break", in some time the theatre too would be "break" (broken) due to Malini having gone missing. Ganesan was credited onscreen as "R.G.", standing for "Ramaswamy Ganesan". This was the film where he met his future paramour Pushpavalli.

V. Gopalakrishnan, in one of his earliest film roles, appeared as Sampath's office boy. L. Narayana Rao was cast as a sari merchant who Sampath tells in English, "In this age of publicity, be wise and advertise!" and when the impressed merchant asks in Tamil who said it, Sampath simply replies "Shakespeare", duping the merchant in the process. According to the 1996 book R.K. Narayan: The Early Years by N. Ram and his wife Susan, the film was made on a shoestring budget of approximately ₹ 2,50,000. (Note: The exchange rate in 1947 was 3.3175 Indian rupees (₹) per 1 US dollar (US$).) Its final length was 13,924 feet (4,244 m).

== Themes ==
Miss Malini subtly ridiculed aspects of life in Madras (now Chennai) during the World War II period when there was a shortage of commodities and high prices. It included depictions of social mores, a love story, and the moral dilemmas its characters face pursuing business and personal interests. Film historian Randor Guy called the film a satire on South Indian society, it's wolves in sheep's clothing, frauds, social climbers and so on. According to the 2006 book Performing Pasts: Reinventing the Arts in Modern South India, the name "Bit Notice" was resonant of Subbu's own interests in the fields of theatre and cinema. Guy felt that the dialogue "Be wise and advertise!" reflected Vasan's personal beliefs.

R.K. Narayan: The Early Years stated that the film marked Narayan's earliest use of story elements that would recur in his later novels such as The Financial Expert, The Man-Eater of Malgudi and The Guide. These include the protagonist having humble beginnings before being lifted into a "totally new and unexpected situation," which brings fame and prosperity, the rise being invariably associated with an external player, who is a plausible person, of considerable force and no integrity. At the instigation of this character, the protagonist rises even higher, then engages in immoral actions causing their fall, and eventual return to their original position, but with a new philosophical perspective.

== Soundtrack ==
S. Rajeswara Rao and Carnatic musician Parur S. Anantharaman composed the film's soundtrack. Subbu was the lyricist for all of the songs except "Kaalaiyiley Ezhunthiruntha Kattayodey Azhuganam", which was written by Surabhi. T. V. Rathnam sang all of the songs except "Kulikkanum Kalikkanum" (sung by P. Leela), and "Kaalaiyiley" (sung by Sundari Bai).

"Mylapore Vakkeelathu" explores a young woman's ambition to marry a lawyer from the Mylapore district of Chennai – "Mylapore vakeelaathu mattupennaaven" ("I shall be a Mylapore lawyer's daughter-in-law"). It also reflects the trend that popular and wealthy people of that period lived in Mylapore, and highlights the association between Mylapore and lawyers. "Kaalaiyiley" ridicules India's ration system through the lyrics "Sarkaraikku queuevil poi saanjukittu nikkanum, sanda pottu patthu balam sakkata mann vaanganum" ("I have to stand in the queue for sugar, and after a lot of fighting, buy ten measures of gutter mud").

"Sri Saraswathi" is a partial variant of the Muthuswami Dikshitar composition of the same name. S. S. Vasan initially hired D. K. Pattammal to sing the song, picturised on Malini. However, Pattammal's recording was excluded from the final cut in favour of a version recorded by Rathnam. Vasan later told Randor Guy that Malini is an impoverished woman with no training in music when the song takes place, and cannot be expected to sing with the "class, perfection and brilliance" of Pattammal. As a result, he chose "a regular singer" to sing the song. "Paadum Radio" outlines the comfort of life in Madras with its electricity, radio and so on, but there is "counter in the same song which [emphasises] what city life is devoid of." The songs attained popularity, particularly "Mylapore Vakkeelathu", and "Kaalaiyiley". R.K. Narayan: The Early Years states that the songs "would be remembered long after the film ceased showing".

Tracks sorted alphabetically
No.	Title	Lyrics	Singer(s)	Length
1.	"Abayam Thanthu Arul Purivaiyam"	Kothamangalam Subbu	T. V. Rathnam	2:52
2.	"Jegame Oru Chiththira Salai"	Kothamangalam Subbu	T. V. Rathnam	3:15
3.	"Kaalaiyiley Ezhunthiruntha Kattayodey Azhuganam"	Surabhi	M. S. Sundari Bai	6:06
4.	"Kulikkanum Kalikkanum"	Kothamangalam Subbu	P. Leela	1:58
5.	"Mylapore Vakkeelathu"	Kothamangalam Subbu	T. V. Rathnam	2:24
6.	"Paadum Radio"	Kothamangalam Subbu	T. V. Rathnam	6:24
7.	"Senthamizh Nadu Sezhiththidave"	Kothamangalam Subbu	T. V. Rathnam	2:43
8.	"Sri Saraswathi"	Kothamangalam Subbu	T. V. Rathnam	3:24
Total length:				29:06

== Release ==
A scene from Cinema Kadambam, an animated short screened alongside Miss Malini. It was the first animated film produced in South India.

Miss Malini was released on 26 September 1947. An animated film of roughly 10 minutes, (Note: While film historian Randor Guy estimated the short to have run for "5 to 10 minutes", the 1992 book Films Division and the Indian Documentary by India's Ministry of Information and Broadcasting says it was 8 minutes long.) developed by cartoonist N. Thanu, titled Cinema Kadhambam, was screened after the interval of Miss Malini. Cinema Kadhambam, which featured caricatures of popular South Indian actors like Ranjan, Vasundhara, T. R. Ramachandran and P. Kannamba, was the first animated film produced in South Indian cinema.

=== Critical reception ===
Miss Malini was well received by intellectuals; critics praised Subbu's performance as Sampath. On 26 September 1947, the reviewer from The Hindu believed the technical aspects had made Miss Malini "Gemini's most outstanding achievement", concluding that the film was "of immense significance for the Indian screen." The Free Press Journal's review the same day similarly opined, "[Miss] Malini with its technical perfection, good photography and high level acting splashed by good music, and untainted by vulgarity will provide good entertainment." The following day, a review of Miss Malini from The Indian Express noted that it presented "a sort of skit on modern life" and termed it as "fine entertainment." The Tamil newspaper Swadesamitran's review described it as a "sample of the high production values Gemini is capable of introducing in a picture".

The critic from the Telugu newspaper Andhra Prabha said on 28 September, "Evidence of skillful expression of art is profusely manifest in this picture." On 3 October, the critic from The Mail praised the cast performances, the film's music, "enchanting pageantry" and Subbu's direction. A reviewer from another Tamil newspaper, Dinamani, believed the film to be "a pointer to social pictures in future" in their review dated 5 October. The critic from The Indian Review called Miss Malini an "attempt at a new kind of filmmaking with new technique. Eschewing cheap love-scenes and lewd expressions and gestures, the film yet keeps our interest intact."

=== Box office ===
According to Randor Guy, Miss Malini was not successful at the box-office, and it took a few years to recover its cost. He attributed the film's failure to its lack of commercial elements that would have helped it reach out to average filmgoers, the fact that it was ahead of its time, and wrote that Vasan lamented that "making films for intellectuals would not bring money"; Guy considered this a "lesson" he learnt from making the film. Guy also stated that Vasan would later often tell his friends that the film proved that Indian audiences "did not appreciate movies that tickled their intellect". Novelist and historian Venkatesh Ramakrishnan supported Guy's claim, saying the film "bombed at the box office".

In contrast, the 1985 book 70 Years of Indian Cinema, 1913–1983 says Miss Malini not only created box office records, but was also a trendsetter in Tamil cinema. V. Balakrishnan, writing for the magazine Ananda Vikatan in 2015, also stated that the film was a success. R.K. Narayan: The Early Years says that the film "paid for itself at the box office". Vasan's son S. S. Balan said the film "fared reasonably well". In April 1954, the magazine Gundoosi's column "Nunippul" (transl. Surface Grass) said that Ramnoth, not Subbu, was the main reason for the film's success.

== Legacy ==
Miss Malini attained cult status in Tamil cinema, and the character of Sampath became iconic. Sundari Bai's "nippy delivery" of her lines also attained popularity. Subbu became popularly known by his character's nickname "Bit Notice" after the film's release; children around Kapaleeshwarar Temple would scream "Bit Notice" when he passed by that area. Subbu's dialogue "Be wise and advertise!" also attained popularity. Music historian Vamanan noted in 2013 that politician M. P. Sivagnanam's enthusiasm for popularising the life of the Polygar chieftain Veerapandiya Kattabomman as a resistance fighter was derived initially from a line written by Subbu in a song from Miss Malini, which mentions Kattabomman along with Mahatma Gandhi and Subhas Chandra Bose ("Gandhi Mahaan, Netaji, Kattabomman kathai koori"). (Note: The claim by Vamanan does not identify the song by name.)

According to Ganesan's journalist daughter Narayani, his role in Miss Malini won him acclaim, and he soon received more acting offers. Guy noted that he went on to "blossom as one of the top stars of South Indian cinema". The film was later rewritten by Narayan as the 1949 novel Mr. Sampath – The Printer of Malgudi, which in turn was adapted into the Hindi film Mr. Sampat (1952) directed by Vasan, (Note: While Vasan's son S. S. Balan and Mr. Sampat's lead actress Padmini stated that the film was adapted from Miss Malini, a December 1952 article by The Times of India stated that it was "based on a popular story which appeared in serial form in The Illustrated Weekly of India some time ago".) and a 1972 Tamil film directed by Cho Ramaswamy. Although no print of Miss Malini is known to survive, which makes it a lost film, surviving artifacts include its songs, along with a few stills and newspaper advertisements.

== Bibliography ==
- Ganesh, Narayani (2011). Eternal Romantic: My Father Gemini Ganesan. Lustre Press. ISBN 978-81-7436-578-1.
- Ghosh, Abhijit (2013). 40 Retakes: Bollywood Classics You May Have Missed. Westland. ISBN 978-93-83260-31-7.
- Guy, Randor (1997). Starlight, Starbright: The Early Tamil Cinema. Amra Publishers. OCLC 52794531.
- Guy, Randor (2016). Memories of Madras: Its Movies, Musicians & Men of Letters. Creative Workshop. ISBN 978-81-928961-7-5.
- Narwekar, Sanjit (1992). Films Division and the Indian Documentary. India: Ministry of Information and Broadcasting. OCLC 29012317.
- Peterson, Indira Viswanathan; Soneji, Devesh (2008). Performing Pasts: Reinventing the Arts in Modern South India. Oxford University Press. ISBN 978-0-19-569084-2.
- Pillai, Swarnavel Eswaran (2015). Madras Studios: Narrative, Genre, and Ideology in Tamil Cinema. India: SAGE Publications. ISBN 978-93-5150-121-3.
- Rajadhyaksha, Ashish; Willemen, Paul (1998) [1994]. Encyclopaedia of Indian Cinema. British Film Institute and Oxford University Press. ISBN 0-19-563579-5.
- Ram, Susan; Ram, N. (1996). R.K. Narayan: The Early Years, 1906–1945. Viking. OCLC 889711654.
- Ramachandran, T. M.; Rukmini, S. (1985). 70 Years of Indian Cinema, 1913–1983. Cinema India-International. ISBN 978-0-86132-090-5.
- Usman, Yasser (29 August 2016). Rekha: The Untold Story. Juggernaut Books. ISBN 978-81-93284-18-6.
