= The Mahabharata (Narayan book) =

1978 book by R. K. Narayan

- First US edition
- Author: R.K. Narayan
- Original title: The Mahabharata: A Shortened Modern Prose Version of the Indian Epic
- Illustrator: R.K. Laxman
- Genre: Mythology
- Publisher: Heinemann (UK); Viking Press (US)
- Publication date: 1978
- Publication place: India
- Media type: Print
- Preceded by: The Painter of Signs
- Followed by: The Emerald Route

The Mahabharata: A Shortened Modern Prose Version of the Indian Epic is a mythological book by R. K. Narayan. It is a modernised, shortened, and translated retelling of The Mahabharata. It was first published by Heinemann in London, England, in 1978. The book was published as a result of a long endeavour that included three Hindu mythological works, Gods, Demons and Others, The Ramayana and finally The Mahabharata; in 1995, these works were republished as part of a new book, The Indian Epics Retold.

== Plot ==
Narayan's version of the Mahabharata focuses on the central conflict of the epic, the Kurukshetra War, while abridging many of the tangential stories-within-stories found in the original text. It begins with the ancestry of the central characters of the story, starting off with the life of King Santanu, the vow of Bhishma, the birth of the Pandavas and the Kauravas, and the tragic death of Pandu. The tale then follows the tutelage of the Pandavas by Drona, the burning of the house of lacquer, and the swayamvara of Draupadi.

From there, the story continues building toward the central war of the story, as Yudhisthira loses everything in the dice game, sending him and his brothers into years of exile in the forest, where they remain until tensions upon their return escalate into the great war. Narayan focuses the rest of his version of the Mahabharata on the Kurukshetra War (with the central dialogue between Arjuna and Krishna, the Bhagavad Gita, summarized into two pages), ending off with a swift post-war chapter and a two-to-three page epilogue.

== Development ==
In regards to his shortening of the Indian epic, Narayan stated: "I have omitted none of the episodes relevant to the destinies of the chief characters. I have kept myself to the mainstream and held my version within readable limits." On the subject of translation, Narayan noteD how an English version of the epic necessitates a process selection and condensation of the poetics into prose, as the "rhythm and depth" and the "hypnotic quality" of Sanskrit would inevitably be lost in translation. Though Narayan is knowledgeable of the scholarly research into the textual history of the Mahabharata (the evolution from a charioteer ballad into Jaya, and then Bharata, and finally the Mahabharata over the course of hundreds of years), Narayan chose to accept the traditional accounts of the narrative's origins, stating in his version's introduction: "The conclusions of cold, factual research seem like 'catching the rainbow with one's finger's', to quote a line from the epic itself."

American Indologist and author Wendy Doniger notes that although Narayan translated the epic from the Sanskrit version of the text, he still maintained the Tamil-style spelling of many of the character names (Kunthi instead of Kunti, Satyavathi instead of Satyavati, etc.). That being said, many of the epic's crucial points, such as the ambiguous nature of Krishna's divinity, follow the conventions of the Sanskrit text. Doniger states that Narayan "selects the precise details to keep the mortal/immortal tension in Krishna alive throughout the book."

== See also ==
- The Ramayana (Narayan book)
- Gods, Demons and Others
