= Reluctant Guru =

Book by R. K. Narayan

- First edition
- Author: R. K. Narayan
- Language: English
- Genre: Essays
- Publisher: Orient Paperbacks
- Publication date: 1974
- Publication place: India
- Media type: Print
- ISBN: 978-0-88253-729-0
- OCLC: 233801740
- Preceded by: The Ramayana
- Followed by: The Painter of Signs

Reluctant Guru is a book by R. K. Narayan published in 1974 by Orient Paperbacks. The book consists entirely of discursive essays, some of which were his weekly contributions to The Hindu. Some of the essays relate to the topic of his American stay, describing with his characteristic irony, the expectations of Americans that he would show them the key to the spiritual life of Indians. One criticism of the book is that the essays were too short and therefore lacking in depth.
