= The Emerald Route =

Travelogue by R. K. Narayan

- First commercial edition (1980)
- Author: R. K. Narayan
- Illustrator: R. K. Laxman
- Genre: Travel literature
- Publisher: Indian Thought Publications
- Publication date: 1977, 1980
- Publication place: India
- Media type: Print
- Pages: 115
- ISBN: 978-0-86578-075-0
- Preceded by: The Mahabharata
- Followed by: A Tiger for Malgudi

The Emerald Route is a travelogue by R. K. Narayan. It was published by Indian Thought Publications in 1980. It is a pseudo-travel guide for Karnataka, India. The book was commissioned by the Government of Karnataka, and the initial non-commercial version was published in 1977 as part of a government publication. The book is focused on local history, culture and heritage, and does not exhibit much of Narayan's characteristic personal narrative.
