= My Dateless Diary =

- First edition
- Author: R. K. Narayan
- Genre: Autobiographical essays
- Publisher: Indian Thought Publications
- Publication date: 1960
- Publication place: India
- Media type: Print
- ISBN: 978-0-14-010941-2
- OCLC: 20132905
- Dewey Decimal: 823 B 20
- LC Class: PR9499.3.N3 Z472 1988
- Preceded by: The Guide
- Followed by: The Man-Eater of Malgudi

My Dateless Diary is a collection of autobiographical essays by R. K. Narayan published in 1960. The book was the output of a daily journal that he maintained during his visit to the United States on a Rockefeller Fellowship in 1956. While on this visit, Narayan also completed The Guide, the writing of which is covered in this book. The book is focused on Narayan's interactions with the American people and the people themselves. The book also highlights Narayan's view of the west, his appreciation and admiration in general, but subtle disapproval of specific aspects while making it known that there isn't much of a gap between his values and those he has come across. The book offers insights into both, the author and his subjects.
