= The Grandmother's Tale and Selected Stories =

- First edition (US)
- Author: R. K. Narayan
- Illustrator: R. K. Laxman
- Language: English
- Publisher: Viking Press (US); Heinemann (UK)
- Publication date: 1994
- Publication place: India
- Media type: Print
- ISBN: 978-0-88001-624-7
- OCLC: 29877966
- Dewey Decimal: 823 21
- LC Class: PR9499.3.N3 G74 1999
- Preceded by: Grandmother's Tale

The Grandmother's Tale and Selected Stories is a book by R. K. Narayan with illustrations by his brother R. K. Laxman published in 1994 by Viking Press. The book includes a novella, Grandmother's Tale and some other stories in the characteristic Narayan style that captures suffering through comedic narratives. The book was a bestseller in the United States.
