= The Vendor of Sweets =

1967 novel by R. K. Narayan

- First US edition
- Author: R. K. Narayan
- Language: English
- Series: Malgudi Days
- Published: 1967 (Viking Press in US)

The Vendor of Sweets (1967), by R. K. Narayan, is the biography of a fictional character named Sri K. V. Jagan who is a sweet vendor of (a fictional Indian town) Malgudi. The story beautifully reflects his conflict with his estranged son and how he finally leaves for renunciation, overwhelmed by the sheer pressure and monotony of his life.

The novel was produced into Mithaivalla, part of the Hindi TV series, Malgudi Days, and was subsequently dubbed into English. The Vendor of Sweets tells about the relationship between a father and a son after the death of the mother.

Jagan is the protagonist of this novel. Mali is the son of Jagan. The major theme of this novel is the generational gap. As Jagan was a traditional one, he doesn't let Mali engage in things that were against the tradition and it creates conflict between both of them.

== Plot ==
Jagan is a 55-year-old sweetmeat vendor, a successful businessman, a vehement follower of Mahatma Gandhi and an honest, hardworking and humble resident of the fictional suburb of Malgudi in India. In his youth, he was influenced deeply by Mahatma Gandhi and left his studies and his peaceful life to become an active member in India's struggle for freedom from the British Empire. The Bhagavad Gita forms the staple of his life; he tries to act on the principles described in the Hindu Scripture. Naturopathy forms the pivotal of his life and he even desires to publish his natural way of living in the form of a book, but it becomes obvious that it is a futile dream as the draft has been gathering dust in the office of the local printer, Nataraj, for the last five years. Jagan wears hand spun cloth that signifies purity to him, and he has been commended for it by Gandhi himself. In his early days Jagan's wife, Ambika, dies from a brain tumor and leaves him to care for his only son, Mali.

Mali is gradually spoilt by Jagan and his almost 'maternal' obsession towards his son's life. Later, in his college days, Mali displays his deep dislike for education and says that he would like to be a 'writer', which Jagan at first interprets as a clerical occupation. Afterwards, Mali decides to leave to America to study Creative Writing. He gets his passport and tickets ready without even informing Jagan about his plans. In fact, Jagan used to conceal some part of his earnings to avoid the taxes. Mali takes the money from his father's hidden treasure to fulfill his expenditures. Eventually it becomes known to Jagan. But, he accepts this diversion with good heart and treasures every letter received from Mali and proudly exhibits it to anyone whom he met in his daily activities. A few years later, Mali returns to Malgudi very Westernized and brings along a half-American, half-Korean girl, Grace, whom Mali claims is his 'wife'. Jagan assumes that they are married according to the social norms and standards, but also realizes that Mali's relationship with him has further eroded. However, Jagan develops an affection for Grace and feels that Mali is not giving her the attention she deserves.

Soon Mali expresses his grandiose scheme of starting a story-writing machine factory with the association of some anonymous business partners from America. He asks his father to invest in this factory, but Jagan is unwilling to provide the financial infrastructure of this venture, which causes more friction between Jagan and Mali. Troubled by this turmoil, Jagan decides to retire from active working. Through an unexpected meeting with the top businessmen of the region, Jagan comes across the 'bearded man', a rather eccentric hairdryer whose eloquence makes Jagan contemplate on his dull and monotonous life. He starts to develop a desire to have renunciation from his life, and suddenly falls into a recollection of his happy past with his family and his wife, which further strengthens his need for reconciliation. As this happens, Mali is caught by the police for driving under the influence of alcohol and deserts his wife. Jagan then tells his cousin that 'a dose of prison life is not a bad thing' for Mali, so that he can learn his mistakes and be a better person in the future. However Jagan writes a cheque to the cousin so that he can pay the preliminary fees of Mali's bail, and asks the cousin to inform him if Grace needs to go back to her motherland, so that Jagan can buy her the plane ticket.

== Main characters ==
- Jagan: The protagonist. A follower of Gandhi in his youth, he works as a sweetmeat vendor by profession. The novel portrays him as a typical Homo Narayans; Jagan is a timid man, not notably wealthy or poverty-stricken, and yearns to spend life with the least troubles. He appears to be an extremely orthodox and peaceful man. His only son is the pearl of his eye. Occasionally, Jagan exploits religion and his Gandhian principles to save himself from his mental agitations and Mali's various attempts at bulldozing his peace and hates European culture. This is all about the character of Jagan..
- Mali: Jagan's son. An ambitious young man, spoilt by his father, he has a strong repugnance towards the educational system of India, and desires for more modern prospects of business. He blames his father for his mother's death. After studying Creative Writing in America, he comes back to his hometown and tries to "modernize" it.
- The cousin : The 'man-about-town', he claims his cousinhood with everyone in Malgudi. He proves to be helpful in creating a communicative bridge between Jagan and Mali. He is quite an affable character who displays appreciation of Jagan's simple Gandhian lifestyle and simultaneously gets on well with Mali and his various modern notions. Close criticism may prove him to be an ambitious, calculating man with the intention of gaining the control of Jagan's business, which he does eventually at the end of the story.He creates humour and hypocrisy in the plot.
- Grace: A half-American, half-Korean girl whom Mali brings home, claiming that she is the latter's wife. She works like a catalyst between the two conflicting cultures, and tries to integrate into the Indian culture she has entered into, but results only in strengthening the cultural difference.

== Analysis ==
The novel is predominantly about the relationship between father and son. Jagan – whose wife died when their son was a young boy – constantly tries to bond with his son, but fails badly due to his own backwardness in communication.

Another major theme expressed in this book is the clash of the Indian and western cultures. Jagan lives in Malgudi and follows the Indian culture and traditions. On the other hand, Mali comes to India completely influenced by the western culture.

Another theme is Jagan's deep connection to his tradition and culture which is highlighted throughout the novel and this also influences Mali.

== Summary ==
'Chapter-1 At the beginning of the chapter 1, we learn that Jagan is a very religious person who offers prayers to Lakshmi every morning. He lives by the adage 'Conquer taste, and you will have conquered the self.' When Jagan's cousin questions his faith in the maxim, Jagan merely states that he is only following the advice of sages.

Jagan is the vendor of sweets. He owns a sweet mart where sweetmeats are prepared and sold to the customers. The writer employs both visual and olfactory imagery to depict the scene of Jagan's religious activities performed in the morning with the scent of jasmine flowers and the incense sticks. Even the scent of the sweetmeats frying in ghee spreads all around.(This chapter is about Jagan and his background)

'Chapter-2(This chapter depicts the information about the city Malgudi)

== Literary Review ==
The novel is composed in simple English – to such an extent that a young school child's vocabulary will be able to comprehend the sense of the tale.

Narayan's skill of writing that allows him to use English to breathe life into his stories with ease can be easily found in this novel. Although Narayan's native language was Tamil (the language of the south Indian state of Tamil Nadu), he utilized English in such a way that allowed his readers to step into the streets of Malgudi, and allowed them to feel the same aromas, the same, bright Indian sunlight and the same feelings of his characters.
