= Grandmother's Tale =

1992 novella by R. K. Narayan

- First edition
- Author: R. K. Narayan
- Illustrator: R. K. Laxman
- Language: English
- Genre: Novella
- Publisher: Indian Thought Publications
- Publication date: 1992
- Publication place: India
- Media type: Print
- ISBN: 81-85986-15-0
- Preceded by: The World of Nagaraj

Grandmother's Tale is a novella by R. K. Narayan with illustrations by his brother R. K. Laxman published in 1992 by Indian Thought Publications. It was subsequently released outside India as The Grandmother's Tale by Heinemann in 1993. This book, more than any others, exhibits Narayan's experimental tendencies. The book is about Narayan's great grandmother who is forced to travel far and wide in search of her husband, as narrated to him by his grandmother.
