= The Dark Room (Narayan novel) =

1938 novel by R.K.Narayan

- Early Indian edition
- Author: R.K.Narayan
- Language: English
- Publication date: 1938
- Publication place: India
- Media type: Print
- Pages: 214
- ISBN: 978-0-226-56837-9
- OCLC: 7172688
- Dewey Decimal: 823 19
- LC Class: PR9499.3.N3 D37 1981
- Preceded by: The Bachelor of Arts
- Followed by: Malgudi Days

The Dark Room is a novel written by R.K.Narayan, the well-known English-language novelist from India. Like most of his other works, this is a tale set in the fictitious town of Malgudi.

This work of literature was first published in Great Britain in 1938 by Macmillan & Co., Ltd. London. The first Indian edition came out in 1956.

== Story review ==
Savitri is a submissive wife who listens to all the harsh abuses sent out to her by her husband Ramani. Ramani works for the elite Engladia Insurance Company and will do anything to satisfy his bosses.

Savitri has three children Kamala, Babu and Sumati. Savitri would flee to her dark room when she could not tolerate the pangs of intolerance and maltreatment meted out to her unfairly. She discovers sadly that her husband is having an affair with another woman. Her husband even takes her favorite bench so that he can use it to decorate the other woman's house. Her husband seems more interested in flattering and pleasing the other woman. A simpleton like Savitri has nowhere to go. She tries to drown herself but she gets saved. She works as a temple custodian. She can fend for herself but she has her past life also. She cannot forget the bleak look on her children's faces when she abandoned them, much to their shock.

== Release details ==
- 1938, UK, Macmillan Publishers ISBN ?, Pub date ? ? 1938, hardback (first edition)
- 1990, UK, Mandarin ISBN ?, Pub date ? ? 1990, paperback
- 1994, UK, Minerva ISBN ?, Pub date ? ? 1994, paperback
- 1994, US, University of Chicago Press ISBN 0-226-56837-7, Pub date 1 September 1994, paperback
- 2005, UK, Indian Thought Publications ISBN 81-85986-02-9, Pub date ? ? 2005, paperback reissue
