= Malgudi Days =

Malgudi Days may refer to:

- Malgudi Days (short story collection), a collection by R. K. Narayan
- Malgudi Days (TV series), an Indian television series based Narayan's work
- Maalgudi Days, a 2016 Indian Malayalam film
- Malgudi Days (2020 film), a 2020 Indian Kannada-language film
