= Gods, Demons and Others =

1964 collection of short stories by R. K. Narayan

- First edition (UK)
- Author: R. K. Narayan
- Language: English
- Publisher: Heinemann (UK); Viking Press (US)
- Publication date: 1964
- Publication place: India
- Media type: Print
- OCLC: 16080878
- Preceded by: A Tiger for Malgudi
- Followed by: The Ramayana

Gods, Demons and Others is a collection of short stories by R. K. Narayan adapted from Indian history and mythology, including epics like The Ramayana and Mahābhārata. In this book, Narayan provides both vitality and an original viewpoint to ancient legends.

== Introduction ==
Gods, Demons and Others is a collection of ancient tales from India's complex history and mythology presented in their traditional setting, albeit with Narayan's urbane and affectionate, satirical style, bereft of any didactic interludes. The selection of stories includes only those that center on outstanding personalities who transcend the boundaries of time and age. The book consists of 15 stories.

== Book outline ==
Lavana

The story of Lavana, a king on a spiritual journey (not the asura mentioned in the Ramayana that is different).

Chudala

The story of a king trying to attain self-realisation.

Yayati

The story of Yayati, an asura king.

Devi

The story of the Goddess Devi, responsible for all, in Hindu mythology.

Viswamitra

Story of Viswamitra, one of the most revered rishis of ancient India, who attains enormous power but stays unsatisfied until he realizes that the power should not be used for self-gratification.

Manmata

Story of Manmata, the god of love

Ravana

Story of the asura king Ravana, Rama's nemesis in the Ramayana.

Valmiki

Story of Adi Kavi Valmiki, the author of the Ramayana who is said to have discovered the first śloka that set the base for Sanskrit poetry.

Draupadi

Story of Draupadi, the wife of the Pandavas in the Mahabharatha.

Nala

The story of how Nala a pure and righteous king is corrupted by a demon and thereby separated from his wife Damayanti. Nala subsequently overcomes all obstacles and is reunited with his kingdom and wife.

Savitri

The story of Savitri from Markandeya's narrative within the Mahabharatha.

The Mispaired Anklet

Story of Kannagi from the Tamil epic Silappathigaram. Kannagi is eulogized by that Tamil community for her purity and devotion to her husband.

Shakuntala

Story of Shakuntala the daughter of Viswamitra and wife of Dushyanta, the founder of the Paurav dynasty.

Harishchandra

Story of Harishchandra, the legendary Indian king.

Sibi

Story of the Chola king, Sibi Chakravarthy, who promises refuge to a dove and then sacrifices a part of his right thigh to a hawk, in return for the safety of the dove.
