= Under the Banyan Tree and Other Stories =

Short story collection by R. K. Narayan

- First edition (US)
- Author: R. K. Narayan
- Language: English
- Publisher: Heinemann (UK); Viking Press (US)
- Media type: Print (paperback)
- Pages: 193
- ISBN: 9780670804528

Under the Banyan Tree and Other Stories is a collection of short stories by R. K. Narayan, set in and around the fictitious town of Malgudi in South India published in 1985. The stories range from the humorous to the serious and all are filled with Narayan's acute observations of human nature. The concluding titular story, "Under the Banyan Tree", is about a village story-teller who concludes his career by taking a vow of silence for the rest of his life, realizing that a story-teller must have the sense to know when to stop and not wait for others to tell him.

This is the title story of this collection of tales by R.K. Narayan. It concludes the collection with the story of a simple village in South India called Somal, where an aged storyteller named Nambi lived. Nambi seems to resemble R.K. Narayan, especially in relation to R.K. Narayan during his later career. Nambi, like R.K. Narayan, was getting older as the years went by, as mentioned in the short story titled ‘Under the Banyan Tree’. However, every new moon or at least twice a month, he used to entertain the simple village people of Somal with grandiose tales which he narrated to them under a banyan tree in front of the temple of the Mother goddess Ma Durga or Shakti where he resided at that time, but no one really knew how old he was or how he landed up being the storyteller of Somal. Yet, every time a lighted lamp was placed in the niche of the banyan tree, the villagers all knew that Nambi had a story to tell and would gather to listen to his tales of kings, palaces, fantastic adventures, villains, and moralistic endings. One day after many years of entertaining the villagers, Nambi begins a story but cannot continue with it for more than a few minutes. He stutters, hesitates, and recedes into a sort of uncomfortable silence. One by one, the villagers leave the banyan tree to the dismay of Nambi. He is afraid that the goddess has taken away his power. So, he meditates upon her the whole of the next day and once again begins the story in public. However, he stumbles again, cannot form the words in his mouth, and recedes into another silence. As the days pass, this hesitancy and silence in telling a tale due to Nambi’s old age worsens. Finally, one day, he calls all the villagers to the banyan tree to tell them a wonderful story. The villagers assume that their old storyteller has, at last, got his powers of eloquent speech back and returned to their places under the banyan tree that night. To their shock, the storyteller tells them once they settle down that, that was the last day he was going to speak as he had lost his power of storytelling. He takes it in his stride, saying that nothing was truly his, everything was the goddess; when she had something to say through him, he spoke; when she had nothing more to say, he was silent. He then spends the rest of his remaining life till he dies in one great long silence.

== Critical reception ==
Kirkus Reviews, in its review of the story collection, wrote that the stories were "told with cleverness and wry humor--which make a refreshing change from a more familiar sort of reading fare."
