= Banker Margayya =

- Directed by: T. S. Nagabharana
- Written by: R. K. Narayan
- Screenplay by: T. S. Nagabharana
- Based on: The Financial Expert by R. K. Narayan
- Produced by: T. S. Narasimhan; B. S. Somasundar
- Starring: Lokesh; Jayanthi; Sundar Raj; Sundar Krishna Urs; Musuri Krishnamurthy; Master Manjunath
- Cinematography: S. Ramachandra
- Edited by: Suresh Urs
- Music by: Vijaya Bhaskar
- Release date: 30 April 1983
- Running time: 139 minutes
- Country: India
- Language: Kannada

Banker Margayya is 1983 Indian Kannada-language film directed by T. S. Nagabharana, based on the novel The Financial Expert by R. K. Narayan, and starring Lokesh in the lead role.

The film won the National Film Award for Best Feature Film in Kannada in 1984 and at the 1983–84 Karnataka State Film Awards, Lokesh was awarded the Best actor.

== Plot ==
Bad culture drives out good culture. Bad money drives out good money. But here, quick money itself, acquired by a miser, though initially boosts his image in the society gradually makes him understand that human values are more important than money.

The film is derived from R. K. Narayan's novel The Financial Expert, another of his works set in Malgudi. Margayya is a smart money-lender who, by advising villagers about the rules of borrowing money, sends corrupt bank officials running scared. By a quirk of fate he loses this upper hand. He tries odd jobs to beat poverty but it takes another quirk of fate for his life to change. As with a lot of Narayan's works, the sum total of joy and despair might end up at zero, but the experience is always up in the positives.

An ironic morality tale about an entrepreneur whose endeavours are constantly ruined by his son. Margayya (Lokesh) starts out as a moneylender sitting under a banyan tree opposite a co-operative bank, filling in forms, and offering advice to the villagers of Narayan's fictional village of Malgudi, usually on how to circumvent the bank's bureaucratic process of offering loans. His career as a banker is ruined when his son Balu (master manjunath) throws away all the account books in gutter. Then Margayya publishes a sex manual with its author, a Dr. Pal (Urs). The venture is very profitable. But balu life was spoiled by reading this book, so he stops publishing these sex books. Then with the help of Dr. Pal he starts a bank of his own thus becomes banker Margayya. Margayya becomes wealthier than all the banks in the area. But Balu is the victim of the salacious book and starts visiting prostitute with Dr. Pal. Once balu was caught by his father when he was in illegal activity along with Dr. Pal, angry Margayya thrashes Dr. Pal black and blue. The insulted Dr. Pal spoils all of Margayya's business and Margayya has to start all over again under his banyan tree, with the threatening but beloved presence of his grandson by his side.

== Cast ==
- Lokesh as Banker Margayya
- Jayanthi
- Sundar Raj as balu
- Vijayaranjini
- Sundar Krishna Urs as Dr.Pal
- Musuri Krishnamurthy
- Master Manjunath as younger balu
- Pramila Joshai

== Soundtrack ==
Anveshane

Soundtrack album to Anveshane by Vijaya Bhaskar
- Language: Kannada
- Label: Sangeetha

The music of the film was composed by Vijaya Bhaskar

| No. | Song | Singers | Lyricist |
|---|---|---|---|
| 1 | "Naatya Gaana Manaranjane" | Vani Jairam | Vijaya Narasimha |
| 2 | "Balu Mojina Ee Youvana" | Vani Jairam | Vijaya Narasimha |

== Awards and honors ==
- This movie was selected for Indian Panorama.
- National Film Awards 1983 - Best Kannada Film
- Karnataka State Film Awards 1983-84 - Best Actor - Lokesh
