= Mr. Sampath (1972 film) =

1972 film by Cho Ramaswamy

- Title card
- Directed by: Cho
- Screenplay by: Cho
- Based on: Mr. Sampath – The Printer of Malgudi by R. K. Narayan
- Produced by: A. Sunderam
- Starring: Muthuraman; Sundarrajan; Cho
- Music by: M. S. Viswanathan
- Production company: Vivek Chitra Films
- Release date: 13 April 1972
- Running time: 145 minutes
- Country: India
- Language: Tamil

Mr. Sampath (/səmpəθ/) is a 1972 Indian Tamil-language satirical film written and directed by Cho, who also portrays the title character. It is based on the R. K. Narayan novel Mr. Sampath – The Printer of Malgudi (1949). The film features an ensemble cast led by Muthuraman, and has music composed by M. S. Viswanathan. It was released on 13 April 1972.

== Plot ==
Born into poverty, Sampath has a heart of gold. Though clever and wise, he wants to become rich without hard work. He pretends to be a rich film producer. He ultimately realises that one cannot cheat people all the time.

== Cast ==
- Muthuraman
- Sundarrajan
- Cho as Sampath
- Vennira Aadai Moorthy
- Mali
- Poornam Viswanathan
- Neelu
- Jaya
- Manorama
- Sukumari

== Production ==
Mr. Sampath is based on the novel Mr. Sampath – The Printer of Malgudi by R. K. Narayan. The film adaptation was produced by A. Sunderam under Vivek Chitra Films, and filmed in black and white. Besides directing, Cho Ramaswamy also starred, and wrote the screenplay. The final length was 3,953.59 metres (12,971.1 ft).

== Soundtrack ==
The music was composed by M. S. Viswanathan, while the lyrics were written by Vaali.

Track listing
No.	Title	Singer(s)	Length
1.	"Aarambam Yaridam"	S. P. Balasubrahmanyam, P. Susheela
2.	"Anbana Rasikan"	L. R. Eswari
3.	"Alangaram Pothumadi"	T. M. Soundararajan, Manorama
4.	"Hare Rama Hare Krishna"	M. S. Viswanathan
