= Next Sunday =

- First edition
- Author: R. K. Narayan
- Genre: Essays
- Publisher: Pearl Publications
- Publication date: 1960
- Publication place: India
- Media type: Print
- OCLC: 1308930

Next Sunday is a collection of weekly essays by R. K. Narayan published in 1960. The book provides insights into Narayan's writings and perspectives and the protagonists of his works - the middle class common man. The book also includes his reflections on the themes of and actions in his novels and short stories.
