= Waiting for the Mahatma =

1955 novel by R. K. Narayan

- First edition
- Author: R. K. Narayan
- Language: English
- Publisher: Michigan State University Press
- Publication date: 1955
- Publication place: India
- Media type: Print (Hardback & Paperback)
- Pages: 241
- OCLC: 607661305

Waiting for the Mahatma is a 1955 novel by R. K. Narayan.

== Plot summary ==
Sriram is a high school graduate who lives with his grandmother in Malgudi, the fictional Southern Indian town in which much of Narayan's fiction takes place. Sriram is attracted to Bharati, a girl of his age who is active in Mahatma Gandhi's Quit India movement, and he becomes an activist himself. He then gets involved with anti-British extremists, causing much grief to his grandmother. Sriram's underground activity takes place in the countryside, an area alien to him, and the misunderstandings with the locals provide the book's best comic moments. After spending some time in jail, Sriram is reunited with Bharati, and the story ends with their engagement amidst the tragedy of India's partition in 1947 and Gandhi's death in 1948.

Waiting for the Mahatma is written in Narayan's gentle comic style. An unusual feature of this novel is the participation of Gandhi as a character. His revolutionary ideas and practices are contrasted with the views of traditionalists such as the town's notables and Sriram's grandmother. This note of ambivalence towards the freedom movement may be due to Narayan's needing to reassure his mainly British audience. The political struggle serves as a background to Sriram and Bharati's unconventional romance which is concluded outside either's family circle. This is one of Narayan's most successful novels, where much happens behind the facade of the low key storytelling.

== See also ==
- List of artistic depictions of Mahatma Gandhi
