= The Ramayana (Narayan book) =

- First edition
- Author: R.K. Narayan
- Language: English
- Genre: Mythology
- Publisher: Chatto and Windus
- Publication date: 1972
- Publication place: India
- Media type: Print
- ISBN: 978-0-14-004428-7
- OCLC: 2798190
- Preceded by: My Days
- Followed by: The Painter of Signs

The Ramayana is a mythological book by R. K. Narayan. It was first published by Chatto and Windus, London in 1972. The book is a shortened, prose adaptation of the Tamil Kamba Ramayanam. In 1938, Narayan made a promise to his dying uncle that he would translate the Kamba Ramayana to English, however, he did not think about this promise until 1968 when he began work on this effort. He later wrote The Mahabharata, published in 1978.
