= Mr. Sampat =

1952 film by S. S. Vasan

- Film poster
- Directed by: S. S. Vasan
- Written by: J. S. Casshyap (dialogues)
- Screenplay by: Gemini Story Dept. Kothamangalam Subbu; Ki. Ra.
- Story by: R. K. Narayan
- Produced by: S. S. Vasan; M. A. Partha Sarathy
- Starring: Motilal; Padmini
- Cinematography: P. Ellappa
- Edited by: Chandru
- Music by: E. Shankar Shastri; B. S. Kalla
- Production company: Gemini Studios
- Release date: 25 December 1952
- Running time: 165 minutes
- Country: India
- Language: Hindi

Mr. Sampat (/səmpəθ/) is a 1952 Indian Hindi-language satirical film produced and directed by S. S. Vasan of Gemini Studios. It is based on R. K. Narayan's 1949 novel Mr. Sampath – The Printer of Malgudi, and the Tamil film Miss Malini (1947). The film revolves around the titular con artist (Motilal) who manipulates an actress (Padmini) and a merchant (Kanhaiyalal) for his own benefits.

Mr. Sampat was released on 25 December 1952. Although Motilal received rave reviews for his performance, the film was a commercial failure.

== Plot ==
Sampat is a con artist. Since the city of Bombay loves theatre actress Malini of the Kala Mandir Company, he plots and concocts an elaborate scheme involving her and Seth Makhanlal, a ghee merchant. He uses Malini, helps Makhanlal win the local elections, then has them involved in opening a bank by offering customers higher interest. The deposits are high. At Sampat's persuasion, Malini starts her own theatre company, but this comes at the cost of her leaving the Kala Mandir Company. While Sampat has a good life, a maharaja, who had huge deposits with the bank, withdraws his funds when Malini rejects his advances. In a matter of time, all of Sampat's schemes fail and both Makhanlal and Malini lose large amounts of money. Realising that he does not have anything more to gain, Sampat abandons them and goes off to explore new zones, this time in the guise of a godman.

== Cast ==
Adapted from the opening credits:

- Motilal as Sampat
- Padmini as Malini
- Vanaja as Sundari
- Sundari Bai as Nirmala
- Swaraj as Director
- Agha as Hotel Proprietor
- Kanhaiyalal as Seth Makhanlal
- Badri Prasad as Malini's Father
- Kailashnath as Raj Mohan
- J. S. Casshyap as Secretary
- Narendra Kumar as Sampat's Servant
- Kadam as Assistant Director
- Kamal Krishna as Indra
- B. S. Kalla as Bhagavathar – Surdas
- Mukherjee as Communist Leader
- G. V. Sharma as Rickshaw-Wallah
- Shyam as Art Critic
- Bagga as Congress Leader
- Lallubhai as Beggar
- Khanna as Congress Leader's friend
- Ishwarlal as Narada
- T. S. B. Rao as Brihaspathi
- Ramamurthi as Viswamitra
- Revathi as Surdas's Wife
- Bannerji as Contractor
- Vijaya Rao as Tank Watchman
- L. R. Mudaliar as Kavi
- Kaushal as Bailiff
- Sultan as Durwan
- Raghupathi Rao as Raj Mohan's A.D.C
- Bhat as Ticket Examiner
- Sudhindra as Newspaper Boy
- Gemini Girls and Boys

== Production ==
Mr. Sampat is based on the 1949 novel Mr. Sampath – The Printer of Malgudi by R. K. Narayan, and the Tamil film Miss Malini (1947) from which the novel developed. It was produced and directed by S. S. Vasan of Gemini Studios. The film was made on a shoestring budget, unlike Vasan's earlier directorial venture, the blockbuster Chandralekha (1948). Vasan showed Motilal two reels of Miss Malini, but Motilal felt it was "slow" and complained that it gave him "a headache". He then gave Vasan a sample of his own interpretation of the character Sampat and proceeded to play it that way. Motilal played Sampat as someone who just wants to live life as he wants, "not as an extraordinary person, but precisely as an ordinary person".

The film substantially deviated from the novel, with Vasan making it "a broad burlesque film and using it successfully to lampoon politicians, ex-princes, journalists, filmstars, religious zealots and bogus philanthropists." Padmini was chosen to reprise the role of Malini, originally played by Pushpavalli in Tamil, and Mr. Sampat marked her first major appearance in a Hindi film. The screenplay was written by Gemini's Story Department, headed by Kothamangalam Subbu. Cinematography was handled by P. Ellappa, and the editing by Chandru. Principal photography took place entirely at Gemini Studios. The final cut of the film was 14,276 metres (46,837 ft), equivalent to 165 minutes.

== Soundtrack ==
The music of the film was composed by E. Shankar Shastri and B. S. Kalla. The lyrics were written by Pandit Indra. It also marked P. B. Sreenivas' debut in playback singing. The film had no romantic duet, no bhajan, no rakhi song and no heartbreak track, all of which were considered "essential ingredients" in 1950s Indian cinema. The song "Laila Laila Pukaroon" is picturised on a play based on Layla and Majnun. The song "Acche Din Aa Rahe" is picturised on Malini declaring that achche din (good days) will never come for the poor because "the rich and the powerful will never let that happen." Historian V. Sriram noted similarities between "Aao Aao Kahani Suno" and the song "Ayirathu Thollayirathu Ambadu Aruvadu Natakam" from Manamagal (1951).

No.	Title	Singer(s)	Length
1.	"Aao Aao Kahani Suno"	Geeta Dutt, Jikki	4:37
2.	"Acche Din Aa Rahe"	Shamshad Begum, M. L. Vasanthakumari	1:28
3.	"Aji Hum Bharat Ki"	Geeta Dutt, P. B. Sreenivas	4:54
4.	"Chalo Paniya Bharan"	Geeta Dutt, Jikki	1:44
5.	"Devendra Dev Ki Jay"	Talat Mahmood, Shamshad Begum	4:10
6.	"Din Control Ke"	Geeta Dutt, Jikki	5:24
7.	"Hindustan Hamara"	Geeta Dutt	3:24
8.	"Jagah Nahi"	P. B. Sreenivas, Geeta Dutt
9.	"Khabardar Hoshiyar"	Shamshad Begum
10.	"Kyon Janam Diya"	Shamshad Begum, Talat Mahmood
11.	"Laila Laila Pukaroon"	Shamshad Begum, Talat Mahmood	3:42
12.	"Yeh Lo Mai Layi"	Shamshad Begum, P. B. Sreenivas	4:17
13.	"Lo Lai Suiyan"	Shamshad Begum
14.	"O Bairagi Banwasi"	Geeta Dutt	2:41
15.	"Manchi Dinamu Nede"	M. L. Vasanthakumari	1:35
16.	"Hey Bhagwan Kyo"	Talat Mahmood	1:19
17.	"Maharani Hamari Aayi Re"	Shamshad Begum	1:42

== Release and reception ==
Mr. Sampat was released on 25 December 1952. Although Motilal received rave reviews for his performance, the film was a commercial failure. In a review dated 4 January 1953, The Times of India said, the film "marks a new departure in the policy and principle of our filmmakers, who have been ruled hitherto by box-office considerations with rare, too rare, exceptions. In Mr Sampat, Vasan has given us our very first picture which can be said to hold the mirror up to life with useful purpose and an immediate lesson aimed at stimulating the tardy growth and quickening the critical faculty among audiences... Mr Motilal gives a superb performance... he is a grand actor with a slick art which nobody on the screen today can rival." Babu Rao Patel, then the editor of Filmindia, also reviewed the film positively, praising the satire and morals in the film. Rati Batra of the magazine Thought wrote on 10 January 1953, "Motilal as Mr Sampat lives upto the character perfectly, and, though he gets all the laughs, he never borders on the clownish." She also praised the performance of Padmini as Malini but criticised the photography, noting that the shots of the stage shows seen in the film suffered from "bad lighting". J. D. S. of the same magazine also praised the film, thanking Gemini for "presenting to our film industry a model in the portrayal of modern social and political themes." He concluded that, despite a few minor objections, Mr. Sampat was a "shining example of film art amidst the morass of mediocrity that is the experience of the Indian cinegoer."

Mr. Sampat was later featured in journalist Avijit Ghosh's 2013 book 40 Retakes: Bollywood Classics You May Have Missed. Ghosh wrote in that book that the film's "post-mortem of corruption feels cool and contemporary even today" and that Motilal gave "the performance of a lifetime" as Sampat.

== Dropped sequel ==
After the completion of Mr. Sampat, Motilal suggested a sequel titled Mr. Sampat Goes to the UNO to Vasan, but it never came to fruition.

== Bibliography ==
- Ghosh, Avijit (2013). 40 Retakes: Bollywood Classics You May Have Missed. Tranquebar Press. ISBN 978-93-83260-31-7.
- Rajadhyaksha, Ashish; Willemen, Paul (1998) [1994]. Encyclopaedia of Indian Cinema. British Film Institute and Oxford University Press. ISBN 0-19-563579-5.
