= The World of Nagaraj =

1990 novel by R. K. Narayan

The World of Nagaraj by R. K. Narayan
- Cover of the first edition
- Author: R. K. Narayan
- Language: English
- Genre: Novel
- Publication date: 1990
- Publication place: India
- Media type: Print (hardback & paperback)
- Preceded by: A Writer's Nightmare
- Followed by: The World of Malgudi

The World of Nagaraj (1990) is a classic piece of literature by R. K. Narayan. It is based in Malgudi, a fictional small town in South India.

== Plot summary ==
Nagaraj's world is comfortable. Living in his family's spacious house with only his wife, Sita, and his widowed mother for company, he fills his day writing letters, drinking coffee, book-keeping for his friend Coomar's Boeing Sari Company, and sitting on his verandah, planning the book he intends to write about the life of the sage Narada.

But everything is disturbed when Tim, the son of his ambitious land-owning brother Gopu, decides to leave home and come to live with Nagaraj. Forced to take responsibility for the boy, puzzled by his secret late-night activities and by the strong smell of spirits which lingers behind him, Nagaraj finds his days suddenly filled with unwelcome complication and turbulence, which threaten to forever alter the contented tranquility of his world.

== Characters ==
Nagaraj: A mild mannered man belonging to a wealthy aristocratic family based in Kabir Street. Bereft of any children himself, he develops a fondness for his elder brother's son, christened Krishnaji, but generally known as Tim. He leads a tranquil life in his ancestral house and nurses grandiloquent plans to write a book on the life of the Sage Narada.

Sita: Nagaraj's wife, sometimes seems very sharp and farsighted.

Gopu: Nagaraj's elder brother, ambitious, and always self-centered man.

Other characters include -

Jayaraj, the photographer, whose shop is located at the Market archway. He sleeps on a wooden bench in front of his shop because he feels his camera lens might get stolen and is woken up by Nagaraj every day.

Kanni the Paan-wala, the old absent minded priest.

Bari the stationery owner and the drunkard engineer.

The Talkative Man.
