= The Financial Expert =

Novel by R.K. Narayan

- First UK edition
- Author: R. K. Narayan
- Language: English
- Publisher: Methuen (UK)
- Publication date: 1952
- Publication place: India
- Media type: Print
- Preceded by: Mr. Sampath - The Printer of Malgudi
- Followed by: Waiting for the Mahatma

The Financial Expert is a 1952 novel by R. K. Narayan. It takes place, as do many other novels and short stories by this author, in the town of Malgudi. The central character in this book is the financial expert Margayya, who offers advice to his fellow townspeople from under his position at the banyan tree. He is a man of many aspirations and this novel delves into some level of psychological analysis. The Financial Expert tells the story of the rise and fall of Margayya.

The theme of the novel is lust for money. But Margayya is no monster of greed and wickedness. In his depiction of Margayya, Narayan humanises him and shows that despite his lust for money, he is still a human being.

== Plot ==
The protagonist of the novel, Margayya begins his career as a petty money-lender doing his business under the Banyan tree, in front of the Central Co-operative Land Mortgage Bank in Malgudi. He helps the shareholders of the bank to borrow money at a small interest and lends it to the needy at a higher interest. In the process, he makes money for himself.

The Secretary of the Bank and Arul Doss, the peon, seize from his box the loan application forms he has managed to get from the Bank through its shareholders; they treat him with contempt and threaten to proceed against him. This sets the path to improving his position.

Balu, his spoilt-child throws his account book, containing all the entries of his transactions with his clients into the gutter, and it becomes impossible for Margayya to resume his old practice. He shows his horoscope to an astrologer and is assured that good times will come for him if he offers puja to Lakshmi, the Goddess of Wealth. The puja is done for forty days, with ash from a red lotus and ghee made of milk from a grey cow. Margayya goes through the puja with all rigour and at the end of it is full of a prosperous career.

Dr Pal, who sells him the manuscript of a book on Bed Life, for whatever ready cash Margayya's purse contains, assures him that the book named Domestic Harmony will sell in tens of thousands if only he can find a publisher. Madan Lal, “a man from the North”, reads the manuscript and agrees to publish it on a fifty-fifty partnership basis. The book is at once popular and sells like hotcakes and Margayya hits a fortune.

Margayya is again ruined through his son Balu. He had admitted him in school in great style, getting the blessing of his brother and sister-in-law next door. His wealth had made him become the Secretary of the School Managing Committee. This had armed him with enough power over the Headmaster and the School Staff. He had engaged a private tutor for his son and instructed him to thrash the boy whenever necessary. But Balu was not good at his studies. He could not clear his S.S.L.C. He tried to persuade him to take the examination for the second time. The result was that Balu seized the School Leaving Certificate Book, tore it into quarters and threw them into the gutter the same gutter which closed its dark waters over Margayya's red account book, carrying away the School Leaving Certificate Book. Then Balu ran away from home.

A few days later there was a letter from Madras telling Margayya that his son was dead. The brother's family immediately comes to his help, though Margayya felt that he could do without their help and wondered if that would change the existing relationship between them. He left for Madras, discovered through the good offices of a fellow traveller a police inspector in plain clothes that his son was not really dead, traced the boy and brought him home.

He wanted to marry him to a girl named Brinda, the daughter of the owner of a tea estate in Memphis Hills. When a pundit, after an honest study, declared that the horoscopes of Balu and Brinda did not match, he was curtly dismissed with a fee of one rupee. Another astrologer, whom Dr Pal found, gave it in writing that the two horoscopes matched perfectly and was paid Rs. 75 for his pains.

Balu and his wife were helped to set up an establishment of their own in Lawley Extension. Margayya, wishing to draw Dr Pal away from his son, sought his help in attracting deposits from Black Marketers on the promise of interest of 29%. If he got Rs. 20,000 deposit each day and paid Rs. 15,000 in interest, he had still Rs. 5,000 a day left in his hands as his own. Margayya became rich. It was now necessary for him to own a car. Every nook and corner of his house was stuffed with sacks full of currency notes. He was on the right side of the police, contributed to the War Fund when driven to do so, and worked day and night with his accounts and money bags, though his wife was unhappy at his straining himself so much.

One day Margayya visited his son in Lawley Extension. He found Brinda and her child. The girl could not hold back her tears while narrating Balu's nocturnal activities. When Margayya got out of the house, he found a car halting in front of it. Out of which emerged Balu. His companions were Dr Pal and a couple of women in the town.

The enraged Margayya pulled Dr Pal out of the car, beat him and dismissed the two women with contempt. The next day Dr Pal with a bandaged face whispered to all and sundry that things were not going well with Margayya's concerns. Hundreds of people swarmed Margayya and pressed him to return their deposits forthwith. All the accumulated wealth was disbursed. Still, hundreds of people could not be satisfied.

The run on the Bank led to Maragayya's filing an insolvency petition. And thus like a house of cards, the wealth that Margayya had accumulated was blown away. He advised his son to take his place under the Banyan tree with the old box. When Balu hesitated to do that for fear of what people would say about it, Margayya offered to do so himself.

== Film adaptation ==
The Financial Expert was adapted to a Kannada-language film, Banker Margayya, in 1983.
