= Indian Thought Publications =

Indian publishing company

- Industry: Publishing
- Founded: 1942
- Founder: R. K. Narayan
- Headquarters: Chennai, India
- Products: Books

Indian Thought Publications is a publisher founded in 1942, in Mysore by R. K. Narayan.

== History ==
Narayan founded the company as he was cut off from England owing to the war and needed an outlet for his works. The first book to be published by the company was Malgudi Days, in 1943. The publishing company followed a short-lived journal that he founded, of the same name. The company is currently managed from a tiny home-office in Chennai by Narayan's granddaughter Bhuvaneswari (Minnie).

Although the company was started as an effort in self-publishing, it is far from being a vanity press. The war and other factors meant that his British publishers did not stock their Indian warehouses and Indian readers had no access to his books resulting in Narayan starting the company. Most of the work was done by Narayan himself including distribution and collecting delinquent bills. During one such task, he met with the proprietor of India Book House who convinced him to hand over the distribution function to them. India Book House continues to be the company's sole distributor.

In 2006, on Narayan's birth centenary, Indian Thought Publications issued a commemorative coffee table edition of his 1974 autobiography, My Days, with an introduction by his long-time admirer Alexander McCall Smith.
