= Malgudi Days (short story collection) =

1943 collection of short stories by R. K. Narayan

- Author: R. K. Narayan
- Illustrator: R. K. Laxman
- Cover artist: Sahil Sahu
- Language: English
- Genre: Short story collections
- Publisher: Indian Thought Publications
- Publication date: 1943
- Publication place: India
- Media type: Print
- Pages: 150
- ISBN: 81-85986-17-7
- OCLC: 7813056
- Preceded by: The Dark Room
- Followed by: The English Teacher

Malgudi Days is a collection of short stories by R. K. Narayan published in 1943 by Indian Thought Publications.

The book was republished outside India in 1982 by Penguin Classics. The book includes 32 stories, all set in the fictional town of Malgudi, located in South India. Each of the stories portrays a facet of life in Malgudi. The New York Times described the virtue of the book as "everyone in the book seems to have a capacity for responding to the quality of his particular hour. It's an art we need to study and revive."

In 1986, a few of the stories in the book were included in the Malgudi Days television series and directed by actor and director, Shankar Nag.

In 2004, the project was revived with film-maker Kavitha Lankesh replacing the late Shankar Nag as director. The new series was telecast from April 26, 2006, on Doordarshan.

In 2014, Google commemorated Narayan's 108th birthday by featuring a Google Doodle showing him behind a copy of Malgudi Days.

== Chapters ==
- "An Astrologer's Day":

A short story about an astrologer who knows nothing about stars or astrology. He applied for the job after going on the run, though we are not told why he ran away. The townspeople believe his predictions because of his study, practice and shrewd guesswork. One day, a customer bets a large amount of money the astrologer cannot reveal anything of substance. The astrologer resists the bet until he recognizes the man (who is called Guru Nayak). After some haggling, the astrologer tells the man he had been stabbed and left for dead in a well. The impressed customer pays up (although not the promised sum) and the astrologer warns him not to travel to this part of the country again. That night, the astrologer's wife asks where he had been so late, and he confesses he had tried to kill the man years ago.

- "The Missing Mail":

A story about Thanappa, a postman who always talks to the people on his route. He delivered to a man named Ramanujam from before his daughter was born to the time she is of marrying age. After the last marriage prospect falls through, Thanappa recommends a suitor in a faraway town. The meeting goes well and everyone is rushing to get the wedding done May 20. If it is delayed even one day, the groom's "training" will delay it three years. After the wedding, Thanappa reveals a postcard to Ramanujam about the death of a relative, which should have been delivered May 20. Thanappa did not want to disrupt the wedding, even though hiding the letter should cost him his job. Ramanujam says he will not issue a complaint.

- "The Doctor's Word":

A story about Dr Raman, who by time and tradition is only called for life-and-death situations. As such, he believes pleasant lies can't save lives. He is very staunch about that. Suddenly his best friend, Gopal, falls terribly ill. After treating him, the doctor privately thinks he has 1:1000 odds of surviving, but his chances are worse the more he exerts himself. Gopal begs the doctor to tell him if he will make it; if not, he needs to sign his will then and there. Raman can't bear to tell Gopal the truth, but can't let him keep straining himself. He tells Gopal he will be fine. The next morning, Gopal's health is splendid, and the doctor says his survival will puzzle him the rest of his life.

- "Gateman's Gift":

A story about Govind Singh who served as a gatekeeper and security guard. He only spoke to the General Manager twice in his 25 years of service, and came to perceive the GM as a god. After retiring, he took up the hobby of making miniatures and dioramas using clay, sawdust, and paints. Each time his pension comes, he delivers his clay work to his old company, always asking what the GM thought of his last one. The accountant always says he liked it. One day, a registered letter from the GM comes, and Singh is too afraid to open it, thinking it is something horrible. He goes to an X-ray technician to see what's inside without opening it, but they tell him he is unwell. Singh concludes he is mad because he plays with clay, not because of his response to the letter. He goes through town acting like a complete madman until the accountant sees him and opens the letter. The GM had thanked him, sent a large check, and hoped to see more of his work in the future. Singh gives up his clay hobby, saying it is no work for a sane man.

- "The Blind Dog":

A story about a stray dog who befriends a blind beggar. When the old woman who cares for the blind man dies, he leashes the dog and begs while walking the streets. The blind man finds he has greatly increased his income this way becomes greedy. He constantly kicks the dog and beats him to keep working. When the market sellers learn he is so rich he's lending money, they cut the leash with scissors and the dog runs away. After a few weeks of not seeing the blind man or the dog, they see them again and the dog's leash is a metal chain. The blind man says his dog came back to him one night. The sellers pity the dog.

- "Fellow Feeling":

A story about Rajam Iyer, a Tamil Brahmin who is travelling on an express train. Another passenger gets on and starts verbally abusing a third passenger. Rajam gets involved and the bully complains that Brahmins are secretly eating meat and driving prices up. The argument escalates until they stand to fight. Rajam stops short of the first blow and explains that he will rearrange the bully's face so his mouth is under his left ear, bluffing. As he is about to strike again, the bully sees they are at a stop and leaps out the window, saying this is his stop. Rajam lies and tells the other passengers the bully got back on into a different compartment, but they don't believe him.

- "The Tiger's Claw":

A story about The Talkative Man, a recurring character in several short stories. Some hunters bring a dead tiger into town, and The Talkative Man tells a story to some children. When he was a fertilizer salesman, he stayed in a tiny village overnight in their train station. He left the door cracked because it got too hot to sleep. A tiger barged in and woke him up in the middle of the night. He barricaded himself behind a lot of furniture, so the tiger could only reach in one paw. The man used his knife to cut off three toes before the tiger retreated. Back in the town, the children ask to see the tiger's paw; sure enough, three toes are missing. The hunters say some tribesmen like to take tiger cubs and cut off three toes as good luck charms.

- "Iswaran":

A story about a man named Iswaran who failed his intermediate college exams nine years in a row. After taking the exams a tenth time, the day scores are reported has arrived. Instead of viewing his scores, Iswaran goes to the cinema. When other boys come in to the theater celebrating their own success, Iswaran becomes self-loathing and is sure he failed again. He decides to drown himself in the river. He writes a suicide note and leaves it in his jacket on the shore. But wanting to know for sure, he checks his score. Not only did he pass, but with second-class honors. In his excitement, he leaps into the river. His body and suicide note are discovered the next day.

- "Such Perfection":

A story about a sculptor who finishes a statue after five years of labor. It is a statue of the god Nataraja, and everyone insists its form is perfect; so perfect that if the people saw it, the glory of the god would consume them. The priest asks the sculptor to break off its little toe so that it will be safe to view, but the sculptor won't do it. The priest thus refuses to consecrate it in the temple. The sculptor turns his house into a temple to have it consecrated there. The god then comes to life and rattles the region with every kind of natural disaster. The people beg the sculptor to mar the statue's perfection after so many people died, but he won't. He ran to the overflowed lake to drown himself as an offering to the god, but on the way, a tree falls on his house. He returns to see the statue was unharmed except for a severed little toe. The imperfect statue is consecrated at the temple, and the sculptor gives up his trade.

- "Father's Help":

A story about Swami, a character from his first novel Swami and Friends. Swami oversleeps on Monday and convinces his mother to let him stay home from school. His father insists he still go to school with a "headache," so Swami lies and says his teacher Samuel beats children severely for lateness or any small offense. His father writes a letter for Swami to deliver to the headmaster and sends him to school. The letter will surely get Samuel fired, maybe even imprisoned. At school, Swami provokes Samuel to do something deserving of getting fired. But Samuel only canes his hands a few times, which Swami doesn't even react to. When he tries to deliver the letter to the headmaster, he is on leave all week. The assistant headmaster could accept it, but it's Samuel. Swami runs home without delivering the letter. His father thinks he was lying about the headmaster being on leave and says he deserves Samuel.

- "The Snake-Song":

A story about the Talkative Man. A group of men leave a concert hall having enjoyed the performance, but the Talkative Man looked tortured. He says taste has sunk and tells his story. He studied the bamboo flute with a master musician (who is so obscure his name is unknown, of course). A beggar interrupts the Talkative Man's practice at night and asks him for food. He declines the beggar even the right to come in and listen to him practicing. The beggar curses him, saying this was his last day of music. Later that night, a massive cobra comes and listens to him play. It gets agitated when he stops or plays anything other than the snake-song. After playing the same song all night, he throws himself prostrate and begs the snake to spare him. When he looks up, it is gone. The Talkative Man says he gave up his flute, but if he could find the beggar and ask forgiveness, he would take up his flute again.

- "Engine Trouble":

Another story about the Talkative Man. A carnival comes to town, and he wins a road engine (steam-powered tractor). Not knowing even how to drive or power the road engine, he simply leaves it in the park. The city starts to fine him for the parking space at over double his home rent. He arranges to move it, but it crashes in a wall instead, leaving him to pay for the damages. A swami comes to town, eating glass, burying himself alive, etc. The swami asks for a road engine for his assistant to run over his chest, but the city magistrate refuses to allow it. After a massive earthquake, the road engine lodges in a well owned by the same man whose wall was destroyed. He thanks the Talkative Man, as the city was going to fine him for the dirty water if it wasn't sealed. Of course, you can't see the engine lodged in the well anymore, as it is now sealed with concrete.

- "Forty-Five A Month":

A story about a daughter, Shanta, and her father, Venkat Rao. Shanta is a primary school student who is eager to go home from school early, as her father has promised to take her to the cinema. At home, she gets dressed up and waits for her father. When he doesn't come home by the time he said he would, she tries to find his office, but gets lost. A servant leads her back home. We flash back to that morning and follow Venkat Rao's day. He feels guilty that he stays at work until after his daughter goes to bed, seven days a week. So when Shanta asks to be taken to the cinema, he promises to take her. That afternoon, he asks his boss for personal leave or else he resigns. His boss tells him nothing is more urgent than work, so he goes back to working. Fed up with being bought for forty rupees a month, he writes a letter of resignation. His boss tells him he got a raise to forty-five rupees a month, so he tears up his letter. Venkat Rao gets home after his daughter falls asleep and tells his wife he can't take Shanta out at all since he got a raise.

- "Out of Business"

A story about Rama Rao, a man who had just lost his gramophone business as the only factory in the region closed down. Rama Rao looks for a local job, to no success. The family lay off their servants and rent out the house they built to live in a smaller abode. With no more job prospects, Rama Rao enters a magazine crossword contest, where everyone who gets every answer right wins 4000 rupees. After seeing how badly he lost, he lays down on the train tracks to die. After waiting too long, he finds a crowd at the station and hears that a derailment has delayed all trains three more hours. Recognizing his good fortune, he goes home and his wife tells him the renters want to buy their house. He is excited to sell for 4500 rupees and will use some of the money to go to Madras and get a job there.

- "Attila":

A story about a friendly dog named Attila, after the "Scourge of Europe". After the neighborhood experienced a number of break-ins, a family buys a dog for security. He is friendly with everyone and does not stop thieves from taking their garden flowers, so the family keep him inside at night. One night, a thief named Ranga does break in to steal jewels. Attila is so excited to meet this new friend that he follows Ranga into the open street. The family assumes the dog was stolen too, but they see Attila run to catch him. Ranga gets scared and runs, but trips over the dog, spilling the jewels he stole. The police arrest Ranga, and Attila is praised for being a master detective.

- "The Axe"

A story about Velan, who an astrologer predicted would live in a three-story house. Velan came from the poorest family in his village. At age 18, his father slapped his face in public, and he left. After a few days of walking and begging, he got a job as a gardener for an old man. The plot of land was large and they built a three-story mansion on it, but Velan lived in his hut on the grounds. After being awed by the mansion's construction, he grips a margosa's stem in his fingers and tells it to grow up big and worthy of the house or he will pluck it out. It does grow, and his master's great-grandchildren play under it and hundreds of birds live in its branches. Velan's master dies and the house trades hands with family members for some years until wear and tear make the house look haunted and no one will live in it, except Velan when he is given the keys. Some years later, a man arrives to say the plot has been bought and will be cleared for small housing. One morning, Velan awakes to the sound of men chopping the margosa tree with axes. He begs them to stop until he has gathered his belongings and gone out of earshot.

- "Lawley Road"

Another story about the Talkative Man. Just after India's independence, there was a flurry of patriotism. The municipality renamed streets from English things to Indian names. There was a statue of a Sir Frederick Lawley in town, and when the street bearing his name was changed, the municipality voted to remove the statue. The people also researched Lawley and found he had been a British tyrant over the Indians. When the city failed to find anyone to remove it within budget, the Talkative Man is offered the chance to take it for himself. He does and lodges it halfway inside his house with great difficulty. When he writes in the news how he got the statue, historical societies across India are outraged, as there are two Sir Lawleys, and the statue celebrated a kind man who founded Malgudi and even died to save Indians. The public protests the removal of the statue, but now neither the city nor the Talkative Man have funds to move it again. An election is coming, and if the statue problem is not returned to the city, the whole council will be voted out. The Chairman of Malgudi buys the Talkative Man's house with his private fund.

- "Trail of the Green Blazer"

The story follows Ranga, a small-time pickpocket in Malgudi, who makes a living by blending into busy marketplaces and silently stealing from unsuspecting people. One day, while scanning a crowd, his eyes fall upon a well-dressed man wearing a green blazer. Ranga carefully shadows him, pretending to be an ordinary passerby. The man stops to buy something, giving Ranga the perfect chance to slip his hand into the pocket and grab a wallet. But as fate would have it, the man suddenly realizes what is happening and grabs Ranga’s wrist. In the ensuing chaos, the crowd gathers. Ranga tries desperately to wriggle free by pretending innocence, but guilt is written on his face. The irony of the tale is that his profession thrives on other people’s lack of attention, yet here, his own lapse exposes him. Narayan highlights greed, human weakness, and how a moment’s miscalculation can undo years of stealth.

- "The Martyr's Corner"

Ramu is a poor man in Malgudi who earns a livelihood by selling snacks in the busy market square. His tiny makeshift stall consists of only a few items, but it attracts steady customers every evening. For Ramu, this modest trade is his entire world, his only means of survival. However, one day, a political rally and protest break out near his corner. The situation turns violent, and the crowd clashes with the police. In the chaos, Ramu’s stall is overturned and destroyed. His livelihood is wiped out in a single moment of unrest. Later, the very spot where he once worked becomes known as “Martyr’s Corner,” a symbolic site for political memory. Ironically, while the world sees it as a place of patriotic sacrifice, for Ramu it is the painful reminder of his personal tragedy and ruined life. Narayan poignantly shows how the poor often pay the heaviest price for events beyond their control.

- "Wife's Holiday"

This humorous tale revolves around a man who feels restless after his wife goes to her parents’ house for a short visit. At first, he looks forward to his freedom, believing he can now relax without her watchful eye. He spends his time enjoying food outside, meeting friends, and indulging in little pleasures. However, he soon realizes that her absence creates a deep void in his life. The house feels empty and joyless, and he begins to miss her constant care and companionship. His routine becomes chaotic, with no one to cook, manage the household, or share conversations. What started as excitement for a “holiday” quickly turns into loneliness and regret. The story humorously yet tenderly captures the emotional bond in marriage, where partners often fail to appreciate each other until they are apart. Narayan conveys the irony of relationships—the very things we take for granted are what we miss most when gone.

- "A Shadow"

The story A Shadow from Malgudi Days revolves around Sambu, a young boy who longs to see his deceased father on the cinema screen. His father had acted in a film before his death, and now it was being shown in town. While Sambu is excited, his mother is horrified and reluctant, as watching the film would reopen her grief. Despite her resistance, Sambu eagerly attends the show and is deeply moved to see his father alive again—singing, walking, and talking. For him, the film brings back cherished memories, and he feels as if his father has returned. However, the mother finds the experience unbearable, breaking down when a scene reminds her of their personal life. For her, the film is a painful shadow of loss. The contrast highlights Sambu’s innocence and longing versus his mother’s sorrow. Ultimately, the story poignantly portrays how memories of the dead affect people differently, blending love, grief, and the struggle to move on.

- "A Willing Slave"

Ayah, a devoted servant, works tirelessly in a household, giving her complete loyalty and affection to her employers and their children. She treats the children as if they were her own, serving them with love, care, and patience. Over time, her identity becomes tied entirely to her role in the family, leaving her with no life of her own. However, when the children grow up, she becomes unnecessary. The family that once relied on her so much slowly detaches, leaving her with nothing to cling to. Even when she realizes she is no longer wanted, Ayah still remains loyal, unable to separate her existence from the family’s needs. Narayan highlights the thankless sacrifices of domestic workers who dedicate their lives selflessly yet are left without recognition or security in old age. Through Ayah’s story, he reflects on love, loyalty, and the cruel irony of devotion that binds someone to servitude until they lose themselves completely.

- "Leela's Friend"

Sidda, a poor man, finds work as a servant in the household of a wealthy family. He quickly forms a deep bond with their young daughter, Leela, who adores him. Sidda spends hours playing with her, telling imaginative stories, and caring for her with patience and kindness. To Leela, Sidda is not just a servant but a trusted friend and companion. However, when a gold chain goes missing, suspicion falls on Sidda simply because of his lower status. The police arrest him, and the family, without proof, assumes his guilt. Later, the chain is found elsewhere, proving Sidda’s innocence. Yet by then, his reputation and dignity are destroyed. Leela, too young to understand the injustice, simply longs for her friend’s return. The story exposes the harsh realities of class discrimination and the blind prejudices faced by the poor, even when they show love and loyalty. Narayan blends innocence with tragedy in this moving tale.

"Mother and Son"

This story explores the relationship between an overprotective mother and her grown-up son, who is caught between his own desires and his mother’s controlling nature. The mother, widowed and insecure, constantly interferes in her son’s decisions, believing she knows what is best for him. She dictates everything from his marriage choices to his career. The son, though dutiful, feels suffocated by her dominance and longs for independence. At the same time, he is bound by guilt and responsibility, unable to rebel against her openly. This constant struggle creates tension in the household, with both mother and son locked in emotional dependence. Narayan presents the irony of parental love that transforms into possessiveness, depriving children of freedom while keeping parents anxious and unfulfilled. Through this domestic conflict, the story highlights the universal theme of individuality versus duty within families, showing how excessive control can erode both affection and peace at home.

- "Naga"

This story revolves around a snake charmer and his beloved pet cobra, Naga, who is not just an animal but also his livelihood. The man earns a living by showing tricks with Naga, moving from place to place and performing in front of crowds. He treats the snake with affection, feeding and caring for it like a family member. However, times change, and fewer people are interested in watching such shows. The man’s earnings decline sharply, leaving him struggling to survive. Despite his hardships, he refuses to part with Naga, as their bond is deeper than money. Finally, faced with starvation, he reluctantly considers letting the snake go, but his heart cannot bear the separation. The story reflects the themes of poverty, love for animals, and the struggle of traditional professions against modernization. Narayan shows how survival can clash with sentiment, leaving the poor torn between livelihood and emotional attachment.

- "Selvi"

Selvi is a talented young woman with a mesmerizing voice who rises to fame as a singer. She comes from a humble background but is discovered by Mohan, a theater owner, who quickly becomes both her manager and husband. Under his strict control, Selvi’s life changes drastically. Mohan exploits her talent, using her for wealth and status, while Selvi remains obedient, living entirely under his shadow. Despite her fame and success, she is unhappy, as she has no freedom over her own choices or career. Her art becomes more of a business than an expression of passion. As time passes, Selvi begins to realize that she is trapped in an unequal marriage where love has been replaced by control and manipulation. Through her story, Narayan highlights the exploitation of women and artists, showing how talent can be commodified when power and authority overshadow personal happiness and dignity.

- "Second Opinion"

Kannan, a man suffering from health issues, is caught between two contrasting medical advices. His trusted family doctor gives him one set of instructions, but another doctor offers a completely different opinion. Confused and anxious, Kannan finds himself torn between the two diagnoses. His wife, deeply worried, insists on seeking the “better” opinion, hoping for certainty. However, instead of clarity, the conflicting advice only increases the family’s tension. The story portrays how ordinary people often struggle when faced with contradictory authority figures, especially in matters of health. Narayan subtly depicts the anxiety, helplessness, and blind reliance on doctors that patients feel. Ultimately, the tale emphasizes how human beings seek assurance in uncertain times but often end up more bewildered by too many voices. It reflects both the fragility of life and the limitations of human knowledge, making health a matter of faith as much as science.

- "Cat Within"

This humorous yet symbolic story is about a mischievous cat that sneaks into a house and hides within, creating chaos. The residents, unable to locate it, are disturbed by its movements and sounds. They try several ways to chase it out, but the cat remains elusive, causing fear and superstition among them. Some believe it brings bad luck, while others see it as a harmless creature. The house becomes divided between those who exaggerate the cat’s presence and those who dismiss it. Eventually, the cat quietly slips away, leaving behind confusion and relief. Narayan uses the situation to illustrate how human imagination and superstition often magnify small issues into larger troubles. The story humorously reflects on fear, human behavior, and the tendency to give ordinary events exaggerated meanings. Beneath its simplicity lies a commentary on how people let trivial disturbances disrupt their peace.

- "The Edge"

Ranga, a knife-grinder, lives a simple life sharpening knives and scissors in Malgudi. Though his profession is humble and outdated, he takes pride in his work. However, times are changing, and fewer people require his services, leaving him struggling for survival. Ranga’s dreams for his daughter—to study and have a better life—clash with his wife’s traditional desire for her to marry early. Desperate for money, Ranga becomes involved in a risky scheme, hoping to secure his family’s future. But fate does not favor him, and he finds himself trapped by misfortune. Despite his failures, he continues to work hard, carrying on with “desperate energy.” The story highlights dignity in labor, the struggles of the working class, and the clash between hope and harsh reality. Narayan portrays Ranga as a rare resilient figure, showing that even when life doesn’t improve, perseverance keeps the human spirit alive.

- "God and the Cobbler"

This story narrates the encounter between a foreign hippie and an Indian cobbler in Malgudi. The hippie, having renounced wealth and modern life, wanders freely, while the cobbler toils daily in poverty. Each man idealizes the other—the hippie admires the cobbler’s simplicity, mistaking it for spiritual bliss, while the cobbler sees the foreigner as almost divine, given his strange lifestyle. Their conversation reveals mutual misunderstandings about life, religion, and happiness. At one point, the hippie suggests that the flowers falling on the cobbler all day are divine blessings, but the cobbler bluntly asks, “Can I eat this flower?”—showing the stark difference between romanticized poverty and real suffering. Narayan uses irony to contrast perspectives: the hippie escapes life’s burdens by choice, while the cobbler is trapped by circumstances. The story reveals illusions, cultural gaps, and the human tendency to glorify what one does not experience.

- "Hungry Child"

This moving story is about a destitute child in Malgudi who roams the streets searching for food. Starving and helpless, the boy becomes a silent witness to the indifference of society. He sees abundance everywhere—shops full of sweets, people eating in restaurants—but no one offers him even a morsel. His hunger grows unbearable, and he becomes weak, almost invisible to the bustling crowd around him. Narayan captures the child’s suffering in sharp contrast to the careless indulgence of others, exposing the cruelty of social inequality. The boy represents countless nameless, faceless children trapped in the cycle of poverty. The story does not provide a happy resolution, emphasizing instead the harsh reality of neglect faced by the poor. With poignant simplicity, Narayan awakens compassion in readers, showing how hunger is not just physical pain but also a reminder of society’s failure to care for its most vulnerable.

- "Emden"

This story reflects the wartime atmosphere during World War II when fear of air raids spread across Indian towns. The people of Malgudi live in constant anxiety, imagining dangers that may never arrive. They recall the name “Emden,” the notorious German warship known for bombarding cities, using it as a symbol of terror. The very mention of “Emden” creates panic, leading people to exaggerate threats and spread rumors. Families take precautions, hide valuables, and live in restless fear of being attacked. Narayan portrays how ordinary citizens, far removed from the actual war front, become victims of rumor, fear, and imagination. The story is not about war itself but about the psychology of fear and how communities react to unseen threats. It humorously yet seriously reflects how human minds can magnify dangers, letting rumors dictate life more than reality itself.
