= A Horse and Two Goats and Other Stories =

Short story collection by R.K. Narayan

A Horse and Two Goats
- First edition
- Author: Rasipuram Krishnaswamy Iyer Narayanaswami [alias R K Narayan]
- Illustrator: Rasipuram Krishnaswamy Laxman [alias R K Laxman]
- Genre: Collection of short stories
- Publisher: The Bodley Head
- Publication date: 1970
- Publication place: India
- Media type: Print
- Pages: 160
- ISBN: 978-0-370-01438-8
- OCLC: 152850
- Dewey Decimal: 823
- LC Class: PZ3.N166 Ho3 PR9499.3.N3

A Horse and Two Goats and Other Stories (also published as A Horse and Two Goats) is a collection of short stories by R. K. Narayan, published in 1970 by The Bodley Head. The book is illustrated by R. K. Laxman, Narayan's brother, and includes five stories. The title story presents a subtle narrative centered on a business transaction between an American tourist and an Indian goat herder, Muni, arising from their mutual inability to communicate.
