= The Man-Eater of Malgudi =

1961 novel by R.K. Narayan

- First US edition
- Author: R.K. Narayan
- Language: English
- Publisher: Viking Press (US)
- Publication date: 1961
- Publication place: India
- Media type: Print (Hardback & Paperback)
- Pages: 250

The Man-Eater of Malgudi is a 1961 Indian novel, written by R. K. Narayan. In this novel R.K. Narayan uses the historical reference of Bhasmasura.

== Plot ==
The plot revolves around the life of an Indian printer named Nataraj, who lives in a huge ancestral house in Malgudi, a fictional town in South India. He leads a contented lifestyle, with a circle of friends, including a poet, a journalist named Sen, and his sole employee, Sastri. One day, Vasu, a taxidermist, arrives in Malgudi in search of the wildlife in the nearby Mempi hills. Arriving at Nataraj's printing press, the first encounter between the two, he demands the printing of 500 visiting cards. Although Nataraj is unsure whether Vasu is a friend or an enemy, he dislikes his company due to his brazen behaviour.

Vasu is a bully, compared to a Rakshasa (a demon) by Nataraj and Sastri. Vasu takes up residence in the attic of Nataraj's press, convincing Nataraj that he will stay there as a self-invited guest for only a few days until he finds somewhere else to stay. Unknown to Nataraj, Vasu sees the place as very suitable for his activities as a taxidermist, and plans otherwise. As the story continues, Vasu encroaches on Nataraj's life, bullies away his friends and customers, shoots someone's pet dog and many other animals and birds near the residence, poaches wildlife from the Mempi hills, and creates a stench in the neighborhood through his taxidermy. When Nataraj questions him, Vasu files a complaint against Nataraj with the Rent Control authority as a self declared tenant, as well as entertaining women in the attic and disturbing the peace of Malgudi.

Nataraj's poet friend holds a commemorative function for the release of a book of poetry on Krishna. Rangi informs Nataraj that Vasu wants to kill Kumar, the elephant which Nataraj brought from Mempi Hills to treat an ailment as a favour to one of his friends. Nataraj meets Muthu, the tea shop owner, under unexpected circumstances, and Muthu agrees to help him with Vasu. Nataraj learns that Vasu plans to shoot Kumar for his collection and business. Nataraj tries desperately to stop him, but fails. Nataraj decides to confront Vasu once and for all, but finds him sleeping. The next morning, however, he discovers that Vasu is dead.

The autopsy rules that Vasu was attacked on the head by a blunt weapon. The case is closed, but the reputation of Nataraj's press is ruined, and his friends and others start avoiding him. Nataraj later learns through his friend Sastri (who heard from Rangi) that Vasu was not murdered, but died in an attempt to smash a mosquito sitting on his head, damaging one of his nerves with his powerful hand and dying instantly.

The story ends with the message that all demons, devils and monsters bring downfall on themselves.

== Characters ==
- Nataraj - a printing press owner.
- Poet - friend of Nataraj
- Sen - A journalist, friend of Nataraj.
- Sastri - employee and friend of Nataraj.
- Vasu - a taxidermist, the antagonist of the novel.
- Muthu - a tea shop owner.
- Kumar - an elephant which was brought from Mempi Hills by Nataraj, for medical treatment.
- Rangi - a temple dancer and a prostitute.
- Joshi - doctor who treats Kumar (the elephant).
