= Mr. Sampath – The Printer of Malgudi =

Novel by R. K. Narayan

Mr. Sampath - The Printer of Malgudi
- First edition
- Author: R.K. Narayan
- Language: English language
- Genre: Novel
- Publisher: Eyre and Spottiswoode
- Publication date: 1949
- Publication place: India
- Media type: Print
- ISBN: 978-1-4000-4477-1
- OCLC: 64574159
- Dewey Decimal: 823/.914 22
- LC Class: PR9499.3.N3 A6 2006b
- Preceded by: The English Teacher
- Followed by: The Financial Expert

Mr. Sampath – The Printer of Malgudi is a 1949 novel by R. K. Narayan. It was adapted into the films Mr. Sampat (Hindi, 1952) and a Tamil film sharing the same title (1972).

A comic realist novel of manners, Mr. Sampath marks the first of three Narayan novels that take an external approach, focusing on events outside the protagonist, in contrast to Narayan's more internally-focused earlier novels. The novel is set in 1938 under the British Raj, in the fictional town of Malgudi.

== Plot ==
The novel is made up of two parts: a first part dealing with the publication of a newspaper and centered on Mr. Sampath, and a second part focus on movie production and centered on Mr. Srinivas.

In the first part, to bring out the journal The Banner, Mr. Srinivas, the editor, and Mr. Sampath, the printer, have to work together. The two entirely contrasting good-hearted characters forge a great partnership that makes The Banner the center of attention in Malgudi. However, a situation arises and they have to temporarily discontinue the journal.

In the second part, Srinivas and Sampath join hands with a film-making company where they have to trace varying paths, with their special bond still very deep. A love affair with the actress of the movie makes life difficult for the daring and over-ambitious Sampath, while the ethical Srinivas has his problems of over-responsibility. Some sour incidents in the studio force Srinivas to quit and revive his Banner with another printer, a thing that doesn't seem to bother Sampath caught entirely in the charm of the heroine. But Sampath comes back after the loss of the lady, his wealth, fame, and peace.
