= Malgudi Days (TV series) =

Indian television series started in 1980s

- Based on: Malgudi Days by R. K. Narayan
- Directed by: Shankar Nag (seasons 1–3); Kavitha Lankesh (season 4)
- Theme music composer: L. Vaidyanathan
- Composer: L. Vaidyanathan
- Country of origin: India
- Original languages: Hindi; English
- No. of seasons: 4
- No. of episodes: 54

Production
- Producer: T. S. Narasimhan
- Cinematography: S. Ramachandra
- Editor: Suresh Urs

Original release
- Network: Doordarshan
- Release: 24 September 1986 – 2006

Mālgudi Days is an Indian television series that premiered in 1986. Initially produced in both English (13 episodes) and Hindi (54 episodes), the show is based on R. K. Narayan’s 1943 short story collection of the same name. Directed by Kannada actor and director Shankar Nag, the series was produced by T.S. Narasimhan, with music composed by L. Vaidyanathan. Renowned cartoonist R. K. Laxman, Narayan's younger brother, contributed as the sketch artist. The series was revived in 2006 with 15 new episodes directed by Kavitha Lankesh.

== Plot ==
The series is an adaptation of several collections of short stories and novels by R. K. Narayan, depicting life in the fictional South Indian town of Malgudi. It draws from works such as Malgudi Days, A Horse and Two Goats and Other Stories, An Astrologer's Day and Other Short Stories, Swami and Friends, and The Vendor of Sweets, offering a portrayal of rural and small-town India through its everyday characters and scenarios.

Each episode introduces different characters and events, capturing recurring themes of innocence, irony, and social observation. In Swami and Friends, for example, the series explores the childhood experiences of Swami and his friends, highlighting post-colonial societal shifts. The Vendor of Sweets addresses generational conflicts through the relationship between Jagan, an elderly sweet vendor, and his modern-thinking son.

The series covers a spectrum of narratives, from interactions with eccentric astrologers to villagers grappling with moral quandaries, humorous misunderstandings, and personal challenges. Narayan’s portrayal of Malgudi offers both humorous and critical reflections on prevalent social dynamics and presenting a timeless view of community life.

== Episodes ==
=== Season 1 (1986 - 13 Episodes) ===
| Episode | Hindi Title |
|---|---|
| A Hero | Hero |
| A Horse and Two Goats | Muni |
| The Missing Mail | Dhakia |
| The Hoard | Maha Kanjus |
| Cat Within | Paap ka Gada |
| Leela’s Friend | Sidda |
| Old Man of the Temple | Mandir ka Budda |
| The Watchman | Chowkidar |
| A Willing Slave | Aaya |
| Roman Image | Rome ka Murthi |
| Sweets for Angels | Kaali |
| The Seventh House | Saathvan Ghar |
| Nitya | Nitya |

=== Season 2 (1987 - 13 Episodes) ===
| Episode | Hindi Title |
|---|---|
| Engine Trouble | Engine ki Kahani |
| Iswaran | |
| The Gateman’s Gift | Govind Singh ki Bhent |
| The Edge | Dhara |
| Forty-Five a Month | 45 Rupiya |
| Swamy and Friends – Part 1 | Swami – 1 |
| Swamy and Friends – Part 2 | Swami – 2 |
| Swamy and Friends – Part 3 | Swami – 3 |
| Swamy and Friends – Part 4 | Swami – 4 |
| Swamy and Friends – Part 5 | Swami – 5 |
| Swamy and Friends – Part 6 | Swami – 6 |
| Swamy and Friends – Part 7 | Swami – 7 |
| Swamy and Friends – Part 8 | Swami – 8 |

=== Season 3 (1988 - 13 Episodes) ===
| Episode | Hindi Title |
|---|---|
| Performing Child | Abhinetri |
| The Career | Ramji ki Leela |
| Trail of the Green Blazer | Pocket Maar |
| Naga – Part 1 | |
| Naga – Part 2 | |
| Vendor of Sweets – Part 1 | Mithaiwala – 1 |
| Vendor of Sweets – Part 2 | Mithaiwala – 2 |
| Vendor of Sweets – Part 3 | Mithaiwala – 3 |
| Vendor of Sweets – Part 4 | Mithaiwala – 4 |
| Vendor of Sweets – Part 5 | Mithaiwala – 5 |
| Vendor of Sweets – Part 6 | Mithaiwala – 6 |
| Vendor of Sweets – Part 7 | Mithaiwala – 7 |
| Vendor of Sweets – Part 8 | Mithaiwala – 8 |

=== Season 4 (2006 - 15 Episodes) ===
| Episode | Hindi Title |
|---|---|
| Annamalai – Part 1 | |
| Annamalai – Part 2 | |
| The Gold Belt | Sone ka Kamarband |
| Dodu | |
| Doctor's Word | |
| Four Rupees | |
| Neighbour's Help | |
| Minister Without Portfolio & Korean Grass | |
| Salt & Saw Dust – Part 1 | |
| Salt & Saw Dust – Part 2 | |
| Lawley Road – Part 1 | |
| Lawley Road – Part 2 | |
| The Antidote | |
| The Snake Song | |
| An Astrologer's Day | |

== Cast ==
- Master Manjunath as W. S. Swaminathan "Swami"
- Girish Karnad as W. T. Srinivasan
- Vaishali Kasaravalli as Swami's mother
- Suhasini Adarkar as Swami's grandmother
- Kanti Madiya as Muniya "Muni"
- B. Jayashree as Muniya's wife
- Somu as Shopkeeper
- Teddy White as Frank
- Deven Bhojani as Nitya
- Harish Patel as Various characters
- Anant Nag as Various characters
- Vishnuvardhan as Venkat Rao
- Shankar Nag as Venkatesh
- Ramesh Bhat as various characters
- Rohit Srinath as Rajam
- Raghuram Sitaram as Mani
- Chetan as S. Somashekar "Somu"
- Arundathi Nag as Kamala
- Sunil Sadanand as Mali, Jagan's son
- Mandeep Rai as Narsimha, Jagan's cousin
- Ashok Mandanna as Thanappa
- Vasanth Josalkar as Govind Singh
- Kalpana Naganath as various characters
- Dina Pathak as Ayah
- Jagadish Malnad as Sidda
- Mico Chandru as Swamy's father
- Sampath Raj as Ekambaram
- S. K. Padmadevi as Elderly villager
- Siddaraj Kalyankar (The Gold Belt) Main cast
- G. K. Govinda Rao as Swamy's headmaster (Albert Mission School)
- Lohitashwa as Nitya's Father

== Production ==
The series Malgudi Days, comprising thirty nine episodes, was first telecast on Doordarshan in 1986. Most of the series was shot in Agumbe village in Shimoga district, Karnataka. The home was Kalkodu near Agumbe. Art director John Devaraj transformed Agumbe into Malgudi by creating "carts, statues, avenues, shops, bus stand, schools, shops". Donkeys were transported from Shimoga to Agumbe and elephants from Bangalore, Austin and Hindustan cars were borrowed from friends while a road-roller had to be transported from Bangalore. Shankar Nag erected a land "replete with dancers, wrestlers, fire eaters, bangle sellers" for the episode "Talkative Man". Shankar Nag and Narasimhan initially considered Mysore but since the town has become urbanized, they considered Nanjangud however they rejected it "because of its proximity to Mysore" then they finally zeroed in on Agumbe. Some episodes were filmed in Bengaluru and some others in Devarayanadurga located in Tumakuru district in Karnataka. One episode, "Nitya", was shot entirely in Devarayanadurga. Railway station scenes were shot at Arasalu village railway station. Shankar preferred to shoot the series in "celluloid film rather than shoot digitally".

== Revival ==
In 2004, the project was revived with filmmaker Kavitha Lankesh replacing Shankar Nag, as director. The new series was telecasted from 26 April 2006 on Doordarshan. Most of the stories in the series are one episode long and were derived from the books A Horse and Two Goats, Malgudi Days, Swami and Friends and The Vendor of Sweets.

== Legacy ==
Indian Railways decided to rename Arasalu Railway station of Shivamogga District, Karnataka, India to Malgudi Railway station as homage to the location of Malgudi Days serial.
