= The Guide =

1958 novel by R. K. Narayan

- First US edition
- Author: R. K. Narayan
- Language: English
- Genre: Philosophical novel
- Publisher: Viking Press (US); Methuen (UK)
- Publication date: 1958
- Publication place: India
- Media type: Print (hardcover & paperback)
- Pages: 220 pp
- ISBN: 0-670-35668-9 (first American edition)
- OCLC: 65644730

The Guide is a 1958 novel written in English by the Indian author R. K. Narayan. Like most of his works, the events of this novel take place in Malgudi, a fictional town in South India. The novel describes the transformation of the protagonist, Raju, from a tour guide to a spiritual guide and then one of the greatest holy men of India.

This novel earned Narayan the first Sahitya Akademi Award for English in 1960, awarded by the Sahitya Akademi, India’s National Academy of Letters. In 2022, it was included on the "Big Jubilee Read" list of 70 books by Commonwealth authors selected to celebrate the Platinum Jubilee of Elizabeth II.

== Plot summary ==
The protagonist, Raju, who is nicknamed "Railway Raju", is characterized as being a corrupt and popular tour guide. In the story, he falls in love with a beautiful woman named Rosie, who is married to an archaeologist named Marco, while the couple is visiting Malgudi as tourists. Marco disapproves of Rosie's passion for dancing but Raju encourages Rosie to pursue her dreams and become a dancer. With this interaction, they begin to spend time with each other and become very close.

Upon learning about their relationship, Marco leaves Rosie in Malgudi and returns to Madras alone. Rosie seeks refuge at Raju's home, and they start living together. However, Raju's mother does not approve of their relationship and leaves them.

Raju becomes Rosie's stage manager, and with his marketing tactics, Rosie gains recognition as a dancer. With his success, Raju becomes overly confident and begins to assert more control over Rosie's life for financial gain. He becomes involved in a forgery case related to Rosie's signature. Raju is sentenced to two years in prison, despite Rosie's defence.

After completing his sentence, Raju passes through a village called Mangal, where he is mistaken for a sadhu (a spiritual guide). To avoid returning to Malgudi in disgrace, he decides to stay in an abandoned temple near Mangal. There, he takes on the role of a sadhu, delivering sermons and solving the villagers' daily problems and disputes.

During a famine in the village, some of the villagers request help from Raju, believing that rain will come and end the famine if he fasts. Raju decides to confess his entire past to Velan, who had initially discovered him in the temple and had unwavering faith in him like the rest of the villagers. However, Velan remains unchanged by the confession, and Raju resolves to continue with the fast.

As news of Raju's fast spreads through the media, a large crowd gathers to witness the spectacle, much to Raju's annoyance. On the morning of the eleventh day of his fast, he goes to the riverside as part of his daily ritual. He senses rain falling in the distant hills and collapses into the water. Whether it actually rained or if Raju died remains unknown and open to the reader's interpretation.

== Adaptations ==
The film Guide was released in 1965, based on the novel. It was directed by Vijay Anand. It starred Dev Anand as Raju, Waheeda Rehman as Rosie, and Leela Chitnis in the lead roles. The film's score was composed by S. D. Burman. The movie's ending differs from that of the novel, in which the fate of some characters remain unanswered.

A 120-minute U.S. version was written by Pearl S. Buck, and directed and produced by Tad Danielewski. The film was screened at the 2007 Cannes Film Festival, 42 years after its release.

The novel was also adapted into a play in 1968. The play was profiled in the William Goldman book The Season: A Candid Look at Broadway.
