= The Painter of Signs =

1976 novel by R. K. Narayan

- First edition (US)
- Author: R. K. Narayan
- Cover artist: Abner Graboff
- Publisher: Viking Press (US); Heinemann (UK)
- Publication date: 1976
- ISBN: 0-670-53567-2
- Preceded by: My Days
- Followed by: A Tiger for Malgudi

The Painter of Signs is a 1976 novel by R. K. Narayan.

== Plot ==
Raman is a sign-painter who takes the art of calligraphy very seriously. He devotedly creates the perfect signboard for all his customers, taking great care in the styling of words on the board. Made using the "best rosewood" from the Mempi mountains, Raman believes that his signboards are a notch above his rival Jayaraj's. Living with his aunt, a conservative old woman who likes to ramble about mythological stories and old family gossip, on Ellaman Street, Raman goes through periods of frustration at his aunt's interest in his going abouts and feelings of guilt for ignoring her affection and presence. Not orthodox himself, Raman neither sports a tuft like others from his caste nor has inhibitions in eating meat if necessary. He looks down on superstitions and old-fashioned notions of religion and caste and spends his time reading ancient copies of books on science and history. He does have a tendency to quote from the scriptures and make associations with events in the scriptures and those in his life.

Daisy, an intense young woman involved in family planning campaigns, hires Raman to make a signboard for her office. For no reason whatsoever, Raman finds himself bewitched by her beauty, and more so by her precision, authority and her devotion to her career. It so happens that he has to accompany Daisy on a three-week campaign in the villages around Malgudi to identify potential sites where he can paint signs and messages on population control and finds himself further attracted to her firmness, simplicity, and her tendency to shun luxuries and comforts of all sorts. He finds that his resolve to remain unmarried, seeing marriage as commonplace and unnecessary, is weakening.

The story goes on to outline Daisy's complicated past and her eventual admission of a mutual attraction for Raman. The two start spending the nights together, and decide to get a Gandharva marriage, the simplest form of marital union. Daisy seems to be unaffected by the relationship though, and tells Raman that she will not change her last name, or house-keep for him. Raman mulls over the eventualities of such a wedlock, but is steadfast in his affection and love for Daisy and constantly tells himself that her needs and wishes will always be more important than his. His aunt, upset over her nephew's unorthodox afflictions - especially at his decision to marry out of caste - asks him to arrange a one way trip to Benaras for her. His repeated beseechings to her to stay and bless him and Daisy have no effect. On the morning that Daisy is to move into Raman's house on Ellaman Street, she changes her mind about Raman, feeling that her sense of purpose and her independent existence may be affected by married life. She decides to leave Malgudi for a three-year family planning initiative in villages all over India. Confused and befuddled, Raman tries his best to convince her, telling her that his house on Ellaman street will be open for her whenever she decides to return.
