= R. K. Narayan =

Indian writer (1906–2001)

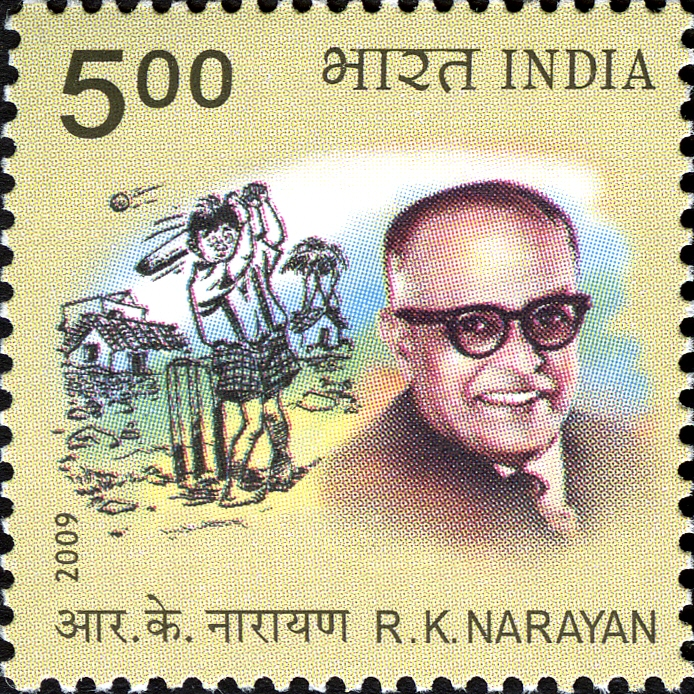
- Narayan on a 2009 stamp of India
- Born: 10 October 1906; Madras, Madras Presidency, British Raj
- Died: 13 May 2001 (aged 94); Chennai, Tamil Nadu, India
- Education: Maharaja's College, Mysore
- Occupation: Writer
- Spouse: Rajam (m. 1934; died 1939)
- Children: Hema Narayan
- Relatives: R. K. Laxman (brother)
- Writing career
- Genres: Fiction, mythology and non-fiction
- Notable awards: Padma Vibhushan; Sahitya Akademi Fellowship; Benson Medal

Member of Parliament, Rajya Sabha
- In office 12 May 1986 – 31 May 1992

Signature
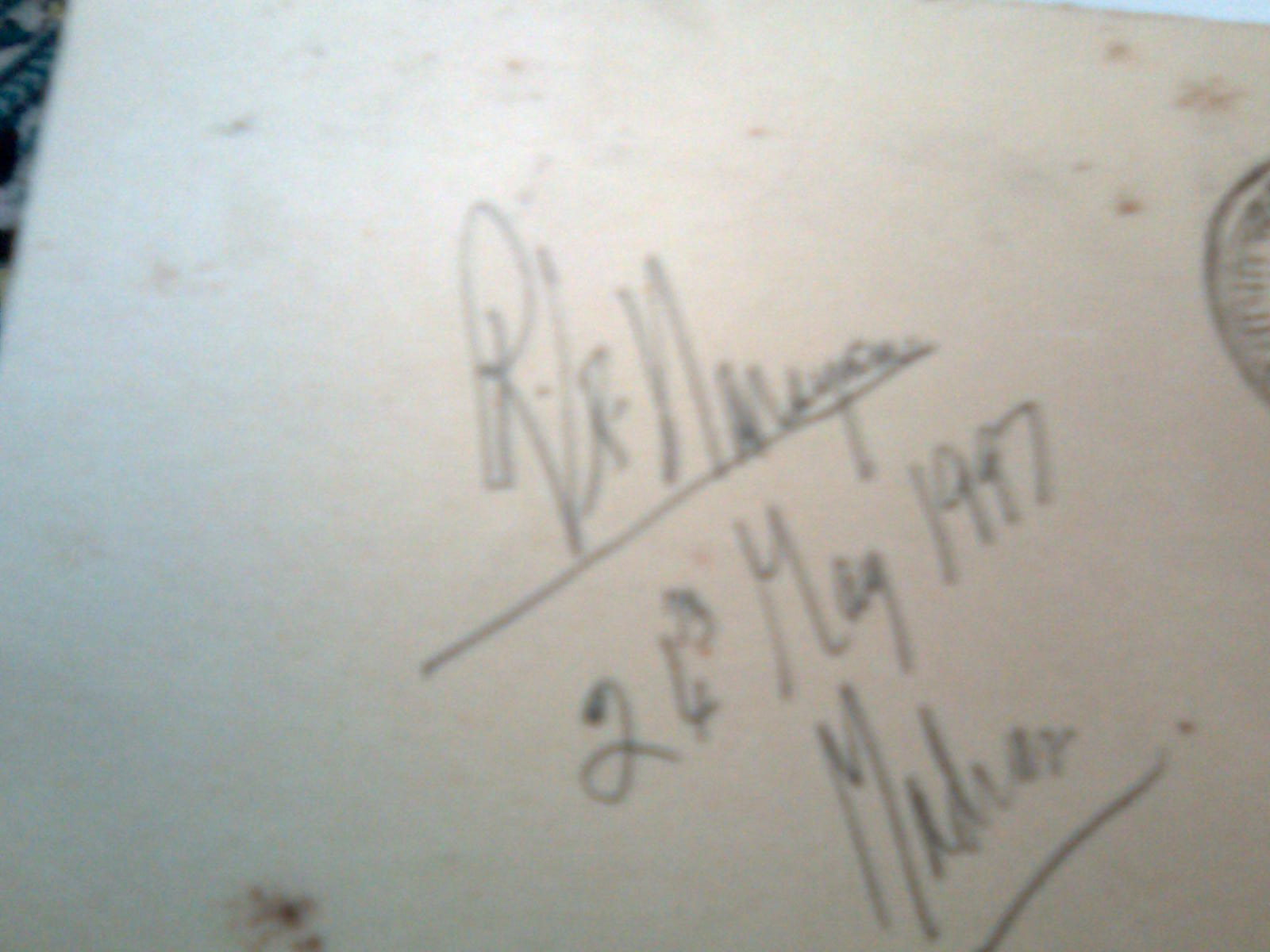

Rasipuram Krishnaswami Narayanaswami (10 October 1906 – 13 May 2001), better known as R. K. Narayan, was an Indian writer and novelist known for his work set in the fictional South Indian town of Malgudi. He was a leading author of early Indian literature in English along with Mulk Raj Anand and Raja Rao. In 1980, he received the AC Benson Medal from the Royal Society of Literature, and in 1981 he was made an Honorary Member of the American Academy and Institute of Arts and Letters.

Narayan is the author of more than 200 novels, as well as short stories and plays. His work portrays his characters' social context and everyday life, often in between traditional life and modernity. He has been compared to William Faulkner, who similarly set much of his work in a locale of his own invention and explored ordinary life with humor and compassion. Narayan's short stories have been compared to those of Guy de Maupassant for their compressed narratives.

In a career that spanned over 60 years, Narayan received many awards and honours, including the AC Benson Medal from the Royal Society of Literature, the Padma Vibhushan and the Padma Bhushan, India's second- and third-highest civilian awards, and in 1994 the Sahitya Akademi Fellowship, the highest honour of India's National Academy of Letters. He was also nominated to the Rajya Sabha, the upper house of the Indian Parliament.

== Life and career ==
=== Early life ===
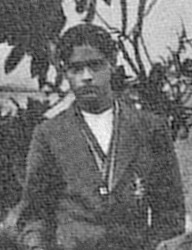
R. K. Narayan, c. 1925–26

R. K. Narayan was born in a Tamil Brahmin family on 10 October 1906 in Madras (now Chennai, Tamil Nadu), British India. He had five brothers and two sisters. Narayan was the second-oldest brother; his younger brother Ramachandran became an editor at Gemini Studios, and his youngest brother, Laxman, a cartoonist. His father was a school headmaster, and Narayan did some of his studies at his father's school. As his father's job entailed frequent transfers, Narayan spent a part of his childhood under the care of his maternal grandmother, Parvati. During this time, his best friends and playmates were a peacock and a mischievous monkey.

His grandmother gave him the nickname Kunjappa, a name that stuck in his family circles. She taught him arithmetic, mythology, classical Indian music and Sanskrit. According to Laxman, the family mostly conversed in English, and grammatical errors were frowned upon. While living with his grandmother, Narayan studied at several schools in Madras, including the Lutheran Mission School in Purasawalkam, C.R.C. High School, and the Madras Christian College Higher Secondary School. Narayan was an avid reader, and his early literary diet included Dickens, Wodehouse, Arthur Conan Doyle and Thomas Hardy. When he was 12 years old, Narayan participated in a pro-independence march, for which he was reprimanded by his uncle; the family was apolitical and considered all governments wicked.

Narayan moved to Mysore to live with his family when his father was transferred to the Maharaja's College High School. The school's well-stocked library and his father's own fed his reading habit, and he began to write. After completing high school, Narayan failed the university entrance examination and spent a year at home reading and writing; he passed the examination in 1926 and joined Maharaja College of Mysore. It took Narayan four years to obtain his bachelor's degree, a year longer than usual. After being persuaded by a friend that taking a master's degree (M.A.) would kill his interest in literature, he briefly worked as a schoolteacher but quit in protest when the school headmaster asked him to substitute for the physical training master. The experience convinced Narayan that the only career for him was in writing, and he decided to stay at home and write novels. His first published work was a book review of Development of Maritime Laws of 17th-Century England. Subsequently, he started writing local interest stories for English newspapers and magazines. Although the writing did not pay much (his income for the first year was nine rupees and twelve annas), he had a regular life and few needs, and his family and friends respected and supported his unorthodox career choice. In 1930, Narayan wrote his first novel, Swami and Friends, an effort ridiculed by his uncle and rejected by a string of publishers. With this book, Narayan created Malgudi, a town that creatively reproduced the social sphere of the country; while it ignored the limits imposed by colonial rule, it also reflected the sociopolitical changes of British and post-independence India.

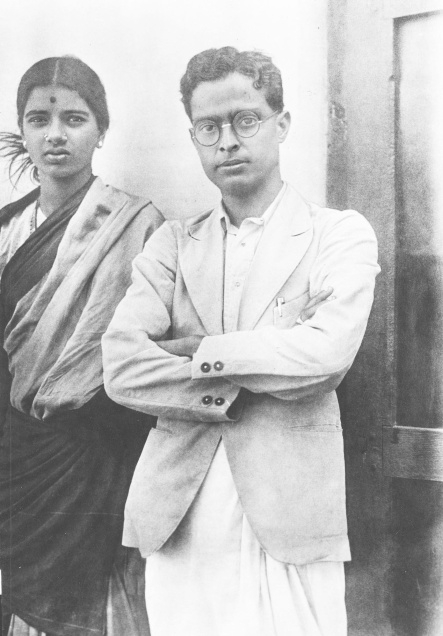
R. K. Narayan with his wife Rajam, c. 1935

While vacationing at his sister's house in Coimbatore in 1933, Narayan met and fell in love with Rajam, a 15-year-old girl who lived nearby. Despite many astrological and financial obstacles, Narayan gained Rajam's father's permission to marry her. Narayan then became a reporter for the Madras-based paper The Justice, dedicated to the rights of non-Brahmins. The publishers were thrilled to have Narayan, a Brahmin Iyer, espousing their cause. The job brought him in contact with a wide variety of people and issues. Earlier, Narayan had sent the manuscript of Swami and Friends to a friend at Oxford, and around this time the friend showed the manuscript to Graham Greene. Greene recommended the book to his publisher, and it was published in 1935. Greene also counselled Narayan to shorten his name for English-speaking readers. The book is semi-autobiographical, drawing on many incidents from Narayan's childhood. Reviews were favourable but sales were few. Narayan's next novel, The Bachelor of Arts (1937), was inspired in part by his experiences at college, and depicts a rebellious adolescent becoming a rather well-adjusted adult; it was published by a different publisher, again on Greene's recommendation. His third novel, The Dark Room (1938), is about domestic disharmony, portraying a man as the oppressor and a woman as the victim in a marriage, and was published by yet another publisher; this book also received good reviews. In 1937, Narayan's father died, and Narayan was forced to accept a commission from the government of Mysore as he was not making any money.

In his first three books, Narayan highlights the problems with certain socially accepted practices. The first book focuses on the plight of students, punishments of caning in the classroom, and the associated shame. The concept of horoscope-matching in Hindu marriages and the emotional toll it levies on the bride and groom is covered in the second. In the third, Narayan depicts a wife putting up with her husband's antics and attitudes.

Rajam died of typhoid in 1939. Her death affected Narayan deeply and he was depressed for a long time. Their daughter, Hema, was three years old when Rajam died. Narayan never remarried. His bereavement inspired his next novel, The English Teacher. Like his first two books, it is autobiographical, but more so, and completes an unintentional thematic trilogy that begins with Swami and Friends and The Bachelor of Arts. In interviews, Narayan acknowledged that The English Teacher was almost entirely autobiographical, with different names for the characters and a change of setting to Malgudi; he also said the emotions in the book reflected his own at the time of Rajam's death.

In 1940, bolstered by his success, Narayan tried his hand at a journal, Indian Thought. With the help of his uncle, a car salesman, Narayan got more than 1,000 subscribers in Madras city alone. But the venture did not last long, due to Narayan's inability to manage it, and it ceased publication within a year. His first collection of short stories, Malgudi Days, was published in 1942, followed by The English Teacher in 1945. In between, being cut off from England due to the war, Narayan started his own publishing company, naming it (again) Indian Thought Publications; the company was a success and is still active, now managed by his granddaughter. Soon, with a devoted readership from New York to Moscow, Narayan's books started selling well, and in 1948 he started building a house on the outskirts of Mysore; it was completed in 1953. Around this period, Narayan wrote the screenplay for the 1947 Gemini Studios film Miss Malini, the only screenplay he wrote that was filmed.

=== The busy years ===
After The English Teacher, Narayan's writings took a more imaginative and creative external style compared to the semi-autobiographical tone of the earlier novels. His next effort was the first book exhibiting this modified approach. However, it still draws from some of his own experiences, particularly the aspect of starting his own journal; he also makes a marked movement from his earlier novels by intermixing biographical events. Soon after, he published The Financial Expert, considered to be his masterpiece and hailed as one of the most original works of fiction in 1951. The inspiration for the novel was a true story about a financial genius, Margayya, related to him by his brother. The next novel, Waiting for the Mahatma, loosely based on a fictional visit to Malgudi by Mahatma Gandhi, deals with the protagonist's romantic feelings for a woman, when he attends the discourses of the visiting Mahatma. The woman, named Bharti, is a loose parody of Bharati, the personification of India and the focus of Gandhi's discourses. While the novel includes significant references to the Indian independence movement, the focus is on the life of the ordinary individual, narrated with Narayan's usual dose of irony.

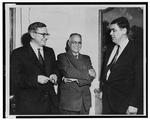
Lyle Blair of Michigan State University Press (Narayan's U.S. publisher), Narayan and Anthony West of The New Yorker

In 1953, his works were published in the United States for the first time, by Michigan State University Press, who later (in 1958), relinquished the rights to Viking Press. While Narayan's writings often bring out the anomalies in social structures and views, he was himself a traditionalist; in February 1956, Narayan arranged his daughter's wedding following all orthodox Hindu rituals. After the wedding, Narayan began travelling occasionally, continuing to write at least 1500 words a day even while on the road. The Guide was written while he was visiting the United States in 1956 on the Rockefeller Fellowship. While in the U.S., Narayan maintained a daily journal that was to later serve as the foundation for his book My Dateless Diary. Around this time, on a visit to England, Narayan met his friend and mentor Graham Greene for the first and only time. On his return to India, The Guide was published; the book is the most representative of Narayan's writing skills and elements, ambivalent in expression, coupled with a riddle-like conclusion. The book won him the Sahitya Akademi Award in 1960.

Occasionally, Narayan was known to give form to his thoughts by way of essays, some published in newspapers and journals, others not. Next Sunday (1960), was a collection of such conversational essays, and his first work to be published as a book. Soon after that, My Dateless Diary, describing experiences from his 1956 visit to the United States, was published. Also included in this collection was an essay about the writing of The Guide.

Narayan's next novel, The Man-Eater of Malgudi, was published in 1961. The book was reviewed as having a narrative that is a classical art form of comedy, with delicate control. After the launch of this book, the restless Narayan once again took to travelling, and visited the U.S. and Australia. He spent three weeks in Adelaide, Sydney and Melbourne giving lectures on Indian literature. The trip was funded by a fellowship from the Australian Writers' Group. By this time Narayan had also achieved significant success, both literary and financial. He had a large house in Mysore, and wrote in a study with no fewer than eight windows; he drove a new Mercedes-Benz, a luxury in India at that time, to visit his daughter who had moved to Coimbatore after her marriage. With his success, both within India and abroad, Narayan started writing columns for magazines and newspapers including The Hindu and The Atlantic.

In 1964, Narayan published his first mythological work, Gods, Demons and Others, a collection of rewritten and translated short stories from Hindu epics. Like many of his other works, this book was illustrated by his younger brother R. K. Laxman. The stories included were a selective list, chosen on the basis of powerful protagonists, so that the impact would be lasting, irrespective of the reader's contextual knowledge. Once again, after the book launch, Narayan took to travelling abroad. In an earlier essay, he had written about the Americans wanting to understand spirituality from him, and during this visit, Swedish-American actress Greta Garbo accosted him on the topic, despite his denial of any knowledge.

Narayan's next published work was the 1967 novel, The Vendor of Sweets. It was inspired in part by his American visits and consists of extreme characterizations of both the Indian and American stereotypes, drawing on the many cultural differences. However, while it displays his characteristic comedy and narrative, the book was reviewed as lacking in depth. This year, Narayan travelled to England, where he received the first of his honorary doctorates from the University of Leeds. The next few years were a quiet period for him. He published his next book, a collection of short stories, A Horse and Two Goats, in 1970. Meanwhile, Narayan remembered a promise made to his dying uncle in 1938, and started translating the Kamba Ramayanam to English. The Ramayana was published in 1973, after five years of work. Almost immediately after publishing The Ramayana, Narayan started working on a condensed translation of the Sanskrit epic, the Mahabharata. While he was researching and writing the epic, he also published another book, The Painter of Signs (1977). The Painter of Signs is a bit longer than a novella and makes a marked change from Narayan's other works, as he deals with hitherto unaddressed subjects such as sex, although the development of the protagonist's character is very similar to his earlier creations. The Mahabharata was published in 1978.

=== The later years ===
Narayan was commissioned by the government of Karnataka to write a book to promote tourism in the state. The work was published as part of a larger government publication in the late 1970s He thought it deserved better, and republished it as The Emerald Route (Indian Thought Publications, 1980). The book contains his personal perspective on the local history and heritage, but being bereft of his characters and creations, it misses his enjoyable narrative. The same year, he was elected as an honorary member of the American Academy of Arts and Letters and won the AC Benson Medal from the Royal Society of Literature. Around the same time, Narayan's works were translated to Chinese for the first time.

In 1983, Narayan published his next novel, A Tiger for Malgudi, about a tiger and its relationship with humans. His next novel, Talkative Man, published in 1986, was the tale of an aspiring journalist from Malgudi. During this time, he also published two collections of short stories: Malgudi Days (1982), a revised edition including the original book and some other stories, and Under the Banyan Tree and Other Stories, a new collection. In 1987, he completed A Writer's Nightmare, another collection of essays about topics as diverse as the caste system, Nobel prize winners, love, and monkeys. The collection included essays he had written for newspapers and magazines since 1958.

Living alone in Mysore, Narayan developed an interest in agriculture. He bought an acre of agricultural land and tried his hand at farming. He was also prone to walking to the market every afternoon, not so much for buying things, but to interact with the people. In a typical afternoon stroll, he would stop every few steps to greet and converse with shopkeepers and others, most likely gathering material for his next book.

In 1980, Narayan was nominated to the Rajya Sabha, the upper house of the Indian Parliament, for his contributions to literature. During his entire six-year term, he was focused on one issue—the plight of school children, especially the heavy load of school books and the negative effect of the system on a child's creativity, which was something that he first highlighted in his debut novel, Swami and Friends. His inaugural speech was focused on this particular problem, and resulted in the formation of a committee chaired by Prof. Yash Pal, to recommend changes to the school educational system.

In 1990, he published his next novel, The World of Nagaraj, also set in Malgudi. Narayan's age shows in this work as he appears to skip narrative details that he would have included if this were written earlier in his career. Soon after he finished the novel, Narayan fell ill and moved to Madras to be close to his daughter's family. A few years after his move, in 1994, his daughter died of cancer and his granddaughter Bhuvaneswari (Minnie) started taking care of him in addition to managing Indian Thought Publications. Narayan then published his final book, Grandmother's Tale. The book is an autobiographical novella, about his great-grandmother who travelled far and wide to find her husband, who ran away shortly after their marriage. The story was narrated to him by his grandmother, when he was a child.

During his final years, Narayan, ever fond of conversation, would spend almost every evening with N. Ram, the publisher of The Hindu, drinking coffee and talking about various topics until well past midnight. Despite his fondness of meeting and talking to people, he stopped giving interviews. The apathy towards interviews was the result of an interview with Time, after which Narayan had to spend a few days in the hospital, as he was dragged around the city to take photographs that were never used in the article.

In May 2001, Narayan was hospitalised. A few hours before he was to be put on a ventilator, he was planning on writing his next novel, a story about a grandfather. As he was always very selective about his choice of notebooks, he asked N. Ram to get him one. However, Narayan did not get better and never started the novel. He died a few days later on 13 May 2001, in Chennai at the age of 94.

== Literary review ==
=== Writing style ===
Narayan's writing technique was unpretentious with a natural element of humour about it. It focused on ordinary people, reminding the reader of next-door neighbours, cousins and the like, thereby providing a greater ability to relate to the topic. Unlike his national contemporaries, he was able to write about the intricacies of Indian society without having to modify his characteristic simplicity to confirm to trends and fashions in fiction writing. He also employed the use of nuanced dialogic prose with gentle Tamil overtones based on the nature of his characters. Critics have considered Narayan to be the Indian Chekhov, due to the similarities in their writings, the simplicity and the gentle beauty and humour in tragic situations. Greene considered Narayan to be more similar to Chekhov than any Indian writer. Anthony West of The New Yorker considered Narayan's writings to be of the realism variety of Nikolai Gogol.

According to Pulitzer Prize winner Jhumpa Lahiri, Narayan's short stories have the same captivating feeling as his novels, with most of them less than ten pages long, and taking about as many minutes to read. She adds that Narayan provides the reader something novelists struggle to achieve in hundreds more pages: a complete insight to the lives of his character between the title sentence and the ends. These characteristics and abilities led Lahiri to classify him as belonging to the pantheon of short-story geniuses that include O. Henry, Frank O'Connor and Flannery O'Connor. Lahiri also compares him to Guy de Maupassant for their ability to compress the narrative without losing the story, and the common themes of middle-class life written with an unyielding and unpitying vision. V. S. Naipaul noted that he "wrote from deep within his community", and did not, in his treatment of characters, "put his people on display".

Critics have noted that Narayan's writings tend to be more descriptive and less analytical; the objective style, rooted in a detached spirit, providing for a more authentic and realistic narration. His attitude, coupled with his perception of life, provided a unique ability to fuse characters and actions, and an ability to use ordinary events to create a connection in the mind of the reader. A significant contributor to his writing style was his creation of Malgudi, a stereotypical small town, where the standard norms of superstition and tradition apply.

Narayan's writing style was often compared to that of William Faulkner since both their works brought out the humour and energy of ordinary life while displaying compassionate humanism. The similarities also extended to their juxtaposing of the demands of society against the confusions of individuality. Although their approach to subjects was similar, their methods were different; Faulkner was rhetorical and illustrated his points with immense prose while Narayan was very simple and realistic, capturing the elements all the same.

=== Malgudi ===
Malgudi is a fictional fully urban town in southern India, conjured by Narayan. He created the town in September 1930, on Vijayadashami, an auspicious day to start new efforts and thus chosen for him by his grandfather. As he mentioned in a later interview to his biographers Susan and N. Ram, in his mind, he first saw a railway station, and slowly the name Malgudi came to him. The fictional town of Malgudi was first introduced in Swami and Friends.

The town was created with an impeccable historical record, dating to the Ramayana days when it was noted that Lord Rama passed through; it was also said that the Buddha visited the town during his travels. While Narayan never provided strict physical constraints for the town, he allowed it to form shape with events in various stories, becoming a reference point for the future. Dr James M. Fennelly, a scholar of Narayan's works, created a map of Malgudi based on the fictional descriptors of the town from the many books and stories.

Malgudi evolved with the changing political landscape of India. In the 1980s, when the nationalistic fervor in India dictated the changing of British names of towns and localities and removal of British landmarks, Malgudi's mayor and city council removed the long-standing statue of Frederick Lawley, one of Malgudi's early residents. However, when the Historical Societies showed proof that Lawley was strong in his support of the Indian independence movement, the council was forced to undo all their earlier actions. A good comparison to Malgudi, a place that Greene characterised as "more familiar than Battersea or Euston Road", is Faulkner's Yoknapatawpha County. Also, like Faulkner's, when one looks at Narayan's works, the town gets a better definition through the many different novels and stories.

=== Critical reception ===
Narayan first broke through with the help of Graham Greene who, upon reading Swami, the Tate, took it upon himself to work as Narayan's agent for the book. He was also significant in changing the title to the more appropriate Swami and Friends, and in finding publishers for Narayan's next few books. While Narayan's early works were not commercial successes, other authors of the time began to notice him.

Somerset Maugham, on a trip to Mysore in 1938, had asked to meet Narayan, but not enough people had heard of him to actually effect the meeting. Maugham subsequently read Narayan's The Dark Room, and wrote to him expressing his admiration. Another contemporary writer who took a liking to Narayan's early works was E. M. Forster, an author who shared his dry and humorous narrative, so much so that Narayan was labeled the "South Indian E. M. Forster" by critics. Despite his popularity with the reading public and fellow writers, Narayan's work has not received the same amount of critical exploration accorded to other writers of his stature.

Narayan's success in the United States came a little later, when Michigan State University Press started publishing his books. His first visit to the country was on a fellowship from the Rockefeller Foundation, and he lectured at various universities including Michigan State University and the University of California, Berkeley. Around this time, John Updike noticed his work and compared Narayan to Charles Dickens. In a review of Narayan's works published in The New Yorker, Updike called him a writer of a vanishing breed—the writer as a citizen; one who identifies completely with his subjects and with a belief in the significance of humanity.

Having published many novels, essays and short stories, Narayan is credited with bringing Indian writing to the rest of the world. While he has been regarded as one of India's greatest writers of the twentieth century, critics have also described his writings with adjectives such as charming, harmless and benign. The Financial Expert was hailed as one of the most original works of 1951 and Sahitya Academy Award winner The Guide was adapted for the film (winning a Filmfare Award for Best Film) and for Broadway.

Narayan has also come in for criticism from later writers, particularly of Indian origin, who have classed his writings as having a pedestrian style with a shallow vocabulary and a narrow vision. According to Shashi Tharoor, Narayan's subjects are similar to those of Jane Austen as they both deal with a very small section of society. However, he adds that while Austen's prose was able to take those subjects beyond ordinariness, Narayan's was not. A similar opinion is held by Shashi Deshpande who characterizes Narayan's writings as pedestrian and naive because of the simplicity of his language and diction, combined with the lack of any complexity in the emotions and behaviours of his characters.

A general perception on Narayan was that he did not involve himself or his writings with the politics or problems of India, as mentioned by V. S. Naipaul in one of his columns. However, according to Wyatt Mason of The New Yorker, although Narayan's writings seem simple and display a lack of interest in politics, he delivers his narrative with an artful and deceptive technique when dealing with such subjects and does not entirely avoid them, rather letting the words play in the reader's mind. K. R. Srinivasa Iyengar, former vice-chancellor of Andhra University, says that Narayan wrote about political topics only in the context of his subjects, quite unlike his compatriot Mulk Raj Anand who dealt with the political structures and problems of the time. Paul Brians, in his book Modern South Asian Literature in English, says that the fact that Narayan completely ignored British rule and focused on the private lives of his characters is a political statement on its own, declaring his independence from the influence of colonialism.

In the west, Narayan's simplicity of writing was well received. One of his biographers, William Walsh, wrote of his narrative as a comedic art with an inclusive vision informed by the transience and illusion of human action. Multiple Booker nominee Anita Desai classes his writings as "compassionate realism" where the cardinal sins are unkindness and immodesty. According to Mason, in Narayan's works, the individual is not a private entity, but rather a public one and this concept is an innovation that can be called his own. In addition to his early works being among the most important English-language fiction from India, with this innovation, he provided his western readers the first works in English to be infused with an eastern and Hindu existential perspective. Mason also holds the view that Edmund Wilson's assessment of Walt Whitman, "He does not write editorials on events but describes his actual feelings", applies equally to Narayan.

== Awards and honours ==
Narayan won numerous awards during the course of his literary career. He won his first major award, in 1960, the Sahitya Akademi Award for his book "The Guide". When the book was made into a film, he received the Filmfare Award for the best story. In 1964, he received the Padma Bhushan during the Republic Day honours. In 1980, he was awarded the AC Benson Medal by the (British) Royal Society of Literature, of which he was an honorary member. In 1982, he was elected an honorary member of the American Academy of Arts and Letters. He was nominated for the Nobel Prize in Literature multiple times, but never won the honour. In 1986, he was honoured by Rajyotsava Prashasti from Government of Karnataka.

Recognition also came in the form of honorary doctorates conferred by the University of Leeds (1967), Delhi University (1973) and the University of Mysore (1976). Toward the end of his career, Narayan was nominated to the upper house of the Indian Parliament for a six-year term starting in 1989, for his contributions to Indian literature. A year before his death, in 2000, he was awarded India's second-highest civilian honour, the Padma Vibhushan.

== Legacy ==
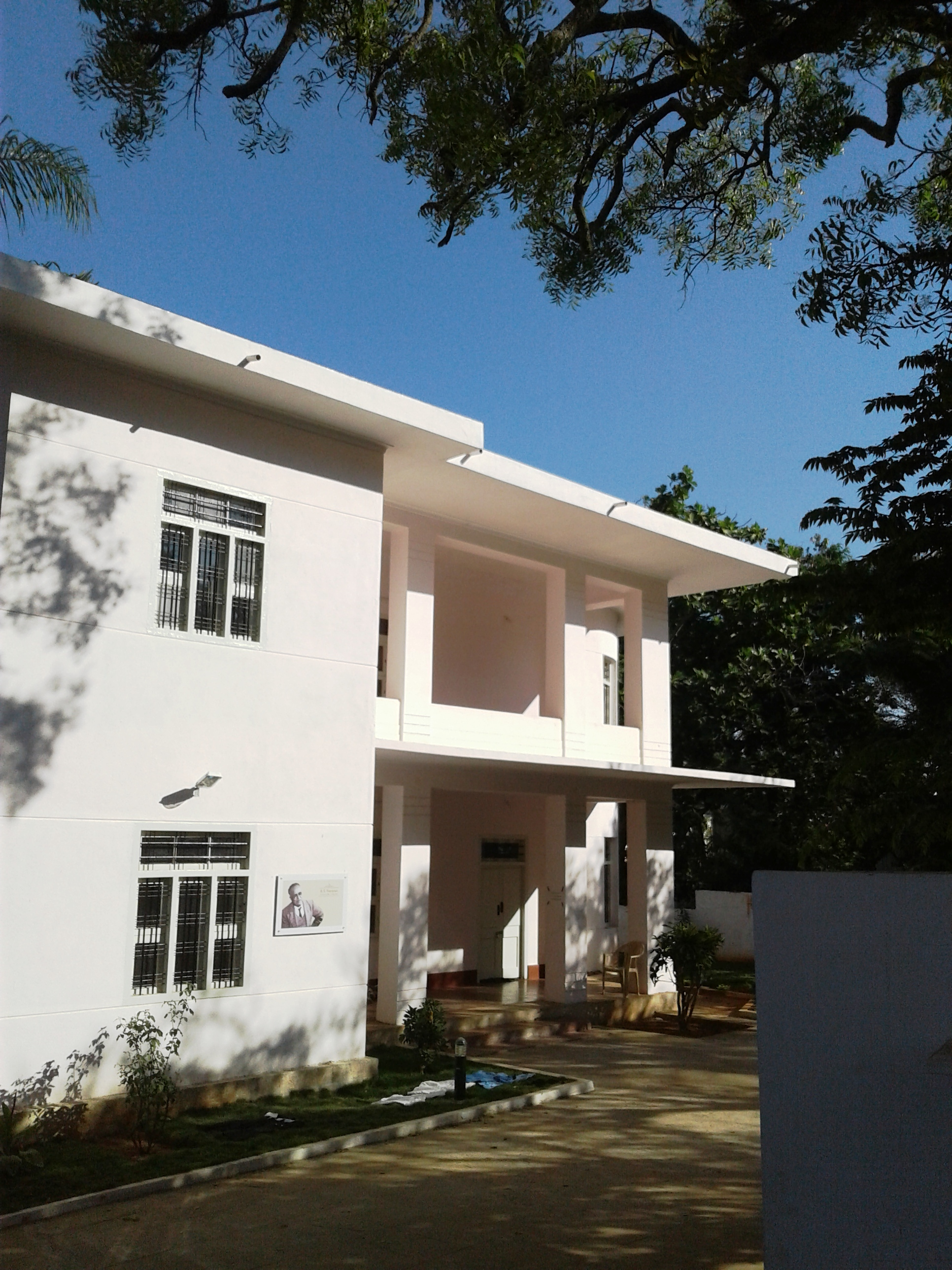
R. K. Narayan Museum in Mysore

Narayan's greatest achievement was making India accessible to the outside world through his literature. He is regarded as one of the three leading English language Indian fiction writers, along with Raja Rao and Mulk Raj Anand. He gave his readers something to look forward to with Malgudi and its residents and is considered to be one of the best novelists India has ever produced. He brought small-town India to his audience in a manner that was both believable and experiential. Malgudi was not just a fictional town in India, but one teeming with characters, each with their own idiosyncrasies and attitudes, making the situation as familiar to the reader as if it were their own backyard. In 2014, Google commemorated Narayan's 108th birthday by featuring a doodle showing him behind a copy of Malgudi Days.

"Whom next shall I meet in Malgudi? That is the thought that comes to me when I close a novel of Mr Narayan's. I do not wait for another novel. I wait to go out of my door into those loved and shabby streets and see with excitement and a certainty of pleasure a stranger approaching, past the bank, the cinema, the haircutting saloon, a stranger who will greet me I know with some unexpected and revealing phrase that will open a door on to yet another human existence."

— Graham Greene

In mid-2016, Narayan's former home in Mysore was converted into a museum in his honour. The original structure was built in 1952. The house and surrounding land were acquired by real estate contractors to raze down and build an apartment complex in its stead, but citizens groups and the Mysore City Corporation stepped in to repurchase the building and land and then restore it, subsequently converting it into a museum. The museum admission is free of charge and it is open between 10.00 am and 5.00 pm except on Tuesdays.

On 8 November 2019, his book Swami and Friends was chosen as one of BBC's 100 Novels That Shaped Our World.

== Works ==
Novels

- Swami and Friends (1935, Hamish Hamilton)
- The Bachelor of Arts (1937, Thomas Nelson)
- The Dark Room (1938, Eyre)
- The English Teacher (1945, Eyre)
- Mr. Sampath (1949, Eyre)
- The Financial Expert (1952, Methuen)
- Waiting for the Mahatma (1955, Methuen)
- The Guide (1958, Methuen)
- The Man-Eater of Malgudi (1961, Viking)
- The Vendor of Sweets (1967, The Bodley Head)
- The Painter of Signs (1976, Heinemann)
- A Tiger for Malgudi (1983, Heinemann)
- Talkative Man (1986, Heinemann)
- The World of Nagaraj (1990, Heinemann)
- Grandmother's Tale (1992, Indian Thought Publications)

Non-fiction

- Next Sunday (1960, Indian Thought Publications)
- My Dateless Diary (1960, Indian Thought Publications)
- My Days (1974, Viking)
- Reluctant Guru (1974, Orient Paperbacks)
- The Emerald Route (1980, Indian Thought Publications)
- A Writer's Nightmare (1988, Penguin Books)
- A Story-Teller's World (1989, Penguin Books)
- The Writerly Life (2001, Penguin Books India)
- Mysore (1944, second edition, Indian Thought Publications)

Mythology

- Gods, Demons and Others (1964, Viking)
- The Ramayana (1972, Chatto & Windus)
- The Mahabharata (1978, Heinemann)

Short story collections

- Malgudi Days (1943, Indian Thought Publications)
- An Astrologer's Day and Other Stories (1947, Indian Thought Publications)
- Lawley Road and Other Stories (1956, Indian Thought Publications)
- A Horse and Two Goats (1970)
- Under the Banyan Tree and Other Stories (1985)
- The Grandmother's Tale and Selected Stories (1994, Viking)

=== Adaptations ===
Narayan's book The Guide was adapted into the 1965 Hindi film Guide, directed by Vijay Anand. An English-language version was also released. Narayan was not happy with the way the film was made and its deviation from the book; he wrote a column in Life magazine, "The Misguided Guide," criticising the film. The book was also adapted to a Broadway play by Harvey Breit and Patricia Rinehart, and was staged at Hudson Theatre in 1968 with Zia Mohyeddin playing the lead role and a music score by Ravi Shankar.

Mr. Sampath was made into a 1952 Hindi film of the same name with Padmini and Motilal and produced by Gemini Studios. Another novel, The Financial Expert, was made into the Kannada film Banker Margayya (1983). Swami and Friends, The Vendor of Sweets and some of Narayan's short stories were adapted by actor-director Shankar Nag into the television series Malgudi Days that started in 1986. Narayan was happy with the adaptations and complimented the producers for sticking to the storyline in the books.

== See also ==
- List of Indian writers
