= A Tiger for Malgudi =

1983 novel by R. K. Narayan

- First US edition
- Author: R. K. Narayan
- Language: English
- Publisher: Viking Press (US); Heinemann (UK)
- Publication date: 1983
- Publication place: India
- Media type: Print
- Pages: 175
- ISBN: 0-670-71260-4

A Tiger for Malgudi is a 1983 novel by R. K. Narayan told by a tiger in the first person. Deeply moving is the attachment of the tiger to the monk and the monk's care for the tiger. R. K. Narayan consulted with noted tiger expert K. Ullas Karanth on the writing of this novel. Narayan used the teaching of Buddha's enlightenment in this particular novel. The novel is set in the fictional town of Malgudi.

== Plot ==
The tiger recounts his story of capture by a circus owner, but he never tried to escape. He lived freely in the wild jungles of India in his youth. He mates and has a litter with a tigress, and raises a litter until one day he finds that hunters have captured and killed his entire family. He exacts revenge by attacking and eating the cattle and livestock of nearby villages, but is captured by poachers. He is sent to a circus in Malgudi, where a harsh animal trainer known only as "the Captain" starves him and forces him to do tricks in the circus. He lives in captivity successfully for some time, but eventually his wild instincts overcome him and he mauls and kills the Captain. After an extended rampage through the town, he is recaptured, but this time voluntarily by a monk/renunciant with whom he befriends and finds peace on the hills. The monk, called the Master, later realizing his own days are coming to an end, donates the elderly tiger to the local zoo, where he is cared for, admired by onlookers, and passes his days. He is looked at by many children and realizes that he has done something to make humans happy.

== Characters ==
- Raja, a tiger
- Captain, the owner of Grand Malgudi Circus
- Rita, Captain’s wife
- Madan, a film producer and director
- Jaggu, the actor
- Alphonso, a hunter and poacher
- Master, a monk in Malgudi
- Jayaraj , is a frame maker

== Background ==
In his introduction to the novel, Narayan mentions that the idea of the novel occurred to him when he once read about a monk moving around with a pet tiger during the Kumbh Mela festival in Allahabad. He was also inspired by reports of lasting friendships between tigers and human beings which became a major theme of the novel. However, what decided for him to begin writing the novel was a bookmark he saw with the picture of a tiger that said, “I’d love to get into a good book”.
