= My Days =

1974 autobiography of R.K. Narayan

First UK edition (publ. Chatto & Windus)

My Days (1974) is an autobiography by R. K. Narayan. It tells the story of Narayan's upbringing. My Days is an autobiography which starts with his childhood spent in his grandmother's home in Chennai.
