= Malgudi =

Fictional Indian town in the works of R. K. Narayan

- First appearance: Swami and Friends (1935)
- Created by: R. K. Narayan

In-universe information
- Type: Town
- Location: Karnataka
- Country: India

Malgudi (/mɑːlɡʊdɪ/) is a fictional town located in Agumbe situated in the Shivamogga district of the Indian state of Karnataka in the novels and short stories of R. K. Narayan. It forms the setting for most of Narayan's works. Starting with his first novel, Swami and Friends, all but one of his fifteen novels and most of his short stories take place here. Malgudi was a portmanteau of two Bengaluru localities - Malleshwara and Basavana Gudi.

Narayan has successfully portrayed Malgudi as a microcosm of India. Malgudi was created, as mentioned in Malgudi Days, by Sir Fredrick Lawley, a fictional British officer in the 19th century by combining and developing a few villages. The character of Sir Fredrick Lawley may have been based on Arthur Lawley, the Governor of Madras in 1905. Swami and Friends also seems to have taken place during the Swadeshi and boycott movement against the British. While some commentators have seen Malgudi as representing an unchanging, quintessential India, John Thieme (2007) takes the view that "far from serving as a metonym for a settled, secure India, the town is the product of a particular coming together of social, religious and above all psychic forces, which undergo transformations as they interact with one another". He argues that Malgudi is "[b]uilt on the fault-lines where classical Hindu discourse and the more 'realistic', supposedly Western form of the novel collide" and as such "it ushers new forms of fiction into being".

== Geography and origins ==
Malgudi is located on the banks of the fictional river Sarayu, near the also-fictional Mempi forest, on the border of the states of Mysore and Madras and a few hours away from Madras.

Malgudi was a portmanteau of two Bangalore localities—Malleshwaram and Basavanagudi, the story is apocryphal. He created the town in September 1930, on Vijayadashami, an auspicious day to start new efforts and thus chosen for him by his grandmother. As he mentioned in a later interview to his biographers Susan and N. Ram, in his mind, he first saw a railway station, and slowly the name Malgudi came to him.

== Localities and landmarks ==
=== Sarayu River ===
Malgudi is located on the banks of the river Sarayu. In Swami and Friends, Swami, Mani and Rajam spend most of their evenings playing or chatting by the river. In The Guide, holy-man Raju fasts on the banks of the dry river Sarayu, praying for the rains to come. When Mahatma Gandhi visits Malgudi, the meetings and speeches are held right on the banks of river Sarayu.

=== Streets and neighbourhoods ===
Market Street is the central street of Malgudi, the location of several big shops including Bombay Anand Bhavan and Truth Printing Works. Kabir Street is the residence of the elite of Malgudi, while Lawley Extension is a new upcoming lane housing the rich and the influential. Elleman Street, home to the oil-mongers, is the last street and beyond it lies the river Sarayu. Other streets include Grove Street, Kalighat Lane and Vinayak Muduli Street.

Between Elleman Street and the river lie Mallappa's Grove and the cremation ground. The Untouchables and sweepers live on the lower banks of the river.

=== Buildings ===
Palace Talkies was built in 1935 to replace the old Variety Hall. Albert Mission School and Albert Mission College are the more popular educational institutions. There are also the board school and the town elementary schools.

=== Other landmarks ===
Malgudi has a small railway station which in many episodes, is central to the storyline. The main hospital of Malgudi is Malgudi Medical Centre (MMC). The statue of Sir Fredrick, seated on a horse, forms another major landmark. Another important place is The Board less, a small restaurant without any board. Boardless is a centre of discussion for current events in Malgudi.

=== Mempi Forest ===
Mempi forest is on the other side of Sarayu. It houses many hills and caves. Animals to be found there include tigers, members of the deer family, langurs and water buffalos.

== Conceptualization ==
Various critics compare Narayan's Malgudi with Thomas Hardy's Wessex or William Faulkner's Yoknapatawpha. It was a town created from his own experiences, his childhood, his upbringing. The people in it were people he met every day. He thus created a place which every Indian could relate to. A place, where, in the words of Graham Greene (from the introduction to The Financial Expert), you could go "into those loved and shabby streets and see with excitement and a certainty of pleasure a stranger approaching past the bank, the cinema, the hair cutting saloon, a stranger who will greet us, we know, with some unexpected and revealing phrase that will open the door to yet another human existence."

== In contemporary culture ==
Malgudi Days a 1986 Indian television series directed by Kannada actor and director Shankar Nag, based on the eponymous works of R.K. Narayan was mostly shot near Agumbe in Shimoga District, Karnataka. Some episodes, however, were also shot at Bengaluru and Devarayanadurga in Tumakuru District, Karnataka.

The concept of Malgudi as an "idyllic spot located in South India" seems to have taken root in popular imagination. Some restaurants offering South Indian fare go by the name or extensions of "Malgudi." The Shyam Group operates Malgudi restaurants in Chennai, Bengaluru and Hyderabad. A restaurant named "Malgudi Junction" is located in Kolkata.

== See also ==
- Malgudi Days
- Masinagudi
