= Culture of Mysore =

Cultural capital of Karnataka

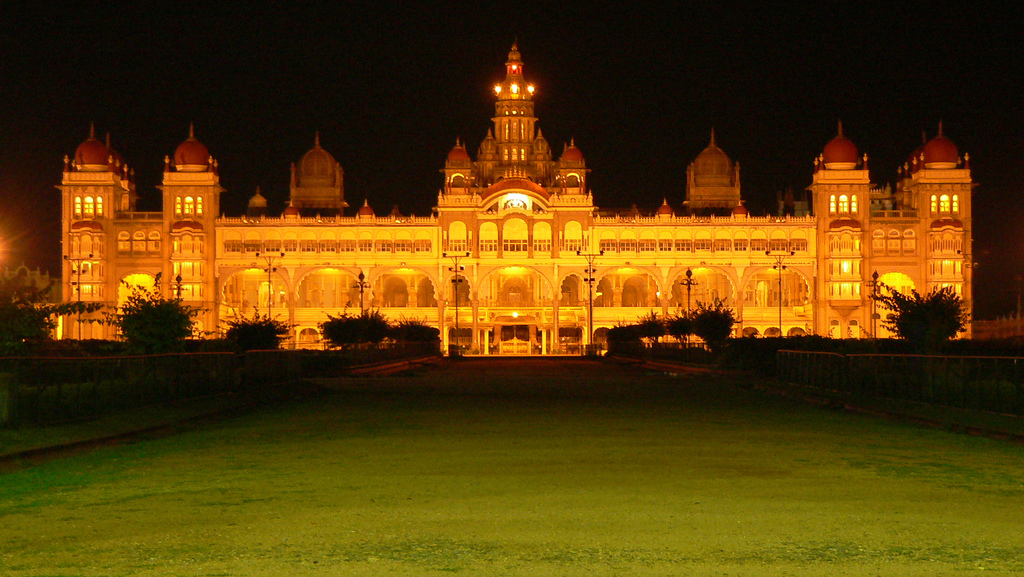
Mysore Palace

Mysore is a city in the state of Karnataka, India. It is known as the cultural capital of Karnataka. Mysore was the capital of the Wodeyar kings who ruled over the Mysore Kingdom for many centuries. Wodeyars were great patrons of art and music and have contributed significantly to make Mysore a cultural centre. Mysore is well known for its palaces, museums and art galleries and the festivities that take place here during the period of Dasara attract a worldwide audience. Mysore has also lent its name to popular dishes like Mysore Masala Dosa and Mysore Pak. Mysore is also the origin of the popular silk sari known as Mysore silk sari and has also given rise to a popular form of painting known as Mysore painting.

== Festivals ==
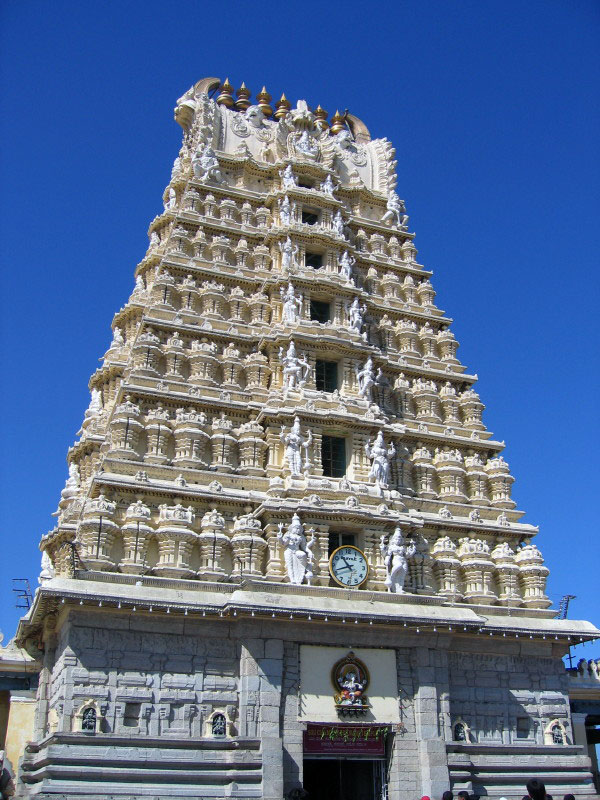
Chamundi Temple atop Chamundi Hill at Mysore

=== Dasara ===
Dasara is the Nadahabba (state-festival) of the state of Karnataka. It is also known as Navaratri (Nava-ratri = nine-nights) and is a 10-day festival with the last day being Vijayadashami, the most auspicious day of Dasara. Dasara usually falls in the month of September or October. According to a legend, Vijayadashami denotes the victory of truth over evil and was the day when the Hindu Goddess Chamundeshwari killed the demon Mahishasura. Mahishasura is the demon from whose name Mysore has been derived.

The Dasara festivities are attested at least since Wodeyar King, Raja Wodeyar I (1578–1617 CE) in 1610. The Mysore Palace is lit up on all the 10 days of Dasara. The festivities begin with the Wodeyar royal couple performing a special puja to Goddess Chamundeshwari in the Chamundi Temple located on the top of Chamundi Hill at Mysore. This would be followed by a special durbar (royal assembly).Kings wore the traditional Mysore Peta as headgear during the Durbar (court of Indian or princely state's kings) time or in a ceremonial procession during the Dasara celebrations. It was during the reign of Krishnaraja Wodeyar III in 1805, when the king started the tradition of having a special durbar in the Mysore Palace during Dasara; which was attended by members of the royal family, special invitees, officials and the masses. The King and men attending King's court wore the conventional attire called the durbar dress which comprised a black long coat with white trousers and a compulsory Mysore Peta. This tradition has been continued even now with the current scion of the Wodeyar family, Yaduveer Krishnadatta Chamaraja Wodeyar holding a private durbar during Dasara. The ninth day of Dasara known as Mahanavami is also an auspicious day on which the royal sword is worshipped and is taken on a procession involving elephants, camels and horses.

On Vijayadashami, the traditional Dasara procession (locally known as Jumboo Savari) is held on the streets of Mysore city. The main attraction of this procession is the idol of the Goddess Chamundeshwari which is placed on a golden mantapa on the top of a decorated elephant. This idol is worshipped by the royal couple and other invitees before it is taken around in the procession. Colourful tableaux, dance groups, music bands, decorated elephants, horses and camels form a part of the procession which starts from the Mysore Palace and culminates at a place called Bannimantap where the banni tree (Prosopis spicigera) is worshipped. According to a legend of the Mahabharata, banni tree was used by the Pandavas to hide their arms during their one-year period of Agnatavasa (living life incognito). Before undertaking any warfare, the kings traditionally worshipped this tree to help them emerge victorious in the war. The Dasara festivities would culminate on the night of Vijayadashami with an event held in the grounds at Bannimantap called as Panjina Kavayatthu (torch-light parade).

Another major attraction during Dasara is the Dasara exhibition which is held in the exhibition grounds opposite to the Mysore Palace. This exhibition starts during Dasara and goes on till December. Various stalls which sell items like clothes, plastic items, kitchenware, cosmetics and eatables are set up and they attract a significant number of people. A play area containing attractions like ferris-wheel is also present to provide entertainment to the people. Various Governmental agencies setup stalls to signify the achievements and projects that they have undertaken.

On all the 10 days of Dasara, various music and dance concerts are held in auditoriums around Mysore city. Musicians and dance groups from all over India are invited to perform on this occasion. Another attraction during Dasara is the Kusti Spardhe (wrestling-bout) which attracts wrestlers from all around India.

== Palaces ==
Wodeyar kings of Mysore have built quite a few palaces in Mysore and this has earned the city the sobriquet of City of Palaces. Following are the palaces present here:

=== Ambavilas Palace ===
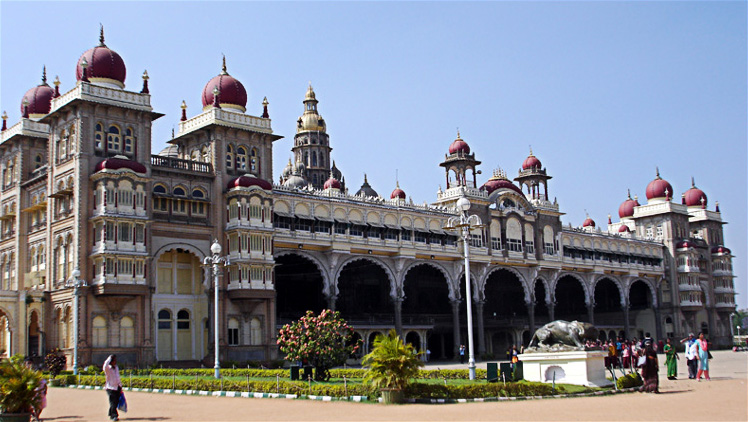
The Ambavilas Palace or Mysore Palace

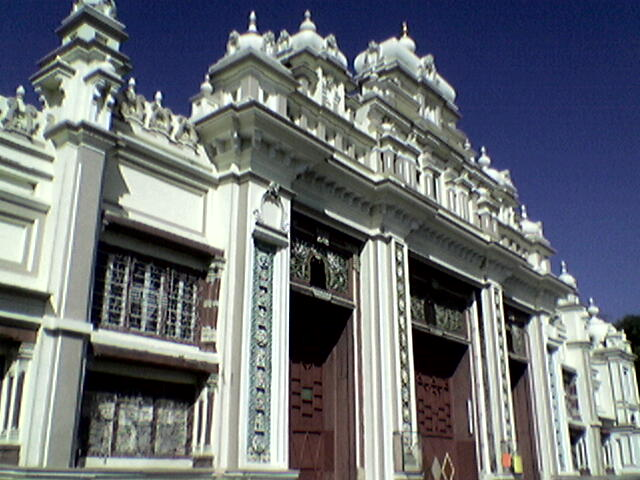
The Jaganmohana Palace in Mysore

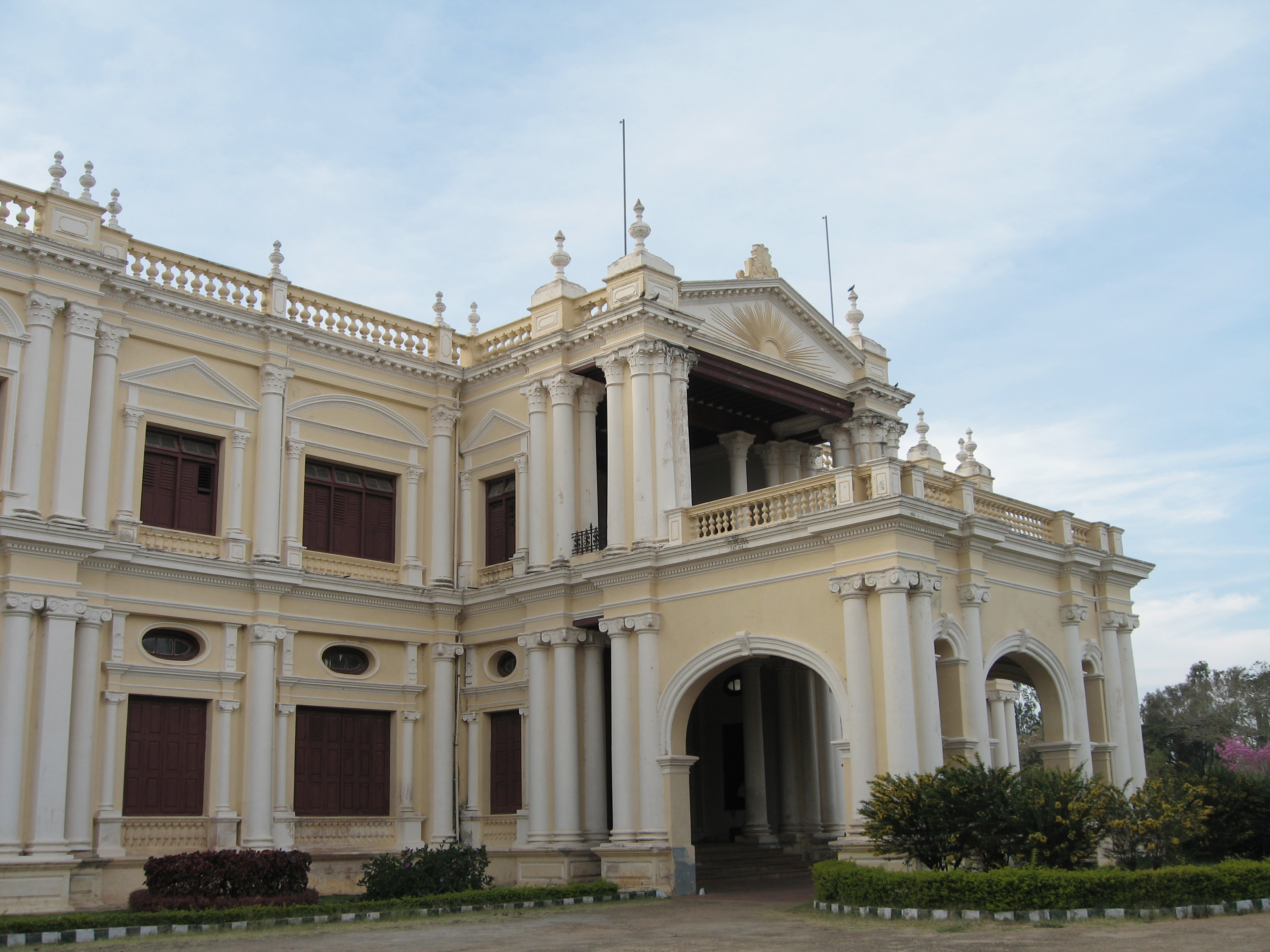
The Jayalakshmi Vilas Mansion in Mysore

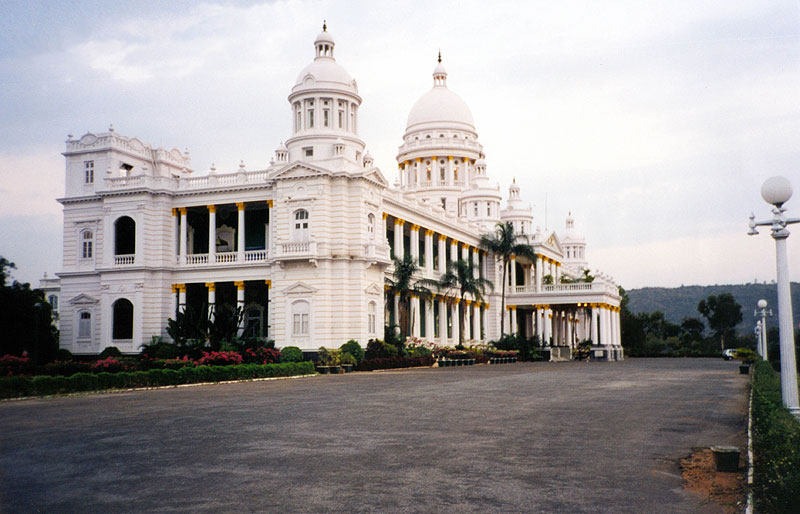
The Lalitha Mahal in Mysore

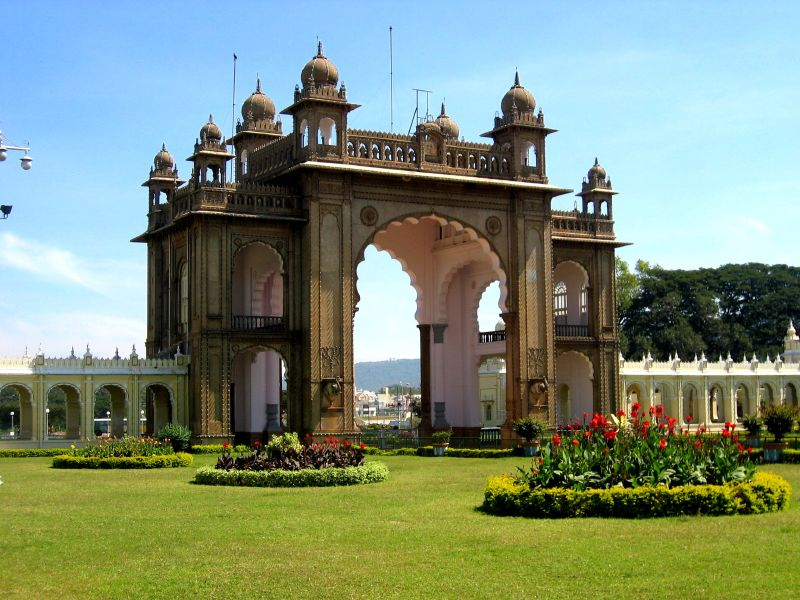
The entrance gate of Mysore Palace

This is the main palace of Mysore and also termed as Mysore Palace. This palace was built in 1912 at a cost of Rs. 4,150,000 in the Indo-Sarcenic style. The earlier wooden palace that existed at this location got burnt in a fire during the wedding of Jayalakshammanni, the eldest daughter of Chamaraja Wodeyar, in February 1897. The architect of this palace was Mr. Henry Irwin and the consulting engineer was Mr E W Fritchley. The palace is a three storied structure with the tallest tower with a gilded dome rising to 145 feet above ground. In the first floor is the grand Durbar hall, where the kings used to hold their assembly. Some of the other important halls within the palace are Kalyana Mantap (the wedding hall), Gombe Thotti (hall of dolls) and Amba Vilasa (private hall). Lifelike paintings, murals, arms, trophies, stained glass windows and decorated domes enhance the architectural splendour of this palace. This is the center of all festivities during the Dasara.

=== Jaganmohan Palace ===
Jaganmohan Palace was built in 1861 by Krishnaraja Wodeyar III in a predominantly Hindu style to serve as an alternate palace for the royal family. This palace housed the royal family when the older Mysore Palace was burnt down by a fire. The palace has three floors and has stained glass shutters and ventilators. It has housed the Sri Jayachamarajendra Art Gallery since the year 1915. The collections exhibited here include paintings from the famed Travancore ruler, Raja Ravi Varma, the Russian painter Svetoslav Roerich and many paintings of the Mysore painting style. The Durbar Hall here was the place where the early convocations of the Mysore University were held. The hall also serves as an auditorium for staging cultural programmes.

=== Jayalakshmi Vilas Mansion ===
This palace was built in 1905 for Jayalakshmi Devi, eldest daughter of Chamaraja Wodeyar. This mansion has three wings and contains a series of twin Corinthian and Ionic columns, regal pediments and oval ventilators. The mansion was originally built with a cost of Rs. 700,000. This mansion was acquired by the Mysore University to house its post-graduate campus. It was renovated in 2002 from funding provided by Infosys foundation. The main hall in this mansion is the Kalyana Mantapa which has an eight-petal shaped dome with stained glass windows with a gold-plated Kalasha(tower) at the top. A new gallery called as Writer's Gallery has been created in the Kalyana Mantapa hall that will exhibit personal items, photographs, awards and writings of renowned writers of Kannada. A special illumination system has also been added to this heritage structure. This mansion is said to be the first university museum complex in the country.

=== Lalitha Mahal ===
The architect of this palace was Mr E W Fritchley. The palace was built by Krishnaraja Wodeyar IV in 1921 for the exclusive stay of the Viceroy of India. The palace is pure white in colour and is built in the style of Italian palazzo with twin Ionic columns and domes. It also has a sprawling terrace and landscaped gardens. This palace has now been converted into a five-star hotel belonging to the Ashok Group of Hotels. The interior of this palace contains venation marble floors, rosewood furniture and a stately balustrade staircase. The central hall in the palace contains life size portraits of the royalty, lithographs, motifs, a Belgian glass dome and carved wood shutters. An ancient elevator, still in working condition, is also present.

=== Rajendra Vilas ===
This is a palace atop the Chamundi Hill. This was conceived in the 1920s and completed in 1938–1939. This was built as a summer palace for the Wodeyar kings. This palace is currently owned by the current scion of the royal family, Yaduveer Krishnadatta Chamaraja Wadiyar. There are plans to convert this into a Heritage hotel.

=== Cheluvamba Mansion ===
This mansion was built by Krishnaraja Wodeyar IV for his third daughter, Cheluvajammanni. It now houses the CFTRI (Central Food and Technological Research Institute).

== Painting ==
=== Mysore painting ===
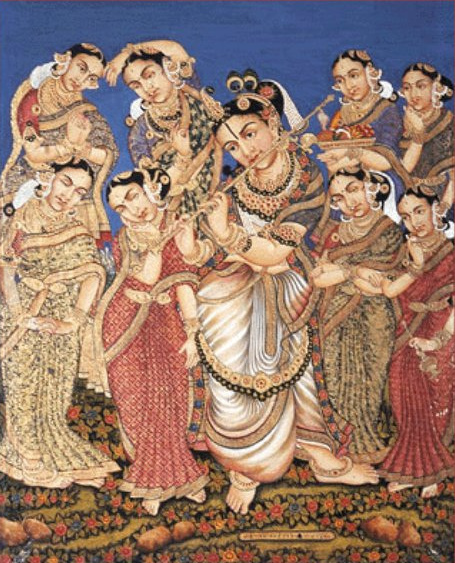
Mysore Painting depicting Krishna with his eight principal wives.

The traditional form of painting called as Mysore painting is an offshoot of the Vijayanagar school of Painting. With the fall of the Vijayanagar empire, the artists who were involved in the Vijayanagar Paintings were rendered jobless. The Wodeyar king, Raja Wodeyar (1578–1617 CE) rehabilitated these artists in Srirangapatna and under his patronage, a new form of painting called as Mysore painting evolved. These artists employed by the king made use of locally available materials to do the paintings. Squirrel hair was used as a brush by tying the hair with a silken thread and inserting them into the narrow end of a quill. A cloth spread over a wooden plank formed the painting board. Properly burnt tamarind sticks were used as a sketching charcoal. The main attraction of these paintings was the gesso work in which gold foils were pasted on appropriate regions on the painting. Gesso was used for depicting intricate designs of clothes, jewellery and architectural details. Stories from the Ramayana, Mahabharata, Bhagavata Purana and Jain epics formed the basis of these paintings. Mummadi Krishnaraja Wodeyar (Krishnaraja Wodeyar III) was instrumental in the growth of the Mysore painting form and is said to have commissioned more than 1000 portraits during his reign. Many of these paintings can still be seen on the walls of the Jaganmohan Palace at Mysore.

=== Ganjifa Art ===
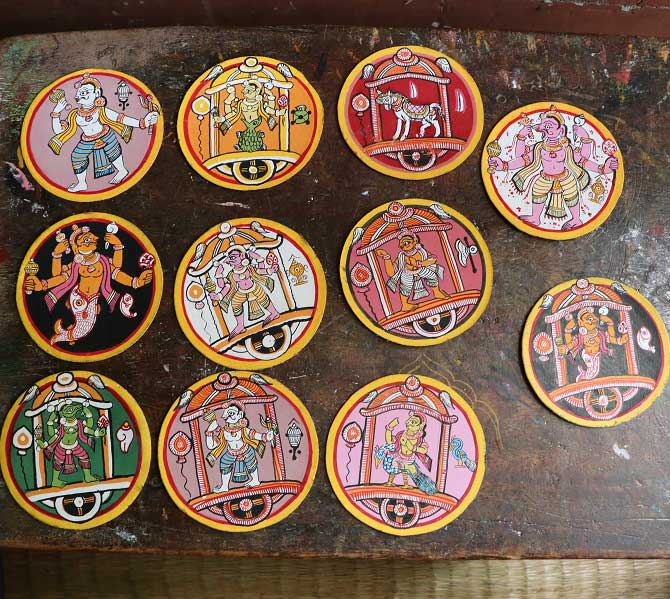
Dashavatar Ganjapa

Ganjifa or Ganjeefa was a popular card game in ancient India. Played extensively in the Mughal period, Ganjifa is now known more for the art work on the cards than the game itself. Cards made for royalty were inlaid with precious stones and were also made of ivory, mother-of-pearl and wafers of lac. In Mysore, this game was known as "Chadd" (God's play). One of the finest exponents of Ganjifa Art, Ganjifa Raghupathi Bhatta is a resident of Mysore and has set up an International Ganjifa Research Centre at Mysore. The cards are generally circular and sometimes rectangular in shape with lacquered backs with exquisite paintings on them.

== Carpentry ==
=== Rosewood Inlay work ===
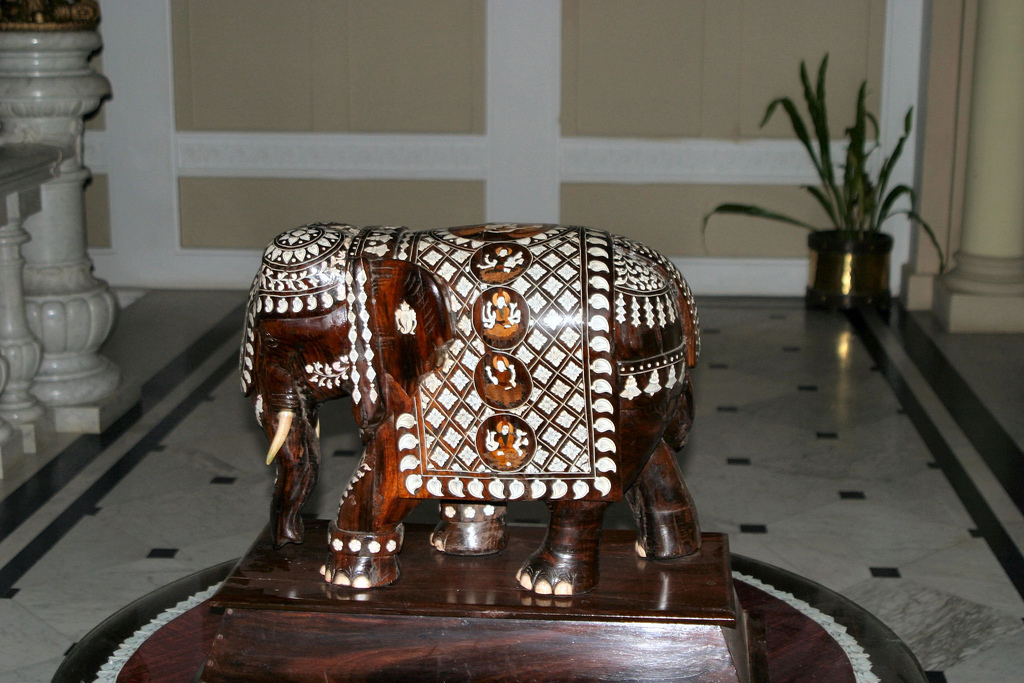
An elephant created using wood-inlay work.

British writers mention the existence of thousands of workers in Mysore involved in inlaying etched ivory motifs into rosewood to create intricate wood work. Even now an estimated 4000 people in Mysore are involved in rosewood inlay work though other media like plastic have replaced ivory. This intricate work involves many stages. The first step is to design and draw the images and patterns on the rosewood. Then the rosewood is cut into proper shape by carpentry. The motifs that have to be inlaid are then carefully handcut to shape. The areas where the motifs have to be inlaid on the rosewood, are carefully scooped out. Next the motifs are inlaid and fixed. The wood is then smoothened using sandpaper and polished to give a bright look.

== Fashion ==
=== Mysore silk saree ===
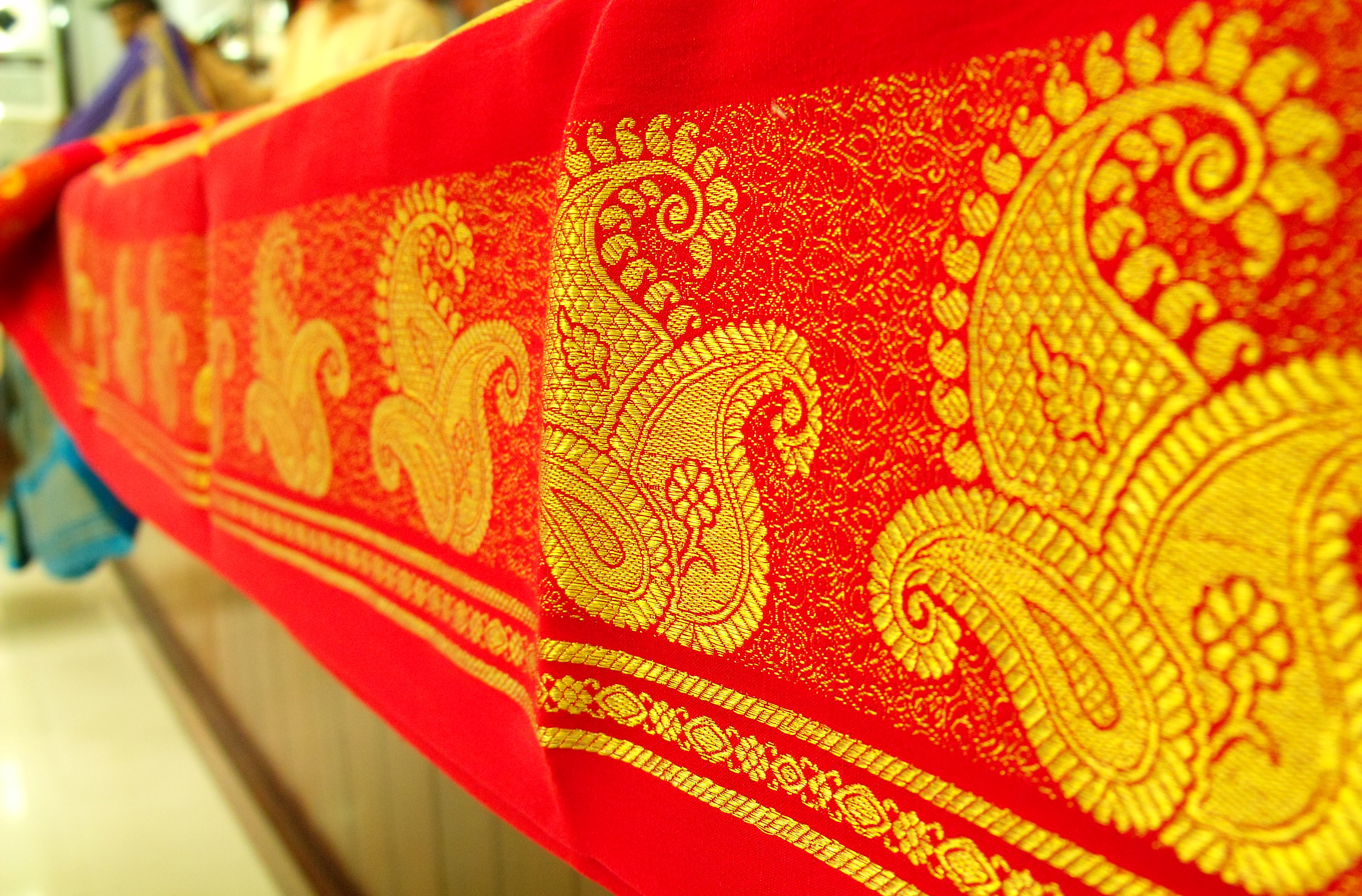
Mysore silk saree with golden zari

Mysore is the home of the famous Indian feminine wear, the Mysore silk saree. Mysore Silk is a trademark for the silk sarees produced by KSIC (Karnataka Silk Industries Corporation). The distinguishing feature of this saree is the usage of pure silk and 100% pure gold zari (a golden coloured thread containing 65% of silver and 0.65% of gold). These sarees are manufactured in a silk factory located in Mysore city. This factory was started in 1912 by the Maharaja of Mysore by importing 32 looms from Switzerland. In 1980, this factory was transferred to KSIC and now has around 159 looms. Every saree produced here comes with an embroidered code number and a hologram to prevent misuse. Mysore silk sarees are also undergoing an innovating change with the use of kasuti embroidery, thickly woven pallus (the part of the saree worn over the shoulder), bandhini techniques and new colours like lilac, coffee-brown and elephant-grey.

== Cuisine ==
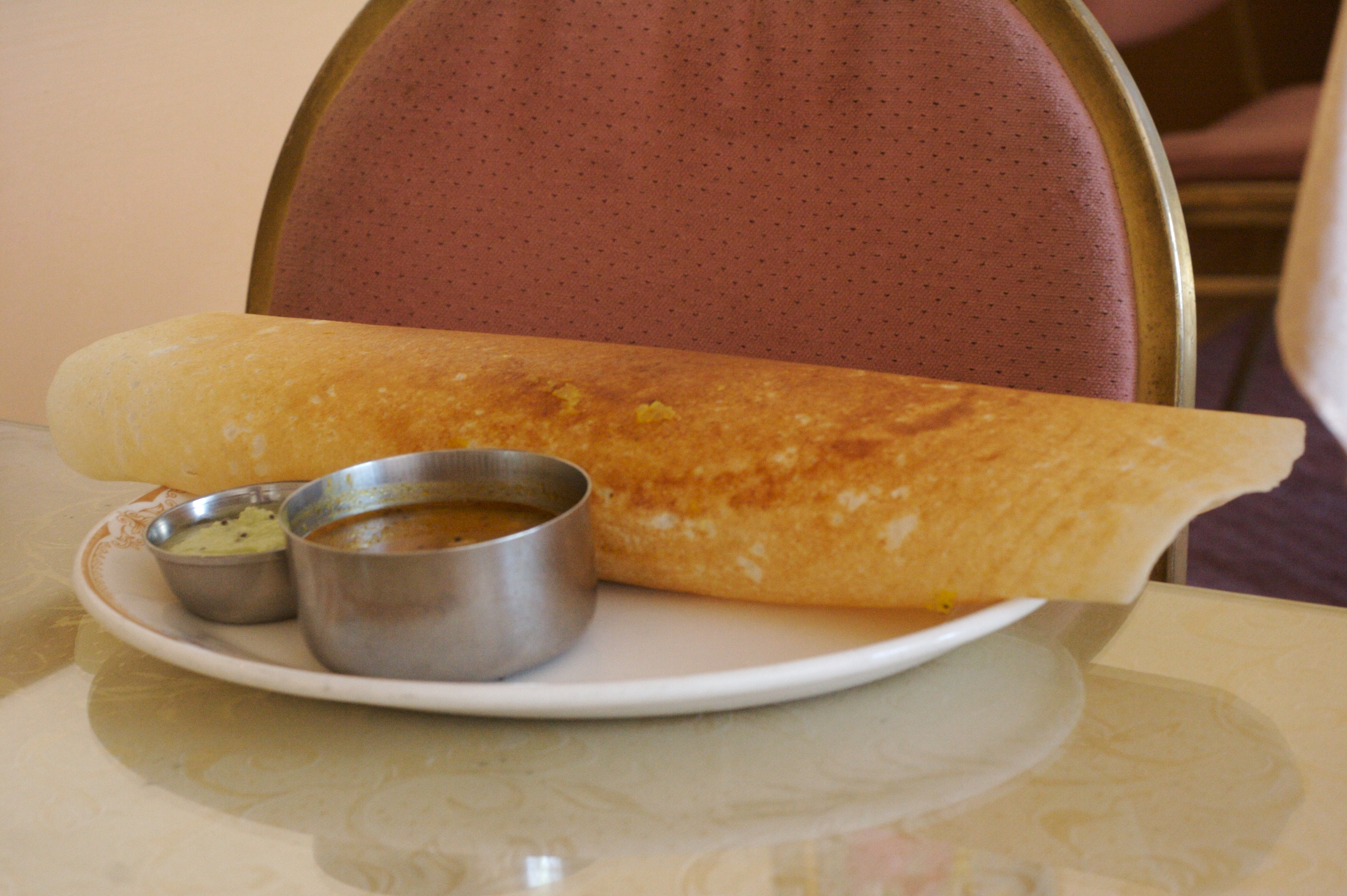
Masala Dosa served with sambar and chutney, a common breakfast in Mysore

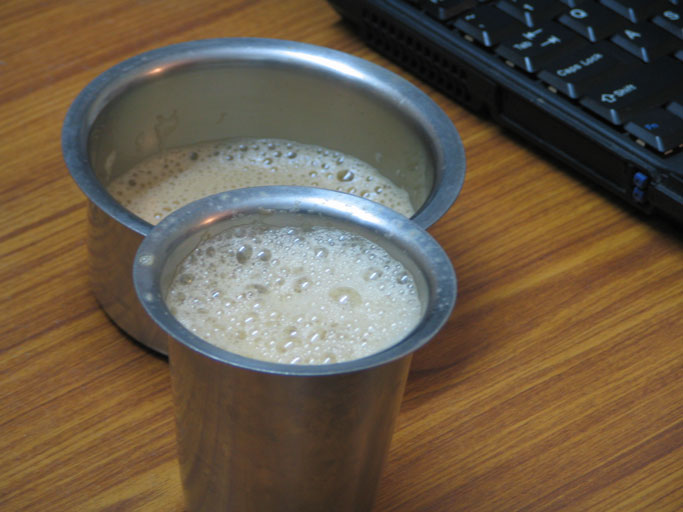
Indian filter coffee, the preferred beverage in the homes in Mysore

The cuisine of Mysore resembles to a large extent the Udupi cuisine. Rice is the staple food item used in cooking and various spices are also used. A breakfast mostly includes dishes made of rice of which idli and dosa are prevalent. Vada is another popular breakfast item mostly prepared only in hotels. Other popular breakfast dishes include shavige bath (spicy dish made of vermicelli), rava idli, oggarane avalakki (seasoned beaten rice), Pongal and Poori. A lunch or dinner spread generally includes steamed rice, chutney, sambar, pickle, curry, gojju (a sweet curry), rasam, papad and curds. Some of the rice based dishes that form a part of the lunch are Bisi bele bath (a spicy rice preparation with vegetables), vangi baath (rice mixed with brinjal curry), chitranna (rice mixed with seasoning, turmeric and lemon juice or raw mango scrapes) and Puliyogare. Chapati is another lunch item preferred nowadays. In formal occasions like marriage, the food is served on a plantain leaf and would include additional items like sweets and Kosambari apart from the ones mentioned above. Some of the popular sweet dishes are rave unde (sweet balls made of semolina and coconut scrapes), ladoo, payasam, Mysore Pak and jalebi. It is customary to eat adike (arecanut) with betel leaf after the lunch/dinner. Coffee (Indian filter coffee) is the preferred beverage in homes. Some of the snacks that are prevalent here are chakkuli, khara mandakki (spicy puffed rice), churmuri and kodubale (a doughnut shaped spicy snack made of fried semolina). In the last few years, chaat, pizzas and items belonging to Indian Chinese cuisine have become popular mostly with the younger generation. Mysore has also lent its name to the sweet-dish Mysore Pak and the Mysore Masala Dosa.

== Institutions ==
=== CAVA ===
Chamarajendra Academy of Visual Arts (CAVA) is an arts academy located in Mysore and affiliated to the University of Mysore. It offers courses in drawing, painting, sculpture, graphics, applied arts, photography, photojournalism and art history. It awards the Bachelor of Fine Arts degree and also has a master's program leading into the Master of Fine Arts. It was started in 1906 as Chamarajendra Technical Institute by the then King of Mysore, Nalvadi Krishnaraja Wodeyar. King George V laid the foundation to this institute which was started in dedication to the king, Chamarajendra Wodeyar. Chamarajendra Technical Institute was renamed as CAVA in 1981 by the Government of Karnataka and on the suggestions of the renowned Russian painter, Svetoslav Roerich, CAVA was modelled on the lines of the famous J.J. School of Arts in Mumbai.

=== Rangayana ===
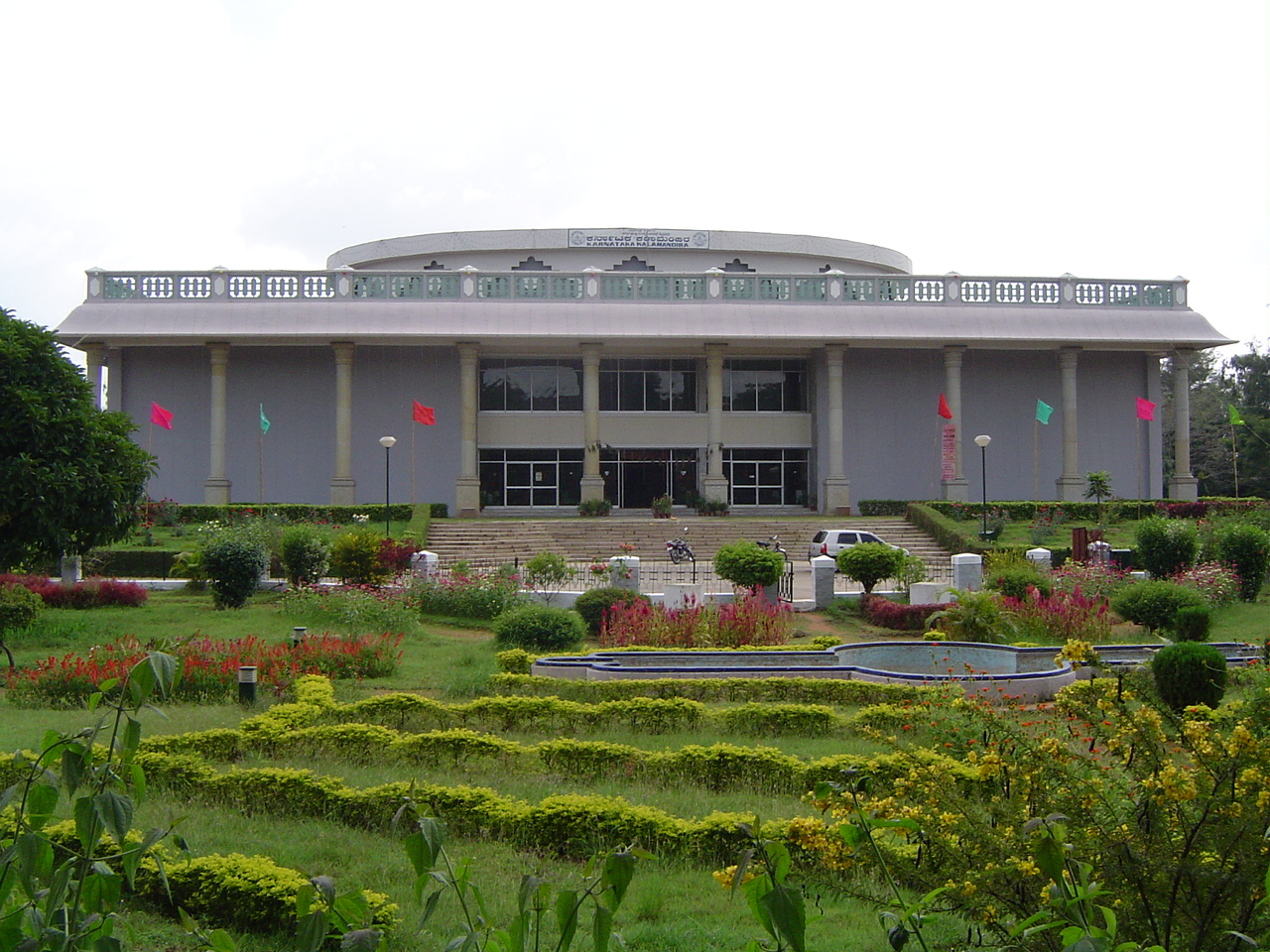
Kalamandira, location of Rangayana theatre institute

Rangayana is a theatre institution located in the campus of Kalamandira auditorium in Mysore. It was started in 1989 as an autonomous cultural organisation by the Government of Karnataka. It has two divisions working under it, Bharatiya Ranga Shikshana Kendra which is a theatre training institute and Sriranga Ranga Mahiti and Samshodana Kendra which is a documentation and research centre. Having an ensemble of fifteen actors and actresses, Rangayana Repertory performs on week ends (Saturday & Sunday) at Bhoomigita Theater at Mysore. It also offers a 1-year diploma course for theatre enthusiasts.

=== Dhvanyaloka ===
Dhvanyaloka is an institution dedicated to the advanced study and research in English literature. It was started in 1979 by Prof. C. D. Narasimhaiah (popularly known as CDN). This institution publishes a journal called as Literary Criterion which contains articles related to literature. Some of the other books published by this institution includes Kipling's India, Bhakti in Indian literature, Indian poetics in application, Western writers on India, the Vitality of West Indian Writing, Glimpses of New Zealand Literature, T. S. Eliot and the Indian Literary Scene and Indian literature in English.

=== Akashavani (All India Radio) ===
Mysore hosts one of the oldest broadcasting stations of All India Radio. The term Akashavani was actually coined here by Prof. M. V. Gopalaswami in 1936. It remains quite popular to this day and organizes various intellectual, educative and entertainment programs aiming to promote the local culture and traditions.

== Museums ==
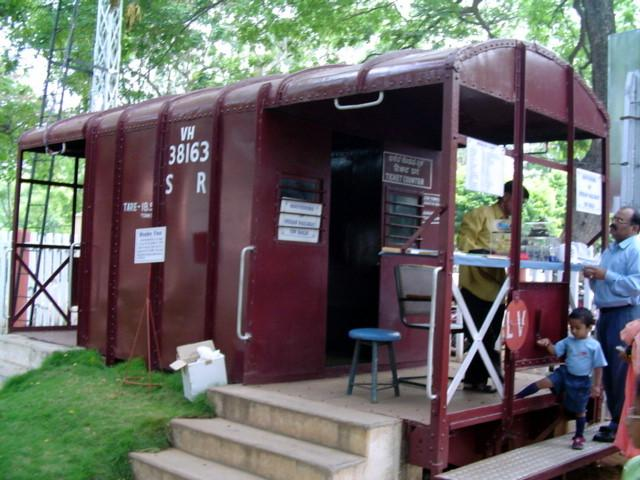
Rail Museum at Mysore

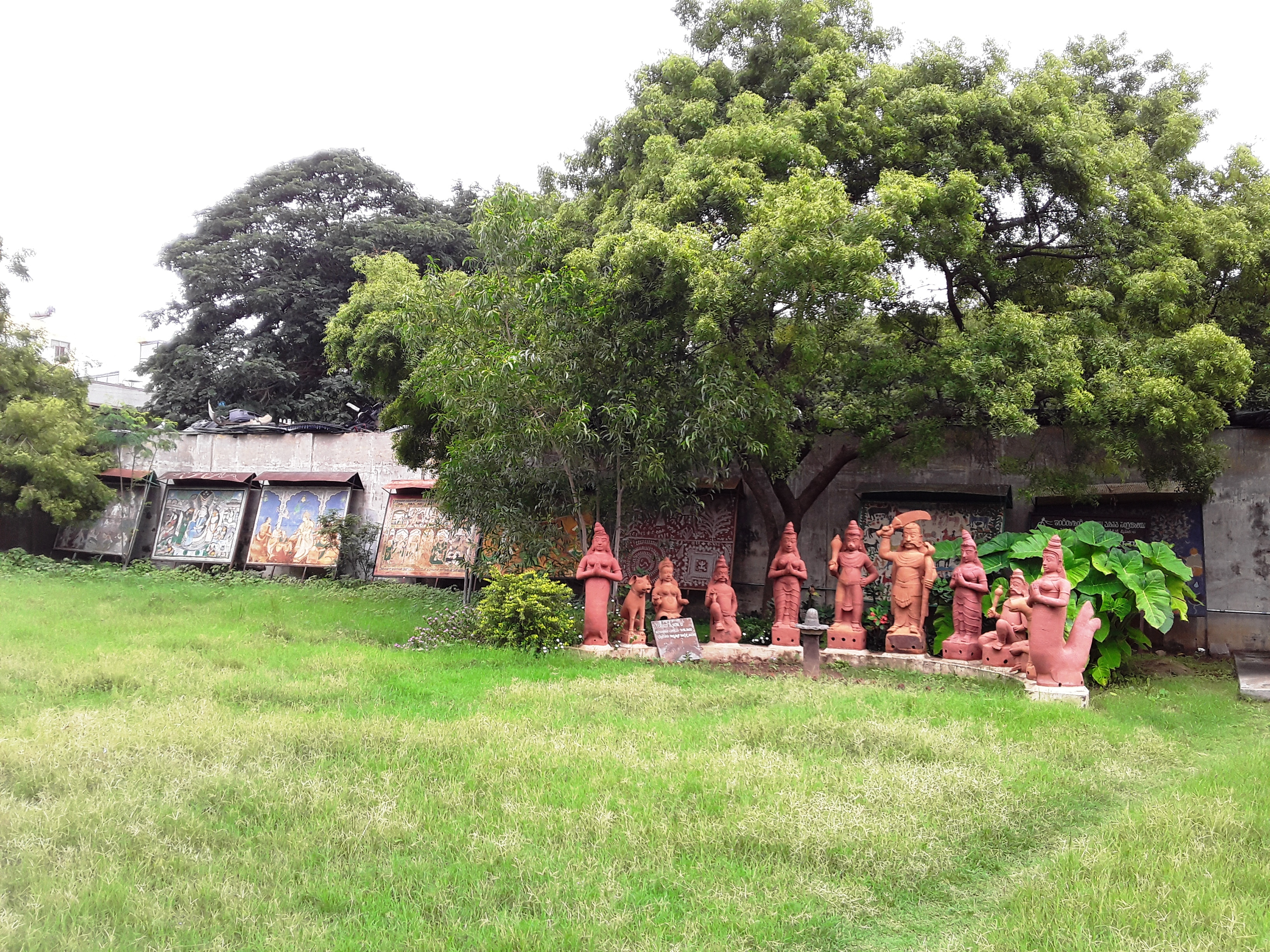
Willington Museum, Suburban Bus Station area

The following museums exist in Mysore:

- Regional Museum of Natural History: This museum is located on the banks of the Karanji lake in Mysore and has exhibits related to biological diversity, ecology and geology of Southern India.
- Folk Lore Museum: This museum is located in the University of Mysore campus and exhibits over 6500 folk art and crafts from all over the state of Karnataka.
- Rail Museum: This museum is located near the Mysore Railway station and is the second one of its kind established in India after the one at Delhi. This museum exhibits ancient locomotives and carriages some of which are still in working condition. Photographs and books related to railway are also present.
- Oriental Research Institute, formerly known as the Oriental Library, established in 1891 contains over 33000 palm leaf manuscripts

== Personalities ==
=== Drama ===
- Hirannaiah: Mysore has given to the Kannada theatre world; one of its stalwarts in the form of Senior Hirannaiah, the father of the well known dramatist and comedian, Master Hirannaiah. Hirannaiah was born in Mysore in 1905. He has produced some of the famous Kannada dramas like Devadasi, Sadaarame and Yechamma Nayaka. His drama Sadaarame is said to have run at full house in the Town Hall at Mysore for a continuous 48 days. Also his drama Devadasi set a record run of being played for a continuous five months. He was also the founder member of the drama troupe called Mithra Mandali. For his contribution to the field of drama, he received the title of Cultural Comedian from the Mysore king. He born on 21 March 1953. One of his famous quotes says, Drama is the best type of art and the worst type of profession.
- B. V. Karanth: B. V. Karanth is an alumnus of the National School of Drama who also later became its director. He has directed many Kannada plays and movies. His movie Chomana Dudi (Choma's drum) has won the National Award for the Best Film. His contribution has been recognised by the Government of India who awarded him the Padma Shri award. His association with Mysore was from the year 1989–1995 when he was the director of Rangayana, the famous theatre institution at Mysore.

=== Literature ===
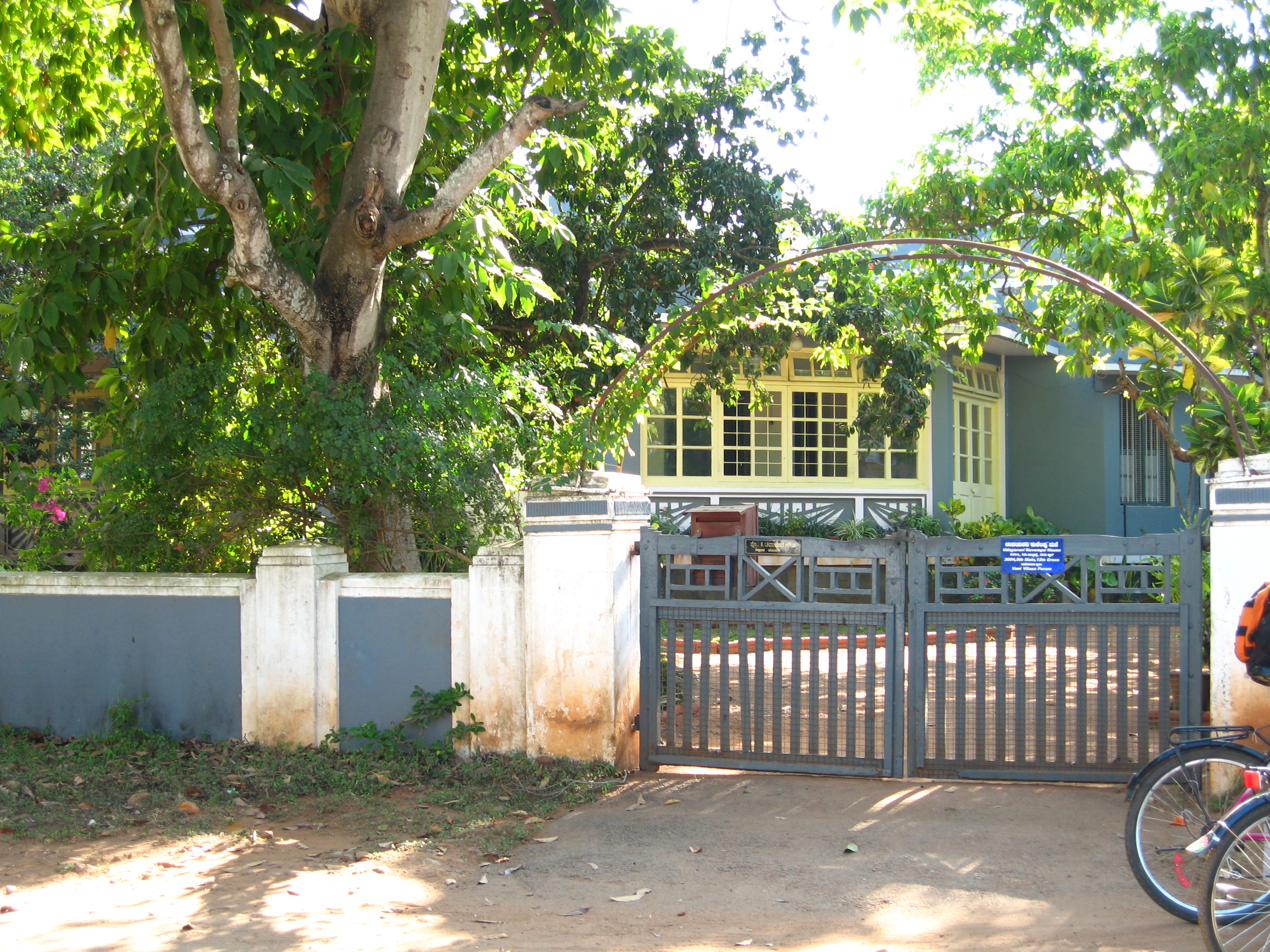
Kuvempu's house in Mysore

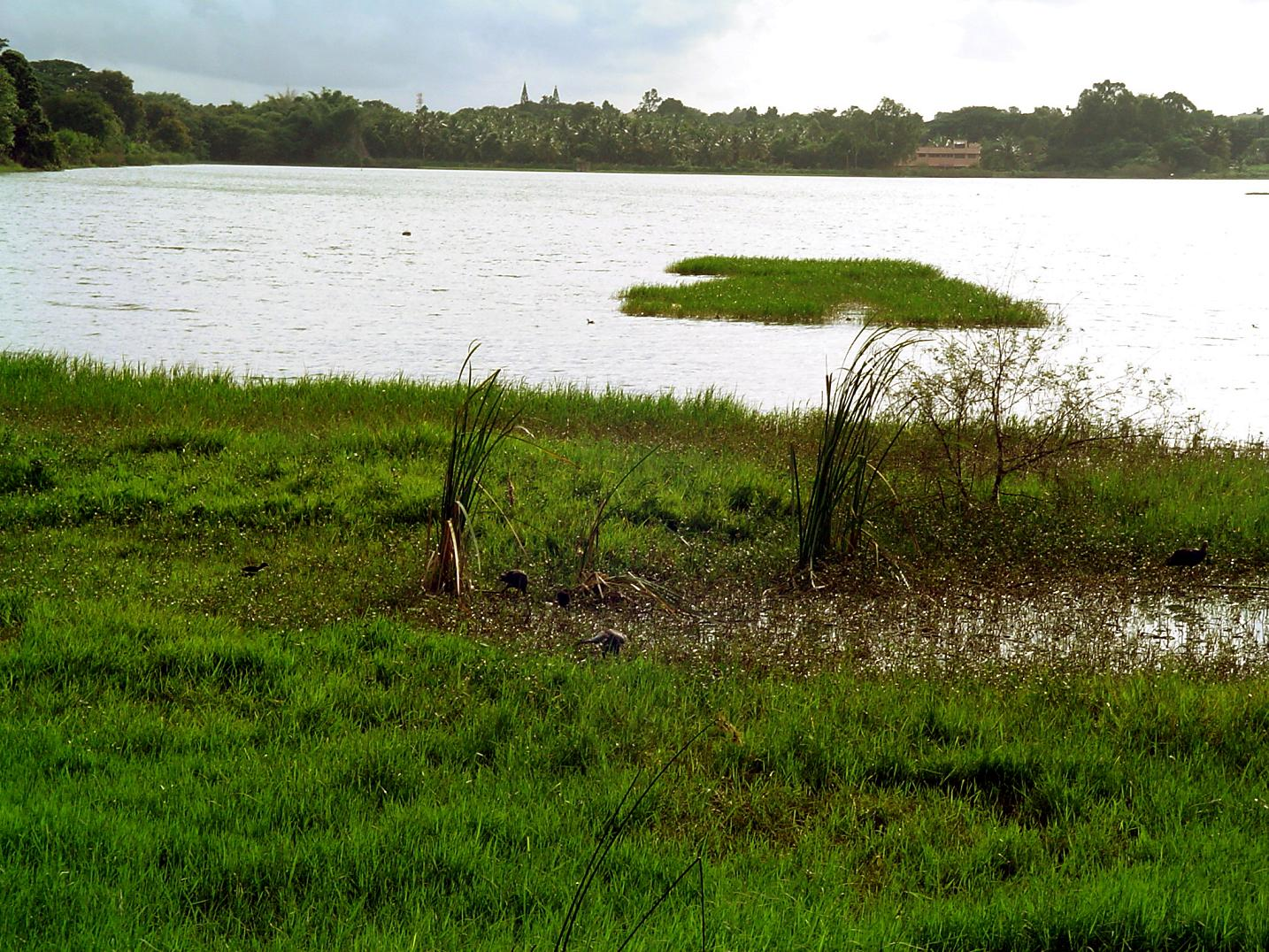
Mysore's Kukkarahally Lake, source of inspiration for writers like Kuvempu

- Kuvempu: Kuvempu is a Kannada writer, poet of 20th century widely regarded as the greatest writer of Kannada language. He is one of the recipients of the Jnanpith award and has a long association with Mysore. He came to Mysore for his higher education and joined Maharaja College of Mysore where he graduated in 1929 majoring in Kannada. After his graduation, he continued as a lecturer of Kannada in Maharaja's college. After a brief stint in Bangalore, he rejoined Maharaja's college as a Kannada professor in 1946 and later went on to become its principal in 1955. In 1956, he was elected as the Vice-Chancellor of Mysore University where he served till retirement in 1960. Kuvempu is the one who christened the Mysore University campus as Manasagangotri. It is said that Kuvempu used to frequently walk on the periphery of the Kukkarahally Lake in Mysore; which was a source of inspiration for him. Kuvempu died in Mysore in 1994.
- R.K. Narayan: R.K. Narayan is one of the best known English novelist from India. Most of his writings are based on a fictional Indian town called Malgudi. Narayan spent most of his life in Mysore where his father was the headmaster of Maharaja's High School. He has a Bachelor of Arts degree from University of Mysore. His first published novel was Swami and Friends. Though Narayan faced hurdles while publishing this novel, he was able to succeed in publishing it with the help of Graham Greene. Some of his other famous novels are The Guide, The Man-Eater of Malgudi, The English Teacher and The World of Nagaraj. The Guide was made into a very famous Hindi film and this also earned him the National Award from Sahitya Akademi. Most of his short stories related to Malgudi have been made a part of a tele serial called as Malgudi Days which was directed by Shankar Nag. The Government of India has awarded him the Padma Vibhushan for his contribution to the English Literature. Some of the characters in his novels, like Raju (in The Guide), Sampath (in Mr. Sampath - The Printer of Malgudi) and Margayya (in The Financial Expert) are said to be real life Mysoreans. Naryan's younger brother R. K. Laxman is a well known cartoonist.
- R. K. Laxman: R. K. Laxman is the younger brother of R. K. Narayan and is a well known cartoonist. He was born in Mysore in 1924. His most famous cartoon creation is that of The Common Man. He graduated from the University of Mysore. He drew illustrations for his brother Narayan's stories in The Hindu. Later, he joined The Times of India; an association that continued for over fifty years. Laxman is best known for his daily one panel comic "pocket cartoon" series published daily in The Times of India called You Said It; which features The Common Man; and chronicles the state of Indian life. The Government of India has awarded him the Padma Vibhushan award.
- S. L. Bhyrappa: Being one of the most celebrated authors of India, S. L. Bhyrappa is known for his thought provoking novels that are widely discussed, debated in the literary circles. His writing on contemporary societal issues and challenges is unique in terms of its structure and characterization, making his novels influential and critically acclaimed. He has authored more than 25 novels spanning over 6 decades of writing, and many of them haven been successfully made into movies and television series, and have been translated into multiple languages. He has been honored with prestigious awards including Saraswathi Samman and Padma Shri.
- Gopalakrishna Adiga: Gopalakrishna Adiga was one of the fathers of Modern Kannada poetry. He is known as the pioneer of the Kannada New style form of poetry and was part of a trinity of great modern Kannada poets along with Kuvempu and Shivaram Karanth. He did his higher education in Mysore where he earned his master's degree in English literature from Mysore University and was also a recipient of the BMS Gold Medal for Poetry awarded by that University. In the 1950s and 1960s, Adiga was a teacher of English literature in Mysore.
- U R Ananthamurthy: Ananthamurthy is a leading contemporary writer, critic and philosopher in Kannada language. He is a recipient of the Jnanpith award. He has a Master of Arts degree from the Mysore University and he also started his career as a professor and instructor of English in this university. Ananthamurthy made Mysore his home for a number of years before moving to Bangalore.
- Triveni: Anasuya Shankar, who was known by her pen name as Triveni was one of the most prominent women writers whose novels reflected the emotions of women in the contemporary era. She was awarded the Karnataka Sahitya Academy Award for her contribution to Kannada literature, which includes 20 novels and 3 short story collections. Her novels such as Sharapanjara were adapted into successful movies by Puttanna Kanagal.
- Vani: Triveni's cousin Vani was also a notable writer whose novels on social issues such as Shubhamangala, Eradu Kanasu and Hosabelaku were adapted into acclaimed movies.

Apart from the above-mentioned personalities, other eminent litterateurs who were educated and/or taught in Mysore (mostly at Mysore University) at some point of their career include statesman, philosopher and former president of India Dr. Sarvepalli Radhakrishnan, Sanskrit scholar M. Hiriyanna, scholar and librarian R. Shamasastry, historian S. Srikanta Sastri, author B. M. Srikantaiah, poet T. N. Srikantaiah, author and professor M. V. Seetharamiah, writer A. R. Krishnashastry, author and educator T.S. Venkannaiah, linguist and grammarian D. L. Narasimhachar, music composer Rallapalli Ananta Krishna Sharma, lexicographer G. Venkatasubbiah, poet G. P. Rajarathnam, poet K. S. Narasimhaswamy, playwright and poet P. T. Narasimhachar, writer V Sitaramiah, literary critic C. D. Narasimhaiah, author Aryamba Pattabhi, writer G. S. Shivarudrappa, author Poornachandra Tejaswi, journalist P. Lankesh, writer Chaduranga, archaeologist S.R. Rao, and so on. Thanks to Wodeyars and Diwans, Mysore in 19th and 20th century flourished as one of the main centers of learning and education in India. It still continues that legacy through its universities and research institutes. Many noted science writers such as Prof. G.T. Narayana Rao, Prof. J.R. Lakshmana Rao, etc. whose inspiring books and articles on astronomy, physics, chemistry and biographies of world renowned scientists also had successful career at the University of Mysore.

=== Journalism ===
Mysore is home to the only Sanskrit daily newspaper of India named Sudharma. It was established by the eminent Sanskrit scholar Kalale Nadadur Varadaraja Iyengar in 1970. The newspaper has received many accolades since then for their efforts to promote the ancient language. It is currently managed by Varadaraja Iyengar's son Sri K.V.Sampathkumar and his wife Smt. Jayalakshmi KS. The e-paper is also available on their website.

== Music ==
Carnatic music flourished under the patronage of the Wodeyar dynasty for many centuries in Mysore. Great composers of the erstwhile era including Mysore Sadashiva Rao, Mysore Vasudevacharya, Muthiah Bhagavathar, etc. were court musicians during the era of Krishnaraja Wodeyar IV and Jayachamarajendra Wodeyar. Maharaja Jayachamarajendra Wodeyar was an excellent composer himself, and has contributed immensely to Carnatic music through his immortal compositions.

Mysore is renowned for its unique style of playing the Veena, known as Mysore Bani. Veene Sheshanna, an eminent Vainika and a disciple of Mysore Sadashiva Rao was also a court musician during the early 20th century. Other great Vainikas of his era include his student Veena Venkatagiriyappa and Veene Shamanna who enriched the instrumental music tradition in the Mysore kingdom.

The Mysore brothers, Dr. Mysore Manjunath and Mysore Nagaraj, are world-renowned violin maestros from the city of Mysore; sons of veteran musician Sangita Vidya Nidhi Vidwan Mahadevappa, the brothers' outstanding musicianship and astounding virtuosity made them some of the best violin players in the contemporary music world. They represent the genre of Carnatic music and have collaborated with numerous world-class musicians in countless countries at major music festivals and conferences.

Mysore also boasts of one of the finest violin teachers of India H. K. Narasimhamurthy. He has trained a long line of students, who have gone onto make a mark in the world of Indian music. A highly regarded accompanist, H. K. N. Murthy has accompanied most of the leading Carnatic musicians in a career spanning more than 5 decades. His students, some of whom are acclaimed to be world class in India and the west, have gone on to play in Carnegie Hall, Lincoln Center, Sydney Opera house and Madras Music academy among other venues. Some of his leading disciples who are professional musicians include his son H. N. Bhaskar, Mysore Srikanth, Mysore Dayakar and H. M. Smitha.

Along with classical music, Mysore is also a center for learning of the light music genre, known as Sugama Sangeetha. Prominent singers of this genre include Mysore Ananthaswamy who brought many poems of great Kannada poets back to life and his son Raju Ananthaswamy.

Mysore has to its credit many renowned musicians like Raghu Dixit and Vijay Prakash to name a few. Mysore even witnessed a musical fight against corruption in January 2012 when a song called "Alarm – wake up guys" was released. The music for the song was composed by a young Mysorean named Phalgunn Maharishi and Kannada lyrics were written by Suraj Shankar, who also hails from Mysore. They are the grandsons of a noted novelist from Mysore, Mrs. Mangala Satyan. Their hard work was appreciated by many people when the song was premiered by TV9 Karnataka and many newspapers wrote about the two cousins and their work on Alarm.

== See also ==
- Official Mysore Tourism Web Site
- Official Election Website of Mysore www.mysoreelections.com
- Category:Musicians from Mysore
- Musicians of the Kingdom of Mysore
- List of Heritage Buildings in Mysore
