= The Bachelor of Arts =

Novel

- First edition
- Author: R. K. Narayan
- Language: English
- Genre: Novel
- Publisher: Nelson
- Publication date: 1937
- Publication place: India
- Media type: Print
- ISBN: 0-09-928224-0 (2000 ed.)
- OCLC: 6305101
- Dewey Decimal: 823
- LC Class: PR9499.3.N3 B3 1980
- Preceded by: Swami and Friends
- Followed by: The English Teacher

The Bachelor of Arts (1937) is a novel written by R. K. Narayan. It is the second book of a trilogy that begins with Swami and Friends and ends with The English Teacher. It is again set in Malgudi, the fictional town Narayan invented for his novels.

== Plot summary ==
The story follows the coming-of-age of Chandran, a young upper-middle class college graduate into adulthood. Chandran falls in love with Malathi, who he desires to marry. Their relationship is rejected by her parents as Chandran's horoscope describes him as having a Mangala Dosha – a superstition in which a marriage to a non-Manglik, Malathi, would lead to her early death. Malathi is then married to someone else.

Heartbroken, Chandran goes to Madras and lives on the streets. Disillusioned, Chandran embraces a nomadic life, becoming a Sanyasi and renouncing his life of worldly pursuits. Along his journey, Chandran is misunderstood as a great sage by the villagers he meets. After eight months, Chandran rouses to his senses, remembering his parents. He returns home, finding employment as a newsagent.

Despite his return home, Chandran still obsesses over Malathi. His father comes to him with a proposal of marriage to another girl, Sushila. Chandran is initially skeptical about finding love again, but later decides to meet her. Chandran falls in love with Sushila at first sight.
