= Swami and Friends =

Novel by Indian author R. K. Narayan

- Cover of Malgudi School days 2009 Puffin Classics edition
- Author: R. K. Narayan
- Cover artist: R. K. Laxman
- Language: English
- Genre: Novel
- Published: 1935 Hamilton
- Publication place: India
- Media type: Print
- Pages: 459
- ISBN: 978-0-09-928227-3
- OCLC: 360179
- Followed by: The Bachelor of Arts

Swami and Friends is a 1935 novel by R. K. Narayan, marking his debut as an English-language novelist from India. It is the first book in a trilogy set in the fictional town of Malgudi during British India. The novel is followed by The Bachelor of Arts and The English Teacher, completing the trilogy.

The novel follows a ten-year-old schoolboy, Swaminathan, and his attempts to court the favour of a much wealthier schoolboy, Rajam. Malgudi Schooldays is a slightly abridged version of Swami and Friends, and includes two additional stories featuring Swami from Malgudi Days and Under the Banyan Tree (1985).

== Summary ==
Swaminathan is a lazy schoolboy who lives with his father, mother, and grandmother in Malgudi. He attends the Albert Mission School, situated near the river Sarayu, with his friends Samuel, Sankar, Somu, and Mani— a serial repeater and Swami's closest friend. Swami, who is from an orthodox Brahmin family, has his religious beliefs frequently questioned and ridiculed by the fanatical Scriptures teacher Mr. Ebenezar. When an indignant Swami once naively asks how Jesus, being a God, could consume wine and meat, Ebenezar violently pulls his left ear. His father writes an angry letter of complaint to the headmaster, and Ebenezar is reprimanded.

The arrival of a new student, Rajam—the son of a wealthy police superintendent—threatens Mani's popularity, leaving Swami caught between his loyalty to an old friend and an attraction to an exciting new acquaintance. After an initial rivalry, Mani and Rajam reconcile, and the three boys form a close friend group. Swami brings Rajam to his house and introduces him to his grandmother.

Protests, part of Gandhi's Non-Cooperation movement, erupt through the town. Swami, who is swept up in nationalist fervour and boyish adventurism, participates in the protests, burning his cap—which he mistakenly thinks is foreign made—in a Swadeshi bonfire. In a similar protest in front of his own school, he breaks the window of the headmaster's room. Rajam's father leads a violent crackdown of the protest. The next day, a distressed Swami runs away from the school after the headmaster vows to punish participating students. He is subsequently expelled from Albert Mission and is compelled to enroll in the stricter and more rigorous Board High School.

Inspired by the Marylebone Cricket Club, Rajam and Swami decide to create their own—the 'Malgudi Cricket Club' (MCC)—gathering friends together for practice after school, in which Swami is chronically tardy due to his relatively late-afternoon dismissal from Board High School. With a match scheduled, Swami pleads with his new headmaster to allow him to leave class early; he refuses. An undeterred Swami is caught committing truancy after asking a doctor to write a note of absence and is beaten and expelled by the headmaster.

Now expelled from two schools, and fearing his father's wrath at home, Swami runs away from town. Becoming lost and hungry, Swami regrets his decision. Meanwhile, Swami's father attempts to locate his missing son. Swami is discovered by a man carrying a cart who promptly contacts his parents. Swami's relief at returning home turns to dismay when his friends report that they have lost their cricket game, and Rajam declares the end of their friendship.

One night, Mani informs Swami that Rajam and his family are relocating to Trichinopoly. Swami wakes up early the next day to attempt to reconcile and bid his farewell to Rajam, gifting him a copy of Hans Christen Anderson's Fairy Tales. He asks Rajam, as the train speeds away, if he would ever return, but his reply is drowned out by the sound of the locomotive. Swami weeps, wondering if Rajam would ever think of him again. Mani assures Swami that Rajam will write to him, which Swami doubts. Mani claims that he had given Swami's address to Rajam, but is unable to recollect it when Swami questions him.

== Publication ==
Swami and Friends is the first novel written by Sir R. K Narayan. It was published through the intervention of a friend and neighbour, "Kittu" Purna, who was studying at Oxford. Through him, Graham Greene came into contact with Narayan's work, became especially interested in it and took it upon himself to place the book with a reputable English publisher, Hamish Hamilton. Graham Greene was responsible for the title Swami and Friends, changing it from Narayan's Swami, the Tate, suggesting that it would have the advantage of having some resemblance to Rudyard Kipling's Stalky & Co.

Greene arranged the details of the contract and remained closely involved until the novel was published. Narayan's indebtedness to Greene is inscribed on the front endpaper of a copy of Swami and Friends Narayan presented to Greene: "But for you, Swami should be in the bottom of Thames now".

== Characters ==
=== Albert Mission School friends ===
- W.S. Swaminathan: A ten-year-old boy studying at Albert Mission School, Malgudi. He lives in Vinayaka Mudali Street. He is later transferred to Board High School.
- Mani: Swami's classmate at Albert Mission School, lives in Abu Lane, he is known as 'Mighty good-for-nothing'. He carries around a club sometimes, and threatens to beat his enemies to a pulp. He is hardly concerned about his studies.
- M. Rajam: Swami's classmate at Albert Mission School, lives in Lawley Extension. His father is the Deputy Police Superintendent of Malgudi. He previously studied at an English Boys' School, Madras. He is also the Captain of Malgudi Cricket Club (MCC).
- Somu : Monitor of 1st Form A Section, lives in Kabeer Street. He fails in 1st Form and is "automatically excluded from the group".
- Sankar: Swami's classmate in 1st Form A Section. His father gets transferred at the end of the term. He is the most brilliant boy of the class.
- Samuel ("The Pea"): Swami's classmate in 1st Form A Section. He is known as "The Pea" because of his height.

=== Swami's house ===
- W. T. Srinivasan: Swami's father, a lawyer
- Lakshmi: Swami's mother, housewife
- Swami'grandmother aka granny
- Swami's late grandfather (sub-magistrate)
- Subbu: Swami's younger brother

=== Others ===
- Rajam's father - A Deputy Police Superintendent
- Rajam's mother
- The Headmaster of Albert Mission School
- Mr. Ebenezer - A teacher at Albert Mission School, a Christian Ideologist
- The Head master of the Board School
- Dr. Kesavan - A physician in the Board School
- Mr. Nair - An officer at District Forest Office
- Ranga - A cart man
- Sir. Peter - a famous footballer

== Cricketers mentioned ==
- Jack Hobbs
- Donald Bradman
- Duleep
- Maurice Tate

== Cultural depictions ==
- Swami and Friends was adapted by actor-director Shankar Nag into the television drama series Malgudi Days in 1986. The series was directed by Nag and Carnatic musician L. Vaidyanathan composed the score. Swami was played by Master Manjunath (Manjunath Nayaker). R. K. Narayan's brother and acclaimed cartoonist R. K. Laxman was the sketch artist.

== Critical reception ==
On 5 November 2019 BBC News listed Swami and Friends on its list of the 100 most influential novels.
