= The English Teacher =

1945 novel by R. K. Narayan

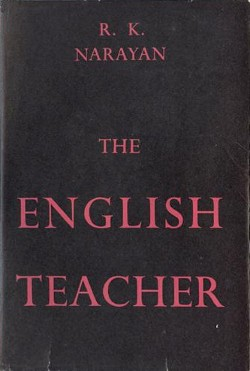
- First edition of The English Teacher by R. K. Narayan
- Author: R. K. Narayan
- Language: English
- Genre: semi-autobiographical novel
- Published: 1945 Eyre & Spottiswoode
- Publication place: India
- Media type: Print
- Pages: 184
- OCLC: 6305085
- Dewey Decimal: 823
- LC Class: PR9499.3.N3 E5 1980
- Preceded by: The Bachelor of Arts and Malgudi Days
- Followed by: Mr. Sampath – The Printer of Malgudi

The English Teacher is a 1945 novel written by R. K. Narayan. It is a part of a series of novels and collections of short stories set in "Malgudi". The English Teacher was preceded by Swami and Friends (1935), The Bachelor of Arts (1937) and Malgudi Days, (1943) and followed by Mr. Sampath – The Printer of Malgudi.

This novel, dedicated to Narayan's wife Rajam, is not only autobiographical but also poignant in its intensity of feeling. The story is a series of experiences in the life of Krishna, an English teacher, and his quest for inner peace and self-development after the traumatising death of his wife.

== Plot ==
As an English teacher and lecturer at Albert Mission College, Krishna has led a mundane and monotonous lifestyle comparable to that of a cow. But he also plays an important role in protecting Indian culture. His life changes when his wife, Susila, and their child, Leela, come to live with him. With their welfare on his hands, Krishna learns to be a proper husband and learns how to accept the responsibility of taking care of his family. He feels that his life has comparatively improved, as he understands that there's more meaning to life than to just teaching. The plot explores about Krishna's account on Susila's illness and events occurred afterwards. Susila might have been suffering from Malaria and Typhoid long before her symptoms appear according to research done by two Sri Lankan authors, Dr. Nishantha Karunarathna from Postgraduate Institute of Humanities and Social Sciences (PGIHS), University of Peradeniya and Mr. Lal Medawattegedara from Open University of Sri Lanka (OUSL).They even have gone on to say that Dr. Shankar is not negligent in his medical practice. Susila eventually passes away due to typhoid complications. Krishna, destroyed by her loss, has suicidal thoughts but gives them up for the sake of his daughter, Leela. He is lost and miserable after her death, but he receives a letter from a stranger who indicates that Susila has been in contact with him and that she wants to communicate with Krishna. This makes him more collected and cheerful, leading to a journey in search of enlightenment, with the stranger acting as a medium to Susila in the spiritual world. Leela, on the other hand, goes to a preschool where Krishna gets to meet the headmaster, a profound man who cares for the students in his school and teaches them moral values through his own methods. The Headmaster puts his students as his top priority but he does not care for his own family and children, eventually leaving them on the day predicted by an astrologer as the day of his death, which did not come true. Krishna is influenced by the headmaster, eventually learning to 'communicate' with Susila on his own, thus concluding the entire story with the quote that he felt 'a moment of rare immutable joy.

== Reception ==
In his critical study of Narayan's works, William Walsh called The English Teacher a "lightly buoyant, delicately developed account" of the writer's life.

It was also a Sunday Book Pick for Scroll.in, the contemporary review calling the novel as Narayan's "tenderest", "colored by his own grief" but not "devoid of humour and brevity."
