= Karnataka Kalamandira, Mysore =

Karnataka Kalamandira
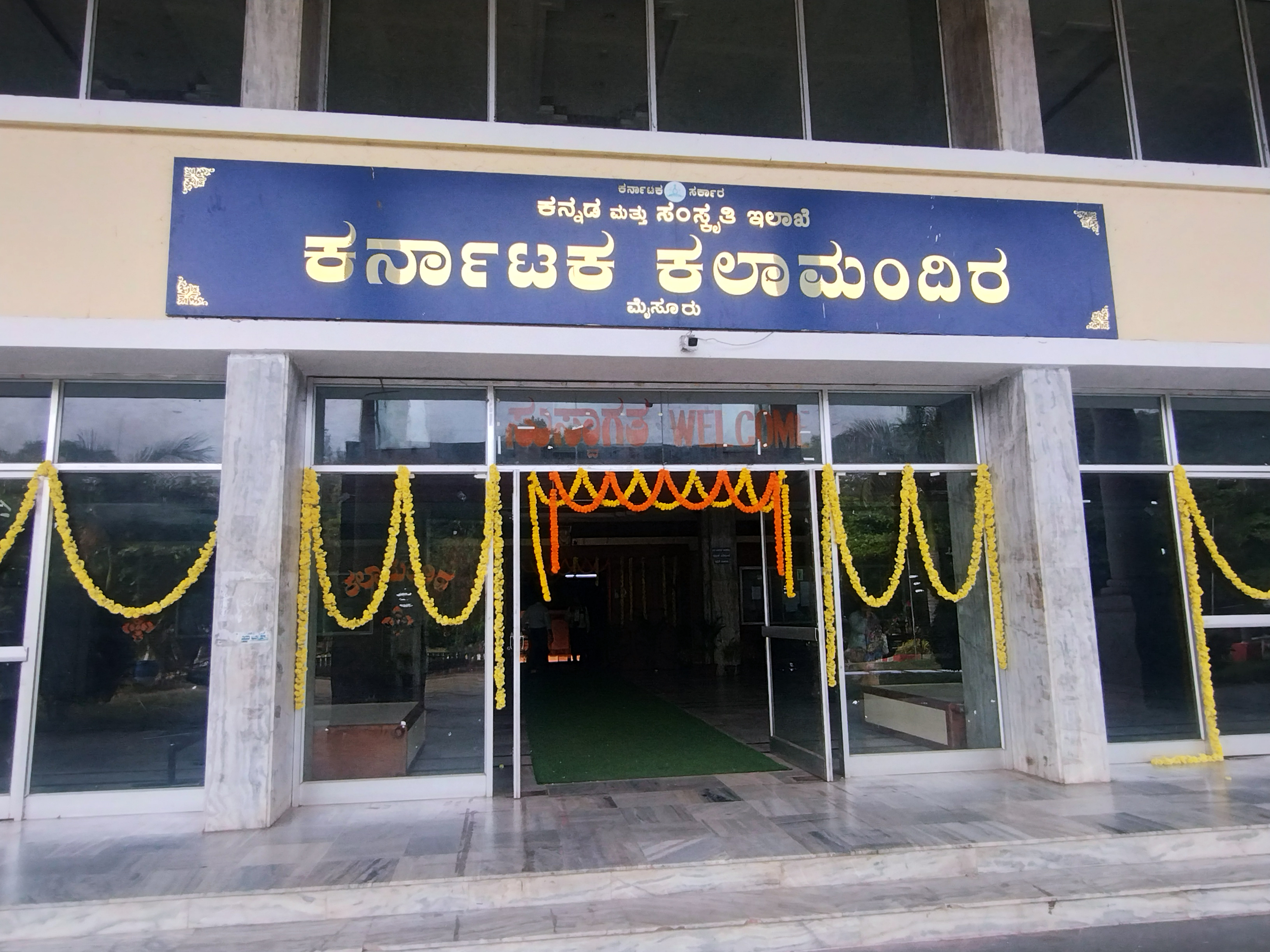
- Karnataka Kalamandira in 2025
- Formation: August 12, 1919
- Type: Theatre organization
- Purpose: Theatre and arts
- Location: Vinoba Road, Kukkarahalli, Kajjihundi, Mysore, Karnataka 570005
- Coordinates: 12.311722°N 76.637614°E

Karnataka Kalamandira is the oldest art institution in Karnataka, located in Mysuru. It was founded by Akkihebbal Narasimhaiah Subbarao (who was popularly called Aa. Na. Su.), on 12 August 1919

Karnataka Kalamandira celebrated its centenary anniversary in 2019.

== Media gallery ==
Karnataka Kalamandira in 2025
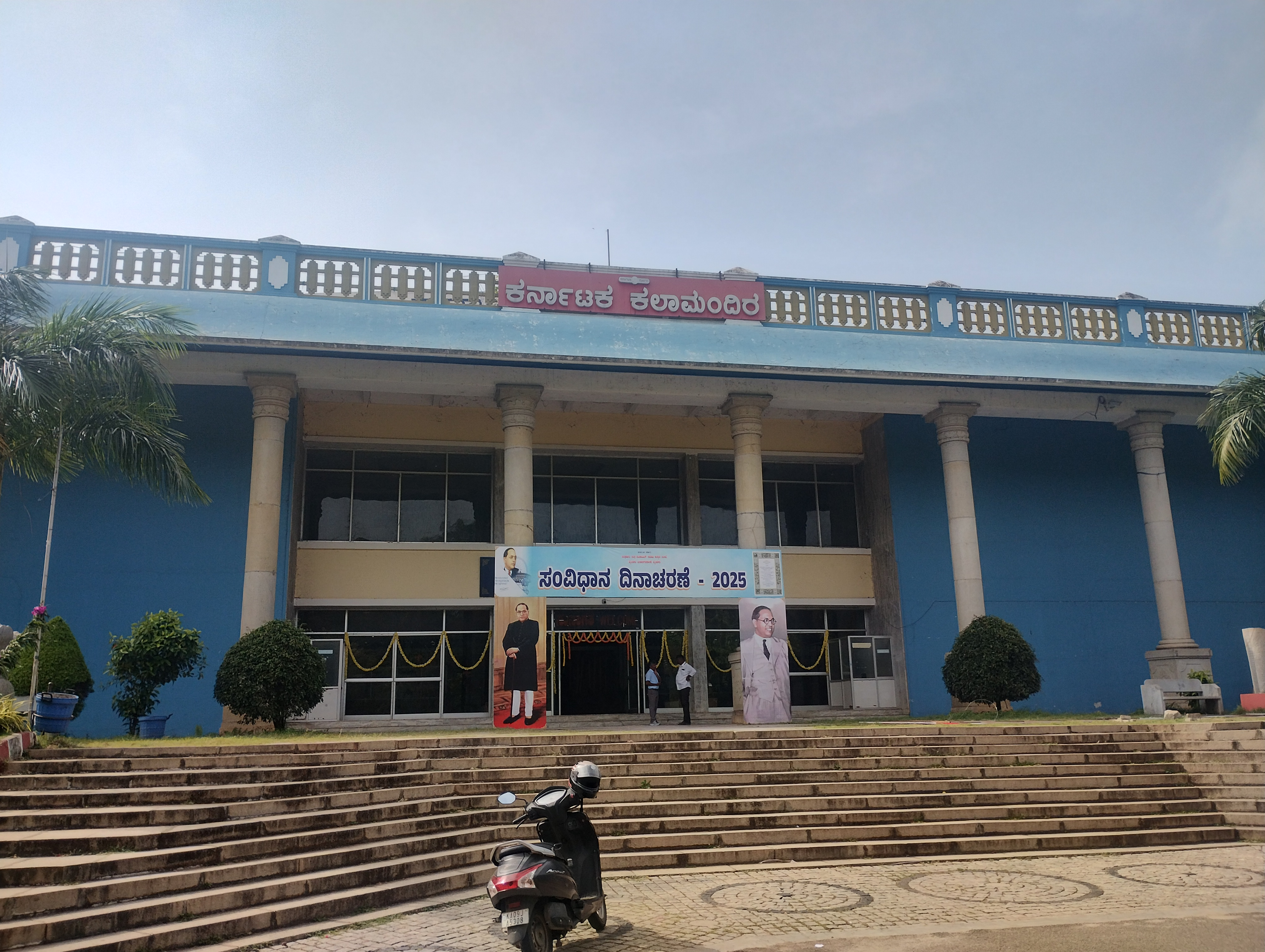

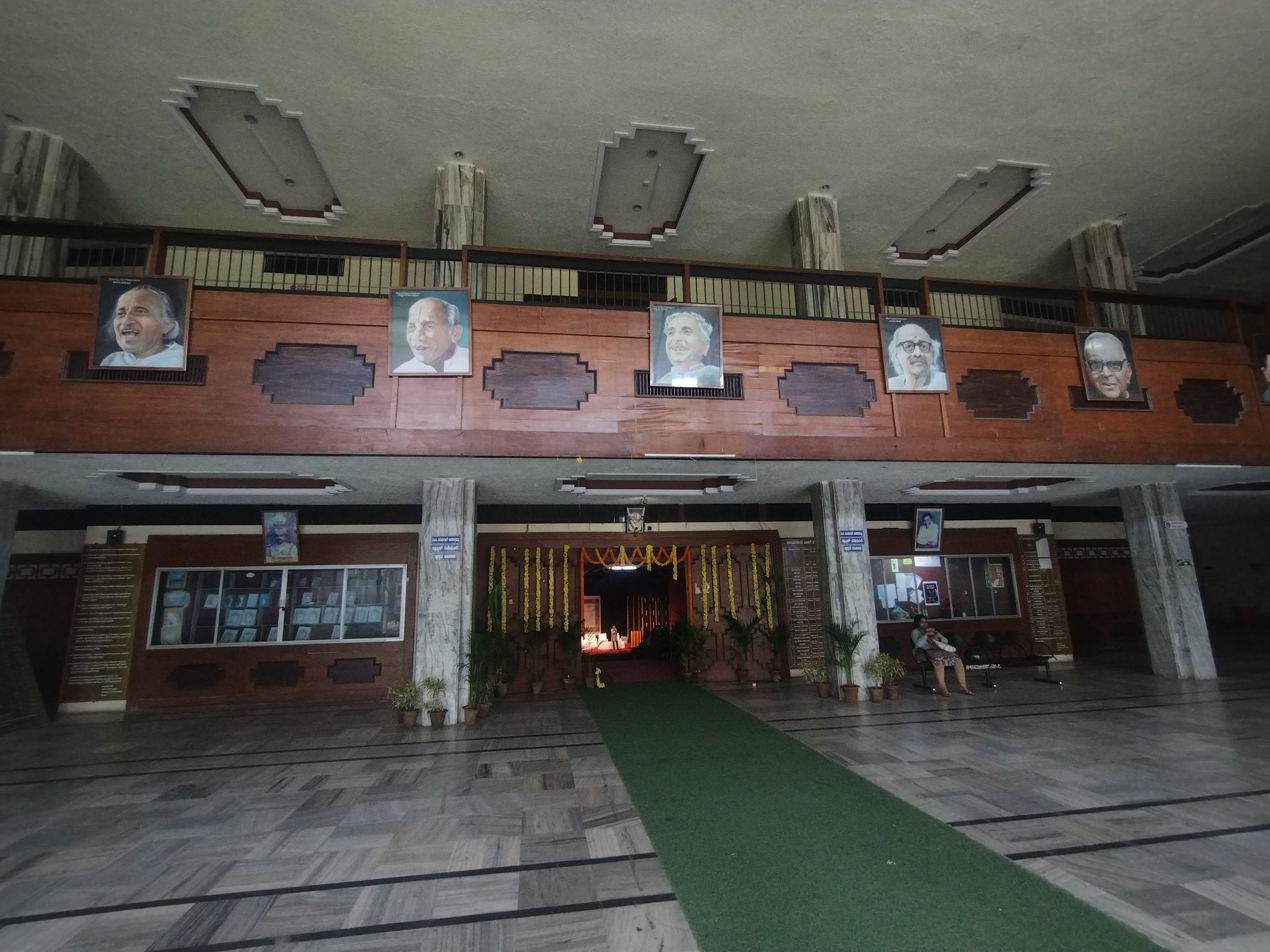

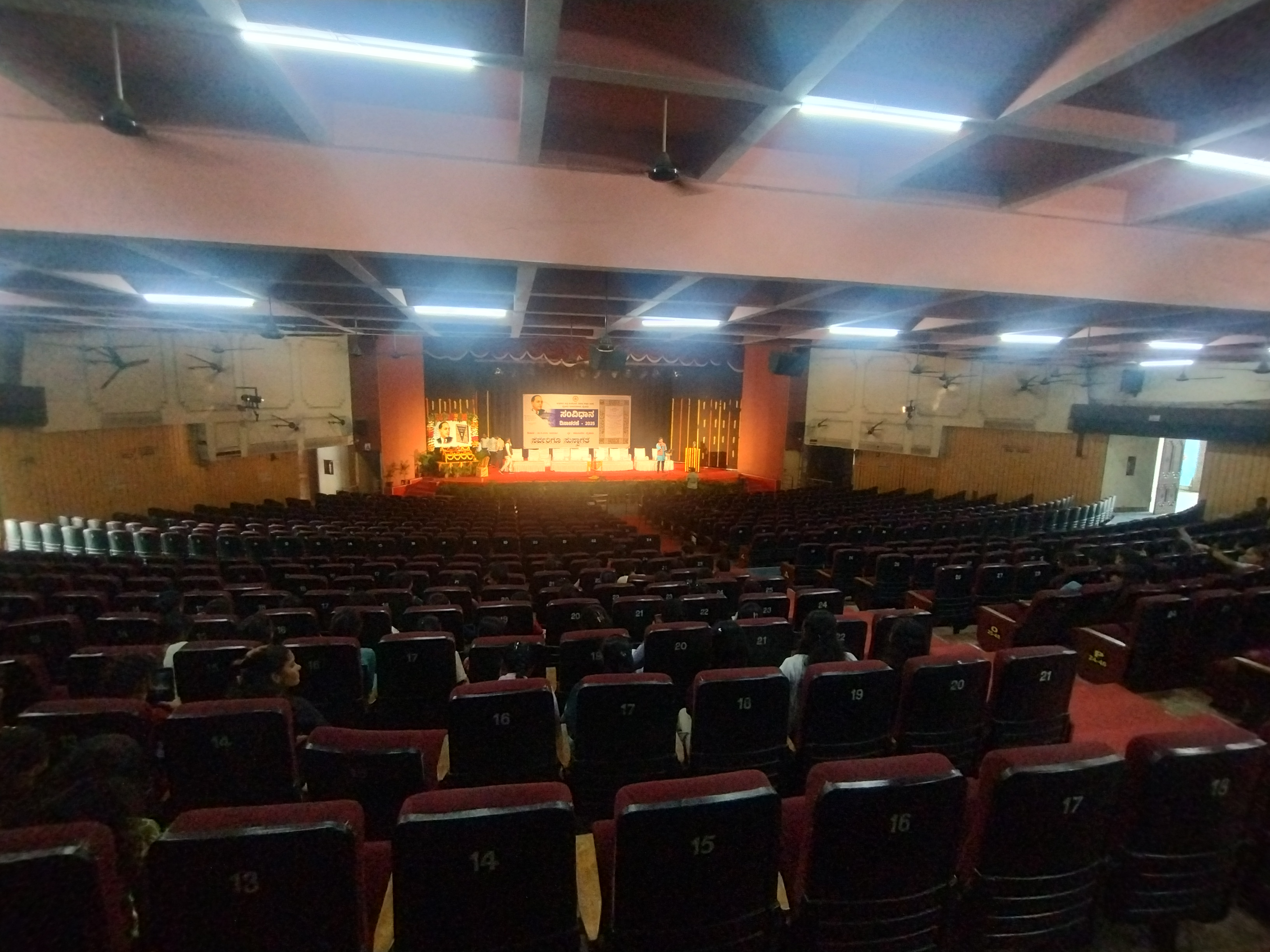

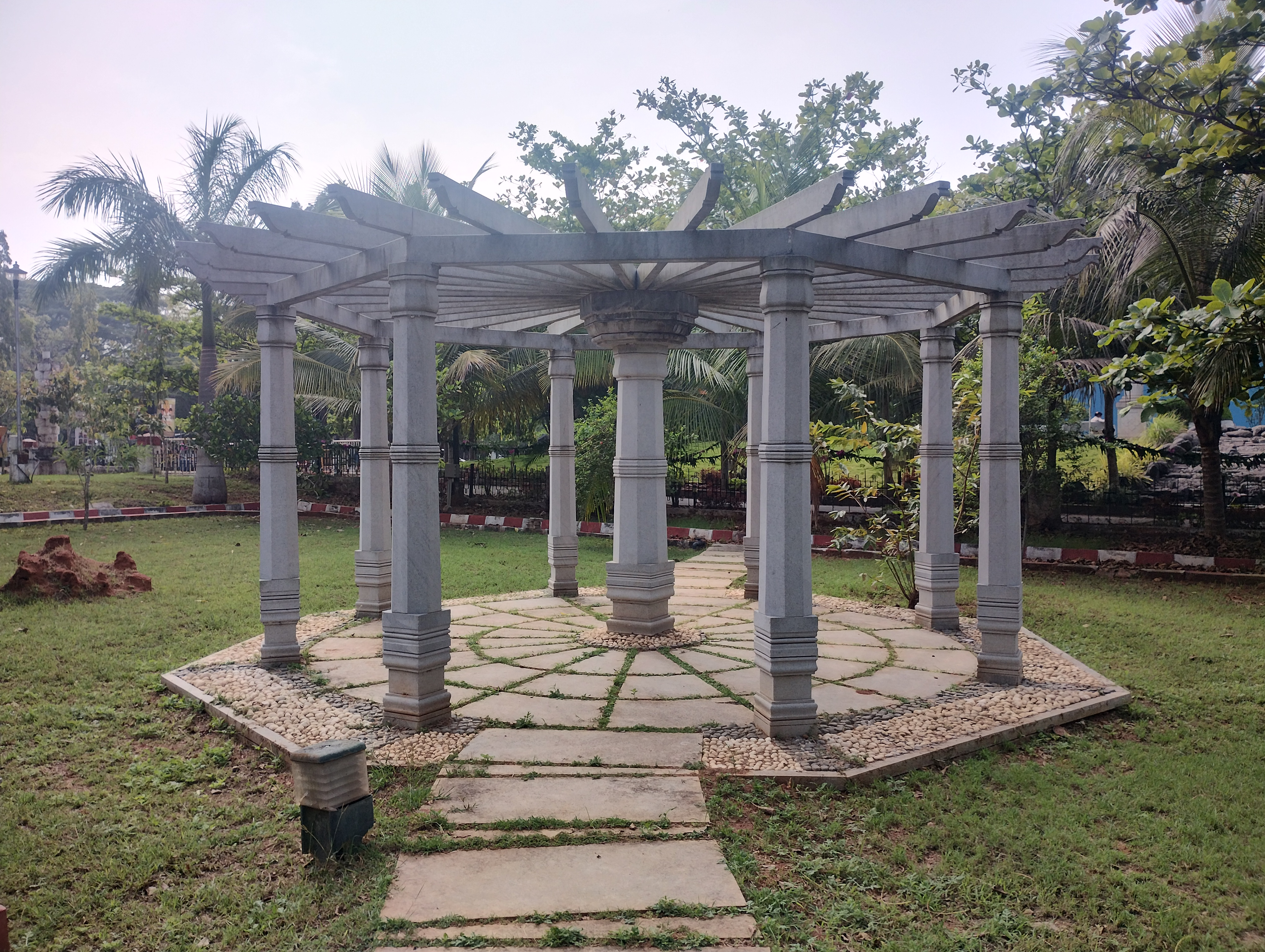

== See also ==
- Rangayana, a theatre institute inside Karnataka Kalamandira campus
