= Rangayana =

Theatre institute in Mysore, Karnataka, India

Coordinates: 12.311378280338962°N 76.63773880712374°E

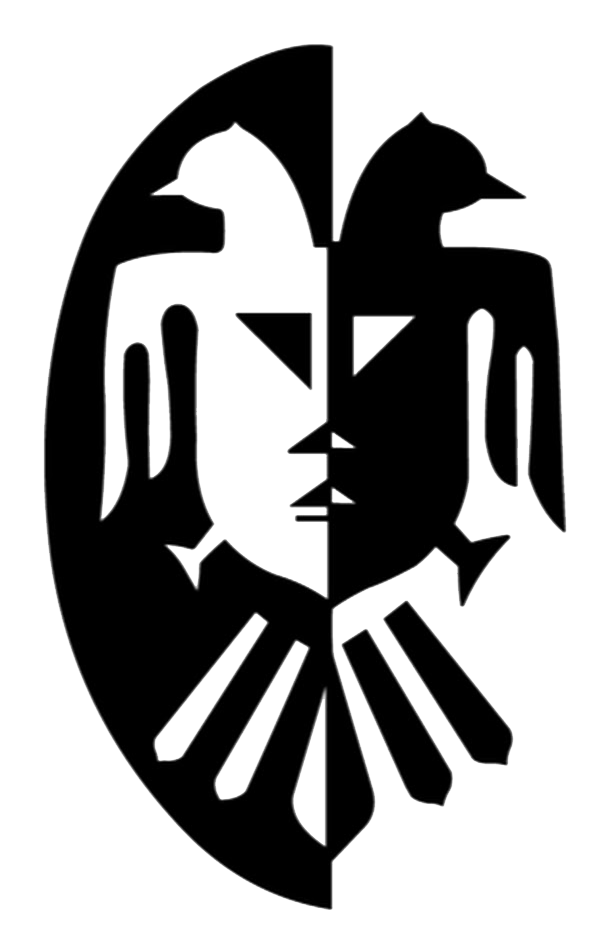
- Official logo of Rangayana

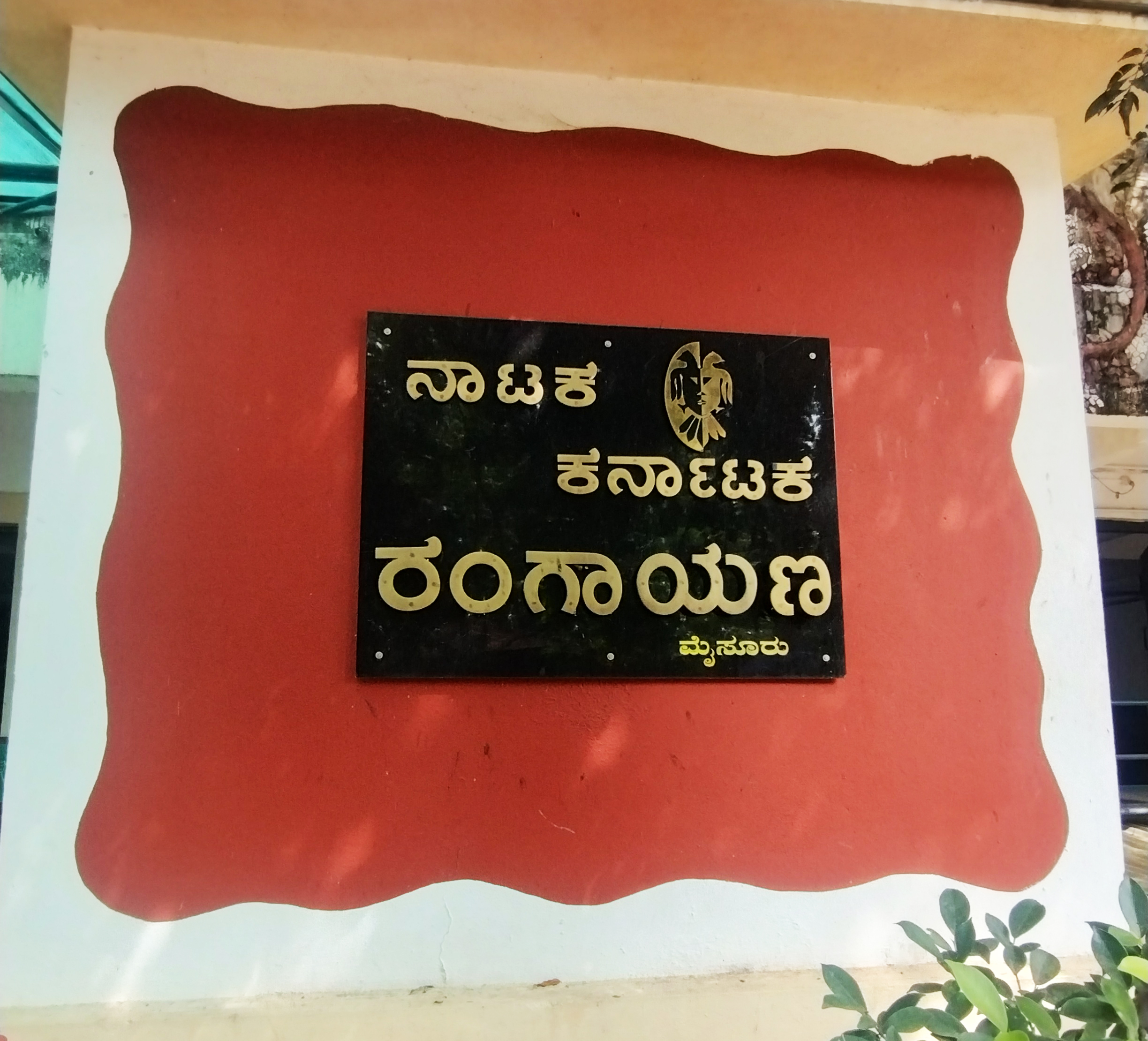
- Formation: 1989
- Type: Theatre group
- Purpose: Theatre and arts
- Location: Mysuru, Karnataka, India
- Artistic director: Addanda Karyappa
- Notable members: B. V. Karanth (Founding Director)
- Website: rangayanamysore.karnataka.gov.in/en

Map showing Rangayana, Vinoba Road, Kukkarahalli, Kalamandira Campus, Mysuru, Karnataka

Rangayana (Kannada: ರಂಗಾಯಣ) is a theatre institute which operates from Mysore, Karnataka, India. It works as an autonomous cultural institute. The organization consists of a professional repertory company, a theatre-training institute and a documentation and research centre. Rangayana offers courses in stage craft, preparation and presentation of plays in Kannada. It also conducts programs for promotion of Kannada theatre. Rangayana hosts a theatre festival in Mysore every year. Rangayana is the only government sponsored repertory theatre in the country. It is also undertaking a project to introduce theatre to kids and has created a children's repertory in association with the International Theatre Institute and Swedish International Development Cooperation Agency.

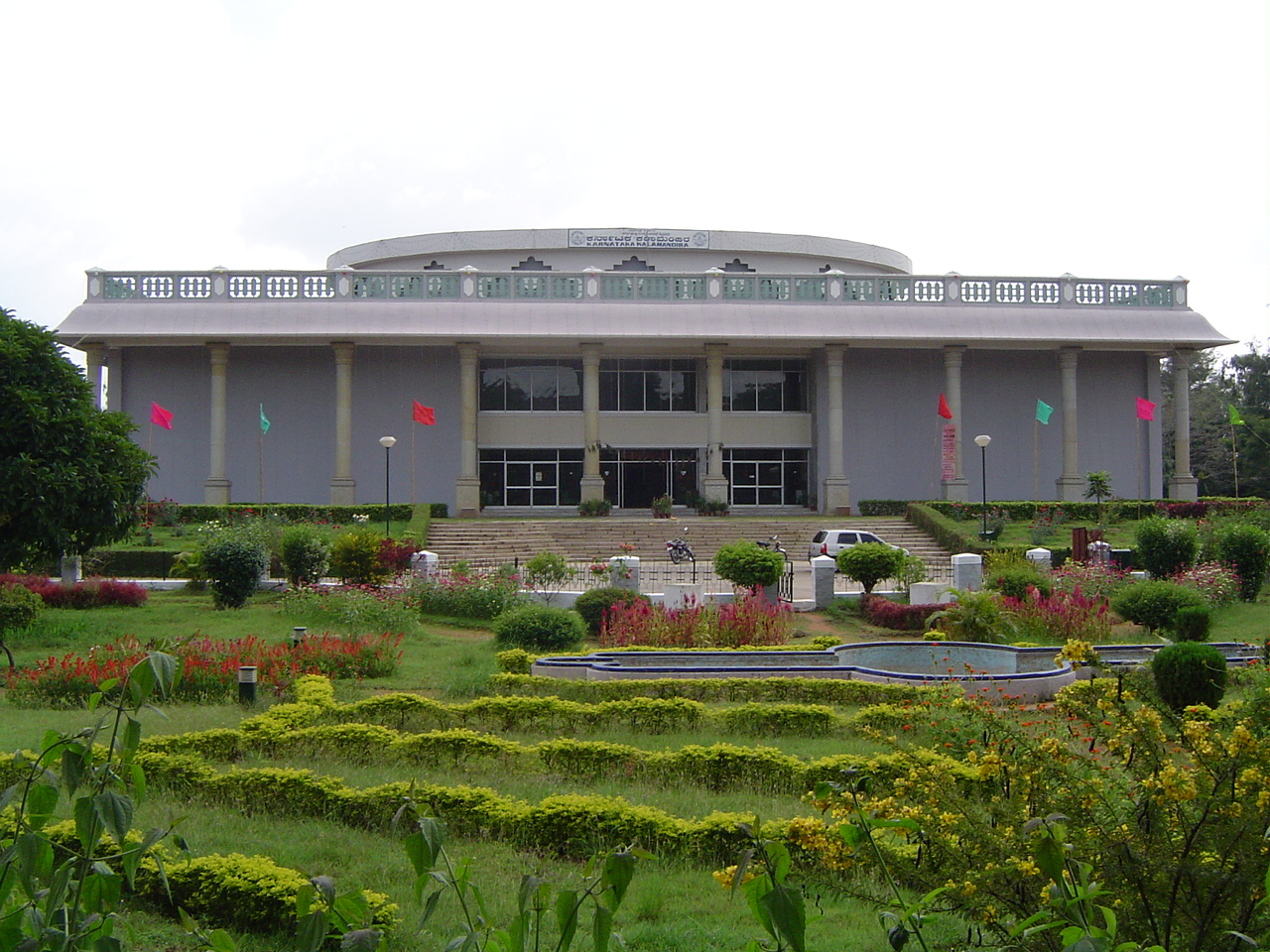
Repertorie Rangayana is located behind pictured Kalamandira

== History ==
Rangayana was started by Government of Karnataka in 1989 for promotion of stage crafts and plays. The project was the brainchild of B.V. Karanth and he was appointed as the first director of the institute. He continued in that position till 1995 when C.Basavalingiah took over from him. Prasanna was appointed as the third director of Rangayana in 2001. It was during his time that Rangayana started weekend performances. However Prasanna resigned from the position in 2003 due to conflict of interest between him and the Department of Kannada and Culture. Prasanna had a clash with the Government of Karnataka too when the government decided to cut back on the annual grants provided to Rangayana in 2003. However, due to strong protests by various cultural bodies the government continued with its grants. Chidambara Rao Jambe of Ninasam fame was appointed as the fourth director . Addanda C Cariappa is the present director.

== Divisions and infrastructure ==
Rangayana consists of professional repertory company, a theatre training institute called Bharatiya Ranga Shikshana Kendra and a documentation and research centre called Sriranga Ranga Mahiti and Samshodana Kendra.

Repertory company started performing two times a week regularly on weekends at Bhoomigeeta theatre at Mysore in 2002. Later in 2006, the weekend theatre program was reduced to one day a week citing busy schedule of artists. In addition, regular tours are conducted throughout Karnataka performing in different towns. It also attends national drama festivals held at different cities of India like New Delhi, Mumbai and Bhopal.

The theatre training institute was started by Rangayana in 2001-02. It provides vocational training for teachers, social activists and amateur theatre personalities. The institute offers a one-year diploma course in theatre. In addition, the institute has established links with the state government and conducts training in the field of communication skills, personality development, leadership development etc. for the employees.

The documentation and research institute hosts a library related mainly to theatre. The center hosts seminars and discussions throughout the year at Mysore. A huge repertoire of untapped folk proverbs, epigrams, ballads, images and metaphors can still be found in the center.

Rangayana hosts different stages for performance such as Bhoomigitha, Vanaranga, Sriranga, Kutira and an art gallery called Lankesh art gallery bearing the name of popular writer and journalist P. Lankesh.

== Activities ==
Rangayana organizes theme based national festivals that receive good response and attracts enthusiasts from all over the country. Theatres groups performing in different Indian languages and a troupe from abroad take part in the festival every year. Festival also hosts handicrafts exhibition, book exhibition, art exhibition, food festival, seminar and interaction with leading theatre personalities.

In order to reach people all over Karnataka, repertory conducts annual tours to different towns in the state which is called Ranga Yatre.

== Media gallery ==
Rangayana in 2025
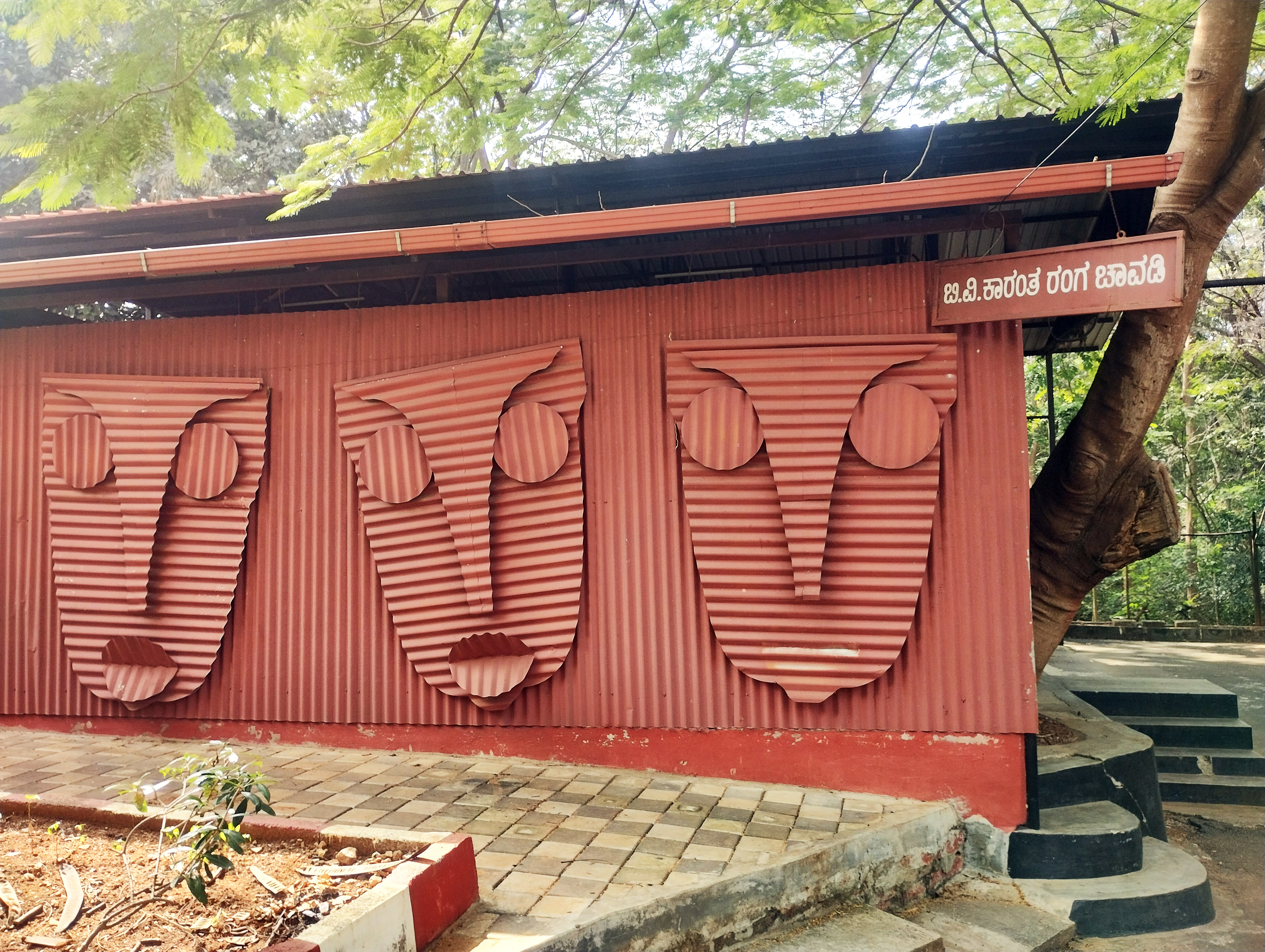

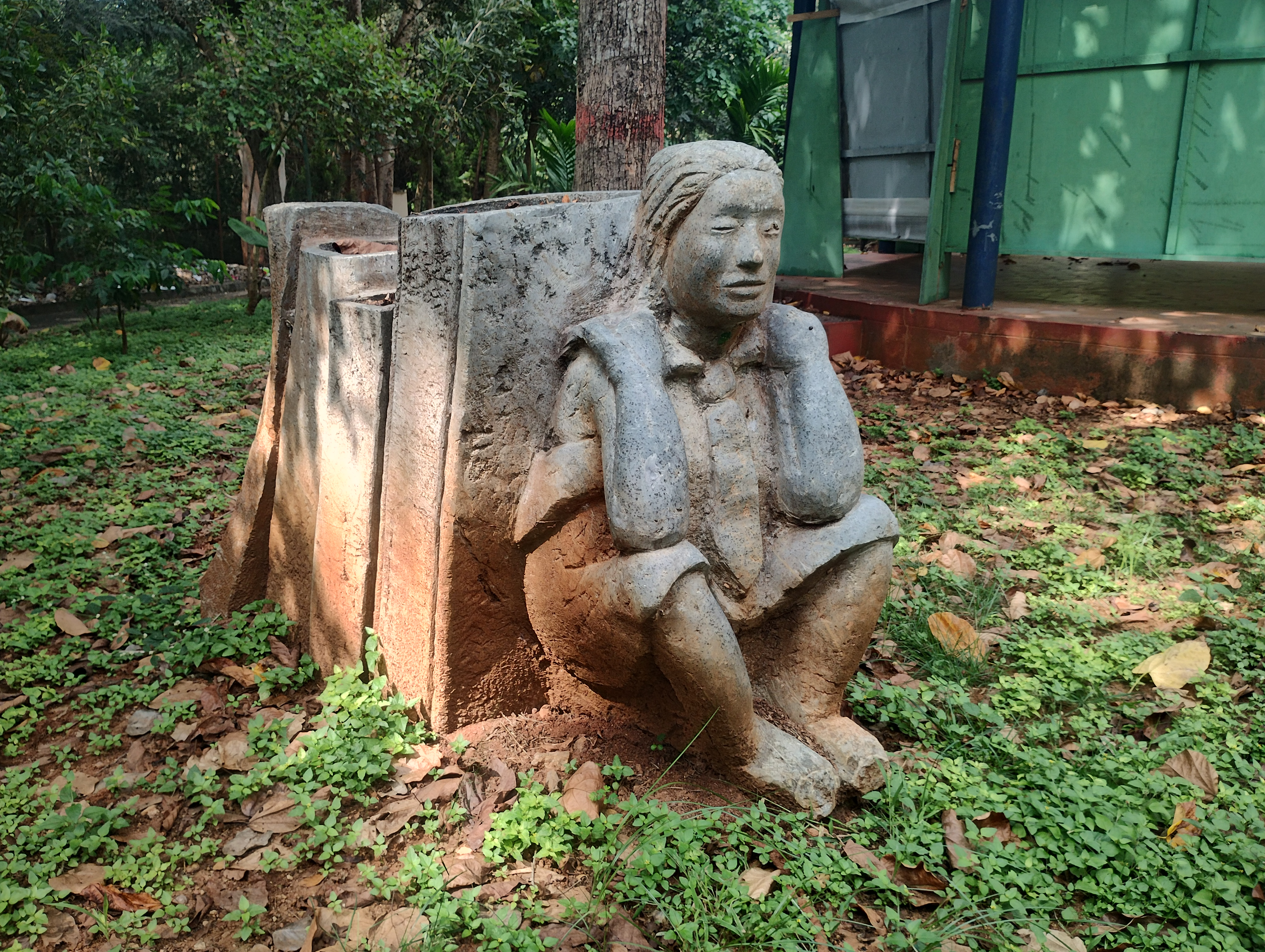

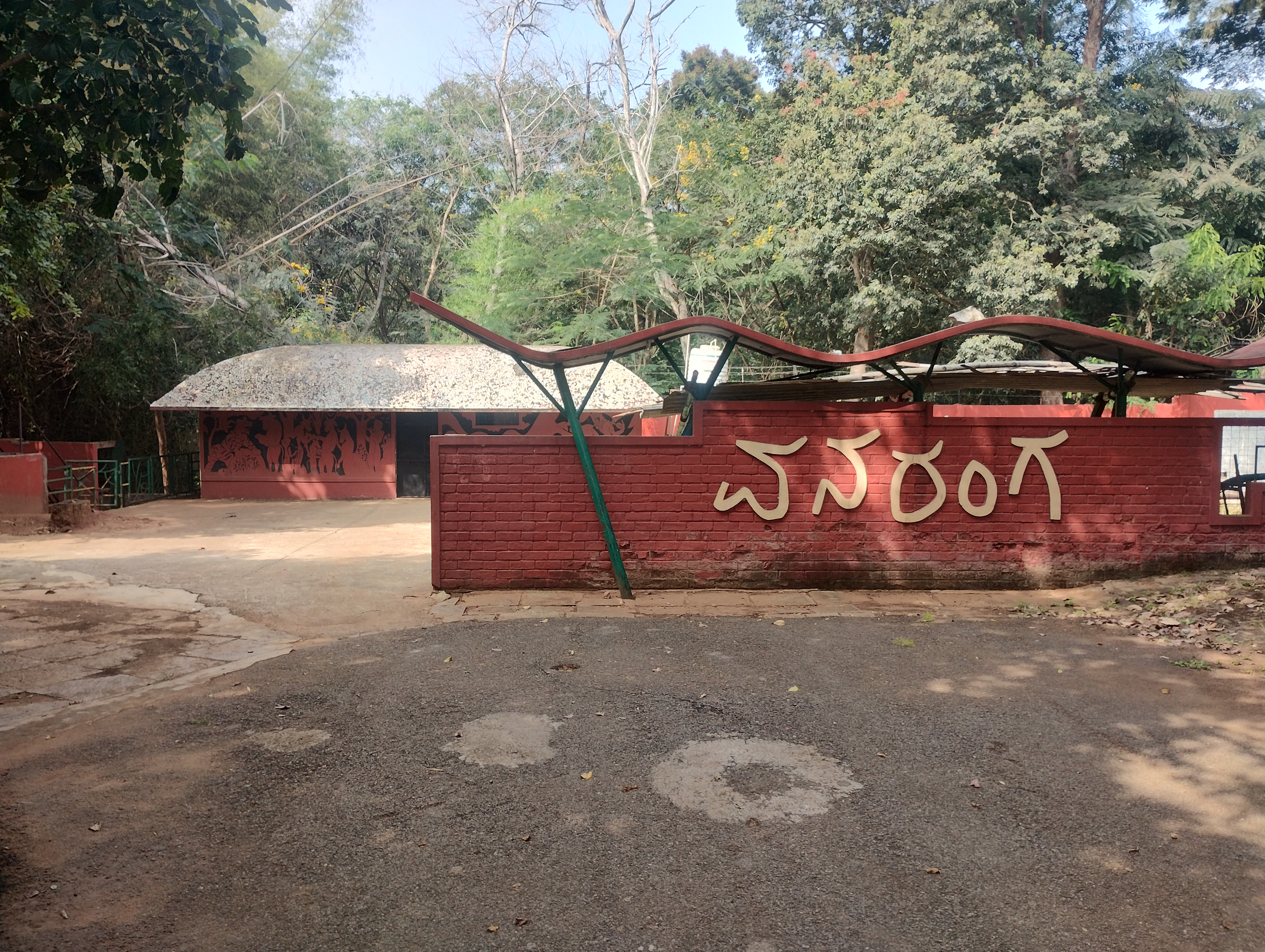

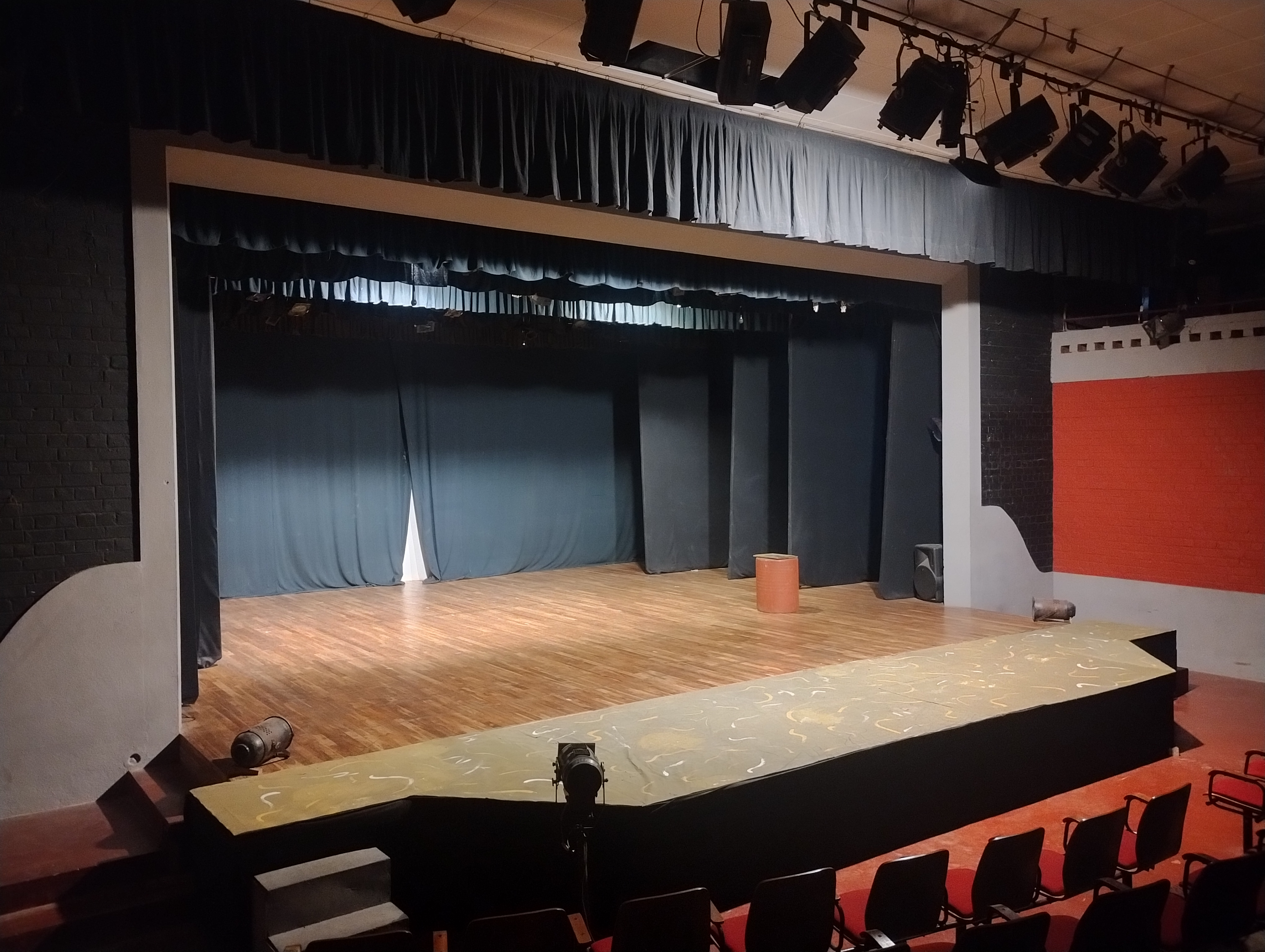

=== Arts in Rangayana ===
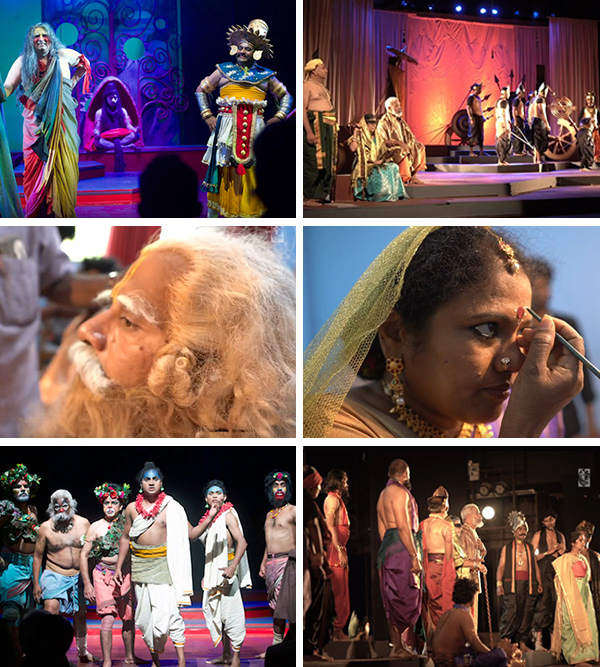
Artists in Rangayana

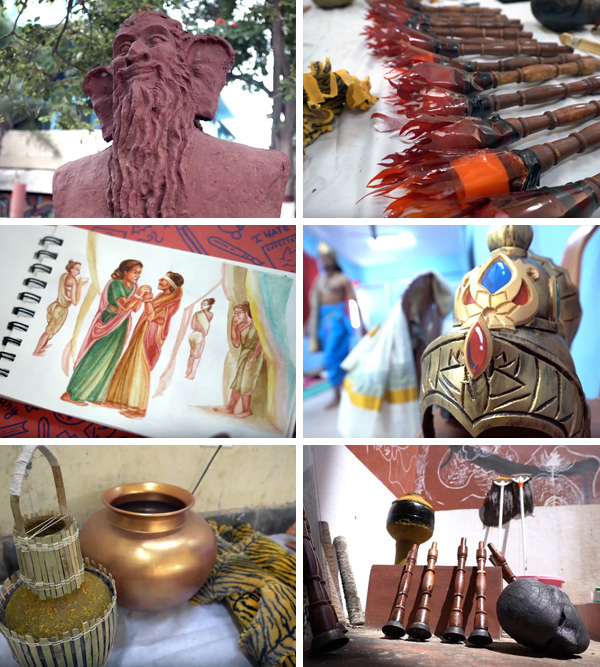
Craftsmanship in Rangayana

== See also ==
- Karnataka Kalamandira, the oldest art institution in Karnataka
- B. V. Karanth
