= Kumari Kamala =

Indian dancer and actress (1934–2025)

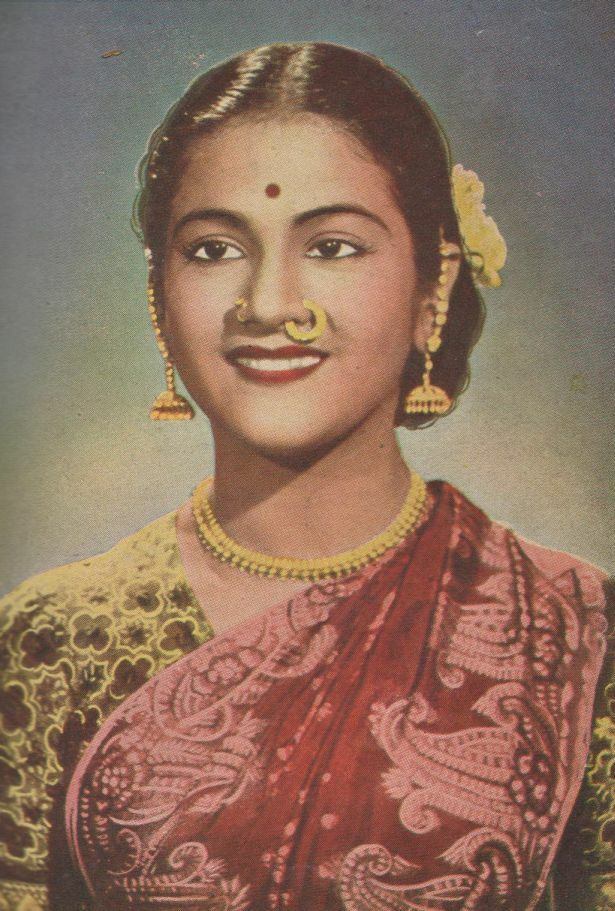
- Kamala in the early 1950s
- Born: 16 June 1934; Mayuram, Madras Presidency, British India
- Died: 23 November 2025 (aged 91); California, U.S.
- Other names: Baby Kamala, Kamla Laxman, Kamala Laxman, Kamala Lakshman, Kamala Narayan, Kamala Lakshmi Narayanan
- Occupations: Dancer, actress
- Spouses: R. K. Laxman (div. 1960): T. V. Lakshminarayanan

Kumari Kamala (16 June 1934 – 23 November 2025), also known as Kamala Lakshman, was an Indian dancer and actress. Initially featured as a child dancer, Kamala appeared in almost 100 Tamil, Hindi, Telugu and Kannada films throughout her career. In the 1970s, she became a teacher of the Vazhuvoor style of dance in which she specialised.

== Early life and career ==
Kamala was born at Mayuram (now known as Mayiladuthurai), in what is now Tamil Nadu, India, and belonged to the Tamil Brahmin community. Her sisters Rhadha and Vasanti are also dancers. At an early age, Kamala began taking lessons in the Kathak dance style from Lachhu Maharaj in Bombay and Bharatnatyam. She also took lessons in Hindustani classical music from Shankar Rao Vyas. She was discovered at age four by Tamil film director A.N. Kalyanasundaram Iyer when he attended a dance recital. He cast her in small roles in his films Valibar Sangham (1938) and Ramanama Mahimai (1939) where she was billed as Kamala. Her dancing was noticed by other filmmakers and she started appearing in Hindi films with Jailor in 1938 and Kismet and Ram Rajya in 1943. Kamala's mother moved to Madras so her daughter could train under the Bharatanatyam teachers Kattumannarkoil Muthukumara Pillai and Vazhuvoor B. Ramaiyah Pillai. Kamala's first role in a successful Tamil film came in 1944 with Jagathalapratapan where she performed the Paampu attam. Kamala played a double role in her next film Sri Valli (1945) and also played Krishna in the film Meera. However, it was her film Nam Iruvar that would make an impact on Tamil cinema. Nam Iruvar was full of patriotism and Gandhian songs, and its dances helped to revitalize and legitimize Bharatanatyam. The film is credited with sparking a "cultural revolution" throughout the Tamil speaking areas of India.

In 1953, Kamala was invited to perform for Queen Elizabeth II during her coronation festivities. In the late 1950s, she toured internationally, performing in China and Japan. In 1970, the government of India awarded her the Padma Bhushan, India's third highest civilian award. She also taught dance for two terms at Colgate University after being awarded its Branta Professorship in 1975. In 1980, Kamala moved to New York City and began teaching classical dance. She established a dance school in Long Island, Shri Bharatha Kamalalaya. In 2010, she received a National Heritage Fellowship from the National Endowment for the Arts for her contributions to the arts.

== Personal life and death ==
Kamala married twice. Her first husband was the cartoonist R. K. Laxman. This marriage ended in divorce in 1960. They did not have any children.

This was one of the earliest divorces among the Hindu community in India, where divorce was simply not available for Hindus until 1956. The years of this marriage were the years when Kamala attained fame, and she was known as "Kamala Laxman". This later became a cause for confusion, because R.K. Laxman's second wife was also named Kamala Laxman. To reduce the confusion, Kamala took the new name "Kumari Kamala" in later life. Kamala later married again, in defiance of Hindu religious practice. Not much is known of Kamala's second husband, T. V. Lakshminarayanan, who died in 1983. Kamala had a son named Jainand Narayan, who served in the United States Army.

Kamala died in California on 23 November 2025, at the age of 91.

== Awards ==
- 1967 – Kalaimamani
- 1968 – Central Sangeet Natak Akademi Award
- 1970 – Padma Bhushan
- 1975 – Branta Professorship from Colgate University
- 1989 – E. Krishna Iyer Medal from the Sruti Foundation
- 1993 – Sangeeta Ratnakara at the Cleveland Thyagaraja Aradhana
- 2002 – Platinum Jubilee award from Madras Music Academy
- 2010 – National Heritage Fellowship
- 2012 – Soorya Lifetime Achievement Award in 4th St. Louis Indian Dance Festival

== Partial filmography ==
- 1938 Valibar Sangham
- 1938 Jailor
- 1939 Ramanama Mahimai
- 1941 Kanjan
- 1942 Chandni
- 1943 Kismet
- 1943 Ram Rajya
- 1944 Jagathalapratapan
- 1945 Sri Valli
- 1945 Meera
- 1945 En Magan
- 1947 Ekambavanan
- 1947 Katagam
- 1947 Mahathma Udangar
- 1947 Nam Iruvar
- 1948 Vedhala Ulagam
- 1950 Vijayakumari
- 1950 Digambara Samiyar
- 1951 Lavanya
- 1951 Devaki
- 1951 Mohana Sundaram
- 1952 Parasakthi
- 1953 Manithan
- 1953 Ulagam
- 1954 Vilayattu Bommai
- 1954 Manohara Tamil/Telugu
- 1956 Devta
- 1956 Naane Raja
- 1956 Chori Chori
- 1956 Kula Dheivam
- 1956 Charana Daasi
- 1957 Kathputli
- 1958 Bhookailas
- 1958 Thirumanam
- 1958 Illarame Nallaram
- 1958 Yahudi
- 1958 Kathavarayan as Shiva dancer
- 1959 Sivagangai Seemai
- 1959 Naach Ghar
- 1959 Naya Sansar
- 1960 Parthiban Kanavu
- 1960 Paavai Vilakku
- 1960 Veerakkanal
- 1961 Bhaktakuchela
- 1961 Saugandh
- 1962 Konjum Salangai
- 1962 Sumaithaangi
- 1971 Jwala
- 1973 Chenda
