= Sumaithaangi =

- Theatrical release poster
- Directed by: C. V. Sridhar
- Screenplay by: C. V. Sridhar
- Based on: Sumaithaangi by Ra. Ki. Rangarajan
- Produced by: Kovai Chezhiyan
- Starring: Gemini Ganesan; Devika; R. Muthuraman
- Cinematography: A. Vincent
- Edited by: N. M. Shankar
- Music by: Viswanathan–Ramamoorthy
- Production company: Visalakshi Films
- Release date: 7 December 1962
- Running time: 160 minutes
- Country: India
- Language: Tamil

Sumaithaangi (transl. Bearer of Burdens) is a 1962 Indian Tamil-language drama film, written and directed by C. V. Sridhar. The film stars Gemini Ganesan, Devika and R. Muthuraman. Based on Ra. Ki. Rangarajan's novel of the same name that was serialised in Kumudam, it revolves around a man who could not lead his life the way he wanted, and is forced to undergo many sacrifices. The film, produced by Kovai Chezhiyan, was released on 7 December 1962. Ganesan won the Film Fans Association Award for Best Actor

== Plot ==
Ramu (R. Muthuraman) leads a middle-class family while supporting his retired father Sarangapani, younger brother Babu (Gemini Ganesan), and younger sister Lakshmi (L. Vijayalakshmi). On a dare from his college mates, Babu successfully woos Radha (Devika), the daughter of their former schoolteacher Rathnavel (V. S. Raghavan). But at this point, Ramu's unemployment plunges the family into financial distress. As a result, Babu is forced to abandon his studies and love life to take up a job.

Meanwhile, Lakshmi falls in love and gets married. Babu’s honest act of returning a lost purse to a retired judge leads to a marriage proposal for Babu with the judge’s daughter, Indira Devi—whose seizure episodes are hidden by Sarangapani from Babu for the family’s sake.

Rathnavel proposes Radha’s marriage to Babu, but Sarangapani rejects it. Pressured by his family, Babu agrees to marry Indira Devi, but the marriage is called off when she has a seizure on the wedding day. Babu continues to sacrifice, giving his bonus money to his sister’s husband for a job deposit.

Balaji, a friend of Nagesh and Rathnavel’s relative, offers Babu a job, but Ramu takes it to reclaim his breadwinner role. A dejected Babu resigns and isolates himself, ignoring his family’s pleas to return.

As Radha’s wedding to Balaji nears, Lakshmi persuades Radha to reconsider her love for Babu. Balaji agrees to cancel the wedding. But Babu, unaware of this, leaves his family. He sends a letter to Ramu explaining his decision. Ramu, finding out from the letter's postmark that Babu is in Kodaikanal, takes Rathnavel and Radha to Kodaikanal in search of Babu.

In Kodaikanal, the trio's car is delayed by a herd of cattle. Then comes a procession of about 40 Catholic priests approaching the town's famed La Saleth Church, reciting the Lord's Prayer in English. As the priests move to a post-confessional prayer, Radha is shocked to see that Babu is one among them. Babu too spots the trio and looks at them stoically for a while. He then moves on, joining in the procession's recital of the Ignatian Suscipe and another portion of the post-confessional prayer. The film ends with a shot of the church’s altar.

== Cast ==
- Gemini Ganesan as Babu
- Devika as Radha
- R. Muthuraman as Ramu
- L. Vijayalakshmi as Lakshmi
- Nagesh
- Raja
- Leelavathi
- K. Sarangapani
- V. S. Raghavan as Rathnavel
- K. Balaji
- S. A. Natarajan
- K. R. Indira Devi
- G. Sakunthala
- Kumari Kamala as dancer (four roles) in the song Malaiyai Padaithavan

== Production ==
Sumaithaangi is based on Ra. Ki. Rangarajan's novel of the same name that was serialised in Kumudam. Mid-way through production it was retitled Aayiram Vaasal Idhayam (transl. A heart with a thousand entrances), but this was reversed. The song "Manithan Enbavan" was shot at Marina Beach.

== Soundtrack ==
The music was composed by Viswanathan–Ramamoorthy, with lyrics by Kannadasan. The song "Endhan Paruvathin Kelvikku" was replaced as "Endha Paarvaiyin Kelvikku" in the film.

Song	Singers	Length
"En Annai Seitha"	S. Janaki	03:37
"Endhan Paarvaiyin"	P. B. Sreenivas, S. Janaki	03:24
"Mambazhathu Vandu"	P. B. Sreenivas, S. Janaki	03:30
"Manithan Enbavan"	P. B. Sreenivas	03:25
"Mayakkamma"	P. B. Sreenivas	02:39
"Puriyadhu"	P. B. Sreenivas	04:41
"Radhaiketra Kannano"	S. Janaki	03:26
"Malaiyai Padaithavan"	S. Janaki	06:14

== Release and reception ==
Sumaithaangi was released on 7 December 1962. Kanthan of Kalki positively reviewed the film for the cast performances, particularly Radha. Ganesan won the Film Fans Association Award for Best Actor. Director Vasanth said, "Sumaithangi made a huge impact on me. I cried watching it and emerged from the cinema hall as a different person. I think a film should teach you something and bring about a change".
