= Ra. Ki. Rangarajan =

Writer

- Born: 5 October 1927; Kumbakonam, Madras Presidency, British India (now Tamil Nadu, India)
- Died: 18 August 2012 (aged 84); Chennai, Tamil Nadu, India
- Occupations: Journalist and prolific author
- Known for: Novels, short stories, essays, translations and other works
- Notable work: Naan, Krishna Devarayan, Sumai Thaangi

Rayampettai Krishnamacharya Rangarajan (1927 – 18 August 2012), popularly known as Ra Ki (Tamil: ரா.கி.), was a Tamil journalist and prolific author of novels, short stories, essays, translations and other works. Rangarajan wrote under 10 pen names including: Mohini for historical novels, T. Duraisami for family dramas, Surya for youthful romance, Krishnakumar for mysteries, K. Malathi for postal-related stories, Mulri, Vinodh, Hamsa and Avittam for another genres.

== Life and works ==
Rangarajan was born in Kumbakonam to Sanskrit scholar R.V. Krishnamacharya. Rangarajan began writing at the age of 16 for Sakthi, a literary magazine run by V. Govindan. Later, he worked for another journal Kalachakkaram. He then became associated with the popular Tamil weekly Kumudam for over four decades (~1950-1990) during which time he became a household name among Tamil readers. He wrote more than 1,500 short stories and over 50 novels that included several translated works from English such as Papillon and some Sidney Sheldon and Jeffrey Archer novels. He was the first person to write a Tamil historical novel (Naan, Krishna Devarayan) in first-person narrative, inspired by the English novel I, Claudius. Rangarajan said he wrote the novel "because not much has been written about Krishna Deva Raya or the Vijayanagar Empire. He was one of the greatest kings with many dimensions." The novel involved extensive research, including visits to libraries, as well as discussions with historians and artists. Rangarajan stated that he was "an admirer of Kalki Krishnamurthy" and that he "tried to emulate his style." Rangarajan said his inspirations were Charles Dickens, Alexandre Dumas, and Jeffrey Archer in English; Kalki Krishnamurthy in Tamil.

Some of his stories were made into films, notably including Sumaithaangi (1962).

He died 18 August 2012, at 85 years old. He had two sons and three daughters.

== Filmography ==
- Idhu Sathiyam (1963)
- Sumaithaangi (1963)
- Kairasikkaran (1984)
- Mahanadhi (1994)
