= Valibar Sangham =

Indian movie

- Directed by: A. N. Kalyanasundaram; R. S. Murthi
- Written by: A. N. Kalyanasundaram
- Screenplay by: A. N. Kalyanasundaram
- Story by: A. N. Kalyanasundaram
- Starring: Mathrimangalam Natesa Iyer; Subhadra; Lakshmanan; Rukmini
- Cinematography: Rajanikanth Pandya
- Music by: A. N. Kalyanasundaram; P. S. Anantharaman
- Production company: Sagar Movietone
- Release date: 24 December 1938
- Country: India
- Language: Tamil

Valibar Sangham (transl. Youth League) is a 1938 Indian Tamil-language film written and directed by A. N. Kalyanasundaram and produced by Sagar Movietone. The film stars Mathrimangalam Natesha Iyer, Subhadra, Lakshmanan, and Rukmini in lead roles. This is also Kumari Kamala's first film.

== Cast ==
List in order of the film's songbook:

- Mathrimangalam Natesa Iyer as Natesan
- Subhadra as Kamala
- Lakshmanan as Sundaram
- Rukmini as Rukmini
- Gopalakrishnan as Gopal
- Ramanujachari as Ramanujam
- Janaki as Seetha
- Kokilam (Chellappa) as Kokilam
- Pruhathambal as Jaya
- Lakshmi as Sakunthala
- Kamala as Leela
- T. K. T. Chari as Chari
- Shripadha Shankar as Shankar
- Vaidyanathan as Vaidhi
- Sadhasivan as Sadhasivan
- Amirthesan as Amirthesan

== Soundtrack ==
The music was composed by A. N. Kalyanasundaram and P. S. Anantharaman. The lyrics were written by A. N. Kalyanasundaram and the songs were recorded by S. C. Patil.

No.	Song	Singer/s
1		Rukmini, Kamala
2		Kokilam (Chellappa)
3		Chorus
4		Subhadra
5		Ramanujachari
6		Gopalakrishnan
7		Lakshmanan
8		Pruhathambal
9		Chorus
10		Pruhathambal
11		Mathrimangalam Natesa Iyer
12		Kokilam (Chellappa)
13		T. K. T. Chari
14		Mathrimangalam Natesa Iyer
15		Subhadra
