= Shobana Vignesh =

Indian Musician and Actress

Mahanadhi Shobana
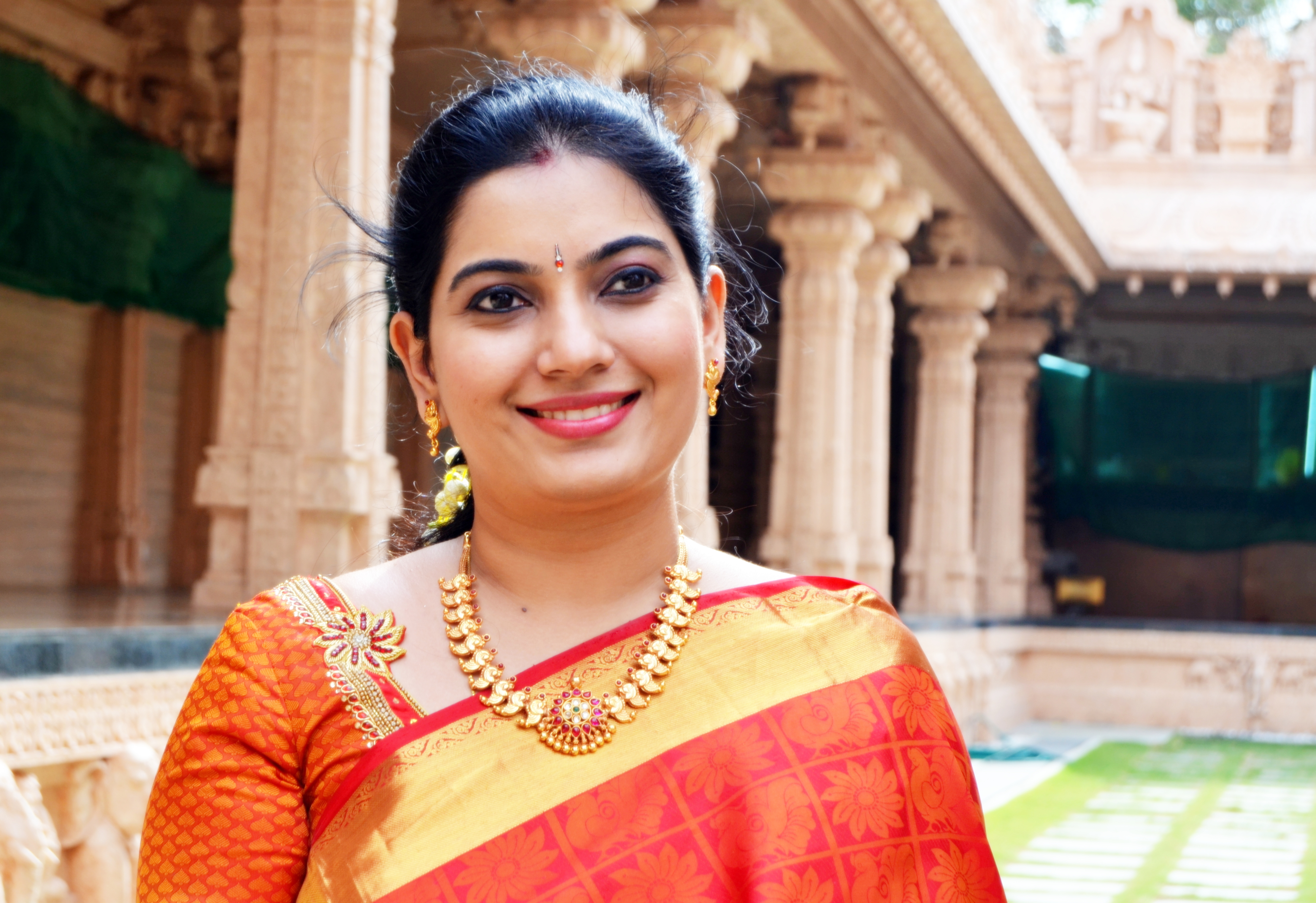

Background information
- Born: Shobana Vignesh; Kumbakonam, Tamil Nadu, India
- Education: PhD in Music
- Genres: Carnatic; Hindustani Music
- Occupation: Indian Classical Vocalist

Shobana Vignesh is an Indian classical and devotional vocalist and a former actor. She is known as 'Mahanadhi' Shobana from her role in the film Mahanadhi.

== Early life ==
Shobhana was born in Kumbakonam in Tamil Nadu to N. Kumar and Revathi Kumar and raised in Chennai. Her maternal family has worked to preserve the Bhagavata Mela tradition in the Village of Tepperumalnallur in Tamil Nadu.

Shobhana attended the Padma Seshadri School in Chennai.

== Carnatic vocalist ==
Shobhana started training in Carnatic music at a very young age. She has been trained by Sri. P.S. Narayanaswamy, Prof. T.R. Subramaniam and Sri. Swamimalai Janakiraman.

Shobhana regularly performs during the Chennai December music season at concerts and on television. She regularly performs at ‘Narada Gana Sabha’, ‘Sri Krishna Gana Sabha’, ‘Sri Thyaga Brahma Gana Sabha’, ‘Bharat Kalachar’, ‘Chennayil Thiruvayaru’, and ‘Margazhi Mahotsavam,’ she makes an annual pilgrimage to Saint Thyaragaraja's Samadhi at Thiruvaiyaru and participates in the Thyagaraja Aradhana festival.

Shobhana has performed throughout India, the United States, Singapore, Malaysia, Dubai, Mauritius and Sri Lanka. She is often featured by leading Television channels in India and other countries and has been performing concerts for the past two decades.

== Education ==
- PhD in Music, Mother Teresa Women's University, India, 2011(Highly Commended Thesis)
- M Phil in Music, Mother Teresa Women's University (Highly Commended Thesis)
- Masters in Music, University of Madras, India
- M.A Mass Communication & Journalism, Alagappa University, India
- B.A Music, University of Madras
- 8th Grade in Theory of Western Classical Music, Trinity College Of Music, London
- 6th Grade in Practical Solo Piano, Trinity College of Music

== Albums ==
Shobhana made her recording debut in ‘Mahanadhi.’ She released her first solo album at age 12 and has since then released more than 150 albums ranging over 1,500 songs by the time she became a teenager.

Shobhana has recorded albums in Tamil, Telugu, Malayalam, Kannada, Sanskrit, Braj, Marathi, Hindi, English and Baduga. She was nominated for the Global Indian Music Awards, Mumbai in 2010 for her album, ‘Shobana Live in Concert – Bharat Kalachar’.

== Playback singer ==
Year	Film	Language	Song	Music director	Co-singer
1994	Mahanadhi	Tamil	Sri Ranga Ranganathanin	Ilaiyaraaja	S. P. Balasubrahmanyam & Uma Ramanan
1994	Mahanadhi	Telugu	Sri Ranga Ranganathanin	Ilaiyaraaja	S. P. Balasubrahmanyam & Uma Ramanan
1995	Nandhavana Theru	Tamil	Ramanaa Sri	Ilaiyaraaja	
1996	Alexander	Tamil	Alexander	Karthik Raja	Bhavatharini, Anupama, Yuvan Shankar Raja & S. P. B. Charan
1996	Alexander	Tamil	Thaathi Thaathi	Karthik Raja	Malaysia Vasudevan & Anupama
1997	Aravindhan	Tamil	Eera Nila	Yuvan Shankar Raja	S. P. Balasubrahmanyam
1997	Punniyavathi	Tamil	Ghandhiyaiyum Paatthathillai	Ilaiyaraaja	
1998	Kannedhirey Thondrinal	Tamil	Chinna Chinna Kiliye	Deva	Hariharan & Anuradha Sriram
1998	Kannedhirey Thondrinal	Tamil	Chinna Chinna Kiliye	Deva	Krishnaraj & Anuradha Sriram
1999	Kanave Kalayadhe	Tamil	Kannodu Kannodu	Deva	P. Unni Krishnan
1999	Ponvizha	Tamil	Konjum Kilikku	Deva	Gangai Amaran
2001	Azhagana Naatkal	Tamil	Adi Devathaiye	Deva	Tippu

== Awards ==
- Received Tamil Nadu Kalaimamani award in August 2019.
- Received ‘ISAI SELVAM’ title from Muthamizh Peravai in May 2015.
- Received 'TAMIL ISAI PEROLI' title from the New York Tamil Sangam in April 2014.
- Received 'ISAI ARASI' title from the Trinity Arts Festival of India in December 2013.
- Received 'TAMIZHISAI VANI' from Greater Atlanta Tamil Sangam in May 2011.
- Received the 'INDIVIDUAL ARTIST AWARD' from the Maryland State Arts Council, USA for 2010.
- Chosen as the 'YOUNG ACHIEVER' in the field of Carnatic music by the India Today magazine in 2007.
- Awarded the 'YUVA KALA BHARATHI' title by Bharat Kalachar in 2003.
- Received the 'YOUNG ACHIEVER OF THE YEAR 2002' award from The Cosmopolitan club of Madras.
- Awarded the fellowship for 'OUTSTANDING YOUNG ARTISTE' by the Department of Culture, Government of India from 2003 to 2005.
- Awarded the title of PANNISAI ARASI by Thamizh Isai Sangam, Thiruvaiyaru in 1997.
- Was conferred the title of EZHIL ISAI VANI by Vani Vilas Sabha, Kumbakonam in 1996.

== Concerts for charity ==
- Fund raising concert for free eye camps conducted by Arvind Eye Hospital, India,
- Concerts for the Tamil Nadu Foundation across the United States.
- Fund raising concert for the EWRF (Educational, Welfare and Research Foundation) as part of the No Student Left behind campaign (NSLB), Malaysia.
- Performance for the relief of Tsunami victims at Chennai, India.
- Concert at the Music Academy for the Cancer Institute, Chennai.
- Performance for an AIDS Awareness album
- Charity concert at Malaysia for the welfare of spastic children and many such events.
- Songs for raising knowledge of legal rights, women's rights and government legal help. She was honored for these services by the State Legal Services Authority on Indian Independence day 2003.
