= Kamala Laxman =

Indian author

- Born: 1924 or 1925; Chennai, Tamil Nadu, India
- Died: 14 November 2015; Pune, Maharashtra, India
- Occupation: author
- Spouse: R. K. Laxman

Kamala Laxman was an Indian author of children's books, and the wife of cartoonist R. K. Laxman.

== Early life and career ==
Laxman was born in Chennai and studied at St Thomas' Convent, and later graduated from Indraprastha College for Women, Delhi. She also received a degree in Interior Decoration from Sir J.J. School of Art in Mumbai.

The India Book House commissioned Laxman to write children's books in the 1970s. Her notable works include The Thama Stories, Raman of Tenali & Other Stories and Thama and His Missing Mother. Many of her works were illustrated by her husband, the cartoonist R. K. Laxman. Her stories were serialised and telecast by the Indian TV station Doordarshan.

== Personal life ==
Laxman was the life president of Mahalakshmi Ladies' Club founded by her mother in 1965 in Mumbai.

She was married to cartoonist R. K. Laxman, who was also her maternal uncle, after his divorce from his first wife, the dancer and actress Kumari Kamala. Laxman died in 2015 at the age of 90. She was survived by her son, Srinivas, a retired journalist, a daughter-in-law, Usha and a granddaughter, Rimanika.
