= Wagle Ki Duniya =

Indian sitcom television series (1988)

- Promotional poster
- Genre: Sitcom
- Created by: R. K. Laxman
- Directed by: Kundan Shah
- Starring: Anjan Srivastav; Bharati Achrekar
- Composer: Vanraj Bhatia
- Country of origin: India
- Original language: Hindi
- No. of episodes: 13

Production
- Producer: Ravi Ojha
- Camera setup: Single camera
- Running time: 45 minutes

Original release
- Network: DD National
- Release: 1988 – 1990

Related
- Wagle Ki Nayi Duniya; Detective Wagle; Wagle Ki Duniya - Nayi Peedhi Naye Kissey

Wagle Ki Duniya (transl. Wagle's World) is an Indian sitcom that aired on DD National from 1988 to 1990. It was produced by Durga Khote, directed by Kundan Shah, and was based on characters created by noted cartoonist, R. K. Laxman, especially "the common man" about the issues of common middle-class Indian man. It starred Anjan Srivastav as a bumbling sales clerk in a multinational and Bharati Achrekar as his wife.

== Overview ==
The series was set around the everyday struggles, of the nervous sales clerk, Srinivas Wagle, who lived with the prudence of a middle-class person of the time.

== Cast ==
- Anjan Srivastav as Srinivas Wagle-A sales clerk, Radhika's husband, Manoj and Rajesh's father
- Bharati Achrekar as Radhika Wagle-Srinivas's wife, Manoj and Rajesh's mother
- Dicky Nagpal as Manoj Wagle. Srinivas Wagle and Radhika's elder son, Raju's elder brother
- Jeetendra Dasadiya as Rajesh Wagle a.k.a. Raju. Srinivas Wagle and Radhika's younger son, Manoj's younger brother
- Harish Magon as Bhalla
- Virendra Saxena as Gadkari
- Narendra Gupta as Inspector Tyagi
- Shah Rukh Khan as Careless Driver in Episode 11
- Arpit Singhai as Priyanka Singhai Husband
- Deepak Qazir Kejriwal as Verma, Licence officer
- Achyut Potdar as Licence officer
- Harish Patel
- Mushtaq Khan as Manohar
- Nandita Thakur
- Sankalp Dubey

== Production ==
The weekly series was conceived by R.K. Laxman, and he himself narrated the script. It was based on RK Laxman character about quintessential common man.

The original run was supposed to be of six episodes, but seeing the response, it ran up to 13 episodes. The series achieved a cult status, and made Anjan Srivastav a household name. Film actor, Shahrukh Khan made a guest appearance in the series before he did Fauji (1988).

== Sequel ==
A sequel series Wagle Ki Nayi Duniya (transl. Wagle's New World) aired on StarPlus in 1999.

In 2012, the character Wagle was brought back with new series by same team, Detective Wagle on DD National in November 2012, where Anjan Srivastav reprised his role as Wagle, while the role of his wife was played by Sulabha Arya.

Wagle Ki Duniya – Nayi Peedhi Naye Kissey (Wagle's World - New Generation, New Stories), a sequel series started airing on Sony SAB from 8 February 2021. The show focuses on Srinivas' younger son Rajesh Wagle, his family and his neighbors. Both Anjan Srivastav and Bharti Achrekar reprised their roles.

== See also ==
- List of programs broadcast by DD National
- List of programs broadcast by Sony SAB
