= Mahanadhi (1994 film) =

1994 film by Santhana Bharathi

- Theatrical release poster
- Directed by: Santhana Bharathi
- Screenplay by: Kamal Haasan; Ra. Ki. Rangarajan
- Story by: Kamal Haasan
- Produced by: S. A. Rajkannu
- Starring: Kamal Haasan; Sukanya
- Cinematography: M. S. Prabhu
- Edited by: N. P. Satish
- Music by: Ilaiyaraaja
- Production company: Sree Amman Creations
- Release date: 14 January 1994
- Running time: 165 minutes
- Country: India
- Language: Tamil
- Budget: ₹2.5 crores

Mahanadhi (/ˈməhɑːˌnəði/ transl. The Great River) is a 1994 Indian Tamil-language crime drama film directed by Santhana Bharathi and co-written by Kamal Haasan. The film stars Haasan and Sukanya, with S. N. Lakshmi, Tulasi, Shobana Vignesh, Dinesh, Poornam Viswanathan, Rajesh and V. M. C. Haneefa in supporting roles. It revolves around a widower and his family going through many miseries due to the machinations of a con artist.

The idea for Mahanadhi originated when Haasan discovered his domestic help's plan to kidnap his daughters for a ransom. After he completed the story, novelist Ra. Ki. Rangarajan provided inputs, and was subsequently credited as the dialogue writer. Cinematography was handled by newcomer M. S. Prabhu, and editing was handled by N. P. Sathish. It was the first film in India to make use of Avid Technology. The film deals with several issues, such as corruption and child trafficking.

Mahanadhi was released in theatres on 14 January 1994, Pongal day, and was both critically and commercially successful. The film won two National Film Awards: Best Tamil Feature Film and Best Audiography, and two Tamil Nadu State Film Awards: Special Prize (Best Film) and Best Stunt Coordinator (Vikram Dharma).

== Plot ==
Krishnaswamy is a widower living peacefully with his mother-in-law Saraswathi Ammal, daughter Kaveri and son Bharani in a village near Kumbakonam. He meets Dhanush, a con artist from Madras, who lusts after Krishna's prosperity and asks him to join his chit fund business. Krishna is initially reluctant; however, when a wealthy friend from abroad visits his house, Krishna too wants to be well off like them for his family. He agrees to Dhanush's proposal and arrives in Madras. When Dhanush swindles him out of the money, Krishna is implicated and wrongfully convicted.

Krishna befriends Panjapakesan who is in prison for the same reason. He advises Krishna not to be angry if the jailer is cruel to them, as he might be released sooner on good behaviour. Panjapakesan's daughter is a nurse, and during Krishna's time in jail she takes care of his family. Due to unavoidable situations, Saraswathi dies, and after being released from prison, Krishna learns that his children have gone missing.

On a walk with Panjapakesan, Krishna finds Bharani working with a family of street performers and brings him home. Bharani lets him know that Kaveri must still be with Dhanush, as he got her a job. Krishna later learns that his daughter was sent to Calcutta and is working in Sonagachi, a red-light district.

Around the time Krishna was arrested, Kaveri had attained puberty, and three months later, Saraswathi became sick. Kaveri and Bharani go to Dhanush asking for financial help. Dhanush takes them to his boss so that Kaveri is sold into prostitution. Though the boss provides money to Dhanush for Saraswathi's treatment, he chases out Bharani with his dog and keeps the money for himself. Kaveri was raped by the boss and was trafficked, ending up in Sonagachi.

Krishna goes to Calcutta with his father-in-law and tracks down his daughter. Unable to bear the grief, he grabs her and tries to escape, while the pimps and the other prostitutes there beat him severely. The brothel madam makes a truce and insists that Krishna takes Kaveri away, while the prostitutes would work extra hours to pay the pimps for the loss of Kaveri.

After returning from Calcutta, Krishna wants to start a new life with Yamuna, but his friend in the police, Muthusamy tells him that Dhanush has planned to implicate Krishna in a murder case, and he will be arrested the next day. Also, Krishna overhears his daughter sleep-talking about all the clients she was made to work for. Heartbroken, Krishna decides to curb the root of his grief and goes to seek revenge against Dhanush.

Krishna learns that Dhanush is just a pawn in the big game of cheating. He not only kills Dhanush but also Venkatachalam, the main person behind this game, at the cost of his left arm. Krishna is sentenced to 14 years of imprisonment and comes out a content man, to see his daughter married to Muthusamy's son and with a baby, and his son a grown man. The whole family moves back to their native village.

== Cast ==
- Kamal Haasan as Krishnaswamy
- Sukanya as Yamuna
- Shobana Vignesh as Young Kaveri
- S. N. Lakshmi as Saraswathi Ammal
- Tulasi as Manju
- Dinesh as Bharani
- Poornam Viswanathan as Panjabikesan
- Rajesh as Muthusamy
- Cochin Haneefa as Dhanush
- Mohan Natarajan as Venkatachalam
- Vijay as Mannangkatti
- Mohan Raman as Lawyer
- Sivasankar as Thulukaanam

The uncredited cast includes Sangita as adolescent Kaveri and Jayasudha as Narmada, Krishnaswamy's late wife in a portrait.

== Production ==
=== Development ===
According to Kamal Haasan, his domestic help plotted to kidnap his daughters for a ransom, but he discovered their plan. This incident laid the foundation for Mahanadhi. Haasan has stated that when he started to write the script, "the script wrote itself ....maybe assisted by my fear, apprehension and paranoia." He avoided publicising this fact for over twenty years. According to director Santhana Bharathi, when Haasan was asked to do a film for S. A. Rajkannu of Sree Amman Creations, he immediately involved Bharathi in the project and told him the story needed to be ready. Haasan and Bharathi went to Kodaikanal where they completed the story after much toiling. After the duo returned to Madras, novelist Ra. Ki. Rangarajan made further suggestions which were used; he was subsequently credited as the film's dialogue writer.

Haasan initially considered titling the film Meenda Sorgam (previously the title of a 1960 film), but ultimately desisted as it was found to be old-fashioned; Mahanadhi was later finalised as the team wanted a title related to rivers, with many of the characters being named after rivers. P. C. Sreeram was initially approached to be the cinematographer, but he declined and instead suggested his assistant M. S. Prabhu. The film was Prabhu's first as an independent cinematographer while the fight sequences were choreographed by Vikram Dharma. Haasan's then-wife Sarika designed the costumes and was also an audiographer, while editing was handled by N. P. Sathish. Cheran, who worked as an associate director, later accused Haasan of mistreating him and other assistant directors during production.

=== Casting and filming ===
The film marked the acting debut of Shobana (who did not act in any other film since then), Dinesh and Sivasankar, who all got the film's title added to their names as a prefix. The makers wanted a girl who could sing well, and cast Shobana as Kaveri after discovering her at a school event. Sivasankar, who became known as "Mahanadhi" Shankar, was cast as the prison warden Thulukaanam as the makers wanted someone who could perform stunts as well as act. He was already a stuntman and was recommended to Bharathi by Dharma. Shankar, who weighed 66 kilograms (146 lb), was asked by Dharma to gain weight for the role, and pushed it to 82 kilograms (181 lb) within three months. V. M. C. Haneefa readily agreed to act in the film as Dhanush when approached; he had previously been considered for an antagonistic role in Bharathi's Gunaa (1991). The sex workers in Sonagachi were not portrayed by real sex workers, but extras. The woman reuniting Krishnaswamy with his daughter was played by a bank officer then associated with the Tamil Sangam theatre troupe.

Principal photography was to have begun in May 1993 but began only in September due to casting difficulties; Bharathi said the makers "had to reach for three boys belonging to different age groups and son resembling Kamal [Haasan] and three girls likewise to play Kamal's daughters". The prison scenes were shot on a set designed by art director G. K., and some of the vessels used for those scenes were borrowed from real prisons. The pre-interval scene where Krishnaswamy stands victoriously in prison as the saviour of people has been dubbed the "Jesus Christ" shot due to the way the light falls on Krishnaswamy. Mahanadhi was the first film in India to make use of Avid Technology, and was one of the first digitally edited films outside of the United States.

== Themes ==
Mahanadhi deals with several issues such as corruption and child trafficking. Baradwaj Rangan said, "Mahanadhi is one of the saddest films ever made, grim north to Singin' in the Rain's blithe south, but it has an extraordinary musical moment in 'Peygala nambaadhey', which Kamal Haasan's character sings, during a power cut, to his children who are scared of the dark". He described the song as "(a) a father's moral instruction to his children ("face your fears"), (b) a bit of levity, (c) a sweet stretch showcasing this family's dynamics, and (d) a hint that bad things can come at you from everywhere, whether from the television set (featuring terrifyingly distorted musical performers) or even a doting grandmother (who, jokingly, fashions herself into a demon goddess). That's where the film is headed, into a zone where nothing and no one can be trusted, and this song shapes these themes in a casually understated manner".

Poet Puviarasu stated: "Don't go after the mystic deer, was Kamal's message in the movie Mahanadhi [...] In the film, Krishna relocates to the city to earn more money, own a Benz and educate his daughter at Church Park Convent. And he faces the consequences of his actions." The film also symbolically references the Kaveri River water dispute, and many of the characters are named after major Indian rivers like Krishna (Krishnaswamy), Yamuna, Kaveri, and Thamirabarani (Bharani). Haasan has stated that the central message of Mahanadhi is that "urbanisation is not necessarily development". He also said the film was influenced by Les Misérables, an 1862 novel by Victor Hugo. The core plot was also reported to bear resemblance with the 1979 film Hardcore.

== Soundtrack ==
The music was composed by Ilaiyaraaja, and lyrics were written by Vaali. Shobana sang the song "Sri Ranga Ranganathanin", which is set in Hamsadhvani raga. The song "Pongalo Pongal" became one of the most popular Pongal themed songs of Tamil cinema and is played in radio and television on every Pongal.

Track listing
No.	Title	Lyrics	Singer(s)	Length
1.	"Anbana Thayai"	Vaali	S. P. Balasubrahmanyam
2.	"Engeyo Thikkudesai"	Vaali	Kamal Haasan
3.	"Peigala Bhoodhama"	Vaali	Kamal Haasan, Shanmugasundari
4.	"Pongalo Pongal"	Vaali	K. S. Chithra
5.	"Solladha Raagangal"	Vaali	S. P. Balasubrahmanyam, S. Janaki
6.	"Sri Ranga Ranganathanin"	Vaali	S. P. Balasubrahmanyam, Uma Ramanan, Shobana Vignesh
7.	"Thanmanam Ulla Nenjum"	Vaali	Kamal Haasan
8.	"Pirar Vaada" (Poem)	Subramania Bharati	Kamal Haasan

== Release ==
Mahanadi was released in theatres on 14 January 1994, Pongal day. Despite clashing against other Pongal releases such as Sethupathi IPS, Amaidhipadai, Rajakumaran, Veetla Visheshanga, Siragadikka Aasai and Sindhu Nathi Poo, it became a box office success. In September 2020, Rajesh, who played a supporting role in the film, told Nakkheeran that the successful box office run and profits made by Mahanadhi helped Rajkannu clear all his earlier debts and it was he who requested Haasan to make the film for Rajkannu. The film was screened at the International Film Festival Rotterdam six years after its release.

=== Critical reception ===
Malini Mannath of The Indian Express wrote, "Mahanadhi is a melancholic film with scenes that linger long after the film is over." K. Vijiyan of New Straits Times wrote, "This movie is quite long [...] and I was warned the story was a bit "slow" but I did not really feel the time passing. If you like Kamal, you will like Mahanadhi, which should earn another acting award for him". The Tamil magazine Ananda Vikatan wrote that it is surprising to see such a soft, intense and different film in Tamil, and also praised Haasan's acting, stating that one will forget Haasan and see only the character Krishnaswamy and empathise with him. R. P. R. of Kalki wrote that, despite the presence of many actors performing well, Haasan was able to outshine them, and also appreciated the cinematography and music.

=== Accolades ===
Event	Category	Recipient(s)	Ref.
41st National Film Awards	Best Tamil Feature Film	S. A. Rajkannu	
41st National Film Awards	Best Audiography	H. Sridhar, K. M. Surya Narayan	
Tamil Nadu State Film Awards	Special Prize (Best Film)	S. A. Rajkannu	
Tamil Nadu State Film Awards	Best Stunt Coordinator	Vikram Dharma	

== Legacy ==
Mahanadhi has often been cited as one of the saddest and most depressing films from Tamil cinema. Following the film's release, many people mimicked Poornam Viswanathan's style of dialogue delivery in the film. On the centenary of Indian cinema in April 2013, Forbes India included Haasan's performance in the film on its list, "25 Greatest Acting Performances of Indian Cinema".

== Bibliography ==
- Dhananjayan, G. (2014). Pride of Tamil Cinema: 1931–2013. Blue Ocean Publishers. OCLC 898765509.
