= R. K. Laxman Ki Duniya =

Indian comedy TV show

- Genre: Comedy
- Written by: Sachin Mote
- Directed by: Dharmesh Mehta
- Country of origin: India
- Original language: Hindi
- No. of episodes: 353

Production
- Producer: Jamnadas Majethia
- Camera setup: 576i
- Running time: 24 minutes
- Production company: Hats Off Productions

Original release
- Network: SAB TV
- Release: 28 November 2011 – 29 March 2013

R. K. Laxman Ki Duniya is an Indian comedy TV show on SAB TV. It was based on the cartoons of R. K. Laxman. The show revolved around the life of a common man, his joys and sorrows.

== Plot ==
This TV series was based on the books and works of R. K. Laxman. The episodes and incidents would involve happenings in the life of The Common Man as depicted by Laxman over the years.

The show focused on the character of Common Man who is a silent spectator of marching time. Common Man, confronts India's latest heartbreak with a kind of wry resignation. Meek and silent, he's a witness to everything: scheming politicians, gossiping housewives and rapacious bureaucrats. This character has been hugely successful because it represents Indians.

== Cast and characters ==
- Atul Parchure as Bhavesh Krishnakant Vasavda, son of Krishnakant and the older brother of Piyush and the male protagonist of the serial. He works as an accountant and just earns enough to support his family. He has a very good relationship with his wife Bakula. He has two daughters Asha and Lata. He always tells everybody, "Be Positive".
- Vandana Pathak as Bakula Bhavesh Vasavda a.k.a. Baku or Bakudi, wife of Bhavesh and female protagonist of the serial. She admires her husband a lot and always says "Bhavesh Matlab Bhavesh" to show her admiration. She thinks Ambika, Piyush and Guni as her own children. She always wants to share things with her neighbours.
- Deepak Gheewala as Krishnakant Vasavda a.k.a. Pappa, father of Bhavesh, Ambika and Piyush. He is a retired teacher and a man full of values. He always stands with Bhavesh and is a source of inspiration for him. He keeps his daughters-in-law as his own daughters. His wife Saraswati Krishnakant Vasavda is deceased. He is respected by everyone in the colony.
- Krishna Bharadwaj as Piyush Krishnakant Vasavda a.k.a. Nanka, Piyush Bro, Partner, younger brother of Bhavesh. He is an estate agent and finds new ways to earn money. He does not have any fixed income and depends on Bhavesh. He treats Bhavesh and Bakula as his parents. He is married to Gun Sundri.
- Shruti Rawat as Gun Sundri Piyush Vasavda a.k.a. Guni, wife of Piyush. She hails from a rich family and does not know to do household work. She always praises her father in everything. She respects Bhavesh a lot and treats Bakula as her elder sister. She also keeps care of Asha, Lata as her own daughters.
- Afsha Musani as Asha Bhavesh Vasavda, younger daughter of Bhavesh and Bakula. She is very cute and wears spectacles. She is very smart and intelligent. She is loved by everyone in the family.
- Nupur Bhatt as Lata Bhavesh Vasavda, elder daughter of Bhavesh and Bakula. She is little fat and often gets scared. She is not too good in studies. Bhavesh always motivates and helps her.
- Sameer Shah as Bakulesh Bakulbhai Anjaria a.k.a. Bakuda, brother of Bakula. He hails from Bhavnagar and wants to go to New Jersey. He always speaks English words as per their spellings and not pronunciation. He has an innocent crush on Pooja and always gets in fight with Mamuti, who also likes Pooja.
- Vanleela a.k.a. Motiben, Faiba, elder sister of Krishnakant Vasavda. She adores Bakula, but is also very strict. She always scolds Guni for not doing household work and also scolds Bakulesh for not earning money. She hails from Bhavnagar.
- Sonal Vengurlekar as various characters.
- Hemlai Joshi as Ambika a.k.a. Ambu, sister of Bhavesh. She is younger sister of Bhavesh who is fat and doesn't look beautiful. She always speaks negative. She was unmarried but, now is married to Pawan Kumar.
- Pawan Kumar, husband of Ambika. He is married to Ambika, younger sister of Bhavesh. He is very thin and cannot hold heavy things. He can easily get flown away in wind. Ambika has to take care of him.
- DVD Pillai a.k.a. Swami, Sister Ka Mr., neighbour and friend of Bhavesh. He is a construction supervisor in a big company. He always dreams of being the richest man of his state, Tamil Nadu. He is scared of his wife Rajni and doesn't like her worship to Rajnikant. He hates his brother-in-law Mamutti as he always creates problems between him and his wife. He is best friend of Bhavesh and Ramesh.
- Gulfam Khan as Rajni DVD Pillai a.k.a. Rajni Amma, Akka, wife of DVD. She is a staunch devotee of Rajnikant and worships him. She loves his brother a lot and always takes his side. She makes her husband scared of her and forces him to fulfill her wishes. She is best friends of Bakula and Neena.
- Sanjay Wadekar as Mamooty a.k.a. Tindoru, Cutypie, brother of Rajni. He is brother-in-law of DVD who sells idli-dosa. He is of short stature and is unmarried. He doesn't like DVD and always fights with him. He is a good friend of Piyush and Bakulesh. He likes Pooja and fights with Bakulesh who, also likes Pooja.
- Vinay Yedekar as Ramesh Dhondu Apte, neighbour and friend of Bhavesh. He works in a company and earns good. He calls himself by name and tries to show everyone that he is great and knows everything. He doesn't like cricket and thinks it as a waste of time. He is best friend of Bhavesh and DVD.It is later revealed that he was a great club cricketer and would easily have found place in the Indian cricket team, had it not been for his greedy manager who edged him out of the team as a part of match-fixing to earn quick money.
- Radhika Vidyasagar as Neena Ramesh Apte, wife of Ramesh. She is a simple housewife who always does whoever says to her. She always runs behind her son Sachin. She has a habit of speaking wrong things. She is a good friend of Bakula and Rajni.
- Naina Apte as Kaveri Dhondueen Apte a.k.a. Aaji, mother of Ramesh. She is a big fan of cricket and speaks in the language of cricket. She also made her grandson Sachin play cricket. She thinks that women have equal rights with men. She is the leader of all ladies in the colony.
- Hardik Sargam as Sachin Ramesh Apte, son of Ramesh and Neena. He is a student who is very smart, handsome and dashing. Like her grandmother, he is also a big fan of cricket. He always gets in fight with his father who doesn't like cricket. His mother loves him a lot and takes much care of him. At the starting when he came from camp the other Sachin was changed.
- Harpreet Chhabra as Pooja Chopra, neighbour of Bhavesh. She is an air-hostess who lives on rent in a flat in their colony. She is very beautiful and sweet. She calls Mamuti as Cutipie. Mamuti and Bakulesh both, like her and try to impress her. Now soon, her parents will also shift to the colony. Their luggage has already arrived in the colony.
- Nimesh Soni as Sharma a.k.a. Paanwala, colleague of Bhavesh. He always chews Paan in his mouth and talks about his "Majhla Sadu". He is a late comer and slacks off all the time. For this, he always gets scolding from his boss.
- Firdaus Mewawala as Jhunjhunwala a.k.a. Boss, Bhavesh's boss. He is an old-aged man who is very jolly and also strict. He treats Bhavesh and Baku as his children. He always scolds Sharma for his carelessness.
- Akhil Mishra Cameo as a Guest who rhymes all he says February 2012
- Saanand Verma as police officer who is known for his honesty
