= R. K. Laxman =

Indian Cartoonist

R.K. Laxman
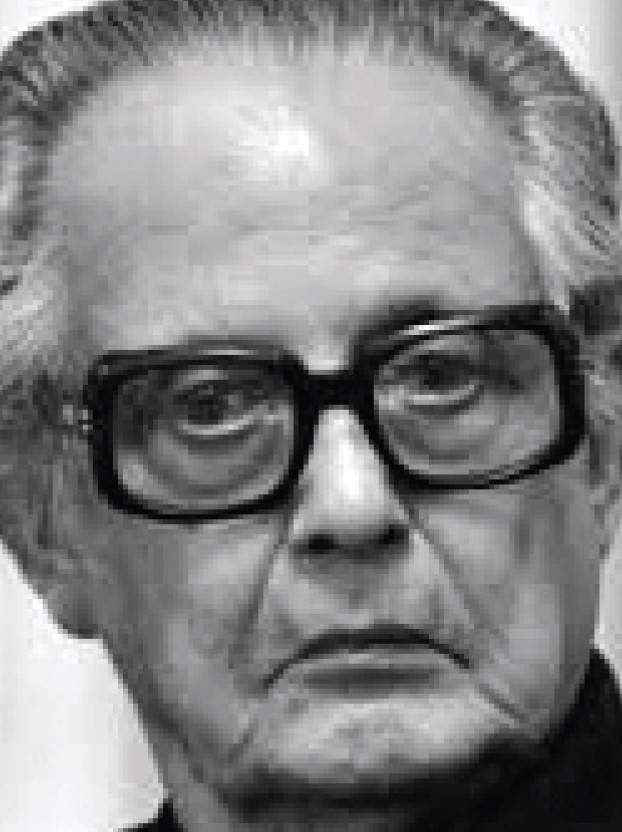
- Born: Rasipuram Krishnaswami Laxman; 24 October 1921; Mysore, Kingdom of Mysore, British India (present-day Mysuru, Karnataka, India)
- Died: 26 January 2015 (aged 93); Pune, Maharashtra, India
- Occupations: Cartoonist, illustrator
- Known for: Common Man
- Spouses: Kumari Kamala (div. 1960): Kamala Laxman
- Relatives: R. K. Narayan (brother)
- Awards: Padma Vibhushan; Padma Bhushan; Ramon Magsaysay Award
- Website: http://rklaxman.com/

Rasipuram Krishnaswami Laxman (24 October 1921 – 26 January 2015) was an Indian cartoonist, illustrator, and humorist. He was best known for his creation The Common Man and for his daily cartoon strip, You Said It in The Times of India, which started in 1951.

R. K. Laxman started his career as a part-time cartoonist, working mostly for local newspapers and magazines. As a college student, he had illustrated his older brother R. K. Narayan's stories in The Hindu. His first full-time job was as a political cartoonist for The Free Press Journal in Mumbai. Later, he joined The Times of India, and became famous for The Common Man character, which became the turning point in Laxman's life.

== Birth and childhood ==
R. K. Laxman was born in Mysore in 1921 in a Tamil Hindu family. His father was a headmaster and Laxman was the youngest of eight children: six sons and two daughters. His elder brother was novelist R.K. Narayan.

An ill-mannered student in school, he was often punished by his teachers for misbehaving. In his words, “I felt wretched in the classroom. I am convinced that school-learning is unnatural and bad for human beings.” His academic performance was poor, and it was in this time that his inclination to art blossomed.

Laxman was fascinated by the illustrations in magazines such as The Strand, Punch, Bystander, Wide World and Tit-Bits, before he had even begun to read. Soon, at three years old, he was drawing on his own, on the floors, walls and doors of his house and doodling caricatures of his teachers at school; praised by a teacher for his drawing of a peepal leaf, he began to think of himself as an artist in the making. Laxman notes in his autobiography, The Tunnel of Time:

I drew objects that caught my eye outside the window of my room – the dry twigs, leaves and lizard-like creatures crawling about, the servant chopping firewood and, of course, and number of crows in various postures on the rooftops of the buildings opposite.

— R. K. Laxman

At age nine, Laxman decided to be an artist. He would cycle around Mysore and observe the nature around him while looking for something to paint. Eventually, he found and studied illustrations in foreign magazines, and was influenced by other artists like Sir David Low (whose signature he misread as “cow” for a long time), a British cartoonist who appeared now and then in The Hindu. He then began to illustrate cartoons satirizing international names like Winston Churchill, Adolf Hitler, and Mahatma Gandhi, and found local papers that were willing to publish them.

Laxman was the captain of his local "Rough and Tough and Jolly" cricket team and his antics inspired the stories "Dodu the Money Maker" and "The Regal Cricket Club" written by his brother, Narayan. Laxman's idyllic childhood was shaken for a while when his father suffered a paralytic stroke and died around a year later, but the elders at home bore most of the increased responsibility, while Laxman continued with his schooling.

After high school at Maharaja's Govt. High School, Mysore, Laxman applied to the Sir J.J. Institute of Applied Art hoping to concentrate on his lifelong interests of drawing and painting, but the dean of the school wrote to him that his drawings lacked "the kind of talent to qualify for enrolment in our institution as a student", and refused admission. He finally graduated with a Bachelor of Arts from the University of Mysore. In the meantime he continued his freelance artistic activities and contributed cartoons to Swarajya and an animated film based on the mythological character Narada.

== Career ==
=== Beginning ===
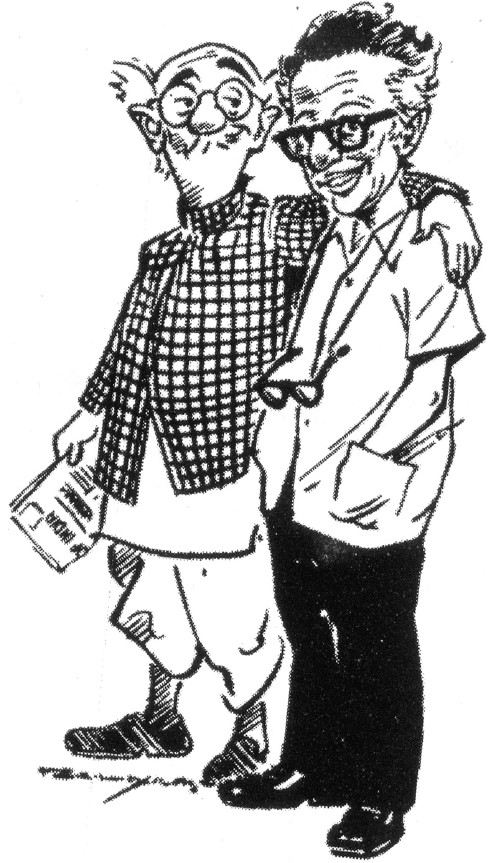
R. K. Laxman with his creation, The Common Man

R.K Laxman's earliest work was for newspapers and magazines including Swarajya and Blitz. While still at the Maharaja College of Mysore, he began to illustrate his elder brother R. K. Narayan's stories in The Hindu, and he drew political cartoons for the local newspapers and for the Swatantra magazine. Laxman also drew cartoons for the Kannada humour magazine, Koravanji which was founded in 1942 by M. Shivaram, who had a clinic in the Majestic area of Bangalore. He started this monthly magazine, dedicating it to humorous and satirical articles and cartoons. Shivaram himself was an eminent humourist in Kannada. He encouraged Laxman. Laxman held a summer job at the Gemini Studios, Madras. His first full-time job was as a political cartoonist for The Free Press Journal in Mumbai, where Bal Thackeray was his cartoonist colleague. In 1951, Laxman joined The Times of India, Mumbai, beginning a career that spanned over fifty years. His "Common Man" character, featured in his pocket cartoons, is portrayed as a witness to the making of democracy. Anthropologist Ritu G. Khanduri notes, "R. K. Laxman structures his cartoon-news through a plot about corruption and a set of characters. This news is visualized and circulates through the recurring figures of the mantri (minister), the Common Man and the trope of modernity symbolized by the airplane (2012: 304)."

=== Other creations ===
Laxman also created a popular mascot for the Asian Paints Ltd group called "Gattu" in 1954. He also wrote a few novels, the first one of which was titled The Hotel Riviera. His cartoons have appeared in Hindi films such as Mr. & Mrs. '55 and a Tamil film Kamaraj. His creations also include the sketches drawn for the television adaptation of Malgudi Days which was written by his elder brother R. K. Narayan, directed by Shankar Nag, and a Konkan coast based Hindi sitcom, Wagle Ki Duniya. Laxman also drew caricatures of David Low, T. S. Eliot, Dr. Rajkumar, Bertrand Russell, J. B. Priestley and Graham Greene.

== Personal life ==
Laxman was first married to Kumari Kamala, a Bharatanatyam dancer and film actress who began her film career as a child actress named "Baby Kamala" and graduated into adult roles under the name "Kumari Kamala" ("Miss Kamala"). They had no children and after their divorce in 1960 Laxman married his niece whose first name was again Kamala. She was the author and children's author, Kamala Laxman. In a cartoon series named "The star I never met" in film magazine Filmfare he painted a cartoon of Kamala Laxman, with the title "The star I only met!" The couple's son Srinivas Laxman is a Mumbai-based freelance space journalist who has contributed regularly to The Times of India.

In September 2003, Laxman suffered a stroke that left him paralysed on his left side. He recovered from it partially. On the evening of 20 June 2010, Laxman was admitted to Breach Candy Hospital in Mumbai after being transported by an air ambulance from Pune.

== Death ==
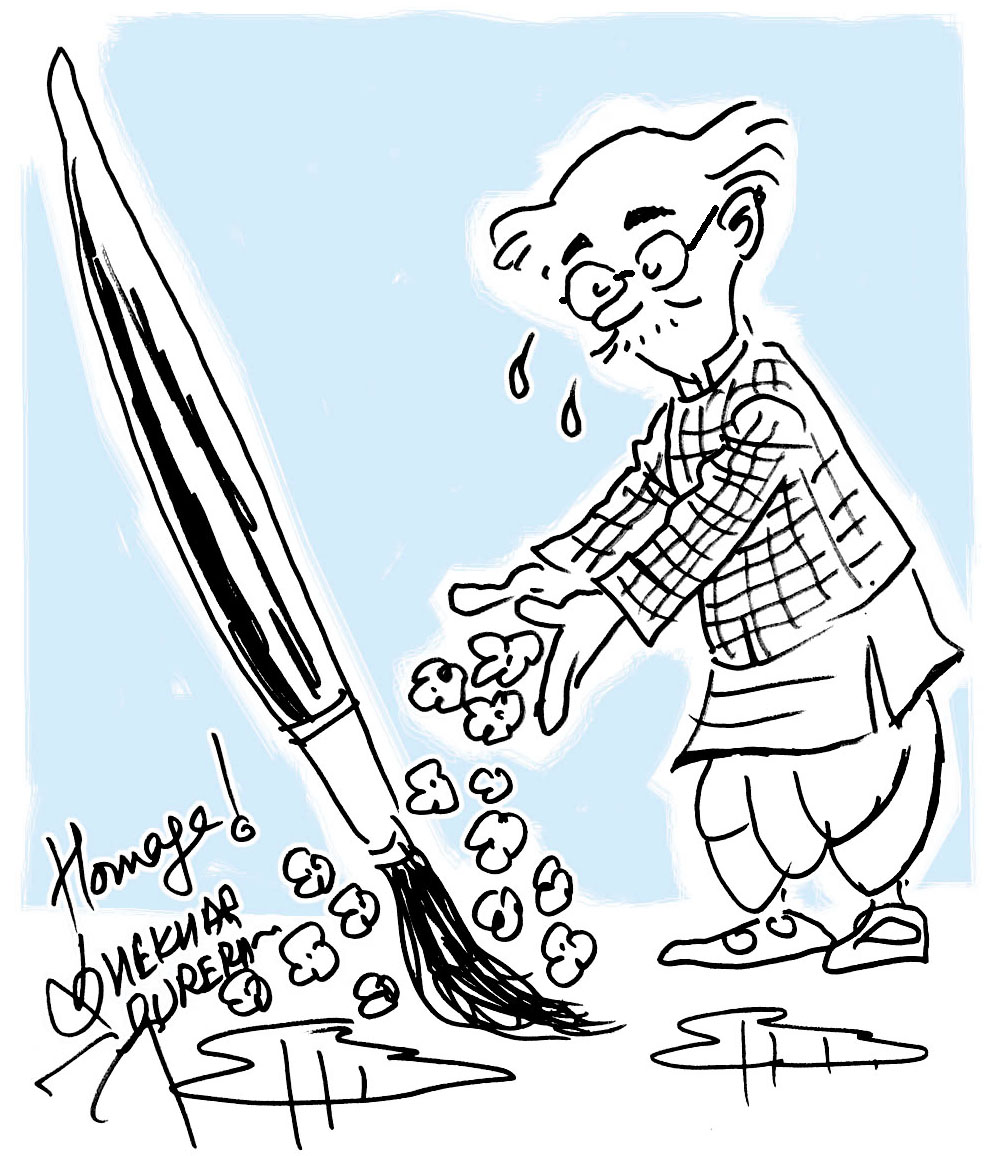
A tribute to the late R. K. Laxman by cartoonist Shekhar Gurera

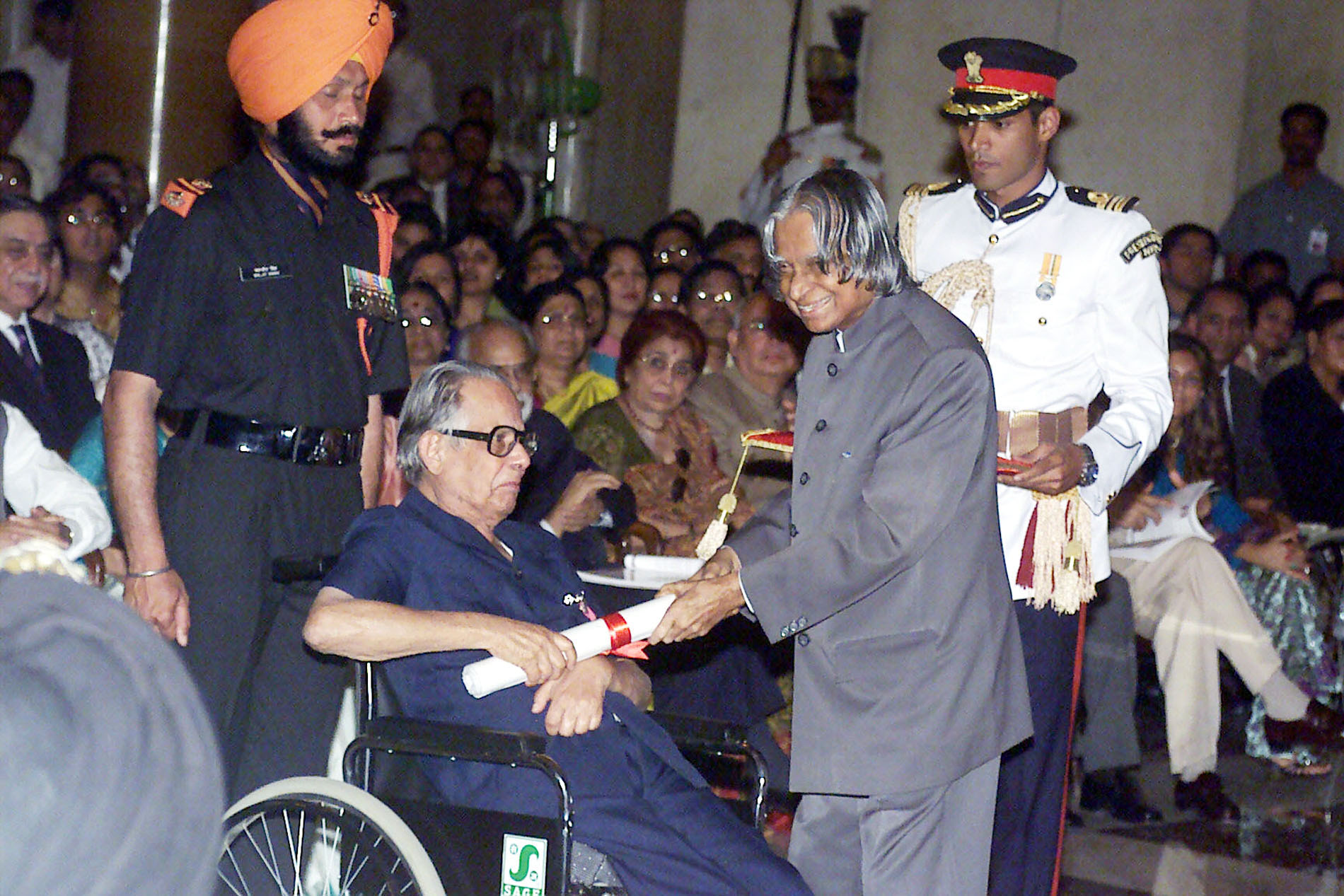
R. K. Laxman receives the Padma Vibhushan award from the President Dr. A.P.J. Abdul Kalam in New Delhi on March 28, 2005

Laxman died in Deenanath Mangeshkar Hospital in Pune on India's Republic Day in 2015 at the age of 93. He was hospitalised three days earlier for a urinary tract infection and chest problems that ultimately led to multiple organ failure. He had reportedly suffered multiple strokes since 2010. A cartoon that Laxman had made following the successful landing of Mangalyaan on Mars was posted by the Indian Space Research Organisation on its Facebook and Twitter pages on 27 January. Maharashtra Chief Minister Devendra Fadnavis announced that Laxman would be accorded a state funeral and a memorial would be built in his honour. Laxman's body was kept at the Symbiosis Institute's Pune premises near the "Common Man" statue and was cremated at the Vaikunth crematorium.

== Literary style ==
According to Sushmita Chatterjee, author and professor of Gender Studies at Colorado State, R.K. Laxman’s cartoons provide a sharp satirical lens on Indian democracy, capturing its shortcomings, its strengths, and its contradictions. Thus the iconic Common Man figure was born, serving as both a silent observer and a symbolic representation of the Indian public, witnessing political absurdities and everyday struggles. According to Lee Spiegel– professor and author of Laughing Matters: Comic Traditions in India– Laxman’s style is deeply rooted in the discipline of classical draftsmanship and follows a controlled approach to caricature—never veering into grotesque exaggeration but instead refining details to accentuate character traits. Unlike the high-energy, exaggerated contortions found in Western political cartoons, his caricatures are not chaotic distortions but rather calculated refinements, where every detail– whether in the weary slouch of a bureaucrat or the self-satisfied smirk of a politician– serves an expressive function. Laxman exposes the gap between political promises and reality while still employing humor to highlight institutional flaws and possibilities, never trivializing them.

The cartoons also have a performative dimension, wherein the audience can see democracy’s shortcomings unfold in real time rather than inciting a call for action. To some, this approach to cartoons is ineffective; for instance, Ravi Shankar, also a cartoonist, asserted “There is no political comment, only political statement”. Laxman himself has addressed this inefficacy in his work:

I have been working away at these cartoons for over a quarter of a century now, and I do not think that I can show a single instance of changing the mind of a politician from taking a mad course.... If I had lashed at granite with a feather with the single-minded zeal as I have bestowed on my work, by now I would, perhaps, have been able to show some faint feather marks on the rock ... but not a trace of a dent have my cartoons caused in any sphere of human activity, whether social, economic or political. - R. K. Laxman

However, Chatterjee believes that while some critics argue his satire lacks political activism, it instead fosters a reflective understanding of governance. The Common Man does not intervene; he sees, and this act of seeing—both by the character and by the audience—becomes the central aesthetic and political gesture in Laxman’s work, reinforcing the idea that satire is not merely an instrument of critique but also a means of bearing witness.

Laxman’s storytelling techniques transform single-frame cartoons into reflections on the development of Indian democracy. Across his long, prolific career, his work documents changing political and social circumstances in India. His cartoons combine satire with commentary on the complexities of democratic processes. Laxman's work reinforces that democracy as an evolving system requires continual re-examination and re-assessment.

== Awards and recognition ==
- Padma Bhushan – Govt. of India – 1973
- Padma Vibhushan – Govt. of India – 2005
- Ramon Magsaysay Award for Journalism, Literature and Creative Communication Arts – 1984
- Karnataka Rajyotsava Award – Government of Karnataka – 1983
- Lifetime Achievement Award for Journalism – CNN IBN TV18 – 29 January 2008
- Pune Pandit Award (Scholar of Pune Award) by the Art & Music Foundation for excellence in 'Creative Communication' – 2012
- Honorary Doctorate from the University of Mysore – 2004

There is a chair named after R. K. Laxman at Symbiosis International University.

=== Exhibitions by IIC ===
Exhibitions of Laxman's cartoons organised by Indian Institute of Cartoonists at Indian Cartoon Gallery.

Date	Exhibition	Inaugurated by
6th Feb 2009	R. K. Laxman	Jayaramaraje Urs
8th Feb 2012	R. K. Laxman's Unpublished Doodles	M N Venkatachaliah, Girish Karnad
17th Aug 2013	Famous Fifteen	Tadao Kagaya (Japanese Cartoonist)
21st Oct 2013	Best of Laxman	...
27th Oct 2014	Faces : Laxman's Caricatures	...
23rd Jan.2016	START-UP R. K. Laxman from Koravanji	Usha Srinivas Laxman, M.Shivakumar, Beluru Ramamurthy
15th Oct 2016	Unpublished R.K.Laxman	...
14th Oct 2020	hadhi Exhibition on his 100th Birth Anniversary	...

== Controversies ==
Many of Laxman’s political cartoons excluded The Common Man, focusing on national and international issues. During the 1975-77 Emergency, Indira Gandhi’s government suppressed opposition, suspended civil rights, and censored criticism, including some of Laxman’s cartoons, as he frequently targeted her policies in the 1970s.

A cartoon by R.K. Laxman on the 1965 anti-Hindi agitation in Tamil Nadu, published in an NCERT textbook, sparked protests. Leaders like Jayalalithaa and Karunanidhi demanded its removal, calling it misleading and offensive to Dravidian leaders. Critics argued cartoons distort history and urged using photographs instead for accuracy.

Everytime political crises or divisive discourse arise in India, Laxman’s cartoons are brought back into circulation. For instance, many of Laxman’s cartoons were shared during the 2020-21 Farmers’ Protests in India. Another, during the 2024 Kolkata rape and murder case, Laxman’s cartoon was shared by politician Sukhendu Sekhar Roy in regards to the public outcry and discourse, which sparked more controversy.

== Legacy ==
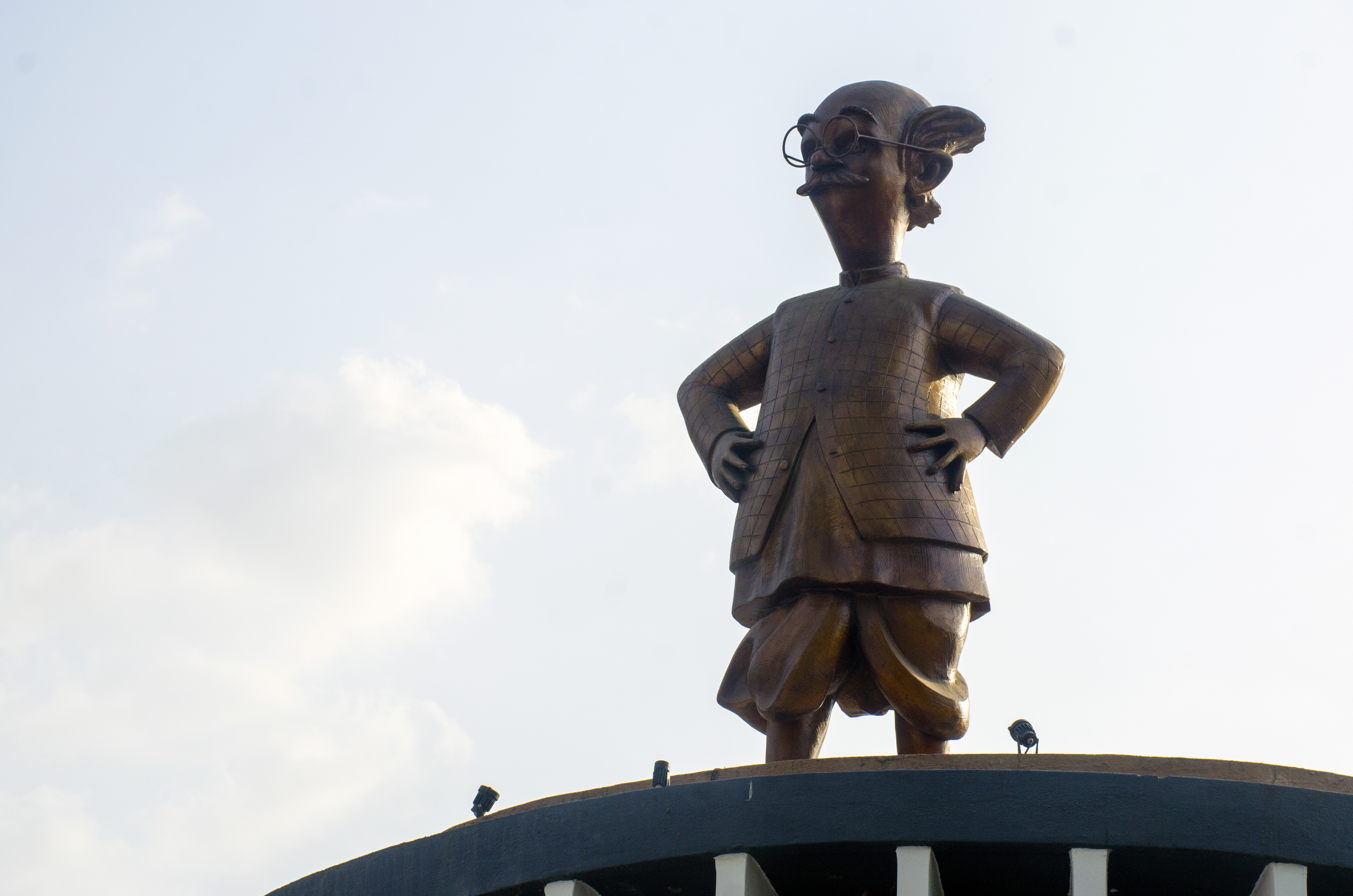
Statue of The Common Man at the entrance of R. K. Laxman Museum

- R K Laxman Museum: R. K. Laxman Museum in Pune houses over 35000 illustrations of R. K. Laxman. The exhibits have been displayed in several galleries. An entire gallery is dedicated to the life of Laxman. It houses rare photos of his childhood and also displays photos of his elder brother the famous novelist R. K. Narayan. The museum also has a light and sound show.

== Popular culture ==
- Actor Asif Ali Beg portrayed R.K.Laxman in Scam 1992, a Sony LIV's original web series based on 1992 Indian stock market scam of Harshad Mehta, where he was shown to be interacting with journalist Sucheta Dalal while working for the Times of India, Mumbai.
- On 24 October 2015, Google featured Laxman on a Google Doodle to honour him on the occasion of his 94th birthday.

== Bibliography ==
- Nag, C. S. (1 October 2012). He Said It! the ... WheelMan Press. ISBN 978-0-9824361-6-5.
- Laxman, R. K. (1988). The Eloquent Brush. Times of India for Benett Coleman & Company.
- Laxman, R. K. (1998). 50 Years of Independence Through the Eyes of R.K. Laxman. The Times Group.
- Laxman, R. K. (1995). The Best of Laxman. Penguin Books. ISBN 9780140148152.
- Laxman, R. K. (February 1989). The Hotel Riviera. Penguin Group (USA) Incorporated. ISBN 978-0-14-010796-8.
- Laxman, R. K. (1 January 1993). The messenger. Penguin. ISBN 9780140236736.
- Laxman, R K (4 April 2002). Servants Of India. Penguin Books Limited. ISBN 978-93-5118-108-8.
- Laxman, R. K. (1 June 1998). The tunnel of time: an autobiography. Viking. ISBN 9780670879564.
- Laxman, Rasipuram Krishnaswamy (2008). Brushing Up the Years: A Cartoonist's History of India, 1947 to the Present. Penguin Books India. ISBN 978-0-14-310366-0.
- Laxman, R K (14 October 2000). Laugh With Laxman. Penguin Books Limited. ISBN 978-93-5118-016-6.
- Laxman, R. K. (1 January 2000). Collected Writings. Penguin Books India. ISBN 978-0-14-100015-2.
- Laxman, R K (1 March 2004). Distorted Mirror. Penguin Books India. ISBN 978-0-14-303133-8.
- Laxman, R K (11 September 2002). Dose Of Laughter. Penguin Books Limited. ISBN 978-93-5118-448-5.
- His autobiography Lakshmanrekha is published in Marathi.
- The Reel World [cartoons] published by Marwah Studio.
- Laxman, R. K.; Ketkar, Kumar (2000). Faces, Through the Eyes of R.K. Laxman. Bennett Coleman & Company.
- Laxman, R. K.; Ṭhakare, Baḷa; Kamath, M. V. (1999). Laughter lines: the cartoon craft of R.K. Laxman & Bal Thackery. Business Publications Inc. ISBN 9788186982822.
- Laxman, R. K. (1975). Doodles. India Book House.
- Laxman, R. K. (1964). You said it. Times of India Press.
- Laxman, R. K. (1969). Sorry, no room. IBH Pub. Co.
- Laxman, R. K. (1990). Calcutta Images. Manjushree Foundation.
- Laxman, R. K. (1985). Madhya Pradesh, Random Sketches. Madhya Pradesh Madhyam, Directorate of Information & Publicity.
- Laxman, R. K. (2012). The Very Best of the Common Man. Penguin Books India. ISBN 978-0-14-341871-9.
- Laxman, R K (30 March 2003). Common Man Balances His Budget. Penguin Group Australia. ISBN 978-0-14-029928-1.
- Laxman, R K. Penguin India Millennium Yearbook. Penguin Books India. ISBN 978-0-670-88841-2.
- Laxman, R K (30 March 2003). Best of Laxman: Common Man Goes to the Village. Penguin Group. ISBN 978-0-14-029931-1.
- Laxman, R. K. (1970). Thama and the Little Bird. India Book House Education Trust.
- Laxman, R K. Common Man Takes A Stroll. Penguin Group. ISBN 978-0-14-029933-5.
- Laxman, R. K. (2001). Laxman Resha. ISBN 978-81-7434-128-0. OCLC 59332853.
- Laxman, R. K. (2002). Common Man Tackles Corruption. Penguin Group. ISBN 978-0-14-302804-8.
- Laxman, R. K. (1952). The Financial Expert. Knopf Doubleday Publishing Group. ISBN 9780345803849.
- Laxman, R. K. (1982). Science Smiles. IBH Publishing Company.
- Laxman, R. K. (2005). Laxman Rekhas. Bennett Coleman & Company. ISBN 978-81-89906-47-4.
- Rangnekar, Sharu; Aras, Kishor; Laxman, R. K.; Pama Rangnekar (1977). In the Wonderland of Indian Managers. Vikas Publ.
- Laxman, R. K. (1982). Idle Hours: Short Stories, Travelogues, Essays, Anecdotes. IBH Publishing Company.
- Laxman, R. K. (2009). R. K. Laxman: The Uncommon Man : Collection of Works from 1948 to 2008. Dharmendra Bhandari. ISBN 978-81-908606-0-4.
- Laxman, R K (1 November 2000). Penguin India Yearbook 2001. Penguin Books India. ISBN 978-0-14-100261-3.
- Mitra, Debkumar; Laxman, R.K. (1 January 2009). Penguin India Desk Companion, The - 2010. Penguin Group. ISBN 978-0-14-306718-4.
- Laxman, R K (30 March 2003). Common Man Watches Cricket. Penguin Group. ISBN 978-0-14-029932-8.
- Laxman, R. K. (1 January 2003). A Vote for Laughter. Penguin Books. ISBN 978-0-14-303086-7.
- Rangnekar, Sharu; Ṭhākara, Dineśa; Laxman, R. K. (2013). Prabandhananāṃ mūḷatattvo: In the world of corporate managersno Gujarātī anuvāda (in Gujarati). Navasarjana Pablikeśana. ISBN 978-93-81443-72-9.
- Rangnekar, Sharu; Ṭhākura, Dineśa; Laxman, R. K.; Viveka Mehetre (2010). Menejamenṭa śī rīte śīkhī śakāya tamārī patnī pāsethī. Navarsajana Pablikeśana.
- Unny, E.P. (2022). RK Laxman: Back with a Punch. Niyogi Books. ISBN 978-93-91125-27-1.

(He also wrote a book named Banker Margiah in Kannada to create awareness about Banking, about how to open a bank account by a common man. Later a movie was reseased. Which was awarded National Award as well.).

== Multimedia ==
- India Through The Eyes of R. K. Laxman – Then To Now (CD-ROM).
- R K Laxman Ki Duniya, a television show on SAB TV.
- Wagle Ki Duniya, a television show on DD National.
