= R. K. Laxman Museum =

Museum in Pune, India

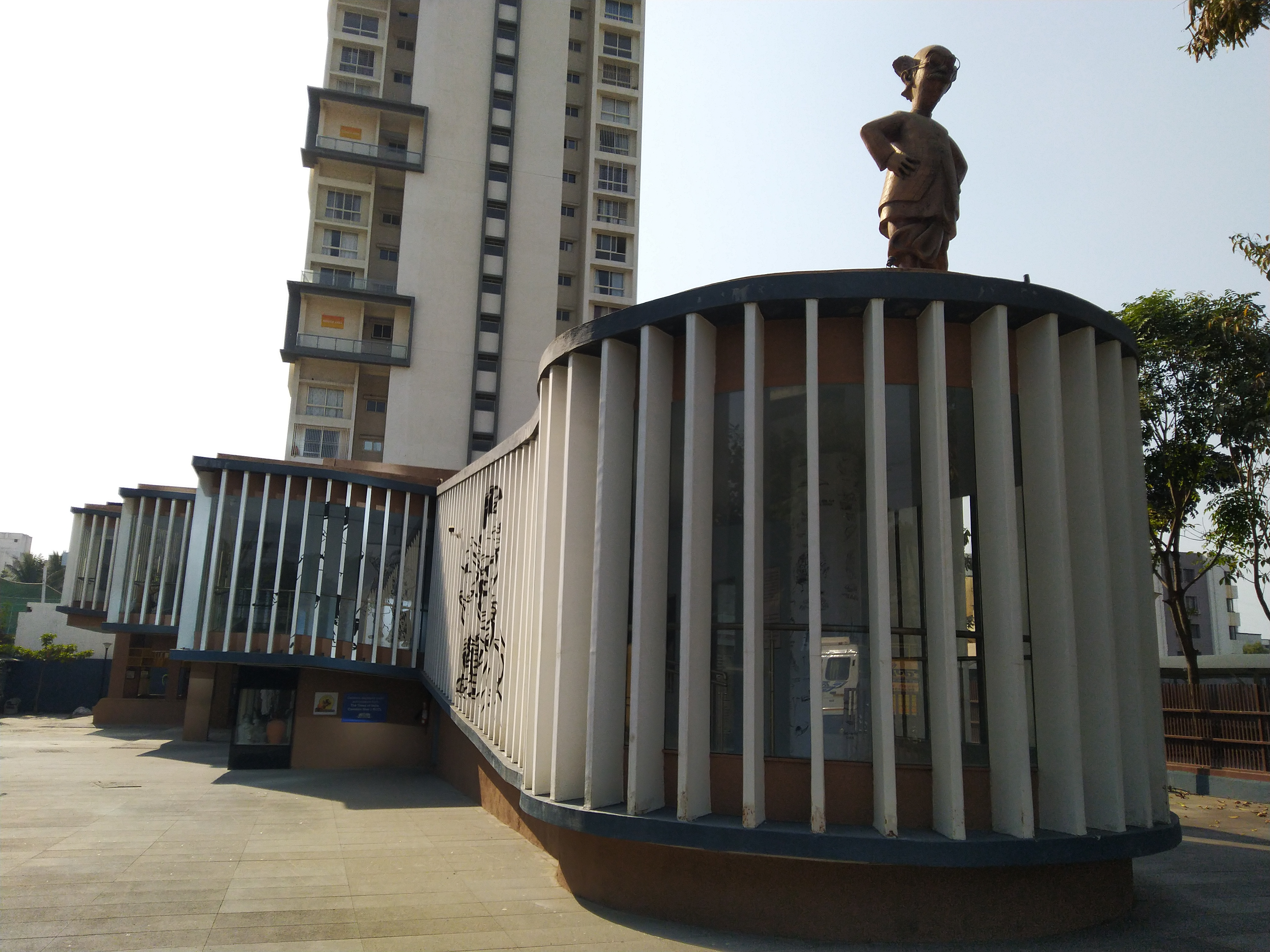
- Exterior of the museum building
- Established: 6 March 2022
- Location: Balewadi, Pune, Maharashtra, India
- Coordinates: 18.573367°N 73.770666°E
- Type: Single-artist museum
- Architects: Architect DhairyaSheel Powar; UNITECTURE (https://unitecture.co/)
- Owner: Pune Municipal Corporation
- Website: www.rklaxmanmuseum.com

The R. K. Laxman Museum is a single-artist museum located in Balewadi area of Pune, Maharashtra. It is dedicated to the life and works of R. K. Laxman, one of India's most popular cartoonists and illustrators. The Government of Maharashtra and the Pune Municipal Corporation collaborated to create this museum which was inaugurated on 6 March 2022 by Prime Minister Narendra Modi. This international award-winning structure designed by Unitecture, a consultancy firm led by architect DhairyaSheel Ramesh Powar.

== Background ==
In career spanning more than 70 years, Laxman created over 35,000 cartoons and illustrations. After he died on 26 January 2015, his daughter Usha undertook the task of compiling the works for the purpose of creating the museum. The idea came to fruition when the state government and the local municipal body joined in. The architecture of the museum was executed by design consultancy firm Unitecture. The work had begun in 2015 and handed over to Laxman family in 2018 to design the art galleries. However, it was delayed by over 8 months due to the COVID-19 pandemic. Eventually, the museum was inaugurated in 2022.

== Galleries and exhibits ==
The layout of the museum consists of several galleries, a cafeteria, two audio-visual rooms, and exhibition halls. A life-size portrait of Laxman's The Common Man greets the visitors and the tourists. The entire life story of Laxman is narrated by the Common Man, who takes the visitors through a mixed-media journey, telling them the story of the man who created him. In the welcome note to the museum, the Common Man, says: “A grand welcome to the R. K. Laxman Museum. I am your host and I will give you a visual experience of this museum and tell you the story of the man you created me.”

The gallery showing Laxman's life has a portion that depicts his childhood spent with his elder brother, R. K. Narayan, the creator of Malgudi Days, and a prominent figure of modern Indian English writing. Laxman had in fact begun his career by illustrating Narayan's books.

In the caricature section of the photo gallery, Laxman's caricature sketches of famous personalities are showcased. A particular section also shows Laxman's depictions of the elephant-headed god, Ganesha in various forms, while another space of the gallery is dedicated to his cartoons on children. The outdoor galleries show his cartoons about the Mumbai administration, and some of The Common Man sketches. Textual panels on the walls, and audio-visual frames guide the visitors through the museum.

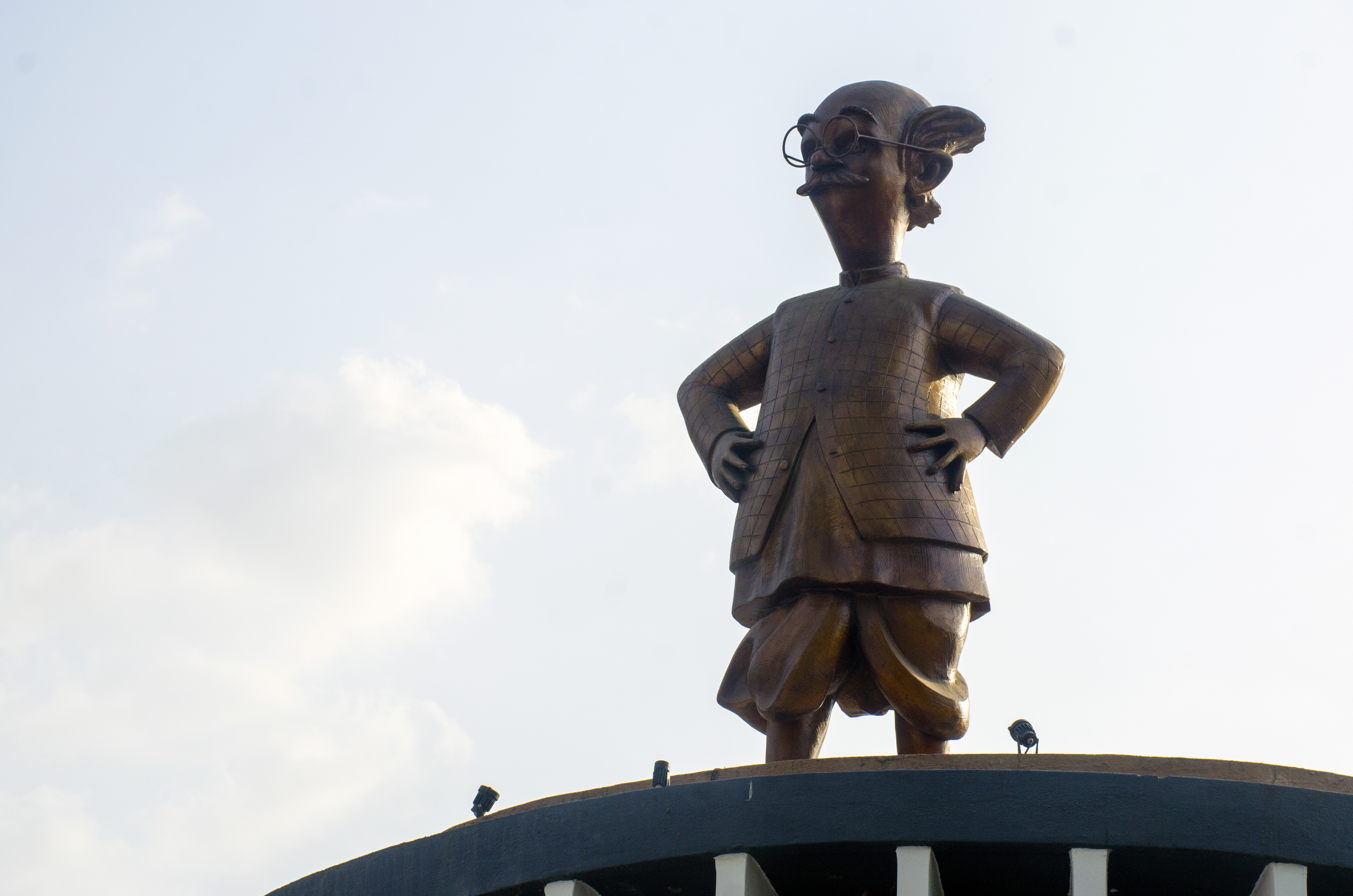
Statue of Common Man at the entrance of R K Laxman Museum

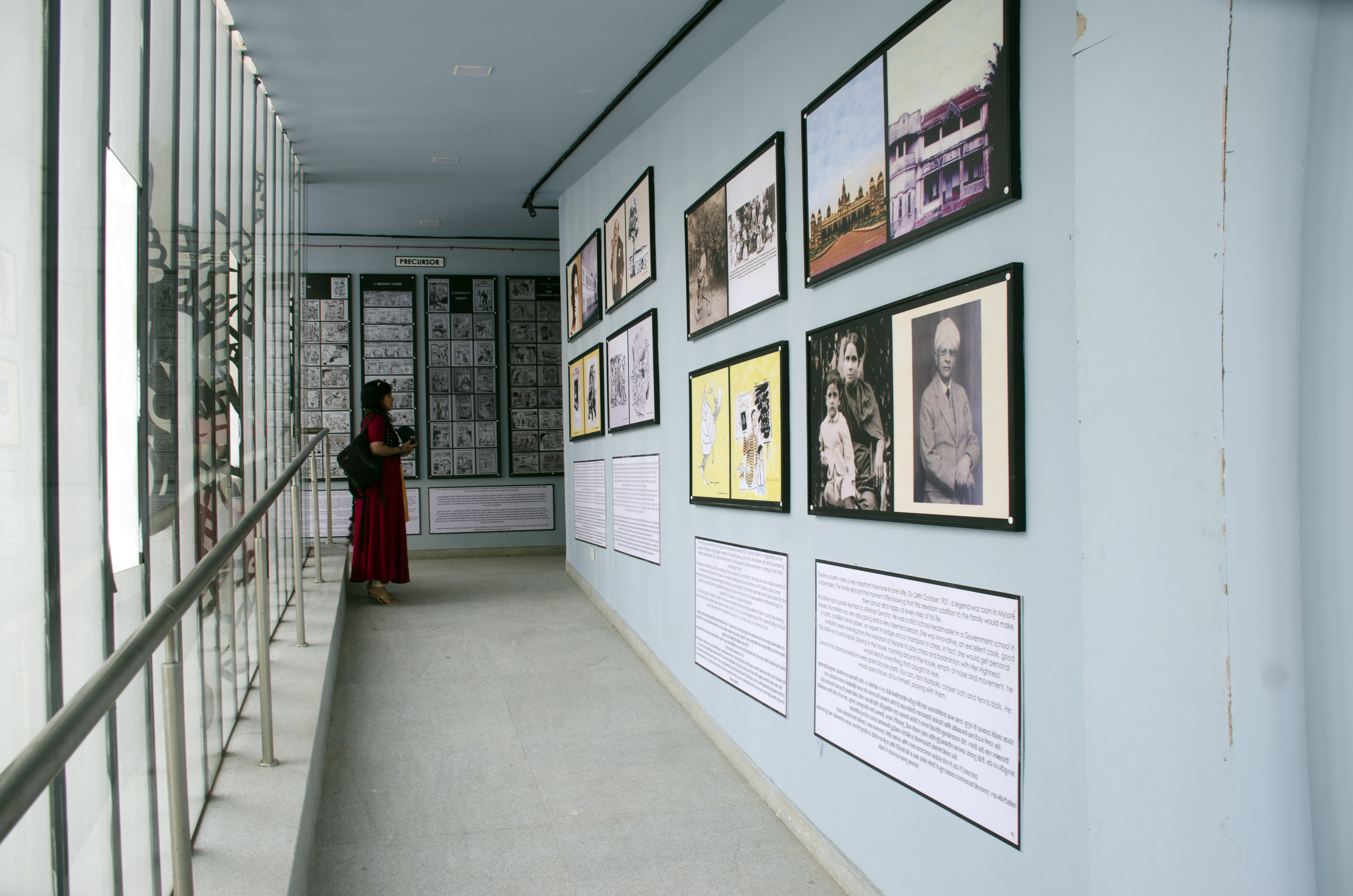
A gallery inside R K Laxman Museum

Two different shows, one a documentary on Laxman's life, and another a light-and-sound show on Malgudi days, take place in the two dedicated audio-visual rooms within the museum. The light-and-sound brings to life the town of Malgudi, that Narayan had fictitiously created.

A dedicated gallery space deals with the crow, Laxman's favourite bird. The gallery houses the various sketches of the bird made by the cartoonist, as well as models of the birds busy in different activities. Laxman was fond of them as he found them energetic, naughty and intelligent. He could even distinguish one from the other, and had different names for them.

His last cartoon made on 20 December 2014 for the occasion of India's Mars Orbiter Mission, Mangalayan's completion of hundred days on the Martian orbit is housed in the audio-visual gallery. It shows the Common Man travelling towards the red planet with a national flag in his hand. His son Arun, employed at ISRO, is referred to in the note along with the cartoon.

Today, Laxman's grand daughter Rimanika carries her grandfather's legacy forward. She has created the Common Woman, presenting a gendered version of the societal caricature that Laxman's immortal cartoon featured.

== Architectural Design ==
The architectural design of the building displays the character of great cartoonist R. K. Laxman in an abstract and minimal way. The structure is designed as three layer skin system to avoid sun glare and making outer passages as thermal barrier for inner exhibition area. The outer area is actually covered by concrete sandwich panels. Those panels have replicas of R K Laxman's popular cartoons. The cartoons are wrapped around fins with overlapping of areas creating an effect of a static flipbook. The user feels like these caricatures interact with audience while passing by the structure on its pathway with various angles, speed and motion. On the arrival, one has to go around the column on which a statue of popular character by R K Laxman is placed as a tribute to legendary cartoonist. The use of conventional materials has been used in an unconventional way. The team UNITECTURE has received a few national and international awards for their innovative design of this structure.
