= Ponvizha =

- Directed by: Ashokan
- Written by: Ashokan
- Produced by: K. S. Srinivasan; K. S. Sivaram
- Starring: Napoleon; Suvalakshmi
- Cinematography: P. S. Tharan
- Edited by: B. Lenin; V. T. Vijayan
- Music by: Deva
- Production company: Shiva Shree
- Release date: 6 August 1999
- Running time: 150 minutes
- Country: India
- Language: Tamil

Ponvizha (transl. Golden Jubilee) is a 1999 Indian Tamil-language drama film directed by Ashokan, who had previously directed the film Thamizhachi (1995). The film stars Napoleon and Suvalakshmi. It was released on 6 August 1999.

== Plot ==
Ponni lives with her grandmother and they are set aside by the villagers. Bharathi, a jobless man, lands in Ponni's village, where Manivanan is village chief(gounder).

In the past, Ponni was in the village and she was going to marry. Before the marriage, the villagers including her father and Velusamy got into an accident and many villagers lost their lives in the accident. Since that day, the villagers began to hate Ponni. Bharathi was, in fact, the lorry driver who perpetrated the accident but nobody knows about it.

Bharathi felt guilty for the accident and is now on a quest for redemption so he wants to help Ponni.

== Cast ==
- Napoleon as Bharathi
- Suvalakshmi as Ponni
- Manivannan as Vettu Gounder
- Ranjith as Velusamy
- Swathi as Parvathi
- Senthil
- Balu Anand
- Crane Manohar
- S. N. Lakshmi as Ponni's grandmother
- Sukumari
- Visu as a district collector (guest appearance)

== Soundtrack ==
The soundtrack was composed by Deva.

Song	Singer(s)	Lyrics	Duration
"Adiye Annakiliye"	Swarnalatha, Bharathi	Piraisoodan	5:31
"Barma Bazaru"	Sabesh, Sindhu	Kalidasan	4:26
"Kammangaatu"	Gangai Amaran, Sindhu	Kasthuri Raja	4:52
"Konjum Kilikku"	Gangai Amaran, Mahanadhi Shobana	Kadhal Mathi	5:11
"Naadu Sezhikka"	Chorus	Piraisoodan	5:33
"Ponni Nadhi"	S. P. Balasubrahmanyam, Anuradha Sriram	Ashokan	5:11
