= The Common Man =

Comic character created by R. K. Laxman

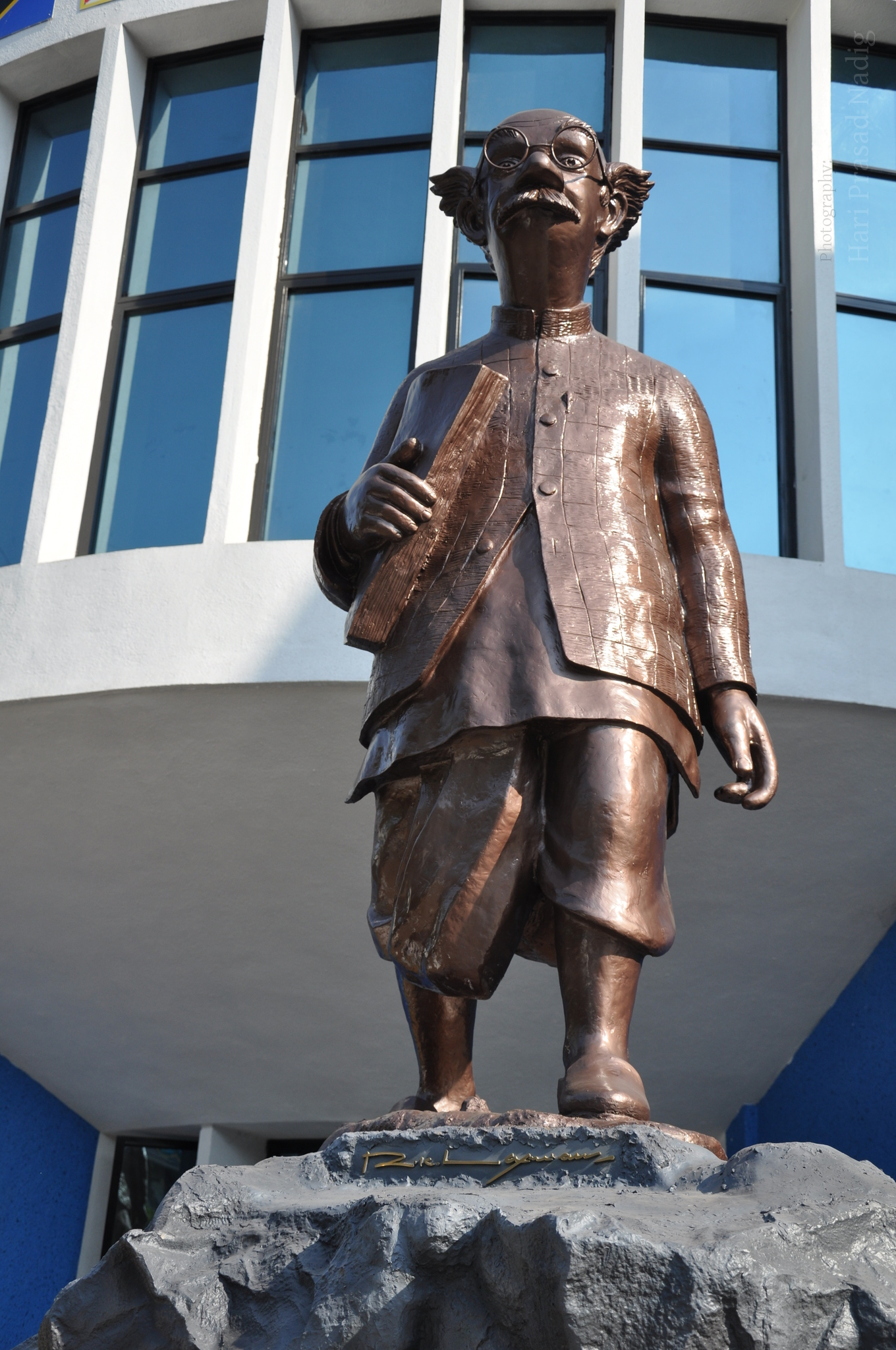
- The Common Man by R. K. Laxman

Publication information
- Publisher: The Times of India
- First appearance: You Said It (1951)
- Created by: R. K. Laxman

In-story information
- Species: Human
- Place of origin: India

The Common Man is a cartoon character created by Indian author and cartoonist R. K. Laxman. For over a half of a century, the Common Man has represented the hopes, aspirations, troubles and perhaps even foibles of the average Indian, through a daily comic strip, You Said It in The Times of India. The comic was started in 1951.

When Laxman began to draw cartoons in The Times of India, he attempted to represent different states and cultures in India. In the rush to meet deadlines, he began to draw fewer and fewer background characters, until finally he found only one remaining—the now-familiar Common Man. The Common Man generally acts as a silent witness to all the action in the comic. According to anthropologist Ritu Gairola Khanduri, "Clad in a dhoti and a plaid jacket, the puzzled Common Man is no dupe: his sharp observations miss no detail of the political circus."

== Other depictions ==
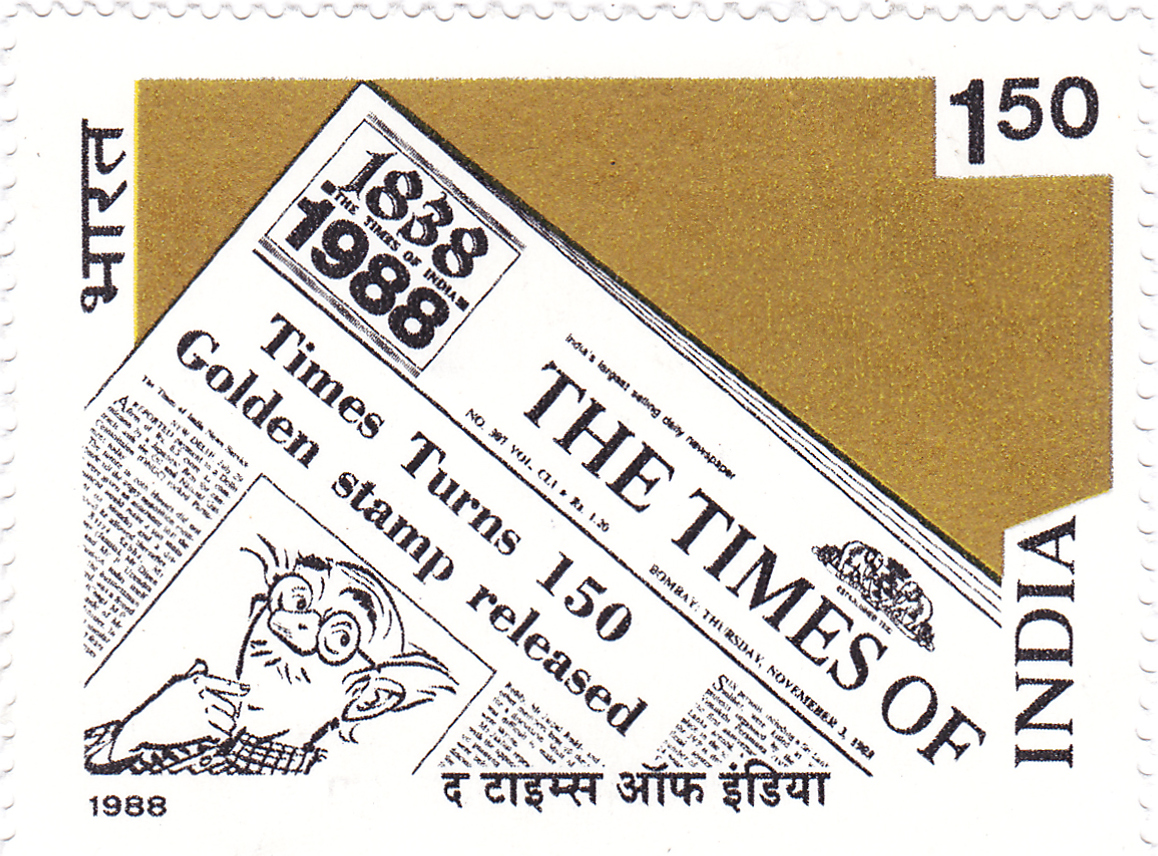
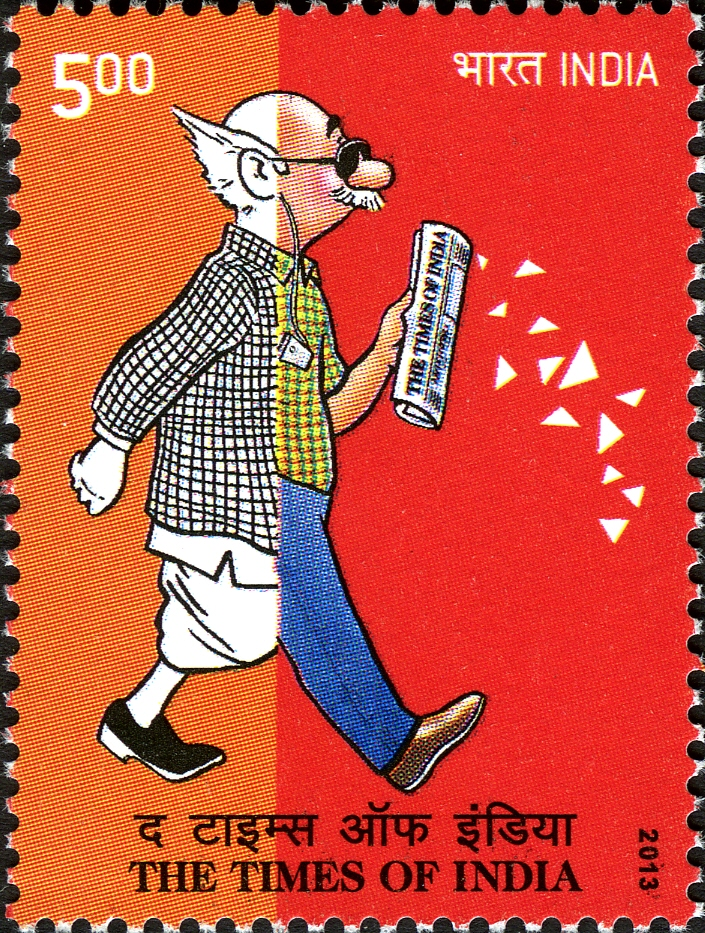
The Common Man featured in 1988 and 2013 commemorative stamps
- The Common Man featured in a commemorative postage stamp released by the Indian Postal Service on the 150th anniversary of the Times of India in 1988. It became one of the most recognised feature on The Times of India the largest-circulation English language daily broadsheet newspaper in the world.
- On 24 October 2015, Google featured the Common Man on a Google Doodle to honour R. K. Laxman on the occasion of his 94th birthday.
- The Common Man was the mascot for the low budget airline Air Deccan.
- The character was adapted into the Indian television series Wagle Ki Duniya on DD National and R K Laxman Ki Duniya on SAB TV.
- Salman Rushdie, who grew up in Bombay on a daily fare of Laxman's pocket cartoons, mentions the Common Man in two of his books—his 1995 novel The Moor's Last Sigh and his 2012 autobiography, Joseph Anton.

=== Statues ===
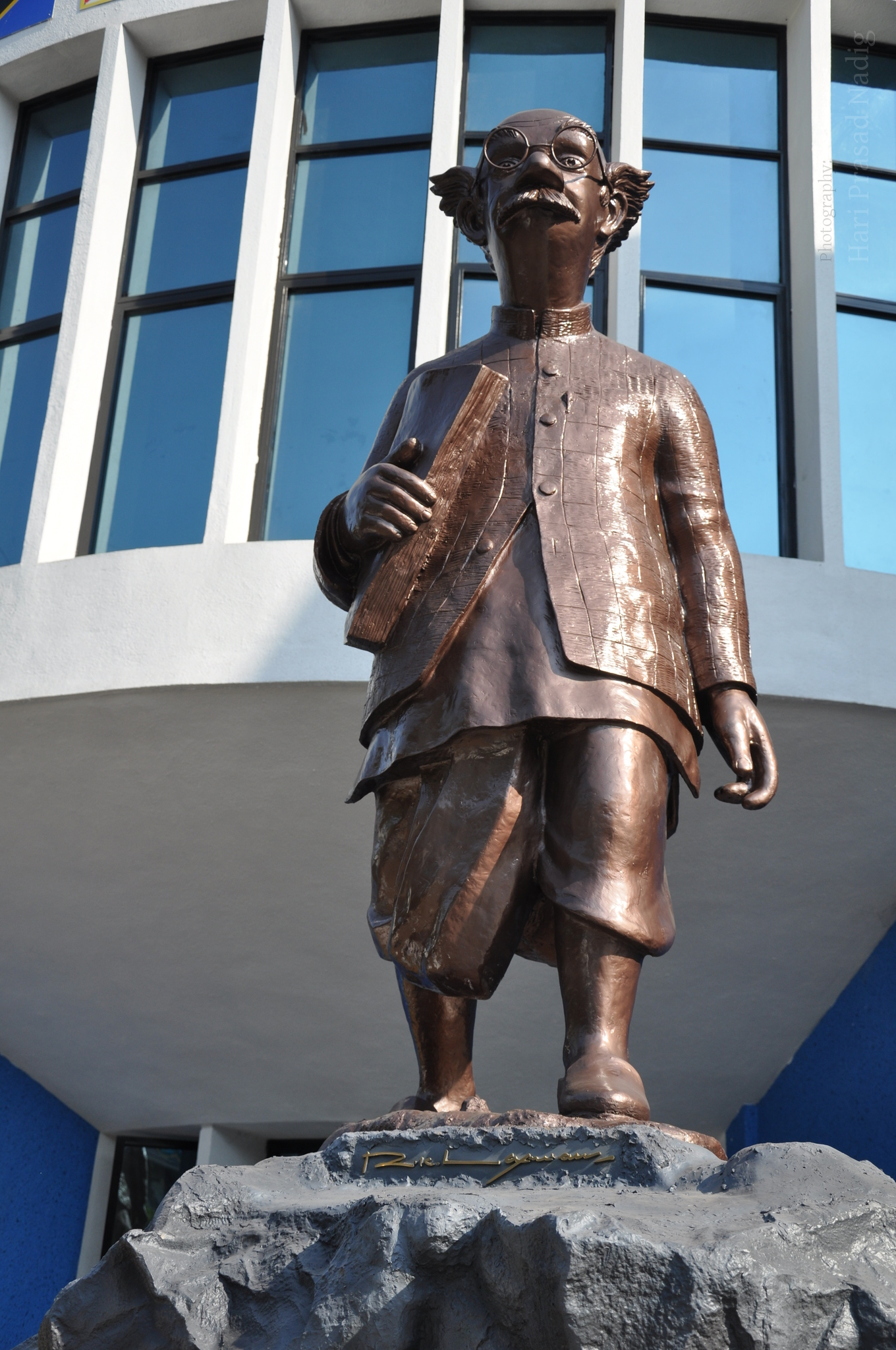
"The Common Man" at Symbiosis International University, Pune

- An 8.2 feet high bronze statue of "The Common Man" has been erected at the Symbiosis International University, Pune in front of its Vishwabhavan building. The Common Man has a wisp of white hair that is perpetually standing, leaving him with a bewildered look.
- A statue of The Common Man, created by the sculptor Suresh Sakpal, was installed in 2007 along the sea face on Khan Abdul Ghaffar Khan road, Worli seaface, Mumbai.
- A statue of The Common Man is erected at the entrance of R. K. Laxman Museum at Balewadi, Pune.
