= Paampu attam =

Pampattam (snake dance) (Tamil:பாம்பாட்டம்) is a folk dance from Tamil country, India. Snakes considered as the protecting divinity which safeguards the health and prosperity. Snakes are also related to the Hindu deity Murugan. Usually girls perform this dance with a snake skin-like costume. The performer simulates snake movements, writhing, creeping and making quick biting movements with the head and hands. The hands are also held together to look like the hood of a cobra.

In the classical dance form Bharata Natyam the snake dance is performed in a manner similar to the old folk dance.
