= Kumudam =

Tamil weekly magazine

- Asin and Suriya on 10 October 2007 cover of Kumudam
- Frequency: Weekly
- Total circulation (1986): 620,000
- Founder: S.A.P Annamalai; P.V. Parthasarathy
- Founded: 1947; 78 years ago
- Company: Kumudam Group
- Country: India
- Based in: Chennai, Tamil Nadu
- Language: Tamil
- Website: Kumudam.com
- OCLC: 416964234

Kumudam is a Tamil weekly magazine published in Chennai, Tamil Nadu India. It was founded in 1948 by S.A.P. Annamalai, and his close friend and confidant P.V. Parthasarathy. Now the magazine is published under the Kumudam Group, which also publishes other Tamil magazines including Kumudam Reporter, Kumudam Snehidi, Kumudam Bhakti, Kumudam Jothidam, Kumudam Theeranadhi. The Kumudam Group started a Telugu spiritual magazine called Kumudam Bhakthi Special.

It had a circulation of 620,000 copies in 1986. The website kumudam.com attracted over 66,000 visitors in 2008, according to a Compete.com survey.

== Criticism ==
In September 2015, Kumudam faced criticism when an article published in Kumudam Reporter criticised women wearing leggings. The women's pictures used in the article were reportedly printed without consent. The article received considerable social media attention, resulting in a petition on Change.org, which received over 17,500 signatures.
