= List of Penguin Classics =

This is a list of books published as Penguin Classics.

In 1996, Penguin Books published as a paperback A Complete Annotated Listing of Penguin Classics and Twentieth-Century Classics (ISBN 0-14-771090-1).

This article covers editions in the series: black label (1970s), colour-coded spines (1980s), the most recent editions (2000s), Little Clothbound Classics Series (2020s) and up until the letter D.

== By title ==
=== A ===
- Abortion Stories: American Literature Before Roe v. Wade
- The Absentee by Maria Edgeworth
- About Love by Anton Chekhov
- According to Mark by Penelope Lively
- The Acts of King Arthur and His Noble Knights by John Steinbeck
- The Actual by Saul Bellow
- Adam Bede by George Eliot
- Adolphe by Benjamin Constant
- The Adventure of the Blue Carbuncle by Arthur Conan Doyle
- The Adventures of Augie March by Saul Bellow
- The Adventures of David Simple by Sarah Fielding
- The Adventures of Huckleberry Finn by Mark Twain
- The Adventures of Pinocchio by Carlo Collodi
- The Adventures of Roderick Random by Tobias Smollett
- The Adventures of Sherlock Holmes by Arthur Conan Doyle
- The Adventures of Tom Sawyer by Mark Twain
- The Aeneid by Virgil
- An African Millionaire by Grant Allen
- African Myths of Origin
- After Midnight by Irmgard Keun
- Against Nature by Joris-Karl Huysmans
- Against Sainte-Beuve and Other Essays by Marcel Proust
- Against Slavery: An Abolitionist Reader
- Agapē Agape by William Gaddis
- The Age of Alexander by Plutarch
- The Alexiad by Anna Comnena
- All God's Chillun Got Pride by Chester Himes
- The Age of Bede
- The Age of Innocence by Edith Wharton
- Agnes Grey by Anne Brontë
- The Agricola by Tacitus
- Alcestis, Hippolytus and Iphigenia in Tauris by Euripides
- The Aleph and Other Stories by Jorge Luis Borges
- Alfred the Great: Including Asser's Life of King Alfred
- Alice's Adventures in Wonderland by Lewis Carroll
- All Desire is a Desire for Being by René Girard
- All My Sons by Arthur Miller
- The All-Pervading Melodious Drumbeat by Ra Yeshe Senge
- All's Well That Ends Well by William Shakespeare
- Along This Way by James Weldon Johnson
- Alpine Giggle Week by Dorothy Parker
- The Amateur Emigrant by Robert Louis Stevenson
- The Ambassadors by Henry James
- America and Americans and Selected Nonfiction by John Steinbeck
- The American by Henry James
- The American Clock by Arthur Miller
- American Indian Stories, Legends, and Other Writings by Zitkala-Ša
- American Local Color Writing, 1880-1920 by multiple authors
- American Notes for General Circulation by Charles Dickens
- American Places by Wallace and Page Stegner
- American Scriptures: An Anthology of Sacred Writings edited by Laurie F. Maffly-Kipp
- American Supernatural Tales edited by S. T. Joshi
- Amerika by Franz Kafka
- America is in the Heart by Carlos Bulosan
- The Analects by Confucius
- The Anatomy of Melancholy by Robert Burton
- The Ancien Régime and the Revolution by Alexis de Tocqueville
- Ancient Sorceries and Other Weird Stories by Algernon Blackwood
- Ancrene Wisse: A Guide for Anchoresses
- Andromache, Britannicus and Berenice by Jean Racine
- Angle of Repose by Wallace Stegner
- Animal Farm by George Orwell
- Ann Veronica by H. G. Wells
- Anna Karenina by Leo Tolstoy
- The Annals of Imperial Rome by Tacitus
- The Annotated Archy and Mehitabel by Don Marquis
- The Anti-Christ by Friedrich Nietzsche
- Anti-Oedipus by Gilles Deleuze and Félix Guattari
- Anton Reiser by Karl Philipp Moritz
- Antony and Cleopatra by William Shakespeare
- Aphorisms by Georg Christoph Lichtenberg
- Apocalypse by D. H. Lawrence
- Apologia Pro Vita Sua by John Henry Newman
- An Apology for Raymond Sebond by Michel de Montaigne
- Appointment in Samarra by John O'Hara
- The Apprentice Tourist by Mário de Andrade
- The Arabian Nights: Tales of 1,001 Nights
- Arabian Sands by Wilfred Thesiger
- The Aran Islands by J. M. Synge
- The Archbishop's Ceiling by Arthur Miller
- The Archeologist and Selected Sea Stories by Andreas Karkavitsas
- Ardhakathanak (A Half Story) by Banarasidas
- Areopagitica and Other Writings by John Milton
- Armadale by Wilkie Collins
- Army Life in a Black Regiment and Other Writings by Thomas Wentworth Higginson
- Around the World in Eighty Days by Jules Verne
- Around the World in Seventy-Two Days: And Other Writings by Nellie Bly
- Arsène Lupin, Gentleman-Thief by Maurice Leblanc
- The Art of Happiness by Epicurus
- The Art of Rhetoric by Aristotle
- The Art of War by Sun Tzu
- The Arthashastra by Kautilya
- Arthurian Romances by Chrétien de Troyes
- As I Crossed a Bridge of Dreams by Lady Sarashina
- Aspects of the Novel by E. M. Forster
- The Aspern Papers by Henry James
- L'Assommoir (The Drinking Den) by Émile Zola
- At Fault by Kate Chopin
- Atalanta in Calydon by Algernon Charles Swinburne
- The Athenian Constitution by Aristotle
- Au Bonheur des Dames by Émile Zola
- Aurora Leigh and Other Poems by Elizabeth Barrett Browning
- Autobiography by Benvenuto Cellini
- Autobiography by Morrissey
- The Autobiography and Other Writings by Benjamin Franklin
- The Autobiography of an Ex-Coloured Man by James Weldon Johnson
- Autobiographies by Charles Darwin
- The Awakening and Selected Stories by Kate Chopin
- The Awkward Age by Henry James

=== B ===
- Babur Nama: Journal of Emperor Babur
- The Bacchae and Other Plays (Ion, The Women of Troy, Helen) by Euripides
- The Barber of Seville by Pierre Beaumarchais
- Barlaam and Josaphat: A Christian Tale of the Buddha by Gui de Cambrai
- Barchester Towers by Anthony Trollope
- Barnaby Rudge by Charles Dickens
- Baron Bagge by Alexander Lernet-Holenia
- Baudelaire in English
- Bayou Folk by Kate Chopin
- Beauty by Andy Warhol
- Been Down So Long It Looks Like Up to Me by Richard Fariña
- The Beast Within by Émile Zola
- The Beggar's Opera by John Gay
- Behind the Scenes by Elizabeth Keckley
- Bel-Ami by Guy de Maupassant
- The Bell by Iris Murdoch
- Beowulf: A Glossed Text
- Beowulf: A Prose Translation
- Beowulf: A Verse Translation
- La Bête Humaine by Émile Zola
- The Betrothed by Alessandro Manzoni
- Between Past and Future by Hannah Arendt
- Beyond Good and Evil by Friedrich Nietzsche
- The Bhagavad Gita
- The Bible (King James, Authorized Version of 1611) edited by David Norton
- Billy Budd and Other Tales (including Bartleby, the Scrivener and Benito Cereno) by Herman Melville
- The Birds and Other Plays (The Knights, Peace, The Assemblywomen and Wealth) by Aristophanes
- The Birth of Tragedy by Friedrich Nietzsche
- The Black Arrow by Robert Louis Stevenson
- "Black Empire" by George S. Schuyler
- Black Lamb and Grey Falcon by Rebecca West
- Black Panther by Don McGregor, Rich Buckler, Billy Graham, Stan Lee, Jack Kirby
- The Black Prince by Iris Murdoch
- The Black Sheep by Honoré de Balzac
- The Black Tulip by Alexandre Dumas
- The Blazing World and Other Writings by Margaret Cavendish
- Bleak House by Charles Dickens
- Bliss by Katherine Mansfield
- The Blithedale Romance by Nathaniel Hawthorne
- Blood, Toil, Tears and Sweat: The Great Speeches by Winston Churchill
- Bodily Secrets by William Trevor
- Bonjour Tristesse and A Certain Smile by Francoise Sagan
- The Book of Chuang Tzu
- The Book of the City of Ladies by Christine de Pizan
- The Book of Contemplation: Islam and the Crusades by Usama ibn Munqidh
- The Book of the Courtier by Baldassare Castiglione
- The Book of Dede Korkut
- The Book of Disquiet by Fernando Pessoa
- The Book of Imaginary Beings by Jorge Luis Borges
- The Book of Margery Kempe by Margery Kempe
- The Book of Master Mo by Mo Zi
- The Book of Mormon translated by Joseph Smith Jr.
- Botchan by Natsume Sōseki
- The Bostonians by Henry James
- The Bounty Mutiny by William Bligh and Edward Christian
- Bouvard and Pecuchet with the Dictionary of Received Ideas by Gustave Flaubert
- Brand by Henrik Ibsen
- The Bride of Lammermoor by Walter Scott
- Brighton Rock by Graham Greene
- Brigitta and Other Tales by Adalbert Stifter
- Brodie's Report by Jorge Luis Borges
- The Brothers Karamazov by Fyodor Dostoyevsky
- The Broken Nest by Rabindranath Tagore
- Buddhist Scriptures
- The Burial of the Rats by Bram Stoker
- The Burned Sinner and the Harmonious Angels by Clarice Lispector
- Burning Bright by John Steinbeck
- A Burnt-Out Case by Graham Greene
- But Gentlemen Marry Brunettes by Anita Loos
- By the Open Sea by August Strindberg

=== C ===
- Caleb Williams by William Godwin
- The Call of Cthulhu and Other Weird Stories by H. P. Lovecraft
- The Call of the Wild, White Fang, and Other Stories by Jack London
- The Campaigns of Alexander by Arrian
- Can You Forgive Her? by Anthony Trollope
- Candide by Voltaire
- Cannery Row by John Steinbeck
- Can Socialists be Happy? by George Orwell
- The Canterbury Tales by Geoffrey Chaucer
- The Canterbury Tales: The First Fragment by Geoffrey Chaucer
- Capital, Volume I; Capital, Volume II; and Capital, Volume III by Karl Marx
- Capitalism and Slavery by Eric Williams
- Captain America by Jack Kirby, Joe Simon, Stan Lee, Jim Steranko, John Romita Sr.
- Captain Blood by Rafael Sabatini
- Captains Courageous by Rudyard Kipling^{3}
- Carpenter's Gothic by William Gaddis
- The Castle of Otranto by Horace Walpole
- Castle Rackrent by Maria Edgeworth
- Cavalleria Rusticana and Other Stories by Giovanni Verga
- La Celestina (The Spanish Bawd) by Fernando de Rojas
- A Celtic Miscellany translated by Kenneth Hurlstone Jackson
- Chance by Joseph Conrad
- Characters by Jean de la Bruyère
- Charlotte Temple and Lucy Temple by Susanna Rowson
- The Charterhouse of Parma by Stendhal
- Chattering Courtesans and Other Sardonic Sketches by Lucian
- Chess by Stefan Zweig
- Childhood, Boyhood, Youth by Leo Tolstoy
- A Christmas Carol and Other Christmas Writings by Charles Dickens
- The Chimes by Charles Dickens
- Chronicle of the Narváez Expedition by Álvar Núñez Cabeza de Vaca
- Chronicles by Jean Froissart
- Chronicles of the Canongate by Walter Scott
- Chronicles of the Crusades by Jean de Joinville and Geoffrey of Villehardouin
- Chung Yung
- Cicero's Letters to Atticus by Marcus Tullius Cicero
- Cicada! by Federico García Lorca
- The Cid, Cinna, The Theatrical Illusion by Pierre Corneille
- The Cistercian World: Monastic Writings of the Twelfth Century
- City of God by St.Augustine
- City of Gold by Len Deighton
- Civil Disobedience by Henry David Thoreau
- Closely Watched Trains by Bohumil Hrabal
- The Civil War by Julius Caesar
- The Civil Wars by Appian
- Clarissa by Samuel Richardson
- The Classic of Mountains and Seas
- Classical Literary Criticism
- Clotel, or The President's Daughter by William Wells Brown
- The Cloud of Unknowing and Other Works
- Coal by Audre Lorde
- Cold Comfort Farm by Stella Gibbons
- Collected Poems by Arthur Rimbaud
- Collected Poems by Kingsley Amis
- Collected Stories by Saul Bellow
- Collected Stories by Vladimir Nabokov
- Colonial American Travel Narratives
- The Comedians by Graham Greene
- The Comedies: Adelphoe, Andria, Eunuchus, Heauton Timorumenos, Hecyra and Phormio by Terence
- The Conquest of Gaul by Julius Caesar
- Common Sense by Thomas Paine
- The Complete Dead Sea Scrolls in English translated by Geza Vermes
- The Complete English Poems by John Donne
- The Complete English Poems by George Herbert
- The Complete Essays by Michel de Montaigne
- The Complete Fables by Aesop
- The Complete Fairy Tales by George MacDonald
- The Complete Odes and Epodes by Horace
- The Complete Plays by Christopher Marlowe
- The Complete Plays, Lenz, and Other Writings by Georg Büchner
- The Complete Poems by William Blake
- The Complete Poems by Samuel Taylor Coleridge
- The Complete Poems by John Keats
- Complete Poems by D. H. Lawrence
- The Complete Poems by Andrew Marvell
- The Complete Poems by John Milton
- Complete Poems by Marianne Moore
- Complete Poems by Dorothy Parker
- The Complete Poems by Christina Rossetti
- The Complete Poems by Jean-Jacques Rousseau
- Complete Short Fiction by Oscar Wilde
- Complete Short Stories by Graham Greene
- Complete Stories by Kingsley Amis
- Complete Stories by Dorothy Parker
- Complete Writings by Phillis Wheatley
- A Confirmed Bachelor by Arthur Schnitzler
- Con Men and Cutpurses: Scenes From the Hogarthian Underworld by Lucy Moore
- The Conference of the Birds by Farid Ud-Din Attar
- A Confession and Other Religious Writings by Leo Tolstoy
- The Confession of a Child of the Century by Alfred de Musset
- Confessions by St. Augustine
- The Confessions by Jean-Jacques Rousseau
- Confessions of an English Opium Eater by Thomas De Quincey
- The Confidence-Man by Herman Melville
- Conjure Tales and Stories of the Colour Line by Charles W. Chesnutt
- A Connecticut Yankee in King Arthur's Court by Mark Twain
- The Conquest of Bread by Peter Kropotkin
- The Conquest of New Spain by Bernal Díaz del Castillo
- The Consolation of Philosophy by Boethius
- Conversations of Socrates by Xenophon
- Conversations with Goethe by Johann Peter Eckermann
- The Count of Monte Cristo by Alexandre Dumas
- Count Magnus and Other Ghost Stories by M. R. James
- The Countess of Pembroke's Arcadia by Philip Sidney
- The Country of the Blind and Other Stories by H. G. Wells
- The Country of the Pointed Firs and Other Stories by Sarah Orne Jewett
- Cousin Bette by Honoré de Balzac
- Cousin Phillis by Elizabeth Gaskell
- Cousin Pons by Honoré de Balzac
- Cranford by Elizabeth Gaskell
- Crime and Punishment by Fyodor Dostoyevsky
- Critias by Plato
- The Crucible by Arthur Miller
- The Cruise of the Snark by Jack London
- Cup of Gold by John Steinbeck
- The Curious Case of Benjamin Button and Other Jazz Age Stories by F. Scott Fitzgerald
- The Custom of the Country by Edith Wharton
- Cyrano de Bergerac by Edmond Rostand

=== D ===
- D. H. Lawrence and Italy by D. H. Lawrence
- Daddy-Long-Legs by Jean Webster
- Daisy Miller by Henry James
- D'Alembert's Dream by Denis Diderot
- The Damnation of Theron Ware by Harold Frederic
- The Damned by Joris-Karl Huysmans
- Daniel Deronda by George Eliot
- Dangerous Liaisons by Choderlos de Laclos
- Dangling Man by Saul Bellow
- Daphnis and Chloe by Longus
- The Dark Eidolon and Other Fantasies by Clark Ashton Smith
- Dashing Diamond Dick and Other Classic Dime Novels
- David Copperfield by Charles Dickens
- De Anima by Aristotle
- De Profundis and Other Writings by Oscar Wilde
- A Dead Man's Memoir (A Theatrical Novel) by Mikhail Bulgakov
- Dead Souls by Nikolai Gogol
- The Dean's December by Saul Bellow
- Dear Enemy by Jean Webster
- A Death in the Family by James Agee
- Death in Venice and Other Tales by Thomas Mann
- Death of a Hero by Richard Aldington
- The Death of Ivan Ilyich and Other Stories by Leo Tolstoy
- The Death of Jim Loney by James Welch
- The Death of King Arthur (Mort Artu)
- Death of a Salesman by Arthur Miller
- The Decameron by Giovanni Boccaccio
- Declarations of War by Len Deighton
- Decline and Fall by Evelyn Waugh
- The Deerslayer by James Fenimore Cooper
- Democracy in America by Alexis de Tocqueville
- Demons by Fyodor Dostoyevsky
- Demosthenes and Aeschines (On the Embassy, On the Crown, Against Ctesiphon)
- The Descent of Man by Charles Darwin
- The Description of Wales by Gerald of Wales
- The Desert Fathers: Sayings of the Early Christian Monks
- Despair by Vladimir Nabokov
- Desperate Remedies by Thomas Hardy
- The Devils by Fyodor Dostoyevsky
- The Dhammapada
- Dialogues Concerning Natural Religion by David Hume
- The Diaries of Samuel Pepys by Samuel Pepys
- The Diary of Lady Murasaki by Murasaki Shikibu
- Diary of a Madman and Other Stories by Nikolai Gogol
- A Dictionary of the English Language: an Anthology by Samuel Johnson
- Difficulties with Girls by Kingsley Amis
- The Digest of Roman Law by Justinian
- Dirty Bird Blues by Clarence Major
- Discourse on Inequality by Jean-Jacques Rousseau
- Discourse on Method and Related Writings by René Descartes
- Discourses by Epictetus
- The Discourses by Niccolò Machiavelli
- The Discovery of India by Jawaharlal Nehru
- Dispatches for the New York Tribune by Karl Marx, edited by James Ledbetter and Francis Wheen
- The Distracted Preacher and Other Stories by Thomas Hardy
- The Divine Comedy, Volume 1: Hell by Dante Alighieri, translated by Dorothy Sayers
- The Divine Comedy, Volume 1: Inferno by Dante Alighieri, translated by Mark Musa
- The Divine Comedy, Volume 1: Inferno by Dante Alighieri, translated by Robin Kirkpatrick
- The Divine Comedy, Volume 2: Purgatorio by Dante Alighieri, translated by Mark Musa
- The Divine Comedy, Volume 2: Purgatorio by Dante Alighieri, translated by Robin Kirkpatrick
- The Divine Comedy, Volume 2: Purgatory by Dante Alighieri, translated by Dorothy Sayers
- The Divine Comedy, Volume 3: Paradise by Dante Alighieri, translated by Dorothy Sayers and Barbara Reynolds
- The Divine Comedy, Volume 3: Paradiso by Dante Alighieri, translated by Mark Musa
- The Divine Comedy, Volume 3: Paradiso by Dante Alighieri, translated by Robin Kirkpatrick
- Doctor Thorne by Anthony Trollope
- Dr. Wortle's School by Anthony Trollope
- A Dog's Heart by Mikhail Bulgakov
- A Doll's House and Other Plays (The League of Youth, The Lady From the Sea) by Henrik Ibsen
- Dombey and Son by Charles Dickens
- Domesday Book, translated by Geoffrey Martin
- Domestic Manners of the Americans by Frances Trollope
- Don Juan by Lord Byron
- Don Quixote by Miguel de Cervantes
- Don't Look Now and Other Stories by Daphne du Maurier
- Doveglion: Collected Poems by José Garcia Villa
- Dracula by Bram Stoker
- The Dreams in the Witch House and Other Weird Stories by H. P. Lovecraft
- Dred: A Tale of the Great Dismal Swamp by Harriet Beecher Stowe
- The Drinking Den (L'Assommoir) by Émile Zola

=== E ===
- The Earliest English Poems
- Early American Drama: The Contrast by Royall Tyler, André by William Dunlap, The Indian Princess by James Nelson Barker, The Gladiator by Robert Montgomery Bird, The Drunkard by William Henry Smith, Fashion by Anna Cora Mowatt, Uncle Tom's Cabin by George Aiken, The Octoroon by Dion Boucicault
- Early American Writing
- Early Christian Lives: Life of Antony by Athanasius; Life of Paul of Thebes, Life of Hilarion and Life of Malchus by Jerome; Life of Martin of Tours by Sulpicius Severus; Life of Benedict by Gregory the Great
- Early Greek Philosophy
- The Early History of Rome (Books I-V) by Titus Livy
- Early Irish Myths and Sagas
- Early Socratic Dialogues: (Ion, Laches, Lysis, Charmides, Hippias Major, Hippias Minor, Euthydemus) by Plato
- Early Writings by Karl Marx
- East of Eden by John Steinbeck
- The Ecclesiastical History of the English People by Bede
- Ecce Homo by Friedrich Nietzsche
- Edgar Huntly by Charles Brockden Brown
- The Education of Henry Adams by Henry Adams
- Effi Briest by Theodor Fontane
- Egil's Saga
- Egyptian Book of the Dead, translated by E. A. Wallis Budge
- Eichmann in Jerusalem by Hannah Arendt^{3}
- Either/Or by Søren Kierkegaard
- Elective Affinities by Johann Wolfgang von Goethe
- Electra and Other Plays (Ajax, Women of Trachis, Philoctetes) by Sophocles
- The Emigrants by Gilbert Imlay
- Emma by Jane Austen^{4}
- The End of Nature by Bill McKibben
- The End of the Affair by Graham Greene
- England Made Me by Graham Greene
- English Romantic Verse
- The Enneads by Plotinus
- Ennui by Maria Edgeworth
- Enquiry Concerning Political Justice by William Godwin
- The Epic of Gilgamesh, prose translation
- The Epic of Gilgamesh, verse translation
- Erewhon by Samuel Butler
- The Erotic Poems (including Amores and Ars Amatoria) by Ovid
- An Essay Concerning Human Understanding by John Locke
- The Essays by Francis Bacon
- Essays by Michel de Montaigne
- Essays by Plutarch
- Essays and Aphorisms by Arthur Schopenhauer
- Essays in Idleness and Hojoki by Kenkō and Chōmei
- Esther by Henry Adams
- Ethan Frome by Edith Wharton
- Eugene Onegin by Alexander Pushkin
- Eugenie Grandet by Honoré de Balzac
- The Europeans by Henry James
- The Eustace Diamonds by Anthony Trollope
- Evelina by Frances Burney
- Exemplary Stories by Miguel de Cervantes
- The Exploration of the Colorado River and Its Canyons by John Wesley Powell

=== F ===
- The Fable of the Bees by Bernard Mandeville
- Facundo by Domingo F. Sarmiento
- The Faerie Queene by Edmund Spenser
- A Fairly Honourable Defeat by Iris Murdoch
- Fairy Tales by Hans Christian Andersen
- The Fall of the House of Usher and Other Writings by Edgar Allan Poe
- The Fall of the Roman Republic by Plutarch
- The Fallen Idol by Graham Greene
- Fanny Hill by John Cleland
- Fantômas by Marcel Allain and Pierre Souvestre
- Far from the Madding Crowd by Thomas Hardy
- Fasti by Ovid
- Father and Son by Edmund Gosse
- Fathers and Sons by Ivan Turgenev
- Faust, Part I by Johann Wolfgang von Goethe
- Faust, Part II by Johann Wolfgang von Goethe
- Fear and Trembling by Søren Kierkegaard
- The Federalist Papers by Alexander Hamilton, James Madison and John Jay
- Felix Holt, the Radical by George Eliot
- The Female Quixote by Charlotte Lennox
- The Fiddler of the Reels and Other Stories by Thomas Hardy
- The Figure in the Carpet and Other Stories by Henry James
- El Filibusterismo by José Rizal
- First Love by Ivan Turgenev
- The First Men in the Moon by H. G. Wells
- Five Italian Renaissance Comedies: The Mandragora by Niccolò Machiavelli, Lena by Ludovico Ariosto, The Stablemaster by Pietro Aretino, The Faithful Shepherd by Giovanni Guarini and The Deceived by "Gl'Intronati"
- Five Plays: (A Trick to Catch the Old One, A Chaste Maid in Cheapside, Women Beware Women, The Changeling, The Revenger's Tragedy) by Thomas Middleton
- Five-and-Twenty Tales of the Genie by Śivadāsa
- Flatland by Edwin A. Abbott
- Flaubert in Egypt by Gustave Flaubert
- Fools of Fortune by William Trevor
- The Forest of Thieves and The Magic Garden: An Anthology of Medieval Jain Stories
- Fortress Besieged by Qian Zhongshu
- Fortunata and Jacinta by Benito Pérez Galdós
- The Fortunes of Richard Mahony by Henry Handel Richardson
- Forty Stories by Donald Barthelme
- Four Comedies by Carlo Goldoni
- Four Russian Plays (The Infant by Denis Fonvizin, Chatsky by Alexander Griboyedov, The Inspector General by Nikolai Gogol, Thunder by Alexander Ostrovsky)
- Four Tragedies by Seneca
- The Four Voyages of Christopher Columbus
- Fourteen Byzantine Rulers (The Chronographia) by Michael Psellus
- The Fox, The Captain's Doll, The Ladybird by D. H. Lawrence
- Fragments by Heraclitus
- Fragments from My Diary by Maxim Gorky
- Framley Parsonage by Anthony Trollope
- Frankenstein by Mary Shelley
- The Frogs and Other Plays (The Wasps and The Poet and the Women) by Aristophanes
- From Here to Eternity by James Jones

=== G ===
- The Gambler, Bobok, A Nasty Story by Fyodor Dostoyevsky
- Gargantua and Pantagruel by François Rabelais
- Gentlemen Prefer Blondes by Anita Loos
- The Georgics by Virgil, translated by Kimberly Johnson
- Germania by Tacitus
- Germinie Lacerteux by Edmond and Jules de Goncourt
- Ghosts and Other Plays (A Public Enemy and When We Dead Wake) by Henrik Ibsen
- The Gift of the Magi by O. Henry
- The Gilded Age by Mark Twain
- The Girls' Guide to Hunting and Fishing by Melissa Bank
- Gisli Sursson's Saga and The Saga of the People of Eyri
- Glory by Vladimir Nabokov
- The God Boy by Ian Cross
- God's Trombones by James Weldon Johnson
- The Gods Will Have Blood by Anatole France
- Going to Meet the Man by James Baldwin
- The Golden Ass by Apuleius
- The Golden Bowl by Henry James
- The Golden Casket: Chinese Novellas of Two Millennia
- The Golden Legend: Selections by Jacobus de Voragine
- The Golovlyov Family by Mikhail Saltykov-Shchedrin
- The Good Apprentice by Iris Murdoch
- The Good Person of Szechwan by Bertolt Brecht
- The Good Soldier by Ford Madox Ford
- The Good Soldier Svejk and His Fortunes in the World War by Jaroslav Hašek
- Gorgias by Plato
- The Gospel of Wealth: Essays and Other Writings by Andrew Carnegie
- Gothic Tales by Elizabeth Gaskell
- Grace Abounding to the Chief of Sinners by John Bunyan
- The Grandissimes by George Washington Cable
- The Grapes of Wrath by John Steinbeck
- Gravity's Rainbow by Thomas Pynchon
- Great Expectations by Charles Dickens
- Greek Fiction (Chariton, Longus)
- Greek Political Oratory (Thucydides, Lysias, Andocides, Isocrates, Demosthenes)
- The Greek Sophists
- Grundrisse by Karl Marx
- The Guide by R. K. Narayan
- Guide to Greece: Volume 1, Central Greece by Pausanias
- Guide to Greece: Volume 2, Southern Greece by Pausanias
- Gulliver's Travels by Jonathan Swift^{3}
- Guy Mannering by Walter Scott
- Guys and Dolls and Other Writings by Damon Runyon

=== H ===
- The Hand of Ethelberta by Thomas Hardy
- Hard Times by Charles Dickens
- A Harlot High and Low by Honoré de Balzac
- Hashish by Henry de Monfreid
- The Haunted Dolls' House and Other Ghost Stories by M. R. James
- The Haunting of Hill House by Shirley Jackson
- A Hazard of New Fortunes by William Dean Howells
- He Knew He Was Right by Anthony Trollope
- Heart of Darkness by Joseph Conrad
- The Heart of the Matter by Graham Greene
- The Heart of Midlothian by Walter Scott
- Heartbreak House by George Bernard Shaw
- Heat Wave by Penelope Lively
- Hedda Gabler and Other Plays (The Wild Duck and The Pillars of the Community) by Henrik Ibsen
- Helena by Evelyn Waugh
- Henderson the Rain King by Saul Bellow
- The Heptameron by Marguerite de Navarre
- Her Lover by Albert Cohen
- Heracles and Other Plays by Euripides
- Herland, The Yellow Wallpaper, and Selected Writings by Charlotte Perkins Gilman
- A Hero of Our Time by Mikhail Lermontov
- Heroides by Ovid
- Herzog by Saul Bellow
- Hesiod (Theogony, Works and Days) and Theognis (Elegies)
- Hindu Myths
- Hippocratic Writings
- The Histories by Herodotus
- The Histories by Tacitus
- The History of Alexander by Quintus Curtius Rufus
- The History of the Church by Eusebius
- The History of Civilization in Europe by François Guizot
- The History of the Decline and Fall of the Roman Empire by Edward Gibbon
- The History of England (abridged) by Lord Macaulay
- A History of the Franks by Gregory of Tours
- The History of the Kings of Britain by Geoffrey of Monmouth translated by Lewis Thorpe
- The History of Mary Prince by Mary Prince
- The History of Mr Polly by H. G. Wells
- A History of My Times by Xenophon
- A History of New York by Washington Irving
- The History of the Peloponnesian War by Thucydides^{3}
- The History of Rasselas, Prince of Abissinia by Samuel Johnson
- History of the Thirteen: (Ferragus, The Duchess of Langeais, The Girl with the Golden Eyes) by Honoré de Balzac
- The History of Tom Jones by Henry Fielding
- The Hitopadeśa attributed to "Narayana"
- The Home and the World by Rabindranath Tagore
- Home of the Gentry by Ivan Turgenev
- Homeric Hymns by Homer
- Hope Leslie by Catharine Maria Sedgwick
- The Hound of the Baskervilles by Arthur Conan Doyle
- The Hour of the Star by Clarice Lispector
- The House of the Dead by Fyodor Dostoyevsky
- The House of Mirth by Edith Wharton
- The House of the Seven Gables by Nathaniel Hawthorne
- The House of Ulloa by Emilia Pardo Bazán
- The House with the Green Shutters by George Douglas Brown
- How Much Land Does a Man Need? and Other Stories by Leo Tolstoy
- How the Other Half Lives by Jacob A. Riis
- Howards End by E. M. Forster
- Hrafnkel's Saga and Other Icelandic Stories
- Humboldt's Gift by Saul Bellow
- Hunger by Knut Hamsun
- Hungry Hearts by Anzia Yezierska
- The Hunting of the Snark by Lewis Carroll

=== I ===
- I Never Promised You a Rose Garden by Joanne Greenberg
- I Paint What I Want to See by Philip Guston
- Ibn Fadlān and the Land of Darkness: Arab Travellers in the Far North by Ibn Fadlān
- Ice by Anna Kavan
- The Idiot by Fyodor Dostoyevsky
- Idylls of the King by Alfred Tennyson
- If Beale Street Could Talk by James Baldwin
- The Iliad by Homer
- The Imitation of Christ by Thomas à Kempis
- The Importance of Being Earnest and Other Plays by Oscar Wilde
- In Dubious Battle by John Steinbeck
- In the Land of Time, and Other Fantasy Tales by Lord Dunsany
- In Patagonia by Bruce Chatwin
- In Search of Lost Time: The Way by Swann's by Marcel Proust
- In Search of Lost Time: In the Shadow of Young Girls in Flower by Marcel Proust
- In Search of Lost Time: The Guernmantes Way by Marcel Proust
- In the South Seas by Robert Louis Stevenson
- Incidents in the Life of a Slave Girl by Harriet Jacobs
- Inferno and From an Occult Diary by August Strindberg
- The Inheritance by Louisa May Alcott
- The Inheritors by William Golding
- The Innocents Abroad by Mark Twain
- Into the War by Italo Calvino
- The Interesting Narrative and Other Writings by Olaudah Equiano
- Introductory Lectures on Aesthetics by Georg Wilhelm Friedrich Hegel
- The Invisible Man by H. G. Wells
- The Iron Heel by Jack London
- Iron in the Soul by Jean-Paul Sartre
- Islamic Mystical Poetry: Sufi Verse from the early Mystics to Rumi
- The Island of Dr. Moreau by H. G. Wells
- Israel Potter by Herman Melville
- Italian Folktales by Italo Calvino
- Italian Hours by Henry James
- Italian Journey by Johann Wolfgang von Goethe
- Ivanhoe by Walter Scott

=== J ===
- J R by William Gaddis
- Jacques the Fatalist and His Master by Denis Diderot
- The Jātakas: Birth Stories of the Bodhisatta
- Jane Eyre by Charlotte Brontë
- Japanese Nō Dramas
- Jean Santeuil by Marcel Proust
- The Jewish War by Flavius Josephus
- The Joke and Its Relation to the Unconscious by Sigmund Freud
- Joseph Andrews/Shamela by Henry Fielding
- The Journal by George Fox
- A Journal of the Plague Year by Daniel Defoe
- The Journal of a Tour to the Hebrides by Samuel Johnson
- Journals and Letters by Frances Burney
- The Journals of Captain Cook by James Cook
- The Journals of Lewis and Clark by Meriwether Lewis and William Clark
- The Journey Through Wales by Gerald of Wales
- A Journey to the Western Islands of Scotland by Samuel Johnson
- Journey Without Maps by Graham Greene
- Jude the Obscure by Thomas Hardy
- The Jugurthine War and The Conspiracy of Catiline by Sallust
- The Jungle by Upton Sinclair
- The Jungle Book by Rudyard Kipling
- Just-So Stories by Rudyard Kipling

=== K ===
- The Kabbalistic Tradition: An Anthology of Jewish Mysticism
- "Kallocain" by Karin Boye
- Kenilworth by Walter Scott
- Kidnapped by Robert Louis Stevenson
- Kim by Rudyard Kipling
- King Harald's Saga by Snorri Sturluson
- King Solomon's Mines by H. Rider Haggard
- Kipps by H. G. Wells
- The Knockout Artist by Harry Crews
- The Koran, translated by N. J. Dawood
- The Koran: With Parallel Arabic Text
- The Kreutzer Sonata and Other Stories by Leo Tolstoy
- Krishna: The Beautiful Legend of God (Śrīmad Bhāgavata Purāṇa Book X)
- Kristin Lavransdatter by Sigrid Undset
- Kristin Lavransdatter I: The Wreath by Sigrid Undset
- Kristin Lavransdatter II: The Wife by Sigrid Undset
- Kristin Lavransdatter III: The Cross by Sigrid Undset
- Kusamakura by Natsume Sōseki

=== L ===
- The Ladies of the Corridor by Dorothy Parker and Arnaud d'Usseau
- Lady Audley's Secret by Mary Elizabeth Braddon
- Lady Chatterley's Lover by D. H. Lawrence
- Lady Macbeth of Mtsensk and Other Stories by Nikolai Leskov
- Lady Susan, The Watsons, Sanditon by Jane Austen
- Lady with the Little Dog and Other Stories, 1896–1904 by Anton Chekhov
- The Lais of Marie de France by Marie de France
- A Laodicean by Thomas Hardy
- The Last Days of Socrates (Euthyphro, Apology, Crito, Phaedo) by Plato
- The Last Man by Mary Shelley
- The Last of the Mohicans by James Fenimore Cooper
- A Last Supper of Queer Apostles by Pedro Lemebel
- The Later Roman Empire by Ammianus Marcellinus
- The Law and the Lady by Wilkie Collins
- The Laws by Plato
- The Laws of Manu
- Laxdaela Saga
- Lazarillo de Tormes and The Swindler by Francisco de Quevedo: Two Spanish Picaresque Novels
- Leaves of Grass by Walt Whitman
- A Legacy by Sybille Bedford
- The Legend of Sleepy Hollow and Other Stories by Washington Irving
- Letters from an American Farmer by J. Hector St.John de Crèvecoeur
- Letters From My Windmill by Alphonse Daudet
- Letters From Russia by Astolphe de Custine
- Letters from a Stoic by Seneca
- The Letters of Abelard and Heloise by Peter Abelard
- The Letters of John and Abigail Adams by Abigail Adams and John Adams
- Letters of the Late Ignatius Sancho, an African by Ignatius Sancho
- The Letters of Vincent van Gogh
- The Letters of the Younger Pliny by Pliny the Younger
- Letters on England by Voltaire
- Letters to Father by Celeste Galilei
- Leviathan by Thomas Hobbes
- The Life and Adventures of Nicholas Nickleby by Charles Dickens
- The Life and Opinions of the Tomcat Murr by E. T. A. Hoffmann
- The Life and Opinions of Tristram Shandy, Gentleman by Laurence Sterne
- A Life in Letters by Anton Chekhov
- A Life in Letters by Henry James
- A Life in Letters by Wolfgang Amadeus Mozart
- A Life in Letters by William Wordsworth
- Life is a Dream by Pedro Calderón de la Barca
- Life of Apollonius by Philostratus
- Life of Black Hawk, or Mà-ka-tai-me-she-kià-kiàk by Black Hawk
- The Life of Charlotte Brontë by Elizabeth Gaskell
- Life of Galileo by Bertolt Brecht
- The Life of Henri Brulard by Stendhal
- The Life of Milarepa by Tsangnyön Heruka
- The Life of St. Columba by Adomnán of Iona
- The Life of Saint Teresa of Avila by Herself
- The Life of Samuel Johnson by James Boswell
- Life on the Mississippi by Mark Twain
- The Lifted Veil and Brother Jacob by George Eliot
- The Literature of Japanese American Incarceration edited by Edited by Frank Abe and Floyd Cheung.
- A Literary Review by Søren Kierkegaard
- The Little Demon by Fyodor Sologub
- Little Dorrit by Charles Dickens
- A Little Larger Than the Entire Universe by Fernando Pessoa
- A Little Learning by Evelyn Waugh
- Little Red Riding Hood, Cinderella, and Other Classic Fairy Tales by Charles Perrault
- Little Women by Louisa May Alcott
- Lives of the Artists (in two volumes) by Giorgio Vasari
- Lives of the Later Caesars
- Living My Life by Emma Goldman
- London Labour and the London Poor by Henry Mayhew
- The Log from the Sea of Cortez by John Steinbeck
- The Log of a Cowboy by Andy Adams
- Lolly Willowes by Sylvia Townsend Warner
- The Long Valley by John Steinbeck
- The Longest Journey by E. M. Forster
- Looking Backward by Edward Bellamy
- Lord Jim by Joseph Conrad
- Lorna Doone by R. D. Blackmore
- The Loss of the Ship Essex, Sunk by a Whale by Thomas Nickerson and Owen Chase
- The Lost Estate (Le Grand Meaulnes) by Alain-Fournier
- The Lost Honour of Katharina Blum by Heinrich Böll
- Lost Illusions by Honoré de Balzac
- The Lost World and Other Thrilling Tales by Arthur Conan Doyle
- Love and Mr. Lewisham by H. G. Wells
- Love (De L'Amour) by Stendhal
- Love and Friendship: And Other Youthful Writings by Jane Austen
- Love Visions: The Book of the Duchess; The House of Fame; The Parliament of Birds; The Legend of Good Women by Geoffrey Chaucer
- Love-Letters Between a Nobleman and His Sister by Aphra Behn
- Loving/Living/Party Going by Henry Green
- The Luck of Roaring Camp and Other Writings by Bret Harte
- The Lusiads by Luís Vaz de Camõens
- Lysistrata and Other Plays (The Acharnians and The Clouds) by Aristophanes

=== M ===
- The Mabinogion
- Madame Bovary by Gustave Flaubert
- Mademoiselle de Maupin by Théophile Gautier
- Maggie: A Girl of the Streets by Stephen Crane
- The Mahābhārata (abridged)
- The Maias by Eça de Queiroz
- Main Street by Sinclair Lewis
- Major Barbara by George Bernard Shaw
- The Major Works by Sir Thomas Browne
- Makers of Rome by Plutarch
- Maldoror and Poems by Lautréamont
- Malgudi Days by R. K. Narayan
- MAMista by Len Deighton
- Man and Superman by George Bernard Shaw
- The Man in the Iron Mask by Alexandre Dumas
- The Man Who Had All the Luck by Arthur Miller
- The Man Within by Graham Greene
- The Man-Eater of Malgudi by R. K. Narayan
- Manon Lescaut by Abbé Prévost
- Mansfield Park by Jane Austen
- The Manticore by Robertson Davies
- The Manifesto of the Communist Party by Karl Marx and Friedrich Engels
- The Manuscript Found in Saragossa by Jan Potocki
- The Marble Faun by Nathaniel Hawthorne
- Mardi by Herman Melville
- Marius the Epicurean by Walter Pater
- The Mark of Zorro by Johnston McCulley
- The Marquise of O-- and Other Stories by Heinrich von Kleist
- The Marriage of Figaro by Pierre Beaumarchais
- The Marsh Arabs by Wilfred Thesiger
- Martin Chuzzlewit by Charles Dickens
- Martin Eden by Jack London
- The Martyred by Richard E. Kim
- Mary and Maria by Mary Wollstonecraft/Matilda by Mary Shelley (in one volume)
- Mary Barton by Elizabeth Gaskell
- The Masque of the Red Death by Edgar Allan Poe
- Master and Man and Other Stories by Leo Tolstoy
- The Master and Margarita by Mikhail Bulgakov
- The Master Builder and Other Plays (Rosmersholm, Little Eyolf and John Gabriel Borkman) by Henrik Ibsen
- The Master of Ballantrae by Robert Louis Stevenson
- Maurice by E. M. Forster
- Maxims by La Rochefoucauld
- Maxims and Reflections by Johann Wolfgang von Goethe
- The Mayflower Papers (including Of Plymouth Plantation by William Bradford)
- The Mayor of Casterbridge by Thomas Hardy
- McTeague by Frank Norris
- Medea and Other Plays (Hecabe, Electra, Heracles) by Euripides
- Meditations by Marcus Aurelius
- Meditations and Other Metaphysical Writings by René Descartes
- Medieval Writings on Female Spirituality
- Melmoth the Wanderer by Charles Robert Maturin
- Memoirs by Philippe de Commynes
- Memoirs by William Tecumseh Sherman
- Memoirs of My Life by Edward Gibbon
- The Memoirs of Sherlock Holmes by Arthur Conan Doyle
- The Memorial Feast for Kökötöy Khan by Sagymbaĭ Orozbak uulu
- Mencius by Mencius
- "Merits of the Plague" by Ibn Hajar al-'Asqalani
- Metamorphoses by Ovid
- The Metaphysical Poets
- The Metaphysics by Aristotle
- Michel the Giant by Tété-Michel Kpomassie
- Micromegas and Other Short Fictions by Voltaire
- Middlemarch by George Eliot
- A Midsummer Night's Dream by William Shakespeare
- The Mill on the Floss by George Eliot
- The Minister's Wooing by Harriet Beecher Stowe
- Minor Notes, Volume 1; Minor Notes, Volume 2 by George Moses Horton, Fenton Johnson, and Georgia Douglas Johnson
- The Misanthrope and Other Plays (Such Preposterously Precious Ladies, Tartuffe, A Doctor Despite Himself, The Would-be Gentleman, Those Learned Ladies) by Jean-Baptiste Molière
- "The Mis-Education of the Negro" by Carter G. Woodson
- The Miser and Other Plays (The School for Wives, The School for Wives Criticized, Don Juan, The Hypochondriac) by Jean-Baptiste Molière
- Les Misérables by Victor Hugo
- Miss Ravenel's Conversion from Secession to Loyalty by John William De Forest
- Mr. Sammler's Planet by Saul Bellow
- Moby-Dick by Herman Melville
- A Modern Instance by William Dean Howells
- A Modern Utopia by H. G. Wells
- A Modest Proposal and Other Writings by Jonathan Swift
- Moll Flanders by Daniel Defoe
- The Monk by Matthew Lewis
- Monkey King: Journey to the West by Wu Cheng’en
- Mont Saint-Michel and Chartres by Henry Adams
- A Month in the Country by Ivan Turgenev
- The Moon and Sixpence by W. Somerset Maugham
- The Moon Is Down by John Steinbeck
- The Moonstone by Wilkie Collins
- More Die of Heartbreak by Saul Bellow
- The Morgesons by Elizabeth Stoddard
- Le Morte d'Arthur (in two volumes) by Thomas Malory
- Mother Courage and Her Children by Bertolt Brecht
- The Mountains of California by John Muir
- Mozart's Journey to Prague and a Selection of Poems by Eduard Mörike
- Mrs Craddock by W. Somerset Maugham
- A Murder of Quality by John le Carré
- Murder Trials by Marcus Tullius Cicero
- The Murderer by Roy Heath
- My Bondage and My Freedom by Frederick Douglass
- My Brilliant Career by Miles Franklin
- My Childhood, My Apprenticeship and My Universities by Maxim Gorky
- Mysteries by Knut Hamsun
- The Mysteries of Udolpho by Ann Radcliffe
- The Mystery of Edwin Drood by Charles Dickens

=== N ===
- The Naked Civil Servant by Quentin Crisp
- Nana by Émile Zola
- The Narrative of Arthur Gordon Pym of Nantucket by Edgar Allan Poe^{4}
- Narrative of the Life of Frederick Douglass, an American Slave by Frederick Douglass
- Narrative of Sojourner Truth by Sojourner Truth
- The Narrow Road to the Deep North and Other Travel Sketches by Matsuo Bashō
- A Nation of Women by Luisa Capetillo
- Natural History: A Selection by Pliny the Elder
- Nature and Selected Essays by Ralph Waldo Emerson
- The Nature of the Gods by Marcus Tullius Cicero
- Nineteen Eighty-Four by George Orwell
- The Need for Roots by Simone Weil
- Netochka Nezvanova by Fyodor Dostoyevsky
- The New Atalantis by Delarivier Manley
- A New England Nun by Mary Eleanor Wilkins Freeman
- A New-England Tale by Catharine Maria Sedgwick
- The New Machiavelli by H. G. Wells
- New Science by Giambattista Vico
- A New View of Society and Other Writings by Robert Owen
- News from Nowhere and Other Writings by William Morris
- The Nibelungenlied
- The Nicomachean Ethics by Aristotle
- Niels Lyhne by Jens Peter Jacobsen
- A Nietzsche Reader by Friedrich Nietzsche
- The Nigger of the Narcissus by Joseph Conrad
- A Night in Acadie by Kate Chopin
- Nights with Uncle Remus by Joel Chandler Harris
- Nineteenth-Century American Poetry
- Njal's Saga
- No Name by Wilkie Collins
- Nobody Knows My Name by James Baldwin
- Noli Me Tangere by José Rizal
- North American Indians by George Catlin
- North and South by Elizabeth Gaskell
- Northanger Abbey by Jane Austen
- Northland Stories by Jack London
- Nostromo by Joseph Conrad
- The Notebooks of Malte Laurids Brigge by Rainer Maria Rilke
- Notes from Underground, The Double: A Petersburg Poem by Fyodor Dostoyevsky
- Notes on the State of Virginia by Thomas Jefferson
- Notre-Dame of Paris by Victor Hugo

=== O ===
- O Pioneers! by Willa Cather
- The Obedience of a Christian Man by William Tyndale
- Oblomov by Ivan Goncharov
- Octavia by Seneca
- The Octopus by Frank Norris
- The Odd Women by George Gissing
- The Odyssey by Homer
- Of Ghosts and Goblins by Lafcadio Hearn
- Of Human Bondage by W. Somerset Maugham
- Of Mice and Men by John Steinbeck
- Oil! by Upton Sinclair
- The Old Curiosity Shop by Charles Dickens
- Old Goriot by Honoré de Balzac
- The Old Wives' Tale by Arnold Bennett
- Oliver Twist by Charles Dickens
- Omoo by Herman Melville
- On the Good Life (including The Dream of Scipio) by Marcus Tullius Cicero
- On Government by Marcus Tullius Cicero
- On Liberty by John Stuart Mill
- On Love and Barley: Haiku by Matsuo Bashō
- On Mysticism by Jorge Luis Borges
- On the Nature of the Universe by Lucretius
- On Painting by Leon Battista Alberti
- On Revolution by Hannah Arendt
- On the Road by Jack Kerouac
- On Suicide by Émile Durkheim
- On to the Alamo by Richard Penn Smith
- On War by Karl Von Clausewitz
- Once There Was A War by John Steinbeck
- One Flew Over the Cuckoo's Nest by Ken Kesey
- Only When I Larf by Len Deighton
- The Ordeal of Richard Feverel by George Meredith
- The Oregon Trail by Francis Parkman
- The Oresteia: Agamemnon, The Libation Bearers, The Eumenides by Aeschylus
- Orestes and Other Plays (The Children of Heracles, Andromache, The Suppliant Women, The Phoenician Women, Iphigenia in Aulis) by Euripides
- An Organizer's Tale: Speeches by César Chávez
- Orient Express by Graham Greene
- The Origin of the Family, Private Property and the State by Friedrich Engels
- The Origin of Species by Charles Darwin
- Orkneyinga Saga
- Orlando Furioso (in two volumes) by Ludovico Ariosto
- Oroonoko, The Rover, and Other Works by Aphra Behn
- Our Man in Havana by Graham Greene
- Our Mutual Friend by Charles Dickens
- Our Nig by Harriet E. Wilson

=== P – Q ===
- The Painter of Signs by R. K. Narayan
- A Pair of Blue Eyes by Thomas Hardy
- Pamela by Samuel Richardson
- Pan by Knut Hamsun
- The Pañcatantra by Viśnu Sarma
- Parade's End by Ford Madox Ford
- Paradise Lost by John Milton
- A Parisian Affair and Other Stories by Guy de Maupassant
- Parzival by Wolfram Von Eschenbach
- A Passage to India by E. M. Forster
- Passing by Nella Larsen
- The Pastures of Heaven by John Steinbeck
- Patañjali's Yoga Sūtra
- The Pathfinder by James Fenimore Cooper
- Paul and Virginia by Bernardin de Saint-Pierre
- The Pearl by John Steinbeck
- Peer Gynt by Henrik Ibsen
- The Penguin Book of Demons
- The Penguin Book of First World War Poetry
- The Penguin Book of French Poetry
- The Penguin Book of Mermaids
- The Penguin Book of Pirates
- The Penguin Book of Renaissance Verse
- The Penguin Book of Victorian Verse
- The Penguin Book of Witches
- Penrod by Booth Tarkington
- Pensées by Blaise Pascal
- The People Opposite by Georges Simenon
- A Persian Expedition by Xenophon
- The Persian Letters by Montesquieu
- Personal Memoirs by Ulysses S. Grant
- Personal Narrative of a Journey to the Equinoctial Regions of the New Continent by Alexander von Humboldt
- Personal Writings by Ignatius of Loyola
- Persuasion by Jane Austen
- Petals of Blood by Ngũgĩ wa Thiong'o
- Peter Pan: Peter and Wendy and Peter Pan in Kensington Gardens by J. M. Barrie
- Petersburg by Andrei Bely
- Phaedrus and Letters VII and VIII by Plato
- Philebus by Plato
- Philosophical Dictionary by François Voltaire
- A Philosophical Enquiry into the Origin of Our Ideas of the Sublime and Beautiful by Edmund Burke
- Phineas Redux by Anthony Trollope
- The Physiology of Taste by Jean-Anthelme Brillat-Savarin
- The Pickwick Papers by Charles Dickens
- The Picture of Dorian Gray by Oscar Wilde
- Pictures from Italy by Charles Dickens
- Pierre: or, The Ambiguities by Herman Melville
- Pierre and Jean by Guy de Maupassant
- Piers the Ploughman by William Langland
- The Pilgrim's Progress by John Bunyan
- The Pillow Book of Sei Shōnagon
- Pinocchio: The Tale of a Puppet by Carlo Collodi
- The Pioneers by James Fenimore Cooper
- The Pit by Frank Norris
- Plays by Anton Chekhov
- Plays and Fragments by Menander (earlier edition includes Characters by Theophrastus)
- Plays Pleasant: (Arms and the Man, Candida, The Man of Destiny and You Never Can Tell) by George Bernard Shaw
- Plays Unpleasant: (Widowers' Houses, The Philanderer and Mrs. Warren's Profession) by George Bernard Shaw
- Plutarch on Sparta by Plutarch
- Poems by Li Po
- Poems by Wang Wei
- Poems and Ballads by Algernon Charles Swinburne
- Poems and Prose by Gerard Manley Hopkins
- Poems, Protest, and a Dream by Sor Juana Inés de la Cruz
- Poetics by Aristotle
- The Politics by Aristotle
- Polyeuctus, The Liar, Nicomedia by Pierre Corneille
- Poor Folk and Other Stories by Fyodor Dostoyevsky
- The Portable Abraham Lincoln
- The Portable Anna Julia Cooper
- The Portable Arthur Miller
- The Portable Beat Reader
- The Portable Charles W. Chesnutt
- The Portable Dante
- The Portable Edith Wharton
- The Portable Edgar Allan Poe
- The Portable Faulkner
- The Portable Graham Greene
- The Portable Hannah Arendt
- The Portable Henry James
- The Portable John Adams
- The Portable Mark Twain
- The Portable Nietzsche
- The Portable Nineteenth-Century African American Women Writers
- The Portable Sixties Reader
- The Portable Thoreau
- The Portable Twentieth-Century Russian Reader
- The Portable Walt Whitman
- A Portrait of the Artist as a Young Man by James Joyce
- The Portrait of a Lady by Henry James
- The Pot of Gold and Other Plays (The Prisoners, The Brothers Menaechmus, The Swaggering Soldier, Pseudolus) by Plautus
- The Power and the Glory by Graham Greene
- The Power of Sympathy by William Hill Brown/The Coquette by Hannah Webster Foster (in one volume)
- Pragmatism and Other Writings by William James
- The Prairie by James Fenimore Cooper
- Praise of Folly by Desiderius Erasmus
- Pride and Prejudice by Jane Austen
- The Prime Minister by Anthony Trollope
- The Prince by Niccolò Machiavelli
- A Prince of Swindlers by Guy Boothby
- The Prince and the Pauper by Mark Twain
- The Princess Casamassima by Henry James
- La Princesse de Clèves by Madame de Lafayette
- A Princess of Mars by Edgar Rice Burroughs
- Principles of Geology by Charles Lyell
- Principles of Human Knowledge and Three Dialogues by George Berkeley
- The Prisoner of Zenda by Anthony Hope
- The Private Journal of William Reynolds by William Reynolds
- The Private Memoirs and Confessions of a Justified Sinner by James Hogg
- The Professor by Charlotte Brontë
- Prometheus Bound and Other Plays (The Suppliants, Seven Against Thebes, The Persians) by Aeschylus
- Protagoras and Meno by Plato
- The Psychopathology of Everyday Life by Sigmund Freud
- Pudd'nhead Wilson by Mark Twain
- The Apocolocyntosis by Petronius and Seneca
- The Pursuit of the Well-Beloved by Thomas Hardy
- Pygmalion by George Bernard Shaw
- Quaker Writings: An Anthology, 1650-1920
- The Queen of Spades and Other Stories by Alexander Pushkin
- The Quest of the Holy Grail
- The Quiet American by Graham Greene

=== R ===
- Raffles: The Amateur Cracksman by E. W. Hornung
- Ragged Dick by Horatio Alger Jr.
- The Rainbow by D. H. Lawrence
- Rama the Steadfast by Valmiki
- The Ramayana: A Shortened Modern Prose Version by R. K. Narayan
- Rameau's Nephew by Denis Diderot
- Rashōmon and Seventeen Other Stories by Ryunosuke Akutagawa
- Ravelstein by Saul Bellow
- Rebecca of Sunnybrook Farm by Kate Douglas Wiggin^{3}
- The Recognitions by William Gaddis
- The Red and the Black by Stendhal
- The Red Badge of Courage and Other Stories by Stephen Crane
- The Red Pony by John Steinbeck
- Redburn by Herman Melville
- Reflections on the Revolution in France by Edmund Burke
- La Regenta by Leopoldo Alas
- Relativity: The Special and the General Theory by Albert Einstein
- Renaissance Women Poets
- The Republic by Plato
- Resurrection by Leo Tolstoy
- The Return of the Native by Thomas Hardy
- Revelations of Divine Love by Julian of Norwich
- Reveries of the Solitary Walker by Jean-Jacques Rousseau
- Riders of the Purple Sage by Zane Grey
- The Rig Veda
- Rights of Man by Thomas Paine
- The Rise and Fall of Athens by Plutarch
- The Rise of the Roman Empire by Polybius
- Rob Roy by Walter Scott
- The Robbers and Wallenstein by Friedrich Schiller
- Robinson Crusoe by Daniel Defoe
- Roderick Hudson by Henry James
- The Roman History: The Reign of Augustus by Cassius Dio
- The Romance of Tristan by Beroul
- Romance in Marseille by Claude McKay
- The Romance of the Three Kingdoms by Luo Guanzhong
- Romantic Fairy Tales
- Rome and Italy (Books VI-X) by Titus Livy
- Rome and the Mediterranean (Books XXXI-XLV) by Titus Livy
- Romola by George Eliot
- A Room of One's Own by Virginia Woolf
- A Room with a View by E. M. Forster
- The Roots of Ayurveda
- The Roots of Vedānta: Selections from Śaṅkara's Writings
- Rostam: Tales of Love and War from the Shahnameh by Abolqasem Ferdowsi
- The Rope and Other Plays (The Ghost, A Three-Dollar Day, Amphitryo) by Plautus
- Roughing It by Mark Twain
- Roxana, Or The Fortunate Mistress by Daniel Defoe
- The Ruba'iyat of Omar Khayyam by Omar Khayyam
- Rudin by Ivan Turgenev
- The Rule of St Benedict
- Rumpole's Return by John Mortimer
- Rupert of Hentzau by Anthony Hope
- R.U.R. by Karel Čapek
- A Russian Journal by John Steinbeck
- Russian Thinkers by Isaiah Berlin
- Ruth Hall by Fanny Fern

=== S ===
- The Saga of Grettir the Strong
- The Saga of the People of Laxardal and Bolli Bollason's Tale
- The Saga of the Volsungs
- Sagas of Warrior-Poets (Kormak's Saga, The Saga of Hallfred Troublesome-Poet, The Saga of Gunnlaug Serpent-Tongue, The Saga of Bjorn, Champion of the Hitardal People and Viglund's Saga)
- Sailing Alone Around the World by Joshua Slocum
- Saint Joan by George Bernard Shaw
- Salammbô by Gustave Flaubert
- Sanshirō by Natsume Sōseki
- Satires and Epistles by Persius and Satires by Horace
- Satirical Sketches by Lucian
- The Satyricon by Petronius and Seneca
- The Savoy Operas: The Complete Gilbert and Sullivan
- The Scarlet Letter by Nathaniel Hawthorne
- Scenes of Clerical Life by George Eliot
- The School for Scandal and Other Plays by Richard Brinsley Sheridan
- The Schreber Case by Sigmund Freud
- The Science Fiction of Edgar Allan Poe
- Sea and Sardinia by D. H. Lawrence
- The Sea, The Sea by Iris Murdoch
- The Sebastopol Sketches by Leo Tolstoy
- The Secret Agent by Joseph Conrad
- The Secret Garden by Frances Hodgson Burnett
- The Secret History by Procopius
- "The Secret History of the Mongols"
- Seize the Day by Saul Bellow
- Selected Essays by Samuel Johnson
- Selected Fables by Jean de La Fontaine
- Selected Journalism: 1850–1870 by Charles Dickens
- Selected Letters by Pietro Aretino
- Selected Letters by Lady Mary Wortley Montagu
- Selected Letters by Madame de Sévigné
- Selected Poems by Charles Baudelaire
- Selected Poems by D. H. Lawrence
- Selected Poems by Robert Browning
- Selected Poems by Robert Burns
- Selected Poems by Lord Byron
- Selected Poems by John Clare
- Selected Poems by Austin Clarke
- Selected Poems by Samuel Taylor Coleridge
- Selected Poems by John Dryden
- Selected Poems by Paul Laurence Dunbar
- Selected Poems by Thomas Hardy
- Selected Poems by Victor Hugo
- Selected Poems by Patrick Kavanagh
- Selected Poems by John Keats
- Selected Poems by Jules Laforgue
- Selected Poems by Henry Wadsworth Longfellow
- Selected Poems and Letters by Michelangelo
- Selected Poems by Pierre Ronsard
- Selected Poems by Percy Bysshe Shelley
- Selected Poems by Robert Louis Stevenson
- Selected Poems by Rabindranath Tagore
- Selected Poems by Alfred Tennyson
- Selected Poems by William Wordsworth
- Selected Poems and Prose by Percy Shelley
- Selected Poems and Fragments by Friedrich Hölderlin
- Selected Political Speeches by Marcus Tullius Cicero
- Selected Prose by Matthew Arnold
- Selected Prose by John Donne
- Selected Prose by Heinrich Heine
- Selected Prose by Charles Lamb
- Selected Short Stories by Honoré de Balzac
- Selected Short Stories by Rabindranath Tagore
- Selected Stories by D. H. Lawrence
- Selected Stories by E. M. Forster
- Selected Tales by Jacob and Wilhelm Grimm
- Selected Tales by Henry James
- Selected Tales and Sketches by Nathaniel Hawthorne
- Selected Verse by Johann Wolfgang von Goethe
- Selected Works by Marcus Tullius Cicero
- Selected Works by John Wilmot, Earl of Rochester
- Selected Writings by Thomas Aquinas
- Selected Writings by Rubén Darío
- Selected Writings by Gérard de Nerval
- Selected Writings by Meister Eckhart
- Selected Writings by William Hazlitt
- Selected Writings by Samuel Johnson
- Selected Writings by José Martí
- Selected Writings by Sir Walter Raleigh
- Sense and Sensibility by Jane Austen
- Sentimental Education by Gustave Flaubert
- A Sentimental Journey by Laurence Sterne
- Servitude and Grandeur of Arms by Alfred de Vigny
- Seven Viking Romances (Arrow-Odd, King Gautrek, Halfdan Eysteinsson, Bosi and Herraud, Egil and Asmund, Thorstein Mansion-Might and Helgi Thorisson)
- The Shadow-Line by Joseph Conrad
- Shahnameh: The Persian Book of Kings by Abolqasem Ferdowsi
- The Shape of Things to Come by H.G. Wells
- The Shattered Thigh and Other Plays by Bhāsa
- She by H. Rider Haggard
- Shirley by Charlotte Brontë
- The Shooting Party by Anton Chekhov
- A Short Account of the Destruction of the Indies by Bartolomé de Las Casas
- A Short History of the World by H. G. Wells^{3}
- The Short Reign of Pippin IV by John Steinbeck
- The Shorter Poems by Edmund Spenser
- Sickness unto Death by Søren Kierkegaard
- Sidney's the Defence of Poesy and Selected Renaissance Literary Criticism
- The Sign of Four by Arthur Conan Doyle
- Silas Marner by George Eliot
- Silent Spring by Rachel Carson
- Simhāsana Dvātrimśikā: Thirty-Two Tales of the Throne of Vikramaditya
- Sir Gawain and the Green Knight
- Sister Carrie by Theodore Dreiser
- Six Records of a Floating Life by Shen Fu
- Six Yüan Plays (The Orphan of Zhao, The Soul of Ch'ien-nü Leaves Her Body, The Injustice Done to Tou Ngo, Chang Boils the Sea, Autumn in Han Palace, A Stratagem of Interlocking Rings)
- Sixteen Satires by Juvenal
- Sixty Stories by Donald Barthelme
- Sketches by Boz by Charles Dickens
- Sketches from a Hunter's Album by Ivan Turgenev
- Slaughterhouse 5 by Kurt Vonnegut
- The Sleeper Awakes by H. G. Wells
- The Small House at Allington by Anthony Trollope
- A Small Town in Germany by John le Carré
- The Snow Leopard by Peter Matthiessen
- The Social Contract by Jean-Jacques Rousseau
- Something of Myself by Rudyard Kipling
- Sometimes a Great Notion by Ken Kesey
- Song of the Cid: Dual-Language Edition with Parallel Text
- The Song of Roland
- The Songs of the South: An Anthology of Ancient Chinese Poems by Qu Yuan and Other Poets
- Sons and Lovers by D. H. Lawrence
- The Sorrows of Young Werther by Johann Wolfgang von Goethe
- The Soul of Man Under Socialism and Selected Critical Prose by Oscar Wilde
- The Souls of Black Folk by W. E. B. Du Bois
- South: The Endurance Expedition by Ernest Shackleton
- Spain, Take This Chalice from Me and Other Poems by Cesar Vallejo
- Speaking of Śiva
- Spiritual Verses by Rumi
- The Spoils of Poynton by Henry James
- Spoon River Anthology by Edgar Lee Masters
- Spring Torrents by Ivan Turgenev
- The Spy by James Fenimore Cooper
- The Star-Child by Oscar Wilde
- The State and Revolution by V. I. Lenin
- Steal This Book by Abbie Hoffman
- The Stonewall Reader
- The Storm by Daniel Defoe
- Storm of Steel by Ernst Jünger
- The Story of an African Farm by Olive Schreiner
- The Story of Gösta Berling by Selma Lagerlöf
- The Story of Hong Gildong by Heo Gyun
- The Story of My Life by Giacomo Casanova
- The Story of the Stone, vol.1: The Golden Days by Cao Xueqin
- The Story of the Stone, vol.2: The Crab-Flower Club by Cao Xueqin
- The Story of the Stone, vol.3: The Warning Voice by Cao Xueqin
- The Story of the Stone, vol.4: The Debt of Tears by Cao Xueqin and Gao E
- The Story of the Stone, vol.5: The Dreamer Wakes by Cao Xueqin and Gao E
- The Strange Adventures of Mr. Andrew Hawthorn and Other Stories by John Buchan
- The Strange Case of Dr. Jekyll and Mr. Hyde and Other Tales of Terror by Robert Louis Stevenson
- Strange Tales From a Chinese Studio by Pu Songling
- Street Haunting by Virginia Woolf
- The Street of Crocodiles by Bruno Schulz
- Struggles and Triumphs by P. T. Barnum
- Struggling Upward by Horatio Alger Jr.
- Studies on Hysteria by Sigmund Freud
- A Study in Scarlet by Arthur Conan Doyle
- Subhashitavali: An Anthology of Comic, Erotic, and Other Verse
- Summer by Edith Wharton
- Sunjata by Bamba Suso and Banna Kanute
- Sunset Song by Lewis Grassic Gibbon
- Sweet Thursday by John Steinbeck
- The Swiss Family Robinson by Johann Wyss
- Symposium by Plato

=== T ===
- Ta Hsüeh
- The Táin, translated by Ciarán Carson
- A Tale of Two Cities by Charles Dickens
- A Tale Unasked (Towazugatari) by Lady Nijo
- The Tale of Four Dervishes by Mir Amman
- The Tale of Genji by Murasaki Shikibu
- The Tale of the Heike translated by Royall Tyler
- The Tale of Princess Fatima, Warrior Woman
- Tales From the Kathāsaritsāgara by Somadeva
- Tales from the Thousand and One Nights
- Tales of Belkin and Other Prose Writings by Alexander Pushkin
- The Cosmography and Geography of Africa by Johannes Leo Africanus
- Tales of the Greek Heroes by Roger Lancelyn Green
- Tales of Hoffmann by E. T. A. Hoffmann
- Tales of Soldiers and Civilians by Ambrose Bierce
- Tales, Speeches, Essays, and Sketches by Mark Twain
- Talkative Man by R. K. Narayan
- The Talmud: A Selection
- Tao Te Ching by Lao Tzu
- A Taste of Power by Elaine Brown
- Ten Days that Shook the World by John Reed
- The Tenant of Wildfell Hall by Anne Brontë
- Tess of the D'Urbervilles by Thomas Hardy
- Testament of Youth by Vera Brittain
- A Texas Cowboy by Charles A. Siringo
- Theaetetus by Plato
- Thérèse Raquin by Émile Zola
- The Case of Lizzie Borden and Other Writings by Elizabeth Garver Jordan
- The Castle by Franz Kafka
- The Dawn of Modern Cosmology
- The Knockout Artist by Harry Crews
- The Thing on the Doorstep and Other Weird Stories by H. P. Lovecraft
- The Third Man by Graham Greene
- The Thirty-Nine Steps by John Buchan
- Thirty-Two Tales of the Throne of Vikramaditya by Simhāsana Dvātriṃśikā
- The Thomas Paine Reader
- Thoughts and Sentiments on the Evil of Slavery by Quobna Ottobah Cugoano
- Thoughts from the Ice-Drinker's Studio by Liang Qichao
- The Three-Cornered Hat and Other Stories by Pedro Antonio de Alarcón
- Three Men in a Boat by Jerome K. Jerome
- Three Men on the Bummel by Jerome K. Jerome
- The Three Musketeers by Alexandre Dumas
- Three Plays: (The Father, Miss Julie, Easter) by August Strindberg
- Three Plays for Puritans (The Devil's Disciple, Caesar and Cleopatra, Captain Brassbound's Conversion) by George Bernard Shaw, with a long preface by the author
- Three Sanskrit Plays (Śakuntalā by Kālidāsa, Rākshasa's Ring by Viśākhadatta, Mālatī and Mādhava by Bhavabhūti)
- Three Soldiers by John Dos Passos
- Three Tales by Gustave Flaubert
- The Three Theban Plays: (Antigone, Oedipus the King, Oedipus at Colonus) by Sophocles
- The Threepenny Opera by Bertolt Brecht
- Through the Looking-Glass by Lewis Carroll
- Thus Spoke Zarathustra by Friedrich Nietzsche
- Tibetan Book of the Dead
- A Tiger for Malgudi by R. K. Narayan
- Timaeus by Plato
- The Time Machine by H. G. Wells
- To a God Unknown by John Steinbeck
- To the Lighthouse by Virginia Woolf
- To Jerusalem and Back by Saul Bellow
- Tono-Bungay by H. G. Wells
- Tortilla Flat by John Steinbeck
- A Tourist in Africa by Evelyn Waugh
- A Tramp Abroad by Mark Twain
- The Travels by Marco Polo
- The Travels of Sir John Mandeville
- Travels with Charley by John Steinbeck
- Travels with a Donkey in the Cévennes by Robert Louis Stevenson
- Travels with My Aunt by Graham Greene
- The Treasure Chest by Johann Peter Hebel
- Treasure Island by Robert Louis Stevenson
- The Treasure of the City of Ladies by Christine de Pizan
- The Trial by Franz Kafka
- Tristan by Gottfried von Strassburg
- Troilus and Criseyde by Geoffrey Chaucer
- The Turn of the Screw by Henry James
- Twelve Angry Men by Reginald Rose
- Twelve Years a Slave by Solomon Northup
- The Twelve Caesars by Suetonius
- Twenty Love Poems and a Song of Despair by Pablo Neruda
- The Twilight of the Idols by Friedrich Nietzsche
- Two Lives of Charlemagne by Einhard (Vita Karoli Magni) and Notker the Stammerer (De Carolo Magno)
- The Woman Who Had Two Navels and Tales of the Tropical Gothic by Nick Joaquin
- Two on a Tower by Thomas Hardy
- Two Years Before the Mast by Richard Henry Dana Jr.
- Typee by Herman Melville
- Typhoon and Other Stories by Joseph Conrad

=== U – V ===
- The Uncanny by Sigmund Freud
- Uncle Remus by Joel Chandler Harris
- Uncle Silas by Joseph Sheridan Le Fanu
- Uncle Tom's Cabin by Harriet Beecher Stowe
- Under the Banyan Tree by R. K. Narayan
- Under Fire by Henri Barbusse
- Under the Greenwood Tree by Thomas Hardy
- Under the Sea Wind by Rachel Carson
- Under Western Eyes by Joseph Conrad
- The Underdogs by Mariano Azuela
- The Unfortunate Traveller and Other Works by Thomas Nashe
- A Universal History of Iniquity by Jorge Luis Borges
- Unto This Last and Other Writings by John Ruskin
- Untouchable by Mulk Raj Anand
- Up From the Country, Infidelities, The Game of Love and Chance by Pierre de Marivaux
- Up from Slavery by Booker T. Washington
- The Upanishads
- Utilitarianism and Other Essays by John Stuart Mill
- Utopia by Thomas More
- The Valley of Fear and Selected Stories by Arthur Conan Doyle^{3}
- Vanity Fair by William Makepeace Thackeray
- The Varieties of Religious Experience by William James
- Vathek and Other Stories by William Beckford
- The Vendor of Sweets by R. K. Narayan
- The Venice Train by Georges Simenon
- Venus in Furs by Leopold von Sacher-Masoch
- The Vicar of Wakefield by Oliver Goldsmith
- The Victim by Saul Bellow
- Victory by Joseph Conrad
- The Village of Stepanchikovo by Fyodor Dostoyevsky
- Villette by Charlotte Brontë
- A Vindication of the Rights of Woman by Mary Wollstonecraft
- The Vinland Sagas
- Vineland by Thomas Pynchon
- Violent Ward by Len Deighton
- Virginia by Ellen Glasgow
- The Virginian by Owen Wister
- Vis and Rāmin by Fakhraddin Gorgani
- La Vita Nuova by Dante Alighieri
- The Vivisector by Patrick White
- A Vocation and a Voice by Kate Chopin
- Volpone and Other Plays (The Alchemist and Bartholomew Fair) by Ben Jonson
- Voss by Patrick White
- The Voyage of Argo by Apollonius of Rhodes
- The Voyage of the Beagle by Charles Darwin
- Voyages and Discoveries by Richard Hakluyt

=== W ===
- Walden by Henry David Thoreau
- War and Peace by Leo Tolstoy
- The War in the Air by H.G. Wells
- The War of the Worlds by H. G. Wells
- The War with Hannibal (Books XXI-XXX) by Titus Livy
- Ward No. 6 and Other Stories, 1892–1895 by Anton Chekhov
- The Warden by Anthony Trollope
- Washington Square by Henry James
- The Waste Land and Other Poems by T. S. Eliot
- The Water-Babies by Charles Kingsley
- Waverley by Walter Scott
- The Way of All Flesh by Samuel Butler
- The Way of the World and Other Plays by William Congreve
- The Way We Live Now by Anthony Trollope
- The Wayward Bus by John Steinbeck
- We by Yevgeny Zamyatin
- The Wealth of Nations by Adam Smith
- The Weaver's Songs by Kabir
- A Week on the Concord and Merrimack Rivers by Henry David Thoreau
- The Well-Beloved by Thomas Hardy
- What Is Art? by Leo Tolstoy
- What Maisie Knew by Henry James
- Where Angels Fear to Tread by E. M. Forster
- White Jacket by Herman Melville
- White Nights by Fyodor Dostoyevsky
- Who Would Have Thought It? by María Amparo Ruíz de Burton
- Why Read the Classics? by Italo Calvino
- Wieland and Memoirs of Carwin the Biloquist by Charles Brockden Brown
- The Wild Ass's Skin by Honoré de Balzac
- Winesburg, Ohio by Sherwood Anderson
- The Wings of the Dove by Henry James
- Winter in the Blood by James Welch
- The Winter of Our Discontent by John Steinbeck
- The Withered Arm and Other Stories by Thomas Hardy
- Wives and Daughters by Elizabeth Gaskell
- Wolf Willow by Wallace Stegner
- The Wolfman and Other Cases by Sigmund Freud
- The Woman in White by Wilkie Collins
- The Woman Who Rode Away and Other Stories by D. H. Lawrence
- Women in Love by D. H. Lawrence
- Women in Power
- Women's Early American Historical Narratives
- Women's Indian Captivity Narratives
- The Women's War by Alexandre Dumas
- Wonderful Adventures of Mrs. Seacole in Many Lands by Mary Seacole
- The Wonderful World of Oz (The Wizard of Oz, The Emerald City of Oz, Glinda of Oz) by L. Frank Baum
- The Woodlanders by Thomas Hardy
- Work: A Story of Experience by Louisa May Alcott
- World of Wonders by Robertson Davies
- The Worst Journey in the World by Apsley Cherry-Garrard
- Wuthering Heights by Emily Brontë

=== X – Y – Z ===
- A Year in Thoreau's Journal by Henry David Thoreau
- Young Lonigan by James T. Farrell
- Youth, The End of the Tether by Joseph Conrad
