= A Writer's Nightmare =

Collection of essays by R. K. Narayan

- First edition
- Author: R. K. Narayan
- Genre: Essays
- Publisher: Penguin Books
- Publication date: 1988
- Publication place: India
- Media type: Print
- ISBN: 978-0-14-010791-3
- OCLC: 20542881
- Dewey Decimal: 824 20
- LC Class: PR9499.3.N3 A6 1987
- Preceded by: Talkative Man
- Followed by: The World of Nagaraj

A Writer's Nightmare is a collection of essays by R. K. Narayan published in 1988 by Penguin Books. The essays included in the book are about topics as diverse as the caste system, love, Nobel Prize winners and monkeys; the book provides readers a unique view of Indian life. The essays were written at various points between 1958 and 1988; the book includes a significant essay, Misguided Guide, expressing Narayan's displeasure with the film Guide, based on his book The Guide.
