= S. T. Joshi =

American literary critic (born 1958)

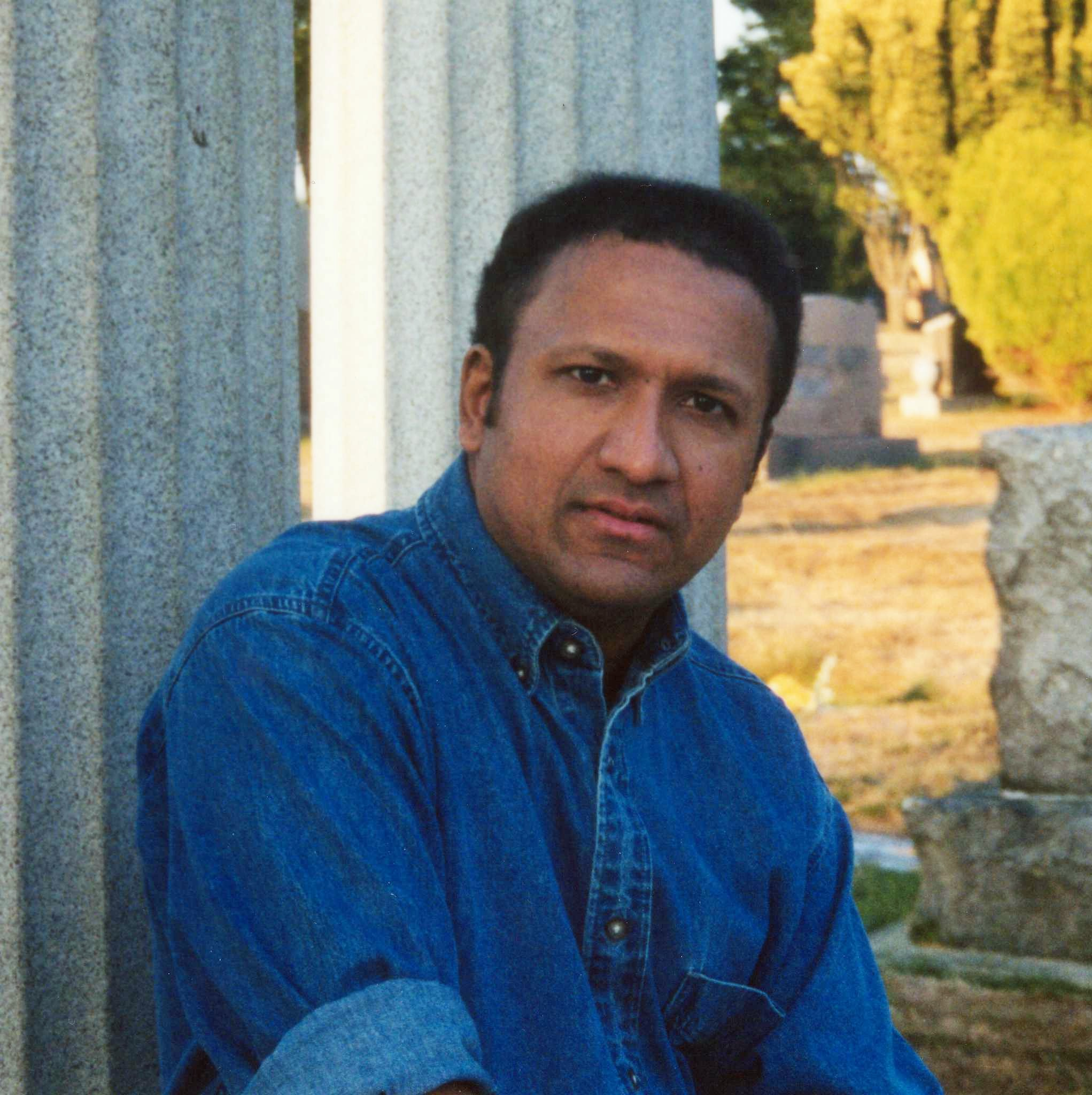
- Joshi in 2002
- Born: June 22, 1958 (age 68); Pune, India
- Citizenship: United States
- Education: Brown University (BA, MA)
- Occupation: Writer
- Writing career
- Subject: Weird fiction
- Website: stjoshi.org

Sunand Tryambak Joshi (born June 22, 1958) is an American literary critic whose work has largely focused on weird and fantastic fiction, especially the life and work of H. P. Lovecraft and associated writers.

== Career ==
His literary criticism focuses upon the worldviews of authors. His The Weird Tale examines horror and fantasy writing by Arthur Machen, Algernon Blackwood, Lord Dunsany, M. R. James, Ambrose Bierce, and Lovecraft.

== Personal life ==
S. T. Joshi was born on June 22, 1958, in Pune, India, to Marathi parents Tryambak M. Joshi and Padmini T. Joshi. When he was four, his family moved to the United States and settled in Indiana. He discovered the work of Lovecraft at age 13 in a public library in Muncie, Indiana. He also read L. Sprague de Camp's biography of Lovecraft, Lovecraft: A Biography, on publication in 1975, and began thereafter to devote himself to Lovecraft. This devotion led him to decline offers from Yale and Harvard so that he could attend Brown University, which is located in Providence, Rhode Island where Lovecraft had lived. He is an atheist.

He lives in Seattle, Washington. Joshi married Leslie Gary Boba on September 1, 2001. They divorced in December 2010.

In August 2014, Joshi opposed the decision to retire and replace Gahan Wilson's bust of Lovecraft as the World Fantasy Award statuette in light of a campaign highlighting Lovecraft's history of racism; Joshi returned his World Fantasy Awards in protest.

== Notable publications ==
=== Books ===
- Lord Dunsany: A Bibliography (1993) (co-writer: Darrell Schweitzer)
- H. P. Lovecraft: A Life (1996)
- Sixty Years of Arkham House: A History and Bibliography (Arkham House, 1999) ISBN 9780870541766
- I Am Providence: The Life and Times of H. P. Lovecraft (2010)
- Unutterable Horror: A History of Supernatural Fiction (2012)
- Lord Dunsany: A Comprehensive Bibliography (2013)

=== Edited volumes ===
- Miscellaneous Writings by H. P. Lovecraft (Arkham House, 1995).
- Documents of American Prejudice: An Anthology of Writings on Race from Thomas Jefferson to David Duke (Basic Books, 1999).
- The Call of Cthulhu and Other Weird Stories by H. P. Lovecraft (Penguin Classics No. 1, 1999).
- Atheism: A Reader (Prometheus Books, 2000).
- The Thing on the Doorstep and Other Weird Stories by H. P. Lovecraft (Penguin Classics No. 2, 2001).
- Searchers After Horror: New Tales of the Weird and Fantastic (Fedogan & Bremer, 2002).
- The Dreams in the Witch House and Other Weird Stories by H. P. Lovecraft (Penguin Classics No. 3, 2005).
- The Short Fiction of Ambrose Bierce - Comprehensive Edition in 3 Volumes, edited with Lawrence I. Berkove & David E. Schultz (2006).
- The Ghost in the Corner and Other Stories by Lord Dunsany, edited with Martin Andersson (Hippocampus Press, 2017).

== Awards ==
=== Literary awards ===
Year	Title	Award	Category	Result	Ref.
1990	The Weird Tale	Bram Stoker Award	Non-Fiction	Nominated	
1991	The Weird Tale	World Fantasy Award	Special Award – Professional	Nominated	
1991	John Dickson Carr: A Critical Study	Anthony Awards	Critical Work	Nominated	
1996	H. P. Lovecraft: A Life	Bram Stoker Award	Non-Fiction	Won	
1997	H. P. Lovecraft: A Life	British Fantasy Award	Small Press	Won	
1997	Lord Dunsany	Mythopoeic Awards	Myth and Fantasy Studies	Shortlisted	
1999	Sixty Years of Arkham House	International Horror Guild Award	Non-Fiction	Nominated	
2000	Sixty Years of Arkham House	Locus Award	Non-Fiction	Won	
2006	Supernatural Literature of the World	World Fantasy Award	Special Award – Professional	Nominated	
2006	Icons of Horror and the Supernatural	International Horror Guild Award	Non-Fiction	Won	
2007	American Supernatural Tales	International Horror Guild Award	Anthology	Nominated	
2007	Warnings to the Curious	International Horror Guild Award	Non-Fiction	Nominated	
2010	I Am Providence	Black Quill Award	Dark Genre Book of Non-Fiction	Nominated	
2011	Black Wings of Cthulhu	World Fantasy Award	Anthology	Nominated	
2012	Black Wings of Cthulhu 2	Shirley Jackson Award	Anthology	Nominated	
2013	Unutterable Horror Vol 1 and 2	World Fantasy Award	Special Award – Nonprofessional	Won	
2013	Unutterable Horror Vol 1 and 2	World Fantasy Award	Special Award – Nonprofessional	Won	
2014	Lovecraft and a World in Transition	Bram Stoker Award	Non-Fiction	Nominated	
2015	Black Wings of Cthulhu 4	Shirley Jackson Award	Anthology	Nominated	
2016	Black Wings of Cthulhu 4	World Fantasy Award	Anthology	Nominated	
2022	Ramsey Campbell: Master of Weird Fiction	Locus Recommended Reading	Non-Fiction	Won	

=== Honors ===
- International Association for the Fantastic in the Arts – IAFA Distinguished Critic Award
  2003
- World Fantasy Award – Special Award for Professional Scholarship
  2005
