= Mark Musa =

Mark Louis (Sonny) Musa (27 May 1934 – 31 December 2014) was a translator and scholar of Italian literature.

Musa was a graduate of Rutgers University (B.A., 1956), the University of Florence (as Fulbright Scholar of the U.S.-Italy Fulbright Commission 1956–1958), and Johns Hopkins University (M.A., 1959; Ph.D., 1961). He was a Guggenheim fellow and the author of articles and books, including Advent at the Gates: Dante's Comedy, published in 1974 by Indiana University Press. Best known for his translations of Italian classics, including Dante, Boccaccio, and Petrarch, he was Distinguished Professor Emeritus of German, French and Italian at Indiana University. Musa translated and edited The Portable Dante and (with Peter Bondanella) The Portable Machiavelli, both published by Penguin Books.

Musa died in Pollença, Mallorca, on 31 December 2014.
