= Tété-Michel Kpomassie =

Togolese explorer and writer

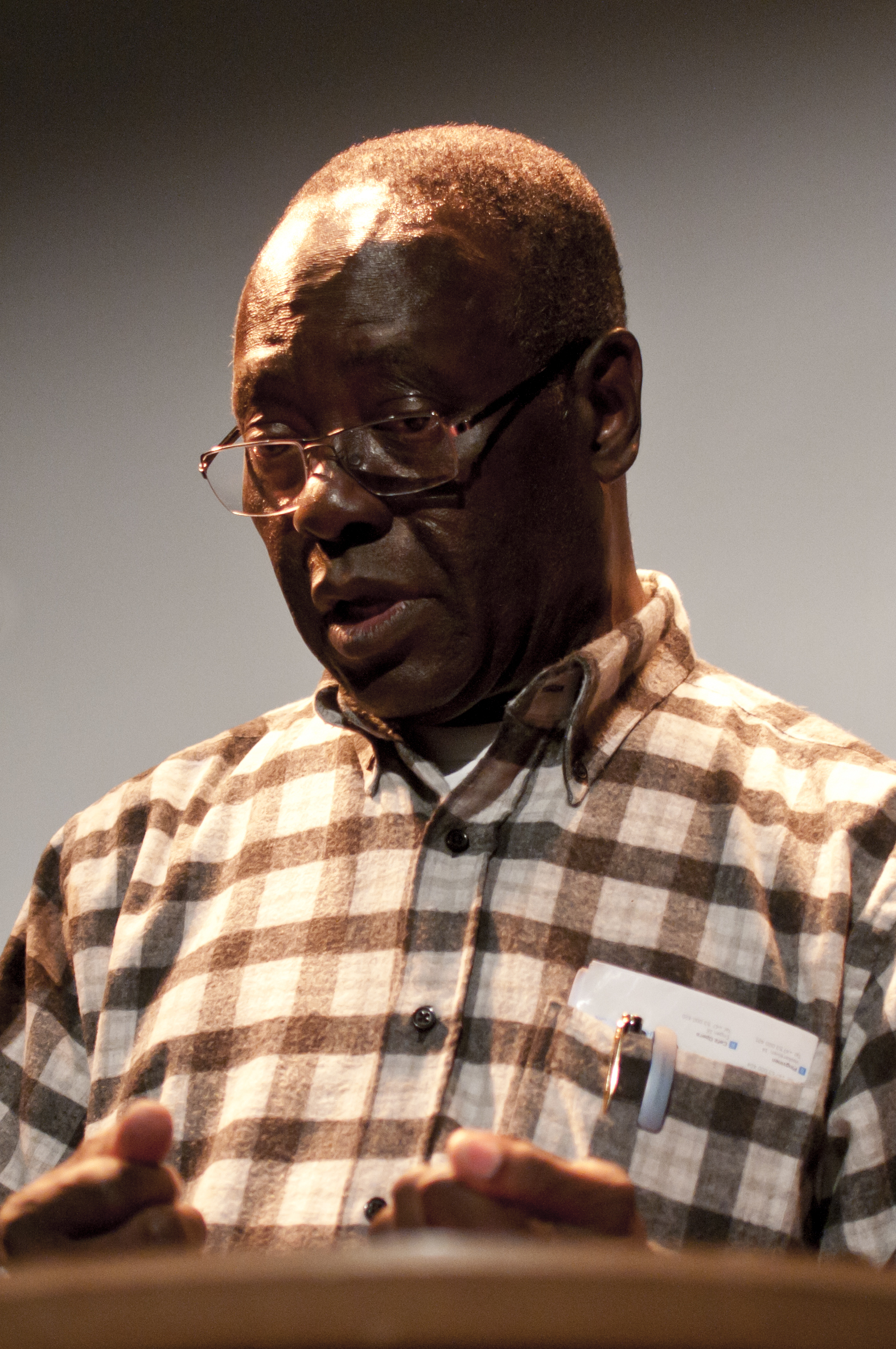
Tété-Michel Kpomassie speaks to The Bergen Student Society, October 18th, 2011

Tété-Michel Kpomassie is an explorer and writer from Togo, and the author of An African in Greenland.

== Biography ==
Kpomassie was born in 1941, in Togo, and received only six years of elementary education. His father, a prominent man in the village, had eight wives and 26 children. When he was a young man, he was collecting coconuts in a tree when he was surprised by a python, and fell to the ground. His father believed that his resulting illness could only be cured by consulting the priestess of the python cult, deep in the forest, and so he was taken, through one long night, into the heart of the snake-infested cult. The cure worked, but the priestess required a payment - Kpomassie would need to be initiated into the snake cult. This would require living for the next seven years in the jungle, among the snakes.

It was at this time, recovering from his illness and waiting to be taken back to the jungle, that Kpomassie found a children's book (The Eskimos from Greenland to Alaska by Dr. Robert Gessain) at the local Jesuit library about Greenland. Not only did this strange country have no snakes, but it had no trees in which they might hide. He fell immediately in love with the country and the idea of its native hunters. As soon as he was well, he ran away from home, with the sole idea of somehow reaching Greenland.

For the next twelve years he traveled, refusing to stay in one place more than six months, and worked his way through the countries of West Africa, into Europe, and finally, in the mid-1960s, found a boat to Greenland. All the while, he taught himself languages through correspondence courses and made an endless number of friends through his skills as a story-teller and natural charm. The story of his adventures in Greenland can be found in his book, published in France in 1977, An African in Greenland.

Kpomassie was awarded the Prix Littéraire Francophone International in 1981. In 2003, Leonard Lopate interviewed Kpomassie on WNYC for The Leonard Lopate Show.

In New York City, in September 2009, the Elizabeth Foundation for the Arts and Flux Factory organized an exhibition called Arctic Book Club centered on the book, with Kpomassie himself as the guest of honor.

Kpomassie currently lives in Nanterre, near Paris, France, but continues to regularly visit Greenland and his native country of Togo.

== Selected bibliography ==
- An African in Greenland, originally published in French in 1977, English translation by James Kirkup published in 1981
