= The Dreams in the Witch House and Other Weird Stories =

- Author: H. P. Lovecraft
- Language: English
- Series: Penguin Classics
- Genre: Science fiction, fantasy, horror
- Publisher: Penguin Books
- Publication date: September 8, 2004
- Publication place: United States
- Media type: Print (paperback)
- Pages: 480 pp
- ISBN: 978-0142437957
- Preceded by: The Thing on the Doorstep and Other Weird Stories

The Dreams in the Witch House and Other Weird Stories is Penguin Classics' third omnibus edition of works by 20th-century American author H. P. Lovecraft. It was released in September 2004 and is still in print.

This edition is the third in Penguin Classics' series of paperback collections. It collects the "definitive" editions of Lovecraft's popular stories as edited by S. T. Joshi.

Its companion volumes from Penguin Classics are The Call of Cthulhu and Other Weird Stories (2001), and The Thing on the Doorstep and Other Weird Stories (2001).

== Contents ==
The Dreams in the Witch House and Other Weird Stories contains the following tales:

1. Polaris
2. The Doom that Came to Sarnath
3. The Terrible Old Man
4. The Tree
5. The Cats of Ulthar
6. From Beyond
7. The Nameless City
8. The Moon-Bog
9. The Other Gods
10. Hypnos
11. The Lurking Fear
12. The Unnamable
13. The Shunned House
14. The Horror at Red Hook
15. In the Vault
16. The Strange High House in the Mist
17. The Dream-Quest of Unknown Kadath
18. The Silver Key
19. Through the Gates of the Silver Key
20. The Dreams in the Witch House
21. The Shadow Out of Time
