= The Call of Cthulhu and Other Weird Stories =

Anthology

- Author: H. P. Lovecraft
- Language: English
- Series: Penguin Classics
- Genre: Science fiction, fantasy, horror
- Publisher: Penguin Books
- Publication date: October 1, 1999
- Publication place: United States
- Media type: Print (paperback)
- Pages: 420 pp
- ISBN: 0-14-118234-2
- OCLC: 40723781
- Dewey Decimal: 813/.52 21
- LC Class: PS3523.O833 A6 1999
- Followed by: The Thing on the Doorstep and Other Weird Stories

The Call of Cthulhu and Other Weird Stories is Penguin Classics' first omnibus edition of works by seminal 20th-century American author H. P. Lovecraft. It was released in October 1999 and is still in print. The volume is named for the Lovecraft short story, "The Call of Cthulhu".

This edition, the first new paperback publication of Lovecraft's works since the Del-Rey editions, contains a new introduction and explanatory notes on individual stories by noted Lovecraft scholar S. T. Joshi. The texts of the stories are, for the most part, the same corrected versions found in the earlier Arkham House editions of Lovecraft's works, also edited by Joshi, with a few further errors corrected for the present editions.

Its companion volumes from Penguin Classics are The Thing on the Doorstep and Other Weird Stories (2001), and The Dreams in the Witch House and Other Weird Stories (2004).

== Contents ==
The Call of Cthulhu and Other Weird Stories contains the following tales:

1. Dagon
2. The Statement of Randolph Carter
3. Facts Concerning the Late Arthur Jermyn and His Family
4. Celephaïs
5. Nyarlathotep
6. The Picture in the House
7. The Outsider
8. Herbert West -- Reanimator
9. The Hound
10. The Rats in the Walls
11. The Festival
12. He
13. Cool Air
14. The Call of Cthulhu
15. The Colour Out of Space
16. The Whisperer in Darkness
17. The Shadow Over Innsmouth
18. The Haunter of the Dark
