= An African in Greenland =

1981 memoir by Tété-Michel Kpomassie

- First US edition
- Author: Tété-Michel Kpomassie
- Translator: James Kirkup
- Language: English (translation from French)
- Genre: Memoir
- Publisher: Harcourt Brace Jovanovich (US); Secker & Warburg (UK)
- Publication date: 1983
- Publication place: United States
- Pages: 298 pp.
- ISBN: 0151055890
- OCLC: 8954712

An African in Greenland is a 1981 book by the Togolese author Tété-Michel Kpomassie.

== Overview ==
The book details Kpomassie's upbringing in Togo, his encounter as a teen with a book about Greenland and his determination to move there and become a hunter. As A. Alvarez, in his introduction, writes: "Kpomassie's book is the ultimate exotic mix—an adventure story that begins in Togo, a narrow strip of a country, formerly a French colony, sandwiched between Benin and Ghana, and ends in Upernavik, way north of the Arctic Circle, on the west coast of Greenland." After eight years, working his way across Africa and Europe, he finally arrives on the Arctic island. The book recounts all the many episodes one expects from adventure literature: trouble at home, imagining a better life elsewhere, the struggle to find that life, disillusionment with certain hard facts that rub against bookish fancies, and the return, a state of mind where the author is more mature and more in touch with reality. Again, as Alvarez points out, the story reads like a fairy tale.

Readers discover the meaning of the Togolese bokonon, priest of the sacred python, uncharacteristic forms of French hospitality, German housekeeping, Danish dishwashing, and, most of all, the unusual sense of freedom and casualness of the Inuit. His encounter with the native Kalaallit population, which is very different but in many ways very similar in its lifestyle to the tribal society of Togo, forms the core of this book.

Kpomassie did an interview for the BBC, in which he describes his encounters.

== Adaptation ==
The book was adapted by Rex Obano for BBC Radio 4 in 2023, with Danny Sapani as Kpomassie.
