= The Thing on the Doorstep and Other Weird Stories =

Book by Howard Phillips Lovecraft

- Author: H. P. Lovecraft
- Language: English
- Series: Penguin Classics
- Genre: Science fiction, fantasy, horror
- Publisher: Penguin Books
- Publication date: October 2, 2001
- Publication place: United States
- Media type: Print (paperback)
- Pages: 464 pp
- ISBN: 0-14-218003-3
- OCLC: 47225267
- Dewey Decimal: 813/.52 21
- LC Class: PS3523.O833 A6 2001
- Preceded by: The Call of Cthulhu and Other Weird Stories
- Followed by: The Dreams in the Witch House and Other Weird Stories

The Thing on the Doorstep and Other Weird Stories is Penguin Classics' second omnibus edition of works by 20th-century American author H. P. Lovecraft. It was released in October 2001 and is still in print.

This edition is the second in Penguin Classics' series of paperback collections. Again, it collects a number of Lovecraft's most popular stories in their latest "definitive" editions as edited by S. T. Joshi. Many of the texts are the same as those from the earlier Arkham House hardcover editions, with the exception of At the Mountains of Madness, which has recently been released in a definitive edition by the Modern Library, with an introduction by China Miéville and also including Lovecraft's essay on the history and evolution of weird fiction, Supernatural Horror in Literature.

Its companion volumes from Penguin Classics are The Call of Cthulhu and Other Weird Stories (2001), and The Dreams in the Witch House and Other Weird Stories (2004).

== Contents ==
The Thing on the Doorstep and Other Weird Stories contains the following tales:

1. The Tomb
2. Beyond the Wall of Sleep
3. The White Ship
4. The Temple
5. The Quest of Iranon
6. The Music of Erich Zann
7. Imprisoned with the Pharaohs aka Under the Pyramids
8. Pickman's Model
9. The Case of Charles Dexter Ward
10. The Dunwich Horror
11. At the Mountains of Madness
12. The Thing on the Doorstep
