= Nobody Knows My Name =

1961 essay collection by James Baldwin

Nobody Knows My Name: More Notes of a Native Son
- First edition cover
- Author: James Baldwin
- Language: English
- Genre: Essays
- Publisher: Dial Press
- Publication date: 1961
- Publication place: United States
- ISBN: 0-679-74473-8

Nobody Knows My Name: More Notes of A Native Son is a collection of essays by author James Baldwin that was published in 1961 by Dial Press. The book contains 13 essays written by Baldwin from 1954 to 1961 and serves as a companion to his first collection Notes of A Native Son (published in 1955). The book is an examination by Baldwin on being an African-American author throughout the late 1950s and early 1960s. The topics covered in the essays vary from literary criticism, desegregation, homosexuality, life in U.S South, police brutality and French intellectual life.

== Essays ==
Essay title	Original appearance	Original title/adaption
"The Discovery of What It Means to Be an American"	The New York Times Book Review, 25 January 1959	
"Princes and Powers"	Encounter, January 1957	
"Fifth Avenue, Uptown: A Letter from Harlem"	Esquire, July 1960	
"East River, Downtown: Postscript to a Letter from Harlem"	The New York Times Magazine, March 12, 1961	"A Negro Assays the Negro Mood"
"A Fly in Buttermilk"	Harper's, October 1958	"The Hard Kind of Courage"
"Nobody Knows My Name: A Letter from the South"	Partisan Review, Winter 1959	
"Faulkner and Desegregation"	Partisan Review, Fall 1956	
"In Search of a Majority"	Adapted from an address delivered at Kalamazoo College, February 1960	
"The Male Prison"	The New Leader, December 13, 1954	"Gide as Husband and Homosexual"
"Notes for a Hypothetical Novel"	Adapted from an address delivered at an Esquire magazine symposium on "Writing in America Today", San Francisco State College, 22–24 October 1960	
"The Northern Protestant"	Esquire, April 1960	"The Precarious Vogue of Ingmar Bergman"
"Alas, Poor Richard"	Section 1: Reporter, 16 March 1961	"The Survival of Richard Wright"
"Alas, Poor Richard"	Section 2: Encounter, April 1961	"Richard Wright"
"Alas, Poor Richard"	Section 3: Nobody Knows My Name	
"The Black Boy Looks at the White Boy"	Esquire, May 1961	

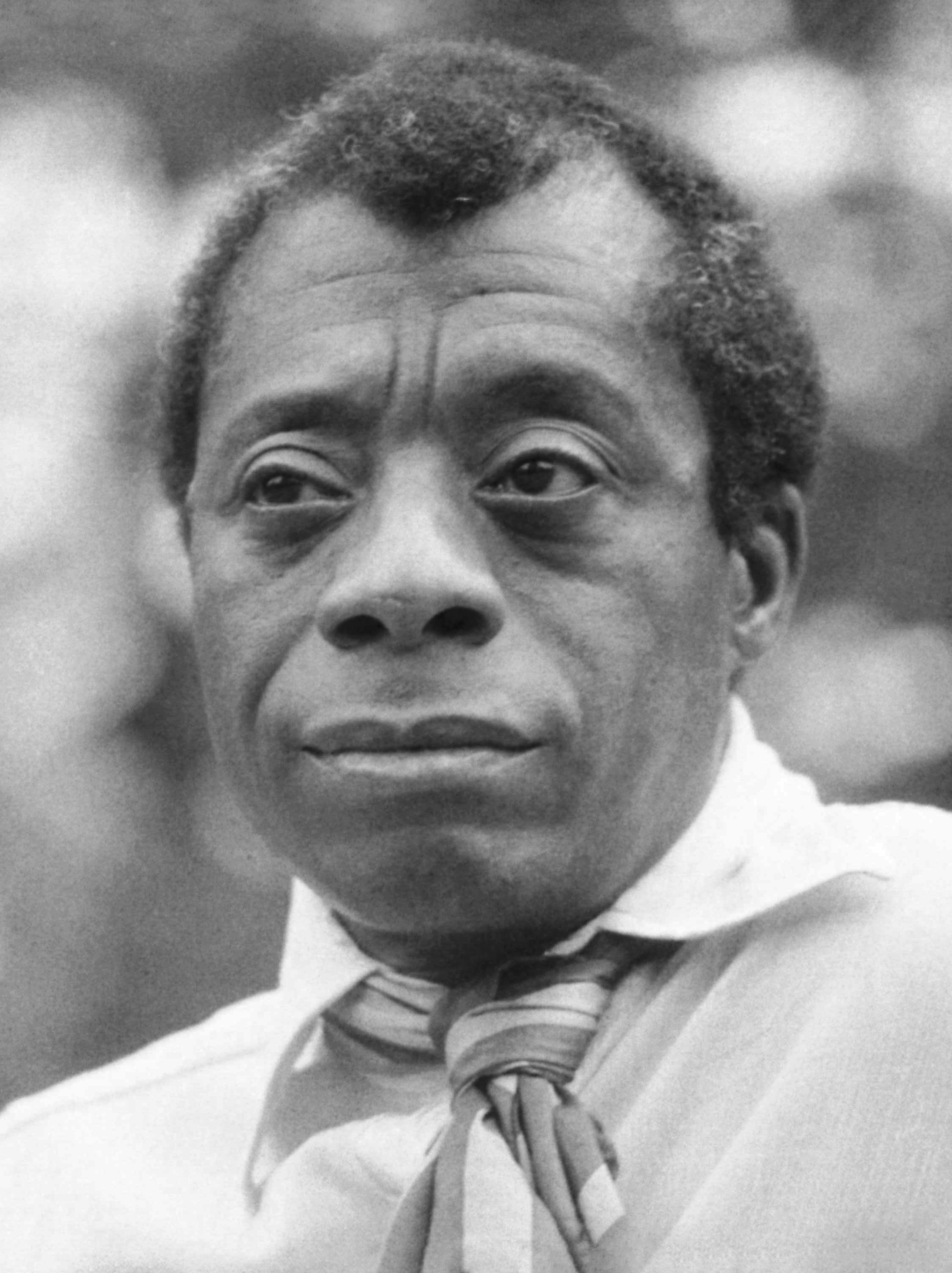
James Baldwin

=== 1. "The Discovery of What It Means To Be an American" ===
"The Discovery of What It Means To Be an American" was an essay published in The New York Times Book Review on January 25, 1959. In it, Baldwin expands on his time in Europe and reflects on how his self-exile led to personal discoveries on his national identity. Baldwin opens the essay by discussing the reasoning behind his decision to leave the United States in favor of Europe. He states his quest to find an identity for himself outside of the segregated and white dominated society of the U.S at the time. Baldwin's exploration of what it means to be an American is rooted in his acute awareness of racial injustice, historical oppression, and the complexities of national identity for black Americans. By writing on his experiences in Paris, Baldwin was able to rid himself of the label "negro". Instead, adopting a more emancipated identity as an American while abroad. Baldwin points to this personal revelation having emerged from the experience of alienation shared by all Americans abroad.

Baldwin argues that while exile allows American writers intellectual freedom, no country in the world is entirely free and pure.

=== 2. "Princes and Power" ===
Published in Encounter in 1957, "Princes and Power" is an essay on Baldwin's experiences at the 1956 Conference of Negro African Writers and Artists (Le Congrès des écrivains et artistes noirs). Baldwin writes on various different figures who attended the conference and engages with the ideas they presented.

=== 3. "Fifth Avenue Uptown: A Letter from Harlem" ===
Published in Esquire magazine in 1960, "Fifth Avenue Uptown: A Letter from Harlem" is a contemplation of ghettos and their role within American society. Within the essay, Baldwin argues that the existence of ghettos is a representation of the lack of empathy present within America. The essay begins with Baldwin introducing readers to his childhood home of Fifth Avenue, which has seen drastic changes due to the construction of a new housing project. While Baldwin mentions the physical changes, the essay primarily focuses on the changes within the community. Baldwin describes the presence of "human gaps" that have resulted from a series of deaths. These deaths that Baldwin describes are both literal and figurative. The literal deaths Baldwin attributes to those killed by World War Two, the Korean War, police brutality, gang warfare and drugs. The figurative deaths come from individuals who have sought to forget themselves and the misery that surrounds them through forms of escapism.

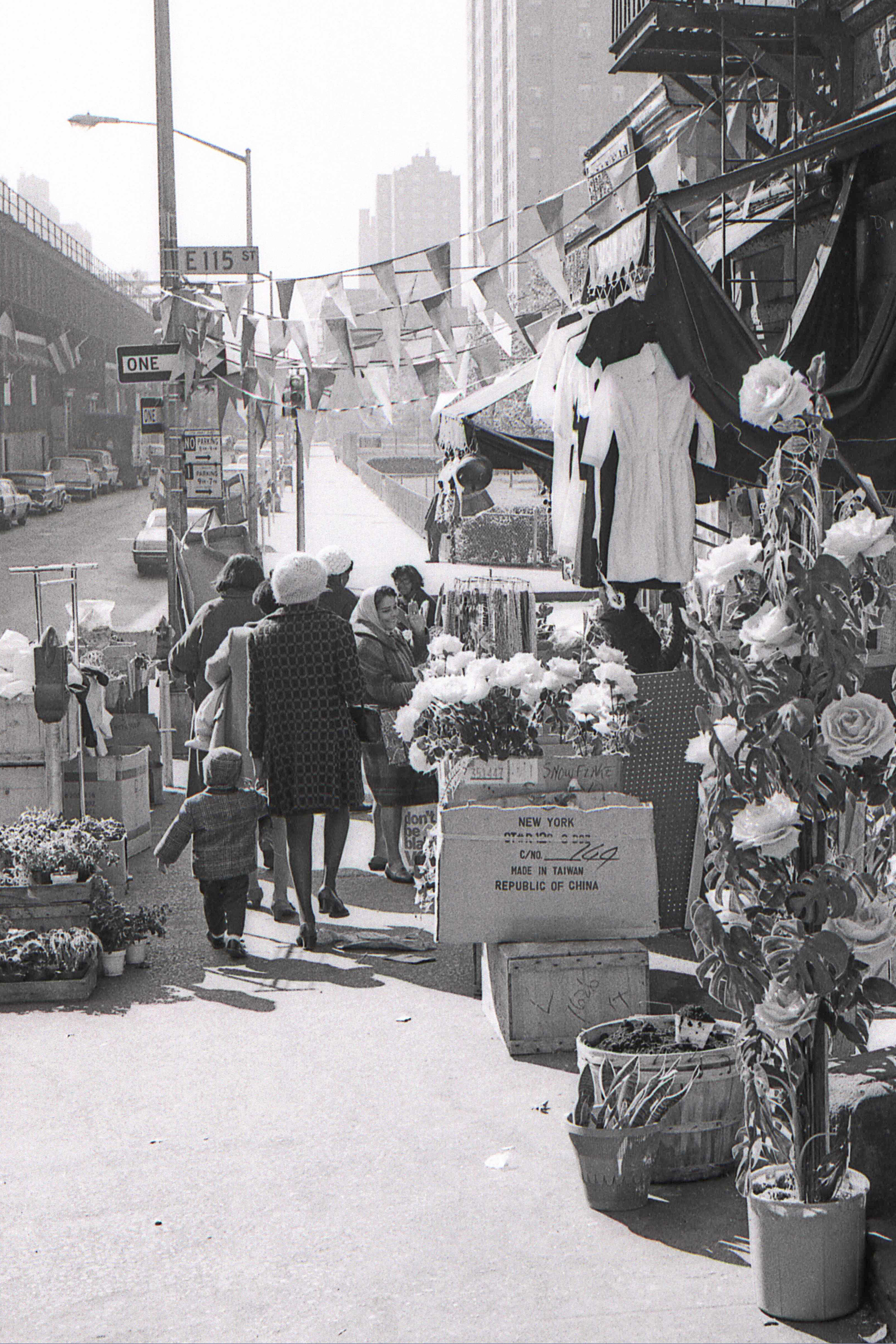
Sidewalk in East Harlem, New York, 1969

The result, Baldwin argues, is a social alienation that is only reinforced by a White American society that is intent on forgetting these communities all together. This alienation is enforced by a police state whose officers were sent to these ghettos to control and oppress those living there. Baldwin goes into great depth about the police presence and the violent outbreaks that emerged as a result. Baldwin goes on to analyze the failings of the North to claim its crimes committed against the Black community. The primary crime being that of ignorance. The white liberal agenda ignores the racial issues prevalent in the North simply because it is worse in the Southern United States. Baldwin points to a sense of righteousness that emerged in the North from having fought on the right side of the Civil War. Ultimately, Baldwin concludes that America’s racial problems will only be solved once the problem of the ghettos is addressed by American society both by North and South.

=== 4. "East River Downtown: Postscript to a Letter from Harlem" ===
Published in The New York Times Magazine on March 12, 1961, "East River Downtown: Postscript to a Letter from Harlem" is a companion piece to "Fifth Avenue Uptown: A Letter from Harlem" . The essay begins with Baldwin addressing the global unrest following the assassination of Patrice Lumumba. Baldwin points to these mounting pressures, particularly the Cold War, as giving Americans the means to avoid self-examination. That a protest by African Americans at the U.N. Council was the work of "communists" rather than the call of an oppressed population. Baldwin argues that the rioting serves as a representation of the anger that has been brewing in Harlem and every other American ghetto. American ignorance towards this anger Baldwin discusses, suggests that the Southern attitude towards the “negro” is essentially the national attitude as well. One that thinks that the black population is roused only by foreign powers and not domestic discontent.

To counteract such beliefs, Baldwin examines two domestic social movements that he classifies as the "most powerful": the black student movement and the muslim movement that were gaining momentum in the early sixties. The former centers its work on liberating everyone with the understanding that white people need to see black people for who they are for any change to come about. A recurring theme that Baldwin emphasizes in this essay and all his other works. Baldwin asserts that the muslim movement, in contrast, challenges the sincerity of American sentiments and calls for the separation of races. Baldwin agrees with the approaches of both movements and points to white people's inaction in implementing any change within the country. He also speaks to black Americans and stresses the importance of allegiance from a government to its people. Baldwin ends the essay by reaffirming that if the U.S. cannot face and eliminate sources of discontent within the country, it has no hope of doing so on the global stage.

=== 5. "A Fly in Buttermilk" ===
Originally published under the title "The Hard Kind of Courage" in Harper's Magazine in October 1958, "A Fly in Buttermilk" was republished under its new title in "Nobody Knows My Name: More Notes from a Native Son". The essay emerged out of Baldwin's first trip to the American South in 1957. It focuses largely on Baldwin's interview with a black family and their son Gus on his first days at an all-white high school. Baldwin's focus on the children largely emerges from their ability to live in the present under the overwhelming weight of the past. Baldwin is particularly struck by the silence from the family, which forces him to rely upon what is being communicated outside of speech. Baldwin questions why the family continues to persevere despite the violence that has been directed towards them. A violence that Baldwin notes pushes Gus into a daily isolation at the hands of his peers. The mother responds to Baldwin's question by emphasizing the need for her son to have a good education.

=== 6. "Nobody Knows My Name: A Letter From the South" ===
Published in the Partisan Review in 1959, "Nobody Knows My Name: A Letter from the South" is Baldwin's reflection on his journey through the American South. Within the essay, Baldwin explores the collective American identity and connects it to the importance of self-examination. As he juxtaposes the North and the South, Baldwin explains that most Americans feel connected to a false image of American identity. Like in many of his other essays, Baldwin notes that confronting the reality of the American identity is an uncomfortable experience. He demands that the reader confront the reality of racial violence and the systems of inequity upon which the United States is founded. Baldwin accomplishes this by recounting the atrocities committed by white individuals, particularly citing the murder of Emmett Till and Willie McGhee. Baldwin also follows the status of desegregation of Southern schools by recounting the experiences of Dorothy Counts, one of three students attending an all-white high school in Charlotte, North Carolina. Baldwin goes on to discuss the status of black schools and how they were designed to perpetuate the system of segregation.

As the essay continues, Baldwin compares the experiences of different Southern cities. He notes Atlanta as part of the true South, one that he describes as demanding violence. During his time in Atlanta, Baldwin reflects on his own experiences, describing how black individuals in the South have experienced a hell that he will never experience. Wealthier Black individuals, Baldwin argues, while better off are still in a sinister position, used as pawns by the administration of the city of Atlanta to give an illusion of interracial communication and compelled to work for the systems that facilitate the destruction of their lives.

=== 7. "Faulkner and Desegregation" ===
Published in the Partisan Review in the Fall of 1956, "Faulkner and Desegregation" was a response to William Faulkner's "A Letter to a Northern Editor", in which Faulkner advises the NAACP to slow their efforts for desegregation.

== Critical reception ==
In The New York Times, critic Irving Howe called Nobody Knows My Name a "brilliant new collection of essays", concluding: "To take a cue from his title, we had better learn his name."
