= Talkative Man =

1986 novel by R.K. Narayan

- First edition (India)
- Author: R.K. Narayan
- Publisher: Indian Thought Publications; Heinemann (UK
- Publication date: 1986
- Publication place: India
- Media type: Print
- ISBN: 978-0-670-81341-4
- OCLC: 14166421
- Dewey Decimal: 823 19
- LC Class: PR9499.3.N3 T3 1987
- Preceded by: Under the Banyan Tree and Other Stories
- Followed by: A Writer's Nightmare

Talkative Man is a novel by R. K. Narayan first published in 1986 by Heinemann. Like his earlier novels, this one is also set in the fictional town of Malgudi. The novel is a bit short by Narayan's standards but provides the same level of enjoyment one experiences with his other writings.

== Plot ==
The main character is an ordinary man who is wealthy and works as a journalist. He has a regular routine in his life: posting articles in the post box, having a talk with people at the tea shop, going to the library and the house. One day, he meets a man from an unknown land called "Timbuctoo", another of Narayan's creations, the land being similar to the US. The man seems to have come for an official duty for the UN and seeing the calmness of the place, decides to stay there for his work.
